= 2010 Tri Nations Series =

- Date: 10 July 2010– 11 September 2010

Final positions
- Champions: New Zealand (10th title)
- Bledisloe Cup: New Zealand
- Freedom Cup: New Zealand
- Mandela Challenge Plate: Australia

Tournament statistics
- Matches played: 9
- Tries scored: 52 (5.78 per match)
- Attendance: 441,997 (49,111 per match)
- Top scorer(s): (South Africa) Morné Steyn (77)
- Most tries: (Australia) James O'Connor (New Zealand) Mils Muliaina (4 tries)

The 2010 Tri Nations Series was the 15th annual Tri Nations series between the national rugby union teams of New Zealand, Australia and South Africa.

New Zealand clinched the series crown with one match remaining, scoring two tries in the last 3 minutes to defeat South Africa 29–22 on 21 August in the first-ever Test at FNB Stadium in Johannesburg. The 2010 Tri-Nations season has seen new records set by the All Blacks; they are the first team to finish undefeated since the expansion of the tournament to 9 rounds, and have seen the highest number of tries and overall points in the history of the tournament.

The series concluded 11 September 2010 with New Zealand's win over Australia 23–22. The 2011 series commenced on 23 July 2011 in Australia.

== Background ==
New Zealand, South Africa and Australia were ranked first, second, and third in the IRB World Rankings, but this changed due to Australia's 21–20 loss to England on 16 June 2010. This game moved Australia down to fourth in the IRB World Rankings but they returned to third in rankings a week later, after France's heavy defeat to Argentina and Australia's win against Ireland in the last week of the 2010 mid-year rugby test series.

The final match of the Bledisloe Cup series between Australia and New Zealand took place after the Tri-Nations, on 30 October (the first 3 matches of the series were part of the Tri-Nations).

== Standings ==
Place	Nation	Games				Points			Bonus points		Table points
Place	Nation	Played	Won	Drawn	Lost	For	Against	Diff	4 Tries	7 Point Loss	Table points
1	New Zealand	6	6	0	0	184	111	+73	3	0	27
2	Australia	6	2	0	4	162	188	−26	2	1	11
3	South Africa	6	1	0	5	147	194	−47	1	2	7

== Fixtures ==
All times are local

=== Round 1 ===
10 July 2010
19:35 NZST (UTC+12)

(1 BP) New Zealand	32–12	South Africa
Try: Smith 18' c Nonu 35' c Read 56' c Woodcock 79' m Con: Carter (3/4); Pen: Carter (2/3) 13', 24'	Report	Pen: Steyn (4/4) 6', 41', 46', 60'

Eden Park, Auckland
Attendance: 25,000
Referee: Alan Lewis (Ireland)

FB	15	Mils Muliaina
RW	14	Cory Jane
OC	13	Conrad Smith
IC	12	Ma'a Nonu
LW	11	Joe Rokocoko	(substituted off) 58'
FH	10	Dan Carter
SH	9	Jimmy Cowan	(substituted off) 54'
N8	8	Kieran Read
OF	7	Richie McCaw (c)
BF	6	Jerome Kaino	(substituted off) 72'
RL	5	Tom Donnelly	(substituted off) 72'
LL	4	Brad Thorn
TP	3	Carl Hayman	(substituted off) 64'
HK	2	Keven Mealamu	(substituted off) 78'
LP	1	Tony Woodcock
Substitutes:
HK	16	Corey Flynn	(substituted on) 78'
PR	17	Ben Franks	(substituted on) 64'
LK	18	Sam Whitelock	(substituted on) 72'
FL	19	Liam Messam	(substituted on) 72'
SH	20	Piri Weepu	(substituted on) 54'
FH	21	Aaron Cruden
WG	22	Richard Kahui	(substituted on) 58'
Coach:
(New Zealand) Graham Henry

FB	15	Zane Kirchner
RW	14	Jean de Villiers
OC	13	Jaque Fourie
IC	12	Wynand Olivier		(substituted off) 72'
LW	11	Bryan Habana
FH	10	Morné Steyn		(substituted off) 72'
SH	9	Ricky Januarie		(substituted off) 76'
N8	8	Pierre Spies
OF	7	Francois Louw		(substituted off) 52'
BF	6	Schalk Burger
RL	5	Victor Matfield
LL	4	Bakkies Botha	(yellow card) 13' to 23'	(substituted off) 52'
TP	3	Jannie du Plessis		(substituted off) 59'
HK	2	John Smit (c)		(substituted off) 72'
LP	1	Gurthrö Steenkamp
Substitutes:
HK	16	Chiliboy Ralepelle		(substituted on) 72'
PR	17	BJ Botha		(substituted on) 59'
LK	18	Andries Bekker		(substituted on) 52'
LK	19	Danie Rossouw		(substituted on) 52'
SH	20	Ruan Pienaar		(substituted on) 76'
FH	21	Butch James		(substituted on) 72'
WG	22	Gio Aplon		(substituted on) 72'
Coach:
(South Africa) Peter de Villiers

Touch judges:
Alain Rolland (Ireland)
Stuart Dickinson (Australia)
Television match official:
Ben Skeen (New Zealand)

- Following the match, Bakkies Botha was handed a nine-week suspension for headbutting Jimmy Cowan in the first minute of the match, an offence missed by referee Alan Lewis. The suspension sidelined Botha for the remainder of the Tri Nations.

=== Round 2 ===
17 July 2010
19:35 NZST (UTC+12)

(1 BP) New Zealand	31–17	South Africa
Try: Nonu 7' m Muliaina 11' m Ranger 45' m Dagg 65' c Con: Carter (1/4); Pen: Carter (2/4) 30', 69'; Weepu (1/1) 51'	Report	Try: Rossouw 36' c Burger 74' c Con: Steyn (2/2); Pen: Steyn (1/1) 42'

Westpac Stadium, Wellington
Attendance: 36,000
Referee: Alain Rolland (Ireland)

FB	15	Mils Muliaina
RW	14	Cory Jane
OC	13	Conrad Smith
IC	12	Ma'a Nonu	(substituted off) 73'
LW	11	Rene Ranger	(substituted off) 63'
FH	10	Dan Carter
SH	9	Piri Weepu	(substituted off) 63'
N8	8	Kieran Read
OF	7	Richie McCaw (c)	(substituted off) 76'
BF	6	Jerome Kaino
RL	5	Tom Donnelly	(substituted off) 63'
LL	4	Brad Thorn
TP	3	Carl Hayman	(substituted off) 70'
HK	2	Keven Mealamu	(substituted off) 76'
LP	1	Tony Woodcock
Substitutes:
HK	16	Corey Flynn	(substituted on) 76'
PR	17	Ben Franks	(substituted on) 70'
LK	18	Sam Whitelock	(substituted on) 63'
FL	19	Liam Messam	(substituted on) 76'
SH	20	Jimmy Cowan	(substituted on) 63'
FH	21	Aaron Cruden	(substituted on) 73'
FB	22	Israel Dagg	(substituted on) 63'
Coach:
(New Zealand) Graham Henry

FB	15	Zane Kirchner
RW	14	Jean de Villiers		(substituted off) 40'
OC	13	Jaque Fourie
IC	12	Wynand Olivier
LW	11	Bryan Habana
FH	10	Morné Steyn
SH	9	Ricky Januarie		(substituted off) 53'
N8	8	Pierre Spies		(substituted off) 70'
OF	7	Francois Louw
BF	6	Schalk Burger
RL	5	Victor Matfield
LL	4	Danie Rossouw	(yellow card) 4' to 14'	(substituted off) 53'
TP	3	CJ van der Linde		(substituted off) 40'
HK	2	John Smit (c)		(substituted off) 76'
LP	1	Gurthrö Steenkamp
Substitutes:
HK	16	Chiliboy Ralepelle		(substituted on) 76'
PR	17	BJ Botha		(substituted on) 40'
LK	18	Andries Bekker		(substituted on) 53'
N8	19	Ryan Kankowski		(substituted on) 70'
SH	20	Ruan Pienaar		(substituted on) 53'
FH	21	Butch James
WG	22	Gio Aplon		(substituted on) 40'
Coach:
(South Africa) Peter de Villiers

Touch judges:
Alan Lewis (Ireland)
Stuart Dickinson (Australia)
Television match official:
Glenn Newman (New Zealand)

- During this match the All Blacks became the highest point scorers in international rugby, passing France.
- Following the match, Jean de Villiers was handed a two-week suspension for a lifting tackle against Rene Ranger. De Villiers' previously good disciplinary record was cited as a mitigating factor with regard to the length of suspension. The suspension sidelined de Villiers for the Springboks' next match against Australia.

=== Round 3 ===
24 July 2010
20:00 AEST (UTC+10)

Australia	30–13	South Africa
Try: Mitchell 39' m Genia 75' c Con: O'Connor (1/1); Pen: Giteau (5/6) 14', 19', 23', 31', 42'; O'Connor (1/1) 46'	Report	Try: Fourie 62' m Steenlamp 71' m Pen: Steyn (1/1) 17'

Suncorp Stadium, Brisbane
Attendance: 44,284
Referee: George Clancy (Ireland)

FB	15	Adam Ashley-Cooper
RW	14	James O'Connor
OC	13	Rob Horne
IC	12	Matt Giteau		(substituted off) 74'
LW	11	Drew Mitchell
FH	10	Quade Cooper	(yellow card) 54' to 64'
SH	9	Will Genia
N8	8	Richard Brown		(substituted off) 70'
OF	7	David Pocock
BF	6	Rocky Elsom (c)
RL	5	Nathan Sharpe
LL	4	Dean Mumm		(substituted off) 68'
TP	3	Salesi Ma'afu
HK	2	Saia Fainga'a		(substituted off) 54'
LP	1	Benn Robinson		(substituted off) 58'
Replacements:
HK	16	Stephen Moore		(substituted on) 54'
PR	17	James Slipper		(substituted on) 58'
LK	18	Rob Simmons		(substituted on) 68'
N8	19	Ben McCalman		(substituted on) 70'
SH	20	Luke Burgess
FH	21	Berrick Barnes		(substituted on) 74'
FB	22	Kurtley Beale
Coach:
(New Zealand) Robbie Deans

FB	15	Zane Kirchner
RW	14	Gio Aplon
OC	13	Jaque Fourie	(yellow card) 2' to 12'
IC	12	Wynand Olivier		(substituted off) 54'
LW	11	Bryan Habana
FH	10	Morné Steyn		(substituted off) 54'
SH	9	Ruan Pienaar		(substituted off) 72'
N8	8	Pierre Spies		48' to 55'
BF	7	Ryan Kankowski		(substituted off) 56'
OF	6	Schalk Burger
RL	5	Victor Matfield
LL	4	Danie Rossouw		(substituted off) 68'
TP	3	BJ Botha	(yellow card) 45' to 55'	(substituted off) 68'
HK	2	John Smit (c)		(substituted off) 72'
LP	1	Gurthro Steenkamp
Replacements:
HK	16	Chiliboy Ralepelle		(substituted on) 72'
PR	17	CJ van der Linde		(substituted on) 48'	(substituted off) 55'	(substituted on) 68'
LK	18	Flip van der Merwe		(substituted on) 68'
N8	19	Dewald Potgieter		(substituted on) 56'
SH	20	Francois Hougaard		(substituted on) 72'
FH	21	Butch James		(substituted on) 54'
FB	22	Juan de Jongh		(substituted on) 54'
Coach:
(South Africa) Peter de Villiers

Touch judges:
Keith Brown (New Zealand)
Vinny Munro (New Zealand)
Television match official:
Matt Goddard (Australia)

- Following the match, two players, one from each team, were handed suspensions:
  - Jaque Fourie was suspended for four weeks for a spear tackle of Richard Brown. He will miss the Springboks' next Test against the All Blacks.
  - Quade Cooper was suspended for two weeks for a spear tackle of Morné Steyn. As in the case of Jean de Villiers last week, Cooper's previously good disciplinary history was cited as a mitigating factor. The Australian Rugby Union appealed the length of the ban, presumably because the suspensions of Fourie and de Villiers kept them out of only one Test, but was denied. Cooper was sidelined for the first two Bledisloe Cup Tests in Melbourne and Christchurch.

=== Round 4 ===
31 July 2010
20:00 AEST (UTC+10)

Australia	28–49	New Zealand (1 BP)
Try: Mitchell 7' m Ashley-Cooper 55' c Elsom 69' c Con: Giteau (2/3); Pen: Giteau 3', 30'; Barnes 17'	Report	Try: Carter 9' c Muliaina 12' m, 46' c McCaw 24' c Jane 35' c Rokocoko 58' m Flynn 79' m Con: Carter (4/7); Pen: Carter 6', 33'

Etihad Stadium, Melbourne
Attendance: 51,409
Referee: Craig Joubert (South Africa)

FB	15	Adam Ashley-Cooper
RW	14	James O'Connor
OC	13	Rob Horne		(substituted off) 55'
IC	12	Berrick Barnes
LW	11	Drew Mitchell	(yellow card) 28' (yellow-red card) 43'
FH	10	Matt Giteau		(substituted off) 77'
SH	9	Will Genia		(substituted off) 76'
N8	8	Richard Brown
OF	7	David Pocock
BF	6	Rocky Elsom (c)
RL	5	Nathan Sharpe		(substituted off) 47'
LL	4	Dean Mumm
TP	3	Salesi Ma'afu		(substituted off) 59'
HK	2	Stephen Moore		(substituted off) 48'
LP	1	Benn Robinson
Replacements:
HK	16	Saia Fainga'a		(substituted on) 48'
PR	17	James Slipper		(substituted on) 59'
LK	18	Rob Simmons		(substituted on) 47'
N8	19	Matt Hodgson
SH	20	Luke Burgess		(substituted on) 76'
FH	21	Anthony Fainga'a		(substituted on) 77'
FB	22	Kurtley Beale		(substituted on) 55'
Coach:
(New Zealand) Robbie Deans

FB	15	Mils Muliaina
RW	14	Cory Jane		(substituted off) 75'
OC	13	Conrad Smith
IC	12	Ma'a Nonu		(substituted off) 71'
LW	11	Joe Rokocoko
FH	10	Dan Carter
SH	9	Jimmy Cowan		(substituted off) 33'
N8	8	Kieran Read
OF	7	Richie McCaw (c)
BF	6	Jerome Kaino
RL	5	Tom Donnelly		(substituted off) 74'
LL	4	Brad Thorn		(substituted off) 60'
TP	3	Owen Franks	(yellow card) 22' to 32'	(substituted off) 43'
HK	2	Keven Mealamu		(substituted off) 71'
LP	1	Tony Woodcock
Replacements:
HK	16	Corey Flynn		(substituted on) 71'
PR	17	Ben Franks		(substituted on) 43'
LK	18	Sam Whitelock		(substituted on) 60'
N8	19	Victor Vito		(substituted on) 74'
SH	20	Piri Weepu		(substituted on) 33'
FH	21	Aaron Cruden		(substituted on) 71'
FB	22	Israel Dagg		(substituted on) 75'
Coach:
(New Zealand) Graham Henry

Touch judges:
Jonathan Kaplan (South Africa)
Cobus Wessels (South Africa)
Television match official:
George Ayoub (Australia)

- Following the match, IRB referee chief Paddy O'Brien announced that Cobus Wessels would be dropped as a touch judge for the upcoming New Zealand–Australia Test because of a number of key errors, most notably Wessels' recommendation that Wallabies wing Drew Mitchell receive the first of his two yellow cards for what O'Brien deemed a marginal penalty. As a result, the IRB made a one-off exception to its standard policy of requiring neutral touch judges and referees for international matches, assigning New Zealander Keith Brown to take Wessels' place.

=== Round 5 ===
7 August 2010
19:35 NZST (UTC+12)

New Zealand	20–10	Australia
Try: Muliaina 6' c Smith 13' c Con: Carter (2/2); Pen: Carter (2/2) 34', 70'	Report	Try: Beale 9' c Con: Giteau (1/1); Pen: Giteau (1/2) 18'

AMI Stadium, Christchurch
Attendance: 38,628
Referee: Jonathan Kaplan (South Africa)

FB	15	Mils Muliaina
RW	14	Cory Jane
OC	13	Conrad Smith
IC	12	Ma'a Nonu
LW	11	Joe Rokocoko
FH	10	Dan Carter
SH	9	Piri Weepu	(substituted off) 75'
N8	8	Kieran Read
OF	7	Richie McCaw (c)
BF	6	Jerome Kaino	(substituted off) 70'
RL	5	Tom Donnelly	(substituted off) 50'
LL	4	Brad Thorn
TP	3	Owen Franks	(substituted off) 42'
HK	2	Keven Mealamu	(substituted off) 76'
LP	1	Tony Woodcock
Replacements:
HK	16	Corey Flynn	(substituted on) 76'
PR	17	Ben Franks	(substituted on) 42'
LK	18	Sam Whitelock	(substituted on) 50'
N8	19	Victor Vito	(substituted on) 70'
SH	20	Alby Mathewson	(substituted on) 75'
FH	21	Aaron Cruden
FB	22	Benson Stanley
Coach:
(New Zealand) Graham Henry

FB	15	Kurtley Beale
RW	14	James O'Connor
OC	13	Adam Ashley-Cooper
IC	12	Anthony Fainga'a
LW	11	Drew Mitchell
FH	10	Matt Giteau
SH	9	Will Genia
N8	8	Richard Brown	(substituted off) 55'
OF	7	David Pocock
BF	6	Rocky Elsom (c)
RL	5	Nathan Sharpe	(substituted off) 65'
LL	4	Dean Mumm
TP	3	Salesi Ma'afu	(substituted off) 64'
HK	2	Saia Fainga'a
LP	1	Benn Robinson
Replacements:
HK	16	Stephen Moore
PR	17	James Slipper	(substituted on) 64'
LK	18	Rob Simmons	(substituted on) 65'
N8	19	Matt Hodgson	(substituted on) 55'
SH	20	Luke Burgess
FH	21	Berrick Barnes
FB	22	Cameron Shepherd
Coach:
(New Zealand) Robbie Deans

Touch judges:
Craig Joubert (South Africa)
Keith Brown (New Zealand)
Television match official:
Cobus Wessels (South Africa)

=== Round 6 ===
21 August 2010
17:00 SAST (UTC+02)

(1 BP) South Africa	22–29	New Zealand
Try: Burger 24' c Con: Steyn (1/1); Pen: Steyn (5/5) 10', 12', 31', 43', 62'	Report	Try: Woodcock 36' m McCaw 77' m Dagg 79' c Con: Carter (1/3); Pen: Carter (4/6) 5', 19', 27', 66'

FNB Stadium, Johannesburg
Attendance: 94,713
Referee: Nigel Owens (Wales)

FB	15	Gio Aplon
RW	14	JP Pietersen
OC	13	Juan de Jongh
IC	12	Jean de Villiers
LW	11	Bryan Habana
FH	10	Morné Steyn
SH	9	Francois Hougaard	(substituted off) 76'
N8	8	Pierre Spies
OF	7	Juan Smith	(substituted off) 58'
BF	6	Schalk Burger
RL	5	Victor Matfield
LL	4	Flip van der Merwe	(substituted off) 69'
TP	3	Jannie du Plessis	(substituted off) 62'
HK	2	John Smit (c)
LP	1	Gurthro Steenkamp
Replacements:
HK	16	Chiliboy Ralepelle
PR	17	CJ van der Linde	(substituted on) 62'
LK	18	Danie Rossouw	(substituted on) 69'
N8	19	Francois Louw	(substituted on) 58'
SH	20	Ricky Januarie	(substituted on) 76'
FH	21	Butch James
FB	22	Wynand Olivier
Coach:
(South Africa) Peter de Villiers

FB	15	Mils Muliaina
RW	14	Cory Jane
OC	13	Conrad Smith
IC	12	Ma'a Nonu
LW	11	Joe Rokocoko	(substituted off) 57'
FH	10	Dan Carter
SH	9	Jimmy Cowan	(substituted off) 42'
N8	8	Kieran Read
OF	7	Richie McCaw (c)
BF	6	Jerome Kaino	(substituted off) 70'
RL	5	Tom Donnelly	(substituted off) 49'
LL	4	Brad Thorn
TP	3	Ben Franks	(substituted off) 62'
HK	2	Keven Mealamu
LP	1	Tony Woodcock
Replacements:
HK	16	Corey Flynn
PR	17	John Afoa	(substituted on) 62'
LK	18	Sam Whitelock	(substituted on) 49'
N8	19	Victor Vito	(substituted on) 70'
SH	20	Piri Weepu	(substituted on) 42'
FH	21	Aaron Cruden
FB	22	Israel Dagg	(substituted on) 57'
Coach:
(New Zealand) Graham Henry

Touch judges:
Alain Rolland (Ireland)
Simon McDowell (Ireland)
Television match official:
Shaun Veldsman (South Africa)

- Springboks captain John Smit became the second Springbok to earn 100 Test caps, after Percy Montgomery.
- The result of this match meant that the All Blacks took the 2010 Tri-Nations title with one match remaining, as well as the Freedom Cup.
- This game also marked the All Blacks' 1000th win in international rugby, including non-Test matches.

=== Round 7 ===
28 August 2010
17:00 SAST (UTC+02)

(1 BP) South Africa	44–31	Australia (1 BP)
Try: Smith 8' c Steenkamp 13' c Spies 31' c F. Steyn 49' c Pietersen 79' c Con: M. Steyn (4/4); James (1/1); Pen: M. Steyn (2/2) 19', 45'; F. Steyn (1/1) 67'	Report	Try: Genia 2' c O'Connor (2) 5' c, 10' c Mumm 25' c Con: Giteau (4/4); Pen: Giteau (1/2) 47'

Loftus Versfeld, Pretoria
Attendance: 43,152
Referee: Alain Rolland (Ireland)

FB	15	François Steyn
RW	14	JP Pietersen
OC	13	Jaque Fourie
IC	12	Jean de Villiers
LW	11	Bryan Habana
FH	10	Morné Steyn	(substituted off) 64'
SH	9	Francois Hougaard
N8	8	Pierre Spies
OF	7	Juan Smith
BF	6	Schalk Burger
RL	5	Victor Matfield
LL	4	Flip van der Merwe	(substituted off) 48'
TP	3	Jannie du Plessis	(substituted off) 53'
HK	2	John Smit (c)	(substituted off) 59'	(substituted on) 79'
LP	1	Gurthro Steenkamp
Replacements:
HK	16	Chiliboy Ralepelle	(substituted on) 59'
PR	17	CJ van der Linde	(substituted on) 53'	(substituted off) 79'
LK	18	Danie Rossouw	(substituted on) 48'
N8	19	Ryan Kankowski
SH	20	Ricky Januarie
FH	21	Butch James	(substituted on) 64'
FB	22	Juan de Jongh
Coach:
(South Africa) Peter de Villiers

FB	15	Kurtley Beale
RW	14	James O'Connor
OC	13	Adam Ashley-Cooper
IC	12	Matt Giteau
LW	11	Drew Mitchell
FH	10	Quade Cooper
SH	9	Will Genia
N8	8	Richard Brown	(substituted off) 57'
OF	7	David Pocock
BF	6	Rocky Elsom (c)
RL	5	Nathan Sharpe	(substituted off) 64'
LL	4	Dean Mumm
TP	3	Salesi Ma'afu	(substituted off) 54'
HK	2	Saia Fainga'a	27' to 38'
LP	1	Benn Robinson
Replacements:
HK	16	Stephen Moore	(substituted on) 27'	(substituted off) 38'
PR	17	James Slipper	(substituted on) 54'
LK	18	Ben McCalman	(substituted on) 57'
N8	19	Rob Simmons	(substituted on) 64'
SH	20	Luke Burgess
FH	21	Berrick Barnes
FB	22	Anthony Fainga'a
Coach:
(New Zealand) Robbie Deans

Touch judges:
Nigel Owens (Wales)
Simon McDowell (Ireland)
Television match official:
Shaun Veldsman (South Africa)

- For the second straight week, a Springbok earned his 100th Test cap, with Victor Matfield reaching this milestone.

=== Round 8 ===
4 September 2010
17:00 SAST (UTC+02)

(1 BP) South Africa	39–41	Australia (1 BP)
Try: Fourie 39'; Steenkamp 45' de Villiers 53'; Con: M. Steyn (3/3) 40', 45', 54'; Pen: M. Steyn (6/6) 5', 17', 49', 60', 69', 75'	Report	Try: Beale 7'; O'Connor 13'; Moore 20'; Elsom 24'; Mitchell 71'; Con: Giteau (4/4) 8', 14', 21', 25'; O'Connor (1/1) 72'; Pen: Giteau (1/1) 1'; Beale (1/1) 79'

Vodacom Park, Bloemfontein
Attendance: 38,523
Referee: Wayne Barnes (England)

FB	15	François Steyn
RW	14	JP Pietersen
OC	13	Jaque Fourie
IC	12	Jean de Villiers
LW	11	Bryan Habana	(substituted off) 50'
FH	10	Morné Steyn
SH	9	Francois Hougaard
N8	8	Pierre Spies	(substituted off) 65'
OF	7	Juan Smith
BF	6	Schalk Burger
RL	5	Victor Matfield
LL	4	Danie Rossouw	(substituted off) 60'
TP	3	Jannie du Plessis	(substituted off) 55'
HK	2	John Smit (c)	(substituted off) 65'
LP	1	Gurthrö Steenkamp
Replacements:
HK	16	Chiliboy Ralepelle	(substituted on) 65'
PR	17	CJ van der Linde	(substituted on) 55'
LK	18	Flip van der Merwe	(substituted on) 60'
N8	19	Ryan Kankowski	(substituted on) 65'
SH	20	Ricky Januarie
FH	21	Juan de Jongh
FB	22	Gio Aplon	(substituted on) 50'
Coach:
(South Africa) Peter de Villiers

FB	15	Kurtley Beale
RW	14	James O'Connor
OC	13	Adam Ashley-Cooper
IC	12	Matt Giteau	(substituted off) 71'
LW	11	Drew Mitchell	(substituted off) 73'
FH	10	Quade Cooper
SH	9	Will Genia	(substituted off) 54'
N8	8	Ben McCalman
OF	7	David Pocock
BF	6	Rocky Elsom (c)
RL	5	Nathan Sharpe
LL	4	Mark Chisholm	(substituted off) 53'
TP	3	Salesi Ma'afu	(substituted off) 22'
HK	2	Stephen Moore	(substituted off) 65'
LP	1	Benn Robinson
Replacements:
HK	16	Saia Fainga'a	(substituted on) 65'
PR	17	James Slipper	(substituted on) 22'
LK	18	Dean Mumm	(substituted on) 53'
N8	19	Richard Brown
SH	20	Luke Burgess	(substituted on) 54'
FH	21	Berrick Barnes	(substituted on) 71'
FB	22	Anthony Fainga'a	(substituted on) 73'
Coach:
(New Zealand) Robbie Deans

Touch judges:
Nigel Owens (Wales)
Simon McDowell (Ireland)
Television match official:
Johann Meuwesen (South Africa)

- This was the Wallabies' first win on the Highveld since 1963.
- John Smit earned his 102nd Test cap, equalling the South Africa record of Percy Montgomery.
- Morné Steyn extended his personal streak of successful kicks at goal in Tests to 38. Statistics on success rates of goal kickers were not kept until the late 1980s, but it is very likely that Steyn has set an all-time record. Steyn surpassed the previous (recorded) best of Scotland's Chris Paterson at 36.

=== Round 9 ===
11 September 2010
20:00 AEST (UTC+10)

(1 BP) Australia	22–23	New Zealand
Try: O'Connor 16'; Ashley-Cooper 46'; Pen: Giteau (3/) 6', 31', 40'; Beale (1/1) 59'	Report	Try: McCaw 67'; Read 73'; Con: Weepu (2/2) 68', 73'; Pen: Weepu (3/3) 2', 10', 52'

ANZ Stadium, Sydney
Attendance: 70,288
Referee: Mark Lawrence (South Africa)

FB	15	Kurtley Beale
RW	14	James O'Connor
OC	13	Adam Ashley-Cooper	(substituted off) 79'
IC	12	Matt Giteau
LW	11	Lachie Turner
FH	10	Quade Cooper	(substituted off) 73'
SH	9	Will Genia	(substituted off) 72'
N8	8	Ben McCalman	(substituted off) 73'
OF	7	David Pocock
BF	6	Rocky Elsom (c)
RL	5	Nathan Sharpe
LL	4	Mark Chisholm	(substituted off) 56'
TP	3	Salesi Ma'afu	(substituted off) 52'
HK	2	Stephen Moore
LP	1	Benn Robinson
Replacements:
HK	16	Huia Edmonds
PR	17	James Slipper	(substituted on) 52'
LK	18	Dean Mumm	(substituted on) 56'
N8	19	Richard Brown	(substituted on) 73'
SH	20	Luke Burgess	(substituted on) 72'
FH	21	Berrick Barnes	(substituted on) 73'
IC	22	Anthony Fainga'a	(substituted on) 79'
Coach:
(New Zealand) Robbie Deans

FB	15	Mils Muliaina
RW	14	Cory Jane	(substituted off) 69'
OC	13	Conrad Smith
IC	12	Ma'a Nonu
LW	11	Israel Dagg
FH	10	Aaron Cruden	(substituted off) 60'
SH	9	Piri Weepu	(substituted off) 79'
N8	8	Kieran Read
OF	7	Richie McCaw (c)
BF	6	Victor Vito	(substituted off) 49'
RL	5	Tom Donnelly	(substituted off) 61'
LL	4	Brad Thorn
TP	3	Owen Franks	(substituted off) 61'
HK	2	Keven Mealamu	(substituted off) 11'
LP	1	Tony Woodcock
Replacements:
HK	16	Corey Flynn	(substituted on) 11'
PR	17	John Afoa	(substituted on) 61'
LK	18	Anthony Boric	(substituted on) 61'
N8	19	Jerome Kaino	(substituted on) 49'
SH	20	Jimmy Cowan	(substituted on) 79'
FH	21	Colin Slade	(substituted on) 60'
WG	22	Rene Ranger	(substituted on) 69'
Coach:
(New Zealand) Graham Henry

Touch judges:
Jonathan Kaplan (South Africa)
Christie du Preez (South Africa)
Television match official:
Matt Goddard (Australia)

Source: Tri Nations Web

- This test was a milestone for Richie McCaw, who surpassed Sean Fitzpatrick as the most-capped New Zealand captain.
- The win is the 10th win in a row for New Zealand over Australia, a new record.
- New Zealand are the first team in the Tri Nations series to win undefeated since 2003, and set records for the most points (184) and tries scored (22).

== Player statistics ==
=== Leading try scorers ===
Top try scorers
Pos	Name	Team	Tries
1	Mils Muliaina	New Zealand	4
1	James O'Connor	Australia	4
3	Richie McCaw	New Zealand	3
3	Drew Mitchell	Australia	3
3	Gurthrö Steenkamp	South Africa	3
6	Adam Ashley-Cooper	Australia	2
6	Kurtley Beale	Australia	2
6	Schalk Burger	South Africa	2
6	Israel Dagg	New Zealand	2
6	Rocky Elsom	Australia	2
6	Jaque Fourie	South Africa	2
6	Will Genia	Australia	2
6	Ma'a Nonu	New Zealand	2
6	Kieran Read	New Zealand	2
6	Conrad Smith	New Zealand	2
6	Tony Woodcock	New Zealand	2

Source: scrum.com

=== Leading point scorers ===
Top 5 point scorers
Pos	Name	Team	Points
1	Morné Steyn	South Africa	77
2	Matt Giteau	Australia	64
3	Dan Carter	New Zealand	63
4	James O'Connor	Australia	27
5	Mils Muliaina	New Zealand	20

Source: scrum.com

== See also ==
- History of rugby union matches between Australia and South Africa
- History of rugby union matches between Australia and New Zealand
- History of rugby union matches between New Zealand and South Africa
