= 2008 Tri Nations Series =

- Date: 5 July – 13 September

Final positions
- Champions: New Zealand (9th title)
- Bledisloe Cup: New Zealand
- Freedom Cup: New Zealand
- Mandela Challenge Plate: Australia

Tournament statistics
- Matches played: 9
- Tries scored: 43 (4.78 per match)
- Attendance: 444,707 (49,412 per match)
- Top scorer(s): Dan Carter (82)
- Most tries: Jongi Nokwe (4)

The 2008 Tri Nations Series was the thirteenth annual Tri Nations competition between the national rugby union teams of New Zealand, Australia and South Africa. The All Blacks won the series on 13 September 2008 after defeating Australia in the last match of the series.

== Background ==
This was the first Tri Nations tournament after South Africa's 2007 Rugby World Cup victory, and they went into the competition as the top team in the IRB World Rankings (having ended a 175-week run for New Zealand). On 30 June 2008, before the tournament began, New Zealand and Australia were ranked second and third in the world respectively.

The All Blacks went into the series with a world record 29 successive home victories, and South Africa with a 13 match winning streak.

By the end of the tournament New Zealand had retaken top place in the IRB World Rankings. After 26 weeks at number one, South Africa slipped to second. Australia remained third.

The final match of the Bledisloe Cup series between Australia and New Zealand took place after the Tri-Nations, on 1 November (the first 3 matches of the series were part of the Tri-Nations).

== Experimental Law Variations ==
Several of the sport's Experimental Law Variations (or ELVs) were trialled as part of the 2008 Tri Nations. A global trial of 13 ELVs at all levels is to be conducted for one year from 1 August 2008. The Tri Nation's governing body SANZAR approved the trial of all the ELVs that had been included in the 2008 Super 14 season, as well as the ELVs to be trialled globally. Statistics from the 2008 Super 14 revealed the ELVs increased the number of tries, reduced the number of line-outs and penalties, increased the number of free kicks, but did not change the number of scrums or mauls. The changes increased the attacking opportunities from scrums.

== Standings ==
Place	Nation	Games				Points			Bonus points	Table points
Place	Nation	Played	Won	Drawn	Lost	For	Against	Difference	Bonus points	Table points
1	New Zealand	6	4	0	2	152	106	+46	3	19
2	Australia	6	3	0	3	119	163	−44	2	14
3	South Africa	6	2	0	4	115	117	−2	2	10

== Results ==
=== Round 1 ===
5 July 2008
19:35 NZST (UTC+12)

New Zealand	19–8	South Africa
Try: Kaino 45' c Con: Carter (1/1) 46'; Pen: Carter (4/5) 5', 21', 29', 71'		Try: Habana 37' m Pen: James (1/2) 6'

Wellington Regional Stadium, Wellington
Attendance: 36,568
Referee: Stuart Dickinson (Australia)

FB	15	Mils Muliaina
RW	14	Rudi Wulf
OC	13	Conrad Smith
IC	12	Ma'a Nonu
LW	11	Sitiveni Sivivatu	(substituted off) 69'
FH	10	Dan Carter
SH	9	Andy Ellis	(substituted off) 74'
N8	8	Jerome Kaino
OF	7	Rodney So'oialo (c)
BF	6	Adam Thomson	(substituted off) 61'
RL	5	Ali Williams
LL	4	Brad Thorn
TP	3	Greg Somerville	(substituted off) 74'
HK	2	Andrew Hore	(substituted off) 72'
LP	1	Tony Woodcock
Replacements:
HK	16	Keven Mealamu	(substituted on) 72'
PR	17	Neemia Tialata	(substituted on) 74'
LK	18	Anthony Boric
N8	19	Sione Lauaki	(substituted on) 61'
SH	20	Jimmy Cowan	(substituted on) 74'
FH	21	Stephen Donald
FB	22	Leon MacDonald	(substituted on) 69'
Coach:
(New Zealand) Graham Henry

FB	15	Conrad Jantjes	(substituted off) 63'
RW	14	Odwa Ndungane
OC	13	Adrian Jacobs
IC	12	Jean de Villiers
LW	11	Bryan Habana
FH	10	Butch James	(substituted off) 58'
SH	9	Ricky Januarie	(substituted off) 72'
N8	8	Joe van Niekerk	(substituted off) 58'
OF	7	Juan Smith
BF	6	Schalk Burger
RL	5	Victor Matfield
LL	4	Bakkies Botha	(substituted off) 72'
TP	3	CJ van der Linde	(substituted off) 46'
HK	2	John Smit (c)	(substituted off) 38'
LP	1	Gurthro Steenkamp
Replacements:
HK	16	Bismarck du Plessis	(substituted on) 38'
PR	17	Brian Mujati	(substituted on) 46'
LK	18	Andries Bekker	(substituted on) 72'
FL	19	Luke Watson	(substituted on) 58'
SH	20	Bolla Conradie	(substituted on) 72'
FH	21	François Steyn	(substituted on) 58'
FB	22	Percy Montgomery	(substituted on) 63'
Coach:
(South Africa) Peter de Villiers

Touch judges:
Matt Goddard (Australia)
Paul Marks (Australia)
Television match official:
George Ayoub (Australia)

=== Round 2 ===
12 July 2008
19:35 NZST (UTC+12)

(1 BP) New Zealand	28–30	South Africa
Tries: Lauaki 56' c Con: Carter (1/1) 57'; Pen: Carter (6/6) 5', 10', 17', 25', 40', 74'; Drop: Carter (1/1) 66'		Tries: Pietersen 32' m Januarie 75' c Con: Steyn (1/1) 76'; Pen: Montgomery (3/4) 13', 20', 23'; James (2/2) 63', 68'; Drop: James (1/1) 37'

Carisbrook, Dunedin
Attendance: 32,210
Referee: Matt Goddard (Australia)

FB	15	Mils Muliaina
RW	14	Rudi Wulf
OC	13	Conrad Smith
IC	12	Ma'a Nonu
LW	11	Sitiveni Sivivatu	(substituted off) 40'
FH	10	Dan Carter
SH	9	Andy Ellis
N8	8	Jerome Kaino	(substituted off) 53'
OF	7	Rodney So'oialo (c)
BF	6	Adam Thomson
RL	5	Ali Williams	(substituted off) 29'
LL	4	Anthony Boric
TP	3	John Afoa	(substituted off) 70'
HK	2	Andrew Hore	(substituted off) 56'
LP	1	Tony Woodcock
Replacements:
HK	16	Keven Mealamu	(substituted on) 56'
PR	17	Neemia Tialata	(substituted on) 70'
LK	18	Kevin O'Neill	(substituted on) 29'
N8	19	Sione Lauaki	(substituted on) 53'
SH	20	Jimmy Cowan
FH	21	Stephen Donald
FB	22	Leon MacDonald	(substituted on) 40'
Coach:
(New Zealand) Graham Henry

FB	15	Percy Montgomery		(substituted off) 60'
RW	14	JP Pietersen
OC	13	Adrian Jacobs		(substituted off) 47'
IC	12	Jean de Villiers
LW	11	Bryan Habana
FH	10	Butch James		(substituted off) 74'
SH	9	Ricky Januarie
N8	8	Joe van Niekerk		(substituted off) 60'
OF	7	Juan Smith
BF	6	Schalk Burger
RL	5	Victor Matfield (c)	(yellow card) 73' to 80'
LL	4	Bakkies Botha		(substituted off) 50'	(substituted on) 60'	(substituted off) 67'
TP	3	CJ van der Linde
HK	2	Bismarck du Plessis		(substituted off) 74'
LP	1	Gurthro Steenkamp		(substituted off) 53'	(substituted on) 60'
Replacements:
HK	16	Schalk Brits		(substituted on) 74'
PR	17	Brian Mujati		(substituted on) 53'	(substituted off) 60'
LK	18	Andries Bekker		(substituted on) 50'	(substituted off) 60'	(substituted on) 67'
FL	19	Luke Watson		(substituted on) 60'
SH	20	Ruan Pienaar		(substituted on) 74'
FH	21	François Steyn		(substituted on) 47'
FB	22	Conrad Jantjes		(substituted on) 60'
Coach:
(South Africa) Peter de Villiers

Touch judges:
Paul Marks (Australia)
James Leckie (Australia)
Television match official:
George Ayoub (Australia)

- The Springboks get their first win over the All Blacks at Carisbrook, and their first win in New Zealand since 1998

=== Round 3 ===
19 July 2008
18:00 AWST (UTC+08)

Australia	16–9	South Africa (1 BP)
Tries: Tuqiri 36' m Mortlock 46' m Pen: Giteau (1/1) 53'; Drop: Barnes (1/1) 79'		Pen: Steyn (2/3) 5', 74'; James (1/1) 55'

Subiaco Oval, Perth
Attendance: 41,838
Referee: Bryce Lawrence (New Zealand)

=== Round 4 ===
26 July 2008
20:00 AEST (UTC+10)

(1 BP) Australia	34–19	New Zealand
Tries: Cross 10' c Hynes 31' c Elsom 55' c Horwill 74' c Con: Giteau (4/4); Pen: Giteau (1/1) 6'; Drop: Giteau (1/1) 65'		Tries: Muliaina 24' m Hore 39' c Ellis 45' c Con: Carter (2/3)

Stadium Australia, Sydney
Attendance: 78,944
Referee: Craig Joubert (South Africa)

FB	15	Adam Ashley-Cooper
RW	14	Peter Hynes
OC	13	Ryan Cross
IC	12	Berrick Barnes
LW	11	Lote Tuqiri
FH	10	Matt Giteau
SH	9	Luke Burgess
N8	8	Wycliff Palu
OF	7	George Smith (c)
BF	6	Rocky Elsom
RL	5	Nathan Sharpe
LL	4	James Horwill
TP	3	Al Baxter
HK	2	Stephen Moore
LP	1	Benn Robinson
Replacements:
HK	16	Tatafu Polota-Nau
PR	17	Matt Dunning
LK	18	Daniel Vickerman
N8	19	Phil Waugh
SH	20	Sam Cordingley
FH	21	Timana Tahu
FB	22	Drew Mitchell
Coach:
(New Zealand) Robbie Deans

FB	15	Mils Muliaina
RW	14	Anthony Tuitavake
OC	13	Richard Kahui
IC	12	Ma'a Nonu
LW	11	Sitiveni Sivivatu
FH	10	Dan Carter
SH	9	Andy Ellis
N8	8	Jerome Kaino
OF	7	Daniel Braid
BF	6	Rodney So'oialo (c)
RL	5	Ali Williams
LL	4	Brad Thorn
TP	3	Greg Somerville
HK	2	Andrew Hore
LP	1	Tony Woodcock
Replacements:
HK	16	Keven Mealamu
PR	17	John Afoa
LK	18	Anthony Boric
N8	19	Sione Lauaki
SH	20	Jimmy Cowan
FH	21	Stephen Donald
FB	22	Conrad Smith
Coach:
(New Zealand) Graham Henry

Touch judges:
Mark Lawrence (South Africa)
James Bolabiu (Fiji)
Television match official:
Shaun Veldsman (South Africa)

=== Round 5 ===
2 August 2008
19:35 NZST (UTC+12)

(1 BP) New Zealand	39–10	Australia
Tries: Woodcock (2) 21' c, 24' m Nonu (2) 45' c, 80' m Con: Carter (2/4); Pen: Carter (5/5) 6', 14', 39', 58', 65'		Try: Ashley-Cooper 32' c Con: Giteau (1/1); Pen: Giteau (1/1) 4'

Eden Park, Auckland
Attendance: 45,000
Referee: Mark Lawrence (South Africa)

FB	15	Mils Muliaina
RW	14	Richard Kahui
OC	13	Conrad Smith
IC	12	Ma'a Nonu
LW	11	Sitiveni Sivivatu
FH	10	Dan Carter
SH	9	Jimmy Cowan
N8	8	Rodney So'oialo
OF	7	Richie McCaw(c)
BF	6	Jerome Kaino
RL	5	Ali Williams
LL	4	Brad Thorn
TP	3	Greg Somerville
HK	2	Andrew Hore
LP	1	Tony Woodcock
Replacements:
HK	16	Keven Mealamu
PR	17	John Afoa
LK	18	Anthony Boric
N8	19	Adam Thomson
SH	20	Piri Weepu
FH	21	Stephen Donald
FB	22	Anthony Tuitavake
Coach:
(New Zealand) Graham Henry

FB	15	Adam Ashley-Cooper
RW	14	Peter Hynes
OC	13	Stirling Mortlock(c)
IC	12	Berrick Barnes
LW	11	Lote Tuqiri
FH	10	Matt Giteau
SH	9	Luke Burgess
N8	8	Wycliff Palu
OF	7	George Smith
BF	6	Phil Waugh
RL	5	Nathan Sharpe
LL	4	James Horwill
TP	3	Al Baxter
HK	2	Stephen Moore
LP	1	Benn Robinson
Replacements:
HK	16	Tatafu Polota-Nau
PR	17	Matt Dunning
LK	18	Daniel Vickerman
N8	19	Hugh McMeniman
SH	20	Sam Cordingley
FH	21	Ryan Cross
FB	22	Drew Mitchell
Coach:
(New Zealand) Robbie Deans

Touch judges:
Craig Joubert (South Africa)
James Bolabiu (Fiji)
Television match official:
Shaun Veldsman (South Africa)

=== Round 6 ===
16 August 2008
15:00 SAST (UTC+02)

South Africa	0–19	New Zealand
		Tries: Smith 7' m Carter 66' c Mealamu 72' c Con: Carter (2/3)

Newlands Stadium, Cape Town
Attendance: 52,000
Referee: Matt Goddard (Australia)

- This match saw two players reach major milestones:
  - Dan Carter became the ninth player in history with 800 Test points.
  - Percy Montgomery became the ninth player in history to earn his 100th Test cap.

=== Round 7 ===
23 August 2008
15:00 SAST (UTC+02)

South Africa	15–27	Australia
Tries: Jacobs (2) 65' c, 71' m Con: Montgomery (1/2) 66'; Pen: James (1/1) 44'		Tries: Robinson 27' c Tuqiri 61' c Mortlock 67' c Con: Giteau (3/3) 28', 62', 68'; Pen: Giteau (2/3) 9', 50'

Kings Park Stadium, Durban
Attendance: 50,000
Referee: Lyndon Bray (New Zealand)

=== Round 8 ===
30 August 2008
15:00 SAST (UTC+02)

(1 BP) South Africa	53–8	Australia
Tries: Bekker 8' c Nokwe (4) 12' m, 25' m, 35' c, 49' m Jacobs 44' c Pienaar 68' c Ndungane 78' c Con: James (3/6); Montgomery (2/2); Pen: James (1/1) 31'		Try: Mitchell 55' m Pen: Giteau (1/1) 5'

Ellis Park Stadium, Johannesburg
Attendance: 54,819
Referee: Bryce Lawrence (New Zealand)

=== Round 9 ===
13 September 2008
20:00 AEST (UTC+10)

(1 BP) Australia	24–28	New Zealand (1 BP)
Tries: Ashley-Cooper 40' c Horwill 45' c Cross 78' c Con: Giteau (3/3) 40+1', 46', 79'; Pen: Giteau (1/2) 22'		Tries: Muliaina 13' c Woodcock 49' c Weepu 62' c Carter 67' c Con: Carter (4/4) 14', 50', 63', 68'

Lang Park, Brisbane
Attendance: 52,328
Referee: Jonathan Kaplan (South Africa)
