= Tony Woodcock =

Tony Woodcock may refer to:

- Tony Woodcock (footballer) (born 1955), retired England international footballer
- Tony Woodcock (rugby union) (born 1981), New Zealand rugby union player
