= Kevin O'Neill (rugby union) =

NZ international rugby union player

- Born: Kevin O'Neill
- Height: 2.01 m (6 ft 7 in)
- Weight: 115 kg (18 st 2 lb)

Rugby union career
- Position: Lock
Provincial / State sides
Years	Team	Apps	(Points)
2004–07	Canterbury	36	(10)
2008–09	Waikato	17	(0)
Super Rugby
Years	Team	Apps	(Points)
2005–07	Crusaders	12	(0)
2008–10	Chiefs	33	(0)
2011	Rebels	7	(0)
International career
Years	Team	Apps	(Points)
2008	New Zealand	1	(0)

Kevin O'Neill is a rugby union player who plays for Waikato Rugby Union in the Air New Zealand Cup and for the All Blacks. His position is lock.

== Career ==
=== Provincial Rugby ===
Kevin debuted in 2003 for Canterbury in 2003 in a warm-up match against Fiji who were on the build-up to the 2003 Rugby World Cup. He played for Canterbury until 2007 after 29 caps for Canterbury he transferred to Waikato.

=== Super 14 ===
Kevin debuted for the Crusaders. He played a number of games beside All Black, Chris Jack. He was drafted to the Chiefs and since then has signed with them ending his career in Christchurch. O'Neill played most games for the Chiefs in 2008.

== Representative Squads ==
=== New Zealand Under 21 ===
O'Neill played in the World Cup winning under 21s in 2003 alongside fellow All Black, Adam Thomson.

=== Junior All Blacks ===
He was a member of the 2005 Junior All Blacks.

== All Black debut ==
O'Neill earned a single All Blacks cap when he came off the bench in a test against the Springboks in Dunedin in 2008. On 12 July 2008, at Carisbrook, after 28 minutes O'Neill made his debut for the All Blacks after a knock to Ali Williams caused him to leave the field. The All Blacks went down to the Springboks 30 - 28 after a chip and chase from Ricky Januarie resulted in a match winning try. It was the All Blacks' first loss at Carisbrook to the Springboks. O’Neill never played for the All Blacks again.
