= Kieran Read =

New Zealand rugby union player (born 1985)

Kieran Read ONZM
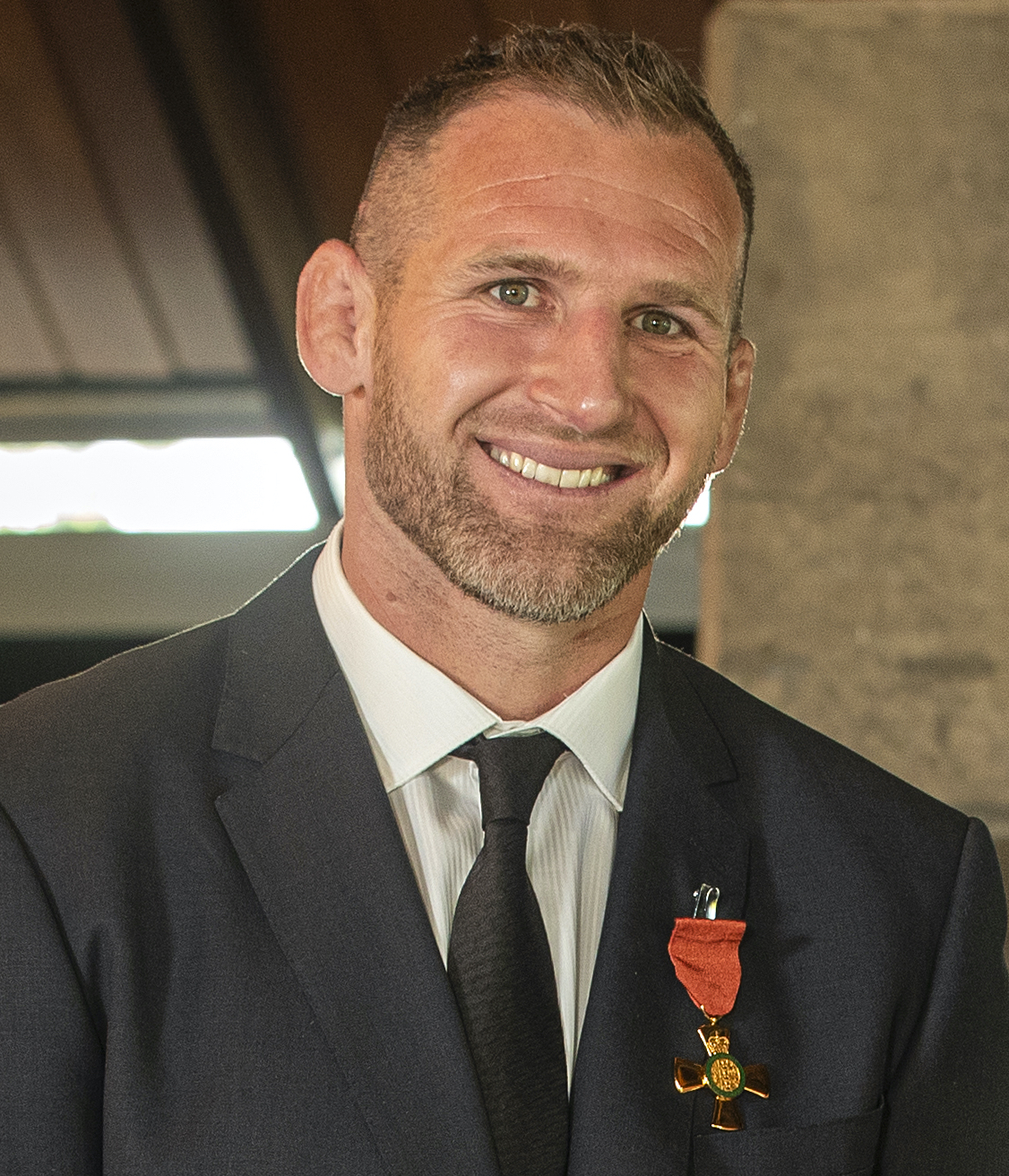
- Read in 2020
- Born: Kieran James Read; 26 October 1985 (age 41) Papakura, New Zealand
- Height: 193 cm (6 ft 4 in)
- Weight: 111 kg (245 lb; 17 st 7 lb)
- School: Rosehill College
- University: University of Canterbury
- Notable relative: Ruby Harper (Cousin)

Rugby union career
- Position(s): Number 8, Flanker
Senior career
Years	Team	Apps	(Points)
2020–2021	Toyota Verblitz	10	(10)
Provincial / State sides
Years	Team	Apps	(Points)
2006–2016	Canterbury	38	(45)
2017–2020	Counties Manukau	5	(5)
Super Rugby
Years	Team	Apps	(Points)
2007–2019	Crusaders	156	(125)
International career
Years	Team	Apps	(Points)
2005–2006	New Zealand U21	10	(0)
2007	Junior All Blacks	3	(0)
2008–2019	New Zealand	127	(130)
Medal record
Men's Rugby union
Representing New Zealand
Rugby World Cup
Gold medal – first place	2011 New Zealand	Squad
Gold medal – first place	2015 England	Squad
Bronze medal – third place	2019 Japan	Squad

Kieran James Read ONZM (born 26 October 1985) is a New Zealand former rugby union player. He played as a number 8 and is a former captain of the New Zealand national team, the All Blacks.

Read played for New Zealand from 2008 to 2019. He is one of the most-capped players of all time, and the fifth-most-capped All Black in history, having played 127 tests, scoring 26 international tries. Read captained New Zealand 52 times.

He was the IRB Player of the Year in 2013 and a key member of New Zealand's 2011 and 2015 World Cup-winning teams, becoming one of only 43 players to have won multiple men's Rugby World Cups.

Read played for the Crusaders in the Super Rugby competition, and played for Canterbury and Counties Manukau in the Mitre 10 Cup, before spending his final season in Japan with Toyota Verblitz.

== Early life ==
Read played his childhood rugby in the small town of Drury in the Counties Manukau region, just south of Auckland. He attended Opaheke Primary where his mother taught and Rosehill College, with a one-year interlude at Saint Kentigern College in 2000. Read excelled in all aspects of school life, but especially on the sports field. He gained excellent marks through to the end of seventh form. He was Head Boy of the 2000-student Rosehill College, as well as Sportsman of the Year and Sports All-rounder of the Year. Read was a talented cricketer, representing Northern District age-group teams and being selected for the New Zealand Under-17 tournament side in 2002.

== Professional career ==
=== Provincial ===
Despite his age-group success as a cricket batsman, Read focused his efforts on rugby. One year after leaving school, he began his professional career in the Canterbury development squad. Read played his first National Provincial Championship game in 2006, his second year out of college.

=== Super Rugby ===
Read played for the Crusaders in the Super 14 in 2007 as a blindside flanker. He moved to number 8 during the 2008 season, culminating in the squad winning the Super Rugby title.

He first captained the side in 2011, standing in for an injured Richie McCaw. In 2012, Read led the team for their first 10 matches while McCaw was rested. In 2013, another extended rest for McCaw saw Read named captain, although he missed six consecutive games with a toe injury.

Read was captain of the Crusaders from 2014 to 2016, but disappointingly the team did not make the 2015 playoffs. Read was relieved of captaincy when new coach Scott Robertson took over for the 2017 season, with Read missing the first half of the season due to wrist surgery. Sam Whitelock succeeded Read as captain, with Matt Todd and Ryan Crotty as vice captains. Read only played in 7 matches for the Crusaders that year, including starting in the final which was a 25–17 win over the Lions. Read scored 6 tries for the Crusaders that year, including two doubles.

Read missed many Super Rugby games again in the 2018 Super Rugby season, struggling with injury. Read returned to professional rugby from injury following the Steinlager series against France. This saw Read start for the Crusaders in the 2018 Super Rugby Final on 4 August that year. Read produced a high-level performance in the game and helped his team beat the Lions once again in the final, with the Crusaders winning 37–18. This was the first time in 10 years that the Crusaders won a Super Rugby final at home and Read was the only remaining player from the 2008 Super 14 season's final left.

== All Blacks ==
=== Early years ===
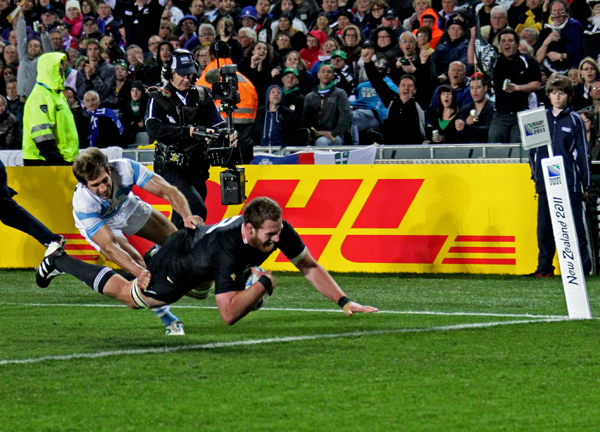
Read scoring a try at the 2011 Rugby World Cup

Read was first selected for the All Blacks for the end-of-season tour in 2008, making his debut in a 32–6 win against Scotland on 8 November. Read started at blindside flanker and played the full 80 minutes that match. Read came off the bench for another three fixtures on the tour.

In 2009 he was retained for the All Blacks' two-test series against France, starting in the first test which was lost by the All Blacks 22–27. Read started against France the following week at number 8, his preferred position and finished off the All Blacks' 14–10 win having played every minute of the series. Read started in tandem with Jerome Kaino as blindside flanker- this was a combination the All Blacks would continue to use for the better part of a decade. Read started another seven times in 2009 and became the All Blacks' first-choice number 8 that year, displacing the now retired 62-test veteran and former stand-in captain Rodney So'oialo from the starting team.

Read scored his first international try for the All Blacks on 12 June 2010 when the team beat Ireland 66–28. Read's opposite Jamie Heaslip was red-carded, while Read ran rampant on the Irish defence. Read carried a heavy workload that year and started in all 14 tests for the All Blacks in 2010, being one of only two players to do so, with captain Richie McCaw also playing in all 14 tests. Read was the second-to-highest try-scoring All Black in 2010 and, second only to fullback Mils Muliaina who scored 7 tries in 2010. Read scored another 5 tries in 2010, scoring tries in wins against South Africa, Australia and England. Read finished his 2010 season with world-class performances against Ireland and Wales, scoring the first double of his career in a 38–18 win over Ireland. Read was named New Zealand Rugby Player of the Year, being chosen over Richie McCaw who was named World Rugby's Player of the Year for the third time and second year running.

Read was named in the All Blacks' 30-man squad for the 2011 Rugby World Cup, which was hosted by New Zealand. He played in four of the team's seven matches – the pool game against Canada, the quarter-final against Argentina, the semi-final against Australia, and the final against France. The All Blacks became world champions for the second time by beating France 8–7 in the final.

=== 2012–2015 ===
Read had another big year for the All Blacks in 2012 and played 12 tests that year. On 17 November 2012, Read became the 66th All Blacks captain when he led the team for the first time, against Italy at Rome's Olympic Stadium in 2012, scoring a try to help the All Blacks win the match 42–10.

Following Richie McCaw's decision to take a sabbatical for the first half of 2013, Read was named captain of the All Blacks for the three-test series against France in McCaw's absence. On 15 June 2013, Read captained the team for the third time in his 50th test, which coincided with All Blacks' 500th test match, in the second game of the series between New Zealand and France at AMI Stadium. The All Blacks won 30–0. Read captained the All Blacks another three times in the year, scoring two tries against South Africa in the first 20 minutes of the game, but missed out on the chance to score a third after being yellow-carded with six minutes to go.

Read won the 2013 IRB Player of the Year title after playing in 13 of the 14 All Black tests that year, becoming the third New Zealander to win the award after teammates Dan Carter and Richie McCaw. He also won the top national rugby player award. Read was not subbed off all year, only missing 20 minutes of the 13 tests he played due to yellow cards against South Africa and England.

Read missed the first two tests of 2014 due to concussion, with Jerome Kaino starting at number 8 in his absence. Read made his return to international rugby from injury on 21 June 2014 when the All Blacks beat England 36–13. Read only played for 40 minutes against England, with Liam Messam replacing him at half-time. Read scored two tries in 2014, assisting the All Blacks to get through Australia 51–20 on 23 August 2014 and finishing the 2014 All Blacks season, scoring the final try against Wales on 22 November 2014. Read captained the All Blacks for the eighth time in his career earlier that year on 1 November 2014, leading the team to a 74–6 win against the United States in Chicago.

On 17 June 2015, against Argentina at Christchurch, Kieran Read scored his 18th try and moved past former All Black Zinzan Brooke as the most prolific try-scoring New Zealand Number 8 at test level.

Read played in all seven All Blacks matches in the 2015 Rugby World Cup, which was held in England and ultimately won by New Zealand. He captained the side to a 47–9 win against Tonga during the Pool rounds of the competition when Richie McCaw was rested. Read started in all three knockout rounds of the World Cup, scoring his third try of the 2015 season and second of the competition when the All Blacks thrashed France 62–13 in the quarter-final. Read continued to play an important part in the 2015 World Cup, playing the full 80 minutes of the semi-final's narrow 20–18 win over South Africa and the All Blacks' historic 34–17 victory over Australia in the final on 31 October 2015. With vice-captain Conrad Smith replaced by Sonny Bill Williams at halftime and Richie McCaw replaced by Sam Cane with only a minute left, Read captained the All Blacks for the final few seconds of the final before earning his second World Cup victors' medal, becoming one of only 20 players to win multiple Rugby World Cups.

=== 2016–2017 ===
In 2016, Read was promoted to Captain of the All Blacks, succeeding the long-serving McCaw who announced his retirement at the end of the 2015 Rugby World Cup. Read carried a heavy workload in 2016, starting as captain in every test but one. Read was only subbed off once that year, being replaced with four minutes to go in the second test against Argentina by Highlanders flanker Elliot Dixon.

Read returned from a broken thumb to captain the All Blacks against the British & Irish Lions in 2017, making worldwide headlines with a performance that won him the Man of The Match award and included a bone-crushing tackle on Lions first-five and three-time World Rugby Player of the Year nominee Owen Farrell. Read was replaced by Scott Barrett with four minutes left of the first test, with the All Blacks winning 30–15. Read captained the team in his 100th test, becoming only the eighth All Black to do so, in the third test of the Lions series, on 8 July 2017, ending in a drawn series to the two sides after the third test was a 15–15 draw.

Read continued as captain of the All Blacks for the rest of 2017, scoring two tries in the second test against Argentina on 1 October 2017, bringing his career tally to 23 after being set up for his first try by Waisake Naholo and set up by newcomer Damian McKenzie for a second. Due to All Blacks Vice-Captain Ben Smith taking a sabbatical, Julian Savea being dropped at the end of the Lions series after poor performances internationally and in Super Rugby, as well as Israel Dagg's season-ending knee injury, this meant Read had now extended his lead as the most prolific try-scorer of any player in New Zealand's 2017 Rugby Championship squad. Despite this, Read was surpassed as the highest try-scorer in the current team by 2016 and 2017 World Rugby Player of the Year, Beauden Barrett, later in the year when New Zealand beat Scotland 22–17 at Murrayfield. This was also Read's 100th start in the number 8 jersey and his last test for the 2017 season, due to his need for back surgery to relieve chronic pain in his leg. Crusaders captain Sam Whitelock captained the All Blacks for the year's final test, against Wales, in Read's absence.

=== 2018 ===
Read did not play in the All Blacks' three-test series against France during June 2018, having only recovered from injury in May. The All Blacks were captained by Sam Whitelock in Read's absence, with Ben Smith and Sam Cane as Vice-Captains. Highlanders loose forward, Luke Whitelock, stood in for Read at number 8 and cemented his place as Read's back-up during the series.

Read returned to Super Rugby following the end of the French tour, having made his debut for Counties Manukau the week after the series finished. Read made a full recovery from injury and started for the Crusaders in all three playoff matches of the 2018 Super Rugby season, including the final on 4 August 2018. Read played a big part in the Crusaders' victorious effort in the final and had returned to peak form in time. The Crusaders beat the Lions in the final for the second year in a row, winning 37–18.

Read returned to international rugby as All Black captain for the 2018 Rugby Championship, with Sam Whitelock stepping down from Captaincy. Read led the All Blacks to win the Bledisloe Cup for the 16th year in a row in the first two rounds of the competition, as well as a third-round victory against Los Pumas, which was won by 46–24. Read was replaced in the 58th minute of round three by Luke Whitelock.

The Rugby Championship's fourth round bought the biggest shock of Read's career, with the All Blacks losing to a resurgent South Africa, at home, on 15 September 2018. Read stayed composed until the end of the game, which could have been a late win but for Beauden Barrett's goal-kicking. Following the narrow 34–36 loss against South Africa, Read was rested for round five, with Ardie Savea starting at number 8, and Sam Whitelock captaining the team in his place.

Read returned from rest on 6 October for the Rugby Championship's last test, in the sixth round, which was against South Africa. Although South Africa threatened to win against the All Blacks for the second time in a row, following Read being penalised, Read lead the All Blacks to a narrow 32–30 victory, with his Crusaders team-mate Richie Mo'unga converting a late Ardie Savea try to win.

The 2018 end-of-season tour was a mixed tour for Read, who still hadn't fully recovered from injury. Read was praised for performances against Australia and England, but the All Blacks did lose to Ireland, 9–16, on 17 November 2018. Read was one of the poorer performing players on the field in the loss to Ireland, earning him criticism from the media. Although Read was criticised by the media for his performance against Ireland, he finished the year off Captaining the All Blacks to a 66–3 victory over Italy. Read equalled the record of former teammate Tony Woodcock, for the third-to-most capped All Black in history during the victory over Italy, and is set to overtake Woodcock in 2019.

=== 2019 ===
Before the 2020 Super Rugby season started, Read confirmed that he would not re-sign with the New Zealand Rugby Union, following the 2019 Rugby World Cup in Japan.

After missing a test against Argentina during the 2019 Rugby Championship, Read went on to Captain New Zealand in all four of the team's remaining warm-up tests before the World Cup, which included a draw against South Africa, retention of the Bledisloe Cup, as well as a 92–7 win over Tonga, in which Read scored his 26th and final career try.

On 28 August, All Blacks Head Coach, Steve Hansen named Read as captain, amongst 31 players in New Zealand's squad for the 2019 Rugby World Cup. This was Read's third World Cup, also joined by Sam Whitelock and Sonny Bill Williams as one of three New Zealanders attending their third World Cup. After performing well in both pool stage tests he played in, Read lead New Zealand through to the quarter-finals, where they beat Ireland by 46–14.

Read was subsequently retained as Captain for the semi-final of the World Cup, against England. The test took place on 26 October, Read's 34th birthday. To Read's dismay, the All Blacks lost to England 7–19, meaning this was New Zealand's first Rugby World Cup loss since losing to France 20–18 in the 2007 Rugby World Cup quarter-final, before Read had even debuted for New Zealand. This also saw New Zealand lose their number-one ranking in World Rugby. "It's not what we came for", Read stated in response to the loss. Read would also later reveal he played in the semi-final despite a torn calf muscle.

New Zealand bounced back from losing to England, finishing the World Cup in third place, beating Wales by 40–17. Having previously signed to play for Toyota Verblitz in the Japanese Top League, prior to the World Cup, the Bronze Final was Read's last test for New Zealand. Read was one of five New Zealanders to retire from international rugby following the World Cup, with his Crusaders teammates, Ryan Crotty and Matt Todd, as well as Sonny Bill Williams and fellow former All Black Captain, Ben Smith retiring as well. Read finished his international career as the third-to-most capped All Black of all time, as well as the tenth overall. Read also finished having Captained the All Blacks the second-most ever, behind Richie McCaw. Read also led the prematch haka before the match.

=== List of international test tries ===
Try	Date	Venue	Opponent	Result	Competition
1	12 June 2010	Yarrow Stadium, New Plymouth, New Zealand	Ireland	66–28 (Won)	2010 mid-year internationals
2	10 July 2010	Eden Park, Auckland, New Zealand	South Africa	32–12 (Won)	2010 Tri Nations Series
3	11 September 2010	ANZ Stadium, Sydney, Australia	Australia	23–22 (Won)	2010 Tri Nations Series
4	6 November 2010	Twickenham Stadium, London, England	England	26–16 (Won)	2010 end-of-year rugby union internationals
5	20 November 2010	Aviva Stadium, Dublin, Ireland	Ireland	38–18 (Won)	2010 end-of-year internationals
6	20 September 2010	Aviva Stadium, Dublin, Ireland	Ireland	38–18 (Won)	2010 end-of-year internationals
7	9 October 2011	Eden Park, Auckland, New Zealand	Argentina	33–10 (Won)	2011 Rugby World Cup
8	17 November 2012	Stadio Olimpico, Rome, Italy	Italy	42–10 (Won)	2012 end-of-year rugby union internationals
9	1 December 2012	Twickenham Stadium, London, England	England	21–38 (Lost)	2012 mid-year internationals
10	14 September 2013	Eden Park, Auckland, New Zealand	South Africa	29–15 (Won)	2013 Rugby Championship
11	14 September 2013	Eden Park, Auckland, New Zealand	South Africa	29–15 (Won)	2013 Rugby Championship
12	5 October 2013	Ellis Park Stadium, Johannesburg, South Africa	South Africa	38–27 (Won)	2013 Rugby Championship
13	19 October 2013	Forsyth Barr Stadium, Dunedin, New Zealand	Australia	41–33 (Won)	2013 end-of-year internationals
14	16 November 2013	Twickenham Stadium, London, England	England	30–22 (Won)	2013 end-of-year internationals
15	23 August 2014	Eden Park, Auckland, New Zealand	Australia	51–20 (Won)	2014 Rugby Championship
16	22 November 2014	Millennium Stadium, Cardiff, Wales	Wales	34–16 (Won)	2014 end-of-year internationals
17	17 July 2015	AMI Stadium, Christchurch, New Zealand	Argentina	39–18 (Won)	2015 Rugby Championship
18	2 October 2015	Millennium Stadium, Cardiff, Wales	Georgia	43–10 (Won)	2015 Rugby World Cup
19	17 October 2015	Millennium Stadium, Cardiff, Wales	France	62–13 (Won)	2015 Rugby World Cup
20	11 June 2016	Eden Park, Auckland, New Zealand	Wales	39–21 (Won)	2016 mid-year internationals
21	30 September 2017	José Amalfitani Stadium, Buenos Aires, Argentina	Argentina	36–10 (Won)	2017 Rugby Championship
22	30 September 2017	José Amalfitani Stadium, Buenos Aires, Argentina	Argentina	36–10 (Won)	2017 Rugby Championship
23	8 September 2018	Trafalgar Park, Nelson, New Zealand	Argentina	46–24 (Won)	2018 Rugby Championship
24	27 October 2018	Nissan Stadium, Tokyo, Japan	Australia	37–20 (Won)	2018 end-of-year internationals

Updated: 5 December 2018 Source:

== Honours ==
=== Super Rugby ===
- Super Rugby Centurion
- Super Rugby Champion – 2008, 2017, 2018, 2019

=== Individual ===
- New Zealand Rugby Player of the Year
  - Winner: 2010, 2013
- World Rugby Player of the Year
  - Winner: 2013
- Test Rugby Centurion
- All Black Captain: 2013 – 2019
- 100 Test starts

In the 2020 Queen's Birthday Honours, Read was appointed an Officer of the New Zealand Order of Merit, for services to rugby.

=== International ===
- Rugby World Cup
  - Winners: 2011, 2015
  - Third Place: 2019
- Tri Nations/The Rugby Championship
  - Winners: 2010, 2012, 2013, 2014, 2016, 2017, 2018
  - Runners-up: 2015
- Bledisloe Cup
  - Winners: 2009, 2010, 2011, 2012, 2013, 2014, 2015, 2016, 2017, 2018, 2019
- Dave Gallaher Trophy
  - Winners: 2009, 2013 (2x), 2016, 2017
- Freedom Cup
  - Winners: 2012, 2013, 2014, 2015, 2016, 2017, 2018
- Hillary Shield
  - Winners: 2013, 2014 (2x), 2018
- British & Irish Lions series
  - Winners: 2017 (Drawn series – Shared title)
- World Rugby Team of the Year (New Zealand)
  - Winners: 2012, 2013, 2014, 2015, 2016, 2017
- Laureus Team of the Year (New Zealand)
  - Winners: 2016

Source: Source:
