= Piri Weepu =

NZ international rugby union player

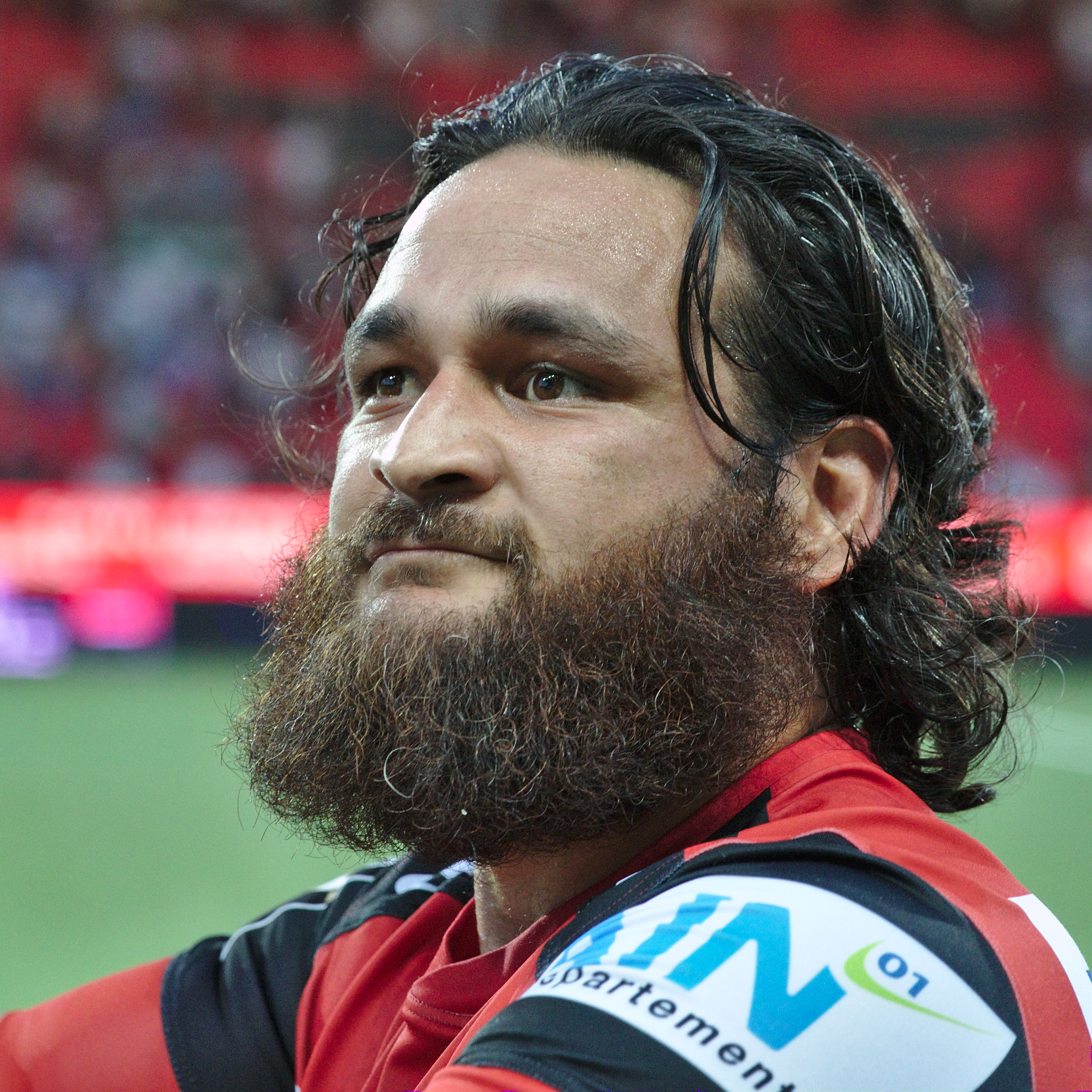
- Weepu post match for Oyonnax, August 2015
- Full name: Piri Awahou Tihou Weepu
- Born: 7 September 1983 (age 43) Lower Hutt, New Zealand
- Height: 178 cm (5 ft 10 in)
- Weight: 96 kg (212 lb; 15 st 2 lb)
- School: Te Aute College
- Notable relative: Billy Weepu (brother)

Rugby union career
- Position(s): Half-back, First five-eighth
Senior career
Years	Team	Apps	(Points)
2003–2011	Wellington	54	(254)
2004–2011	Hurricanes	84	(250)
2012–2014	Blues	40	(53)
2012–2013	Auckland	9	(27)
2014–2015	London Welsh	14	(0)
2015	Wasps	3	(0)
2015	Oyonnax	8	(5)
2016–2017	Narbonne	8	(0)
2017	Wairarapa Bush	8	(5)
- Correct as of 8 June 2019
International career
Years	Team	Apps	(Points)
2004	New Zealand U21	5	(0)
2004–2013	New Zealand	73	(110)
2005	Junior All Blacks	3	(0)
2005–2008	New Zealand Māori	7	(14)
- Correct as of 8 June 2019

Piri Awahou Tihou Weepu (born 7 September 1983) is a New Zealand retired rugby union player. Weepu played most recently for Wairarapa Bush in the Heartland Championship. Generally Weepu played as a half-back but also played at first five-eighth on occasion. He has represented the New Zealand national side, the All Blacks, between 2004 and 2013. He first won national honours against Wales in 2004. In 2005 was called back into the All Blacks squad for the first Tri Nations test against South Africa, having missed selection for the 2005 British & Irish Lions tour. He represented the Hurricanes and Blues in Super Rugby, and Wellington and Auckland in the Mitre 10 Cup. He also had brief spells with several clubs in Europe. In October 2017, Weepu announced his retirement as a rugby player.

== Early life ==
Of Māori descent, Weepu has tribal affiliations with Ngāi Tahu and Whakatōhea. He is also of Niuean descent. Weepu hails from Wainuiomata. He attended Te Aute College where he was head boy in 2001. After leaving school he played senior rugby with Hutt Old Boys Marist, under the tutelage of his mentor Derek Bruce, but returned to his roots and later joined Wainuiomata RFC with whom he remained affiliated throughout his professional career. His parents and Billy, however, all played for Wainuiomata Lions, the rugby league club.

== New Zealand career ==
=== Domestic career ===
During the 2006 Super 14 final, Weepu was knocked unconscious during an attempted tackle. However, due to the bizarrely thick fog during the match, the team doctors were unable to see that he had been unconscious. Weepu continued playing and went on to miss a tackle on Casey Laulala, conceding the match-winning try. Later Weepu admitted that he could not remember the game at all.

=== International career ===
Weepu was not selected for the 2007 Rugby World Cup squad, announced on 22 July 2007, with Crusaders halfback Andrew Ellis preferred.

During the 2011 Rugby World Cup Weepu played out of position in the last pool match against Canada, coming off the bench during the second half to play fullback as a replacement for Mils Muliaina. There was great pressure on the All Blacks to win the Cup, not having won it since 1987. This time round it looked to be New Zealand's year, but All Blacks playmaker Dan Carter was struck with a season-ending groin injury. This caused much media attention, and betting odds in favour of the All Blacks began to decrease. In the All Blacks vs Argentina quarter-final match, Weepu took on Carter's goal kicking duties. Landing seven penalties, with only a missed conversion, Weepu was named Man of the Match, helping guide New Zealand to victory, as well as earning him the nicknames "Mr Fixit" and "saviour". In the final against France he missed two penalties and a conversion; however, New Zealand emerged victorious due to a Tony Woodcock try and a Stephen Donald penalty.

Weepu was left out of the All Blacks squad for the June tests in 2013, being told he needed to work on his speed and defensive ability. He was named in the squad for the late autumn tour of Argentina, but received little playing time.

=== Leading of the haka ===
Weepu was an integral part of the All Blacks when it came to performing the haka before each game. Of the 71 tests he played in he was the haka leader in 51 of them (12 November 2005 – 22 June 2013); this is the most for any player since the introduction of Kapa o Pango in 2005 (tied with TJ Perenara for 51 in total). He led the Ka Mate version of the haka 26 times, and the newer Kapa o Pango haka 25 times.

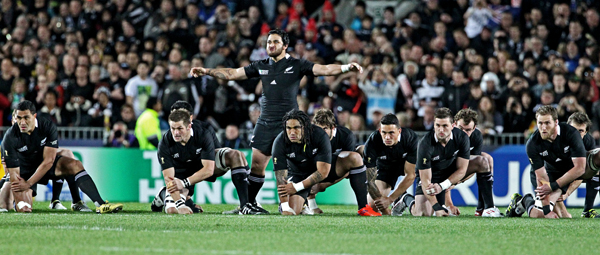
Piri Weepu leads the Kapa o Pango haka for the All Blacks

Weepu was the third All Black to lead "Kapa o Pango" in a game on 22 July 2006 against the Springboks.

== European career ==
=== England ===
Weepu signed to join London Welsh in July 2014 and left the Auckland Blues at the end of the 2014 Super Rugby season.

On 27 February 2015, it was announced Weepu had been released early from London Welsh and would join fellow Aviva Premiership side Wasps on a short-term deal until the end of the 2014–15 season.

=== France ===
On 23 February 2015, it was announced Weepu would be joining Top 14 side Oyonnax on a two-year deal from the 2015–16 season. On 15 January 2016 Oyonnax announced the termination of Weepu's contract with immediate effect, without giving any reason.

Instead, on 28 November 2016, Weepu signed with Pro D2 club RC Narbonne with immediate effect during the 2016–17 season.

== NRL speculation ==
In 2007 the Gold Coast Titans approached Weepu to play rugby league. Titans CEO Michael Searle said "He's a good player with plenty of experience at the top level in rugby union, and it would be good to get him back to rugby league if we can."

== TV career ==
Since 2018 Weepu has presented the Television documentary series Piri's Tiki Tour on Whakaata Māori and YouTube.

He has a cameo on the first episode of the Hawaiian period drama series Chief of War.

== Personal life ==
He is the brother of former rugby league professional Billy Weepu. He revealed in 2020 that he still resides in Wainuiomata, Lower Hutt, and that he suffered a stroke in 2014 while playing for London Welsh, where scans found blood clots in his Broca's area, which made him talk nonsensically like a baby for a while. He also suffered from weight issues, alcoholism, depression and self harm tendencies throughout his playing career, as well as sleep apnoea. He also has no cartilage in either of his knees.

== Match Fit ==
In 2020 and 2021/22, he completed two seasons of Match Fit. He started season one with a biometric age of 59 as a 37-year-old, was the only member who is petrified of heights in season 1, and he had a new son between the two seasons. He tried intermittent fasting, but it didn't work because he cut carbs completely out of his diet, although he also turned his diet rich in seafood-based protein as a presenter of an outdoor hunting and fishing show.

In 2024, he returned again for Match Fit: Union vs. League. He became unfit again, but his skills as a rugby player had sharpened. He scored the winning try against League players on a 3-on-3 sudden-death overtime. It later became apparent that being the only person based out of Auckland meant he also effectively trains by himself most of the time in his time in the series. He revealed that he is the coach of his eldest daughter's touch rugby, flag rugby and First XV teams with a netball team role pending, as well as managing his son's golf team.

Awards
Preceded by Daniel Braid	Tom French Memorial; Māori rugby union player of the year 2008; 2011	Succeeded by Zac Guildford
Preceded by Hosea Gear	Tom French Memorial; Māori rugby union player of the year 2008; 2011	Succeeded by Liam Messam
