= Adam Thomson (rugby union) =

New Zealand rugby union player

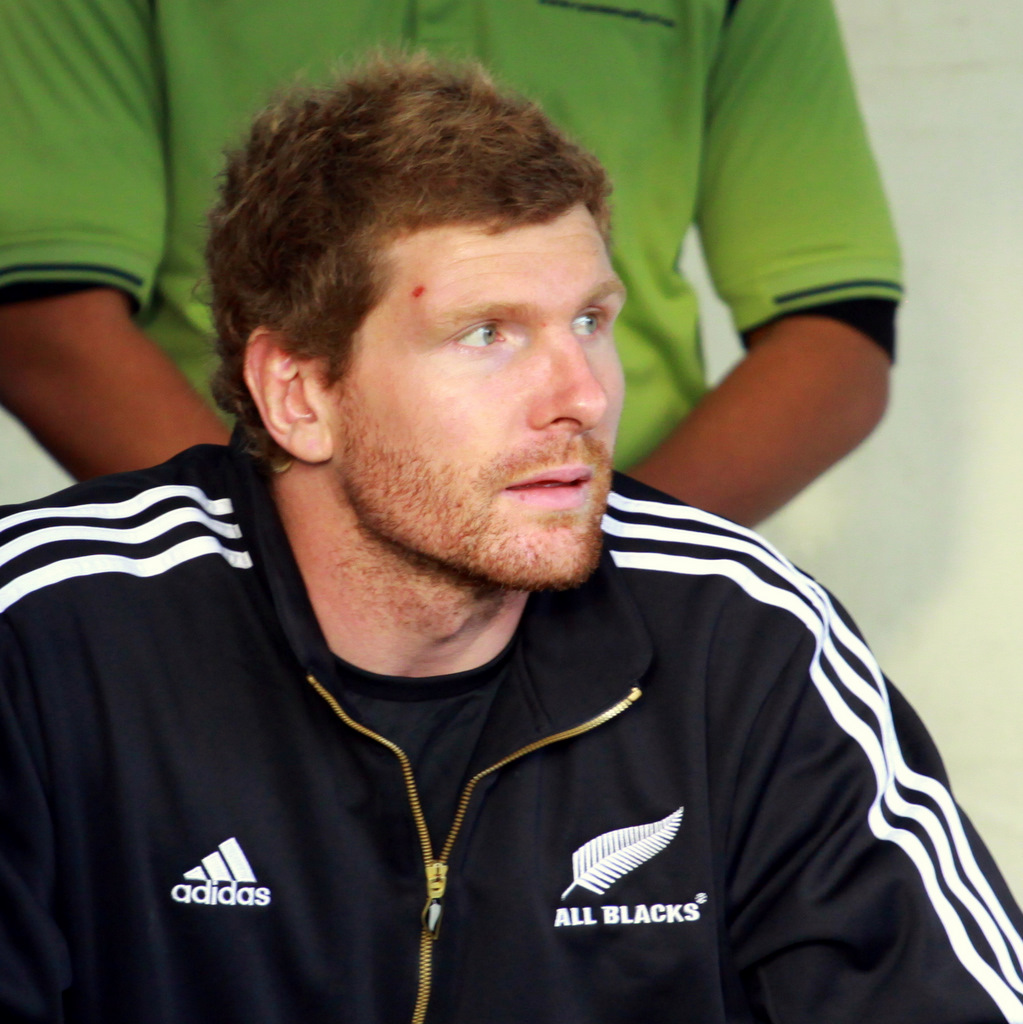
- Thomson visiting Christchurch during the Rugby World Cup, September 2011
- Full name: Adam John Thomson
- Born: 23 March 1982 (age 44) Ashburton, New Zealand
- Height: 196 cm (6 ft 5 in)
- Weight: 110 kg (243 lb; 17 st 5 lb)
- School: Christchurch Boys' High School

Rugby union career
- Position(s): Flanker, Number 8
- Current team: Waikato, Chiefs
Senior career
Years	Team	Apps	(Points)
2004–2012, 2019	Otago	62	(80)
2006–2012	Highlanders	67	(105)
2013–2017	Canon Eagles	46	(85)
2015	Reds	15	(0)
2016	Rebels	13	(5)
2017	NEC Green Rockets	10	(0)
2020	Chiefs	5	(0)
2020	Waikato	11	(10)
- Correct as of 26 July 2020
International career
Years	Team	Apps	(Points)
2003	New Zealand U21	5	(5)
2008–2012	New Zealand	31	(30)
2011–2015	Barbarian F.C.	5	(15)
- Correct as of 26 July 2020

Adam Thomson (born 23 March 1982) is a New Zealand rugby union player. He represented the New Zealand All Blacks between 2008 and 2012, playing a total of 29 tests including two during the victorious 2011 Rugby World Cup campaign. He played for the Melbourne Rebels in 2016, having also played Super Rugby with the Queensland Reds (2015) and Highlanders (2006–2012). He has also represented the Canon Eagles in Japan's Top League and New Zealand province Otago.

Thomson plays mainly as a blind-side flanker (number 6). He made his All Blacks debut against Ireland as a replacement for Rodney So'oialo on 7 June 2008, helped win the World Cup in 2011, and last played for the All Blacks against Scotland in November 2012.

== Early life and New Zealand representative teams ==
Thomson was born in Ashburton. He attended Christchurch Boys' High School, and played in the same 1st XV side as fellow All Black Dan Carter. Carter revealed on Instagram, that Thomson was the captain during his time in the school's 1st XV.

As he progressed through national rugby sides he played for:

- New Zealand Secondary Schools (2000)
- New Zealand Under 19 (2001)
- New Zealand Under 21 (2003)
- New Zealand Universities (2004)
- New Zealand Sevens (2007)

== Otago ==
Thomson made his debut for Otago on 17 September 2004 when he started against Waikato. Thomson played four matches (all losses) in 2004, starting in all of them. In 2005, he played in five matches, starting only once.

2006 saw Thomson move to number 8 where he played five matches, including try-scoring appearances in the 56–21 win over North Harbour, and against Southland. In 2007, Thomson moved back to flanker and started in all his nine matches, scoring three tries.

By the time he left New Zealand for the 2013 season, Thomson had played 50 games for Otago, scoring 13 tries (65 points).

Thomson returned to Otago on 17 August 2019, coming off the bench in the Ranfurly Shield defence against Southland. Otago won the match 41–22.

== 2006, 2008-12: Highlanders ==
Thomson played in three Super 14 matches for the Highlanders in 2006, all as a replacement. He was not selected for 2007, despite having a good season with Otago in the Air New Zealand Cup.

In 2008, Thomson was recalled. He began as a substitute, but played so well that midway through the season he'd become the team's top choice flanker. He played in twelve matches, scored five tries (including one in the victory over the Crusaders), and ultimately made the All Blacks squad that year.

Thomson remained at the Highlanders until he left New Zealand at the end of 2012. He finished as the Highlanders' second-highest try-scorer with 21, behind only Jeff Wilson (35). Thomson scored 6 tries in each of his last two seasons with the team, including a three-try match against the Rebels in 2012.

== 2008-12: All Blacks ==
Thomson was selected for the All Blacks in June 2008, making the squad ahead of Kieran Read, who was also waiting to debut in test rugby. The same squad contested the Iveco test series (against Ireland and England) and the 2008 Tri-Nations. Thomson debuted off the bench against Ireland when he replaced Rodney So'oialo. He then started in the second test against England.

In 2009, he started the international season at openside flanker, filling in for captain Richie McCaw, before breaking his thumb 30 minutes into the game. Thomson was side-lined for the better half of the season before making his comeback against Australia in the final Tri-Nations match, playing at blindside flanker. He was the fastest player over 40m in the All Blacks squad of 2009.

In 2010, he made the squad for the early-season Steinlager Series against Ireland and Wales, but not the Tri-Nations or end-of-year grand slam tour.

Thomson was a member of the victorious 2011 Rugby World Cup squad. He was an unused replacement as New Zealand beat France in the final.

In total, he played 29 tests (12 as a substitute) and scored 6 tries for New Zealand.

== 2013-14: Canon Eagles (Japan) ==
Thomson played for Tokyo's Canon Eagles for two years.

On 1 November 2014, Thomson played for the Barbarians, scoring a try against Australia at Twickenham stadium in London.

== 2015: Return to Super Rugby - Reds and Rebels (Australia) ==
In 2015, Thomson returned to Super Rugby with the Queensland Reds. He played 15 matches in the season, finishing as the team's top tackler and the competition's second-most prolific winner of opposition lineouts.

On 20 July 2015, Thomson announced that had signed with the Melbourne Rebels for 2016.

== 2016 return to Canon Eagles and illness ==
In 2016, Thomson resigned with Japan's Canon Eagles for the 2016–17 season. In late 2017, Thomson was hospitalised with a mystery illness, later found to be lumbar discitis. Thomson was in hospital for two months before being released.

== Personal life ==
He is known by supporters as the "wooly mammoth" due to his size and hair.

== Super Rugby statistics ==
As of 20 July 2016

Season	Team	Games	Starts	Sub	Mins	Tries	Cons	Pens	Drops	Points	Yel	Red
2006	Highlanders	3	0	3	26	0	0	0	0	0	0	0
2008	Highlanders	12	6	6	654	5	0	0	0	25	0	0
2009	Highlanders	13	13	0	1040	2	0	0	0	10	1	0
2010	Highlanders	12	12	0	960	2	0	0	0	10	0	0
2011	Highlanders	13	13	0	996	6	0	0	0	30	0	0
2012	Highlanders	15	15	0	1200	5	0	0	0	25	0	0
2015	Reds	15	15	0	1167	0	0	0	0	0	2	0
2016	Rebels	13	12	1	948	1	0	0	0	5	0	0
Total		96	86	10	6991	21	0	0	0	105	3	0
