= James Bolabiu =

Fijian rugby union referee (born 1983)

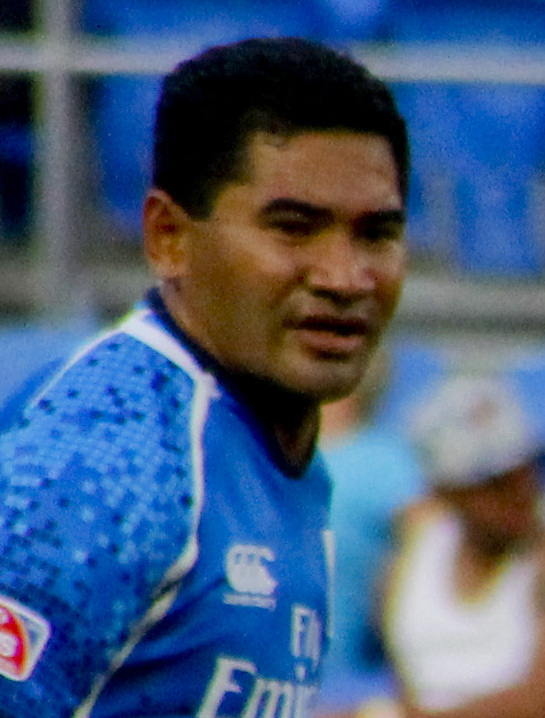
- Born: 25 May 1983 (age 43) (Fiji) Suva
- Height: 1.7 m (5 ft 7 in)
- Weight: 75 kg (165 lb)

Rugby union career
Refereeing career
Years	Competition	Apps
- Sevens World Series
- Pacific Nations Cup
2008	Junior Championship	

James Bolabiu (born 25 May 1983 in Suva, Fiji) is a Fijian international rugby union referee and Fiji's most experienced referee. He was an assistant referee at the 2008 Tri Nations Series matches between New Zealand and Australia in Sydney and Auckland. He also officiated at the 2008 IRB Junior World Championship held in Wales.

After officiating at the 2008 Tri Nations Series, Bolabiu had a two-month stint in South Africa in the Currie Cup First Division competition. He was the first Fijian referee to officiate at the IRB Sevens World Series. He also refs in the Pacific Nations Cup.

Bolabiu was selected as a match official for the 2016 Summer Olympics.
