= Schalk Burger =

South African rugby union player

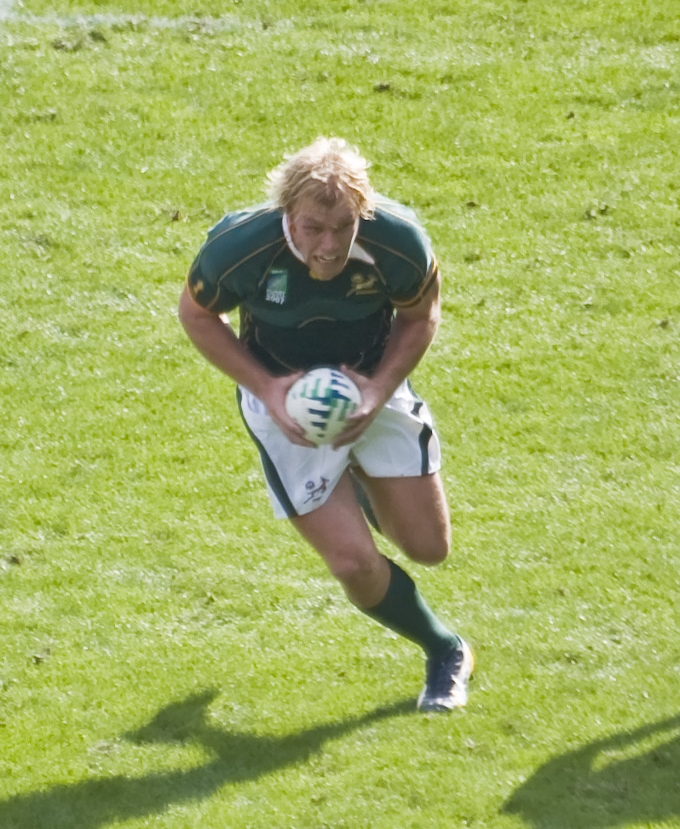
- Burger with South Africa in 2007
- Full name: Schalk Willem Petrus Burger Jr.
- Born: 13 April 1983 (age 43) Port Elizabeth, South Africa
- Height: 193 cm (6 ft 4 in)
- Weight: 114 kg (251 lb; 17 st 13 lb)
- School: Paarl Gimnasium
- University: Stellenbosch University
- Notable relative: Schalk Burger (father)
- Occupation: Rugby player

Rugby union career
- Position: Loose-forward
- Current team: Saracens
Youth career
- 2002: Western Province
Senior career
Years	Team	Apps	(Points)
2003–2014	Western Province	37	(35)
2004–2016	Stormers	123	(45)
2014–2016	Suntory Sungoliath	17	(25)
2016–2019	Saracens	52	(20)
International career
Years	Team	Apps	(Points)
2003	South Africa U21	8	(20)
2003–2015	South Africa	86	(80)
2014–2015	Springbok XV	2	(0)
Medal record
Men's Rugby union
Representing South Africa
Rugby World Cup
Gold medal – first place	2007 France	Squad
Bronze medal – third place	2015 England	Squad

Schalk Willem Petrus Burger Jr. (born 13 April 1983) is a South African former professional rugby union player. He played as a flanker for Saracens in the English Premiership and won 86 caps for South Africa.

He was a member of the 2007 Rugby World Cup-winning team, was twice named South African Rugby Player of the Year (in 2004 and 2011), and was named IRB Player of the Year in 2004, among other accolades. He also holds the record for the third most appearances (84) (behind Siya Kolisi and Pieter-Steph du Toit) and third most tries scored (13) by a Springbok flanker. However, Burger's physical approach also resulted in him being shown a yellow card six times in international rugby, second only to Italy's Marco Bortolami (7 times) as of June 2014. Burger also suffered injuries, especially to his neck and knee, which sidelined him for considerable periods at a time. He also played four times for the Barbarians.

== Early life ==
Burger is one of a handful of second-generation Springboks. His father, also called Schalk Burger, was an international lock, being capped for South Africa during the "isolation years" of the 1980s. Burger attended high school at Paarl Gimnasium, along with future teammate and Springbok captain Jean de Villiers, and enjoyed success in many sports. Burger attended Stellenbosch University and stayed in Eendrag Men's Residence before leaving in order to pursue a full-time rugby career.

== Rugby career ==
After playing for the Under 21 Springbok side that won the U21 Rugby World Cup in 2002 and then captaining it in 2003, Burger was selected for the senior Springbok squad. He made his debut against Georgia in 2003 at the Rugby World Cup and carved out a name as one of the best flankers in the world with solid performances in the Super 12, Tri-Nations and Currie Cup.

=== 2004 ===
In 2004, Burger was selected as part of a rejuvenated Springbok squad which, under the guiding hand of new coach Jake White, went on to win the Tri-Nations trophy for the first time since Nick Mallett's team managed the feat in 1998.

To conclude the 2004 season, Burger received the IRB International Player of the Year award, as well as the ABSA SA Rugby Player of the Year award.

=== 2006 ===
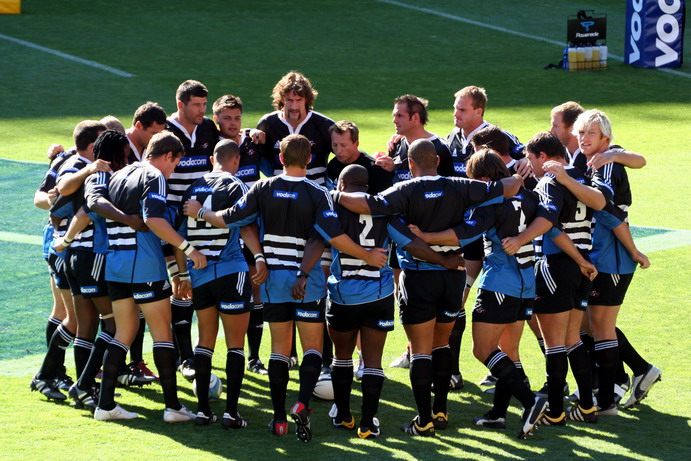
The Stormers during 2006.

After an indifferent 2006 Super 14 season, during which Burger showed only flashes of the brilliance that took him to the peak of world rugby, he was to once again start in his favoured number 6 shirt (openside flanker in South African rugby) in the national team for the upcoming expanded Tri-Nations test series against Australia and New Zealand. However, in the Springboks' Test match against Scotland on 17 June, Burger suffered a serious neck injury. The following day, it was confirmed that he would require cervical fusion surgery and would be out of action for at least the remainder of 2006. The injury and the required surgery were serious enough for White to tell the media, "I don't want to jump to conclusions – but there is a chance he may never play again." Burger's father told a Cape Town radio program that the injury was between his sixth and seventh cervical vertebrae, adding, "Although the operation is difficult the fact that the injury is lower down his neck is good for a future prognosis of making a full recovery." The South African Rugby Union released a statement on 24 June, the date of the surgery, indicating that the surgery was successful and that Burger would undergo six to eight months of rehabilitation, with plans to return him to the game.

=== 2007 – Rugby World Cup Champion ===
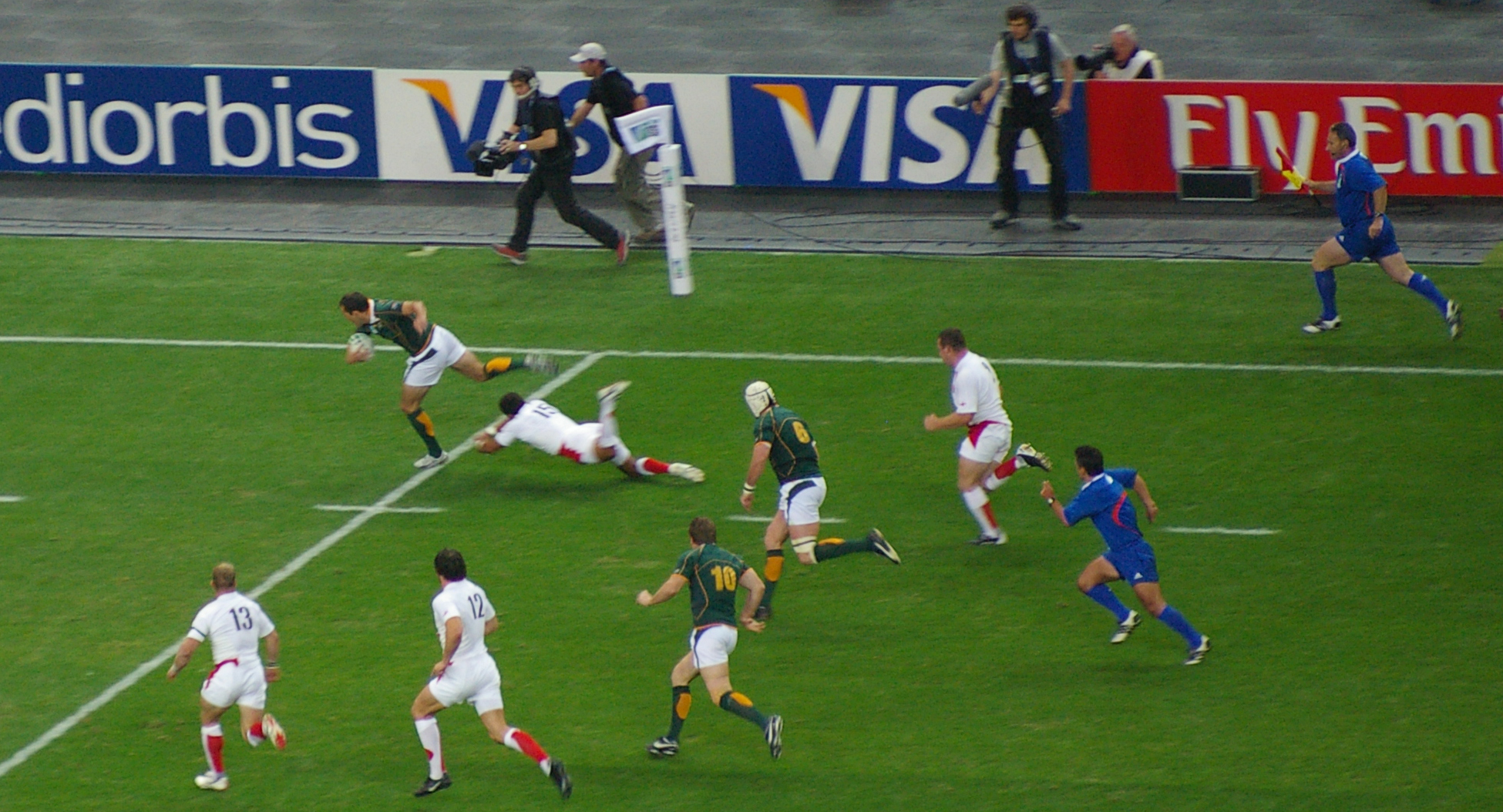
England playing South Africa in the 2007 World Cup.

Following successful surgery and rehabilitation, Burger returned to the Vodacom Stormers line-up on 13 January 2007, playing 55 minutes as the Stormers lost to the Bulls. Despite the loss, Burger did show flashes of the brilliance that took him to the peak of world rugby in 2004–05. After a shaky start to the 2007 Super 14 season, Burger inspired the Stormers to their first win of the campaign against the Chiefs as the Stormers recorded their first points of the season in a tense 21–16 victory at the Newlands Stadium.

In mid-2007 he was picked in the Springboks squad for the 2007 Rugby World Cup. He was linked with a move to Harlequins of the English Premiership after the cup.

During the Springboks' first match of the Rugby World Cup against Samoa, Burger was cited for a high tackle on Junior Polu, and on 11 September was given a four-match suspension which would have in theory kept him out of the team until the semi-final. However, this was reduced to a two-match suspension on appeal.

Burger would return to play a key role in South Africa's World Cup triumph as the Springboks defeated England 15–6 to lift the Webb Ellis trophy for the second time in four attempts.

=== 2008 ===
In March 2008, Burger was banned for openly abusing a touch judge in a Super 14 game for the Stormers against the Sharks in Durban. The touch judge in question had suggested the referee send Burger to the sin-bin for an offense that the referee hadn't seen. Upon leaving the field, Burger was seen to be gesticulating and shouting at the touch judge. The citing commissioner decided that Burger be banned for two weeks for his actions. After another great season which saw the Stormers finish just short of making the play-offs, Burger was selected by new coach Peter de Villiers for the Springboks' 2008 Tri Nations campaign.

=== 2009 ===
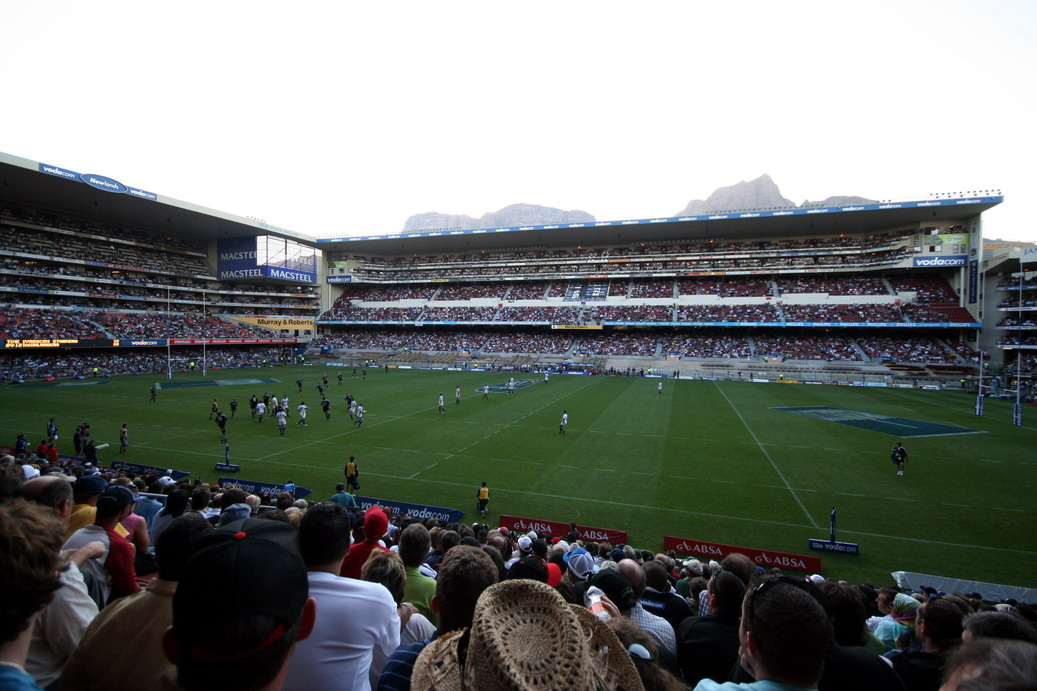
A Stormers match at Newlands.

Burger was selected for the Springboks' to play the British & Irish Lions, not having played since injuring his calf muscle in April while playing for the Stormers.

During the opening minute of the second British & Irish Lions test at Loftus Versfeld, Pretoria, Burger made contact with the eyes of Lions winger Luke Fitzgerald. The incident was seen by touch judge Bryce Lawrence who reported it to match referee Christophe Berdos, who awarded a yellow card. Burger was subsequently cited by the commissioning officer for "making contact with the eye area" and then handed an eight-week ban. A later investigation by judicial officer Alan Hudson concluded that contact with the face was made but there was no intention to gouge Fitzgerald's eyes, but that Burger acted "contrary to good sportsmanship by making contact with the face in the eye area." Burger responded by saying "...I only have the utmost respect for the traditions of the wonderful game of rugby. Through my life and career I have always approached the game with the intention only of playing it hard and fair. I am not a rugby thug and will never intentionally engage in eye gouging or similar illegal actions."

=== 2010 ===
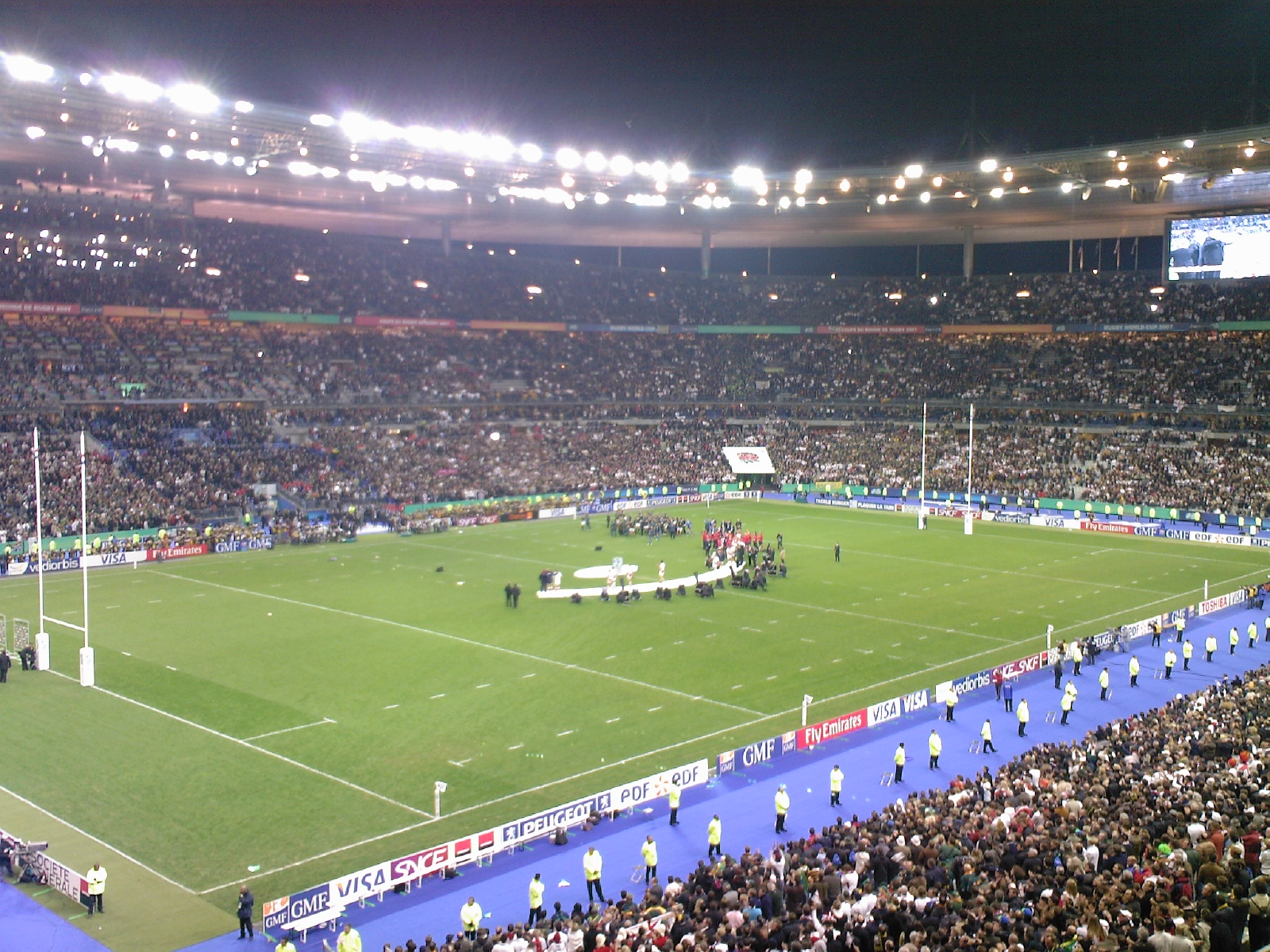
2007 World Cup Final

Burger was selected for the 2010 Tri Nations series as part of the South African squad to play six matches. The first game was against New Zealand on 10 July 2010 in Auckland. He started that match at blindside Flanker. South Africa lost that match 32–12. But in the second game against New Zealand which South Africa lost 31–17 Burger scored a try. He scored his second and final try of the tournament against New Zealand.
During the 2010 Currie Cup final, which Western Province lost to the Sharks 30–10, Burger suffered a broken rib. However, he was not substituted during the match, and also scored Western Province's only try. Scans after the game revealed the injury, which would force Burger to miss the 2010 end-of-year rugby union tests against the Home Unions.

=== 2011 – Rugby World Cup ===
Burger was selected for the 2011 Rugby World Cup. He played the first game against Wales which South Africa won 17–16. He played all the matches in group D. South Africa were knocked out however in the Quarter Finals against Australia. He was ruled out of South Africa's Summer tour of England with injury. In November at the end-of-year awards ceremony in Johannesburg, Burger was named the SARU's Player of the Year for the second time, becoming the fifth Springbok to win the award more than once.

=== 2012–13 ===
Over the following two seasons, Burger struggled with injury and illness.
During preparations for the 2013 Super Rugby season, Burger pulled up during a running exercise after experiencing spasms in his left calf. A back scan revealed a cyst next to his spinal cord impacting the nerve which influenced the calf muscle's performance, and he underwent an operation to drain the cyst and relieve pressure on the nerve. It was thought at the time that Burger would miss at least the first three weeks of the season.
However, severe complications followed. During the initial operation, Burger contracted a hospital bug, which resulted in bacterial meningitis. At one stage during the isolation period, Burger's condition became so serious that there were genuine fears for his life. After his situation had improved, he then had to endure a series of operations to remove the cyst completely. In total, Burger would spend six weeks in hospital and a further eight weeks recovering indoors. Burger resumed training at the end of July, but was reluctant to set a definite return date:

To give a timeline is quite difficult... I certainly don't want to over-commit. The good news is that I can start to train properly and get the heart-rate up. That, in itself, is exciting news and I look forward to increasing my training schedule over the next few weeks with the help of the strength and conditioning team at WP Rugby. We will then reassess things again in a month's time.

Burger finally returned to action in late September, coming off the bench for the final 20 minutes of the Currie Cup match between Western Province and Free State Cheetahs in Bloemfontein. Although it was not a spectacular comeback, he emerged unscathed as Western Province came from behind to win 29–27. It was Burger's first competitive appearance since injuring his knee 18 months earlier.

=== 2014 ===
On 24 May, during the Stormers' 33–0 win over the Cheetahs, Burger suffered a neck injury. The injury was not serious, but he failed to recover in time for the following match against the Sharks in Durban. On 2 June, it was announced that Burger had signed a two-year contract with Japanese Top League side Suntory Sungoliath. As part of his contract, he would still be available to play for the Stormers and the national side, but would not feature during the 2014 Currie Cup. For the 2014 June test series against Wales and Scotland, Springbok coach Heyneke Meyer named Burger and Victor Matfield in the squad of 36 players. Both had not played for South Africa since the 2011 World Cup.

=== 2015 – Rugby World Cup Bronze Medalist ===
Due to his success in returning to the Springboks after recovering from spinal meningitis, he was awarded the Comeback of the Year Award at the Laureus World Sports Awards. He joined the list of Super Rugby centurions during their Round 7 match against the Highlanders in Dunedin, starting the match which ended in a 21–39 defeat for the Stormers. Selected as part of the Springbok squad at the 2015 Rugby World Cup, Schalk started in all seven matches, the majority as openside flanker, with a sole appearance as number eight in their Pool B match against Japan. The Springboks reached the semi-finals, bowing out to eventual champions New Zealand (18–20), before clinching the Bronze Final against Argentina (24–13). Burger scored tries against Samoa and Scotland in the pool stages, and assisted Fourie du Preez's try in their victory against Wales (23–19) in the Quarter Finals. Schalk finished the tournament as the player with the equal second most RWC tournament participations (4), equal third most RWC matches won (16), as well as being the player with the equal second highest number of RWC matches contested (20), bested solely by Jason Leonard and Richie McCaw (22). Burger was also drawn into 2015 RWC sponsors Société Générale's dream team, taking the position of openside flanker. Dismissing any notion of continuing to play for the Springboks in 2016 and beyond, Burger had suggested the commencement of his international retirement after the 2015 RWC Bronze Final.

=== 2016 – Saracens ===
Burger signed a two-year deal to join English Premiership side Saracens prior to the 2016–2017 season. He helped Saracens win the European Champions Cup in 2017 and 2019, featuring in both finals. In December 2018 Burger announced that he would be leaving Saracens at the end of the 2018-2019 season to return to Cape Town.

== International statistics ==
=== Test tries ===
Tries	Opposition	Location	Venue	Competition	Date	Result
1	Georgia	Sydney, Australia	Sydney Football Stadium	2003 Rugby World Cup	24 October 2003	Won 46–19
1	Wales	Pretoria, South Africa	Loftus Versfeld	Test match	24 June 2004	Won 53–18
1	Scotland	Durban, South Africa	Kings Park Stadium	Test match	10 June 2006	Won 36–16
1	England	Bloemfontein, South Africa	Free State Stadium	Test match	26 May 2007	Won 58–10
1	England	Pretoria, South Africa	Loftus Versfeld	Test match	2 June 2007	Won 55–22
1	New Zealand	Durban, South Africa	Kings Park Stadium	2007 Tri Nations Series	23 June 2007	Lost 21–26
3	Namibia	Cape Town, South Africa	Newlands	Test match	15 August 2007	Won 105–13
1	United States	Montpellier, France	Stade de la Mosson	2007 Rugby World Cup	30 September 2007	Won 64–15
1	Ireland	Dublin, Ireland	Croke Park	Test match	28 November 2009	Lost 10–15
1	New Zealand	Wellington, New Zealand	Westpac Stadium	2010 Tri Nations Series	17 July 2010	Lost 17–31
1	New Zealand	Johannesburg, South Africa	FNB Stadium	2010 Tri Nations Series	21 August 2010	Lost 22–29
1	England	London, United Kingdom	Twickenham Stadium	Test match	15 November 2014	Won 31–28
1	Samoa	Birmingham, United Kingdom	Villa Park	2015 Rugby World Cup	26 September 2015	Won 46–6
1	Scotland	Newcastle, United Kingdom	St James' Park	2015 Rugby World Cup	3 October 2015	Won 34–16

== Personal life ==
Burger is the eldest child of Schalk Burger Snr and his wife Myra. He has two younger siblings – brother Tiaan and sister René, who in 2008 gained international attention for speaking out after she was gang-raped. When not playing rugby, Burger lives and works with his family on the Welbedacht Wine Estate near Wellington, Western Cape.

After dating for six years, Burger was engaged to Michele de Munck, an interior designer from Cape Town. They married at the Welbedacht Estate on 3 December 2011. The couple had their first child, Schalk Jr, in August 2012, and their second son Nicol was born in March 2014.

Rugby Union Captain
Preceded by Jean de Villiers	South Africa national rugby union team captain	Next: Fourie du Preez
