= Richard Brown (rugby union) =

Australian rugby union footballer

- Born: Richard Brown; 28 August 1984 (age 42) Julia Creek, Queensland, Australia
- Height: 1.89 m (6 ft 2 1/2 in)
- Weight: 108 kg (17 st 0 lb; 238 lb)
- School: St. Josephs Nudgee College

Rugby union career
- Position: Flanker
- Current team: Cottesloe
Senior career
Years	Team	Apps	(Points)
2007	Perth Spirit	9	(10)
2013–	Honda Heat	0	(0)
Super Rugby
Years	Team	Apps	(Points)
2006–13	Western Force	89	(25)
- Correct as of 15 July 2013
International career
Years	Team	Apps	(Points)
2008–	Australia	23	(5)
2008	Australia A		
2003–04	Australia U-21		
2001	Australia Schoolboys		
National sevens team
Years	Team		Comps
2003–04	Australia Sevens		

Richard Brown (born 28 August 1984) is an Australian rugby union footballer.

== Career ==
He is one of six players to have represented the Western Force in all of its Super 14 games in 2007, and one of 14 Force players selected in the Wallabies train-on squad in May 2008. In 2009 Brown became Australia national rugby union team's first choice number 8. In 2000 he played in the first XV at St. Josephs Nudgee College in Brisbane, captained by Rocky Elsom. Brown was in Year 11 with Hugh McMeniman and Rocky Elsom was in Year 12.

In 2002, Brown played in the University of Queensland Undefeated Colts 1 Premiership team. This team also included other future professional players such as Stephen Moore, Heath Tessman, Hugh McMeniman, Mitchell Chapman, Tim Usasz, Josh Graham and Drew Mitchell.
