= Ricky Januarie =

South African rugby union player

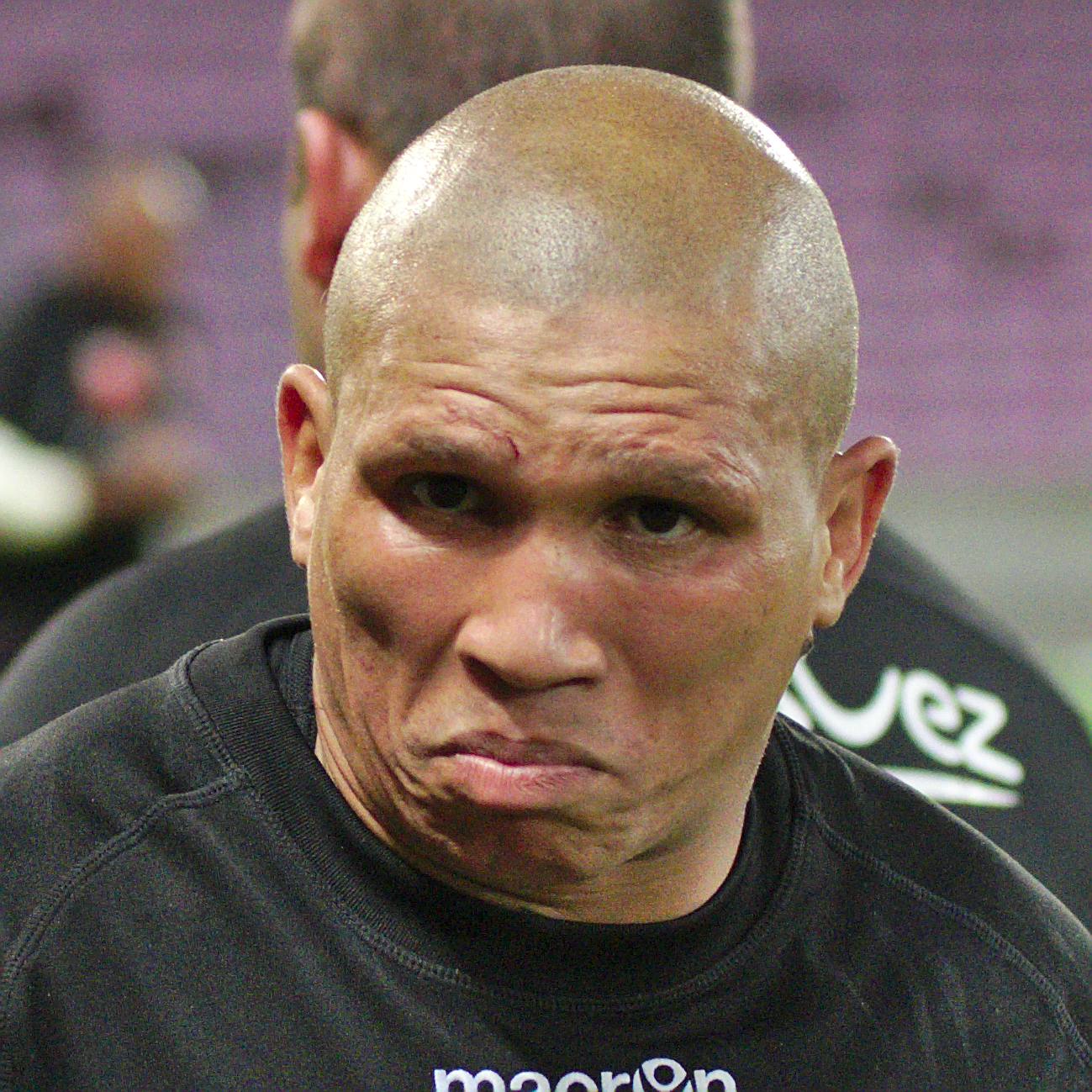
- Born: Enrico Ricardo Januarie; 2 January 1982 (age 44) Hopefield, South Africa
- Height: 1.68 m (5 ft 6 in)
- Weight: 95 kg (209 lb)
- School: Weston Senior Secondary

Rugby union career
- Position: Scrum-half
Provincial / State sides
Years	Team	Apps	(Points)
1999-2001	Louwville	17	(45)
2002	Boland Cavaliers	2	(0)
2003–2007	Golden Lions	8	(20)
2008–2011	Western Province	11	(15)
2009–2010	Ospreys (loan)	2	(5)
2011–2015	Lyon OU	79	(40)
2015–2017	La Rochelle	53	(15)
2017–2019	Agen	112	(55)
- Correct as of 30 March 2022
Super Rugby
Years	Team	Apps	(Points)
2003–2006	Cats	43	(10)
2007	Lions	12	(0)
2008–2011	Stormers	54	(20)
- Correct as of 11 December 2019
International career
Years	Team	Apps	(Points)
1999–2000	South Africa Amateurs	4	(0)
2005–2010	South Africa	47	(25)
- Correct as of 22 November 2012

Enrico Ricardo "Ricky" Januarie (born 2 January 1982) is a former South African professional rugby union player. He played for SU Agen Lot-et-Garonne of the Rugby Pro D2 second-level division in France. He has also been a member of the South Africa national rugby union team, having won the 2007 Rugby World Cup.

== Career ==
Januarie was one of the top players of his high school team, Weston High School, in Vredenburg, South Africa. He is known for scoring the match-winning try against New Zealand in a 2008 Tri Nations Series match that the Springboks had won 30–28. In November 2009, whilst a member of the South African Western Province rugby team, Januarie joined the Welsh regional team Ospreys on a three-month loan arrangement, with questions of him potentially being an ineligible player due to pre-season obligations with Western Province and the 2010 Currie Cup pre-season matches having been solved. In 2011, he left South Africa and joined Lyon OU in France and spent four years with the team. Januarie then signed on with La Rochelle for two years. In June 2017, he signed with Agen and has been an active player on the team since then.
