= Mils Muliaina =

New Zealand international rugby union player

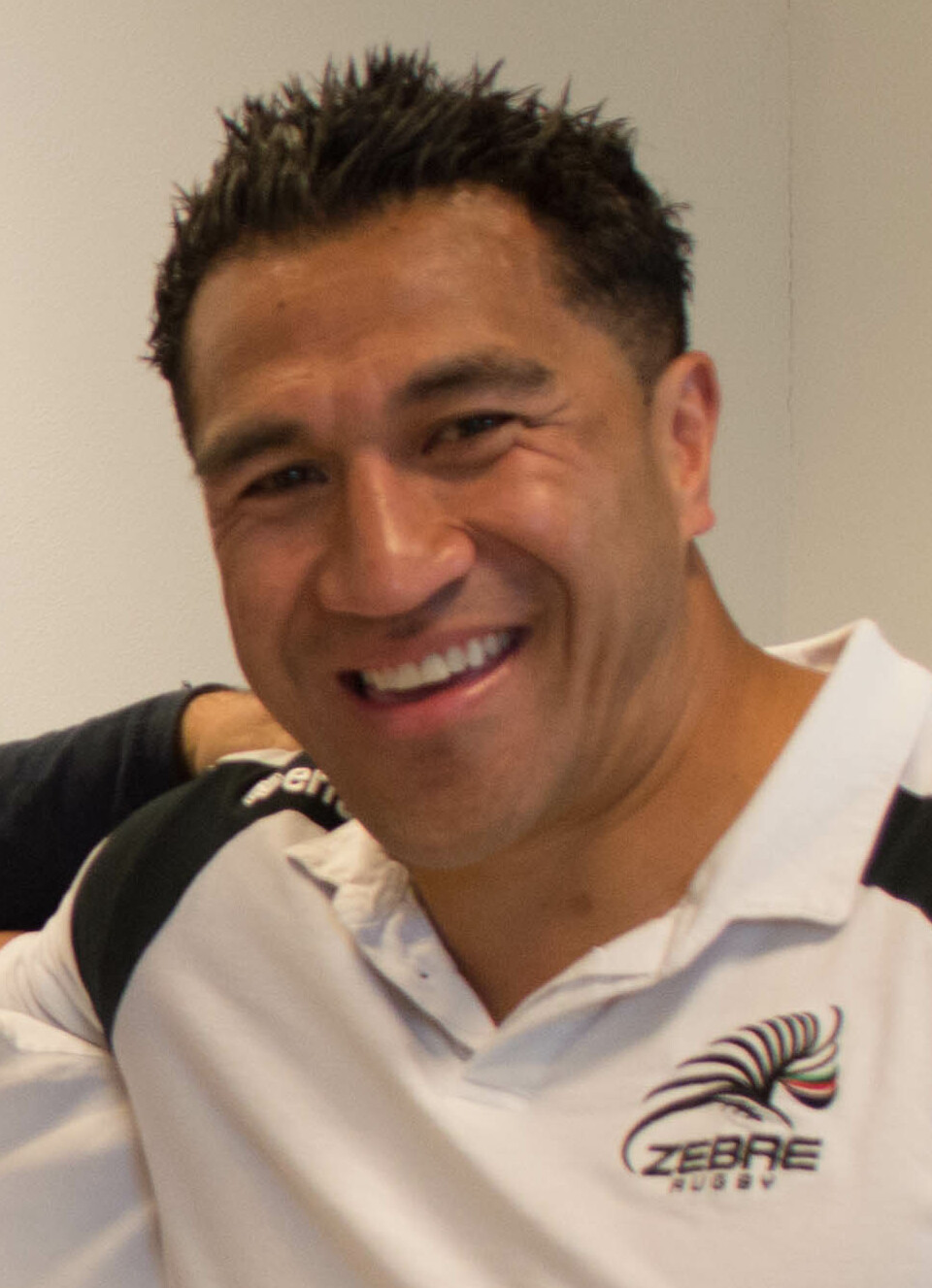
- Muliaina in 2016
- Born: Junior Malili Muliaina; 31 July 1980 (age 46) Salelesi, Samoa
- Height: 183 cm (6 ft 0 in)
- Weight: 93 kg (14 st 9 lb; 205 lb)
- School: Cargill High School; Southland Boys' High School; Kelston Boys' High School

Rugby union career
- Position(s): Fullback, Wing
Senior career
Years	Team	Apps	(Points)
1999–2005	Auckland	42	(65)
2001–2005	Blues	49	(82)
2006–2011	Chiefs	55	(65)
2006–2010	Waikato	7	(10)
2011–2013	NTT DoCoMo	19	(20)
2014	Chiefs	6	(5)
2014–2015	Connacht	11	(0)
2015	Zebre	10	(5)
2016	San Francisco Rush	5	(10)
- Correct as of 18 February 2016
International career
Years	Team	Apps	(Points)
2000	New Zealand A	2	(5)
2000–2001	New Zealand Colts	5	(15)
2003–2011	New Zealand	100	(165)
- Correct as of 9 October 2011
National sevens team
Years	Team		Comps
1999–2002	New Zealand		11
Medal record
Men's rugby sevens
Representing New Zealand
Commonwealth Games
Gold medal – first place	2002 Manchester	Team competition

Junior Malili "Mils" Muliaina (born 31 July 1980) is a former professional rugby union player who most recently played for San Francisco Rush in the US PRO Rugby competition. He played primarily as a fullback, though he has also played as a centre and on the wing.

Born in Salelesi, Samoa, Muliaina moved with his family to Invercargill, New Zealand, at the age of three. At international level Muliaina played for New Zealand from 2003 until his retirement after the 2011 Rugby World Cup. Muliaina became only the second All Black to reach 100 caps during the World Cup quarter-final against Argentina in 2011. He scored 33 tries for New Zealand and remains among the top 40 highest try scorers in rugby union.

== Early career ==
He first attended Cargill High School then Southland Boys' High School, where he proved proficient enough at rugby to be offered a scholarship to Kelston Boys' High School in Auckland, in 1998. Subsequently, Muliaina played for the NZ Secondary Schools XV, the team winning that year's world championship. He repeated this the following year with the Under 19 side, and in 2000 and 2001 was part of the world champion Under 21 (NZ Colt) teams of those years.

== Super Rugby and the All Blacks ==
Muliaina joined the Auckland Blues in 2001 and was a part of the Super 12 title-winning team for the Blues in 2003. Muliaina's test debut for the All Blacks was against England on 14 June 2003 at the Westpac Stadium in Wellington. He was subsequently part of the All Black squad at the 2003 Rugby World Cup. In 2004, he was the only player to be selected for every test played by the All Blacks. Muliaina has also played in 11 tournaments for the sevens team, including winning a Commonwealth Games gold medal in 2002 in Manchester. Though he has expressed a preference for playing as an outside centre, Muliaina generally plays at fullback. In 2006 he joined the Chiefs, with whom he brought up his 100th Super Rugby cap in 2011.

On 9 October 2011 during the 2011 Rugby World Cup, Muliaina played his 100th game for the All Blacks after starting at fullback against Argentina. During the game, Muliaina was forced from the field at half-time, having injured his shoulder. This was later revealed to have been fractured, meaning he was dropped from the New Zealand World Cup squad. Muliaina retired from the All Blacks squad the following day on 10 October 2011 after achieving his 100th Test cap and returned on 23 October 2011 to claim his gold medal after the All Blacks won the 2011 Rugby World Cup final.

== Europe ==
As of 4 May 2014, Mils had signed a one-year contract for Irish provincial region Connacht in the Pro12. On 21 November 2014, Muliaina made his Connacht debut in a 43–3 win over Italian side Zebre at the Sportgrounds.

In July 2015, Muliaina was charged with sexual assault following an incident with a woman in a Cardiff night club. The charge was dropped in October 2015 due to it being a case of mistaken identity.

== United States ==
It was announced in March 2016 that Muliaina would play the upcoming season in the United States in the newly formed PRO Rugby competition. He joined the San Francisco Rush midway through the inaugural 2016 season.

== Personal life ==
Mulianina's nephew, Mika Muliaina, has played for the New Zealand national under-20 rugby union team, and has been named in the Highlanders squad for 2027.

== Achievements ==
- Rugby World Cup Sevens Champion (2001)
- Under 21 Rugby World Champion (2000 & 2001)
- Commonwealth Games Gold Medal, Sevens Rugby (2002)
- IRB Sevens World Series Champion (1999, 2000 & 2001)
- ITM Cup (also known as the National Provincial Championship, NPC) Champion (Auckland: 1999, 2002, 2005; Waikato: 2006)
- Super Rugby Champion (2003 with Blues)
- NZ Super Rugby Player of the Year (2009)
- 106 Super Rugby caps (Blues and Chiefs)
- Tri-Nations Champion (2003, 2005, 2006, 2007, 2008 & 2010)
- British & Irish Lions series victory (2005)
- Grand Slam (2005, 2008 & 2010)
- IRB Player of the Year Nominee (2010)
- Rugby World Cup Champion (2011)
- 100 All Black Test caps (3 as captain)
