= Gurthrö Steenkamp =

South African rugby union player

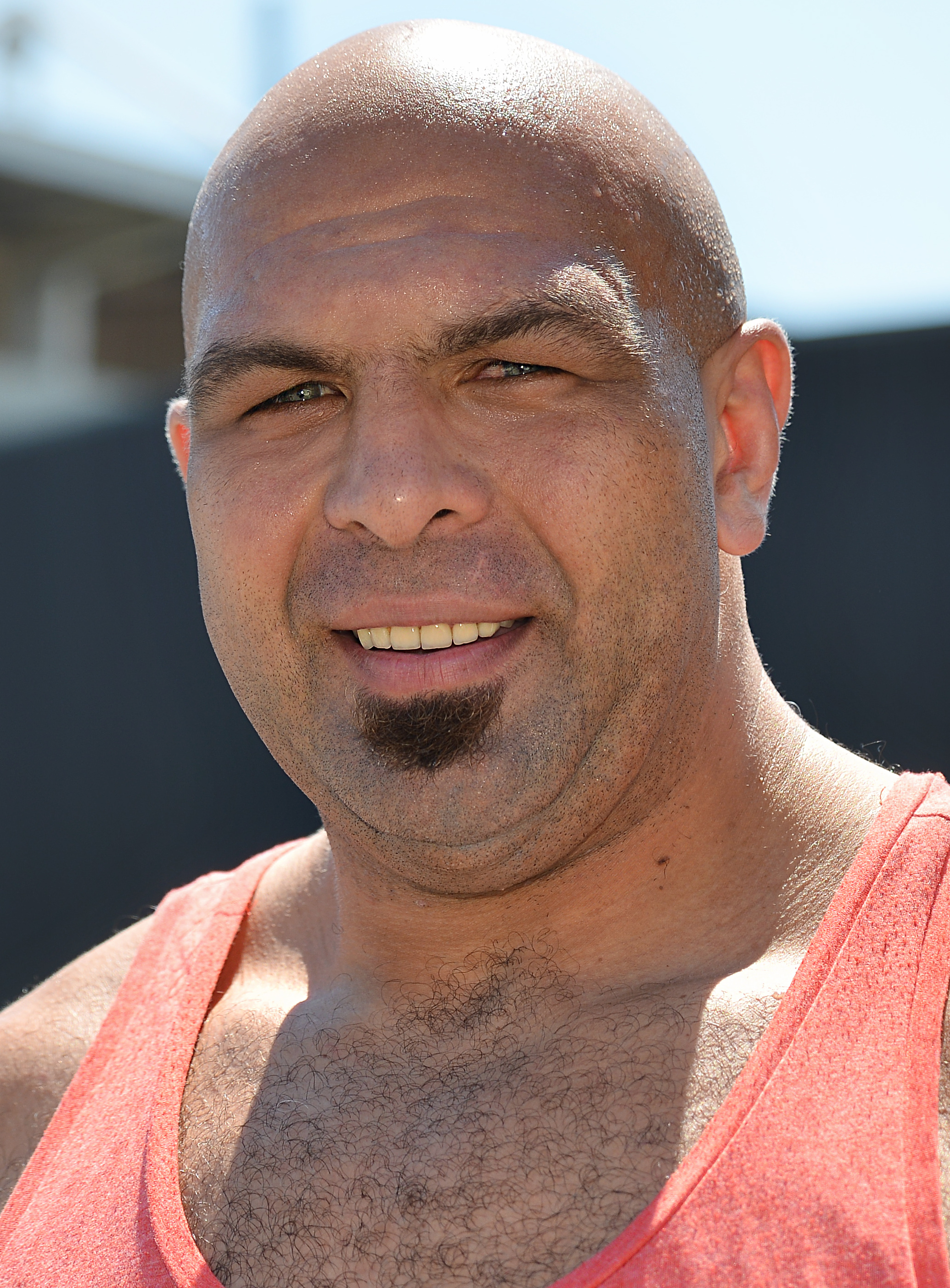
- Born: Gurthrö Garth Steenkamp; 12 June 1981 (age 45) Paarl, South Africa
- Height: 1.89 m (6 ft 2 1/2 in)
- Weight: 122 kg (269 lb; 19 st 3 lb)
- School: Paarl Boys' High School
- University: University of the Free State

Rugby union career
- Position: Loosehead Prop
Senior career
Years	Team	Apps	(Points)
2011–2017	Toulouse	128	(5)
2017–2018	Stade Français	10	(0)
- Correct as of 2 February 2018
Provincial / State sides
Years	Team	Apps	(Points)
2002–2004	Free State Cheetahs	23	(10)
2005–2012	Blue Bulls	21	(25)
- Correct as of 18 November 2012
Super Rugby
Years	Team	Apps	(Points)
2004	Cats	9	(5)
2005–2010	Bulls	60	(5)
- Correct as of 18 November 2012
International career
Years	Team	Apps	(Points)
2004–2014	South Africa	53	(30)
- Correct as of 23 November 2014
Medal record
Men's Rugby union
Representing South Africa
Rugby World Cup
Gold medal – first place	2007 France	Squad

Gurthrö Garth Steenkamp (born 12 June 1981 in Paarl) is a South African former rugby union player. He played loosehead prop for the Free State Cheetahs (Currie Cup) the Bulls and the Cats (Super 14). He made his debut for the Springboks in late 2004 against Scotland.

During the 2005 Tri Nations he seemed to have cemented his place in the Springboks with a strong performance against the Wallabies at Ellis Park. A broken hand at the end of the tournament stalled his career for the Springboks. Over the next couple of years he battled with injuries until making a successful return to Super Rugby and the Springboks in 2007. He was selected to represent South Africa at the 2007 Rugby World Cup. He also won the 2010 South African player of the year. He also played all five matches for South Africa at the 2011 Rugby World Cup.

== Honours ==
South Africa Under-21

- U-21 World Cup: 2002

Blue Bulls

- Currie Cup: 2009

Bulls

- Super Rugby: 2007, 2009, 2010

South Africa

- World Cup: 2007

Toulouse

- French Champions: 2012
