= Anthony Boric =

NZ international rugby union player

- Full name: Anthony Frank Boric
- Born: 27 December 1983 (age 42) Auckland, New Zealand
- Height: 200 cm (6 ft 7 in)
- Weight: 113 kg (249 lb; 17 st 11 lb)
- School: Rosmini College

Rugby union career
- Position(s): Lock, Flanker
Senior career
Years	Team	Apps	(Points)
2005–2011	North Harbour	58	(15)
2006–2013	Blues	73	(15)
- Correct as of 28 May 2020
International career
Years	Team	Apps	(Points)
2006	Junior All Blacks	3	(0)
2008–2011	New Zealand	25	(15)
- Correct as of 28 May 2020

Anthony Frank Boric (born 27 December 1983 in Auckland) is a former rugby union footballer who represented the New Zealand in international rugby, and was a member of the 2011 Rugby World Cup winning All Blacks squad. He played as a lock.

== Early and personal life ==
Boric is a second-generation New Zealander of Croatian descent. His grandfather, from whom Boric acquired his middle name, hailed from the Dalmatia region. He attended school at Rosmini College in Takapuna where he played first XV rugby.

Boric then studied civil engineering at the University of Auckland, and in 2008, the final year of his degree, received news of his inclusion in the All Black squad when he heard his name read out on the radio.

== Rugby career ==
Boric started playing rugby on the wing, but as he grew rapidly in his teenage years he switched into the second row, and also played as a loose forward. In his early days at North Harbour and the Blues, Boric alternated between the role of lock and blindside flank before deciding to concentrate on the former position.

After making his first appearance as an All Black coming on as a substitute against England on 13 June 2008, Boric's first match as part of the starting line-up was against the Springboks in Dunedin, replacing the suspended Brad Thorn.

Boric scored his first Test try versus Scotland on 8 November 2008

Boric played his last Test match for the All Black side during the winning 2011 Rugby World Cup campaign. He played 4 matches during the tournament, all of which were from the reserve bench.
