= Tony Woodcock (rugby union) =

NZ international rugby union player

Tony Woodcock MNZM
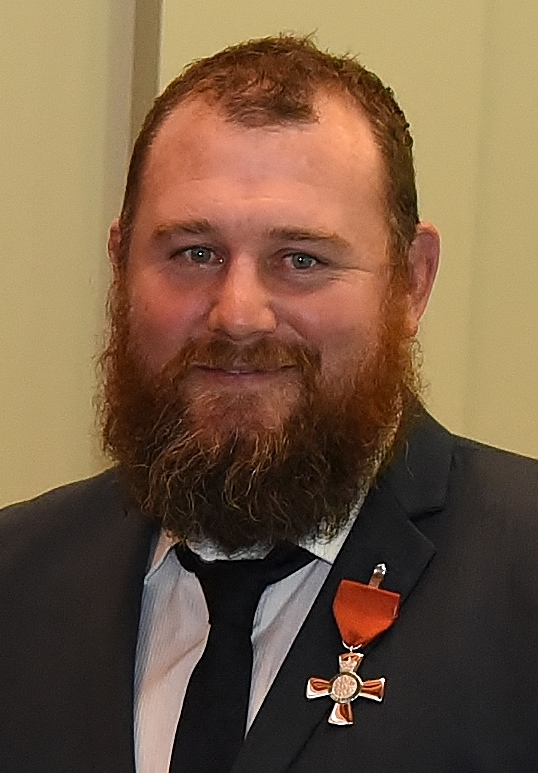
- Born: Tony Dale Woodcock; 27 January 1981 (age 45) Helensville, New Zealand
- Height: 1.84 m (6 ft 0 in)
- Weight: 120 kg (265 lb)
- School: Kaipara College

Rugby union career
- Position: Loosehead prop
Provincial / State sides
Years	Team	Apps	(Points)
2000–2015	North Harbour	54	(10)
- Correct as of 2 August 2011
Super Rugby
Years	Team	Apps	(Points)
2002–2015	Blues	137	(45)
2013	Highlanders	12	(5)
International career
Years	Team	Apps	(Points)
2002–2015	New Zealand	118	(50)

Tony Dale Woodcock MNZM (born 27 January 1981) is a New Zealand former rugby union player. His position was loosehead prop, and he played 118 tests for the New Zealand national team, the All Blacks. Woodcock played for the All Blacks from 2002 to 2015, scoring eight test tries. He was described by The Dominion Post as "widely regarded as the world's premier loosehead", and by The New Zealand Herald as having the "best range of skills of any prop on the planet". He is now the most capped All Black prop of all time, and is the second most capped player in Blues history, behind Keven Mealamu. He was a key member of the 2011 and 2015 Rugby World Cup winning squads, becoming one of only 20 players to have won multiple Rugby World Cups.

== Club rugby ==
He played for Blues in Super Rugby, and for North Harbour in the ITM Cup (when available).

After 113 appearances for the Blues, he joined the Highlanders for the 2013 Super Rugby season. However about a year later, after spending a year with the Highlanders who came 2nd to last in Super Rugby, Woodcock decided to return to the Blues where he would be closer to his family. He signed a 1-year contract. Woodcock has a reputation for playing as much rugby as possible. In 2005 he played in the first eleven of the twelve All Black test matches that year. From 2001 to 2004, he played in every match for North Harbour, except for the first two matches of 2004 due to being on All Black duty, and in 2002 and 2003, he played the full eighty minutes of every game for North Harbour. In 2006, he requested and received permission from the All Black coaching staff to return a week early from his enforced rest due to All Black duty, to play in North Harbour's Ranfurly Shield challenge against Canterbury, a match that North Harbour won 21–17, making them the Ranfurly Shield holders for the first time.

Woodcock is a Life Member of North Harbour Rugby

== All Blacks ==
Woodcock made his international debut for New Zealand on 23 November 2002 when he started against Wales at the Millennium Stadium in Cardiff. Woodcock was one of six debutants that day and started alongside Blues teammates Keven Mealamu and Daniel Braid, the former of whom would go on to become a long-serving front-row partner to Woodcock. Woodcock played the full 80 minutes, something rare for a prop and the All Blacks beat Wales 43–17.

Woodcock did not play for the All Blacks again until 2004, a year when he started three times. Woodcock became a regular starter for New Zealand in 2005, starting in all three tests against the touring British and Irish Lions team, with the All Blacks failing to lose in all of those tests. Woodcock started in 10 of his 11 international appearances in 2005, and made 10 appearances for the All Blacks in 2006.

He was the first All Black prop to score a test try against Australia in 20 years, when he scored the first try of his international career on 30 June 2007 against Australia in a 15–20 loss and another try against Australia the following week, when the All Blacks won 26–12. After his performances through the year, Woodcock was selected for the 2007 Rugby World Cup. Woodcock made started in four of his three appearances in the competition, the most notable being when he played the full 80 minutes of New Zealand's shock 18–20 loss to France in the quarter-final of the World Cup, eliminating them for the competition.

Woodcock was retained in the All Blacks in 2008 and on 2 August 2008, he became the first All Black prop to score two tries in a match (a rare feat for a prop against any side) against Australia in over 50 years. He had a heavy workload for the All Blacks in 2008, playing 12 tests for them that year.

Woodcock celebrated his 50th test to kick off his 2009 international rugby season, but it was unfortunately spoiled by losing 22–27 on the occasion, against France in Dunedin.

He scored New Zealand's only try in the 2011 Rugby World Cup final against France, becoming the first All Black prop to score a try in a Rugby World Cup final, and only the second prop ever to do so.

He received his 100th cap for the All Blacks in a test match in Wellington against Australia on 24 August 2013. Woodcock was not subbed off, with replacement prop Wyatt Crockett instead replacing Sam Whitelock in the 27–15 win over Australia.

Woodcock was named in the 31-man squad for the 2015 Rugby World Cup, where he scored a try in a 47–9 victory against Tonga in the final pool match of the competition on 9 October. His 118 test-match career in rugby union unfortunately ended in the same match, when he was injured and replaced by Wyatt Crockett in the 43rd minute. Joe Moody was subsequently flown over to England from New Zealand, in order to replace Woodcock, who remained in the country and collected his winners' medal following New Zealand's 34–17 victory in the final against Australia's Wallabies.

In the 2016 New Year Honours, Woodcock was appointed a Member of the New Zealand Order of Merit for services to rugby.

=== International tries ===
Try	Opposing team	Location	Venue	Competition	Date	Result
1	Australia	Melbourne, Australia,	Melbourne Cricket Ground,	2007 Tri Nations Series	30 June 2007	Lost
2	Australia	Auckland, New Zealand	Eden Park	2007 Tri Nations Series	21 July 2007	Won
3	Australia	Auckland, New Zealand	Eden Park	2008 Tri Nations Series	2 August 2008	Won
4	Australia	Auckland, New Zealand	Eden Park	2008 Tri Nations Series	2 August 2008	Won
5	Australia	Brisbane, Australia	Lang Park	2008 Tri Nations Series	13 September 2008	Won
6	South Africa	Auckland, New Zealand	Eden Park	2010 Tri Nations Series	10 July 2010	Won
7	South Africa	Johannesburg, South Africa	Soccer City	2010 Tri Nations Series	21 August 2010	Won
8	France	Auckland, New Zealand	Eden Park	2011 Rugby World Cup	23 October 2011	Won
9	Wales	Cardiff, Wales	Millennium Stadium	2012 End of Year Tour	25 November 2012	Won
10	Tonga	Newcastle, England	St James' Park	2015 Rugby World Cup	9 October 2015	Won

== Other activities ==
Outside rugby, Woodcock has a deer farm near Kaukapakapa.
