= 2005 Tri Nations Series =

Final positions
- Champions: New Zealand (6th title)
- Bledisloe Cup: New Zealand

Tournament statistics
- Matches played: 6
- Tries scored: 26 (4.33 per match)
- Attendance: 303,056 (50,509 per match)
- Top scorer(s): (South Africa) Percy Montgomery (52)
- Most tries: (South Africa) Bryan Habana (3) (New Zealand) Doug Howlett (3) (New Zealand) Joe Rokocoko (3)

The 2005 Tri Nations Series, an annual rugby union competition between the national teams of Australia, New Zealand and South Africa, was the tenth in the series. The competition is organised by SANZAR, a consortium of the three countries' rugby federations. This was the last year in which the Tri Nations was contested in its original double round-robin format, with each team playing the others twice.

New Zealand claimed the title with a 31–27 win over South Africa in the penultimate week of the competition; New Zealand's final opponents, Australia, were already unable to catch them and the result put New Zealand above South Africa with the Springboks having played all their matches. The All Blacks also retained the Bledisloe Cup with victory over Australia in both fixtures. The Mandela Challenge Plate between Australia and South Africa was contested outside the Tri Nations.

== Synopsis ==
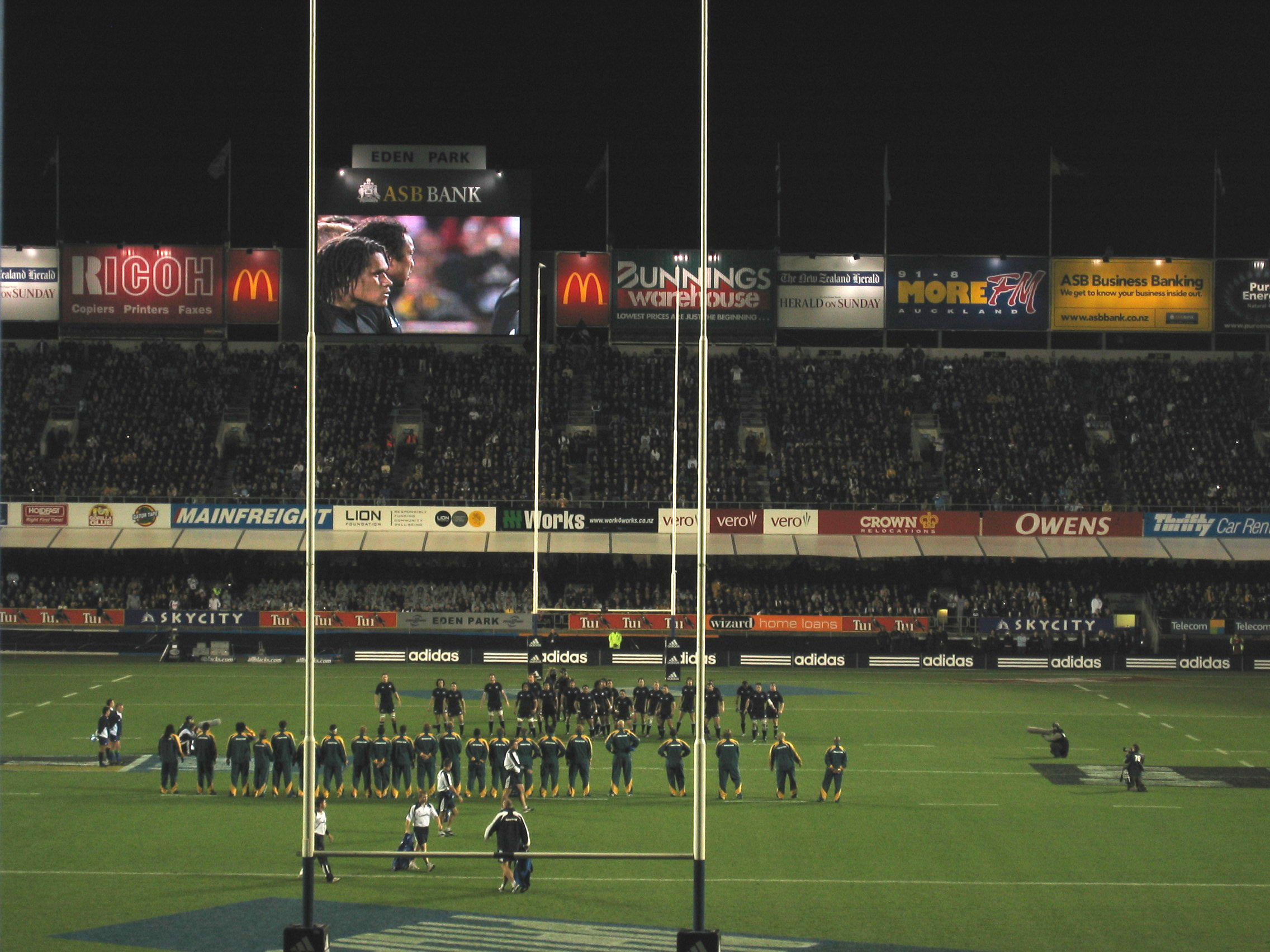
Final game of the 2005 Tri Nations Series, All Blacks vs Wallabies, Eden Park

The All Blacks were clear favourites going in, having come off a sweep of the British & Irish Lions. The Springboks entered with many questions, most dealing with the player selections made by coach Jake White. Many in South Africa questioned White's selections after a loss to Australia in the first leg of the Mandela Plate. However, the Springboks won the second leg to retain the Mandela Plate. The Wallabies entered with promise, but had been hurt by the loss of talismanic fly-half Stephen Larkham to a shoulder injury before the series.

The series began with the South Africa leg. In the opener, the Springboks came from behind to defeat the Wallabies at Loftus Versfeld. The 22–16 margin gave the Wallabies the consolation of a bonus point. The following week at Newlands, the Boks handed the All Blacks what would prove to be their only loss in 2005 by the identical score.

When the series moved to Australia, the All Blacks ensured themselves of retaining the Bledisloe Cup by a comprehensive 30–13 win over the Wallabies. However, they failed to earn a bonus point. The Springboks kept pace with the All Blacks by nipping Australia the following week 22–19.

The series decider proved to be the first match of the New Zealand leg, pitting the All Blacks and Springboks. In a closely fought match, a late try by Keven Mealamu gave the All Blacks both the win and a key bonus point. They would secure the trophy the next week with a bonus-point win over the Wallabies.

== The aftermath ==
=== New Zealand ===
The All Blacks emerged from the Tri Nations as clearly the best team in the world in 2005. They had enough depth to shrug off what would have been a devastating loss to most other national teams—an injury to arguably their best player, fly-half Dan Carter during the win in Sydney, that kept him out of the tests at home against the Springboks and the Wallabies. The All Blacks would punctuate their season with a "Grand Slam" over all four Home Nations on their November tour of the United Kingdom and Ireland. Carter would come back for the Grand Slam tour, and was selected as 2005 World Player of the Year by the International Rugby Board.

=== South Africa ===
As for the Springboks, they showed themselves to be a close second to the All Blacks, silencing White's critics in the process. For the second straight year, the Tri Nations was the international coming-out party for a young Springboks star. In 2004, Schalk Burger, Jean de Villiers and Marius Joubert emerged as major stars, with Burger going on to be named the IRB World Player of the Year. This year, Bryan Habana established himself as one of the world's most dangerous wings, and was named a finalist for World Player of the Year.

=== Australia ===
The Wallabies fought bravely throughout the series, but were ultimately outmanned. The competition exposed major weaknesses in their front row. They would spiral downward to their longest Test losing streak since 1969, which would cost head coach Eddie Jones his job.

== Format ==
As in past competitions, points were earned on the following schedule:

- 4 points for a win
- 2 points for a draw
- 0 points for a loss
- 1 bonus point for scoring 4 tries or more, win or lose
- 1 bonus point for a loss by 7 points or less

== Table ==
Nation	Games				Points			Bonus points	Table points
Nation	Played	Won	Drawn	Lost	For	Against	Difference	Bonus points	Table points
New Zealand	4	3	0	1	111	86	+25	3	15
South Africa	4	3	0	1	93	82	+11	1	13
Australia	4	0	0	4	72	108	−36	3	3

== Results ==
=== Round 1 ===
30 July 2005
15:00 SAST (UTC+02)

South Africa	22–16	Australia (1 BP)
Try: Paulse; Con: Montgomery; Pen: Montgomery (3); Drop: Montgomery; Pretorius		Try: Smith; Con: Giteau; Pen: Giteau (3)

Loftus Versfeld Stadium, Pretoria
Attendance: 53,056
Referee: Paul Honiss (New Zealand)

FB	15	Percy Montgomery
RW	14	Breyton Paulse
OC	13	Jaque Fourie
IC	12	Jean de Villiers
LW	11	Bryan Habana
FH	10	André Pretorius
SH	9	Fourie du Preez
N8	8	Jacques Cronjé
BF	7	Juan Smith
OF	6	Joe van Niekerk
RL	5	Victor Matfield
LL	4	Bakkies Botha
TP	3	CJ van der Linde
HK	2	John Smit (c)
LP	1	Gurthrö Steenkamp
Replacements:
HK	16	Gary Botha
PR	17	Lawrence Sephaka
LK	18	Albert van den Berg
FL	19	Schalk Burger
SH	20	Ricky Januarie
CE	21	Wayne Julies
FB	22	Jaco van der Westhuyzen
Coach:
Jake White

FB	15	Chris Latham
RW	14	Wendell Sailor
OC	13	Morgan Turinui
IC	12	Matt Giteau
LW	11	Lote Tuqiri
FH	10	Stephen Larkham
SH	9	George Gregan (c)
N8	8	David Lyons
OF	7	George Smith
BF	6	John Roe
RL	5	Nathan Sharpe
LL	4	Daniel Vickerman
TP	3	Matt Dunning
HK	2	Jeremy Paul
LP	1	Bill Young
Replacements:
HK	16	Stephen Moore
PR	17	Al Baxter
LK	18	Mark Chisholm
FL	19	Phil Waugh
SH	20	Chris Whitaker
CE	21	Stirling Mortlock
FB	22	Drew Mitchell
Coach:
(Australia) Eddie Jones

=== Round 2 ===
6 August 2005
15:00 SAST (UTC+02)

South Africa	22–16	New Zealand (1 BP)
Try: De Villiers; Con: Montgomery; Pen: Montgomery (4); Drop: Pretorius		Try: Gear; Con: Carter; Pen: Carter (3)

Newlands Stadium, Cape Town
Attendance: 49,118
Referee: Andrew Cole (Australia)

FB	15	Percy Montgomery
RW	14	Breyton Paulse
OC	13	Jaque Fourie
IC	12	Jean de Villiers
LW	11	Bryan Habana
FH	10	André Pretorius
SH	9	Ricky Januarie
N8	8	Joe van Niekerk
BF	7	Juan Smith
OF	6	Schalk Burger
RL	5	Victor Matfield
LL	4	Bakkies Botha
TP	3	CJ van der Linde
HK	2	John Smit (c)
LP	1	Os du Randt
Replacements:
HK	16	Hanyani Shimange
PR	17	Gurthrö Steenkamp
LK	18	Albert van den Berg
N8	19	Jacques Cronjé
SH	20	Fourie du Preez
CE	21	Wayne Julies
FB	22	Jaco van der Westhuyzen
Coach:
Jake White

FB	15	Leon MacDonald
RW	14	Rico Gear
OC	13	Tana Umaga (c)
IC	12	Aaron Mauger
LW	11	Mils Muliaina
FH	10	Dan Carter
SH	9	Byron Kelleher
N8	8	Rodney So'oialo
OF	7	Richie McCaw
BF	6	Jerry Collins
RL	5	Ali Williams
LL	4	Chris Jack
TP	3	Carl Hayman
HK	2	Keven Mealamu
LP	1	Tony Woodcock
Replacements:
HK	16	Derren Witcombe
PR	17	Greg Somerville
LK	18	James Ryan
FL	19	Marty Holah
SH	20	Piri Weepu
FH	21	Luke McAlister
WG	22	Joe Rokocoko
Coach:
(New Zealand) Graham Henry

=== Round 3 ===
13 August 2005
20:00 AEST (UTC+10)

Australia	13–30	New Zealand
Try: Mitchell; Con: Giteau; Pen: Giteau (2)		Try: McCaw; Rokocoko; Weepu; Con: Carter (2); McAlister; Pen: Carter (3)

Stadium Australia, Sydney
Attendance: 83,000
Referee: Tony Spreadbury (England)

FB	15	Drew Mitchell
RW	14	Mark Gerrard
OC	13	Stirling Mortlock
IC	12	Morgan Turinui
LW	11	Lote Tuqiri
FH	10	Matt Giteau
SH	9	George Gregan (c)
N8	8	David Lyons
OF	7	George Smith
BF	6	John Roe
RL	5	Nathan Sharpe
LL	4	Daniel Vickerman
TP	3	Al Baxter
HK	2	Jeremy Paul
LP	1	Bill Young
Replacements:
HK	16	Brendan Cannon
PR	17	Matt Dunning
LK	18	Mark Chisholm
FL	19	Phil Waugh
SH	20	Chris Whitaker
FH	21	Elton Flatley
CE	22	Clyde Rathbone
Coach:
Eddie Jones

FB	15	Mils Muliaina
RW	14	Rico Gear
OC	13	Tana Umaga (c)
IC	12	Aaron Mauger
LW	11	Joe Rokocoko
FH	10	Dan Carter
SH	9	Piri Weepu
N8	8	Rodney So'oialo
OF	7	Richie McCaw
BF	6	Jerry Collins
RL	5	Ali Williams
LL	4	Chris Jack
TP	3	Carl Hayman
HK	2	Keven Mealamu
LP	1	Tony Woodcock
Replacements:
HK	16	Derren Witcombe
PR	17	Greg Somerville
LK	18	James Ryan
FL	19	Marty Holah
SH	20	Kevin Senio
FH	21	Luke McAlister
FB	22	Leon MacDonald
Coach:
(New Zealand) Graham Henry

=== Round 4 ===
20 August 2005
18:00 AWST (UTC+08)

(1 BP) Australia	19–22	South Africa
Try: Rathbone; Con: Rogers; Pen: Rogers (3); Giteau		Try: Habana (2); Pen: Montgomery (3); Drop: Montgomery

Subiaco Oval, Perth
Attendance: 43,278
Referee: Alain Rolland (Ireland)

FB	15	Drew Mitchell
RW	14	Mat Rogers
OC	13	Clyde Rathbone
IC	12	Morgan Turinui
LW	11	Lote Tuqiri
FH	10	Matt Giteau
SH	9	George Gregan (c)
N8	8	David Lyons
OF	7	Phil Waugh
BF	6	Rocky Elsom
RL	5	Nathan Sharpe
LL	4	Daniel Vickerman
TP	3	Al Baxter
HK	2	Brendan Cannon
LP	1	Bill Young
Replacements:
HK	16	Stephen Moore
PR	17	Matt Dunning
LK	18	Mark Chisholm
N8	19	John Roe
FL	20	George Smith
SH	21	Chris Whitaker
WG	22	Adam Ashley-Cooper
Coach:
Eddie Jones

FB	15	Percy Montgomery
RW	14	Breyton Paulse
OC	13	Jaque Fourie
IC	12	Jean de Villiers
LW	11	Bryan Habana
FH	10	André Pretorius
SH	9	Ricky Januarie
N8	8	Joe van Niekerk
BF	7	Juan Smith
OF	6	Schalk Burger
RL	5	Victor Matfield
LL	4	Bakkies Botha
TP	3	CJ van der Linde
HK	2	John Smit (c)
LP	1	Os du Randt
Replacements:
HK	16	Hanyani Shimange
PR	17	Gurthrö Steenkamp
LK	18	Albert van den Berg
N8	19	Jacques Cronjé
SH	20	Fourie du Preez
CE	21	Wayne Julies
FB	22	Jaco van der Westhuyzen
Coach:
Jake White

=== Round 5 ===
27 August 2005
19:35 NZST (UTC+12)

(1 BP) New Zealand	31–27	South Africa (1 BP)
Try: MacDonald; Mealamu; Rokocoko (2); Con: MacDonald (3); McAlister; Pen: Leon MacDonald		Try: Fourie; Habana; Januarie; Con: Montgomery (3); Pen: Montgomery (2)

Carisbrook, Dunedin
Attendance: 29,500
Referee: Joël Jutge (France)

FB	15	Mils Muliaina
RW	14	Rico Gear
OC	13	Tana Umaga (c)
IC	12	Aaron Mauger
LW	11	Joe Rokocoko
FH	10	Leon MacDonald
SH	9	Piri Weepu
N8	8	Rodney So'oialo
OF	7	Richie McCaw
BF	6	Jerry Collins
RL	5	Ali Williams
LL	4	Chris Jack
TP	3	Carl Hayman
HK	2	Keven Mealamu
LP	1	Tony Woodcock
Replacements:
HK	16	Derren Witcombe
PR	17	Greg Somerville
LK	18	James Ryan
FL	19	Sione Lauaki
SH	20	Kevin Senio
FH	21	Luke McAlister
FB	22	Doug Howlett
Coach:
(New Zealand) Graham Henry

FB	15	Percy Montgomery
RW	14	Jean de Villiers
OC	13	Jaque Fourie
IC	12	De Wet Barry
LW	11	Bryan Habana
FH	10	André Pretorius
SH	9	Ricky Januarie
N8	8	Joe van Niekerk
BF	7	Juan Smith
OF	6	Schalk Burger
RL	5	Victor Matfield
LL	4	Bakkies Botha
TP	3	CJ van der Linde
HK	2	John Smit (c)
LP	1	Os du Randt
Replacements:
HK	16	Hanyani Shimange
PR	17	Eddie Andrews
LK	18	Albert van den Berg
N8	19	Jacques Cronjé
SH	20	Fourie du Preez
FB	21	Jaco van der Westhuyzen
CE	22	Marius Joubert
Coach:
Jake White

=== Round 6 ===
3 September 2005
19:35 NZST (UTC+12)

(1 BP) New Zealand	34–24	Australia (1 BP)
Try: Howlett (3); McCaw; Con: MacDonald; Pen: MacDonald; McAlister (3)		Try: Chisholm; Gerrard; Johansson; Tuqiri; Con: Rogers (2)

Eden Park, Auckland
Attendance: 45,000
Referee: Chris White (England)

FB	15	Mils Muliaina
RW	14	Doug Howlett
OC	13	Tana Umaga (c)
IC	12	Aaron Mauger
LW	11	Joe Rokocoko
FH	10	Leon MacDonald
SH	9	Piri Weepu
N8	8	Rodney So'oialo
OF	7	Richie McCaw
BF	6	Sione Lauaki
RL	5	Ali Williams
LL	4	Chris Jack
TP	3	Carl Hayman
HK	2	Keven Mealamu
LP	1	Tony Woodcock
Replacements:
HK	16	Derren Witcombe
PR	17	Greg Somerville
LK	18	James Ryan
FL	19	Marty Holah
SH	20	Kevin Senio
FH	21	Luke McAlister
CE	22	Conrad Smith
Coach:
(New Zealand) Graham Henry

FB	15	Drew Mitchell
RW	14	Mark Gerrard
OC	13	Clyde Rathbone
IC	12	Morgan Turinui
LW	11	Lote Tuqiri
FH	10	Mat Rogers
SH	9	George Gregan (c)
N8	8	George Smith
OF	7	Phil Waugh
BF	6	Rocky Elsom
RL	5	Nathan Sharpe
LL	4	Mark Chisholm
TP	3	Al Baxter
HK	2	Brendan Cannon
LP	1	Bill Young
Replacements:
HK	16	Adam Freier
PR	17	Matt Dunning
LK	18	Al Kanaar
N8	19	John Roe
SH	20	Chris Whitaker
FH	21	Lachlan MacKay
CE	22	Lloyd Johansson
Coach:
Eddie Jones

== Statistical leaders ==
- Leading try scorers:
  - Bryan Habana (SA), Doug Howlett (NZ), Joe Rokocoko (NZ) – 3 each
- Leading point scorer:
  - Percy Montgomery (SA) – 52
