= 2006 Tri Nations Series =

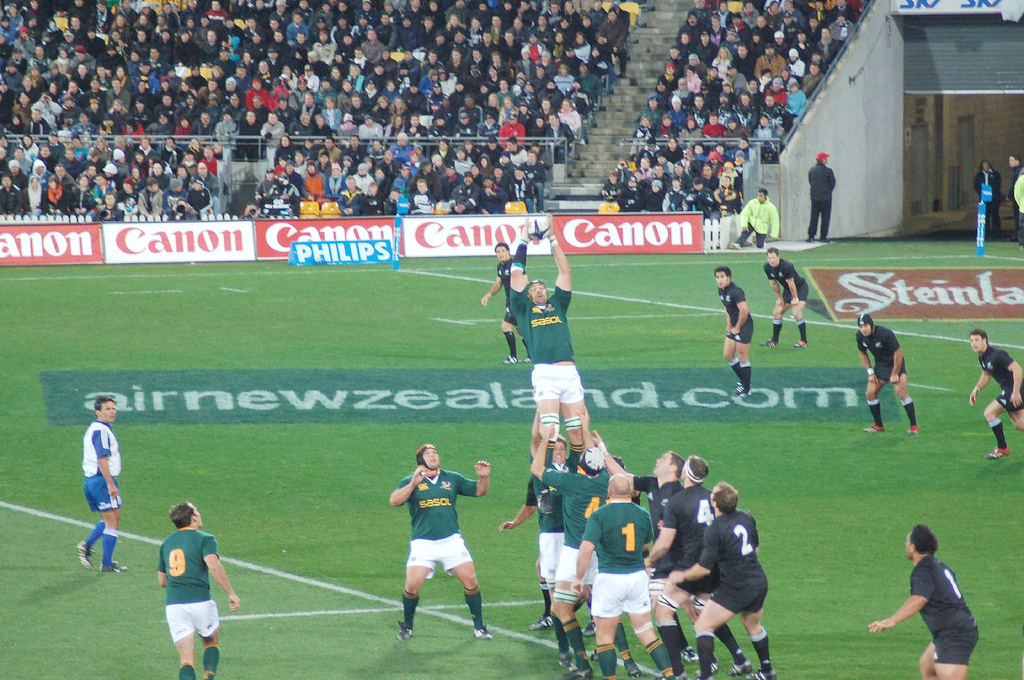

Final positions
- Champions: New Zealand (7th title)
- Bledisloe Cup: New Zealand
- Freedom Cup: New Zealand
- Mandela Challenge Plate: Australia

Tournament statistics
- Matches played: 9
- Tries scored: 42 (4.67 per match)
- Attendance: 406,899 (45,211 per match)
- Top scorer(s): (New Zealand) Dan Carter (99)
- Most tries: (Australia) Lote Tuqiri (3) (South Africa) Jaque Fourie (3)

The 2006 Tri Nations Series was the 10th Tri Nations Series, an annual rugby union competition between the national teams of Australia, New Zealand and South Africa. New Zealand won the competition with three rounds still to play after their victory over Australia on 19 August, their 21st consecutive home win.

For the first time, in 2006 each team played the others three times, instead of twice, as had been the case previously. This was the result of a new television deal between SANZAR, the consortium of the three countries' rugby federations that organises the tournament, and broadcasters in the SANZAR countries and the United Kingdom. As a result, the duration of the competition was extended and it ran from 8 July to 9 September.

New Zealand won all three matches against Australia, thus retaining the Bledisloe Cup. They also won two of their three matches against South Africa, thereby winning the Freedom Cup for the first time. Australia regained the Mandela Challenge Plate after winning their two home tests against South Africa.

== Standings ==
Place	Nation	Games				Points			Bonus points	Table points
Place	Nation	Played	Won	Drawn	Lost	For	Against	Difference	Bonus points	Table points
1	New Zealand	6	5	0	1	179	112	+67	3	23
2	Australia	6	2	0	4	133	121	+12	3	11
3	South Africa	6	2	0	4	106	185	−79	1	9

== Format ==
As in past competitions, points were earned as follows:

- 4 points for a win
- 2 points for a draw
- 0 points for a loss
- 1 bonus point for scoring four tries or more, win or lose
- 1 bonus point for a loss by seven points or fewer

== The run-up ==
=== Australia ===
At the end of 2005, the Wallabies looked to be in decline after having just ended an all-time record Test losing streak of seven. The streak led to the sacking of coach Eddie Jones and his replacement by John Connolly. The 2006 mid-year Tests saw improvement with two wins over England and a win over Ireland. Ireland's captain Brian O'Driscoll – who played against both Australia and New Zealand in Ireland's mid-year Tests – was more impressed by the Wallabies, and tipped them as favourites over the All Blacks.

=== New Zealand ===
Going into the competition, not withstanding O'Driscoll's assessment, New Zealand were the favourites, having lost just one Test in 2005 and gone undefeated through the 2006 mid-year Tests. Blacks coach Graham Henry used the mid-year Tests to experiment with his squad. They had to come back in the last 20 minutes to win their first Test against Ireland, and had to survive a push by Argentina at José Amalfitani Stadium in Buenos Aires. Despite these close victories and much New Zealand complacency, the All Blacks possessed a strong, coordinated pack, playmakers, explosive backs and blistering pace out wide. Their most important asset was their depth.

Before the first test, the Australian television channel Seven aired an advertisement in which the All Blacks performed the Ka Mate haka with digitally inserted handbags, a reference to an incident where Tana Umaga hit a Hurricane teammate over the head with a woman's handbag, breaking her cellular phone. This advertisement was seen by some as offensive to both Maori and the All Blacks. The All Blacks performed the new Kapa o Pango haka instead of the Ka Mate in Christchurch for the first time against Australia. Some observers found gestures used in this haka to be offensive.

=== South Africa ===
Of the three teams in the competition, the Springboks entered with the most questions. The selection policy of coach Jake White was controversial in 2005, with White choosing to primarily stay with veterans of South Africa's victorious 2004 Tri Nations squad. His choices eventually panned out, with the Boks only narrowly losing out to New Zealand in the 2005 Tri Nations.

White largely stayed with his veterans in the 2006 mid-year Tests, which led to even more controversy among Boks supporters. In the meantime, several key Boks players were unavailable during the mid-year Tests due to injury, among them André Pretorius and Bakkies Botha. The Boks won two Tests over Scotland, but suffered a huge blow in the second Test when 2004 World Player of the Year Schalk Burger suffered a career-threatening neck injury. Recent articles indicated that Schalk Burger had a successful operation to his neck and he may play again next year. They went on to lose to France at Newlands, their first home loss since 2003. In that Test, they lost two key backs, Jean de Villiers and Bryan Habana, to rib injuries. De Villiers was initially expected to be out for the entire Tri Nations, though he returned for the final two matches, but Habana recovered in time for the series opener. As for other players, Pretorius would be out for at least the first two Boks matches, while Botha was out for the entire series. Partly due to the injuries, White named four newcomers to his Tri Nations squad.

During the lead-in to the Tri Nations, White also caused considerable controversy by publicly seeking an extension to his contract through 2009, even after the loss to France. Also, he was heavily criticised for his refusal to select flanker Luke Watson, arguably the country's form player, even after the loss of Burger. The criticism became more intense after the Boks' hammering in their Tri Nations opener.

== Fixtures and results ==
Kick-off times are local

=== Round 1 ===
8 July 2006
19:35 NZST (UTC+12)

(1 BP) New Zealand	32–12	Australia
Try: Mealamu (2) 28' c, 35' c McCaw 49' c Toeava 78' m Con: Carter (3/4); Pen: Carter (2/6) 47', 54'		Try: Tuqiri 16' c Fava 51' m Con: Mortlock (1/2) 17'

Lancaster Park, Christchurch
Attendance: 33,727
Referee: Jonathan Kaplan (South Africa)

FB	15	Leon MacDonald	(substituted off) 70'
RW	14	Rico Gear	(substituted off) 59'	(substituted on) 61'
OC	13	Mils Muliaina
IC	12	Aaron Mauger
LW	11	Joe Rokocoko
FH	10	Dan Carter
SH	9	Byron Kelleher	(substituted off) 64'
N8	8	Rodney So'oialo	(substituted off) 72'
OF	7	Richie McCaw (c)
BF	6	Jerry Collins
RL	5	Jason Eaton	(substituted off) 59'
LL	4	Chris Jack
TP	3	Carl Hayman
HK	2	Keven Mealamu	(substituted off) 72'
LP	1	Tony Woodcock	(substituted off) 53'
Replacements:
HK	16	Andrew Hore	(substituted on) 72'
PR	17	Greg Somerville	(substituted on) 53'
LK	18	Ali Williams	(substituted on) 59'
N8	19	Chris Masoe	(substituted on) 72'
SH	20	Piri Weepu	(substituted on) 64'
FH	21	Luke McAlister
FB	22	Isaia Toeava	(substituted on) 59'	(substituted off) 61'	(substituted on) 70'
Coach:
Graham Henry

FB	15	Chris Latham
RW	14	Mark Gerrard
OC	13	Stirling Mortlock
IC	12	Mat Rogers		(substituted off) 65'
LW	11	Lote Tuqiri
FH	10	Stephen Larkham
SH	9	George Gregan (c)		(substituted off) 70'
N8	8	Rocky Elsom	(yellow card) 26' to 36'
OF	7	George Smith		(substituted off) 70'
BF	6	Mark Chisholm		(substituted off) 50'
RL	5	Daniel Vickerman
LL	4	Nathan Sharpe
TP	3	Guy Shepherdson		(substituted off) 64'
HK	2	Tai McIsaac		(substituted off) 37'
LP	1	Greg Holmes
Replacements:
HK	16	Jeremy Paul		(substituted on) 37'
PR	17	Al Baxter		(substituted on) 64'
LK	18	Scott Fava		(substituted on) 50'
N8	19	Phil Waugh		(substituted on) 70'
SH	20	Sam Cordingley		(substituted on) 70'
CE	21	Matt Giteau		(substituted on) 65'
WG	22	Ben Tune
Coach:
John Connolly

=== Round 2 ===
15 July 2006
20:00 AEST (UTC+10)

(1 BP) Australia	49–0	South Africa
Try: Paul 16' c Holmes 25' c Giteau (2) 38' c, 75' m Latham 65' c Chisholm 80+4' c Con: Mortlock (5/6); Pen: Mortlock (2/3) 21', 32'; Drop: Larkham 5'

Lang Park, Brisbane
Attendance: 41,578
Referee: Paul Honiss (New Zealand)

FB	15	Chris Latham
RW	14	Mark Gerrard	(substituted off) 70'
OC	13	Stirling Mortlock
IC	12	Matt Giteau	(substituted off) 76'
LW	11	Lote Tuqiri
FH	10	Stephen Larkham
SH	9	George Gregan (c)	(substituted off) 43'
N8	8	Scott Fava
OF	7	George Smith	(substituted off) 76'
BF	6	Rocky Elsom
RL	5	Daniel Vickerman	(substituted off) 43'
LL	4	Nathan Sharpe
TP	3	Guy Shepherdson
HK	2	Jeremy Paul	(substituted off) 57'
LP	1	Greg Holmes	(substituted off) 69'
Replacements:
HK	16	Sean Hardman	(substituted on) 57'
PR	17	Al Baxter	(substituted on) 69'
LK	18	Mark Chisholm	(substituted on) 43'
N8	19	Phil Waugh	(substituted on) 76'
SH	20	Sam Cordingley	(substituted on) 43'
FH	21	Mat Rogers	(substituted on) 76'
WG	22	Clyde Rathbone	(substituted on) 70'
Coach:
John Connolly

FB	15	Percy Montgomery		(substituted off) 69'
RW	14	Akona Ndungane		(substituted off) 61'
OC	13	Jaque Fourie
IC	12	Wynand Olivier		(substituted off) 65'
LW	11	Bryan Habana
FH	10	Jaco van der Westhuyzen
SH	9	Ricky Januarie		(substituted off) 63'
N8	8	Pierre Spies
OF	7	Juan Smith
BF	6	Joe van Niekerk		(substituted off) 72'
RL	5	Danie Rossouw		(substituted off) 41'
LL	4	Victor Matfield	(yellow card) 31' to 41'
TP	3	CJ van der Linde
HK	2	John Smit (c)		(substituted off) 77'
LP	1	Os du Randt		(substituted off) 50'
Replacements:
HK	16	Danie Coetzee		(substituted on) 77'
PR	17	Eddie Andrews		(substituted on) 50'
LK	18	Albert van den Berg		(substituted on) 41'
N8	19	Jacques Cronjé		(substituted on) 72'
SH	20	Fourie du Preez		(substituted on) 63'
FH	21	Meyer Bosman		(substituted on) 69'
FB	22	Breyton Paulse		(substituted on) 61'
Coach:
Jake White

=== Round 3 ===
22 July 2006
19:35 NZST (UTC+12)

New Zealand	35–17	South Africa
Try: Weepu 40+6' c McCaw 80+9' c Con: Carter (2/2) 40+7', 80+10'; Pen: Carter (7/7) 5', 21', 24', 30', 43', 52', 78'		Try: Du Preez 1' c Paulse 71' c Con: Montgomery (2/2) 2', 61'; Pen: Montgomery (1/4) 70'

Wellington Regional Stadium, Wellington
Attendance: 38,000
Referee: Joël Jutge (France)

FB	15	Leon MacDonald
RW	14	Doug Howlett
OC	13	Mils Muliaina
IC	12	Sam Tuitupou	(substituted off) 77'
LW	11	Scott Hamilton
FH	10	Dan Carter
SH	9	Piri Weepu	(substituted off) 58'
N8	8	Rodney So'oialo
OF	7	Richie McCaw (c)	(substituted off) 77'
BF	6	Reuben Thorne
RL	5	Ali Williams
LL	4	Chris Jack
TP	3	Carl Hayman
HK	2	Anton Oliver	(substituted off) 62'
LP	1	Neemia Tialata	(substituted off) 54'
Replacements:
HK	16	Andrew Hore	(substituted on) 62'
PR	17	Greg Somerville	(substituted on) 54'
LK	18	Greg Rawlinson
N8	19	Chris Masoe	(substituted on) 77'
SH	20	Jimmy Cowan	(substituted on) 58'
FH	21	Luke McAlister	(substituted on) 77'
FB	22	Isaia Toeava
Coach:
Graham Henry

FB	15	Percy Montgomery
RW	14	Breyton Paulse
OC	13	Jaque Fourie
IC	12	Wynand Olivier
LW	11	Bryan Habana
FH	10	Butch James
SH	9	Fourie du Preez
N8	8	Jacques Cronjé
OF	7	Juan Smith
BF	6	Solly Tyibilika	(substituted off) 64'
RL	5	Victor Matfield
LL	4	Albert van den Berg	(substituted off) 59'
TP	3	CJ van der Linde
HK	2	John Smit (c)
LP	1	Os du Randt
Replacements:
HK	16	Danie Coetzee
PR	17	Eddie Andrews
LK	18	Johann Muller	(substituted on) 59'
N8	19	Joe van Niekerk	(substituted on) 64'
SH	20	Ricky Januarie
FH	21	Meyer Bosman
WG	22	JP Pietersen
Coach:
Jake White

=== Round 4 ===
29 July 2006
20:00 AEST (UTC+10)

(1 BP) Australia	9–13	New Zealand
Pen: Mortlock (3/4) 8', 36', 60'		Try: Rokocoko 10' c Con: Carter (1/1) 11'; Pen: Carter (1/2) 17'; Drop: Carter 58'

Lang Park, Brisbane
Attendance: 52,498
Referee: Alain Rolland (Ireland)

FB	15	Chris Latham
RW	14	Mark Gerrard	(substituted off) 75'
OC	13	Stirling Mortlock
IC	12	Matt Giteau
LW	11	Lote Tuqiri	(substituted off) 72'
FH	10	Stephen Larkham
SH	9	George Gregan (c)	(substituted off) 74'
N8	8	Scott Fava	(substituted off) 61'
OF	7	George Smith
BF	6	Rocky Elsom	(substituted off) 61'
RL	5	Daniel Vickerman
LL	4	Nathan Sharpe
TP	3	Rodney Blake	(substituted off) 77'
HK	2	Jeremy Paul	(substituted off) 61'
LP	1	Greg Holmes
Replacements:
HK	16	Tai McIsaac	(substituted on) 61'
PR	17	Guy Shepherdson	(substituted on) 77'
LK	18	Mark Chisholm	(substituted on) 61'
N8	19	Phil Waugh	(substituted on) 61'
SH	20	Sam Cordingley	(substituted on) 74'
FH	21	Mat Rogers	(substituted on) 75'
WG	22	Clyde Rathbone	(substituted on) 72'
Coach:
John Connolly

FB	15	Leon MacDonald
RW	14	Rico Gear
OC	13	Mils Muliaina
IC	12	Aaron Mauger
LW	11	Joe Rokocoko
FH	10	Dan Carter
SH	9	Byron Kelleher	(substituted off) 74'
N8	8	Rodney So'oialo
OF	7	Richie McCaw (c)
BF	6	Jerry Collins	(substituted off) 61'
RL	5	Ali Williams	(substituted off) 72'
LL	4	Chris Jack
TP	3	Carl Hayman
HK	2	Keven Mealamu	(substituted off) 76'
LP	1	Tony Woodcock	(substituted off) 68'
Replacements:
HK	16	Andrew Hore	(substituted on) 76'
PR	17	Greg Somerville	(substituted on) 68'
LK	18	Jason Eaton	(substituted on) 72'
N8	19	Chris Masoe	(substituted on) 61'
SH	20	Jimmy Cowan	(substituted on) 74'
FH	21	Luke McAlister
FB	22	Isaia Toeava
Coach:
Graham Henry

Notes:

- New Zealand retain Bledisloe Cup

=== Round 5 ===
5 August 2006
20:00 AEST (UTC+10)

Australia	20–18	South Africa (1 BP)
Try: Gerrard 33' c Rogers 78' c Con: Mortlock (2/2) 34', 79'; Pen: Mortlock (2/4) 11', 66'		Try: Fourie 56' c Montgomery 69' m Con: James (1/2) 57'; Pen: James (2/2) 46', 48'

Stadium Australia, Sydney
Attendance: 60,522
Referee: Joël Jutge (France)

FB	15	Chris Latham
RW	14	Mark Gerrard	(substituted off) 74'
OC	13	Stirling Mortlock
IC	12	Matt Giteau
LW	11	Lote Tuqiri
FH	10	Stephen Larkham	(substituted off) 71'
SH	9	George Gregan (c)	(substituted off) 74'
N8	8	Wycliff Palu
OF	7	George Smith	(substituted off) 55'
BF	6	Rocky Elsom	(substituted off) 74'
RL	5	Daniel Vickerman
LL	4	Nathan Sharpe
TP	3	Rodney Blake
HK	2	Tai McIsaac	(substituted off) 60'
LP	1	Greg Holmes
Replacements:
HK	16	Jeremy Paul	(substituted on) 60'
PR	17	Guy Shepherdson
LK	18	Mark Chisholm	(substituted on) 74'
N8	19	Phil Waugh	(substituted on) 55'
SH	20	Sam Cordingley	(substituted on) 74'
FH	21	Mat Rogers	(substituted on) 71'
WG	22	Clyde Rathbone	(substituted on) 74'
Coach:
John Connolly

FB	15	Percy Montgomery
RW	14	Akona Ndungane
OC	13	Jaque Fourie
IC	12	Wynand Olivier
LW	11	Bryan Habana
FH	10	Butch James
SH	9	Fourie du Preez
N8	8	Jacques Cronjé
OF	7	Juan Smith
BF	6	Solomzi Tyibilika	(substituted off) 71'
RL	5	Victor Matfield
LL	4	Johann Muller	(substituted off) 77'
TP	3	CJ van der Linde
HK	2	John Smit (c)
LP	1	Os du Randt
Replacements:
HK	16	Chiliboy Ralepelle
PR	17	Eddie Andrews
LK	18	Albert van den Berg	(substituted on) 77'
N8	19	Joe van Niekerk	(substituted on) 71'
SH	20	Ricky Januarie
FH	21	Meyer Bosman
FB	22	Jaco van der Westhuyzen
Coach:
Jake White

=== Round 6 ===
19 August 2006
17:30 NZST (UTC+12)

New Zealand	34–27	Australia (1 BP)
Try: Eaton 36' m Jack 53' c McAlister 68' c Con: Carter (2/3) 54', 69'; Pen: Carter (5/6) 6', 20', 46', 51', 79'		Try: Tuqiri (2) 25' c, 71' c Elsom 39' c Con: Mortlock (3/3); Pen: Mortlock (2/2) 3', 15'

Eden Park, Auckland
Attendance: 45,000
Referee: Chris White (England)

FB	15	Mils Muliaina
RW	14	Doug Howlett
OC	13	Isaia Toeava	(substituted off) 43'
IC	12	Luke McAlister
LW	11	Joe Rokocoko
FH	10	Dan Carter
SH	9	Byron Kelleher	(substituted off) 46'
N8	8	Rodney So'oialo	(substituted off) 67'
OF	7	Richie McCaw (c)
BF	6	Jerry Collins
RL	5	Jason Eaton	(substituted off) 54'
LL	4	Chris Jack
TP	3	Carl Hayman	(substituted off) 26'
HK	2	Keven Mealamu
LP	1	Tony Woodcock
Replacements:
HK	16	Andrew Hore
PR	17	Greg Somerville	(substituted on) 26'
LK	18	Ali Williams	(substituted on) 54'
N8	19	Chris Masoe	(substituted on) 67'
SH	20	Piri Weepu	(substituted on) 46'
FH	21	Sam Tuitupou
FB	22	Leon MacDonald	(substituted on) 43'
Coach:
Graham Henry

FB	15	Chris Latham
RW	14	Clyde Rathbone
OC	13	Stirling Mortlock
IC	12	Matt Giteau
LW	11	Lote Tuqiri
FH	10	Stephen Larkham		(substituted off) 69'
SH	9	George Gregan (c)
N8	8	Wycliff Palu
OF	7	Phil Waugh	(yellow card) 78' to 80'
BF	6	Rocky Elsom		(substituted off) 67'
RL	5	Daniel Vickerman
LL	4	Nathan Sharpe
TP	3	Rodney Blake		(substituted off) 69'
HK	2	Jeremy Paul
LP	1	Greg Holmes
Replacements:
HK	16	Tai McIsaac
PR	17	Al Baxter		(substituted on) 69'
LK	18	Mark Chisholm		(substituted on) 67'
N8	19	George Smith
SH	20	Brett Sheehan
FH	21	Mark Gerrard
WG	22	Mat Rogers		(substituted on) 69'
Coach:
John Connolly

=== Round 7 ===
26 August 2006
15:00 SAST (UTC+02)

South Africa	26–45	New Zealand (1 BP)
Try: Du Preez 10' m Fourie (2) 63' m, 70' c Con: Pretorius (1/2) 71'; Pen: Montgomery (2/2) 1', 48'; James (1/1) 3'		Try: Tialata 36' c McAlister 45' c Sivivatu 55' m Muliaina 57' c Gear 75' c Con: Carter (4/5); Pen: Carter (4/4) 6', 21', 40+6', 51'

Loftus Versfeld Stadium, Pretoria
Attendance: 52,000
Referee: Alan Lewis (Ireland)

FB	15	Percy Montgomery	(substituted off) 61'
RW	14	Akona Ndungane
OC	13	Jaque Fourie
IC	12	Jean de Villiers	(substituted off) 77'
LW	11	Bryan Habana
FH	10	Butch James	(substituted off) 59'
SH	9	Fourie du Preez
N8	8	Jacques Cronjé
OF	7	Pierre Spies
BF	6	Solomzi Tyibilika	(substituted off) 47'
RL	5	Victor Matfield	(substituted off) 61'
LL	4	Johann Muller
TP	3	CJ van der Linde	(substituted off) 23'
HK	2	John Smit (c)
LP	1	Os du Randt	(substituted off) 78'
Replacements:
HK	16	Chiliboy Ralepelle	(substituted on) 78'
PR	17	BJ Botha	(substituted on) 23'
LK	18	Albert van den Berg	(substituted on) 61'
N8	19	Pedrie Wannenburg	(substituted on) 47'
SH	20	Ruan Pienaar	(substituted on) 61'
FH	21	Wynand Olivier	(substituted on) 77'
FB	22	André Pretorius	(substituted on) 59'
Coach:
Jake White

FB	15	Leon MacDonald	(substituted off) 12'
RW	14	Rico Gear
OC	13	Mils Muliaina
IC	12	Luke McAlister	(substituted off) 64'
LW	11	Sitiveni Sivivatu
FH	10	Dan Carter
SH	9	Piri Weepu	(substituted off) 63'
N8	8	Chris Masoe	(substituted off) 51'
OF	7	Richie McCaw (c)
BF	6	Reuben Thorne
RL	5	Ali Williams
LL	4	Greg Rawlinson	(substituted off) 47'
TP	3	Greg Somerville	(substituted off) 16'
HK	2	Anton Oliver	(substituted off) 59'
LP	1	Neemia Tialata
Replacements:
HK	16	Keven Mealamu	(substituted on) 59'
PR	17	Tony Woodcock	(substituted on) 16'
LK	18	Chris Jack	(substituted on) 47'
N8	19	Jerry Collins	(substituted on) 51'
SH	20	Jimmy Cowan	(substituted on) 63'
FH	21	Sam Tuitupou	(substituted on) 64'
WG	22	Isaia Toeava	(substituted on) 12'
Coach:
Graham Henry

=== Round 8 ===
2 September 2006
15:00 SAST (UTC+02)

South Africa	21–20	New Zealand (1 BP)
Try: Habana 24' c Wannenburg 53' m Con: Pretorius (1/2); Pen: Pretorius (3/3) 6', 17', 78'		Try: Carter 20' c Rokocoko 66' c Con: Carter (2/2); Pen: Carter (2/2) 10', 40'

Royal Bafokeng Stadium, Rustenburg
Attendance: 25,428
Referee: Chris White (England)

FB	15	Jaque Fourie
RW	14	Akona Ndungane	(substituted off) 50'
OC	13	Wynand Olivier
IC	12	Jean de Villiers
LW	11	Bryan Habana
FH	10	André Pretorius
SH	9	Fourie du Preez	(substituted off) 53'
N8	8	Pedrie Wannenburg
OF	7	AJ Venter
BF	6	Pierre Spies
RL	5	Victor Matfield
LL	4	Johann Muller
TP	3	BJ Botha
HK	2	John Smit (c)
LP	1	Os du Randt	(substituted off) 23'	(substituted on) 29'	(substituted off) 73'
Replacements:
HK	16	Chiliboy Ralepelle
PR	17	Lawrence Sephaka	(substituted on) 23'	(substituted off) 29'	(substituted on) 73'
LK	18	Albert van den Berg
N8	19	Jacques Cronjé
SH	20	Ruan Pienaar	(substituted on) 53'
FH	21	Butch James
FB	22	Breyton Paulse	(substituted on) 50'
Coach:
Jake White

FB	15	Doug Howlett
RW	14	Joe Rokocoko
OC	13	Mils Muliaina
IC	12	Aaron Mauger
LW	11	Sitiveni Sivivatu	(substituted off) 61'
FH	10	Dan Carter
SH	9	Jimmy Cowan	(substituted off) 61'
N8	8	Rodney So'oialo
OF	7	Richie McCaw (c)	(substituted off) 48'	(substituted on) 51'
BF	6	Jerry Collins
RL	5	Ali Williams
LL	4	Chris Jack	(substituted off) 57'
TP	3	Carl Hayman
HK	2	Andrew Hore	(substituted off) 61'
LP	1	Tony Woodcock	(substituted off) 64'
Replacements:
HK	16	Anton Oliver	(substituted on) 61'
PR	17	Neemia Tialata	(substituted on) 64'
LK	18	Jason Eaton	(substituted on) 57'
N8	19	Marty Holah	(substituted on) 48'	(substituted off) 51'
SH	20	Byron Kelleher	(substituted on) 61'
FH	21	Luke McAlister
WG	22	Rico Gear	(substituted on) 61'
Coach:
Graham Henry

=== Round 9 ===
9 September 2006
15:00 SAST (UTC+02)

South Africa	24–16	Australia
Try: Du Preez 57' c Paulse 71' m Con: Pretorius (1/2); Pen: Pretorius (3/5) 37', 42', 48'; Drop: Pretorius 53'		Try: Larkham 44' c Con: Mortlock (1/1); Pen: Mortlock (3/4) 17', 60', 62'

Ellis Park Stadium, Johannesburg
Attendance: 50,178
Referee: Steve Walsh (New Zealand)

FB	15	JP Pietersen
RW	14	Akona Ndungane	(substituted off) 41'
OC	13	Jaque Fourie
IC	12	Jean de Villiers
LW	11	Wynand Olivier
FH	10	André Pretorius
SH	9	Fourie du Preez	(substituted off) 83'
N8	8	Pedrie Wannenburg
OF	7	AJ Venter	(substituted off) 72'
BF	6	Pierre Spies
RL	5	Victor Matfield	(substituted off) 83'
LL	4	Johann Muller
TP	3	BJ Botha
HK	2	John Smit (c)
LP	1	Os du Randt	(substituted off) 80'
Replacements:
HK	16	Chiliboy Ralepelle
PR	17	Lawrence Sephaka	(substituted on) 80'
LK	18	Albert van den Berg	(substituted on) 83'
N8	19	Jacques Cronjé	(substituted on) 72'
SH	20	Ruan Pienaar	(substituted on) 83'
FH	21	Butch James
FB	22	Breyton Paulse	(substituted on) 41'
Coach:
Jake White

FB	15	Chris Latham
RW	14	Clyde Rathbone
OC	13	Stirling Mortlock
IC	12	Matt Giteau
LW	11	Cameron Shepherd	(substituted off) 59'
FH	10	Stephen Larkham	(substituted off) 80'
SH	9	George Gregan (c)	(substituted off) 79'
N8	8	Wycliff Palu	(substituted off) 79'
OF	7	Phil Waugh
BF	6	Rocky Elsom	(substituted off) 58'
RL	5	Daniel Vickerman
LL	4	Nathan Sharpe
TP	3	Rodney Blake	(substituted off) 66'	(substituted on) 85'
HK	2	Jeremy Paul	(substituted off) 88'
LP	1	Benn Robinson	(substituted off) 85'
Replacements:
HK	16	Tai McIsaac	(substituted on) 88'
PR	17	Al Baxter	(substituted on) 66'
LK	18	Mark Chisholm	(substituted on) 58'
N8	19	George Smith	(substituted on) 79'
SH	20	Brett Sheehan	(substituted on) 79'
FH	21	Mark Gerrard	(substituted on) 59'
WG	22	Scott Staniforth	(substituted on) 80'
Coach:
John Connolly
