= Hoërskool Dinamika =

Location
- 55 Roy Campbell Street, Brackenhurst; Alberton, Gauteng; South Africa
- Coordinates: 26°18′48″S 28°06′03″E

Information
- School type: Public
- Motto: Reik na die Lig
- Religious affiliation: Christianity
- Established: 1993; 33 years ago
- School district: District 9
- Headmaster: Johan Schutte
- Grades: 8–12
- Gender: Boys & Girls
- Age: 14 to 18
- Enrollment: 1,200 pupils
- Language: Afrikaans; English
- Schedule: 07:30 - 14:00
- Campus: Urban Campus
- Campus type: Suburban
- Colours: Blue; Teal; White
- Nickname: Namies
- Accreditation: Gauteng Department of Education

Hoërskool Dinamika is a public Afrikaans and English parallel-medium, co-educational high school situated in a suburb of Brackenhurst in the city of Alberton in the Gauteng province of South Africa. Hoërskool Dinamika maintains a high standard in leadership, culture and sport.

== Music Festival ==
Hoërskool Dinamika held an annual music festival, where some of the biggest bands and well-known artists from South Africa performed. The annual music festival—better known as the "TusseniPale Musiekfees" ("Between the posts - Music festival") - was started by Sandra Pretorius,(Stemmet, now living in Canberra, Australia) a former teacher of the school. It was first held in 2005, where The Finkelstiens, Shine4, Melkertkommissie and ddisselblom were among the top performers.

Gerhard Steyn also featured in the first annual music festival and was one of the first acts of a group called Vonk. He did not get as much attention as most of the other bands as he was still new to the industry.

== Namies Online ==
Hoërskool Dinamika has its own social network, created by Ruan van Heerden in early 2009 and hosted freely on the Ning platform. The social network has a small following of which most is old alumni and a few freshmen pupils. The network is open for all alumni to join and was originally intended for the sharing of information in the Afrikaans language.

The network shut down on Friday August 20, 2010 due to Ning closing all free accounts. Since then, several students and alumni requested for it to be reinstated. The Namies Online network restarted on its own .net server on 19 September 2011, choosing to use Elgg software - an open source solution.

== Notable alumni ==
- André Pretorius
