= André Pretorius =

South African rugby union player

- Full name: André Stefan Pretorius
- Born: 29 December 1978 (age 47) Johannesburg, South Africa
- Height: 1.76 m (5 ft 9 1/2 in)
- Weight: 90 kg (14 st 2 lb; 198 lb)
- School: Hoërskool Dinamika, Alberton
- University: Rand Afrikaans University

Rugby union career
- Position: Fly-half
Youth career
- 1998–1999: Golden Lions
Senior career
Years	Team	Apps	(Points)
1999–2009	Golden Lions	46	(545)
2002–2006	Cats	47	(498)
2007–2009	Lions	23	(147)
2010	Force	0	(0)
2010	Sharks (Currie Cup)	8	(12)
2011	Lions	2	(16)
2011	Golden Lions	5	(51)
2011	Toulon	5	(6)
2012–2013	Leopards	27	(313)
2013–2014	Carcassonne	23	(133)
2014	Leopards	12	(132)
1999–2014	Total	198	(1,853)
- Correct as of 27 May 2015
International career
Years	Team	Apps	(Points)
1998	South Africa Under-21	6	(59)
2000–2001	South Africa Sevens		
2001	South Africa Under-23	2	(14)
2001	South African Barbarians	1	(0)
2002–2007	South Africa (tests)	31	(171)
2004	South Africa 'A'	3	(27)
2007	South Africa (tour)	2	(3)
- Correct as of 3 May 2014

André Stefan Pretorius (born 29 December 1978 in Johannesburg, South Africa) is a former South African rugby union footballer that played professionally between 1999 and 2014. His usual position was at fly-half. He has been capped by his country's national side, the Springboks and was a member of the 2007 Rugby World Cup squad that was crowned world champions.

He spent the first decade of his career (between 1999 and 2009) in Johannesburg, where he played Super Rugby and the Lions (initially known as the Cats) and domestic South African provincial rugby for the Golden Lions, returning there for another spell in 2011. He also played with the Sharks and the Leopards and had spells at French clubs Toulon and Carcassonne.

== Career ==
Pretorius made his international debut for the Springboks on 8 June 2002 at fly-half against Wales at the Free State Stadium in Bloemfontein. The Springboks won 34–19, with Pretorius kicking three conversions and one penalty goal. He played in the subsequent 19–8 victory over the Welsh. He notched up one try, five conversions and three penalty goals in his third match as a Springbok against Argentina. When kicking at goal, he would usually create his own tee out of dirt, drawing an arrow on the ground towards the goal.

After playing in another Test against Samoa, in which he again played a large role with his kicking ability, Pretorius was included in the Springboks 2002 Tri Nations Series squad. He played in three Tri Nations matches, two against the All Blacks and one against Australia, with South Africa losing all three. He earned a further three caps for the Springboks that year in November against Northern Hemisphere sides, playing matches against France, England and Scotland, all of which South Africa lost.

He returned to international duties in July 2003 as a reserve in the 52–16 loss against the All Blacks during the 2003 Tri Nations Series. He was moved to fullback for the following match against Australia which the Springboks lost 29–9. He next played for the Springboks on 23 July 2005 as fly-half against Australia during the 2005 Tri Nations Series, which the Springboks won 22–16, with Pretorius landing a drop goal. He played at fly-half in the subsequent matches and earned another international cap in November in the 34–23 win over Argentina in Buenos Aires.

After undergoing major surgery, Pretorius turned out for the Lions in the 2006 Currie Cup season. Putting the surgery setbacks behind him, he guided the Lions to a 74–15 win over the Pumas in round seven. Pretorius himself scored a try, as well as eight conversions and a penalty goal – 24 of the Lions' total 74 points.

In 2007, he returned to the national side and became Jake White's 2nd-choice fly-half to Butch James, playing an extensive reserve role in the 2007 Rugby World Cup, coming on as a replacement in the final which South Africa won 15–6 against England.

On 19 June 2009, Perth-based Super Rugby franchise the Western Force announced Pretorius as its international marquee-signing for the 2010 Super 14 season. However, he failed to appear in any matches for the side and he returned to South Africa to rejoin the Lions.

In May 2011, he signed up with French club Toulon, where he made 5 appearances.

He returned to South Africa to play for the Potchefstroom-based Leopards at the start of 2012. He had one more spell in France, this time with Carcassonne for the 2013–14 Rugby Pro D2 season. In 2014, he returned to the Leopards once again, where he made a further 12 appearances in the 2014 Currie Cup qualification series and 2014 Currie Cup First Division before announcing his retirement as a player.

== Coaching career ==
After retiring in 2014, Pretorius pursued coaching and is currently the backline coach at Hino Red Dolphins.
