= Jaque Fourie =

South African rugby union player

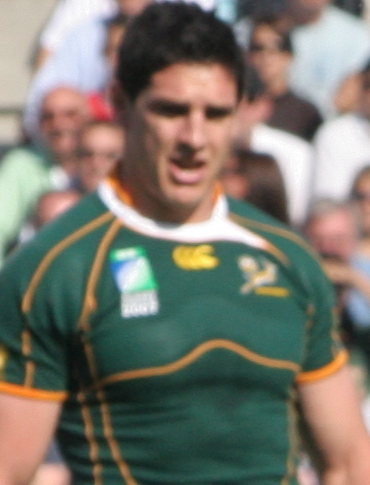
- Fourie in 2007
- Born: Jaque Fourie; 4 March 1983 (age 43) Carletonville, South Africa
- Height: 1.90 m (6 ft 3 in)
- Weight: 105 kg (231 lb; 16 st 7 lb)
- School: Hoërskool Monument
- University: Rand Afrikaans University
- Occupation: Professional rugby union footballer

Rugby union career
- Position(s): Centre, Wing, Fullback
Senior career
Years	Team	Apps	(Points)
2011	Panasonic Wild Knights	12	(55)
2012–2017	Kobelco Steelers	52	(170)
- Correct as of 15 January 2017
Provincial / State sides
Years	Team	Apps	(Points)
2002–2009	Golden Lions	13	(10)
2010–2011	Western Province	3	(0)
- Correct as of 9 August 2012
Super Rugby
Years	Team	Apps	(Points)
2003–2009	Lions	68	(120)
2010–2011	Stormers	30	(65)
- Correct as of 22 September 2011
International career
Years	Team	Apps	(Points)
2003–2014	South Africa	72	(160)
- Correct as of 24 November 2013
Medal record
Men's Rugby union
Representing South Africa
Rugby World Cup
Gold medal – first place	2007 England	Squad

Jaque Fourie (born 4 March 1983) is a South African former professional rugby union player. He was a versatile backline player whose usual position was in the centres. He was a member of the 2007 Rugby World Cup winning team, playing at outside centre for 6 out of 7 matches, including all 80 minutes of the World Cup Final, which South Africa won 15–6.

== Career ==
Fourie made his international debut on 11 October at the 2003 Rugby World Cup at outside centre for the Springboks against Uruguay at Subiaco Oval in Perth, and scored a try on debut. He also played against Georgia during the pool stages, scoring another try. He was a reserve for subsequent World Cup games against Samoa and the All Blacks.

He next played for the Springboks in June 2004, playing on the left wing against Ireland, which South Africa won 26–17. He played a further three times for the Springboks that year; against England at Twickenham, Scotland at Murrayfield in November as well as a match against Argentina at José Amalfitani Stadium in Buenos Aires.

The following year he played in the IRB Rugby Aid Match and was a reserve for the Springboks against Uruguay and France in June, before being included in the Springboks 2005 Tri Nations Series. He played in a further three tests that November. In 2006, he played for the Springboks during the mid year tests and after that he became the first-choice outside centre in the side, usually playing alongside Jean de Villiers (at inside centre).

On 20 October 2007 he won a Rugby World Cup winners' medal when South Africa beat England 15–6 in the 2007 Rugby World Cup final in Paris.

After playing much of 2008 and the 2009 series against the British & Irish Lions off the bench, he was back in the starting team for the 2009 Tri-Nations campaign (won by South Africa). He played his 50th test match for South Africa in a 6–21 loss to Australia in Brisbane on 5 September 2009.

In March 2010 a try scored by Fourie was named as the International Rugby Players Association Try of the Year 2009. The try, scored in the 74th minute of the second Test against the British & Irish Lions in Pretoria in June, sealed a dramatic Series victory for the Springboks.

In March 2017, Fourie was named as part of a new re-branded Western Force team to play in the new World Series Rugby in the lead up to the National Rugby Championship.

== International Tries ==
Try	Opposing team	Location	Venue	Competition	Date	Result
1	Uruguay	Perth, Australia	Subiaco Oval	Rugby World Cup	11 October 2003	Won
2	Georgia	Sydney, Australia	Sydney Football Stadium	Rugby World Cup	24 October 2003	Won
3	Samoa	Brisbane, Australia	Lang Park	Rugby World Cup	1 November 2003	Won
4	Ireland	Cape Town, South Africa	Newlands Stadium	Test Match	19 June 2004	Won
5	Scotland	Edinburgh, Scotland	Murrayfield	Test Match	27 November 2004	Won
6	Uruguay	East London, South Africa	Buffalo City Stadium	Test Match	11 June 2005	Won
7	Australia	Johannesburg, South Africa	Ellis Park	Mandela Challenge Plate	23 July 2005	Won
8	New Zealand	Dunedin, New Zealand	Carisbrook	Tri Nations	27 August 2005	Lost
9	Argentina	Buenos Aires, Argentina	José Amalfitani Stadium	Test Match	5 November 2005	Won
10	France	Paris, France	Stade de France	Test Match	26 November 2005	Lost
11	Australia	Sydney, Australia	Stadium Australia	Tri Nations	5 August 2006	Lost
12	New Zealand	Pretoria, South Africa	Loftus Versfeld Stadium	Tri Nations	26 August 2006	Lost
13	New Zealand	Pretoria, South Africa	Loftus Versfeld Stadium	Tri Nations	26 August 2006	Lost
14	Australia	Cape Town, South Africa	Newlands Stadium	Tri Nations	16 June 2007	Won
15	Namibia	Cape Town, South Africa	Newlands Stadium	Test Match	15 August 2007	Won
16	Scotland	Edinburgh, Scotland	Murrayfield	Test Match	25 August 2007	Won
17	Samoa	Paris, France	Parc des Princes	Rugby World Cup	9 September 2007	Won
18	United States	Montpellier, France	Stade de la Mosson	Rugby World Cup	30 September 2007	Won
19	United States	Montpellier, France	Stade de la Mosson	Rugby World Cup	30 September 2007	Won
20	Fiji	Marseille, France	Stade Vélodrome	Rugby World Cup	7 October 2007	Won
21	Wales	Cardiff, Wales	Millennium Stadium	Test Match	24 November 2007	Won
22	Wales	Cardiff, Wales	Millennium Stadium	Test Match	24 November 2007	Won
23	Scotland	Edinburgh, Scotland	Murrayfield	Test Match	15 November 2008	Won
24	England	London, England	Twickenham	Test Match	22 November 2008	Won
25	British & Irish Lions	Pretoria, South Africa	Loftus Versfeld Stadium	Test Match	27 June 2009	Won
26	New Zealand	Bloemfontein, South Africa	Free State Stadium	Tri Nations	25 July 2009	Won
27	Australia	Perth, Australia	Subiaco Oval	Tri Nations	29 August 2009	Won
28	Italy	Udine, Italy	Stadio Friuli	Test Match	21 November 2009	Won
29	Australia	Brisbane, Australia	Lang Park	Tri Nations	24 July 2010	Lost
30	Australia	Bloemfontein, South Africa	Free State Stadium	Tri Nations	4 September 2010	Lost
31	Fiji	Wellington, New Zealand	Westpac Stadium	Rugby World Cup	17 September 2011	Won
32	Namibia	North Shore City, New Zealand	North Harbour Stadium	Rugby World Cup	22 September 2011	Won

Source: scrum.com
