= Juan Smith =

Former South African rugby union player

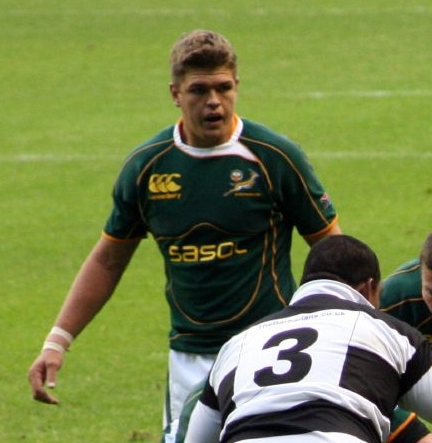
- Smith during a match
- Born: Juanne Hugo Smith; 30 July 1981 (age 45) Bloemfontein, South Africa
- Height: 1.96 m (6 ft 5 in)
- Weight: 112 kg (17 st 9 lb)
- School: JBM Hertzog High School

Rugby union career
- Position: Flanker or Number eight
Senior career
Years	Team	Apps	(Points)
2013–2017	Toulon	96	(70)
2017	Toyota Verblitz	0	(0)
- Correct as of 30 June 2019
Provincial / State sides
Years	Team	Apps	(Points)
2002–2011	Cheetahs	18	(20)
- Correct as of 19 April 2012
Super Rugby
Years	Team	Apps	(Points)
2003–2005	Cats	31	(55)
2006–2011	Cheetahs	47	(35)
- Correct as of 19 April 2012
International career
Years	Team	Apps	(Points)
2003–2014	South Africa	70	(60)
- Correct as of 24 August 2014

Juanne Hugo Smith (born 30 July 1981) is a South African former professional rugby union player who represented South Africa in international test rugby, the Cheetahs in the Super Rugby competition, and the Free State Cheetahs in the Currie Cup. He mainly played as a blindside flanker, although he has also played number eight.

== Career ==
Smith made his international debut for South Africa on 7 June 2003 as a reserve in the 29–25 victory over Scotland at Kings Park Stadium in Durban. He was also named in the Springboks' team for the second Scottish Test the following week. He then played at number 8 during the 2003 Tri Nations Series against Australia and the All Blacks.

Smith was included in the Springboks squad for the 2003 Rugby World Cup in Australia. He played in four matches at the World Cup and scored a try in the match against Manu Samoa. Although he only played the one Test for South Africa during 2004 – against Wales at Millennium Stadium in Cardiff in November, he was capped 10 times for the Springboks the following season.

He was a reserve in matches against Uruguay and France, before being moving up into the starting line-up again as a flanker for the 2005 Tri Nations Series. The Free State Cheetahs made it to the 2005 Currie Cup final, where they defeated the Blue Bulls to win the championship. He then played in the 20–16 loss against France at Stade de France in Paris.

The Cheetahs gained entrance into the Super 14, and competed in the 2006 season. Smith captained the side, which ended up doing remarkably well for a new team, and the Cheetahs finished above the other new team, the Western Force, as well as three other Super 14 teams. He played in the 2006 mid-year rugby tests wins over Scotland, as well as the loss against France in South Africa, then being named in the Springboks' 2006 Tri Nations Series squad.

Smith was a key part of the World Cup-winning team to lift the Webb Ellis trophy in 2007. Although Smith wears the number seven on the back of his shirt, implying that he is an open side flanker, he is actually a blindside flanker, as the custom in South Africa is for openside to wear the number six rather than seven. Renowned for his strong ball carrying, Smith is one of the best blindside flankers in the world.

On 25 February 2011, in a Super Rugby match against the Bulls in Bloemfontein, Smith tore his Achilles tendon, which caused him to miss the rest of the 2011 Super Rugby season, as well as the Tri Nations and the 2011 Rugby World Cup.

In April 2012, Smith announced that he would be taking an indefinite break from rugby due to the ongoing battle with his Achilles injury. He had had four operations on the injury but was concerned that the recovery was taking longer than he had hoped. "The right thing to do now is to give my injury sufficient time to heal 100%," Smith said in an interview with the Volksblad newspaper.

Despite making his long-awaited comeback for the Cheetahs playing against the Bulls in a pre-season game in February 2013, the results of a subsequent MRI scan forced Smith to announce his retirement from the game.

On 10 September 2013 it was announced that Smith had been persuaded to come out of retirement and had signed a deal with RC Toulonnais.

Smith's 2013 season return to rugby resembles a fairytale story. Returning from a career ending injury to an unprecedentedly successful season, Toulon won the Heineken Cup, becoming only the third team ever to retain the title. On 24 May 2014, Smith scored the decisive try in the 60th minute of the final against Saracens. He also played a crucial part in the final of the French Top 14 a week later on 31 May 2014, in which Toulon defeated Castres Olympique to win the title for the first time since 1992. Subsequently, and capping a remarkable comeback year, on 6 August 2014, Smith was recalled to the Springboks team for the Rugby Championship against New Zealand, Australia and Argentina. In 2015 Smith again won the European Rugby Champions Cup with Toulon.

Smith then had a short stint in Japan with Toyota Verblitz, but left citing family reasons, and retired from all rugby in 2017.

== Honours ==
South Africa Under-21

- World Cup: 2002

Free State Cheetahs

- Currie Cup: 2005

South Africa

- World Cup: 2007
- Tri-Nations: 2009
- Lions Series: 2009

Toulon

- Heineken Cup European Champions/European Rugby Champions Cup: 2014, 2015
- Top 14 French League: 2014
