= Scott Fava =

Australia international rugby union player

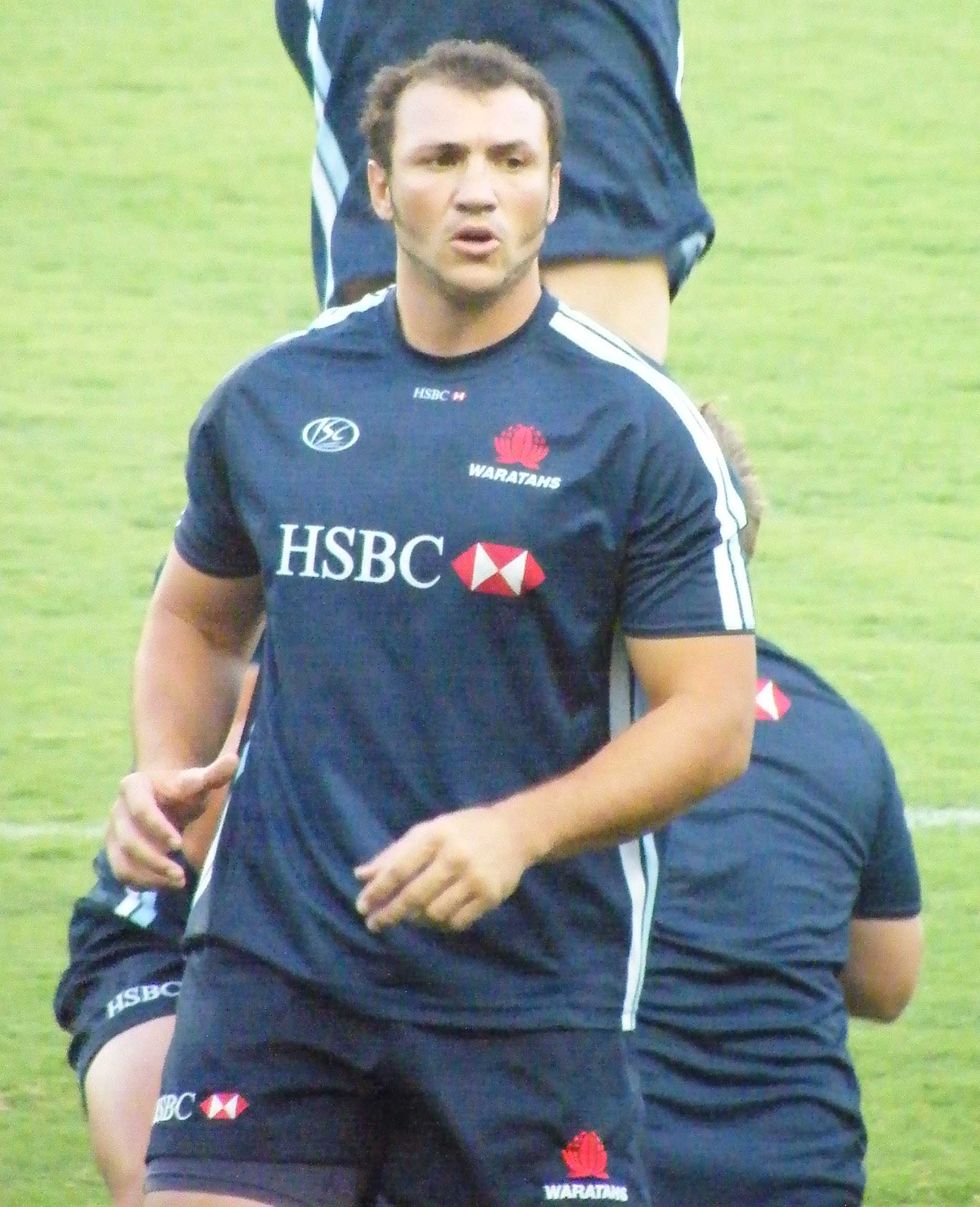
- Born: Scott Fava; 19 January 1976 (age 50) Kiama, New South Wales, Australia
- Height: 1.89 m (6 ft 2 1/2 in)
- Weight: 103 kg (16 st 3 lb)
- University: University of Canberra

Rugby union career
- Position: Number Eight
Provincial / State sides
Years	Team	Apps	(Points)
- Eastwood
-	Perth Spirit		
-	Associates		
Super Rugby
Years	Team	Apps	(Points)
1999–2001	Reds	5	(0)
2001–06	Brumbies	51	(30)
2006–08	Force	18	(10)
2009	Waratahs	0	(0)
International career
Years	Team	Apps	(Points)
2005–06	Australia	5	(5)
National sevens team
Years	Team		Comps
- Australia 7s

Scott Fava (born 19 January 1976 in Kiama, Australia) is an Australian retired rugby union footballer.

== Super 14 ==
Scott Fava began his Super Rugby career with the Queensland Reds in 1999, playing for three seasons before moving on to the ACT Brumbies. At the Brumbies, Fava was named Best Forward in 2004.

For the 2006 season, Fava joined the new Western Force side which was part of the expansion of the Super 12 to become the Super 14. During the season, Fava was relegated to the bench after failing a club alcohol breath test. Fava made 87 appearances in Super Rugby.

He later became the first person to play for all Australian Super 14 sides when he joined the Waratahs. He later retired due to injury after the 2009 season.

Fava played for Eastwood and became the first person to win the Ken Catchpole Medal three times, being voted the most outstanding player in the Sydney club competition in 2002, 2003 and 2004.

== Tests ==
Fava made his test debut for the Wallabies against England in 2005 and was also part of the tour party in France. He scored his first test try in the 2006 Tri Nations-Bledisloe Cup tie against the All Blacks.

== Commonwealth games ==
Scott Fava was a member of the Australian Rugby 7's side at the 2006 Commonwealth Games that lost out in the bronze medal playoff against Fiji. During the match, Fava suffered a sickening hit in a collision with Viliame Satala and began convulsing on the field. He was able to make a full recovery after being taken to the Royal Melbourne Hospital.
