= Doug Howlett =

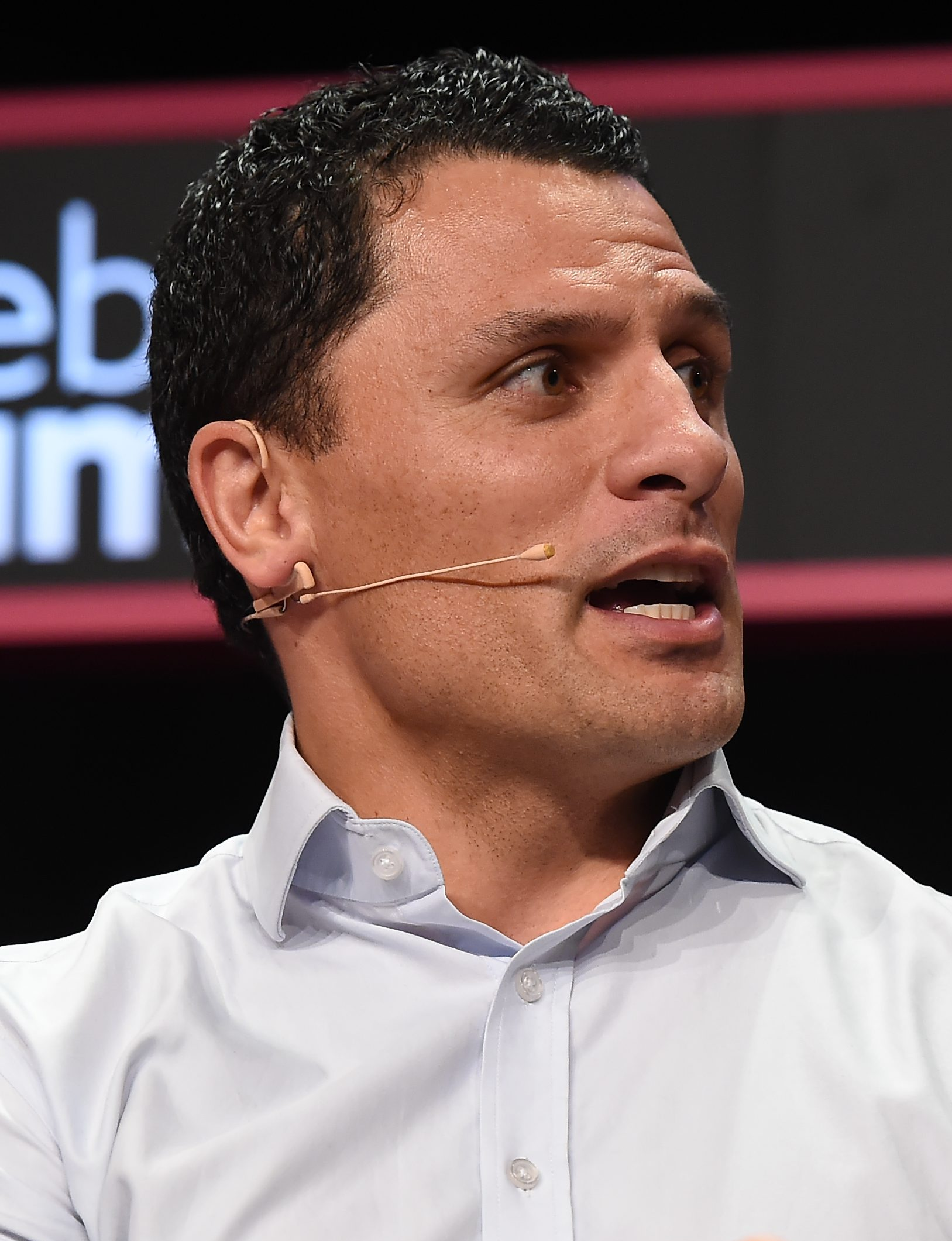
- Howlett in Dublin, Ireland, 2015
- Full name: Douglas Charles Howlett
- Born: 21 September 1978 (age 48) Auckland, New Zealand
- Height: 185 cm (6 ft 1 in)
- Weight: 93 kg (205 lb; 14 st 9 lb)
- School: Auckland Grammar School

Rugby union career
- Position(s): Wing, Fullback
Senior career
Years	Team	Apps	(Points)
1996–2007	Auckland	55	(245)
1997	Highlanders	2	(15)
1998	Hurricanes	5	(5)
1999–2007	Blues	97	(275)
2008–2013	Munster	112	(175)
- Correct as of 22 June 2019
International career
Years	Team	Apps	(Points)
1997–1999	New Zealand U21	13	(70)
2000–2007	New Zealand	63	(245)
- Correct as of 22 June 2019

Douglas Charles Howlett (born 21 September 1978) is a retired New Zealand professional rugby union player. He was primarily a wing, but he also sometimes played as a fullback.

He played for Auckland, and the Highlanders, Hurricanes and Blues in Super Rugby. He finished his career with Munster in Ireland.

With 49 tries in 62 tests, Howlett is the joint ninth-highest try scorer in rugby union history and the third top try scorer for New Zealand. He scored his 49th and final international try against Romania on September 8, 2007, during the Rugby World Cup in Marseille.

== Early life ==
Born in Auckland, New Zealand, Howlett attended May Road School and Mt Roskill Intermediate School. He started playing rugby at Auckland Grammar School, where he was also a star sprinter, captain of athletics and, during his final year in 1996, Head Prefect. He calls upon his speed as a sprinter (he once clocked a personal best 10.94 seconds for the 100 metres in an under 20 athletics championship in 1998) to great effect in his rugby career.

== Playing career ==
Howlett made his first-class debut at the age of 18 for Auckland in the Air New Zealand Cup. He has played with three Super Rugby teams, briefly with the Otago Highlanders and Wellington Hurricanes and, for the majority of his career in his home city, the Auckland Blues. It was with his hometown Blues that he established himself as one of the finest back players in the world, winning a Super 12 title in 2003. Throughout his domestic career, he remained affiliated with Auckland in the Air New Zealand Cup, with more than 50 appearances for the union.

=== Barbarians ===
In May 2009, Howlett was named in the Barbarians squad to play England and Australia.

=== Munster ===
On 30 August 2007, Howlett signed for Munster, following in the footsteps of another All Black great, Christian Cullen. Howlett joined Munster at the start of 2008. He made his debut for Munster in the Heineken Cup against ASM Clermont Auvergne, notably starting the movement for Lifeimi Mafi's try. His second match came against London Wasps where he notably dived to save the ball in the build-up to Denis Leamy's try. He scored his first Munster try against Ulster on 22 March 2008.

On 24 May 2008, Howlett was part of the Munster team that beat Toulouse 16–13 to win the 2007–08 Heineken Cup. Howlett had won his first cup with Munster only five and a half months into his career in the Northern Hemisphere. Howlett himself scored a try in the final only for it to be disallowed due to a forward pass from Rua Tipoki.

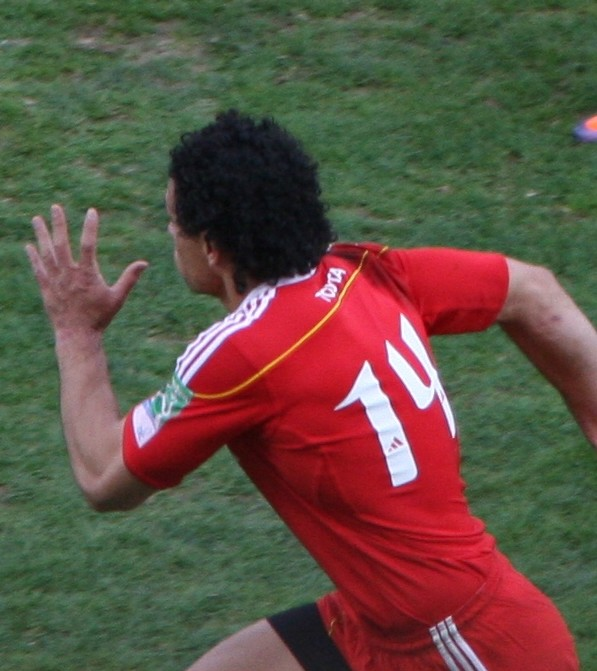
Howlett during a match against Northampton Saints, April 2010

Howlett joins Rod Kafer and Brad Thorn in having won major rugby tournaments in both the southern and northern hemispheres, the Super 14 and Heineken Cup respectively. He enjoyed his success with the Auckland Blues in the 2003 Super 12 and Munster in 2008. With Munster winning the Magners League title for the 08–09 season, Howlett held both a Heineken Cup and Magners League medal in the space of just two seasons with Munster. On 26 February 2010 it was announced Howlett had signed a contract to stay on at Munster until the end of the 2010–11 season, with the option for a further year. That option was confirmed by Munster in February 2011, and he began the 2011/2012. But in December 2011, Howlett picked up an Achilles tendon injury in a Pro 12 game against Ospreys which ruled him out for the rest of the season.

On 24 February 2012, Munster announced that Howlett had extended his contract until the end of the 2012–13 season. On 24 August 2012, it was announced that Howlett would take over from Paul O'Connell as the Munster squad captain for the 2012–13 season. He underwent successful knee surgery in late January 2013, and returned to action after the surgery on 2 March 2013. On 14 May 2013, it was confirmed that Howlett, after receiving medical advice, would retire from rugby due to a shoulder injury he sustained playing against Glasgow Warriors in March 2013.

Howlett returned to the province as a corporate ambassador in December 2013. He went on to become Munster's head of commercial and marketing, before returning to New Zealand in the autumn of 2019.

=== International ===
Howlett debuted for the All Blacks on 16 June 2000. In his career, he scored on average 4 points per game (155 from his first 38). He was also a first choice winger in the 2003 World Cup.

Howlett scored 49 tries for the All Blacks, a team record. His hat-trick against Italy on 8 September 2007, at the 2007 Rugby World Cup, brought him level with the record of Christian Cullen, the All Blacks' previous leading try scorer and then his try in the 15th minute against Scotland on 23 September gave him the record, which as of October 2026 is held by Will Jordan with 56 tries.

He was selected for the Rugby World Cup squad ahead of Canterbury and Tasman player Rico Gear; however, he was expected to play the first three rounds of the 2007 Air New Zealand Cup. He scored a hat trick in Auckland's victory over Counties Manukau in the first round, and on 11 August against Waikato he scored two, bringing his try total for Auckland to 50. Howlett was known as a winger with a high work rate and strong defensive tackling ability.

== Personal ==
Howlett is the brother of former Tongan rugby league international Phil Howlett.

On 22 February 2007 Howlett launched "The Doug Howlett Outreach Foundation" to support New Zealand children between the ages of 8 and 14 who demonstrated academic and sporting ability, initially in the codes of rugby union, rugby league, and netball. It was intended to assist with school and sports fees and sporting equipment. Scholarships and equipment were distributed in 2007 and 2008. The Foundation website is now offline and it appears defunct.

In May 2019, Howlett announced his decision to leave his role as Munster Rugby's Head of Commercial and Marketing after 6 years to return to New Zealand with his family.

== Controversies ==
Howlett was arrested on 9 October 2007 outside Heathrow Airport's Hilton Hotel on suspicion of criminal damage to two cars. This followed the All Blacks' World Cup loss in Cardiff to France a few days earlier, a game in which Howlett did not play. Howlett subsequently issued an apology through the media.

He was again arrested on 23 December 2010 on suspicion of being drunk and disorderly after his team's Christmas party in Kilkenny city.

== Honours ==
Blues

- Super Rugby Title: 2003 (1)

Auckland

- Ranfurly Shield Holder
- National Provincial Championship: 1996, 1999, 2002, 2003, 2005, 2007 (6)

=== Munster ===
- European Champions Cup: 2007–08 (1)
- Celtic League: 2008–09, 2010–11 (2)

=== New Zealand ===
- Rugby Championship: 2002, 2003, 2005, 2006, 2007 (5)
