= Gerhard Steyn =

South African singer

- Born: Gerhard Pieter Steyn; 27 November 1976 (age 49); South Africa
- Genres: Pop
- Occupation: Singer
- Label: VONK
- Formerly of: Windpomp
- Website: www.gerhardsteyn.co.za

Gerhard Pieter Steyn (born November 27, 1976) is a South African Afrikaans singer, songwriter and guitarist.

Gerhard made his debut in 2000 performing alongside Lianne Heyl, better known as Boeboe. Thereafter he formed part of the duo Windpomp with co-producer, bassist, guitarist and music-arranger, Naas de Jager.

Gerhard's first solo album Teen die Berg debuted in 2004, followed by Sestien Songs in 2006 and Breekbaar in 2008. It was with that album that gained him fame with hugely popular hits like "Baby Tjoklits", "Sexy Jeans", "Pennies en Ponde" and "Breekbaar". His 4th album, Als begin eers nou. He has been signed to VONK South African label. He was also named "VONK songwriter of the year".

In 2009, his own song "Baby Tjoklits" won the 2009 "VONK song of the year". It was also voted Radio Rippel listeners as "Song of 2009".

He also did some freelance journalism for Vonk Magazine. As songwriter he has worked with Dozi, Jacques de Koning, Robbie Klay, Karin Ferreira, Annel Botha and Rudi Muller and produced artist Annel Botha and others.

Other than singing, he's also a songwriter, Besides his singing career, he has done voice-overs and acting. In 2015, he appeared in the role of Will Olwage in the film Forsaken directed by Willie Olwage.

== Personal life ==
In 2013, he married Zelri Enslin, the daughter of George Enslin, the first long-running drummer in Steyn's band and Mathilda Enslin, his manager and he has two daughters named Zardi (born 2016) Zaniq (born 2019).

== Discography ==
=== Albums ===
- 2004: Teen Die Berg [VONK/RMD]
- 2006: Sestien Songs [VONK/RMD]
- 2008: Breekbaar [VONK]
- 2010: Als begin eers nou [VONK]
- 2011: Tien van Harte [VONK]
- 2013: Brood en Melk
- 2013: Nuwe Krag
- 2014: Liefdesoorlog
- 2015: Afrikaanse Meisies
- 2016: Hartvanger

Compilation album

- 2008: 17 Songs op 17 Mei [VONK]

== Singles / Videography ==
(selective)

- 2007: "Plaas kinders"
- 2008: "Pennies en ponde"
- 2009: "Baby Tjoklits"
- 2009: "Sexy Jeans (Saterdagaand)"
- 2011: "Sexy vere"
- 2011: "Dimpels"
- 2011: "Spore in die lug"
- 2011: "Rooi Roos" (with Nadine)
- 2011: "Stealing Stars"
- 2012: "Jy's my hartklop"
- 2012: "Tussen Treine" (with Richard van der Westhuizen)
- 2013: "Parfuum"
- 2014: "Wie't gesê Liefde's Blind" (with Anais)
- 2014: "Een man army"
- 2015: "Bosveldbloed" (with Richard van der Westhuizen)
- 2015: "Liefdesoorlog" (with Anais, featuring Just You Artists)
- 2015: "Afrikaanse meisies"
- 2015: "Verlief op 'n dief"

== See also ==
- List of South African musicians
