= Albert van den Berg (rugby union) =

South African rugby union player

- Full name: Philippus Albertus van den Berg
- Born: 26 January 1974 (age 52) Hoopstad, South Africa
- Height: 2.01 m (6 ft 7 in)
- Weight: 107 kg (16 st 12 lb; 236 lb)
- School: Vryburg High School

Rugby union career
- Position: Lock
Senior career
Years	Team	Apps	(Points)
	Vaal Triangle	15	(10)
1997–1999	Griquas	55	(120)
1999	Cats	7	(10)
2000–2009	Sharks	95	(60)
2000–2009	Sharks (Currie Cup)	47	(85)
2009–2013	Canon Eagles		
- Correct as of 8 January 2017
International career
Years	Team	Apps	(Points)
1999–2007	South Africa	51	(20)
- Correct as of 8 January 2017
Coaching career
- Years: Team
- 2013–?: Canon Eagles (assistant coach)
- 2023–: Scarlets (forwards coach)

Philippus Albertus van den Berg (born 26 January 1974) is a South African former professional rugby union rugby player who played for the South Africa national rugby union team, the Springboks. His usual position was at lock. He also played for the Sharks in the international Super 14 competition. He is currently the forwards coach for Welsh professional rugby union club Scarlets.

He made his international debut for South Africa on 12 June 1999 in a test match against Italy at EPRFU Stadium in Port Elizabeth. The Springboks won the match 74 points to three. He played in the subsequent match against Italy, though he started at lock in the second test. He then played in two matches during the 1999 Tri Nations Series, against the New Zealand national rugby union team at Loftus Versfeld in Pretoria, which South Africa lost, and a match against Australia at Newlands in Cape Town, which South Africa won by one point, 10 to nine.

He was then selected in South Africa's 1999 Rugby World Cup squad for Wales. He played in five matches for the Springboks during the tournament, including scoring two tries in the 39 to three win over Uruguay during the pool stages. The following season he moved from the Griquas to the Sharks.

He was selected to play in the 2000 Tri Nations Series, in which he played in five of South Africa's matches during the tournament. He earned another four caps at the end of the year, playing tests against Argentina at River Plate Stadium, Ireland at Lansdowne Road, Wales at Millennium Stadium and England at Twickenham.

In 2001, he played in two mid-year tests against France in South Africa, and was subsequently a reserve for two matches during the 2001 Tri Nations Series. He earned one other cap that year, against the United States in Houston.

He next played for the national team in 2004, as lock against the All Blacks in the 21 to 23 loss at Jade Stadium during the 2004 Tri Nations Series. The following year he scored two tries in a match against Uruguay as well as playing another eight test matches for the Sprigboks. After playing in a 2006 mid-year test against Scotland, he was named in the 2006 Tri Nations Series squad.

== Honours ==
- 2008 Currie Cup winner (Sharks)
- 2004 Tri-Nations winner (Springboks)
- 2007 Rugby World Cup winner
