= Rico Gear =

New Zealand international rugby union player

- Born: Rico Levi Gear; 26 February 1978 (age 48) Gisborne, New Zealand
- Height: 179 cm (5 ft 10 in)
- Weight: 92 kg (14 st 7 lb; 203 lb)
- School: Gisborne Boys' High School
- Notable relative: Hosea Gear (brother)

Rugby union career
- Position(s): Wing, Centre, Fullback
Senior career
Years	Team	Apps	(Points)
1997, 2014–2016	Poverty Bay	17	(40)
1998–1999	Auckland	6	(10)
1999, 2002–2004	Blues	35	(45)
2000	Highlanders	4	(5)
2000	Bay of Plenty	10	(30)
2001, 2005–2007	Crusaders	40	(150)
2001–2004	North Harbour	24	(65)
2005–2007	Nelson Bays	4	(15)
2005	Tasman	3	(10)
2006	Canterbury	10	(25)
2007	Worcester	66	(90)
2007–2010	Kintetsu Liners	47	(90)
2021	Ngati Porou East Coast	1	(0)
- Correct as of 4 November 2021
International career
Years	Team	Apps	(Points)
1998–1999	New Zealand Colts	7	(25)
2002–2005	New Zealand Māori	10	(20)
2003	New Zealand Barbarians	1	(0)
2004–2007	New Zealand	20	(65)
2007	Junior All Blacks	2	(15)
2008	Barbarian F.C.	1	(0)
National sevens team
Years	Team		Comps
1998	New Zealand 7s		
Medal record
Men's rugby sevens
Representing New Zealand
Commonwealth Games
Gold medal – first place	1998 Kuala Lumpur	Team competition

Rico Levi Gear (born 26 February 1978) is a former New Zealand rugby union player. He was a specialist right wing but also covered midfield positions.

He is the older brother of New Zealand winger Hosea Gear

== Club career ==
Gear was educated at Gisborne Boys' High. As a young man Gear also played for the Tolaga Bay rugby union club just outside Gisborne. In 1990 Gear played for the Gisborne East Coast under 13 rugby league team. He also studied anthropology at Massey University with an emphasis on Māoridom and Māori language for two years.

Gear made his provincial debut in 1997, playing for Poverty Bay against King Country. He has since played for provincial sides; Auckland, Bay of Plenty, North Harbour and Nelson Bays.

He made his Super 12 debut for the Auckland Blues in 1999 against the Queensland Reds. He also had a stint with the Highlanders, however his career really ignited when he went to the Crusaders at the end of the 2004 season.

Gear played every game in the 2005 season, for the Crusaders, and he scored 15 times for the 2005 champions. He was also named Rebel Sport Super 12 player of the Year and the Tom French Memorial Māori Player of the Year.

He was first choice right wing for the Crusaders in the 2006 Super 14 season. Gear has a younger brother Hosea Gear who played wing for the Chiefs.

In June 2007 Gear was signed by Guinness Premiership side Worcester Warriors. Gear was regarded as one of the most dangerous and clinical wingers in world rugby and carved up defenses in the Guinness Premiership during the 2008/09 campaign.

He became one of the biggest signings in the club's long history after agreeing a three-year deal that kept him at Sixways until 2010.

Gear started his Warriors career with four tries in a match on his full debut – equalling the competition record – as Warriors punished Gran Parma and he continued to rack up the tries.

He scored one of the most memorable individual tries ever seen at Sixways Stadium with his solo stunner against Bucuresti and also scored a breathtaking one-handed effort against Harlequins at The Stoop.

Despite being hit by a number of injuries towards the end of the campaign, Gear still finished the season with a staggering record of 12 tries in only 19 appearances for the club and vowing he would show his real form in the 2008/09 term. After Worcester Warriors got relegated after the 2009–2010 season, he signed with Japanese Top League team Kintetsu Liners in April 2010.

== International career ==
Gear made his international debut on 10 July 2004 in a match against the Pacific Islanders, where he also scored a try. He went on to play in numerous matches against the British & Irish Lions in their 2005 tour of New Zealand. He scored his first All Blacks hat-trick against Wales at the Millennium Stadium in 2005. He also played in the 2006 Tri Nations.

He won a Commonwealth Games gold medal when he was part of the New Zealand Sevens side and also has World Cup Sevens medals.

In spite of appearances in the All Blacks in the 2007 season, Gear was omitted from the Rugby World Cup squad, announced on 22 July 2007. Doug Howlett was selected in his place.

In all he scored 11 tries in 19 tests for the All Blacks including a hat trick against Wales at Cardiff and two against Scotland on the same tour.

== Post rugby career ==
When he was recruited for season 2 of Match Fit as the youngest and fittest recruit, but has battled asthma all his life. He had lived in Gold Coast, Australia as a schoolboy coach, and married with Australian wife, Rebecca Miles, who was a professional basketball player, and 2 children, Isaiah and Ava. The family still reside on the Gold Coast in 2023. On episode 3, Rico, as the only other fluent Maori speaker, was forced into lead the Classic All Blacks to reply in traditional Powhiri as Glenn Osbourne and Piri Weepu, along with non-speaker Daniel Braid, failed to return in time as pig and deer hunters.

Awards
Preceded by Carl Hayman	Tom French Memorial; Māori rugby union player of the year 2005	Succeeded by Carl Hayman
