= Lachlan MacKay =

- Full name: Lachlan James MacKay
- Born: 30 November 1982 (age 43) Sydney, Australia
- Height: 6 ft 2 in (188 cm)
- Weight: 224 lb (102 kg)

Rugby union career
- Position: Centre / Fly-half
Senior career
Years	Team	Apps	(Points)
2005	NSW Waratahs		
2006–08	Western Force		
2008–10	CA Brive		
2010–11	Leeds Tykes		
International career
Years	Team	Apps	(Points)
2005	Australia	1	(0)

Lachlan James MacKay (born 30 November 1982) is an Australian former professional rugby union player.

Born and raised in Sydney, MacKay represented Australia at schoolboys level, the under-19s, under-21s and in rugby sevens, before starting his Super 12 career with New South Wales in 2005. He impressed enough in his first Super 12 season to be called up for the Wallabies and debuted in the 2005 Bledisloe Cup Test in Auckland, coming off the bench to replace Mat Rogers. In 2006, he joined the Western Force as a foundation player, but his time in Perth was beset by injuries. He left the Force in 2008 and played for French club CA Brive and then Leeds in England.

== See also ==
- List of Australia national rugby union players
