= Al Kanaar =

Australia international rugby union player

Alexander Kanaar
- Born: Alexander Kanaar; 4 March 1983 (age 43) Nowra, New South Wales
- Height: 195 cm (6 ft 5 in)
- Weight: 112 kg (247 lb; 17 st 9 lb)

Rugby union career
- Position: Lock / Flanker
Provincial / State sides
Years	Team	Apps	(Points)
–	Sydney University	30	(20)
Super Rugby
Years	Team	Apps	(Points)
2005–2008	Waratahs	26	(5)
- Correct as of 2007-10-06
International career
Years	Team	Apps	(Points)
2005	Australia	1	(0)
- Correct as of 2007-10-06

Alexander "Al" Kanaar (born 4 March 1983) is a former Australian Rugby union footballer. Kanaar played as a lock and a flanker for the New South Wales Waratahs. Kanaar made 26 appearances for NSW and was capped once for the Wallabies, against the All Blacks at Eden Park in 2005. He was forced to retire before the 2008 season started due to a chronic knee injury. Al Kanaar is now the purple cap age group manager at Gerringong SLSC nippers. Al finished in seventh place in the swim at the Gerringong SLSC club champs before a sixth-place finish in the Taplin Relay at the 2020 Branch Championships.
