= Carl Hayman =

New Zealand rugby union player

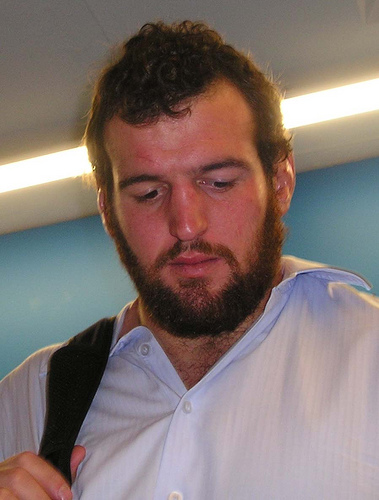
- Full name: Carl Joseph Hayman
- Born: 14 November 1979 (age 46) Ōpunake, New Zealand
- Height: 193 cm (6 ft 4 in)
- Weight: 120 kg (265 lb; 18 st 13 lb)
- School: King's High School

Rugby union career
- Position: Prop
Senior career
| Years | Team | Apps | (Points) |
| 1998–2006 | Otago | 68 | (5) |
| 1999–2007 | Highlanders | 81 | (15) |
| 2007–2010 | Newcastle Falcons | 64 | (10) |
| 2010–2015 | Toulon | 156 | (0) |
- Correct as of 22 June 2019
International career
| Years | Team | Apps | (Points) |
| 1998–2000 | New Zealand U21 | 12 | (0) |
| 2000 | New Zealand A | 4 | (0) |
| 2001–2007 | New Zealand | 46 | (10) |
| 2002–2005 | New Zealand Māori | 10 | (0) |
- Correct as of 22 June 2019
Coaching career
- Years: Team
- 2016–2019: Pau (assistant)
- Correct as of 22 June 2019

Carl Joseph Hayman (born 14 November 1979) is a retired New Zealand rugby union footballer who played at tighthead prop.

Hayman played for the Highlanders in Super Rugby, Otago in the NPC, and Newcastle Falcons in the English Premiership, and made 45 appearances for New Zealand at international level. Hayman retired from professional rugby in January 2015, aged 35. Since retiring Hayman has been diagnosed with early-onset dementia and probable chronic traumatic encephalopathy.

== Career ==
He became the 1000th All Black when he made his debut against Samoa in 2001. In 2005, Hayman played for the New Zealand Māori, against Fiji in Suva and against the British & Irish Lions in Hamilton. On 19 April 2007 it was announced that Hayman had signed a three-year contract with English Premiership club Newcastle Falcons, turning down an offer from league champions Sale Sharks to do so.

On 22 March 2010, it was announced that Hayman would join French club Toulon at the end of the season. He became one of a number of high-profile players that signed for Toulon alongside Jonny Wilkinson, Juan Martín Fernández Lobbe, Felipe Contepomi and Joe Van Niekerk. The decision to stay in Europe made him ineligible for the 2011 Rugby World Cup due to the New Zealand Rugby Union's policy of only selecting players who have played in the New Zealand domestic competition.

In 2010, he was selected in the Barbarians squad to play Tonga on 26 November. In May 2013 he started as Toulon won the 2013 Heineken Cup Final by 16–15 against Clermont Auvergne.

On 6 January 2015, Hayman announced his retirement from professional rugby at the end of the 2014–15 Top 14 season.

== Dementia diagnosis ==
Hayman was diagnosed with dementia in July 2021. He cites his rugby career as being the leading cause to this condition, telling RNZ that he approximated he had "endured tens of thousands of minor concussions, not including years of training sessions" and that "it's the repetition of knocks to the head – not so much big concussions – that have done the damage here". Hayman has said that he was in denial about his diagnosis, and that he turned to alcohol in order to cope.

Hayman has joined a group of over 150 former sportspersons to lodge a class-action lawsuit against rugby and soccer governing bodies, alleging that the bodies had failed to protect players from early onset neurological conditions caused by sports related injuries. The bodies in question included World Rugby, Rugby Football Union, and the Welsh Rugby Union. The suit issued a number of claims, including claims that the governing bodies failed to educate players about the risk of brain damage and maintain the 21-day stand down period after concussions, and that their assessments during a match (assessments which the lawyers argued were five to ten minutes in duration) were inadequate. Other players involved in the lawsuit include former English rugby union player Steve Thompson, and former Wales player Alix Popham - both of whom have also been diagnosed with early onset dementia.

== Criminal conviction ==
In August 2024 Hayman pleaded guilty to three charges of posting an intimate visual recording without consent. He was sentenced to 18 months supervision and ordered to pay reparations.

== Publications ==
- Head On: An All Black's memoir of rugby, dementia, and the hidden cost of success, 2023, HarperCollins, IBSN 9781775492665

Awards
| Preceded by Carlos Spencer | Tom French Memorial; Māori rugby union player of the year 2004; 2006 | Succeeded by Rico Gear |
| Preceded by Rico Gear | Tom French Memorial; Māori rugby union player of the year 2004; 2006 | Succeeded by Daniel Braid |
