= Clyde Rathbone =

Australian rugby union player

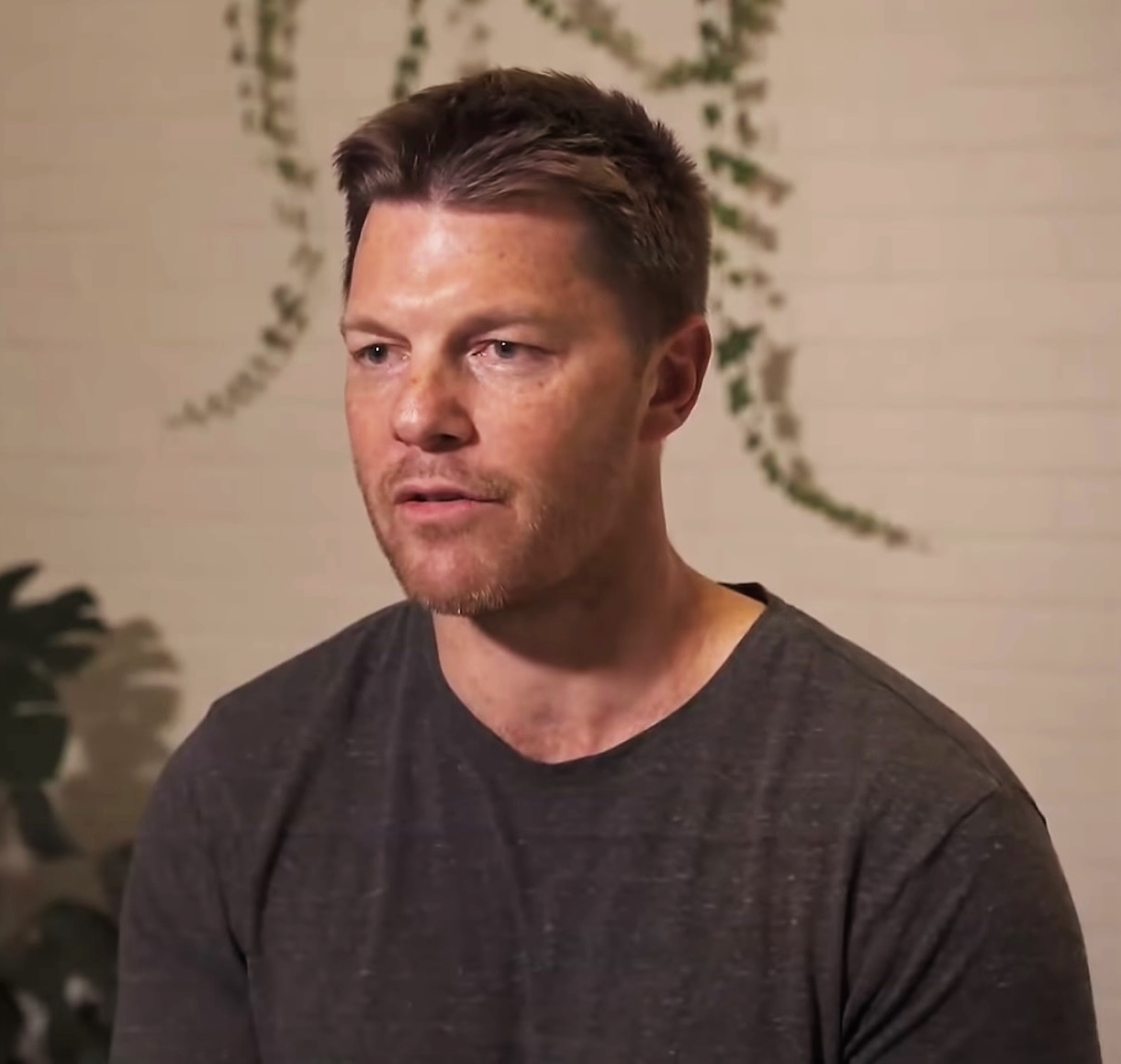
- Rathbone interviewed by Rebel Wisdom in 2019
- Born: Clyde Rathbone; 23 July 1981 (age 45) Durban, South Africa
- Height: 1.80 m (5 ft 11 in)
- Weight: 97 kg (15 st 4 lb)
- School: Kingsway High School
- University: SAIR Durban

Rugby union career
- Position: Centre
Super Rugby
Years	Team	Apps	(Points)
2002	Sharks	3	(0)
2003–09	Brumbies	49	(75)
2013–14	Brumbies	14	(15)
- Correct as of 27 July 2014
International career
Years	Team	Apps	(Points)
–2002	South Africa U21		
2004–06	Australia	26	(40)
- Correct as of 15:28, 24 June 2013 (UTC)

Clyde Rathbone (born 23 July 1981 in Durban, South Africa), nicknamed "Rattlebones", is an Australian retired rugby union player. He played for the Brumbies in Super Rugby. He also played internationally for Australia. He began his Australia career as a centre, and occasionally played wing.

== Career ==
He spent his entire childhood in Durban and played most of his rugby as a South African junior, representing South African Schools and even captaining the under-21 national team to victory in the 2002 U21 Rugby World Cup. In the same year, he made his debut in the then-Super 12 for the Sharks. However, at the end of 2002, he chose to move to Australia, for which he was qualified to play by having an Australian-born paternal grandmother.

Rathbone joined the Brumbies for the 2003 season. After considerable speculation in the rugby world over which country he would represent at Test level, he opted for the Wallabies, which resulted in Rathbone being heavily criticized in much of the South African press. Rathbone made his Test debut in June 2004 against Scotland, and went on to score a hat trick of tries against England the following week. His form in the June Tests earned him a starting wing position for that year's Tri Nations Series. During that competition, he rubbed salt into the South African wounds by scoring a match-winning try against his former countrymen in Perth. When the Wallabies went on tour that November, he scored a pair of tries against Scotland at Murrayfield, but suffered a groin injury that kept him out of the year's final Test against England.

In 2005, Rathbone was injured for most of the year, missing the Autumn series of Tests.

In 2006 Rathbone married to his longtime girlfriend in their hometown of Durban.

In 2008, after 15 months out of rugby due to knee surgery for a torn patellar tendon, Rathbone signed a Shute Shield contract with the east-Sydney-based team, Easts.

In 2009, he decided to retire after many injuries that have seen him sidelined.

On 23 August 2012, Rathbone announced his intention to return to professional Rugby after three years out of the game. Rathbone signed a one-year contract with his old club, the Brumbies, with an option to extend.

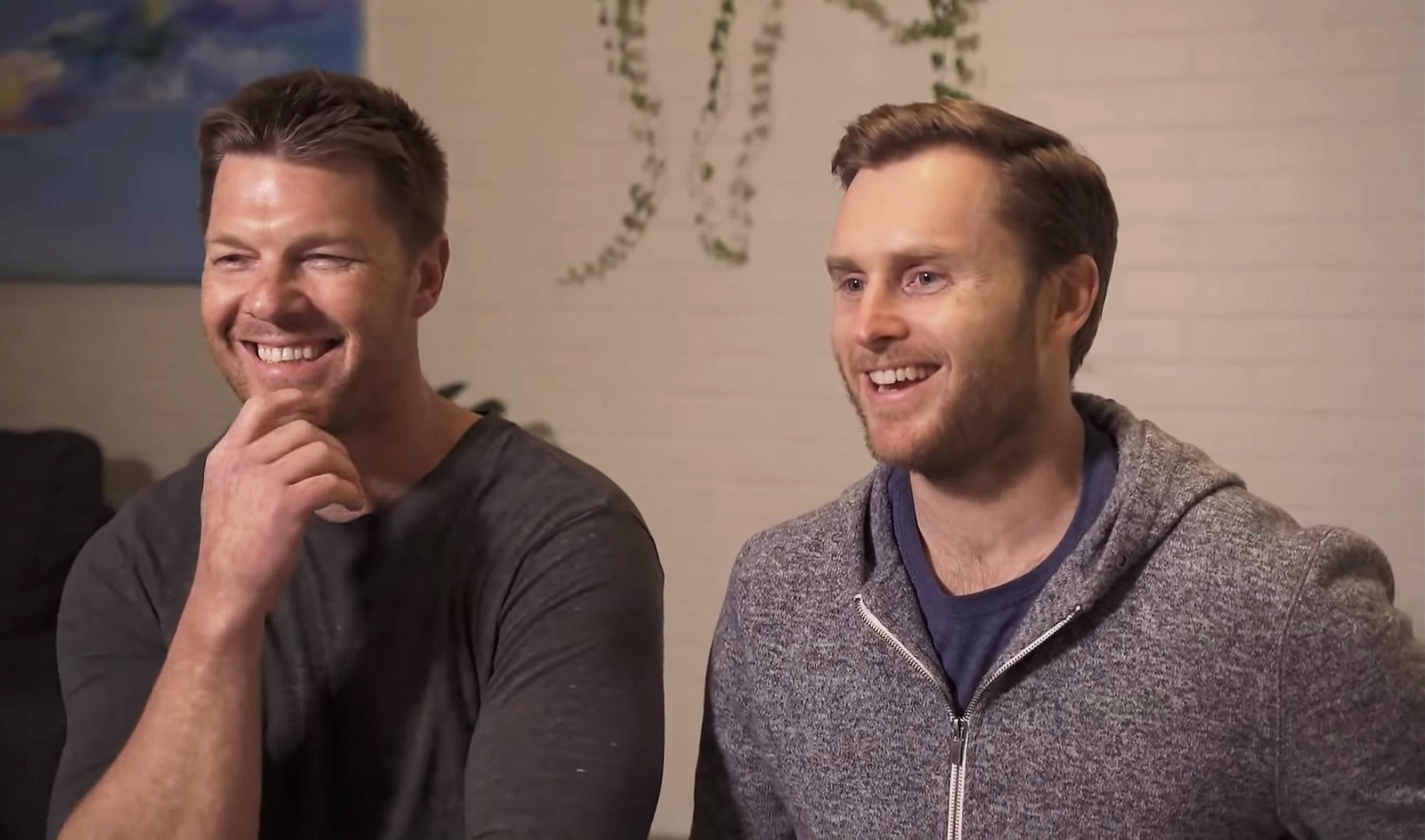
Brothers Clyde (left) and Dayne Rathbone interviewed on Rebel Wisdom in 2019

In 2016, Rathbone co-founded the social media network Letter.wiki with brother Dayne Rathbone. In 2021 Letter.wiki was acquired by media platform Substack.
