= Jake White =

South African rugby union coach

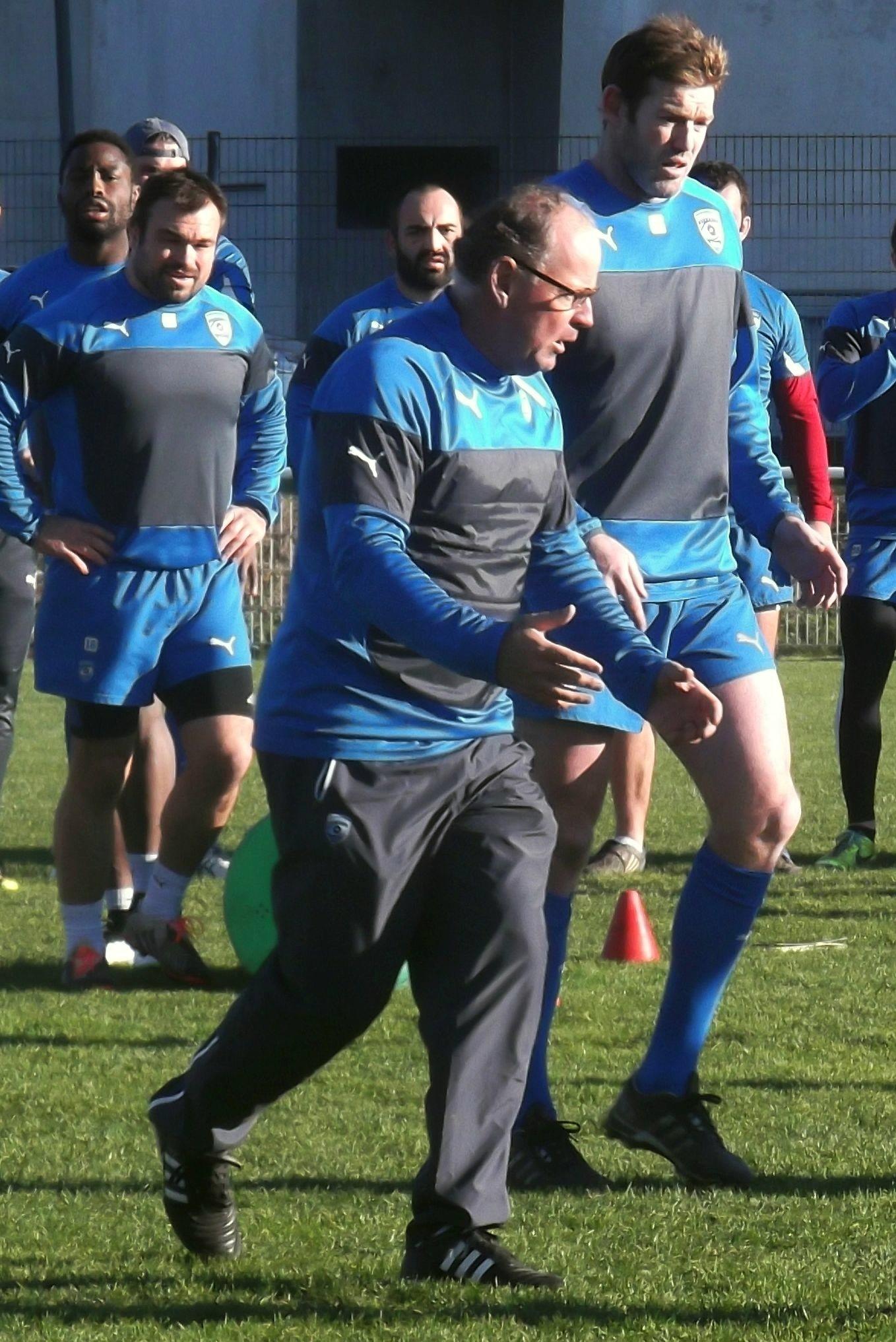
- White in 2014
- Born: Jacob Westerduin; 13 December 1963 (age 62) (Note: While the official South African Rugby Union website lists White's date of birth as 13 December 1963 – corroborated by websites like Eurosport and the BBC – several websites, such as ESPN list it as 19 March 1963.) Johannesburg, Transvaal, South Africa
- School: Jeppe High School for Boys

Rugby union career
Coaching career
- Years: Team
- 2002: South Africa U21
- 2004–2007: South Africa
- 2012–2013: Brumbies
- 2013–2014: Sharks
- 2014: Tonga (Technical Advisor)
- 2014–2017: Montpellier
- 2017–2020: Toyota Verblitz
- 2020–2025: Bulls
- 2026–: Fiji

Jacob Charles White (born 13 December 1963 as Jacob Westerduin) is a professional rugby union coach and former coach of the South African national team – the Springboks – whom he coached to victory in 2007 Rugby World Cup and the 2004 Tri Nations. White also coached the Under-21 Springbok side to victory in the Under-21 World Cup in 2002. He was coach of the Brumbies in the Super Rugby from 2012, but resigned with two years remaining on his contract in 2013 to return to South Africa. On returning to South Africa, he coached the Sharks for a single season, explaining he wanted to seek international opportunities. This arose in a technical role with the Tongan national team. After assisting Tonga in their 3 Test European Tour in 2014, White was announced as Montpellier's new boss, overseeing all coaching aspects for the club.

On 24 October 2011, he was inducted into the World Rugby Hall of Fame, alongside other World Cup-winning head coaches and captains through the 2007 World Cup.

== Coaching resume up to 2004 ==
Jake White was born in Johannesburg and attended Jeppe High School for Boys where he played in the First XV. He changed his surname to White when he was a teenager after his mother remarried. He began his coaching career as a high school rugby coach at Parktown Boys' High School's First XV before returning to his old school as a teacher and coach of the school's First XV. White's success with the school team resulted in him being appointed as provincial schools coach. He coached various under-19 and under-21 sides before assisting Springbok squad preparations by compiling video analysis for them. From 1997 to 1999 he was a technical advisor to Nick Mallet, being part of the 17 Test winning record by the Springboks. In 1999 he was the assistant coach to the U-21 Springboks, coached by Eric Sauls and captained by John Smit. While assistant coach of the U-21 they won the SANZAR tournament in Argentina, beating England, Ireland, Wales, Australia, France enroute to the finals and then beat New Zealand in the final. From 2000-2001 he was an assistant to Harry Viljoen at the Springboks. By this time he was well known for his technical prowess in rugby circles, and he lived up to his reputation by coaching the under-21 Springbok side to a victory in the U-21 Rugby Union World Cup in 2002.

== Springbok coach ==
White was appointed as head coach of the national team in early 2004 following South Africa's poor performance at the 2003 World Cup and the Kamp Staaldraad scandal. His first move was to install John Smit as captain, which drew a substantial amount of criticism, despite the success they achieved leading the Springboks.

=== 2004 ===
White started his Springbok coaching career with a 2–0 series win over Ireland, followed by wins over Wales and a combined Pacific Islanders team in the 2004 June rugby union tests. He then proceeded to coach South Africa to their first Tri-Nations trophy since 1998. Soon after the 2004 Tri Nations victory, White's contract was extended to after the 2007 Rugby World Cup.

In the November Internationals, South Africa attempted a Grand Slam, beating Wales and Scotland, but losing to Ireland and England. They concluded the Tour with a win over Argentina in Buenos Aires.

The Springbok resurgence was recognised with a sweep of the major International Rugby Board Awards. The Boks were named Team of the Year, White Coach of the Year, and flanker Schalk Burger Player of the Year.

=== 2005 ===
In the 2005 Tri Nations Series, the Springboks and All Blacks each won 3 tests, but New Zealand won the Championship on bonus points.

=== 2006 ===
The 2006 season started with a 36–16 win over a confident Scotland contingent. The Boks narrowly beat Scotland the following week as Springbok kingpin Schalk Burger suffered a career-threatening neck injury in the game. A loss to France in Cape Town left the side bereft of confidence ahead of a Tri-Nations opener against Australia. A member of the conditioning team stated that the Boks no longer felt they were in a comfort zone going into the Tri-Nations.

Perhaps the lowest point in Springbok history, alongside the 2002 drubbing at the hands of England; the Springboks were dealt a record defeat to Australia by 49 points to nil. The matched was marred by very inaccurate play, punctuated by flyhalf Jaco Van Der Westhyzen's purported 'drop kick' just outside his 22 after fumbling the ball. Larkham led his charges in exposing the Springboks defensive frailties and shattering any chance of a Bok revival.

A week later and the Boks put up a much stronger showing against New Zealand. Though the Boks frustrating ill-discipline allowed for the All Blacks to tally a total of seven penalties to pull away comfortably. Pressure and injuries were beginning to mount. The Boks gave New Zealand a real working over at the breakdown and dominated the All Black line-out throughout; but the aforementioned ill-discipline and Dan Carter were too much to contain in the end. Bakkies Botha injured his calf on the eve of this test requiring surgery and joined stalwart Schalk Burger as a long-term injury.

White rallied his troops in the Springboks' final match of their away tour in the newly expanded Tri-Nations. The Springboks looked set to seal their first win of the competition until a late try by Mat Rogers allowed for Mortlock to score the winning conversion. The loss splintered morale and soon political turmoil would engulf the team as Jake White's tenure was put into question. Supposed secret meetings in England and the issue of transformation put considerable strain on the team as a meeting with the powerful All Blacks loomed later in August. Numerous journalists in South Africa with strong ties to Cheeky Watson campaigned viciously for the removal of White. This a knee-jerk reaction to White's refusal to play Luke Watson and name him captain of the side.

Despite this brief reprieve the Boks seemed to undo their good work in the previous two tests in exhibiting yet another poor defensive display that harkened back to the 49–0 loss in their opening game. A burst of three tries inside ten minutes allowed New Zealand to dominate the game and confirm their status as the preeminent force in world rugby. A strong fightback by the Boks was not enough.

Backs firmly planted to the wall the Springboks were determined to end their campaign strongly. White seemed to find the right balance in the back row and the Boks defeated New Zealand at the Royal Bafokeng Stadium. The Boks rolled up to Ellis Park the following week to right the wrongs of their loss to Australia in their final away match. The standout feature of this match was the manner in which Solly Tyibilika outplayed his opposite George Smith – regarded by many as the greatest fetcher of his era.

With back-to-back wins over their Tri-Nations rivals White decided to rest the remainder of his front line players for the up-coming End of Year Tour. They started their campaign against Ireland in celebration of 100 years of Bok rugby. The Irish however had other ideas and put away three tries that exposed the poor defence of Pierre Spies in particular and Bryan Habana out of position at 13. Spies was twice caught charging out of the line and the Irish swiftly punished that opening each time. The Springboks, fielding a largely experimental side, fought hard as Habana and debutant François Steyn dotted down in the second half. That comeback was roundly ended by Horgan after O'Driscoll expertly put him away to seal the game.

Next up was a two test encounter against England at fortress Twickenham. The Springboks had not beaten England since the Spring Tour of 2000 where the Boks won 18–13. England exacted revenge a week later and had built a period of dominance spanning six years. The Boks had not won at Twickenham since 1997; leaving the Boks with a nine-year hoodoo to break. The Boks dominated England for much of the first test and seemed certain of victory until a late try by Phil Vickery gave England the result. A key turning point in the game was the injury to Butch James. His replacement, André Pretorius failed to deliver the steadiness Butch provided and missed an important penalty. However, the Boks gained confidence from this display and relished their second chance to redeem themselves.

Unlike the first test, England got off to a strong start with attacks that left the Boks defending for most of the first 30 minutes. In fact, it wasn't until the 26th minute that the Boks launched their first serious attack started by nuggety scrumhalf Ricky Januarie. England finally scored on the half-hour mark, but a missed conversion signalled the end of their dominance. The Boks got to work dominating the English with bruising defence, tactical kicks and set piece superiority. Burly prop CJ Van Der Linde punctuating the Bok's dominance in brushing aside two defenders as he burst his way through England's defensive line and dotting down for a crucial score. André Pretorius nailed three drop-goals which left the English on the ropes. The curse of the Red Rose was final lifted in arguably the most important victory of the 2006 campaign. The result unfortunately ended the tenure of Andy Robinson as England dubiously replaced him with Brian Ashton. White managed to stave off his critics and end what was an emotionally exhausting season.

This was a year of growth as much as it was a disappointing lost opportunity. Injuries to Schalk Burger (broken neck), Bakkies Botha (calf surgery), Jean De Villiers (cracked rib), Bryan Habana (cracked rib), Butch James (groin and knee), André Pretorius (groin), Joe Van Niekerk (C5 & C6 vertebrae), Jacques Cronje (cracked rib), Danie Rossouw (hamstring), Juan Smith (left quadriceps), Eddie Andrews (back), BJ Botha (back surgery), CJ Van Der Linde (Leg), Gurthro Steenkamp (broken hand), Pedrie Wannenburg (wrist surgery), Marius Joubert (fractured hand) among other lesser injuries stretched the Bok's depth to its limit. This allowed the Boks to break their reliance on certain individuals and expand their depth in new players and testing new combinations. François Steyn was the find of the season alongside the elusive Ruan Pienaar. White also found depth in Wynand Olivier and Pierre Spies; the former being used extensively in plugging gaps left by injuries in the backline. White lamented the many lost opportunities of this campaign but was optimistic about the various changes they made to their defensive patterns and saw it as an important learning curve ahead of the World Cup the following year.

=== 2007: World Champions and "Resignation" ===
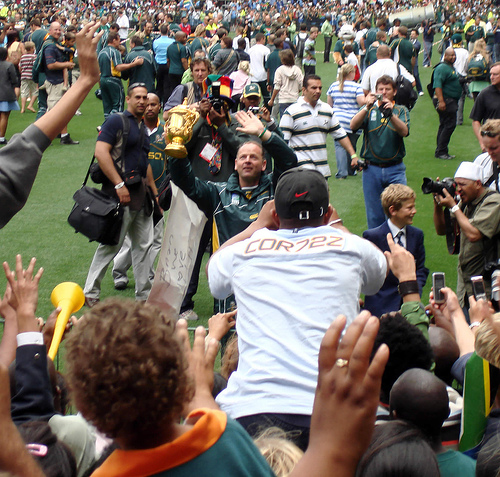
Jake White with the William Webb Ellis Cup (2007)

The Springboks could not have started their campaign any better as they utterly demolished England in back-to-back tests. Again, this being very important in the context of their World Cup campaign, as they faced the World Champions in the same group. England must however be credited for their resolve in the second test where a Jonny Wilkinson led side actually led the game at half-time. South Africa were guilty of sloppy play in the opening 40 minutes which was met by stern midfield defence by the English. A powerful scrum aided England in securing a measure of dominance. Fresh from the break however South Africa stepped up and rampantly tore into their guests. This culminated in two 50 pointers in as many weeks. The fans suddenly began to believe in their side again. Then came more political meddlings to sour the mood. Oregan Hoskins – President of SARU – proceeded to override Jake White in the selection of Luke Watson as an addition to the 45-man squad submitted by Jake to the South African Rugby Union. Luke Watson went on to represent South Africa in ten tests, his first and solitary test of this particular year being in the following Samoan test at Ellis Park. In a game that was well suited to the fetcher Watson did very little to justify his position in the team. His performance was disjointed and substandard. This prompted Jake to reject him authoritatively – something Jake's successor, Peter de Villiers would do the following year after similarly poor performances. The Springboks won this test convincingly on the scoreboard but Samoa were not to be beaten without a fight in a typical arm-wrestle of a test.

With the Spring Tour successfully negotiated the Boks embarked on their Tri-Nations opener. They began their campaign at home against Australia in a powerful display. They attacked the fringes with strong carries by their big ball carriers and tied up the Australians before attacking wide. Guilty of missing several opportunities they did however leave victory late as the audacious François Steyn blasted over two monstrous drop-goals to seal the result. This set up a tense encounter with arch-rivals New Zealand. The Boks were on course to seal the result before Graham Henry unloaded his bench. His fresh reserves gave New Zealand a much stronger finish which resulted in a match winning try by New Zealand flyer Joe Rokocoko.

Following this test Jake announced that he would be resting his key players for the remainder of the competition. This was met with staunch criticism from their SANZAR partners which went so far as John O'Neill – Head of the Australian Rugby Union – castigating South Africa for not fielding full strength sides on their away leg. O'Neill also said the Springboks had cost Australian Rugby at least 10,000 paying customers at the test in Sydney because of their decision to leave 20 of their best players in South Africa. O'Neill was incensed by comments by Springboks coach Jake White, who said the injury to stand-in Springboks captain Bobby Skinstad justified his decision to rest leading players such as Victor Matfield, Schalk Burger and Bryan Habana. "Now you know why I didn't bring those other guys here," White said. "I could be sitting here with my front-line players out for six months." O'Neill retorted: "Some of the stuff Jake White has said are the most extraordinary of contradictions. He is basically saying that because Bobby Skinstad has a broken rib, that supports his decision to leave all the players behind. He is basically saying that his only objective this year is the World Cup. He has made it clear that whatever he has to do in between – so be it.

That said, the makeshift Springbok side made a mockery of their critics as they led a full strength Australian side 17–0 after 40 minutes. Wikus van Heerden powering over and Breyton Paulse latching onto a wide pass by Nathan Sharpe. Hougaard missed two kickable penalties however. This was Stephen Larkham and George Gregan's final game in Australia; an emotional occasion. Thus they were not to be beaten without a fight. Australia had an attacking line-out inside South Africa's 22, they employed a deceptive play which appeared to be a forward drive with Gregan standing afar but was instead a ruse which had Larkham cut the Boks and send Mark Gerrard over for their opening points. From here the Australians showed just how dangerous their back division could be and scored two further tries to escape an embarrassing defeat and send off their legendary heroes with a victory. The Boks went into the final game of the tournament seemingly without a hope of winning. The All Blacks were deemed far too powerful for this makeshift team. That said they decided to take the fight to their hosts from the first second as JP Pietersen fielded a kick-off and ran right through several would-be tacklers. They played with greater endeavour than what was to be expected. The half-time interval saw New Zealand fractionally ahead 6–3. New Zealand would not see their first try until eleven minutes from time when Rokocoko's flick pass found Leonard. This broke the Boks and two further tries were scored to add gloss to the final score, Carter dotting down after the hooter had sounded. It was noted that the Boks rush defence frustrated the All Blacks and prevented them from executing wider attacking plays. Breyton Paulse in particular was adept at cutting off their outside backs and limiting the All Blacks. Had Hougaard not missed two vital kicks the result may not have been so comfortable.

The Boks unfortunately ended bottom of the table, but had displayed great strength in depth and resolve. Later Eddie Jones would join the Bok camp in a consultancy capacity. He revealed that he worked on the linkage between 9 and 10 and the motion of the ball. It added a little more variety to the Boks in what was an otherwise powerful Springbok side with great skills and considerable fitness. The latter being a part of Jake's plan for the World Cup which was timed perfectly.

The Boks went into the World Cup off the back of two strong wins against Namibia and Scotland. Scotland providing very stern opposition. Captain John Smit remarked that the opening game against Samoa was the most physical he had ever played. The Samoans were full of running and put considerable strain on the Bok's defensive line. They scored the first try through Gavin Williams to bring the score to 9–7. It was an intense arm-wrestle throughout the first half in spite of Montgomery and Habana's tries which gave South Africa a 21–7 half-time lead. The second half started in much the same manner it ended; with Samoa lashing into the Boks. Jean De Villiers was taken off with a torn bicep and replaced by Frans Steyn. Frans' impact was immense and his first touch of the ball was a break out of his own 22 that sent JP Pietersen down the touchline in a breathtaking attack. His physicality in defence of his channel and elusive power on attack seemed to lift the Springboks. He provided the assured authority that Jean was never able to provide. This combined with the Boks' superior set-pieces set the tone for a ruthless demolition of Samoa. The game ended with eight tries to the Boks, a cruel end to what was a heroic showing by the Samoans. The result drew the attention of the rest of the teams in the competition and it was clear the Boks had rolled up with intent. Bryan Habana's quartet of tries reflective of the Bok's willingness to attack with efficient ruthlessness.

Their next encounter was a crucial clash with World Champions England. England, now on a three-game losing streak to the Boks, were on the ropes after a scrappy and poor showing against the USA. It took no longer than four minutes before Du Preez sent Juan Smith over for a try. The Boks dominated their opposition, displaying a tactically astute game plan. Du Preez was the mastermind and he orchestrated South Africa's next try as he regathered a loose ball and tore through England's defence; he sent JP Pietersen over for his first try of the evening and later in the second half broke away on the blindside to put JP Pietersen away for his second. This victory set the tone for South Africa's triumph. They employed a strong tactical kicking game backed-up by stout defence and the best line-out in the world. With a clinical counter-attacking game the Boks were able to vary their approach and ended the year the number one ranked team in the world. The Springboks' final pool match was against the US in Montpellier. They ran in nine tries to two to win 64–15 and finish on top of Pool A. The only downside was a knee injury to prop BJ Botha, which would rule him out for the rest of the World Cup. White was pleased with his team's efforts:

What we wanted to accomplish was to get some structure and continuity to our game. Some of the tries we scored were very pleasing. I don't think the US are as weak as the scoreline suggests. The most important thing was that we put things together on a game day. We haven't been executing them that well so far, but I was happy with the way we kept the ball alive.

Further accolades were to follow; the day after the World Cup final victory, White was named IRB Coach of the Year for the second time. On 29 October, barely a week after the Springboks' World Cup success, the South African Rugby Union (SARU) confirmed that White had not re-applied for the position of Springboks coach and would therefore not be considered for the role. Although White's contract expired on 31 December, he was angry with the way the SARU had acted, stating that his contract did not require him to apply and that he had asked for time to consider his options, but had not been granted his request. Shortly after finishing as Springbok coach, White released his autobiography, In Black and White, The Jake White Story. As of February 2008, the book had sold 210,000 copies in South Africa, outselling even Harry Potter and the Deathly Hallows.

== Post-Springbok coaching career ==
After leading the Springboks to the Rugby World Cup glory Jake White took on a role working at the International Rugby Board assisting with their technical committee. He performed this role from 2008 to 2012.

He also held positions in the IRB as a consultant, as well as in the South African Rugby Legends Association's upliftment programmes for underprivileged people.

=== Brumbies 2012–13 ===
The Brumbies finished first in the Australian conference with ten wins, and third on the overall table. The Reds had also won ten games, but the Brumbies had a greater points difference. They faced the Cheetahs at home in Canberra in a semi-final qualifier, and survived a last-minute scare when Riaan Smit's conversion attempt – which if successful would have forced the match into extra-time – hit the upright, the final score 15–13. The Brumbies then travelled to Pretoria to face the Bulls at Loftus Versfeld in the semi-final. The Bulls had won 22 of their previous 24 games at Loftus, including all five finals.
The Brumbies started well and led at half-time 16–11. But the Bulls were determined to keep their unblemished finals record at home intact, and worked their way back into the game to lead 23–19 with 14 minutes to go. Then Bulls captain Dewald Potgieter turned down three opportunities to score penalty goals, instead opting each time to go for a try, presumably to put the game beyond the Brumbies' reach. In the 78th minute, the Brumbies seized their chance when fly-half Matt To'omua made an incisive break and passed to Tevita Kuridrani who touched down to help give the Brumbies a 26–23 lead. There was still time for one last kick-off, but the Bulls lost possession, enabling the Brumbies to kick the ball into touch and celebrate a victory which White described as "the greatest the Brumbies have ever had". The Brumbies then had to travel to Hamilton where they would have to face the Chiefs in the 2013 Super Rugby final. The Brumbies had led the match 9–0 with 20 minutes gone, however a burst of penalties saw the Chiefs even the score by the 31st minute. A try late on in the first half by Christian Lealiifano saw the Brumbies lead 16–9 at half time. Early on in the second half, Lealiifano booted a further two penalties to reach their final score of 22, with Lealiifano having scored all the points. But two tries conceded at the 63rd and 67th minute by Liam Messam and Robbie Robinson saw the home side lead 24–22 with 10 minutes to go. Despite a strong attack by the Brumbies, the Chiefs defence remained strong and the match finished 27–22.

In 2013 Brumbies beat British & Irish Lions 14–12 during their Australian tour, which was the first Lions loss to a non-international side since 2005, when they lost to Māori All Blacks, though they had a draw with Emerging Springboks in 2009.

After a successful stint with the Brumbies, White was believed to be a strong contender for the Wallabies head coaching role when Robbie Deans resigned. However, he was beaten to the role by fellow Super Rugby coach Ewen McKenzie. Surprisingly, after just two months after leading the Brumbies to second in the Super Rugby, White resigned from his post at the Brumbies explaining he wanted to return home to South Africa. On 7 October 2013, White was appointed director of rugby at the Sharks, replacing Brendan Venter.

=== Sharks: 2014 ===
One of White's first actions as the Sharks' director of rugby was to establish Pat Lambie at fly-half for the upcoming Super Rugby season, saying that he felt that the talented Springbok utility back had been "messed around" with enough. White also announced that François Steyn would play at inside centre. The decision was partly to provide Steyn some much-needed stability, but also because he felt that playing Steyn at inside centre would help Lambie:

With Frans at 12, you will see a much better Pat Lambie. Even at 80 percent, Frans is a better player than most people at 100 percent. We will do whatever we can to make those two the best 10–12 combination in the competition. White's next move was to restructure the Sharks' on-field leadership; he replaced Keegan Daniel with Bismarck du Plessis as captain, and appointed Lambie, Odwa Ndungane and Jean Deysel as vice-captains.

White's first game in charge of the Sharks was a friendly on 25 January with Saracens F.C. in London. On 15 February, the Sharks started their 2014 Super Rugby campaign in the best way possible with a bonus-point 31–16 victory against arch-rivals the Bulls in Durban.
But the Sharks' first major hurdle of the season came during the re-match against the Bulls in Pretoria on 22 March. Up to that stage, the Sharks had been undefeated. In addition to losing the match 23–19, their starting halves combination was injured early. Pat Lambie was subsequently ruled out for the rest of the season with a torn bicep tendon, and Cobus Reinach fractured his hand, which would cause him to miss eight weeks.

White went on to coach the Sharks to top of the South African conference, finishing third overall in the table. They had to host the Highlanders in the quarter-finals, where for much of the match, the home side led, finishing 31–27. Unfortunately for the Sharks, they had to travel to Christchurch to face the Crusaders who were favourite to win the competition. The Sharks lost the match 38–6, conceding 5 tries, 4 of which came in the second half. The result came as a massive surprise for some, since the Sharks had the best defence in the competition in the normal season.

Like with the Brumbies, two months after leading the Sharks to that semi-final, White resigned as Director of Rugby, to pursue an international role ahead of the 2015 Rugby World Cup.

=== Tonga ===
On 13 October 2014, White joined Tonga as a member of the backroom staff, and acted as a technical advisor for head coach Mana Otai for the Test Tour of Europe. White and Otai led Tonga to 2 from 3 wins during their 2014 European Tour. The tour began with a 23–9 victory over Georgia, which included a late surge off tries during the closing quarter to secure the win. The following week, Tonga kept their 100% win rate intact against the United States, winning 40–12 in Gloucester. The 'Ikale Tahi were praised heavily for their defensive abilities in their opening two matches of their tour, keeping Georgia tryless completely and the United States tryless in the second half. But Tonga were also praised for their new attacking flair, and with hand in ball, with some people expecting a first-ever clean sweep on European tour heading into the final match against Scotland. Jake White had believed to be the main inputter into this new structure. Despite the first half being a close 14–12 at half time, Scotland ran away with the match in the second half, scoring a further 3 tries to win 37–12.

Mana Otai had hoped to keep White on board for the World Cup, and until December 2014, there had still been no official announcement on White's future with Tonga.

=== Montpellier ===
On 30 December, Jake White was announced as the new boss for French club Montpellier, where he would oversee all coaching aspects for the club. This came after a poor run of results in both the 2014–15 Top 14 season and the 2014–15 European Rugby Champions Cup. Already Montpellier's forwards coach Mario Ledesma had been sacked, with backs coach Stéphane Glas also tipped to be getting the boot. However, on White announcement, Glas would remain at the club with former Springbok Shaun Sowerby joining the backroom staff as the new forwards coach. Fabien Galthié who was in charge of the club before White, will still remain with the club but it is still unclear what role he will play in the new set-up.

"...He also held positions in the IRB as a consultant, as well as in the South African Rugby Legends Association's upliftment programmes for underprivileged people"

=== Fiji ===
In October 2026, White was announced as the new head coach of Fiji, taking over the position from interim coach Senirusi Seruvakula. White was one of 31 applicants who applied for the role. After being appointed to the position, White stated that it "is a wonderful opportunity, and I'm again deeply grateful for the honour. Together we will work, believe, and rise. The great ascent starts now."

== Springbok coaching record and achievements ==
By year

Year	Played	Won	Lost	Drew	Win ratio (%)
2004	13	9	4		69
2005	12	8	3	1	67
2006	12	5	7		42
2007	17	14	3		82
TOTAL	54	36	17	1	67

By Country

Opponent	Played	Won	Lost	Drew	Win ratio (%)
Argentina	3	3			100
Australia	11	6	5		55
England	7	5	2		71
Fiji	1	1			100
France	4	1	2	1	25
Ireland	4	2	2		50
Namibia	1	1			100
New Zealand	9	3	6		33
Pacific Islanders	1	1			100
Samoa	2	2			100
Scotland	4	4			100
Tonga	1	1			100
United States	1	1			100
Uruguay	1	1			100
Wales	4	4			100
TOTAL	54	36	17	1	67

=== Resume and summary of achievements ===
Before becoming coach of South Africa:

- Jeppe High School for Boys First XV – Hooker
- Jeppe Old Boys Under 20 – Hooker
- Johannesburg College of Education First XV – Hooker
- 1982–1985 Coached Park Town Boys High First XV
- 1986–1994 Worked as a Physical Education teacher
- 1986–1988 Coached 14a, 15a
- 1989–1994 Coached Jeppe Boys High School First XV.
  - Unbeaten in 1991 and 1994, beating Grey High School 46–0 in his last game as coach.
- 1995 Attended International Coaching Congress
- 1995–1997 Director of Coaching for Transvaal Rugby Union
- Fitness Coach and Technical Adviser for Gauteng Lions in Super 12
- 1997 National Coaching Congress
- 1997-1999 Technical advisor for Springboks
- 1999 Assistant Coach for Springbok U-21
- 2000 Assistant Coach to the Natal Sharks
- 2000–2001 Springboks Assistant Coach
- Level 4 coaching certificate

White's notable achievements as Springbok head coach include:

- Winning the Tri Nations (2004)
- Winning the World Cup (2007)
- Taking South Africa from 6th on the IRB World Rankings (2003) to 1st (2007)
- IRB International Coach of the Year (2004, 2007)
- Biggest score ever achieved by a Springbok side (134–3 against Uruguay in 2005)
- First home series win against France since 1975
- First victory over the All Blacks at Newlands since 1976
- Consecutive wins against Australia and New Zealand for the first time since 1998
  - Most successful South African team at home in the history of Springbok rugby, undefeated at home in 11 tests (they would extend this streak to 13)
  - First South African team to beat Australia 3 times in the same year since 1971
  - First South African team to beat Australia in Australia since 1998

Other achievements:

- Coach of the year 2020 (Bulls) South Africa's Player of the Year revealed
- Winning the Super Rugby Unlocked (2020)
- Winning the Currie Cup (2020-21)
- Coach of the year 2021 (Bulls) Siya Kolisi scoops top SA Rugby Award for 2021 | SA Rugby
- Winning the Currie Cup (2021)
- Runner-up in the 2021–22 United Rugby Championship

== Notes ==
Awards
Preceded by 2003 Clive Woodward; 2006 Graham Henry	IRB International Coach of the Year; 2004; 2007	Succeeded by 2005 Graham Henry; 2008 Graham Henry
Sporting positions
Preceded by Rudolf Straeuli	South Africa National Rugby Union Coach; 2004–2007	Succeeded by Peter de Villiers
Preceded by Senirusi Seruvakula	Fiji National Rugby Union Coach; 2026–present	Succeeded by Incumbent
