= Joe van Niekerk =

South African rugby union player

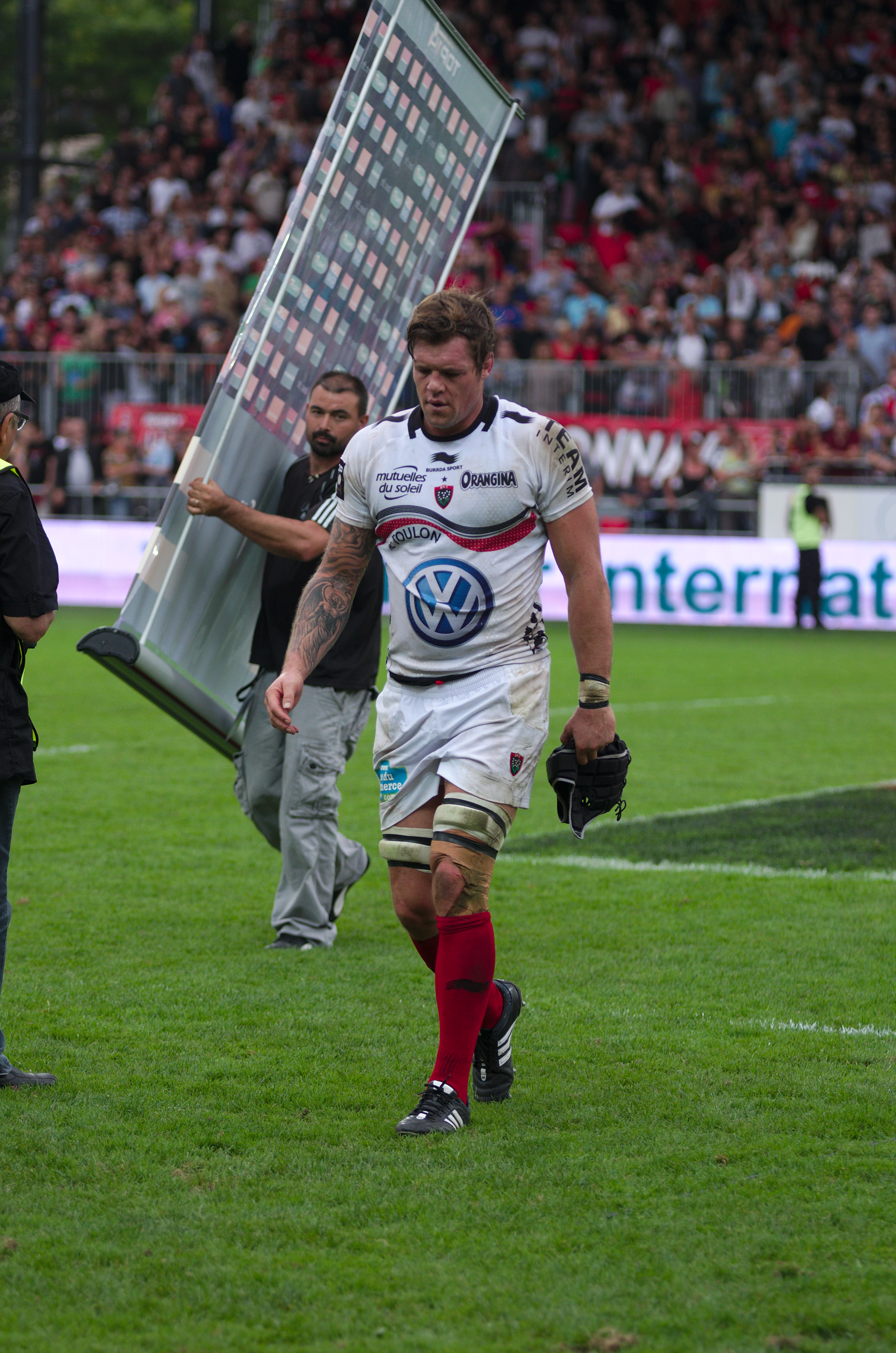
- van Niekerk playing in 2013
- Born: Johann van Niekerk; 14 May 1980 (age 46) Port Elizabeth, South Africa
- Height: 1.93 m (6 ft 4 in)
- Weight: 108 kg (238 lb)
- School: King Edward VII School, Johannesburg

Rugby union career
- Position: Flanker/No.8
Senior career
Years	Team	Apps	(Points)
2008–2014	Toulon	122	(120)
Provincial / State sides
Years	Team	Apps	(Points)
2004–2007	Western Province		
Super Rugby
Years	Team	Apps	(Points)
2002–2003	Lions		
2004–2007	Stormers		
International career
Years	Team	Apps	(Points)
2001–2010	South Africa	52	(50)

Johann "Joe" van Niekerk (born 14 May 1980) is a South African former professional rugby union player who played either as a flanker or number 8.

== Career overview ==
After starring for the South Africa Schools, under-19, and under-21 sides, and captaining at all three levels, van Niekerk received the rare honour of being called up to the Springboks directly from the U21 side in 2001, in spite of never having played a game in either the Currie Cup or Super 12. He made his debut against the All Blacks in Cape Town.

Van Niekerk has experienced injury troubles throughout his senior-level career. When healthy, however, he is considered able to compete with virtually any back-row player in the world. He scored important tries for the Boks in home wins over the Wallabies in the 2002 Tri Nations Series and the 2004 Tri Nations Series. He has often been used as an "impact player" off the bench, especially in the 2005 Tri Nations Series.

In 2002, he was voted the South African "Player of the Year". In the first match of the 2008 Tri Nations Series against the All Blacks in Wellington, he was a surprise choice to start at No. 8. He was expected to play for the Northampton Saints however his contract was terminated before he arrived, reportedly because of constant injury problems. In May 2013 he played as a replacement as Toulon won the 2013 Heineken Cup Final by 16–15 against Clermont Auvergne. After 2014 Heineken Cup Final van Niekerk has officially retired from rugby union.

Van Niekerk resides in Costa Rica and runs Rama Organica organic farm.

== Teams ==
- South African Schools 1997–1998
- South Africa Under-19 1998
- South Africa Under-21 2000/2001
- South African Sevens 2001
- Gauteng Lions U21 1998–2001
- Gauteng Lions 2001–2003
- Lions Super 12 Team 2002–2003
- Stormers Super Rugby Team 2004–2007
- Western Province 2004–2007
- Springboks 2001–2012
- Northampton Saints (contract was terminated before arrival)
- Toulon (France) 2008 – 2014

== Honours ==
=== Toulon ===
- Heineken Cup: 2013, 2014
- European Challenge Cup runner-up: 2009–10, 2011–12
- Top 14 : 2014
- Top 14 runner-up: 2012, 2013

=== South Africa ===
- Tri Nations: 2004
