= 2006 Australia rugby union tour of Europe =

Series of rugby matches by Australian team

- Coach: John Connolly
- Tour captain: Stirling Mortlock
Summary
P	W	D	L
Total
7	4	1	2
Test match
4	2	1	1
Opponent
P	W	D	L
Wales
1	0	1	0
Italy
1	1	0	0
Ireland
1	0	0	1
Scotland
1	1	0	0

Tour chronology
- ← 2005 2008 →

The 2006 Australian national rugby union team tour to Europe, known in Australia as the 2006 Wallabies Spring Tour, was part of a 2006 end-of-year rugby test series and took place in November 2006. The tour consisted of test matches against Wales, Italy, Ireland and Scotland as well as midweek games against Ireland A, Scotland A and Welsh team, the Ospreys.

The tour was the first time this decade that captain George Gregan would miss out on a Wallabies tour, opting to miss in preparation ahead of the 2007 Rugby World Cup. With this, Stirling Mortlock was named captain but missed out on the opening match due to injury. Phil Waugh was subsequently named as captain.

On 11 October, Wallabies half-back Sam Cordingley pulled out of the tour to rest a nagging foot injury, leaving Australia without their top two half-backs. Another injury concern for the Wallabies was the injury to prop Greg Holmes, who announced that he was unable to tour due to a neck injury sustained during training; Brumbies prop Nic Henderson was called into the squad.

== Squad ==
Props

- Nic Henderson
- Rodney Blake
- Guy Shepherdson
- Al Baxter
- Benn Robinson

Hookers

- Brendan Cannon
- Tatafu Polota-Nau
- Tai McIsaac (also prop)
- Stephen Moore

Locks

- Nathan Sharpe
- James Horwill
- Mitchell Chapman
- Mark Chisholm
- Alister Campbell

Back row

- George Smith
- Rocky Elsom (also lock)
- Phil Waugh (vice-captain)
- Wycliff Palu
- David Lyons
- Scott Fava
- Stephen Hoiles

Scrum-halves

- Josh Valentine
- Brett Sheehan

Fly-halves

- Stephen Larkham (also centre) (vice-captain)
- Mat Rogers (also centre, wing and fullback)
- Gene Fairbanks (also centre)

Centres

- Matt Giteau (also scrum-half and fly-half)
- Stirling Mortlock (captain)
- Adam Ashley-Cooper (also fullback)
- Morgan Turinui (also wing, fly-half and flanker)

Wings

- Mark Gerrard (also centre, fly-half and fullback)
- Lote Tuqiri (also centre)
- Clyde Rathbone (also centre)
- Cameron Shepherd (also fullback)

Fullbacks

- Chris Latham (vice-captain)
- Drew Mitchell (also wing)
- Scott Staniforth (also centre and wing)

Injured players

- Dan Vickerman – Injured in test against Wales. Replaced by Mitchell Chapman.
- Hugh McMeniman – Injured in match against Ospreys. Replaced by Scott Fava.
- Greg Holmes – Injured in pre-tour Training. Replaced by Nic Henderson.
- Sam Cordingley – Injured in pre-tour training. Replaced by Josh Valentine.
- George Gregan – Opted not to tour in favour of preparation for 2007 Rugby World Cup. Not included in original squad.

== Matches ==
Date	Home team	Score	Away team	Venue	Staus
1 November	Ospreys (Wales)	24–16	Australia XV	Liberty Stadium, Swansea	Tour match
4 November	Wales	29–29	Australia	Millennium Stadium, Cardiff	Test match
11 November	Italy	18–25	Australia	Stadio Flaminio, Rome	Test match
15 November	Ireland A	17–24	Australia XV	Thomond Park, Limerick	Tour match
19 November	Ireland	21–6	Australia	Lansdowne Road, Dublin	Test match
21 November	Scotland A	20–44	AustraliaXV	McDiarmid Park, Perth	Tour match
25 November	Scotland	15–44	Australia	Murrayfield Stadium, Edinburgh	Test match

1 November 2006

Ospreys	24–16	Australia XV
Try: Williams; Mustoe; Con: Connor; Pen: Connor (3); Drop: Connor		Try: Ashley-Cooper; Con: Shepherd; Pen: Shepherd (3)

Liberty Stadium
Attendance: 20,520
Referee: Andrew Small (England)

4 November 2006

Wales	29–29	Australia
Try: S. Williams; M. Williams; Con: Hook (2); Pen: S. Jones; Henson; Hook (3)	Report	Try: Shepherd (2); Giteau; Latham; Con: Giteau (3); Pen: Giteau

Millennium Stadium, Cardiff
Attendance: 74,158
Referee: Steve Walsh (New Zealand)

Wales: 15. Kevin Morgan, 14. Gareth Thomas, 13. Tom Shanklin, 12. Gavin Henson, 11. Shane Williams, 10. Stephen Jones (c), 9. Dwayne Peel, 8. Ryan Jones, 7. Martyn Williams, 6. Jonathan Thomas, 5. Ian Evans, 4. Ian Gough, 3. Adam Jones, 2. Matthew Rees, 1. Gethin Jenkins, – Replacements: 17. Duncan Jones, 21. James Hook – Unused: 16. T. Rhys Thomas, 18. Alun Wyn Jones, 19. Gavin Thomas, 20. Mike Phillips, 22. Mark Jones
Australia: 15. Chris Latham, 14. Clyde Rathbone, 13. Lote Tuqiri, 12. Stephen Larkham, 11. Cameron Shepherd, 10. Mat Rogers, 9. Matt Giteau, 8. Wycliff Palu, 7. Phil Waugh (c), 6. Rocky Elsom, 5. Dan Vickerman, 4. Nathan Sharpe, 3. Rodney Blake, 2. Tai McIsaac, 1. Al Baxter, – Replacements: 16. Brendan Cannon, 18. Mark Chisholm, 19. Stephen Hoiles, 20. Josh Valentine – Unused: 17. Benn Robinson, 21. Mark Gerrard, 22. Adam Ashley-Cooper

11 November 2006

Italy	18–25	Australia
Pen: Pez (6)	Report	Try: Rogers; Shepherdson; Mortlock; Con: Mortlock (2); Pen: Mortlock (2)

Stadio Flaminio, Rome
Referee: Nigel Owens (Wales)

Italy: 15. Gert Peens, 14. Marko Stanojevic, 13. Gonzalo Canale, 12. Mirco Bergamasco, 11. Pablo Canavosio, 10. Ramiro Pez, 9. Paul Griffen, 8. Sergio Parisse, 7. Mauro Bergamasco, 6. Alessandro Zanni, 5. Marco Bortolami (c), 4. Santiago Dellapè, 3. Martin Castrogiovanni, 2. Carlo Festuccia, 1. Andrea Lo Cicero, – Replacements: 17. Carlos Nieto, 19. Josh Sole – Unused: 16. Leonardo Ghiraldini, 18. Carlo Del Fava, 20. Simon Picone, 21. Andrea Scanavacca, 22. Walter Pozzebon
Australia: 15. Chris Latham, 14. Clyde Rathbone, 13. Stirling Mortlock (c), 12. Stephen Larkham, 11. Lote Tuqiri (yellow card) , 10. Mat Rogers, 9. Matt Giteau, 8. Wycliff Palu, 7. George Smith, 6. Rocky Elsom, 5. Mark Chisholm, 4. Nathan Sharpe, 3. Guy Shepherdson, 2. Brendan Cannon (yellow card) , 1. Al Baxter, – Replacements: 16. Stephen Moore, 17. Nic Henderson, 18. Alister Campbell – Unused: 19. Stephen Hoiles, 20. Josh Valentine, 21. Mark Gerrard, 22. Cameron Shepherd

15 November 2006

Ireland A	17–24	Australia XV
Try: Fitzgerald; Pen: Staunton (4)		Try: Ashley-Cooper; Turinui; Staniforth; Con: Shepherd (3); Pen: Shepherd

Thomond Park, Limerick
Attendance: 6,500
Referee: Rob Debney (England)

19 November 2006

Ireland	21–6	Australia
Try: Hickie; Murphy; Con: O'Gara; Pen: O'Gara (3)	Report	Pen: Mortlock (2)

Lansdowne Road, Dublin
Attendance: 43,000
Referee: Marius Jonker (South Africa)

Ireland: 15. Geordan Murphy, 14. Shane Horgan, 13. Brian O'Driscoll (c), 12. Gordon D'Arcy, 11. Denis Hickie, 10. Ronan O'Gara, 9. Isaac Boss, 8. Denis Leamy (yellow card) , 7. David Wallace, 6. Neil Best, 5. Paul O'Connell, 4. Donncha O'Callaghan, 3. John Hayes, 2. Rory Best, 1. Bryan Young, – Replacements: 16. Frankie Sheahan, 17. Marcus Horan, 18. Malcolm O'Kelly, 19. Simon Easterby, 20. Peter Stringer, 21. Paddy Wallace, 22. Girvan Dempsey
Australia: 15. Chris Latham, 14. Clyde Rathbone, 13. Lote Tuqiri, 12. Stirling Mortlock (c), 11. Mark Gerrard, 10. Stephen Larkham, 9. Matt Giteau, 8. Wycliff Palu, 7. Phil Waugh (yellow card) , 6. Rocky Elsom, 5. Mark Chisholm, 4. Nathan Sharpe, 3. Guy Shepherdson, 2. Tai McIsaac, 1. Al Baxter, – Replacements: 16. Stephen Moore, 17. Benn Robinson, 18. Alister Campbell, 19. George Smith, 20. Josh Valentine, 21. Mat Rogers (yellow card) , 22. Scott Staniforth

21 November 2006

Scotland A	20–44	Australia XV
Try: Morrison; Lawson; R. Lamont; Con: Ross; Pen: Ross		Try: Blake (2); Mitchell (2); Sheehan; Shepherd; Con: Shepherd (4); Pen: Shepherd (2)

McDiarmid Park, Perth
Referee: Andrew Small (England)

25 November 2006

Scotland	15–44	Australia
Try: Webster; S. Lamont; Con: Paterson; Pen: Paterson	Report	Try: Larkham; Gerrard (2); Moore; Latham; Con: Mortlock (5); Pen: Mortlock (3)

Murrayfield Stadium, Edinburgh
Attendance: 64,120
Referee: Donal Courtney (Ireland)

Scotland: 15. Chris Paterson (c), 14. Sean Lamont, 13. Marcus Di Rollo, 12. Andrew Henderson, 11. Simon Webster, 10. Dan Parks, 9. Mike Blair, 8. David Callam, 7. Kelly Brown, 6. Simon Taylor, 5. Scott Murray, 4. Alastair Kellock, 3. Euan Murray, 2. Dougie Hall, 1. Gavin Kerr, – Replacements: 16. Ross Ford, 17. Allan Jacobsen (yellow card) , 18. Jim Hamilton, 19. Alasdair Strokosch, 20. Rory Lawson, 21. Phil Godman, 22. Hugo Southwell
Australia: 15. Chris Latham, 14. Mark Gerrard, 13. Stirling Mortlock (c), 12. Scott Staniforth, 11. Lote Tuqiri, 10. Stephen Larkham, 9. Matt Giteau, 8. David Lyons, 7. George Smith, 6. Rocky Elsom, 5. Alister Campbell (yellow card) , 4. Nathan Sharpe, 3. Guy Shepherdson, 2. Stephen Moore, 1. Benn Robinson, – Replacements: 16. Tatafu Polota-Nau, 17. Al Baxter, 18. Mark Chisholm, 19. Phil Waugh, 20. Wycliff Palu, 21. Josh Valentine, 22. Mat Rogers

== See also ==
- 2006 end-of-year rugby union tests
- The Wallabies
- Australia A
- Ireland
- Gli Azzurri
- Scotland
- Wales
