= 2007 Tri Nations Series =

- Date: 16 June – 21 July

Final positions
- Champions: New Zealand (8th title)
- Bledisloe Cup: New Zealand
- Freedom Cup: New Zealand
- Mandela Challenge Plate: Australia

Tournament statistics
- Matches played: 6
- Tries scored: 19 (3.17 per match)
- Attendance: 310,998 (51,833 per match)
- Top scorer(s): (New Zealand) Dan Carter (62)
- Most tries: (New Zealand) Tony Woodcock (2) (Australia) Matt Giteau (2)

The 2007 Tri Nations Series was an annual rugby union competition between the national teams of Australia, New Zealand and South Africa. The series began in South Africa on 16 June, with a Test between South Africa and Australia at Newlands, Cape Town and ended on 21 July in Eden Park, Auckland with a Test between New Zealand and Australia. The winners, for the third consecutive year, were New Zealand.

The 2007 series consisted of six matches (two home matches each), three fewer than the 2006 series, because of the 2007 Rugby World Cup which would commence on 7 September. The draw was scheduled to ensure that no team played more than two matches in a row, the early finish allowing each team seven full weeks before the start of the World Cup.

The competition reverted to a nine-Test series from 2008 onwards. Early in 2007, it was thought that there was a chance that Argentina could be admitted to the competition as early as 2008, as it had been reported that the worldwide governing body for rugby union, the International Rugby Board, was brokering a deal for the entry of the Pumas. However, by August of that year, it became clear that the competition would not be expanded while the current media contracts ran; the key contract with News Corporation would not expire until 2010.

The tournament had been put into jeopardy after the Springboks team confirmed they were sending a below strength side for the Australasian leg of the tournament.

== Springbok selection controversy ==
New Zealand and Australian rugby officials considered on the news of the below strength Springbok team, that they might consider scrapping their remaining fixtures against South Africa but cited that because of many arrangements including broadcasting, stadium and ticket arrangements that it might be too complicated. The ARU also retracted proposals to continue the series without the Springboks after SARU sent a medical report, citing a sport scientist saying "they (the Springboks) might as well not bother going to the World Cup" if they send top injured players to the remaining games. The match turned out to be much more competitive than many observers had predicted, with South Africa storming to a 17–0 lead in the first 16 minutes before the Wallabies regained their composure to eventually overrun the Boks 25–17.

== Standings ==
Place	Nation	Games				Points			Bonus points	Table points
Place	Nation	Played	Won	Drawn	Lost	For	Against	Difference	Bonus points	Table points
1	New Zealand	4	3	0	1	100	59	+41	1	13
2	Australia	4	2	0	2	76	80	−4	1	9
3	South Africa	4	1	0	3	66	103	−37	1	5

== Results ==
All times are local.

=== Round 1 ===
16 June 2007
15:00 SAST (UTC+02)

South Africa	22–19	Australia (1 BP)
Try: Fourie 15' c Con: Montgomery (1/1); Pen: Montgomery (3/3) 3', 45', 53'; Drop: Steyn (2/2) 74', 77'		Try: Giteau 31' c Con: Mortlock (1/1); Pen: Mortlock (4/4) 13', 29', 36', 44'

Newlands Stadium, Cape Town
Attendance: 48,416
Referee: Wayne Barnes (England)

FB	15	Percy Montgomery
RW	14	Ashwin Willemse	(substituted off) 60'
OC	13	Jaque Fourie
IC	12	Jean de Villiers
LW	11	JP Pietersen
FH	10	Butch James
SH	9	Ruan Pienaar
N8	8	Pierre Spies
OF	7	Juan Smith	(substituted off) 54'
BF	6	Schalk Burger
RL	5	Victor Matfield
LL	4	Bakkies Botha	(substituted off) 63'
TP	3	BJ Botha	(substituted off) 60'	(substituted in) 67'
HK	2	John Smit (c)	(substituted off) 10'
LP	1	Gurthro Steenkamp		(substituted off) 67'
Substitutions:
HK	16	Gary Botha	(substituted in) 10'
PR	17	CJ van der Linde	(substituted in) 60'
LK	18	Johann Muller	(substituted in) 63'
N8	19	Danie Rossouw	(substituted in) 54'
SH	20	Michael Claassens
CE	21	Wynand Olivier
FB	22	François Steyn	(substituted in) 60'
Coach:
(South Africa) Jake White

FB	15	Julian Huxley
RW	14	Drew Mitchell
OC	13	Stirling Mortlock (c)	(substituted off) 79'
IC	12	Matt Giteau
LW	11	Lote Tuqiri
FH	10	Stephen Larkham
SH	9	George Gregan
N8	8	Wycliff Palu	(substituted off) 79'
OF	7	George Smith	(substituted off) 57'
BF	6	Rocky Elsom	(substituted off) 57'
RL	5	Daniel Vickerman
LL	4	Nathan Sharpe
TP	3	Guy Shepherdson
HK	2	Stephen Moore	(substituted off) 63'
LP	1	Matt Dunning
Substitutions:
HK	16	Adam Freier	(substituted in) 63'
PR	17	Al Baxter
LK	18	Mark Chisholm	(substituted in) 57'
FL	19	Stephen Hoiles	(substituted in) 79'
FL	20	Phil Waugh	(substituted in) 57'
CE	21	Adam Ashley-Cooper
WG	22	Mark Gerrard	(substituted in) 79'
Coach:
(Australia) John Connolly

=== Round 2 ===
23 June 2007
15:00 SAST (UTC+02)

(1 BP) South Africa	21–26	New Zealand
Try: Burger 40' c James 44' c Con: Montgomery (1/2); Pen: Montgomery (2/2) 5', 66'; Pienaar (1/1) 19'		Try: McCaw 69' c Rokocoko 71' c Con: Carter (2/2); Pen: Carter (3/3) 31', 38', 55'; Drop: Mauger (1/1) 42'

Kings Park Stadium, Durban
Attendance: 51,861
Referee: Alain Rolland (Ireland)

FB	15	Percy Montgomery
RW	14	Ashwin Willemse	(substituted off) 65'
OC	13	Jaque Fourie
IC	12	Jean de Villiers
LW	11	JP Pietersen
FH	10	Butch James	(substituted off) 52'
SH	9	Ruan Pienaar
N8	8	Bobby Skinstad	(substituted off) 52'
OF	7	Danie Rossouw
BF	6	Schalk Burger
RL	5	Victor Matfield (c)
LL	4	Bakkies Botha	(substituted off) 65'
TP	3	BJ Botha
HK	2	Gary Botha
LP	1	Os du Randt	(substituted off) 53'
Substitutions:
HK	16	Bismarck du Plessis
PR	17	CJ van der Linde	(substituted in) 53'
LK	18	Johann Muller	(substituted in) 65'
N8	19	Pedrie Wannenburg	(substituted in) 52'
SH	20	Michael Claassens
FH	21	Wynand Olivier	(substituted in) 65'
CE	22	François Steyn	(substituted in) 52'
Coach:
(South Africa) Jake White

FB	15	Mils Muliaina	(substituted off) 70'
RW	14	Joe Rokocoko
OC	13	Isaia Toeava
IC	12	Aaron Mauger	(substituted off) 66'
LW	11	Sitiveni Sivivatu
FH	10	Dan Carter
SH	9	Byron Kelleher	(substituted off) 70'
N8	8	Rodney So'oialo
OF	7	Richie McCaw (c)
BF	6	Jerry Collins
RL	5	Greg Rawlinson	(substituted off) 48'
LL	4	Troy Flavell
TP	3	Carl Hayman
HK	2	Anton Oliver	(substituted off) 51'
LP	1	Tony Woodcock
Substitutions:
HK	16	Keven Mealamu	(substituted in) 51'
PR	17	Neemia Tialata
LK	18	Ross Filipo	(substituted in) 48'
FL	19	Chris Masoe
SH	20	Piri Weepu	(substituted in) 70'
CE	21	Luke McAlister	(substituted in) 66'
FB	22	Leon MacDonald	(substituted in) 70'
Coach:
(New Zealand) Graham Henry

=== Round 3 ===
30 June 2007
20:00 AEST (UTC+10)

Australia	20–15	New Zealand (1 BP)
Try: Ashley-Cooper 64' c Staniforth 71' c Con: Giteau (2/2); Pen: Mortlock (2) 14', 19'		Try: Woodcock 3' c Gear 26' m Con: Carter (1/2); Pen: Carter 17'

Melbourne Cricket Ground, Melbourne
Attendance: 79,322
Referee: Marius Jonker (South Africa)

FB	15	Julian Huxley
RW	14	Adam Ashley-Cooper
OC	13	Stirling Mortlock (c)
IC	12	Matt Giteau
LW	11	Lote Tuqiri
FH	10	Stephen Larkham
SH	9	George Gregan	(substituted off) 55'
N8	8	Rocky Elsom	(substituted off) 70'
OF	7	George Smith	(substituted off) 70'
BF	6	Wycliff Palu	(substituted off) 40'
RL	5	Daniel Vickerman
LL	4	Nathan Sharpe
TP	3	Guy Shepherdson
HK	2	Stephen Moore	(substituted off) 47'
LP	1	Matt Dunning	(substituted off) 77'
Substitutions:
HK	16	Adam Freier	(substituted in) 47'
PR	17	Al Baxter	(substituted in) 77'
FL	18	Mark Chisholm	(substituted in) 70'
LK	19	Stephen Hoiles	(substituted in) 40'
FL	20	Phil Waugh	(substituted in) 70'
FH	21	Scott Staniforth	(substituted in) 55'
FB	22	Mark Gerrard
Coach:
(Australia) John Connolly

FB	15	Mils Muliaina
RW	14	Rico Gear
OC	13	Luke McAlister
IC	12	Aaron Mauger
LW	11	Joe Rokocoko		(substituted off) 75'
FH	10	Dan Carter
SH	9	Byron Kelleher		(substituted off) 50'
N8	8	Rodney So'oialo		(substituted off) 74'
OF	7	Richie McCaw (c)
BF	6	Jerry Collins			(substituted off) 65'
RL	5	Troy Flavell		(substituted off) 45'
LL	4	Chris Jack
TP	3	Carl Hayman	(yellow card) 61' to 71'
HK	2	Anton Oliver		(substituted off) 45'
LP	1	Tony Woodcock		(substituted off) 45'	(substituted in) 65'
Substitutions:
PR	16	Keven Mealamu		(substituted in) 45'
PR	17	Neemia Tialata		(substituted in) 45'
LK	18	Ross Filipo		(substituted in) 45'
FL	19	Chris Masoe		(substituted in) 74'
SH	20	Piri Weepu		(substituted in) 50'
FH	21	Nick Evans
WG	22	Sitiveni Sivivatu		(substituted in) 75'
Coach:
(New Zealand) Graham Henry

=== Round 4 ===
7 July 2007
20:00 AEST (UTC+10)

Australia	25–17	South Africa
Try: Gerrard 22' c Hoiles 42' c Giteau 55' m Con: Mortlock (2/3); Pen: Mortlock (2/2)		Try: van Heerden 6' c Paulse 8' c Con: Hougaard (2/2); Pen: Hougaard 16' (1/3)

Stadium Australia, Sydney
Attendance: 51,174
Referee: Paul Honiss (New Zealand)

FB	15	Julian Huxley
RW	14	Mark Gerrard
OC	13	Stirling Mortlock (c)
IC	12	Matt Giteau	(substituted off) 78'
LW	11	Adam Ashley-Cooper	(substituted off) 78'
FH	10	Stephen Larkham
SH	9	George Gregan
N8	8	Stephen Hoiles	(substituted off) 64'
OF	7	George Smith	(substituted off) 71'
BF	6	Rocky Elsom	(substituted off) 60'
RL	5	Daniel Vickerman
LL	4	Nathan Sharpe
TP	3	Guy Shepherdson	(substituted off) 58'
HK	2	Adam Freier	(substituted off) 20'	(substituted in) 34'	(substituted off) 64'
LP	1	Matt Dunning	(substituted off) 73'
Substitutions:
HK	16	Sean Hardman	(substituted in) 20'	(substituted off) 34'	(substituted in) 64'
PR	17	Al Baxter	(substituted in) 58'
LK	18	Hugh McMeniman	(substituted in) 60'
FL	19	David Lyons	(substituted in) 64'
FL	20	Phil Waugh	(substituted in) 71'
FH	21	Scott Staniforth	(substituted in) 78'
FB	22	Drew Mitchell	(substituted in) 78'
Coach:
(Australia) John Connolly

FB	15	Bevin Fortuin		(substituted off) 73'
RW	14	Breyton Paulse
OC	13	Waylon Murray
IC	12	Wynand Olivier
LW	11	JP Pietersen
FH	10	Derick Hougaard		(substituted off) 73'
SH	9	Ruan Pienaar
N8	8	Bobby Skinstad (c)				(substituted off) 62'
OF	7	Pedrie Wannenburg		(substituted off) 49'
BF	6	Wikus van Heerden
RL	5	Johann Muller
LL	4	Johan Ackerman		(substituted off) 29'
TP	3	Jannie du Plessis		(substituted off) 73'
HK	2	Gary Botha	(yellow card) 58' to 68'
LP	1	CJ van der Linde
Substitutions:
PR	16	Bismarck du Plessis			(substituted in) 58'
PR	17	Eddie Andrews		(substituted in) 73'
LK	18	Albert van den Berg		(substituted in) 29'
FL	19	Jacques Cronjé		(substituted in) 49'	(substituted off) 58'	(substituted in) 62'
SH	20	Michael Claassens		(substituted in) 73'
FH	21	Peter Grant		(substituted in) 73'
CE	22	Jaco Pretorius
Coach:
(South Africa) Jack White

=== Round 5 ===
14 July 2007
19:35 NZST (UTC+12)

New Zealand	33–6	South Africa
Try: Leonard 69' c Evans 76' c Carter 80' c Con: Carter (3); Pen: Carter (4)		Pen: Hougaard (2)

Lancaster Park, Christchurch
Attendance: 33,708
Referee: Stuart Dickinson (Australia)

FB	15	Mils Muliaina
RW	14	Doug Howlett	(substituted off) 74'
OC	13	Isaia Toeava	(substituted off) 78'
IC	12	Luke McAlister
LW	11	Joe Rokocoko
FH	10	Dan Carter
SH	9	Piri Weepu	(substituted off) 54'
N8	8	Rodney So'oialo	(substituted off) 74'
OF	7	Richie McCaw (c)
BF	6	Reuben Thorne
RL	5	Keith Robinson	(substituted off) 64'
LL	4	Chris Jack
TP	3	Carl Hayman	(substituted off) 78'
HK	2	Keven Mealamu	(substituted off) 74'
LP	1	Tony Woodcock
Substitutions:
HK	16	Andrew Hore	(substituted in) 74'
PR	17	Neemia Tialata	(substituted in) 78'
FL	18	Jerry Collins	(substituted in) 64'
FL	19	Chris Masoe	(substituted in) 74'
SH	20	Brendon Leonard	(substituted in) 54'
CE	21	Conrad Smith	(substituted in) 78'
FH	22	Nick Evans	(substituted in) 74'
Coach:
(New Zealand) Graham Henry

FB	15	JP Pietersen
RW	14	Breyton Paulse		(substituted off) 78'
OC	13	Waylon Murray
IC	12	Wynand Olivier
LW	11	Jaco Pretorius		(substituted off) 74'
FH	10	Derick Hougaard		(substituted off) 57'
SH	9	Ruan Pienaar
N8	8	Jacques Cronjé
OF	7	Pedrie Wannenburg	(yellow card) 53' to 63'	(substituted off) 78'
BF	6	Wikus van Heerden
RL	5	Johann Muller (c)
LL	4	Albert van den Berg		(substituted off) 68'
TP	3	Jannie du Plessis
HK	2	Bismarck du Plessis		(substituted off) 68'
LP	1	CJ van der Linde		(substituted off) 78'
Substitutions:
HK	16	Gary Botha		(substituted in) 68'
PR	17	Eddie Andrews		(substituted in) 78'
LK	18	Gerrie Britz		(substituted in) 68'
FL	19	Hilton Lobberts		(substituted in) 78'
SH	20	Michael Claassens		(substituted in) 78'
FH	21	Peter Grant		(substituted in) 57'
WG	22	Tonderai Chavhanga		(substituted in) 74'
Coach:
(South Africa) Jake White

=== Round 6 ===
21 July 2007
19:35 NZST (UTC+12)

New Zealand	26–12	Australia
Try: Woodcock 58' m Pen: Carter (7) 10', 29', 36', 39', 44', 51', 73'		Pen: Mortlock (3) 24', 33', 47'; Drop: Giteau 25'

Eden Park, Auckland
Attendance: 45,000
Referee: Nigel Owens (Wales)

FB	15	Mils Muliaina
RW	14	Doug Howlett
OC	13	Isaia Toeava
IC	12	Luke McAlister
LW	11	Joe Rokocoko
FH	10	Dan Carter
SH	9	Byron Kelleher
N8	8	Rodney So'oialo
OF	7	Richie McCaw (c)
BF	6	Jerry Collins
RL	5	Chris Jack
LL	4	Keith Robinson
TP	3	Carl Hayman
HK	2	Anton Oliver
LP	1	Tony Woodcock
Substitutions:
HK	16	Keven Mealamu
PR	17	Neemia Tialata
LK	18	Reuben Thorne
FL	19	Chris Masoe
SH	20	Brendon Leonard
CE	21	Aaron Mauger
FH	22	Nick Evans
Coach:
(New Zealand) Graham Henry

FB	15	Adam Ashley-Cooper
RW	14	Mark Gerrard
OC	13	Stirling Mortlock (c)
IC	12	Matt Giteau
LW	11	Drew Mitchell
FH	10	Stephen Larkham
SH	9	George Gregan
N8	8	Stephen Hoiles
OF	7	George Smith
BF	6	Rocky Elsom
RL	5	Daniel Vickerman
LL	4	Nathan Sharpe
TP	3	Guy Shepherdson
HK	2	Stephen Moore
LP	1	Matt Dunning
Substitutions:
HK	16	Adam Freier
PR	17	Al Baxter
FL	18	Hugh McMeniman
LK	19	Mark Chisholm
FL	20	Phil Waugh
CE	21	Scott Staniforth
FB	22	Chris Latham
Coach:
(Australia) John Connolly
