= 2004 Australia rugby union tour of Europe =

Summary
P	W	D	L
Total
5	3	0	2
Test match
4	2	0	2
Opponent
P	W	D	L
Scotland
2	2	0	0
France
1	0	0	1
England
1	0	0	1

The 2004 Wallabies spring tour was a series of five matches played by the Australia national rugby union team in November 2004.

== Matches ==
6 November 2004

Scotland	14–31	Australia
Try: Lamont, Southwell; Con: Paterson 2		Try: Mortlock, Rathbone 2 Con: Tuqiri; Pen: Giteau 4 Drop: Giteau

Murrayfield Stadium, Edinburgh
Attendance: 42,000
Referee: Steve Walsh (New Zealand)

Scotland: 15. Stuart Moffat, 14. Sean Lamont, 13. Graeme Morrison, 12. Andrew Henderson, 11. Chris Paterson, 10. Dan Parks, 9. Chris Cusiter, 8. Ally Hogg, 7. Donnie Macfadyen, 6. Scott Gray, 5. Scott Macleod, 4. Nathan Hines, 3. Bruce Douglas, 2. Gordon Bulloch (c), 1. Allan Jacobsen – Replacements: 16. Ross Ford, 17. Craig Smith, 18. Alastair Kellock, 19. Jon Petrie, 20. Mike Blair, 21. Andy Craig, 22. Hugo Southwell
Australia: 15. Chris Latham, 14. Clyde Rathbone, 13. Stirling Mortlock, 12. Matt Giteau, 11. Lote Tuqiri, 10. Stephen Larkham, 9. George Gregan (c), 8. John Roe, 7. Phil Waugh, 6. George Smith, 5. Dan Vickerman, 4. Justin Harrison, 3. Al Baxter, 2. Jeremy Paul, 1. Bill Young – Replacements: 16. Brendan Cannon, 17. Matt Dunning, 18. Mark Chisholm, 19. David Lyons, 20. Elton Flatley, 21. Wendell Sailor, 22. Mat Rogers

13 November 2004

France	27–14	Australia
Try: Brusque, Michalak; Con: Élissalde; Pen: Élissalde 5		Try: Gregan; Pen: Flatley, Giteau 2

Stade de France, Paris
Attendance: 72,750
Referee: Chris White (England)

France: 15. Nicolas Brusque, 14. Aurélien Rougerie, 13. Tony Marsh, 12. Yannick Jauzion, 11. Cédric Heymans, 10. Frédéric Michalak, 9. Jean-Baptiste Élissalde, 8. Imanol Harinordoquy, 7. Olivier Magne, 6. Serge Betsen, 5. Jérôme Thion, 4. Fabien Pelous (c), 3. Sylvain Marconnet, 2. William Servat, 1. Olivier Milloud – Replacements: 16. Sébastien Bruno, 19. Julien Bonnaire, 20. Julien Peyrelongue, 22. Christophe Dominici – Unused: 17. Nicolas Mas, 18. Pascal Papé, 21. Clément Poitrenaud
Australia: 15. Chris Latham, 14. Clyde Rathbone, 13. Stirling Mortlock, 12. Matt Giteau, 11. Lote Tuqiri, 10. Stephen Larkham, 9. George Gregan (c), 8. John Roe, 7. Phil Waugh, 6. George Smith, 5. Dan Vickerman, 4. Justin Harrison, 3. Al Baxter, 2. Jeremy Paul, 1. Bill Young – Replacements: 17. Matt Dunning, 19. David Lyons, 20. Elton Flatley, 21. Wendell Sailor, 22. Mat Rogers – Unused: 16. Brendan Cannon, 18. Mark Chisholm

5 November 2004

French Barbarians (France)	15–47	Australia A

Stade Jean-Bouin, Paris

20 November 2004

Scotland	17–31	Australia
Try: Hogg; Pen: Paterson 4		Try: Giteau, Gregan; Tuqiri, Waugh; Con: Flatley, Giteau 3 Pen: Giteau

Hampden Park, Glasgow
Attendance: 28,000
Referee: Daniel Lewis (Ireland)

Scotland: 15. Hugo Southwell, 14. Chris Paterson, 13. Ben Hinshelwood, 12. Andrew Henderson, 11. Sean Lamont, 10. Dan Parks, 9. Chris Cusiter, 8. Jon Petrie, 7. Donnie Macfadyen, 6. Ally Hogg, 5. Nathan Hines, 4. Stuart Grimes, 3. Gavin Kerr, 2. Gordon Bulloch (c), 1. Allan Jacobsen – Replacements: 16. Robbie Russell, 17. Bruce Douglas, 18. Scott Macleod, 19. Jason White, 20. Mike Blair, 22. Graeme Morrison – Unused: 21. Gordon Ross
Australia: 15. Chris Latham, 14. Clyde Rathbone, 13. Stirling Mortlock, 12. Matt Giteau, 11. Lote Tuqiri, 10. Stephen Larkham, 9. George Gregan (c), 8. David Lyons, 7. Phil Waugh, 6. George Smith, 5. Dan Vickerman, 4. Justin Harrison, 3. Al Baxter, 2. Jeremy Paul, 1. Bill Young – Replacements: 16. Brendan Cannon, 17. Matt Dunning, 18. Radike Samo, 19. Stephen Hoiles, 20. Elton Flatley, 21. Wendell Sailor, 22. Mat Rogers

27 November 2004

England	19–21	Australia
Try: Cueto, Lewsey; Moody; Con: Tindall 2		Try: Latham, Paul; Con: Flatley; Pen: Giteau 3

Twickenham Stadium, London
Attendance: 73,000
Referee: Paul Honiss (New Zealand)

England: 15. Jason Robinson (c), 14. Mark Cueto, 13. Henry Paul, 12. Mike Tindall, 11. Josh Lewsey, 10. Charlie Hodgson, 9. Andy Gomarsall, 8. Martin Corry, 7. Lewis Moody, 6. Joe Worsley, 5. Steve Borthwick, 4. Danny Grewcock, 3. Julian White, 2. Steve Thompson, 1. Graham Rowntree – Replacements: 20. Harry Ellis, 21. Will Greenwood, 22. Ben Cohen – Unused: 16. Andy Titterrell, 17. Andrew Sheridan, 18. Ben Kay, 19. Andy Hazell
Australia: 15. Chris Latham, 14. Wendell Sailor, 13. Morgan Turinui, 12. Matt Giteau, 11. Lote Tuqiri, 10. Elton Flatley, 9. George Gregan (c), 8. David Lyons, 7. Phil Waugh, 6. George Smith, 5. Dan Vickerman, 4. Justin Harrison, 3. Al Baxter, 2. Jeremy Paul, 1. Bill Young – Replacements: 17. Matt Dunning, 19. Stephen Hoiles, 22. Mat Rogers – Unused: 16. Brendan Cannon, 18. Radike Samo, 20. Matt Henjak, 21. Drew Mitchell

== See also ==
- 2004 end-of-year rugby union tests
