= 2006 June rugby union tests =

The 2006 June rugby union tests (also known as the summer tests in the Northern Hemisphere) were rugby union Test matches played during between June in 2006. It saw several tests between touring Northern Hemisphere sides and home Southern Hemisphere sides, including a test series between Australia and England, Argentina and Wales, New Zealand and Ireland and South Africa and Scotland. France played Romania and the Springboks, while Italy played Fiji and Japan.

Most of the fixtures acted as end-of-season tours of the Northern Hemisphere nations, and pre season matches for the Tri Nations Series and Pacific 5 Nations for the Southern Hemisphere nations.

== Overview ==
=== Series ===
Tour	Result	Winners
Australia v England test series	2–0	Australia
Argentina v Wales test series	2–0	Argentina
New Zealand v Ireland test series	2–0	New Zealand
South Africa v Scotland test series	2–0	South Africa

=== Other tours ===
Team/Tour	Opponents
French tour	Romania (W) – South Africa (W)
Italian tour	Japan (W) – Fiji (L)

== Fixtures ==
10 June 2006
19:35 NZST (UTC+12)

New Zealand	34–23	Ireland
Try: Howlett; Muliaina; Flavell; Con: McAlister (2); Pen: McAlister (5)	Report	Try: O'Driscoll; Trimble; Con: O'Gara (2); Pen: O'Gara (3)

Waikato Stadium, Hamilton
Attendance: 29,850
Referee: Stuart Dickinson (Australia)

- The scoreline belied the closeness of the contest, as Ireland were 20 minutes away from a first-ever win over the All Blacks, holding a 23–15 lead halfway through the second half.

10 June 2006
15:00 SAST (UTC+02)

South Africa	36–16	Scotland
Try: Snyman; Paulse; Montgomery; Burger; Con: Montgomery (2); Pen: Montgomery (4)	Report	Try: Webster; Con: Paterson; Pen: Paterson (3)

ABSA Stadium, Durban
Attendance: 32,500
Referee: Donal Courtney (Ireland)

- This was Scotland's largest-ever defeat in South Africa.

11 June 2006
14:45 ART (UTC-03)

Argentina	27–25	Wales
Try: Leguizamón; Núñez Piossek; Leonelli; Con: Todeschini (3); Pen: Todeschini (2)	Report	Try: M. Jones; Evans; Hook; Con: Robinson (2); Pen: Robinson (2)

Estadio Raúl Conti, Puerto Madryn
Attendance: 15,000
Referee: Alain Rolland (Ireland)

- This was Argentina's first-ever Test in Patagonia. Puerto Madryn was the site where the first Welsh colonists arrived in Argentina, leading to the establishment of Y Wladfa in the 1860s.

11 June 2006
20:00 AEST (UTC+10)

Australia	34–3	England
Try: Latham; Gerrard; Blake; Con: Mortlock (2); Pen: Mortlock (5)		Pen: Barkley

Telstra Stadium, Sydney
Attendance: 62,124
Referee: Alan Lewis (Ireland)

11 June 2006
14:05 JST (UTC+09)

Japan	6–52	Italy
Pen: Ikeda (2)		Try: Sole; Bortolussi; Dallan; Mi. Bergamasco (2); Dellapè de Jager; Con: Pez (4); Bortolussi (3); Pen: Pez

Chichibunomiya, Tokyo
Attendance: 8,826
Referee: Scott Young (Australia)

17 June 2006
19:35 NZST (UTC+12)

New Zealand	27–17	Ireland
Try: Dermody; Kelleher; McAlister; Con: McAlister (3); Pen: McAlister (2)	Report	Try: Flannery; O'Connell; Con: O'Gara (2); Pen: O'Gara

Eden Park, Auckland
Attendance: 45,000
Referee: Jonathan Kaplan (South Africa)

17 June 2006
14:45 ART (UTC-03)

Argentina	45–27	Wales
Try: Tiesi (2); J. M. Fernández Lobbe; Con: Todeschini (3); Pen: Todeschini (8)	Report	Try: Delve; S. Williams; Byrne; Con: Robinson; Hook (2); Pen: Hook (2)

José Amalfitani Stadium, Buenos Aires
Attendance: 18,102
Referee: Dave Pearson (England)

- Argentina win a Test series against Wales for the first time.

17 June 2006
20:00 AEST (UTC+10)

Australia	43–18	England
Try: Smith; Gerrard (2); Tuqiri; Chisholm; Latham; Con: Mortlock (5); Pen: Mortlock		Try: Chuter; Varndell; Con: Goode; Pen: Goode; Drop: Goode

Telstra Dome, Melbourne
Attendance: 41,278
Referee: Steve Walsh (New Zealand)

- This was England's fifth consecutive Test defeat, their worst streak since 1984. Australia's George Gregan made his 120th international appearance, setting an all-time record for the sport.

17 June 2006
20:00 (UTC+12)

Fiji	29–18	Italy
Try: Ligairi; Caucaunibuca; Rauluni; Salabog; Con: Bai (3); Pen: Bai	Report	Try: Sole; Lo Cicero; Con: Pez; Pen: Pez (2)

Churchill Park, Lautoka
Attendance: 10,000
Referee: Marius Jonker (South Africa)

- Fiji claim a Six Nations scalp for the first time since 2000, when they defeated Italy (then newly admitted to the Six Nations), the last time the Azzurri visited Churchill Park.

17 June 2006
15:00 SAST (UTC+02)

South Africa	29–15	Scotland
Try: Du Preez; Pen: Montgomery (7); Van der Westhuyzen		Try: Macfadyen; Webster; Con: Paterson; Pen: Paterson

EPRFU Stadium, Port Elizabeth
Attendance: 35,000
Referee: Tony Spreadbury (England)

- Fullback Percy Montgomery became the first Springbok to score 600 Test points.

17 June 2006
18:00 EEST/GMT+03 (UTC+03)

Romania	14–62	France
Try: Fercu; Pen: Vlaicu (3)		Try: Jauzion; Martin; Dusautoir; Traille; Marconnet; Castaignède; Szarzewski; Laharrague; Marty; Con: Traille (6); Castaignède; Pen: Traille

Cotroceni Stadium, Bucharest
Attendance: 8,000
Referee: Bryce Lawrence (New Zealand)

24 June 2006
18:00 AWST (UTC+08)

Australia	37–15	Ireland
Try: Latham; Gerrard; Holmes; Gregan; Shepherd; Con: Mortlock (3); Pen: Mortlock (2)	Report	Try: O'Gara; Best; Con: O'Gara; Pen: O'Gara

Subiaco Oval, Perth
Attendance: 38,200
Referee: Kelvin Deaker (New Zealand)

24 June 2006
15:00 SAST (UTC+02)

South Africa	26–36	France
Try: Russell; Pen: Montgomery (7)	Report	Try: Heymans; Clerc (2); Traille; Con: Yachvili (2); Pen: Yachvili (2); Drop: Fritz; Traille

Newlands Stadium, Cape Town
Attendance: 52,000
Referee: Stuart Dickinson (Australia)

- South Africa suffered their first defeat at home since 2003. The result meant that the teams switched places in the world rankings, with France overtaking South Africa for second.

24 June 2006
20:40 ART (UTC-03)

Argentina	19–25	New Zealand
Try: Durand; Con: Todeschini; Pen: Todeschini (4)	Report	Try: Carter; MacDonald; Hamilton; Con: Carter (2); Pen: Carter (2)

José Amalfitani Stadium, Buenos Aires
Attendance: 37,000
Referee: Nigel Whitehouse (Wales)

== See also ==
- 2006 IRB Churchill Cup
- 2006 end-of-year rugby union tests
- 2006 France rugby union tour
- 2006 IRB Pacific 5 Nations
- 2006 IRB Nations Cup
- Mid-year rugby union test series
