= Mitchell Chapman =

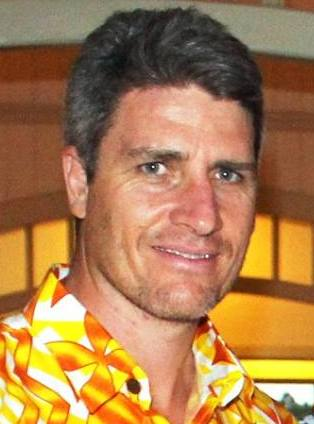
- Born: Mitchell Chapman; 15 March 1983 (age 43) Sydney, New South Wales, Australia
- Height: 1.97 m (6 ft 5 1/2 in)
- Weight: 110 kg (240 lb)
- School: The King's School, Sydney; Brisbane Grammar School

Rugby union career
- Position: Lock / Flank
Senior career
| Years | Team | Apps | (Points) |
| 2011–13 | NTT DoCoMo Red Hurricanes | 14 | (5) |
| 2014− | NSW Country Eagles | 4 | (5) |
- Correct as of 4 December 2014
Super Rugby
| Years | Team | Apps | (Points) |
| 2005–07 | Reds | 28 | (10) |
| 2008–11 | Brumbies | 40 | (10) |
| 2013– | Waratahs | 35 | (0) |
- Correct as of 28 June 2015
International career
| Years | Team | Apps | (Points) |
| 2001 | Australia Schoolboys | 5 | |
| 2003–04 | Australia U-21 | | |

Mitchell Chapman also Mitch, Mark, Chappo, Horse (born 15 March 1983, in Sydney), educated at The King's School, Sydney and Brisbane Grammar School, is an Australian Rugby Union player for NSW Waratahs in the Super Rugby competition. Chapman can play at Blindside Flanker, Lock, or Number 8.

Chapman represented Australia at under 21 level in 2003 and 2004 and captained the Australian schoolboys in 2001.

Chapman made his Super Rugby debut for the Queensland Reds in 2005.

A career highlight was his call up for the 2006 Wallabies Spring Tour to replace to injured Dan Vickerman. He also toured with the Wallabies in 2009. At the end of the 2007 Chapman transferred from the Queensland Reds to the ACT Brumbies.

He subsequently played with the NTT DoCoMo Red Hurricanes in Japan.

In January 2013, he signed with the Waratahs for the 2013 Super Rugby season. Chapman was expected to return to Australia to join the Waratahs in early February, following the completion of his Red Hurricanes season.

== Life outside rugby ==
During school his years, Chapman played cricket and represented Queensland at under 17 and 19 age groups. He lists other interests as golf, fishing, surfing and bird watching. In 2010 he completed a Bachelor of Commerce (finance) at the University of Southern Queensland.
