= Johann Muller (rugby union) =

South African rugby union player

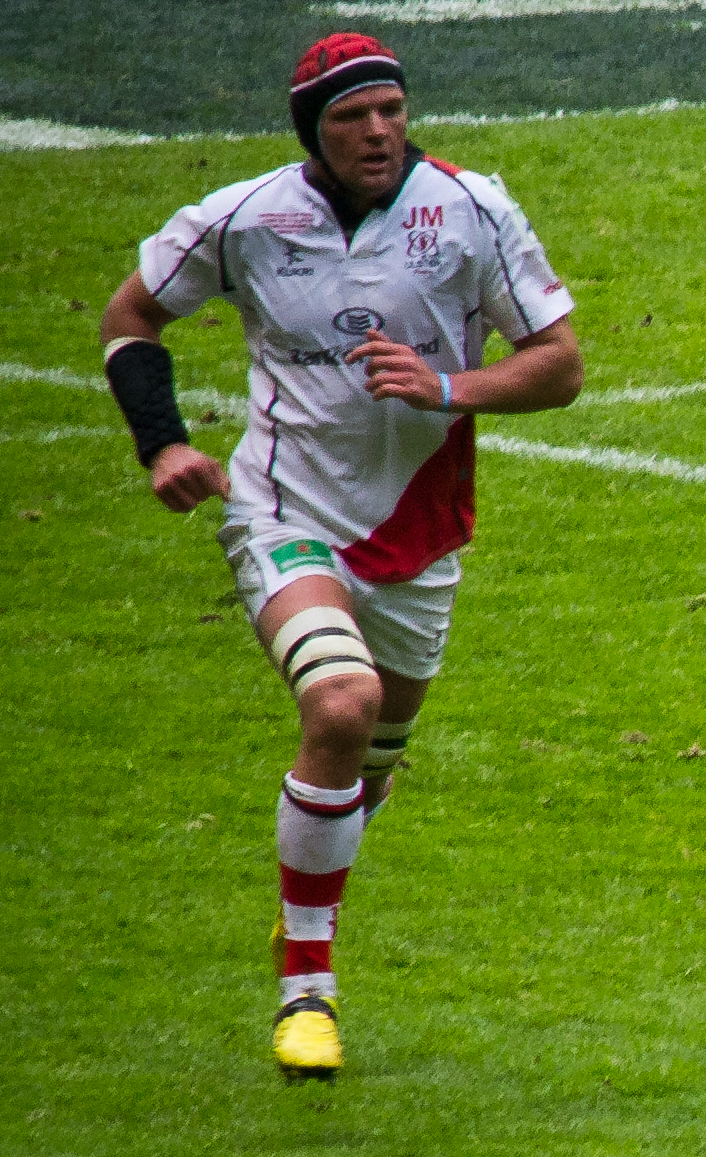
- Full name: Gysbert Johannes Muller
- Born: 6 January 1980 (age 46) Mossel Bay, South Africa
- Height: 2.00 m (6 ft 6 1/2 in)
- Weight: 112 kg (17 st 9 lb; 247 lb)
- School: Buffelsfontein Primary; Oakdale Agricultural College

Rugby union career
- Position: Lock
Senior career
| Years | Team | Apps | (Points) |
| 2001–2010 | Sharks (Currie Cup) | 38 | |
| 2002–2010 | Sharks | 82 | (10) |
| 2010–2014 | Ulster | 73 | (5) |
- Correct as of 8 January 2017
International career
| Years | Team | Apps | (Points) |
| 1999 | South Africa Under-19 | | |
| 2006–2011 | South Africa | 24 | (0) |
- Correct as of 8 January 2017

Gysbert Johannes Muller, more commonly known as Johann Muller (born 6 January 1980 in Mossel Bay, South Africa), is a South African former rugby union player. Muller played as a lock for the Sharks (Currie Cup), Sharks in (Super Rugby) and his country's national side Springboks, before he moved to Northern Ireland to play with Ulster in 2010, where became team captain, before retiring at the end of the 2013–2014 season.

== Career ==
Muller made his debut for the Springboks against Scotland in 2006 at ABSA Stadium. He would then earn a further 5 caps, 4 of which being as a member of the starting 15. Muller made his provincial debut in 2001 and his Super 14 debut the following year. Muller was selected into the Springboks squad for the 2007 home tests and the 2007 Tri Nations on the basis of a strong 2007 Super 14 performance.

=== 2007 Tri Nations ===
During the latter part of the competition, Springbok coach Jake White decided to rest his top players from touring Australia and New Zealand. White stated that the players that were taken on this tour would be playing for places in the Springboks 2007 Rugby World Cup squad. Muller was included in the squad chosen to tour.

He was named captain in the match against the All Blacks on 14 July 2007 after original tour captain Bob Skinstad was injured in the match against the Wallabies. Muller performed well in both matches. He was then rewarded with a place in the squad for the 2007 Rugby World Cup.

== Ulster Rugby ==
Johann Muller joined Ulster Rugby in 2010, where his solid performances saw him selected as the captain of the team. Though his regular game-time was diminishing due to the more regular onset of injury, he brought to the table his organisation skills and leadership. On 7 February 2014, it was announced that Johann Muller would retire at the end of the season.

Rugby Union Captain
| Preceded by Victor Matfield | Springbok Captain; 2007 | Next: Jean de Villiers |
