= Australia A =

Australia A may refer to:

- Australia A cricket team
- Australia A national rugby union team
