= Rodzilla =

Rodzilla may refer to:

- Nickname of Rodney Blake (born 1983), Tonga-born professional Australian rugby union footballer
- Nickname of Dennis Rodman (born 1961), former NBA player
