= Josh Valentine =

Australia international rugby union player (born 1983)

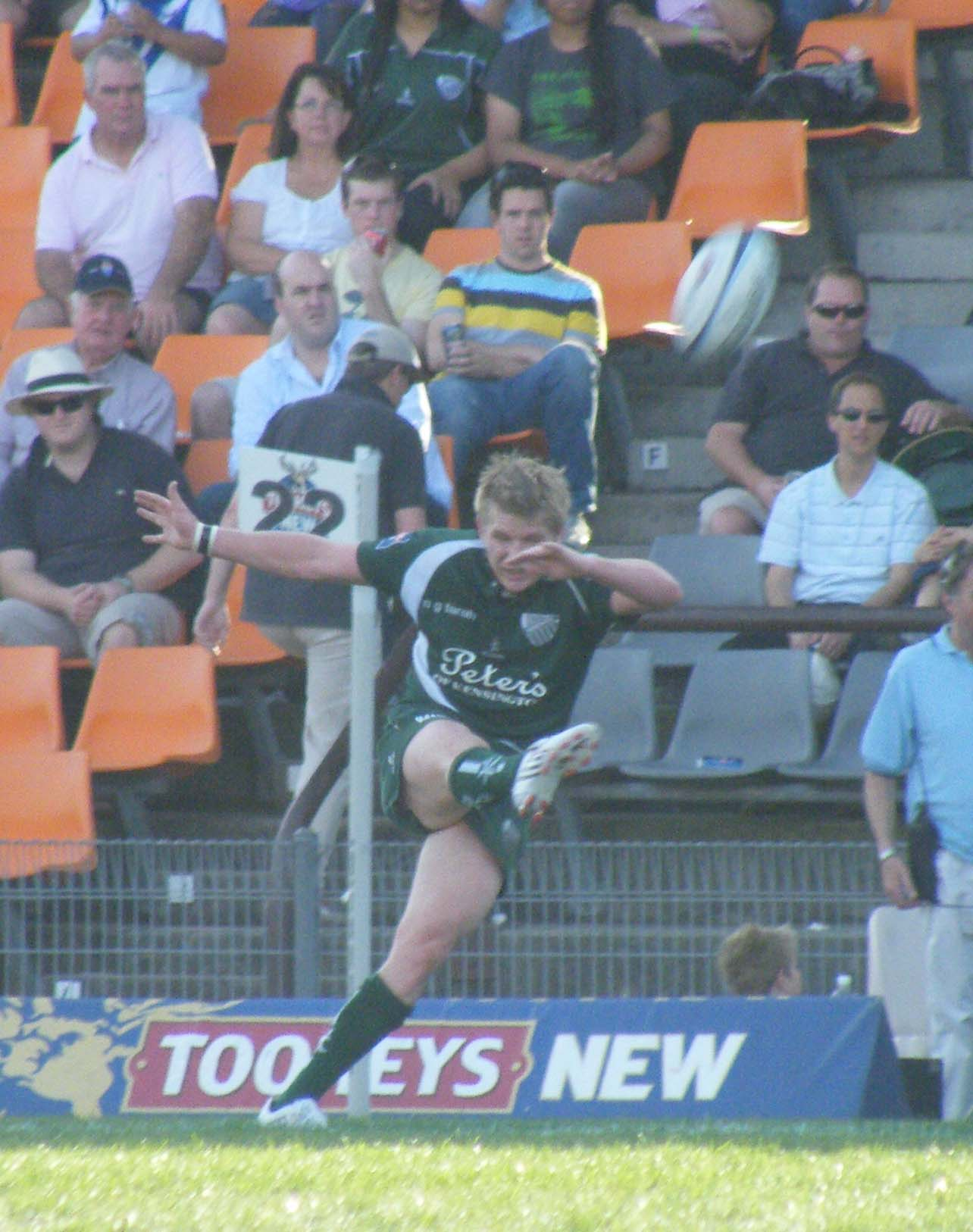
- Josh Valentine
- Born: 22 February 1983 (age 43) Newcastle, Australia
- Height: 177 cm (5 ft 10 in)
- Weight: 78 kg (12 st 4 lb)
- School: Singleton High School; Narrabeen Sports High School

Rugby union career
- Position: Scrum-half
Amateur team(s)
Years	Team	Apps	(Points)
- Singleton Bulls
Senior career
Years	Team	Apps	(Points)
2007	Sydney Fleet	1	(0)
2011-2024	RC Narbonne	88	(33)
2014-2023	Béziers	132	(45)
2018-2020	US Carcassonne	38	(5)
- Correct as of 11 February 2014
Super Rugby
Years	Team	Apps	(Points)
2003–2006	Queensland Reds	38	(20)
2007–2008	NSW Waratahs	13	(5)
2009	Western Force	12	(0)
2010–2011	Brumbies	25	(20)
International career
Years	Team	Apps	(Points)
- Australia Schoolboys
- Australia U-21
- Australia A
2006–09	Australia	6	(0)

Josh Valentine (born 22 February 1983 in Newcastle in New South Wales) is an Australian rugby union footballer. He currently plays for the US Carcassonne in France. Valentine's usual position is at scrum half.

== Career ==
Valentine played for the Singleton Bulls in his youth. He made his debut for the Queensland Reds against the Crusaders in 2003, he subsequently made his Super 12 debut that season against the Brumbies on his 20th birthday. That year he was named Reds' rookie of the year. At the end of the season, Valentine was named as vice-captain of Australia A, and toured Japan with them as well as participating in the Under 21 World Cup in England. The following year he played games for Australia A in France in November as well as playing for the national team in the under 21 World Cup in Scotland.

After a good season with the Reds in 2006, Valentine was included in the new coach, John Connolly's Wallaby squad. He came off the bench to earn his first Australian cap against England at Sydney's Telstra Stadium. In 2006, Valentine signed a two-year deal to join the New South Wales Waratahs, where he took up Waratahs captain Chris Whitaker's position. Valentine played with the Western Force for the 2009 season and with the ACT Brumbies for the 2010 and 2011 seasons. He has played with the RC Narbonne in France since 2012.
