= Laurie Fisher =

Australian rugby union coach

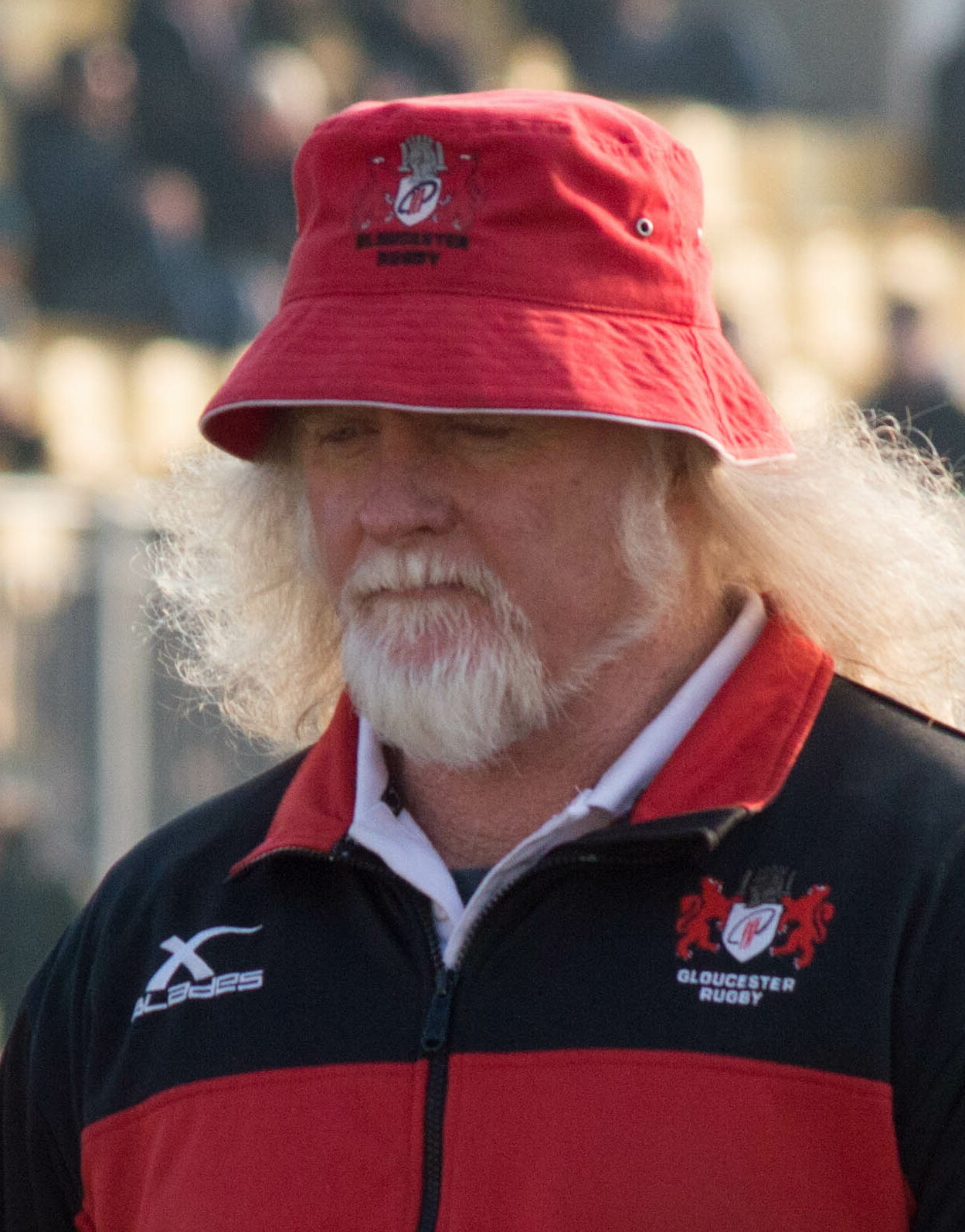
- Born: Lawrence Neil Fisher; 25 April 1958 (age 68) Canberra, ACT

Rugby union career
- Position: Loosehead Prop
Coaching career
- Years: Team
- –: ACT Brumbies
- –: UC Vikings
- –: Tuggeranong Vikings

Laurie Fisher (born 25 April 1958) is an Australian professional rugby union coach. He is currently the forwards coach of Super Rugby team the Brumbies and the Australian Wallabies.

== Early life and rugby career ==
Fisher was born in Canberra.

Rugby playing days:

- 1st Grade Australian National University in ACTRU senior competition 1977-79 & 1985-92 (as captain)
- 1st Grade University of Queensland in QRU senior competition 1980-84
- Member of ACT representative team 1985-92
- Represented Australian Universities v France 1990
- Captain of premiership-winning ANU 1st Grade team 1992.

== Coaching career ==
He began his coaching career with the Brumbies in 2000 when he was appointed head coach of the Brumbies Rugby Academy and later assumed control of the Brumby Runners and the Canberra Vikings. He implemented a rugby program aimed at developing the cream of local ACT rugby talent into players capable of competing for training contracts or full contracts with the Brumbies squad. Guy Shepherdson, Matt Giteau and Julian Salvi all made successful transitions to the professional game under his guidance.

In 2003, Fisher was promoted to the Brumbies forwards coach under David Nucifora and contributed to their success as 2004 Super 12 Champions.

Fisher's contribution and devotion to the Brumbies as an assistant coach saw them earn success from 2000 as semi finalists, two time finalists and two-time champions. As a head coach, Laurie failed to guide the Brumbies to any finals appearances. Midway through the 2008 season the Brumbies announced they would not be renewing his contract as head coach. Laurie was named forwards coach for Munster Rugby on 8 July 2008, with his experience in the Experimental Law Variations (ELVs) cited as a key reason for his appointment

Working full-time in sports, Fisher's career began as a physical education and health science teacher at Telopea Park School. After a decade of teaching, he moved into a Program Manager role at the Australian Institute of Sport.

In February 2011, Munster Rugby announced that Laurie Fisher would end his association with the Irish Province at the close of the current season. During his time at the Irish Provence, Munster won the Magners League title, contested two Heineken and one Magners League semi final, and they led the Magners League by nine points and continued their European campaign with an Amlin Challenge quarter final in April.

On 2 July 2014, Laurie Fisher would leave the Brumbies to join English team Gloucester Rugby as their new head coach. On 7 March 2017, Fisher left Gloucester by mutual consent.

He returned to the Brumbies in 2018 to take up an assistant coaching position.

For the 2022 Test season, he was also the Forwards Coach for the Australian Wallabies. In April 2024, under new head coach Joe Schmidt, he rejoined the Wallabies in the same role.

== Coaching honours ==
- Australian National University 1st Grade Coach in ACTRU senior competition.
- Brumby Runners/ACT President XV's head coach 1999 - 2001
- Awarded ACT Rugby Coach of the Year 1999
- Australian Universities Head Coach 2000 - 2002
- Brumbies Rugby Academy Head Coach 2000 - 2003
- Canberra Vikings Head Coach 2002 - 2003
- Awarded ACT Rugby Coach of the Year 2002
- Brumbies Forwards Coach 2003
- Brumby Runners Head Coach 2003
- Australia Under 21s Head Coach 2003–2004
- Brumbies Head Coach 2005–2008, 2014
- Gloucester Head Coach 2014–2017
- Brumbies Forwards Coach 2018-present
- Australia Forwards Coach 2022 and 2024-present
