= Brett Sheehan =

Australian rugby footballer

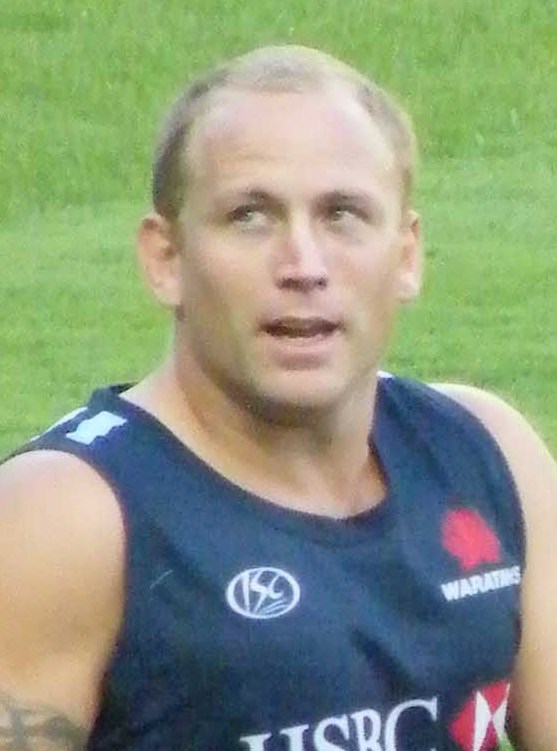

Personal information
- Born: Brett Russell Sheehan; 16 September 1979 (age 47) Geraldton, Western Australia, Australia
- Height: 1.73 m (5 ft 8 in)
- Weight: 92 kg (14 st 7 lb)

Playing information
- Position: Scrum-half
Club
Years	Team	Pld	T	G	FG	P
	Broncos
	Sea Eagles
2002	Rabbitohs	8				22
	Total	8	0	0	0	22

Rugby union career
- Position: Scrum-half
Senior career
Years	Team	Apps	(Points)
2007	Central Coast Rays	10	(24)
2014	London Wasps	4	(0)
2014–16	Narbonne	42	(10)
- Correct as of 12 February 2014
Super Rugby
Years	Team	Apps	(Points)
2005	Queensland Reds	4	(0)
2006–09	New South Wales Waratahs	43	(5)
2010–13	Western Force	43	(21)
- Correct as of 10 June 2013
International career
Years	Team	Apps	(Points)
2006–13	Australia	7	(0)
- Correct as of 25 November 2012

Brett Sheehan (born 16 September 1979) is an Australian rugby union and rugby league footballer. He was also included in Australia's squad for matches during the 2006 Tri Nations Series.

Sheehan previously played for the Queensland Reds, playing four Super 12 matches for them in 2005. He then moved back to Sydney to play for the Waratahs for the 2006 season. At the conclusion of the 2008 season, Sheehan announced that he would be moving to the Western Force franchise. He earned a call-up into the Wallaby squad, during the coaching era of John Connolly. Sheehan has also played rugby league in the past, having played for a number clubs in the National Rugby League, such as the Brisbane Broncos, Manly-Warringah Sea Eagles and South Sydney Rabbitohs.
