= Cameron Shepherd =

Australian rugby union player

- Born: Cameron Bernard Shepherd; 30 March 1984 (age 42) Windsor, England
- Height: 1.89 m (6 ft 2 1/2 in)
- Weight: 97 kg (15 st 4 lb)
- School: Barker College
- University: Macquarie University
- Notable relative: Patrick Shepherd

Rugby union career
- Position: Fullback / Wing
Senior career
Years	Team	Apps	(Points)
2007	Perth Spirit	5	(69)
2012–13	Sale Sharks	15	(10)
2013–	Honda Heat		
Super Rugby
Years	Team	Apps	(Points)
2004–05	Waratahs	18	(30)
2006–12	Western Force	60	(369)
International career
Years	Team	Apps	(Points)
2006–10	Australia	9	(19)

Cameron Shepherd (born 30 March 1984, Windsor, England) is a retired Australian rugby union footballer. He notably played for the Western Force in the international Super Rugby competition. His usual position is at fullback or wing.

== Biography ==
Shepherd was born in England but grew up in Sydney playing basketball and rugby for Beecroft Cherrybrook Rugby club and Barker College in the CAS competition. He would later sign with the New South Wales Waratahs. In 2003 Shepherd represented Australia at the under-21 level and the following year he played for Australia A. In 2005, Shephard signed a three-year deal with new franchise, the Western Force.

Following a successful season with the Force in their inaugural season in 2006, Shepherd was included in the Wallabies squad. He scored his first test try on 24 June, during the 2006 mid-year rugby test series against Ireland, at Subiaco Oval, which was previously the home ground of his Super 14 side, the Force.

On 9 September 2006 Shepherd received his first starting cap when he was selected on the wing for the Wallabies in the final test of the 2006 Tri Nations Series in South Africa.

Shepherd scored a conversion to his own try for the Force on the left touch-line after the siren on 9 March 2007 against the Hurricanes to record the first ever home win for the Force in the Super 14 competition. Before the try, the Force trailed 11–17, the try made the score 16-17 and the successful conversion resulted in an 18–17 win.

He was a member of the Australian squad at the 2007 Rugby World Cup and was selected at fullback for the final pool game against Canada in Bordeaux.

On 22 May 2012 it was announced that Shepherd had signed a contract with English Premiership side Northampton Saints for the 2012/13 season. However, this deal was later called off and he signed for Sale Sharks instead.
