= Rocky Elsom =

Australia international rugby union player

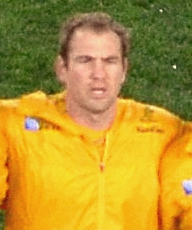
- Elsom in 2011
- Born: Rocky Dan Elsom; 14 February 1983 (age 43) Melbourne, Victoria, Australia
- Height: 1.97 m (6 ft 5 1/2 in)
- Weight: 112 kg (247 lb; 17 st 9 lb)
- School: St Joseph's Nudgee College

Rugby union career
- Position: Flanker
Senior career
Years	Team	Apps	(Points)
2003–2008	Waratahs	65	(50)
2008–2009	Leinster	21	(30)
2010–2011	Brumbies	14	(15)
2012	Waratahs	5	(0)
2012	Kobe Steelers	0	(0)
2013	Toulon	2	(0)
2014	Narbonne	4	(0)
- Correct as of 23 November 2014
International career
Years	Team	Apps	(Points)
1999	Australia U16		
2000	Australian Schoolboys	1	(0)
2005–2011	Australia	75	(70)
- Correct as of 16 October 2011
Medal record
Men's rugby union
Representing Australia
Rugby World Cup
Bronze medal – third place	2011 New Zealand	Squad

Rocky Dan Elsom (born 14 February 1983) is an Australian former rugby union player. He played in the back row, primarily a flanker and number eight. He was selected for 75 Test caps for Australia, captaining the side between 2009 and 2011, scoring 15 tries. He is the most-capped Australian blindside flanker. Elsom was the 76th Australian test captain, having replaced Stirling Mortlock in 2009 for two years.

Elsom is one of Australia's most decorated players, having won Herald Super 14 Player of the Year in 2007, Wallaby of the Year in 2008, European Player of the Year in 2009 and having been inducted into the European Cup Hall of Fame in 2010. He also holds the record for most tries by a Wallaby forward and is one of only a handful of Australians to win a Heineken Cup medal twice. Veteran Irish player Brian O'Driscoll once lauded Elsom as the best player in the world.

== Career ==
=== Early career ===
Elsom was born in Melbourne and was educated at St. Joseph's Nudgee College in Brisbane where he was captain of the school's 1st XV. He went on to make the Australian Schoolboys side, playing for Australia at under-16s and schoolboys level in the number eight position between 1999 and 2000.

=== Rugby League ===
Following Elsom's success on the schoolboy stage, he spent two seasons with the Canterbury-Bankstown Bulldogs rugby league club in Sydney and was a front-row prop in their 2001 premiership-winning Jersey Flegg Cup side. During that time he lived with fellow Bulldogs players including future test star Johnathan Thurston, Nate Myles, Roy Asotasi and dual-code international, Sonny Bill Williams, whom he would go on to meet on two occasions at Test level in rugby union. They resided in a Bulldogs-owned cottage called the 'Dog House' in Belmore.

=== Waratahs and Australia ===
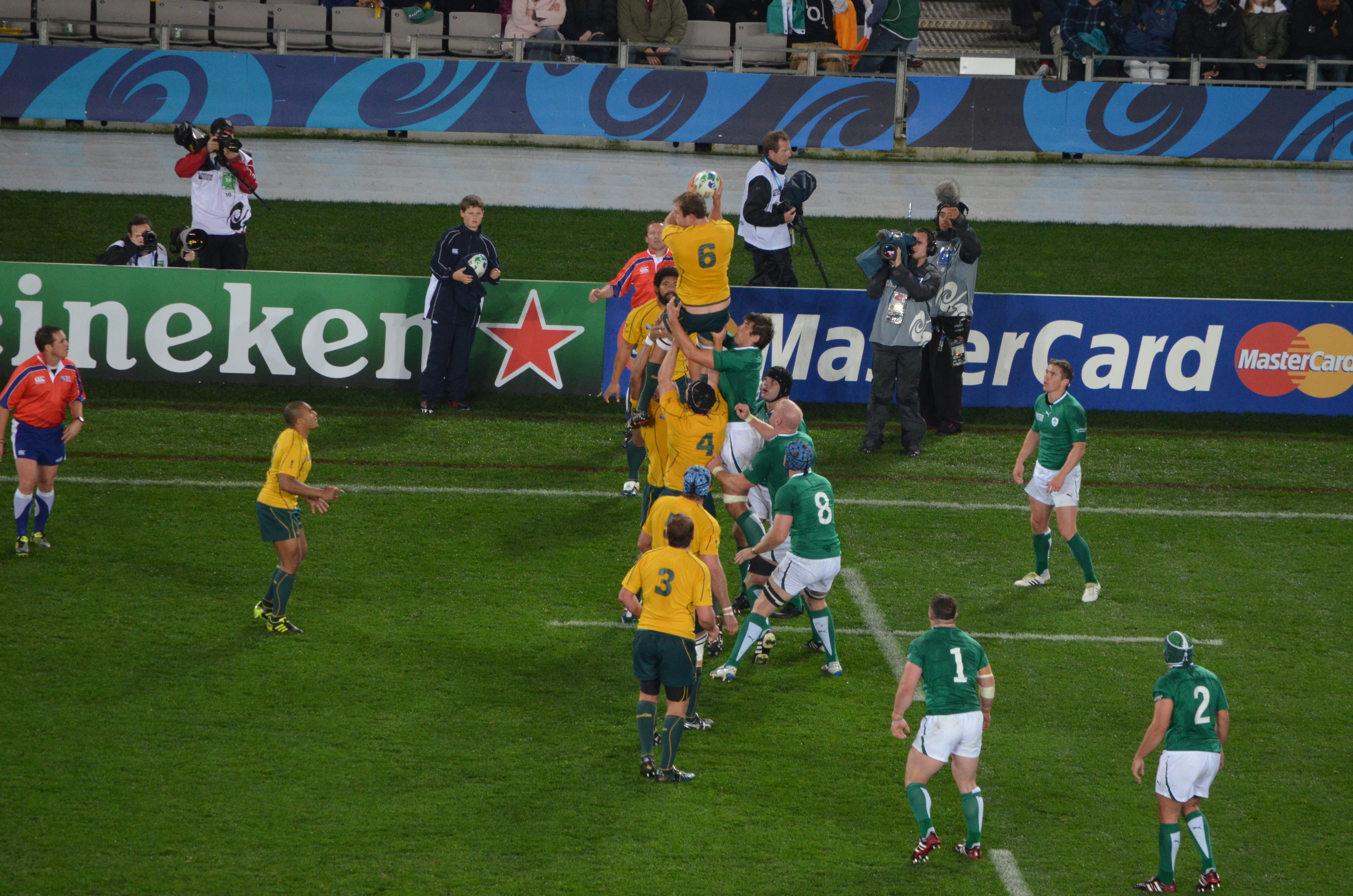
Elsom takes a lineout against Ireland at the 2011 Rugby World Cup

Elsom returned to rugby union in 2003, making his debut in Super Rugby against the Auckland Blues for the Waratahs. He also co-captained the Australian Under 21s at the 2003 under-21 World Cup.

Elsom continued to progress in the Australian rugby scene, featuring in 12 of the Waratahs 13 games during the 2005 season, which saw the side make it to the final, only to be defeated by the Crusaders. Elsom was selected as number six for the opening Wallaby test of 2005 against Samoa. He scored the opening try of the match and went on to hold his place as Australia's first choice number six despite strong competition. In 2005, Elsom re-signed with the Waratahs, which saw him stay at the New South Wales franchise until the end of the 2008 Super 14 season.

In March 2006, Elsom was suspended for four weeks for fighting with South African Prop Jaco Engels. The incident was in retaliation to Engels joining a fight between NSW Prop Matt Dunning and Richard Bands in a Super 12 Match in Pretoria. Englis and Dunning received 1 and 3 weeks suspension for their part in the incident, while Elsom's heftier ban was justified by repeated blows to the head of an opponent.

In 2007, Elsom was named captain of the Waratahs for their week 12 clash with the Highlanders in Sydney, his 50th appearance for the Waratahs. Elsom also received the Matt Burke Cup for the Waratahs in 2007 along with the Herald Award for the best performing Super 14 player of 2007 and the NSW Medal for outstanding contribution to New South Wales rugby. He was also named the most valuable flanker in Australia. In late 2007, Elsom played number eight for the Barbarians against South Africa where he scored an unforgettable try early in the second half which helped the Barbarians push past the World Champions South Africa.

In 2008, Elsom was awarded the 'Wallaby of the Year' after playing in all but one match of the Wallabies' Tri-nations tests and scoring a crucial try to defeat the All Blacks in Sydney. That year, Elsom signed a one-year deal with Irish provincial side Leinster to join them in September 2008.

=== Leinster ===
Elsom moved to Leinster in 2008, with a view to competing in the 2008–09 Heineken Cup. He was instrumental in Leinster winning their first title, awarded man of the match in two of the three playoff games, including the final, where he was credited with inspiring the pack to a 19–16 victory over the Leicester Tigers.

In 2009 Elsom was awarded Leinster Player of the Year, winning an unprecedented 70% of the popular vote. He was also voted European Player of the Year 2008–09, after Leinster won the Heineken Cup with three Man of the Match performances from Leinster's six wins. In the Magners League, Elsom picked up 11 Man of the Match awards from his last 13 outings and was judged the Magners League Player of the Year 2008–09, as well as being included in both Celtic and European "Dream Teams" along with fellow Leinster player Brian O'Driscoll.

Elsom was a massive physical presence in the pack, consistently breaking top level tackles. In May 2009, Elsom was named in the Barbarians squad for a second time to play England and Australia along with Leinster colleagues Gordon D'Arcy and Chris Whitaker.

=== Return to Australia ===
In June 2009, Elsom signed a two-year contract with the ACT Brumbies, citing his desire to resume his international career with the Wallabies as the deciding factor in his decision. Elsom joined the squad in 2010 on a two-year contract but injuries restricted him to just 13 appearances.

Elsom was picked in the 45-man Spring tour squad to Britain and Ireland in November 2009, and became Australia's 76th Test captain, replacing Stirling Mortlock. At the end of the tour, his captaincy record for the Wallabies stood at two wins (against England and Wales), two losses (against New Zealand and Scotland), and a draw against Ireland in which he scored a try at the 60th minute to put his team back in front.

In the first Bledisloe Cup Match of 2010, Elsom captained his side to a defeat, where the Wallabies managed to put 28 points on the All Blacks with only 14 men for more than 50 minutes of the game after Drew Mitchell was controversially sin binned. Elsom himself scored the last try for the Wallabies. He agreed to rejoin the NSW Waratahs on a one-year deal.

In 2012, Elsom was sacked by the Kobe Steelers for failing a medical test but successfully sued the club for breach of contract. The following year, Elsom signed with French Top 14 giants Toulon, following his release from the Waratahs. He later played for Narbonne in the Pro D2, playing for just one season and ultimately retiring following difficulty maintaining fitness due to injury.

== Post-playing career ==
In 2015, Elsom became the president of Pro D2 club Narbonne after an Australian consortium, FG Management, sold the club. Elsom, who purchased the club for €300k, acquired a 97% stake. Under Elsom's management, the club was restructured, and improved its results in the French second division, reportedly selling "overpaid" players. Relations between Elsom and the club's fans, however, deteriorated after he vetoed a potential acquisition offer from Qatari investors, whom had pitched the club for competitive success. Elsom left the club in 2016.

By 2024, Elsom was coaching at the Dublin private boys' school Catholic University School (CUS), which he said was used to occupy his time while doing rehab for a back injury.

== Legal issues ==
=== Narbonne fraud case ===
In October 2024, an international arrest warrant was issued for Elsom following a conviction for embezzlement in France, according to French media reports. A Narbonne court had found him guilty of forgery, use of forgery and misuse of corporate assets totaling €700k concerning his tenure as president of the Narbonne rugby club in the French Pro D2, ultimately leading to the club going into liquidation two years later, according to prosecutors. Elsom was convicted in absentia and given a five-year-prison sentence. Elsom denied wrongdoing in a statement following the decision, stating: "I would like to make it clear that I was not informed of this hearing and was not given the opportunity to defend myself against the allegations". He added that during his tenure at the club between 2013 and 2016, the club recorded solid profits and on-field results, including back-to-back season profits, its most wins in a season, the only recorded undefeated home season, and the highest annual attendance for a Pro D2 season. Elsom also asserted that he believed he had been scapegoated for the mismanagement of the club after he left.

In November 2024, Irish police visited Elsom's residence and workplace to execute a European arrest warrant and extradite him to France, although Elsom had fled the country. By March 2025, Elsom appealed a judgment by a French court which sentenced him to two years in prison for misusing corporate assets. He was subsequently acquitted on charges of forgery and use of forgery, but was ordered to pay €230k in compensation to the club's liquidator and fined €100k with half the sum suspended. By January 2026, Elsom was employed and residing in Cooroy, a rural town near the Sunshine Coast where his family owned a business.

In April 2026, Australian outlet Code Sports reported that financial statements showed Narbonne made profits during Elsom's last three years in charge of the club, with the year following his departure showing a loss. A criminal lawyer representing Elsom, Yann Le Bras, claimed the 2016 and 2017 financial reports were not introduced for analysis at the trial and financial statements for 2018, as well as the liquidator's report from the same year, were continuing to be withheld from the defence despite repeated requests for the prosecution to hand them over. Le Bras also told the outlet that Elsom's case was the most unfair judicial process he has witnessed in three decades of legal practice and insisted his client was never contacted about the charges he faced, never interviewed by police nor informed about the trial which then left him unrepresented in court two years prior.

As of 16 November 2026 the case is still ongoing.

== Awards and honours ==
Australia

- Rugby World Cup: 2011 (third-place)
- Tri Nations Series: 2011

Leinster

- European Rugby Champions Cup: 2008–09

Individual

- Waratahs Player of the Season (Matthew Burke Cup): 2007
- Leinster Rugby Player of the Year: 2009
- European Player of the Year: 2009

Preceded by George Smith	Australian national rugby union captain 2009–2011	Succeeded by James Horwill
