= Bob Skinstad =

South African rugby union player

Bobby Skinstad
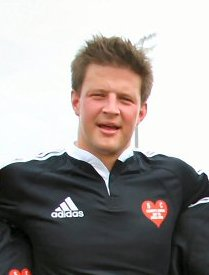
- Born: Robert Brian Skinstad; 3 July 1976 (age 50) Bulawayo, Rhodesia (now Zimbabwe)
- Height: 1.93 m (6 ft 4 in)
- Weight: 105 kg (16 st 7 lb; 231 lb)
- School: Hilton College, Hilton, KwaZulu-Natal, South Africa
- University: Stellenbosch University
- Occupation: Businessman

Rugby union career
- Position(s): Openside flanker, Number eight
Senior career
Years	Team	Apps	(Points)
2004	Newport RFC	9	(5)
2005–2006	Richmond		
- Correct as of 28 April 2007
Provincial / State sides
Years	Team	Apps	(Points)
1997–2000	Western Province		
2001–2003	Golden Lions		
2007	Sharks (Currie Cup)	3	(5)
Super Rugby
Years	Team	Apps	(Points)
1998–2000	Stormers	27	(45)
2001–2003	Cats	10	(13)
2007	Sharks	11	(5)
International career
Years	Team	Apps	(Points)
1997–2007	South Africa	42	(55)
- Correct as of 21 July 2007
National sevens team
Years	Team		Comps
- South Africa
- Correct as of 19 April 2007

Robert Brian Skinstad (born 3 July 1976) is a former professional rugby union player. Born in Rhodesia, he represented the South Africa national team, the Springboks, winning 42 caps. He played in the positions of flanker and number eight.

== Early life and education ==
Skinstad was born on 3 July 1976 in Bulawayo, Rhodesia. now Zimbabwe. He is of British and Irish descent, and his surname is of Norwegian origin. He lived in Kloof, KwaZulu-Natal, while he attended Highbury Preparatory School in the nearby town of Hillcrest. He also attended Fores in Rondebosch, before boarding at Hilton College. His university studies took him to Stellenbosch University where he lived in the Simonsberg men's residence and captained the "Maties" (university) 1st side.

== Early career ==
Skinstad was selected by Western Province for the Currie Cup and Super 12, and went on to captain both sides. He then moved to Johannesburg and played the 2003 season for the Golden Lions (Currie Cup) and the Cats (Super 12) before leaving for the United Kingdom.

Skinstad was eligible to represent three countries at international level: Zimbabwe, South Africa and Ireland. His mother is from County Louth and he holds an Irish passport.

== International career ==
Having represented South Africa at all levels, including captaining the under-21 Springbok side in 1996 and 1997, and playing for the SA Sevens team in 1997, Skinstad made his début for the Springboks as a replacement on 29 November 1997 against England. In all he played 42 tests for the Springboks, scoring 11 tries.

His inclusion in the 1999 World Cup squad was controversial in South Africa, as successful captain Gary Teichmann was left out. Although South Africa finished third in the competition there were many who believed that Teichmann should have been retained as captain for the tournament. Skinstad carried a leg injury into the competition, and made little impression.

Skinstad captained South Africa in 12 tests, from 24 October 2003. He missed the 2003 World Cup due to an arm injury.

== Semi-retirement in Britain ==
In January 2004 Skinstad terminated his contract with SA Rugby and signed with Welsh club Newport Gwent Dragons, for whom he played nine games. He then worked with a group, including businessmen Johann Rupert and Wayne Huizenga, trying to take over an English club in London, and played part-time for Richmond in England's London South-East Division 1.

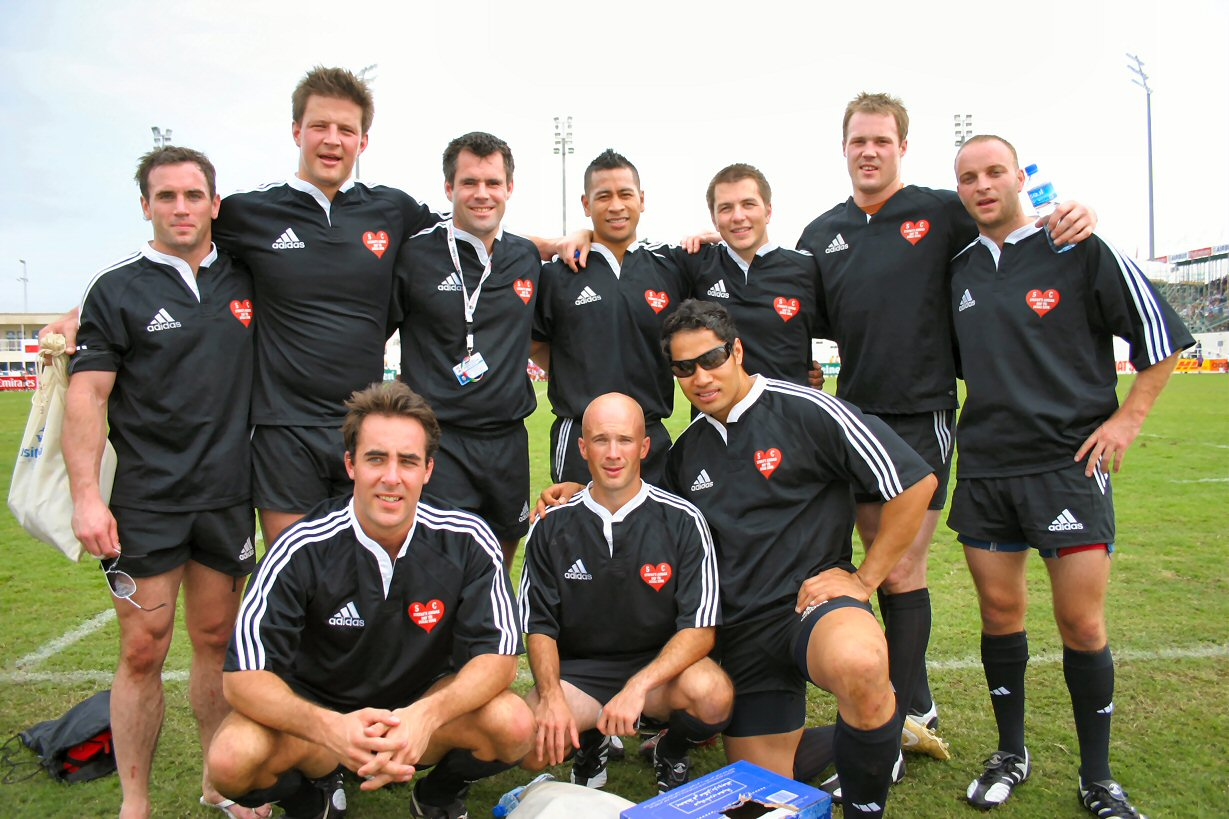
Dubai Sevens - Stefan Czerpak BHF Team. Skinstad is in the back row, 2nd from the left.

Skinstad started his own sports management company, Esportif, as a joint venture with Saatchi & Saatchi based in their London headquarters.

== Return to South Africa ==
After months of speculation about a return to professional rugby, Skinstad returned to Super 14 rugby in 2007 playing for the Sharks. He made his return coming off the bench against the Highlanders in New Zealand, and went on to make another 9 appearances, including a substitute's role in the final.

He was rewarded with a recall to the Springbok training camp in May 2007, and when Danie Rossouw was taken ill, Skinstad was named on the bench for the second test against England on 2 June. He was then chosen as captain for the Springboks' 2007 Tri Nations match against Australia on 7 July, when coach Jake White rested several senior players in preparation for the World Cup. An inexperienced South Africa side took a surprising 17–0 lead before fading to lose 25–17. Despite suffering a broken rib in the Australia match, Skinstad's comeback was capped off on 21 July with selection to the South Africa squad for the 2007 Rugby World Cup. He played and captained one full game in South Africa's winning campaign, and made three appearances as a substitute.

Skinstad retired from professional rugby on 6 November 2007.

== Post rugby career ==
On 21 October 2013, Skinstad was appointed as Tourism Brand Ambassador for the Cape Whale Coast region in the Western Cape, South Africa.

In 2024 he was part of a consortium that bought French Pro D2 club Béziers, where he is now co-president and owner.

== Honours ==
- Currie Cup: (with Western Province) Winner 1997, 2000, 2001. Finalist 1998
- Super Rugby (with Sharks): Finalist 2007.
- Tri-Nations: (with South Africa) Winner 1998
- World Cup (with South Africa): Winner 2007. 3rd place 1999

Sporting positions
Preceded by André Vos	Springbok Captain; 2001–2002 & 2007	Succeeded by John Smit
