= Guy Shepherdson =

Australia international rugby union player

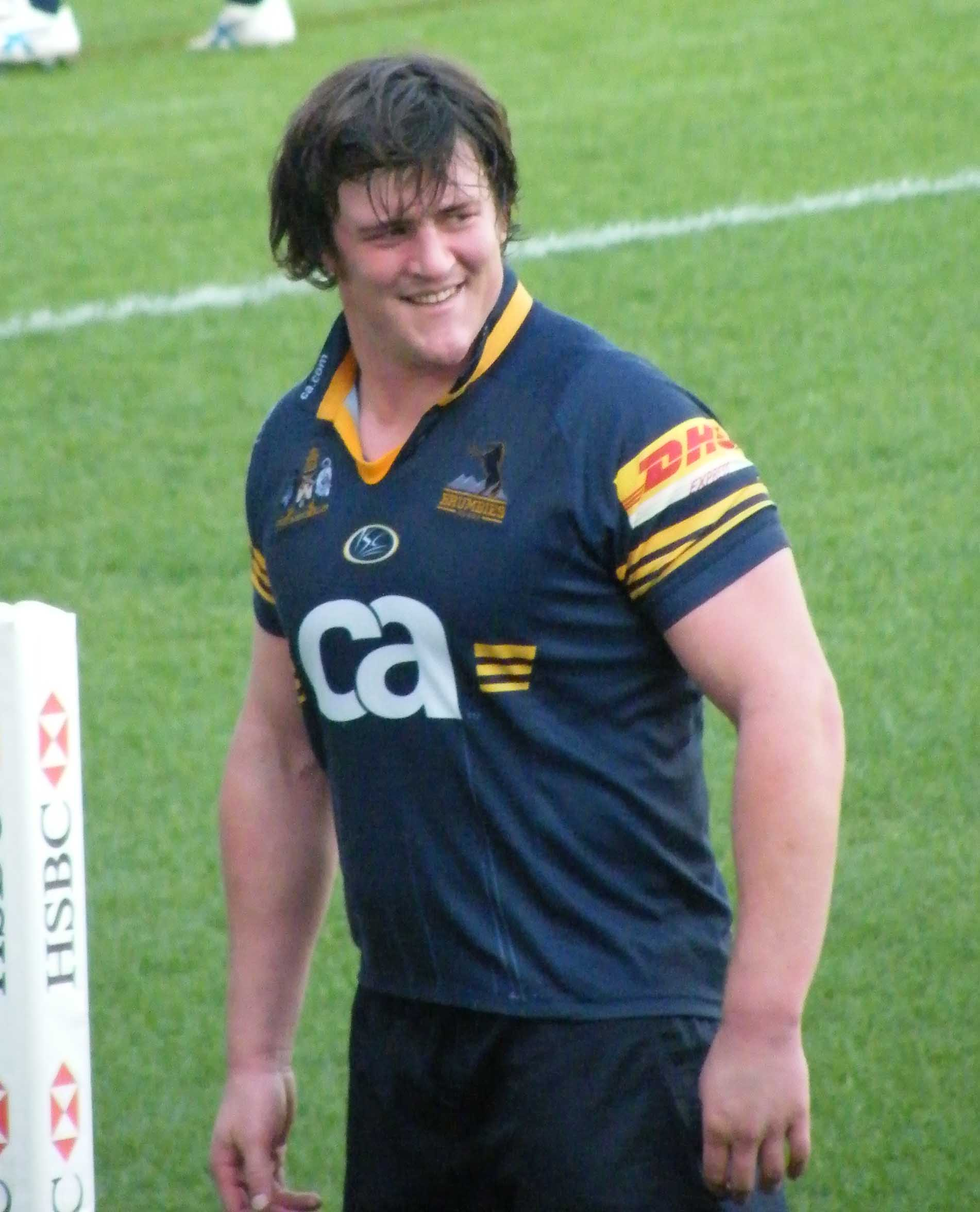
- Born: Guy Shepherdson; 17 February 1982 (age 44) Jakarta, Indonesia
- Height: 1.88 m (6 ft 2 in)
- Weight: 117 kg (18 st 6 lb)

Rugby union career
- Position: Tighthead Prop
- Current team: Southern Districts R. C
Senior career
Years	Team	Apps	(Points)
2004–present	Easts (Canberra)	33	(0)
Provincial / State sides
Years	Team	Apps	(Points)
2002–2003	Bay of Plenty		
Super Rugby
Years	Team	Apps	(Points)
2004–2010	Brumbies	69	(0)
2011–2012	Reds	4	(0)
- Correct as of 1 June 2012
International career
Years	Team	Apps	(Points)
2006–2007	Australia	17	(5)

Guy Shepherdson (born 17 February 1982 in Jakarta, Indonesia) is an Australian former rugby union professional footballer. He played as a tight-head prop for the Brumbies and Reds in the Super Rugby competition and played for the Australian national team, the Wallabies.

== Early life ==
Shepherdson was born in Jakarta as his father worked as an aid official for the Australian International Development Assistance Bureau (AIDAB), now known as AusAID from 1981 to 1983.

The family then moved to Canberra and Shepherdson was educated at Canberra Grammar School. He was a member of the Brumbies Academy squad in 1997. He played for the Australian Schoolboys in 1999 and went on to represent Australia at the under-19 and under-23 level.

== Rugby career ==
Shepherdson completed two stints with the Bay of Plenty in the National Provincial Championship in New Zealand. He then signed with the Brumbies for the 2004 season. Shepherdson made his Super 12 debut for the Brumbies in 2004, against the Auckland Blues in Canberra. He went on to earn another 13 caps for the Brumbies during that season.

He was included in new Australian coach John Connolly's squad for the Wallabies' 2006 mid-year rugby test series. He went on to make his international debut on 24 June, against Ireland at Subiaco Oval in Perth. He was chosen to anchor Australia's scrum at the 2007 Rugby World Cup in France.

In June 2010 he agreed to join the Queensland Reds for the 2011 Super 15 season. He retired from professional rugby at the end of 2012.
