= Australia A national rugby union team =

Australia A
- Union: Rugby Australia
- Emblem: Wallaby
- Coach: Stephen Larkham (2026)
- Captain: Matt Faessler (2026)
1st kit	2nd kit

Largest win
- Australia A 90–7 Tonga (North Sydney, Australia; 22 June 2008)

Largest defeat
- Junior All Blacks 50–0 Australia A (Dunedin, New Zealand; 16 June 2007)

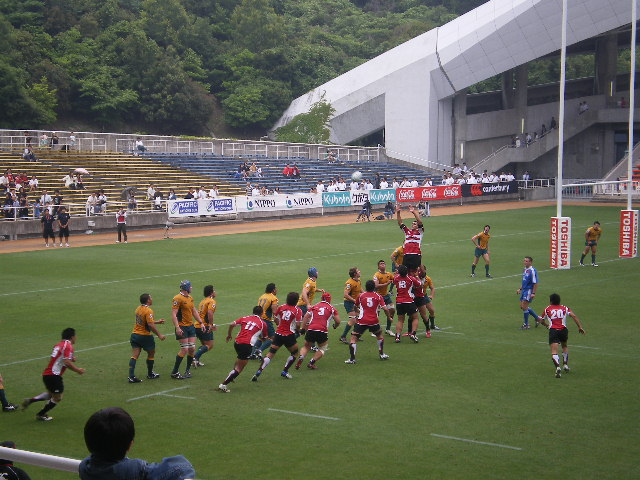
Australia A plays Japan in the 2008 Pacific Nations Cup at Level-5 Stadium in Fukuoka

Australia A, also known as Australia XV, is Australia's second national rugby union team, behind the Australia national team (Wallabies).

== History ==
Officially formed in 2001 as part of the 2001 British & Irish Lions tour to Australia, Australia A played host to the British & Irish Lions in a mid-week game and offered fringe Wallabies players a chance to impress the national selectors ahead of the test series. Australia A won the match 28–25, inflicting the Lions' first loss of the tour.

Australia A next formed in 2003 as part of the 2003 Rugby World Cup warm-ups and 2003 June rugby union tests, where they faced Japan in back-to-back matches coming away with two victories in Osaka and Tokyo. Up until 2004, Australia A was used as a team to offer touring teams a chance to play mid-week matches or developing rugby nations a chance to play stronger opposition to maintain non-test match status. However, in November 2004, Australia A was used when the Wallabies toured Europe, whereby they played the French Barbarians in the lead up to the national sides meeting later on tour in Paris.

By 2005, Australia A had won every match they had played in, but after playing the Junior All Blacks (the All Blacks second team at the time) in 2005, their unbeaten run came to an end, losing 23–19 in Canberra.

In 2006, Australia was originally invited to take part in the inaugural IRB Pacific Nations Cup but decided against sending a team, stating a need to focus on domestic competition. However, Australia did however host two games in the opening stages of the 2006 tournament, where Bluetongue Central Coast Stadium hosted Tonga vs Fiji and later Tonga vs Samoa. Australia A later played two matches against Fiji after the 2006 tournament, and then joined the competition in 2007.

In the 2007 Pacific Nations Cup, Australia A played 5 matches for 3 wins, 1 draw, and 1 loss. The team finished second in the tournament won by the Junior All Blacks.

In the 2008 Pacific Nations Cup, Australia A played 5 matches for 4 wins and 1 loss. The team finished second in the tournament won by New Zealand Māori. At the end of the 2008, however, the Australian Rugby Union decided to scrap the Australia A team, citing financial constraints. Australia withdrew from the 2009 tournament.

Despite withdrawing from the Australia A programme, between 2009 and 2010, Australia fielded several XV sides against Home Nations clubs, and although not officially titled Australia A, the side was often referred to it with these games used for fringe Wallabies players. For the 2010 England tour to Australia, the ARU arranged for the Australian Barbarians Rugby Club to play two matches against the visiting England national team. This side was nominated as the second national team and was, as such, essentially Australia A by another name for the England matches. The Australian Barbarians also played a pre-World Cup friendly against Canada in 2011.

Australia XV also returned in 2016, when they played against the French Barbarians during the Wallabies Spring tour. The side was selected from a handful of fringe players and with the team not being the official Wallabies side, the selectors were able to select players from outside the Australian Rugby Union selection policy and chose players based in Europe.

In February 2020, Rugby Australia had hinted at a possible return of the Australia A side where they would face Tier 2 opposition to strengthen the sides. However, any possible plans where paused due the COVID-19 pandemic, and in May 2022 having not formally participated in any event since 2008, the Australia A team was reignited by Rugby Australia to compete in the Pacific Nations Cup for July 2022 against Fiji, Samoa and Tonga, to take place in Fiji.

In 2024, Rugby Australia confirmed that Australia A will return (under the 'Australia XV' name) as they announced games against Bristol and England A. The program also expanded into the women's program, with the governing body announcing the first-ever women's Australia A side as a development team for Super Rugby Women's players transitioning to the Australia women's national rugby union team. The side would play their first ever match in 2024 against Samoa, losing 20–17.

In 2025, Rugby Australia announced that Australia A will play one game against Japan XV in October as a warm up leading up to the Wallabies test against Japan later in the month.

== Matches against international sides ==
- Scores highlighted in red color denoted a loss.
- Home team's score listed first.
- These results denote being against non-provincial international opposition, played under the moniker of Australia A, Australia B, Australia XV, or Wallaby XV.

=== Men ===
Date	Venue	Opponent	Score	Notes	Competition
6 August 1991	Ballymore Stadium, Brisbane	New Zealand 'B'	15–21		1991 New Zealand rugby union tour of Australia
19 June 2001	Central Coast Stadium, Gosford	British & Irish Lions	28–25		2001 British & Irish Lions tour of Australia
5 June 2003	Nagai Stadium, Osaka	Japan	5–63		
8 June 2003	Chichibunomiya Stadium, Tokyo	Japan	15–66		
5 November 2004	Stade Jean-Bouin, Paris	French Barbarians	15–47		2004 Australian tour of Europe
26 June 2005	Canberra Stadium, Canberra	Junior All Blacks	19–23		
1 July 2005	Sydney Football Stadium Sydney	Junior All Blacks	31–34		
1 November 2005	Stade Chaban-Delmas, Bordeaux	French Barbarians	12–42		2005 Australian tour of Europe
15 July 2006	Adelaide Oval, Adelaide	Fiji	47–18		
22 July 2006	Olympic Park Stadium, Melbourne	Fiji	80–9		
15 November 2006	Thomond Park, Limerick	Ireland A	17–24		2006 Australian tour of Europe
21 November 2006	McDiarmid Park, Perth	Scotland A	20–44		2006 Australian tour of Europe
25 May 2007	Sydney Football Stadium, Sydney	Tonga	60–15		2007 Pacific Nations Cup
2 June 2007	Coffs Stadium, Coffs Harbour	Samoa	27–15		2007 Pacific Nations Cup
9 June 2007	Willows Sports Complex, Townsville	Japan	71–10		2007 Pacific Nations Cup
16 June 2007	Carisbrook, Dunedin	Junior All Blacks	50–0		2007 Pacific Nations Cup
23 June 2007	ANZ National Stadium, Suva	Fiji	14–14		2007 Pacific Nations Cup
8 June 2008	Hakatanomori Stadium, Fukuoka	Japan	21–42		2008 Pacific Nations Cup
14 June 2008	Apia Park, Apia	Samoa	15–20		2008 Pacific Nations Cup
22 June 2008	North Sydney Oval, North Sydney	Tonga	90–7		2008 Pacific Nations Cup
29 June 2008	Ballymore Stadium, Brisbane	Fiji	50–13		2008 Pacific Nations Cup
5 July 2008	Sydney Football Stadium, Sydney	New Zealand Māori	18–21		2008 Pacific Nations Cup
24 November 2016	Stade Chaban-Delmas, Bordeaux	French Barbarians	19–11 (Note: Also known as Wallaby XV.)		2016 November international
30 October 2020	TG Millner Field, Sydney	Argentina	15–19		2020 Tri Nations series warm-up match
7 November 2020	TG Millner Field, Sydney	Argentina	24–57		2020 Tri Nations series warm-up match
2 July 2022	ANZ National Stadium, Suva	Samoa	26–31		2022 Pacific Nations Cup
9 July 2022	Churchill Park, Lautoka	Fiji	18–32		2022 Pacific Nations Cup
16 July 2022	Churchill Park, Lautoka	Tonga	22–39		2022 Pacific Nations Cup
1 October 2022	Chichibunomiya Stadium, Tokyo	Japan XV	22–34		2022 Autumn Internationals
8 October 2022	Best Denki Stadium, Fukuoka	Japan XV	21–22		2022 Autumn Internationals
14 October 2022	Yodoko Sakura Stadium, Osaka	Japan XV	52–48		2022 Autumn Internationals
14 July 2023	Teufaiva Sport Stadium, Nukuʻalofa	Tonga	27–21		2023 RWC warm-up
27 August 2023	Stade Jules-Ladoumègue, Brou-sur-Chantereine, France	Portugal	17–30		2023 RWC warm-up
17 November 2024	Twickenham Stoop, London	England A	38–17		2024 Autumn Internationals
18 October 2025	Yodoko Sakura Stadium, Osaka	Japan XV	7–71		2025 Autumn Internationals
25 October 2026	Geodis Park Stadium, Nashville	United States	12–61		2026 Autumn Internationals
31 October 2026	Sports Illustrated Stadium, Harrison	United States	0–52		2026 Autumn Internationals

==== Overall ====
Opponent	Played	Won	Lost	Drawn	% Won
All Blacks XV	4	0	4	0	0%
Argentina	2	0	2	0	0%
British & Irish Lions	1	1	0	0	100%
England A	1	0	1	0	0%
Fiji	5	5	0	0	100%
French Barbarians	3	2	1	0	66.67%
Ireland A	1	1	0	0	100%
Japan	4	4	0	0	100%
Japan XV	4	3	1	0	75%
New Zealand Māori	1	0	1	0	0%
Portugal	1	1	0	0	100%
Samoa	3	2	1	0	66.67%
Scotland A	1	1	0	0	100%
Tonga	4	3	1	0	75%
United States	2	2	0	0	100%
Total	37	25	12	0	67.57%

Updated: 2 November 2026

==== Other matches ====
- Other non-international matches played as Australia, Australia XV, Wallaby XV, Australia A or Australia 'B' when selected as the second national team. This does not include matches involving the Australian Barbarians.

Date	Moniker	Venue	Opponent	Score	Winner	Competition
1 November 2006	Australia XV	Swansea Stadium, Swansea	Ospreys	24–16	Ospreys	2006 Australian tour of Europe
3 November 2009	Australia XV	Kingsholm Stadium, Gloucester	(England) Gloucester	5–36	Australia A	2009 Autumn Internationals
24 November 2009	Australia XV	Cardiff City Stadium, Cardiff	(Wales) Cardiff Blues	3–31	Australia A	2009 Autumn Internationals
9 November 2010	Australia	Welford Road Stadium, Leicester	(England) Leicester Tigers	15–26	Australia A	2010 European Tour
16 November 2010	Australia	Thomond Park, Limerick	(Ireland) Munster	15–6	(Ireland) Munster	2010 European Tour
8 November 2024	Australia XV	Ashton Gate, Bristol	(England) Bristol Bears	10–10	draw	2024 Autumn Internationals

== Squad ==
On 12 October, a 27-player squad was named for Australia A's match against the United States.

On 15 October, Zac Lomax and Harry McLaughlin-Phillips replaced Tom Lynagh in the squad who withdrew due to injury.

On 26 October, Edwin Langi replaced Rhys van Nek in the squad who withdrew due to a failed head injury assessment in the first match.

Players in bold are players capped by the main national team.

Head Coach: (Australia) Stephen Larkham

Forwards
Player	Position	Franchise
Ethan Dobbins	Hooker	Waratahs
**Matt Faessler** (c)	Hooker	Reds
**Lachlan Lonergan**	Hooker	Brumbies
Lington Ieli	Prop	Brumbies
Tom Lambert	Prop	Reds
Edwin Langi	Prop	Waratahs
**Zane Nonggorr**	Prop	Reds
**Tom Robertson**	Prop	Force
Rhys van Nek	Prop	Brumbies
**Miles Amatosero**	Lock	Waratahs
Eamon Doyle	Lock	Waratahs
**Nick Frost**	Lock	Brumbies
Joe Brial	Loose forward	Reds
Will Harris	Loose forward	Force
Toby Macpherson	Loose forward	Brumbies
**Luke Reimer**	Loose forward	Brumbies
Rory Scott	Loose forward	Brumbies

Backs
Player	Position	Franchise
Nathan Hastie	Scrum-half	Force
**Kalani Thomas**	Scrum-half	Reds
**Tane Edmed**	Fly-half	Force
**Tom Lynagh**	Fly-half	Reds
**Harry McLaughlin-Phillips**	Fly-half	Reds
David Feliuai	Centre	Brumbies
Kadin Pritchard	Centre	Brumbies
Lachie Anderson	Outside back	Reds
Mac Grealy	Outside back	Force
Zac Lomax	Outside back	Force
**Dylan Pietsch**	Outside back	Force
Tim Ryan	Outside back	Reds
**Corey Toole**	Outside back	Brumbies

== List of Coaches ==
- (Australia) Eddie Jones (2001, vs. British & Irish Lions tour)
- (Australia) Adrian Thompson (2003, vs. Japan)
- (Australia) Eddie Jones (2004, vs. French Barbarians)
- (Australia) Ewen McKenzie (2005, vs. Junior All Blacks)
- (Australia) Eddie Jones (2005, vs. French Barbarians)
- (Australia) Laurie Fisher (2006, vs. Fiji)
- (Australia) John Connolly (2006 European Tour)
- (Australia) Laurie Fisher (2007, Pacific Nations Cup)
- (Australia) Phil Mooney (2008 Pacific Nations Cup)
- (New Zealand) Robbie Deans (2009 European Tour)
- (New Zealand) Robbie Deans (2010 England Series)
- (New Zealand) Robbie Deans (2010 European Tour)
- (Australia) Scott Wisemantel (2016, vs. French Barbarians)
- (Australia) Jason Gilmore (2022 Pacific Nations Cup & Japan tour)
- (Australia) Jason Gilmore (2023 Rugby World Cup warm-up matches)
- (Australia) Rod Seib (2024 Northern tour)
- (New Zealand) Simon Cron (2025, vs. Japan XV)
- (Australia) Stephen Larkham (2026, vs. United States)

== See also ==
- Australia national rugby union team
- Australian Barbarians
- Australia national rugby sevens team
- Australia women's national rugby union team
- Australia women's national rugby sevens team
