= Rodney Blake =

Australia international rugby union player

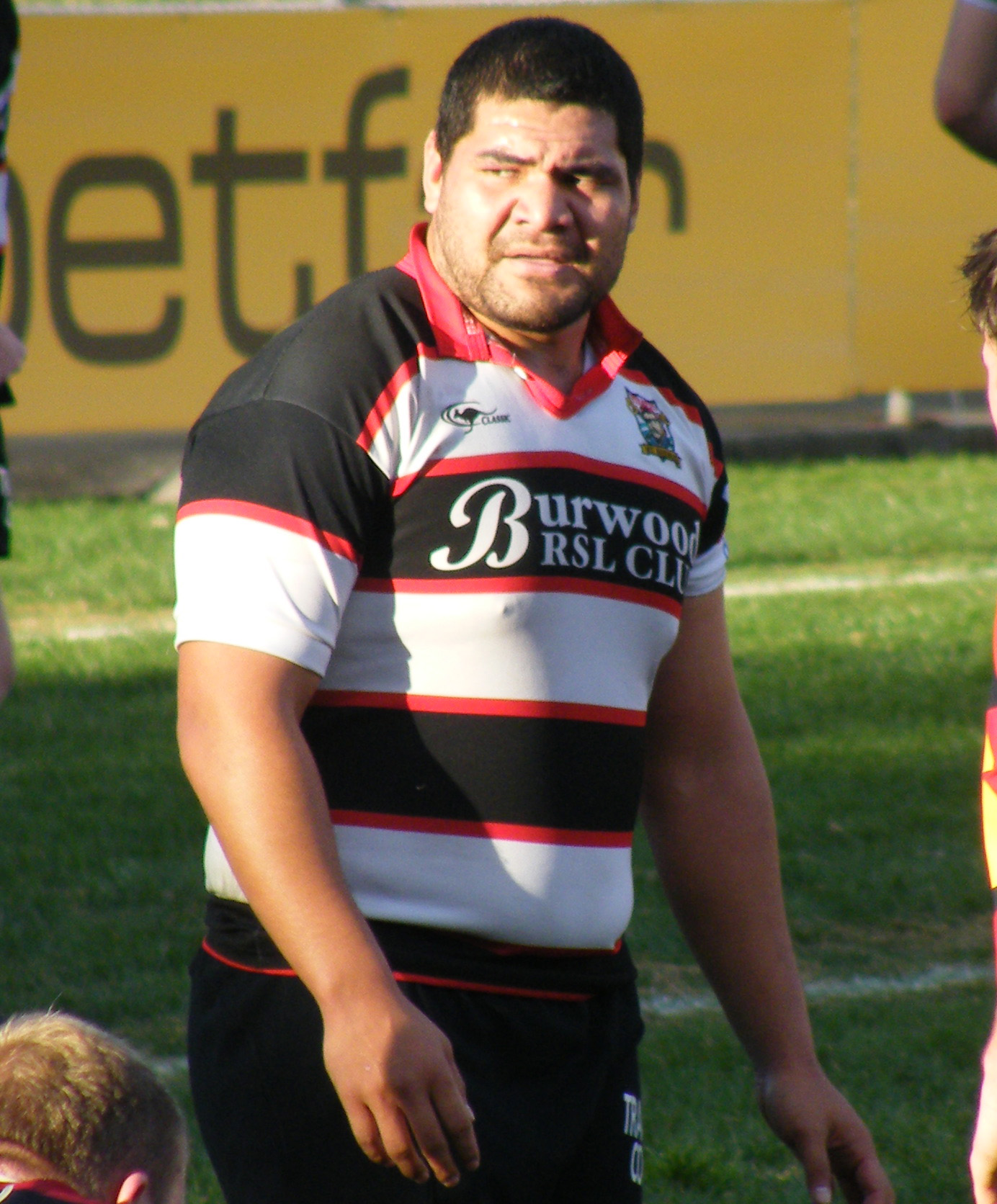
- Born: Rodney Blake; 29 April 1983 (age 43) Sa'aveki, Tonga
- Height: 6 ft 3 in (1.91 m)
- Weight: 132 kg (20 st 11 lb)
- School: Homebush Boys High

Rugby union career
- Position: prop
- Current team: Bowen Mudcrabs
Youth career
- West Harbour Juniors
Provincial / State sides
Years	Team	Apps	(Points)
2004–08	Sunnybank	25	(5)
2007	East Coast Aces	6	(10)
2008–10	Bayonne	52	(10)
Super Rugby
Years	Team	Apps	(Points)
2005–08	Queensland Reds	25	(6)
2011–12	Melbourne Rebels	20	(15)
International career
Years	Team	Apps	(Points)
2006	Australia	7	(5)

Rodney Blake (born 29 April 1983) is an Australian professional rugby union footballer. He played as a prop in Super Rugby for the Queensland Reds and Melbourne Rebels, and played for Bayonne in the Top 14 in France. He is sometimes referred to as Rodzilla. Blake made his debut for the Wallabies in 2006.

== Early life ==
Rodney Blake was born in Sa'aveki, Tonga. His father Paul is a former Otago flanker and moved his family to Sydney when Rodney was 13. The young Blake played rugby for the West Harbour RFC juniors and was educated at Homebush Boys High School. He was a member of the Australian Schools side, and he represented Australia under-21 world cup in Scotland.

== Career ==
He made his Queensland Reds Super Rugby debut against the Otago Highlanders. He was a regular in the Reds' line-up during the 2006 Super 14 season. He was named in John Connolly's Wallaby side, and made his test debut against England at Telstra Stadium, playing the full 80 minutes. In the closing minutes of the match Blake charged over to score the final try of the game which saw Australia win 34 to 3. He was injured in the subsequent victory over England, and thus missed the following match against Ireland. Blake missed the opening matches of the 2006 Tri Nations Series but played for the Wallabies in a Bledisloe Cup match against the All Blacks in Brisbane.

In October 2006, he was named the Reds "Player of the Year" and awarded the Pilecki Medal. In 2009, after failing to secure a Super 14 contract in Australia, Blake moved to France and spent two seasons in the French Top 14 competition.

In 2010 Blake returned to Australia, joining the Melbourne Rebels in preparation for the Rebels' 2011 Super Rugby season. In 2012, his Rebels teammates included props Nic Henderson, Laurie Weeks, the 20-year-old Paul Alo-Emile, and new signings Kurtley Beale and James O'Connor. Rebels coach Damien Hill praised Blake's agility, and decision-making abilities in both attack and defence. Hill said, "Rodney's biggest challenge, season in, season out, is to make sure he has the aerobic capacity to perform those skills for long periods of time rather than in small bits."

Blake left the Rebels after the 2012 season and moved to Airlie Beach in Queensland. He played representative rugby for the Mackay Stingers in the North Queensland Rugby Championships in 2014.
