= Dan Vickerman =

Australia international rugby union player (1979–2017)

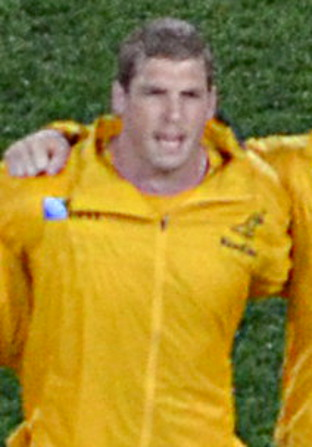
- Vickerman during the 2011 Rugby World Cup
- Born: Daniel Joseph Vickerman; 4 June 1979 Cape Town, Cape Province, South Africa
- Died: 18 February 2017 (aged 37) Sydney, New South Wales, Australia
- Height: 2.04 m (6 ft 8 1/2 in)
- Weight: 119 kg (18 st 10 lb; 262 lb)
- School: Diocesan College
- University: Hughes Hall, Cambridge

Rugby union career
- Position: Lock
Senior career
Years	Team	Apps	(Points)
2009–10	Northampton	12	(0)
Super Rugby
Years	Team	Apps	(Points)
2001–03	Brumbies	20	(30)
2004–08, 2011	Waratahs	58	(0)
- Correct as of 1 June 2012
International career
Years	Team	Apps	(Points)
2002–11	Australia	63	(0)
2002	Australia A		
2000	Australia U21		
Medal record
Men's rugby union
Representing Australia
Rugby World Cup
Silver medal – second place	2003 Australia	Squad
Bronze medal – third place	2011 New Zealand	Squad

Daniel Joseph Vickerman (4 June 1979 – 18 February 2017) was a professional rugby union player. The 204 cm, 119 kg lock played 63 Tests with the Wallabies, the national team of his adopted country of Australia. After seven seasons with the Wallabies, and having played Super Rugby for the New South Wales Waratahs and ACT Brumbies, Vickerman left his successful international rugby career in 2008. He attended the University of Cambridge, where he read a degree in Land Economy at Hughes Hall. While in England, he played rugby for Cambridge University and Northampton Saints. In 2011, he returned to Australia and played again for the Wallabies, including at the 2011 Rugby World Cup, before he retired from the game.

== Early life ==
Vickerman was born in South Africa and played his early rugby in South Africa. He attended Bishops College in Cape Town and played for their First XV. When he was 17 he spent a year in England playing for Cheltenham Colts (under 19) where he would play with, amongst others, Peter Buxton who himself went on to have a successful professional career, most notably with Premiership club Gloucester. Vickerman and Buxton took a year out together to visit and play rugby for the University of Queensland Rugby Club, Australia. This started Vickerman on the path to representing Australia, first at Under 21 level. After representing South Africa at Under-21 level in 1999, Vickerman arrived in Australia the following year and played for Australia at the 2000 SANZAR-UAR Under-21 tournament.

== Rugby career ==
In 2001, Vickerman was contracted by the Brumbies and made his debut that season in a Super 12 match against the Sharks in Durban. He played a total of seven Super 12 games that season. In 2002, he was selected to play for Australia A in Canada that year. He went on to make his test debut that year in Sydney in a match against France.

Vickerman became a regular for the Wallabies in 2003, either as a starter or off the bench. He signed with the Waratahs for the 2004 season. Vickerman was a replacement in all the domestic Wallaby tests in 2004, but became the starting lock on the end of year tour to the United Kingdom and France.

In 2006 he started in all but one match for the Waratahs who made it to the finals of the 2006 Super 14 season. He was subsequently named in John Connolly's Wallaby squad. Later that season he injured his shoulder and underwent reconstruction surgery in November 2006. Although missing most of the 2007 Super 14 season through injury recovery, Vickerman returned to the Test scene in a test match against Wales coming off the bench, and cemented his place back in the Wallaby starting line up for the Wallabies 2007 Rugby World Cup squad. Vickerman raised his 50th Test cap against Wales during the 2007 World Cup, but managed just three appearances during the 2008 international because of another shoulder injury he sustained in the 2008 Super 14 final.

In the autumn of 2008 Vickerman left Australia for England to study at Cambridge University, where he read Land Economy for three years. He played for Cambridge in the 2008 Varsity Match. The following year, he combined his studies with a renewed professional career at Northampton Saints. He signed a one-year deal in May 2009 to play with Northampton in the Guinness Premiership for the 2009–10 season, but arranged to delay his arrival with the team until after the 2009 Varsity Match in December, in which he captained Cambridge to a 31–27 victory over eternal rival Oxford. His first match for the Saints was against Sale Sharks on 7 March 2010.

Vickerman returned to Australia in 2011 to play again for the Waratahs and press his claims for national selection. He was chosen in the Wallabies team which won the 2011 Tri Nations Series and claimed third place at the 2011 Rugby World Cup. A persistent injury problem with stress fractures in the tibia of his right leg forced his retirement from the game in 2012. He worked for the Rugby Union Players' Association after his retirement.

== Death ==
Vickerman died on the night of 18 February 2017 at his Sydney home, at the age of 37. The cause of death was confirmed as suicide. He was survived by his wife and two young children.
