= Mark Chisholm =

Australian rugby union player

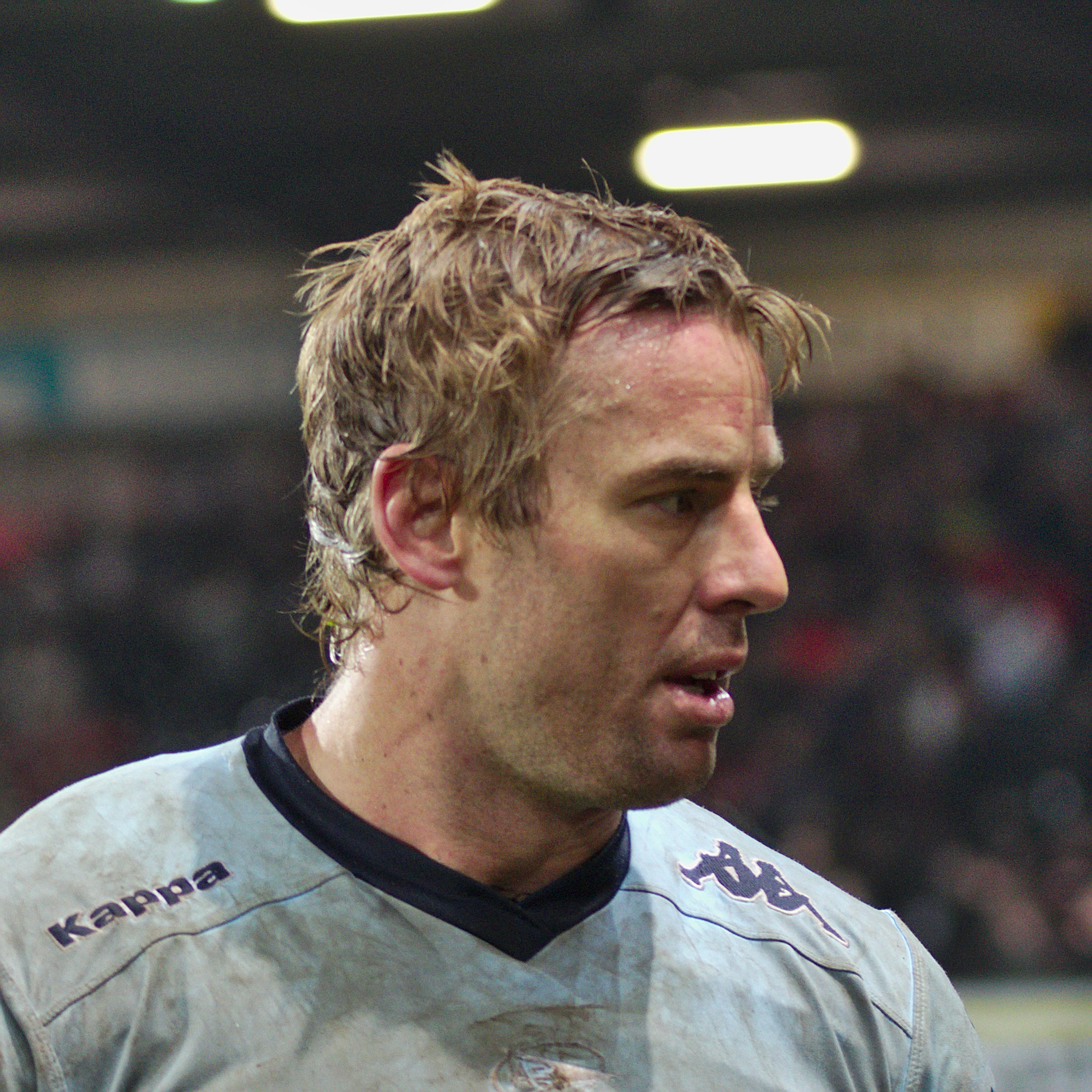
- Born: 18 September 1981 (age 45) Gladstone, Australia
- Height: 1.97 m (6 ft 5 1/2 in)
- Weight: 117 kg (18.4 st; 258 lb)
- School: St Joseph's College

Rugby union career
- Position(s): Lock, Flanker
Senior career
Years	Team	Apps	(Points)
2003–2011	Brumbies	102	(85)
2011–2015	Bayonne	89	(10)
2015–2017	Munster	18	(5)
- Correct as of 6 March 2016
International career
Years	Team	Apps	(Points)
2004–2011	Australia	58	(30)

Mark Chisholm (born 18 September 1981) is a retired Australian rugby union player. Chisholm usually played as a lock, but could also cover blindside flanker.

== Career ==
Chisholm represented Australia's under-19 side in 2000 as well as being named QRU Colt of the season for his club Wests Bulldogs. He also played for the under-21 side in 2001 and 2002. He spent the 2002 Super 12 season with the Queensland Reds as a product of the Energex Reds College. The following season he moved to the Brumbies and made his Super 12 debut for the side that season in a game against the Cats in Johannesburg as a replacement, he went on to play in six more matches that season.

Chisholm was a pillar of the CA Brumbies' starting XV, having held down a run-on lock position for six years. The athletic 115-kilo second rower managed just seven matches for the CA Brumbies in the 2009 Super 14 season before a broken wrist, suffered against the Cheetahs in Bloemfontein, prematurely ended the veteran lock's season. While the setback saw him overlooked for the Wallabies domestic Tests, Chisholm returned to the international fold during the 2009 Tri Nations Series, again establishing himself in the Australian starting XV. His role as an incumbent lock for the Wallabies also booked him a place on the Wallabies' Grand Slam northern hemisphere tour – the fifth Spring Tour of his career. His strong lineout winning ability, aggressive physicality, barnstorming running and frequent try-scoring has formed the cornerstone of his success throughout his career. The powerful tight forward was a consistent performer for the CA Brumbies since his boom debut season in the 2004 Super 12 season that featured six tries in a Super 12 championship-winning year. In addition to his Super 12 title, Chisholm was named the CA Brumbies' 'Best Forward' and runner-up to George Smith in the Brett Robinson Award in 2007, and is currently the club's second most-capped lock behind David Giffin (80 caps). It was announced in May 2011 that Chisholm had signed with French club Bayonne on a 2-year deal.

Chisholm has also been a key figure in Wallaby selections since making his Test debut – replacing Nathan Sharpe – on the 2004 Spring Tour and passed 50 Tests in 2010. The following season he made his debut for the Wallabies in a test against Scotland in Edinburgh and was subsequently named in the 22 against France the following week and went on to start at lock for Australia A against the French Barbarians in Paris. In 2005 he started at lock in six of the 12 tests he played in. He also scored tries in the tests against Samoa and Italy. He was named in the Wallabies 2007 Rugby World Cup squad. He is the 32nd Australian player to play in a half century of Tests, and just the fourth lock. He finished the 2010 Super 14 season just 12 matches short of a century of matches in that competition. He was ruled out of competing in the 2011 Rugby World Cup due to rupturing his anterior cruciate ligament in a Super Rugby match for the Brumbies in June 2011.

At 6 ft 6 inches and weighing 246 lb, he is one of the largest players in current Australian rugby. He was also described by body building flanker David Pocock as the wallaby with the largest biceps.

On 5 August 2015, it was announced that Chisholm had joined Irish Pro12 side Munster on a two-year contract. Chisholm made his Munster debut on 13 September 2015, starting against Ospreys in the 2015–16 Pro12. He made his European Rugby Champions Cup debut on 14 November 2015, starting the opening 2015–16 pool game against Treviso. On 27 February 2017, it was announced that, following an extended break from rugby due to concussion, Chisholm had returned to full training with Munster. On 31 March 2017, Chisholm made his first appearance since March 2016 when he was a replacement for Munster A in their 2016–17 British and Irish Cup semi-final win against Ealing Trailfinders. On 19 May 2017, it was announced that Chisholm would be retiring from rugby union upon the conclusion of the 2016–17 season.

== Personal life ==
Mark was born to parents James and Laurel Chisholm on 18 September 1981 in Gladstone, Queensland. In 1998 he graduated from St Joseph's College, Gregory Terrace in Brisbane.

In December 2004, he married his childhood sweetheart Lauren Campbell with the blessing of her father, former Wallaby second row Bill Campbell, at All Hallows in Brisbane. They have 5 children together; Zachary, Xander, Allegra, Tobias and Olivier.
