= Al Baxter =

Australian former rugby union footballer

Alastair Baxter
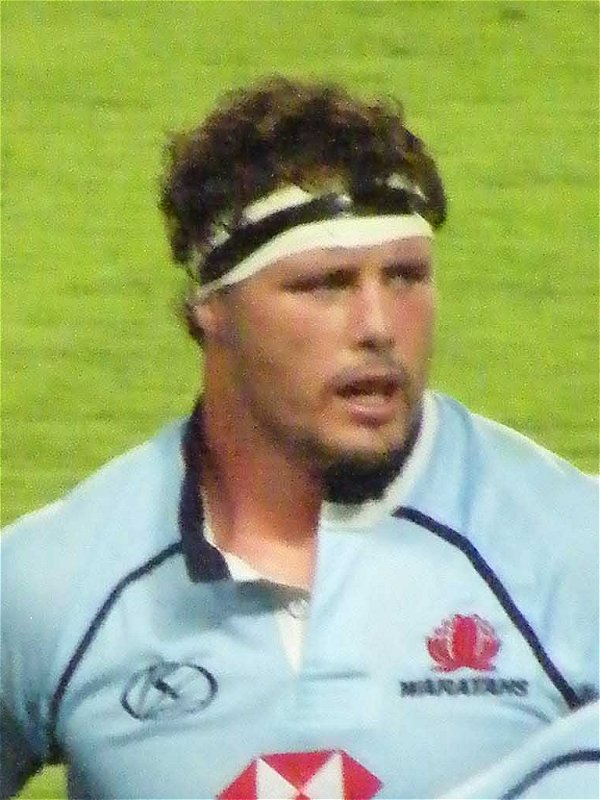
- Alastair Baxter playing for the NSW Waratahs
- Born: Alastair Baxter; 21 January 1977 (age 49) Sydney, Australia
- Height: 190 cm (6 ft 3 in)
- Weight: 116 kg (18 st 4 lb)
- School: Shore
- University: Sydney University
- Notable relative(s): Nick Baxter, brother

Rugby union career
- Position: Prop
- Current team: Northern Suburbs
Amateur team(s)
Years	Team	Apps	(Points)
1998–2011	Northern Suburbs	98	
- Correct as of 4 July 2014
Super Rugby
Years	Team	Apps	(Points)
2000–2011	NSW Waratahs	121	(5)
- Correct as of 4 July 2014
International career
Years	Team	Apps	(Points)
2003–2009	Australia	69	(5)
- Correct as of 4 July 2014

Alastair Baxter (born 21 January 1977) is an Australian former rugby union footballer. He played his entire professional career with the Waratahs in Super Rugby. He played in the 2003 and 2007 Rugby World Cups, including the loss to England in the 2003 final.

== Career ==
Baxter made his Wallaby debut against the All Blacks during the 2003 Bledisloe Cup. He earnt his 50th test cap against Canada during the 2007 Rugby World Cup, scoring his one and only test try. He has become only the second Australian prop to reach the milestone along with former NSW Waratahs coach Ewen McKenzie. Baxter scored his first Super Rugby try on his 100th appearance for the NSW Waratahs. He is the 3rd most capped Wallaby prop behind Benn Robinson and Ben Alexander. Baxter retired from the game in 2011 to pursue a career in architecture. In May 2018 he was appointed as vice-president of NSW Rugby Union.
