= Stephen Hoiles =

Australian rugby union player (born 1981)

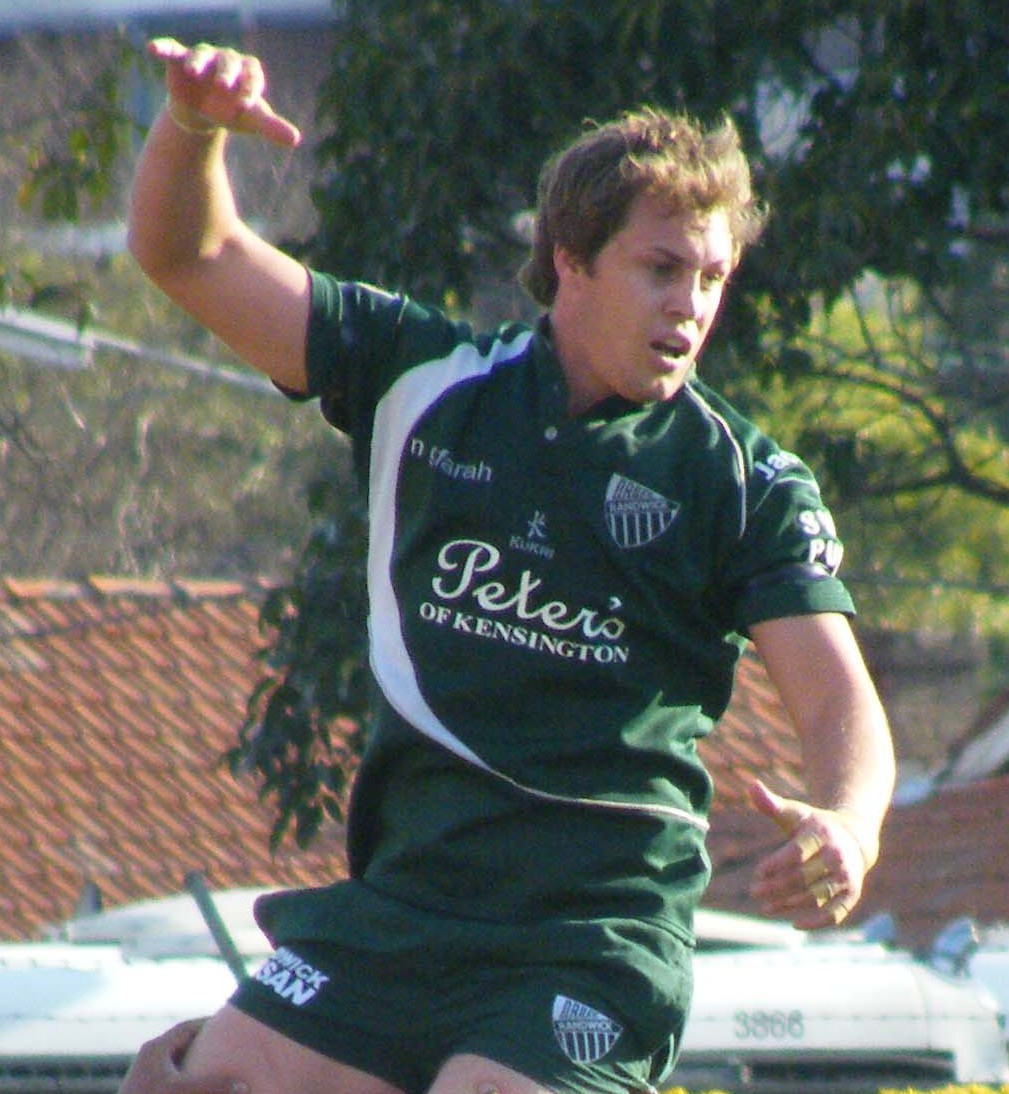
- Full name: Stephen Alan Hoiles
- Born: 13 October 1981 (age 45) Sydney, New South Wales, Australia
- Height: 1.90 m (6 ft 3 in)
- Weight: 102 kg (16 st 1 lb; 225 lb)
- School: Waverley College
- Occupation(s): Commentator; Head coach

Rugby union career
- Position: Loose forward
Youth career
- Coogee Seahorses
Amateur team(s)
Years	Team	Apps	(Points)
2002–2016	Randwick	14	(15)
Senior career
Years	Team	Apps	(Points)
2014	NSW Country Eagles	4	(5)
- Correct as of 18 April 2017
Super Rugby
Years	Team	Apps	(Points)
2004–2006	Waratahs	26	(10)
2007–2011	Brumbies	48	(10)
2014–2015	Waratahs	32	(32)
International career
Years	Team	Apps	(Points)
2004–08	Australia	16	(15)
- Correct as of 18 April 2017
Coaching career
- Years: Team
- 2021–22: LA Giltinis
- 2023–24: Randwick
- 2025–pres.: RFC Los Angeles

Stephen Hoiles (born 13 October 1981) is an Australian rugby union coach and former player. Currently, he is the head coach of Major League Rugby team RFC Los Angeles. He was previously head coach at Randwick, and the LA Giltinis, winning a Major League Rugby championship in the team's inaugural season.

He played Super Rugby for the New South Wales Waratahs and the ACT Brumbies. He also represented the Australia national rugby union team.

== Early life ==
Hoiles joined the Coogee Seahorses Juniors at age six, played his rugby on Saturdays and league on Sundays with the Coogee Wombats. He attended Sydney’s Waverley College and in 1999 played in the 1st XV.

== Playing career ==
After graduation from high school Hoiles, joined the Randwick club and in 2001 he was picked to play for the Australian Men’s 7s team. In 2004, he gained a full-time contract with the NSW Waratahs.

Hoiles represented the Wallabies for the first time in 2004 at the age of 22 in the Test match against Scotland. In 2004, Hoiles was part of the Randwick team that won the Sydney club championship.

He played over 100 first grade games for his club side Randwick as well as over 100 Super Rugby games for the NSW Waratahs and the ACT Brumbies where he was captained for 3 seasons. His professional playing career was put on hold for three and a half seasons with a long term achilles injury. During this time, Hoiles travelled to Sweden to have his foot operated on. This surgery allowed Hoiles to return to professional rugby where he joined the NSW Waratahs and was a starting member of the Super Rugby Championship winning team in 2014.

== Post-playing career ==
Having retired from playing in 2015, Hoiles began his role as a rugby commentator and TV presenter with Fox Sports. In 2018, Hoiles began coaching professionally where he was the assistant coach of the Australia national rugby sevens team.

In October 2022, Hoiles announced he would no longer continue as head coach of LA Giltinis and would be returning to Australia to coach Randwick for the 2023 season.

In May 2024, Hoiles announced he would be standing down as head coach of Randwick.
