= Stirling Mortlock =

Australia international rugby union player

Stirling Mortlock AM
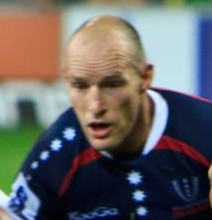
- Born: Stirling Austin Mortlock; 20 May 1977 (age 49) Sydney, New South Wales, Australia
- Height: 191 cm (6 ft 3 in)
- Weight: 105 kg (16 st 7 lb)
- School: The King's School, Parramatta

Rugby union career
- Position(s): Centre, Wing, Fullback
Super Rugby
Years	Team	Apps	(Points)
1998–2010	Brumbies	117	(1,019)
2011–2012	Rebels	23	(17)
- Correct as of 23 July 2012
International career
Years	Team	Apps	(Points)
2000–2009	Australia	80	(489)
- Correct as of 2013

Stirling Austin Mortlock AM (born 20 May 1977) is an Australian former professional rugby union player. He has scored more than 1,000 points in Super Rugby, and nearly 500 test points for the Wallabies. Mortlock is a former Wallaby, Melbourne Rebels and Brumbies captain.

== Early life ==
Born in Sydney, Mortlock began playing rugby with Lindfield Juniors. Mortlock was educated at The King's School in Parramatta Sydney. He represented Gordon Juniors at Colt level and still represents Gordon at club level today. He represented Australia at Under 19 and Under 21 level before pursuing a professional career with the Brumbies.

== Professional career ==
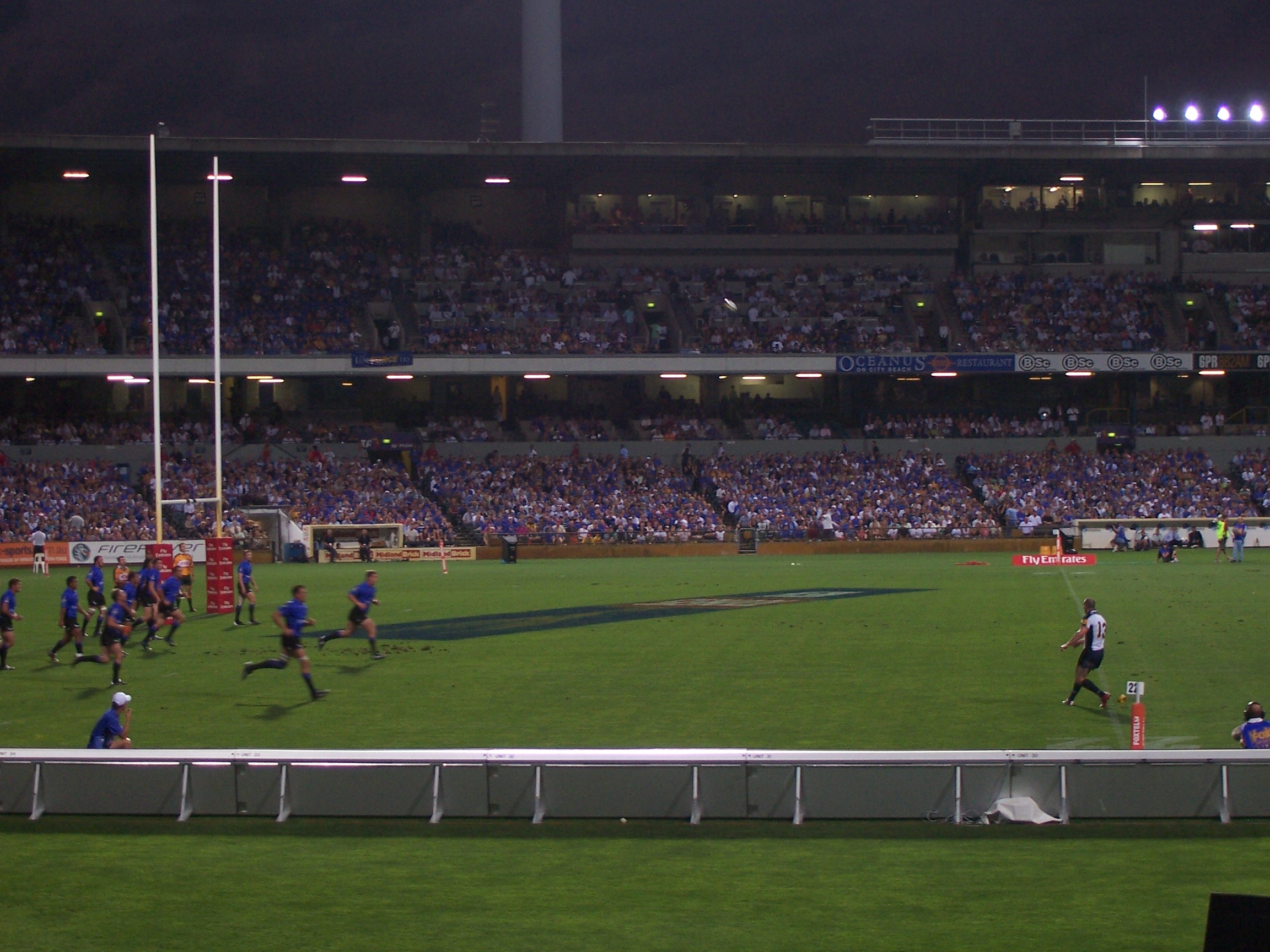
Mortlock kicks a successful conversion for the Brumbies

=== Brumbies career ===
In 1998, Mortlock joined the ACT Brumbies. He was part of the Brumbies Super Rugby championships team in 2001. In 2004 he succeeded George Gregan as ACT Brumbies Captain and played every game that season except the final due to injury and thus was unable to lead the team to claim the Super 12 title that year.

=== Wallabies career ===
Then Wallaby coach Rod Macqueen plucked Mortlock out of club rugby at the young age of 20 to tour Argentina with the Wallabies in 1997.

In 2000, he made his Test debut against Argentina.

2000 was a landmark year for Mortlock – he became the fastest Australian to reach 50 and 100 Test points, he scored the most points and highest number of penalties [16] by any Australian in his first five Tests and created history by becoming the first Australian to score 20 points or more in four consecutive Tests. With the Wallaby team, Mortlock was instrumental in the famous Bledisloe and Tri-Nation Series' Victories of 2000. He scored a sideline penalty goal in 2000 against South Africa in Durban to win Australia's first Tri Nations crown.

Mortlock won man-of-the-match and had an 80-metre intercept try at then-Telstra Stadium to help knock the All Blacks out of the 2003 Rugby World Cup in the semi-final.

In 2006, Mortlock became the 73rd player to captain the Wallabies. In 2007, Mortlock was made co-captain with Phil Waugh.

In February 2008, Mortlock announced that he hoped to continue playing with the Wallabies until at least the end of 2010. Australian Rugby Union CEO John O'Neill endorsed this decision saying that Mortlock is a "real captain courageous" and an "inspirational leader".

He missed Wallabies' selection in October 2010. A press release from the Rebels said Mortlock was recuperating after surgery, and hoped to be "training in full by December."

=== Melbourne Rebels ===
The Melbourne Rebels signed Mortlock in March 2010, to a three-year deal for an undisclosed amount. Mortlock was declared the Rebels inaugural Captain on 2 February 2011, with former Wales international Gareth Delve as Vice-Captain.

In June 2012, Mortlock announced he would retire as a player at the end of the 2012 Super Rugby season, However, in 2013 he continued with the Rebels in a supporting role.

== Records and awards ==
Mortlock was named Super Rugby player of the year in 2002. In 2008, Mortlock's ability to score tries and kick goals positioned him third on the all-time list of Australian Test point scorers (with 473 points). In May 2009, in the Super 14 match between the Auckland Blues and the ACT Brumbies Mortlock became the highest points scorer in Super Rugby history, surpassing New Zealand's Andrew Mehrtens. He finished with on 1019 Super Rugby points for the Brumbies. He is the sixth player for the Brumbies to achieve 100 caps.

Mortlock was made a Member of the Order of Australia in the 2012 Australia Day Honours List.

Preceded by Phil Waugh	Australian national rugby union captain 2006–07	Succeeded by George Smith
