= John Connolly (rugby union coach) =

Australian rugby union player & coach

John Connolly AM
- Born: 26 June 1951 (age 75) Brisbane, Queensland, Australia

Rugby union career
- Position: Hooker
Coaching career
- Years: Team
- Australia

John "Knuckles" Connolly AM (born 26 June 1951) is an Australian rugby union coach and the former head coach of the Australia national rugby union team. Connolly has in the past worked with the Queensland Reds, Stade Français, Swansea RFC as well as Bath Rugby.

As a rugby player, Connolly played hooker for the Brothers club in Brisbane. From 1980 through to 1982, Connolly acted as a player and a coach for a rugby team in Darwin. His first major coaching position was with the Brothers club in Brisbane in 1983, acting as the reserve grade coach for three years, taking the team to two premierships. Subsequent roles came to him as he was appointed as the Under 19s and Under 21s Queensland rugby union coach. In 1989, Connolly took up a coaching position within the Queensland Rugby team. In 1991, Connolly served as an Australian selector. During his time with Queensland, the side won the Super Six in 1992 and the Super 10 Championship in 1994 and 1995.

With the inception of the Super 12 competition in Australia in 1996, Connolly continued his position at the Queensland Reds. The Reds won the minor premiership that year, and Connolly went on to win the Super 12 Coach of the Year award in both 1998 and 1999, the Reds also winning the minor premiership in 1999 as well. He went over to France the following season, where he took up a position at the Stade Français rugby club. The club won the premiership during the 1999–2000 season and were Heineken Cup finalists that same year as well as the next. He then coached at Swansea RFC in Wales.

He then took up a position at the Bath Rugby club in England, where Michael Foley had been signed as their forwards coach, Foley had previously played as hooker under Connolly at the Queensland Reds. Connolly was awarded the Zurich Premiership Director of the Year award as well and Bath won the minor premiership in the 2003–04 season. Bath went on to meet the London Wasps in the final, with the Wasps winning in the end. The following year they were finalists in the Powergen Cup.

In early February 2006 Connolly was appointed as the new head coach of the Australian team. In his first Test in charge, Australia defeated England in the first of two games in Australia. Australia then finished second in the 2006 Tri Nations Series.

Following the defeat to England in the quarter-finals of the 2007 Rugby World Cup, Connolly's term as coach of the Wallabies had expired.

He got his nickname, 'Knuckles', as a nightclub bouncer in Darwin years ago.

Connolly suffered serious spinal fractures along with a broken arm and dislocated shoulder after a two-metre fall at his father Jack's Brisbane home In August 2021. He broke his neck and has no feeling below his chest and is now in a wheelchair.

In December 2024, it was announced that Connolly would be inducted into the Queensland Rugby Union Hall of Fame on 14 February 2025 for his decorated career as a Queensland Reds and Wallabies coach, despite previously successfully suing the QRU for damages in 2017 after he was sacked as a coaching consultant.

On Australia Day 2026, Connolly was awarded the Member of the Order of Australia for his "significant service to rugby union as coach and mentor."

== Politics ==
In March 2011, Connolly was the Liberal National Party candidate at the 2012 state election in the constituency of Nicklin, facing the long-serving independent MP Peter Wellington. Connolly was not elected, despite a swing in his favour.

Connolly served as the Division 4 councillor on Sunshine Coast Regional Council from 2016 until 2020.

In August 2020, Connolly announced he would be running as an Iindependent candidate in the electorate of Maroochydore at the 2020 Queensland state election.

Connolly also ran unsuccessfully for the Sunshine Coast council in the Queensland Local Government elections in March 2024.

Preceded by Eddie Jones	Australian national rugby union coach 2006–2007	Succeeded by Robbie Deans
