= 2008 Super 14 season =

Men's rugby union club competition

2008 Super 14
- Countries: Australia; South Africa; New Zealand
- Tournament format(s): Round-robin and knockout
- Champions: (New Zealand) Crusaders (7th title)
- Matches played: 91
- Tries scored: 519 (5.7 per match)
- Top point scorer(s): (New Zealand) Stephen Donald (150) (Chiefs)
- Top try scorer(s): (New Zealand) Lelia Masaga (8) (Chiefs)

The 2008 Super 14 season started in February 2008 with pre-season matches held from mid-January. It finished on 31 May, when the Crusaders won their seventh Super Rugby title with a 20–12 victory over the Waratahs in front of the Crusaders' home fans at AMI Stadium. The 2008 season was the third of the expansion, which led to the name change to the Super 14. The schedule, which covered 3½ months, featured a total of 94 matches, with each team playing one full round robin against the 13 other teams, two semi-finals and a final. Every team received one bye over the 14 rounds.

== Introduction of Experimental law variations ==
The 2008 competition is currently the highest level competition to trial any of the International Rugby Board's (IRB) Experimental law variations (ELVs). The laws had been trialled in various competitions in both the Northern and Southern Hemisphere. The highest level competition the laws had previously been introduced to was the 2007 Australian Rugby Championship. The introduction of the laws for the 2008 season was approved by the competition's governing body, SANZAR, at a meeting on 4 December 2007.

SANZAR decided not to adopt all the ELVs, and decided to adopt the following:

- The corner posts are moved so that they are outside the junction of the touchline and goal-line. A player will also not be in touch if they are touching the corner post unless they are also touching either the touchline, or ground over the touchline.
- A ball can be thrown backwards on a quick throw-in rather than having to be thrown straight.
- The offside line will now occur immediately once a tackle is made.
- At the breakdown the Scrum-half (half-back) cannot be touched unless they are touching the ball.
- During a scrum, with the exception of forwards in the scrum, and each team's scrum-half, the offside line will now be 5 metres behind the hindmost foot of a scrum.
- With the exception of offside, not entering the breakdown through the gate, and foul-play, the punishment will be a free kick.

== Table ==
2008 Super 14 table
Pos	Team	Pld	W	D	L	PF	PA	PD	B	Pts	Qualification
1	(New Zealand) Crusaders	13	11	0	2	369	176	+193	8	52	Advance to playoffs
2	(Australia) Waratahs	13	9	1	3	255	186	+69	5	43	Advance to playoffs
3	(South Africa) Sharks	13	9	1	3	271	209	+62	4	42	Advance to playoffs
4	(New Zealand) Hurricanes	13	8	1	4	310	204	+106	7	41	Advance to playoffs
5	(South Africa) Stormers	13	8	1	4	269	211	+58	7	41	
6	(New Zealand) Blues	13	8	0	5	354	267	+87	8	40	
7	(New Zealand) Chiefs	13	7	0	6	348	349	−1	6	34	
8	(Australia) Force	13	7	0	6	247	278	−31	4	32	
9	(Australia) Brumbies	13	6	0	7	277	317	−40	6	30	
10	(South Africa) Bulls	13	6	0	7	324	347	−23	4	28	
11	(New Zealand) Highlanders	13	3	0	10	257	338	−81	7	19	
12	(Australia) Reds	13	3	1	9	258	323	−65	4	18	
13	(South Africa) Cheetahs	13	1	0	12	255	428	−173	9	13	
14	(South Africa) Lions	13	2	1	10	206	367	−161	2	12	

Updated to match(es) played on 2008-05-17. Source:

== Results ==
=== Round 1 ===
15 February 2008	Crusaders (New Zealand)	34–3	(Australia) Brumbies	AMI Stadium, Christchurch
19:35	Tries: Mose Tuiali'i (2), Brad Thorn, Dan Carter; Con: Dan Carter (4); Pen: Dan Carter (2)		Pen: Julian Huxley	Attendance: 16,254; Referee: Mark Lawrence (South Africa)

15 February 2008	Reds (Australia)	22–16	(New Zealand) Highlanders	Suncorp Stadium, Brisbane
19:05	Tries: John Roe (2), Clinton Schifcofske; Con: Clinton Schifcofske (2); Pen: Clinton Schifcofske		Tries: Adam Thomson; Con: Mike Delany; Pen: Paul Williams (2), Daniel Bowden	Attendance: 19,183; Referee: Marius Jonker (South Africa)

15 February 2008	Sharks (South Africa)	17–10	(Australia) Western Force	ABSA Stadium, Durban
19:10	Tries: Jacques Botes, Stefan Terblanche; Con: Ruan Pienaar (2); Pen: François Steyn		Tries: Luke Holmes; Con: Matt Giteau; Pen: Cameron Shepherd	Attendance: 30,043; Referee: Kelvin Deaker (New Zealand)

16 February 2008	Blues (New Zealand)	32–14	(New Zealand) Chiefs	Eden Park, Auckland
19:35	Tries: Danny Lee, Troy Flavell, Joe Rokocoko, Ben Atiga; Con: Nick Evans (3); Pen: Nick Evans (2)		Tries: Mils Muliaina; Pen: Stephen Donald (3)	Attendance: 23,480; Referee: Lyndon Bray (New Zealand)

16 February 2008	Waratahs (Australia)	20–3	(New Zealand) Hurricanes	Sydney Football Stadium, Sydney
19:40	Tries: Lachlan Turner (2), Rocky Elsom; Con: Kurtley Beale; Pen: Kurtley Beale		Pen: Jimmy Gopperth	Attendance: 27,011; Referee: Craig Joubert (South Africa)

16 February 2008	Stormers (South Africa)	9–16	(South Africa) Bulls	Newlands, Cape Town
17:00	Pen: Peter Grant (3)		Tries: Bryan Habana; Con: Derick Hougaard; Pen: Derick Hougaard (3)	Attendance: 47,896; Referee: Willie Roos (South Africa)

16 February 2008	Cheetahs (South Africa)	22–23	(South Africa) Lions	Vodacom Park, Bloemfontein
19:05	Tries: Eddie Fredericks, Duane Vermeulen, Barend Pieterse; Con: Jacques-Louis Potgieter (2); Pen: Jacques-Louis Potgieter		Tries: Franco van der Merwe, Doppies la Grange; Con: Louis Strydom, Earl Rose; Pen: Louis Strydom (2), Earl Rose	Attendance: 17,231; Referee: Jonathan Kaplan (South Africa)

=== Round 2 ===
22 February 2008	Hurricanes (New Zealand)	23–18	(Australia) Reds	Westpac Stadium, Wellington
19:35	Tries: Tane Tuʻipulotu, Ma'a Nonu; Con: Jimmy Gopperth (2); Pen: Jimmy Gopperth (3)		Tries: Van Humphries, John Roe; Con: Clinton Schifcofske; Pen: Clinton Schifcofske (2)	Attendance: 15,682; Referee: Mark Lawrence (South Africa)

22 February 2008	Cheetahs (South Africa)	15–16	(Australia) Western Force	Vodacom Park, Bloemfontein
18:00	Tries: Hennie Daniller, Heinrich Brüssow; Con: Jacques-Louis Potgieter; Pen: Conrad Barnard		Tries: Matt Giteau; Con: Matt Giteau; Pen: Matt Giteau (3)	Attendance: 14,632; Referee: Chris Pollock (New Zealand)

22 February 2008	Bulls (South Africa)	19–54	(New Zealand) Crusaders	Loftus Versfeld, Pretoria
20:05	Tries: JP Nel; Con: Morné Steyn; Pen: Derick Hougaard (4)		Tries: Stephen Brett, Andy Ellis, Richie McCaw, Kade Poki, Nasi Manu, Dan Carter, Leon MacDonald; Con: Dan Carter (5); Pen: Dan Carter (3)	Attendance: 39,341; Referee: Matt Goddard (Australia)

23 February 2008	Chiefs (New Zealand)	20–17	(Australia) Waratahs	Waikato Stadium, Hamilton
19:35	Tries: Liam Messam, Sitiveni Sivivatu, Richard Kahui; Con: Stephen Donald; Pen: Stephen Donald		Tries: Ben Jacobs, Sam Harris, Lote Tuqiri; Con: Kurtley Beale; Pen:	Attendance: 10,273; Referee: Marius Jonker (South Africa)

23 February 2008	Brumbies (Australia)	22–20	(New Zealand) Highlanders	Canberra Stadium, Canberra
19:40	Tries: Anthony Fainga'a, Stephen Hoiles, Penalty try Con: Julian Huxley (2); Pen: Julian Huxley		Tries: Fetuʻu Vainikolo, Chris King; Con: James Wilson (2); Pen: James Wilson (2)	Attendance: 14,284; Referee: Craig Joubert (South Africa)

23 February 2008	Sharks (South Africa)	12–10	(South Africa) Stormers	ABSA Stadium, Durban
17:00	Pen: Rory Kockett (3), Ruan Pienaar		Tries: Ricky Januarie; Con: Peter Grant; Pen: Peter Grant	Attendance: 29,289; Referee: Kelvin Deaker (New Zealand)

23 February 2008	Lions (South Africa)	10–55	(New Zealand) Blues	Ellis Park, Johannesburg
19:05	Tries: Jaco van Schalkwyk; Con: Chris Jonck; Pen: Louis Strydon		Tries: Kurtis Haiu (2), Nick Evans, Jerome Kaino, Isa Nacewa, Nick Williams, Rudi Wulf; Con: Nick Evans (7); Pen: Nick Evans (2)	Attendance: 11,107; Referee: Stuart Dickinson (Australia)

=== Round 3 ===
29 February 2008	Hurricanes (New Zealand)	39–19	(New Zealand) Chiefs	Westpac Stadium, Wellington
19:35	Tries: Ma'a Nonu, Alby Mathewson, Shannon Paku, Rodney So'oialo, Chris Masoe, Jimmy Gopperth; Con: Jimmy Gopperth (3); Drop: Tane Tuʻipulotu		Tries: Liam Messam, Stephen Donald, Tanerau Latimer; Con: Stephen Donald (2)	Attendance: 16,913; Referee: Bryce Lawrence (New Zealand)

29 February 2008	Lions (South Africa)	16–18	(Australia) Western Force	Ellis Park, Johannesburg
18:30	Tries: Jaco van Schalkwyk; Con: Louis Strydom; Pen: Louis Strydom (3)		Tries: Cameron Shepherd, Tamaiti Horua; Con: Matt Giteau; Pen: Matt Giteau, Cameron Shepherd	Attendance: 6,051; Referee: Kelvin Deaker (New Zealand)

29 February 2008	Stormers (South Africa)	0–22	(New Zealand) Crusaders	Newlands, Cape Town
20:35			Tries: Andy Ellis, Sean Maitland; Pen: Dan Carter (4)	Attendance: 43,724; Referee: Matt Goddard (Australia)

1 March 2008	Highlanders (New Zealand)	12–15	(Australia) Waratahs	Carisbrook, Dunedin
19:25	Tries: Fetuʻu Vainikolo, Adam Thomson; Con: James Wilson; Pen:		Tries: Ben Jacobs, Wycliff Palu; Con: Kurtley Beale; Pen: Kurtley Beale	Attendance: 10,203; Referee: JC Fortuin (South Africa)

1 March 2008	Brumbies (Australia)	43–11	(Australia) Reds	Canberra Stadium, Canberra
19:40	Tries: Mark Chisholm (2), Mark Gerrard, Ben Alexander, Peter Playford, Stephen Hoiles; Con: Mark Gerrard (5); Pen: Mark Gerrard		Tries: John Roe, Pen: Clinton Schifcofske (2)	Attendance: 15,244; Referee: Lyndon Bray (New Zealand)

1 March 2008	Cheetahs (South Africa)	26–50	(New Zealand) Blues	Vodacom Park, Bloemfontein
17:00	Tries: Gavin Passens, JW Jonker, Heinrich Brüssow, Kabamba Floors; Con: Conrad Barnard (2), Meyer Bosman		Tries: Joe Rokocoko (3), Isaia Toeava (2), Rudi Wulf, Anthony Tuitavake; Con: Nick Evans (6); Pen: Nick Evans	Attendance: 22,984; Referee: Brett Bowden (Australia)

1 March 2008	Bulls (South Africa)	15–29	(South Africa) Sharks	Loftus Versfeld, Pretoria
19:05	Pen: Morné Steyn (4); Drop: Morné Steyn	Report	Tries: Odwa Ndungane, Frédéric Michalak, Keegan Daniel, Jacques Botes; Con: Rory Kockott (3); Pen: Rory Kockott	Attendance: 44,978; Referee: Mark Lawrence (South Africa)

=== Round 4 ===
7 March 2008	Highlanders (New Zealand)	6–10	(New Zealand) Hurricanes	Carisbrook, Dunedin
19:35	Pen: James Wilson (2)		Tries: Jerry Collins; Con: Jimmy Gopperth (1); Pen: Jimmy Gopperth (1)	Attendance: 8,603; Referee: Bryce Lawrence (New Zealand)

7 March 2008	Waratahs (Australia)	24–17	(Australia) Brumbies	Sydney Football Stadium, Sydney
19:40	Tries: Tom Carter, Dean Mumm, Lote Tuqiri; Con: Kurtley Beale (3); Pen: Kurtley Beale		Tries: Peter Playford, Julian Salvi; Con: Mark Gerrard (2); Pen: Mark Gerrard	Attendance: 32,371; Referee: James Leckie (Australia)

7 March 2008	Bulls (South Africa)	31–17	(South Africa) Lions	Loftus Versfeld, Pretoria
19:05	Tries: Akona Ndungane (2); Pen: Derick Hougaard (6); Drop: Derick Hougaard		Tries: Dusty Noble, Jano Vermaak, Rayno Benjamin; Con: Jano Vermaak	Attendance: 27,461; Referee: JC Fortuin (South Africa)

8 March 2008	Chiefs (New Zealand)	22–20	(South Africa) Cheetahs	Waikato Stadium, Hamilton
19:35	Tries: Brendon Leonard, Sitiveni Sivivatu, Callum Bruce; Con: Stephen Donald (2); Pen: Stephen Donald		Tries: Eddie Fredericks, Jongi Nokwe; Con: Conrad Barnard (2); Pen: Conrad Barnard (2)	Attendance: 10,686; Referee: Paul Marks (Australia)

8 March 2008	Reds (Australia)	16–34	(South Africa) Stormers	Suncorp Stadium, Brisbane
19:05	Tries: Chris Latham, Leroy Houston; Drop: Berrick Barnes (2)		Tries: Peter Grant, Luke Watson, Tonderai Chavhanga, Bolla Conradie; Con: Peter Grant (4); Pen: Peter Grant (2)	Attendance: 17,830; Referee: Chris Pollock (New Zealand)

8 March 2008	Sharks (South Africa)	22–17	(New Zealand) Blues	ABSA Stadium, Durban
19:10	Tries: Keegan Daniel (2), Johann Muller; Con: Rory Kockott (2); Pen: Rory Kockott		Tries: Nick Evans, Taniela Moa; Con: Nick Evans (2); Pen: Nick Evans	Attendance: 34,073; Referee: Brett Bowden (Australia)

9 March 2008	Western Force (Australia)	24–29	(New Zealand) Crusaders	Subiaco Oval, Perth
17:00	Tries: David Pocock, Ryan Cross, Richard Brown, Lachlan MacKay; Con: Matt Giteau (2)		Tries: Dan Carter (3), Greg Sommerville, Ali Williams, Andy Ellis, Casey Laulala; Con: Dan Carter (7)	Attendance: 27,011; Referee: Willie Roos (South Africa)

=== Round 5 ===
14 March 2008	Chiefs (New Zealand)	26–35	(South Africa) Stormers	Waikato Stadium, Hamilton
19:35	Tries: Richard Kahui, Lelia Masaga; Con: Stephen Donald (2); Pen: Stephen Donald (4)		Tries: Peter Grant, Tonderai Chavhanga (3), Conrad Jantjes, Penalty try Con: Peter Grant (3); Pen: Peter Grant (3)	Attendance: 10,002; Referee: Matt Goddard (Australia)

14 March 2008	Brumbies (Australia)	15–33	(New Zealand) Hurricanes	Canberra Stadium, Canberra
19:40	Tries: Julian Salvi, Tyrone Smith; Con: Mark Gerrard; Pen: Mark Gerrard		Tries: Chris Masoe (2), Shannon Paku, Hosea Gear, Andrew Hore; Con: Jimmy Gopperth (3), Willie Ripia	Attendance: 14,308; Referee: Willie Roos (South Africa)

15 March 2008	Blues (New Zealand)	17–27	(Australia) Western Force	North Harbour Stadium, Albany
17:30	Tries: Tony Woodcock, Anthony Tuitavake; Con: Nick Evans, Ben Atiga; Pen: Ben Atiga		Tries: Cameron Shepherd, Richard Brown, Tamaiti Horua; Con: Matt Giteau (3); Pen: Matt Giteau (2)	Attendance: 13,213; Referee: Craig Joubert (South Africa)

15 March 2008	Crusaders (New Zealand)	55–7	(South Africa) Cheetahs	AMI Stadium, Christchurch
19:35	Tries: Scott Hamilton (3), Casey Laulala (2), Sean Maitland, Dan Carter, Leon MacDonald, Ti'i Paulo, Caleb Ralph; Con: Dan Carter (5); Pen:		Tries: Jongi Nokwe; Con: Conrad Barnard	Attendance: 15,070; Referee: Paul Marks (Australia)

15 March 2008	Reds (Australia)	40–8	(South Africa) Bulls	Suncorp Stadium, Brisbane
19:05	Tries: Chris Latham, Peter Hynes, Clinton Schifcofske, Morgan Turinui, John Roe; Con: Clinton Schifcofske (3); Pen: Clinton Schifcofske (3)		Tries: Fourie du Preez; Pen: Derick Hougaard	Attendance: 14,411; Referee: Lyndon Bray (New Zealand)

15 March 2008	Lions (South Africa)	8–16	(South Africa) Sharks	Ellis Park, Johannesburg
17:00	Tries: Franco Van der Merwe; Pen: Jaco van Schalkwyk		Tries: BJ Botha; Con: Rory Kockott; Pen: Rory Kockott (3)	Attendance: 22331; Referee: Mark Lawrence (South Africa)

=== Round 6 ===
21 March 2008	Crusaders (New Zealand)	34–7	(Australia) Waratahs	AMI Stadium, Christchurch
19:35	Tries: Casey Laulala, Mose Tuiali'i, Wyatt Crockett, Scott Hamilton; Con: Dan Carter (4); Pen: Dan Carter (2)		Tries: Wycliff Palu; Con: Kurtley Beale	Attendance: 18,000; Referee: Craig Joubert (South Africa)

21 March 2008	Brumbies (Australia)	29–23	(South Africa) Cheetahs	Canberra Stadium, Canberra
19:40	Tries: Mark Chisholm, Peter Playford, Tyrone Smith, Mitchell Chapman; Con: Mark Gerrard (3); Pen: Mark Gerrard		Tries: Jongi Nokwe, Tewis de Bruyn; Con: Conrad Barnard, Jacques-Louis Potgieter; Pen: Conrad Barnard (2), Jacques-Louis Potgieter	Attendance: 14,076; Referee: Steve Walsh (New Zealand)

22 March 2008	Highlanders (New Zealand)	28–36	(Australia) Western Force	Queenstown Events Centre Oval, Queenstown
14:30	Tries: Paul Williams, Aaron Bancroft, Fetuʻu Vainikolo; Con: Daniel Bowden (2); Pen: Daniel Bowden (3)		Tries: Tom Hockings, Richard Brown, Ryan Cross; Con: Matt Giteau (3); Pen: Matt Giteau (3), Cameron Shepherd (2)	Attendance: 7,500; Referee: Mark Lawrence (South Africa)

22 March 2008	Blues (New Zealand)	17–14	(South Africa) Stormers	Eden Park, Auckland
17:30	Tries: Danny Lee; Pen: Ben Atiga (4)		Tries: Conrad Jantjes; Pen: Peter Grant (3)	Attendance: 18,511; Referee: Paul Marks (Australia)

22 March 2008	Chiefs (New Zealand)	43–27	(South Africa) Bulls	Rotorua International Stadium, Rotorua
19:35	Tries: Brendon Leonard (2), Callum Bruce, Dwayne Sweeney, Lelia Masaga, Liam Messam; Con: Stephen Donald (5); Pen: Stephen Donald		Tries: Wynand Olivier, Deon Stegmann, Akona Ndungane; Con: Derick Hougaard (3); Pen: Derick Hougaard; Drop: Derick Hougaard	Attendance: 6,400; Referee: James Leckie (Australia)

22 March 2008	Lions (South Africa)	24–24	(Australia) Reds	Ellis Park, Johannesburg
17:00	Tries: Joe van Niekerk, Rayno Benjamin; Con: Jano Vermaak; Pen: Jano Vermaak (3); Drop: Jano Vermaak		Tries: Peter Hynes, Rodney Blake, Chris Latham; Con: Clinton Schifcofske (3); Pen: Clinton Schifcofske	Attendance: 5,221; Referee: Bryce Lawrence (New Zealand)

=== Round 7 ===
28 March 2008	Hurricanes (New Zealand)	13–20	(New Zealand) Crusaders	Westpac Stadium, Wellington
19:35	Tries: Andrew Hore; Con: Jimmy Gopperth; Pen: Jimmy Gopperth, Piri Weepu		Tries: Corey Flynn, Ali Williams; Con: Dan Carter (2); Pen: Dan Carter (2)	Attendance: 31,744; Referee: Steve Walsh (New Zealand)

28 March 2008	Waratahs (Australia)	23–19	(South Africa) Cheetahs	Sydney Football Stadium, Sydney
19:40	Tries: Lachlan Turner, Rocky Elsom; Con: Kurtley Beale (2); Pen: Kurtley Beale (3)		Tries: David de Villiers, Jongi Nokwe, Phillip van der Merwe; Con: Meyer Bosman (2)	Attendance: 20,179; Referee: Kelvin Deaker (New Zealand)

28 March 2008	Western Force (Australia)	16–32	(South Africa) Stormers	Subiaco Oval, Perth
20:00	Tries: Drew Mitchell, Ryan Cross; Pen: Matt Giteau (2)		Tries: Tonderai Chavhanga (2), Jean de Villiers, JD Moller; Con: Peter Grant (3); Pen: Peter Grant (2)	Attendance: 24,225; Referee: Lyndon Bray (New Zealand)

29 March 2008	Chiefs (New Zealand)	39–24	(New Zealand) Highlanders	Waikato Stadium, Hamilton
17:30	Tries: Brendon Leonard, Liam Messam, Lelia Masaga (2), Stephen Donald, Mils Muliaina; Con: Stephen Donald (3); Pen: Stephen Donald		Tries: Fetuʻu Vainikolo, Hoani MacDonald (2), Mike Delany; Con: Daniel Bowden (2)	Attendance: 11,495; Referee: Stuart Dickinson (Australia)

29 March 2008	Blues (New Zealand)	23–21	(South Africa) Bulls	Eden Park, Auckland
19:35	Tries: Troy Flavell, Keven Mealamu; Con: Nick Evans (2); Pen: Nick Evans (2); Drop: Nick Evans		Tries: Wikus van Heerden (2), Derick Kuun; Con: Derick Hougaard (3)	Attendance: 22,562; Referee: James Leckie (Australia)

29 March 2008	Sharks (South Africa)	22–10	(Australia) Reds	ABSA Stadium, Durban
17:00	Tries: Odwa Ndungane, Stefan Terblanche, Bismarck du Plessis; Con: Ruan Pienaar, Rory Kockott; Drop: Stefan Terblanche		Tries: David Croft; Con: Clinton Schifcofske; Pen: Clinton Schifcofske	Attendance: 41,339; Referee: Chris Pollock (New Zealand)

=== Round 8 ===
4 April 2008	Highlanders (New Zealand)	29–20	(South Africa) Lions	Carisbrook, Dunedin
19:35	Tries: Paul Williams, Johnny Leota (2), Aaron Bancroft; Con: James Wilson (3); Pen: James Wilson		Tries: Willem Alberts, Jaco van Schalkwyk, Walter Venter; Con: Jaco van Schalkwyk; Pen: Jaco van Schalkwyk	Attendance: 5,600; Referee: Stuart Dickinson (Australia)

4 April 2008	Brumbies (Australia)	28–42	(New Zealand) Chiefs	Canberra Stadium, Canberra
19:40	Tries: Tyrone Smith, Josh Holmes (2), Peter Playford; Con: Stirling Mortlock (4)		Tries: Sitiveni Sivivatu, Callum Bruce, Stephen Donald (2), Viliame Waqaseduadua, Jamie Nutbrown; Con: Stephen Donald (5), Callum Bruce	Attendance: 14,122; Referee: Jonathan Kaplan (South Africa)

4 April 2008	Western Force (Australia)	15–14	(South Africa) Bulls	Subiaco Oval, Perth
19:45	Tries: Matt Giteau, Ryan Cross; Con: Cameron Shepherd; Pen: Cameron Shepherd		Tries: Bryan Habana (2); Con: Derick Hougaard (2)	Attendance: 21,161; Referee: Steve Walsh (New Zealand)

5 April 2008	Hurricanes (New Zealand)	13–13	(South Africa) Sharks	Westpac Stadium, Wellington
19:35	Tries: Andrew Hore; Con: Jimmy Gopperth; Pen: Jimmy Gopperth (2)		Tries: Penalty try Con: François Steyn; Pen: François Steyn, Ruan Pienaar	Attendance: 13,483; Referee: Paul Marks (Australia)

5 April 2008	Waratahs (Australia)	37–16	(New Zealand) Blues	Sydney Football Stadium, Sydney
19:40	Tries: Benn Robinson, Tatafu Polota-Nau, Wycliff Palu, Lote Tuqiri, Dean Mumm; Con: Kurtley Beale (3); Pen: Kurtley Beale (2)		Tries: Troy Flavell, Benson Stanley; Pen: Nick Evans (2)	Attendance: 26,986; Referee: Marius Jonker (South Africa)

5 April 2008	Cheetahs (South Africa)	29–14	(Australia) Reds	Vodacom Park, Bloemfontein
17:00	Tries: Rory Duncan, Meyer Bosman, Duanne Vermeulen, JW Jonker; Con: Jacques-Louis Potgieter (3); Drop: Jacques-Louis Potgieter		Tries: Charlie Fetoai, Brando Va'aulu; Con: Clinton Schifcofske (2)	Attendance: 13,000; Referee: Bryce Lawrence (New Zealand)

=== Round 9 ===
11 April 2008	Highlanders (New Zealand)	17–19	(South Africa) Sharks	Carisbrook, Dunedin
19:35	Tries: Fetuʻu Vainikolo, Clint Newland; Con: James Wilson (2); Pen: James Wilson		Tries: Jacques Botes, Ryan Kankowski; Pen: Ruan Pienaar (2), François Steyn	Referee: Ian Smith (Australia)

12 April 2008	Crusaders (New Zealand)	31–6	(South Africa) Lions	AMI Stadium, Christchurch
17:30	Tries: Sean Maitland, Ti'i Paulo, Caleb Ralph, Andy Ellis; Con: Hamish Gard (2); Pen: Hamish Gard (2)		Pen: Chris Jonck (2)	Referee: Matt Goddard (Australia)

12 April 2008	Blues (New Zealand)	11–16	(Australia) Brumbies	Eden Park, Auckland
19:35	Tries: Rudi Wulf; Pen: Nick Evans (2)		Tries: Christian Lealiifano; Con: Stirling Mortlock; Pen: Stirling Mortlock (2), Mark Gerrard	Referee: Jonathan Kaplan (South Africa)

12 April 2008	Western Force (Australia)	12–17	(Australia) Waratahs	Subiaco Oval, Perth
19:05	Pen: Matt Giteau, Cameron Shepherd (3)		Tries: Rob Horne, Lachlan Turner; Con: Kurtley Beale (2); Pen: Kurtley Beale	Attendance: 22,287; Referee: Brett Bowden (Australia)

12 April 2008	Stormers (South Africa)	34–22	(South Africa) Cheetahs	Newlands, Cape Town
15:00	Tries: Ricky Januarie, Andries Bekker, Conrad Jantjes, Sireli Naqelevuki (2); Con: Peter Grant (3); Pen: Peter Grant		Tries: Heinrich Brüssouw, Conrad Barnard, Richardt Strauss; Con: Conrad Barnard (2); Pen: Jacques-Louis Potgieter	Attendance: 45,000 (approx.); Referee: Mark Lawrence (South Africa)

12 April 2008	Bulls (South Africa)	22–50	(New Zealand) Hurricanes	Loftus Versfeld, Pretoria
17:05	Tries: Pierre Spies, Wikus van Heerden, Jaco Engels; Con: Derick Hougaard, Morné Steyn; Pen: Derick Hougaard		Tries: Ma'a Nonu (2), Chris Masoe, Conrad Smith, Hika Elliot, Shannon Paku, Cory Jane; Con: Jimmy Gopperth (5), Piri Weepu; Pen: Jimmy Gopperth	Referee: James Leckie (Australia)

=== Round 10 ===
18 April 2008	Chiefs (New Zealand)	18–5	(New Zealand) Crusaders	Waikato Stadium, Hamilton
19:35	Tries: Sitiveni Sivivatu, Simms Davison; Con: Stephen Donald; Pen: Stephen Donald (2)		Tries: Andy Ellis	Attendance: 25,000; Referee: Craig Joubert (South Africa)

18 April 2008	Reds (Australia)	29–12	(Australia) Western Force	Suncorp Stadium, Brisbane
19:40	Tries: Leroy Houston, Morgan Turinui, Andrew Walker; Con: Clinton Schifcofske; Pen: Clinton Schifcofske (3), Berrick Barnes		Pen: Cameron Shepherd (4)	Attendance: 18,084; Referee: Stuart Dickinson (Australia)

19 April 2008	Waratahs (Australia)	26–3	(South Africa) Lions	Sydney Football Stadium, Sydney
17:30	Tries: Phil Waugh, Dean Mumm, Tatafu Polota-Nau, Adam Freier; Con: Kurtley Beale (3)		Pen: Jano Vermaak	Attendance: 20,016; Referee: Kelvin Deaker (New Zealand)

19 April 2008	Brumbies (Australia)	27–21	(South Africa) Sharks	Canberra Stadium, Canberra
19:40	Tries: Adam Ashley-Cooper (2), Julian Salvi; Con: Mark Gerrard (3); Pen: Mark Gerrard (2)		Tries: Ryan Kankowski, François Steyn; Con: Rory Kockott; Pen: Rory Kockott, Ruan Pienaar; Drop: François Steyn	Attendance: 13,874; Referee: Bryce Lawrence (New Zealand)

19 April 2008	Bulls (South Africa)	47–17	(New Zealand) Highlanders	Loftus Versfeld, Pretoria
15:00	Tries: Zane Kirchner (2), Akona Ndungane (2), JP Nel, Pedrie Wannenburg, Con: Morné Steyn (4); Pen: Morné Steyn (3)		Tries: Chris King, Tom Donnelly; Con: James Wilson (2); Pen: James Wilson	Attendance: 12,988; Referee: Paul Marks (Australia)

19 April 2008	Stormers (South Africa)	20–12	(New Zealand) Hurricanes	Newlands, Cape Town
17:05	Tries: Andries Bekker, Schalk Brits; Con: Peter Grant (2); Pen: Peter Grant (2)		Tries: Hosea Gear, Conrad Smith; Con: Jimmy Gopperth	Attendance: 43,984; Referee: James Leckie (Australia)

=== Round 11 ===
25 April 2008	Crusaders (New Zealand)	26–22	(New Zealand) Blues	AMI Stadium, Christchurch
19:35	Tries: Corey Flynn (2), Richie McCaw, Ti’i Paulo; Con: Stephen Brett (3)			Referee: Lyndon Bray (New Zealand)

25 April 2008	Brumbies (Australia)	28–21	(South Africa) Lions	Canberra Stadium, Canberra
19:40	Tries: Stirling Mortlock, Mark Gerrard, Christian Lealiifano; Con: Stirling Mortlock, Mark Gerrard; Pen: Stirling Mortlock (2), Mark Gerrard		Tries: Cobus Grobbelaar, Earl Rose (2); Con: Earl Rose (3)	Attendance: 14,078; Referee: Kelvin Deaker (New Zealand)

26 April 2008	Chiefs (New Zealand)	32–20	(Australia) Reds	Waikato Stadium, Hamilton
19:35	Tries: Lelia Masaga (2), Stephen Donald, Sione Lauaki; Con: Stephen Donald (3); Pen: Stephen Donald (2)		Tries: Morgan Turinui (2), Digby Ioane; Con: Clinton Schifcofske; Drop: Berrick Barnes	Referee: Craig Joubert (South Africa)

26 April 2008	Waratahs (Australia)	25–10	(South Africa) Sharks	Sydney Football Stadium, Sydney
19:40	Tries: Wycliff Palu (2), Sam Norton-Knight, Tom Carter; Con: Kurtley Beale; Pen: Lote Tuqiri		Tries: Odwa Ndungane; Con: Rory Kockott; Pen: François Steyn	Attendance: 26,402; Referee: Steve Walsh (New Zealand)

26 April 2008	Cheetahs (South Africa)	10–38	(New Zealand) Hurricanes	GWK Park, Kimberley
15:00	Tries: Jongi Nokwe; Con: Conrad Barnard; Pen: Conrad Barnard		Tries: Jason Eaton, Rodney So'oialo, Ma'a Nonu, Zac Guildford, Cory Jane, Scott Waldrom; Con: Piri Weepu (3), Willie Ripia	Referee: Ian Smith (Australia)

26 April 2008	Stormers (South Africa)	26–16	(New Zealand) Highlanders	Newlands, Cape Town
17:05	Tries: Tiaan Liebenberg, Schalk Brits; Con: Peter Grant (2), Pen: Tony Brown (3), Peter Grant		Tries: Fetuʻu Vainikolo; Con: Blair Stewart; Pen: Mike Delany (3)	Attendance: 41,000 (approx.); Referee: James Leckie (Australia)

=== Round 12 ===
2 May 2008	Crusaders (New Zealand)	18–10	(South Africa) Sharks	AMI Stadium, Christchurch
19:35	Tries: Greg Somerville, Wyatt Crockett; Con: Stephen Brett; Pen: Stephen Brett (2)		Tries: Ryan Kankowski; Con: Rory Kockott; Pen: Rory Kockott	Attendance: 16,000; Referee: Stuart Dickinson (Australia)

2 May 2008	Reds (Australia)	22–35	(New Zealand) Blues	Suncorp Stadium, Brisbane
19:35	Tries: David Croft, Van Humphries, Peter Hynes; Con: Clinton Schifcofske (2); Pen: Clinton Schifcofske		Tries: Jerome Kaino, Isa Nacewa, Kurtis Haiu, Taniela Moa; Con: Nick Evans (3); Pen: Nick Evans (2)	Attendance: 15,732; Referee: Marius Jonker (South Africa)

2 May 2008	Cheetahs (South Africa)	28–31	(New Zealand) Highlanders	Vodacom Park, Bloemfontein
19:10	Tries: JW Jonker, Duanne Vermeulen, Hendro Scholtz, Rory Duncan; Con: Conrad Barnard (2), Meyer Bosman (2)		Tries: Aaron Bancroft (2), Adam Thomson; Con: Mike Delany (2); Pen: Mike Delany (4)	Attendance: 13,491; Referee: Paul Marks (Australia)

3 May 2008	Hurricanes (New Zealand)	38–12	(South Africa) Lions	Westpac Stadium, Wellington
19:35	Tries: Zac Guildford, Andrew Hore, Ma'a Nonu (2), Scott Waldrom; Con: Willie Ripia, Jimmy Gopperth; Pen: Willie Ripia (3)		Tries: Willie Wepener, Jannie Boshoff; Con: Earl Rose	Attendance: 13,986; Referee: Matt Goddard (Australia)

3 May 2008	Western Force (Australia)	22–21	(New Zealand) Chiefs	Subiaco Oval, Perth
19:05	Tries: Matt Hodgson, Drew Mitchell, James Stannard; Con: Matt Giteau (2); Pen: Matt Giteau		Tries: Lelia Masaga, Stephen Donald; Con: Stephen Donald; Pen: Stephen Donald (2); Drop: Callum Bruce	Attendance: 21,549; Referee: Marius Jonker (South Africa)

3 May 2008	Bulls (South Africa)	16–13	(Australia) Waratahs	Loftus Versfeld, Pretoria
15:00	Tries: Derick Kuun; Con: Morné Steyn; Pen: Morné Steyn; Drop: Morné Steyn, Derick Hougaard		Tries: Rob Horne; Con: Kurtley Beale; Pen: Kurtley Beale; Drop: Kurtley Beale	Attendance: 12,410; Referee: Lyndon Bray (New Zealand)

3 May 2008	Stormers (South Africa)	20–10	(Australia) Brumbies	Newlands, Cape Town
17:05	Tries: Jean de Villiers, Penalty try Con: Peter Grant (2); Pen: Peter Grant (2)		Tries: Adam Ashley-Cooper, Peter Kimlin	Attendance: 44,539; Referee: Steve Walsh (New Zealand)

=== Round 13 ===
9 May 2008	Hurricanes (New Zealand)	21–10	(Australia) Western Force	Westpac Stadium, Wellington
19:35	Tries: Andrew Hore, Hosea Gear; Con: Piri Weepu; Pen: Piri Weepu (3)		Tries: Cameron Shepherd; Con: Matt Giteau; Pen: Matt Giteau	Attendance: 16,899; Referee: Jonathan Kaplan (South Africa)

9 May 2008	Bulls (South Africa)	28–17	(Australia) Brumbies	Loftus Versfeld, Pretoria
19:10	Tries: JP Nel, Wikus van Heerden, Wynand Olivier; Con: Morné Steyn (2); Pen: Morné Steyn (3)		Tries: Alister Campbell, Peter Kimlin; Con: Stirling Mortlock (2); Pen: Stirling Mortlock	Attendance: 19,544; Referee: Steve Walsh (New Zealand)

10 May 2008	Highlanders (New Zealand)	15–40	(New Zealand) Blues	Carisbrook, Dunedin
19:35	Tries: Aaron Bancroft, Adam Thomson; Con: Mike Delany; Pen: Mike Delany		Tries: Nick Evans (2), Rudi Wulf, Anthony Tuitavake, David Smith; Con: Nick Evans (2), Ben Atiga; Pen: Nick Evans (3)	Attendance: 8,500; Referee: Chris Pollock (New Zealand)

10 May 2008	Reds (Australia)	21–27	(New Zealand) Crusaders	Suncorp Stadium, Brisbane
19:40	Tries: James Horwill, Peter Hynes, Quade Cooper; Con: Clinton Schifcofske (3)		Tries: Kieran Read, Kade Poki, Ali Williams, Dan Carter; Con: Dan Carter (6); Pen: Stephen Brett	Attendance: 21,768; Referee: Mark Lawrence (South Africa)

10 May 2008	Sharks (South Africa)	33–14	(South Africa) Cheetahs	ABSA Stadium, Durban
15:00	Tries: Jacques Botes (3), Odwa Ndungane (2); Con: Rory Kockott (4)		Tries: Tewis De Bruyn, Meyer Bosman; Con: Conrad Barnard, Tewis De Bruyn	Attendance: 24,850; Referee: Willie Roos (South Africa)

10 May 2008	Lions (South Africa)	33–27	(New Zealand) Chiefs	Ellis Park, Johannesburg
17:05	Tries: Chris Jonck, Willem Alberts, Cobus Grobbelaar; Con: Earl Rose (3); Pen: Earl Rose (4)		Tries: Aled de Malmanche, Lelia Masaga, Mils Muliaina; Con: Stephen Donald (3); Pen: Stephen Donald (2)	Attendance: 4,500; Referee: Stuart Dickinson (Australia)

10 May 2008	Stormers (South Africa)	13–13	(Australia) Waratahs	Newlands, Cape Town
19:10	Tries: Sireli Naqelevuki, Wylie Human; Pen: Tony Brown		Tries: Lote Tuqiri; Con: Kurtley Beale; Pen: Kurtley Beale (2)	Attendance: 45,712; Referee: Lyndon Bray (New Zealand)

=== Round 14 ===
16 May 2008	Blues (New Zealand)	19–17	(New Zealand) Hurricanes	Eden Park, Auckland
19:35	Tries: Anthony Boric; Con: Nick Evans; Pen: Nick Evans (4)		Tries: Hosea Gear (2); Con: Piri Weepu (2); Pen: Piri Weepu	Attendance: 37,352; Referee: Bryce Lawrence (New Zealand)

16 May 2008	Western Force (Australia)	29–22	(Australia) Brumbies	Subiaco Oval, Perth
19:05	Tries: James O'Connor, Josh Tatupu, Matt Giteau, Chris O'Young; Con: Matt Giteau (3); Pen: Matt Giteau		Tries: Francis Fainifo (2), Mark Gerrard, Adam Ashley-Cooper; Con: Stirling Mortlock	Attendance: 21,350; Referee: Nathan Pearce (Australia)

17 May 2008	Crusaders (New Zealand)	14–26	(New Zealand) Highlanders	AMI Stadium, Christchurch
19:35	Tries: Corey Flynn (4); Pen: Dan Carter (6)		Tries: Paul Williams, Toby Morland, Adam Thomson; Con: Mike Delany; Pen: Mike Delany (3)	Referee: Keith Brown (New Zealand)

17 May 2008	Reds (Australia)	11–18	(Australia) Waratahs	Suncorp Stadium, Brisbane
19:40	Tries: Peter Hynes; Pen: Clinton Schifcofske (2)		Tries: Dean Mumm, Wycliff Palu; Con: Kurtley Beale; Pen: Kurtley Beale (2)	Attendance: 27,688; Referee: Matt Goddard (Australia)

17 May 2008	Lions (South Africa)	13–22	(South Africa) Stormers	Ellis Park, Johannesburg
15:00	Tries: Earl Rose, Jannie Boshoff; Pen: Earl Rose		Tries: Jean de Villiers, Sireli Naqelevuki, Robbie Diack; Con: Peter Grant (2); Pen: Peter Grant	Referee: Marius Jonker (South Africa)

17 May 2008	Cheetahs (South Africa)	20–60	(South Africa) Bulls	Vodacom Park, Bloemfontein
17:05	Tries: JW Jonker, Jongi Nokwe; Con: Tewis de Bruyn; Pen: Tewis de Bruyn		Tries: Akona Ndungane (2), Pierre Spies, Bryan Habana (2), Morné Steyn, Werner Kruger, Zane Kirchner; Con: Morné Steyn (7); Pen: Morné Steyn; Drop:Morné Steyn	Referee: Phillip Bosch (South Africa)

17 May 2008	Sharks (South Africa)	47–25	(New Zealand) Chiefs	ABSA Stadium, Durban
19:10	Tries: Ruan Pienaar, Adrian Jacobs, Bismarck du Plessis, Steven Sykes, Ryan Kankowski (2), Odwa Ndungane; Con: Rory Kockott (6)		Tries: Faifili Levave, Mils Muliaina, Viliame Waqaseduadua; Con: Stephen Donald (2); Pen: Stephen Donald	Referee: Stuart Dickinson (Australia)

== Finals ==
=== Semi finals ===
24 May 2008
19:35

Crusaders (New Zealand)	33–22	(New Zealand) Hurricanes
Tries: Leon MacDonald (2), Kieran Read; Con: Dan Carter (3); Pen: Dan Carter (4)		Tries: Zac Guildford, Jeremy Thrush, Neemia Tialata; Con: Jimmy Gopperth, Jerry Collins; Pen: Piri Weepu

AMI Stadium, Christchurch
Attendance: 18,000
Referee: Stuart Dickinson (Australia)

24 May 2008
20:00

Waratahs (Australia)	28–13	(South Africa) Sharks
Tries: Lote Tuqiri, Rob Horne, Kurtley Beale, Luke Burgess; Con: Kurtley Beale; Pen: Kurtley Beale; Drop: Kurtley Beale		Tries: Craig Burden; Con: Rory Kockott; Pen: Ruan Pienaar; Drop: Ruan Pienaar

Sydney Football Stadium, Sydney
Attendance: 37,378
Referee: Bryce Lawrence (New Zealand)

=== Grand final ===
The final of the 2008 Super 14 season took place on 31 May 2008 at AMI Stadium in Christchurch, New Zealand. The match was hosted by the Crusaders who defeated the New South Wales Waratahs by 20 points to 12.

==== Summary ====
First half The Crusaders scored the first points of the game when fly-half Dan Carter kicked a penalty in the fourth minute, giving the Crusaders a 3–0 lead. The Waratahs scored their first points of the match when Kurtley Beale kicked the ball across field, and Waratah's winger Lachlan Turner caught the ball to score a try. The attempted conversion by Beale was unsuccessful, leaving the Waratahs with a 5–3 lead.

The next score occurred in the 25th minute when Waratahs flanker Phil Waugh intercepted a pass from Dan Carter. Waugh passed to Turner who chipped the ball and then collected to score his second try. Beale's conversion was successful and the Waratahs extended their lead to 12–3. Carter kicked a penalty in the 32nd minute to reduce the Waratahs lead to 12–6. The final score before half time came in the 38th minute when Crusaders No. 8 Mose Tuiali'i scored in the right hand corner. Carter's conversion was unsuccessful, and the half ended with the Waratahs leading by 12 points to 11.

Second half In the 46th minute the Crusaders took the lead again by 14 points to 12 via a Dan Carter penalty. The Crusaders looked to have scored their second try in the 56th minute when prop Wyatt Crockett landed on a loose ball in the Waratahs in-goal area, but play was taken back 60 metres after touch judge Cobus Wessels reported that Crusaders lock Brad Thorn had thrown a punch. The try was disallowed and the Crusaders penalised. Thorn was given a yellow card and sent to the sin bin for ten minutes.

Despite having an extra man for the next ten minutes, the Waratahs were unable to score, and were further hampered by the loss of Kurtley Beale to injury. In the 70th minute Carter kicked a drop-goal to take the Crusaders lead to 17–12, and four minutes later kicked a penalty to further extend the lead to 20–12. With only minutes remaining Crusaders winger Scott Hamilton dropped the ball only metres from the Waratahs try-line. The score remained at 20–12, and the Crusaders won their seventh Super rugby title.

==== Match details ====
31 May 2008
19:35

Crusaders (New Zealand)	20–12	(Australia) Waratahs
Tries: Tuiali'i; Pen: Carter (4); Drop: Carter	(Report)	Tries: Turner (2); Con: Beale

AMI Stadium, Christchurch
Attendance: 26,000
Referee: Mark Lawrence (South Africa)

FB	15	Leon MacDonald
RW	14	Kade Poki
CT	13	Casey Laulala
SF	12	Tim Bateman
LW	11	Scott Hamilton
FF	10	Dan Carter
HB	9	Andy Ellis
N8	8	Mose Tuiali'i
OF	7	Richie McCaw
BF	6	Kieran Read
RL	5	Ali Williams
LL	4	Brad Thorn
TP	3	Greg Somerville
HK	2	Ti’i Paulo
LP	1	Wyatt Crockett
Substitutes:
HK	16	Steve Fualau
LP	17	Ben Franks
RL	18	Reuben Thorne
N8	19	Nasi Manu
HB	20	Kahn Fotuali'i
FF	21	Stephen Brett
RW	22	Sean Maitland
Coach:
(New Zealand) Robbie Deans

FB	15	Sam Norton-Knight
RW	14	Lachlan Turner
CT	13	Rob Horne
SF	12	Tom Carter
LW	11	Lote Tuqiri
FF	10	Kurtley Beale
HB	9	Luke Burgess
N8	8	Wycliff Palu
OF	7	Phil Waugh
BF	6	Rocky Elsom
RL	5	Dean Mumm
LL	4	Dan Vickerman
TP	3	Al Baxter
HK	2	Tatafu Polota-Nau
LP	1	Benn Robinson
Substitutions:
HK	16	Adam Freier
LP	17	Matt Dunning
RL	18	Will Caldwell
N8	19	Beau Robinson
HB	20	Brett Sheehan
FF	21	Matthew Carraro
FB	22	Timana Tahu
Coach:
(Australia) Ewen McKenzie

Touch judges:
Craig Joubert (South Africa)
Cobus Wessels (South Africa)
Television match official:
Shaun Veldsman (South Africa)

== Player statistics ==
=== Leading try scorers ===
Top 3 try scorers (Stats)
Pos	Name	Tries	Pld	Team
1	Lelia Masaga	8	11	Chiefs
2	Ma'a Nonu	7	11	Hurricanes
3	Fetuʻu Vainikolo	6	10	Highlanders
3	Stephen Donald	6	11	Chiefs
5	Jacques Botes	6	14	Sharks
5	Odwa Ndungane	6	13	Sharks
7	Ryan Kankowski	5	14	Sharks
7	John Roe	5	9	Reds
7	Peter Hynes	5	13	Reds
7	Andy Ellis	5	8	Crusaders
7	Akona Ndungane	5	8	Bulls
7	Jongi Nokwe	5	10	Cheetahs
7	Wycliff Palu	5	10	Waratahs
7	Andrew Hore	5	11	Hurricanes
7	Dan Carter	5	11	Crusaders

=== Leading point scorers ===
Top 3 overall point scorers (Stats)
Pos	Name	Points	Pld	Team
1	Stephen Donald	143 (6T, 28C, 19P)	12	Chiefs
2	Nick Evans	136 (4T, 22C, 23P)	11	Blues
3	Dan Carter	112 (5T, 24C, 13P)	8	Crusaders
