= 2008 Queensland Reds season =

Queensland Reds 2008 rugby season

Coordinates: 27°27′53″S 153°0′34″E

This article covers the 2008 Super 14 season results and statistics of Super Rugby side, the Reds.

== Regular season ==
=== Week 1 ===
19:05 2008-02-15

| Reds | 22–16 | Highlanders |
| Tries: John Roe (2), Clinton Schifcofske; Con: Clinton Schifcofske (2); Pen: Clinton Schifcofske | | Tries:Adam Thomson; Con: Mike Delany; Pen: Paul Williams (2), Daniel Bowden |

Suncorp Stadium, Brisbane
Attendance: 19,183
Referee: Marius Jonker (South Africa)

=== Week 2 ===
19:35 2008-02-22

| Hurricanes | 23–18 | Reds |
| Tries: Tane Tu’ipulotu, Ma'a Nonu; Con: Jimmy Gopperth (2); Pen: Jimmy Gopperth (3) | | Tries: Van Humphries, John Roe; Con: Clinton Schifcofske; Pen: Clinton Schifcofske (2) |

Westpac Stadium, Wellington
Attendance: 15,682
Referee: Mark Lawrence (South Africa)

=== Week 3 ===
19:40 2008-03-01

| Brumbies | 43–11 | Reds |
| Tries:Mark Chisholm (2), Mark Gerrard, Ben Alexander, Peter Playford, Stephen Hoiles; Con:Mark Gerrard (5); Pen:Mark Gerrard | | Tries: John Roe, Pen:Clinton Schifcofske (2) |

Canberra Stadium, Canberra
Attendance: 15,244
Referee: Lyndon Bray (New Zealand)

=== Week 4 ===
19:05 2008-03-08

| Reds | 16 – 34 | Stormers |
| Tries: Chris Latham, Leroy Houston; Con: Pen: Drop: Berrick Barnes (2) | | Tries: Peter Grant, Luke Watson, Tonderai Chavhanga, Bolla Conradie; Con: Peter Grant (4); Pen: Peter Grant (2) |

Suncorp Stadium, Brisbane
Attendance: 17,830
Referee: Chris Pollock (New Zealand)

=== Week 5 ===
19:05 2008-03-15

| Reds | 40 – 8 | Bulls |
| Tries: Chris Latham, Peter Hynes, Clinton Schifcofske, Morgan Turinui, John Roe; Con: Clinton Schifcofske (3); Pen: Clinton Schifcofske (3) | | Tries: Fourie du Preez; Con: Pen: Derick Hougaard |

Suncorp Stadium, Brisbane
Attendance: 14,411
Referee: Lyndon Bray (New Zealand)

=== Week 6 ===
17:00 2008-03-22

| Lions | 24 – 24 | Reds |
| Tries:Joe van Niekerk, Rayno Benjamin; Con:Jano Vermaak; Pen:Jano Vermaak (3); Drop:Jano Vermaak | | Tries:Peter Hynes, Rodney Blake, Chris Latham; Con:Clinton Schifcofske (3); Pen:Clinton Schifcofske |

Ellis Park, Johannesburg
Attendance: 5,221
Referee: Bryce Lawrence (New Zealand)

=== Week 7 ===
17:00 2008-03-29

| Sharks | 22 – 10 | Reds |
| Tries:Odwa Ndungane, Stefan Terblanche, Bismarck du Plessis; Con:Ruan Pienaar, Rory Kockott; Pen: Drop:Stefan Terblanche | | Tries:David Croft; Con:Clinton Schifcofske; Pen:Clinton Schifcofske |

ABSA Stadium, Durban
Referee: Chris Pollock (New Zealand)

=== Week 8 ===
17:00 2008-04-05

| Cheetahs | 29– 14 | Reds |
| Tries:Rory Duncan, Meyer Bosman, Duanne Vermeulen, JW Jonker; Con:Jacques-Louis Potgieter (3); Pen: Drop:Jacques-Louis Potgieter | | Tries:Charlie Fetoai, Brando Va'aulu; Con:Clinton Schifcofske (2); Pen: |

Vodacom Park, Bloemfontein
Referee: Bryce Lawrence (New Zealand)

=== Week 9 ===
Bye
| Chiefs | Reds |

=== Week 10 ===
19:40 2008-04-18

| Reds | 29 – 12 | Force |
| Tries: Leroy Houston, Morgan Turinui, Andrew Walker; Con: Clinton Schifcofske; Pen: Clinton Schifcofske (3), Berrick Barnes | | Tries: Con: Pen: Cameron Shepherd (4) |

Suncorp Stadium, Brisbane
Attendance: 18,084
Referee: Stuart Dickinson (Australia)

=== Week 11 ===
19:35 2008-04-26

| Chiefs | 32 – 20 | Reds |
| Tries:Lelia Masaga (2), Stephen Donald, Sione Lauaki; Con: Stephen Donald (3); Pen: Stephen Donald (2) | | Tries:Morgan Turinui (2), Digby Ioane; Con: Clinton Schifcofske; Pen: Drop: Berrick Barnes |

Waikato Stadium, Hamilton
Referee: Craig Joubert (South Africa)

=== Week 12 ===
19:35 2008-05-02

| Reds | 22 – 35 | Blues |
| Tries:David Croft, Van Humphries, Peter Hynes; Con:Clinton Schifcofske (2); Pen:Clinton Schifcofske | | Tries:Jerome Kaino, Isa Nacewa, Kurtis Haiu, Taniela Moa; Con:Nick Evans (3); Pen:Nick Evans (2) |

Suncorp Stadium, Brisbane
Referee: Marius Jonker (South Africa)

=== Week 13 ===
19:40 2008-05-10

| Reds | 21 – 27 | Crusaders |
| Tries:James Horwill, Peter Hynes, Quade Cooper; Con: Clinton Schifcofske (3); Pen: | | Tries:Kieran Read, Kade Poki, Ali Williams, Dan Carter; Con: Dan Carter (2); Pen: Stephen Brett |

Suncorp Stadium, Brisbane
Attendance: 21,768
Referee: Mark Lawrence (South Africa)

=== Week 14 ===
19:40 2008-05-17

| Reds | 11 – 18 | Waratahs |
| Tries:Peter Hynes; Pen:Clinton Schifcofske (2) | | Tries:Dean Mumm, Wycliff Palu; Con:Kurtley Beale; Pen:Kurtley Beale (2) |

Suncorp Stadium, Brisbane
Attendance: 27,688
Referee: Matt Goddard (Australia)

== Table ==
2008 Super 14 table
| Pos | Team | Pld | W | D | L | PF | PA | PD | B | Pts | Qualification |
|---|---|---|---|---|---|---|---|---|---|---|---|
| 1 | (New Zealand) Crusaders | 13 | 11 | 0 | 2 | 369 | 176 | +193 | 8 | 52 | Advance to playoffs |
| 2 | (Australia) Waratahs | 13 | 9 | 1 | 3 | 255 | 186 | +69 | 5 | 43 | Advance to playoffs |
| 3 | (South Africa) Sharks | 13 | 9 | 1 | 3 | 271 | 209 | +62 | 4 | 42 | Advance to playoffs |
| 4 | (New Zealand) Hurricanes | 13 | 8 | 1 | 4 | 310 | 204 | +106 | 7 | 41 | Advance to playoffs |
| 5 | (South Africa) Stormers | 13 | 8 | 1 | 4 | 269 | 211 | +58 | 7 | 41 | |
| 6 | (New Zealand) Blues | 13 | 8 | 0 | 5 | 354 | 267 | +87 | 8 | 40 | |
| 7 | (New Zealand) Chiefs | 13 | 7 | 0 | 6 | 348 | 349 | −1 | 6 | 34 | |
| 8 | (Australia) Force | 13 | 7 | 0 | 6 | 247 | 278 | −31 | 4 | 32 | |
| 9 | (Australia) Brumbies | 13 | 6 | 0 | 7 | 277 | 317 | −40 | 6 | 30 | |
| 10 | (South Africa) Bulls | 13 | 6 | 0 | 7 | 324 | 347 | −23 | 4 | 28 | |
| 11 | (New Zealand) Highlanders | 13 | 3 | 0 | 10 | 257 | 338 | −81 | 7 | 19 | |
| 12 | (Australia) Reds | 13 | 3 | 1 | 9 | 258 | 323 | −65 | 4 | 18 | |
| 13 | (South Africa) Cheetahs | 13 | 1 | 0 | 12 | 255 | 428 | −173 | 9 | 13 | |
| 14 | (South Africa) Lions | 13 | 2 | 1 | 10 | 206 | 367 | −161 | 2 | 12 | |

Updated to match(es) played on 2008-05-17. Source:
