= 2008 Super 14 final =

Men's rugby union club competition

2008 Super 14 Final
| Home Team | Crusaders |
| Away Team | Waratahs |
| Result | Crusaders 20 Waratahs 12 |
| Date | 31 May 2008 |
| Stadium | AMI Stadium, Christchurch |

The final of the 2008 Super 14 season, a provincial rugby union competition in the Southern Hemisphere, took place on 31 May 2008 at AMI Stadium in Christchurch, New Zealand. The match was hosted by the Canterbury Crusaders who defeated the New South Wales Waratahs by 20 points to 12.

== Road to the Final ==
The Crusaders and Waratahs finished the round-robin first and second on the Super 14 table respectively. The Crusaders finished nine points clear of second place, and had secured a top of the table position prior to the last week of the round-robin. The Waratahs only secured second place, and a place in the finals in the last round of the competition. The Hurricanes lost to the Blues in their final-match of the round robin, and the Waratah's defeat of the Queensland Reds allowed them to leap the Hurricanes into second place. The Sharks bonus point defeat of the Chiefs in Durban secured them third place on the table.

The Crusaders then hosted the Hurricanes in Christchurch, and the Waratahs hosted the Sharks in Sydney. The Crusaders defeated the Hurricanes 33–22 with three tries each, and the Waratahs defeated the Sharks 28–13. The Crusaders eventually prevailed in a toughly fought final, 20–12.

2008 Super 14 table
| Pos | Team | Pld | W | D | L | PF | PA | PD | B | Pts | Qualification |
|---|---|---|---|---|---|---|---|---|---|---|---|
| 1 | (New Zealand) Crusaders | 13 | 11 | 0 | 2 | 369 | 176 | +193 | 8 | 52 | Advance to playoffs |
| 2 | (Australia) Waratahs | 13 | 9 | 1 | 3 | 255 | 186 | +69 | 5 | 43 | Advance to playoffs |
| 3 | (South Africa) Sharks | 13 | 9 | 1 | 3 | 271 | 209 | +62 | 4 | 42 | Advance to playoffs |
| 4 | (New Zealand) Hurricanes | 13 | 8 | 1 | 4 | 310 | 204 | +106 | 7 | 41 | Advance to playoffs |
| 5 | (South Africa) Stormers | 13 | 8 | 1 | 4 | 269 | 211 | +58 | 7 | 41 | |
| 6 | (New Zealand) Blues | 13 | 8 | 0 | 5 | 354 | 267 | +87 | 8 | 40 | |
| 7 | (New Zealand) Chiefs | 13 | 7 | 0 | 6 | 348 | 349 | −1 | 6 | 34 | |
| 8 | (Australia) Force | 13 | 7 | 0 | 6 | 247 | 278 | −31 | 4 | 32 | |
| 9 | (Australia) Brumbies | 13 | 6 | 0 | 7 | 277 | 317 | −40 | 6 | 30 | |
| 10 | (South Africa) Bulls | 13 | 6 | 0 | 7 | 324 | 347 | −23 | 4 | 28 | |
| 11 | (New Zealand) Highlanders | 13 | 3 | 0 | 10 | 257 | 338 | −81 | 7 | 19 | |
| 12 | (Australia) Reds | 13 | 3 | 1 | 9 | 258 | 323 | −65 | 4 | 18 | |
| 13 | (South Africa) Cheetahs | 13 | 1 | 0 | 12 | 255 | 428 | −173 | 9 | 13 | |
| 14 | (South Africa) Lions | 13 | 2 | 1 | 10 | 206 | 367 | −161 | 2 | 12 | |

Updated to match(es) played on 2008-05-17. Source:

Semi-finals
2008-05-24 - AMI Stadium, Christchurch
Crusaders | 33
Hurricanes | 22
2008-05-24 - Sydney Football Stadium, Sydney
Waratahs | 28
Sharks | 13

Final
2008-05-31 - AMI Stadium, Christchurch
Crusaders | 20
Waratahs | 12

== Match ==
=== First half ===
The Crusaders scored the first points of the game when Fly-half Dan Carter kicked a penalty in the fourth minute, giving the Crusaders a 3–0 lead. The Waratahs scored their first points of the match when Kurtley Beale kicked the ball across field, and Waratah's winger Lachlan Turner caught the ball to score a try. The attempted conversion by Beale was unsuccessful, leaving the Waratahs with a 5–3 lead.

The next score occurred in the 25th minute when Waratahs flanker Phil Waugh intercepted a pass from Dan Carter. Waugh passed to Turner who chipped the ball and then collected to score his second try. Beale's conversion was successful and the Waratahs extended their lead to 12–3. Carter kicked a penalty in the 32nd minute to reduce the Waratah's lead to 12–6. The final score before half time came in the 38th minute when Crusaders No. 8 Mose Tuiali'i scored in the right hand corner. Carter's conversion was unsuccessful, and the half ended with the Waratahs leading by 12 points to 11.

=== Second half ===
In the 46th minute the Crusaders took the lead again by 14 points to 12 via a Dan Carter penalty. The Crusaders looked to have scored their second try in the 56th minute when prop Wyatt Crockett landed on a loose ball in the Waratah's in-goal area, but play was taken back 60 metres after touch judge Cobus Wessels reported that Crusaders lock Brad Thorn had thrown a punch. The try was disallowed and the Crusaders penalised. Thorn was given a yellow card and sent to the sin bin for ten minutes.

Despite having an extra man for the next ten minutes, the Waratahs were unable to score, and were further hampered by the loss of Kurtley Beale to injury. In the 70th minute Carter kicked a drop-goal to take the Crusaders lead to 17–12, and four minutes later kicked a penalty to further extend the lead to 20–12. With only minutes remaining Crusaders winger Scott Hamilton dropped the ball only metres from the Waratahs try-line. The score remained at 20–12, and the Crusaders won their seventh Super rugby title.

== Match details ==
2008-05-31
19:35

| Crusaders | 20 – 12 | Waratahs |
| Tries: Tuiali'i; Pen: Carter (4); Drop: Carter | (Report) | Tries: Turner (2); Con: Beale |

AMI Stadium, Christchurch
Attendance: 26,000
Referee: Mark Lawrence (South Africa)

| Crusaders | Waratahs |

CRUSADERS:
| FB | 15 | Leon MacDonald |
| RW | 14 | Kade Poki |
| CT | 13 | Casey Laulala |
| SF | 12 | Tim Bateman |
| LW | 11 | Scott Hamilton |
| FF | 10 | Dan Carter |
| HB | 9 | Andrew Ellis |
| N8 | 8 | Mose Tuiali'i |
| OF | 7 | Richie McCaw |
| BF | 6 | Kieran Read |
| RL | 5 | Ali Williams |
| LL | 4 | Brad Thorn |
| TP | 3 | Greg Somerville |
| HK | 2 | Ti’i Paulo |
| LP | 1 | Wyatt Crockett |
Substitutes:
| HK | 16 | Steve Fualau |
| LP | 17 | Ben Franks |
| RL | 18 | Reuben Thorne |
| N8 | 19 | Nasi Manu |
| HB | 20 | Kahn Fotuali'i |
| FF | 21 | Stephen Brett |
| RW | 22 | Sean Maitland |
Coach:
(New Zealand) Robbie Deans

WARATAHS:
| FB | 15 | Sam Norton-Knight |
| RW | 14 | Lachlan Turner |
| CT | 13 | Rob Horne |
| SF | 12 | Tom Carter |
| LW | 11 | Lote Tuqiri |
| FF | 10 | Kurtley Beale |
| HB | 9 | Luke Burgess |
| N8 | 8 | Wycliff Palu |
| OF | 7 | Phil Waugh |
| BF | 6 | Rocky Elsom |
| RL | 5 | Dean Mumm |
| LL | 4 | Dan Vickerman |
| TP | 3 | Al Baxter |
| HK | 2 | Tatafu Polota-Nau |
| LP | 1 | Benn Robinson |
Substitutions:
| HK | 16 | Adam Freier |
| LP | 17 | Matt Dunning |
| RL | 18 | Will Caldwell |
| N8 | 19 | Beau Robinson |
| HB | 20 | Brett Sheehan |
| FF | 21 | Matthew Carraro |
| FB | 22 | Timana Tahu |
Coach:
(Australia) Ewen McKenzie

Touch judges:
(South Africa) Craig Joubert
(South Africa) Cobus Wessels
Television match official:
(South Africa) Shaun Veldsman

== Notes ==
| Preceded by 2007 Super 14 Final | Super 14 Final; 2008 | Succeeded by 2009 Super 14 Final |
