= Ndungane =

Ndungane is a surname. Notable people with the surname include:

- Akona Ndungane (born 1981), South African rugby union player
- Odwa Ndungane (born 1981), South African rugby union player, twin of Akona
- Njongonkulu Ndungane (born 1941), Archbishop of Cape Town
- Sbabalwe Ndungane (born 2002), South Africa rowing athlete at UFHRC
