= Vainikolo =

Vainikolo is a Tongan surname. Notable people with the surname include:

- Fetuʻu Vainikolo (born 1985), Tongan rugby union player
- Lesley Vainikolo (born 1979), New Zealand/English rugby union player
