= Hudson Park High School =

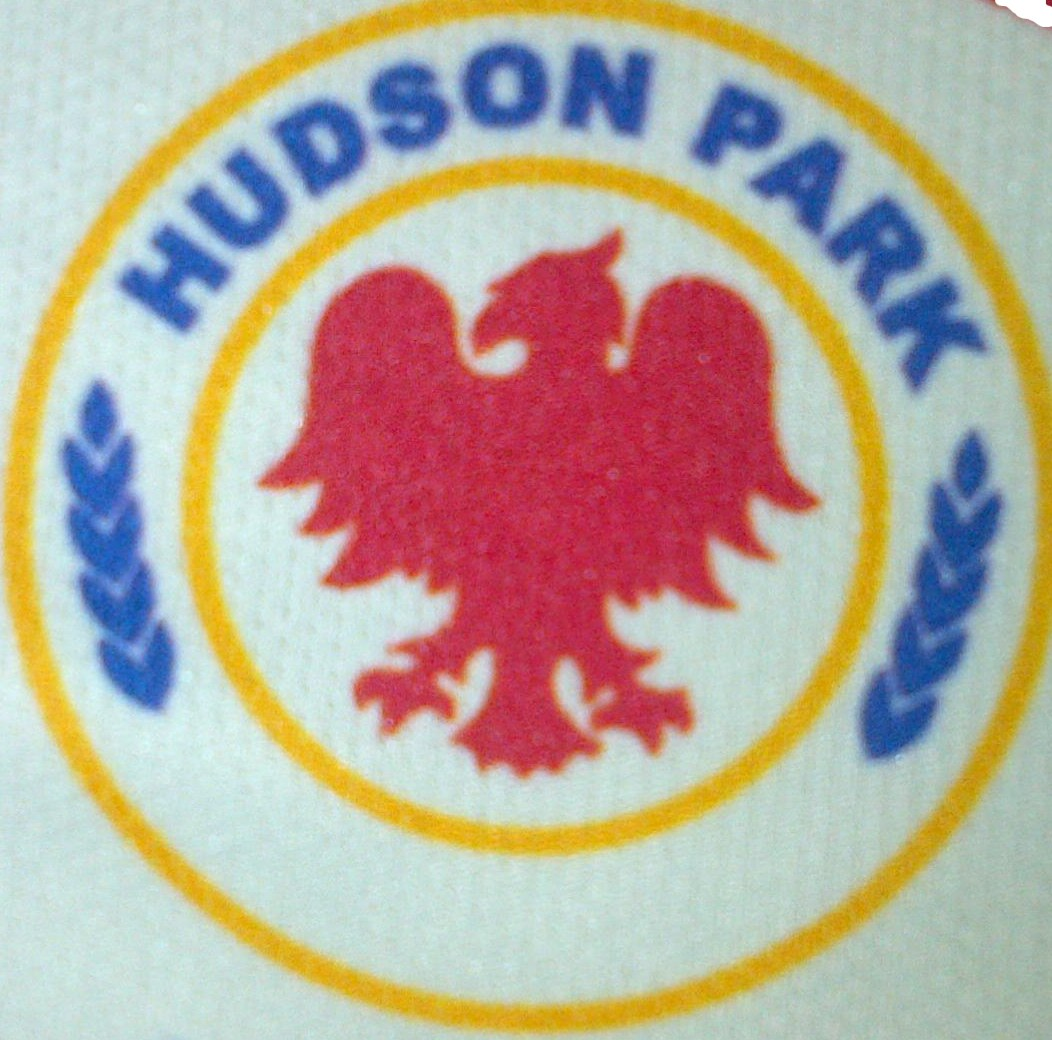
- Hudson Park High School crest

Location
- 113 Devereux Avenue, Vincent; East London, Eastern Cape; South Africa
- 32°59′08″S 27°54′56″E

Information
- School type: Public & Boarding
- Motto: Tentando Superabis (Latin:"By endeavour we will succeed")
- Religious affiliation: Christianity
- Established: 5 August 1905; 120 years ago
- Locale: Suburban
- School number: +27 (043) 726 3205
- Headmaster: Mr D Vorster
- Staff: 100 full-time
- Grades: 8–12
- Gender: Boys & Girls
- Age: 14 to 18
- Enrollment: 1,300 pupils
- Language: English
- Schedule: 07:30 - 14:20
- Campus: Urban Campus
- Houses: Boarding Houses: Highbury Terrace; Hampton House; Day Houses: Bucholtz; Lake; Malin
- Colours: Blue; Red; White
- Song: The Song of Eagle
- Nickname: Parkies
- Rivals: Cambridge High School; Stirling High School
- Accreditation: Eastern Cape Department of Education
- School fees: R48,000 (boarding); R41,800 (tuition)
- Alumni: Old Hudsonian Association

Hudson Park High School is a public English medium co-educational high school situated in the suburb of Vincent in KuGompo City in the Eastern Cape province of South Africa. Hudson Park is historically among the top academic and athletically inclined schools in East London, showing great prowess particularly in rugby, netball, cricket and water polo. The school was established on 5 August 1905.

== History ==
A small primary school, catering for the Clifton area, was established in 1905 and housed in the St. Alban's Church hall. In 1912, buildings were erected on the present site and the school began to grow exponentially. It became a secondary school in 1959 and was officially named Clifton Park High School in 1965. It was during this period that the present uniform, badge and school song, "The Song Of The Eagle," were established.

In 1978, the Primary Department amalgamated with Hudson Park Primary School and the school changed its name to Hudson Park High School. The Grade 7 class remained with the high school until 1985, at which time it was decided that the growth of the senior school required that Grade 7 should move to join the primary school. In 1991 the school opened its doors to pupils of all races.

1993 saw a new administration and classroom block, as well as new garages, and renovations were made to the entire school. Williams House was renovated to provide a music centre for the school. The extensions were opened in August 1994 by the Minister of Sport, Mr Steve Tshwete.

== Sports ==
Sports offered by the school include:

- Athletics
- Cricket
- Cross country
- Hockey (Boys & Girls)
- Netball (Girls)
- Rugby (Boys)
- Football (soccer)
- Squash
- Swimming
- Table tennis
- Tennis
- Water polo

== Notable alumni ==
List of matriculants of Hudson Park High School are in alphabetical order.

- Warwick Hinkel (Class of 1999) - South African cricketer
- Vinny Lingham (Class of 1996) - South African Internet entrepreneur
- Scott Kemp (Class of 1992) South African rugby player
- Akona Ndungane (Class of 1999) - South African rugby player
- Odwa Ndungane (Class of 1999) - South African rugby player
- Andisa Gqobo (Class of 2005) - South African rugby player
- Onke Dubase (Class of 2007) - South African rugby player
- Alulutho Tshakweni (Class of 2016) - South African rugby player
- Uzile Tele (Class of 2018)- South African rugby player
- Sibabalwe Mahashe (Class of 2022) South African rugby player
- Sivu Mabece (Class of 2022) South African rugby player
