= Keta Iongi =

Female Tongan athlete

- Iongi with her medals

Personal information
- National team: Tonga
- Born: 5 August 1947 Nukunuku, Tonga
- Died: 22 February 2017 (aged 69)

Sport
- Sport: Track and field
- Events: 100 metres; 200 metres; 80 metre hurdles; 100 metre hurdles; modern pentathlon

Keta Iongi (1947–2017) was a female athlete who competed for Tonga at the South Pacific Games and at the British Commonwealth Games as a sprinter and hurdler and in the modern pentathlon.

== Family ==
Keta Iongi Palu was born on 5 August 1947. She came from an athletic family. Her brother, Kei, played rugby union for Tonga and her sister, Kalasi, was also an international athlete. Her son, Wycliff Palu, played professional rugby in Australia and she was an aunt to the Australian netball player Mo'onia Gerrard, the Australian professional rugby union player, Mark Gerrard, and the Tongan rugby player Sioeli Iongi, who played in Japan.

== Sporting activities ==
Iongi took part in the 1969 South Pacific Games in Port Moresby, capital of Papua New Guinea. She won four gold medals, in the 100 metres, 200 metres, 80 metres hurdles and the pentathlon and soon after returning to Tonga she was Knighted by His Majesty King Tupou IV the name Va'ekoula 'oe Tahi Pasifiki Saute which means The Golden Legs of the South Pacific Seas. In the 1971 South Pacific Games, held in Papeete in French Polynesia, she won a gold in the 100 metres, a silver in the 100 metres hurdles and a bronze in the 200 metres. Her sister also competed in Papeete. Iongi also took part in the 1974 British Commonwealth Games, which were held in Christchurch, New Zealand. Here she was less successful, failing to move beyond the first round of heats.

She was inducted into the Tonga National Sports Hall of Fame in 2009.

== Death ==
Keta Iongi died on 22 February 2017.

== Honours ==
National honours

- Order of Queen Sālote Tupou III, Member (31 July 2008).
