= Hamish Gard =

New Zealand rugby union player

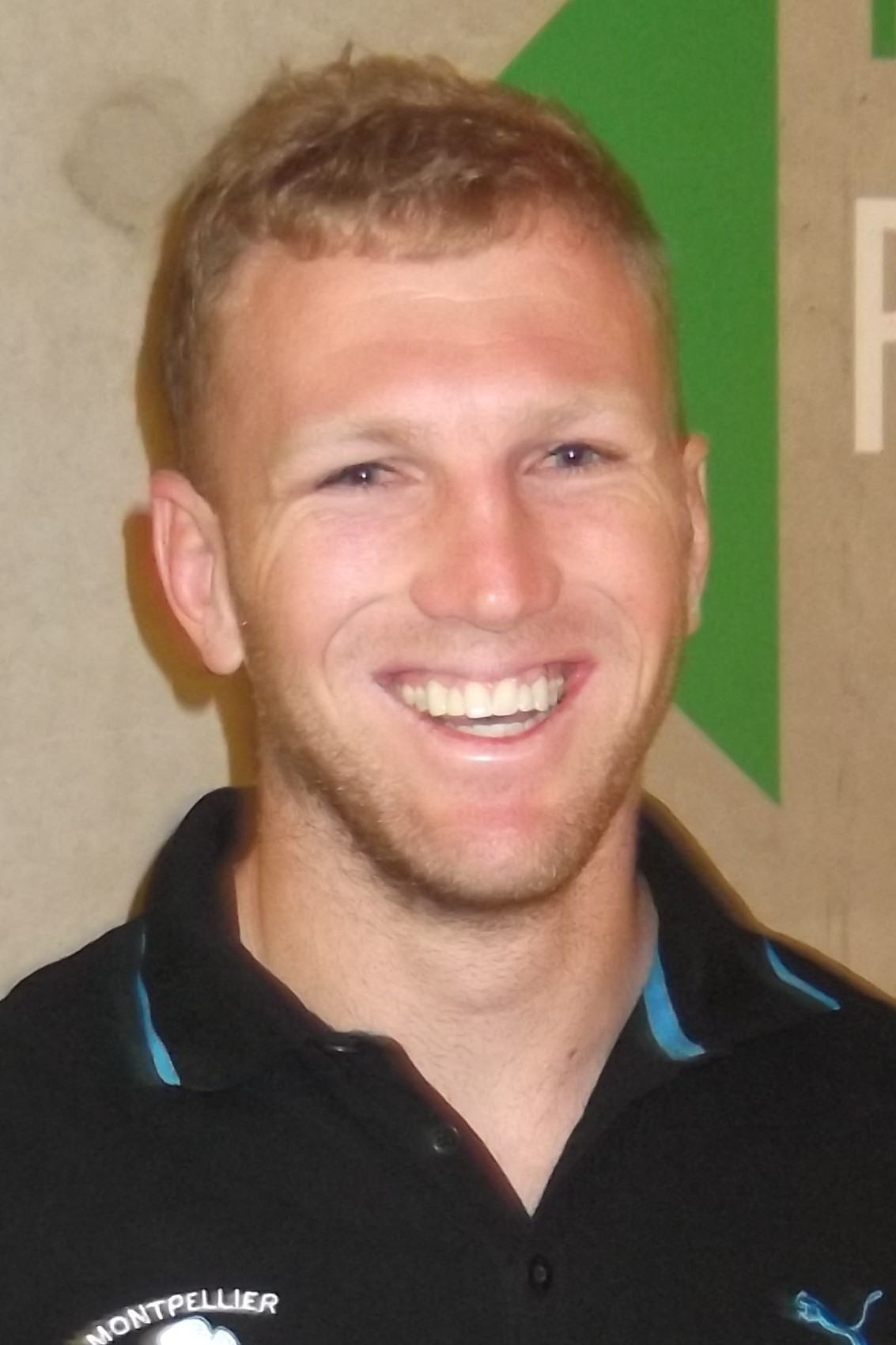
- Born: 21 June 1985 (age 41)
- Height: 1.84 m (6 ft 1/2 in)
- Weight: 95 kg (209 lb; 15.0 st)

Rugby union career
- Position: Stand off / Inside Centre
Senior career
Years	Team	Apps	(Points)
2011–13	NTT DoCoMo Red Hurricanes Osaka	20	(135)
2013–14	Montpellier Hérault RC	9	(5)
2014–15	Stade La Rochelle	32	(12)
2015–17?	Mitsubishi Sagamihara DynaBoars	1	
Provincial / State sides
Years	Team	Apps	(Points)
2006–09	Canterbury	23	(69)
Super Rugby
Years	Team	Apps	(Points)
2008–09	Crusaders	9	(11)

Hamish Gard (born 21 June 1985) is a New Zealand rugby union player. He played as a centre.

== Career ==
Gard attended Palmerston North Boys' High School. In 2003 Gard made the Hurricanes Secondary Schools Team. He played for the Crusaders in the Super Rugby competition between 2008 and 2009, after 3 years for the Canterbury provincial team.

He played for Montpellier in the French league Top 14 from February 2013 to December 2013; and returned for the 2014 season. Before and after he played for La Rochelle in December 2013, then La Rochelle for 2014, before finally returning a third time in 2014–2015; and played until 2015 when he signed for the Mitsubishi Sagamihara DynaBoars (Japan) until 2017.

Following his professional rugby career, Hamish accepted an offer to join Xigo as both a Project Manager in the construction industry and also a midfielder in the Div 3, 7 aside football team, The Xigoals. Hamish rewarded the investment early in his stint at Xigo netting 10 goals on the way to securing the Div 3 Championship and also the Golden Boot.
