= Aaron Bancroft (rugby union) =

- Born: 1 January 1985 (age 41) Blenheim, New Zealand
- Height: 1.80 m (5 ft 11 in)
- Weight: 82 kg (12 st 13 lb)
- Occupation: Property manager

Rugby union career
- Position(s): Centre; Wing
Senior career
Years	Team	Apps	(Points)
2012–13	Grenoble	8	(0)
2013–15	Carcassonne	35	(15)
- Correct as of 2 July 2016
Provincial / State sides
Years	Team	Apps	(Points)
2006	Canterbury	1	(0)
2007–09	Otago	18	(5)
2010–11	Northland	19	(25)
Super Rugby
Years	Team	Apps	(Points)
2007–08	Highlanders	13	(33)
2011	Blues	0	(0)

Aaron Bancroft (born 1 January 1985) is a former New Zealand rugby union player. He generally played as a centre but could also cover the wing position.

Bancroft last played for US Carcassonne in the Pro D2 after earlier being with Grenoble.

He formerly notably played for Northland in the National Provincial Championship and also the Crusaders and Highlanders in the Super 14.

== Rugby career ==
Bancroft transferred to Otago from Canterbury after one game in the Air New Zealand Cup in 2006. He then played for the Highlanders, impressing in his midfield role for both Otago and the Highlanders in 2007.

For the 2009 Super 14 season, Bancroft was part of the Highlanders' Wider Training Group, although not the main squad.

Bancroft signed a deal to play for Northland in the 2010 and 2011 ITM Cup which saw him line up alongside the likes of All Black Rene Ranger, Jared Payne and Bronson Murray. He was then included in the Blues Wider Training Group for the 2011 Super Rugby season.

In 2012 Bancroft signed a deal with FC Grenoble. In 2013 Bancroft signed a 2-year deal with US Carcassonne.

He is also a former New Zealand Under 21 international.
