= Beau Robinson =

Australian rugby union player

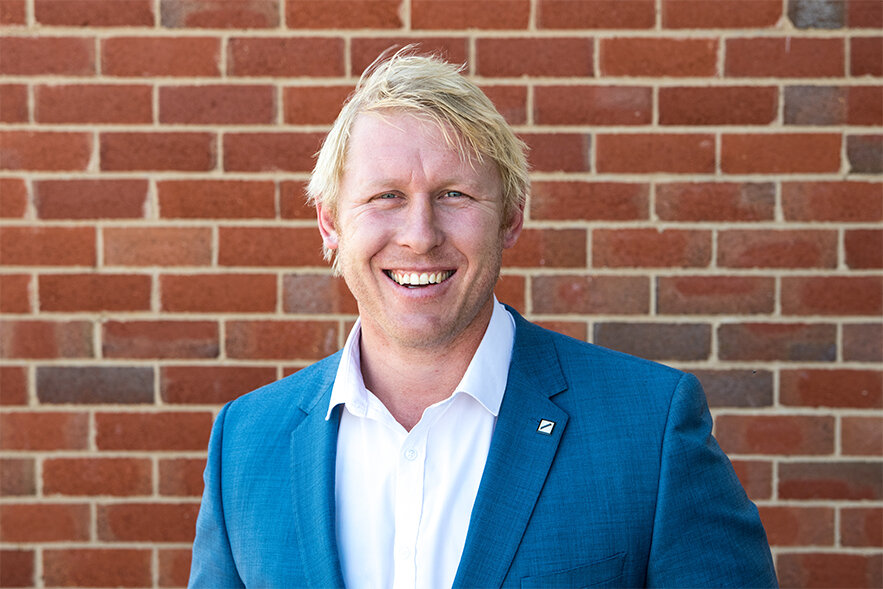

Personal information
- Born: Beau Stanley Robinson; 15 August 1986 (age 40) Alice Springs, Northern Territory, Australia
- Height: 1.82 m (5 ft 11 1/2 in)
- Weight: 97 kg (15 st 4 lb)

Playing information
Club
| Years | Team | Pld | T | G | FG | P |
|---|---|---|---|---|---|---|
| 2004 | Australian School Boys |
| 2005 | Canterbury Bulldogs |
| | Total | 0 | 0 | 0 | 0 | 0 |

Rugby union career
- Position: Flanker
Amateur team(s)
| Years | Team | Apps | (Points) |
| – | Northern Suburbs | | |
| – | Warringah | | |
| – | Souths | | |
Provincial / State sides
| Years | Team | Apps | (Points) |
| 2007 | Central Coast Rays | 10 | (25) |
| 2013 | Bay of Plenty | 9 | (5) |
| 2014 | Queensland Country | 5 | (5) |
| 2015 | New South Wales Country Eagles | 4 | (0) |
| 2016 | Harlequins | 1 | (0) |
| 2016-17 | Doncaster Knights | 8 | (0) |
- Correct as of 25 September 2016
Super Rugby
| Years | Team | Apps | (Points) |
| 2007–09 | Waratahs | 21 | (5) |
| 2011–2015 | Reds | 56 | (5) |
- Correct as of 14 June 2015
International career
| Years | Team | Apps | (Points) |
| 2011 | Australia | 1 | (0) |
- Correct as of 17 July 2011

Beau Robinson (born 15 August 1986) is a former Australian rugby union player, now Leadership & Culture Coach. Robinson played for the NSW Waratahs and Queensland Reds in the Super Rugby, and represented Australia making his senior debut in 2011. Robinson was a Flanker however was able to cover multiple positions in the forwards.

== Early life ==
Robinson grew up on some of Australia’s largest cattle stations in the Northern Territory and New South Wales. He was selected in the Australian School Boys side, in 2004.

== Rugby League ==
Robinson's professional career started with the Canterbury Bulldogs in the NRL playing in the Jersey Flegg Competition. Despite never seeing Robinson play, Mark Hughes, then Bulldogs' head of recruitment was told to move quickly on signing the Australian Schoolboy and St Stanislaus star.

== Rugby Union ==
Robinson made his NSW debut against the Brumbies in the 2006 Australian Provincial Championships.

=== Waratahs 2007-09 ===
Robinson then went on to make his Super 14 debut for the NSW Waratahs against the Sharks in front of approximately 35,000 in Durban on 9 February 2007.

In his debut season, he played 9 games, starting 5 times and scoring 1 try.

In 2008, Robinson was part of the NSW Waratahs Super 14 Final team against the Crusaders who were too strong finishing 20–12 in Christchurch.

After being inexplicably released by the Waratahs, and without a Super 14 contract in 2010, Robinson signed an 8-month contract with Italian 3rd tier side, Benevento Gladiators club.

The hope would be that when the new franchise, Melbourne Rebels was introduced into the new Super Rugby competition in 2011, Robinson would have an opportunity to come back and show his worth, with the new franchise in the competition.

=== Benevento Gladiators 2010 ===
Although signing with the Italian side, Robinson was provided an early release on compassionate grounds after his brother Dan Robinson died suddenly in January, 2010.

=== Reds 2011-15 ===
Robinson after coming back from Italy, and without a club in 2011 initiated contact with his former coach, Ewen McKenzie who was then coach of the Reds.

Ewen said there might be an opportunity. They'd filled up all their contracts and couldn't even offer an academy contract. However he was encouraged to come up, play club footy and to train full-time with the squad. For all his hard work and effort, he was awarded a 2-year contract.

In his debut season for the Reds, he won the Super Rugby Championship. Unlike his first experience of a Super Rugby Final in 2008, as an unused sub, he was an integral part of the team that won the Super Rugby Final 18–13 against the Crusaders at Suncorp Stadium in front of 52,000. And with that, it earnt his senior call up to the Wallabies.

In 2012 & 2013 Robinson and the Reds made it to both qualifiers, however were knocked out respectively by the Sharks and Crusaders.

Robinson faced the British & Irish Lions in front of a packed, 50,000 Suncorp Stadium.

=== Harlequins F.C. 2016 ===
Robinson was signed with the Harlequins to act as cover for the injured Netani Talei who had picked up an injury from the 2015 Rugby World Cup.

=== Doncaster Knights 2016-17 ===
Robinson signed a 1-year contract with Doncaster Knights.

== Post Rugby, Studies & Leadership & Culture Coach ==
During his career, Robinson was always conscious of life after Rugby. Two questions he would ask himself, "What will I do at the end of my Rugby career?” and “What would I do if my Rugby career finished tomorrow?” This is where Robinson completed his bachelor's degree in Business from Griffith University and became a certified Action Business Coach.

Robinson's passion is helping business owners and teams through his experience, skills and knowledge playing at an elite level.

Robinson has taken up the first team coach and Director of Rugby at Dubbo Rugby Club.

== Personal life ==
During a stint playing Italian club rugby in 2010, Robinson's younger brother Dan was tragically electrocuted while crossing a train line during a holiday with his sibling in London.

A talented sports athlete himself, Dan joined Robinson at St Stanislaus College as a Year 10 student. That same year the pair travelled with 'Stannies' to Japan for a rugby tournament in which Robinson was in Year 12 and captain, while Dan was the youngest player. Dan, following in his other brother's footsteps, represented Australia in the under-19s.

Robinson, while living in Sydney during his time with the Waratahs had shared a flat with Dan and spent a lot of time together as best mates. Robinson has a tattoo over his heart in memory of his brother, Dan.

While in Europe, Robinson was told by his brother Dan that he 'is a (expletive) idiot if you don't go back and have a crack'.
