= Fetuʻu Vainikolo =

Tonga international rugby union player

Fetu’u Vainikolo
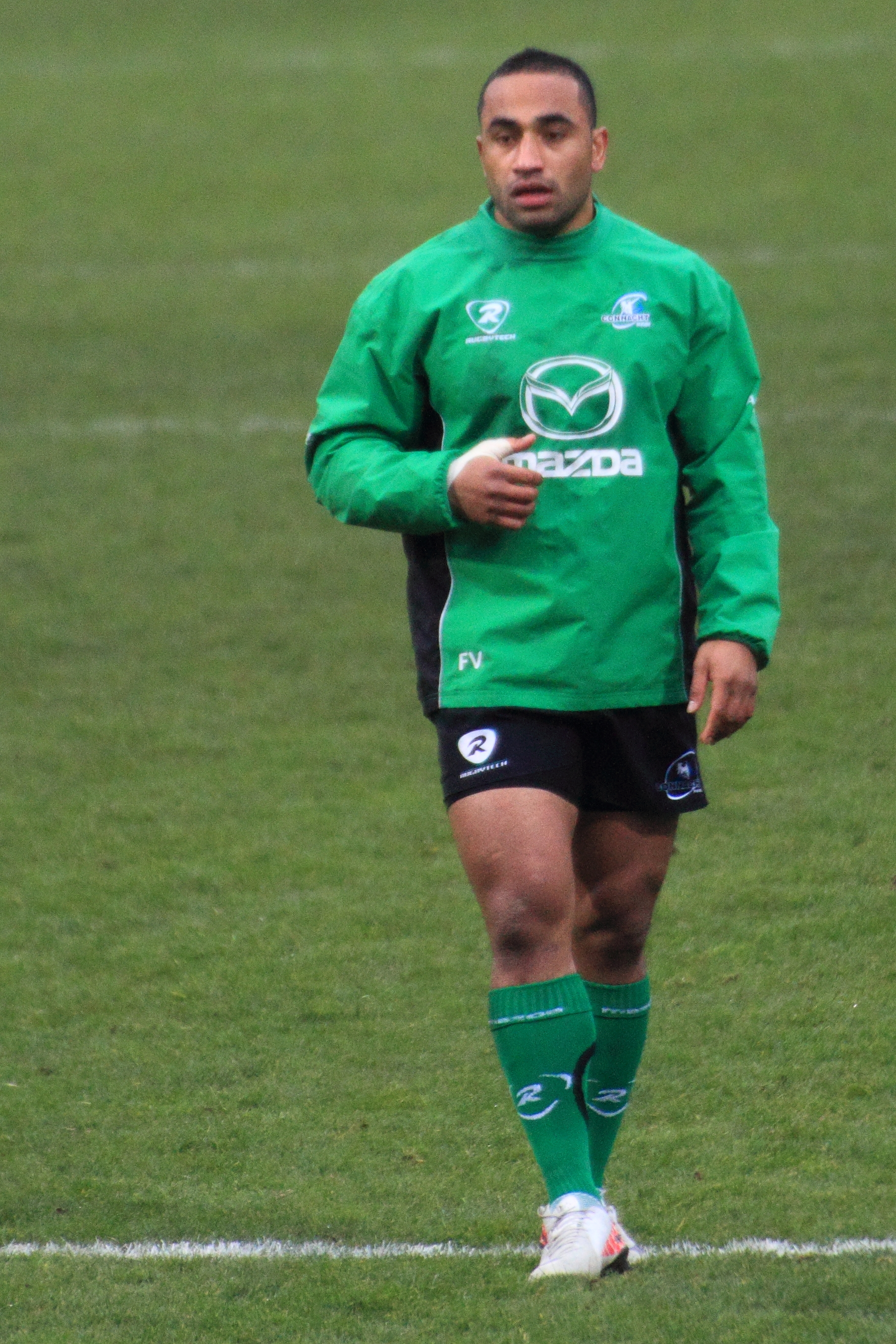
- Vainikolo in 2012
- Born: Fetu'u Moana Vainikolo; 30 January 1985 (age 41) Tofoa, Tonga
- Height: 1.82 m (6 ft 0 in)
- Weight: 95 kg (14 st 13 lb; 209 lb)

Rugby union career
- Position: Wing
Senior career
| Years | Team | Apps | (Points) |
| 2013–15 | Exeter Chiefs | 29 | (50) |
| 2015–17 | Oyonnax | - | (-) |
| 2017–18 | Valence Romans | - | (-) |
| 2018–20 | Utah Warriors | - | (-) |
- Correct as of 12 July 2025
Provincial / State sides
| Years | Team | Apps | (Points) |
| 2007–2008 | Northland | 19 | (50) |
| 2009–2010 | Otago | 13 | (5) |
| 2011–2013 | Connacht | 37 | (35) |
- Correct as of 12 July 2025
Super Rugby
| Years | Team | Apps | (Points) |
| 2008–2010 | Highlanders | 41 | (65) |
International career
| Years | Team | Apps | (Points) |
| 2011–16 | Tonga | 28 | (90) |
- Correct as of 12 July 2025

Fetu'u Moana Vainikolo (born 30 January 1985) is a Tongan former rugby union player. His regular playing position was Wing.

== Early life ==
Born in Tonga, Vainikolo's family moved to New Zealand in 1997 when he was 12. He moved through rugby age group levels in Auckland before moving to the Wellsford club in Northland in 2007.

== Club career ==
=== New Zealand ===
Vainikolo made his debut in the 2007 Air New Zealand Cup, scoring five tries in just 10 matches to earn himself a Super Rugby contract. He repeated the feat with another five tries in 2008. Vainikolo transferred to Otago to join many of his Highlanders teammates for the 2009 Air New Zealand Cup. However, he was unable to duplicate his success for Northland, missing much of 2009 through injury and then struggling with poor form throughout the 2010 ITM Cup.

On the heels of his success with Northland, Vainikolo was drafted into the Highlanders squad for the 2008 Super 14 season. While the team endured a difficult campaign, Vainikolo stood out as an offensive weapon, finishing third in the competition with six tries, including several of the highlight-reel variety. In the 2009 Super 14 season, Vainikolo struggled to repeat his first-year success, scoring only two tries and facing increased criticism for his defensive play, splitting starts with the more reliable Kendrick Lynn. In 2010, he started the season sharing playing time with James Paterson, but started the last seven games of the year and finished with five tries to co-lead the club along with Israel Dagg. Concerns about his all-around game and poor form during the 2010 ITM Cup saw Vainikolo left off the Highlanders main squad for the 2011 Super 15 season, although he was included in the team's wider training group.

=== Europe ===
On the conclusion of Tonga's participation at the 2011 Rugby World Cup, Vainikolo joined the Irish province Connacht for the 2011–2012 season. Having missed the pre-season and the first two months of the RaboDirectPro12 season, Vainikolo struggled to establish himself in the starting XV. Gradually, as he has settled and his performances improved as his confidence grew, he established himself as a key component in the Connacht attack. He is most notable for his eagerness to get involved, frequently coming infield to make a key tackle or to help clear out a ruck. After 14 Connacht appearances in 2011–12 between Pro12 & Heineken Cup and 3 league tries, season 2012–13 held much promise for the fan favourite Tongan. He scored a vital try against Irish Rivals Leinster Rugby, in a Pro12 derby to help Connacht gain a 34–6 win over the European champions. Vainikolo ran 50 metres to score a crucial try as Connacht beat French giants Biarritz in the Heineken Cup. He started in all six of Connacht's Heineken Cup games, and featured in seventeen of Connacht's twenty two Pro12 games.

Exeter Chiefs announced on their official website on 9 May 2013 that Vainikolo would be joining the Chiefs on a two-year deal. Vainikolo scored a try on his competitive debut for the Chiefs during a 44–29 victory over Cardiff Blues in the Heineken Cup.

After his stint with the Chiefs, Vanikolo signed with Top 14 side Oyonnax.

== International career ==
Vainikolo was selected in the Tonga 2011 World Cup squad on 8 August, and made his test debut on 13 August 2011 against Fiji in a 27–12 loss. His second appearance came one week later with a starting place in Tonga's 32–20 win against Fiji at Churchill Park, Lautoka in which he scored his first try for Tonga.

At RWC 2011, his first World Cup outing was a starting place in Tonga's 25–20 loss to Canada, his second appearance came against Japan in which he scored Tonga's third try in a 31–18 group match win.

Fetu'u was called into the Tongan 2012 IRB Pacific Nations Cup squad, which was being hosted by Japan and Fiji in June 2012. He scored two tries in the first match of the 2013 IRB Pacific Nations Cup, in which Tonga beat Japan 27–17 on 25 May 2013.

Vainikolo is currently the top try scorer for the Tongan national team.
