= Kurtis Haiu =

New Zealand rugby union player

- Born: Kurtis Taniela Haiu; 14 July 1984 Whangārei, New Zealand
- Died: 13 April 2016 (aged 31) Manurewa, New Zealand
- Height: 1.96 m (6 ft 5 in)
- Weight: 108 kg (238 lb)
- School: Sacred Heart College

Rugby union career
- Position: Lock
Provincial / State sides
| Years | Team | Apps | (Points) |
| 2005–10 | Auckland | 62 | (40) |
- Correct as of 24 December 2009
Super Rugby
| Years | Team | Apps | (Points) |
| 2006, 2008–11 | Blues | 53 | (25) |
- Correct as of 27 February 2010
- Correct as of 24 December 2009

Kurtis Taniela Haiu (14 July 1984 – 13 April 2016) was a New Zealand rugby union player who played for Blues in Super Rugby and represented Auckland in the Air New Zealand Cup.

== Career ==
=== Representative rugby ===
Haiu represented New Zealand at Secondary Schools, under 19 and under 21 level before beginning his professional rugby career.

=== ITM Cup ===
Haiu made his debut for Auckland in 2005 against the touring British and Irish Lions, a game Auckland lost 13–17. He has continued to represent Auckland, and was given captaincy duties on occasion.

=== Super Rugby ===
2006 saw Haiu make his Super 14 debut off the bench for the Blues in their season opening 19–37 loss to the Hurricanes at Eden Park. His first start for the Blues came in the Round 7 loss to the New South Wales Waratahs where he was given the task of marking Wycliff Palu. That same season Haiu scored his first try in Super Rugby when he dotted down against the Cats at Ellis Park. He made 53 appearances until his retirement from the game in 2011.

== Sarcoma ==
2011 saw Haiu take an indefinite leave from rugby after the discovery of a lesion on a rib. Located in his T8 rib, the lesion was found by CT imaging taken in mid April. Haiu had noticed rib pain for several months but attributed this to the contact involved in rugby. However the pain became more frequent needing the initiation of further tests, including bone tests, with the diagnosis being a rare form of bone cancer called Ewing's sarcoma.

Haiu died from Ewing's sarcoma in Manurewa on 13 April 2016.
