= Rob Horne =

Australia international rugby union player

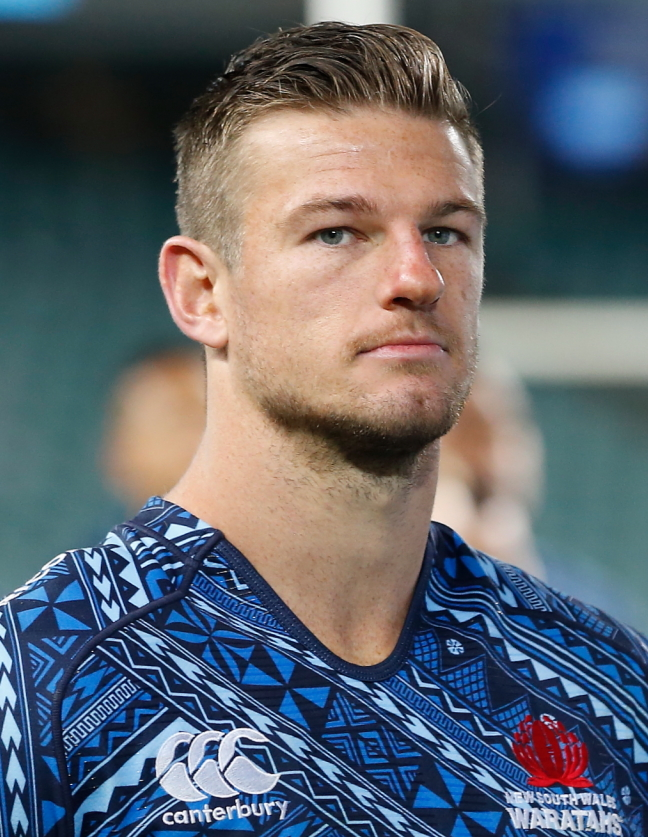
- Horne in 2017
- Born: Robert Horne; 15 August 1989 (age 37) Sydney, New South Wales, Australia
- Height: 186 cm (6 ft 1 in)
- Weight: 92 kg (14 st 7 lb)
- School: Lugarno Public School; Georges River College, Oatley
- University: Charles Sturt University (MCom)

Rugby union career
- Position(s): Centre, Wing
Youth career
- Oatley
Amateur team(s)
Years	Team	Apps	(Points)
2013	Southern Districts	5	(10)
- Correct as of 7 September 2013
Senior career
Years	Team	Apps	(Points)
2014	Greater Sydney Rams	0	(0)
2017–2018	Northampton Saints	21	(40)
- Correct as of 14 April 2018
Super Rugby
Years	Team	Apps	(Points)
2008–2017	New South Wales	114	(145)
- Correct as of 15 July 2017
International career
Years	Team	Apps	(Points)
2007	Australia Schoolboys		
2008–2009	Australia U20	5	(5)
2010–2017	Australia	34	(20)
- Correct as of 24 June 2017
National sevens team
Years	Team		Comps
2008	Australia		
Medal record
Men's rugby union
Representing Australia
Rugby World Cup
Silver medal – second place	2015 England	Squad
Bronze medal – third place	2011 New Zealand	Squad

Rob Horne (born 15 August 1989) is an Australian former rugby union footballer who played at centre for the Waratahs, Northampton Saints, and Australia.

== Early life ==
Horne attended Lugarno Public School and Georges River College, Oatley Campus. He played club rugby as a junior with Oatley rugby club.

== Club career ==
=== Super Rugby ===
Rob Horne made his Super Rugby debut for the Waratahs in 2008 at the age of 18, he came off the bench for Timana Tahu against the Blues. He quickly cemented his place in the team, starting in the 2008 Super 14 Final in which Waratahs lost to Crusaders 20–12.

=== Premiership Rugby ===
It was announced on 6 February 2017, that Horne would join English side Northampton Saints for the beginning of the 2017–18 season.

==== Retirement ====
After making a big impact in his first season at Northampton Saints Horne was made captain for the first time during the local derby with Leicester Tigers on 14 April 2018. Thirteen seconds into the game, he was injured after tackling Sione Kalamafoni. Medics attended to him for some time on the field before transporting him to Leicester Royal Infirmary. Northampton went on to win the game 21–27. One week later on 21 April 2018 it was announced that Horne had been forced to retire from professional rugby immediately due to injury. After receiving care at the Royal National Orthopaedic Hospital it was confirmed that he had sustained significant, career ending nerve damage to his right arm. He later confirmed in an interview that this damage was to the Brachial Plexus nerves in his right shoulder. This left him with full paralysis of his right arm.

== International career ==
Horne was named as vice-captain for the Wallabies in 2016 alongside Michael Hooper, but was ruled out of game-time for the rest of the year after suffering from a leg injury against New Zealand in Sydney during the opening match of the Bledisloe series.
