= Morgan Turinui =

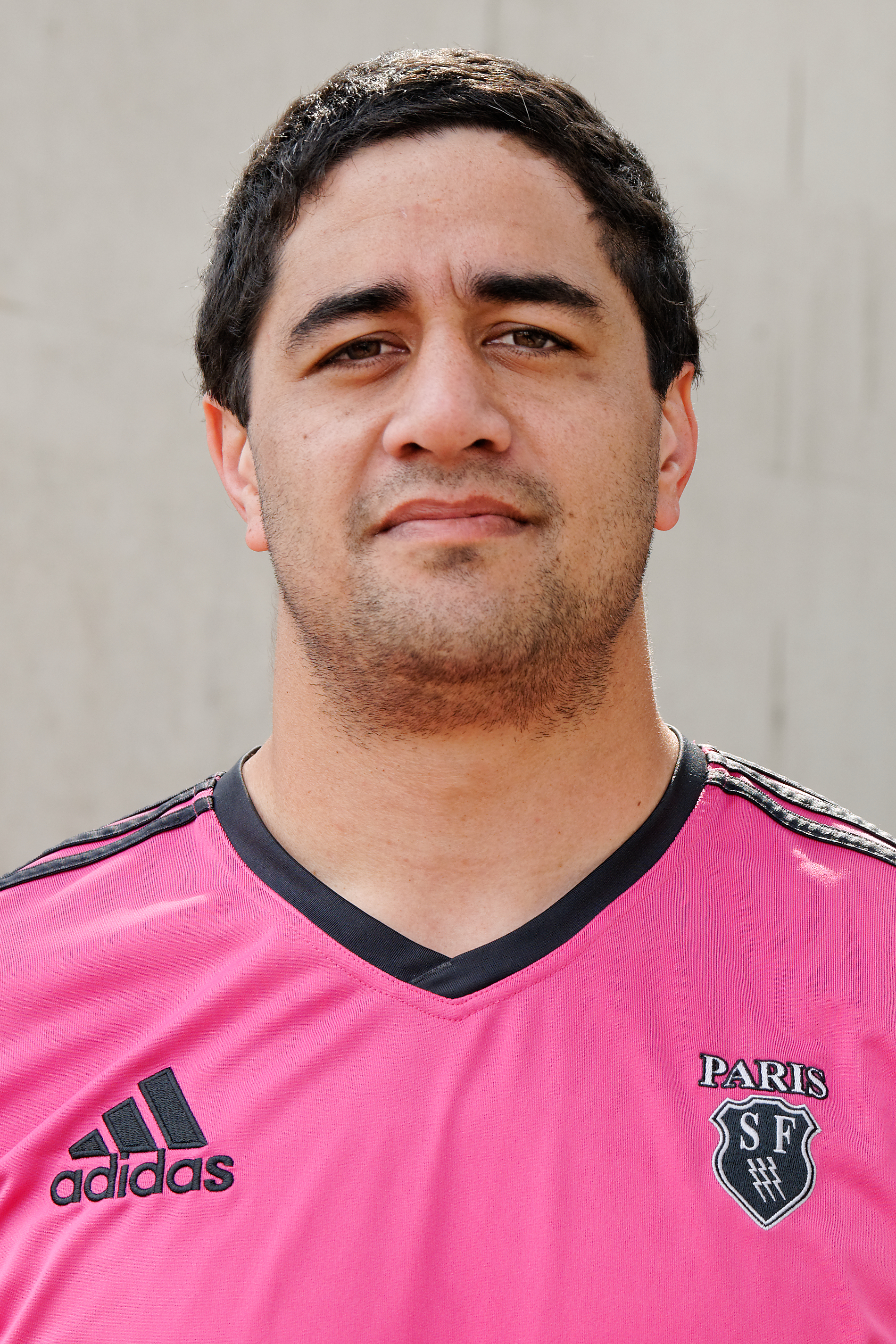
- Born: Morgan Turinui; 5 January 1982 (age 44) Sydney, Australia
- Height: 1.81 m (5 ft 11 1/2 in)
- Weight: 101 kg (15 st 13 lb)
- School: Waverley College

Rugby union career
- Position: Centre
- Current team: Retired
Youth career
- Randwick
Senior career
| Years | Team | Apps | (Points) |
| 2011– 2012 | Stade Français | | |
Provincial / State sides
| Years | Team | Apps | (Points) |
- Randwick DRUFC
| - | Sunshine Coast Stingrays | | |
Super Rugby
| Years | Team | Apps | (Points) |
| 2003-07 | Waratahs | 65 | (125) |
| 2008-10 | Reds | 11 | (5) |
International career
| Years | Team | Apps | (Points) |
| 2003–05 | Australia | 20 | (30) |
| 2006 | Australia A | 3 | |
| 2000 | Schoolboys | | |
| 2002 | Australia U-21 | | |
National sevens team
| Years | Team | | Comps |
- Australia 7s

Morgan Turinui (born 5 January 1982 in Sydney) is an Australian former professional rugby union footballer who is currently a rugby commentator for Stan Sport and Channel Nine in Australia.

== Early life ==
Turinui was educated at the Sydney school of Waverley College. In 2000, Turinui captained the Australia Schoolboys, having been the vice-captain of the side in the previous year. Turinui went on to represent the Australia under-21 team in 2002 and play for the Australian Sevens side in Hong Kong and Beijing.

== Professional career ==
Turinui came of age in 2003, scoring a record six tries for his club side, Randwick DRUFC against Warringah Rugby Club. This effort helped him to be selected for his provincial team, the New South Wales Waratahs, in the same year. In his first year as a professional player, he made his debut for the national team against Ireland and was selected for the Wallabies campaign for the 2003 Rugby Union World Cup.

Although he did not feature prominently in the 2003 tournament, he went on to become a regular fixture in the national team. Turinui was named vice-captain of the Wallabies for their Bledisloe Cup Test against the All Blacks in September 2005 and played in all 13 of the Wallabies' Tests in that year. In June 2007, Turinui signed with the Queensland Reds for the 2008 Super 14 season.

Since retiring from rugby, Turinui now commentates on Stan Sport, alongside Andrew Mehrtens, and Justin Harrison.
