= Wyatt Crockett =

New Zealand rugby player (born 1983)

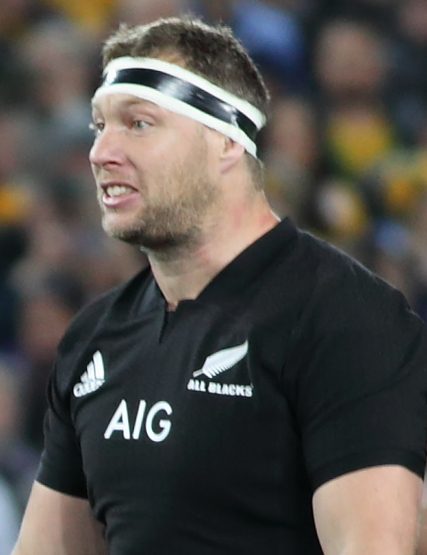
- Born: Wyatt William Vogels Crockett; 24 January 1983 (age 43) Christchurch, New Zealand
- Height: 1.93 m (6 ft 4 in)
- Weight: 116 kg (18 st 4 lb; 256 lb)
- School: Nelson College; Otago Boys' High School

Rugby union career
- Position: Loosehead prop
Senior career
Years	Team	Apps	(Points)
2005–2017	Canterbury	73	(30)
2018–2019	Tasman	20	(15)
2019	Panasonic Wild Knights	4	(0)
- Correct as of 27 October 2019
Super Rugby
Years	Team	Apps	(Points)
2006–2018	Crusaders	202	(55)
- Correct as of 30 September 2018
International career
Years	Team	Apps	(Points)
2006–2007	Junior All Blacks	6	(5)
2009–2017	New Zealand	71	(10)
- Correct as of 23 September 2018

Wyatt William Vogels Crockett (born 24 January 1983) is a former New Zealand rugby union player. He played at prop for the Crusaders in Super Rugby, Canterbury and Tasman in the National Provincial Championship, and the New Zealand national team, the All Blacks. Crockett has played in 202 Super Rugby fixtures and is the second most-capped Super Rugby player of all time.

Crockett attended Nelson College from 1994 to 2000, and Otago Boys High School in 2001.

== Career ==
=== Early career ===
Crockett made his Super Rugby debut in 2006, quickly becoming a regular starter for the Crusaders, starting for the Crusaders in the 2006 and 2008 Grand Final-winning games against the Hurricanes and Waratahs respectively.

He made his All Blacks debut in a win against Italy on 27 June 2009, starting over the world-class Tony Woodcock. Crockett also started three times for New Zealand on the 2009 end-of-year tour, but was not selected in 2010 due to injury.

In 2011 he was selected in the All Blacks Tri-Nations Squad as injury cover and started against South Africa and Australia, following a start against Fiji prior to the Tri-Nations. Crockett was not subbed off against South Africa and also scored his first try for the All Blacks in the 40–7 win, a rare feat for a front-rower, however he narrowly missed selection to the victorious New Zealand squad for the 2011 Rugby World Cup.

=== 2012-2016 ===
Crockett was re-selected for New Zealand in 2012 as injury cover, cementing a place as a regular off the bench after starting against Australia and Scotland. Crockett played in every single test of 2013 except for one, making five starts and eight appearances as a replacement for Woodcock off the bench.

In 2014, First choice prop Tony Woodcock was injured in the All Blacks third test against England, Crockett played nearly all the rest of the games on tour for the All Blacks and started eight times in 2014.

Crockett was selected for the 2015 Rugby World Cup, where New Zealand retained the Webb Ellis Cup. He notably started in the quarter-final against France which was a 62–13 win to New Zealand. Crockett was injured in that game however, ending his World Cup campaign. This saw Crockett lose his chance for a place in the All Blacks as a starter to Joe Moody, who was called up as a replacement for the World Cup, succeeding Crockett as a starter in 2016. Crockett would replace Moody off the bench eleven times in 2016, including in his 50th test in a 29–9 win against Australia after starting the week before due to Moody being injured. Crockett also started in the 68–10 win against Italy on 12 November, scoring his second try for the All Blacks in a 70-minute game that day.

Crockett became the most-capped Super Rugby player in history on 14 April 2017, starting for the Crusaders in a 50–3 win against the Sunwolves. Crockett's record-breaking 176th game for the franchise saw him overtake the record of now-retired long-serving Blues veteran and former All Blacks teammate Keven Mealamu, who played his 175 Super Rugby fixtures over a career spanning from 2000 to 2015. Crockett replaced Moody off the bench in all of the knockout rounds for the 2017 Super Rugby season, including the 25-17 winning Grand Final against the Lions on 5 August. This was Crockett's third title win with the Crusaders, who have now won eight as a team. Crockett and Kieran Read were the only players from 2017's title-winning squad to play in their previous title-winning final from 2008.

=== 2017-2018 ===
Crockett currently holds the world record of consecutive Test wins - 45. Crockett's 45th consecutive win as an individual was in the first test against the British and Irish Lions on 24 June, with a final score of 30–15. Crockett's record run was ended when the All Blacks were beaten 24–21 by the British and Irish Lions at Westpac stadium on 1 July 2017.

Crockett only played 14 minutes against the Wallabies on 19 August 2017 in Sydney following a serious concussion, but returned two weeks later against Argentina and followed up the next week to produce a world-class appearance replacing new regular starter Kane Hames off the bench against South Africa, with the All Blacks winning 57–0 with Crockett one of the standout players in the test. Crockett played another two great tests against Argentina and South Africa in round 4 and 5 of the 2017 Rugby Championship, replicating Hames' excellent form. Crockett's world-class form dipped on the end-of-year tour however, as he gave away many penalties including a yellow card for the last nine minutes in a 22–17 win against Scotland.

Crockett made his final appearance in a black jersey on 25 November 2017 in a 33–18 win over Wales, replacing Kane Hames in the 60th minute.

On 27 February 2018, Crockett announced on social media that he would not re-sign for the Crusaders and All Blacks and would retire from international rugby with immediate effect, with the 2018 Super Rugby season to be his last Super Rugby campaign.
