= Mark Lawrence (rugby union) =

- Born: June 16, 1965 (age 61) Standerton
- Height: 186
- Weight: 87
- School: Highbury Primary School; Beachwood High School
- University: Technikon Witwatersrand

Rugby union career
Refereeing career
Years	Competition	Apps
2003 & 2007	Rugby World Cup	
2000–2011	Test Matches	
2000–2013	Super Rugby	
1995–2013	Currie Cup	

Mark Lawrence (born 16 June 1965, Standerton) is an international rugby union referee from South Africa. He refereed his first international test match, in 2000, and was chosen to officiate at both the 2003 Rugby World Cup and 2007 Rugby World Cup acting as a touch judge and a TMO in both competitions. He refereed the 2007 Currie Cup Final between the Free State Cheetahs and the Golden Lions. He also refereed the 2008 Super 14 Final between the Crusaders and the Waratahs.

In September 2011, he announced his retirement from test rugby to concentrate on coaching emerging referees.
