= Akona Ndungane =

South African rugby union player

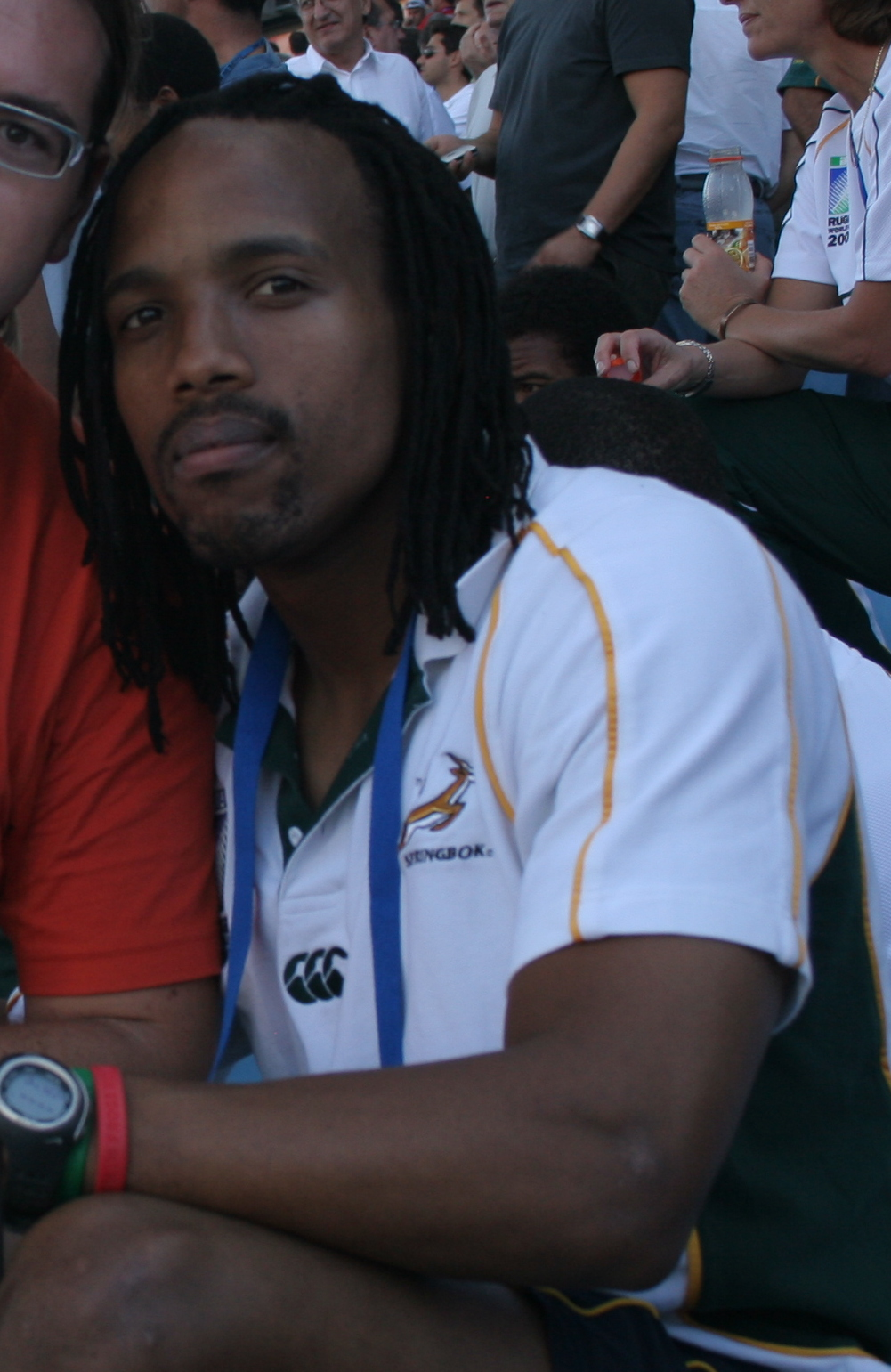
- Ndungane in 2007
- Full name: Akona Zilindlovu Ndungane
- Born: 20 February 1981 (age 45) Mthatha, South Africa
- Height: 1.83 m (6 ft 0 in)
- Weight: 93 kg (14 st 9 lb; 205 lb)
- School: Hudson Park High School, East London
- University: Eastern Cape Technikon
- Notable relative: Odwa Ndungane (brother)

Rugby union career
- Position: Wing
Youth career
- 1999: Border Bulldogs
- 2002: Mighty Elephants
Senior career
| Years | Team | Apps | (Points) |
| 2003 | Mighty Elephants | 13 | (30) |
| 2004–2005 | Border Bulldogs | 17 | (70) |
| 2005–2015 | Blue Bulls | 75 | (150) |
| 2006–2015 | Bulls | 108 | (165) |
| 2003–2015 | Total | 213 | (415) |
- Correct as of 24 May 2015
International career
| Years | Team | Apps | (Points) |
| 2004 | South Africa Sevens | | |
| 2004 | South Africa 'A' | 1 | (15) |
| 2006–2007 | South Africa (test) | 11 | (5) |
| 2007 | South Africa (tour) | 2 | (0) |
- Correct as of 24 May 2015
Medal record
Men's Rugby union
Representing South Africa
Rugby World Cup
| Gold medal – first place | 2007 France | Squad |

Akona Zilindlovu Ndungane (born 20 February 1981) is a former South African professional rugby union player whose usual position was on the wing, although he also played as the centre.

He started his career in the Eastern Cape, playing for the Mighty Elephants in 2003 and for the Border Bulldogs in 2004 and 2005, before he was loaned out to the Blue Bulls for two seasons and eventually bought outright by the Pretoria-based side. However, he spent the bulk of his career in Pretoria, where he played for the Bulls in the international Super Rugby competition as well as the Blue Bulls in the Currie Cup and Vodacom Cup competition. In 2005, he made his Super 12 debut for the Bulls against the Cats.

In 2004, he was included in the South Africa Sevens side that competed at the IRB Sevens World Series in Bordeaux and London. He also represented the Springboks in 2006 and 2007, and was part of the victorious 2007 Rugby World Cup squad.

He announced his retirement at the conclusion of the 2015 Super Rugby season, having made in excess of hundred appearances for the Bulls in Super Rugby and a similar amount in domestic rugby with the Blue Bulls, Border Bulldogs and Mighty Elephants.

He is the twin brother of winger Odwa Ndungane, who spent most of his career in Durban with the Sharks.
