= Mark Gerrard =

Former Australian rugby union player/current coach

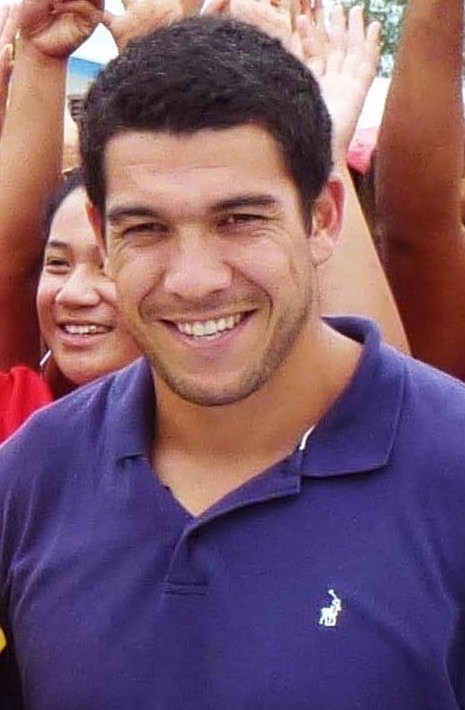
- Mark Gerrard in Tonga 2012
- Born: 4 September 1982 (age 44) Sydney, New South Wales, Australia
- Height: 191 cm (6 ft 3 in)
- Weight: 98 kg (15 st 6 lb; 216 lb)
- School: Narrabeen Sports High, Narrabeen North Primary School
- Notable relative(s): Mo'onia Gerrard (sister); Wycliff Palu; Keta Iongi
- Occupation(s): Rugby union player Assistant coach

Rugby union career
- Position(s): Fullback, Centre, Wing, Flyhalf
Senior career
Years	Team	Apps	(Points)
2010–11	NTT Com Shining Arcs	10	(34)
2013−18	Toyota Shokki	44	(167)
- Correct as of 15 January 2017
Super Rugby
Years	Team	Apps	(Points)
2001–02	Waratahs	2	(3)
2003–09	Brumbies	78	(306)
2011–12	Rebels	27	(13)
- Correct as of 23 July 2012
International career
Years	Team	Apps	(Points)
2005–11	Australia	24	(45)
- Correct as of 16 November 2026
Coaching career
- Years: Team
- 2021–2022: Austin Gilgronis (assistant coach)
- Correct as of 30 October 2022

Mark Gerrard (born 4 September 1982) is a former Australian professional rugby union footballer. He currently is the assistant coach for the Austin Gilgronis in Major League Rugby (MLR) competition in the United States. In 2011, he was one of 10 players nominated to become the competition's Super Rugby player of the year.

Gerrard has played for the Australian Wallabies and previously played for the NSW Waratahs and the ACT Brumbies. He usually plays at fullback or wing but can also cover in the centres and sometimes flyhalf. His sister Mo'onia Gerrard is an Australian representative netballer. He is the cousin of Wallaby Wycliff Palu.

== Biography ==
Gerrard was educated at both Narrabeen North Primary School and Narrabeen Sports High School, where he started playing rugby league, representing Australian School Boys in that code before switching to Rugby Union. Gerrard made the Australian Schoolboys team in 1999.

Gerrard went on to play for the Warringah Rugby Club and represented Australia in the national under-19s side in both 2000 and 2001; also in 2001 he represented Australia in the under-21s side. After the successful appearances for junior representative sides, he made his Super 12 debut for the New South Wales Waratahs. He continued to make the under-21 Australian side up for the next two years, before touring Japan with Australia A in 2003. He signed for the ACT Brumbies for the 2003 season. He made his debut for the Brumbies against the Sharks at Durban, scoring a try. He played for the Brumbies in 2004, with the team winning the championship. He missed out on a mid-year test match against England in Brisbane due to injury. He was a member of the Australian squad that toured England, Scotland and France at the end of the year but did not play because of a recurring hamstring injury. In late 2005 he made his Test debut for Australia when he came on as a replacement against Italy in Melbourne.

Gerrard moved to Japan and spent one season with the NTT Communications Shining Arcs.

During the coronation of the present King of Tonga, Mark Gerrard played for Tonga during the coronation rugby match in the Teufaiva stadium.

Gerrard moved back from Japan to join the Melbourne Rebels for the start of the 2011 Super Rugby season. He played 11 of the Rebels 16 games that year. Later in 2011, Gerrard was named in the 40-man Wallabies squad.

In May 2012, Gerrard was expected to play his 100th Super Rugby game.
