= Tiʻi Paulo =

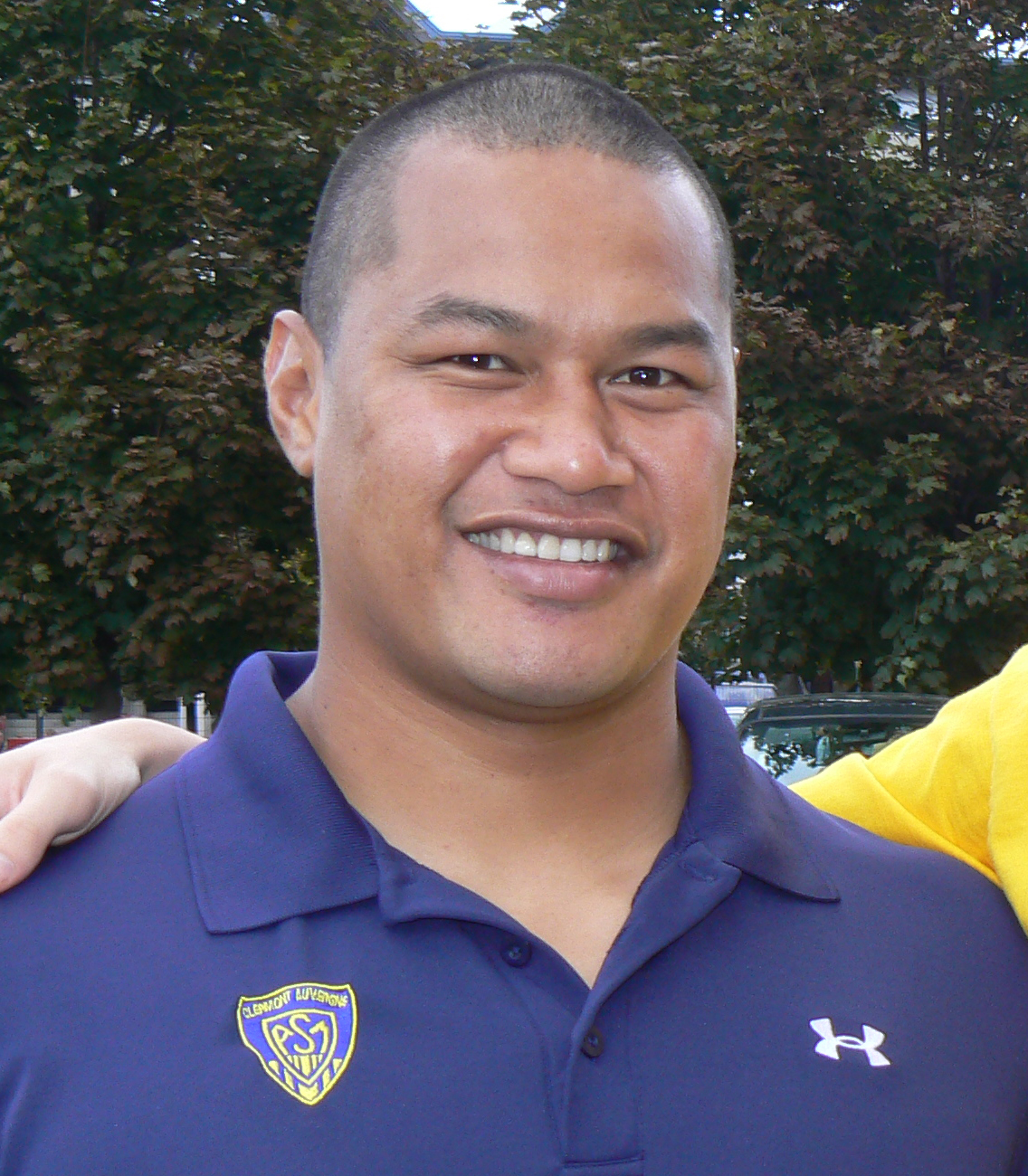
- Born: Tiʻi T. Paulo; 13 January 1983 (age 43) Christchurch, New Zealand
- Height: 1.83 m (6 ft 0 in)
- Weight: 110 kg (17 st 5 lb; 243 lb)
- School: Kavanagh College

Rugby union career
- Position: Hooker
Senior career
Years	Team	Apps	(Points)
2010–15	Clermont	126	(30)
2015–17	Lyon OU	56	(20)
- Correct as of 12 December 2019
Provincial / State sides
Years	Team	Apps	(Points)
2002–2005	Canterbury	2	(5)
2006	Tasman	9	(5)
2007–2009	Canterbury	16	(5)
2017–18	Tasman	12	(0)
- Correct as of 12 December 2019
Super Rugby
Years	Team	Apps	(Points)
2005–2010	Crusaders	32	(25)
- Correct as of 13 July 2014
International career
Years	Team	Apps	(Points)
2002	New Zealand U19		
2004	New Zealand U21		
2011–	Samoa	22	(0)
- Correct as of 26 November 2014

Tiʻi Paulo (born 13 January 1983) is a rugby union player for Clermont in the Top 14 competition. He plays as a hooker.

== Career ==
Paulo was educated at Kavanagh College, Dunedin, New Zealand. He played for the Crusaders in Super Rugby between 2005 and 2010 and has also played for the Canterbury and Tasman provincial sides. In 2010 he signed with Clermont. He is also part of Samoa's national team.
