= Andy Ellis (rugby union) =

New Zealand rugby union player

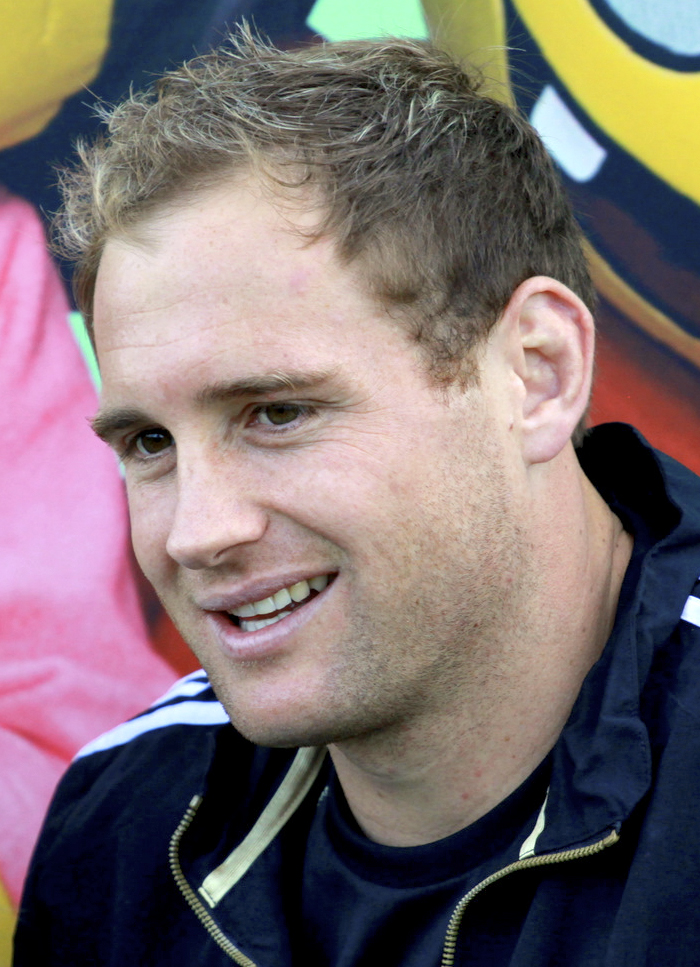
- Born: Andrew Michael Ellis; 21 February 1984 (age 42) Christchurch, Canterbury region, New Zealand
- Height: 1.76 m (5 ft 9 1/2 in)
- Weight: 89 kg (14 st 0 lb)
- School: Burnside High School
- University: Lincoln University

Rugby union career
- Position: Half-back
Senior career
Years	Team	Apps	(Points)
2005–2013	Canterbury	73	(84)
2006–2016	Crusaders	154	(144)
2014–2020	Kobe Steelers	67	(132)
2021–2022	Rugby New York	31	(45)
- Correct as of 18 March 2022
International career
Years	Team	Apps	(Points)
2005	New Zealand Colts	4	(10)
2006–2015	New Zealand	28	(20)
2007	Junior All Blacks	5	(5)
2010–2017	Barbarian F.C.	6	(20)
2015–2018	World XV	3	(10)
- Correct as of 13 January 2021
Coaching career
- Years: Team
- 2026–: Kobe Steelers

Andrew Ellis (born 21 February 1984) is a New Zealand rugby union player who plays the position of half-back.

He has played for Rugby New York in Major League Rugby (MLR), the Kobe Steelers in Japan, the Crusaders in Super Rugby, and Canterbury in provincial rugby.

== Rugby career ==
In 2005 Ellis played in the New Zealand under-21 side. His Super 14 rookie year saw him oust All Black Kevin Senio from the Crusaders starting line-up. Ellis missed the 2006 Super 14 Final after sustaining a knee injury in the semi-final against the Bulls.

Although injury meant Ellis was unavailable for the 2006 All Blacks tests against Ireland and Argentina, he was later named to make his All Black debut against England at Twickenham. For the 2007 Rugby World Cup Ellis was selected ahead of Wellington halfback Piri Weepu.

After the 2011 Rugby World Cup Ellis wasn't selected for the All Blacks Squad again until 2015 against Samoa in Apia, as Tawera Kerr-Barlow was out for the 2015 Super Rugby season and both Aaron Smith and TJ Perenara had played in the 2015 Super Rugby Final.

In 2026 it was announced Ellis would take over as coach for the Kobe Steelers.

== Other ventures ==
In 2018 Ellis helped launch Gravity satellite internet for rural New Zealanders with no access to broadband.

Starting in 2024 Ellis hosted the TV show Moving Houses, taking over from Clarke Gayford. At the end of the 2026 series, Ellis announced he was moving on from the show to move to Japan, and handing hosting duties to Tom Doyle.

== Personal life ==
Ellis is the eldest of three children to Sue and Greg Ellis. He has two siblings. He attended Burnside High School from 1997 to 2001.

Ellis married Emma Bainbridge in 2007. They have two children.
