= John Roe (rugby union) =

- Born: John Roe; 10 April 1977 (age 49) Brisbane, Queensland, Australia
- Height: 187 cm (6 ft 2 in)
- Weight: 105 kg (16 st 7 lb)
- School: Brisbane Boys College
- University: University of Queensland

Rugby union career
- Position: Number Eight
Amateur team(s)
| Years | Team | Apps | (Points) |
| 1999–2008 | Wests | | |
Provincial / State sides
| Years | Team | Apps | (Points) |
| 1999–2008 | Queensland Reds | 107 | (80) |
Super Rugby
| Years | Team | Apps | (Points) |
| 2001–2008 | Queensland Reds | 65 | (85) |
International career
| Years | Team | Apps | (Points) |
| 2003–2005 | Australia | 19 | (10) |
| – | Australia A | | |
National sevens team
| Years | Team | | Comps |
- Australia

John Roe (born 10 April 1977 in Brisbane) is an Australian physician and a former international rugby union player. He played in the back row for the national team and captained the Queensland Reds in Super Rugby. Roe was educated at Brisbane Boys' College. He graduated in medicine on 15 December 2006 from the University of Queensland.

== Career ==
Roe played for Queensland for the first time in a match against the visiting United States team on their 1999 tour to Australia.

In 2001 he made his Super Rugby debut for the Queensland Reds, in a match against the Highlanders, a New Zealand side from Dunedin. He went on to make appearances for both Australia A and the Australian sevens team. In 2003, Roe made his test debut for the Wallabies against Namibia at the 2003 Rugby World Cup held in Australia.

He played his 50th game for the Queensland Reds in the 2004 Super 14 season against the Crusaders, scoring a try in the match.

Roe retired from playing at the age of 31 after the 2008 Super 14 season, following a career-ending shoulder injury.
