= Odwa Ndungane =

South African rugby union player

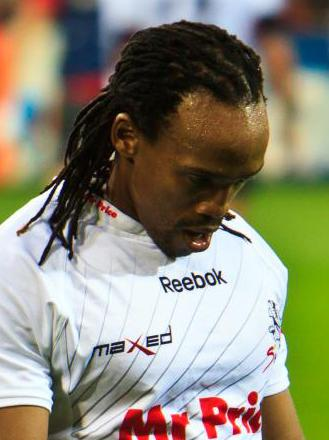
- Full name: Odwa Mzuzo Ndungane
- Born: 20 February 1981 (age 45) Mthatha, South Africa
- Height: 1.84 m (6 ft 1/2 in)
- Weight: 93 kg (14 st 9 lb; 205 lb)
- School: Hudson Park High School, East London
- University: Eastern Cape Technikon
- Notable relative: Akona Ndungane (brother)

Rugby union career
- Position: Wing
Senior career
Years	Team	Apps	(Points)
2000–2003	Border Bulldogs	49	(125)
2004	Bulls	10	(15)
2004	Blue Bulls	2	(0)
2005–2017	Sharks	135	(165)
2005–2017	Sharks XV	9	(15)
2005–2017	Sharks (Currie Cup)	107	(177)
- Correct as of 6 April 2018
International career
Years	Team	Apps	(Points)
2002	South Africa Under-21	1	(0)
2004	South Africa 'A'		
2007	Emerging Springboks	2	(0)
2008–2011	South Africa (tests)	9	(10)
2009–2010	South Africa (tour)	3	(5)
- Correct as of 6 April 2018

Odwa Mzuzo Ndungane (born 20 February 1981 in Mthatha, South Africa) is a former rugby union player that played first class rugby between 2000 and 2017. He played on the wing and spent the bulk of his career playing for the Sharks in the Super Rugby competition.

He made his Test debut against Italy in a 26–0 victory in Cape Town in 2008 ahead of, amongst others, his twin brother Akona. He retired after the 2017 Currie Cup Premier Division.
