= Wycliff Palu =

Former Australian rugby union player

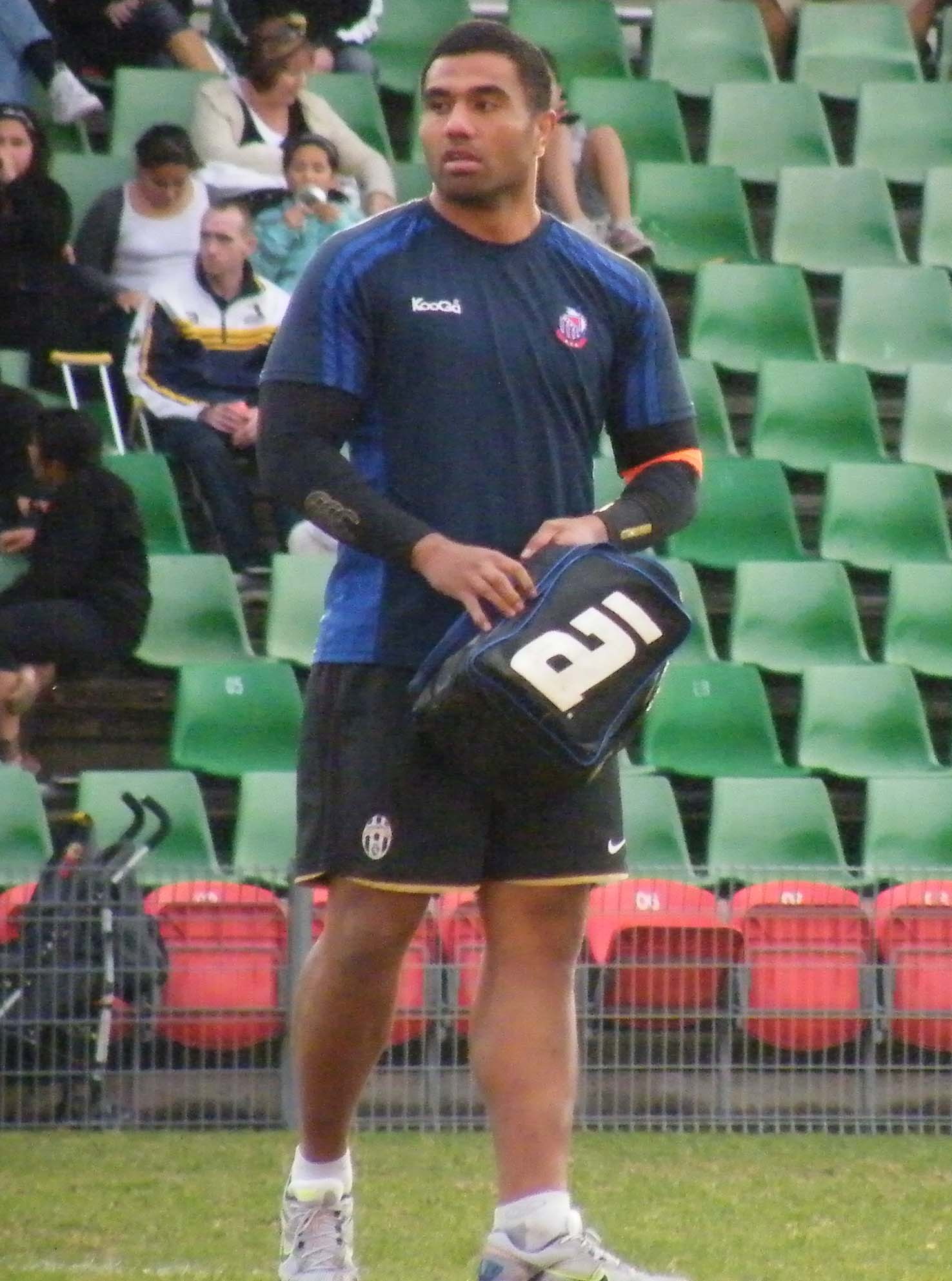
- Born: Wycliff L. Palu; 27 July 1982 (age 44) Sydney, New South Wales, Australia
- Height: 194 cm (6 ft 4 in)
- Weight: 120 kg (18 st 13 lb; 265 lb)
- Notable relative(s): Keta Iongi (mother); Mark Gerrard; Mo'onia Gerrard

Rugby union career
- Position: Number Eight / Blindside Flanker
Senior career
Years	Team	Apps	(Points)
2007	Central Coast Rays	3	(0)
2016–2018	Toyota Verblitz	14	(10)
2018–2021	Kurita Water Gush	18	(20)
- Correct as of 22 February 2022
Super Rugby
Years	Team	Apps	(Points)
2005–2016	Waratahs	134	(65)
- Correct as of 15 July 2016
International career
Years	Team	Apps	(Points)
2006–2016	Australia	58	(5)
- Correct as of 25 June 2016

Wycliff Palu (born 27 July 1982), known as Cliffy Palu, is an Australian former professional rugby union footballer of Tongan descent. He played for the New South Wales Waratahs in Super Rugby and represented Australia in 58 tests.

== Early life ==
Palu was born in Sydney. His mother was Keta Iongi, a Tongan sprinter who won several gold medals at the South Pacific Games. He attended Balgowlah Boys High School.

== Career ==
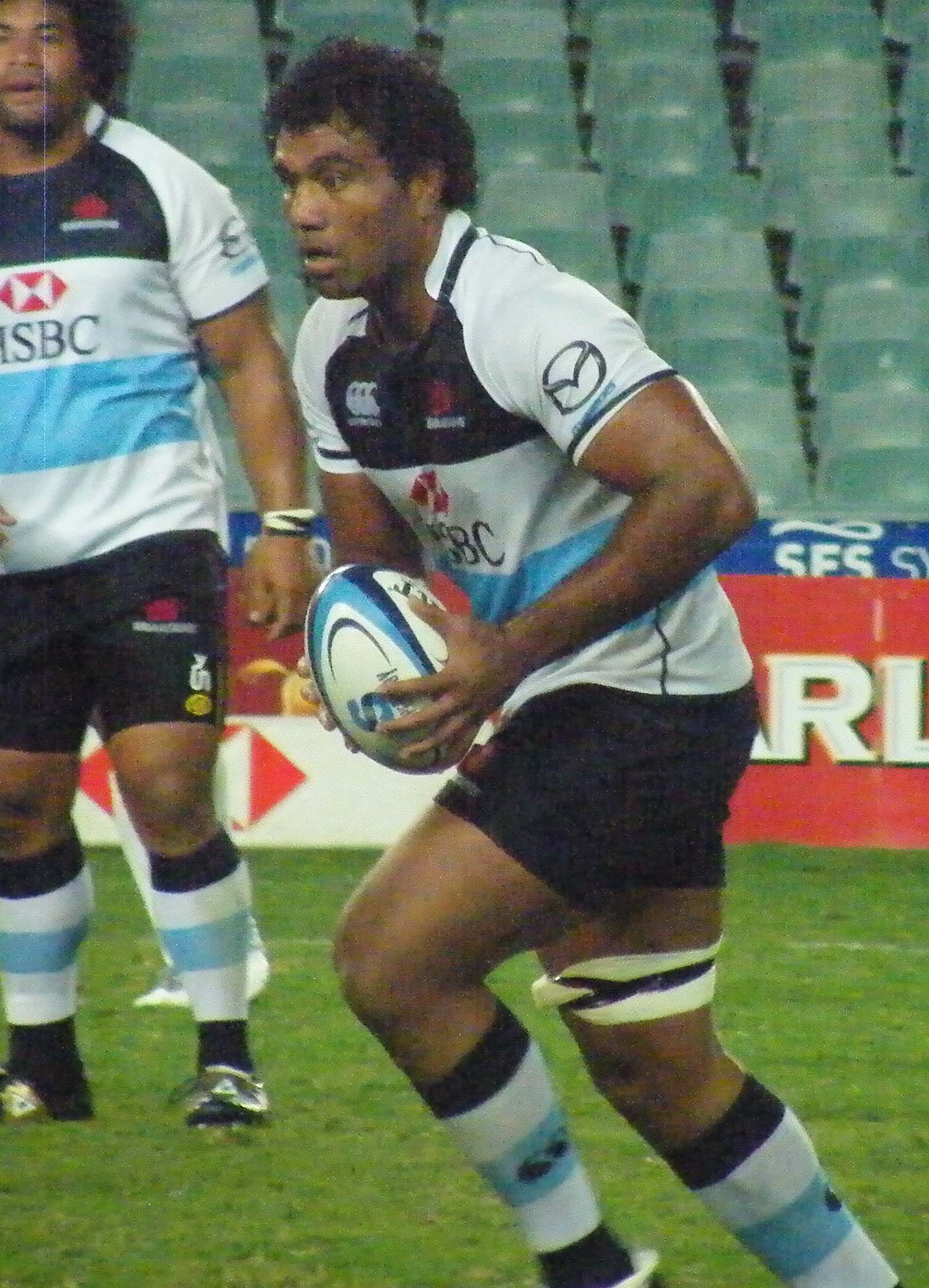
Palu in 2011

A hard running backrow player Palu made his provincial debut in a match against a Samoan side in 2003 after which he had a stint at NRL side St. George Illawarra Dragons before returning to Rugby Union. He played for the New South Wales Waratahs in their first trial match of pre-season 2005, against the Crusaders, in which he was awarded the man-of-the-match award. After his good performances during the Waratahs' pre-season, he made his Super 12 debut in week one of the 2005 season against the Chiefs. He was then injured in the week six loss against the Crusaders which saw him out for a lot of the season.

Palu sustained a shoulder injury midway through the 2006 Super 14 season, as he came off the bench in a semi-final against the Hurricanes. Palu was then included in the Wallabies' 2006 mid-year squad.

Palu was named at number eight for the opening Tri-Nations match against New Zealand on 18 July 2009, after he recovered from a hand injury which forced him to miss all of Australia's matches earlier in the year.

Palu suffered a knee-ligament injury against the Crusaders in April 2010, then a hamstring injury during trials in early 2011. He spent eleven months in recovery, and played only six Super Rugby matches for the Waratahs in the 2011 season. He played in two pool matches for Australia at the 2011 Rugby World Cup in New Zealand but a recurrence of his hamstring injury playing against the United States ruled him out of the remainder of the tournament.

He returned to the Wallabies for a successful season in 2012, starting at Number 8 for the three-nil test series win against Wales and Australia's drawn match in Brisbane against New Zealand before test wins against England, Italy and Wales on the 2012 end-of-year tour. Palu started in all three home tests against the British and Irish Lions in 2013, with the series being won by the visitors by two matches to one. He played a further ten matches for Australia, including one at the 2015 Rugby World Cup, making his last appearance against England in June 2016 to take his total to 58 tests.

The following month, Palu completed the twelfth and final season of his career with the Waratahs, which had included starting at Number 8 for the team's Super Rugby title-winning season in 2014. He joined Japanese club Toyota Verblitz for his last professional club contract in 2016 and 2017.

== Controversies ==
In late 2009 during the drawn Test between Ireland and Australia, Palu was given a yellow card by the South African referee Jonathan Kaplan for allegedly making a shoulder charge on Rob Kearney, Ireland's fullback. However, it's suggested Kearney in fact made the shoulder charge on Palu whilst carrying the ball.
