= 2018 Ireland rugby union tour of Australia =

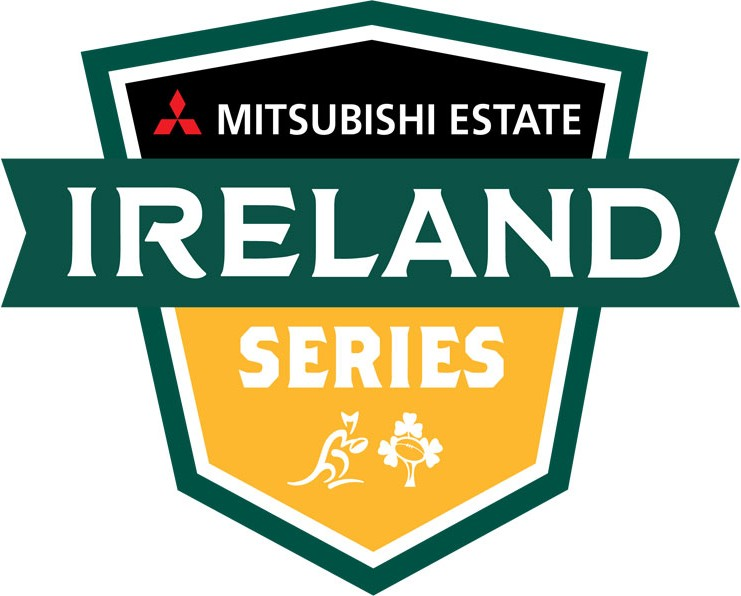
- Date: 9–23 June 2018
- Coach: Joe Schmidt
- Tour captains: Rory Best; Peter O'Mahony
- Test series winners: Ireland (2–1)
- Top test point scorer: Johnny Sexton (31)
- Top test try scorers: Eight players: Kurtley Beale (1); Andrew Conway (1); Bernard Foley (1); Tadhg Furlong (1); Marika Koroibete (1); David Pocock (1); CJ Stander (1); Taniela Tupou (1)
Summary
P	W	D	L
Total
3	2	0	1
Test match
3	2	0	1
Opponent
P	W	D	L
Australia
3	2	0	1

Tour chronology
- ← Japan 2017 New Zealand 2022 →

Known as the Mitsubishi Estate Ireland Series for sponsorship reasons, Ireland played a three-Test series against Australia as part of the 2018 June rugby union tests. It was the first time Ireland had played a Test series against Australia in Australia since 2010. The series was part of the sixth year of the global rugby calendar established by World Rugby, which would run through to 2019.

Australia's win in the first Test was Ireland's first loss in thirteen games. After winning the third and final Test match, however, Ireland clinched a series on Australian soil for the first time since 1979. It was also the first time Ireland had won the Lansdowne Cup in a Test series rather than a one-off match.

== Schedule ==
Date and time	Venue	Home	Score	Away
9 June, 20:05 AEST (UTC+10)	Lang Park, Brisbane	Australia	18–9	Ireland
16 June, 20:05 AEST (UTC+10)	Melbourne Rectangular Stadium, Melbourne	Australia	21–26	Ireland
23 June, 20:05 AEST (UTC+10)	Sydney Football Stadium, Sydney	Australia	16–20	Ireland

== Venues ==
The venues were revealed in Sydney in October 2017 alongside the announcement of the tour by Rugby Australia chief executive Bill Pulver and President of Ireland Michael D. Higgins.

Brisbane	Melbourne	Sydney
Lang Park	Melbourne Rectangular Stadium	Sydney Football Stadium
Capacity: 52,500	Capacity: 29,500	Capacity: 45,500
2018 Ireland rugby union tour of Australia is located in Australia

== Squads ==
Note: Ages, caps and clubs are as per 9 June, the first test match of the tour.

=== Ireland ===
On 23 May 2018, Joe Schmidt named a 32-man squad for the 2018 June rugby union tests.

On 31 May, tour captain Rory Best was ruled out of the test series with a hamstring injury. Munster's Niall Scannell was called-up to replace him, with Peter O'Mahony and Johnny Sexton sharing the captaincy duties for the tour.

Dave Kilcoyne trained with the squad as injury cover for Cian Healy ahead of the third Test, whilst Will Addison also trained with the team, though neither player was officially added to the touring squad.

Coaching team:

- Head coach: Joe Schmidt
- Defence coach: Andy Farrell
- Forwards coach: Simon Easterby
- Scrum coach: Greg Feek

Player	Position	Date of birth (age)	Caps	Club/province
Rory Best (c)	Hooker	15 August 1982 (aged 35)	111	Ulster
Seán Cronin	Hooker	6 May 1986 (aged 32)	61	Leinster
Rob Herring	Hooker	27 August 1990 (aged 27)	3	Ulster
Niall Scannell	Hooker	8 April 1992 (aged 26)	7	Munster
Tadhg Furlong	Prop	14 November 1992 (aged 25)	23	Leinster
Cian Healy	Prop	7 October 1987 (aged 30)	78	Leinster
Jack McGrath	Prop	11 October 1989 (aged 28)	47	Leinster
Andrew Porter	Prop	16 January 1996 (aged 22)	7	Leinster
John Ryan	Prop	2 August 1988 (aged 29)	13	Munster
Tadhg Beirne	Lock	8 January 1992 (aged 26)	0	Scarlets
Iain Henderson	Lock	21 February 1992 (aged 26)	38	Ulster
Quinn Roux	Lock	30 October 1990 (aged 27)	5	Connacht
James Ryan	Lock	24 July 1996 (aged 21)	8	Leinster
Devin Toner	Lock	29 June 1986 (aged 31)	58	Leinster
Dan Leavy	Flanker	23 May 1994 (aged 24)	9	Leinster
Jordi Murphy	Flanker	22 April 1991 (aged 27)	20	Leinster
Peter O'Mahony (vc)	Flanker	17 September 1989 (aged 28)	47	Munster
Jack Conan	Number 8	29 July 1992 (aged 25)	7	Leinster
CJ Stander	Number 8	5 April 1990 (aged 28)	23	Munster
John Cooney	Scrum-half	1 May 1990 (aged 28)	1	Ulster
Kieran Marmion	Scrum-half	11 February 1992 (aged 26)	21	Connacht
Conor Murray	Scrum-half	20 April 1989 (aged 29)	64	Munster
Ross Byrne	Fly-half	8 April 1995 (aged 23)	0	Leinster
Joey Carbery	Fly-half	1 November 1995 (aged 22)	10	Leinster
Johnny Sexton (vc)	Fly-half	11 July 1985 (aged 32)	73	Leinster
Bundee Aki	Centre	7 April 1990 (aged 28)	7	Connacht
Robbie Henshaw	Centre	12 June 1993 (aged 24)	33	Leinster
Garry Ringrose	Centre	26 January 1995 (aged 23)	13	Leinster
Andrew Conway	Wing	11 July 1991 (aged 26)	6	Munster
Keith Earls	Wing	2 October 1987 (aged 30)	67	Munster
Jacob Stockdale	Wing	6 April 1996 (aged 22)	9	Ulster
Rob Kearney	Fullback	26 March 1986 (aged 32)	83	Leinster
Jordan Larmour	Fullback	10 June 1997 (aged 20)	3	Leinster

=== Australia ===
On 30 May 2018, Michael Cheika named a 32-man squad for the three-Test series against Ireland.

On 3 June, Pete Samu was added to the squad after New Zealand Rugby (NZR) agreed to release the flanker, who plays for Crusaders in New Zealand, for the Test series. On the same day however, hooker Jordan Uelese was ruled out of the series with a knee injury sustained playing for Melbourne Rebels. Tolu Latu was called-up to the squad to replace Uelese.

On 18 June, Jake Gordon was called-up to replace the injured Will Genia.

Coaching team:

- Head coach: Michael Cheika
- Attack coach: Stephen Larkham
- Forwards coach: Simon Raiwalui
- Defence coach: Nathan Grey

Player	Position	Date of birth (age)	Caps	Franchise/province
Folau Fainga'a	Hooker	5 May 1995 (aged 23)	0	(Australia) Brumbies
Brandon Paenga-Amosa	Hooker	25 December 1995 (aged 22)	0	(Australia) Queensland Reds
Tolu Latu	Hooker	23 February 1993 (aged 25)	4	(Australia) Waratahs
Jordan Uelese	Hooker	24 January 1997 (aged 21)	2	(Australia) Melbourne Rebels
Allan Alaalatoa	Prop	28 January 1994 (aged 24)	22	(Australia) Brumbies
Sekope Kepu	Prop	5 February 1986 (aged 32)	91	(Australia) Waratahs
Tom Robertson	Prop	28 August 1994 (aged 23)	18	(Australia) Waratahs
Scott Sio	Prop	16 October 1991 (age 34)	43	(Australia) Brumbies
Taniela Tupou	Prop	10 May 1996 (age 30)	1	(Australia) Queensland Reds
Rory Arnold	Lock	1 July 1990 (aged 27)	15	(Australia) Brumbies
Adam Coleman	Lock	7 October 1991 (aged 26)	20	(Australia) Melbourne Rebels
Rob Simmons	Lock	19 April 1989 (aged 29)	82	(Australia) Waratahs
Izack Rodda	Lock	20 August 1996 (aged 21)	4	(Australia) Queensland Reds
Lukhan Tui	Lock	19 September 1996 (aged 21)	4	(Australia) Queensland Reds
Ned Hanigan	Flanker	11 April 1995 (aged 23)	12	(Australia) Waratahs
Michael Hooper (c)	Flanker	29 October 1991 (aged 26)	79	(Australia) Waratahs
David Pocock	Flanker	23 April 1988 (aged 30)	66	(Australia) Brumbies
Peter Samu	Flanker	17 December 1991 (aged 26)	0	(New Zealand) Crusaders
Caleb Timu	Number 8	22 February 1994 (aged 24)	0	(Australia) Queensland Reds
Will Genia	Scrum-half	17 January 1988 (aged 30)	88	(Australia) Melbourne Rebels
Jake Gordon	Scrum-half	6 July 1993 (aged 24)	0	(Australia) Waratahs
Nick Phipps	Scrum-half	9 January 1989 (aged 29)	61	(Australia) Waratahs
Joe Powell	Scrum-half	11 April 1994 (aged 24)	3	(Australia) Brumbies
Bernard Foley	Fly-half	8 September 1989 (aged 28)	55	(Australia) Waratahs
Kurtley Beale	Centre	6 January 1989 (aged 29)	71	(Australia) Waratahs
Samu Kerevi	Centre	27 September 1993 (aged 24)	18	(Australia) Queensland Reds
Tevita Kuridrani	Centre	31 March 1991 (aged 27)	58	(Australia) Brumbies
Sefa Naivalu	Centre	7 January 1992 (aged 26)	7	(Australia) Melbourne Rebels
Curtis Rona	Centre	26 May 1992 (aged 26)	3	(Australia) Waratahs
Dane Haylett-Petty	Wing	18 June 1989 (aged 28)	18	(Australia) Melbourne Rebels
Reece Hodge	Wing	26 August 1994 (aged 23)	24	(Australia) Melbourne Rebels
Marika Koroibete	Wing	26 July 1992 (aged 25)	8	(Australia) Melbourne Rebels
Tom Banks	Fullback	18 June 1994 (aged 23)	0	(Australia) Brumbies
Israel Folau	Fullback	3 April 1989 (aged 29)	62	(Australia) Waratahs
Jack Maddocks	Fullback	5 February 1997 (aged 21)	0	(Australia) Melbourne Rebels

== Matches ==
=== First Test ===
9 June 2018
20:05 AEST (UTC+10)

Australia	18–9	Ireland
Try: Foley 33' m Pocock 71' c Con: Foley (1/2) 73'; Pen: Foley (2/2) 2', 69'	Report	Pen: Carbery (3/3) 13', 25', 55'

Lang Park, Brisbane
Attendance: 46,273
Referee: Marius van der Westhuizen (South Africa)

FB	15	Israel Folau
RW	14	Dane Haylett-Petty	(substituted off) 62'
OC	13	Samu Kerevi
IC	12	Kurtley Beale
LW	11	Marika Koroibete
FH	10	Bernard Foley
SH	9	Will Genia	(substituted off) 73'
N8	8	Caleb Timu	(substituted off) 48'	(substituted on) 58'	(substituted off) 62'
OF	7	Michael Hooper (c)
BF	6	David Pocock	(substituted off) 73'
RL	5	Adam Coleman
LL	4	Izack Rodda	(substituted off) 54'
TP	3	Sekope Kepu	(substituted off) 55'
HK	2	Brandon Paenga-Amosa	(substituted off) 55'
LP	1	Scott Sio	(substituted off) 62'
Replacements:
HK	16	Tolu Latu	(substituted on) 55'
PR	17	Tom Robertson	(substituted on) 62'
PR	18	Taniela Tupou	(substituted on) 55'
LK	19	Rob Simmons	(substituted on) 54'
LK	20	Lukhan Tui	(substituted on) 73'
FL	21	Pete Samu	(substituted on) 48'	(substituted off) 58'	(substituted on) 62'
SH	22	Nick Phipps	(substituted on) 73'
WG	23	Reece Hodge	(substituted on) 62'
Coach:
Michael Cheika

FB	15	Rob Kearney
RW	14	Keith Earls	(substituted off) 24'
OC	13	Robbie Henshaw
IC	12	Bundee Aki
LW	11	Jacob Stockdale
FH	10	Joey Carbery	(substituted off) 56'
SH	9	Conor Murray	(substituted off) 77'
N8	8	CJ Stander
OF	7	Jordi Murphy
BF	6	Peter O'Mahony (c)	(substituted off) 68'
RL	5	Iain Henderson	(substituted off) 64'
LL	4	James Ryan
TP	3	John Ryan	(substituted off) 47'
HK	2	Rob Herring	(substituted off) 56'
LP	1	Jack McGrath	(substituted off) 47'
Replacements:
HK	16	Seán Cronin	(substituted on) 56'
PR	17	Cian Healy	(substituted on) 47'
PR	18	Tadhg Furlong	(substituted on) 47'
LK	19	Quinn Roux	(substituted on) 64'
N8	20	Jack Conan	(substituted on) 68'
SH	21	Kieran Marmion	(substituted on) 77'
FH	22	Johnny Sexton	(substituted on) 56'
FB	23	Jordan Larmour	(substituted on) 24'
Coach:
Joe Schmidt

Man of the Match:
Will Genia (Australia)

Touch judges:
Pascal Gaüzère (France)
Paul Williams (New Zealand)
Television match official:
Ben Skeen (New Zealand)

Notes:

- Brandon Paenga-Amosa, Pete Samu and Caleb Timu (all Australia) made their international debuts.

=== Second Test ===
16 June 2018
20:05 AEST (UTC+10)

Australia	21–26	Ireland
Try: Beale 1' c Penalty try 25'; Tupou 77' c Con: Foley (2/2) 2', 77'	Report	Try: Conway 6' c Furlong 53' c Con: Sexton (2/2) 7', 55'; Pen: Sexton (4/5) 12', 16', 21', 65'

Melbourne Rectangular Stadium, Melbourne
Attendance: 29,018
Referee: Paul Williams (New Zealand)

FB	15	Israel Folau
RW	14	Dane Haylett-Petty
OC	13	Samu Kerevi
IC	12	Kurtley Beale		(substituted off) 63'
LW	11	Marika Koroibete	(yellow card) 6' to 16'
FH	10	Bernard Foley
SH	9	Will Genia		(substituted off) 26'
N8	8	Caleb Timu		(substituted off) 40'
OF	7	Michael Hooper (c)
BF	6	David Pocock
RL	5	Adam Coleman		(substituted off) 42'
LL	4	Izack Rodda		(substituted off) 55'
TP	3	Sekope Kepu		(substituted off) 50'
HK	2	Brandon Paenga-Amosa		(substituted off) 40'
LP	1	Scott Sio		(substituted off) 71'
Replacements:
HK	16	Tolu Latu		(substituted on) 40'
PR	17	Tom Robertson		(substituted on) 71'
PR	18	Taniela Tupou		(substituted on) 50'
LK	19	Rob Simmons		(substituted on) 42'
LK	20	Lukhan Tui		(substituted on) 40'
FL	21	Pete Samu		(substituted on) 55'
SH	22	Nick Phipps		(substituted on) 26'
WG	23	Reece Hodge		(substituted on) 63'
Coach:
Michael Cheika

FB	15	Rob Kearney
RW	14	Andrew Conway		(substituted off) 14'
OC	13	Garry Ringrose
IC	12	Robbie Henshaw
LW	11	Keith Earls
FH	10	Johnny Sexton		(substituted off) 78'
SH	9	Conor Murray
N8	8	CJ Stander
OF	7	Dan Leavy		(substituted off) 31'	(substituted on) 38'	(substituted off) 40'
BF	6	Peter O'Mahony (c)		(substituted off) 63'
RL	5	James Ryan
LL	4	Devin Toner		(substituted off) 75'
TP	3	Tadhg Furlong		(substituted off) 71'
HK	2	Niall Scannell		(substituted off) 48'
LP	1	Cian Healy	(yellow card) 26' to 36'			(substituted off) 45'
Replacements:
HK	16	Rob Herring		(substituted on) 48'
PR	17	Jack McGrath	(yellow card) 76' to 80'	(substituted on) 31'	(substituted off) 38'	(substituted on) 45'
PR	18	Andrew Porter		(substituted on) 71'
LK	19	Tadhg Beirne		(substituted on) 63'
FL	20	Jordi Murphy				(substituted on) 40'
SH	21	John Cooney		(substituted on) 78'
FH	22	Joey Carbery		(substituted on) 75'
FB	23	Jordan Larmour		(substituted on) 14'
Coach:
Joe Schmidt

Man of the Match:
Tadhg Furlong (Ireland)

Touch judges:
Pascal Gaüzère (France)
Marius van der Westhuizen (South Africa)
Television match official:
Ben Skeen (New Zealand)

Notes:

- Tadhg Beirne (Ireland) made his international debut.
- This was Ireland's first win against Australia in Australia since their 9–3 victory in Sydney in 1979.

=== Third Test ===
23 June 2018
20:05 AEST (UTC+10)

Australia	16–20	Ireland
Try: Koroibete 53' c Con: Foley (1/1) 55'; Pen: Foley (3/4) 12', 21', 39'	Report	Try: Stander 43' m Pen: Sexton (5/5) 8', 29', 34', 40'+2, 78'

Sydney Football Stadium, Sydney
Attendance: 44,085
Referee: Pascal Gaüzère (France)

FB	15	Israel Folau	(yellow card) 30' to 40'
RW	14	Dane Haylett-Petty
OC	13	Samu Kerevi
IC	12	Kurtley Beale
LW	11	Marika Koroibete		(substituted off) 68'
FH	10	Bernard Foley
SH	9	Nick Phipps		(substituted off) 60'
N8	8	David Pocock
OF	7	Michael Hooper (c)		(substituted off) 15'
BF	6	Lukhan Tui
RL	5	Adam Coleman		(substituted off) 44'
LL	4	Izack Rodda		(substituted off) 71'
TP	3	Sekope Kepu		(substituted off) 55'
HK	2	Brandon Paenga-Amosa		(substituted off) 40'
LP	1	Scott Sio		(substituted off) 60'
Replacements:
HK	16	Tolu Latu		(substituted on) 40'
PR	17	Tom Robertson		(substituted on) 60'
PR	18	Taniela Tupou		(substituted on) 55'
LK	19	Rob Simmons		(substituted on) 44'
FL	20	Ned Hanigan		(substituted on) 71'
FL	21	Pete Samu		(substituted on) 15'
SH	22	Joe Powell		(substituted on) 60'
WG	23	Reece Hodge		(substituted on) 68'
Coach:
Michael Cheika

FB	15	Rob Kearney		(substituted off) 57'
RW	14	Keith Earls
OC	13	Robbie Henshaw
IC	12	Bundee Aki
LW	11	Jacob Stockdale	(yellow card) 20' to 30'
FH	10	Johnny Sexton
SH	9	Conor Murray
N8	8	Jack Conan		(substituted off) 68'
OF	7	Peter O'Mahony (c)		(substituted off) 30'
BF	6	CJ Stander
RL	5	James Ryan
LL	4	Devin Toner
TP	3	Tadhg Furlong		(substituted off) 66'
HK	2	Niall Scannell		(substituted off) 55'
LP	1	Jack McGrath		(substituted off) 55'
Replacements:
HK	16	Rob Herring		(substituted on) 55'
PR	17	Cian Healy		(substituted on) 55'
PR	18	John Ryan		(substituted on) 66'
LK	19	Tadhg Beirne		(substituted on) 68'
FL	20	Jordi Murphy		(substituted on) 30'
SH	21	Kieran Marmion
FH	22	Ross Byrne
FB	23	Jordan Larmour		(substituted on) 57'
Coach:
Joe Schmidt

Man of the Match:
CJ Stander (Ireland)

Touch judges:
Paul Williams (New Zealand)
Cam Stone (New Zealand)
Television match official:
Ben Skeen (New Zealand)

Notes:

- Peter O'Mahony and Jack McGrath (both Ireland) won their 50th test caps.
- This was Ireland's first series victory against Australia since 1979, whilst Ireland also retained the Lansdowne Cup.

== Statistics ==
Key

- Con: Conversions
- Pen: Penalties
- DG: Drop goals
- Pts: Points

=== Ireland statistics ===
Name	Played	Tries	Con	Pen	DG	Pts	Temporarily suspended	Sent off (straight red)
Johnny Sexton	3	0	2	9	0	31	–	–
Joey Carbery	2	0	0	3	0	9	–	–
Tadhg Furlong	3	1	0	0	0	5	–	–
CJ Stander	3	1	0	0	0	5	–	–
Andrew Conway	1	1	0	0	0	5	–	–
Keith Earls	3	0	0	0	0	0	–	–
Cian Healy	3	0	0	0	0	0	1	–
Robbie Henshaw	3	0	0	0	0	0	–	–
Rob Herring	3	0	0	0	0	0	–	–
Rob Kearney	3	0	0	0	0	0	–	–
Jordan Larmour	3	0	0	0	0	0	–	–
Jack McGrath	3	0	0	0	0	0	1	–
Jordi Murphy	3	0	0	0	0	0	–	–
Conor Murray	3	0	0	0	0	0	–	–
Peter O'Mahony	3	0	0	0	0	0	–	–
James Ryan	3	0	0	0	0	0	–	–
Bundee Aki	2	0	0	0	0	0	–	–
Tadhg Beirne	2	0	0	0	0	0	–	–
Jack Conan	2	0	0	0	0	0	–	–
Niall Scannell	2	0	0	0	0	0	–	–
Jacob Stockdale	2	0	0	0	0	0	1	–
John Cooney	1	0	0	0	0	0	–	–
Seán Cronin	1	0	0	0	0	0	–	–
Iain Henderson	1	0	0	0	0	0	–	–
Dan Leavy	1	0	0	0	0	0	–	–
Kieran Marmion	1	0	0	0	0	0	–	–
Andrew Porter	1	0	0	0	0	0	–	–
Garry Ringrose	1	0	0	0	0	0	–	–
Quinn Roux	1	0	0	0	0	0	–	–
Rory Best	Did not play – Withdrawn due to injury ahead of tour							
Ross Byrne	Did not play							

=== Test series statistics ===
Name	Team	Tries	Con	Pen	DG	Pts
Johnny Sexton	Ireland	0	2	9	0	31
Bernard Foley	Australia	1	4	5	0	28
Joey Carbery	Ireland	0	0	3	0	9
Kurtley Beale	Australia	1	0	0	0	5
Andrew Conway	Ireland	1	0	0	0	5
Tadhg Furlong	Ireland	1	0	0	0	5
Marika Koroibete	Australia	1	0	0	0	5
David Pocock	Australia	1	0	0	0	5
CJ Stander	Ireland	1	0	0	0	5
Taniela Tupou	Australia	1	0	0	0	5

== See also ==
- 2018 June rugby union tests
- History of rugby union matches between Australia and Ireland
