= Juan Imhoff =

Argentine rugby union footballer

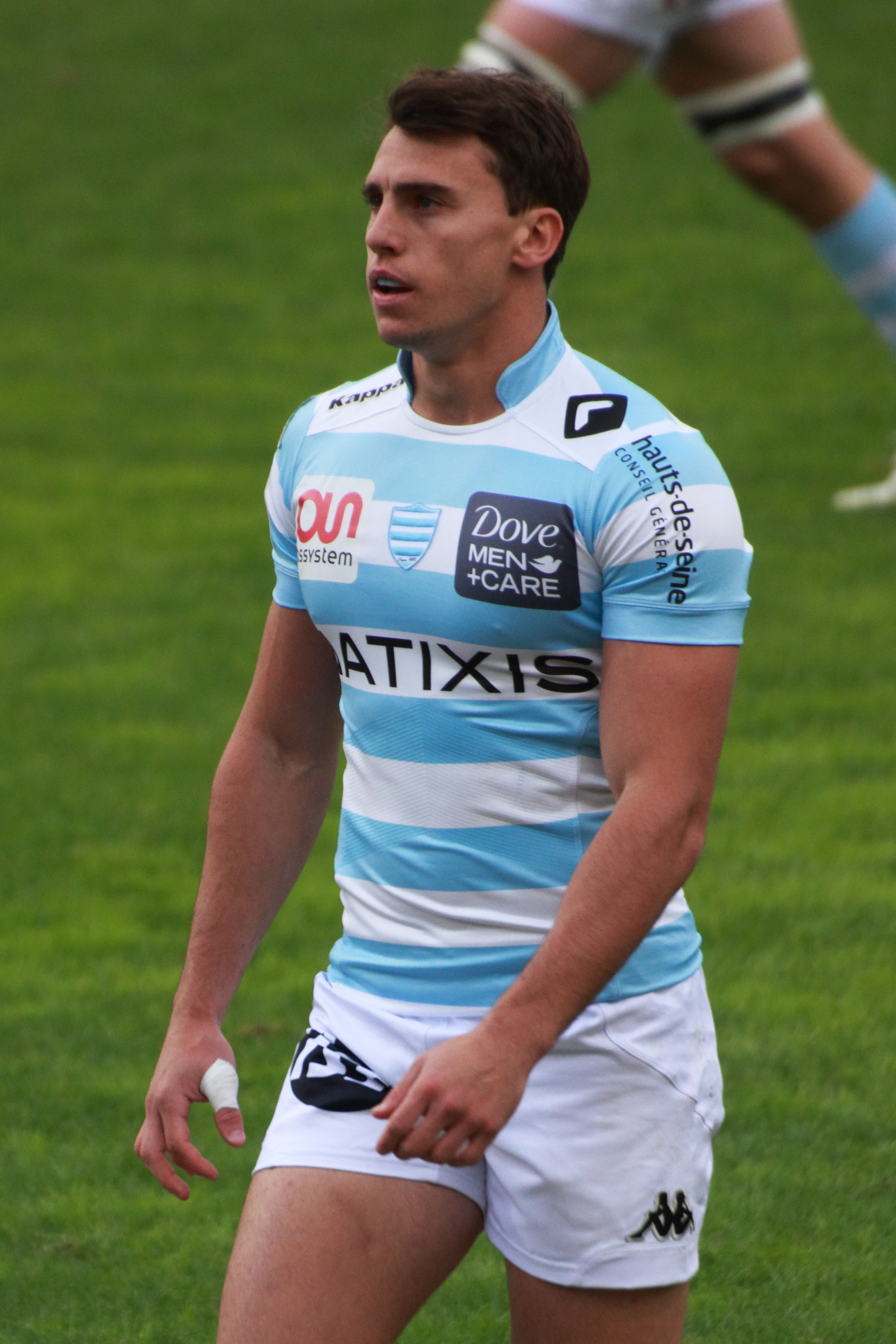
- Imhoff representing Racing 92 during the Top 14
- Full name: Juan José Imhoff
- Born: 11 May 1988 (age 38) Rosario, Argentina
- Height: 1.86 m (6 ft 1 in)
- Weight: 85 kg (187 lb; 13 st 5 lb)

Rugby union career
- Position(s): Wing, Fullback
- Current team: Racing 92
Senior career
Years	Team	Apps	(Points)
2011	Pampas XV	9	(45)
2011–2024	Racing 92	259	(560)
- Correct as of 28 August 2023
International career
Years	Team	Apps	(Points)
2009−2010	Argentina Jaguars	9	(40)
2009–2023	Argentina	42	(85)
- Correct as of 28 August 2023
National sevens team
Years	Team		Comps
2009–2016	Argentina		3
- Correct as of 28 December 2024

Juan José Imhoff (born 11 May 1988) is a former Argentine professional rugby union player who played as a wing.

== Club career ==
He played for Duendes Rugby Club, from 2009 to 2011, in the Nacional de Clubes, which he won twice, in 2009 and 2011. He moved afterwards to Racing 92 in the French Top 14, where he has played since 2011/12 till 2024.

He was part of the Pampas XV at the 2011 Vodacom Cup in South Africa, winning this tournament.

== International career ==
He also played for Argentina Jaguars (now Argentina XV) He has 35 caps for Argentina, since his first game at the 89–6 win over Chile, at 20 May 2009, for the South American Rugby Championship, in Montevideo, Uruguay, where he scored 4 tries. He was also part of the Argentine squad at the 2011 Rugby World Cup, playing in four games, three as a substitute, and scoring 2 tries, 10 points on aggregate. Imhoff has been a member of the Argentina squad that competed in the Rugby Championship in 2012, 2013, 2014 and 2015. Imhoff played at the 2015 Rugby Championship, where Argentina reached the 3rd place, scoring 3 tries in the historical first ever win over South Africa by 37–25, in Durban. This historical feat made him one of the two top try scorers of the tournament with 3 tries and 15 points. Imhoff has currently 21 tries scored for his national team, in an aggregate of 105 points.

He competed at the 2015 Rugby World Cup scoring 3 tries. Imhoff was also part of Argentina's Olympic sevens team for the 2016 Summer Olympics. Imhoff returned to the Pumas for their first victory against the All Blacks of New Zealand, as part of the Tri Nations Series on November 14, 2020.

== Honours ==
Racing 92

- 1× Top 14: 2016
