= 2015 Rugby Championship =

- Date: 17 July – 8 August 2015
- Countries: Argentina; Australia; New Zealand; South Africa

Final positions
- Champions: Australia (4th title)
- Bledisloe Cup: New Zealand
- Freedom Cup: New Zealand
- Mandela Challenge Plate: Australia
- Puma Trophy: Australia

Tournament statistics
- Matches played: 6
- Tries scored: 33 (5.5 per match)
- Attendance: 243,416 (40,569 per match)
- Top scorer(s): (South Africa) Handré Pollard (30)
- Most tries: (Australia) Adam Ashley-Cooper (3) (Argentina) Juan Imhoff (3)

The 2015 Rugby Championship (Note: The tournament was known for sponsorship reasons as The Castle Rugby Championship in South Africa, The Investec Rugby Championship in New Zealand, The Castrol Edge Rugby Championship in Australia and The Personal Rugby Championship in Argentina.) was the fourth edition of the expanded annual southern hemisphere Rugby Championship consisting of Argentina, Australia, South Africa and New Zealand.

The 2015 Championship was a shorter competition than normal, with each team playing each other once, rather than twice (home and away). This was so that teams had a longer preparation time ahead of the 2015 Rugby World Cup which started on 18 September. However, New Zealand hosted an additional match against Australia in Auckland on 15 August which acted as the second Bledisloe Cup test and as a World Cup warm-up. Argentina hosted a second match against South Africa on the same date.

Australia won the Championship, becoming just the second team to win the tournament since 2012. However, including the previous format of the Championship, Australia claimed the title for the first time since 2011, and achieved a 100% win rate for the first time ever in either format.

South Africa finished bottom of the table. This was also the first ever year that South Africa failed to record a single win in either the Rugby Championship or Tri Nations Series.

== Standings ==
Pos	Team	Pld	W	D	L	PF	PA	PD	TF	TA	TB	LB	Pts
1	Australia (C)	3	3	0	0	85	48	+37	10	4	1	0	13
2	New Zealand	3	2	0	1	85	65	+20	10	7	1	0	9
3	Argentina	3	1	0	2	64	98	−34	9	12	1	0	5
4	South Africa	3	0	0	3	65	88	−23	7	10	0	2	2

(C) Champion

== Fixtures ==
=== Week 1 ===
17 July 2015
19:35 NZST (UTC+12)

(1 BP) New Zealand	39–18	Argentina
Try: McCaw 20' m Nonu 40' c Piutau 42' c Read 48' c Taylor 71 c Con: Carter (4/5) 40', 44', 49', 73'; Pen: Carter (2/4) 5', 16'	Report	Try: Creevy (2) 55' m, 61' c Con: Sánchez (1/2) 61'; Pen: Sánchez (2/3) 12', 33'

Rugby League Park, Christchurch
Attendance: 17,512
Referee: Craig Joubert (South Africa)

FB	15	Israel Dagg
RW	14	Waisake Naholo	(substituted off) 51'
OC	13	Ma'a Nonu	(substituted off) 73'
IC	12	Sonny Bill Williams
LW	11	Charles Piutau
FH	10	Dan Carter
SH	9	TJ Perenara	(substituted off) 70'
N8	8	Kieran Read
OF	7	Richie McCaw (c)
BF	6	Jerome Kaino	(substituted off) 70'
RL	5	Brodie Retallick
LL	4	Luke Romano	(substituted off) 59'
TP	3	Owen Franks	(substituted off) 54'
HK	2	Keven Mealamu	(substituted off) 59'
LP	1	Tony Woodcock	(substituted off) 59'
Replacements:
HK	16	Codie Taylor	(substituted on) 59'
PR	17	Wyatt Crockett	(substituted on) 59'
PR	18	Nepo Laulala	(substituted on) 54'
LK	19	Jeremy Thrush	(substituted on) 59'
FL	20	Liam Messam	(substituted on) 70'
SH	21	Andrew Ellis	(substituted on) 70'
FH	22	Colin Slade	(substituted on) 51'
CE	23	Ryan Crotty	(substituted on) 73'
Coach:
(New Zealand) Steve Hansen

FB	15	Joaquín Tuculet	(substituted off) 55'
RW	14	Horacio Agulla
OC	13	Marcelo Bosch
IC	12	Jerónimo de la Fuente	(substituted off) 68'
LW	11	Santiago Cordero
FH	10	Nicolás Sánchez
SH	9	Tomás Cubelli	(substituted off) 55'
N8	8	Facundo Isa
OF	7	Juan Martín Fernández Lobbe
BF	6	Juan Manuel Leguizamón	(substituted off) 49'
RL	5	Guido Petti	(substituted off) 62'
LL	4	Manuel Carizza
TP	3	Ramiro Herrera	(substituted off) 54'
HK	2	Agustín Creevy (c)	(substituted off) 62'
LP	1	Marcos Ayerza	(substituted off) 62'
Replacements:
HK	16	Julián Montoya	(substituted on) 62'
PR	17	Lucas Noguera Paz	(substituted on) 62'
PR	18	Nahuel Tetaz Chaparro	(substituted on) 54'
N8	19	Benjamín Macome	(substituted on) 62'
FL	20	Javier Ortega Desio	(substituted on) 49'
SH	21	Martín Landajo	(substituted on) 55'
FH	22	Santiago González Iglesias	(substituted on) 68'
FB	23	Lucas González Amorosino	(substituted on) 55'
Coach:
(Argentina) Daniel Hourcade

Touch judges:
Angus Gardner (Australia)
Stuart Berry (South Africa)
Television match official:
George Ayoub (Australia)

Notes:

- Waisake Naholo and Codie Taylor made their international debuts for New Zealand.

18 July 2015
20:05 AEST (UTC+10)

Australia	24–20	South Africa (1 BP)
Try: Ashley-Cooper 32' c Hooper 73' c Kuridrani 80' c Con: Cooper (2/2) 33', 74'; Giteau (1/1) 80'; Pen: Cooper (1/3) 54'	Report	Try: Etzebeth 37' c Kriel 44' c Con: Pollard (2/2) 39', 45'; Pen: Pollard (2/3) 15', 25'

Lang Park, Brisbane
Attendance: 37,633
Referee: Nigel Owens (Wales)

FB	15	Israel Folau
RW	14	Adam Ashley-Cooper
OC	13	Tevita Kuridrani
IC	12	Matt Giteau		67' to 74'
LW	11	Rob Horne	(substituted off) 57'
FH	10	Quade Cooper	(substituted off) 65'	(substituted on) 67'	(substituted off) 74'
SH	9	Will Genia	(substituted off) 40'
N8	8	Scott Higginbotham	(substituted off) 45'
OF	7	Michael Hooper
BF	6	Scott Fardy
RL	5	Rob Simmons
LL	4	Will Skelton	(substituted off) 50'
TP	3	Sekope Kepu	(substituted off) 45'
HK	2	Stephen Moore (c)
LP	1	James Slipper	(substituted off) 65'
Replacements:
HK	16	Tatafu Polota-Nau
PR	17	Scott Sio	(substituted on) 65'
PR	18	Greg Holmes	(substituted on) 45'
LK	19	James Horwill	(substituted on) 50'
FL	20	David Pocock	(substituted on) 45'
SH	21	Nick Phipps	(substituted on) 40'
CE	22	Matt To'omua	(substituted on) 65'
WG	23	Drew Mitchell	(substituted on) 57'
Coach:
(Australia) Michael Cheika

FB	15	Willie le Roux
RW	14	JP Pietersen
OC	13	Jesse Kriel	(substituted off) 67'
IC	12	Damian de Allende
LW	11	Bryan Habana
FH	10	Handré Pollard	(substituted off) 67'
SH	9	Ruan Pienaar	(substituted off) 67'
N8	8	Schalk Burger
OF	7	Marcell Coetzee			(substituted off) 69'
BF	6	Francois Louw	28' to 40'
RL	5	Victor Matfield (c)	(substituted off) 17'
LL	4	Eben Etzebeth
TP	3	Jannie du Plessis	(substituted off) 13'	(substituted on) 17'	(substituted off) 47'
HK	2	Bismarck du Plessis	(substituted off) 49'
LP	1	Tendai Mtawarira	(substituted off) 49'
Replacements:
HK	16	Adriaan Strauss	(substituted on) 49'
PR	17	Heinke van der Merwe	(substituted on) 49'
PR	18	Frans Malherbe	(substituted on) 13'	(substituted off) 17'	(substituted on) 47'
LK	19	Lood de Jager	(substituted on) 17'
FL	20	Oupa Mohojé	(substituted on) 28'	(substituted off) 40'	(substituted on) 69'
SH	21	Cobus Reinach	(substituted on) 67'
FH	22	Pat Lambie	(substituted on) 67'
WG	23	Lwazi Mvovo	(substituted on) 67'
Coach:
(South Africa) Heyneke Meyer

Man of the Match:
Michael Hooper (Australia)

Touch judges:
Glen Jackson (New Zealand)
Mike Fraser (New Zealand)
Television match official:
Ben Skeen (New Zealand)

Notes:

- Jesse Kriel made his international debut for South Africa.
- Matt Giteau, being named in the starting XV, became the first overseas based player to play for the Wallabies, by virtue of their new selection policy. Drew Mitchell also based overseas, played off the bench.
- Australia won the Mandela Challenge Plate for the first time since 2012.
- Australia earned their first ever opening fixture of the Rugby Championship.

=== Week 2 ===
25 July 2015
17:05 SAST (UTC+02)

(1 BP) South Africa	20–27	New Zealand
Try: Le Roux 9' c Kriel 45' c Con: Pollard (2/2) 10', 46'; Pen: Pollard (2/3) 20', 56'	Report	Try: B. Smith 39' c Coles 48' c McCaw 73' c Con: Sopoaga (3/3) 40', 49', 74'; Pen: Sopoaga (2/4) 2', 80'

Ellis Park Stadium, Johannesburg
Attendance: 62,000
Referee: Jérôme Garcès (France)

FB	15	Willie le Roux			(substituted off) 62'
RW	14	Cornal Hendricks
OC	13	Jesse Kriel	(substituted off) 77'
IC	12	Damian de Allende
LW	11	Bryan Habana
FH	10	Handré Pollard	39' to 40'
SH	9	Ruan Pienaar	(substituted off) 75'
N8	8	Schalk Burger (c)
OF	7	Francois Louw	(substituted off) 41'
BF	6	Heinrich Brüssow
RL	5	Lood de Jager	(substituted off) 59'
LL	4	Eben Etzebeth
TP	3	Jannie du Plessis	(substituted off) 40'
HK	2	Bismarck du Plessis
LP	1	Tendai Mtawarira	(substituted off) 69'
Replacements:
HK	16	Adriaan Strauss	(substituted on) 69'
PR	17	Trevor Nyakane		(substituted on) 61'
PR	18	Vincent Koch	(substituted on) 40'	(substituted off) 61'
LK	19	Flip van der Merwe	(substituted on) 59'
N8	20	Warren Whiteley	(substituted on) 41'
SH	21	Cobus Reinach	(substituted on) 75'
FH	22	Pat Lambie	(substituted on) 39'	(substituted off) 40'	(substituted on) 62'
CE	23	Lionel Mapoe	(substituted on) 77'
Coach:
(South Africa) Heyneke Meyer

FB	15	Israel Dagg		(substituted off) 51'
RW	14	Ben Smith
OC	13	Conrad Smith
IC	12	Ma'a Nonu		(substituted off) 46'
LW	11	Charles Piutau
FH	10	Lima Sopoaga
SH	9	Aaron Smith		(substituted off) 64'
N8	8	Kieran Read
OF	7	Richie McCaw (c)
BF	6	Liam Messam		(substituted off) 56'
RL	5	James Broadhurst		(substituted off) 40'
LL	4	Brodie Retallick
TP	3	Owen Franks		(substituted off) 56'
HK	2	Dane Coles		(substituted off) 62'
LP	1	Tony Woodcock		(substituted off) 49'
Replacements:
HK	16	Codie Taylor		(substituted on) 62'
PR	17	Wyatt Crockett		(substituted on) 49'
PR	18	Ben Franks		(substituted on) 56'
LK	19	Sam Whitelock	(yellow card) 59' to 69'	(substituted on) 40'
N8	20	Victor Vito		(substituted on) 56'
SH	21	TJ Perenara		(substituted on) 64'
FH	22	Beauden Barrett		(substituted on) 51'
CE	23	Malakai Fekitoa		(substituted on) 46'
Coach:
(New Zealand) Steve Hansen

Man of the Match:
Charles Piutau (New Zealand)

Touch judges:
Romain Poite (France)
Leighton Hodges (Wales)
Television match official:
Graham Hughes (England)

Notes:

- Vincent Koch and Lionel Mapoe made their international debuts for South Africa.
- James Broadhurst and Lima Sopoaga made their international debuts for New Zealand.
- New Zealand retain the Freedom Cup.
- With this loss, South Africa lose three consecutive matches for the first time since 2011.

25 July 2015
19:40 ART (UTC-03)

Argentina	9–34	Australia (1 BP)
Pen: Sánchez (3/3) 29', 40', 57'	Report	Try: Tomane 16' m Mumm 58' m Kuridrani 77' c Ashley-Cooper 78' m Con: Foley (1/4) 77'; Pen: Foley (4/5) 39', 42', 53', 69'

Estadio Malvinas Argentinas, Mendoza
Attendance: 25,000
Referee: Jaco Peyper (South Africa)

FB	15	Santiago Cordero
RW	14	Gonzalo Camacho	(substituted off) 56'
OC	13	Matías Moroni
IC	12	Juan Pablo Socino
LW	11	Juan Imhoff
FH	10	Nicolás Sánchez	(substituted off) 66'
SH	9	Martín Landajo	(substituted off) 61'
N8	8	Facundo Isa	(substituted off) 63'
OF	7	Juan Martín Fernández Lobbe
BF	6	Javier Ortega Desio
RL	5	Tomás Lavanini	(substituted off) 66'
LL	4	Manuel Carizza
TP	3	Ramiro Herrera	(substituted off) 52'
HK	2	Agustín Creevy (c)	(substituted off) 72'
LP	1	Marcos Ayerza	(substituted off) 67'
Replacements:
HK	16	Santiago Iglesias Valdez	(substituted on) 72'
PR	17	Nahuel Tetaz Chaparro	(substituted on) 52'
PR	18	Matías Díaz	(substituted on) 67'
LK	19	Matías Alemanno	(substituted on) 66'
N8	20	Leonardo Senatore	(substituted on) 63'
SH	21	Tomás Cubelli	(substituted on) 61'
FH	22	Santiago González Iglesias	(substituted on) 66'
FB	23	Lucas González Amorosino	(substituted on) 56'
Coach:
(Argentina) Daniel Hourcade

FB	15	Israel Folau
RW	14	Adam Ashley-Cooper
OC	13	Tevita Kuridrani
IC	12	Matt To'omua		(substituted off) 9'
LW	11	Joe Tomane
FH	10	Bernard Foley
SH	9	Nick Phipps		(substituted off) 75'
N8	8	Ben McCalman		(substituted off) 48'
OF	7	David Pocock
BF	6	Scott Fardy		(substituted off) 53'
RL	5	Rob Simmons
LL	4	Will Skelton
TP	3	Greg Holmes		(substituted off) 55'
HK	2	Stephen Moore (c)		(substituted off) 66'
LP	1	James Slipper		(substituted off) 39'
Replacements:
HK	16	Tatafu Polota-Nau		(substituted on) 66'
PR	17	Scott Sio		(substituted on) 39'
PR	18	Sekope Kepu		(substituted on) 55'
LK	19	Dean Mumm		(substituted on) 53'
FL	20	Michael Hooper		(substituted on) 48'
SH	21	Nic White		(substituted on) 75'
FH	22	Quade Cooper	(yellow card) 65' to 75'	(substituted on) 9'	(substituted off) 75'
CE	23	Kurtley Beale			(substituted on) 75'
Coach:
(Australia) Michael Cheika

Man of the Match:
David Pocock (Australia)

Touch judges:
Chris Pollock (New Zealand)
Stuart Berry (South Africa)
Television match official:
Shaun Veldsman (South Africa)

Notes:

- Juan Pablo Socino made his international debut for Argentina.
- Kurtley Beale earned his 50th test cap for Australia.
- Australia win the Puma Trophy.
- With this win, Australia went top of the Rugby Championship table for the first ever time.

=== Week 3 ===
8 August 2015
20:05 AEST (UTC+10)

Australia	27–19	New Zealand
Try: Kepu 43' c Ashley-Cooper 60' c White 71' c Con: Giteau (2/2) 44', 61'; White (1/1) 73'; Pen: Giteau (1/2) 26'; White (1/1) 68'	Report	Try: Milner-Skudder (2) 55' m, 64' m Pen: Carter (3/3) 8', 29', 50'

Stadium Australia, Sydney
Attendance: 73,824
Referee: Wayne Barnes (England)

FB	15	Israel Folau
RW	14	Adam Ashley-Cooper
OC	13	Tevita Kuridrani
IC	12	Matt Giteau		(substituted off) 65'
LW	11	Drew Mitchell
FH	10	Bernard Foley		(substituted off) 50'
SH	9	Nick Phipps	(yellow card) 53' to 63'	(substituted off) 65'
N8	8	David Pocock		61' to 68'
OF	7	Michael Hooper		(substituted off) 15'	(substituted on) 18'
BF	6	Scott Fardy				(substituted off) 76'
RL	5	James Horwill		(substituted off) 58'
LL	4	Dean Mumm
TP	3	Sekope Kepu	(yellow card) 7' to 17'			(substituted off) 54'
HK	2	Stephen Moore (c)		(substituted off) 68'
LP	1	Scott Sio		(substituted off) 58'
Replacements:
HK	16	Tatafu Polota-Nau		(substituted on) 68'
PR	17	James Slipper		(substituted on) 58'
PR	18	Greg Holmes		(substituted on) 15'	(substituted off) 18'	(substituted on) 54'
LK	19	Will Skelton		(substituted on) 58'
N8	20	Ben McCalman		(substituted on) 61'	(substituted off) 68'	(substituted on) 76'
SH	21	Nic White		(substituted on) 65'
CE	22	Matt To'omua		(substituted on) 50'
CE	23	Kurtley Beale		(substituted on) 65'
Coach:
(Australia) Michael Cheika

FB	15	Ben Smith		(substituted off) 61'
RW	14	Nehe Milner-Skudder
OC	13	Conrad Smith
IC	12	Sonny Bill Williams		(substituted off) 54'
LW	11	Julian Savea
FH	10	Dan Carter
SH	9	Aaron Smith	(yellow card) 42' to 52'	(substituted off) 77'
N8	8	Kieran Read
OF	7	Richie McCaw (c)
BF	6	Jerome Kaino		(substituted off) 73'
RL	5	Luke Romano		(substituted off) 54'
LL	4	Brodie Retallick
TP	3	Owen Franks		(substituted off) 44'
HK	2	Dane Coles		(substituted off) 68'
LP	1	Tony Woodcock		(substituted off) 73'
Replacements:
HK	16	Codie Taylor		(substituted on) 68'
PR	17	Ben Franks		(substituted on) 73'
PR	18	Nepo Laulala		(substituted on) 44'
LK	19	Sam Whitelock		(substituted on) 54'
FL	20	Sam Cane		(substituted on) 73'
SH	21	TJ Perenara		(substituted on) 77'
FH	22	Beauden Barrett		(substituted on) 61'
CE	23	Malakai Fekitoa		(substituted on) 54'
Coach:
(New Zealand) Steve Hansen

Man of the Match:
Michael Hooper (Australia)

Touch judges:
Nigel Owens (Wales)
Federico Anselmi (Argentina)
Television match official:
Shaun Veldsman (South Africa)

Notes:

- Nehe Milner-Skudder made his international debut for New Zealand.
- Richie McCaw equalled Brian O'Driscoll's 141-cap record, as the most capped rugby player ever.
- Australia beat New Zealand for the first time since their 25–20 win in 2011, while earning their first win at Stadium Australia since 2011.
- New Zealand lose their first ever match in the Rugby Championship without claiming a losing bonus point; their last was during the 2011 Tri Nations Series.

8 August 2015
17:05 SAST (UTC+02)

South Africa	25–37	Argentina (1 BP)
Try: De Jager 35' c Le Roux 48' c Habana 78' m Con: Pollard (2/2) 36', 49'; Pen: Pollard (2/2) 9', 28'	Report	Try: Bosch 1' c Imhoff (3) 22' c, 30' c, 41' c Con: Hernández (4/4) 2', 23', 32', 42'; Pen: Hernández (1/3) 37'; Bosch (1/1) 39'; Drop: Bosch (1/1) 62'

Kings Park Stadium, Durban
Attendance: 27,447
Referee: Romain Poite (France)

FB	15	Willie le Roux
RW	14	Jesse Kriel
OC	13	Jean de Villiers (c)
IC	12	Damian de Allende
LW	11	Bryan Habana
FH	10	Handré Pollard	(substituted off) 65'
SH	9	Ruan Pienaar	(substituted off) 59'
N8	8	Schalk Burger
OF	7	Marcell Coetzee	(substituted off) 65'
BF	6	Heinrich Brüssow	(substituted off) 62'
RL	5	Lood de Jager
LL	4	Eben Etzebeth	(substituted off) 61'
TP	3	Vincent Koch	(substituted off) 40'
HK	2	Bismarck du Plessis	(substituted off) 56'
LP	1	Tendai Mtawarira	(substituted off) 61'
Replacements:
HK	16	Adriaan Strauss	(substituted on) 56'
PR	17	Trevor Nyakane	(substituted on) 61'
PR	18	Marcel van der Merwe	(substituted on) 40'
LK	19	Pieter-Steph du Toit	(substituted on) 61'
FL	20	Siya Kolisi	(substituted on) 62'
SH	21	Cobus Reinach	(substituted on) 59'
FH	22	Pat Lambie	(substituted on) 65'
WG	23	Lwazi Mvovo	(substituted on) 65'
Coach:
(South Africa) Heyneke Meyer

FB	15	Joaquín Tuculet
RW	14	Horacio Agulla
OC	13	Marcelo Bosch
IC	12	Jerónimo de la Fuente		(substituted off) 55'
LW	11	Juan Imhoff
FH	10	Juan Martín Hernández		(substituted off) 62'
SH	9	Tomás Cubelli		(substituted off) 66'
N8	8	Leonardo Senatore
OF	7	Juan Manuel Leguizamón		(substituted off) 65'
BF	6	Pablo Matera	(yellow card) 75' to 80'
RL	5	Tomás Lavanini
LL	4	Guido Petti		(substituted off) 56'
TP	3	Nahuel Tetaz Chaparro		(substituted off) 70'
HK	2	Agustín Creevy (c)		(substituted off) 67'
LP	1	Marcos Ayerza		(substituted off) 52'
Replacements:
HK	16	Julián Montoya		(substituted on) 67'
PR	17	Lucas Noguera Paz		(substituted on) 52'
PR	18	Matías Díaz		(substituted on) 70'
LK	19	Matías Alemanno		(substituted on) 56'
FL	20	Tomás Lezana		(substituted on) 65'
SH	21	Martín Landajo		(substituted on) 66'
FH	22	Santiago González Iglesias		(substituted on) 55'
FB	23	Lucas González Amorosino		(substituted on) 62'
Coach:
(Argentina) Daniel Hourcade

Man of the Match:
Juan Imhoff (Argentina)

Touch judges:
JP Doyle (England)
Marius Mitrea (Italy)
Television match official:
Ben Skeen (New Zealand)

Notes:

- This was Argentina's first ever win over South Africa.
- Argentina claim their first ever bonus point victory, and their first away victory, since joining the Rugby Championship in 2012.
- With this loss, South Africa lost consecutive home Test matches for the first time since 2010–11; and lost four consecutive Test matches for the first time since 2010.
- Juan Imhoff scored Argentina's first hat-trick of tries in the Rugby Championship; and the first hat-trick by any player in the tournament since Israel Folau scored three for Australia against Argentina in 2013.

== Squads ==
=== Summary ===
Nation	Match venues			Head coach	Captain
Nation	Name	City	Capacity	Head coach	Captain
Argentina	Estadio Malvinas Argentinas	Mendoza	40,268	(Argentina) Daniel Hourcade	Agustín Creevy
Australia	Stadium Australia	Sydney	84,000	(Australia) Michael Cheika	Stephen Moore
Australia	Lang Park	Brisbane	53,000	(Australia) Michael Cheika	Stephen Moore
New Zealand	Rugby League Park	Christchurch	18,000	(New Zealand) Steve Hansen	Richie McCaw
South Africa	Ellis Park Stadium	Johannesburg	62,567	(South Africa) Heyneke Meyer	Victor Matfield; Schalk Burger; Jean de Villiers
South Africa	Kings Park Stadium	Durban	52,000	(South Africa) Heyneke Meyer	Victor Matfield; Schalk Burger; Jean de Villiers

Note: Ages, caps and domestic side are of 17 July 2015 – the starting date of the tournament.

=== Argentina ===
Argentina's 36-man squad for the Championship, was announced on 26 June 2015.

On 29 March, Juan Pablo Orlandi was called up to the squad to replace the injured Ramiro Herrera.

Note: Flags indicate national union for the club/province as defined by World Rugby.

Player	Position	Date of birth (age)	Caps	Club/province
Agustín Creevy (c)	Hooker	15 March 1985 (aged 30)	36	(Argentina) UAR
Santiago Iglesias Valdez	Hooker	26 May 1993 (aged 22)	10	(Argentina) UAR
Julián Montoya	Hooker	29 October 1993 (aged 21)	6	(Argentina) UAR
Marcos Ayerza	Prop	12 January 1983 (aged 32)	57	(England) Leicester Tigers
Matías Díaz	Prop	16 March 1993 (aged 22)	9	(Argentina) UAR
Juan Figallo	Prop	25 March 1988 (aged 27)	22	(England) Saracens
Ramiro Herrera	Prop	14 February 1989 (aged 26)	11	(Argentina) UAR
Lucas Noguera Paz	Prop	10 May 1993 (aged 22)	13	(Argentina) UAR
Juan Pablo Orlandi	Prop	20 June 1983 (aged 32)	15	Unattached
Nahuel Tetaz Chaparro	Prop	6 November 1989 (aged 25)	16	(Argentina) UAR
Matías Alemanno	Lock	5 December 1991 (aged 23)	11	(Argentina) UAR
Manuel Carizza	Lock	23 August 1984 (aged 30)	44	(France) Racing 92
Tomás Lavanini	Lock	22 January 1993 (aged 22)	18	Unattached
Guido Petti	Lock	17 November 1994 (aged 20)	4	(Argentina) UAR
Juan Martín Fernández Lobbe	Flanker	19 November 1981 (aged 33)	61	(France) Toulon
Juan Manuel Leguizamón	Flanker	6 June 1983 (aged 32)	59	Unattached
Tomás Lezana	Flanker	16 February 1994 (aged 21)	3	(Argentina) UAR
Pablo Matera	Flanker	18 July 1993 (aged 21)	14	(Argentina) UAR
Javier Ortega Desio	Flanker	14 June 1990 (aged 25)	14	(Argentina) UAR
Facundo Isa	Number 8	21 September 1993 (aged 21)	5	(Argentina) UAR
Benjamín Macome	Number 8	10 January 1986 (aged 29)	21	(France) Bayonne
Leonardo Senatore	Number 8	13 May 1984 (aged 31)	29	Unattached
Tomás Cubelli	Scrum-half	12 June 1989 (aged 26)	34	(Argentina) UAR
Felipe Ezcurra	Scrum-half	15 April 1993 (aged 22)	2	(Argentina) Hindú
Martín Landajo	Scrum-half	14 June 1988 (aged 27)	42	(Argentina) UAR
Santiago González Iglesias	Fly-half	16 June 1988 (aged 27)	14	(Argentina) UAR
Nicolás Sánchez	Fly-half	26 October 1988 (aged 26)	30	(Argentina) UAR
Juan Pablo Socino	Fly-half	30 May 1988 (aged 27)	0	(England) Newcastle Falcons
Marcelo Bosch	Centre	7 January 1984 (aged 31)	33	(England) Saracens
Jerónimo de la Fuente	Centre	24 February 1991 (aged 24)	11	(Argentina) UAR
Juan Martín Hernández	Centre	7 August 1982 (aged 32)	52	Unattached
Matías Moroni	Centre	29 March 1991 (aged 24)	2	(Argentina) UAR
Horacio Agulla	Wing	22 October 1984 (aged 30)	58	(England) Bath
Gonzalo Camacho	Wing	28 August 1984 (aged 30)	23	(England) Leicester Tigers
Santiago Cordero	Wing	6 December 1993 (aged 21)	9	(Argentina) UAR
Juan Imhoff	Wing	11 May 1988 (aged 27)	26	(France) Racing 92
Lucas González Amorosino	Fullback	2 November 1985 (aged 29)	40	Unattached
Joaquín Tuculet	Fullback	8 August 1989 (aged 25)	20	(Argentina) UAR

=== Australia ===
On 2 July 2015, Michael Cheika named an extended 40-man squad for the 2015 Rugby Championship. The squad included newly eligible players Matt Giteau and Drew Mitchel, both based at Toulon, France, and uncapped Fijian duo Samu Kerevi and Taqele Naiyaravoro who are eligible through residency.

On 5 July, Henry Speight withdrew from the squad due to compassionate leave, and he was replaced with Nick Cummins.

Note: Flags indicate national union for the club/province as defined by World Rugby.

Player	Position	Date of birth (age)	Caps	Club/province
James Hanson	Hooker	15 September 1988 (aged 26)	9	(Australia) Reds
Stephen Moore (c)	Hooker	20 January 1983 (aged 32)	92	(Australia) Brumbies
Tatafu Polota-Nau	Hooker	26 July 1985 (aged 29)	50	(Australia) Waratahs
Tetera Faulkner	Prop	26 July 1988 (aged 26)	2	(Australia) Force
Greg Holmes	Prop	11 June 1983 (aged 32)	13	(Australia) Reds
Sekope Kepu	Prop	5 February 1986 (aged 29)	52	(Australia) Waratahs
Scott Sio	Prop	16 October 1991 (aged 23)	5	(Australia) Brumbies
James Slipper	Prop	6 June 1989 (aged 26)	63	(Australia) Reds
Toby Smith	Prop	10 October 1988 (aged 26)	0	(Australia) Rebels
Rory Arnold	Lock	1 July 1990 (aged 25)	0	(Australia) Brumbies
Dave Dennis	Lock	10 January 1986 (aged 29)	18	(Australia) Waratahs
James Horwill	Lock	29 May 1985 (aged 30)	58	(Australia) Reds
Dean Mumm	Lock	5 March 1984 (aged 31)	33	(Australia) Waratahs
Rob Simmons	Lock	19 April 1989 (aged 26)	50	(Australia) Reds
Will Skelton	Lock	3 May 1992 (aged 23)	8	(Australia) Waratahs
Scott Fardy	Flanker	5 July 1984 (aged 31)	20	(Australia) Brumbies
Michael Hooper	Flanker	29 October 1991 (aged 23)	42	(Australia) Waratahs
Sean McMahon	Flanker	18 June 1994 (aged 21)	3	(Australia) Rebels
David Pocock	Flanker	23 April 1988 (aged 27)	46	(Australia) Brumbies
Scott Higginbotham	Number 8	5 September 1986 (aged 28)	31	(Australia) Rebels
Ben McCalman	Number 8	18 March 1988 (aged 27)	38	(Australia) Force
Wycliff Palu	Number 8	27 July 1982 (aged 32)	54	(Australia) Waratahs
Will Genia	Scrum-half	17 January 1988 (aged 27)	58	(Australia) Reds
Nick Phipps	Scrum-half	9 January 1989 (aged 26)	28	(Australia) Waratahs
Nic White	Scrum-half	13 June 1990 (aged 25)	19	(Australia) Brumbies
Quade Cooper	Fly-half	5 April 1988 (aged 27)	53	(Australia) Reds
Bernard Foley	Fly-half	8 September 1989 (aged 25)	18	(Australia) Waratahs
Kurtley Beale	Centre	6 January 1989 (aged 26)	49	(Australia) Waratahs
Matt Giteau	Centre	29 September 1982 (aged 32)	92	(France) Toulon
Samu Kerevi	Centre	27 September 1993 (aged 21)	0	(Australia) Reds
Tevita Kuridrani	Centre	31 March 1991 (aged 24)	20	(Australia) Brumbies
Christian Lealiifano	Centre	24 September 1987 (aged 27)	16	(Australia) Brumbies
Matt To'omua	Centre	2 January 1990 (aged 25)	21	(Australia) Brumbies
Adam Ashley-Cooper	Wing	27 March 1984 (aged 31)	104	(Australia) Waratahs
Nick Cummins	Wing	5 October 1987 (aged 27)	15	(Australia) Force
Rob Horne	Wing	15 August 1989 (aged 25)	25	(Australia) Waratahs
Drew Mitchell	Wing	26 March 1984 (aged 31)	63	(France) Toulon
Taqele Naiyaravoro	Wing	7 December 1991 (aged 23)	0	(Australia) Waratahs
Henry Speight	Wing	25 March 1988 (aged 27)	2	(Australia) Brumbies
Joe Tomane	Wing	11 February 1990 (aged 25)	14	(Australia) Brumbies
Israel Folau	Fullback	3 April 1989 (aged 26)	29	(Australia) Waratahs

=== New Zealand ===
On 21 June 2015, New Zealand named a 41-man squad for the July 8 clash with Samoa, won by the All Blacks 25–16, the 2015 Rugby Championship and the Bledisloe Cup test on 15 August.

Nepo Laulala and Andrew Ellis are included in the squad as injury cover for Charlie Faumuina and Tawera Kerr-Barlow.

On 2 August, Patrick Osborne was added to the squad ahead the back to back clashes against Australia.

Player	Position	Date of birth (age)	Caps	Club/province
Dane Coles	Hooker	10 December 1986 (aged 28)	27	Hurricanes / Wellington
Hika Elliot	Hooker	22 January 1986 (aged 29)	4	Chiefs / Poverty Bay
Keven Mealamu	Hooker	20 March 1979 (aged 36)	124	Blues / Auckland
Codie Taylor	Hooker	31 March 1991 (aged 24)	0	Crusaders / Canterbury
Wyatt Crockett	Prop	24 January 1983 (aged 32)	37	Crusaders / Canterbury
Charlie Faumuina	Prop	24 December 1986 (aged 28)	27	Blues / Auckland
Ben Franks	Prop	27 March 1984 (aged 31)	41	Hurricanes / Hawke's Bay
Owen Franks	Prop	23 December 1987 (aged 27)	68	Crusaders / Canterbury
Nepo Laulala	Prop	6 November 1991 (aged 23)	1	Crusaders / Canterbury
Joe Moody	Prop	18 September 1988 (aged 26)	8	Crusaders / Canterbury
Tony Woodcock	Prop	27 January 1981 (aged 34)	111	Blues / North Harbour
James Broadhurst	Lock	1 December 1987 (aged 27)	0	Hurricanes / Taranaki
Brodie Retallick	Lock	31 May 1991 (aged 24)	37	Chiefs / Bay of Plenty
Luke Romano	Lock	16 February 1986 (aged 29)	18	Crusaders / Canterbury
Jeremy Thrush	Lock	19 April 1985 (aged 30)	11	Hurricanes / Wellington
Sam Whitelock	Lock	12 October 1988 (aged 26)	63	Crusaders / Canterbury
Sam Cane	Flanker	13 January 1992 (aged 23)	22	Chiefs / Bay of Plenty
Jerome Kaino	Flanker	6 April 1983 (aged 32)	57	Blues / Auckland
Richie McCaw (c)	Flanker	31 December 1980 (aged 34)	138	Crusaders / Canterbury
Liam Messam	Flanker	25 March 1984 (aged 31)	40	Chiefs / Waikato
Matt Todd	Flanker	24 March 1988 (aged 27)	3	Crusaders / Canterbury
Kieran Read	Number 8	26 October 1985 (aged 29)	73	Crusaders / Canterbury
Victor Vito	Number 8	27 March 1987 (aged 28)	26	Hurricanes / Wellington
Andrew Ellis	Half-back	21 February 1984 (aged 31)	27	Crusaders / Canterbury
Tawera Kerr-Barlow	Half-back	15 August 1990 (aged 24)	15	Chiefs / Waikato
TJ Perenara	Half-back	23 January 1992 (aged 23)	11	Hurricanes / Wellington
Aaron Smith	Half-back	21 November 1988 (aged 26)	38	Highlanders / Manawatu
Beauden Barrett	First five-eighth	27 May 1991 (aged 24)	28	Hurricanes / Taranaki
Dan Carter	First five-eighth	5 March 1982 (aged 33)	103	Crusaders / Canterbury
Colin Slade	First five-eighth	10 October 1987 (aged 27)	18	Crusaders / Canterbury
Lima Sopoaga	First five-eighth	3 February 1991 (aged 24)	0	Highlanders / Southland
Ryan Crotty	Centre	23 September 1988 (aged 26)	14	Crusaders / Canterbury
Malakai Fekitoa	Centre	10 May 1992 (aged 23)	8	Highlanders / Auckland
Ma'a Nonu	Centre	21 May 1982 (aged 33)	94	Hurricanes / Wellington
Conrad Smith	Centre	12 October 1981 (aged 33)	85	Hurricanes / Wellington
Sonny Bill Williams	Centre	3 August 1985 (aged 29)	24	Chiefs / Counties Manukau
Cory Jane	Wing	8 February 1983 (aged 32)	53	Hurricanes / Wellington
Waisake Naholo	Wing	8 May 1991 (aged 24)	0	Highlanders / Taranaki
Patrick Osborne	Wing	14 June 1987 (aged 28)	0	Highlanders / Canterbury
Charles Piutau	Wing	31 October 1991 (aged 23)	15	Blues / Auckland
Julian Savea	Wing	7 August 1990 (aged 24)	33	Hurricanes / Wellington
Israel Dagg	Fullback	6 June 1988 (aged 27)	47	Crusaders / Hawke's Bay
Nehe Milner-Skudder	Fullback	15 December 1990 (aged 24)	0	Hurricanes / Manawatu
Ben Smith	Fullback	1 June 1986 (aged 29)	38	Highlanders / Otago

=== South Africa ===
On 12 July 2015, coach Heyneke Meyer named the following 31-man squad for the 2015 Rugby Championship:

On 20 July, Flip van der Merwe was added to the squad as injury cover for the second row. Heinrich Brüssow and Cornal Hendricks were also included in the squad to face New Zealand in their second Rugby Championship match.

On 5 August, Jean de Villiers, Siya Kolisi, Marcel van der Merwe and Pieter-Steph du Toit were added to the squad ahead of the final match against Argentina.

Player	Position	Date of birth (age)	Caps	Club/province
Schalk Brits	Hooker	16 May 1981 (aged 34)	7	(England) Saracens
Bismarck du Plessis ‡	Hooker	22 May 1984 (aged 31)	70	(South Africa) Sharks
Adriaan Strauss ‡	Hooker	18 November 1985 (aged 29)	44	(South Africa) Bulls
Jannie du Plessis ‡	Prop	16 November 1982 (aged 32)	62	(South Africa) Sharks
Vincent Koch	Prop	13 March 1990 (aged 25)	0	(South Africa) Stormers
Frans Malherbe	Prop	14 March 1991 (aged 24)	4	(South Africa) Stormers
Tendai Mtawarira ‡	Prop	1 August 1985 (aged 29)	64	(South Africa) Sharks
Trevor Nyakane	Prop	4 May 1989 (aged 26)	13	(South Africa) Bulls
Heinke van der Merwe	Prop	3 May 1985 (aged 30)	4	(France) Stade Français
Marcel van der Merwe	Prop	24 October 1990 (aged 24)	5	(South Africa) Bulls
Lood de Jager	Lock	17 December 1992 (aged 22)	9	(South Africa) Cheetahs
Pieter-Steph du Toit	Lock	20 August 1992 (age 34)	2	(South Africa) Sharks
Eben Etzebeth ‡	Lock	29 October 1991 (aged 23)	33	(South Africa) Stormers
Victor Matfield (c) ‡	Lock	11 May 1977 (aged 38)	121	(South Africa) Bulls
Flip van der Merwe	Lock	6 June 1985 (aged 30)	35	(South Africa) Bulls
Heinrich Brüssow	Flanker	21 July 1986 (aged 28)	20	(South Africa) Cheetahs
Schalk Burger	Flanker	13 April 1983 (aged 32)	75	(South Africa) Stormers
Siya Kolisi ‡	Flanker	16 June 1991 (aged 24)	10	(South Africa) Stormers
Marcell Coetzee ‡	Flanker	8 May 1991 (aged 24)	26	(South Africa) Sharks
Francois Louw	Flanker	15 June 1985 (aged 30)	34	(England) Bath
Oupa Mohojé	Flanker	3 August 1990 (aged 24)	7	(South Africa) Cheetahs
Warren Whiteley	Number 8	18 September 1987 (aged 27)	2	(South Africa) Lions
Rudy Paige	Scrum-half	2 August 1989 (aged 25)	0	(South Africa) Bulls
Ruan Pienaar	Scrum-half	10 March 1984 (aged 31)	80	(Ireland) Ulster
Cobus Reinach	Scrum-half	7 February 1990 (aged 25)	6	(South Africa) Sharks
Handré Pollard	Fly-half	11 March 1994 (aged 21)	9	(South Africa) Bulls
Pat Lambie ‡	Fly-half	17 October 1990 (aged 24)	40	(South Africa) Sharks
Morné Steyn	Fly-half	11 July 1984 (aged 31)	59	(France) Stade Français
Damian de Allende ‡	Centre	25 November 1991 (aged 23)	3	(South Africa) Stormers
Jean de Villiers ‡	Centre	24 February 1981 (aged 34)	106	(South Africa) Stormers
Lionel Mapoe	Centre	13 July 1988 (aged 27)	0	(South Africa) Lions
JP Pietersen	Centre	12 July 1986 (aged 29)	59	(South Africa) Sharks
Jan Serfontein ‡	Centre	15 April 1993 (aged 22)	20	(South Africa) Bulls
Bryan Habana	Wing	12 June 1983 (aged 32)	106	(France) Toulon
Cornal Hendricks ‡	Wing	18 April 1988 (aged 27)	11	(South Africa) Cheetahs
Lwazi Mvovo	Wing	3 June 1986 (aged 29)	10	(South Africa) Sharks
Jesse Kriel	Fullback	15 February 1994 (aged 21)	0	(South Africa) Bulls
Willie le Roux ‡	Fullback	18 August 1989 (aged 25)	25	(South Africa) Cheetahs

‡ denotes players who are centrally contracted to the South African Rugby Union.

== Statistics ==
=== Points scorers ===
Pos	Name	Team	Pts
1	Handré Pollard	South Africa	30
2	Dan Carter	New Zealand	23
3	Nicolás Sánchez	Argentina	17
4	Adam Ashley-Cooper	Australia	15
4	Juan Imhoff	Argentina	15
6	Bernard Foley	Australia	14
7	Lima Sopoaga	New Zealand	12
8	Marcelo Bosch	Argentina	11
8	Juan Martín Hernández	Argentina	11
10	Agustín Creevy	Argentina	10
10	Jesse Kriel	South Africa	10
10	Tevita Kuridrani	Australia	10
10	Willie le Roux	South Africa	10
10	Richie McCaw	New Zealand	10
10	Nehe Milner-Skudder	New Zealand	10
10	Nic White	Australia	10
17	Matt Giteau	Australia	9
18	Quade Cooper	Australia	7
19	Dane Coles	New Zealand	5
19	Lood de Jager	South Africa	5
19	Eben Etzebeth	South Africa	5
19	Bryan Habana	South Africa	5
19	Michael Hooper	Australia	5
19	Sekope Kepu	Australia	5
19	Dean Mumm	Australia	5
19	Ma'a Nonu	New Zealand	5
19	Charles Piutau	New Zealand	5
19	Kieran Read	New Zealand	5
19	Ben Smith	New Zealand	5
19	Codie Taylor	New Zealand	5
19	Joe Tomane	Australia	5

=== Try scorers ===
Pos	Name	Team	Tries
1	Adam Ashley-Cooper	Australia	3
1	Juan Imhoff	Argentina	3
3	Agustín Creevy	Argentina	2
3	Willie le Roux	South Africa	2
3	Jesse Kriel	South Africa	2
3	Tevita Kuridrani	Australia	2
3	Richie McCaw	New Zealand	2
3	Nehe Milner-Skudder	New Zealand	2
9	Marcelo Bosch	Argentina	1
9	Dane Coles	New Zealand	1
9	Lood de Jager	South Africa	1
9	Eben Etzebeth	South Africa	1
9	Bryan Habana	South Africa	1
9	Michael Hooper	Australia	1
9	Sekope Kepu	Australia	1
9	Dean Mumm	Australia	1
9	Ma'a Nonu	New Zealand	1
9	Charles Piutau	New Zealand	1
9	Kieran Read	New Zealand	1
9	Ben Smith	New Zealand	1
9	Codie Taylor	New Zealand	1
9	Joe Tomane	Australia	1
9	Nic White	Australia	1

== See also ==
- History of rugby union matches between Argentina and Australia
- History of rugby union matches between Argentina and New Zealand
- History of rugby union matches between Argentina and South Africa
- History of rugby union matches between Australia and South Africa
- History of rugby union matches between Australia and New Zealand
- History of rugby union matches between New Zealand and South Africa
