= Kurtley Beale =

Australian rugby union player (born 1989)

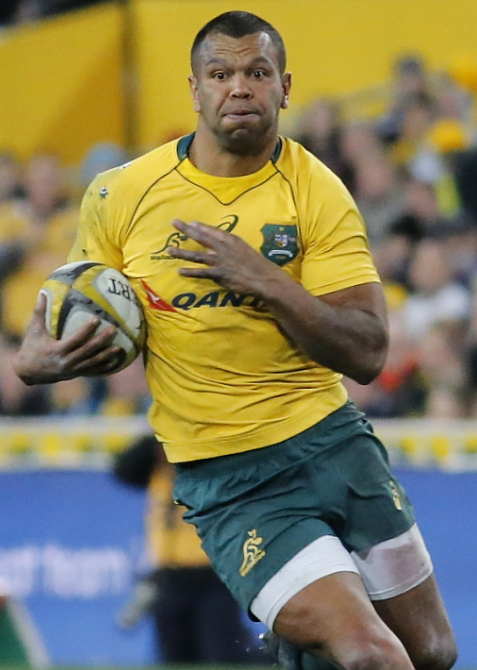
- Beale in August 2017
- Full name: Kurtley James Beale
- Born: 6 January 1989 (age 37) Blacktown, New South Wales, Australia
- Height: 184 cm (6 ft 0 in)
- Weight: 90 kg (198 lb)
- School: St Joseph's College, Hunters Hill

Rugby union career
- Position(s): Full-back, Centre, Fly-half, Wing
- Current team: Western Force
Youth career
- –2006: St Joseph's College
Amateur team(s)
Years	Team	Apps	(Points)
2004–2006	New South Wales Schoolboys		
2013–2015; 2024	Randwick	3	(0)
- Correct as of 16 March 2024
Senior career
Years	Team	Apps	(Points)
2007	Western Sydney Rams	8	(28)
2016–2017	Wasps	17	(25)
2020–2022	Racing 92	42	(38)
- Correct as of 5 February 2022
Super Rugby
Years	Team	Apps	(Points)
2007–2011	Waratahs	58	(341)
2012–2013	Melbourne Rebels	14	(66)
2014–2016	Waratahs	42	(95)
2018–2020	Waratahs	38	(32)
2023–2024	Waratahs	0	(0)
2024–	Western Force	25	(7)
- Correct as of 30 May 2026
International career
Years	Team	Apps	(Points)
2005–2006	Australian Schoolboys	9	
2007	Australia A	3	(10)
2009	Australia U20	3	(22)
2009–2021	Australia	95	(159)
2025	First Nations & Pasifika XV	1	(4)
- Correct as of 22 July 2025
Medal record
Men's rugby union
Representing Australia
Rugby World Cup
Silver medal – second place	2015 England	Squad
Bronze medal – third place	2011 New Zealand	Squad

Kurtley James Beale (born 6 January 1989) is an Australian professional rugby union player who plays for the Western Force in Super Rugby. He has made over 90 national representative appearances in a ten-year playing career at the world-class level. He is of Aboriginal descent, has had a long Super Rugby career with the New South Wales Waratahs and has played for the Melbourne Rebels, the Wasps club in England and Racing 92 in France. Beale usually plays at full-back or centre but can play fly-half or winger. In 2011 Beale received the John Eales Medal, awarded to Australian rugby union's Player of the Year.

== Early life ==
Beale was born in Blacktown, New South Wales, and grew up at Mount Druitt in Western Sydney. In his early years Kurtley played junior rugby league for Western City Tigers, Mt Druitt before converting to rugby union. He attended St Joseph's College, Hunters Hill where he played in that school's first XV in his last three senior years. Beale was selected in the NSW and Australian Schoolboys representative rugby teams between 2004 and 2006. In 2006 Beale captained both the Joeys first XV and the Australian Schoolboys side, and regularly attended training sessions with the NSW Waratahs from the age of 15. He signed with the Waratahs while still only a 16-year-old. At 17, he attended his first Wallabies training camp, on the invitation of coach John Connolly.

== Career ==
Beale first played senior rugby at the Northern Suburbs club alongside then-Waratahs teammates Al Baxter and Sam Norton-Knight. With the launch of the Australian Rugby Championship in 2007, Beale became the starting flyhalf for the Rams. He played every game of the season in which the Rams went on to become minor premiers. One of the top try scorers and leaders in try-assists, he was awarded the 2007 player of the tournament award for the ARC.

In June 2013, Beale was named to play for Randwick while on leave from the Melbourne Rebels following a spell in rehabilitation for alcohol related issues. He had previously played for Randwick against Gordon in 2010.

=== Waratahs ===
==== 2007–2011 ====
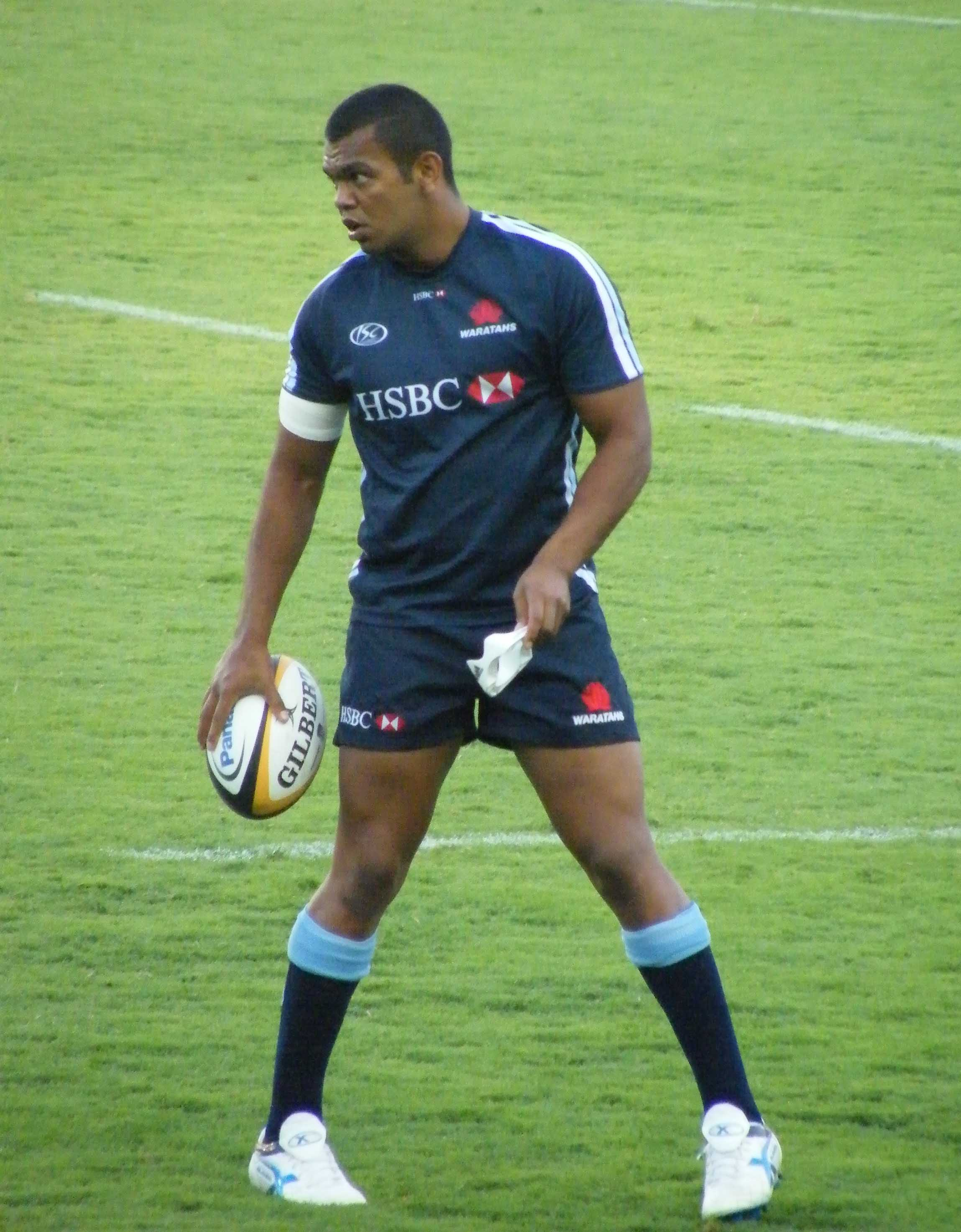
Beale with the Waratahs in 2009

Beale played his first senior game for New South Wales against the ACT in January 2007 for a trial game in Wollongong. After coming on from the bench, he scored the first of his many memorable tries by chipping around the winger and outpacing the fullback to score. The game was won by NSW 12–0. Two weeks later, after again coming off the bench, Beale made a late break to assist in the winning try against the Crusaders.

Coach Ewen McKenzie had stated that Beale would not be rushed into the starting line up and would instead play second fiddle in his debut year behind Daniel Halangahu. However, it was no more than two weeks later that he made his starting debut against the Sharks in South Africa, only to lose 22–9. The following week in only his second start as fly-half, Beale scored one of the most memorable tries of the season by chipping over the first line of defence and stealing the ball out of the fullback's hands to score his first five-pointer in Super 14.

Beale became the Waratahs first choice fly-half for the start of the 2008 Super 14 season. He also assumed the goal-kicking duties from Peter Hewat, but Beale's goal kicking was not seen as one of the team's strong points. His defence also became the subject of criticism after the Round 2 loss to the Chiefs as NSW were forced to shift him to blindside wing in defence in order to shore up the midfield. Beale moved to fullback for the 2010 season.

=== Rebels ===
==== 2012–2013 ====
Beale signed a two-year deal to play for the Melbourne Rebels starting in 2012. His Rebels teammates included fellow test players James O'Connor and Nick Phipps. He began the 2012 season playing at fullback but was switched to fly-half with the imminent departure of Danny Cipriani to England in May of that year. With Beale's help, the Rebels put in one of their best performances since the season began in a narrow loss to the Bulls. The next week the Rebels triumphed over the highly ranked Crusaders, with Beale converting two tries (from 3 attempts) and kicking three penalties. The Rebels narrowly beat the Force the following week in Perth, with Beale once again playing flyhalf.

Rod Macqueen, the former Rebels' coach, said that Beale at number 10 had brought something special to the Rebels and that together with James O'Connor at inside centre, he created the shape of team on the field.

While on tour in South Africa during the 2013 Super Rugby season, Beale punched captain Gareth Delve on a team bus after a match. A post to social media by Cooper Vuna was subsequently re-published on at least one other blog, and Beale and Vuna were sent home early from the tour. Beale agreed to seek counselling for his alcohol related issues. He rejoined the squad and played off the bench against the Chiefs. Beale was again suspended before the Rebels were to play the Blues in Auckland. In July 2013, the Rebels dropped Beale from the squad.

=== Waratahs return: 2014–2016 ===
After two seasons with the Melbourne Rebels, Beale signed a one-year deal with the Waratahs and ARU for 2014. He played at inside centre in every game for the Waratahs during the 2014 Super Rugby season. Beale's combination with Israel Folau at fullback, Adam Ashley-Cooper at outside centre and Bernard Foley at fly-half was instrumental to the team's success. Playing in the final against the Crusaders, he set up the 2 tries to Adam Ashley-Cooper which helped guide the Waratahs to a 33–32 win over the 7-time champions, securing the Super Rugby title.

=== Wasps ===
In May 2016, Beale, agreed to join English club Wasps RFC on a one-year contract with the option for a 12-month extension, for a reported £750,000 per season. However, shortly after announcing the deal, he suffered a potentially season-ending patella tendon injury. He made his Wasps debut in the European Champions Cup in a game against Connacht, scoring a try and receiving a yellow card in the first half. During his time at Wasps he played in 12 Aviva Premiership games scoring 4 tries and 5 European Champions Cup games scoring 1 try. He missed out on appearing the 2016/17 Premiership final after scoring a try (7 mins), but then being injured (46 mins) in the semi-final against Leicester Tigers.

=== Racing 92 ===
==== 2020–2021 ====
Beale joined the Top 14 rugby team, Racing 92 from the Waratahs on a two-year deal, starting from the 2020–21 season onwards. Beale made his debut for Racing against Lyon on 6 September 2020 at Stade de Gerland. After fifty-six minutes, Beale was subbed off, however Racing won the match 23–27. In Beale's third appearance for Racing, he was subbed on in the sixty-fifth minute of the 2019–20 European Rugby Champions Cup Final against the Exeter Chiefs, racing were down 28–27. Racing failed to score and lost (31–27) their third European Rugby Champions Cup Final appearance in five years.

Overall Beale played an important role for Racing in his first season for the club. Beale played twenty-five matches and scored a total of thirty-eight points (seven tries, one penalty goal), almost exclusively playing at full-back.

==== 2021–2022 ====
In his second season for Racing, Beale had less of an attacking impact than his first. In round one of the 2021–22 European Rugby Champions Cup (10 December 2021) against Northampton Saints, Beale made a quick, darting line-break and off-load, leading to a try in the eighth minute of the first half. Later in the match he followed that up with a try assist, helping Racing to a 14–45 win in Franklin's Gardens Stadium.

=== Third Waratahs stint ===
==== 2022–2023 ====
In February 2022, it was confirmed by Rugby Australia (RA) that Beale would return to the New South Wales Waratahs at the conclusion of his stay in Paris with Racing 92 in the 2021–22 Top 14 season. This would allow Beale to play at a fourth World Cup for Australia. Beale would then return to play for the Waratahs beginning at the 2023 Super Rugby Pacific season.

=== Western Force ===
==== 2024 ====
After being on the sideline since returning back home to Australia for 2023, Beale signed for the Perth-based Super Rugby team the Western Force in April 2024 on an injury replacement deal, until the end of the 2024 season. Much of the speculation around Beale's future, following his court battles (2023/24), was centred around a possible code-switch to the National Rugby League (NRL).

== International career ==
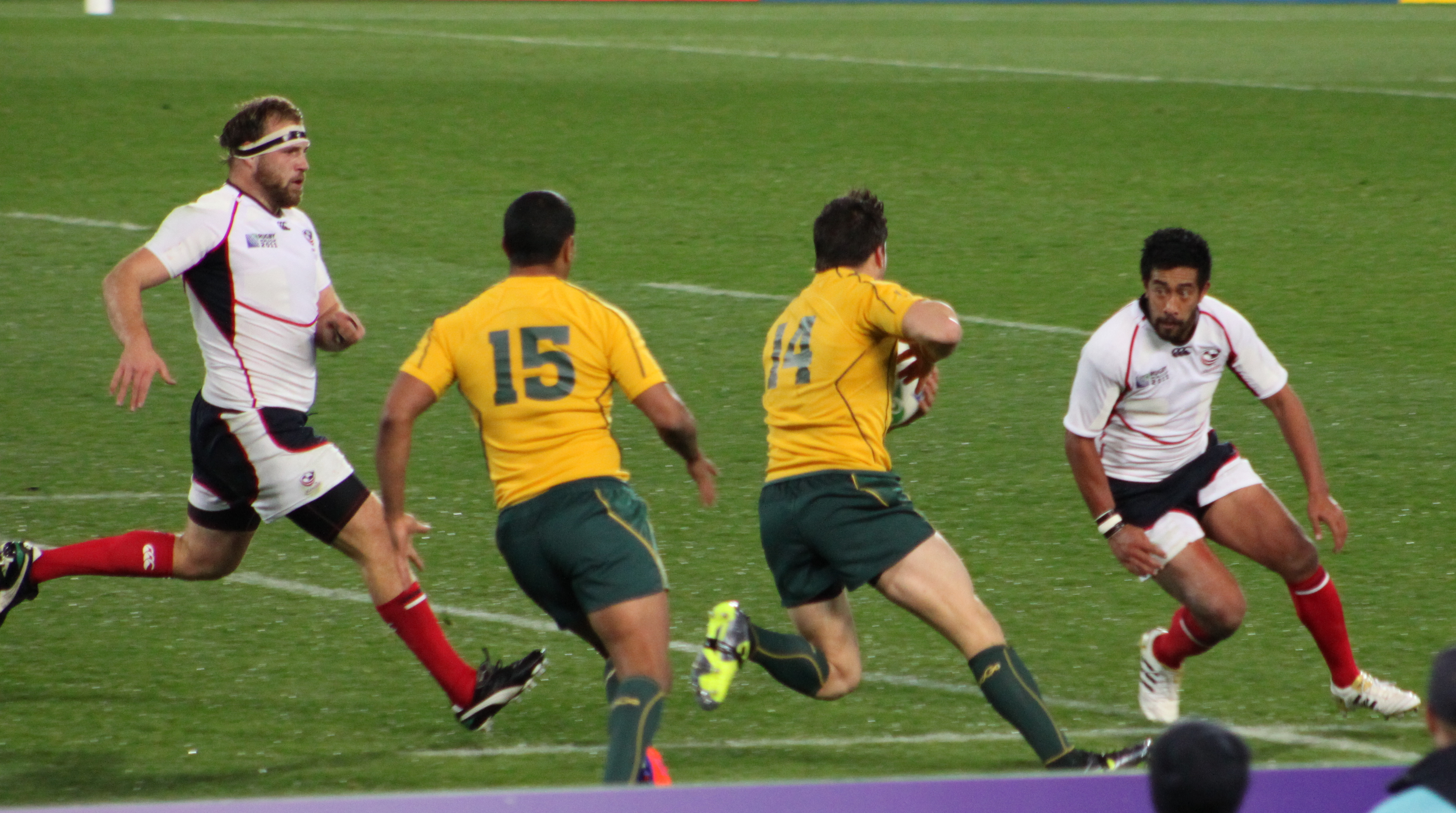
Beale (15) playing for Australia at the 2011 Rugby World Cup.

=== Early career: 2007–2011 ===
Beale made his Australia A debut in the 2007 Pacific Nations Cup. He scored his first try in a 27–15 defeat of Samoa. Soon after, Beale narrowly missed out on being chosen for the Rugby World Cup in 2007, with the selectors opting instead for Berrick Barnes as the backup flyhalf for the Wallabies squad coached by John Connolly.

Beale made his test debut on the 2009 Spring Tour to the Home Nations when he appeared on the wing as a substitute in Australia's 34–12 victory over Wales. He made a number of mid-week match appearances on the tour at fly-half.

2010 was a groundbreaking year for Beale in terms of his international career. He started the test season scoring two tries against Fiji and finished the year with a respectable record of seven tries from 12 tests. Beale was nominated for the IRB International Player of the Year Award, with All Blacks flanker Richie McCaw ultimately winning the award.

In 2011 Beale received the John Eales Medal, awarded to Australia's best rugby player of the year. He was named as part of the Australian squad for the 2011 Rugby World Cup, and was favoured as the starting fullback when fit to play. However, he missed the Wallabies semi-final against the All Blacks due to a hamstring injury suffered in the previous game against South Africa.

=== Later Test career: 2012–2019 ===
Beale played fullback for the third test against Wales in Sydney in 2012. He later played in three tests of the 2012 Rugby Championship, against the All Blacks in Sydney and Auckland, and against the Springboks in Perth. After his poor performances at fullback, he was benched the following week for the game against Argentina played at the Gold Coast.

Following a knee injury to Quade Cooper, coach Robbie Deans shifted him from fullback to fly-half. He played fly-half in the Wallabies loss to the Springboks in Pretoria, and was selected again at fly-half against Argentina in Rosario where he set up a try for Digby Ioane. Beale also played fly-half in the 18-all draw against the All Blacks in the third Bledisloe Cup Test in Brisbane, kicking one penalty goals successfully.

On the 2012 Spring Tour, he played fly-half for all of the Wallabies games. In the final match of the tour against Wales, and in Nathan Sharpe's last test match for Australia, Beale kicked three penalty goals and scored the match-winning try.

Following a period in rehabilitation due to personal and alcohol-related issues in 2013, Beale was selected to play for Australia against the British & Irish Lions. Shortly before full-time in the first test, Beale slipped (and missed) while attempting to kick a penalty that would have won the game for the Wallabies. The Lions won 23–21. He played fullback in the final two tests of the Lions series which the Wallabies lost 2–1. Following the series, he was ruled out for the year after being told by new Wallabies coach Ewen McKenzie (who had replaced Robbie Deans following the Lions Series loss), to have shoulder surgery to fix the shoulder injury he had suffered eight months earlier on the 2012 spring tour.

In 2014, Beale played in all three test matches against France, coming off the bench for the Wallabies. He scored a try in the second half of the first match of the French Series in Brisbane, and set up a try for Michael Hooper in the third Test. Beale's successful season with the Waratahs earned him the Wallabies starting No. 10 role ahead of Bernard Foley against New Zealand in the first two Bledisloe Cup matches. Following 12–all draw and a 20–51 loss to the All Blacks, Beale was benched for the remainder of the 2014 Rugby Championship, with Waratahs team-mate Foley taking over the Wallabies No. 10 role.

Beale played at the 2015 Rugby World Cup, and was instrumental in Australia's bid for a third title. The Wallabies were very successful, making it all the way to the final, but lost to New Zealand 32–17 despite making a brave comeback in the second half. In 2016, Beale failed to make an appearance against England in all three tests on their 2016 tour, due to the fact Beale was playing for Wasps, and because of his failure to reach the 60-cap boundary and 7 years of Super Rugby service required to be chosen from overseas.

Beale made a return for the Wallabies in 2017 by signing for the Waratahs again. He made his comeback against Japan, in a 63–30 rout and also helped to extend the Wallabies' winning streak against Wales. Unfortunately, they experienced defeat at Twickenham, where England dismantled Australia 6–30. Another disappointing loss was against Scotland, however Beale did score in a 24–53 loss.

He then played inside centre against Ireland in 2018, but the Wallabies were shocked in a 2–1 series loss. Australia then lost the Bledisloe Cup to the All Blacks for a 16th consecutive year, with huge defeats in Sydney, Auckland and Oita respectively.

Kurtley was picked for the 2019 Rugby World Cup, in which the Wallabies disappointingly bowed out in the quarter-final against England. Beale then signed with Racing 92 in the Top 14, leaving Super Rugby.

=== Return to Test rugby: 2020–2021 ===
Beale was consistent at Racing 92. He was not picked in 2020 for the Wallabies, despite meeting the Giteau's law criteria. However in 2021 due to an injury of Reece Hodge, Beale was called back up to the Wallabies and named on the bench against Scotland.

== Personal life ==
=== Indigenous heritage ===
Beale has ascribed his Aboriginal identity to being born and raised in Dharug country, with his mother being from the Kamilaroi nation of NSW. Beale grew up playing rugby league and idolised indigenous players such as Greg Inglis and Johnathan Thurston, and has commented to the media about the contrast between rugby union and both NRL and AFL, which have much more integrated indigenous participation in their sports.

Beale has admitted that he needed to work to connect to his heritage. He has stated that he found it difficult to follow his family tree and to find elders. However, Beale ascribed a 2011 visit to the Tiwi Islands to support an initiative by former Australian cricketer Matthew Hayden (The Tiwi College Project) as an "awakening" to learning more about his heritage. Beale has since stated that he is a "proud indigenous man".

Beale unveiled the Wallabies' first ever indigenous jersey in 2017, which also made rugby union the first sport in Australia with an indigenous jersey at the national level. He also introduced the Waratahs' indigenous jersey in 2019. Beale has also stated that his return to Australian rugby was partly motivated by the desire to become a role model for indigenous children.

=== Relationships ===
In 2017, the affair of Kurtley Beale's then-girlfriend with AFL executive Simon Lethlean led to his resignation, which was part of a wider sex scandal at the AFL.

Beale married long-time partner Maddi Bloomberg in 2020.

== Controversy ==
=== Di Patston text controversy ===
On 29 September 2014, it was announced that Kurtley Beale would be investigated by the ARU over an alleged heated argument between Beale and a Wallabies team official, Di Patston, on a 10-hour flight from Johannesburg to São Paulo. The incident led to Patston leaving the tour early, and she resigned from her position shortly afterwards under stress. Despite the incident, head coach McKenzie kept Beale in the squad in Argentina, but did not name him in the match-day 23 for the match against Argentina.

After the team returned to Australia, it was reported that Beale had distributed allegedly offensive texts and images referring to Patston some months earlier, before the first test against France in June. ARU chief executive Bill Pulver called a code of conduct tribunal into the incident. He suspended Beale from playing pending the outcome, meaning that Beale was not in contention for selection for the third Bledisloe test. According to Iain Payten in The Courier-Mail, Patston had agreed to not report the texts to ARU management to give Beale second chance, but that "in the presence of three other Wallabies, Patston spoke to Beale in a Brisbane hotel before the first Test against France and told him she would reveal the contents of the texts if another incident arose". Beale's manager alleged McKenzie knew about these texts back in June, and failed to do anything about it, which McKenzie denied. On 13 October, the texts between Beale and Patston were revealed, with Patston confirming that McKenzie did not know about them in June.

Reports had appeared in the media that some players had become uneasy with Patston's role in the team and how much power McKenzie had given her, and some believed she wasn't qualified for the position she had, particularly following the revelation that Patston had input into the player disciplinary measures that occurred on the 2013 Spring Tour. McKenzie was questioned at a press conference about whether he had lost the confidence of the players, and was even forced to deny being in an extramarital affair with Patston. Michael Hooper and Adam Ashley-Cooper came out and backed Beale to remain with Australia and Rugby Union, while Christian Lealiifano and Quade Cooper joined McKenzie in backing Di Patston. McKenzie announced his resignation as coach of Australia after the final Bledisloe test.

From the outcome of the independent tribunal, Beale admitted to sending an offensive photo and was fined $45,000 for a serious violation of the ARU Code of Conduct. Beale's entire fine went to the Lloyd McDermott Development Team, Australian rugby's indigenous talent unit.

=== Sexual assault allegations ===
In January 2023, Beale was charged with sexual assault of a woman in Sydney, and was found not guilty by a jury on 9 February 2024.

On 20 January 2023, it was revealed that Beale was stopped by the New South Wales Police Force in Kingsford in Sydney's Eastern Suburbs on the same day (Friday, 20 January) following a training session with the New South Wales Waratahs. Beale was taken to a police station in Waverley for questioning over an alleged incident he was involved in with a 28-year-old woman that took place on 17 December 2022 at the Beach Road Hotel in Sydney's Eastern Suburb of Bondi. Beale was refused bail to appear in Parramatta bail court the following day (21 January) after being charged with "two counts of sexually touching another person without consent, inciting another to sexually touch them without consent and sexual intercourse without consent." On 21 January, Beale denied the charges and was granted bail, however he was ordered to surrender his passport, not contact witnesses and to report to police daily.

On the same day, Beale was charged (20 January), Rugby Australia (RA), Beale's employer, had released a statement confirming that Beale has "been suspended from all forms of Rugby with immediate effect pending the conclusion of legal proceedings, as well as Rugby Australia's own investigations."

After Beale's legal proceedings continued in the Waverley Local Court throughout March and April, in which Beale was not required to attend, on 15 June, he entered a not guilty plea to all three charges brought against him (one of the prior charges being withdrawn) after appearing at the Downing Centre Local Court. Beale stated outside court: "I am devastated to be here. The allegation has been falsely [made] against me and the truth will come out." 29 days later Beale again entered a not guilty plea to all three charges brought against him at Downing Centre Local Court. Beale once again plead not guilty in another court appearance late in 2023 (December), before attending court again in January 2024, being informed that a trial before a jury would commence the following week (22 January 2024). Guardian Australia reported on the following day (23 January) that “The trial is expected to sit for the next three weeks with a jury of seven women and five men hearing opening addresses from the prosecution and defence on Tuesday [23 January],” with the prosecutor telling the jury that the “primary issue in the trial will be whether or not the woman consented...”

In early 2024, after a 12-day long trial, on 9 February 2024 a jury deliberated for about an hour before finding Beale not guilty of all charges. Beale, hand-in-hand with wife Maddi, told reporters outside of court that “I’ve always maintained my innocence...My family and I have suffered a terrible year, and I’m so glad that the truth has come out”. His lawyer told the media “Justice was certainly done, and swiftly”.

== Honours ==
=== New South Wales Waratahs ===
- Super Rugby: 2014

=== Australia ===
- Tri Nations / The Rugby Championship: 2011, 2015
- Rugby World Cup third place: 2011, runner-up: 2015
