= Bernard Foley =

Australia international rugby union player (born 1989)

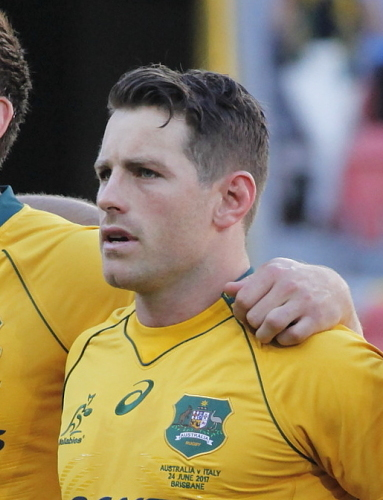
- Foley with Australia in 2017
- Born: Bernard Thomas Foley; 8 September 1989 (age 37) Sydney, New South Wales, Australia
- Height: 177 cm (5 ft 10 in)
- Weight: 89 kg (14 st 0 lb; 196 lb)
- School: St Aloysius' College; Redfield College
- University: University of Sydney

Rugby union career
- Position(s): Fly-half, Centre
- Current team: Waratahs
Amateur team(s)
Years	Team	Apps	(Points)
2012	Sydney University	5	(61)
Senior career
Years	Team	Apps	(Points)
2011–2019	Waratahs	119	(1,092)
2014	Sydney Stars	0	(0)
2015–2016	Ricoh Black Rams	10	(62)
2016	NSW Country Eagles	0	(0)
2020–2026	Kubota Spears	88	(917)
2027–	Waratahs	0	(0)
- Correct as of 23 July 2026
International career
Years	Team	Apps	(Points)
2013–2022	Australia	76	(673)
2023	Australia A	2	(6)
- Correct as of 26 August 2023
National sevens team
Years	Team		Comps
2010–2011	Australia		1
Medal record
Men's rugby union
Representing Australia
Rugby World Cup
Silver medal – second place	2015 England	Squad
Men's rugby sevens
Commonwealth Games
Silver medal – second place	2010 Delhi	Team competition

Bernard Foley (born 8 September 1989), nicknamed the "Iceman" and "Nard", is a professional Australian rugby union player for the Waratahs in the Super Rugby. He most recently played for the Kubota Spears in the Japanese Rugby League One competition. He is known to play fullback, fly-half, and inside centre. Foley has earned the nickname "the iceman" after successful game winning penalty goals in the 2014 Super Rugby final, and the 2015 Rugby World Cup Quarter-final against Scotland.

Foley has had a vast amount of experience in rugby union and played at a variety of differing teams and competitions both domestically and internationally. In his early years Foley played rugby sevens for Australia and competed at the 2010 Commonwealth Games where he received a silver medal in the final of the rugby sevens tournament for his services for the team that took place in Delhi, India. Foley has played for the amateur club team Sydney University since 2012, who compete annually in the state-based competition the Shute Shield. During the 2015–16 Japanese Top League season, after his successful season with the Waratahs just a season beforehand, Foley played for Tokyo-based club Ricoh Black Rams. And recently is playing club rugby in the National Rugby Championship for the New South Wales Country Eagles. He has played for the Australian Super Rugby franchise the New South Wales Waratahs since 2011 and Australia since 2013.

== Career ==
=== Rugby sevens ===
Foley began his career in sevens in 2009. He was a silver medallist with the Australian sevens team at the 2010 Commonwealth Games, and went on to captain the team on the 2010–11 IRB Sevens World Series circuit. He was awarded the Sydney University Male Blue of the Year in 2011. He was also named the 2011 Australian Sevens Player of the Year.

=== Waratahs ===
==== 2014–2015 ====
Foley was the first choice fly-half during the 2014 Waratahs season, having cemented his position in the 2012–13 seasons, and only having to compete with two new players, 19-year-old Dave Horwitz, 23-year-old Ben Volavola and edging out former number one fly-half, Kurtley Beale.

Foley opened his 2014 campaign off in round 2 – round 1 was played by the South African conference – by kicking five conversions and one penalty for a combined score of thirteen points. Helping the Waratahs to a smooth six-try bonus point victory (43–21) over the Perth-based Western Force at Allianz Stadium, Sydney.

On the following Saturday, 1 March 2014, Foley played at home against conference rivals, the Queensland Reds. Kicking three conversions and two penalties (12 points), with the Waratahs having won two from two Australian Conference games both at home. Between rounds 5 and 11 Foley scored one try, ten conversions, and sixteen penalty goals (73 points) against the Brumbies, Rebels, Sharks, Stormers, Force, Bulls and the Blues. After eleven rounds the Waratahs were 5–4, with Bernard Foley scoring a total of 98 points.

Following the balanced win loss ratio the Waratahs had before 12, the Waratahs finished the remaining seven games of the regular season unbeaten, with Foley scoring 110 points. On 26 July 2014, the Waratahs played the Brumbies at Allianz Stadium, Sydney, in the semi-final. Foley kicked one conversion and three penalty goals (11 points), and the Waratahs ran out 26 to 8 winners to host their first ever Super Rugby final. On 2 August 2014, the Waratahs played New Zealand team the Crusaders. In the seventy-ninth minute of the 2014 Super Rugby Final, Foley kicked a 45-metre penalty goal to win the game 33–32 in front of 61,823. Bernard Foley scored a total of 252 points in the 2014 Super Rugby season.

2015 was an unsuccessful season compared with 2014. However, Foley managed five tries in 2015, one short of his successive six the season prior. Foley scored a total of 187 points with the Waratahs, winning the Australian conference before going down to the Highlanders in the semi-finals.

==== 2015–2016 ====
In July 2015, Foley signed a three-year flexible contract with the Australian Rugby Union (ARU). The deal allowed him to play up to two seasons in Japan's Top League competition while still being contracted to play for the Waratahs and Australia, beginning in November 2015, 13 days after the Rugby World Cup. Foley became the first player to sign such a deal, and was seen as a move by the ARU to ease the player exodus from Australia after the Rugby World Cup. It was revealed earlier in the year that Foley was set to join the Ricoh Black Rams in Tokyo.

In May 2016, after concluding one season with the Black Rams, which saw the team finish with one win the entire season, Foley declined a second season and returned to the Waratahs for their 2016 season. Foley played ten games and scored two tries while in Japan.

==== 2016–2017 ====
The 2016 season was another unsuccessful season for both Foley and the Waratahs. Foley only registered 1 try, 15 penalty goals and 35 conversions (120 points). The Waratahs finished second in the Australian conference, sixth in the Australasian conference and tenth overall.

2017 was one of the most unsuccessful seasons in Australian Super Rugby history, which also took a toll on both Foley's success on the field and the New South Wales Waratahs. Foley managed to score 3 tries, 12 penalty goals and 31 conversions (113 points) in 2017. The Waratahs finished second last (4th) in the Australian conference, 9th in the Australasian conference, and 16th overall with only the Japanese team the Sunwolves and the Rebels finishing with less points.

==== 2018–2019 ====
Foley had an exciting 2018 season following two very disappointing years in 2016 and 2017. Foley played a fundamental role for the Waratahs in 2018, similar to his role in the Waratahs' 2014 campaign.

Foley started off the 2018 campaign on 24 February 2018 against South African team the Stormers. Foley kicked three conversions and two penalty goals for a total score of fourteen points in a 34–17 victory at home. In round 3 of the 2018 Super Rugby season, Foley kicked one penalty goal and three conversions, including a seventy-ninth-minute penalty goal to level the score, in a 24–24 draw with the Sharks of Durban at Kings Park Stadium. Foley had successfully converted ten kicks in a row following this match. The next match Foley converted four of four kicks, including two in the eightieth-minute, in an away match in Buenos Aires. Losing to the Jaguares by ten points.

The Waratahs' first game against an Australian conference team was in round 5 at home against the Rebels. Foley scored twenty-one points from his boot, kicking six conversions and three penalty goals for a twenty-four point victory. Foley played in round 7 against Waratahs' rivals, the Brumbies on 31 March. Kicking four penalty goals and one conversion to beat the Brumbies by a converted try, 17–24. The following round Foley scored fifteen points after he kicked one penalty goal and six conversions against the Sunwolves in Tokyo. The Waratahs played Australian conference rivals the Queensland Reds at the Sydney Cricket Ground in round 9. Defeating them 37–16, with Foley scoring more points individually than the opposing team.

In rounds 10, 12 and 13 Foley scored only fifteen points. Foley kicked six conversions and one penalty goal between those rounds. In round 14 Foley converted four of the six tries scored against the Highlanders and kicked one penalty goal to score eleven points in a 41–12 victory over the New Zealand side at home. Leading towards the Super Rugby finals, the Waratahs won three and lost two with Foley scoring fifty seven points. Kicking twenty-four conversions, five penalty goals and scoring one try in the process. In the Super Rugby Qualifying final, Foley played an important role in the Waratahs' hopes of winning. Foley kicked two penalty goals before the tenth minute before the Highlanders scored two converted tries and also had three penalty goals to add. Losing 6–23 at half-time, Foley went on to score two tries, which he converted, before the end of the game. Foley scored a season game high of twenty-five points. The Waratahs won 30–23 at home. Following the superb performance at home the week before, Foley only had six points to his name in the Semi-final against the Lions. The Waratahs lost 44–26 to finish the 2018 season. Foley finished the season confidently as he finished top scorer in the competition with 223 points.

Foley started the 2019 season in round 1 against the Hurricanes at Brookvale Oval, Sydney. Foley scored a conversion kick in the 44th minute, after a try from Waratahs centre Curtis Rona, and four penalty goals in the 3rd, 12th, 16th and 40th minute. However, Foley missed a penalty goal late in the game. The Waratahs lost 19–20. Round 2, the Waratahs played against the Sunwolves in Tokyo. Foley kicked two conversions, missing two in a windy match. The Waratahs won by one point (30–31). After a round 3 bye, Foley played against rivals the Queensland Reds at the Sydney Cricket Ground, Sydney. Foley kicked three penalty goals and converted two out of three tries scored in an eleven-point victory.

=== Kubota Spears ===
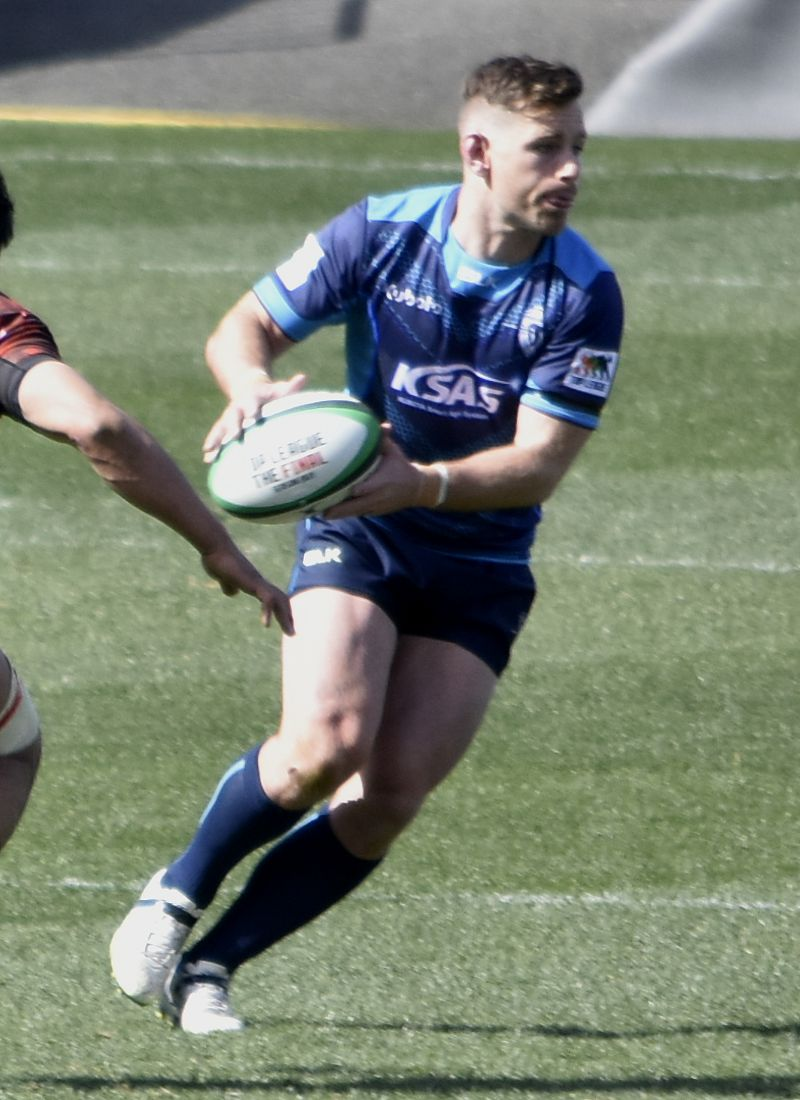
Foley with Kubota.

It was confirmed by the Waratahs that Foley would be leaving the club to stay in Japan post World Cup to play club rugby with the Kubota Spears. This was Foley's second spell in Japan, previously playing for the Ricoh Black Rams in 2015/16.

=== Return to the Waratahs: 2027 ===
In April 2026, The Sydney Morning Herald reported that both Foley and former Wallaby James O'Connor were considering a return home in 2027 to play for Australia in time for the 2027 Rugby World Cup on home soil. In May 2026, Foley was reportedly a major target of the Waratahs for their 2027 season after an exodus of playmakers throughout 2025 and 2026. By July 2026, Foley's former Waratahs and Wallabies teammate Nick Phipps had become a player the Waratahs were keen to sign. Both players had finished playing in the Japan Rugby League One.

On 17 July 2026, Foley was confirmed to have signed a one-year deal to return to the Waratahs ahead of their 2027 season. In August, Foley was formally announced as the Waratah's latest signing alongside former teammate Nick Phipps.

== International career ==
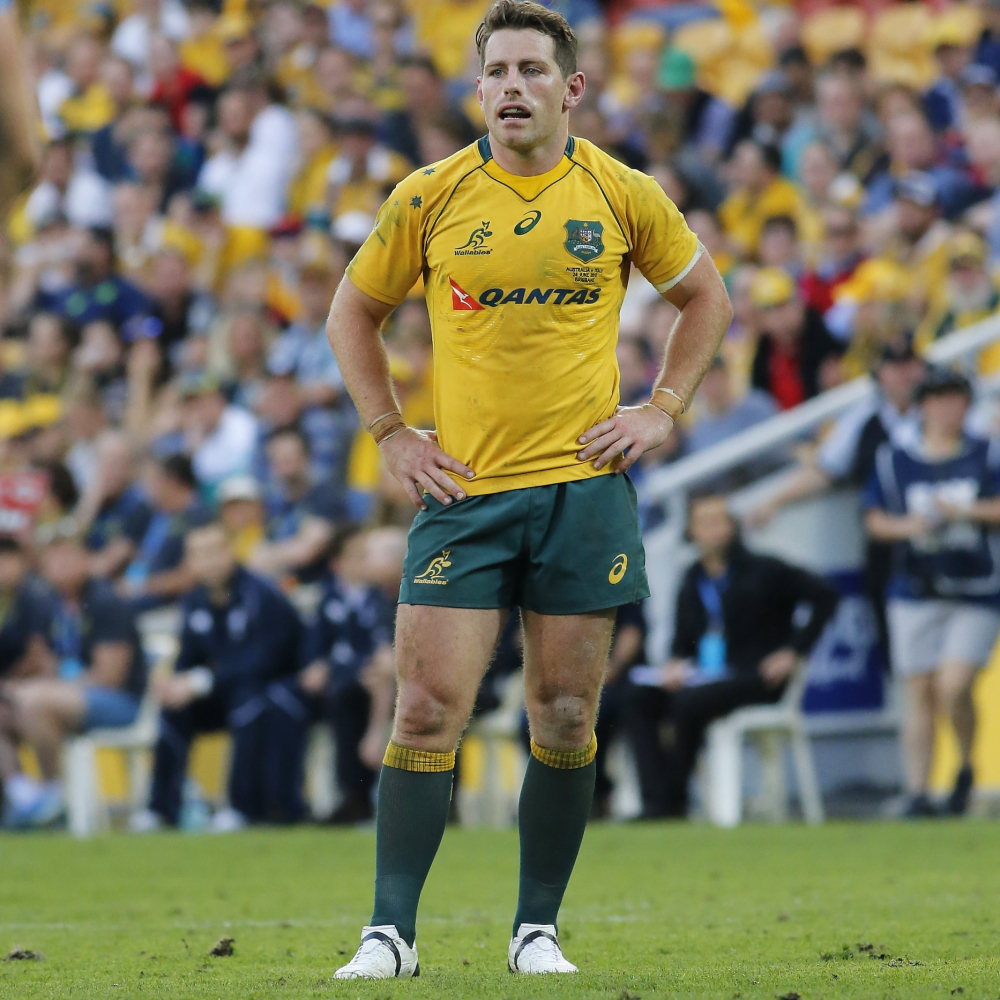
Foley with the Wallabies in 2017.

In July 2013, Michael Cheika, the former New South Wales Waratahs coach, announced that he would send a 34-man New South Wales Barbarians squad to Argentina to take on the Pumas in a two-match series, with Foley being named in the squad. On 3 August 2013, the Barbarians lost 29–27 in La Plata, Buenos Aires to Argentina. Foley kicked one penalty goal in the seventy-seventh minute.

Foley made his debut on 5 October 2013 against Argentina in the final match of the 2013 Rugby Championship. Foley come off the bench in the 65th minute replacing Quade Cooper. He played less than fifteen minutes before scoring his first international try in a seven-try victory in Rosario, Argentina under head coach Ewen McKenzie.

Foley's first start as a fly-half for Australia was on 7 June 2014 against France during the France tour of Australia at Suncorp Stadium, Brisbane. Foley started all three games at fly-half and scored a total of thirty-two points (ten conversions, four penalty goals).

=== 2015 Rugby World Cup ===
This was Foley's first Rugby World Cup campaign with Australia. Foley made his debut in the Rugby World Cup against Fiji on 23 September in Cardiff. He kicked two of the three tries scored and three penalty goals. Australia beat Fiji 28–13. Foley's second game in his first Rugby World Cup campaign came against England. Foley scored twenty-eight points (two tries, three conversions, and four penalty goals) compared with England's thirteen. Australia ran out 13–33 winners at Twickenham, knocking England out of the World Cup and sending themselves and Wales through to the quarterfinals. On 10 October, Foley scored all 15 points against Wales, in a 15–6 victory and progressed to the quarterfinals having won Pool A. Foley's role against Scotland in the quarterfinals was critical, however, having missed three of five conversions. Foley managed to kick over an eighty-minute penalty goal to win the game for Australia in the wet conditions and send them through to the semifinals.

Towards the latter end of the tournament, specifically in the knockout stage, Foley's performance for the team began to worsen. Foley's most impactful duty is scoring, and Foley was scoring less than earlier in the tournament. On 25 October, against Argentina, Foley scored the second-lowest number of points he had scored all tournament with nine. However, Australia kept Argentina try-less throughout the game and won 15–29 to reach the final.

In the Final of the Rugby World Cup, Foley scored seven points, the lowest total of points in one game for the fly-half during the 2015 campaign. Despite only kicking two conversions and one penalty goal against the number one ranked team in the world, Foley finished equal third top point scorer with man of the match, Dan Carter. Foley finished the tournament with 82 points. Australia were defeated in the final 34–17.

=== 2019 Rugby World Cup ===
In the lead up to the Rugby World Cup in September, Foley played a total of 160 minutes of rugby for the Wallabies: eighty minutes against South Africa, eighty minutes against Samoa. Although playing rugby against South Africa, Foley did not play again in the 2019 Rugby Championship, Christian Lealiifano being the preferred fly-half.

In August, Foley was announced to be in the 31-man Wallabies squad to play at the World Cup. Foley's first and only match of the Rugby World Cup came against Wales, in what was touted as the pool decider. Foley was replaced just after half-time (45'), replaced by Matt To'omua. Australia lost by four points (25–29). Foley and teammates, specifically the scrum-half, Will Genia, were heavily criticised after the game for their poor performance, contributing to the loss. It was Australia's first loss to Wales in a Rugby World Cup since the inaugural World Cup in 1987. Foley scored three points at the 2019 Rugby World Cup.

== Career statistics ==
=== Club ===
As of 23 July 2026.

Statistics by club, season and competition
Club	Season	League						
Club	Season	Division	Apps	Tries	Con.	Pen.	Drop	Points
Waratahs	2011	Super Rugby	1	0	0	0	0	0
Waratahs	2012	Super Rugby	13	3	0	2	0	21
Waratahs	2013	Super Rugby	16	5	4	2	0	39
Waratahs	2014	Super Rugby	18	6	45	44	0	252
Waratahs	2015	Super Rugby	17	5	33	32	0	187
Waratahs	Total		65	19	82	80	0	499
Ricoh Black Rams	2015–16	Top League	10	2	20	4	0	62
Waratahs	2016	Super Rugby	12	1	35	15	0	120
Waratahs	2017	Super Rugby	10	3	31	12	0	113
Waratahs	2018	Super Rugby	18	3	68	24	0	223
Waratahs	2019	Super Rugby	14	3	28	22	0	137
Waratahs	Total		54	10	162	73	0	593
Kubota Spears	2020	Top League	6	3	17	6	0	67
Kubota Spears	2021	Top League	8	2	17	7	0	65
Kubota Spears	2022	Japan Rugby League One	10	5	26	19	0	134
Kubota Spears	2022–23	Japan Rugby League One	17	1	46	34	0	199
Kubota Spears	2023–24	Japan Rugby League One	8	5	31	3	0	96
Kubota Spears	2024–25	Japan Rugby League One	18	3	46	19	1	167
Kubota Spears	2025–26	Japan Rugby League One	20	3	63	16	0	189
Kubota Spears	Total		87	22	246	104	1	917
Waratahs	2027	Super Rugby Pacific	TBD					
Career total			216	53	510	261	1	2,009

=== International ===
As of 23 July 2026.

Statistics by team and year
Team	Year	Statistic					
Team	Year	Apps	Tries	Con.	Pen.	Drop	Points
Australia	2013	4	1	2	0	0	9
Australia	2014	14	3	24	27	1	147
Australia	2015	9	3	19	20	0	113
Australia	2016	15	4	25	26	0	151
Australia	2017	13	3	36	13	0	126
Australia	2018	13	1	16	10	0	67
Australia	2019	3	1	4	2	0	19
Australia	2022	5	0	9	10	0	48
Total		76	16	135	108	1	675
Australia A	2023	2	0	3	0	0	9
Total		78	16	138	108	1	684

=== International tries ===
List of international tries scored by Bernard Foley
No.	Opponent	Location	Competition	Date	Result	Ref.
1	Argentina	Estadio Gigante de Arroyito, Rosario	2013 Rugby Championship	5 October 2013	54–17	
2	New Zealand	Lang Park, Brisbane	2014 Autumn Internationals	18 October 2014	28–29	
3	Ireland	Aviva Stadium, Dublin	2014 Autumn Internationals	22 November 2014	23–26	
4	England	Twickenham Stadium, London	2014 Autumn Internationals	29 November 2014	17–26	
5	United States	Soldier Field, Chicago	2015 Rugby World Cup warm-up match	5 September 2015	47–10	
6	England	Twickenham Stadium, London	2015 Rugby World Cup	3 October 2015	33–13	
7	England	Twickenham Stadium, London	2015 Rugby World Cup	3 October 2015	33–13	
8	England	Sydney Football Stadium, Sydney	2016 England tour of Australia	25 June 2016	40–44	
9	South Africa	Lang Park, Brisbane	2016 Rugby Championship	10 September 2016	23–17	
10	Wales	Millennium Stadium, Cardiff	2016 Autumn Internationals	5 November 2016	32–8	
11	France	Stade de France, Saint-Denis	2016 Autumn Internationals	19 November 2016	25–23	
12	Italy	Lang Park, Brisbane	2017 June Tests	24 June 2017	40–17	
13	New Zealand	Forsyth Barr Stadium, Dunedin	2017 Rugby Championship	26 August 2017	29–35	
14	Argentina	Estadio Malvinas Argentinas, Mendoza	2017 Rugby Championship	7 October 2017	37–20	
15	Ireland	Lang Park, Brisbane	2018 Ireland tour of Australia	9 June 2018	18–9	
16	South Africa	Ellis Park Stadium, Johannesburg	2019 Rugby Championship	20 July 2019	17–35	

== Awards and honours ==
Waratahs

- Super Rugby: 2014

Kubota Spears

- Japan Rugby League One: 2022–23

Australia

- The Rugby Championship: 2015
- Rugby World Cup runner-up: 2015

Australia Sevens

- Commonwealth Games – Silver medal: 2010

Individual

- Australian Rugby Union Sevens Player of the Year: 2011
- Japan Rugby League One Top Scorer: 2022–23
- Japan Rugby League One Best XV: 2022–23
- Chris Whitaker Medal: 2012

== Personal life ==
Foley was born in Sydney, New South Wales in 1989 to Michael and Margaret Foley, a lawyer and a farmer. Foley's father's side of the family is Irish, originating from Ballyhooly in County Cork. Foley's brother, Conor, plays as a running back for the Australia national American football team. He's the second youngest out of 7 siblings. David, Bernard, Conor, Stephanie, Erica, Michaela and Rachel.

Preceded by Michael Hooper	New South Wales Waratahs captain 2018–19	Succeeded by Rob Simmons
