= 2014 Super Rugby final =

Men's rugby union club competition

2014 Super Rugby Grand Final
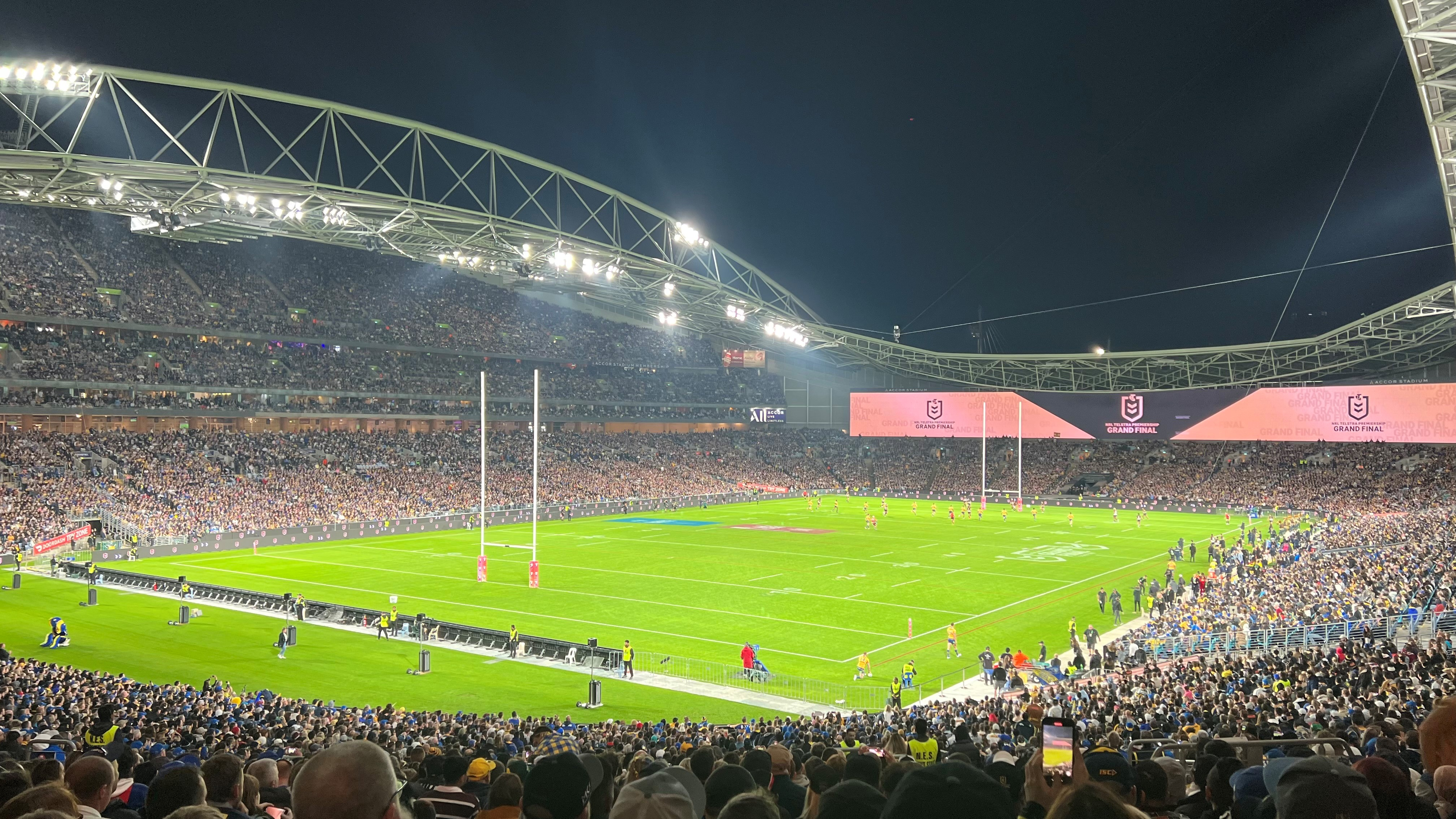
- Stadium Australia, the venue for the final
- Event: 2014 Super Rugby season
Waratahs	Crusaders
33	32
- Match details
- Date: 2 August 2014
- Venue: Stadium Australia, Sydney
- Man of the Match: Adam Ashley-Cooper (Waratahs)
- Referee: Craig Joubert (South Africa)
- Attendance: 61,823
- Weather: Partly cloudy night 13 °C (55 °F); 59% humidity

The 2014 Super Rugby final, stylised as the 2014 Super Rugby Grand Final, was the final match of the 2014 Super Rugby season and the decider of the Finals Series, the 19th season of the Southern Hemisphere's premier rugby union competition organised by SANZAAR. The 19th Super Rugby final, it was the ninth, and most recent, Trans-Tasman final (after 1997, 2000, 2002, 2004, 2005, 2008, 2011, and 2013). The match was played on 2 August 2014 at Stadium Australia in Sydney's Olympic Park.

The Waratahs won the match 33–32 after a final penalty goal through Bernard Foley sealed the Waratahs' maiden Super Rugby title.

== Background ==
The Waratahs reached their third final since the inception of the competition in 1996, the second-most of the Australian teams. Their total finals appearances sat behind the Brumbies, who lost in their sixth final the previous year (2013), and ahead of their arch-rivals the Queensland Reds whose sole final appearance came in their title-winning 2011 season. This was the Waratahs' first final since 2008, and was the first time they were hosts going into the final. In their two previous finals appearances (2005, 2008), the Waratahs met the Crusaders in Christchurch, having finished second on the regular season ladder in both cases. It was also coach Michael Cheika's first final as coach of the team. Leading into the final, the Waratahs were on a seven-match win streak, all of which were won by 16 points or more. The Waratahs were also the favourites, with bookmakers Ladbrokes and Betfair having the Waratahs at A$1.73 and A$1.86, respectively, compared to the Crusaders at A$2.10 and A$2.29, respectively.

The Crusaders reached their eleventh final, more than any other team in the competition. It was their first final appearance since 2011, which was also a Trans-Tasman matchup, featuring the Reds of Brisbane. Going into the match, the Crusaders had seven titles to their name, four more than the closest contenders (Blues, Bulls), two of which were won against the Waratahs (2005, 2008). During the regular season, the Crusaders edged out the Sharks for second-place on the ladder in the final round after a bonus-point victory over the Highlanders. This finish gave the Crusaders a home advantage Semi-final, for which they defeated the Sharks 38–6. This was Todd Blackadder's second final as coach of the Crusaders.

=== Venue ===
Pre-match teams' record
Team	Wins	W%
Waratahs	4	20
Crusaders	16	80
Total	20	

As per convention in the Super Rugby, the host of the final is whoever is ranked higher on the regular season ladder. As such, the Waratahs, whom finished the regular season minor premiers, earnt the right to host the 2014 final upon their Semi-final victory against the Brumbies. This was the first time in the competitions history that they had achieved this feat.

Although the Waratahs had played most of the regular season, and their semi-finals match, at the Sydney Football Stadium, the venue for the final was Stadium Australia. This was due to a nine-year deal the Waratahs had with the venue, wherein they were required to stage two home fixtures per season at the venue, with the agreement further stipulating that any final hosted by the Waratahs would also be held at the ground. The change led to Crusaders coach Todd Blackadder describing the venue as neutral ground. He stated before the match, "this could only be the accountants and not so much the players [making the decision]. I don’t think it will make a difference to them; no one is going to be hamstrung by it. But for us ... the psychological aspect of going to a neutral stadium is just fantastic."

=== Previous finals ===
Team	Previous final appearances (bold indicates winners)
Waratahs	2 (2005, 2008)
Crusaders	10 (**1998**, **1999**, **2000**, **2002**, 2003, 2004, **2005**, **2006**, **2008**, 2011)

== Route to the final ==
Note: In all results below, the score of the finalist is given first (H: home; A: away).

Waratahs		Round	Crusaders	
League
Pos / Team / Pld / W / D / L / PF / PA / PD / TF / TA / TB / LB / Pts; 1 / Waratahs / 16 / 12 / 0 / 4 / 481 / 272 / +209 / 55 / 24 / 9 / 1 / 58; 2 / Crusaders / 16 / 11 / 0 / 5 / 445 / 322 / +123 / 41 / 36 / 4 / 3 / 51; 3 / Sharks / 16 / 11 / 0 / 5 / 406 / 293 / +113 / 29 / 22 / 2 / 4 / 50; 4 / Brumbies / 16 / 10 / 0 / 6 / 412 / 378 / +34 / 49 / 35 / 4 / 1 / 45; 5 / Chiefs / 16 / 8 / 2 / 6 / 384 / 378 / +6 / 44 / 35 / 5 / 3 / 44; 6 / Highlanders / 16 / 8 / 0 / 8 / 401 / 442 / −41 / 39 / 52 / 5 / 5 / 42
Opponent	Result	Finals	Opponent	Result
Brumbies (H)	26–8	Semi-finals	Sharks (H)	38–6

== Match ==
2 August 2014
19:35 AEST (UTC+10)

Waratahs	33–32	Crusaders
Try: Ashley-Cooper (2) 4' m, 62' c Con: Foley (1/2) 64'; Pen: Foley (7/8) 2', 10', 15', 22', 37', 53', 79'	Report	Try: Todd 18' c Nadolo 42' c Con: Carter (1/1) 19'; Slade (1/1) 43'; Pen: Slade (6/6) 26', 35', 49', 56', 67', 76'

Stadium Australia, Sydney
Attendance: 61,823
Referee: Craig Joubert (South Africa)

Waratahs	Crusaders

FB	15	Israel Folau
RW	14	Alofa Alofa	(substituted off) 74'
OC	13	Adam Ashley-Cooper
IC	12	Kurtley Beale
LW	11	Rob Horne
FH	10	Bernard Foley
SH	9	Nick Phipps	(substituted off) 75'
N8	8	Wycliff Palu	19' to 26'
OF	7	Michael Hooper (c)
BF	6	Stephen Hoiles	(substituted off) 64'
LL	5	Jacques Potgieter			(substituted off) 49'
RL	4	Kane Douglas
TP	3	Sekope Kepu	(substituted off) 65'
HK	2	Tatafu Polota-Nau	(substituted off) 42'
LP	1	Benn Robinson
Substitutes:
HK	16	Tolu Latu	(substituted on) 42'
PR	17	Jeremy Tilse
PR	18	Paddy Ryan	(substituted on) 65'
LK	19	Will Skelton	(substituted on) 19'	(substituted off) 26'	(substituted on) 49'
FL	20	Mitchell Chapman	(substituted on) 64'
FL	21	Pat McCutcheon
SH	22	Brendan McKibbin	(substituted on) 75'
WG	23	Peter Betham	(substituted on) 74'
Coach:
Michael Cheika

FB	15	Israel Dagg
RW	14	Kieron Fonotia	(substituted off) 63'
CE	13	Ryan Crotty	67' to 71'
SF	12	Dan Carter	(substituted off) 30'
LW	11	Nemani Nadolo
FH	10	Colin Slade
SH	9	Andy Ellis		(substituted off) 71'
N8	8	Kieran Read (c)
OF	7	Matt Todd
BF	6	Richie McCaw
LL	5	Sam Whitelock
RL	4	Dominic Bird	(substituted off) 63'
TP	3	Owen Franks
HK	2	Corey Flynn	(substituted off) 63'
LP	1	Wyatt Crockett	(substituted off) 56'
Substitutes:
HK	16	Ben Funnell	(substituted on) 63'
PR	17	Joe Moody	(substituted on) 56'	(substituted off) 63'
PR	18	Nepo Laulala		(substituted on) 63'
LK	19	Jimmy Tupou	(substituted on) 63'
FL	20	Jordan Taufua
SH	21	Willi Heinz	(substituted on) 67'
FH	22	Tom Taylor	(substituted on) 30'
WG	23	Johnny McNicholl	(substituted on) 63'
Coach:
Todd Blackadder

Man of the Match:
Adam Ashley-Cooper (Waratahs)

Assistant Referees:
Steve Walsh (Australia)
James Leckie (Australia)
Television match official:
George Ayoub (Australia)

=== Statistics ===
Overall
Statistic	Waratahs	Crusaders
Tries scored	2	2
Possession	67%	33%
Territory	70%	30%
Kicks	21	21
Rucks won	111/114 (97%)	42/44 (95%)
Mauls won	3/3 (100%)	3/5 (60%)
Turnovers conceded	10	17
Tackles	64	176
Tackles missed	22	21
Tackle success	74%	89%
Offloads	14	20
Penalties conceded	13	10
Lineouts won	9/12 (75%)	13/13 (100%)
Scrums won	0/2 (0%)	3/4 (75%)
