= Adam Ashley-Cooper =

Australian rugby union player (born 1984)

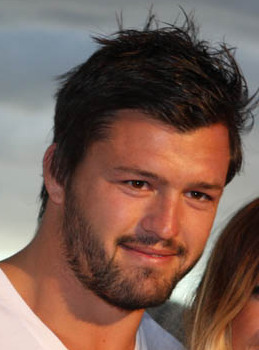
- Ashley-Cooper in 2012
- Born: Adam Phillip Ashley-Cooper; 27 March 1984 (age 42) Sydney, New South Wales, Australia
- Height: 182 cm (6 ft 0 in)
- Weight: 107 kg (16 st 12 lb; 236 lb)

Rugby union career
- Position(s): Wing, Centre, Fullback
Amateur team(s)
Years	Team	Apps	(Points)
2002–2015	Northern Suburbs	48	
Senior career
Years	Team	Apps	(Points)
2005–2011	Brumbies	78	(70)
2012–2015; 2019	Waratahs	76	(83)
2014	NSW Country Eagles	0	(0)
2015–2017	Bordeaux Bègles	37	(65)
2017–2018	Kobe Steelers	22	(25)
2020	Austin Gilgronis	0	(0)
2021	LA Giltinis	15	(20)
- Correct as of 24 September 2021
International career
Years	Team	Apps	(Points)
2003–2004	Australia Sevens	19	(55)
2004–2005	Australia U20	7	(5)
2005–2006	Australia A	3	(10)
2006–2011	Australia XV	6	(10)
2005–2019	Australia	121	(195)
- Correct as of 24 February 2021
Medal record
Men's rugby union
Representing Australia
Rugby World Cup
Silver medal – second place	2015 England	Squad
Bronze medal – third place	2011 New Zealand	Squad

Adam Phillip Ashley-Cooper (born 27 March 1984), nicknamed "Swoop" and "Mr. Versatile", is an Australian former rugby union player who played as a fullback, winger, or centre between 2002 and 2021. Wallaby #800, Ashley-Cooper earned 121 Test caps for Australia, the third most of any player at the time of his retirement, He also crossed for 39 Test tries, ranking third on Australia's all-time try-scoring list when he concluded his international career. Ashley-Cooper also holds the distinction of having scored the most individual tries against New Zealand, with nine.

== Early life ==
Ashley-Cooper is a descendant of the Earls of Shaftesbury. He took up rugby as a 15-year-old while living on the Central Coast in NSW. He was educated at the Berkeley Vale Community High School, the same school that produced Scotland and British and Irish Lions rugby union player Nathan Hines, icon of The Entrance Cricket Club Michael Thorpe, and NRL prop and Wests Tigers assistant coach Paul Stringer. He played junior rugby for the Ourimbah Razorbacks on the NSW Central Coast, the same club as Hines. In his teenage years he played both 10 and 12 (fly-half and inside-centre) and says: "I was pretty much all over the shop [even] in those days."

== Career ==
=== Super Rugby ===
Ashley-Cooper joined the Brumbies in 2004 on an ARU development contract. He played all of the Brumbies pre-season trials, and accompanied the team to South Africa. As a 20-year-old Ashley-Cooper spent most of his first year at the Brumbies flying around the globe playing for the Australian sevens. For the 2004 Super Rugby final between the Brumbies and Crusaders, Ashley-Cooper sat on the bench at Canberra Stadium as the Brumbies 23rd man, his boots at hand but never unpacked.

In 2005, Ashley-Cooper made his Super Rugby debut on the wing for the Brumbies at home against the Crusaders. He subsequently played two more games that season, against the Chiefs and the Queensland Reds. He was selected for the Wallabies in their second Tri Nations match against the Springboks and made his debut in Perth.

In the 2006 Super Rugby season, Ashley-Cooper played 12 matches for the Brumbies, and scored two tries.

In March 2011, Ashley-Cooper announced he would leave the Brumbies for the New South Wales Waratahs with the contract for the Waratahs starting in the 2012 Super Rugby season.

On 2 August 2014, the Waratahs played the Crusaders in the 2014 Super Rugby final at Stadium Australia in Sydney. Ashley-Cooper would score two-tries in a 33-32 win to help the Waratahs secure their first ever Super Rugby title. He was named Man of the Match.

=== Bordeaux ===
In December 2014, French Top 14 side Bordeaux announced that Ashley-Cooper had signed a two-year deal that would commence after the 2015 Rugby World Cup. He made his debut at centre in the club's Champions Cup match against the Ospreys in December 2015. Bordeaux won the match 33–27. In Bordeaux's following Champions Cup match, Ashley-Cooper scored his first try for the club against the Exeter Chiefs. Bordeaux did not advance past the pool stage however. Ashley-Cooper played 16 games for Bordeaux across the Top 14 and Champions Cup, averaging 65 minutes a match, and scoring five tries in total as the team finished mid-table.

In 2016–17, Ashley-Cooper played 21 games for Bordeaux, 20 in the Top 14 and one in the Champions Cup. He scored seven tries, including a hat-trick in round six against Lyon. Despite a strong performance across the season, Bordeaux finished just above relegation in their worst domestic season in many years.

=== Kobe Steelers ===
In June 2017, Ashely-Cooper signed a two-year deal with Japanese team Kobe Steelers in the Top League. In his first season, Ashley-Cooper played in all thirteen regular season games for the Steelers playing across the midfield and fullback positions. He scored his first try in round five against Toshiba Brave Lupus in a 32–25 away win. He added a further two tries to his tally in round ten of the season and was subsequently named Man of the Match in a 28-all draw.

In the first stage of the following season, which was played between August and October 2018, Ashley-Cooper scored one try as the Steelers went unbeaten across seven games. Playing every match at outside centre, Ashley-Cooper scored an additional two tries in the remaining part of the season, including the first in the final against Suntory Sungoliath. He secured his first Japanese title with the Steelers, their second in Top League history. In the post-season awards, Ashley-Cooper was named in the league's best XV team.

=== MLR ===
Having originally signed to play for the Austin Gilgronis prior to the cancellation of the 2020 Major League Rugby season, Ashley-Cooper later signed with LA Giltinis for the 2021 season.

In August 2021, Ashley-Cooper announced his retirement from rugby union.

== International career ==
Ashley-Cooper played in all but four of the 56 Tests played by Australia between 2008 and 2011, and missed just one of 42 through 2009 and 2011. His five tries at the 2011 Rugby World Cup saw him finish in the tournament's top five try-scorers.

In Ewen McKenzie's second year in charge as Wallabies coach, McKenzie named Ashley-Cooper as Wallabies vice-captain for the 2014 three-test June series against France.

Ashley-Cooper was selected for the Wallabies' 31-man squad for the 2015 Rugby World Cup and played the full 80 minutes of every knockout match on the right wing. He was named Man of the Match in the semi-final against Argentina on 25 October, scoring the second hat-trick of his career in the 29-15 win. This brought Ashley-Cooper's career try tally to 37 and his World Cup tally to 11.

Ashley-Cooper's last match for Australia was a 29-9 loss to New Zealand on 27 August 2016 during that year's Rugby Championship. Ashley-Cooper was subbed off in the 16th minute for a concussion test and didn't return to the field, being replaced by debutant Reece Hodge.

In November 2018, Ashley-Cooper was again selected by Australia for their game against Italy, after a break of more than two years.

In August 2019, Ashley-Cooper was named in the Wallabies squad for the 2019 Rugby World Cup in Japan.

== Player profile ==
=== Versatility ===
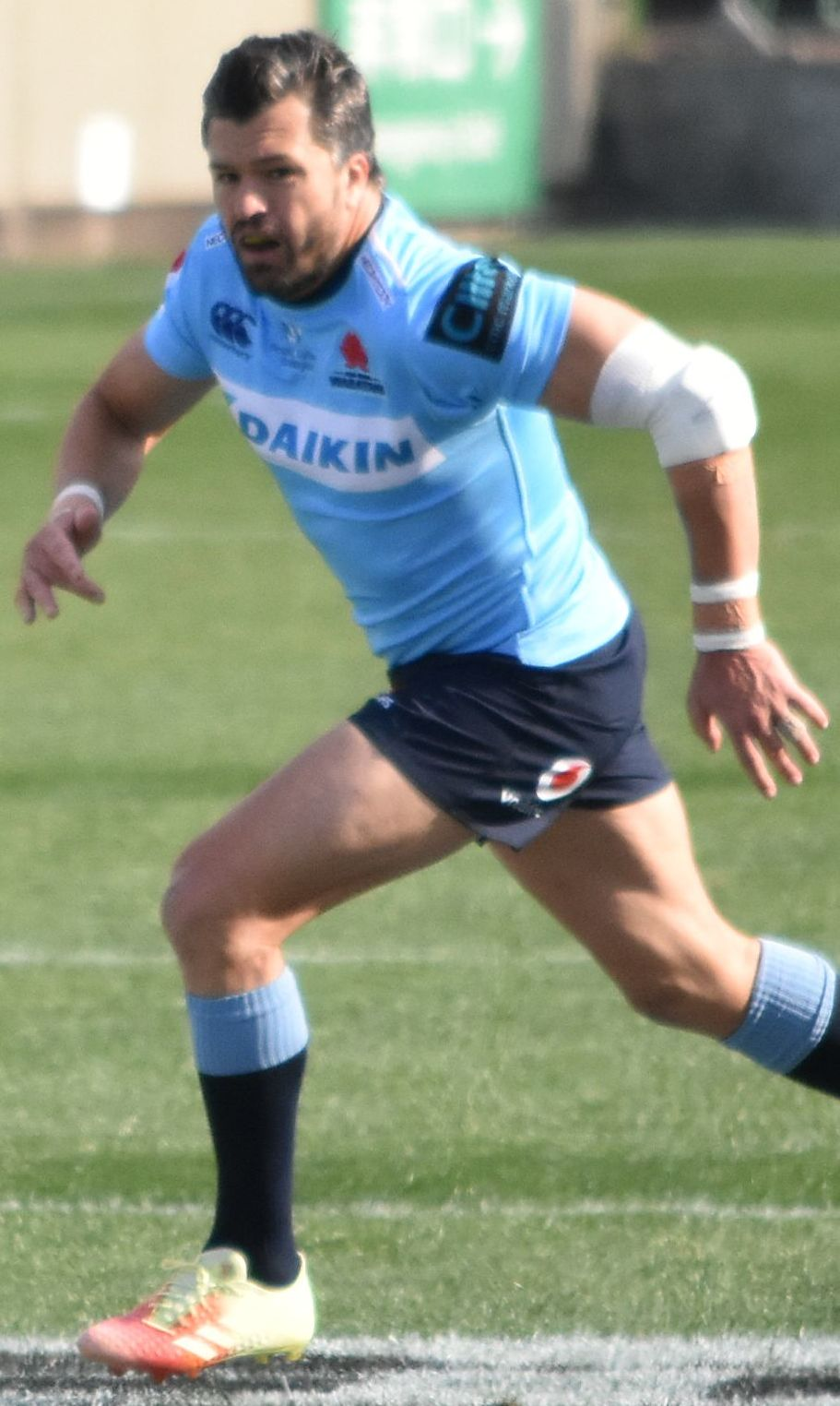
Ashley-Cooper in 2019.

Ashley-Cooper has been nicknamed "Mr Versatile", and sometimes Australia's "Mister Fix It", as is a utility player who can play centre, wing, or fullback. Fairfax journalist Greg Growden suggested that if Ashley-Cooper was asked: "What position do you expect to play this week?" he would answer: "I wouldn't have a clue." According to Growden, Wallabies ex-coach Robbie Deans thinks Ashley-Cooper's versatility is part of what makes him invaluable.

Against Italy, Ireland, USA, Russia, South Africa, New Zealand, and Wales at the 2011 Rugby World Cup Ashley-Cooper played outside centre, on both wings, and at fullback. Similarly, at the 2007 Rugby World Cup he covered the centres against Canada and Fiji, and right wing against Japan, and England. On occasion he played for the Waratahs at inside centre.

== Honours ==
=== Waratahs ===
- Super Rugby Champion: 2014
- Australian Conference Winner (2):2014, 2015
- Super Rugby Centurion

=== LA Giltinis ===
- Major League Rugby Champion: 2021

=== Australia ===
- Rugby World Cup runners up: 2015
- Rugby World Cup bronze medallists: 2011
- Tri Nations/The Rugby Championship champion: 2011, 2015
