= 2011 Rugby World Cup knockout stage =

Rugby union competition knockout stage

The knockout stage of the 2011 Rugby World Cup began on 8 October with a quarter-final between Ireland and Wales and concluded on 23 October with the final at Eden Park in Auckland.

New Zealand were the first team to qualify for the knockout stage, when they beat France 37–17 in their penultimate Pool A game. New Zealand and France re-encountered in the final, that was won by the local team 8–7. This was a rematch of the 1987 final, also in Eden Park and also won by New Zealand. This way, New Zealand got their second title, while France their third final.

For the first time in World Cup history, three teams that finished second in their respective pools qualified for the semi-finals, while South Africa became the second defending champions not to reach the semi-finals after Australia in 1995.

Furthermore, the bottom half of the bracket was entirely composed of the 2012 Rugby Championship teams and the other half was composed of the last four Six Nations champions since the last World Cup.

== Bracket ==
Quarter-finals
8 October – Wellington
Ireland	10
Wales	22
8 October – Auckland
England	12
France	19
9 October – Wellington
South Africa	9
Australia	11
9 October – Auckland
New Zealand	33
Argentina	10

Semi-finals
15 October – Auckland
Wales	8
France	9
16 October – Auckland
Australia	6
New Zealand	20

Final
23 October – Auckland
France	7
New Zealand	8
Third place
21 October – Auckland
Wales	18
Australia	21

== Quarter-finals ==
=== Ireland vs Wales ===
8 October 2011
18:00 NZDT (UTC+13)

Ireland	10–22	Wales
Try: Earls 45' c Con: O'Gara (1/1); Pen: O'Gara (1/1) 24'	Report	Try: Williams 3' c Phillips 51' m J. Davies 64' c Con: Priestland (2/3); Pen: Halfpenny (1/1) 29'

Westpac Stadium, Wellington
Attendance: 35,787
Referee: Craig Joubert (South Africa)

FB	15	Rob Kearney
RW	14	Tommy Bowe
OC	13	Brian O'Driscoll (c)
IC	12	Gordon D'Arcy
LW	11	Keith Earls	(substituted off) 72'
FH	10	Ronan O'Gara	(substituted off) 56'
SH	9	Conor Murray	(substituted off) 56'
N8	8	Jamie Heaslip	(substituted off) 75'
OF	7	Seán O'Brien
BF	6	Stephen Ferris	(substituted off) 75'
RL	5	Paul O'Connell
LL	4	Donncha O'Callaghan
TP	3	Mike Ross
HK	2	Rory Best
LP	1	Cian Healy
Replacements:
HK	16	Seán Cronin
PR	17	Tom Court
LK	18	Donnacha Ryan	(substituted on) 75'
N8	19	Denis Leamy	(substituted on) 75'
SH	20	Eoin Reddan	(substituted on) 56'
FH	21	Johnny Sexton	(substituted on) 56'
WG	22	Andrew Trimble	(substituted on) 72'
Coach:
(Ireland) Declan Kidney

FB	15	Leigh Halfpenny
RW	14	George North
OC	13	Jonathan Davies
IC	12	Jamie Roberts
LW	11	Shane Williams
FH	10	Rhys Priestland	(substituted off) 78'
SH	9	Mike Phillips
N8	8	Taulupe Faletau
OF	7	Sam Warburton (c)
BF	6	Dan Lydiate
RL	5	Alun Wyn Jones
LL	4	Luke Charteris	(substituted off) 41'
TP	3	Adam Jones
HK	2	Huw Bennett
LP	1	Gethin Jenkins
Replacements:
HK	16	Lloyd Burns
PR	17	Paul James
LK	18	Bradley Davies	(substituted on) 41'
FL	19	Ryan Jones
SH	20	Lloyd Williams
FH	21	James Hook	(substituted on) 78'
CE	22	Scott Williams
Coach:
(New Zealand) Warren Gatland

Man of the Match:
Mike Phillips (Wales)

Touch judges:
Wayne Barnes (England)
Romain Poite (France)
Television match official:
Giulio de Santis (Italy)

=== England vs France ===
8 October 2011
20:30 NZDT (UTC+13)

England	12–19	France
Try: Foden 55' c Cueto 77' m Con: Wilkinson (1/1)	Report	Try: Clerc 22' m Médard 31' m Pen: Yachvili (2/3) 11', 16'; Drop: Trinh-Duc (1/1) 73'

Eden Park, Auckland
Attendance: 49,105
Referee: Steve Walsh (Australia)

FB	15	Ben Foden
RW	14	Chris Ashton
OC	13	Manu Tuilagi
IC	12	Toby Flood
LW	11	Mark Cueto
FH	10	Jonny Wilkinson	(substituted off) 65'
SH	9	Ben Youngs	(substituted off) 65'
N8	8	Nick Easter
OF	7	Lewis Moody (c)	(substituted off) 63'
BF	6	Tom Croft	(substituted off) 47'
RL	5	Tom Palmer
LL	4	Louis Deacon	(substituted off) 50'
TP	3	Dan Cole		(substituted off) 63'
HK	2	Steve Thompson	(substituted off) 56'
LP	1	Matt Stevens	(substituted off) 50'	(substituted on) 63'
Replacements:
HK	16	Dylan Hartley	(substituted on) 56'
PR	17	Alex Corbisiero	(substituted on) 50'
LK	18	Courtney Lawes	(substituted on) 47'
LK	19	Simon Shaw	(substituted on) 50'
FL	20	James Haskell	(substituted on) 63'
SH	21	Richard Wigglesworth	(substituted on) 65'
WG	22	Matt Banahan	(substituted on) 65'
Coach:
(England) Martin Johnson

FB	15	Maxime Médard
RW	14	Vincent Clerc
OC	13	Aurélien Rougerie	(substituted off) 69'
IC	12	Maxime Mermoz	(substituted off) 79'
LW	11	Alexis Palisson
FH	10	Morgan Parra
SH	9	Dimitri Yachvili	(substituted off) 54'
N8	8	Imanol Harinordoquy	(substituted off) 73'
OF	7	Julien Bonnaire
BF	6	Thierry Dusautoir (c)
RL	5	Lionel Nallet
LL	4	Pascal Papé	(substituted off) 65'
TP	3	Nicolas Mas
HK	2	William Servat	(substituted off) 56'
LP	1	Jean-Baptiste Poux	(substituted off) 56'
Replacements:
HK	16	Dimitri Szarzewski	(substituted on) 56'
PR	17	Fabien Barcella	(substituted on) 56'
LK	18	Julien Pierre	(substituted on) 65'
N8	19	Louis Picamoles	(substituted on) 73'
FH	20	François Trinh-Duc	(substituted on) 54'
CE	21	David Marty	(substituted on) 69'
FB	22	Cédric Heymans	(substituted on) 79'
Coach:
(France) Marc Lièvremont

Man of the Match:
Imanol Harinordoquy (France)

Touch judges:
Alain Rolland (Ireland)
George Clancy (Ireland)
Television match official:
Shaun Veldsman (South Africa)

=== South Africa vs Australia ===
9 October 2011
18:00 NZDT (UTC+13)

South Africa	9–11	Australia
Pen: Steyn (2/4) 39', 56'; Drop: Steyn (1/1) 60'	Report	Try: Horwill 11' m Pen: O'Connor (2/2) 17', 72'

Westpac Stadium, Wellington
Attendance: 34,914
Referee: Bryce Lawrence (New Zealand)

FB	15	Patrick Lambie
RW	14	JP Pietersen
OC	13	Jaque Fourie
IC	12	Jean de Villiers
LW	11	Bryan Habana	(substituted off) 50'
FH	10	Morné Steyn
SH	9	Fourie du Preez
N8	8	Pierre Spies			(substituted off) 64'
BF	7	Schalk Burger	14' to 20'
OF	6	Heinrich Brüssow	(substituted off) 20'
RL	5	Victor Matfield
LL	4	Danie Rossouw
TP	3	Jannie du Plessis
HK	2	John Smit (c)	(substituted off) 50'
LP	1	Gurthrö Steenkamp
Replacements:
HK	16	Bismarck du Plessis	(substituted on) 50'
PR	17	CJ van der Linde
FL	18	Willem Alberts	(substituted on) 14'	(substituted off) 20'	(substituted on) 64'
FL	19	Francois Louw	(substituted on) 20'
SH	20	Francois Hougaard	(substituted on) 50'
FH	21	Butch James
CT	22	Gio Aplon
Coach:
(South Africa) Peter de Villiers

FB	15	Kurtley Beale	(substituted off) 75'
RW	14	James O'Connor
OC	13	Adam Ashley-Cooper
IC	12	Pat McCabe	(substituted off) 53'
LW	11	Digby Ioane
FH	10	Quade Cooper
SH	9	Will Genia
N8	8	Radike Samo	(substituted off) 73'
OF	7	David Pocock
BF	6	Rocky Elsom
RL	5	James Horwill (c)
LL	4	Dan Vickerman	(substituted off) 54'
TP	3	Ben Alexander
HK	2	Stephen Moore	(substituted off) 64'
LP	1	Sekope Kepu	(substituted off) 69'
Replacements:
HK	16	Tatafu Polota-Nau	(substituted on) 64'
PR	17	James Slipper	(substituted on) 69'
LK	18	Nathan Sharpe	(substituted on) 54'
N8	19	Ben McCalman	(substituted on) 73'
SH	20	Luke Burgess
FH	21	Berrick Barnes	(substituted on) 53'
CE	22	Anthony Fainga'a	(substituted on) 75'
Coach:
(New Zealand) Robbie Deans

Man of the Match:
David Pocock (Australia)

Touch judges:
Dave Pearson (England)
Romain Poite (France)
Television match official:
Giulio de Santis (Italy)

=== New Zealand vs Argentina ===
9 October 2011
20:30 NZDT (UTC+13)

New Zealand	33–10	Argentina
Try: Read 69' m Thorn 79' c Con: Cruden (1/1); Pen: Weepu (7/7) 13', 26', 36', 40', 50', 59', 73'	Report	Try: Farías Cabello 32' c Con: Contepomi (1/1); Pen: Bosch (1/1) 46'

Eden Park, Auckland
Attendance: 57,192
Referee: Nigel Owens (Wales)

FB	15	Mils Muliaina	(substituted off) 40'
RW	14	Cory Jane
OC	13	Conrad Smith
IC	12	Ma'a Nonu
LW	11	Sonny Bill Williams
FH	10	Colin Slade	(substituted off) 33'
SH	9	Piri Weepu	(substituted off) 73'
N8	8	Kieran Read
OF	7	Richie McCaw (c)	(substituted off) 73'
BF	6	Jerome Kaino
RL	5	Sam Whitelock	(substituted off) 63'
LL	4	Brad Thorn
TP	3	Owen Franks	(substituted off) 75'
HK	2	Keven Mealamu	(substituted off) 66'
LP	1	Tony Woodcock
Replacements:
HK	16	Andrew Hore	(substituted on) 66'
PR	17	John Afoa	(substituted on) 75'
LK	18	Ali Williams	(substituted on) 63'
N8	19	Victor Vito	(substituted on) 73'
SH	20	Jimmy Cowan	(substituted on) 73'
FH	21	Aaron Cruden	(substituted on) 33'
FB	22	Isaia Toeava	(substituted on) 40'
Coach:
(New Zealand) Graham Henry

FB	15	Martín Rodríguez		(substituted off) 69'
RW	14	Gonzalo Camacho
OC	13	Marcelo Bosch
IC	12	Felipe Contepomi (c)
LW	11	Horacio Agulla		(substituted off) 50'
FH	10	Santiago Fernández
SH	9	Nicolás Vergallo	(yellow card) 58'	49' to 53'
N8	8	Leonardo Senatore
OF	7	Juan Manuel Leguizamón				(substituted off) 80'
BF	6	Julio Farías Cabello
RL	5	Patricio Albacete
LL	4	Manuel Carizza		(substituted off) 63'
TP	3	Juan Figallo		(substituted off) 59'
HK	2	Mario Ledesma		(substituted off) 70'
LP	1	Rodrigo Roncero		(substituted off) 40'
Replacements:
HK	16	Agustín Creevy		(substituted on) 70'
PR	17	Martín Scelzo		(substituted on) 59'
PR	18	Marcos Ayerza		(substituted on) 40'
FL	19	Alejandro Campos		(substituted on) 63'
SH	20	Alfredo Lalanne		(substituted on) 49'	(substituted off) 53'	(substituted on) 80'
FB	21	Lucas González Amorosino		(substituted on) 69'
WG	22	Juan Imhoff		(substituted on) 50'
Coach:
(Argentina) Santiago Phelan

Man of the Match:
Piri Weepu (New Zealand)

Touch judges:
Jonathan Kaplan (South Africa)
George Clancy (Ireland)
Television match official:
Shaun Veldsman (South Africa)

Notes

- This was New Zealand fullback Mils Muliaina's 100th test, the second New Zealand player to have reached this milestone.

== Semi-finals ==
=== Wales vs France ===
15 October 2011
21:00 NZDT (UTC+13)

Wales	8–9	France
Try: Phillips 58' m Pen: Hook (1/3) 8'	Report	Pen: Parra (3/3) 22', 35', 51'

Eden Park, Auckland
Attendance: 58,630
Referee: Alain Rolland (Ireland)

FB	15	Leigh Halfpenny
RW	14	George North
OC	13	Jonathan Davies
IC	12	Jamie Roberts
LW	11	Shane Williams
FH	10	James Hook		(substituted off) 46'
SH	9	Mike Phillips
N8	8	Taulupe Faletau
OF	7	Sam Warburton (c)	(red card) 19'
BF	6	Dan Lydiate		(substituted off) 56'
RL	5	Alun Wyn Jones		(substituted off) 62'
LL	4	Luke Charteris
TP	3	Adam Jones		(substituted off) 10'
HK	2	Huw Bennett
LP	1	Gethin Jenkins
Replacements:
HK	16	Lloyd Burns
PR	17	Paul James		(substituted on) 10'
LK	18	Bradley Davies		(substituted on) 62'
FK	19	Ryan Jones		(substituted on) 56'
SH	20	Lloyd Williams
FH	21	Stephen Jones		(substituted on) 46'
CE	22	Scott Williams
Coach:
(New Zealand) Warren Gatland

FB	15	Maxime Médard
RW	14	Vincent Clerc
OC	13	Aurélien Rougerie
IC	12	Maxime Mermoz
LW	11	Alexis Palisson
FH	10	Morgan Parra
SH	9	Dimitri Yachvili
N8	8	Imanol Harinordoquy
OF	7	Julien Bonnaire	(substituted off) 75'
BF	6	Thierry Dusautoir (c)
RL	5	Lionel Nallet
LL	4	Pascal Papé	(substituted off) 62'
TP	3	Nicolas Mas
HK	2	William Servat	(substituted off) 45'
LP	1	Jean-Baptiste Poux	(substituted off) 45'
Replacements:
HK	16	Dimitri Szarzewski	(substituted on) 45'
PR	17	Fabien Barcella	(substituted on) 45'
LK	18	Julien Pierre	(substituted on) 62'
FL	19	Fulgence Ouedraogo	(substituted on) 75'
FH	20	François Trinh-Duc
FH	21	Jean-Marc Doussain
FB	22	Cédric Heymans
Coach:
(France) Marc Lièvremont

Man of the Match:
Julien Bonnaire (France)

Touch judges:
Jonathan Kaplan (South Africa)
Wayne Barnes (England)
Television match official:
Giulio De Santis (Italy)

Notes

- The Welsh captain was sent off after committing a tip-tackle, releasing the opponent past the horizontal off the ground in the 18th minute.

=== Australia vs New Zealand ===
16 October 2011
21:00 NZDT (UTC+13)

Australia	6–20	New Zealand
Pen: O'Connor (1/1) 16'; Drop: Cooper (1/1) 32'	Report	Try: Nonu 6' m Pen: Weepu (4/7) 13', 38', 43', 73'; Drop: Cruden (1/1) 22'

Eden Park, Auckland
Attendance: 60,087
Referee: Craig Joubert (South Africa)

FB	15	Adam Ashley-Cooper
RW	14	James O'Connor
OC	13	Anthony Fainga'a	(substituted off) 63'
IC	12	Pat McCabe	35' to 40'		(substituted off) 48'
LW	11	Digby Ioane
FH	10	Quade Cooper
SH	9	Will Genia
N8	8	Radike Samo	(substituted off) 60'
OF	7	David Pocock
BF	6	Rocky Elsom
RL	5	James Horwill (c)
LL	4	Dan Vickerman	23' to 27'		(substituted off) 60'
TP	3	Ben Alexander
HK	2	Stephen Moore	(substituted off) 66'
LP	1	Sekope Kepu	(substituted off) 21'
Replacements:
HK	16	Tatafu Polota-Nau	(substituted on) 66'
PR	17	James Slipper	(substituted on) 21'
LK	18	Rob Simmons	(substituted on) 23'	(substituted off) 27'	(substituted on) 60'
N8	19	Ben McCalman	(substituted on) 60'
SH	20	Luke Burgess
FH	21	Berrick Barnes	(substituted on) 35'	(substituted off) 40'	(substituted on) 48'
CE	22	Rob Horne	(substituted on) 63'
Coach:
(New Zealand) Robbie Deans

FB	15	Israel Dagg
RW	14	Cory Jane
OC	13	Conrad Smith
IC	12	Ma'a Nonu		(substituted off) 73'
LW	11	Richard Kahui
FH	10	Aaron Cruden
SH	9	Piri Weepu		(substituted off) 57'	(substituted on) 69'	(substituted off) 74'
N8	8	Kieran Read
OF	7	Richie McCaw (c)
BF	6	Jerome Kaino		(substituted off) 80'
RL	5	Sam Whitelock		(substituted off) 57'
LL	4	Brad Thorn
TP	3	Owen Franks		(substituted off) 80'
HK	2	Keven Mealamu		(substituted off) 64'
LP	1	Tony Woodcock
Replacements:
HK	16	Andrew Hore		(substituted on) 64'
PR	17	Ben Franks		(substituted on) 80'
LK	18	Ali Williams		(substituted on) 57'
N8	19	Victor Vito		(substituted on) 80'
SH	20	Andy Ellis		(substituted on) 57'	69' to 74'
FH	21	Stephen Donald
CE	22	Sonny Bill Williams	(yellow card) 76'	(substituted on) 73'
Coach:
(New Zealand) Graham Henry

Man of the Match:
Cory Jane (New Zealand)

Touch judges:
Nigel Owens (Wales)
Romain Poite (France)
Television match official:
Shaun Veldsman (South Africa)

== Bronze final ==
=== Wales vs Australia ===
21 October 2011
20:30 NZDT (UTC+13)

Wales	18–21	Australia
Try: Sh. Williams 50' m Halfpenny 80+' c Con: S. Jones (1/2); Pen: Hook (1/2) 20'; S. Jones (1/1) 71'	Tracker	Try: Barnes 12' c McCalman 76' m Con: O'Connor (1/2); Pen: O'Connor (2/4) 54', 58'; Drop: Barnes (1/1) 68'

Eden Park, Auckland
Attendance: 53,014
Referee: Wayne Barnes (England)

FB	15	Leigh Halfpenny
RW	14	George North	33' to 38'
OC	13	Jonathan Davies	(substituted off) 71'
IC	12	Jamie Roberts
LW	11	Shane Williams
FH	10	James Hook			(substituted off) 51'
SH	9	Mike Phillips	(substituted off) 64'
N8	8	Ryan Jones
OF	7	Taulupe Faletau
BF	6	Dan Lydiate	(substituted off) 64'
RL	5	Bradley Davies
LL	4	Luke Charteris	(substituted off) 53'
TP	3	Paul James	(substituted off) 64'
HK	2	Huw Bennett	(substituted off) 71'
LP	1	Gethin Jenkins (c)
Replacements:
HK	16	Lloyd Burns	(substituted on) 71'
PR	17	Ryan Bevington	(substituted on) 64'
LK	18	Alun Wyn Jones	(substituted on) 53'
N8	19	Andy Powell	(substituted on) 64'
SH	20	Lloyd Williams	(substituted on) 64'
FH	21	Stephen Jones	(substituted on) 33'	(substituted off) 38'	(substituted on) 51'
CE	22	Scott Williams	(substituted on) 71'
Coach:
(New Zealand) Warren Gatland

FB	15	Kurtley Beale	(substituted off) 10'
RW	14	James O'Connor
OC	13	Adam Ashley-Cooper
IC	12	Berrick Barnes
LW	11	Digby Ioane
FH	10	Quade Cooper	(substituted off) 22'
SH	9	Will Genia	(substituted off) 68'
N8	8	Ben McCalman
OF	7	David Pocock
BF	6	Scott Higginbotham	31' to 34'
RL	5	Nathan Sharpe	(substituted off) 46'
LL	4	James Horwill (c)	(substituted off) 71'
TP	3	Salesi Ma'afu	(substituted off) 60'
HK	2	Tatafu Polota-Nau	(substituted off) 52'
LP	1	James Slipper
Replacements:
HK	16	Saia Fainga'a	(substituted on) 52'
PR	17	Ben Alexander	(substituted on) 60'
LK	18	Rob Simmons	(substituted on) 46'
N8	19	Radike Samo	(substituted on) 31'	(substituted off) 34'	(substituted on) 71'
SH	20	Luke Burgess	(substituted on) 68'
CE	21	Anthony Fainga'a	(substituted on) 22'
CE	22	Rob Horne	(substituted on) 10'
Coach:
(New Zealand) Robbie Deans

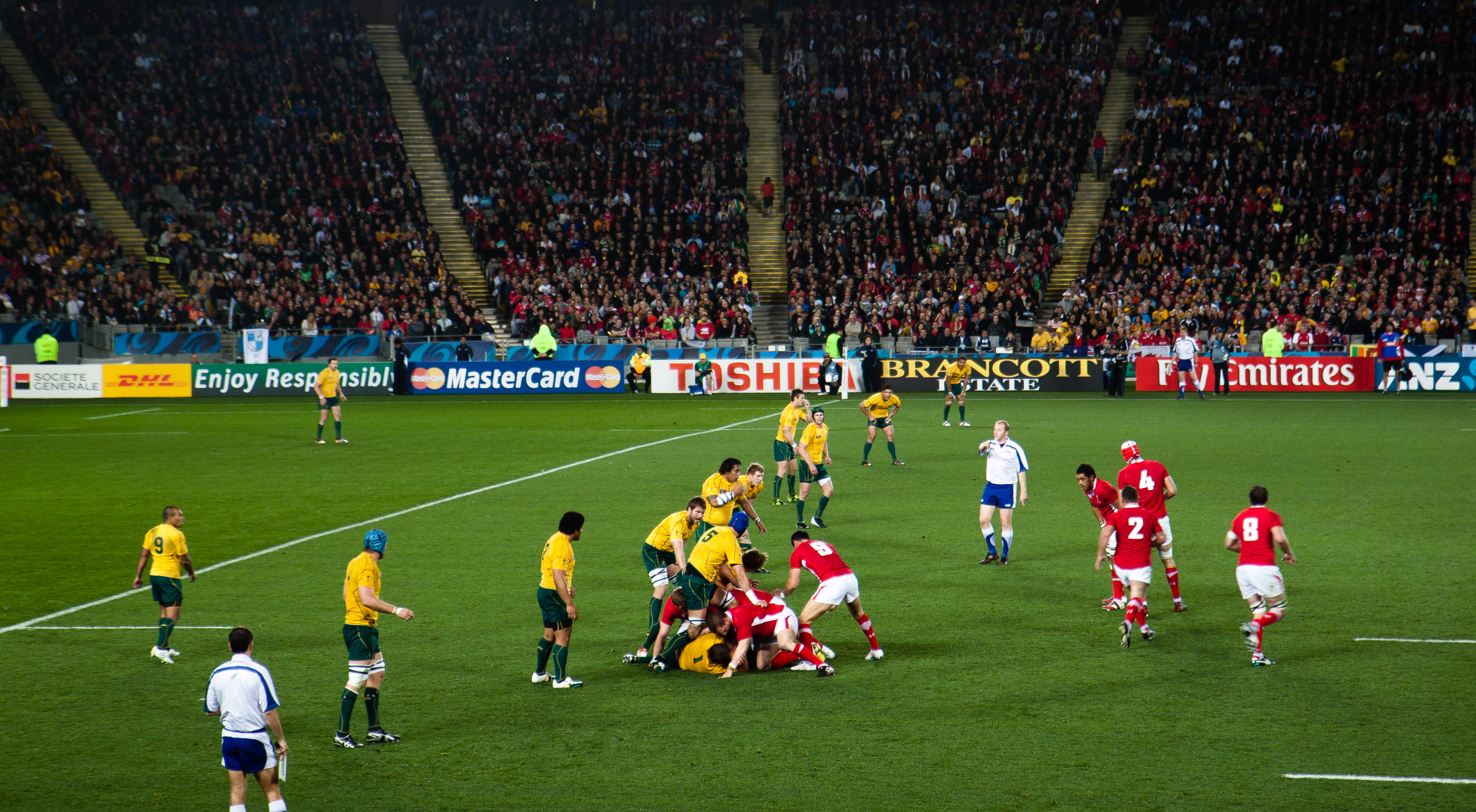

Man of the Match:
Berrick Barnes (Australia)

Touch judges:
Romain Poite (France)
George Clancy (Ireland)
Television match official:
Shaun Veldsman (South Africa)

Notes

- This was Australian lock Nathan Sharpe's 100th test, the fifth Australian to reach the milestone.

== Final ==
=== France vs New Zealand ===
23 October 2011
21:00 NZDT (UTC+13)

France	7–8	New Zealand
Try: Dusautoir 47' c Con: Trinh-Duc (1/1)	Report	Try: Woodcock 15' m Pen: Donald (1/1) 46'

Eden Park, Auckland
Attendance: 61,079
Referee: Craig Joubert (South Africa)

FB	15	Maxime Médard
RW	14	Vincent Clerc	(substituted off) 46'
OC	13	Aurélien Rougerie
IC	12	Maxime Mermoz
LW	11	Alexis Palisson
FH	10	Morgan Parra	12' to 18'		(substituted off) 23'
SH	9	Dimitri Yachvili	(substituted off) 76'
N8	8	Imanol Harinordoquy
OF	7	Julien Bonnaire
BF	6	Thierry Dusautoir (c)
RL	5	Lionel Nallet
LL	4	Pascal Papé	(substituted off) 70'
TP	3	Nicolas Mas
HK	2	William Servat	(substituted off) 65'
LP	1	Jean-Baptiste Poux	(substituted off) 65'
Replacements:
HK	16	Dimitri Szarzewski	(substituted on) 65'
PR	17	Fabien Barcella	(substituted on) 65'
LK	18	Julien Pierre	(substituted on) 70'
FL	19	Fulgence Ouedraogo
FH	20	Jean-Marc Doussain	(substituted on) 76'
FH	21	François Trinh-Duc	(substituted on) 12'	(substituted off) 18'	(substituted on) 23'
FB	22	Damien Traille	(substituted on) 46'
Coach:
(France) Marc Lièvremont

FB	15	Israel Dagg
RW	14	Cory Jane
OC	13	Conrad Smith
IC	12	Ma'a Nonu	(substituted off) 76'
LW	11	Richard Kahui
FH	10	Aaron Cruden	(substituted off) 34'
SH	9	Piri Weepu	(substituted off) 50'
N8	8	Kieran Read
OF	7	Richie McCaw (c)
BF	6	Jerome Kaino
RL	5	Sam Whitelock	(substituted off) 49'
LL	4	Brad Thorn
TP	3	Owen Franks
HK	2	Keven Mealamu	(substituted off) 49'
LP	1	Tony Woodcock
Replacements:
HK	16	Andrew Hore	(substituted on) 49'
PR	17	Ben Franks
LK	18	Ali Williams	(substituted on) 49'
FL	19	Adam Thomson
SH	20	Andy Ellis	(substituted on) 50'
FH	21	Stephen Donald	(substituted on) 34'
CE	22	Sonny Bill Williams	(substituted on) 76'
Coach:
(New Zealand) Graham Henry

Man of the Match:
Thierry Dusautoir (France)

Touch judges:
Alain Rolland (Ireland)
Nigel Owens (Wales)
Television match official:
Giulio de Santis (Italy)
