= 2012 Rugby Championship =

International rugby union competition

- Date: 18 August – 6 October 2012
- Countries: Argentina; Australia; New Zealand; South Africa

Final positions
- Champions: New Zealand (11th title)
- Bledisloe Cup: New Zealand
- Freedom Cup: New Zealand
- Mandela Challenge Plate: Australia
- Puma Trophy: Australia

Tournament statistics
- Matches played: 12
- Tries scored: 44 (3.67 per match)
- Top scorer(s): (New Zealand) Dan Carter (58)
- Most tries: (South Africa) Bryan Habana (7)

The 2012 Rugby Championship was the inaugural annual rugby union series between the national rugby union teams of New Zealand, Australia, South Africa, and Argentina. For sponsorship reasons, the competition was known as The Castle Rugby Championship in South Africa, The Investec Rugby Championship in New Zealand, The Castrol Edge Rugby Championship in Australia and The Personal Rugby Championship in Argentina.

The 2012 Rugby Championship kicked off on 18 August with New Zealand defeating Australia and finished on 6 October. Each team played the other twice on a home and away basis. The inaugural Championship was won by New Zealand, which was their 11th Southern Hemisphere title including the Tri Nations.

== Standings ==
Place	Nation	Games				Points			Try Bonus	Losing Bonus	Table points
Place	Nation	Played	Won	Drawn	Lost	For	Against	Diff	Try Bonus	Losing Bonus	Table points
1	New Zealand	6	6	0	0	177	66	+111	2	0	26
2	Australia	6	3	0	3	101	137	−36	0	0	12
3	South Africa	6	2	1	3	120	109	+11	1	1	12
4	Argentina	6	0	1	5	80	166	−86	0	2	4

== Fixtures ==
=== Round 1 ===
18 August 2012
20:05 AEST (UTC+10)

Australia	19–27	New Zealand
Try: Sharpe 38' c Con: Barnes (1/1) 39'; Pen: Barnes (4/4) 2', 44', 49', 75'	Report	Try: Dagg 12' c Jane 32' m Con: Carter (1/2) 13'; Pen: Carter (5/6) 10', 19', 47', 62', 80+2'

Stadium Australia, Sydney
Attendance: 76,877
Referee: Alain Rolland (Ireland)

Australia	New Zealand

FB	15	Kurtley Beale
RW	14	Adam Ashley-Cooper
OC	13	Rob Horne
IC	12	Anthony Fainga'a
LW	11	Digby Ioane
FH	10	Berrick Barnes
SH	9	Will Genia
N8	8	Scott Higginbotham
OF	7	David Pocock (c)
BF	6	Dave Dennis	(substituted off) 64'
RL	5	Nathan Sharpe
LL	4	Sitaleki Timani	40' to 44'		(substituted off) 66'	(substituted on) 70'
TP	3	Sekope Kepu		52' to 56'		(substituted off) 79'
HK	2	Tatafu Polota-Nau	(substituted off) 59'
LP	1	Benn Robinson	(substituted off) 68'
Substitutes:
HK	16	Stephen Moore	(substituted on) 59'
PR	17	James Slipper	(substituted on) 68'
LK	18	Rob Simmons	(substituted on) 40'	(substituted off) 44'	(substituted on) 66'	(substituted off) 70'
FL	19	Radike Samo	(substituted on) 64'
FL	20	Michael Hooper
SH	21	Nick Phipps
WG	22	Drew Mitchell
Coach:
(New Zealand) Robbie Deans

FB	15	Israel Dagg
RW	14	Cory Jane
OC	13	Ma'a Nonu
IC	12	Sonny Bill Williams
LW	11	Hosea Gear
FH	10	Dan Carter
SH	9	Aaron Smith	(substituted off) 79'
N8	8	Kieran Read
OF	7	Richie McCaw (c)
BF	6	Liam Messam
RL	5	Sam Whitelock
LL	4	Luke Romano	(substituted off) 52'
TP	3	Owen Franks
HK	2	Keven Mealamu	(substituted off) 77'
LP	1	Tony Woodcock	(substituted off) 64'
Substitutes:
HK	16	Andrew Hore	(substituted on) 77'
PR	17	Ben Franks	(substituted on) 64'
LK	18	Brodie Retallick	(substituted on) 52'
FL	19	Victor Vito
SH	20	Piri Weepu	(substituted on) 79'
FH	21	Aaron Cruden
FB	22	Ben Smith
Coach:
(New Zealand) Steve Hansen

Man of the Match
Israel Dagg (New Zealand)

Touch judges:
Nigel Owens (Wales)
Lourens van der Merwe (South Africa)
Television match official:
Matt Goddard (Australia)

18 August 2012
17:00 SAST (UTC+02)

South Africa	27–6	Argentina
Try: Kirchner 16' c Coetzee 27' c Habana 56' c Con: M. Steyn (3/3) 17', 28', 57'; Pen: M. Steyn (2/2) 3', 24'	Report	Pen: Hernández (2/4) 13', 30'

Newlands Stadium, Cape Town
Attendance: 38,843
Referee: Steve Walsh (Australia)

South Africa	Argentina

FB	15	Zane Kirchner
RW	14	Bryan Habana	(substituted off) 69'
OC	13	Jean de Villiers (c)
IC	12	François Steyn
LW	11	Lwazi Mvovo	(substituted off) 60'
FH	10	Morné Steyn
SH	9	Francois Hougaard
N8	8	Keegan Daniel	(substituted off) 52'
OF	7	Willem Alberts
BF	6	Marcell Coetzee
RL	5	Andries Bekker	(substituted off) 58'
LL	4	Eben Etzebeth
TP	3	Jannie du Plessis	(substituted off) 31'	(substituted on) 35'	(substituted off) 70'
HK	2	Bismarck du Plessis	(substituted off) 4'
LP	1	Tendai Mtawarira
Substitutes:
HK	16	Adriaan Strauss	(substituted on) 4'
PR	17	Pat Cilliers	(substituted on) 31'	(substituted off) 35'	(substituted on) 70'
LK	18	Flip van der Merwe	(substituted on) 58'
FL	19	Jacques Potgieter	(substituted on) 52'
SH	20	Ruan Pienaar	(substituted on) 60'
FH	21	Patrick Lambie
CE	22	JJ Engelbrecht	(substituted on) 69'
Coach:
(South Africa) Heyneke Meyer

FB	15	Lucas González Amorosino
RW	14	Gonzalo Camacho
OC	13	Marcelo Bosch
IC	12	Santiago Fernández	(substituted off) 69'
LW	11	Horacio Agulla
FH	10	Juan Martín Hernández
SH	9	Nicolás Vergallo	(substituted off) 65'
N8	8	Juan Martín Fernández Lobbe (c)
OF	7	Alvaro Galindo	(substituted off) 42'
BF	6	Julio Farías Cabello	(substituted off) 69'
RL	5	Patricio Albacete
LL	4	Manuel Carizza
TP	3	Juan Figallo	(substituted off) 60'
HK	2	Eusebio Guiñazú
LP	1	Rodrigo Roncero	(substituted off) 60'
Substitutes:
HK	16	Bruno Postiglioni
PR	17	Marcos Ayerza	(substituted on) 60'
PR	18	Juan Pablo Orlandi	(substituted on) 60'
FL	19	Tomás Leonardi	(substituted on) 42'
N8	20	Leonardo Senatore	(substituted on) 69'
SH	21	Martín Landajo	(substituted on) 65'
CE	22	Martín Rodríguez	(substituted on) 69'
Coach:
(Argentina) Santiago Phelan

Man of the Match
Morné Steyn (South Africa)

Touch judges:
Jérôme Garcès (France)
John Lacey (Ireland)
Television match official:
Johann Meuwesen (South Africa)

=== Round 2 ===
25 August 2012
19:35 NZST (UTC+12)

New Zealand	22–0	Australia
Try: Dagg 45' c Con: Carter (1/1) 46'; Pen: Carter (5/6) 25', 29', 38', 42', 48'	Report

Eden Park, Auckland
Attendance: 48,460
Referee: Nigel Owens (Wales)

New Zealand	Australia

FB	15	Israel Dagg	(substituted off) 70'
RW	14	Cory Jane
OC	13	Ma'a Nonu	(substituted off) 55'
IC	12	Sonny Bill Williams
LW	11	Hosea Gear
FH	10	Dan Carter
SH	9	Aaron Smith	(substituted off) 64'
N8	8	Kieran Read
OF	7	Richie McCaw (c)
BF	6	Liam Messam	(substituted off) 64'
RL	5	Sam Whitelock
LL	4	Luke Romano	(substituted off) 47'
TP	3	Owen Franks
HK	2	Keven Mealamu	(substituted off) 47'
LP	1	Wyatt Crockett	(substituted off) 55'
Substitutes:
HK	16	Andrew Hore	(substituted on) 47'
PR	17	Ben Franks	(substituted on) 55'
LK	18	Brodie Retallick	(substituted on) 47'
FL	19	Victor Vito	(substituted on) 64'
SH	20	Piri Weepu	(substituted on) 64'
FH	21	Aaron Cruden	(substituted on) 70'
FB	22	Ben Smith	(substituted on) 55'
Coach:
(New Zealand) Steve Hansen

FB	15	Adam Ashley-Cooper
RW	14	Drew Mitchell		(substituted off) 34'
OC	13	Rob Horne		(substituted off) 40'
IC	12	Berrick Barnes
LW	11	Digby Ioane
FH	10	Quade Cooper
SH	9	Will Genia (c)	(yellow card) 28' to 38'
N8	8	Scott Higginbotham		(substituted off) 46'
OF	7	Michael Hooper
BF	6	Dave Dennis		(substituted off) 54'
RL	5	Nathan Sharpe
LL	4	Sitaleki Timani
TP	3	Ben Alexander
HK	2	Stephen Moore		(substituted off) 72'
LP	1	Benn Robinson		(substituted off) 42'
Substitutes:
HK	16	Saia Fainga'a		(substituted on) 72'
PR	17	James Slipper		(substituted on) 42'
FL	18	Radike Samo		(substituted on) 46'
FL	19	Liam Gill		(substituted on) 54'
SH	20	Nick Phipps
CE	21	Anthony Fainga'a		(substituted on) 40'
FB	22	Kurtley Beale		(substituted on) 34'
Coach:
(New Zealand) Robbie Deans

Man of the Match:
Sonny Bill Williams (New Zealand)

Touch judges:
Alain Rolland (Ireland)
Lourens van der Merwe (South Africa)
Television match official:
Ben Skeen (New Zealand)

25 August 2012
16:10 AST (UTC−03)

Argentina	16–16	South Africa
Try: Fernández 16' c Con: Rodríguez (1/1) 17'; Pen: Rodríguez (3/5) 11', 35', 50'	Report	Try: F. Steyn 64' c Con: M. Steyn (1/1) 65'; Pen: M. Steyn (3/7) 32', 48', 53'

Estadio Malvinas Argentinas, Mendoza
Attendance: 37,679
Referee: Steve Walsh (Australia)

Argentina	South Africa

FB	15	Martín Rodríguez
RW	14	Gonzalo Camacho
OC	13	Marcelo Bosch
IC	12	Santiago Fernández
LW	11	Horacio Agulla
FH	10	Nicolás Sánchez	(substituted off) 54'
SH	9	Nicolás Vergallo	(substituted off) 56'
N8	8	Juan Martín Fernández Lobbe (c)
OF	7	Alvaro Galindo	(substituted off) 35'
BF	6	Julio Farías Cabello	(substituted off) 75'
RL	5	Patricio Albacete
LL	4	Manuel Carizza
TP	3	Juan Figallo
HK	2	Eusebio Guiñazú
LP	1	Rodrigo Roncero	(substituted off) 56'
Substitutes:
HK	16	Bruno Postiglioni
PR	17	Marcos Ayerza	(substituted on) 56'
N8	18	Leonardo Senatore	(substituted on) 75'
FL	19	Tomás Leonardi	(substituted on) 35'
SH	20	Martín Landajo	(substituted on) 56'
FB	21	Lucas González Amorosino	(substituted on) 54'
WG	22	Juan Imhoff
Coach:
(Argentina) Santiago Phelan

FB	15	Zane Kirchner
RW	14	Bryan Habana	(substituted off) 57'
OC	13	Jean de Villiers (c)
IC	12	François Steyn
LW	11	Lwazi Mvovo
FH	10	Morné Steyn
SH	9	Francois Hougaard
N8	8	Willem Alberts
OF	7	Jacques Potgieter
BF	6	Marcell Coetzee	(substituted off) 65'
RL	5	Andries Bekker	(substituted off) 49'
LL	4	Eben Etzebeth
TP	3	Jannie du Plessis	(substituted off) 68'
HK	2	Adriaan Strauss	(substituted off) 75'
LP	1	Tendai Mtawarira
Substitutes:
HK	16	Tiaan Liebenberg	(substituted on) 75'
PR	17	Pat Cilliers	(substituted on) 68'
LK	18	Flip van der Merwe	(substituted on) 49'
N8	19	Keegan Daniel	(substituted on) 65'
SH	20	Ruan Pienaar	(substituted on) 57'
FH	21	Patrick Lambie
CE	22	JJ Engelbrecht
Coach:
(South Africa) Heyneke Meyer

Man of the Match
Rodrigo Roncero (Argentina)

Touch judges:
Jérôme Garcès (France)
John Lacey (Ireland)
Television match official:
Francisco Pastrana (Argentina)

=== Round 3 ===
8 September 2012
19:35 NZST (UTC+12)

New Zealand	21–5	Argentina
Try: Savea 66' m Jane 71' c Con: Cruden (1/2) 73'; Pen: Cruden (3/5) 8', 24', 51'	Report	Try: Roncero 12' m

Wellington Regional Stadium, Wellington
Attendance: 29,932
Referee: Romain Poite (France)

New Zealand	Argentina

FB	15	Israel Dagg
RW	14	Cory Jane
OC	13	Conrad Smith	(substituted off) 76'
IC	12	Ma'a Nonu
LW	11	Julian Savea
FH	10	Aaron Cruden	(substituted off) 75'
SH	9	Aaron Smith	(substituted off) 61'
N8	8	Kieran Read
OF	7	Richie McCaw (c)
BF	6	Victor Vito	(substituted off) 43'
RL	5	Brodie Retallick	(substituted off) 64'
LL	4	Luke Romano
TP	3	Owen Franks	(substituted off) 74'
HK	2	Keven Mealamu	(substituted off) 49'
LP	1	Tony Woodcock
Substitutes:
HK	16	Andrew Hore	(substituted on) 49'
PR	17	Charlie Faumuina	(substituted on) 74'
LK	18	Sam Whitelock	(substituted on) 64'
FL	19	Liam Messam	(substituted on) 43'
SH	20	Piri Weepu	(substituted on) 61'
FH	21	Beauden Barrett	(substituted on) 75'
FB	22	Ben Smith	(substituted on) 76'
Coach:
(New Zealand) Steve Hansen

FB	15	Martín Rodríguez		(substituted off) 67'
RW	14	Gonzalo Camacho
OC	13	Marcelo Bosch		(substituted off) 77'
IC	12	Santiago Fernández
LW	11	Horacio Agulla
FH	10	Juan Martín Hernández
SH	9	Nicolás Vergallo
N8	8	Juan Martín Fernández Lobbe (c)
OF	7	Juan Manuel Leguizamón		(substituted off) 41'
BF	6	Julio Farías Cabello	(yellow card) 58' to 68'	(substituted off) 74'
RL	5	Patricio Albacete
LL	4	Manuel Carizza
TP	3	Juan Figallo		(substituted off) 51'
HK	2	Eusebio Guiñazú
LP	1	Rodrigo Roncero		(substituted off) 51'
Substitutes:
HK	16	Agustín Creevy
PR	17	Marcos Ayerza		(substituted on) 51'
PR	18	Juan Pablo Orlandi		(substituted on) 51'
N8	19	Leonardo Senatore		(substituted on) 74'
FL	20	Tomás Leonardi		(substituted on) 41'
SH	21	Martín Landajo		(substituted on) 77'
WG	22	Lucas González Amorosino		(substituted on) 67'
Coach:
(Argentina) Santiago Phelan

Man of the Match
Marcelo Bosch (Argentina)

Touch judges:
George Clancy (Ireland)
James Leckie (Australia)
Television match official:
Vinny Munro (New Zealand)

8 September 2012
18:35 AWST (UTC+08)

Australia	26–19	South Africa (1 BP)
Try: Higginbotham 56' c Alexander 68' c Con: Barnes (2/2) 55', 69'; Pen: Barnes (4/4) 18', 29', 48', 63'	Report	Try: Habana 20' c Con: M. Steyn (1/1) 20'; Pen: M. Steyn (2/3) 3', 67'; F. Steyn (2/2) 25', 60'

Subiaco Oval, Perth
Attendance: 34,377
Referee: Nigel Owens (Wales)

Australia	South Africa

FB	15	Kurtley Beale	(substituted off) 71'
RW	14	Dominic Shipperley
OC	13	Adam Ashley-Cooper
IC	12	Berrick Barnes	(substituted off) 71'
LW	11	Digby Ioane
FH	10	Quade Cooper
SH	9	Will Genia (c)	(substituted off) 70'
N8	8	Radike Samo	(substituted off) 52'
OF	7	Michael Hooper
BF	6	Dave Dennis
RL	5	Nathan Sharpe
LL	4	Sitaleki Timani	(substituted off) 64'
TP	3	Ben Alexander		(substituted off) 74'
HK	2	Tatafu Polota-Nau	(substituted off) 74'
LP	1	Benn Robinson	(substituted off) 31'	(substituted on) 74'
Substitutes:
HK	16	Saia Fainga'a	(substituted on) 74'
PR	17	James Slipper	(substituted on) 31'
FL	18	Scott Higginbotham	(substituted on) 52'
FL	19	Liam Gill	(substituted on) 64'
SH	20	Nick Phipps	(substituted on) 70'
FH	21	Mike Harris	(substituted on) 71'
CE	22	Anthony Fainga'a	(substituted on) 71'
Coach:
(New Zealand) Robbie Deans

FB	15	Zane Kirchner		(substituted off) 71'
RW	14	Bryan Habana		(substituted off) 52'
OC	13	Jean de Villiers (c)
IC	12	François Steyn
LW	11	Francois Hougaard
FH	10	Morné Steyn		(substituted off) 71'
SH	9	Ruan Pienaar
N8	8	Duane Vermeulen		(substituted off) 34'	(substituted on) 43'
OF	7	Willem Alberts
BF	6	Marcell Coetzee		(substituted off) 57'
RL	5	Juandré Kruger
LL	4	Eben Etzebeth		(substituted off) 59'
TP	3	Jannie du Plessis				(substituted off) 53'
HK	2	Adriaan Strauss		(substituted off) 75'
LP	1	Tendai Mtawarira	(yellow card) 33' to 43'
Substitutes:
HK	16	Tiaan Liebenberg		(substituted on) 75'
PR	17	Pat Cilliers		(substituted on) 34'	(substituted off) 43'	(substituted on) 53'
LK	18	Flip van der Merwe		(substituted on) 59'
FL	19	Francois Louw		(substituted on) 57'
FH	20	Johan Goosen		(substituted on) 71'
FH	21	Patrick Lambie		(substituted on) 71'
WG	22	Lwazi Mvovo		(substituted on) 52'
Coach:
(South Africa) Heyneke Meyer

Man of the Match
Berrick Barnes (Australia)

Touch judges:
Wayne Barnes (England)
Glen Jackson (New Zealand)
Television match official:
Matt Goddard (Australia)

=== Round 4 ===
15 September 2012
19:35 NZST (UTC+12)

New Zealand	21–11	South Africa
Try: Dagg 19' m A. Smith 60' c Con: Cruden (1/2) 60'; Pen: Cruden (3/5) 52', 75', 82'	Report	Try: Habana 48' m Pen: M. Steyn (1/4) 18'; Goosen (1/2) 70'

Forsyth Barr Stadium, Dunedin
Attendance: 28,982
Referee: George Clancy (Ireland)

New Zealand	South Africa

FB	15	Israel Dagg
RW	14	Cory Jane
OC	13	Conrad Smith
IC	12	Ma'a Nonu
LW	11	Julian Savea
FH	10	Aaron Cruden
SH	9	Piri Weepu	(substituted off) 40'
N8	8	Kieran Read
OF	7	Richie McCaw (c)
BF	6	Liam Messam
RL	5	Sam Whitelock
LL	4	Luke Romano	(substituted off) 50'
TP	3	Owen Franks	(substituted off) 70'
HK	2	Andrew Hore	(substituted off) 50'
LP	1	Tony Woodcock
Substitutes:
HK	16	Keven Mealamu	(substituted on) 50'
PR	17	Charlie Faumuina	(substituted on) 70'
LK	18	Brodie Retallick	(substituted on) 50'
FL	19	Victor Vito
SH	20	Aaron Smith	(substituted on) 40'
FH	21	Beauden Barrett
CE	22	Tamati Ellison
Coach:
(New Zealand) Steve Hansen

FB	15	Zane Kirchner	(substituted off) 75'
RW	14	Bryan Habana
OC	13	Jean de Villiers (c)
IC	12	François Steyn
LW	11	Francois Hougaard
FH	10	Morné Steyn	(substituted off) 59'
SH	9	Ruan Pienaar
N8	8	Duane Vermeulen
OF	7	Willem Alberts	(substituted off) 61'
BF	6	Francois Louw
RL	5	Juandré Kruger			(substituted off) 53'
LL	4	Flip van der Merwe	40' to 42'
TP	3	Jannie du Plessis
HK	2	Adriaan Strauss	(substituted off) 75'
LP	1	Tendai Mtawarira	(substituted off) 51'
Substitutes:
HK	16	Tiaan Liebenberg	(substituted on) 75'
PR	17	Dean Greyling	(substituted on) 51'	(yellow card) 64' to 74'
LK	18	Andries Bekker	(substituted on) 40'	(substituted off) 42'	(substituted on) 53'
FL	19	Marcell Coetzee	(substituted on) 61'
FH	20	Johan Goosen	(substituted on) 59'
CE	21	Juan de Jongh
FH	22	Patrick Lambie	(substituted on) 75'
Coach:
(South Africa) Heyneke Meyer

Man of the Match:
Israel Dagg (New Zealand)

Touch judges:
Romain Poite (France)
James Leckie (Australia)
Television match official:
Vinny Munro (New Zealand)

15 September 2012
20:05 AEST (UTC+10)

Australia	23–19	Argentina (1 BP)
Try: McCabe 60' c Ioane 69' c Con: Barnes (2/2) 60', 69'; Pen: Barnes (2/4) 25', 49'; Beale (1/1) 79'	Report	Try: Leonardi 50' m Cabello 52' m Pen: Hernández (3/4) 3', 29', 57'

Robina Stadium, Gold Coast
Attendance: 22,278
Referee: Wayne Barnes (England)

Australia	Argentina

FB	15	Berrick Barnes		(substituted off) 70'
RW	14	Dominic Shipperley		(substituted off) 30'	(substituted on) 40'	(substituted off) 66'
OC	13	Adam Ashley-Cooper
IC	12	Pat McCabe	(yellow card) 12' to 22'
Lw	11	Digby Ioane
FH	10	Quade Cooper
SH	9	Nick Phipps		(substituted off) 38'
N8	8	Radike Samo		(substituted off) 53'
OF	7	Michael Hooper
BF	6	Dave Dennis		(substituted off) 75'
RL	5	Nathan Sharpe (c)
LL	4	Kane Douglas
TP	3	Ben Alexander
HK	2	Tatafu Polota-Nau
LP	1	Benn Robinson		(substituted off) 30'
Substitutes:
HK	16	Saia Fainga'a
PR	17	James Slipper		(substituted on) 30'
FL	18	Scott Higginbotham		(substituted on) 53'
FL	19	Liam Gill		(substituted on) 75'
SH	20	Brett Sheehan
CE	21	Anthony Fainga'a		(substituted on) 70'
FB	22	Kurtley Beale		(substituted on) 30'	(substituted off) 40'	(substituted on) 66'
Coach:
(New Zealand) Robbie Deans

FB	15	Lucas González Amorosino
RW	14	Gonzalo Camacho	(substituted off) 40'
OC	13	Marcelo Bosch
IC	12	Santiago Fernández
LW	11	Horacio Agulla
FH	10	Juan Martín Hernández
SH	9	Martín Landajo	(substituted off) 61'
N8	8	Juan Martín Fernández Lobbe (c)
OF	7	Juan Manuel Leguizamón	(substituted off) 49'
BF	6	Julio Farías Cabello	(substituted off) 74'
RL	5	Patricio Albacete
LL	4	Manuel Carizza
TP	3	Juan Figallo	(substituted off) 40'	(substituted on) 74'
HK	2	Eusebio Guiñazú	(substituted off) 61'
LP	1	Rodrigo Roncero	(substituted off) 74'
Substitutes:
HK	16	Agustín Creevy	(substituted on) 61'
PR	17	Juan Pablo Orlandi	(substituted on) 40'
N8	18	Leonardo Senatore		(substituted on) 74'
FL	19	Tomás Leonardi	(substituted on) 49'
SH	20	Nicolás Vergallo	(substituted on) 61'
FB	21	Martín Rodríguez
WG	22	Juan Imhoff	(substituted on) 40'
Coach:
(Argentina) Santiago Phelan

Man of the Match:
Digby Ioane (Australia)

Touch judges:
Nigel Owens (Wales)
Glen Jackson (New Zealand)
Television match official:
Matt Goddard (Australia)

=== Round 5 ===
29 September 2012
17:00 SAST (UTC+02)

(1 BP) South Africa	31–8	Australia
Try: Kirchner 21' c Habana 28' c, 60' c, 78' m Louw 53' m Con: Pienaar (3/5) 22', 29', 61'	Report	Try: Harris 65' m Pen: Beale (1/2) 34'

Loftus Versfeld Stadium, Pretoria
Attendance: 44,463
Referee: Alain Rolland (Ireland)

South Africa	Australia

FB	15	Zane Kirchner	(substituted off) 55'
RW	14	Bryan Habana
OC	13	Jaco Taute	(substituted off) 75'
IC	12	Jean de Villiers (c)
LW	11	Francois Hougaard
FH	10	Johan Goosen	(substituted off) 75'
SH	9	Ruan Pienaar
N8	8	Duane Vermeulen
OF	7	Willem Alberts	(substituted off) 58'
BF	6	Francois Louw
RL	5	Andries Bekker
LL	4	Eben Etzebeth	(substituted off) 58'
TP	3	Jannie du Plessis	(substituted off) 70'
HK	2	Adriaan Strauss	(substituted off) 75'
LP	1	Tendai Mtawarira
Substitutes:
HK	16	Tiaan Liebenberg	(substituted on) 75'
PR	17	Pat Cilliers	(substituted on) 70'
LK	18	Flip van der Merwe	(substituted on) 58'
FL	19	Marcell Coetzee	(substituted on) 58'
FH	20	Elton Jantjies	(substituted on) 75'
CE	21	Juan de Jongh	(substituted on) 75'
FH	22	Patrick Lambie	(substituted on) 55'
Coach:
(South Africa) Heyneke Meyer

FB	15	Berrick Barnes				(substituted off) 31'
RW	14	Dominic Shipperley
OC	13	Adam Ashley-Cooper	(substituted off) 38'
IC	12	Pat McCabe	5' to 13'
LW	11	Digby Ioane	19' to 23'		(substituted off) 62'
FH	10	Kurtley Beale
SH	9	Nick Phipps
N8	8	Radike Samo	(substituted off) 55'
OF	7	Michael Hooper
BF	6	Dave Dennis
RL	5	Nathan Sharpe (c)
LL	4	Kane Douglas	(substituted off) 50'
TP	3	Ben Alexander		(substituted off) 67'
HK	2	Tatafu Polota-Nau
LP	1	Benn Robinson	(substituted off) 30'	(substituted on) 67'
Substitutes:
HK	16	Saia Fainga'a
PR	17	James Slipper	(substituted on) 30'	(yellow card) 52' to 62'
LK	18	Rob Simmons	(substituted on) 50'
FL	19	Liam Gill	(substituted on) 55'
SH	20	Brett Sheehan			(substituted on) 62'
FH	21	Mike Harris	(substituted on) 38'
CE	22	Anthony Fainga'a	(substituted on) 5'	(substituted off) 13' (substituted on) 19'	(substituted off) 23'	(substituted on) 31'
Coach:
(New Zealand) Robbie Deans

Man of the Match:
Bryan Habana (South Africa)

Touch judges:
Romain Poite (France)
Greg Garner (England)
Television match official:
Shaun Veldsman (South Africa)

29 September 2012
20:10 AST (UTC−03)

Argentina	15–54	New Zealand (1 BP)
Try: Landajo 7' m Camacho 47' c Con: Hernández (1/2) 47'; Pen: Hernández (1/2) 26'	Report	Try: A. Smith 15' c Jane 22' c, 50' m, 79' c Savea 30' m, 38' c Nonu 58' c Con: Carter (3/5) 15', 23', 39'; Cruden (2/2) 59', 80'; Pen: Carter (2/3) 19', 28'; Cruden (1/1) 65'

Estadio Ciudad de La Plata, La Plata
Attendance: 53,000
Referee: Jaco Peyper (South Africa)

Argentina	New Zealand

FB	15	Lucas González Amorosino	(substituted off) 66'
RW	14	Gonzalo Camacho
OC	13	Marcelo Bosch
IC	12	Santiago Fernández
LW	11	Horacio Agulla	(substituted off) 48'
FH	10	Juan Martín Hernández
SH	9	Martín Landajo
N8	8	Juan Martín Fernández Lobbe (c)
OF	7	Juan Manuel Leguizamón	(substituted off) 52'
BF	6	Julio Farías Cabello
RL	5	Patricio Albacete
LL	4	Manuel Carizza	(substituted off) 57'
TP	3	Juan Figallo	(substituted off) 67'
HK	2	Eusebio Guiñazú	(substituted off) 58'
LP	1	Rodrigo Roncero
Substitutes:
HK	16	Agustín Creevy	(substituted on) 58'
PR	17	Juan Pablo Orlandi	(substituted on) 67'
LK	18	Tomás Vallejos	(substituted on) 57'
FL	19	Tomás Leonardi	(substituted on) 52'
SH	20	Nicolás Vergallo		(substituted on) 73'
FB	21	Martín Rodríguez	(substituted on) 66'	(substituted off) 73'
WG	22	Juan Imhoff	(substituted on) 48'
Coach:
(Argentina) Santiago Phelan

FB	15	Israel Dagg
RW	14	Cory Jane
OC	13	Conrad Smith	(substituted off) 54'
IC	12	Ma'a Nonu
LW	11	Julian Savea
FH	10	Dan Carter	(substituted off) 58'
SH	9	Aaron Smith	(substituted off) 57'
N8	8	Kieran Read
OF	7	Richie McCaw (c)	(substituted off) 58'
BF	6	Liam Messam
RL	5	Sam Whitelock
LL	4	Luke Romano	5' to 16'		(substituted off) 35'
TP	3	Owen Franks	(substituted off) 57'
HK	2	Andrew Hore	(substituted off) 48'
LP	1	Tony Woodcock
Substitutes:
HK	16	Keven Mealamu	(substituted on) 48'
PR	17	Charlie Faumuina	(substituted on) 57'
LK	18	Brodie Retallick	(substituted on) 5'	(substituted off) 16'	(substituted on) 35'
FL	19	Sam Cane	(substituted on) 58'
SH	20	Piri Weepu	(substituted on) 57'
FH	21	Aaron Cruden	(substituted on) 58'
FB	22	Ben Smith	(substituted on) 54'
Coach:
(New Zealand) Steve Hansen

Man of the Match:
Kieran Read (New Zealand)

Touch judges:
Craig Joubert (South Africa)
Pascal Gaüzère (France)
Television match official:
Francisco Pastrana (Argentina)

=== Round 6 ===
6 October 2012
17:00 SAST (UTC+02)

South Africa	16–32	New Zealand (1 BP)
Try: Habana 12' c Con: Goosen (1/1) 13'; Pen: Goosen (1/3) 20'; Jantjies (2/4) 36', 39'	Report	Try: Whitelock 25' m A. Smith 33' c Nonu 41' c C. Smith 52' c Con: Carter (3/4) 33, 41, 53; Pen: Carter (1/2) 71'; Drop: Carter (1/1) 63'

FNB Stadium, Johannesburg
Attendance: 80,753
Referee: Alain Rolland (Ireland)

South Africa	New Zealand

FB	15	Zane Kirchner	(substituted off) 64'
RW	14	Bryan Habana
OC	13	Jaco Taute	(substituted off) 76'
IC	12	Jean de Villiers (c)
LW	11	Francois Hougaard
FH	10	Johan Goosen	(substituted off) 34'
SH	9	Ruan Pienaar
N8	8	Duane Vermeulen
OF	7	Willem Alberts			(substituted off) 59'
BF	6	Francois Louw	36' to 42'
RL	5	Andries Bekker
LL	4	Eben Etzebeth	(substituted off) 59'
TP	3	Jannie du Plessis	(substituted off) 53'
HK	2	Adriaan Strauss	(substituted off) 72'
LP	1	Tendai Mtawarira
Substitutes:
HK	16	Tiaan Liebenberg	(substituted on) 72'
PR	17	Coenie Oosthuizen	(substituted on) 53'
LK	18	Flip van der Merwe	(substituted on) 59'
FL	19	Marcell Coetzee	(substituted on) 36'	(substituted off) 42'	(substituted on) 59'
FH	20	Elton Jantjies	(substituted on) 34'
CE	21	Juan de Jongh	(substituted on) 76'
FH	22	Patrick Lambie	(substituted on) 64'
Coach:
(South Africa) Heyneke Meyer

FB	15	Israel Dagg	(yellow card) 66' to 76'
RW	14	Cory Jane
OC	13	Conrad Smith
IC	12	Ma'a Nonu		(substituted off) 62'
LW	11	Hosea Gear
FH	10	Dan Carter		(substituted off) 76'
SH	9	Aaron Smith		(substituted off) 65'
N8	8	Kieran Read
OF	7	Richie McCaw (c)			69' to 72'
BF	6	Liam Messam		(substituted off) 65'	(substituted on) 69'	(substituted off) 72'
RL	5	Sam Whitelock
LL	4	Brodie Retallick		(substituted off) 58'
TP	3	Owen Franks		(substituted off) 62'
HK	2	Andrew Hore		(substituted off) 51'
LP	1	Tony Woodcock
Substitutes:
HK	16	Keven Mealamu		(substituted on) 51'
PR	17	Ben Franks		(substituted on) 62'
LK	18	Luke Romano		(substituted on) 58'
FL	19	Adam Thomson		(substituted on) 65'
SH	20	Piri Weepu		(substituted on) 65'
FH	21	Aaron Cruden		(substituted on) 76'
CE	22	Tamati Ellison		(substituted on) 62'
Coach:
(New Zealand) Steve Hansen

Man of the Match:
Kieran Read (New Zealand)

Touch judges:
Romain Poite (France)
Greg Garner (England)
Television match official:
Shaun Veldsman (South Africa)

6 October 2012
20:10 AST (UTC−03)

(1 BP) Argentina	19–25	Australia
Try: Imhoff 76' c Con: Bosch (1/1) 76'; Pen: Hernández (3/4) 10', 15', 28'; Bosch (1/2) 61'	Report	Try: Ioane 63' c Con: Harris (1/1) 65'; Pen: Harris (6/9) 2', 7', 13', 23', 26', 73'

Estadio Gigante de Arroyito, Rosario
Attendance: 37,000
Referee: Craig Joubert (South Africa)

Argentina	Australia

FB	15	Lucas González Amorosino
RW	14	Gonzalo Camacho
OC	13	Marcelo Bosch
IC	12	Santiago Fernández		45' to 52'
LW	11	Horacio Agulla		(substituted off) 66'
FH	10	Juan Martín Hernández		(substituted off) 59'
SH	9	Martín Landajo
N8	8	Juan Martín Fernández Lobbe (c)
OF	7	Juan Manuel Leguizamón		(substituted off) 47'
BF	6	Julio Farías Cabello		(substituted off) 73'
RL	5	Patricio Albacete	(yellow card) 24' to 34'
LL	4	Manuel Carizza
TP	3	Juan Figallo		(substituted off) 69'
HK	2	Eusebio Guiñazú
LP	1	Rodrigo Roncero		(substituted off) 73'
Substitutes:
HK	16	Agustín Creevy		(substituted on) 62'
PR	17	Juan Pablo Orlandi		(substituted on) 69'
N8	18	Leonardo Senatore		(substituted on) 73'
FL	19	Tomás Leonardi		(substituted on) 47'
SH	20	Nicolás Vergallo
FH	21	Nicolás Sánchez		(substituted on) 45'	(substituted off) 52'	(substituted on) 59'
WG	22	Juan Imhoff		(substituted on) 66'
Coach:
(Argentina) Santiago Phelan

FB	15	Mike Harris
RW	14	Nick Cummins
OC	13	Ben Tapuai
IC	12	Pat McCabe
LW	11	Digby Ioane
FH	10	Kurtley Beale
SH	9	Nick Phipps	(substituted off) 73'
N8	8	Radike Samo	(substituted off) 62'
OF	7	Michael Hooper (c)
BF	6	Sitaleki Timani	(substituted off) 68'
RL	5	Nathan Sharpe
LL	4	Kane Douglas	(substituted off) 8'
TP	3	Ben Alexander
HK	2	Tatafu Polota-Nau
LP	1	James Slipper	(substituted off) 40'
Substitutes:
HK	16	Saia Fainga'a
PR	17	Benn Robinson	(substituted on) 40'
FL	18	Dave Dennis	(substituted on) 62'
FL	19	Scott Higginbotham	(substituted on) 8'
FL	20	Liam Gill	(substituted on) 68'
SH	21	Brett Sheehan	(substituted on) 73'	(yellow card) 74' to 80'
WG	22	Dom Shipperley
Coach:
(New Zealand) Robbie Deans

Man of the Match:
Michael Hooper (Australia)

Touch judges:
Jaco Peyper (South Africa)
Pascal Gaüzère (France)
Television match official:
Francisco Pastrana (Argentina)

== Warm up matches ==
On 4 August and 11 August, Argentina played two uncapped matches against a Stade Français team in Argentina.

4 August 2012	Argentina	21–25	Stade Français	Estadio José Amalfitani, Buenos Aires
	Try: Agulla 37' c Imhoff 48' m Con: Hernández (1/1) 38'; Pen: Hernández (3/4) 3', 24', 32'	Report (In Spanish)	Try: Sempéré 66' c Con: Sinzelle (1/1) 67'; Pen: Dupuy (4/6) 11', 15', 26', 29'; Sinzelle (2/2) 74', 78'	Referee: Francisco Pastrana (Argentina)

11 August 2012	Argentina	31–17	Stade Français	Estadio B. G. Estanislao López, Santa Fe
	Try: Carizza 36' m Agulla 69' c Imhoff 76' c Con: Hernández 70', 77'; Pen: Hernández 8', 13', 38', 59'	Report (In Spanish)	Try: Bonneval 25' c P. Williams 55' c Con: Fillol 26', 56'; Pen: Fillol 53'	Referee: Francisco Pastrana (Argentina)

== Squads ==
=== Summary ===
Nation	Match venues			Head coach	Captain
Nation	Name	City	Capacity	Head coach	Captain
Argentina	Estadio Ciudad de La Plata	La Plata	53,000	(Argentina) Santiago Phelan	Juan Martín Fernández Lobbe
Argentina	Estadio Gigante de Arroyito	Rosario	41,654	(Argentina) Santiago Phelan	Juan Martín Fernández Lobbe
Argentina	Estadio Malvinas Argentinas	Mendoza	40,268	(Argentina) Santiago Phelan	Juan Martín Fernández Lobbe
Australia	ANZ Stadium	Sydney	84,000	(New Zealand) Robbie Deans	David Pocock; Will Genia; Nathan Sharpe (Note: An injury sustained by original captain David Pocock meant he was ruled out of the championship after round 1. This thus made scrum-half Will Genia captain from round 2 onwards. However, an injury to his leg in round 3 meant he was unable to continue to play in the championship. Nathan Sharpe was named captain for the remaining round of the tournament.)
Australia	Patersons Stadium	Perth	43,500	(New Zealand) Robbie Deans	David Pocock; Will Genia; Nathan Sharpe
Australia	Skilled Park	Gold Coast	27,400	(New Zealand) Robbie Deans	David Pocock; Will Genia; Nathan Sharpe
New Zealand	Eden Park	Auckland	50,000	(New Zealand) Steve Hansen	Richie McCaw
New Zealand	Westpac Stadium	Wellington	36,000	(New Zealand) Steve Hansen	Richie McCaw
New Zealand	Forsyth Barr Stadium	Dunedin	30,748	(New Zealand) Steve Hansen	Richie McCaw
South Africa	FNB Stadium	Johannesburg	94,736	(South Africa) Heyneke Meyer	Jean de Villiers
South Africa	Newlands Stadium	Cape Town	51,900	(South Africa) Heyneke Meyer	Jean de Villiers
South Africa	Loftus Versfeld	Pretoria	51,762	(South Africa) Heyneke Meyer	Jean de Villiers

Note: Ages are as of 18 August 2012 – the starting date of the tournament.

=== Argentina ===
Head coach: (Argentina) Santiago Phelan

Note: Flags indicate national union for the club/province as defined by World Rugby.

Player	Position	Date of birth (age)	Caps	Club/province
Agustín Creevy	Hooker	15 March 1985 (aged 27)	16	(France) Montpellier
Eusebio Guiñazú	Hooker	15 January 1982 (aged 30)	18	(France) Biarritz
Bruno Postiglioni	Hooker	4 August 1987 (aged 25)	6	(Argentina) La Plata
Marcos Ayerza	Prop	12 January 1983 (aged 29)	34	(England) Leicester Tigers
Maximiliano Bustos	Prop	2 April 1986 (aged 26)	0	(France) Montpellier
Juan Figallo	Prop	25 March 1988 (aged 24)	9	(France) Montpellier
Juan Pablo Orlandi	Prop	20 June 1983 (aged 29)	9	(France) Racing Métro
Rodrigo Roncero	Prop	16 February 1977 (aged 35)	49	(France) Stade Français
Patricio Albacete	Lock	2 September 1981 (aged 30)	46	(France) Toulouse
Julio Farías Cabello	Lock	9 September 1978 (aged 33)	10	(Argentina) Tucumán
Manuel Carizza	Lock	23 August 1984 (aged 27)	23	(France) Biarritz
Tomás Vallejos	Lock	16 October 1984 (aged 27)	1	(Wales) Scarlets
Tomás de la Vega	Flanker	28 September 1990 (aged 21)	5	(Argentina) C.U.B.A.
Álvaro Galindo	Flanker	26 February 1982 (aged 30)	11	(France) Racing Métro
Juan Manuel Leguizamón	Flanker	6 June 1983 (aged 29)	34	(France) Lyon
Tomás Leonardi	Flanker	1 July 1987 (aged 25)	7	(Argentina) S.I.C.
Juan Martín Fernández Lobbe (c)	Number 8	19 September 1981 (aged 30)	43	(France) Toulon
Leonardo Senatore	Number 8	13 May 1984 (aged 28)	9	(France) Toulon
Tomás Cubelli	Scrum-half	12 June 1989 (aged 23)	10	(Argentina) Belgrano Athletic
Agustín Figuerola	Scrum-half	27 January 1985 (aged 27)	7	(France) Brive
Nicolás Vergallo	Scrum-half	20 August 1983 (aged 28)	24	(France) Toulouse
Santiago Fernández	Fly-half	28 November 1985 (aged 26)	18	(France) Montpellier
Juan Martín Hernández	Fly-half	7 August 1982 (aged 30)	32	(France) Racing Métro
Martín Landajo	Fly-half	14 June 1986 (aged 26)	6	(Argentina) C.A.S.I.
Marcelo Bosch	Centre	7 January 1984 (aged 28)	10	(France) Biarritz
Rafael Carballo	Centre	16 October 1981 (aged 30)	9	(France) Bordeaux
Martín Rodríguez	Centre	27 April 1985 (aged 27)	15	(France) Stade Français
Nicolás Sánchez	Centre	26 October 1988 (aged 23)	3	(France) Bordeaux
Horacio Agulla	Wing	22 October 1984 (aged 27)	34	(England) Bath
Gonzalo Camacho	Wing	28 August 1984 (aged 27)	11	(England) Exeter
Juan Imhoff	Wing	11 May 1988 (aged 24)	8	(France) Racing Métro
Manuel Montero	Wing	20 November 1991 (aged 20)	6	(Argentina) Pucará
Martín Bustos Moyano	Fullback	12 July 1985 (aged 27)	1	(France) Montpellier
Lucas González Amorosino	Fullback	11 February 1985 (aged 27)	14	(France) Montpellier

=== Australia ===
Head coach': (New Zealand) Robbie Deans

Note: Flags indicate national union for the club/province as defined by World Rugby.

Player	Position	Date of birth (age)	Caps	Club/province
Saia Fainga'a	Hooker	2 February 1987 (aged 25)	7	(Australia) Reds
Stephen Moore	Hooker	20 January 1983 (aged 29)	70	(Australia) Brumbies
Tatafu Polota-Nau	Hooker	26 July 1985 (aged 27)	35	(Australia) Waratahs
Ben Alexander	Prop	13 November 1984 (aged 27)	40	(Australia) Brumbies
Sekope Kepu	Prop	5 February 1985 (aged 27)	17	(Australia) Waratahs
Benn Robinson	Prop	19 July 1984 (aged 28)	45	(Australia) Waratahs
James Slipper	Prop	6 June 1989 (aged 23)	23	(Australia) Reds
Kane Douglas	Lock	1 June 1989 (aged 23)	0	(Australia) Waratahs
Nathan Sharpe	Lock	26 February 1978 (aged 34)	105	(Australia) Western Force
Rob Simmons	Lock	19 April 1989 (aged 23)	20	(Australia) Reds
Sitaleki Timani	Lock	19 September 1987 (aged 24)	3	(Australia) Waratahs
Dave Dennis	Flanker	20 January 1986 (aged 26)	4	(Australia) Waratahs
Liam Gill	Flanker	8 June 1992 (aged 20)	0	(Australia) Reds
Michael Hooper	Flanker	29 October 1991 (aged 20)	3	(Australia) Brumbies
David Pocock (c)	Flanker	23 April 1988 (aged 24)	44	(Australia) Western Force
Jake Schatz	Flanker	23 July 1990 (aged 22)	0	(Australia) Reds
Scott Higginbotham	Number 8	5 September 1986 (aged 25)	15	(Australia) Reds
Radike Samo	Number 8	9 July 1976 (aged 36)	16	(Australia) Reds
Will Genia	Scrum-half	17 January 1988 (aged 24)	38	(Australia) Reds
Nick Phipps	Scrum-half	9 January 1989 (aged 23)	3	(Australia) Melbourne Rebels
Nic White	Scrum-half	13 June 1990 (aged 22)	0	(Australia) Brumbies
Berrick Barnes	Fly-half	28 May 1986 (aged 26)	41	(Australia) Waratahs
Quade Cooper	Fly-half	5 April 1988 (aged 24)	35	(Australia) Reds
Anthony Fainga'a	Centre	2 February 1987 (aged 25)	18	(Australia) Reds
Mike Harris	Centre	8 July 1988 (aged 24)	2	(Australia) Reds
Rob Horne	Centre	15 August 1989 (aged 23)	12	(Australia) Waratahs
Adam Ashley-Cooper	Wing	27 March 1984 (aged 28)	64	(Australia) Waratahs
Digby Ioane	Wing	14 July 1985 (aged 27)	25	(Australia) Reds
Drew Mitchell	Wing	26 March 1984 (aged 28)	58	(Australia) Waratahs
Kurtley Beale	Fullback	6 January 1989 (aged 23)	24	(Australia) Melbourne Rebels

=== New Zealand ===
- Head coach: (New Zealand) Steve Hansen
- Caps Updated 24/06/2012

Note: Flags indicate national union for the club/province as defined by World Rugby.

Player	Position	Date of birth (age)	Caps	Club/province
Andrew Hore	Hooker	13 September 1978 (aged 33)	65	(New Zealand) Highlanders
Keven Mealamu	Hooker	20 March 1979 (aged 33)	93	(New Zealand) Blues
Wyatt Crockett	Prop	24 January 1983 (aged 29)	6	(New Zealand) Crusaders
Charlie Faumuina	Prop	24 December 1986 (aged 25)	0	(New Zealand) Blues
Ben Franks	Prop	27 March 1984 (aged 28)	18	(New Zealand) Crusaders
Owen Franks	Prop	23 December 1987 (aged 24)	34	(New Zealand) Crusaders
Tony Woodcock	Prop	27 January 1981 (aged 31)	86	(New Zealand) Blues
Brodie Retallick	Lock	31 May 1991 (aged 21)	3	(New Zealand) Chiefs
Luke Romano	Lock	16 February 1986 (aged 26)	1	(New Zealand) Crusaders
Sam Whitelock	Lock	12 October 1988 (aged 23)	28	(New Zealand) Crusaders
Sam Cane	Flanker	13 January 1992 (aged 20)	2	(New Zealand) Chiefs
Richie McCaw (c)	Flanker	31 December 1980 (aged 31)	106	(New Zealand) Crusaders
Liam Messam	Flanker	25 March 1984 (aged 28)	10	(New Zealand) Chiefs
Adam Thomson	Flanker	13 March 1982 (aged 30)	27	(New Zealand) Highlanders
Kieran Read	Number 8	26 October 1985 (aged 26)	38	(New Zealand) Crusaders
Victor Vito	Number 8	27 March 1987 (aged 25)	14	(New Zealand) Hurricanes
Aaron Smith	Scrum-half	21 November 1988 (aged 23)	3	(New Zealand) Highlanders
Piri Weepu	Scrum-half	7 September 1983 (aged 28)	59	(New Zealand) Blues
Dan Carter	Fly-half	5 March 1982 (aged 30)	87	(New Zealand) Crusaders
Aaron Cruden	Fly-half	8 January 1989 (aged 23)	11	(New Zealand) Chiefs
Tamati Ellison	Centre	1 April 1983 (aged 29)	2	(New Zealand) Highlanders
Ma'a Nonu	Centre	21 May 1982 (aged 30)	66	(New Zealand) Blues
Conrad Smith	Centre	12 October 1981 (aged 30)	58	(New Zealand) Hurricanes
Sonny Bill Williams	Centre	3 August 1985 (aged 27)	17	(New Zealand) Chiefs
Hosea Gear	Wing	16 March 1984 (aged 28)	9	(New Zealand) Highlanders
Cory Jane	Wing	8 February 1983 (aged 29)	32	(New Zealand) Hurricanes
Julian Savea	Wing	7 August 1990 (aged 22)	2	(New Zealand) Hurricanes
Israel Dagg	Fullback	6 June 1988 (aged 24)	15	(New Zealand) Crusaders
Ben Smith	Fullback	1 June 1986 (aged 26)	5	(New Zealand) Highlanders

=== South Africa ===
Head coach:' (South Africa) Heyneke Meyer

Note: Flags indicate national union for the club/province as defined by World Rugby.

Player	Position	Date of birth (age)	Caps	Club/province
Craig Burden	Hooker	13 May 1985 (aged 27)	0	(South Africa) Sharks
Tiaan Liebenberg	Hooker	18 December 1981 (aged 30)	1	(South Africa) Stormers
Adriaan Strauss	Hooker	18 November 1985 (aged 26)	14	(South Africa) Cheetahs
Pat Cilliers	Prop	3 March 1987 (aged 25)	2	(South Africa) Lions
Jannie du Plessis	Prop	16 November 1982 (aged 29)	35	(South Africa) Sharks
Dean Greyling	Prop	1 January 1986 (aged 26)	2	(South Africa) Bulls
Tendai Mtawarira	Prop	1 August 1985 (aged 27)	37	(South Africa) Sharks
Andries Bekker	Lock	5 December 1983 (aged 28)	26	(South Africa) Stormers
Eben Etzebeth	Lock	29 October 1991 (aged 20)	5	(South Africa) Stormers
Juandré Kruger	Lock	6 September 1985 (aged 26)	3	(South Africa) Bulls
Flip van der Merwe	Lock	3 June 1985 (aged 27)	15	(South Africa) Bulls
Marcell Coetzee	Flanker	8 May 1991 (aged 21)	5	(South Africa) Sharks
Francois Louw	Flanker	15 June 1985 (aged 27)	10	(England) Bath
Jacques Potgieter	Flanker	24 April 1986 (aged 26)	3	(South Africa) Bulls
Willem Alberts	Number 8	11 May 1984 (aged 28)	11	(South Africa) Sharks
Duane Vermeulen	Number 8	3 July 1986 (aged 26)	0	(South Africa) Stormers
Francois Hougaard	Scrum-half	6 April 1988 (aged 24)	20	(South Africa) Bulls
Ruan Pienaar	Scrum-half	10 March 1984 (aged 28)	56	(Republic of Ireland) Ulster
Jano Vermaak	Scrum-half	1 January 1985 (aged 27)	0	(South Africa) Bulls
Johan Goosen	Fly-half	27 July 1992 (aged 20)	0	(South Africa) Cheetahs
Morné Steyn	Fly-half	11 July 1984 (aged 28)	39	(South Africa) Bulls
Juan de Jongh	Centre	15 April 1988 (aged 24)	10	(South Africa) Stormers
Jean de Villiers (c)	Centre	24 February 1981 (aged 31)	77	(South Africa) Stormers
François Steyn	Centre	14 May 1987 (aged 25)	49	(South Africa) Sharks
Bryan Habana	Wing	12 June 1983 (aged 29)	79	(South Africa) Stormers
Lwazi Mvovo	Wing	3 June 1986 (aged 26)	6	(South Africa) Sharks
Zane Kirchner	Fullback	16 June 1984 (aged 28)	17	(South Africa) Bulls
Patrick Lambie	Fullback	17 October 1990 (aged 21)	13	(South Africa) Sharks

== Statistics ==
=== Try scorers ===
Pos	Name	Team	Tries
1	Bryan Habana	South Africa	7
2	Cory Jane	New Zealand	5
3	Aaron Smith	New Zealand	3
3	Israel Dagg	New Zealand	3
3	Julian Savea	New Zealand	3
6	Digby Ioane	Australia	2
6	Ma'a Nonu	New Zealand	2
6	Zane Kirchner	South Africa	2
9	Ben Alexander	Australia	1
9	Conrad Smith	New Zealand	1
9	Francois Louw	South Africa	1
9	François Steyn	South Africa	1
9	Gonzalo Camacho	Argentina	1
9	Julio Farías Cabello	Argentina	1
9	Juan Imhoff	Argentina	1
9	Mike Harris	Australia	1
9	Marcell Coetzee	South Africa	1
9	Martín Landajo	Argentina	1
9	Nathan Sharpe	Australia	1
9	Pat McCabe	Australia	1
9	Rodrigo Roncero	Argentina	1
9	Sam Whitelock	New Zealand	1
9	Santiago Fernández	Argentina	1
9	Scott Higginbotham	Australia	1
9	Tomás Leonardi	Argentina	1

=== Points scorers ===
Pos	Name	Team	Pts
1	Dan Carter	New Zealand	58
2	Berrick Barnes	Australia	40
3	Bryan Habana	South Africa	35
4	Morné Steyn	South Africa	34
5	Aaron Cruden	New Zealand	29
5	Juan Martín Hernández	Argentina	29
7	Cory Jane	New Zealand	25
7	Mike Harris	Australia	25
9	Aaron Smith	New Zealand	15
9	Israel Dagg	New Zealand	15
9	Julian Savea	New Zealand	15

== See also ==
- History of rugby union matches between Argentina and Australia
- History of rugby union matches between Argentina and New Zealand
- History of rugby union matches between Argentina and South Africa
- History of rugby union matches between Australia and South Africa
- History of rugby union matches between Australia and New Zealand
- History of rugby union matches between New Zealand and South Africa
