= Ravuama Samo =

Fijian rugby union player (born 1979)

- Born: 19 August 1979 (age 47) Nadi, Fiji
- Height: 6 ft 2 in (1.88 m)
- Weight: 276 lb (125 kg)
- Notable relative: Radike Samo (brother)

Rugby union career
- Position: Prop
Senior career
Years	Team	Apps	(Points)
- Coastal Stallions
–	Western Crusaders		
–	Cornish Pirates		
International career
Years	Team	Apps	(Points)
2005–2006	Fiji	6	(0)

Ravuama Samo (born 19 August 1979 in Nadi, Fiji) is a Fijian rugby union player. He plays prop. He is 1.88 m tall and weighs 125 kg.

He was selected for Fijian team in June 2004, but he only debuted in the summer of 2005 versus Tonga. Overall, he played six matches for his national side, scoring no points.

He is a brother of an Australian international, Radike Samo.
