= Juan Manuel Leguizamón =

Argentine rugby union player (born 1983)

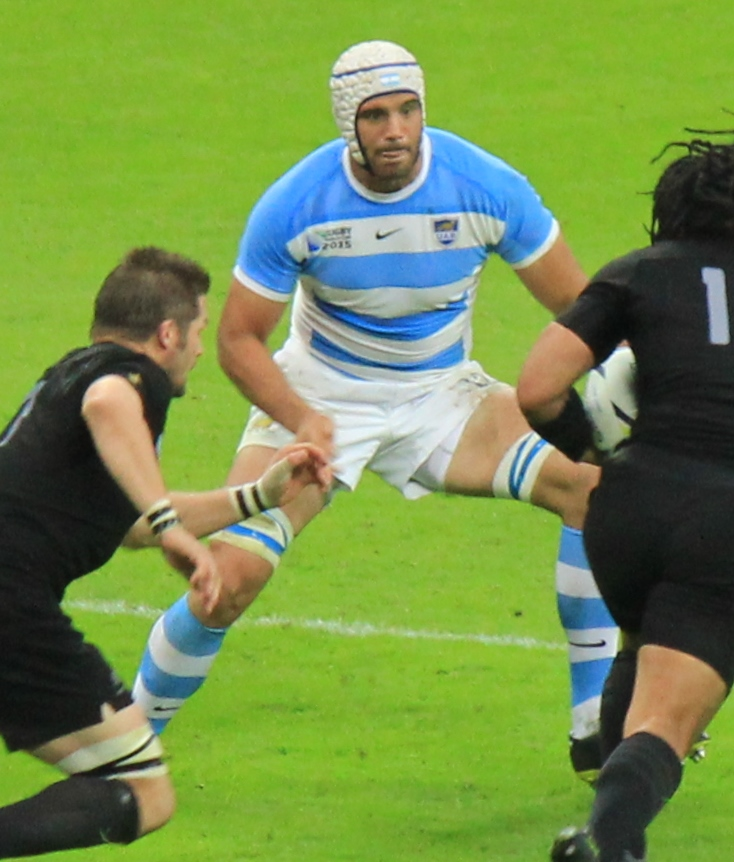
- Leguizamón playing with Argentina v New Zealand at the 2015 WC
- Born: Juan Manuel Leguizamón; 6 June 1983 (age 43) Santiago del Estero, Argentina
- Height: 1.90 m (6 ft 3 in)
- Weight: 104 kg (16 st 5 lb; 229 lb)

Rugby union career
- Position: Flanker or Number eight
Amateur team(s)
Years	Team	Apps	(Points)
- SIC
–	Santiago Lawn Tennis Club		
Senior career
Years	Team	Apps	(Points)
2005–08	London Irish	60	(40)
2008–11	Stade Français	66	(30)
2011–15	Lyon OU	61	(35)
2020	Seattle Seawolves	0	(0)
2021-	Rugby United NY	1	(0)
- Correct as of 8 July 2021
Provincial / State sides
Years	Team	Apps	(Points)
- Buenos Aires
Super Rugby
Years	Team	Apps	(Points)
2016−2019	Jaguares	33	(5)
- Correct as of 22 July 2021
International career
Years	Team	Apps	(Points)
2002	Argentina U19		
2003–04	Argentina U21		
2005–2019	Argentina	87	(65)
- Correct as of 18 September 2019

Juan Manuel Leguizamón (born 6 June 1983) is an Argentine rugby union footballer for Rugby United New York (RUNY) of Major League Rugby (MLR). He plays as a flanker or a number eight.

Leguizamón previously played for the Jaguares, the Argentine side which made its debut in Super Rugby for the 2016 season.

He first played for Santiago Lawn Tennis Club, playing for San Isidro Club in 2003–04, where he won two URBA championships. He also played for the London Irish (2005–06, 2007–08) in England, and for Stade Français (2008–09, 2010–11) as well as Lyon OU (2011–15) in the Top 14 and Pro D2 leagues of France.

Leguizamón played 87 tests for Argentina from 2005 to 2019, including four Rugby World Cups and also captaining the team three times in his career.

== International career ==
Leguizamón made his debut with Los Pumas in April 2005 in a match against Japan, won 68 to 36 in Buenos Aires. On his debut, he also scored his first try for Argentina. He earned another two caps in July in a Test series against Italy, and then went on to play in three tests matches during November; against South Africa, and coming on as a replacement during the Scotland and Italy fixtures. The following year he played in two tests during the June fixtures at home to Wales and the All Blacks. He also played in games during Argentina's qualification for the 2007 Rugby World Cup and before the quarter-finals, Leguizamón dominated the World Cup group stage. This was emphasised with his monstrous work rate during the first game of the tournament against the hosts France. His yellow boots make him easy to spot.

Leguizamón went on to be part of the Argentine squad for three more World Cups, the 2011 Rugby World Cup in New Zealand, 2015 Rugby World Cup in England and 2019 Rugby World Cup in Japan.

Having been supplanted from the starting lineup, by Javier Ortega Desio, during the 2018 Rugby Championship, Leguizamón announced that he would retire from all forms of rugby following the 2019 World Cup.

On October 9, 2019, he played his last test for the Argentina national team, a 47–17 win over the United States. Leguizamón finished his career under Head Coach, Mario Ledesma, a former teammate, and finished as the joint second-to-most capped Argentinian player of all time, tied with Felipe Contepomi and second to Agustin Creevy.

In May 2021, Leguizamón signed with Rugby United New York (RUNY) of Major League Rugby in America for the rest of the 2021 season.
