= Cory Jane =

New Zealand rugby union player

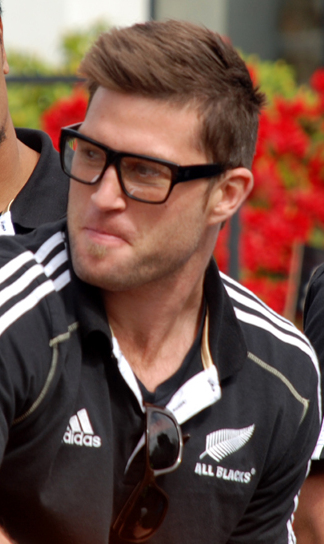
- Jane during the World Cup parade, October 2011
- Full name: Cory Steven Jane
- Born: 8 February 1983 (age 43) Lower Hutt, New Zealand
- Height: 183 cm (6 ft 0 in)
- Weight: 91 kg (201 lb; 14 st 5 lb)
- School: Heretaunga College

Rugby union career
- Position(s): Wing, Fullback
Senior career
Years	Team	Apps	(Points)
2003–2015	Wellington	65	(125)
2004	Hawke's Bay	9	(51)
2007–2017	Hurricanes	123	(160)
2016–2017	Toshiba Brave Lupus	14	(15)
- Correct as of 08 December 2024
International career
Years	Team	Apps	(Points)
2006	New Zealand Māori	2	(15)
2007	Junior All Blacks	4	(5)
2008–2014	New Zealand	55	(90)
- Correct as of 08 December 2024
National sevens team
Years	Team		Comps
2005–2007	New Zealand		
- Correct as of 08 December 2024
Coaching career
- Years: Team
- 2020–: Hurricanes (assistant)
- Correct as of 08 December 2024
Medal record
Men's rugby sevens
Representing New Zealand
Commonwealth Games
Gold medal – first place	2006 Melbourne	Team competition

Cory Steven Jane (born 8 February 1983) is a former New Zealand international rugby union player and current assistant coach. He was a part of the World Cup winning squad in the 2011 Rugby World Cup.

He first played for the All Blacks in 2008 and plays as a winger. In 2011 Jane was selected into the Tri Nations team as injury cover. A few weeks later he made the Rugby World Cup squad of 30 after tight competition in the back three.

== Career ==
Born in Lower Hutt, New Zealand, Jane played for Wellington in the Mitre 10 Cup and for the Wellington Hurricanes in Super Rugby. He has previously played for Hawke's Bay and was in the New Zealand team that won the Rugby Sevens gold medal at the 2006 Commonwealth Games. Of Ngāti Kahungunu descent, Jane represented New Zealand Māori in 2006.

Jane was third-equal on the 2006 Air New Zealand Cup leading try scorer's list with 6 tries, behind Richard Kahui (8 tries) and Sitiveni Sivivatu (7 tries), both from Waikato.

He was a member of the 2011 Rugby World Cup winning All Blacks. A few days before New Zealand's quarter-final game against Argentina, Jane and fellow All Black Israel Dagg were found "acting curiously" at a Takapuna bar after having a competition between themselves to see who could stay awake the longest after taking sleeping pills.

In 2012 he played on the wing for the Hurricanes. He was not included in the 2012 All Blacks team for the series against Ireland due to injury, but was selected again for 2012 Rugby Championship and was part of the side that beat Australia in the first two tests of the Bledisloe Cup. Jane also played in the All Blacks for 2012 End-of-Year Tour, in which they beat Scotland, Wales and Italy.

Jane suffered a serious leg injury in January 2013, preventing his involvement in Super Rugby and the series against France held in June. In October 2013, he was recalled into the All Blacks team after two games for Wellington in the ITM Cup. He was later named on the right wing in the Final Bledisloe Cup match. but ruled out on the 11th hour due to an injury and subsequently replaced by Charles Piutau. He was added to the All Blacks squad for the 2013 end-of-year rugby union tests. He returned to international rugby after being named on the right wing against France.

Jane narrowly missed out on being picked for New Zealand's 2015 Rugby World Cup squad.

Since retiring in 2017, Jane has taken up a position as the assistant coach for the Hurricanes.

== Career statistics ==
=== Club summary ===
Club	Season	Competition	Apps	Try	Con	Pen	Points
Wellington	2003	National Provincial Championship	2	0	0	0	0
Wellington	2005	National Provincial Championship	1	0	0	0	0
Wellington	2006	Air New Zealand Cup	11	6	0	0	30
Wellington	2007	Air New Zealand Cup	13	5	0	0	25
Wellington	2008	Air New Zealand Cup	12	6	0	0	30
Wellington	2009	Air New Zealand Cup	6	2	0	0	10
Wellington	2011	ITM Cup	2	0	0	0	0
Wellington	2013	ITM Cup	2	0	0	0	0
Wellington	2015	ITM Cup	11	4	0	0	20
Wellington	Total		65	25	0	0	125
Hawke's Bay	2004	National Provincial Championship	9	8	3	1	49
Hawke's Bay	Total		9	8	3	1	49
Hurricanes	2007	Super 14	13	3	0	0	15
Hurricanes	2008	Super 14	12	2	0	0	10
Hurricanes	2009	Super 14	10	3	0	0	15
Hurricanes	2010	Super 14	12	4	0	0	20
Hurricanes	2011	Super Rugby	10	2	0	0	10
Hurricanes	2012	Super Rugby	12	3	0	0	15
Hurricanes	2014	Super Rugby	13	4	0	0	20
Hurricanes	2015	Super Rugby	12	3	0	0	15
Hurricanes	2016	Super Rugby	17	6	0	0	30
Hurricanes	2017	Super Rugby	9	2	0	0	10
Hurricanes	Total		121	32	0	0	160
Career total			195	65	3	1	334

=== List of international tries ===
Try	Opposing team	Location	Venue	Competition	Date	Result
1	Australia	Wellington, New Zealand	Westpac Stadium	2009 Tri Nations Series	19 September 2009	won
2	France	Marseille, France	Stade Velodrome	2009 Mid-year series	28 November 2009	won
3	Wales	Dunedin, New Zealand	Carisbrook	2010 Mid-year series	19 June 2010	won
4	Wales	Waikato, New Zealand	Waikato Stadium	2010 Mid-year series	26 June 2010	won
5	Australia	Melbourne, Australia	Etihad Stadium	2010 Tri Nations Series	31 July 2010	won
6	Australia	So Kon Po, Hong Kong	Hong Kong Stadium	2010 Bledisloe Cup	30 October 2010	lost
7	South Africa	Wellington, New Zealand	Westpac Stadium	2011 Tri Nations Series	30 July 2011	won
8	South Africa	Wellington, New Zealand	Westpac Stadium	2011 Tri Nations Series	30 July 2011	won
9	France	Auckland, New Zealand	Eden Park	2011 Rugby World Cup	24 September 2011	won
10	Australia	Sydney, Australia	ANZ Stadium	2012 Rugby Championship	19 August 2012	won
11	Argentina	Wellington, New Zealand	Westpac Stadium	2012 Rugby Championship	8 September 2012	won
12	Argentina	La Plata, Argentina	Estadio Ciudad de La Plata	2012 Rugby Championship	29 September 2012	won
13	Argentina	La Plata, Argentina	Estadio Ciudad de La Plata	2012 Rugby Championship	29 September 2012	won
14	Argentina	La Plata, Argentina	Estadio Ciudad de La Plata	2012 Rugby Championship	29 September 2012	won
15	Scotland	Edinburgh, Scotland	Murrayfield Stadium	2012 End-of-year series	11 November 2012	won
16	Italy	Rome, Italy	Stadio Olimpico	2012 End-of-year series	17 November 2012	won
17	Australia	Brisbane, Australia	Suncorp Stadium	2014 Bledisloe Cup	18 October 2014	won
18	United States	Chicago, United States Of America	Soldier Field	2014 End-of-year series	1 November 2014	won
