= Santiago Phelan =

Argentine rugby union player and coach

- Born: March 31, 1974 (age 52) San Isidro, Argentina
- Height: 1.87 m (6 ft 2 in)
- Weight: 92 kg (14 st 7 lb)

Rugby union career
- Position: Flanker
Senior career
Years	Team	Apps	(Points)
1992–2003	Club Atlético San Isidro		
- Correct as of 25 September 2007
International career
Years	Team	Apps	(Points)
1997–2003	Argentina	43	(5)
- Correct as of 25 September 2007
Coaching career
- Years: Team
- 2008-2013: Argentina

Santiago Phelan (born March 31, 1974, in San Isidro, Buenos Aires) is an Argentine retired rugby union footballer. His usual position was flanker.

Phelan played for Argentine club Club Atlético San Isidro and represented the Argentina national rugby union team on 44 occasions, captaining the team twice. He represented Argentina at the 1999 and 2003 Rugby World Cups. Phelan retired due to injury in 2003 at the age of 29, he has since taken up coaching.

On March 13, 2008, Phelan was named as the coach of the Argentine rugby union team, filling the vacancy left by Marcelo Loffreda.

On October 21, 2013, Phelan stepped down from his post as Los Pumas head coach with immediate effect, one year early from the end of his contract. Over the 45 matches that he coached, he earned 13 wins, 31 defeats and 1 draw in his 5-year tenure. Since talking over in 2008, he has rarely earned successes. Argentina failed to get a test series victory under Phelan, with a draw against Scotland in 2008 and England in 2009, before losing 2–0 to Scotland in 2010. In 2012, Argentina again drew a test series against France, then losing 2–0 to England in 2013 including a record 32–3 defeat in the opening test, the biggest losing margin Argentina has had against England on home soil. He did lead Argentina to the occasional "upset", including a 9–6 win over Scotland at Murrayfield Stadium in Edinburgh and a 26–12 win over Wales, who at the time where the Six Nations Grand Slam Champions, at the Millennium Stadium in Cardiff.

He led the Pumas to the 2011 Rugby World Cup knockout stage, but lost to hosts New Zealand in the Quarter Finals. In 2012, Phelan led Argentina into their debut year in The Rugby Championship, and proved hard to beat when home. He led Argentina to a 16–16 draw against South Africa at home in round 2, but failed to improve on that draw, ending bottom of the table with just 4 points and no wins.

In 2013 the pumas had record defeats, starting with the 73–13 defeat to South Africa in the opening round - which was South Africa's biggest winning margin over Argentina. Like in 2012, they came close to beating South Africa at home, but their discipline proved costly with 5 penalties against them, South Africa won 22–17. In Round 4, they came close to beating Australia in Perth after losing the match 14–13, but in the corresponding home fixture, Argentina lost 54–17 to Australia, a record losing margin against Australia at home.

In October 2013, Phelan resigned as Argentina head coach after five and a half years in charge. Under Phelan, Argentina won 13, drew one and lost 31 of the 45 matches.

Phelan has paternal Irish ancestry.

== Business activities ==
He was president of Will Der Group, a company that manufactured sports apparel for Adidas, Puma, and Macron. It had plants in General Pacheco and Las Flores, Buenos Aires Province. In August 2026, Phelan announced the closure of the company and the layoff of 120 workers.

Preceded by Marcelo Loffreda	Argentina rugby union coach with Fabián Turnes; 2008–2013	Succeeded by Daniel Hourcade
