= Zane Kirchner =

South African rugby union player

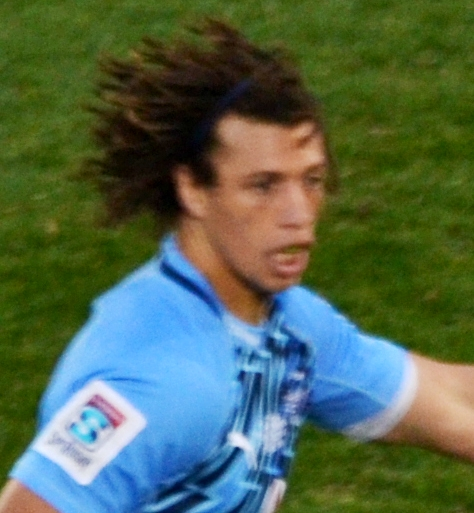
- Born: Zane Kirchner; 16 June 1984 (age 42) George, Western Cape, South Africa
- Height: 1.84 m (6 ft 1/2 in)
- Weight: 92 kg (203 lb; 14 st 7 lb)
- School: P. W. Botha College, George

Rugby union career
- Position(s): Fullback; Centre; Wing
Provincial / State sides
Years	Team	Apps	(Points)
2003–2007	Griquas	58	(175)
2008–2012	Blue Bulls	43	(34)
2013–2017	Leinster	87	(65)
2017–2019	Dragons	27	(24)
2018	Bristol Bears	3	(0)
- Correct as of 28 May 2018
Super Rugby
Years	Team	Apps	(Points)
2008–2013	Bulls	82	(105)
- Correct as of 28 July 2013
International career
Years	Team	Apps	(Points)
2009	Emerging Springboks	1	(0)
2009–2015	South Africa	31	(25)
- Correct as of 19 September 2015
Medal record
Men's Rugby union
Representing South Africa
Rugby World Cup
Bronze medal – third place	2015 England	Squad

Zane Kirchner (born 16 June 1984) is a retired South African professional rugby union player. Previously he played at fullback for the Bulls in Super Rugby and the Blue Bulls in the Currie Cup. Born in George, Western Cape, Kirchner attended PW Botha College in his home town, for whom he played at fly-half; he was first selected at fullback for the 2002 Craven Week. He began his provincial rugby career with the Griquas, and made more than 50 appearances for the side between his Currie Cup debut in 2003 and his move to the Blue Bulls in 2007. In five years with the Blue Bulls, Kirchner has made 64 Currie Cup appearances and scored 64 points. He made his debut for the Bulls (Super Rugby) franchise in 2008, and since then he has made a total of 81 appearances and scored 105 points. He won the Currie Cup in 2009 and the Super Rugby title in 2009 and 2010.

In April 2013, it was announced that Kirchner would be leaving the Bulls to join Irish team Leinster on a two-year deal.

On 31 May 2014, Kirchner scored two tries as Leinster won the Pro-12 final to take the 2013–14 title.

On 7 March 2017, Kirchner signed for Welsh region and Pro12 rivals the Dragons ahead of the 2017–18 season.
