= Gonzalo Camacho =

Argentine rugby union player (born 1984)

- Born: Gonzalo Oscar Camacho; 28 August 1984 (age 42) Buenos Aires, Argentina
- Height: 173 cm (5 ft 8 in)
- Weight: 85 kg (13 st 5 lb; 187 lb)

Rugby union career
- Position(s): Wing, Centre
Amateur team(s)
Years	Team	Apps	(Points)
–	Buenos Aires		
Senior career
Years	Team	Apps	(Points)
2009–2011	Harlequins	30	(20)
2011–2013	Exeter	26	(15)
2013–2016	Leicester	4	(0)
International career
Years	Team	Apps	(Points)
2008–2015	Argentina	24	(30)
National sevens team
Years	Team		Comps
2005–2009	Argentina		15

Gonzalo Oscar Camacho (born 28 August 1984 in Buenos Aires) is a retired Argentine rugby union rugby player, who played for Leicester Tigers, Exeter Chiefs, Harlequins and Argentina on the wing.

== Club career ==
Gonzalo signed for Devon side Exeter Chiefs on 15 June 2011 having also previously played for Harlequins between 2009 and 2011, Camacho is held in high regards by Harlequins fans after scoring the winning try in against Stade Français in the Amlin Cup final. After much speculation it was announced on 29 May 2013 that Camacho will be leaving Exeter Chiefs and will be joining Leicester Tigers.

== International career ==
Gonzalo made his debut for Argentina against Uruguay on 31 May 2008 and scored twice during the match. Camacho has gone on to become a regular in the Argentina side and following a number of impressive performances for the Argentine national team during the 2012 Rugby Championship which was topped off with Gonzalo scoring for the Pumas, against the New Zealand All Blacks.

Gonzalo was part of Argentine squad for the 2011 Rugby World Cup in New Zealand. His last match was on 25 July 2015 vs. Australia.
