= Scott Higginbotham =

Australian rugby union player

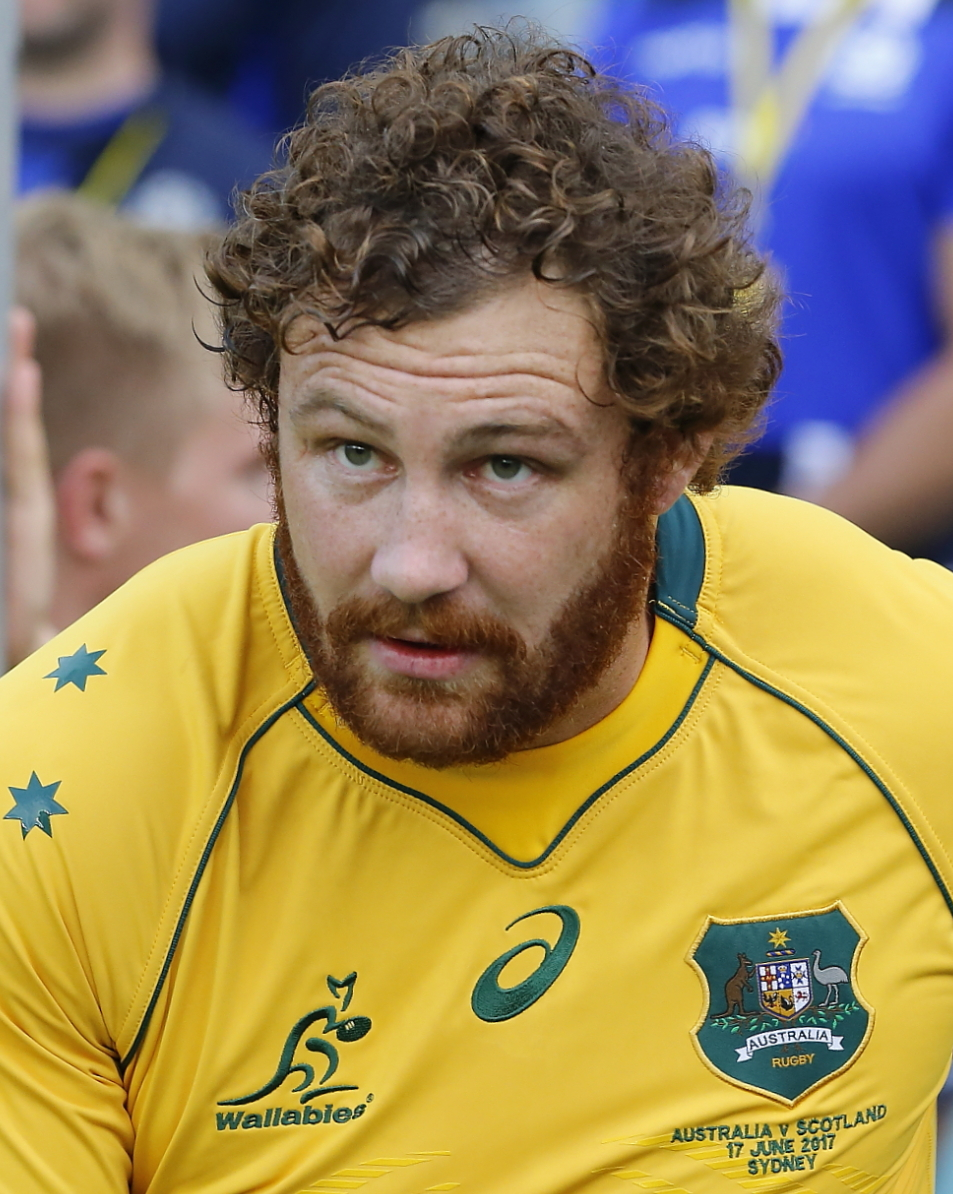
- Higginbotham during the Scotland test, June 2017
- Born: 5 September 1986 (age 40) Perth, Western Australia
- Height: 195 cm (6 ft 5 in)
- Weight: 110 kg (243 lb; 17 st 5 lb)
- School: The Southport School

Rugby union career
- Position(s): Flanker, Number 8
- Current team: Ricoh Black Rams, Reds
Senior career
Years	Team	Apps	(Points)
2007	Ballymore Tornadoes	3	(15)
2008–12, 2017–19	Reds	100	(130)
2013–2015	Rebels	45	(75)
2015	Brisbane City	6	(15)
2015–19	NEC Green Rockets	28	(55)
2019–2021	Union Bordeaux Begles	44	(50)
- Correct as of 14 April 2021
International career
Years	Team	Apps	(Points)
2010–2017	Australia	34	(40)
- Correct as of 17 June 2017
National sevens team
Years	Team		Comps
2007–2008	Australia		
Medal record
Men's rugby union
Representing Australia
Rugby World Cup
Bronze medal – third place	2011 New Zealand	Squad

Scott Higginbotham (born 5 September 1986) is a retired Australian rugby union player. Capped 32 times for Australia's national team, the Wallabies, Higginbotham's usual positions are blindside flanker and number eight.

Higginbotham held the record for highest try-scoring forward in Super Rugby history until June 2023.

== Early life ==
Higginbotham was educated at The Southport School, on the Gold Coast, Queensland. His mother was born in Fiji and is part-Fijian, which made him eligible to play internationally for Fiji, something which Higginbotham contemplated before being accepted into the Wallabies.

== Career ==
In 2007–2008, Higginbotham played international rugby sevens for the Australian national rugby sevens team.

In 2007, Higginbotham was the Queensland Reds Academy Player of the Year, and made his Super 14 debut with the Reds the following year against the Bulls. Higginbotham was an integral member of the Reds team that won the Super Rugby championship in 2011.

In August 2010, Higginbotham was named as a reserve for Australia to play against South Africa in Pretoria. Higginbotham made his international test debut for the Wallabies against France on 27 November 2010 at the State de France.

In 2013, Higginbotham commenced a two-year contract for the Melbourne Rebels. Higginbotham was expected to bring size and versatility to the Rebels loose-forwards. Rebels coach Damien Hill said that "[In Higginbotham] you've got one of the best ball-running, lineout jumping options in Australian rugby." Hill praised Higginbotham for his "aggression and intent at contact". Throughout 2013, Higginbotham acted as fill-in captain for the injured Rebels' skipper Gareth Delve, and in 2014 Higginbotham was officially announced as the captain for the Rebels, a position he held for the remainder of his tenure with the club. In his final Super Rugby campaign at the Rebels, Higginbotham surpassed Owen Finegan as the leading try-scoring forward in Super Rugby history, and was awarded the 2015 Growden Medal Award for being the most consistent player among the Australian provinces.

In 2015, Higginbotham left the Melbourne Rebels after signing a two-year contract with the NEC Green Rockets, based in Abiko, Chiba, Japan.

Higginbotham signed a three-year contract in 2016 to return to the Queensland Reds for the 2017 Super Rugby season. On 1 February 2018 Scott Higginbotham was named captain of the Queensland-based side. On 1 June 2019 Scott Higginbotham made his 100th appearance for the Queensland based side.

On 17 February 2019, Higginbotham left Australia to join French side Bordeaux in the Top 14 competition ahead of the 2019–20 season.

Higginbotham retired in September 2021.

== Super Rugby statistics ==
As of 15 June 2015

Season	Team	Games	Starts	Sub	Mins	Tries	Cons	Pens	Drops	Points	Yel	Red
2008	Reds	5	1	4	115	0	0	0	0	0	0	0
2009	Reds	12	6	6	634	2	0	0	0	10	1	0
2010	Reds	13	13	0	991	4	0	0	0	20	0	0
2011	Reds	18	17	1	1348	6	0	0	0	30	0	0
2012	Reds	16	16	0	1240	5	0	0	0	25	0	0
2013	Rebels	14	14	0	1079	6	0	0	0	30	1	0
2014	Rebels	15	15	0	1200	4	0	0	0	20	3	0
2015	Rebels	16	16	0	1203	5	0	0	0	25	1	0
Total		109	98	11	7810	32	0	0	0	160	6	0
