= Radike Samo =

Australia international rugby union player

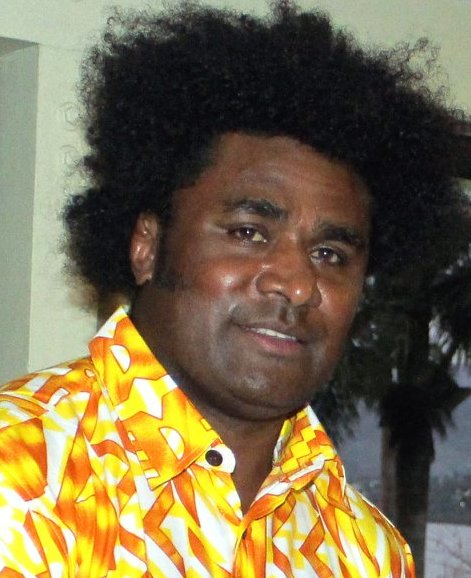
- Samo in 2018
- Born: 9 July 1976 (age 50) Nadi, Fiji
- Height: 1.97 m (6 ft 5 1/2 in)
- Weight: 117 kg (258 lb)
- Notable relative: Ravuama Samo (brother)

Rugby union career
- Position(s): Number Eight, Flanker, Lock, Wing,
Senior career
Years	Team	Apps	(Points)
2006–07	Stade Français	22	(30)
2007–10	Y. M Atlastars		
2013–15	Kintetsu Liners	27	(50)
2015	Queensland Country	2	(5)
2017	Brisbane City	1	
- Correct as of 4 November 2015
Super Rugby
Years	Team	Apps	(Points)
2000–06	Brumbies	35	(20)
2010–13	Reds	33	(25)
2015	Rebels	1	(0)
- Correct as of 14 June 2015
International career
Years	Team	Apps	(Points)
2004, 2011–12	Australia	23	(15)
- Correct as of 11 November 2012
Medal record
Men's rugby union
Representing Australia
Rugby World Cup
Bronze medal – third place	2011 New Zealand	Squad

Radike Samo (born 9 July 1976) is an Australian retired rugby union player. He plays lock, flanker, number 8 and can even play on the wing.

== Rugby career ==
Between 2000 and 2006, Samo played 35 games for the ACT Brumbies.

He played with the Fiji Under-19's national team before winning 6 caps for the Wallabies in 2004.

In the summer of 2006, he signed a two-year contract with French giants Stade Français after rejecting an offer from Cardiff Blues. He scored a try on his debut with the Paris team after just 6 minutes (v ASM Clermont Auvergne, 30 August 2006, 45-15) and the winning try in the French Championship final against the same team in Stade de France on 9 June 2007, after scoring against Biarritz Olympique in the semi-final, both times coming off the bench.

In April 2010, he returned from Japan to play for the Southern Districts Rebels in the Shute Shield competition, before joining the Queensland Reds on a short-term contract as cover for James Horwill. He started off slowly but after several games he was dubbed "outstanding" by Reds coach Ewen Mckenzie. He continued with the Reds in 2011, playing in the team's Super Rugby final triumph on his 35th birthday. The following day it was announced he had been called up to the Wallabies 40-man squad for the Test against Samoa, and TriNations series against New Zealand and South Africa.

He scored his first test try for the Wallabies during the final Tri-Nations and Bledisloe Cup match against the All Blacks in Brisbane on 27 August 2011. This try was later selected as the IRPA Try of the Year 2011.

At 35 years old, Samo is the oldest player to play for Australia in a Tri-Nations match. He, unusually, played on the wing for the Wallabies 2011 Rugby World Cup match with Russia, in place of the injured Drew Mitchell.

It was announced on 16 January 2015 that he had signed with the Melbourne Rebels. In 2015, he played for Melbourne Rebels in Super Rugby and Queensland Country in National Rugby Championship. In 2016, he played in the Queensland Premier Rugby competition.

In 2017, he played for Brisbane City in National Rugby Championship.

== Representative record ==
- Super 12/14 debut: 2000 v Reds, Canberra
- Test debut: 2004 v Scotland, Melbourne

== Achievements ==
- Won 2001 & 2004 Super 12 Championship with ACT Brumbies
- Test Rugby Debut: 2004 v Scotland
- 2007 French Top 14 Champion with Stade Français
- Won 2011 Super 15 Championship with Queensland Reds
- Recalled into 2011 Wallabies 40-man Tri-nations and Bledisloe Cup squad after a 7-year absence
- Member of Wallabies 2011 Rugby World Cup squad
- Won 3rd place with the Wallabies in the 2011 World Cup.
- IRB try of the year award 2011
- Recalled into the Wallabies 30-man squad for the 2012 Bledisloe Cup and inaugural rugby championship.
