= Julio Farías Cabello =

Argentine rugby union player (born 1978)

- Born: Julio Alfredo Farías Cabello; 19 September 1978 (age 48) San Miguel de Tucumán, Tucumán, Argentina
- Height: 1.94 m (6 ft 4 1/2 in)
- Weight: 110 kg (17 st 5 lb; 243 lb)

Rugby union career
- Position(s): Lock, Flanker
Senior career
Years	Team	Apps	(Points)
2006–09	Rouen	49	(32)
2009–12	Tucumán		
2011–12	Pampas XV	18	(10)
2012–13	London Welsh	8	(0)
2013	Tucumán		
- Correct as of 15 August 2013
International career
Years	Team	Apps	(Points)
1998–99	Argentina U21	8	(0)
2010–12	Argentina Jaguars	5	(5)
2010–13	Argentina	30	(10)
- Correct as of 24 November 2013

Julio Farías Cabello (born 19 September 1978 in Argentina) is an Argentine rugby union player. He plays as a lock or flanker. He made his debut against France, coming on as a replacement. He was then selected to start the game against Ireland the next week.

== See also ==
- Argentina Rugby Union
