= Martín Rodríguez (rugby union) =

Argentine rugby union player

Martín Rodríguez Gurruchaga
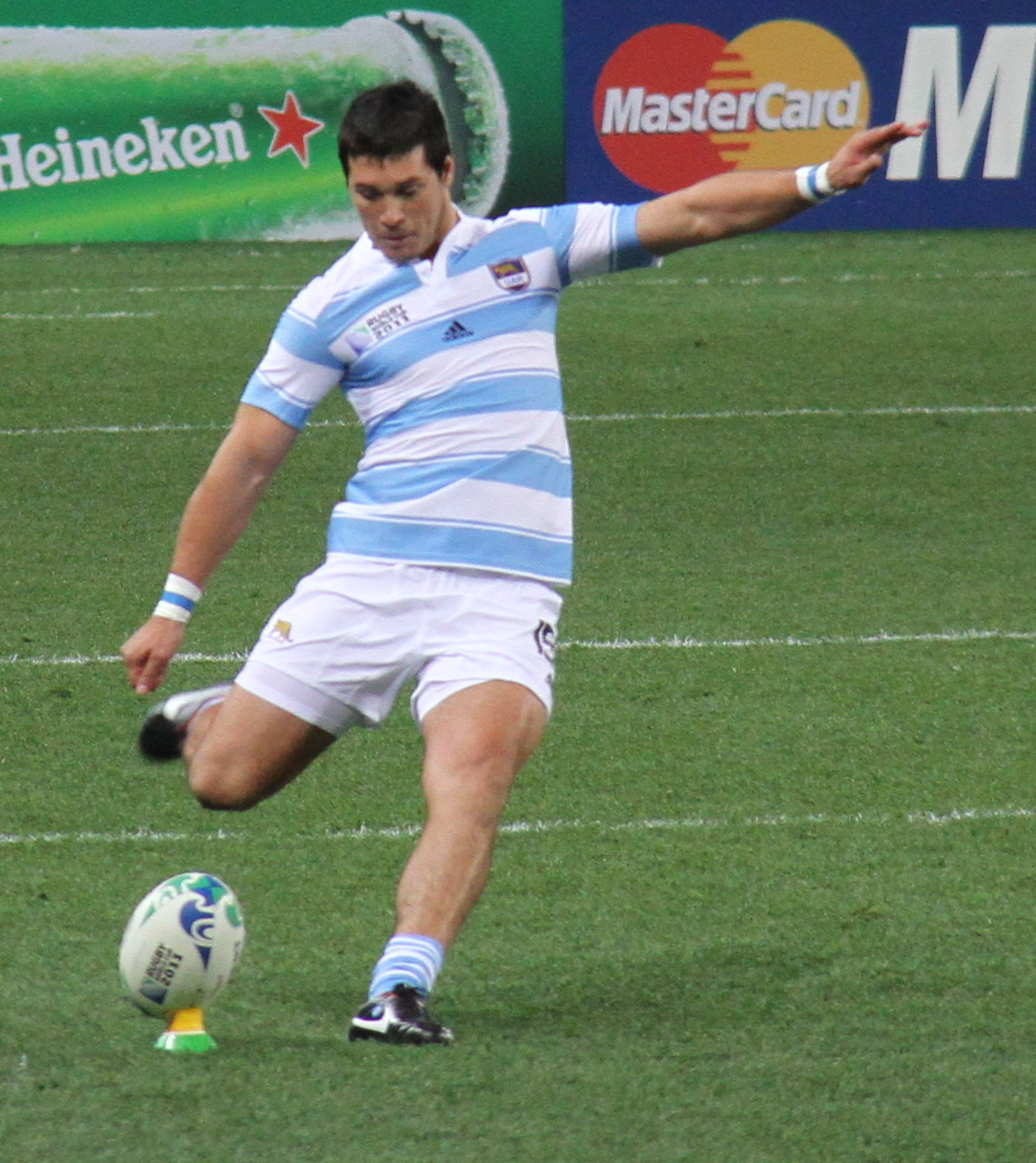
- Argentina vs England at 2011 Rugby World Cup
- Born: Martín Rodríguez Gurruchaga; 4 December 1985 (age 40) Rosario, Argentina
- Height: 6 ft 1 in (1.85 m)
- Weight: 91 kg (14 st 5 lb)

Rugby union career
- Position: Fullback/Centre
Senior career
Years	Team	Apps	(Points)
2010	Pampas XV	7	(65)
2010–	Stade Français	52	(99)
- Correct as of 21 June 2013
International career
Years	Team	Apps	(Points)
2009–	Argentina	19	(72)
- Correct as of 30 September 2012
National sevens team
Years	Team		Comps
- Argentina 7s

Martín Rodríguez Gurruchaga (born 4 December 1985 in Rosario) is an Argentine rugby union footballer, currently with the Paris Top 14 club Stade Français. He plays in both the fullback and centre positions. His test debut for Argentina was against England at Twickenham in November 2009. In May 2010 Rodríguez was selected in a squad of over 40 players to represent Argentina in the two test Summer tour of Argentina.
