= Marcelo Bosch =

Argentine rugby union footballer

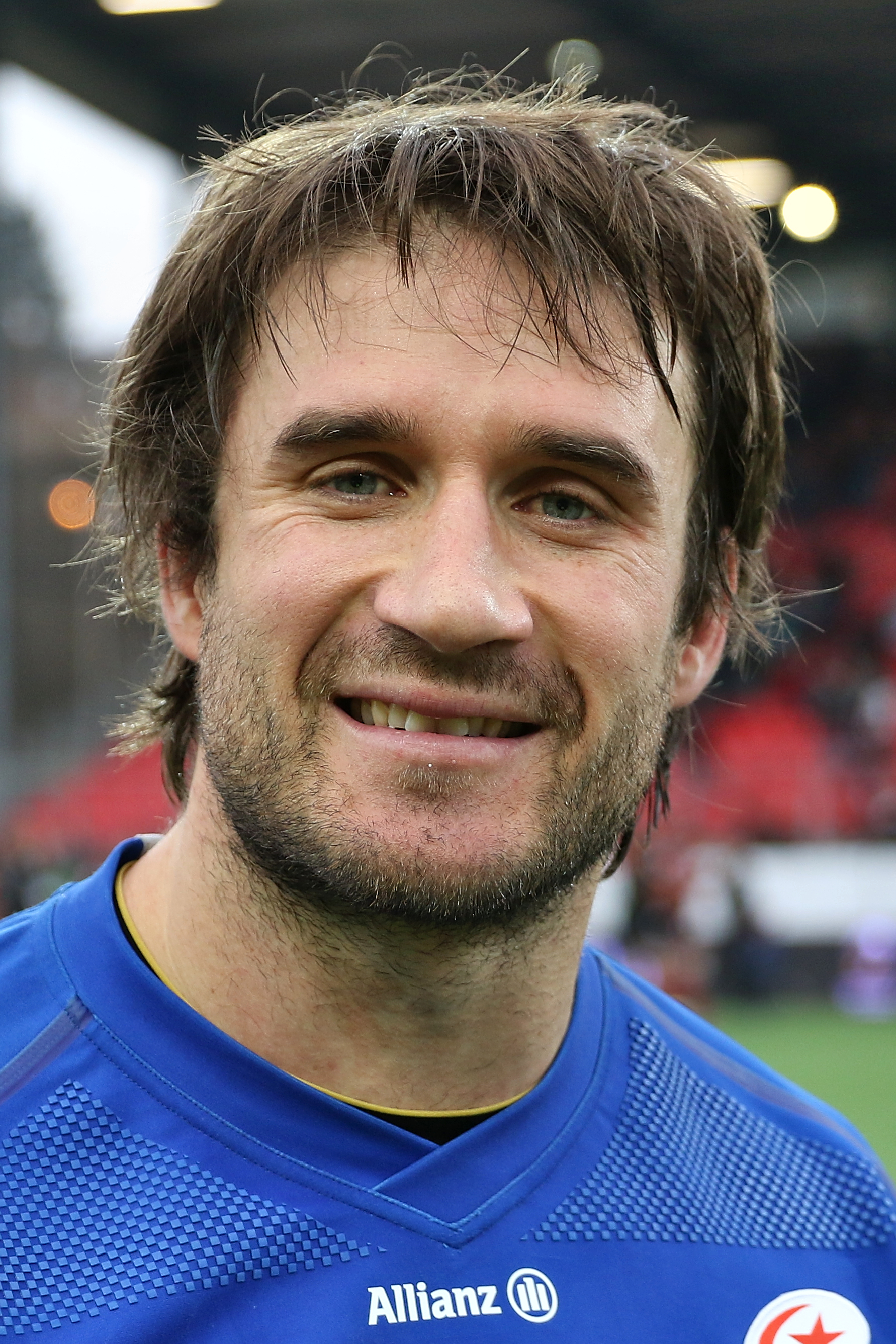
- Full name: Marcelo Tristán Bosch
- Born: 7 January 1984 (age 42) Buenos Aires, Argentina
- Height: 1.86 m (6 ft 1 in)
- Weight: 97 kg (15 st 4 lb; 214 lb)
- Occupation: Rugby Player

Rugby union career
- Position: Centre/Full Back/Fly Half
- Current team: Saracens
Amateur team(s)
Years	Team	Apps	(Points)
- Belgrano Athletic Club
Senior career
Years	Team	Apps	(Points)
2006–2013	Biarritz	119	(168)
2013–2019	Saracens	96	(79)
- Correct as of 6 May 2017
International career
Years	Team	Apps	(Points)
2005	Argentina U21	7	(36)
2006	Pumas Sevens	4	
2006	Argentina A	3	(0)
2007–2015	Argentina	39	(60)
- Correct as of 25 October 2015

Marcelo Bosch (born January 7, 1984) is a former Argentine rugby union footballer. He most recently played for Saracens F.C. in the Aviva Premiership. He used to play for the Argentina national team, Los Pumas. His usual position was centre, but he could also play at fly half or full-back.

He participated at the 2011 Rugby World Cup in New Zealand and 2015 Rugby World Cup in England.

Bosch is part of the national squad that competes in the Rugby Championship.

Marcelo Bosch retired from rugby at the end of the 2018/2019 season, his last club being Saracens RFC. During his time at Saracens he has won two Premiership titles in 2016 and 2018. He also helped Saracens win the European Champions Cup in 2016 and 2017.

At the start of the season 2019/2020 season Bosch was a part time player/coach for a level 5 team, Burton RFC in Staffordshire.
