= Manuel Carizza =

Argentine rugby union footballer

Manuel Nicolás Carizza
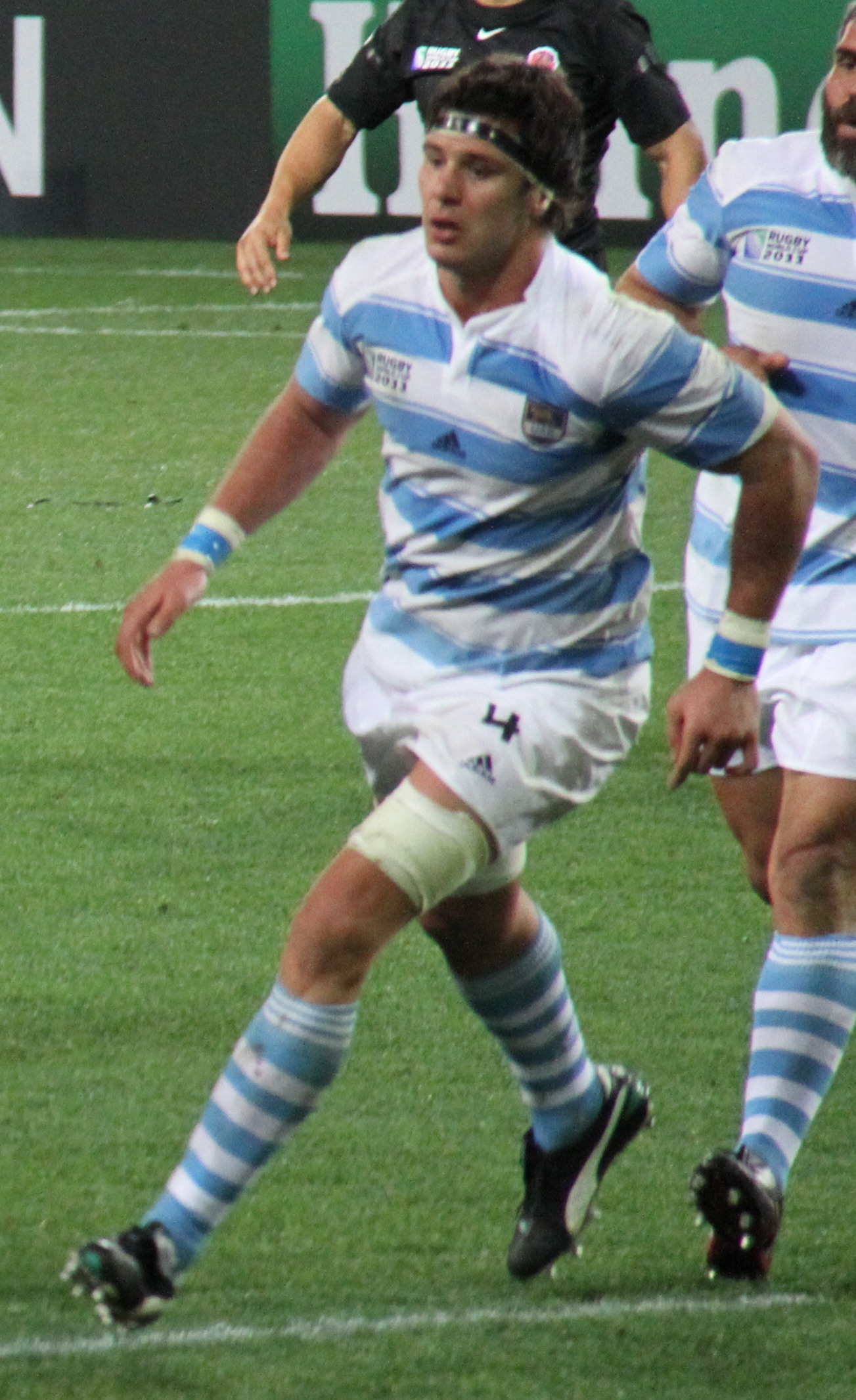
- Full name: Manuel Nicolás Carizza
- Born: 23 August 1984 (age 42) Rosario, Argentina
- Height: 2.02 m (6 ft 7 1/2 in)
- Weight: 118 kg (18 st 8 lb; 260 lb)

Rugby union career
- Position: Lock
- Current team: Racing 92
Amateur team(s)
Years	Team	Apps	(Points)
1989–2005	Jockey Club de Rosario		
Senior career
Years	Team	Apps	(Points)
2005–12	Biarritz	113	(25)
2012–13	Racing Métro	11	(5)
2014–15	Stormers	17	(0)
2014	Western Province	11	(0)
2015–18	Racing 92	71	(15)
2018-19	Lyon OU	7	(0)
- Correct as of 20 December 2019
International career
Years	Team	Apps	(Points)
2002–03	Argentina Under-19		
2004–05	Argentina Under-21		
2004–05	Argentina 'A'	1	(0)
2004–	Argentina	44	(5)
- Correct as of 21 June 2015

Manuel Nicolás Carizza (born 23 August 1984 in Rosario) is an Argentine rugby union footballer who usually plays as a lock. He currently plays for French Top 14 side Racing 92. He started his career with Argentine club Jockey Club de Rosario until he joined French side Biarritz in 2005. He spent seven years at Biarritz before joining Racing Métro for the 2012–13 season. In 2014, he signed for South African Super Rugby side the Stormers and also played for their affiliated domestic provincial side Western Province, but returned to Racing Métro (since rebranded as Racing 92) for the 2015–16 season.

He made his international debut for Argentina in December 2004 in a match against South Africa, which the Springboks won by 39 points to 7. He next played for the Pumas in April 2005, where he was called up to the starting line-up against Japan. He then played in the November Tests against the Springboks, Scotland and Italy.

He was capped in June 2006 in one of the Tests against Wales during the hosting of a two match series, which Argentina eventually won. He was capped against Chile and Uruguay in July, in the starting line-up for both games.

He signed for South African Super Rugby side the Stormers for the 2014 Super Rugby season.

== Honours ==
(France) Racing 92

- Top 14: 2015–16
