= Agustín Creevy =

Argentine rugby union player

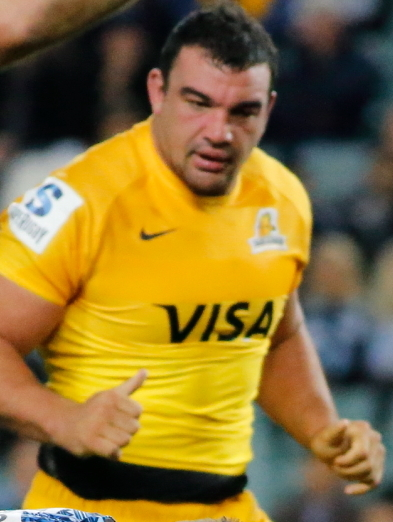
- Creevy with the Jaguares in 2017
- Born: 15 March 1985 (age 41) La Plata, Argentina
- Height: 1.81 m (5 ft 11 in)
- Weight: 106 kg (234 lb; 16 st 10 lb)

Rugby union career
- Position: Hooker
Senior career
Years	Team	Apps	(Points)
2007–2009	Biarritz	8	(0)
2010–2011	Pampas XV	13	(10)
2010	San Luis	9	(35)
2010	Clermont	1	(0)
2011–2013	Montpellier	43	(15)
2013–2015	Worcester Warriors	29	(20)
2016–2020	Jaguares	59	(80)
2020–2023	London Irish	68	(140)
2023–2024	Sale Sharks	14	(25)
2024–2025	Benetton	7	(10)
- Correct as of 4 November 2023
International career
Years	Team	Apps	(Points)
2004	Argentina U21	3	(10)
2005–2024	Argentina	110	(30)
- Correct as of 1 September 2024

Agustín Creevy (born 15 March 1985) is an Argentine professional rugby union player who plays as a hooker for Benetton Rugby. He previously also played for the Argentina national team.

== Club career ==
Agustín started his rugby career in the San Luis rugby club, in La Plata, Buenos Aires. He made his Argentina debut aged 20 against Japan in 2005, playing as a flanker, two years later, he signed his first professional contract with French Top 14 side Biarritz in 2007. However, he played very little in his first season in Biarritz and had gone out of international selection contention soon after his debut for Argentina.

In his second season at Biarritz, he played just 20 minutes and suffered a lot from a shoulder injury. During his time injured Argentina coach Santiago Phelan suggested he switched position from flanker to hooker, Creevy requested and was granted an early release from his contract with Biarritz in January 2009 to return to Argentina to adapt to playing his new position.

After cementing his status as Argentina's number 2 hooker throughout 2010, Creevy was signed by Clermont as a medical joker for the injured Willie Wepener in October 2010 on recommendation from Mario Ledesma. However he only played 2 minutes during his three-month stay at Clermont, and returned to the Pampas XV in 2011. After the Pampas XV's undefeated campaign he was signed by his third Top 14 side Montpellier.

In August 2020, he signed a one-year contract with Premiership Rugby side London Irish, ahead of the 2020–21 season.

In February 2021, Creevy spoke of the idea of renovating his contract with London Irish, staying in England, and playing in the 2023 World Cup. In the same month, he extended his contract with the club and was joined by compatriot Facundo Gigena, who arrived from Leicester Tigers.

In October 2021, Creevy marked tries in four consecutive games and grew his desire of returning to the Pumas. The tries were against rivals Sale Sharks, Northampton Saints, Leicester Tigers and Gloucester. Creevy, at age 36, also started in the last five games and disputed 286 minutes. On 7 January 2022, Creevy renewed his contract with London Irish.

After the suspension of London Irish from the Premiership, Creevy joined rival Premiership side Sale Sharks ahead of the 2023/24 season, spending one year with the Sharks.

On the 2nd of October 2024, Creevy joined Italian side Benetton Rugby. He made his debut in Round 7 of the 2024–25 season against the Edinburgh Rugby. He played with Benetton in the United Rugby Championship until 2025.

== International career ==
Remarkably, within months Creevy was selected to play for the Argentina Jaguars a few months later in May 2009 to tour Namibia, and was retained for the 2009 Churchill Cup. He was then selected for the senior Argentina side for the 2009 November tests and replaced Alberto Vernet Basualdo as the Pumas understudy to Mario Ledesma, all in less than a year of playing hooker.

In 2011, Creevy was captain the Pumas under coach Santiago Phelan, for Argentina's second warm up match against the French Barbarians however it didn't go well for him as Argentina struggled massively at the lineout and lost 21–18. He also captained the Pumas against Worcester. Creevy was selected by Argentina for the 2011 Rugby World Cup and played in all matches off the bench.

Creevy is known as a mobile hooker with good ball handling skills for a hooker. His good offloading skills have led him to become called "Sonny Bill" Creevy (after the All Blacks centre Sonny Bill Williams whose trademark is offloading) by some Montpellier fans.

Agustín is part of the Argentina squad that competes in the Rugby Championship, being captain since the 2014 Rugby Championship and until the 2018 Rugby Championship.

He was part of the national team that competed at the 2015 Rugby World Cup and 2019 Rugby World Cup.

In 2016, Creevy received an offer from a club in Ireland before returning to Argentina to play for Jaguares. He returned Argentina with the intention of playing for the Pumas.

He played his final match for Argentina before retiring against Australia in August 2024.

Agustin is the Argentine rugby player with the most caps for the Pumas with 110.

== Personal life ==
Creevy was born in La Plata.

In November 2020, Creevy tributed the passing of Diego Maradona in an interview and also with his team, London Irish, in a game against Leicester where Creevy used a black jersey with the number 10 and name Maradona inscribed on it.

Creevy is ambassador for Assist Card.
