= Willem Alberts =

South Africa international rugby union player

- Full name: Willem Schalk Alberts
- Born: 11 May 1984 (age 42) Pretoria, South Africa
- Height: 1.92 m (6 ft 3 1/2 in)
- Weight: 120 kg (18 st 13 lb; 265 lb)
- School: Hoërskool Monument, Krugersdorp
- University: University of Johannesburg

Rugby union career
- Position: Flanker / Lock
- Current team: Lions / Golden Lions
Youth career
- 2004–2005: Golden Lions
Senior career
| Years | Team | Apps | (Points) |
| 2005–2008 | Golden Lions XV | 5 | (5) |
| 2005–2009 | Golden Lions | 32 | (35) |
| 2007–2009 | Lions | 37 | (20) |
| 2010–2015 | Sharks | 73 | (40) |
| 2010–2013 | Sharks | 19 | (20) |
| 2013 | Sharks XV | 2 | (10) |
| 2015–2020 | Stade Français | 79 | (15) |
| 2020–2024 | Lions | 41 | (2) |
| 2020–2024 | Golden Lions | 8 | (10) |
- Correct as of 3 June 2024
International career
| Years | Team | Apps | (Points) |
| 2010 | South Africa (tour) | 1 | (0) |
| 2010–2016 | South Africa (tests) | 43 | (35) |
| 2014 | Springbok XV | 1 | (0) |
- Correct as of 19 November 2016
Medal record
Men's Rugby union
Representing South Africa
Rugby World Cup
| Bronze medal – third place | 2015 England | Squad |

Willem Schalk Alberts (born 11 May 1984) is a South African former professional rugby union player who played for Lions in the Vodacom United Rugby Championship competition. He previously played for the Lions and the Sharks in Super Rugby and for the Golden Lions and Sharks in the Currie Cup before joining Stade Français. At the end of January 2020, Alberts confirmed his move back to his roots to rejoin the Lions, in order to help them with their Super Rugby campaign. He was schooled at Hoërskool Monument in Krugersdorp.

== Career ==
Alberts made his professional debut for the Golden Lions in 2007. In that same year he was awarded his debut in the Super 14, playing against the Waratahs. He moved to the Sharks in 2010. In October 2010, Willem was selected to the Springboks squad of 39 players to prepare for the November tour of Europe.

He is known for his punishing runs (often requiring more than one tackler to stop him) and his rock solid defence. Due to his colossal mass (120 kg) Alberts' bruising runs and bone-crunching tackling, that often constitute "big hits", have made him a crowd favorite and earned him a large following.

During the 2010 Currie Cup semi-final against the Vodacom Blue Bulls Alberts was awarded "Man-of-the-Match" after he put in a solid performance consisting of 21 ball carries gaining 144 metres. It is after a string of monumental performances for the Sharks that Alberts was named as part of the Springbok squad ahead of the 2010 Northern Hemisphere grand slam tour.

Alberts made his debut for South Africa off the bench on 13 November 2010 and scored a try against Wales. Many believe that Alberts' impact was so great off the bench that he alone swung the game in the Boks favor and pulled them through.

He won his second Springbok cap against Scotland, when he once again came on off the bench and scored a powerful try after plucking the ball from the air in a line out and driving over the whitewash. However, his exploits were not enough and the Boks lost the game.

His third cap came the following weekend against England at Twickenham. Alberts would come onto the field once more in the number 19 jersey and would score another try, this time in the corner which buried the English side and Alberts was branded "Super Sub".

Willem Alberts made his run on debut against the Barbarians at Twickenham in the unfamiliar open side flanker berth. Although he did not score a try the test did not count as an official cap and Alberts returned to South Africa with a 100% try scoring record on his debut tour.

== 2011 season ==
Alberts played in all eighteen of the Sharks matches in the 2011 Super Rugby season. He won his first "Man-of-the-Match" award in the Super Rugby competition for the Sharks for his performance against the Cheetahs. He also scored his first Super Rugby try for the Sharks against the Western Force in a bonus point win for the Sharks. He went on to score another try against the Crusaders in a historic match held at Twickenham. He won another man of the match award against the Lions, making an impressive 18 ball carries. Alberts is the Sharks' leading tackler in their 2011 Super Rugby campaign with an average of 10 tackles per match and is the third highest in the entire tournament with 58. Against the Hurricanes he made an imperious 23 tackles, and in such form has made him a big name in South African rugby.

Alberts made his starting capped debut for the Springboks against the All Blacks in Port Elizabeth on 10 August 2011 in the number 7 jersey. Alberts showed his grunt with 13 tackles and bruised his way into Peter de Villiers' World Cup plans.

== 2012 season ==
Alberts started against England which South Africa won 22–17. He also scored a try in the second test which South Africa won 36–27. The Springboks wrapped up the series in that win. He was injured and out for the final test which South Africa held to a 14–14 draw against England. Potgieter replaced Alberts at blindside flanker. Alberts has a good future after South Africa won the series against England in which Alberts was a big performer.

== Early life ==
Alberts was one of the seven-year-old children selected in 1992 to appear in 7 Up in South Africa, the South African version of the Up series. He has appeared in the documentary every 7 years since then, and has covered aspects of his life including his early life on a farm, the death of his father in a car accident and his family's subsequent move to the city.
