= Juan Figallo =

Argentine rugby union player

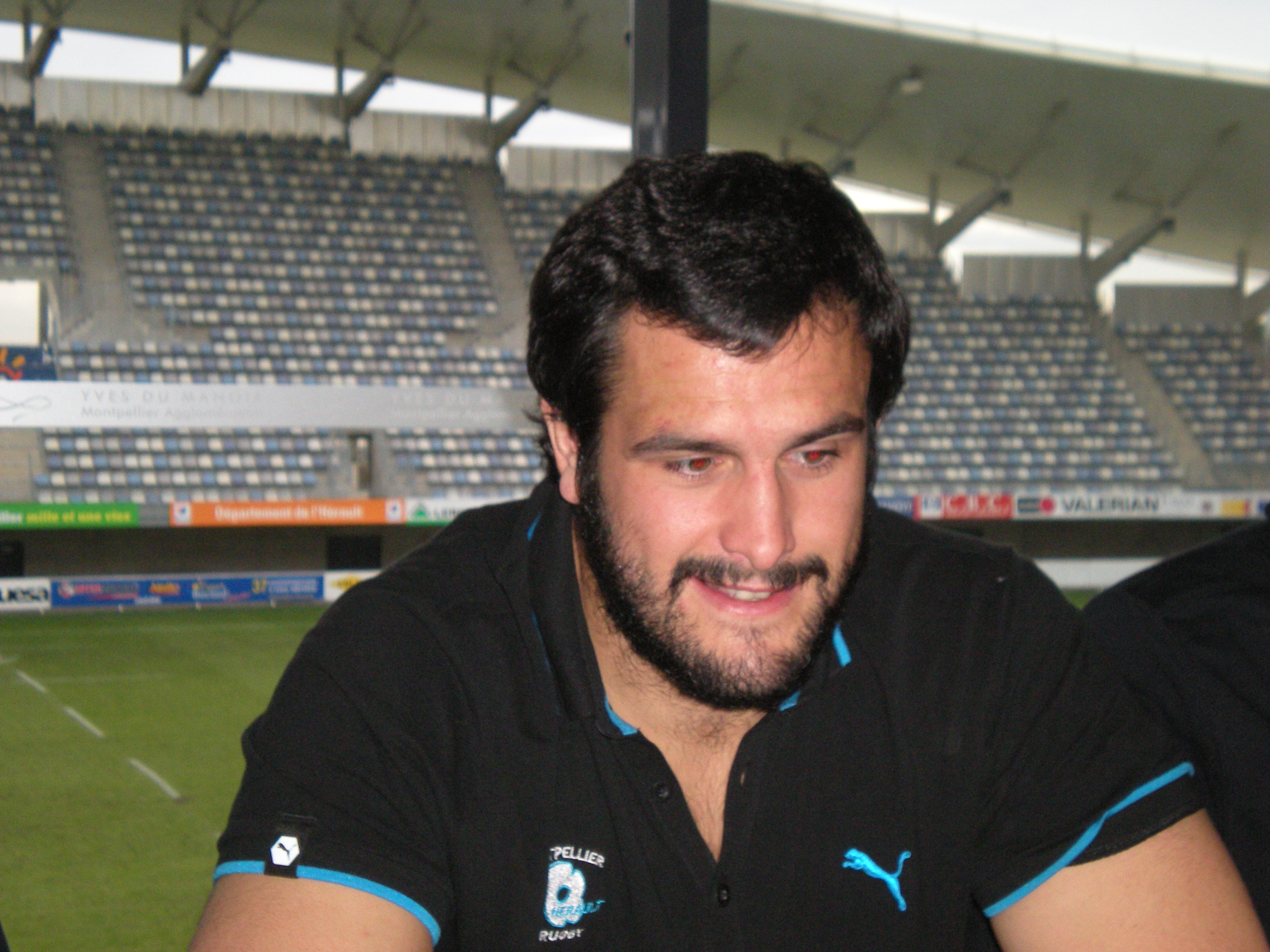
- Born: Juan Guillermo Figallo; March 25, 1988 (age 38) Salta, Argentina
- Height: 1.87 m (6 ft 2 in)
- Weight: 119 kg (18 st 10 lb)

Rugby union career
- Position: Tighthead Prop
Amateur team(s)
Years	Team	Apps	(Points)
- Jockey Club de Salta
Senior career
Years	Team	Apps	(Points)
2009–2014	Montpellier	65	(25)
2014-2020	Saracens	96	(35)
- Correct as of 12 November 2020
International career
Years	Team	Apps	(Points)
2006–07	Argentina U19		
2008	Argentina U20		
2009–10	Argentina Jaguars	5	(0)
2010–2019	Argentina	33	(5)
- Correct as of 18 September 2019

Juan Guillermo Figallo (born in Salta, March 25, 1988) is an Argentine former rugby union player. He began playing at Jockey Club de Salta and then was recruited by the French side Montpellier in the Top 14. Figallo was called for the 2011 Rugby World Cup, being named "Player of Pool B" and the best tight-head prop at the competition. On 24 May 2014, Figallo signed for English club Saracens for the 2014/15 season. During his time at Saracens he has won three Premiership titles in 2015, 2016 and 2018. He also helped Saracens win the European Champions Cup in 2016.

With the Argentina National team, he has also played the Rugby Championship in 2012, 2013, 2018 and 2019 and was part of the squad for the 2011 Rugby World Cup in New Zealand, 2015 Rugby World Cup in England and 2019 Rugby World Cup in Japan. Figallo was not initially named in the squad in 2015 but was then called up to replace the injured Nahuel Tetaz Chaparro after the tournament started.

He announced his retirement in November 2020, having been unable to recover from a head injury sustained at the 2019 World Cup.
