= 2013 Rugby Championship =

- Date: 17 August – 5 October 2013
- Countries: Argentina; Australia; New Zealand; South Africa

Final positions
- Champions: New Zealand (12th title)
- Bledisloe Cup: New Zealand
- Freedom Cup: New Zealand
- Mandela Challenge Plate: South Africa
- Puma Trophy: Australia

Tournament statistics
- Matches played: 12
- Tries scored: 66 (5.5 per match)
- Attendance: 488,113 (40,676 per match)
- Top scorer(s): (South Africa) Morné Steyn (88)
- Most tries: (New Zealand) Ben Smith (8)

The 2013 Rugby Championship, known as The Castle Rugby Championship in South Africa, The Investec Rugby Championship in New Zealand, The Castrol Edge Rugby Championship in Australia and The Personal Rugby Championship in Argentina for sponsorship reasons, was the second edition of the expanded annual southern hemisphere championship consisting of Argentina, Australia, South Africa and New Zealand. New Zealand as the 2012 holders, was trying to keep their 100% winning record in the championship after winning six from six in 2012.

The Championship began on 17 August with Australia hosting New Zealand at Stadium Australia and South Africa hosting Argentina at the FNB Stadium. The match between South Africa and Argentina was originally meant to be held at the Free State Stadium, but it was moved to the FNB to form a unique sports programme – Nelson Mandela Sports Day – in honour of Nelson Mandela.

The Championship concluded with South Africa hosting New Zealand at the Ellis Park Stadium and Argentina hosting Australia at the Estadio Gigante de Arroyito. Argentina were the only nation to reuse the same venues from 2012.

The Championship was retained by New Zealand after a 38-27 win against South Africa at Ellis Park on 5 October, keeping their 100 percent winning record in the expanded championship.

== Standings ==
Place	Nation	Games				Points			Try Bonus	Losing Bonus	Table points
Place	Nation	Played	Won	Drawn	Lost	For	Against	Diff	Try Bonus	Losing Bonus	Table points
1	New Zealand	6	6	0	0	202	115	+87	4	0	28
2	South Africa	6	4	0	2	203	117	+86	3	0	19
3	Australia	6	2	0	4	133	170	-37	1	0	9
4	Argentina	6	0	0	6	88	224	-136	0	2	2

== Fixtures ==
=== Round 1 ===
17 August 2013
20:05 AEST (UTC+10)

Australia	29–47	New Zealand (1 BP)
Try: Genia 37' c O'Connor 79' c Con: Lealiifano (2/2) 33', 81'; Pen: Lealiifano (5/5) 7', 12', 22', 27', 46'	Report	Try: B. Smith (3) 2' c, 56' m, 71' c Cruden 28' c McCaw 31' m C. Smith 51' c Con: Cruden (3/5) 4', 29', 52'; Barrett (1/1) 72'; Pen: Cruden (3/3) 19', 40', 65'

Stadium Australia, Sydney
Attendance: 68,765
Referee: Craig Joubert (South Africa)

FB	15	Jesse Mogg	(substituted off) 52'
RW	14	Israel Folau
OC	13	Adam Ashley-Cooper
IC	12	Christian Lealiifano
LW	11	James O'Connor
FH	10	Matt To'omua	(substituted off) 61'
SH	9	Will Genia	(substituted off) 77'
N8	8	Ben Mowen			(substituted off) 77'
OF	7	Michael Hooper	61' to 65'
BF	6	Hugh McMeniman	(substituted off) 52'
RL	5	James Horwill (c)
LL	4	Rob Simmons
TP	3	Ben Alexander	(substituted off) 57'
HK	2	Stephen Moore	(substituted off) 70'
LP	1	James Slipper	(substituted off) 70'
Replacements:
HK	16	Saia Fainga'a	(substituted on) 70'
PR	17	Scott Sio	(substituted on) 70'
PR	18	Sekope Kepu	(substituted on) 57'
LK	19	Scott Fardy	(substituted on) 61'	(substituted off) 65'	(substituted on) 77'
FL	20	Liam Gill	(substituted on) 52'
SH	21	Nic White	(substituted on) 77'
FH	22	Quade Cooper	(substituted on) 61'
CE	23	Tevita Kuridrani	(substituted on) 52'
Coach:
(Australia) Ewen McKenzie

FB	15	Israel Dagg
RW	14	Ben Smith
OC	13	Conrad Smith
IC	12	Ma'a Nonu		(substituted off) 62'
LW	11	Julian Savea
FH	10	Aaron Cruden		(substituted off) 70'
SH	9	Aaron Smith		(substituted off) 68'
N8	8	Kieran Read
OF	7	Richie McCaw (c)		(substituted off) 72'
BF	6	Steve Luatua
RL	5	Sam Whitelock	(yellow card) 79' to 80'
LL	4	Luke Romano		(substituted off) 17'
TP	3	Owen Franks		(substituted off) 61'
HK	2	Andrew Hore		(substituted off) 48'
LP	1	Tony Woodcock		(substituted off) 61'
Replacements:
HK	16	Keven Mealamu		(substituted on) 48'
PR	17	Ben Franks		(substituted on) 61'
PR	18	Charlie Faumuina		(substituted on) 61'
LK	19	Brodie Retallick		(substituted on) 17'
FL	20	Sam Cane		(substituted on) 72'
SH	21	Tawera Kerr-Barlow		(substituted on) 68'
FH	22	Beauden Barrett		(substituted on) 70'
CE	23	Ryan Crotty		(substituted on) 62'
Coach:
(New Zealand) Steve Hansen

Man of the Match:
Ben Smith (New Zealand)

Touch judges:
Jaco Peyper (South Africa)
Lourens van der Merwe (South Africa)
Television match official:
Shaun Veldsman (South Africa)

Notes:

- Matt To'omua, Scott Sio, Scott Fardy, Tevita Kuridrani and Nic White made their debuts for Australia, with To'omua being the first Wallaby to make his debut against New Zealand in the starting XV since Rod Kafer in 1999.
- Ryan Crotty made his debut for New Zealand.
- New Zealand recorded a 100 test victories against Australia, making them the first ever team to record a century of victories over a single nation.
- With McCaw's try, he becomes the first New Zealand forward to score 100 test points.

17 August 2013
17:00 SAST (UTC+02)

(1 BP) South Africa	73–13	Argentina
Try: Penalty try 29' c Engelbrecht 32' c Strauss 45' c Alberts 52' m De Villiers 55' c Du Preez 62' c Habana 65' c Vermeulen 69' c B. du Plessis 75' c Con: Steyn (8/9) 30', 33', 47', 55', 63', 67', 70', 76'; Pen: Steyn (4/4) 5', 9', 18', 37'	Report	Try: Contepomi 79' c Con: Contepomi (1/1) 80'; Pen: Contepomi (2/2) 16', 22'

FNB Stadium, Johannesburg
Attendance: 52,867
Referee: Chris Pollock (New Zealand)

FB	15	Willie le Roux	(substituted off) 58'
RW	14	Bjorn Basson
OC	13	JJ Engelbrecht
IC	12	Jean de Villiers (c)	(substituted off) 67'
LW	11	Bryan Habana
FH	10	Morné Steyn
SH	9	Ruan Pienaar	(substituted off) 54'
N8	8	Duane Vermeulen
OF	7	Willem Alberts	(substituted off) 64'
BF	6	Francois Louw
RL	5	Juandré Kruger	(substituted off) 57'
LL	4	Eben Etzebeth
TP	3	Jannie du Plessis	(substituted off) 54'
HK	2	Adriaan Strauss	(substituted off) 54'
LP	1	Tendai Mtawarira	(substituted off) 57'
Replacements:
HK	16	Bismarck du Plessis	(substituted on) 54'
PR	17	Gurthrö Steenkamp	(substituted on) 57'
PR	18	Coenie Oosthuizen	(substituted on) 54'
LK	19	Flip van der Merwe	(substituted on) 57'
FL	20	Siya Kolisi	(substituted on) 64'
SH	21	Fourie du Preez	(substituted on) 54'
FH	22	Pat Lambie	(substituted on) 58'
CE	23	Jan Serfontein	(substituted on) 67'
Coach:
(South Africa) Heyneke Meyer

FB	15	Juan Martín Hernández		(substituted off) 30'
RW	14	Gonzalo Camacho
OC	13	Marcelo Bosch
IC	12	Felipe Contepomi (c)
LW	11	Juan Imhoff		(substituted off) 34'	(substituted on) 40'
FH	10	Nicolás Sánchez
SH	9	Martín Landajo		(substituted off) 58'
N8	8	Leonardo Senatore	(yellow card) 50' to 60'
OF	7	Juan Manuel Leguizamón
BF	6	Pablo Matera
RL	5	Patricio Albacete		(substituted off) 13'
LL	4	Manuel Carizza		(substituted off) 59'
TP	3	Matías Díaz		(substituted off) 40'
HK	2	Eusebio Guiñazú	(yellow card) 29' to 39'			(substituted off) 54'
LP	1	Juan Figallo		(substituted off) 60'
Replacements:
HK	16	Agustín Creevy		(substituted on) 34'	(substituted off) 40'	(substituted on) 54'
PR	17	Nahuel Lobo		(substituted on) 40'
PR	18	Juan Pablo Orlandi		(substituted on) 60'
LK	19	Mariano Galarza		(substituted on) 59'
FL	20	Julio Farías Cabello		(substituted on) 13'
SH	21	Tomás Cubelli		(substituted on) 58'
CE	22	Santiago Fernández
WG	23	Horacio Agulla		(substituted on) 30'
Coach:
(Argentina) Santiago Phelan

Man of the Match:
Adriaan Strauss (South Africa)

Touch judges:
Pascal Gaüzère (France)
John Lacey (Ireland)
Television match official:
Eric Gauzins (France)

Notes:

- With this win, South Africa records their biggest winning margin over Argentina of 60. It was previously 54 which they held from 2008.
- South Africa records the most points scored by one team in a match in either the Rugby Championship or Tri Nations. It was previously 61 by South Africa in a 61-22 win over Australia in 1997.
- South Africa records the biggest winning margin in either the Rugby Championship or Tri Nations. It was previously held by Australia in 2006 following a 49-0 victory over South Africa

=== Round 2 ===
24 August 2013
19:35 NZST (UTC+12)

New Zealand	27–16	Australia
Try: B. Smith (2) 26' c, 39' m Con: Taylor (1/2) 27'; Pen: Taylor (4/6) 36', 53', 60', 69'; Dagg (1/1) 75'	Report	Try: Folau 71' c Con: Lealiifano (1/1) 72'; Pen: Lealiifano (3/4) 7', 25', 57'

Wellington Regional Stadium, Wellington
Attendance: 35,583
Referee: Jaco Peyper (South Africa)

FB	15	Israel Dagg
RW	14	Ben Smith	73' to 78'
OC	13	Conrad Smith
IC	12	Ma'a Nonu	(substituted off) 76'
LW	11	Julian Savea
FH	10	Tom Taylor		(substituted off) 78'
SH	9	Aaron Smith	(substituted off) 69'
N8	8	Kieran Read
OF	7	Richie McCaw (c)
BF	6	Steve Luatua
RL	5	Sam Whitelock
LL	4	Brodie Retallick
TP	3	Owen Franks	(substituted off) 65'
HK	2	Andrew Hore	(substituted off) 47'
LP	1	Tony Woodcock	(substituted off) 61'
Replacements:
HK	16	Dane Coles	(substituted on) 47'
PR	17	Wyatt Crockett	(substituted on) 61'
PR	18	Charlie Faumuina	(substituted on) 65'
LK	19	Jeremy Thrush
FL	20	Sam Cane
SH	21	Tawera Kerr-Barlow	(substituted on) 69'
FH	22	Colin Slade	(substituted on) 76'
FB	23	Charles Piutau	(substituted on) 73'
Coach:
(New Zealand) Steve Hansen

FB	15	Jesse Mogg
RW	14	Israel Folau
OC	13	Adam Ashley-Cooper	(substituted off) 62'
IC	12	Christian Lealiifano
LW	11	James O'Connor
FH	10	Matt To'omua	(substituted off) 57'
SH	9	Will Genia	(substituted off) 76'
N8	8	Ben Mowen	(substituted off) 64'
OF	7	Michael Hooper
BF	6	Scott Fardy
RL	5	James Horwill (c)
LL	4	Rob Simmons	(substituted off) 71'
TP	3	Ben Alexander	(substituted off) 54'
HK	2	Stephen Moore	(substituted off) 76'
LP	1	James Slipper	(substituted off) 35'
Replacements:
HK	16	Saia Fainga'a	(substituted on) 76'
PR	17	Scott Sio	(substituted on) 35'
PR	18	Sekope Kepu	(substituted on) 54'
LK	19	Kane Douglas	(substituted on) 71'
FL	20	Liam Gill	(substituted on) 64'
SH	21	Nic White	(substituted on) 76'
FH	22	Quade Cooper	(substituted on) 57'
CE	23	Tevita Kuridrani	(substituted on) 62'
Coach:
(Australia) Ewen McKenzie

Man of the Match:
Steve Luatua (New Zealand)

Touch judges:
Craig Joubert (South Africa)
Lourens van der Merwe (South Africa)
Television match official:
Shaun Veldsman (South Africa)

Notes:

- Tom Taylor made his debut for New Zealand.
- Tony Woodcock became the fourth New Zealand player to earn 100 test caps.
- With this win, New Zealand retains the Bledisloe Cup.

24 August 2013
16:10 AST (UTC−03)

(1 BP) Argentina	17–22	South Africa
Try: Leguizamón 1' c Bosch 36' c Con: Contepomi (2/2) 2', 37'; Pen: Contepomi (1/2) 10'	Report	Try: Basson 13' c Con: Steyn (1/1) 14'; Pen: Steyn (5/5) 8', 40', 45', 71', 80'

Estadio Malvinas Argentinas, Mendoza
Attendance: 23,944
Referee: Steve Walsh (Australia)

FB	15	Lucas González Amorosino
RW	14	Gonzalo Camacho
OC	13	Marcelo Bosch
IC	12	Felipe Contepomi (c)	(substituted off) 48'
LW	11	Horacio Agulla
FH	10	Nicolás Sánchez
SH	9	Martín Landajo	(substituted off) 56'
N8	8	Leonardo Senatore	(substituted off) 60'
OF	7	Juan Manuel Leguizamón
BF	6	Pablo Matera
RL	5	Mariano Galarza	(substituted off) 74'
LL	4	Julio Farías Cabello
TP	3	Juan Figallo
HK	2	Eusebio Guiñazú	(substituted off) 66'
LP	1	Marcos Ayerza
Replacements:
HK	16	Agustín Creevy	(substituted on) 66'
PR	17	Nahuel Lobo
PR	18	Matías Díaz
LK	19	Tomás Lavanini	(substituted on) 74'
N8	20	Benjamín Macome	(substituted on) 60'
SH	21	Tomás Cubelli	(substituted on) 56'
CE	22	Santiago Fernández	(substituted on) 48'
CE	23	Joaquín Tuculet
Coach:
(Argentina) Santiago Phelan

FB	15	Willie le Roux
RW	14	Bjorn Basson	(substituted off) 61'
OC	13	JJ Engelbrecht	(substituted off) 68'
IC	12	Jean de Villiers (c)
LW	11	Bryan Habana
FH	10	Morné Steyn
SH	9	Ruan Pienaar
N8	8	Duane Vermeulen
OF	7	Willem Alberts	(substituted off) 68'
BF	6	Francois Louw
RL	5	Juandré Kruger
LL	4	Eben Etzebeth
TP	3	Jannie du Plessis	(substituted off) 68'
HK	2	Adriaan Strauss	(substituted off) 52'
LP	1	Tendai Mtawarira	(substituted off) 58'
Replacements:
HK	16	Bismarck du Plessis	(substituted on) 52'
PR	17	Gurthrö Steenkamp	(substituted on) 58'
PR	18	Coenie Oosthuizen	(substituted on) 68'
LK	19	Flip van der Merwe	(substituted on) 56'
FL	20	Siya Kolisi	(substituted on) 68'
SH	21	Jano Vermaak
FH	22	Pat Lambie	(substituted on) 61'
CE	23	Jan Serfontein	(substituted on) 68'
Coach:
(South Africa) Heyneke Meyer

Man of the Match:
Juan Manuel Leguizamón (Argentina)

Touch judges:
Pascal Gaüzère (France)
John Lacey (Ireland)
Television match official:
Marshall Kilgore (Ireland)

Notes:

- With this win, South Africa record their first away win in The Rugby Championship
- Bismarck du Plessis earned his 50th cap for South Africa.

=== Round 3 ===
7 September 2013
19:35 NZST (UTC+12)

New Zealand	28–13	Argentina
Try: A. Smith (2) 23' c, 26' m Savea 53' c Con: Carter (2/3) 25', 54'; Pen: Carter (2/4) 10', 49'; Barrett (1/1) 74'	Report	Try: Leguizamón 4' c Con: Sánchez (1/1) 5'; Pen: Sánchez (2/3) 30', 52'

Waikato Stadium, Hamilton
Attendance: 25,417
Referee: Jérôme Garcès (France)

FB	15	Israel Dagg	(substituted off) 72'
RW	14	Ben Smith
OC	13	Conrad Smith
IC	12	Francis Saili
LW	11	Julian Savea
FH	10	Dan Carter	(substituted off) 54'
SH	9	Aaron Smith	(substituted off) 75'
N8	8	Kieran Read
OF	7	Richie McCaw (c)	(substituted off) 59'
BF	6	Steve Luatua
RL	5	Sam Whitelock	(substituted off) 75'
LL	4	Brodie Retallick
TP	3	Charlie Faumuina	(substituted off) 70'	(substituted on) 78'
HK	2	Andrew Hore	(substituted off) 46'
LP	1	Tony Woodcock	(substituted off) 40'
Replacements:
HK	16	Dane Coles	(substituted on) 46'
PR	17	Wyatt Crockett	(substituted on) 40'	(substituted off) 78'
PR	18	Ben Franks	(substituted on) 70'
LK	19	Jeremy Thrush	(substituted on) 75'
FL	20	Sam Cane	(substituted on) 59'
SH	21	Tawera Kerr-Barlow	(substituted on) 75'
FH	22	Beauden Barrett	(substituted on) 54'
FB	23	Charles Piutau	(substituted on) 72'
Coach:
(New Zealand) Steve Hansen

FB	15	Juan Martín Hernández
RW	14	Gonzalo Camacho		(substituted off) 45'
OC	13	Marcelo Bosch
IC	12	Santiago Fernández		(substituted off) 70'
LW	11	Horacio Agulla
FH	10	Nicolás Sánchez
SH	9	Martín Landajo		(substituted off) 64'
N8	8	Juan Manuel Leguizamón
OF	7	Pablo Matera		(substituted off) 75'
BF	6	Juan Martín Fernández Lobbe (c)
RL	5	Julio Farías Cabello		(substituted off) 55'
LL	4	Manuel Carizza
TP	3	Juan Figallo		(substituted off) 62'
HK	2	Eusebio Guiñazú	(yellow card) 22' to 32'	(substituted off) 49'
LP	1	Marcos Ayerza		(substituted off) 69'
Replacements:
HK	16	Agustín Creevy		(substituted on) 49'
PR	17	Nahuel Lobo		(substituted on) 69'
PR	18	Juan Pablo Orlandi		(substituted on) 62'
LK	19	Mariano Galarza		(substituted on) 55'
N8	20	Benjamín Macome		(substituted on) 75'
SH	21	Tomás Cubelli		(substituted on) 64'
FH	22	Felipe Contepomi		(substituted on) 70'
FB	23	Lucas González Amorosino		(substituted on) 45'
Coach:
(Argentina) Santiago Phelan

Man of the Match:
Kieran Read (New Zealand)

Touch judges:
Romain Poite (France)
James Leckie (Australia)
Television match official:
George Ayoub (Australia)

Notes:

- During the match, Dan Carter became the first player to pass 1400 international test points.
- Francis Saili made his debut for New Zealand (All Black number 1126).

7 September 2013
20:05 AEST (UTC+10)

Australia	12–38	South Africa (1 BP)
Pen: Lealiifano (4/4) 8', 22', 43', 52'	Report	Try: Oosthuizen 5' c De Villiers 59' m Kirchner 65' c Le Roux 68' c Con: Steyn (3/4) 5', 67', 69'; Pen: Steyn (4/5) 13', 28', 34', 49'

Lang Park, Brisbane
Attendance: 43,715
Referee: George Clancy (Ireland)

FB	15	Israel Folau
RW	14	James O'Connor
OC	13	Adam Ashley-Cooper
IC	12	Christian Lealiifano		(substituted off) 74'
LW	11	Nick Cummins
FH	10	Quade Cooper
SH	9	Will Genia (c)		(substituted off) 69'
N8	8	Ben Mowen		(substituted off) 70'
OF	7	Michael Hooper	(yellow card) 49' to 59'	(substituted off) 69'
BF	6	Scott Fardy
RL	5	Kane Douglas
LL	4	Rob Simmons		30' to 40'
TP	3	Sekope Kepu		(substituted off) 46'
HK	2	Stephen Moore		66' to 69'		(substituted off) 74'
LP	1	James Slipper		(substituted off) 64'
Replacements:
HK	16	Saia Fainga'a		(substituted on) 66'	(substituted off) 69'	(substituted on) 74'
PR	17	Scott Sio		(substituted on) 64'
PR	18	Ben Alexander		(substituted on) 46'
FL	19	Ben McCalman		(substituted on) 30'	(substituted off) 40'	(substituted on) 70'
FL	20	Liam Gill		(substituted on) 69'
SH	21	Nic White		(substituted on) 69'
FH	22	Matt To'omua		(substituted on) 74'
FB	23	Jesse Mogg
Coach:
(Australia) Ewen McKenzie

FB	15	Zane Kirchner
RW	14	Willie le Roux
OC	13	JJ Engelbrecht
IC	12	Jean de Villiers (c)		(substituted off) 70'
LW	11	Bryan Habana
FH	10	Morné Steyn		(substituted off) 70'
SH	9	Ruan Pienaar		(substituted off) 75'
N8	8	Duane Vermeulen
OF	7	Willem Alberts	(yellow card) 8' to 18'
BF	6	Francois Louw		(substituted off) 70'
RL	5	Flip van der Merwe		(substituted off) 57'
LL	4	Eben Etzebeth
TP	3	Jannie du Plessis		3' to 9'		(substituted off) 63'
HK	2	Bismarck du Plessis		(substituted off) 57'
LP	1	Tendai Mtawarira		(substituted off) 57'
Replacements:
HK	16	Adriaan Strauss		(substituted on) 57'
PR	17	Gurthrö Steenkamp		(substituted on) 57'
PR	18	Coenie Oosthuizen		(substituted on) 3'	(substituted off) 9'	(substituted on) 63'
LK	19	Juandré Kruger		(substituted on) 57'
FL	20	Siya Kolisi		(substituted on) 70'
SH	21	Jano Vermaak		(substituted on) 75'
FH	22	Pat Lambie		(substituted on) 70'
CE	23	Jan Serfontein		(substituted on) 70'
Coach:
(South Africa) Heyneke Meyer

Man of the Match:
Duane Vermeulen (South Africa)

Touch judges:
Nigel Owens (Wales)
Glen Jackson (New Zealand)
Television match official:
Ben Skeen (New Zealand)

Notes:

- Australia captain James Horwill was selected in the starting XV, but was withdrawn ahead of the match with a hamstring injury. Jake Schatz could have made his debut of the bench, but was ruled out hours before kick off with a knee injury.
- First win for South Africa at Lang Park and their first in Brisbane since 1971.
- The victory marks the biggest ever winning margin by South Africa over Australia in Australia.

=== Round 4 ===
14 September 2013
19:35 NZST (UTC+12)

(1 BP) New Zealand	29–15	South Africa
Try: Read (2) 3' c, 45' c Retallick 21' c Cane 67' m Con: Carter (1/1) 4'; Barrett (2/3) 22', 46'; Pen: Barrett (1/2) 34'	Report	Try: B. du Plessis 31' c Lambie 75' m Con: Steyn (1/2) 32'; Pen: Steyn (1/2) 9'

Eden Park, Auckland
Attendance: 47,362
Referee: Romain Poite (France)

FB	15	Israel Dagg		(substituted off) 40'
RW	14	Ben Smith
OC	13	Conrad Smith
IC	12	Ma'a Nonu	(yellow card) 74' to 80'
LW	11	Julian Savea		(substituted off) 75'
FH	10	Dan Carter		(substituted off) 15'
SH	9	Aaron Smith
N8	8	Kieran Read (c)	(yellow card) 71' to 80'
OF	7	Sam Cane		30' to 40'		70' to 75'
BF	6	Liam Messam		(substituted off) 61'
RL	5	Sam Whitelock
LL	4	Brodie Retallick
TP	3	Owen Franks		(substituted off) 64'
HK	2	Dane Coles		(substituted off) 51'
LP	1	Tony Woodcock		(substituted off) 69'
Replacements:
HK	16	Keven Mealamu		(substituted on) 51'
PR	17	Wyatt Crockett		(substituted on) 69'
PR	18	Charlie Faumuina		(substituted on) 64'
FL	19	Steve Luatua		(substituted on) 61'
FL	20	Matt Todd		(substituted on) 30'	(substituted off) 40'	(substituted on) 70'	(substituted off) 75'
SH	21	Tawera Kerr-Barlow		(substituted on) 75'
FH	22	Beauden Barrett		(substituted on) 15'
FB	23	Charles Piutau		(substituted on) 40'
Coach:
(New Zealand) Steve Hansen

FB	15	Zane Kirchner		(substituted off) 74'
RW	14	Willie le Roux		(substituted off) 68'
OC	13	JJ Engelbrecht
IC	12	Jean de Villiers (c)
LW	11	Bryan Habana
FH	10	Morné Steyn
SH	9	Ruan Pienaar		(substituted off) 69'
N8	8	Duane Vermeulen
OF	7	Willem Alberts		(substituted off) 19'	(substituted on) 26'	(substituted off) 44'
BF	6	Francois Louw		(substituted off) 74'
RL	5	Flip van der Merwe		(substituted off) 40'
LL	4	Eben Etzebeth
TP	3	Jannie du Plessis		(substituted off) 55'
HK	2	Bismarck du Plessis	(yellow card) 15' to 25' (red card) 41'
LP	1	Tendai Mtawarira		(substituted off) 55'	(substituted on) 71'
Replacements:
HK	16	Adriaan Strauss		(substituted on) 19'	(substituted off) 26'	(substituted on) 44'
PR	17	Gurthrö Steenkamp		(substituted on) 55'	(substituted off) 71'
PR	18	Coenie Oosthuizen		(substituted on) 55'
LK	19	Juandré Kruger		(substituted on) 40'
FL	20	Siya Kolisi		(substituted on) 74'
SH	21	Jano Vermaak		(substituted on) 69'
FH	22	Pat Lambie		(substituted on) 74'
CE	23	Jan Serfontein		(substituted on) 68'
Coach:
(South Africa) Heyneke Meyer

Man of the Match:
Brodie Retallick (New Zealand)

Touch judges:
Jérôme Garcès (France)
Francisco Pastrana (Argentina)
Television match official:
George Ayoub (Australian)

Notes:

- New Zealand retain the Freedom Cup.
- Owen Franks earned his 50th test cap playing for New Zealand.

14 September 2013
18:05 AWST (UTC+08)

Australia	14–13	Argentina (1 BP)
Try: Folau 27' m Pen: Lealiifano (3/5) 11', 16', 40'	Report	Try: Leguizamón 64' c Con: Hernández (1/1) 65'; Pen: Sánchez (2/3) 7', 60'

Subiaco Oval, Perth
Attendance: 18,214
Referee: Nigel Owens (Wales)

FB	15	Israel Folau
RW	14	James O'Connor
OC	13	Adam Ashley-Cooper
IC	12	Christian Lealiifano
LW	11	Nick Cummins
FH	10	Quade Cooper	(substituted off) 65'
SH	9	Nic White
N8	8	Ben Mowen (c)
OF	7	Michael Hooper
BF	6	Scott Fardy	(substituted off) 72'
RL	5	Kane Douglas	(substituted off) 50'
LL	4	Rob Simmons
TP	3	Ben Alexander	(substituted off) 59'
HK	2	Stephen Moore	(substituted off) 65'
LP	1	James Slipper	(substituted off) 45'
Replacements:
HK	16	Saia Fainga'a	(substituted on) 65'
PR	17	Scott Sio	(substituted on) 45'
PR	18	Sekope Kepu	(substituted on) 59'
LK	19	Sitaleki Timani	(substituted on) 50'
FL	20	Ben McCalman	(substituted on) 72'
SH	21	Will Genia
FH	22	Matt To'omua	(substituted on) 65'
CE	23	Tevita Kuridrani
Coach:
(Australia) Ewen McKenzie

FB	15	Juan Martín Hernández
RW	14	Horacio Agulla	(substituted off) 52'
OC	13	Gonzalo Tiesi	(substituted off) 72'
IC	12	Felipe Contepomi
LW	11	Juan Imhoff
FH	10	Nicolás Sánchez
SH	9	Tomás Cubelli	(substituted off) 61'
N8	8	Juan Manuel Leguizamón
OF	7	Pablo Matera
BF	6	Juan Martín Fernández Lobbe (c)
RL	5	Julio Farías Cabello	(substituted off) 57'
LL	4	Manuel Carizza
TP	3	Juan Figallo
HK	2	Agustín Creevy	(substituted off) 51'
LP	1	Marcos Ayerza	(substituted off) 75'
Replacements:
HK	16	Eusebio Guiñazú	(substituted on) 51'
PR	17	Nahuel Lobo	(substituted on) 75'
PR	18	Juan Pablo Orlandi
LK	19	Mariano Galarza	(substituted on) 57'
N8	20	Benjamín Macome
SH	21	Martín Landajo	(substituted on) 61'
CE	22	Santiago Fernández	(substituted on) 72'
FB	23	Lucas González Amorosino	(substituted on) 52'
Coach:
(Argentina) Santiago Phelan

Man of the Match:
Michael Hooper (Australia)

Touch judges:
George Clancy (Ireland)
Glen Jackson (New Zealand)
Television match official:
Vinny Munro (New Zealand)

Notes:

- Brumbies captain Ben Mowen became the 80th test captain for the Wallabies on just his 7th test.
- Australia retain the Puma Trophy.
- First match Australia has failed to score points in the second half since the home test v New Zealand in 2005.
- Juan Manuel Leguizamón earned his 50th test cap playing for Argentina.

=== Round 5 ===
28 September 2013
17:00 SAST (UTC+02)

South Africa	28–8	Australia
Try: Strauss 12' c Kirchner 14' c Le Roux 71' m Con: Steyn (2/3) 13', 15'; Pen: Steyn (3/3) 8', 18', 31'	Report	Try: Feauai-Sautia 77' m Pen: Lealiifano (1/1) 6'

Newlands Stadium, Cape Town
Attendance: 46,052
Referee: Jérôme Garcès (France)

FB	15	Zane Kirchner		(substituted off) 77'
RW	14	Willie le Roux
OC	13	JJ Engelbrecht		(substituted off) 57'
IC	12	Jean de Villiers (c)
LW	11	Bryan Habana
FH	10	Morné Steyn
SH	9	Fourie du Preez
N8	8	Duane Vermeulen	(yellow card) 66' to 76'
OF	7	Willem Alberts		(substituted off) 59'
BF	6	Francois Louw
RL	5	Flip van der Merwe	(yellow card) 39' to 49'	(substituted off) 59'
LL	4	Eben Etzebeth
TP	3	Jannie du Plessis		(substituted off) 66'
HK	2	Adriaan Strauss		(substituted off) 49'
LP	1	Tendai Mtawarira		(substituted off) 53'
Replacements:
HK	16	Bismarck du Plessis		(substituted on) 49'
PR	17	Gurthrö Steenkamp		(substituted on) 53'
PR	18	Coenie Oosthuizen		(substituted on) 66'
LK	19	Juandré Kruger		(substituted on) 59'
FL	20	Siya Kolisi		(substituted on) 59'
SH	21	Ruan Pienaar
FH	22	Pat Lambie		(substituted on) 77'
CE	23	Jan Serfontein		(substituted on) 57'
Coach:
(South Africa) Heyneke Meyer

FB	15	Israel Folau
RW	14	Adam Ashley-Cooper
OC	13	Tevita Kuridrani
IC	12	Christian Lealiifano		(substituted off) 72'
LW	11	Joe Tomane		(substituted off) 57'
FH	10	Quade Cooper
SH	9	Nic White		(substituted off) 40'
N8	8	Ben Mowen
OF	7	Michael Hooper	(yellow card) 27' to 38'
BF	6	Scott Fardy		(substituted off) 57'
RL	5	James Horwill (c)
LL	4	Rob Simmons		(substituted off) 66'
TP	3	Ben Alexander		(substituted off) 54'
HK	2	Stephen Moore		(substituted off) 66'
LP	1	James Slipper		(substituted off) 51'
Replacements:
HK	16	Saia Fainga'a		(substituted on) 66'
PR	17	Benn Robinson		(substituted on) 51'
PR	18	Sekope Kepu		(substituted on) 54'
LK	19	Sitaleki Timani	(yellow card) 74' to 80'	(substituted on) 66'
FL	20	Ben McCalman		(substituted on) 57'
SH	21	Will Genia		(substituted on) 40'
FH	22	Matt To'omua		(substituted on) 72'
WG	23	Chris Feauai-Sautia		(substituted on) 57'
Coach:
(Australia) Ewen McKenzie

Man of the Match:
Fourie du Preez (South Africa)

Touch judges:
Nigel Owens (Wales)
Pascal Gaüzère (France)
Television match official:
Graham Hughes (England)

Notes:

- Fly-half Morné Steyn and prop Jannie du Plessis earned their 50th caps.
- Australia winger Chris Feauai-Sautia made his international debut at the age of 19, and scored his first international try.
- South Africa claim the Mandela Challenge Plate for the first time since 2009.

28 September 2013
19:40 AST (UTC−03)

Argentina	15–33	New Zealand (1 BP)
Pen: Sánchez (4/5) 8', 15', 30', 63'; Bosch (1/2) 43'	Report	Try: Savea 22' m Cane 51' m B. Smith (2) 55' c, 79' c Con: Cruden (1/3) 55'; Barrett (1/1) 80'; Pen: Cruden (3/3) 12', 27', 45'

Estadio Ciudad de La Plata, La Plata
Attendance: 40,207
Referee: Jaco Peyper (South Africa)

FB	15	Juan Martín Hernández
RW	14	Lucas González Amorosino	(substituted off) 60'
OC	13	Marcelo Bosch
IC	12	Santiago Fernández	(substituted off) 60'
LW	11	Juan Imhoff
FH	10	Nicolás Sánchez
SH	9	Martín Landajo
N8	8	Juan Manuel Leguizamón	(substituted off) 71'
OF	7	Pablo Matera
BF	6	Juan Martín Fernández Lobbe (c)
RL	5	Patricio Albacete
LL	4	Julio Farías Cabello	(substituted off) 58'
TP	3	Juan Figallo	(substituted off) 63'
HK	2	Eusebio Guiñazú	(substituted off) 63'
LP	1	Marcos Ayerza	(substituted off) 69'
Replacements:
HK	16	Agustín Creevy	(substituted on) 63'
PR	17	Nahuel Lobo	(substituted on) 69'
PR	18	Juan Pablo Orlandi	(substituted on) 63'
LK	19	Mariano Galarza	(substituted on) 58'
N8	20	Benjamín Macome	(substituted on) 71'
SH	21	Tomás Cubelli
FH	22	Felipe Contepomi	(substituted on) 60'
WG	23	Horacio Agulla	(substituted on) 60'
Coach:
(Argentina) Santiago Phelan

FB	15	Israel Dagg
RW	14	Ben Smith
OC	13	Conrad Smith
IC	12	Ma'a Nonu	(substituted off) 69'
LW	11	Julian Savea
FH	10	Aaron Cruden	(substituted off) 71'
SH	9	Aaron Smith	(substituted off) 67'
N8	8	Kieran Read (c)
OF	7	Sam Cane
BF	6	Liam Messam	(substituted off) 60'
RL	5	Sam Whitelock
LL	4	Brodie Retallick	(substituted off) 74'
TP	3	Owen Franks	(substituted off) 40'
HK	2	Andrew Hore	(substituted off) 53'
LP	1	Tony Woodcock	(substituted off) 69'
Replacements:
HK	16	Keven Mealamu	(substituted on) 53'
PR	17	Wyatt Crockett	(substituted on) 69'
PR	18	Charlie Faumuina	(substituted on) 40'
LK	19	Jeremy Thrush	(substituted on) 74'
FL	20	Steve Luatua	(substituted on) 60'
SH	21	Tawera Kerr-Barlow	(substituted on) 67'
FH	22	Beauden Barrett	(substituted on) 71'
FB	23	Charles Piutau	(substituted on) 69'
Coach:
(New Zealand) Steve Hansen

Man of the Match:
Sam Cane (New Zealand)

Touch judges:
Wayne Barnes (England)
Leighton Hodges (Wales)
Television match official:
Deon van Blommestein (South Africa)

=== Round 6 ===
5 October 2013
17:00 SAST (UTC+02)

(1 BP) South Africa	27–38	New Zealand (1 BP)
Try: Habana (2) 17' c, 19' m Le Roux 46' c De Villiers 57' m Con: Steyn (2/4) 18', 47'; Pen: Steyn (1/1) 9'	Report	Try: B. Smith 11' c Messam (2) 25' c, 40' c Barrett 60' c Read 64' c Con: Cruden (3/3) 12', 25', 40'; Barrett (2/2) 61', 65'; Pen: Barrett (1/1) 54'

Ellis Park Stadium, Johannesburg
Attendance: 60,634
Referee: Nigel Owens (Wales)

FB	15	Zane Kirchner	(substituted off) 70'
RW	14	Willie le Roux
OC	13	JJ Engelbrecht
IC	12	Jean de Villiers (c)
LW	11	Bryan Habana	(substituted off) 21'
FH	10	Morné Steyn
SH	9	Fourie du Preez	(substituted off) 70'
N8	8	Duane Vermeulen
OF	7	Willem Alberts	(substituted off) 38'
BF	6	Francois Louw
RL	5	Juandré Kruger	(substituted off) 61'
LL	4	Eben Etzebeth
TP	3	Jannie du Plessis	(substituted off) 50'
HK	2	Bismarck du Plessis	(substituted off) 50'
LP	1	Tendai Mtawarira	(substituted off) 52'
Replacements:
HK	16	Adriaan Strauss	(substituted on) 50'
PR	17	Gurthrö Steenkamp	(substituted on) 52'
PR	18	Coenie Oosthuizen	(substituted on) 50'
LK	19	Franco van der Merwe	(substituted on) 61'
FL	20	Siya Kolisi	(substituted on) 38'
SH	21	Ruan Pienaar	(substituted on) 70'
FH	22	Pat Lambie	(substituted on) 70'
CE	23	Jan Serfontein	(substituted on) 21'
Coach:
(South Africa) Heyneke Meyer

FB	15	Israel Dagg
RW	14	Ben Smith
OC	13	Conrad Smith
IC	12	Ma'a Nonu
LW	11	Julian Savea		(substituted off) 69'
FH	10	Aaron Cruden		(substituted off) 47'
SH	9	Aaron Smith		(substituted off) 69'
N8	8	Kieran Read
OF	7	Richie McCaw (c)
BF	6	Liam Messam	(yellow card) 45' to 55'	(substituted off) 63'
RL	5	Sam Whitelock
LL	4	Brodie Retallick			(substituted off) 66'
TP	3	Charlie Faumuina		(substituted off) 49'	(substituted on) 66'	(substituted off) 73'
HK	2	Andrew Hore		(substituted off) 42'
LP	1	Tony Woodcock		(substituted off) 52'
Replacements:
HK	16	Dane Coles		(substituted on) 42'
PR	17	Wyatt Crockett		(substituted on) 52'
PR	18	Ben Franks	(yellow card) 62' to 72'	(substituted on) 49'
FL	19	Steve Luatua		(substituted on) 63'
FL	20	Sam Cane				(substituted on) 73'
SH	21	Tawera Kerr-Barlow		(substituted on) 69'
FH	22	Beauden Barrett		(substituted on) 47'
WG	23	Charles Piutau		(substituted on) 69'
Coach:
(New Zealand) Steve Hansen

Man of the Match:
Kieran Read (New Zealand)

Touch judges:
John Lacey (Ireland)
Greg Garner (England)
Television match official:
Graham Hughes (England)

Notes:

- South African Tendai Mtawarira earns his 50th test cap.
- Franco van der Merwe made his international debut for South Africa.
- Ben Smith scored his 8th try of the tournament, a new record in either the Rugby Championship / Tri Nations.
- New Zealand centre pairing Conrad Smith and Ma'a Nonu surpass the 50 starts shared by Ireland pair Brian O'Driscoll and Gordon D'Arcy to become the most-capped centre pairing.

5 October 2013
19:40 AST (UTC−03)

Argentina	17–54	Australia (1 BP)
Try: Bosch 36' c Landajo 48' c Con: Sánchez (2/2) 37', 48'; Pen: Sánchez (1/1) 28'	Report	Try: Folau (3) 2' c, 34' c, 41' c Ashley-Cooper 32' m Tomane 63' m Robinson 73' c Foley 78' c Con: Lealiifano (2/3) 3', 35'; Cooper (1/2) 42'; Foley (2/2) 74', 79'; Pen: Lealiifano (2/2) 24', 30'; Cooper (1/1) 55'

Estadio Gigante de Arroyito, Rosario
Attendance: 28,570
Referee: Wayne Barnes (England)

FB	15	Juan Martín Hernández
RW	14	Horacio Agulla
OC	13	Marcelo Bosch
IC	12	Felipe Contepomi		(substituted off) 66'
LW	11	Juan Imhoff		(substituted off) 66'
FH	10	Nicolás Sánchez
SH	9	Martín Landajo		(substituted off) 72'
N8	8	Juan Manuel Leguizamón		(substituted off) 75'
OF	7	Pablo Matera	(yellow card) 30' to 40'
BF	6	Juan Martín Fernández Lobbe (c)
RL	5	Patricio Albacete
LL	4	Julio Farías Cabello		(substituted off) 50'
TP	3	Juan Pablo Orlandi		(substituted off) 45'
HK	2	Eusebio Guiñazú		(substituted off) 66'
LP	1	Marcos Ayerza		(substituted off) 72'
Replacements:
HK	16	Agustín Creevy		(substituted on) 66'
PR	17	Nahuel Lobo		(substituted on) 72'
PR	18	Matías Díaz		(substituted on) 45'
LK	19	Manuel Carizza		(substituted on) 50'
FL	20	Benjamín Macome		(substituted on) 75'
SH	21	Tomás Cubelli		(substituted on) 72'
CE	22	Santiago Fernández		(substituted on) 66'
FB	23	Lucas González Amorosino		(substituted on) 66'
Coach:
(Argentina) Santiago Phelan

FB	15	Israel Folau
RW	14	Adam Ashley-Cooper
OC	13	Tevita Kuridrani
IC	12	Christian Lealiifano		(substituted off) 40'
LW	11	Joe Tomane
FH	10	Quade Cooper		(substituted off) 65'
SH	9	Will Genia		(substituted off) 74'
N8	8	Ben Mowen
OF	7	Michael Hooper
BF	6	Scott Fardy		(substituted off) 15'	(substituted on) 25'	(substituted off) 69'
RL	5	James Horwill (c)		(substituted off) 60'
LL	4	Rob Simmons	(yellow card) 51' to 61'
TP	3	Ben Alexander		(substituted off) 47'
HK	2	Stephen Moore		(substituted off) 47'
LP	1	James Slipper	(yellow card) 14' to 24'	(substituted off) 60'
Replacements:
HK	16	Saia Fainga'a		(substituted on) 47'
PR	17	Benn Robinson		(substituted on) 15'	(substituted off) 25'	(substituted on) 60'
PR	18	Sekope Kepu		(substituted on) 47'
LK	19	Sitaleki Timani		(substituted on) 60'
FL	20	Ben McCalman				(substituted on) 69'
SH	21	Nic White		(substituted on) 74'
FH	22	Matt To'omua		(substituted on) 40'
FH	23	Bernard Foley		(substituted on) 65'
Coach:
(Australia) Ewen McKenzie

Man of the Match:
Scott Fardy (Australia)

Touch judges:
Jaco Peyper (South Africa)
Leighton Hodges (Wales)
Television match official:
Ben Skeen (New Zealand)

Notes:

- Bernard Foley made his international debut for Australia, and scored his first international try.
- Felipe Contepomi made his final appearance for Argentina.
- First bonus point win for Australia in The Rugby Championship, and the most points scores in either the Rugby Championship / Tri Nations

== Warm-up matches ==
On 3 August and 9 August, Argentina played two uncapped matches against a New South Wales Waratahs Barbarians team in La Plata and in Salta in preparation for the tournament. The NSW Barbarians was composed of 21 Waratahs players (mostly players not involved in the Australian set-up for the championship) and 13 Shute Shield players.

3 August 2013	Argentina	29–27	NSW Barbarians	La Plata Rugby Club, La Plata
18:40 ART (UTC-3)	Try: Agulla 2' c Creevy 63' m, 66' m Con: Hernández (1/3) 3'; Pen: Hernández (2/4) 26', 55'; Sánchez (2/2) 75', 80'	Report (In Spanish)	Try: Kepu 5' c, 40' m Betham 46' m Mitchell 60' c Con: McKibbin (2/4) 40', 61'; Pen: Foley (1/2) 77'	Referee: Francisco Pastrana (Argentina)

9 August 2013	Argentina	58–12	NSW Barbarians	Estadio Padre Ernesto Martearena, Salta
20:10 ART (UTC-3)	Try: Landajo 7' c Camacho 24' c, 69' c Imhoff 29' m Tuculet 34' c Leguizamón 59' c Agulla 73' c Matera 77' m Con: Contepomi (2/2) 8', 35'; Hernández (1/2) 25'; Sánchez (3/4) 60', 70', 74'; Pen: Contepomi (1/2) 5'; Hernández (1/1) 13'	Report (In Spanish)	Try: Horwitz 41' m Holloway 75' c Con: McKibbin (1/2) 76'	Referee: Juan Hernán Sylvestre (Argentina)

== Squads ==
Nation	Match venues			Head coach	Captain
Nation	Name	City	Capacity	Head coach	Captain
Argentina	Estadio Ciudad de La Plata	La Plata	53,000	(Argentina) Santiago Phelan	Juan Martín Fernández Lobbe; Felipe Contepomi (Note: Captain Fernández Lobbe was ruled out of the opening two fixtures due to a calf injury, and with his absence, Contepomi was given captaincy for this fixture.)
Argentina	Estadio Gigante de Arroyito	Rosario	41,654	(Argentina) Santiago Phelan	Juan Martín Fernández Lobbe; Felipe Contepomi
Argentina	Estadio Malvinas Argentinas	Mendoza	40,268	(Argentina) Santiago Phelan	Juan Martín Fernández Lobbe; Felipe Contepomi
Australia	Stadium Australia	Sydney	84,000	(Australia) Ewen McKenzie	James Horwill; Will Genia (Note: Captain James Horwill was ruled out of rounds 3 and 4 with a hamstring injury. In his absence, Will Genia became captain for round 3.); Ben Mowen (Note: Stand-in captain Will Genia was selected on the bench for round 4, and Ben Mowen became captain for this fixture.)
Australia	Lang Park	Brisbane	52,500	(Australia) Ewen McKenzie	James Horwill; Will Genia; Ben Mowen
Australia	Subiaco Oval	Perth	43,500	(Australia) Ewen McKenzie	James Horwill; Will Genia; Ben Mowen
New Zealand	Eden Park	Auckland	50,000	(New Zealand) Steve Hansen	Richie McCaw; Kieran Read (Note: Captain McCaw was ruled out of rounds 4 and 5 due to an injury. In his absence, Kieran Read became captain.)
New Zealand	Wellington Regional Stadium	Wellington	36,000	(New Zealand) Steve Hansen	Richie McCaw; Kieran Read
New Zealand	Waikato Stadium	Hamilton	25,800	(New Zealand) Steve Hansen	Richie McCaw; Kieran Read
South Africa	FNB Stadium	Johannesburg	94,736	(South Africa) Heyneke Meyer	Jean de Villiers
South Africa	Ellis Park Stadium	Johannesburg	62,567	(South Africa) Heyneke Meyer	Jean de Villiers
South Africa	Newlands Stadium	Cape Town	51,900	(South Africa) Heyneke Meyer	Jean de Villiers

Note: Ages, Caps and Clubs are off the starting date of the tournament (17 August 2013).

=== Argentina ===
Argentina 30-man Squad for the Championship was announced on 25 June.

Tomás Lavanini was added to the squad to cover the second row.

Note: Flags indicate national union for the club/province as defined by World Rugby.

Player	Position	Date of birth (age)	Caps	Club/province
Agustín Creevy	Hooker	15 March 1985 (aged 28)	22	(England) Worcester Warriors
Eusebio Guiñazú	Hooker	15 January 1982 (aged 31)	27	(England) Bath
Marcos Ayerza	Prop	12 January 1983 (aged 30)	40	(England) Leicester Tigers
Matías Díaz	Prop	16 March 1993 (aged 20)	3	(Argentina) Teqüe
Juan Figallo	Prop	25 March 1988 (aged 25)	17	(France) Montpellier
Nahuel Lobo	Prop	27 August 1991 (aged 21)	2	(England) Newcastle Falcons
Juan Pablo Orlandi	Prop	20 June 1983 (aged 30)	10	(England) Bath
Patricio Albacete	Lock	9 February 1981 (aged 32)	52	(France) Toulouse
Manuel Carizza	Lock	23 August 1984 (aged 28)	32	Unattached
Mariano Galarza	Lock	11 December 1986 (aged 26)	12	(Argentina) La Plata Uni.
Tomás Lavanini	Lock	22 January 1993 (aged 20)	2	(Argentina) Hindú
Julio Farías Cabello	Flanker	19 September 1978 (aged 34)	21	(Argentina) Tucumán
Juan Manuel Leguizamón	Flanker	6 June 1983 (aged 30)	46	(France) Lyon
Pablo Matera	Flanker	18 July 1993 (aged 20)	2	(Argentina) Alumni
Leonardo Senatore	Flanker	13 May 1984 (aged 29)	17	(England) Worcester Warriors
Juan Martín Fernández Lobbe (c)	Number 8	19 November 1981 (aged 31)	52	(France) Toulon
Benjamín Macome	Number 8	10 January 1986 (aged 27)	11	(Argentina) Tucumán
Tomás Cubelli	Scrum-half	12 June 1989 (aged 24)	13	(Argentina) Belgrano
Martín Landajo	Scrum-half	14 June 1988 (aged 25)	18	(Argentina) C.A.S.I.
Felipe Contepomi	Fly-half	20 August 1977 (aged 35)	81	(Argentina) Club Newman
Nicolás Sánchez	Fly-half	26 October 1988 (aged 24)	8	(France) Bordeaux Bègles
Marcelo Bosch	Centre	7 January 1984 (aged 29)	18	(England) Saracens
Santiago Fernández	Centre	28 November 1985 (aged 27)	25	Unattached
Martín Rodríguez	Centre	12 April 1985 (aged 28)	19	(France) Stade Français
Gonzalo Tiesi	Centre	24 April 1985 (aged 28)	35	Unattached
Joaquín Tuculet	Centre	8 August 1989 (aged 24)	5	Unattached
Horacio Agulla	Wing	22 October 1984 (aged 28)	42	(England) Bath
Gonzalo Camacho	Wing	28 August 1984 (aged 28)	20	(England) Leicester Tigers
Juan Imhoff	Wing	11 May 1988 (aged 25)	14	(France) Racing Métro
Lucas González Amorosino	Fullback	2 November 1985 (aged 27)	21	Unattached
Juan Martín Hernández	Fullback	7 August 1982 (aged 31)	39	(France) Racing Métro

=== Australia ===
Australia 30-man squad for the Championship, including 8 uncapped players and the re-call of Fly Half Quade Cooper.

With captain James Horwill ruled out of round's 3 and 4 and with Hugh McMeniman also out injured, Sitaleki Timani was brought into the squad as cover for the second row, but kept his place in the squad for the final two rounds. Dave Dennis was added to the squad to replace Jake Schatz who was ruled out of the championship after picking up an injury in training ahead of round 3.

Benn Robinson and Chris Feauai-Sautia were added to the squad for the away fixtures against South Africa and Argentina, with Nick Cummins and Jesse Mogg withdrawn from the squad due to injury.

James O'Connor was removed from the squad on 20 September following an off-field incident that occurred following the Wallabies win over Argentina in round 4. Uncapped player Peter Betham was called in as his replacement.

Note: Flags indicate national union for the club/province as defined by World Rugby.

Player	Position	Date of birth (age)	Caps	Club/province
Albert Anae	Hooker	21 June 1989 (aged 24)	0	(Australia) Reds
Saia Fainga'a	Hooker	2 February 1987 (aged 26)	19	(Australia) Reds
Stephen Moore	Hooker	20 January 1983 (aged 30)	79	(Australia) Brumbies
Ben Alexander	Prop	13 November 1984 (aged 28)	51	(Australia) Brumbies
Sekope Kepu	Prop	5 February 1986 (aged 27)	26	(Australia) Waratahs
Benn Robinson	Prop	19 July 1984 (aged 29)	59	(Australia) Waratahs
Scott Sio	Prop	16 October 1991 (aged 21)	0	(Australia) Brumbies
James Slipper	Prop	6 June 1989 (aged 24)	37	(Australia) Reds
Kane Douglas	Lock	1 June 1989 (aged 24)	9	(Australia) Waratahs
Scott Fardy	Lock	5 July 1984 (aged 29)	0	(Australia) Brumbies
James Horwill (c)	Lock	29 May 1985 (aged 28)	38	(Australia) Reds
Hugh McMeniman	Lock	1 November 1983 (aged 29)	21	(Australia) Force
Rob Simmons	Lock	19 April 1989 (aged 24)	26	(Australia) Reds
Sitaleki Timani	Lock	19 September 1986 (aged 26)	10	(Australia) Waratahs
Dave Dennis	Flanker	10 January 1986 (aged 27)	15	(Australia) Waratahs
Liam Gill	Flanker	8 June 1992 (aged 21)	10	(Australia) Reds
Michael Hooper	Flanker	29 October 1991 (aged 21)	16	(Australia) Waratahs
Ben McCalman	Flanker	18 March 1988 (aged 25)	22	(Australia) Force
Ben Mowen	Number 8	1 December 1984 (aged 28)	3	(Australia) Brumbies
Jake Schatz	Number 8	25 July 1990 (aged 23)	0	(Australia) Reds
Will Genia	Scrum-half	17 January 1988 (aged 25)	44	(Australia) Reds
Nic White	Scrum-half	13 June 1990 (aged 23)	0	(Australia) Brumbies
Quade Cooper	Fly-half	5 April 1988 (aged 25)	38	(Australia) Reds
Bernard Foley	Fly-half	8 September 1989 (aged 23)	0	(Australia) Waratahs
Matt To'omua	Fly-half	1 February 1990 (aged 23)	0	(Australia) Brumbies
Adam Ashley-Cooper	Centre	27 March 1984 (aged 29)	80	(Australia) Waratahs
Tevita Kuridrani	Centre	31 March 1991 (aged 22)	0	(Australia) Brumbies
Christian Lealiifano	Centre	24 September 1987 (aged 25)	3	(Australia) Brumbies
Peter Betham	Wing	6 January 1989 (aged 24)	0	(Australia) Waratahs
Nick Cummins	Wing	5 October 1987 (aged 25)	6	(Australia) Force
Chris Feauai-Sautia	Wing	17 November 1993 (aged 19)	0	(Australia) Reds
James O'Connor	Wing	5 July 1990 (aged 23)	40	(Australia) Rebels
Joe Tomane	Wing	2 February 1990 (aged 23)	3	(Australia) Brumbies
Israel Folau	Fullback	3 April 1989 (aged 24)	3	(Australia) Waratahs
Jesse Mogg	Fullback	8 June 1989 (aged 24)	1	(Australia) Brumbies

=== New Zealand ===
New Zealand 28-man squad for the Championship was announced on 4 August. Joe Moody was included in the squad as injury cover for Wyatt Crockett – who had a knee injury. Three additional players will assemble with the squad as part of the wider training squad, but will be released to their provincial sides on the Wednesday of each Test match; these players are: Frank Halai, Jeremy Thrush, and Francis Saili. Following an injury to Francis Saili, Centre Ryan Crotty was added to the training squad but will be released to his provincial side along with Halai and Thrush.

With Dan Carter out for the opening two tests, and with Aaron Cruden and Beauden Barrett injured after the opening round with a knee and calf injury, Colin Slade and Tom Taylor were called into the squad as cover for the First five-eighths. Luke Whitelock was also drafted in to replace Luke Romano (groin injury) and Brad Shields to cover sidelined Liam Messam (hamstring strain). Rhys Marshall spent time with the squad as an apprentice hooker as did Liam Coltman and Nathan Harris. Matt Todd was called in after round 3 to replace the injured Captain Richie McCaw, who was ruled out of the championship following an injury.

Following an injury to TJ Perenara, Piri Weepu was called up to the squad for the final two rounds against Argentina and South Africa both away.

Note: Flags indicate national union for the club/province as defined by World Rugby.

Player	Position	Date of birth (age)	Caps	Club/province
Dane Coles	Hooker	10 December 1986 (aged 26)	6	(New Zealand) Wellington / Hurricanes
Andrew Hore	Hooker	13 September 1978 (aged 34)	76	(New Zealand) Taranaki / Highlanders
Keven Mealamu	Hooker	20 March 1979 (aged 34)	104	(New Zealand) Auckland / Blues
Wyatt Crockett	Prop	24 January 1983 (aged 30)	14	(New Zealand) Canterbury / Crusaders
Charlie Faumuina	Prop	24 December 1986 (aged 26)	7	(New Zealand) Auckland / Blues
Ben Franks	Prop	27 March 1984 (aged 29)	25	(New Zealand) Hawke's Bay / Hurricanes
Owen Franks	Prop	23 December 1987 (aged 25)	47	(New Zealand) Canterbury / Crusaders
Joe Moody ‡	Prop	18 September 1988 (aged 24)	0	(New Zealand) Canterbury / Crusaders
Tony Woodcock	Prop	27 January 1981 (aged 32)	98	(New Zealand) North Harbour / Highlanders
Brodie Retallick	Lock	31 May 1991 (aged 22)	14	(New Zealand) Bay of Plenty / Chiefs
Luke Romano	Lock	16 February 1986 (aged 27)	14	(New Zealand) Canterbury / Crusaders
Jeremy Thrush *	Lock	19 April 1985 (aged 28)	1	(New Zealand) Wellington / Hurricanes
Sam Whitelock	Lock	12 October 1988 (aged 24)	41	(New Zealand) Canterbury / Crusaders
Sam Cane	Flanker	13 January 1992 (aged 21)	7	(New Zealand) Bay of Plenty / Chiefs
Steve Luatua	Flanker	29 April 1991 (aged 22)	1	(New Zealand) Auckland / Blues
Richie McCaw (c)	Flanker	31 December 1980 (aged 32)	116	(New Zealand) Canterbury / Crusaders
Liam Messam	Flanker	25 March 1984 (aged 29)	22	(New Zealand) Waikato / Chiefs
Brad Shields	Flanker	2 April 1991 (aged 22)	0	(New Zealand) Wellington / Hurricanes
Matt Todd	Flanker	24 March 1988 (aged 25)	1	(New Zealand) Canterbury / Crusaders
Luke Whitelock	Flanker	29 January 1991 (aged 22)	0	(New Zealand) Canterbury / Crusaders
Kieran Read	Number 8	26 October 1985 (aged 27)	51	(New Zealand) Canterbury / Crusaders
Tawera Kerr-Barlow	Half-back	15 August 1990 (aged 23)	4	(New Zealand) Waikato / Chiefs
TJ Perenara	Half-back	23 January 1992 (aged 21)	0	(New Zealand) Wellington / Hurricanes
Aaron Smith	Half-back	21 November 1988 (aged 24)	15	(New Zealand) Manawatu / Highlanders
Piri Weepu	Half-back	7 September 1983 (aged 29)	71	(New Zealand) Auckland / Blues
Beauden Barrett	First five-eighth	27 May 1991 (aged 22)	8	(New Zealand) Taranaki / Hurricanes
Dan Carter	First five-eighth	5 March 1982 (aged 31)	95	(New Zealand) Canterbury / Crusaders
Aaron Cruden	First five-eighth	8 January 1989 (aged 24)	22	(New Zealand) Manawatu / Chiefs
Colin Slade	First five-eighth	10 October 1987 (aged 25)	10	(New Zealand) Canterbury / Highlanders
Tom Taylor	First five-eighth	11 March 1989 (aged 24)	0	(New Zealand) Canterbury / Crusaders
Ryan Crotty *	Centre	23 September 1988 (aged 24)	1	(New Zealand) Canterbury / Crusaders
Ma'a Nonu	Centre	21 May 1982 (aged 31)	79	(New Zealand) Wellington / Highlanders
Francis Saili *	Centre	16 February 1991 (aged 22)	0	(New Zealand) North Harbour / Blues
Conrad Smith	Centre	12 October 1981 (aged 31)	69	(New Zealand) Wellington / Hurricanes
Frank Halai *	Wing	6 March 1988 (aged 25)	0	(New Zealand) Counties Manukau / Blues
Julian Savea	Wing	7 August 1990 (aged 23)	11	(New Zealand) Wellington / Hurricanes
Ben Smith	Wing	1 June 1986 (aged 27)	15	(New Zealand) Otago / Highlanders
Charles Piutau	Fullback	31 October 1991 (aged 21)	1	(New Zealand) Auckland / Blues
Israel Dagg	Fullback	6 June 1988 (aged 25)	28	(New Zealand) Hawke's Bay / Crusaders

‡ – Included as injury cover for Wyatt Crockett.
* – Part of the wider training squad

=== South Africa ===
South Africa 30-man squad for the Championship was announced on 3 August 2013.

On 18 August Lourens Adriaanse was added as a replacement for Trevor Nyakane, who was removed from the squad following repeated breaches of team protocol (he missed the bus and the team's flight to Argentina).

Pieter-Steph du Toit was added to the squad for the final two rounds with Australia and New Zealand playing at home.

Note: Flags indicate national union for the club/province as defined by World Rugby.

Player	Position	Date of birth (age)	Caps	Club/province
Bismarck du Plessis	Hooker	22 May 1984 (aged 29)	48	(South Africa) Sharks
Chiliboy Ralepelle	Hooker	11 September 1986 (aged 26)	22	(France) Toulouse
Adriaan Strauss	Hooker	18 November 1985 (aged 27)	24	(South Africa) Cheetahs
Lourens Adriaanse	Prop	5 February 1988 (aged 25)	0	(South Africa) Sharks
Jannie du Plessis	Prop	16 November 1982 (aged 30)	45	(South Africa) Sharks
Tendai Mtawarira	Prop	1 August 1985 (aged 28)	44	(South Africa) Sharks
Trevor Nyakane	Prop	4 May 1989 (aged 24)	3	(South Africa) Cheetahs
Coenie Oosthuizen	Prop	22 March 1989 (aged 24)	5	(South Africa) Cheetahs
Gurthrö Steenkamp	Prop	12 June 1981 (aged 32)	40	(France) Toulouse
Eben Etzebeth	Lock	29 October 1991 (aged 21)	14	(South Africa) Stormers
Juandré Kruger	Lock	6 September 1985 (aged 27)	11	(France) Racing Métro
Flip van der Merwe	Lock	6 June 1985 (aged 28)	26	(South Africa) Bulls
Pieter-Steph du Toit	Lock	20 August 1992 (aged 20)	0	(South Africa) Sharks
Franco van der Merwe	Lock	15 March 1983 (aged 30)	0	(South Africa) Lions
Willem Alberts	Flanker	11 May 1984 (aged 29)	21	(South Africa) Sharks
Marcell Coetzee	Flanker	8 May 1991 (aged 22)	13	(South Africa) Sharks
Siya Kolisi	Flanker	16 June 1991 (aged 22)	2	(South Africa) Stormers
Francois Louw	Flanker	15 June 1985 (aged 28)	19	(England) Bath
Duane Vermeulen	Number 8	3 July 1986 (aged 27)	7	(South Africa) Stormers
Fourie du Preez	Scrum-half	24 March 1982 (aged 31)	62	(Japan) Suntory Sungoliath
Ruan Pienaar	Scrum-half	10 March 1984 (aged 29)	66	(Republic of Ireland) Ulster
Piet van Zyl ‡	Scrum-half	14 September 1989 (aged 23)	2	(South Africa) Bulls
Jano Vermaak	Scrum-half	1 January 1985 (aged 28)	1	(France) Toulouse
Pat Lambie	Fly-half	17 October 1990 (aged 22)	23	(South Africa) Sharks
Morné Steyn	Fly-half	11 July 1984 (aged 29)	45	(France) Stade Français
Juan de Jongh	Centre	15 April 1988 (aged 25)	14	(South Africa) Stormers
Jean de Villiers (c)	Centre	24 February 1981 (aged 32)	87	(South Africa) Stormers
JJ Engelbrecht	Centre	22 February 1989 (aged 24)	4	(South Africa) Bulls
Jan Serfontein	Centre	15 April 1993 (aged 20)	3	(South Africa) Bulls
Bjorn Basson	Wing	11 February 1987 (aged 26)	9	(South Africa) Bulls
Bryan Habana	Wing	12 June 1983 (aged 30)	86	(France) Toulon
Zane Kirchner	Fullback	16 June 1984 (aged 29)	24	(Republic of Ireland) Leinster
Willie le Roux	Fullback	18 August 1989 (aged 23)	3	(South Africa) Cheetahs

‡ – Included to cover Fourie du Preez when he is unavailable to play for South Africa

== Statistics ==
=== Points scorers ===
Pos	Name	Team	Pts
1	Morné Steyn	South Africa	88
2	Christian Lealiifano	Australia	64
3	Ben Smith	New Zealand	40
4	Aaron Cruden	New Zealand	37
5	Nicolás Sánchez	Argentina	33
6	Beauden Barrett	New Zealand	26
7	Israel Folau	Australia	25
8	Felipe Contepomi	Argentina	20
9	Bryan Habana	South Africa	15
9	Juan Manuel Leguizamón	Argentina	15
9	Kieran Read	New Zealand	15
9	Willie le Roux	South Africa	15
9	Jean de Villiers	South Africa	15

=== Try scorers ===
Pos	Name	Team	Tries
1	Ben Smith	New Zealand	8
2	Israel Folau	Australia	5
3	Bryan Habana	South Africa	3
3	Juan Manuel Leguizamón	Argentina	3
3	Kieran Read	New Zealand	3
3	Willie le Roux	South Africa	3
3	Jean de Villiers	South Africa	3
8	Marcelo Bosch	Argentina	2
8	Sam Cane	New Zealand	2
8	Zane Kirchner	South Africa	2
8	Liam Messam	New Zealand	2
8	Bismarck du Plessis	South Africa	2
8	Julian Savea	New Zealand	2
8	Aaron Smith	New Zealand	2
8	Adriaan Strauss	South Africa	2

== See also ==
- History of rugby union matches between Argentina and Australia
- History of rugby union matches between Argentina and New Zealand
- History of rugby union matches between Argentina and South Africa
- History of rugby union matches between Australia and South Africa
- History of rugby union matches between Australia and New Zealand
- History of rugby union matches between New Zealand and South Africa
