= Duane Vermeulen =

South African rugby union player (born 1986)

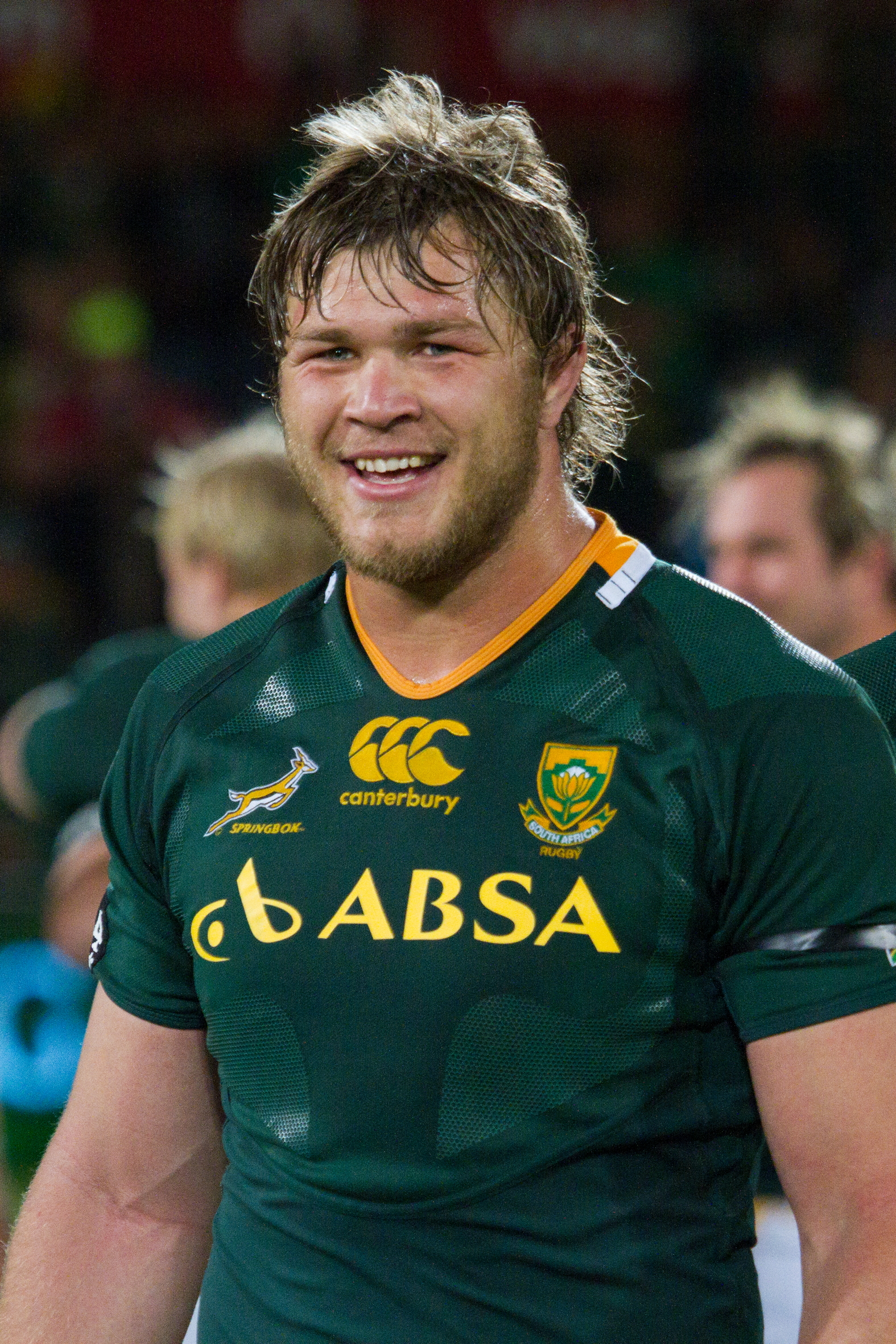
- Vermeulen in 2012
- Full name: Daniel Johannes Vermeulen
- Born: 3 July 1986 (age 40) Nelspruit, South Africa
- Height: 1.93 m (6 ft 4 in)
- Weight: 120 kg (265 lb; 18 st 13 lb)
- School: Hoërskool Nelspruit

Rugby union career
- Position: Loose forward
Youth career
- 2004–2005: Pumas
Senior career
Years	Team	Apps	(Points)
2005–2007	Pumas	26	(20)
2007–2008	Free State Cheetahs	28	(10)
2007–2008	Cheetahs	20	(15)
2009–2015	Western Province	38	(35)
2009–2015	Stormers	89	(25)
2015–2018	Toulon	68	(10)
2018–2020	Kubota Spears	13	(15)
2019–2021	Bulls	23	(10)
2020–2021	Blue Bulls	6	(0)
2021–2023	Ulster	34	(15)
International career
Years	Team	Apps	(Points)
2009	Emerging Springboks	1	(0)
2012–2023	South Africa	76	(15)
Coaching career
- Years: Team
- 2025–: South Africa (Assistant Coach)
Medal record
Men's Rugby union
Representing South Africa
Rugby World Cup
Bronze medal – third place	2015 England	Squad
Gold medal – first place	2019 Japan	Squad
Gold medal – first place	2023 France	Squad

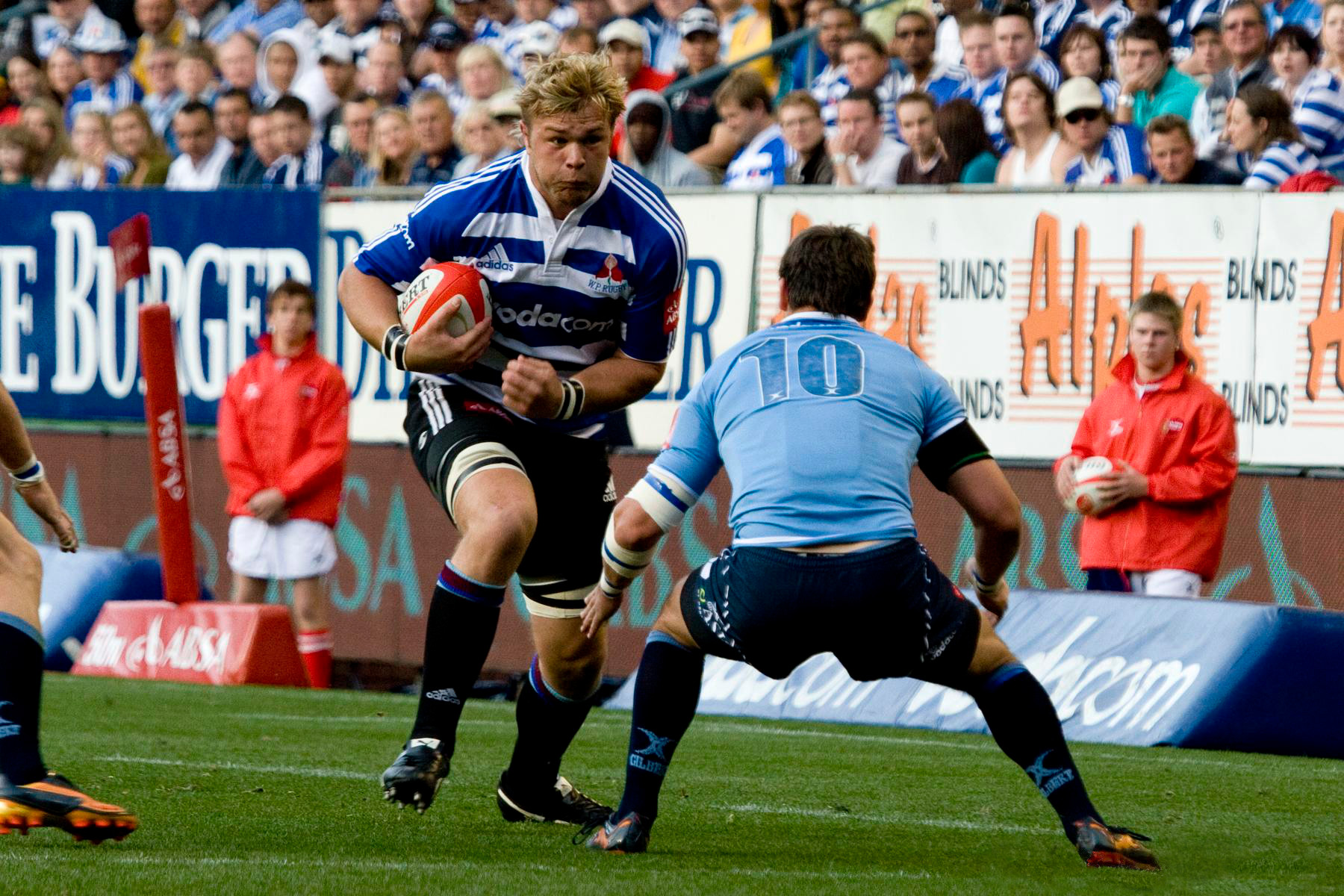
Vermeulen playing for Western Province in 2010

Daniel Johannes "Duane" Vermeulen (born 3 July 1986) is a South African former professional rugby union player who previously played for the South Africa national team. He also previously played for Ulster Rugby in the United Rugby Championship, Vodacom Blue Bulls and the Pumas, Free State Cheetahs and Western Province in South African domestic rugby, the Cheetahs, Stormers and Bulls in Super Rugby and Toulon in the Top 14. He was an instrumental part of South Africa winning the 2019 Rugby World Cup and received the Man of the Match award in the final. Vermeulen played as a Number eight but he was equally adept at playing both blindside and openside flanker. Nicknamed “Thor”, he is known for his physical strength, anticipation under the high ball and leadership abilities. He is widely regarded as one of the best Number Eights in South African Rugby history.

== Background ==
Vermeulen's father died from cancer in c.1997. When Vermeulen was only 10/11 years old.

== Club career ==
Vermeulen began his career in the Free State, playing for the Free State Cheetahs in the Currie Cup and the Cheetahs in the Super 14. He eventually followed his former coach Rassie Erasmus and joined the much larger and more competitive Western Province rugby union in 2009 after three seasons with the Free State. He put in some strong displays for the Stormers in the 2010 Super 14 season, where the Stormers made it all the way to the final.

Injuries plagued Vermeulen's 2011 and early 2012 seasons, however, after playing just nine games of Super Rugby, was selected as part of Heyneke Meyer's squad for the away leg of the Rugby Championship.

Vermeulen has twice won the Currie Cup, in 2007 with the Free State and in 2012 with Western Province. He was named captain of the Stormers for the 2015 Super Rugby season. While out with a neck injury, in June 2015 Vermeulen flew to France to be unveiled as a post-2015 Rugby World Cup signing for Top 14 club Toulon.

After a short spell in Japan with Kubota Spears, Vermeulen travelled back to his home nation of South Africa as a Bulls-player, signing in October 2018.

On 16 September 2021, it was announced that Vermeulen would join Irish province Ulster in the United Rugby Championship for the 2021–22 season. Vermeulen made his Ulster debut on 11 December 2021 in the European Rugby Champions Cup, against Clermont Auvergne. He spent two seasons with the Irish province, leaving at the end of the 2022–23 season.

== International career ==
Before his first full international cap, Vermeulen represented South Africa at the second level of international rugby, appearing for the Emerging Springboks. One highlight of his appearances for the Emerging Boks was being in the squad that performed against the British & Irish Lions, holding them to a 13–13 draw, during their tour to South Africa in 2009.

Vermeulen looked like being a certain selection for the Springboks, Vermeulen was not called into the Springbok squad that faced Wales, Italy and France. He was also omitted from the Springboks 2010 Tri Nations Series squad. After a stand out Currie Cup domestic Rugby Season, Vermeulen was named as part of the 39-man preliminary training squad ahead of the 2010 end of year grand slam tour to the Northern Hemisphere. He was once again overlooked for selection in the final squad.

Vermeulen made his international debut for South Africa on 8 September 2012, where he formed part of the starting lineup going up against Australia. He was selected again to start the following week against New Zealand in Dunedin, where South Africa lost by 10 points. On 29 September 2012, South Africa beat Australia 31–8, a victory which marked Vermeulen's first Springbok win.

He was selected for the Springboks' 2012 Northern Hemisphere tour. Vermeulen received a man of the match award for his performance against England at Twickenham during this tour, based on a number of vital turnovers on the ground, 15 hard tackles, and his role of primary ball carrier on the day. In 2014, he was one of five nominees for the IRB Player of the Year award.

Vermeulen played in the 2019 Rugby World Cup Final against England. He was part of the South African team that won their third World Cup at the Yokohama Stadium in Japan. He was awarded a man of the match award for his performance where he made a number of vital contributions, including 10 carries, making 49 metres (both the most in the match) and 2 turnovers.

Vermeulen was called up by the Springboks at the 2023 Rugby World Cup and the team went on and win the World Cup once again after the 2019.

Vermeulen announced his retirement from rugby on 8 November 2023.

In November 2025, ahead of the final fixture in the 2025 Autumn Nations Series against Wales, South Africa head coach Rassie Erasmus mentioned the possibility of Vermeulen, who had taken up a role as an assistant coach with the team, coming out of retirement in the event of a late injury crisis ahead of the game. No injuries were reported and he did not play the fixture.

== Honours ==
- SARU Rugby Player of the Year 2014
- Super Rugby Player of Year 2014
- IRB Player of the Year – Nominee – 2014
- Super Rugby and Unlocked Player of Year 2020
- SA Rugby Player of the Year for 2020
- Currie Cup 1st division - Pumes 2004
- Currie Cup winner - Cheetahs 2007, Western Province 2012, Bulls 2020–21
- World Cup Winner 2019, 2023
- Rugby Championship Winner 2019

=== Test Match Record ===
Against	P	W	D	L	Tri	Pts	%Won
Argentina	8	8	0	0	1	5	100
Australia	11	6	0	5	0	0	54.55
England	9	6	0	3	1	5	66.67
France	4	4	0	0	0	0	100
Ireland	4	2	0	2	0	0	50
Italy	3	3	0	0	0	0	100
Japan	2	2	0	0	0	0	100
New Zealand	15	4	1	10	0	0	26.67
Romania	1	1	0	0	0	0	100
Samoa	1	1	0	0	0	0	100
Scotland	7	7	0	0	0	0	100
Tonga	1	1	0	0	0	0	100
United States	1	1	0	0	0	0	100
Wales	9	7	0	2	1	5	77.78
Total	76	53	1	22	3	15	69.74

Pld = Games Played, W = Games Won, D = Games Drawn, L = Games Lost, Tri = Tries Scored, Pts = Points Scored

=== International Tries ===
Try	Opposing team	Location	Venue	Competition	Date	Result
1	Argentina	Soweto, South Africa	FNB Stadium	2013 Rugby Championship	17 August 2013	Won 73–13
2	Wales	Durban, South Africa	Kings Park	Mid-year rugby test series	14 June 2014	Won 38–16
3	England	Bloemfontein, South Africa	Toyota Stadium	Mid-year rugby test series	16 June 2018	Won 23–12

== Super Rugby statistics ==
As of 3 March 2021

Season	Team	Games	Starts	Sub	Mins	Tries	Points	Yellow card	Red card
2007	Cheetahs	7	5	2	437	0	0	1	0
2008	Cheetahs	13	12	1	949	3	15	0	0
2009	Stormers	13	13	0	1040	0	0	0	0
2010	Stormers	15	15	0	1186	2	10	0	0
2011	Stormers	16	15	1	1178	0	0	1	0
2012	Stormers	8	8	0	640	0	0	0	0
2013	Stormers	10	10	0	791	0	0	1	0
2014	Stormers	16	16	0	1221	1	5	0	0
2015	Stormers	11	11	0	862	2	10	0	0
2016–2018	did not participate in Super Rugby								
2019	Bulls	19	19	0	1056	2	10	0	0
Total		123	119	4	9360	10	50	3	0

== Personal life ==
Vermeulen married wife Ezel in 2012, and they have two sons.

He has business investments in farming, honey, wine and bubble tea.
