= World Schools Rugby Festival =

International rugby union youth tournament

- Sport: Rugby union
- Founder: Heyneke Meyer
- First season: 2018
- No. of teams: 20 (boys)
- Country: Global
- Venue: Thailand 2022-present
- Most recent champion: (New Zealand) Hamilton Boys High School (NZ)
- Most titles: South Africa (3)
- Website: https://www.worldschoolsfestival.com/

The World Schools Rugby Festival is an international rugby union tournament for 15-a-side youth teams. Participation is through invitation with the aim of having the top youth rugby teams in the world compete in a Ryder Cup style format with 10 teams from South Africa and 10 teams from the Rest of the World.

== History ==
The originator of the idea of a World Schools festival was former Springbok coach Heyneke Meyer who upon joining a Hong Kong-based sports marketing firm as managing director made arranging the tournament his priority. After initially focusing on the George area Meyer was approached by parties suggesting the festival be held at Paarl Boys to celebrate their 150th birthday celebrations.

== 2018 tournament ==
The 2018 tournament was held in Paarl, South Africa in celebration of Paarl Boys High's 150th anniversary.

=== Participating teams ===
Team South Africa
Affies
Boland Landbou
Glenwood
Grey College
Hilton
Monument
Oakdale Landbou
Outeniqua
Paarl Boys
Paarl Gim

Rest of the World (NATO)
(NATO) AP Dragons
Argentina U18
(Australia) Cavaliers
(New Zealand) Christchurch Boys
(England) Hartpury College
(Italy) Italian XV
Namibia XV
(New Zealand) Napier Boys
(United States) Rhino Rugby
(United States) St Ignatius

=== Results ===
3 April 2018	Boland Landbou (South Africa)	59-26	Napier Boys (New Zealand)

3 April 2018	Outeniqua (South Africa)	91-0	St Ignatius (United States)

3 April 2018	Oakdale (South Africa)	67-7	Namibia XV

3 April 2018	Monument (South Africa)	48-14	Cavaliers (Australia)

4 April 2018	Glenwood (South Africa)	53-0	Italian XV (Italy)

4 April 2018	Paarl Gim (South Africa)	84-7	Rhino Rugby (United States)

4 April 2018	Hilton (South Africa)	35-24	AP Dragons (NATO)

4 April 2018	Affies (South Africa)	15-26	Hartpury College (England)

4 April 2018	Paarl Boys (South Africa)	10-19	Argentina U18

4 April 2018	Grey College (South Africa)	66-28	Christchurch Boys (New Zealand)

6 April 2018	Oakdale (South Africa)	67-19	St Ignatius (United States)

6 April 2018	Glenwood (South Africa)	53-7	Namibia XV

6 April 2018	Outeniqua (South Africa)	47-13	Italian XV (Italy)

6 April 2018	Monument (South Africa)	42-37	Napier Boys (New Zealand)

6 April 2018	Boland Landbou (South Africa)	67-0	Cavaliers (Australia)

7 April 2018	Hilton (South Africa)	78-19	Rhino Rugby (United States)

7 April 2018	Paarl Gim (South Africa)	38-36	Argentina U18

7 April 2018	Grey College (South Africa)	60-0	Hartpury (England)

7 April 2018	Affies (South Africa)	17-5	AP Dragons (NATO)

7 April 2018	Paarl Boys (South Africa)	25-7	Christchurch Boys (New Zealand)

=== Final standings ===
	Day
10	1	0
8	2	4
10	3	0
10	4	0
38	Overall	4

== 2019 tournament ==
The 2019 tournament was held in Stellenbosch, South Africa at Paul Roos.

=== Participating teams ===
Team South Africa
Affies
Boland Landbou
Glenwood
Grey College
Hilton
Monument
Paarl Gim
Paul Roos
SACS
Invitation XV

Rest of the World (NATO)
(NATO) AP Dragons
(New Zealand) Christchurch Boys
(England) Hartpury College
(Italy) Italian XV
(New Zealand) John McGlashan
(New Zealand) Napier Boys
(New Zealand) Southland Boys
(United States) USA XV
(NATO) World Schools XV
(Zimbabwe) Zambezi Steelers

=== Results ===
26 March 2019	Glenwood (South Africa)	32-17	John McGlashan (New Zealand)

26 March 2019	Invitation XV (South Africa)	29-76	World Schools XV (NATO)

26 March 2019	SACS (South Africa)	43-24	Zambezi Steelers (Zimbabwe)

26 March 2019	Monument (South Africa)	32-21	Hartpury (England)

26 March 2019	Paarl Gim (South Africa)	50-24	AP Dragons (NATO)

27 March 2019	Affies (South Africa)	36-12	Italian XV (Italy)

27 March 2019	Boland Landbou (South Africa)	30-25	Napier Boys (New Zealand)

27 March 2019	Hilton (South Africa)	43-0	USA XV (United States)

27 March 2019	Grey College (South Africa)	73-26	Christchurch Boys (New Zealand)

27 March 2019	Paul Roos (South Africa)	93-5	Southland Boys (New Zealand)

29 March 2019	Invitation XV (South Africa)	33-30	Zambezi Steelers (Zimbabwe)

29 March 2019	SACS (South Africa)	15-25	World Schools XV (NATO)

29 March 2019	Glenwood (South Africa)	33-10	AP Dragons (NATO)

29 March 2019	Paarl Gim (South Africa)	41-12	Hartpury (England)

29 March 2019	Monument (South Africa)	48-10	John McGlashan (New Zealand)

30 March 2019	Boland Landbou (South Africa)	71-3	USA XV (United States)

30 March 2019	Hilton (South Africa)	32-15	Italy XV

30 March 2019	Grey College (South Africa)	54-0	Southland Boys (New Zealand)

30 March 2019	Affies (South Africa)	31-31	Christchurch Boys (New Zealand)

30 March 2019	Paul Roos (South Africa)	62-7	Napier Boys (New Zealand)

=== Final standings ===
	Day
8	1	2
10	2	0
8	3	2
9	4	1
35	Overall	5

== 2020 tournament ==
The 2020 tournament was to be held in Pretoria, South Africa at Affies in celebration of their centenary year. The festival was cancelled due to the COVID-19 pandemic.

=== Participating teams ===
Before the tournament was cancelled 19 teams had committed: 10 from South Africa and 9 from the rest of the world contingent.

Team South Africa
Affies
Grey College
Hilton
KES
Maritzburg
Monument
Oakdale
Paul Roos
Pretoria Boys
SACS

Rest of the World (NATO)
(NATO) AP Dragons
(New Zealand) Kings College
(England) Hartpury College
Portugal U18
(Georgia (country)) Georgia U18
(Fiji) RKS
Uruguay U18
(Italy) Verona Academy
(United States) USA U18
(NATO) TBD

== See also ==
- Rugby union in South Africa
