= Matías Díaz =

Argentine rugby union player (born 1993)

- Born: Matías Díaz; 16 February 1993 (age 33) Mendoza, Argentina
- Height: 1.85 m (6 ft 1 in)
- Weight: 115 kg (18 st 2 lb)

Rugby union career
- Position: Tighthead Prop
Amateur team(s)
Years	Team	Apps	(Points)
2013-	Teqüe Rugby Club		
Senior career
Years	Team	Apps	(Points)
2015	Pampas XV	4	(0)
Provincial / State sides
Years	Team	Apps	(Points)
- Cuyo
Super Rugby
Years	Team	Apps	(Points)
2014	Highlanders	8	(0)
- Correct as of 18 August 2015
International career
Years	Team	Apps	(Points)
2011–12	Argentina U19	5	(0)
2012–13	Argentina U20	15	(0)
2013–	Argentina	11	(0)
- Correct as of 18 August 2015

Matías Díaz (born 16 March 1993 in Mendoza) is an Argentina rugby union player who plays mostly in the Tight head prop position. He currently plays with the New Zealand team Highlanders in Super Rugby.

He was called up by Rodolfo Ambrosio into the Argentina under-20 side for the 2012 IRB Junior World Championship, and kept his position for the 2013 IRB Junior World Championship.

Díaz made his debut for the senior side in 2013 against eventual runners-up Uruguay in the 2013 South American Rugby Championship "A". Despite only being capped three times (all from the two-tiered competition), Díaz was named in the 30-man squad for the 2013 Rugby Championship.

He was initially named in Argentina's squad for the 2015 Rugby World Cup but then was immediately replaced by Juan Pablo Orlandi after getting injured.
