= Coenie Oosthuizen =

South Africa international rugby union player

- Full name: Coenrad Victor Oosthuizen
- Born: 22 March 1989 (age 37) Potchefstroom, South Africa
- Height: 1.80 m (5 ft 11 in)
- Weight: 127 kg (280 lb; 20 st 0 lb)
- School: Grey College, Bloemfontein
- University: University of the Free State

Rugby union career
- Position: Loosehead prop
- Current team: Sale Sharks
Youth career
- 2005–2008: Free State Cheetahs
Amateur team(s)
Years	Team	Apps	(Points)
2008	UFS Shimlas	7	(5)
Senior career
Years	Team	Apps	(Points)
2008–2015	Free State Cheetahs	55	(55)
2010	Cheetahs XV	1	(0)
2010–2015	Cheetahs	74	(40)
2016–2019	Sharks	44	(10)
2018–2019	Sharks (Currie Cup)	11	(0)
2019–	Sale Sharks	93	(15)
- Correct as of 20 May 2023
International career
Years	Team	Apps	(Points)
2007	South Africa Schools		
2009	South Africa Under-20	5	(0)
2010	South Africa (tour)	1	(0)
2012–2017	South Africa (tests)	30	(20)
2013	Barbarians	1	(0)
2014	Springboks	1	(0)
2016	South Africa 'A'	2	(0)
- Correct as of 6 April 2018
Medal record
Men's Rugby union
Representing South Africa
Rugby World Cup
Bronze medal – third place	2015 England	Squad

Coenraad Victor Oosthuizen (born 22 March 1989), nicknamed 'Coenie' or 'Shrek', is a professional rugby union player for Sale Sharks in the English Premiership. He previously represented the Free State Cheetahs and Sharks in the Currie Cup, the Cheetahs and Sharks in Super Rugby and also was chosen for the Springboks squad in 2010, 2011 and 2012, making his test debut in the first test against England in Durban in 2012.

== Rugby career ==
Oosthuizen went to Laerskool Gustav Preller in Roodepoort for his primary education and attended Grey College in Bloemfontein.

Oosthuizen plays in the loose-head prop position, although he can play both sides of the scrum. He boasts surprising pace for a man of his colossal weight (127 kg). He ended the 2010 Currie Cup season as the Cheetahs top try scorer. Oosthuizen is known for his strong runs and work rate around the pitch but has often struggled in the scrum against the more technical scrummagers.

In 2010 Coenie scored a hat trick of tries for the Free State Cheetahs in a Currie Cup game against the neighbouring Griquas team. It is after a stand-out season for the Cheetahs during the 2010 Currie Cup domestic rugby season that Coenie was selected as part of the Springbok squad for the November 2010 tour of Europe.

Oosthuizen made his first test appearance on 9 June 2012 against England in Durban.

He signed for the Sharks on a four-year deal prior to the 2016 Super Rugby season.

On 13 May 2019, it was announced that he had signed a 3-year deal with Sale Sharks, and would join them after the conclusion of the 2019 Super Rugby season.

In 2016, Oosthuizen was included in a South Africa 'A' squad that played a two-match series against a touring England Saxons team. He came on as a replacement in their first match in Bloemfontein, but ended on the losing side as the visitors ran out 32–24 winners. He also played off the bench in the second match of the series, a 26–29 defeat to the Saxons in George.

=== International tries ===
As of 3 June 2022

Try	Opposing team	Location	Venue	Competition	Date	Result	Score
1	Australia	Brisbane, Australia	Suncorp Stadium	2013 Rugby Championship	7 September 2013	Win	12 – 38
2	Scotland	Edinburgh, Scotland	Murrayfield Stadium	2013 end-of-year rugby union internationals	17 November 2013	Win	0 – 28
3	Italy	Padua, Italy	Stadio Euganeo	2014 end-of-year rugby union internationals	22 November 2014	Win	6 – 22
4	France	Durban, South Africa	Kings Park Stadium	2017 France rugby union tour of South Africa	17 June 2017	Win	37 – 15

== Squads ==
Coenie Oosthuizen is/was involved in the following squads:

- 2014
  - Toyota Free State Cheetahs (Currie Cup)
  - Cheetahs (Super Rugby)
  - Springboks (2014 mid-year rugby union tests)
- 2013
  - Springboks (Outgoing Tours – British Isles & France)
  - Cheetahs (Super Rugby)
  - Springboks (2013 mid-year rugby union tests and 2013 Rugby Championship)
- 2012
  - Toyota Free State Cheetahs (Currie Cup)
  - Cheetahs (Super Rugby)
  - Springboks (one call-up against England)
- 2011
  - Toyota Free State Cheetahs (Currie Cup)
  - Cheetahs (Super Rugby)
  - Springboks (Tri-Nations (rugby union))
- 2010
  - Springboks (Outgoing Tours – British Isles)
  - Vodacom Free State Cheetahs (Currie Cup)
  - Cheetahs (Super Rugby)
- 2009
  - Vodacom Free State Cheetahs (Currie Cup)
  - South Africa National Under-20 (IRB Junior World Championship)
  - Cheetahs (Super Rugby)
- 2008
  - Free State U21 (ABSA Under 21 Competition)
  - Vodacom Free State Cheetahs (Currie Cup)
  - Vodacom Free State Cheetahs (Vodacom Cup)
  - Shimlas (FNB Varsity Cup)
- 2007
  - Free State U/19 (ABSA U/19 Competition)
  - SA Schools (SA Schools)
  - Free State (U18 Coca-Cola Craven Week)
- 2006
  - Free State (U18 Coca-Cola Craven Week)
- 2005
  - Free State (U16 Coca-Cola Grant Khomo Week)
- 2002
  - Golden Lions (U/13 Coca-Cola Craven Week)
