= Steve Luatua =

NZ & Samoa international rugby union player

Steven Luatua
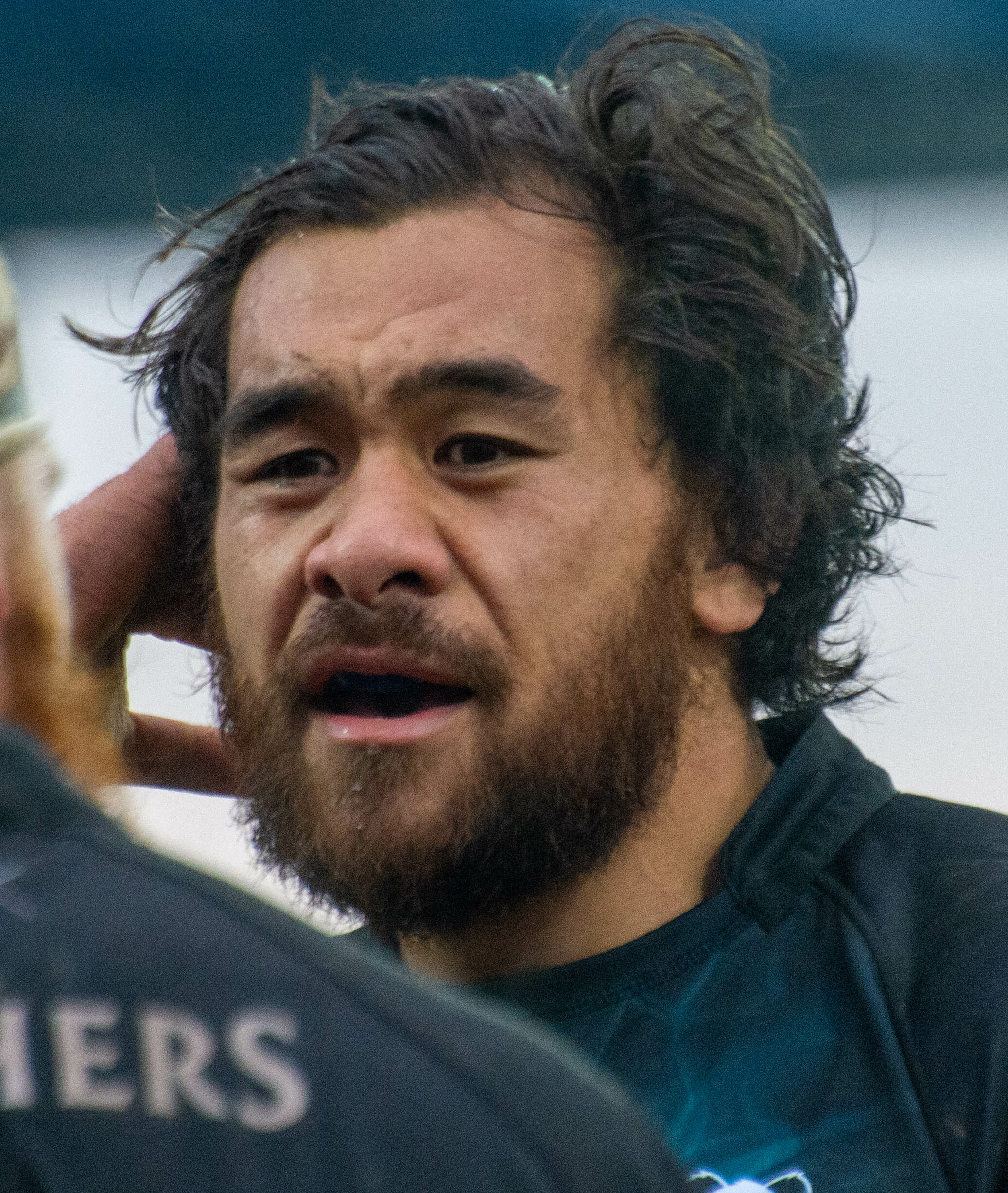
- Luatua representing Bristol Bears during the EPCR Challenge Cup
- Full name: Dolph Steven Luatua
- Born: 29 April 1991 (age 35) Auckland, New Zealand
- Height: 1.98 m (6 ft 6 in)
- Weight: 114 kg (251 lb; 17 st 13 lb)
- School: Mount Albert Grammar School

Rugby union career
- Position(s): Flanker, Number 8, Lock
- Current team: Bristol Bears
Senior career
Years	Team	Apps	(Points)
2010–2016	Auckland	30	(30)
2012–2017	Blues	75	(40)
2017–	Bristol Bears	114	(60)
- Correct as of 28 August 2023
International career
Years	Team	Apps	(Points)
2010	Samoa U20	5	(0)
2011	New Zealand U20	5	(10)
2013–2016	New Zealand	15	(10)
2023–	Samoa	3	(0)
- Correct as of 28 August 2023

Dolph Steven Luatua (born 29 April 1991) is a professional rugby union player who plays as a flanker for Premiership Rugby club Bristol Bears. Born in New Zealand, he represents Samoa at international level after qualifying on ancestry grounds.

== Early life ==
Luatua was a member of the New Zealand under 20 team which won the 2010 and 2011 IRB Junior World Championship.

== Club career ==
In February 2017, English Premiership side Bristol announced Luatua would be joining them for the 2017–18 season. Luatua served a 5-week suspension after being red carded for a high tackle on Tim Nanai-Williams from the Chiefs when Williams wasn't in possession of the ball. For the rest of the 2017 Super Rugby campaign Luatua was excellent, providing a game-winning offload to Sonny Bill Williams who subsequently offloaded to Ihaia West so that West could score against the British and Irish Lions. The Blues won 22–16. The following day however, Luatua was not selected for the All Blacks, meaning the Blues' 22–16 win against the Lions would be his last match at Eden Park.

== International career ==
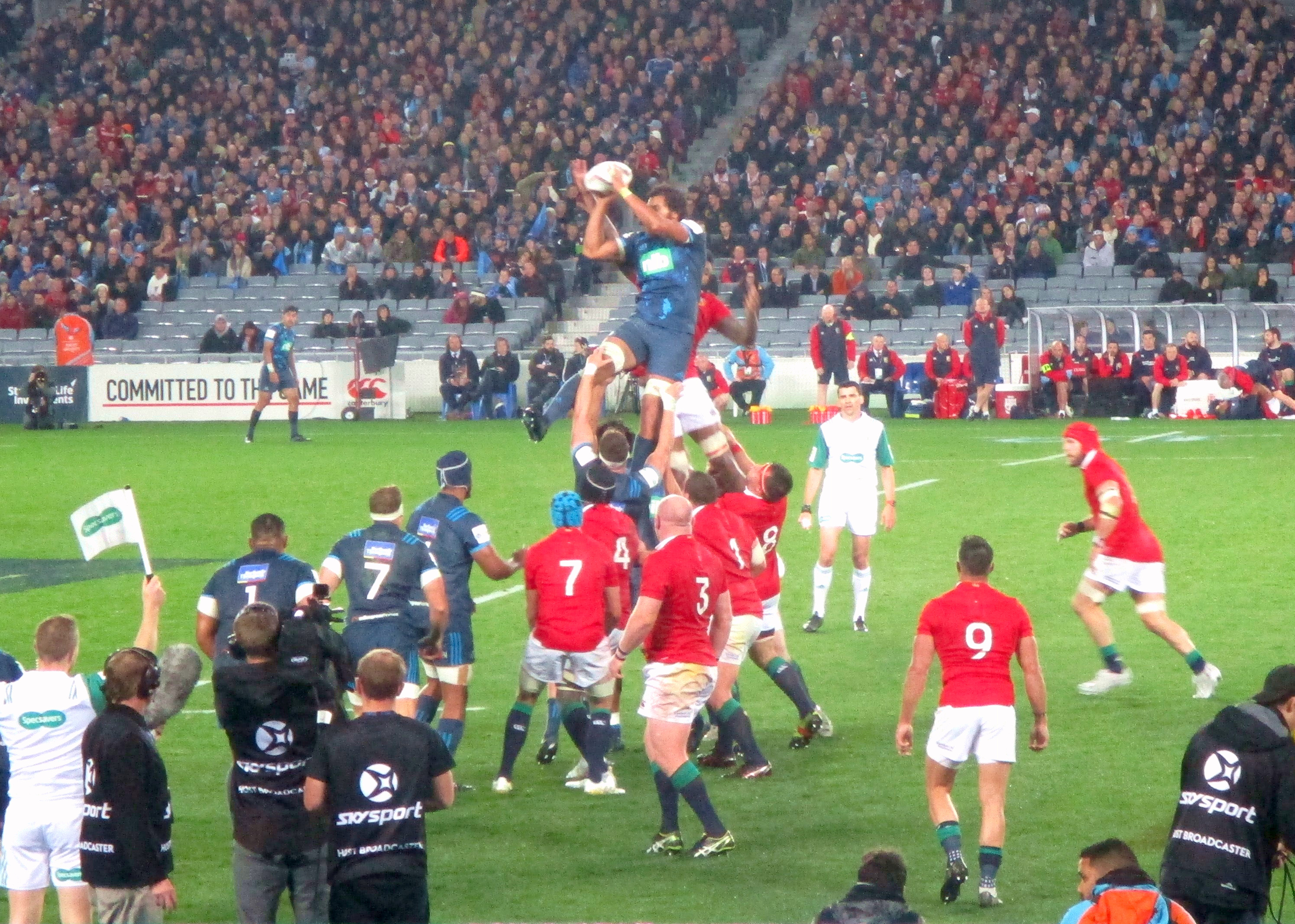
Steven Luatua wins a lineout as the Blues defeat the British and Irish Lions in 2017

After a strong start to the 2013 Super Rugby season, Luatua was named in the initial All Blacks wider training squad.

He made his All Blacks debut coming from the bench in the 24–9 victory versus France in New Plymouth on 22 June 2013.

He was selected for the All Blacks 2013 The Rugby Championship squad and played his first full test in the 47–29 win against Australia, in Sydney, on 17 August 2013.

On 23 August 2014, he scored his first international test try against Australia coming from the bench by a pass from the prop Charlie Faumuina leading to a win, 51–20.

After many struggles with keeping form and having injuries, Luatua was re-selected for New Zealand after two years' absence for the All Blacks' end-of-year tour in 2016. Luatua started as number 8 against Italy, scoring a try, New Zealand winning the match 68–10.

In 2022 Luatua switched allegiances and started playing for Samoa and was named in the Rugby World Cup 2023 squad.

== Personal life ==
Luatua is an avid New England Patriots fan. He covered the NFL playoffs in 2017 for Duke TV.
