= Scott Fardy =

Australian rugby union player (born 1984)

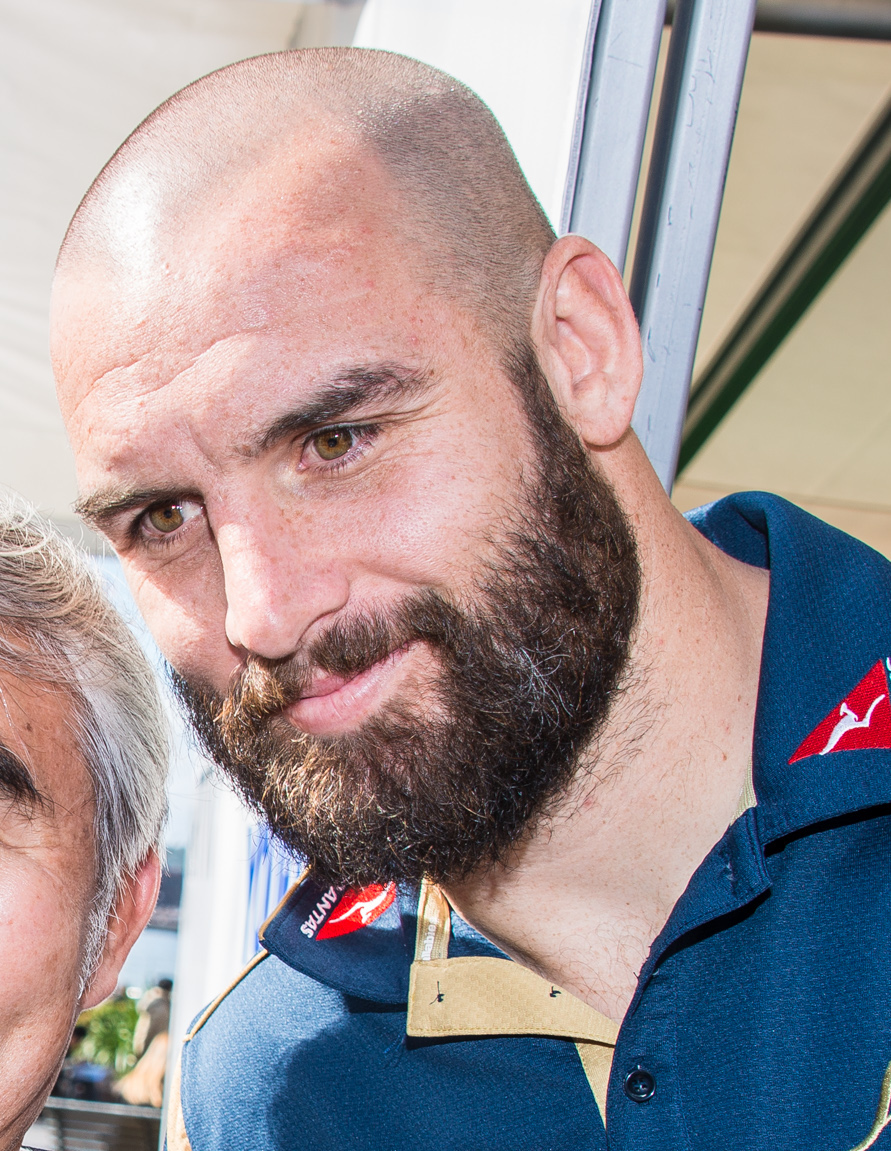
- Fardy in 2014
- Born: Scott Fardy; 5 July 1984 (age 42) Sydney, Australia
- Height: 198 cm (6 ft 6 in)
- Weight: 112 kg (17 st 9 lb)
- School: Barrenjoey High School, Pittwater High School
- University: Dublin City University

Rugby union career
- Position(s): Lock, Blindside Flanker
Senior career
Years	Team	Apps	(Points)
2009-2012	Kamaishi Seawaves	29	(75)
- Correct as of 10 April 2021
Provincial / State sides
Years	Team	Apps	(Points)
2007	Perth Spirit	4	(0)
2016	Sydney Rays	1	(0)
2017–2021	Leinster Rugby	78	(50)
- Correct as of 6 July 2026
Super Rugby
Years	Team	Apps	(Points)
2008	Western Force	0	(0)
2012–2017	Brumbies	97	(45)
- Correct as of 21 July 2017
International career
Years	Team	Apps	(Points)
2013–2016	Australia	39	(0)
- Correct as of 19 November 2016
Coaching career
- Years: Team
- 2023–present: Connacht Rugby (Defence Coach)

Scott Fardy (born 5 July 1984) is an Australian professional rugby union coach and former player. He last played for Leinster in the Pro14 & the European Rugby Champions Cup from 2019 to 2021 before retirement. His playing position was either lock or blindside flanker. He made his Brumbies debut in Week 1 of the 2012 Super Rugby season against the Western Force in Canberra. Prior to joining Brumbies, he played for Japanese Club Kamaishi Seawaves for 3 seasons from 2009. Fardy made his Wallabies debut in the 2013 Rugby Championship against the All Blacks in Sydney.

Fardy also played representative baseball until he was 16 years old, playing in the same team as future teammate Rocky Elsom. Fardy was professional coach with the Green Rockets side in Japan for the 2022 and 2023 seasons. On 17 April 2023, it was announced by Connacht Rugby that Fardy had signed on as a defence coach on a 2-year deal, beginning with the 2023/2024 season.

== The Great East Japan Earthquake ==
While playing in Japan, on March 11, 2011, Fardy experienced the Great East Japan Earthquake. Kamaishi, the town where his team Seawaves based, was hit by tsunami and suffered a tremendous damage. On top of that, fearing a possible influence of radiation caused by the severe accident on Fukushima Daiichi Nuclear Power Station, the Australian Embassy in Tokyo advised its nationals in Japan, including Fardy, to evacuate from the country. But Fardy refused to follow the advice and chose to remain with the team and help locals struggling to recover from the disasters. Fardy's commitment and dedication to the local community has been greatly appreciated, and on August 10, 2022, he was awarded Foreign Minister’s Commendations for FY 2022.

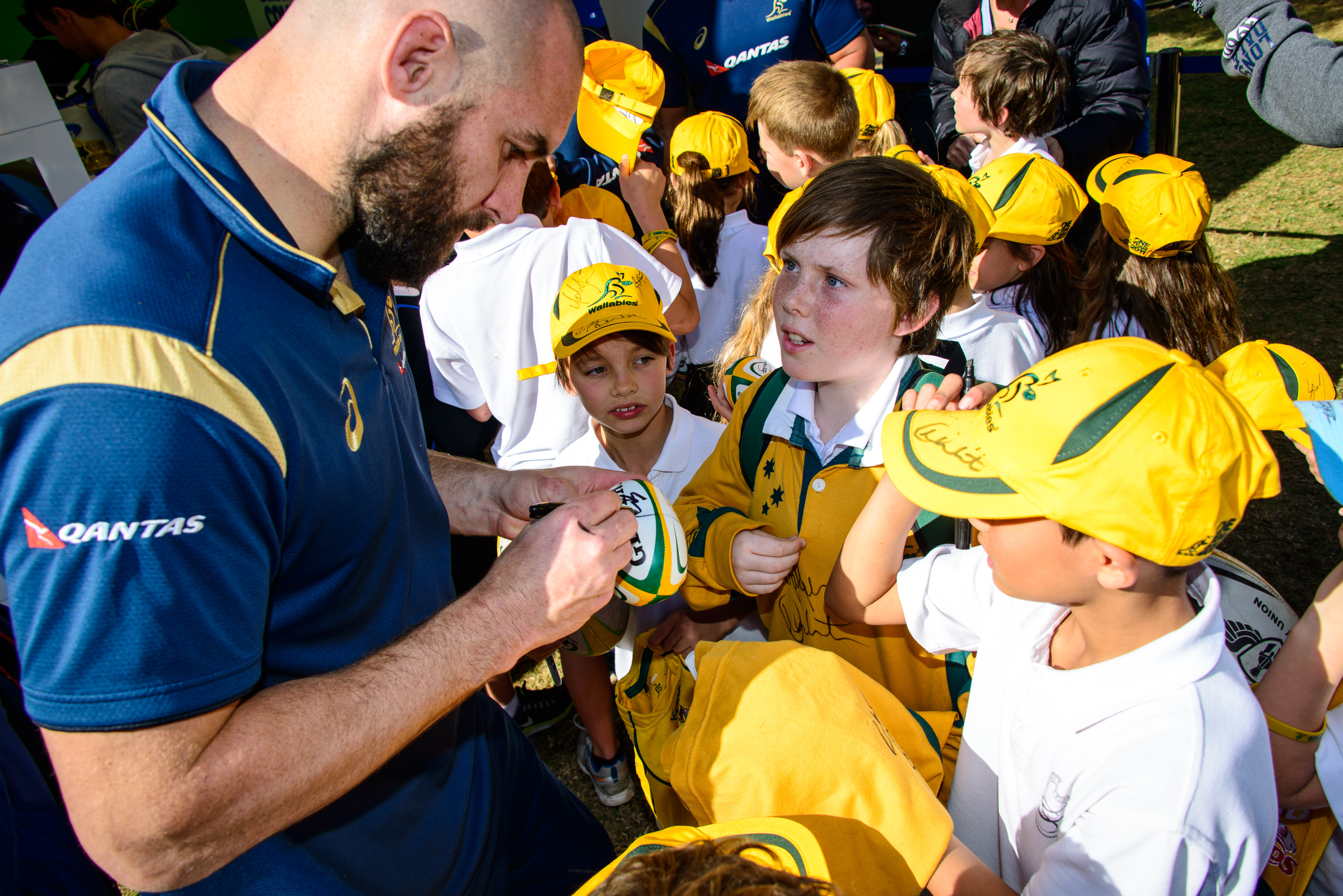
Wallaby Scott Fardy and fans in 2014

== Leinster Rugby ==
He joined the Irish province Leinster at the start of the 2017/18 season and achieved European Champions Cup and PRO14 winners' medals with the province that season. The following season, he played 22 games for the club, including playing in PRO14 final and winning another medal. Leinster lost to Saracens in the European Cup final in that season. He was given a contract extension for another season, and is currently playing in both PRO14 and European Champions Cup competitions. Fardy earned his third straight Pro14 dream team place when he was named to the 2019–20 Pro14 team. In April 2021, Fardy announced that he would retire from rugby at the end of the season.

== Super Rugby and Pro14 statistics ==
As of 28 March 2021

Season	Team	Games	Starts	Sub	Mins	Tries	Cons	Pens	Drops	Points	Yel	Red
2008	Force	0	0	0	0	0	0	0	0	0	0	0
2012	Brumbies	16	11	5	981	2	0	0	0	10	0	0
2013	Brumbies	14	12	2	984	1	0	0	0	5	0	0
2014	Brumbies	18	18	0	1440	2	0	0	0	10	2	0
2015	Brumbies	18	18	0	1392	0	0	0	0	0	2	0
2016	Brumbies	16	16	0	1226	4	0	0	0	20	0	0
2017	Brumbies	15	15	0	1200	0	0	0	0	0	1	0
2017/18	Leinster	22	19	3	1525	4	0	0	0	20	1	0
2018/19	Leinster	22	17	5	1417	5	0	0	0	25	1	0
2019/20	Leinster	17	14	3	1038	1	0	0	0	5	0	0
2020/21	Leinster	15	11	4	747	0	0	0	0	0	0	0
Total		173	151	22	10,751	19	0	0	0	95	6	0
