= Nahuel Lobo =

Argentine rugby union player (born 1991)

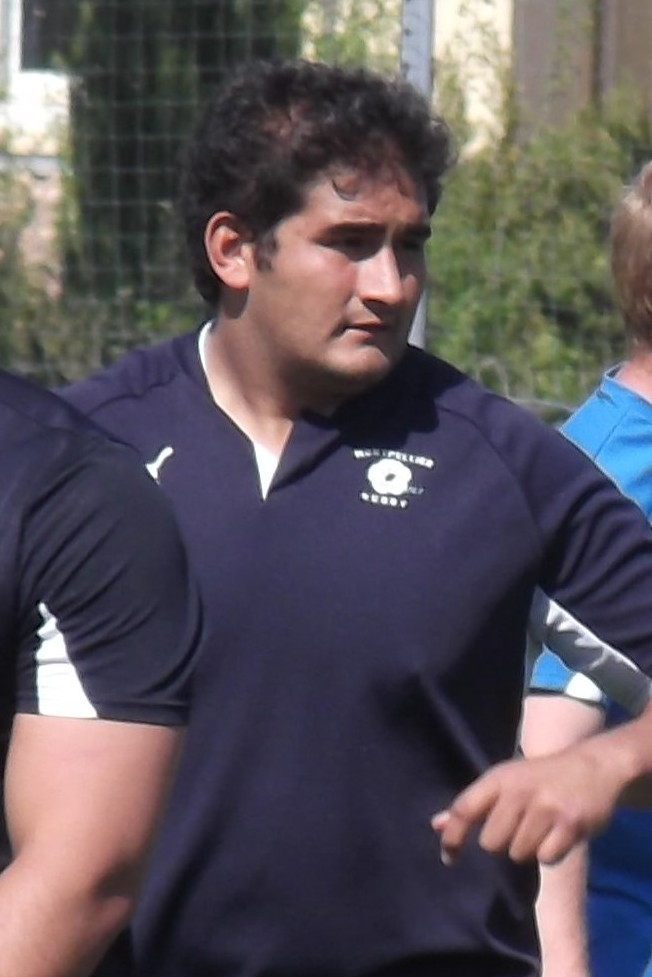
- Born: Nahuel Lobo; 27 August 1991 (age 35) Chajarí, Argentina
- Height: 1.80 m (5 ft 11 in)
- Weight: 116 kg (18 st 4 lb)

Rugby union career
- Position: Prop
Amateur team(s)
Years	Team	Apps	(Points)
- Estudiantes de Paraná
Senior career
Years	Team	Apps	(Points)
2012	Pampas XV	2	(0)
2012–13	Montpellier	9	(0)
2013–14	Newcastle Falcons	0	(0)
2014–	Montpellier	5	(0)
International career
Years	Team	Apps	(Points)
2011	Argentina U20	8	(0)
2012–	Argentina	10	(0)
- Correct as of 24 November 2013

Nahuel Lobo (born 27 August 1991) is an Argentine rugby union footballer. He currently plays for Montpellier in the Top 14. He also plays for the Argentina national team, Los Pumas. His usual position is Prop.

He made his international debut on 17 November 2012 in a 39–22 defeat against France in Lille.
