= Juan Pablo Orlandi =

Argentine rugby union footballer

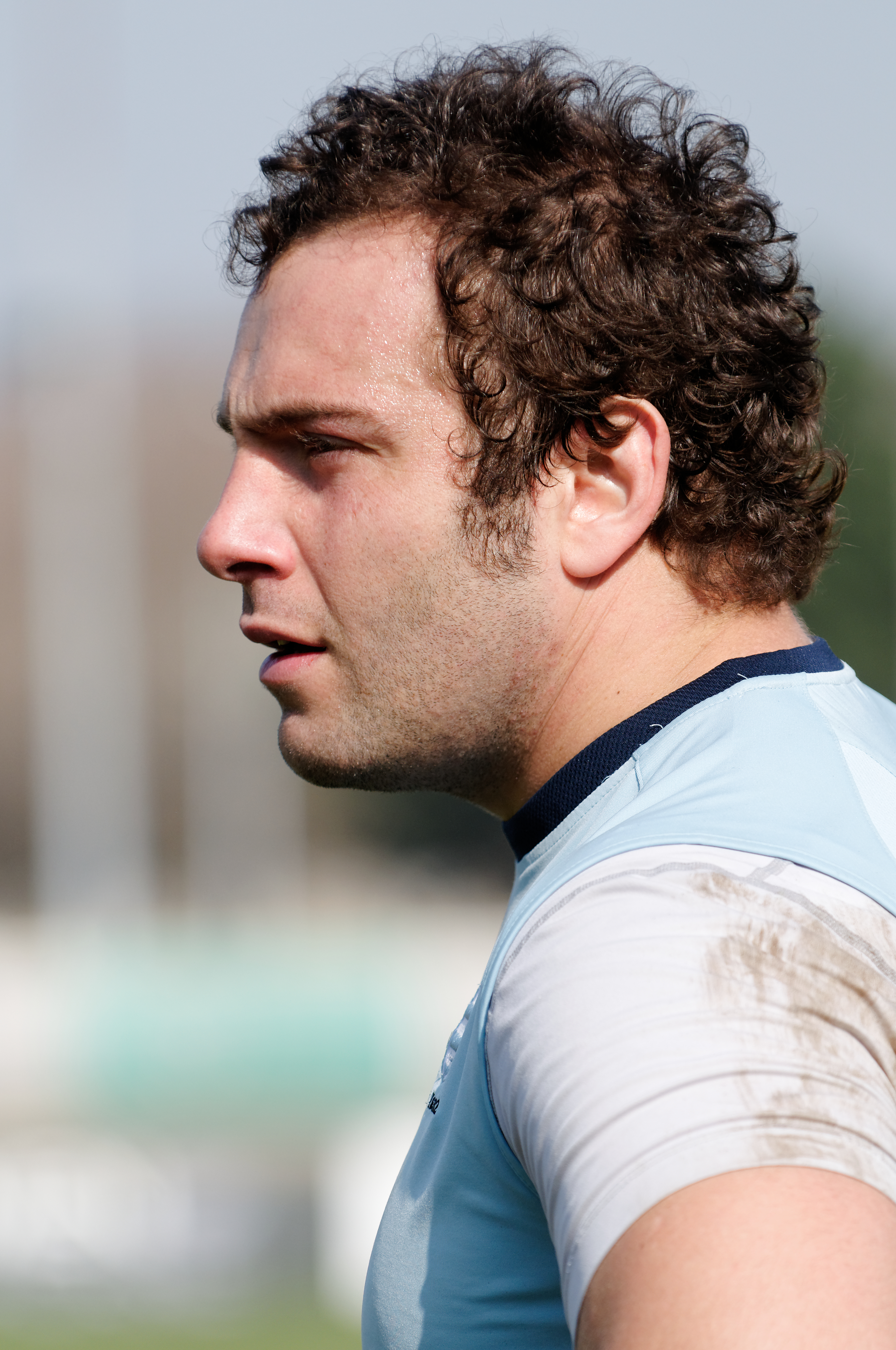
- Orlandi during the Racing Métro training session held at Antony on 13 March 2012
- Full name: Juan Pablo Orlandi
- Born: 20 June 1983 (age 43) Mendoza, Argentina
- Height: 1.93 m (6 ft 4 in)
- Weight: 124 kg (19 st 7 lb; 273 lb)

Rugby union career
- Position: Tighthead Prop
Amateur team(s)
Years	Team	Apps	(Points)
- Marista Rugby Club
Senior career
Years	Team	Apps	(Points)
2006–2009	Rovigo	45	(10)
2009–2013	Racing Metro	76	(10)
2013–2015	Bath Rugby	21	(0)
2015	Newcastle Falcons	8	(0)
2015	Pau	10	(0)
2017–2019	Bayonne	22	(0)
- Correct as of 15 April 2018
International career
Years	Team	Apps	(Points)
2008–10	Argentina Jaguars	3	(0)
2008–2015	Argentina	20	(5)
- Correct as of 30 October 2015

Juan Pablo Orlandi (born 20 June 1983) is an Argentine former rugby union footballer who played at prop.

== Career ==
He previously played for Racing Métro in France and Rovigo in Italy. Orlandi has also represented the Argentina national rugby union team. In February 2013, he signed for Bath Rugby for the 2013–14 season. However, on 5 January 2015, Orlandi signed with Newcastle Falcons with immediate effect from the 2014–15 season. On 6 Jan 2016 he was signed as a Medical Joker replacement to Pau in France.

He retired in the Aviron Bayonnais in 2019 to start a career as a rugby coach. He coached the Aviron Bayonnais sub-21 team for two years. After this, in 2022, he signed as a forwards coach in Stade Olympique Chambérien Rugby . His next steps were signing as forwards coach for the Romania national rugby union team in 2024, contributing to their qualification for the Rugby World Cup 2027. Following this achievement, he was subsequently appointed as scrum specialist by US Colomiers Rugby.

Orlandi made his international debut for Argentina on 8 November 2008 in a test match against France.

Orlandi was called up for Argentina's squad for the 2015 Rugby World Cup.
