= Heyneke Meyer =

South African rugby union coach

- Born: 6 October 1967 (age 59) Nelspruit, Transvaal Province, South Africa
- School: Bergvlam High School
- University: University of Pretoria

Rugby union career
- Position: Head Coach
Amateur team(s)
Years	Team	Apps	(Points)
1986–1987	Tukkies		
Coaching career
- Years: Team
- 1997: SWD Eagles (Asst. Coach)
- 1998–2000: SWD Eagles (Head Coach)
- 1999: Stormers (Forwards Coach)
- 1999: Emerging Springboks
- 1999–2001: South Africa (Forwards Coach)
- 2000: Bulls
- 2000–2001: Blue Bulls (Asst. Coach - Currie Cup)
- 2001: Blue Bulls (Head Coach - Vodacom Cup)
- 2002: Bulls
- 2002–2007: Blue Bulls (Head Coach - Currie Cup)
- 2003–2004: Blue Bulls (Head Coach - Vodacom Cup)
- 2005–2007: Bulls
- 2008–2009: Leicester Tigers
- 2012–2015: South Africa (Head Coach)
- 2017: Asia Pacific Dragons
- 2018–2019: Stade Français

Heyneke Meyer (born 6 October 1967) is a professional rugby union coach, best known for coaching the Springboks from 2012 until 2015. Prior to coaching the Springboks, he spent many years at the domestic level in South Africa before coaching Leicester Tigers in England. Following his stint with the Boks, he also coached Stade Français. On 8 July 2021 he was announced as the new Director of Rugby for the Houston Sabercats of MLR.

== Early years ==
Meyer attended Bergvlam High School in Nelspruit before studying sports psychology at the University of Pretoria. He obtained various degrees after high school life, including BA (Psychology, Geography and Human Movement Science), Hons BA (Geography).

== Career ==
=== Club ===
Meyer, who studied at University of Pretoria, played for the university's rugby team, the Tukkies. He took on a player-coaching role with the team, and upon graduating in 1988, he took on a full-time role with the team. He coached various High School and Under-21 teams in Pretoria, before joining the SWD Eagles in the Currie Cup in 1997. He first started as an assistant coach with the team under Phil Pretorius, before being given the reigns of head coach in 1998. In his debut year, he led the team to the semi-finals during the 1998 Vodacom Cup, losing to the Golden Lions 31–19. He also improved their positioning in the Currie Cup, finishing seventh after the regular season. In 1999, the Eagles failed to make the semi-finals in the Vodacom Cup, though made the semi-finals of the Currie cup, defeating South African powerhouses Sharks and Western Province along the way. In addition to this, Meyer was an assistant coach to Alan Solomons at the Stormers during the 1999 Super 12 season, in which the Stormers finished second on the table after the regular season, before being beaten 33–18 in the semi-final by the Otago Highlanders. Haven been appointed head coach of the Bulls for the 2000 Super 12 season, taking over from Eugene van Wyk, Meyer stood down from his post with the Eagles.

While at the Bulls, the side finish second to last, with only 1 win to their name, and at the Blue Bulls, acting as Assistant coach due to his Springboks commitments, 2000 was the worst season ever for the team, having failed to qualify for the top eight of the Currie Cup. In 2001, he replaced Eugene van Wyk, at the Blue Bulls, while also being dismissed from his post with the Bulls in the Super 12 due to poor results in 2000. He led the Blue Bulls to their first Vodacom Cup title, beating Boland Cavaliers 42–24 in the final. He didn't take part in the Blue Bulls Currie Cup campaign that year due to his Springboks commitments, though returned to Pretoria in 2002 as full-time coach with the Bulls at Super 12 and Currie Cup. The Bulls finished last during the 2002 Super 12 season with no wins, and like in 2000, with dismissed from his post. He remained with the Blue Bulls which he reach two consecutive Vodacom Cup semi-finals in 2003 and 2004, and claimed three consecutive Currie Cup titles in 2002, 2003 and 2004.

He returned to the Bulls in 2005 where the Bulls finished third after the regular season, only to lose to the New South Wales Waratahs 23–13 in the semi-final. In 2006 they reached the semi-final again but lost to the Crusaders 35–15. It wasn't until 2007 when the Bulls made it to the final, defeating South African rivals the Sharks 20–19 in Durban. Meyer's final actions in Pretoria was during the 2007 Currie Cup Premier Division, where after the regular season, the Blue Bull finished 4th, but lost to the Free State Cheetahs 11–6 in the semi-final.

On 30 June 2008, he was named head coach of Leicester Tigers in England. His stint in England was short, having won 9 matches with his new team, he took compassionate leave from his Tigers post to attend to family matters in South Africa, only to fully stand down from his post on 28 January 2009.

He later took up an executive role with the Blue Bulls in Pretoria.

=== International ===
Meyer made his first international appearance as a coach in 1999 when he coached the Emerging Springboks. He later became forwards coach for the Springboks ahead of the 1999 Rugby World Cup. South Africa finished top of their group, and made it to the semi-final after beating England 44–21. Though in the semi-final, South Africa lost to Australia after extra time, 27–21. He remained with the Springboks between his club commitments, until 2001, when he returned to Pretoria as a full-time coach with the Bulls and Blue Bulls.

==== Head coach of South Africa ====
In January 2012, Heyneke Meyer was named head coach of South Africa on a 4-year term until after the 2015 Rugby World Cup. His first match in charge was 1 of three tests against England during the South African tour. He won the first two tests 22–17 and 36–27 respectively, but drew the final test 14–all. He later led South Africa to third in the 2012 Rugby Championship, opening with a win at Newlands and a draw in Buenos Aires against newcomers.Argentina. South Africa pushed the Wallabies in Perth, but lost 26–19, before going down 21–11 to the All Blacks. Meyer gained revenge over Australia on 29 September, beating them 31–8 in Pretoria, though lost to New Zealand 32–16 in Johannesburg the following week. Their victory over Australia saw the Springboks climb to second in the IRB World Rankings for the first time since 2010. During the Springboks 2012 End-of-year tour, Meyer led South Africa to their first clean sweep since 2008, defeating Ireland 16–12, Scotland 21–10 and England 16–15.

In 2013, South Africa claimed 6 consecutive victories, which included a first ever victory over Australia at Suncorp Stadium in Brisbane. Then on 5 October, Meyer led South Africa into the 2013 Rugby Championship decider against the All Blacks, though ultimately lost 38–27. South Africa later went on to record another clean sweep on their End-of-year tour, their first back to back clean sweeps since their 1996 and 1997 End-of-year tour clean sweeps.

In 2014, having claimed a 2–0 test series victory over Wales, South Africa went on to beat the All Blacks for the first time since 2011, winning 27–25 at Ellis Park Stadium. Though because of their 24–23 loss to Australia in round 3, South Africa finished second for the second consecutive year. While on their 2014 end-of-year tour, South Africa lost 2 matches, Ireland 29–15 and Wales 12–6, the Welsh loss being their first since 1999.

In 2015, Meyer came under pressure having lost all 2015 Rugby Championship matches, including a first ever loss to Argentina 37–25, at home. He was called a "racist" in the media due to the lack of "black" players being selected, which even led to the team being taken to court, with their position at the 2015 Rugby World Cup under threat. Meyer got his first win in 2015, and in 4 matches, against Argentina in a Rugby World Cup warm-up match in Buenos Aires, winning 26–12.

In their first game of the 2015 Rugby World Cup, Meyer coached the Springboks in their first ever game against Japan, then ranked 13th in the World Rugby Rankings. The Brave Blossoms convincingly outplayed the Springboks, beating them 34–32 with a try in the corner, deep into injury time. Heyneke Meyer, often criticized for favouring "experience over talent", made a public apology to the South African nation for this loss, admitting that the team's performance was "unacceptable". Despite that opening loss, South Africa went on to finish third, winning all their remaining matches in their pool; Samoa 46–6, Scotland 34–16 and the United States 64–0, to secure top place in their pool. They beat Wales 23–19 in the quarter-finals, however lost to New Zealand 20–18 in the semi-final. They faced Argentina in the Bronze Final, securing a 24–13 victory to claim the bronze medal.

Meyer initially stated that he wished to remain as coach, but a number of provincial unions stated they would oppose handing Meyer a contract extension – with the team's style of play and lack of transformation being cited as reasons for this opposition – and Meyer subsequently resigned from his post as Springbok coach on 3 December 2015.

==== International matches as head coach ====
Note: World Rankings Column shows the World Ranking South Africa was placed at on the following Monday after each of their matches

Matches (2012–2015)
Matches	Date	Opposition	Venue	Score (SA–Opponent)	Competition	Captain	World Ranking
2012
1	9 June	England	Kings Park Stadium, Durban	22–17	English test series	Jean de Villiers	3rd
2	16 June	England	Ellis Park, Johannesburg	36–27	English test series	Jean de Villiers	3rd
3	23 June	England	Nelson Mandela Bay Stadium, Port Elizabeth	14–14	English test series	Jean de Villiers	3rd
4	18 August	Argentina	Newlands Stadium, Cape Town	27–6	Rugby Championship	Jean de Villiers	3rd
5	25 August	Argentina	Estadio Malvinas Argentinas, Mendoza	16–16	Rugby Championship	Jean de Villiers	3rd
6	8 September	Australia	Subiaco Oval, Perth	19–26	Rugby Championship	Jean de Villiers	3rd
7	15 September	New Zealand	Forsyth Barr Stadium, Dunedin	11–21	Rugby Championship	Jean de Villiers	3rd
8	29 September	Australia	Loftus Versfeld Stadium, Pretoria	31–8	Rugby Championship	Jean de Villiers	2nd
9	6 October	New Zealand	FNB Stadium, Johannesburg	16–32	Rugby Championship	Jean de Villiers	3rd
10	10 November	Ireland	Aviva Stadium, Dublin	16–12	End-of-year tour	Jean de Villiers	2nd
11	17 November	Scotland	Murrayfield, Edinburgh	21–10	End-of-year tour	Jean de Villiers	2nd
12	24 November	England	Twickenham, London	16–15	End-of-year tour	Jean de Villiers	2nd
2013
13	8 June	Italy	Kings Park Stadium, Durban	44–10	Quadrangular tournament	Jean de Villiers	2nd
14	15 June	Scotland	Mbombela Stadium, Nelspruit	30–17	Quadrangular tournament	Jean de Villiers	2nd
15	22 June	Samoa	Loftus Versfeld Stadium, Pretoria	56–23	Quadrangular tournament	Jean de Villiers	2nd
16	17 August	Argentina	FNB Stadium, Johannesburg	73–13	Rugby Championship	Jean de Villiers	2nd
17	24 August	Argentina	Estadio Malvinas Argentinas, Mendoza	22–17	Rugby Championship	Jean de Villiers	2nd
18	7 September	Australia	Lang Park, Brisbane	38–12	Rugby Championship	Jean de Villiers	2nd
19	14 September	New Zealand	Eden Park, Auckland	15–29	Rugby Championship	Jean de Villiers	2nd
20	28 September	Australia	Newlands Stadium, Cape Town	28–8	Rugby Championship	Jean de Villiers	2nd
21	5 October	New Zealand	Ellis Park, Johannesburg	27–38	Rugby Championship	Jean de Villiers	2nd
22	9 November	Wales	Millennium Stadium, Cardiff	24–15	End-of-year tour	Jean de Villiers	2nd
23	17 November	Scotland	Murrayfield, Edinburgh	28–0	End-of-year tour	Jean de Villiers	2nd
24	23 November	France	Stade de France, Paris	19–10	End-of-year tour	Jean de Villiers	2nd
2014
25	14 June	Wales	Kings Park Stadium, Durban	38–16	Welsh test series	Victor Matfield	2nd
26	21 June	Wales	Mbombela Stadium, Nelspruit	31–30	Welsh test series	Victor Matfield	2nd
27	28 June	Scotland	Nelson Mandela Bay Stadium, Port Elizabeth	55–6	2014 mid-year test	Victor Matfield	2nd
28	16 August	Argentina	Loftus Versfeld Stadium, Pretoria	13–6	Rugby Championship	Jean de Villiers	2nd
29	23 August	Argentina	Estadio Padre Ernesto Martearena, Salta	33–31	Rugby Championship	Jean de Villiers	2nd
30	6 September	Australia	Subiaco Oval, Perth	23–24	Rugby Championship	Jean de Villiers	2nd
31	13 September	New Zealand	Westpac Stadium, Wellington	10–14	Rugby Championship	Jean de Villiers	2nd
32	27 September	Australia	Newlands Stadium, Cape Town	28–10	Rugby Championship	Jean de Villiers	2nd
33	4 October	New Zealand	Ellis Park Stadium, Johannesburg	27–25	Rugby Championship	Jean de Villiers	2nd
34	8 November	Ireland	Aviva Stadium, Dublin	15–29	End-of-year tour	Jean de Villiers	2nd
35	15 November	England	Twickenham, London	31–28	End-of-year tour	Jean de Villiers	2nd
36	22 November	Italy	Stadio Euganeo, Padua	22–6	End-of-year tour	Jean de Villiers	2nd
37	29 November	Wales	Millennium Stadium, Cardiff	6–12	End-of-year tour	Jean de Villiers	2nd
2015
38	18 July	Australia	Lang Park, Brisbane	20–24	Rugby Championship	Victor Matfield	2nd
39	25 July	New Zealand	Ellis Park, Johannesburg	20–27	Rugby Championship	Schalk Burger	2nd
40	8 August	Argentina	Kings Park Stadium, Durban	25–37	Rugby Championship	Jean de Villiers	5th
41	15 August	Argentina	José Amalfitani Stadium, Buenos Aires	26–12	2015 RWC Warm-up	Victor Matfield	5th
42	19 September	Japan	Brighton Community Stadium, Brighton, England	32–34	2015 Rugby World Cup	Jean de Villiers	6th
43	26 September	Samoa	Villa Park, Birmingham, England	46–6	2015 Rugby World Cup	Fourie du Preez	5th
44	3 October	Scotland	St. James' Park, Newcastle, England	34–16	2015 Rugby World Cup	Fourie du Preez	4th
45	7 October	United States	Olympic Stadium, London, England	64–0	2015 Rugby World Cup	Fourie du Preez	5th
46	17 October	Wales	Twickenham Stadium, London, England	23–19	2015 Rugby World Cup	Fourie du Preez	3rd
47	24 October	New Zealand	Twickenham Stadium, London, England	18–20	2015 Rugby World Cup	Fourie du Preez	3rd
48	30 October	Argentina	Olympic Stadium, London, England	24–13	2015 Rugby World Cup	Victor Matfield	3rd

==== Record by Country ====
Opponent	Played	Won	Drew	Lost	Win ratio (%)	For	Against
Argentina	9	7	1	1	78	259	151
Australia	7	4	0	3	57	167	88
England	5	4	1	0	80	119	101
France	1	1	0	0	100	19	10
Ireland	2	1	0	1	50	31	41
Italy	2	2	0	0	100	66	16
Japan	1	0	0	1	0	32	34
New Zealand	8	1	0	7	13	124	179
Samoa	2	2	0	0	100	102	29
Scotland	5	5	0	0	100	168	49
United States	1	1	0	0	100	64	0
Wales	5	4	0	1	80	116	80
TOTAL	48	32	2	14	67	1313	841

==== Honours ====
- Rugby World Cup / Webb Ellis Cup
  - Third: 2015
- The Rugby Championship
  - Runners-up: 2013, 2014
- Mandela Challenge Plate
  - Winners: 2013, 2014
- Prince William Cup
  - Winners: 2013, June 2014
- South African quadrangular tournament
  - Winners: 2013

=== Other honours ===
South Africa (as assistant coach)

- Rugby World Cup / Webb Ellis Cup
  - Third: 1999

Bulls

- Super 14
  - Winners: 2007

Blue Bulls

- Currie Cup
  - Winners: 2002, 2003, 2004, 2006 (shared with Free State Cheetahs)
  - Runners-up: 2005
- Vodacom Cup
  - Winners: 2001
  - Runners-up: 2003, 2004

Sporting positions
Preceded by (South Africa) Peter de Villiers	South Africa National Rugby Union Coach; 2012–2015	Succeeded by (South Africa) Allister Coetzee
