= Charlie Faumuina =

New Zealand rugby union player

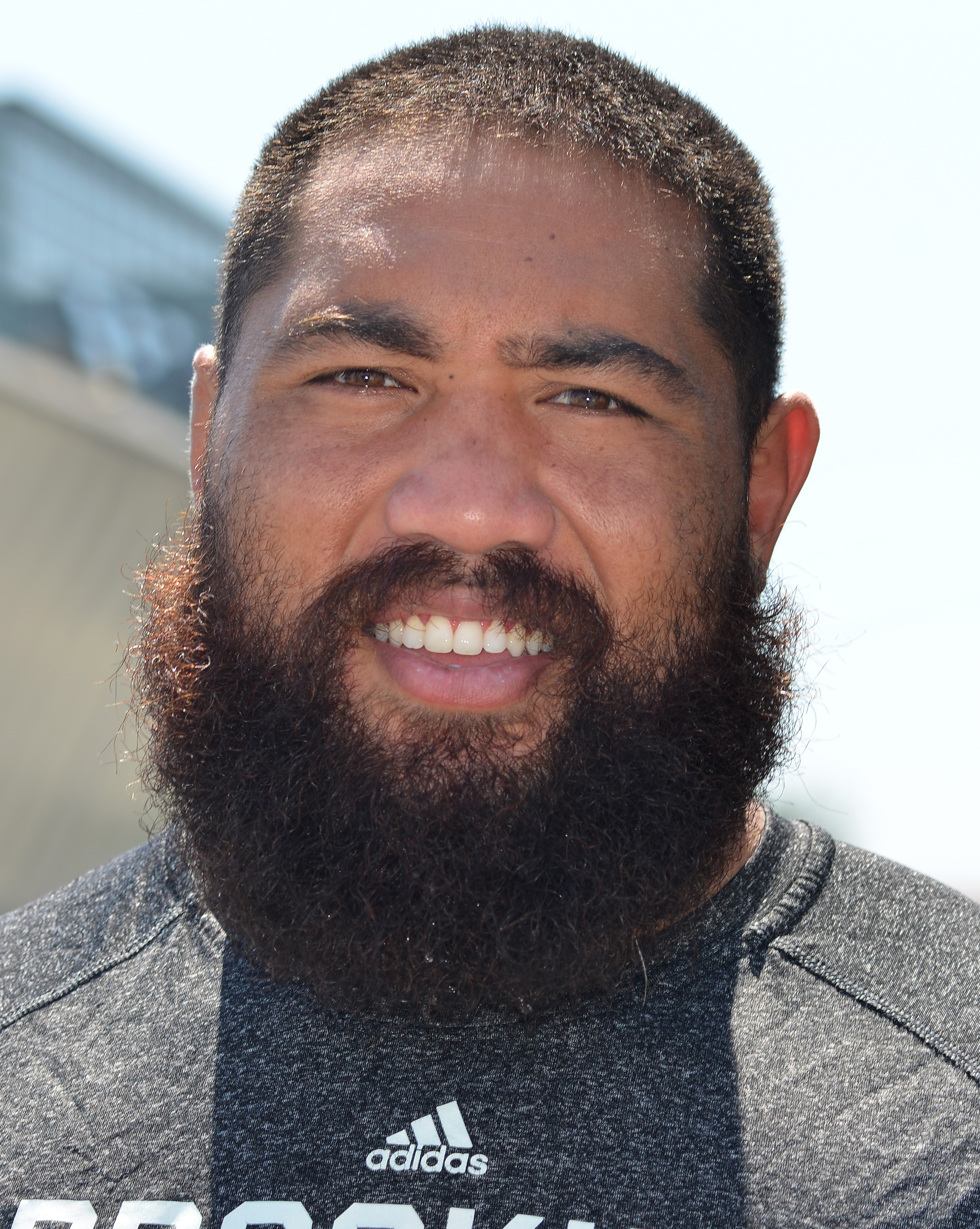
- Faumuina representing Toulouse during the Top 14
- Full name: Charles Chris Faumuina
- Born: 24 December 1986 (age 39) Auckland, New Zealand
- Height: 1.84 m (6 ft 0 in)
- Weight: 127 kg (280 lb; 20 st 0 lb)
- School: Papatoetoe High School

Rugby union career
- Position: Lock
- Current team: Toulouse
Senior career
Years	Team	Apps	(Points)
2007–2016	Auckland	50	(10)
2009–2017	Blues	99	(35)
2017−2023	Toulouse	129	(5)
- Correct as of 28 August 2023
International career
Years	Team	Apps	(Points)
2007	New Zealand U21	1	(0)
2012–2017	New Zealand	50	(20)
2023–24	Samoa	4	(0)
- Correct as of 28 August 2023

Charles Chris Faumuina (born 24 December 1986) is a retired professional rugby union player who played as a prop for Top 14 club Toulouse. Born in New Zealand, he represented New Zealand and Samoa at international level. He qualified to play for Samoa on ancestry grounds.

Following his retirement from international rugby, Faumuina played for the Classic All Blacks against the Classic Taniwha in Whangārei on 15 September 2024.

== Club career ==
Faumuina was a late recruit to rugby union, and played only rugby league until selected for the Papatoetoe High School 1st XV rugby team. His progress in rugby union was rapid and in 2007 he was selected to make his first-class rugby debut for the New Zealand Colts against Canada. The same year he made his debut for Auckland as a substitute against the Counties Manukau Steelers in the Air New Zealand Cup. On 7 March 2009, Faumuina made his Super Rugby debut against the Sharks when international prop John Afoa was ruled out through injury.

In 2011, due to extended injury layoff to Tony Woodcock, Faumuina started the majority of games for the Blues in a successful season.

In 2012, Faumuina played 10 of the Blues first 11 games in the Super Rugby season and missed only the game against the Chiefs due to injury.

Blues head coach at the time Pat Lam believed Faumuina, despite his size, has a dancer's agility. "He's a big man but his footwork is unbelievable, he's got footwork like a ballerina and I think it's a massive asset," said Lam.

On 28 October 2016, it was announced Faumuina would join top French club Toulouse in the Top 14 for the 2017–18 season.

== International career ==
=== New Zealand ===
On 8 September 2012, he made his debut for the All Blacks as a substitute in the 73rd minute in a test against Argentina.

On 15 September 2014, he scored his first international try for the All Blacks in a 24–21 victory against England.

Faumuina was selected for the 2015 Rugby World Cup's 31-man All Black squad and played in many games including the knockout stages, where the squad made history as the first to retain their World Cup title, and the first to win three tournaments.

=== Samoa ===
Having not played international rugby for 3 years he became eligible to play for Manu Samoa. It was announced Faumuina had been selected as a substitute for the game against Japan being played at the Sapporo Stadium on 22 July 2023. He came on as a substitute in the 52nd minute of the game, winning his first cap for Manu Samoa. He then made the cut and was selected for the Manu Samoa Rugby World Cup 2023 squad to be played in France.
