= 2014 Rugby Championship =

- Date: 16 August 2014 – 4 October 2014
- Countries: Argentina; Australia; New Zealand; South Africa

Final positions
- Champions: New Zealand (13th title)
- Bledisloe Cup: New Zealand
- Freedom Cup: New Zealand
- Mandela Challenge Plate: South Africa
- Puma Trophy: Australia

Tournament statistics
- Matches played: 12
- Tries scored: 50 (4.17 per match)
- Attendance: 430,582 (35,882 per match)
- Top scorer(s): (Argentina) Nicolás Sánchez (52)
- Most tries: (New Zealand) Julian Savea (4)

The 2014 Rugby Championship was the third edition of the expanded annual southern hemisphere Rugby Championship consisting of Argentina, Australia, South Africa and New Zealand. The tournament was won by New Zealand, with South Africa second, Australia third, and Argentina last.

The Championship began on 16 August with Australia hosting the defending champions, New Zealand, at the Stadium Australia in Sydney and South Africa hosting Argentina at Loftus Versfeld Stadium in Pretoria. The tournament continued for seven weeks, which included two byes, and concluded on 5 October with South Africa versus New Zealand at Ellis Park Stadium in Johannesburg and Argentina versus Australia at Estadio Malvinas Argentinas in Mendoza.

On 27 September, New Zealand clinched their third consecutive Championship after a bonus-point 34–13 win against Argentina in La Plata. The 2014 Rugby Championship was the first in which New Zealand failed to win all their matches – they drew with Australia in Week 1 and lost to South Africa in Week 6. It also saw the first Championship-match win for Argentina who defeated Australia 21–17 in the last match of the tournament.

== Format and standings ==
The format for the 2014 tournament was the same as that for the 2012 and 2013 editions. Each side played the other once at home, and once away; giving a total of six matches each, and twelve in total. A win earns a team four points, a draw two points, and a loss no points. A bonus point can be earned one of two ways: by scoring four tries or more in a match, or by losing within seven points. The competition winner is the side with the most points at the end of the tournament, however if two sides finish equal on points the side with the most wins is placed higher.

Tournament standings
Place	Nation	Games				Points			Try Bonus	Losing Bonus	Table points
Place	Nation	Played	Won	Drawn	Lost	For	Against	Diff	Try Bonus	Losing Bonus	Table points
1	New Zealand	6	4	1	1	164	91	+73	3	1	22
2	South Africa	6	4	0	2	134	110	+24	1	2	19
3	Australia	6	2	1	3	115	160	−45	0	1	11
4	Argentina	6	1	0	5	105	157	−52	0	3	7

== Summary ==
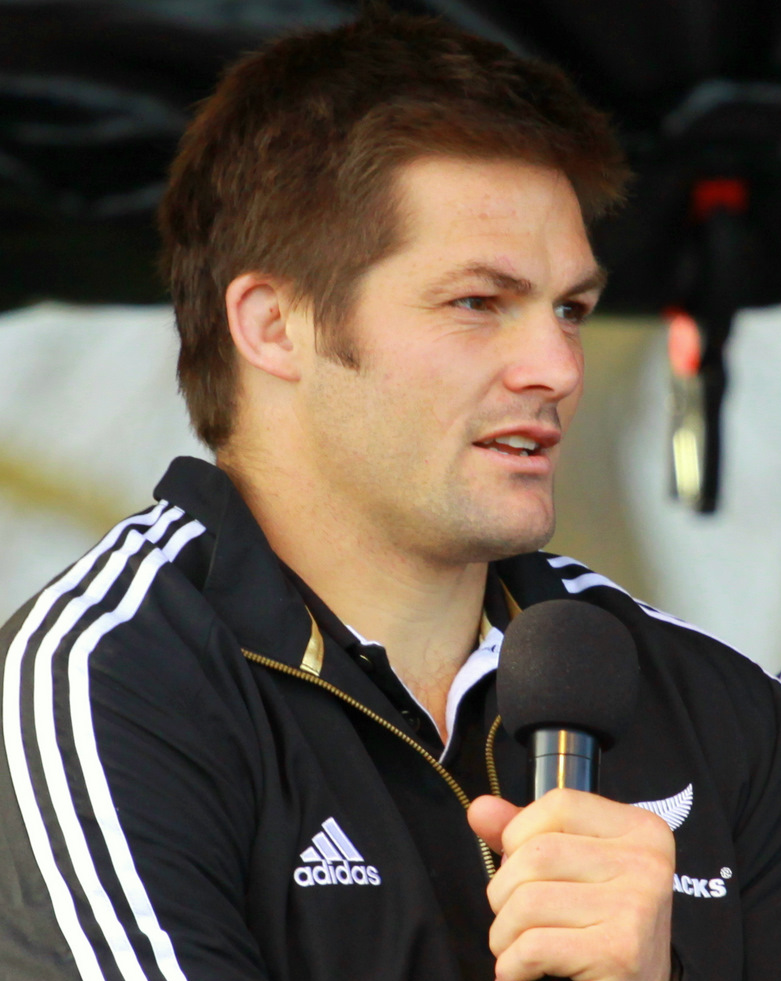
Richie McCaw made a record 134th appearance for New Zealand when he faced South Africa on 4 October 2014, overtaking the New Zealand record held by Colin Meads.

The first match of the championship was between New Zealand (also known as the All Blacks) and Australia (the Wallabies) in Sydney, Australia. The fixture doubled as a Bledisloe Cup match, and ended as a 12–12 draw. The All Blacks started stronger, and led 9–3 at half time, but Australia were much better in the second half. New Zealand had two players temporarily sent-off after being awarded yellow cards, but Australia were unable to capitalize on that advantage during their late dominance. All points were scored from penalties – four from each side. The draw ended a 17-match winning streak by the All Blacks. The following week both side met in their second Bledisloe Cup match of the Championship (the third is played following the tournament), but this time at Eden Park in New Zealand. The match was comfortably won by New Zealand 51–20, whose scored six tries to Australia's two. The All Blacks were regarded as the more physical of the two teams, and scored two tries from mauls. The win meant that New Zealand retained the Bledisloe Cup (Australia needed to win the three-match series to regain the cup).

The second match of the tournament was between South Africa (the Springboks) and Argentina (the Pumas) and played at Loftus Versfeld Stadium in Pretoria, South Africa. South Africa won 13–6 and scored the only try of the match, which was played in wet and raining conditions. The following week the two teams met again, this time at Estadio Padre Ernesto Martearena in Salta, Argentina. The Springboks won again, but were considered lucky to get the 31–33 victory. At one stage Argentina were winning by 12 points, and were leading with five minutes remaining, but Springbok Morné Steyn kicked a penalty in the 76th minute to give South Africa the lead and the win.

In weeks three and four, Argentina and South Africa both travelled to Australasia for two away matches. Argentina played the All Blacks in Napier where they lost 28–9, before facing Australia on the Gold Coast where they lost 32–25. The Pumas loss to the All Blacks was played in wet conditions, with New Zealand scoring four tries, and Argentina three penalties. Argentina's loss to Australia was much closer than their defeat in New Zealand. Despite leading by 16 points after 60 minutes, Australia conceded twelve points in the final quarter. Argentina trailed by seven points, the value of a converted try, when they had a scrum deep within Wallabies' territory, but Australia were awarded a free-kick after the Pumas' scrum-half fed the ball too early and the game ended. In the third week the Springboks played Australia in Perth, where the Wallabies won 24–23. The Wallbies had trailed 23–14, but scored ten unanswered points after Springbok wing Bryan Habana, who was playing in his 100th test match, was yellow carded for a high tackle. The following week South Africa played the All Blacks in Wellington. The match was won 14–10 by New Zealand, but only after they resisted repeated South African attacks on their try-line late in the game. The win was the 36th consecutive victory for the All Blacks in New Zealand – a record stretching back to 2009.

The last two weekends of matches were played in South Africa and Argentina. First up the Wallabies faced the Springboks in Cape Town, where South Africa won 28–10. The victory came after a ten-minute period at the end of the match where the Springboks scored three-tries. The same weekend Argentina faced the All Blacks in La Plata. For the New Zealanders the match was overshadowed by the omission of Aaron Cruden, who had missed the flight to Argentina, and was subsequently dropped from the squad for the last two weeks of the Championship. The All Blacks won 34–13, and with the bonus-point win took an unassailable lead in the Championship – giving them their third Rugby Championship, and 13th overall since the inception of the Tri-Nations Championship in 1996.

Despite New Zealand having secured the Championship title a week earlier, the final week of matches proved historic. The first match was the Springboks hosting the All Blacks at Ellis Park Stadium in Johannesburg. All Blacks' captain Richie McCaw played his 134th match for the side, surpassing the national record held by Colin Meads. However the New Zealanders 22-match unbeaten run (going back to December 2012) was ended after a 55 metres (180 ft) penalty kicked by South African Patrick Lambie in the 78th minute gave his side a 27–25 win. The last match of the tournament was between Argentina and Australia at Mendoza. The test was won 21–17 by the Pumas – their first win in the Rugby Championship since joining the competition in 2012. Australia led 14–0 within the first 15 minutes after scoring two early tries, however Argentina slowly accumulated points to overhaul their opponents.

== Sponsorship ==
The 2014 Rugby Championship was also known, for sponsorship reasons, as The Castle Lager Rugby Championship in South Africa, The Investec Rugby Championship in New Zealand, The Castrol Edge Rugby Championship in Australia and The Personal Rugby Championship in Argentina.

== Fixtures ==
=== Week 1 ===
16 August 2014
20:05 AEST (UTC+10)

Australia	12–12	New Zealand
Pen: Beale (4/5) 11', 44', 55', 69'	Report	Pen: Cruden (4/5) 3', 6', 21', 59'

Stadium Australia, Sydney
Attendance: 68,627
Referee: Jaco Peyper (South Africa)

FB	15	Israel Folau
RW	14	Pat McCabe
OC	13	Adam Ashley-Cooper
IC	12	Matt To'omua
LW	11	Rob Horne
FH	10	Kurtley Beale	(substituted off) 70'
SH	9	Nic White	(substituted off) 66'
N8	8	Wycliff Palu	(substituted off) 70'
OF	7	Michael Hooper (c)
BF	6	Scott Fardy	(substituted off) 66'
RL	5	Rob Simmons
LL	4	Sam Carter
TP	3	Sekope Kepu	(substituted off) 78'
HK	2	Nathan Charles
LP	1	James Slipper	(substituted off) 70'
Replacements:
HK	16	James Hanson
PR	17	Pekahou Cowan	(substituted on) 70'
PR	18	Ben Alexander	(substituted on) 78'
LK	19	Will Skelton	(substituted on) 70'
N8	20	Scott Higginbotham	(substituted on) 66'
SH	21	Nick Phipps	(substituted on) 66'
FH	22	Bernard Foley	(substituted on) 70'
CE	23	Tevita Kuridrani
Coach:
(Australia) Ewen McKenzie

FB	15	Ben Smith
RW	14	Cory Jane
OC	13	Malakai Fekitoa
IC	12	Ma'a Nonu		(substituted off) 57'
LW	11	Julian Savea
FH	10	Aaron Cruden		(substituted off) 63'
SH	9	Aaron Smith
N8	8	Kieran Read
OF	7	Richie McCaw (c)
BF	6	Jerome Kaino		(substituted off) 38'	(substituted on) 48'	(substituted off) 69'
RL	5	Sam Whitelock
LL	4	Brodie Retallick
TP	3	Owen Franks		(substituted off) 70'
HK	2	Dane Coles		(substituted off) 52'
LP	1	Wyatt Crockett	(yellow card) 38' to 48'		(substituted off) 48'
Replacements:
HK	16	Keven Mealamu		(substituted on) 52'
PR	17	Ben Franks		(substituted on) 38'
PR	18	Joe Moody		(substituted on) 70'
FL	19	Steve Luatua
FL	20	Sam Cane				(substituted on) 69'
SH	21	TJ Perenara
FH	22	Beauden Barrett	(yellow card) 69' to 79'	(substituted on) 63'
CE	23	Ryan Crotty		(substituted on) 57'
Coach:
(New Zealand) Steve Hansen

Man of the Match:
James Slipper (Australia)

Touch judges:
Romain Poite (France)
Stuart Berry (South Africa)
Television match official:
Shaun Veldsman (South Africa)

Notes:

- Conrad Smith was named in the starting XV, but was withdrawn from the team on 15 August to attend the birth of his first child.
- Joe Moody made his international debut for New Zealand.
- The draw ended New Zealand's 17-match winning streak, preventing them from taking sole charge of the record for longest winning streak by a Tier 1 nation.

16 August 2014
17:05 SAST (UTC+02)

South Africa	13–6	Argentina (1 BP)
Try: Pienaar 1' c Con: Pollard (1/1) 2'; Pen: Pollard (1/1) 16'; Steyn (1/1) 50'	Report	Pen: Sánchez (2/2) 7', 42'

Loftus Versfeld Stadium, Pretoria
Attendance: 30,453
Referee: John Lacey (Ireland)

FB	15	Willie le Roux
RW	14	Cornal Hendricks
OC	13	Damian de Allende
IC	12	Jean de Villiers (c)
LW	11	Bryan Habana
FH	10	Handré Pollard	(substituted off) 45'
SH	9	Ruan Pienaar
N8	8	Duane Vermeulen
OF	7	Marcell Coetzee
BF	6	Francois Louw
RL	5	Lood de Jager
LL	4	Bakkies Botha	(substituted off) 40'
TP	3	Jannie du Plessis	(substituted off) 66'
HK	2	Bismarck du Plessis	(substituted off) 55'
LP	1	Tendai Mtawarira
Replacements:
HK	16	Adriaan Strauss	(substituted on) 55'
PR	17	Trevor Nyakane
PR	18	Frans Malherbe	(substituted on) 66'
LK	19	Eben Etzebeth	(substituted on) 40'
FL	20	Oupa Mohojé
SH	21	Francois Hougaard
FH	22	Morné Steyn	(substituted on) 45'
CE	23	Jan Serfontein
Coach:
(South Africa) Heyneke Meyer

FB	15	Joaquín Tuculet
RW	14	Horacio Agulla	(substituted off) 60'
OC	13	Marcelo Bosch
IC	12	Santiago González Iglesias
LW	11	Manuel Montero
FH	10	Nicolás Sánchez	(substituted off) 64'
SH	9	Martín Landajo	(substituted off) 40'
N8	8	Juan Manuel Leguizamón
OF	7	Juan Martín Fernández Lobbe
BF	6	Pablo Matera	(substituted off) 57'
RL	5	Tomás Lavanini	(substituted off) 75'
LL	4	Mariano Galarza
TP	3	Ramiro Herrera	(substituted off) 60'
HK	2	Agustín Creevy (c)
LP	1	Marcos Ayerza
Replacements:
HK	16	Matías Cortese
PR	17	Lucas Noguera Paz
PR	18	Nahuel Tetaz Chaparro	(substituted on) 60'
LK	19	Matías Alemanno	(substituted on) 75'
N8	20	Leonardo Senatore	(substituted on) 57'
SH	21	Tomás Cubelli	(substituted on) 40'
CE	22	Jerónimo de la Fuente	(substituted on) 64'
WG	23	Lucas González Amorosino	(substituted on) 60'
Coach:
(Argentina) Daniel Hourcade

Man of the Match:
Francois Louw (South Africa)

Touch judges:
Steve Walsh (Australia)
Marius Mitrea (Italy)
Television match official:
Simon McDowell (Ireland)

Notes:

- Willem Alberts and Juan Martín Hernández were both named in their respective starting XV, but were withdrawn from their teams hours before kick off due injuries.
- Damian de Allende made his international debut for South Africa.

=== Week 2 ===
23 August 2014
19:35 NZST (UTC+12)

(1 BP) New Zealand	51–20	Australia
Try: Penalty try 27' c Savea 30' c Read 49' c McCaw (2) 53' c, 59' c Luatua 80' c Con: Cruden (5/5) 28', 31', 50', 55', 59'; A. Smith (1/1) 81'; Pen: Cruden (3/4) 5', 7', 17'	Report	Try: Folau 61' c Hooper 64' c Con: Beale (2/2) 62', 65'; Pen: Beale (2/2) 1', 13'

Eden Park, Auckland
Attendance: 48,211
Referee: Romain Poite (France)

FB	15	Ben Smith
RW	14	Cory Jane		(substituted off) 45'
OC	13	Conrad Smith
IC	12	Ryan Crotty		(substituted off) 40'
LW	11	Julian Savea
FH	10	Aaron Cruden		(substituted off) 75'
SH	9	Aaron Smith
N8	8	Kieran Read
OF	7	Richie McCaw (c)	(yellow card) 12' to 22'
BF	6	Liam Messam		(substituted off) 62'
RL	5	Sam Whitelock
LL	4	Brodie Retallick		(substituted off) 71'
TP	3	Owen Franks		(substituted off) 60'
HK	2	Dane Coles		(substituted off) 65'
LP	1	Wyatt Crockett		(substituted off) 60'
Replacements:
HK	16	Keven Mealamu		(substituted on) 65'
PR	17	Ben Franks	(yellow card) 76' to 80'	(substituted on) 60'
PR	18	Charlie Faumuina		(substituted on) 60'
FL	19	Steve Luatua		(substituted on) 62'
FL	20	Sam Cane		(substituted on) 71'
SH	21	TJ Perenara		(substituted on) 75'
FH	22	Beauden Barrett		(substituted on) 45'
CE	23	Malakai Fekitoa		(substituted on) 40'
Coach:
(New Zealand) Steve Hansen

FB	15	Israel Folau
RW	14	Pat McCabe		(substituted off) 62'
OC	13	Adam Ashley-Cooper
IC	12	Matt To'omua		(substituted off) 55'
LW	11	Rob Horne
FH	10	Kurtley Beale
SH	9	Nic White		(substituted off) 51'
N8	8	Wycliff Palu		(substituted off) 55'
OF	7	Michael Hooper (c)
BF	6	Scott Fardy		(substituted off) 64'
RL	5	Rob Simmons	(yellow card) 22' to 32'
LL	4	Sam Carter
TP	3	Sekope Kepu		(substituted off) 64'
HK	2	Nathan Charles		(substituted off) 31'
LP	1	James Slipper
Replacements:
HK	16	James Hanson		(substituted on) 31'
PR	17	Pekahou Cowan
PR	18	Ben Alexander		(substituted on) 64'
LK	19	Will Skelton		(substituted on) 64'
N8	20	Scott Higginbotham		(substituted on) 55'
SH	21	Nick Phipps		(substituted on) 51'
FH	22	Bernard Foley		(substituted on) 55'
CE	23	Tevita Kuridrani		(substituted on) 62'
Coach:
(Australia) Ewen McKenzie

Man of the Match:
Brodie Retallick (New Zealand)

Touch judges:
Jaco Peyper (South Africa)
Stuart Berry (South Africa)
Television match official:
Shaun Veldsman (South Africa)

Notes:

- Cory Jane earned his 50th test cap for New Zealand.
- New Zealand retain the Bledisloe Cup.

23 August 2014
16:40 AST (UTC-03)

(1 BP) Argentina	31–33	South Africa
Try: Montero 25' c Cubelli 46' c Tuculet 50' m Con: Sánchez (2/3) 26', 46'; Pen: Sánchez (2/4) 3', 55; Bosch (1/1) 73'; Drop: Hernández (1/1) 12'	Report	Try: Habana 31' c Hendricks 59' c Coetzee 68' c Con: Pollard (1/1) 32'; Steyn (2/2) 59', 69'; Pen: Pollard (3/3) 10', 22', 29'; Steyn (1/1) 76'

Estadio Padre Ernesto Martearena, Salta
Attendance: 17,000
Referee: Steve Walsh (Australia)

FB	15	Joaquín Tuculet
RW	14	Lucas González Amorosino
OC	13	Marcelo Bosch
IC	12	Juan Martín Hernández
LW	11	Manuel Montero	(substituted off) 77'
FH	10	Nicolás Sánchez	(substituted off) 77'
SH	9	Martín Landajo	(substituted off) 33'
N8	8	Juan Manuel Leguizamón
OF	7	Juan Martín Fernández Lobbe
BF	6	Pablo Matera	(substituted off) 35'
RL	5	Tomás Lavanini	(substituted off) 69'
LL	4	Mariano Galarza
TP	3	Ramiro Herrera	(substituted off) 67'
HK	2	Agustín Creevy (c)	(substituted off) 80'
LP	1	Marcos Ayerza	(substituted off) 77'
Replacements:
HK	16	Matías Cortese	(substituted on) 80'
PR	17	Bruno Postiglioni	(substituted on) 77'
PR	18	Nahuel Tetaz Chaparro	(substituted on) 67'
LK	19	Matías Alemanno	(substituted on) 69'
N8	20	Leonardo Senatore	(substituted on) 35'
SH	21	Tomás Cubelli	(substituted on) 33'
CE	22	Jerónimo de la Fuente	(substituted on) 77'
WG	23	Horacio Agulla	(substituted on) 77'
Coach:
(Argentina) Daniel Hourcade

FB	15	Willie le Roux
RW	14	Cornal Hendricks
OC	13	Damian de Allende
IC	12	Jean de Villiers (c)
LW	11	Bryan Habana
FH	10	Handré Pollard	(substituted off) 55'
SH	9	Ruan Pienaar	(substituted off) 59'
N8	8	Duane Vermeulen
OF	7	Juan Smith	(substituted off) 51'
BF	6	Francois Louw
RL	5	Lood de Jager
LL	4	Eben Etzebeth	(substituted off) 69'
TP	3	Jannie du Plessis	(substituted off) 45'	(substituted on) 78'
HK	2	Bismarck du Plessis	(substituted off) 51'
LP	1	Gurthrö Steenkamp	(substituted off) 45'
Replacements:
HK	16	Adriaan Strauss	(substituted on) 51'
PR	17	Tendai Mtawarira	(substituted on) 45'
PR	18	Frans Malherbe	(substituted on) 45'	(substituted off) 78'
LK	19	Bakkies Botha	(substituted on) 69'
FL	20	Marcell Coetzee	(substituted on) 51'
SH	21	Francois Hougaard	(substituted on) 59'
FH	22	Morné Steyn	(substituted on) 55'
WG	23	Lwazi Mvovo
Coach:
(South Africa) Heyneke Meyer

Man of the Match:
Nicolás Sánchez (Argentina)

Touch judges:
John Lacey (Ireland)
Marius Mitrea (Italy)
Television match official:
Vinny Munro (New Zealand)

Notes:

- Marcos Ayerza earned his 50th test cap for Argentina.
- This loss was Argentina's seventh consecutive loss at home, the most consecutive losses at home.

=== Week 3 ===
6 September 2014
19:35 NZST (UTC+12)

(1 BP) New Zealand	28–9	Argentina
Try: Savea (2) 26' m, 43' m Messam 40' m A. Smith 72' c Con: Slade (1/1) 73'; Pen: Barrett (1/2) 15'; Slade (1/2) 64'	Report	Pen: Sánchez (3/3) 18', 32', 62'

McLean Park, Napier
Attendance: 21,329
Referee: Pascal Gaüzère (France)

FB	15	Israel Dagg
RW	14	Ben Smith
OC	13	Conrad Smith
IC	12	Ma'a Nonu
LW	11	Julian Savea
FH	10	Beauden Barrett	(substituted off) 55'
SH	9	Aaron Smith	(substituted off) 73'
N8	8	Kieran Read
OF	7	Richie McCaw (c)
BF	6	Liam Messam	(substituted off) 43'
RL	5	Sam Whitelock	(substituted off) 27'
LL	4	Brodie Retallick
TP	3	Owen Franks	(substituted off) 65'
HK	2	Dane Coles	(substituted off) 65'
LP	1	Wyatt Crockett	(substituted off) 58'
Replacements:
HK	16	Keven Mealamu	(substituted on) 65'
PR	17	Joe Moody	(substituted on) 58'
PR	18	Ben Franks	(substituted on) 65'
LK	19	Jeremy Thrush	(substituted on) 27'
FL	20	Sam Cane	(substituted on) 43'
SH	21	TJ Perenara	(substituted on) 73'
FH	22	Colin Slade	(substituted on) 55'
CE	23	Malakai Fekitoa
Coach:
(New Zealand) Steve Hansen

FB	15	Joaquín Tuculet
RW	14	Horacio Agulla	(substituted off) 65'
OC	13	Marcelo Bosch
IC	12	Juan Martín Hernández
LW	11	Lucas González Amorosino
FH	10	Nicolás Sánchez	(substituted off) 73'
SH	9	Martín Landajo	(substituted off) 54'
N8	8	Leonardo Senatore	(substituted off) 65'
OF	7	Juan Martín Fernández Lobbe
BF	6	Juan Manuel Leguizamón
RL	5	Tomás Lavanini
LL	4	Mariano Galarza	(substituted off) 73'
TP	3	Ramiro Herrera	(substituted off) 66'
HK	2	Agustín Creevy (c)	(substituted off) 73'
LP	1	Marcos Ayerza	(substituted off) 65'
Replacements:
HK	16	Matías Cortese	(substituted on) 73'
PR	17	Lucas Noguera Paz	(substituted on) 65'
PR	18	Nahuel Tetaz Chaparro	(substituted on) 66'
LK	19	Matías Alemanno	(substituted on) 73'
FL	20	Rodrigo Baez	(substituted on) 65'
SH	21	Tomás Cubelli	(substituted on) 54'
FH	22	Santiago González Iglesias	(substituted on) 73'
WG	23	Juan Imhoff	(substituted on) 65'
Coach:
(Argentina) Daniel Hourcade

Man of the Match:
Brodie Retallick (New Zealand)

Touch judges:
Jérôme Garcès (France)
Rohan Hoffmann (Australia)
Television match official:
Peter Marshall (Australia)

6 September 2014
18:05 AWST (UTC+08)

Australia	24–23	South Africa (1 BP)
Try: Folau 1' m Horne 77' c Con: Foley (1/2) 78'; Pen: Foley (4/4) 16', 27', 41', 68'	Report	Try: Hendricks 12' m Pen: Steyn (6/6) 6', 18', 24', 44', 48', 62'

Subiaco Oval, Perth
Attendance: 25,718
Referee: George Clancy (Ireland)

FB	15	Israel Folau
RW	14	Adam Ashley-Cooper
OC	13	Tevita Kuridrani
IC	12	Matt To'omua	(substituted off) 72'
LW	11	Rob Horne
FH	10	Bernard Foley
SH	9	Nick Phipps
N8	8	Wycliff Palu	(substituted off) 59'
OF	7	Michael Hooper (c)
BF	6	Scott Fardy	(substituted off) 70'
RL	5	Rob Simmons
LL	4	Sam Carter	(substituted off) 59'
TP	3	Sekope Kepu	(substituted off) 66'
HK	2	James Hanson
LP	1	James Slipper	(substituted off) 52'
Replacements:
HK	16	Joshua Mann-Rea
PR	17	Pekahou Cowan	(substituted on) 52'
PR	18	Ben Alexander	(substituted on) 66'
LK	19	James Horwill	(substituted on) 59'
N8	20	Scott Higginbotham	(substituted on) 59'
FL	21	Matt Hodgson	(substituted on) 70'
SH	22	Nic White
FH	23	Kurtley Beale	(substituted on) 72'
Coach:
(Australia) Ewen McKenzie

FB	15	Willie le Roux
RW	14	Cornal Hendricks
OC	13	Jan Serfontein
IC	12	Jean de Villiers (c)
LW	11	Bryan Habana	(yellow card) 65' to 75'
FH	10	Morné Steyn
SH	9	Ruan Pienaar
N8	8	Duane Vermeulen
OF	7	Marcell Coetzee
BF	6	Francois Louw		(substituted off) 69'
RL	5	Victor Matfield
LL	4	Eben Etzebeth		(substituted off) 72'
TP	3	Jannie du Plessis		(substituted off) 66'
HK	2	Adriaan Strauss		(substituted off) 60'
LP	1	Tendai Mtawarira		(substituted off) 69'
Replacements:
HK	16	Bismarck du Plessis		(substituted on) 60'
PR	17	Trevor Nyakane		(substituted on) 69'
PR	18	Marcel van der Merwe		(substituted on) 66'
LK	19	Lood de Jager		(substituted on) 72'
N8	20	Warren Whiteley			(substituted on) 79'
SH	21	Francois Hougaard
FH	22	Pat Lambie		(substituted on) 69'	(substituted off) 79'
CE	23	Damian de Allende
Coach:
(South Africa) Heyneke Meyer

Man of the Match:
Tevita Kuridrani (Australia)

Touch judges:
Glen Jackson (New Zealand)
Mike Fraser (New Zealand)
Television match official:
Ben Skeen (New Zealand)

Notes:

- Saia Fainga'a was named on the bench, but was withdrawn from the squad to attend the birth of his child.
- Bryan Habana became the fourth South Africa player to earn 100 test caps.
- Warren Whiteley made his international debut for South Africa.

=== Week 4 ===
13 September 2014
19:35 NZST (UTC+12)

New Zealand	14–10	South Africa (1 BP)
Try: McCaw 46' m Pen: Cruden (2/3) 10', 23'; Barrett (1/1) 66'	Report	Try: Hendricks 15'; Con: Pollard (1/1) 16'; Drop: Pollard (1/1) 55'

Wellington Regional Stadium, Wellington
Attendance: 35,747
Referee: Jérôme Garcès (France)

FB	15	Israel Dagg
RW	14	Ben Smith
OC	13	Conrad Smith
IC	12	Ma'a Nonu	(substituted off) 40'
LW	11	Julian Savea
FH	10	Aaron Cruden	(substituted off) 58'
SH	9	Aaron Smith
N8	8	Kieran Read
OF	7	Richie McCaw (c)
BF	6	Steve Luatua	(substituted off) 50'
RL	5	Jeremy Thrush	(substituted off) 77'
LL	4	Brodie Retallick
TP	3	Owen Franks	(substituted off) 58'
HK	2	Dane Coles	(substituted off) 70'
LP	1	Wyatt Crockett	(substituted off) 58'
Replacements:
HK	16	Keven Mealamu	(substituted on) 70'
PR	17	Joe Moody	(substituted on) 58'
PR	18	Ben Franks	(substituted on) 58'
LK	19	Patrick Tuipulotu	(substituted on) 77'
FL	20	Sam Cane	(substituted on) 50'
SH	21	TJ Perenara
FH	22	Beauden Barrett	(substituted on) 58'
WG	23	Cory Jane	(substituted on) 40'
Coach:
(New Zealand) Steve Hansen

FB	15	Willie le Roux	(substituted off) 70'
RW	14	Cornal Hendricks
OC	13	Jan Serfontein
IC	12	Jean de Villiers (c)
LW	11	Bryan Habana
FH	10	Handré Pollard
SH	9	Ruan Pienaar	(substituted off) 35'
N8	8	Duane Vermeulen
OF	7	Marcell Coetzee
BF	6	Francois Louw	(substituted off) 47'
RL	5	Victor Matfield
LL	4	Eben Etzebeth	(substituted off) 70'
TP	3	Jannie du Plessis	(substituted off) 77'
HK	2	Adriaan Strauss	(substituted off) 54'
LP	1	Tendai Mtawarira	(substituted off) 66'
Replacements:
HK	16	Bismarck du Plessis	(substituted on) 54'
PR	17	Trevor Nyakane	(substituted on) 66'
PR	18	Marcel van der Merwe	(substituted on) 77'
LK	19	Lood de Jager	(substituted on) 70'
N8	20	Warren Whiteley	(substituted on) 47'
SH	21	Francois Hougaard	(substituted on) 35'
FH	22	Pat Lambie	(substituted on) 70'
CE	23	Damian de Allende
Coach:
(South Africa) Heyneke Meyer

Man of the Match:
Duane Vermeulen (South Africa)

Touch judges:
Pascal Gaüzère (France)
Rohan Hoffmann (Australia)
Television match official:
Peter Marshall (Australia)

Notes:

- Jean de Villiers became the fifth South Africa player to earn 100 test caps.
- New Zealand retained the Freedom Cup.

13 September 2014
20:05 AEST (UTC+10)

Australia	32–25	Argentina (1 BP)
Try: Hooper (2) 2' m, 43' c Betham 59' m Con: Foley (1/3) 44'; Pen: Foley (5/5) 15', 38', 40', 54', 73'	Report	Try: Montero 6' c Bosch 63' c Tuculet 70' m Con: Sánchez (2/3) 7', 65'; Pen: Sánchez (2/3) 49', 57'

Robina Stadium, Gold Coast
Attendance: 14,281
Referee: Glen Jackson (New Zealand)

FB	15	Israel Folau
RW	14	Peter Betham	(substituted off) 70'
OC	13	Tevita Kuridrani
IC	12	Matt To'omua	(substituted off) 52'
LW	11	Rob Horne
FH	10	Bernard Foley
SH	9	Nick Phipps
N8	8	Ben McCalman	(substituted off) 69'
OF	7	Michael Hooper (c)
BF	6	Scott Fardy	(substituted off) 49'
RL	5	Rob Simmons
LL	4	Sam Carter	(substituted off) 61'
TP	3	Sekope Kepu	(substituted off) 58'
HK	2	Tatafu Polota-Nau	(substituted off) 40'
LP	1	James Slipper	(substituted off) 49'
Replacements:
HK	16	James Hanson	(substituted on) 40'
PR	17	Pekahou Cowan	(substituted on) 49'
PR	18	Ben Alexander	(substituted on) 58'
LK	19	James Horwill	(substituted on) 61'
N8	20	Scott Higginbotham	(substituted on) 49'
FL	21	Matt Hodgson	(substituted on) 69'
SH	22	Nic White	(substituted on) 70'
FH	23	Kurtley Beale	(substituted on) 52'
Coach:
(Australia) Ewen McKenzie

FB	15	Joaquín Tuculet
RW	14	Juan Imhoff
OC	13	Marcelo Bosch
IC	12	Juan Martín Hernández	(substituted off) 50'
LW	11	Manuel Montero	(substituted off) 79'
FH	10	Nicolás Sánchez
SH	9	Martín Landajo	(substituted off) 55'
N8	8	Leonardo Senatore	(substituted off) 35'	(substituted on) 40'
OF	7	Juan Martín Fernández Lobbe
BF	6	Juan Manuel Leguizamón	(substituted off) 50'
RL	5	Matías Alemanno
LL	4	Mariano Galarza			(substituted off) 67'
TP	3	Ramiro Herrera	(substituted off) 58'
HK	2	Agustín Creevy (c)	(substituted off) 72'
LP	1	Marcos Ayerza	(substituted off) 50'	(substituted on) 66'	(substituted off) 67'
Replacements:
HK	16	Matías Cortese	(substituted on) 72'
PR	17	Bruno Postiglioni	(substituted on) 50'	(substituted off) 66'	(substituted on) 67'
PR	18	Nahuel Tetaz Chaparro	(substituted on) 58'
N8	19	Benjamín Macome	(substituted on) 35'	(substituted off) 40'	(substituted on) 67'
FL	20	Rodrigo Baez	(substituted on) 50'
SH	21	Tomás Cubelli	(substituted on) 55'
CE	22	Jerónimo de la Fuente	(substituted on) 50'
WG	23	Lucas González Amorosino	(substituted on) 79'
Coach:
(Argentina) Daniel Hourcade

Man of the Match:
Bernard Foley (Australia)

Touch judges:
George Clancy (Ireland)
Mike Fraser (New Zealand)
Television match official:
Ben Skeen (New Zealand)

Notes:

- The attendance of 14,281 was the lowest attendance for an Australia home test match this century.
- Tatafu Polota-Nau earned his 50th test cap for Australia.
- Australia retained the Puma Trophy.

=== Week 5 ===
27 September 2014
17:05 SAST (UTC+02)

(1 BP) South Africa	28–10	Australia
Try: Coetzee 12' m De Villiers (2) 71', 80'; Lambie 78' m Con: Lambie (1/3) 80+2'; Pen: Pollard (1/1) 43'; Drop: Lambie (1/1) 69'	Report	Try: Ashley-Cooper 25' c Con: Foley (1/1) 27'; Pen: Foley (1/2) 24'

Newlands Stadium, Cape Town
Attendance: 44,955
Referee: Nigel Owens (Wales)

FB	15	Willie le Roux
RW	14	Cornal Hendricks
OC	13	Jan Serfontein
IC	12	Jean de Villiers (c)
LW	11	Bryan Habana	26' to 37'		(substituted off) 40'
FH	10	Handré Pollard	(substituted off) 58'
SH	9	Francois Hougaard	(substituted off) 77'
N8	8	Duane Vermeulen	(substituted off) 61'
OF	7	Oupa Mohojé	(substituted off) 54'
BF	6	Marcell Coetzee
RL	5	Victor Matfield
LL	4	Eben Etzebeth
TP	3	Jannie du Plessis	(substituted off) 65'
HK	2	Adriaan Strauss	(substituted off) 58'
LP	1	Tendai Mtawarira	(substituted off) 69'
Replacements:
HK	16	Bismarck du Plessis	(substituted on) 58'
PR	17	Trevor Nyakane	(substituted on) 69'
PR	18	Marcel van der Merwe	(substituted on) 65'
LK	19	Bakkies Botha	(substituted on) 61'
FL	20	Schalk Burger	(substituted on) 54'
SH	21	Cobus Reinach	(substituted on) 77'
FH	22	Pat Lambie	(substituted on) 58'
CE	23	JP Pietersen	(substituted on) 26'	(substituted off) 37'	(substituted on) 40'
Coach:
(South Africa) Heyneke Meyer

FB	15	Israel Folau
RW	14	Adam Ashley-Cooper
OC	13	Tevita Kuridrani
IC	12	Matt To'omua	(substituted off) 54'
LW	11	Joe Tomane	(substituted off) 66'
FH	10	Bernard Foley
SH	9	Nick Phipps
N8	8	Ben McCalman	(substituted off) 58'
OF	7	Michael Hooper (c)
BF	6	Scott Fardy
RL	5	Rob Simmons	(substituted off) 40'
LL	4	Sam Carter
TP	3	Sekope Kepu	(substituted off) 69'
HK	2	Saia Fainga'a	(substituted off) 61'
LP	1	James Slipper	(substituted off) 65'
Replacements:
HK	16	James Hanson	(substituted on) 61'
PR	17	Benn Robinson	(substituted on) 65'
PR	18	Ben Alexander	(substituted on) 69'
LK	19	James Horwill	(substituted on) 40'
N8	20	Scott Higginbotham	(substituted on) 58'
SH	21	Nic White
FH	22	Kurtley Beale	(substituted on) 54'
WG	23	Rob Horne	(substituted on) 66'
Coach:
(Australia) Ewen McKenzie

Man of the Match:
Francois Hougaard (South Africa)

Touch judges:
Wayne Barnes (England)
Mathieu Raynal (France)
Television match official:
Graham Hughes (England)

Notes:

- Cobus Reinach made his international debut for South Africa.
- South Africa retain the Mandela Challenge Plate.

27 September 2014
19:10 AST (UTC-03)

Argentina	13–34	New Zealand (1 BP)
Try: Agulla 78' c Con: González Iglesias (1/1) 79'; Pen: Sánchez (2/3) 16', 35'	Report	Try: B. Smith 11' c Dagg 24' c Savea 56' c Perenara 67' c Con: Barrett (4/4) 12', 25', 57', 68'; Pen: Barrett (2/2) 3', 8'

Estadio Ciudad de La Plata, La Plata
Attendance: 37,000
Referee: Craig Joubert (South Africa)

FB	15	Joaquín Tuculet
RW	14	Juan Imhoff
OC	13	Marcelo Bosch	(substituted off) 65'
IC	12	Juan Martín Hernández	(substituted off) 58'
LW	11	Manuel Montero
FH	10	Nicolás Sánchez
SH	9	Tomás Cubelli	(substituted off) 53'
N8	8	Leonardo Senatore	(substituted off) 58'
OF	7	Juan Martín Fernández Lobbe
BF	6	Benjamín Macome
RL	5	Tomás Lavanini
LL	4	Mariano Galarza	(substituted off) 62'
TP	3	Ramiro Herrera	(substituted off) 52'
HK	2	Agustín Creevy (c)	(substituted off) 69'
LP	1	Marcos Ayerza	(substituted off) 64'
Replacements:
HK	16	Matías Cortese	(substituted on) 69'
PR	17	Lucas Noguera Paz	(substituted on) 64'
PR	18	Nahuel Tetaz Chaparro	(substituted on) 52'
LK	19	Matías Alemanno	(substituted on) 62'
FL	20	Rodrigo Baez	(substituted on) 58'
SH	21	Martín Landajo	(substituted on) 53'
FH	22	Santiago González Iglesias	(substituted on) 58'
WG	23	Horacio Agulla	(substituted on) 65'
Coach:
(Argentina) Daniel Hourcade

FB	15	Israel Dagg
RW	14	Ben Smith
OC	13	Conrad Smith	(substituted off) 71'
IC	12	Malakai Fekitoa
LW	11	Julian Savea
FH	10	Beauden Barrett
SH	9	Aaron Smith	(substituted off) 64'
N8	8	Kieran Read
OF	7	Richie McCaw (c)	(substituted off) 64'
BF	6	Jerome Kaino
RL	5	Sam Whitelock
LL	4	Brodie Retallick	(substituted off) 53'
TP	3	Owen Franks	(substituted off) 71'
HK	2	Keven Mealamu	(substituted off) 71'
LP	1	Wyatt Crockett	1' to 12'		(substituted off) 53'
Replacements:
HK	16	Nathan Harris	(substituted on) 71'
PR	17	Joe Moody	(substituted on) 1'	(substituted off) 12'	(substituted on) 53'
PR	18	Ben Franks	(substituted on) 71'
LK	19	Jeremy Thrush	(substituted on) 53'
FL	20	Sam Cane	(substituted on) 64'
SH	21	TJ Perenara	(substituted on) 64'
FH	22	Colin Slade	(substituted on) 71'
WG	23	Cory Jane
Coach:
(New Zealand) Steve Hansen

Man of the Match:
Jerome Kaino (New Zealand)

Touch judges:
Jérôme Garcès (France)
Leighton Hodges (Wales)
Television match official:
Deon van Blommestein (South Africa)

Notes:

- Nathan Harris made his international debut for New Zealand.

=== Week 6 ===
4 October 2014
17:05 SAST (UTC+02)

South Africa	27–25	New Zealand (1 BP)
Try: Hougaard 11' c Pollard (2) 26' c, 39' c Con: Pollard (3/3) 12', 27', 39'; Pen: Pollard (1/2) 46'; Lambie (1/1) 78'	Report	Try: Fekitoa 32' c B. Smith 65' c Coles 69' m Con: Barrett (2/3) 33', 66'; Pen: Barrett (2/2) 8', 23'

Ellis Park Stadium, Johannesburg
Attendance: 61,261
Referee: Wayne Barnes (England)

FB	15	Willie le Roux
RW	14	Cornal Hendricks	(substituted off) 57'
OC	13	Jan Serfontein
IC	12	Jean de Villiers (c)
LW	11	Bryan Habana
FH	10	Handré Pollard	(substituted off) 62'
SH	9	Francois Hougaard	(substituted off) 67'
N8	8	Duane Vermeulen
OF	7	Oupa Mohojé	(substituted off) 49'
BF	6	Marcell Coetzee
RL	5	Victor Matfield
LL	4	Eben Etzebeth	(substituted off) 62'
TP	3	Jannie du Plessis	(substituted off) 62'
HK	2	Bismarck du Plessis	(substituted off) 52'
LP	1	Tendai Mtawarira	(substituted off) 72'
Replacements:
HK	16	Adriaan Strauss	(substituted on) 52'
PR	17	Trevor Nyakane	(substituted on) 72'
PR	18	Marcel van der Merwe	(substituted on) 62'
LK	19	Bakkies Botha	(substituted on) 62'
FL	20	Schalk Burger	(substituted on) 49'
SH	21	Cobus Reinach	(substituted on) 67'
FH	22	Pat Lambie	(substituted on) 62'
CE	23	JP Pietersen	(substituted on) 57'
Coach:
(South Africa) Heyneke Meyer

FB	15	Israel Dagg
RW	14	Ben Smith
OC	13	Conrad Smith	(substituted off) 73'
IC	12	Malakai Fekitoa
LW	11	Julian Savea
FH	10	Beauden Barrett
SH	9	Aaron Smith	(substituted off) 65'
N8	8	Kieran Read
OF	7	Richie McCaw (c)
BF	6	Jerome Kaino	(substituted off) 60'
RL	5	Sam Whitelock
LL	4	Jeremy Thrush	(substituted off) 48'
TP	3	Owen Franks	(substituted off) 57'
HK	2	Keven Mealamu	(substituted off) 48'
LP	1	Joe Moody	(substituted off) 40'
Replacements:
HK	16	Dane Coles	(substituted on) 48'
PR	17	Ben Franks	(substituted on) 40'
PR	18	Charlie Faumuina	(substituted on) 57'
FL	19	Steve Luatua	(substituted on) 60'
FL	20	Liam Messam	(substituted on) 48'
SH	21	Tawera Kerr-Barlow	(substituted on) 65'	(substituted off) 74'
FH	22	Colin Slade		(substituted on) 74'
CE	23	Ryan Crotty	(substituted on) 73'
Coach:
(New Zealand) Steve Hansen

Man of the Match:
Duane Vermeulen (South Africa)

Touch judges:
Pascal Gauzère (France)
JP Doyle (RFU)
Television match official:
Graham Hughes (RFU)

Notes:

- This loss, was New Zealand's first loss in The Rugby Championship since its formation in 2012.
- South Africa becomes the first team to beat New Zealand, since the All Black's 38–21 loss to England in 2012.
- This was South Africa's first win over New Zealand since their 18–5 win during the 2011 Tri Nations Series.

4 October 2014
19:40 AST (UTC-03)

Argentina	21–17	Australia (1 BP)
Try: Senatore 34' m Imhoff 52' c Con: Sánchez (1/2) 53'; Pen: Sánchez (3/5) 40', 43', 74'	Report	Try: Kuridrani 2' c Higginbotham 12' c Con: Foley (2/2) 4', 13'; Pen: Foley (1/3) 47'

Estadio Malvinas Argentinas, Mendoza
Attendance: 26,000
Referee: Nigel Owens (Wales)

FB	15	Joaquín Tuculet	(substituted off) 74'
RW	14	Juan Imhoff
OC	13	Horacio Agulla	(substituted off) 69'
IC	12	Juan Martín Hernández
LW	11	Lucas González Amorosino
FH	10	Nicolás Sánchez
SH	9	Martín Landajo	(substituted off) 58'
N8	8	Leonardo Senatore
OF	7	Benjamín Macome	(substituted off) 13'
BF	6	Rodrigo Báez
RL	5	Tomás Lavanini
LL	4	Mariano Galarza	(substituted off) 73'
TP	3	Nahuel Tetaz Chaparro	(substituted off) 63'
HK	2	Agustín Creevy (c)
LP	1	Marcos Ayerza	(substituted off) 66'
Replacements:
HK	16	Matías Cortese
PR	17	Bruno Postiglioni	(substituted on) 66'
PR	18	Ramiro Herrera	(substituted on) 63'
LK	19	Matías Alemanno	(substituted on) 73'
FL	20	Javier Ortega Desio	(substituted on) 13'
SH	21	Tomás Cubelli	(substituted on) 58'
CE	22	Marcelo Bosch	(substituted on) 69'
CE	23	Jerónimo de la Fuente	(substituted on) 74'
Coach:
(Argentina) Daniel Hourcade

FB	15	Israel Folau
RW	14	Adam Ashley-Cooper
OC	13	Tevita Kuridrani
IC	12	Matt To'omua		(substituted off) 30'
LW	11	Joe Tomane
FH	10	Bernard Foley
SH	9	Nick Phipps	(yellow card) 42' to 52'	(substituted off) 63'
N8	8	Scott Higginbotham		(substituted off) 58'
OF	7	Michael Hooper (c)	(yellow card) 73' to 80'
BF	6	Scott Fardy
RL	5	James Horwill		(substituted off) 67'
LL	4	Sam Carter
TP	3	Sekope Kepu		(substituted off) 58'
HK	2	Saia Fainga'a		(substituted off) 71'
LP	1	James Slipper		(substituted off) 58'
Replacements:
HK	16	Joshua Mann-Rea		(substituted on) 71'
PR	17	Benn Robinson		(substituted on) 58'
PR	18	Ben Alexander		(substituted on) 58'
LK	19	Will Skelton		(substituted on) 67'
N8	20	Jake Schatz		(substituted on) 58'
FL	21	Matt Hodgson
SH	22	Nic White		(substituted on) 63'
WG	23	Rob Horne		(substituted on) 30'
Coach:
(Australia) Ewen McKenzie

Touch judges:
Craig Joubert (South Africa)
Leighton Hodges (Wales)
Television match official:
Deon van Blommestein (South Africa)

Notes:

- This was Argentina's first ever win in The Rugby Championship since its formation in 2012.
- This was Argentina's first win over Australia since their 18–16 win in 1997.
- Jake Schatz and Joshua Mann-Rea made their international debuts for Australia.

== Warm-up matches ==
On 25 July and 2 August, Argentina played two uncapped matches against French Top 14 side Grenoble in preparation for the tournament. This was the third year in which Argentina had played two warm-up matches pre Rugby Championship; New South Wales Waratahs Barbarians in 2013 and Stade Français in 2012.

25 July 2014	Argentina	44–21	Grenoble	C.A.S.I., San Isidro
20:10 AST (UTC-03)	Try: Imhoff 21' c Leguizamón 24' m Montero 34' m Penalty try 60' c Moroni 66' c González Amorosino 78' c Con: Sánchez (2/4) 21', 61'; González Iglesias (2/2) 67', 78'; Pen: Sánchez (2/3) 6', 51'	Report (In Spanish)	Try: Caminati 27'; Héguy 80' m Con: Wisniewski (1/2) 28'; Pen: Wisniewski (3/3) 32', 37', 41'	Referee: Federico Anselmi (Argentina)

2 August 2014	Argentina	56–22	Grenoble	Estadio Bicentenario Ciudad de Catamarca, Catamarca
16:10 AST (UTC-03)	Try: Imhoff (2) 13' c, 65' c De la Fuente 16' c Fernández Lobbe 56' c Senatore 67' c Tuculet 70' c Agulla 75' m Con: Sánchez (4/4) 14', 17', 57', 65'; González Iglesias (2/3) 68', 71'; Pen: Sánchez (3/4) 26', 59', 63'	Report (In Spanish)	Try: Thiéry 7' c Roodt 32' c Hayes 46' m Con: Wisniewski (2/3) 7', 33'; Pen: Wisniewski (1/1) 36'	Referee: Francisco Pastrana (Argentina)

== Squads ==
=== Summary ===
Nation	Match venues			Head coach	Captain
Nation	Name	City	Capacity	Head coach	Captain
Argentina	Estadio Ciudad de La Plata	La Plata	53,000	(Argentina) Daniel Hourcade	Agustín Creevy
Argentina	Estadio Malvinas Argentinas	Mendoza	40,268	(Argentina) Daniel Hourcade	Agustín Creevy
Argentina	Estadio Padre Ernesto Martearena	Salta	20,408	(Argentina) Daniel Hourcade	Agustín Creevy
Australia	Stadium Australia	Sydney	84,000	(Australia) Ewen McKenzie	Michael Hooper
Australia	Subiaco Oval	Perth	43,500	(Australia) Ewen McKenzie	Michael Hooper
Australia	Robina Stadium	Gold Coast	27,400	(Australia) Ewen McKenzie	Michael Hooper
New Zealand	Eden Park	Auckland	50,000	(New Zealand) Steve Hansen	Richie McCaw
New Zealand	Wellington Regional Stadium	Wellington	34,500	(New Zealand) Steve Hansen	Richie McCaw
New Zealand	McLean Park	Napier	22,000	(New Zealand) Steve Hansen	Richie McCaw
South Africa	Ellis Park Stadium	Johannesburg	62,567	(South Africa) Heyneke Meyer	Jean de Villiers
South Africa	Newlands Stadium	Cape Town	51,900	(South Africa) Heyneke Meyer	Jean de Villiers
South Africa	Loftus Versfeld Stadium	Pretoria	51,762	(South Africa) Heyneke Meyer	Jean de Villiers

Note: Ages, caps and domestic side are of 16 August 2014 – the starting date of the tournament.

=== Argentina ===
Argentina 30-man squad for the Championship was announced on 23 June. In addition to the 30-man squad, a further nine players were invited to train with the squad and acted as stand-by players should a call-up have been necessary. Those players are: hookers Julián Montoya (Newman) and Santiago Iglesias (Uni. Tucumán), lock Guido Petti (San Isidro), number 8 Benjamín Macome, scrum-half Felipe Ezcurra (Hindú), fly-half Patricio Fernández (Jockey Club), centres Matías Moroni (CUBA) and Javier Rojas (Uni. Tucumán) and winger Ramiro Moyano (Lince R.C.)

On 15 July, Marcos Ayerza was added to the squad to provide further options in the front row.

On 10 September, Benjamín Macome was promoted to the main squad as cover for Tomás Lavanini, who was unable to play in the fourth round.

Note: Flags indicate national union for the club/province as defined by World Rugby.

Player	Position	Date of birth (age)	Caps	Club/province
Matías Cortese	Hooker	1 October 1985 (aged 28)	7	(Argentina) Liceo
Agustín Creevy (c)	Hooker	15 March 1985 (aged 29)	28	(England) Worcester Warriors
Marcos Ayerza	Prop	12 January 1983 (aged 31)	48	(England) Leicester Tigers
Nahuel Tetaz Chaparro	Prop	6 November 1989 (aged 24)	7	(Argentina) La Plata
Ramiro Herrera	Prop	14 February 1989 (aged 25)	2	(France) Castres
Lucas Noguera Paz	Prop	10 May 1993 (aged 21)	5	(Argentina) Lince R.C.
Bruno Postiglioni	Prop	8 April 1987 (aged 27)	13	(Argentina) La Plata
Matías Alemanno	Lock	5 December 1991 (aged 22)	5	(Argentina) Tablada
Mariano Galarza	Lock	11 December 1986 (aged 27)	18	(England) Gloucester
Tomás Lavanini	Lock	22 January 1993 (aged 21)	10	(Argentina) Hindú
Rodrigo Báez	Flanker	8 February 1989 (aged 25)	11	(Argentina) Liceo
Juan Manuel Leguizamón	Flanker	6 June 1983 (aged 31)	55	(France) Lyon
Pablo Matera	Flanker	18 July 1993 (aged 21)	11	(England) Leicester Tigers
Javier Ortega Desio	Flanker	14 June 1990 (aged 24)	8	(Argentina) Paraná
Tomás de la Vega	Flanker	28 September 1990 (aged 23)	12	(Argentina) CUBA
Juan Martín Fernández Lobbe	Number 8	19 November 1981 (aged 32)	56	(France) Toulon
Benjamín Macome	Number 8	1 October 1986 (aged 27)	18	Unattached
Leonardo Senatore	Number 8	13 May 1984 (aged 30)	20	(England) Worcester Warriors
Tomás Cubelli	Scrum-half	12 June 1989 (aged 25)	25	(Argentina) Belgrano
Martín Landajo	Scrum-half	14 June 1988 (aged 26)	31	(Argentina) C.A.S.I.
Santiago González Iglesias	Fly-half	16 June 1988 (aged 26)	7	(Argentina) Alumni
Nicolás Sánchez	Fly-half	26 October 1988 (aged 25)	21	Unattached
Marcelo Bosch	Centre	7 January 1984 (aged 30)	25	(England) Saracens
Jerónimo de la Fuente	Centre	24 February 1991 (aged 23)	4	(Argentina) Duendes
Matías Orlando	Centre	14 November 1991 (aged 22)	9	(Argentina) Huirapuca
Horacio Agulla	Wing	22 October 1984 (aged 29)	51	(England) Bath
Lucas González Amorosino	Wing	2 November 1985 (aged 28)	33	Unattached
Juan Imhoff	Wing	11 May 1988 (aged 26)	20	(France) Racing Métro
Manuel Montero	Wing	20 November 1991 (aged 22)	13	(Argentina) Pucará
Santiago Cordero	Fullback	6 December 1993 (aged 20)	7	(Argentina) Regatas
Juan Martín Hernández	Fullback	7 August 1982 (aged 32)	44	Unattached
Joaquín Tuculet	Fullback	8 August 1989 (aged 25)	11	Unattached

=== Australia ===
Australia 32-man squad for the Championship was announced on 23 July.

Although Henry Speight has been named in the squad, he is not eligible to play for the Wallabies until September 11, after round three of the Championship.

On 30 July, Peter Betham was called up to the squad as cover for Henry Speight, who was ruled out with a hamstring injury.

On 5 August, Tolu Latu and Laurie Weeks were called up to the squad as cover for Tatafu Polota-Nau, who was ruled out of the opening match with a ligament injury, and Scott Sio who was ruled out with an ankle injury.

On 10 August, Tom English and Paddy Ryan were called up to the squad to cover Joe Tomane and Laurie Weeks who both suffered hamstring injuries in training, thus being ruled out of the start of the Championship.

On 11 August, Saia Fainga'a was called up to the squad to replace Tolu Latu who was withdrawn from the squad due to a broken arm.

On 27 August, Kyle Godwin was called up to the squad to replace Pat McCabe who was withdrawn from the squad due to a retirement enforced injury.

On 4 September, Josh Mann-Rea was called up to the squad as cover for Saia Fainga'a, who potentially would have to leave the squad for the birth of his child during the week leading up to Round 3. Although Mann-Rea remained in the squad for Round's 5 and 6 with Polota-Nau withdrawing from the squad due to injury.

On 7 September, Will Genia and Benn Robinson was added to the squad as training cover for their respective positions. Although they remained in the squad for Round's 5 and 6 as a full squad member.

On 8 September, Jake Schatz was added to the squad as cover for Wycliff Palu who was ruled out of Round 4.

Player	Position	Date of birth (age)	Caps	Club/province
Nathan Charles	Hooker	9 January 1989 (aged 25)	2	Force
Saia Fainga'a	Hooker	2 February 1987 (aged 27)	29	Reds
James Hanson	Hooker	15 September 1988 (aged 25)	1	Reds
Tolu Latu	Hooker	23 February 1993 (aged 21)	0	Waratahs
Joshua Mann-Rea	Hooker	19 February 1981 (aged 33)	0	Brumbies
Tatafu Polota-Nau	Hooker	26 July 1985 (aged 29)	49	Waratahs
Ben Alexander	Prop	13 November 1984 (aged 29)	62	Brumbies
Pekahou Cowan	Prop	2 June 1986 (aged 28)	7	Force
Sekope Kepu	Prop	5 February 1986 (aged 28)	41	Waratahs
Benn Robinson	Prop	19 July 1984 (aged 30)	66	Waratahs
Paddy Ryan	Prop	9 August 1988 (aged 26)	3	Waratahs
Scott Sio	Prop	16 October 1991 (aged 22)	5	Brumbies
James Slipper (vc)	Prop	6 June 1989 (aged 25)	52	Reds
Laurie Weeks	Prop	5 April 1986 (aged 28)	2	Rebels
Sam Carter	Lock	10 September 1989 (aged 24)	1	Brumbies
James Horwill	Lock	29 May 1985 (aged 29)	51	Reds
Rob Simmons	Lock	19 April 1989 (aged 25)	40	Reds
Will Skelton	Lock	3 May 1992 (aged 22)	1	Waratahs
Scott Fardy	Flanker	5 July 1984 (aged 30)	13	Brumbies
Matt Hodgson	Flanker	25 June 1981 (aged 33)	6	Force
Michael Hooper (c)	Flanker	29 October 1991 (aged 22)	31	Waratahs
Scott Higginbotham	Number 8	5 September 1986 (aged 27)	24	Rebels
Ben McCalman	Number 8	18 March 1988 (aged 26)	32	Force
Wycliff Palu	Number 8	27 July 1982 (aged 32)	51	Waratahs
Jake Schatz	Number 8	25 July 1990 (aged 24)	0	Reds
Luke Burgess	Scrum-half	20 August 1983 (aged 30)	37	Rebels
Will Genia	Scrum-half	17 January 1988 (aged 26)	55	Reds
Nick Phipps	Scrum-half	9 January 1989 (aged 25)	17	Waratahs
Nic White	Scrum-half	13 June 1990 (aged 24)	13	Brumbies
Kurtley Beale	Fly-half	6 January 1989 (aged 25)	42	Waratahs
Bernard Foley	Fly-half	8 September 1989 (aged 24)	7	Waratahs
Kyle Godwin	Centre	30 July 1992 (aged 22)	0	Force
Tevita Kuridrani	Centre	31 March 1991 (aged 23)	11	Brumbies
Christian Lealiifano	Centre	24 September 1987 (aged 26)	13	Brumbies
Pat McCabe	Centre	21 March 1988 (aged 26)	22	Brumbies
Matt To'omua	Centre	2 January 1990 (aged 24)	13	Brumbies
Adam Ashley-Cooper (vc)	Wing	27 March 1984 (aged 30)	94	Waratahs
Peter Betham	Wing	6 January 1989 (aged 25)	1	Waratahs
Tom English	Wing	8 March 1991 (aged 23)	0	Rebels
Rob Horne	Wing	4 September 1989 (aged 24)	16	Waratahs
Henry Speight	Wing	24 March 1988 (aged 26)	0	Brumbies
Joe Tomane	Wing	2 February 1990 (aged 24)	9	Brumbies
Israel Folau	Fullback	3 April 1989 (aged 25)	18	Waratahs

=== New Zealand ===
New Zealand 31-man squad for the Championship was announced on 28 July.

On 6 August, Colin Slade was added to the squad as cover for Dan Carter, who will miss the opening two matches of the Championship.

Joe Moody was also named in the squad as an injury replacement for Tony Woodcock who was initially meant to miss the start of the Championship. However, on 8 August he was ruled out of the whole Championship with Moody replacing Woodcock fully in the squad. Jeremy Thrush was also added to the squad on 8 August, to cover Dominic Bird who will miss the opening two matches due to injury.

On 15 August, Ryan Crotty was added to the squad to cover Conrad Smith who returned to New Zealand pre-round 1 due to the birth of his child.

On 16 September, Nathan Harris was added to the squad for Round's 5 and 6 as cover in his position.

On 22 September, Tom Taylor was added to the squad to replace Aaron Cruden who was withdrawn from the squad as a disciplinary action.

Player	Position	Date of birth (age)	Caps	Club/province
Dane Coles	Hooker	10 December 1986 (aged 27)	18	Wellington / Hurricanes
Nathan Harris	Hooker	8 March 1990 (aged 24)	0	Bay of Plenty / Chiefs
Keven Mealamu	Hooker	20 March 1979 (aged 35)	113	Auckland / Blues
Wyatt Crockett	Prop	24 January 1983 (aged 31)	27	Canterbury / Crusaders
Charlie Faumuina	Prop	24 December 1986 (aged 27)	20	Auckland / Blues
Ben Franks	Prop	27 March 1984 (aged 30)	31	Hawke's Bay / Hurricanes
Owen Franks	Prop	23 December 1987 (aged 26)	57	Canterbury / Crusaders
Joe Moody	Prop	18 September 1988 (aged 25)	0	Canterbury / Crusaders
Tony Woodcock	Prop	27 January 1981 (aged 33)	110	North Harbour / Blues
Dominic Bird	Lock	9 April 1991 (aged 23)	1	Canterbury / Crusaders
Brodie Retallick	Lock	31 May 1991 (aged 23)	27	Bay of Plenty / Chiefs
Jeremy Thrush	Lock	19 April 1985 (aged 29)	5	Wellington / Hurricanes
Patrick Tuipulotu	Lock	23 January 1993 (aged 21)	2	Auckland / Blues
Sam Whitelock	Lock	12 October 1988 (aged 25)	54	Canterbury / Crusaders
Sam Cane	Flanker	13 January 1992 (aged 22)	14	Bay of Plenty / Chiefs
Steve Luatua	Flanker	29 April 1991 (aged 23)	11	Auckland / Blues
Richie McCaw (c)	Flanker	31 December 1980 (aged 33)	127	Canterbury / Crusaders
Liam Messam	Flanker	25 March 1984 (aged 30)	32	Waikato / Chiefs
Jerome Kaino	Number 8	6 April 1983 (aged 31)	51	Auckland / Blues
Kieran Read	Number 8	26 October 1985 (aged 28)	62	Canterbury / Crusaders
Tawera Kerr-Barlow	Half-back	15 August 1990 (aged 24)	14	Waikato / Chiefs
TJ Perenara	Half-back	23 January 1992 (aged 22)	3	Wellington / Hurricanes
Aaron Smith	Half-back	21 November 1988 (aged 25)	29	Manawatu / Highlanders
Beauden Barrett	First five-eighth	27 May 1991 (aged 23)	19	Taranaki / Hurricanes
Dan Carter	First five-eighth	5 March 1982 (aged 32)	100	Canterbury / Crusaders
Aaron Cruden	First five-eighth	8 January 1989 (aged 25)	32	Manawatu / Chiefs
James Deslauriers	First five-eighth	29 January 1991 (aged 23)	11	Canterbury / Crusaders
Tom Taylor	First five-eighth	11 March 1989 (aged 25)	3	Canterbury / Crusaders
Ryan Crotty	Centre	23 September 1988 (aged 25)	6	Canterbury / Crusaders
Malakai Fekitoa	Centre	10 May 1992 (aged 22)	2	Auckland / Highlanders
Ma'a Nonu	Centre	21 May 1982 (aged 32)	91	Wellington / Blues
Conrad Smith	Centre	12 October 1981 (aged 32)	77	Wellington / Hurricanes
Cory Jane	Wing	8 February 1983 (aged 31)	48	Wellington / Hurricanes
Julian Savea	Wing	7 August 1990 (aged 24)	22	Wellington / Hurricanes
Ben Smith	Wing	1 June 1986 (aged 28)	29	Otago / Highlanders
Israel Dagg	Fullback	6 June 1988 (aged 26)	39	Hawke's Bay / Crusaders
Charles Piutau	Fullback	31 October 1991 (aged 22)	10	Auckland / Blues

=== South Africa ===
South Africa 30-man squad for the Championship was announced on 2 August.

On 6 August, Juan Smith was called up to the squad to cover Victor Matfield who has been ruled out of the opening match of the championship.

On 16 August, Warren Whiteley was added to the squad as cover for Willem Alberts, who was ruled out of Round 2 with a hamstring injury.

On 25 August, Marcel van der Merwe was added to the squad to replace Frans Malherbe who was withdrawn from the squad prior to Round 3 due to an injury.

On 14 September, JP Pietersen was added to the squad for the final two matches of the Championship.

On 17 September, Schalk Burger was added to the squad to replace Francois Louw who withdrew from the squad for Round's 5 and 6 due to injury.

Note: Flags indicate national union for the club/province as defined by World Rugby.

Player	Position	Date of birth (age)	Caps	Club/province
Schalk Brits	Hooker	16 May 1981 (aged 33)	7	(England) Saracens
Bismarck du Plessis ‡	Hooker	22 May 1984 (aged 30)	60	(South Africa) Sharks
Adriaan Strauss	Hooker	18 November 1985 (aged 28)	34	(South Africa) Free State Cheetahs
Jannie du Plessis ‡	Prop	16 November 1982 (aged 31)	54	(South Africa) Sharks
Frans Malherbe	Prop	14 March 1991 (aged 23)	2	(South Africa) Western Province
Tendai Mtawarira ‡	Prop	1 August 1985 (aged 29)	55	(South Africa) Sharks
Trevor Nyakane	Prop	4 May 1989 (aged 25)	4	(South Africa) Free State Cheetahs
Gurthrö Steenkamp	Prop	12 June 1981 (aged 33)	51	(France) Toulouse
Marcel van der Merwe	Prop	24 October 1990 (aged 23)	1	(South Africa) Blue Bulls
Bakkies Botha	Lock	22 September 1979 (aged 34)	79	(France) Toulon
Lood de Jager	Lock	17 December 1992 (aged 21)	3	(South Africa) Free State Cheetahs
Eben Etzebeth ‡	Lock	29 October 1991 (aged 22)	23	(South Africa) Western Province
Victor Matfield	Lock	11 May 1977 (aged 37)	113	(South Africa) Blue Bulls
Juan Smith	Lock	30 July 1981 (aged 33)	69	(France) Toulon
Willem Alberts ‡	Flanker	11 May 1984 (aged 30)	32	(South Africa) Sharks
Schalk Burger	Flanker	13 April 1983 (aged 31)	71	(Japan) Suntory Sungoliath
Marcell Coetzee ‡	Flanker	8 May 1991 (aged 23)	16	(South Africa) Sharks
Francois Louw	Flanker	15 June 1985 (aged 29)	30	(England) Bath
Oupa Mohojé	Flanker	3 August 1990 (aged 24)	1	(South Africa) Free State Cheetahs
Duane Vermeulen ‡	Number 8	3 July 1986 (aged 28)	19	(South Africa) Western Province
Warren Whiteley ‡	Number 8	18 September 1987 (aged 26)	0	(South Africa) Golden Lions
Francois Hougaard ‡	Scrum-half	6 April 1988 (aged 26)	28	(South Africa) Blue Bulls
Ruan Pienaar	Scrum-half	10 March 1984 (aged 30)	76	(Republic of Ireland) Ulster
Cobus Reinach	Scrum-half	7 February 1990 (aged 24)	0	(South Africa) Sharks
Pat Lambie ‡	Fly-half	17 October 1990 (aged 23)	32	(South Africa) Sharks
Handré Pollard	Fly-half	11 March 1994 (aged 20)	1	(South Africa) Blue Bulls
Morné Steyn	Fly-half	11 July 1984 (aged 30)	56	(France) Stade Français
Damian de Allende	Centre	25 November 1991 (aged 22)	0	(South Africa) Western Province
Jean de Villiers (c) ‡	Centre	24 February 1981 (aged 33)	96	(South Africa) Western Province
JP Pietersen	Centre	12 July 1989 (aged 25)	54	(Japan) Panasonic Wild Knights
Jan Serfontein	Centre	15 April 1993 (aged 21)	12	(South Africa) Blue Bulls
Bryan Habana	Wing	12 June 1983 (aged 31)	97	(France) Toulon
Cornal Hendricks	Wing	18 April 1988 (aged 26)	3	(South Africa) Free State Cheetahs
Lwazi Mvovo	Wing	3 June 1986 (aged 28)	9	(South Africa) Sharks
Willie le Roux ‡	Fullback	18 August 1989 (aged 24)	15	(South Africa) Free State Cheetahs

‡ denotes players who are contracted to the South African Rugby Union.

== Statistics ==
=== Points scorers ===
Pos	Name	Team	Pts
1	Nicolás Sánchez	Argentina	52
2	Bernard Foley	Australia	43
2	Handré Pollard	South Africa	43
4	Aaron Cruden	New Zealand	37
5	Beauden Barrett	New Zealand	30
6	Morné Steyn	South Africa	28
7	Kurtley Beale	Australia	22
8	Julian Savea	New Zealand	20
9	Cornal Hendricks	South Africa	15
9	Michael Hooper	Australia	15
9	Richie McCaw	New Zealand	15
12	Pat Lambie	South Africa	13
13	Marcell Coetzee	South Africa	10
13	Israel Folau	Australia	10
13	Manuel Montero	Argentina	10
13	Ben Smith	New Zealand	10
13	Joaquín Tuculet	Argentina	10
13	Jean de Villiers	South Africa	10
19	Marcelo Bosch	Argentina	8
20	Aaron Smith	New Zealand	7
21	Horacio Agulla	Argentina	5
21	Adam Ashley-Cooper	Australia	5
21	Peter Betham	Australia	5
21	Dane Coles	New Zealand	5
21	Tomás Cubelli	Argentina	5
21	Israel Dagg	New Zealand	5
21	Malakai Fekitoa	New Zealand	5
21	Bryan Habana	South Africa	5
21	Scott Higginbotham	Australia	5
21	Rob Horne	Australia	5
21	Francois Hougaard	South Africa	5
21	Juan Imhoff	Argentina	5
21	Tevita Kuridrani	Australia	5
21	Steve Luatua	New Zealand	5
21	Liam Messam	New Zealand	5
21	TJ Perenara	New Zealand	5
21	Ruan Pienaar	South Africa	5
21	Kieran Read	New Zealand	5
21	Leonardo Senatore	Argentina	5
21	Colin Slade	New Zealand	5
42	Juan Martín Hernández	Argentina	3
43	Santiago González Iglesias	Argentina	2

=== Try scorers ===
Pos	Name	Team	Tries
1	Julian Savea	New Zealand	4
2	Cornal Hendricks	South Africa	3
2	Michael Hooper	Australia	3
2	Richie McCaw	New Zealand	3
5	Marcell Coetzee	South Africa	2
5	Israel Folau	Australia	2
5	Manuel Montero	Argentina	2
5	Handré Pollard	South Africa	2
5	Ben Smith	New Zealand	2
5	Joaquín Tuculet	Argentina	2
5	Jean de Villiers	South Africa	2
12	Horacio Agulla	Argentina	1
12	Adam Ashley-Cooper	Australia	1
12	Peter Betham	Australia	1
12	Marcelo Bosch	Argentina	1
12	Dane Coles	New Zealand	1
12	Tomás Cubelli	Argentina	1
12	Israel Dagg	New Zealand	1
12	Malakai Fekitoa	New Zealand	1
12	Bryan Habana	South Africa	1
12	Scott Higginbotham	Australia	1
12	Rob Horne	Australia	1
12	Francois Hougaard	South Africa	1
12	Juan Imhoff	Argentina	1
12	Tevita Kuridrani	Australia	1
12	Pat Lambie	South Africa	1
12	Steve Luatua	New Zealand	1
12	Liam Messam	New Zealand	1
12	TJ Perenara	New Zealand	1
12	Ruan Pienaar	South Africa	1
12	Kieran Read	New Zealand	1
12	Leonardo Senatore	Argentina	1
12	Aaron Smith	New Zealand	1

== See also ==
- History of rugby union matches between Argentina and Australia
- History of rugby union matches between Argentina and New Zealand
- History of rugby union matches between Argentina and South Africa
- History of rugby union matches between Australia and South Africa
- History of rugby union matches between Australia and New Zealand
- History of rugby union matches between New Zealand and South Africa
