= List of Jaguares (Super Rugby) players =

This is a list of rugby union footballers who have played for the Jaguares in Super Rugby. The list includes any player that has played in a regular season match, semi-final or final for the Jaguares, ordered by debut date and name. The Jaguares competed in the Super Rugby between 2016 and 2020.

== Players ==
No.	Name	Caps	Tries	C	P	DG	Points	Debut	Last
1	Rodrigo Báez	17	2				10	26/02/2016	14/07/2017
2	Emiliano Boffelli	54	21		4		117	26/02/2016	07/03/2020
3	Santiago Cordero	20	6				30	26/02/2016	14/07/2017
4	Agustín Creevy	59	16				80	26/02/2016	09/02/2020
5	Jerónimo de la Fuente	51	6				30	26/02/2016	07/03/2020
6	Ramiro Herrera	22						26/02/2016	14/07/2017
7	Martín Landajo	39	6				30	26/02/2016	15/03/2019
8	Tomás Lavanini	47	3				15	26/02/2016	06/07/2019
9	Pablo Matera	53	11				55	26/02/2016	06/07/2019
10	Matías Moroni	46	12				60	26/02/2016	07/03/2020
11	Lucas Noguera Paz	15						26/02/2016	14/07/2017
12	Guido Petti	68	5				25	26/02/2016	07/03/2020
13	Nicolás Sánchez	40	7	75	68	1	392	26/02/2016	21/07/2018
14	Leonardo Senatore	27	6				30	26/02/2016	04/05/2018
15	Joaquín Tuculet	46	10				50	26/02/2016	07/03/2020
16	Santiago González Iglesias	28	1	8	9		48	26/02/2016	15/06/2019
17	Matías Alemanno	46	4				20	26/02/2016	07/03/2020
18	Facundo Isa	13	4				20	26/02/2016	16/07/2016
19	Santiago García Botta	44	1				5	26/02/2016	15/03/2019
20	Nahuel Tetaz Chaparro	50						26/02/2016	07/03/2020
21	Matías Orlando	59	15				75	26/02/2016	02/02/2020
22	Julián Montoya	62	10				50	26/02/2016	07/03/2020
23	Gonzalo Bertranou	46	7				35	26/02/2016	07/03/2020
24	Lucas González Amorosino	9	1				5	05/03/2016	09/07/2016
25	Javier Ortega Desio	48	4				20	05/03/2016	16/02/2020
26	Felipe Arregui	18						05/03/2016	24/03/2018
27	Joaquín Paz	5						05/03/2016	23/04/2016
28	Juan Martín Hernández	19	2	11	9		59	19/03/2016	17/03/2018
29	Juan Manuel Leguizamón	32	1				5	19/03/2016	06/07/2019
30	Felipe Ezcurra	30	1				5	19/03/2016	16/02/2020
31	Roberto Tejerizo	8						19/03/2016	21/04/2017
32	Tomás Lezana	46	1				5	26/03/2016	07/03/2020
33	Enrique Pieretto	33						26/03/2016	06/07/2019
34	Manuel Montero	7	1				5	02/04/2016	13/05/2017
35	Ramiro Moyano	40	17				85	02/04/2016	06/07/2019
36	Facundo Bosch	6						02/04/2016	16/07/2016
37	Juan Cruz Guillemaín	3						02/04/2016	15/04/2016
38	Facundo Gigena	5						23/04/2016	27/05/2016
39	Segundo Tuculet	1						27/05/2016	27/05/2016
40	Ignacio Larrague	8						02/07/2016	14/07/2017
41	Marcos Kremer	52	4				20	09/07/2016	07/03/2020
42	Joaquín Díaz Bonilla	28		33	27		148	25/02/2017	07/03/2020
43	Cristian Bartoloni	3						25/02/2017	11/03/2017
44	Bautista Ezcurra	21	3	1			17	18/03/2017	15/03/2019
45	Benjamín Macome	6	1				5	15/04/2017	14/07/2017
46	Bautista Delguy	22	12				60	17/02/2018	22/02/2020
47	Javier Díaz	14						17/02/2018	16/02/2020
48	Juan Pablo Zeiss	16						17/02/2018	15/06/2019
49	Sebastián Cancelliere	24	9				45	03/03/2018	07/03/2020
50	Juan Cruz Mallía	16	1	2			9	04/05/2018	29/02/2020
51	Santiago Medrano	29	1				5	04/05/2018	07/03/2020
52	Diego Fortuny	1						30/06/2018	30/06/2018
53	Rodrigo Bruni	15	3				15	16/02/2019	07/03/2020
54	Mayco Vivas	23						16/02/2019	07/03/2020
55	Tomás Cubelli	21	3				15	23/02/2019	22/02/2020
56	Gaspar Baldunciel	3	1				5	09/03/2019	30/03/2019
57	Domingo Miotti	15	3	29	12		109	06/04/2019	07/03/2020
58	Santiago Carreras	12	5				25	13/04/2019	07/03/2020
59	Lucas Paulos	11						11/05/2019	07/03/2020
60	Lucio Sordoni	3						25/05/2019	16/02/2020
61	Francisco Gorrissen	7						08/06/2019	29/02/2020
62	Santiago Socino	5	2				10	15/06/2019	07/03/2020
63	Joel Sclavi	6						02/02/2020	07/03/2020
64	Santiago Chocobares	5						09/02/2020	07/03/2020
65	Tomás Albornoz	1		1			2	16/02/2020	16/02/2020
66	Juan Bautista Pedemonte	1						29/02/2020	29/02/2020
67	Santiago Grondona	1						07/03/2020	07/03/2020
