= Tuculet =

Tuculet is a surname. Notable people with the surname include:

- Joaquín Tuculet (born 1989), Argentine rugby union player
- Segundo Tuculet (born 1994), Argentine rugby union player
