= Juan Martín Fernández Lobbe =

Argentina international rugby union player

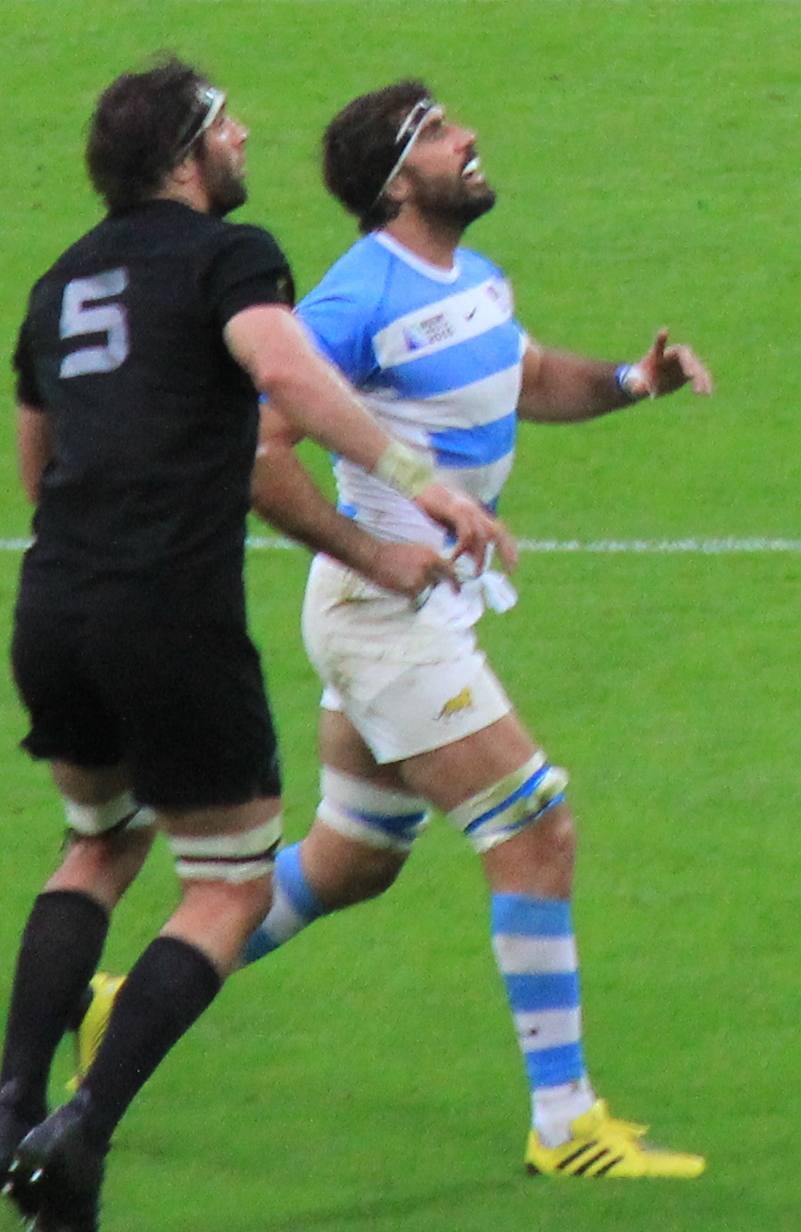
- Fernández Lobbe (centre) with Argentina in 2015
- Born: Juan Martín Fernández Lobbe; November 19, 1981 (age 44) Buenos Aires, Argentina
- Height: 1.93 m (6 ft 4 in)
- Weight: 108 kg (238 lb; 17 st 0 lb)
- Notable relative: Ignacio Fernández Lobbe (brother)

Rugby union career
- Position: Flanker or Number eight
Amateur team(s)
Years	Team	Apps	(Points)
2000-2004	Liceo Naval		
Senior career
Years	Team	Apps	(Points)
2006–2009	Sale Sharks	66	(80)
2009–2018	Toulon	205	(128)
- Correct as of 18 August 2015
International career
Years	Team	Apps	(Points)
2004–2015	Argentina	71	(25)
- Correct as of 30 October 2015
National sevens team
Years	Team		Comps
2004–05	Argentina		11
- Correct as of 24 September 2007

Juan Martín Fernández Lobbe (born 19 November 1981 in Buenos Aires) is an Argentine rugby union footballer. He played for Toulon in the French Top 14, having moved from Sale Sharks in England's Guinness Premiership. He previously played for Liceo Naval. He usually plays in the back row.

He made his debut for the Sale Sharks in 2006 against the Leicester Tigers. His debut season for the Sharks was the 2006–07 Guinness Premiership. He was Sale's first XV captain. He made his international debut for Argentina in 2004 against Uruguay. He was a part of the Pumas team that defeated Wales at home in a two Test series, scoring a try in one game.

Fernández Lobbe featured in the side that defeated England at Twickenham in November 2006 as well as back to back victories over Ireland the following year. He was an integral part of the Los Pumas team in their 2007 Rugby World Cup campaign, which succeeded in gaining Argentina's highest World Cup finish, third place. He played in every game en route to the semi-final, which they lost to the eventual champions of South Africa. He led his country for the first time in November 2008, a game which they lost at the hands of Ireland. However Fernández Lobbe retained the captaincy in the absence of Felipe Contepomi and defeated England in front of their home crowd in 2009.

He was part of the Argentine squad at the 2011 Rugby World Cup in New Zealand and 2015 Rugby World Cup in England.

He was the captain of the Pumas, a position he took over after succeeding Felipe Contepomi. As captain, he played every game of the 2012 Rugby Championship and four during the 2013 Rugby Championship. He also played in the 2014 and 2015 Rugby Championships.

He played at RC Toulon for nine seasons, between 2009 and 2018. Fernández Lobbe won the French Top 14 in 2014 and the Heineken Cup in 2013, 2014 and 2015 with Toulon.

== Honours ==
=== Toulon ===
- Top 14 Winner: 2013-2014
- Heineken Cup/European Rugby Champions Cup Winner: 2012–13, 2013–14, 2014–15

=== Argentina ===
- Rugby World Cup bronze medalist: 2007
