= Horacio Agulla =

Argentine rugby union player (born 1984)

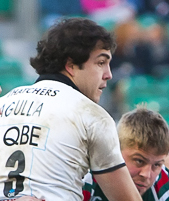
- Argentine rugby union player
- Born: Horacio Agulla; October 22, 1984 (age 42) Buenos Aires, Argentina
- Height: 1.81 m (5 ft 11 in)
- Weight: 92 kg (14 st 7 lb)
- Occupation: rugby player

Rugby union career
- Position(s): Wing, Fullback, Centre
Amateur team(s)
| Years | Team | Apps | (Points) |
| 2002–07 | Hindú Club | | |
- Correct as of September 7, 2007
Senior career
| Years | Team | Apps | (Points) |
| 2007–08 | Dax | 15 | (23) |
| 2008–10 | Brive | 37 | (33) |
| 2010–12 | Leicester Tigers | 47 | (40) |
| 2012–16 | Bath | 54 | (110) |
| 2016– | Castres Olympique | | |
- Correct as of 18 August 2015
International career
| Years | Team | Apps | (Points) |
| 2005 | Argentina U21 | 8 | (20) |
| 2006–07 | Argentina A | 8 | (15) |
| 2005–15 | Argentina | 63 | (30) |
- Correct as of 30 October 2015
National sevens team
| Years | Team | | Comps |
| 2006 | Argentina | | 4 |
- Correct as of September 24, 2007

Horacio Agulla (born October 22, 1984) is an Argentine rugby union player, who plays for Castres Olympique at club level. He plays as a wing or fullback.

Horacio attended St. Felipe The Apostle School in Don Torcuato, a suburb in The Province of Buenos Aires. Agulla made his debut for the national side on December 3, 2005, in a match against Samoa. He was part of the Argentine squad for the 2007 Rugby World Cup which succeed in gaining Argentina's highest world cup finish of third place and Argentine squad for the 2011 Rugby World Cup in New Zealand.

In 2008 he signed with Top 14's US Dax. He moved on to Brive in 2008. It was reported in early April 2010 (including on Sky Sports in the UK) that he had signed a contract to play for Leicester Tigers from the 2010/2011 season, joining his fellow Argentine internationals Marcos Ayerza and Lucas González Amorosino at Welford Road. In June 2012, he left Leicester and signed a contract with Bath Rugby.

Horacio was part of the Argentina squad that competes in the Rugby Championship.
