= Matías Cortese =

Argentine rugby union player

Matias Cortese
- Born: Matias Cortese; 1 October 1985 (age 41) Mendoza, Argentina
- Height: 1.83 m (6 ft 0 in)
- Weight: 107 kg (236 lb)

Rugby union career
- Position: Hooker
Senior career
Years	Team	Apps	(Points)
2006-2007	Northampton Saints	6	(5)
2007-2008	Biarritz Olympique	7	(0)
2008-2009	Bayonne	5	(0)
2009-2011	Pampas XV	9	(5)
2011-2012	Gloucester Rugby	11	(0)
2012-2013	US Colomiers	5	(0)
2013-2014	Liceo		
2014	Pampas XV		
- Correct as of 8 June 2014
International career
Years	Team	Apps	(Points)
2005-	Argentina	13	(0)
- Correct as of 17 November 2014

Matias Eduardo Cortese (born 1 October 1985 in Ampuero) is an Argentine rugby union player.

Cortese joined Northampton Saints in the Aviva Premiership for the 2006/07 season on a two-year contract. After his release, Cortese then spent seasons with French sides Biarritz Olympique and Bayonne, before he returned to Argentina to join Pampas XV where they won the 2011 Vodacom Cup.

On 24 May 2011, Cortese was signed by Gloucester Rugby for the 2011/12 season. On 22 June 2012, following his release from Gloucester, he signed for French club US Colomiers in the Pro D2, the second level of domestic rugby union in France.

Matias Cortese won his first cap with Argentina, where he made his international debut in 2005, as a replacement, against Samoa in an international friendly, losing 12–28. His other two test match appearances came in the 2010 South American Championship with Cortese playing against Chile and Uruguay. He was recalled to Argentina squad for the 2014 summer-test series held in June.
