= Cornal Hendricks =

South African rugby union player (1988–2025)

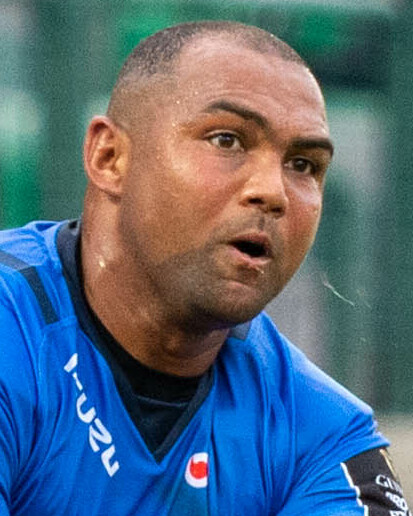
- Hendricks playing in 2021
- Born: 18 April 1988 Paarl, South Africa
- Died: 14 May 2025 (aged 37) Pretoria, South Africa
- Height: 1.88 m (6 ft 2 in)
- Weight: 95 kg (209 lb; 14 st 13 lb)
- School: Bergrivier High School, Wellington

Rugby union career
- Position: Wing/Inside centre
- Current team: Bulls / Blue Bulls
Youth career
- 2007–2008: Boland Cavaliers
Senior career
Years	Team	Apps	(Points)
2008–2012	Boland Cavaliers	68	(135)
2014–2015	Cheetahs	27	(55)
2014–2015	Free State Cheetahs	1	(0)
2019–2024	Bulls	72	(75)
2019	Blue Bulls XV	1	(5)
2019–2024	Blue Bulls	42	(90)
- Correct as of 23 July 2022
International career
Years	Team	Apps	(Points)
2012–2014	South Africa Sevens		
2012	South African Barbarians (South)	1	(0)
2014–2015	South Africa	12	(25)
2014	Springbok XV	1	(0)
- Correct as of 25 July 2015
Medal record
Men's rugby sevens
Representing South Africa
World Games
Gold medal – first place	2013 Cali	Team competition
Commonwealth Games
Gold medal – first place	2014 Glasgow	Team competition

Cornal Hendricks (18 April 1988 – 14 May 2025) was a South African rugby union player for the Bulls in Super Rugby, the Blue Bulls in the Currie Cup and the Blue Bulls XV in the Rugby Challenge. His regular position was wing. He died on 14 May 2025 of a suspected heart attack.

Hendricks was born in Paarl and died of a heart attack on 14 May 2025.

== Background ==
Hendricks died of heart attack on 14 May 2025, at the age of 37. He was married to Stephaney, and they had two children

== Career ==
=== Boland Cavaliers ===
Hendricks represented local team Boland Cavaliers through various underage competitions and graduated to the first team.

Hendricks made his first team debut for Boland against the Free State Cheetahs in the 2008 Currie Cup Premier Division season. He remained a first team regular for them over the next five seasons.

=== Cheetahs / Free State Cheetahs ===
Hendricks signed a contract with the Cheetahs to join them for the 2014 season, having previously agreed a deal with them for 2013, but failed to play for them in 2013 due to his South Africa Sevens commitments.

Hendricks was included in the Cheetahs squad for the 2014 Super Rugby season and made his debut – also scoring a try – in a 21–20 defeat to the Lions in Bloemfontein.

=== Stormers / Western Province ===
Hendricks returned to the Western Cape for the 2016 season, signing a two-year deal with Western Province and the Stormers. However, he was diagnosed with a serious heart condition and failed to make any appearances for them.

=== Toulon ===
In December 2016, French Top 14 side Toulon announced the signing of Hendricks until the end of the 2016–17 season. However, a few weeks after announcing this deal, Toulon stated that he would not join the team after all.

=== Representative rugby ===
Hendricks was also a member of the South Africa Sevens team during the 2011–12 and 2012–13 IRB Sevens World Series. In 2013, he was included in the squad for the 2013 Rugby World Cup Sevens.

In May 2014, Hendricks was one of eight uncapped players that were called up to a Springbok training camp prior to the 2014 mid-year rugby union tests.

Hendricks made his debut on 14 June 2014 for the Springboks against Wales in Durban.

== Honours ==
- Currie Cup Player of the Year (2020–21)
- Pro14 Rainbow Cup runner-up 2021
- Currie Cup winner 2020–21, 2021
- United Rugby Championship runner-up 2021–22

== Springbok statistics ==
=== Test Match Record ===
Against	Pld	W	D	L	Tri	Con	Pen	DG	Pts	%Won
Argentina	2	2	0	0	1	0	0	0	5	100
Australia	2	1	0	1	1	0	0	0	5	50
Ireland	1	0	0	1	0	0	0	0	0	0
New Zealand	2	1	0	1	1	0	0	0	5	50
Scotland	1	1	0	0	0	0	0	0	0	100
Wales	3	2	0	1	2	0	0	0	10	66.67
Total	11	7	0	4	5	0	0	0	25	63.64

Pld = Games Played, W = Games Won, D = Games Drawn, L = Games Lost, Tri = Tries Scored, Con = Conversions, Pen = Penalties, DG = Drop Goals, Pts = Points Scored

=== International Tries ===
Try	Opposing team	Location	Venue	Competition	Date	Result
1	Wales	Durban, South Africa	Kings Park	Mid-year rugby test series	14 June 2014	Won 38-16
2	Wales	Nelspruit, South Africa	Mbombela Stadium	Mid-year rugby test series	21 June 2014	Won 31-30
3	Argentina	Salta, Argentina	Estadio Padre Ernesto Martearena	2014 Rugby Championship	23 August 2014	Won 33-31
4	Australia	Perth, Australia	Patersons Stadium	2014 Rugby Championship	6 September 2014	Lost 23-24
5	New Zealand	Wellington, New Zealand	Westpac Stadium	2014 Rugby Championship	13 September 2014	Lost 10-14
