= Ignacio Fernández Lobbe =

Argentine rugby union player

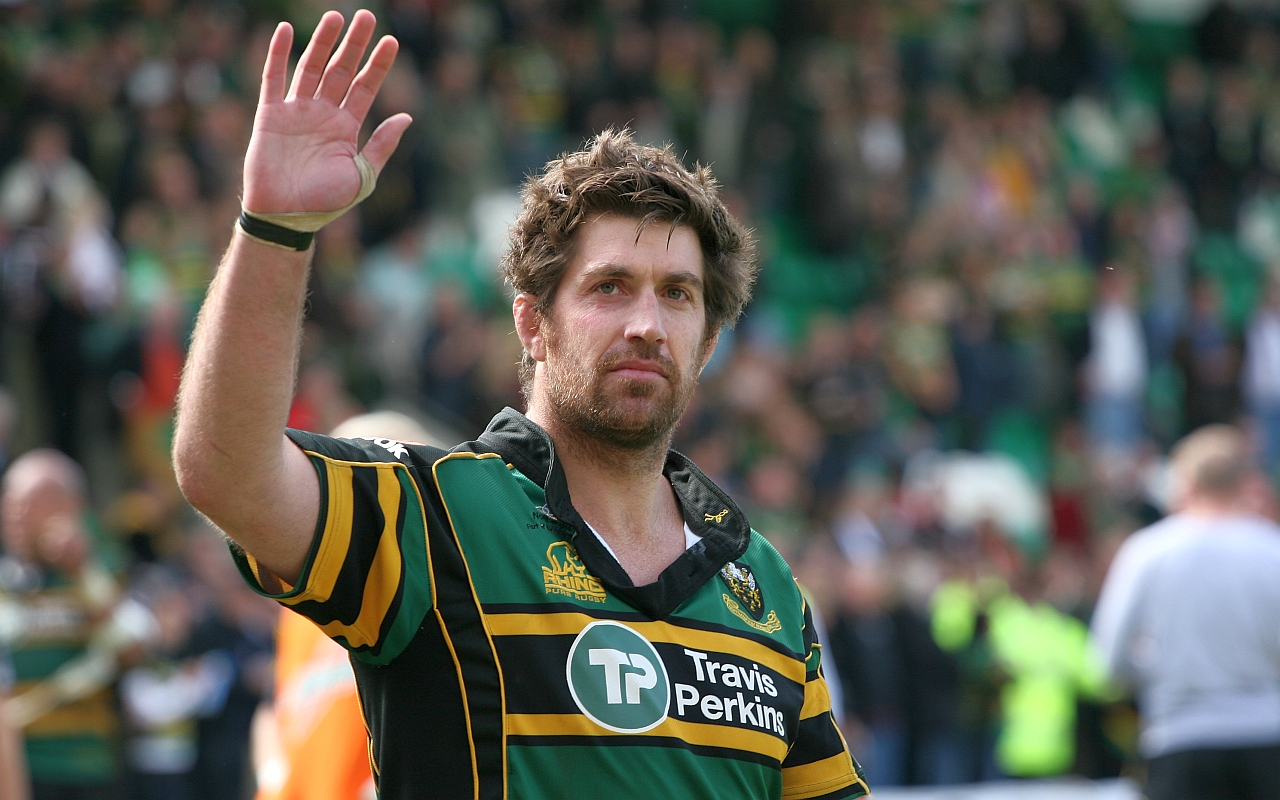
- Born: Carlos Ignacio Fernández Lobbe; November 20, 1974 (age 51) Buenos Aires, Argentina
- Height: 1.96 m (6 ft 5 in)
- Weight: 111 kg (17 st 7 lb)
- Notable relative: Juan Martín Fernández Lobbe (brother)

Rugby union career
- Position: Lock
Senior career
Years	Team	Apps	(Points)
−2000	Liceo Naval		
2000–2001	Bordeaux		
2001–2004	Castres	56	(30)
2005–2008	Sale Sharks	32	(15)
2008–2010	Northampton Saints	35	(0)
2010–2011	Bath	17	(5)
International career
Years	Team	Apps	(Points)
1996–2008	Argentina	65	(30)
National sevens team
Years	Team		Comps
1996–2000	Argentina		2

Carlos Ignacio Fernández Lobbe (born 20 November 1974 in Buenos Aires) is an Argentine rugby union coach and former player. He last played with English side, Bath Rugby in the Aviva Premiership. He has also represented Argentina on numerous occasions, including at the 1999, 2003 and 2007 Rugby World Cups.

He previously played for Sale Sharks, Castres, Bordeaux and the Liceo Naval club, moving to Northampton Saints for the 2008–09 season, where he made his debut against Worcester Warriors. In the 2005–2006 season, Lobbe started the final as Sale Sharks won their first ever Premiership title.

He captained Northampton Saints during the 2008–09 season while club captain Bruce Reihana was out injured.

In September 2010, it was announced that Fernández Lobbe would come out of retirement to join Bath as injury cover for the remainder of the 2010–11 season.
