= Lucas Noguera Paz =

Argentine rugby union player (born 1993)

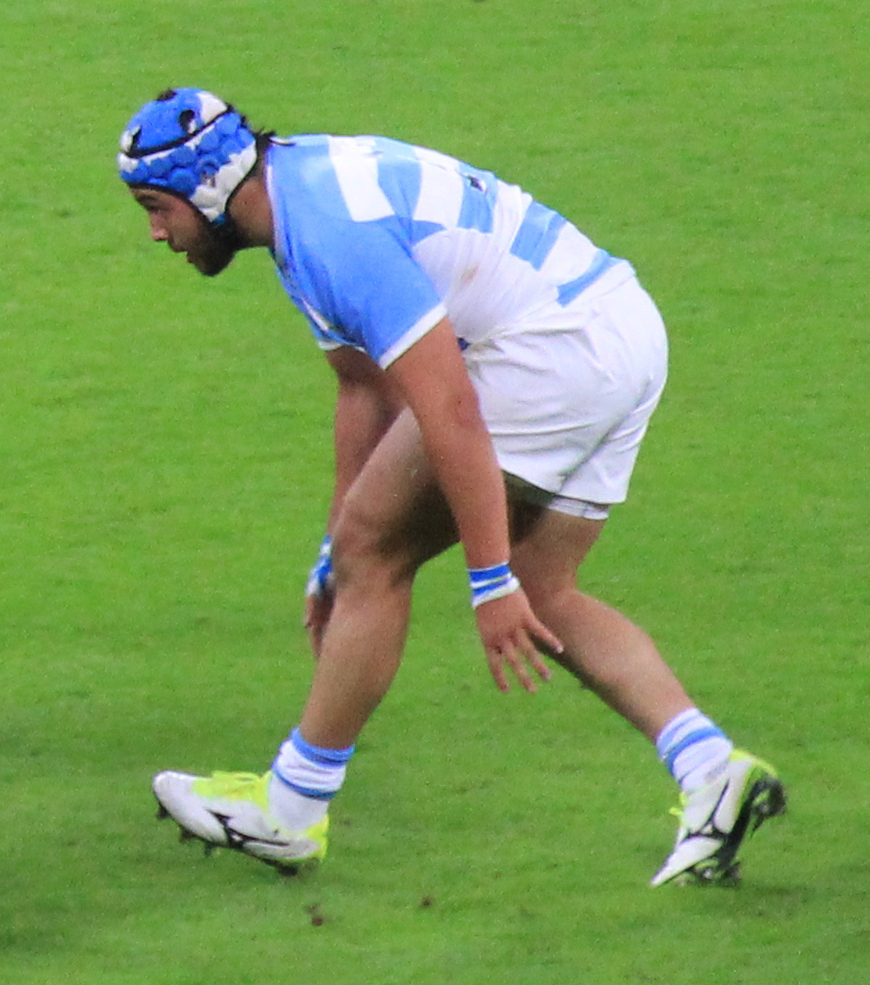
- Full name: Lucas Noguera Paz
- Born: 5 October 1993 (age 33) San Miguel de Tucumán, Argentina
- Height: 1.79 m (5 ft 10 in)
- Weight: 108 kg (17 st 0 lb; 238 lb)

Rugby union career
- Position: Loosehead Prop
Senior career
Years	Team	Apps	(Points)
2013–2014	Lince R.C.		
2014–2015	Pampas XV	8	(0)
2016−2017	Jaguares	1	(0)
2017–2020	Bath	22	(0)
2019–2019	Yorkshire Carnegie	1	(0)
- Correct as of 2 June 2019
International career
Years	Team	Apps	(Points)
2012	Argentina Under-19	3	(5)
2013	Argentina Under-20	8	(5)
2014–2020	Argentina	43	(10)
- Correct as of 2 June 2019

Lucas Noguera Paz (born 5 October 1993) is an Argentine rugby union footballer who recently played as a loosehead prop for Bath in Premiership Rugby and for Argentina.

Noguera Paz was a member of the Argentina Under-20 side which competed in the 2013 IRB Junior World Championship in France. He went on to represent the Pampas XV on their 2014 tour of Australia and made his senior international debut later in the year against Uruguay where he also managed a debut try. He featured against Chile the following week and played all 3 of his country's games during the 2014 mid-year rugby union internationals series. In August 2014, he was named in the Pumas squad for the 2014 Rugby Championship.
