= Mariano Galarza =

Argentine rugby union player

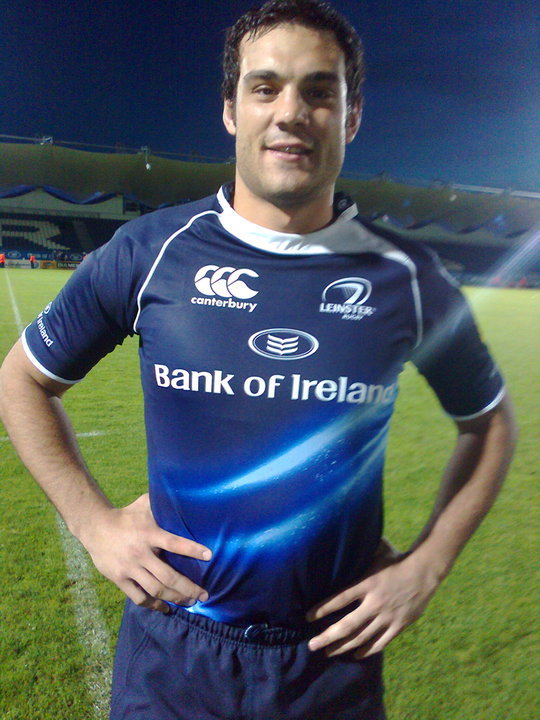
- Galarza in 2010
- Born: Mariano Galarza; November 12, 1986 (age 40) 25 de Mayo, Buenos Aires, Argentina
- Height: 2.03 m (6 ft 8 in)
- Weight: 115 kg (254 lb)

Rugby union career
- Position: Lock
- Current team: Bayonne
Amateur team(s)
Years	Team	Apps	(Points)
- Club Universitario de La Plata
Senior career
Years	Team	Apps	(Points)
2010–2013	Pampas XV	27	(15)
2010	Leinster	4	(0)
2013–2014	Worcester Warriors	21	(15)
2014–2018	Gloucester	61	(0)
2018–2019	Bordeaux	20	(0)
2019–2022	Bayonne	25	(0)
- Correct as of 20 December 2020
International career
Years	Team	Apps	(Points)
2009–2012	Argentina Jaguars	11	(0)
2010–2015	Argentina	26	(0)
- Correct as of 20 December 2020

Mariano Galarza (born November 12, 1986, in 25 de Mayo, Buenos Aires) is an Argentine rugby union player. He plays lock for French Top 14 club Bayonne. His former clubs have included Universitarios de La Plata, in Argentina, Leinster and Worcester. Galarza, a student of medicine, was selected to Los Pumas squad for the 2008 end of year tour to Europe. He debuted for the Argentine national team in 2010 and participated in the 2011 Rugby World Cup.

He signed a deal with Leinster at the start of the 2010–11 season and made his Celtic League debut against Glasgow Warriors in September 2010. After just four caps he left Leinster in February 2011 to play for Argentine side Pampas XV in the Vodacom Cup.

In 2013, he signed with English team Worcester Warriors. On 5 February 2014, Galarza was signed by local rivals Gloucester Rugby, which would see him leave Warriors at the end of the 2013–14 season.

On 4 October 2018, Galarza left Gloucester with immediate effect to join French side Bordeaux in the Top 14 for 2018–19 season. Afterwards, Galarza signed for Top 14 rivals Bayonne from the 2019–20 season.
