= Ramiro Herrera =

Argentine rugby union player (born 1989)

- Full name: Ramiro Herrera
- Born: 14 February 1989 (age 37) Comodoro Rivadavia, Argentina
- Height: 1.91 m (6 ft 3 in)
- Weight: 130 kg (20 st 7 lb; 287 lb)

Rugby union career
- Position: Prop
- Current team: Hindú
Amateur team(s)
| Years | Team | Apps | (Points) |
| 2009–13 | Hindú | 69 | (20) |
| 2015- | Hindú | | |
Senior career
| Years | Team | Apps | (Points) |
| 2013 | Pampas XV | 6 | (0) |
| 2014–15 | Castres | 22 | (0) |
| 2016−2017 | Jaguares | 11 | (0) |
| 2017-2019 | Stade Français | 27 | (5) |
- Correct as of 22 July 2016
International career
| Years | Team | Apps | (Points) |
| 2012–13 | Argentina Jaguars | 6 | (0) |
| 2014– | Argentina | 39 | (0) |
- Correct as of 6 October 2018

Ramiro Herrera (born 14 February 1989) is an Argentine rugby union footballer who plays as a prop for Jaguares in Super Rugby.

== Career ==
Herrera started out his rugby career in his native Argentina playing for Chenque Rugby Club from Comodoro Rivadavia.

Then he played for Hindú Club in the Torneo de la URBA for four years before trying his luck abroad with French side Castres Olympique.

He was also selected for the Pampas XV squad for the 2013 Vodacom Cup also for their tour of Australia in 2014.

== International career ==
Having played for Argentine representative sides such as the Pampas XV and the Jaguars, Herrera made his senior debut for Los Pumas against Ireland on 7 June 2014 and made a second appearance in the second test between the sides a week later. He didn't feature in Argentina's final game of the 2014 mid-year rugby union internationals against Scotland, however he was named in the squad for the 2014 Rugby Championship.
