= Rodrigo Báez (rugby union) =

Argentine rugby union footballer

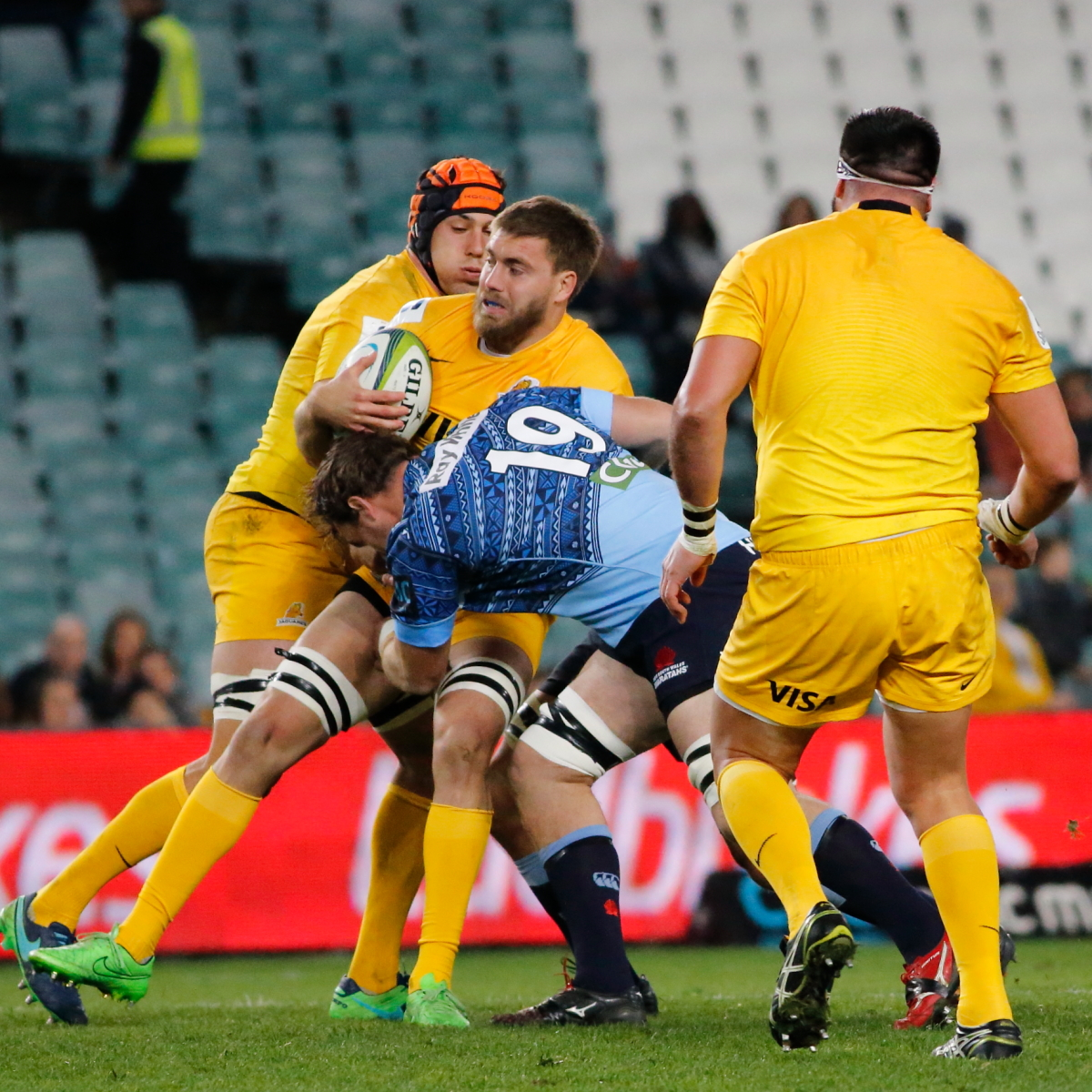
- Full name: Rodrigo Báez
- Born: 8 February 1989 (age 37) Mendoza, Argentina
- Height: 1.91 m (6 ft 3 in)
- Weight: 102 kg (16 st 1 lb; 225 lb)

Rugby union career
- Position: Loose forward
- Current team: Liceo Rugby Club
Senior career
| Years | Team | Apps | (Points) |
| 2009–2018 | Liceo Rugby Club | | |
| 2012–15 | Pampas XV | 16 | (5) |
| 2016−2017 | Jaguares | 6 | (5) |
- Correct as of 8 August 2024
International career
| Years | Team | Apps | (Points) |
| 2008 | Argentina Under-19 | 3 | (10) |
| 2009 | Argentina Under-20 | 4 | (0) |
| 2009–10 | Argentina Jaguars | 6 | (5) |
| 2011–2017 | Argentina | 17 | (10) |
- Correct as of 8 August 2024

Rodrigo Báez (born 8 February 1989) is an Argentine rugby union footballer who played as a loose forward for Liceo Rugby Club, the Argentine Super Rugby side Jaguares, and the Argentina national rugby union team.

== International career ==
Báez came through Argentina's youth structures, representing the Pumas Under 19 team in 2008 and the Under 20 side a year later at the 2009 IRB Junior World Championship. He later went on to turn out for the Argentina Jaguars and was a member of the Pampas XV team that competed in the 2012 and 2013 Vodacom Cup competitions in South Africa, as well as their tour of Australia in 2014.

He debuted for Los Pumas in May 2011 against Chile and capped his debut with a try in a comfortable victory for his side.

In August 2014, he was named to the squad for the 2014 Rugby Championship and made his first championship appearance as a substitute in a 9–28 loss to New Zealand on 6 September 2014.

Báez is signed to play for Jaguares until 2017.
