= Benjamín Macome =

Argentine rugby union player (born 1986)

- Full name: Benjamín Macome
- Born: 10 January 1986 (age 40) Tucumán, Argentina
- Height: 1.90 m (6 ft 3 in)
- Weight: 109 kg (17 st 2 lb; 240 lb)

Rugby union career
- Position: Flanker / Number Eight
- Current team: Jaguares
Amateur team(s)
Years	Team	Apps	(Points)
- Tucumán RC
Senior career
Years	Team	Apps	(Points)
2010–2013	Pampas XV	18	(15)
2013–2014	Stade Français	6	(0)
2014-2016	Bayonne	24	(15)
2017–present	Jaguares	0	(0)
- Correct as of 10 January 2015
International career
Years	Team	Apps	(Points)
2005	Argentina U19	8	(10)
2006–07	Argentina U20	10	(35)
2009–12	Argentina Jaguars	12	(5)
2009–present	Argentina	28	(10)
- Correct as of 18 November 2017

Benjamín Macome (born 10 January 1986) is an Argentine rugby union footballer. He plays as a flanker for the Jaguares in Super Rugby.

He plays for Tucumán Rugby in his homeland and the Pampas XV in the South African Vodacom Cup.

== International career ==
Macome made his senior debut for Los Pumas in the 89–6 win over Chile on 20 May 2009.

He was named in the squad for the 2013 Rugby Championship and made his championship debut as a 60th-minute substitute in his side's 17–22 defeat to South Africa on 24 August.
