= Club Liceo Naval =

Argentine sports club

Liceo Naval
- Full name: Centro de Graduados del Liceo Naval Militar
- Founded: 26 April 1953; 72 years ago
- Ground: Av. Cantilo, Núñez
- Location: Buenos Aires, Argentina
- League(s): Metropolitano (Field hockey)
- Affiliations: URBA (Rugby); AHBA (Hockey)
- Activities: List: Field hockey; Football; Rugby union; Rowing; Tennis
- President: Eduardo Zabalza
- Colors
- Website: cglnm.com.ar

Centro de Gradudados del Liceo Naval Militar, or simply Club Liceo Naval, is an Argentine sports club formed by graduates from Liceo Naval "Almirante Brown" (Admiral Brown Naval Military Academy), one of the two educative institutions of the Argentine Navy.

The Liceo Naval's senior rugby union team competes in Primera División B, the third division of the URBA league system, while the women's field hockey team plays in the Torneo Metropolitano, the main competition within Buenos Aires Province metropolitan area organised by the AHBA.

Other sports practised at Liceo Naval are football, rowing, and tennis.

== Overview ==
The Liceo Naval Militar "Almirante Brown" (named after Irish-Argentine admiral William Brown) opened in 1947 as a high school in the city of Ensenada, Buenos Aires in Buenos Aires Province. Six years later, a sports club named "Centro De Graduados Del Liceo Naval Militar" was established by Liceo Militar alumni in a small room located on Anchorena street in Buenos Aires.

== Facilities ==
Club headquarters and fields are located in the Núñez neighborhood of Buenos Aires, close to the Ciudad Universitaria.

== Notable athletes ==
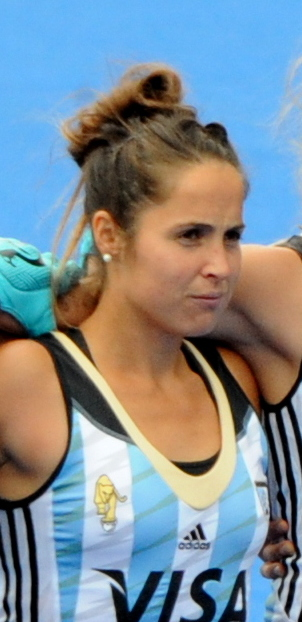
Rocío Sánchez Moccia, a Lioness that started her career at Liceo Naval

- Rocío Sánchez Moccia (field hockey), also played for the Argentina national team
- Eduardo Simone, Ignacio Fernández Lobbe and Juan Martín Fernández Lobbe (rugby), also players of the Argentina national team
- Nicolas Fernández Lobbe and Santiago Craig (rugby), also for Argentina 7s
- Santiago Fiocca, Sebastián Buffa, Nicolás Azzorín, Guido Lofiego, and Nacho Calles (rugby), also for youth national teams
- Santiago Gilligan (rugby), also for Argentina XV
- Diego Acuña (rugby), also for Pampas

== Club image ==
=== Uniforms ===
Rugby, Hockey	Football

== Honours ==
- URBA 7s championship: 2013
