= Santiago González Iglesias =

Argentine rugby union player (born 1988)

- Full name: Santiago González Iglesias
- Born: 16 June 1988 (age 38) Buenos Aires, Argentina
- Height: 1.79 m (5 ft 10 in)
- Weight: 87 kg (13 st 10 lb; 192 lb)

Rugby union career
- Position: Fly-Half / Inside-Centre
- Current team: Asociación Alumni/Jaguares
Senior career
Years	Team	Apps	(Points)
2009–14	Asociación Alumni	59	(738)
2010–15	Pampas XV	26	(205)
2016−19	Jaguares	27	(42)
2020	Munakata Sanix Blues	3	(13)
2021−	San Diego Legion		
- Correct as of 15 April 2017
International career
Years	Team	Apps	(Points)
2009-	Argentina	43	(143)
- Correct as of 6 October 2018

Santiago González Iglesias (born 16 June 1988 in Buenos Aires) is an Argentine rugby union player who plays as a fly-half for the San Diego Legion of Major League Rugby (MLR). He also plays for Asociación Alumni.

Iglesias was also a member of Pampas XV.

He has 46 caps for Argentina, since his debut in the 89–6 win over Chile, at 20 May 2009, in Montevideo, for the South American Rugby Championship, Division 1. He has scored 7 tries, 36 conversions and 12 penalties, in an aggregate of 143 points. He was a regular player and captain for Argentina Jaguars.

Santiago was part of the national team that competed at the 2015 Rugby World Cup.

González Iglesias is signed to play for Jaguares in Super Rugby until 2017.
