= Martín Landajo =

Argentine rugby union player

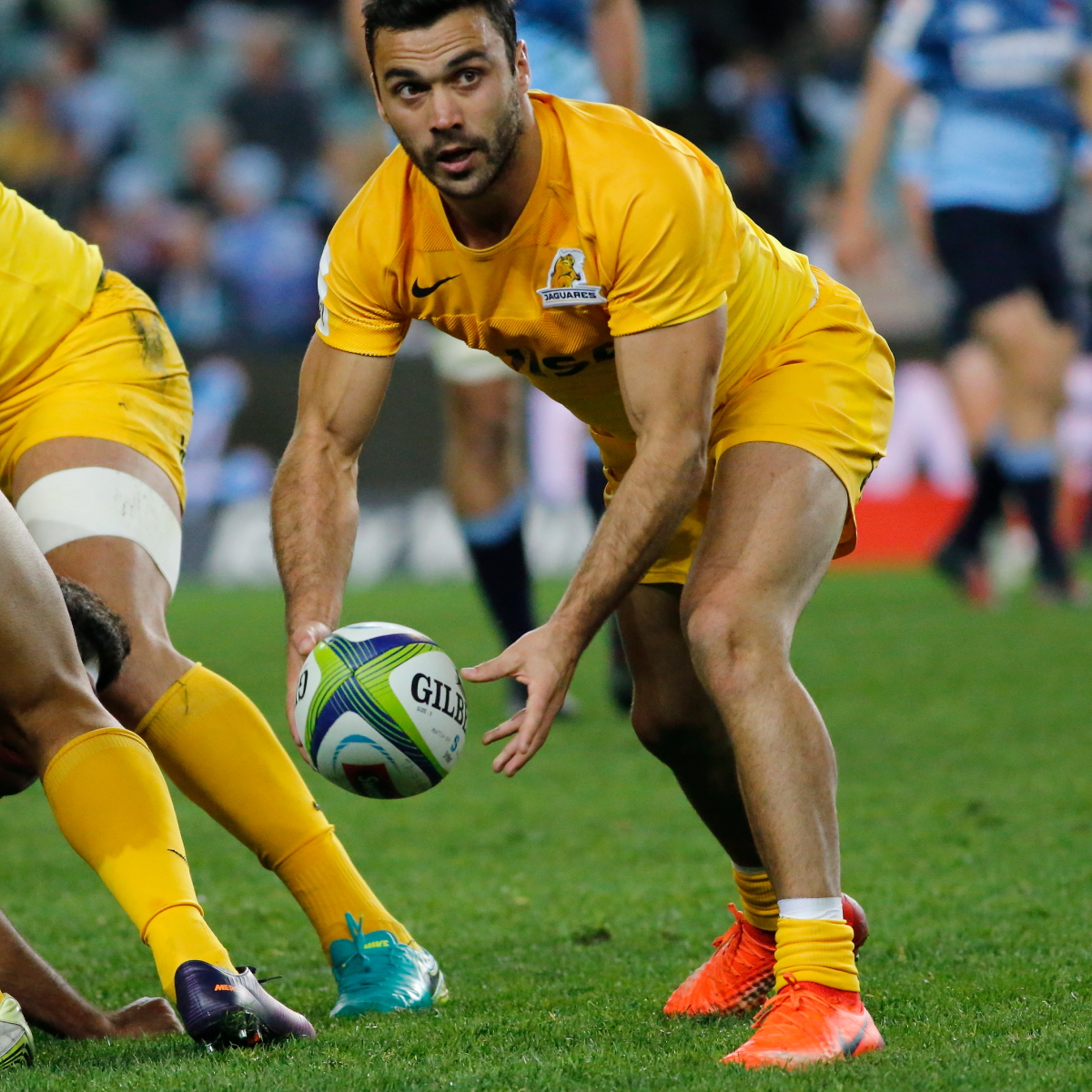
- Born: Martín Landajo; 14 June 1988 (age 38) Buenos Aires, Argentina
- Height: 1.75 m (5 ft 9 in)
- Weight: 82 kg (12 st 13 lb; 181 lb)
- School: St. Andrew's Scots School

Rugby union career
- Position: Scrum-Half / Fly-half
- Current team: Harlequins
Senior career
Years	Team	Apps	(Points)
2009–	CASI	25	(50)
2011–15	Pampas XV	21	(35)
2019–2021	Harlequins	33	(25)
2021–	Perpignan		
- Correct as of 30 May 2021
Super Rugby
Years	Team	Apps	(Points)
2016−	Jaguares	13	(30)
- Correct as of 22 July 2016
International career
Years	Team	Apps	(Points)
2008–	Argentina	83	(30)
- Correct as of 10 September 2018

Martín Landajo (born 14 June 1988, in Buenos Aires) is an Argentine rugby union player. He plays as a scrumhalf. He currently plays for national Argentina team and USA Perpignan. He played for Pampas XV.

He has 27 caps for national Argentina team, since 2008, with 5 tries scored, 25 points on aggregate. He was part of the Argentina squad that competed in the Rugby Championship 2012, 2013, 2014 and 2015.

Landajo was part of the national team that competed at the 2015 Rugby World Cup.

In 2019 he joined English club Harlequins. He was a replacement in the Premiership final against Exeter on 26 June 2021 as Harlequins won the game 40–38 in the highest scoring Premiership final ever.

On 19 June 2021, Landajo travels to France to join Perpignan in the Top 14 competition ahead of the 2021–22 season.
