= Joaquín Tuculet =

Argentine rugby union player

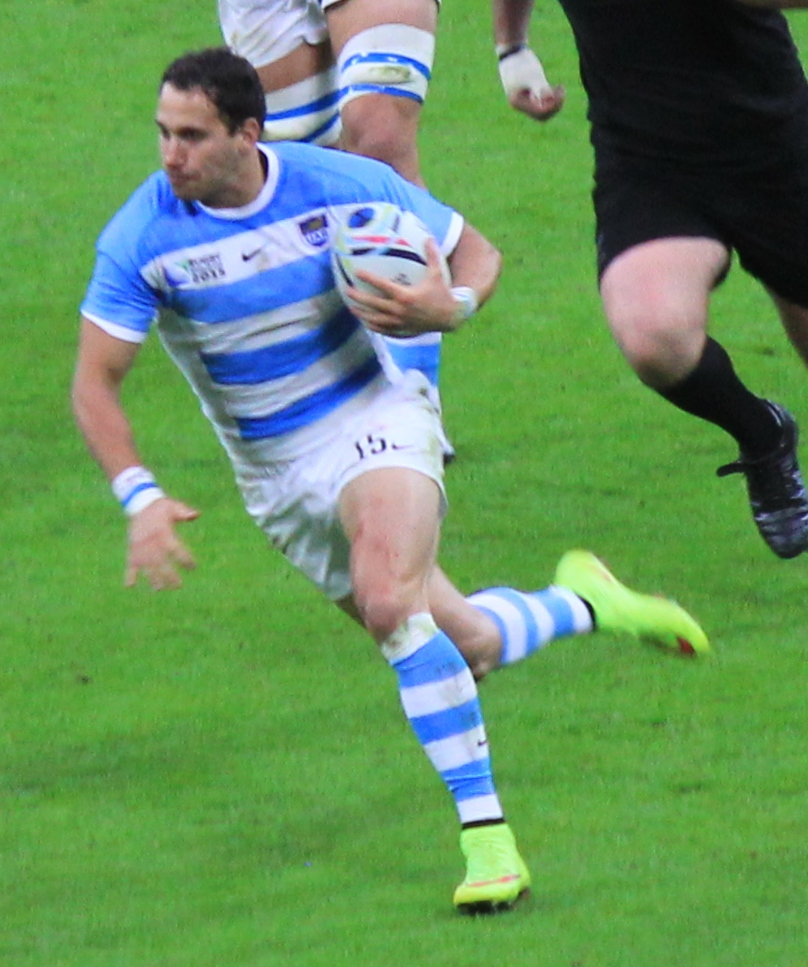
- Born: Joaquín Tuculet; 8 August 1989 (age 37) La Plata, Argentina
- Height: 1.81 m (5 ft 11 in)
- Weight: 91 kg (14 st 5 lb; 201 lb)

Rugby union career
- Position(s): Full-back, Wing, Fly-half, Centre
- Current team: Los Tilos
Amateur team(s)
Years	Team	Apps	(Points)
2015	Los Tilos		
Senior career
Years	Team	Apps	(Points)
2010–2011	Los Tilos	3	(10)
2011	Pampas XV	10	(30)
2011–12	Sale Sharks	18	(10)
2012–13	Grenoble	22	(18)
2013–14	Bordeaux Bègles	4	(10)
2014–15	Cardiff Blues	13	(15)
2016–2020	Jaguares	46	(50)
2021−	Toronto Arrows		
- Correct as of 22 July 2016
International career
Years	Team	Apps	(Points)
2008	Argentina U19	3	(27)
2008–09	Argentina U20	10	(0)
2009–11	Argentina Jaguars	12	(48)
2010	Pumas Sevens	4	
2012–2019	Argentina	56	(80)
- Correct as of 18 September 2019

Joaquín Tuculet (born 8 August 1989 in La Plata, Argentina) is an Argentine rugby union player who currently plays for the Toronto Arrows of Major League Rugby (MLR). He also played for the national Argentina team The Pumas and the country's Super Rugby team, the Jaguares.

Tuculet is capable of playing full-back, wing, centre or fly-half.

== Professional career ==
After Pampas XV won the Vodacom Cup, Tuculet was selected for Los Jaguares (Argentina A; not to be confused with the Super Rugby team) for the IRB Nations Cup in Romania and was the teams fullback. Tuculet played for Argentina in the IRB Junior World Championship in 2008 in Wales and 2009 in Japan, featuring for Los Pumitas in matches vs Fiji, Ireland, New Zealand and Uruguay as the teams fullback. He got his first cap for Argentina in 2012, playing against Italian Rugby Union team.

Joaquín was part of the Argentina squad that competes in the Rugby Championship.

He was part of the national teams that competed at the 2015 Rugby World Cup and the 2019 Rugby World Cup. In September 2020, Tuculet retired from Los Pumas one day after bringing an end to his contract with the Unión Argentina de Rugby. During early October 2020, the Canadian rugby union team Toronto Arrows signed Tuculet making him the third Argentine to form part of the team along with Tommy de la Vega and Manuel Montero.
