= Nahuel Tetaz Chaparro =

Argentine rugby union player (born 1989)

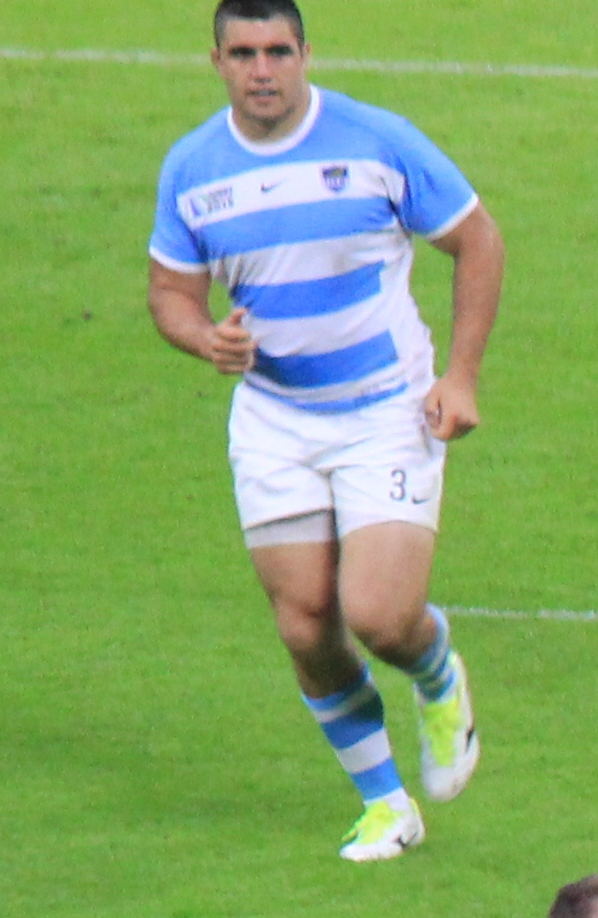
- Chaparro representing Argentina during the Rugby World Cup
- Full name: Francisco Nahuel Tetaz Chaparro
- Born: 11 June 1989 (age 37) General Madariaga, Argentina
- Height: 1.88 m (6 ft 2 in)
- Weight: 121 kg (267 lb; 19 st 1 lb)

Rugby union career
- Position: Prop
Senior career
Years	Team	Apps	(Points)
2009−2014	La Plata	33	(15)
2010–2011	Pampas XV	15	(0)
2012–2013	Stade Français	8	(0)
2013–2014	Dragons	18	(10)
2014–2015	Lyon	11	(0)
2016–2020	Jaguares	50	(0)
2021	Bristol Bears	4	(0)
2021−2026	Benetton	43	(0)
- Correct as of 18 May 2026
International career
Years	Team	Apps	(Points)
2009	Argentina U20	6	(0)
2009−2014	Argentina Jaguars	11	(5)
2010−2025	Argentina	81	(15)
- Correct as of 18 May 2026

Francisco Nahuel Tetaz Chaparro (born 11 June 1989) is a former Argentine professional rugby union player who played as a prop for the Argentina national team.

== Club career ==
A prop forward, he began his career with Bigua Rugby Club (Mar del Plata) and La Plata. From 2011 to 2013 he joined with Stade Français. In 2013 Tetaz Chaparro signed with Newport Gwent Dragons for the 2013–14 season and Lyon Olympique for the 2014–15 season. He was released by the Dragons in April 2014. After the experience with Jaguares in Super Rugby from 2016 to 2020, in 2021, he played for the Bristol Bears in Premiership Rugby.

== International career ==
In 2009, he was named in the Argentina Under 20 squad and from 2009 to 2014 in the Argentina Jaguars. Member of Pumas from 2010, Chaparro was a starter for the Argentina national team on 14 November 2020 in their first ever win against the All Blacks. Chaparro was named in Argentina's squad for the 2015 Rugby World Cup but then had to withdraw through injury and was replaced by Juan Figallo.
