= Leonardo Senatore (rugby union) =

Argentine rugby union footballer

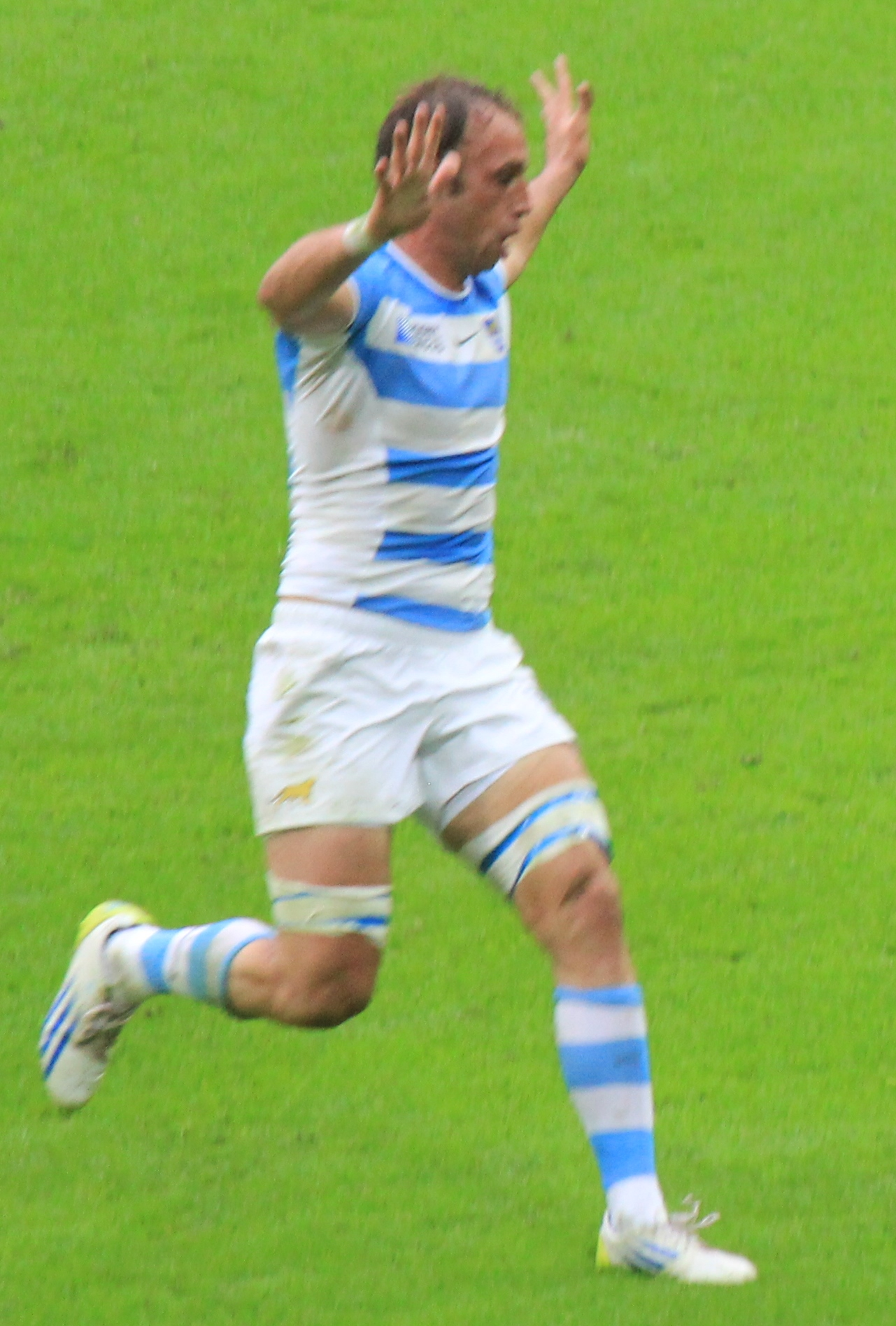
- Born: Leonardo Vicente Senatore; 13 May 1984 (age 42) Rosario, Argentina
- Height: 1.91 m (6 ft 3 in)
- Weight: 106 kg (16 st 10 lb; 234 lb)

Rugby union career
- Position(s): Number eight, Flanker
Amateur team(s)
| Years | Team | Apps | (Points) |
| 2003-2009 | GER | | |
| 2013, 2015- | GER | | |
Senior career
| Years | Team | Apps | (Points) |
| 2010-2012 | Pampas XV | 23 | (20) |
| 2012 | Toulon | 8 | (10) |
| 2013 | Pampas XV | | |
| 2013–15 | Worcester Warriors | 15 | (5) |
- Correct as of 18 August 2015
Provincial / State sides
| Years | Team | Apps | (Points) |
- Rosario
Super Rugby
| Years | Team | Apps | (Points) |
| 2016− | Jaguares | 8 | (20) |
- Correct as of 22 July 2016
International career
| Years | Team | Apps | (Points) |
| 2003 | Argentina U19 | 3 | (5) |
| 2008 | Argentina A | 3 | (0) |
| 2009–12 | Argentina Jaguars | 17 | (30) |
| 2008– | Argentina | 50 | (20) |
- Correct as of 23 June 2018
National sevens team
| Years | Team | | Comps |
| 2008 | Pumas Sevens | | 2 |
- Correct as of 15 August 2013

Leonardo Senatore (born 13 May 1984 in Rosario) is an Argentine rugby union player. He plays as a number eight or flanker. He made his debut against Uruguay. He was then selected to play against Chile and scored a try in that game.

In July 2011 rumors reported that RFU Championship side Newcastle Falcons coach Alan Tait had thought of Senatore as a possible signing for the club.

In January 2013 he played for the Aviva Premiership club Worcester Warriors for the 2013–14 season.

He participated at the 2011 Rugby World Cup and 2015 Rugby World Cup.

Senatore is part of the national squad that competes in the Rugby Championship.

== See also ==
- Argentina Rugby Union
