= Manuel Montero =

Argentine rugby union player (born 1991)

- Born: Manuel Montero; November 20, 1991 (age 34) Buenos Aires, Argentina
- Height: 1.94 m (6 ft 4 in)
- Weight: 113 kg (17 st 11 lb; 249 lb)
- Occupation: Rugby player

Rugby union career
- Position(s): Wing, Fullback, Centre
- Current team: Toronto Arrows
Amateur team(s)
Years	Team	Apps	(Points)
2011	Club Pucará	55	(180)
2017–2019	Club Pucará		
2021–2022	Club Pucará		
Senior career
Years	Team	Apps	(Points)
2012–2015	Pampas XV	14	(60)
2020	Olimpia Lions	1	(5)
2021	Toronto Arrows	10	(35)
- Correct as of 28 September 2024
Super Rugby
Years	Team	Apps	(Points)
2016−2017	Jaguares	7	(5)
- Correct as of 22 July 2016
International career
Years	Team	Apps	(Points)
2010−2011	Argentina Under 20	9	(5)
2018−2019	Argentina XV	6	(5)
2011–2017	Argentina	27	(80)
- Correct as of 20 September 2017
National sevens team
Years	Team		Comps
2010–11	Argentina		3

Manuel "Pantera" Montero (born November 20, 1991, in Buenos Aires) is a rugby union player who played for Argentina on the wing.

Montero previously played for the Jaguares in Super Rugby.

== Playing career ==
Montero switched to rugby from basketball as a teenager, when his best friend Agustín José Fornonzini forced him to do so, claiming he would be an outstanding rugby player.

He was selected for the Argentina Under 20s side for the IRB Junior World Cup in 2010, a year later in 2011 he was the standout player for Argentina in the Under 20 World Cup scoring against Italy and setting up a try with a great individual effort. After a spell in the Argentina Sevens side, in 2012 he gained selection for the Pampas XV and made his Pumas debut later that year, scoring a hat trick in his second test against Brazil and scoring 5 tries in his 3 matches. In his first start against a top nation, he scored the match winning try to defeat France in Cordoba.

He was included in Argentina's squad that debuted at the new 2012 Rugby Championship.

Montero is signed to play for Jaguares until 2017.
