= Lucas González Amorosino =

Argentine rugby union player (born 1985)

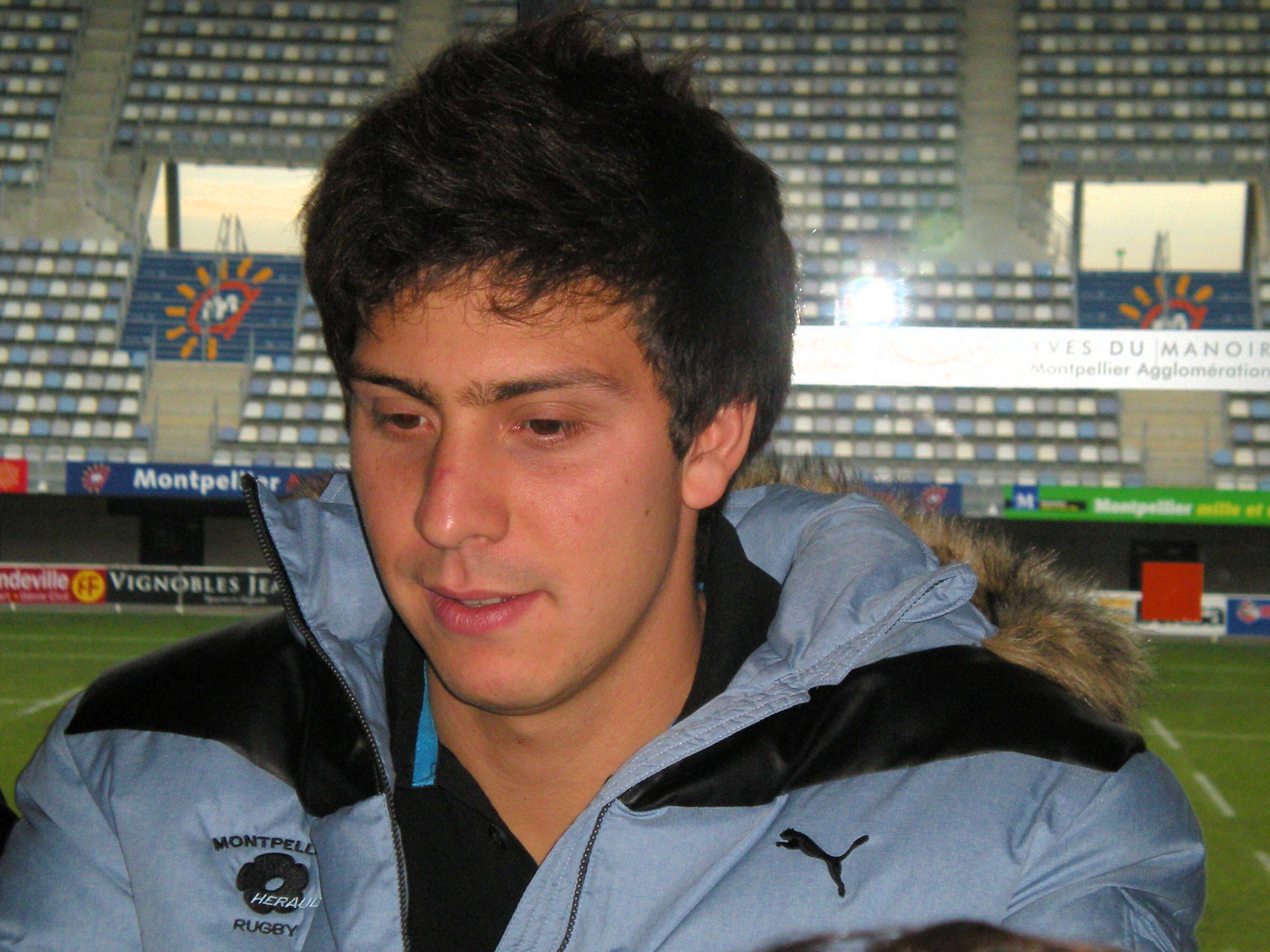
- Born: Lucas Pedro González Amorosino; 2 November 1985 (age 41) Buenos Aires, Argentina
- Height: 1.85 m (6 ft 1 in)
- Weight: 88 kg (13.9 st; 194 lb)

Rugby union career
- Position(s): Fullback, Wing
Amateur team(s)
Years	Team	Apps	(Points)
- Pucará
Senior career
Years	Team	Apps	(Points)
2009–2011	Leicester	13	(20)
2011–2013	Montpellier	34	(40)
2013–2014	Oyonnax	10	(5)
2014–2015	Cardiff Blues	12	(10)
2015–2016	Munster	9	(0)
- Correct as of 5 February 2016
Provincial / State sides
Years	Team	Apps	(Points)
- Buenos Aires
Super Rugby
Years	Team	Apps	(Points)
2016	Jaguares	9	(10)
- Correct as of 22 July 2016
International career
Years	Team	Apps	(Points)
2009–2016	Argentina	52	(35)
- Correct as of 17 September 2016
National sevens team
Years	Team		Comps
- Argentina

Lucas González Amorosino (born 2 November 1985) is an Argentine rugby union player who plays fullback or wing.

He was part of the Argentina sevens team before joining Leicester in 2009 following his full international début against England that summer.

== Career ==
=== 2009–10 season ===
He was given a trial by Leicester before the start of the 2009/10 season, he was later given a full contract ahead of French international Nicolas Jeanjean who was also at Leicester on a trial basis at the time.

González Amorosino made an instant impression, scoring 4 tries in his first 6 matches, including 2 in the opening two rounds of the Heineken Cup and one in Leicester's win against a South African touring XV at Welford Road.

However, he suffered a stress fracture in his leg early in November in an LV Cup match and missed the 2010 November internationals. The Argentina management hit out at Leicester for playing him in two matches in three days.

He returned from his injury in January 2010 but from this point onwards he played very little for Leicester, despite the good start to his career at Leicester.

González Amorosino played for Argentina during the 2010 mid-year tests against Scotland and France, starting 2 of the 3 matches.

=== 2010–11 season ===
Lucas was given very few chances in his second season, he played just 3 matches in which he scored 2 tries. He played for Argentina during the 2010 November internationals, and played well setting up a try against in the Pumas victory over Italy.

He left Leicester at the end of the season and joined French Top 14 side Montpellier in search of game time. On Amorosino's departure, the Leicester coach Richard Cockerill commented "he has not developed and come on as well as we would have both liked." However, it could be said that Amorosino was unfairly ignored during his time at Leicester. In total, Amorosino scored 6 tries in 11 starts for Leicester.

González Amorosino played for Argentina in the 2011 mid-year tests and was selected for the 2011 Rugby World Cup.

=== 2011–12 season ===
Lucas played for Argentina in the 2011 Rugby World Cup, and played in all the Pumas matches apart from the first match against England. He was named man of the match against Romania, earning himself a place on the bench against Scotland. Against Scotland he scored the late match-winning try for Argentina to help them through to the quarter-finals, the try was seen as one of the best of the tournament. Amorosino made the second highest linebreaker throughout the World Cup.

Once González Amorosino arrived back from the World Cup to his new club Montpellier, he started very well and was named by French rugby newspaper Midi Olympique as the player of the round 12.

=== 2015–16 season ===
He was part of the Argentine squad for the 2015 Rugby World Cup in England.

In October 2015, it was announced that González Amorosino had joined Irish Pro12 side Munster on a three-month contract. Amorosino made his European Rugby Champions Cup debut on 14 November 2015, coming off the bench in Munster's opening 2015–16 pool game against Treviso.

=== Jaguares ===
At the conclusion of González Amorosino's Munster contract, he was announced as a member of the Jaguares squad for the 2016 Super Rugby season.
