= List of Bulls (rugby union) records and statistics =

This article collates key individual and team honours, awards, records and statistics relating to the Bulls – the professional South Africa rugby union club based in Pretoria, currently competing in United Rugby Championship, EPCR Challenge Cup and domestically in the Currie Cup.

== Club honours ==
=== Major international and domestic honours ===
Major honours in international competitions
Competition	Span	Titles won	Runner-up	Semi-finalists	Quarter-finalists	Qualifying-finalists	Round of 16
Super 10	1993	(0)	(0)				
Super Rugby	1996–2020	(3) 2007, 2009, 2010	(0)	(4) 1996, 2005, 2006, 2013	(1) 2019	(1) 2012	
Super Rugby Conference trophy	2011–2019	(1) 2013	(4) 2012, 2014, 2016, 2019				
United Rugby Championship	2021–2025	(0)	(3) 2021–22, 2023–24, 2024–25	(0)	(1) 2022–23		
United Rugby Championship SA Shield	2021–2025	(1) 2023–24	(2) 2021–22, 2022–23				
Pro14 Rainbow Cup	2021	(0)	(1) 2021				
Super Rugby Unlocked	2020	(1) 2020	(0)				
European Rugby Champions Cup	2022–2025	(0)	(0)	(0)	(1) 2023–24		(2) 2022–23, 2025–26
EPCR Challenge Cup	2025	(0)	(0)	(0)	(1) 2024-25		(0)
Major honours in domestic competitions
Currie Cup	1939–2025	(25) 1946, 1956, 1968, 1969, 1973, 1974, 1975, 1977, 1978, 1980, 1981, 1987, 1988, 1991, 1998, 2002, 2003, 2004, 2009, 2020–21, 2021; Title shared in 1971, 1979, 1989, 2006	(9)	(10)	(1)		
Currie Cup First Division	2000	(1) 2000	(0)	(0)			
Lion Cup	1983–1994	(3) 1985, 1990, 1991	(3) 1987, 1988, 1989	(4) 1983, 1984, 1986, 1993	(1) 1994		
Vodacom Cup	1998–2015	(3) 2001, 2008, 2010	(6) 2002, 2003, 2004, 2007, 2009, 2011	(4) 2005, 2012, 2014, 2015	(2) 2000, 2013		
Rugby Challenge	2017–2019	(0)	(0)	(1) 2017	(1) 2018		
Toyota Challenge	2022	(0)	(1) 2022	(0)			
M-Net Nite Series	1992–1995	(3) 1992, 1993, 1995	(0)				
Percy Frames Trophy	1986–1994	(6) 1987, 1988, 1989, 1990, 1991, 1992	(1) 1994				
Teljoy Cup	1986–1992	(5) 1986, 1987, 1988, 1990, 1992	(1) 1991				
Ellis Park Challenge Series	1985	(1) 1985	(0)				

=== Minor honours ===
Minor honours
Competition	Number of titles	Runner-up
Gauteng Rugby Cup	(1) 2013	(0)
Sanlam Challenge Shield	(1) 2015	(0)
Lafarge Zimbabwe Champions Cup	(0)	(1) 2016
World Club 10s	(2) 2017, 2018	(0)
Officeconomix Goodwill Challenge	(1) 2022	(0)
IBG Challenge Cup	(1) 2024	(0)
Mapungubwe Rugby Cup	(1) 2024	(0)

== Statisitics ==
=== Currie Cup ===
This is a complete list of point scorers in the Currie Cup in the professional era for Northern Transvaal (1996–1998) and the Bulls (1999–2025). This list was compiled by using the Wayback Machine on the SA Rugby website and archive news articles from Die Beeld and Rapport newspapers. Due to lack of archive evidence, the player caps cannot be established.

Full list of point scorers for Northern Transvaal 1996–1998 and Blue Bulls 1999–2025 in the Currie Cup
Name	Tries	Conversions	Penalties	Drop goals	Points
Morne Steyn	17	188	129	10	875
Derick Hougaard	11	132	107	24	712
Casper Steyn	25	79	101	0	586
Jacques-Louis Potgieter	3	46	67	0	308
Louis Fouche	3	43	59	5	293
Tian Schoeman	3	61	50	0	287
John Mametsa	44	0	0	0	220
Franco Smith	9	43	28	0	215
Chris Smith	2	57	21	0	187
Jaco van der Westhuyzen	13	28	19	1	181
Tony Jantjies	5	49	23	0	174
Johan Goosen	4	49	16	0	166
Francois Brummer	1	23	33	1	153
Louis Strydom	3	41	15	0	142
Anton Leonard	28	0	0	0	140
Akona Ndungane	28	0	0	0	140
Manie Libbok	8	29	13	0	137
Ettienne Botha	27	0	0	0	135
Hannes Venter	20	12	3	0	133
Johan Roets	24	0	1	3	131
Derick Kuun	26	0	0	0	130
Theo van Rensburg	2	28	15	0	111
Roland de Marigny	2	8	26	1	107
Lance Sherrell	2	26	15	0	107
Pedrie Wannenburg	21	0	0	0	105
Joshua Stander	5	32	5	0	104
Jamba Ulengo	20	0	0	0	100
Bjorn Basson	20	0	0	0	100
Marius Delport	20	0	0	0	100
Jacques Olivier	20	0	0	0	100
Burton Francis	2	19	13	1	90
JP Nel	19	0	0	0	95
Wynand Olivier	19	0	0	0	95
Joost van der Westhuizen	18	0	0	0	90
Wim Meyer	18	0	0	0	90
Frikkie Welsh	18	0	0	0	90
Jaco van der Walt	4	21	8	0	86
Gerhard van den Heever	17	0	0	0	85
Cornal Hendricks	17	0	0	0	85
Conrad Breytenbach	16	0	0	0	80
Johan Wasserman	16	0	0	0	80
Deon Stegmann	16	0	0	0	80
Marnitz Boshoff	0	28	4	0	77
David Kriel	15	0	0	0	75
Handre Pollard	0	10	13	1	73
McNeil Hendricks	14	0	0	0	70
Danie Rossouw	14	0	0	0	70
Nicky van der Walt	13	0	0	0	65
Fourie du Preez	13	0	0	0	65
Boeta Chamberlain	0	26	4	0	64
Warrick Gelant	12	0	1	0	63
Francois Hougaard	12	0	0	0	60
Johan Grobbelaar	12	0	0	0	60
Travis Ismaiel	12	0	0	0	60
Zak Burger	12	0	0	0	60
Andre Snyman	11	0	0	0	55
Dries Scholtz	11	0	0	0	55
Burger Odendaal	11	0	0	0	55
CJ Stander	11	0	0	0	55
Arno Botha	11	0	0	0	55
Keagan Johannes	5	12	1	0	52
Gary Botha	10	0	0	0	50
Embrose Papier	10	0	0	0	50
Stravino Jacobs	10	0	0	0	50
Grant Esterhuizen	10	0	0	0	50
Schutte Bekker	9	0	0	0	45
Bryan Habana	9	0	0	0	45
Dewald Potgieter	9	0	0	0	45
Piet van Zyl	9	0	0	0	45
Ruan Steenkamp	9	0	0	0	45
Jade Stighling	9	0	0	0	45
Francois Venter	9	0	0	0	45
Stefan Watermeyer	9	0	0	0	45
Jan-Hendrik Wessels	9	0	0	0	45
Kennedy Tsimba	3	8	4	0	43
Dawie du Toit	6	0	4	0	42
FA Meiring	8	0	0	0	40
Keegan Fredericks	8	0	0	0	40
Marquit September	8	0	0	0	40
Kefentse Mahlo	8	0	0	0	40
Joe van Zyl	8	0	0	0	40
Mpilo Gumede	8	0	0	0	40
Jannie Claassens	7	0	0	0	35
Norman Jordaan	7	0	0	0	35
Tiger Mangweni	7	0	0	0	35
Jaco Pretorius	7	0	0	0	35
Sibongile Novuka	7	0	0	0	35
Hanro Liebenberg	7	0	0	0	35
Dean Greyling	7	0	0	0	35
Andre Warner	7	0	0	0	35
Ivan van Zyl	7	0	0	0	35
Juann Else	7	0	0	0	35
Boeta Wessels	0	5	8	0	34
Zane Kirchner	6	2	0	0	34
Jannie Kruger	0	9	4	1	33
Ruben Kruger	6	0	0	0	30
Wessel Roux	6	0	0	0	30
Tiaan Joubert	6	0	0	0	30
Gavin Passens	6	0	0	0	30
Warren Brosnihan	6	0	0	0	30
Wikus van Heerden	6	0	0	0	30
Jacques Cronje	6	0	0	0	30
Stefan Basson	6	0	0	0	30
Werner Kruger	6	0	0	0	30
Roelof Smit	6	0	0	0	30
Lizo Gqoboka	6	0	0	0	30
Elrigh Louw	6	0	0	0	30
Harold Vorster	6	0	0	0	30
Chris Barend Smit	6	0	0	0	30
Marcell Coetzee	6	0	0	0	30
Marius Goosen	4	0	2	1	29
Rynhard van As	0	10	2	0	26
Graeme Bouwer	4	1	1	0	25
Lourens Campher	5	0	0	0	25
Archer Dames	5	0	0	0	25
Bakkies Botha	5	0	0	0	25
Heini Adams	5	0	0	0	25
Rosko Specman	5	0	0	0	25
Gurthro Steenkamp	5	0	0	0	25
Jaco Engels	5	0	0	0	25
Tapiwa Tsomondo	5	0	0	0	25
Duncan Matthews	5	0	0	0	25
Marco van Staden	5	0	0	0	25
Ulrich Beyers	5	0	0	0	25
Dries Swanepoel	5	0	0	0	25
Sampie Mastriet	5	0	0	0	25
Jano Vermaak	5	0	0	0	25
Juan Mostert	2	7	0	0	24
Jurgen Visser	2	1	4	0	24
Divan Rossouw	4	1	0	0	22
Kurt Webster	1	6	1	0	20
Danie van Schalkwyk	4	0	0	0	20
Jannie Brooks	4	0	0	0	20
Adriaan Richter	4	0	0	0	20
Chivago Breda	4	0	0	0	20
Wium Basson	4	0	0	0	20
Johan Schutte	4	0	0	0	20
Danie Coetzee	4	0	0	0	20
Coenraad Groenewald	4	0	0	0	20
Richard Bands	4	0	0	0	20
Victor Matfield	4	0	0	0	20
Danwel Demas	4	0	0	0	20
Riaan van der Bergh	4	0	0	0	20
Richard Kriel	4	0	0	0	20
Tim Dlulane	4	0	0	0	20
Madosh Tambwe	4	0	0	0	20
Dayan van der Westhuizen	4	0	0	0	20
Jacques du Plessis	4	0	0	0	20
Warwick Tecklenburg	4	0	0	0	20
Pierre Spies	4	0	0	0	20
Ruan Snyman	4	0	0	0	20
Juandre Kruger	4	0	0	0	20
Flip van der Merwe	4	0	0	0	20
Ruben van Heerden	4	0	0	0	20
Marco Jansen van Vuren	4	0	0	0	20
Mornay Smith	4	0	0	0	20
Canan Moodie	4	0	0	0	20
Kurt-Lee Arendse	4	0	0	0	20
Jeandre Rudolph	4	0	0	0	20
JT Jackson	3	1	0	0	17
Tinus de Beer	0	6	1	0	15
Willie Enslin	3	0	0	0	15
Henry Tromp	3	0	0	0	15
Krynauw Otto	3	0	0	0	15
Pierre Ribbens	3	0	0	0	15
Louis van Straaten	3	0	0	0	15
Jaco Barnard	3	0	0	0	15
Clive Terre Blanche	3	0	0	0	15
Frans Allers	3	0	0	0	15
Geo Cronje	3	0	0	0	15
Wylie Human	3	0	0	0	15
Piet Krause	3	0	0	0	15
Hilton Lobberts	3	0	0	0	15
Schalk Erasmus	3	0	0	0	15
Janko Swanepoel	3	0	0	0	15
Alcino Izaacs	3	0	0	0	15
Aphiwe Dyantyi	3	0	0	0	15
Johnny Kotze	3	0	0	0	15
Jano Venter	3	0	0	0	15
Edgar Marutlulle	3	0	0	0	15
Lionel Mapoe	3	0	0	0	15
Nic de Jager	3	0	0	0	15
Paul Willemse	3	0	0	0	15
Simphiwe Matanzima	3	0	0	0	15
Bismarck du Plessis	3	0	0	0	15
James Verity-Amm	3	0	0	0	15
Cyle Brink	3	0	0	0	15
Steadman Gans	3	0	0	0	15
William Small-Smith	3	0	0	0	15
Devon Williams	3	0	0	0	15
Henry Immelman	3	0	0	0	15
Francois (Swys) Swart	0	1	3	1	14
Kobus Engelbrecht	2	2	0	0	14
Ralf Schroeder	2	0	0	0	10
Thys Stoltz	2	0	0	0	10
Gerhard Laufs	2	0	0	0	10
Piet Boer	2	0	0	0	10
Peet Arnold	2	0	0	0	10
Brendell Brandt	2	0	0	0	10
Rayno Hendricks	2	0	0	0	10
Adriaan Fondse	2	0	0	0	10
Ruan Vermeulen	2	0	0	0	10
Okkie Kruger	2	0	0	0	10
Neil Powell	2	0	0	0	10
Wayne Julies	2	0	0	0	10
Tim Agaba	2	0	0	0	10
Jaco Visagie	2	0	0	0	10
Pierre Schoeman	2	0	0	0	10
Marvin Orie	2	0	0	0	10
Jason Jenkins	2	0	0	0	10
Grant Hattingh	2	0	0	0	10
Jesse Kriel	2	0	0	0	10
Adriaan Strauss	2	0	0	0	10
Lappies Labuschagne	2	0	0	0	10
Wiaan Liebenberg	2	0	0	0	10
Rudy Paige	2	0	0	0	10
Jacques Potgieter	2	0	0	0	10
Gerrit-Jan van Velze	2	0	0	0	10
Wilhelm Steenkamp	2	0	0	0	10
Stephan Dippenaar	2	0	0	0	10
Bandise Maku	2	0	0	0	10
Jannes Kirsten	2	0	0	0	10
Corniel Els	2	0	0	0	10
Nqoba Mxoli	2	0	0	0	10
Abongile Nonkontwana	2	0	0	0	10
Callie Visagie	2	0	0	0	10
Franco Naude	2	0	0	0	10
Renaldo Bothma	2	0	0	0	10
Bernard van der Linde	2	0	0	0	10
Reinhardt Ludwig	2	0	0	0	10
Muller Uys	2	0	0	0	10
Robert Hunt	2	0	0	0	10
Ruan Stefan Vermaak	2	0	0	0	10
Francois Klopper	2	0	0	0	10
Gerhard Steenekamp	2	0	0	0	10
Walt Steenkamp	2	0	0	0	10
WJ Steenkamp	2	0	0	0	10
Nizaam Carr	2	0	0	0	10
Cameron Hanekom	2	0	0	0	10
Cheswill Jooste	2	0	0	0	10
Sintu Manjezi	2	0	0	0	10
Cornel Smit	2	0	0	0	10
Nama Xaba	2	0	0	0	10
Katlego Letebele	2	0	0	0	10
JP Joubert	1	0	0	1	8
Conrad Stoltz	1	0	0	0	5
Derick Grobbelaar	1	0	0	0	5
Dewald Kamffer	1	0	0	0	5
Brent Moyle	1	0	0	0	5
Peet van Deventer	1	0	0	0	5
Johan Otto	1	0	0	0	5
Kosie Alberts	1	0	0	0	5
Andries Truscott	1	0	0	0	5
Derrick Grobbelaar	1	0	0	0	5
Mike Marais	1	0	0	0	5
Jean Pieters	1	0	0	0	5
John Williams	1	0	0	0	5
Robbie Rein	1	0	0	0	5
Rudi Rohrs	1	0	0	0	5
Christo Bezuidenhout	1	0	0	0	5
Draadkar de Lange	1	0	0	0	5
Naka Drotske	1	0	0	0	5
Chris le Roux	1	0	0	0	5
Ryno Hendricks	1	0	0	0	5
Giscard Pieters	1	0	0	0	5
Gavin September	1	0	0	0	5
Kobus Calldo	1	0	0	0	5
Andries Human	1	0	0	0	5
Kobus van der Walt	1	0	0	0	5
Francois van Schouwenburg	1	0	0	0	5
Trompie Nontshinga	1	0	0	0	5
James van der Walt	1	0	0	0	5
Sbu Nkosi	1	0	0	0	5
Mihlali Mosi	1	0	0	0	5
Eugene Hare	1	0	0	0	5
Wandisile Simelane	1	0	0	0	5
Ruan Nortje	1	0	0	0	5
Cebo Dlamini	1	0	0	0	5
Dewald Donald	1	0	0	0	5
Jaco Labuschagne	1	0	0	0	5
Hottie Louw	1	0	0	0	5
Dawid Kellerman	1	0	0	0	5
Conraad Van Vuuren	1	0	0	0	5
Dylan Sage	1	0	0	0	5
Rabs Maxwane	1	0	0	0	5
Boom Prinsloo	1	0	0	0	5
Ashton Fortuin	1	0	0	0	5
RG Snyman	1	0	0	0	5
Bongi Mbonambi	1	0	0	0	5
Alandre van Rooyen	1	0	0	0	5
Freddy Ngoza	1	0	0	0	5
Dan Kriel	1	0	0	0	5
Theo Maree	1	0	0	0	5
David Bulbring	1	0	0	0	5
Rocco Jansen	1	0	0	0	5
Jean Cook	1	0	0	0	5
Marcell van der Merwe	1	0	0	0	5
Jono Ross	1	0	0	0	5
Willie Wepener	1	0	0	0	5
Clayton Blommetjies	1	0	0	0	5
Franco Mostert	1	0	0	0	5
Chiliboy Ralepele	1	0	0	0	5
Hayden Groepes	1	0	0	0	5
Fudge Mabeta	1	0	0	0	5
Jacques Burger	1	0	0	0	5
Corne Beets	1	0	0	0	5
Akker van der Merwe	1	0	0	0	5
Dylan Smith	1	0	0	0	5
JJ Theron	1	0	0	0	5
Riyaad Bam	1	0	0	0	5
Jean Erasmus	1	0	0	0	5
Jaco Grobbelaar	1	0	0	0	5
Junior Pokomela	1	0	0	0	5
Johan Grobbelaar	0	0	1	0	3
Clinton Swart	0	1	0	0	2
Franco Knoetze	0	1	0	0	2
FC du Plessis	0	1	0	0	2
Jandre Burger	0	1	0	0	2
Vaughen Isaacs	0	1	0	0	2
Penalty tries 5 points	9				45
Penalty tries 7 points	7				49

- All matches included from 1996 to 2025, including all play-off matches included (quarterfinals, semifinals and finals)
- 2000 Bankfin Cup included
- 2005, 2016 Currie Cup qualification included

=== Vodacom Cup and SuperSport Rugby Challenge ===
This is a complete list of point scorers in the Vodacom Cup 2003–2015 and in the Rugby Challenge 2017–2019. Due to lack of archive evidence, the player caps cannot be established and 1998–2002 Vodacom Cup scorers are not able to be established.

List of point scorers for the Blue Bulls 2003–2019 in the Vodacom Cup and SuperSport Rugby Challenge
Player	Try	Con	Pen	DG	Points
Francois Brummer	4	39	55	12	299
Jacques-Louis Potgieter	4	55	43	4	271
Tony Jantjies	3	43	24	0	173
Marnitz Boshoff	3	37	20	2	155
Gideon (Gerhardus) Roux	5	33	20	0	151
Sampie Mastriet	26	0	0	0	130
John Mametsa	24	0	0	0	120
Burton Francis	1	22	16	6	115
Rocco Jansen	21	0	0	0	105
Earll Douwrie	6	22	5	0	89
Willie du Plessis	4	33	0	0	86
Kobus Marais	2	21	11	0	85
Tian Schoeman	2	21	10	0	82
Leonard Olivier	1	16	12	1	76
Morne Steyn	7	10	3	2	70
Marius Delport	14	0	0	0	70
Travis Ismaiel	14	0	0	0	70
Stefan Watermeyer	9	9	2	0	69
JT Jackson	5	15	4	0	67
Tinus de Beer	1	16	6	0	55
Clayton Blommetjies	11	0	0	0	55
Wiaan Liebenberg	11	0	0	0	55
Kefentse Mahlo	11	0	0	0	55
Duncan Matthews	11	0	0	0	55
Joshua Stander	1	20	3	0	54
Lukhanyo Nontshinga	10	0	0	0	50
Roelof Smit	10	0	0	0	50
Louis Fouche	0	6	11	0	45
Okkie Kruger	9	0	0	0	45
Wesley Dunlop	0	13	6	0	44
Louis Strydom	0	12	6	0	42
Ruan Vermeulen	8	0	0	0	40
Derick Kuun	8	0	0	0	40
Gerrit-Jan van Velze	8	0	0	0	40
Ruan Snyman	8	0	0	0	40
William Small-Smith	8	0	0	0	40
Dries Swanepoel	8	0	0	0	40
Jamba Ulengo	8	0	0	0	40
Franco Naude	8	0	0	0	40
Tiger Mangweni	7	0	0	1	38
Ruan Jopie Boshoff	2	5	6	0	38
Ulrich Beyers	6	1	0	1	35
Keegan Fredericks	7	0	0	0	35
Courtnall Skosan	7	0	0	0	35
Boom Prinsloo	7	0	0	0	35
JP Nel	6	0	0	0	30
Gavin September	6	0	0	0	30
Anton Leonard	6	0	0	0	30
Carel Hoffman	6	0	0	0	30
Braam Gerber	6	0	0	0	30
Xolisa Guma	6	0	0	0	30
Jurgen Visser	4	1	1	0	25
Johan Wasserman	5	0	0	0	25
Neil Powell	5	0	0	0	25
Marquit September	5	0	0	0	25
Shaun Adendorff	5	0	0	0	25
Corniel Els	5	0	0	0	25
Andre Warner	5	0	0	0	25
Jade Stighling	5	0	0	0	25
Theo Boshoff	2	7	0	0	24
Andell Loubser	2	6	0	0	22
Handre Pollard	0	9	1	0	21
Cornelis Hermanus Vermaas	4	0	0	0	20
Danwel Demas	4	0	0	0	20
Adriaan Fondse	4	0	0	0	20
Dries Scholtz	4	0	0	0	20
Deon Helberg	4	0	0	0	20
Jan Serfontein	4	0	0	0	20
Hencus van Wyk	4	0	0	0	20
Arno van Wyk	4	0	0	0	20
Nardus van der Walt	4	0	0	0	20
Rohan Janse van Rensburg	4	0	0	0	20
Burger Odendaal	4	0	0	0	20
Rabz Maxwane	4	0	0	0	20
Clyde Davids	4	0	0	0	20
Matthys Basson	4	0	0	0	20
Embrose Papier	4	0	0	0	20
Tiaan Schoeman	0	4	3	0	17
Wynand Olivier	3	0	0	0	15
Kobus van der Walt	3	0	0	0	15
Scott Mathie	3	0	0	0	15
Emile Verster	3	0	0	0	15
Frikkie Welsh	3	0	0	0	15
Wilhelm Steenkamp	3	0	0	0	15
Stephan Dippenaar	3	0	0	0	15
Dean Greyling	3	0	0	0	15
Vainon Willis	3	0	0	0	15
Francois Venter	3	0	0	0	15
Marnus Schoeman	3	0	0	0	15
Juandre Kruger	3	0	0	0	15
Corne Fourie	3	0	0	0	15
Jesse Kriel	3	0	0	0	15
Ivan Van Zyl	3	0	0	0	15
Johan Grobbelaar	3	0	0	0	15
Nqoba Mxoli	3	0	0	0	15
Erich Cronje	3	0	0	0	15
Diego Appollis	3	0	0	0	15
Ruan Steenkamp	3	0	0	0	15
Lian du Toit	3	0	0	0	15
Gavin Passens	2	0	0	0	10
Tiaan Joubert	2	0	0	0	10
Giscard Pieters	2	0	0	0	10
Danie Rossouw	2	0	0	0	10
Lafras Uys	2	0	0	0	10
Curlian John Genis	2	0	0	0	10
Werner Kruger	2	0	0	0	10
Wium Victor William Arlow	2	0	0	0	10
Chiliboy Ralepelle	2	0	0	0	10
Luvuyo Mhlobiso	2	0	0	0	10
Hilton Lobberts	2	0	0	0	10
Rudolf Coetzee	2	0	0	0	10
Dewald Potgieter	2	0	0	0	10
Dewald Pretorius	2	0	0	0	10
Nic Eyre	2	0	0	0	10
Tsepo Christian Kokoali	2	0	0	0	10
Francois Hougaard	2	0	0	0	10
JP Joubert	2	0	0	0	10
Johan Jackson	2	0	0	0	10
Rassie Jansen van Vuuren	2	0	0	0	10
Vince Gwavu	2	0	0	0	10
Fudge Mabeta	2	0	0	0	10
Morne Mellett	2	0	0	0	10
Akona Ndungane	2	0	0	0	10
Dries van Schalkwyk	2	0	0	0	10
Zane Botha	2	0	0	0	10
CJ Stander	2	0	0	0	10
Jean Cook	2	0	0	0	10
Basil Short	2	0	0	0	10
Waylon Murray	2	0	0	0	10
Reniel Hugo	2	0	0	0	10
Lohan Jacobs	2	0	0	0	10
David Bulbring	2	0	0	0	10
Ryan Nell	2	0	0	0	10
Wimpie van der Walt	2	0	0	0	10
Andrew Beerwinkel	2	0	0	0	10
Divan Rossouw	2	0	0	0	10
Arno Botha	2	0	0	0	10
Ruben van Heerden	2	0	0	0	10
Wian van Niekerk	2	0	0	0	10
Andrew Kota	2	0	0	0	10
Muller Uys	2	0	0	0	10
Manie Libbok	0	3	1	0	9
Vaughen Isaacs	1	2	0	0	9
Jeandre Fourie	0	1	2	0	8
Stefan Basson	1	0	1	0	8
Dustin Jinka	0	1	1	0	5
Bian Vermaak	1	0	0	0	5
Matt Frank	1	0	0	0	5
Werner Jungbluth	1	0	0	0	5
Sias Wagner	1	0	0	0	5
Francois van Schouwenburg	1	0	0	0	5
Gerhard Klerck	1	0	0	0	5
Ricardo Loubscher	1	0	0	0	5
Thabang Molefe	1	0	0	0	5
Adriaan Strauss	1	0	0	0	5
Athenkosi Mtya	1	0	0	0	5
Hennie Daniller	1	0	0	0	5
Riaan van der Bergh	1	0	0	0	5
Tim Dlulane	1	0	0	0	5
Deon Stegmann	1	0	0	0	5
Gerhard Human	1	0	0	0	5
Hendrik Roodt	1	0	0	0	5
Bandise Maku	1	0	0	0	5
Brett Colin Sharman	1	0	0	0	5
Jaco Engels	1	0	0	0	5
Jacques Burger	1	0	0	0	5
Wayne Julies	1	0	0	0	5
Willem Serfontein	1	0	0	0	5
Devin Oosthuizen	1	0	0	0	5
Ernst Heinrich Dinkelmann	1	0	0	0	5
Danie Faasen	1	0	0	0	5
Pieter van der Walt	1	0	0	0	5
Warwick Tecklenburg	1	0	0	0	5
Vincent Koch	1	0	0	0	5
Robbie Coetzee	1	0	0	0	5
Jono Ross	1	0	0	0	5
Jerome Pretorius	1	0	0	0	5
Franco Mostert	1	0	0	0	5
Daniel Adongo	1	0	0	0	5
Jacques Du Plessis	1	0	0	0	5
Piet Lindeque	1	0	0	0	5
Sidney Tobias	1	0	0	0	5
Marvin Orie	1	0	0	0	5
Warrick Gelant	1	0	0	0	5
Eduan Lubbe	1	0	0	0	5
Aston Fortuin	1	0	0	0	5
Brian Leitch	1	0	0	0	5
Dewald Naude	1	0	0	0	5
Jaco Visagie	1	0	0	0	5
Pierre Schoeman	1	0	0	0	5
Dewald Maritz	1	0	0	0	5
Edgar Marutlulle	1	0	0	0	5
Hanro Liebenberg	1	0	0	0	5
Jaco Bezuidenhout	1	0	0	0	5
Jan-Henning Campher	1	0	0	0	5
Jano Venter	1	0	0	0	5
Jason Jenkins	1	0	0	0	5
Marius Verwey	1	0	0	0	5
Llewellyn Classen	1	0	0	0	5
Madot Mabokela	1	0	0	0	5
Nick de Jager	1	0	0	0	5
Theo Maree	1	0	0	0	5
Werner Fourie	1	0	0	0	5
Cornal Hendricks	1	0	0	0	5
Coenraad Groenewald	0	0	1	0	3
JC Roos	0	0	0	1	3
Johannes Nthoro Mongalo	0	1	0	0	2
Penalty Tries 5 points	2				10
Penalty Tries 7 points	5				35

- Vodacom Cup included 2003–2015
- SuperSport Rugby Challenge included 2017–2019
