= 2010 Currie Cup Premier Division =

Domestic rugby union competition

- Champions: Sharks
- Top point scorer: Willem de Waal, Western Province (220)
- Top try scorer: Bjorn Basson, Griquas (21)

The 2010 Absa Currie Cup Premier Division was the 72nd season in the competition since it started in 1889. The competition was contested from 9 July through to 30 October.

It was won by the Sharks, who defeated Western Province 30–10 in the final at Absa Stadium, Durban. Patrick Lambie was named man-of-the-match for his tally of 25 points, the second highest total scored by an individual in a Currie Cup Final.

== Teams ==
Location of teams in 2010 Currie Cup Premier Division

| Team | Stadium | Capacity |
|---|---|---|
| Blue Bulls | Loftus Versfeld, Pretoria | 51,762 |
| Free State Cheetahs | Vodacom Park, Bloemfontein | 40,911 |
| Golden Lions | Coca-Cola Park, Johannesburg | 62,567 |
| Griquas | Griqua Park, Kimberley | 18,000 |
| Leopards | Profert Olën Park, Potchefstroom | 15,000 |
| Leopards | Royal Bafokeng Stadium, Phokeng | 42,000 |
| Pumas | Puma Stadium, Witbank | 20,000 |
| Pumas | Mbombela Stadium, Mbombela | 40,929 |
| Sharks | Absa Stadium, Durban | 55,000 |
| Western Province | Newlands Stadium, Cape Town | 51,900 |

== Standings ==
2010 Currie Cup Premier Division
| Pos | Team | Pld | W | D | L | PF | PA | PD | TF | TA | TB | LB | Pts | Qualification |
|---|---|---|---|---|---|---|---|---|---|---|---|---|---|---|
| 1 | Sharks | 14 | 10 | 0 | 4 | 492 | 300 | +192 | 62 | 30 | 9 | 3 | 52 | Title Play-Off Semi-Final |
| 2 | Western Province | 14 | 10 | 0 | 4 | 520 | 280 | +240 | 59 | 28 | 6 | 2 | 48 | Title Play-Off Semi-Final |
| 3 | Free State Cheetahs | 14 | 10 | 0 | 4 | 488 | 323 | +165 | 60 | 33 | 6 | 1 | 47 | Title Play-Off Semi-Final |
| 4 | Blue Bulls | 14 | 9 | 0 | 5 | 437 | 374 | +63 | 49 | 39 | 6 | 5 | 47 | Title Play-Off Semi-Final |
| 5 | Golden Lions | 14 | 7 | 0 | 7 | 401 | 407 | −6 | 45 | 46 | 7 | 4 | 39 | |
| 6 | Griquas | 14 | 6 | 0 | 8 | 477 | 496 | −19 | 60 | 61 | 10 | 3 | 37 | |
| 7 | Pumas | 14 | 4 | 0 | 10 | 329 | 573 | −244 | 45 | 78 | 6 | 1 | 23 | Promotion/Relegation Play-Off |
| 8 | Leopards | 14 | 0 | 0 | 14 | 263 | 654 | −391 | 30 | 93 | 2 | 3 | 5 | Promotion/Relegation Play-Off |

Rules for classification: 4 points for a win; 2 points for a draw; 1 bonus point for a loss by seven points or less; 1 bonus point for scoring four or more tries in a match

== Fixtures and results ==
- Fixtures are subject to change.
- All times are South African (GMT+2).

=== Compulsory Friendlies ===
| 18:00 2010-06-25 | Falcons | 3 - 80 | Sharks XV | John Vorster Stadium, Nigel |
| | Pen: J. Naudé 58' (1/2); Cards: T. Ngidi (yellow card) 18' to 30' | Scoreboard | Tries: J. Botes 15'c, 19'm, 72'c M. Rhodes 24'c T. Mtawarira 29'c M. Richards 35'c D. Jenner 38'c K. Daniel 40'c, 76'c S. Terblanche 43'c K. Cooper 66'm C. McLeod 80'c Con: R. Kockott (6/7); M. Dumond (2/3); J. Botes (1/1); K. Daniel (1/1) | Attendance: 1,500; Referee: Pro Legoete |

| 17:00 2010-07-02 | SWD Eagles | 12 - 50 | Griquas | Recreation Ground, Oudtshoorn |
| | Tries: B. McBean 24'm M. Potts 76'c Con: J. Blom (1/1); Cards: G. Mtyanda (yellow card) 26' to 37'; W. Bennett (yellow card) 36' to 46' | Scoreboard | Tries: W. Wilkins 5'c R. Viljoen 26'm W. Malgas 36'm B. Basson 44'c, 52'm M. Rosslee 60'c R. Barnes 62'c F. Spies 67'c Con: N. Olivier (5/8) | Referee: Stuart Berry |

| 18:00 2010-07-02 | Griffons | 5 - 29 | Western Province | North West Stadium, Welkom |
| | Tries: E. Schultz 58'm | Scoreboard | Tries: P. Louw 16'c, 36'c, 69'm A. Fondse 21'c Con: W. De Waal (3/3); Pen: W. De Waal 40' (1/2) | Attendance: 3,500; Referee: Lourens van der Merwe |

| 16:00 2010-07-03 | Boland Cavaliers | 29 - 45 | Golden Lions | Boland Stadium, Wellington |
| | Tries: C. Hendricks 9'm J. Pieterse 53'm, 80'c B. April 68'c L. Cornelius 78'm Con: J. Jansen (2/4) | Scoreboard | Tries: M. Killian 6'c, 59'm T. Chavhanga 14'c D. Minnie 19'c J.C. Janse van Rensburg 22'c J. Taute 56'c F. Van der Merwe 64'm Con: H. Kruger (4/4); E. Jantjies (1/3); Cards: G. Earle (yellow card) 77' | Referee: Joey Salmans |

| 16:00 2010-07-03 | Mighty Elephants | 11 - 24 | Blue Bulls | EPRU Stadium, Port Elizabeth |
| | Tries: T. Mangweni 47'm Pen: D. Stevens 2', 68' (2/2); Cards: J. Potgieter (yellow card) 26' to 36' | Scoreboard | Tries: G. Botha 29'm H. Groepes 58'c, 71'c J. Kruger 80'm Con: J.L. Potgieter (2/3) | Referee: Jason Jaftha |

| 19:00 2010-07-03 | Border Bulldogs | 7 - 45 | Free State Cheetahs | Buffalo City Stadium, East London |
| | Tries: D. Meslane 10'c Con: A. Gqobo (1/1) | Scoreboard | Tries: J. Nokwe 3'm F. Uys 17'c T. Carse 29'c C. Oosthuizen 43'c, 56'c K. Floors 66'c, 68'm Con: L. Strydom (4/5); S. Ebersohn (1/1) | Referee: Sandile Mayende |

=== Regular season ===
==== Round one ====
| 19:00 2010-07-09 | Leopards | 13 - 43 | Golden Lions | Royal Bafokeng Stadium, Phokeng |
| | Tries: D. Scholtz 63'm W. Koch 72'm Pen: C. Dumond 23' (1/5); Cards: R. Swanepoel (yellow card) 75' | Scoreboard | Tries: J. Vermaak 32'c, 53'c M. Delport 37'c W. Murray 48'm J. Taute 79'm Con: H. Kruger (3/4); Pen: H. Kruger 17', 22', 68', 75' (4/5) | Attendance: 400; Referee: Lourens van der Merwe |

| 19:10 2010-07-09 | Blue Bulls | 38 - 15 | Pumas | Loftus Versfeld, Pretoria |
| | Tries: J. Mametsa 5'c, 11'm S. Watermeyer 9'c D. Greyling 22'c S. Dippenaar 23'm D. Stegmann 68'c Con: J.L. Potgieter (3/5); F. Brummer (1/1) | Scoreboard; Report | Tries: T. Meyer 36'c A. Kettledas 76'm Con: R. Croy (1/2); Pen: R. Croy 3' (1/1) | Attendance: 6,110; Referee: Stuart Berry |

| 15:00 2010-07-10 | Griquas | 40 - 34 | Sharks | Griqua Park, Kimberley |
| | Tries: R. Barnes 31'm S. Roberts 43'c B. Basson 54'c, 71'm W. Wilkins 69'c Con: N. Olivier (3/5); Pen: N. Olivier 6', 59', 65' (3/3) | Scoreboard | Tries: L. Mvovo 14'c, 57'm S. Meyer 23'm M. Rhodes 37'c P. Cilliers 75'c Con: R. Kockott (2/4); M. Dumond (1/1); Pen: R. Kockott 34' (1/2); Cards: J. Botes (yellow card) 38' to 47' | Attendance: 1,000; Referee: Jaco Peyper |

| 17:00 2010-07-10 | Free State Cheetahs | 11 - 25 | Western Province | Vodacom Park, Bloemfontein |
| | Tries: T. de Bruyn 30'm Pen: L. Strydom 12', 61' (2/3) | Scoreboard | Tries: A. Fondse 39'c Con: W. de Waal (1/1); Pen: W. de Waal 16', 34', 37', 43', 46', 75' (6/6) | Attendance: 15,098; Referee: Marius Jonker |

==== Round two ====
| 19:10 2010-07-16 | Free State Cheetahs | 33 - 26 | Griquas | Vodacom Park, Bloemfontein |
| | Tries: R. Ebersohn 9'c C. Oosthuizen 33'c, 42'c, 66'c J. Nokwe 58'm Con: L. Strydom (4/5); Pen: L. Strydom (0/1); M. Bosman (0/1) | Scoreboard | Tries: B. Basson 49'c S. Pretorius 75'c Con: N. Olivier (2/2); Pen: N. Olivier (3/3); R. Viljoen (1/1) | Attendance: 1,000; Referee: Mark Lawrence |

| 15:00 2010-07-16 | Pumas | 37 - 32 | Leopards | Puma Stadium, Witbank |
| | Tries: E. Watts 12'c, 22'c, 30'm S. Venter 67'm A. Kettledas 76'c Con: E. Watts (3/4); C. Bezuidenhout (0/1); Pen: E. Watts (2/4) | Scoreboard | Tries: D. Scholtz 28'm, 63'm D. Matyeshana 33'c M. Bondesio 69'm J. Bowles 80'c Con: E. Watts (3/4); C. Durand (2/5); Pen: C. Durand (1/1) | Attendance: 1,000; Referee: Joey Salmans |

| 15:00 2010-07-17 | Western Province | 32 - 0 | Golden Lions | Newlands Stadium, Cape Town |
| | Tries: P. Louw 20'c C. Jantjes 52'm P. Myburgh 75'm Con: W. de Waal (1/3); Pen: W. de Waal 5', 26', 29', 40', 45' (5/5) | Scoreboard | | Attendance: 18,365; Referee: Jaco Peyper |

| 17:05 2010-07-17 | Sharks | 34 - 28 | Blue Bulls | Absa Stadium, Durban |
| | Tries: C. Burden 25'c L. Mvovo 47'c, 76'm K. Daniel 59'c, 77'm Con: P. Lambie (3/5); P. Lambie (1/3) | Scoreboard; Report | Tries: G.J. van Velze 5'm D. Greyling 65'c G. van den Heever 80'c Con: J.L. Potgieter (2/3); Pen: J.L. Potgieter (3/5) | Attendance: 25,573; Referee: Jason Jaftha |

==== Round three ====
| 19:00 2010-07-23 | Sharks | 27 - 17 | Pumas | Absa Stadium, Durban |
| | | Scoreboard | | Attendance: 12,486; Referee: Jonathan Kaplan |

| 19:10 2010-07-23 | Leopards | 23 - 42 | Western Province | Profert Olën Park, Potchefstroom |
| | | Scoreboard | | Referee: Sandile Mayende |

| 15:00 2010-07-24 | Griquas | 26 - 20 | Golden Lions | Griqua Park, Kimberley |
| | | Scoreboard | | Attendance: 1,000; Referee: Lourens van der Merwe |

| 17:05 2010-07-24 | Blue Bulls | 23 - 25 | Free State Cheetahs | Loftus Versfeld, Pretoria |
| | Tries: Derick Kuün; Stefan Watermeyer; Con: Jacques-Louis Potgieter (2); Pen: Jacques-Louis Potgieter (3) | Scoreboard; Report | Tries: Skipper Badenhorst; Con: Sias Ebersohn; Pen: Louis Strydom (5); Sias Ebersohn | Attendance: 21,478; Referee: Pro Legoete |

==== Round four ====
| 19:10 2010-07-30 | Leopards | 27 - 41 | Griquas | Profert Olën Park, Potchefstroom |
| | | Scoreboard | | Attendance: 600 |

| 15:00 2010-07-30 | Western Province | 54 - 13 | Pumas | Newlands Stadium, Cape Town |
| | | Scoreboard | | Attendance: 15,666 |

| 15:00 2010-07-31 | Free State Cheetahs | 13 - 25 | Sharks | Vodacom Park, Bloemfontein |
| | | Scoreboard | | Attendance: 17,000 |

| 17:05 2010-07-31 | Golden Lions | 18 - 32 | Blue Bulls | Coca-Cola Park, Johannesburg |
| | Try: JC Janse van Rensburg; Warren Whiteley; Con: Elton Jantjies; Pen: Elton Jantjies (2) | Scoreboard; Report | Try: Jacques-Louis Potgieter; Gerhard van den Heever; Con: Jacques-Louis Potgieter (2); Pen: Jacques-Louis Potgieter (6) | Attendance: 10,113 |

==== Round Five ====
| 19:10 2010-08-06 | Blue Bulls | 43 - 38 | Leopards | Loftus Versfeld, Pretoria |
| | Try: Gerhard van den Heever (2); Dewald Potgieter; Derick Kuun; Francois Hougaard; Stefan Watermeyer; Con: Jacques-Louis Potgieter (5); Pen: Jacques-Louis Potgieter | Scoreboard; Report | Try: Rynard Landman; Michael Bondesio (2); Walter Venter; Dumisane Matyeshana; Con: Niell Jacobs (4); Clayton Durand; Pen: Niell Jacobs |

| 15:00 2010-08-07 | Griquas | 3 - 50 | Western Province | Griqua Park, Kimberley |
| | | Scoreboard |

| 15:00 2010-08-07 | Pumas | 30 - 45 | Free State Cheetahs | Puma Stadium, Witbank |
| | | Scoreboard | | Attendance: 1,000 |

| 17:05 2010-08-07 | Sharks | 48 - 19 | Golden Lions | Absa Stadium, Durban |
| | | Scoreboard | | Attendance: 22,095 |

==== Round Six ====
| 19:00 2010-08-13 | Griquas | 58 - 25 | Pumas | Griqua Park, Kimberley |
| | | Scoreboard | | Attendance: 1,000 |

| 19:10 2010-08-13 | Leopards | 6 - 51 | Sharks | Royal Bafokeng Stadium, Phokeng |
| | | Scoreboard |

| 15:00 2010-08-14 | Golden Lions | 30 - 26 | Free State Cheetahs | Coca-Cola Park, Johannesburg |
| | | Scoreboard |

| 17:05 2010-08-14 | Western Province | 15 - 12 | Blue Bulls | Newlands Stadium, Cape Town |
| | Pen: Willem de Waal (5) | Scoreboard Report | Pen: Jacques-Louis Potgieter (4) | Attendance: 47,835; Referee: Marius Jonker |

==== Round Seven ====
| 19:00 2010-08-20 | Free State Cheetahs | 57 - 0 | Leopards | Vodacom Park, Bloemfontein |
| | | Scoreboard | | Attendance: 13,017; Referee: Jason Jaftha |

| 19:00 2010-08-20 | Blue Bulls | 39 - 38 | Griquas | Loftus Versfeld, Pretoria |
| | Tries: Ruan Snyman; John Mametsa (2); Dean Greyling; Bandise Maku; Con: Jacques-Louis Potgieter (4); Pen: Jacques-Louis Potgieter (2) | Scoreboard; Report | Tries: Bjorn Basson (3); Richard Lawson; Con: Naas Olivier (3); Pen: Naas Olivier (4) | Attendance: 9,893; Referee: Mark Lawrence |

| 19:10 2010-08-20 | Pumas | 30 - 33 | Golden Lions | Puma Stadium, Witbank |
| | | Scoreboard |

| 19:15 2010-08-21 | Sharks | 27 - 16 | Western Province | Absa Stadium, Durban |
| | | Scoreboard | | Attendance: 26,406 |

==== Round Eight ====
| 19:00 2010-08-27 | Golden Lions | 45 - 22 | Leopards | Coca-Cola Park, Johannesburg |
| | | Scoreboard | | Attendance: 3,112; Referee: Craig Joubert |

| 19:10 2010-08-27 | Pumas | 22 - 21 | Blue Bulls | Mbombela Stadium, Mbombela |
| | Tries: Christo le Roux; Elgar Watts; Ashwin Scott; Tian Meyer; Con: Elgar Watts | Scoreboard; Report | Tries: Dean Greyling; Dewald Potgieter; Con: Jacques-Louis Potgieter; Pen: Francois Brummer (2) Jacques-Louis Potgieter | Attendance: 20,000; Referee: Stuart Berry |

| 19:10 2010-08-27 | Sharks | 48 - 30 | Griquas | Absa Stadium, Durban |
| | | Scoreboard | | Attendance: 15,690; Referee: Jonathan Kaplan |

| 19:30 2010-08-27 | Western Province | 24 - 29 | Free State Cheetahs | Newlands Stadium, Cape Town |
| | | Scoreboard | | Attendance: 23,867; Referee: Pro Legoete |

==== Round Nine ====
| 19:10 2010-09-03 | Golden Lions | 46 - 28 | Western Province | Coca-Cola Park, Johannesburg |
| | | Scoreboard | | Attendance: 13,531; Referee: Mark Lawrence |

| 19:00 2010-09-03 | Leopards | 26 - 27 | Pumas | Profert Olën Park, Potchefstroom |
| | | Scoreboard | | Attendance: 2,000; Referee: Pro Legoete |

| 17:00 2010-09-03 | Griquas | 28 - 33 | Free State Cheetahs | Griqua Park, Kimberley |
| | | Scoreboard | | Attendance: 1,000; Referee: Sandile Mayende |

| 19:15 2010-09-04 | Blue Bulls | 40 - 34 | Sharks | Loftus Versfeld, Pretoria |
| | Try: Juandre Kruger; Ruan Snyman; Jaco Engels; Wynand Olivier; Con: Jacques-Louis Potgieter (3); Zane Kirchner; Pen: Jacques-Louis Potgieter (4) | Scoreboard; Report | Try: Lwazi Mvovo; Stefan Terblanche; Alistair Hargreaves; Con: Patrick Lambie (2); Pen: Patrick Lambie (5) | Referee: Jonathan Kaplan |

==== Round Ten ====
| 19:10 2010-09-10 | Pumas | 14 - 30 | Sharks | Puma Stadium, Witbank |
| | | Scoreboard | | Referee: Lourens van der Merwe |

| 15:00 2010-09-11 | Golden Lions | 40 - 29 | Griquas | Coca-Cola Park, Johannesburg |
| | | Scoreboard | | Attendance: 10,000; Referee: Jaco Peyper |

| 17:00 2010-09-11 | Western Province | 59 - 17 | Leopards | Newlands Stadium, Cape Town |
| | | Scoreboard | | Attendance: 14,939; Referee: Sandile Mayende |

| 17:05 2010-09-11 | Free State Cheetahs | 20 - 14 | Blue Bulls | Vodacom Park, Bloemfontein |
| | Try: Philip Van der Walt; Hendro Scholtz; Con: Louis Strydom (2); Pen: Louis Strydom (2) | Scoreboard; Report | Try: Jaco van der Westhuyzen; Pen: Jacques-Louis Potgieter (3) | Attendance: 17,541; Referee: Jason Jaftha |

==== Round Eleven ====
| 19:00 2010-09-17 | Griquas | 29 - 20 | Leopards | Griqua Park, Kimberley |
| | | Scoreboard | | Attendance: 1,000; Referee: Jason Jaftha |

| 19:10 2010-09-17 | Pumas | 10 - 62 | Western Province | Mbombela Stadium, Mbombela |
| | | Scoreboard | | Referee: Andrew Lees |

| 15:00 2010-09-18 | Sharks | 30 - 16 | Free State Cheetahs | Absa Stadium, Durban |
| | | Scoreboard | | Attendance: 27,402; Referee: Pro Legoete |

| 17:05 2010-09-18 | Blue Bulls | 24 - 21 | Golden Lions | Loftus Versfeld, Pretoria |
| | Try: Gerrit-Jan van Velze; Stefan Watermeyer; Con: Jacques-Louis Potgieter; Pen: Jacques-Louis Potgieter (4) | Scoreboard; Report | Try: Doppies la Grange; Waylon Murray; Con: Elton Jantjies; Pen: Elton Jantjies (3) | Attendance: 25,774; Referee: Craig Joubert |

==== Round Twelve ====
| 19:00 2010-09-24 | Free State Cheetahs | 59 - 24 | Pumas | Vodacom Park, Bloemfontein |
| | | Scoreboard | | Attendance: 13,348; Referee: Joey Salmans |

| 19:10 2010-09-24 | Western Province | 48 - 32 | Griquas | Newlands Stadium, Cape Town |
| | | Scoreboard | | Attendance: 18,972; Referee: Marius Jonker |

| 15:00 2010-09-25 | Leopards | 26 - 39 | Blue Bulls | Profert Olën Park, Potchefstroom |
| | Try: Dumisani Matyeshana; Cecil Dumond; Con: Clayton Durand (2); Pen: Clayton Durand (4) | Scoreboard; Report | Try: Jaco van der Westhuyzen; Jaco Pretorius; Derick Kuun; Hayden Groepes; Francois Hougaard; Stefan Watermeyer; Con: Jacques-Louis Potgieter (3); Pen: Jacques-Louis Potgieter | Attendance: 1,500; Referee: Nathan Pierce |

| 17:05 2010-09-25 | Golden Lions | 22 - 20 | Sharks | Coca-Cola Park, Johannesburg |
| | | Scoreboard | | Attendance: 25,315; Referee: Jason Jaftha |

==== Round Thirteen ====
| 19:10 2010-10-01 | Sharks | 63 - 6 | Leopards | Absa Stadium, Durban |
| | | Scoreboard | | Attendance: 18,707; Referee: Jaco Peyper |

| 15:00 2010-10-02 | Blue Bulls | 36 - 32 | Western Province | Loftus Versfeld, Pretoria |
| | Try: Okkie Kruger; Stefan Watermeyer; Zane Kirchner; Con: Jacques-Louis Potgieter (3); Pen: Jacques-Louis Potgieter (4); Drop: Jaco van der Westhuyzen; Cards: Dewald Potgieter (yellow card) 26' to 36' | Scoreboard; Report | Try: Juan De Jongh; Con: Willem de Waal; Pen: Willem de Waal (6); Cards: Jean de Villiers (yellow card) 40' to 50' | Attendance: 35,356; Referee: Craig Joubert |

| 15:00 2010-10-02 | Pumas | 31 - 61 | Griquas | Puma Stadium, Witbank |
| | | Scoreboard | | Referee: Jonathan Kaplan |

| 17:05 2010-10-02 | Free State Cheetahs | 43 - 37 | Golden Lions | Vodacom Park, Bloemfontein |
| | | Scoreboard | | Referee: Stuart Berry |

==== Round Fourteen ====
| 19:00 2010-10-08 | Leopards | 7 - 78 | Free State Cheetahs | Royal Bafokeng Stadium, Phokeng |
| | | Scoreboard | | Referee: Marius Jonker |

| 19:10 2010-10-08 | Golden Lions | 27 - 34 | Pumas | Coca-Cola Park, Johannesburg |
| | | Scoreboard | | Attendance: 8,591; Referee: Lourens van der Merwe |

| 15:00 2010-10-09 | Griquas | 36 - 48 | Blue Bulls | Griqua Park, Kimberley |
| | Tries: Barry Geel; Jean Stemmet; Bjorn Basson (2); Sarel Pretorius; Con: Naas Olivier (3); Rudi Vogt; Pen: Riaan Viljoen | Scoreboard; Report | Tries: Dewald Potgieter; Wynand Olivier; Gerhard van den Heever; Jaco Pretorius; Derick Kuun; Jaco van der Westhuyzen; Victor Matfield; Con: Morne Steyn (5); Pen: Morne Steyn | Attendance: 7,000; Referee: Jonathan Kaplan |

| 17:05 2010-10-09 | Western Province | 33 - 21 | Sharks | Newlands Stadium, Cape Town |
| | | Scoreboard | | Attendance: 51,900; Referee: Mark Lawrence |

=== Semi-finals ===
| 15:10 2010-10-16 | Sharks | 16 - 12 | Blue Bulls | Absa Stadium, Durban |
| | Tries: Keegan Daniel; Con: Patrick Lambie; Pen: Patrick Lambie (3) | Scoreboard; Report | Pen: Morne Steyn (4) | Attendance: 38,668; Referee: Marius Jonker |

| 17:05 2010-10-16 | Western Province | 31 - 7 | Free State Cheetahs | Newlands Stadium, Cape Town |
| | | Scoreboard | | Attendance: 47,876; Referee: Mark Lawrence |

=== Final ===
| 17:30 2010-10-30 | Sharks | 30-10 | Western Province | Absa Stadium, Durban |
| | | Scoreboard | | Attendance: 54,000; Referee: Craig Joubert |

2010 Absa Currie Cup
Premier Division Champions
Sharks
6th title

== Promotion/Relegation Games ==
=== Tables ===
2010 Promotion/Relegation Games — Pumas v Eastern Province Kings
| Pos | Team | Pld | W | D | L | PF | PA | PD | TF | TA | TB | LB | Pts |
|---|---|---|---|---|---|---|---|---|---|---|---|---|---|
| 1 | Pumas (P) | 2 | 1 | 1 | 0 | 82 | 64 | +18 | 12 | 7 | 0 | 0 | 6 |
| 2 | Eastern Province Kings (F) | 2 | 0 | 1 | 1 | 64 | 82 | −18 | 7 | 12 | 0 | 0 | 2 |

Rules for classification: 4 points for a win; 2 points for a draw; 1 bonus point for a loss by seven points or less; 1 bonus point for scoring four or more tries in a match
(F) Qualified for the 2011 Currie Cup First Division; (P) Qualified for the 2011 Currie Cup Premier Division

2010 Promotion/Relegation Games — Platinum Leopards v SWD Eagles
| Pos | Team | Pld | W | D | L | PF | PA | PD | TF | TA | TB | LB | Pts |
|---|---|---|---|---|---|---|---|---|---|---|---|---|---|
| 1 | Leopards (P) | 2 | 1 | 0 | 1 | 65 | 54 | +11 | 7 | 9 | 0 | 0 | 4 |
| 2 | SWD Eagles (F) | 2 | 1 | 0 | 1 | 54 | 65 | −11 | 9 | 7 | 0 | 0 | 4 |

Rules for classification: 4 points for a win; 2 points for a draw; 1 bonus point for a loss by seven points or less; 1 bonus point for scoring four or more tries in a match
(F) Qualified for the 2011 Currie Cup First Division; (P) Qualified for the 2011 Currie Cup Premier Division

=== Results ===
- Pumas remain in the Currie Cup Premier Division.
- Leopards remain in the Currie Cup Premier Division.
- Eastern Province Kings remain in the Currie Cup First Division.
- SWD Eagles remain in the Currie Cup First Division.

=== Round 1 ===
22 October 2010
19:10

| Pumas | 36–36 | Eastern Province Kings |
| Tries: T. Meyer 10'c C. Steenkamp 35'm V. Willis 42'm R. Uys 45'm A. Kettledas 53'c E. Watts 70'c Con: E. Watts (1/3); C. Bezuidenhout (2/3) | Scoreboard; Report | Tries: P. Perez 13'm N. Nelson 22'c D.W. Barry 30'm D. Oosthuizen 58'c Con: M. Dumond (2/4); Pen: M. Dumond 2', 49', 65', 79' (4/6) |

Puma Stadium, Witbank
Attendance: 1,000
Referee: Marius Jonker

23 October 2010
16:00

| Leopards | 37–22 | SWD Eagles |
| Tries: S. Marais 25'c, 78'c D. Dames 32'c, 65'c Con: C. Durand (4/4); Pen: C. Durand 9', 15', 22' (3/5); Cards: W. Venter (yellow card) 48' | Scoreboard; Report | Tries: S. Raubenheimer 18'm D. Hellmuth 50'c L. Hartnick 55'm D. Manuel 68'm Con: A. Barends (1/3) |

Profert Olën Park, Potchefstroom
Attendance: 1,000
Referee: Craig Joubert

=== Round 2 ===
29 October 2010
17:00

| SWD Eagles | 32–28 | Leopards |
| Tries: H. Grimes 6'c H. Grobler 28'm J. Engelbrecht 38'm S. Raubenheimer 51'm J. Terblanche 63'c Con: A. Barends (2/5); Pen: A. Barends 25' (1/1) | Scoreboard; Report | Tries: R.W. Kember 20'c S.P. Marais 75'm W. Venter 78'c Con: C. Durand (1/1); S.P. Marais (1/2); Pen: C. Durand 12', 19', 46' (3/3) |

Outeniqua Park, George
Attendance: 15,000
Referee: Jaco Peyper

29 October 2010
19:05

| Eastern Province Kings | 28–46 | Pumas |
| Tries: W. Stevens 7'c, 34'c J.J. Gagiano 15'm Con: M. Dumond (2/3); Pen: M. Dumond 40', 52', 56' (3/5); Cards: P. Nodikida (yellow card) 49' | Scoreboard | Tries: D. Le Roux 22'c, 47'c A. Kruger 38'm C. Steenkamp 43'c D. Steyn 63'c V. Willis 80'c Con: C. Bezuidenhout (5/6); Pen: C. Bezuidenhout 29', 74' (2/2) |

Nelson Mandela Bay Stadium, Port Elizabeth
Attendance: 45,000
Referee: Jonathan Kaplan

== See also ==
- 2010 Currie Cup First Division
- Currie Cup
- ABSA
