= 2010 Super 14 season =

Men's rugby union club competition

2010 Super 14
- Countries: Australia; South Africa; New Zealand
- Tournament format(s): Round-robin and knockout
- Champions: (South Africa) Bulls (3rd title)
- Matches played: 94
- Attendance: 1,964,908 (20,903 per match)
- Tries scored: 538 (5.72 per match)
- Top point scorer(s): (South Africa) Morné Steyn (263) (Bulls)
- Top try scorer(s): (New Zealand) Joe Rokocoko (9) (Blues) (Australia) Drew Mitchell (9) (Waratahs)

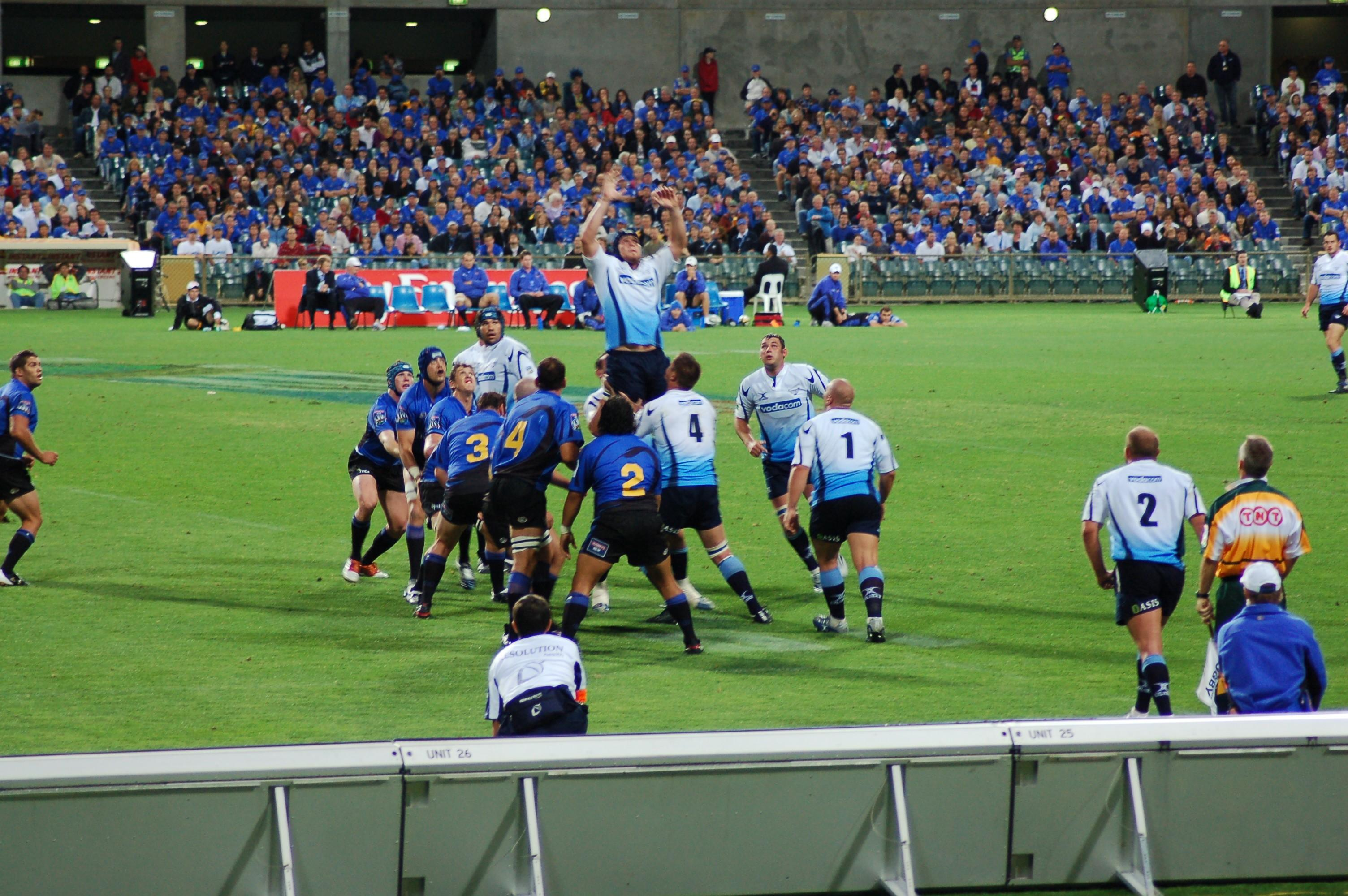
Super 14 LineOut Bulls

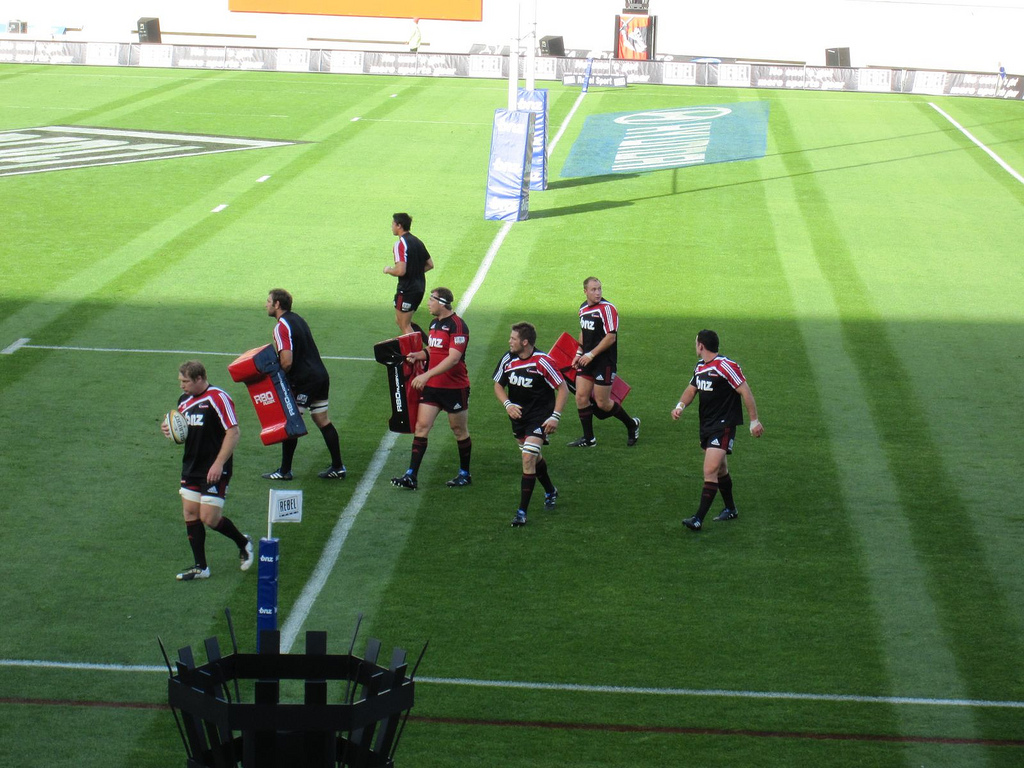
CRUSADERS - LIONS

The 2010 Super 14 season kicked off in February 2010 with pre-season matches held from mid-January. It finished on 29 May. The 2010 season was the fifth and last season of the expanded Super 14 format. The schedule, which covers 3½ months, featured a total of 94 matches, with each team playing one full round-robin against the 13 other teams, two semi-finals and a final. Every team received one bye over the 14 rounds.

== Table ==
Pos	Team	Pld	W	D	L	PF	PA	PD	B	Pts	Qualification
1	(South Africa) Bulls	13	10	0	3	436	345	+91	7	47	Advance to playoffs
2	(South Africa) Stormers	13	9	0	4	365	171	+194	8	44	Advance to playoffs
3	(Australia) Waratahs	13	9	0	4	385	288	+97	7	43	Advance to playoffs
4	(New Zealand) Crusaders	13	8	1	4	388	295	+93	7	41	Advance to playoffs
5	(Australia) Reds	13	8	0	5	366	308	+58	7	39	
6	(Australia) Brumbies	13	8	0	5	358	291	+67	5	37	
7	(New Zealand) Blues	13	7	0	6	376	333	+43	9	37	
8	(New Zealand) Hurricanes	13	7	1	5	358	323	+35	7	37	
9	(South Africa) Sharks	13	7	0	6	297	299	−2	5	33	
10	(New Zealand) Chiefs	13	4	1	8	340	418	−78	8	26	
11	(South Africa) Cheetahs	13	5	1	7	315	393	−78	4	26	
12	(New Zealand) Highlanders	13	3	0	10	297	397	−100	7	19	
13	(Australia) Force	13	4	0	9	258	364	−106	3	19	
14	(South Africa) Lions	13	0	0	13	270	585	−315	5	5	

== Referees ==
The referees for this tournament came from all three of the participating nations. Referees are ranked by Merit and Reserve Panels. They can be promoted or demoted to another panel. At least eighty Percent of the Super 14 games will be refereed by the Merit Panel Referees.

Australian referees

- Stuart Dickinson (Merit Panel)
- Steve Walsh (Reserve Panel)
- Ian Smith (Reserve Panel)
- Nathan Pearce (Reserve Panel)
- Paul Marks (Reserve Panel)- Stood down from panel, following reviews of his performances at the end of Week 4. He was re-included on the reserve panel for Round 14.

New Zealand referees

- Bryce Lawrence (Merit Panel)
- Chris Pollock (Merit Panel)
- Keith Brown (Merit Panel)
- Garratt Williamson (Reserve Panel)
- Jonathan White (Reserve Panel)
- Vinny Munro (Reserve Panel)

South African referees

- Craig Joubert (Merit Panel)
- Jonathan Kaplan (Merit Panel)
- Marius Jonker (Merit Panel)
- Mark Lawrence (Merit Panel)
- Jaco Peyper (Reserve Panel)
- Pro Legoete (Reserve Panel)- Stood down from panel, following reviews of his performances at the end of Week 4

== Results ==
=== Round 1 ===
12 February 2010	Blues (New Zealand)	20–34	(New Zealand) Hurricanes	North Harbour Stadium, North Shore City
19:35	Try: Brett, Afoa; Con: Brett (2); Pen: Brett (2)	Report	Try: Gear; Con: Weepu; Pen: Ripia (5), Weepu (4)	Attendance: 23,000; Referee: Stuart Dickinson (Australia)

A Super Rugby record was set when the Hurricanes kicked 9 penalty goals in total throughout the match, 5 to Willie Ripia and 4 to Piri Weepu.

12 February 2010	Western Force (Australia)	15–24	(Australia) Brumbies	Members Equity Stadium, Perth
19:05	Pen: O'Connor (5)	Report	Try: Valentine, Moore, Edmonds; Con: Mortlock (3); Pen: Mortlock	Attendance: 17,268; Referee: Steve Walsh (Australia)

Stirling Mortlock became the first player in Super Rugby to score over 1,000 points in this match.

12 February 2010	Cheetahs (South Africa)	34–51	(South Africa) Bulls	Vodacom Park, Bloemfontein
19:10	Try: Mapoe, Smith, Nokwe; Con: Olivier (2); Pen: Olivier (5)	Report	Try: Pretorius, Steyn, van den Heever, Kirchner, Olivier, Penalty Try; Con: Steyn (5), Potgieter; Pen: Steyn (3)	Attendance: 22,110; Referee: Jonathan Kaplan (South Africa)

13 February 2010	Crusaders (New Zealand)	32–17	(New Zealand) Highlanders	AMI Stadium, Christchurch
19:35	Try: Ellis, Payne, Guildford, Maitland; Con: Carter (3); Pen: Carter (2)	Report	Try: Hobbs (2); Con: Hobbs (2); Pen: Hobbs	Attendance: 22,793; Referee: Chris Pollock (New Zealand)

13 February 2010	Reds (Australia)	28–30	(Australia) Waratahs	Suncorp Stadium, Brisbane
18:40	Try: Braid, Horwill, Penalty Try; Con: Cooper (2); Pen: Cooper (2); Drop: Cooper	Report	Try: Sidey, Palu; Con: Halangahu; Pen: Barnes (4), Halangahu; Drop: Barnes	Attendance: 22,582; Referee: Craig Joubert (South Africa)

13 February 2010	Lions (South Africa)	13–26	(South Africa) Stormers	Coca-Cola Park, Johannesburg
17:05	Try: Killian; Con: Rose; Pen: Rose (2)	Report	Try: Pietersen, Fourie; Con: Pietersen (2); Pen: Pietersen (4)	Attendance: 13,850; Referee: Jaco Peyper (South Africa)

13 February 2010	Sharks (South Africa)	18–19	(New Zealand) Chiefs	Absa Stadium, Durban
19:10	Pen: Kockott (6)	Report	Try: Willison; Con: Donald; Pen: Donald (4)	Attendance: 27,296; Referee: Keith Brown (New Zealand)

=== Round 2 ===
19 February 2010	Highlanders (New Zealand)	15–19	(New Zealand) Blues	Carisbrook, Dunedin
19:35	Try: Dagg, Hobbs; Con: Hobbs; Pen: Dagg	Report	Try: P. Williams (2), Ranger; Con: Brett	Attendance: 6,700; Referee: Bryce Lawrence (New Zealand)

19 February 2010	Reds (Australia)	41–20	(New Zealand) Crusaders	Suncorp Stadium, Brisbane
19:45	Try: Cooper (2), Davies, Ioane; Con: Cooper (3); Pen: Cooper (5)	Report	Try: Ellis, Thorn; Con: Carter (2); Pen: Carter (2)	Attendance: 17,880; Referee: Craig Joubert (South Africa)

19 February 2010	Sharks (South Africa)	20–25	(South Africa) Cheetahs	Absa Stadium, Durban
18:00	Try: Kankowski; Pen: Kockott (5)	Report	Try: Viljoen; Con: Olivier; Pen: Olivier (3), Viljoen (2); Drop: Olivier	Attendance: 21,926; Referee: Jonathan Kaplan (South Africa)

19 February 2010	Lions (South Africa)	65–72	(New Zealand) Chiefs	Coca-Cola Park, Johannesburg
20:00	Try: Mjekevu (3), Clever, Spencer, la Grange, Chavhanga, Grobbelaar, Lombaard; Con: Rose (7); Pen: Rose (2)	Report	Try: Kahui (3), Bruce, Messam, Poluleuligaga, Sivivatu, Leonard, Donald; Con: Donald (9); Pen: Donald (3)	Attendance: 7,685; Referee: Marius Jonker (South Africa)

This match set several new Super Rugby records including the highest aggregate score in a single match (137 points), highest score by an away side (72) and the most tries scored in a Super Rugby match (18).

20 February 2010	Hurricanes (New Zealand)	47–22	(Australia) Western Force	Westpac Stadium, Wellington
19:35	Try: D. Smith (2), Jane, Paterson, Tialata, Nonu, Keats; Con: Ripia, Weepu, Cruden; Pen: Ripia (2)	Report	Try: Tatupu, Haylett-Petty, O'Young; Con: O'Connor (2); Pen: O'Connor	Attendance: 11,880; Referee: Vinny Munro (New Zealand)

20 February 2010	Bulls (South Africa)	50–32	(Australia) Brumbies	Loftus Versfeld, Pretoria
17:05	Try: du Preez, Steyn (2), van den Heever, Olivier; Con: Steyn (5); Pen: Steyn (5)	Report	Try: Elsom, G. Smith, McCabe; Con: Mortlock; Pen: Mortlock (4); Drop: Giteau	Attendance: 31,569; Referee: Mark Lawrence (South Africa)

20 February 2010	Stormers (South Africa)	27–6	(Australia) Waratahs	Newlands Stadium, Cape Town
19:10	Try: Louw, Habana (2); Con: Pietersen (3); Pen: Pietersen (2)	Report	Pen: Barnes (2)	Attendance: 37,268; Referee: Keith Brown (New Zealand)

=== Round 3 ===
26 February 2010	Crusaders (New Zealand)	35–6	(South Africa) Sharks	AMI Stadium, Christchurch
19:35	Try: Guildford (2), A. Whitelock, MacDonald; Con: Carter (3); Pen: Carter (3)	Report	Pen: Kockott (2)	Attendance: 18,651; Referee: Chris Pollock (New Zealand)

26 February 2010	Stormers (South Africa)	17–19	(Australia) Brumbies	Newlands Stadium, Cape Town
19:10	Try: Louw; Pen: Pietersen (4)	Report	Try: Smith; Con: Giteau; Pen: Giteau (4)	Attendance: 38,367; Referee: Craig Joubert (South Africa)

27 February 2010	Hurricanes (New Zealand)	33–18	(South Africa) Lions	Westpac Stadium, Wellington
19:35	Try: Paterson, Weepu, Hore, D. Smith; Con: Ripia, Weepu; Pen: Ripia (3)	Report	Try: Minnie, Clever; Con: Rose; Pen: Rose (2)	Attendance: 12,550; Referee: Paul Marks (Australia)

27 February 2010	Reds (Australia)	18–27	(New Zealand) Blues	Ballymore, Brisbane
18:40	Try: Genia, Rounds; Con: Cooper; Pen: Cooper (2)	Report	Try: Ranger, Boric, Mathewson, Wulf; Con: Brett, Munro; Pen: Brett	Attendance: 15,681; Referee: Steve Walsh (Australia)

27 February 2010	Western Force (Australia)	19–37	(New Zealand) Chiefs	Members Equity Stadium, Perth
19:05	Try: Cross; Con: O'Connor; Pen: O'Connor (3), Sheehan	Report	Try: Elliot, Masaga, Bourke, Nanai-Williams; Con: Donald (4); Pen: Donald (3)	Attendance: 18,000; Referee: Jaco Peyper (South Africa)

27 February 2010	Cheetahs (South Africa)	24–31	(New Zealand) Highlanders	Vodacom Park, Bloemfontein
17:05	Try: Brüssow, Smith; Con: Olivier; Pen: Olivier (4)	Report	Try: Lynn, Vainikolo, Hobbs; Con: Hobbs, Dagg; Pen: Hobbs, Dagg (3)	Attendance: 13,166; Referee: Pro Legoete (South Africa)

27 February 2010	Bulls (South Africa)	48–38	(Australia) Waratahs	Loftus Versfeld, Pretoria
19:10	Try: Hougaard (2), Dippenaar, van den Heever, Olivier, Potgieter; Con: Steyn (6); Pen: Steyn (2)	Report	Try: Polota-Nau, Mowen, Turner, Mitchell; Con: Barnes (2), Beale; Pen: Barnes (3); Drop: Barnes	Attendance: 30,044; Referee: Marius Jonker (South Africa)

=== Round 4 ===
5 March 2010	Chiefs (New Zealand)	18–23	(Australia) Reds	Waikato Stadium, Hamilton
19:35	Try: Sivivatu, Masaga, Taumalolo; Pen: Donald	Report	Try: Chambers, Morahan; Con: Cooper (2); Pen: Cooper (3)	Attendance: 13,500; Referee: Chris Pollock (New Zealand)

5 March 2010	Brumbies (Australia)	24–13	(South Africa) Lions	Canberra Stadium, Canberra
19:40	Try: Lealiifano, Moore, Penalty Try; Con: Giteau (3); Pen: Giteau	Report	Try: Franklin; Con: Francis; Pen: Francis	Attendance: 13,177; Referee: Steve Walsh (Australia)

6 March 2010	Crusaders (New Zealand)	33–20	(New Zealand) Blues	AMI Stadium, Christchurch
19:35	Try: G. Whitelock, Crotty, Fruean; Con: Carter (3); Pen: Carter (4)	Report	Try: Mathewson; Pen: Brett (4); Drop: Brett	Attendance: 23,000; Referee: Keith Brown (New Zealand)

6 March 2010	Waratahs (Australia)	25–21	(South Africa) Sharks	Sydney Football Stadium, Sydney
19:40	Try: Halangahu, Carter, Polota-Nau; Con: Barnes, (2); Pen: Barnes (2)	Report	Try: Kankowski, Jacobs, Con: Goode, Pen: Pienaar, Goode; Drop: Goode	Attendance: 20,651; Referee: Paul Marks (Australia)

6 March 2010	Stormers (South Africa)	33–0	(New Zealand) Highlanders	Newlands Stadium, Cape Town
17:05	Try: D. Fourie, Burger, P. Louw, Habana; Con: Pietersen, Grant; Pen: Pietersen (3)	Report		Attendance: 36,527; Referee: Mark Lawrence (South Africa)

6 March 2010	Cheetahs (South Africa)	28–12	(New Zealand) Hurricanes	Vodacom Park, Bloemfontein
19:10	Try: Floors; Con: Olivier; Pen: Bosman (4), Olivier (3)	Report	Try: D. Smith, Jane; Con: Ripia	Attendance: 14,156; Referee: Bryce Lawrence (New Zealand)

=== Round 5 ===
12 March 2010	Chiefs (New Zealand)	19–26	(New Zealand) Crusaders	Waikato Stadium, Hamilton
19:35	Try: Kahui; Con: Donald; Pen: Donald (4)	Report	Try: Fotuali'i (2); Con: Carter (2); Pen: Carter (4)	Attendance: 17,800; Referee: Mark Lawrence (South Africa)

12 March 2010	Waratahs (Australia)	73–12	(South Africa) Lions	Sydney Football Stadium, Sydney
19:40	Try: Mitchell (4), Holmes (2), Turner (2), Carter, Mumm, Palu; Con: Barnes (9)	Report	Try: Chavhanga, van Rensburg; Con: Francis	Attendance: 16,878; Referee: Vinny Munro (New Zealand)

13 March 2010	Brumbies (Australia)	24–22	(South Africa) Sharks	Canberra Stadium, Canberra
19:40	Try: Alexander (2); Con: Giteau; Pen: Giteau (4)	Report	Try: Pienaar; Con: Goode; Pen: Goode (5)	Attendance: 15,227; Referee: Garratt Williamson (New Zealand)

13 March 2010	Bulls (South Africa)	50–35	(New Zealand) Highlanders	Loftus Versfeld, Pretoria
17:05	Try: Hougaard (2), Spies (2), Botha, van den Heever, Olivier; Con: Steyn (6); Pen: Steyn	Report	Try: Dagg (3), Boys, Robinson; Con: Berquist (4), Dagg	Attendance: 34,435; Referee: Jonathan Kaplan (South Africa)

13 March 2010	Stormers (South Africa)	37– 13	(New Zealand) Hurricanes	Newlands Stadium, Cape Town
19:10	Try: Naqelevuki, Pietersen, Fourie, Harris, Vermeulen; Con: Pietersen (3); Pen: Pietersen (2)	Report	Try: D.Smith, Keats; Pen: Ripia	Attendance: 44,500; Referee: Steve Walsh (Australia)

14 March 2010	Reds (Australia)	50–10	(Australia) Western Force	Suncorp Stadium, Brisbane
16:30	Try: Fainga'a (2), Ioane (2), Higginbotham (2), Morahan; Con: Cooper (5), Lucas; Pen: Cooper	Report	Try: Cross; Con: O' Connor; Pen: O' Connor	Attendance: 20,016; Referee: Ian Smith (Australia)

=== Round 6 ===
19 March 2010	Blues (New Zealand)	39–34	(Australia) Brumbies	Eden Park, Auckland
19:35	Try: Rokocoko (2), Ranger, Stanley, Toeava; Con: Brett (4); Pen: Brett; Drop: Brett	Report	Try: Ma'afu, Edmonds, Phibbs; Con: Giteau (2); Pen: Giteau (5)	Attendance: 16,000; Referee: Mark Lawrence (South Africa)

19 March 2010	Bulls (South Africa)	19–18	(New Zealand) Hurricanes	Loftus Versfeld, Pretoria
19:10	Try: Kirchner; Con: Steyn; Pen: Steyn (4)	Report	Try: Lowe, Thrush; Con: Ripia; Pen: Ripia (2)	Attendance: 37,104; Referee: Steve Walsh (Australia)

20 March 2010	Crusaders (New Zealand)	46–19	(South Africa) Lions	AMI Stadium, Christchurch
17:30	Try: Maitland (2), Poff, A. Whitelock, Heinz; Con: Slade (3); Pen: Slade (5)	Report	Try: Franklin; Con: Francis; Pen: Francis (3), Rose	Attendance: 20,096; Referee: Keith Brown (New Zealand)

20 March 2010	Highlanders (New Zealand)	16–30	(South Africa) Sharks	Carisbrook, Dunedin
19:35	Try: Smith; Con: Dagg; Pen: Dagg (3)	Report	Try: B. du Plessis, Terblanche, Jacobs; Con: Pienaar (3); Pen: Pienaar (3)	Attendance: 6,250; Referee: Jonathon White (New Zealand)

20 March 2010	Western Force (Australia)	10–14	(Australia) Waratahs	Members Equity Stadium, Perth
19:10	Try: Staniforth; Con: O'Connor; Pen: O'Connor	Report	Try: Mitchell; Pen: Barnes, Halangahu (2)	Attendance: 14,718; Referee: Jaco Peyper (South Africa)

20 March 2010	Stormers (South Africa)	21–8	(South Africa) Cheetahs	Newlands Stadium, Cape Town
17:05	Try: Pietersen, Fourie; Con: Pietersen; Pen: Pietersen (2), de Waal	Report	Try: Bosman; Drop: Olivier	Attendance: 43,089; Referee: Chris Pollock (New Zealand)

=== Round 7 ===
26 March 2010	Highlanders (New Zealand)	39–29	(South Africa) Lions	Carisbrook, Dunedin
19:35	Try: Triggs, Lynn, Penalty Try; Con: Dagg (3); Pen: Dagg (6)	Report	Try: Killian, Grobbelaar, Pekeur (2), Joubert; Con: Spencer, Rose	Attendance: 5,000; Referee: Stuart Dickinson (Australia)

26 March 2010	Brumbies (Australia)	30–23	(New Zealand) Chiefs	Canberra Stadium, Canberra
19:40	Try: Valentine, Hooper, To'omua; Con: Giteau (3); Pen: Giteau (3)	Report	Try: Leonard, Kahui; Con: Donald (2); Pen: Donald (3)	Attendance: 15,217; Referee: Jaco Peyper (South Africa)

26 March 2010	Cheetahs (South Africa)	10–31	(Australia) Reds	Vodacom Park, Bloemfontein
19:10	Try: Johnson; Con: Olivier; Pen: Bosman	Report	Try: Genia, Hynes, Ioane; Con: Cooper (2); Pen: Genia, Cooper (3)	Attendance: 13,452; Referee: Vinny Munro (New Zealand)

27 March 2010	Hurricanes (New Zealand)	26–29	(South Africa) Sharks	Westpac Stadium, Wellington
19:35	Try: Nonu, Vito; Con: Weepu (2); Pen: Ripia (2), Weepu (2)	Report	Try: Lambie, Pietersen; Con: Pienaar (2); Pen: Pienaar (5)	Attendance: 12,235; Referee: Ian Smith (Australia)

27 March 2010	Waratahs (Australia)	39–32	(New Zealand) Blues	Sydney Football Stadium, Sydney
19:40	Try: Mumm, Halangahu (2), Polota-Nau, Turner; Con: Halangahu (4); Pen: Halangahu (2)	Report	Try: Wulf, Toeava, Ranger (2); Con: Brett (3); Pen: Brett	Attendance: 20,413; Referee: Garratt Williamson (New Zealand)

27 March 2010	Western Force (Australia)	15–28	(South Africa) Bulls	Members Equity Stadium, Perth
19:10	Pen: O'Connor (5)	Report	Try: Spies, Steyn, Kirchner; Con: Steyn (2); Pen: Steyn (3)	Attendance: 15,678; Referee: Nathan Pearce (Australia)

=== Round 8 ===
2 April 2010	Hurricanes (New Zealand)	26–26	(New Zealand) Crusaders	Westpac Stadium, Wellington
19:35	Try: Nonu, Thrush; Con: Ripia (2); Pen: Weepu (4)	Report	Try: G. Whitelock, Guildford, Paulo; Con: Carter; Pen: Carter (3)	Attendance: 20,248; Referee: Jonathan Kaplan (South Africa)

2 April 2010	Western Force (Australia)	16–15	(South Africa) Stormers	Members Equity Stadium, Perth
18:05	Try: Pocock; Con: O'Connor; Pen: O'Connor (2); Drop: Hill	Report	Pen: Grant (5)	Attendance: 17,178; Referee: Stuart Dickinson (Australia)

3 April 2010	Blues (New Zealand)	32–17	(South Africa) Bulls	Eden Park, Auckland
17:30	Try: Toeava, Rokocoko; Con: Brett (2); Pen: Brett (6)	Report	Try: Spies; Pen: Steyn (3); Drop: Steyn	Attendance: 17,700; Referee: Craig Joubert (South Africa)

3 April 2010	Chiefs (New Zealand)	27–21	(New Zealand) Highlanders	Baypark Stadium, Mt Maunganui
19:35	Try: Donald, Lauaki, Taumalolo; Con: Donald (3); Pen: Donald (2)	Report	Try: Triggs, Vainikolo; Con: Dagg; Pen: Dagg (2); Drop: Robinson	Attendance: 11,000; Referee: Marius Jonker (South Africa)

3 April 2010	Waratahs (Australia)	40–17	(South Africa) Cheetahs	Sydney Football Stadium, Sydney
19:40	Try: Horne, Robinson, Baxter, Beale, Holmes; Con: Halangahu (2), Barnes; Pen: Halangahu (3)	Report	Try: Nel, Uys; Con: Bosman (2); Pen: Olivier	Attendance: 15,522; Referee: Keith Brown (New Zealand)

3 April 2010	Sharks (South Africa)	30–28	(Australia) Reds	Absa Stadium, Durban
17:05	Try: Ndungane, Botes, Pietersen; Con: Pienaar (3); Pen: Pienaar (3)	Report	Try: Cooper, Chambers (2), Holmes; Con: Cooper (4)	Attendance: 30,155; Referee: Chris Pollock (New Zealand)

=== Round 9 ===
9 April 2010	Chiefs (New Zealand)	19–33	(South Africa) Bulls	Waikato Stadium, Hamilton
19:35	Try: Leonard; Con: Donald; Pen: Donald (4)	Report	Try: van den Heever, Spies, Botha, D. Potgieter; Con: Steyn (2); Pen: Steyn (3)	Attendance: 12,900; Referee: Jonathan Kaplan (South Africa)

10 April 2010	Highlanders (New Zealand)	27–41	(Australia) Western Force	Queenstown Events Centre, Queenstown
14:30	Try: King, Setephano, Vainikolo; Pen: Berquist (4)	Report	Try: Shepherd (2), Cross (2), O'Connor, Turner; Con: O'Connor (4); Pen: O'Connor	Attendance: 5,800; Referee: Marius Jonker (South Africa)

10 April 2010	Blues (New Zealand)	21–33	(South Africa) Stormers	Eden Park, Auckland
17:30	Try: Lilo, McAlister, Rokocoko; Con: Brett (3)	Report	Try: Fourie, Duvehage, van Zyl; Con: Grant (3); Pen: Grant (4)	Attendance: 17,700; Referee: Stuart Dickinson (Australia)

10 April 2010	Crusaders (New Zealand)	20–13	(Australia) Waratahs	AMI Stadium, Christchurch
19:35	Try: Fotauli'i; Pen: Carter (5)	Report	Try: Horne; Con: Halangahu; Pen: Halangahu, Barnes	Attendance: 21,762; Referee: Craig Joubert (South Africa)

In this match, Dan Carter became the all-time leading points scorer in Super Rugby history.

10 April 2010	Brumbies (Australia)	61–15	(South Africa) Cheetahs	Canberra Stadium, Canberra
19:40	Try: Alexander (2), Hoiles, Phibbs, T. Smith, Elsom, Ashley-Cooper, To'omua, Mafi; Con: Giteau (6), Huxley (2)	Report	Try: Pretorius, Strauss; Con: Viljoen; Pen: Olivier	Attendance: 14,111; Referee: Bryce Lawrence (New Zealand)

10 April 2010	Lions (South Africa)	26–41	(Australia) Reds	Coca-Cola Park, Johannesburg
19:10	Try: Killian (2), F. van der Merwe, Kruger; Con: Kruger (3)	Report	Try: Davies (2), Cooper, Fainga'a, Hynes, Taylor; Con: Cooper (4); Pen: Cooper	Attendance: 12,268; Referee: Mark Lawrence (South Africa)

=== Round 10 ===
16 April 2010	Chiefs (New Zealand)	15–49	(South Africa) Stormers	Waikato Stadium, Hamilton
19:35	Try: Latimer, Nanai-Williams; Con: Donald; Pen: Donald	Report	Try: Habana, Vermeulen, Liebenberg, Naqelevuki, Bekker, D. Fourie; Con: Grant (4), De Waal; Pen: Grant (3)	Attendance: 11,000; Referee: Steve Walsh (Australia)

16 April 2010	Brumbies (Australia)	13–23	(New Zealand) Hurricanes	Canberra Stadium, Canberra
19:40	Try: Phibbs, Giteau; Pen: Giteau	Report	Try: C. Smith, Vito; Con: Cruden(2); Pen: Cruden(3)	Attendance: 14,825; Referee: Jonathan Kaplan (South Africa)

17 April 2010	Blues (New Zealand)	38–17	(Australia) Western Force	Eden Park, Auckland
17:30	Try: Rokocoko (3), Woodcock, Mathewson, Wulf; Con: McAlister (4)	Report	Try: Pocock, Penalty Try; Con: O'Connor (2); Pen: O'Connor	Attendance: 15,000; Referee: Keith Brown (New Zealand)

17 April 2010	Crusaders (New Zealand)	45–6	(South Africa) Cheetahs	AMI Stadium, Christchurch
19:35	Try: Fotuali'i, Crotty, Waldrom (2), Maitland, B. Franks, Guildford; Con: Slade (5)	Report	Pen: Viljoen (2)	Attendance: 15,856; Referee: Jonathon White (New Zealand)

17 April 2010	Reds (Australia)	19–12	(South Africa) Bulls	Suncorp Stadium, Brisbane
19:40	Try: Higginbotham, Davies; Pen: Cooper (3)	Report	Try: Kuun, Wannenburg; Con: Steyn	Attendance: 26,669; Referee: Craig Joubert (South Africa)

17 April 2010	Lions (South Africa)	28–32	(South Africa) Sharks	Coca-Cola Park, Johannesburg
17:05	Try: Killian, F. van der Merwe, Minnie; Con: Kruger (2); Pen: Kruger (3)	Report	Try: Lambie, Ndungane, B. du Plessis, Botes; Con: Pienaar (3); Pen: Pienaar (2)	Attendance: 24,387; Referee: Mark Lawrence (South Africa)

=== Round 11 ===
23 April 2010	Chiefs (New Zealand)	25–25	(South Africa) Cheetahs	Waikato Stadium, Hamilton
19:35	Try: Bourke, Sweeney, Smith, Elliot, Messam	Report	Try: Raubenheimer, Nel, Bosman; Con: Olivier (2); Pen: Olivier (2)	Attendance: 8,000; Referee: Bryce Lawrence (New Zealand)

23 April 2010	Reds (Australia)	16–13	(South Africa) Stormers	Suncorp Stadium, Brisbane
19:40	Try: Chambers; Con: Cooper; Pen: Cooper (3)	Report	Try: Bekker; Con: Grant; Pen: Grant (2)	Attendance: 30,259; Referee: Chris Pollock (New Zealand)

23 April 2010	Western Force (Australia)	24–16	(New Zealand) Crusaders	Members Equity Stadium, Perth
19:45	Try: Whittaker, Cowan, Hodgson; Con: Hill (3); Pen: Hill	Report	Try: Fotuali'i; Con: Carter; Pen: Carter; Drop: Fotuali'i, Carter	Attendance: 19,279; Referee: Jonathan Kaplan (South Africa)

24 April 2010	Highlanders (New Zealand)	31–33	(New Zealand) Hurricanes	Carisbrook, Dunedin
19:35	Try: Cowan, Soakai, Smith, Rutledge, Murray; Con: Dagg (3)	Report	Try: Lowe, Paterson, Keats, Cruden, Nonu; Con: Cruden (3), Weepu	Attendance: 6,750; Referee: Vinny Munro (New Zealand)

24 April 2010	Waratahs (Australia)	19–12	(Australia) Brumbies	ANZ Stadium, Sydney
19:40	Try: Turner; Con: Halangahu; Pen: Halangahu (4)	Report	Pen: Giteau (4)	Attendance: 40,271; Referee: Steve Walsh (Australia)

24 April 2010	Bulls (South Africa)	51–11	(South Africa) Lions	Loftus Versfeld, Pretoria
15:00	Try: Kuün, van den Heever (2), Steyn, Olivier, Mametsa; Con: Steyn (3); Pen: Steyn (5)	Report	Try: Mjekevu; Pen: Kruger (2)	Attendance: 24,638; Referee: Marius Jonker (South Africa)

24 April 2010	Sharks (South Africa)	23–10	(New Zealand) Blues	Absa Stadium, Durban
17:05	Try: Pienaar; Pen: Pienaar (2), Goode, Kockott (2); Drop: Pienaar	Report	Try: Saili; Con: Brett; Pen: Brett	Attendance: 26,415; Referee: Mark Lawrence (South Africa)

=== Round 12 ===
30 April 2010	Highlanders (New Zealand)	26–10	(Australia) Waratahs	Rugby Park Stadium, Invercargill
19:35	Try: Setephano, Thomson (2); Con: Dagg; Pen: Berquist (3)	Report	Try: Beale; Con: Halangahu; Pen: Halangahu	Attendance: 4,560; Referee: Bryce Lawrence (New Zealand)

30 April 2010	Stormers (South Africa)	42–14	(New Zealand) Crusaders	Newlands Stadium, Cape Town
19:10	Try: Fourie (2), Naqelevuki; Con: Grant (3); Pen: Grant (7)	Report	Try: Carter, Slade; Con: Carter (2)	Attendance: 48,184; Referee: Stuart Dickinson (Australia)

As a result of this match, the Stormers became the first South African team to beat every New Zealand based team in the regular Super 12/14 season.

1 May 2010	Hurricanes (New Zealand)	33–27	(New Zealand) Chiefs	Westpac Stadium, Wellington
19:35	Try: Jane, Nonu (2), Tialata; Con: Cruden, Weepu; Pen: Cruden (2), Weepu	Report	Try: Willison, Nanai-Williams, Taumalolo, Messam; Con: Bruce (2); Pen: Bruce	Attendance: 15,769; Referee: Keith Brown (New Zealand)

1 May 2010	Brumbies (Australia)	32–12	(Australia) Reds	Canberra Stadium, Canberra
19:40	Try: Alexander (2), Valentine, Chisholm; Con: Giteau (3); Pen: Giteau (2)	Report	Pen: Cooper (4)	Attendance: 18,023; Referee: Chris Pollock (New Zealand)

1 May 2010	Cheetahs (South Africa)	36–32	(New Zealand) Blues	Vodacom Park, Bloemfontein
15:00	Try: J. Smith, Nokwe, Basson, Van Der Walt, Vermeulen; Con: Olivier (2), Bosman (2); Pen: Olivier	Report	Try: Toeava, Ranger, Mathewson, Tuitavake; Con: Brett (3); Pen: Brett (2)	Attendance: 14,200; Referee: Marius Jonker (South Africa)

1 May 2010	Lions (South Africa)	12–33	(Australia) Western Force	Coca-Cola Park, Johannesburg
17:05	Pen: Kruger (4)	Report	Try: Staniforth, Hill, Bartholomeusz; Con: Hill (3); Pen: Hill (4)	Attendance: 5,118; Referee: Craig Joubert (South Africa)

1 May 2010	Bulls (South Africa)	27–19	(South Africa) Sharks	Loftus Versfeld, Pretoria
19:10	Try: Potgieter, van den Heever; Con: Steyn; Pen: Steyn (5)	Report	Try: Kockott; Con: Kockott; Pen: Goode (4)	Attendance: 50,000; Referee: Jonathan Kaplan (South Africa)

=== Round 13 ===
7 May 2010	Hurricanes (New Zealand)	44–21	(Australia) Reds	Westpac Stadium, Wellington
19:35	Try: Jane, Gear (3), Ellison, Smith; Con: Weepu (4); Pen: Weepu (2)	Report	Try: Higginbotham, Davies, Chambers; Con: Cooper (3)	Attendance: 17,044; Referee: Bryce Lawrence (New Zealand)

7 May 2010	Bulls (South Africa)	40–35	(New Zealand) Crusaders	Loftus Versfeld, Pretoria
19:10	Try: Hougaard (2), Matfield; Con: Steyn (2); Pen: Steyn (5); Drop: Steyn (2)	Report	Try: Thorn, Ellis, Maitland, Paulo; Con: Carter (3); Pen: Carter (2); Drop: Carter	Attendance: 32,245; Referee: Marius Jonker (South Africa)

8 May 2010	Chiefs (New Zealand)	19–46	(Australia) Waratahs	Waikato Stadium, Hamilton
19:35	Try: Nanai-Williams, Willison (2); Con: Bruce, Sweeney	Report	Try: Mitchell, Mowen, Polota-Nau, Barnes, Beale, Turner, Fitzpatrick; Con: Barnes (2), Halangahu (2); Pen: Barnes	Attendance: 7,200; Referee: Steve Walsh (Australia)

8 May 2010	Brumbies (Australia)	31–3	(New Zealand) Highlanders	Canberra Stadium, Canberra
19:40	Try: Elsom, Ma'afu, Valentine, To'omua; Con: Giteau (4); Pen: Giteau	Report	Pen: Dagg	Attendance: 16,217; Referee: Chris Pollock (New Zealand)

8 May 2010	Lions (South Africa)	14–56	(New Zealand) Blues	Coca-Cola Park, Johannesburg
15:00	Try: Spencer (2); Con: Kruger (2)	Report	Try: Ranger, Brett, Mathewson, Williams, McCartney, Rokocoko (2); Con: Brett (6); Pen: Brett (3)	Attendance: 3,527; Referee: Mark Lawrence (South Africa)

8 May 2010	Cheetahs (South Africa)	29–14	(Australia) Western Force	Vodacom Park, Bloemfontein
17:05	Try: Olivier, Pretorius, Basson (2); Con: Olivier (3); Pen: Olivier	Report	Try: Cross, Hodgson; Con: O'Connor	Attendance: 13,000; Referee: Craig Joubert (South Africa)

8 May 2010	Sharks (South Africa)	20–14	(South Africa) Stormers	Absa Stadium, Durban
19:10	Try: Ndungane, Pienaar; Con: Pienaar (2); Pen: Pienaar (2)	Report	Try: Grant, Louw; Con: Grant (2)	Attendance: 30,452; Referee: Stuart Dickinson (Australia)

=== Round 14 ===
14 May 2010	Crusaders (New Zealand)	40–22	(Australia) Brumbies	AMI Stadium, Christchurch
19:35	Try: Maitland, Read, Franks, McCaw, Guildford; Con: Carter (3); Pen: Carter (3)	Report	Try: T. Smith, Alexander, Edmonds; Con: Giteau (2); Pen: Giteau	Attendance: 29,292; Referee: Bryce Lawrence (New Zealand)

14 May 2010	Waratahs (Australia)	32– 16	(New Zealand) Hurricanes	Sydney Football Stadium, Sydney
19:40	Try: Mitchell (2), Beale (2); Con: Barnes (3); Pen: Barnes (2)	Report	Try: D. Smith; Con: Weepu; Pen: Weepu (3)	Attendance: 31,492; Referee: Chris Pollock (New Zealand)

14 May 2010	Sharks (South Africa)	27–22	(Australia) Western Force	Absa Stadium, Durban
19:10	Try: Mvovo, Kankowski, Botes; Con: Pienaar (3); Pen: Pienaar (2)	Report	Try: Cummins; Con: James O'Connor; Pen: Sheehan (2), O'Connor (3)	Attendance: 17,758; Referee: Pro Legoete (South Africa)

15 May 2010	Blues (New Zealand)	30–20	(New Zealand) Chiefs	Eden Park, Auckland
19:35	Try: Wulf (2), P. Williams, Stanley, Mathewson; Con: Brett; Pen: Brett	Report	Try: Messam, Tokula; Con: Renata (2); Pen: Renata (2)	Attendance: 17,500; Referee: Paul Marks (South Africa)

15 May 2010	Reds (Australia)	38–36	(New Zealand) Highlanders	Suncorp Stadium, Brisbane
19:40	Try: Ioane, Samo, Hynes, Cooper, Luafutu (2); Con: Cooper (4)	Report	Try: Dagg, King, Vainikolo (2), Rutledge; Con: Dagg (4); Pen: Dagg	Attendance: 26,700; Referee: Steve Walsh (Australia)

15 May 2010	Cheetahs (South Africa)	59–10	(South Africa) Lions	North West Stadium, Welkom
15:00	Try: Basson (2), Pretorius (2), Daniller (2), Uys, Oosthuizen, Pieterse; Con: Olivier (6), Strydom	Report	Try: Killian; Con: Kruger; Pen: Kruger	Attendance: 10,300; Referee: Craig Joubert (South Africa)

As a result of this match, the Lion holds the record for most losses in one season, with 13 straight losses. They also became the second team in Super Rugby history to lose all their round robin matches, joining the Bulls side of 2002.

15 May 2010	Stormers (South Africa)	38–10	(South Africa) Bulls	Newlands Stadium, Cape Town
17:05	Try: Habana (2), Bekker, Fourie; Con: Grant (3); Pen: Grant (4)	Report	Try: Snyman; Con: Brummer; Pen: Potgieter	Attendance: 48,739; Referee: Jonathan Kaplan (South Africa)

== Finals ==
=== Semi-finals ===
22 May 2010
17:05

Bulls (South Africa)	39–24	(New Zealand) Crusaders
Try: Spies, Kirchner, Du Preez; Con: Steyn (3); Pen: Steyn (6)	Report	Try: McCaw, Maitland, S. Whitelock; Con: Carter (3); Pen: Carter

Orlando Stadium, Soweto
Attendance: 38,534
Referee: Stuart Dickinson (Australia)

22 May 2010
19:10

Stormers (South Africa)	25–6	(Australia) Waratahs
Try: de Jongh; Con: Grant; Pen: Grant (6)	Report	Pen: Barnes; Drop: Barnes

Newlands Stadium, Cape Town
Attendance: 49,976
Referee: Mark Lawrence (South Africa)

=== Final ===
The Final of the 2010 Super 14 season took place on 29 May 2010 at Orlando Stadium in Soweto, South Africa. The Bulls, based in Pretoria, hosted the Stormers, from Cape Town, in the second all-South African final. The defending champion Bulls won 25–17 to claim their second consecutive title and third in four years. This was the last Super 14 final, as the Melbourne Rebels joined the Super Rugby competition in the 2011 season to create a new Super Rugby competition.

The Bulls' normal home, Loftus Versfeld, was unavailable because it was used as a venue for the 2010 FIFA World Cup being held in South Africa beginning 11 June. Under FIFA rules, all World Cup venues must be handed over to the local organisers no later than 15 days before the opening match of the competition. Orlando Stadium was the largest, suitable, stadium in the Bulls' home province of Gauteng that was not being used for the World Cup.

The game was surrounded in controversy after Schalk Burger claimed that the referee Craig Joubert was inconsistent at the breakdowns, "coaching the Bulls, but penalising the Stormers". This sparked an outcry over the handling of the game by Joubert, and internet blogs were buzzing due to the alleged incompetency of Joubert. André Watson, the head of South Africa's Rugby Referees, released a statement in which he defended Joubert's performance.

29 May 2010
17:05

Bulls (South Africa)	25–17	(South Africa) Stormers
Try: Hougaard 25' c Con: Steyn (1/1); Pen: Steyn (6/7) 9', 15', 20', 60', 71', 75'	Report	Try: Habana 53' c Louw 77' c Con: Grant (2/2); Pen: Grant (1/2) 30'

Orlando Stadium, Soweto
Attendance: 40,000
Referee: Craig Joubert (South Africa)

FB	15	Zane Kirchner
RW	14	Gerhard van den Heever
CT	13	Jaco Pretorius
SF	12	Wynand Olivier
LW	11	Francois Hougaard
FF	10	Morné Steyn
HB	9	Fourie du Preez
N8	8	Pierre Spies
OF	7	Dewald Potgieter
BF	6	Deon Stegmann
RL	5	Victor Matfield (Cpt)
LL	4	Danie Rossouw
TP	3	Werner Kruger
HK	2	Gary Botha
LP	1	Gurthro Steenkamp
Substitutes:
HK	16	Bandise Maku
LP	17	Bees Roux
N8	18	Flip van der Merwe
LF	19	Derick Kuun
HB	20	Jacques-Louis Potgieter
FF	21	Jaco van der Westhuyzen
RW	22	Pedrie Wannenburg
Coach:
(South Africa) Frans Ludeke

FB	15	Joe Pietersen
RW	14	Gio Aplon
CT	13	Jaque Fourie
CT	12	Juan de Jongh
LW	11	Bryan Habana
FH	10	Peter Grant
SH	9	Dewaldt Duvenhage
N8	8	Duane Vermeulen
OF	7	Francois Louw
BF	6	Schalk Burger (Cpt)
RL	5	Andries Bekker
LL	4	Adriaan Fondse
TP	3	Brok Harris
HK	2	Tiaan Liebenberg
LP	1	Wicus Blaauw
Substitutions:
HK	16	Deon Fourie
LP	17	JC Kritzinger
RL	18	Anton van Zyl
LF	19	Pieter Louw
SH	20	Ricky Januarie
FH	21	Willem de Waal
CT	22	Tim Whitehead
Coach:
(South Africa) Allister Coetzee

Touch judges:
Cobus Wessels (South Africa)
Christie du Preez (South Africa)
Television match official:
Shaun Veldsman (South Africa)

== Player statistics ==
=== Leading try scorers ===
Top try scorers
Pos	Name	Tries	Team
=1	Joe Rokocoko	9	(New Zealand) Blues
=1	Drew Mitchell	9	(Australia) Waratahs
3	Gerhard van den Heever	8	(South Africa) Bulls
=4	Jaque Fourie	7	(South Africa) Stormers
=4	Sean Maitland	7	(New Zealand) Crusaders
=4	Rene Ranger	7	(New Zealand) Blues
=4	Ben Alexander	7	(Australia) Brumbies
=4	David Smith	7	(New Zealand) Hurricanes
=4	Bryan Habana	7	(South Africa) Stormers
=10	Zac Guildford	6	(New Zealand) Crusaders
=10	Alby Mathewson	6	(New Zealand) Blues
=10	Ma'a Nonu	6	(New Zealand) Hurricanes
=10	Lachlan Turner	6	(Australia) Waratahs
=10	Michael Killian	6	(South Africa) Lions
=10	Pierre Spies	6	(South Africa) Bulls
=15	Richard Kahui	5	(New Zealand) Chiefs
=15	Kahn Fotuali'i	5	(New Zealand) Crusaders
=15	Morné Steyn	5	(South Africa) Bulls
=15	Wynand Olivier	5	(South Africa) Bulls
=19	13 Players	4	

=== Leading point scorers ===
Top 10 overall point scorers
Pos	Name	Points	Team
1	Morné Steyn	263	(South Africa) Bulls
2	Quade Cooper	169	(Australia) Reds
3	Dan Carter	153	(New Zealand) Crusaders
=4	Stephen Brett	141	(New Zealand) Blues
=4	Peter Grant	141	(South Africa) Stormers
6	Matt Giteau	136	(Australia) Brumbies
7	Stephen Donald	126	(New Zealand) Chiefs
8	Naas Olivier	114	(South Africa) Cheetahs
9	Israel Dagg	111	(New Zealand) Highlanders
10	Ruan Pienaar	104	(South Africa) Sharks

== Attendances ==
Team	Main Stadium	Capacity	Total Attendance	Average Attendance	% Capacity
(New Zealand) Blues	Eden Park	50,000	106,900	17,816	38%
(New Zealand) Chiefs	Waikato Stadium	25,800	81,400	11,628	46%
(New Zealand) Hurricanes	Westpac Stadium	34,500	89,726	14,954	43%
(New Zealand) Crusaders	Jade Stadium	36,500	151,450	21,635	59%
(New Zealand) Highlanders	Carisbrook	29,000	35,060	5,843	22%
(Australia) Reds	Suncorp Stadium	52,500	159,787	22,826	43%
(Australia) Brumbies	Canberra Stadium	25,011	106,797	15,256	61%
(Australia) Western Force	nib Stadium	20,500	102,121	17,020	83%
(Australia) Waratahs	Sydney Football Stadium	44,000	145,227	24,204	47%
(South Africa) Sharks	ABSA Stadium	52,000	154,002	25,667	49%
(South Africa) Bulls	Loftus Versfeld	51,762	318,569	35,396	72%
(South Africa) Lions	Ellis Park	62,567	66,835	11,139	17%
(South Africa) Cheetahs	Free State Stadium	46,000	100,384	14,340	35%
(South Africa) Stormers	Newlands Stadium	51,900	346,650	43,331	83%

== See also ==
- Super 14 franchise areas
- List of Super Rugby records
