= Jacques-Louis Potgieter =

South African rugby union player

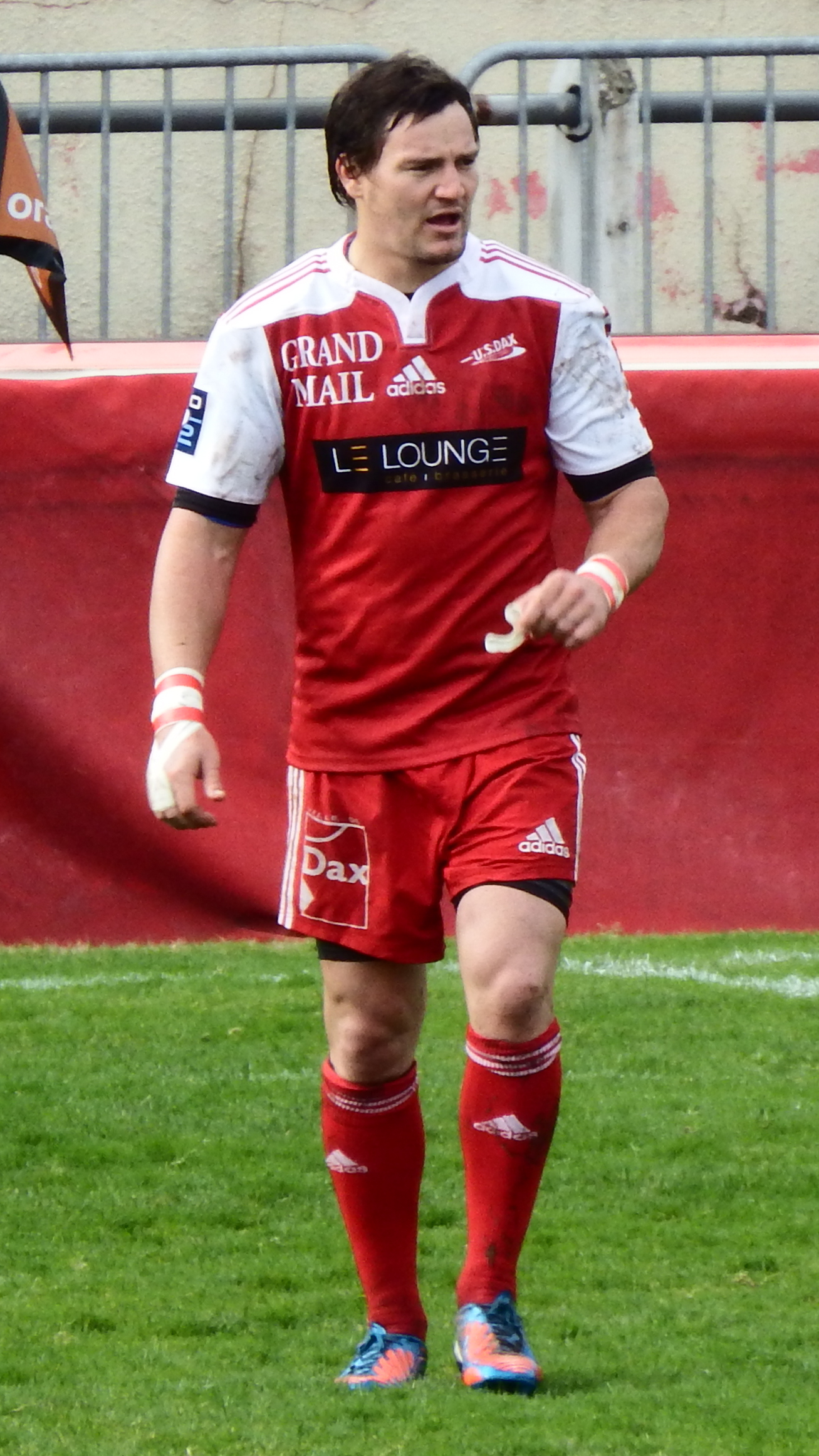
- Born: 2 September 1984 (age 42) Pretoria, South Africa
- Height: 1.78 m (5 ft 10 in)
- Weight: 89 kg (14 st 0 lb; 196 lb)
- School: Afrikaanse Hoër Seunskool

Rugby union career
- Position: Fly-half
- Current team: Perpignan
Youth career
- 2003: Leopards
- 2004–2005: Blue Bulls
Senior career
Years	Team	Apps	(Points)
2005–2007	Blue Bulls	41	(280)
2007	Bulls	1	(0)
2008–2009	Cheetahs	17	(85)
2008–2009	Free State Cheetahs	26	(245)
2008	→ Griffons	5	(79)
2010	Bulls	14	(15)
2010	Blue Bulls	15	(177)
2011	Sharks	10	(27)
2011	Sharks (Currie Cup)	6	(21)
2012–2013	Bayonne	31	(274)
2013–2014	Dax	16	(22)
2014–2015	Bulls	20	(186)
2014–2015	Blue Bulls	9	(123)
2015–2017	Lyon	31	(248)
2017–present	Perpignan	9	(73)
- Correct as of 30 December 2018

Jacques-Louis Potgieter (born 2 September 1984 in Pretoria) is a South African rugby union player, currently playing with French side Perpignan. His regular position is fly-half.

== Career ==
He made his Super 14 debut for the Bulls against the Cheetahs in 2007. In 2008 and 2009 he joined the Cheetahs, but was reunited with his Bulls team-mates in 2010. For the 2011 season, he joined the Sharks.

=== France ===
In January 2012, he signed for French Top 14 side Bayonne as a medical joker for the 2011–12 Top 14 season, then signed a one-year full-time contract for the 2012–13 Top 14 season.

Prior to the 2013–14 Rugby Pro D2 season, he joined Dax on a two-year deal, but gained an early release from this contract at the start of 2014.

=== Return to South Africa ===
He then returned to the Bulls prior to the 2014 Super Rugby season on a two-year contract, which he then extended until October 2016.

=== Return to France ===
Potgieter left the Blue Bulls after the 2015 Super Rugby season, joining French Top 14 side Lyon. After two seasons at Lyon, he joined their compatriots Perpignan on a three-year deal.

== Education ==
Potgieter attended Afrikaanse Hoër Seunskool (Afrikaans High School for Boys, also known as Affies), a public school located in Pretoria. He attended alongside former Bulls teammates Fourie du Preez, Wynand Olivier, Pierre Spies and Derick Kuun, Stormers lock Adriaan Fondse, former Stade Français lock Cliff Milton and Titans cricketers AB de Villiers, Heino Kuhn and Faf du Plessis.
