= Pierre Spies =

South African rugby union player

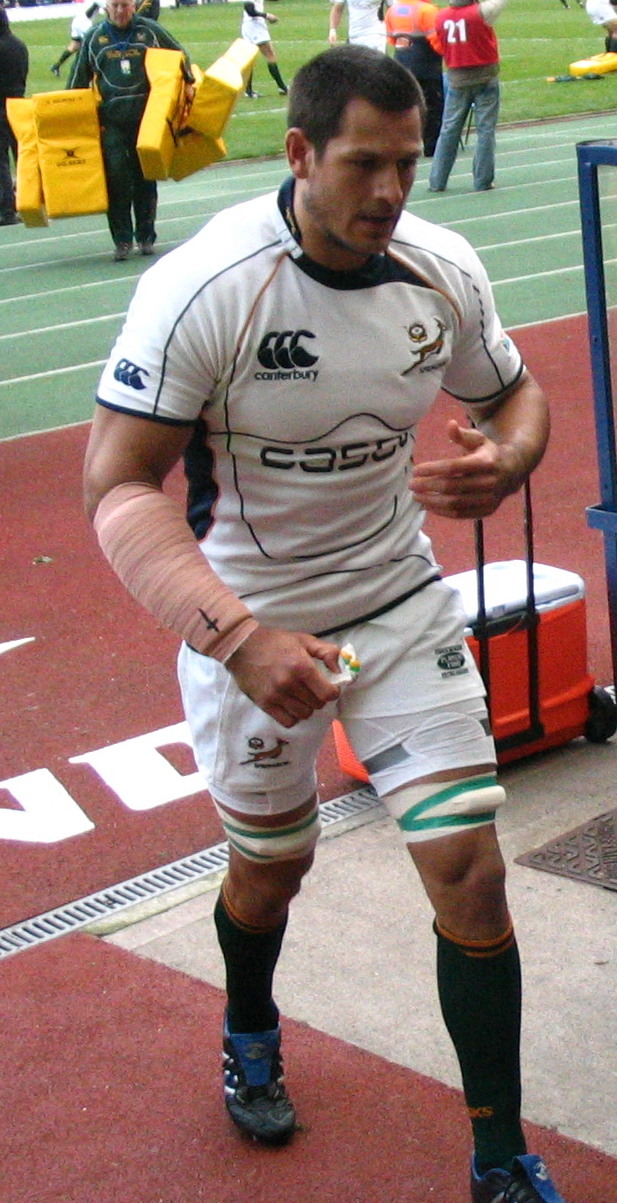
- Full name: Pierre Johan Spies
- Born: 8 June 1985 (age 41) Pretoria, South Africa
- Height: 1.94 m (6 ft 4 1/2 in)
- Weight: 116 kg (18 st 4 lb; 256 lb)
- School: Afrikaanse Hoër Seunskool
- University: University of Pretoria

Rugby union career
- Position: Number 8 / Flanker / Wing
Youth career
- 2005: Blue Bulls
Senior career
Years	Team	Apps	(Points)
2005–2010	Blue Bulls	17	(20)
2005–2015	Bulls	119	(145)
2015	Kintetsu Liners	8	(20)
2016–2017	Montpellier	34	(37)
- Correct as of 22 June 2017
International career
Years	Team	Apps	(Points)
2005	South Africa Students	1	(5)
2006	South Africa Under-21	4	(15)
2006–2013	South Africa	53	(35)
- Correct as of 14 June 2015

Pierre Johan Spies (born 8 June 1985 in Pretoria) is a retired South African rugby union player. He usually played as a Number 8, but could also play as a flanker and at times was deployed on the wing. Between 2005 and 2015, he spent the majority of his career playing Super Rugby for the Bulls and domestic South African rugby for the Blue Bulls, followed by stints in the Japanese and French rugby championships. He represented South Africa internationally between 2006 and 2013.

== Personal ==
Spies was born on 8 June 1985 in Pretoria and attended Afrikaanse Hoër Seunskool (Afrikaans High School for Boys, also known as Affies), a public school located in Pretoria. He attended alongside future Springbok teammates Fourie du Preez and Wynand Olivier, professional rugby players Derick Kuün, Jacques-Louis Potgieter, Gerhard van den Heever, Adriaan Fondse and cricketers AB de Villiers, Heino Kuhn and Faf du Plessis. After school, he completed his first year in B.Sc. Construction Management at the University of Pretoria.

He married Juanne Weidemann, in December 2008. Spies is a devout Christian, but although both his parents are ministers he only started practicing his faith when he was in his twenties.

== Rugby ==
He made his first class debut for the Blue Bulls in 2005 in a match against Griquas. He made his Super 12 debut against the Brumbies, becoming the youngest player ever to represent the Bulls. However, he picked up an injury in this match and reverted to the Blue Bulls U21 side, where he scored nine tries in six games in the 2005 Under-21 Provincial Championship.

After representing the South African Under-21 side at the 2006 Under 21 Rugby World Championship in France, Spies made his Springbok debut their 49–0 defeat at the hands of Australia in the 2006 Tri Nations Series. He was retained for the home leg of the tournament and turned in two "Man-of-the-Match" performances, in their wins over the New Zealand in Rustenburg and Australia in Durban.

He was injured in a match against Ireland on the Springboks' end of year tour, which ruled him out for the rest of the tour, as well as much of the 2007 Super 14 season, but he did make his comeback for the Bulls in their 49–12 victory over southern rivals the Stormers.

On 21 July 2007, Spies was selected in Jake White's Springbok squad for the 2007 Rugby World Cup to be played in France in September, but was forced to withdraw from the squad nine days later after blood clots were found in his lungs. After getting a second opinion, it was stated that Spies could return to the World Cup squad if a third opinion was positive. However, the third diagnosis confirmed the original one and Spies withdrew from the squad. He returned to the Springboks' team for the 2008 June internationals against Wales.

In domestic rugby, he was nominated for the 2008 Currie Cup Player of the Year, South African Player of the Year, International Player of the Year and won the award for South Africa's Most Promising Player of the Year and Sportsman of the Year.

In 2009, his performances in the Super 14 earned him a selection for the Springboks to play against the British & Irish Lions during their tour to South Africa. He was also selected for South Africa's end-of-year tour, but injured his finger and was ruled out.

In 2015, after having been released by the Bulls, Spies played a few matches with Japanese club Kintetsu Liners and then moved to top French club Montpellier Hérault Rugby, then coached by the Jake White.

In 2017, after his contract with Montpellier had not been renewed, Spies announced his decision to retire from rugby.

== Physical ==
As of 2009, Spies could power clean 135 kg, dead-lift 240 kg, bench-press 165 kg and do pull-ups with a 50 kg weight between his legs. He could jump 1.4m onto a raised platform and had a body-fat percentage of 6.5. He was "rumoured" to be able to run 100m in around 11seconds, his speed anyway so high to have been fielded on the wing at times.

Spies was credited with great strength, and pace for his size, but was criticised for a lack of physicality, especially if compared to fellow South African No.8 Duane Vermeulen Injuries hampered his later career.

He was in general regarded more suitable to break the defenders' line and play in the space than being the typical Springbok forward, menacing and physically imposing at the ruck.
