= Jean Cook =

Jean Cook(e) may refer to:

- Jean-Paul Cook (1927–2005), Canadian politician
- J. Lawrence Cook (1899–1976), American piano roll artist
- Jean Cook (fl. 2000s–2020s), violinist in Ida (band)
- Jean Cooke (1927–2008), English painter

== See also ==
- Gene Cook (1932–2002), American football player
