= Abraham J. Malherbe =

South African-American biblical scholar and theologian

Abraham J. Malherbe (May 15, 1930 - September 28, 2012) was a distinguished South African-American biblical scholar and theologian. He taught at Yale Divinity School from 1970 until 1994, and was named Buckingham Distinguished Professor of New Testament Criticism and Interpretation in 1981.

Malherbe was a prolific author and made major contributions in several areas. He is best known for his work in Hellenistic moral philosophy, especially Cynic philosophy and Graeco-Roman moral exhortation, and the ways in which it influenced the Pauline tradition and early Christianity more widely. His “Hellenistic Moralists and the New Testament” (ANRW) was the most cited forthcoming article in the history of New Testament studies.

== Publications ==
- The World of the New Testament (1967)
- The Cynic Epistles: A Study Edition (1977)
- Social Aspects of Early Christianity (1977, 1983)
- (ed., with Everett Ferguson) Gregory of Nyssa, Life of Moses: Translation, Introduction, and Notes (1978)
- Moral Exhortation: A Greco-Roman Sourcebook (1986)
- Paul and the Thessalonians: The Philosophic Tradition of Pastoral Care (1987)
- Ancient Epistolary Theorists (1988)
- Paul and the Popular Philosophers (1989)
- (ed.) The Future of Christology: essays in honor of Leander E. Keck (1993)
- (ed.) The Early Church in Its Context: essays in honor of Everett Ferguson (1998)
- The Letters to the Thessalonians. Anchor Yale Bible Commentary (2000)
- ("Hellenistic Moralists and the New Testament” (ANRW)
- Light from the Gentiles: Hellenistic Philosophy and Early Christianity: collected essays, 1959–2012 (E. J. Brill, 2013)

=== Festschriften ===
- Greeks, Romans, and Christians: essays in honor of Abraham J. Malherbe (1990)
- Early Christianity and Classical Culture: comparative studies in honor of Abraham J. Malherbe. Edited by John T Fitzgerald (2003)
- The New Testament in the Graeco-Roman World: articles in honour of Abe Malherbe (2015)
