= Wynand Olivier =

South Africa international rugby union player

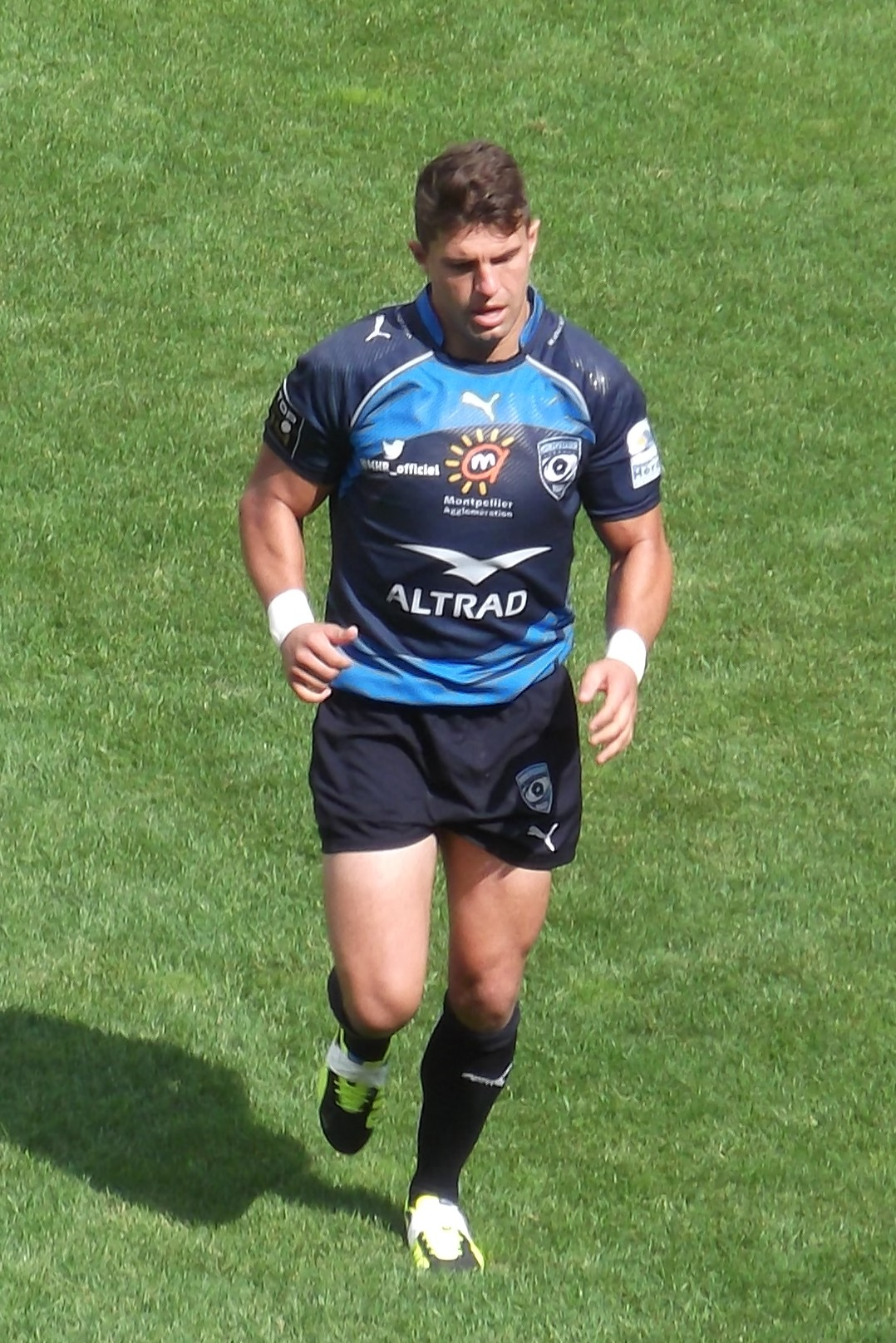
- Born: Wynand Olivier; 11 June 1983 (age 43) Welkom, South Africa
- Height: 1.86 m (6 ft 1 in)
- Weight: 93 kg (205 lb)
- School: Afrikaanse Hoër Seunskool
- University: University of Pretoria

Rugby union career
- Position: Centre
Senior career
Years	Team	Apps	(Points)
2012	Ricoh Black Rams	9	(5)
2013–2015	Montpellier	38	(30)
2015–2018	Worcester Warriors	16	(15)
- Correct as of 28 March 2015
Provincial / State sides
Years	Team	Apps	(Points)
2003–2012	Blue Bulls	72	(130)
Super Rugby
Years	Team	Apps	(Points)
2005–2013	Bulls	110	(145)
- Correct as of 19 February 2016
International career
Years	Team	Apps	(Points)
2006–2013	South Africa	38	(5)
- Correct as of 19 February 2016
Medal record
Men's Rugby union
Representing South Africa
Rugby World Cup
Gold medal – first place	2007 France	Squad

Wynand Olivier (born 11 June 1983) is a former South African professional rugby union player. His usual position was at centre.

== Career ==
Olivier made his provincial rugby debut for the Blue Bulls in the Currie Cup in a match against Boland in 2003. He made his debut in the Super 12 (now Super Rugby) competition in 2005, playing for the Bulls in a game against the Otago-based Highlanders. He was included in Jake White's 2006 Springboks 45-man training squad. Olivier made his test debut in the first test against Scotland in Durban in 2006 and was included in the Bok starting lineup for the tests against Scotland in Port Elizabeth and France in Cape Town. He was selected to tour with the Springboks as they started their Tri Nations quest in 2006.

Olivier has since further improved on his form and was an integral part of the Bulls' championship-winning team, proving to be Springbok material. Despite his match-winning qualities, he was second to Springbok veteran Adrian Jacobs in terms of consideration for the position of replacement centre for the Springboks.

In 2013, it was announced that he would leave the Bulls to join French Top 14 side Montpellier.

In 2015, it was announced that he will leave Montpellier to join English Aviva Premiership side Worcester Warriors.

== Education ==
Olivier attended Afrikaanse Hoër Seunskool (Afrikaans High School for Boys, also known as Affies), a public school located in Pretoria. He attended alongside Bulls teammates Derick Kuun, Pierre Spies, Jacques-Louis Potgieter and Springboks scrumhalf Fourie du Preez, Stormers lock Adriaan Fondse, former Stade Français lock Cliff Milton and Titans cricketers AB de Villiers, Heino Kuhn and Faf du Plessis.

== Accolades ==
In 2008 he was inducted into the University of Pretoria Sport Hall of fame.
