= Dean Greyling =

South African rugby union player

- Full name: MacGuyver Dean Greyling
- Born: 1 January 1986 (age 40) Potgietersrus, South Africa
- Height: 1.85 m (6 ft 1 in)
- Weight: 135 kg (298 lb; 21 st 4 lb)
- School: Afrikaanse Hoër Seunskool

Rugby union career
- Position: Loosehead Prop
- Current team: Oyonnax
Youth career
- 2004–2007: Blue Bulls
Senior career
Years	Team	Apps	(Points)
2005–2016	Blue Bulls	85	(50)
2008–2016	Bulls	67	(30)
2016–present	Oyonnax	0	(0)
- Correct as of 18 July 2016
International career
Years	Team	Apps	(Points)
2009	Southern Kings	1	(0)
2011–2012	South Africa	3	(0)
- Correct as of 1 August 2013

MacGuyver Dean Greyling (born 1 January 1986) is a rugby union player who represents Oyonnax in Pro Rugby D2. He was educated at Afrikaanse Hoër Seunskool.

== Playing career ==
Greyling was one of the stars of the 2004 Craven Week competition, and represented the Blue Bulls' age-group teams from 2005 to 2007. He made his Super Rugby debut for the franchise in 2008. In October 2010, Greyling was selected to the Springbok squad of 39 players to prepare for the November tour of Europe.

Greyling made his Springbok debut in the starting line-up against Australia on 23 July 2011 in Sydney. He played his second test for his country the following week against the All Blacks in Wellington. He was not selected for the 2011 Rugby World Cup.

He played in his last test (from the bench) on 15 September 2012 against New Zealand in Dunedin, but after receiving a yellow card for foul play in the 64th minute, was not selected again for the Springboks.

He moved to French team Oyonnax prior to the 2016–2017 season.

== Name ==
Born "Dean Greyling", he legally changed his name as a child to "Macguyver", as he was a fan of the TV character by that name, refusing to answer to "Dean". Though he hasn't legally changed his name back, he now goes by "Dean".
