= Adriaan Fondse =

South African rugby union player

- Born: Adriaan Rudolph Fondse; 9 June 1983 (age 43) Pretoria, South Africa
- Height: 1.96 m (6 ft 5 in)
- Weight: 116 kg (18 st 4 lb; 256 lb)
- School: Affies

Rugby union career
- Position: Lock
Senior career
Years	Team	Apps	(Points)
2011–2012	Newcastle Falcons		
- Correct as of 5 November 2011
Provincial / State sides
Years	Team	Apps	(Points)
2008–2011	Western Province	34	(30)
- Correct as of 11 February 2011
Super Rugby
Years	Team	Apps	(Points)
2008–2011	Stormers	30	(0)
- Correct as of 11 February 2011

Adriaan Fondse (born 9 June 1983) is a South African rugby union footballer formerly playing for Newcastle Falcons.

== Education ==
Fondse attended Afrikaanse Hoër Seunskool (Afrikaans High School for Boys, also known as Affies), a public school located in Pretoria. He attended alongside Bulls players Wynand Olivier, Pierre Spies, Fourie du Preez, Derick Kuun and Jacques-Louis Potgieter, Stade Français lock Cliff Milton and Titans Cricketers AB de Villiers, Heino Kuhn, Faf du Plessis and Jacques Rudolph.
