= Afrikaanse Hoër Seunskool =

Coordinates: 25°45′27″S 28°13′17″E

- Affies

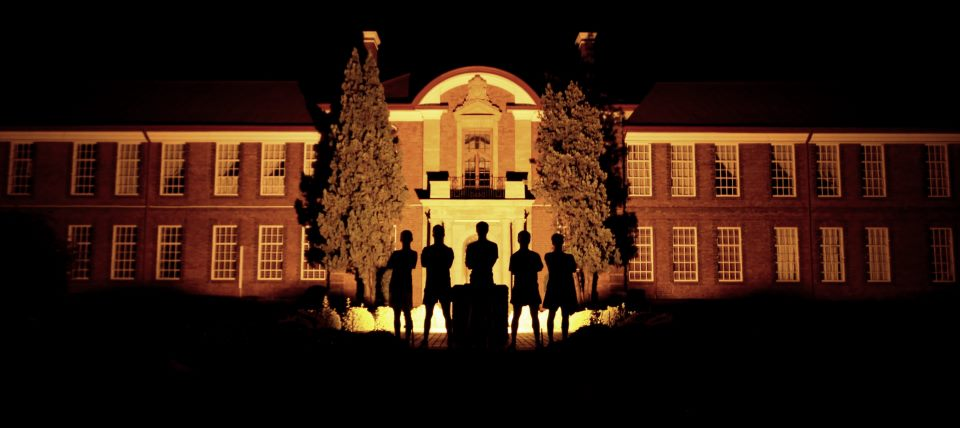

Location
- 1 Lynnwood Road, Pretoria, 0002; Pretoria, Gauteng; South Africa

Information
- School type: All-boys public school
- Motto: Laat daar lig wees (Let there be light)
- Religious affiliation: Christian
- Established: 28 January 1920; 106 years ago
- Founder: Jan Joubert and Chris Neethling
- Sister school: Afrikaanse Hoër Meisieskool (Separated in 1930)
- School number: 012 344 3810
- Headmaster: Peregrine Joynt
- Grades: 8–12
- Gender: Male
- Age: 14 to 18
- Enrollment: ca. 1,450
- Language: Afrikaans
- Schedule: 07:25 - 13:40
- Campus type: Suburban
- Houses: Day Houses; Hartebees; Elande; Koedoes; Hostels; Koshuis
- Colours: Red; Yellow; Green
- Mascot: White Brahman Bull - Only for rugby
- Nickname: Affies
- Rivals: Pretoria Boys High School (Historical); Grey College, Bloemfontein (Traditional); Paul Roos Gymnasium (Traditional); Paarl Gimnasium (Traditional)
- Accreditation: Gauteng Department of Education
- Newspaper: Stroom Op
- Yearbook: Die Lig
- School fees: R55 500 (boarding); R56 460 (tuition)
- Feeder schools: Laerskool Constantiapark; Laerskool Danie Malan; Laerskool Lynnwood; Laerskool Magalieskruin; Laerskool Menlopark; Laerskool Monumentpark; Laerskool Pretoria-Oos; Laerskool Tygerpoort; Laerskool Louis Leipoldt; Laerskool Skuilkrans; Laerskool Anton van Wouw; Waterkloof House Preparatory School; Laerskool Generaal Hendrik Schoeman
- Affiliation: Non-denominational
- Website: www.affies.com www.affiesaanlyn.co.za

Afrikaanse Hoër Seunskool (Afrikaans pronunciation: [afriˈkɑːnsə ˈhoɛ̩r ˈsyœnskuəl]; lit. 'African High School for Boy'; also known as Affies), is a public Afrikaans medium high school for boys situated in the suburb of Elandspoort in Pretoria in the Gauteng province of South Africa. The school was founded in 1920 by Jan Joubert and Reverend Chris Neethling.

== History ==
=== Early years (1920–1928) ===
The school's founding on 28 January 1920 marked the establishment of the first purely Afrikaans-medium high school in South Africa. The event predated the official recognition of the Afrikaans language by five years. With English as well as Dutch established as the official languages in South Africa, many of the Afrikaans-speaking population believed Afrikaans should also enjoy recognition. Afrikaans as language grew so fast that CJ Langenhoven tabled a motion in the Cape Provincial Council to slowly replace Dutch with Afrikaans. This thought was strongly supported by MP Jan Joubert and Chris Neethling. As leaders in the community they quickly organized a group to establish a purely Afrikaans school in Pretoria.

On 27 January 1920, the first acting head, Johannes Arnoldus Kruger de Lange received the new pupils. The first enrolment was a boy named Frederik Botha. There were 35 pupils in form II (grade 9) and 10 in form III (grade 10); 45 in total. De Lange was supported by DJ (Dawie) Malan and MM de Vos who were joined on 11 February by HCP Sack. De Lange later became head at the Commercial Branch at the Pretoria Technical College.

The school with 45 children and 3 teachers was housed in the home of General Piet Joubert at 218 Visagie Street, Central Pretoria.

=== Current building (1927) ===
By 1927, the school had grown and new premises were required. The school was therefore moved eastward to the current premises of the Afrikaanse Hoër Meisieskool, Affies sister-school. At the end of 1927, the school took over the Hogere Oosteindschool, a Dutch-medium instruction school, suggestive of the demise of Dutch as a language in South Africa and the assumption of Afrikaans as the primary instruction medium.

=== Present (1928–) ===
By 1929 this building had also run out of space and the decision was made to split the boys and girls into separate schools, thus creating the first separate Afrikaans boys' and girls' schools in South Africa. These two schools are now situated opposite each other in Lynnwood Road.

== Headmasters ==
List of the headmasters of Afrikaanse Hoër Seunskool.

Name	Started	Finished	Years
F.J. le Roux	1920	1946	26
Dr. G.J. Potgieter	1947	1963	16
J.A. Fourie	1964	1968	4
J.D.V Terblanche	1970	1973	3
N.C. Roesch	1974	1984	10
T.L.P. Kruger	1985	1991	6
Dr. P. Edwards	1992	2018	26
P. W. Joynt	2019	present	7+

== Notable alumni ==
=== Rugby ===
- Louis Schmidt (1954): Springbok rugby player 1958 to 1962, and the original Blue Bull;
- Tonie Roux (1964): Springbok rugby player 1969 to 1974;
- Grant Esterhuizen (1994): Springbok rugby player 2000
- Skipper Badenhorst (1996): Natal Sharks / SA Under 21 / Cheetahs Super 14 rugby player
- Nicolaas Alberts (1996): Springbok Sevens Rugby Player and Cambridge University Triple Blue (Rugby, Cricket and Athletics)
- Johann van Graan (1998): Former Springbok forwards coach and Munster Rugby head coach; current Bath head coach
- Fourie du Preez (2000): Springbok rugby player 2004-2015 and Springbok Captain
- Wynand Olivier (2001): Springbok rugby player 2006–2013
- Pierre Spies (2003): Springbok rugby player 2006–2013
- Dean Greyling (2004): Springbok rugby player 2011–2012
- Gerhard van den Heever (2007): Japanese rugby union player
- Quinn Roux (2008): Ireland International Rugby 2016-;
- Andries Ferreira (2008): South African professional rugby player
- Willie du Plessis (2008): Dutch international rugby player
- Nico Janse van Rensburg (2012): Springbok rugby player 2021-
- Pierre Schoeman (2012): Scottish rugby player 2021-
- Ivan van Zyl (2013): Springbok rugby player 2018-
- RG Snyman (2013): Springbok rugby player
- Ruben van Heerden (2015): South African rugby player
- Schalk Erasmus (2016): Springbok rugby union player
- Reinhardt Ludwig (2020): u21 Springbok rugby player 2022-
- Quewin Nortje (2021): u21 Springbok rugby Player; Springbok Sevens; Olympic bronze medalist

=== Cricket ===
- Kruger Van Wyk (1998): Titans, South Africa A and New Zealand Black Caps cricket player
- Jacques Rudolph (1999): South African international cricket player 2003 to 2011
- AB de Villiers (2002): South African national cricket team player
- Francois du Plessis (2002): South African national cricket team player
- Heino Kuhn (2002): Titans and South Africa cricket player
- Neil Wagner (2004): New Zealand Black Caps cricket player
- Sybrand Engelbrecht (2006): Netherlands cricket player
- Ruben Trumpelmann (2016): Namibia cricket player
- Ruan De Swardt (2016): South African national cricket player
- Dewald Brevis (2021): South African national cricket player

=== Golf ===
- George Coetzee (2004): South African professional golfer

=== Tennis ===
- Rayno Seegers (1970): South African tennis player, mixed doubles Wimbledon quarter-finalist
- Johan Kriek (1976): South African tennis player, twice winner of Australian Open singles title
- Danie Visser (1979): South African tennis player, three times Grand Slam doubles winner

=== Other sports ===
- Sebastiaan Rothmann (1993): IBO and WBO cruiser weight boxing champion
- Jacques Freitag (2000): South African Olympic high jumper
- Lehann Fourie (2005): South African hurdler.
- Gerhard de Beer (c. 2015): South African American football player
- Ntando Mahlangu (2021): South African Paralympic athlete, two time Paralympic gold medalist

=== Academics ===
- D. C. S. Oosthuizen: philosopher, critic of Apartheid
- Hans du Plessis (1962): Afrikaans writer and poet, Emeritus Professor at Northwest University, Potchefstroom;
- Fransjohan Pretorius (1966): South African historian and professor emeritus of History at the University of Pretoria;
- Pierre Edwards (1970) : Springbok rugby player 1980, the former headmaster
- Abraham J. Malherbe Theologian, Professor at Yale

=== Politics ===
- Magnus Malan: Minister of Defence (1980–1991);
- Gerrit Viljoen: Minister of Education and Minister of Constitutional Development;

=== Arts ===
- Marius Weyers (1962): South African actor;
- Ben Schoeman (2001): South African pianist
- Christoph Kotzé (Appel) (2005): South African songwriter and recording artist
- Zaan Sonnekus (2016): Musician
- Chris Steyn (2022): South African singer; Die Kontrak Winner

=== Business ===
- Giam Swiegers: businessperson
- Markus Jooste
- Meyer Le Roux - Buffelsfontein
