= Gerhard van den Heever =

Japan international rugby union player

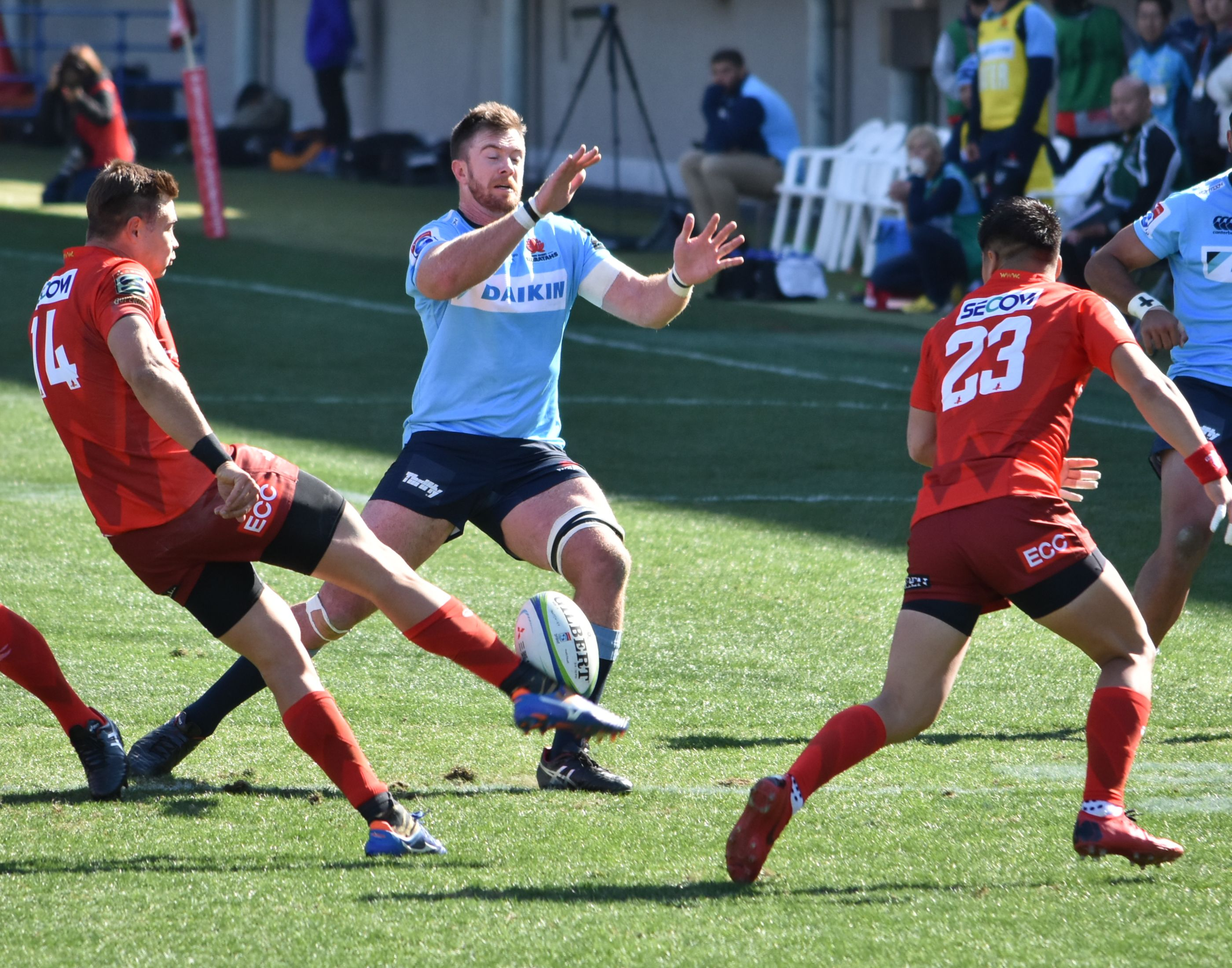
- Full name: Gerhard Jacobus van den Heever
- Born: 13 April 1989 (age 37) Bloemfontein, South Africa
- Height: 1.91 m (6 ft 3 in)
- Weight: 105 kg (16.5 st; 231 lb)
- School: Afrikaanse Hoër Seunskool
- University: University of Pretoria

Rugby union career
- Position(s): Wing, Fullback
Youth career
- 2005–2010: Blue Bulls
Senior career
Years	Team	Apps	(Points)
2009–2011	Bulls	31	(60)
2009–2011	Blue Bulls	41	(95)
2012–2013	Stormers	26	(10)
2012–2013	Western Province	24	(15)
2013–2016	Munster	29	(30)
2016–2018	Yamaha Júbilo	22	(203)
2018–2019	Sunwolves	18	(35)
2018–2026	Kubota Spears	83	(391)
- Correct as of 21 February 2021
International career
Years	Team	Apps	(Points)
2009	South Africa Under-20	4	(15)
2021–2022	Japan	5	(5)
- Correct as of 7 June 2018

Gerhard Jacobus van den Heever (born 13 April 1989) is a South African-born Japanese rugby union player for the Sunwolves in Super Rugby and Kubota Spears in the Top League. His regular playing position is as a wing.

== Education ==
Van den Heever attended Afrikaanse Hoër Seunskool (Afrikaans High School for Boys, known as Affies), in Pretoria — a school that produced several sports stars such as Bulls players Derick Kuun, Pierre Spies and Jacques-Louis Potgieter and Titans cricketers AB de Villiers, Heino Kuhn and Faf du Plessis. He played in the University Seven's Rugby World Championships for the University of Pretoria.

== Bulls ==
In early 2010, Van den Heever inherited Bryan Habana's number 11 shirt in the Bulls team after Habana's departure for the Stormers; Van den Heever is said to be even quicker than Habana.

== Stormers ==
On 24 October 2011, Van den Heever left the Bulls to join the Stormers and Western Province.

== Munster ==
Van den Heever agreed to join Irish side Munster on a two-year contract after the 2013 Currie Cup Premier Division. He arrived in Cork to join up with Munster on 5 November 2013. He made his debut for Munster on 29 November 2013, starting against Newport Gwent Dragons in the Pro12, but sustained a broken bone in his hand during the game. Van den Heever scored his first try for Munster in their 54–13 win against Cardiff Blues on 8 February 2014. He was added to Munster's 2013–14 Heineken Cup squad on 20 March 2014. He made his Heineken Cup debut on 5 April 2014, coming on against Toulouse in Munster's quarter-final. In May 2016, it was announced that Van den Heever would be leaving Munster.

== Yamaha Júbilo ==
After leaving Munster, Van den Heever played for Japanese Top League side Yamaha Júbilo from 2016 to early 2018.

== Achievements ==
- 2009 Currie Cup winner with the Blue Bulls
- 2010 Super Rugby winner with the Bulls
- 2012 Currie Cup winner with Western Province
