= Derick Kuün =

South African rugby union player

- Born: 8 June 1984 (age 42)
- Height: 1.84 m (6 ft 1/2 in)
- Weight: 106 kg (16 st 10 lb)
- School: Afrikaanse Hoër Seunskool

Rugby union career
- Position: Hooker / Flanker
Provincial / State sides
Years	Team	Apps	(Points)
2004–11	Blue Bulls	75	(135)
Super Rugby
Years	Team	Apps	(Points)
2007–11	Bulls	66	(40)
National sevens team
Years	Team		Comps
2005	South Africa		

Derick Kuün (born 8 June 1984) is a South African former professional rugby union player.

== Biography ==
A Afrikaanse Hoër Seunskool product, Kuün captained South Africa Schools and represented his country in three editions of the IRB Junior World Championships. He made his Currie Cup debut for the Blue Bulls in 2004 and the following year competed for the Blitzboks during the 2004–05 World Sevens Series.

Kuün was a hooker on the Bulls Super 14 team from 2007 to 2011, featuring in their 2007, 2009 and 2010 championship-winning sides. He captained the Southern Kings in a tour match against the 2009 British & Irish Lions. At the end of the 2011 season, Kuün retired from professional rugby to operate his family farming business.
