= 2009 Currie Cup Premier Division =

Domestic rugby union competition

- Champions: Blue Bulls
- Matches played: 63
- Tries scored: 354 (average 5.6 per match)
- Top point scorer: Naas Olivier, Griquas (151)
- Top try scorer: Jongi Nokwe, Free State Cheetahs (12)

The 2009 Absa Currie Cup Premier Division season was the 71st season in the competition since it started in 1889. The competition was contested from 10 July through to 31 October.

It was won by the Blue Bulls, who defeated the Free State Cheetahs 36-24 in the final at Loftus Versfeld. The Boland Cavaliers, who finished bottom of the Premier Division, were relegated after losing their promotion-relegation playoff to the First Division Champions, the Pumas, while the Leopards, who finished second from bottom in the Premier Division, narrowly retained their place in the top division after defeating the South Western District Eagles in the other playoff.

== Final standings ==
2009 Absa Currie Cup Premier Div
Team	Pld	W	D	L	PF	PA	PD	TF	TA	B	Pts
Sharks	14	12	0	2	424	231	+193	48	21	6	54
Western Province	14	10	0	4	445	226	+219	51	19	10	50
Blue Bulls	14	9	0	5	475	299	+176	56	28	10	46
Free State Cheetahs	14	8	0	6	485	280	+205	61	28	8	40
Griquas	14	8	0	6	404	447	−43	50	52	8	40
Golden Lions	14	7	0	7	391	292	+99	43	26	9	37
Leopards	14	1	0	13	258	582	−324	27	79	2	6
Boland Cavaliers	14	1	0	13	179	704	−525	18	101	1	5

Updated to match(es) played on 10 October 2009. Source:
Rules for classification: Four points for a win; Two points for a draw; One bonus point for a loss by seven points or less; One bonus point for scoring four or more tries in a match

== Teams ==
Team	City	Home Ground
Blue Bulls	Pretoria	Loftus Versfeld
Boland Cavaliers	Wellington	Boland Stadium
Free State Cheetahs	Bloemfontein	Vodacom Park
Golden Lions	Johannesburg	Coca-Cola Park
Griquas	Kimberley	Park
Leopards	Phokeng	Royal Bafokeng Sports Palace
Sharks	Durban	Absa Stadium
Western Province	Cape Town	Newlands Stadium

== Fixtures and results ==
- Fixtures are subject to change.
- All times are South African (GMT+2).

== Compulsory Friendlies ==
15:00 2009-06-06

Mighty Elephants	10 – 72	Western Province
	Scoreboard

EPRFU Stadium, Port Elizabeth

15:00 2009-06-26

Falcons	20 – 67	Griquas
	Scoreboard

Barnard Stadium, Kempton Park

19:00 2009-06-26

SWD Eagles	15 – 42	Free State Cheetahs
	Scoreboard

Outeniqua Park, George

19:05 2009-07-01

Border Bulldogs	0 – 58	Blue Bulls
	Scoreboard

Border Rugby Stadium, East London

15:00 2009-07-03

Griffons	7 – 54	Golden Lions
	Scoreboard

North West Stadium, Welkom

== Round One ==
15:30 2009-07-10

Boland Cavaliers	26 – 18	Leopards
Tries: D. Scholtz 28' c M. Hugo 31' c Con: J. Peach (2/2); Pen: J. Peach (4/5) 12', 19', 25', 48'; Cards: D. Scholtz (yellow card) 2' to 12'; W. Wehr (yellow card) 72'	Scoreboard	Tries: M. Bondesio 9' m S. Samaai 55' m, 75' m Pen: C. Durand (1/3) 24'; Cards: B. Van der Walt (yellow card) 25' to 35'

Boland Stadium, Wellington
Attendance: 850

19:10 2009-07-10

Free State Cheetahs	18 – 28	Griquas
Tries: L. Mapoe 50' m W. P. Nel 56' c Con: L. Strydom (1/2); Pen: J. Potgieter (2/4) 31', 40'	Scoreboard	Tries: H. Stride 12' c S. Pretorius 58' c B.Geel 64' c B. Basson 76' c Con: N. Olivier (4/4); Card: S. Pretorius (yellow card) 43' to 53'

Vodacom Park, Bloemfontein
Attendance: 12,870
Referee: Phillip Anthony Bosch

15:00 2009-07-11

Blue Bulls	19 – 13	Golden Lions
Tries: T. Mangweni 48' m G. van der Heever 55' m Pen: F. Brummer (3/4) 62', 70', 79'	Scoreboard; Report	Tries: W. Alberts 10' c Con: H. Kruger (1/1); Pen: H. Kruger (2/4) 2', 23'; Cards: R. Kruger (yellow card) 69' to 79'

Loftus Versfeld, Pretoria
Attendance: 16,865

17:05 2009-07-11

Western Province	29 – 15	Sharks
Tries: C. Jack 1' c S. Naqelevuki 48' c Con: W. de Waal (2/2); Pen: W. de Waal (5/6) 15', 33', 38', 51', 74'	Scoreboard	Pen: R. Kockott (5/7) 8', 17', 26', 29', 53'; Cards: K. Daniel (yellow card) 43' to 53'

Newlands Stadium, Cape Town
Attendance: 22,488

=== Round One Summary ===
- The Boland Cavaliers held off the fast finishing Leopards to claim a 26-18 win in their Absa Currie Cup Premier Division match at Boland Stadium in Wellington on Friday 10 July.
- Griquas showed plenty of fight and spirit as they registered a fine 28-18 victory over the Free State Cheetahs in a thrilling Absa Currie Cup match in Bloemfontein on Friday 10 July.
- The Blue Bulls overcame a spirited Golden Lions' side to triumph 19-13 in a scrappy Absa Currie Cup match at Loftus Versfeld in Pretoria on Saturday 11 July.
- Flyhalf Willem de Waal scored 19 points to steer Western Province to a comfortable 29-15 win over defending ABSA Currie Cup champions the Sharks at Newlands on Saturday 11 July.

=== Standings Afters Round One ===
Team	Pld	W	D	L	PF	PA	PD	TF	TA	B	Pts
Griquas	1	1	0	0	28	18	+10	4	2	1	5
Western Province	1	1	0	0	29	15	+14	2	0	0	4
Boland Cavaliers	1	1	0	0	26	18	+8	2	3	0	4
Blue Bulls	1	1	0	0	19	13	+6	2	1	0	4
Golden Lions	1	0	0	1	13	19	−6	1	2	1	1
Leopards	1	0	0	1	18	26	−8	3	2	0	0
Free State Cheetahs	1	0	0	1	18	28	−10	2	4	0	0
Sharks	1	0	0	1	15	29	−14	0	2	0	0

== Round Two ==
19:10 2009-07-17

Sharks	46 – 10	Boland Cavaliers
Tries: R. Swanepoel 1' c D. Carstens 22'm C. Burden 30' c, 50' m K. Daniel 39' c, 43' m A. van den Berg 82' c Con: R. Kockott (3/5); M. Dumond (1/1); Pen: R. Kockott (1/1) 19'; Cards: G. Cronje (yellow card) 60' to 70'	Scoreboard	Tries: D. Scholz 67' c Con: M. Harris (1/1); Pen: J. Peach (1/2) 10'

ABSA Stadium, Durban
Referee: Johannes (Joey) Salmans

15:00 2009-07-18

Golden Lions	31 – 22	Free State Cheetahs
Tries: W. Venter 33' c J. Jackson 76' m J. Vermaak 80' c Con: H. Kruger (2/3); Pen: H. Kruger (4/5) 36', 40', 45', 72'; Cards: W. Albers (yellow card) 42' to 52'	Scoreboard	Tries: W. du Preez 18' c Con: JL. Potgieter (1/1); Pen: JL. Potgieter (4/5) 12', 24', 30', 55'; DG: JL. Potgieter (1/2) 27'

Coca-Cola Park, Johannesburg
Attendance: 11,250
Referee: Stuart Berry

15:00 2009-07-18

Griquas	36 – 11	Leopards
Tries: E. Seconds 31' m S. Pretorius 39' m, 61' c R. Kitshoff 76' c Con: N. Olivier (2/4); Pen: N. Olivier (3/3) 4', 25', 45'; DG: R. Viljoen (1/1) 35'	Scoreboard	Tries: R. Jeacocks 13' m Pen: Clayton Durand (2/2) 1', 47'

Park, Kimberley
Referee: Jaco Peyper

17:05 2009-07-18

Blue Bulls	30 – 22	Western Province
Tries: G. van den Heever 5' c, 29' c G. Steenkamp 46' c Con: F. Brummer (3/3); Pen: F. Brummer (2/2) '40+1, 73'; DG: F. Brummer (1/2) 42'	Scoreboard Report	Tries: L. Watson 53' c Con: W. de Waal (1/1); Pen: W. de Waal (5/5) 3', 12', 35', 38', 73'

Loftus Versfeld, Pretoria
Attendance: 24,450
Referee: Mark Lawrence

=== Round Two Summary ===
- The Sharks dismantled a gallant Boland Cavaliers side to record a 46-10 victory in their Absa Currie Cup match at the Absa Stadium in Durban on Friday 17 July.
- The roar is back in the Golden Lions team as they mounted a spirited comeback to beat the Free State Cheetahs 31-22 at Coca-Cola Park in Johannesburg on Saturday 18 July.
- Scrum-half Sarel Pretorius scored two tries and continued to push for selection to higher honours as he steered Griquas to a 36-11 victory over the Leopards in their Absa Currie Cup match in Kimberley on Saturday 18 July.
- The Blue Bulls held off a spirited Western Province to triumph 30-22 in their Absa Currie Cup match at Loftus Versfeld in Pretoria on Saturday 18 July.

=== Standings Afters Round Two ===
Team	Pld	W	D	L	PF	PA	PD	TF	TA	B	Pts
Griquas	2	2	0	0	64	29	+35	8	3	2	10
Blue Bulls	2	2	0	0	49	35	+14	5	2	0	8
Sharks	2	1	0	1	61	39	+22	7	3	1	5
Golden Lions	2	1	0	1	44	41	+3	4	3	1	5
Western Province	2	1	0	1	51	45	+6	3	3	0	4
Boland Cavaliers	2	1	0	1	36	64	−28	3	10	0	4
Free State Cheetahs	2	0	0	2	40	59	−19	3	7	0	0
Leopards	2	0	0	2	29	62	−33	4	6	0	0

== Round Three ==
18:00 2009-07-24

Sharks	19 – 13	Blue Bulls
Tries: S. Badenhorst 71' c Con: R. Kockott (1/1); Pen: R. Kockott (3/3) 12', 25', 68'; DG: R. Swanepoel (1/1) 3'; Cards: A. van den Berg (yellow card) 32' to 42'; J. Botes (yellow card) 52' to 62'; S. Badenhorst (yellow card) 73' to 80'	Scoreboard; Report	Tries: D. Potgieter 80' c Con: F. Brummer (1/1); Pen: F. Brummer (2/2) 21', 62'

ABSA Stadium, Durban
Attendance: 21,654
Referee: Mark Lawrence

19:00 2009-07-24

Western Province	19 – 13	Free State Cheetahs
Tries: S. Naqelevuki 55' c Con: W. de Waal (1/1); Pen: W. de Waal (4/5) 3', 8', 22', 39'	Scoreboard	Tries: R. Strauss 74' c Con: JL. Potgieter (1/1); Pen: PJ. Wessels (1/1) 5'; JL. Potgieter (1/1) 19'

Newlands Stadium, Cape Town
Attendance: 20,085
Referee: Phillip Anthony Bosch

14:30 2009-07-25

Griquas	80 – 7	Boland Cavaliers
Tries: J. Mokuena 5' m R. Kitshoff 17' c 77' c B. Geel 28' c B. Basson 31' c, 57' m, 73' c A. Buckle 38' c J. Lombaard 43' c D. Pretorius 47' c N. Olivier 51' c W. Louw 64' c Con: N. Olivier (8/10); R. Viljoen (2/2)	Scoreboard	Tries: J. Burke 79' c Con: Elgar Watts (1/1); Cards: Brinkhuys (yellow card) 42' to 52'

Park, Kimberley
Referee: Willie Roos

15:00 2009-07-25

Leopards	19 – 40	Golden Lions
Tries: J. Bowles 23' c Con: C. Durand (1/1); Pen: C. Durand (2/3) 41', 46'; DG: C. Durand (2/3) 4', 70'; Cards: J. Bowles (yellow card) 26' to 36'; J. Nel (red card) 59'	Scoreboard	Tries: W. Venter 5' m, 36' c H. van Dyk 60' m W. Alberts 72' c E. Rose 80' c Con: E. Rose (1/2); H. Kruger (2/3); Pen: E. Rose (1/2) 26'; H. Kruger (2/2) 55', 77'

Royal Bafokeng Sports Palace, Phokeng
Attendance: 1000
Referee: Craig Joubert

=== Round Three Summary ===
- The Sharks overcame three yellow-cards to claim a scrappy 19-13 win over the Blue Bulls in their Absa Currie Cup match at the Absa Stadium in Durban on Friday 24 July.
- Western Province consigned the Free State Cheetahs to a third consecutive Absa Currie Cup defeat with a 19-13 victory at Newlands on Friday 24 July.
- The log-leading Griquas made it three out of three in the Absa Currie Cup Premier Division with an 80-7 victory over the Boland Cavaliers in Kimberley on Saturday 25 July.
- The Xerox Lions dismantled the Leopards 40-19 in their Absa Currie Cup match at the Royal Bafokeng Sports Palace in Phokeng on Saturday 25 July.

=== Standings Afters Round Three ===
Team	Pld	W	D	L	PF	PA	PD	TF	TA	B	Pts
Griquas	3	3	0	0	144	36	+108	20	4	3	15
Golden Lions	3	2	0	1	84	60	+24	9	4	2	10
Sharks	3	2	0	1	80	52	+28	8	4	1	9
Blue Bulls	3	2	0	1	62	52	+10	6	3	1	9
Western Province	3	2	0	1	70	58	+12	4	4	0	8
Boland Cavaliers	3	1	0	2	43	144	−101	4	22	0	4
Free State Cheetahs	3	0	0	3	53	78	−25	4	8	1	1
Leopards	3	0	0	3	48	102	−54	5	11	0	0

== Round Four ==
17:00 2009-07-31

Golden Lions	19 – 23	Griquas
Tries: A. Hollenbach 22' c Con: H. Kruger (1/1); Pen: H. Kruger (4/5) 42', 47', 67', 75'; Cards: R. Cloete (yellow card) 54' to 64'	Scoreboard	Tries: N. Olivier 10' c B. Geel 27' c Con: N. Olivier (2/2); Pen: N. Olivier (2/3) 13', 35'; R. Viljoen (1/1) 71'

Coca-Cola Park, Johannesburg
Attendance: 4,195
Referee: Jonathan Kaplan

19:00 2009-07-31

Western Province	48 – 7	Leopards
Tries: L. Watson 22' m, 51' c, 74' c W. de Waal 36' c J. Pietersen 46' m P. Louw 62' c G. Aplon 79' c Con: W. de Waal (5/7); Pen: W. de Waal (1/1) 16'	Scoreboard	Tries: D. van Rensburg 67' c Con: C. Durand (1/1)

Newlands Stadium, Cape Town
Attendance: 9,135
Referee: Sandile Mayende

19:00 2009-07-31

Blue Bulls	50 – 18	Boland Cavaliers
Tries: G. van den Heever 15' c, 40' m J. Pretorius 22' c F. van der Merwe 41' c G. Steenkamp 47' c J. Burger 60' c M. Delport 80' c Con: F. Brummer (4/5); B. Francis (2/2); Pen: F. Brummer (1/1) 3'; Cards: M. Delport (yellow card) 29' to 39'	Scoreboard Report	Tries: L. Cornelius 77' m E. Kruger 79' c Con: E. Watts (1/2); Pen: E. Watts (2/2) 6', 45'; Cards: JP Adriaanse (yellow card) 14' to 24'

Loftus Versfeld, Pretoria
Attendance: 5,962
Referee: Joey Salmans

19:10 2009-07-31

Free State Cheetahs	12 – 21	Sharks
Pen: JL. Potgieter (3/3) 6', 32', 65'; DG: JL. Potgieter (1/2) 19'	Scoreboard	Pen: R. Kockott (5/6) 20', 37', 51', 53', 57'; M. Dumond (1/1) 75'; DG: R. Kockott (1/1) 25'

Vodacom Park, Bloemfontein
Attendance: 10,601
Referee: Willie Roos

=== Round Four Summary ===
- Griquas built up enough of a lead in the first half and then produced an inspired defensive effort in the second to beat the Xerox Lions 23-19 in their Absa Currie Cup Premier Division match in Johannesburg on Friday 31 July.
- Luke Watson scored a hat-trick of tries as Western Province made it three wins out of four in the Absa Currie Cup Premier Division with a 48-7 victory over the Leopards at Newlands in Cape Town on Friday 31 July.
- The Blue Bulls cantered to a 50-18 win over the Boland Cavaliers in their Absa Currie Cup game at Loftus Versfeld in Pretoria on Friday 31 July.
- A superb kicking performance from Rory Kockott saw Sharks hand the Free State Cheetahs a 21-12 defeat in their Absa Currie Cup match at Vodacom Park in Bloemfontein on Friday 31 July.

=== Standings Afters Round Four ===
Team	Pld	W	D	L	PF	PA	PD	TF	TA	B	Pts
Griquas	4	4	0	0	167	55	+112	22	5	3	19
Blue Bulls	4	3	0	1	112	72	+40	13	5	2	14
Western Province	4	3	0	1	118	58	+60	11	5	1	13
Sharks	4	3	0	1	101	64	+37	8	4	1	13
Golden Lions	4	2	0	2	103	83	+20	10	6	2	10
Boland Cavaliers	4	1	0	3	61	194	−133	6	29	0	4
Free State Cheetahs	4	0	0	4	65	99	−34	4	8	1	1
Leopards	4	0	0	4	55	150	−95	6	18	0	0

== Round Five ==
2009-08-07
15:00

Griquas	33 - 32	Western Province
Tries: R. du Preez 7' c S. Pretorius 19' c B. Basson 67' c Con: N. Olivier (3/3); Pen: N. Olivier (2/2) 34', 56'; DG: R. Viljoen (2/3) 24', 76'; Cards: R. du Preez (yellow card) 75' to 85'	Scoreboard	Tries: Penalty try 15' c F. Louw 36' c T. Chavhanga 74' m P. Louw 78' c Con: J. Pietersen (2/2); P. Grant (1/2); Pen: J. Pietersen (1/2) 10'; P. Grant (1/1) 76'

Park, Kimberley
Attendance: 5,000
Referee: Craig Joubert

2009-08-07
15:30

Boland Cavaliers	13 - 19	Golden Lions
Tries: Penalty try 49' c Con: J. Peach (1/1); Pen: J. Peach (2/3) 1', 12'	Scoreboard	Tries: H. Mentz 21' c Con: E. Rose (1/1); Pen: E. Rose (4/6) 42', 61, 69', 78'; Cards: R. Boshoff (yellow card) 45' to 55'

Boland Stadium, Wellington
Referee: Jaco Peyper

2009-08-07
19:00

Leopards	15 - 44	Sharks
Tries: J. Bowles 53' c, 80' m Con: C. Durand (1/2); Pen: C. Durand (1/4) 16'; Cards: J. van Zyl (yellow card) 35' to 45'; G. Williamson (yellow card) 59' to 69'	Scoreboard	Tries: C. McLeod 24' c, 65' c S. Terblanche 47' m J. Botes 60' c C. Burden 69' c C. Jordaan 75' m Con: J. M. Hernández (1/1); G. Cronje (3/5); Pen: J. M. Hernández (2/3) 11', 27'

Royal Bafokeng Sports Palace, Phokeng
Referee: Pro Legoete

2009-08-07
19:10

Free State Cheetahs	24 - 15	Blue Bulls
Tries: W. P. Nel 47' c F. Viljoen 58' c A. Strauss 68' c Con: JL. Potgieter (3/3); DG: JL. Potgieter (1/2) 26'; Cards: R. Ebersohn (yellow card) 38' to 48'	Scoreboard; Report	Pen: F. Brummer (5/5) 12', 28', 32', 38', 55'

Vodacom Park, Bloemfontein
Attendance: 13,877
Referee: Sandile Mayende

=== Round Five Summary ===
- Griquas made it five wins out of five in the Currie Cup Premier Division with a nail-biting 33-32 victory over Western Province in Kimberley on Friday 7 August.
- The Golden Lions edged out the Boland Cavaliers 19-13 in their Absa Currie Cup Premier Division match at Boland Stadium in Wellington on Friday 7 August.
- Defending Absa Currie Cupchampions Sharks moved into second place on the log with a 44-15 victory over the Leopards at the Royal Bafokeng Sports Palace in Phokeng on Friday 7 August.
- The Free State Cheetahs captured their first win of the season as they beat the Blue Bulls 24-15 in their Absa Currie Cup match at Vodacom Park in Bloemfontein on Friday 7 August.

=== Standings Afters Round Five ===
Team	Pld	W	D	L	PF	PA	PD	TF	TA	B	Pts
Griquas	5	5	0	0	200	87	+113	25	9	3	23
Sharks	5	4	0	1	145	79	+66	14	6	2	18
Western Province	5	3	0	2	150	98	+52	15	8	3	15
Golden Lions	5	3	0	2	122	96	+26	11	7	3	15
Blue Bulls	5	3	0	2	127	96	+31	13	8	2	14
Free State Cheetahs	5	1	0	4	89	114	−25	7	8	1	5
Boland Cavaliers	5	1	0	4	74	213	−139	7	30	1	5
Leopards	5	0	0	5	70	194	−124	8	24	0	0

== Round Six ==
2009-08-14
19:10

Leopards	17 - 71	Free State Cheetahs
Tries: R. Jeacocks 43' m, 70' c Con: C. Dumond (1/2); Pen: C. Dumond (1/1) 33'; Cards R. Kember (yellow card) 30' to 40'; S. Samaai (yellow card) 72' to 82'	Scoreboard	Tries: J. Nokwe 6' m, 79' c JP. Joubert 15' m N. Breedt 20' c, 57' c JW. Jonker 26' c, 41' m PW. Wessels 29' c D. Demas 31' c, 76' c R. Ebersohn 60' c Con: JL. Potgieter (5/7); L. Strydom (3/3); Cards: F. Viljoen (yellow card) 57' to 67'

Olën Park, Potchefstroom
Attendance: 10,000
Referee: Phillip Anthony Bosch

2009-08-15
15:00

Griquas	24 - 25	Blue Bulls
Tries: E. Seconds 33' m R. Barnes 41' m L. Nontshinga 61' m Pen: N. Olivier (3/3) 7', 19', 26'; Cards: R. Kitshoff (yellow card) 76' to 86'; J. Mokuena (yellow card) 77' to 88'	Scoreboard Report	Tries: D. Kuun 16' m F. Hougaard 36' m G. van den Heever 66' m P. Wannenburg 78' c Con: B. Francis (1/2); Pen: F. Brummer (1/2) 23'

Park, Kimberley
Attendance: 12,500
Referee: Willie Roos

2009-08-15
15:00

Boland Cavaliers	7 - 38	Western Province
Tries: Penalty try 18' c Con: J. Peach (1/1)	Scoreboard	Tries: G. Aplon 23' m JL. de Jongh 56' c T. Chavhanga 64' m B. Harris 77' m JJ Engelbrecht 81' c Con: J. Pietersen (1/3); P. Grant (1/2); Pen: J. Pietersen (3/5) 32', 42', 50'; Cards: C. Jack (yellow card) 18' to 28'

Boland Stadium, Wellington
Attendance: 5,800

2009-08-15
17:05

Golden Lions	19 - 30	Sharks
Tries: G. Grobbelaar 70' m D. Minnie 74' c P. Engelbrecht 80' c Con: E. Rose (0/1); R. Boshoff (2/2)	Scoreboard	Tries: R. Kankowski 20' c C. Burden 37' c Penalty try 78' c Con: M. Dumond (2/2); S. Terblance (1/1); Pen: M. Dumond (3/3) 18', 47', 64'

Coca-Cola Park, Johannesburg
Attendance: 21,975
Referee: Jonathan Kaplan

=== Round Six Summary ===
- The Free State Cheetahs ran in 11 tries as they smashed the Leopards 71-17 in their Absa Currie Cup match at Olen Park in Potchefstroom on Friday 14 August.
- The Blue Bulls scored a try in the dying minutes of the match to beat the Griquas 25-24 in their Absa Currie Cup clash at Park in Kimberley on Saturday 15 August.
- Western Province eased to a 38-7 win over the Boland Cavaliers in their Absa Currie Cup match at Boland Stadium in Wellington on Saturday 15 August.
- There may be a new order running the show at Coca-Cola Park, but the same old basic errors were on display out on the field as the Golden Lions were beaten 30-19 by Sharks in their Absa Currie Cup match in Johannesburg on Saturday 15 August.

=== Standings Afters Round Six ===
Team	Pld	W	D	L	PF	PA	PD	TF	TA	B	Pts
Griquas	6	5	0	1	224	112	+112	28	13	4	24
Sharks	6	5	0	1	175	98	+77	17	9	2	22
Western Province	6	4	0	2	188	105	+83	20	9	4	20
Blue Bulls	6	4	0	2	152	120	+32	17	11	3	19
Golden Lions	6	3	0	3	141	126	+15	14	10	3	15
Free State Cheetahs	6	2	0	4	160	131	+29	18	10	2	10
Boland Cavaliers	6	1	0	5	81	251	−170	8	35	1	5
Leopards	6	0	0	6	87	265	−178	10	35	0	0

== Round Seven ==
19:10 2009-08-21

Blue Bulls	44 - 11	Leopards
Tries: J. Pretorius 12' c D. Stegmann 17' c F. van der Merwe 43' c F. Hougaard 49' c G. van der Heever 56' m D. Potgieter 79' m Con: B. Francis (4/6); Pen: B. Francis (1/1) 7'; DG: B. Francis (1/1) 37'; Cards: D. Greyling (yellow card) 68' to 78'	Scoreboard Report	Tries: H. Dames 28' m Con: C. Durand (0/1); Pen: C. Dumond (1/1) 2'; C. Durand (1/1) 35'; Cards: B. Van der Walt (yellow card) 44' to 54'; T. Mamojele (yellow card) 68' to 78'; B. Van der Walt (yellow card) 76' to 86'; B. de Doncker (yellow card) 78' to 88'; B. Kember (red card) 81'

Loftus Versfeld, Pretoria
Attendance: 6,875
Referee: Stuart Berry

15:00 2009-08-22

Free State Cheetahs	59 - 8	Boland Cavaliers
Tries: H. Daniller 2' c, 73' c J. Nokwe 4' m, 13' c, 60' m, 80' c F. Viljoen 38' c JL. Potgieter 68' c PJ. Wessels 77' c Con: JL. Potgieter (4/6); L. Strydom (3/3)	Scoreboard	Tries: C. Hendricks 23' m Con: J. Peach (0/1); Pen: J. Peach (1/3) 43'; Cards: C. Lewis (yellow card) 36' to 46'; F. Spies (yellow card) 75' to 85'

Vodacom Park, Bloemfontein
Attendance: 12,250
Referee: Pro Legoete

15:00 2009-08-22

Sharks	41 - 6	Griquas
Tries: W. Murray 25' c C. McLeod 36' c M. Dumond 47' c L. Mvovo 63' c K. Daniel 71' c Con: M. Dumond (5/5); Pen: M. Dumond (2/2) 7', 16'; Cards: W. Herbst (yellow card) 43' to 44'	Scoreboard	Pen: N. Olivier (2/2) 29', 35'; Cards: R. Barnes (yellow card) 31' to 41'

ABSA Stadium, Durban
Attendance: 24,500
Referee: Phillip Anthony Bosch

17:05 2009-08-22

Western Province	25 - 20	Golden Lions
Tries: L. Watson 11' c J. Pietersen 39' m D. Vermeulen 64' c Con: J. Pietersen (2/3); Pen: J. Pietersen (2/3) 26', 33'; Cards: A. van Zyl (yellow card) 38' to 48'	Scoreboard	Tries: J. Vermaak 23' m Con: H. Kruger (0/1); Pen: H. Kruger (5/5) 20', 48', 51', 57', 78'

Newlands Stadium, Cape Town
Attendance: 21,253
Referee: Mark Lawrence

=== Standings Afters Round Seven ===
Team	Pld	W	D	L	PF	PA	PD	TF	TA	B	Pts
Sharks	7	6	0	1	216	104	+112	22	9	3	27
Western Province	7	5	0	2	213	125	+88	23	10	4	24
Griquas	7	5	0	2	230	151	+79	25	17	4	24
Blue Bulls	7	5	0	2	196	131	+65	23	12	4	24
Golden Lions	7	3	0	4	161	151	+10	13	11	4	16
Free State Cheetahs	7	3	0	4	217	139	+78	27	11	3	15
Boland Cavaliers	7	1	0	6	89	310	−221	9	43	1	5
Leopards	7	0	0	7	98	309	−211	11	40	0	0

== Round Eight ==
19:10 2009-08-28

Leopards	50 - 16	Boland Cavaliers
	Scoreboard

Olën Park, Potchefstroom
Attendance: 3,000
Referee: Jaco Peyper

15:00 2009-08-29

Sharks	9 - 21	Western Province
	Scoreboard

ABSA Stadium, Durban
Attendance: 28,000
Referee: Jonathan Kaplan

15:00 2009-08-29

Griquas	13 - 58	Free State Cheetahs
	Scoreboard

Park, Kimberley
Referee: Peter Allen

17:05 2009-08-29

Golden Lions	20 - 13	Blue Bulls
	Scoreboard; Report

Coca-Cola Park, Johannesburg
Attendance: 17395
Referee: Craig Joubert

=== Standings Afters Round Eight ===
Team	Pld	W	D	L	PF	PA	PD	TF	TA	B	Pts
Western Province	8	6	0	2	234	134	+100	24	10	4	28
Sharks	8	6	0	2	225	125	+100	22	10	3	27
Blue Bulls	8	5	0	3	209	151	+58	24	14	5	25
Griquas	8	5	0	3	243	211	+32	30	25	4	24
Free State Cheetahs	8	4	0	4	277	152	+125	34	13	4	20
Golden Lions	8	4	0	4	181	164	+17	17	14	4	20
Leopards	8	1	0	7	148	325	−177	17	42	1	5
Boland Cavaliers	8	1	0	7	105	360	−255	10	50	1	5

== Round Nine ==
15:30 2009-09-04

Boland Cavaliers	3 - 48	Sharks
	Scoreboard

Boland Stadium, Wellington
Attendance: 1,760
Referee: Peter Allen

19:10 2009-09-04

Leopards	33 - 34	Griquas
	Scoreboard

Olën Park, Potchefstroom
Attendance: 4,000
Referee: Jonathan Kaplan

15:00 2009-09-05

Free State Cheetahs	20 - 16	Golden Lions
	Scoreboard

Vodacom Park, Bloemfontein
Attendance: 13,576
Referee: Mark Lawrence

17:05 2009-09-05

Western Province	25 - 19	Blue Bulls
	Scoreboard; Report

Newlands Stadium, Cape Town
Attendance: 43,042
Referee: Pro Legoete

=== Standings Afters Round Nine ===
Team	Pld	W	D	L	PF	PA	PD	TF	TA	B	Pts
Sharks	9	7	0	2	273	128	+145	30	10	4	32
Western Province	9	7	0	2	259	153	+106	25	11	4	32
Griquas	9	6	0	3	277	244	+33	34	27	5	29
Blue Bulls	9	5	0	4	228	176	+52	25	15	6	26
Free State Cheetahs	9	5	0	4	297	168	+129	36	14	4	24
Golden Lions	9	4	0	5	197	184	+13	18	16	5	21
Leopards	9	1	0	8	181	359	−178	19	46	2	6
Boland Cavaliers	9	1	0	8	108	408	−300	10	58	1	5

== Round Ten ==
15:00 2009-09-11

Boland Cavaliers	23 - 31	Griquas
	Scoreboard

Boland Stadium, Wellington
Attendance: 650
Referee: Stuart Berry

19:10 2009-09-11

Golden Lions	31 - 13	Leopards
	Scoreboard

Coca-Cola Park, Johannesburg
Attendance: 3,425
Referee: Jaco Peyper

15:00 2009-09-12

Free State Cheetahs	33 - 31	Western Province
	Scoreboard

Vodacom Park, Bloemfontein
Attendance: 15,135
Referee: Marius Jonker

17:05 2009-09-12

Blue Bulls	23 - 29	Sharks
	Scoreboard; Report

Loftus Versfeld, Pretoria
Attendance: 30,977
Referee: Jonathan Kaplan

=== Standings Afters Round Ten ===
Team	Pld	W	D	L	PF	PA	PD	TF	TA	B	Pts
Sharks	10	8	0	2	302	151	+151	32	11	4	36
Western Province	10	7	0	3	290	186	+104	30	15	6	34
Griquas	10	7	0	3	308	267	+41	39	29	6	34
Free State Cheetahs	10	6	0	4	330	199	+131	40	19	5	29
Blue Bulls	10	5	0	5	251	205	+46	26	17	7	27
Golden Lions	10	5	0	5	228	197	+31	23	17	5	25
Leopards	10	1	0	9	194	390	−196	20	51	2	6
Boland Cavaliers	10	1	0	9	131	439	−308	12	63	1	5

== Round Eleven ==
19:10 2009-09-18

Leopards	3 - 37	Western Province
	Scoreboard

Olën Park, Potchefstroom
Attendance: 15,000
Referee: Ian Smith

15:00 2009-09-19

Boland Cavaliers	16 - 72	Blue Bulls
	Scoreboard; Report

Boland Stadium, Wellington
Attendance: 5,800
Referee: Paul Marks

15:00 2009-09-19

Griquas	36 - 31	Golden Lions
	Scoreboard

Diamantveld HS, Kimberley
Attendance: 1,500
Referee: Marius Jonker

17:05 2009-09-19

Sharks	24 - 13	Free State Cheetahs
	Scoreboard

ABSA Stadium, Durban
Attendance: 15,000
Referee: Mark Lawrence

== Round Twelve ==
19:10 2009-09-25

Sharks	34 - 20	Leopards
	Scoreboard

ABSA Stadium, Durban
Attendance: 9,193
Referee: Jonathan Kaplan

15:00 2009-09-26

Western Province	43 - 3	Griquas
	Scoreboard

Newlands Stadium, Cape Town
Attendance: 25,762
Referee: Paul Marks

15:00 2009-09-26

Golden Lions	88 - 15	Boland Cavaliers
	Scoreboard

Coca-Cola Park, Johannesburg
Attendance: 3,247
Referee: Mark Lawrence

17:05 2009-09-26

Blue Bulls	30 - 27	Free State Cheetahs
	Scoreboard; Report

Loftus Versfeld, Pretoria
Attendance: 24,006
Referee: Ian Smith

== Round Thirteen ==
19:10 2009-10-02

Free State Cheetahs	60 - 17	Leopards
	Scoreboard

Vodacom Park, Bloemfontein
Attendance: 12,350
Referee: Mark Lawrence

15:00 2009-10-03

Blue Bulls	61 - 27	Griquas
	Scoreboard; Report

Loftus Versfeld, Pretoria
Attendance: 12,637
Referee: Craig Joubert

15:00 2009-10-03

Western Province	50 - 7	Boland Cavaliers
	Scoreboard

Newlands Stadium, Cape Town
Attendance: 15,477
Referee: Sandile Mayende

17:05 2009-10-03

Sharks	19 - 17	Golden Lions
	Scoreboard

ABSA Stadium, Durban
Attendance: 15,000
Referee: Jonathan Kaplan

== Round Fourteen ==
19:10 2009-10-09

Leopards	24 - 61	Blue Bulls
	Scoreboard; Report

Royal Bafokeng Sports Palace, Phokeng
Attendance: 3,800
Referee: Craig Joubert

15:00 2009-10-10

Griquas	30 - 45	Sharks
	Scoreboard

Park, Kimberley
Referee: Mark Lawrence

15:00 2009-10-10

Boland Cavaliers	10 - 55	Free State Cheetahs
	Scoreboard

Boland Stadium, Wellington
Referee: Johannes Salmans

17:05 2009-10-10

Golden Lions	27 - 25	Western Province
	Scoreboard

Coca-Cola Park, Johannesburg
Attendance: 25,319
Referee: Marius Jonker

== Knock Out Stage ==
Semi-finals
2009-10-17 17:00 - Newlands Stadium, Cape Town
Western Province	19
Blue Bulls	21
2009-10-17 15:00 - ABSA Stadium, Durban
Sharks	21
Free State Cheetahs	23

Final
2009-10-31 - Loftus Versfeld Stadium, Pretoria
Blue Bulls	36
Free State Cheetahs	24

== Semi finals ==
14:30 2009-10-17

Sharks	21 - 23	Free State Cheetahs
Tries: S. Terblanche 9' m R. Pienaar 40' c Con: R. Pienaar (1/2); Pen: R. Pienaar (2/2) 36', 62'; DG: J. M. Hernández (1/2) 42'	Scoreboard	Tries: W. P. Nel 52' c JL. Potgieter 58'; Con: JL. Potgieter (2/2); Pen: JL. Potgieter (2/4) 5', 44'; DG: JL. Potgieter (1/1) 79'

ABSA Stadium, Durban
Attendance: 31,400
Referee: Marius Jonker

FB	15	Stefan Terblanche
RW	14	Odwa Ndungane	(substituted off) 25'
OC	13	Adrian Jacobs
IC	12	Riaan Swanepoel
LW	11	JP Pietersen
FH	10	Juan Martín Hernández
SH	9	Ruan Pienaar
LP	1	Tendai Mtawarira
HK	2	Bismarck du Plessis
TP	3	John Smit
LL	4	Steven Sykes
RL	5	Johann Muller	(substituted off) 52'
OF	6	Jacques Botes
BF	7	Jean Deysel	(substituted off) 60'
N8	8	Ryan Kankowski

		Substitutes:
HK	16	Craig Burden
PR	17	Jannie du Plessis
LK	18	Albert van den Berg	(substituted on) 52'
N8	19	Keegan Daniel	(substituted on) 60'
FL	20	Rory Kockott
CE	21	Monty Dumond	(substituted on) 25'
FH	22	Andries Strauss
Coach:
(South Africa) John Plumtree

FB	15	Hennie Daniller
RW	14	Lionel Mapoe
OC	13	Corne Uys
IC	12	Meyer Bosman
LW	11	Danwel Demas	(substituted off) 72'
FH	10	Jacques-Louis Potgieter
SH	9	JP Joubert	(substituted off) 68'
LP	1	Wian du Preez	(substituted off) 50'
HK	2	Richardt Strauss	27' to 29'	(substituted off) 40'
TP	3	W. P. Nel
LL	4	Nico Breedt
RL	5	David de Villiers
BF	6	Heinrich Brüssow
OF	7	Frans Viljoen	(substituted off) 68'
N8	8	Ashley Johnson

		Substitutes:
HK	16	Coenie Oosthuizen	(substituted on) 50'
PR	17	Izak van der Westhuizen
LK	18	Hendro Scholtz	(substituted on) 68'
FL	19	Kabamba Floors	(substituted on) 27'	(substituted off) 29'	(substituted on) 40'
SH	20	Tewis de Bruyn	(substituted on) 68'
FH	21	Louis Strydom
WG	22	Fabian Juries	(substituted on) 72'
Coach:
(South Africa) Naka Drotské

17:00 2009-10-17

Western Province	19 - 21	Blue Bulls
Tries: G. Aplon 61' c Con: J. Pietersen (1/1); Pen: J. Pietersen (4/4) 29', 39', 50', 68'	Scoreboard	Pen: M. Steyn (7/7) 5', 8', 14', 18', 55', 63', 77'; Cards: B. Botha (yellow card) 1' to 11'

Newlands Stadium, Cape Town
Attendance: 47,982
Referee: Mark Lawrence

FB	15	Joe Pietersen
RW	14	Gio Aplon	(substituted off) 73'
OC	13	Juan de Jongh
IC	12	Paul Bosch	(substituted off) 71'
LW	11	Frikkie Welsh
FH	10	Peter Grant
SH	9	Dewaldt Duvenhage
LP	1	Wicus Blaauw
HK	2	Tiaan Liebenberg
TP	3	Brok Harris
LL	4	Anton van Zyl	(substituted off) 46'
RL	5	Andries Bekker
OF	6	Francois Louw
BF	7	Duane Vermeulen
N8	8	Luke Watson

		Substitutes:
HK	16	Deon Fourie
PR	17	JC Kritzinger
LK	18	De Kock Steenkamp
N8	19	Schalk Burger	(substituted on) 46'
FL	20	Ricky Januarie
CE	21	Matt To'omua	(substituted on) 73'
FH	22	Sireli Naqelevuki	(substituted on) 71'
Coach:
(South Africa) Allister Coetzee

FB	15	Zane Kirchner
RW	14	Francois Hougaard
OC	13	Jaco Pretorius
IC	12	Wynand Olivier
LW	11	Bryan Habana	(substituted off) 64'
FH	10	Morné Steyn
SH	9	Fourie du Preez
LP	1	Gurthro Steenkamp
HK	2	Derick Kuun	(substituted off) 71'
TP	3	Werner Kruger
LL	4	Bakkies Botha	(yellow card) 1' to 11'	(substituted off) 69'
RL	5	Victor Matfield
OF	6	Deon Stegmann	51' to 63'
BF	7	Dewald Potgieter	(substituted off) 74'
N8	8	Pierre Spies

		Substitutes:
HK	16	Bandise Maku	(substituted on) 71'
PR	17	Rossouw de Klerk
LK	18	Danie Rossouw	(substituted on) 69'
N8	19	Pedrie Wannenburg	(substituted on) 51'	(substituted off) 63'	(substituted on) 74'
FL	20	Tewis de Bruyn
CE	21	Louis Strydom
FH	22	Gerhard van den Heever	(substituted on) 64'
Coach:
(South Africa) Frans Ludeke

== Final ==
17:00 2009-10-31

Blue Bulls	36 - 24	Free State Cheetahs
	Scoreboard; Report

Loftus Versfeld Stadium, Pretoria
Attendance: 53,684
Referee: Jonathan Kaplan

Blue Bulls:

15 Zane Kirchner, 14 Francois Hougaard, 13 Jaco Pretorius, 12 Wynand Olivier, 11 Bryan Habana, 10 Morne Steyn, 9 Fourie du Preez, 8 Pierre Spies, 7 Dewald Potgieter, 6 Deon Stegmann, 5 Victor Matfield (c), 4 Bakkies Botha, 3 Werner Kruger, 2 Derick Kuun, 1 Gurthro Steenkamp.

Replacements: 16 Bandise Maku, 17 Rossouw de Klerk, 18 Danie Rossouw, 19 Pedrie Wannenburg, 20 Heini Adams, 21 Burton Francis, 22 Gerhard van den Heever

Free State Cheetahs:

15 Hennie Daniller, 14 Lionel Mapoe, 13 Corne Uys, 12 Meyer Bosman, 11 Danwel Demas, 10 Jacques-Louis Potgieter, 9 JP Joubert, 8 Ashley Johnson, 7 Frans Viljoen, 6 Heinrich Brussow, 5 David de Villiers, 4 Nico Breedt, 3 WP Nel, 2 Adriaan Strauss (c), 1 Wian du Preez

Replacements: 16 Richardt Strauss, 17 Coenie Oosthuizen, 18 Izak van der Westhuizen, 19 Kabamba Floors, 20 Tewis de Bruyn, 21 Louis Strydom, 22 Fabian Juries

2009 Absa Currie Cup
Premier Division Champions
Blue Bulls
23rd title

== Promotion/relegation Matches ==
=== Round 1 ===
15:30 2009-10-24

Boland Cavaliers	36 – 35	Pumas
	Scoreboard

Boland Stadium, Wellington
Referee: Jonathan Kaplan

17:30 2009-10-24

Leopards	47 – 42	SWD Eagles
	Scoreboard

Olën Park, Potchefstroom
Attendance: 4,000
Referee: Marius Jonker

=== Round 2 ===
16:00 2009-10-30

SWD Eagles	18 – 17	Leopards

Outeniqua Park, George

18:00 2009-10-30

Pumas	40 – 3	Boland Cavaliers

Puma Stadium, Witbank

The Pumas are promoted to the Premier Division while the Boland Cavaliers are relegated to the First Division. The Leopards retain their place in the Premier Division while the SWD Eagles remain in the First Division.

== Monthly awards ==
Month	Manager of the Month		Player of the Month	
Month	Manager	Province	Player	Province
July 2009	Dawie Theron	Griquas	Sarel Pretorius	Griquas
August 2009	John Plumtree	Sharks	W. P. Nel	Free State Cheetahs
September 2009	Allister Coetzee	Western Province	Lionel Mapoe	Free State Cheetahs
October 2009	Naka Drotské	Free State Cheetahs	Ashley Johnson	Free State Cheetahs
