= 2006 Currie Cup Premier Division =

Domestic rugby union competition

- Countries: South Africa
- Date: 23 June – 14 October 2006
- Champions: Joint champions: Blue Bulls (22nd title); Free State Cheetahs (3rd title)
- Runners-up: Blue Bulls

The 2006 ABSA Currie Cup season was contested from June through to October. The Currie Cup is an annual domestic competition for rugby union clubs in South Africa. The tournament was controversial before it even began, with the Southern Spears saga regarding entry into the Super 14 and Currie Cup continuing.

The final was drawn between the Free State Cheetahs and the Blue Bulls 28-all at Vodacom Park. It was the first drawn final since the 1989 season. The 2006 final was the third Free State/Blue Bulls final in succession.

== Competition ==
=== Changes from previous season ===
The structure of the competition changed for 2006. In 2005, all fourteen provincial teams played in the qualifying rounds of the Currie Cup, with the top eight teams going through to the Premier Division competition and the bottom six teams going through to the First Division tournament.

For 2006, it was decided to reduce the number of teams to just eight. The five provincial teams directly affiliated to the Super 14 franchises - the Blue Bulls, Free State Cheetahs, Golden Lions, Sharks and Western Province, called "entrenched" teams – got automatic qualification to the Currie Cup Premier Division for five seasons, from 2006 until 2010.

The two best non-entrenched teams in the 2006 Vodacom Cup competition would also participate in the Premier Division. The Falcons won the Vodacom Cup competition and the Pumas finished fifth to secure their places in the Premier Division.

In addition, the South Eastern Cape would be named as an entrenched team for 2006 only, as preparation for the Southern Spears' entry into the 2007 Super 14 season. However, the Southern Spears were later denied entry into the Super 14 competition and the South Eastern Cape's spot were given to Griquas instead.

=== Format ===
All eight teams played a double round robin, meaning every team played fourteen matches in total.

Teams received four points for a win and two points for a draw. Bonus points were awarded to teams that scored 4 or more tries in a game, as well as to teams that lost a match by 7 points or less. Teams were ranked by points, then points difference (points scored less points conceded).

The top four teams qualified to the semi-finals.

=== Teams ===
Location of teams in 2005 Currie Cup Premier Division

2005 Currie Cup Premier Division teams
Team	Sponsored Name	Stadium/s	Sponsored Name
Blue Bulls	Vodacom Blue Bulls	Loftus Versfeld, Pretoria	Loftus Versfeld
Falcons	Medicover Falcons	Bosman Stadium, Brakpan	Bosman Stadium
Free State Cheetahs	Vodacom Free State Cheetahs	Free State Stadium, Bloemfontein	Vodacom Park
Golden Lions	Golden Lions	Ellis Park Stadium, Johannesburg	Ellis Park Stadium
Griquas	Wildeklawer Griquas	Griqua Park, Kimberley	ABSA Park
Sharks	Sharks	Kings Park Stadium, Durban	ABSA Stadium
Pumas	@lantic Pumas	Puma Stadium, Witbank	@lantic Park
Western Province	Vodacom Western Province	Newlands Stadium, Cape Town	Newlands Stadium

== Fixtures and results ==
	Date		Date
Round 1	June 23–24	Round 9	August 25–26
Round 2	June 30 - July 1	Round 10	September 1–2
Round 3	July 7–8	Round 11	September 8
Round 4	July 14–15	Round 12	September 15–16
Round 5	July 21–22	Round 13	September 22–23
Round 6	July 28–29	Round 14	September 29–30
Round 7	August 4–12	Semi-Finals	October 7
Round 8	August 18–19	Final	14 October

=== Round 1 ===
2006-06-23
2006-06-23	Blue Bulls	18–16	Falcons	Loftus Versfeld, Pretoria; Attendance: Referee: Craig Joubert
2006-06-23	Tries: JP Nel, Stefan Basson; Con: Morné Steyn; Pens: Morné Steyn (2); Card: JP Nel (yellow card) 1' to 11'		Try: Riaan Viljoen; Con: Louis Strydom; Pens: Louis Strydom (3); Card: Dewald Senekal (yellow card) 26' to 36'	Loftus Versfeld, Pretoria; Attendance: Referee: Craig Joubert

- Friday 23 June Pumas 18-25 Western Province Witbank

2006-06-23
2006-06-23	Sharks	33–22	Golden Lions	ABSA Stadium, Durban; Attendance: Referee: Jonathan Kaplan
2006-06-23	Tries: Carl Bezuidenhout, Jacques Botes, Andries Strauss, Bismarck du Plessis; Cons: Butch James (2); Pens: Butch James (3); Card: Johann Muller (yellow card) 77' to 80'		Tries: Wylie Human (3), Jaco Pretorius; Con: Rory Kockott	ABSA Stadium, Durban; Attendance: Referee: Jonathan Kaplan

- Saturday 24 June Cheetahs 55-14 Griquas Bloemfontein

=== Round 2 ===
- Friday 30 June Falcons 9-66 Cheetahs Brakpan

2006-07-01
2006-07-01	Griquas	60–26	Pumas	ABSA Park, Kimberley; Attendance: Referee: Willie Roos
2006-07-01	Tries: Heinrich Stride (2), Zane Kirchner (2), Lafras Uys, Gareth Krause, Vuyani Dlomo; Cons: Conrad Barnard (5); Pens: Conrad Barnard (5)		Tries: Pieter Benadé (2), Hendrik Meyer, Jacques Muller; Cons: Jeandré Fourie (3)	ABSA Park, Kimberley; Attendance: Referee: Willie Roos

- Saturday 1 July Western Province 25-28 Sharks Cape Town
- Saturday 1 July Golden Lions 24-39 Blue Bulls Johannesburg

=== Round 3 ===
- Friday 7 July Sharks 34-16 Pumas Durban
- Saturday 8 July Cheetahs 59-5 Golden Lions Bloemfontein
- Saturday 8 July Falcons 23-8 Griquas Brakpan
- Saturday 8 July Blue Bulls 10-15 Western Province Pretoria

=== Round 4 ===
- Friday 14 July Lions 32-19 Falcons Johannesburg
- Saturday 15 July Griquas 23-22 Sharks Kimberley
- Saturday 15 July Pumas 17-48 Blue Bulls Witbank
- Saturday 15 July Western Province 20-13 Cheetahs Cape Town

=== Round 5 ===
- Friday 21 July Falcons 31-40 Western Province Brakpan
- Friday 21 July Blue Bulls 28-37 Sharks Pretoria
- Saturday 22 July Griquas 27-23 Golden Lions Kimberley
- Saturday 22 July Cheetahs 42-27 Pumas Bloemfontein

=== Round 6 ===
- Friday 28 July Pumas 8-36 Falcons Witbank
- Saturday 29 July Blue Bulls 39-20 Griquas Pretoria
- Saturday 29 July Western Province 30-28 Golden Lions Cape Town
- Saturday 29 July Sharks 19-31 Cheetahs Durban

=== Round 7 ===
- Friday 4 August Falcons 17-46 Sharks Brakpan
- Saturday 5 August Griquas 23-27 Western Province Kimberley
- Saturday 5 August Cheetahs 12-24 Blue Bulls Bloemfontein
- Saturday 5 August Golden Lions 74-15 Pumas Johannesburg
- Saturday 12 August Blue Bulls 17-19 Golden Lions Pretoria

=== Round 8 ===
- Friday 18 August Falcons 13-27 Blue Bulls Brakpan
- Saturday 19 August Griquas 20-31 Cheetahs Kimberley
- Saturday 19 August Golden Lions 22-21 Sharks Johannesburg
- Saturday 19 August Western Province 43-10 Pumas Cape Town

=== Round 9 ===
- Saturday 25 August Sharks 16-6 Western Province Durban
- Saturday 25 August Pumas 27-60 Griquas Witbank
- Sunday 26 August Cheetahs 78-8 Falcons Bloemfontein

=== Round 10 ===
- Friday 1 September Pumas 14-82 Sharks Witbank

2006-09-01
2006-09-01	Golden Lions	39–28	Free State Cheetahs	Ellis Park, Johannesburg; Attendance: Referee: Jonathan Kaplan
2006-09-01	Tries: Jaco Pretorius, Ricky Januarie, Wikus van Heerden, Wylie Human, Jaco van Schalkwyk; Cons: Earl Rose (4); Pens: Earl Rose, Mark Harris; Card: Ricky Januarie (yellow card) 54' to 64'		Tries: Philip Burger (2), Kabamba Floors, Ryno van der Merwe; Cons: Willem de Waal (4)	Ellis Park, Johannesburg; Attendance: Referee: Jonathan Kaplan

2006-09-01
2006-09-01	Western Province	23–12	Blue Bulls	Newlands Stadium, Cape Town; Attendance: ~36,000; Referee: Mark Lawrence
2006-09-01	Tries: Gio Aplon (2); Cons: Naas Olivier (2); Pens: Naas Olivier (3); Card: De Wet Barry (yellow card) 6' to 16'		Tries: Frikkie Welsh, Morné Steyn; Con: Morné Steyn; Card: Francois van Schouwenburg (yellow card) 9' to 19'	Newlands Stadium, Cape Town; Attendance: ~36,000; Referee: Mark Lawrence

- Saturday 2 September Griquas 36-27 Falcons Kimberley

=== Round 11 ===
- Friday 8 September Blue Bulls 66-3 Pumas Pretoria
- Friday 8 September Cheetahs 28-13 Western Province Bloemfontein
- Friday 8 September Sharks 60-8 Griquas Durban
- Friday 8 September Falcons 17-32 Golden Lions Brakpan

=== Round 12 ===
- Friday 15 September Western Province 68-12 Falcons Cape Town
- Saturday 16 September Pumas 12-68 Cheetahs Witbank
- Saturday 16 September Golden Lions 66-13 Griquas Ellis Park
- Saturday 16 September Sharks 32-50 Blue Bulls Durban

=== Round 13 ===
2006-09-23
2006-09-23	Griquas	22–60	Blue Bulls	ABSA Park, Kimberley; Attendance: Referee: Craig Joubert	Report
2006-09-23	Tries: Vuyani Dlomo (2), Frans Viljoen; Cons: Conrad Barnard (2); Pen: Conrad Barnard		Tries: Akona Ndungane (2), Stefan Basson (2), Derick Kuün, Morné Steyn, Heini Adams, Danie Rossouw, Dries Scholtz; Cons: Morné Steyn (7); Pen: Morné Steyn	ABSA Park, Kimberley; Attendance: Referee: Craig Joubert

2006-09-23
2006-09-23	Falcons	64–41	Pumas	Bosman Stadium, Brakpan; Attendance: Referee: Deon van Blommestein
2006-09-23	Tries: Nico Luus (2), Jovan Bowles (2), Piet Krause, Riaan Hefer, Michael Vermaak, Mpho Matsaung, Attie Pienaar; Cons: Louis Strydom (7), Riaan Viljoen; Pen: Louis Strydom		Tries: Darryl Coeries (2), Pieter Benadé (2), Jacques Lombaard; Cons: Jeandre Fourie (5); Pens: Jeandre Fourie (2)	Bosman Stadium, Brakpan; Attendance: Referee: Deon van Blommestein

2006-09-23
2006-09-23	Free State Cheetahs	37–35	Sharks	Vodacom Park, Bloemfontein; Attendance: Referee: Willie Roos
2006-09-23	Tries: Richardt Strauss, Jannie du Plessis, Ryno van der Merwe; Cons: Willem de Waal (2); Pens: Willem de Waal (5); Drop: Willem de Waal		Tries: Odwa Ndungane, Ryan Kankowski, Waylon Murray, Keegan Daniel; Cons: Ruan Pienaar (3); Pens: Ruan Pienaar (3)	Vodacom Park, Bloemfontein; Attendance: Referee: Willie Roos

2006-09-23
2006-09-23	Golden Lions	42–36	Western Province	Ellis Park, Johannesburg; Attendance: Referee: Marius Jonker
2006-09-23	Tries: Jaco Pretorius (3), Earl Rose; Cons: André Pretorius (2); Pens: André Pretorius (5)		Tries: Sireli Naqelevuki (3), Luke Watson, Corne Uys; Cons: Naas Olivier; Pens: Naas Olivier (3)	Ellis Park, Johannesburg; Attendance: Referee: Marius Jonker

=== Round 14 ===
- Friday 29 September Pumas 10-89 Golden Lions Witbank
- Saturday 30 September Western Province 55-17 Griquas Cape Town
- Saturday 30 September Sharks 48-10 Falcons Durban
- Saturday 30 September Blue Bulls 41-31 Cheetahs Pretoria

== Standings ==
2006 Premier Division
Team	P	W	D	L	PF	PA	PD	TF	TA	BP	Pts
Free State Cheetahs	14	10	0	4	579	286	293	76	33	10	50
Blue Bulls	14	10	0	4	479	284	195	63	32	10	50
Western Province	14	10	0	4	424	289	135	58	32	9	49
Sharks	14	9	0	5	513	309	204	68	35	12	48
Golden Lions	14	9	0	5	485	383	102	64	48	10	46
Griquas	14	5	0	9	370	509	-139	43	73	5	25
Falcons	14	3	0	11	303	546	-243	37	77	5	17
Pumas	14	0	0	14	244	791	-547	31	110	4	4

=== Points Breakdown ===
- Four points for a win
- Two points for a draw
- One bonus point for a loss by seven points or less
- One bonus point for scoring four or more tries in a match

=== Table Notes ===
P = Played, W = Won, D = Drew, L = Lost, PF = Points Scored (Points For), PA = Points Conceded (Points Against), PD = Points Difference (Points For minus Points Against), TF = Tries Scored, TA = Tries Conceded, BP = Bonus points, Pts = Total Points

== Semi-finals ==
2006-10-07
2006-10-07	Blue Bulls	45–30	Western Province	Loftus Versfeld, Pretoria; Attendance: 46,930; Referee: Marius Jonker
2006-10-07	Tries: Derick Kuün (2), Marius Delport, Hilton Lobberts, Hottie Louw; Cons: Derick Hougaard (4); Pens: Derick Hougaard (3); Drops: Morné Steyn		Tries: Gerrie Britz (2), Bolla Conradie; Cons: Naas Olivier (3); Pens: Naas Olivier (3)	Loftus Versfeld, Pretoria; Attendance: 46,930; Referee: Marius Jonker

2006-10-07
2006-10-07	Free State Cheetahs	30–14	Sharks	Vodacom Park, Bloemfontein; Attendance: Referee: JC Fortuin
2006-10-07	Tries: Gavin Passens (2), Ryno van der Merwe; Cons: Willem de Waal (3); Pens: Willem de Waal (2), Meyer Bosman		Tries: JP Pietersen, Bismarck du Plessis; Cons: Ruan Pienaar (2); Cards: Johan Ackermann (yellow card) 15' to 25'	Vodacom Park, Bloemfontein; Attendance: Referee: JC Fortuin

== Final ==
2006-10-14
2006-10-14	Free State Cheetahs	28–28 (a.e.t.)	Blue Bulls	Vodacom Park, Bloemfontein; Attendance: Referee: Jonathan Kaplan
2006-10-14	Tries: Philip Burger, Kabamba Floors; Pens: Willem de Waal (5), Meyer Bosman		Tries: JP Nel (2), Marius Delport; Cons: Morné Steyn (2); Pens: Derick Hougaard, Morné Steyn (2); Cards: Johan Roets (yellow card) 42' to 52'; Dries Scholtz (yellow card) 52' to 62'	Vodacom Park, Bloemfontein; Attendance: Referee: Jonathan Kaplan

At the end of regular time the scores were level at 25-25 and the match went into extra-time for the first time in the Currie Cup's 127-year history. After 20 minutes of extra-time, the game was still tied, each team having managed to score no more than a penalty goal. In the absence of a tie-breaker, the match was drawn — the first time since 1989 that a final had been drawn — and, with no clear winner, the cup was shared by the two teams.

== Statistics ==
=== Top point scorers ===
Name	Tries	Conversions	Penalties	Drop goals	Total
Willem de Waal	3	40	37	2	212
Conrad Barnard	1	31	27	2	154
Morné Steyn	6	30	14	2	138
Naas Olivier	1	36	20	0	137
Louis Strydom	0	18	21	3	108

=== Top try scorers ===
Name	Tries
Philip Burger	15
Jaco Pretorius	11
Ryno van der Merwe	9
Luke Watson	8
Marius Delport	7
