= 2007 Currie Cup Premier Division =

Domestic rugby union competition

- Champions: Free State Cheetahs (4th title)

The 2007 ABSA Currie Cup season was contested from June through to October. The Currie Cup is an annual domestic competition for provincial rugby union teams in South Africa. The competition was won by the Free State Cheetahs after they defeated the Golden Lions 20–18 in the final.

== Standings ==
2007 Premier Division
Team	P	W	D	L	PF	PA	PD	TF	TA	BP	Pts
Free State Cheetahs	14	13	0	1	566	251	315	70	26	8	60
Sharks	14	10	0	4	410	272	138	54	27	11	51
Golden Lions	14	9	0	5	403	229	174	48	26	6	42
Blue Bulls	14	8	0	6	424	282	142	54	33	7	39
Western Province	14	8	0	6	378	307	71	47	32	7	39
Griquas	14	5	0	9	374	432	-58	47	58	7	27
Boland	14	3	0	11	239	602	-363	32	83	6	18
Falcons	14	0	0	14	292	711	-419	35	102	5	5

Updated 28 October 2007:

=== Points Breakdown ===
- Four points for a win
- Two points for a draw
- One bonus point for a loss by seven points or less
- One bonus point for scoring four or more tries in a match

=== Table Notes ===
- P = points
- W = Won
- D = Drawn
- L = Lost
- PF = points for
- PA = Points Against
- PD = Points Difference (PF – PA)
- TF = Tries For
- TA = Tries Against
- BP = Bonus points
- Pts = Total Points

== Fixtures and results ==
=== Compulsory friendlies ===
- Friday 13 July 2007 Leopards 20–17 Blue Bulls

=== Round one ===
22 June 2007	Blue Bulls	43–26	Falcons	Loftus Versfeld, Pretoria
	Try: Derick Kuun (2); Marius Delport; Wikus van Heerden (2); JP Nel; Con: Morne Steyn (5); Pen: Morne Steyn	Report	Try: Dean Okkers (2); Mark Harris; Con: Jacques Schutte; Pen: Len Olivier (3)

22 June 2007	Free State Cheetahs	91–3	Boland Cavaliers	Bloemfontein
		Report

23 June 2007	Western Province	18–13	Golden Lions	Newlands
		Report

=== Round two ===
29 June 2007	Falcons	11–45	Free State Cheetahs	Brakpan
		Report

30 June 2007	Boland Cavaliers	15–10	Western Province	Wellington
		Report

30 June 2007	Golden Lions	14–7	Sharks	Johannesburg
		Report

30 June 2007	Griquas	26–18	Blue Bulls	Kimberley
	Try: Tertius Carse; Wayne van Heerden; Con: Conrad Barnard (2); Pen: Conrad Barnard (4)	Report	Try: Deon Stegmann; Marius Delport; Con: Morne Steyn; Pen: Morne Steyn (2)

=== Round three ===
- Friday 6 July The Sharks 32–16 Western Province
- Friday 6 July Falcons 33–39 Boland Cavaliers
- Saturday 7 July Free State Cheetahs 51–10 Griquas

7 July 2007	Blue Bulls	25–11	Golden Lions	Loftus Versfeld, Pretoria
	Try: John Mametsa (3); Con: Morne Steyn (2; Pen: Morne Steyn (2	Report	Try: Ryno Benjamin; Pen: Jano Vermaak (2)

=== Round four ===
- Saturday 14 July The Sharks 43–20 Griquas
- Friday 20 July Griquas 63–10 Falcons
- Saturday 21 July Golden Lions 11–27 Free State Cheetahs
- Saturday 21 July Boland Cavaliers 12–26 The Sharks

21 July 2007	Western Province	17–26	Blue Bulls	Newlands
	Try: Luke Watson; Peter Grant; Con: Peter Grant (2); Pen: Peter Grant	Report	Try: Derick Kuun; Trompie Nontshinga; Con: Morne Steyn (2); Pen: Morne Steyn (2); Drop: Morne Steyn (2)

=== Round five ===
- Friday 27 July Falcons 5–62 Golden Lions
- Saturday 28 July Free State Cheetahs 45–13 Western Province
- Saturday 28 July Griquas 43–32 Boland Cavaliers

28 July 2007	Sharks	29–10	Blue Bulls	Durban
	Try: Bismarck du Plessis (2); Steven Sykes; Patric Cilliers; Con: Rory Kockott (2); Bradley Barritt; Pen: Rory Kockott	Report	Try: JP Nel; Con: Morne Steyn; Pen: Morne Steyn

=== Round six ===
3 August 2007	Blue Bulls	36–12	Boland Cavaliers	Loftus Versfeld, Pretoria
	Try: John Mametsa (2); Marius Delport; Derick Kuun; JP Nel; Con: Derick Hougaard (4); Pen: Derick Hougaard	Report	Try: Justin Peach; Jongi Nokwe; Con: Isma-eel Dollie

4 August 2007	Golden Lions	45–24	Griquas	Ellis Park
		Report

4 August 2007	Western Province	47–18	Falcons	Newlands
		Report

4 August 2007	Sharks	22–42	Free State Cheetahs	Durban
		Report

=== Round seven ===
10 August 2007	Falcons	22–45	Sharks	Brakpan
		Report

11 August 2007	Griquas	25–30	Western Province	Kimberley
		Report

11 August 2007	Boland Cavaliers	22–45	Golden Lions	Boland
		Report

11 August 2007	Free State Cheetahs	44–18	Blue Bulls	Bloemfontein
	Try: Marius Joubert; Meyer Bosman; Willem De Waal; Eddie Fredericks (2); Gavin Passens; Con: Willem De Waal (4); Pen: Willem De Waal (2)	Report	Try: Wayne Julies; John Mametsa; Con: Derick Hougaard; Pen: Derick Hougaard; Drop: Derick Hougaard

=== Round eight ===
17 August 2007	Falcons	7–48	Bulls	Brakpan
	Try: Bertus Swanepoel; Con: Riaan Viljoen	Report	Try: Derick Kuun; John Mametsa (3); Pedrie Wannenburg; Marius Delport; Derick Hougaard; Johan Roets; Con: Derick Hougaard (4)

18 August 2007	Boland Cavaliers	20–22	Free State Cheetahs	Wellington
		Report

18 August 2007	Griquas	14–24	Sharks	Kimberley
		Report

18 August 2007	Golden Lions	19–16	Western Province	Ellis Park
		Report

=== Round nine ===
31 August 2007	Free State Cheetahs	80–33	Falcons	Bloemfontein
		Report

1 September 2007	Blue Bulls	46–3	Griquas	Loftus Versfeld
	Try: Jaco Engels; Deon Stegmann; Derick Hougaard; JP Nel; John Mametsa; Marius Delport; Con: Derick Hougaard (5); Pen: Derick Hougaard; Drop: Derick Hougaard	Report	Pen: Conrad Barnard

1 September 2007	Western Province	62–10	Boland Cavaliers	Newlands
		Report

1 September 2007	Sharks	21–3	Golden Lions	Durban
		Report

=== Round ten ===
- Friday 7 September Boland Cavaliers 24–20 Falcons
- Saturday 8 September Wilderklawer Griquas 17–21 Free State Cheetahs
- Saturday 8 September Western Province 22–19 The Sharks

8 September 2007	Golden Lions	27–22	Blue Bulls	Ellis Park
	Try: Wylie Human; Jannie Boshoff; Con: Louis Strydom; Pen: Louis Strydom (3); Drop: Louis Strydom (2)	Report	Try: Ruan Vermeulen; Con: Derick Hougaard; Pen: Derick Hougaard (5)

=== Round eleven ===
- Friday 14 September The Sharks 50–25 Boland Cavaliers
- Saturday 15 September Falcons 25–65 Griquas
- Saturday 15 September Free State Cheetahs 24–19 Golden Lions

15 September 2007	Blue Bulls	35–10	Western Province	Loftus Versfeld, Pretoria
	Try: Danwel Demas; Deon Stegmann; JP Nel; James van der Walt; Con: Derick Hougaard (3); Pen: Derick Hougaard (2); Drop: Derick Hougaard	Report	Try: Gio Aplon; Con: Peter Grant; Pen: Peter Grant

=== Round twelve ===
21 September 2007	Blue Bulls	18–26	Sharks	Loftus Versfeld, Pretoria
	Try: John Mametsa; Neil Powell; Con: Derick Hougaard; Pen: Derick Hougaard; Drop: Derick Hougaard	Report	Try: Waylon Murray; Odwa Ndungane; Con: Rory Kockott (2); Pen: Rory Kockott (4)

- Saturday 22 September Golden Lions 61–30 Falcons
- Saturday 22 September Boland Cavaliers 22–57 Griquas
- Saturday 22 September Western Province 34–20 Free State Cheetahs

=== Round thirteen ===
- Friday 28 September Falcons 23–46 Western Province
- Saturday 29 September Griquas 0–28 Golden Lions
- Saturday 29 September Boland Cavaliers 15–62 Blue Bulls
- Saturday 29 September Free State Cheetahs 25–23 The Sharks

=== Round fourteen ===
5 October 2007	Blue Bulls	17–29	Free State Cheetahs	Loftus Versfeld, Pretoria
	Try: Jaco Engels; Danwel Demas; Con: Morne Steyn (2); Pen: Derick Hougaard	Report	Try: Willem de Waal; Alwyn Hollenbach; David De Villiers; J W Jonker; Con: Willem de Waal (2); Tewis de Bruyn; Pen: Willem de Waal

- Saturday 6 October Golden Lions 75–0 Boland Cavaliers
- Saturday 6 October The Sharks 43–29 Falcons
- Saturday 6 October Western Province 37–7 Griquas

=== Semi-finals ===
- Saturday 13 October The Sharks 12–19 Golden Lions
- Saturday 13 October Free State Cheetahs 11–6 Blue Bulls

=== Final ===
2007-10-27
2007-10-27	Free State Cheetahs	20–18	Golden Lions	Vodacom Park, Bloemfontein; Attendance: 40.000; Referee: Mark Lawrence
2007-10-27	Tries: Heinrich Brüssow, Tewis de Bruyn; Con: Willem de Waal (2); Pen: Willem de Waal (2); Cards: Darron Nell (yellow card) 48' to 60', Eddie Fredericks (yellow card) 63' to 73'		Tries: Willie Wepener, Jano Vermaak; Con: Earl Rose; Pen: Earl Rose, Louis Strydom; Cards: Rayno Benjamin (yellow card) 74' to 80'	Vodacom Park, Bloemfontein; Attendance: 40.000; Referee: Mark Lawrence
