= 2009 British & Irish Lions tour to South Africa =

Rugby union tour

- The 2009 Lions tour logo
- Date: 30 May – 4 July
- Coach: (Scotland) Ian McGeechan
- Tour captain: (Ireland) Paul O'Connell
- Test series winners: South Africa (2–1)
- Top point scorer: (Wales) Stephen Jones (65)
- Top try scorer: (England) Ugo Monye (5)
- Top test point scorer: (Wales) Stephen Jones (39)
- Top test try scorer(s): (England) Tom Croft (2) (Wales) Shane Williams (2)
Summary
P	W	D	L
Total
10	7	1	2
Test match
3	1	0	2
Opponent
P	W	D	L
South Africa
3	1	0	2

Tour chronology
- ← New Zealand 2005 Australia 2013 →

The 2009 British & Irish Lions tour to South Africa was an international rugby union tour which took place in South Africa from May to July 2009.

The British & Irish Lions played a three-match Test series against South Africa, with matches in Durban, Pretoria and Johannesburg, as well as matches against six provincial teams, and a match against the Emerging Springboks, South Africa's second national team. The Lions won all six provincial matches and drew with the Emerging Springboks, 13–13.

South Africa won the Test series, defeating the Lions 26–21 in the first Test, and then 28–25 in the second Test. The third Test was won by the Lions 28–9. The highlight of the series was the second Test, which the Lions led until the 76th minute, when they fell 25–22 behind. Stephen Jones then scored a penalty to tie the score at 25–25 with only two minutes left, but two minutes into injury time, Morné Steyn scored a 52-metre penalty kick to win the match for South Africa, 28–25.

The tour followed the 2005 British & Irish Lions tour to New Zealand and preceded the 2013 British & Irish Lions tour to Australia.

== Background ==
The tour was confirmed by the South African Rugby Union on 21 September 2007. The Lions chief executive John Feehan stated in November 2007 that no home Test match would be played prior to departure, as had taken place in 2005, and that fewer players and personnel would go to South Africa than had gone to New Zealand in 2005.

The Lions' tour manager was Gerald Davies, the head coach was Ian McGeechan, and the captain of the squad was Munster captain and Ireland lock, Paul O'Connell.

The tour schedule was announced by the Lions and the South African Rugby Union (SARU) on 10 April 2008. The final fixture confirmed was the game in Port Elizabeth; on 22 January 2009, SARU announced that they had received permission from the South African government to hold the match on the Youth Day national holiday on 16 June. This match marked the debut of the Southern Kings, a franchise formed in the Southern and Eastern Cape region, following the failure of the Southern Spears.

Head coach Ian McGeechan had planned to take the Lions squad to the Spanish city of Granada, at the foot of the Sierra Nevada mountains for a high-altitude training camp, but on 27 April he announced that it had been cancelled because of problems over player availability. The Lions flew to South Africa on 24 May, arriving the following day.

The format was similar to that of the Lions' 2005 tour of New Zealand. As in 2005, six games were played before the first Test, and a mid-week game between the first and second Tests; unlike 2005, there was no mid-week game between the second and third Tests. Due to its unpopularity, "The Power of Four" anthem was not used on the 2009 tour.

== Schedule ==
Date	Home team	Score	Away team	Venue	Result
30 May	Royal XV	25–37	British & Irish Lions	Royal Bafokeng Stadium, Rustenburg	Win
3 June	Golden Lions	10–74	British & Irish Lions	Ellis Park Stadium, Johannesburg	Win
6 June	Free State Cheetahs	24–26	British & Irish Lions	Free State Stadium, Bloemfontein	Win
10 June	Sharks	3–39	British & Irish Lions	Kings Park Stadium, Durban	Win
13 June	Western Province	23–26	British & Irish Lions	Newlands Stadium, Cape Town	Win
16 June	Southern Kings	8–20	British & Irish Lions	Nelson Mandela Bay Stadium, Port Elizabeth	Win
20 June	South Africa	26–21	British & Irish Lions	Kings Park Stadium, Durban	Loss
23 June	Emerging Springboks	13–13	British & Irish Lions	Newlands Stadium, Cape Town	Draw
27 June	South Africa	28–25	British & Irish Lions	Loftus Versfeld Stadium, Pretoria	Loss
4 July	South Africa	9–28	British & Irish Lions	Ellis Park Stadium, Johannesburg	Win

== Test series ==
=== First Test ===
South Africa won the first Test in Durban 26–21. Leading 19–7 at half-time and 26–7 after 50 minutes, the Springboks had dominated the scrum until the Lions made several substitutions. The Lions mounted a strong comeback, scoring late tries through Tom Croft and Mike Phillips, but South Africa held on. Inside the last ten minutes of the game, the Lions had two tries disallowed by the TMO. It was later described as an "unbelievable" Test match.

=== Second Test ===
The second Test at Loftus Versfeld in Pretoria was won by South Africa 28–25 with the last kick of the game – a penalty by Morné Steyn from inside his own half. The Lions had led 19–8 after an hour, but tries from Bryan Habana and Jaque Fourie allowed South Africa to tie the score before Steyn's series-winning kick. It was described as "devastation" for the Lions, with the team ending the game "looking more like a scene from [American television series] ER as opposed to a rugby team".

==== Controversy ====
The week of the third Test was marked by controversy and intense media interest surrounding the suspended Springbok players Schalk Burger and Bakkies Botha after a very physical second Test.

Burger was yellow-carded in the first minute, after he appeared to gouge Luke Fitzgerald's eye. Burger was subsequently banned for eight weeks for "making contact with the face in the eye area." He was cleared of gouging, as his action was found to be "reckless" but not intentional.

Burger was widely criticised, with many commentators believing he should have been sent off for the incident. Brian O'Driscoll was among many who criticised South Africa coach Peter de Villiers after he said Burger's actions should not even have led to a yellow card.

Bakkies Botha was banned for two weeks for a dangerous charge on prop Adam Jones, which left Jones with a dislocated shoulder. SA Rugby expressed their confusion over the reasons for Botha's ban with the coach calling it a "textbook cleanout". An appeal was lodged but the initial ruling was upheld. Coaches and players expressed concern about the impact such an interpretation might have on a core component of the game, with Lions player Phil Vickery and forwards coach Warren Gatland lending their support to Botha's case. The injured Jones himself later came out in defence of Botha, saying:

"Botha shouldn't have been banned for it, nowhere near it. I don't have any complaints. He just cleared me out of the ruck and I got caught. Everyone counter-rucks nowadays and, if anything, I was in the wrong place. He just hit me and I was unlucky. So I was surprised to see he got banned. I know we didn't cite him so I don't know why the independent commissioner did. It was just a fair ruck from a hard player. When I have met him before he seems like a tidy enough bloke so I'm not seeing it as anything malicious."

The Springboks came out for the third Test wearing white armbands with the words "Justice 4 Bakkies" on, in protest over perceived inconsistencies in the citing process. This protest was investigated by the IRB for allegedly "bringing the game in disrepute", and the team and management were fined accordingly.

=== Third Test ===
The Lions won the third Test on 4 July at Ellis Park in Johannesburg, beating the Springboks 28–9, in what The Times called "one of the best and most heroic performances in the history of the Lions". Having already won the series, the Springbok squad saw 10 changes from the previous week, and the Lions also saw substantial changes. The Lions led from the start, and Shane Williams scored two tries. England lock Simon Shaw was sin-binned for striking Springboks scrum-half Fourie du Preez with his knee in this test and received a two-week ban as a result. This was the first Test victory for the Lions in eight years, their last being in Brisbane in 2001.

Jamie Roberts was voted the Lions' sponsors' 'Player of the Series' by British and Irish journalists.

== Results ==
All times are local (UTC+2)

30 May 2009
15:00

Royal XV	25–37	British & Irish Lions
Try: Koch 17' c Barnes 26' m Roux 65' c Con: Olivier; Viljoen; Pen: Olivier (2) 9', 23'	Report	Try: Bowe 38' c Byrne 67' c A.W. Jones 75' c O'Gara 79' c Con: O'Gara (4); Pen: O'Gara (3) 6', 42', 72'

Royal Bafokeng Stadium, Rustenburg
Attendance: 12,352
Referee: Marius Jonker (South Africa)

3 June 2009
19:10

Golden Lions	10–74	British & Irish Lions
Try: Frolick 36' c Con: Pretorius; Pen: Pretorius 14'	Report	Try: Roberts (2) 6' c, 40' c O'Driscoll 10' c Monye (2) 21' m, 68' c Croft 29' c Bowe (2) 47' c, 57' c Hook 74' c Ferris 80' c Con: S. Jones (6/7); Hook (3/3); Pen: S. Jones (2) 12', 17'

Coca Cola Park, Johannesburg
Attendance: 22,218
Referee: Craig Joubert (South Africa)

6 June 2009
15:00

Free State Cheetahs	24–26	British & Irish Lions
Try: Demas 25' c du Preez 33' c Uys 72' c Con: Potgieter (2); Strydom; Pen: Potgieter 41'	Report	Try: Ferris 10' c Earls 16' c Con: Hook (2/2); Pen: Hook (4) 5', 19', 37', 49'

Vodacom Park, Bloemfontein
Attendance: 23,710
Referee: Wayne Barnes (England)

10 June 2009
19:10

Sharks	3–39	British & Irish Lions
Pen: Kockott 29'	Report	Try: Mears 22' c Phillips 41' m Fitzgerald 59' c Byrne 67' c Heaslip 80' c Con: O'Gara (3/4); Hook (1/1); Pen: O'Gara (2) 48', 52'

ABSA Stadium, Durban
Attendance: 21,530
Referee: Jonathan Kaplan (South Africa)

13 June 2009
15:00

Western Province	23–26	British & Irish Lions
Try: Pietersen 63' m Pen: De Waal (4/5) 3', 40+2', 47', 60'; Drop: De Waal (1/1) 19'; Pietersen (1/2) 27'	Report	Try: Bowe 28' m Monye 35' c M. Williams 55' m Con: S. Jones (1/3); Pen: S. Jones (2/3) 6', 11'; Hook (1/2) 77'

Newlands Stadium, Cape Town
Attendance: 34,176
Referee: Mark Lawrence (South Africa)

16 June 2009
15:00

Southern Kings	8–20	British & Irish Lions
Try: Mbiyozo 71' m Pen: Van der Westhuyzen 1'	Report	Try: Monye 49' c Penalty try 68' c Con: O'Gara (2/2); Pen: O'Gara (2/3) 26', 43'

Nelson Mandela Bay Stadium, Port Elizabeth
Attendance: 35,883
Referee: Nigel Owens (Wales)

First Test

20 June 2009
15:00

South Africa	26–21	British & Irish Lions
Try: Smit 5' c Brüssow 46' c Con: Pienaar (2/2); Pen: Pienaar (3/4) 11', 32', 35'; F. Steyn (1/2) 20'	Report	Try: Croft (2) 22' c, 67' c Phillips 74' c Con: S. Jones (3/3)

ABSA Stadium, Durban
Attendance: 47,813
Referee: Bryce Lawrence (New Zealand)

Team details

South Africa
British & Irish Lions

FB	15	François Steyn
RW	14	JP Pietersen
OC	13	Adrian Jacobs		(substituted off) 74'
IC	12	Jean de Villiers	(substituted off) 57'
LW	11	Bryan Habana
FH	10	Ruan Pienaar	64' to 74'
SH	9	Fourie du Preez	(substituted off) 69'
LP	1	Tendai Mtawarira	(substituted off) 64'
HK	2	Bismarck du Plessis
TP	3	John Smit (c)	64' to 76'
LL	4	Bakkies Botha	(substituted off) 57'
RL	5	Victor Matfield
OF	6	Heinrich Brüssow	(substituted off) 51'
BF	7	Juan Smith
N8	8	Pierre Spies
Substitutes:
PR	16	Gurthro Steenkamp	(substituted on) 64'
PR	17	Deon Carstens	(substituted on) 64'	(substituted off) 76'
LK	18	Andries Bekker	(substituted on) 57'
N8	19	Danie Rossouw	(substituted on) 51'
SH	20	Ricky Januarie	(substituted on) 69'
CE	21	Jaque Fourie	(substituted on) 57'
FH	22	Morné Steyn	(substituted on) 64'
Coach:
(South Africa) Peter de Villiers

FB	15	(Wales) Lee Byrne	(substituted off) 37'
RW	14	(Ireland) Tommy Bowe
OC	13	(Ireland) Brian O'Driscoll
IC	12	(Wales) Jamie Roberts
LW	11	(England) Ugo Monye
FH	10	(Wales) Stephen Jones
SH	9	(Wales) Mike Phillips
LP	1	(Wales) Gethin Jenkins
HK	2	(England) Lee Mears	(substituted off) 49'
TP	3	(England) Phil Vickery	(substituted off) 44'
LL	4	(Wales) Alun Wyn Jones	(substituted off) 69'
RL	5	(Ireland) Paul O'Connell (c)
BF	6	(England) Tom Croft
OF	7	(Ireland) David Wallace	(substituted off) 66'
N8	8	(Ireland) Jamie Heaslip
Substitutes:
HK	16	(Wales) Matthew Rees	(substituted on) 49'
PR	17	(Wales) Adam Jones	(substituted on) 44'
LK	18	(Ireland) Donncha O'Callaghan	(substituted on) 69'
FL	19	(Wales) Martyn Williams	(substituted on) 66'
SH	20	(England) Harry Ellis
FH	21	(Ireland) Ronan O'Gara
FB	22	(Ireland) Rob Kearney	(substituted on) 37'
Coach:
(Scotland) Ian McGeechan

Team	Kick %	Line breaks	Defenders beaten	Passes in contact	Mauls won	Possession lost	Tackles made	Tackles missed	Scrums	Lineouts	Penalties conceded
South Africa	75%	0	2	2	28/32	10	101	8	7/7	9/10	9
British & Irish Lions	60%	4	8	15	78/82	11	42	4	11/15	9/12	12

23 June 2009
19:10

Emerging Springboks	13–13	British & Irish Lions
Try: Demas 80' c Con: De Waal (1/1); Pen: Rose (2/4) 37', 49'	Report	Try: Earls 15' c Con: O'Gara (1/1); Pen: O'Gara (1/2) 8'; Hook (1/1) 77'

Newlands Stadium, Cape Town
Attendance: 39,418
Referee: Alain Rolland (Ireland)

Second Test

27 June 2009
15:00

South Africa	28–25	British & Irish Lions
Try: Pietersen 12' m Habana 63' c Fourie 74' c Con: M. Steyn (2/2); Pen: F. Steyn (1/2) 40+1'; M. Steyn (2/2) 68', 80+1'	Report	Try: Kearney 7' c Con: S. Jones (1/1); Pen: S. Jones (5/5) 3', 15', 61', 70', 78'; Drop: S. Jones (1/1) 36'

Loftus Versfeld, Pretoria
Attendance: 52,511
Referee: Christophe Berdos (France)

Team details

South Africa
British & Irish Lions

FB	15	François Steyn
RW	14	JP Pietersen
OC	13	Adrian Jacobs
IC	12	Jean de Villiers		(substituted off) 56'
LW	11	Bryan Habana
FH	10	Ruan Pienaar		(substituted off) 61'
SH	9	Fourie du Preez
LP	1	Tendai Mtawarira
HK	2	Bismarck du Plessis
TP	3	John Smit (c)
LL	4	Bakkies Botha		(substituted off) 59'
RL	5	Victor Matfield
OF	6	Schalk Burger	(yellow card) 1' to 11'
BF	7	Juan Smith		(substituted off) 59'
N8	8	Pierre Spies
Substitutes:
HK	16	Chiliboy Ralepelle
PR	17	Deon Carstens
LK	18	Andries Bekker		(substituted on) 59'
N8	19	Danie Rossouw		(substituted on) 59'	(substituted off) 61'
FL	20	Heinrich Brüssow			(substituted on) 61'
CE	21	Jaque Fourie		(substituted on) 56'
FH	22	Morné Steyn		(substituted on) 61'
Coach:
(South Africa) Peter de Villiers

FB	15	(Ireland) Rob Kearney
RW	14	(Ireland) Tommy Bowe
OC	13	(Ireland) Brian O'Driscoll	(substituted off) 65'
IC	12	(Wales) Jamie Roberts	(substituted off) 67'
LW	11	(Ireland) Luke Fitzgerald
FH	10	(Wales) Stephen Jones
SH	9	(Wales) Mike Phillips
LP	1	(Wales) Gethin Jenkins	23' to 31'		(substituted off) 45'
HK	2	(Wales) Matthew Rees
TP	3	(Wales) Adam Jones	(substituted off) 45'
LL	4	(England) Simon Shaw
RL	5	(Ireland) Paul O'Connell (c)
BF	6	(England) Tom Croft
OF	7	(Ireland) David Wallace	(substituted off) 68'
N8	8	(Ireland) Jamie Heaslip
Substitutes:
HK	16	(Scotland) Ross Ford
PR	17	(England) Andrew Sheridan	(substituted on) 23'	(substituted off) 31'	(substituted on) 45'
LK	18	(Wales) Alun Wyn Jones	(substituted on) 45'
FL	19	(Wales) Martyn Williams	(substituted on) 68'
SH	20	(England) Harry Ellis
FH	21	(Ireland) Ronan O'Gara	(substituted on) 67'
WG	22	(Wales) Shane Williams	(substituted on) 65'
Coach:
(Scotland) Ian McGeechan

Team	Kick %	Line breaks	Defenders beaten	Passes in contact	Mauls won	Possession lost	Tackles made	Tackles missed	Scrums	Lineouts	Penalties conceded
South Africa	55.6%	4	14	3	56/63	16	97	8	5/7	8/9	11
British & Irish Lions	100%	3	8	5	83/87	11	84	14	6/6	12/15	12

Third Test

4 July 2009
15:00

South Africa	9–28	British & Irish Lions
Pen: M. Steyn (3/3) 12', 40+1', 68'	Report	Try: S. Williams (2) 25' m, 33' c Monye 54' c Con: S. Jones (2/3); Pen: S. Jones (3/4) 9', 72', 73'

Coca-Cola Park, Johannesburg
Attendance: 58,318
Referee: Stuart Dickinson (Australia)

Team details

South Africa
British & Irish Lions

FB	15	Zane Kirchner			(substituted off) 57'
RW	14	Odwa Ndungane
OC	13	Jaque Fourie	23' to 24'
IC	12	Wynand Olivier
LW	11	Jongi Nokwe	(substituted off) 64'
FH	10	Morné Steyn
SH	9	Fourie du Preez	(substituted off) 41'
LP	1	Tendai Mtawarira	(substituted off) 72'
HK	2	Chiliboy Ralepelle	(substituted off) 41'
TP	3	John Smit (c)
LL	4	Johann Muller
RL	5	Victor Matfield
OF	6	Heinrich Brüssow
BF	7	Juan Smith
N8	8	Ryan Kankowski
Substitutes:
HK	16	Bismarck du Plessis	(substituted on) 41'
PR	17	Gurthro Steenkamp	(substituted on) 72'
PR	18	Deon Carstens
LK	19	Steven Sykes
N8	20	Pierre Spies	(substituted on) 64'
FH	21	Ruan Pienaar	(substituted on) 41'
FB	22	François Steyn	(substituted on) 23'	(substituted off) 24'	(substituted on) 57'
Coach:
(South Africa) Peter de Villiers

FB	15	(Ireland) Rob Kearney
RW	14	(England) Ugo Monye
OC	13	(Ireland) Tommy Bowe
IC	12	(England) Riki Flutey		(substituted off) 55'
LW	11	(Wales) Shane Williams
FH	10	(Wales) Stephen Jones
SH	9	(Wales) Mike Phillips
LP	1	(England) Andrew Sheridan
HK	2	(Wales) Matthew Rees		(substituted off) 37'
TP	3	(England) Phil Vickery		(substituted off) 55'
LL	4	(England) Simon Shaw	(yellow card) 37' to 47'	(substituted off) 69'
RL	5	(Ireland) Paul O'Connell (c)
BF	6	(England) Joe Worsley		31' to 34'		(substituted off) 66'
OF	7	(Wales) Martyn Williams		(substituted off) 76'
N8	8	(Ireland) Jamie Heaslip
Substitutes:
HK	16	(Scotland) Ross Ford		(substituted on) 37'
PR	17	(Ireland) John Hayes		(substituted on) 55'
LK	18	(Wales) Alun Wyn Jones		(substituted on) 69'
FL	19	(Ireland) David Wallace		(substituted on) 76'
FL	20	(England) Tom Croft		(substituted on) 31'	(substituted off) 34'	(substituted on) 66'
SH	21	(England) Harry Ellis		(substituted on) 55'
FH	22	(Wales) James Hook
Coach:
(Scotland) Ian McGeechan

Team	Kick %	Line breaks	Defenders beaten	Passes in contact	Mauls won	Possession lost	Tackles made	Tackles missed	Scrums	Lineouts	Penalties conceded
South Africa	100%	3	5	12	64/69	16	93	5	5/6	15/18	9
British & Irish Lions	62.5%	7	5	15	66/77	10	102	5	6/7	9/10	16

== Attendances ==
Attendances
Matches	10
Total attendance	347,929
Average attendance	34,793
Highest attendance	align=: center; 58,318 South Africa vs British & Irish Lions; Coca-Cola Park 4 July 2009
Lowest attendance	align=: center; 12,352 (South Africa) Royal XV vs British & Irish Lions; Royal Bafokeng Stadium 30 May 2009

== Lions squad ==
The Lions announced a 37-man squad on 21 April 2009. Before the start of the tour Tomás O'Leary, Tom Shanklin and Jerry Flannery all withdrew because of injuries and Alan Quinlan was suspended. During the tour, Leigh Halfpenny, Stephen Ferris, Euan Murray, Lee Byrne, Adam Jones, Gethin Jenkins, Jamie Roberts and Brian O'Driscoll, as well as Ferris' replacement Ryan Jones, were forced to withdraw from the squad due to injury. Nathan Hines was suspended for one week because of a dangerous tackle against the Emerging Springboks.

Notes: Ages listed are as of the first tour match on 30 May. Bold denotes that the player was selected for a previous Lions squad.

Player	Position	Date of birth (age)	National team	Club/province	Notes
Jerry Flannery	Hooker	17 October 1978 (age 31)	Ireland	Munster	Originally selected; withdrew before tour due to injury; replaced by Ross Ford
Ross Ford	Hooker	23 April 1984 (age 24)	Scotland	Edinburgh	Replacement for Jerry Flannery before tour
Lee Mears	Hooker	5 March 1979 (age 29)	England	Bath	
Matthew Rees	Hooker	9 December 1980 (age 29)	Wales	Scarlets	
John Hayes	Prop	2 November 1973 (age 36)	Ireland	Munster	Replacement for Euan Murray during tour
Gethin Jenkins	Prop	17 November 1980 (age 29)	Wales	Cardiff Blues	
Adam Jones	Prop	8 March 1981 (age 27)	Wales	Ospreys	Withdrew due to injury during tour
Euan Murray	Prop	7 August 1980 (age 29)	Scotland	Northampton Saints	Withdrew due to injury during tour; replaced by John Hayes
Tim Payne	Prop	9 April 1979 (age 29)	England	London Wasps	Replacement due to injury to Andrew Sheridan during tour
Andrew Sheridan	Prop	1 November 1979 (age 30)	England	Sale Sharks	
Phil Vickery	Prop	14 March 1976 (age 32)	England	London Wasps	
Nathan Hines	Lock	29 March 1976 (age 32)	Scotland	Perpignan	Suspended for a week for a dangerous tackle against the Emerging Springboks
Alun Wyn Jones	Lock	19 September 1985 (age 24)	Wales	Ospreys	
Donncha O'Callaghan	Lock	24 March 1979 (age 29)	Ireland	Munster	
Paul O'Connell (c)	Lock	20 October 1979 (age 30)	Ireland	Munster	
Simon Shaw	Lock	1 September 1973 (age 36)	England	London Wasps	
Tom Croft	Flanker	7 November 1985 (age 24)	England	Leicester Tigers	Replacement for Alan Quinlan before tour
Stephen Ferris	Flanker	2 August 1985 (age 24)	Ireland	Ulster	Originally selected; withdrew due to injury during tour; replaced by Ryan Jones
Ryan Jones	Flanker	13 March 1981 (age 27)	Wales	Ospreys	Replacement for Stephen Ferris; withdrew on arrival in South Africa due to previous injury
Alan Quinlan	Flanker	13 July 1974 (age 35)	Ireland	Munster	Originally selected; suspended before tour; replaced by Tom Croft
David Wallace	Flanker	8 July 1976 (age 33)	Ireland	Munster	
Martyn Williams	Flanker	1 September 1975 (age 34)	Wales	Cardiff Blues	
Joe Worsley	Flanker	14 June 1977 (age 32)	England	London Wasps	
Jamie Heaslip	Number eight	15 December 1983 (age 26)	Ireland	Leinster	
Andy Powell	Number eight	23 August 1981 (age 28)	Wales	Cardiff Blues	
Mike Blair	Scrum-half	20 April 1981 (age 27)	Scotland	Edinburgh	Replacement for Tomás O'Leary before tour
Harry Ellis	Scrum-half	17 May 1982 (age 26)	England	Leicester Tigers	
Tomás O'Leary	Scrum-half	22 October 1983 (age 26)	Ireland	Munster	Originally selected; withdrew before tour due to injury; replaced by Mike Blair
Mike Phillips	Scrum-half	29 August 1982 (age 27)	Wales	Ospreys	
James Hook	Fly-half	27 June 1985 (age 24)	Wales	Ospreys	Replacement for Leigh Halfpenny before tour
Stephen Jones	Fly-half	8 December 1977 (age 32)	Wales	Scarlets	
Ronan O'Gara	Fly-half	7 March 1977 (age 31)	Ireland	Munster	
Gordon D'Arcy	Centre	10 February 1980 (age 28)	Ireland	Leinster	Replacement due to injuries among backs
Keith Earls	Centre	2 October 1987 (age 22)	Ireland	Munster	
Riki Flutey	Centre	10 February 1980 (age 28)	England	London Wasps	
Brian O'Driscoll	Centre	21 January 1979 (age 29)	Ireland	Leinster	Withdrew due to injury during tour
Jamie Roberts	Centre	8 November 1986 (age 23)	Wales	Cardiff Blues	Named the 2009 Lions Player of the Series
Tom Shanklin	Centre	24 November 1979 (age 30)	Wales	Cardiff Blues	Originally selected; withdrew before tour due to injury
Tommy Bowe	Wing	22 February 1984 (age 24)	Ireland	Ospreys	
Luke Fitzgerald	Wing	13 September 1987 (age 22)	Ireland	Leinster	
Leigh Halfpenny	Wing	22 December 1988 (age 21)	Wales	Cardiff Blues	Originally selected; joined tour late due to injury; replaced by James Hook; withdrew due to recurrent injury
Ugo Monye	Wing	13 April 1983 (age 25)	England	Harlequins	
Shane Williams	Wing	26 February 1977 (age 32)	Wales	Ospreys	
Lee Byrne	Fullback	1 June 1980 (age 29)	Wales	Ospreys	Withdrew during tour due to injury
Rob Kearney	Fullback	26 March 1986 (age 22)	Ireland	Leinster	

== Lions management ==
23 backroom staff were appointed by the Lions, slightly down from the 26 on the 2005 tour to New Zealand. The Lions reverted to having only one management structure, rather than a separate team for the midweek side. The tour manager was former Wales and Lions player Gerald Davies.

=== Coaches ===
Name	Role	Home union	Nationality
Ian McGeechan	Head coach	Scotland	Scotland
Warren Gatland	Forwards coach	Wales	New Zealand
Graham Rowntree	Scrummaging coach	England	England
Rob Howley	Attack coach	Wales	Wales
Shaun Edwards	Defence coach	Wales	England
Neil Jenkins	Kicking coach	Wales	Wales

== See also ==
- List of British & Irish Lions test matches
