= Sireli Naqelevuki =

Fiji international rugby union player (born 1980)

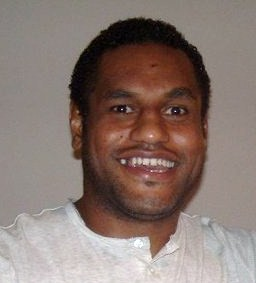
- Born: Sireli Masibalavu Naqelevuki; 30 September 1980 (age 46) Suva, Fiji
- Height: 1.93 m (6 ft 4 in)
- Weight: 113 kg (17 st 11 lb; 249 lb)
- School: Lelean Memorial School

Rugby union career
- Position(s): Wing, Centre
- Current team: Exeter Chiefs
Senior career
Years	Team	Apps	(Points)
2010–	Exeter Chiefs	18	(25)
Provincial / State sides
Years	Team	Apps	(Points)
2006–09	Western Province	29	(95)
Super Rugby
Years	Team	Apps	(Points)
2008–10	Stormers	25	(40)
International career
Years	Team	Apps	(Points)
2006–	Fiji	7	(10)
National sevens team
Years	Team		Comps
2002–07	Fiji		
Medal record
Men's rugby sevens
Representing Fiji
Commonwealth Games
Bronze medal – third place	2006 Melbourne	Team competition

Sireli Masibalavu Naqelevuki (born 30 September 1980, in Suva, Fiji) plays as a prop in rugby sevens but in traditional 15s he is a wing or centre. He made his rugby sevens debut in 2002 in Dubai Sevens. He is 1.93m tall (6'4") and weighs 118 kg. Contracted to the FRU, he played in seven of the eight IRB 7s tournaments when Fiji won the 2005–06 Series. His father, test rep Samu Naqelevuki, was a hard-hitting utility back who died in November 2002 only a few days after Sireli had been selected for the Fiji 7s team.

== Career ==
He played for the Suva Highlanders in the Colonial Cup but after his performance in the rugby sevens Circuit, he was recruited by the Western Province Rugby Union and he played for them in the Currie Cup where he has played 29 games for them scoring 19 tries. After solid performances for the provincial team he got picked for the Stormers Super 14 franchise team. In 2007 he tested positive for cannabis after representing Fiji in the second leg of the International Rugby Board (IRB) Sevens series in George late last year. His B Sample tested positive, leaving the Fiji 7s star to face an IRB Judicial Committee hearing. He was banned from playing rugby for 3 months. He returned after his three-month ban and got picked by the Fiji sevens team for the remainder of the 2006–07 IRB Sevens World Series.

While playing for the Stormers in the 2009 Super 14 season, Naqelevuki scored 4 tries, but was criticised by rugby columnist Tank Lanning for being generally unfit. Nevertheless, Naqelevuki was selected for the Western province 2009 Currie Cup team. He made a return to the Fiji sevens team when he was included in the George leg of the 2009–10 IRB Sevens World Series after injuries to 2 players and the Fiji coach, Iliesa Tanivula decided against getting replacement from Fiji as it would be expensive and with Naqelevuki's ability to play in the forwards as well as the backs, no other replacements were needed.

In the 2010 Super 14 season, Sireli shared the right wing position with Gio Aplon since his left wing berth now belonged to Springboks winger, Bryan Habana. His performance in the first few weeks was average but he picked his game in Week 4 and was named the man of the match against the Hurricanes in Week 5. Since then he has been consistent and has become a valuable member of the team and after an injury to fullback Joe Pietersen forced the coach, Allister Coetzee to play Aplon at fullback thus allowing Naqelevuki to start most games on the right wing pairing Jaque Fourie as his outside centre partner. His changed of attitude has gone down well with local fans who were angry after his dismissal performance for Western Province in the Currie Cup cost them a place in the semi-finals. After he was unceremoniously dumped after his game against the Sharks, he wasn't selected for the remaining matches including the semi-final and the grand final, he returned to Fiji to take part in the 2010 IRB Pacific Nations Cup. He has had offers from European clubs though he still has not signed a contract to date. He was released from his contract with the Stormers and Western Province after the 2010 Super 14 season.

In early September 2010, he flew out of Fiji to join his new club in the Guinness Premiership newcomers the Exeter Chiefs in England. The signing of Naqelevuki was confirmed by Exeter Chiefs on 20 September 2010.

In, 2 October, he made his Aviva Premiership debut against Northampton Saints

== See also ==
- List of sportspeople sanctioned for doping offences
