= Heinrich Brüssow =

South Africa international rugby union player

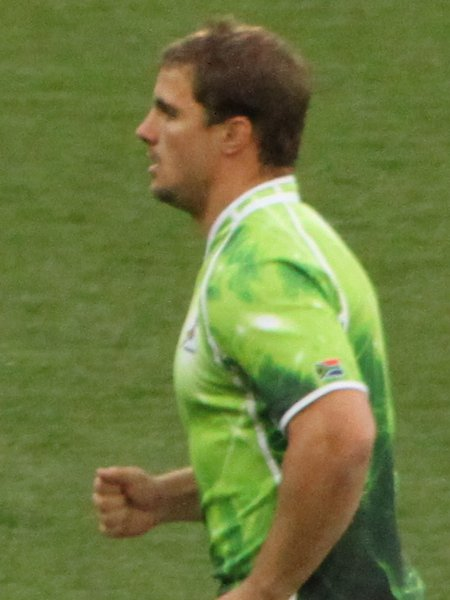
- Full name: Heinrich Wilhelm Brüssow
- Born: 21 July 1986 (age 40) Bloemfontein, South Africa
- Height: 1.80 m (5 ft 11 in)
- Weight: 101 kg (15 st 13 lb; 223 lb)
- School: Grey College, Bloemfontein
- University: University of the Free State

Rugby union career
- Position: Flanker
- Current team: Northampton Saints
Youth career
- 2004–2005: Free State Cheetahs
Senior career
Years	Team	Apps	(Points)
2006–2014	Free State Cheetahs	61	(125)
2007–2015	Cheetahs	82	(45)
2013–2018	NTT DoCoMo Red Hurricanes	27	(25)
2018–2020	Northampton Saints	20	(20)
- Correct as of 24 September 2023
International career
Years	Team	Apps	(Points)
2004	South Africa Schools		
2006	South Africa Sevens		
2008–11, 2015	South Africa	22	(5)
2014	Barbarians	2	(5)
- Correct as of 24 September 2023

Heinrich Wilhelm Brüssow (born 21 July 1986) is a South African former professional rugby union player. His usual position was as open-side flanker and his most recent club was Northampton Saints in the English Premiership.

He played for the Free State Cheetahs in domestic South African rugby between 2006 and 2014, for the Cheetahs in Super Rugby between 2007 and 2015 and also represented South Africa between 2008 and 2015 and for the South Africa Sevens team in 2006.

== Early career ==
Born 21 July 1986 in Bloemfontein, South Africa, Heinrich Brüssow attended Grey College in Bloemfontein where he played in the First XV and was later selected for the Under-18 Free State Craven Week side. Brüssow was part of the Free State Cheetahs squad who shared the Currie Cup glory in 2006 with the Blue Bulls, before playing in the 2007 Currie Cup final against the Golden Lions, scoring a crucial try and helping the team to a 20–18 win. In 2008 he was voted best open-side flanker in the Super 14 and Currie Cup. This earned him a call-up to the Springboks squad for the November 2008 tour to the British Isles. He only played the final 4 minutes in the end-of-tour test against England.

== Professional career ==
In 2009, Brüssow was again a flanker in the Super 14 competition. However, selectors excluded him from the Springboks squad. Soon afterwards he played for the Free State Cheetahs against the British & Irish Lions team; Brüssow was finally called up for Schalk Burger, who failed to recover from an injury for the first test against the Lions. He received the Man-of-the-Match award in the Springboks' win against the All Blacks on 25 July 2009. Brüssow once again featured in a Currie Cup final in 2009, but the Free State Cheetahs lost to a hungry Blue Bulls team.

Early March 2010 Brüssow's career took a blow when he injured his cruciate knee-ligament in a Super 14 game against the Hurricanes, which kept him from international rugby till August 2011. For the Cheetahs in the 2011 super rugby season Brussow was part of the Cheetahs team that finished 11th in the table. The cheetahs won five and lost eleven games that season which showed that they were not at their best. However they produced some wonderful wins against the Waratahs and the Brumbies. In the 2011 tri-nations Brüssow only came in at the third game against eventual champions Australia. South Africa lost the match 14–9. South Africa had nothing much to play for in final test against New Zealand but they could certainly spoil the party for the All Blacks. Brüssow put up a Man-of-the-Match winning performance and South Africa beat the All Blacks by 18–5.

He returned to international competition on 13 August 2011 against Australia: He played for a short stint from the bench where he showed he still had the full ability which made him so popular in 2009. On 20 August Heinrich Brüssow gave a Man-of-the-Match display of his skills as the Springboks managed to defeat their arch-enemies, the All Blacks in Port Elizabeth.

Brüssow played the first game against Wales which South Africa won 17–16 and against Fiji which the boks also won 49–3. However against Namibia, Alberts was favoured to Brüssow in the starting line up which meant Brüssow had to drop to the bench. South Africa won the game and Brüssow restored his place in the starting line up against Samoa which South Africa won to reach the quarter-finals of the World Cup. In the quarter-finals Brussow started against Australia. South Africa lost the game 11–9 and were knocked out of the competition. In the summer internationals, Brüssow was shockingly dropped from the team with new South Africa coach Heyneke Meyer preferring Marcell Coetzee. Even without Brüssow's commitment, South Africa won the series against England with a win in the first test 22–17, second test 36–27 but were held to a draw in the third test 14–14.

In 2013, it was announced that he would play for a team in the Japanese Top League for the 2013–2014 season – later revealed as NTT DoCoMo Red Hurricanes – but he would return to play for the Cheetahs in the 2014 Super Rugby season.

In January 2018, he joined English Premiership side Northampton Saints.

He announced his retirement from all forms of professional rugby on Wednesday 23 October 2019.

== Squads ==
- 2013
  - Cheetahs (Vodacom Super Rugby)
- 2012
  - Toyota Free State Cheetahs (ABSA Currie Cup Premier Division)
  - Cheetahs (Vodacom Super Rugby)
- 2011
  - Springboks squad (2011 Rugby World Cup)
  - Springboks squad (Tri Nations (rugby union))
  - Toyota Free State Cheetahs (ABSA Currie Cup Premier Division)
  - Cheetahs (Vodacom Super 14) – Re-injured March 2011
- 2010
  - Cheetahs (Vodacom Super 14) – Injured March 2010
- 2009
  - Springboks spring tour squad (France, Italy & Ireland)
  - Springboks squad (British & Irish Lions Tour)
  - Springboks squad (Tri Nations (rugby union))
  - Vodacom Free State Cheetahs (British & Irish Lions Tour)
  - Cheetahs (Vodacom Super 14)
- 2008
  - Springboks spring tour squad (British Isles)
  - Vodacom Free State Cheetahs (ABSA Currie Cup Premier Division)
  - Cheetahs (Vodacom Super 14)
- 2007
  - Vodacom Free State Cheetahs (Vodacom Cup)
  - Vodacom Free State Cheetahs (ABSA Currie Cup Premier Division)
  - Cheetahs (Vodacom Super 14)
- 2006
  - Vodacom Free State Cheetahs (ABSA Currie Cup Premier Division)
  - Vodacom Free State Cheetahs (Vodacom Cup)
- 2005
  - Free State (SA Under 19)
- 2004
  - Free State (U18 Coca-Cola Craven Week)

== Influential Games ==
=== 2009 ===
- 20 June 2009 : South Africa vs British and Irish Lions I: Heinrich Brüssow replaces injured Schalk Burger in the starting line-up. His ball-stealing and recovering skills proved too much for the Lions. When he was replaced in the second half, the Lions managed to fight back, but not enough to win the game. Scored a try from the back of a maul and was outstanding as they went on to secure a 2–1 series victory.
- 27 June 2009 : South Africa vs Lions II: Brüssow came on in the 62nd minute and effected a few crucial turn-overs helping seal the 28–25 victory for the South Africans.
- 25 July 2009 : South Africa vs All Blacks I: Although being targeted, Brüssow battled competently against Richie McCaw, who is widely considered the best open-side flanker in the world. He made a number of crucial turn-overs and tackles. He was named Man-of-the-Match in the 28–19 victory.
- 1 August 2009 : South Africa vs All Blacks II: Continuing to build on his reputation, Brüssow again managed to compete with the All Black captain Richie McCaw at the breakdown. He once again made a number of crucial turnovers, tackles and powerful runs as the Boks won 31–19.
- 8 August 2009 : South Africa vs Wallabies I: Brüssow was once again in outstanding form for the Springboks as his ruck work, brutal hits and ball-carrying led South Africa to victory over Australia. His opposite number George Smith, also considered one of the best in world rugby, could not cut it with Brüssow, and his frustration led to a yellow card.
- 13 November 2009 : South Africa vs France: It was a grey evening for the men in green, as they were out-muscled by France 20–13. Brüssow, though, stood up and kept the Springboks in the match with several vital turnovers and tackles. Even though it was a defeat, the match in Toulouse was considered Brüssow's best in a test jersey up to that stage, and was named SA Rugby young player of the year.

=== 2011 ===
- 20 August 2011: After a lengthy injury lay-off, Brüssow returned to the international stage in the Springboks' final two Tri Nations matches of the 2011 season. After a short stint against Australia (13 August 2011), he played a full game against New Zealand All Blacks. With a first-off whitewash on the cards, Brüssow's fetching skills would be vital, in order for the Boks to gain some momentum before the (RWC World Cup 2011). Brüssow delivered a Man-of-the-Match winning performance. One that saw him make some fantastic and crucial turnovers, immense tackles and ball carries while going through an enormous amount of donkey work and taking a boot to the face for his efforts. Brüssow ended the game with a bloodied, pockmarked face and bandage, but most probably assured his place in Peter de Villiers' plans for rugby's greatest stage in New Zealand, the 2011 Rugby World Cup.
- 9 October 2011: After South Africa progress to the quarter finals of the Rugby World Cup they lose 11–9 in Wellington to be knocked out of the competition.

== Tournament Winner Medals ==
Tournament Winner
Year	Tournament	Team	Position
2009	Tri Nations	Springboks	Openside Flanker
2009	British & Irish Lions	Springboks	Openside Flanker
2007	Currie Cup	Free State Cheetahs	Openside Flanker
2006	Currie Cup	Free State Cheetahs	Squad Member
2004	Craven Week	Free State U/18	Openside Flanker

== Awards ==
- 2011
  - South Africa medal for reaching quarter final
- 2009
  - SA Rugby Young Player of the Year
  - Provincial Player of the Castle SA 2009 Lions Series
  - {nominee} SA Player of the Year
- 2008
  - {nominee} Sasol Young Player of the Year
  - {nominee} ABSA Currie Cup Premier Division Player of the Year
