= Craig Burden =

South African rugby union player

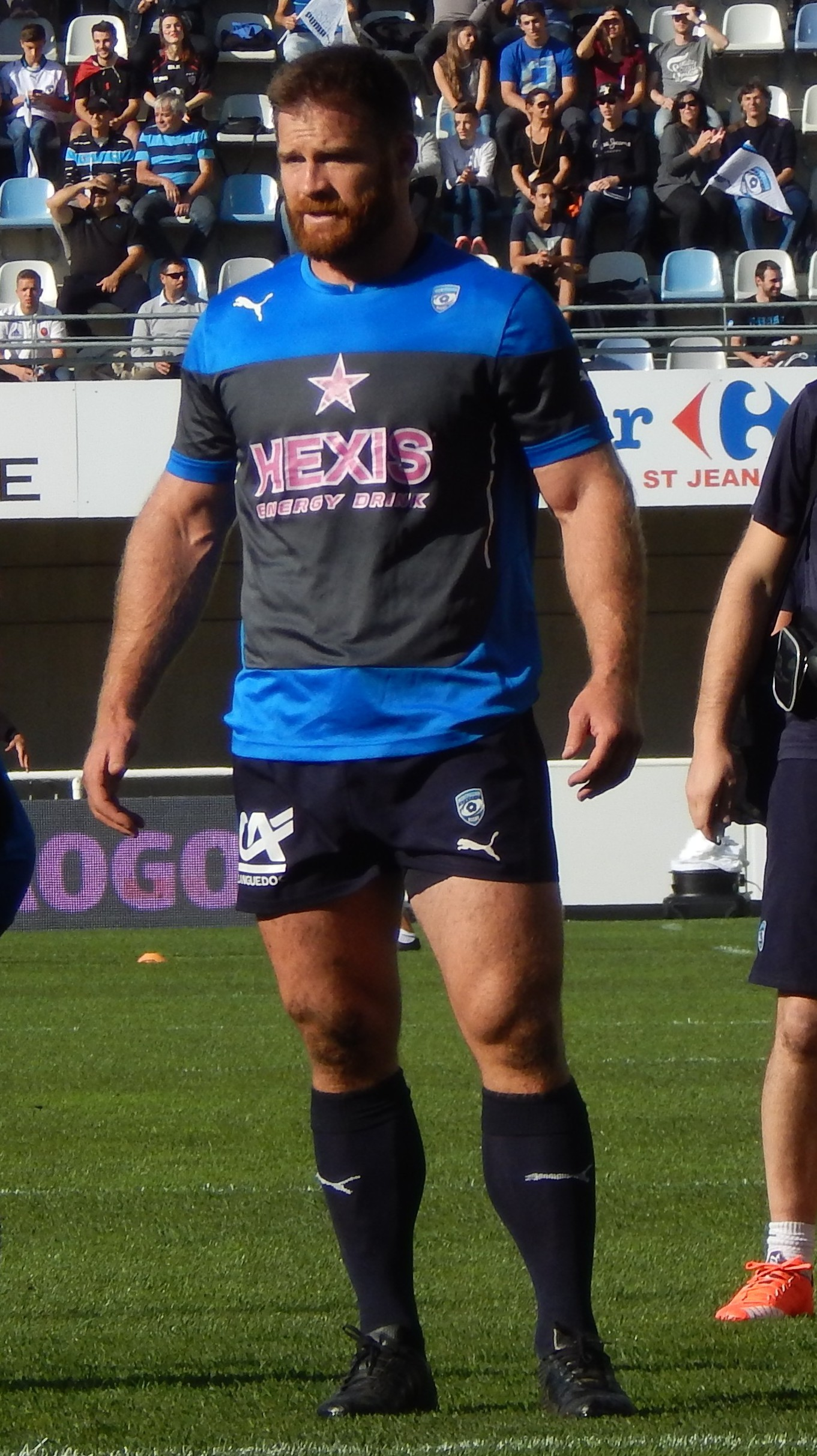
- Full name: Craig Bruce Burden
- Born: 13 March 1985 (age 41) Durban, South Africa
- Height: 1.84 m (6 ft 1/2 in)
- Weight: 100 kg (220 lb)
- School: Maritzburg College

Rugby union career
- Position: Hooker
Senior career
Years	Team	Apps	(Points)
2005–2011	Sharks XV	27	(45)
2005–2013	Sharks (Currie Cup)	71	(115)
2006–2013	Sharks	47	(20)
2007–2010	Sharks Invitational XV	3	(5)
2013–2015	Toulon	31	(0)
2015	→ Montpellier	3	(0)
2015–2018	Stade Français	37	(15)
2019–2020	Sharks	8	(0)
2019	Sharks (Currie Cup)	4	(5)
- Correct as of 28 April 2021

Craig Bruce Burden (born 13 May 1985 in Durban, South Africa) is a former rugby union player for the Sharks in Super Rugby and the Currie Cup. He attended Maritzburg College in Pietermaritzburg where he played at centre. Between 2006 and 2013, he played as a hooker for the Sharks.

In 2007 Burden attended the High Performance Player's Course at the International Rugby Academy NZ (IRANZ). Burden's Positional Coach was former Auckland Blues player Paul Mitchell and Course Facilitator former ITM Cup Coach for the Wellington Lions Chris Boyd.

He joined French Top 14 side Toulon as a medical joker in 2013.

He joined French Top 14 side Montpellier as a World Cup joker in July 2015.

He joined French Top 14 side Stade Français as a medical joker in November 2015.

== Honours ==
Sharks

- Currie Cup: 2010

Toulon

- Heineken Cup European Champions: 2014
- Top 14 French League : 2014
