= Jaco Pretorius =

Retired South African rugby union player

- Born: Jaco Christiaan Pretorius; 10 December 1979 (age 46) Johannesburg, South Africa
- Height: 1.83 m (6 ft 0 in)
- Weight: 94 kg (207 lb; 14 st 11 lb)

Rugby union career
- Position: Outside centre
Provincial / State sides
| Years | Team | Apps | (Points) |
| 2006—2009 | Golden Lions | 22 | (80) |
| 2009—2011 | Blue Bulls | 26 | (35) |
Super Rugby
| Years | Team | Apps | (Points) |
| 2001—2008 | Lions | 29 | (35) |
| 2008—2011 | Bulls | 30 | (5) |
International career
| Years | Team | Apps | (Points) |
| 2006-2007 | Springboks | 2 | (0) |
National sevens team
| Years | Team | | Comps |
| 2006 | Springboks Sevens | | |

Jaco Pretorius (born 10 December 1979) is a retired South African rugby union outside centre.

== Biography ==
Pretorius was born in Johannesburg, South Africa in 1979. He began playing for the Lions in 2001 and served as the Springboks Sevens captain in 2006. In 2007, he was part of the Emerging Springboks team that won the IRB Nations Cup.

He played two games for Barbarian F.C. in 2008 before signing a three-year deal with the Bulls; his debut game was February 14 against the Queensland Reds. The team won the Currie Cup and the Super 14 Final the following year. They also won the 2010 Super 14 Final, though Pretorius was forced to sit out two games into the season due to a fractured eye socket. In 2011, after fourteen years of playing rugby, Pretorius announced he would be retiring due to a back injury.
