= Ryan Kankowski =

South African professional rugby union player

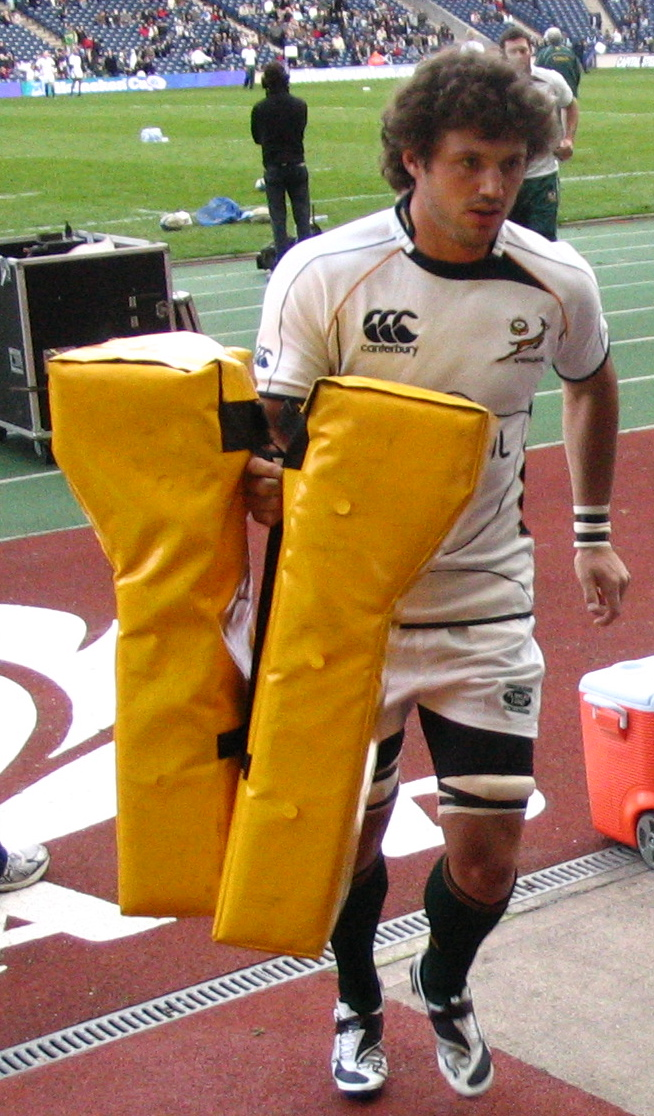
- Kankowski in 2008
- Born: 14 October 1985 (age 41) Port Elizabeth, South Africa
- Height: 1.93 m (6 ft 4 in)
- Weight: 106 kg (234 lb; 16 st 10 lb)
- School: St Andrew's College

Rugby union career
- Position: Number eight/Flanker
- Current team: NTT DoCoMo Red Hurricanes
Senior career
Years	Team	Apps	(Points)
2006–2015	Sharks	104	(95)
2006–2011	Sharks (Currie Cup)	64	(80)
2009–2013	Sharks XV	3	(0)
2013–2017	Toyota Industries Shuttles	51	(80)
2017	Golden Lions	7	(5)
2017–2018	NTT DoCoMo Red Hurricanes	9	(5)
- Correct as of 30 July 2017
International career
Years	Team	Apps	(Points)
2006	South Africa Sevens		
2007–2012	South Africa (test)	20	(5)
2007–2012	South Africa (tour)	2	(0)
- Correct as of 30 July 2017

Ryan Kankowski (born 14 October 1985) is a South African professional rugby union player, who played for the South Africa national rugby union team between 2007 and 2012.

Kankowski plays at number eight or openside flanker.

Kankowski was first selected to represent South Africa during the Springboks 2007 end of year tour to Wales and England. He made a try-scoring test debut on the tour as a substitute during South Africa's 34–12 victory over Wales at the Millennium Stadium on 24 November 2007.

Thirteen of his twenty test caps were earned as a substitute. His most productive year was in 2008, receiving award nominations for his performances at Super Rugby and provincial level and was subsequently rewarded by being part of the Springboks Incoming Tour, their Tri Nations squad and their end of year Outgoing Tour. He was also part of the Springbok squad selected to play three tests against the British & Irish Lions on their tour of South Africa in 2009.

In June 2012, it was announced that he would join Japanese team Toyota Verblitz for six months. He would miss the 2012 Currie Cup Premier Division season with theSharks, but would return to theSharks for the 2013 Super Rugby season.

In June 2017, it was announced that Kankowski would join the Golden Lions for the 2017 Currie Cup season.

== Awards and nominations ==
- 2008 SA Rugby Player of the Year nominee
- 2008 Sasol Player of the Year nominee
- 2008 Vodacom Super 14 South African Player of the Year
- 2008 ABSA Currie Cup – Premier Division Player of the Year nominee
