= Jovan Bowles =

South African rugby player (born 1983)

- Born: Jovan Jacques Bowles; 27 June 1983 (age 43) Durban, South Africa
- Height: 1.87 m (6 ft 2 in)
- Weight: 115 kg (254 lb)
- School: St Henry's Marist Brothers' College
- Occupation: Professional rugby union footballer

Rugby union career
- Position: outside centre
Provincial / State sides
Years	Team	Apps	(Points)
2001-2005	Sharks		
2006	Falcons		
2008	Bulldogs		
2009-2011	Platinum Leopards		
National sevens team
Years	Team		Comps
2006	South Africa 7s		7

Jovan Jacques Bowles (born 27 June 1983 in Durban, South Africa) is a South African rugby union footballer who is currently playing for the Border Bulldogs. He plays the position of centre.

Bowles attended St Henry's Marist Brothers' College where he was head boy in 2000 and played in the first rugby team from 1998 to 2000. He was captain of the South African Emerging Sevens team when they won the Tusker Sevens tournament in Kenya in 2006 and 2007. He is the brother of Maso Bowles who played for the Springbok under 21 side in the 2000 u/21 SANZAR series in which John Smit captained the side to victory in the series.

Bowles made his debut for the Springbok Sevens in 2006 at Dubai where the Springbok Sevens team went on to win that leg of the IRB Sevens World Series.
