= Frans Viljoen =

South African rugby union player

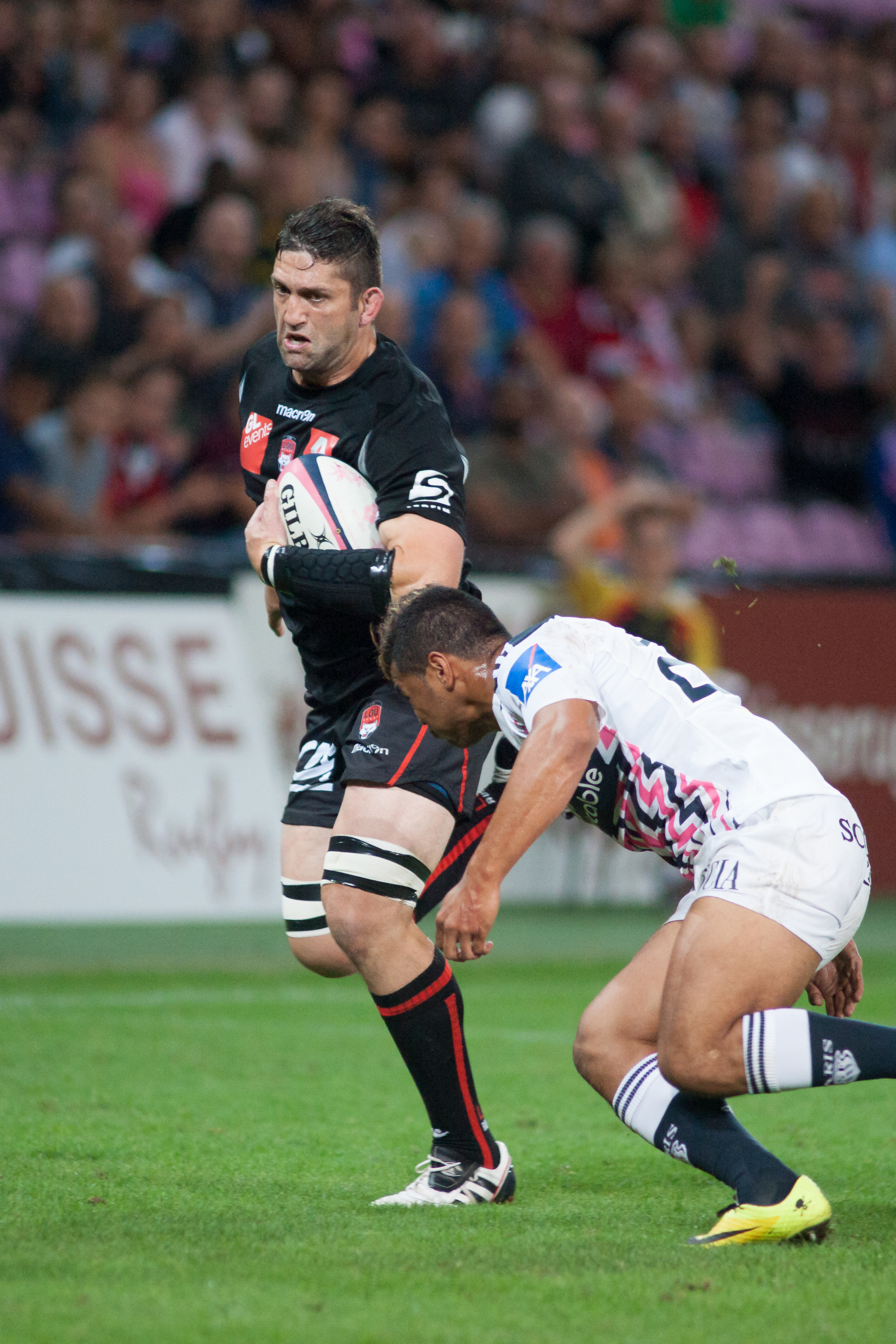
- Full name: Francois Jakobus Viljoen
- Born: 22 October 1982 (age 44) Ficksburg, South Africa
- Height: 1.90 m (6 ft 3 in)
- Weight: 112 kg (17 st 9 lb; 247 lb)
- School: Grey College, Bloemfontein
- University: North-West University

Rugby union career
- Position: Flanker / Number Eight
Youth career
- Leopards: 2002
Senior career
Years	Team	Apps	(Points)
2003–2004	Leopards		
2005–2008	Griquas	52	(55)
2006–2011	Cheetahs	26	(10)
2006–2007	→ Stade Français	10	(10)
2009–2011	Free State Cheetahs	18	(40)
2011–2012	Aironi	9	(0)
2012–2013	Free State Cheetahs	3	(5)
2012	→ Griffons	1	(0)
2013	Cheetahs	8	(0)
2013–2015	Lyon	27	(15)
- Correct as of 11 January 2016

Francois Jakobus 'Frans' Viljoen (born 22 October 1982) is a South African rugby union footballer who plays as a loose forward.

== Career ==
Viljoen represented the Free State Cheetahs in the Currie Cup and the Cheetahs in Super Rugby. He has had something of a nomadic career with spells playing for the Leopards and Griquas in his home country and Aironi in Italy. He has also completed short loan spells for Stade Français and the Griffons.

Only 13 July 2013 it was announced that Viljoen would join French side Lyon.
