= Tewis de Bruyn =

South African rugby union player

- Full name: Mattheus Johannes de Bruyn
- Born: 5 August 1982 (age 44) Hoopstad, South Africa
- Height: 1.74 m (5 ft 8 1/2 in)
- Weight: 86 kg (13 st 8 lb; 190 lb)
- School: Grey College, Bloemfontein
- University: Potchefstroom University

Rugby union career
- Position: Scrum-Half / Fly-Half
Youth career
- 2002: Leopards
Senior career
Years	Team	Apps	(Points)
2002–2003	Leopards		
2004–2006	SWD Eagles	6	(5)
2006–2007	Boland Cavaliers	7	(2)
2007–2013	Free State Cheetahs	75	(190)
2008–2013	Cheetahs	57	(25)
2011	→ Lyon	7	(3)
2013	→ Griffons	1	(0)
- Correct as of 26 July 2013

Tewis de Bruyn (born 5 August 1982) is a South African former rugby union footballer. He regularly played as a scrum-half and occasionally as a fly-half. He represented the Free State Cheetahs in the Currie Cup and Vodacom Cup competitions and the Cheetahs in Super Rugby for the majority of his career. He retired at the end of the 2013 season following a back injury to take up a coaching role at his alma mater, Grey College, Bloemfontein.

== Career ==
De Bruyn started his career playing for the Potchefstroom–based Leopards and spent two seasons there before transferring to the SWD Eagles in 2004. He moved again in 2006, joining the Boland Cavaliers before finally moving to Bloemfontein in late 2007. He played more than 130 games in all competitions for the Cheetahs.

De Bruyn had brief loan spells at the French side Lyon in 2011 and the Griffons in 2013.
