= Rory Kockott =

France international rugby union player

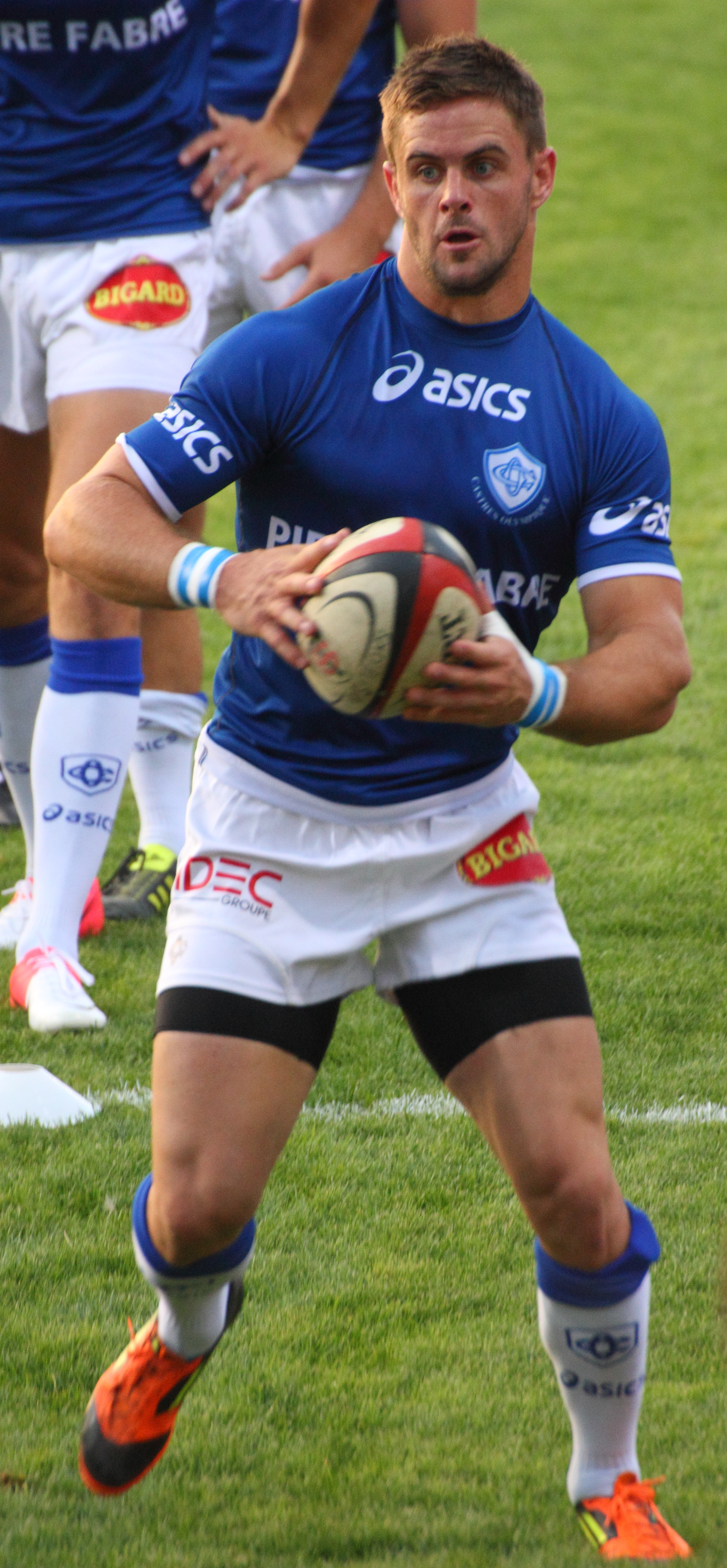
- Kockott playing for Castres Olympique
- Born: Rory Kockott; 25 June 1986 (age 40) East London, South Africa
- Height: 1.80 m (5 ft 11 in)
- Weight: 92 kg (203 lb)
- School: Selborne College

Rugby union career
- Position: Scrumhalf
Senior career
Years	Team	Apps	(Points)
2011–2023	Castres Olympique	219	(1,297)
2023-	Stade Français	19	(10)
- Correct as of 28 June 2024
Provincial / State sides
Years	Team	Apps	(Points)
2006	Golden Lions	3	(7)
2007–10	Sharks	46	(249)
Super Rugby
Years	Team	Apps	(Points)
2007–10	Sharks	50	(245)
2011	Lions	11	(5)
International career
Years	Team	Apps	(Points)
2014–2015	France	11	(15)
- Correct as of 17 October 2015

Rory Kockott (born 25 June 1986) is a professional rugby union player who plays as scrum-half for Stade Français in France's Top 14. Born in South Africa, he played for the France national team

== Career ==
=== South Africa ===
Kockott played in South Africa for five years. He started in 2006 playing for the Sharks in the 2006 Super 14 season. In that season, Kockott was second choice in his position, only making one start in 12 appearances. In his debut season, the Sharks finished fifth, narrowly missing out on a semi-final berth by two points based on points difference. Later that year, he played in the 2006 Currie Cup Premier Division for the Golden Lions, but was a brief stint, signing with his Super Rugby province, the Sharks, for the following year. In the 2007 season, he made more starts as the Sharks finished top of the table in the regular season. After making it to a South African derby final, the Sharks lost narrowly to the Bulls 20–19, despite playing at home, with Kockott coming off the bench during the match.

In the 2008 Super 14 season, in all 12 matches in which Kockott played, he started. During this season, the Sharks finished third in the regular season, but were knocked out by the Waratahs in the semi-finals. For the 2010 Super 14 season, Kockott signed with the Lions, after failing to play in many matches for the Sharks in the previous season. The Lions finished bottom of the table in 2011, prompting Kockott to move elsewhere.

=== France ===
In 2011, he was signed by Castres Olympique. In his debut season in France, he helped guide Castres to the Top 14 semi-finals, where they lost to Toulouse 24–15. He started almost every match in the 2012–13 Top 14 season, which was a championship victory for Castres. Kockott scored 13 of their 19 points in the final against RC Toulonnais who had just won the European cup a few weeks ago, earning him the man of the match award. His try in the final, against the likes of Jonny Wilkinson, Bakkies Botha or Matt Giteau, was one of the key moments in the final. He also finished as the league's top point scorer with 376 points, and was named player of the tournament.

The year after, he helped Castres reach the final again, in a rematch against Toulon. This time, however, Toulon earned the victory 18-10.

In the 2017-18 Top 14 season, Castres finished the season 6th, clinching the last spot for the play-offs. Against all odds, the team managed to beat Stade Toulousain, which finished the regular season third, in the quarter-final, Racing 92, which finished second, in the semi-final and Montpellier Hérault Rugby, which finished first, in the final. During the final, Kockott displayed a solid performance, from the first to the last whistle blow. He outplayed former teammate and rival at Sharks, Ruan Pienaar, leading Castres to a comfortable win 29-13.

== International ==
Some South African commentators believed South Africa should have selected Kockott before he became eligible for France in August 2014. Even former South African coach Nick Mallett urged Kockott to confront Heyneke Meyer about playing for the Springboks. In August 2014, Meyer eliminated Kockott from Springbok selection after first-choice scrum half Fourie du Preez was injured.

After three years playing for Castres, Kockott qualified for to play for France on residency grounds. He was selected for the France squad for the 2014 November internationals. He made his debut on 8 November 2014, coming off the bench in a 40–15 win over Fiji. He started his first game for France on 7 February during the 2015 Six Nations Championship match against Scotland; France won 15–8. He was selected in the France squad for the Rugby World Cup 2015.
