= Marius Delport (rugby union) =

South African rugby union player

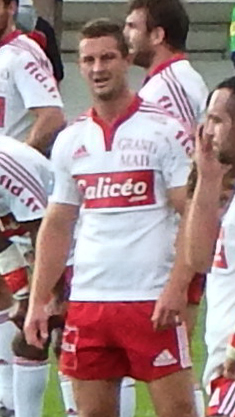
- Born: 6 March 1985 (age 41) Pretoria, South Africa
- Height: 6 ft 4 in (193 cm)
- Weight: 198 lb (90 kg)
- School: Hoërskool Zwartkop

Rugby union career
- Position: Centre
Senior career
Years	Team	Apps	(Points)
2013–15	US Dax		
2015–16	Rugby Viadana		
Provincial / State sides
Years	Team	Apps	(Points)
2005–09	Blue Bulls		
2010–11	Golden Lions		
Super Rugby
Years	Team	Apps	(Points)
2007–09	Bulls		
2010	Lions		

Marius Delport (born 6 March 1985) is a South African former professional rugby union player.

== Early years ==
Delport was born in Pretoria and educated at Hoërskool Zwartkop in Centurion. He represented South Africa's under-19 and under-21 national sides, captaining the latter to victory in the 2005 World Championships.

== Professional rugby ==
Delport was in the Emerging Springboks side that won the 2007 IRB Nations Cup.

A centre, Delport started his Currie Cup career with the Blue Bulls, during which time he earned the occasional Super 14 call up for the Bulls. He was often restricted to the bench, including for the 2009 Super 14 final win over the Chiefs, prompting a move to the Lions in 2010 seeking more opportunities.

Delport left South African rugby in 2013 and had three seasons playing in Europe, linking up first with French Pro D2 side US Dax. He left at the end of his second season after the team came close to relegation, signing a one-year contract with Italian club Viadana, coached by his former Bulls teammate Casper Steyn.
