= Morné Steyn =

South African rugby union player

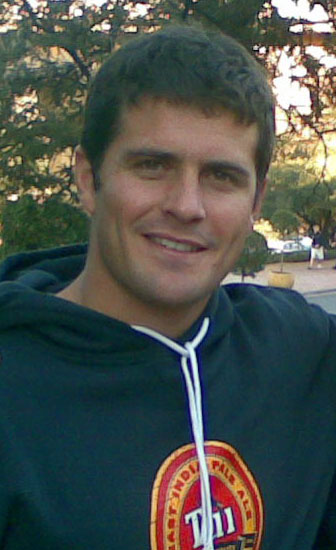
- Steyn in 2009
- Born: 11 July 1984 (age 42) Cape Town, Cape Province, Republic of South Africa
- Height: 1.84 m (6 ft 1/2 in)
- Weight: 91 kg (201 lb; 14 st 5 lb)
- School: Hoërskool Sand du Plessis

Rugby union career
- Position: Fly-half
Senior career
Years	Team	Apps	(Points)
2013–2020	Stade Français	135	(725)
- Correct as of 2021
Provincial / State sides
Years	Team	Apps	(Points)
2003–2013, 2020–2023	Blue Bulls	75	(828)
- Correct as of 2025
Super Rugby
Years	Team	Apps	(Points)
2005–2013, 2020–2023	Bulls	153	(1,665)
- Correct as of 2025
International career
Years	Team	Apps	(Points)
2009–2021	South Africa	68	(742)
- Correct as of 2021
Medal record
Men's Rugby union
Representing South Africa
Rugby World Cup
Bronze medal – third place	2015 England	Squad

Morné Steyn (born 11 July 1984) is a South African former professional rugby union player who played as a fly-half.

Steyn has won an Under-21 World Cup, three Currie Cups, three Super Rugby titles, one Super Rugby unlocked, one Tri-Nations, one French Top 14 title and is the only player in history to win two British and Irish Lions series as part of the hosting side.

== Playing career ==
With the Bulls, he was a member of the team that won Super Rugby in 2007, 2009 and 2010. In 2009 and 2010, he was the leading point scorer in the league. In the 2009 semi-final against the Crusaders, he kicked four drop goals, a league record for a single game.

From 2013 to 2020, he played in the French Top 14 for Stade Français. He made his debut on 30 August 2013 in a 38–3 win over Biarritz. Coming on in the 60th minute, he scored four points by converting two tries.

=== South Africa ===
In early 2009, South Africa coach Peter de Villiers stated his preference for Ruan Pienaar in the Springbok number 10 jersey despite Steyn performing very well in the Super 14 tournament. Steyn was on the replacement bench during the second test of the 2009 British & Irish Lions tour to South Africa, when Pienaar's kicking game disintegrated. Steyn replaced Pienaar and immediately slotted two conversions and two penalties – including one from 53 metres (58 yd) in the dying minutes of the game, which gave the Springboks the match and the series in dramatic fashion.

On 1 August 2009, South Africa beat New Zealand 31–19 in their 2009 Tri Nations Series match in Durban. On only his fifth cap and his second start, Steyn scored all of the Springboks' 31 points (8 penalty kicks, as well as converting his own try). This broke several records, among them the record for the most points by an individual in a Tri Nations match, previously held by Andrew Mehrtens with his 29 points against Australia in 1999 (one conversion and nine penalties).

Steyn scored the most points by a player at the 2011 Rugby World Cup, 62 points.

In August 2021, having not played for South Africa since 2016, he was selected as a substitute for the deciding third test against the British & Irish Lions. He replaced Handré Pollard in the second half, and, as he had in 2009, kicked two late penalties to help South Africa win the game and the series.

== Honours ==
- Currie Cup (2) 2006, 2009
- Currie Cup runner up (2) 2005, 2008
- Vodacom Cup runner up 2004
- Super Rugby (3) 2007, 2009, 2010
- Super Rugby Unlocked (1)
- Pro 14 Rainbow Cup runner up
- Top 14 (1)
- EPCR Challenge Cup (1): 2017
- The Rugby Championship (1)
- British and Irish Lions Tours (2) 2009, 2021
