= Gio Aplon =

South African rugby union player

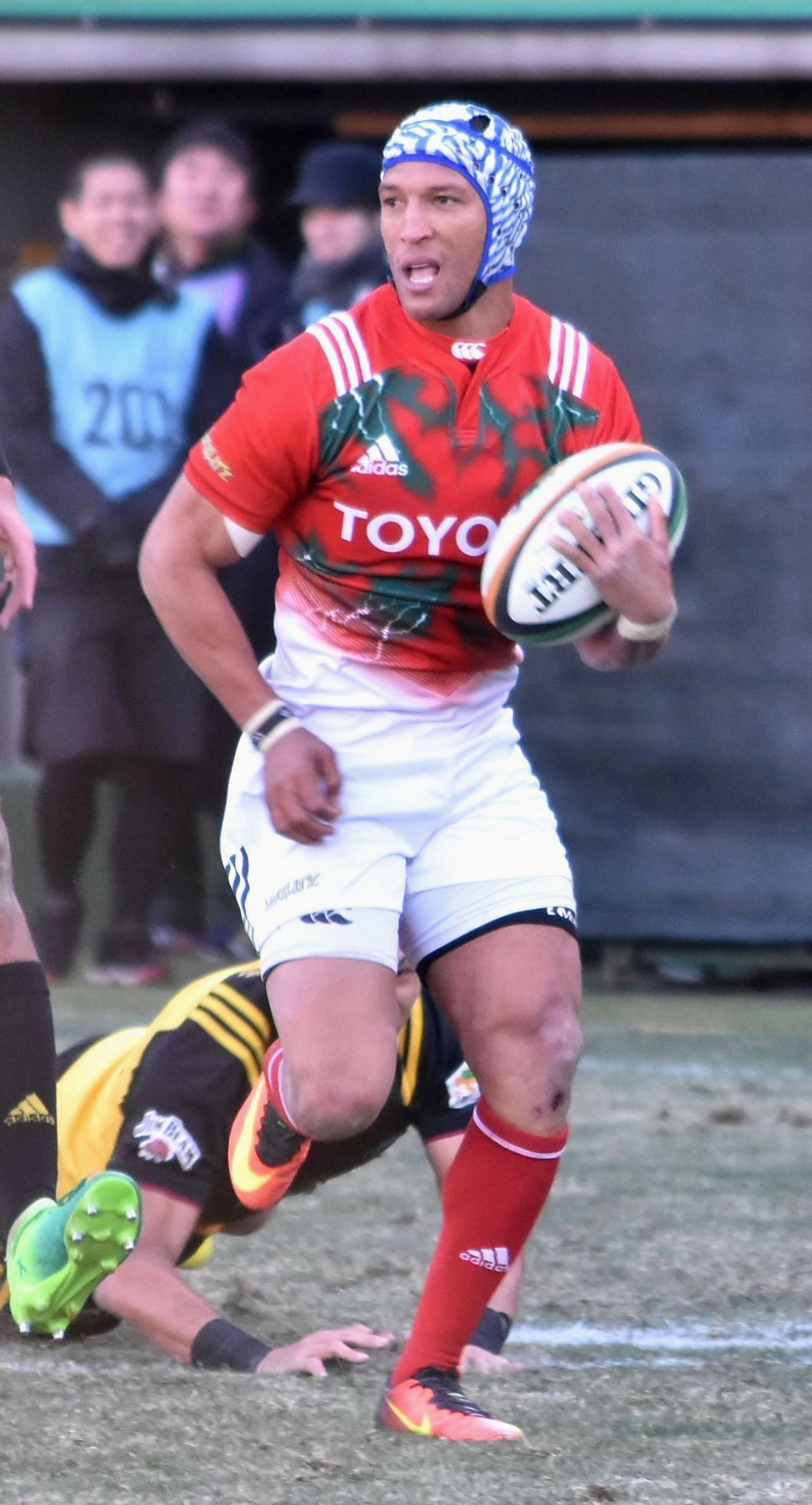
- Full name: Gio Giaan Aplon
- Born: 6 October 1982 (age 44) Hawston, South Africa
- Height: 1.75 m (5 ft 9 in)
- Weight: 78 kg (12 st 4 lb; 172 lb)
- School: Hawston Secondary, Hawston

Rugby union career
- Position: Fullback / Wing
Senior career
Years	Team	Apps	(Points)
2005–2013	Western Province	96	(174)
2007–2014	Stormers	84	(91)
2014–2017	Grenoble	62	(82)
2017–2020	Toyota Verblitz	23	(50)
2020–2021	Bulls	4	(0)
2021	Blue Bulls	1	(0)
- Correct as of 16 September 2022
International career
Years	Team	Apps	(Points)
2006–2007	South Africa Sevens		
2010–2012	South Africa (test)	17	(25)
2010	South Africa (tour)	1	(0)
- Correct as of 21 March 2015

Gio Giaan Aplon (born 6 October 1982) is a former South African rugby union player. In 2010 he scored two tries in a 42–17 triumph against the Six Nations winner – France. The match was also his debut playing as a South African winger number 14. He is considered to be one of the first small wings in South Africa after the likes of Breyton Paulse. These players are the inspirations of guys like Cheslin Kolbe, Kurt-Lee Arendse and many more.

== Career ==
Aplon is a winger who played for the Stormers. He also has had a very successful South African sevens career. He has blistering speed and is known as the "pocket dynamo". Playing with the Stormers gave him confidence. Even though he is small in stature, his speed and elusiveness causes the opposition much grief. He is known for his side steps and is a versatile backline player. Known affectionately by the nickname "Appels" (Afrikaans for Apples) by fans due to his surname, he has become a firm favourite amongst Bok supporters. During the Test in Cape Town against the French on 12 June 2010 he scored 2 tries and was named Man of the Match.

Aplon was part of the winning Western Province Currie Cup side in 2012.

On 13 May 2020, Aplon was announced as Jake White's first signing as the Blue Bulls coach.

=== Grenoble ===
Aplon signed a deal to join French side Grenoble after the 2014 Super Rugby season.

== Childhood ==
Aplon was born in Hawston, a small town to the east of Cape Town. Before he started playing rugby, he was in the cricket side for his school.
