= Willem de Waal =

South African rugby union player

- Born: Willem de Waal; 17 February 1978 (age 48) Paarl, South Africa
- Height: 1.91 m (6 ft 3 in)
- Weight: 95 kg (209 lb)
- School: Boland Agricultural High School
- University: Stellenbosch University

Rugby union career
- Position: Fly-half
Senior career
Years	Team	Apps	(Points)
2007–2008	Narbonne	26	(196)
2010–present	Treviso	23	(145)
- Correct as of 22 November 2012
Provincial / State sides
Years	Team	Apps	(Points)
2002–2003	Leopards	?	(?)
2004–2007	Free State	40	(811)
2008–2010	Western Province	30	(422)
- Correct as of 22 November 2012
Super Rugby
Years	Team	Apps	(Points)
2004	Bulls	10	(31)
2005	Cats	4	(0)
2006–2007	Cheetahs	15	(109)
2009–2010	Stormers	16	(59)
- Correct as of 22 November 2012

Willem de Waal (born 17 February 1978 in Paarl, South Africa) is a South African rugby union footballer who is currently playing for Benetton Treviso in the Pro14 competition. He plays in the position of fly-half. Like Joost van der Westhuizen at scrum-half, de Waal is unusually big for a fly-half.

== Career ==
De Waal played rugby for Stellenbosch University before making his provincial debut with the Leopards in 2002. He then moved to the Free State Cheetahs in 2004 where he would experience his greatest success so far. In each of his four seasons at the club, the Cheetahs made it to the final of the Currie Cup, winning twice and sharing one.

De Waal has also played at Super Rugby level, making his debut with the Bulls in 2004 before joining the Cats in 2005. When the competition expanded to 14 teams in 2006, the Cats split into two separate franchises – the Lions and the Cheetahs, which de Waal joined.

On 24 July 2007, it was announced that de Waal signed a two-year deal with French Second Division club RC Narbonne. He returned to South Africa after one season and secured a spot in the 2009 Stormers squad, his fourth different super rugby team. He also played in the Currie Cup for Western Province that same season.
