= 2008 Vodacom Cup =

- Countries: South Africa
- Date: 22 February – 16 May 2008
- Champions: Blue Bulls (2nd title)
- Runners-up: Free State Cheetahs
- Matches played: 56
- Top point scorer: Isma-eel Dollie (125)
- Top try scorer: Rocco Jansen (14)

The 2008 Vodacom Cup was played between 22 February and 16 May 2008 and was the 11th edition of this annual domestic cup competition. This edition of the Vodacom Cup was played between the fourteen provincial rugby union teams in South Africa from the Currie Cup Premier and First Divisions.

== Competition ==
There were fourteen teams participating in the 2008 Vodacom Cup competition. These teams were geographically divided into two sections - the Northern Section and the Southern Section – with seven teams in each section. Teams played all the teams in the other section once over the course of the season, either at home or away.

Teams received four points for a win and two points for a draw. Bonus points were awarded to teams that scored four or more tries in a game, as well as to teams that lost a match by seven points or less. Teams were ranked by points, then points difference (points scored less points conceded).

The top four teams in each section qualified for the play-offs. In the quarter finals, the teams that finished first in each section had home advantage against the teams that finished fourth in the other section and the teams that finished second in each section had home advantage against the teams that finished third in the other section. The winners of these quarter finals then played each other in the semi-finals, with the higher placed team having home advantage. The two semi-final winners then met in the final.

== Teams ==
Location of teams in 2008 Vodacom Cup
Northern Section
Southern Section

=== Changes from 2007 ===
- There were no changes from the 2007 Vodacom Cup.

=== Team listing ===
The following teams took part in the 2008 Vodacom Cup competition:

Northern Section
Team	Stadium/s
Blue Bulls	Loftus Versfeld, Pretoria
Blue Bulls	Brits Sports Ground, Brits
Falcons	Bosman Stadium, Brakpan
Falcons	ERU Rugby Club, Reiger Park
Falcons	HTS Sasolburg, Sasolburg
Golden Lions	Ellis Park Stadium, Johannesburg
Golden Lions	Union Rugby Club, Johannesburg
Griffons	North West Stadium, Welkom
Griquas	Griqua Park, Kimberley
Leopards	Profert Olën Park, Potchefstroom
Leopards	Olympia Park, Rustenburg
Pumas	Puma Stadium, Witbank

Southern Section
Team	Stadium/s
Boland Cavaliers	Boland Stadium, Wellington
Boland Cavaliers	Vredendal Sports Grounds, Vredendal
Border Bulldogs	Absa Stadium, East London
Mighty Elephants	EPRU Stadium, Port Elizabeth
Mighty Elephants	Adcock Stadium, Port Elizabeth
Mighty Elephants	Wolfson Stadium, KwaZakele
Free State Cheetahs	Vodacom Park, Bloemfontein
Free State Cheetahs	Petrusburg Sports Grounds, Petrusburg
Free State Cheetahs	Hoopstad Stadium, Hoopstad
Natal Wildebeest	Absa Stadium, Durban
Natal Wildebeest	Woodburn Stadium, Pietermaritzburg
SWD Eagles	Outeniqua Park, George
SWD Eagles	Rustdene Sports Grounds, Beaufort West
SWD Eagles	Uniondale
Western Province	Newlands Stadium, Cape Town
Western Province	Bellville South
Western Province	Brookside, Cape Town
Western Province	Faure Street Stadium, Paarl

== Tables ==
=== Northern Section ===
2008 Vodacom Cup Northern Section log
Pos	Team	Rnd	W	D	L	PF	PA	PD	TF	TA	TB	LB	Pts
1	Blue Bulls	7	5	0	2	279	161	+118	36	18	6	2	28
2	Griquas	7	5	1	1	259	117	+142	34	16	4	1	27
3	Leopards	7	4	0	3	225	192	+33	30	24	5	1	22
4	Golden Lions	7	3	0	4	200	151	+49	26	18	4	3	19
5	Falcons	7	3	0	4	212	238	−26	31	29	5	2	19
6	Pumas	7	3	0	4	198	226	−28	26	31	2	0	14
7	Griffons	7	1	0	6	106	303	−197	14	42	2	0	6
Blue Bulls, Golden Lions, Griquas and Leopards qualified to the quarter-finals. * Legend: Pos = Position, Pl = Played, W = Won, D = Drawn, L = Lost, PF = Points for, PA = Points against, PD = Points difference, TF = Tries for, TA = Tries against, Pts = Log points Points breakdown: *4 points for a win *2 points for a draw *1 bonus point for a loss by seven points or less *1 bonus point for scoring four or more tries in a match

=== Southern Section ===
2008 Vodacom Cup Southern Section log
Pos	Team	Rnd	W	D	L	PF	PA	PD	TF	TA	TB	LB	Pts
1	Western Province	7	6	1	0	268	137	+131	32	17	3	0	29
2	Free State Cheetahs	7	5	0	2	266	248	+18	36	32	5	0	25
3	Boland Cavaliers	7	5	0	2	236	172	+64	30	21	3	1	24
4	Natal Wildebeest	7	3	0	4	152	178	−26	20	22	3	2	17
5	SWD Eagles	7	3	0	4	188	197	−9	25	28	2	1	15
6	Mighty Elephants	7	2	0	5	174	279	−105	22	40	4	1	13
7	Border Bulldogs	7	0	0	7	104	268	−164	13	37	0	0	0
Boland Cavaliers, Free State Cheetahs, Natal Wildebeest and Western Province qualified to the quarter-finals. * Legend: Pos = Position, Pl = Played, W = Won, D = Drawn, L = Lost, PF = Points for, PA = Points against, PD = Points difference, TF = Tries for, TA = Tries against, Pts = Log points Points breakdown: *4 points for a win *2 points for a draw *1 bonus point for a loss by seven points or less *1 bonus point for scoring four or more tries in a match

== Results ==
=== Round one ===
22 February 2008	Free State Cheetahs	42–36	Golden Lions	Vodacom Park, Bloemfontein
15:30	Try: Herman Pretorius 24'; Ashley Johnson 45'; Jaco du Toit 51'; Nicky Steyn 56'; Jongi Nokwe 74'; Con: Jannie Myburgh 46', 52', 57', 75' (4/5); Pen: Jannie Myburgh 17', 64', 69' (3/3)	Scoreboard	Try: Arno Coetzee 61'; Justin St Jerry 67'; Gerhardus Lourens Meyer 78'; Clinton de Klerk 80'; Con: Arno Coetzee 62', 68' (2/4); Pen: Arno Coetzee 6', 27', 54' (3/4); Drop: Michael Killian 37' (1/1)	Attendance: 1,000; Referee: Deon van Blommestein

22 February 2008	SWD Eagles	33–27	Blue Bulls	Outeniqua Park, George
18:00	Try: Henry Grimes 28'; Allister Kettledas 69'; Hendrik van der Nest 80'; Con: Nel Fourie 29', 70', 81' (3/3); Pen: Nel Fourie 5', 10', 53', 61' (4/5); Drop: Nel Fourie (0/1); Cards: Doppies le Roux (yellow card) 37' to 51'; Wickus Harmse (yellow card) 65' to 76'; Hendrik van der Nest (yellow card) 89'	Scoreboard	Try: Stephan Dippenaar 39'; Rocco Jansen 67', 85'; Okkie Kruger 74'; Con: Francois Brummer (0/2); Ruan Boshoff 75', 86' (2/3); Pen: Francois Brummer 47' (1/3); Drop: Francois Brummer (0/1); Cards: Dean Greyling (yellow card) 10' to 20'	Attendance: 356; Referee: Francois Veldsman

22 February 2008	Border Bulldogs	5–15	Griquas	Absa Stadium, East London
19:00	Try: Andries Kruger 41'; Con: Andisa Gqobo (0/1); Pen: Andisa Gqobo (0/2); Cards: Brett Nel (yellow card) 46'; Andries Kruger (yellow card) 65' to 76'	Scoreboard	Try: Dougie Hellmuth 4'; Bjorn Basson 49'; Con: Riaan Viljoen 50' (1/2); Pen: Riaan Viljoen 11' (1/1); Cards: Frans Viljoen (yellow card) 31'; Wayne van Heerden (yellow card) 57'; Bjorn Basson (yellow card) 75'	Attendance: 500; Referee: Mtheleni Msileni

23 February 2008	Natal Wildebeest	10–30	Pumas	Absa Stadium, Durban
14:30	Try: Andries Strauss 21'; Con: Andries Strauss 22' (1/1); Pen: Scott Spedding 14' (1/3); Cards: Henno Mentz (yellow card) 57' to 67'	Scoreboard	Try: Quintin Minnaar 39'; Jacques Coetzee 44'; Rudi Vogt 60'; Con: Rudi Vogt 40', 45', 61' (3/3); Pen: Rudi Vogt 8', 43', 58' (3/3); Cards: Corné Steenkamp (yellow card) 26' to 36'	Attendance: 5,000; Referee: Mlungiseleli Mdashe

23 February 2008	Mighty Elephants	14–32	Leopards	Adcock Stadium, Port Elizabeth
15:30	Try: Marlon Lewis 1'; Con: Ossie Damons (0/1); Pen: Ossie Damons 23', 34', 39' (3/3); Cards: Sebastian Hilpert (yellow card) 60' to 69'	Scoreboard	Try: Anvor Schooney 14', 25'; Riaan Swanepoel 51'; Pellow van der Westhuizen 73'; André Swanepoel 76'; Con: Anvor Schooney 15', 26' (2/4); Clayton Durand (0/1); Pen: WD Botha (0/2); Anvor Schooney 72' (1/1); Cards: Basil de Doncker (yellow card) 59' to 69'	Attendance: 600; Referee: Matt Kemp

23 February 2008	Boland Cavaliers	31–22	Falcons	Boland Stadium, Wellington
16:00	Try: Alshaun Bock 8'; Zolani Mofu 50'; Kobus Meintjes 65'; Con: Justin Peach 9', 66' (2/3); Pen: Justin Peach 21', 62', 75' (3/5); Drop: Elgar Watts 78' (1/1); Cards: Andries Human (yellow card) 26' to 36'	Scoreboard	Try: Dean Okkers 26'; Rouan Cloete 33'; Warren Perkins 41'; Con: Poerie van Rooyen 27', 42' (2/3); Pen: Poerie van Rooyen 24' (1/1)	Attendance: 200; Referee: Gareth Lloyd-Jones

23 February 2008	Western Province	51–7	Griffons	Bellville South
16:00	Try: Boetie Britz 2', 21'; Terry Jacobs 33', 58', 78'; Morgan Newman 39'; PJ Vermeulen 47'; Con: Morgan Newman 3', 34', 40', 59' (4/6); Charl Weideman 79' (1/1); Pen: Morgan Newman 12', 36' (2/4)	Scoreboard	Try: Werner Griesel 75'; Con: Cecil Afrika 76' (1/1)	Attendance: 1,500; Referee: Chris Healy

=== Round two ===
29 February 2008	Golden Lions	14–16	Western Province	Ellis Park Stadium, Johannesburg
16:00	Try: Francois Uys 33'; Con: Arno Coetzee (0/1); Pen: Arno Coetzee 13', 18', 44' (3/4); Jody Rose (0/1)	Scoreboard	Try: David Hendricks 8'; Con: Isma-eel Dollie 9' (1/1); Pen: Isma-eel Dollie 4', 16', 56' (3/5); Cards: Terry Jacobs (yellow card) 76'	Referee: Jaco Peyper

29 February 2008	Griffons	41–27	Border Bulldogs	North West Stadium, Welkom
19:00	Try: Gys Briedenhann 23'; Gideon Pienaar 26'; Nicolaas Pretorius 39'; Shane Hancke 60'; Juan de Wit 81'; Con: Johann van Niekerk 24', 27', 40', 61', 82' (5/5); Pen: Johann van Niekerk 13', 71' (2/2)	Scoreboard	Try: Ziniko Dumaphi 20'; Warren Bowles 36'; Solly Tyibilika 68'; Con: Russel Jeacocks 21' (1/1); Stuart Hudson 37', 69' (2/2); Pen: Stuart Hudson 30', 51' (2/2)	Attendance: 150; Referee: Christie du Preez

29 February 2008	Pumas	57–17	Mighty Elephants	Puma Stadium, Witbank
19:00	Try: Ashton Constant 2'; Sasha Marot 17'; Morné Kruger 21'; Dawie Steyn 40'; Corné Steenkamp 44'; Gordon Pangetti 63', 69'; Shaun Venter 93'; Con: Rudi Vogt 3', 18', 22', 41', 64', 70' (6/7); Jacques Coetzee 94' (1/1); Pen: Rudi Vogt 52' (1/2)	Scoreboard	Try: Ossie Damons 77'; Jerome Williams 86'; Con: Deon Booysen 78', 87' (2/2); Pen: Ossie Damons 10' (1/3); Cards: Shaun Nel (yellow card) 57' to 67'; Ricardo van Wyk (yellow card) 60' to 70'	Attendance: 1,000; Referee: Sandile Mayende

1 March 2008	Falcons	33–36	Free State Cheetahs	HTS Sasolburg, Sasolburg
15:00	Try: Luvo Sogidashe 19'; Wium Arlow 33', 79'; Len Olivier 57'; Dean Okkers 72'; Con: Len Olivier 20', 34', 58' (3/4); Jacques Schutte 79' (1/1); Pen: Riaan Smit (0/1); Len Olivier (0/1); Cards: Gavin Whittingham (yellow card) 53' to 64'; Nico Pretorius (yellow card) 67' to 74'	Scoreboard	Try: Jandré Blom 30'; Howard Noble 38'; Jaco du Toit 42'; Philip Snyman 49'; Con: Jannie Myburgh 31', 39' (2/4); Pen: Jannie Myburgh 3', 11', 22', 64' (4/6); Drop: Jannie Myburgh (0/1); Cards: Ronnie Uys (yellow card) 18' to 27'; Hendro Scholtz (yellow card) 28' to 38'; Albert Parsons (yellow card) 29' to 39'; Joel Iggo (yellow card) 70' to 79'	Attendance: 300; Referee: Tiaan Jonker

1 March 2008	Griquas	58–20	SWD Eagles	Griqua Park, Kimberley
15:00	Try: Jeremy Plaatjies 10'; Lafras Uys 25'; Sarel Pretorius 34', 62'; Chris Buckle 47'; Barry Geel 50', 56'; Tobie Botes 73'; Darryl Coeries 75'; Con: Riaan Viljoen (0/3); Tobie Botes 48', 51', 57', 63', 76' (5/6); Pen: Riaan Viljoen 6' (1/2); Drop: Tobie Botes (0/1)	Scoreboard	Try: Duwayne Smart 14'; Davon Raubenheimer 60'; Doppies le Roux 70'; Con: Nel Fourie 15' (1/3); Pen: Nel Fourie 29' (1/2)	Referee: Gareth Lloyd-Jones

1 March 2008	Leopards	25–29	Boland Cavaliers	Profert Olën Park, Potchefstroom
15:00	Try: Deon van Rensburg 6'; Jan van Zyl 16'; Jaco Bouwer 48'; Con: Anvor Schooney 7', 17' (2/3); Pen: Anvor Schooney 22', 41' (2/2)	Scoreboard	Try: Dewaldt Duvenage 37'; Dries van Schalkwyk 68'; Con: Justin Peach 38', 69' (2/2); Pen: Justin Peach 14', 19', 39', 62' (4/4); Lionel Cornelius 55' (1/1); Cards: Henley du Plessis (yellow card) 25' to 35'; Alshaun Bock (yellow card) 65' to 75'	Referee: Stuart Berry

1 March 2008	Blue Bulls	39–10	Natal Wildebeest	Loftus Versfeld, Pretoria
16:30	Try: Luvuyo Mhlobiso 21'; Okkie Kruger 26'; Rocco Jansen 32'; Francois Brummer 52'; Francois Hougaard 63'; Con: Francois Brummer 22', 33', 53', 64' (4/5); Pen: Francois Brummer 11' (1/1); Drop: Francois Brummer 1' (1/1); Cards: Juandré Kruger (yellow card) 67' to 77'	Scoreboard	Try: Nikolai Blignaut 39'; Con: Tiaan Marx 40' (1/1); Pen: Tiaan Marx 25' (1/1)	Referee: Leon van der Merwe

=== Round three ===
7 March 2008	Border Bulldogs	15–35	Golden Lions	Absa Stadium, East London
19:00	Try: Nomani Tonga 39'; Andisa Gqobo 50'; Con: Stuart Hudson 51' (1/2); Pen: Stuart Hudson 22' (1/1); Cards: Byron Schmidt (yellow card) 77'	Scoreboard	Try: Thabang Molefe 13'; Edrick van Tonder 15', 71'; Justin St Jerry 30'; Colin Lloyd 79'; Con: Arno Coetzee 14', 80' (2/4); Colin Lloyd (0/1); Pen: Arno Coetzee 47' (1/1); Drop: Arno Coetzee 56' (1/1); Cards: Altenstadt Hulme (yellow card) 21' to 31'	Attendance: 450; Referee: Jerome America

8 March 2008	SWD Eagles	24–7	Griffons	Rustdene Sports Grounds, Beaufort West
15:00	Try: Edwin du Preez 14'; Theo Bezuidenhout 37'; Doppies le Roux 54'; Con: Nel Fourie 15', 38', 55' (3/3); Pen: Nel Fourie 7' (1/1)	Scoreboard	Try: Juan de Wit 86'; Con: Johann van Niekerk 87' (1/1); Pen: Johann van Niekerk (0/1); Cards: Werner Griesel (yellow card) 17' to 27'	Attendance: 300; Referee: Mlungiseleli Mdashe

8 March 2008	Mighty Elephants	33–35	Blue Bulls	Wolfson Stadium, KwaZakele
15:30	Try: Andries Smit 47'; Michael Vermaak 53'; Ricardo van Wyk 63'; Eckard Jacobs 78'; Con: Ossie Damons 48', 54' (2/4); Pen: Ossie Damons 24', 30' (2/3); Drop: Ossie Damons 61' (1/1)	Scoreboard	Try: Okkie Kruger 18'; John Mametsa 24'; Francois Brummer 62'; Rocco Jansen 80'; Con: Francois Brummer 19', 25', 81' (3/4); Pen: Francois Brummer 3', 35', 65' (3/3); Cards: Pieter Meyer (yellow card) 29' to 40'	Referee: Mark Lawrence

8 March 2008	Free State Cheetahs	47–31	Leopards	Hoopstad Stadium, Hoopstad
15:30	Try: Philip Snyman 4', 71'; Lionel Mapoe 8', 66'; Albert Parsons 29', 45', 64'; Con: Jannie Myburgh 5', 9', 30', 65', 67', 72' (6/7); Pen: Jannie Myburgh (0/3)	Scoreboard	Try: Pellow van der Westhuizen 2'; Jaco Bouwer 13'; Riaan Swanepoel 39'; Rudi Mathee 78'; Con: Clayton Durand 3', 14', 40' (3/3); Willem Diederik Botha 79' (1/1); Pen: Clayton Durand 28' (1/1)	Attendance: 2,000; Referee: Sandile Mayende

8 March 2008	Boland Cavaliers	45–7	Pumas	Boland Stadium, Wellington
16:00	Try: Zolani Mofu 8'; Neil Papier 10'; Alshaun Bock 42', 47'; Piet van Zyl 44'; Lionel Cornelius 67'; John Daniels 76'; Con: Elgar Watts 9', 11', 43', 48', 77' (5/7); Pen: Elgar Watts (0/2)	Scoreboard	Try: Jovan Botha 4'; Con: Rudi Vogt 5' (1/1)	Referee: Petrus Bosch

8 March 2008	Western Province	54–21	Falcons	Brookside, Cape Town
16:00	Try: Dabeon Draghoender 27', 39', 46'; François van der Merwe 38', 78'; Terry Jacobs 65'; Zhahier Ryland 70'; Con: Isma-eel Dollie 39', 40', 47', 66', 71' (5/7); Pen: Isma-eel Dollie 3', 14', 16' (3/3); Cards: Morgan Newman (yellow card) 49' to 59'; Tyrone Holmes (yellow card) 67' to 77'	Scoreboard	Try: Ernie Kruger 30'; Gerrie Odendaal 51'; Luvo Sogidashe 63'; Con: Riaan Smit 31', 52', 64' (3/3); Pen: Riaan Smit (0/2)	Attendance: 600; Referee: Francois Veldsman

8 March 2008	Natal Wildebeest	23–20	Griquas	Absa Stadium, Durban
16:30	Try: Tiaan Marx 13'; Jody Jenneker 17'; Con: Tiaan Marx 14', 18' (2/2); Pen: Tiaan Marx 67' (1/4); Neil de Bruin 54', 62' (2/3); Drop: Tiaan Marx (0/1); Riaan Swanepoel (0/1)	Scoreboard	Try: Bjorn Basson 28', 58'; Con: Riaan Viljoen 29', 59' (2/2); Pen: Riaan Viljoen 16', 20' (2/4); Drop: Riaan Viljoen (0/2)	Referee: Pro Legoete

=== Round four ===
14 March 2008	Pumas	20–34	Free State Cheetahs	Puma Stadium, Witbank
19:00	Try: Jannie van der Merwe 31'; Jacques Coetzee 79'; Con: Jacques Coetzee 32', 80' (2/2); Pen: Jacques Coetzee 9', 23' (2/2)	Scoreboard	Try: Jandré Blom 15'; Bernd Theisinger 39'; Llewellyn Adonis 50'; Con: Jannie Myburgh 16', 40' (2/3); Pen: Jannie Myburgh 3', 38', 64', 67' (4/5); Drop: Jannie Myburgh 75' (1/1); Cards: Philip Snyman (yellow card) 60' to 70'; Pieter Gouws (yellow card) 77'	Attendance: 700; Referee: Pro Legoete

14 March 2008	Griffons	7–32	Natal Wildebeest	North West Stadium, Welkom
19:00	Try: Carl von Maltitz 69'; Con: Johann van Niekerk 70' (1/1); Pen: Johann van Niekerk (0/2); Drop: Johann van Niekerk (0/1)	Scoreboard	Try: Charl McLeod 5'; Lwazi Mvovo 35'; Warren Whiteley 43'; Sizwe Zondo 59'; Skholiwe Ndlovu 76'; Con: Tiaan Marx 44', 60' (2/5); Pen: Tiaan Marx (0/1); Drop: Tiaan Marx 65' (1/1)	Attendance: 850; Referee: Matt Kemp

14 March 2008	Leopards	18–28	Western Province	Profert Olën Park, Potchefstroom
19:10	Try: Anvor Schooney 27'; Deon van Rensburg 78'; Con: Clayton Durand 28' (1/2); Pen: Clayton Durand 22', 64' (2/4); Drop: Anvor Schooney (0/2); Cards: Theo van Wyk (yellow card) 2' to 12'	Scoreboard	Try: Wylie Human 57', 69'; Zhahier Ryland 75'; Con: Isma-eel Dollie 70', 76' (2/3); Pen: Morgan Newman (0/1); Isma-eel Dollie 4', 6', 19' (3/3)	Attendance: 3,000; Referee: Jason Jaftha

15 March 2008	Golden Lions	20–6	SWD Eagles	Ellis Park Stadium, Johannesburg
14:00	Try: Roland Bernard 18'; Dewald Senekal 66'; Con: Arno Coetzee 19', 67' (2/2); Pen: Arno Coetzee 40', 42' (2/2); Cards: Michael Killian (yellow card) 64' to 74'	Scoreboard	Pen: Ambrose Barends 6', 65' (2/3); Cards: Allister Kettledas (yellow card) 48' to 58'	Attendance: 3,000; Referee: Petrus Bosch

15 March 2008	Falcons	38–25	Border Bulldogs	ERU Rugby Club, Reiger Park
15:00	Try: Gerrie Odendaal 4'; Rouan Cloete 22'; Nicky Kritzinger 48', 62'; Johan Swartz 72'; Con: Jacques Schutte 5', 23', 49', 63', 73' (5/5); Pen: Jacques Schutte 44' (1/1); Cards: Warren Perkins (yellow card) 68' to 78'	Scoreboard	Try: Dumisani Meslane 14'; Andisa Gqobo 27'; Ziniko Dumaphi 76'; Con: Andisa Gqobo 15', 28' (2/3); Pen: Andisa Gqobo 30', 46' (2/2); Cards: Lonwabo Mtimka (yellow card) 60' to 70'; Nomani Tonga (yellow card) 61'	Attendance: 200; Referee: Tiaan Jonker

15 March 2008	Blue Bulls	25–18	Boland Cavaliers	Brits Sports Ground, Brits
15:00	Try: John Mametsa 9'; Con: Burton Francis 10' (1/1); Pen: Burton Francis 27', 52', 57' (3/4); Drop: Burton Francis 43', 58', 62' (3/5)	Scoreboard	Try: Franna Prinsloo 16'; Kobus Meintjes 68'; Con: Elgar Watts 17' (1/1); Lionel Cornelius (0/1); Pen: Elgar Watts 14', 44' (2/4); Cards: Coenie Basson (yellow card) 56' to 66'	Attendance: 4,000; Referee: Deon van Blommestein

15 March 2008	Griquas	55–22	Mighty Elephants	Griqua Park, Kimberley
15:30	Try: Ederich Prinsloo 4'; Regardt Dreyer 7'; Hans van Dyk 20'; Riaan Viljoen 36'; Bees Roux 44'; Frans Viljoen 58'; Darryl Coeries 78'; Con: Riaan Viljoen 5', 8', 21', 37', 45', 59' (6/6); Ederich Prinsloo 79' (1/1); Pen: Riaan Viljoen 12', 50' (2/2); Cards: Frans Viljoen (yellow card) 46' to 56'; Cilliers Coetzer (yellow card) 53' to 64'	Scoreboard	Try: Sivuyile Kobokana 29'; Ashwell Stride 63'; Petros Methula 69'; Ryan Brown 80'; Con: Deon Booysen 70' (1/4); Pen: Deon Booysen (0/1); Cards: Sebastian Hilpert (yellow card) 55' to 67'	Attendance: 250; Referee: Jerome Fortuin

=== Round five ===
28 March 2008	Border Bulldogs	13–36	Leopards	Absa Stadium, East London
19:10	Try: Brett Nel 35'; Shaun Raubenheimer 41'; Con: Andisa Gqobo (0/2); Pen: Andisa Gqobo 12' (1/1); Cards: Jovan Bowles (yellow card) 32' to 42'; Brett Nel (red card) 56'	Scoreboard	Try: Anvor Schooney 51', 59'; Deon van Rensburg 72'; Theo van Wyk 75'; Edrich Linde 78'; Con: Clayton Durand 52', 60' (2/2); Anvor Schooney 76', 79' (2/3); Pen: Clayton Durand 3' (1/1)	Attendance: 500; Referee: Jerome Fortuin

29 March 2008	Natal Wildebeest	17–10	Golden Lions	Absa Stadium, Durban
14:30	Try: penalty try 15'; Henno Mentz 26'; Tiaan Marx 28'; Con: Tiaan Marx 16' (1/2); Andries Strauss (0/1); Pen: Tiaan Marx (0/2); Drop: Tiaan Marx (0/1)	Scoreboard	Try: Edrick van Tonder 60'; Con: Arno Coetzee 61' (1/1); Pen: Arno Coetzee 49' (1/3); Drop: Arno Coetzee (0/1); Cards: Francois Uys (yellow card) 16' to 26'	Attendance: 2,000; Referee: Deon van Blommestein

29 March 2008	Boland Cavaliers	19–31	Griquas	Vredendal Sports Grounds, Vredendal
15:30	Try: Janro van Niekerk 22'; Alvin Hugo 37', 47'; Con: Justin Peach (0/1); Elgar Watts 39', 48' (2/2); Pen: Justin Peach (0/2); Cards: Zolani Mofu (yellow card) 51' to 60'	Scoreboard	Try: Sarel Pretorius 2'; Darryl Coeries 43'; Cilliers Coetzer 53'; Hans van Dyk 75'; Con: Riaan Viljoen 3', 44', 54', 76' (4/4); Pen: Riaan Viljoen 32' (1/3)	Attendance: 2,500; Referee: Matt Kemp

29 March 2008	SWD Eagles	26–27	Falcons	Uniondale
15:30	Try: Allister Kettledas 43'; Duwayne Smart 63'; Hendrik van der Nest 84'; Con: Ambrose Barends 64' (1/3); Pen: Ambrose Barends 8', 52', 57' (3/4); Cards: Wayne Bennett (yellow card) 47' to 57'	Scoreboard	Try: Ernie Kruger 29', 90'; Sean Plaatjies 33'; Reg Muller 78'; Con: Jacques Schutte 79', 91' (2/4); Pen: Jacques Schutte 47' (1/2); Cards: Albert Keuris (yellow card) 81' to 91'	Attendance: 3,200; Referee: Francois Veldsman

29 March 2008	Free State Cheetahs	22–68	Blue Bulls	Petrusburg Sports Grounds, Petrusburg
15:30	Try: Shagan Windvogel 8'; Nicky Steyn 52'; Bernd Theisinger 68'; Pieter Gouws 79'; Con: Jannie Myburgh (0/1); Bevin Fortuin 80' (1/2); Bernd Theisinger (0/1); Cards: Albert Parsons (yellow card) 28' to 38'	Scoreboard	Try: Rocco Jansen 3', 33', 60', 62'; Lukhanyo Nontshinga 11', 48'; Gerrit-Jan van Velze 21'; Brett Sharman 40'; JP Joubert 75'; Con: Burton Francis 4', 12', 22', 34', 40', 61' (6/8); Ruan Boshoff 76' (1/1); Pen: Burton Francis 65' (1/1); Drop: Tiger Mangweni 17' (1/1); Burton Francis 44' (1/1); Cards: Tiger Mangweni (yellow card) 50' to 61'	Attendance: 5,000; Referee: Lourens van der Merwe

29 March 2008	Mighty Elephants	36–12	Griffons	EPRU Stadium, Port Elizabeth
15:30	Try: Ryan Brown 15'; Michael Vermaak 20'; Ashley Viviers 22'; Ricardo van Wyk 56'; Marlon Lewis 65'; Con: Ryan Brown 21', 23', 57', 66' (4/5); Drop: Liaan Scriven 77' (1/1); Cards: Sivuyile Kobokana (yellow card) 32' to 42'	Scoreboard	Try: Shane Hancke 10'; Stevie Meyer 13'; Con: Hugo Kleynhans 14' (1/2); Pen: Hugo Kleynhans (0/1)	Attendance: 130; Referee: Silulami Pityoi

29 March 2008	Western Province	59–19	Pumas	Faure Street Stadium, Paarl
16:00	Try: Zhahier Ryland 3'; Terry Jacobs 11', 13', 57'; Paul Delport 27'; Morgan Newman 31'; Michael de Neuilly-Rice 34'; Isma-eel Dollie 38'; François van der Merwe 79'; Con: Isma-eel Dollie 4', 14', 32', 35', 39', 58' (6/8); Ricardo Croy 80' (1/1)	Scoreboard	Try: Gordon Pangetti 46'; Shaun Venter 54'; Morné Kruger 70'; Con: Jacques Coetzee 55', 71' (2/3)	Referee: Phillip Bosch

=== Round six ===
4 April 2008	Griquas	57–5	Free State Cheetahs	Griqua Park, Kimberley
19:00	Try: Darryl Coeries 20'; Chris Buckle 31'; Heinrich Stride 43'; Bjorn Basson 57', 67'; Frans Viljoen 70'; Dougie Hellmuth 76'; Wayne van Heerden 79'; Con: Riaan Viljoen 32', 44', 58', 68', 71', 77', 80' (7/8); Pen: Riaan Viljoen 10' (1/1); Cards: Frans Viljoen (yellow card) 37' to 47'; Rohan Kitshoff (yellow card) 51' to 61'	Scoreboard	Try: Ashley Johnson 11'; Con: Jannie Myburgh (0/1); Pen: Jannie Myburgh (0/1); Drop: Bevin Fortuin (0/1)	Attendance: 500; Referee: Sandile Mayende

4 April 2008	Griffons	29–53	Boland Cavaliers	North West Stadium, Welkom
19:00	Try: Cecil Afrika 27', 54'; Shane Hancke 61'; Werner Griesel 77'; Con: Johann van Niekerk 28', 62', 78' (3/4); Pen: Johann van Niekerk 26' (1/1); Drop: Johann van Niekerk (0/1); Cards: AC Vosloo (yellow card) 40' to 51'; Gys Briedenhann (yellow card) 56' to 65'	Scoreboard	Try: John Daniels 18', 36'; Dries van Schalkwyk 34'; Franna Prinsloo 44'; Piet van Zyl 52', 70'; John Burke 82'; Con: Justin Peach 19', 35', 45', 53', 71', 83' (6/7); Pen: Justin Peach 40', 48' (2/2); Cards: Piet van Zyl (yellow card) 57' to 65'	Attendance: 500; Referee: Lourens van der Merwe

4 April 2008	Pumas	53–11	Border Bulldogs	Puma Stadium, Witbank
19:10	Try: Corné Steenkamp 27'; Christiaan Els 30'; John Noble 39'; Jacques Coetzee 59', 68'; Shaun Venter 65'; Jovan Botha 73'; Con: Jacques Coetzee 28', 31', 40', 60', 66', 69' (6/7); Pen: Jacques Coetzee 13', 47' (2/5); Cards: Corné Steenkamp (yellow card) 79'	Scoreboard	Try: Lindani Gulwa 35'; Con: Stuart Hudson (0/1); Pen: Stuart Hudson 16' (1/1); Drop: Stuart Hudson 19' (1/1); Cards: Sokhana Mkona (yellow card) 72'; Nomani Tonga (yellow card) 76'; Dumisani Meslane (red card) 79'	Attendance: 400; Referee: Willie Roos

5 April 2008	Blue Bulls	35–37	Western Province	Loftus Versfeld, Pretoria
14:30	Try: Braam Gerber 11'; Rocco Jansen 14', 29'; Johan Jackson 38', 45'; Con: Burton Francis 30', 46' (2/5); Pen: Burton Francis 35', 41' (2/2); Drop: Burton Francis (0/1); Cards: Braam Gerber (yellow card) 19' to 29'; JP Joubert (yellow card) 55' to 65'; Juandré Kruger (yellow card) 60' to 70'; Brett Sharman (yellow card) 69'	Scoreboard	Try: Isma-eel Dollie 32'; PJ Vermeulen 50', 62'; Con: Isma-eel Dollie 33', 63' (2/3); Pen: Isma-eel Dollie 2', 8', 20', 24', 55', 78' (6/7); Cards: Hanyani Shimange (yellow card) 34' to 46'	Attendance: 2,447; Referee: Stuart Berry

5 April 2008	Falcons	35–28	Natal Wildebeest	Bosman Stadium, Brakpan
15:00	Try: Nicky Kritzinger 9'; Ernie Kruger 43', 79'; Morné Adams 54'; Riaan Smit 59'; Con: Jacques Schutte 10', 44', 55', 60', 80' (5/5); Pen: Jacques Schutte (0/1)	Scoreboard	Try: Luzuko Vulindlu 4'; Robbie Harris 6'; Warren Whiteley 26'; Lwazi Mvovo 40'; Con: Neil de Bruin 5', 7', 27', 41' (4/4)	Attendance: 300; Referee: Christie du Preez

5 April 2008	Leopards	46–29	SWD Eagles	Olympia Park, Rustenburg
16:00	Try: Basil de Doncker 6'; Deon van Rensburg 34', 53', 74'; Jan van Zyl 57'; Anvor Schooney 76'; Con: Clayton Durand 7', 35', 54' (3/4); Anvor Schooney 75', 77' (2/2); Pen: Clayton Durand 11', 49' (2/2); Cards: Theo van Wyk (yellow card) 74'	Scoreboard	Try: Allister Kettledas 15'; Hannes Franklin 21'; Hendrik van der Nest 62'; Izak Saayman 68'; Wayne Bennett 79'; Con: Ambrose Barends 22', 63' (2/5)	Attendance: 1,000; Referee: Gareth Lloyd-Jones

5 April 2008	Golden Lions	52–14	Mighty Elephants	Union Rugby Club, Johannesburg
16:00	Try: Francois Uys 23', 44'; Freddie van Zyl 31'; Roland Bernard 54'; Gavin Williamson 61'; Ghaliel Markus 65', 75'; Gert Muller 68'; Con: Jody Rose (0/2); Colin Lloyd 45', 55', 76' (3/6); Pen: Jody Rose 13' (1/2); Colin Lloyd 39' (1/1); Cards: Cobus Grobler (yellow card) 75'	Scoreboard	Try: Michael van Huyssteen 58'; Con: Ryan Brown (0/1); Pen: Ryan Brown 25', 34' (2/2); Drop: Marlon Lewis 10' (1/1); Cards: Christo de Jager (yellow card) 75'	Referee: Jaco Peyper

=== Round seven ===
11 April 2008	Boland Cavaliers	41–33	Golden Lions	Boland Stadium, Wellington
16:00	Try: Piet van Zyl 11'; Kobus Meintjes 17'; Whalied Heyns 19'; John Daniels 23'; Pieter Wium 41'; Alvin Hugo 71'; Con: Justin Peach 18', 20', 24', 42' (4/5); Elgar Watts (0/1); Pen: Justin Peach 16' (1/2)	Scoreboard	Try: Colin Lloyd 2'; Clinton de Klerk 34'; JJ Pienaar 46'; Gavin Williamson 64'; Edrick van Tonder 77'; Con: Colin Lloyd 47' (1/5); Pen: Colin Lloyd 39', 54' (2/2)	Referee: Sandile Mayende

11 April 2008	Free State Cheetahs	80–3	Griffons	Vodacom Park, Bloemfontein
18:00	Try: Darron Nell 10'; Bernd Theisinger 12', 36'; Jandré Blom 29', 41'; Bevin Fortuin 34'; Kabamba Floors 44', 56'; Nicky Steyn 61', 74'; Howard Noble 67'; Divan van Zyl 80'; Con: Jandré Blom 13', 30', 35', 37', 42', 45' (6/7); Bevin Fortuin 57', 62', 68' (3/3); Jaco Colyn 80' (1/1)	Scoreboard	Pen: Johann van Niekerk 23' (1/1); Cards: Shane Hancke (yellow card) 71'	Attendance: 12,500; Referee: Christie du Preez

11 April 2008	Border Bulldogs	8–50	Blue Bulls	Absa Stadium, East London
19:00	Try: Russel Jeacocks 79'; Con: Lincoln Redcliffe (0/1); Pen: Andisa Gqobo 9' (1/3); Cards: Chumani Kema (yellow card) 28'; Jovan Bowles (yellow card) 28'	Scoreboard	Try: JP Joubert 12'; Rocco Jansen 18'; Burton Francis 28'; Braam Gerber 40', 59'; Rassie Jansen van Vuuren 47'; Ruan Boshoff 73'; Carel Hoffman 75'; Con: Burton Francis 13', 19', 29' (3/6); Ruan Boshoff 74', 76' (2/2); Cards: Ruan Boshoff (yellow card) 78'	Attendance: 1,000; Referee: Matt Kemp

11 April 2008	Natal Wildebeest	32–37	Leopards	Woodburn Stadium, Pietermaritzburg
19:00	Try: Lwazi Mvovo 9'; Scott Spedding 24'; Skholiwe Ndlovu 61'; Alistair Hargreaves 79'; Con: Neil de Bruin 10', 25', 80' (3/4); Pen: Neil de Bruin 16', 48' (2/3)	Scoreboard	Try: Riaan Swanepoel 7'; Anvor Schooney 19'; Deon van Rensburg 43'; Rudi Mathee 55'; Jan van Zyl 64'; Con: Clayton Durand 8', 44', 56' (3/5); Pen: Clayton Durand 12', 58' (2/2); Cards: Anthonie Gronum (yellow card) 76'	Attendance: 1,000; Referee: Deon van Blommestein

12 April 2008	Western Province	23–23	Griquas	Newlands Stadium, Cape Town
12:30	Try: Isma-eel Dollie 26'; Dabeon Draghoender 74'; Con: Isma-eel Dollie 27' (1/1); Ricardo Croy 75' (1/1); Pen: Isma-eel Dollie 11', 17', 25' (3/3); Cards: Pieter Myburgh (yellow card) 65' to 75'; David Hendricks (yellow card) 79'	Scoreboard	Try: Frans Viljoen 5'; Chris Buckle 35'; Con: Riaan Viljoen 6', 36' (2/2); Pen: Riaan Viljoen 16', 43', 52' (3/4); Drop: Riaan Viljoen (0/1); Tobie Botes (0/1)	Attendance: 5,000; Referee: Jaco Peyper

12 April 2008	SWD Eagles	50–12	Pumas	Outeniqua Park, George
15:00	Try: Doppies le Roux 5'; Duwayne Smart 9', 21'; Mark Esterhuizen 39'; Valentine van Wyk 45'; Edwin du Preez 53'; Ambrose Barends 64'; Hannes Franklin 79'; Con: Ambrose Barends 6', 10', 22', 65', 80' (5/8); Cards: Edwin du Preez (yellow card) 70' to 80'; Wayne Bennett (yellow card) 84'	Scoreboard	Try: Jacques Coetzee 3'; Gordon Pangetti 74'; Con: Jacques Coetzee 4' (1/2); Cards: André du Toit (yellow card) 78'	Attendance: 100; Referee: Joey Salmans

12 April 2008	Mighty Elephants	38–36	Falcons	EPRU Stadium, Port Elizabeth
15:30	Try: Shaun Nel 16'; Marlon Lewis 50'; Noel de Villiers 52'; Elroy Ligman 56'; Deon Booysen 66'; Con: Ryan Brown 17', 51', 53', 57', 67' (5/5); Pen: Ryan Brown 24' (1/2); Cards: Petros Methula (red card) 81'	Scoreboard	Try: Ernie Kruger 3', 26'; Reg Muller 37'; Nicky Kritzinger 61'; Sean Plaatjies 78'; Luvo Sogidashe 80'; Con: Jacques Schutte 4' (1/4); Len Olivier 79', 81' (2/2)	Attendance: 140; Referee: Gareth Lloyd-Jones

=== Quarter-finals ===
25 April 2008	Free State Cheetahs	35–20	Boland Cavaliers	Vodacom Park, Bloemfontein
17:00	Try: Wilton Pietersen 9', 79'; Howard Noble 12'; Jaco du Toit 17'; Giscard Pieters 30'; Con: Jannie Myburgh 13', 18' (2/4); Jandré Blom (0/1); Pen: Jandré Blom 49', 66' (2/3); Drop: Bernd Theisinger (0/1)	Scoreboard	Try: Piet van Zyl 24'; John Burke 57'; Con: Justin Peach 25', 58' (2/2); Pen: Justin Peach 37', 46' (2/2)	Attendance: 1,200; Referee: Pro Legoete

25 April 2008	Blue Bulls	51–7	Golden Lions	Loftus Versfeld, Pretoria
18:00	Try: Braam Gerber 1'; Rocco Jansen 13', 44'; John Mametsa 17', 67'; Ruan Boshoff 24'; Okkie Kruger 37'; Con: Burton Francis 2', 18', 25', 38', 45' (5/7); Pen: Burton Francis 8', 55' (2/4); Drop: Burton Francis (0/2); Cards: Brett Sharman (yellow card) 30' to 40'	Scoreboard	Try: Gert-Andries van der Merwe 32'; Con: André Smith 33' (1/1)	Attendance: 1,373; Referee: Jaco Peyper

26 April 2008	Griquas	37–30	Leopards	Griqua Park, Kimberley
12:10	Try: Stephan Gerber 8'; Frans Viljoen 31'; Barry Geel 35', 38'; Brendon Snyman 67'; Con: Riaan Viljoen 9', 36' (2/4); Tobie Botes 68' (1/1); Pen: Riaan Viljoen 25', 48' (2/2)	Scoreboard	Try: Anvor Schooney 16'; Jan van Zyl 42', 44', 59'; Con: Clayton Durand 17', 45' (2/3); Anvor Schooney (0/1); Pen: Clayton Durand 40', 50' (2/4)	Attendance: 1,000; Referee: Petrus Bosch

26 April 2008	Western Province	22–14	Natal Wildebeest	Newlands Stadium, Cape Town
15:00	Try: Isma-eel Dollie 1', 44'; Deon Fourie 71'; Con: Isma-eel Dollie 45', 72' (2/3); Pen: Isma-eel Dollie 37' (1/4); Drop: Isma-eel Dollie (0/1); Cards: Alastair Siegelaar (yellow card) 54' to 65'; Wicus Blaauw (yellow card) 54' to 65'	Scoreboard	Try: Jody Jenneker 19'; Michael Rhodes 59'; Con: Neil de Bruin 20', 60' (2/2); Pen: Neil de Bruin (0/2); Cards: Schalk van Jaarsveld (yellow card) 69' to 79'	Referee: Francois Veldsman

=== Semi-finals ===
3 May 2008	Blue Bulls	40–20	Griquas	Loftus Versfeld, Pretoria
12:15	Try: Braam Gerber 6'; Rassie Jansen van Vuuren 52'; Tiger Mangweni 65', 68'; Con: Burton Francis 7', 53', 65', 69' (4/4); Pen: Burton Francis 35', 78' (2/3); Drop: Burton Francis 48', 59' (2/5); Ruan Boshoff (0/1); Cards: Braam Gerber (yellow card) 66' to 76'; Hilton Lobberts (yellow card) 75'	Scoreboard	Try: Lafras Uys 39'; Riaan Viljoen 75'; Con: Riaan Viljoen 40', 76' (2/2); Pen: Riaan Viljoen 44', 57' (2/3); Tobie Botes (0/1); Drop: Riaan Viljoen (0/1); Cards: Frans Viljoen (yellow card) 35' to 45'; Rohan Kitshoff (yellow card) 59' to 69'	Referee: Francois Veldsman

3 May 2008	Western Province	22–27	Free State Cheetahs	Newlands Stadium, Cape Town
14:00	Try: Morgan Newman 36'; Paul Delport 56'; Nico du Plessis 66'; Con: Isma-eel Dollie 37' (1/2); Ricardo Croy 67' (1/1); Pen: Isma-eel Dollie 60' (1/1); Drop: Isma-eel Dollie (0/1); Cards: Morgan Newman (yellow card) 75'	Scoreboard	Try: Giscard Pieters 25'; Sias Ebersohn 72'; Ronnie Uys 76'; Con: Jandré Blom 26' (1/1); Sias Ebersohn 73', 77' (2/2); Pen: Jandré Blom 50', 53' (2/4); Sias Ebersohn (0/1); Drop: Wilton Pietersen (0/1); Sias Ebersohn (0/1); Cards: Flip van der Merwe (yellow card) 26' to 37'	Referee: Sandile Mayende

=== Final ===
16 May 2008	Blue Bulls	25–21	Free State Cheetahs	Loftus Versfeld, Pretoria
19:10	Try: Rocco Jansen 48'; Con: Burton Francis 49' (1/1); Pen: Burton Francis 6', 12', 45', 56', 61', 77' (6/6); Drop: Burton Francis (0/1); JP Joubert (0/1); Cards: Frik Kirsten (yellow card) 68' to 78'; JP Joubert (yellow card) 83'	Scoreboard	Try: Wilton Pietersen 32'; Philip Snyman 71'; Con: Jandré Blom 33' (1/2); Pen: Jandré Blom 40', 53', 69' (3/4); Drop: Sias Ebersohn (0/1); Jandré Blom (0/1); Cards: Philip Lemmer (yellow card) 60' to 70'	Attendance: 7,670; Referee: Francois Veldsman

== Winners ==
2008 Vodacom Cup
CHAMPIONS
Blue Bulls
Second Title

== Players ==
=== Player statistics ===
The following table contain points which were scored during the 2008 Vodacom Cup season.

Top point scorers
No	Player	Team	T	C	P	DG	Pts
1	Isma-eel Dollie	Western Province	5	20	20	0	125
2	Burton Francis	Blue Bulls	1	22	16	6	115
3	Riaan Viljoen	Griquas	2	26	15	0	107
4	Rocco Jansen	Blue Bulls	14	0	0	0	70
5	Jannie Myburgh	Free State Cheetahs	0	16	11	1	68
5	Justin Peach	Boland Cavaliers	0	16	12	0	68
7	Anvor Schooney	Leopards	8	8	3	0	65
8	Jacques Coetzee	Pumas	5	12	4	0	61
9	Clayton Durand	Leopards	0	14	10	0	58
10	Jandré Blom	Free State Cheetahs	4	8	7	0	57
11	Arno Coetzee	Golden Lions	1	7	10	1	52
12	Francois Brummer	Blue Bulls	2	7	5	1	42
13	Ryan Brown	Mighty Elephants	2	9	3	0	37
13	Rudi Vogt	Pumas	1	10	4	0	37
15	Ambrose Barends	SWD Eagles	1	8	5	0	36
16	Terry Jacobs	Western Province	7	0	0	0	35
16	Ernie Kruger	Falcons	7	0	0	0	35
16	Deon van Rensburg	Leopards	7	0	0	0	35
19	Jacques Schutte	Falcons	0	14	2	0	34
20	Nel Fourie	SWD Eagles	0	7	6	0	32
21	Johann van Niekerk	Griffons	0	10	4	0	32
22	Tiaan Marx	Natal Wildebeest	2	6	2	1	31
23	Ossie Damons	Mighty Elephants	1	2	6	1	30
23	Neil de Bruin	Natal Wildebeest	0	9	4	0	30
23	Jan van Zyl	Leopards	6	0	0	0	30
26	Morgan Newman	Western Province	3	4	2	0	29
27	Colin Lloyd	Golden Lions	2	4	3	0	27
28	Andisa Gqobo	Border Bulldogs	2	2	4	0	26
29	Bjorn Basson	Griquas	5	0	0	0	25
29	Braam Gerber	Blue Bulls	5	0	0	0	25
29	Piet van Zyl	Boland Cavaliers	5	0	0	0	25
29	Elgar Watts	Boland Cavaliers	0	8	2	1	25
33	Stuart Hudson	Border Bulldogs	0	3	4	1	21
34	Ruan Boshoff	Blue Bulls	2	5	0	0	20
34	Darryl Coeries	Griquas	4	0	0	0	20
34	John Daniels	Boland Cavaliers	4	0	0	0	20
34	Dabeon Draghoender	Western Province	4	0	0	0	20
34	Barry Geel	Griquas	4	0	0	0	20
34	Nicky Kritzinger	Falcons	4	0	0	0	20
34	Okkie Kruger	Blue Bulls	4	0	0	0	20
34	John Mametsa	Blue Bulls	4	0	0	0	20
34	Gordon Pangetti	Pumas	4	0	0	0	20
34	Duwayne Smart	SWD Eagles	4	0	0	0	20
34	Philip Snyman	Free State Cheetahs	4	0	0	0	20
34	Nicky Steyn	Free State Cheetahs	4	0	0	0	20
34	Bernd Theisinger	Free State Cheetahs	4	0	0	0	20
34	Edrick van Tonder	Golden Lions	4	0	0	0	20
34	Frans Viljoen	Griquas	4	0	0	0	20
49	Marlon Lewis	Mighty Elephants	3	0	0	1	18
50	Tobie Botes	Griquas	1	6	0	0	17
51	Alshaun Bock	Boland Cavaliers	3	0	0	0	15
51	Chris Buckle	Griquas	3	0	0	0	15
51	Jaco du Toit	Free State Cheetahs	3	0	0	0	15
51	Shane Hancke	Griffons	3	0	0	0	15
51	Alvin Hugo	Boland Cavaliers	3	0	0	0	15
51	Allister Kettledas	SWD Eagles	3	0	0	0	15
51	Doppies le Roux	SWD Eagles	3	0	0	0	15
51	Kobus Meintjes	Boland Cavaliers	3	0	0	0	15
51	Lwazi Mvovo	Natal Wildebeest	3	0	0	0	15
51	Howard Noble	Free State Cheetahs	3	0	0	0	15
51	Len Olivier	Falcons	1	5	0	0	15
51	Albert Parsons	Free State Cheetahs	3	0	0	0	15
51	Wilton Pietersen	Free State Cheetahs	3	0	0	0	15
51	Sarel Pretorius	Griquas	3	0	0	0	15
51	Zhahier Ryland	Western Province	3	0	0	0	15
51	Luvo Sogidashe	Falcons	3	0	0	0	15
51	Riaan Swanepoel	Leopards	3	0	0	0	15
51	Francois Uys	Golden Lions	3	0	0	0	15
51	François van der Merwe	Western Province	3	0	0	0	15
51	Hendrik van der Nest	SWD Eagles	3	0	0	0	15
51	Shaun Venter	Pumas	3	0	0	0	15
51	PJ Vermeulen	Western Province	3	0	0	0	15
73	Bevin Fortuin	Free State Cheetahs	1	4	0	0	13
73	Tiger Mangweni	Blue Bulls	2	0	0	1	13
75	Cecil Afrika	Griffons	2	1	0	0	12
76	Deon Booysen	Mighty Elephants	1	3	0	0	11
76	Riaan Smit	Falcons	1	3	0	0	11
78	Wium Arlow	Falcons	2	0	0	0	10
78	Roland Bernard	Golden Lions	2	0	0	0	10
78	Jovan Botha	Pumas	2	0	0	0	10
78	Jaco Bouwer	Leopards	2	0	0	0	10
78	Boetie Britz	Western Province	2	0	0	0	10
78	John Burke	Boland Cavaliers	2	0	0	0	10
78	Rouan Cloete	Falcons	2	0	0	0	10
78	Clinton de Klerk	Golden Lions	2	0	0	0	10
78	Paul Delport	Western Province	2	0	0	0	10
78	Juan de Wit	Griffons	2	0	0	0	10
78	Ziniko Dumaphi	Border Bulldogs	2	0	0	0	10
78	Edwin du Preez	SWD Eagles	2	0	0	0	10
78	Kabamba Floors	Free State Cheetahs	2	0	0	0	10
78	Hannes Franklin	SWD Eagles	2	0	0	0	10
78	Werner Griesel	Griffons	2	0	0	0	10
78	Dougie Hellmuth	Griquas	2	0	0	0	10
78	Wylie Human	Western Province	2	0	0	0	10
78	Johan Jackson	Blue Bulls	2	0	0	0	10
78	Rassie Jansen van Vuuren	Blue Bulls	2	0	0	0	10
78	Jody Jenneker	Natal Wildebeest	2	0	0	0	10
78	Ashley Johnson	Free State Cheetahs	2	0	0	0	10
78	JP Joubert	Blue Bulls	2	0	0	0	10
78	Morné Kruger	Pumas	2	0	0	0	10
78	Lionel Mapoe	Free State Cheetahs	2	0	0	0	10
78	Ghaliel Markus	Golden Lions	2	0	0	0	10
78	Rudi Mathee	Leopards	2	0	0	0	10
78	Zolani Mofu	Boland Cavaliers	2	0	0	0	10
78	Reg Muller	Falcons	2	0	0	0	10
78	Skholiwe Ndlovu	Natal Wildebeest	2	0	0	0	10
78	Lukhanyo Nontshinga	Blue Bulls	2	0	0	0	10
78	Gerrie Odendaal	Falcons	2	0	0	0	10
78	Dean Okkers	Falcons	2	0	0	0	10
78	Giscard Pieters	Free State Cheetahs	2	0	0	0	10
78	Sean Plaatjies	Falcons	2	0	0	0	10
78	Franna Prinsloo	Boland Cavaliers	2	0	0	0	10
78	Justin St Jerry	Golden Lions	2	0	0	0	10
78	Corné Steenkamp	Pumas	2	0	0	0	10
78	Lafras Uys	Griquas	2	0	0	0	10
78	Pellow van der Westhuizen	Leopards	2	0	0	0	10
78	Hans van Dyk	Griquas	2	0	0	0	10
78	Dries van Schalkwyk	Boland Cavaliers	2	0	0	0	10
78	Ricardo van Wyk	Mighty Elephants	2	0	0	0	10
78	Michael Vermaak	Mighty Elephants	2	0	0	0	10
78	Warren Whiteley	Natal Wildebeest	2	0	0	0	10
78	Gavin Williamson	Golden Lions	2	0	0	0	10
123	Sias Ebersohn	Free State Cheetahs	1	2	0	0	9
124	Lionel Cornelius	Boland Cavaliers	1	0	1	0	8
124	Scott Spedding	Natal Wildebeest	1	0	1	0	8
126	Russel Jeacocks	Border Bulldogs	1	1	0	0	7
126	Ederich Prinsloo	Griquas	1	1	0	0	7
126	Andries Strauss	Natal Wildebeest	1	1	0	0	7
126	Poerie van Rooyen	Falcons	0	2	1	0	7
130	Ricardo Croy	Western Province	0	3	0	0	6
131	Morné Adams	Falcons	1	0	0	0	5
131	Llewellyn Adonis	Free State Cheetahs	1	0	0	0	5
131	Wayne Bennett	SWD Eagles	1	0	0	0	5
131	Theo Bezuidenhout	SWD Eagles	1	0	0	0	5
131	Nikolai Blignaut	Natal Wildebeest	1	0	0	0	5
131	Gys Briedenhann	Griffons	1	0	0	0	5
131	Warren Bowles	Border Bulldogs	1	0	0	0	5
131	Cilliers Coetzer	Griquas	1	0	0	0	5
131	Ashton Constant	Pumas	1	0	0	0	5
131	Basil de Doncker	Leopards	1	0	0	0	5
131	Michael de Neuilly-Rice	Western Province	1	0	0	0	5
131	Noel de Villiers	Mighty Elephants	1	0	0	0	5
131	Stephan Dippenaar	Blue Bulls	1	0	0	0	5
131	Regardt Dreyer	Griquas	1	0	0	0	5
131	Nico du Plessis	Western Province	1	0	0	0	5
131	Dewaldt Duvenage	Boland Cavaliers	1	0	0	0	5
131	Christiaan Els	Pumas	1	0	0	0	5
131	Mark Esterhuizen	SWD Eagles	1	0	0	0	5
131	Deon Fourie	Western Province	1	0	0	0	5
131	Stephan Gerber	Griquas	1	0	0	0	5
131	Pieter Gouws	Free State Cheetahs	1	0	0	0	5
131	Henry Grimes	SWD Eagles	1	0	0	0	5
131	Lindani Gulwa	Border Bulldogs	1	0	0	0	5
131	Alistair Hargreaves	Natal Wildebeest	1	0	0	0	5
131	Robbie Harris	Natal Wildebeest	1	0	0	0	5
131	David Hendricks	Western Province	1	0	0	0	5
131	Whalied Heyns	Boland Cavaliers	1	0	0	0	5
131	Carel Hoffman	Blue Bulls	1	0	0	0	5
131	Francois Hougaard	Blue Bulls	1	0	0	0	5
131	Eckard Jacobs	Mighty Elephants	1	0	0	0	5
131	Sivuyile Kobokana	Mighty Elephants	1	0	0	0	5
131	Andries Kruger	Border Bulldogs	1	0	0	0	5
131	Elroy Ligman	Mighty Elephants	1	0	0	0	5
131	Edrich Linde	Leopards	1	0	0	0	5
131	Sasha Marot	Pumas	1	0	0	0	5
131	Charl McLeod	Natal Wildebeest	1	0	0	0	5
131	Henno Mentz	Natal Wildebeest	1	0	0	0	5
131	Dumisani Meslane	Border Bulldogs	1	0	0	0	5
131	Petros Methula	Mighty Elephants	1	0	0	0	5
131	Gerhardus Lourens Meyer	Golden Lions	1	0	0	0	5
131	Stevie Meyer	Griffons	1	0	0	0	5
131	Luvuyo Mhlobiso	Blue Bulls	1	0	0	0	5
131	Quintin Minnaar	Pumas	1	0	0	0	5
131	Thabang Molefe	Golden Lions	1	0	0	0	5
131	Gert Muller	Golden Lions	1	0	0	0	5
131	Brett Nel	Border Bulldogs	1	0	0	0	5
131	Shaun Nel	Mighty Elephants	1	0	0	0	5
131	Darron Nell	Free State Cheetahs	1	0	0	0	5
131	John Noble	Pumas	1	0	0	0	5
131	Jongi Nokwe	Free State Cheetahs	1	0	0	0	5
131	Neil Papier	Boland Cavaliers	1	0	0	0	5
131	Warren Perkins	Falcons	1	0	0	0	5
131	Gideon Pienaar	Griffons	1	0	0	0	5
131	JJ Pienaar	Golden Lions	1	0	0	0	5
131	Jeremy Plaatjies	Griquas	1	0	0	0	5
131	Herman Pretorius	Free State Cheetahs	1	0	0	0	5
131	Nicolaas Pretorius	Griffons	1	0	0	0	5
131	Davon Raubenheimer	SWD Eagles	1	0	0	0	5
131	Shaun Raubenheimer	Border Bulldogs	1	0	0	0	5
131	Michael Rhodes	Natal Wildebeest	1	0	0	0	5
131	Bees Roux	Griquas	1	0	0	0	5
131	Izak Saayman	SWD Eagles	1	0	0	0	5
131	Dewald Senekal	Golden Lions	1	0	0	0	5
131	Brett Sharman	Blue Bulls	1	0	0	0	5
131	Andries Smit	Mighty Elephants	1	0	0	0	5
131	Brendon Snyman	Griquas	1	0	0	0	5
131	Dawie Steyn	Pumas	1	0	0	0	5
131	Ashwell Stride	Mighty Elephants	1	0	0	0	5
131	Heinrich Stride	Griquas	1	0	0	0	5
131	André Swanepoel	Leopards	1	0	0	0	5
131	Johan Swartz	Falcons	1	0	0	0	5
131	Nomani Tonga	Border Bulldogs	1	0	0	0	5
131	Solly Tyibilika	Border Bulldogs	1	0	0	0	5
131	Ronnie Uys	Free State Cheetahs	1	0	0	0	5
131	Gert-Andries van der Merwe	Golden Lions	1	0	0	0	5
131	Jannie van der Merwe	Pumas	1	0	0	0	5
131	Wayne van Heerden	Griquas	1	0	0	0	5
131	Michael van Huyssteen	Mighty Elephants	1	0	0	0	5
131	Janro van Niekerk	Boland Cavaliers	1	0	0	0	5
131	Gerrit-Jan van Velze	Blue Bulls	1	0	0	0	5
—	penalty try	Natal Wildebeest	1	0	0	0	5
* Legend: T = Tries, C = Conversions, P = Penalties, DG = Drop Goals, Pts = Points.

== See also ==
- Vodacom Cup
- 2008 Currie Cup Premier Division
- 2008 Currie Cup First Division
