= 2008 IRB Nations Cup =

Tournament details
- Countries: South Africa A Georgia; Italy A Romania; Russia; Uruguay
- Tournament format(s): Modified Round-robin
- Date: 11 – 20 June 2008

Tournament statistics
- Teams: 6
- Matches played: 9
- Attendance: 0 (0 per match)
- Tries scored: 25 (2.78 per match)
- Top point scorer(s): Matias Arocena (Uruguay) (34 points)
- Top try scorer(s): Florin Corodeanu (Romania); Dato Gasviani (Georgia); Howard Noble (Emerging Springboks) (2 tries)

Final
- Champions: South Africa A (2nd title)
- Runners-up: Georgia

The 2008 IRB Nations Cup was the third edition of the international rugby union tournament, a competition created by the International Rugby Board. It pits the "A" Teams of the stronger (Tier 1) rugby nations (Emerging Springboks and Italy A) against some of the Tier 2 and 3 nations (Romania, Georgia, Russia and Uruguay).

For the second consecutive year the event was held in Bucharest, Romania. The Emerging Springboks were the overall winners for their second consecutive year.

The competition format was a modified round-robin whereby each team played 3 of the other 5 teams. The competition was played over three match days, with three matches played consecutively on each day.

== Final standings ==
2008 IRB Nations Cup
	Team	Played	Won	Drawn	Lost	Points For	Points Against	Points Difference	Tries For	Tries Against	Try Bonus	Losing Bonus	Points
1	South Africa A	3	3	0	0	56	35	21	6	2	0	0	12
2	Georgia	3	2	0	1	48	32	16	5	1	0	0	8
3	Romania	3	2	0	1	36	43	−7	3	3	0	0	8
4	Italy A	3	1	0	2	60	60	0	6	7	1	1	6
5	Uruguay	3	1	0	2	47	49	−2	2	4	0	2	6
6	Russia	3	0	0	3	46	74	−28	3	8	0	2	2
Source : irb.com Points breakdown: *4 points for a win *2 points for a draw *1 bonus point for a loss by seven points or less *1 bonus point for scoring four or more tries in a match

== Results ==
=== Round 1 ===
11 June 2008
16:00 EET (UTC+02)

Italy A	38–15	Russia
Try: Pietrosanti 10' m Galante 20' c Sepe 42' m Derbyshire 63' c Giovanchelli 74' m Con: Buso (2/5); Pen: Buso (3/3) 14', 30', 47'	Report; Stats	Try: Marchenko 26' m Khrokin 60' c Con: Yanyushkin (1/2); Pen: Yanyushkin (1/1) 70'

Stadionul Arcul de Triumf, Bucharest
Referee: Radu Petrescu (Romania)

11 June 2008
18:00 EET (UTC+02)

South Africa A	11–3	Georgia
Try: Noble 49' m Pen: Dollie (2/2) 27', 46'	Report; Stats	Pen: Barkalaia (1/1) 37'

Stadionul Arcul de Triumf, Bucharest
Referee: Alan Falzone (Italy)

11 June 2008
20:00 EET (UTC+02)

Uruguay	6–10	Romania
Pen: Arocena (1/1) 47'; Caffera (1/1) 76'	Report; Stats	Try: Corodeanu 3' c Con: Vlaicu (1/1); Pen: Vlaicu (1/1) 17'

Stadionul Arcul de Triumf, Bucharest
Referee: Pro Legoete (South Africa)

=== Round 2 ===
15 June 2008
16:00 EET (UTC+02)

Georgia	20–18	Uruguay
Try: Nemsadze 7' c Gasviani 44' c Con: Malaguradze (2/2); Pen: Malaguradze (2/2) 55', 56'	Report; Stats	Pen: Arocena (6/6) 21', 29', 39', 50', 58', 59'

Stadionul Arcul de Triumf, Bucharest
Referee: Radu Petrescu (Romania)

15 June 2008
18:00 EET (UTC+02)

Italy A	19–20	South Africa A
Try: Sbaraglini 78' c Con: Duca (1/1); Pen: Buso (4/4) 42', 47', 54', 63'	Report; Stats	Try: Waka 30' c Jansen 50' c Con: Dollie (2/2); Pen: Dollie (2/2) 2', 64'

Stadionul Arcul de Triumf, Bucharest
Referee: Jérôme Garces (France)

15 June 2008
20:00 EET (UTC+02)

Russia	12–13	Romania
Pen: Yanyushkin (4/4) 5', 36', 49', 57'	Report; Stats	Try: Tasca 68' c Con: Dumbravă (1/1); Pen: Dumbravă (2/2) 9', 40'

Stadionul Arcul de Triumf, Bucharest
Referee: Alan Falzone (Italy)

=== Round 3 ===
20 June 2008
16:00 EET (UTC+02)

Russia	19–23	Uruguay
Try: Volkov 37' c Con: Yanyushkin (1/1); Pen: Yanyushkin (3/3) 39', 60', 70'; Drop: Kuzmenko (1/1) 55'	Report; Stats	Try: Penalty try 75' c Conti 80' c Con: Arocena (2/2); Pen: Arocena (3/3)

Stadionul Arcul de Triumf, Bucharest
Referee: Radu Petrescu (Romania)

20 June 2008
18:00 EET (UTC+02)

Italy A	3–25	Georgia
Pen: Duca (1/1) 20'	Report; Stats	Try: Gasviani 1' m Gundishvili 40' c Tsiklauri 78' c Con: Malaguradze (1/2); Uchava (1/1); Pen: Malaguradze (2/2) 13', 63'

Stadionul Arcul de Triumf, Bucharest
Referee: Pro Legoete (South Africa)

20 June 2008
20:00 EET (UTC+02)

South Africa A	25–13	Romania
Try: Basson 27' c Noble 51' c Jenneker 77' m Con: Newman (2/3); Pen: Newman (2/2) 22', 38'	Report; Stats	Try: Corodeanu 26' c Con: Dimofte (1/1); Pen: Dumbravă (1/1) 2'; Dimofte (1/1) 33'

Stadionul Arcul de Triumf, Bucharest
Referee: Alan Falzone (Italy)

== Top scorers ==
=== Top points scorers ===
Rank	Player	Team	Points
1	Matias Arocena	Uruguay	34
2	Alexander Yanyushkin	Russia	28
3	Paolo Buso	Italy A	25
4	Lasha Malaguradze	Georgia	18
5	Isma-eel Dollie	South Africa A	16
6	Dănuț Dumbravă	Romania	11
7	Florin Corodeanu	Romania	10
7	Dato Gasviani	Georgia	10
7	Morgan Newman	South Africa A	10
7	Howard Noble	South Africa A	10

Source: irb.com

=== Top try scorers ===
Rank	Player	Team	Tries
1	Florin Corodeanu	Romania	2
1	Dato Gasviani	Georgia	2
1	Howard Noble	South Africa A	2
4	18 players, 1 Penalty try		1

Source: irb.com

== See also ==
- 2008 IRB Pacific Nations Cup
