= Nicky Steyn =

South African rugby union player

- Full name: Nicolaas Phillipus Jacobus Steyn
- Born: 2 August 1985 (age 41) Kroonstad, South Africa
- Height: 1.90 m (6 ft 3 in)
- Weight: 107 kg (16 st 12 lb; 236 lb)
- School: Welkom Gymnasium
- University: University of the Free State / Central University of Technology

Rugby union career
- Position: No 8 / Flanker
Youth career
- 2003–2005: Griffons
- 2004: Sharks
- 2006: Free State Cheetahs
Senior career
Years	Team	Apps	(Points)
2006–2008	Free State Cheetahs	19	(60)
2008–2015	Griffons	121	(280)
- Correct as of 5 September 2015
International career
Years	Team	Apps	(Points)
2012	South African Barbarians (North)	1	(0)
- Correct as of 19 June 2013

Nicolaas Phillipus Jacobus Steyn (born 2 August 1985 in Kroonstad) is a former South African rugby union player that made 140 first class appearances for the Griffons and the Free State Cheetahs between 2006 and 2015. He usually played as an Eighth man.

== Career ==
=== Youth ===
He represented the Griffons at the 2003 Under-18 Craven Week and in the Under-20 and Under-21 Currie Cup competitions in 2004 and 2005. In 2006, he joined the Free State Cheetahs and represented them at Under-21 level.

=== Free State Cheetahs ===
He was included in the Free State Cheetahs squad for the 2006 Vodacom Cup tournament and made his debut against the Leopards. He made a total of eighteen appearances in the Vodacom Cup competition in 2006, 2007 and 2008, but failed to break into the Currie Cup side.

=== Griffons ===
He returned to the Griffons for the 2008 Currie Cup First Division competition and established himself a regular, making 121 appearances for the side over the next eight seasons, scoring 55 tries.

He was a key member of their 2014 Currie Cup First Division-winning side. He captained the side in the final and helped the Griffons win the match 23–21 to win their first trophy for six years.

He retired from professional during the 2015 Currie Cup First Division season to accept a job offer as a quantity surveyor in Doha, Qatar. He left the Griffons as their all-time top try scorer with 56 tries, and in their top ten for all-time appearances.

=== Representative rugby ===
In 2012, he was selected for the South African Barbarians (North) team against England that toured South Africa as part of the 2012 mid-year rugby test series.
