= Bjorn Basson =

South African rugby union player (born 1987)

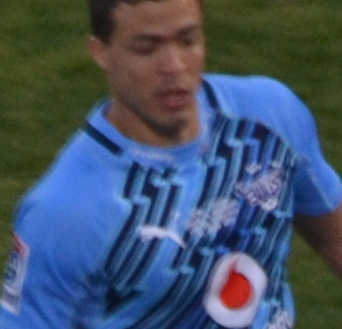
- Basson playing for the Vodacom Bulls during a match against the Brumbies on July 27, 2013
- Full name: Bjorn Alberic Basson
- Born: 11 February 1987 (age 39) King William's Town, South Africa
- Height: 1.85 m (6 ft 1 in)
- Weight: 87 kg (13 st 10 lb; 192 lb)
- School: Dale College
- Notable relative(s): Logan Basson (brother), Cody Basson (brother)

Rugby union career
- Position(s): Wing, Full-back
- Current team: San Diego Legion / Griquas
Youth career
- 2005–2006: Border Bulldogs
- 2007: Griquas
Senior career
Years	Team	Apps	(Points)
2008–2010	Griquas	56	(235)
2009–2010	Cheetahs	9	(30)
2011–2016	Bulls	86	(145)
2011–2016	Blue Bulls	26	(105)
2015–2016	Honda Heat	6	(10)
2016	Blue Bulls XV	1	(0)
2017	Stormers	6	(15)
2017	Western Province	6	(20)
2017–2018	Oyonnax	6	(10)
2018–2019	Southern Kings	17	(40)
2019–	Griquas	4	(0)
2019–2020	Enisei-STM	6	(15)
2021–	San Diego Legion	0	(0)
- Correct as of 3 March 2021
International career
Years	Team	Apps	(Points)
2008–2009	Emerging Springboks	4	(5)
2009	Highveld XV	1	(0)
2010–2013	South Africa	11	(15)
- Correct as of 18 April 2018

Bjorn Alberic Basson (born 11 February 1987) is a South African professional rugby union player playing as a wing or full-back for the San Diego Legion of Major League Rugby (MLR).

He previously played for Enisei-STM in the European Rugby Challenge Cup.

== Professional career ==
=== Griquas and Cheetahs ===
After playing for the Border U19 side in 2005 and 2006, he then moved to Kimberley to join Griquas. He made his debut in the 2008 Vodacom Cup competition, starting the match against former side Border Bulldogs in East London and scoring a try to help Griquas to a 15–5 win. He played in eight matches, scoring five tries. His first-ever Currie Cup season in 2008 saw him score a further six tries in eleven matches.

As a Griquas player, he could also play Super Rugby for the Cheetahs. He was included in the Cheetahs in the 2009 Super 14 season, scoring one try in five appearances. He also scored one try in his three appearances for Griquas in the 2009 Vodacom Cup. He started twelve matches for Griquas in the 2009 Currie Cup Premier Division, as well as one substitute appearance and scored six tries to once again feature in the top ten try scorers list.

2010 was Basson's most prolific season of all. He scored five tries in just four starts for the Cheetahs in the 2010 Super 14 season, six tries in his seven matches in the 2010 Vodacom Cup for Griquas, finishing joint third overall try scorer in the competition. and two tries in a compulsory friendly match against SWD Eagles prior to the 2010 Currie Cup Premier Division season.

He then broke the record for the most number of tries scored in a single Currie Cup season, scoring no less than 21 for Griquas in the 2010 Currie Cup Premier Division.

=== Bulls ===
Basson signed a two-year contract with the Blue Bulls Company on 19 September 2010. He later extended his contract, signing on until October 2016.

In 2011, Basson was the joint top try scorer in the 2011 Super Rugby season with eleven tries for the Bulls, along with Sean Maitland and Sarel Pretorius.

=== Oyonnax ===
Basson joined French Top 14 side Oyonnax in December 2017, signing as a medical joker for the injured Matt Hopper.

=== Southern Kings ===
Basson returned to South Africa in 2018 to join the Southern Kings ahead of the 2018–19 Pro14.

== National team ==
=== Emerging Springboks ===
In 2008, Basson was chosen to represent the Emerging Springboks team, which went on to win the 2008 IRB Nations Cup in Romania.

During the 2009 British & Irish Lions tour to South Africa, he twice played against the Lions; once for the Royal XV and again for the Emerging Springboks.

=== South African national team ===
Basson was selected for the Springboks tour of the United Kingdom and Ireland in 2010. He made his test debut on 5 June 2010 against Wales in Cardiff.

On 15 November 2010 he and Chiliboy Ralepelle were suspended and sent home from the Northern Hemisphere tour after testing positive for a banned substance after the game against Ireland on 6 November 2010. Both players tested positive for methylhexaneamine, a "non-specified stimulant" on the prohibited substances list of WADA.

Basson played in two tests during the 2012 mid-year series for the Springboks: their 36–27 win over England and their 14–14 draw with England.

== Honours ==
- 2010 – Award: Absa Currie Cup Premier Division Player of the Year
