= Davon Raubenheimer =

South African rugby union player (born 1984)

- Full name: Davon Stephanus Raubenheimer
- Born: 16 July 1984 (age 42) Knysna, South Africa
- Height: 1.95 m (6 ft 5 in)
- Weight: 115 kg (18 st 2 lb; 254 lb)
- School: Knysna Sec School; Pacaltsdorp Sec
- Notable relative: Shaun Raubenheimer (cousin)

Rugby union career
- Position: Flank / Number Eight
Youth career
- 2003–2005: SWD Eagles
Senior career
Years	Team	Apps	(Points)
2005–2008	SWD Eagles	60	(25)
2009–2011	Griquas	56	(20)
2010–2012	Cheetahs	20	(10)
2012–2013	Free State XV	6	(0)
2012–2013	Free State Cheetahs	16	(0)
2013	→ Griffons	5	(0)
2014–2018	SWD Eagles	53	(0)
- Correct as of 13 July 2018
International career
Years	Team	Apps	(Points)
2005	South Africa Under-21	3	(0)
2008	Emerging Springboks	2	(0)
2009	Royal XV	1	(0)
2009	South Africa (tour)	2	(0)
- Correct as of 21 October 2013

Davon Stephanus Raubenheimer (born 16 July 1984 in Knysna, South Africa) is a former professional rugby union rugby player. His regular playing position is flanker.

== Career ==
Raubenheimer hails from the Western Cape and began his senior career with his local team, the SWD Eagles. He made 60 appearances for the Eagles before heading north to join the Griquas. During his time in Kimberley, he was called up to the Cheetahs Super Rugby side and made his debut during the 2010 Super 14 season. He switched to the Free State Cheetahs for domestic competitions in 2012 and is a regular in the province's Vodacom Cup side.

== International ==
Raubenheimer was a member of the South Africa Under 21 side that won the 2005 Under 21 Rugby World Championship in Argentina and also the Emerging Springboks team that won the 2008 IRB Nations Cup in Romania. He was called up by the Springboks for their 2009 end-of-year tour of France, Italy, Ireland and England. He did not earn any full international caps on the tour, but he did play in 2 midweek tour matches.

== Honours ==
- Western Coastal Region U18 Craven Week - 2002
- 2003 – SWD Eagles Under 20
- 2004 – SWD Eagles Under 20
- 2005 – SWD Eagles Vodacom and Currie Cup
- 2005 – South Africa Under-21 Under 21 Rugby World Championship
- 2006 – SWD Eagles Vodacom Cup
- 2006 – Southern Spears
- 2007 – SWD Eagles Vodacom and Currie Cup
- 2008 – SWD Eagles Vodacom and Currie Cup
- 2008 – Emerging Springboks IRB Nations Cup in Romania
- 2009 – Griquas Vodacom and Currie Cup
- 2009 – Highveld XV 2009 British & Irish Lions tour to South Africa
- 2009 – South Africa 2009 end-of-year rugby union tests
- 2010 – Griquas Vodacom and Currie Cup
- 2010 – Cheetahs Super Rugby
- 2011 – Griquas Vodacom and Currie Cup
- 2011 – Cheetahs Super Rugby
- 2012 – Free State Cheetahs Vodacom and Currie Cup
- 2012 – Cheetahs Super Rugby
- 2013 – Free State Cheetahs Vodacom and Currie Cup
- 2013 – Cheetahs Super Rugby
- 2013 – Griffons (loan) Currie Cup
