= Piet van Zyl =

Piet van Zyl may refer to:

- Piet van Zyl (rugby union, born 1989), South African international rugby union player
- Piet van Zyl (rugby union, born 1979), South African-born Namibian international rugby union player
