= 2007 Vodacom Cup =

- Champions: Griquas
- Matches played: 49

The 2007 Vodacom Cup was the 10th edition of this annual domestic cup competition. The Vodacom Cup is played between provincial rugby union teams in South Africa from the Currie Cup Premier and First Divisions.

== Competition ==
There were 14 teams participating in the 2007 Vodacom Cup competition. These teams were geographically divided into two sections - the Northern Section and the Southern Section, each with seven teams. Teams would play all the other teams in their section once over the course of the season, either at home or away.

Teams received four points for a win and two points for a draw. Bonus points were awarded to teams that score four or more tries in a game, as well as to teams losing a match by seven points or less. Teams were ranked by points, then points difference (points scored less points conceded).

The top four teams in each section qualified for the play-offs. In the quarter-finals, the teams that finished first in each section had home advantage against the teams that finished fourth in the other section and the teams that finished second in each section had home advantage against the teams that finished third in the other section. The winners of these quarter finals then played each other in the semi-finals, with the higher placed team having home advantage. The two semi-final winners then met in the final.

== Teams ==
Location of teams in 2007 Vodacom Cup
Northern Section
Southern Section

=== Changes from 2006 ===
- The single pool was scrapped and all teams were geographically divided into two sections.

=== Team Listing ===
The following teams took part in the 2007 Vodacom Cup competition:

Northern Section
| Team | Stadium/s |
| Falcons | Bosman Stadium, Brakpan |
| Falcons | John Vorster Stadium, Nigel |
| Golden Lions | Ellis Park Stadium, Johannesburg |
| Golden Lions | Rand Leases Sports Ground, Roodepoort |
| Golden Lions | Wits Rugby Stadium, Johannesburg |
| Griffons | North West Stadium, Welkom |
| Leopards | Santam Olën Park, Potchefstroom |
| Leopards | Fanie du Toit Sport Ground, Potchefstroom |
| Pumas | Witbank Mica Stadium, Witbank |
| Blue Bulls | Loftus Versfeld, Pretoria |
| Blue Bulls | LC de Villiers Stadium, Pretoria |
| Blue Bulls | Eersterust |
| Griquas | Griqua Park, Kimberley |
| Griquas | Jumbo Harris Stadium, Beeshoek |

Southern Section
| Team | Stadium/s |
| Boland Cavaliers | Boland Stadium, Wellington |
| Boland Cavaliers | King Edward Stadium, Montagu |
| Border Bulldogs | Absa Stadium, East London |
| Mighty Elephants | EPRU Stadium, Port Elizabeth |
| Mighty Elephants | Mickey Yili Stadium, Grahamstown |
| Free State Cheetahs | Vodacom Park, Bloemfontein |
| Free State Cheetahs | Seisa Ramabodu Stadium, Botshabelo |
| Natal Wildebeest | Absa Stadium, Durban |
| Natal Wildebeest | Woodburn Stadium, Pietermaritzburg |
| SWD Eagles | Outeniqua Park, George |
| SWD Eagles | Riverville Stadium, Riversdale |
| Western Province | Newlands Stadium, Cape Town |
| Western Province | Florida Park, Parow |

== Tables ==
=== Northern Section ===
2007 Vodacom Cup Northern Section Table
| | Team | Played | Won | Drawn | Lost | Points For | Points Against | Points Difference | Tries For | Tries Against | Try Bonus | Losing Bonus | Points |
| 1 | Griquas | 6 | 5 | 0 | 1 | 200 | 99 | +101 | 24 | 13 | 3 | 1 | 24 |
| 2 | Blue Bulls | 6 | 5 | 0 | 1 | 184 | 104 | +80 | 24 | 13 | 3 | 0 | 23 |
| 3 | Pumas | 6 | 3 | 0 | 3 | 172 | 141 | +31 | 24 | 15 | 3 | 1 | 16 |
| 4 | Leopards | 6 | 3 | 0 | 3 | 159 | 144 | +15 | 20 | 19 | 3 | 1 | 16 |
| 5 | Falcons | 6 | 3 | 0 | 3 | 137 | 134 | +3 | 18 | 14 | 1 | 2 | 15 |
| 6 | Golden Lions | 6 | 2 | 0 | 4 | 137 | 234 | -97 | 19 | 31 | 3 | 0 | 11 |
| 7 | Griffons | 6 | 0 | 0 | 6 | 104 | 237 | -133 | 11 | 35 | 0 | 2 | 2 |
The top 4 teams qualified for the quarter-finals. Points breakdown: *4 points for a win *2 points for a draw *1 bonus point for a loss by seven points or less *1 bonus point for scoring four or more tries in a match

=== Southern Section ===
2007 Vodacom Cup Southern Section Table
| | Team | Played | Won | Drawn | Lost | Points For | Points Against | Points Difference | Tries For | Tries Against | Try Bonus | Losing Bonus | Points |
| 1 | Western Province | 6 | 6 | 0 | 0 | 214 | 100 | +114 | 28 | 13 | 4 | 0 | 28 |
| 2 | Free State Cheetahs | 6 | 3 | 0 | 3 | 166 | 132 | +34 | 21 | 15 | 3 | 2 | 17 |
| 3 | Boland Cavaliers | 6 | 3 | 0 | 3 | 178 | 155 | +23 | 22 | 20 | 3 | 1 | 16 |
| 4 | Mighty Elephants | 6 | 3 | 0 | 3 | 157 | 174 | -17 | 20 | 23 | 3 | 1 | 16 |
| 5 | Natal Wildebeest | 6 | 3 | 0 | 3 | 142 | 129 | +13 | 18 | 13 | 1 | 1 | 14 |
| 6 | SWD Eagles | 6 | 2 | 0 | 4 | 135 | 165 | -30 | 18 | 22 | 1 | 1 | 10 |
| 7 | Border Bulldogs | 6 | 1 | 0 | 5 | 93 | 230 | -137 | 10 | 31 | 0 | 0 | 4 |
The top 4 teams qualified for the quarter-finals. Points breakdown: *4 points for a win *2 points for a draw *1 bonus point for a loss by seven points or less *1 bonus point for scoring four or more tries in a match

== Results ==
=== Northern Section ===
==== Round one ====
2007-02-23

| Griffons | 13 - 17 | Falcons |
| | Scoreboard |

North West Stadium, Welkom

2007-02-23

| Griquas | 31 - 21 | Leopards |
| | Scoreboard |

Griqua Park, Kimberley

2007-02-24

| Pumas | 38 - 10 | Golden Lions |
| | Scoreboard |

Witbank Mica Stadium, Witbank

==== Round two ====
2007-03-02

| Blue Bulls | 56 - 15 | Griffons |
| Try: Braam Gerber, Deon Stegmann, Dewald Potgieter, Dries Scholtz, Neil Powell, Tsepo Christian Kokoali (2); Con: Jacques-Louis Potgieter (5); Pen: Jacques-Louis Potgieter (2) | Scoreboard | Try: Japie Nel, Martinus Christoffel Zwiegelaar; Con: Jannie Myburgh; Pen: Jannie Myburgh |

Loftus Versfeld, Pretoria
Attendance: 1051

2007-03-03

| Leopards | 38 - 21 | Pumas |
| | Scoreboard |

Fanie du Toit Sport Ground, Potchefstroom

2007-03-03

| Falcons | 24 - 19 | Griquas |
| | Scoreboard |

John Vorster Stadium, Nigel

==== Round three ====
2007-03-09

| Griquas | 20 - 3 | Blue Bulls |
| Try: MJ Mentz (2); Con: Conrad Barnard (2); Pen: Conrad Barnard (2) | Scoreboard | Pen: Jacques-Louis Potgieter |

Griqua Park, Kimberley
Attendance: 1500

2007-03-10

| Pumas | 29 - 23 | Falcons |
| | Scoreboard |

Witbank Mica Stadium, Witbank

2007-03-10

| Golden Lions | 27 - 25 | Leopards |
| | Scoreboard |

Rand Leases Sports Ground, Roodepoort

==== Round four ====
2007-03-16

| Griffons | 19 - 54 | Griquas |
| | Scoreboard |

North West Stadium, Welkom

2007-03-16

| Falcons | 40 - 30 | Golden Lions |
| | Scoreboard |

Bosman Stadium, Brakpan

2007-03-17

| Blue Bulls | 25 - 24 | Pumas |
| Try: Dewald Potgieter, John Mametsa, Wilhelm Steenkamp; Con: Jacques-Louis Potgieter (2); Pen: Jacques-Louis Potgieter (2) | Scoreboard | Try: Barend du Plessis, Hyron Thyse, Jacques Lombaard; Pen: Adnaan Osman (3) |

LC de Villiers Stadium, Pretoria
Attendance: 1500

==== Round Five ====
2007-03-23

| Pumas | 43 - 16 | Griffons |
| | Scoreboard |

Witbank Mica Stadium, Witbank

2007-03-24

| Leopards | 26 - 25 | Falcons |
| | Scoreboard |

Santam Olën Park, Potchefstroom

2007-03-24

| Golden Lions | 17 - 51 | Blue Bulls |
| Try: Charl McLeod, Derick Minnie; Con: Clinton de Klerk (2); Pen: Clinton de Klerk | Scoreboard | Try: Dewald Pretorius (2), Gerhard Human, Hendrik Roodt, John Mametsa, Lukhanyo Nontshinga, Rocco Jansen; Con: Jacques-Louis Potgieter (5); Pen: Jacques-Louis Potgieter, Ruan Jopie Boshoff |

Ellis Park Stadium, Johannesburg
Attendance: 6000

==== Round Six ====
2007-03-30

| Blue Bulls | 32 - 20 | Leopards |
| Try: Emile Verster, Lukhanyo Nontshinga, Nic Eyre, Werner Kruger; Con: Jacques-Louis Potgieter (3); Pen: Jacques-Louis Potgieter; Drop: Jacques-Louis Potgieter | Scoreboard | Try: Deon van Rensburg, Freddie van Zyl, Wicus Blaauw; Con: Corné Meyer; Pen: Corné Meyer |

Eersterust

2007-03-31

| Griffons | 33 - 38 | Golden Lions |
| | Scoreboard |

North West Stadium, Welkom

2007-03-31

| Griquas | 29 - 17 | Pumas |
| | Scoreboard |

Jumbo Harris Stadium, Beeshoek

==== Round Seven ====
2007-04-13

| Falcons | 8 - 17 | Blue Bulls |
| Try: Dean Okkers; Pen: Leonard Olivier | Scoreboard | Try: Anton Leonard, Rocco Jansen; Con: Jacques-Louis Potgieter (2); Pen: Jacques-Louis Potgieter |

Bosman Stadium, Brakpan
Attendance: 350

2007-04-14

| Golden Lions | 15 - 47 | Griquas |
| | Scoreboard |

Wits Rugby Stadium, Johannesburg

2007-04-14

| Leopards | 29 - 8 | Griffons |
| | Scoreboard |

Fanie du Toit Sport Ground, Potchefstroom

=== Southern Section ===
==== Round one ====
2007-02-23

| Natal Wildebeest | 24 - 16 | Boland Cavaliers |
| | Scoreboard |

Absa Stadium, Durban

2007-02-23

| Border Bulldogs | 15 - 23 | Free State Cheetahs |
| | Scoreboard |

Absa Stadium, East London

2007-02-24

| Mighty Elephants | 44 - 24 | SWD Eagles |
| | Scoreboard |

Mickey Yili Stadium, Grahamstown

==== Round two ====
2007-03-02

| Free State Cheetahs | 47 - 8 | Mighty Elephants |
| | Scoreboard |

Vodacom Park, Bloemfontein

2007-03-03

| SWD Eagles | 25 - 16 | Natal Wildebeest |
| | Scoreboard |

Outeniqua Park, George

2007-03-03

| Western Province | 51 - 21 | Border Bulldogs |
| | Scoreboard |

Newlands Stadium, Cape Town

==== Round three ====
2007-03-09

| Natal Wildebeest | 24 - 21 | Free State Cheetahs |
| | Scoreboard |

Woodburn Stadium, Pietermaritzburg

2007-03-09

| Mighty Elephants | 5 - 46 | Western Province |
| | Scoreboard |

EPRU Stadium, Port Elizabeth

2007-03-10

| Boland Cavaliers | 36 - 17 | SWD Eagles |
| | Scoreboard |

King Edward Stadium, Montagu

==== Round four ====
2007-03-16

| Border Bulldogs | 31 - 25 | Mighty Elephants |
| | Scoreboard |

Absa Stadium, East London

2007-03-17

| Free State Cheetahs | 27 - 36 | Boland Cavaliers |
| | Scoreboard |

Vodacom Park, Bloemfontein

2007-03-17

| Western Province | 19 - 13 | Natal Wildebeest |
| | Scoreboard |

Florida Park, Parow

==== Round Five ====
2007-03-24

| Natal Wildebeest | 65 - 3 | Border Bulldogs |
| | Scoreboard |

Absa Stadium, Durban

2007-03-24

| SWD Eagles | 24 - 30 | Free State Cheetahs |
| | Scoreboard |

Riverville Stadium, Riversdale

2007-03-24

| Boland Cavaliers | 24 - 37 | Western Province |
| | Scoreboard |

Boland Stadium, Wellington

==== Round Six ====
2007-03-30

| Border Bulldogs | 20 - 40 | Boland Cavaliers |
| | Scoreboard |

Absa Stadium, East London

2007-03-31

| Mighty Elephants | 45 - 0 | Natal Wildebeest |
| | Scoreboard |

EPRU Stadium, Port Elizabeth

2007-03-31

| Western Province | 36 - 19 | SWD Eagles |
| | Scoreboard |

Newlands Stadium, Cape Town

==== Round Seven ====
2007-04-13

| SWD Eagles | 26 - 3 | Border Bulldogs |
| | Scoreboard |

Outeniqua Park, George

2007-04-14

| Free State Cheetahs | 18 - 25 | Western Province |
| | Scoreboard |

Seisa Ramabodu Stadium, Botshabelo

2007-04-14

| Boland Cavaliers | 26 - 30 | Mighty Elephants |
| | Scoreboard |

Boland Stadium, Wellington

=== Quarter-finals ===
2007-04-20

| Free State Cheetahs | 30 - 33 | Pumas |
| | Scoreboard |

Vodacom Park, Bloemfontein

2007-04-20

| Blue Bulls | 43 - 27 | Boland Cavaliers |
| Try: Dries Scholtz, Lukhanyo Nontshinga, Marius Delport, Nic Eyre, Wilhelm Steenkamp; Con: Jacques-Louis Potgieter (3); Pen: Jacques-Louis Potgieter (3); Drop: Jacques-Louis Potgieter | Scoreboard | Try: Pieter Barend Wium, Rennie Dazel (2); Con: Jacques Schutte (3); Pen: Jacques Schutte (2) |

Loftus Versfeld, Pretoria

2007-04-21

| Western Province | 14 - 30 | Leopards |
| | Scoreboard |

Newlands Stadium, Cape Town

2007-04-21

| Griquas | 53 - 19 | Mighty Elephants |
| | Scoreboard |

Griqua Park, Kimberley

=== Semi-finals ===
2007-04-27

| Blue Bulls | 32 - 25 | Leopards |
| Try: Bandise Maku, Frikkie Welsh, Jacques-Louis Potgieter, Wilhelm Steenkamp; Con: Jacques-Louis Potgieter (3); Pen: Jacques-Louis Potgieter (2) | Scoreboard | Try: Morné Basson, Ronnie Uys (2); Con: Corné Meyer (2); Pen: Corné Meyer (2) |

Loftus Versfeld, Pretoria
Attendance: 1000

2007-04-28

| Griquas | 46 - 26 | Pumas |
| | Scoreboard |

Griqua Park, Kimberley

=== Final ===
2007-05-04

| Griquas | 33 - 29 | Blue Bulls |
| Try: Dean Hopp, Heinrich Stride, MJ Mentz, Zane Kirchner; Con: Conrad Barnard (2); Pen: Conrad Barnard (3) | Scoreboard | Try: Ruan Jopie Boshoff, Dries Scholtz, Lukhanyo Nontshinga; Con: Jacques-Louis Potgieter (2); Pen: Jacques-Louis Potgieter (3); Drop: Jacques-Louis Potgieter |

Griqua Park, Kimberley
Attendance: 5000

== Winners ==
2007
Vodacom Cup
CHAMPIONS
Griquas
3rd title
