= Regardt Dreyer =

South African rugby player (born 1982)

- Born: Regardt Dreyer; 10 December 1982 (age 43) Westville, KwaZulu-Natal, South Africa
- Height: 1.90 m (6 ft 3 in)
- Weight: 118 kg (18 st 8 lb)

Rugby union career
- Position: Prop
Senior career
Years	Team	Apps	(Points)
2008–	Northampton Saints	5	(0)
- Correct as of 4 November 2009
Provincial / State sides
Years	Team	Apps	(Points)
2003–07	Leopards		
2007–09	Griquas	17	(12)
- Correct as of 10 June 2008
Super Rugby
Years	Team	Apps	(Points)
2007–08	Cheetahs		

Regardt Dreyer (born 10 December 1982, Johannesburg) is a professional South African Rugby footballer currently playing for Aviva Premiership side Northampton Saints. His preferred position is at Prop.

== Career ==
Dreyer signed for Northampton Saints along with Juandré Kruger, another fellow South African Rugby player on 6 October 2008 but did not officially join until after his Currie Cup commitments. Although he did not play for the saints in his first season, he played for their reserves team (the Wanderers) helping them winning the Guinness A League. He made his first start the following season.
