= Michael Vermaak =

South African rugby union player

- Born: 10 October 1979 (age 47) Uitenhage, South Africa
- Height: 1.89 m (6 ft 2 1/2 in)
- Weight: 108 kg (17 st 0 lb; 238 lb)
- School: Hoërskool Brandwag
- University: Free State Technikon

Rugby union career
- Position: Number Eight
- Current team: Despatch
Amateur team(s)
Years	Team	Apps	(Points)
2011, 2014–present	Despatch	12	(15)
Senior career
Years	Team	Apps	(Points)
2002–2004	Free State Cheetahs	6	(5)
2001, 2005–2006, 2008–2009	Mighty Elephants	45	(25)
2006–2007	Falcons	28	(15)
2012–present	SWD Eagles	26	(10)
- Correct as of 7 April 2015
International career
Years	Team	Apps	(Points)
2009	Southern Kings	0	(0)
- Correct as of 11 April 2013

Michael Vermaak (born 10 October 1979) is a South African rugby union player, currently playing with Eastern Province Grand Challenge club side Despatch.. His regular position is number eight.

== Career ==
He started his career playing in 2001 for his local provincial team the Mighty Elephants in 2001. In 2002, he joined the Free State Cheetahs to play in the South African Cup and Vodacom Cup competitions, but failed to progress to the Currie Cup side.

He rejoined Mighty Elephants in 2005 where he became a regular in the team. The following season, he moved to the Falcons, who were playing in the Currie Cup Premier Division at the time and also became a regular starter for them.

He rejoined the Mighty Elephants at the start of the 2008 Vodacom Cup season for a third time, captaining the side on several occasions over the next two seasons. However, he then suffered a series of injuries and missed the entire 2010 season. In 2011, he joined local club team Despatch. His form for them earned him a contract at the SWD Eagles for the 2012 Vodacom Cup season.

He was also included in the Southern Kings training squad to play against the British & Irish Lions during their 2009 tour, but he failed to make the final 22-man squad.
