= Rudi Mathee =

South African rugby union player

- Born: 25 February 1986 (age 40) Port Elizabeth, South Africa
- Height: 1.95 m (6 ft 5 in)
- Weight: 108 kg (17 st 0 lb; 238 lb)
- School: Otto du Plessis High School

Rugby union career
- Position: Lock
Senior career
Years	Team	Apps	(Points)
2007	Golden Lions	6	(5)
2008–2009	Leopards	26	(30)
2010	Free State Cheetahs	6	(10)
2010	→ Griffons	6	(10)
2011–2016	Pumas	67	(60)
2014	Lions	5	(0)
- Correct as of 9 October 2015
International career
Years	Team	Apps	(Points)
2007	South Africa Students	1	(5)
2009	Highveld XV	1	(0)
2012	South African Barbarians (North)	1	(0)
- Correct as of 31 May 2015

Rudi Mathee (born 25 February 1986) is a South African former rugby union footballer that played mainly as a lock. He most recently represented the Pumas in the Currie Cup and Vodacom Cup having previously played for the Golden Lions, Leopards, Cheetahs and Griffons.

He was a member of the Pumas side that won the Vodacom Cup for the first time in 2015, beating Western Province 24–7 in the final. Mathee made nine appearances during the season, scoring three tries.

He retired in 2016 on medical advice after suffering a back injury.
