= Bees Roux =

South African rugby union player

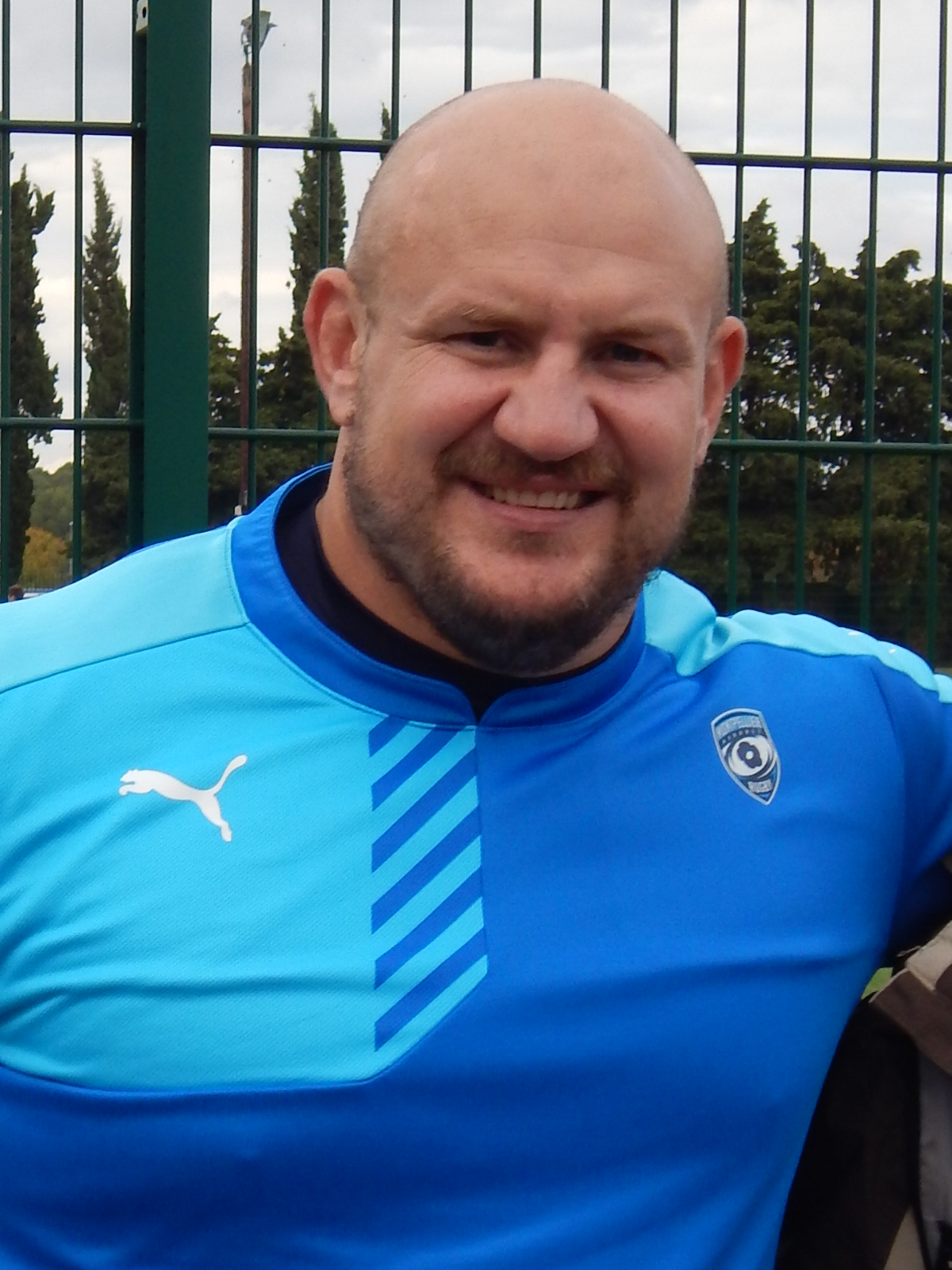
- Full name: Jacobus Stephanus Roux
- Born: 9 December 1981 (age 44) Upington, South Africa
- Height: 1.86 m (6 ft 1 in)
- Weight: 115 kg (18 st 2 lb; 254 lb)
- School: Marlow Agricultural School, Cradock
- University: North-West University

Rugby union career
- Position: Prop
- Current team: Montpellier
Youth career
- 1997–2000: Eastern Province
- 2001: Falcons
- 2002: Leopards
Senior career
Years	Team	Apps	(Points)
2005–2006	Leopards	41	(5)
2007–2009	Griquas	31	(5)
2008–2009	Cheetahs	17	(0)
2008–2009	→ Clermont	8	(0)
2010	Bulls	14	(0)
2010	Blue Bulls	7	(0)
2011–2012	Bordeaux Bègles	13	(0)
2012–2013	Benetton Treviso	13	(0)
2013–2014	Golden Lions	3	(0)
2014	Free State Cheetahs	1	(0)
2015–present	Oyonnax	1	(0)
2015–present	Montpellier	3	(0)
- Correct as of 27 October 2015
International career
Years	Team	Apps	(Points)
2009	Highveld XV	1	(0)
- Correct as of 18 May 2014

Jacobus Stephanus "Bees" Roux (born 9 December 1981 in Upington) is a South African rugby union player, currently playing with Montpellier. His regular position is prop.

== Career ==
He started his playing career at the Leopards and represented them in the Vodacom Cup and Currie Cup competitions in 2005 and 2006, making over 40 appearances.

In 2007, he joined Kimberley-based side Griquas, where he played his rugby over the next three seasons. During his spell at Griquas, he also played Super Rugby for the Cheetahs, making seventeen appearances for them in the 2008 and 2009 seasons. He also spent the off-season at the end of 2008 playing some rugby for French Top 14 side Clermont, appearing in both the Top 14 and Heineken Cup competitions.

He joined the Blue Bulls in 2010, making eight appearances for them, as well as fourteen appearances for the Bulls in the 2010 Super 14 season.

== Homicide conviction and further career ==
In August 2010, Roux assaulted police officer Sergeant Ntshimane Johannes Mogale, killing him. He was charged with murder, but in a plea bargain agreement, was convicted of culpable homicide and given a five-year prison sentence in September 2011, suspended on the condition that he paid R750 000 to the widow of the police officer.

He continued his career in France, joining Bordeaux Bègles for the 2011–12 Top 14 season and then playing for Italian side Benetton Treviso in the 2012–13 Pro 12 competition.

He returned to South Africa in 2013 and joined the Golden Lions for the 2013 Currie Cup Premier Division and he was named in their starting line-up for their match against the Free State Cheetahs.

However, he failed to feature regularly for the Johannesburg-based side and joined the Free State Cheetahs for the 2014 Currie Cup Premier Division.

=== Representative rugby ===
He also played for a Highveld XV team against the British & Irish Lions during their tour to South Africa, starting the match and scoring a try.
