= Nomani Tonga =

Tongan rugby union player

- Full name: Nomani Tonga
- Born: 16 May 1983 (age 43) Neiafu, Tonga
- Height: 1.93 m (6 ft 4 in)
- Weight: 120 kg (18 st 13 lb; 265 lb)
- School: Vava'u High School
- University: University of the South Pacific; Tonga College Atele

Rugby union career
- Position: Lock / Flanker
- Current team: Border Bulldogs
Senior career
Years	Team	Apps	(Points)
2000–2004	Falaleu Marist		
2005–2006	Hull		
2008–2013	Border Bulldogs	70	(25)
2013-2014	CA Lormont	9	(0)
2014–2018	SC Albi	82	(5)
2018-present	Stade Rodez Aveyron		
- Correct as of 30 September 2013

Nomani Tonga (born 16 May 1983 in Neiafu) is a Tongan rugby union player, currently playing with the Border Bulldogs in South Africa. His regular position is lock or flanker.

== Career ==
He started his career at local club Falaleu Marist Rugby Club, where he played between 2000 and 2004. He joined Hull in 2005, where he played for one season.

In 2008, he joined South African team Border Bulldogs, where he made his debut for them in the 2008 Vodacom Cup and has played in excess of 60 matches for them.
