= Brett Sharman =

South African rugby union player

- Born: Brett Sharman; 18 January 1987 (age 39) Westville, KwaZulu-Natal, South Africa
- Height: 1.85 m (6 ft 1 in)
- Weight: 106 kg (16 st 10 lb)
- School: Pretoria Boys High School
- University: University of South Africa, University of Northumbria
- Occupation: Professional rugby player

Rugby union career
- Position: Hooker
- Current team: Retired
Amateur team(s)
Years	Team	Apps	(Points)
- University of Pretoria
Senior career
Years	Team	Apps	(Points)
2005–2008	Blue Bulls	22	(40)
2009–2012	Northampton Saints	67	(30)
2012	Bath Rugby	15	(15)
2014–15	Saracens	15	(15)
- Correct as of 15 February 2015

Brett Sharman (born 18 January 1987) is a professional South African rugby footballer. His preferred position was at hooker.

== Early life ==
Sharman was born in Westville, Durban in 1987. He moved to Johannesburg where he attended Bryanston Primary School in Bryanston. He later attended Pretoria Boys High School in Pretoria South Africa and graduated in 2005 as First team captain and a school prefect. Brett received a Certificate in Sports Management through the University of Pretoria in 2006. In 2008 he went on to do a BCom in Transport and Logistics through the University of South Africa. After joining up with the Saints, Sharman managed to do a BA (Hons) in Business management and Leadership through the University of Northumbria and graduated in July 2013.

== Career ==
Sharman started his career at the Blue Bulls, where he came through the youth ranks and eventually made a breakthrough into the first team. He was a regular starter from the 2007 season onwards, playing a part in the final of the Vodacom Cup which the Blue Bulls won.

In December 2008, Sharman joined Northampton Saints, following Juandré Kruger who had joined the Saints from the Bulls a few months earlier.

Although he was born in South Africa he is a qualified British citizen and holds a British passport. He has expressed a desire to play for England rugby team in the future.

Sharman deputised for Dylan Hartley from 2008-9 to 2011-12. He was capped 67 times for the Saints, scoring two tries. In January 2012, Brett suffered a career changing knee injury, which required substantial surgery on his MCL and had a patellar reconstruction.

Sharman joined Bath Rugby in September 2012 on a short-term contract after being released from Northampton Saints following his long term knee injury and ongoing issues with the club due to racist Twitter posts regarding Olympic runner Mo Farah. Sharman won his first cap for Bath in the Amlin challenge cup against the Bucharest Wolves where he went to make 15 appearances for Bath. On 4 November 2014, he signed for Saracens until the end of the 2014–15 season.

Sharman is retired from rugby and living and working in South Africa.
