= Deon van Rensburg =

South African rugby union player

- Full name: Andries Gideon van Rensburg
- Born: 24 January 1982 (age 44) Potchefstroom, South Africa
- Height: 1.75 m (5 ft 9 in)
- Weight: 94 kg (14 st 11 lb; 207 lb)
- School: Potchefstroom HTS

Rugby union career
- Position: Winger / Centre
Youth career
- 2002: Leopards
Senior career
Years	Team	Apps	(Points)
2004–2009	Leopards	44	(95)
2009–2014	Lions	55	(20)
2010–2013	Golden Lions	34	(75)
2004–2014	Total	133	(190)
- Correct as of 25 November 2014
International career
Years	Team	Apps	(Points)
2009	Emerging Springboks	1	(0)
2009	Royal XV	1	(0)
- Correct as of 25 November 2014

Gideon Andries van Rensburg (born 24 January 1982) is a former South African rugby union footballer. His regular playing position was winger or centre.

Between 2004 and 2009, he played for Potchefstroom side the Leopards, making 44 appearances and scoring 19 tries. In 2009, while still a Leopards player, he also earned a call-up to the Lions side during the 2009 Super 14 season and joined the Golden Lions prior to the 2010 Currie Cup Premier Division season. He eventually scored 19 tries in 44 appearances for the Leopards and 15 tries in 34 appearances for the Golden Lions, as well as four tries in 55 Super Rugby matches. He also played in two matches during the 2009 British & Irish Lions tour to South Africa, one for a Highveld XV side in Potchefstroom and one for an Emerging Springboks side in Cape Town.

A persistent leg injury led to Van Rensburg missing the 2014 Currie Cup Premier Division season and eventually his retirement at the end of the 2014 season.
