= Pellow van der Westhuizen =

South African rugby union player

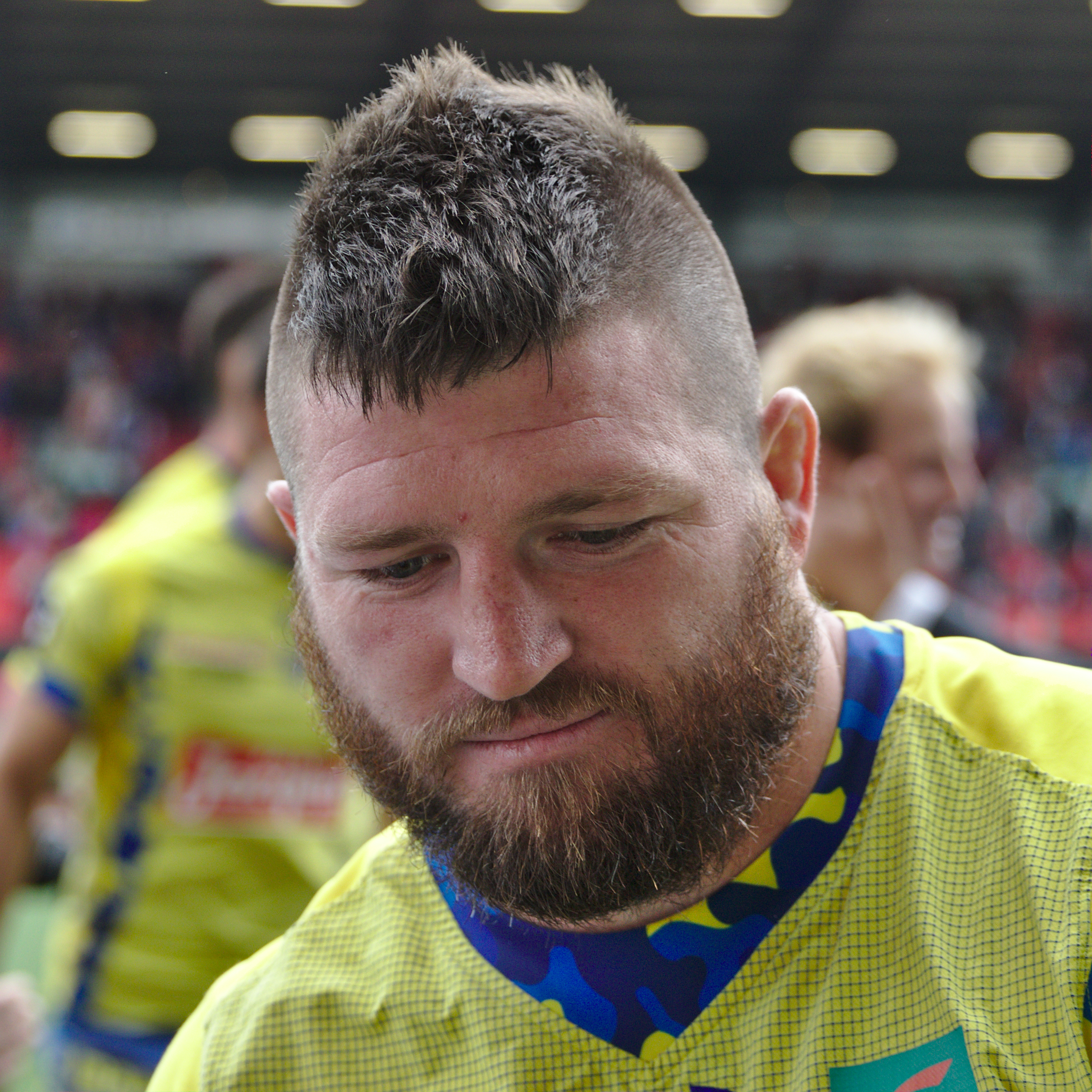
- Full name: Marthinus Riaan Stefanus van der Westhuizen
- Born: 3 February 1984 (age 42) Uitenhage, South Africa
- Height: 1.79 m (5 ft 10 1/2 in)
- Weight: 103 kg (16 st 3 lb; 227 lb)
- School: HTS Middleburg
- University: NWU Pukke

Rugby union career
- Position: Hooker
- Current team: Pumas
Youth career
- 1997: Pumas
- 2000: Golden Lions
- 2001–2002: Pumas
- 2003–2005: Leopards
Senior career
Years	Team	Apps	(Points)
2005–2010	Leopards	85	(30)
2007	→ Sharks	1	(0)
2011–2012	Pumas	34	(5)
2012–15	Colomiers	76	(5)
2018-	US Montauban	86	(50)
- Correct as of 15:18, 29 December 2019 (AEST)
International career
Years	Team	Apps	(Points)
2003	South Africa Under-19		
2004	South Africa Under-21		
2009	Royal XV		
2012	South African Barbarians (North)		
- Correct as of 08:28, 10 Aug 2012 (UTC)

Marthinus Riaan Stefanus 'Pellow' van der Westhuizen (born 3 February 1984) is a South African rugby union footballer. He plays mostly as a hooker. He represents the Pumas in the Currie Cup and Vodacom Cup having previously played for the Leopards and Sharks.

He joined French team Colomiers after the 2012 season.
