= Burton Francis =

South African rugby union footballer

- Full name: Burton Kenvin Francis
- Born: 2 January 1987 (age 39) Paarl, South Africa
- Height: 1.84 m (6 ft 1/2 in)
- Weight: 85 kg (187 lb; 13 st 5 lb)
- School: Klein Nederburg Secondary

Rugby union career
- Position: Fly-half
- Current team: Agen
Youth career
- 2004: Boland Cavaliers
- 2005: Leopards
- 2006–2007: Blue Bulls
Senior career
Years	Team	Apps	(Points)
2008–2009	Blue Bulls	27	(209)
2008–2009	Bulls	9	(14)
2010–2011	Lions	12	(52)
2010–2011	Golden Lions	15	(119)
2012	Stormers	6	(0)
2012	Western Province	1	(0)
2012	→ SWD Eagles	4	(11)
2013	Griquas	0	(0)
2013	Cheetahs	6	(62)
2013–17	Agen	110	(1,057)
- Correct as of 25 February 2017
International career
Years	Team	Apps	(Points)
2005	S.A. Schools B		

Burton Francis (born 2 January 1987) is a South African former professional rugby union player who played as a fly-half.

== Career ==
=== Youth ===
At youth level, he represented Boland Cavaliers at the 2004 Under-18 Academy Week. He moved to the Leopards in 2005 and played for them in the 2005 Under-18 Craven Week tournament, which also led to his inclusion in the S.A. Schools B team. He also represented the Leopards in the Under-19 Provincial Championship tournament.

In 2006, he joined the Blue Bulls and played for them at Under-19 and Under-21 level.

=== Blue Bulls / Bulls ===
He made his first class debut for the Blue Bulls in the 2008 Vodacom Cup match against the Mighty Elephants. Only two months later, he made his Super Rugby debut for the Bulls in their match against the Brumbies. He made several appearances for them in the Vodacom Cup and Currie Cup competitions in 2008 and 2009.

He was part of the Blue Bulls team who won the 2008 Vodacom Cup title against the Lions.

=== Golden Lions / Lions ===
In 2010, he moved across the Jukskei River to join the Golden Lions, representing them in both domestic competitions over the next two seasons, as well as making twelve appearances for the Lions in Super Rugby.

=== Western Province / Stormers ===
He joined Western Province in 2012 and was named 14 times in Super Rugby squads for the Stormers, but only made six appearances. He also only made one solitary appearance for Western Province in the 2012 Currie Cup Premier Division.

=== SWD Eagles ===
He joined the SWD Eagles on loan for the 2012 Currie Cup First Division season and was also named in the Southern Kings squad for the 2013 Super Rugby season, but was released after failing a medical test following a shoulder injury

=== Griquas / Cheetahs ===
His journey of South African teams continued when he joined Griquas for the 2013 Vodacom Cup season. Following an injury to Elgar Watts, he was included in the Cheetahs' Super Rugby squad. and never actually made a competitive appearance for Griquas.

=== Agen ===
In 2013, he joined French Pro D2 side Agen.
