= Nicolaas Pretorius =

South African cricketer (born 1989)

Personal information
- Born: 8 August 1989 (age 37); Pretoria, South Africa
- Batting: Right-handed
- Role: Batsman

Domestic team information
- Years: Team
- 2017–2019: Munster Reds
- T20 debut: 26 May 2017 Munster Reds v Northern Knights

Career statistics
Competition	Twenty20
Matches	10
Runs scored	112
Batting average	11.20
100s/50s	0/0
Top score	48
Catches/stumpings	9/–
- Source: ESPNcricinfo, 8 August 2025

Nicolaas Pretorius (born 8 August 1989) is a South African cricketer. He made his Twenty20 cricket debut for Munster Reds in the 2017 Inter-Provincial Trophy in Ireland on 26 May 2017.
