= Paolo Buso =

Italian rugby player

- Born: Paolo Buso; 28 July 1986 (age 40) Treviso, Italy
- Height: 1.83 m (6 ft 0 in)
- Weight: 88 kg (13 st 12 lb)

Rugby union career
- Position: Fly-Half / Fullback
Senior career
Years	Team	Apps	(Points)
2006–08	Rugby Calvisano	48	(106)
2009–10	Rugby Roma	13	(10)
2010–12	Aironi	4	(0)
2012–14	Zebre	16	(21)
2014−16	Grasse	11	(90)
2016−17	Macon	8	(5)
- Correct as of 11 February 2013
International career
Years	Team	Apps	(Points)
2006	Italy Under 20	3	(5)
2008–13	Italy	6	(10)
- Correct as of 11 February 2013

Paolo Buso (born 28 July 1986) is an Italian rugby player. He currently plays for Zebre.

== Career ==
After joining Calvisano at age 17 in 2003, Buso made the first team in 2006, and scored 30 points in 14 league matches in one season.

During the 2008 Six Nations Championship Coach Nick Mallett selected Buso in the senior squad where he appeared in the Cardiff match against Wales.

In the summer of 2009 he left Calvisano to play for Rugby Roma. In May 2010 he joined Aironi in the Celtic League.
