= Riaan Viljoen =

South African rugby union player

- Born: 1 April 1983 (age 43) Carletonville, South Africa
- Height: 1.79 m (5 ft 10 in)
- Weight: 90 kg (14 st 2 lb; 198 lb)
- School: Klerksdorp High School, South Africa

Rugby union career
- Position: Fullback / Flyhalf / Wing
Youth career
- 2002–2003: Sharks
Senior career
Years	Team	Apps	(Points)
2005–2007	Falcons	57	(218)
2008–2011	Griquas	74	(308)
2009–2011	Cheetahs	26	(45)
2010	→ Free State Cheetahs	1	(0)
2012–2013	Sharks	23	(40)
2012–2013	Sharks (Currie Cup)	11	(24)
2013–2015 2016–2020	NTT DoCoMo Red Hurricanes	61	(291)
2015	Griquas	14	(25)
2015–2017	Sunwolves	15	(16)
- Correct as of 22 July 2016
International career
Years	Team	Apps	(Points)
2009	South Africa	2	

Riaan Viljoen (born 1 April 1983) is a professional South African rugby union rugby player, currently playing with Japanese Super Rugby side the Sunwolves and Top League West side NTT DoCoMo Red Hurricanes. He was born in Carletonville, South Africa and his first tour with the Springboks was to France, Italy, Ireland and England in late 2009 where he played in two touring matches. He signed with the Sharks for the 2012 and the 2013 Super Rugby tournaments.

In 2013, he signed a deal to play in the Top League in Japan for NTT DoCoMo Red Hurricanes. For 2016 he joined the new Japanese Super Rugby team Sunwolves.

== Honours ==
- Tour matches: 2
- Total Springbok matches: 2
- Win ratio:
- Tours:
  - France, Italy, Ireland & England, 2009.
  - North West Craven Week 2001.
  - Griquas Currie Cup 2008.
