= Marlon Lewis =

South African rugby union player

- Full name: Marlon Shaun Lewis
- Born: 7 October 1987 (age 39) Port Elizabeth, South Africa
- Height: 1.60 m (5 ft 3 in)
- Weight: 75 kg (11 st 11 lb; 165 lb)
- School: Bertram Senior Secondary

Rugby union career
- Position: Scrum-half
- Current team: Despatch
Youth career
- 2004–2005: Eastern Province Kings
- 2006–2007: Blue Bulls
Amateur team(s)
Years	Team	Apps	(Points)
2013–present	Despatch	19	(13)
Senior career
Years	Team	Apps	(Points)
2006–2007	Blue Bulls	0	(0)
2008–2011	Eastern Province Kings	39	(31)
- Correct as of 7 April 2015
International career
Years	Team	Apps	(Points)
2005	South Africa Schools		
2005	South Africa Under-19		
- Correct as of 7 April 2015

Marlon Shaun Lewis (born 7 October 1987) is a South African rugby union player.

He played for the Mighty Elephants in various youth competitions, but moved to the Blue Bulls in 2006, where he was part of the 2006 Vodacom Cup squad. He stayed there for two seasons, then moved back to the Eastern Province Kings in 2008.
