= Hans van Dyk =

South African rugby union player

- Full name: Hans Jacob van Dyk
- Born: 29 April 1982 (age 44) Bethal, South Africa
- Height: 1.75 m (5 ft 9 in)
- Weight: 102 kg (16 st 1 lb; 225 lb)
- School: Middelburg Tech High School
- University: NWU Pukke
- Notable relative: BW van Dyk (brother)

Rugby union career
- Position: Hooker
Youth career
- 2002: Leopards
Senior career
Years	Team	Apps	(Points)
2005–2006	Leopards	43	(15)
2007–2008	Griquas	37	(30)
2007–2008	Cheetahs	6	(0)
2009–2010	Lions	15	(0)
2009–2010	Golden Lions	20	(10)
2010–2011	Pumas	13	(5)
2012	Boland Cavaliers	6	(0)
2012–2013	SWD Eagles	22	(0)
- Correct as of 7 October 2013
- Correct as of 11 April 2013

Hans van Dyk (born 29 April 1982) is a South African former professional rugby union player. His regular position was hooker.

He retired at the end of the 2013 season, having made more than 160 first class appearances for the Leopards, Griquas, Golden Lions, Pumas, Boland Cavaliers and SWD Eagles domestically and the Cheetahs and Lions in Super Rugby.

== Career ==
Van Dyk is a well-travelled player in South African domestic competition. He made his debut for the Leopards in 2005 and represented them for two seasons. In 2007, he joined the Griquas and was also called up into the Cheetahs Super Rugby squad, where he made six appearances.

After two seasons at Griquas, he joined Golden Lions and again played some Super Rugby, this time for the Lions.

In 2010, he then joined the Pumas for the 2010 Currie Cup Premier Division, but left them at the end of 2011.

He joined Boland Cavaliers for a short spell during the 2012 Vodacom Cup before joining SWD Eagles for the 2012 Currie Cup First Division.

Towards the end of 2012, he played in his 150th first class match.

He is the older brother of Leopards hooker BW van Dyk.
