= Anthonie Gronum =

South African rugby union player

- Full name: Anthonie Johannes Gronum
- Born: 15 June 1985 (age 41) Knysna, South Africa
- Height: 2.00 m (6 ft 6 1/2 in)
- Weight: 120 kg (18 st 13 lb; 265 lb)
- School: Oakdale Agricultural High School, Riversdale
- University: University of South Africa

Rugby union career
- Position: Lock
- Current team: Old Selbornians
Youth career
- 2002–2003: SWD Eagles
- 2005–2006: Blue Bulls
Amateur team(s)
Years	Team	Apps	(Points)
2015–present	Old Selbornians	2	(0)
Senior career
Years	Team	Apps	(Points)
2006	Blue Bulls	2	(0)
2007–2010	Leopards	55	(10)
2011–2014	Border Bulldogs	40	(0)
- Correct as of 30 March 2015

Anthonie Johannes Gronum (born 15 June 1985) is a South African rugby union player, currently playing with Border club side Old Selbornians. His regular position is lock.

== Career ==
He started his career at the Blue Bulls, making his first class debut in the 2006 Vodacom Cup. He failed to break into the Currie Cup squad and joined the Leopards in 2007, where he made 55 appearances over the next four seasons, 18 of those appearances in the Premier Division of the Currie Cup competition.

In 2011, he moved to East London to join the Border Bulldogs.
