= Gert Muller (rugby union, born 1986) =

South African rugby union player

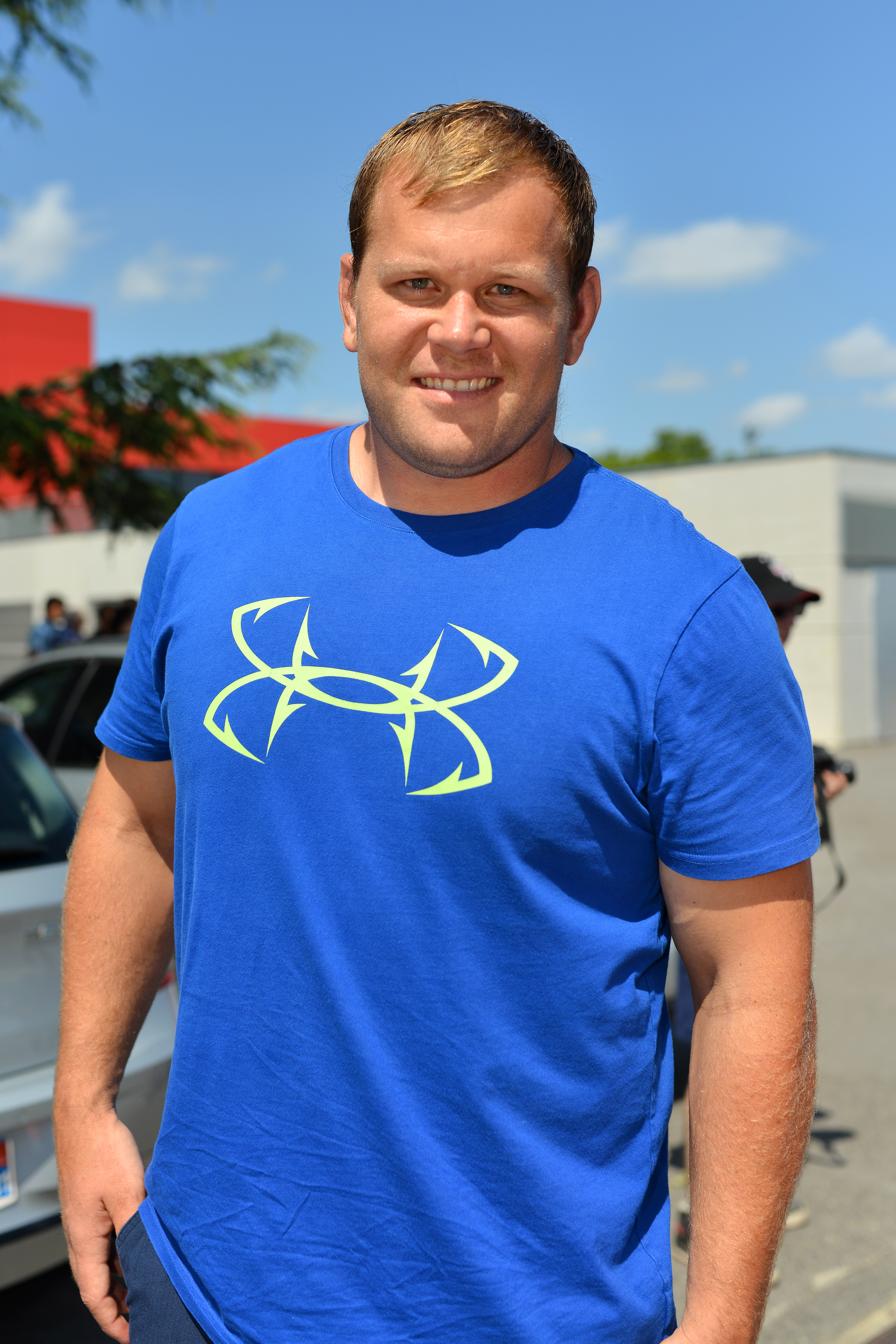
- Picture of Gert MULLER
- Born: Gert Hendrik Muller; 5 February 1986 (age 40)
- Height: 1.86 m (6 ft 1 in)
- Weight: 110 kg (17 st 5 lb)

Rugby union career
- Position: Prop
Senior career
| Years | Team | Apps | (Points) |
| 2010–2013 | Agen | 57 | (5) |
| 2013–15 | Bayonne | 44 | (5) |
| 2015-16 | Stade Toulousain | 7 | (0) |
| 2016- | USA Perpignan | 66 | (5) |
- Correct as of 23 December 2019
Provincial / State sides
| Years | Team | Apps | (Points) |
| 2006–2010 | Golden Lions | 38 | (20) |
Super Rugby
| Years | Team | Apps | (Points) |
| 2008–2010 | Lions | 17 | (0) |

Gert Hendrik Muller (born 5 February 1986) is a South African professional rugby union player. He currently plays at prop at Stade Toulousain in the French Top 14.
