= Ockert Kruger =

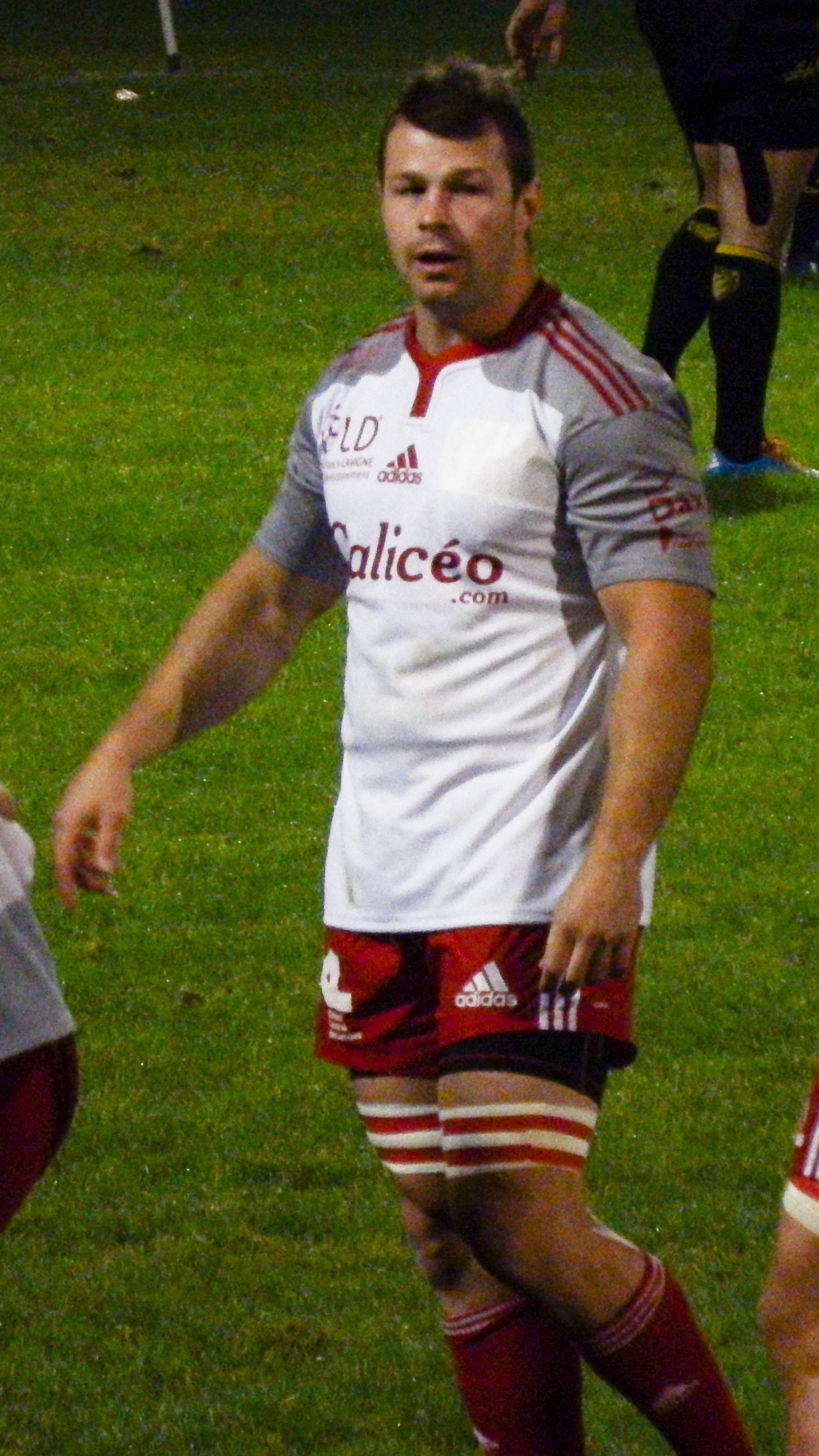
- Full name: Ockert Cornelius Kruger
- Born: 12 January 1987 (age 39) Empangeni, South Africa
- Height: 187 cm (6 ft 2 in)
- Weight: 97 kg (214 lb)
- University: University of Pretoria
- Occupation: Physician

Rugby union career
- Position: Flanker
Senior career
Years	Team	Apps	(Points)
2014–15	US Dax		
Super Rugby
Years	Team	Apps	(Points)
2010	Bulls		
Medal record
Men's rugby sevens
Representing South Africa
Commonwealth Games
Bronze medal – third place	2010 Delhi	Team competition

Ockert Cornelius Kruger (born 12 January 1987) is a South African former international rugby union player.

== Biography ==
=== Rugby career ===
Born in Empangeni, Kruger played his rugby as a flanker and competed in the Currie Cup with the Blue Bulls, winning their 2008 junior forward of the year award. In 2010, Kruger made his Super 14 debut for the Bulls and was a member of the South Africa rugby sevens team that won a bronze medal at the Commonwealth Games in Delhi. He played a season of professional rugby in France with US Dax in 2014–15 before retiring.

=== Personal life ===
Kruger is a physician by profession and practices medicine in Canada.
