= Nikolai Blignaut =

South African rugby union player

- Full name: Hendrik Nikolai Blignaut
- Born: 10 January 1985 (age 41) East London, South Africa
- Height: 1.93 m (6 ft 4 in)
- Weight: 110 kg (17 st 5 lb; 243 lb)
- School: Baysville Secondary School, East London
- University: Oakridge College, Durban

Rugby union career
- Position: Lock
- Current team: College Rovers
Youth career
- 2002: Border Bulldogs
- 2004–2006: Sharks
Amateur team(s)
Years	Team	Apps	(Points)
2013–present	College Rovers	18	(15)
Senior career
Years	Team	Apps	(Points)
2005–2009	Sharks (Currie Cup)	41	(15)
2010	Boland Cavaliers	14	(5)
2014	Sharks (Currie Cup)	4	(0)
- Correct as of 7 April 2015
International career
Years	Team	Apps	(Points)
2004	South Africa Under-19		
2005–2006	South Africa Under-21	10	(0)
2007	Emerging Springboks	2	(0)
- Correct as of 24 March 2015

Hendrik Nikolai Blignaut (born 1 October 1985 in East London, South Africa) is a rugby union player for club side College Rovers. He previously played provincial rugby for the Sharks and Boland Cavaliers and usually plays as a lock or flanker.
