= Piet van Zyl (rugby union, born 1979) =

Namibia international rugby union player

- Born: Piet van Zyl; 14 May 1979 (age 47) Worcester, South Africa
- Height: 1.81 m (5 ft 11 in)
- Weight: 95 kg (209 lb)

Rugby union career
- Position: Centre
Senior career
Years	Team	Apps	(Points)
2009–2012	Bourgoin	39	(14)
- Correct as of 21 May 2013
Provincial / State sides
Years	Team	Apps	(Points)
2006–2008	Boland Cavaliers	28	(30)
- Correct as of 21 May 2013
Super Rugby
Years	Team	Apps	(Points)
2008–2009	Cheetahs	9	(0)
- Correct as of 21 May 2013
International career
Years	Team	Apps	(Points)
2007–present	Namibia	14	(15)
- Correct as of 9 September 2007

Piet van Zyl (born 14 May 1979) is a Namibian rugby union player who captained the Boland Cavaliers in South Africa at provincial level, and played for the Namibia at international level. Van Zyl was in the Namibian squad for the 2007 World Cup, and scored a try in his nation's first match in the competition, in a game against Ireland. Van Zyl plays as a centre. Van Zyl made his debut in August 2007 in a friendly match against South Africa.
