= John Mametsa =

South African rugby union player

- Born: Sello John Mametsa; 10 March 1981 (age 45)
- Height: 1.73 m (5 ft 8 in)
- Weight: 78 kg (172 lb)

Rugby union career
- Position: Wing
Provincial / State sides
Years	Team	Apps	(Points)
2002–2010	Blue Bulls	136	(355)
Super Rugby
Years	Team	Apps	(Points)
2008, 2010	Bulls	6	(5)
International career
Years	Team	Apps	(Points)
- N/A
- Correct as of Dec 2010

Sello John Mametsa (born 10 March 1981 in Polokwane) is a South African rugby union player, the first black South African to have appeared in 100 Currie Cup games.

== Playing career ==
Starting as a junior with the Gauteng franchise the Vodacom Blue Bulls in 2001, Mametsa has since appeared for the Bulls in the Vodacom Cup, the Currie Cup, and the Super 14 series, usually on the wing.

Making his Currie Cup debut in 2002, Mametsa was named Currie Cup player of the year in 2003. During his 100th game against the Lions at Ellis Park Stadium on 21 June 2008, he scored three tries for the Bulls, and went on to score the most tries (7) by any Bulls player that year. He was part of the Blue Bulls team that won the Currie Cup in 2003 and 2004, and that shared the trophy with the Vodacom Cheetahs in 2006.

He was also part of the Blue Bulls team who won the 2008 Vodacom Cup against the Lions.

In 2008 he made his debut in the Super 14 series, winning 6 caps.

During his career from 2002 to 2010, Mametsa played 136 provincial games for the Blue Bulls, scoring 355 points. When he retired in 2010, his 71 career tries placed him third on the list of all-time tries scored by Blue Bulls players, and joint 10th on the Blue Bulls' list of most career matches.

He scored a hattrick in his 100th match for the Blue Bulls against the Lions in the 2008 Currie Cup which the Bulls won 21-7.

== Miscellaneous ==
On 18 October 2008, one week prior to the Absa Currie Cup final in which he was to play on the losing side against the Natal Sharks, Mametsa was assaulted by traffic police and arrested for seven hours. Mametsa had intervened on behalf of teammate Fudge Mabeta, an occasional lock for the Bulls, who had allegedly reversed his car into a traffic official’s vehicle. All charges against Mametsa were withdrawn in the Hatfield Community Court on 2 June 2009.

== Accolades ==
in 2003, Mametsa was one of the five nominees for Young Player of the Year, along with Schalk Burger, Jaque Fourie, Fourie du Preez and recipient of the award, Ashwin Willemse.
