= Morgan Newman =

South African rugby union player

- Full name: Morgan Ram Newman
- Born: 5 February 1986 (age 40) Cape Town, South Africa
- Height: 1.80 m (5 ft 11 in)
- Weight: 91 kg (14 st 5 lb; 201 lb)
- School: Bishops, Cape Town
- University: Stellenbosch University

Rugby union career
- Position: Centre
- Current team: Hamiltons
Amateur team(s)
Years	Team	Apps	(Points)
2014–present	Hamiltons	11	(5)
Senior career
Years	Team	Apps	(Points)
2006–2010	Western Province	60	(92)
2009	Stormers	5	(0)
2011	Free State Cheetahs	9	(20)
2011	Eastern Province Kings	1	(0)
- Correct as of 7 April 2015

Morgan Ram Newman (born 5 February 1986) is a South African rugby union player, currently playing with Western Province Premier League side Hamiltons.

He was born in Cape Town and started his rugby career with Western Province, representing them at various age groups. In 2011, he moved to the Free State Cheetahs for a short spell before joining the Eastern Province Kings for a six-month spell later in that year.
