= Jody Jenneker =

South African rugby union player

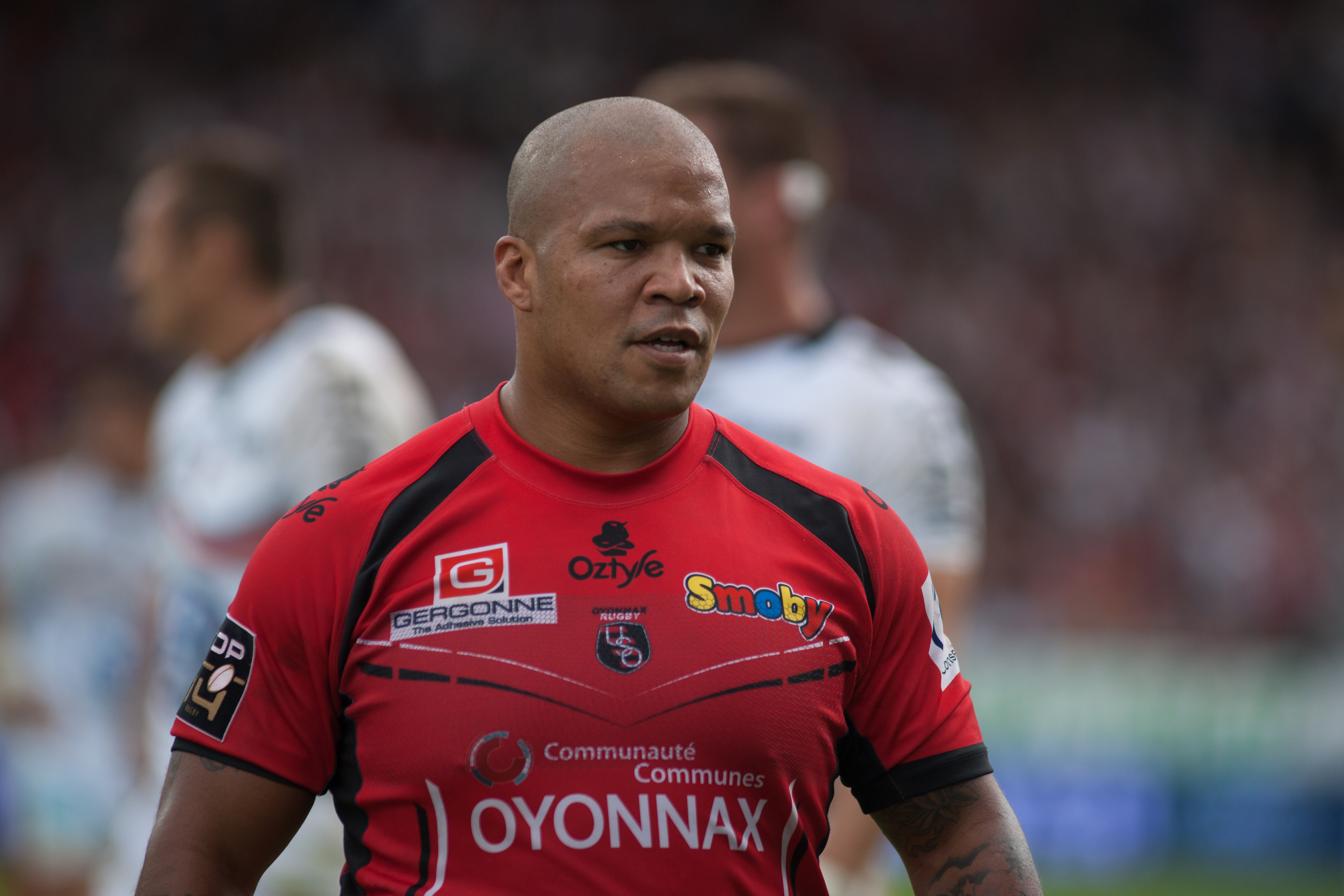
- Born: April 10, 1984 (age 42) Durban, South Africa
- Height: 1.82 m (5 ft 11 1/2 in)
- Weight: 106 kg (234 lb; 16 st 10 lb)

Rugby union career
- Position: Hooker
Senior career
Years	Team	Apps	(Points)
2016-Present	Castres	55	(35)
2012-2016	Oyonnax	107	(50)
2011-2012	Lyon	8	(0)
2011-2012	Dijon	10	(10)
Provincial / State sides
Years	Team	Apps	(Points)
2006-2008	Sharks	34	(10)
Super Rugby
Years	Team	Apps	(Points)
2005-2006	Sharks	1	(0)

Jody Jenneker (born 10 April 1984 in Durban, South Africa) is a rugby union player who played for the Sharks in the Super Rugby competition. He plays as a hooker. He now plays in France for Castres.

Jenkker was suspended for three weeks for striking Maxime Médard in their semi-final qualifier against Toulouse on May 18, 2018.
