= Rocco Jansen =

South African rugby union player

- Full name: Rocco Reginald Jansen
- Born: 21 July 1986 (age 40) Queenstown, South Africa
- Height: 1.79 m (5 ft 10 1/2 in)
- Weight: 91 kg (201 lb; 14 st 5 lb)
- School: Queen's College
- University: North-West University

Rugby union career
- Position: Winger / Fullback
Senior career
Years	Team	Apps	(Points)
2007–2009	Blue Bulls	29	(115)
2009	Mighty Elephants	5	(30)
2009	Sharks (Currie Cup)	1	(0)
2010–2015	Griquas	87	(175)
2012	Cheetahs	4	(0)
2007–2015	Total	126	(320)
- Correct as of 12 October 2015
International career
Years	Team	Apps	(Points)
2008	Emerging Springboks	3	(5)
- Correct as of 12 June 2014

Rocco Reginald Jansen (born 21 July 1986) is a South African former rugby union player. His regular playing position is wing. He most recently represented Griquas in the Currie Cup. He has previously played for the Blue Bulls.

He retired at the end of the 2015 season to take up a role in the business sector.
