= Juandré Kruger =

South African rugby union player (born 1985)

- Full name: Petrus Johannes Juandré Kruger
- Born: 6 September 1985 (age 41) Cape Town, South Africa
- Height: 1.99 m (6 ft 6 1/2 in)
- Weight: 114 kg (17 st 13 lb; 251 lb)
- School: Paul Roos Gymnasium
- University: Stellenbosch University
- Occupation(s): Professional Rugby Player & Business Person

Rugby union career
- Position: Lock
Youth career
- 2004–2006: Western Province
Senior career
Years	Team	Apps	(Points)
2007	Western Province	5	(10)
2008	Blue Bulls	18	(10)
2008–2010	Northampton Saints	53	(15)
2010–2013	Blue Bulls	33	(35)
2011–2013	Bulls	31	(5)
2013–2016	Racing Métro 92	42	(15)
2016–2019	Toulon	67	(10)
2019	Scarlets	4	(0)
2020	Bulls	4	(0)
- Correct as of 28 April 2021
International career
Years	Team	Apps	(Points)
2012–present	South Africa	17	(0)
- Correct as of 6 October 2013

Juandré Kruger (born 6 September 1985) is a South African professional Rugby union footballer, contracted to Rugby Club Toulon in the French Top 14. His preferred position is at Lock although he has also played in the back row.

== Career ==
=== Early provincial career in South Africa ===
He is widely regarded as one of the best up-and-coming second-row forward prospects in South African rugby. He started his career off at Western Province, representing them in the 2007 Vodacom Cup. From there he moved to Blue Bulls, competing for them in the 2008 Vodacom Cup. He also featured for the Blue Bulls in the 2008 Currie Cup, at times being preferred to Springbok internationals Victor Matfield and Bakkies Botha. Kruger was an unused replacement in the Final of the 2008 Currie Cup, against the Sharks.

=== Northampton Saints ===
Kruger then made the move to Northampton Saints. He enjoyed a successful partnership with Ignacio Fernández Lobbe. In his first season at the club, he won the ECC. In his second and final season, he featured in the Heineken Cup, played in a Guinness Premiership Semi Final and won the Anglo-Welsh Cup.

=== Return to The Bulls ===
Kruger re-joined the Blue Bulls in 2010.

=== Racing Metro ===
In 2013 Kruger made the move with his family to Paris joining Top 14 club Racing 92

=== Springboks ===
On 2 June 2012, Juandré Kruger was called up to the Springbok squad for the first time for the inbound series against England. This was his first National selection. On 6 June, it was announced by Springbok coach Heyneke Meyer that Kruger would start at lock (number 5) for the first test of the series against England in Durban on 9 June 2012 . This would mark Kruger's debut for South Africa. With South Africa running out 22-17 victors in the first test Kruger had made a good start to the series. He played all three matches. In the second game South Africa won 36-27 thanks to a late try from Pietersen but were held to a 14–14 draw in the final test.

== Honours ==
(France) Racing 92

- Top 14: 2015–16
