= Highveld XV =

Club information
- Full name: Royal Highveld XV
- Colours: Green, white and blue
- Founded: 2009

Current details
- Ground: Royal Bafokeng Stadium

The Highveld XV, also known for sponsorship reasons as the Royal Bafokeng Nation Highveld XV or simply the Royal XV, are a composite provincial rugby union team from South Africa.

Like their Coastal XV counterparts, the Highveld XV were created by the South African Rugby Union to provide an opponent for the British & Irish Lions as part of their 2009 tour to South Africa. It is not known if the team will be re-activated for future tours or if this was just a one-off operation. The Coastal XV however was rebranded as the Southern Kings, which played in Super Rugby in 2013.

Traditionally the Lions only play against the best Currie Cup teams when touring South Africa but the South African Rugby Union felt the best players from all teams should have an opportunity to play against the touring side. As a result, two composite teams regrouping players from weaker unions were created, the Highveld XV being one of them.

The team represents most of the Highveld region in the country's north-west. It draws players from the Griquas from the Northern Cape Province, the Leopards from the North West Province, the Pumas from Mpumalanga Province, the Griffons from part of the Free State Province and the Falcons (Valke) from part of Gauteng.

The Highveld XV played their first game against the touring Lions on 30 May 2009 at the Royal Bafokeng Stadium in Rustenburg and lost 25 to 37.

== See also ==
- 2009 British & Irish Lions tour to South Africa
