= 2009 Super 14 season =

Men's rugby union club competition

2009 Super 14
- Countries: Australia; South Africa; New Zealand
- Tournament format(s): Round-robin and knockout
- Champions: (South Africa) Bulls (2nd title)
- Matches played: 94
- Tries scored: 506 (5.38 per match)
- Top point scorer(s): (South Africa) Morné Steyn (189) (Bulls)
- Top try scorer(s): (New Zealand) Ma'a Nonu (9) (Hurricanes)

The 2009 Super 14 season kicked off in February 2009 with pre-season matches held from mid-January. It finished on 30 May, when the Bulls won their second Super Rugby title with a decisive 61–17 victory over the Chiefs at Loftus Versfeld stadium in Pretoria, South Africa. The 2009 season was the fourth of the expansion, which led to the name change to the Super 14. The schedule, which covered 3½ months, featured a total of 94 matches, with each team playing one full round-robin against the 13 other teams, two semi-finals and a final. Every team received one bye over the 14 rounds.

== Table ==
2009 Super 14 table
Pos	Team	Pld	W	D	L	PF	PA	PD	B	Pts	Qualification
1	(South Africa) Bulls	13	10	0	3	338	271	+67	6	46	Advanced to the playoffs
2	(New Zealand) Chiefs	13	9	0	4	338	236	+102	9	45	Advanced to the playoffs
3	(New Zealand) Hurricanes	13	9	0	4	380	279	+101	8	44	Advanced to the playoffs
4	(New Zealand) Crusaders	13	8	1	4	231	198	+33	7	41	Advanced to the playoffs
5	(Australia) Waratahs	13	9	0	4	241	212	+29	5	41	
6	(South Africa) Sharks	13	8	0	5	282	239	+43	6	38	
7	(Australia) Brumbies	13	8	0	5	311	305	+6	6	38	
8	(Australia) Western Force	13	6	1	6	328	275	+53	10	36	
9	(New Zealand) Blues	13	5	0	8	339	369	−30	12	32	
10	(South Africa) Stormers	13	5	0	8	235	249	−14	7	27	
11	(New Zealand) Highlanders	13	4	0	9	254	269	−15	10	26	
12	(South Africa) Lions	13	4	0	9	294	419	−125	9	25	
13	(Australia) Reds	13	3	0	10	258	380	−122	7	19	
14	(South Africa) Cheetahs	13	2	0	11	213	341	−128	4	12	

Updated to match(es) played on 17 May 2009. Source:

== Results ==
=== Round 1 ===
13 February 2009	Highlanders (New Zealand)	31–33	(Australia) Brumbies	Carisbrook, Dunedin
19:35	Tries: Jason Shoemark, Fetuʻu Vainikolo, Daniel Bowden, Chris King, Jason Rutledge; Con: Daniel Bowden (3)	Report	Tries: Stirling Mortlock (2), Adam Ashley-Cooper, Mark Gerrard; Con: Mark Gerrard (2); Pen: Mark Gerrard (2); Drop: Christian Lealiifano	Attendance: 4,670; Referee: James Leckie (Australia)

13 February 2009	Western Force (Australia)	19–25	(New Zealand) Blues	Subiaco Oval, Perth
19:45	Tries: AJ Whalley, Drew Mitchell, Tom Hockings; Con: Matt Giteau (2)	Report	Tries: Chris Lowrey, Justin Collins, Anthony Boric, Taniela Moa; Con: Paul Williams; Pen: Paul Williams	Attendance: 19,309; Referee: Bryce Lawrence (New Zealand)

13 February 2009	Lions (South Africa)	34–28	(South Africa) Cheetahs	Coca-Cola Park, Johannesburg
19:10	Tries: Ashwin Willemse (2), Cobus Grobbelaar, Henno Mentz; Con: Earl Rose (4); Drop: Earl Rose, André Pretorius	Report	Tries: Frans Viljoen, Heinrich Brüssow, Jacques-Louis Potgieter; Con: Jacques-Louis Potgieter (2); Pen: Jacques-Louis Potgieter (3)	Attendance: 46,500; Referee: Craig Joubert (South Africa)

- Todd Clever came off the bench for the Lions to become the first American ever to play in Super Rugby.

14 February 2009	Crusaders (New Zealand)	19–13	(New Zealand) Chiefs	AMI Stadium, Christchurch
17:30	Tries: Casey Laulala (2), Tim Bateman; Con: Colin Slade (2)	Report	Tries: Richard Kahui, Lelia Masaga; Pen: Stephen Donald	Attendance: 13,500; Referee: Chris Pollock (New Zealand)

14 February 2009	Hurricanes (New Zealand)	22–26	(Australia) Waratahs	Westpac Stadium, Wellington
19:35	Tries: Daniel Kirkpatrick, Dane Coles, Hosea Gear; Con: Daniel Kirkpatrick (2); Pen: Daniel Kirkpatrick	Report	Tries: Sam Norton-Knight, Lote Tuqiri, Lachlan Turner, Rob Horne; Con: Kurtley Beale (3)	Attendance: 12,835; Referee: Stuart Dickinson (Australia)

14 February 2009	Stormers (South Africa)	15–20	(South Africa) Sharks	Newlands, Cape Town
17:00	Tries: Gcobani Bobo, Peter Grant; Con: Peter Grant; Pen: Peter Grant	Report	Tries: John Smit, Stefan Terblanche; Con: Rory Kockott (2); Pen: Rory Kockott (2)	Attendance: 47,604; Referee: Mark Lawrence (South Africa)

14 February 2009	Bulls (South Africa)	33–20	(Australia) Reds	Loftus Versfeld, Pretoria
19:10	Tries: Fourie du Preez, Wynand Olivier, Burton Francis, Pierre Spies; Con: Morné Steyn (2); Pen: Morné Steyn (3)	Report	Tries: Digby Ioane, Peter Hynes; Con: Berrick Barnes, Quade Cooper; Pen: Ben Lucas; Drop: Berrick Barnes	Attendance: 25,142; Referee: Marius Jonker (South Africa)

=== Round 2 ===
20 February 2009	Hurricanes (New Zealand)	22–17	(New Zealand) Highlanders	Westpac Stadium, Wellington
19:35	Tries: David Smith, Jason Eaton, Conrad Smith; Con: Daniel Kirkpatrick, Piri Weepu; Pen: Daniel Kirkpatrick	Report	Tries: Daniel Bowden, Stephen Setephano; Con: Daniel Bowden (2); Pen: Daniel Bowden	Attendance: 11,706; Referee: Vinny Munro (New Zealand)

20 February 2009	Waratahs (Australia)	11–7	(New Zealand) Chiefs	Sydney Football Stadium, Sydney
19:40	Tries: Timana Tahu; Pen: Kurtley Beale; Drop: Kurtley Beale	Report	Tries: Sona Taumalolo; Con: Stephen Donald	Attendance: 21,581; Referee: Stuart Dickinson (Australia)

20 February 2009	Western Force (Australia)	16–10	(South Africa) Cheetahs	Subiaco Oval, Perth
19:45	Tries: James O'Connor; Con: Matt Giteau; Pen: Matt Giteau (2); Drop: Matt Giteau	Report	Tries: Danwel Demas; Con: Jacques Louis Potgieter; Pen: Jacques Louis Potgieter	Attendance: 16,500; Referee: James Leckie (Australia)

20 February 2009	Stormers (South Africa)	27–24	(Australia) Reds	Newlands Stadium, Cape Town
19:10	Tries: Andries Bekker, Tonderai Chavanga, Sireli Naqelevuki; Con: Peter Grant (3); Pen: Peter Grant (2)	Report	Tries: Quade Cooper, Anthony Fainga'a, Scott Higginbotham, Van Humphries; Con: Ben Lucas (2)	Attendance: 33,022; Referee: Chris Pollock (New Zealand)

20 February 2009	Brumbies (Australia)	18–16	(New Zealand) Crusaders	Canberra Stadium, Canberra
19:40	Tries: Christian Leallifano, Mark Gerrard; Con: Stirling Mortlock; Pen: Christian Leallifano, Stirling Mortlock	Report	Tries: Casey Laulala, Ross Filipo; Pen: Colin Slade, Stephen Brett	Attendance: 17,501; Referee: Bryce Lawrence (New Zealand)

20 February 2009	Bulls (South Africa)	59–26	(New Zealand) Blues	Loftus Versfeld, Pretoria
17:00	Tries: Pierre Spies (2), Bryan Habana, Dewald Potgieter, Zane Kirchner, Fourie du Preez, Wynand Olivier; Con: Morné Steyn (4), Burton Francis (2); Pen: Morné Steyn (3); Drop: Morné Steyn	Report	Tries: Rene Ranger, Anthony Tuitavake, Benson Stanley, Isaia Toeava; Con: Jimmy Gopperth (2), Michael Hobbs	Attendance: 25,886; Referee: Mark Lawrence (South Africa)

20 February 2009	Sharks (South Africa)	25–10	(South Africa) Lions	ABSA Stadium, Durban
19:10	Tries: Deon Carstens, JP Pietersen, Ryan Kankowski; Con: Rory Kockott (2); Pen: Ruan Pienaar, Rory Kockott	Report	Tries: Ashwin Willemse; Con: Earl Rose; Drop: Earl Rose	Attendance: 34,461; Referee: Jonathan Kaplan (South Africa)

=== Round 3 ===
27 February 2009	Crusaders (New Zealand)	24–30	(New Zealand) Hurricanes	AMI Stadium, Christchurch
19:35	Tries: Casey Laulala, Brad Thorn, Jared Payne, Thomas Waldrom; Con: Colin Slade, Stephen Brett	Report	Tries: Zac Guildford, Alby Mathewson, Ma'a Nonu; Con: Piri Weepu (3); Pen: Piri Weepu (3)	Attendance: 17,500; Referee: Stuart Dickinson (Australia)

27 February 2009	Waratahs (Australia)	34–16	(New Zealand) Highlanders	Sydney Football Stadium, Sydney
19:40	Tries: Lote Tuqiri, Ben Mowen, Wycliff Palu, Brett Sheehan; Con: Kurtley Beale (3), Daniel Halangahu; Pen: Kurtley Beale (2)	Report	Tries: Jason Shoemark; Con: Daniel Bowden; Pen: Daniel Bowden (3)	Attendance: 19,492; Referee: James Leckie (Australia)

28 February 2009	Chiefs (New Zealand)	15–22	(South Africa) Sharks	Waikato Stadium, Hamilton
19:35	Tries: Aled de Malmanche, Brendon Leonard; Con: Stephen Donald; Pen: Stephen Donald	Report	Tries: JP Pietersen (2), François Steyn; Con: Rory Kockott (2); Pen: Rory Kockott	Attendance: 6,100; Referee: Bryce Lawrence (New Zealand)

28 February 2009	Brumbies (Australia)	16–25	(Australia) Western Force	Canberra Stadium, Canberra
19:40	Tries: Penalty try Con: Stirling Mortlock; Pen: Mark Gerrard (3)	Report	Tries: Cameron Shepherd (3), Richard Brown; Con: Matt Giteau; Pen: Matt Giteau	Attendance: 15,893; Referee: Matt Goddard (Australia)

28 February 2009	Lions (South Africa)	9–16	(South Africa) Bulls	Coca Cola Park, Johannesburg
17:00	Pen: André Pretorius (2); Earl Rose	Report	Tries: Pierre Spies; Con: Morné Steyn; Pen: Morné Steyn (3)	Attendance: 27,000; Referee: Phillip Bosch (South Africa)

28 February 2009	Stormers (South Africa)	8–14	(New Zealand) Blues	Newlands Stadium, Cape Town
19:10	Tries: Ricky Januarie; Pen: Peter Grant	Report	Tries: Paul Williams; Pen: Paul Williams (3)	Attendance: 39,777; Referee: Jonathan Kaplan (South Africa)

1 March 2009	Reds (Australia)	22–3	(South Africa) Cheetahs	Suncorp Stadium, Brisbane
16:00	Tries: Mark McLinden, Digby Ioane, Peter Hynes; Con: Ben Lucas, Berrick Barnes; Pen: Ben Lucas	Report	Pen: Jacques Louis Potgieter	Attendance: 16,295; Referee: Ian Smith (Australia)

=== Round 4 ===
6 March 2009	Chiefs (New Zealand)	31–13	(Australia) Western Force	Waikato Stadium, Hamilton
19:35	Tries: Lelia Masaga, Brendon Leonard, Richard Kahui, Colin Bourke; Con: Stephen Donald (4); Pen: Stephen Donald	Report	Tries: Tamaiti Horua; Con: Matt Giteau; Pen: Matt Giteau, Cameron Shepherd	Attendance: 13,500; Referee: Matt Goddard (Australia)

6 March 2009	Waratahs (Australia)	15–11	(Australia) Reds	Sydney Football Stadium, Sydney
19:40	Tries: Benn Robinson, Timana Tahu; Con: Kurtley Beale; Pen: Kurtley Beale	Report	Tries: Peter Hynes; Pen: Ben Lucas (2)	Attendance: 28,109; Referee: Bryce Lawrence (New Zealand)

7 March 2009	Hurricanes (New Zealand)	29–12	(South Africa) Cheetahs	Yarrow Stadium, New Plymouth
14:30	Tries: Hosea Gear (2), Tamati Ellison, John Schwalger; Con: Piri Weepu (2), Willie Ripia; Pen: Piri Weepu	Report	Tries: Sarel Pretorius, Wayne van Heerden; Con: Jacques Louis Potgieter	Attendance: 6,294; Referee: Paul Marks (Australia)

7 March 2009	Blues (New Zealand)	31–35	(South Africa) Sharks	Eden Park, Auckland
17:30	Tries: Isaia Toeava, Jimmy Gopperth, Joe Rokocoko; Con: Jimmy Gopperth (2); Pen: Jimmy Gopperth (4)	Report	Tries: JP Pietersen, Jacques Botes, Steven Sykes, John Smit; Con: Rory Kockott (3); Pen: Rory Kockott (2); Drop: Rory Kockott	Attendance: 23,908; Referee: Marius Jonker (South Africa)

7 March 2009	Highlanders (New Zealand)	6–0	(New Zealand) Crusaders	Carisbrook, Dunedin
19:35	Pen: Daniel Bowden (2)	Report		Attendance: 11,800; Referee: Ian Smith (Australia)

7 March 2009	Bulls (South Africa)	14–10	(South Africa) Stormers	Loftus Versfeld, Pretoria
17:00	Tries: Wynand Olivier; Pen: Morné Steyn (2); Drop: Morné Steyn	Report	Tries: Deon Fourie; Con: Peter Grant; Drop: Willem de Waal	Attendance: 50,000; Referee: Craig Joubert (South Africa)

=== Round 5 ===
13 March 2009	Blues (New Zealand)	46–12	(South Africa) Cheetahs	North Harbour Stadium, North Shore City
19:35	Tries: Anthony Tuitavake, Chris Lowrey, Isaia Toeava, Taniela Moa, James Helleur, Chris Smylie; Con: Jimmy Gopperth (5); Pen: Jimmy Gopperth (2)	Report	Tries: Corne Uys, Kabamba Floors; Con: Jacques Louis Potgieter	Attendance: 7,140; Referee: Keith Brown (New Zealand)

13 March 2009	Brumbies (Australia)	21–11	(Australia) Waratahs	Canberra Stadium, Canberra
19:40	Tries: Adam Ashley-Cooper, Ben Alexander; Con: Mark Gerrard; Pen: Mark Gerrard (3)	Report	Tries: Lachlan Turner; Pen: Kurtley Beale (2)	Attendance: 21,594; Referee: Mark Lawrence (South Africa)

14 March 2009	Crusaders (New Zealand)	23–23	(Australia) Western Force	AMI Stadium, Christchurch
17:30	Tries: Ryan Crotty, Tim Bateman, Isaac Ross; Con: Stephen Brett; Pen: Stephen Brett (2)	Report	Tries: Haig Sare, James O'Connor; Con: Matt Giteau (2); Pen: Matt Giteau (3)	Attendance: 18,850; Referee: Marius Jonker (South Africa)

14 March 2009	Highlanders (New Zealand)	10–14	(New Zealand) Chiefs	Rugby Park Stadium, Invercargill
19:35	Tries: Fetuʻu Vainikolo; Con: Daniel Bowden; Pen: Daniel Bowden	Report	Tries: Tanerau Latimer, Lelia Masaga; Con: Stephen Donald (2)	Attendance: 7,000; Referee: Matt Goddard (Australia)

14 March 2009	Reds (Australia)	25–13	(South Africa) Sharks	Suncorp Stadium, Brisbane
19:05	Tries: Adam Byrnes, Will Genia, Digby Ioane; Con: Berrick Barnes (2); Pen: Ben Lucas, Berrick Barnes	Report	Tries: Ryan Kankowski; Con: Rory Kockott; Pen: Rory Kockott (2)	Attendance: 20,582; Referee: James Leckie (Australia)

14 March 2009	Stormers (South Africa)	56–18	(South Africa) Lions	Newlands Stadium, Cape Town
17:00	Tries: Andries Bekker (2), Schalk Burger, Francois Louw, Gcobani Bobo, Sireli Naqelevuki, Jean de Villiers, Dewaldt Duvenage; Con: Peter Grant (4), Willem de Waal; Pen: Willem de Waal (2)	Report	Tries: Louis Ludik, Henno Mentz; Con: André Pretorius; Pen: André Pretorius (2)	Attendance: 32,004; Referee: Craig Joubert (South Africa)

=== Round 6 ===
20 March 2009	Hurricanes (New Zealand)	14–19	(South Africa) Bulls	Westpac Stadium, Wellington
19:35	Tries: Tamati Ellison, Jason Eaton; Con: Piri Weepu (2)	Report	Tries: JP Nel; Con: Morné Steyn; Pen: Morné Steyn (4)	Attendance: 16,139; Referee: Matt Goddard (Australia)

21 March 2009	Highlanders (New Zealand)	32–8	(South Africa) Cheetahs	Carisbrook, Dunedin
17:30	Tries: Adam Thomson (2), Israel Dagg (2), Stephen Setephano; Con: Matt Berquist (2); Pen: Matt Berquist	Report	Tries: Corne Uys; Pen: Jacques Louis Potgieter	Attendance: 4,000; Referee: Paul Marks (Australia)

21 March 2009	Chiefs (New Zealand)	63–34	(New Zealand) Blues	Waikato Stadium, Hamilton
19:35	Tries: Sitiveni Sivivatu (4), Richard Kahui, Brendon Leonard, Liam Messam, Lelia Masaga, Callum Bruce; Con: Stephen Donald (8), Mike Delany	Report	Tries: Joe Rokocoko (2), Isaia Toeava, Anthony Tuitavake, James Helleur; Con: Jimmy Gopperth (3); Pen: Jimmy Gopperth	Attendance: 16,000; Referee: Mark Lawrence (South Africa)

21 March 2009	Waratahs (Australia)	13–17	(New Zealand) Crusaders	ANZ Stadium, Sydney
19:40	Tries: Benn Robinson; Con: Kurtley Beale; Pen: Kurtley Beale, Daniel Halangahu	Report	Tries: Kieran Read, Leon MacDonald; Con: Stephen Brett (2); Pen: Colin Slade	Attendance: 32,469; Referee: Chris Pollock (New Zealand)

21 March 2009	Western Force (Australia)	10–22	(South Africa) Sharks	Subiaco Oval, Perth
19:45	Tries: Scott Staniforth; Con: Matt Giteau; Pen: Matt Giteau	Report	Tries: JP Pietersen, Odwa Ndungane, Rory Kockott; Con: Rory Kockott (2); Drop: François Steyn	Attendance: 19,076; Referee: Bryce Lawrence (New Zealand)

21 March 2009	Lions (South Africa)	25–17	(Australia) Brumbies	Coca Cola Park, Johannesburg
17:00	Tries: Jaque Fourie, Jano Vermaak, Louis Ludik; Con: André Pretorius (2); Pen: André Pretorius; Drop: André Pretorius	Report	Tries: Stirling Mortlock, Mark Chisholm; Con: Stirling Mortlock, Mark Gerrard; Pen: Mark Gerrard	Attendance: 7,720; Referee: Jonathan Kaplan (South Africa)

=== Round 7 ===
27 March 2009	Blues (New Zealand)	22–27	(Australia) Waratahs	Eden Park, Auckland
19:35	Tries: Anthony Tuitavake, Onosai Tololima-Auva'a, Michael Hobbs; Con: Jimmy Gopperth (2); Pen: Jimmy Gopperth	Report	Tries: Daniel Halangahu, Luke Burgess, Tatafu Polota-Nau; Con: Daniel Halangahu (3); Pen: Daniel Halangahu (2)	Attendance: 17,500; Referee: Craig Joubert (South Africa)

28 March 2009	Highlanders (New Zealand)	36–12	(South Africa) Bulls	FMG Stadium, Palmerston North
17:30	Tries: Jason Shoemark, Daniel Bowden, Jimmy Cowan, Matt Berquist, Israel Dagg; Con: Matt Berquist (4); Pen: Matt Berquist	Report	Tries: Gerhard van den Heever, Morné Steyn; Con: Morné Steyn	Attendance: 10,000; Referee: Vinny Munro (New Zealand)

28 March 2009	Crusaders (New Zealand)	11–7	(South Africa) Stormers	AMI Stadium, Christchurch
19:35	Tries: Adam Whitelock; Pen: Stephen Brett (2)	Report	Tries: Luke Watson; Con: Willem de Waal	Attendance: 17,500; Referee: Keith Brown (New Zealand)

28 March 2009	Reds (Australia)	26–50	(New Zealand) Chiefs	Suncorp Stadium, Brisbane
19:05	Tries: Sean Hardman, Berrick Barnes, Mark McLinden, Daniel Braid; Con: Berrick Barnes (2), Brendan McKibbon	Report	Tries: Sitiveni Sivivatu (2), Mils Muliaina (2), Stephen Donald, Dwayne Sweeney; Con: Stephen Donald (3), Mike Delany; Pen: Stephen Donald (4)	Attendance: 21,041; Referee: Ian Smith (Australia)

28 March 2009	Sharks (South Africa)	35–14	(Australia) Brumbies	ABSA Stadium, Durban
17:00	Tries: JP Pietersen, Stefan Terblanche, Rory Kockott, Jacques Botes, Ryan Kankowski; Con: Rory Kockott (5)	Report	Tries: Christian Lealiifano, Salesi Ma'afu; Con: Mark Gerrard (2)	Attendance: 39,148; Referee: Bryce Lawrence (New Zealand)

28 March 2009	Lions (South Africa)	32–38	(New Zealand) Hurricanes	Coca Cola Park, Johannesburg
19:10	Tries: Jaque Fourie (2), Todd Clever, Shandre Frolick; Con: André Pretorius (3); Pen: André Pretorius (2)	Report	Tries: Conrad Smith (2), Alby Mathewson, Ma'a Nonu, Willie Ripia; Con: Piri Weepu (5); Pen: Piri Weepu (2)	Attendance: 14,250; Referee: Jonathan Kaplan (South Africa)

=== Round 8 ===
3 April 2009	Crusaders (New Zealand)	16–13	(South Africa) Bulls	AMI Stadium, Christchurch
19:35	Tries: Isaac Ross; Con: Stephen Brett; Pen: Stephen Brett (3)	Report	Tries: Akona Ndungane (2); Pen: Morné Steyn	Attendance: 18,127; Referee: Craig Joubert (South Africa)

3 April 2009	Western Force (Australia)	39–7	(Australia) Reds	Subiaco Oval, Perth
19:05	Tries: James O'Connor, Drew Mitchell, Tamaiti Horua, Ryan Cross, Haig Sare; Con: Matt Giteau (3), James O'Connor; Pen: Matt Giteau (2)	Report	Tries: Blair Connor; Con: Brendan McKibbon	Attendance: 15,724; Referee: Stuart Dickinson (Australia)

4 April 2009	Chiefs (New Zealand)	36–29	(South Africa) Lions	Waikato Stadium, Hamilton
19:35	Tries: Dwayne Sweeney (3), Jackson Willison, Hika Elliot; Con: Stephen Donald (4); Pen: Stephen Donald	Report	Tries: Jaque Fourie (2), Jano Vermaak, Earl Rose; Con: André Pretorius (3); Drop: André Pretorius	Attendance: 16,750; Referee: Paul Marks (Australia)

4 April 2009	Waratahs (Australia)	12–6	(South Africa) Stormers	Sydney Football Stadium, Sydney
19:40	Tries: Lachlan Turner (2); Con: Daniel Halangahu	Report	Pen: Peter Grant (2)	Attendance: 21,928; Referee: Bryce Lawrence (New Zealand)

4 April 2009	Cheetahs (South Africa)	27–40	(Australia) Brumbies	Vodacom Park, Bloemfontein
15:00	Tries: Jongi Nokwe, Danwel Demas, Wayne van Heerden; Con: Jacques Louis Potgieter (3); Pen: Jacques Louis Potgieter (2)	Report	Tries: Christian Lealiifano, Mark Gerrard, Peter Kimlin, Josh Holmes; Con: Stirling Mortlock (3); Pen: Stirling Mortlock (2); Drop: Christian Lealiifano, Mark Gerrard	Attendance: 11,258; Referee: Matt Goddard (Australia)

4 April 2009	Sharks (South Africa)	33–17	(New Zealand) Hurricanes	ABSA Stadium, Durban
17:05	Tries: Luzuko Vulindlu, François Steyn, Chris Jordaan; Con: Rory Kockott (3); Pen: Rory Kockott (3), François Steyn	Report	Tries: Faifili Levave, Zac Guildford; Con: Piri Weepu (2); Pen: Piri Weepu	Attendance: 35,174; Referee: Marius Jonker (South Africa)

=== Round 9 ===
10 April 2009	Blues (New Zealand)	36–12	(South Africa) Lions	Eden Park, Auckland
19:35	Tries: Rudi Wulf (2), Chris Smylie, Anthony Tuitavake, Joe Rokocoko, Peter Saili; Con: Isaia Toeava (3)	Report	Tries: Henno Mentz, Jano Vermaak; Con: André Pretorius	Attendance: 17,000; Referee: James Leckie (Australia)

10 April 2009	Western Force (Australia)	27–28	(New Zealand) Hurricanes	Subiaco Oval, Perth
17:40	Tries: Nick Cummins (2), Scott Staniforth, Ryan Cross; Con: Matt Giteau (2); Pen: Matt Giteau	Report	Tries: Zac Guildford, David Smith, Cory Jane; Con: Willie Ripia (2); Pen: Willie Ripia (3)	Attendance: 20,737; Referee: Stuart Dickinson (Australia)

11 April 2009	Highlanders (New Zealand)	24–19	(Australia) Reds	Rugby Park, Invercargill
17:30	Tries: Josh Bekhuis, Kendrick Lynn, George Naoupu; Con: Matt Berquist (3); Pen: Matt Berquist	Report	Tries: Quade Cooper, Hugh McMeniman, Digby Ioane; Con: Brendan McKibbin (2)	Attendance: 9,950; Referee: Craig Joubert (South Africa)

11 April 2009	Brumbies (Australia)	17–10	(South Africa) Stormers	Canberra Stadium, Canberra
17:35	Tries: Patrick Phibbs; Pen: Mark Gerrard (4)	Report	Tries: Jean de Villiers; Con: Peter Grant; Pen: Peter Grant	Attendance: 14,565; Referee: Paul Marks (Australia)

11 April 2009	Waratahs (Australia)	6–20	(South Africa) Bulls	Sydney Football Stadium, Sydney
19:40	Pen: Daniel Halangahu, Kurtley Beale	Report	Tries: Bryan Habana, Werner Kruger; Con: Morné Steyn (2); Pen: Morné Steyn; Drop: Morné Steyn	Attendance: 21,208; Referee: Jonathan Kaplan (South Africa)

11 April 2009	Cheetahs (South Africa)	31–6	(South Africa) Sharks	Vodacom Park, Bloemfontein
15:00	Tries: Jongi Nokwe (2), Bjorn Basson, Kabamba Floors; Con: Jacques Louis Potgieter (3), Tewus De Bruyn; Pen: Jacques Louis Potgieter	Report	Pen: Rory Kockott (2)	Attendance: 14,470; Referee: Nathan Pearce (Australia)

=== Round 10 ===
17 April 2009	Blues (New Zealand)	26–6	(New Zealand) Highlanders	Eden Park, Auckland
19:35	Tries: Isaia Toeava, Jimmy Gopperth, Taniela Moa, Joe Rokocoko; Con: Jimmy Gopperth (3)	Report	Pen: Matt Berquist (2)	Attendance: 17,193; Referee: Stuart Dickinson (Australia)

17 April 2009	Brumbies (Australia)	32–31	(South Africa) Bulls	Canberra Stadium, Canberra
19:40	Tries: Mitchell Chapman, Stephen Hoiles, Peter Kimlin, Christian Lealiifano; Con: Stirling Mortlock (3); Pen: Stirling Mortlock (2)	Report	Tries: Bryan Habana, Zane Kirchner, Wynand Olivier, Pierre Spies; Con Morné Steyn (4); Pen: Morné Steyn	Attendance: 14,021; Referee: Chris Pollock (New Zealand)

18 April 2009	Hurricanes (New Zealand)	34–11	(South Africa) Stormers	Westpac Stadium, Wellington
17:30	Tries: Jeremy Thrush, Tamati Ellison, Ma'a Nonu (2); Con: Willie Ripia (4); Pen: Willie Ripia (2)	Report	Tries: Dylan des Fountain; Pen: Peter Grant (2)	Attendance: 20,673; Referee: Jonathan Kaplan (South Africa)

18 April 2009	Reds (Australia)	20–31	(South Africa) Lions	Suncorp Stadium, Brisbane
17:35	Tries: Will Genia, Scott Higginbotham, Quade Cooper; Con: Berrick Barnes; Pen: Berrick Barnes	Report	Tries: Henno Mentz (3), Ernst Joubert; Con: André Pretorius (4); Pen: André Pretorius	Attendance: 15,597; Referee: Keith Brown (New Zealand)

18 April 2009	Waratahs (Australia)	14–15	(Australia) Western Force	Sydney Football Stadium, Sydney
19:40	Tries: Will Caldwell; Pen: Daniel Halangahu (3)	Report	Tries: Cameron Shepherd, Scott Staniforth; Con: Matt Giteau; Pen: Matt Giteau	Attendance: 22,317; Referee: James Leckie (Australia)

18 April 2009	Cheetahs (South Africa)	10–28	(New Zealand) Chiefs	ABSA Park, Kimberley
15:00	Tries: Jongi Nokwe; Con: Jacques-Louis Potgieter; Pen: Jacques-Louis Potgieter	Report	Tries: Hika Elliot, Serge Lilo, Mike Delany; Con: Stephen Donald (2); Pen: Stephen Donald (3)	Attendance: 5,000; Referee: Nathan Pearce (Australia)

18 April 2009	Sharks (South Africa)	10–13	(New Zealand) Crusaders	ABSA Stadium, Durban
17:05	Tries: Steven Sykes; Con: Rory Kockott; Pen: Rory Kockott	Report	Tries: Richie McCaw; Con: Stephen Brett; Pen: Stephen Brett; Drop: Andrew Ellis	Attendance: 35,193; Referee: Mark Lawrence (South Africa)

=== Round 11 ===
24 April 2009	Highlanders (New Zealand)	11–18	(South Africa) Stormers	Carisbrook, Dunedin
19:35	Tries: Ben Smith; Pen: Matthew Berquist	Report	Tries: Sireli Naqelevuki, Peter Grant; Con: Willem de Waal (1/2); Pen: Willem de Waal (2)	Referee: Matt Goddard (Australia)

24 April 2009	Western Force (Australia)	55–14	(South Africa) Lions	Subiaco Oval, Perth
19:35	Tries: Penalty try (2), Cameron Shepherd (2), Drew Mitchell, Matt Giteau, James O'Connor, AJ Whalley; Con: Matt Giteau (6/8)	Report	Tries: Jannie Boshoff, Earl Rose; Con: André Pretorius (2/2)	Attendance: 15,801; Referee: Paul Marks (Australia)

25 April 2009	Blues (New Zealand)	24–31	(Australia) Reds	North Harbour Stadium, North Shore City
17:30	Tries: Isaia Toeava, Peter Saili, Kurtis Haiu, Jimmy Gopperth; Con: Jimmy Gopperth (2/4)	Report	Tries: Berrick Barnes, James Horwill, Digby Ioane, Charlie Fetoai; Con: Berrick Barnes (4/4); Pen: Berrick Barnes	Referee: Vinny Munro (New Zealand)

25 April 2009	Hurricanes (New Zealand)	56–7	(Australia) Brumbies	Westpac Stadium, Wellington
19:35	Tries: Zac Guildford (2), Cory Jane, Conrad Smith, Tamati Ellison, David Smith, Victor Vito; Con: Willie Ripia (5/7); Pen: Willie Ripia (2)	Report	Tries: Ben Alexander; Con: Stirling Mortlock (1/1)	Attendance: 16,663; Referee: Bryce Lawrence (New Zealand)

25 April 2009	Cheetahs (South Africa)	20–13	(New Zealand) Crusaders	Vodacom Park, Bloemfontein
15:00	Tries: Jongi Nokwe, Hennie Daniller; Con: Naas Oliver (2/2); Pen: Naas Olliver (2)	Report	Tries: Kahn Fotuali'i; Con: Stephen Brett (1/1); Pen: Stephen Brett	Attendance: 13,302; Referee: James Leckie (Australia)

25 April 2009	Bulls (South Africa)	33–27	(New Zealand) Chiefs	Loftus Versfeld, Pretoria
17:05	Tries: Derrick Kuun (2), Wynand Olivier; Con: Morné Steyn (3/3); Pen: Morné Steyn (3); Drop: Morné Steyn	Report	Tries: Sione Lauaki, Callum Bruce, Richard Kahui; Con: Stephen Donald (3/3); Pen: Stephen Donald (2)	Attendance: 28,187; Referee: Craig Joubert (South Africa)

=== Round 12 ===
1 May 2009	Hurricanes (New Zealand)	45–27	(New Zealand) Blues	Westpac Stadium, Wellington
19:35	Tries: Conrad Smith, Scott Waldrom, Tamati Ellison (2), Ma'a Nonu (2); Con: Willie Ripia (6); Pen: Willie Ripia	Report	Tries: Joe Rokocoko, Anthony Tuitavake, Rene Ranger, Dean Budd; Con: Jimmy Gopperth (2); Pen: Jimmy Gopperth	Attendance: 20,162; Referee: Chris Pollock (New Zealand)

1 May 2009	Lions (South Africa)	20–32	(New Zealand) Crusaders	Coca-Cola Park, Johannesburg
15:00	Tries: Jano Vermaak, Cobus Grobbelaar, Anton van Zyl; Con: André Pretorius; Pen: André Pretorius	Report	Tries: Isaac Ross, Stephen Brett, Brad Thorn, Daniel Perrin; Con: Leon MacDonald (3); Pen: Leon MacDonald (2)	Attendance: 16,500; Referee: Jonathan Kaplan (South Africa)

1 May 2009	Cheetahs (South Africa)	10–18	(Australia) Waratahs	Vodacom Park, Bloemfontein
17:05	Tries: JW Jonker; Con: Naas Olivier; Pen: Naas Olivier	Report	Tries: Lachlan Turner, Luke Burgess; Con: Daniel Halangahu; Pen: Daniel Halangahu (2)	Attendance: 15,309; Referee: Marius Jonker (South Africa)

2 May 2009	Reds (Australia)	13–52	(Australia) Brumbies	Suncorp Stadium, Brisbane
19:40	Tries: Will Genia (2); Pen: Quade Cooper	Report	Tries: Gene Fairbanks, Stephen Hoiles (2), Peter Kimlin, Ben Alexander, Adam Ashley-Cooper, Francis Fainifo; Con: Stirling Mortlock (7); Pen: Stirling Mortlock	Attendance: 19,346; Referee: Ian Smith (Australia)

2 May 2009	Sharks (South Africa)	23–15	(New Zealand) Highlanders	ABSA Stadium, Durban
15:00	Tries: Steven Sykes, Jacques Botes; Con: Rory Kockott (2); Pen: Rory Kockott (3)	Report	Tries: Jason Rutledge, Jimmy Cowan; Con: Matthew Berquist; Pen: Matthew Berquist	Attendance: 24,111; Referee: Phillip Bosch (South Africa)

2 May 2009	Bulls (South Africa)	32–29	(Australia) Western Force	Loftus Versfeld, Pretoria
17:05	Tries: Bryan Habana, Werner Kruger, Zane Kirchner; Con: Morné Steyn; Pen: Morné Steyn (4), Burton Francis	Report	Tries: Drew Mitchell, Cameron Shepherd, Josh Tatupu, Ryan Cross; Con: Matt Giteau (3); Pen: Matt Giteau	Attendance: 24,214; Referee: Stuart Dickinson (Australia)

2 May 2009	Stormers (South Africa)	14–28	(New Zealand) Chiefs	Newlands, Cape Town
19:10	Tries: Willem de Waal, Sireli Naqelevuki; Con: Willem de Waal, Peter Grant	Report	Tries: Liam Messam, Toby Morland (2), Richard Kahui; Con: Stephen Donald (3), Mike Delany	Attendance: 25,000; Referee: James Leckie (Australia)

=== Round 13 ===
8 May 2009	Crusaders (New Zealand)	32–12	(Australia) Reds	AMI Stadium, Christchurch
19:35	Tries: Thomas Waldrom, Owen Franks, Tim Bateman, Jason Macdonald, Sean Maitland; Con: Leon MacDonald (2); Pen: Leon MacDonald	Report	Tries: Ben Tapuai, Greg Holmes; Con: Quade Cooper	Attendance: 10,500; Referee: Chris Pollock (New Zealand)

8 May 2009	Lions (South Africa)	27–22	(New Zealand) Highlanders	Coca-Cola Park, Johannesburg
19:10	Tries: Michael Killian, Willem Alberts, Jano Vermaak, Earl Rose; Con: André Pretorius (2); Drop: André Pretorius	Report	Tries: Alando Soakai, Ben Smith, Jimmy Cowan; Con: Israel Dagg (2); Pen: Israel Dagg	Attendance: 4,500; Referee: Jaco Peyper (South Africa)

9 May 2009	Chiefs (New Zealand)	16–8	(New Zealand) Hurricanes	Waikato Stadium, Hamilton
19:35	Tries: Stephen Donald; Con: Stephen Donald; Pen: Stephen Donald (3)	Report	Tries: David Smith; Pen: Willie Ripia	Attendance: 25,000; Referee: Bryce Lawrence (New Zealand)

9 May 2009	Brumbies (Australia)	37–15	(New Zealand) Blues	Canberra Stadium, Canberra
19:40	Tries: Patrick Phibbs, Stirling Mortlock, Francis Fainifo, Huia Edmonds, Sitaleki Timani; Con: Stirling Mortlock (2), Matt To'omua; Drop: Matt To'omua	Report	Tries: Jimmy Gopperth, Joe Rokocoko; Con: Jimmy Gopperth; Pen: Jimmy Gopperth	Attendance: 16,177; Referee: Matt Goddard (Australia)

9 May 2009	Sharks (South Africa)	12–16	(Australia) Waratahs	ABSA Stadium, Durban
15:00	Pen: Ruan Pienaar (4)	Report	Tries: Timana Tahu, Peter Playford; Con: Daniel Halangahu	Attendance: 21,649; Referee: Mark Lawrence (South Africa)

9 May 2009	Bulls (South Africa)	29–20	(South Africa) Cheetahs	Loftus Versfeld, Pretoria
17:05	Tries: Akona Ndungane (2), Chiliboy Ralepelle, Bryan Habana; Con: Morné Steyn (3); Pen: Morné Steyn	Report	Tries: Tewis de Bruyn, Hendro Scholtz, Jongi Nokwe; Con: Naas Olivier; Pen: Naas Olivier	Attendance: 37,550; Referee: Stuart Dickinson (Australia)

9 May 2009	Stormers (South Africa)	25–24	(Australia) Western Force	Newlands Stadium, Cape Town
19:10	Tries: Joe Pietersen (2), Willem de Waal; Con: Willem de Waal; Pen: Willem de Waal (2)	Report	Tries: James O'Connor, Matt Giteau (2); Con: Matt Giteau (3); Pen: Matt Giteau	Attendance: 24,340; Referee: Marius Jonker (South Africa)

=== Round 14 ===
15 May 2009	Chiefs (New Zealand)	10–7	(Australia) Brumbies	Waikato Stadium, Hamilton
17:05	Tries: Stephen Donald; Con: Stephen Donald; Pen: Stephen Donald	Report	Tries: Francis Fainifo; Con: Stirling Mortlock	Attendance: 17,058; Referee: Stuart Dickinson (Australia)

15 May 2009	Lions (South Africa)	33–38	(Australia) Waratahs	Coca-Cola Park, Johannesburg
19:10	Tries: Jano Vermaak (2), Willem Alberts; Con: André Pretorius (3); Pen: André Pretorius (2); Drop: André Pretorius (2)	Report	Tries: Lachlan Turner, Dean Mumm, Phil Waugh, Peter Playford, Tom Carter; Con: Daniel Halangahu (5); Pen: Daniel Halangahu	Attendance: 8,000; Referee: Marius Jonker (South Africa)

16 May 2009	Blues (New Zealand)	13–15	(New Zealand) Crusaders	Eden Park, Auckland
19:35	Tries: Isaia Toeava; Con: Jimmy Gopperth; Pen: Jimmy Gopperth (2)	Report	Pen: Leon MacDonald (4); Drop: Leon MacDonald	Attendance: 21,000; Referee: Bryce Lawrence (New Zealand)

16 May 2009	Reds (Australia)	28–37	(New Zealand) Hurricanes	Suncorp Stadium, Brisbane
19:40	Tries: Mark McLinden (2), Ben Lucas, Quade Cooper; Con: Berrick Barnes (4)	Report	Tries: Ma'a Nonu (2), Piri Weepu, Cory Jane, Jeremy Thrush; Con: William Ripia (3); Pen: William Ripia (2)	Attendance: 19,025; Referee: Jonathan Kaplan (South Africa)

16 May 2009	Western Force (Australia)	33–28	(New Zealand) Highlanders	Subiaco Oval, Perth
19:45	Tries: Scott Staniforth (2), Ryan Cross, Haig Sare; Con: Matt Giteau (2); Pen: Matt Giteau (3)	Report	Tries: Ben Smith (2), Tom Donnelly, Jimmy Cowan; Con: Daniel Bowden (4)	Attendance: 18,310; Referee: Nathan Pearce (Australia)

16 May 2009	Cheetahs (South Africa)	22–28	(South Africa) Stormers	Vodacom Park, Bloemfontein
16:00	Tries: Sarel Pretorius, Nico Breedt, David de Villiers; Con: Naas Olivier (2); Pen: Naas Olivier	Report	Tries: Joe Pietersen (2), Dylan des Fountain; Con: Willem de Waal (2); Pen: Willem de Waal (3)	Attendance: 18,049; Referee: Garratt Williamson (New Zealand)

16 May 2009	Sharks (South Africa)	26–27	(South Africa) Bulls	ABSA Stadium, Durban
18:05	Tries: Keegan Daniel, Odwa Ndungane, Steven Sykes, Ryan Kankowski; Con: Rory Kockott (2)	Report	Tries: Zane Kirchner, Akona Ndungane, Danie Rossouw; Con: Morné Steyn (2); Drop: Morné Steyn (2)	Attendance: 47,411; Referee: Craig Joubert (South Africa)

== Playoffs ==
=== Semi-finals ===
22 May 2009
19:35

Chiefs (New Zealand)	14–10	(New Zealand) Hurricanes
Tries: Sione Lauaki, Mils Muliaina; Con: Stephen Donald (2)	Report	Tries: Ma'a Nonu; Con: Piri Weepu; Pen: Piri Weepu

Waikato Stadium, Hamilton
Attendance: 25,000
Referee: Stuart Dickinson (Australia)

23 May 2009
15:00

Bulls (South Africa)	36–23	(New Zealand) Crusaders
Tries: Bryan Habana, Akona Ndungane, Pierre Spies; Con: Morné Steyn (3); Pen: Morné Steyn; Drop: Morné Steyn (4)	Report	Tries: Adam Whitelock, Kieran Read; Con: Leon MacDonald (2); Pen: MacDonald (2); Drop: Andrew Ellis

Loftus Versfeld Stadium, Pretoria
Attendance: 55,000
Referee: Bryce Lawrence (New Zealand)

=== Final ===
30 May 2009

Bulls (South Africa)	61–17	(New Zealand) Chiefs
Tries: Fourie Du Preez (2), Bryan Habana (2), Victor Matfield, Wynand Olivier, Pierre Spies, Danie Rossouw; Con: Morné Steyn (5), Burton Francis; Pen: Morné Steyn (2); Drop: Morné Steyn	(Report)	Tries: Lelia Masaga, Mils Muliaina; Con: Stephen Donald (2); Pen: Stephen Donald

Loftus Versfeld Stadium, Pretoria
Attendance: 55,000
Referee: Jonathan Kaplan (South Africa)

FB	15	Zane Kirchner
RW	14	Akona Ndungane
OC	13	Jaco Pretorius
IC	12	Wynand Olivier
LW	11	Bryan Habana
FH	10	Morné Steyn
SH	9	Fourie du Preez
N8	8	Pierre Spies
BF	7	Dewald Potgieter
OF	6	Deon Stegmann
RL	5	Victor Matfield (c)
LL	4	Bakkies Botha
TP	3	Werner Kruger
HK	2	Derick Kuun
LP	1	Gurthro Steenkamp
Substitutes:
HK	16	Chiliboy Ralepelle
PR	17	Rayno Gerber
N8	18	Danie Rossouw
FL	19	Pedrie Wannenburg
SH	20	Heini Adams
FH	21	Burton Francis
WG	22	Marius Delport
Coach:
(South Africa) Frans Ludeke

FB	15	Mils Muliaina (c)
RW	14	Lelia Masaga
CE	13	Richard Kahui
SF	12	Callum Bruce
LW	11	Dwayne Sweeney
FF	10	Stephen Donald
SH	9	Toby Morland
N8	8	Sione Lauaki
OF	7	Tanerau Latimer
BF	6	Liam Messam
RL	5	Kevin O'Neill
LL	4	Craig Clarke
TP	3	James McGougan
HK	2	Aled de Malmanche
LP	1	Sona Taumalolo
Substitutes:
HK	16	Hika Elliot
PR	17	Joe Savage
LK	18	Toby Lynn
FL	19	Serge Lilo
SH	20	David Bason
FH	21	Mike Delany
WG	22	Sosene Anesi
Coach:
(New Zealand) Ian Foster

Touch judges:
Craig Joubert (South Africa)
Cobus Wessels (South Africa)
Television match official:
Johann Meuwesen (South Africa)

This large win by the Bulls, is the highest winning score, and the highest winning margin ever in a Super 14 final.

== Player statistics ==
=== Leading try scorers ===
Top 10 try scorers
Pos	Name	Tries	Pld	Team
1	Ma'a Nonu	9	14	Hurricanes
2	Bryan Habana	8	11	Bulls
3=	Cameron Shepherd	7	8	Western Force
3=	Joe Rokocoko	7	10	Blues
3=	Jano Vermaak	7	13	Lions
3=	Isaia Toeava	7	13	Blues
3=	Pierre Spies	7	15	Bulls
8=	JP Pietersen	6	10	Sharks
8=	Henno Mentz	6	11	Lions
8=	Sitiveni Sivivatu	6	8	Chiefs
8=	Tamati Ellison	6	11	Hurricanes
8=	Anthony Tuitavake	6	11	Blues

=== Leading point scorers ===
Top 10 overall point scorers
Pos	Name	Points	Pld	Team
1	Morné Steyn	189 (1T, 32C, 29P, 11DG)	15	Bulls
2	Stephen Donald	141 (3T, 39C, 16P)	15	Chiefs
3	Matt Giteau	115 (3T, 26C, 15P, 1DG)	12	Western Force
4	Rory Kockott	110 (2T, 23C, 17P, 1DG)	11	Sharks
5	Jimmy Gopperth	104 (4T, 24C, 12P)	11	Blues
6	André Pretorius	95 (22C, 11P, 6DG)	10	Lions
7	Stirling Mortlock	81 (3T, 24C, 6P)	12	Brumbies
8	Mark Gerrard	74 (3T, 10C, 20P)	10	Brumbies
9	Peter Grant	67 (2T, 12C, 11P)	10	Stormers
10	Willie Ripia	65 (1T, 18C, 8P)	7	Hurricanes

== Attendances ==
Team	Main Stadium	Capacity	Total Attendance	Average Attendance	% Capacity
(New Zealand) Blues	Eden Park	50,000			
(New Zealand) Chiefs	Waikato Stadium	25,800			
(New Zealand) Hurricanes	Westpac Stadium	34,500	104,472	14,924	44%
(New Zealand) Crusaders	Jade Stadium	36,500	95,977	15,996	43%
(New Zealand) Highlanders	Carisbrook	29,000			
(Australia) Reds	Suncorp Stadium	52,500	111,886	18,647	35%
(Australia) Brumbies	Canberra Stadium	25,011			
(Australia) Western Force	Subiaco Oval	43,500			
(Australia) Waratahs	Sydney Football Stadium	44,000			
(South Africa) Sharks	ABSA Stadium	52,000	237,147	33,878	65%
(South Africa) Bulls	Loftus Versfeld	51,762			
(South Africa) Lions	Ellis Park	62,567			
(South Africa) Cheetahs	Free State Stadium	46,000	77,388	12,898	32%
(South Africa) Stormers	Newlands Stadium	51,900			
