= 2008 IRB Pacific Nations Cup =

Rugby union tournament

Tournament details
- Countries: Australia A Fiji; Japan (Māori people) New Zealand Māori; Samoa; Tonga
- Tournament format(s): Round-robin
- Date: 7 June - 5 July 2008

Tournament statistics
- Teams: 6
- Matches played: 15
- Attendance: 85,865 (5,724 per match)
- Tries scored: 92 (6.13 per match)
- Top point scorer(s): James Arlidge (Japan) (56 points)
- Top try scorer(s): Stephen Hoiles (Australia A) (5 tries)

Final
- Champions: (Māori people) New Zealand Māori (1st title)
- Runners-up: Australia A

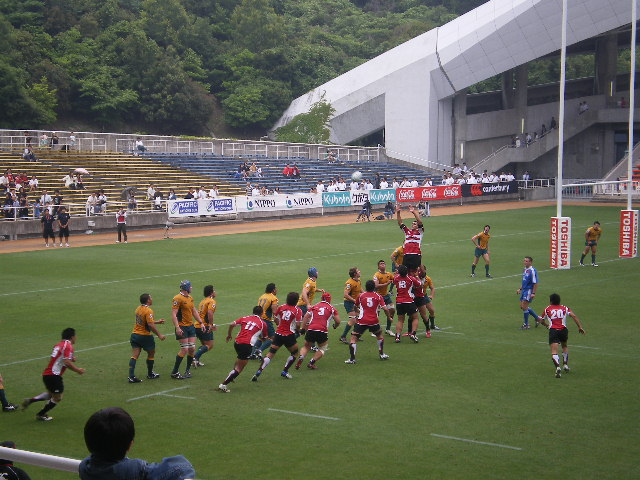
Japan v Australia A (Round One, June 8, 2008, Level-5 Stadium, Fukuoka, Japan)

The 2008 Pacific Nations Cup was a rugby union tournament held between six national sides on the Pacific Rim: Australia A, Fiji, Japan, Samoa, Tonga and New Zealand Māori (just for this year). The inaugural competition was held in 2006. This year the tournament started on 7 June and ended on 6 July 2008.

The tournament is a round-robin where each team plays all of the other teams once. There are four points for a win, two for a draw and none for a defeat. There are also bonus points offered with one bonus point for scoring four or more tries in a match and one bonus point for losing by 7 points or less.

== Table ==
2008 IRB Pacific Nations Cup
	Team	Played	Won	Drawn	Lost	Points For	Points Against	Points Difference	Tries For	Tries Against	Try Bonus	Losing Bonus	Points
1	(Māori people) New Zealand Māori	5	5	0	0	134	62	+72	18	6	1	0	21
2	Australia A	5	4	0	1	220	77	+143	31	10	3	1	20
3	Samoa	5	2	0	3	95	117	-22	12	13	1	1	10
4	Fiji	5	2	0	3	94	117	-23	12	15	1	1	10
5	Japan	5	1	0	4	121	181	-60	13	25	2	1	7
6	Tonga	5	1	0	4	71	181	-110	6	23	1	1	6
Source : irb.com Points breakdown: *4 points for a win *2 points for a draw *1 bonus point for a loss by seven points or less *1 bonus point for scoring four or more tries in a match

== Schedule ==
=== Round 1 ===
7 June 2008
14:05 (UTC+12)

Fiji	34 – 17	Samoa
Try: Rauluni 15' m Nagusa (2) 26' c, 61' m T. Rawaqa 42' c I. Rawaqa 46' c Con: T. Rawaqa (3/5); Pen: T. Rawaqa 71'	Report	Try: Fa'afili 65' m Lemi 68' m Sititi 78' c Con: Sasulu (1/3)

Churchill Park, Lautoka
Attendance: 10,000
Referee: Keith Brown (New Zealand)

7 June 2008
16:35 NZST (UTC+12)

New Zealand Māori (Māori people)	20 – 9	Tonga
Try: T. Ellison 49' c Weepu 72' c Con: Bruce (2/2); Pen: Bruce (2) 26', 55'	Report	Pen: Apikotoa (3) 29', 53', 63'

North Harbour Stadium, Albany
Attendance: 4,600
Referee: Paul Marks (Australia)

8 June 2008
14:00 JST (UTC+09)

Japan	21 – 42	Australia A
Try: Taniguchi (2) 61' m, 64' c Con: Arlidge (1/2); Pen: Arlidge (2) 42', 48'; Drop: Arlidge 6'	Report	Try: Turinui 13' c Gerrard 19' c Kimlin (2) 34' c, 70' c Humphries 40' c Norton-Knight 44' c Con: Gerrard (6/6)

Level-5 Stadium, Fukuoka
Attendance: 7,493
Referee: Willie Roos (South Africa)

=== Round 2 ===
14 June 2008
15:05 (UTC+12)

Fiji	7 – 11	(Māori people) New Zealand Māori
Try: Naqelevuki 36' c Con: T. Rawaqa	Report	Try: Eaton 49' m Pen: T. Ellison 12'; Bruce 77'

Churchill Park, Lautoka
Attendance: 12,000
Referee: Matt Goddard (Australia)

14 June 2008
15:05 (UTC-11)

Samoa	15 – 20	Australia A
Try: Tafunai 43' m Salanoa 79' c Con: Mai (1/2); Pen: Sasulu 33'	Report	Try: Tahu 11' c Turinui 67' c Con: Gerrard (1/1); Carraro (1/1); Pen: Gerrard 23'; Carraro 74'

Apia Park, Samoa
Referee: Keith Brown (New Zealand)

15 June 2008
14:05 JST (UTC+09)

Japan	35 – 13	Tonga
Try: Kikutani 46' m Onozawa 55' m Webb 59' m Robins 79' m Pen: Arlidge (5) 4', 26', 31', 39', 43'	Report	Try: Filipine 50' c Con: Hola (1/1); Pen: Hola (2) 3', 6'

Yurtec Stadium Sendai, Miyagi
Attendance: 6,304
Referee: Willie Roos (South Africa)

=== Round 3 ===
21 June 2008
16:35 NZST (UTC+12)

Māori	17 – 6	Samoa
Try: Bruce 30' c Weepu 40' c Con: Bruce (2/2); Pen: Bruce 13'	Report	Pen: G. Williams (2) 47', 66'

Waikato Stadium, Waikato
Referee: Ian Smith (Australia)

22 June 2008
14:05 AEST (UTC+10)

Australia A	90 – 7	Tonga
Try: Ioane (2) 6' m, 40' c Turinui 8' m Hoiles (4) 14' c, 34' c, 38' m, 44' c Tahu 39' c Norton-Knight (2) 55' c, 61' c Mitchell (2) 66' m, 70' c Phibbs 68' c Turner 77' c Con: Carraro (4); Sheehan; Norton-Knight (2); Halangahu (3)	Report	Try: Ma'asi 52' c Con: Lilo

North Sydney Oval, Sydney
Attendance: 6,817
Referee: Paul Honiss (New Zealand)

22 June 2008
14:10 JST (UTC+09)

Japan	12 – 24	Fiji
Pen: Arlidge (4) 5', 14', 34', 54'	Report	Try: Naqelevuki 50' c T. Rawaqa 56' c Goneva 78' c Con: T. Rawaqa (3/3); Pen: T. Rawaqa 11'

Olympic Stadium, Tokyo
Attendance: 10,994
Referee: Kelvin Deaker (New Zealand)

=== Round 4 ===
28 June 2008
13:35 (UTC+13)

Tonga	15 – 20	Samoa
Pen: Hola (3) 3', 9', 27'; Lilo (2) 50', 67'	Report	Try: Mai 34' c Lemi 63' c Con: G. Williams (2/2); Pen: G. Williams (2) 74', 75'

Teufaiva Stadium, Nukuʻalofa
Attendance: 4,000
Referee: Ian Smith (Australia)

28 June 2008
14:35 NZST (UTC+12)

Māori	65 – 22	Japan
Try: Lawrence (2) 8' m, 67' c Bruce (2) 12' c, 76' m T. Ellison 34' m Gear (3) 48' c, 55' c, 63' c Sweeney 60' c Kawau 80+2' m Con: Bruce (6); Pen: Bruce (1) 41'	Report	Try: Robins 22' m Loamanu 27' c Thompson 40' c Con: Arlidge (2); Pen: Arlidge (1) 6'

McLean Park, Napier
Attendance: 4,950
Referee: Carlo Damasco (Italy)

29 June 2008
14:05 AEST (UTC+10)

Australia A	50 – 13	Fiji
Try: Ioane 2' c Turner (2) 27'c, 64' m Lucas 33' c Mitchell 39' c Turinui 45' c Hoiles 75' c Con: Halangahu (6); Pen: Halangahu 23'	Report	Try: Dewes 50' m Ratuvou 80' m Pen: T. Rawaqa 5'

Ballymore Stadium, Brisbane
Referee: Jonathon White (New Zealand)

=== Round 5 ===
5 July 2008
12:10 (UTC+13)

Tonga	27 – 16	Fiji
Try: Taufaka 23' c Kiole 63' m Langilangi 78' c Taione 80+2' m Con: Hola (1); Apikotoa (1); Pen: Lilo (1) 60'	Report	Try: Radidi 25' c Con: T. Rawaqa; Pen: T. Rawaqa (3) 11', 38', 71'

Teufaiva Stadium, Nukuʻalofa
Attendance: 3,000
Referee: Carlo Damasco (Italy)

5 July 2008
15:05 (UTC-11)

Samoa	37 – 31	Japan
Try: Sititi 4' c Tafunai 7' c Tea 42' m H. Tuilagi 52' c J. Johnston 77' m Con: G. Williams (3); Pen: G. Williams (2) 32', 72'	Report	Try: Holani 17' c Webb 41' c Onozawa 63' c Kikutani 75' c Con: Arlidge (4); Pen: Arlidge (1) 21'

Apia Park, Apia
Attendance: 7,000
Referee: Steve Walsh (New Zealand)

5 July 2008
14:05 AEST (UTC+10)

Australia A	18 – 21	Māori
Try: Tahu (2) 8' c, 60' m Con: Halangahu (1); Pen: Gerrard (2) 44', 50'	Report	Try: Latimer 26' c Messam 39' c Waldrom 77' c Con: Weepu (3)

Sydney Football Stadium, Sydney
Attendance: 8,707
Referee: James Bolabiu (Fiji)

== Top scorers ==
=== Top points scorers ===
Rank	Player	Team	Points
1	James Arlidge	Japan	56
2	Callum Bruce	Māori	50
3	Taniela Maravunwasawasa	Fiji	44
4	Mark Gerrard	Australia A	28
4	Gavin Williams	Samoa	28
6	Stephen Hoiles	Australia A	25
7	Daniel Halangahu	Australia A	23
8	Timana Tahu	Australia A	20
8	Morgan Turinui	Australia A	20
10	Pierre Hola	Tonga	19
10	Sam Norton-Knight	Australia A	19

Source: irb.com

=== Top try scorers ===
Rank	Player	Team	Tries
1	Stephen Hoiles	Australia A	5
2	Timana Tahu	Australia A	4
2	Morgan Turinui	Australia A	4
4	Callum Bruce	Māori	3
4	Hosea Gear	Māori	3
4	Digby Ioane	Australia A	3
4	Drew Mitchell	Australia A	3
4	Sam Norton-Knight	Australia A	3
4	Lachlan Turner	Australia A	3
10	15 players		2
25	31 players		1

Source: irb.com

== See also ==
- 2008 IRB Nations Cup
