= 2009 Super 14 final =

Men's rugby union club competition

2009 Super 14 Final
Home Team	Bulls
Away Team	Chiefs
Result	Bulls 61 Chiefs 17
Date	30 May 2009
Stadium	Loftus Versfeld Stadium, Pretoria

The Final of the 2009 Super 14 season, a provincial rugby union competition in the Southern Hemisphere, took place on 30 May 2009 at Loftus Versfeld Stadium in Pretoria, South Africa. The Bulls won the match 61 points to 17 over the visiting Chiefs side, who are based in Hamilton, New Zealand. This large win by the Bulls, is highest winning score, and highest winning margin ever in the Super 14 competition.

== Road to the Final ==
2009 Super 14 table
Pos	Team	Pld	W	D	L	PF	PA	PD	B	Pts	Qualification
1	(South Africa) Bulls	13	10	0	3	338	271	+67	6	46	Advanced to the playoffs
2	(New Zealand) Chiefs	13	9	0	4	338	236	+102	9	45	Advanced to the playoffs
3	(New Zealand) Hurricanes	13	9	0	4	380	279	+101	8	44	Advanced to the playoffs
4	(New Zealand) Crusaders	13	8	1	4	231	198	+33	7	41	Advanced to the playoffs
5	(Australia) Waratahs	13	9	0	4	241	212	+29	5	41	
6	(South Africa) Sharks	13	8	0	5	282	239	+43	6	38	
7	(Australia) Brumbies	13	8	0	5	311	305	+6	6	38	
8	(Australia) Western Force	13	6	1	6	328	275	+53	10	36	
9	(New Zealand) Blues	13	5	0	8	339	369	−30	12	32	
10	(South Africa) Stormers	13	5	0	8	235	249	−14	7	27	
11	(New Zealand) Highlanders	13	4	0	9	254	269	−15	10	26	
12	(South Africa) Lions	13	4	0	9	294	419	−125	9	25	
13	(Australia) Reds	13	3	0	10	258	380	−122	7	19	
14	(South Africa) Cheetahs	13	2	0	11	213	341	−128	4	12	

Updated to match(es) played on 17 May 2009. Source:

Semi-finals
23 May 2009 – Loftus Versfeld Stadium, Pretoria
(South Africa) Bulls	36
(New Zealand) Crusaders	23
22 May 2009 – Waikato Stadium, Hamilton
(New Zealand) Chiefs	14
(New Zealand) Hurricanes	10

Final
30 May 2009 – Loftus Versfeld Stadium, Pretoria
(South Africa) Bulls	61
(New Zealand) Chiefs	17

== Match ==
=== First half ===
The Chiefs scored first but could not contain the bulls rampant attack ending the first half at 34–7

=== Second half ===
Again the Chiefs scored first through Mils Muliania, but the Bulls ran away with it with two tries to Bryan Habana 61–17

== Match details ==
30 May 2009

Bulls (South Africa)	61 – 17	(New Zealand) Chiefs
Tries: Fourie Du Preez (2), Bryan Habana (2), Victor Matfield, Wynand Olivier, Pierre Spies, Danie Rossouw; Con: Morné Steyn (5), Burton Francis; Pen: Morné Steyn (2); Drop: Morné Steyn	(Report)	Tries: Lelia Masaga, Mils Muliaina; Con: Stephen Donald (2); Pen: Stephen Donald

Loftus Versfeld Stadium, Pretoria
Attendance: 55,000
Referee: Jonathan Kaplan (South Africa)

Bulls	Chiefs

BULLS:
FB	15	Zane Kirchner
RW	14	Akona Ndungane
CT	13	Jaco Pretorius
SF	12	Wynand Olivier
LW	11	Bryan Habana
FF	10	Morné Steyn
HB	9	Fourie du Preez
N8	8	Pierre Spies
OF	7	Dewald Potgieter
BF	6	Deon Stegmann
RL	5	Victor Matfield
LL	4	Bakkies Botha
TP	3	Werner Kruger
HK	2	Derick Kuun
LP	1	Gurthro Steenkamp
Substitutes:
HK	16	Chiliboy Ralepelle
LP	17	Rayno Gerber
N8	18	Danie Rossouw
LF	19	Pedrie Wannenburg
HB	20	Heini Adams
FF	21	Burton Francis
RW	22	Marius Delport
Coach:
(South Africa) Frans Ludeke

CHIEFS:
FB	15	Mils Muliaina
RW	14	Lelia Masaga
CT	13	Richard Kahui
SF	12	Callum Bruce
LW	11	Dwayne Sweeney
FF	10	Stephen Donald
HB	9	Toby Morland
N8	8	Sione Lauaki
OF	7	Tanerau Latimer
BF	6	Liam Messam
RL	5	Kevin O'Neill
LL	4	Craig Clarke
TP	3	James McGougan
HK	2	Aled de Malmanche
LP	1	Sona Taumalolo
Substitutions:
HK	16	Hika Elliot
LP	17	Joe Savage
RL	18	Toby Lynn
LF	19	Serge Lilo
HB	20	David Bason
FF	21	Mike Delany
RW	22	Sosene Anesi
Coach:
(New Zealand) Ian Foster

Touch judges:
(South Africa) Craig Joubert
(South Africa) Cobus Wessels
Television match official:
(South Africa) Johann Meuwesen

Preceded by 2008 Super 14 Final	Super 14 Final; 2009	Succeeded by 2010 Super 14 Final
