= 2010 Super 14 final =

Men's rugby union club competition

2010 Super 14 Final
- Event: 2010 Super 14 season
Bulls	Stormers
(South Africa)	(South Africa)
25	17
- Date: 29 May 2010
- Venue: Orlando Stadium, Soweto
- Referee: Craig Joubert (South Africa)

The Final of the 2010 Super 14 season, a provincial rugby union competition in the Southern Hemisphere, took place on 29 May 2010 at Orlando Stadium in Soweto, South Africa. The Bulls, based in Pretoria, hosted the Stormers, from Cape Town, in the second all-South African final. The defending champion Bulls won 25–17 to claim their second consecutive title and third in four years. This was the last Super 14 final, as the Melbourne Rebels joined the Super Rugby competition in the 2011 season to create a new Super Rugby competition.

The Bulls' normal home, Loftus Versfeld, was unavailable because it was used as a venue for the 2010 FIFA World Cup being held in South Africa beginning 11 June. Under FIFA rules, all World Cup venues must be handed over to the local organisers no later than 15 days before the opening match of the competition. Orlando Stadium was the largest, suitable, stadium in the Bulls' home province of Gauteng that was not being used for the World Cup.

The game was surrounded in controversy after Schalk Burger claimed that the referee Craig Joubert was inconsistent at the breakdowns, "coaching the Bulls, but penalising the Stormers". This sparked an outcry over the handling of the game by Joubert, and internet blogs were buzzing due to the alleged incompetency of Joubert. André Watson, the head of South Africa's Rugby Referees, released a statement in which he defended Joubert's performance.

== Road to the Final ==
Pos	Team	Pld	W	D	L	PF	PA	PD	B	Pts	Qualification
1	(South Africa) Bulls	13	10	0	3	436	345	+91	7	47	Advance to playoffs
2	(South Africa) Stormers	13	9	0	4	365	171	+194	8	44	Advance to playoffs
3	(Australia) Waratahs	13	9	0	4	385	288	+97	7	43	Advance to playoffs
4	(New Zealand) Crusaders	13	8	1	4	388	295	+93	7	41	Advance to playoffs
5	(Australia) Reds	13	8	0	5	366	308	+58	7	39	
6	(Australia) Brumbies	13	8	0	5	358	291	+67	5	37	
7	(New Zealand) Blues	13	7	0	6	376	333	+43	9	37	
8	(New Zealand) Hurricanes	13	7	1	5	358	323	+35	7	37	
9	(South Africa) Sharks	13	7	0	6	297	299	−2	5	33	
10	(New Zealand) Chiefs	13	4	1	8	340	418	−78	8	26	
11	(South Africa) Cheetahs	13	5	1	7	315	393	−78	4	26	
12	(New Zealand) Highlanders	13	3	0	10	297	397	−100	7	19	
13	(Australia) Force	13	4	0	9	258	364	−106	3	19	
14	(South Africa) Lions	13	0	0	13	270	585	−315	5	5	

Semi-finals
22 May 2010 – Orlando Stadium, Soweto
(South Africa) Bulls	39
(New Zealand) Crusaders	24
22 May 2010 – Newlands, Cape Town
(South Africa) Stormers	25
(Australia) Waratahs	6

Final
29 May 2010 – Orlando Stadium, Soweto
(South Africa) Bulls	25
(South Africa) Stormers	17

== Match ==
=== Second half ===
The Stormers scored a try in the 77th minute of the game. This try was thought to have been awarded to Ricky Januarie. The television replays showed that in fact the ball was placed short of the try line, but Craig Joubert awarded the try without referring it to the television match official. SARU clarified the try in a press statement a few days later claiming that Januarie's attempt was short, but that the ball was picked up by replacement Pieter Louw who then scored the try.

== Match details ==
29 May 2010
17:05 SAST

Bulls (South Africa)	25–17	(South Africa) Stormers
Try: Hougaard 25' c Con: Steyn (1/1); Pen: Steyn (6/7) 9', 15', 20', 60', 71', 75'	Report	Try: Habana 53' c Louw 77' c Con: Grant (2/2); Pen: Grant (1/2) 30'

Orlando Stadium, Soweto
Referee: Craig Joubert (South Africa)

Bulls	Stormers

BULLS:
FB	15	Zane Kirchner
RW	14	Gerhard van den Heever
CT	13	Jaco Pretorius
SF	12	Wynand Olivier
LW	11	Francois Hougaard
FF	10	Morné Steyn
HB	9	Fourie du Preez
N8	8	Pierre Spies
OF	7	Dewald Potgieter
BF	6	Deon Stegmann
RL	5	Victor Matfield (Cpt)
LL	4	Danie Rossouw
TP	3	Werner Kruger
HK	2	Gary Botha
LP	1	Gurthrö Steenkamp
Substitutes:
HK	16	Bandise Maku
LP	17	Bees Roux
N8	18	Flip van der Merwe
LF	19	Derick Kuun
HB	20	Jacques-Louis Potgieter
FF	21	Jaco van der Westhuyzen
RW	22	Pedrie Wannenburg
Coach:
(South Africa) Frans Ludeke

STORMERS:
FB	15	Joe Pietersen
RW	14	Gio Aplon
CT	13	Jaque Fourie
CT	12	Juan de Jongh
LW	11	Bryan Habana
FH	10	Peter Grant
SH	9	Dewaldt Duvenhage
N8	8	Duane Vermeulen
OF	7	Francois Louw
BF	6	Schalk Burger (Cpt)
RL	5	Andries Bekker
LL	4	Adriaan Fondse
TP	3	Brok Harris
HK	2	Tiaan Liebenberg
LP	1	Wicus Blaauw
Substitutions:
HK	16	Deon Fourie
LP	17	JC Kritzinger
RL	18	Anton van Zyl
LF	19	Pieter Louw
SH	20	Ricky Januarie
FH	21	Willem de Waal
CT	22	Tim Whitehead
Coach:
(South Africa) Allister Coetzee

Touch judges:
(South Africa) Cobus Wessels
(South Africa) Christie du Preez
Television match official:
(South Africa) Shaun Veldsman

== Notes ==
Preceded by 2009 Super 14 Final	Super 14 Final; 2010	Succeeded by 2011 Super Rugby Final
