= Francois Louw =

South African rugby union player

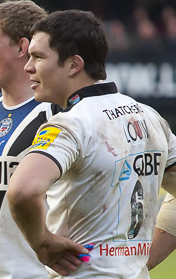
- Born: Louis-Francois Pickard Louw; 15 June 1985 (age 41) Cape Town, South Africa
- Height: 1.90 m (6 ft 3 in)
- Weight: 114 kg (251 lb; 17 st 13 lb)
- School: Bishops Diocesan College
- University: Stellenbosch University
- Notable relative: Jan Pickard (grandfather)

Rugby union career
- Position(s): Blindside Flanker, Number 8
- Current team: Bath
Senior career
Years	Team	Apps	(Points)
2011–2020	Bath Rugby	141	(85)
- Correct as of 16 June 2022
Provincial / State sides
Years	Team	Apps	(Points)
2006–2011	Western Province	65	(65)
- Correct as of 16 June 2022
Super Rugby
Years	Team	Apps	(Points)
2008–2011	Stormers	54	(20)
- Correct as of 16 June 2022
International career
Years	Team	Apps	(Points)
2010–2019	South Africa	76	(50)
2014–2015	Springboks (Note: Louw played for South Africa in two non-test matches against World XVs in Cape Town in 2014 and 2015.)	2	(0)
- Correct as of 16 June 2022

Francois Louw (born 15 June 1985) is a South African former professional rugby union player. A flanker, he played for Western Province, the Stormers and English club Bath. He won 76 international caps for South Africa, and was part of the team that won the 2019 Rugby World Cup.

== Early life ==
Louw was born in Cape Town and is the grandson of the former South African international Jan Pickard. He attended Bishops College in Cape Town and studied rugby at the University of Stellenbosch.

== Playing career ==
He represented the Stormers in Super Rugby, having made his debut during the 2008 season. He also played for Western Province in the Currie Cup. Louw was part of the Stormers team that lost the 2010 Super 14 Final to the Bulls.

On 12 July 2011 it was announced that Louw signed for Bath Rugby on a 3-year deal.

=== International ===
Following the Super 14 season, Louw made his debut for South Africa against Wales at the Millennium Stadium in Cardiff. He played the entire game as South Africa won 34–31. Louw was selected for South Africa's next match, against France at his home ground, Newlands Stadium in Cape Town. Louw scored the last of five tries, helping South Africa to a 42–17 victory. After taking part in South Africa's victorious two-match series against Italy, including a try in the first Test, Louw made his Tri Nations debut in July 2010. It was the first time Louw experienced defeat as a Springbok, with New Zealand winning the game 32–12.

He has become a mainstay in the Springbok side, becoming the first choice openside flank under the reign of Heyneke Meyer. He had the second most turnovers won at the 2015 Rugby World Cup with 13. He has also shown strong running and some skilful play. In 2013, against the All Blacks at Ellis Park, he made a strong run then an offload in the tackle to set up Bryan Habana for a try.

Louw was named in South Africa's squad for the 2019 Rugby World Cup. South Africa won the tournament, defeating England in the final.

== Statistics ==
=== Test Match Record ===
As of 23 November 2025

Against	P	W	D	L	Tri	Pts	%Won
Argentina	10	8	0	2	0	0	80
Australia	12	5	1	6	1	5	41.67
Canada	1	1	0	0	0	0	100
England	2	2	0	0	0	0	100
Fiji	1	1	0	0	0	0	100
France	4	4	0	0	1	5	100
Ireland	5	3	0	2	0	0	60
Italy	5	5	0	0	2	10	100
Japan	3	2	0	1	1	5	66.67
Namibia	2	2	0	0	1	5	100
New Zealand	17	1	1	15	0	0	5.88
Samoa	2	2	0	0	2	10	100
Scotland	4	4	0	0	0	0	100
United States	1	1	0	0	2	10	100
Wales	7	6	0	1	0	0	85.71
Total	76	47	2	27	10	50	61.84

Pld = Games Played, W = Games Won, D = Games Drawn, L = Games Lost, Tri = Tries Scored, Pts = Points Scored

=== International Tries ===
Try	Opposing team	Location	Venue	Competition	Date	Result	Score
1	France	Cape Town, South Africa	Newlands Stadium	2010 June rugby union tests	12 June 2010	Win	42–17
2	Italy	Witbank, South Africa	Witbank Stadium	2010 Italy tour of South Africa	19 June 2010	Win	29–13
3	Australia	Pretoria, South Africa	Loftus Versfeld Stadium	2012 Rugby Championship	29 September 2012	Win	31–8
4	Samoa	Pretoria, South Africa	Loftus Versfeld Stadium	2013 South African Quadrangular Tournament	22 June 2013	Win	56–23
5	Samoa	Pretoria, South Africa	Loftus Versfeld Stadium	2013 South African Quadrangular Tournament	22 June 2013	Win	56–23
6	Japan	Brighton, England	Falmer Stadium	2015 Rugby World Cup	19 September 2015	Loss	32–34
7	United States	London, England	London Stadium	2015 Rugby World Cup Pool B	7 October 2015	Win	64–0
8	United States	London, England	London Stadium	2015 Rugby World Cup Pool B	7 October 2015	Win	64–0
9	Italy	Padua, Italy	Stadio Euganeo	2017 end-of-year test	25 November 2017	Win	6–35
10	Namibia	Toyota, Japan	Toyota Stadium	2019 Rugby World Cup	28 September 2019	Win	57–3
