= Matthew Carraro =

Matt Carraro
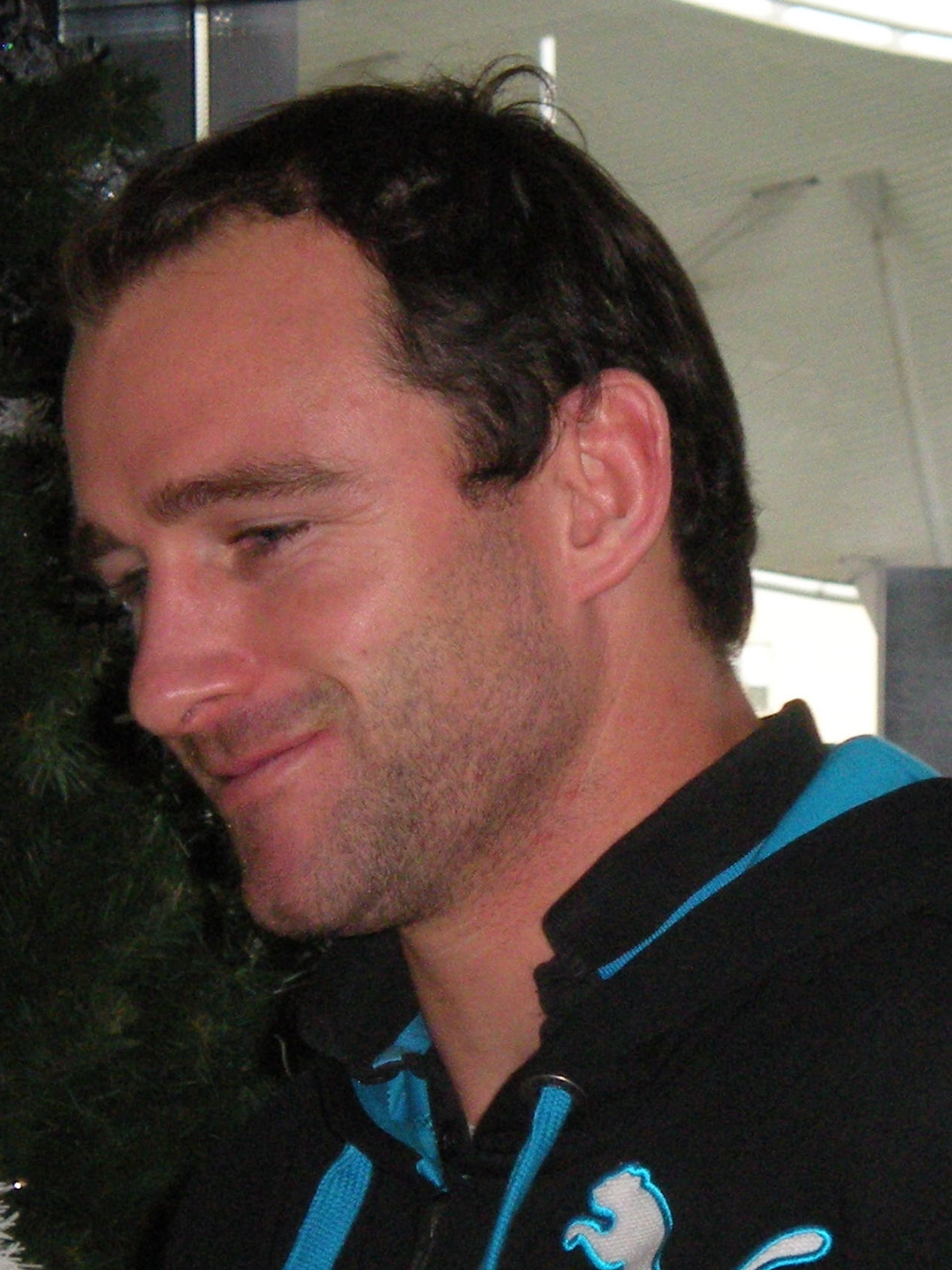
- Full name: Matthew Carraro
- Born: 4 August 1984 (age 42) Gosford, Sydney, Australia
- Height: 1.85 m (6 ft 1 in)
- Weight: 93 kg (14 st 9 lb; 205 lb)
- School: St Joseph's College, Hunters Hill

Rugby union career
- Position: Outside-Centre / Wing
Senior career
Years	Team	Apps	(Points)
2007	Brumbies	4	(0)
2007	Canberra Vikings	5	(32)
2008–2009	Waratahs	8	(0)
2009–2012	Bath	67	(80)
2012–2013	Montpellier	12	(5)
2014–2016	Waratahs	42	(35)
2014	NSW Country Eagles	3	(5)
2016	Toulon	8	(5)
- Correct as of 15 October 2016
International career
Years	Team	Apps	(Points)
2002	Australian Schools		
2008	Australia A	4	(5)
- Correct as of 6 July 2008

Matthew Carraro (born 4 August 1984) is an Australian former professional rugby union player. His usual positions were at centre or on the wing. Carraro played for the Waratahs and Brumbies in Super Rugby, as well as for Bath in England, and Montpellier and Toulon in France.

== Family and early life ==
Matthew Carraro was born in Gosford, New South Wales. He is the nephew of former Avoca and Manly player at tighthead prop David Carraro. He attended St Joseph's College, Hunters Hill and was selected for the Australian Schools team in 2002.

Carraro is married and has two children (a son and a daughter) with his wife Nardia.

== Career ==
After signing a rookie contract with the Brumbies for one season, he joined the Waratahs in 2008. Carraro was selected for the Australia A team to play in the 2008 Pacific Nations Cup.

He joined Bath Rugby in 2009, signing a two-year extension in summer 2011. In March 2012, he confirmed that he would be leaving Bath for Montpellier at the end of the season.

Carraro returned to the Waratahs for the 2014 Super Rugby season. He played in Sydney until the end of the 2016 Super Rugby season. His season for the Waratahs was such a success, he was nicknamed "Mr fix-it" for revitalising the Waratahs wing.

He joined with French club Toulon as a replacement for the injured Ayumu Goromaru for the 2016–17 Top 14 season but was then signed on to a full season contract, for what was his last season of professional rugby.

Following his retirement from the top level of the game, Carraro pursued his teaching career in physical education at St John’s Nowra on the NSW south coast.
