= Blair Connor =

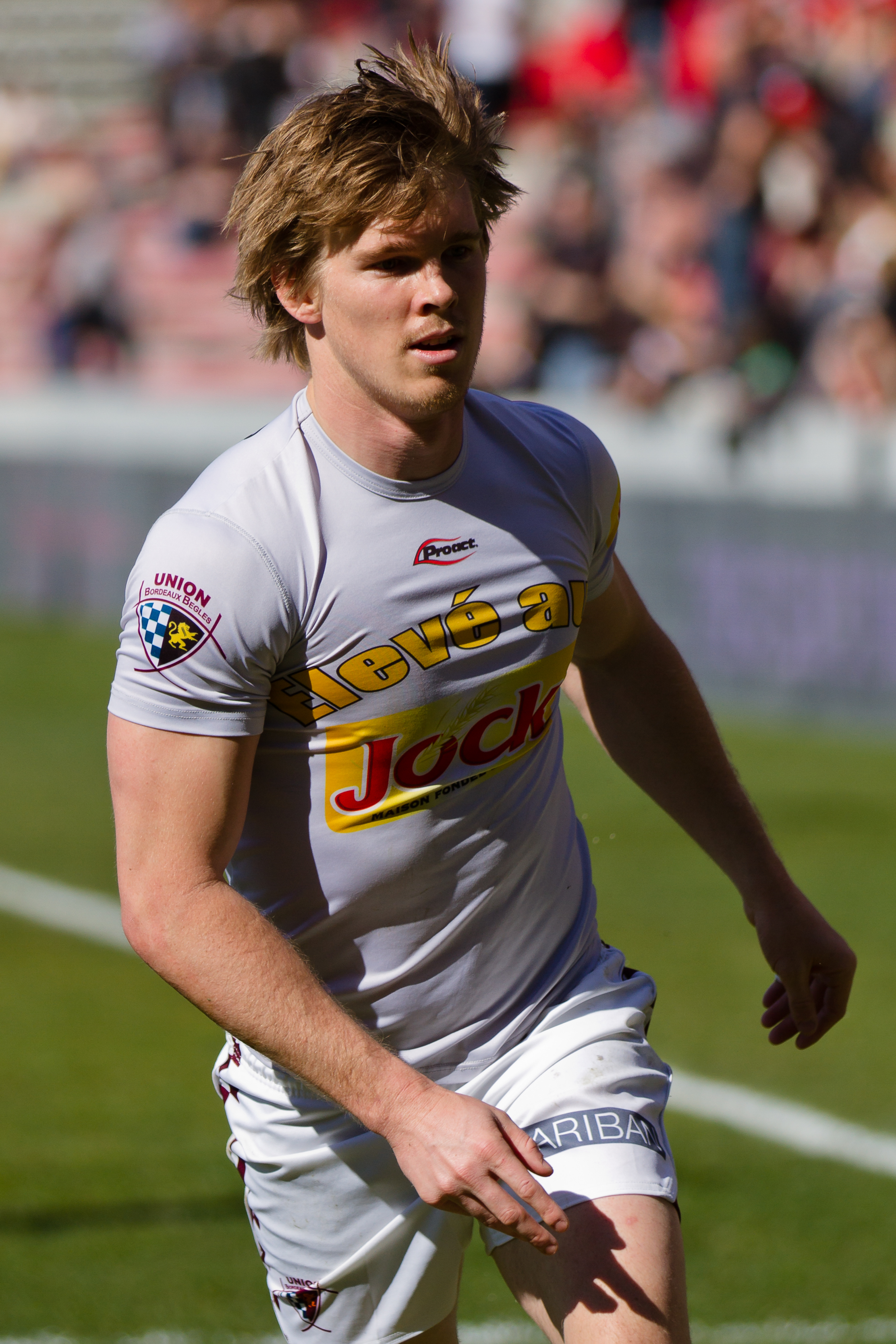
- Born: Blair Connor; 29 September 1988 (age 38) Brisbane, Australia
- Height: 183 cm (6 ft 0 in)
- Weight: 82 kg (12 st 13 lb; 181 lb)
- School: St. Joseph's Nudgee College

Rugby union career
- Position: Wing / Centre
Senior career
Years	Team	Apps	(Points)
2010–2020	Bordeaux Bègles	214	(225)
- Correct as of 4 December 2019
Provincial / State sides
Years	Team	Apps	(Points)
2007–2010	North Brisbane		
Super Rugby
Years	Team	Apps	(Points)
2009–2010	Queensland Reds	7	(0)
- Correct as of 30 June 2010
International career
Years	Team	Apps	(Points)
2007	Australia U19	3	(20)
2008	Australia U20	5	(10)
- Correct as of 30 June 2008
National sevens team
Years	Team		Comps
2008–2010	Australia Sevens		

Blair Connor (born 29 September 1988) is a rugby union player from Brisbane, Australia. He played for the Queensland Reds in the 2009 Super 14 season and the 2010 Super 14 season. Blair Connor is capable of playing at either centre or wing.

He signed for the Reds while he was still a teenager in 2008 and was a regular in their starting line-up.

In June 2010, he announced he had signed a two-year deal with the French Pro D2 and now Top 14 team, Union Bordeaux Bègles.
