= 2011 Super Rugby final =

Men's rugby union club competition

2011 Super Rugby Final
- Event: 2011 Super Rugby season
Reds	Crusaders
(Australia)	(New Zealand)
18	13
- Date: 9 July 2011
- Venue: Suncorp Stadium, Brisbane
- Referee: Bryce Lawrence (New Zealand)
- Attendance: 52,113

The 2011 Super Rugby Final, was played between the Queensland Reds from Australia and the Crusaders from New Zealand on 9 July 2011. It was the 16th final in the Super Rugby competition's history and the first under the new 15-team format. The Reds had qualified in first place after the regular competition rounds, while the Crusaders qualified in third. The Reds went straight to the semi-final, where they beat New Zealand team the Blues. The Crusaders hosted a qualifying final in Nelson beating the Sharks, and then travelled to Cape Town and beat the Stormers in the other semi-final. As the Reds had qualified higher, the final was hosted in Brisbane at Suncorp Stadium.

The Crusaders went into the final as favourites, despite playing away from home and having travelled across many time-zones to reach the final. This was partly due to their impressive record, reaching ten finals in fourteen years and winning the Super Rugby championship seven times. The match was scoreless in the opening half hour with strong defence shown by both sides, but a try to Dan Carter gave the Crusaders an early lead. The Reds stayed in the game through two penalty kicks from Quade Cooper and went into half-time trailing by 6–7.

The match opened up late in the game as fatigue took its toll on the defence from both sides. Carter kicked a penalty goal in the 49th minute to take the Crusaders to a four-point lead. The Reds hit back through a try to winger Digby Ioane. The conversion from Cooper took it to 13–10 before Carter tied the score with a 45-metre penalty kick in the 56th minute. With the score locked at 13–13, Reds scrum-half Will Genia broke the deadlock with a solo 30 metre run for the standout try of the match. The Reds held on to claim the title, scoring two tries to the Crusaders' one, with the final score at 18–13.

== Road to the Final ==
Final Standings
Pos	Team	W	D	L	PD	TB	LB	Pts
1	(Australia) Reds	13	0	3	+120	5	1	66
2	(South Africa) Stormers	12	0	4	+143	4	3	63
3	(New Zealand) Crusaders	11	1	4	+163	5	2	61
4	(New Zealand) Blues	10	1	5	+70	6	4	60
5	(Australia) Waratahs	10	0	6	+146	6	3	57
6	(South Africa) Sharks	10	1	5	+68	6	1	57
7	(South Africa) Bulls	10	0	6	+46	3	3	54
8	(New Zealand) Highlanders	8	0	8	−47	2	3	45
9	(New Zealand) Hurricanes	5	2	9	−70	5	5	42
10	(New Zealand) Chiefs	6	1	9	−16	2	4	40
11	(South Africa) Cheetahs	5	0	11	−2	5	7	40
12	(Australia) Western Force	5	2	9	−83	0	5	37
13	(Australia) Brumbies	4	1	11	−123	3	4	33
14	(South Africa) Lions	3	1	12	−126	2	5	29
15	(Australia) Rebels	3	0	13	−289	2	2	24

The 2011 Super Rugby championship involved fifteen teams, five each from South Africa, Australia and New Zealand. The 2011 season was the 16th year of the competition, and the first in the new 15 team format (12 teams competed between 1996 and 2005, before increasing to 14 between 2006 and 2010). The 2011 competition began on 18 February with the regular competition rounds consisting of 120 matches over twenty one weeks. Each team played teams from their own country twice (home and away) and four teams from each of the other two countries once (two at home and two away). The top six teams would advance to the finals.

The Reds won the Australian conference and topped the overall standings, with just three losses during the season (to the Brumbies, Waratahs, and Hurricanes). The Crusaders finished top of the New Zealand conference, an outstanding performance after the effect of the February 2011 Christchurch earthquake on the team, including the cancellation of their match with the Hurricanes and the loss of their home ground for the season. The Blues, Waratahs and Sharks filled the remaining three places as the next top finishers.

The Blues hosted the Waratahs in Auckland in the first qualifying final, while the Sharks travelled to Nelson to play the Crusaders. There were two tries apiece scored by the Blues and Waratahs in the first qualifier, but the Blues prevailed with Lachie Munro kicking eleven points off the tee in their 26–13 victory. In Nelson, the Crusaders beat the Sharks in the second qualifier, scoring four tries to one to win 36–8.

For the semi-finals, the Blues travelled to Brisbane to play the Reds and the Crusaders flew to Cape Town to play the Stormers. Both games were won by a clear margin. Rod Davies scored a hat-trick of tries in Brisbane for the Reds to beat the Blues by four tries to one with a final score of 30–13. In the second semi-final at Cape Town, the Stormers and Crusaders scored two tries each, but All Black five eighth Dan Carter scored 17 points to secure the away victory for the Crusaders by 29–10.

First round
24 June 2011
4	(New Zealand) Blues	26
5	(Australia) Waratahs	13
25 June 2011
3	(New Zealand) Crusaders	36
6	(South Africa) Sharks	8

Semifinals
2 July 2011
1	(Australia) Reds	30
4	(New Zealand) Blues	13
2 July 2011
2	(South Africa) Stormers	10
3	(New Zealand) Crusaders	29

Final
9 July 2011
(Australia) Reds	18
(New Zealand) Crusaders	13

== Final match ==
When the same teams played at Suncorp Stadium a month before the final, the Reds had carried off a late 17–16 victory against the Crusaders. Despite being away from home and having travelled over 100,000 kilometres during the year, the Crusaders still went into the match as favourites at odds of 8/15. This was the 10th final for the Crusaders in 14 years and they had won the Super Rugby championship seven times.

The Queensland Reds had won Super Rugby trophies twice before in the amateur era of the Super 10, beating Natal 21–10 in 1994 and Transvaal 30-16 in 1995.

=== First half ===
The Crusaders held the territory and possession advantage early, but Dan Carter pushed a penalty attempt wide at the 15 minute mark. The Reds then wasted two opportunities from attacking positions. After a scoreless opening half hour, Quade Cooper kicked penalty goal in the 32nd minute. The Crusaders replied through a try to Carter who ran hard at the Reds' defenders, kicking the ball ahead as he reached them on the quarter-line, before gliding through to regather and score with 34 minutes gone. He converted his own try to take a four-point lead.

The combative defence of the Crusaders was effective in pressuring Cooper and Genia, who had controlled the play in the Red's win against the Blues in the previous week's semifinal, and largely kept them in check during the opening half. The Crusaders also made errors, though, in particular three not-straight line-out throws from hooker Corey Flynn which gave possession to the Reds. Cooper reduced the deficit with 38 minutes elapsed by kicking another penalty goal following his entanglement with Brad Thorn’s outstretched leg, and the score at half time was 6–7 to the Crusaders.

=== Second half ===
Cooper started things brightly for the Reds after the break, stepping through the line with Rod Davies in support and getting a pass away but it fooled everyone and went to ground. The match opened up as fatigue took its toll on the defence from both sides. Richie McCaw thwarted a midfield break by Ben Tapaui with a critical ankle tap. In the 45th minute, a knock on by Digby Ioane gave a scrum to the Crusaders 20 metres out. Brad Thorn then barged over the line but no try was awarded as the TMO couldn't see a grounding. This was a missed opportunity for the Crusaders as Thorn had 4 unmarked Crusaders to his left. From a scrum penalty a minute later, however, Carter kicked a penalty goal from 22 metres out to put the Crusaders ahead by four.

The Reds retook the lead through a try to Ioane with some big stepping around Sonny Bill Williams and outright pace. Cooper converted it to make the score 13–10, but Carter levelled it up with a 45-metre penalty kick shortly after. With the score at 13 all, Rob Simmons seemed to have broken the deadlock for the Reds with an intercept and long run in to the try-line before the referee ruled that he had knocked on.

Will Genia proved to be the game breaker. The Reds gained a turnover 60 metres out from the Crusaders’ tryline. Anthony Faingaa passed the ball to Genia who accelerated through a gap near the ruck. The Crusaders replacement scrumhalf Kahn Fotuali’i attempted an ankle tap instead of a diving tackle, and missed. Genia was over the forty-metre line. Having Cooper to his left in support held off Sonny Bill Williams and Zac Guildford, leaving Sean Maitland to defend against Genia. With a fend on Maitland, Genia's momentum carried him over the line to claim the standout try of the match. The Reds were in front with 10 minutes remaining. They held on to win their first major title since the game turned professional in the mid 1990s. The attendance of 52,113 was a then record crowd for Super Rugby in Australia. The Reds scored two tries to the Crusaders' one, with the final score at 18–13. Will Genia was named as the Man of the Match.

== Match details ==
9 July 2011
19:40

Reds (Australia)	18–13	(New Zealand) Crusaders
Try: Digby Ioane 51' c, Will Genia 68' m Con: Quade Cooper (1/2); Pen: Quade Cooper (2/3) 32', 38'	Report; Summary	Try: Dan Carter 34' c Con: Dan Carter (1/1); Pen: Dan Carter (2/3) 49', 56'

Suncorp Stadium, Brisbane
Attendance: 52,113
Referee: Bryce Lawrence (New Zealand)

Reds	Crusaders

FB	15	Jono Lance
RW	14	Rodney Davies
CE	13	Anthony Fainga'a
SF	12	Ben Tapuai
LW	11	Digby Ioane
FF	10	Quade Cooper
HB	9	Will Genia (vc)
N8	8	Radike Samo
OF	7	Beau Robinson
BF	6	Scott Higginbotham
RL	5	James Horwill (c)
LL	4	Rob Simmons
TP	3	Greg Holmes
HK	2	Saia Fainga'a
LP	1	Ben Daley
Substitutes:
HK	16	James Hanson
PR	17	Guy Shepherdson
LK	18	Adam Wallace-Harrison
N8	19	Jake Schatz
FL	20	Liam Gill
SH	21	Ian Prior
CE	22	Will Chambers
Coach:
(Australia) Ewen McKenzie

FB	15	Tom Marshall
RW	14	Sean Maitland
CE	13	Robbie Fruean
SF	12	Sonny Bill Williams
LW	11	Zac Guildford
FF	10	Dan Carter
HB	9	Andy Ellis
N8	8	Kieran Read
OF	7	Richie McCaw (c)
BF	6	George Whitelock
RL	5	Sam Whitelock
LL	4	Brad Thorn
TP	3	Owen Franks
HK	2	Corey Flynn
LP	1	Wyatt Crockett
Substitutes:
HK	16	Quentin MacDonald
PR	17	Ben Franks
LK	18	Luke Romano
N8	19	Matt Todd
HB	20	Kahn Fotuali'i
FF	21	Matt Berquist
CE	22	Ryan Crotty
Coach:
(New Zealand) Todd Blackadder

Man of the Match:
Will Genia (Reds)

Touch judges:
Stuart Dickinson (Australia)
Vinny Munro (New Zealand)
Television match official:
George Ayoub (Australia)

Preceded by 2010 Super 14 Final	Super Rugby Final; 2011	Succeeded by 2012 Super Rugby Final
