= Tomoaki Taniguchi =

Japan international rugby union player

- Born: August 26, 1982 (age 44)
- Height: 1.93 m (6 ft 4 in)
- Weight: 125 kg (276 lb; 19.7 st)

Rugby union career
- Position: Lock
Senior career
Years	Team	Apps	(Points)
2010−	Toyota Verblitz	65	(25)
- Correct as of 15 January 2017
International career
Years	Team	Apps	(Points)
2006–08	Japan	12	(10)

Tomoaki Taniguchi (谷口 智昭 Taniguchi Tomoaki; born August 26, 1982, in Hyogo prefecture) is a Japanese rugby player who plays at lock for Toyota Verblitz and Japan. He scored two tries after coming on in the second half for Japan against Australia A on June 8, 2008 (2008 IRB Pacific Nations Cup Round One). He graduated from Ritsumeikan University.
