= Dylan des Fountain =

South African rugby union player

- Full name: Dylan des Fountain
- Born: 7 June 1985 (age 41) Cape Town, South Africa
- Height: 1.87 m (6 ft 1 1/2 in)
- Weight: 95 kg (14 st 13 lb; 209 lb)
- School: Paarl Gimnasium

Rugby union career
- Position: Centre / Winger
Youth career
- 2005–2006: Blue Bulls U21
Senior career
Years	Team	Apps	(Points)
2004	Blue Bulls	1	(0)
2007–2010	Western Province	24	(20)
2007–2009	Stormers	18	(15)
2010–2011	Aironi	2	(0)
2011–2014	Golden Lions	26	(15)
2011–2013	Lions	8	(5)
- Correct as of 18 May 2014

Dylan des Fountain (born 7 June 1985 in Cape Town) is a former professional South African rugby union footballer. He played mostly as a centre or a winger and represented South African domestic sides the Blue Bulls, Western Province and the Golden Lions, as well as playing Super Rugby for the Stormers and Lions. He also spent a season with Italian side Aironi.

He announced his retirement on 19 March 2014 due to a knee injury.
