= Jan Pickard =

South African rugby union player

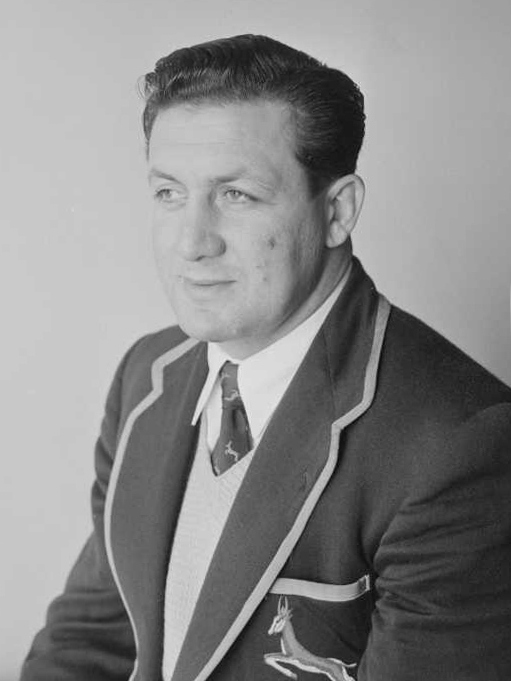
- Pickard in New Zealand in 1956
- Born: Jan Albertus Jacobus Pickard; 25 December 1927 Paarl, Cape Province, Union of South Africa
- Died: 30 May 1998 (aged 70) Cape Town, Western Cape, South Africa
- School: Paarl Gimnasium
- University: Stellenbosch University
- Notable relative: Francois Louw (grandson)

Rugby union career
- Position: Lock
Provincial / State sides
Years	Team	Apps	(Points)
1951–?	Western Province		
- Correct as of 18 July 2010
International career
Years	Team	Apps	(Points)
1953–58	South Africa	4	(0)
- Correct as of 18 July 2010

Jan Albertus Jacobus Pickard (25 December 1927 – 30 May 1998) was a South African rugby union international who played as a lock. Born in Paarl and a product of Stellenbosch University, Pickard made his provincial debut for Western Province in 1951. He was the grandfather of Francois Louw, who also played for Western Province and South Africa. Pickard was selected to represent South Africa on the 1951–52 tour of Great Britain and France, although he was not selected for any of the Test matches. His first appearance in a Test match came in September 1953, against Australia in Durban. South Africa won the game 18–8, this was followed by a further victory over Australia a week later—a 22–9 victory in Port Elizabeth, which Pickard also took part in. The next time Pickard was selected for South Africa was for the 1956 tour of Australia and New Zealand. He was selected to play in the second Test of the four match series against New Zealand and played as a number eight in an 8–3 South Africa victory. Pickard made his final appearance for South Africa in August 1958 against France at Ellis Park in Johannesburg. France won the game 9–5, with Pickard playing in his usual position at Lock. Pickard died in Cape Town in May 1998 at the age of 70.
