= AJ Whalley =

- Full name: Adam Whalley
- Born: 20 May 1982 (age 44)
- Height: 186 cm (6 ft 1 in)
- Weight: 117 kg (258 lb)

Rugby union career
- Position: Prop
Super Rugby
Years	Team	Apps	(Points)
2007–09	Force	27	(15)

Adam "AJ" Whalley (born 20 May 1982) is an Australian former professional rugby union player.

Whalley grew up in the New South Wales city of Grafton and was an Australian under-21 representative as a loose forward. He played rugby for Warringah and after switching to the front row had two months with English club Bristol Shogun in late 2004, a stint organised by Bob Dwyer and funded by the Waratahs to give him experience.

Signed by the Western Force, Whalley relocated to Perth in 2005 and the following year undertook a tour of South Africa with the team. He didn't feature for the Force in their inaugural Super 14 season in 2006, spending a long period sidelined by a thumb injury, before breaking into the lineup in 2007 with seven appearances. Over the next two years, Whalley was a regular for the Force, then spent a season in France with US Dax before leaving professional rugby.
