= Joe Savage (rugby union) =

- Full name: Joseph Hakipene Savage
- Born: 16 December 1982 (age 43)
- Height: 183 cm (6 ft 0 in)
- Weight: 112 kg (247 lb)

Rugby union career
- Position: Prop
Provincial / State sides
Years	Team	Apps	(Points)
2007	North Harbour	3	(0)
2008–10	Bay of Plenty	35	(5)
Super Rugby
Years	Team	Apps	(Points)
2009	Chiefs	2	(0)

Joseph Hakipene Savage (born 16 December 1982) is a New Zealand former professional rugby union player.

A prop, Savage got his start in provincial rugby with North Harbour in 2007, then played for Bay of Plenty from 2008 to 2010. He made two appearances for the Chiefs in 2009, debuting against the Western Force in round four. An injury to Ben May earned him a recall late in the campaign and he came on off the bench in the Super 14 final loss to the Bulls.

Savage, after relocating to Australia, won the RugbyWA premier grade player of the year award in 2013 playing with Perth-based club Palmyra. He competed for Perth Spirit in the National Rugby Championship.
