= Newlands Stadium =

Rugby and football stadium in Cape Town, South Africa

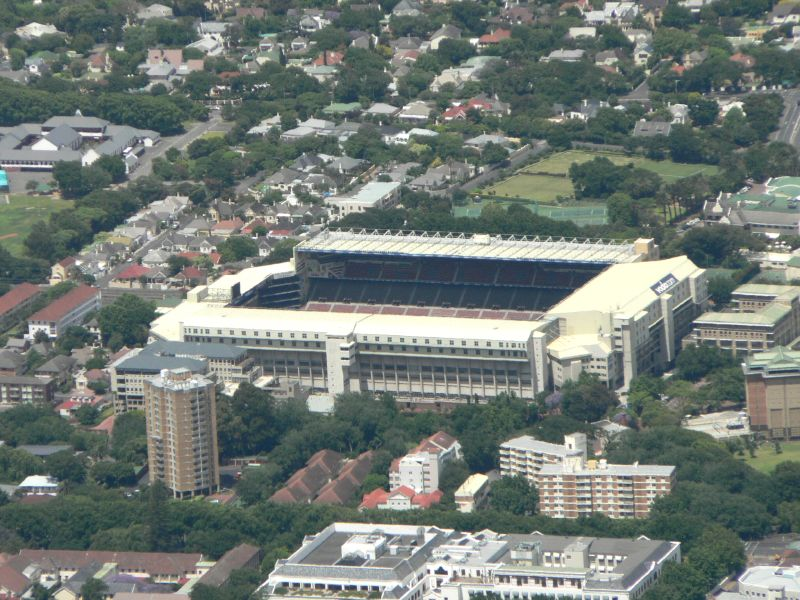
- Interactive map of Newlands Stadium
- Full name: Newlands Stadium
- Location: Cape Town, South Africa
- Coordinates: 33°58′14″S 18°28′6″E
- Owner: Investec
- Capacity: 51,900
- Surface: Grass

Construction
- Opened: 1888
- Renovated: 1919
- Closed: 2020

Tenants
- Western Province (1888–2021); Stormers (1996–2021)

Website
- wprugby.co.za

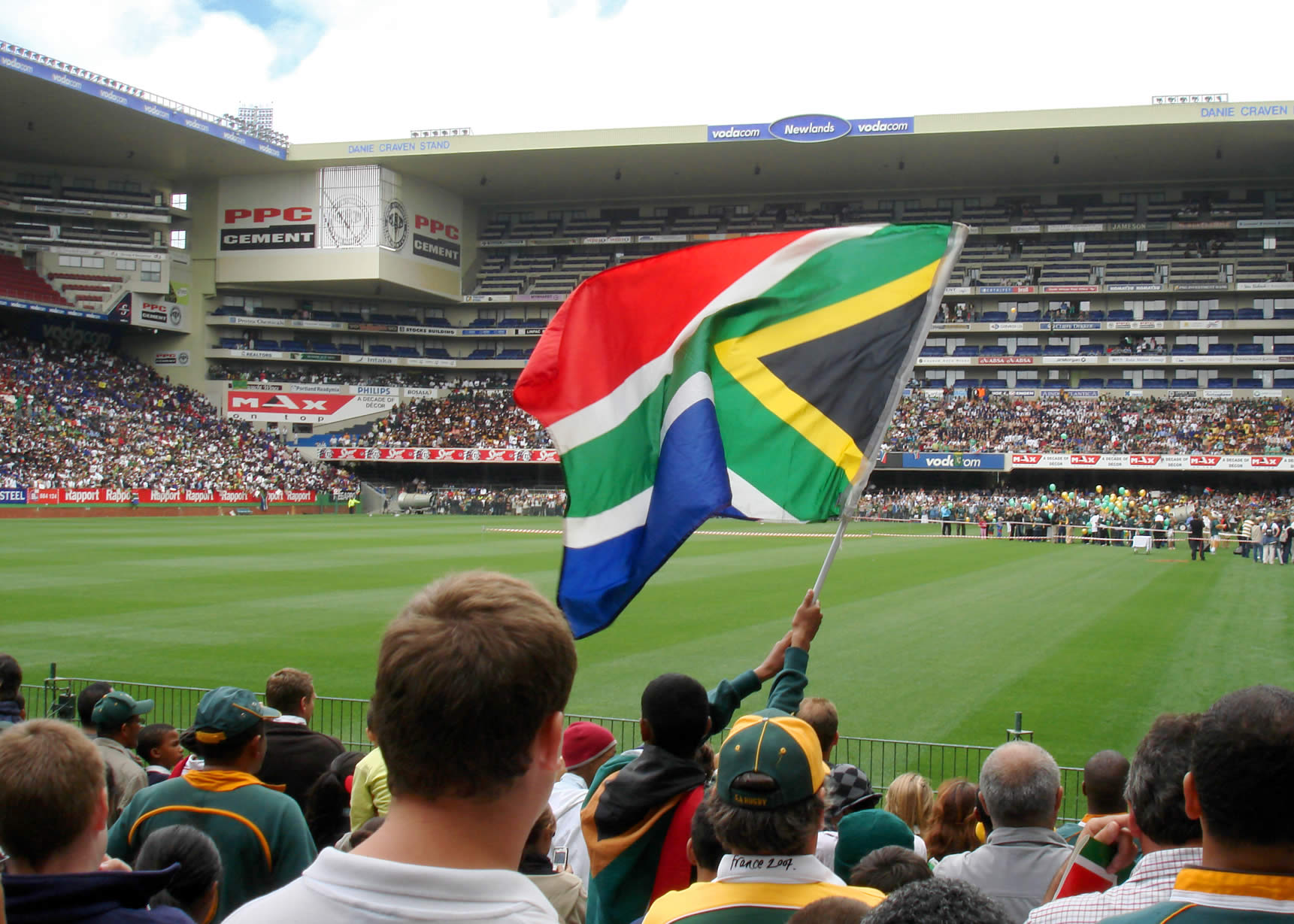

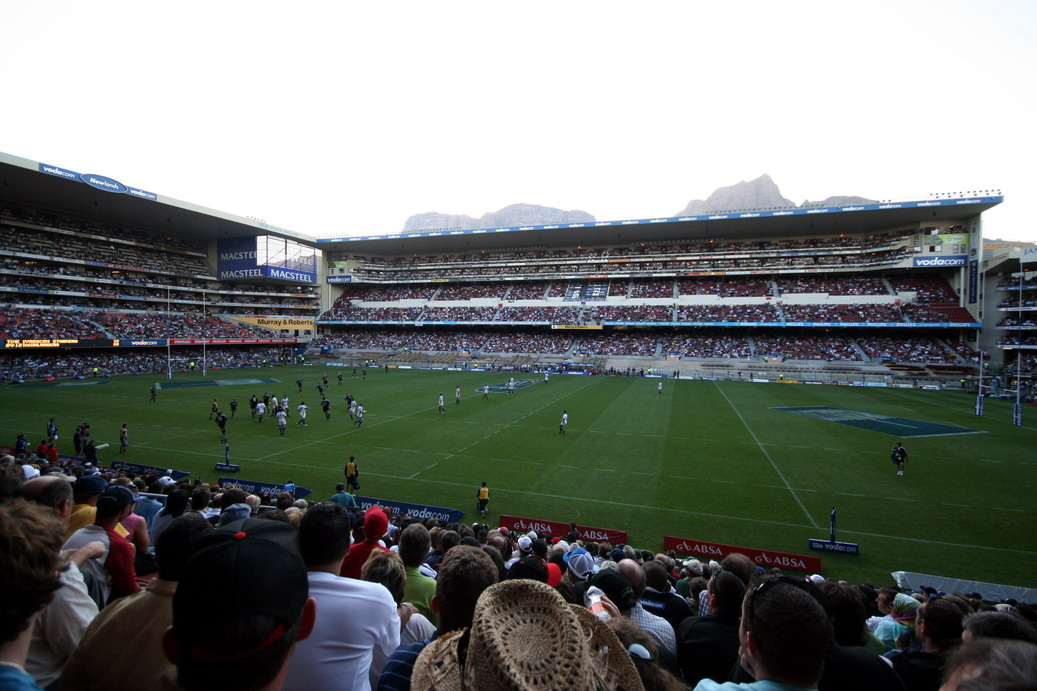
A Stormers Super Rugby match at Newlands.

The Newlands Stadium is located in Cape Town, South Africa. The stadium has a capacity of 51,900 people, but is not an all-seater venue.

Various sports teams used the stadium as their home base, including:

- Stormers in Super Rugby
- Western Province in the Currie Cup

The city's soccer clubs Ajax Cape Town, Santos and the dissolved club Vasco da Gama occasionally hosted matches at the Newlands Stadium.

== History ==
The Western Province Rugby and Football Union decided to buy the ground the stadium stands on in 1888. The first official match at Newlands took place on 31 May 1890 when Stellenbosch defeated Villagers in front of a crowd of about 2,400 people. The following year the stadium hosted its first rugby test when the British Lions toured South Africa.

The first permanent concrete stands were erected on the grounds in 1919. Later, in 1927, the new grandstand was erected and the field layout was changed to run from north–south. Yet more changes came in 1931 when the South stand was also enlarged.

In the 1950s parts of a new grandstand as well as South stand were completed, facilities such as lifts and a Presidential room were added, a fourth bay was added to the grandstand, and an extension was added to the lower gallery.

The 1970s saw the stadium change once again as the headquarters of SA Rugby moved to Newlands, and several stands were built or renovated, while the 1980s saw private suites and function rooms erected on top of the North stands as well as demolition of the old South stand and inauguration of the new Danie Craven stand (also with private suites and function rooms). The 1980s also saw 10,253 seats added to the stadium.

Between 1990 and 1995 the stadium was under constant renovation, adding technology, increasing capacity, and upgrading facilities, as part of a 3-phase redevelopment plan in anticipation of the 1995 Rugby World Cup, when Newlands hosted the opening match of the tournament.

After the World Cup, development continued with several redevelopment and expansion projects to make the stadium more modern and increase capacity. There are four main stands at Newlands: the all-seated Grandstand and Railway stands along both sidelines, and the Danie Craven and Jan Pickard stands behind the goals. Both of the end stands feature many of the ground's corporate boxes: the Craven stand also has a large standing terrace area, while the alcohol-free Pickard stand is mostly seating while also playing home to the stadium's video screen.

The stadium's name was changed several times by various sponsors, first from Newlands to Norwich Park Newlands in 1996, then to Fedsure Park Newlands in 2000 due to a merger between Fedsure and Norwich, and finally back to simply Newlands by Investec when they became the main sponsor in 2002. In late 2005, Vodacom became the stadium's main sponsor, but followed Investec's precedent and kept the stadium name as Newlands. However, from 2011 the ground was known as DHL Newlands after Western Province and the Stormers changed sponsors.,

== 1995 Rugby World Cup ==
In 1995 the stadium was one of the host venues for the Rugby World Cup held in South Africa. The stadium hosted two pool games in Pool A. The stadium also hosted one quarter final with England defeating Australia 25–22. The stadium was then used for the semi-final between England and New Zealand, with England losing 29–45.

Date	Team #1	Result	Team #2	Round	Attendance
25 May 1995	South Africa	27–18	Australia	Pool A	51,000
30 May 1995	South Africa	21–8	Romania	Pool A	45,000
11 June 1995	England	25–22	Australia	Quarter-final	35,448
18 June 1995	England	29–45	New Zealand	Semi-final	51,000

== Sale ==
In 2016, speculation began that WP rugby would sell Newlands, and that the Stormers and Western Province would play their home matches at the Cape Town Stadium. However, the Western Province Rugby Union decided at the time that they would rather remain at Newlands.

In 2020 it was confirmed that the stadium would be sold to a preferred bidder via a sealed-envelope bidding process and demolished in 2022 for residential and retail developments to be built. The sale was delayed when a group of former rugby players, led by former Springbok, Wynand Claasen, submitted an application to have the stadium declared a heritage site. As of 1 March 2023 this process is still ongoing.

In March 2023 the Cape Town Stadium became the official home of Western Province Rugby after the union signed an Anchor Tenant Agreement.
