= Werner Kruger =

South African rugby union player (born 1985)

- Born: 23 January 1985 (age 41) Kempton Park, South Africa
- Height: 1.91 m (6 ft 3 in)
- Weight: 117 kg (18 st 6 lb; 258 lb)
- School: Jeugland Hoërskool

Rugby union career
- Position: Tighthead Prop
- Current team: Scarlets
Senior career
Years	Team	Apps	(Points)
2003–2015	Blue Bulls	134	(35)
2007	Blue Bulls XV	1	(0)
2008–2016	Bulls	120	(40)
2016–2021	Scarlets	122	(45)
- Correct as of 1 February 2021
International career
Years	Team	Apps	(Points)
2005–2006	South Africa Under-21	6	(0)
2009	Emerging Springboks	1	(0)
2010	South Africa (tour)	1	(0)
2011–2012	South Africa (test)	4	(0)
- Correct as of 13 June 2015

Werner Kruger (born 23 January 1985 in Kempton Park, South Africa) is a former rugby union player who played at prop. He ended his career playing for Scarlets in the Pro14, having spent the bulk of his career at Super Rugby side the Bulls, where he made his debut during the 2008 season. Kruger was part of the Bulls team that won both the 2009 and 2010 Super 14 finals. He played for the Blue Bulls in the Currie Cup and has represented South Africa at under 21 level. He won the Pro12 with the Scarlets in the 2016/2017 season against Munster Rugby.

In August 2015, Kruger became the first player to have played in 100 Super Rugby matches for the Bulls, as well as 100 Currie Cup matches for the Blue Bulls.

Kruger signed a contract to join Welsh Pro12 side Scarlets on a three-year deal prior to the 2016–2017 season. Kruger played in the Dublin final vs Munster, the Scarlets won to be crowned 2016–17 Pro12 champions.

On 1 February 2021, Kruger announced his retirement from the competition at the end of the 2020–21 season.
