= Haig Sare =

Australia rugby player (born 1982)

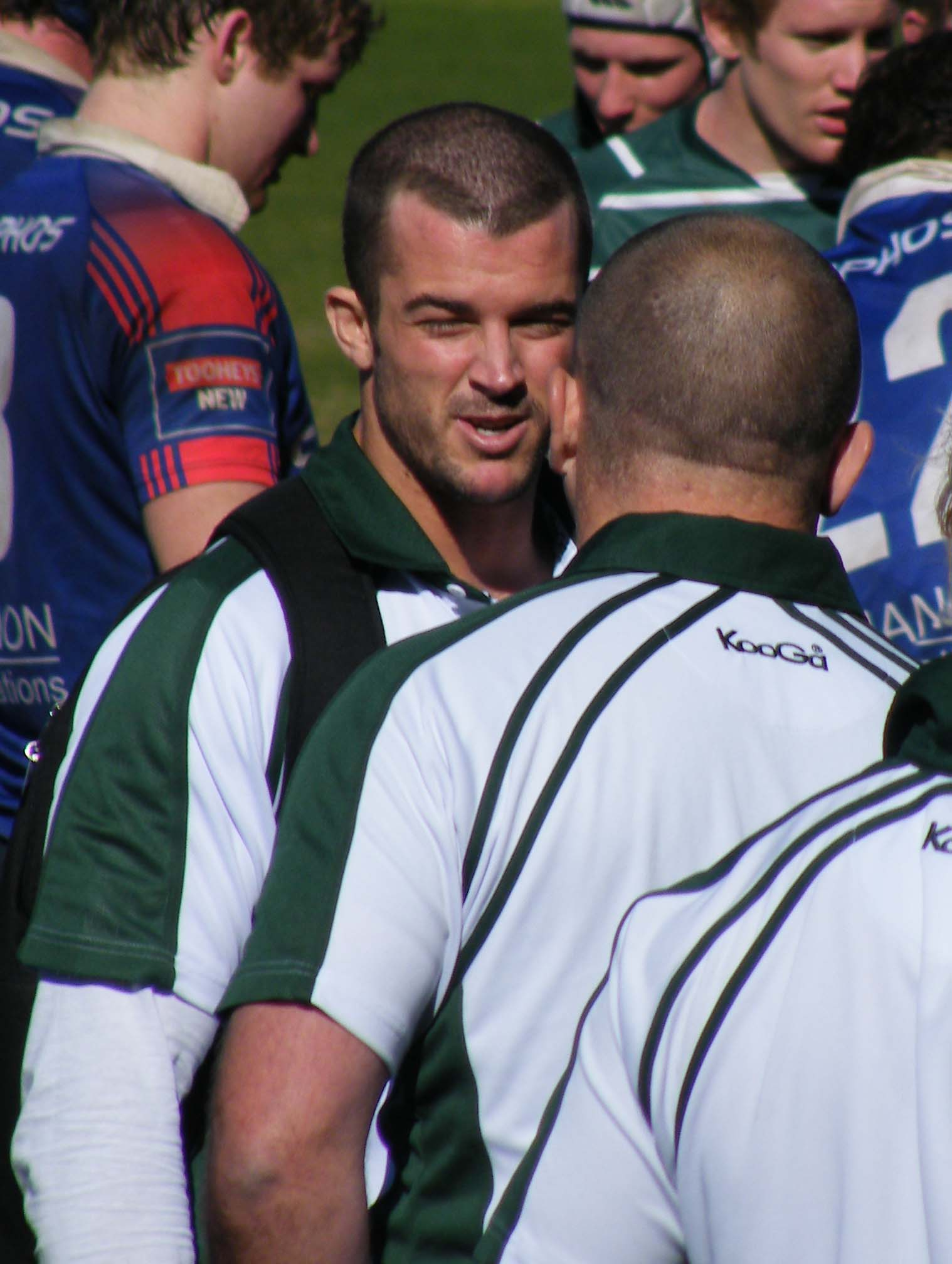
- Born: 25 March 1982 (age 44)
- Height: 1.83 m (6 ft 0 in)
- Weight: 101 kg (223 lb)

Rugby union career
- Position: Winger/Centre
Senior career
Years	Team	Apps	(Points)
2005	Biarritz	8	(0)
2007	Perth Spirit	1	(0)
Super Rugby
Years	Team	Apps	(Points)
2006–2010	Western Force	34	(20)

Haig Sare (born 25 March 1982) is a former Australian rugby union player. He played as centre or winger for the Western Force in the Super Rugby competition. He played schoolboy rugby for the Shore School in Sydney; represented Australia "A" and Australian U21s; and also had a season with French Rugby champions Biarritz Olympique. Sare retired from professional rugby in 2011 following injury.

After retirement he took up coaching and from 2013 to 2015 was head coach of the Warringah Rats. Sare left that post in early 2015 to move to Queensland. He is now a real estate broker.

== Career ==
Sare has represented Australia at Under 21s level; played for Australia A; and also played for Biarritz Olympique in France.
