= Steven Setephano =

New Zealand rugby union player

- Born: 15 April 1984 (age 42) Wellington, New Zealand
- Height: 1.92 m (6 ft 4 in)
- Weight: 110 kg (17 st 5 lb)

Rugby union career
- Position(s): Number 8, Flanker
Senior career
Years	Team	Apps	(Points)
2011–2015	NTT DoCoMo Red Hurricanes	39	(50)
2015–	Football club de Grenoble rugby		
- Correct as of 19 January 2015
Provincial / State sides
Years	Team	Apps	(Points)
2005–2007	Waikato	21	(15)
2008–2009	Otago	17	(5)
2010	Waikato	4	(0)
Super Rugby
Years	Team	Apps	(Points)
2008–2010	Highlanders	30	(20)
2011	Chiefs	2	(0)
International career
Years	Team	Apps	(Points)
2014–	Cook Islands		

Steven Miimetua Setephano (born 15 April 1984) is a New Zealand rugby union player of Cook Islands descent who has represented the Cook Islands national rugby union team. His positions of choice are number 8 or flanker. He has previously played for Waikato and Otago in the National Provincial Championship as well as the Highlanders and Chiefs in the Super Rugby competition. He currently plays for FC Grenoble in the Pro D2.

== Early life ==
Setephano was born in Wellington and educated at St Stephens' school in Auckland and then at Rotorua Boys' High School. He played club rugby for Hamilton Marist.

== Playing career ==
=== New Zealand ===
Setephano began his provincial career with Waikato in 2005, and was a regular member of their Air New Zealand Cup squads in 2005, 2006 and 2007, playing 19 matches. In 2004 he was picked for the Chiefs development squad. He remained in the development squad in 2006 and 2007, but did not play any matches.

In an effort to have a stronger chance at earning a Super Rugby contract, Setephano shifted south to Dunedin, where he played for Otago in the Air New Zealand Cup and the Highlanders in Super Rugby.

In 2010 he rejoined Waikato for the 2010 ITM Cup, However, his season was ended prematurely by a calf injury after just 4 matches. He was not retained by the Highlanders for the 2011 season, as the club made wholesale changes under new coach Jamie Joseph, resulting in him moving back to the Chiefs for the 2011 season.

=== Japan and Europe ===
Setephano moved to Japan where he played for the NTT DoCoMo Red Hurricanes in the Top League. He left the club in 2015.

In 2015 he moved to France, where he trialled for a few weeks with Castres Olympique. In June 2015 he signed a deal to move to France with FC Grenoble for the 2015-16 Top 14 season. His contract was extended in 2016. Initially not retained at the end of the 2016-2017 season, he finally extended his contract following the club's relegation to Pro D2. At the start of the Pro D2 season, he was named team captain, and he led the team during their move up to the Top 14, after a victory in the accession play- off against Oyonnax. he retired in June 2020, moving into a coaching role.

=== International ===
Setephano played for the New Zealand Under-19 team in 2003 and Under-21 in 2004.

He made his international debut for the Cook Islands at the 2015 Rugby World Cup Oceania qualifier against Fiji on 28 June 2014 in Churchill Park, Lautoka.
