= Chris Lowrey =

- Born: 15 August 1986 (age 40) Auckland, New Zealand
- Height: 1.94 m (6 ft 4 in)
- Weight: 110 kg (17 st 5 lb)

Rugby union career
- Position: Loose forward
Amateur team(s)
| Years | Team | Apps | (Points) |
- Ponsonby, Grammar Carlton Juniors
Senior career
| Years | Team | Apps | (Points) |
| 2013− | Toyoto Shokki Shuttles | 16 | (5) |
- Correct as of 19 January 2015
Provincial / State sides
| Years | Team | Apps | (Points) |
| 2008–2012 | Auckland | 22 | (10) |
Super Rugby
| Years | Team | Apps | (Points) |
| 2009–2012 | Blues | 34 | (30) |
- Correct as of 25 July 2012

Chris Lowrey (born 15 August 1986) is a New Zealand rugby union footballer who plays for Toyota in the Japanese Top League. He previously played for Auckland in the Air New Zealand Cup and the Blues in the Super Rugby competition. His playing positions are number eight and flanker. Lowrey won the Blues "Rookie of the year" honours in 2009.

Lowrey played club rugby for Ponsonby, where he won the 2007 Auckland Club Player of the Year Award. He also competed for the New Zealand Colts against Canada in 2007. Lowrey is a former student of Mount Albert Grammar School where he was Head Boy (2004) and captain of the First XV Rugby Team.
