= Patrick Phibbs =

Australian rugby union player

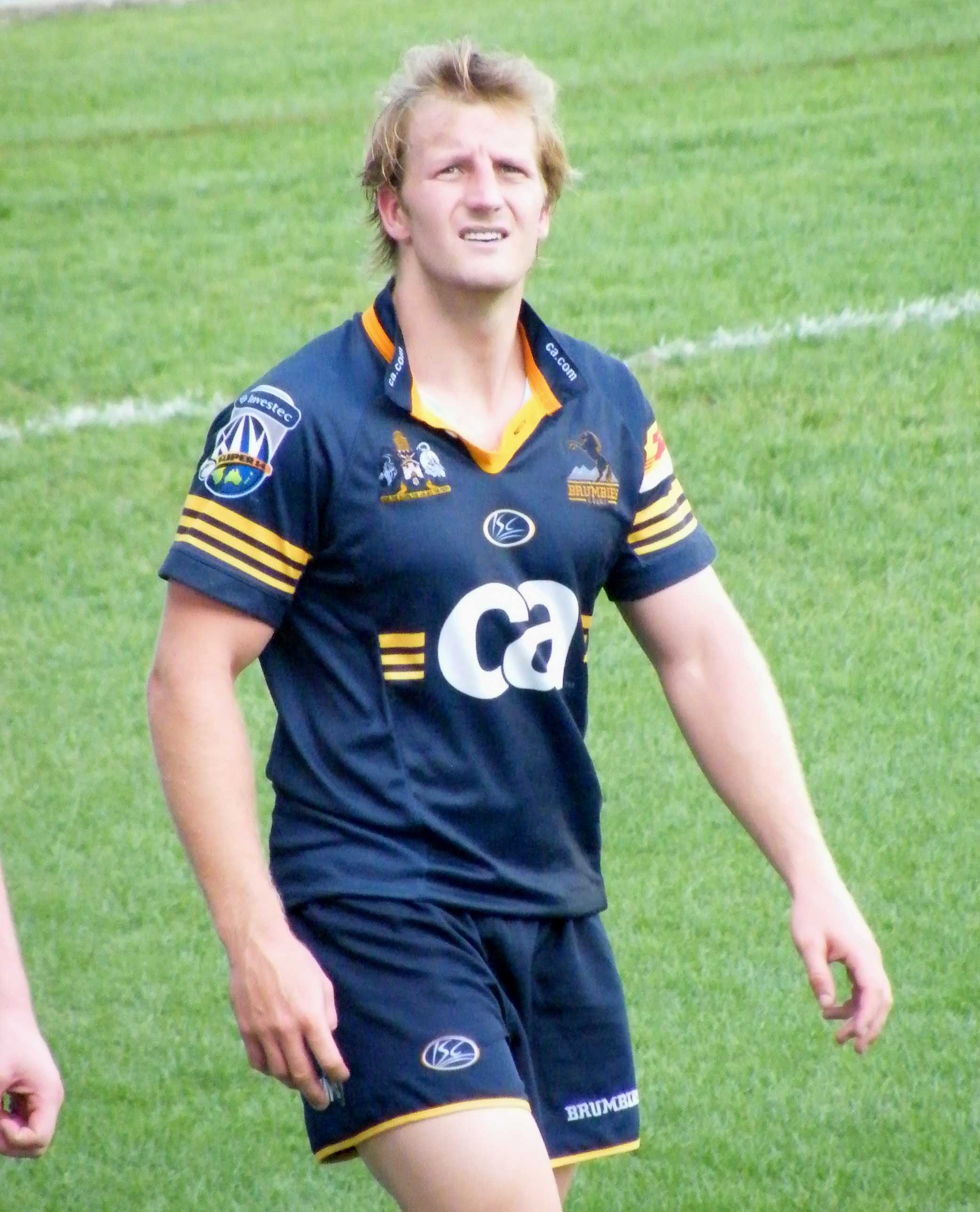
- Patrick Phibbs playing for the Brumbies
- Born: 16 October 1981 (age 45) Sydney, New South Wales, Australia
- Height: 180 cm (5 ft 11 in)
- Weight: 88 kg (13 st 12 lb; 194 lb)

Rugby union career
- Position: Scrumhalf
Senior career
Years	Team	Apps	(Points)
2003	Saracens	4	(0)
2011–12	Exeter Chiefs	11	(10)
2012–	London Irish	10	(0)
2013	Leicester Tigers	4	(0)
- Correct as of 11 February 2014
Super Rugby
Years	Team	Apps	(Points)
2005–11	Brumbies	73	(45)

Patrick Phibbs (born 16 October 1981) is an Australian Professional Rugby Union player currently based in Reading with London Irish.

== Career ==
Phibbs played his junior Rugby with Randwick DRUFC in the Sydney club competition. He represented Australia in the Under 19s squad and the National Sevens squad between 2001 and 2004. In 2005 he debuted against the Reds for the ACT Brumbies. Phibbs went on to play over 70 Super Rugby games while there. While in Canberra Phibbs also played for the Canberra Vikings in the ARC. In 2008 Phibbs was selected to represent Australia in the Australia A Pacific Nations Cup.

After seven years with Super Rugby side ACT Brumbies, Phibbs joined the Exeter Chiefs on a short-term contract at the end of the 2011 Super Rugby Season. After impressing Head Coach Rob Baxter he was offered an extended contract for the remainder of the season For the 2012/2013 Season Phibbs joined Heineken Cup Winning side the Leicester Tigers
