= Peter Kimlin =

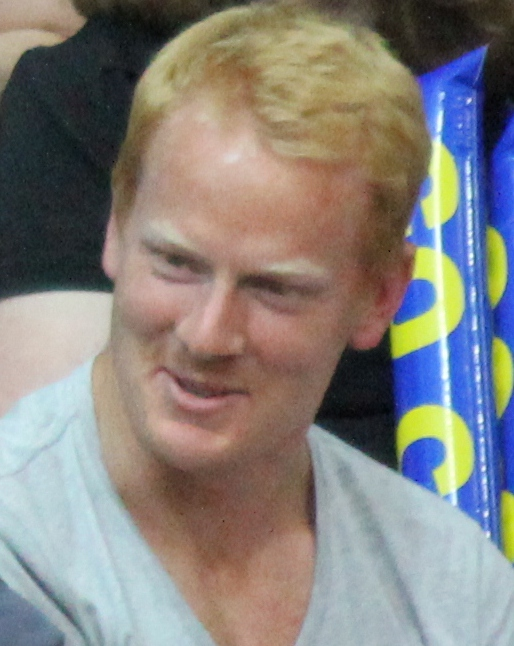
- Born: Peter Kimlin; 11 July 1985 (age 41) Canberra, Australia
- Height: 1.98 m (6 ft 6 in)
- Weight: 114 kg (251 lb; 17 st 13 lb)
- School: Canberra Grammar School, ACT

Rugby union career
- Position: Lock / Flank
- Current team: FC Grenoble
Senior career
Years	Team	Apps	(Points)
2007	Canberra Vikings	8	(10)
2010	Exeter Chiefs	3	(0)
2013–17	Grenoble	69	(25)
2017–19	Toyota Industries Shuttles	15	(5)
- Correct as of 29 December 2019
Super Rugby
Years	Team	Apps	(Points)
2007–13	Brumbies	77	(30)
- Correct as of 4 August 2013
International career
Years	Team	Apps	(Points)
2009	Wallabies	2	(0)
2008	Australia A		
2004	Australia U-19		
2003	Australia Schoolboys		

Peter Kimlin is an Australian rugby union football player who plays for Grenoble in the French Top 14.

He played for the ACT Brumbies in the Super Rugby competition from 2007 through to 2013. That final year in 2013 he captained the victorious Brumbies side against The British and Irish Lions who were the first Australian club side to be successful in over 40 years. Later that year he was a part of the side which fell to NZ Chiefs in the Super Rugby Final.

He plays as a lock, flanker and also number 8.

On 13 October 2010 it was announced that Kimlin signed a short-term contract to join the Exeter Chiefs in England during the 2010/11 season in order to get game-time prior to the upcoming Super Rugby season and his bid for a spot in Australia's Rugby World Cup squad, having 18 months of action with nerve damage to his shoulder. However his stay in the UK with the Chiefs was cut short after suffering a knee injury in training with Exeter following a collision with team-mate Paul McKenzie.

It was announced on 20 April 2013 that Kimlin, along with Brumbies teammate Dan Palmer, had joined French Top 14 side FC Grenoble.
