= Callum Bruce =

New Zealand rugby union player

- Born: 9 June 1983 (age 43) Hastings, New Zealand
- Height: 1.8 m (5 ft 11 in)
- Weight: 93 kg (205 lb)
- School: Napier Boys' High School

Rugby union career
- Position: Second five-eighth
Senior career
Years	Team	Apps	(Points)
2012−	Canon Eagles	36	(59)
- Correct as of 19 January 2015
Provincial / State sides
Years	Team	Apps	(Points)
2005-07	Otago	24	
2008-10	Waikato	26	
Super Rugby
Years	Team	Apps	(Points)
2006-07	Highlanders	22	(16)
2008-10	Chiefs	35	(25)
International career
Years	Team	Apps	(Points)
- New Zealand Māori

Callum Bruce (born 9 June 1983 in Hastings, New Zealand) is a New Zealand rugby union player.

== Super 14 ==
Bruce formerly played for the Super Rugby team Highlanders. He played for the Super Rugby team Chiefs. Although his normal position is second five-eighth, Bruce has also covered first five-eighth for the Highlanders when regular fly-half Nick Evans has been injured.

In June 2010 it was announced that Callum would be moving to play in Japan.
