= 2012 Māori All Blacks tour of England =

- Coach: Jamie Joseph
- Tour captain: Tanerau Latimer
- Top point scorer: Willie Ripia (41)
- Top try scorer(s): Frae Wilson; Charlie Ngatai (2 each)
Summary
| P | W | D | L |
Total
| 3 | 2 | 0 | 1 |
Test match
| 0 | 0 | 0 | 0 |

Tour chronology
- ← 1982 Wales & Spain 2013 N.America →

The 2012 New Zealand Māori rugby union tour of England was a series of three matches played by the Māori All Blacks (then known as the New Zealand Māori team) in England.

Despite playing three fixtures, only one would be against a test international nation (Canada); this was the second time the two teams met. The Māori team also faced English domestic team Leicester Tigers and a RFU Championship XV, a team consisting of players that compete in England's second-tier club tournament, RFU Championship.

== Fixtures ==
=== Leicester Tigers ===
13 November 2012
19:30 WET/GMT+0 (UTC+0)

| Leicester Tigers (England) | 32–24 | (Māori people) Māori All Blacks |
| Try: Morris 17' c Thompstone 29' c Con: Ford (2/2) 18', 30'; Pen: Ford (6/7) 2', 8', 12', 22', 43', 66' | Report | Try: Wilson 5' c Bateman 39' c Ngatai 63' c Con: Ripia (3/3) 6', 40', 64'; Pen: Ripia (1/3) 33' |

Welford Road, Leicester
Attendance: 17,206
Referee: Andrew Small (England)

Leicester Tigers
| FB | O | (England) Mathew Tait |
| RW | N | (Ireland) Niall Morris |
| OC | M | (England) Matt Smith | | (substituted off) 53' |
| IC | L | (England) Anthony Allen |
| LW | K | (England) Adam Thompstone | | (substituted off) 65' |
| FH | J | (England) George Ford |
| SH | I | (Australia) Patrick Phibbs | | (substituted off) 60' |
| N8 | G | (England) Jordan Crane | | (substituted off) 73' |
| OF | H | (Australia) Julian Salvi |
| BF | F | (England) Ed Slater |
| RL | E | (England) Graham Kitchener |
| LL | D | (England) Louis Deacon (c) |
| TP | C | (England) Fraser Balmain |
| HK | B | (England) George Chuter | | (substituted off) 65' |
| LP | A | (England) Boris Stankovich |
Replacements:
| PR | P | (England) Jonny Harris |
| HK | Q | (England) Jimmy Stevens | | (substituted on) 65' |
| PR | R | (England) Kieran Brookes |
| FL | S | (Ireland) Michael Noone |
| N8 | T | (England) Richard Thorpe | | (substituted on) 73' |
| SH | U | (England) Sam Harrison | | (substituted on) 60' |
| CE | V | (New Zealand) Daniel Bowden | (yellow card) 57' to 67' | (substituted on) 53' |
| CE | W | (England) Andy Forsyth | | (substituted on) 65' |
Coach:
(England) Richard Cockerill

Māori All Blacks
| FB | 15 | Andre Taylor | (yellow card) 11' to 21' |
| RW | 14 | Kurt Baker |
| OC | 13 | Charlie Ngatai | | (substituted off) 65' |
| IC | 12 | Tim Bateman |
| LW | 11 | Kade Poki | | (substituted off) 64' |
| FH | 10 | Willie Ripia |
| SH | 9 | Frae Wilson | | (substituted off) 57' |
| N8 | 8 | Elliot Dixon | | (substituted off) 57' |
| OF | 7 | Tanerau Latimer (c) |
| BF | 6 | Shane Christie |
| RL | 5 | Jason Eaton |
| LL | 4 | Jarrad Hoeata | (yellow card) 62' to 72' | (substituted off) 72' |
| TP | 3 | Ben Afeaki | | (substituted off) 68' |
| HK | 2 | Hika Elliot | | (substituted off) 68' |
| LP | 1 | Ben May | | (substituted off) 57' |
Replacements:
| HK | 16 | Quentin MacDonald | | (substituted on) 68' |
| PR | 17 | Jacob Ellison | | (substituted on) 57' |
| PR | 18 | Bronson Murray | | (substituted on) 68' |
| LK | 19 | Romana Graham | | (substituted on) 72' |
| FL | 20 | Nick Crosswell | | (substituted on) 57' |
| SH | 21 | Jamison Gibson-Park | | (substituted on) 57' |
| CE | 22 | Jackson Willison | | (substituted on) 65' |
| WG | 23 | Declan O'Donnell | | (substituted on) 64' |
Coach:
(New Zealand) Jamie Joseph

Touch judges:
Ian Tempest (England)
Paul Dix (England)

Notes:

- The Tigers returned to using their traditional lettered-flocked jerseys for this non-test match. They last used this system when they hosted Australia in 2010.

=== RFU Championship XV ===
17 November 2012
12:05 WET/GMT+0 (UTC+0)

| RFU Championship XV (England) | 21–52 | (Māori people) Māori All Blacks |
| Try: Mama 22' m Crane 78' c Con: Roberts (0/1); Sharp (1/1) 79'; Pen: Roberts (3/5) 4', 11', 42' | Report | Try: O'Donnell 14' c Baker 28' c Elliot 33' c Renata 53' c Dixon 56' m Wilson 63' c Graham 72' c Willison 75' m Con: Ripia (5/7) 15', 29', 34', 64', 73'; Renata (1/1) 54' |

Castle Park, Doncaster
Attendance: 4,956
Referee: David Rose (England)

RFU Championship XV
| FB | 15 | (Zimbabwe) Dante Mama |
| RW | 14 | (England) Rhys Crane |
| OC | 13 | (England) Tim Streather |
| IC | 12 | (England) Charlie Hayter |
| LW | 11 | (England) Josh Bassett |
| FH | 10 | (England) Tristan Roberts | (substituted off) 69' |
| SH | 9 | (Wales) Gavin Cattle (c) | (substituted off) 54' |
| N8 | 8 | (England) Ben Pienaar |
| OF | 7 | (England) Phil Burgess | (substituted off) 56' |
| BF | 6 | (England) Jacob Rowan |
| RL | 5 | (England) Nic Rouse |
| LL | 4 | (England) Nathan Hannay | (substituted off) 49' |
| TP | 3 | (England) Alan Paver | (substituted off) 49' |
| HK | 2 | (England) Jon Vickers | (substituted off) 71' |
| LP | 1 | (England) Mark Irish | (substituted off) 56' |
Replacements:
| HK | 16 | (England) Mark Stagg | (substituted on) 71' |
| PR | 17 | (Wales) Tom Davies | (substituted on) 56' |
| PR | 18 | (England) Oliver Tomaszczyk | (substituted on) 49' |
| LK | 19 | (England) Calum Green | (substituted on) 49' |
| N8 | 20 | (England) Row Burrows | (substituted on) 56' |
| SH | 21 | (England) Luke Baldwin | (substituted on) 54' |
| FH | 22 | (England) Jake Sharp | (substituted on) 69' |
| WG | 23 | (England) Mark Atkinson |
Coach:
(Wales) Mike Rayer

Māori All Blacks
| FB | 15 | Trent Renata |
| RW | 14 | Kurt Baker |
| OC | 13 | Jackson Willison |
| IC | 12 | Tim Bateman | (substituted off) 44' |
| LW | 11 | Declan O'Donnell |
| FH | 10 | Willie Ripia |
| SH | 9 | Jamison Gibson-Park | (substituted off) 61' |
| N8 | 8 | Elliot Dixon |
| OF | 7 | Tanerau Latimer (c) |
| BF | 6 | Nick Crosswell | (substituted off) 46' |
| RL | 5 | Romana Graham |
| LL | 4 | Jarrad Hoeata | (substituted off) 54' |
| TP | 3 | Ben Afeaki |
| HK | 2 | Hika Elliot | (substituted off) 54' |
| LP | 1 | Jacob Ellison | (substituted off) 46' |
Replacements:
| HK | 16 | Quentin MacDonald | (substituted on) 54' |
| PR | 17 | Bronson Murray |
| PR | 18 | Ben May | (substituted on) 46' |
| LK | 19 | Jason Eaton | (substituted on) 54' |
| FL | 20 | Shane Christie | (substituted on) 46' |
| SH | 21 | Frae Wilson | (substituted on) 61' |
| CE | 22 | Charlie Ngatai | (substituted on) 44' |
| FB | 23 | Andre Taylor |
Coach:
(New Zealand) Jamie Joseph

Touch judges:
Steve Lee (England)
Simon McConnell (England)
Television match official:
Trevor Fisher (England)

=== Canada ===
23 November 2012
19:30 WET/GMT+0 (UTC+0)

| Canada | 19–32 | (Māori people) Māori All Blacks |
| Try: Barkwill 70' c Con: Braid (1/1) 71'; Pen: Pritchard (4/5) 24', 28', 39', 47' | Report | Try: Taylor 25' c Ngatai 79' c Con: Ripia (2/2) 26', 80'; Pen: Ripia (6/7) 2', 11', 14', 32', 49', 57' |

Oxford University Sports Centre, Oxford
Referee: Martin Fox (England)

Canada
| FB | 15 | James Pritchard | (substituted off) 63' |
| RW | 14 | Jeff Hassler |
| OC | 13 | Ciaran Hearn | (substituted off) 78' |
| IC | 12 | Phil Mackenzie |
| LW | 11 | Taylor Paris |
| FH | 10 | Connor Braid |
| SH | 9 | Phil Mack |
| N8 | 8 | Aaron Carpenter (c) |
| OF | 7 | Chauncey O'Toole | (substituted off) 58' |
| BF | 6 | Tyler Ardron |
| RL | 5 | Tyler Hotson | (substituted off) 58' |
| LL | 4 | Jebb Sinclair |
| TP | 3 | Andrew Tiedemann | (substituted off) 63' |
| HK | 2 | Ryan Hamilton | (substituted off) 43' |
| LP | 1 | Hubert Buydens |
Replacements:
| PR | 16 | Jason Marshall |
| HK | 17 | Ray Barkwill | (substituted on) 43' |
| PR | 18 | Doug Wooldridge | (substituted on) 63' |
| LK | 19 | Brett Beukeboom | (substituted on) 58' |
| FL | 20 | John Moonlight | (substituted on) 58' |
| FB | 21 | Eric Wilson |
| FH | 22 | Nathan Hirayama | (substituted on) 63' |
| WG | 23 | Sean Duke | (substituted on) 78' |
Coach:
(New Zealand) Kieran Crowley

Māori All Blacks
| FB | 15 | Trent Renata |
| RW | 14 | Kurt Baker |
| OC | 13 | Charlie Ngatai |
| IC | 12 | Tim Bateman | (yellow card) 52' to 62' |
| LW | 11 | Andre Taylor | | (substituted off) 70' |
| FH | 10 | Willie Ripia |
| SH | 9 | Frae Wilson | | (substituted off) 58' |
| N8 | 8 | Elliot Dixon | | (substituted off) 58' |
| OF | 7 | Tanerau Latimer (c) |
| BF | 6 | Shane Christie |
| RL | 5 | Romana Graham | (yellow card) 6' to 16' |
| LL | 4 | Jason Eaton | | (substituted off) 49' |
| TP | 3 | Ben May | | (substituted off) 58' |
| HK | 2 | Quentin MacDonald | | (substituted off) 49' |
| LP | 1 | Bronson Murray | | (substituted off) 40' |
Replacements:
| HK | 16 | Hika Elliot | | (substituted on) 49' |
| PR | 17 | Jacob Ellison | | (substituted on) 58' |
| PR | 18 | Ben Afeaki | | (substituted on) 40' |
| LK | 19 | Jarrad Hoeata | | (substituted on) 49' |
| FL | 20 | Nick Crosswell | | (substituted on) 58' |
| SH | 21 | Jamison Gibson-Park | | (substituted on) 58' |
| CE | 22 | Jackson Willison | | (substituted on) 70' |
| WG | 23 | Declan O'Donnell |
Coach:
(New Zealand) Jamie Joseph

Touch judges:
Ross Campbell (England)
Roger Baileff (England)

Notes:

- This was not considered a Test Match and is part of the new scheme the IRB introduced to increase the competitiveness in tier 2 teams ahead of the next World Cup.
- At the 21st minute, referee Martin Fox pulled a hamstring, prompting assistant referee Ross Campbell to take over as the official.

== Squad ==
It was announced that Highlanders head coach Jamie Joseph, would coach the side for the 2012 tour, after leading the Māori's to success over England in 2010.

Joseph named his 26-man squad on 29 October 2012.

Note: Flags indicate national union as has been defined under IRB eligibility rules. Players may hold more than one non-IRB nationality.

| Player | Position | Date of birth (age) | Club/province | Iwi |
|---|---|---|---|---|
| Hika Elliot | Hooker | 22 January 1986 (aged 26) | (New Zealand) Hawke's Bay | Ngāti Awa |
| Quentin MacDonald | Hooker | 25 September 1988 (aged 24) | (New Zealand) Tasman | Rangitāne |
| Ben Afeaki | Prop | 12 January 1988 (aged 24) | (New Zealand) North Harbour | Ngāti Awa |
| Jacob Ellison | Prop | 25 February 1985 (aged 27) | (New Zealand) Otago | Ngāti Porou |
| Ben May | Prop | 13 October 1982 (aged 30) | (New Zealand) Waikato | Ngāti Maniapoto |
| Bronson Murray | Prop | 6 November 1982 (aged 30) | (New Zealand) Bay of Plenty | Ngāpuhi |
| Jason Eaton | Lock | 21 August 1982 (aged 30) | (New Zealand) Taranaki | Ngāti Apa |
| Ross Filipo | Lock | 14 April 1979 (aged 33) | (New Zealand) Wellington | Muaūpoko |
| Romana Graham | Lock | 29 May 1986 (aged 26) | (New Zealand) Waikato | Ngāti Awa |
| Jarrad Hoeata | Lock | 12 December 1983 (aged 28) | (New Zealand) Taranaki | Ngāti Kahungunu |
| Shane Christie | Flanker | 23 September 1985 (aged 27) | (New Zealand) Tasman | Ngāti Kurī |
| Nick Crosswell | Flanker | 3 April 1986 (aged 26) | (New Zealand) Manawatu | Ngāti Porou |
| Tanerau Latimer (c) | Flanker | 6 May 1986 (aged 26) | (New Zealand) Bay of Plenty | Te Arawa |
| Karl Lowe | Flanker | 17 September 1984 (aged 28) | (New Zealand) Hawke's Bay | Ngāti Kahungunu |
| Elliot Dixon | Number 8 | 4 September 1989 (aged 23) | (New Zealand) Southland | Ngāpuhi |
| Jamison Gibson-Park | Scrum-half | 23 February 1992 (aged 20) | (New Zealand) Taranaki | Ngāti Porou / Ngāi Tai |
| Frae Wilson | Scrum-half | 9 February 1989 (aged 23) | (New Zealand) Wellington | Ngati Rangi / Te Āti Awa |
| Willie Ripia | Fly-half | 20 August 1985 (aged 27) | (New Zealand) Bay of Plenty | Ngāi Tūhoe |
| Tim Bateman | Centre | 3 June 1987 (aged 25) | (New Zealand) Wellington | Ngāi Tahu |
| Charlie Ngatai | Centre | 17 August 1990 (aged 22) | (New Zealand) Wellington | Ngāti Porou / Te Whanau-a-Apanui |
| Jackson Willison | Centre | 5 September 1988 (aged 24) | (New Zealand) Waikato | Ngāti Mahuta |
| Declan O'Donnell | Wing | 28 November 1990 (aged 21) | (New Zealand) Waikato | Ngāti Tūwharetoa / Ngāti Porou |
| Kade Poki | Wing | 17 January 1988 (aged 24) | (New Zealand) Southland | Te Āti Awa |
| Kurt Baker | Fullback | 7 October 1988 (aged 24) | (New Zealand) Taranaki | Ngāpuhi |
| Trent Renata | Fullback | 13 May 1988 (aged 24) | (New Zealand) Waikato | Ngāti Maru |
| Andre Taylor | Fullback | 11 January 1988 (aged 24) | (New Zealand) Taranaki | Ngāti Tuwharetoa / Ngāti Kahungunu |

=== Player statistics ===
Key

- Con: Conversions
- Pen: Penalties
- DG: Drop goals
- Pts: Points

| Name | Overall | | | | | | Cards | |
| Name | Played | Tries | Con | Pen | DG | Pts | Temporarily suspended | Red card |
|---|---|---|---|---|---|---|---|---|
| Willie Ripia | 3 | 0 | 10 | 7 | 0 | 41 | 0 | 0 |
| Charlie Ngatai | 3 | 2 | 0 | 0 | 0 | 10 | 0 | 0 |
| Frae Wilson | 3 | 2 | 0 | 0 | 0 | 10 | 0 | 0 |
| Trent Renata | 2 | 1 | 1 | 0 | 0 | 7 | 0 | 0 |
| Kurt Baker | 3 | 1 | 0 | 0 | 0 | 5 | 0 | 0 |
| Tim Bateman | 3 | 1 | 0 | 0 | 0 | 5 | 1 | 0 |
| Elliot Dixon | 3 | 1 | 0 | 0 | 0 | 5 | 0 | 0 |
| Hika Elliot | 3 | 1 | 0 | 0 | 0 | 5 | 0 | 0 |
| Romana Graham | 3 | 1 | 0 | 0 | 0 | 5 | 1 | R |
| Jackson Willison | 3 | 1 | 0 | 0 | 0 | 5 | 0 | 0 |
| Declan O'Donnell | 2 | 1 | 0 | 0 | 0 | 5 | 0 | 0 |
| Andre Taylor | 2 | 1 | 0 | 0 | 0 | 5 | 1 | 0 |
| Ben Afeaki | 3 | 0 | 0 | 0 | 0 | 0 | 0 | 0 |
| Shane Christie | 3 | 0 | 0 | 0 | 0 | 0 | 0 | 0 |
| Nick Crosswell | 3 | 0 | 0 | 0 | 0 | 0 | 0 | 0 |
| Jason Eaton | 3 | 0 | 0 | 0 | 0 | 0 | 0 | 0 |
| Jacob Ellison | 3 | 0 | 0 | 0 | 0 | 0 | 0 | 0 |
| Jamison Gibson-Park | 3 | 0 | 0 | 0 | 0 | 0 | 0 | 0 |
| Jarrad Hoeata | 3 | 0 | 0 | 0 | 0 | 0 | 1 | 0 |
| Tanerau Latimer | 3 | 0 | 0 | 0 | 0 | 0 | 0 | 0 |
| Quentin MacDonald | 3 | 0 | 0 | 0 | 0 | 0 | 0 | 0 |
| Ben May | 3 | 0 | 0 | 0 | 0 | 0 | 0 | 0 |
| Bronson Murray | 2 | 0 | 0 | 0 | 0 | 0 | 0 | 0 |
| Kade Poki | 1 | 0 | 0 | 0 | 0 | 0 | 0 | 0 |
| Ross Filipo | 0 | 0 | 0 | 0 | 0 | 0 | 0 | 0 |
| Karl Lowe | 0 | 0 | 0 | 0 | 0 | 0 | 0 | 0 |

== See also ==
- 2012 end-of-year rugby union tests
