= RFU Championship XV =

The RFU Championship XV is an invitational rugby union team composed of English qualified players from the second-tier competition, the RFU Championship. The team was originally formed for a one-off match against a strong Māori All Blacks team as part of the 2012 end-of-year rugby union tests. However, on 10 September 2014, it was announced that the team will be re-formed for an uncapped match against Canada for the 2014 end-of-year rugby union internationals.

The 2014 fixture will see Martin Haag, head coach of Nottingham, take over from Mike Rayer, Bedford Blues head coach, who led the XV side to a 52–21 loss in the Māori All Blacks fixture. On that occasion, the match was played on 17 November 2012 at Castle Park, as part of the 2012 Māori All Blacks tour of United Kingdom, where the Māori side won two from three matches; 24–32 loss to Leicester Tigers, 52–21 win over RFU Championship XV and finally a 32–19 win over the XV's next opponent Canada.

== Squads ==
=== 2014 Squad vs Canada ===
On 10 October, Martin Haag announced the first 21 players that would represent the team against Canada on 2 November.

On 16 October, James Phillips was added to the squad.

On 27 October, Haag added a further 2 players to the team, in Jonny Arr and Max Maidment.

^{1} It was later announced that Jonny Arr had replaced Ryan Glynn, who withdrew from the squad due to injury.

^{2} On 31 October, Kieran Hallett was added to the squad to replace Dan Mugford, who was forced to withdraw from the squad due to injury.

The final team to face Canada was announced on the 31 October.

- Head coach: (England) Martin Haag

Player	Position	Date of birth (Age)	Club	Union
Charlie Clare	Hooker	(22)	Bedford Blues	England
Tom Cruse	Hooker	30 March 1989 (25)	Rotherham Titans	England
Lee Imiolek	Prop	21 September 1990 (24)	Yorkshire Carnegie	England
Ryan Bower	Prop	25 February 1991 (23)	Worcester Warriors	England
Michael Holford	Prop	11 August 1982 (32)	Nottingham	England
Max Maidment	Prop	1 August 1991 (23)	London Scottish	England
Darren Barry	Lock	2 February 1990 (24)	Cornish Pirates	England
James Percival (c)	Lock	9 November 1983 (30)	Worcester Warriors	England
James Phillips	Lock	27 September 1987 (27)	London Scottish	England
Nick Fenton-Wells	Flanker	11 August 1986 (28)	Bedford Blues	South Africa
Marco Mama	Flanker	27 March 1991 (23)	Bristol	Zimbabwe
Mark Bright	Number eight	29 September 1978 (36)	London Scottish	England
Ryan Burrows	Number eight	25 April 1988 (26)	Yorkshire Carnegie	England
Jonny Arr	Scrum-half	29 November 1988 (25)	Worcester Warriors	England
Ryan Glynn ^{1}	Scrum-half	27 September 1991 (23)	Jersey	England
Tom Kessell	Scrum-half	21 January 1990 (24)	Cornish Pirates	England
Kieran Hallett	Fly-half	2 June 1985 (29)	Cornish Pirates	Ireland
Dan Mugford ^{2}	Fly-half	9 October 1991	Nottingham	England
Lawrence Rayner	Fly-half	13 July 1992 (22)	Plymouth Albion	England
Greg King	Centre	24 April 1988 (26)	Moseley	England
Will Owen	Centre	30 March 1995 (19)	Moseley	Wales
Dougie Flockhart	Wing	25 November 1984 (30)	Doncaster Knights	Scotland
Michael Keating	Wing	30 July 1989 (25)	Rotherham Titans	Ireland
Miles Mantella	Wing	7 October 1991 (23)	London Scottish	England
Jack Tovey	Fullback	16 December 1990 (21)	Bristol	Ireland

=== 2012 Squad vs Māori All Blacks ===
2012 Squad
Player	Position	Date of birth (Age)	Club	Union
Dan Baines	Hooker	4 August 1989 (26)	Rotherham Titans	England
Jon Vickers	Hooker	23 December 1988 (23)	Plymouth Albion	England
Oliver Tomaszczyk	Prop	24 November 1986 (25)	Newcastle Falcons	England
Mark Irish	Prop	25 August 1981 (31)	London Scottish	England
Tom Davies	Prop	17 April 1987 (25)	Doncaster Knights	Wales
Alan Paver	Prop	27 November 1977 (34)	Cornish Pirates	England
Calum Green	Lock	15 July 1990 (22)	Leeds Carnegie	England
Nathan Hannay	Lock	5 December 1984 (28)	Jersey	England
Nic Rouse	Lock	10 February 1981 (31)	Nottingham	England
Jacob Rowan	Flanker	14 January 1990 (22)	Leeds Carnegie	England
Phil Burgess	Flanker	1 July 1988 (24)	Cornish Pirates	England
Ben Pienaar	Number eight	10 September 1986 (26)	Moseley	England
Richard Mayhew	Number eight	24 June 1985 (27)	Newcastle Falcons	New Zealand
Luke Baldwin	Scrum-half	15 September 1990 (22)	Bedford Blues	England
Gavin Cattle (c)	Scrum-half	5 April 1980 (32)	Cornish Pirates	Wales
Tristan Roberts	Fly-half	23 March 1987 (25)	Bristol	England
Jake Sharp	Fly-half	7 May 1991 (21)	Bedford Blues	England
Charlie Hayter	Centre	10 December 1988 (23)	Moseley	England
Tim Streather	Centre	14 June 1988 (24)	Nottingham	England
Josh Bassett	Wing	17 March 1992 (20)	Bedford Blues	England
Jack Tovey	Wing	16 December 1990 (21)	Bristol	Ireland
Rhys Crane	Wing	14 October 1985 (27)	Nottingham	England
Dante Mama	Fullback	22 January 1990 (22)	Doncaster Knights	Zimbabwe

== Previous matches ==
=== Māori All Blacks (2012) ===
17 November 2012
12:05 WET/GMT+0 (UTC+0)

RFU Championship XV (England)	21–52	Māori All Blacks
Try: Mama 22' m Crane 78' c Con: Roberts (0/1); Sharp 79' (1/1)	Report	Try: O'Donnell 14' c Baker 28' c Elliot 33' c Renata 53' c Dixon 56' m Wilson 63' c Graham 72' c Willison 75' m Con: Ripia (5/7) 15', 29', 34', 64', 73'; Trent Renata (1/1) 54'

Castle Park, Doncaster
Attendance: 4,956
Referee: David Rose (England)

Team details

FB	15	(Zimbabwe) Dante Mama
RW	14	(England) Rhys Crane
OC	13	(England) Tim Streather
IC	12	(England) Charlie Hayter
LW	11	(England) Josh Bassett
FH	10	(England) Tristan Roberts	(substituted off) 69'
SH	9	(Wales) Gavin Cattle (c)	(substituted off) 54'
N8	8	(England) Ben Pienaar
OF	7	(England) Phil Burgess	(substituted off) 56'
BF	6	(England) Jacob Rowan
RL	5	(England) Nic Rouse
LL	4	(England) Nathan Hannay	(substituted off) 49'
TP	3	(England) Alan Paver	(substituted off) 49'
HK	2	(England) Jon Vickers	(substituted off) 71'
LP	1	(England) Mark Irish	(substituted off) 56'
Replacements:
HK	16	(England) Mark Stagg	(substituted in) 71'
PR	17	(Wales) Tom Davies	(substituted in) 56'
PR	18	(England) Oliver Tomaszczyk	(substituted in) 49'
LK	19	(England) Calum Green	(substituted in) 49'
N8	20	(England) Row Burrows	(substituted in) 56'
SH	21	(England) Luke Baldwin	(substituted in) 54'
FH	22	(England) Jake Sharp	(substituted in) 69'
WG	23	(England) Mark Atkinson
Coach:
(Wales) Mike Rayer

FB	15	Trent Renata
RW	14	Kurt Baker
OC	13	Jackson Willison
IC	12	Tim Bateman	(substituted off) 44'
LW	11	Declan O'Donnell
FH	10	Willie Ripia
SH	9	Jamison Gibson-Park	(substituted off) 61'
N8	8	Elliot Dixon
OF	7	Tanerau Latimer (c)
BF	6	Nick Crosswell	(substituted off) 46'
RL	5	Romana Graham
LL	4	Jarrad Hoeata	(substituted off) 54'
TP	3	Ben Afeaki
HK	2	Hika Elliot	(substituted off) 54'
LP	1	Jacob Ellison	(substituted off) 46'
Replacements:
HK	16	Quentin MacDonald	(substituted in) 54'
PR	17	Bronson Murray
PR	18	Ben May	(substituted in) 46'
LK	19	Jason Eaton	(substituted in) 54'
FL	20	Shane Christie	(substituted in) 46'
SH	21	Frae Wilson	(substituted in) 61'
CN	22	Charlie Ngatai	(substituted in) 44'
FB	23	Andre Taylor
Coach:
(New Zealand) Jamie Joseph

Touch judges:
(England) Steve Lee
(England) Simon McConnell
Television match official:
(England) Trevor Fisher

== Coaches ==
- Mike Rayer (2012) - Assisted by Ian Davies
- Martin Haag (2014) - Assisted by Kevin Maggs

== Captains ==
- (Wales) Gavin Cattle (2012)

== See also ==
- 2012–13 RFU Championship
- 2014–15 RFU Championship
- New Zealand Heartland XV
