= 2013 Chiefs (Super Rugby) season =

Chiefs
- 2013 season
- Head coach: Dave Rennie
- Captains: Craig Clarke; Liam Messam
- Stadium: Waikato Stadium, Hamilton; Baypark Stadium, Mount Maunganui; ECOLight Stadium, Pukekohe
- Overall Competition: 1st
- N.Z. Conference: 1st
- Play-offs: Champions
- Record: Won 14, Lost 4
- Top try scorer: All: Bundee Aki, Tim Nanai-Williams and Ben Tameifuna (6)
- Top points scorer: All: Gareth Anscombe (166)

2013 was a successful year for the Chiefs rugby team winning 12 of their Super rugby games to top the table and then went on to beat Crusaders in the Semi-final and Brumbies in the final. The Chiefs also became the New Zealand Conference winners and take out the BNZ Cup

== Standings ==
The final standings of the 2013 Super Rugby season were:

New Zealand Conference
Pos	Team	Rnd	W	D	L	Bye	PF	PA	PD	TF	TA	TB	LB	Pts
1	Chiefs	18	12	0	4	2	458	364	+94	50	38	8	2	66
2	Crusaders	18	11	0	5	2	446	307	+139	44	31	5	3	60
3	Blues	18	6	0	10	2	347	364	−17	40	36	6	6	44
4	Hurricanes	18	6	0	10	2	386	457	−71	41	49	4	5	41
5	Highlanders	18	3	0	13	2	374	496	−122	40	55	4	5	29

Overall Standings
Pos	Team	Rnd	W	D	L	Bye	PF	PA	PD	TF	TA	TB	LB	Pts
1	(New Zealand) Chiefs	18	12	0	4	2	458	364	+94	50	38	8	2	66
2	(South Africa) Bulls	18	12	0	4	2	448	330	+118	41	34	5	2	63
3	(Australia) Brumbies	18	10	2	4	2	430	295	+135	43	31	5	3	60
4	(New Zealand) Crusaders	18	11	0	5	2	446	307	+139	44	31	5	3	60
5	(Australia) Reds	18	10	2	4	2	321	296	+25	31	23	4	2	58
6	(South Africa) Cheetahs	18	10	0	6	2	382	358	+24	38	32	2	4	54
7	(South Africa) Stormers	18	9	0	7	2	346	292	+54	30	18	1	5	50
8	(South Africa) Sharks	18	8	0	8	2	384	305	+79	40	31	3	5	48
9	(Australia) Waratahs	18	8	0	8	2	411	371	+40	45	34	1	4	45
10	(New Zealand) Blues	18	6	0	10	2	347	364	−17	40	36	6	6	44
11	(New Zealand) Hurricanes	18	6	0	10	2	386	457	−71	41	49	4	5	41
12	(Australia) Rebels	18	5	0	11	2	382	515	−133	44	65	4	5	37
13	(Australia) Force	18	4	1	11	2	267	366	−99	26	34	0	5	31
14	(New Zealand) Highlanders	18	3	0	13	2	374	496	−122	40	55	4	5	29
15	(South Africa) Southern Kings	18	3	1	12	2	298	564	−266	27	69	2	0	24

== Results ==
The results of the Chiefs during the 2013 Super Rugby season were:

Round 2	22 February 2013	Highlanders	27–41	Chiefs	Forsyth Barr Stadium, Dunedin
	19:35	Try: Ben Smith 12'; Hosea Gear 38'; Kade Poki 48'; Con: Lima Sopoaga 13', 39', 49' (3/3); Pen: Lima Sopoaga 44', 57' (2/3)	Scoreboard	Try: Tim Nanai-Williams 15', 65'; Patrick Osborne 46'; Asaeli Tikoirotuma 61'; Con: Gareth Anscombe 16', 62', 66' (3/4); Pen: Gareth Anscombe 4', 21', 25', 70', 74' (5/5)	Attendance: 17,611; Referee: (Australia) Steve Walsh

Round 3	2 March 2013	Chiefs	45–3	Cheetahs	Waikato Stadium, Hamilton
	19:35	Try: Liam Messam 25'; Ben Afeaki 42'; Asaeli Tikoirotuma 64'; Gareth Anscombe 67'; Rhys Marshall 73'; Ben Tameifuna 79'; Con: Gareth Anscombe 26', 43', 65', 68', 74', 80' (6/6); Pen: Gareth Anscombe 18' (1/1)	Scoreboard	Pen: Johan Goosen 15' (1/4)	Attendance: 11,893; Referee: (New Zealand) Mike Fraser

Round 4	9 March 2013	Stormers	36–34	Chiefs	DHL Newlands Stadium, Cape Town
	17:05	Try: Gio Aplon 7', 38'; Nic Groom 52'; Con: Joe Pietersen 8', 39', 53' (3/3); Pen: Joe Pietersen 3', 15', 26', 33', 60' (5/5)	Scoreboard	Try: Charlie Ngatai 16', 56'; Tim Nanai-Williams 36'; Andrew Horrell 71'; Con: Gareth Anscombe 17', 37', 57', 72' (4/4); Pen: Gareth Anscombe 11', 46' (2/3); Cards: Tawera Kerr-Barlow (yellow card) 32' to 42'; Nick Crosswell (yellow card) 75'	Attendance: 37,178; Referee: (South Africa) Jaco Peyper

Round 5	15 March 2013	Southern Kings	24–35	Chiefs	Nelson Mandela Bay Stadium, Port Elizabeth
	19:10	Try: Sergeal Petersen 39'; Jacques Engelbrecht 61'; Con: Demetri Catrakilis 40' (1/2); Pen: Demetri Catrakilis 14', 28', 66', 72' (4/4)	Scoreboard	Try: Lelia Masaga 20', 31', 53'; Sam Cane 50'; Con: Gareth Anscombe 21', 51', 54' (3/4); Pen: Gareth Anscombe 10', 17', 79' (3/4); Cards: Augustine Pulu (yellow card) 60' to 70'	Attendance: 31,803; Referee: (South Africa) Stuart Berry

Round 6	22 March 2013	Chiefs	19–7	Highlanders	Waikato Stadium, Hamilton
	19:35	Try: Tim Nanai-Williams 8'; Con: Gareth Anscombe 9' (1/1); Pen: Gareth Anscombe 3', 25', 61', 69' (4/7)	Scoreboard	Try: Aaron Smith 20'; Con: Colin Slade 21' (1/1); Pen: Colin Slade (0/3); Cards: Jarrad Hoeata (yellow card) 23' to 34'	Attendance: 14,823; Referee: (New Zealand) Jonathon White

Round 7	30 March 2013	Chiefs	23–16	Blues	Baypark Stadium, Mount Maunganui
	19:35	Try: Ben Tameifuna 47'; Richard Kahui 63'; Con: Gareth Anscombe 48', 64' (2/2); Pen: Gareth Anscombe 20', 27', 37' (3/4); Drop: Aaron Cruden (0/1); Cards: Bundee Aki (yellow card) 8' to 19'	Scoreboard	Try: George Moala 77'; Con: Baden Kerr 78' (1/1); Pen: Chris Noakes 15', 39', 53' (3/4)	Attendance: 15,203; Referee: (South Africa) Jonathan Kaplan

Round 9	13 April 2013	Chiefs	23–31	Reds	Waikato Stadium, Hamilton
	16:35	Try: Bundee Aki 21'; Patrick Osborne 66'; Con: Gareth Anscombe 22', 67' (2/2); Pen: Gareth Anscombe 16', 43', 57' (3/4)	Scoreboard	Try: Rod Davies 6', 52'; Jake Schatz 27'; Quade Cooper 46'; Con: Quade Cooper 7', 28', 47', 53' (4/4); Pen: Quade Cooper 60' (1/3); Cards: Anthony Fainga'a (yellow card) 65' to 76'	Attendance: 16,428; Referee: (Australia) Steve Walsh

Round 10	19 April 2013	Waratahs	25–20	Chiefs	Allianz Stadium, Sydney
	19:40	Try: Cam Crawford 15'; Israel Folau 38'; John Ulugia 77'; Con: Brendan McKibbin 39', 78' (2/3); Pen: Brendan McKibbin 3', 51' (2/4); Cards: Sitaleki Timani (yellow card) 43' to 54'	Scoreboard	Try: Gareth Anscombe 47'; Ben Tameifuna 72'; Con: Gareth Anscombe 48', 73' (2/2); Pen: Gareth Anscombe 56', 62' (2/4); Charlie Ngatai (0/1)	Attendance: 15,451; Referee: (South Africa) Craig Joubert

Round 11	27 April 2013	Chiefs	37–29	Sharks	Waikato Stadium, Hamilton
	19:35	Try: Asaeli Tikoirotuma 9'; Bundee Aki 12'; Tim Nanai-Williams 16', 47'; Con: Gareth Anscombe 10', 13', 17', 47' (4/4); Pen: Gareth Anscombe 7', 53' (2/2); Aaron Cruden 81' (1/1)	Scoreboard	Try: Derick Minnie 22', 38'; Tera Mtembu 33'; Keegan Daniel 60'; Con: Patrick Lambie 23', 39', 61' (3/4); Pen: Patrick Lambie 79' (1/2)	Attendance: 11,713; Referee: (New Zealand) Chris Pollock

Round 12	3 May 2013	Rebels	33–39	Chiefs	AAMI Park, Melbourne
	19:40	Try: Scott Higginbotham 14'; Hugh Pyle 35', 63'; Nick Phipps 67'; Kurtley Beale 75'; Con: James O'Connor 15', 36', 64', 76' (4/5)	Scoreboard	Try: Gareth Anscombe 1', 20', 26'; Bundee Aki 9'; Sam Cane 50'; Brodie Retallick 69'; Con: Gareth Anscombe 10', 21', 51' (3/6); Pen: Gareth Anscombe 67' (1/1)	Attendance: 13,107; Referee: (New Zealand) Garratt Williamson

Round 13	10 May 2013	Chiefs	22–21	Force	ECOLight Stadium, Pukekohe
	19:35	Try: Lelia Masaga 15'; Con: Aaron Cruden 16' (1/1); Pen: Aaron Cruden 7', 19', 27', 38', 44' (5/5)	Scoreboard	Try: Patrick Dellit 3', 61'; Con: Jayden Hayward 62' (1/2); Pen: Jayden Hayward 30', 35', 58' (3/3); Sias Ebersohn (0/1); Cards: Kieran Longbottom (yellow card) 71'	Attendance: 5,112; Referee: (New Zealand) Mike Fraser

Round 14	17 May 2013	Hurricanes	12–17	Chiefs	Westpac Stadium, Wellington
	19:35	Pen: Beauden Barrett 4', 17', 32', 71' (4/4)	Scoreboard	Try: Tanerau Latimer 54'; Con: Aaron Cruden (0/1); Pen: Aaron Cruden 6', 11', 20', 36' (4/4); Cards: Ben Tameifuna (yellow card) 70'	Attendance: 12,998; Referee: (South Africa) Lourens van der Merwe

Round 15	24 May 2013	Chiefs	28–19	Crusaders	Waikato Stadium, Hamilton
	19:35	Try: Aaron Cruden 12'; Craig Clarke 29'; Bundee Aki 70'; Con: Aaron Cruden 13', 71' (2/3); Pen: Aaron Cruden 23', 53', 81' (3/4)	Scoreboard	Try: Matt Todd 18'; Con: Tom Taylor 19' (1/1); Pen: Tom Taylor 6', 38', 45', 49' (4/4)	Attendance: 22,187; Referee: (Australia) Steve Walsh

Round 18	28 June 2013	Chiefs	34–22	Hurricanes	Waikato Stadium, Hamilton
	19:35	Try: Matt Vant Leven 17'; Bundee Aki 26'; Tawera Kerr-Barlow 64'; Ben Tameifuna 74'; Con: Aaron Cruden 18', 27', 65', 75' (4/4); Pen: Aaron Cruden 8', 56' (2/3)	Scoreboard	Try: TJ Perenara 14'; Beauden Barrett 29'; Alapati Leiua 76'; Con: Beauden Barrett 15', 77' (2/3); Pen: Beauden Barrett 35' (1/2)	Attendance: 16,000; Referee: (New Zealand) Garratt Williamson

Round 19	5 July 2013	Crusaders	43–15	Chiefs	AMI Stadium, Christchurch
	19:35	Try: Kieran Read 40', 45'; Israel Dagg 42'; Ryan Crotty 57'; Tyler Bleyendaal 81'; Con: Dan Carter 40', 43', 82' (3/5); Pen: Dan Carter 4', 9', 14', 19' (4/4)	Scoreboard	Try: Asaeli Tikoirotuma 25'; Charlie Ngatai 73'; Con: Aaron Cruden (0/1); Andrew Horrell 74' (1/1); Pen: Aaron Cruden 11' (1/1)	Attendance: 18,000; Referee: (New Zealand) Jonathon White

Round 20	13 July 2013	Blues	16–26	Chiefs	Eden Park, Auckland
	19:35	Try: Charles Piutau 28'; Con: Baden Kerr 29' (1/1); Pen: Baden Kerr 7', 39', 44' (3/3); Cards: Kane Barrett (red card) 23'; Baden Kerr (yellow card) 47' to 60'	Scoreboard	Try: Bundee Aki 14'; Hika Elliot 35'; Ben Tameifuna 52', 63'; Con: Aaron Cruden (0/4); Pen: Aaron Cruden 9' (1/1); Gareth Anscombe 80' (1/1)	Attendance: 25,118; Referee: (New Zealand) Chris Pollock

Semi-Final	27 July 2013	Chiefs	20–19	Crusaders	Waikato Stadium, Hamilton
	19:35	Try: Lelia Masaga 51'; Aaron Cruden 57'; Con: Aaron Cruden 52', 58' (2/2); Pen: Aaron Cruden 21', 47' (2/3)	Scoreboard	Try: Israel Dagg 59'; Con: Dan Carter 60' (1/1); Pen: Dan Carter 6', 19', 28', 75' (4/6); Drop: Dan Carter (0/2)	Attendance: 24,000; Referee: (Australia) Steve Walsh

Final	3 August 2013	Chiefs	27–22	Brumbies	Waikato Stadium, Hamilton
	19:35	Try: Liam Messam 64'; Robbie Robinson 68'; Con: Aaron Cruden 69' (1/2); Pen: Aaron Cruden 23', 26', 32', 48', 72' (5/7); Drop: Gareth Anscombe (0/1)	Scoreboard	Try: Christian Lealiifano 38'; Con: Christian Lealiifano 39'; Pen: Christian Lealiifano 6', 8', 21', 46', 59' (5/5); Nic White (0/1); Jesse Mogg (0/1)	Attendance: 25,114; Referee: (South Africa) Craig Joubert

== Squad ==
The Chiefs squad for the 2013 Super Rugby season were:

2013 Chiefs squad
**Props**: (New Zealand) **Ben Afeaki**; (New Zealand) Josh Hohneck; (Tonga) Pauliasi Manu; (New Zealand) Solomona Sakalia; (Australia) **Toby Smith**; (New Zealand) Ben Tameifuna; **Hookers**: (New Zealand) **Hika Elliot**; (New Zealand) Mike Kainga; (New Zealand) Rhys Marshall; (Samoa) **Mahonri Schwalger**; **Locks**: (New Zealand) Craig Clarke (c); (New Zealand) **Ross Filipo**; (New Zealand) Michael Fitzgerald; (New Zealand) Romana Graham; (New Zealand) **Brodie Retallick**	**Loose forwards**: (New Zealand) **Sam Cane**; (New Zealand) Nick Crosswell; (New Zealand) **Tanerau Latimer**; (Samoa) Fritz Lee; (New Zealand) **Liam Messam** (c); (New Zealand) Matt Vant Leven; **Scrum-halves**: (Australia) **Tawera Kerr-Barlow**; (New Zealand) **Brendon Leonard**; (New Zealand) **Augustine Pulu**; **Fly-halves**: (New Zealand) **Aaron Cruden**; (New Zealand) Andrew Horrell; (New Zealand) Daniel Waenga	**Midfield**: (New Zealand) Bundee Aki; (New Zealand) **Richard Kahui**; (New Zealand) **Charlie Ngatai**; (Fiji) **Asaeli Tikoirotuma**; (New Zealand) Savenaca Tokula; **Wingers**: (New Zealand) **Lelia Masaga**; (New Zealand) **Tim Nanai-Williams**; (Fiji) **Patrick Osborne**; **Fullbacks**: (New Zealand) Gareth Anscombe; (New Zealand) Robbie Robinson
(c) denotes team captain, **Bold** denotes player is internationally capped.

== Player statistics ==
The Chiefs players' appearance and scoring statistics for the 2013 Super Rugby season are:

Player	Apps	Tries	Cons	Pens	DGs	Pts	YC	RC
Ben Afeaki	12	1	-	-	-	5	-	-
Bundee Aki	14	6	-	-	-	30	1	-
Gareth Anscombe	13	5	30	27	-	166	-	-
Sam Cane	17	2	-	-	-	10	-	-
Craig Clarke	14	1	-	-	-	5	-	-
Nick Crosswell	7	-	-	-	-	-	1	-
Aaron Cruden	18	2	10	24	-	102	-	-
Hika Elliot	16	1	-	-	-	5	-	-
Ross Filipo	2	-	-	-	-	-	-	-
Michael Fitzgerald	15	-	-	-	-	-	-	-
Romana Graham	1	-	-	-	-	-	-	-
Josh Hohneck	-	-	-	-	-	-	-	-
Andrew Horrell	11	1	1	-	-	7	-	-
Richard Kahui	4	1	-	-	-	5	-	-
Mike Kainga	3	-	-	-	-	-	-	-
Tawera Kerr-Barlow	13	1	-	-	-	5	1	-
Tanerau Latimer	18	1	-	-	-	5	-	-
Fritz Lee	5	-	-	-	-	-	-	-
Brendon Leonard	5	-	-	-	-	-	-	-
Pauliasi Manu	12	-	-	-	-	-	-	-
Rhys Marshall	9	1	-	-	-	5	-	-
Lelia Masaga	16	5	-	-	-	25	-	-
Liam Messam	17	2	-	-	-	10	-	-
Tim Nanai-Williams	12	6	-	-	-	30	-	-
Charlie Ngatai	14	3	-	-	-	15	-	-
Patrick Osborne	9	2	-	-	-	10	-	-
Augustine Pulu	16	-	-	-	-	-	1	-
Brodie Retallick	18	1	-	-	-	5	-	-
Robbie Robinson	10	1	-	-	-	5	-	-
Solomona Sakalia	-	-	-	-	-	-	-	-
Mahonri Schwalger	9	-	-	-	-	-	-	-
Toby Smith	11	-	-	-	-	-	-	-
Ben Tameifuna	17	6	-	-	-	30	1	-
Asaeli Tikoirotuma	18	4	-	-	-	20	-	-
Savenaca Tokula	2	-	-	-	-	-	-	-
Matt Vant Leven	9	1	-	-	-	5	-	-
Daniel Waenga	1	-	-	-	-	-	-	-
Total	18	54	41	51	-	505	5	-
