= List of 2016–17 RFU Championship transfers =

This is a list of player transfers involving RFU Championship teams before or during the 2016–17 season. The list is of deals that are confirmed and are either from or to a rugby union team in the Championship during the 2015–16 season. It is not unknown for confirmed deals to be cancelled at a later date.

== Bedford Blues ==
=== Players In ===
- (England) Will Carrick-Smith from (England) London Scottish
- (England) Jacob Fields from (England) Loughborough Students RUFC
- (England) Tom James from (England) Loughborough Students RUFC
- (Australia) Ben Adams from (England) Cambridge RUFC
- (England) Ed Taylor from (England) Loughborough Students RUFC
- (England) Christian Judge from (England) Plymouth Albion
- (Ireland) Tom Farrell from (Ireland) Leinster
- (Scotland) Jason Hill from (Scotland) Glasgow Warriors
- (England) Elliot Clements-Hill from (England) Ampthill
- (England) David Spelman from (England) Cambridge University RUFC

=== Players Out ===
- (England) Charlie Clare to (England) Northampton Saints
- (Canada) James Pritchard to (England) Coventry
- (England) Phil Boulton to (England) Coventry
- (South Africa) Nick Fenton-Wells to (England) Bristol Rugby
- (Ireland) Mark Flanagan to (England) Saracens
- (England) Tom Williams to (England) Rotherham Titans
- (England) Peter White to (England) Coventry
- (Wales) Steffan Jones to (England) Ampthill

== Cornish Pirates ==
=== Players In ===
- (England) Bar Bartlett from (England) Loughborough Students RUFC
- (Argentina) Nicolas de Battista from (Argentina) Jockey Club de Rosario
- (England) Edd Pascoe from (England) Redruth
- (Fiji) Timoci Kava from (England) Royal Navy

=== Players Out ===
- (New Zealand) Laurie McGlone retired
- (England) Craig Holland to (England) London Scottish
- (England) Joe Atkinson to (England) London Scottish
- (Canada) Aaron Carpenter to (England) London Welsh
- (England) Adam Jamieson retired
- (England) Marcus Garratt to (England) Wasps
- (Ireland) Kieran Hallett to (England) Plymouth Albion
- (Wales) Tom Riley to (Wales) Newport RFC
- (South Africa) Kieran Goss to (England) Chinnor
- (Wales) Rheon James to (Wales) Aberavon RFC
- (England) Will Graulich released

== Doncaster Knights ==
=== Players In ===
- (England) Lloyd Hayes from (England) Rotherham Titans
- (Wales) Jarad Williams from (England) Yorkshire Carnegie
- (Ireland) David Nolan from (France) Bourgoin
- (Ireland) Seán Scanlon from (England) Rotherham Titans
- (England) Harry Allen from (England) London Welsh
- (England) Ed Falkingham from (England) Hull Ionians
- (Scotland) Robin Hislop from (England) Rotherham Titans
- (Australia) Beau Robinson from (England) Harlequins

=== Players Out ===
- (England) Ollie Stedman to (England) Yorkshire Carnegie
- (England) Jake Armstrong to (England) Jersey Reds
- (England) Bevon Armitage to (England) Chinnor
- (England) Will Hurrell to (England) Bristol Rugby
- (Canada) Tyler Hotson to (England) Richmond
- (England) Brad Field retired
- (Canada) Jon Phelan released
- (Fiji) Viliame Veikoso released
- (England) Jack Bergmanas released
- (England) Ted Stagg released

== Ealing Trailfinders ==
=== Players In ===
- (England) Mark Bright from (England) London Scottish
- (England) Harry Casson from (England) Moseley
- (England) Luke Carter from (England) Rotherham Titans
- (England) Curtis Wilson from (England) Rotherham Titans
- (Ireland) William Ryan from (England) Rotherham Titans
- (England) Lewis Thiede from (England) Rotherham Titans
- (England) Mike McFarlane from (England) Rosslyn Park
- James Cordy-Redden from England Sevens
- (England) James Gibbons from (England) Gloucester Rugby
- (Argentina) Ignacio Saenz Lancuba from (England) Jersey Reds
- (Wales) Alex Davies from (England) London Welsh
- (England) Lewis Jones from (England) Leeds Met RFC
- (England) Liam Edwards from (England) Leeds Met RFC
- (England) Luke Peters from (England) Leeds Met RFC

=== Players Out ===
- (Australia) Harrison Orr to (England) Newcastle Falcons
- (England) James Stephenson to (England) Nottingham
- (England) Alex Davies to (England) Yorkshire Carnegie
- (Ireland) Eoghan Grace to (England) Coventry
- (England) Tom Wheatcroft to (England) Coventry
- (England) George Porter to (England) Cinderford
- (Ireland) Danny Kenny to (England) London Scottish
- (England) Paul Spivey to (England) Rosslyn Park
- (England) Toby Howley-Berridge to (England) Rosslyn Park
- (Wales) Nathan Buck to (Wales) Ebbw Vale
- (England) Nathan Hannay to (England) Chinnor
- (Ireland) Danny Barnes to (England) Oxford Harlequins
- (England) Tristan Roberts to (France) US Cognac
- (England) Michael Holford released
- (Ireland) Jamie Kilbane released
- (Scotland) Chris Kinloch released
- (England) James Love released
- (England) Sam Stanley released

== Jersey Reds ==
=== Players In ===
- (England) Mark Tampin from (England) Rotherham Titans
- (England) Max Argyle from (England) Rotherham Titans
- (England) Jordan Davies from (England) Rotherham Titans
- (England) George Eastwell from (England) Loughborough Students RUFC
- (England) Jake Armstrong from (England) Doncaster Knights
- (England) James Voss from (England) Hartpury College R.F.C.
- (Scotland) Jack Cuthbert from (Scotland) Edinburgh Rugby
- (New Zealand) James Doyle from (New Zealand) North Harbour
- (England) Sam Katz from (Spain) CR El Salvador
- (Wales) Marc Thomas from (Wales) Ospreys
- (New Zealand) Regan King from (Wales) Scarlets
- (Wales) Kieran Hardy from (Wales) Scarlets
- (England) George Watkins from (England) Bristol Rugby
- (Scotland) Jack Macfarlane from (Scotland) Glasgow Hawks

=== Players Out ===
- (England) Sam Lockwood to (England) Newcastle Falcons
- (England) Alex Rae retired
- (England) Ollie Evans to (England) Nottingham
- (England) Danny Herriott to (England) Rotherham Titans
- (England) Dave Markham to (France) Stade Rouennais
- (Argentina) Ignacio Saenz Lancuba to (England) Ealing Trailfinders
- (England) Oliver Tomaszczyk to (France) USA Perpignan
- (Argentina) Martín García Veiga to (France) RC Vannes
- (England) Aaron Penberthy to (Spain) CR El Salvador
- (Scotland) Tommy Spinks to (Scotland) Glasgow Hawks
- (Ireland) Mark McCrea to (Ireland) Malone
- (England) Mark Cooke to (England) Blackheath
- (Scotland) Russell Anderson released
- (England) Jack Burroughs released
- (England) Ed Dawson released
- (England) Ben Featherstone released
- (England) Jack Moates released
- (England) Rhys Owen released

== London Irish ==
=== Players In ===
- (England) Josh McNally from (England) London Welsh
- (New Zealand) James Marshall from (New Zealand) Hurricanes
- (New Zealand) Mike Coman from (Scotland) Edinburgh Rugby
- (England) Tommy Bell from (England) Leicester Tigers
- (Scotland) Greig Tonks from (Scotland) Edinburgh Rugby
- (South Africa) Sebastian de Chaves from (England) Leicester Tigers
- (Australia) Dave Porecki from (England) Saracens
- (England) Danny Hobbs-Awoyemi from (England) Northampton Saints
- (England) Max Northcote-Green from (England) Bath Rugby
- (Australia) Ollie Hoskins from (Australia) Western Force
- (England) Theo Brophy-Clews promoted from Academy
- (England) Johnny Williams promoted from Academy
- (Ireland) Jerry Sexton from (England) Exeter Chiefs
- (England) Ben Ransom from (England) Saracens
- (Ireland) Jason Harris-Wright from (Ireland) Connacht
- (England) Todd Gleave from (England) Rosslyn Park

=== Players Out ===
- (Ireland) Eoin Griffin to (Ireland) Connacht
- (Ireland) Ian Nagle to (Ireland) Leinster
- (England) Tom Cruse to (England) Wasps
- (England) Dominic Waldouck to (United States) Ohio Aviators
- (England) Jimmy Stevens to (England) Nottingham
- (England) Nic Rouse retired
- (Ireland) Eoin Sheriff to (England) London Scottish
- (England) Ollie Curry to (England) Rotherham Titans
- (Tonga) Halani Aulika to (England) Sale Sharks
- (Wales) Andy Fenby retired
- (England) Tom Guest retired
- (Scotland) Geoff Cross retired
- (Scotland) Sean Maitland to (England) Saracens
- (England) Jonny Harris to (England) London Scottish
- (England) George Skivington retired
- (England) Matt Symons to (England) Wasps
- (Tonga) Leo Halavatau to (France) Soyaux Angoulême
- (Wales) Rob McCusker to (Wales) Carmarthen Quins
- (England) Shane Geraghty to (England) Bristol Rugby
- (New Zealand) Chris Noakes released

== London Scottish ==
=== Players In ===
- (Scotland) Robbie Fergusson from (Scotland) Glasgow Warriors
- (Scotland) Jamie Stevenson from (England) Wasps
- (Scotland) Phil Cringle from (France) US Carcassonne
- (England) Craig Holland from (England) Cornish Pirates
- (England) George Cullen from (England) Oxford Harlequins
- (England) Ed Hoadley from (England) Southend Saxons
- (England) Joe Atkinson from (England) Cornish Pirates
- (Ireland) Eoin Sheriff from (England) London Irish
- (England) Dom McGeekie from (Wales) Cardiff Metropolitan RFC
- (Fiji) Ifereimi Boladau from (Wales) Ospreys
- (Scotland) Grant Shiells from (Scotland) Edinburgh Rugby
- (South Africa) Devlin Hope from (England) Coventry
- (England) Jonny Harris from (England) London Irish
- (Ireland) Danny Kenny from (England) Ealing Trailfinders
- (Ireland) Jack Cullen from (Ireland) Munster
- (Fiji) Dan Koroi from (Italy) Mogliano
- (Scotland) Ewan McQuillin from (Scotland) Edinburgh Rugby
- (Wales) Matt Marley from (Wales) Cardiff Blues
- (England) Ben Rath from (England) Rotherham Titans

=== Players Out ===
- (England) Chevvy Pennycook retired
- (England) Mark Bright to (England) Ealing Trailfinders
- (England) Will Carrick-Smith to (England) Bedford Blues
- (England) Max Maidment to (England) Yorkshire Carnegie
- (Canada) Evan Olmstead to (England) Newcastle Falcons
- (England) Adam Kwasnicki to (England) London Welsh
- (England) James Hallam to (England) London Welsh
- (Scotland) Josh Thomas-Brown to (England) London Welsh
- (Scotland) Oli Grove retired
- (Wales) Ben Calder to (England) Ampthill
- (England) Jimmy Litchfield to (England) Coventry

== London Welsh ==
=== Players In ===
- (Wales) Kristian Phillips from (Wales) Ospreys
- (England) Heath Stevens from (England) Worcester Warriors
- (England) Glyn Hughes from (England) Birmingham Moseley
- (England) Adam Kwasnicki from (England) London Scottish
- (England) James Hallam from (England) London Scottish
- (England) Lovejoy Chawatama from (England) Rosslyn Park
- (Scotland) Josh Thomas-Brown from (England) London Scottish
- (Canada) Aaron Carpenter from (England) Cornish Pirates
- (England) Barney Maddison from (England) Rotherham Titans
- (Wales) Josh Hodson from (Wales) Llandovery

=== Players Out ===
- (England) Guy Armitage to (England) Wasps
- (South Africa) Brendon Snyman to (England) Coventry
- (Canada) Richard Thorpe to (England) Chinnor
- (Wales) Josh Davies to (England) Ealing Trailfinders
- (England) Harry Allen to (England) Doncaster Knights
- (Tonga) Eddie Aholelei to (Romania) Timișoara Saracens
- (England) Olly Barkley to (Hong Kong) Kowloon RFC
- (England) Matt Corker to (England) Richmond
- (England) Josh McNally to (England) London Irish

== Nottingham ==
=== Players In ===
- (England) Jimmy Stevens from (England) London Irish
- (England) Ben Hooper from (England) Yorkshire Carnegie
- (England) Ollie Evans from (England) Jersey Reds
- (Ireland) Jordan Coghlan from (Ireland) Munster
- (England) James Stephenson from (England) Ealing Trailfinders
- (Ireland) Gearold Lyons from (Ireland) Munster
- (Ireland) Shane Buckley from (Ireland) Munster
- (England) Tom Holmes from (England) Rotherham Titans
- (England) Jacob Nash from (England) South Leicester

=== Players Out ===
- (Ireland) Conor Carey to (Ireland) Connacht
- (England) Dan Mugford to (England) Sale Sharks
- (Tonga) Viliame Iongi to (United States) San Francisco Rush
- (England) Rupert Cooper to (England) Plymouth Albion
- (Ireland) Ben Woods to (Ireland) Old Belvedere
- (Ireland) Sam Coghlan Murray to (Ireland) Terenure College
- (Ireland) Ricky Andrew to (Ireland) Bangor
- (Fiji) Oris Nawaqaliva to (England) Ampthill
- (New Zealand) Paul Grant to (England) Bath Rugby
- (England) Jon Vickers released

== Richmond ==
=== Players In ===
- (England) Rupert Harden from (Italy) Benetton Treviso
- (England) Matt Corker from (England) London Welsh
- (Canada) Tyler Hotson from (England) Doncaster Knights
- (England) Freddie Gabbitass from (England) Blackheath
- (Romania) Daniel Carpo from (Romania) Timișoara Saracens

== Rotherham Titans ==
=== Players In ===
- (England) Danny Herriott from (England) Jersey Reds
- (England) Miles Normandale from (Wales) Cardiff Blues
- (Wales) Joe Rees from (England) Worcester Warriors
- (England) Tom Williams from (England) Bedford Blues
- (England) Joe Graham from (England) Yorkshire Carnegie
- (England) Chad Thorne from (England) Coventry
- (Wales) Ian Williams from (England) Oxford Harlequins
- (Spain) Joe Hutchinson from (Spain) CR La Vila
- (England) Buster Lawrence from (England) Birmingham Moseley
- (Scotland) James Tyas from (England) Chinnor
- (England) Tom MacDonald from (England) Hartpury College R.F.C.
- (England) George Oliver from (England) Coventry
- (England) Ollie Curry from (England) London Irish
- (England) Luke Cole from (England) Gloucester Rugby
- (England) Tom Hicks from (England) Gloucester Rugby
- (England) Jack Ramshaw from (England) Yorkshire Carnegie
- (England) George Tresidder from (England) Leicester Tigers
- (England) Matt Dudman from (England) Yorkshire Carnegie
- (England) Charlie Foley from (England) Birmingham Moseley
- (England) Jake Henry from (England) Darlington Mowden Park
- (England) Dan Tai from (England) Yorkshire Carnegie
- (England) Cameron Hudson from (England) Wharfedale
- (Wales) Will Thomas from (Wales) Llandovery RFC
- Ben Foley from England Sevens
- (England) Matt Walsh from (England) Darlington Mowden Park

=== Players Out ===
- (England) Lloyd Hayes to (England) Doncaster Knights
- (England) Mark Tampin to (England) Jersey Reds
- (England) Max Argyle to (England) Jersey Reds
- (England) Jordan Davies to (England) Jersey Reds
- (Ireland) Sean Scanlon to (England) Doncaster Knights
- (England) Luke Carter to (England) Ealing Trailfinders
- (England) Curtis Wilson to (England) Ealing Trailfinders
- (Ireland) William Ryan to (England) Ealing Trailfinders
- (England) Lewis Thiede to (England) Ealing Trailfinders
- (England) Barney Maddison to (England) London Welsh
- (England) Joel Gill to (England) Darlington Mowden Park
- (England) Josh Redfern to (England) Macclesfield
- (England) James Elliott to (England) Birmingham Moseley
- (England) Jack Preece to (England) Birmingham Moseley
- (England) Tom Holmes to (England) Nottingham
- (Scotland) Robin Hislop to (England) Doncaster Knights
- (Wales) Darran Harris to (Wales) Newport Gwent Dragons
- (England) George Oram to (England) Birmingham Moseley
- (Ireland) Michael Cromie to (Ireland) Banbury RFC
- (England) Ben Rath to (England) London Scottish

== Yorkshire Carnegie ==
=== Players In ===
- (England) Ollie Stedman from (England) Doncaster Knights
- (Scotland) Steve McColl from (England) Gloucester Rugby
- (New Zealand) Richard Mayhew from (England) Newcastle Falcons
- (New Zealand) Michael Mayhew from (New Zealand) Waikato
- (England) Max Maidment from (England) London Scottish
- (Scotland) Ross Graham from (Scotland) Hawick RFC
- (England) Joe Ford from (England) Sale Sharks
- (England) Alex Davies from (England) Ealing Trailfinders
- Alex Gray from England Sevens
- (New Zealand) Jack Whetton from (France) Nevers
- (Scotland) Michael Cusack from (Scotland) Glasgow Warriors
- (South Africa) Warren Seals from (England) Darlington Mowden Park
- (England) Dan Sanderson from (England) Worcester Warriors

=== Players Out ===
- (Wales) Jarad Williams to (England) Doncaster Knights
- (England) Ben Hooper to (England) Nottingham
- (England) Joel Hodgson to (England) Newcastle Falcons
- (England) Kevin Sinfield retired
- (Scotland) Tom Ryder retired
- (England) David Doherty retired
- (England) Joe Graham to (England) Rotherham Titans
- (England) Jack Ramshaw to (England) Rotherham Titans
- (England) Matt Dudman to (England) Rotherham Titans
- (England) Dan Tai to (England) Rotherham Titans
- (England) Jack Walker to (England) Bath Rugby
- (England) Chris Jones retired
- (England) James Tideswell to (England) Cinderford
- (England) Fred Burdon to (England) Newcastle Falcons
- (England) Chris Pilgrim released
- (England) Jack Barnard released

== See also ==
- List of 2016–17 Premiership Rugby transfers
- List of 2016–17 Pro12 transfers
- List of 2016–17 Super Rugby transfers
- List of 2016–17 Top 14 transfers
