= Rhett Ellison =

American football player (born 1988)

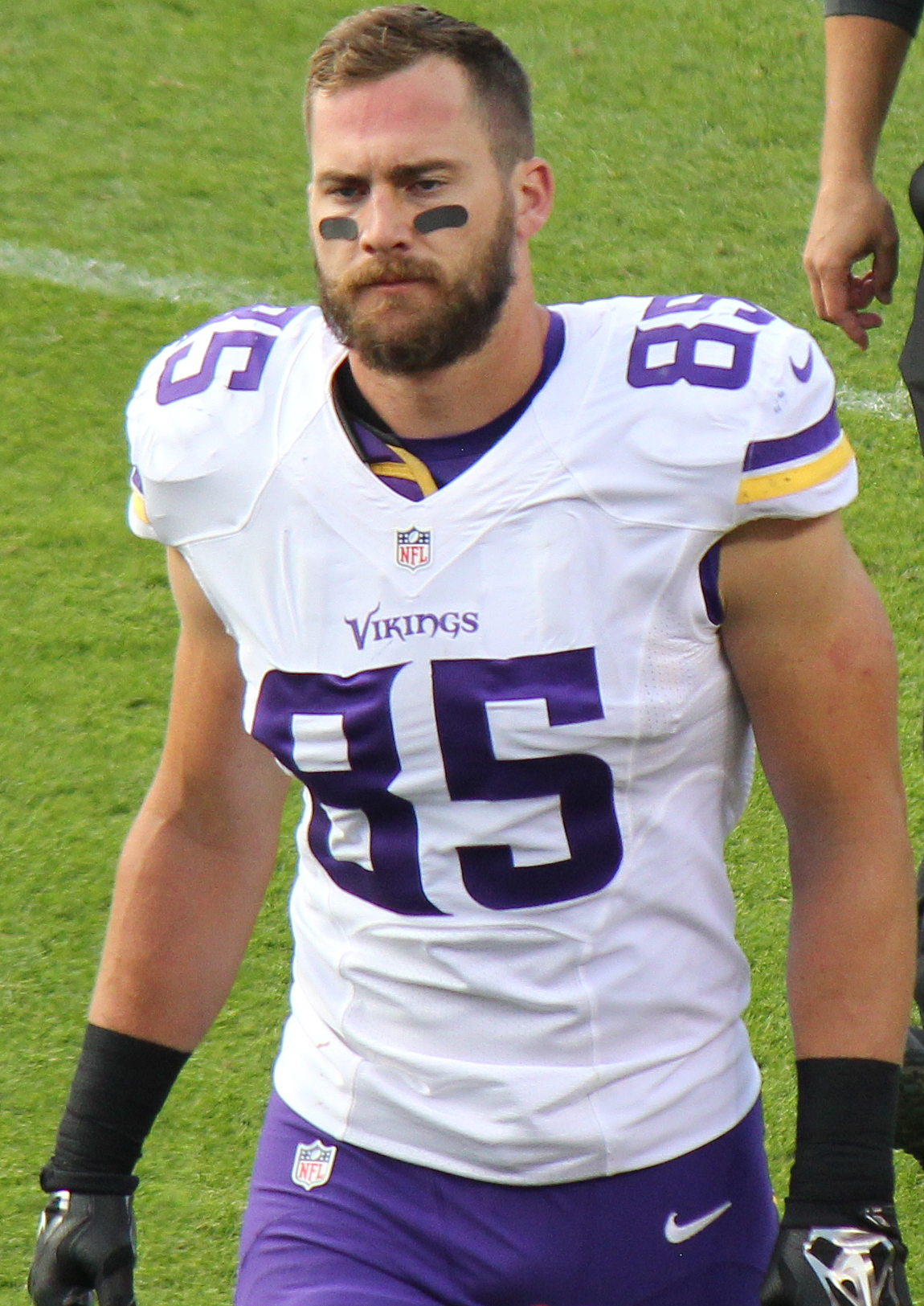
- Ellison with the Minnesota Vikings in 2015

No. 40, 85
- Positions: Tight end, fullback

Personal information
- Born: October 3, 1988 (age 38); Portola Valley, California, U.S.
- Listed height: 6 ft 5 in (1.96 m)
- Listed weight: 255 lb (116 kg)

Career information
- High school: Saint Francis (Mountain View, California)
- College: USC (2007–2011)
- NFL draft: 2012: 4th round, 128th overall pick

Career history
- Minnesota Vikings (2012–2016); New York Giants (2017–2019)

Awards and highlights
- First-team All-Pac-12 (2011)

Career NFL statistics
- Receptions: 118
- Receiving yards: 1,189
- Receiving touchdowns: 7
- Rushing yards: 1
- Rushing touchdowns: 1
- Stats at Pro Football Reference

Rhett Marshall Ellison (born October 3, 1988) is an American former professional football player who was a tight end and fullback for eight seasons in the National Football League (NFL). He played college football for the USC Trojans and was selected by the Minnesota Vikings in the fourth round of the 2012 NFL draft. He also played for the New York Giants for three seasons.

== Early life ==
Ellison played high school football at Saint Francis High School in Mountain View, California. As a junior in 2005, he made 27 tackles and 4 sacks, plus caught 26 passes for 301 yards (11.6 avg.) with 5 touchdowns. As a senior, he had 49 tackles, 2 sacks and 1 interception on defense and 31 receptions for 394 yards (12.7 avg.) with 2 touchdowns on offense. His 2006 season honors included 2006 Super Prep All-Farwest, Prep Star All-West, Long Beach Press-Telegram Best of the Rest, San Francisco Chronicle All-Metro honorable mention and San Jose Mercury News All-Area first team playing linebacker and tight end.

Both major recruiting rating agencies of the time, Rivals.com and Scout.com, rated Ellison as a three star (out of five) recruit and in the top 20 among other tight ends in his class. He was recruited by several BCS conference programs and, beside USC, received athletic scholarship offers from Arizona State, Cal, Oregon and Virginia Tech. He committed to USC on February 6, 2007, the day before National Signing Day, a part of a recruiting class that ranked in the top two in the country in 2007.

== College career ==
Ellison redshirted the 2007 season, his freshman year with the Trojans.

As a redshirt freshman in 2008, Ellison served as an often-used backup tight end. Overall for the season, while appearing in 9 games (all but Oregon, Arizona State, Washington State and Arizona), he had 4 receptions for 58 yards (14.5 avg.) and a tackle. He started the UCLA and Penn State games at fullback and split time between there and tight end in those games. He broke his right foot prior to the Oregon game and missed those next 4 contests while recuperating. In 2009, Ellison appeared in all 13 games, serving as a regularly used backup tight end while also making plays on special teams as a sophomore. For the season, he had 6 catches for 41 yards (6.8 avg.) with 1 touchdown, plus made 4 |tackles. As a junior in 2010, Ellison started all season at tight end, hauling in 21 catches for 239 yards (11.4 avg.) with 3 touchdowns, and also made 3 tackles. He made 2010 All-Pac-12 honorable mention.

The steady Ellison, equally proficient as a blocker and pass catcher, started at tight end for his second season as a senior in 2011, but also saw time at fullback. Ellison was captain of the Trojans in 2011 and an award was created to honor his leadership and determination, called the Rhett Ellison "Machine" Trojan Way Leadership Award.

== Professional career ==
=== Pre-draft ===
Pre-draft measurables
Height	Weight	Arm length	Hand span	Wingspan	40-yard dash	10-yard split	20-yard split	20-yard shuttle	Three-cone drill	Vertical jump	Broad jump
6 ft 4 7/8 in (1.95 m)	251 lb (114 kg)	32 3/4 in (0.83 m)	10 1/4 in (0.26 m)	6 ft 7 in (2.01 m)	4.69 s	1.63 s	2.77 s	4.39 s	7.16 s	32.5 in (0.83 m)	9 ft 3 in (2.82 m)
All values from NFL Combine/Pro Day

Ellison was invited to the 2012 NFL Combine as a fullback.

=== Minnesota Vikings ===
Ellison was taken in the fourth round of the 2012 NFL draft, 128th pick overall, by the Minnesota Vikings. He was not expecting to be drafted, and as such was on a river excursion and not watching the draft when the Vikings called him to let him know he was about to be selected; the surprise was such that he cried in joy. Trojan teammate and 4th pick overall Matt Kalil was also selected by the Vikings in the first round. He is the second player of Maori heritage to play for the Vikings since David Dixon.

On November 24, 2013, Ellison scored his first career touchdown catch against the Green Bay Packers. He scored the third tight end rushing touchdown in franchise history in 2016.

=== New York Giants ===
On March 10, 2017, Ellison signed a four-year, $18 million contract with the New York Giants. He started the year as the backup tight end to Evan Engram. He also took snaps at fullback. On September 10, 2017, in the Giants' season opening 19–3 loss to the Dallas Cowboys on NBC Sunday Night Football, Ellison had one reception for nine yards in his Giants debut. In a Week 5 loss to the Tampa Bay Buccaneers, he caught his first touchdown as a Giant. On December 27, 2019, Ellison was placed on injured reserve with a concussion. He finished the season with 18 catches for 167 yards and one touchdown through 10 games.

=== Retirement ===
On March 9, 2020, Ellison announced his retirement from football.

== Personal life ==
He is the son of three-time Super Bowl champion Riki Ellison, a former USC and NFL linebacker. Ellison is of partial Māori, specifically Ngāi Tahu, descent and is the grandnephew of the first captain of the All Blacks, Thomas Ellison, who led New Zealand on their first tour to Australia in 1893. He is also related to former New Zealand rugby union players Jacob Ellison and Tamati Ellison. Ellison completed a bachelor's degree in international relations from USC and a master's degree in communication management. Ellison is married to fashion model Raina Hein, runner-up of season 14 of America's Next Top Model, and have two children together.
