= Luke Baldwin (disambiguation) =

Luke Baldwin may refer to:

- Luke Baldwin (rugby union)
- Luke Baldwin (racing driver)
