= Tamati Ellison =

NZ international rugby union player

- Born: Tamati Edward Ellison; 1 April 1983 (age 43) Wellington, New Zealand
- Height: 1.84 m (6 ft 0 in)
- Weight: 95 kg (14 st 13 lb; 209 lb)
- School: Mana College, Porirua
- University: Victoria University of Wellington
- Notable relative: Vincent Bevan (grandfather) Jacob Ellison (brother)

Rugby union career
- Position: Utility back
Senior career
Years	Team	Apps	(Points)
2010–2018	Ricoh Black Rams	57	(96)
- Correct as of 18 August 2017
Provincial / State sides
Years	Team	Apps	(Points)
2003–2009	Wellington Lions	45	(89)
2012	Otago	6	(5)
- Correct as of 4 November 2012
Super Rugby
Years	Team	Apps	(Points)
2005	Blues	1	(0)
2006–2010	Hurricanes	53	(35)
2012–2013	Highlanders	23	(30)
2014–2016	Rebels	36	(10)
- Correct as of 21 July 2016
International career
Years	Team	Apps	(Points)
2009–2012	New Zealand	4	(0)
2007–2009	Junior All Blacks		
2008	NZ Maori		
2005	NZ Sevens		
2003–2004	NZ U-21		
2002	NZ U-19		
- Correct as of 12 November 2012
Medal record
Men's rugby sevens
Representing New Zealand
Commonwealth Games
Gold medal – first place	2006 Melbourne	Team competition

Tamati Edward Ellison (born 1 April 1983) is a New Zealand rugby union coach and former player.

== Career ==
=== Domestic ===
Ellison was born in Wellington, and made his debut for the Wellington Lions in the 2003 NPC final defeat against Auckland. He also captained the Lions during the 2007 Air New Zealand Cup, leading them to the final where they were once again defeated by Auckland. He was named as Wellington's Player of the Year for 2007.

He made his Super Rugby debut in 2005 for the Blues after being called into their squad as an injury replacement and appearing as a substitute in their final match of the season against the New South Wales Waratahs. He made his Hurricanes debut in 2006 and went on to make 10 appearances that season, all coming from the bench. His run-on debut came against the Chiefs in 2007. He made his 50th Super Rugby appearance during the 2010 season.

In March 2010, he confirmed he had activated a get-out clause in his NZRU contract to sign a three-year deal to play for the Ricoh Black Rams in the Top League. His agent reported that the deal was made in order to secure the financial future of Ellison's family.

In 2011, it was confirmed that Ellison had signed with the Highlanders for the 2012 and 2013 seasons. In March 2013, it was announced that he had resigned for the Ricoh Black rams for the 2013–14 Top League season.

In September 2013, it was announced that Ellison had signed with the Rebels for the 2014 season, reuniting with former teammates Telusa Veainu and Scott Fuglistaller.

=== International ===
Ellison captained the Junior All Blacks to victory in the 2009 Pacific Nations Cup, a year after winning the 2008 edition as co-captain of the New Zealand Maori, alongside Liam Messam.

He was chosen as one of four new caps for the All Blacks 2009 end of year tour to Europe and made his first test appearance in the 20–6 victory against Italy in Milan.

As well as the All Blacks, Junior All Blacks and the New Zealand Maori, he played for the New Zealand Sevens, and represented New Zealand at U-21 and U-19 levels. He was part of the New Zealand Sevens team that won a gold medal at the 2006 Commonwealth Games in Melbourne.

== Personal life ==
=== Family ===
He is the grandson of All Black Vince Bevan, who played six tests for New Zealand between 1949 and 1950, and son of rugby coach Eddie Ellison. He is the older brother of Jacob Ellison, who plays prop for the Fukuoka Sanix Blues. He is related to former American football player Riki Ellison who played in the NFL for the San Francisco 49ers and the Los Angeles Raiders and to former NFL player Rhett Ellison who played for the New York Giants. He is also a descendant of Thomas Ellison, captain of New Zealand's first official rugby team in 1893 and a member of the New Zealand Natives football team which toured Great Britain and Australia in 1888–89.

=== Marriage ===
In June 2011 he married Meremaraea Cowan at a vineyard in Martinborough. He first saw a picture of Meremaraea when he was a teenager at the home of his rugby coach, who also happened to be her uncle. Instead of wedding gifts they requested that guests donate to the Red Cross appeals for the Christchurch earthquake and the disaster in Japan. They have six children.

== Super Rugby statistics ==
As of 21 July 2016

Season	Team	Games	Starts	Sub	Mins	Tries	Cons	Pens	Drops	Points	Yel	Red
2005	Blues	1	1	0	79	0	0	0	0	0	0	0
2006	Hurricanes	8	0	8	151	0	0	0	0	0	0	0
2007	Hurricanes	11	3	8	405	0	0	0	0	0	0	0
2008	Hurricanes	10	5	5	441	0	0	0	0	0	0	0
2009	Hurricanes	13	11	2	886	6	0	0	0	30	0	0
2010	Hurricanes	11	11	0	828	1	0	0	0	5	0	0
2012	Highlanders	15	15	0	1186	2	0	0	0	10	0	0
2013	Highlanders	8	8	0	633	4	0	0	0	20	1	0
2014	Rebels	15	15	0	1161	1	0	0	0	5	1	0
2015	Rebels	11	11	0	788	0	0	0	0	0	0	0
2016	Rebels	10	10	0	759	1	0	0	0	5	0	0
Total		113	90	23	7317	15	0	0	0	75	2	0
