= Ben Tameifuna =

Tonga international rugby union player

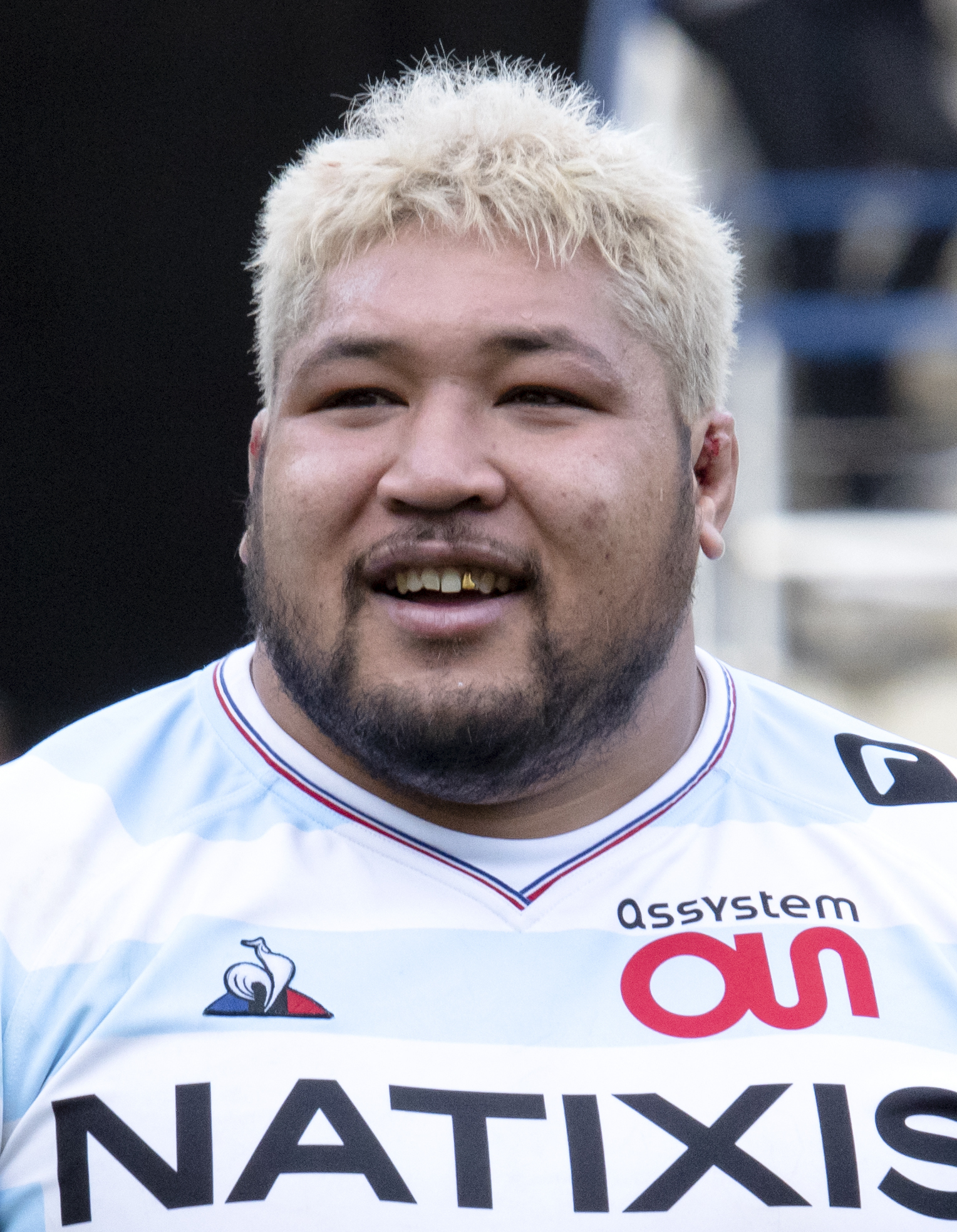
- Tameifuna with Racing 92 in 2019
- Full name: Benjamin Vainga Charles Tameifuna
- Born: 30 August 1991 (age 35) Auckland, New Zealand
- Height: 1.83 m (6 ft 0 in)
- Weight: 151 kg (333 lb; 23 st 11 lb)
- School: Hastings Boys' High School
- Notable relative: Sona Taumalolo (uncle)

Rugby union career
- Position: Prop
- Current team: Bordeaux Bègles
Senior career
Years	Team	Apps	(Points)
2010–2012	Hawke's Bay	14	(5)
2012–2015	Chiefs	65	(45)
2013–2015	Waikato	21	(10)
2015–2020	Racing 92	106	(25)
2020–	Bordeaux Bègles	74	(25)
- Correct as of 28 August 2023
International career
Years	Team	Apps	(Points)
2011	New Zealand U20	4	(5)
2017–	Tonga	30	(10)
- Correct as of 28 August 2023

Benjamin Vainga Charles Tameifuna (Tongan: [dɑːmeɪfʊnɑː]; born 30 August 1991) is a professional rugby union player who plays as a prop for Top 14 club Bordeaux Bègles. Born in New Zealand, he represents Tonga at international level after qualifying on ancestry grounds.

== Club career ==
Tameifuna made his Hawke Bay's debut as a teenager in 2010. He represented the New Zealand under 20s at the 2011 IRB Junior World Championship, and in March 2012 he made his Chiefs debut after an injury sidelined Ben Afeaki. In 2013, he signed a contract extension with the Chiefs until 2014.

After four years with the Chiefs, in June 2015 Tameifuna signed with Racing 92, who changed their name from Racing Metro in the same month. They are based in Paris and are part of the French Top 14.

On 14 May 2020, Tameifuna left Racing 92 to sign for French rivals Bordeaux from the 2020–21 season.

== International career ==
In May 2012 he was selected for the All Blacks to train for the three Test series against Ireland. At over 130 kg, he was the heaviest member of the All Black squad. Tameifuna was not capped for New Zealand.

Tameifuna made his international debut for Tonga against Wales on 16 June 2017. Tameifuna was first in their squad for the 2016 European tour but was not capped on that tour.

== Personal life ==
Tameifuna's uncle Sona Taumalolo was another Chiefs prop, who also played for Tonga at the 2011 Rugby World Cup. In July 2012, with hooker Mahonri Schwalger from Samoa, the two props combined for 60 minutes to help the Chiefs beat the Crusaders 20–17, at Waikato Stadium in Hamilton. When Tameifuna signed to play in France, Taumalolo was already playing there, for FC Grenoble. They played in the same squad for Tonga in one match in 2021 against the Cook Islands, but didn't play together, with Ben being substituted in the 62nd minute, 8 minutes before his Uncle came on.

== Honours ==
Chiefs

- 2× Super Rugby: 2012, 2013

Racing 92

- 1× Top 14: 2016

Bordeaux Bègles

- 2× European Rugby Champions Cup: 2025, 2026
