= Adam Coleman =

Australian rugby union player

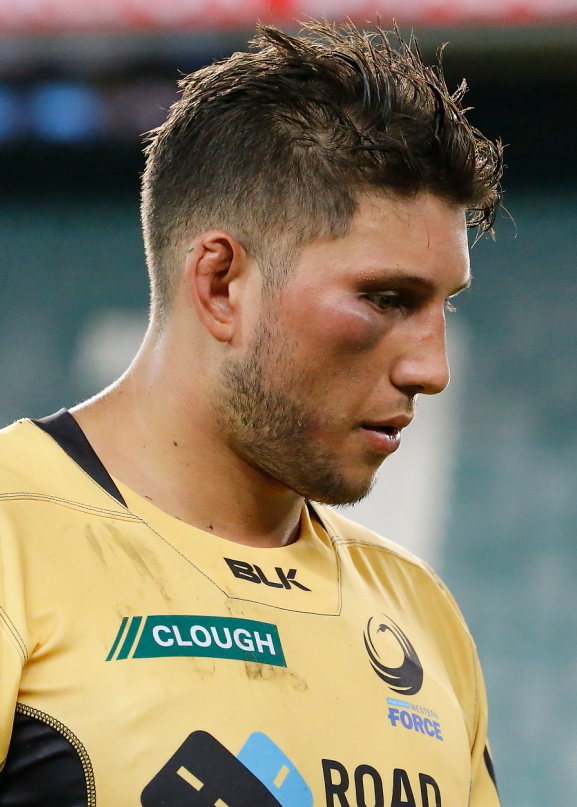
- Coleman representing the Force during Super Rugby
- Born: 7 October 1991 (age 35) Hobart, Tasmania, Australia
- Height: 2.04 m (6 ft 8 in)
- Weight: 122 kg (269 lb; 19 st 3 lb)
- School: New Town High School
- Notable relative(s): Rodney Blake (cousin); Inoke Afeaki (cousin); Ben Afeaki (cousin); Frank Afeaki (cousin)

Rugby union career
- Position: Lock
- Current team: Bordeaux Bègles
Senior career
Years	Team	Apps	(Points)
2010–2011	Uni-Norths Owls	24	(0)
2011–2013	Parramatta Two Blues	15	(20)
2014–2017	Force	49	(10)
2018–2019	Rebels	22	(0)
2019–2023	London Irish	39	(20)
2023–	Bordeaux Bègles	27	(15)
- Correct as of 4 January 2025
International career
Years	Team	Apps	(Points)
2016–2019	Australia	38	(20)
2023–	Tonga	5	(0)
- Correct as of 19 July 2023

Adam Coleman (born 7 October 1991) is a professional rugby union player who plays as a lock for Top 14 club Bordeaux Bègles. Born in Australia, he represents Tonga at international level after qualifying on ancestry grounds.

== Early life and education ==
Coleman is of Tongan descent and is the son of former Tongan rugby captain Pau'u Lolohea-Afeaki and first cousin of former Wallaby Rodney Blake. Coleman is also cousins with former Hurricane Inoke Afeaki who also captained Tonga, New Zealand All Black Ben Afeaki and Australian women's basketball player Eva Afeaki.

Coleman attended New Town High School in Hobart Tasmania. He represented Tasmania in under 14s, 16s, and 18s. Coleman played under 18s at the national championships and was then selected in the combined states team that lost to Queensland in the final of the division one championship. Coleman was spotted by the ACT Brumbies academy and moved to Canberra in 2010. In 2011, Coleman was selected in the national academy and moved to Sydney to sign with Shute Shield team Parramatta Two Blues.

== Rugby Club career ==
Coleman earned his big break in senior rugby during the 2013 Super Rugby season when he was called up to the Waratahs squad for their match against the Force. The encounter took place during the 2013 British & Irish Lions tour to Australia and the Waratahs were ravaged by international call-ups. Nonetheless, they were able to triumph 28–13 with Coleman debuting as a 70th-minute substitute for Will Skelton.

He made no further appearances that season, and moved west for 2014 and was named as a member of the Force's extended playing squad.

Coleman made his starting debut for the Western Force on Good Friday 18 April 2014 at AAMI Park against the Melbourne Rebels.

== International career ==
In 2016, Coleman was named in the Wallabies preliminary 39-man squad for the 2016 series against England. He made his debut as a replacement in the third test.

== Personal life ==
Coleman and his wife Tonia have 3 children.

== Career statistics ==
=== Club summary ===
Year	Team	Played	Start	Sub	Tries	Cons	Pens	Drop	Points	Yel	Red
2013	Waratahs	1	0	1	0	0	0	0	0	0	0
2014	Force	14	5	9	0	0	0	0	0	2	0
2015	Force	12	11	1	1	0	0	0	5	1	0
2016	Force	12	12	0	0	0	0	0	0	0	0
2017	Force	11	9	2	1	0	0	0	5	0	0
2018	Rebels	12	12	0	0	0	0	0	0	0	0
2019	Rebels	10	9	1	0	0	0	0	0	1	0
Career		72	58	14	2	0	0	0	10	4	0

as of 16 June 2019

== Honours ==
Bordeaux Bègles

- 1× European Rugby Champions Cup: 2025
