= Mana College =

Location
- 22 Awarua Street, Takapuwahia, Porirua, Wellington, New Zealand; 41.1279°S 174.8314°E

Information
- Type: Co-educational state secondary (Year 9–13)
- Motto: "Akona Te Mahi Pai" – Learn to Work Well
- Established: 1957
- Ministry of Education Institution no.: 254
- Principal: Jeff Chapman
- Enrolment: 511 (July 2026)
- Socio-economic decile: 3G
- Website: mana.school.nz

Mana College is a decile two secondary school in Porirua, Wellington, New Zealand. It celebrated its Golden Jubilee in 2007.

== History ==
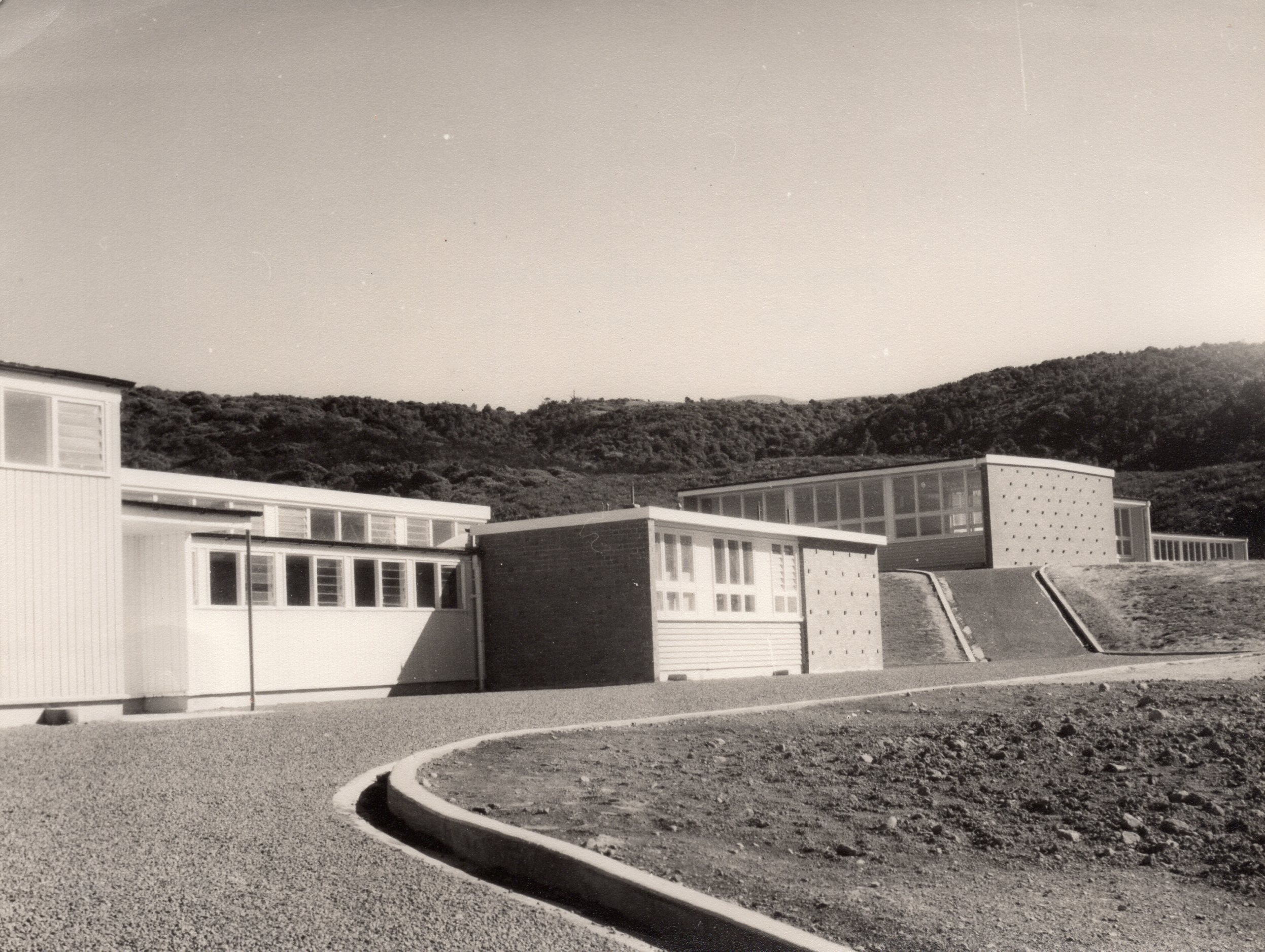
Mana College in 1958

In recent years, the college has introduced Pathways, a system to help students achieve in areas they need for either trade courses or further tertiary education.

In December 2018 the minister announced that $15 million was to be allocated for redevelopment and replacing old buildings at the college, although this includes $9 million already allocated by the previous government.

In 2024 students successfully raised more than $72,000 for the first school trip to Europe.

== Notable alumni ==
- Michael Campbell – professional golfer
- Noel Crombie – artist and musician
- Jacob Ellison – rugby union player
- Tamati Ellison – rugby union player
- Gary Knight – rugby union player
- Gary McCormick – radio and television personality
- Leone Patterson – basketball player
- TJ Perenara – rugby union player
- Rob Ruha – musician
- Tina Salu – association footballer
- Elvis Seveali'i – rugby union player
- Emmett Skilton – actor
- Rodney So'oialo – rugby union player
- Steven So'oialo – rugby union player

== Notable teachers ==
- Sam Hunt - poet
- Robyn Kahukiwa - artist
- Robin White - artist
