= Marco Mama =

- Born: Marco Mama; 27 March 1991 (age 35) Kaduna, Nigeria
- Height: 1.87 m (6 ft 2 in)
- Weight: 109 kg (17 st 2 lb)

Rugby union career
- Position: Flanker
Senior career
Years	Team	Apps	(Points)
2009–2015	Bristol Rugby	106	(110)
2015–	Worcester Warriors	70	(40)
- Correct as of 18 May 2021
International career
Years	Team	Apps	(Points)
2010–2011	Zimbabwe U20		
2014	RFU Championship XV		
- Correct as of 18 May 2021

Marco Mama (born 27 March 1991) is a Zimbabwe rugby union player who plays for Worcester Warriors in the Gallagher Premiership.

== Club career ==
Mama was initially registered with Bristol as part of the Elite Player Development Group before joining their senior academy in 2009. Originally, he joined local rivals Worcester Warriors on a season-loan in the 2015–16 season. But, he signed a permanent deal with Worcester soon after, where he will officially join the club from the 2016–17 season.

== International career ==
Mama represented Zimbabwe U20s team through the 2010 and 2011 IRB Junior World Championship. He was part of a RFU Championship XV team that defeated Canada 28-23 as part of their 2014 autumn tests, which was held at the Sixways Stadium in Worcester.
