= Nic Mayhew =

New Zealand rugby union player (born 1988)

- Full name: Nicholas Mayhew
- Born: 28 November 1989 (age 36) Auckland, New Zealand
- Height: 1.80 m (5 ft 11 in)
- Weight: 116 kg (18 st 4 lb; 256 lb)
- Notable relative(s): Mike Mayhew (brother); Richard Mayhew (brother)

Rugby union career
- Position: Loosehead Prop
- Current team: Rugby New York
Senior career
Years	Team	Apps	(Points)
2010-11	North Harbour	3	(0)
2011-14	Harlequins	20	(0)
2011-12	→Esher	6	(0)
2013-14	→London Scottish	15	(5)
2014−	North Harbour	26	(10)
2015−16	Blues	11	(0)
2017−2018	Brumbies	20	
2022–	Rugby New York		
- Correct as of 25 June 2022

Nicholas Mayhew (born 28 November 1988), is a professional rugby union player for the Brumbies in Super Rugby. He also plays for Rugby New York (Ironworkers) in Major League Rugby (MLR) where he won a championship in 2022. He plays in the front row at prop in both loosehead and tighthead positions.

Mayhew started out playing rugby at local club Northcote, part of the North Harbour Rugby Union. In 2010 Mayhew was selected for the North Harbour development team and played for the side in that year's ITM Cup. In 2011 he left New Zealand and, with a recommendation from former All Black and current North Harbour forwards coach Craig Dowd, joined Harlequins.

Mayhew broke his ankle in 2011/12 preseason training, but eventually debuted for Quins in the second round of the LV Cup against Sale. He had limited opportunity for first team rugby in his first year with Quins, but was dual-registered to Championship side Esher to gain experience.

As his father was born in England, Mayhew is qualified to play for both England and New Zealand. His brothers, Richard and Mike, both play for Newcastle Falcons and Mike started against Quins in their home fixture against Falcons when Nic made his Aviva Premiership debut from the bench.

After three seasons with the Harlequins, Mayhew returned to Auckland in 2014 and signed with Super Rugby team the Blues, and provincial team North Harbour in the ITM Cup. In 2016, North Harbour won the Mitre 10 Cup Championship final against Otago in Dunedin.

After two successful seasons playing for the Blues, Mayhew left the side at the end of 2016 and signed on to play for the Brumbies Super Rugby side based in Canberra, Australia for 2017 and re-signed with the team for the 2018 season. He was on the brink of an international call up for Australia, having impressed in Super Rugby with ACT Brumbies and his scrum ability put him on Test coach Michael Cheika's radar.

In 2018, Mayhew returned to New Zealand and played another season with North Harbour, before committing to England's Yorkshire Carnegie who captured Mayhew as marquee recruit on a two-year deal in a bid to secure a position in the Premiership. However the club entered Company Voluntary Arrangement 6 months later.

Mayhew returned to New Zealand to play for North Harbour. He then made a return to Super Rugby, playing for the Sunwolves in Japan in 2020.
