= Honiton Community College =

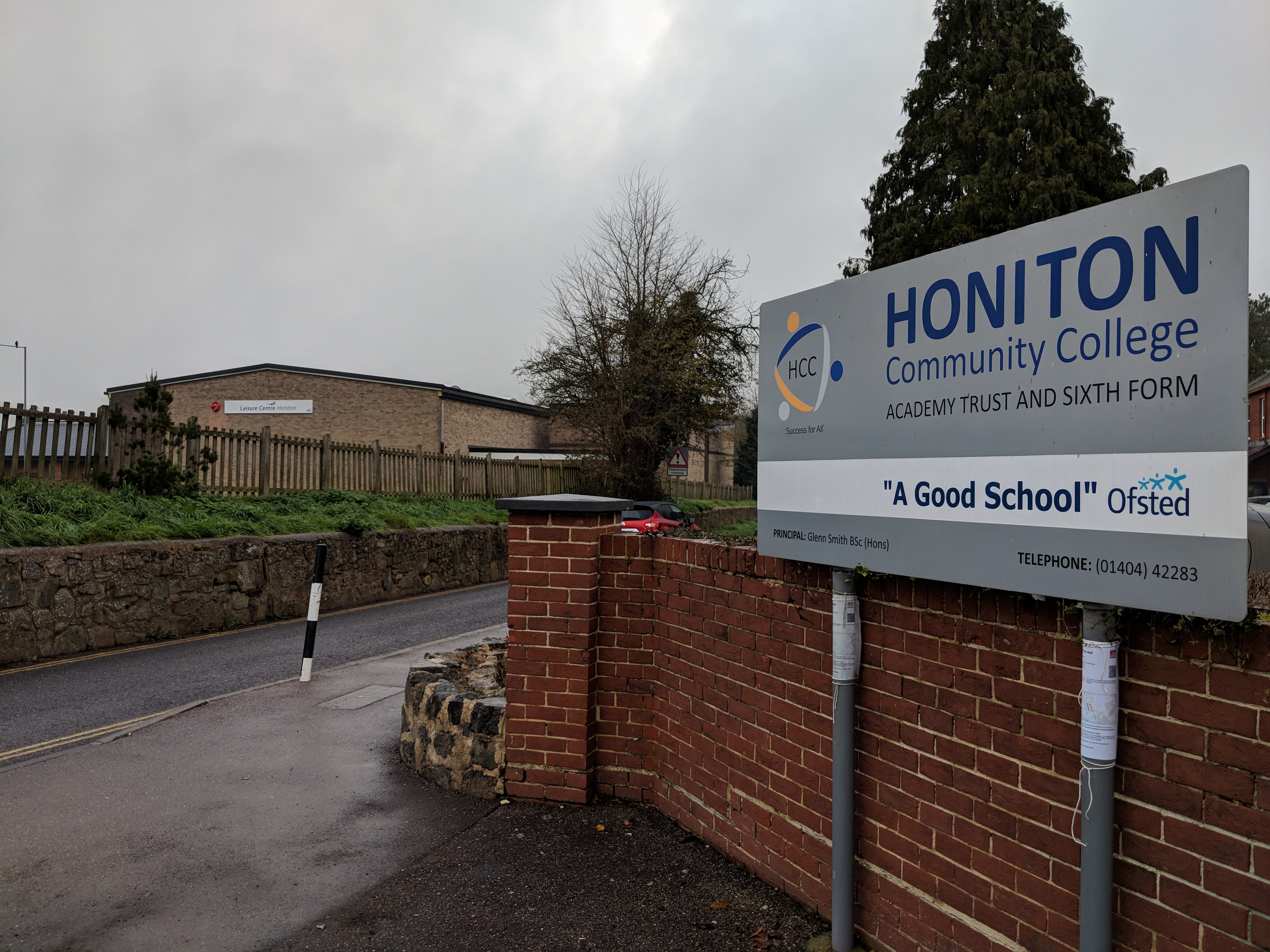

Location
- School Lane; Honiton, Devon, EX14 1QT; England; 50.8016°N 3.19081°W

Information
- Type: Academy
- Motto: Success for all; Kind. Curious. Resilient.
- Religious affiliation: none
- Established: 1938
- Department for Education URN: 136912 Tables
- Ofsted: Reports
- Staff: 124
- Gender: Coeducational
- Age: 11 to 16
- Enrolment: 650
- Houses: Hembury, Blackbury, Hartridge, Roundball
- Colours: Blue and yellow
- Website: honitoncommunitycollege.co.uk

Honiton Community College is a comprehensive secondary academy school in Honiton, Devon, England. It was originally established as Honiton Secondary School in 1938, and converted to an academy in 2011. The school educates around 650 students, and employs approximately 150 staff. The current principal is Mrs Brothwood, who follows Alex Kirkbride, who follows Glenn Smith, who in turn, took up the post in September 2009 following the retirement of predecessor Norman Tyson.

The school held 'specialist' status in science from 2005 until the specialist schools programme ended in 2010.

== Inspections ==
In 2022, the school was considered to have an overall effectiveness of 'requires improvement' by Ofsted. As of 2026, the school's most recent inspection was in 2024, with a judgement of Good.

== Music ==
The school has a music department. Music clubs include a Russian Balalaika ensemble, a Japanese Taiko group, a House Band and a Rock School. The school's Honiton Music Centre is open to anyone living in the area. The school has a recording studio.

== Campus and buildings ==
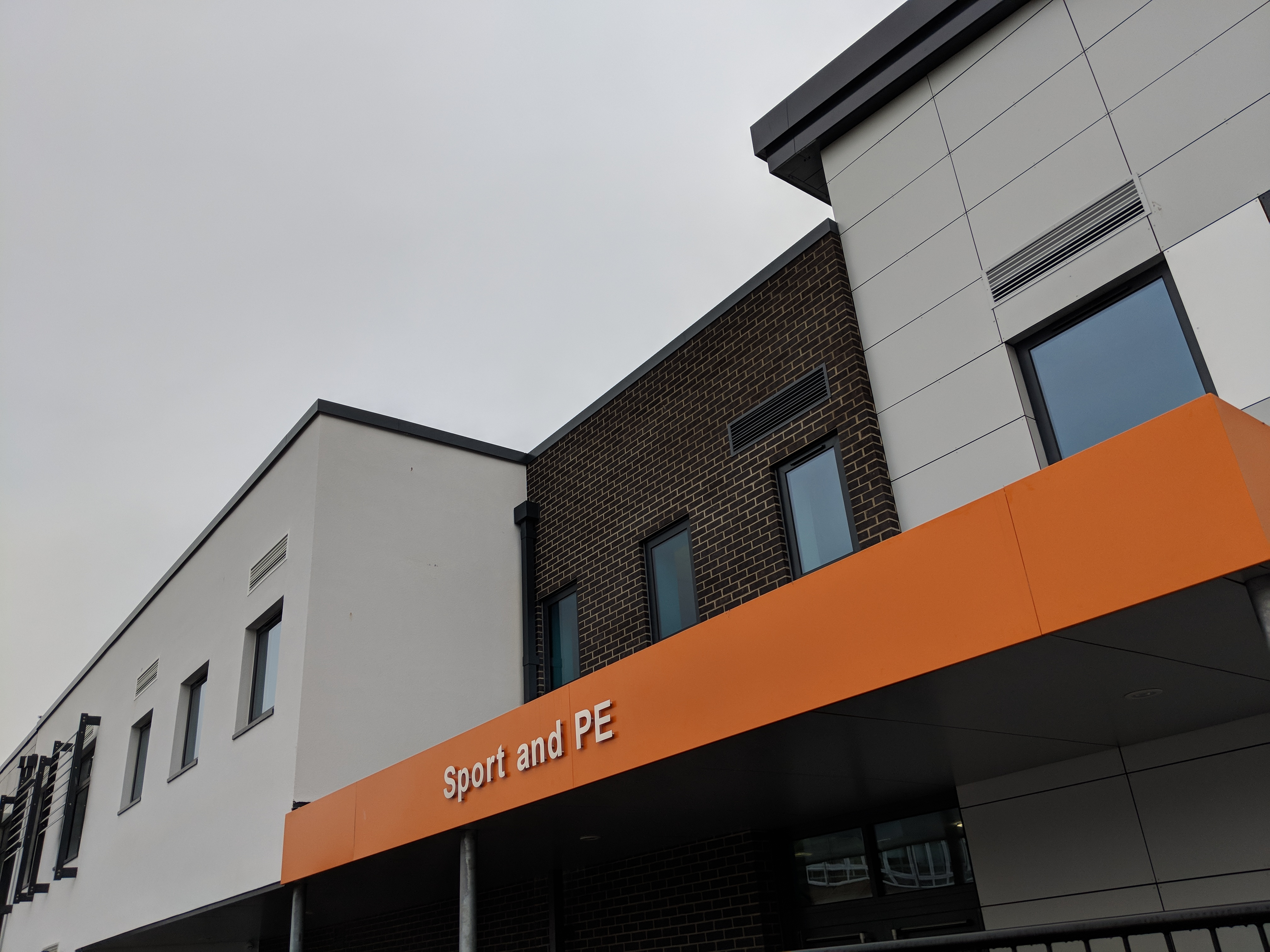
The Sport and PE building, opened in 2017.

Parts of the college's physical estate date back to its founding in the late 1930s, and the school has faced a legacy of poor construction for much of its history. In 1993, former principal Norman Tyson described it as 'hut city', and the college was then believed to have had the highest number of temporary classrooms in Devon.

Capital investment of ~£5 million between 2011 and 2018 improved the school's infrastructure and facilities, with the introduction of a number of purpose-built facilities, including an AV suite, dance studio, gym, sports hall, and sixth form common area as well as a refurbishment of English and the old Science block.

== Student activities ==
In September 2010, the school launched a student-led local radio station as 'Radio HCC' on 87.7FM (which has since stopped airing). Students at the school also have an inactive YouTube channel.

== Controversy ==
In 2022, Andy Holt, vice-principal at Honiton Community College, was found guilty of bringing the profession into disrepute after buying drugs, condoms and underwear for a 20-year-old in exchange for sex.

== Notable former students ==
- Douglas Fordyce — acrobatic gymnast
- Nathan Hannay - rugby union player
- Aaron Jarvis — international rugby union player
- David Lye — English cricketer
- Maurice Setters — English football player and manager
- Charlie Wright — rugby union player

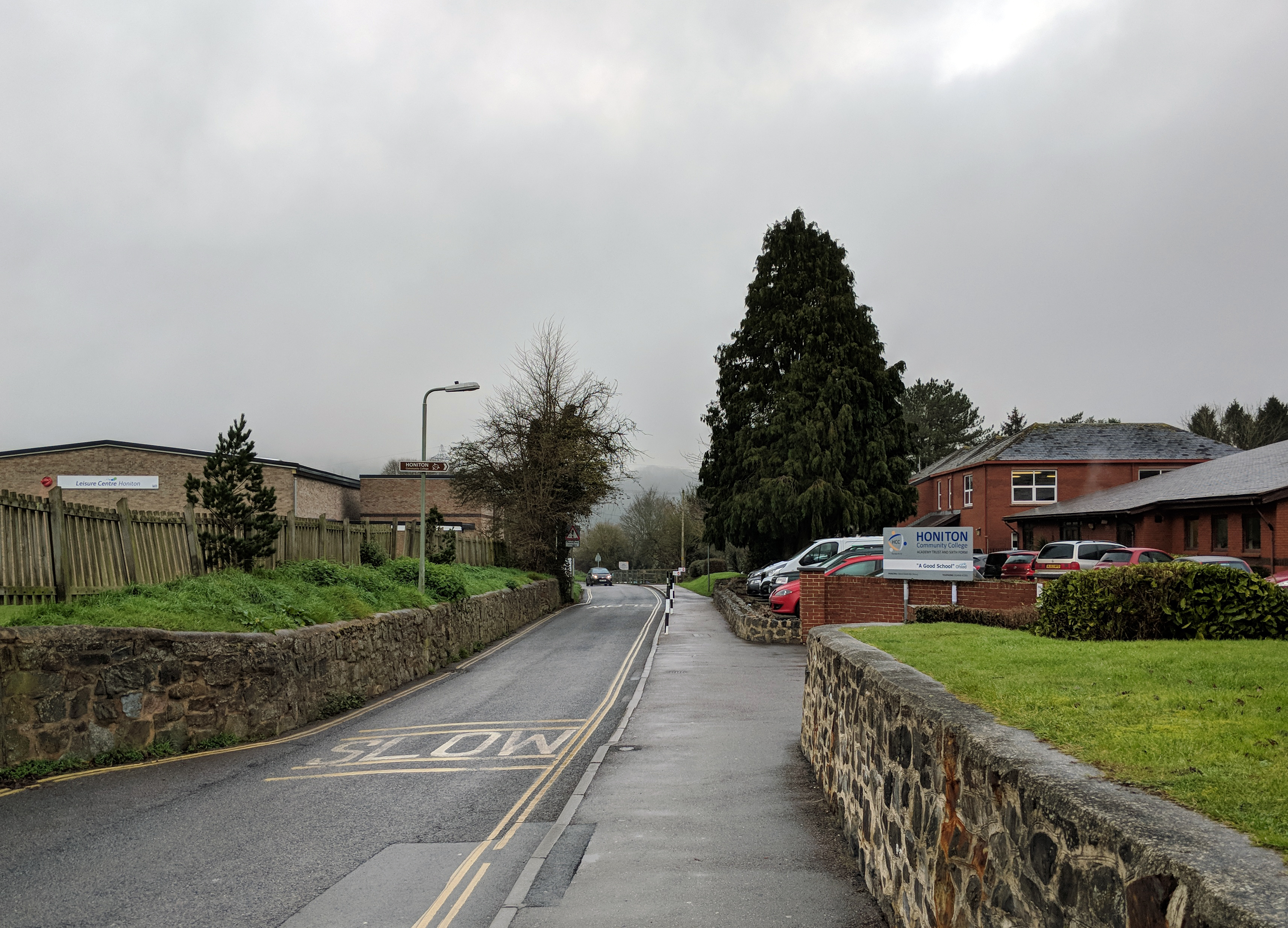
The entrance to the Honiton Community College campus on School Lane
