= Fraser Balmain =

English rugby union player (born 1991)

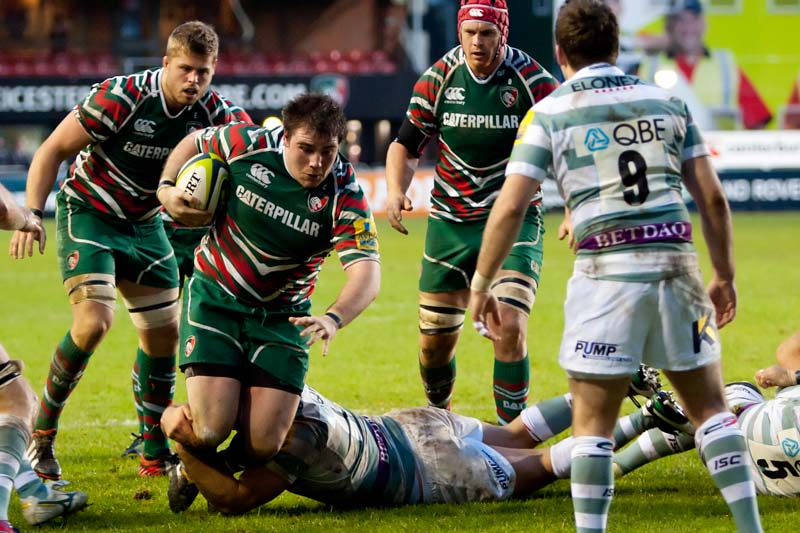
- Balmain playing for Leicester on November 18, 2012
- Born: Fraser John Balmain; 16 November 1991 (age 34) Newcastle upon Tyne, England
- Height: 1.85 m (6 ft 1 in)
- Weight: 117 kg (18 st 6 lb)
- School: Newlands School; Royal Grammar School, Newcastle upon Tyne
- University: Loughborough University

Rugby union career
- Position: Tighthead Prop
- Current team: Worcester Warriors
Senior career
Years	Team	Apps	(Points)
2011–2017	Leicester Tigers	92	(5)
2017–2024	Gloucester	139	(60)
2024–2025	Saracens	8	(0)
2025–	Worcester Warriors	8	(0)
- Correct as of 15 March 2026
International career
Years	Team	Apps	(Points)
2014	England XV	1	(0)
- Correct as of 1 June 2014

Fraser John Balmain (born 16 November 1991) is an English professional rugby union player who plays prop forward for Worcester Warriors in the Elior Champ Rugby. He previously played for Gloucester, Leicester Tigers and Saracens.

== Career ==
Balmain joined Leicester Tigers in July 2010 after being released from Newcastle Falcons academy and turning down an academy contract from Northampton Saints. On 12 November 2010 he made his Leicester debut from the bench during an Anglo-Welsh Cup game against Ospreys in Bridgend. He had to wait two years though to make his first start against the New Zealand Maori on 13 November 2012.

Balmain played as a replacement during the 2013 Premiership final as Leicester defeated Northampton Saints. The following year on 1 June 2014 saw him receive international recognition as he came off the bench as a substitute for an England XV in a non-cap friendly against the Barbarians. In his last season at the club Balmain started for the Tigers side that defeated Exeter Chiefs to win the 2016–17 Anglo-Welsh Cup.

On 10 January 2017, Balmain left Leicester to join Premiership rivals Gloucester ahead of the 2017–18 season. In his first campaign at the club he was part of the side that were defeated by Cardiff Blues in the 2017–18 European Rugby Challenge Cup final. The following campaign saw the cherry and whites reach the league play-offs and their elimination at the semi-final stage. In his last season with the club Balmain started in the 2023–24 EPCR Challenge Cup final at Tottenham Hotspur Stadium which saw them beaten by Sharks to finish runners up.

After over 100 appearances for Gloucester, in June 2024 Balmain joined Saracens. After a season at Saracens, Balmain would leave the club to join the revamped Worcester Warriors in the RFU Championship from the 2025-26 season.

== Honours ==
Leicester

- 1× Premiership Rugby: 2012–13
- 1× Anglo-Welsh Cup: 2016–17

Gloucester

- 2× EPCR Challenge Cup runner up: 2017–18, 2023–24
