= Darren Barry =

English rugby union player

- Born: Darren Barry; 2 February 1990 (age 36) Bristol, England
- Height: 1.98 m (6 ft 6 in)
- Weight: 114 kg (17 st 13 lb)
- School: Filton College

Rugby union career
- Position: Lock
Amateur team(s)
| Years | Team | Apps | (Points) |
- Old Redcliffians
| – | Clifton RFC | | |
| – | Blaydon RFC | | |
Senior career
| Years | Team | Apps | (Points) |
| 2010–2012 | Bristol | 60 | (0) |
| 2012–2015 | Cornish Pirates | 81 | (0) |
| 2015–2019 | Worcester Warriors | 37 | (5) |
| 2019–2021 | Newcastle Falcons | 20 | (0) |
| 2021 | Vannes | 0 | (0) |
- Correct as of 25 June 2017
International career
| Years | Team | Apps | (Points) |
| 2010 | England U19s | | |
| 2014 | RFU Championship XV | | |
- Correct as of 25 June 2017

Darren Barry (born 2 February 1990) is an English rugby union player who plays for Vannes in the Pro D2.

== Club career ==
Barry was part of Bristol academy system where he enjoyed a loan spell at Clifton near Bristol. Barry made his senior debut when they beat Cornish Pirates 60-15 at Camborne in May 2010 and made his 50th appearance for Bristol winning against the Pirates won 50-22 in the British and Irish Cup at the Mennaye Field in September 2011.

In July 2012, Barry left Bristol to join Cornish Pirates in the RFU Championship from the 2012-13 season. On 25 March 2015, Barry left Cornwall to join Western rivals Worcester Warriors in the Aviva Premiership ahead of the 2015-16 season. On 20 May 2016, Barry signed a contract extension to stay with the club at Sixways Stadium.

On 17 April 2019, Barry returns to the RFU Championship with Newcastle Falcons from the 2019-20 season.

On 5 April 2021, Barry would leave Newcastle to sign for Pro D2 side Vannes in France as medical joker for the rest of the 2020-21 season.

== International career ==
Barry was a regular member of the England U19s squad while still with Bristol. Barry was selected for a RFU Championship XV team that defeated Canada 28-23 as part of their 2014 autumn tests, which was held at the Sixways Stadium in Worcester.
