= Luke Carter =

New Zealand sailor

Personal information
- Nationality: New Zealand
- Born: 21 June 1960 (age 64); Wellington, New Zealand

Sport
- Sport: Sailing

Luke Carter (born 21 June 1960) is a New Zealand sailor. He competed in the Flying Dutchman event at the 1984 Summer Olympics.
