= Max Argyle =

- Born: Max Argyle; 13 November 1992 (age 34) Derby
- Height: 1.88 m (6 ft 2 in)
- Weight: 118 kg (18 st 8 lb)
- School: John Port School University of Sheffield

Rugby union career
- Position: Flanker
Amateur team(s)
Years	Team	Apps	(Points)
- Derby RFC
–	Sheffield Tigers		
Senior career
Years	Team	Apps	(Points)
2013 - 2015	Rotherham Titans		
2016-	Jersey Reds		
- Correct as of 9 November 2012

Max Argyle (born 13 November 1992) is an English rugby union player who plays for Jersey Reds in the Greene King IPA Championship. He plays primarily as a blindside flanker, but has positional flexibility within the back row.
