= Matt Vant Leven =

- Born: Matt Vant Leven; 23 October 1987 (age 39) Rotorua, New Zealand
- Height: 191 cm (6 ft 3 in)
- Weight: 106 kg (16 st 10 lb)
- School: Rotorua Boys' High School

Rugby union career
Senior career
Years	Team	Apps	(Points)
2014−2020	Kobelco Steelers	44	(35)
- Correct as of 15 January 2017
Provincial / State sides
Years	Team	Apps	(Points)
2010−13	Waikato	30	(5)
- Correct as of 21 October 2013
Super Rugby
Years	Team	Apps	(Points)
2011−13	Chiefs	12	(5)
- Correct as of 4 August 2013

Matt Vant Leven (born 23 October 1987) is a New Zealand rugby union footballer who plays as a loose forward for Waikato in the ITM Cup.

He made his Super Rugby debut for the Chiefs in 2011 and to date has played 3 games at that level. His impressive ITM Cup performances have seen him named in the team's Wider Training Squad for the 2013 Super Rugby season.

Matt Vant Leven will play for Kobelco Steelers in the 2014-'15 season of the Japanese top tier championship, Top League.
