= Mike Mayhew =

- Born: 22 January 1987 (age 39) Auckland, New Zealand
- Height: 1.87 m (6 ft 2 in)
- Weight: 110 kg (240 lb; 17 st 5 lb)
- Notable relative(s): Nic Mayhew (brother); Richard Mayhew (brother)

Rugby union career
- Position: Hooker
Senior career
Years	Team	Apps	(Points)
2009–11	North Harbour	16	(0)
2011	Wasps	2	(0)
2011–13	Newcastle	25	(25)
2013–15	London Irish	26	(0)
2015−16	Waikato	3	(5)
2016-	Yorkshire Carnegie	43	(20)
- Correct as of 9 October 2015

Michael Mayhew (born 22 January 1987 in Auckland, New Zealand) is a rugby union player for London Irish in the Aviva Premiership. He plays as a hooker.

Mayhew moved to England to join Newcastle Falcons in 2011, alongside his brother Richard.
