= Richard Mayhew (rugby union) =

- Born: 24 June 1985 (age 41) Auckland, New Zealand
- Height: 1.91 m (6 ft 3 in)
- Weight: 110 kg (240 lb; 17 st 5 lb)
- Notable relative(s): Nic Mayhew (brother); Mike Mayhew (brother)

Rugby union career
- Position: Flanker/Number 8
- Current team: Yorkshire Carnegie
Senior career
Years	Team	Apps	(Points)
2007–2010	North Harbour	40	(3)
2010–2011	Esher	8	(2)
2011–16	Newcastle	89	(8)
2016–	Yorkshire Carnegie	36	(3)

Richard Mayhew (born 24 June 1985 in Auckland, New Zealand) is a rugby union player for Yorkshire Carnegie in the RFU Championship. He plays as a flanker or a number 8.

Mayhew started out playing rugby at local club Northcote, part of the North Harbour Rugby Union. He first moved to England to join London Wasps in 2010, but the deal fell through. Mayhew then played for National League 1 side, Esher before moving to Newcastle (alongside his brother Michael, who now plays for London Irish), making his debut against Bath on the first day of the 2011–12 season.
