= Luke Baldwin (rugby union) =

English rugby union footballer (born 1990)

- Born: Luke Baldwin; 15 September 1990 (age 36) Royal Tunbridge Wells, Kent, England
- Height: 5 ft 8 in (1.73 m)
- Weight: 179 lb (81 kg)
- School: The Judd School

Rugby union career
- Position: Scrum-half
- Current team: Worcester Warriors
Youth career
- -: Tunbridge Wells
- –: Saracens
Senior career
Years	Team	Apps	(Points)
	Tunbridge Wells	0	(0)
2006–2013	Saracens	4	(0)
2009–2010	Blackheath	0	(0)
2010–2013	Bedford Blues	52	(35)
2013–2015	Bristol	19	(15)
2015–2021	Worcester Warriors	35	(20)
2019–2021	→ Dragons	10	(5)

Luke Baldwin (born 15 September 1990) is a retired rugby union player born in Royal Tunbridge Wells, England. He most recently played for Dragons in the Pro14 on loan from Aviva Premiership side, Worcester Warriors as a scrum-half.

== Early life ==
Baldwin was educated at The Judd School in Tonbridge, where he also played rugby for them. In 2003, he represented Judd at Kent County Athletics U13 Championships at Canterbury High School, finishing third in the 75-metre hurdles and fourth in the 100-metres.

== Club career ==
Baldwin started playing rugby for Tunbridge Wells RFC. In 2006, he signed with Saracens Academy where he trained while also playing for Tunbridge Wells until 2009. After leaving Tunbridge Wells, he was loaned to Blackheath F.C. He made his debut for Saracens in 2010 and went on to make 5 first team appearances for Saracens.

In 2010, he was loaned to RFU Championship side, Bedford Blues as part of a player linkup. In 2012, he returned to Bedford Blues on a dual registration with Saracens. While at Bedford, he received praise for his performances. He also represented Saracens in the Premiership Rugby Sevens Series while also playing for Bedford Blues in the RFU Championship. In 2013, he left Saracens and Bedford Blues and signed for Bristol Rugby, playing his final game for Bedford against London Welsh. On 17 February 2015, Baldwin left Bristol to join local rivals Worcester Warriors who make their move to the Aviva Premiership from the 2015–16 season.

On 4 July 2019, Baldwin will join Welsh region Dragons in the Pro14 on a season-long loan for the 2019–20 season. On 22 May 2020, Baldwin extends his loan with Dragons for another season for the 2020–21 season. Baldwin left Worcester in Summer 2021 and announced his retirement from rugby.

== Representative Honours ==
In 2007, he was selected to play for the Kent RFU and was later called up for London & South East Under-18s. In 2008, he was selected to play for England under-16s. In 2010, Baldwin was selected to play for England Counties XV against AIB Ireland Club XV and the France amateur national rugby union team. In 2012, he played for RFU Championship XV against the Māori All Blacks after being selected by Bedford Blues coach, Mike Rayner.
