= Nathan Hannay =

English rugby union player

- Born: Nathan Hannay; 5 October 1984 (age 42) Halifax, England
- Height: 6 ft 7 in (2.01 m)
- Weight: 126 kg (278 lb)
- School: Honiton Community College
- Occupation: Rugby union player

Rugby union career
- Position: Lock
- Current team: Honiton
Senior career
Years	Team	Apps	(Points)
- Honiton
2008–2010	Sidmouth		
2010	Launceston		
2010–2013	Jersey		
2013–15	Yorkshire Carnegie		
International career
Years	Team	Apps	(Points)
	RFU Championship XV	1	(0)

Nathan Hannay (born 5 October 1984) is an English rugby union player from Halifax, West Yorkshire who currently plays for the Devon side, Honiton RFC.

== Early life ==
Hannay had his bachelor degree from Honiton Community College.

== Career ==
Hannay first started playing rugby for Honiton Rugby Club before moving to Sidmouth Rugby Club in 2008. He made his debut for Sidmouth against Plymouth Albion. In 2010 during Sidmouth's South West One season, he moved to National League 1 side Launceston RUFC. Later in the year after advice from Dyson Wilson, Hannay moved to Jersey.

In 2011, Hannay was suspended for two weeks after being sent off during Jersey's game against Cambridge R.U.F.C. for head-butting an opposition player. He was suspended by Jersey for two weeks before the Rugby Football Union also suspended him for two weeks. In 2012 after rejecting advances to sign him from Aviva Premiership side Exeter Chiefs, Hannay was appointed as captain of Jersey taking over from Graham Bell. On 16 April 2013, Hannay signs for Championship rivals Yorkshire Carnegie from 2013-14 season. Hannay left Yorkshire Carnegie at the end of the 2014-15 season, and retired from professional rugby; he has since become Player-Coach at his former club Honiton.

=== Representative rugby ===
Hannay has not yet represented England at any level. In 2009 he represented Devon in the County Championship. When Hannay moved to Launceston, who were above level five of the English rugby union system, Hannay became ineligible to represent Devon. In 2012, Hannay was selected to represent the RFU Championship XV for their match against New Zealand's Māori All Blacks team at Castle Park rugby stadium, Doncaster. Hannay was the only player from Jersey selected for the match.
