= Jackson Willison =

NZ rugby union player

- Born: Jackson Dan Kingi Willison; 5 September 1988 (age 38) Hamilton, New Zealand
- Height: 1.82 m (6 ft 0 in)
- Weight: 93 kg (14 st 9 lb)
- School: Otorohanga College; Hamilton Boys' High School
- Notable relative(s): Tenika Willison (cousin); Xavier Willison (cousin); Te Maire Martin (cousin); Taine Tuaupiki (cousin)

Rugby union career
- Position: Inside Centre
- Current team: Soyaux Angoulême XV Charente
Senior career
Years	Team	Apps	(Points)
2014–2016	Grenoble	33	(10)
2016–2018	Worcester Warriors	45	(25)
2018–2020	Bath	24	(5)
2020	Soyaux Angoulême	4	(0)
Provincial / State sides
Years	Team	Apps	(Points)
2007–14	Waikato	60	(65)
Super Rugby
Years	Team	Apps	(Points)
2009–12	Chiefs	39	(30)
2013–14	Blues	21	(15)
International career
Years	Team	Apps	(Points)
2008	New Zealand under-20	5	(10)
2010–	Māori All Blacks	7	(5)

Jackson Dan Kingi Willison (born 5 September 1988) is a New Zealand rugby union player. His regular playing position is as a centre.

Willison played for the Chiefs in Super Rugby from 2009 to 2012, and was part of the title winning Chiefs in 2012. He has also played for the Blues in Super Rugby and Waikato in the Mitre 10 Cup.

In 2012, he was selected for the Māori All Blacks end of year tour.

For 2013, Willison was initially included in the Chiefs, before being delisted by coach Dave Rennie while he sought to contract Counties-Manukau midfielder Bundee Aki. Blues coach John Kirwan acted quickly to sign Willison and move him to Auckland.

At the start of 2014, it was announced that he would leave the Blues after the 2014 Super Rugby season to join French Top 14 side Grenoble on a two-year contract. On 8 January 2016, Willison joined Aviva Premiership team Worcester Warriors for the 2015–16 season. On 15 January 2018, Willison signs for local rivals Bath ahead of the 2018–19 season.

At conclusion of his contract with Bath he moved to French Pro D2 club Soyaux Angoulême.
