= Bronson Murray =

NZ rugby union player (born 1982)

- Born: 6 November 1982 (age 44) Kaitaia, New Zealand
- Height: 1.84 m (6 ft 0 in)
- Weight: 118 kg (18 st 8 lb)
- Occupation: Business owner

Rugby union career
- Position: Prop
Provincial / State sides
Years	Team	Apps	(Points)
2002–10, 13	Northland	104	(0)
2011–12	Bay of Plenty	5	(0)
Super Rugby
Years	Team	Apps	(Points)
2008	Blues	1	(0)
2009	Crusaders	11	(0)
2010–13	Highlanders	32	(5)
International career
Years	Team	Apps	(Points)
2008–13	Māori All Blacks	7	(0)

Bronson Murray (born 6 November 1982) is a New Zealand rugby union player. A prop, Murray last played provincial rugby for Bay of Plenty and notably Northland in the National Provincial Championship.

== Playing career ==
=== Provincial Rugby ===
A former New Zealand Under 21 international, Murray broke into the Northland provincial side in 2002 and has remained a fixture there for nearly a decade. Originally a loosehead prop, he converted to tighthead in 2007 and can play on either side of the scrum.

Murray signed with Canterbury as part of his Super 14 move to the Crusaders in 2009, but the transaction was essentially on paper only as he was immediately loaned back to Northland.

At the conclusion of the 2010 ITM Cup, Murray sat only 4 caps away from 100 for Northland, but the province's financial problems saw him leave to sign with Bay of Plenty for the 2011 ITM Cup.

He was not included in the ITM Cup for 2015.

=== Super Rugby ===
Murray was included in the Blues squad for the 2008 Super 14 season, but found opportunities difficult to come by behind All Black props Tony Woodcock and John Afoa, appearing in only 1 contest for a total of 4 minutes.

For the 2009 Super 14 season, Murray signed with the Crusaders. After starting the season as a bench player, he received a run of 5 starts in the squad after Ben Franks was ruled out through injury.

Murray was on the move again in 2010 after being claimed in the draft by the Highlanders. He saw little game action in the first half of the season, but injuries to starting props Jamie Mackintosh and Clint Newland saw him see a more prominent role as the season went along, and he started the final 2 games of the year. He scored his first Super Rugby try in the dying seconds of a 33–31 loss to the Hurricanes on 24 April.

=== International Rugby ===
Murray was selected to represent the New Zealand Māori team in the 2008 Pacific Nations Cup and again for the 2010 Centenary Series, where he featured in historic wins over Ireland and England.

== Personal ==
An avid outdoorsman, Murray grew up on a large Northland farm and enjoys hunting, fishing, and diving in his spare time.
