= Ben May (rugby union) =

New Zealand rugby union footballer (born 1982)

- Full name: Benjamin May
- Born: 13 October 1982 (age 44) Blenheim, New Zealand
- Height: 193 cm (6 ft 4 in)
- Weight: 124 kg (273 lb; 19 st 7 lb)
- School: Nelson College

Rugby union career
- Position: Prop
Senior career
Years	Team	Apps	(Points)
2004–2005	Nelson Bays	20	(0)
2006–2008	Tasman	25	(10)
2007	Crusaders	2	(0)
2008–2011	Chiefs	33	(0)
2009–2012	Waikato	35	(5)
2012–2022	Hurricanes	101	(20)
2014	Munakata Sanix Blues	3	(0)
2015	Wellington	7	(0)
2016–2019	Hawke's Bay	27	(5)
2020	Taranaki	5	(0)
- Correct as of 5 June 2022
International career
Years	Team	Apps	(Points)
2007–2018	Māori All Blacks	15	(15)
- Correct as of 5 June 2022

Benjamin May (born 13 October 1982) is a former New Zealand rugby union player. His position of choice is prop.

== Early life ==
May was born in Blenheim, New Zealand. He attended Nelson College from 1996 to 1999.

== Professional career ==
May made his Super 14 debut for the Crusaders against the Lions in 2007. After three Crusaders appearances, he signed with the Chiefs for the 2008 season, making his Chiefs debut against the Blues. In 2012, he signed with the Hurricanes, with whom he made his 50th Super Rugby appearance in 2012. In 2013, May signed with Fukuoka Sanix Blues of the Top League for two years, beginning with the 2013–14 season.

May also has played in the ITM Cup for Nelson Bays, Tasman and Waikato, making his debut with the former in 2004. Currently, May plays for Hawke's Bay in the Mitre 10 Cup.

Of Ngāti Maniapoto descent, May played for the Māori All Blacks in 2007, 2008 and 2012.
