= Kade Poki =

NZ rugby union player

- Born: Kade Poki; 17 January 1988 (age 38) Blenheim, New Zealand
- Height: 1.76 m (5 ft 9 in)
- Weight: 85 kg (13 st 5 lb)
- School: Hato Paora College

Rugby union career
- Position: Wing
Senior career
Years	Team	Apps	(Points)
2013–2015	Kubota Spears	18	(25)
2015−2018	Bayonne	20	(30)
- Correct as of 14 June 2017
Provincial / State sides
Years	Team	Apps	(Points)
2006–10	Tasman	40	(35)
2011–12	Southland	13	(0)
2015	Tasman	6	(0)
Super Rugby
Years	Team	Apps	(Points)
2008–10	Crusaders	15	(10)
2011–13	Highlanders	27	(50)

Kade Poki (born 17 January 1988 in Blenheim, New Zealand) is a rugby union player who plays for the Bayonne in the French Top 14 competition. Prior to his move abroad, he had represented Tasman in the ITM Cup and the Highlanders in the Super Rugby competition.

== Playing career ==
=== Provincial Rugby ===
Poki made his Air New Zealand Cup debut for the Tasman Makos in 2007 against Taranaki, but injury ruled him out of most of the season. He emerged as a starter in 2008, and spent three seasons as a starter on the wing for the Makos and one of the side's more dangerous players.

For the 2011 ITM Cup, Poki signed with the Southland Stags, where he lined up alongside a number of his teammates with the Highlanders. However, he never really hit his stride with in two seasons with Southland, playing just 13 games without scoring a try.

Poki briefly returned to Tasman for the 2015 ITM Cup in between stints in Japan and France, appearing in 6 matches for the Makos.

=== Super Rugby ===
Poki made his Super Rugby debut for the Crusaders in 2008 when he played against ACT Brumbies. Aged only 20, he made 10 starts for the team over the course of the season and scored two tries, helping the team to the championship. However, injuries and squad depth limited his chances to build on his freshman season, and he made only 4 more appearances for the Crusaders over the next two seasons.

Poki had to make a tough decision to stay with the crusaders on a one-year deal, or to join the highlanders under new coach Jamie Joseph on a 2-year deal. He chose the crusaders for one year. He received an offer from a Japanese club (Sanix) to come after the super rugby season. When Poki asked for an early release from NZRU to head to Japan straight after the Super rugby season the crusaders withdrew their deal and Poki was left with no super rugby team until his contract started in 2014. The highlanders had a bad injury to Kurt Baker so Jamie Joseph got in contact with Poki to see if he wanted to join the team for preseason and cover Kurts position if the injury was prolonged. He ended up having a good season with the Highlanders and emerged as one of the breakout players of the competition. The highlanders offered him a 2-year contract to sign on again. Poki had to terminate his contract with the Japanese club he had signed with. Highlights of his season include a two-try performance in a win over the defending champion Bulls and a sublime individual effort against the Rebels in which he shrugged off 11 tackles to score. With higher expectations for the 2012 season, Poki was hobbled by a knee injury and missed much of the season, and was limited to a single try. However, he would rebound in the 2013 season scoring 5 tries from just 8 appearances. He played two-year more seasons with the highlanders then headed to Japan to play for the Kubota spears in the Japanese top league.

=== Japan ===
Following the 2013 Super Rugby season, Poki left New Zealand to sign in Japan for the Kubota Spears of the Top League.

=== France ===
In 2015, Poki signed in France with Bayonne of Pro D2 in France. In his first season, he scored 4 tries from 12 matches to help earn promotion to the Top 14. He scored an additional two tries in 2016–17 as Bayonne were relegated back to Pro D2.

=== International Rugby ===
Kade Poki was a star in the 2007 Under-19 World Cup for New Zealand, and again for the New Zealand Under-20 squad in 2008.
