= Nic Rouse =

English rugby union player

- Born: Nicholas Rouse; 10 February 1981 (age 45) Chatham, Kent
- Height: 1.98 m (6 ft 6 in)
- Weight: 115 kg (18 st 2 lb)
- Occupation: Rugby union player

Rugby union career
- Position: Lock
Senior career
Years	Team	Apps	(Points)
- Plymouth Albion
2006–2010	Nottingham Rugby		
2008	London Irish (loan)		
2010–2011	Sale Sharks		
2011-2013	Nottingham Rugby		
2013-2016	London Irish		

Nic Rouse (born 10 February 1981 in Chatham, Kent, England) is a former rugby union player for London Irish in the RFU Premiership. He previously played for Sale Sharks in the Aviva Premiership. He plays as a lock. Rouse joined Sale Sharks in 2010 from Nottingham. He had previously made over 120 appearances for Nottingham and enjoyed a short spell on loan to London Irish in 2008 when injuries to Nick Kennedy, James Hudson and Bob Casey meant the club had only 1 fit lock. Rouse was educated in Newbury and from the age of 5 played rugby at Newbury Rugby Club. He joined the Bath Rugby Academy in 1999 and subsequently spent time with Caerphilly, Manchester and several seasons with Plymouth Albion before joining Nottingham in 2006 when he was awarded 'Player of the Year' in his first season. He was named in the National One 'Dream Team' in Rugby Times twice and has represented England Students and England Counties. Rouse retired in April 2016 after ongoing injury problems.
