= Romana Graham =

NZ rugby union player

- Born: Romana Graham; 29 May 1986 (age 40) Hastings, New Zealand
- Height: 2.00 m (6 ft 6 1/2 in)
- Weight: 115 kg (18 st 2 lb)
- School: Church College of New Zealand

Rugby union career
- Position: Lock
- Current team: Stade Rochelais
Senior career
Years	Team	Apps	(Points)
2013–2014	Exeter Chiefs	5	(0)
2014	Plymouth (loan)	2	(0)
2014-17	La Rochelle	44	(0)
- Correct as of 11 December 2019
Provincial / State sides
Years	Team	Apps	(Points)
2008–13	Waikato	36	(15)
- Correct as of 11 December 2019
Super Rugby
Years	Team	Apps	(Points)
2010–13	Chiefs	19	(5)
International career
Years	Team	Apps	(Points)
2010	New Zealand Maori		

Romana Graham (born 29 May 1986) is a New Zealand rugby union footballer. His regular playing position is lock. Having previously played for the Chiefs in Super Rugby and Waikato in the ITM Cup it was announced Graham would be joining Aviva Premiership side Exeter Chiefs After playing for Exeter Graham then signed for La Rochelle on a two-year contract.
