= Jon Vickers (rugby union) =

English rugby union player

- Born: 23 December 1988 (age 37) Bristol, England
- Height: 1.75 m (5 ft 9 in)
- Weight: 102 kg (16 st 1 lb)

Rugby union career
- Position(s): Hooker, Prop
Senior career
Years	Team	Apps	(Points)
2007-2010	Northampton Saints		
2010-2012	Exeter Chiefs		
2012-2013	Plymouth Albion		
2013-	Nottingham		

Jon Vickers (born 23 December 1988 in Bristol, England) is a rugby union player. He moved to Exeter Chiefs from fellow Premiership side Northampton Saints. He plays as a hooker but can also play both sides at prop.

Vickers moved from Exeter Chiefs to Plymouth Albion for the 2012-13 season. It was announced at the end of the 2012-13 season that Vickers would leave Plymouth for Championship rivals Nottingham.
