= Jacob Ellison =

NZ rugby union player

- Born: 25 February 1985 (age 41) Wellington, New Zealand
- Height: 1.895 m (6 ft 3 in)
- Weight: 113 kg (17 st 11 lb)
- School: Mana College, Porirua
- University: Victoria University of Wellington
- Notable relative: Vincent Bevan (grandfather) Tamati Ellison (brother)

Rugby union career
- Position: Prop forward
Senior career
Years	Team	Apps	(Points)
2014–	Fukuoka Sanix Blues	2	(0)
- Correct as of 19 January 2015
Provincial / State sides
Years	Team	Apps	(Points)
2007–11	Wellington	45	(10)
Super Rugby
Years	Team	Apps	(Points)
2008–11	Hurricanes	31	(0)
2012	Highlanders	1	(0)
International career
Years	Team	Apps	(Points)
2008	Māori		
- Correct as of 9 June 2008

Jacob Ellison (born 25 February 1985 in Wellington, New Zealand) is a New Zealand rugby union footballer who plays for Fukuoka Sanix Blues in the Japanese Top League. He plays the position of prop. He has previously played for Wellington in the ITM Cup and the Hurricanes and Highlanders in Super Rugby.

Ellison made his Wellington debut in 2007 and his Hurricanes debut a year later. After four years with the Hurricanes, he played for the Highlanders in 2012. He was delisted at the end of the season after making only one competition appearance.

Ellison is a graduate of Victoria University of Wellington. He is a member of Ngāti Porou. He is the younger brother of All Black Tamati Ellison and the grandson of the All Black Vincent Bevan.
