= Nick Crosswell =

NZ rugby union player (born 1986)

- Born: Nick Crosswell; 3 April 1986 (age 40) Feilding, New Zealand
- Height: 1.96 m (6 ft 5 in)
- Weight: 110 kg (17 st 5 lb)

Rugby union career
- Position: Flanker
Senior career
Years	Team	Apps	(Points)
2015–17	Newport Gwent Dragons	56	(5)
Provincial / State sides
Years	Team	Apps	(Points)
2006–15, 17-19;	Manawatu	104	(15)
- Correct as of 14 October 2018
Super Rugby
Years	Team	Apps	(Points)
2010	Hurricanes	9	(0)
2011–12	Highlanders	22	(0)
2013–14	Chiefs	10	(0)
- Correct as of 1 June 2014
International career
Years	Team	Apps	(Points)
2014–	Māori All Blacks	1	(0)
- Correct as of 21 January 2015

Nick Crosswell (born 3 April 1986) is a New Zealand rugby union player who currently plays for Manawatu in the Mitre 10 Cup.

== Playing career ==
=== Provincial Rugby ===
Crosswell made his debut for Manawatu in the 2006 Air New Zealand Cup and his strong work rate and solid tackling quickly established him as a starter for the side.

Crosswell was named team captain for the 2011 ITM Cup, but suffered through a difficult season as injury limited him to just four starts. In his absence, Manawatu finished second from the bottom of the table in the competition. Both Crosswell and the team had a vastly improved 2011, however, as he started every game as captain in helping the team to the Championship Final of the ITM Cup.

=== Super Rugby ===
Crosswell was named in the Hurricanes squad for the 2010 Super 14 season, after impressing in provincial rugby for Manawatu. He managed to establish himself as a reliable loose forward for the club, appearing in 9 of their 13 matches including two starts.

For the 2011 Super Rugby season, Crosswell transferred south to join the Highlanders. In his first season for the Highlanders, Crosswell was used primarily coming off the bench, but he became a more regular starter in 2012.

For the 2013 Super Rugby season, Crosswell transferred north to the Chiefs.

=== Move to Wales ===
In January 2015, Crosswell joined the Welsh regional team Newport Gwent Dragons He was released at the end of the 2016–17 season.
