= Hika Elliot =

- Born: Hikawera Te Po Elliot; 22 January 1986 (age 40) Hastings, New Zealand
- Height: 1.86 m (6 ft 1 in)
- Weight: 110 kg (17 st 5 lb)
- School: Hastings Boys' High School

Rugby union career
- Position: Hooker
Senior career
Years	Team	Apps	(Points)
2017-18	Oyonnax Rugby	20	(10)
2018-2020	USO Nevers	31	(35)
2020-2023	Colomiers	51	(50)
Provincial / State sides
Years	Team	Apps	(Points)
2005–12	Hawke’s Bay	73	(45)
2013	Counties Manukau	8	(10)
2014	Poverty Bay	1	(0)
2015	Taranaki	8	(5)
2016−17	Counties Manukau	6	(0)
2024	South Canterbury	6	(10)
2024	Wellington	1	(0)
Super Rugby
Years	Team	Apps	(Points)
2008	Hurricanes	13	(5)
2009–2017	Chiefs	115	(35)
International career
Years	Team	Apps	(Points)
2008–2017	Māori All Blacks	10	(5)
2010–2015	New Zealand	4	(0)

Hikawera Te Po "Hika" Elliot (born 22 January 1986) is a New Zealand rugby union player.

== Rugby career ==
Elliot has represented and progressed through all levels of rugby in New Zealand. In 2004 he was part of the Under 19 team that won the World Championship in South Africa while he was still in school. He was also part of the New Zealand Under 21 and School Boys rugby team, captaining the latter.

He played for the Hurricanes for the 2008 and 2009 seasons before moving to the Chiefs in 2010, with whom he won his first Super Rugby title in 2012, and second title in 2013. Elliot also plays for Taranaki Rugby Union in the ITM Cup.

He was called as a replacement for Andrew Hore in the All Blacks tour of UK and Ireland. Hore had sprained his ankle during their 2008 Bledisloe Cup match in Hong Kong. He played in their game against Munster. He was last named in the All Blacks 2010 end-of-year tour to Hong Kong, UK and Ireland.

== Outside rugby ==
Elliot also has some sporting experience outside of rugby. He has represented New Zealand in age group basketball and has a black belt in Kung Fu. He comes from an extensive martial arts family background. In 2008 he qualified for the Karate World Championships held in Japan.
