= Ben Afeaki =

New Zealand rugby union player

- Full name: Ben Tu'umoe Paul Afeaki
- Born: 12 January 1988 (age 38) Auckland, New Zealand
- Height: 193 cm (6 ft 4 in)
- Weight: 124 kg (273 lb; 19 st 7 lb)
- School: Sacred Heart College
- Notable relative: Adam Coleman (cousin)

Rugby union career
- Position: Prop
Senior career
| Years | Team | Apps | (Points) |
| 2007–2013 | North Harbour | 58 | (20) |
| 2010–2014 | Chiefs | 36 | (5) |
- Correct as of 29 May 2020
International career
| Years | Team | Apps | (Points) |
| 2008 | New Zealand U20 | 4 | (0) |
| 2010–2013 | Māori All Blacks | 8 | (0) |
| 2013 | New Zealand | 1 | (0) |
- Correct as of 29 May 2020
Coaching career
- Years: Team
- 2016–2017: North Harbour (assistant)
- 2018–: Blues (assistant)
- 2019–: Samoa (assistant)
- Correct as of 29 May 2020

Ben Tu'umoe Paul Afeaki (born 12 January 1988) is a former New Zealand rugby union footballer. His regular playing position was prop. He represented the Chiefs in Super Rugby and North Harbour in the ITM Cup between 2010 and 2014 and also made one appearance for New Zealand in 2013.

Afeaki made his lone test appearance on 8 June 2013, replacing Wyatt Crockett with five minutes left during a 23–13 victory over France.

He retired in April 2015, aged 27, after failing to recover from a concussion sustained during the 2014 Super Rugby season.

It was announced in 2017 that Afeaki would become the Blues' Scrum Coach for the 2018 season. Afeaki claimed he was still suffering concussion symptoms at the time.
