= List of 2015–16 RFU Championship transfers =

This is a list of player transfers involving RFU Championship teams before or during the 2015–16 season. The list is of deals that are confirmed and are either from or to a rugby union team in the Championship during the 2014–15 season. It is not unknown for confirmed deals to be cancelled at a later date.

== Bedford Blues ==
=== Players In ===
- (Wales) Steffan Jones from (Wales) Newport Gwent Dragons
- Sam Blanchet from England Sevens
- (Australia) Myles Dorrian from (England) London Irish
- (England) Jack Culverhouse from (England) Hertford RFC
- (Ireland) Mark Flanagan from (France) Mont-de-Marsan
- (Scotland) Sam James from (England) Wasps
- (England) Jordan Burns from (England) Harlequins

=== Players Out ===
- (South Africa) Darryl Veenendaal to (England) Nottingham
- (England) Antonio Harris to (England) Nottingham
- (Tonga) Viliami Hakalo to (England) Nottingham
- (England) Jim Wigglesworth to (England) Doncaster Knights

== Bristol ==
=== Players In ===
- (England) Tom Varndell from (England) Wasps
- (Wales) Marc Jones from (England) Sale Sharks
- (Wales) Gavin Henson from (England) Bath Rugby
- (England) Jamal Ford-Robinson from (England) Cornish Pirates
- (England) Will Cliff from (England) Sale Sharks
- (England) James Phillips from (England) London Scottish
- (South Africa) Rayn Smid from (South Africa) Western Province

=== Players Out ===
- (Scotland) Ross Rennie retired
- (England) Andy Short to (England) Worcester Warriors
- (Wales) Nicky Robinson to (France) Oyonnax
- (England) Luke Baldwin to (England) Worcester Warriors
- (England) Mark Cooke to (England) Jersey
- (Wales) Rhys Lawrence to (England) Ealing Trailfinders
- (England) Ben Skirving retired
- (Wales) Ryan Jones retired
- (Zimbabwe) Marco Mama to (England) Worcester Warriors (season-loan)

== Cornish Pirates ==
=== Players In ===
- (England) Alex Day from (England) Northampton Saints
- (Canada) Brett Beukeboom from (England) Plymouth Albion
- (England) Toby May from (England) Westcombe Park
- (England) Will Cargill from (England) Yorkshire Carnegie

=== Players Out ===
- (England) Tom Kessell to (England) Northampton Saints
- (England) Jamal Ford-Robinson to (England) Bristol Rugby
- (England) Darren Barry to (England) Worcester Warriors

== Doncaster Knights ==
=== Players In ===
- (England) Ollie Stedman from (England) London Welsh
- (England) Will Hurrell from (England) Coventry RFC
- (England) Simon Humberstone from (Wales) Cardiff Blues
- (England) Jake Armstrong from (England) Wharfedale
- (Ireland) Michael Heaney from (Ireland) Ulster
- (Ireland) Declan Cusack from (England) Plymouth Albion
- Sam Edgerley from England Sevens
- (England) Joe Sproston from (England) Ampthill
- (England) Jim Wigglesworth from (England) Bedford Blues
- (England) Ted Stagg from (England) Plymouth Albion

=== Players Out ===
- (England) Tom Davies retired
- (England) Jamie Lennard retired
- (Argentina) Bruno Bravo to (England) Darlington Mowden Park
- (England) Phil Eggleshaw to (England) Hull Ionians
- (England) Paul Roberts to (England) Esher RFC
- (Scotland) Colin Phillips to (Scotland) Stewart's Melville RFC
- (England) Will Foden to (England) Hull Ionians
- (Tonga) Tomasi Palu to (New Zealand) Wellington Lions
- (Wales) Ross Davies released
- (Tonga) Latiume Fosita released

== Ealing Trailfinders ==
=== Players In ===
- (United States) Tom Bliss from (England) Wasps (season-loan)
- (England) Nathan Hannay from (England) Yorkshire Carnegie
- (England) Iain Grieve from (England) Plymouth Albion
- (England) Joe Munro from (England) Nottingham
- (England) Michael Holford from (England) Nottingham
- (England) George Porter from (England) Worcester Warriors
- (England) Toby Howley-Berridge from (England) Plymouth Albion
- (Wales) Rhys Lawrence from (England) Bristol Rugby
- (England) Sam Rodman unattached
- (England) Tristan Roberts from (England) London Welsh
- (England) Alex Davies from (England) London Welsh
- (England) Rhys Crane from (England) London Welsh
- (England) Chris York from (England) Newcastle Falcons
- (Ireland) Danny Barnes from (England) Newcastle Falcons
- (Australia) Harrison Orr from (Australia) West Harbour
- Callum Wilson from England Sevens
- (England) Adam Precanin from (England) London Scottish
- Sam Stanley from England Sevens
- (England) James Stephenson from (England) Worcester Warriors

=== Players Out ===
- (Romania) Andrei Radoi to (Romania) Timișoara Saracens
- (England) Anders Nilsson to (England) Blackheath
- (England) Michael Walker-Fitton to (Spain) CR El Salvador
- (England) Steve Pape retired
- (England) Tom Parker to (England) East Grinstead RFC
- (England) James Copsey to (England) East Grinstead RFC
- (Wales) Matt Jarvis to (Wales) Merthyr RFC
- (Lithuania) Ignas Darkintis to (England) Darlington Mowden Park
- (England) Kevin Davis to (England) Esher RFC
- (England) Gary Johnson released
- (Wales) Tom Brown released
- (United States) Ronnie McLean released

== Jersey ==
=== Players In ===
- (England) Jack Moates from (England) Wasps
- (England) Oli Evans from (England) Wasps
- (Ireland) Charlie Butterworth from (Ireland) Ulster
- (Ireland) Ross Adair from (Ireland) Ulster
- (England) Ben Featherstone from (England) Esher
- (England) James Freeman from (England) Loughborough Students RUFC
- (South Africa) Brendon Cope from (South Africa) Durban Collegians
- (England) Mark Cooke from (England) Bristol Rugby
- (Ireland) Seán McCarthy from (Ireland) Leinster
- (England) Richard Lane from (England) Bath Rugby
- (Italy) Cosma Garfagnoli from (Italy) Rovigo
- (Scotland) Tommy Spinks from (Scotland) Glasgow Warriors
- (Scotland) Russell Anderson from (England) Darlington Mowden Park
- (England) Rhys Owens from (England) Loughborough Students RUFC

=== Players Out ===
- (England) Drew Locke to (England) London Scottish
- (England) Harry Williams to (England) Exeter Chiefs
- (Australia) Ryan Hodson to (England) London Welsh
- (England) Ryan Glynn to (England) London Welsh
- (New Zealand) Jonny Bentley to (New Zealand) Wellington Lions
- (Wales) David Bishop to (Wales) Merthyr RFC
- (Tonga) Paula Kaho to (Wales) Merthyr RFC
- (England) Ben Maidment released
- (England) Gareth Harris released
- (England) Grant Pointer released
- (England) Mark Foster released
- (Ireland) Michael Noone released
- (England) Myles Landwick released
- (Australia) Tobias Hoskins released

== London Scottish ==
=== Players In ===
- (England) Drew Locke from (England) Jersey
- (Scotland) Neale Patrick from (England) Plymouth Albion
- Russell Weir from Scotland Sevens
- (Scotland) Dave Young from (Wales) Newport Gwent Dragons
- Jason Harries from Wales Sevens
- (Wales) Rory Bartle from (England) Gloucester Rugby
- (England) Jimmy Litchfield from (England) London Welsh
- (England) Will Carrick-Smith from (England) Exeter Chiefs
- (Ireland) Tyrone Moran from (Ireland) Munster
- (South Africa) Kurt Schonert from (South Africa) Durban Collegians

=== Players Out ===
- (Scotland) Jim Thompson retired
- (South Africa) Errie Claassens retired
- (Scotland) Jamie Stevenson to (England) Wasps
- (England) Adam Precanin to (England) Ealing Trailfinders
- (England) James Phillips to (England) Bristol Rugby
- (Scotland) Ben Prescott retired

== London Welsh ==
=== Players In ===
- (England) Guy Armitage from (England) London Irish
- (England) Josh Drauniniu from (England) Worcester Warriors
- (Wales) Martyn Thomas from (England) Wasps
- (Wales) Kieran Murphy from (France) CA Brive
- (Australia) Ryan Hodson from (England) Jersey
- (England) Gus Jones from (England) Wasps
- (England) Will Skuse from (England) Bath Rugby
- (England) Joe Carlisle from (Italy) Benetton Treviso
- (Wales) Josh Davies from (England) Plymouth Albion
- (Scotland) Darryl Marfo from (England) Harlequins
- (England) Harry Allen from (England) London Irish
- (England) Ryan Glynn from (England) Jersey
- (Samoa) Daniel Leo from (England) London Irish
- (South Africa) Brendon Snyman from (France) US Montauban
- (United States) Thretton Palamo from (England) Saracens (season-loan)

=== Players Out ===
- (England) Tom May retired
- (Tonga) Opeti Fonua to (England) Leicester Tigers
- (England) Carl Kirwan to (England) Worcester Warriors
- (New Zealand) Piri Weepu to (France) Oyonnax
- (Tonga) Taione Vea to (England) Newcastle Falcons
- (Ireland) Paul Rowley to (Ireland) Ulster
- (England) Peter Browne to (Ireland) Ulster
- (England) Dean Schofield to (England) Yorkshire Carnegie
- (England) Seb Stegmann to (England) Yorkshire Carnegie
- (Wales) Elliot Kear to (England) London Broncos
- (Scotland) Gordon Ross retired
- (England) Ollie Stedman to (England) Doncaster Knights
- (Australia) Lachlan McCaffrey to (England) Leicester Tigers
- (England) Tristan Roberts to (England) Ealing Trailfinders
- (England) Alex Davies to (England) Ealing Trailfinders
- (England) Rhys Crane to (England) Ealing Trailfinders
- (England) Ed Hoadley to (New Zealand) Dunedin RFC
- (England) James Tincknell to (England) Coventry RFC
- (New Zealand) Tim Molenaar to (England) Moseley
- (England) Jimmy Litchfield to (England) London Scottish
- (Tonga) Chris Hala'ufia to (France) RC Narbonne
- (New Zealand) Daniel Browne to (England) Rosslyn Park
- (New Zealand) Nathan Taylor to (England) Burton RFC
- (Wales) James Down to (Wales) Cardiff Blues

== Moseley ==
=== Players In ===
- (England) Glyn Hughes from (England) Wasps
- (England) Buster Lawrence from (England) Wasps
- (Ireland) Joe Bercis from (England) Ampthill
- (England) Tom Fidler from (England) Plymouth Albion
- (Wales) Aaron Pinches from (Wales) Bedwas RFC
- (Wales) Kyle Evans from (Wales) Scarlets
- (Canada) Aaron Flagg from (Canada) Abbotsford
- (England) Harry Casson from (England) Yorkshire Carnegie
- (New Zealand) Tim Molenaar from (England) London Welsh
- (Wales) Rhys Williams from (England) Leicester Tigers
- (England) Charlie Foley from (England) Plymouth Albion

=== Players Out ===
- (Wales) Will Owen to (England) Rotherham Titans
- (England) Ollie Thomas retired
- (England) Neil Mason retired
- (England) Joe Carpenter to (England) Coventry RFC
- (England) Nile Dacres to (England) Plymouth Albion
- (Wales) Anthony Carter retired

== Nottingham ==
=== Players In ===
- (England) Kieran Davies from (England) Exeter Chiefs
- (England) Ben Morris from (England) Newcastle Falcons
- (England) Rob Langley from (England) Plymouth Albion
- (Ireland) Ben Woods from (England) Plymouth Albion
- (England) Lawrence Rayner from (England) Plymouth Albion
- (England) Tom Heard from (England) Plymouth Albion
- (South Africa) Darryl Veenendaal from (England) Bedford Blues
- (England) Antonio Harris from (England) Bedford Blues
- (Tonga) Viliami Hakalo from (England) Bedford Blues
- (England) Josh Skelcey from (England) Northampton Saints
- (Ireland) Sam Coghlan Murray from (Ireland) Leinster
- (Scotland) Murray McConnell from (Scotland) Glasgow Warriors
- (Ireland) Ricky Andrew from (Ireland) Ulster

=== Players Out ===
- (England) Finlay Barnham retired
- (Fiji) Campese Ma'afu to (France) Provence
- (South Africa) Shaun Malton to (England) Exeter Chiefs
- (England) Liam O'Neill to (England) Henley Hawks
- (New Zealand) Sean Romans retired
- (New Zealand) Brent Wilson retired
- (England) Joe Munro to (England) Ealing Trailfinders
- (England) Michael Holford to (England) Ealing Trailfinders
- (England) Tom Calladine to (England) Rotherham Titans
- (England) Ryan Hough to (England) Coventry RFC
- (England) Kiefer Laxton to (England) Ampthill
- (England) Will Maisey to (England) Ampthill
- (England) Cameron Lee-Everton released
- (England) Rory Lynn released
- (England) Edward Styles released
- (Scotland) Corey Venus released

== Rotherham Titans ==
=== Players In ===
- (Wales) Will Owen from (England) Moseley
- (England) Luke Carter from (England) Rosslyn Park
- (England) Jack Hayes from (England) Chinnor
- (England) Josh Redfern from (England) Sheffield Tigers
- (Wales) Darran Harris from (Wales) Scarlets
- (England) James Elliott from (England) Old Centralians
- (England) Will Goodwin from (England) Chester
- (England) Charlie Maddison from (England) Darlington Mowden Park
- (Ireland) Michael Cromie from (France) Stade Rodez
- (England) Toby Salmon from (England) Chinnor
- (England) Tom Calladine from (England) Nottingham
- (England) George Oram from (England) Blackheath
- (England) Andy Davies from (England) Newcastle Falcons
- (England) Joe Barker from (England) Hull Ionians
- (Australia) Tim Cree from (Australia) Canberra Vikings
- (Canada) Kyle Gilmour from (Canada) Prairie Wolf Pack
- (Wales) Ross Jones from (Wales) Ospreys

=== Players Out ===
- (England) Tom Cruse to (England) London Irish
- (England) Alex Rieder to (England) Wasps
- (England) Ben Thomas to (England) Coventry RFC

== Yorkshire Carnegie ==
=== Players In ===
- (England) Kevin Sinfield from (England) Leeds Rhinos
- (England) Dean Schofield from (England) London Welsh
- (England) Seb Stegmann from (England) London Welsh
- (England) Andy Saull from (England) Newcastle Falcons
- (England) Joel Hodgson from (England) Northampton Saints
- (Scotland) Tom Ryder from (England) Northampton Saints
- (England) Tom Casson from (England) Harlequins
- (England) Andy Forsyth from (England) Sale Sharks
- (England) Rob O'Donnell from (England) Worcester Warriors

=== Players Out ===
- (England) Ben Harris to (England) Newcastle Falcons
- (England) Paul Hill to (England) Northampton Saints
- (England) Rob Vickerman retired
- (England) Nathan Hannay to (England) Ealing Trailfinders
- (England) Will Cargill to (England) Cornish Pirates
- (England) Harry Casson to (England) Moseley
- Sam Egerton to England Sevens
- (England) Ollie Hayes retired

== See also ==
- List of 2015–16 Premiership Rugby transfers
- List of 2015–16 Pro12 transfers
- List of 2015–16 Top 14 transfers
- List of 2015–16 Super Rugby transfers
- List of 2015 SuperLiga transfers
