= List of 2017–18 RFU Championship transfers =

This is a list of player transfers involving RFU Championship teams before or during the 2017–18 season. The list is of deals that are confirmed and are either from or to a rugby union team in the Championship during the 2016–17 season. On 7 December 2016, London Welsh announced that it is going into voluntary liquidation due to an "unsustainable" financial situation. On 13 May 2017, Hartpury are promoted to the Championship from the 2017–18 season. On 24 May 2017, London Irish are promoted into the Premiership, whilst Bristol are demoted back to the Championship for the 2017–18 season. It is not unknown for confirmed deals to be cancelled at a later date.

== Bedford Blues ==
=== Players In ===
- (Wales) Jarad Williams from (England) Doncaster Knights
- (Ireland) Seán McCarthy from (England) Jersey Reds
- (England) Alex Penny from (England) Ealing Trailfinders
- (England) George Edgson from (England) Wasps
- (England) Lee Dickson from (England) Northampton Saints
- (Wales) Chris Czekaj from (France) Colomiers
- (England) Will Hooley from (England) Exeter Chiefs
- (England) Howard Packman from (England) Northampton Saints
- (England) Tom Lindsay from (England) Gloucester
- (England) Richard Lane from (England) Jersey Reds
- (England) Harry Sheppard from (England) London Scottish

=== Players Out ===
- (England) Christian Judge to (England) Cornish Pirates
- (England) Jake Sharp to (England) London Scottish
- (England) Tom James to (England) Doncaster Knights
- (England) James Hallam to (England) Ealing Trailfinders
- (Wales) Dan George to (England) London Scottish
- (England) Mike Howard to (England) London Scottish
- (Scotland) Jason Hill to (England) Doncaster Knights
- (Australia) Byron Hodge to (England) Rotherham Titans

== Bristol ==
=== Players In ===
- (Samoa) Alapati Leiua from (England) Wasps
- (New Zealand) Steven Luatua from (New Zealand) Blues
- (Ireland) Ian Madigan from (France) Bordeaux
- (Tonga) Sione Faletau from (England) Yorkshire Carnegie
- (Scotland) Jack Cosgrove from (Scotland) Edinburgh
- (Australia) Luke Morahan from (Australia) Western Force
- (England) Ehize Ehizode from (England) Wasps
- (England) George Perkins from (England) Saracens
- (England) Joe Batley from (England) Gloucester
- (New Zealand) Joe Latta from (England) Gloucester
- (Ireland) Jason Harris-Wright from (England) London Irish
- (England) Tyler Gendall from (England) Harlequins
- (Australia) Nick Haining from (England) Jersey Reds
- (Scotland) Reiss Cullen from (Scotland) Watsonian
- (England) Sam Bedlow from (England) Sale Sharks
- (England) Mat Protheroe from (England) Gloucester
- (Wales) Dan Thomas from (England) Gloucester
- (Samoa) Chris Vui from (England) Worcester Warriors
- (England) Ryan Glynn from (England) Preston Grasshoppers

=== Players Out ===
- (England) Charlie Amesbury retired
- (Scotland) Mitch Eadie to (England) Northampton Saints
- (England) Jamal Ford-Robinson to (England) Northampton Saints
- (New Zealand) Mark Sorenson retired
- (England) Adrian Jarvis retired
- (Wales) Gavin Henson to (Wales) Dragons
- (England) Will Cliff to (England) Sale Sharks
- (Wales) Marc Jones to (England) Sale Sharks
- (England) Rob Hawkins retired
- (Wales) Ian Evans retired
- (England) Jon Fisher sabbatical
- (England) Alec Carey to (England) Jersey Reds
- (England) James Hall sabbatical
- (England) Elias Caven to (England) Hartpury College
- (Australia) BJ Edwards to (England) Hartpury College
- (New Zealand) Jason Woodward to (England) Gloucester
- (England) Nick Carpenter to (England) Hartpury College
- (England) Ben Mosses to (England) London Scottish
- (England) James Phillips to (England) Bath
- (England) Ben Glynn to (England) Harlequins
- (England) Shane Geraghty to (France) Stade Français
- (Samoa) Anthony Perenise to (England) Bath
- (Scotland) Kyle Traynor to (England) Leicester Tigers
- (South Africa) Nick Köster to (England) Cambridge University
- (New Zealand) Alby Mathewson to (France) Toulon
- (England) Luke Arscott released
- (England) Chris Brooker released
- (Wales) Martin Roberts released

== Cornish Pirates ==
=== Players In ===
- (England) Christian Judge from (England) Bedford Blues
- (England) Tom Cowan-Dickie from (England) Plymouth Albion
- (England) Toby Freeman from (England) Nottingham
- (England) Rupert Cooper from (England) Plymouth Albion
- (New Zealand) Dan Koster from (New Zealand) Canterbury
- (Argentina) Nicholas Coronel from (Italy) Lazio
- (Australia) Angus Taylor from (England) Redruth
- (Fiji) Sam Matavesi from (England) Redruth

=== Players Out ===
- (Germany) Rob Elloway retired
- (England) Jack Arnott to (England) Plymouth Albion
- (England) Luke Chapman to (England) Plymouth Albion
- (England) Alex Dancer to (England) Chinnor
- (England) Jake Parker to (England) Richmond
- (England) Edd Pascoe to (England) Redruth

== Doncaster Knights ==
=== Players In ===
- (England) Morgan Eames from (England) Nottingham
- (England) Tom Hicks from (England) Rotherham Titans
- (Wales) Will Owen from (England) Rotherham Titans
- (Tonga) Jack Ram from (New Zealand) Northland
- (England) Ian Williams from (England) Rotherham Titans
- (England) Tom James from (England) Bedford Blues
- (England) David Nelson from (England) Newcastle Falcons
- (Scotland) Jason Hill from (England) Bedford Blues
- (England) Charlie Foley from (England) Rotherham Titans
- (Scotland) Junior Bulumakau from (Scotland) Glasgow Warriors
- (Wales) Owen Evans from (England) Harlequins

=== Players Out ===
- (Tonga) Latu Makaafi to (England) Coventry
- (Wales) Jarad Williams to (England) Bedford Blues
- (Ireland) Seán Scanlon to (England) Nottingham
- (England) Ed Falkingham to (England) Hull Ionians
- (Wales) WillGriff John to (England) Sale Sharks
- (England) Sam Edgerly to (England) Oxford University
- (England) Harry Allen retired
- (Scotland) Robin Hislop to (Scotland) Ayr
- (Ireland) David Nolan to (Ireland) Malahide
- (Australia) Beau Robinson released

== Ealing Trailfinders ==
=== Players In ===
- (England) Rory Clegg from (Scotland) Glasgow Warriors
- (Ireland) Peter Lydon from (England) London Scottish
- (Scotland) Grayson Hart from (Scotland) Glasgow Warriors
- (England) Mark Tampin from (England) Jersey Reds
- (Wales) Lewis Robling from (England) Jersey Reds
- (England) Ollie Curry from (England) Rotherham Titans
- (England) James Hallam from (England) Bedford Blues
- (England) Piers O'Conor from (England) Wasps
- (New Zealand) Daniel Temm from (England) Newcastle Falcons
- (England) Seb Stegmann from (England) Yorkshire Carnegie
- (Canada) Djustice Sears-Duru from (Canada) Ontario Blues
- (Canada) Shane O'Leary from (Ireland) Connacht

=== Players Out ===
- (Wales) Josh Davies to (England) Chinnor
- (England) Alex Penny to (England) Bedford Blues
- (England) Seb Nagle-Taylor to (England) Jersey Reds
- (England) Tyler Bush to (England) London Irish Wild Geese
- (England) Alex Bradley to (England) Chinnor
- (Wales) Carwyn Jones to (France) Vannes
- (England) Luke Peters to (England) Rotherham Titans
- (Wales) Alex Walker to (England) London Scottish
- (England) Phil Chesters to (England) Chinnor
- (England) Curtis Wilson to (England) Sheffield Eagles
- (England) Iain Grieve to (England) Hartpury College
- (England) Rhys Crane to (England) Rosslyn Park
- (England) Adam Preocanin retired
- (United States) Andrew Durutalo to (England) Worcester Warriors
- (England) Karl Gibson released
- (Argentina) Ignacio Saenz Lancuba released
- (England) Chris York released

== Hartpury ==
=== Players In ===
- (England) Elias Caven from (England) Bristol
- (Australia) BJ Edwards from (England) Bristol
- (England) Nick Carpenter from (England) Bristol
- (England) Dan Murphy from (England) Harlequins
- (England) Mike Daniels from (England) Worcester Warriors
- (England) Tom Heard from (England) Nottingham
- (England) Will Crane from (England) Birmingham Moseley
- (England) James Williams from (England) Birmingham Moseley
- (England) Ed Sheldon from (England) Birmingham Moseley
- (England) Rob Langley from (England) Nottingham
- (England) Darryl Dyer from (England) Coventry
- (England) Alex Ducker from (England) Redruth
- (England) Iain Grieve from (England) Ealing Trailfinders
- (England) Aquille Smith from (England) Hull Ionians
- (England) Rupert Harden from (England) Richmond

=== Players Out ===
- (Italy) Sebastian Negri to (Italy) Benetton
- (Italy) Jake Polledri to (England) Gloucester
- (England) Jamie Cooke to (England) Rotherham Titans
- (England) Nathan Taylor to (England) Cinderford
- (Australia) Ellie Abrahams to (England) Jersey Reds

== Jersey Reds ==
=== Players In ===
- (Ireland) Conor Joyce from (Ireland) Ulster
- (England) Seb Nagle-Taylor from (England) Ealing Trailfinders
- (South Africa) Jared Saunders from (England) Saracens
- (Fiji) Lee Roy Atalifo from (New Zealand) Canterbury
- (England) Alec Carey from (England) Bristol
- (England) Jordan Brodley from (England) Bristol University
- (South Africa) Roy Godfrey from (England) Wimbledon
- (Tonga) Apakuki Ma'afu from (Australia) NSW Country Eagles
- (England) Matt Rogerson from (England) Sale Sharks
- (Ireland) Mark Best from (Ireland) Ulster
- (Wales) Rory Bartle from (England) London Scottish
- (England) Oliver Bryant from (England) Leicester Tigers
- (Wales) Josh Hodson from (Wales) Llandovery
- (Australia) Tom Pincus from (Australia) Queensland Country
- (South Africa) Jason Worrall from (South Africa) Western Province
- (Ireland) Jerry Sexton from (England) London Irish
- (Wales) Rory Pitman from (Wales) Ebbw Vale
- (Australia) Tim Duchense from (England) Darlington Mowden Park
- (South Africa) Scott van Breda from (South Africa) Western Province
- (Australia) Ellie Abrahams from (England) Hartpury College
- (New Zealand) Tom Quarrie from (France) Stade Niçois
- (Australia) Jake Upfield from (Australia) Bond University
- (England) Auguy Slowik from (England) Worcester Warriors

=== Players Out ===
- (England) Heath Stevens to (England) Coventry
- (South Africa) Simon Kerrod to (England) Worcester Warriors
- (England) Pierce Phillips to (England) Worcester Warriors
- (Ireland) Seán McCarthy to (England) Bedford Blues
- (England) James Freeman to (England) Exeter Chiefs
- (Scotland) Gary Graham to (England) Newcastle Falcons
- (Australia) Nick Haining to (England) Bristol
- (England) Mark Tampin to (England) Ealing Trailfinders
- (Wales) Lewis Robling to (England) Ealing Trailfinders
- (England) Richard Lane to (England) Bedford Blues
- (England) Sam Katz to (France) Massy
- (Ireland) James McKinney to (Italy) Fiamme Oro
- (England) Joe Buckle to (England) Yorkshire Carnegie
- (England) George Watkins to (England) Yorkshire Carnegie
- (South Africa) Ayron Schramm to (Germany) Heidelberger RK
- (England) Nick Scott to (England) London Scottish
- Jack Cuthbert to Scotland Sevens
- (Tonga) Samisoni Fisilau released
- (Scotland) Nick Campbell released
- (England) Jordan Davies released

== London Scottish ==
=== Players In ===
- (England) Jake Sharp from (England) Bedford Blues
- (Canada) Kyle Baillie from (Canada) Atlantic Rock
- (Italy) Derrick Appiah from (England) Worcester Warriors
- (Wales) Dan George from (England) Bedford Blues
- (England) Mike Howard from (England) Bedford Blues
- (Scotland) Isaac Miller from (England) Loughborough Students RUFC
- (England) Ben Christie from (England) Loughborough Students RUFC
- (England) Ed Milne from (England) Rosslyn Park
- (New Zealand) Chris Walker from (England) Blackheath
- (England) Gregor Gillanders from (England) Blackheath
- (England) Max Berry from (England) Loughborough Students RUFC
- (England) Peter Austin from (England) British Army
- (England) Ross Neal from (England) London Irish
- (Wales) Rob Stevenson from (England) Durham University
- (Scotland) James Tyas from (England) Rotherham Titans
- (England) Ben Mosses from (England) Bristol
- (Wales) Alex Walker from (England) Ealing Trailfinders
- (Namibia) Tijuee Uanivi from (Scotland) Glasgow Warriors
- (England) Nick Scott from (England) Jersey Reds
- (Wales) Jonathan Mills from (England) Sale Sharks
- (Scotland) Fraser Lyle from (Scotland) Glasgow Warriors
- (United States) Dino Waldren from (Ireland) Blackrock College
- (England) Charlie Ingall from (England) Sale Sharks

=== Players Out ===
- (Ireland) Peter Lydon to (England) Ealing Trailfinders
- (Wales) Rory Bartle to (England) Jersey Reds
- (England) Harry Sheppard to (England) Bedford Blues
- (Wales) Jason Harries to (Scotland) Edinburgh
- (Fiji) Ifereimi Boladau to (England) Rotherham Titans

== Nottingham ==
=== Players In ===
- (New Zealand) James Penman from (England) Darlington Mowden Park
- (England) Tiff Eden from (England) Worcester Warriors
- (Ireland) Seán Scanlon from (England) Doncaster Knights
- (Ireland) Danny Qualter from (Ireland) Connacht
- (Ireland) Rory Burke from (Ireland) Munster
- (Samoa) Aniseko Sio from (England) Leicester Lions

=== Players Out ===
- (England) Antonio Harris to (England) Wasps
- (England) Harry Morley to (England) Coventry
- (England) Morgan Eames to (England) Doncaster Knights
- (England) Toby Freeman to (England) Cornish Pirates
- (England) Joe Green to (England) Chinnor
- (England) Tom Heard to (England) Hartpury College
- (England) Rob Langley to (England) Hartpury College
- (England) Lawrence Rayner to (England) Ampthill
- (England) Connor Bullivant released
- (England) James Stephenson released

== Richmond ==
=== Players In ===
- (England) Jake Parker from (England) Cornish Pirates

=== Players Out ===
- (England) Sam Stuart to (England) Newcastle Falcons
- (England) Adam Peters to (England) Rotherham Titans
- (England) Rupert Harden to (England) Hartpury College

== Rotherham Titans ==
=== Players In ===
- (England) Matt Shields from (England) Harlequins
- (Wales) Rhodri Davies from (Wales) Llandovery
- (England) Andrew Foster from (England) Newcastle Falcons
- (England) James Lasis from (England) Loughborough Students RUFC
- (South Africa) Rob Louw from (Scotland) Gala
- (Ireland) Jonny Murphy from (Ireland) Ulster
- (New Zealand) Tom Burns from (England) Chinnor
- (England) Drew Cheshire from (England) Birmingham Moseley
- (England) Luke Peters from (England) Ealing Trailfinders
- (England) Adam Peters from (England) Richmond
- (Australia) Byron Hodge from (England) Bedford Blues
- (South Africa) Brandon Palmer from (South Africa) Golden Lions
- (South Africa) Wesley Hamilton from (Scotland) Hawick
- (Fiji) Ifereimi Boladau from (England) London Scottish
- (Cyprus) Yiannis Loizias from (England) Loughborough Students RUFC
- (England) Guy Borrowdale from (England) Yorkshire Carnegie
- (England) Jamie Cooke from (England) Hartpury College
- (Portugal) Francisco Vieira from (Portugal) CDUP Rugby

=== Players Out ===
- (England) Toby Salmon to (England) Exeter Chiefs
- (Spain) Joe Hutchinson to (England) Chinnor
- (England) Tom Hicks to (England) Doncaster Knights
- (Wales) Will Owen to (England) Doncaster Knights
- (England) Ollie Curry to (England) Ealing Trailfinders
- (England) Ian Williams to (England) Doncaster Knights
- (England) Jack Hayes to (England) Cinderford
- (England) Danny Herriott to (England) Blackheath
- (England) Ricky Cano to (England) Plymouth Albion
- (England) Buster Lawrence to (England) Birmingham Moseley
- (England) Charlie Foley to (England) Doncaster Knights
- (England) Matt Dudman to (England) Darlington Mowden Park
- (England) Darren Oliver to (England) Chinnor
- (England) Jack Ramshaw to (England) Chinnor
- (Scotland) James Tyas to (England) London Scottish
- (Wales) Joe Rees to (Wales) Merthyr

== Yorkshire Carnegie ==
=== Players In ===
- (Scotland) Callum Irvine from (England) Hull Ionians
- (England) Joe Buckle from (England) Jersey Reds
- (England) George Watkins from (England) Jersey Reds
- (Wales) Marc Thomas from (Wales) Cardiff Blues

=== Players Out ===
- (England) Ryan Burrows to (England) Newcastle Falcons
- (England) Lewis Boyce to (England) Harlequins
- (Tonga) Sione Faletau to (England) Bristol
- (England) Taylor Prell to (England) Warrington Wolves
- (England) Dean Schofield retired
- (England) Phil Nilsen to (England) Coventry
- (England) Seb Stegmann to (England) Ealing Trailfinders
- (England) Alex Gray retired
- (England) Guy Borrowdale to (England) Rotherham Titans
- (England) Joe Ford to (England) Leicester Tigers
- (England) Jonah Holmes to (England) Leicester Tigers
- (South Africa) Warren Seals to (England) Darlington Mowden Park
- (England) Andy Saull retired

== See also ==
- List of 2017–18 Premiership Rugby transfers
- List of 2017–18 Pro14 transfers
- List of 2017–18 Super Rugby transfers
- List of 2017–18 Top 14 transfers
