= List of 2015–16 Premiership Rugby transfers =

This is a list of player transfers involving Aviva Premiership teams leading up to and including the 2015–16 season. The list is of deals that are confirmed and are either from or to a rugby union team in the Premier League during the 2014–15 season or 2015–16 season. It is not unknown for confirmed deals to be cancelled at a later date.

== Bath ==
=== Players In ===
- (Fiji) Nikola Matawalu from (Scotland) Glasgow Warriors
- (Wales) Rhys Priestland from (Wales) Scarlets
- (England) Tom Dunn promoted from Academy
- (England) Charlie Ewels promoted from Academy
- (England) Tom Homer from (England) London Irish
- (Wales) Jonathan Evans from (Wales) Newport Gwent Dragons
- Jeff Williams from England Sevens
- (Scotland) David Denton from (Scotland) Edinburgh Rugby

=== Players Out ===
- (Wales) Paul James to (Wales) Ospreys
- (Wales) Gavin Henson to (England) Bristol Rugby
- (England) Olly Woodburn to (England) Exeter Chiefs
- (England) Micky Young to (England) Newcastle Falcons
- (England) Dave Sisi to (England) London Irish (season-loan)
- (England) Will Skuse to (England) London Welsh
- (England) Richard Lane to (England) Jersey
- (Ireland) Peter Stringer to (England) Sale Sharks
- (England) Carl Fearns to (France) Lyon
- (England) Ben Williams retired
- (England) Sam Burgess to (Australia) South Sydney Rabbitohs

== Exeter Chiefs ==
=== Players In ===
- (England) Geoff Parling from (England) Leicester Tigers
- (England) Olly Woodburn from (England) Bath Rugby
- (Italy) Michele Campagnaro from (Italy) Benetton Treviso
- (Scotland) Ollie Atkins from (Scotland) Edinburgh Rugby
- (South Africa) Shaun Malton from (England) Nottingham
- (England) Will Hooley from (England) Northampton Saints
- (England) Harry Williams from (England) Jersey
- (Australia) Julian Salvi from (England) Leicester Tigers
- (England) Josh Jones from (England) St. Helens
- (England) Jonny Hill from (England) Gloucester Rugby
- (England) James Short from (England) London Irish

=== Players Out ===
- (Wales) Tom James to (Wales) Cardiff Blues
- (England) Greg Bateman to (England) Leicester Tigers
- (Australia) Dean Mumm to (Australia) NSW Waratahs
- (England) Kieran Davies to (England) Nottingham
- (Tonga) Fetuʻu Vainikolo to (France) Oyonnax
- (England) Joel Conlon to (England) Saracens
- (Wales) Ceri Sweeney to (Wales) Pontypridd RFC
- (England) James Scaysbrook retired
- (England) Will Carrick-Smith to (England) London Scottish

== Gloucester ==
=== Players In ===
- (New Zealand) Tom Marshall from (New Zealand) Chiefs
- (England) Henry Purdy promoted from Academy
- (New Zealand) Jeremy Thrush from (New Zealand) Hurricanes
- (Australia) Bill Meakes promoted from Academy
- (England) Paul Doran-Jones from (England) Harlequins
- (Ireland) Paddy McAllister from (France) Aurillac
- (Wales) Nicky Thomas from (Wales) Ospreys
- (New Zealand) Willi Heinz from (New Zealand) Crusaders
- (England) Tom Lindsay from (England) Wasps
- (England) Tom Hicks promoted from Academy
- (England) Mat Protheroe from (England) Hartpury RFC
- (England) Callum Braley promoted from Academy
- (Wales) Steph Reynolds promoted from Academy
- (New Zealand) Joe Latta from (New Zealand) Highlanders

=== Players Out ===
- (England) Dan Robson to (England) Wasps
- (Wales) Aled Thomas to (Wales) Scarlets
- (Tonga) Aleki Lutui to (England) Ampthill
- (England) Tom Palmer to (Italy) Benetton Treviso
- (Wales) Rory Bartle to (England) London Scottish
- (England) Jonny Hill to (England) Exeter Chiefs
- (England) Shaun Knight to (Wales) Newport Gwent Dragons
- (Ireland) Shane Monahan to (Ireland) Munster
- (Tonga) Sila Puafisi to (Scotland) Glasgow Warriors

== Harlequins ==
=== Players In ===
- (Australia) James Horwill from (Australia) Queensland Reds
- (England) Matt Shields from (England) Darlington Mowden Park
- (Wales) Adam Jones from (Wales) Cardiff Blues
- (Scotland) Tim Visser from (Scotland) Edinburgh Rugby
- (Wales) Owen Evans from (Wales) Newport Gwent Dragons
- (South Africa) Tim Swiel from (South Africa) Sharks
- (Samoa) Winston Stanley from (New Zealand) Highlanders
- (Wales) Jamie Roberts from (France) Racing 92
- (New Zealand) Mat Luamanu from (Italy) Benetton Treviso
- (England) Harry Sloan promoted from Academy

=== Players Out ===
- (England) Paul Doran-Jones to (England) Gloucester Rugby
- (England) Joe Trayfoot to (England) London Irish
- (England) George Robson to (France) Oyonnax
- (England) Ugo Monye retired
- (Fiji) Asaeli Tikoirotuma to (England) London Irish
- (England) Darryl Marfo to (England) London Welsh
- (England) Tom Williams retired
- (England) Tom Casson to (England) Yorkshire Carnegie
- (England) Jordan Burns to (England) Bedford Blues
- (England) Jordan Turner-Hall retired

== Leicester Tigers ==
=== Players In ===
- (Tonga) Opeti Fonua from (England) London Welsh
- (Zimbabwe) Mike Williams from (England) Worcester Warriors
- (New Zealand) Brendon O'Connor from (New Zealand) Blues
- (Australia) Peter Betham from (Australia) NSW Waratahs
- (New Zealand) Michael Fitzgerald from (New Zealand) Chiefs
- (Australia) Lachlan McCaffrey from (England) London Welsh
- (New Zealand) Jono Kitto from (New Zealand) Chiefs
- (England) Greg Bateman from (England) Exeter Chiefs
- (England) Dominic Barrow from (England) Newcastle Falcons
- (England) George Catchpole promoted from Academy
- (Samoa) Aniseko Sio promoted from Academy
- (Tonga) Telusa Veainu from (Australia) Melbourne Rebels
- (South Africa) Jean de Villiers from (South Africa) Stormers
- (Italy) Matías Agüero from (Italy) Zebre

=== Players Out ===
- (England) Jamie Gibson to (England) Northampton Saints
- (England) Geoff Parling to (England) Exeter Chiefs
- (England) Neil Briggs to (England) Sale Sharks
- (Argentina) Pablo Matera to (Argentina) Pampas XV
- (England) Louis Deacon retired
- (United States) Blaine Scully to (Wales) Cardiff Blues
- (England) Tom Price to (Wales) Scarlets
- (New Zealand) Brad Thorn retired
- (New Zealand) Javiah Pohe to (France) US Carcassonne
- (New Zealand) Scott Hamilton to (England) Coventry RFC
- (Italy) Robert Barbieri to (Italy) Benetton Treviso
- (United States) Greg Peterson to (Scotland) Glasgow Warriors
- (Australia) Julian Salvi to (England) Exeter Chiefs
- (England) Tom Bristow to (England) Wasps
- (New Zealand) Jack Whetton to (France) USO Nevers
- (France) David Mele to (France) Toulouse
- (Wales) Rhys Williams to (England) Moseley
- (England) Anthony Allen retired
- (New Zealand) Terrence Hepetema to (New Zealand) Bay of Plenty

== London Irish ==
=== Players In ===
- (New Zealand) Ben Franks from (New Zealand) Hurricanes
- (Scotland) Sean Maitland from (Scotland) Glasgow Warriors
- (Australia) Brendan McKibbin from (Australia) New South Wales Waratahs
- (England) Joe Trayfoot from (England) Harlequins
- (England) Dominic Waldouck from (England) Northampton Saints
- (England) Dave Sisi from (England) Bath Rugby (season-loan)
- (England) Matt Symons from (New Zealand) Chiefs
- (England) Tom Cruse from (England) Rotherham Titans
- (Ireland) Eoin Sheriff from (England) Saracens
- (Fiji) Asaeli Tikoirotuma from (England) Harlequins
- (England) Gerard Ellis promoted from Academy
- (South Africa) Richard Palframan promoted from Academy
- (England) Tom Fowlie promoted from Academy
- (England) Tom Smallbone promoted from Academy
- (Wales) Rob McCusker from (Wales) Scarlets
- (Canada) Ciaran Hearn from (Canada) The Rock
- (New Zealand) Will Lloyd from (New Zealand) Auckland

=== Players Out ===
- (Ireland) Tomás O'Leary to (Ireland) Munster
- (England) Tom Homer to (England) Bath Rugby
- (Scotland) Kieran Low to (Scotland) Glasgow Warriors
- (Ireland) Eamonn Sheridan to (France) Oyonnax
- (England) Sean Cox retired
- (Australia) Myles Dorrian to (England) Bedford Blues
- (England) Guy Armitage to (England) London Welsh
- (England) Harry Allen to (England) London Welsh
- (Samoa) Daniel Leo to (England) London Welsh
- (Ireland) Jamie Hagan to (Australia) Melbourne Rebels
- (England) James Short to (England) Exeter Chiefs
- (New Zealand) Michael Mayhew to (New Zealand) Waikato
- (England) Matt Parr released

== Newcastle Falcons ==
=== Players In ===
- (England) Chris Harris promoted from Academy
- (England) Micky Young from (England) Bath Rugby
- (New Zealand) Mike Delany from (France) Clermont Auvergne
- Marcus Watson from England Sevens
- (Tonga) Sonatane Takulua from (New Zealand) Northland
- (England) Simon Hammersley promoted from Academy
- (England) Ben Harris from (England) Yorkshire Carnegie
- (Tonga) Taione Vea from (England) London Welsh
- (Scotland) Jon Welsh from (Scotland) Glasgow Warriors
- (Tonga) Nili Latu from (Japan) NEC Green Rockets
- (Italy) Giovanbattista Venditti from (Italy) Zebre
- (Ireland) Paddy Ryan from (France) Libournes
- (England) Mouritz Botha from (South Africa) Sharks
- (England) Sean Robinson promoted from Academy
- (United States) Todd Clever from (United States) Old Mission Beach Athletic Club
- (Argentina) Belisario Agulla from (France) Agen

=== Players Out ===
- (England) Kieran Brookes to (England) Northampton Saints
- (Scotland) Mike Blair to (Scotland) Glasgow Warriors
- (England) Andy Saull to (England) Yorkshire Carnegie
- (England) Ben Morris to (England) Nottingham
- (Scotland) Phil Godman retired
- (England) Chris York to (England) Ealing Trailfinders
- (Ireland) Danny Barnes to (England) Ealing Trailfinders
- (England) Dominic Barrow to (England) Leicester Tigers
- (England) Andy Davies to (England) Rotherham Titans
- (England) Mark Irving to (Italy) Viadana
- (England) Rory Clegg to (Scotland) Glasgow Warriors
- (England) Lee Smith to (England) Wakefield Trinity Wildcats
- (England) Oliver Tomaszczyk to (Wales) Ospreys
- (Tonga) Uili Koloʻofai to (England) Jersey
- (England) Noah Cato released
- (Samoa) Jamie Helleur released
- (Wales) Warren Fury released
- (England) Sean Brown released
- (England) James Christie released

== Northampton Saints ==
=== Players In ===
- (Ireland) JJ Hanrahan from (Ireland) Munster
- (England) Kieran Brookes from (England) Newcastle Falcons
- (England) Jamie Gibson from (England) Leicester Tigers
- (England) Michael Paterson from (England) Sale Sharks
- (England) Tom Kessell from (England) Cornish Pirates
- (South Africa) Pat Howard from (South Africa) Stormers
- (England) Paul Hill from (England) Yorkshire Carnegie
- (Wales) Sion Bennett from (Wales) Scarlets
- (South Africa) Victor Matfield from (South Africa) Bulls

=== Players Out ===
- (Australia) Salesi Ma'afu to (France) Toulon
- (United States) Samu Manoa to (France) Toulon
- (England) Phil Dowson to (England) Worcester Warriors
- (England) Dominic Waldouck to (England) London Irish
- (England) Will Hooley to (England) Exeter Chiefs
- (England) Alex Day to (England) Cornish Pirates
- (England) Joel Hodgson to (England) Yorkshire Carnegie
- (Scotland) Tom Ryder to (England) Yorkshire Carnegie
- (United States) Cam Dolan to (Wales) Cardiff Blues
- (England) Josh Skelcey to (England) Nottingham
- (England) Tom Mercey released

== Sale Sharks ==
=== Players In ===
- (England) Neil Briggs from (England) Leicester Tigers
- (Ireland) Peter Stringer from (England) Bath Rugby
- (New Zealand) Bryn Evans from (France) Biarritz Olympique
- (England) James Mitchell promoted from Academy
- (Wales) George Nott promoted from Academy
- (England) Ciaran Parker promoted from Academy
- (South Africa) Brian Mujati from (France) Racing 92
- (England) Nev Edwards from (England) Rosslyn Park

=== Players Out ===
- (Wales) Marc Jones to (England) Bristol Rugby
- (England) Mark Cueto retired
- (England) Michael Paterson to (England) Northampton Saints
- (England) Will Cliff to (England) Bristol Rugby
- (England) Nathan Fowles to (Scotland) Edinburgh Rugby
- (Scotland) Nathan Hines retired
- (England) Andy Forsyth to (England) Yorkshire Carnegie
- (Italy) Alberto De Marchi to (Italy) Benetton Treviso
- (Italy) Luke McLean to (Italy) Benetton Treviso
- (England) Darren Fearn to (England) Darlington Mowden Park

== Saracens ==
=== Players In ===
- (Italy) Samuela Vunisa from (Italy) Zebre
- (South Africa) Michael Rhodes from (South Africa) Stormers
- (England) Maro Itoje promoted from Academy
- (England) Joel Conlon from (England) Exeter Chiefs
- (Australia) Dave Porecki from (Australia) Manly

=== Players Out ===
- (Ireland) Eoin Sheriff to (England) London Irish
- (England) David Strettle to (France) Clermont Auvergne
- (Samoa) James Johnston to (England) Wasps
- (United States) Thretton Palamo to (England) London Welsh (season-loan)
- (South Africa) Nick de Jager to (South Africa) Blue Bulls
- (South Africa) Ernst Joubert retired

== Wasps ==
=== Players In ===
- (New Zealand) Jimmy Gopperth from (Ireland) Leinster
- (England) Dan Robson from (England) Gloucester Rugby
- (New Zealand) Frank Halai from (New Zealand) Blues
- (Ireland) Brendan Macken from (Ireland) Leinster
- (England) Tom Bristow from (England) Leicester Tigers
- (Scotland) Jamie Stevenson from (England) London Scottish
- (Ireland) James Downey from (Scotland) Glasgow Warriors
- (Australia) George Smith from (France) Lyon
- (Samoa) James Johnston from (England) Saracens
- (England) Alex Rieder from (England) Rotherham Titans
- (England) Alex Lundberg promoted from Academy
- (England) Tom Howe promoted from Academy
- (New Zealand) Charles Piutau from (New Zealand) Blues

=== Players Out ===
- (England) Tom Varndell to (England) Bristol Rugby
- (Tonga) William Helu to (Scotland) Edinburgh Rugby
- (England) Ed Jackson to (Wales) Newport Gwent Dragons
- (England) Charlie Davies to (Wales) Newport Gwent Dragons
- (England) Tom Lindsay to (England) Gloucester Rugby
- (Wales) Will Taylor to (Wales) Scarlets
- (Wales) Jack Moates to (England) Jersey
- (England) Oli Evans to (England) Jersey
- (United States) Tom Bliss to (England) Ealing Trailfinders (season-loan)
- (Scotland) Sam James to (England) Bedford Blues
- (Wales) Martyn Thomas to (England) London Welsh
- (England) Gus Jones to (England) London Welsh
- (England) Glyn Hughes to (England) Moseley
- (England) Buster Lawrence to (England) Moseley
- (Wales) John Yapp retired
- (England) Chris Bell retired
- (England) Andy Goode retired

== Worcester Warriors ==
=== Players In ===
- (England) Andy Short from (England) Bristol Rugby
- (Italy) Derrick Appiah from (Italy) Mogliano
- (England) Phil Dowson from (England) Northampton Saints
- (England) Carl Kirwan from (England) London Welsh
- (Scotland) Tom Heathcote from (Scotland) Edinburgh Rugby
- (England) Luke Baldwin from (England) Bristol Rugby
- (Wales) Sam Lewis from (Wales) Ospreys
- (Australia) Cooper Vuna from (Japan) Toshiba Brave Lupus
- (Samoa) Na'ama Leleimalefaga from (France) Montpellier
- (England) Darren Barry from (England) Cornish Pirates
- (New Zealand) Bryce Heem from (New Zealand) Chiefs
- (England) Mike Daniels promoted from Academy
- (England) Tiff Eden promoted from Academy
- (England) Christian Scotland-Williamson promoted from Academy
- (Zimbabwe) Marco Mama from (England) Bristol Rugby (season-loan)
- (Ireland) Donncha O'Callaghan from (Ireland) Munster
- (Fiji) Tevita Cavubati from (Wales) Ospreys
- (South Africa) Wynand Olivier from (France) Montpellier
- (Georgia (country)) Jaba Bregvadze from (Georgia (country)) RC Kochebi Bolnisi

=== Players Out ===
- (Wales) Andries Pretorius retired
- (Zimbabwe) Mike Williams to (England) Leicester Tigers
- (Romania) Alex Gordaș to (Romania) CSM București
- (Australia) Sam Windsor to (Ireland) Ulster
- (Argentina) Agustin Creevy to (Argentina) Jaguares
- (Scotland) Jack Cosgrove to (Scotland) Edinburgh Rugby
- (England) Josh Drauniniu to (England) London Welsh
- (England) George Porter to (England) Ealing Trailfinders
- (England) Rob O'Donnell to (England) Yorkshire Carnegie
- Richard de Carpentier to England Sevens
- Josh Watkins to England Sevens
- (England) James Percival to (France) Grenoble
- (England) Shay Kerry to (France) Oyonnax
- (Tonga) Ofa Faingaʻanuku to (France) Bayonne
- (England) James Stephenson to (England) Ealing Trailfinders
- (Argentina) Ignacio Mieres to (France) US Dax
- (Wales) Jonathan Thomas retired
- (Argentina) Leonardo Senatore to (Argentina) Jaguares

== See also ==
- List of 2015–16 Pro12 transfers
- List of 2015–16 RFU Championship transfers
- List of 2015–16 Super Rugby transfers
- List of 2015 SuperLiga transfers
- List of 2015–16 Top 14 transfers
