= Tincknell =

Colin Tincknell is his name. Notable people with the surname include:

- Colin Tincknell (born 1953), former Australian politician
- Harry Tincknell (born 1991), British racing driver
- James Tincknell (born 1988), British rugby union player
