= Kevin John Davies =

Kevin John Davies may refer to:

- Kevin John Davies, Surveyor General of Queensland in 1982–1990
- Kevin Jon Davies, British television and video director

== See also ==
- Kevin Davies (disambiguation)
