= Kevin Davis =

Kevin Davis may refer to:

- Kevin Davis (rugby union) (born 1986), rugby union player
- Kevin Davis (gymnast) (born 1966), American Olympic gymnast
- Kevin Davis (police officer) (born 1968 or 1969), American police officer
- Kevin Davis (politician), mayor of Brantford, Ontario
- Kevin Davis (Gaelic footballer), Irish Gaelic football player
- Kevin Davis (ATWT), a character in the US television soap opera As The World Turns
- Kevin Davis (author), author of The Brain Defense, see Helen S. Mayberg
- Kevin Davis, Blue Angels pilot killed in the 2007 Blue Angels South Carolina crash
- Kevin Davis, engineer in the recording industry (see 46th Grammy Awards)
- Colonel Kevin A. Davis, pleaded guilty to taking bribes, see Cockerham bribery case

== See also ==
- Kevin Davies (disambiguation)
