= 2016–17 RFU Championship =

- Countries: England; Jersey
- Date: 3 September 2016 – 24 May 2017
- Champions: London Irish (1st title)
- Runners-up: Yorkshire Carnegie
- Relegated: none
- Matches played: 129
- Attendance: 229,202 (average 1,777 per match)
- Highest attendance: 11,671; London Irish v Cornish Pirates (18 March 2017)
- Lowest attendance: 438; Ealing Trailfinders v Jersey Reds (17 September 2016)
- Tries scored: 742 (average 5.8 per match)
- Top point scorer: (England) Tommy Bell (London Irish) 253
- Top try scorer: (England) Jonah Holmes (Yorkshire Carnegie) 16

The 2016–17 RFU Championship, known for sponsorship reasons as the Greene King IPA Championship, is the eighth season of the professionalised format of the RFU Championship, the second tier of the English rugby union league system run by the Rugby Football Union. It is contested by eleven English clubs and one from Jersey in the Channel Islands. This will be the fourth year of the competition's sponsorship with Greene King Brewery. The twelve teams in the RFU Championship also compete in the British and Irish Cup, along with clubs from Ireland and Wales. Some matches in the RFU Championship are broadcast on Sky Sports.

On 24 January 2017 London Welsh were expelled from the championship after failing to meet the conditions required by the RFU to extend a temporary licence granted after their liquidation. The club's record for the season was expunged. The RFU announced that no team would be relegated from the Championship at the end of the season.

== Structure ==
The Championship's structure has all the teams playing each other on a home and away basis. The play-off structure will remain the same as the previous year. The top four teams at the end of the home-and-away season qualify for the promotion play-offs which follow a 1 v 4, 2 v 3 system. The winners have to meet the RFU's Minimum Standards Criteria in order to be promoted to the English Premiership. There is no promotion if a ground fails to meet the criteria. Unlike previous seasons there will be no relegation from the league this year.

In 2015 the RFU increased annual funding to over £500,000 per club, an agreement which will last until 2020. Despite this, Cornish Pirates stated more money was needed in RFU grants to support a fully professional second tier.

The 2016–17 season was also the last for play-offs in the Championship for three seasons. Starting with the 2017–18 season, the play-offs will be replaced by automatic promotion for the team that finishes first in the home-and-away season, provided said team meets the Minimum Standards Criteria.

== Teams ==
Locations of the 2016–17 RFU Championship teams

After ten seasons in the Championship Birmingham Moseley were relegated following their last place finish in 2016. They are replaced by Richmond, who won the National League 1 and return to the second tier for the first time since 1997. Richmond subsequently entered administration and dropped eight tiers following two seasons in the premiership between 1997 and 1999. As a result, Richmond stated that they would remain semi-professional and not sign any professional players despite the RFU Championship being fully professional. London Irish, an original founder of the professional English Premiership, join the league after relegation from the 2015–16 Aviva Premiership, finishing bottom of the table.

On 7 December 2016 London Welsh RFC went into liquidation. They were deducted 20 points but allowed to continue in the Championship until January when the RFU would decide on their future. On 24 January 2017 London Welsh were expelled from the championship after failing to meet the conditions required by the RFU to extend the temporary licence. The club's record for the season was expunged and there would be no relegation from the Championship at the end of season.

Greater London RFU Championship teams clubs

Club	Stadium	Capacity	Area	Captain	DOR/Head Coach (Note: The Director of Rugby/Head Coach list updated 2 September 2016)
Bedford Blues	Goldington Road	5,000 (1,700 seats)	Bedford, Bedfordshire	(Jersey) Michael Le Bourgeois	(Wales) Mike Rayer
Cornish Pirates	Mennaye Field	4,000 (2,200 Seats)	Penzance, Cornwall	(England) Chris Morgan	(Wales) Gavin Cattle (England) Alan Paver
Doncaster Knights	Castle Park	5,000	Doncaster, South Yorkshire	(England) Michael Hills	(Wales) Clive Griffiths
Ealing Trailfinders	Trailfinders Sports Ground	3,020 (1,020 seats)	West Ealing, London	(Ireland) Danny Kenny	(England) Ben Ward
Jersey Reds	St Peter	4,000	Saint Peter, Jersey	(England) Pierce Philips	(South Africa) Harvey Biljon
London Irish	Madejski Stadium	24,161 (Note: Although Madejski's full capacity is 24,161, for most matches only the West Stand will be open with capacity of 7,579.)	Reading, Berkshire	(England) Luke Narraway	(England) Nick Kennedy
London Scottish	Athletic Ground, Richmond	4,500 (1,000 seats)	Richmond, London	(Wales) Rory Bartle	(Scotland) Sean Lineen
London Welsh (Note: London Welsh started the season but were expelled from the league on 24 January 2017)	Old Deer Park	5,850 (1,000 seats)	Richmond, London	(England) Matt Corker	(England) James Buckland
Nottingham	Lady Bay Sports Ground	3,000	Nottingham, Nottinghamshire	(England) Matt Everard	Ian Costello
Richmond	Athletic Ground, Richmond	4,500 (1,000 seats)	Richmond, London	(England) Will Warden	(England) Steve Hill
Rotherham Titans	Clifton Lane	2,500	Rotherham, South Yorkshire	(England) Tom Holmes	(Wales) Justin Burnell
Yorkshire Carnegie	Headingley Carnegie Stadium	21,062	Leeds, West Yorkshire	(England) Ryan Burrows	(Scotland) Ian McGeechan

== Table ==
2016–17 RFU Championship table
Pos	Team	Pld	W	D	L	PF	PA	PD	TB	LB	Pts	Qualification
1	London Irish (C)	20	19	0	1	712	290	+422	14	1	91	Promotion play-off
2	Yorkshire Carnegie (F)	20	15	0	5	619	461	+158	12	3	75	Promotion play-off
3	Ealing Trailfinders (SF) (Note: Had either Ealing or Doncaster won the play-offs, they would not have accepted promotion, causing no side to be promoted and the bottom Premiership club retaining their place. This did not happen, as London Irish and Yorkshire Carnegie (both of which met the Premiership's minimum standards) won the play-off semi-finals.)	20	12	1	7	584	427	+157	7	3	60	Promotion play-off
4	Doncaster Knights (SF)	20	12	0	8	514	424	+90	9	1	58	Promotion play-off
5	Jersey Reds	20	11	0	9	459	451	+8	7	7	58	
6	Cornish Pirates	20	9	2	9	559	497	+62	8	7	55	
7	Bedford Blues	20	6	1	13	496	569	−73	10	5	41	
8	London Scottish	20	7	0	13	465	605	−140	7	5	40	
9	Nottingham Rugby	20	7	1	12	419	542	−123	4	5	39	
10	Richmond	20	5	0	15	347	585	−238	4	2	26	
11	Rotherham Titans	20	4	1	15	333	656	−323	2	2	22	

Updated to match(es) played on 15 April 2017. Source: "Greene King IPA Championship". England Rugby. RFU.
Rules for classification: If teams are level at any stage, tiebreakers are applied in the following order
1. Number of matches won
2. Difference between points for and against
3. Total number of points for
4. Aggregate number of points scored in matches between tied teams
5. Number of matches won excluding the first match, then the second and so on until the tie is settled
  Notes:

== Fixtures ==
Fixtures for the season were announced by the RFU on 8 July 2016.

=== Round 1 ===
3 September 2016
14:00

Richmond	16 – 41	Jersey Reds (BP)
	Richmond; Jersey

Athletic Ground
Attendance: 893
Referee: Dean Richards

3 September 2016
15:00

Bedford Blues	17 – 26	Cornish Pirates
	Bedford; Pirates

Goldington Road
Attendance: 2,033
Referee: Simon Harding

3 September 2016
15:00

Ealing Trailfinders	13 – 30	Yorkshire Carnegie (BP)
	Ealing; Carnegie

Trailfinders Sports Ground
Attendance: 635
Referee: Darren Gamage

3 September 2016
15:00

London Irish	19 – 0	Doncaster Knights
	Irish; Doncaster

Madejski Stadium
Attendance: 3,503
Referee: Craig Maxwell-Keys

4 September 2016
14:00

(BP) Rotherham Titans	33 – 32	London Welsh (2BP)
	Rotherham; Welsh

Clifton Lane
Attendance: 1,382
Referee: Christophe Ridley

4 September 2016
15:00

Nottingham	25 – 22	London Scottish (BP)
	Nottingham; Scottish

Lady Bay Sports Ground
Attendance: 924
Referee: Andrew Jackson

=== Round 2 ===
10 September 2016
14:30

Doncaster Knights	25 – 13	Rotherham Titans
	Doncaster; Rotherham

Castle Park
Attendance: 1,831
Referee: Matt O'Grady

10 September 2016
15:00

Jersey Reds	14 – 9	Bedford Blues (BP)
	Jersey; Bedford

St Peter
Attendance: 1,630
Referee: Andrew Jackson

10 September 2016
15:00

(BP) London Irish	36 – 12	Richmond
	Irish; Richmond

Madejski Stadium
Attendance: 3,303
Referee: Tim Baker

10 September 2016
15:00

London Scottish	9 – 36	London Welsh
	Scottish; Welsh

Athletic Ground
Attendance: 1,146
Referee: Tim Wigglesworth

11 September 2016
14:00

(BP) Cornish Pirates	31 – 31	Ealing Trailfinders (BP)
	Pirates; Ealing

Mennaye Field
Attendance: 1,347
Referee: Christophe Ridley

11 September 2016
15:00

Yorkshire Carnegie	26 – 24	Nottingham (2BP)
	Carnegie; Nottingham

Headingley Carnegie Stadium
Attendance: 1,378
Referee: Greg Macdonald

=== Round 3 ===
17 September 2016
14:00

Ealing Trailfinders	20 – 15	Jersey Reds (BP)
	Ealing; Jersey

Trailfinders Sports Ground
Attendance: 438
Referee: Dean Richards

17 September 2016
14:00

(BP) London Welsh	22 – 23	Yorkshire Carnegie
	Welsh; Carnegie

Old Deer Park
Attendance: 1,012
Referee: John Meredith

17 September 2016
15:00

(BP) Bedford Blues	25 – 30	London Irish (BP)
	Bedford; Irish

Goldington Road
Attendance: 2,585
Referee: Greg MacDonald

17 September 2016
15:00

Richmond	16 – 57	Doncaster Knights (BP)
	Richmond; Doncaster

Athletic Ground
Attendance: 654
Referee: Andrew Jackson

17 September 2016
15:00

(BP) Rotherham Titans	30 – 31	London Scottish (BP)
	Rotherham; Scottish

Clifton Lane
Attendance: 1,154
Referee: Michael Hudson

18 September 2016
15:00

Nottingham	19 – 35	Cornish Pirates (BP)
	Nottingham; Pirates

Lady Bay Sports Ground
Attendance: 1,005
Referee: Steve Lee

=== Round 4 ===
23 September 2016
19:45

(BP) Jersey Reds	21 – 22	Nottingham
	Jersey; Nottingham

St Peter
Attendance: 1,723
Referee: Ian Tempest

24 September 2016
14:30

(BP) Doncaster Knights	30 – 22	Bedford Blues (BP)
	Doncaster; Bedford

Castle Park
Attendance: 1,079
Referee: John Meredith

24 September 2016
15:00

Richmond	8 – 18	Rotherham Titans
	Richmond; Rotherham

Athletic Ground
Attendance: 658
Referee: Fergus Kirby

25 September 2016
14:00

Cornish Pirates	16 – 10	London Welsh (BP)
	Pirates; Welsh

Mennaye Field
Attendance: 1,495
Referee: Paul Andrew

25 September 2016
15:00

(BP) London Irish	32 – 12	Ealing Trailfinders
	Irish; Ealing

Madejski Stadium
Attendance: 3,357
Referee: Matthew O’Grady

25 September 2016
15:00

(BP) Yorkshire Carnegie	39 – 29	London Scottish (BP)
	Carnegie; Scottish

Headingley Carnegie Stadium
Attendance: 1,807
Referee: Christopher Ridley

=== Round 5 ===
30 September 2016
19:45

Nottingham	7 – 29	London Irish (BP)
	Nottingham; Irish

Lady Bay Sports Ground
Attendance: 1,538
Referee: Andrew Jackson

1 October 2016
14:00

London Welsh	23 – 18	Jersey Reds (BP)
	Welsh; Jersey

Old Deer Park
Attendance: 789
Referee: Darren Gamage

1 October 2016
15:00

(BP) Bedford Blues	34 – 14	Richmond
	Bedford; Richmond

Goldington Road
Attendance: 2,009
Referee: Matthew O'Grady

1 October 2016
15:00

Ealing Trailfinders	27 – 14	Doncaster Knights
	Ealing; Doncaster

Trailfinders Sports Ground
Attendance: 629
Referee: Fergus Kirby

1 October 2016
15:00

London Scottish	25 – 24	Cornish Pirates (BP)
	Scottish; Pirates

Athletic Ground
Attendance: 955
Referee: Simon Harding

1 October 2016
15:00

Rotherham Titans	21 – 37	Yorkshire Carnegie (BP)
	Rotherham; Carnegie

Clifton Lane
Attendance: 1,237
Referee: Steve Lee

=== Round 6 ===
7 October 2016
19:45

Bedford Blues	17 – 16	Rotherham Titans (BP)
	Bedford; Rotherham

Goldington Road
Attendance: 2,398
Referee: Greg McDonald

8 October 2016
14:30

Doncaster Knights	26 – 21	Nottingham (BP)
	Doncaster; Nottingham

Castle Park
Attendance: 1,368
Referee: Darren Gamage

8 October 2016
15:00

Jersey Reds	10 – 36	London Scottish (BP)
	Jersey; Scottish

St Peter
Attendance: 1,702
Referee: John Meredith

8 October 2016
15:00

(BP) London Irish	35 – 12	London Welsh
	Irish; Welsh

Madejski Stadium
Attendance: 4,025
Referee: Christophe Ridley

9 October 2016
15:00

(BP) Cornish Pirates	28 – 35	Yorkshire Carnegie (BP)
	Pirates; Carnegie

Mennaye Field
Attendance: 1,477
Referee: Luke Pearce

9 October 2016
15:00

Richmond	12 – 38	Ealing Trailfinders (BP)
	Richmond; Ealing

Athletic Ground
Attendance: 1,108
Referee: Andrew Jackson

=== Round 7 ===
28 October 2016
20:00

(BP) Yorkshire Carnegie	35 – 29	Jersey Reds (2BP)
	Yorkshire Carnegie; Jersey

Headingley Carnegie Stadium
Attendance: 1,914
Referee: Tim Wigglesworth

29 October 2016
14:00

London Welsh	14 – 10	Doncaster Knights (BP)
	Welsh; Doncaster

Old Deer Park
Attendance: 1,025
Referee: Andrew Jackson

29 October 2016
15:00

Ealing Trailfinders	24 – 23	Bedford Blues (BP)
	Ealing; Bedford

Trailfinders Sports Ground
Attendance: 789
Referee: Jack Makepeace

29 October 2016
15:00

Rotherham Titans	26 – 24	Cornish Pirates (BP)
	Rotherham; Pirates

Clifton Lane
Attendance: 1,021
Referee: Matthew O'Grady

30 October 2016
15:00

London Scottish	12 – 62	London Irish (BP)
	Irish; Report

Athletic Ground
Attendance: 2,339
Referee: Christophe Ridley

30 October 2016
15:00

Nottingham	20 – 8	Richmond
	Nottingham; Richmond

Lady Bay Sports Ground
Attendance: 1,015
Referee: Mike Hudson

=== Round 8 ===
5 November 2016
14:30

(BP) Doncaster Knights	29 – 23	London Scottish (BP)
	Doncaster; Scottish

Castle Park
Attendance: 1,339
Referee: Darren Gamage

5 November 2016
15:00

(2BP) Bedford Blues	34 – 36	Nottingham (BP)
	Bedford; Nottingham

Goldington Road
Attendance: 2,487
Referee: Tom Foley

5 November 2016
15:00

(BP) Ealing Trailfinders	50 – 24	Rotherham Titans (BP)
	Ealing; Rotherham

Trailfinders Sports Ground
Attendance: 638
Referee: Simon Harding

5 November 2016
15:00

Jersey Reds	27 – 24	Cornish Pirates (BP)
	Jersey; Pirates

St Peter
Attendance: 1,504
Referee: Steve Lee

5 November 2016
15:00

(BP) London Irish	41 – 17	Yorkshire Carnegie
	Irish; Carnegie

Madejski Stadium
Attendance: 4,067
Referee: Ian Tempest

5 November 2016
15:00

Richmond	5 – 33	London Welsh (BP)
	Richmond; Welsh

Athletic Ground
Attendance: 961
Referee: Wayne Barnes

=== Round 9 ===
18 November 2016
19:00

(BP) London Scottish	16 – 17	Richmond
	Scottish; Richmond

Athletic Ground
Attendance: 1,684
Referee: Simon Harding

18 November 2016
19:45

Nottingham	17 – 13	Ealing Trailfinders (BP)
	Nottingham; Ealing

Lady Bay Sports Ground
Attendance: 1,050
Referee: Matt O'Grady

18 November 2016
20:00

Yorkshire Carnegie	24 – 6	Doncaster Knights
	Carnegie; Doncaster

Headingley Carnegie Stadium
Attendance: 2,617
Referee: Steve Lee

19 November 2016
12:00

London Welsh	25 – 38	Bedford Blues (BP)
	Welsh; Bedford

Old Deer Park
Attendance: 787
Referee: Christophe Ridley

19 November 2016
13:00

Cornish Pirates	24 – 35	London Irish (BP)
	Pirates; Irish

Mennaye Field
Attendance: 2,043
Referee: Fergus Kirby

19 November 2016
14:00

Rotherham Titans	23 – 16	Jersey Reds (BP)
	Rotherham; Jersey

Clifton Lane
Attendance: 918
Referee: Mike Hudson

=== Round 10 ===
25 November 2016
19:45

(BP) Bedford Blues	10 – 13	London Scottish
	Bedford; Scottish

Goldington Road
Attendance: 2,339
Referee: Fergus Kirby

25 November 2016
19:45

(BP) Richmond	31 – 39	Yorkshire Carnegie (BP)
	Richmond; Carnegie

Athletic Ground
Attendance: 701
Referee: Darren Gamage

26 November 2016
15:00

Ealing Trailfinders	19 – 11	London Welsh
	Ealing; Welsh

Trailfinders Sports Ground
Attendance: 792
Referee: Michael Hudson

27 November 2016
14:00

(BP) Doncaster Knights	26 – 35	Cornish Pirates
	Doncaster; Pirates

Castle Park
Attendance: 2,748
Referee: Jack Makepeace

27 November 2016
14:00

(BP) London Irish	42 – 29	Jersey Reds (BP)
	Irish; Jersey

Madejski Stadium
Attendance: 3,460
Referee: John Meredith

27 November 2016
15:00

Nottingham	19 – 19	Rotherham Titans
	Nottingham; Rotherham

Lady Bay Sports Ground
Attendance: 1,037
Referee: Christophe Ridley

=== Round 11 ===
2 December 2016
19:00

London Scottish	28 – 12	Ealing Trailfinders
	Scottish; Ealing

Athletic Ground
Attendance: 951
Referee: John Meredith

2 December 2016
20:00

(BP) Yorkshire Carnegie	28 – 15	Bedford Blues
	Bedford

Headingley Carnegie Stadium
Attendance: 1,894
Referee: Andrew Jackson

3 December 2016
14:00

(BP) London Welsh	26 – 20	Nottingham (2BP)
	Welsh; Nottingham

Old Deer Park
Attendance: 531
Referee: Jack Makepeace

3 December 2016
14:00

Rotherham Titans	10 – 38	London Irish (BP)
	Rotherham; Irish

Clifton Lane
Attendance: 1,342
Referee: Andrew Jackson

3 December 2016
14:30

(BP) Jersey Reds	35 – 29	Doncaster Knights (2BP)
	Jersey

St Peters
Attendance: 1,277
Referee: Tom Foley

4 December 2016
14:00

(BP) Cornish Pirates	23 – 26	Richmond (BP)
	Pirates

Mennaye Field
Attendance: 1,292
Referee: Matthew O’Grady

=== Round 12 ===
24 December 2016
13:15

(BP) London Welsh	37 – 5	London Scottish
	Welsh; Scottish

Old Deer Park
Attendance: 1,683
Referee: Dean Richards

24 December 2016
14:00

(BP) Ealing Trailfinders	16 – 22	Cornish Pirates
	Ealing; Pirates

Trailfinders Sports Ground
Attendance: 856
Referee: Michael Hudson

24 December 2016
15:00

(BP) Richmond	20 – 26	London Irish
	Richmond; Irish

Athletic Ground
Attendance: 2,891
Referee: Karl Dickson

26 December 2016
14:00

(BP) Nottingham	17 – 24	Yorkshire Carnegie
	Nottingham; Carnegie

Lady Bay Sports Ground
Attendance: 1,208
Referee: Fergus Kirby

26 December 2016
14:00

Rotherham Titans	12 – 23	Doncaster Knights
	Rotherham; Doncaster

Clifton Lane
Attendance: 1,872
Referee: Tim Wigglesworth

26 December 2016
15:00

(BP) Bedford Blues	39 – 37	Jersey (2BP)
	Bedford; Jersey

Goldington Road
Attendance: 4,621
Referee: Andrew Jackson

=== Round 13 ===
31 December 2016
12:30

(BP) Cornish Pirates	41 – 20	Nottingham
	Pirates; Nottingham

Mennaye Field
Attendance: 1,635
Referee: Jack Makepeace

31 December 2016
14:00

(BP) London Irish	36 – 21	Bedford Blues
	Irish; Bedford

Madejski Stadium
Attendance: 4,345
Referee: John Meredith

31 December 2016
14:30

(BP) Doncaster Knights	34 – 3	Richmond
	Doncaster; Richmond

Castle Park
Attendance: 1,337
Referee: Steve Lee

1 January 2017
14:00

(BP) Jersey Reds	13 – 19	Ealing Trailfinders
	Jersey; Ealing

St Peters
Attendance: 1,596
Referee: Christophe Ridley

1 January 2017
14:00

(BP) London Scottish	36 – 15	Rotherham Titans
	Scottish; Rotherham

Athletic Ground
Attendance: 1,126
Referee: Simon Harding

1 January 2017
15:00

Yorkshire Carnegie	20 – 13	London Welsh (BP)
	Welsh

Headingley Carnegie Stadium
Attendance: 2,117
Referee: Tim Wigglesworth

=== Round 14 ===
28 January 2017
14:30

London Scottish	14 – 26	Yorkshire Carnegie
	Scottish; Carnegie

Athletic Ground
Attendance: 1,175
Referee: Dean Richards

28 January 2017
14:00

Rotherham Titans	23 – 10	Richmond
	Rotherham; Richmond

Clifton Lane
Attendance: 913
Referee: Tom Foley

28 January 2017
15:00

(BP) Bedford Blues	22 – 40	Doncaster Knights (BP)
	Bedford; Doncaster

Goldington Road
Attendance: 1,901
Referee: Ian Tempest

28 January 2017
15:00

(BP) Ealing Trailfinders	22 – 23	London Irish
	Ealing; Irish

Trailfinders Sports Ground
Attendance: 2,630
Referee: JP Doyle

29 January 2017
15:00

(BP) Nottingham	19 – 24	Jersey Reds
	Nottingham; Jersey

Lady Bay Sports Ground
Attendance: 939
Referee: Tim Wigglesworth

=== Round 15 ===
4 February 2017
14:00

(BP) Richmond	49 – 26	Bedford Blues (BP)
	Richmond; Bedford

Athletic Ground
Attendance: 1,019
Referee: Tim Wigglesworth

4 February 2017
14:30

Doncaster Knights	21 – 29	Ealing Trailfinders
	Doncaster; Ealing

Castle Park
Attendance: 1,452
Referee: Matt Carley

5 February 2017
14:30

Cornish Pirates	25 – 24	London Scottish (BP)
	Pirates; Scottish

Mennaye Field
Attendance: 1,301
Referee: Fergus Kirby

5 February 2017
15:00

(BP) London Irish	60 – 14	Nottingham
	Irish; Nottingham

Madejski Stadium
Attendance: 2,586
Referee: Simon Harding

5 February 2017
15:00

(BP) Yorkshire Carnegie	56 – 26	Rotherham Titans (BP)
	Carnegie

Headingley Carnegie Stadium
Attendance: 1,846
Referee: Andrew Jackson

=== Round 16 ===
17 February 2017
19:45

Nottingham	7 – 29	Doncaster Knights (BP)
	Nottingham; Doncaster

Lady Bay Sports Ground
Attendance: 1,275
Referee: Luke Pearce

18 February 2017
14:00

(2BP) London Scottish	33 – 37	Jersey Reds (BP)
	Scottish; Jersey

Athletic Ground
Attendance: 1,371
Referee: Greg McDonald

18 February 2017
14:00

Rotherham Titans	21 – 36	Bedford Blues (BP)
	Rotherham; Bedford

Clifton Lane
Attendance: 859
Referee: Ben Blain

18 February 2017
15:00

(BP) Ealing Trailfinders	27 – 20	Richmond (BP)
	Ealing; Richmond

Trailfinders Sports Ground
Attendance: 1,022
Referee: Steve Lee

18 February 2017
15:00

Yorkshire Carnegie	27 – 42	Cornish Pirates (BP)
	Carnegie; Pirates

Headingley Carnegie Stadium
Attendance: 1,354
Referee: Matthew O'Grady

=== Round 17 ===
24 February 2017
19:45

Jersey Reds	24 – 19	Yorkshire Carnegie (BP)
	Jersey

St Peter
Attendance: 1,493
Referee: Christophe Ridley

25 February 2017
15:00

Bedford Blues	16 – 29	Ealing Trailfinders
	Bedford; Ealing

Goldington Road
Attendance: 2,094
Referee: Matthew O'Grady

25 February 2017
15:00

(BP) London Irish	29 – 20	London Scottish
	Irish; Scottish

Madejski Stadium
Attendance: 2,572
Referee: Michael Hudson

25 February 2017
15:00

Richmond	22 – 7	Nottingham
	Richmond; Nottingham

Athletic Ground
Attendance: 624
Referee: Fergus Kirby

26 February 2017
15:00

(BP) Cornish Pirates	34 – 5	Rotherham Titans
	Pirates; Rotherham

Mennaye Field
Attendance: 1,056
Referee: John Stevens

=== Round 18 ===
4 March 2017
14:00

London Scottish	14 – 48	Doncaster Knights (BP)
	Scottish; Doncaster

Athletic Ground
Attendance: 1,236
Referee: Christophe Ridley

4 March 2017
14:00

Rotherham Titans	12 – 51	Ealing Trailfinders (BP)
	Rotherham; Ealing

Clifton Lane
Attendance: 773
Referee: Ian Tempest

5 March 2017
14:00

(BP) Cornish Pirates	5 – 7	Jersey Reds
	Pirates; Jersey

Mennaye Field
Attendance: 1,535
Referee: Simon Harding

5 March 2017
15:00

(BP) Nottingham	21 – 24	Bedford Blues
	Nottingham; Bedford

Lady Bay Sports Ground
Attendance: 1,153
Referee: Greg Macdonald

5 March 2017
15:00

(BP) Yorkshire Carnegie	14 – 20	London Irish
	Carnegie; Irish

Headingley Carnegie Stadium
Attendance: 3,136
Referee: Luke Pearce

=== Round 19 ===
18 March 2017
14:00

(BP) London Irish	39 – 10	Cornish Pirates
	Irish; Pirates

Madejski Stadium
Attendance: 11,671 (Note: London Irish's attendance of 11,671 was a RFU Championship regular season record. Note this does not include RFU Championship playoff games or games in the old National Division One prior to the Championship's inception in 2009-10.)
Referee: Craig Maxwell-Keys

18 March 2017
14:30

Richmond	8 – 19	London Scottish
	Richmond; Scottish

Athletic Ground
Attendance: 1,575
Referee: Ben Blain

18 March 2017
15:00

(BP) Ealing Trailfinders	59 – 12	Nottingham
	Ealing; Nottingham

Trailfinders Sports Ground
Attendance: 682
Referee: Matthew O'Grady

18 March 2017
15:00

Jersey Reds	17 – 9	Rotherham Titans
	Jersey; Rotherham

St Peter
Attendance: 1,235
Referee: Andrew Jackson

19 March 2017
15:00

Doncaster Knights	31 – 26	Yorkshire Carnegie (2 BP)
	Doncaster; Carnegie

Castle Park
Attendance: 1,996
Referee: Dean Richards

=== Round 20 ===
25 March 2017
14:00

(BP) London Scottish	22 – 41	Bedford Blues (BP)
	Scottish; Bedford

Athletic Ground
Attendance: 1,301
Referee: Fergus Kirby

25 March 2017
14:00

Rotherham Titans	7 – 46	Nottingham (BP)
	Rotherham; Nottingham

Clifton Lane
Attendance: 937
Referee: John Meredith

25 March 2017
15:00

Jersey Reds	15 – 11	London Irish (BP)
	Irish; Jersey

St Peter
Attendance: 3,317
Referee: Matthew Carley

26 March 2017
15:00

(BP) Cornish Pirates	34 – 17	Doncaster Knights
	Pirates; Doncaster

Mennaye Field
Attendance: 1,248
Referee: Matthew O'Grady

26 March 2017
15:00

(BP) Yorkshire Carnegie	41 – 3	Richmond
	Carnegie; Richmond

Headingley Carnegie Stadium
Attendance: 1,164
Referee: Mike Hudson

=== Round 21 ===
8 April 2017
14:30

Doncaster Knights	24 – 20	Jersey Reds (BP)
	Doncaster; Jersey

Castle Park
Attendance: 1,698
Referee: Greg McDonald

8 April 2017
15:00

(BP) Bedford Blues	27 – 43	Yorkshire Carnegie (BP)
	Bedford; Carnegie

Goldington Road
Attendance: 2,685
Referee: Jamie Leahy

8 April 2017
15:00

(BP) Ealing Trailfinders	72 – 29	London Scottish (BP)
	Ealing; Scottish

Trailfinders Sports Ground
Attendance: 896
Referee: Jack Makepeace

8 April 2017
15:00

(BP) London Irish	82 – 3	Rotherham Titans
	Irish

Madejski Stadium
Attendance: 1,786
Referee: Simon Harding

8 April 2017
15:00

(BP) Richmond	35 – 32	Cornish Pirates (2BP)
	Richmond; Pirates

Athletic Ground
Attendance: 1,191
Referee: John Meredith

=== Round 22 ===
15 April 2017
15:00

(BP) Cornish Pirates	40 - 40	Bedford Blues (2 BP)
	Pirates; Bedford

Mennaye Field
Attendance: 1,703
Referee: Dean Richards

15 April 2017
15:00

Doncaster Knights	5 – 22	London Irish
	Doncaster; Irish

Castle Park
Attendance: 2,089
Referee: Andrew Jackson

15 April 2017
15:00

(BP) Jersey Reds	28 - 17	Richmond
	Jersey; Richmond

St Peter
Attendance: 2,210
Referee: Fergus Kirby

15 April 2017
15:00

London Scottish	19 - 46	Nottingham (BP)
	Scottish; Nottingham

Athletic Ground
Attendance: 1,130
Referee: Anthony Woodthorpe

15 April 2017
15:00

(BP) Yorkshire Carnegie	33 – 20	Ealing Trailfinders
	Ealing

Headingley Carnegie Stadium
Attendance: 1,362
Referee: Matthew O'Grady

== Play-offs ==
=== Semi-finals ===
The semi-finals follow a 1 v 4, 2 v 3 system – with the games being played over two-legs and the higher placed team choosing which leg they play at home. The matches are due to be played on 28/30 April 2017 and 5/6 May 2017. London Irish and Yorkshire finished 1st and 2nd respectively and both chose to play the second leg at home. It was announced on 27 April that both London Irish and Yorkshire Carnegie were eligible for promotion while Doncaster Knights and Ealing Trailfinders did not apply for audit for minimum standards criteria and therefore will not be promoted should they win the championship.

==== First leg ====
28 April 2017
19:45

Ealing Trailfinders	16 – 34	Yorkshire Carnegie
	Ealing; Yorkshire

Trailfinders Sports Ground
Attendance: 966
Referee: Ian Tempest

30 April 2017
15:00

Doncaster Knights	3 – 35	London Irish
	Irish; Doncaster

Castle Park
Attendance: 2,173
Referee: Luke Pearce

==== Second leg ====
5 May 2017
19:45

Yorkshire Carnegie	18 – 20	Ealing Trailfinders
	Ealing

Headingley Carnegie Stadium
Attendance: 2,216
Referee: Tim Wigglesworth

- Yorkshire Carnegie won 52 – 36 on aggregate

6 May 2017
13:15

London Irish	39 – 22	Doncaster Knights
	Irish; Doncaster

Madejski Stadium
Attendance: 4,644
Referee: Matt O’Grady

- London Irish won 74 – 25 on aggregate

=== Final ===
The final is played over two legs – with the higher placed team deciding which leg they play at home.

==== First leg ====
17 May 2017
19:45

Yorkshire Carnegie	18 – 29	London Irish
	Irish

Headingley Carnegie Stadium
Attendance: 4,126
Referee: JP Doyle

==== Second leg ====
24 May 2017
19:45

London Irish	55 – 48	Yorkshire Carnegie
	Irish

Madejski Stadium
Attendance: 7,830
Referee: Matthew Carley

- London Irish won 84 – 66 on aggregate and are promoted to the Premiership

== Attendances ==
- Includes playoff games.

Club	Home Games	Total	Average	Highest	Lowest	% Capacity
Bedford Blues	10 (Note: Due to London Welsh's expulsion Bedford only played 10 home games.)	25,152	2,515	4,621	1,901	50%
Cornish Pirates	11	16,132	1,467	2,043	1,056	37%
Doncaster Knights	11 (Note: Due to London Welsh's expulsion Doncaster only played 10 home games in the league stage. As they reached the promotion playoffs they played 11 homes games overall.)	19,110	1,737	2,748	1,079	35%
Ealing Trailfinders	12 (Note: Ealing Trailfinders played 12 home games as they reached the promotion playoff semi-finals.)	10,973	914	2,630	438	30%
Jersey Reds	10 (Note: Due to London Welsh's expulsion Jersey only played 10 home games.)	17,687	1,769	3,317	1,235	44%
London Irish	13 (Note: London Irish played 13 home games as they reached the promotion playoff final.)	57,149	4,396	11,671	1,786	18%
London Scottish	11	14,414	1,310	2,339	951	29%
London Welsh	6 (Note: London Welsh only played 6 home games as they were expelled from the Championship in January 2017 after going into liquidation.)	5,827	971	1,683	531	17%
Nottingham	10 (Note: Due to London Welsh's expulsion Nottingham only played 10 home games.)	11,144	1,114	1,538	924	37%
Richmond	11	12,275	1,116	2,891	624	25%
Rotherham Titans	11	12,408	1,128	1,872	773	45%
Yorkshire Carnegie	13 (Note: Yorkshire Carnegie played 13 home games as they reached the promotion playoff final.)	26,931	2,072	4,126	1,164	10%

== Individual statistics ==
- Note that points scorers includes tries as well as conversions, penalties and drop goals. Appearance figures also include coming on as substitutes (unused substitutes not included). Stats also cover playoff games.

=== Top points scorers ===
Rank	Player	Team	Appearances	Points
1	(England) Tommy Bell	London Irish	18	253
2	(England) Joe Ford	Yorkshire Carnegie	24	243
3	(Ireland) Peter Lydon	London Scottish	21	176
4	(Scotland) Dougie Flockhart	Doncaster Knights	18	167
5	(England) Aaron Penberthy	Ealing Trailfinders	18	161
6	(England) Laurence May	Cornish Pirates	16	148
7	(England) Rob Kirby	Richmond	20	109
8	(England) Sam Katz	Jersey Reds	12	103
9	(England) Jake Sharp	Bedford Blues	21	93
10	(England) Will Robinson	Rotherham Titans	9	83

=== Top try scorers ===
Rank	Player	Team	Appearances	Tries
1	(England) Jonah Holmes	Yorkshire Carnegie	23	16
2	(England) Tyson Lewis	Doncaster Knights	23	14
3	(England) Dean Adamson	Bedford Blues	18	13
4	(Wales) Jason Harries	London Scottish	17	11
4	(England) Tom Duncan	Cornish Pirates	20	11
5	(England) Kyle Moyle	Cornish Pirates	20	10
5	(England) David Paice	London Irish	22	10
6	(England) Miles Mantella	London Welsh / Ealing Trailfinders	14	9
6	(England) Patrick Tapley	Bedford Blues	13	9
6	(Fiji) Asaeli Tikoirotuma	London Irish	20	9

== Season records ==
- Updated to 17 May 2017

=== Team ===
Largest home win — 79 pts

82 – 3 London Irish at home to Rotherham Titans on 8 April 2017

Largest away win — 50 pts

62 – 12 London Irish away to London Scottish on 30 October 2016

Most points scored — 82 pts

82 – 3 London Irish at home to Rotherham Titans on 8 April 2017

Most tries in a match — 12

London Irish at home to Rotherham Titans on 8 April 2017

Most conversions in a match — 11

London Irish at home to Rotherham Titans on 8 April 2017

Most penalties in a match — 7

London Scottish at home to Ealing Trailfinders on 2 December 2016

Most drop goals in a match — 1

N/A - multiple teams

=== Player ===
Most points in a match — 32

(England) Tommy Bell for London Irish away to London Scottish on 30 October 2016

Most tries in a match — 3 (x9)

(England) Tyson Lewis for Doncaster Knights away to Richmond on 17 September 2016
(England) Patrick Tapley for Bedford Blues at home to Richmond on 1 October 2016
(Wales) Jason Harries for London Scottish away to Doncaster Knights on 5 November 2016
(New Zealand) TJ Harris for Nottingham at home to Yorkshire Carnegie on 26 December 2016
(England) Ben West for Yorkshire Carnegie at home to Richmond on 26 March 2017
(England) Ryan Burrows for Yorkshire Carnegie away to Bedford Blues on 8 April 2017
(England) Alex Lewington for London Irish at home to Rotherham Titans on 8 April 2017
(England) Tom Duncan for Cornish Pirates at home to Bedford Blues on 15 April 2017
(England) James Stephenson for Nottingham away to London Scottish on 15 April 2017

Most conversions in a match — 8 (x2)

(England) Tommy Bell for London Irish away to London Scottish on 30 October 2016
(England) Joe Ford for Yorkshire Carnegie at home to Rotherham Titans on 5 February 2017

Most penalties in a match — 7

(Ireland) Peter Lydon for London Scottish at home to Ealing Trailfinders on 2 December 2016

Most drop goals in a match — 1

N/A - multiple players

=== Attendances ===
Highest — 11,671

London Irish at home to Cornish Pirates on 18 March 2017

Lowest — 438

Ealing Trailfinders at home to Jersey Reds on 17 September 2016

Highest Average Attendance — 4,110

London Irish

Lowest Average Attendance — 914

Ealing Trailfinders

== See also ==
- 2016–17 British and Irish Cup
- List of English Rugby Union stadiums by capacity
