= Byron Hodge =

Australian rugby union player (born 1992)

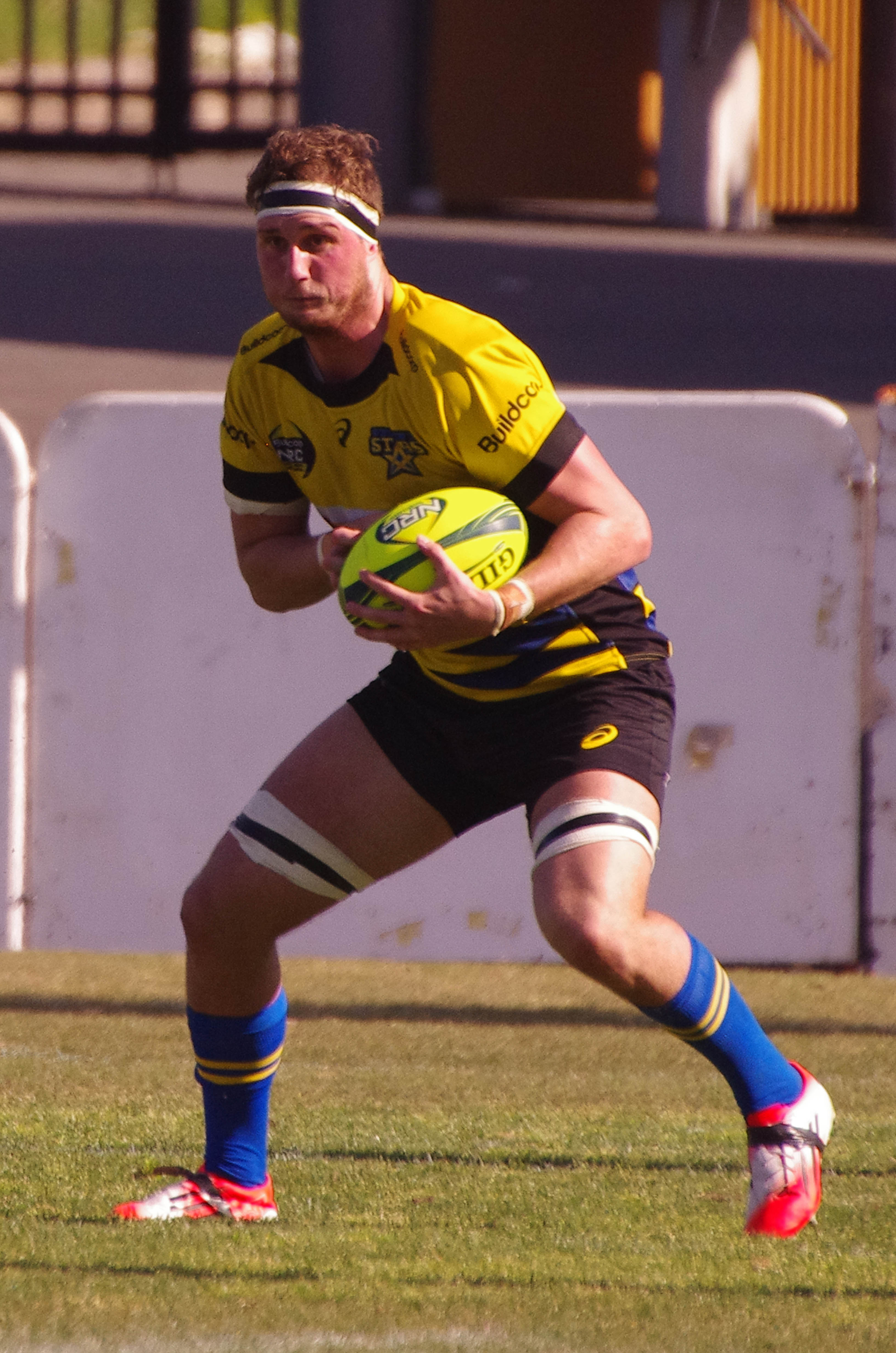
- Born: Byron Hodge; 29 March 1992 (age 34) Sydney, Australia
- Height: 2.00 m (6 ft 7 in)
- Weight: 115 kg (18 st 2 lb)

Rugby union career
- Position: Second Row / Lock
Senior career
Years	Team	Apps	(Points)
–	Saracens		
–	Rotherham Titans		
–	Bedford Blues		
–	Sydney Stars		
–	London Scottish		

Byron Hodge (born 29 March 1992) is a Professional Rugby Union Player currently playing for London Scottish in the Greene King IPA Championship. Previously he has played for the Saracens in the Aviva A League as well as the Rotherham Titans and the Bedford Blues in the Greene King IPA Championship. In 2014 Byron Hodge played for the Sydney Stars in the National Rugby Championship.
