= Ifereimi Boladau =

- Born: Ifereimi Boladau; 21 September 1986 (age 40) Suva, Fiji
- Height: 191 cm (6 ft 3 in)
- Weight: 115 kg (18 st 2 lb)
- School: Suva Grammar School

Rugby union career
- Position(s): Flanker, Number 8
- Current team: Nottingham
Senior career
Years	Team	Apps	(Points)
2014-2016	Ospreys	9	(10)
2016-2017	London Scottish	12	(0)
2017-2018	Rotherham Titans	5	(0)
2019-	Nottingham	1	(0)
2019-2020	→ Leicester Tigers	11	(0)
- Correct as of 29 April 2020
National sevens team
Years	Team		Comps
2010	Fiji 7s		1

Ifereimi Boladau (born 21 September 1986) is a Fijian rugby union player for Nottingham in the RFU Championship. His primary position is flanker or number 8. He has previously played for Ospreys in the Pro14. He has represented the Fiji 7s 7s national team.

== Career ==
In 2010 Boladau made his debut for the Fiji international 7s side at the Murrayfield stop in the 2010 Edinburgh Sevens.

Boladau made his debut for the Ospreys regional team in 2014 having previously played for the Bridgend Ravens. He has also played for the Army Rugby Team in the 2012 Army Navy Match.

On 8 June 2016, London Scottish announced Boladau's signing ahead of the 2016/17 season. After one season with the Exiles Boladau moved north to fellow Championship side Rotherham Titans, the signing being announced on 31 May 2017.

After the 2017/18 season Boladau spent a season outside professional rugby following his career with the British Army. On 19 July 2019 his signing was announced by Nottingham, and on 9 September, prior to his Nottingham debut, a short-term loan move to Leicester Tigers to provide cover during the 2019 Rugby World Cup was announced.
