= Eoin Sheriff =

- Born: Eoin Sheriff; 22 August 1988 (age 38) Gorey, Ireland
- Height: 1.97 m (6 ft 6 in)
- Weight: 115 kg (18 st 2 lb)
- School: Gorey Community School / Blackrock College

Rugby union career
- Position: Lock
Amateur team(s)
Years	Team	Apps	(Points)
- Gorey Rugby Club / Lansdowne FC / Shannon
Senior career
Years	Team	Apps	(Points)
2011–2015	Saracens	30	
2014	→ Bedford	3	(10)
2015–2016	London Irish	15	(0)
- Correct as of 19 December 2020
Provincial / State sides
Years	Team	Apps	(Points)
2008 –2011	Leinster	1	(0)
International career
Years	Team	Apps	(Points)
2008	Ireland U20	9	(0)

Eoin Sheriff (born 22 August 1988) in Gorey, Ireland is a former Irish professional rugby union player. He played at lock for Saracens. Sheriff came through the Leinster Academy system before moving to Saracens in 2011. He retired from the game due to injury at 27 years of age. Sheriff is currently Head Coach of Wanderers F.C. He is also Forwards Coach for the Leinster u18 Clubs and at Presentation College Bray.
