= Kevin Davies (disambiguation) =

Kevin Davies (born 1977) is an English footballer.

Kevin Davies may also refer to:

- Kevin Davies (director) (born 1961), British film and video director
- Kevin Davies (Bahamian footballer) (born 1967), Bahamian football manager
- Kevin Davids (born Kevin Davies), British actor
- Kevin John Davies, Surveyor General of Queensland, Australia, from 1982 to 1990

== See also ==
- Kevin Davis (disambiguation)
