= Tim Molenaar =

- Born: Tim Molenaar; 19 February 1981 (age 45) Masterton, New Zealand
- Height: 1.88 m (6 ft 2 in)
- Weight: 111 kg (17 st 7 lb)

Rugby union career
- Position: Centre
Amateur team(s)
| Years | Team | Apps | (Points) |
- Old Boys University
Senior career
| Years | Team | Apps | (Points) |
| 2004-2009 | Nottingham | 103 | (120) |
| 2009-2013 | Gloucester Rugby | 75 | (50) |
| 2013-2014 | Harlequins | 10 | (0) |
| 2014-2015 | London Welsh | 0 | (0) |
| 2015– | Birmingham Moseley | | |
Provincial / State sides
| Years | Team | Apps | (Points) |
- Wellington

Tim Molenaar (born 19 February 1981 in Masterton, New Zealand) is a rugby union player for Moseley in the RFU Championship. He plays as a centre.

== Career ==
Molenaar signed for Gloucester Rugby from Nottingham in August 2009 after a deal to sign Seru Rabeni fell through.

On 28 October 2013, it was announced that Harlequins have signed Tim Molenaar to a short-term deal following his release from Gloucester Rugby Following his release from Harlequins, Molenaar signed for newly promoted side London Welsh for the 2014–15 season. On 8 June 2015, Molenaar returned to the RFU Championship to sign for Moseley from the 2015–16 season.
