= Michael Holford =

Michael Oliver Holford (born 11 August 1982 in Leicester, Leicestershire, England) is a rugby union player for Nottingham in the Aviva Championship. He previously played for Leicester Tigers, 52 games, (where he also represented England at U19s and U21s) and London Wasps in the Premiership. His usual position is at prop.
