= Rob Langley =

English rugby union footballer

- Born: 18 November 1991 (age 34) Exeter, England
- Height: 1.93 m (6 ft 4 in)
- Weight: 110 kg (17 st 5 lb)

Rugby union career
- Position: Flanker
- Current team: Hartpury College R.F.C.
Senior career
Years	Team	Apps	(Points)
2013-15	Plymouth Albion	55	(30)
2015-17	Nottingham R.F.C.	74	(30)
2017-	Hartpury College R.F.C.	39	(10)

Rob Langley is an English professional rugby union player who played for Gloucester Rugby.
