= Rob O'Donnell =

English rugby union footballer

- Born: Robert O'Donnell; 15 December 1985 (age 40) Liverpool, England
- Height: 1.96 m (6 ft 5 in)
- Weight: 125 kg (276 lb; 19 st 10 lb)

Rugby union career
- Position(s): Prop, Lock
Senior career
Years	Team	Apps	(Points)
2004–08	Waterloo	66	(25)
2006–10	Sale Sharks	35	(10)
2010–12	Rotherham Titans	28	(15)
2012–15	Worcester Warriors	35	
2015-	Yorkshire Carnegie		
International career
Years	Team	Apps	(Points)
- Lancashire
–	England Counties		

Rob O'Donnell (born 15 December 1985) is an English rugby union player from Liverpool currently playing for Yorkshire Carnegie in the RFU Championship.

O’Donnell joined Yorkshire Carnegie from Worcester Warriors on a two-year contract and became Head Coach Bryan Redpath's ninth signing for the new RFU Championship season.

He had previously joined Worcester Warriors from Rotherham Titans in 2012 and the Liverpool-born prop has also had playing spells at Sale Sharks and Waterloo. He stands at 6 ft 5in and weighs over 19 stone and can operate on both sides of the scrum. Rob also had a brief rugby coaching career at Rydal Penrhos in North Wales.
