= James Tincknell =

James Tincknell (born 13 August 1988 in Leicester) is an English rugby union player who currently plays at centre/wing for Coventry.

He suffered a serious car accident when travelling back to Leeds. He was in a coma for almost a month before making a recovery. He won the 2011 Blyth Spirit Award, from the Rugby Players' Association.

He'd joined Leeds the previous year from Wharfedale where he'd made his mark scoring 15 tries during the 2009/10 season. It was on the back of those performances that he was selected to play for England Counties.

To aid his recovery following his accident, Tincknell had a loan spell at Wharfedale at the end of 2011/12 season before joining Doncaster Knights in October 2012. He was signed to a short-term contract with Cornish Pirates for the 2013/14 season. After his release, he was snapped up by London Welsh. At the beginning of the 2015/16 season James signed for Coventry.
