= Rhys Crane =

English rugby union player

- Born: Rhys Crane; 14 October 1985 (age 41) Wolverhampton, England
- Height: 1.85 m (6 ft 1 in)
- Weight: 95 kg (14 st 13 lb)

Rugby union career
- Position: Wing
- Current team: London Welsh
Senior career
| Years | Team | Apps | (Points) |
| | Bath Rugby | 4 | (0) |
| | Sale Sharks | 6 | (15) |
| 2011–2013 | Nottingham | | |
| 2013- | London Welsh | | |

Rhys Crane (born 14 October 1985 in Wolverhampton) is a former rugby union player for London Welsh, who plays at wing. He joined Bath after completing a degree in Sports and Exercise Science at Cardiff University.

Crane made quite an impression during Bath's pre-season friendly against Ulster in August 2008 by scoring three tries and he went on to save the EDF Energy Cup game against Sale Sharks in October 2008 with a last-ditch tackle in the corner that prevented the Sharks from scoring a winning try.

On 31 May 2013, Crane signed for London Welsh in the RFU Championship for 2013/14 season.

Following London Welsh's administration, Crane became the Director of Rugby at Tonbridge School, where he still works.
