= Darryl Marfo =

Scotland international rugby union player

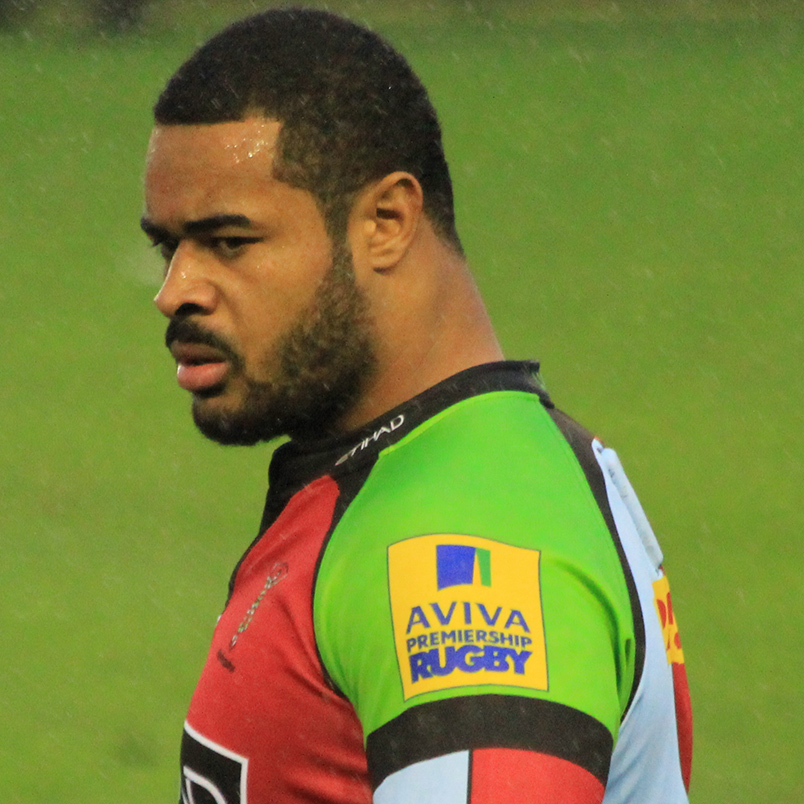
- Marfo playing for Harlequins in 2013
- Born: Darryl Yaw A. Marfo; 1 November 1990 (age 36) Westminster, London, England
- Height: 1.85 m (6 ft 1 in)
- Weight: 112 kg (17 st 9 lb; 247 lb)
- School: London Nautical School

Rugby union career
- Position: Prop
Senior career
Years	Team	Apps	(Points)
2009–2011	→ Richmond (loan)	13	(20)
2011–2015	Harlequins	32	(0)
2011–2012	→ Rosslyn Park (loan)	13	(0)
2013	→ London Scottish (loan)	1	(0)
2013–2014	→ Ealing Trailfinders (loan)	6	(0)
2015–2016	London Welsh	32	(5)
2017	Bath	4	(0)
2017–2019	Edinburgh	12	(0)
2020	Ospreys	3	(0)
2021	Leicester Tigers	0	(0)
2021	→ Nottingham R.F.C. (loan)	1	(0)
- Correct as of 9 March 2021
International career
Years	Team	Apps	(Points)
2017	Scotland	3	(0)
- Correct as of 26 October 2019

Darryl Yaw A. Marfo (born 1 November 1990) is a Scottish international rugby player. He has previously played for Harlequins, Bath and Leicester Tigers in Premiership Rugby, London Scottish, London Welsh and Ealing Trailfinders in the RFU Championship and Edinburgh in the Pro14. On 11 November 2017 he made his Scotland debut against Samoa, and has gained three caps.

== Early life ==
Marfo was born in Westminster, London, to a Scottish mother. He grew up in Pimlico Marfo regularly visited his mother's family in Ayr.

A family friend introduced Marfo to rugby at Battersea Ironsides.

== Club career ==
Marfo joined Harlequins academy as a 14yr-old, making his debut at 20 years old in September 2011 against Gloucester. He left Harlequins at the end of the 2014-15 season, to join London Welsh. When London Welsh were liquidated in December 2016 Marfo was worried that he would not be able to find a professional rugby contract, however quickly joined Bath on a short-term contract in January 2017. In the summer of 2017, Marfo signed a one-year contract with Edinburgh. He left the club in December 2019. He signed a short-term deal with Leicester Tigers in March 2021, but was released on 16 June 2021 without playing a game.

== International career ==
Marfo received his first call up to the senior Scotland squad by coach Gregor Townsend in October 2017 for the Autumn Internationals. He is eligible for Scotland through his Scottish born mother. He made his international debut on 11 November 2017 against Samoa, and also started against New Zealand and in Scotland's record win against Australia.
