= Seb Stegmann =

English rugby union player

Sebastian Stegmann
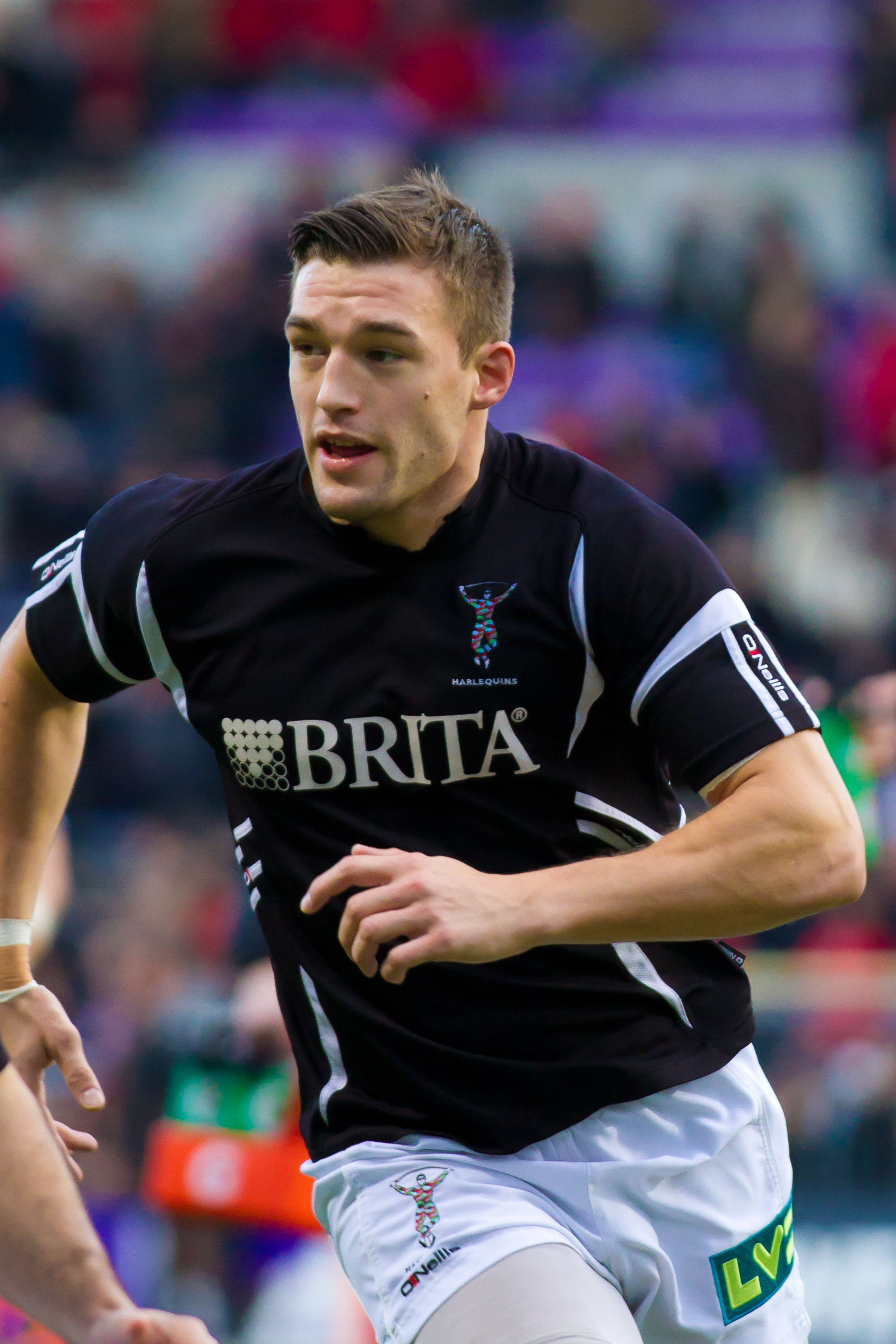
- Born: 12 April 1989 (age 37) Isleworth, London, England
- Height: 1.85 m (6 ft 1 in)
- Weight: 91 kg (14 st 5 lb)
- School: Heathside School; Cranleigh School

Rugby union career
- Position: Wing
Senior career
| Years | Team | Apps | (Points) |
| 2007–2013 | Harlequins | 35 | (55) |
| 2013–2015 | London Welsh | 6 | (10) |
| 2015–2017 | Yorkshire Carnegie | 0 | (0) |
| 2017– | Ealing Trailfinders | 0 | (0) |

Sebastian Stegmann (born 12 April 1989 in Isleworth) is a rugby union player for Ealing Trailfinders in the RFU Championship. He plays as a wing.

He attended Cranleigh School as a youngster and during his time in Harlequins academy, he spent several games playing for Esher RFC.

Stegmann scored his first try for Quins 1st XV on 22 March 2009 against Sale Sharks.

On 25 February 2013, Sebastian Stegmann would leave Harlequins to join London Welsh on a two-year contract for the 2013/14 season.

On 10 April 2015, Stegmann signs for Yorkshire Carnegie on a two-year deal in the RFU Championship from the 2015–16 season. On 25 May 2017, Stegmann signed for Championship rivals Ealing Trailfinders from the 2017–18 season.
