= Will Carrick-Smith =

English rugby union player (born 1992)

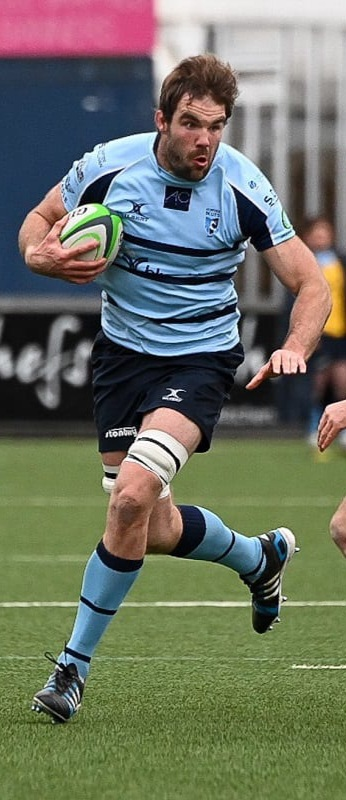
- Carrick-Smith in 2021
- Born: 2 April 1992 (age 34) Wandsworth, England
- Height: 2.11 m (6 ft 11 in)
- Weight: 129 kg (284 lb; 20 st 4 lb)
- School: Blundell's School
- Occupation: Professional rugby union player

Rugby union career
- Position: Lock
Senior career
Years	Team	Apps	(Points)
2010-2015	Exeter Chiefs	11	(10)
2012	→ Randwick	3	(0)
2014-15	→ Cornish Pirates	17	(0)
2015-2016	London Scottish	22	(0)
2016-	Bedford Blues	44	(15)

Will Carrick-Smith, nicknamed The Tree, (born 2 April 1992) is a rugby union player for Exeter Chiefs in the Aviva Premiership. He made his debut for the club against London Welsh on 11 November 2012. At 6 ft 11, Carrick-Smith is the tallest professional player currently to be contracted to an English Premiership side. However, the tallest player ever to be contracted to an English Premiership side is Richard Metcalfe, formerly of Newcastle Falcons and Northampton Saints.

At the end of the 2012/13 season, Carrick-Smith went out to Australia on loan for the summer with Randwick.

On 25 August 2015, Carrick-Smith signed a permanent deal to join RFU Championship club London Scottish from the 2015–16 season, effectively leaving Exeter. On 17 March 2016, Carrick-Smith signed for Championship rivals Bedford Blues from the 2016–17 season onwards.
