= Carl Kirwan =

English rugby union player

- Born: Carl Kirwan; 21 March 1991 (age 35) Durham, England
- Height: 1.91 m (6 ft 3 in)
- Weight: 110 kg (17 st 5 lb; 243 lb)

Rugby union career
- Position: Flanker
- Current team: Nottingham
Amateur team(s)
Years	Team	Apps	(Points)
–	Middlesbrough RUFC		
–	Newcastle Falcons Academy		
Senior career
Years	Team	Apps	(Points)
2011–2013	Rotherham Titans	0	(0)
2013–2015	London Welsh	46	(40)
2015–2019	Worcester Warriors	52	(10)
2019–2020	Chinnor		
2020–	Nottingham		
- Correct as of 1 July 2017

Carl Kirwan (born 21 March 1991) is an English rugby union player who plays for Nottingham in the RFU Championship.

Kirwan came through the Newcastle Falcons academy, previously spent two years at Rotherham Titans following a spell with hometown club Middlesbrough.

Kirwan made a significant impact during his campaigns at London Welsh previously captained the side, scoring eight tries in 24 Championship appearances and helped the club beat Bristol to win promotion to the Aviva Premiership, and was subsequently named Supporters Club Player of the Year.

On 16 June 2015, Kirwan left London Welsh to sign for Worcester Warriors in the Aviva Premiership from the 2015-16 season.

After a season at National League 1 side Chinnor he was signed by Nottingham in the RFU Championship where he will combine his rugby career with a career in construction.
