= Tom Casson =

English rugby union footballer

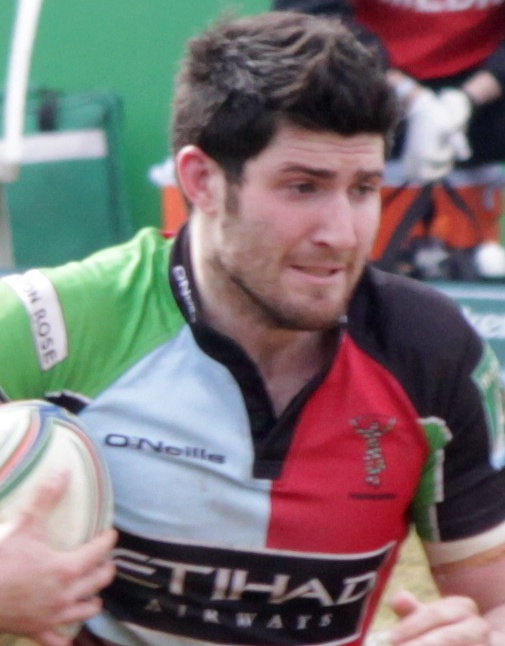
- Casson on attack for Harlequin against Munster in 2013
- Born: Thomas Casson; 6 April 1990 (age 36) Manchester, England
- Height: 1.83 m (6 ft 0 in)
- Weight: 90 kg (14 st 2 lb)
- School: Sedbergh School

Rugby union career
- Position: Centre
- Current team: Wetherby RUFC
Youth career
- 2006-2008: Sale Sharks
Senior career
| Years | Team | Apps | (Points) |
| 2008-2010 | Saracens | | |
| 2010-2015 | Harlequins | 62 | (30) |
| 2015- | Yorkshire Carnegie | 0 | (0) |
International career
| Years | Team | Apps | (Points) |
| 2006-2007 | England U18 | | |
| 2009-2010 | England U20 | | |

Tom Casson (born 6 April 1990) is a rugby union player for Yorkshire Carnegie in the RFU Championship. He is a Centre, usually playing at 12.

== Career ==
Casson started out in the Sale Sharks junior Academy, making age-group representation for England at under-16s and 18s, in 2008 he moved to Saracens. Tom had limited opportunities at Saracens and was dual registered to Bedford and then Nottingham, but consistently featured in Mark Mapletoft's England under-20 team. In February 2010 Casson joined Harlequins with immediate effect, this mid-season transfer provided cover for Quins' injured centres but was also a long term (2 ½ year) contract.

Casson made his competitive debut for Quins with a start against Bayonne in the Amlin Cup on 10 August 2010. He scored his first senior try for the club in the same competition against Prato. Following an injury to Jordan Turner-Hall, Casson made his Heineken Cup debut in Quins' away victory against French giants Toulouse.
