= Tom Heard =

English rugby union player

- Born: 24 August 1993 (age 33) Taunton, England
- Height: 183 cm (6 ft 0 in)
- Weight: 130 kg (20 st 7 lb)
- Notable relative: Darren Crompton

Rugby union career
- Position: Prop
- Current team: Plymouth Albion
Senior career
Years	Team	Apps	(Points)
- Gloucester Rugby
2014–2015	Plymouth Albion		
2015–2017	Nottingham		
2017–	Hartpury RFC		

Tom Heard (born 24 August 1993) is an English professional rugby union player who plays for Plymouth Albion. A product of Gloucester academy. He signed his first professional contract with Plymouth Albion who play in the RFU Championship. On 4 November 2015, Heard signed for Championship rivals Nottingham from the 2015–16 season. On 13 June 2017, Heard returns to home club in Gloucestershire Hartpury RFC from the 2017–18 season.
