= Ben Morris (rugby union) =

English rugby union player

- Born: Benjamin Mark Morris; 13 December 1991 (age 34) Lancaster, England
- Height: 1.88 m (6 ft 2 in)
- Weight: 109 kg (17 st 2 lb)

Rugby union career
- Position: Flanker
Senior career
Years	Team	Apps	(Points)
2018–2022	Wasps		
- Correct as of 17 October 2022
- Correct as of 28 December 2020

Ben Morris (born 13 December 1991) is an English rugby union player. His playing position is Flanker. His current club is Birmingham Moseley Rugby Club
