= Will Skuse =

English rugby union player

- Born: Will Skuse; 14 February 1992 (age 34) Truro, England
- Height: 1.90 m (6 ft 3 in)
- Weight: 109 kg (240 lb; 17 st 2 lb)
- School: Penair School; Bryanston School
- University: University of Bath

Rugby union career
- Position: Flanker
Amateur team(s)
Years	Team	Apps	(Points)
- Truro RFC
Senior career
Years	Team	Apps	(Points)
2010-	Bath	23	(5)
2013-2014	→ Nottingham	9	(5)
International career
Years	Team	Apps	(Points)
2012	England U20	3	(0)

Will Skuse (born 14 February 1992 in Truro, England) is an English professional rugby union footballer. He plays at flanker for Bath.
