= Andy Forsyth =

English rugby union player

Andrew Forsyth
- Born: Andrew Forsyth; 9 September 1990 (age 36) Clayton West, Yorkshire, England
- Height: 1.88 m (6 ft 2 in)
- Weight: 97 kg (15 st 4 lb)
- School: QEGS Wakefield

Rugby union career
- Position: Centre/Fullback
- Current team: Coventry
Senior career
Years	Team	Apps	(Points)
2009–2013	Leicester Tigers	24	(10)
2010–2013	Nottingham	29	(40)
2013–2015	Sale Sharks	23	(17)
2015–2019	Yorkshire Carnegie	4	(10)
2019	Leicester Tigers (loan)	10	(10)
2019-	Coventry	0	(0)
- Correct as of 27 September 2015
International career
Years	Team	Apps	(Points)
2006–2007	England U18		
2009–2010	England U20		

Andrew Forsyth (born 9 September 1990) is a retired English rugby union footballer, from Clayton West, Huddersfield, United Kingdom.

== Education and career ==
He attended Queen Elizabeth Grammar School, Wakefield. He plays as both a centre and fullback. He has represented England at Under-16, Under-18 and Under-20 levels and played for Leicester Tigers as part of their rugby academy squad. He is one of the brightest young rugby talents in the United Kingdom, despite being diabetic.

Forsyth made his first team debut for the Tigers from the bench against Northampton Saints in October 2009. He started at centre in the game against South Africa in November 2009.

After stints at Sale and Yorkshire Carnegie, Forsyth signed for Coventry. The Championship club confirmed he would be loaned to Leicester as cover during the 2019 Rugby World Cup.
