= Owen Evans (rugby union) =

Welsh rugby union footballer

- Born: Owen Evans; 19 February 1989 (age 37) Cardigan, Wales
- Height: 188 cm (6 ft 2 in)
- Weight: 121 kg (19 st 1 lb)

Rugby union career
- Current team: Doncaster Knights
Senior career
Years	Team	Apps	(Points)
2010-2012	Scarlets	1	(0)
2012-2015	Newport Gwent Dragons	62	(15)
2015-2017	Harlequins	15	(0)
2017–	Doncaster Knights		
- Correct as of 23 February 2014
International career
Years	Team	Apps	(Points)
- Wales U20

Owen Evans (born 19 February 1989) is a Welsh rugby union player who plays as a prop forward. Evans is a Wales Under-20 international. He is the son of former Llanelli and Welsh international prop forward Ricky Evans.

Evans played for Llandovery RFC and the Scarlets.

In September 2012 Evans signed for Newport Gwent Dragons. He joined Harlequins for the 2015–16 season.

On 15 June 2017, Evans signed for RFU Championship club Doncaster Knights ahead of the 2017–18 season.
