= Kevin Davis (rugby union) =

English rugby player

- Born: Kevin Davis; 26 January 1986 (age 40) Bristol, England
- Height: 1.84 m (6 ft 1/2 in)
- Weight: 110 kg (17 st 5 lb)
- University: University of Oxford; Loughborough University

Rugby union career
- Position: Prop
Super Rugby
| Years | Team | Apps | (Points) |
| 2012–2013 | Queensland Reds | | |
| 2013–2014 | London Welsh | | |
| 2014– | Ealing Trailfinders | | |

Kevin Davis (born 26 January 1986) is a rugby union footballer who plays as a prop. Davis was named in the Queensland Reds Extended Playing Squad for the 2012 Super Rugby season, however he did not make any appearances for the first-team. His performances for his local club, University ensured he retained his spot in the Reds EPS for the 2013 season. In July 2013, it was announced that he joined London Welsh in the RFU Championship. On 21 May 2014, Davis signed for Ealing Trailfinders, who compete in National League 1, the third tier of domestic rugby in England. Ealing later confirmed that Davis will be moving on and therefore not renewing his contract for season 2015/16.
