= Tom Lindsay (rugby union) =

English rugby union footballer

- Born: Tom Lindsay; 18 November 1987 (age 39) Swindon, England
- Height: 1.88 m (6 ft 2 in)
- Weight: 110 kg (17 st 5 lb; 243 lb)

Rugby union career
- Position: Hooker
- Current team: Bristol Bears
Youth career
- Saracens Academy
Senior career
Years	Team	Apps	(Points)
2004–2015	Wasps	129	(25)
2015–2017	Gloucester	12	(0)
2017	Saracens	2	(0)
2017–2018	Bedford Blues	24	(5)
2018–2020	Bristol Bears	9	(10)
International career
Years	Team	Apps	(Points)
2010	England Saxons		

Tom Lindsay (born 18 November 1987) is an English former professional rugby union player who recently played for Bristol Bears in Premiership Rugby.

A former member of the Saracens Academy, Lindsay made his senior debut for Wasps in 2008 and his first senior start came in the 2009–10 Amlin Challenge Cup pool game against Racing Metro. The young hooker produced some excellent form towards the end of that season which earned him selection for England Saxons in the 2010 Churchill Cup.

After 11-year association with Wasps, on 13 March 2015, Lindsay has signed for Gloucester Rugby from the 2015–16 season.

On 16 February 2017, Lindsay left Gloucester by mutual consent to join old club Saracens on a short-term deal as injury cover.

On 10 May 2017, Lindsay signed a permanent deal to join Bedford Blues in the RFU Championship ahead of the 2017–18 season. On 9 March 2018, Lindsay signs for Bristol from the 2018–19 season. He later confirmed his retirement at the end of the 2019–20 season.
