= Tom Hicks (rugby union) =

English rugby union player (born 1991)

- Born: 25 October 1991 (age 35) Rhineland, Germany
- Height: 2.03 m (6 ft 8 in)
- Weight: 119 kg (18 st 10 lb)

Rugby union career
- Position: Lock
- Current team: Doncaster Knights R.F.C
Senior career
Years	Team	Apps	(Points)
2010-2013	Northampton Saints		
2013–2016	Gloucester Rugby	16	(0)
2014–2015	Plymouth Rugby (Loan)	12	(5)
2016−2017	Rotherham Titans	20	(10)
2017-2021	Doncaster Knights	31	

Tom Hicks (born 25 October 1991) is an English professional rugby union player who plays for Doncaster Knights in the RFU Championship.

Originally part of the Northampton Saints academy, Hicks signed for Gloucester Rugby on 7 June 2013. On 24 April 2015, Hicks officially signed a senior deal with Gloucester. On 8 May 2016, Hicks joins RFU Championship side Rotherham Titans from the 2016–17 season. On 11 April 2017, Hicks signed for Championship rivals Doncaster Knights ahead of the 2017–18 season.
