= Martyn Thomas (rugby union) =

Welsh rugby player (born 1987)

- Born: 24 April 1987 (age 39) Carmarthen, Wales
- Height: 180 cm (5 ft 11 in)
- Weight: 95 kg (14 st 13 lb)

Rugby union career
- Position: Full Back
Senior career
| Years | Team | Apps | (Points) |
| 2006–2012 | Newport Gwent Dragons | 83 | (70) |
| 2012–2014 | Gloucester Rugby | 39 | (25) |
| 2015 | Coventry | 4 | (0) |
| 2015 | Wasps | | |
| 2015-16 | London Welsh | | |
| 2017 | Merthyr RFC | | |
Coaching career
- Years: Team
- 2023 -: Chestertons Rugby Team

Martyn Thomas (born 24 April 1987) is a Welsh rugby union player. He plays in the full back position.

He went to UWIC from 2005 to 2008. He studied Sports Development during this period before joining the Scarlets regional team and subsequently Newport Gwent Dragons.

Thomas signed an extended contract with Newport Gwent Dragons in January 2010.

Thomas joined Gloucester Rugby on a one-year contract, option for a further season, starting at the 2012/13 season.

Following a stint in France, Thomas signed for Coventry. He made his debut on the bench for Coventry's game against Richmond on 31 January as they look to attain promotion back into the RFU Championship.

On 27 February 2015, Thomas made his return to the Aviva Premiership as he signed for Wasps until the end of the 2014–15 season.

On 24 April 2015, Thomas signed a permanent deal with London Welsh in the RFU Championship from the 2015–16 season.
