= Seán McCarthy (rugby union, born 1990) =

Sean McCarthy
- Born: Sean McCarthy; 12 December 1990 (age 35) Dudley, England
- Height: 1.85 m (6 ft 1 in)
- Weight: 112 kg (17 st 9 lb)

Rugby union career
- Position: Prop
- Current team: Bedford Blues
Amateur team(s)
Years	Team	Apps	(Points)
- Pertemps Bees
Senior career
Years	Team	Apps	(Points)
2009-10	Nuneaton	7	(0)
2010-2011	Worcester Warriors	0	(0)
2010-2011	→Stourbridge	1	(0)
2011	→Rugby Lions	11	(0)
2011-2012	Birmingham Solihull	13	(0)
2012-2014	Jersey		
2014-2015	Leinster	0	(0)
2015-2017	Jersey Reds	0	(0)
2017–	Bedford Blues	0	
International career
Years	Team	Apps	(Points)
- Ireland U18

Sean McCarthy (born 12 December 1990) is a rugby union player for Bedford Blues. His preferred position is loosehead prop. He represented Ireland at under 18 level and previously played for Worcester Warriors.

In May 2014 it was announced that he would join Leinster for the 2014-15 season. On 15 March 2015, McCarthy resigned with Jersey Reds from the 2016-17 season. On 10 March 2017, McCarthy signs for Championship rivals Bedford Blues ahead of the 2017-18 season.
