= Dean Schofield =

England international rugby union player

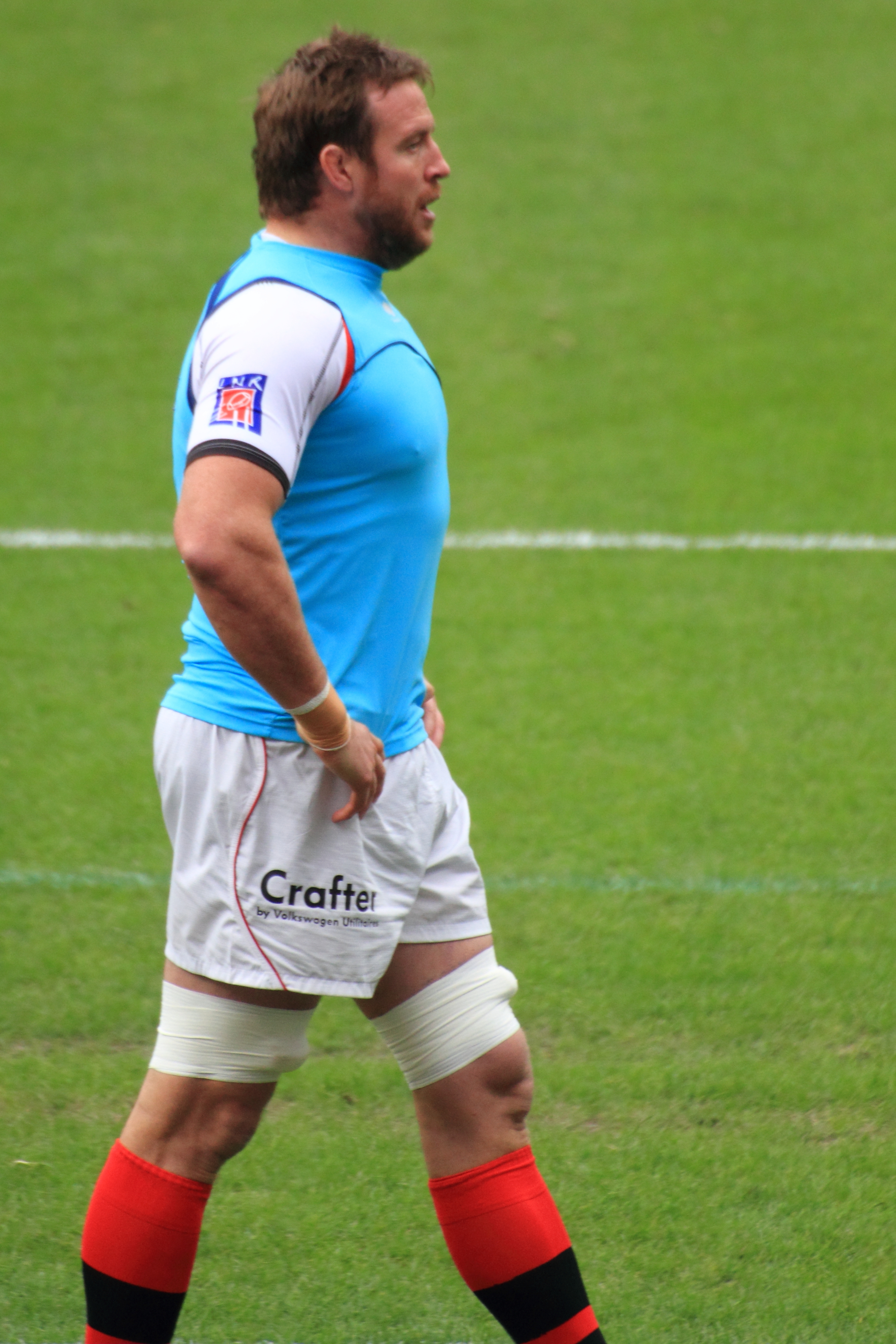
- Born: Dean Schofield; 19 January 1979 (age 47) Clayton, Manchester, England
- Height: 6 ft 6 in (1.98 m)
- Weight: 20 st 2 lb (128 kg)

Rugby union career
- Position: Lock
- Current team: Stockport Rugby Club 3XV
Youth career
- Aldwinians RUFC
Senior career
Years	Team	Apps	(Points)
2001–2002	Wakefield RFC		
2001–2010	Sale Sharks		
2010-2012	Toulon		
2012-2014	Worcester Warriors		
2014-2015	London Welsh		
2015-	Yorkshire Carnegie		
International career
Years	Team	Apps	(Points)
2006	England Saxons		
2007	England	2	(0)

Dean Schofield (born 19 January 1979 in Clayton, Manchester, England) is a former professional rugby player who played for London Welsh, among other clubs. He plays lock and is a product of Aldwinians RUFC. He first came to prominence when scoring twice as Aldwinians beat Dudley Kingswinsford in the NPI Cup Final at Twickenham. He also played for Wakefield during their time in National Division One.

Schofield made his England debut in a defeat to South Africa, during a summer tour prior to the 2007 Rugby World Cup.

He was named in the England squad to participate in the 2009 Churchill Cup, coming off the bench in the Final.

In the 2005–2006 season, Schofield played as a replacement in the final as Sale Sharks won their first ever Premiership title. After having played for Sale Sharks since 2001, Schofield was named their captain for the 2009-10 Guinness Premiership season. However, that season being the last in his contract, he chose to leave Sale at the end of the season. On 1 February 2010, he announced that he had signed a two-year deal with Top 14 club Toulon, effective from the 2010–11 Top 14 season.

In April 2012, it was announced that Schofield will be joining Worcester Warriors at the start of the 2012–13 season. He was the club captain of Worcester Warriors. On 27 June 2014, Schofield signed for London Welsh who returned to the Aviva Premiership for the 12–15 season.

For 2014/15 season, Schofield signed for Yorkshire Carnegie in the Greene King IPA Championship.

== Personal life ==
Schofield lives with his partner Gemma and her son. Gemma is a successful property developer from Cheshire and runs her own company, GB Homes.
