= Andy Saull =

English rugby union player

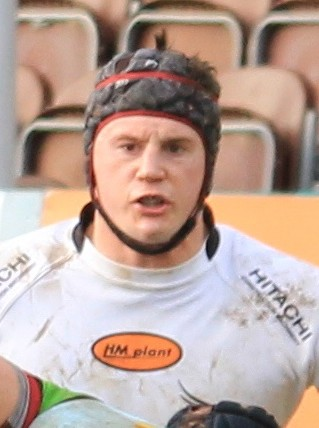
- Born: Andrew Saull; 27 September 1988 (age 38) London
- Height: 1.86 m (6 ft 1 in)
- Weight: 103 kg (16 st 3 lb)
- School: Bancroft's School
- University: Birkbeck, University of London; Kellogg College, Oxford

Rugby union career
- Position: Flanker
- Current team: Yorkshire Carnegie
Youth career
- Woodford RFC
Senior career
Years	Team	Apps	(Points)
2007–2013	Saracens	108	(50)
2013–2015	Newcastle Falcons	20	(25)
2015–2017	Yorkshire Carnegie		
International career
Years	Team	Apps	(Points)
2003-2004	England U16		
2006-2007	England U18		
2008-2009	England U20		
2009	England Saxons		

Andy Saull (born 27 September 1988 in London) is a rugby union player who plays at flanker and was part of the Saracens team who won the English premiership in 2011. Saull also represented Oxford University in The Varsity Match against Cambridge University.

== Early life ==
He was educated at Bancroft's School, Birkbeck, University of London and Kellogg College, Oxford. His formative years were spent playing for Woodford R.F.C. in Redbridge.

== Club career ==
Saull made his debut for Saracens in an EDF Energy Cup match against Bristol. He made his first Premiership start on 12 September 2008 against Sale Sharks.

He made his full debut for Saracens in 2007–08 season against Bristol in the EDF Energy Cup. A regular in the team in the 2010/11 title winning season, he was a replacement as Saracens won their first Premiership. However a leg injury prevented him from joining up with England Saxons that summer. Saull made his 100th appearance for Saracens on 27 December 2011, after replacing the injured Jacques Burger in the squad.

On 18 April 2013, Newcastle Falcons signed Saull to a two-year contract from the 2013–14 season. On 17 April 2015, Saull signs for Yorkshire Carnegie, competing in the RFU Championship on a two-year contract from the 2015–16 season. On 13 June 2017, Saull announced his retirement from professional rugby.

== International career ==
Saull was a member of the grand slam winning England Under 20 team in 2008, although he missed much of the season with a broken leg.

Saull made his England Saxons debut against Portugal in January 2009, winning the Churchill Cup with England Saxons in 2010.

== Post career ==
Saull now researches real estate at Oxford University as part of the Future of Real Estate Initiative after undertaking a Masters in Sustainable Urban Development.

== Publications ==
Saull, A., and Baum, A. 2019. The Future of Real Estate Transactions. Saïd Business School.

Baum, A., Saull. A., Braesemann, F. 2020. PropTech 2020: the future of real estate. Saïd Business School.
