= Jason Harries =

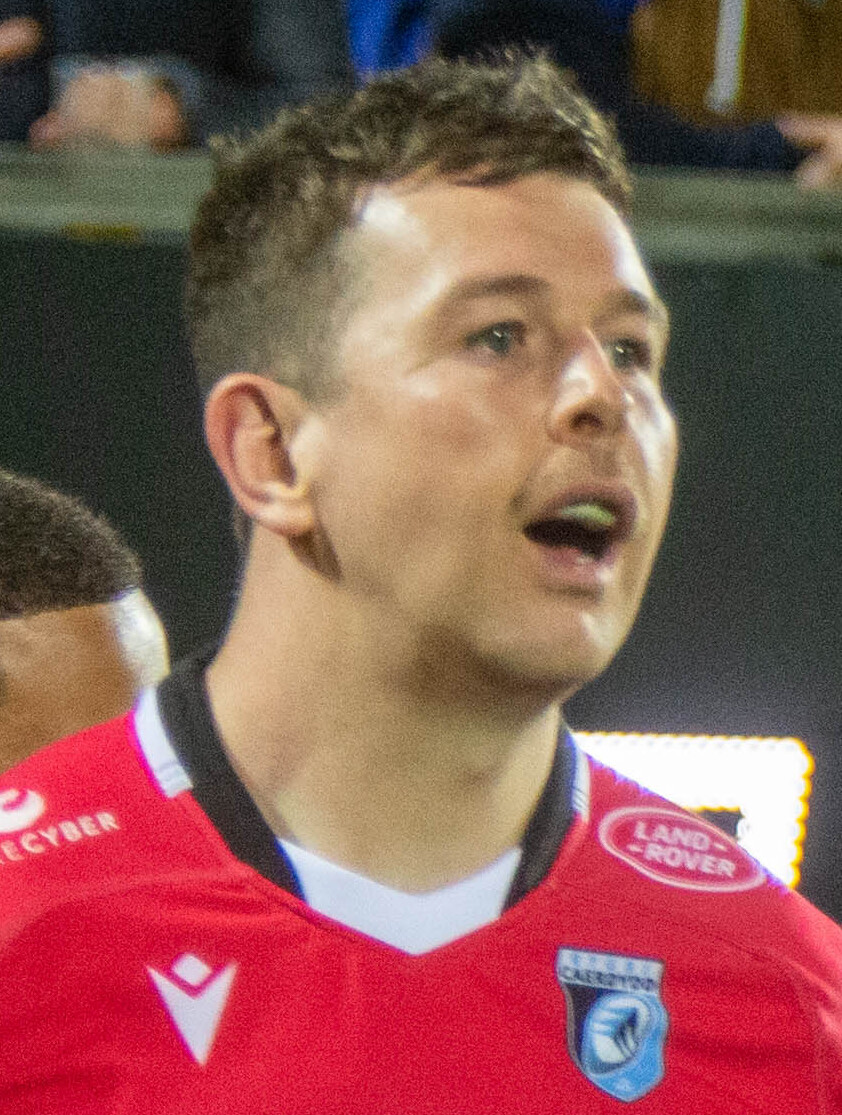
- Born: Jason Harries; 14 February 1989 (age 37) Wales
- Height: 193 cm (6 ft 4 in)
- Weight: 98 kg (15 st 6 lb)

Rugby union career
- Current team: Cardiff Rugby
Senior career
Years	Team	Apps	(Points)
2015–2017	London Scottish	46	(109)
2017–2018	Edinburgh	10	(10)
2018–	Cardiff Rugby	44	(55)
- Correct as of 08 June 2022
International career
Years	Team	Apps	(Points)
2008–2009	Wales U20	5	(5)
National sevens team
Years	Team		Comps
2012–2015, 2018–	Wales 7s		

Jason Harries (born 14 February 1989) is a Welsh professional rugby union player who played for Cardiff Rugby as a wing or centre before announcing his retirement. On the field, He was a Wales under-20 and Wales Sevens international.

Harries joined Cardiff in 2018 having previously played for the London Scottish and Edinburgh since returning to the 15-a-side game in 2015.
