= Richard Lane (rugby union) =

English rugby union player

- Born: Richard Lane; 21 July 1993 (age 33) Bedford, England
- Height: 1.80 m (5 ft 11 in)
- Weight: 87 kg (192 lb; 13 st 10 lb)
- School: Millfield School

Rugby union career
- Position(s): Wing, Fullback
Senior career
| Years | Team | Apps | (Points) |
| 2011–2015 | Bath | 12 | (25) |
| 2014 | Cornish Pirates (D/R) | 2 | (10) |
| 2015–2017 | Jersey Reds | 0 | (0) |
| 2017–2022 | Bedford Blues | | |
| 2022– | Bristol Bears | | |
- Correct as of 7 February 2015

Richard Lane (born 21 July 1993) is an English professional rugby union player. He plays at wing and fullback for Bristol Bears in Premiership Rugby. In 2019 he was named as the Bedford Blues' "Players' Player" of the year. He has dual-registration with Cornish Pirates.

On 2 July 2015, Lane signed his first professional contract with Jersey Reds in the RFU Championship.
