= Chris York =

English rugby union player (born 1989)

- Born: Chris York; 27 December 1989 (age 36) Epsom, Surrey, England
- Height: 1.93 m (6 ft 4 in)
- Weight: 104 kg (16 st 5 lb)
- School: Epsom College

Rugby union career
- Position(s): Number Eight, Flanker
- Current team: Newcastle Falcons
Youth career
- Sutton & Epsom RFC
Senior career
Years	Team	Apps	(Points)
2008–2012	Harlequins		
2008–2009	Blackheath (loan)		
2012–	Newcastle Falcons		

Chris York (born 27 December 1989) is an English rugby union free agent. He is currently turning out as an inspirational Number 8 for Wimbledon RFC.

He was discovered by Quins through the EPDG system, and was offered a full Academy contract in 2007. He has since worn the Quins shirt on numerous occasions, making his A league debut against Bristol last season, and his full XV debut in the pre-season friendly against Connacht Rugby in August 2008. He spent the 2008–09 season on loan at Blackheath F.C.

York's current position is no. 8, he can also play at flanker.

York represented the England Under 20 team at the 2009 IRB Junior World Championship.

On 4 June 2013, York signed for Newcastle Falcons in the Aviva Premiership from the 2013–14 season.
