= James Stephenson (rugby union) =

English rugby union player

James Stephenson (born 20 February 1990 (age 36)) is an English rugby union player for Worcester Warriors. He previously played for Bedford Blues and Blackheath.

He plays as a wing or centre.

In April 2013, Stephenson signed a three-year contract with Worcester.
