= List of 2023–24 Premiership Rugby transfers =

This is a list of player transfers involving Premiership Rugby teams before or during the 2023–24 season.

The list consists of deals that have been confirmed, and are for players who are moving either from or to a rugby union team which competed in the Premiership during the 2022–23 season. It is not unknown for confirmed deals to be cancelled at a later date.

Transfers involving Wasps and Worcester Warriors are not included on this list, following the suspension of both clubs partway through the 2022–23 season due to financial insolvency, and their subsequent relegation to the bottom of the league pyramid for the 2023–24 season, after their appeals were rejected by the RFU.

Transfers involving London Irish, which finished the 2022–23 season, are documented on this list, although the club will not compete in 2023–24, due to its suspension and relegation prior to the season's start, having failed to provide evidence of sufficient funds.

== Bath ==
=== Players In ===
- (Scotland) Finn Russell from (France) Racing 92
- (South Africa) Thomas du Toit from (South Africa) Sharks
- (England) Mikey Summerfield from (England) London Irish
- (England) Elliott Stooke from (France) Montpellier
- (South Africa) Brendan Owen from Jersey Reds (short-term deal)
- (Italy) Hame Faiva from (New Zealand) Hurricanes
- (South Africa) Jacques du Plessis from (South Africa) Bulls
- (Wales) Regan Grace from (France) Racing 92
- (South Africa) Neil le Roux from (South Africa) Blue Bulls

=== Players Out ===
- (England) Richard de Carpentier retired
- (England) Frankie Read released
- (England) Dave Attwood retired
- (South Africa) Wesley White released
- (South Africa) Jordan Venter to (England) Bedford Blues
- (England) Jonathan Joseph to (France) Biarritz
- (England) Billy Searle to (France) Toulouse
- (Scotland) D'Arcy Rae to (France) Montpellier
- (England) Tom Doughty to (England) Doncaster Knights
- (England) Darren Atkins to (France) Orléans
- (England) Gabriel Hamer-Webb to (New Zealand) Southland
- (England) Will Spencer to (France) Soyaux Angoulême
- (England) Max Green to (England) Harlequins
- (Australia) Fergus Lee-Warner to (Australia) NSW Waratahs
- (England) Piers Francis to (Japan) Kurita Water Gush
- (Russia) Valery Morozov to (Russia) Krasny Yar Krasnoyarsk

== Bristol Bears ==
=== Players In ===
- (England) Max Malins from (England) Saracens
- (Fiji) Kalaveti Ravouvou from (Fiji) Fijian Drua
- (Ireland) Kieran Marmion from (Ireland) Connacht
- (England) Gabriel Oghre from (France) Bordeaux
- (England) Sam Wolstenholme from (England) Leicester Tigers
- (England) Deago Bailey promoted from Academy
- (England) Joe Owen promoted from Academy
- (South Africa) Benhard Janse van Rensburg from (England) London Irish
- (England) Josh Caulfield from (England) London Irish
- (Argentina) Santiago Grondona from (France) Pau
- (England) Kofi Cripps from (England) Wasps (short-term deal)
- (France) Virimi Vakatawa unattached
- (Scotland) Sam Grahamslaw from Jersey Reds (short-term deal)
- (Scotland) Steven Longwell from (Italy) Zebre Parma (short-term deal)
- (Argentina) Benjamín Grondona from (Argentina) Pampas XV

=== Players Out ===
- (Ireland) Joe Joyce to (Ireland) Connacht
- (England) Will Porter to (England) Harlequins
- (Fiji) Semi Radradra to (France) Lyon
- (England) Sam Bedlow to (England) Sale Sharks
- (England) Andy Uren to (Italy) Benetton
- (England) Morgan Eames to (France) Bourgoin-Jallieu
- (Wales) Ioan Lloyd to (Wales) Scarlets
- (Ireland) Bryan Byrne to (England) Newcastle Falcons
- (England) Pete Carter released
- (Wales) Sam Lewis released
- (England) Aaron Thompson released
- (Tonga) Charles Piutau to (Japan) Shizuoka Blue Revs
- (England) Rhys Charalambous to (England) London Scottish
- (England) John Hawkins to Jersey Reds
- (Wales) Jac Lloyd to (Australia) Sydney University
- (Ireland) Martin Mulhall to (Australia) Warringah
- (England) Sam Jeffries to (Japan) Tokyo Sungoliath
- (Scotland) Jake Kerr to (Scotland) Watsonian
- (England) Tom Wilstead to (England) Rosslyn Park
- (England) Henry Purdy to (France) Agen
- (Wales) Toby Fricker to (England) Northampton Saints
- (England) Charlie Rice to (England) Cornish Pirates (short-term loan)
- (England) Kofi Cripps to (England) Clifton
- (Wales) Joe Jenkins to (England) Cornish Pirates (short-term loan)
- (England) Charlie Powell released
- (Scotland) Steven Longwell to (United States) Old Glory DC

== Exeter Chiefs ==
=== Players In ===
- (Wales) Joe Hawkins from (Wales) Ospreys
- (England) Will Haydon-Wood from (France) Massy
- (New Zealand) Ethan Roots from (Wales) Ospreys
- (Italy) Ross Vintcent from (England) Exeter University
- (Ireland) Eoin O'Connor from (Ireland) Munster
- (England) Junior Kpoku from (England) Saracens
- (Ireland) Niall Armstrong from (England) Exeter University
- (England) Matt Postlethwaite from (England) Sale Sharks
- (England) Joe Snow from (England) Coventry
- (England) Hallam Chapman from Jersey Reds
- (England) Will Rigg from (England) Coventry

=== Players Out ===
- (England) Sam Simmonds to (France) Montpellier
- (Zimbabwe) Dave Ewers to (Ireland) Ulster
- (England) Harry Williams to (France) Montpellier
- (South Africa) Jannes Kirsten to (South Africa) Bulls
- (England) Jack Nowell to (France) La Rochelle
- (Scotland) Stuart Hogg retired
- (England) Shea Cornish to (England) Plymouth Albion
- (Scotland) Ollie Leatherbarrow to (England) Newcastle Falcons
- (Ireland) Seán O'Brien to (Ireland) Munster
- (England) Ben Moon retired
- (Ireland) Ian Whitten retired
- (Tonga) Solomone Kata to (England) Leicester Tigers
- (England) Archie Hill to (England) Plymouth Albion
- (England) Joe Simmonds to (France) Pau
- (Zimbabwe) Mike Williams to (England) Leicester Tigers
- (England) Luke Cowan-Dickie to (England) Sale Sharks
- (England) Jack Maunder to (Australia) Melbourne Rebels
- (Wales) Oli Burrows to (England) Cornish Pirates (season-long loan)
- (England) Junior Kpoku to (France) Racing 92
- (England) James Kenny to (Wales) Ospreys (season-long loan)
- (New Zealand) Tom Hendrickson to (Japan) Hanazano Liners
- (England) Hallam Chapman to (England) Cornish Pirates (season-long loan)
- (England) Frankie Nowell released
- (Wales) Iestyn Harris to (England) Cornish Pirates (short-term loan)
- (Scotland) Jonny Gray released
- (Ireland) Rory O'Loughlin retired

== Gloucester ==
=== Players In ===
- (England) Zach Mercer from (France) Montpellier
- (Wales) Max Llewellyn from (Wales) Cardiff
- (England) Ben Donnell from (England) London Irish
- (Ireland) Caolan Englefield from (England) London Irish
- (England) Afolabi Fasogbon from (England) London Irish
- (England) Rory Taylor from (England) London Irish
- (England) Seb Atkinson promoted from Academy
- (England) Cameron Jordan promoted from Academy
- (England) Monty Bradbury from (England) London Irish
- (England) Micky Young from (France) Toulon (short-term deal)
- (England) Charlie Atkinson from (England) Leicester Tigers
- (Zimbabwe) Lovejoy Chawatama from (England) Harlequins (short-term loan)
- (Ireland) Adam McBurney from (Scotland) Edinburgh (short-term loan)
- (England) Will Crane from (England) Hartpury University (short-term loan)

=== Players Out ===
- (England) Tom Seabrook to (England) Northampton Saints
- (England) Finn Theobald-Thomas to (England) Leicester Tigers
- (England) Ben Morgan retired
- (Italy) Jake Polledri to (Italy) Zebre Parma
- (England) Billy Twelvetrees to (England) Ealing Trailfinders
- (England) Jenson Boughton to (England) Plymouth Albion
- (Australia) Jordy Reid to (England) Ealing Trailfinders
- (England) Ollie Adkins to (Australia) Randwick
- (England) Jack Bartlett to (England) Coventry
- (Wales) Keillen Cullen released
- (England) Isaac Marsh released
- (Australia) Ben Meehan released
- (England) Henry Pearson released
- (Scotland) Alex Craig to (Wales) Scarlets
- (England) Henry Walker to (England) Ealing Trailfinders
- (Ireland) Bryan O'Connor to (England) Bedford Blues
- (England) Kyle Moyle to (England) Cornish Pirates
- (Wales) Alex Morgan to (England) Hartpury University
- (England) Josh Gray to (England) Hartpury University
- (Georgia (country)) Giorgi Kveseladze to (Georgia (country)) Black Lion
- (England) Jack Singleton to (France) Toulon (season-long loan)
- (Wales) Louis Rees-Zammit released
- (England) Arthur Clark to (England) Harlequins (short-term loan)
- (England) Reece Dunn to (Wales) Ebbw Vale (short-term loan)
- (England) Ben Donnell to (Wales) Cardiff
- (England) Micky Young released
- (England) Harry Taylor to (Wales) Dragons (short-term loan)
- (England) Mark Atkinson retired
- (England) Monty Bradbury retired

== Harlequins ==
=== Players In ===
- (England) Joe Launchbury from (Japan) Toyota Verblitz
- (England) Will Porter from (England) Bristol Bears
- (Wales) Jarrod Evans from (Wales) Cardiff
- (Wales) Dillon Lewis from (Wales) Cardiff
- (England) Roma Zheng from (Wales) Cardiff Metropolitan University
- (Scotland) Cameron Anderson from (England) London Scottish
- (Zimbabwe) Lovejoy Chawatama from (England) London Irish
- (England) Chandler Cunningham-South from (England) London Irish
- (England) Will Joseph from (England) London Irish
- (United States) Makeen Alikhan promoted from Academy
- (England) Hayden Hyde promoted from Academy
- (Australia) Tom Osborne promoted from Academy
- (England) Will Trenholm promoted from Academy
- (England) Max Green from (England) Bath (short-term deal)
- (England) Arthur Clark from (England) Gloucester (short-term loan)

=== Players Out ===
- (South Africa) Wilco Louw to (South Africa) Bulls
- (England) Joe Marchant to (France) Stade Français
- (Italy) Tommaso Allan to (France) Perpignan
- (England) Josh Bassett to (England) Leicester Tigers
- (England) Aaron Morris retired
- (Scotland) Scott Steele to (Scotland) Edinburgh
- (England) Conor Oresanya released
- (Ireland) Jack Stafford released
- (England) Ross Chisholm retired
- (England) Rhys Litterick to (Wales) Cardiff
- (England) Charlie Matthews to (France) Biarritz
- (Tonga) Viliami Taulani to (New Zealand) Counties Manukau
- (Scotland) Cameron Anderson to (England) London Scottish (season-long loan)
- (England) Luke Wallace released
- (United States) Makeen Alikhan to (United States) Dallas Jackals (season-long loan)
- (Zimbabwe) Lovejoy Chawatama to (England) Gloucester (short-term loan)

== Leicester Tigers ==
=== Players In ===
- (England) Josh Bassett from (England) Harlequins
- (South Africa) Kyle Hatherell from (France) La Rochelle
- (England) Jamie Shillcock from (Japan) Mitsubishi DynaBoars
- (England) Finn Theobald-Thomas from (England) Gloucester
- (England) Ollie Hassell-Collins from (England) London Irish
- (Tonga) Solomone Kata from (England) Exeter Chiefs
- (Australia) Sam Carter from (Ireland) Ulster
- (Australia) Joe Powell from (England) London Irish
- (England) Matt Rogerson from (England) London Irish
- (England) Kieran Wilkinson from (England) Sale Sharks
- (Zimbabwe) Mike Williams from (England) Exeter Chiefs (short-term deal)
- (Scotland) Elliot Gourlay from (England) Sale Sharks
- (England) Ollie Allan from (England) London Irish
- (Australia) Ben Woollett from Jersey Reds (short-term deal)
- (England) Anthony Watson unattached

=== Players Out ===
- (New Zealand) Sean Jansen to (Ireland) Connacht
- (England) Sam Wolstenholme to (England) Bristol Bears
- (England) Chris Ashton retired
- (England) Tom West to (England) Saracens
- (South Africa) Eli Snyman to (Italy) Benetton
- (England) Calum Green released
- (England) George Loose released
- (Wales) Riley Williams released
- (England) Harry Potter to (Australia) Western Force
- (New Zealand) Jimmy Gopperth to (France) Provence
- (England) Chester Owen to (England) Coventry
- (England) Anthony Watson released
- (Tonga) Hosea Saumaki to (Japan) Kurita Water Gush
- (Zimbabwe) Mike Williams to (Japan) Kurita Water Gush
- (England) Charlie Atkinson to (England) Gloucester
- (England) Joe Browning released
- (Fiji) Kini Murimurivalu to (France) Limoges
- (Australia) Joe Powell to (France) Lyon
- (England) Rob Carmichael to (Scotland) Edinburgh
- (Australia) Sam Carter to (Australia) Western Force
- (Australia) Ben Woollett released

== London Irish ==
=== Players In ===
- (England) Michael Dykes promoted from Academy
- (England) Tom Collins from (England) Northampton Saints
- (Argentina) Rodrigo Martínez from (Argentina) Pampas XV

=== Players Out ===
- (England) Tom Parton to (England) Saracens
- (Australia) Rob Simmons to (France) Clermont
- (England) Ollie Hassell-Collins to (England) Leicester Tigers
- (Italy) Giosuè Zilocchi to (Italy) Benetton
- (South Africa) Kyle Cooper released
- (England) Isaac Curtis-Harris released
- (England) Louie Kirkham released
- (England) Oran Murphy released
- (Scotland) Oliver Stirling released
- (Ireland) Hugh O'Sullivan to (England) Newcastle Falcons
- (Tonga) Adam Coleman to (France) Bordeaux
- (Samoa) So'otala Fa'aso'o to (France) Perpignan
- (England) Tarrek Haffar to (England) Northampton Saints
- (England) Chunya Munga to (England) Northampton Saints
- (England) Tom Pearson to (England) Northampton Saints
- (Ireland) Paddy Jackson to (France) Lyon
- (England) Henry Arundell to (France) Racing 92
- (South Africa) Benhard Janse van Rensburg to (England) Bristol Bears
- (Scotland) Ben White to (France) Toulon
- (England) Rory Jennings to (England) Newcastle Falcons
- (Zimbabwe) Lovejoy Chawatama to (England) Harlequins
- (England) Chandler Cunningham-South to (England) Harlequins
- (England) Will Joseph to (England) Harlequins
- (Australia) Ollie Hoskins to (England) Saracens
- (South Africa) Mike Willemse to (England) Ealing Trailfinders
- (England) Josh Caulfield to (England) Bristol Bears
- (Argentina) Lucio Cinti to (England) Saracens
- (England) Ben Donnell to (England) Gloucester
- (England) Michael Dykes to (England) Gloucester
- (Ireland) Caolan Englefield to (England) Gloucester
- (England) Afolabi Fasogbon to (England) Gloucester
- (England) Rory Taylor to (England) Gloucester
- (Argentina) Agustín Creevy to (England) Sale Sharks
- (England) Ben Atkins to (England) Rams
- (Wales) Ed Scragg to (Wales) Scarlets
- (England) Jacob Atkins to (Italy) Rovigo Delta
- (Australia) Joe Powell to (England) Leicester Tigers
- (England) Matt Rogerson to (England) Leicester Tigers
- (Scotland) Kyle Rowe to (Scotland) Glasgow Warriors
- (Italy) Danilo Fischetti to (Italy) Zebre Parma
- (England) Matt Cornish to (England) Ealing Trailfinders
- (England) George Makepeace-Cubitt to (England) Rams
- (England) Mikey Summerfield to (England) Bath
- (England) Tom Hitchcock to (England) Ealing Trailfinders
- (England) Calum Scott to (England) Rams
- (Scotland) Logan Trotter to (Scotland) Glasgow Warriors
- (England) Ralph McEachran to (England) Sale Sharks
- (Fiji) Api Ratuniyarawa to (France) Bayonne
- (Argentina) Juan Martín González to (England) Saracens
- (Argentina) Rodrigo Martínez to (Wales) Dragons
- (Argentina) Ignacio Ruiz to (France) Perpignan
- (England) Tom Collins to (England) Ealing Trailfinders
- (Argentina) Facundo Gigena to (France) Pau
- (England) Tayo Adegbemile to (England) Saracens
- (England) Jack Cooke to (Ireland) Lansdowne
- (England) Ciaran Parker to (Wales) Cardiff
- (Scotland) Isaac Miller to (England) Rosslyn Park
- (England) James Stokes to (England) Rosslyn Park
- (England) Matt Williams to (England) Rosslyn Park
- (England) Monty Bradbury to (England) Gloucester
- (England) Jake Shortland to (England) Cinderford
- (England) Josh Smart to (England) Ampthill
- (England) Luke Green to (England) Northampton Saints
- (England) Izaiha Moore-Aiono to (England) Northampton Saints
- (England) Jarlath Gleeson to (France) Lyon
- (England) Ben Loader to (South Africa) Stormers
- (England) Will Goodrick-Clarke to (England) Ealing Trailfinders
- (England) Lucas Brooke to (England) Exeter University
- (Italy) Luca Morisi to (Italy) Zebre Parma
- (Scotland) Charlie Moss to (France) Montpellier
- (England) Josh Basham to (Japan) Shimizu Blue Sharks
- (England) Ollie Allan to (England) Leicester Tigers
- (England) Alex Harmes to (England) Ampthill
- (England) Charlie Griffin to (England) Saracens

== Newcastle Falcons ==
=== Players In ===
- (Scotland) Murray McCallum from (Scotland) Edinburgh
- (Scotland) Kiran McDonald from (Ireland) Munster
- (England) Tim Cardall from (Australia) Melbourne Rebels
- (England) John Kelly from (England) Doncaster Knights
- (Scotland) Ollie Leatherbarrow from (England) Exeter Chiefs
- (England) Guy Pepper promoted from Academy
- (England) Josh Bainbridge from (England) Coventry
- (Ireland) Bryan Byrne from (England) Bristol Bears
- (Scotland) Cammy Hutchison from (Scotland) Edinburgh
- (England) Louis Brown from (England) Coventry
- (England) Adam Scott from (England) Newcastle University
- (Ireland) Hugh O'Sullivan from (England) London Irish
- (Argentina) Eduardo Bello from (England) Saracens
- (England) Rory Jennings from (England) London Irish
- (South Africa) Michael van Vuuren from (South Africa) Lions
- (Wales) Sam Cross from (Wales) Ospreys
- (England) John Hawkins from Jersey Reds
- (England) James Elliott from Jersey Reds
- (South Africa) Jordan Holgate from Jersey Reds

=== Players Out ===
- (England) Will Welch retired
- (England) Alex Tait retired
- (England) James Blackett released
- (England) Jeremy Civil released
- (England) Chidera Obonna released
- (England) Charlie Smith released
- (England) Conrad Cade released
- (England) Connor Collett released
- (Ireland) Conor Kenny released
- (Scotland) Tom Marshall released
- (Ireland) Matthew Dalton to (France) Soyaux Angoulême
- (South Africa) Tian Schoeman released
- (Samoa) Logovi'i Mulipola to (France) Montpellier
- (England) Carl Fearns to (France) Carcassonne
- (Scotland) Gary Graham to (France) Carcassonne
- (England) Sean Robinson to (Japan) Kyuden Voltex
- (England) Micky Young to (France) Toulon
- (Spain) Josh Peters to (France) Bourg-en-Bresse
- (England) Pete Lucock to (England) Leeds Tykes
- (England) Logan Noble to (England) Cambridge
- (England) Ewan Greenlaw to (England) Ampthill
- (United States) Greg Peterson to (Scotland) Glasgow Warriors
- (Fiji) Cameron Nordli-Kelemeti to (United States) New England Free Jacks
- (Fiji) Vereimi Qorowale to (England) Doncaster Knights (season-long loan)
- (Argentina) Mateo Carreras to (France) Bayonne
- (South Africa) Jordan Holgate to (England) Ealing Trailfinders
- (Argentina) Matías Orlando to (United States) Miami Sharks

== Northampton Saints ==
=== Players In ===
- (England) Curtis Langdon from (France) Montpellier
- (South Africa) Burger Odendaal from (Japan) Toshiba Brave Lupus
- (England) Tom Seabrook from (England) Gloucester
- (Fiji) Temo Mayanavanua from (France) Lyon
- (England) Will Glister from (England) Wasps
- (England) Reuben Logan from (England) Wasps
- (England) Elliot Millar-Mills from (Scotland) Edinburgh
- (Cameroon) Beltus Nonleh from (England) Sedgley Tigers
- (England) Tarrek Haffar from (England) London Irish
- (England) Chunya Munga from (England) London Irish
- (England) Tom Pearson from (England) London Irish
- (England) James Cherry from (England) Nottingham (short-term loan)
- (England) Oscar Daniel from (England) Loughborough University (short-term loan)
- (Wales) Toby Fricker from (England) Bristol Bears (short-term deal)
- (England) Luke Green from (England) London Irish (short-term deal)
- (England) Henri Lavin from (England) Loughborough University (short-term loan)
- (England) Izaiha Moore-Aiono from (England) London Irish (short-term deal)
- (England) Theo Vukašinović from (England) Doncaster Knights (short-term deal)
- (England) Gabriel Hamer-Webb from (Wales) Cardiff (short-term deal)
- (Australia) Charlie Savala from (Scotland) Edinburgh

=== Players Out ===
- (England) David Ribbans to (France) Toulon
- (England) Mike Haywood retired
- (England) Joseph Gaffan released
- (England) Frankie Sleightholme released
- (England) James Fish to (England) Bedford Blues
- (England) Tom Collins to (England) London Irish
- (England) Karl Wilkins to (France) Montauban
- (Australia) Lukhan Salakaia-Loto to (Australia) Melbourne Rebels
- (Ireland) Oisín Heffernan to (England) Bedford Blues
- (New Zealand) Matt Proctor to (Australia) Melbourne Rebels
- (Samoa) Brandon Nansen to (France) Grenoble
- (South Africa) Courtnall Skosan to (South Africa) Stormers
- (England) Ethan Grayson to (England) Bedford Blues
- (England) Callum Burns to (England) Old Northamptonians
- (England) Archie Kean to (England) Loughborough Students RUFC
- (Wales) Toby Fricker to (Wales) Ospreys
- (England) Alfie Petch to (France) Biarritz
- (England) Luke Green to (England) Ampthill
- (England) Izaiha Moore-Aiono to (England) Ampthill
- (England) Danny Hobbs-Awoyemi to (Israel) Tel Aviv Heat
- (England) James Grayson to (Japan) Mitsubishi DynaBoars
- (England) Theo Vukašinović to (United States) Rugby FC Los Angeles

== Sale Sharks ==
=== Players In ===
- (England) Sam Bedlow from (England) Bristol Bears
- (South Africa) Ernst van Rhyn from (South Africa) Stormers
- (Tonga) Telusa Veainu from (France) Stade Français
- (Argentina) Agustín Creevy from (England) London Irish
- (England) Luke Cowan-Dickie from (England) Exeter Chiefs
- (England) Ralph McEachran from (England) London Irish
- (England) Obi Ene from (England) Newcastle University
- (England) Cameron Neild from (Scotland) Edinburgh (short-term deal)
- (South Africa) Hyron Andrews from (South Africa) Sharks (short-term deal)
- (Wales) WillGriff John from (France) Montauban (short-term deal)

=== Players Out ===
- (Scotland) Ewan Ashman to (Scotland) Edinburgh
- (England) Will Cliff retired
- (Scotland) Byron McGuigan retired
- (South Africa) Jono Ross retired
- (England) Dominic Barrow released
- (England) Ryan Mills released
- (New Zealand) Jason Woodward released
- (South Africa) Coenie Oosthuizen to (South Africa) Sharks
- (South Africa) Akker van der Merwe to (South Africa) Bulls
- (England) Kieran Wilkinson to (England) Leicester Tigers
- (England) Joe Bedlow to (England) Doncaster Knights (season-long loan)
- (England) Ben Carlile to (England) Sale FC 1861
- (England) Matt Postlethwaite to (England) Exeter Chiefs
- (Scotland) Elliot Gourlay to (England) Leicester Tigers
- (England) Sam Hill to (England) Blackheath
- (Wales) Joe Jones to (Wales) Scarlets

== Saracens ==
=== Players In ===
- (England) Tom Parton from (England) London Irish
- (England) Tom Willis from (France) Bordeaux
- (England) Gareth Simpson from (Australia) Western Force
- (England) Tom West from (England) Leicester Tigers
- (Australia) Ollie Hoskins from (England) London Irish
- (Argentina) Lucio Cinti from (England) London Irish
- (Argentina) Juan Martín González from (England) London Irish
- (England) Tayo Adegbemile from (England) London Irish
- (Samoa) Sam Asotasi from (Samoa) Lauli'i Lions
- (England) Jasper McGuire from (England) Newcastle University
- (England) Olly Hartley promoted from Academy
- (England) Charlie Griffin from (England) London Irish
- (England) James Hadfield from Jersey Reds
- (Samoa) Logovi'i Mulipola from (France) Montpellier
- (South Africa) Tim Swiel from (Scotland) Edinburgh (short-term deal)

=== Players Out ===
- (England) Max Malins to (England) Bristol Bears
- (Scotland) Robin Hislop to (Scotland) Edinburgh
- (United States) Ruben de Haas to (South Africa) Cheetahs
- (England) Jackson Wray retired
- (Scotland) Duncan Taylor retired
- (England) Obinna Nkwocha to (England) Coventry
- (Argentina) Eduardo Bello to (England) Newcastle Falcons
- (England) Dominic Morris to (Wales) Ospreys (season-long loan)
- (England) Charlie Reynolds-West to (Hong Kong) Kowloon
- (England) Junior Kpoku to (England) Exeter Chiefs
- (Samoa) Sam Asotasi to (England) Ampthill (season-long loan)
- (England) Jasper McGuire to (England) Ampthill (season-long loan)
- (England) James Flynn to (England) Ampthill
- (South Africa) Francois Hougaard to (South Africa) Sharks
- (Wales) Ethan Lewis to (Wales) Ospreys
- (England) Tom Woolstencroft retired

== See also ==
- List of 2023–24 United Rugby Championship transfers
- List of 2023–24 RFU Championship transfers
- List of 2023–24 Super Rugby transfers
- List of 2023–24 Top 14 transfers
- List of 2023–24 Rugby Pro D2 transfers
- List of 2023–24 Major League Rugby transfers
