= 2019–20 Bristol Bears season =

(England) Bristol Bears
- Full name: Bristol Rugby Club
- Union: Gloucestershire RFU
- Nickname: Bears
- Founded: 1888; 138 years ago
- Location: Bristol, England
- Ground: Ashton Gate Stadium (Capacity: 27,000)
- Chairman: Chris Booy
- CEO: Mark Tainton
- Director of Rugby: Pat Lam
- Captain: Steven Luatua
- League: English Premiership
- 2018-19: 9th
1st kit	2nd kit

Official website
- www.bristolbearsrugby.com
- Current season

The 2019–20 season is Bristol Bears's 2nd consecutive season in the Premiership Rugby. Along with competing in the Premiership, the club will also participate in the European Challenge Cup and Premiership Rugby Shield.

== Squad ==
Note: Flags indicate national union under World Rugby eligibility rules. Players may hold more than one non-World Rugby nationality.

Player	Position	Union
Will Capon	Hooker	England
Harry Thacker	Hooker	England
Bryan Byrne	Hooker	Ireland
John Afoa	Prop	New Zealand
Jake Armstrong	Prop	England
Max Lahiff	Prop	England
Kyle Sinckler	Prop	England
Yann Thomas	Prop	England
Jake Woolmore	Prop	England
Dave Attwood	Lock	England
John Hawkins	Lock	England
Ed Holmes	Lock	England
Joe Joyce	Lock	Ireland
Chris Vui	Lock	Samoa
James Dun	Back row	England
Mitch Eadie	Back row	Scotland
Ben Earl (loan)	Back row	England
Jake Heenan	Back row	New Zealand
Nathan Hughes	Back row	England
Steve Luatua (c)	Back row	New Zealand
Dan Thomas	Back row	Wales

Player	Position	Union
Chris Cook	Scrum-half	England
Harry Randall	Scrum-half	England
Andy Uren	Scrum-half	England
Tiff Eden	Fly-half	England
Callum Sheedy	Fly-half	Wales
Sam Bedlow	Centre	England
Piers O'Conor	Centre	England
Siale Piutau	Centre	Tonga
Charlie Powell	Centre	England
Semi Radradra	Centre	Fiji
Toby Fricker	Wing	Wales
Alapati Leiua	Wing	Samoa
Luke Morahan	Wing	Australia
Ratu Naulago	Wing	Fiji
Henry Purdy	Wing	England
Charles Piutau	Fullback	New Zealand
Max Malins (loan)	Fullback	England

== Transfers ==
=== Players In ===
- (England) Nathan Hughes from (England) Wasps
- (England) Dave Attwood from (England) Bath
- (England) Sam Bedlow promoted from Academy
- (England) John Hawkins promoted from Academy
- (Wales) Toby Fricker from (Wales) Ebbw Vale
- (Samoa) Jordan Lay returned from (Wales) Ospreys
- (Wales) Nicky Thomas from (Wales) Scarlets
- (Jamaica) Tyrese Johnson-Fisher from (United States) Coastal Carolina Chanticleers
- (England) Max Lahiff from (England) Bath
- (England) Henry Purdy from (England) Coventry
- (New Zealand) Adrian Choat from (New Zealand) Auckland (short-term loan)
- (Ireland) Bryan Byrne from (Ireland) Leinster (short-term loan)

=== Players out ===
- (Australia) Nick Haining to (Scotland) Edinburgh
- (England) Jack Tovey to (England) Ealing Trailfinders
- (Scotland) Reiss Cullen to (England) Doncaster Knights
- (Australia) George Smith retired
- (South Africa) Nick Fenton-Wells retired
- (New Zealand) Joe Latta to (Japan) Suntory Sungoliath/ (New Zealand) Otago
- (Samoa) Tusi Pisi to (Japan) Toyota Industries Shuttles
- (England) Ehize Ehizode to (England) Chinnor
- (Tonga) Sione Faletau to (England) Yorkshire Carnegie
- (Australia) Tom Pincus to (Australia) Melbourne Rebels
- (Samoa) Jack Lam released
- (Jamaica) Tyrese Johnson-Fisher released
- (England) Sam Jeffries Sabbatical

The Following transfers were made ahead of the 2020–21 season, however due to COVID-19, there was a break in the season and the following transfers came into effect before the season restarted.

==== Players In ====
- (Fiji) Semi Radradra from (France) Bordeaux
- (England) Kyle Sinckler from (England) Harlequins
- (Scotland) Mitch Eadie from (England) Northampton Saints
- (England) Ben Earl from (England) Saracens (season-long loan)
- (England) Max Malins from (England) Saracens (season-long loan)
- (England) Chris Cook from (England) Bath
- (Fiji) Ratu Naulago from (England) Hull FC
- (England) Will Capon promoted from Academy
- (England) James Dun promoted from Academy
- (England) Charlie Powell promoted from Academy
- (Ireland) Bryan Byrne from (Ireland) Leinster

==== Players Out ====
- (England) Jordan Crane retired
- (England) Aly Muldowney retired
- (Wales) Mat Protheroe to (Wales) Ospreys
- (Wales) Nicky Thomas to (Wales) Ospreys
- (Ireland) Ian Madigan to (Ireland) Ulster
- (Australia) Nic Stirzaker to (France) Montauban
- (England) Joe Batley to (England) Worcester Warriors
- (England) Tom Lindsay retired
- (New Zealand) Adrian Choat released
- (England) Ryan Edwards released
- (Samoa) James Lay released
- (Samoa) Jordan Lay released
- (England) Luke Daniels to (England) Ealing Trailfinders
- (England) Ollie Dawe to Jersey Reds
- (England) Lewis Thiede to (England) Ealing Trailfinders
- (England) Sam Graham to (England) Doncaster Knights
- (South Africa) Shaun Malton to (England) Ealing Trailfinders
- (Scotland) Luke Hamilton to (France) Oyonnax
