= Liam Middleton =

Zimbabwean rugby union coach

- Born: June 19, 1977 (age 49) Harare, Zimbabwe

Rugby union career
Coaching career
- Years: Team
- Canada 7s
- 2004–2010: Zimbabwe 7s

Liam Middleton (born June 19, 1977) is a Professional Rugby Union coach in both the 15-a-side and 7 a-side versions of the game. He is an International coach with a Level 4 qualification and is a World Rugby coach educator.

== Early life and education ==
Liam Middleton was born in Harare. He attended Watershed College from 1991 to 1996, where he captained the rugby team.

== Rugby Union coaching career ==
Years	Club/Team
Jul 2011 – Mar 2013	Bristol Rugby
Jun 2009 – Jun 2011	England Rugby Academy / Bristol Rugby
Jul 2008 – Jun 2009	Rugby Football Union
Jan 2002 – May 2008	Hartpury College Rugby Academy
Jan 2000 – Dec 2001	Howick High School, KwaZulu Natal, South Africa

Liam Middleton started his coaching career at Howick High School in KwaZulu Natal, South Africa in 2000.

In January 2002 he left South Africa and joined the coaching staff of the Hartpury College Rugby Academy in Gloucestershire, England as one of its founding members. Now considered the leading rugby academy in the world for producing professional and international players. As a high performance coach, he coached the Hartpury 1st XV with former Wales assistant coach, Allan Lewis. During his tenure the Academy 1st XV won the British University Championship for 3 consecutive seasons and the college's first University 7s title. During this time the Academy produced 9 fully capped international players, one British and Irish Lion and several International 7s players. Middleton also coached England Colleges and the British Colleges teams on various international tours.

Middleton was Director of Rugby at Cheltenham RFC from 2005 to 2009, guiding them to promotion to the National Leagues in 2009, where the team scored a record number of league tries in the Club's history.

In 2008, Middleton joined England Rugby as Talent Identification Manager.

Following this he joined Bristol Rugby Club (BRFC) in June 2009 as Academy Manager where his reputation for identifying and developing talented players was created. The Academy process established by Middleton produced 13 Bristol 1st XV status and notably England and British and Irish Lions prop Mako Vunipola and current England prop, Ellis Genge. During the 2010 season Middleton assisted Paul Hull in the coaching of the Bristol 1st XV where they were winners of the British and Irish Cup. In July 2011 Liam was promoted to head coach of Bristol Rugby Club. Known as an innovative and tactically astute coach, he guided the Bristol first team from 8th place in the RFU Championship to 1st place, topping the league by 7 clear points. During his time in charge he led the Club on their longest run of home victories in the club's history, and boasted an unbeaten record against perennial Championship performers Bedford Blues.

In September 2012 he was named as an assistant coach for the Championship XV to play against the New Zealand Maoris, but withdrew due to family commitments.

Middleton left Bristol Rugby Club in March 2013 replaced by former Scotland head coach, Andy Robinson.

On October 16, 2013, the Zimbabwe Rugby Union appointed Middleton as the new Director of Rugby and his immediate task is working with the Sables who are billed to play at the 2013 Namibian Tri-Nations tournament that also includes Kenya and Namibia.

== Sevens coaching ==
Liam Middleton was head coach of the Zimbabwe 7s team from June 2004 to December 2010. Known as the ‘Cheetahs’, he developed the National 7s team into a recognised competitive team on the World Sevens Series. Middleton led the Cheetahs to the 2009 Rugby World Cup 7s in Dubai where they won an impressive 4 out of their 6 games, culminating in a Bowl Final victory against Ireland. In 2006, he was named head coach of the Great Britain Students 7s team for the World University Games 2006 in Rome where the team were Silver medalists. Canada Rugby appointed Middleton as head coach of the Canada 7s team in 2014. Most notably he became the first coach of a Canadian rugby team to beat New Zealand when the team overcame the All Black Sevens team at the Tokyo 7s in April 2015, repeating the feat again in Cape Town in Dec 2015. Middleton led the Canada 7s team to a Gold Medal at the Pan Am Games in July 2015. In 2016, he led the home nation in its inaugural home tournament in the Vancouver leg of the World Sevens Series. Despite a narrow loss in their opening match the team went on to win all five of their remaining games culminating in a spectacular Bowl Final win over France.

== Commentator and consultant ==
Middleton spent time as an Analyst Commentator for Kwese ESPN covering 15 and 7 a-side events around Africa.

He consults for several sports organisations and continues to coach rugby union. He has consulted for a professional club in Russia.
