= Waddilove =

Waddilove is a surname. Notable people with the surname include:

- Charles Waddilove (1828–1896), British Royal Navy officer
- Darley Waddilove (1736–1828), British deacon
- Sean Waddilove, (born 1997) Irish Olympic sailor

== See also ==
- Waddilove High School, Methodist High School in Marondera, Zimbabwe
- The Way I Loved You (disambiguation)
