= 2021 Top Challenge League =

- Date: 13 February – 3 April 2021
- Champions: Toyota Industries Shuttles
- Runners-up: Kintetsu Liners
- Matches played: 24

Official website
- www.rugby.or.jp

The 2021 Top Challenge League (Japanese: ジャパンラグビートップチャレンジリーグ2021) was the eighteenth and final season of the Top Challenge League, the second-tier of Japanese rugby. Similar to the previous season, no promotion was granted. In July 2021, three months following the conclusion of the 2021 season, the Japan Rugby Football Union (JRFU) announced the creation of a new league system and structure, dissolving the Top Challenge League.

The Toyota Industries Shuttles won the 2021 title, defeating the Kintetsu Liners in the final ranking match.

== Background ==
=== Format and dates ===
The competition featured nine teams divided into two conferences (A and B), with each conference contesting a single round-robin stage. This was followed by a ranking tournament, in which participating teams played two additional matches to determine the final standings. The top four teams qualified for the Japan Rugby Top League 2021 playoff tournament. As Conference B contained five teams, its bottom-placed side was classified ninth overall and did not advance to the ranking tournament. At the conclusion of the 2021 Top Challenge League, the top four teams (two from Group A and B) would take place in the Top League play-offs.

The initial schedule, January to March 2021, was postponed to the later dates of February to April 2021.

== Teams and personnel ==
Following the premature cancellation of the 2020 Top League due to the COVID-19 pandemic, no teams were promoted or relegated from the regional leagues. The sole exception was Chugoku Electric Power Red Regulions, which was automatically promoted after becoming the only regional league club to enter the newly established competition.

=== Overview ===
Team	Stadia information	
Team	Stadia	Capacity
Chugoku Electric Power Red Regulions 中国電力レッドレグリオンズ	Hiroshima General Ground, Hiroshima	13,800
Coca-Cola Red Sparks コカ・コーラレッドスパークス	Honjo Athletic Stadium, Kitakyushu	10,000
Kamaishi Seawaves 日本製鉄釜石シーウェイブス	Kamaishi Recovery Memorial Stadium, Kamaishi	6,000
Kintetsu Liners 花園近鉄ライナーズ	Hanazono Rugby Stadium, Higashiōsaka	30,000
Kurita Water Gush 栗田工業ウォーターガッシュ昭島	Kurita Ground, Akishima	—N/a
Kyuden Voltex 九州電力キューデンヴォルテクス	Global Arena, Munakata	10,000
Mazda Blue Zoomers マツダ・ブルー・ズーマーズ	Hiroshima General Ground, Hiroshima	13,800
Shimizu Blue Sharks 清水建設江東ブルーシャークス	Chichibunomiya Rugby Stadium, Aoyama	24,871
Toyota Industries Shuttles 豊田自動織機シャトルズ愛知	Paloma Mizuho Stadium, Nagoya	27,000

2021 Top Challenge League venues

== League standings ==
=== Group A ===
Pos	Team	Pld	W	D	L	PF	PA	PD	TF	TA	TB	LB	Pts
1	Kintetsu Liners	3	3	0	0	158	59	+99	26	8	3	0	15
2	Shimizu Blue Sharks	3	1	0	2	87	126	−39	12	20	0	1	5 (Note: Head-to-head: Shimizu Blue Sharks 21–20 Kamaishi Seawaves)
3	Kamaishi Seawaves	3	1	0	2	70	81	−11	10	12	0	1	5
4	Kurita Water Gush	3	1	0	2	71	120	−49	9	17	0	0	4

Source: Rugby.or.jp

=== Group B ===
Pos	Team	Pld	W	D	L	PF	PA	PD	TF	TA	TB	LB	Pts
1	Toyota Industries Shuttles	4	4	0	0	251	69	+182	38	11	4	0	20
2	Coca-Cola Red Sparks	4	3	0	1	142	59	+83	20	9	3	0	15
3	Kyuden Voltex	4	2	0	2	70	124	−54	11	18	1	0	9
4	Mazda Blue Zoomers	4	1	0	3	37	115	−78	6	16	0	1	5
5	Chugoku Electric Power Red Regulions	4	0	0	4	38	171	−133	6	27	0	1	1

Source: Rugby.or.jp

== League matches ==
=== Group A ===
Home \ Away	KAM	KIN	KUR	BLU
Kamaishi Seawaves	—	15–36	35–24	20–21
Kintetsu Liners	—	—	52–11	70–33
Kurita Water Gush	—	—	—	36–33
Shimizu Blue Sharks	—	—	—	—

Source: Rugby.or.jp
Legend: Blue = home team win; Yellow = draw; Red = away team win.

=== Group B ===
Home \ Away	CHU	RED	VOL	MAZ	SHU
Chugoku Electric Power Red Regulions	—	12–49	14–27	0–5	12–90
Coca-Cola Red Sparks	—	—	35–0	39–8	19–39
Kyuden Voltex	—	—	—	15–14	28–61
Mazda Blue Zoomers	—	—	—	—	10–61
Toyota Industries Shuttles	—	—	—	—	—

Source: Rugby.or.jp
Legend: Blue = home team win; Yellow = draw; Red = away team win.

== Play-offs ==
=== Placement matches ===
Placement semi-finals
21 March – Chōfu
Kurita Water Gush	10
Kyuden Voltex	9
21 March – Chōfu
Kamaishi Seawaves	20
Mazda Blue Zoomers	7

Placement final
3 April – Hiroshima
Kurita Water Gush	22
Kamaishi Seawaves	29
Third place
3 April – Hiroshima
Kyuden Voltex	50
Mazda Blue Zoomers	7

=== Placement semi-finals ===
21 March 2021
11:30 JST (UTC+9)

Kurita Water Gush	10–9	Kyuden Voltex
	Report

AGF Field, Chōfu

21 March 2021
11:30 JST (UTC+9)

Kamaishi Seawaves	20–7	Mazda Blue Zoomers
	Report

AGF Field, Chōfu

=== Seventh place ===
3 April 2021
11:30 JST (UTC+9)

Kyuden Voltex	50–7	Mazda Blue Zoomers
	Report

Balcom BMW Rugby Stadium, Hiroshima
Attendance: 650

=== Fifth place ===
3 April 2021
11:30 JST (UTC+9)

Kurita Water Gush	22–29	Kamaishi Seawaves
	Report

Balcom BMW Rugby Stadium, Hiroshima
Attendance: 650

=== Title bracket ===
Semi-finals
20 March – Higashiōsaka
Shimizu Blue Sharks	21
Toyota Industries Shuttles	83
20 March – Higashiōsaka
Kintetsu Liners	71
Coca-Cola Red Sparks	11

Final
3 April – Higashiōmi
Toyota Industries Shuttles	36
Kintetsu Liners	17
Third place
3 April – Higashiōmi
Shimizu Blue Sharks	21
Coca-Cola Red Sparks	47

=== Semi-finals ===
20 March 2021
11:30 JST (UTC+9)

Shimizu Blue Sharks	21–83	Toyota Industries Shuttles
	Report

Hanazono Rugby Stadium, Higashiōsaka
Attendance: 1,711

20 March 2021
14:01 JST (UTC+9)

Kintetsu Liners	71–11	Coca-Cola Red Sparks
	Report

Hanazono Rugby Stadium, Higashiōsaka
Attendance: 2,690

=== Third place ===
3 April 2021
11:30 JST (UTC+9)

Shimizu Blue Sharks	21–47	Coca-Cola Red Sparks
	Report

Nunobiki Green Stadium, Higashiōmi
Attendance: 1,049

=== Final ===
3 April 2021
14:00 JST (UTC+9)

Toyota Industries Shuttles	36–17	Kintetsu Liners
	Report

Nunobiki Green Stadium, Higashiōmi
Attendance: 1,302

== See also ==
- 2021 Top League
