= Percy Down =

England international rugby union player

- Born: Percy John Down; 14 October 1883 Clifton, England
- Died: 24 June 1954 (aged 70) Weston, England
- School: Dr Kempe's School (Long Ashton)

Rugby union career
- Position: Lock
Amateur team(s)
Years	Team	Apps	(Points)
- Redlands
–	Bristol		
–	Somerset		
International career
Years	Team	Apps	(Points)
1908	Anglo-Welsh	3	(0)
1909	England	1	(0)

Percy John Down (14 October 1883 – 24 June 1954) was an English rugby union player, best known as a commanding forward in the Bristol pack in the twentieth century. He spent the major part of his playing career at the club, and eventually became club chairman.

== Biography ==
- Maule, Raymond (1992). The Complete Who's Who of England Rugby Union Internationals. Derby: Breedon Books. ISBN 1-873626-10-X.
