= Marondera =

Capital city of Mashonaland East Province, Zimbabwe

Marondera Marandellas
- City
- Coat of arms
- Mottoes: Floreat Marondera; (May Marondera Flourish)
- Location within Zimbabwe
- Coordinates: 18°11′23″S 31°32′48″E
- Country: Zimbabwe
- Province: Mashonaland East
- District: Marondera
- Village: 1913
- Town: 1943
- City: 1982

Government
- Elevation: 1,688 m (5,538 ft)

Population (2022 census)
  - Total: 66,203
- Time zone: UTC+2 (CAT)
- Climate: Cwb
- Website: www.maronderardc.org.zw

Marondera, originally known as Marandellas, is a capital city of Mashonaland East, Zimbabwe, located about 72 kilometres (45 mi) east of Harare.

== History ==
It was first known as Marandella's Kraal, corrupted from Marondera, chief of the ruling VaRozvi people who lived in the area. British colonialists as they were colonizing Zimbabwe, first used it as a rest stop on the way to Harare. Later destroyed in the Shona resistance of 1896, the town was moved 4 miles (6 km) north to the Beira–Bulawayo railway line.

Constituted a village in 1913, it became a town in 1943. During the South African (Boer) War, it was used by the British as a staging point for military operations into the Transvaal. During World War II, over 600 Polish refugees, mostly women and children, escaping from Soviet-occupied Poland, were admitted in Marondera. In 1946, the refugee camp was closed, and the Poles were relocated to Gatooma, from where they were eventually repatriated to Europe.

== Demographics ==
Marondera is a multicultural city, with a variety of ethnic groups and a Shona majority. Within the African population is a notable proportion of people of Malawian origin who speak Chichewa and Chitumbuka, and whose parents migrated and took employment on the white owned tobacco farms. White Maronderans are overwhelmingly of British descent, with smaller groups of Dutch, Afrikaans, Greek and other European heritage. Other minorities include mixed race and Asian residents. Most residents of Marondera are traditional or syncretic Christians, predominantly mainline Protestants, Roman Catholics, evangelicals and mapostori (a sect of Old Testament bible followers who live like ancient prophets and may dress in white robes). Islam is practised by a very small minority of people in Marondera, almost all of whom are Asians and people of Malawian descent.

The indigenous people of Marondera descend mainly from the Shona royal families of Svosve, and the nearby royal households of Chikwaka, Nyashanu and others royal family lives there the Mashonganyika family etc. They are traditionally farmers.

== Education ==
Marondera is renowned for its high quality educational institutions, which have educated many of the country's most prominent citizens. The junior schools include Godfrey Huggins, Tapfuma School, Dombotombo School, Lendy Park School Springvale House, Digglefold, R.G Mugabe Primary School, Nyamei Primary School, Ruware Primary School and Ruzawi School and the senior schools are Marondera High School, Peterhouse Boys' School, Peterhouse Girls' School, Rakodzi High, Watershed College, Nyameni High, Cherutombo High, Chitepo Secondary, Bernard Mizeki College, Waddilove High School and Nagle House. The first black mayor of Marondera was T. K. Muronda in 1980.

Marondera also has private and public learning institutions such as Kushinga Phikelela Polytechnic to the east, along the Harare-Mutare road; University of Zimbabwe College of Agricultural Sciences; and the Umaa Institute.

Marondera is perhaps best known as an academic and intellectual centre and is home to many schools and colleges notably:

- Bernard Mizeki College
- Marondera High School
- Peterhouse Boys' School
- Peterhouse Girls' School
- Ruzawi School
- Springvale House
- Waddilove High School
- Watershed College
- Nyameni High School
- Nagle House Girls High School
- Godfrey Huggins Primary School
- Cherutombo High School
- Ruzawi School
- Peterhouse group of schools

== Climate ==
Climate data for Marondera (1961–1990)
Month	Jan	Feb	Mar	Apr	May	Jun	Jul	Aug	Sep	Oct	Nov	Dec	Year
Mean daily maximum °C (°F)	24.8 (76.6)	24.2 (75.6)	24.2 (75.6)	22.9 (73.2)	21.5 (70.7)	19.3 (66.7)	19.2 (66.6)	22.0 (71.6)	25.5 (77.9)	26.0 (78.8)	25.8 (78.4)	24.3 (75.7)	23.3 (73.9)
Mean daily minimum °C (°F)	14.8 (58.6)	14.7 (58.5)	13.8 (56.8)	11.5 (52.7)	8.9 (48.0)	6.1 (43.0)	5.9 (42.6)	7.3 (45.1)	10.5 (50.9)	12.5 (54.5)	13.8 (56.8)	14.5 (58.1)	11.2 (52.2)
Average rainfall mm (inches)	193.4 (7.61)	149.1 (5.87)	90.3 (3.56)	48.7 (1.92)	10.1 (0.40)	5.4 (0.21)	3.0 (0.12)	3.0 (0.12)	6.8 (0.27)	40.3 (1.59)	113.1 (4.45)	187.7 (7.39)	850.9 (33.50)
Average rainy days	14	12	9	5	2	1	1	1	1	5	10	15	76
Source: World Meteorological Organization

Marondera is situated on the highveld plateau, and has a subtropical highland climate (Köppen Cwb). The city enjoys a sunny climate, with the summer months (October to April) characterised by warm to hot days followed by afternoon thundershowers and cool evenings, and the winter months (May to September) by dry, sunny days followed by cold nights. Temperatures are usually fairly mild due to the city's high elevation, with an average maximum daytime temperature in January of 25.6 °C (78.1 °F), dropping to an average maximum of around 16 °C (61 °F) in June.

Winter is the sunniest time of the year, with mild days and cool nights, dropping to 5 °C (39.4 °F) in June and July. The temperature occasionally drops to below freezing at night, causing frost.

Regular cold fronts pass over the city in winter bringing cool southeasterly winds but and grey skies. The annual average rainfall is 850 millimetres, which is mostly concentrated in the summer months. Infrequent showers can occur through the course of the year, especially during spring.

== Notable people ==
- Ryan Burl, Zimbabwean International Cricketer
- Hilton Cartwright, Australian international cricketer
- Eve Christine Gadzikwa, Zimbabwean businesswoman and entrepreneur
- Kate Nicholl, former Lord Mayor of Belfast, Northern Ireland and current Alliance Party MLA for Belfast South
