= Marondera High School =

Information
- Former name: Marandellas High School
- Established: 1960; 66 years ago
- Gender: Mixed
- Houses: Cumberland (boarding, boys); Hampshire (boarding, boys); Sussex (boarding, boys); Kent (boarding, girls); Cornwall (boarding, girls); Tiger (day, boys); Stallion (day, girls)
- Games Houses: Nehanda; Chitepo; Tongogara; Mutapa
- Website: https://maronderahighsch.ac.zw

Marondera High School is a co-educational high school located one and half miles from the Marondera town centre, in Mashonaland East Province, Zimbabwe. The school was established in 1960.

It neighbours Nagle House Girls High School.

Official Website: https://maronderahighsch.ac.zw

Founded in 1960 as Marandellas High School, the school catered for the Marandellas farming community and the surrounding towns.

The school has five boarding houses named after British Royal Navy County Cruisers (ships).

Cumberland (Boys)(The Sables) (HMS Cumberland was built by Armstrong Vickers, launched in 1926 and eventually sold in 1959,

Hampshire (boys and girls form 1 hostel until 1979 perhaps longer)(The Kings) (HMS Hampshire was built by Armstrong Vickers, launched in 1903, and sunk by a mine in 1916, Lord Kitchener was one of 737 of 749 on board people who died)

Sussex (Boys)(The Bulls) (HMS Sussex was launched in 1928, scrapped in 1950) for boys

Kent (girls) (HMS Kent was built by Chatham Dockyard, launched in 1926 and was sold in 1948) and

Cornwall (girls). (HMS Cornwall was built by Devenport Dockyard Plymouth, launched in 1926 and was sunk in the Indian Ocean by the Japanses in 1942.)

The school post 1979 also includes day schooling with Stallion House for the girls and Tiger House (dhibhan'a) for the boys.

The games houses (modern names Nehanda, Chitepo, Tongogara and Mutapa) are named after popular heroes from Zimbabwe. The houses are now represented with the colors red, green, yellow and blue respectively.

The houses were originally bigger than just sporting houses and were known as Nelson (Red), Drake (Blue), Frobisher (White) and Rodney (Yellow), all Royal Navy Admirals (Commanders of fleets of ships). (Green was reserved for the school colour).

The school had a competitive academic and sporting routine: points were awarded to each pupil's house for their classroom and sports achievements and the house with overall best academic and sports performance each month of the year was made public on the noticeboard outside the head's office. The overall winner each year was awarded the Dux prize.

The school has offered a variety of sports over the years which include soccer, rugby, cricket, netball, handball, basketball, volleyball, badminton, tennis, hockey, cross country, athletics, and swimming.

It has included are a variety of clubs: chess, bridge, art, library, +++ which enrich the students culturally and socially.

The school uses the symbol of the lion on its badge. Its blazer is green.

The most notable sport event on the current school calendar is the annual Chinamasa Inter-hostel rugby tournament held in March. Cumberland, Sussex, Hampshire and the tigers go head to head where winner gets a trophy and aid to an annual celebratory braai (bbq). The tournament also serves purpose to identify and select players who go on to form the schools' Rugby first team and represent the school at the annual Dairy Board Rugby School Festival.

== Notable alumni ==
- Graeme Hick - cricketer
- Harry Roberts (rugby union, born 1960)

18.198°S 31.524°E
