= Watershed College =

Location
- 62,5 km peg Peddie Road, off Main Mutare Road; Marondera, P Bag 3718; Zimbabwe; 18.148°S 31.444°E

Information
- Type: Private boarding school, Private Day school
- Motto: Ex Arduis Florio (Latin: Through hard work we shall achieve)
- Denomination: Interdenominational
- Established: 1987
- Headmistress: Fiona Benzon
- Executive headteacher: Miriam Mugomo
- Forms: 1-4, Sixth Form
- Gender: Co-educational
- Enrollment: 337 (2018)
- Student to teacher ratio: 20:1 approx.
- Campus type: Rural
- Houses: Chinyika; Gombora; Nyakambiri
- Colours: Sky Blue, Beige
- Mascot: The Owl
- Nickname: Shed Owls
- Tuition: US$3,500.00 (Forms 1-4); US$3,500.00 (Sixth Form); (Note: Termly fees, the year has 3 terms.)
- Affiliations: ATS; CHISZ
- Website: www.watershed.ac.zw

Watershed College (or Watershed) is a private boarding school situated near Marondera in Zimbabwe. The College provides secondary education as well as an Agricultural course for girls and boys between the ages of 13 and 19. Watershed College is a member of the Association of Trust Schools (ATS) and the Headmistress is a member of the Conference of Heads of Independent Schools in Zimbabwe (CHISZ).

== History ==
Watershed College was formed in 1987 when farmers living in the area in Marondera decided to create a school for their children. The schools around at the time – Peterhouse Group of Schools – were too selective for the farmers and for this reason they decided to form their own institute. Farms were donated to this cause and so began Watershed College.

== List of Heads at Watershed College ==
- Mr Tim Brown (1987–1991)
- Mr MJ. McGuire (1992–1994)
- Mr John Davidson (1995)
- Mr AB. Davey (1996–2000)
- Mr D. Seeliger (2001–2003)
- Dr J. Bradshaw (2003–2009)
- Mrs Angela Charidza (2010–2016)
- Mrs Fiona Benzon (2017–present)

== Notable alumni ==
- Ray Price – Zimbabwean Cricketer
- Liam Middleton – Rugby Union Coach
- Tarisai Musakanda – Zimbabwean Cricketer
- Lovejoy Chawatama – Professional Rugby Player at London Irish
- Ruramiso Mashumba – Farmer/ Agripreneur
- Kudakwashe "Kisset" Chirengende – Kyros Sports Founder
- Clinton Mutambo – Esaja.com Founder
- Kudakwashe Kudenga – Farmer/ Entrepreneur
- Munya Maraire – World Wide Scholarships CEO & first Zimbabwean NFL prospect

== See also ==
- List of schools in Zimbabwe
- List of boarding schools
