= St Paul's College, Sunbury-on-Thames =

St. Paul's Catholic College
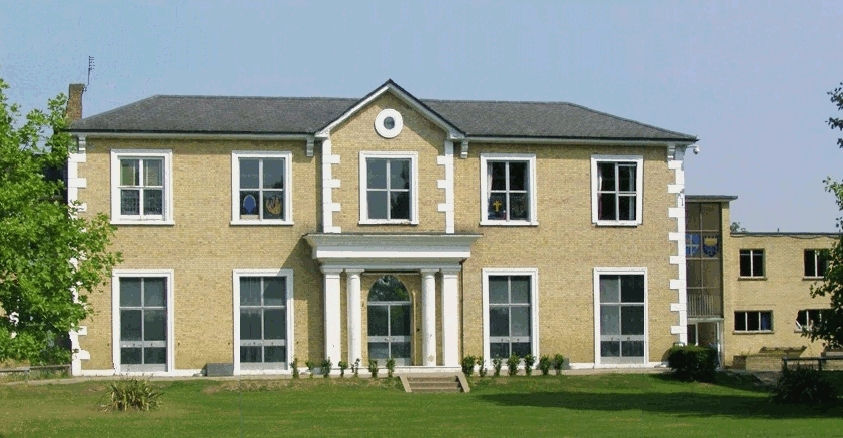

Location
- Manor Lane; Sunbury-on-Thames, Surrey, TW16 6JE; England; 51°24′56″N 0°24′53″W

Information
- Type: Academy
- Motto: Disce prodesse "Achieving excellence, learning to serve" Lit: Learn to 'profit' or 'improve widely' (Note: A common meaning of 'prodesse' alone is usually on oneself however as with 'disce' in an educational context connotes the wider good to others, philanthropy, benefaction.)
- Religious affiliation: Roman Catholic
- Established: September 1988; 37 years ago
- Local authority: Surrey County Council
- Trust: Ascension Catholic Academy Trust
- Department for Education URN: 149290 Tables
- Ofsted: Reports
- Headteacher: James McNulty
- Staff: c. 90
- Gender: Coeducational
- Age: 11 to 18
- Enrolment: c. 1080
- Diocese: Westminster
- Website: www.st-pauls.surrey.sch.uk

St Paul's Catholic College is a coeducational Roman Catholic secondary school and sixth form located in Sunbury-on-Thames, Surrey, England. St Paul's is a 1987 amalgamation of Cardinal Godfrey Boys' School and St Teresa's Girls' School both established in the early 20th century.

== History ==
=== Administration building ===
The elegant two-storey, tall-ceilinged house with many windows formed the heart of St Teresa's Convent School and forms the staff and administration building. It is at the end of the Ridings in Green Street and was built during the reign of William IV, that is between 1830 and 1837 to designs by an unknown architect. It is a Grade II listed building. It has a simple Doric porch (portico), central round window and open pediment with two bays to either side. Under John Alliston it became the manor house during a period of the late Industrial Revolution with increasing population in the region, when the products of the manor's agriculture and fishing were insufficient to support the local population. The former manor house close to the Thames was rebuilt in 1851 as Sunbury Park House. These buildings were described as such in a map of 1865. In 1898, it was the home of William Anthony Mitchison, who planted the 1 mile (1.6 km) avenue of horse chestnuts forming The Avenue in the east of his estate. Before the opening of Sunbury Police Station in 1882, Mr Mitchison, who was the local Justice of the Peace (magistrate) had special permission to conduct the court in a room of this grand house.

After the death of Mr Mitchison, the house changed hands several times. It was owned at one time by a non-Catholic group who were not pleased that the newly built St. Ignatius' Church could be viewed from their windows, so they decided to sell the house and lands. At some time the property was owned by Major Peters and his family. Major Peters had two sons, one of whom was killed in World War I and the other killed in a polo playing accident prompting its sale.

The Sisters of Charity of St. Paul purchased the house and lands in 1926. The Sisters worked in St. Ignatius Primary School which was next to the Church and the former smaller Catholic School opened in 1871, on Green Street. A new building, consisting of three classrooms, a staff room and office, was built on the opposite side of Green Street to accommodate the increasing number of pupils.

=== St Teresa's Girls Convent School ===
At the same time the Sisters opened an independent school, convent school, in the main building. Its entrance gate was near where the present new St. Ignatius' School was built. It led also to the stable buildings and houses for carriages. These were later converted into Art rooms for the school. A wall divided the circular driveway to the entrance hall from a large wooded area. Against this wall were planted apple trees specially grown for cider making. There was a large greenhouse in which was a vine reputed to be a cutting from the one at Hampton Court. The present playing field was originally divided by hedges into four fields. These fields were let to a shop owner on the Feltham Road. He grazed his ponies there and sold ice cream from carts drawn by the ponies.

Changes in the Education Policy meant that the independent school, St. Teresa's, was no longer viable and it became incorporated into the public sector. To facilitate this change, the Sisters built a new school joined to the original building, as well as tennis courts and developed the playing field. At some time London Irish RFC used this field at weekends to train future members of the club. The reputation of St Teresa's became excellent.

=== Cardinal Godfrey Catholic Boys' School ===
Cardinal Godfrey School moved from its first home, the site of Echelford Primary School, Ashford to St Paul's site in October 1975 and is still demarcated in the school as the 'South Site'. The school grew from a very few classes to more than double the number in each year and established a good reputation.

=== Amalgamation 1988 ===
During the summer term of 1987, it was decided to amalgamate the boys school and girls school into one unified school. In September 1988, St Paul's Catholic School was formed. The name of the school was to honour the Religious Order that first established Catholic secondary education in this area; the Sisters of Charity of St Paul's. Students from both schools were invited to enter a competition to design the school badge and tie. The winners were Carla James and Michael Brown.

=== Technology College ===
The Department for Education under successive governments endorsed the school's designation as a Technology College. Technology College status reflects the enhanced opportunities in various sectors of these studies. These opportunities arise in various types of applied Design and Technology, or enabled within the theoretical and skill-based studies of the sciences (including mathematics) and the arts. These opportunities, together with the annual adoption of educational innovations, form the cornerstone of the ethos of the school.

In furtherance of its specialisation this school has offered the option of studying an Engineering Diploma course to its pupils since September 2008.

=== Academy ===
Previously a voluntary aided school administered by Surrey County Council, in December 2022 St Paul's converted to academy status. The school is now sponsored by the Ascension Catholic Academy Trust, but continues to be under the jurisdiction of the Roman Catholic Diocese of Westminster.

=== Headteachers ===
- Edmund Kaye 1987–2005 (Note: Left on retirement after 18 years of leadership)
- Simon Uttley 2005–2011 (Note: Successfully applied to become head of larger and then often academically-challenged St John Bosco College, London in a traditionally economically suffering part of Battersea, a position he holds as at 2015.)
- Ceri Bacon 2011–2015
- James Mc Nulty 2016 to present

== Performance ==
The school in 2007–08 achieved an improvement in the proportion of five good A*-C passes of over 20%. Ceri Bacon was appointed to be the Headteacher in 2011 and at the close of that academic year presided over a 94.6% pass rate of five A*-Cs at GCSE level.

Students' attainment in 2010 represented a significant increase compared to previous years. This upward trend, although by a smaller proportion, continued in 2011, so that attainment in English by the end of Year 11 is now above the national average and around the national average in mathematics

— School report by Ofsted, 2011

== Wider ethos and motto ==
=== Provision for prayer and collective worship ===
Prayer and worship underpin the Catholic life of the school so that pupils' spiritual, moral and social development is outstanding.

— S48 Education Act, Additional (Diocesan) Inspection Report, Diocese of Westminster Educational Inspection Officer, 2010

School Prayer

We pray that we follow the teaching of St Paul:
may we always speak the truth;
share with others;
use good words to encourage others;
be understanding and forgiving.
Grant us the strength to meet this challenge.
Amen.

— Based on St Paul's letter to the Ephesians 4:23–30

=== School motto and shield ===
Emblazoned onto the school uniform items is the school motto, DISCE PRODESSE which can rendered into English as: Learn (or study) to profit (improve).

The school's badge is a quartered shield divided into a capital S and P in authentic italic script, open book with quill symbolising the significance contribution St Paul made to the New Testament: thirteen epistles forming the New Testament book of Paul are attributed to St Paul and the sword representing both St Paul's brave eloquence in preaching the Word of God and the manner of his martyrdom: he was beheaded in Rome.

== Alumni ==
- Dave Sisi (b. 1993) – professional rugby union player
- Curtis Langdon (b. 1997) – professional rugby union player
- Caolan Englefield (b. 1999) – professional rugby union player
- Michael Dykes (b. 2002) – professional rugby union player
