= Cameron Bailey (rugby union) =

New Zealand rugby union player (born 1996)

- Born: 21 January 1996 (age 30) New Zealand
- Height: 191 cm (6 ft 3 in)
- Weight: 100 kg (220 lb; 15 st 10 lb)
- School: St Andrew’s College

Rugby union career
- Position: Wing / Fullback
- Current team: Shimizu Blue Sharks
Senior career
Years	Team	Apps	(Points)
2016–2021	South Canterbury	8	(20)
2021	Canterbury	4	(0)
2021–2025	Kamaishi Seawaves	30	(51)
2025–	Shimizu Blue Sharks	13	(30)
- Correct as of 17 September 2021

Cameron Bailey (born 21 January 1996 in New Zealand) is a New Zealand rugby union player for Canterbury. His playing position is wing or fullback. He was announced in the Canterbury squad for the 2021 season.

At junior level, Bailey also represented New Zealand at Australian rules football and bowls.
