= Eve Christine Gadzikwa =

Zimbabwean businesswoman

- Born: 24 December 1964 (age 61); Marondera, Zimbabwe
- Education: St. John's High School; IMM Graduate School
- Occupations: Businesswoman; author
- Spouse: Celestine Gadzikwa (divorced)
- Children: 2

Eve Christine Gadzikwa (née Mandaza; born 24 December 1964) is a Zimbabwean businesswoman and entrepreneur. With a career spanning over 25 years in the public and private sectors, Gadzikwa has served as Director General and Secretary to the Standards Association of Zimbabwe since September 2008. She is also a qualified microbiologist and a fellow of the Institute of Medical Laboratory and Clinical Scientist Council of Zimbabwe and the Marketing Association of Zimbabwe. She was previously the 13th and first female president of the African Organisation for Standardisation from 2016 to 2019.

== Early life and education ==
Eve Christine Mandaza was the third of four children of Joel and Grace Mandaza. She was born on December 24, 1964 at Marondera village in Zimbabwe. Her parents moved to Zambia, where her father worked as a miner in the Nchanga Copper Mines of Chingola and her mother was a registered mid-wife and nurse.

Mandaza attended her primary education at Hellen Waller School and early secondary schooling Fatima Girls High in Ndola, Zambia where she became a fluent speaker of the Bemba language. In 1978, at the age of 15 years, she returned to Zimbabwe where she attended St. John's High School, a catholic boarding school in Harare where she studied biology. She obtained a Marketing Management Diploma from the IMM Graduate School in South Africa (IMM SA). In 2004 she graduated with a master's degree in business from the University of Nottingham.

== Career ==
In September 2008, Gadzikwa was appointed to her present position of Director General and Secretary to the Standards Association of Zimbabwe. She spent 3 years as a consultant within Africa, visiting Kenya, Namibia, Lesotho, Ghana and the United States, where she spent her earlier career working with medical testing and public health laboratories. Prior to joining Standards Association of Zimbabwe, she spent 6 years at the Zimbabwe National Quality Assurance Trust, a national proficiency testing organization where she was executive director.

Gadzikwa is the leader of the Standards Association of Zimbabwe (SAZ) and past chairperson for the Zimbabwe Stock Exchange (ZSE) board and Institute of Directors of Zimbabwe (IODZ). Gadzikwa is the first woman in Zimbabwe to head the ZSE, IODZ and SAZ simultaneously.

Gadzikwa has previously served as board chairperson of the Zimbabwe Stock Exchange and the Institute of Directors Zimbabwe (IoDZ).

== Personal life ==
Gadzikwa was previously married to Celestine Gadzikwa, a Zimbabwean businessman with whom she has two children. They are now divorced.

== Leadership positions ==
=== Current ===
- Director General of the Standards Association of Zimbabwe
- Non-Executive Director of BancABC
- Vice chairman of the Slice Distributors Board
- Chair of standards and business ethics at the Confederation of Zimbabwe Industries Committee
- Chairman's Advisory Committee member at ISO DEVCO
- Member of Gwanda University Council

=== Past ===
- President of the African Organisation for Standardisation (June 2016 – June 2019)
- Chair of the Institute of Directors Zimbabwe (2010 – 2015)
- Chair of the Zimbabwe Stock Exchange (2010 – 2015)
- Board member at SADCAS (2009 – 2015)
- Executive Director of the ZINQAP Trust

== Publications ==
- I Dare you to Lead
