= Jake Woolmore =

English rugby union player (born 1990)

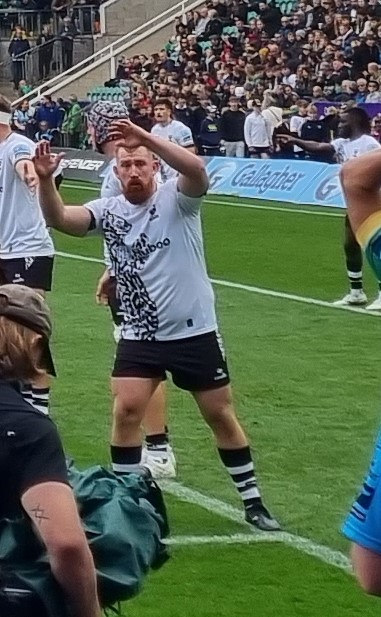
- Jake Woolmore in 2023 English Premiership Northampton Saints vs Bristol Bears
- Born: Jake Curtis Woolmore; 7 December 1990 (age 35) Hammersmith, England
- Height: 1.85 m (6 ft 1 in)
- Weight: 120 kg (18 st 13 lb)

Rugby union career
- Position: Prop
- Current team: Bristol Bears
Senior career
Years	Team	Apps	(Points)
2014–2016	Exeter Chiefs	1	(0)
2016–2018	Jersey Reds	49	(0)
2018–	Bristol Bears	58	(0)
- Correct as of 25 January 2021

Jake Woolmore (born 7 December 1990) is an English rugby union player who plays for Bristol Bears in the Premiership Rugby. His main position is loosehead prop.

Woolmore joined Exeter Chiefs in the summer of 2015, appearing in the A League and the Anglo-Welsh Cup, and also featured as a dual-registered player for former club Taunton Titans. Woolmore joined Jersey Reds in the RFU Championship as an emergency front-cover due to injuries before becoming a permanent deal from the 2016–17 season.

On 9 March 2018, Woolmore made his return to the Premiership with Bristol Bears ahead of the 2018–19 season.
