= Lovejoy Chawatama =

Zimbabwean rugby union player

- Full name: Lovejoy Tinotenda Chawatama
- Born: 26 August 1992 (age 34) Harare, Zimbabwe
- Height: 179 cm (5 ft 10 in)
- Weight: 116 kg (256 lb; 18 st 4 lb)
- University: University of West England

Rugby union career
- Position: Tighthead Prop
- Current team: Harlequins
Youth career
- 2007-2010: Beckenham RFC
Senior career
Years	Team	Apps	(Points)
2010-2012	Beckenham RFC	??	(??)
2012-2014	Bridgwater & Albion	??	(??)
2014-2015	London Scottish	4	(0)
2014-2015	→Clifton (loan)	12	(0)
2015-2016	Rosslyn Park	28	(5)
2016-2017	London Welsh	10	(0)
2017-2023	London Irish	94	(15)
2023-2024	Harlequins	7	(0)
2024-	Bristol Bears	4	(0)
- Correct as of 6 April 2025
International career
Years	Team	Apps	(Points)
2012	Kent under-20	??	(??)
2014	England Students	4	(0)
- Correct as of 6 April 2025

Lovejoy Tinotenda Chawatama (26 August 1992) is a Zimbabwean rugby union player who plays for Bristol Bears in the Premiership Rugby competition.

== Club career ==
=== Beckenham RFC ===
Moving to England at 15 from Zimbabwe, Chawatama joined his local club Beckenham RFC where he was mentored by former Wasps player Dan Leek.

=== Bridgwater & Albion RFC ===
He joined Bridgwater & Albion after being convinced by his university coach ex-England tighthead Darren Crompton who was also coaching down there. At the time he was playing as a back-rower but he was told his height would prevent him from reaching the highest level of the game and that a move to the front row was the only way to fulfil his aspirations.

=== London Scottish F.C. ===
He joined London Scottish 2014, making his debut against Jersey Reds coming off the bench.

=== Clifton ===
While at London Scottish, he went on loan to Clifton to get more game time.

=== London Welsh ===
He joined rival Championship side London Welsh, however after only 10 matches he left mid-season to join London Irish.

=== London Irish ===
Joining London Irish during the 2016-17 season he went on to win promotion with the Sunbury-on-Thames side to the Premiership. During the 2020-21 season, Chawatama reached the 50-appearance milestone for London Irish as he enjoyed a stellar season in the green jersey, making 18 appearances in all competitions.

In 2023 London Irish was suspended from the Premiership and Premiership Rugby Cup after failing to prove they have the finances to operate in the 2023/24 campaign.

=== Harlequins ===
Chawatama joined Harlequins before the 2023/24 season after being out of contract from London Irish.

=== Bristol Bears ===
On 3 April 2024, Chawatama would sign for Premiership rivals Bristol Bears from the 2024–25 season.

== Honours ==
=== London Irish ===
- RFU Championship - 2016–17, 2018–19
- Premiership Rugby Cup (runners up) - 2021–22, 2022–23

=== Personal ===
- 2017 Zimbabwe Sports Personality of the Year
