= Siale Piutau =

Tonga international rugby union player

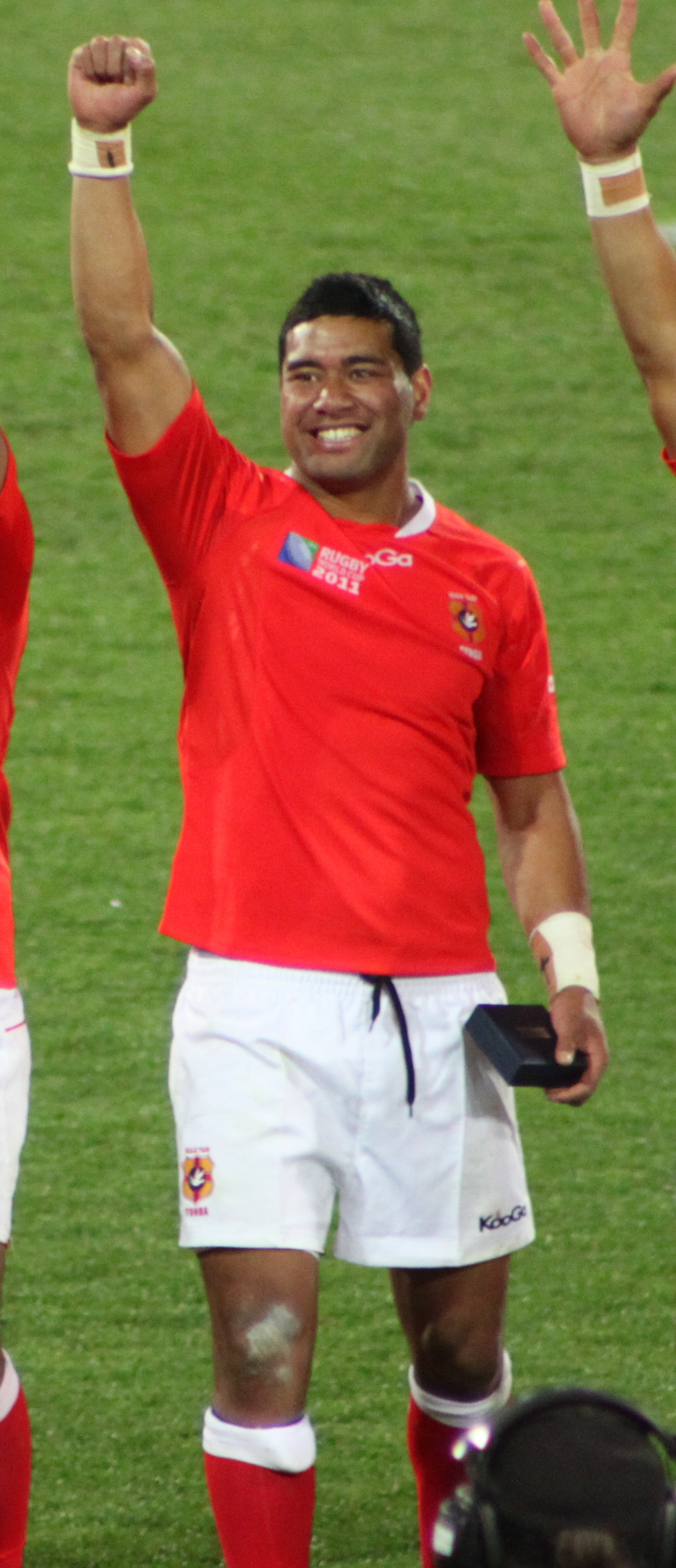
- Piutau in 2011
- Born: Siale Piutau; 13 October 1985 (age 41) Auckland, New Zealand
- Height: 1.85 m (6 ft 1 in)
- Weight: 100 kg (15 st 10 lb)
- School: Wesley College
- Notable relative: Charles Piutau (brother)

Rugby union career
- Position: Centre
- Current team: Shimizu Koto Blue Sharks
Senior career
Years	Team	Apps	(Points)
2012–2016	Yamaha Júbilo	55	(85)
2016	Wasps	12	(5)
2017−2021	Bristol Bears	66	(10)
2021–	Shimizu Koto Blue Sharks	22	(5)
- Correct as of 8 August 2023
Provincial / State sides
Years	Team	Apps	(Points)
2006–2011	Counties Manukau	50	(35)
- Correct as of 3 August 2011
Super Rugby
Years	Team	Apps	(Points)
2010	Chiefs	1	(0)
2011–2012	Highlanders	19	(15)
- Correct as of 6 July 2012
International career
Years	Team	Apps	(Points)
2011–2019	Tonga	43	(32)
- Correct as of 13 October 2019

Siale Piutau (born 13 October 1985) is a rugby union player who currently plays as a centre for Shimizu Koto Blue Sharks in the Japan Rugby League One. Although born and educated in New Zealand, he represented Tonga internationally from 2011 to 2019, winning 43 caps. Piutau was Tonga's captain for the 2019 Rugby World Cup and retired from international rugby after a win against the USA.

He is the elder brother of New Zealand and Tonga player Charles Piutau.

== Playing career ==
=== Provincial Rugby ===
Piutau joined Counties Manukau during the 2006 Air New Zealand Cup.

Lining up next to former All Black Tana Umaga in midfield, Piutau was in the 2010 ITM Cup for the Steelers. He started every game for Counties, and was one of the club's top performers over the course of the season. As a reward for his efforts, he was named the 2010 Counties Manukau Player of the Year.

=== Super Rugby ===
Piutau was included in the Chiefs Wider Training Group for the 2010 Super 14 season, and made his Super Rugby debut as a substitute late in the season after a rash of injuries hit the Chiefs backs.

For the 2011 Super 15 season, Piutau was signed by the Highlanders and emerged as a key squad member, making 13 starts and scoring 3 tries. In 2012, he was limited by injuries and made only 5 appearances. Following the season, he left New Zealand to sign in Japan.

=== Japan ===
For the 2012–13 season, Piutau signed with Yamaha Jubilo of the Top League in Japan.

=== English Rugby ===
Wasps

He signed for Wasps RFC on 4 February 2016 for the remainder of the 2015/2016 season. He made his debut in the 64–23 victory over Saracens F.C. on 14 February 2016. After returning from his loan spell at Wasps, Piutau returned to Japan, and Yamaha Jubilo.

Bristol

Piutau signed for Bristol in the Greene King IPA Championship, initially on a short-term deal, which was later extended to a permanent contract, in December 2016.

Piutau became a regular starter at Centre and was known for his on and off field leadership. He played 66 times for Bristol and was present for the Bears' promotion to the Premiership in 2018 and in the successful European Challenge cup campaign in 2020. Piutau announced that he would leave Bristol at the conclusion of the 2020/2021 season.

=== Return to Japan ===
On 7 June 2021, Piutau left Bristol in England at the end of the 2020-21 season, as he returned to Japan to sign for Shimizu Koto Blue Sharks in the Japan Rugby League One competition.

=== International career ===
Piutau has 43 international caps for Tonga and this includes 19 as captain. His first cap was in the 2011 27-12 defeat against Fiji where he made his debut off the bench. His final game for Tonga was in the 31-19 victory in the Rugby World Cup pool C match against the USA in which Piutau scored a try and a later conversion. His final figures in his international career were 6 tries, 1 conversion totalling 32 points.
