= Michael Dykes =

English rugby union player

- Born: Michael Dykes Amelia Day (Wife); 3 January 2002 (age 24)
- Height: 1.82 m (6 ft 0 in)
- Weight: 90 kg (14 st 2 lb)
- School: St Paul’s Catholic School

Rugby union career
- Position: Wing
- Current team: Gloucester
Senior career
Years	Team	Apps	(Points)
2020–2023	London Irish	10	(20)
2023–	Gloucester	0	(0)
- Correct as of 16 August 2023

Michael Dykes (born 3 January 2002) is an English rugby union player who plays for Gloucester Rugby as a winger.

== Early life ==
Dykes is from Berkshire. He represented England at age-group level rugby union as well as playing for Bracknell RFC and Maidenhead, and begun playing for the London Irish academy from thirteen years-old. He attended St Paul’s Catholic College with whom he won the AASE Schools title, defeating Beechen Cliff School of Bath in the final. He was promoted to the London Irish senior academy ahead of the 2020-21 season.

== Career ==
=== London Irish ===
Dykes made his senior debut during the 2021-2022 season, away at the Leicester Tigers in the Premiership Rugby Cup. The following season he scored a hat-trick in that competition away at Saracens RFC.

Dykes scored a hat-trick on his Rugby Premiership debut for London Irish against Harlequins RFC in January 2023. He was just the third player to score a hat trick on debut in the competition, after Lesley Vainikolo and Courtnall Skosan.

=== Gloucester ===
In June 2023 Dykes was announced to be joining Gloucester Rugby.
