= Waddilove High School =

High school in Zimbabwe

Location
- Marondera; Zimbabwe

Information
- Religious affiliation(s): Methodism
- Established: 1891; 134 years ago
- Founder: John White

Waddilove High School is a Methodist High School in Marondera, Mashonaland East Province, Zimbabwe, established in 1891 by Methodist Missionary John White. The name Waddilove was in honour of Sir Joshua K Waddilove, an Englishman, philanthropist and founder of Provident Financial, who bequeathed 1,000 English pounds which resulted in the construction of two dormitory complexes for boys and girls. The school transformed from a Mission Station to Teacher Training College. The school is situated close to Muti Usinazita. Some of the past headmasters are B. T. Chakanyuka, Gwanzura, Munongi, Murefu, Moyo and Manhera. The school has produced many learners with more than 15 points. In 2022, it had high pass rate of more than 27 learners, which is higher than a standard advanced level class.

== Alumni ==
Several Waddilove alumni were included as ministers in the first cabinet of the independent Zimbabwe in 1980:

- Stanlake Samkange
- Sydney Sekeramayi
- Herbert Ushewokunze
- Eddison Zvobgo
- Charles Mhlauri

== See also ==
- List of secondary schools in Mashonaland East
