= Charlie Powell (rugby union) =

English rugby union player

- Born: Charles James Powell; 29 October 1999 (age 27) Bristol, England
- Height: 1.81 m (5 ft 11 in)
- Weight: 93 kg (14 st 9 lb)
- School: Bristol Grammar School

Rugby union career
- Position(s): Centre, Wing
- Current team: Otago
Senior career
Years	Team	Apps	(Points)
2018-2022	Bristol Bears	17	(15)
2022-2023	Jersey Reds	14	(5)
2023–2024	Hartpury University	5	(0)
2024	Southland	8	(15)
2025	Otago	5	(0)
2026	Bristol Bears		
- Correct as of 14 October 2025

Charlie Powell (born 29 October 1999) is an English rugby union player who plays for Bristol Bears in the English Premiership.
