= Paul Hull =

England international rugby union player

- Born: Paul Anthony Hull; 17 May 1968 (age 58) Lambeth, England

Rugby union career
- Position: Full back
International career
| Years | Team | Apps | (Points) |
| 1994 | England | 4 | (0) |

Paul Anthony Hull (born 17 May 1968) is an English former rugby union international full back.

He was head coach of Bristol between February 2009 and May 2011 and returned to the club in November 2013 to work as Chief Scout for two years. He is still involved in rugby as a Citing Officer working for the RFU and World Rugby.

Formerly a Housemaster and Director of Rugby at Prior Park College, Bath, he took up an appointment as the RFU's Head of Professional Game Match Officials at the end of the academic year 2020/21.
