= Matt Postlethwaite =

English rugby union player

- Full name: Matthew Postlethwaite
- Born: 1 October 1996 (age 30) Steeton, West Yorkshire, England
- Height: 194 cm (6 ft 4 in)
- Weight: 116 kg (256 lb; 18 st 4 lb)
- School: Ilkley Grammar School

Rugby union career
- Position: Lock
Youth career
- 2001–2015: Ilkley RFC
- Yorkshire Carnegie Academy
- 2015–2017: Sale Sharks
Senior career
Years	Team	Apps	(Points)
2015–2020	Sale FC	77	(40)
2017–2023	Sale Sharks	62	(15)
2017–2018	→ Fylde RFC (loan)	3	(0)
2017–2018	→ Rotherham Titans (loan)	13	(0)
2019–2020	→ Doncaster Knights (loan)	1	(0)
2023–2024	Exeter Chiefs	3	(5)
2015–2024	Total	159	(60)
- Correct as of 18 December 2023
International career
Years	Team	Apps	(Points)
2010	Yorkshire Under-15	-	(-)
2014	Yorkshire Under-18	-	(-)
2015	England Under-18	1	(0)
- Correct as of 18 December 2023

Matt Postlethwaite (born 1 October 1996) is an English former rugby union player who played as a Lock.

== Career ==
Postlethwaite started playing rugby at the age of five with local club Ilkley RFC. He represented Yorkshire at County youth level and in February 2015 played for England under-18 against France.

Postlethwaite captained Sale Sharks academy side. He spent six seasons with Sale and played in their 2018–19 European Rugby Challenge Cup semi-final elimination against La Rochelle.

In the summer of 2023 Postlethwaite left Sale to join Exeter Chiefs. In May 2024 after making only three appearances for Exeter in the Premiership Rugby Cup Postlethwaite was forced to retire on medical grounds.
