= Beltus Nonleh =

Cameroonian rugby union player

- Full name: Beltus Nonleh
- Born: 15 November 2000 (age 25) Cameroon
- Height: 185 cm (6 ft 1 in)
- Weight: 124 kg (273 lb; 19 st 7 lb)
- School: St Cuthbert's High School

Rugby union career
- Position: Prop
- Current team: Northampton Saints
Youth career
- 2011-2018: Rochdale
Senior career
Years	Team	Apps	(Points)
2018-2020	Rochdale	22	(0)
2021-2023	Sedgley Park	33	(0)
2023-	Northampton Saints	2	(0)
2023	→ Leicester Lions (loan)	6	(0)
2023-2024	→ Cambridge (loan)	2	(0)
2024	→ Nottingham (loan)	5	(5)
2024-2025	→ Bedford Blues (loan)	12	(0)
2025-	Sedgley Park	8	(0)
- Correct as of 19 March 2025
International career
Years	Team	Apps	(Points)
2018	Lancashire under-18	1	(0)

Beltus Nonleh (born 15 November 2000) is a Cameroonian rugby union player who plays as a prop for Northampton Saints in the Premiership.

== Career ==
Nonleh moved to Rochdale in 2008 from Cameroon, going on to join Rochdale under-12s in 2011. He went up through the junior set up before playing 2 seasons at senior level.

On 8 December 2018, while at Rochdale he was selected by Lancashire under-18 coming off the bench at half time in the 34–20 win over Cheshire under-18.

He was picked up in 2021 by Sedgley Park, going on to win National League 2 North in 2023. He was named National League Two North tight-head of the season.

In 2023 he was signed by Premiership side Northampton Saints. Northampton's Director of Rugby Phil Dowson described him as a "rough diamond" who has "all the tools he needs to succeed at the top table of English rugby".

When he joined the club he was unable to train due to having to have an operation on his foot. He returned to playing in National One featuring for Leicester Lions, before moving up to Championship level playing for Cambridge, Nottingham and Bedford. He went on to make his Northampton Saints debut in the 2024-25 Premiership Rugby Cup, coming off the bench in a 50–23 win over Coventry.

He was voted the Northampton Saints' Cinch Player of the Month for February, after strong performances away on loan at Nottingham.
