= Chris Vui =

Samoa international rugby union player

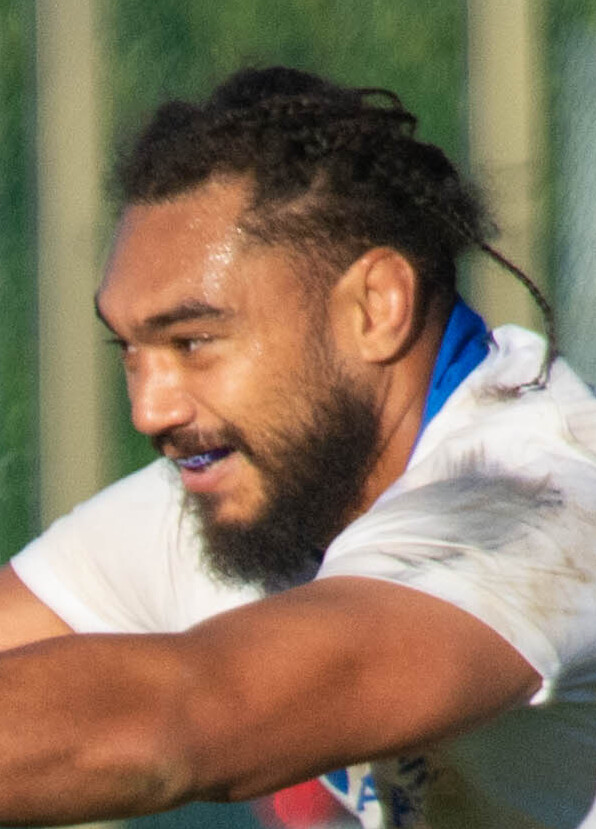
- Full name: Christopher Fatu Vui
- Born: 11 February 1993 (age 33) Auckland, New Zealand
- Height: 1.97 m (6 ft 6 in)
- Weight: 120 kg (265 lb; 18 st 13 lb)
- School: Massey High School

Rugby union career
- Position(s): Lock, Flanker
- Current team: Bristol Bears
Senior career
Years	Team	Apps	(Points)
2015	Blues	2	(0)
2015−2016	North Harbour	20	(10)
2016–2017	Worcester Warriors	8	(0)
2017–	Bristol Bears	118	(50)
- Correct as of 28 August 2023
International career
Years	Team	Apps	(Points)
2013	New Zealand U20	4	(0)
2016–	Samoa	27	(5)
- Correct as of 28 August 2023

Christopher Fatu Vui (born 11 February 1993) is a professional rugby union player who plays as a lock for Premiership Rugby club Bristol Bears. Born in New Zealand, he represents Samoa at international level after qualifying on ancestry grounds.

== Club career ==
During the 2015 Super Rugby season he made 2 appearances for the Auckland-based Blues franchise.

Vui played for Worcester Warriors. He moved to Bristol ahead of the 2017/18 season.

In April 2025, Vui was issued with a four-year ban by World Rugby backdated to September 2023 for an anti-doping rule violation after testing positive for nandrolone, although this decision was not publicly known until July 2026 when his appeal to the Court of Arbitration for Sport was announced as unsuccessful. The ban explained Vui's absence from professional rugby as the ruling revealed he had been under a provisional suspension due to the failed test since September 2023.

== International career ==
He represented New Zealand Under 20 in the 2013 IRB Junior World Championship in France.

He earned his first cap for Samoa during the 2016 November internationals. Vui became the youngest captain in World Rugby when he skippered Samoa in 2017.
