= Luke Green (rugby union) =

English rugby union player (born 2001)

- Full name: Luke Green
- Born: 6 May 2001 (age 25) Richmond, England
- Height: 188 cm (6 ft 2 in)
- Weight: 115 kg (254 lb; 18 st 2 lb)

Rugby union career
- Position: Tight-head Prop
- Current team: Northampton Saints
Youth career
- Richmond
- Rosslyn Park
- London Irish Amateurs
Senior career
Years	Team	Apps	(Points)
2020–2023	London Irish	8	(0)
2019–2021	→ Richmond (loan)	9	(0)
2022–2023	→ Ampthill (loan)	9	
2023–2024	San Diego Legion	24	(0)
2024–	Northampton Saints	30	(5)
- Correct as of 25 May 2025
2019	England Under-18	5	(0)
2020–2021	England Under-20	8	(0)
2025–	England A	1	(0)
- Correct as of 23 February 2025

Luke Green (born 6 May 2001) is an English professional rugby union player who plays as a prop for Premiership Rugby club Northampton Saints. He previously played for England at Under-18 and Under-20 as well as London Irish before their collapse.

== Club career ==
Green began playing rugby at Richmond at age six before joining rival side Rosslyn Park, later ending up at London Irish Amateurs. As a youth he played and captained the Middlesex county side. Green joined the London Irish Academy at 15, although not joining the senior academy until 2021 he made his senior debut in 2020, in the first round of the 2020-21 EPCR Challenge Cup, coming off the bench against SU Agen.

Green played on loan at Richmond helping them gain promotion to the RFU Championship and Ampthill. He also competed for San Diego Legion where he started in the 2023 Major League Rugby final against the New England Feejacks. With the collapse of London Irish ahead of the 2023–24 season Green joined his former loan side Ampthill playing five games, before moving stateside and joining San Diego Legion.

In May 2024 Green was signed by Northampton Saints for the 2024–25 season.

== International career ==
In 2019 Green played for England under-18 and the following year saw him make his debut for England under-20 during the 2020 U20 Six Nations. He featured in all five of their matches in the 2021 junior Six Nations winning the Grand Slam at Cardiff Arms Park.

In February 2025 Green played for England A in a victory over Ireland Wolfhounds.

== Honours ==
=== England Under-20 ===
- Six Nations Under 20s Championship
  - Champions: (1) 2021
  - Grand Slam: (1) 2021

=== Richmond ===
- National League One
  - Champions: (1) 2019-20

=== London Irish ===
- Premiership Rugby Cup
  - Runners-up: (2) 2021-22, 2022-23

=== San Diego Legion ===
- Major League Rugby
  - Runners-up: (1) 2023
