= Bristol Bears =

English rugby union football club

(England) Bristol Bears
- Full name: Bristol Rugby Club
- Nickname(s): Bears, Bris
- Founded: 1888; 138 years ago
- Location: Bristol, England
- Ground: Ashton Gate Stadium (Capacity: 27,000)
- Chairman: Chris Booy
- Director of Rugby: Pat Lam
- Captain: Fitz Harding
- Most appearances: Jake Woolmore (192)
- Top scorer: Felipe Contepomi (573)
- Most tries: Harry Thacker (60)
- League: PREM Rugby
- 2025–26: 6th of 10
1st kit	2nd kit

Official website
- www.bristolbearsrugby.com

Bristol Bears (officially Bristol Rugby Club or Bristol Rugby) are a professional men's rugby union club based in Bristol, England. They play in the Gallagher PREM, England's top division of rugby.

The club was founded as "Bristol Football Club" in 1888; between 1921 and 2014, home matches were played at the Memorial Ground, and have since been played at Ashton Gate Stadium in the south-west of the city. The current head coach Pat Lam was appointed in 2017. In the 2024–25 season Bristol finished 4th, losing in the play off semi-finals, entitling them to compete in the 2025-26 European Rugby Champions Cup.

In 2018, the club rebranded as "Bristol Bears"; between 2001 and 2005 the club were known as "Bristol Shoguns" due to a sponsorship deal with Mitsubishi.

Bristol won the 1983 John Player Cup and have also won England's second division four times, most recently in 2017–18. In 2019–2020, Bristol won The European Challenge Cup for the first time.

== History ==
=== Formation and early history ===
Bristol Football Club was formed in 1888 when the Carlton club merged with rival club Redland Park to create a united Bristol team. Westbury Park having refused to merge then folded and many of its players subsequently joined Bristol. The County Cricket Ground at Nevil Road was leased for home matches.

The first match was a heavy away defeat to Cardiff and although the first season was relatively successful the second was not with only three games won. The club went from strength to strength over the next few years under the captaincy of W. Tommy Thomson. It turned the corner and in 1891–92, now wearing the more familiar navy and white hooped shirts, the Bristol team won 20 games out of 24.

Over the ensuing seasons the fixture list went from strength to strength, consisting of most of the top English and Welsh sides. In 1900 J. W. Jarman became Bristol's first England cap. Two major touring sides played Bristol during this period. The first New Zealand All Blacks defeated the club 41–0 in 1905 and in 1909 a combined Bristol and Clifton RFC team, captained by Percy Down, lost to Australia 11–3.

=== World Wars ===
The club was beginning to bring on a new generation of players when the First World War halted all rugby. After the war a Bristol United side was formed to provide rugby for returning servicemen and this led to the rebirth of Bristol in 1919. The County Ground was no longer available for home games so the club rented a field at Radnor Road, Horfield although occasional matches were staged at the Bristol City and Bristol Rovers grounds. The Radnor Road seasons were good ones for the club and a new crop of stars appeared.

The Memorial Ground stadium was built on an area of land called Buffalo Bill's Field which was previously occupied by allotments in 1921. Bristol defeated Cardiff 19–3 in the opening match in front of a large crowd.

The fiftieth anniversary was celebrated in 1938 but the next few years saw a fall in performances and the final inter-war season was a poor one. During World War II a Bristol Supporters team kept rugby union going in the city. Thus Bristol had readily available players when peacetime rugby union resumed in 1945.

=== 1950s ===
The playing record in the early fifties was mixed, but there was a huge improvement under the captaincy of first Bert MacDonald, and then Dick Hawkes. Records were broken in 1956–57 and even better was to follow in what has been called 'The Blake Era'.

Fly half John Blake became captain in 1957 and under his leadership the club developed an entertaining running style of rugby involving backs and forwards, which was years ahead of its time. The Bristol club set and broke new records for wins in a season and points scored and goal kicking forward Gordon Cripps rewrote the individual points scoring records.

=== 1960s–1980s ===
The 75th anniversary was celebrated in 1962–63 and floodlights were installed in the following season. Club form peaked in 1965–66 under Derek Neate's captaincy when 39 games were won, and again in 1971–72 under Tony Nicholls. This was the club's best ever season with a thousand points being scored for the first time and the team being crowned unofficial English and Anglo-Welsh champions.

Under Mike Rafter's captaincy, the club won the John Player Cup in 1983, defeating Leicester 28–22. During this period Alan Morley established a world record of 479 tries in senior rugby. The centenary season with Nigel Pomphrey as captain was celebrated in style with a game against the Barbarians and a narrow defeat in the cup final.

=== 1990s ===
In 1996, Bristol Rovers moved into the Memorial Stadium as tenants of Bristol Rugby, and later took over ownership of the stadium through the Memorial Stadium Company.

1998–99 (Premiership Two)
Relegation to Premiership Two in 1998 was not the worst of Bristol's problems. Only an eleventh hour rescue by Malcolm Pearce saved the club from potential oblivion. Bristol also lost control of the Memorial Stadium Company to Bristol Rovers and were tenants thereafter until their eventual departure from the stadium at the conclusion of the 2013–14 season. Bristol's first season outside the top flight brought with it a number of first-time visits to clubs. Bristol went on to win the Premiership Two title and promotion back to Premiership One, sealing the win with a 22–11 victory over Worcester.

=== 2000s ===
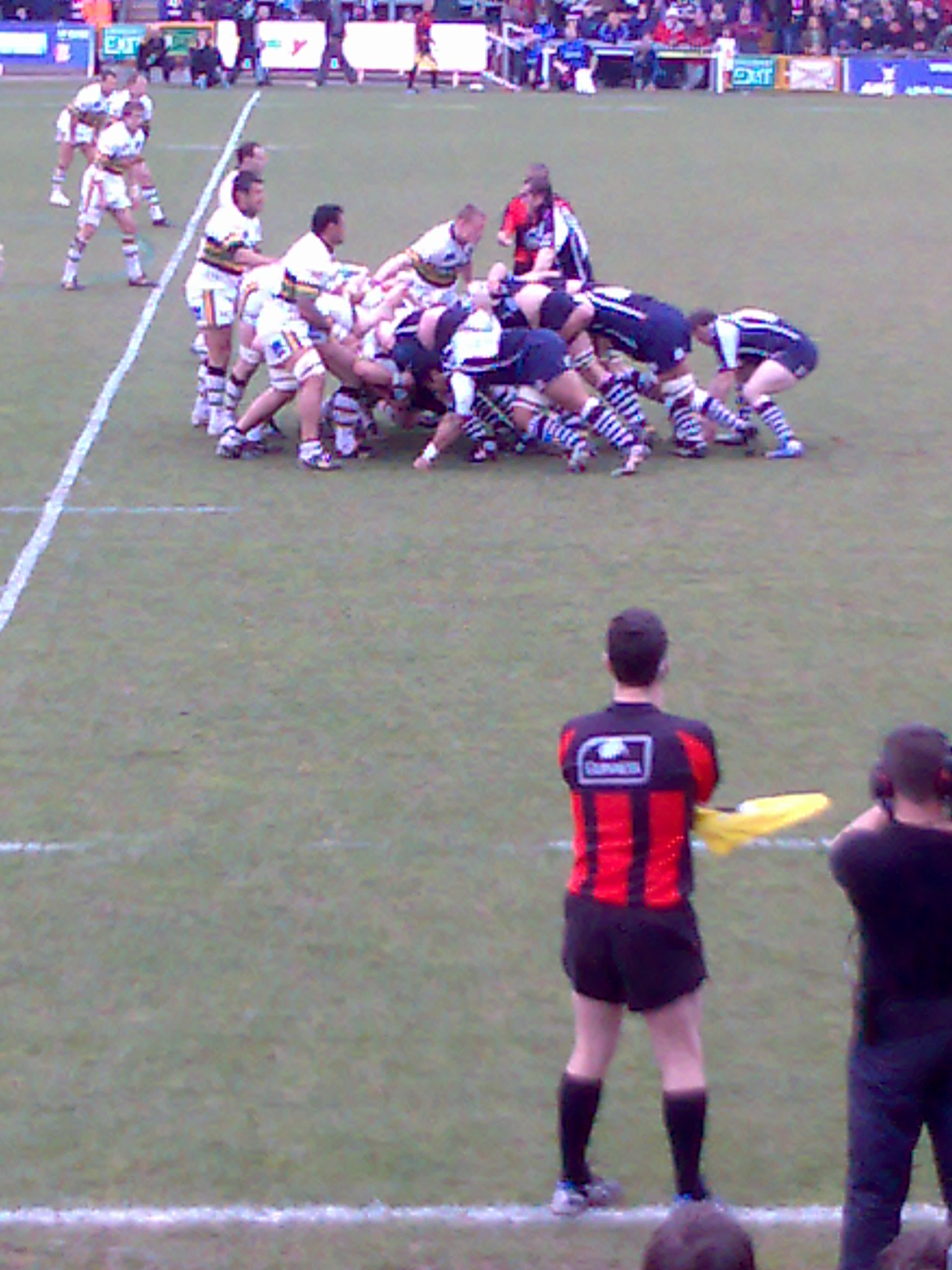
Bristol playing Northampton during the 2007–08 Premiership.

The World Cup disrupted the early part of the 1999–00 season, with a number of players missing the first few games. Under the captaincy of Dean Ryan the team finished sixth, just missing out on European Cup qualification. At the end of the season Dean Ryan took over as head coach from Bob Dwyer. After an opening day victory over newly promoted Rotherham, Bristol had a disappointing 2000–01 season finishing ninth. Off the field, Jack Rowell became managing director, and successful community initiatives saw the attendance figures rise. Chief Executive Nicholas de Scossa was involved in debates about top clubs separating from the Rugby Football Union and forming a new Premier League.

The 2001–02 season brought a new name, Bristol Shoguns, following a five-year £2-million sponsorship deal with Mitsubishi Motors. The Shoguns finishing the season with the most bonus points in the Zurich Premiership, three players in the top try scorers chart, a place at Twickenham in the final of the play-offs (the year before winning the play-offs constituted winning the English title), and also a place in the Heineken Cup for the 2002–03 season. In the close season head coach Dean Ryan moved to Gloucester, Jack Rowell resigned as Director of Rugby whilst skipper Jason Little retired. Peter Thorburn took over as coach. League results were mixed, but there were more wins than defeats including a first ever league win away at Bath. At Christmas 2002 owner Malcolm Pearce announced that he would quit at the end of the season. Rumours circulated that Bristol could be sold to Firoz Kassam and play out of Oxford, and a merger with rivals Bath had been mooted. Neither event came to pass, but Bristol were relegated at the end of the season as off-field distractions took their toll.

Before the start of the 2003–04 season Martin Haag and a week later Richard Hill joined as first team coach and head coach respectively. While the board were raising money to stabilise the club Haag and Hill implemented a 'three-year plan' to rebuild Bristol and put them back in the Premiership. They won National League One the following year and were promoted.

The club's deal with Mitsubishi expired in July 2005, and the club started 2005–06 in the Premiership as Bristol RFC. Bristol elected to play two 2006–07 Guinness Premiership games at Ashton Gate, home of football side Bristol City. The local derby against Bath and the game against Leicester were moved from the 11,750 capacity Memorial Stadium to Ashton Gate's 21,500 capacity to allow more fans the chance to watch the team. The precedent for this was established for a crucial relegation fixture against Bath in May 2003. Bristol finished third in the league, securing a Heineken Cup place for only the second time, and then reached the semi-finals of the play-offs, losing 26–14 at Leicester. Martin Haag was released as Bristol's forwards coach in June 2007 and replaced by John Brain.

Bristol could not replicate the success of the previous season and ended the 2007–08 season in 9th place. They also failed to progress from their Heineken Cup group, despite a home win against Stade Français Paris. The following season Bristol struggled, winning only two games, and were relegated from the premiership. Richard Hill stepped down as coach in February 2009, with two months and eight games of the season remaining. Paul Hull took over as Bristol's head coach.

=== 2010–2015 ===
Following a failed attempt to immediately return to the Premiership, losing to Exeter Chiefs in the final of the play-offs, a number of first team players quit the club and financial pressures caused significant worries at the club once more. With a more modest squad of players, Bristol struggled to find winning form in the 2010–11 season finishing eighth in the championship and failing to reach the playoff finals. In 2011, following a lack of success Paul Hull in mutual agreement with club left Bristol Rugby and was replaced by academy coach Liam Middleton. In Middleton's first full season in charge Bristol finished top of the championship table but failed to progress to the play-off finals, losing to Cornish Pirates in the semi-finals. From the 2008–09 season businessman Stephen Lansdown financed Bristol Rugby, this only became public knowledge when Lansdown formalised his ownership of the club in 2012.

In the 2012–13 season Bristol missed out on the play-off finals, finishing fifth in the championship. At the end of the 2012–13 season it was announced that former Ospreys head coach Sean Holley would join Bristol Rugby as the first team coach. Andy Robinson joined Bristol Rugby as director of rugby in March 2013, at first working with head coach Liam Middleton but following a poor run of results Middleton was sacked by the club following an internal review later in March 2013.

The 2013–14 season brought a return to form with Bristol Rugby finishing top of the championship table. However, Bristol failed to secure promotion to the premiership, losing both legs of the play-off finals to London Welsh. In the close season a number of players were signed to the club in expectation of promotion for the 2014–15 season, including Samoan Internationals Anthony Perenise Jack Lam & David Lemi, Welsh internationals Matthew Morgan, Ian Evans, Ryan Jones and Dwayne Peel and Wing George Watkins return from Cardiff Blues mid season. Further signings for the 2014–15 season would feature Gareth Maule, Jack O'Connell, Darren Hudson and Gavin Henson.

Bristol Rugby moved from the Memorial Stadium to Ashton Gate Stadium, the home of Bristol City Football Club. Ashton Gate Stadium had a capacity of 21,497. In the run-in to the end of season play-off's the club signed high-profile players in Hooker Ross McMillan, Italian Centre Tommaso Benvenuti and Welsh international Gavin Henson. End of the season saw the departure of Forwards Coach Danny Wilson to Cardiff Blues. The Club again failed to earn promotion to the Premiership for the 2015–16 season losing by one point to Worcester Warriors in the Play-off Finals. At the end of the season Wales international fly half Nicky Robinson leaves the club to take up a fresh challenge in France with Oyonnax.

=== 2015–2018 ===
Much of the squad from the previous season remained with Andy Robinson bolstering his options for the new campaign by signing ex-England winger Tom Varndell. On 4 February it was announced that New Zealander Mark Bakewell would replace Borthwick. The new year saw the announcement that Matthew Morgan to further his international chances was to be leaving the club at the end of the season and joining Danny Wilson at Cardiff Blues. However, Bristol were able to clinch promotion to Aviva Premiership with a 60–47 aggregate win over Doncaster.

February 2016 saw the signing of Wales International scrum half Rhodri Williams from Scarlets for the 2016–17 season. Tusi Pisi signed for the club from Japan's Sunwolves Super Rugby franchise in March. Head coach Sean Holley resigned from his position at the club. Former Welsh internationals Jonathan Thomas appointed as first team defence coach and Dwayne Peel as backs and skills coach. Further signings include USA international centre Thretton Palamo from Saracens and Tongan international prop Soane Tongaʻuiha from French side Oyonnax.

November 2016 saw the sacking of Director of Rugby Andy Robinson due to poor results and 'lost confidence' from the board. Club stalwart and top points scorer Mark Tainton was appointed interim head coach for the remainder of the season. Further signings announced by club included Siale Piutau from Yamaha Jubio, Irish international lock forward Dan Tuohy, All Black international scrum half Alby Mathewson and Shane Geraghty from London Irish.

On New Year's Day, 2017, Varndell equalled Mark Cueto's premiership tries record of 90 tries by scoring against Sale Sharks. This followed a hat-trick in the previous week against Worcester Warriors. On 10 February Varndell became the leading try scorer in the Aviva Premiership when he scored against Harlequins at Ashton Gate.

Ultimately, Bristol finished bottom of the Premiership in their returning year, having been relegated with 2 weeks to go after a 21–36 loss against Wasps at Ashton Gate. They finished 12th with only 3 wins and 20 accumulated points, 13 behind 11th placed Worcester Warriors. Their three victories involved beating Worcester 28–20 at Ashton Gate, beating Sale 23–24 at the AJ Bell, and dramatically defeating longstanding rivals Bath Rugby 12–11 at home. Following their relegation, several notable signings moved away from the club, including Jason Woodward to Gloucester Rugby and Gavin Henson to Newport Gwent Dragons.

On 5 December 2016, it was announced that Pat Lam would become the new head coach for Bristol Rugby after leaving the Irish province Connacht ahead of the 2017–18 season. Notable signings ahead of the new season were Australian International Luke Morahan from Western Force and All Black Steven Luatua from Blues.

Bristol secured promotion in the 2017-18 RFU Championship with two games to spare on 7 April 2018 and ultimately finished top with only one defeat at the hands of Jersey Reds on 4 March 2018. Bristol finished 20 points ahead of Ealing Trailfinders and a further 15 points ahead of third placed Bedford Blues. The scrapping of the promotion playoffs that season meant that the team at the top of the table after the regular season was promoted. This greatly played into the club's hands as the playoffs have dramatically turned against them in the past; in the 2009–10, 2011–12, 2013–14 and 2014–15 seasons, Bristol finished first in the table, only to be eliminated by Exeter Chiefs, Cornish Pirates, London Welsh and Worcester Warriors respectively, three of whom secured promotion instead.

=== 2018–2019: Return to Premiership and rebrand ===
On 1 June 2018, Bristol Rugby was re-branded as the Bristol Bears following their return to the Premiership.

The club announced a raft of new signings including the All Blacks full back Charles Piutau from Ulster Rugby, former All Blacks Prop John Afoa from Gloucester Rugby and Hooker Harry Thacker from Leicester Tigers.

The opening match of the 2018–19 Premiership Rugby season was against fierce rivals Bath Rugby at Ashton Gate. A crowd of over 26,000 watched Bristol Bears run out 17–10 victors over their old foe. The winning try was scored by Alapati Leiua with four penalties scored by Irish International fly half Ian Madigan. Bristol finished the season in 9th place including nine victories (one over Bath, Harlequins, Northampton Saints, Gloucester and Saracens and two over Leicester Tigers and Newcastle Falcons).

In Europe, Bristol were drawn in Pool 4 of the Challenge Cup with the other teams being Stade Rochelais, Zebre and Yenisey-STM Krasnoyarsk. On 15 December 2018, Bristol recorded a surprise win over Stade Rochelais in a 3–13 at the Stade Marcel-Deflandre through a try by forward Jordan Crane and a dogged defensive display. They finished second in their group before losing 39–15 to Stade Rochelais in the quarter-finals, ending their run in the tournament.

On 29 November, it was confirmed that the Bears would be signing Semi Radradra ahead of the 2020/21 season, joining on a 3-year deal from Bordeaux Bègles, creating one of the most dangerous back three in Rugby Union, alongside Charles Piutau and Luke Morahan.

=== 2019–Present: European success ===
Bristol signed England internationals Nathan Hughes and Dave Attwood in advance of the 2019/2020 season and also Henry Purdy from Coventry Rugby to bring a total of 15 new signings. Players released included Tusi Pisi, Jack Lam and George Smith. Bristol started their second year in the Gallagher Premiership with a home tie against Bath Rugby. This resulted in a 43–16 win for the Bears and included a try on his senior debut for Ioan Lloyd who came on as a replacement at full back.

The season continued with a loss to Harlequin F.C. away before a home win against Sale Sharks and a memorable away win at Sandy Park against the eventual champions, Exeter Chiefs. December brought a dip in form on the domestic front with a home draw with London Irish and defeats to Saracens and Wasps. In the European Challenge Cup, Bristol were drawn against Zebre, CA Brive and Stade Français Paris. Bristol won all but one of these fixtures home and away with the only non win being the 7–7 away draw with Zebre. A return to the premiership resulted in back to back wins against Gloucester, Northampton Saints, Bath and Harlequins. However, the season was then interrupted by the COVID-19 pandemic and all rugby was suspended by the RFU on 17 March 2020. The season resumed on 15 August without any spectators with a home win against . By this time, the club had been joined by the new signings of Semi Radradra, England prop Kyle Sinckler from Harlequin F.C. and the Saracens loanees of Ben Earl and Max Malins. Eventually Bristol finished third in the Premiership meaning an away semi final against Wasps. Bristol lost this 47–24 to finish with a domestic record of 14 wins, 1 draw and 7 losses. A total of 561 points were scored and 457 conceded.

In the Challenge Cup, Bristol finished top of their group and were given a home quarter final against Welsh side Dragons. Bristol ran in seven tries to win 56–17. This set up a home semi final against Bordeaux Bègles which was won by the home side 37–20 after extra time. In the final they faced former European Champions, Toulon at Stade Maurice David in Aix-en-Provence. Bristol scored the fastest try in European Rugby final after just 15 second through a try from scrum half Harry Randall. A second try from Max Malins and points from the tee came from the two conversions and six penalties from the boot of Callum Sheedy to give Bristol the cup with a 32–19 win and their first ever major European title

In September 2023 the club's new away kit incorporated a stylised image of Ursa, a sculpture formerly located in the Bearpit, linking the kit to a piece of Bristol public art.

In December 2024, Bristol won 54–24 away to Leicester Tigers earning a record-breaking tenth consecutive away win the Premiership The following match they lost 0–38 at home to Sale Sharks, the first time since September 2016 that they had not scored a point in a Premiership fixture.

== Season summaries ==
	League					Domestic Cup		European Cup		
Season	Competition	Final Position	Points	Diff	Play-Offs	Competition	Performance	Competition	Performance	Director of Rugby
1987–88	Courage League Division 1	9th	23	+26	N/A	John Player Cup	Runners-up	No competition	N/A	Bob Hesford
1988–89	Courage League Division 1	7th	12	+71	N/A	Pilkington Cup	Quarter-final	No competition	N/A	Bob Hesford
1989–90	Courage League Division 1	9th	8	-8	N/A	Pilkington Cup	Quarter-final	No competition	N/A	Colin McFadyean
1990–91	Courage League Division 1	11th	9	-84	N/A	Pilkington Cup	4th round	No competition	N/A	Rob Cunningham
1991–92	Courage League Division 1	10th	8	+18	N/A	Pilkington Cup	Quarter-final	No competition	N/A	Rob Cunningham
1992–93	Courage League Division 1	6th	12	-21	N/A	Pilkington Cup	3rd round	No competition	N/A	Brian Hanlon
1993–94	Courage League Division 1	4th	20	+55	N/A	Pilkington Cup	5th round	No competition	N/A	Brian Hanlon
1994–95	Courage League Division 1	6th	14	-52	N/A	Pilkington Cup	5th round	No competition	N/A	Brian Hanlon
1995–96	Courage League Division 1	6th	16	-92	N/A	Pilkington Cup	Quarter-final	No English teams	N/A	Alan Davies
1996–97	Courage League Division 1	9th	17	-193	N/A	Pilkington Cup	5th round	Challenge Cup	5th in pool	Darryl Jones
1997–98	Allied Dunbar Premiership	12th (R)	4	-382	N/A	Tetley's Bitter Cup	4th round	Challenge Cup	2nd in pool	Darryl Jones
1997–98	Allied Dunbar Premiership	12th (R)	4	-382	N/A	C&G Cup	Not known	Challenge Cup	2nd in pool	Darryl Jones
1998–99	Allied Dunbar Premiership 2	1st (P)	44	+430	N/A	Tetley's Bitter Cup	4th round	No English teams	N/A	Bob Dwyer
1998–99	Allied Dunbar Premiership 2	1st (P)	44	+430	N/A	C&G Cup	2nd round	No English teams	N/A	Bob Dwyer
1999–00	Allied Dunbar Premiership	6th	34	+30	N/A	Tetley's Bitter Cup	Semi-final	Challenge Cup	Semi-final	Bob Dwyer
2000–01	Zurich Premiership	9th	44	-49	N/A	Tetley's Bitter Cup	5th round	Challenge Cup	3rd in pool	Dean Ryan
2001–02	Zurich Premiership	8th	50	-41	N/A	Powergen Cup	6th round	Challenge Cup	Quarter-final	Dean Ryan
2002–03	Zurich Premiership	12th (R)	36	-129	Powergen Cup	6th round	Heineken Cup	2nd in pool	Peter Thorburn	
2003–04	National Division 1	9th	51	-103	N/A	Powergen Cup	6th round	Not qualified	N/A	Richard Hill
2003–04	National Division 1	9th	51	-103	N/A	Powergen Shield	Champions	Not qualified	N/A	Richard Hill
2004–05	National Division 1	1st (P)	105	+585	N/A	Powergen Cup	Quarter-final	Not qualified	N/A	Richard Hill
2005–06	Guinness Premiership	11th	41	-52	-	Powergen Cup	4th in pool	Challenge Cup	3rd in pool	Richard Hill
2006–07	Guinness Premiership	3rd	64	+4	Semi-final	EDF Energy Cup	3rd in pool	Challenge Cup	Quarter-final	Richard Hill
2007–08	Guinness Premiership	9th	37	-80	-	EDF Energy Cup	3rd in pool	Heineken Cup	3rd in pool	Richard Hill
2008–09	Guinness Premiership	12th (R)	17	-338	-	EDF Energy Cup	4th in pool	Challenge Cup	2nd in pool	Paul Hull
2009–10	RFU Championship	1st	92	+293	Runners-up	British and Irish Cup	2nd in pool	Not qualified	N/A	Paul Hull
2010–11	RFU Championship	8th	41	-72	-	British and Irish Cup	Champions	Not qualified	N/A	Paul Hull
2011–12	RFU Championship	1st	81	+229	Semi-final	British and Irish Cup	4th in pool	Not qualified	N/A	Liam Middleton
2012–13	RFU Championship	5th	65	+43	-	British and Irish Cup	Quarter-final	Not qualified	N/A	Liam Middleton
2013–14	RFU Championship	1st	96	+281	Runners-up	British and Irish Cup	Semi-final	Not qualified	N/A	Andy Robinson
2014–15	RFU Championship	1st	103	+375	Runners-up	British and Irish Cup	Semi-final	Not qualified	N/A	Andy Robinson
2015–16	RFU Championship	1st (P)	95	+321	Champions	British and Irish Cup	2nd in pool	Not qualified	N/A	Andy Robinson
2016–17	Aviva Premiership	12th (R)	20	-325	-	Anglo-Welsh Cup	3rd in pool	Challenge Cup	3rd in pool	Mark Tainton
2017–18	RFU Championship	1st (P)	103	+532	-	British and Irish Cup	3rd in pool	Not qualified	N/A	Pat Lam
2018–19	Gallagher Premiership	9th	51	-77	-	Premiership Cup	2nd in pool	Challenge Cup	Quarter-final	Pat Lam
2019-20	Gallagher Premiership	3rd	69	+104	Semi-final	Premiership Cup	2nd in pool	Challenge Cup	Champions	Pat Lam
2020-21	Gallagher Premiership	1st	85	+182	Semi-final	no competition	n/a	Champions Cup	Round of 16	Pat Lam
2021-22	Gallagher Premiership	10th	48	-145	-	Premiership Cup	4th in pool	Champions Cup	Round of 16	Pat Lam
2022-23	Gallagher Premiership	9th	47	-21	-	Premiership Cup	3rd in pool	Challenge Cup	Round of 16	Pat Lam
2023–24	Gallagher Premiership	5th	54	+144	-	Premiership Cup	3rd in pool	Champions Cup	6th in Pool	Pat Lam
2024-25	Gallagher Premiership	4th	58	+55	Semi-final	Premiership Cup	2nd in pool	Champions Cup	6th in Pool	Pat Lam
2025-26	Gallagher Premiership	6th	54	+16	-	Premiership Cup	5th in pool	Champions Cup	Round of 16	Pat Lam

Gold background denotes champions
Silver background denotes runners-up
Pink background denotes relegated

== Club honours ==
=== Bristol Bears ===
- European Challenge Cup
  - Champions: (1) 2019–20
- RFU Championship
  - Champions: (4) 1998–99, 2004–05, 2015–16, 2017–18
- RFU Knockout Cup
  - Champions: (1) 1982–83
  - Runners–Up: (3) 1972–73, 1983–84, 1987–88
- British and Irish Cup
  - Champions: (1) 2010–11
- EDF Energy Trophy
  - Champions: (1) 2003–04 actually called Powergen Shield
- Anglo-Welsh Merit Table Winners
  - Champions: (3) 1965–66, 1971–72, 1973–74
- RFU South West Merit Table Winners
  - Champions: (3) 1979–80, 1980–81, 1981–82

== Current squad ==
=== Senior squad ===
The Bristol Bears squad for the 2026–27 season is:

Bristol Bears 2026–27 Premiership Rugby squad
**Props**: (England) Lovejoy Chawatama; (England) **Ellis Genge** (Note: Ellis Genge is jointly contracted with the RFU, via an enhanced England Elite Player Squad (EPS) contract.); (England) Max Lahiff; (England) **George Kloska**; (England) Andrew Turner; (England) Jake Woolmore; **Hookers**: (Wales) Tomas Gwilliam; (England) Sol Moody; (England) **Gabriel Oghre**; (England) Harry Thacker; **Locks**: (England) Joe Batley; (England) Josh Caulfield; (England) Joe Owen; (Argentina) **Pedro Rubiolo**; (England) **Harry Wells**	**Back row**: (Argentina) **Benjamín Grondona**; (England) Fitz Harding; (Georgia (country)) **Luka Ivanishvili**; (England) Khalik Kareem; (Samoa) **Steven Luatua**; (Fiji) **Viliame Mata**; (England) Ethan Staddon; **Scrum-halves**: (Ireland) **Kieran Marmion**; (England) Max Pepper; (England) **Harry Randall**; (United States) **Oscar Lennon**; **Fly-halves**: (Scotland) **Tom Jordan**; (United States) **AJ MacGinty**; (England) Louie Sinclair	**Centres**: (England) Max Clark; (England) **Benhard Janse van Rensburg**; (Argentina) **Matías Moroni**; (Fiji) **Kalaveti Ravouvou**; (England) James Williams; **Wings**: (England) Jack Bates; (England) Gabriel Ibitoye; (Wales) **Louis Rees-Zammit**; **Fullbacks**: (England) Noah Heward; (England) Tobi Wilson
**(c)** denotes the team captain. **Bold** denotes internationally capped players. Source:

=== Academy squad ===
The Bristol Bears Academy squad is:

Bristol Bears 2026–27 Senior Academy squad
**Props**: (England) Kaiden Corbett; (England) Evan Davies; (England) Jimmy Halliwell; (Wales) Sam Scott; (Wales) Louie Trevett; (England) Michael Whittaker; **Hookers**: (England) Kieran Hill; (England) Casper Wheeler; **Locks**: (Wales) Kenzie Jenkins; (England) Ethan Surrey; (England) George Taylor; (England) Monty Wells	**Back row**: (England) Will Papp; (England) Paddy Pearce; (England) Ben Rogers; (England) Jake Smith; (Wales) Noah Williams; **Fly-halves**: (England) Sam Worsley	**Centres**: (England) Bruno Lamb; (England) Will Moore; (England) Victor Worsnip; **Wings**: (Wales) Aidan Boshoff; (Scotland) Glen Gammell; (England) Olly Harris; (England) Ben Rogers; (Scotland) George Williams; **Fullbacks**: (Wales) Josh Carrington; (Wales) Evan Morris; (England) Caspar Reeves
Italics denotes U20 international. Source:

== Club staff ==
Management

- Owner – Stephen Lansdown
- Chairman – Chris Booy
- Chief Executive Officer – Tom Tainton

First team coaching

- Director of rugby – Pat Lam
- Forwards Coach – Mark Irish
- Senior Backs & Skills Coach – Dave Walder
- Defence Coach - Jordan Crane
- Assistant Forwards Coach - Chris Morgan
- Assistant Backs & Skills Coach – Sean Marsden
- Kicking Coach - Dave Alred
- Mental Skills Coach - Tom Bates
- Head of Athletic Performance – Kevin Geary

Academy

- Senior academy manager – Gethin Watts
- Junior academy manager – Gary Townsend
- Academy transition coach – Danny Grewcock
- Academy transition coach – Glen Townson
- Senior Academy Coach - Brad Barnes
- Junior Academy Coach - Keith Leaker

Bristol Bears Women

- Head coach - Dave Ward
- Assistant coach - Tom Luke

== Head Coaches/Directors of Rugby ==
Years	Name	Achievements
1980–1984	David Tyler	RFU South West Merit Table winners 1980, 1981, 1982; John Player Cup winners 1983; John Player Cup finalists 1984
1984–1986	Mike Rafter	
1986 - 1989	Bob Hesford	John Player Cup Quarter-finalists 1987; John Player Cup Finalists 1988; Pilkington Cup Quarter-finalists 1989
1989 - 1990	Colin McFadyean	Pilkington Cup Quarter-finalists 1990
1990–1992	Rob Cunningham	Pilkington Cup Quarter-finalists 1992
1992–1995	Brian Hanlon	
1995–1996	Alan Davies	
1996–1998	Darryl Jones	Pilkington Cup Quarter-finalists 1996
1998–2000	Bob Dwyer	Allied Dunbar Premiership Two champions – promoted to Allied Dunbar Premiership One 1998–99; Tetley's Bitter Cup Semi-finalists 2000
2000–2002	Dean Ryan	Zurich Premiership Finalists 2002
2002–2003	Peter Thorburn	
2003–2008	Richard Hill	National Division One Champions – Promoted to Guinness Premiership 2004–05; Powergen Shield Champions 2004
2008–2011	Paul Hull	British and Irish Cup champions 2011
2011–2013	Liam Middleton	British and Irish Cup Quarter-finalists 2013
2013–2016	Andy Robinson	British and Irish Cup Semi-finalists 2014; British and Irish Cup Semi-finalists 2015; Greene King IPA Championship Champions 2015/2016 - Promoted to Aviva Premiership 2016/17
2016–2017	Mark Tainton	
2017–	Pat Lam	Greene King IPA Championship Champions 2017/2018 - Promoted to Gallagher Premiership 2018/19; European Challenge Cup Winners 2019/20; Gallagher Premiership Semi-Finalists 2019/20 (3rd); Gallagher Premiership Semi-Finalists 2020/21 (1st); Gallagher Premiership Semi-Finalists 2024/25 (4th)

== Notable and former players ==
=== Lions tourists ===
The following Bristol players have been selected for the Lions tours while at the club:

- Wallace Jarman (1899 (Australia) )
- Percy Down (1908 (Australia) (New Zealand) )
- Maurice Edward Neale (1910 Tour to South Africa)
- Jack Spoors (1910 Tour to South Africa)
- Tom Richards (1910 Tour to South Africa)
- John Pullin (1968 (South Africa) & 1971 (Australia) (New Zealand) )
- Alan Morley (1974 (South Africa) )
- Mark Regan (1997 (South Africa) & 2001 (Australia) )
- Simon Shaw (1997 (South Africa) )
- Kyle Sinckler (2021 (South Africa) )
- Ellis Genge (2025 (Australia) )

=== Rugby World Cup ===
The following are players which have represented their countries at the Rugby World Cup whilst playing for Bristol:

Tournament	Players selected	England players	Other national team players
1987	2	Richard Harding, Jonathan Webb	
1991	0		
1995	1	Kyran Bracken	
1999	8	Garath Archer, Kyran Bracken, David Rees	Jamie Mayer (Scotland) , Pablo Lemoine (Uruguay) , Al Charron (vc) (Canada) , Agustín Pichot, Eduardo Simone (Argentina)
2003	1		Ross Beattie (Scotland)
2007	5	Mark Regan, Shaun Perry	Alfie To'oala, David Lemi (Samoa) , Marko Stanojevic (Italy)
2011	1		William Helu (Tonga)
2015	4		Matthew Morgan (Wales) , Anthony Perenise, Jack Lam (Samoa) , Tommaso Benvenuti (Italy)
2019	5		James Lay, Jordan Lay, Chris Vui, Alapati Leiua (Samoa) , Siale Piutau (c) (Tonga)
2023	7	Ellis Genge (vc), Kyle Sinckler, Max Malins	Kalaveti Ravouvou (Fiji) , Santiago Grondona (Argentina) , Chris Vui (c), Steve Luatua (Samoa)

== Archives ==
Records relating to Bristol Rugby Club are held at Bristol Archives (Ref. 41582) (online catalogue) and (Ref. 44624) (online catalogue).
