= Charles Piutau =

New Zealand rugby union player

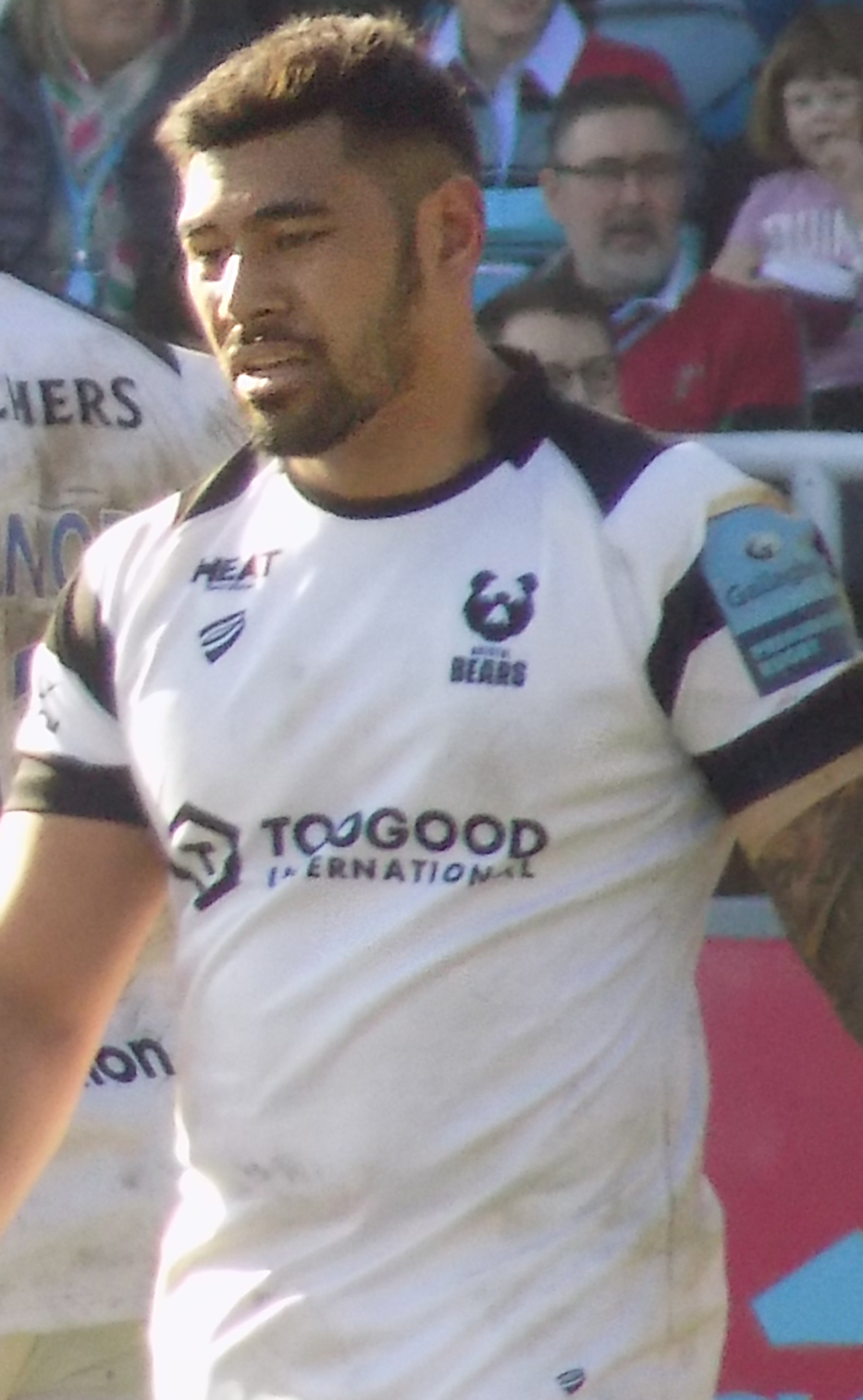
- Piutau representing Bristol Bears during the Gallagher Premiership
- Full name: Salesi Tu'ipulotu Piutau
- Born: 31 October 1991 (age 35) Auckland, New Zealand
- Height: 1.86 m (6 ft 1 in)
- Weight: 100 kg (220 lb; 15 st 10 lb)
- School: Wesley College
- Notable relative: Siale Piutau (brother)

Rugby union career
- Position(s): Fullback, Wing, Centre
- Current team: Shimizu Blue Sharks
Senior career
Years	Team	Apps	(Points)
2010–2015	Auckland	34	(45)
2012–2015	Blues	41	(40)
2015–2016	Wasps	25	(50)
2016–2018	Ulster	45	(60)
2018–2023	Bristol Bears	83	(100)
2023–2026	Shizuoka Blue Revs	44	(35)
2026–	Shimizu Blue Sharks		
- Correct as of 14 January 2024
International career
Years	Team	Apps	(Points)
2010	Tonga U20s	5	(5)
2011	New Zealand U20s	4	(30)
2013–2015	New Zealand	17	(25)
2022–	Tonga	9	(5)
- Correct as of 14 January 2024
National sevens team
Years	Team		Comps
2011–2012	New Zealand		9
- Correct as of 14 January 2024

Salesi Tu'ipulotu Piutau (born 31 October 1991), often known as Charles Piutau, is a professional rugby union player who plays as a fullback for Japan Rugby League One club Shizuoka Blue Revs.

Born in New Zealand to Tongan parents, he represented both Tonga and New Zealand at Under-20 level. He won 17 senior caps for New Zealand between 2013 and 2015. He made his debut for Tonga in 2022, following a change in eligibility rules, and has since won 5 caps.

== Early life ==
Piutau was born in New Zealand to Tongan parents. He grew up on the Auckland suburb of Māngere and attended Wesley College. He is the youngest of 10 children.

In 2010, Piutau represented Tonga at the IRB Junior World Championship in Argentina. Piutau was the top try scorer for the New Zealand Under-20s in their 2011 World Championship-winning campaign.

Charles played club rugby for Pakuranga United Rugby Club. He is the younger brother of ex Bristol Bears centre Siale Piutau.

== Club career ==
Piutau made his debut for Auckland in 2010. He was brought into the Blues squad in 2012 and confirmed as fullback in 2014.

On 1 April 2015, it was announced Piutau would join Irish club Ulster from the start of the 2016–17 season.

Piutau signed for English club Wasps in the Aviva Premiership during the 2015–16 season. During his season at Wasps, Piutau had a strong impact. He scored a try in the 80th minute against Exeter Chiefs in the European Rugby Champions Cup quarter-final to help Wasps reach the semi-final. Piutau was nominated for the Aviva Premiership Player of the Season and was named in the Team of the Season.

In August 2017, Ulster confirmed that Piutau would be leaving the province at the end of the 2017–18 Pro14 season to join Bristol Bears.

== International career ==
Piutau joined the All Blacks training squad during the 2013 Super Rugby season. On 22 June, he made his test debut against France in New Plymouth. He was not selected for the 2015 World Cup, a factor in his decision to move to play club rugby in Europe.

== Personal life ==
Piutau married in July 2018.

Piutau has invested in multiple houses in Auckland New Zealand, Singapore, Australia, India, South Africa, Switzerland, Hawaii, Thailand and the United Kingdom.

== Career statistics ==
=== International analysis by opposition ===
Opposition	Played	Win	Loss	Draw	Tries	Points	Win %
Argentina	3	3	0	0	1	5	1.000
Australia	3	3	0	0	0	0	1.000
England	1	1	0	0	0	0	1.000
Fiji	1	0	1	0	0	0	.000
France	2	2	0	0	1	5	1.000
Japan	1	1	0	0	2	10	1.000
Samoa	1	1	0	0	0	0	1.000
Scotland	1	1	0	0	0	0	1.000
South Africa	3	3	0	0	0	0	1.000
United States	1	1	0	0	1	5	1.000
Wales	1	1	0	0	0	0	1.000
Career	18	17	1	0	5	25	.944

as of 23 June 2023
