= Shimizu Koto Blue Sharks =

Japanese rugby union club, based in Tokyo

Shimizu Koto Blue Sharks 清水建設江東ブルーシャークス
- Full name: Shimizu Koto Blue Sharks
- Nickname: Blue Sharks
- Founded: 1976; 50 years ago
- Ground(s): Yumenoshima Stadium, Kōtō (Capacity: 5,050)
- Coach: Hiroyuki Yoshihiro
- Captains: Sanshiro Nomura; Koyo Adachi
- League(s): Japan Rugby League One, Division Two
- 2025–26: 2nd (lost promotion play-off)
Home kit	Away kit

Official website
- blue-sharks.jp

Shimizu Koto Blue Sharks (Japanese: 清水建設江東ブルーシャークス) is a Japanese rugby union team in the Japan Rugby League One (JRLO). The team is the rugby team of architectural, civil engineering and general contracting firm Shimizu, based in Chūō in Tokyo.

== History ==
Founded in 1976 under the mantle of construction giant Shimizu Corporation, the team gradually improved its presence in Japanese rugby. Known at the time as the Shimizu Construction Rugby Club (Japanese: 清水建設ラグビー部), their landmark Kantō League Division 4 victory in 1983 launched a steady ascent, featured by a series of back-to-back promotions through the late 1980s and 1990s. The team joined the second-tier Top East League upon its inception in 2003 under the name Shimizu Blue Sharks, or Shimizu Contruction Blue Sharks (Japanese: 清水建設ブルーシャークス). Following a decade in the lower tiers after a 2007–08 relegation, they made a triumphant return in 2017–18. Back-to-back standout seasons, culminating in a 2018 league championship and a playoff victory over the Chugoku Electric Power Red Regulions, propelled the Sharks into the Top Challenge League, then Japan's second tier rugby union competition behind the Top League, and subsequently into Japan Rugby League One's Division 3 at its launch in 2022. The team rebranded as the Shimizu Koto Blue Sharks (Japanese: 清水建設江東ブルーシャークス), for which the name still stands. Shimizu denoting the teams owner, Kōtō referring to the Tokyo special ward that the team is located in, and Blue Sharks being the team nickname.

In 2023, the Blue Sharks entered a 12-month high-performance partnership with New Zealand provincial club Taranaki. In 2026, after three years in partnership together, which involved an exchange of players and staff, the agreement was extended to 2027.

Despite an immediate setback after gaining promotion in the league's maiden season, a strong rebounding effort two years later secured their place in the newly restructured Division 2. In their 2025–26 season, the Blue Sharks finished second overall on the season standings (their best season to date), entering the D1/D2 promotion play-offs for the first time. Placed against 11th position side Urayasu D-Rocks, the Blue Sharks lost both legs of their tie, conceding almost 100 points on aggregate.

In July 2026, the Blue Sharks signed another international partnership: a multi-year international development partnership with Premiership club Gloucester Rugby. The partnership saw six Blue Sharks players and five staff members embed within the Gloucester pre-season setup at Kingsholm Stadium for an intensive month-long immersion. Designed as a two-way knowledge exchange, the programmes aims were to foster high-performance innovation and share operational best practices, further deepening the ties between the two clubs. The initiative followed a growing trend of international club alignment, coming after the Harlequins' landmark 2018 deal with New Zealand and Leicester Tigers' Performance Partnership with the Mitsubishi Sagamihara Dynaboars in early 2025.

== Grounds and region ==
Blue Sharks venues in the Greater Tokyo Area

Despite their training facilities being located in Tsuzuki-ku, Kanagawa Prefecture, the team's home venue is the Yumenoshima Stadium located in the Tokyo special ward of Kōtō. The team has been located at the venue since their debut JRLO season in 2022 after signing a partnership with the Kōtō Ward to be the teams formal host area.

Throughout their tenure in the JRLO, they have played at two different venues outside their home stadium in Kōtō. Setagaya's Komazawa Olympic Park Stadium (Japanese: 駒沢オリンピック公園総合運動場陸上競技場) hosted the Blue Sharks and the Kurita Water Gush in their 2023–24 regular season matchup. The venue change was sponsored by 321 Co., Ltd., a live streamer management agency. The second venue to host the Blue Sharks was Odawara City Shiroyama Athletic Stadium (Japanese: 小田原市城山陸上競技場) located in Kanagawa's Odawara.

Yumenoshima (Tokyo)	Setagaya (Tokyo)	Odawara (Kanagawa)
Yumenoshima Stadium	Komazawa Olympic Park Stadium	Odawara Shiroyama Stadium
Capacity: 5,050	Capacity: 20,010	Capacity: 15,000

== Squad ==
The Shimizu Koto Blue Sharks squad for the 2026–27 season is:

Shimizu Koto Blue Sharks squad
Props: (Japan) Sanshiro Nomura (cc); (Japan) Taketo Yoshikawa; (Japan) Daiki Shimura; (Japan) Takatoshi Sugawara; (Japan) Daisuke Yamato; (Japan) Junnosuke Ito; (Japan) Tomoki Yunbe; (Japan) Ryota Saito; (Japan) Shinya Nara; (Japan) Jui Nakamori; (Japan) Naohiro Aso; (South Korea) Li U-ha*; Hookers: (Japan) Kunpei Ōnishi; (Japan) Kaito Tamori; (Japan) Naomichi Tatekawa; (Japan) Yasuyuki Yamamoto; (South Korea) Kim Yong-chol*; (Tonga) Mahe Vailanu; Locks: (Japan) Suguru Hidaka; (Japan) Tetsunori Ōsaki; (Japan) Ryota Sakino; (Japan) Daichi Sato; (New Zealand) Tom Rowe*; (New Zealand) Allan Craig; (Japan) Koyo Adachi (cc); (England) Ed Holmes; (Japan) Uwe Helu; (Tonga) Ika Motulalo Takau*	Flankers: (Japan) Ginjiro Hase; (Japan) Haruki Matsudo; (Japan) Kodai Takahashi; (Tonga) Sione Havili Talitui; (Japan) Yoshinobu Ōtake; (Japan) Noel Kawamura; No8s: (Japan) Yutaro Shirako; (Japan) Taisei Konishi; (Japan) Keito Hayashi; (New Zealand) Talifolofola Tangipa*; Scrum-halves: (New Zealand) Sam Nock; (Japan) Haruhiro Sakahara; (Japan) Reijiro Usui; (Japan) Tatsuya Kanetsuki; (Japan) Maito Matsuo; Fly-halves: (Japan) Soichiro Kuwata; (Japan) Masaya Yamada; (New Zealand) Lucas Cashmore; (Ireland) Billy Burns	Centres: (Japan) Keishiro Kuwata; (New Zealand) Orbyn Leger*; (Japan) Takuya Kanemura; (New Zealand) Noah Foster; (Tonga) Siale Piutau; (New Zealand) Terrence Hepetema; (Japan) Tatsuya Fujioka; (Fiji) Maritino Nemani*; Wingers: (Japan) Yūji Takai; (New Zealand) Essendon Tuitupou; Fullbacks: (New Zealand) Cole Forbes; (Japan) Tatsuhiro Ozaki; (Japan) Genta Nishibata; (New Zealand) Cameron Bailey*; Utility Backs: (Tonga) Charles Piutau
(c) denotes team captain.

== Coaches ==
- Natsuki Kurosu (2018–2020)
- Steve Jackson (2020–2021)
- Ippei Asada (2021–2023)
- Hiroyuki Yoshihiro (2023–present)

== See also ==
- Top Challenge League
