= 2012 end-of-year rugby union internationals =

The 2012 autumn internationals, also known as the autumn tests, November tests and, in the Southern Hemisphere, the end of year tests, were international rugby union matches. They were predominantly played between visiting Southern Hemisphere countries and European nations.

The IRB introduced an International Rugby Series, to improve competitiveness ahead of the next World Cup, that included Tier 2 nations Tonga, Canada, Russia, Samoa and the United States. The first tournament was held at Colwyn Bay's Eirias Stadium in North Wales.

The tournament was in addition to those tests played between Tier 1 and Tier 2 nations. Wales and France hosted Samoa, England and Ireland hosted Fiji and Scotland and Italy hosted Tonga.

Both Georgia and Romania hosted Japan, while Portugal travelled to South America to play a two test tour, where they earnt victories over Uruguay and Chile. Namibia hosted a tournament including Spain and Zimbabwe, with Spain winning both tests to clinch the tournament.

== Matches ==
=== 20 October ===
20 October 2012
20:00 AEST (UTC+10)

Australia	18–18	New Zealand
Pen: Harris (5/5) 2', 27', 31', 40', 74'; Beale (1/2) 50'	Report	Pen: Carter (6/8) 6', 10', 52', 54', 66', 70'

Suncorp Stadium, Brisbane
Attendance: 51,888
Referee: Craig Joubert (South Africa)

Team details

Australia
FB	15	Mike Harris
RW	14	Nick Cummins		(substituted off) 66'
OC	13	Ben Tapuai
IC	12	Pat McCabe
LW	11	Adam Ashley-Cooper
FH	10	Kurtley Beale
SH	9	Nick Phipps		(substituted off) 70'
N8	8	Wycliff Palu		(substituted off) 45'
OF	7	Michael Hooper	(yellow card) 54' to 64'
BF	6	Scott Higginbotham
RL	5	Nathan Sharpe (c)
LL	4	Sitaleki Timani		(substituted off) 20'
TP	3	James Slipper		(substituted off) 40'
HK	2	Tatafu Polota-Nau		(substituted off) 72'
LP	1	Benn Robinson
Replacements:
HK	16	James Hanson		(substituted on) 72'
PR	17	Sekope Kepu		(substituted on) 40'
LK	18	Kane Douglas		(substituted on) 20'	(substituted off) 64'
FL	19	Dave Dennis		(substituted on) 45'
FL	20	Liam Gill			(substituted on) 64'
SH	21	Brett Sheehan		(substituted on) 70'
CE	22	Drew Mitchell		(substituted on) 66'
Coach:
(New Zealand) Robbie Deans

New Zealand
FB	15	Israel Dagg
RW	14	Cory Jane
OC	13	Conrad Smith		(substituted off) 51'
IC	12	Ma'a Nonu		(substituted off) 61'
LW	11	Hosea Gear
FH	10	Dan Carter
SH	9	Aaron Smith		(substituted off) 59'
N8	8	Kieran Read
OF	7	Richie McCaw (c)
BF	6	Liam Messam		45' to 49'		(substituted off) 70'
RL	5	Sam Whitelock
LL	4	Brodie Retallick
TP	3	Charlie Faumuina				(substituted off) 50'
HK	2	Keven Mealamu		(substituted off) 56'
LP	1	Tony Woodcock	(yellow card) 39' to 49'
Replacements:
HK	16	Andrew Hore		(substituted on) 56'
PR	17	Owen Franks		(substituted on) 45'	(substituted off) 49'	(substituted on) 50'
LK	18	Luke Romano		(substituted on) 67'
N8	19	Victor Vito				(substituted on) 70'
SH	20	Piri Weepu		(substituted on) 59'
FH	21	Aaron Cruden		(substituted on) 61'
WG	22	Ben Smith		(substituted on) 51'
Coach:
(New Zealand) Steve Hansen

Touch judges:
Jaco Peyper (South Africa)
Lourens van der Merwe (South Africa)
Television match official:
Matt Goddard (Australia)

Notes:

- James Hanson made his international debut for Australia in this match.
- Keven Mealamu won his 100th cap for the All Blacks, he became the 22nd international player and 3rd All Black to reach the landmark.
- Piri Weepu equalled the record held by Ollie le Roux for most international caps from the bench with his 43rd substitute appearance from his 66 caps.
- Tony Woodcock equalled the All Black record held by Kees Meeuws for most yellow cards in a career with his third yellow card.
- The draw ended New Zealand's 16-match winning streak, also ending their chances of surpassing Lithuania's record streak of 18 wins.
- This match ended New Zealand's sequence of 105 consecutive matches of scoring a try in a match, it was the first match the All Blacks didn't score a try since 2004. The run of 105 consecutive matches of scoring a try in a match remains an international rugby record.

=== 4 November ===
4 November 2012
14:00 WET/GMT+0 (UTC+0)

Oxford University (England)	15–29	Russia
Try: Hudson; Lamont; Con: Marr (1/2); Pen: Marr (1/4)	Report	Try: Tsnobiladze; Garbuzov; Temnov; Simplikevich (2); Con: Klyuchnikov (2/5)

Oxford University Sports Centre, Oxford
Referee: Tim Wigglesworth (England)

=== 10/11 November ===
10 November 2012
16:00 EET/GMT+02 (UTC+02)

Romania	23–34	Japan
Try: Lemnaru 60' c Penalty try 73' c Con: Florea (2/2) 61', 73'; Pen: Filip (3/5) 3', 17', 36'	Report (In Romanian)	Try: Kikutani 42' m Penalty try 70' c Onozawa 71' c Con: Goromaru (2/3) 71', 72'; Pen: Goromaru (5/5) 7', 12', 22', 39', 80'

Stadionul Naţional de Rugby, Bucharest
Referee: Jaco Peyper (South Africa)

Team details

FB	15	Cătălin Fercu
RW	14	Mădălin Lemnaru
OC	13	Ionel Cazan		(substituted off) 48'
IC	12	Csaba Gál
LW	11	Ionut Botezatu
FH	10	Andrei Filip		(substituted off) 58'
SH	9	Florin Surugiu
N8	8	Mihai Macovei (c)
OF	7	Viorel Lucaci		(substituted off) 54'
BF	6	Vasile Rus	(yellow card) 38' to 48'
RL	5	Marius Sirbe
LL	4	Valentin Ursache		(substituted off) 54'
TP	3	Horaţiu Pungea		(substituted off) 61'
HK	2	Otar Turashvili
LP	1	Petru Tamba
Replacements:
HK	16	Andrei Rădoi
PR	17	Vlad Bădălicescu		(substituted on) 61'
LK	18	Alin Coste		(substituted on) 54'
FL	19	Alexandru Manta		(substituted on) 54'
SH	20	Grigoras Diaconescu
FH	21	Ionuț Florea		(substituted on) 58'
WG	22	Constantin Gheară		(substituted on) 48'
PR	23	Romulus Boar
Coach:
Haralambie Dumitras

FB	15	Ayumu Goromaru
RW	14	Toshiaki Hirose (c)
OC	13	Tomohiro Senba	(substituted off) 76'
IC	12	Harumichi Tatekawa
LW	11	Hirotoki Onozawa
FH	10	Kosei Ono
SH	9	Fumiaki Tanaka	(substituted off) 76'
N8	8	Takashi Kikutani
OF	7	Michael Leitch
BF	6	Hendrik Tui	(substituted off) 66'
RL	5	Luke Thompson	(substituted off) 65'
LL	4	Hitoshi Ono
TP	3	Hiroshi Yamashita	(substituted off) 65'
HK	2	Shota Horie
LP	1	Yusuke Nagae
Replacements:
HK	16	Haruki Ota
PR	17	Takuma Asahara
PR	18	Kensuke Hatakeyama	(substituted on) 65'
FL	19	Koliniasi Holani	(substituted on) 76'
LK	20	Michael Broadhurst	(substituted on) 75'
SH	21	Atsushi Hiwasa	(substituted on) 76'
FH	22	Yu Tamura
CE	23	Go Aruga	(substituted on) 76'
Coach:
(Australia) Eddie Jones

Touch judges:
Christophe Berdos (France)
Stéphane Pomarede (France)

10 November 2012
15:00 CET/GMT+01 (UTC+01)

Italy	28–23	Tonga
Try: Cittadini 6' m Ghiraldini 39' c Penalty Try 63' c Con: Burton (2/3) 40', 64'; Pen: Burton (3/3) 13', 27', 52'	Report	Try: Taumalolo 33' c Vainikolo 67' c Con: 'Apikotoa (2/2) 34', 68'; Pen: 'Apikotoa (3/3) 3', 10', 24'

Stadio Mario Rigamonti, Brescia
Attendance: 18,756
Referee: Greg Garner (England)

Team details

FB	15	Andrea Masi
RW	14	Tommaso Iannone
OC	13	Tommaso Benvenuti
IC	12	Alberto Sgarbi
LW	11	Luke McLean
FH	10	Kris Burton
SH	9	Tobias Botes		(substituted off) 71'
N8	8	Sergio Parisse (c)	(yellow card) 23' to 33'
OF	7	Robert Barbieri
BF	6	Alessandro Zanni		(substituted off) 64'
RL	5	Joshua Furno
LL	4	Quintin Geldenhuys		(substituted off) 62'
TP	3	Lorenzo Cittadini		(substituted off) 62'
HK	2	Leonardo Ghiraldini		(substituted off) 71'
LP	1	Andrea Lo Cicero		(substituted off) 71'
Replacements:
HK	16	Davide Giazzon		(substituted on) 71'
PR	17	Alberto de Marchi		(substituted on) 71'
PR	18	Martin Castrogiovanni		(substituted on) 62'
LK	19	Antonio Pavanello		(substituted on) 62'
FL	20	Simone Favaro		(substituted on) 64'
SH	21	Edoardo Gori		(substituted on) 71'
FH	22	Luciano Orquera
WG	23	Giovanbattista Venditti
Coach:
(France) Jacques Brunel

FB	15	Vunga Lilo	(yellow card) 73' to 80'
RW	14	Fetuʻu Vainikolo
OC	13	Suka Hufanga		(substituted off) 71'
IC	12	Sione Piukala		(substituted off) 64'
LW	11	William Helu
FH	10	Fangatapu Apikotoa		(substituted off) 75'
SH	9	Taniela Moa (c)
N8	8	Viliami Maʻafu
OF	7	Sione Vaiomoʻunga		(substituted off) 62'
BF	6	Steve Mafi
RL	5	Lua Lokotui	(yellow card) 60' to 70'	(substituted off) 75'
LL	4	Joe Tuineau
TP	3	Halani Aulika		(substituted off) 62'
HK	2	Elvis Taione
LP	1	Sona Taumalolo		(substituted off) 71'
Replacements:
HK	16	Ilaisa Maʻasi			(substituted on) 78'
PR	17	Tevita Mailau		(substituted on) 62'
PR	18	Hale T-Pole		(substituted on) 75'
N8	19	Paula Kaho		(substituted on) 62'	(substituted off) 78'
SH	20	Samisoni Fisilau		(substituted on) 75'
WG	21	Alipate Fatafehi		(substituted on) 64'
WG	22	Viliame Iongi		(substituted on) 71'
PR	23	Soane Tongaʻuiha		(substituted on) 71'
Coach:
Mana Otai

Touch judges:
Alain Rolland (Ireland)
Mathieu Raynal (France)
Television match official:
Eric Gauzins (France)

10 November 2012
14:30 WET/GMT+0 (UTC+0)

England	54–12	Fiji
Try: Sharples 21' c, 57' c Penalty Try 35' c Monye 40' m Johnson 47 c Tuilagi 68' m, 75' c Con: Flood (4/6) 22', 35', 49', 58'; Farrell (1/1) 76'; Pen: Flood (3/3) 18', 25', 42'	Report	Try: Matawalu 55' m Kalou 79' c Con: Matavesi (1/2) 80'

Twickenham Stadium, London
Attendance: 82,000
Referee: Glen Jackson (New Zealand)

Team details

FB	15	Alex Goode
RW	14	Charlie Sharples
OC	13	Manu Tuilagi
IC	12	Brad Barritt
LW	11	Ugo Monye		(substituted off) 59'
FH	10	Toby Flood		(substituted off) 59'
SH	9	Danny Care	(yellow card) 9' to 19'	(substituted off) 59'
N8	8	Thomas Waldrom
OF	7	Chris Robshaw (c)
BF	6	Tom Johnson		(substituted off) 59'
RL	5	Geoff Parling
LL	4	Tom Palmer		(substituted off) 50'
TP	3	Dan Cole		(substituted off) 63'
HK	2	Tom Youngs		(substituted off) 65'
LP	1	Joe Marler		(substituted off) 46'
Replacements:
HK	16	David Paice		(substituted on) 65'
PR	17	David Wilson		(substituted on) 63'
PR	18	Mako Vunipola		(substituted on) 46'
LK	19	Joe Launchbury		(substituted on) 50'
FL	20	Tom Wood		(substituted on) 59'
SH	21	Ben Youngs		(substituted on) 59'
FH	22	Owen Farrell		(substituted on) 59'
FB	23	Mike Brown		(substituted on) 59'
Coach:
Stuart Lancaster

FB	15	Simeli Koniferedi		(substituted off) 40'
RW	14	Samu Wara		(substituted off) 67'
OC	13	Vereniki Goneva
IC	12	Sireli Naqelevuki
LW	11	Watisoni Votu		(substituted off) 72'
FH	10	Metuisela Talebula
SH	9	Nikola Matawalu
N8	8	Akapusi Qera
OF	7	Malakai Ravulo		30' to 40'
BF	6	Api Naikatini		(substituted off) 52'
RL	5	Apisalome Ratuniyarawa		(substituted off) 73'
LL	4	Leone Nakarawa
TP	3	Deacon Manu (c)	(yellow card) 29' to 39'	(substituted off) 67'
HK	2	Viliame Veikoso		(substituted off) 47'
LP	1	Penijamini Makutu
Replacements:
HK	16	Seremaia Naurere		(substituted on) 47'
PR	17	Setefano Somoca		(substituted on) 30'	(substituted off) 40'
PR	18	Manasa Saulo		(substituted on) 67'
LK	19	Sekonaia Kalou		(substituted on) 73'
FL	20	Iliesa Ratuva		(substituted on) 52'
SH	21	Kelemedi Bola		(substituted on) 72'
CE	22	Ravai Fatiaki		(substituted on) 67'
CE	23	Josh Matavesi		(substituted on) 40'
Coach:
Inoke Male

Touch judges:
Craig Joubert (South Africa)
Marius Mitrea (Italy)
Television match official:
Gareth Simmonds (Wales)

10 November 2012
14:30 WET/GMT+0 (UTC+0)

Wales	12–26	Argentina
Pen: Halfpenny (4/4) 5', 13', 26', 47'	Report	Try: Imhoff 54' c Camacho 59' c Con: Sánchez (2/2) 55', 59'; Pen: Contepomi (1/2) 3'; Sánchez (1/3) 71'; Drop: Sánchez 9' 51'

Millennium Stadium, Cardiff
Attendance: 51,442
Referee: Romain Poite (France)

Team details

FB	15	Leigh Halfpenny
RW	14	Alex Cuthbert
OC	13	Scott Williams
IC	12	Jamie Roberts	(substituted off) 23'
LW	11	George North
FH	10	Rhys Priestland
SH	9	Tavis Knoyle	(substituted off) 56'
N8	8	Taulupe Faletau
OF	7	Sam Warburton (c)	(substituted off) 70'
BF	6	Josh Turnbull
RL	5	Ian Evans
LL	4	Alun Wyn Jones	(substituted off) 39'
TP	3	Aaron Jarvis	(substituted off) 60'
HK	2	Matthew Rees	(substituted off) 60'
LP	1	Gethin Jenkins	(substituted off) 68'
Replacements:
HK	16	Richard Hibbard	(substituted on) 60'
PR	17	Ryan Bevington	(substituted on) 68'
PR	18	Paul James	(substituted on) 60'
FL	19	Rob McCusker	(substituted on) 39'
FL	20	Justin Tipuric	(substituted on) 70'
SH	21	Mike Phillips	(substituted on) 56'
FH	22	James Hook	(substituted on) 23'
FB	23	Liam Williams
Coach:
Rob Howley

FB	15	Juan Martín Hernández	(substituted off) 45'
RW	14	Gonzalo Camacho
OC	13	Gonzalo Tiesi
IC	12	Felipe Contepomi	(substituted off) 13'
LW	11	Juan Imhoff
FH	10	Nicolás Sánchez
SH	9	Martín Landajo	(substituted off) 66'
N8	8	Leonardo Senatore	(substituted off) 56'
OF	7	Juan Manuel Leguizamón
BF	6	Juan Martín Fernández Lobbe (c)
RL	5	Julio Farías Cabello	(substituted off) 64'
LL	4	Manuel Carizza
TP	3	Juan Figallo	(substituted off) 66'
HK	2	Eusebio Guiñazú	(substituted off) 48'
LP	1	Marcos Ayerza	(substituted off) 78'
Replacements:
HK	16	Agustín Creevy	(substituted on) 48'
HK	17	Bruno Postiglioni	(substituted on) 78'
PR	18	Juan Gómez	(substituted on) 66'
LK	19	Tomás Vallejos	(substituted on) 64'
FL	20	Tomás Leonardi	(substituted on) 56'
SH	21	Nicolás Vergallo	(substituted on) 66'
WG	22	Horacio Agulla	(substituted on) 45'
FB	23	Joaquín Tuculet	(substituted on) 13'
Coach:
Santiago Phelan

Touch judges:
George Clancy (Ireland)
Dudley Phillips (Ireland)
Television match official:
Jim Yuille (Scotland)

Notes:

- Argentina's victory came exactly 11 years after their last win over Wales at the Millennium Stadium.

10 November 2012
17:30 WET/GMT+0 (UTC+0)

Ireland	12–16	South Africa
Pen: Sexton (4/6) 6', 10', 20', 30'	Report	Try: Pienaar 44' c Con: Lambie (1/1) 44'; Pen: Lambie (3/6) 17', 51', 69'

Aviva Stadium, Dublin
Attendance: 49,781
Referee: Wayne Barnes (England)

Team details

FB	15	Simon Zebo
RW	14	Tommy Bowe
OC	13	Keith Earls
IC	12	Gordon D'Arcy		(substituted off) 75'
LW	11	Andrew Trimble		(substituted off) 58'
FH	10	Johnny Sexton
SH	9	Conor Murray		(substituted off) 61'
N8	8	Jamie Heaslip (c)	(yellow card) 42' to 52'
OF	7	Chris Henry
BF	6	Peter O'Mahony		(substituted off) 70'
RL	5	Mike McCarthy				(substituted off) 70'
LL	4	Donnacha Ryan		63' to 67'
TP	3	Mike Ross		(substituted off) 70'
HK	2	Richardt Strauss		3' to 10'		(substituted off) 75'
LP	1	Cian Healy		41' to 45'
Replacements:
HK	16	Seán Cronin		(substituted on) 3'	(substituted off) 10'	(substituted on) 75'
PR	17	Dave Kilcoyne		(substituted on) 41'	(substituted off) 45'
PR	18	Michael Bent		(substituted on) 70'
LK	19	Donncha O'Callaghan		(substituted on) 63'	(substituted off) 67'	(substituted on) 70'
FL	20	Iain Henderson		(substituted on) 70'
SH	21	Eoin Reddan		(substituted on) 61'
FH	22	Ronan O'Gara		(substituted on) 75'
WG	23	Fergus McFadden		(substituted on) 58'
Coach:
Declan Kidney

FB	15	Zane Kirchner
RW	14	JP Pietersen	(yellow card) 31' to 41'
OC	13	Jaco Taute
IC	12	Jean de Villiers (c)
LW	11	Francois Hougaard
FH	10	Pat Lambie
SH	9	Ruan Pienaar
N8	8	Duane Vermeulen
OF	7	Willem Alberts		(substituted off) 64'
BF	6	Francois Louw
RL	5	Juandré Kruger
LL	4	Eben Etzebeth		(substituted off) 75'
TP	3	Jannie du Plessis		(substituted off) 55'
HK	2	Adriaan Strauss
LP	1	CJ van der Linde		(substituted off) 63'
Replacements:
HK	16	Schalk Brits
PR	17	Heinke van der Merwe		(substituted on) 63'
PR	18	Pat Cilliers		(substituted on) 55'
LK	19	Flip van der Merwe		(substituted on) 70'
FL	20	Marcell Coetzee		(substituted on) 64'
FH	21	Morné Steyn
CE	22	Juan de Jongh
WG	23	Lwazi Mvovo
Coach:
Heyneke Meyer

Touch judges:
Steve Walsh (Australia)
Luke Pierce (England)
Television match official:
Giulio De Santis (Italy)

Notes:

- Michael Bent, Iain Henderson, Dave Kilcoyne and Richardt Strauss (all Ireland) made their full international debuts.
- The starting hookers, Adriaan (South Africa) and Richardt Strauss (Ireland), are cousins, the latter qualifying on residency grounds.
- Ronan O'Gara (Ireland) earned his 127th international cap (125 with Ireland and 2 with the British and Irish Lions) and overtook Brian O'Driscoll as the sole second most-capped player in rugby union history behind Australia's George Gregan (139).

10 November 2012
20:45 CET/GMT+01 (UTC+01)

France	33–6	Australia
Try: Picamoles 12' c Fofana 54' c Penalty try 63' c Con: Michalak (3/3) 13', 55', 64'; Pen: Michalak (2/2) 4', 36'; Parra (1/1) 75'; Drop: Michalak 39'	Report	Pen: Harris (2/2) 8', 21'

Stade de France, Saint-Denis
Attendance: 65,000
Referee: Nigel Owens (Wales)

Team details

FB	15	Brice Dulin
RW	14	Wesley Fofana
OC	13	Florian Fritz	(substituted off) 60'
IC	12	Maxime Mermoz
LW	11	Vincent Clerc
FH	10	Frédéric Michalak	(substituted off) 74'
SH	9	Maxime Machenaud	(substituted off) 63'
N8	8	Louis Picamoles	(substituted off) 64'
OF	7	Fulgence Ouedraogo
BF	6	Yannick Nyanga	(substituted off) 68'
RL	5	Jocelino Suta
LL	4	Pascal Papé (c)
TP	3	Nicolas Mas	(substituted off) 59'
HK	2	Dimitri Szarzewski	(substituted off) 49'
LP	1	Yannick Forestier	(substituted off) 49'
Replacements:
HK	16	Benjamin Kayser	(substituted on) 49'
PR	17	Thomas Domingo	(substituted on) 49'
PR	18	Vincent Debaty	(substituted on) 59'
LK	19	Sébastien Vahaamahina	(substituted on) 68'
N8	20	Damien Chouly	(substituted on) 64'
SH	21	Morgan Parra	(substituted on) 63'
FH	22	François Trinh-Duc	(substituted on) 74'
WG	23	Yoann Huget	(substituted on) 60'
Coach:
Philippe Saint-André

FB	15	Mike Harris	(substituted off) 55'
RW	14	Adam Ashley-Cooper
OC	13	Ben Tapuai
IC	12	Pat McCabe
LW	11	Nick Cummins
FH	10	Kurtley Beale
SH	9	Nick Phipps
N8	8	Wycliff Palu	(substituted off) 59'
OF	7	Michael Hooper
BF	6	Dave Dennis	(substituted off) 69'
RL	5	Nathan Sharpe (c)	(substituted off) 65'
LL	4	Kane Douglas
TP	3	Sekope Kepu			(substituted off) 49'
HK	2	Tatafu Polota-Nau	(substituted off) 59'
LP	1	Benn Robinson	28' to 36'		(substituted off) 65'
Replacements:
HK	16	Stephen Moore	(substituted on) 59'
PR	17	James Slipper	(substituted on) 28'	(substituted off) 36'	(substituted on) 49'
PR	18	Paddy Ryan			(substituted on) 65'
LK	19	Rob Simmons	(substituted on) 65'
N8	20	Radike Samo	(substituted on) 59'
FL	21	Liam Gill	(substituted on) 69'
SH	22	Brett Sheehan
FH	23	Berrick Barnes	(substituted on) 55'
Coach:
(New Zealand) Robbie Deans

Touch judges:
John Lacey (Ireland)
Neil Paterson (Scotland)
Television match official:
Nigel Whitehouse (Wales)

Notes:

- Yannick Forestier, Jocelino Suta, Sébastien Vahaamahina (all France) and Paddy Ryan (Australia) made their international debuts.
- This match ended Australia's seven-year winning streak against France, France's previous victory against Australia dating back to 5 November 2005 (26–16).
- The French came within one point of their largest ever victory against Australia (34–6 in 1976).

11 November 2012
14:30 WET/GMT+0 (UTC+0)

Scotland	22–51	New Zealand
Try: Visser 12' c, 50' m Cross 40' c Con: Laidlaw (2/3) 13', 40'; Pen: Laidlaw (1/1) 24'	Report	Try: Dagg 18' c Savea 29' c, 62' c Jane 33' c Hore 37' c Smith 75' c Con: Carter (6/6) 19', 31', 34', 39', 64', 77'; Pen: Carter (3/4) 1', 28', 53'

Murrayfield Stadium, Edinburgh
Attendance: 67,144
Referee: Jérôme Garcès (France)

Team details

FB	15	Stuart Hogg
RW	14	Sean Lamont
OC	13	Nick De Luca	(substituted off) 64'
IC	12	Matt Scott
LW	11	Tim Visser
FH	10	Greig Laidlaw	(substituted off) 65'
SH	9	Mike Blair	(substituted off) 75'
N8	8	Kelly Brown (c)
OF	7	Ross Rennie	(substituted off) 19'
BF	6	Alasdair Strokosch
RL	5	Jim Hamilton	(substituted off) 58'
LL	4	Richie Gray
TP	3	Geoff Cross
HK	2	Ross Ford	(substituted off) 64'
LP	1	Ryan Grant	(substituted off) 65'
Replacements:
HK	16	Scott Lawson	(substituted on) 64'
PR	17	Allan Jacobsen	(substituted on) 65'
PR	18	Kyle Traynor
LK	19	Alastair Kellock	(substituted on) 58'
FL	20	Dave Denton	(substituted on) 19'
SH	21	Henry Pyrgos	(substituted on) 75'
FH	22	Ruaridh Jackson	(substituted on) 65'
WG	23	Max Evans	(substituted on) 64'
Coach:
(England) Andy Robinson

FB	15	Israel Dagg		(substituted off) 26'
RW	14	Cory Jane
OC	13	Ben Smith
IC	12	Tamati Ellison
LW	11	Julian Savea
FH	10	Dan Carter
SH	9	Piri Weepu		(substituted off) 61'
N8	8	Victor Vito
OF	7	Richie McCaw (c)
BF	6	Adam Thomson	(yellow card) 44' to 54'
RL	5	Sam Whitelock		(substituted off) 67'
LL	4	Luke Romano
TP	3	Owen Franks		(substituted off) 61'
HK	2	Andrew Hore		(substituted off) 61'
LP	1	Wyatt Crockett		(substituted off) 72'
Replacements:
HK	16	Dane Coles		(substituted on) 61'
PR	17	Tony Woodcock		(substituted on) 72'
PR	18	Ben Franks		(substituted on) 61'
LK	19	Ali Williams		(substituted on) 67'
FL	20	Sam Cane
SH	21	Tawera Kerr-Barlow		(substituted on) 61'
FH	22	Beauden Barrett		(substituted on) 26'
CE	23	Ma'a Nonu
Coach:
Steve Hansen

Touch judges:
Pascal Gaüzère (France)
Simon McDowell (Ireland)
Television match official:
Graham Hughes (England)

Notes:

- Henry Pyrgos (Scotland), Dane Coles and Tawera Kerr-Barlow (both New Zealand) made their international debuts.
- Scotland became the first team to score three tries against New Zealand since New Zealand's loss to Australia in August 2011.

11 November 2012
17:30 UYST (UTC-3)

Uruguay	25–32	Portugal
Try: Martínez 7 m Penalty Try 25' c Mieres 61' c Con: Etcheverry (2/3) 26', 62'; Pen: Etcheverry (2/4) 42', 48'	Report	Try: Aguilar 14' m Uva 38' c Le Roux 65' c Gonçalo Foro 70' c Con: Leal (3/4) 39', 66', 71'; Pen: Leal (2/2) 10', 28'

Estadio Charrúa, Montevideo
Referee: Juan Sylvestre (Argentina)

Team details

FB	15	Jerónimo Etcheverry
RW	14	Francisco Bulanti	(substituted off) 65'
OC	13	Rodrigo Martinez
IC	12	Santiago Gibernau	(substituted off) 65'
LW	11	Gastón Mieres
FH	10	Alejo Durán	(substituted off) 72'
SH	9	Francisco Vecino
N8	8	Juan Diego Ormaechea
OF	7	Diego Magno
BF	6	Alejandro Nieto
RL	5	Mathias Palomeque	(substituted off) 59'
LL	4	Cristofer Soares de Lima	(substituted off) 53'
TP	3	Mario Sagario	(substituted off) 72'
HK	2	Nicolás Klappenbach (c)	(substituted off) 53'
LP	1	Alejo Corral	(substituted on) 59'
Replacements:
HK	16	Arturo Ávalo	(substituted on) 53'
PR	17	Óscar Durán	(substituted on) 72'
PR	18	Juan Rombys	(substituted on) 59'
LK	19	Juan De Freitas	(substituted on) 53'
FL	20	Santiago Vilaseca	(substituted on) 59'
CE	21	Alberto Román	(substituted on) 65'
FH	22	Rodrigo Silva	(substituted on) 72'
WG	23	Leandro Leivas	(substituted on) 65'
Coach:
Pablo Lemoine

FB	15	Nuno Penha e Costa
RW	14	António Aguilar
OC	13	Carl Murray	(substituted off) 72'
IC	12	Alex de Barros
LW	11	Gonçalo Foro
FH	10	Pedro Leal
SH	9	Samuel Marques
N8	8	Laurent Balangué
OF	7	Tiago Girão
BF	6	Jacques Le Roux
RL	5	Gonçalo Uva (c)
LL	4	David dos Reis	(substituted off) 57'
TP	3	Anthony Alves
HK	2	João Correia	(substituted off) 48'
LP	1	Francisco Fernandes	(substituted off) 48'
Replacements:
HK	16	Mike Tadjer	(substituted on) 48'
PR	17	Jorge Segurado	(substituted on) 48'
PR	18	Jose Leal da Costa
LK	19	Eric dos Santos	(substituted on) 57'
FL	20	Francisco Sousa
SH	21	Francisco Magalhães
CE	22	José Lima	(substituted on) 72'
WG	23	Wilfried Rodrigues
Coach:
(New Zealand) Errol Brain

Touch judges:
Felipe Balbontin (Chile)
Henrique Platais (Brazil)

=== 13 November ===
13 November 2012
19:30 WET/GMT+0 (UTC+0)

Leicester Tigers (England)	32–24	Māori All Blacks
Try: Morris 17' c Thompstone 29' c Con: Ford (2/2) 18', 30'; Pen: Ford (6/7) 2', 8', 12', 22', 43', 66'	Report	Try: Wilson 5' c Bateman 39' c Ngatai 63' c Con: Ripia (3/3) 6', 40', 64'; Pen: Ripia (1/3) 33'

Welford Road, Leicester
Attendance: 17,206
Referee: Andrew Small (England)

Team details

FB	O	(England) Mathew Tait
RW	N	(Ireland) Niall Morris
OC	M	(England) Matt Smith		(substituted off) 53'
IC	L	(England) Anthony Allen
LW	K	(England) Adam Thompstone		(substituted off) 65'
FH	J	(England) George Ford
SH	I	(Australia) Patrick Phibbs		(substituted off) 60'
N8	G	(England) Jordan Crane		(substituted off) 73'
OF	H	(Australia) Julian Salvi
BF	F	(England) Ed Slater
RL	E	(England) Graham Kitchener
LL	D	(England) Louis Deacon (c)
TP	C	(England) Fraser Balmain
HK	B	(England) George Chuter		(substituted off) 65'
LP	A	(England) Boris Stankovich
Replacements:
PR	P	(England) Jonny Harris
HK	Q	(England) Jimmy Stevens		(substituted on) 65'
PR	R	(England) Kieran Brookes
FL	S	(Ireland) Michael Noone
N8	T	(England) Richard Thorpe		(substituted on) 73'
SH	U	(England) Sam Harrison		(substituted on) 60'
CE	V	(New Zealand) Daniel Bowden	(yellow card) 57' to 67'	(substituted on) 53'
CE	W	(England) Andy Forsyth		(substituted on) 65'
Coach:
Richard Cockerill

FB	15	Andre Taylor	(yellow card) 11' to 21'
RW	14	Kurt Baker
OC	13	Charlie Ngatai		(substituted off) 65'
IC	12	Tim Bateman
LW	11	Kade Poki		(substituted off) 64'
FH	10	Willie Ripia
SH	9	Frae Wilson		(substituted off) 57'
N8	8	Elliot Dixon		(substituted off) 57'
OF	7	Tanerau Latimer (c)
BF	6	Shane Christie
RL	5	Jason Eaton
LL	4	Jarrad Hoeata	(yellow card) 62' to 72'	(substituted off) 72'
TP	3	Ben Afeaki		(substituted off) 68'
HK	2	Hika Elliot		(substituted off) 68'
LP	1	Ben May		(substituted off) 57'
Replacements:
HK	16	Quentin MacDonald		(substituted on) 68'
PR	17	Jacob Ellison		(substituted on) 57'
PR	18	Bronson Murray		(substituted on) 68'
LK	19	Romana Graham		(substituted on) 72'
FL	20	Nick Crosswell		(substituted on) 57'
SH	21	Jamison Gibson-Park		(substituted on) 57'
CE	22	Jackson Willison		(substituted on) 65'
WG	23	Declan O'Donnell		(substituted on) 64'
Coach:
Jamie Joseph

Touch judges:
Ian Tempest (England)
Paul Dix (England))

Notes:

- The Tigers returned to using their traditional lettered-flocked jerseys for this non-test match. They last used this system when they hosted Australia in 2010.

13 November 2012
19:45 WET/GMT+0 (UTC+0)

Gloucester (England)	31–29	Fiji
Try: Cox 35' c Penalty try 55' c, 62' c Britton 74' c Con: Robson (4/4) 36', 56', 63', 75; Pen: Robson (1/3) 67'	Report	Try: Tuapati 19' m Matanavou 32' c Votu 44' m Con: Ralulu (1/3) 33'; Pen: Ralulu (4/6) 6', 23', 58', 66'

Kingsholm, Gloucester
Attendance: 8,147
Referee: JP Doyle (England)

Team details

FB	15	(Wales) Martyn Thomas
RW	14	(Wales) Steph Reynolds
OC	13	(England) Drew Locke	(substituted off) 75'
IC	12	(New Zealand) Tim Molenaar
LW	11	(England) Ian Clark
FH	10	(England) Dan Robson
SH	9	(England) Dave Lewis	(substituted off) 64'
N8	8	(England) Peter Buxton (c)
OF	7	(England) Matthew Cox	(substituted off) 61'
BF	6	(England) Ross Moriarty
RL	5	(England) Harry Casson
LL	4	(England) Will Graulich
TP	3	(Italy) Dario Chistolini	(substituted off) 55'
HK	2	(England) Koree Britton	(substituted off) 77'
LP	1	(England) Yann Thomas	(substituted off) 67'
Replacements:
PR	16	(Italy) Tommaso D'Apice	(substituted on) 55'
HK	17	(England) Dan Murphy	(substituted on) 77'
PR	18	(England) Tom Heard	(substituted on) 67'
FL	19	(England) Ed King
N8	20	(England) Benjamin Sparks	(substituted on) 61'
SH	21	(England) Brad Field	(substituted on) 64'
CE	22	(New Zealand) George Boulton	(substituted on) 75'
FB	23	(England) Steffan Hawley
Coach:
(Wales) Nigel Davies

FB	15	Metuisela Talebula
RW	14	Timoci Matanavou
OC	13	Samu Wara
IC	12	Josh Matavesi		(substituted off) 59'
LW	11	Watisoni Votu
FH	10	Jonetani Ralulu
SH	9	Kelemedi Bola		(substituted off) 69'
N8	8	Nemani Nagusa	(yellow card) 62' to 72'
OF	7	Samu Bola
BF	6	Josefa Domolailai		(substituted off) 72'
RL	5	Sekonaia Kalou		(substituted off) 72'
LL	4	Api Ratuniyarawa
TP	3	Manasa Saulo Ramumu		(substituted off) 49'
HK	2	Tuapati Talemaitoga		(substituted off) 49'
LP	1	Setefano Somoca (c)		(substituted off) 65'
Replacements:
HK	16	Seremaia Naureuere		(substituted on) 49'
PR	17	Deacon Manu		(substituted on) 59'
PR	18	Penijamini Makutu	(yellow card) 55' to 65'	(substituted on) 49'
LK	19	Apisai Naikatini		(substituted on) 72'
FL	20	Iliesa Ratuva		(substituted on) 72'
SH	21	Nikola Matawalu		(substituted on) 69'
CE	22	Ravai Fatiaki		(substituted on) 65'
WG	23	Aisea Natoga
Coach:
Inoke Male

Touch judges:
Robin Goodliffe (England)
Greg Garner (England)

13 November 2012
19:45 WET/GMT+0 (UTC+0)

Newcastle Falcons (England)	24–13	Tonga
Try: MacLeod 27' c Penalty try 57' c Wilson 65' c Con: Hodgson (3/3) 28', 58', 66'; Pen: Hodgson (1/2) 78'	Report	Try: Fono 6' m Helu 77' m Con: Paea (0/2); Pen: Paea (1/1) 43'

Kingston Park, Newcastle
Attendance: 3,389
Referee: Sean Davey (England)

Team details

FB	15	(England) Alex Tait
RW	14	(England) Andrew Higgins
OC	13	(England) Alex Crockett (c)
IC	12	(England) James Fitzpatrick	(substituted off) 68'
LW	11	(New Zealand) Ryan Shortland
FH	10	(England) Joel Hodgson	(substituted off) 78'
SH	9	(Wales) Warren Fury
N8	8	(England) Chris York
OF	7	(England) Mark Wilson
BF	6	(Scotland) Scott MacLeod	(substituted off) 78'
RL	5	(Wales) James Goode
LL	4	(Scotland) Sean Tomes
TP	3	(England) James Hall	(substituted off) 78'
HK	2	(England) Matt Thompson	(substituted off) 68'
LP	1	(Scotland) Grant Shiells	(substituted off) 78'
Replacements:
PR	16	(New Zealand) Michael Mayhew	(substituted on) 68'
HK	17	(England) Scott Wilson	(substituted on) 78'
PR	18	(England) James Hallam	(substituted on) 78'
FL	19	(England) Joe Robinson	(substituted on) 78'
SH	20	(England) Jordi Pasqualin
FH	21	(Fiji) Waisea Luveniyali	(substituted on) 78'
CE	22	(Samoa) Jamie Helleur	(substituted on) 68'
FL	23	(Scotland) Ally Hogg
Coach:
Dean Richards

FB	15	Sitaleki Luʻau	(substituted off) 64'
RW	14	Mateo Malupo
OC	13	William Helu
IC	12	Alipate Fatafehi
LW	11	Apakuki Maʻafu
FH	10	Eddie Paea
SH	9	Viliame Iongi
N8	8	Uamano Fono	(substituted off) 68'
OF	7	Nili Latu (c)
BF	6	Hale T-Pole
RL	5	Sione Timani	(substituted off) 56'
LL	4	Josh Afu
TP	3	Tevita Mailau
HK	2	Aleki Lutui	(substituted off) 68'
LP	1	Soane Tongaʻuiha	(substituted off) 56'
Replacements:
HK	16	Kamaliele Sakalia	(substituted on) 68'
PR	17	Kisi Pulu
LK	18	Samisoni Fifita Masima	(substituted on) 56'
FL	19	Sione Vaiomoʻunga	(substituted on) 68'
SH	20	Taniela Moa
CE	21	Suka Hufanga
FB	22	Vunga Lilo	(substituted on) 64'
PR	23	Sona Taumalolo	(substituted on) 56'
Coach:
Mana Otai

Touch judges:
Steve Lee (England)
Darryl Chapman (England)

=== 16/17 November ===
16 November 2012
19:30 WET/GMT+0 (UTC+0)

Wales	19–26	Samoa
Try: Beck 32' c Con: Halfpenny (1/1) 33'; Pen: Halfpenny (4/5) 15', 28', 49', 61	Report	Try: Autagavaia 1' c G. Pisi 46' m Leota 77' m Con: T. Pisi (1/3) 2'; Pen: T. Pisi (3/6) 40', 56', 65'

Millennium Stadium, Cardiff
Attendance: 44,329
Referee: Pascal Gaüzère (France)

Team details

FB	15	Leigh Halfpenny
RW	14	Alex Cuthbert
OC	13	Ashley Beck
IC	12	Jamie Roberts
LW	11	George North
FH	10	Dan Biggar	(substituted off) 37'
SH	9	Mike Phillips
N8	8	Taulupe Faletau
OF	7	Justin Tipuric
BF	6	Ryan Jones (c)	(substituted off) 70'
RL	5	Ian Evans	(substituted off) 40'
LL	4	Bradley Davies
TP	3	Aaron Jarvis	(substituted off) 76'
HK	2	Richard Hibbard	(substituted off) 17'
LP	1	Paul James	(substituted off) 61'
Replacements:
HK	16	Ken Owens	(substituted on) 17'
PR	17	Gethin Jenkins	(substituted on) 61'
PR	18	Scott Andrews	(substituted on) 76'
LK	19	Luke Charteris	(substituted on) 40'
FL	20	Sam Warburton	(substituted on) 70'
SH	21	Tavis Knoyle
FH	22	Rhys Priestland	(substituted on) 37'
CE	23	Scott Williams
Coach:
Rob Howley

FB	15	Fa'atoina Autagavaia
RW	14	Paul Perez
OC	13	George Pisi
IC	12	Paul Williams	54' to 69'		(substituted off) 74'
LW	11	David Lemi (c)
FH	10	Tusi Pisi	(substituted off) 78'
SH	9	Kahn Fotuali'i
N8	8	Tai Tu'ifua
OF	7	Maurie Fa'asavalu
BF	6	Ofisa Treviranus	(substituted off) 69'
RL	5	Filo Paulo	(substituted off) 59'
LL	4	Daniel Leo
TP	3	Census Johnston	(substituted off) 48'
HK	2	Ole Avei	(substituted off) 57'
LP	1	Sakaria Taulafo
Replacements:
HK	16	Ti'i Paulo	(substituted on) 57'
PR	17	Viliamu Afatia
PR	18	James Johnston	(substituted on) 48'
LK	19	Joe Tekori	(substituted on) 59'
FL	20	Tivani Fomai	(substituted on) 69'
SH	21	Jeremy Su'a	(substituted on) 78'
CE	22	Johnny Leota	(substituted on) 54'	(substituted off) 69'	(substituted on) 74'
WG	23	Robert Lilomaiava
Coach:
Stephen Betham

Touch judges:
Wayne Barnes (England)
Jérôme Garcès (France)
Television match official:
Giulio De Santis (Italy)

17 November 2012
15:00 GET (UTC+4)

Georgia	22–25	Japan
Try: Kvirikashvili 52' c Con: Kvirikashvili (1/1) 52'; Pen: Kvirikashvili (5/6) 5', 7', 13', 43', 50'	Report	Try: Onozowa 40' c Con: Goromaru (1/1) 40'; Pen: Goromaru (5/5) 25', 35', 56', 66', 72'; Drop: Ono 80'

Mikheil Meskhi Stadium, Tbilisi
Attendance: 15,000
Referee: Glen Jackson (New Zealand)

Team details

FB	15	Irakli Kiasashvili
RW	14	Irakli Machkhaneli
OC	13	Davit Kacharava
IC	12	Merab Sharikadze		(substituted off) 69'
LW	11	Sandro Todua
FH	10	Merab Kvirikashvili		(substituted off) 67'
SH	9	Irakli Abuseridze (c)		(substituted off) 67'
N8	8	Mamuka Gorgodze
OF	7	Vito Kolelishvili	(yellow card) 35' to 45'
BF	6	Shalva Sutiashvili
RL	5	Levan Datunashvili		(substituted off) 67'
LL	4	Giorgi Nemsadze		(substituted off) 59'
TP	3	Davit Zirakashvili		(substituted off) 54'
HK	2	Shalva Mamukashvili		(substituted off) 49'
LP	1	Davit Khinchagishvili		(substituted off) 59'
Replacements:
HK	16	Irakli Natriashvili		(substituted on) 49'
PR	17	Mikheil Nariashvili		(substituted on) 58'
PR	18	Davit Kubriashvili		(substituted on) 54'
LK	19	Vakhtang Maisuradze		(substituted on) 58'
SH	20	Giorgi Begadze		(substituted on) 67'
FL	21	Giorgi Tkhilaishvili		(substituted on) 67'
FH	22	Lasha Khmaladze		(substituted on) 67'
CE	23	Tedo Zibzibadze		(substituted on) 69'
Coach:
(New Zealand) Milton Haig

FB	15	Ayumu Goromaru
RW	14	Toshiaki Hirose (c)
OC	13	Tomohiro Senba	(substituted off) 58'
IC	12	Harumichi Tatekawa
LW	11	Hirotoki Onozowa
FH	10	Kosei Ono
SH	9	Fumiaki Tanaka	(substituted off) 67'
N8	8	Takashi Kikutani
OF	7	Michael Leitch
BF	6	Hendrick Tui	(substituted off) 52'
RL	5	Luke Thompson	(substituted off) 52'
LL	4	Hitoshi Ono
TP	3	Kensuke Hatakeyama	(substituted off) 58'
HK	2	Shota Horie
LP	1	Yusuke Nagae
Replacements:
HK	16	Haruki Ota
PR	17	Takuma Asahara
PR	18	Hiroshi Yamashita	(substituted on) 58'
LK	19	Michael Broadhurst	(substituted on) 52'
FL	20	Koliniasi Holani	(substituted on) 52'
SH	21	Atsushi Hiwasa	(substituted on) 67'
FH	22	Yuu Tamura
CE	23	Go Aruga	(substituted on) 58'
Coach:
(Australia) Eddie Jones

Touch judges:
Vlad Iordachescu (Romania)
Radu Petrescu (Romania)

17 November 2012
12:05 WET/GMT+0 (UTC+0)

RFU Championship XV (England)	21–52	Māori All Blacks
Try: Mama 22' m Crane 78' c Con: Roberts (0/1); Sharp (1/1) 79'; Pen: Roberts (3/5) 4', 11', 42'	Report	Try: O'Donnell 14' c Baker 28' c Elliot 33' c Renata 53' c Dixon 56' m Wilson 63' c Graham 72' c Willison 75' m Con: Ripia (5/7) 15', 29', 34', 64', 73'; Renata (1/1) 54'

Castle Park, Doncaster
Attendance: 4,956
Referee: David Rose (England)

Team details

FB	15	(Zimbabwe) Dante Mama
RW	14	(England) Rhys Crane
OC	13	(England) Tim Streather
IC	12	(England) Charlie Hayter
LW	11	(England) Josh Bassett
FH	10	(England) Tristan Roberts	(substituted off) 69'
SH	9	(Wales) Gavin Cattle (c)	(substituted off) 54'
N8	8	(England) Ben Pienaar
OF	7	(England) Phil Burgess	(substituted off) 56'
BF	6	(England) Jacob Rowan
RL	5	(England) Nic Rouse
LL	4	(England) Nathan Hannay	(substituted off) 49'
TP	3	(England) Alan Paver	(substituted off) 49'
HK	2	(England) Jon Vickers	(substituted off) 71'
LP	1	(England) Mark Irish	(substituted off) 56'
Replacements:
HK	16	(England) Mark Stagg	(substituted on) 71'
PR	17	(Wales) Tom Davies	(substituted on) 56'
PR	18	(England) Oliver Tomaszczyk	(substituted on) 49'
LK	19	(England) Calum Green	(substituted on) 49'
N8	20	(England) Row Burrows	(substituted on) 56'
SH	21	(England) Luke Baldwin	(substituted on) 54'
FH	22	(England) Jake Sharp	(substituted on) 69'
WG	23	(England) Mark Atkinson
Coach:
Mike Rayer

FB	15	Trent Renata
RW	14	Kurt Baker
OC	13	Jackson Willison
IC	12	Tim Bateman	(substituted off) 44'
LW	11	Declan O'Donnell
FH	10	Willie Ripia
SH	9	Jamison Gibson-Park	(substituted off) 61'
N8	8	Elliot Dixon
OF	7	Tanerau Latimer (c)
BF	6	Nick Crosswell	(substituted off) 46'
RL	5	Romana Graham
LL	4	Jarrad Hoeata	(substituted off) 54'
TP	3	Ben Afeaki
HK	2	Hika Elliot	(substituted off) 54'
LP	1	Jacob Ellison	(substituted off) 46'
Replacements:
HK	16	Quentin MacDonald	(substituted on) 54'
PR	17	Bronson Murray
PR	18	Ben May	(substituted on) 46'
LK	19	Jason Eaton	(substituted on) 54'
FL	20	Shane Christie	(substituted on) 46'
SH	21	Frae Wilson	(substituted on) 61'
CE	22	Charlie Ngatai	(substituted on) 44'
FB	23	Andre Taylor
Coach:
Jamie Joseph

Touch judges:
Steve Lee (England)
Simon McConnell (England)
Television match official:
Trevor Fisher (England)

17 November 2012
15:00 CET/GMT+01 (UTC+1)

Italy	10–42	New Zealand
Try: Sgarbi 25' c Con: Orquera (1/1) 26'; Drop: Orquera 52'	Report	Try: Read 16' c Nonu 49' c Jane 67' c Savea 73' m, 75' c Con: Cruden (4/5) 16', 50', 68', 76'; Pen: Cruden (3/3) 12', 19', 44'

Stadio Olimpico, Rome
Attendance: 73,000
Referee: Alain Rolland (Ireland)

Team details

FB	15	Andrea Masi	(substituted off) 61'
RW	14	Giovanbattista Venditti
OC	13	Tommaso Benvenuti
IC	12	Alberto Sgarbi
LW	11	Mirco Bergamasco
FH	10	Luciano Orquera
SH	9	Edoardo Gori	(substituted off) 56'
N8	8	Sergio Parisse (c)
OF	7	Simone Favaro	(substituted off) 48'
BF	6	Alessandro Zanni	(substituted off) 65'
RL	5	Francesco Minto
LL	4	Antonio Pavanello	(substituted off) 60'
TP	3	Martin Castrogiovanni	(substituted off) 56'
HK	2	Leonardo Ghiraldini	(substituted off) 50'
LP	1	Andrea Lo Cicero	(substituted off) 50'
Replacements:
HK	16	Davide Giazzon	(substituted on) 50'
PR	17	Alberto de Marchi	(substituted on) 50'
PR	18	Lorenzo Cittadini	(substituted on) 56'
LK	19	Quintin Geldenhuys	(substituted on) 60'
FL	20	Mauro Bergamasco	(substituted on) 65'
N8	21	Robert Barbieri	(substituted on) 48'
SH	22	Tobias Botes	(substituted on) 56'
FB	23	Luke McLean	(substituted on) 61'
Coach:
(France) Jacques Brunel

FB	15	Beauden Barrett	(substituted off) 54'
RW	14	Hosea Gear
OC	13	Conrad Smith
IC	12	Ma'a Nonu
LW	11	Julian Savea
FH	10	Aaron Cruden
SH	9	Aaron Smith	(substituted off) 63'
N8	8	Kieran Read (c)
OF	7	Sam Cane
BF	6	Liam Messam
RL	5	Brodie Retallick
LL	4	Ali Williams	(substituted off) 50'
TP	3	Charlie Faumuina	(substituted off) 46'
HK	2	Keven Mealamu	(substituted off) 42'
LP	1	Tony Woodcock	(substituted off) 64'
Replacements:
HK	16	Dane Coles	(substituted on) 42'
PR	17	Wyatt Crockett	(substituted on) 64'
PR	18	Ben Franks	(substituted on) 46'
FL	19	Sam Whitelock	(substituted on) 50'
N8	20	Victor Vito
SH	21	Tawera Kerr-Barlow	(substituted on) 63'
FH	22	Dan Carter
WG	23	Cory Jane	(substituted on) 54'
Coach:
Steve Hansen

Touch judges:
Craig Joubert (South Africa)
Peter Allan (Scotland)
Television match official:
Nigel Whitehouse (Wales)

17 November 2012
14:30 WET/GMT+0 (UTC+0)

England	14–20	Australia
Try: Tuilagi 38' m Pen: Floos (3/3) 2', 23', 33'	Report	Try: Cummins 34' m Pen: Barnes (4/5) 30', 43', 49', 52'; Drop: Barnes 12'

Twickenham Stadium, London
Attendance: 81,361
Referee: Romain Poite (France)

Team details

FB	15	Alex Goode
RW	14	Chris Ashton
OC	13	Manu Tuilagi
IC	12	Brad Barritt	(substituted off) 73'
LW	11	Charlie Sharples	(substituted off) 60'
FH	10	Toby Flood
SH	9	Danny Care	(substituted off) 60'
N8	8	Thomas Waldrom
OF	7	Chris Robshaw (c)
BF	6	Tom Johnson	(substituted off) 49'
RL	5	Geoff Parling
LL	4	Tom Palmer	(substituted off) 53'
TP	3	Dan Cole
HK	2	Tom Youngs	(substituted off) 73'
LP	1	Joe Marler	(substituted off) 49'
Replacements:
HK	16	David Paice	(substituted on) 73'
PR	17	David Wilson
PR	18	Mako Vunipola	(substituted on) 49'
LK	19	Joe Launchbury	(substituted on) 53'
FL	20	Tom Wood	(substituted on) 49'
SH	21	Ben Youngs	(substituted on) 60'
CE	22	Owen Farrell	(substituted on) 73'
WG	23	Mike Brown	(substituted on) 60'
Coach:
Stuart Lancaster

FB	15	Berrick Barnes
RW	14	Digby Ioane	(substituted off) 69'
OC	13	Adam Ashley-Cooper
IC	12	Ben Tapuai
LW	11	Nick Cummins
FH	10	Kurtley Beale
SH	9	Nick Phipps
N8	8	Wycliff Palu
OF	7	Michael Hooper
BF	6	Dave Dennis	55' to 66'		(substituted off) 76'
RL	5	Nathan Sharpe (c)
LL	4	Sitaleki Timani
TP	3	Ben Alexander	(substituted off) 70'
HK	2	Tatafu Polota-Nau	(substituted off) 40'
LP	1	Benn Robinson	(substituted off) 60'
Replacements:
HK	16	Stephen Moore	(substituted on) 40'
PR	17	James Slipper	(substituted on) 60'
PR	18	Sekope Kepu	(substituted on) 70'
N8	19	Radike Samo
FL	20	Liam Gill	(substituted on) 55'	(substituted off) 66'	(substituted on) 76'
SH	21	Brett Sheehan
CE	22	Mike Harris
WG	23	Drew Mitchell	(substituted on) 69'
Coach:
(New Zealand) Robbie Deans

Touch judges:
Nigel Owens (Wales)
Mathieu Raynal (France)
Television match official:
Jim Yuille (Scotland)

17 November 2012
14:30 WET/GMT+0 (UTC+0)

Scotland	10–21	South Africa
Try: Pyrgos 50' c Con: Laidlaw (1/1) 51'; Pen: Laidlaw (1/2) 9'	Report	Try: Strauss 20' m, 45' c Con: Lambie (1/2) 46'; Pen: Lambie (3/3) 6', 13', 31'

Murrayfield Stadium, Edinburgh
Attendance: 58,893
Referee: George Clancy (Ireland)

Team details

FB	15	Stuart Hogg
RW	14	Sean Lamont
OC	13	Nick De Luca
IC	12	Matt Scott
LW	11	Tim Visser
FH	10	Greig Laidlaw	(substituted off) 68'
SH	9	Mike Blair	(substituted off) 47'
N8	8	Dave Denton
OF	7	John Barclay
BF	6	Kelly Brown (c)
RL	5	Jim Hamilton
LL	4	Richie Gray	(substituted off) 22'
TP	3	Euan Murray	(substituted off) 68'
HK	2	Ross Ford	(substituted off) 68'
LP	1	Ryan Grant
Replacements:
HK	16	Dougie Hall	(substituted on) 68'
PR	17	Kyle Traynor
PR	18	Geoff Cross	(substituted on) 68'
LK	19	Alastair Kellock	(substituted on) 22'
N8	20	Stuart McInally
SH	21	Henry Pyrgos	(substituted on) 47'
WG	22	Ruaridh Jackson	(substituted on) 68'
FB	23	Peter Murchie
Coach:
(England) Andy Robinson

FB	15	Zane Kirchner
RW	14	JP Pietersen
OC	13	Juan de Jongh
IC	12	Jean de Villiers (c)
LW	11	Francois Hougaard
FH	10	Patrick Lambie		(substituted off) 73'
SH	9	Ruan Pienaar
N8	8	Duane Vermeulen
OF	7	Willem Alberts		(substituted off) 53'
BF	6	Francois Louw
RL	5	Juandré Kruger		(substituted off) 69'
LL	4	Eben Etzebeth
TP	3	Jannie du Plessis		(substituted off) 52'
HK	2	Adriaan Strauss		(substituted off) 76'
LP	1	Gurthrö Steenkamp		(substituted off) 61'
Replacements:
HK	16	Schalk Brits		(substituted on) 76'
PR	17	Heinke van der Merwe		(substituted on) 61'
PR	18	CJ van der Linde		(substituted on) 52'
LK	19	Flip van der Merwe	(yellow card) 76' to 80'	(substituted on) 69'
FL	20	Marcell Coetzee		(substituted on) 53'
FH	21	Morné Steyn		(substituted on) 73'
CE	22	Jaco Taute
WG	23	Lwazi Mvovo
Coach:
Heyneke Meyer

Touch judges:
John Lacey (Ireland)
Cristophe Berdos (France)
Television match official:
Eric Gauzins (France)

17 November 2012
17:30 IST/GMT+0 (UTC+0)

Ireland XV	53–0	Fiji
Try: Gilroy 9 c, 67' m, 72' c McFadden 20' c, 43' c Cronin 21' c Cave 30' m Marshall 78' m Con: Jackson (5/8) 10', 20', 22', 43', 72'; Pen: Jackson (1/2) 6'	Report

Thomond Park, Limerick
Attendance: 17,126
Referee: Leighton Hodges (Wales)

Team details

FB	15	Denis Hurley	(substituted off) 61'
RW	14	Fergus McFadden
OC	13	Darren Cave
IC	12	Luke Marshall
LW	11	Craig Gilroy
FH	10	Paddy Jackson
SH	9	Conor Murray		(substituted off) 61'
N8	8	Jamie Heaslip (c)		(substituted off) 75'
OF	7	John Muldoon		(substituted off) 43'
BF	6	Iain Henderson
RL	5	Dan Tuohy
LL	4	Donncha O'Callaghan
TP	3	Mike Ross		(substituted off) 52'
HK	2	Seán Cronin		(substituted off) 61'
LP	1	Dave Kilcoyne		(substituted off) 46'
Replacements:
HK	16	Richardt Strauss		(substituted on) 61'
PR	17	Cian Healy		(substituted on) 46'
PR	18	Michael Bent		(substituted on) 52'
LK	19	Mike McCarthy		(substituted on) 75'
FL	20	Chris Henry	(yellow card) 63' to 73'	(substituted on) 43'
SH	21	Paul Marshall		(substituted on) 61'
FH	22	Johnny Sexton
WG	23	Simon Zebo		(substituted on) 61'
Coach:
Declan Kidney

FB	15	Metuisela Talebula
RW	14	Simeli Koniferedi		(substituted off) 36'
OC	13	Vereniki Goneva
IC	12	Ravai Fatiaki		(substituted off) 41'
LW	11	Watisoni Votu
FH	10	Jonetani Ralulu
SH	9	Nikola Matawalu		(substituted off) 67'
N8	8	Nemani Nagusa		(substituted off) 60'
OF	7	Malakai Ravulo
BF	6	Iliesa Ratuva			(substituted off) 67'
RL	5	Api Naikatini
LL	4	Leone Nakarawa		(substituted off) 45'
TP	3	Deacon Manu (c)
HK	2	Viliame Veikoso		(substituted off) 45'	(substituted on) 67'
LP	1	Jerry Yanuyanutawa		(substituted off) 69'
Replacements:
PR	16	Tale Tuapati	(yellow card) 66' to 76'	(substituted on) 45'
HK	17	Manasa Saulo
PR	18	Setefano Somoca		(substituted on) 69'
LK	19	Apisalome Ratuniyarawa		(substituted on) 45'
FL	20	Josefa Domolailai		(substituted on) 60'
SH	21	Kelemedi Bola		(substituted on) 67'
CN	22	Saula Radidi		(substituted on) 36'
CN	23	Timoci Matanavou	(yellow card) 46' to 56'	(substituted on) 41'
Coach:
Inoke Male

Touch judges:
Neil Hennessy (Wales)
Sean Brickell (Wales)
Television match official:
Gareth Simmonds (Wales)

Notes:

- This was a non-capped match for Ireland, but was a fully capped match for Fiji. The IRB gave this match a no-test status, which means rankings would not change regardless of the outcome but will be part of the new scheme to increase competitiveness in Tier 2 teams ahead of the next World Cup.

17 November 2012
21:00 CET/GMT+01 (UTC+1)

France	39–22	Argentina
Try: Clerc 17' c, 21' c Nyanga 33' c Con: Michalak (3/3) 19', 21', 34'; Pen: Michalak (5/6) 3', 59', 67', 72', 77'; Drop: Michalak 46'	Report	Try: Bosch 4' c Con: Sánchez (1/1) 5'; Pen: Sánchez (4/5) 9', 13', 44', 55'; Drop: Sánchez 65'

Grand Stade Lille Métropole, Villeneuve d'Ascq
Attendance: 45,000
Referee: Steve Walsh (Australia)

Team details

FB	15	Brice Dulin	(substituted off) 68'
RW	14	Wesley Fofana
OC	13	Florian Fritz	(substituted off) 62'
IC	12	Maxime Mermoz
LW	11	Vincent Clerc
FH	10	Frédéric Michalak
SH	9	Maxime Machenaud	(substituted off) 56'
N8	8	Louis Picamoles	(substituted off) 73'
OF	7	Fulgence Ouedraogo
BF	6	Yannick Nyanga
RL	5	Yoann Maestri	(substituted off) 60'
LL	4	Pascal Papé (c)
TP	3	Nicolas Mas	(substituted off) 68'
HK	2	Dimitri Szarzewski	(substituted off) 50'
LP	1	Yannick Forestier	(substituted off) 50'
Replacements:
HK	16	Benjamin Kayser	(substituted on) 50'
PR	17	Thomas Domingo	(substituted on) 50'
PR	18	Vincent Debaty	(substituted on) 68'
LK	19	Jocelino Suta	(substituted on) 60'
N8	20	Damien Chouly	(substituted on) 73'
SH	21	Morgan Parra	(substituted on) 56'
FH	22	François Trinh-Duc	(substituted on) 68'
WG	23	Yoann Huget	(substituted on) 62'
Coach:
Philippe Saint-André

FB	15	Lucas González Amorosino
RW	14	Horacio Agulla	(substituted off) 73'
OC	13	Gonzalo Tiesi	(substituted off) 58'
IC	12	Marcelo Bosch
LW	11	Juan Imhoff
FH	10	Nicolás Sánchez
SH	9	Martín Landajo	(substituted off) 62'
N8	8	Leonardo Senatore	(substituted off) 50'
OF	7	Juan Manuel Leguizamón
BF	6	Juan Martín Fernández Lobbe (c)
RL	5	Julio Farías Cabello	(substituted off) 60'
LL	4	Manuel Carizza
TP	3	Juan Figallo	(substituted off) 60'
HK	2	Eusebio Guiñazú	(substituted off) 47'
LP	1	Marcos Ayerza	(substituted off) 72'
Replacements:
HK	16	Agustín Creevy	(substituted on) 47'
PR	17	Nahuel Lobo	(substituted on) 72'
PR	18	Francisco Gómez Kodela	(substituted on) 60'
LK	19	Tomás Vallejos	(substituted on) 60'
FL	20	Tomás de la Vega	(substituted on) 50'
SH	21	Tomás Cubelli	(substituted on) 62'
WG	22	Gonzalo Camacho	(substituted on) 58'
FB	23	Joaquín Tuculet	(substituted on) 73'
Coach:
Santiago Phelan

Touch judges:
Jaco Peyper (South Africa)
David Changleng (Scotland)
Television match official:
Carlo Damasco (Italy)

17 November 2012
17:00 CLST (UTC-3)

Chile	22–28	Portugal
Try: Huete 28' c Con: Valderrama (1/1) 29'; Pen: Pizzaro (1/4) 12'; Valderrama (4/5) 24', 37', 45', 56'	Report	Try: Foro 49' c Con: Leal (1/1) 50'; Pen: Leal (7/8) 4', 21', 33', 41', 60', 68', 77'

Estadio San Carlos de Apoquindo, Santiago, Chile
Attendance: 2,000
Referee: Joaquín Montes (Uruguay)

Team details

FB	15	Javier Valderrama
RW	14	Oliver Bassa
OC	13	Germán Herrera
IC	12	Jose Ignacio Larenas		(substituted off) 76'
LW	11	Francisco Neira
FH	10	Benjamin Pizzaro	(yellow card) 20' to 30'	(substituted off) 68'
SH	9	Atilio Menichetti		(substituted off) 63'
N8	8	Rodrigo Tobar (c)
OF	7	Francisco Cabrera
BF	6	Ignacio Silva		(substituted off) 54'
RL	5	Sergio Valdés
LL	4	Pablo Huete		(substituted off) 45'
TP	3	Sergio de la Fuente		(substituted off) 50'
HK	2	Manuel Gurruchaga		(substituted off) 50'
LP	1	Francisco Deformes
Replacements:
HK	16	Alejandro Rios		(substituted on) 50'
PR	17	Ramon Ayarza
PR	18	Jose Tomas Munita		(substituted on) 50'
LK	19	Rolando Pellerano		(substituted on) 45'
N8	20	Benjamin Soto		(substituted on) 54'
SH	21	Juan Pablo Perrota		(substituted on) 63'
FH	22	Juan Jose Ruiz		(substituted on) 68'
CE	23	Alvaro Tapia		(substituted on) 76'
Coach:
(Argentina) Omar Turcumán

FB	15	Nuno Penha e Costa		(substituted off) 63'
RW	14	Wilfried Rodrigues		(substituted off) 58'
OC	13	Carl Murray		(substituted off) 71'
IC	12	José Lima
LW	11	Gonçalo Foro
FH	10	Pedro Leal
SH	9	Samuel Marques		(substituted off) 60'
N8	8	Tiago Girão
OF	7	Jacques Le Roux	(yellow card) 44' to 54'	(substituted off) 54'
BF	6	Eric dos Santos
RL	5	Gonçalo Uva (c)
LL	4	David dos Reis
TP	3	Anthony Alves
HK	2	João Correia
LP	1	Francisco Fernandes	(red card) 55'
Replacements:
HK	16	Mike Tadjer
PR	17	Jorge Segurado		(substituted on) 58'
PR	18	Jose Leal da Costa
LK	19	Fernando Almeida
FL	20	Laurent Balangué		(substituted on) 54'
SH	21	Francisco Magalhães		(substituted on) 60'
CE	22	Alex de Barros		(substituted on) 71'
FB	23	António Aguilar		(substituted on) 63'
Coach:
(New Zealand) Errol Brain

Touch judges:
Henrique Platais (Brazil)
Juan Sylvestre (Argentina)

=== 21 November ===
21 November 2012
19:00 CET/GMT+01 (UTC+01)

Basque Country	19–3	Japan
Try: Gerber 30' c, 51' m, 65' c Con: Yachvili (1/2) 53'; Potgieter (1/1) 66'	Report (In French)	Pen: Tanabe (1/4) 5'

Estadio Mendizorroza, Vitoria
Attendance: 3,458
Referee: Andrew McMenemy

=== 23/24/25 November ===
23 November 2012
19:30 WET/GMT+0 (UTC+0)

Canada	19–32	Māori All Blacks
Try: Barkwill 70' c Con: Braid (1/1) 71'; Pen: Pritchard (4/5) 24', 28', 39', 47'	Report	Try: Taylor 25' c Ngatai 79' c Con: Ripia (2/2) 26', 80'; Pen: Ripia (6/7) 2', 11', 14', 32', 49', 57'

Oxford University Sports Centre, Oxford
Referee: Martin Fox (England)

Team details

FB	15	James Pritchard	(substituted off) 63'
RW	14	Jeff Hassler
OC	13	Ciaran Hearn	(substituted off) 78'
IC	12	Phil Mackenzie
LW	11	Taylor Paris
FH	10	Connor Braid
SH	9	Phil Mack
N8	8	Aaron Carpenter (c)
OF	7	Chauncey O'Toole	(substituted off) 58'
BF	6	Tyler Ardron
RL	5	Tyler Hotson	(substituted off) 58'
LL	4	Jebb Sinclair
TP	3	Andrew Tiedemann	(substituted off) 63'
HK	2	Ryan Hamilton	(substituted off) 43'
LP	1	Hubert Buydens
Replacements:
PR	16	Jason Marshall
HK	17	Ray Barkwill	(substituted on) 43'
PR	18	Doug Wooldridge	(substituted on) 63'
LK	19	Brett Beukeboom	(substituted on) 58'
FL	20	John Moonlight	(substituted on) 58'
FB	21	Eric Wilson
FH	22	Nathan Hirayama	(substituted on) 63'
WG	23	Sean Duke	(substituted on) 78'
Coach:
(New Zealand) Kieran Crowley

FB	15	Trent Renata
RW	14	Kurt Baker
OC	13	Charlie Ngatai
IC	12	Tim Bateman	(yellow card) 52' to 62'
LW	11	Andre Taylor		(substituted off) 70'
FH	10	Willie Ripia
SH	9	Frae Wilson		(substituted off) 58'
N8	8	Elliot Dixon		(substituted off) 58'
OF	7	Tanerau Latimer (c)
BF	6	Shane Christie
RL	5	Romana Graham	(yellow card) 6' to 16'
LL	4	Jason Eaton		(substituted off) 49'
TP	3	Ben May		(substituted off) 58'
HK	2	Quentin MacDonald		(substituted off) 49'
LP	1	Bronson Murray		(substituted off) 40'
Replacements:
HK	16	Hika Elliot		(substituted on) 49'
PR	17	Jacob Ellison		(substituted on) 58'
PR	18	Ben Afeaki		(substituted on) 40'
LK	19	Jarrad Hoeata		(substituted on) 49'
FL	20	Nick Crosswell		(substituted on) 58'
SH	21	Jamison Gibson-Park		(substituted on) 58'
CE	22	Jackson Willison		(substituted on) 70'
WG	23	Declan O'Donnell
Coach:
Jamie Joseph

Touch judges:
Ross Campbell (England)
Roger Baileff (England)

24 November 2012
15:00 GET (UTC+4)

Georgia	19–24	Fiji
Try: Khinchagishvili 28' c Con: Kvirikashvili (1/1) 29'; Pen: Kvirikashvili (4/7) 7', 14', 33', 40	Report	Try: Ratuva 11' c Goneva 18' m Con: Ralulu (1/2) 12'; Pen: Ralulu (4/6) 5', 35', 66', 76'

Mikheil Meskhi Stadium, Tbilisi
Referee: Pascal Gaüzère (France)

Team details

FB	15	Irakli Kiasashvili	(substituted off) 60'
RW	14	Irakli Machkhaneli
OC	13	Davit Kacharava
IC	12	Merab Sharikadze
LW	11	Sandro Todua
FH	10	Merab Kvirikashvili
SH	9	Irakli Abuseridze (c)
N8	8	Mamuka Gorgodze
OF	7	Vito Kolelishvili
BF	6	Shalva Sutiashvili	(substituted off) 68'
RL	5	Levan Datunashvili	(substituted off) 65'
LL	4	Kote Mikautadze
TP	3	Davit Kubriashvili	(substituted off) 51'
HK	2	Irakli Natriashvili	(substituted off) 60'
LP	1	Davit Khinchagishvili	(substituted off) 60'
Replacements:
HK	16	Shalva Mamukashvili	(substituted on) 60'
PR	17	Mikheil Nariashvili	(substituted on) 60'
PR	18	Davit Zirakashvili	(substituted on) 51'
LK	19	Vakhtang Maisuradze	(substituted on) 65'
SH	20	Giorgi Begadze
N8	21	Beka Bitsadze	(substituted on) 68'
FH	22	Lasha Khmaladze	(substituted on) 60'
CE	23	Tedo Zibzibadze
Coach:
(New Zealand) Milton Haig

FB	15	Metuisela Talebula
RW	14	Aisea Natoga		(substituted off) 65'
OC	13	Saula Radidi
IC	12	Vereniki Goneva
LW	11	Watisoni Votu
FH	10	Jonetani Ralulu
SH	9	Nikola Matawalu		(substituted off) 53'
N8	8	Iliesa Ratuva		(substituted off) 60'
OF	7	Malakai Ravulo		(substituted off) 62'
BF	6	Api Naikatini	(yellow card) 26' to 36'	(substituted off) 53'
RL	5	Apisalome Ratuniyarawa
LL	4	Leone Nakarawa
TP	3	Setefano Somoca (c)		(substituted off) 78'
HK	2	Viliame Veikoso		(substituted off) 71'
LP	1	Jerry Yanuyanutawa		(substituted off) 71'
Replacements:
HK	16	Tale Tuapati		(substituted on) 71'
PR	17	Manasa Saulo		(substituted on) 78'
PR	18	Seremaia Naureure		(substituted on) 71'
FL	19	Josefa Domolailai		(substituted on) 53'
N8	20	Nemani Nagusa		(substituted on) 60'
SH	21	Kelemedi Bola		(substituted on) 53'
WG	22	Samu Wara		(substituted on) 65'
FL	23	Samu Bola		(substituted on) 62'
Coach:
Inoke Male

24 November 2012
14:00 IST/GMT+0 (UTC+0)

Ireland	46–24	Argentina
Try: Gilroy 10' c Sexton 15' c, 50' c Strauss 21' m Zebo 32' m Bowe 46' m, 72' c Con: Sexton (3/6) 12' 17', 52'; O'Gara (1/1) 73'; Pen: Sexton (1/1) 45'	Report	Try: Leonardi 76' c Fernández Lobbe 80' m Con: Hernández (1/1) 77'; Pen: Sánchez (4/6) 13', 18', 30', 42'

Aviva Stadium, Dublin
Attendance: 43,406
Referee: Jaco Peyper (South Africa)

Team details

FB	15	Simon Zebo
RW	14	Tommy Bowe	(substituted off) 74'
OC	13	Keith Earls
IC	12	Gordon D'Arcy
LW	11	Craig Gilroy
FH	10	Johnny Sexton	(substituted off) 72'
SH	9	Conor Murray	(substituted off) 72'
N8	8	Jamie Heaslip (c)
OF	7	Chris Henry
BF	6	Peter O'Mahony	(substituted off) 72'
RL	5	Mike McCarthy	(substituted off) 62'
LL	4	Donnacha Ryan
TP	3	Mike Ross	(substituted off) 67'
HK	2	Richardt Strauss	(substituted off) 74'
LP	1	Cian Healy	(substituted off) 74'
Replacements:
HK	16	Seán Cronin	(substituted on) 74'
PR	17	Dave Kilcoyne	(substituted on) 74'
PR	18	Michael Bent	(substituted on) 67'
LK	19	Donncha O'Callaghan	(substituted on) 62'
FL	20	Iain Henderson	(substituted on) 72'
SH	21	Eoin Reddan	(substituted on) 72'
FH	22	Ronan O'Gara	(substituted on) 72'
WG	23	Fergus McFadden	(substituted on) 74'
Coach:
Declan Kidney

FB	15	Juan Martín Hernández
RW	14	Gonzalo Camacho
OC	13	Marcelo Bosch
IC	12	Santiago Fernández
LW	11	Juan Imhoff		(substituted off) 53'
FH	10	Nicolás Sánchez		21' to 24'		(substituted off) 60'
SH	9	Martín Landajo		(substituted off) 68'
N8	8	Leonardo Senatore		(substituted off) 64'	(substituted on) 73'
OF	7	Juan Manuel Leguizamón		(substituted off) 54'
BF	6	Juan Martín Fernández Lobbe (c)
RL	5	Julio Farías Cabello		(substituted off) 77'
LL	4	Manuel Carizza
TP	3	Maximiliano Bustos	(yellow card) 63' to 73'		(substituted off) 73'
HK	2	Eusebio Guiñazú		(substituted off) 56'
LP	1	Marcos Ayerza		(substituted off) 68'
Replacements:
HK	16	Agustín Creevy		(substituted on) 56'
PR	17	Nahuel Lobo		(substituted on) 68'
PR	18	Francisco Gómez Kodela		(substituted on) 64'
LK	19	Tomás Vallejos		(substituted on) 77'
FL	20	Tomás Leonardi		(substituted on) 54'
SH	21	Nicolás Vergallo		(substituted on) 68'
CE	22	Gonzalo Tiesi		(substituted on) 21'	(substituted off) 24'	(substituted on) 60'
WG	23	Manuel Montero		(substituted on) 53'
Coach:
Santiago Phelan

Touch judges:
Romain Poite (France)
Andrew Small (England)
Television match official:
Geoff Warren (England)

24 November 2012
15:00 CET/GMT+01 (UTC+1)

Italy	19–22	Australia
Try: Barbieri 40' c Con: Orquera (1/1) 41'; Pen: Orquera (4/5) 3', 33' 49', 54'	Report	Try: Cummins 18' c Con: Barnes (1/1) 19'; Pen: Barnes (3/3) 6', 15', 24'; Beale (2/2) 27', 29'

Stadio Artemio Franchi, Florence
Attendance: 32,500
Referee: Lourens van der Merwe (South Africa)

Team details

FB	15	Andrea Masi
RW	14	Giovanbattista Venditti
OC	13	Tommaso Benvenuti
IC	12	Alberto Sgarbi
LW	11	Mirco Bergamasco		(substituted off) 53'
FH	10	Luciano Orquera
SH	9	Edoardo Gori	(substituted off) 74'
N8	8	Sergio Parisse (c)
OF	7	Robert Barbieri	(yellow card) 29' to 39'	(substituted off) 59'
BF	6	Alessandro Zanni		(substituted off) 68'
RL	5	Francesco Minto
LL	4	Quintin Geldenhuys		(substituted off) 59'
TP	3	Martin Castrogiovanni		(substituted off) 62'
HK	2	Leonardo Ghiraldini		(substituted off) 59'
LP	1	Andrea Lo Cicero		(substituted off) 33'
Replacements:
HK	16	Davide Giazzon		(substituted on) 59'
PR	17	Michele Rizzo		(substituted on) 33'
PR	18	Lorenzo Cittadini		(substituted on) 62'
LK	19	Antonio Pavanello		(substituted on) 59'
FL	20	Simone Favaro		(substituted on) 59'
N8	21	Manoa Vosawai		(substituted on) 68'
SH	22	Tobias Botes		(substituted on) 74'
FB	23	Luke McLean		(substituted on) 53'
Coach:
(France) Jacques Brunel

FB	15	Berrick Barnes
RW	14	Nick Cummins		(substituted off) 72'
OC	13	Adam Ashley-Cooper
IC	12	Ben Tapuai
LW	11	Drew Mitchell
FH	10	Kurtley Beale
SH	9	Brett Sheehan		(substituted off) 31'
N8	8	Wycliff Palu
OF	7	Michael Hooper
BF	6	Scott Higginbotham		(substituted off) 66'
RL	5	Nathan Sharpe (c)
LL	4	Sitaleki Timani
TP	3	Ben Alexander		(substituted off) 72'
HK	2	Stephen Moore
LP	1	Benn Robinson		(substituted off) 37'
Replacements:
HK	16	James Hanson
PR	17	James Slipper		(substituted on) 37'
PR	18	Sekope Kepu		(substituted on) 72'
FL	19	Dave Dennis		(substituted on) 66'
FL	20	Liam Gill
SH	21	Nick Phipps		(substituted on) 31'
FB	22	Mike Harris
WG	23	Digby Ioane	(yellow card) 78' to 80'	(substituted on) 72'
Coach:
(New Zealand) Robbie Deans

Touch judges:
Wayne Barnes (England)
Neil Paterson (Scotland)
Television match official:
Marshall Kilgore (Ireland)

24 November 2012
16:00 EET/GMT+02 (UTC+02)

Romania	3–34	United States
Pen: Filip (1/3) 4'	Report	Try: Suniula 9' c Emerick 24' m Wyles 40' c, 45' m Ngwenya 64' c Con: Wyles (3/5) 10', 40', 65'; Pen: Wyles (1/3) 37'

Stadionul Naţional de Rugby, Bucharest
Referee: Leighton Hodges (Wales)

Team details

FB	15	Cătălin Fercu
RW	14	Mădălin Lemnaru
OC	13	Ionel Cazan		(substituted off) 40'
IC	12	Csaba Gál
LW	11	Ionut Botezatu
FH	10	Andrei Filip		(substituted off) 75'
SH	9	Florin Surugiu
N8	8	Ovidiu Tonița		(substituted off) 65'
OF	7	Mihai Macovei (c)
BF	6	Vasile Rus (red card) 51'
RL	5	Alin Coste		(substituted off) 71'
LL	4	Cosmin Rațiu	(yellow card) 48' to 58'	(substituted off) 58'
TP	3	Mihaï Lazăr		(substituted off) 61'
HK	2	Otar Turashvili
LP	1	Petru Tamba		(substituted off) 61'
Replacements:
HK	16	Andrei Rădoi		(substituted on) 61'
PR	17	Horaţiu Pungea		(substituted on) 61'
PR	18	Vlad Bădălicescu		(substituted on) 71'
LK	19	Alex Manta		(substituted on) 58'
N8	20	Viorel Lucaci		(substituted on) 65'
SH	21	Grigoras Diaconescu
FH	22	Ionuț Florea		(substituted on) 75'
WG	23	Constantin Gheară		(substituted on) 40'
Coach:
Haralambie Dumitras

FB	15	Chris Wyles
RW	14	Takudzwa Ngwenya
OC	13	Paul Emerick		(substituted off) 73'
IC	12	Andrew Suniula		(substituted off) 60'
LW	11	Luke Hume
FH	10	Toby L'Estrange
SH	9	Mike Petri		(substituted off) 60'
N8	8	Todd Clever (c)
OF	7	Peter Dahl		(substituted off) 70'
BF	6	John Quill	(red card) 51'
RL	5	Louis Stanfill		(substituted off) 75'
LL	4	Scott LaValla
TP	3	Eric Fry
HK	2	Chris Biller		(substituted off) 60'
LP	1	Shawn Pittman
Replacements:
HK	16	Derek Asbun		(substituted on) 60'
PR	17	Nick Wallace
PR	18	Zachary Fenoglio
LK	19	Graham Harriman		(substituted on) 75'
FL	20	Inaki Basauri		(substituted on) 70'
SH	21	Robbie Shaw		(substituted on) 60'
CN	22	Roland Suniula		(substituted on) 60'
WG	23	Zach Pangelinan		(substituted on) 73'
Coach:
Mike Tolkin

Touch judges:
Andrew McMenemy (Scotland)
Ian Davies (Wales)

24 November 2012
14:30 WET/GMT+0 (UTC+0)

England	15–16	South Africa
Pen: Flood (2/3) 5', 12'; Farrell (3/4) 61', 72', 78'	Report	Try: Alberts 43' c Con: Lambie 43' (1/1); Pen: Lambie (3/3) 8', 15', 25'

Twickenham Stadium, London
Attendance: 81,151
Referee: Nigel Owens (Wales)

Team details

FB	15	Alex Goode
RW	14	Chris Ashton
OC	13	Manu Tuilagi
IC	12	Brad Barritt
LW	11	Mike Brown
FH	10	Toby Flood	6' to 10'		(substituted off) 45'
SH	9	Ben Youngs	(substituted off) 67'
N8	8	Ben Morgan
OF	7	Chris Robshaw (c)
BF	6	Tom Wood	(substituted off) 53'
RL	5	Geoff Parling
LL	4	Joe Launchbury	(substituted off) 72'
TP	3	Dan Cole	(substituted off) 75'
HK	2	Tom Youngs	(substituted off) 67'
LP	1	Alex Corbisiero	(substituted off) 53'
Replacements:
HK	16	David Paice	(substituted on) 67'
PR	17	David Wilson	(substituted on) 75'
PR	18	Mako Vunipola	(substituted on) 53'
LK	19	Mouritz Botha	(substituted on) 72'
FL	20	James Haskell	(substituted on) 53'
SH	21	Danny Care	(substituted on) 67'
IC	22	Owen Farrell	(substituted on) 6'	(substituted off) 10'	(substituted on) 45'
CN	23	Jonathan Joseph
Coach:
Stuart Lancaster

FB	15	Zane Kirchner
RW	14	JP Pietersen
OC	13	Juan de Jongh
IC	12	Jean de Villiers (c)
LW	11	Francois Hougaard
FH	10	Pat Lambie
SH	9	Ruan Pienaar
N8	8	Duane Vermeulen
OF	7	Willem Alberts	(substituted off) 56'
BF	6	Francois Louw
RL	5	Juandré Kruger
LL	4	Eben Etzebeth	(substituted off) 69'
TP	3	Jannie du Plessis	(substituted off) 40'
HK	2	Adriaan Strauss	(substituted off) 74'
LP	1	Gurthrö Steenkamp	(substituted off) 62'
Replacements:
HK	16	Schalk Brits	(substituted on) 74'
PR	17	Heinke van der Merwe	(substituted on) 62'
PR	18	Pat Cilliers	(substituted on) 40'
LK	19	Flip van der Merwe	(substituted on) 69'
FL	20	Marcell Coetzee	(substituted on) 56'
FH	21	Elton Jantjies
CN	22	Jaco Taute
WG	23	Lwazi Mvovo
Coach:
Heyneke Meyer

Touch judges:
Glen Jackson (New Zealand)
Peter Fitzgibbon (Ireland)
Television match official:
Jim Yuille (Scotland)

24 November 2012
15:00 WET/GMT+0 (UTC+0)

Scotland	15–21	Tonga
Pen: Laidlaw (5/5) 10', 38', 46', 55', 61'	Report	Try: Lokotui 51' c Vainikolo 65' m Con: Apikotoa (1/2) 52'; Pen: Apikotoa (3/5) 5', 64', 72'

Pittodrie Stadium, Aberdeen
Attendance: 20,306
Referee: Mathieu Raynal (France)

Team details

FB	15	Stuart Hogg
RW	14	Sean Lamont
OC	13	Max Evans	(substituted off) 59'
IC	12	Matt Scott
LW	11	Tim Visser
FH	10	Greig Laidlaw	(substituted off) 67'
SH	9	Henry Pyrgos	(substituted off) 52'
N8	8	David Denton	(substituted off) 52'
OF	7	Kelly Brown (c)
BF	6	Alasdair Strokosch
RL	5	Alastair Kellock
LL	4	Richie Gray
TP	3	Euan Murray	51' to 53'
HK	2	Scott Lawson	(substituted off) 51'
LP	1	Kyle Traynor
Replacements:
HK	16	Dougie Hall	(substituted on) 51'
PR	17	Gordon Reid
PR	18	Geoff Cross	(substituted on) 51'	(substituted off) 53'
FL	19	Grant Gilchrist
FL	20	John Barclay	(substituted on) 52'
SH	21	Rory Lawson	(substituted on) 52'
FH	22	Tom Heathcote	(substituted on) 67'
CE	23	Nick De Luca	(substituted on) 59'
Coach:
(England) Andy Robinson

FB	15	Vunga Lilo
RW	14	Fetuʻu Vainikolo
OC	13	Suka Hufanga		(substituted off) 67'
IC	12	Sione Piukala
LW	11	William Helu		(substituted off) 75'
FH	10	Fangatapu Apikotoa
SH	9	Taniela Moa
N8	8	Viliami Maʻafu
OF	7	Nili Latu (c)	(yellow card) 68' to 78'
BF	6	Hale T-Pole		(substituted off) 51'
RL	5	Lua Lokotui	(yellow card) 33' to 43'
LL	4	Joe Tuineau		(substituted off) 75'
TP	3	Halani Aulika		(substituted off) 45'
HK	2	Elvis Taione		(substituted off) 70'
LP	1	Sona Taumalolo
Replacements:
HK	16	Ilaisa Maʻasi		(substituted on) 70'
PR	17	Tevita Mailau		(substituted on) 45'
PR	18	Kamaliele Sakalia
FL	19	Steve Mafi	(yellow card) 78' to 80'	(substituted on) 51'
LK	20	Sione Timani		(substituted on) 75'
WG	21	Viliame Iongi		(substituted on) 75'
CE	22	Eddie Paea
CE	23	Alipate Fatafehi		(substituted on) 67'
Coach:
Mana Otai

Touch judges:
George Clancy (Ireland)
Marius Mitrea (Italy)
Television match official:
Carlo Damasco (Italy)

Notes:

- This result was Tonga's first ever win over Scotland.
- This defeat was Scotland's first at Aberdeen's Pittodrie Stadium.

24 November 2012
18:00 CET/GMT+01 (UTC+1)

France	22–14	Samoa
Try: Michalak 18' c Con: Michalak (1/1) 19'; Pen: Parra (1/3) 35'; Michalak (4/4) 56', 60', 71', 78'	Report	Try: Lemi 14' c Tekori 41' c Con: T. Pisi (2/2) 15', 42'

Stade de France, Saint-Denis
Attendance: 36,000
Referee: John Lacey (Ireland)

Team details

FB	15	Brice Dulin
RW	14	Wesley Fofana
OC	13	Florian Fritz	(substituted off) 66'
IC	12	Maxime Mermoz
LW	11	Vincent Clerc
FH	10	Frédéric Michalak
SH	9	Morgan Parra	(substituted off) 59'
N8	8	Louis Picamoles	(substituted off) 63'
OF	7	Fulgence Ouedraogo
BF	6	Yannick Nyanga
RL	5	Yoann Maestri	(substituted off) 69'
LL	4	Pascal Papé (c)
TP	3	Nicolas Mas	(substituted off) 57'
HK	2	Benjamin Kayser	(substituted off) 44'
LP	1	Thomas Domingo	(substituted off) 45'
Replacements:
HK	16	Dimitri Szarzewski	(substituted on) 44'
PR	17	Yannick Forestier	(substituted on) 45'
PR	18	Vincent Debaty	(substituted on) 57'
LK	19	Jocelino Suta	(substituted on) 69'
N8	20	Damien Chouly	(substituted on) 63'
SH	21	Maxime Machenaud	(substituted on) 59'
FH	22	François Trinh-Duc
WG	23	Yoann Huget	(substituted on) 66'
Coach:
Philippe Saint-André

FB	15	David Lemi (c)
RW	14	Paul Perez
OC	13	George Pisi
IC	12	Johnny Leota	2' to 7'		(substituted off) 72'
LW	11	Robert Lilomaiava
FH	10	Tusi Pisi	(substituted off) 75'
SH	9	Kahn Fotuali'i
N8	8	Tai Tu'ifua
OF	7	Maurie Fa'asavalu
BF	6	Ofisa Treviranus	(substituted off) 66'
RL	5	Joe Tekori
LL	4	Filo Paulo	(substituted off) 54'
TP	3	Census Johnston	(substituted off) 50'
HK	2	Ti'i Paulo	(substituted off) 40'
LP	1	Sakaria Taulafo
Replacements:
HK	16	Ole Avei	(substituted on) 40'
PR	17	Viliamu Afatia
PR	18	James Johnston	(substituted on) 50'
LK	19	Fa'atiga Lemalu	(substituted on) 54'
FL	20	Tivani Fomai	(substituted on) 66'
SH	21	Jeremy Su'a	(substituted on) 75'
FH	22	Ki Anufe	(substituted on) 2'	(substituted off) 7'	(substituted on) 72'
WG	23	Rupeni Levasa
Coach:
Stephen Betham

Touch judges:
Alain Rolland (Ireland)
Dudley Phillips (Ireland)
Television match official:
Iain Ramage (Scotland)

24 November 2012
17:15 WET/GMT+0 (UTC+0)

Wales	10–33	New Zealand
Try: S. Williams 56' m Cuthbert 76' m	Report	Try: Messam 25' c Woodcock 38' c Romano 48'; Con: Cruden (3/3) 27', 40', 49'; Pen: Cruden (4/4) 9', 18', 22', 42'

Millennium Stadium, Cardiff
Attendance: 72,732
Referee: Craig Joubert (South Africa)

Team details

FB	15	Leigh Halfpenny
RW	14	Alex Cuthbert
OC	13	Jonathan Davies
IC	12	Jamie Roberts	(substituted off) 18'
LW	11	Liam Williams
FH	10	Rhys Priestland	(substituted off) 67'
SH	9	Mike Phillips	(substituted off) 54'
N8	8	Taulupe Faletau
OF	7	Sam Warburton (c)
BF	6	Ryan Jones	(substituted off) 49'
RL	5	Luke Charteris
LL	4	Bradley Davies	(substituted off) 1'
TP	3	Aaron Jarvis	(substituted off) 1'
HK	2	Matthew Rees	(substituted off) 64'
LP	1	Paul James	(substituted off) 54'
Replacements:
HK	16	Ken Owens	(substituted on) 64'
PR	17	Gethin Jenkins	(substituted on) 54'
PR	18	Scott Andrews	(substituted on) 1'
FL	19	Aaron Shingler	(substituted on) 1'
FL	20	Justin Tipuric	(substituted on) 49'
SH	21	Tavis Knoyle	(substituted on) 54'
FH	22	James Hook	(substituted on) 67'
CE	23	Scott Williams	(substituted on) 18'
Coach:
(New Zealand) Warren Gatland

FB	15	Israel Dagg
RW	14	Cory Jane	(yellow card) 59' to 69'
OC	13	Conrad Smith
IC	12	Ma'a Nonu
LW	11	Julian Savea		(substituted off) 76'
FH	10	Aaron Cruden		(substituted off) 68'
SH	9	Aaron Smith		(substituted off) 50'
N8	8	Kieran Read
OF	7	Richie McCaw (c)
BF	6	Liam Messam		(substituted off) 70'
RL	5	Sam Whitelock
LL	4	Luke Romano		(substituted off) 50'
TP	3	Owen Franks		(substituted off) 60'
HK	2	Andrew Hore		(substituted off) 54'
LP	1	Tony Woodcock		(substituted off) 50'
Replacements:
HK	16	Dane Coles		(substituted on) 54'
PR	17	Wyatt Crockett		(substituted on) 50'
PR	18	Charlie Faumuina		(substituted on) 60'
LK	19	Brodie Retallick		(substituted on) 50'
N8	20	Victor Vito		(substituted on) 70'
SH	21	Piri Weepu		(substituted on) 50'
FH	22	Beauden Barrett		(substituted on) 68'
FB	23	Ben Smith		(substituted on) 76'
Coach:
Steve Hansen

Touch judges:
Jérôme Garcès (France)
Greg Garner (England)
Television match official:
Graham Hughes (England)

25 November 2012
15:00 CET/GMT+01 (UTC+1)

French Barbarians (France)	65–41	Japan
	Report

Stade Océane, Le Havre
Referee: Francisco Pastrana (Argentina)

=== 1 December ===
1 December 2012
14:30 WET/GMT+0 (UTC+0)

England	38–21	New Zealand
Try: Barritt 54' m Ashton 58' m Tuilagi 62' c Con: Farrell (1/3) 63'; Pen: Farrell (4/4) 25', 32', 40', 42'; Burns (2/2) 66', 72'; Drop: Farrell 38'	Report	Try: Savea 48' c, 75' c Read 51' c Con: Carter (2/2) 49', 53'; Cruden (1/1) 76'

Twickenham Stadium, London
Attendance: 81,416
Referee: George Clancy (Ireland)

Team details

FB	15	Alex Goode
RW	14	Chris Ashton
OC	13	Manu Tuilagi		(substituted off) 66'
IC	12	Brad Barritt
LW	11	Mike Brown
FH	10	Owen Farrell		(substituted off) 64'
SH	9	Ben Youngs		(substituted off) 68'
N8	8	Ben Morgan		(substituted off) 57'
OF	7	Chris Robshaw (c)
BF	6	Tom Wood			(substituted off) 78'
RL	5	Geoff Parling
LL	4	Joe Launchbury		(substituted off) 66'
TP	3	Dan Cole		72' to 78'
HK	2	Tom Youngs		(substituted off) 72'
LP	1	Alex Corbisiero		(substituted off) 66'
Replacements:
HK	16	David Paice		(substituted on) 72'
PR	17	David Wilson		(substituted on) 72'
PR	18	Mako Vunipola	(yellow card) 74' to 80'	(substituted on) 66'
LK	19	Courtney Lawes		(substituted on) 66'
FL	20	James Haskell		(substituted on) 57'
SH	21	Danny Care		(substituted on) 68'
FH	22	Freddie Burns		(substituted on) 64'
CR	23	Jonathan Joseph		(substituted on) 66'
Coach:
Stuart Lancaster

FB	15	Israel Dagg	(substituted off) 71'
RW	14	Cory Jane
OC	13	Conrad Smith
IC	12	Ma'a Nonu
LW	11	Julian Savea
FH	10	Dan Carter	(substituted off) 64'
SH	9	Aaron Smith	(substituted off) 64'
N8	8	Kieran Read
OF	7	Richie McCaw (c)
BF	6	Liam Messam	(substituted off) 63'
RL	5	Sam Whitelock
LL	4	Brodie Retallick	(substituted off) 48'
TP	3	Owen Franks	(substituted off) 52'
HK	2	Keven Mealamu	(substituted off) 62'
LP	1	Tony Woodcock	(substituted off) 66'
Replacements:
HK	16	Dane Coles	(substituted on) 62'
PR	17	Wyatt Crockett	(substituted on) 66'
PR	18	Charlie Faumuina	(substituted on) 52'
LK	19	Luke Romano	(substituted on) 48'
N8	20	Victor Vito	(substituted on) 63'
SH	21	Piri Weepu	(substituted on) 64'
FH	22	Aaron Cruden	(substituted on) 64'
FB	23	Ben Smith	(substituted on) 71'
Coach:
Steve Hansen

Touch judges:
Nigel Owens (Wales)
Lourens van der Merwe (South Africa)
Television match official:
Giulio De Santis (Italy)

Notes:

- Freddie Burns (England) made his international debut.
- England claimed the Hillary Shield for the first time.
- This was England's biggest win over New Zealand, the most points they have ever scored against them, and their first win against them in 10 years.
- This was also New Zealand's joint second-largest defeat; at the time only Australia had beaten them by more.
- This was New Zealand's first defeat since they became world champions, and their first in 22 matches.

1 December 2012
14:30 WET/GMT+0 (UTC+0)

Wales	12–14	Australia
Pen: Halfpenny (4/5) 18', 23', 55', 60'	Report	Try: Beale 80' m Pen: Beale (3/5) 15', 27', 36'

Millennium Stadium, Cardiff
Referee: Wayne Barnes (England)

Team details

FB	15	Leigh Halfpenny	(substituted off) 80+2'
RW	14	Alex Cuthbert
OC	13	Jonathan Davies
IC	12	Jamie Roberts
LW	11	Liam Williams
FH	10	Rhys Priestland
SH	9	Mike Phillips
N8	8	Taulupe Faletau	(substituted off) 65'
OF	7	Sam Warburton (c)
BF	6	Aaron Shingler
RL	5	Luke Charteris	3' to 7'		(substituted off) 40'
LL	4	Lou Reed
TP	3	Scott Andrews
HK	2	Matthew Rees	(substituted off) 65'
LP	1	Gethin Jenkins
Replacements:
HK	16	Ken Owens	(substituted on) 65'
PR	17	Ryan Bevington
PR	18	Samson Lee
N8	19	Ryan Jones	(substituted on) 3'	(substituted off) 7'	(substituted on) 40'
FL	20	Justin Tipuric	(substituted on) 65'
SH	21	Tavis Knoyle
FH	22	Dan Biggar
CE	23	Scott Williams
Coach:
(New Zealand) Warren Gatland

FB	15	Berrick Barnes
RW	14	Nick Cummins	(substituted off) 48'
OC	13	Adam Ashley-Cooper
IC	12	Ben Tapuai	(substituted off) 58'
LW	11	Drew Mitchell
FH	10	Kurtley Beale
SH	9	Nick Phipps
N8	8	Wycliff Palu
OF	7	David Pocock
BF	6	Scott Higginbotham	(substituted off) 15'
RL	5	Nathan Sharpe (c)
LL	4	Kane Douglas	(substituted off) 52'
TP	3	Ben Alexander	(substituted off) 68'
HK	2	Tatafu Polota-Nau	(substituted off) 40'
LP	1	Benn Robinson	(substituted off) 61'
Replacements:
HK	16	Stephen Moore	(substituted on) 40'
PR	17	James Slipper	(substituted on) 61'
LK	18	Sekope Kepu	(substituted on) 68'
FL	19	Dave Dennis	(substituted on) 15'
FL	20	Michael Hooper	(substituted on) 52'
SH	21	Brendan McKibbin
FB	22	Mike Harris	(substituted on) 58'
WG	23	Digby Ioane	(substituted on) 58'
Coach:
(New Zealand) Robbie Deans

Touch judges:
Romain Poite (France)
Greg Garner (England)
Television match official:
Marshall Kilgore (Ireland)

Notes:

- Australia captain Nathan Sharpe kicked for the conversion to end his career in the Australian squad.
- No replacement was made when Halfpenny was taken off due to injury.

== 2012 International Rugby Series ==
For more details on this topic, see: 2012 International Rugby Series

9 November 2012
18:00 WET/GMT+0 (UTC+0)

United States	40–26	Russia
Try: Fry 6' c L'Estrange 17' c Doyle 36' c Wyles 46' c Shaw 50' m, 58' c Con: Wyles (5/6) 7', 18', 37', 47', 59'	Report	Try: Ostroushko 53' m Temnov (2) 61' m, 71' c Con: Klyuchnikov (1/3) 72'; Pen: Klyuchnikov (3/4) 2', 12', 25'

Eirias Stadium, Colwyn Bay, Wales
Referee: Leighton Hodges (Wales)

9 November 2012
20:00 WET/GMT+0 (UTC+0)

Canada	12–42	Samoa
Try: Moonlight 70' m Braid 74' c Con: Pritchard (1/2) 75'	Report	Try: Tuifu'a 4' c Lilomaiava (4) 16' m, 21' c, 41' c, 66' c Con: So'oialo (4/5) 6', 22', 42', 67'; Pen: So'oialo (3/3) 14', 50', 54'

Eirias Stadium, Colwyn Bay, Wales
Attendance: 2,859
Referee: Francisco Pastrana (Argentina)

17 November 2012
18:00 WET/GMT+0 (UTC+0)

United States	13–22	Tonga
Try: Shaw 38' c Con: Pangelinan (1/1) 39'; Pen: Pangelinan (2/4) 28', 45'	Report	Try: Helu 2' m Lilo 59' c Piukala 75' c Con: Lilo (2/3) 3', 60', 76'; Pen: Lilo (1/3) 51'

Eirias Stadium, Colwyn Bay, Wales
Referee: Lourens van der Merwe (South Africa)

17 November 2012
20:00 WET/GMT+0 (UTC+0)

Canada	35–3	Russia
Try: Hassler 19' c, 57' c Paris 42' c Blevins 44' m Con: Pritchard (3/4) 20', 43', 45'; Pen: Pritchard (3/4) 4', 10', 33'	Report	Pen: Igor Klyuchnikov (1/3) 8'

Eirias Stadium, Colwyn Bay, Wales
Referee: Francisco Pastrana (Argentina)

== Effect on 2015 Rugby World Cup seeding ==
Much like the 2008 end of year series, the final IRB rankings at the end of the international window will play a massive part towards the seeding of the 2015 Rugby World Cup. Like the 2011 tournament, the IRB rankings will play a pivotal role in proceedings with the top four placed sides at the end of the international window set to be kept apart in the draw. All 12 of the automatic qualifiers will be seeded based on their ranking and then split three bands of four teams.

- Band 1 will be made up of the top 4 automatic qualifiers
- Band 2 will be made up of the next 4 automatic qualifiers (5–8)
- Band 3 will be made up of the next 4 automatic qualifiers (9–12)
- Band 4 will be made up of the remaining due to qualify places (Oceania 1, Europe 1, Asia 1 and Americas 1)
- Band 5 will include the remaining possible nations (Africa 1, Europe 2, Americas 2 and repechage Winner)

Following the final matches on 1 December 2012, the 12 teams automatically qualified were seeded thus:

Pot 1

1. New Zealand
2. South Africa
3. Australia
4. France

Pot 2

5. England
6. Ireland
7. Samoa
8. Argentina

Pot 3

9. Wales
10. Italy
11. Tonga
12. Scotland

Pot 4

- Americas 1
- Asia 1
- Europe 1
- Oceania 1

Pot 5

- Africa 1
- Americas 2
- Europe 2
- Repechage Winner

== See also ==
- End of year rugby union tests
- 2012 mid-year rugby union tests
- 2012 Emirates Cup of Nations
- 2012 International Rugby Series
- 2012 Māori All Blacks tour of United Kingdom
- 2012 Namibian Tri-Nations
- 2015 Rugby World Cup
