= List of Belgium national rugby union team results =

This is a list of results of the Belgium national rugby union team

== List of matches ==
=== 1997 ===
Date	City	Opponent	Results¹	Attendance	Type of game
28 March	Brussels	Morocco	9-13	???	International
11 May	Brussels	Tunisia	22-29	???	International
4 October	Belgium	Romania	13-83	???	Rugby World Cup Qualifying
18 October	Kyiv	Ukraine	5-48	???	Rugby World Cup Qualifying

¹ Results from Belgian view

=== 1998 ===
Date	City	Opponent	Results¹	Attendance	Type of game
28 March	Gdynia	Poland	10-30	???	Rugby World Cup Qualifying
18 April	Brussels	Netherlands	16-19	???	Rugby World Cup Qualifying
10 October	Belgium	(Socialist Federal Republic of Yugoslavia) Yugoslavia	12-6	???	International
24 October	Tunis	Tunisia	9-23	???	International

¹ Results from Belgian view

=== 1999 ===
Date	City	Opponent	Results¹	Attendance	Type of game
6 March	Belgium	Luxembourg	38-8	???	International
25 April	Germany	Germany	17-27	???	International
16 October	Belgium	Poland	14-43	???	International

¹ Results from Belgian view

=== 2000 ===
Date	City	Opponent	Results¹	Attendance	Type of game
4 March	Brussels	Switzerland	18-11	???	European Nations Cup
18 March	Brussels	Tunisia	12-9	???	European Nations Cup
15 April	Prague	Czech Republic	23-28	???	European Nations Cup
15 April	Latvia	Latvia	10-40	???	International
28 October	Brussels	Slovenia	24-10	???	Rugby World Cup Qualifying
25 November	Malta	Malta	0-26	???	Rugby World Cup Qualifying

¹ Results from Belgian view

=== 2001 ===
Date	City	Opponent	Results¹	Attendance	Type of game
10 January	Waterloo	Netherlands	8-0	???	International
3 March	Saint-Laurent-du-Var, France	Monaco	18-12	???	Rugby World Cup Qualifying
7 April	Brussels	Moldova	26-10	???	Rugby World Cup Qualifying
5 May	Laakdal, Belgium	Lithuania	29-20	???	Rugby World Cup Qualifying
22 September	Prague	Czech Republic	3-46	???	Rugby World Cup Qualifying
13 October	Kyiv	Ukraine	10-21	???	Rugby World Cup Qualifying
27 October	Brussels	Switzerland	15-22	???	Rugby World Cup Qualifying
24 November	Brussels	Croatia	0-26	???	Rugby World Cup Qualifying

¹ Results from Belgian view

=== 2002 ===
Date	City	Opponent	Results¹	Attendance	Type of game
2 November	Zagreb	Croatia	12-33	???	European Nations Cup

=== 2003 ===
Date	City	Opponent	Results¹	Attendance	Type of game
8 March	Switzerland	Switzerland	6-9	???	European Nations Cup
5 April	Belgium	Slovenia	24-33	???	European Nations Cup
10 November	Boitsfort, Brussels	Denmark	6-6	???	European Nations Cup
8 November	Slovenia	Slovenia	15-3	???	European Nations Cup

¹ Results from Belgian view

=== 2004 ===
Date	City	Opponent	Results¹	Attendance	Type of game
17 March	Visé	Netherlands	10-18	???	International
27 March	Brussels	Switzerland	3-32	???	European Nations Cup
10 April	Denmark	Denmark	19-25	???	International
24 April	Charleroi	Croatia	14-3	???	European Nations Cup
20 October	Visé	Armenia	11-24	???	International
30 October	Boitsfort, Brussels	Latvia	23-16	???	Rugby World Cup Qualifying

¹ Results from Belgian view

=== 2005 ===
Date	City	Opponent	Results¹	Attendance	Type of game
9 April	Jurbarkas	Lithuania	21-13	???	Rugby World Cup Qualifying
16 April	Visé, Belgium	Netherlands	15-10	???	Rugby World Cup Qualifying
30 April	Stockholm	Sweden	36-7	???	Rugby World Cup Qualifying
24 November	Brussels	Croatia	26-20	???	Rugby World Cup Qualifying

¹ Results from Belgian view

=== 2006 ===
Date	City	Opponent	Results¹	Attendance	Type of game
8 April	Belgrade	Serbia	36-15	???	Rugby World Cup Qualifying
22 April	Malta	Malta	24-0	???	Rugby World Cup Qualifying
29 April	Hannover	Germany	15-33	???	Rugby World Cup Qualifying
26 August	Liège	Spain	18-6	???	International
4 November	Brussels	Ukraine	24-11	???	European Nations Cup
18 November	Heidelberg, Germany	Germany	13-32	???	European Nations Cup

¹ Results from Belgian view

=== 2007 ===
Date	City	Opponent	Results¹	Attendance	Type of game
21 April	Brussels	Moldova	27-29	???	European Nations Cup
5 May	Amsterdam, Netherlands	Netherlands	27-20	???	European Nations Cup
10 November	Brussels	Germany	32-18	???	European Nations Cup
24 November	Ukraine	Ukraine	18-15	???	European Nations Cup

¹ Results from Belgian view

=== 2008 ===
Date	City	Opponent	Results¹	Attendance	Type of game
12 April	Chișinău	Moldova	19-22	???	European Nations Cup
3 May	Brussels	Netherlands	51-3	???	European Nations Cup
1 November	Brussels	Ukraine	9-8	???	RWC Qualifying/European Nations Cup
16 November	Chișinău	Moldova	8-20	???	RWC Qualifying/European Nations Cup

¹ Results from Belgian view

=== 2009 ===
Date	City	Opponent	Results¹	Attendance	Type of game
14 March	Brussels	Czech Republic	15-15	???	RWC Qualifying/European Nations Cup
30 May	Warsaw	Poland	3-14	???	RWC Qualifying/European Nations Cup
10 October	Kyiv	Ukraine	11-13	???	RWC Qualifying/European Nations Cup
Moldova	Brussels	Moldova	14-3	???	RWC Qualifying/European Nations Cup

¹ Results from Belgian view

=== 2010 ===
Date	City	Opponent	Results¹	Attendance	Type of game
3 April	Prague	Czech Republic	19-16	???	RWC Qualifying/European Nations Cup
24 April	Brussels	Poland	29-8	???	RWC Qualifying/European Nations Cup
6 November	Brussels	Canada	12-43	???	International
13 November	Prague	Czech Republic	24-12	???	European Nations Cup

¹ Results from Belgian view

=== 2011 ===
Date	City	Opponent	Results¹	Attendance	Type of game
12 February	Brussels	Moldova	20-5	???	European Nations Cup
12 March	Gdynia, Poland	Poland	21-28	???	European Nations Cup
19 March	Brussels	Germany	28-25	???	European Nations Cup
23 April	Amsterdam	Netherlands	30-18	???	European Nations Cup
5 November	Brussels	Czech Republic	55-0	???	European Nations Cup

¹ Results from Belgian view

=== 2012 ===
Date	City	Opponent	Results¹	Attendance	Type of game
25 February	Brussels	Netherlands	58-3	???	European Nations Cup
10 March	Chișinău	Moldova	17-16	???	European Nations Cup
17 March	Heusenstamm	Germany	30-29	???	European Nations Cup
7 April	Brussels	Poland	20-13	???	European Nations Cup
3 November 2012	Frameries	Armée française	26-11	???	Friendly
8 December 2012	Dubai	United Arab Emirates	94-3	???	2012 Cup of Nations (rugby union)
11 December 2012	Dubai	Zimbabwe	28-11	???	2012 Cup of Nations (rugby union)
14 December 2012	Dubai	Hong Kong	24-12	???	2012 Cup of Nations (rugby union)

¹ Results from Belgian view

== Belgium versus other countries ==
Against	Played	Won	Lost	Drawn	% Won
Moldova	6	3	3	0	50%
Switzerland	4	1	3	0	25%
Slovenia	3	2	1	0	66.66%
Denmark	2	1	0	1	0%
Netherlands	8	6	2	0	75%
Croatia	4	2	2	0	50%
Armenia	1	0	1	0	0%
Latvia	2	1	1	0	50%
Lithuania	2	2	0	0	100%
Sweden	1	1	0	0	100%
Serbia	1	1	0	0	100%
Malta	2	2	0	0	100%
Germany	6	3	3	0	50%
Spain	1	1	0	0	100%
Ukraine	6	3	3	0	50%
Poland	6	2	4	0	33.33%
Czech Republic	6	4	1	1	66.66%
Canada	1	0	1	0	0%
Monaco	1	1	0	0	100%
Tunisia	3	1	2	0	33.3%
Luxembourg	1	1	0	0	100%
Yugoslavia	1	0	0	0	100%
Morocco	1	0	1	0	0%
Romania	1	0	1	0	0%
Total	68	38	28	1	55.88%
