= Graulich =

Graulich is a surname. Notable people with the surname include:

- Billy Graulich (1868–1948), American baseball player
- Günter Graulich (born 1926), German church musician and music publisher
- Lew Graulich (1862–1934), American baseball player
- Will Graulich (born 1992), English professional rugby union player
