= James Goode =

James Goode may refer to:

- James Goode (rugby union) (born 1982), Welsh rugby union player
- James Moore Goode (1939–2019), American historian
- Jim Goode (1944–2016), American business
- Jamie Goode, British author

== See also ==
- James Good (disambiguation)
