= 2012 Namibian Tri-Nations =

Tournament details
- Host: Namibia
- Venue: Hage Geingob Stadium
- Date: 10 November 2012 – 17 November 2012
- Countries: Spain; Namibia; Zimbabwe
- Teams: 4

Final positions
- Champions: Spain
- Runner-up: Namibia

Tournament statistics
- Matches played: 3
- Tries scored: 21 (7 per match)

The Namibian Tri-Nations tournament (or Windhoek Lager Tri-Nations Rugby Series for sponsorship reasons) was designed to bring more international rugby union test matches to the lower tiered teams in the Confederation of African Rugby region. Originally, the hosts Namibia were invited to Europe by the International Rugby Board to play part in the 2012 International Rugby Series. However, Namibia turned the offer down to create their own tournament so they could bring more international rugby to the Namibian fans at home.

The tournament consisted of two further developing rugby nations: Europe's Spain and fellow African nation Zimbabwe. The tournament was played between November 10 and November 17, but was only played on three dedicated days at Namibia's national stadium, Hage Geingob Rugby Stadium in Windhoek. The tournament opened with the hosts playing Zimbabwe and ended again with the hosts, this time playing against Spain.

With the end result between Namibia and Spain, the European side won the tournament with two wins out of two.

== Table ==
Place	Nation	Games				Points			Bonus points		Table points
Place	Nation	Played	Won	Drawn	Lost	For	Against	Difference	4 Tries	7 Point Loss	Table points
1	Spain	2	2	0	0	85	51	+34	1	0	9
2	Namibia	2	1	0	1	74	71	+3	1	1	6
3	Zimbabwe	2	0	0	2	47	84	-37	1	1	2

== Matches ==
=== Namibia v Zimbabwe ===
10 November 2012
16:00 WAST (UTC+2)

Namibia	37–33	Zimbabwe
Try: Neel; Botha; Tromp; Redelinghuys; Con: Kotzé (1/4); Pen: Kotzé (4); Drop: Kotzé (1)	Report	Try: Makwanya; Penalty try Nemadire (2); Sithole; Con: Makwanya (1/5); Pen: Makwanya (2)

Hage Geingob Rugby Stadium, Windhoek
Referee: Marius Jonker (South Africa)

Namibia Coach: (Namibia) Johan Diergaardt	Zimbabwe Coach: (Zimbabwe) Brendon Dawson

=== Zimbabwe v Spain ===
14 November 2012
18:00 WAST (UTC+2)

Zimbabwe	14–47	Spain
Try: S Jones; Pen: Tichafara Makwanya (3)	Report	Try: Anaya (2); Magunazelaia; Sempere; C Smith; Tudela; Con: Carrión (3); Sempere; Pen: Carrión (3)

Hage Geingob Rugby Stadium, Windhoek
Referee: Jason Jaftha (South Africa)

Zimbabwe Coach: (Zimbabwe) Brendon Dawson	Spain Coach: (New Zealand) Bryce Bevin

=== Namibia v Spain ===
17 November 2012
16:00 WAST (UTC+2)

Namibia	37–38	Spain
Try: Nel de la Harpe; Tromp; Con: Kotzé (2/3); Pen: Kotzé (6/8)	Report	Try: Tudela; Pardo; Feijoo; Con: Javier Carrión (1/3); Pen: Javier Carrión (6/6); Jaime Nava (1/1); Drop: Jake Carter (0/1)

Hage Geingob Rugby Stadium, Windhoek
Attendance: 3,000
Referee: Marius Jonker (South Africa)

Namibia Coach: (Namibia) Johan Diergaardt	Spain Coach: (New Zealand) Bryce Bevin

== See also ==
- 2012 end-of-year rugby union tests
- 2012 mid-year rugby union tests
- 2012 International Rugby Series
