= James Good =

James Good may refer to:

- James Isaac Good (1850–1924), American clergyman and historian
- James W. Good (1866–1929), American politician
- James Winder Good (1877–1930), Irish political journalist and writer

== See also ==
- James Goode (disambiguation)
