= Andries Strauss =

South African rugby union player

- Full name: Andries Jacobus Strauss
- Born: 5 March 1984 (age 42) Pretoria, South Africa
- Height: 1.86 m (6 ft 1 in)
- Weight: 97 kg (214 lb; 15 st 4 lb)
- School: Grey College
- Notable relative(s): Richardt Strauss (brother); Adriaan Strauss (cousin)

Rugby union career
- Position: Centre
Youth career
- 2003–2005: Free State Cheetahs
Senior career
Years	Team	Apps	(Points)
2004–2005	Free State Cheetahs	8	(10)
2006–2010	Sharks	22	(5)
2006–2010	Sharks (Currie Cup)	80	(80)
2011–2012	Cheetahs	18	(15)
2011–2012	Free State Cheetahs	18	(20)
2013	Southern Kings	14	(0)
2013	Eastern Province Kings	0	(0)
2014–2016	Edinburgh	49	(10)
- Correct as of 21 June 2016
International career
Years	Team	Apps	(Points)
2003	South Africa Schools		
2004	South Africa Under-19		
2004	South Africa Under-21	2	(0)
2007	South Africa Sevens		
2010	South Africa	1	(0)
- Correct as of 23 February 2013

Andries Strauss (born 5 March 1984 in Pretoria, South Africa) is a former rugby union player that played as a centre.

== Career ==
=== Free State Cheetahs ===
After playing for the Free State Under-20 side in 2003, he was included in the senior side for the 2004 Vodacom Cup competition and made his debut for them in a match against the Falcons. He made his Currie Cup debut for the team later in 2004 against the SWD Eagles. He remained with the Bloemfontein-based side until the end of the 2005 season, before moving to Durban to join the Sharks.

=== Sharks ===
He made his Super Rugby debut in the Sharks', starting in opening match of the 2006 Super 14 season against the Chiefs. He quickly established himself as a regular, starting twelve of the Sharks' matches during the season.

He represented the teams at all levels – playing for the Sharks at Super Rugby level in 2006, 2008 and 2009, domestically for the Sharks in the Currie Cup between 2006 and 2010 and for the Natal Wildebeest in the 2007 and 2008 Vodacom Cup competitions, making in excess of one hundred appearances for the team at those various levels.

=== Return to the Cheetahs ===
In August 2010, Strauss signed a deal with the Cheetahs for the 2011 Super 15 season, due to the departure of Cheetahs centre Meyer Bosman who joined the Sharks the next season. In 2011 and 2012 Strauss made almost 40 appearances for the Cheetahs in Super Rugby and the Currie Cup and also played with his cousin Adriaan Strauss during this time.

=== Kings ===
He joined the Southern Kings for the 2013 Super Rugby season. He made his Kings debut in their first-ever Super Rugby match in 2013, a 22–10 victory over Australian side the Force. He started thirteen of their sixteen matches during the season – most of them as captain following an injury to regular captain Luke Watson. However, Strauss broke his hand towards the end of the campaign and missed the 2013 Super Rugby promotion/relegation play-offs, which saw the Lions gain entry into the 2014 Super Rugby season at the Kings' expense. He also missed the entire 2013 Currie Cup First Division season with the same injury.

=== Edinburgh ===
He signed for Scottish side Edinburgh Rugby at the start of 2014, tying him to the club until 2016. His first points for the club came during a Pro12 encounter with Cardiff Blues the following November.

=== Representative rugby ===
In November 2010, after an injury to stand-in full-back and centre Zane Kirchner, Strauss received a call-up to play for the Springboks to face a star-studded Barbarians side at Twickenham in a non-test match. Although it was a non-test match, this thus far, is his only appearance for the national team.

At youth level, he played for the South Africa Under-21 side, playing two matches for them in the 2004 Under 21 Rugby World Championship. He also represented the South Africa Sevens side during the 2006–07 IRB Sevens World Series competition.

== Personal life ==
Strauss is the brother of Irish international hooker Richardt Strauss, as well as the cousin for South African international hooker Adriaan Strauss.
