= Brad Field =

English rugby union player

- Born: Wellington, Somerset, England

Rugby union career
- Position: Scrum-Half
- Current team: Gloucester Rugby; Hartpury College R.F.C.
Youth career
- Wellington RFC
Senior career
Years	Team	Apps	(Points)
- Gloucester Rugby
–	Hartpury College R.F.C.		

Brad Field is an English professional rugby union coach and player who is dual registered and plays for both Hartpury College R.F.C. and Gloucester. In 2025, he was appointed club/head coach for Wellington RFC for the 2025–2026 season.
