= Matthew Cox (rugby union) =

- Born: Matthew Barry Cox; 6 March 1988 (age 38) Redditch, Worcestershire
- Height: 1.92 m (6 ft 4 in)
- Weight: 104 kg (16 st 5 lb)

Rugby union career
- Position(s): Lock, Flanker, No.8
Amateur team(s)
Years	Team	Apps	(Points)
- Woodrush RFC
Senior career
Years	Team	Apps	(Points)
2008-2010	Worcester Warriors	22	(20)
2010-2014	Gloucester Rugby	62	(15)
2014-2021	Worcester Warriors	80	(20)
National sevens team
Years	Team		Comps
–	England		

Matthew Cox (born 6 March 1988) is an English rugby union for Worcester Warriors in the Aviva Premiership. He plays as a flanker but can also play as a number eight and lock. He has represented England at many levels and also played for the Sevens side. He previously played for Gloucester.

On 7 June 2021, Cox announces his retirement from professional rugby at the end of the 2020–21 season.
