= Jonetani Ralulu =

Fiji international rugby union player

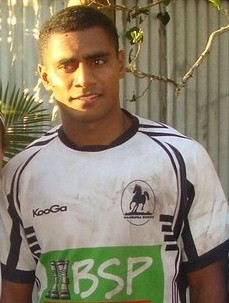
- Born: Jonetani Ralulu; 30 September 1986 (age 40) Sigatoka, Fiji
- Height: 1.89 m (6 ft 2 1/2 in)
- Weight: 90 kg (14 st 2 lb)

Rugby union career
- Position: Fly-half
Senior career
Years	Team	Apps	(Points)
2013-14	Lourdes	7	(6)
2014−	Farul Constanţa	2	(3)
- Correct as of 27 November 2014
International career
Years	Team	Apps	(Points)
2008-	Fiji	15	(44)
- Correct as of 27 November 2014

Jonetani Ralulu (born 30 September 1986 in Sigatoka, Fiji) is a Fijian rugby union player. He plays Fly-half for Fiji on international level. Ralulu also plays for the province, Nadroga.

Playing at fly-half for the Stallions during the Colonial Cup, Ralulu went on to feature for the Air Pacific Fiji Warriors in the IRB Pacific Rugby Cup. Held the record as the youngest player to feature in a Colonial Cup final when he finished on the winning side with the Stallions in 2007.

== International career ==
Ralulu made his debut for Fiji in 2008 against Samoa in the Pacific Nations Cup. He then was named in the sides 2012 end of year tour campaign. Ralulu took part in three out of the four matches, playing against Gloucester, Ireland XV and Georgia only missing the test against England.

Against	Pld	W	D	L	Tri	Con	Pen	DG	Pts	%Won
Georgia	1	1	0	0	0	1	4	0	14	100
Ireland XV	1	0	0	1	0	0	0	0	0	0
Japan	1	1	0	0	0	0	0	0	0	100
Samoa	2	1	0	1	0	0	0	0	0	50
Scotland	1	0	0	1	0	2	2	0	10	0
Tonga	3	2	0	1	0	2	0	0	4	66.67
Total	9	5	0	4	0	5	6	0	28	55.56

Pld = Games Played, W = Games Won, D = Games Drawn, L = Games Lost, Tri = Tries Scored, Con = Conversions, Pen = Penalties, DG = Drop Goals, Pts = Points Scored
