= Grigoraș Diaconescu =

Romania international rugby union player

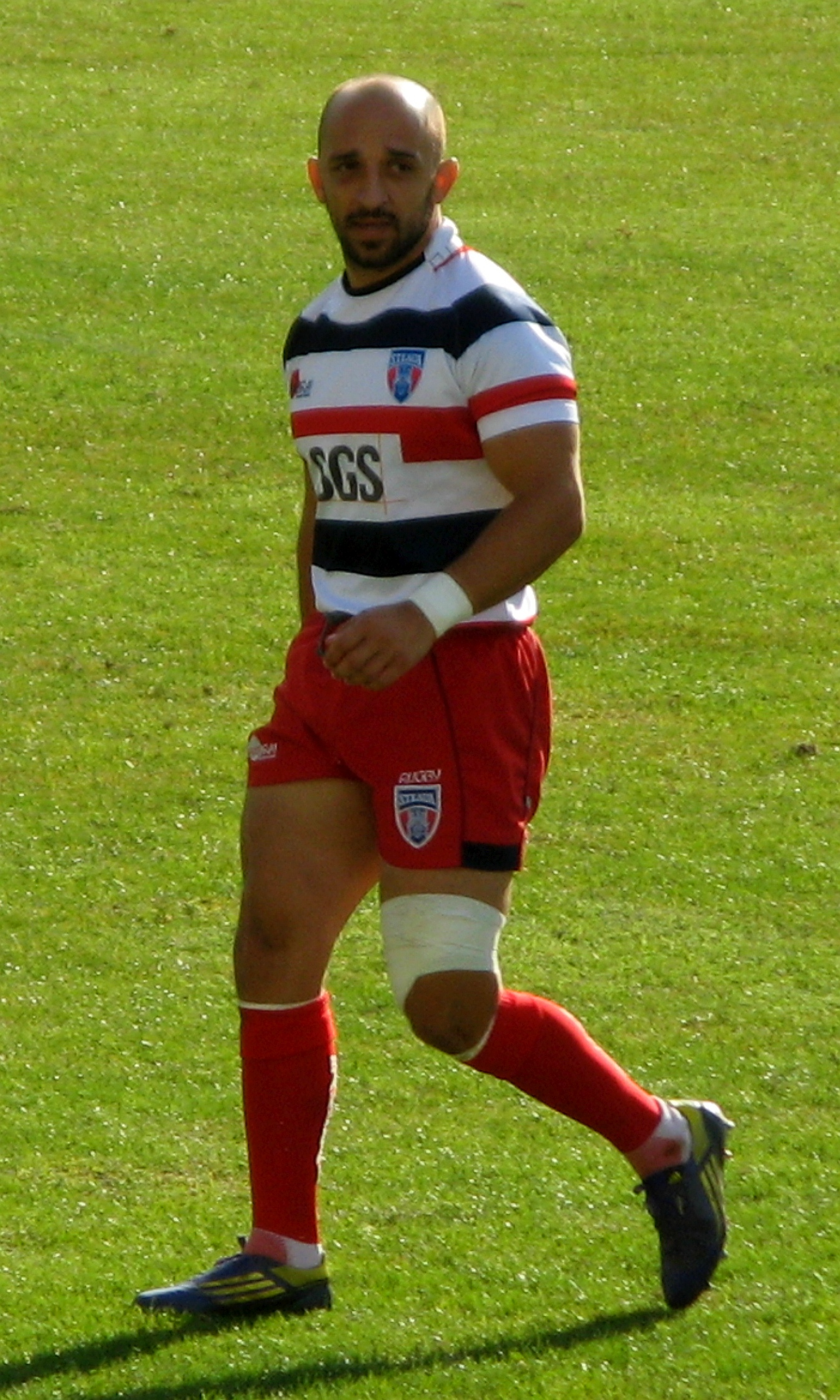
- Grigoraș Diaconescu playing for Steaua in 2017
- Full name: Grigoraș Diaconescu
- Born: 7 October 1982 (age 44) Pucioasa, Romania
- Height: 1.72 m (5 ft 7 1/2 in)
- Weight: 80 kg (12 st 8 lb; 180 lb)

Rugby union career
- Position: Scrum-half
- Current team: Steaua
Senior career
Years	Team	Apps	(Points)
2008	Périgueux		
2013	Saint Junien		
2008–	Steaua București	18	(0)
- Correct as of 15 September 2017
Provincial / State sides
Years	Team	Apps	(Points)
2011–15	București Wolves	16	(5)
- Correct as of 23 September 2017
International career
Years	Team	Apps	(Points)
2015–	Romania	1	(0)
- Correct as of 23 September 2017

Grigoraș Diaconescu (born 7 October 1982) is a Romanian rugby union football player. He plays as a scrum-half for professional SuperLiga club Steaua București. He also plays for Romania's national team, the Oaks, making his international debut during the 2015 season of 2014–16 European Nations Cup First Division in a match against the Os Lobos.

== Career ==
Besides playing for Steaua București, Grigoraș Diaconescu played for Périgueux and for a short period for Saint Junien.
