= Richardt Strauss =

Irish rugby union player

- Born: Conrad Richardt Strauss; 29 January 1986 (age 40) Pretoria, South Africa
- Height: 1.74 m (5 ft 9 in)
- Weight: 101 kg (15.9 st; 223 lb)
- School: Grey College, Bloemfontein
- Notable relative(s): Andries Strauss (brother); Adriaan Strauss (cousin)

Rugby union career
- Position: Hooker
Provincial / State sides
Years	Team	Apps	(Points)
2006–2009	Free State Cheetahs	54	(70)
2009—2018	Leinster	141	(55)
- Correct as of 7 March 2017
Super Rugby
Years	Team	Apps	(Points)
2007–2009	Cheetahs	36	(5)
- Correct as of 5 September 2015
International career
Years	Team	Apps	(Points)
2004–2005	South Africa U19		
2014–2018	Ireland Wolfhounds	2	
2012–2016	Ireland	17	(10)
- Correct as of 18 June 2016

Richardt Strauss (born 28 January 1986) is a former professional rugby union player who played as a hooker. Born in Pretoria, South Africa, he began his career with the Free State Cheetahs and played for the Cheetahs in Super Rugby before moving to Ireland to play for Leinster Rugby in 2009. After completing three years' residence in Ireland, Strauss qualified to play for the Ireland national team; he made 17 appearances between 2012 and 2016, including three at the 2015 Rugby World Cup. He is the brother of South Africa international Andries Strauss and the cousin of South Africa international Adriaan Strauss.

== Career ==
Strauss attended Grey College, Bloemfontein. He won the Under 19 Rugby World Championship in 2005 with South Africa. He played for the Free State Cheetahs in the Currie Cup, former club of other past and present Leinster players, Ollie Le Roux and CJ van der Linde. He scored 14 tries in 54 appearances for the Free State Cheetahs, winning the 2006 Currie Cup in the process. In 2007, Strauss joined the Cheetahs in the Super 14 playing in 36 games and scoring 1 try.

Strauss stayed with the Central Cheetahs until 2009 when he signed a contract with Heineken Cup champions Leinster Rugby. Strauss made his first appearance for Leinster as a substitute in their Celtic League victory over the Scarlets. Strauss played in his second game a week later as a substitute in Leinster's Celtic League win over the Cardiff Blues.

Since then, his Leinster career has gone from strength, racking up a total of 35 appearances – including 9 in the Heineken Cup – culminating in Leinster's 2nd Heineken Cup victory against Northampton Saints on 21 May 2011. By this stage, Strauss had established himself as a firm fan favourite and his barn-storming loose displays and solid set-piece played an integral part in Leinster's triumph.

In October 2013, Strauss was diagnosed with a heart condition that required surgery, ruling him out for the rest of the 2013–14 season. However, he made a surprising early return in Leinster's Heineken Cup round 6 pool match against the Ospreys on 17 January 2014. Strauss retired from professional rugby at the end of the 2017/18 season.

In 2012 Strauss became eligible to play for Ireland, and was named in the Irish team to play against his native South Africa on 10 November 2012, where he faced off in the front row against his cousin Adriaan Strauss.

Strauss made his second appearance for Ireland on 24 November 2012 against Argentina, scoring his first ever international try in the process. Strauss' brother Andries has played in a non-cap international for the Springboks against the Barbarians.

Strauss was named in the Ireland squad for the 2015 Rugby World Cup on 31 August 2015 and acquired Irish citizenship two days later on 2 September 2015, during the same citizenship ceremony as Ireland head coach Joe Schmidt.
