= Koree Britton =

English rugby union player

- Born: 4 March 1992 (age 34) Torquay, England
- Height: 1.80 m (5 ft 11 in)
- Weight: 107 kg (16 st 12 lb)

Rugby union career
- Position: Hooker
- Current team: London Welsh
Senior career
Years	Team	Apps	(Points)
2012–2014	Gloucester Rugby	30	(10)
2014-	London Welsh	30	(20)

Koree Britton (born 4 March 1992) is an English professional rugby union player who plays for London Welsh. From 2012, he played from Gloucester Rugby. On 2 April 2013, it was announced that Britton had signed a two-year contract extension to keep him at Gloucester until the end of the 2014–15 season. However, Britton left Gloucester as he signed for newly promoted side London Welsh from the 2014–15 season.
