= Kelemedi Bola =

Fijian rugby union footballer (born 1981)

- Born: Kelemedi Bolatagane; 7 July 1981 (age 45) Suva, Fiji
- Height: 1.78 m (5 ft 10 in)
- Weight: 95 kg (14 st 13 lb)

Rugby union career
- Position: Halfback
- Current team: Fiji Barbarians
International career
Years	Team	Apps	(Points)
2012	Fiji		
National sevens team
Years	Team		Comps
- Fiji

Kelemedi Bola (born 7 July 1981 in Suva, Fiji) is a Fijian rugby union footballer. He played halfback for the Fiji Barbarians.
