= Javier Carrión =

- Born: Javier Mario Carrión Llorens; 9 November 1990 (age 36) Godella, Spain
- Height: 1.88 m (6 ft 2 in)
- Weight: 100 kg (220 lb; 15 st 10 lb)

Rugby union career
Senior career
Years	Team	Apps	(Points)
2011-2022	La Vila		
International career
Years	Team	Apps	(Points)
2012-2020	Spain	11	
National sevens team
Years	Team		Comps
2011-2020	Spain		253
Coaching career
- Years: Team
- 2020-2021: La Vila (assistant coach)

Javier Mario Carrión Llorens (born 9 November 1990) is a former Spanish rugby sevens player and coach.

He made his debut with the Spain national rugby union team on November 14 of 2012, in a test match against Zimbabwe. With the national team he played 11 international caps. On the other hand, with Spanish rugby sevens team he made his debut in a tournament in London on May 21 of 2011. Between different tournaments and SVNS, he played a total of 253 caps.

With La Vila he achieved promotion to the División de Honor in the 2016-17 season.

He competed for the Spanish rugby sevens team at the 2016 Summer Olympics. He was part of the team that won the 2016 Men's Rugby Sevens Final Olympic Qualification Tournament in Monaco.

Carrión was also part of their 2013 Rugby World Cup Sevens squad.
