= 2012 Cup of Nations (rugby union) =

2012 Cup of Nations Venue The Sevens, Dubai
- Countries: United Arab Emirates Belgium; Hong Kong Zimbabwe
- Date: 8–14 December 2012
- Champions: Belgium (1st title)
- Runners-up: Hong Kong
- Matches played: 6

The 2012 Emirates Cup of Nations is the second Cup of Nations tournament to be hosted by the United Arab Emirates and will be again held at The Sevens Stadium in Dubai. This tournament acts as a year ending tournament for tier 3 teams from different continents and provides greater preparation for teams to play in their regional competitions.

The tournament is a joint initiative of the UAE Rugby Federation and the Hong Kong Rugby Football Union.

The four competing teams are hosts UAE, 2012 Asian Five Nations runners up Hong Kong, 2012 Africa Cup champions Zimbabwe and 2010-2012 European Nations Cup Division 1B champions Belgium.

Zimbabwe will send a weakened squad to the tournament, due to the clash with the 2012 South Africa Sevens, for which Zimbabwe has qualified.

An earlier draw for the event had six teams playing, with Papua New Guinea and Mexico playing alongside the four competing nations. However, both teams withdrew due to financial problems.

Belgium won the tournament, defeating defending champions Hong Kong on the third and final match day, 24-12. Hong Kong were runners up, with Zimbabwe taking third place, defeating United Arab Emirates.

== Format ==
The tournament is being played as a single round-robin, with the winner being the leading team after the third round of fixtures. The points for the tournament were awarded for: Win = 4 points Draw = 2 points Loss = 1 point Scoring 4 or more tries in one game = 1 bonus point Losing by 7 or less points = 1 bonus point

== Fixtures and results ==
Place	Nation	Games				Points			Bonus points	Table points
Place	Nation	Played	Won	Drawn	Lost	For	Against	Difference	Bonus points	Table points
1	Belgium (23)	3	3	0	0	146	26	+120	2	14
2	Hong Kong (28)	3	2	0	1	85	37	+48	1	9
3	Zimbabwe (30)	3	1	0	2	83	64	+19	1	5
4	United Arab Emirates (96)	3	0	0	3	23	210	-187	0	0

Pre-tournament rankings in parentheses

8 December 2012	United Arab Emirates	3 - 94	Belgium	The Sevens, Dubai
	Pen: James Ham	Report; Report 2	Try: Thibaut Andre 3, Alan Williams 4, Kevin Dams 3, Eliot van Trappen, Alain Mirialakis, Carlos Fierro, Maxime Jadot; Con: Alan Williams 12

8 December 2012	Hong Kong	22 - 7	Zimbabwe	The Sevens, Dubai
	Try: Tom McColl; Con: Christopher McAdam; Pen: Christopher McAdam 5 Cards: Johnathan Rees	Report; Report 2	Try: Steven Hunduza; Con: Linience Tambwera

11 December 2012	United Arab Emirates	6 - 51	Hong Kong	The Sevens, Dubai
	Pen: Chris Burch, James Ham	Report	Try: Stewart Megaw 2, Kenneth Hsieh, Sebastian Alfonsi, Ian Ridgeway, Nick Hewson, Salom Yiu Kam-shing, Alex Baddeley; Con: Mike Glancy 4 Pen: Mike Glancy

11 December 2012	Zimbabwe	11 - 28	Belgium	The Sevens, Dubai
	Try: Takunda Chifokoyo; Pen: Tichafara Makwanya 2 Cards: 3 yellows	Report; Report2	Try: Bastian Vermeylen, Mathieu Verschelden, Alan Williams, Penalty Try; Con: Sebastien Guns; Pen: Alan Williams 2 Cards: Alain Miriallakis (red card) 53'

14 December 2012	Belgium	24 - 12	Hong Kong	The Sevens, Dubai
	Try: Thomas de Molder, Sebastien Guns; Con: Alan Williams; Pen: Alan Williams 3, Carlos Fiero		Pen: Chris McAdam 4

14 December 2012	United Arab Emirates	14 - 65	Zimbabwe	The Sevens, Dubai
	Try: Ross Combe; Pen: James Ham 3	Report	Try: Kudakwashe Chiwanza 3, Shingi Mpofu, Takunda Chifokoyo, Simba Chirimuuta, Biselele Tshamala, Jan Ferreira, Tichafara Makwanya; Con: Lenience Tambwera 7 Pen: Lenience Tambwera 2

== See also ==
- 2011 Cup of Nations
- 2012 Asian Five Nations
- 2010–12 European Nations Cup First Division
- 2012 Africa Cup
