= Will Graulich =

English rugby union player

- Born: 5 October 1992 (age 34) Worcester, England
- Height: 1.93 m (6 ft 4 in)
- Weight: 106 kg (16 st 10 lb)

Rugby union career
- Position: Lock
Senior career
Years	Team	Apps	(Points)
- Gloucester Rugby
2013-	Cornish Pirates		

Will Graulich (born 5 October 1992) is an English professional rugby union player who plays for Cornish Pirates. He was previously part of Gloucester Rugby academy.

On 7 May 2013, Will Graulich would sign for the Championship side Cornish Pirates for the 2013/14 season, effectively leaving Gloucester.
