= James Goode (rugby union) =

- Born: 5 September 1982 (age 44) Cardiff, Wales
- Height: 2.01 m (6 ft 7 in)
- School: Whitchurch High School

Rugby union career
- Position: Lock
Senior career
Years	Team	Apps	(Points)
2005–07	Cardiff Blues	14	(0)
2010–13	Ospreys	15	(0)
2012–13	Newcastle Falcons	12	(0)
Provincial / State sides
Years	Team	Apps	(Points)
2007–09	Manawatu	29	(10)

James Goode (born 5 September 1982) is a Welsh rugby union player. He played for the Cardiff Blues in the Celtic League but left the team at the end of the 2007–08 season. He also played for the Manawatu Turbos in Palmerston North, New Zealand. Goode's position of choice is at lock. He began the 2011–12 season playing for the Ospreys, but has since moved to the Newcastle Falcons on loan.
