= List of 2018–19 Super Rugby transfers (New Zealand) =

This is a list of player movements for Super Rugby teams prior to the end of the 2019 Super Rugby season. Departure and arrivals of all players that were included in a Super Rugby squad for 2018 or 2019 are listed here, regardless of when it occurred. Future-dated transfers are only included if confirmed by the player or his agent, his former team or his new team.

== Blues ==
Blues transfers 2018–2019
Pos	2018 squad	Out	In	2019 squad
PR	Alex Hodgman; Sione Mafileo; Pauliasi Manu; Isaac Salmon (did not play); Mike Tamoaieta; Ofa Tu'ungafasi	(substituted off) Pauliasi Manu (to (Japan) Sunwolves); (substituted off) Isaac Salmon (to Tasman); (substituted off) Mike Tamoaieta (to North Harbour)	(substituted on) Lua Li (from North Harbour); (substituted on) Ezekiel Lindenmuth (from Auckland); (substituted on) Marcel Renata (from Hurricanes); (substituted on) Hisa Sasagi (from (England) Saracens); (substituted on) Karl Tu'inukuafe (from Chiefs)	Alex Hodgman; Lua Li (short-term); Ezekiel Lindenmuth; Sione Mafileo; Marcel Renata; Hisa Sasagi (short-term); Karl Tu'inukuafe; Ofa Tu'ungafasi
HK	Leni Apisai; Matt Moulds; James Parsons; Ross Wright (short-term)	(substituted off) Ross Wright (returned to Northland)		Leni Apisai; Matt Moulds; James Parsons
LK	Gerard Cowley-Tuioti; Lyndon Dunshea (short-term); Josh Goodhue; Matiaha Martin (short-term); Ben Nee-Nee (short-term); Jacob Pierce (short-term); Scott Scrafton; Patrick Tuipulotu	(substituted off) Lyndon Dunshea (returned to Auckland); (substituted off) Matiaha Martin (returned to Counties Manukau); (substituted off) Ben Nee-Nee (to North Harbour)		Gerard Cowley-Tuioti; Josh Goodhue; Jacob Pierce (did not play); Scott Scrafton; Patrick Tuipulotu
FL	Blake Gibson; Sione Havili (short-term); Jerome Kaino; Antonio Kiri Kiri (short-term); Dalton Papalii; Glenn Preston; Kara Pryor; Murphy Taramai; Jimmy Tupou	(substituted off) Sione Havili (to Tasman); (substituted off) Jerome Kaino (to (France) Toulouse); (substituted off) Antonio Kiri Kiri (to (England) Yorkshire Carnegie); (substituted off) Glenn Preston (to North Harbour); (substituted off) Kara Pryor (to (Japan) Sunwolves); (substituted off) Murphy Taramai (to North Harbour)	(substituted on) Jed Brown (from Tasman); (substituted on) Matt Matich (from Chiefs); (substituted on) Tom Robinson (from Northland); (substituted on) Hoskins Sotutu (from Auckland)	Jed Brown; Blake Gibson; Matt Matich (short-term); Dalton Papalii; Tom Robinson; Hoskins Sotutu; Jimmy Tupou (did not play)
N8	Akira Ioane			Akira Ioane
SH	Sam Nock; Augustine Pulu; Jonathan Ruru			Sam Nock; Augustine Pulu; Jonathan Ruru
FH	Otere Black (did not play); Bryn Gatland; Daniel Kirkpatrick; Stephen Perofeta	(substituted off) Bryn Gatland (to Highlanders); (substituted off) Daniel Kirkpatrick (to Auckland)	(substituted on) Harry Plummer (from Auckland)	Otere Black; Stephen Perofeta (did not play); Harry Plummer
CE	TJ Faiane; Terrence Hepetema (short-term); Matthew Johnson (did not play); Orbyn Leger (short-term); Tumua Manu (short-term); George Moala; Tamati Tua; Sonny Bill Williams	(substituted off) Terrence Hepetema (returned to Bay of Plenty); (substituted off) Matthew Johnson (to Southland); (substituted off) Orbyn Leger (to Chiefs); (substituted off) Tumua Manu (to Chiefs); (substituted off) George Moala (to (France) Clermont); (substituted off) Tamati Tua (to Northland)	(substituted on) Levi Aumua (from Chiefs); (substituted on) Ma'a Nonu (from (France) Toulon); (substituted on) Tanielu Tele’a (from Auckland)	Levi Aumua; TJ Faiane; Ma'a Nonu; Tanielu Tele’a; Sonny Bill Williams
WG	Caleb Clarke; Matt Duffie; Jordan Hyland (short-term); Rieko Ioane; Melani Nanai	(substituted off) Jordan Hyland (to Highlanders)		Caleb Clarke; Matt Duffie; Rieko Ioane; Melani Nanai
FB	Michael Collins; Jordan Trainor			Michael Collins; Jordan Trainor (did not play)
Coach	Tana Umaga	(substituted off) Tana Umaga (to assistant coach)	(substituted on) Leon MacDonald (from Tasman)	Leon MacDonald

== Chiefs ==
Chiefs transfers 2018–2019
Pos	2018 squad	Out	In	2019 squad
PR	Mitchell Graham (did not play); Kane Hames (did not play); Sefo Kautai; Nepo Laulala; Atunaisa Moli; Sam Prattley (short-term); Aidan Ross; Angus Ta'avao (short-term); Jeff Thwaites (short-term); Karl Tu’inukuafe (short-term)	(substituted off) Mitchell Graham (to Taranaki); (substituted off) Sam Prattley (to (Japan) Sunwolves); (substituted off) Jeff Thwaites (returned to Bay of Plenty); (substituted off) Karl Tu’inukuafe (to Blues)	(substituted on) Ryan Coxon (from Tasman); (substituted on) Tevita Mafileo (from Bay of Plenty); (substituted on) Reuben O'Neill (from Taranaki)	Ryan Coxon (short-term); Kane Hames (did not play); Sefo Kautai; Nepo Laulala; Tevita Mafileo (short-term); Atunaisa Moli; Reuben O'Neill (did not play); Aidan Ross; Angus Ta'avao
HK	Nathan Harris; Liam Polwart; Samisoni Taukei'aho		(substituted on) Bradley Slater (from Taranaki)	Nathan Harris; Liam Polwart; Bradley Slater (short-term); Samisoni Taukei'aho
LK	Michael Allardice; Tyler Ardron; Dominic Bird; Fin Hoeata (did not play); Brodie Retallick	(substituted off) Dominic Bird (to (France) Racing 92)	(substituted on) Daymon Leasuasu (from Counties Manukau); (substituted on) Laghlan McWhannell (from Waikato)	Michael Allardice; Tyler Ardron; Fin Hoeata (did not play); Daymon Leasuasu (short-term); Laghlan McWhannell (did not play); Brodie Retallick
FL	Lachlan Boshier; Sam Cane; Luke Jacobson; Mitchell Karpik; Matt Matich (short-term); Liam Messam; Jesse Parete (short-term); Taleni Seu; Pita Gus Sowakula (short-term)	(substituted off) Matt Matich (to Blues); (substituted off) Liam Messam (to (France) Toulon)	(substituted on) Mitch Jacobson (from Waikato)	Lachlan Boshier; Sam Cane; Luke Jacobson; Mitch Jacobson (short-term); Mitchell Karpik; Jesse Parete (short-term); Taleni Seu; Pita Gus Sowakula
N8	Mitchell Brown			Mitchell Brown
SH	Te Toiroa Tahuriorangi; Jonathan Taumateine; Brad Weber			Te Toiroa Tahuriorangi; Jonathan Taumateine; Brad Weber
FH	Tiaan Falcon; Luteru Laulala (short-term); Damian McKenzie	(substituted off) Luteru Laulala (returned to Counties Manukau)	(substituted on) Jack Debreczeni (from (Australia) Rebels); (substituted on) Stephen Donald (from (Japan) NEC Green Rockets); (substituted on) Orbyn Leger (from Blues)	Jack Debreczeni; Stephen Donald; Tiaan Falcon (did not play); Orbyn Leger (short-term); Damian McKenzie
CE	Johnny Fa'auli; Anton Lienert-Brown; Alex Nankivell; Charlie Ngatai; Bailyn Sullivan (short-term); Regan Verney (did not play)	(substituted off) Johnny Fa'auli (to (Japan) Toshiba Brave Lupus); (substituted off) Charlie Ngatai (to (France) Lyon); (substituted off) Regan Verney (to Northland)	(substituted on) Tumua Manu (from Blues)	Anton Lienert-Brown; Tumua Manu; Alex Nankivell; Bailyn Sullivan
WG	Solomon Alaimalo; Levi Aumua (did not play); Tim Nanai-Williams (did not play); Declan O'Donnell (short-term); Toni Pulu; Shaun Stevenson; Sean Wainui (short-term)	(substituted off) Levi Aumua (to Blues); (substituted off) Tim Nanai-Williams (to (France) Clermont); (substituted off) Declan O'Donnell (to Waikato); (substituted off) Toni Pulu (to (Australia) Brumbies)	(substituted on) Ataata Moeakiola (from (Japan) Tokai University); (substituted on) Etene Nanai-Seturo (from Counties Manukau)	Solomon Alaimalo; Ataata Moeakiola; Etene Nanai-Seturo; Shaun Stevenson; Sean Wainui
FB	Marty McKenzie; Sam McNicol (did not play)	(substituted off) Sam McNicol (injured)		Marty McKenzie
Coach	Colin Cooper			Colin Cooper

== Crusaders ==
Crusaders transfers 2018–2019
Pos	2018 squad	Out	In	2019 squad
PR	Michael Alaalatoa; Harry Allan (short-term); Donald Brighouse (short-term); Wyatt Crockett; Owen Franks; Oliver Jager; Chris King (short-term); Joe Moody; Tim Perry	(substituted off) Donald Brighouse (returned to Otago); (substituted off) Wyatt Crockett (to Tasman); (substituted off) Chris King (to Canterbury)	(substituted on) George Bower (from Otago); (substituted on) Isileli Tu'ungafasi (from Northland)	Michael Alaalatoa; Harry Allan; George Bower (short-term); Owen Franks; Oliver Jager; Joe Moody; Tim Perry; Isileli Tu'ungafasi (short-term)
HK	Sam Anderson-Heather (short-term); Ben Funnell; Andrew Makalio; Sebastian Siataga (short-term); Codie Taylor	(substituted off) Sam Anderson-Heather (returned to Otago); (substituted off) Sebastian Siataga (returned to Bay of Plenty)	(substituted on) Brodie McAlister (from Canterbury)	Ben Funnell; Andrew Makalio; Brodie McAlister (short-term); Codie Taylor
LK	Scott Barrett; Luke Romano; Quinten Strange; Sam Whitelock			Scott Barrett; Luke Romano; Quinten Strange; Sam Whitelock
FL	Heiden Bedwell-Curtis (short-term); Ethan Blackadder; Mitchell Dunshea; Billy Harmon; Pete Samu; Tom Sanders; Jordan Taufua; Matt Todd	(substituted off) Heiden Bedwell-Curtis (to Hurricanes); (substituted off) Pete Samu (to (Australia) Brumbies)		Ethan Blackadder; Mitchell Dunshea; Billy Harmon; Tom Sanders; Jordan Taufua; Matt Todd
N8	Kieran Read		(substituted on) Whetu Douglas (from (Italy) Benetton)	Whetu Douglas; Kieran Read
SH	Mitchell Drummond; Bryn Hall; Jack Stratton	(substituted off) Jack Stratton (to Waikato)	(substituted on) Ere Enari (from Canterbury)	Mitchell Drummond; Ere Enari; Bryn Hall
FH	Brett Cameron (short-term); Mike Delany; Mitchell Hunt; Richie Mo'unga	(substituted off) Mike Delany (to Bay of Plenty)		Brett Cameron; Mitchell Hunt; Richie Mo'unga
CE	Tim Bateman; Ryan Crotty; Jack Goodhue; Seta Tamanivalu	(substituted off) Seta Tamanivalu (to (France) Bordeaux)		Tim Bateman; Ryan Crotty; Jack Goodhue
WG	George Bridge; Braydon Ennor; Tima Fainga'anuku (short-term); Will Jordan (did not play); Jone Macilai-Tori; Manasa Mataele	(substituted off) Tima Fainga'anuku (returned to Tasman); (substituted off) Jone Macilai-Tori (to Northland)	(substituted on) Leicester Fainga'anuku (from Tasman); (substituted on) Ngane Punivai (from Canterbury); (substituted on) Sevu Reece (from Waikato)	George Bridge; Braydon Ennor; Leicester Fainga'anuku; Will Jordan; Manasa Mataele; Ngane Punivai; Sevu Reece (short-term)
FB	Israel Dagg; David Havili			Israel Dagg (did not play); David Havili
Coach	Scott Robertson			Scott Robertson

== Highlanders ==
Highlanders transfers 2018–2019
Pos	2018 squad	Out	In	2019 squad
PR	Daniel Lienert-Brown; Tyrel Lomax; Guy Millar; Aki Seiuli; Siate Tokolahi; Kalolo Tuiloma	(substituted off) Guy Millar (to (France) Biarritz); (substituted off) Aki Seiuli (injured); (substituted off) Kalolo Tuiloma (injured)	(substituted on) Sef Fa'agase (from (Australia) Reds); (substituted on) Josh Iosefa-Scott (from Waikato); (substituted on) Ayden Johnstone (from Waikato)	Sef Fa'agase; Josh Iosefa-Scott; Ayden Johnstone; Daniel Lienert-Brown; Tyrel Lomax; Siate Tokolahi
HK	Liam Coltman; Ash Dixon; Greg Pleasants-Tate	(substituted off) Greg Pleasants-Tate (to Canterbury)	(substituted on) Ricky Jackson (from Otago); (substituted on) Ray Niuia (from Tasman)	Liam Coltman; Ash Dixon; Ricky Jackson (short-term); Ray Niuia (did not play)
LK	Alex Ainley; Josh Dickson; Tom Franklin; Jackson Hemopo; Pari Pari Parkinson	(substituted off) Alex Ainley (to Tasman)	(substituted on) Jack Whetton (from Auckland)	Josh Dickson; Tom Franklin; Jackson Hemopo; Pari Pari Parkinson; Jack Whetton
FL	Shannon Frizell; Dillon Hunt; James Lentjes; Dan Pryor; Luke Whitelock	(substituted off) Dan Pryor (to (Japan) Sunwolves)		Shannon Frizell; Dillon Hunt; James Lentjes; Luke Whitelock
N8	Elliot Dixon; Marino Mikaele-Tu’u; Liam Squire			Elliot Dixon; Marino Mikaele-Tu’u; Liam Squire
SH	Kayne Hammington; Josh Renton; Aaron Smith	(substituted off) Josh Renton (to Otago)	(substituted on) Folau Fakatava (from Hawke's Bay)	Folau Fakatava; Kayne Hammington; Aaron Smith
FH	Josh Ioane; Fletcher Smith; Lima Sopoaga	(substituted off) Fletcher Smith (to Hurricanes); (substituted off) Lima Sopoaga (to (England) Wasps)	(substituted on) Marty Banks (from (Japan) NTT DoCoMo Red Hurricanes); (substituted on) Bryn Gatland (from Blues); (substituted on) Dan Hollinshead (from (Japan) Coca-Cola Red Sparks)	Marty Banks; Bryn Gatland; Dan Hollinshead (short-term); Josh Ioane
CE	Richard Buckman; Matt Faddes; Rob Thompson; Sio Tomkinson; Thomas Umaga-Jensen; Teihorangi Walden			Richard Buckman; Matt Faddes; Rob Thompson; Sio Tomkinson; Thomas Umaga-Jensen; Teihorangi Walden
WG	Tevita Li; Josh McKay; Tevita Nabura; Waisake Naholo		(substituted on) Jordan Hyland (from Blues)	Jordan Hyland (short-term); Tevita Li; Josh McKay; Tevita Nabura (did not play); Waisake Naholo
FB	Ben Smith			Ben Smith
Coach	Aaron Mauger			Aaron Mauger

== Hurricanes ==
Hurricanes transfers 2018–2019
Pos	2018 squad	Out	In	2019 squad
PR	Fraser Armstrong (short-term); Chris Eves; Alex Fidow; Ben May; Marcel Renata (short-term); Toby Smith; Jeffery Toomaga-Allen	(substituted off) Marcel Renata (to Blues)	(substituted on) Ross Geldenhuys (from (South Africa) Sharks); (substituted on) Xavier Numia (from Wellington)	Fraser Armstrong; Chris Eves; Alex Fidow; Ross Geldenhuys (short-term); Ben May; Xavier Numia (short-term); Toby Smith; Jeffery Toomaga-Allen
HK	Asafo Aumua; Dane Coles (did not play); James O'Reilly (short-term); Ricky Riccitelli; Nathan Vella (short-term)	(substituted off) Nathan Vella (to (Japan) Sunwolves)		Asafo Aumua; Dane Coles; James O'Reilly (short-term, did not play); Ricky Riccitelli
LK	James Blackwell (did not play); Murray Douglas; Michael Fatialofa; Sam Lousi; Isaia Walker-Leawere	(substituted off) Murray Douglas (to (Australia) Brumbies); (substituted off) Michael Fatialofa (to (England) Worcester Warriors)	(substituted on) Geoff Cridge (from Hawke's Bay); (substituted on) Andries Ferreira (from (South Africa) Lions); (substituted on) Kane Le'aupepe (from Bay of Plenty); (substituted on) Liam Mitchell (from Manawatu)	James Blackwell; Geoff Cridge (did not play); Andries Ferreira (short-term, did not play); Kane Le'aupepe (short-term); Sam Lousi (did not play); Liam Mitchell; Isaia Walker-Leawere
FL	Vaea Fifita; Sam Henwood; Reed Prinsep; Ardie Savea; Brad Shields	(substituted off) Brad Shields (to (England) Wasps)	(substituted on) Heiden Bedwell-Curtis (from Crusaders); (substituted on) Du'Plessis Kirifi (from Wellington)	Heiden Bedwell-Curtis; Vaea Fifita; Sam Henwood; Du'Plessis Kirifi; Reed Prinsep; Ardie Savea
N8	Gareth Evans; Blade Thomson	(substituted off) Blade Thomson (to (Wales) Scarlets)		Gareth Evans
SH	Jamie Booth; Finlay Christie; Richard Judd (short-term); TJ Perenara	(substituted off) Jamie Booth (to (Japan) Sunwolves)		Finlay Christie; Richard Judd; TJ Perenara
FH	Beauden Barrett; Jackson Garden-Bachop; TJ Va'a (did not play); Ihaia West	(substituted off) TJ Va'a (to Wellington); (substituted off) Ihaia West (to (France) La Rochelle)	(substituted on) Fletcher Smith (from Highlanders)	Beauden Barrett; Jackson Garden-Bachop; Fletcher Smith
CE	Vince Aso; Wes Goosen; Ngani Laumape; Matt Proctor; Peter Umaga-Jensen		(substituted on) Billy Proctor (from Wellington)	Vince Aso; Wes Goosen; Ngani Laumape; Billy Proctor; Matt Proctor; Peter Umaga-Jensen (short-term)
WG	Ben Lam; Jonah Lowe; Julian Savea	(substituted off) Julian Savea (to (France) Toulon)	(substituted on) James Marshall (from (England) London Irish); (substituted on) Salesi Rayasi (from Auckland)	Ben Lam; Jonah Lowe; James Marshall; Salesi Rayasi
FB	Jordie Barrett; Nehe Milner-Skudder		(substituted on) Chase Tiatia (from Bay of Plenty); (substituted on) Danny Toala (from Hawke's Bay)	Jordie Barrett; Nehe Milner-Skudder (did not play); Chase Tiatia (short-term); Danny Toala (short-term)
Coach	Chris Boyd	(substituted off) Chris Boyd (to (England) Northampton Saints)	(substituted on) John Plumtree (from assistant coach)	John Plumtree

== See also ==
- List of 2018–19 Premiership Rugby transfers
- List of 2018–19 Pro14 transfers
- List of 2018–19 Top 14 transfers
- List of 2018–19 RFU Championship transfers
- SANZAAR
- Super Rugby franchise areas
