= List of 2017–18 Super Rugby transfers (New Zealand) =

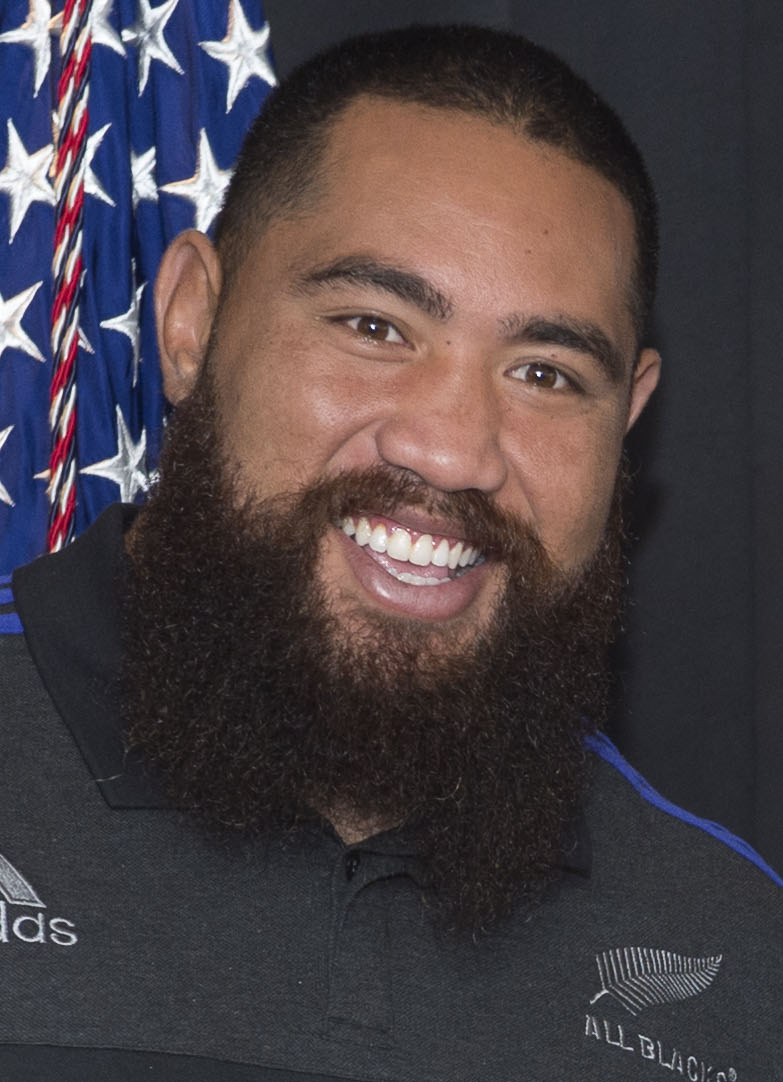
New Zealand prop Charlie Faumuina ended a nine-year spell at the Blues to join Top 14 side Toulouse.

This is a list of New Zealand player movements for Super Rugby teams prior to the end of the 2018 Super Rugby season. Departure and arrivals of all players that were included in a Super Rugby squad for 2017 or 2018 are listed here, regardless of when it occurred. Future-dated transfers are only included if confirmed by the player or his agent, his former team or his new team.

In addition to the main squad, teams can also name additional players that train in backup or development squads for the franchises. These players are denoted by (wider training group).

== Notes ==
- 2017 players listed are all players that were named in the initial senior squad, or subsequently included in a 23-man match day squad at any game during the season.
- (did not play) denotes that a player did not play at all during one of the two seasons due to injury or non-selection. These players are included to indicate they were contracted to the team.
- (short-term) denotes that a player wasn't initially contracted, but came in during the season. This could either be a club rugby player coming in as injury cover, or a player whose contract had expired at another team (typically in the northern hemisphere).
- Flags are only shown for players moving to or from another country.
- Players may play in several positions, but are listed in only one.

=== Blues ===
Blues transfers 2017–2018
Pos	2017 squad	Out	In	2018 squad
PR	Charlie Faumuina; Alex Hodgman; Sione Mafileo; Pauliasi Manu; Sam Prattley; Ofa Tu'ungafasi	(substituted off) Charlie Faumuina (to (France) Toulouse); (substituted off) Sam Prattley (to Chiefs)	(substituted on) Isaac Salmon (from Tasman); (substituted on) Mike Tamoaieta (from North Harbour)	Alex Hodgman; Sione Mafileo; Pauliasi Manu; Isaac Salmon (did not play); Mike Tamoaieta; Ofa Tu'ungafasi
HK	Epalahame Faiva; Matt Moulds; James Parsons	(substituted off) Epalahame Faiva (to Waikato)	(substituted on) Leni Apisai (from Hurricanes); (substituted on) Ross Wright (from Northland)	Leni Apisai; Matt Moulds; James Parsons; Ross Wright (short-term)
LK	Gerard Cowley-Tuioti; Josh Goodhue; Brandon Nansen (did not play); Leighton Price (short-term); Scott Scrafton; Patrick Tuipulotu; Jimmy Tupou	(substituted off) Brandon Nansen (to North Harbour); (substituted off) Leighton Price (to Taranaki)	(substituted on) Lyndon Dunshea (from Auckland); (substituted on) Matiaha Martin (from Counties Manukau); (substituted on) Ben Nee-Nee (from Auckland); (substituted on) Jacob Pierce (from Auckland)	Gerard Cowley-Tuioti; Lyndon Dunshea (short-term); Josh Goodhue; Matiaha Martin (short-term); Ben Nee-Nee (short-term); Jacob Pierce (short-term); Scott Scrafton; Patrick Tuipulotu; Jimmy Tupou
FL	Blake Gibson; Jerome Kaino; Steve Luatua; Kara Pryor; Murphy Taramai	(substituted off) Steve Luatua (to (England) Bristol)	(substituted on) Sione Havili (from Auckland); (substituted on) Antonio Kiri Kiri (from Manawatu); (substituted on) Dalton Papalii (from Auckland); (substituted on) Glenn Preston (from North Harbour)	Blake Gibson; Sione Havili (short-term); Jerome Kaino; Antonio Kiri Kiri (short-term); Dalton Papalii; Glenn Preston; Kara Pryor; Murphy Taramai
N8	Akira Ioane			Akira Ioane
SH	Billy Guyton; Sam Nock; Augustine Pulu	(substituted off) Billy Guyton (to Tasman)	(substituted on) Jonathan Ruru (from Otago)	Sam Nock; Augustine Pulu; Jonathan Ruru
FH	Piers Francis; Bryn Gatland (short-term); Stephen Perofeta; Ihaia West	(substituted off) Piers Francis (to (England) Northampton Saints); (substituted off) Ihaia West (to Hurricanes)	(substituted on) Otere Black (from Hurricanes); (substituted on) Daniel Kirkpatrick (from (France) Albi)	Otere Black (did not play); Bryn Gatland; Daniel Kirkpatrick; Stephen Perofeta
CE	TJ Faiane; George Moala; Rene Ranger; Matt Vaega (did not play); Sonny Bill Williams	(substituted off) Rene Ranger (to (France) La Rochelle); (substituted off) Matt Vaega (to North Harbour)	(substituted on) Terrence Hepetema (from Bay of Plenty); (substituted on) Matthew Johnson (from Southland); (substituted on) Orbyn Leger (from Counties Manukau); (substituted on) Tumua Manu (from Auckland); (substituted on) Tamati Tua (from Northland)	TJ Faiane; Terrence Hepetema (short-term); Matthew Johnson (did not play); Orbyn Leger (short-term); Tumua Manu (short-term); George Moala; Tamati Tua; Sonny Bill Williams
WG	Matt Duffie; Rieko Ioane; Melani Nanai; Declan O'Donnell	(substituted off) Declan O'Donnell (to Chiefs)	(substituted on) Caleb Clarke (from Auckland); (substituted on) Jordan Hyland (from Northland)	Caleb Clarke; Matt Duffie; Jordan Hyland (short-term); Rieko Ioane; Melani Nanai
FB	Michael Collins; Jordan Trainor			Michael Collins; Jordan Trainor
Coach	Tana Umaga			Tana Umaga

=== Chiefs ===
Chiefs transfers 2017–2018
Pos	2017 squad	Out	In	2018 squad
PR	Siegfried Fisiihoi; Mitchell Graham (did not play); Kane Hames; Sefo Kautai; Nepo Laulala; Atunaisa Moli; Aidan Ross	(substituted off) Siegfried Fisiihoi (to (France) Stade Français)	(substituted on) Sam Prattley (from Blues); (substituted on) Angus Ta'avao (from (Australia) Waratahs); (substituted on) Jeff Thwaites (from Bay of Plenty); (substituted on) Karl Tu'inukuafe (from North Harbour)	Mitchell Graham (did not play); Kane Hames (did not play); Sefo Kautai; Nepo Laulala; Atunaisa Moli; Sam Prattley (short-term); Aidan Ross; Angus Ta'avao (short-term); Jeff Thwaites (short-term); Karl Tu'inukuafe (short-term)
HK	Hika Elliot; Nathan Harris; Brayden Mitchell (short-term); Liam Polwart; Sebastian Siataga (short-term); Samisoni Taukei'aho (short-term)	(substituted off) Hika Elliot (to (France) Oyonnax); (substituted off) Brayden Mitchell (to Southland); (substituted off) Sebastian Siataga (to Crusaders)		Nathan Harris; Liam Polwart; Samisoni Taukei'aho
LK	Michael Allardice; Dominic Bird; Matiaha Martin (did not play); Brodie Retallick; James Tucker	(substituted off) Matiaha Martin (to Counties Manukau); (substituted off) James Tucker (to Waikato)	(substituted on) Fin Hoeata (from Taranaki)	Michael Allardice; Dominic Bird; Fin Hoeata (did not play); Brodie Retallick
FL	Lachlan Boshier; Sam Cane; Mitchell Karpik; Liam Messam; Tom Sanders; Taleni Seu	(substituted off) Tom Sanders (to Crusaders)	(substituted on) Tyler Ardron (from (Wales) Ospreys); (substituted on) Luke Jacobson (from Waikato); (substituted on) Matt Matich (from Northland); (substituted on) Jesse Parete (from Bay of Plenty); (substituted on) Pita Gus Sowakula (from Taranaki)	Tyler Ardron; Lachlan Boshier; Sam Cane; Luke Jacobson; Mitchell Karpik; Matt Matich (short-term); Liam Messam; Jesse Parete (short-term); Taleni Seu; Pita Gus Sowakula (short-term)
N8	Mitchell Brown; Michael Leitch	(substituted off) Michael Leitch (to (Japan) Sunwolves)		Mitchell Brown
SH	Finlay Christie; Tawera Kerr-Barlow; Jonathan Taumateine; Brad Weber (did not play)	(substituted off) Finlay Christie (to Hurricanes); (substituted off) Tawera Kerr-Barlow (to (France) La Rochelle)	(substituted on) Te Toiroa Tahuriorangi (from Hurricanes)	Te Toiroa Tahuriorangi; Jonathan Taumateine; Brad Weber
FH	Aaron Cruden; Stephen Donald	(substituted off) Aaron Cruden (to (France) Montpellier); (substituted off) Stephen Donald (to Counties Manukau)	(substituted on) Tiaan Falcon (from Hawke's Bay); (substituted on) Luteru Laulala (from Counties Manukau); (substituted on) Marty McKenzie (from Crusaders)	Tiaan Falcon; Luteru Laulala (short-term); Marty McKenzie
CE	Johnny Fa'auli; Anton Lienert-Brown; Alex Nankivell (short-term); Charlie Ngatai		(substituted on) Baylin Sullivan (from Waikato); (substituted on) Regan Verney (from Wellington)	Johnny Fa'auli; Anton Lienert-Brown; Alex Nankivell; Charlie Ngatai; Baylin Sullivan (short-term); Regan Verney (did not play)
WG	Solomon Alaimalo; Glen Fisiiahi (did not play); James Lowe; Tim Nanai-Williams; Toni Pulu; Shaun Stevenson; Chase Tiatia (did not play)	(substituted off) Glen Fisiiahi (to Counties Manukau); (substituted off) James Lowe (to (Ireland) Leinster); (substituted off) Chase Tiatia (to Bay of Plenty)	(substituted on) Levi Aumua (from Tasman); (substituted on) Declan O'Donnell (from Blues); (substituted on) Sean Wainui (from Crusaders)	Solomon Alaimalo; Levi Aumua (did not play); Tim Nanai-Williams (did not play); Declan O'Donnell (short-term); Toni Pulu; Shaun Stevenson; Sean Wainui (short-term)
FB	Damian McKenzie; Sam McNicol			Damian McKenzie; Sam McNicol (did not play)
Coach	Dave Rennie	(substituted off) Dave Rennie (to (Scotland) Glasgow Warriors)	(substituted on) Colin Cooper (from Taranaki)	Colin Cooper

=== Crusaders ===
Crusaders transfers 2017–2018
Pos	2017 squad	Out	In	2018 squad
PR	Michael Alaalatoa; Wyatt Crockett; Owen Franks; Oliver Jager; Joe Moody; Tim Perry		(substituted on) Harry Allan (from Canterbury); (substituted on) Donald Brighouse (from Otago); (substituted on) Chris King (from (France) Pau)	Michael Alaalatoa; Harry Allan (short-term); Donald Brighouse (short-term); Wyatt Crockett; Owen Franks; Oliver Jager; Chris King (short-term); Joe Moody; Tim Perry
HK	Ben Funnell; Andrew Makalio; Codie Taylor		(substituted on) Sam Anderson-Heather (from Otago); (substituted on) Sebastian Siataga (from Chiefs)	Sam Anderson-Heather (short-term); Ben Funnell; Andrew Makalio; Sebastian Siataga (short-term); Codie Taylor
LK	Scott Barrett; Luke Romano; Quinten Strange; Sam Whitelock			Scott Barrett; Luke Romano; Quinten Strange; Sam Whitelock
FL	Heiden Bedwell-Curtis; Jed Brown; Mitchell Dunshea; Vernon Fredericks (short-term); Pete Samu; Jordan Taufua; Matt Todd	(substituted off) Jed Brown (to Canterbury); (substituted off) Vernon Fredericks (to Tasman)	(substituted on) Ethan Blackadder (from Tasman); (substituted on) Billy Harmon (from Canterbury); (substituted on) Tom Sanders (from Chiefs)	Heiden Bedwell-Curtis (short-term); Ethan Blackadder; Mitchell Dunshea; Billy Harmon; Pete Samu; Tom Sanders; Jordan Taufua; Matt Todd
N8	Whetu Douglas (short-term); Kieran Read	(substituted off) Whetu Douglas (to (Italy) Benetton)		Kieran Read
SH	Mitchell Drummond; Ere Enari (short-term); Leon Fukofuka; Bryn Hall	(substituted off) Ere Enari (injured); (substituted off) Leon Fukofuka (to Auckland)	(substituted on) Jack Stratton (from Canterbury)	Mitchell Drummond; Bryn Hall; Jack Stratton
FH	Mitchell Hunt; Marty McKenzie; Richie Mo'unga	(substituted off) Marty McKenzie (to Chiefs)	(substituted on) Brett Cameron (from Canterbury); (substituted on) Mike Delany (from Bay of Plenty)	Brett Cameron (short-term); Mike Delany; Mitchell Hunt; Richie Mo'unga
CE	Tim Bateman; Ryan Crotty; Jack Goodhue; Seta Tamanivalu; Sean Wainui	(substituted off) Sean Wainui (to Chiefs)		Tim Bateman; Ryan Crotty; Jack Goodhue; Seta Tamanivalu
WG	George Bridge; Sione Fifita (did not play); Digby Ioane; Jone Macilai-Tori (did not play); Manasa Mataele	(substituted off) Sione Fifita (to Counties Manukau); (substituted off) Digby Ioane (to (Japan) Panasonic Wild Knights)	(substituted on) Tima Fainga'anuku (from Tasman); (substituted on) Braydon Ennor (from Canterbury); (substituted on) Will Jordan (from Tasman)	George Bridge; Braydon Ennor; Tima Fainga'anuku (short-term); Will Jordan (did not play); Jone Macilai-Tori; Manasa Mataele
FB	Israel Dagg; David Havili			Israel Dagg; David Havili
Coach	Scott Robertson			Scott Robertson

=== Highlanders ===
Highlanders transfers 2017–2018
Pos	2017 squad	Out	In	2018 squad
PR	Siua Halanukonuka; Daniel Lienert-Brown; Craig Millar; Guy Millar; Aki Seiuli; Siate Tokolahi	(substituted off) Siua Halanukonuka (to (Scotland) Glasgow Warriors); (substituted off) Craig Millar (to (Japan) Sunwolves)	(substituted on) Tyrel Lomax (from (Australia) Rebels); (substituted on) Kalolo Tuiloma (from Counties Manukau)	Daniel Lienert-Brown; Tyrel Lomax; Guy Millar; Aki Seiuli; Siate Tokolahi; Kalolo Tuiloma
HK	Liam Coltman; Ash Dixon; Greg Pleasants-Tate; Sekonaia Pole (short-term); Adrian Smith (short-term)	(substituted off) Sekonaia Pole (to Otago); (substituted off) Adrian Smith (to North Harbour)		Liam Coltman; Ash Dixon; Greg Pleasants-Tate
LK	Alex Ainley; Josh Dickson (did not play); Tom Franklin; Jackson Hemopo; Joe Wheeler	(substituted off) Joe Wheeler (returned to (Japan) Suntory Sungoliath)	(substituted on) Pari Pari Parkinson (from Tasman)	Alex Ainley; Josh Dickson; Tom Franklin; Jackson Hemopo; Pari Pari Parkinson
FL	Shane Christie (did not play); Gareth Evans; Dillon Hunt (short-term); James Lentjes; Dan Pryor; Tupou Sopoaga (short-term); Luke Whitelock	(substituted off) Shane Christie (to Tasman); (substituted off) Gareth Evans (to Hurricanes); (substituted off) Tupou Sopoaga (to Southland)	(substituted on) Shannon Frizell (from Tasman)	Shannon Frizell; Dillon Hunt; James Lentjes; Dan Pryor; Luke Whitelock
N8	Elliot Dixon; Liam Squire		(substituted on) Marino Mikaele-Tu'u (from Hawke's Bay)	Elliot Dixon; Marino Mikaele-Tu'u; Liam Squire
SH	Kayne Hammington; Josh Renton; Aaron Smith			Kayne Hammington; Josh Renton; Aaron Smith
FH	Marty Banks; Hayden Parker (did not play); Fletcher Smith; Lima Sopoaga	(substituted off) Marty Banks (to (Italy) Benetton); (substituted off) Hayden Parker (to (Japan) Sunwolves)	(substituted on) Josh Ioane (from Otago)	Josh Ioane; Fletcher Smith; Lima Sopoaga
CE	Jason Emery (did not play); Matt Faddes; Malakai Fekitoa; Rob Thompson; Sio Tomkinson; Teihorangi Walden	(substituted off) Jason Emery (to (Japan) Sunwolves); (substituted off) Malakai Fekitoa (to (France) Toulon)	(substituted on) Thomas Umaga-Jensen (from Wellington)	Matt Faddes; Rob Thompson; Sio Tomkinson; Thomas Umaga-Jensen; Teihorangi Walden
WG	Richard Buckman; Tevita Li; Waisake Naholo; Patrick Osborne	(substituted off) Patrick Osborne (returned to (Japan) Kubota Spears)	(substituted on) Josh McKay (from Canterbury); (substituted on) Tevita Nabura (from Counties Manukau)	Richard Buckman; Tevita Li; Josh McKay; Tevita Nabura; Waisake Naholo
FB	Ben Smith			Ben Smith
Coach	Tony Brown	(substituted off) Tony Brown (to Japan (assistant))	(substituted on) Aaron Mauger (from (England) Leicester Tigers)	Aaron Mauger

=== Hurricanes ===
Hurricanes transfers 2017–2018
Pos	2017 squad	Out	In	2018 squad
PR	Chris Eves; Reggie Goodes (did not play); Mike Kainga; Ben May; Jeffery Toomaga-Allen; Loni Uhila	(substituted off) Reggie Goodes (retired); (substituted off) Mike Kainga (to Taranaki); (substituted off) Loni Uhila (to (France) Clermont)	(substituted on) Fraser Armstrong (from Manawatu); (substituted on) Alex Fidow (from Wellington); (substituted on) Marcel Renata (from Auckland); (substituted on) Toby Smith (from (Australia) Rebels)	Fraser Armstrong (short-term); Chris Eves; Alex Fidow; Ben May; Marcel Renata (short-term); Toby Smith; Jeffery Toomaga-Allen
HK	Leni Apisai; Dane Coles; James O'Reilly (short-term); Ricky Riccitelli	(substituted off) Leni Apisai (to Blues)	(substituted on) Asafo Aumua (from Wellington); (substituted on) Nathan Vella (from Canterbury)	Asafo Aumua; Dane Coles (did not play); James O'Reilly (short-term); Ricky Riccitelli; Nathan Vella (short-term)
LK	Mark Abbott; James Blackwell; James Broadhurst (did not play); Geoffrey Cridge (did not play); Michael Fatialofa; Sam Lousi	(substituted off) Mark Abbott (to (Japan) Coca-Cola Red Sparks); (substituted off) James Broadhurst (retired); (substituted off) Geoffrey Cridge (to Hawke's Bay)	(substituted on) Murray Douglas (from (Australia) Rebels); (substituted on) Isaia Walker-Leawere (from Wellington)	James Blackwell (did not play); Murray Douglas; Michael Fatialofa; Sam Lousi; Isaia Walker-Leawere
FL	Vaea Fifita; Callum Gibbins; Toa Halafihi; Reed Prinsep; Hugh Renton; Ardie Savea; Brad Shields	(substituted off) Callum Gibbins (to (Scotland) Glasgow Warriors); (substituted off) Toa Halafihi (to (France) Lyon); (substituted off) Hugh Renton (to Hawke's Bay)	(substituted on) Gareth Evans (from Highlanders); (substituted on) Sam Henwood (from Counties Manukau)	Gareth Evans; Vaea Fifita; Sam Henwood; Reed Prinsep; Ardie Savea; Brad Shields
N8	Blade Thomson			Blade Thomson
SH	Kylem O'Donnell (did not play); TJ Perenara; Chris Smylie (short-term); Te Toiroa Tahuriorangi	(substituted off) Kylem O'Donnell (to Taranaki); (substituted off) Chris Smylie (to North Harbour); (substituted off) Te Toiroa Tahuriorangi (to Chiefs)	(substituted on) Jamie Booth (from Manawatu); (substituted on) Finlay Christie (from Chiefs); (substituted on) Richard Judd (from Bay of Plenty)	Jamie Booth; Finlay Christie; Richard Judd (short-term); TJ Perenara
FH	Beauden Barrett; Otere Black	(substituted off) Otere Black (to Blues)	(substituted on) Jackson Garden-Bachop (from (Australia) Rebels); (substituted on) TJ Va'a (from Wellington); (substituted on) Ihaia West (from Blues)	Beauden Barrett; Jackson Garden-Bachop; TJ Va'a (did not play); Ihaia West
CE	Pita Ahki; Vince Aso; Ngani Laumape; Matt Proctor; Peter Umaga-Jensen (did not play)	(substituted off) Pita Ahki (to (Ireland) Connacht)		Vince Aso; Ngani Laumape; Matt Proctor; Peter Umaga-Jensen
WG	Wes Goosen; Cory Jane; Ben Lam; Julian Savea	(substituted off) Cory Jane (returned to (Japan) Toshiba Brave Lupus)	(substituted on) Jonah Lowe (from Hawke's Bay)	Wes Goosen; Ben Lam; Jonah Lowe; Julian Savea
FB	Jordie Barrett; Nehe Milner-Skudder			Jordie Barrett; Nehe Milner-Skudder
Coach	Chris Boyd			Chris Boyd

== See also ==
- List of 2017–18 Premiership Rugby transfers
- List of 2017–18 Pro14 transfers
- List of 2017–18 Top 14 transfers
- List of 2017–18 RFU Championship transfers
- SANZAAR
- Super Rugby franchise areas
