= 2018 Super Rugby season =

Men's rugby union club competition

- Countries: Argentina (1 team); Australia (4 teams); Japan (1 team); New Zealand (5 teams); South Africa (4 teams)
- Tournament format(s): Conference and knockout
- Champions: Crusaders (9th title)
- Matches played: 127
- Tries scored: 925 (7.28 per match)
- Top point scorer(s): Bernard Foley, Waratahs (223)
- Top try scorer(s): Ben Lam, Hurricanes (16)
- Official website: Official site

The 2018 Super Rugby season was the 23rd season of Super Rugby, an annual rugby union competition organised by SANZAAR between teams from Argentina, Australia, Japan, New Zealand and South Africa. After two seasons in which 18 teams participated, the 2018 season reverted to a 15-team competition, consisting of three geographical conferences.

The South African Rugby Union announced that the Cheetahs and Southern Kings would be dropped for the 2018 season, while the Australian Rugby Union, now known as Rugby Australia, announced the exclusion of the Force. The South African franchises thereafter entered the newly renamed Pro14 competition, while the Western Force took part in the National Rugby Championship, the domestic Australia competition, while preparing to enter the new Global Rapid Rugby competition in 2019.

== Competition format ==
The 15 participating teams are divided into three geographical conferences: the Australian Conference (consisting of four Australian teams and the Japanese Sunwolves), the New Zealand Conference (consisting of five New Zealand teams), and the South African Conference (consisting of four South African teams and the Jaguares from Argentina).

In the group stages, there are 19 rounds of matches, with each team playing 16 matches and having two rounds of byes, resulting in a total of 120 matches. Teams play eight inter-conference matches and eight cross-conference matches; they play all the other teams in their conference twice - once at home and once away - and play once against four of the teams in each of the other two conferences.

The top team in each of the three conferences qualify for the quarterfinals, as do the next five teams with the best records across the three conferences, known as wildcards. The conference winners and best wildcard team hosted the quarterfinals. The quarterfinal winners progressed to the semifinal, and the winners of the semifinals advanced to the final.

== Standings ==
=== Conference standings ===
Australian conference
Pos	Team	Pts
1	Waratahs	44
2	Rebels	36
3	Brumbies	34
4	Reds	28
5	Sunwolves	14

New Zealand conference
Pos	Team	Pts
1	Crusaders	63
2	Hurricanes	51
3	Chiefs	49
4	Highlanders	44
5	Blues	22

South African conference
Pos	Team	Pts
1	Lions	46
2	Jaguares	38
3	Sharks	36
4	Stormers	29
5	Bulls	29

=== Overall standings ===
2018 Super Rugby standings
Pos	Team	Pld	W	D	L	PF	PA	PD	TF	TA	TB	LB	Pts	Qualification
1	Crusaders (C)	16	14	0	2	542	295	+247	77	39	7	0	63	Quarter-finals (Conference leaders)
2	Lions	16	9	0	7	519	435	+84	77	55	6	4	46	Quarter-finals (Conference leaders)
3	Waratahs	16	9	1	6	557	445	+112	74	59	4	2	44	Quarter-finals (Conference leaders)
4	Hurricanes	16	11	0	5	474	343	+131	66	43	5	2	51	Quarter-finals (Wildcard)
5	Chiefs	16	11	0	5	463	368	+95	60	48	3	2	49	Quarter-finals (Wildcard)
6	Highlanders	16	10	0	6	437	445	−8	59	57	3	1	44	Quarter-finals (Wildcard)
7	Jaguares	16	9	0	7	409	418	−9	51	55	2	0	38	Quarter-finals (Wildcard)
8	Sharks	16	7	1	8	437	442	−5	49	57	2	4	36	Quarter-finals (Wildcard)
9	Rebels	16	7	0	9	440	461	−21	57	60	5	3	36	
10	Brumbies	16	7	0	9	393	422	−29	56	52	2	4	34	
11	Stormers	16	6	0	10	390	423	−33	46	56	0	5	29	
12	Bulls	16	6	0	10	441	502	−61	59	66	2	3	29	
13	Reds	16	6	0	10	389	501	−112	49	66	1	3	28	
14	Blues	16	4	0	12	378	509	−131	50	66	2	4	22	
15	Sunwolves	16	3	0	13	404	664	−260	48	99	0	2	14	

Source: Super Rugby

=== Round-by-round ===
The table below shows each team's progression throughout the season. For each round, their cumulative points total is shown with the overall log position in brackets:

Team Progression – Australian Conference
Team	R1	R2	R3	R4	R5	R6	R7	R8	R9	R10	R11	R12	R13	R14	R15	R16	R17	R18	R19	QF	SF	Final
Waratahs	—N/a	4 (7th)	6 (5th)	6 (8th)	10 (7th)	10 (9th)	14 (6th)	19 (6th)	24 (3rd)	24 (3rd)	24 (3rd)	25 (3rd)	26 (3rd)	31 (3rd)	31 (3rd)	35 (3rd)	39 (3rd)	44 (2nd)	44 (3rd)	Won	Lost	—N/a
Rebels	—N/a	5 (2nd)	10 (2nd)	15 (1st)	15 (2nd)	20 (1st)	20 (1st)	20 (3rd)	21 (6th)	21 (7th)	21 (7th)	21 (10th)	25 (7th)	25 (9th)	30 (8th)	34 (8th)	35 (8th)	35 (8th)	36 (9th)	—N/a	—N/a	—N/a
Brumbies	—N/a	4 (5th)	4 (8th)	4 (13th)	8 (11th)	8 (11th)	9 (11th)	14 (8th)	14 (9th)	15 (11th)	15 (13th)	15 (14th)	16 (14th)	16 (14th)	20 (12th)	25 (11th)	29 (10th)	30 (10th)	34 (10th)	—N/a	—N/a	—N/a
Reds	—N/a	0 (14th)	4 (11th)	8 (6th)	12 (4th)	13 (7th)	13 (8th)	13 (10th)	13 (12th)	13 (13th)	17 (12th)	17 (12th)	17 (12th)	18 (12th)	19 (13th)	19 (13th)	19 (14th)	23 (13th)	28 (13th)	—N/a	—N/a	—N/a
Sunwolves	—N/a	1 (12th)	1 (14th)	1 (15th)	2 (15th)	2 (15th)	2 (15th)	2 (15th)	2 (15th)	2 (15th)	2 (15th)	2 (15th)	6 (15th)	10 (15th)	10 (15th)	10 (15th)	14 (15th)	14 (15th)	14 (15th)	—N/a	—N/a	—N/a
Team Progression – New Zealand Conference
Team	R1	R2	R3	R4	R5	R6	R7	R8	R9	R10	R11	R12	R13	R14	R15	R16	R17	R18	R19	QF	SF	Final
Crusaders	—N/a	5 (3rd)	10 (3rd)	10 (4th)	10 (6th)	15 (3rd)	19 (4th)	24 (2nd)	24 (4th)	29 (2nd)	33 (1st)	38 (1st)	42 (1st)	46 (1st)	50 (1st)	54 (1st)	54 (1st)	58 (1st)	63 (1st)	Won	Won	Won
Hurricanes	—N/a	1 (9th)	6 (4th)	10 (3rd)	10 (5th)	14 (4th)	19 (3rd)	23 (4th)	27 (1st)	27 (4th)	32 (4th)	36 (4th)	41 (4th)	45 (4th)	45 (4th)	45 (4th)	45 (4th)	50 (4th)	51 (4th)	Won	Lost	—N/a
Chiefs	—N/a	0 (13th)	4 (10th)	4 (12th)	8 (10th)	13 (5th)	17 (5th)	21 (5th)	21 (5th)	26 (5th)	26 (6th)	27 (6th)	31 (6th)	32 (5th)	37 (5th)	37 (6th)	41 (5th)	45 (5th)	49 (5th)	Lost	—N/a	—N/a
Highlanders	—N/a	4 (6th)	4 (7th)	9 (5th)	13 (3rd)	13 (6th)	14 (7th)	14 (7th)	19 (7th)	24 (6th)	28 (5th)	28 (5th)	32 (5th)	32 (6th)	36 (6th)	40 (5th)	40 (6th)	40 (6th)	44 (6th)	Lost	—N/a	—N/a
Blues	—N/a	1 (10th)	2 (13th)	6 (9th)	6 (12th)	6 (13th)	6 (14th)	7 (14th)	12 (14th)	12 (14th)	13 (14th)	17 (13th)	17 (13th)	17 (13th)	17 (14th)	17 (14th)	22 (13th)	22 (14th)	22 (14th)	—N/a	—N/a	—N/a
Team Progression – South African Conference
Team	R1	R2	R3	R4	R5	R6	R7	R8	R9	R10	R11	R12	R13	R14	R15	R16	R17	R18	R19	QF	SF	Final
Lions	4 (4th)	9 (1st)	14 (1st)	15 (2nd)	19 (1st)	19 (2nd)	20 (2nd)	25 (1st)	25 (2nd)	30 (1st)	31 (2nd)	31 (2nd)	31 (2nd)	36 (2nd)	40 (2nd)	40 (2nd)	41 (2nd)	41 (3rd)	46 (2nd)	Won	Won	Lost
Jaguares	0 (15th)	0 (15th)	0 (15th)	4 (14th)	4 (14th)	8 (12th)	8 (13th)	8 (13th)	12 (13th)	16 (10th)	20 (8th)	24 (7th)	24 (8th)	29 (7th)	34 (7th)	34 (7th)	38 (7th)	38 (7th)	38 (7th)	Lost	—N/a	—N/a
Sharks	1 (5th)	1 (11th)	3 (12th)	8 (7th)	9 (9th)	9 (10th)	13 (10th)	14 (9th)	14 (10th)	18 (9th)	18 (11th)	23 (8th)	24 (10th)	28 (8th)	28 (9th)	28 (9th)	32 (9th)	32 (9th)	36 (8th)	Lost	—N/a	—N/a
Stormers	4 (1st)	5 (4th)	5 (6th)	5 (11th)	9 (8th)	13 (8th)	13 (9th)	13 (11th)	13 (11th)	14 (12th)	18 (10th)	22 (9th)	23 (11th)	24 (11th)	25 (10th)	25 (10th)	25 (12th)	29 (11th)	29 (11th)	—N/a	—N/a	—N/a
Bulls	0 (6th)	4 (8th)	4 (9th)	5 (10th)	5 (13th)	5 (14th)	9 (12th)	9 (12th)	14 (8th)	19 (8th)	20 (9th)	20 (11th)	24 (9th)	24 (10th)	24 (11th)	24 (12th)	25 (11th)	29 (12th)	29 (12th)	—N/a	—N/a	—N/a
Key:	win	draw	loss	bye																		

== Matches ==
The fixtures for the 2018 Super Rugby competition were released on 21 September 2017. The following matches were played during the regular season:

Home \ Away	BLU	BRU	BUL	CHI	CRU	HIG	HUR	JAG	LIO	REB	RED	SHA	STO	SUN	WAR
Blues	—	—	—	21–27	24–32	16–34	15–36	13–20	—	10–20	39–16	40–63	—	—	—
Brumbies	—	—	—	—	8–21	—	24–12	20–25	—	24–27	45–21	24–17	—	41–31	17–24
Bulls	—	28–38	—	—	—	28–29	21–19	43–34	35–49	28–10	—	39–33	33–23	—	—
Chiefs	21–19	24–19	41–28	—	20–34	27–22	28–24	19–23	—	—	—	—	—	—	39–27
Crusaders	54–17	—	33–14	45–23	—	45–22	24–13	—	—	—	—	—	45–28	33–11	31–29
Highlanders	41–34	43–17	—	22–45	25–17	—	30–14	—	39–27	43–37	—	—	33–15	—	—
Hurricanes	42–24	—	—	25–13	29–19	29–12	—	—	28–19	—	38–34	38–37	—	43–15	—
Jaguares	—	—	54–24	—	14–40	—	9–34	—	49–35	—	7–18	29–13	25–14	—	38–28
Lions	35–38	42–24	38–12	—	8–14	—	—	47–27	—	—	—	26–19	52–31	40–38	—
Rebels	—	33–10	—	—	10–55	—	19–50	22–25	—	—	45–19	46–14	—	40–13	26–31
Reds	—	18–10	20–14	12–36	—	15–18	—	—	27–22	37–23	—	—	—	48–27	41–52
Sharks	—	—	10–40	28–24	—	38–12	—	20–10	31–24	—	—	—	24–17	50–22	24–24
Stormers	37–20	—	29–17	9–15	—	—	—	28–20	23–26	34–18	25–19	27–16	—	—	—
Sunwolves	10–24	25–32	42–37	10–61	—	—	—	—	—	17–37	63–28	—	26–23	—	29–50
Waratahs	21–24	31–40	—	—	—	41–12	—	—	0–29	51–27	37–16	—	34–27	77–25	—

Updated to match(es) played on 3 June 2018. Source: http://images.supersport.co.za/content/Vodacom%20Super%20Rugby%202018%20Draw.pdf
Legend: Blue = home team win; Yellow = draw; Red = away team win.

== Finals ==
Quarter-finals
21 July – Christchurch
Crusaders	40
Sharks	10
20 July – Wellington
Hurricanes	32
Chiefs	31
21 July – Johannesburg
Lions	40
Jaguares	23
21 July – Sydney
Waratahs	30
Highlanders	23

Semi-finals
28 July – Christchurch
Crusaders	30
Hurricanes	12
28 July – Johannesburg
Lions	44
Waratahs	26

Final
4 August – Christchurch
Crusaders	37
Lions	18

=== Quarter-finals ===
20 July 2018
19:35

Hurricanes	32–31	Chiefs
Try: Julian Savea 1'; TJ Perenara 33', 62'; Ben Lam 69'; Con: Beauden Barrett 2', 33'; Jordie Barrett 70'; Pen: Beauden Barrett 11', 55'; Cards: Vaea Fifita (yellow card) 80'	Report; Scoreboard	Try: Brad Weber 7'; Anton Lienert-Brown 51'; Damian McKenzie 79'; Lachlan Boshier 80'; Con: Damian McKenzie 8', 52', 79'; Charlie Ngatai 80'; Pen: Damian McKenzie 22'

Westpac Stadium, Wellington
Attendance: 16,402
Referee: Glen Jackson

21 July 2018
19:35

Crusaders	40–10	Sharks
Try: Bryn Hall 9'; David Havili 12'; Matt Todd 42'; Braydon Ennor 67'; Pete Samu 72'; Con: Richie Mo'unga 43', 68', 73'; Pen: Richie Mo'unga 7', 40', 57'	Report; Scoreboard	Try: Kobus van Wyk 26'; Con: Robert du Preez 27'; Pen: Robert du Preez 48'

AMI Stadium, Christchurch
Referee: Mike Fraser

21 July 2018
20:05

Waratahs	30–23	Highlanders
Try: Bernard Foley 54', 61'; Israel Folau 56'; Con: Bernard Foley 54', 57', 62'; Pen: Bernard Foley 4', 9', 71'; Cards: Paddy Ryan (yellow card) 74'	Report; Scoreboard	Try: Waisake Naholo 11'; Rob Thompson 25'; Con: Lima Sopoaga 12', 26'; Pen: Lima Sopoaga 7', 19', 34'; Cards: Waisake Naholo (yellow card) 52' to 62'

Allianz Stadium, Sydney
Attendance: 12,067
Referee: Angus Gardner

21 July 2018
15:05

Lions	40–23	Jaguares
Try: Ruan Combrinck 8'; Harold Vorster 15'; Malcolm Marx 27'; Andries Coetzee 57'; Con: Elton Jantjies 9', 16', 28', 58'; Pen: Elton Jantjies 26', 44', 76'; Drop: Elton Jantjies 64'	Report; Scoreboard	Try: Bautista Delguy 42'; Pablo Matera 48'; Con: Nicolás Sánchez 43', 49'; Pen: Nicolás Sánchez 4', 6', 37'

Emirates Airline Park, Johannesburg
Referee: Jaco Peyper

=== Semi-finals ===
28 July 2018
19:35

Crusaders	30–12	Hurricanes
Try: Richie Mo'unga 15'; George Bridge 28'; David Havili 44'; Braydon Ennor 69'; Con: Richie Mo'unga 16', 45'; Pen: Richie Mo'unga 36', 39'	Report; Scoreboard	Try: Julian Savea 19'; Ben Lam 80'; Con: Beauden Barrett 19'

AMI Stadium, Christchurch
Referee: Jaco Peyper

28 July 2018
15:05

Lions	44–26	Waratahs
Try: Kwagga Smith 21', 63'; Aphiwe Dyantyi 26'; Malcolm Marx 35', 58'; Courtnall Skosan 79'; Con: Elton Jantjies 28', 37', 64', 80'; Pen: Elton Jantjies 55', 74'	Report; Scoreboard	Try: Ned Hanigan 4'; Israel Folau 8'; Tom Robertson 39'; Jake Gordon 76'; Con: Bernard Foley 6', 10', 76'; Cards: Damien Fitzpatrick (yellow card) 57' to 67'

Emirates Airline Park, Johannesburg
Referee: Glen Jackson

=== Final ===
4 August 2018
19:35

Crusaders	37–18	Lions
Try: Seta Tamanivalu 19'; David Havili 34'; Mitchell Drummond 62'; Scott Barrett 70'; Con: Richie Mo'unga 20', 36', 63', 71'; Pen: Richie Mo'unga 16', 33', 43'; Cards: Ryan Crotty (yellow card) 67' to 77'	Report; Scoreboard	Try: Cyle Brink 53'; Malcolm Marx 68'; Con: Elton Jantjies 54'; Pen: Elton Jantjies 13', 39'

AMI Stadium, Christchurch
Attendance: 20 000
Referee: Angus Gardner

== Players ==
=== Squads ===
The following 2018 Super Rugby squads have been named:

Blues squad
Forwards	Leni Apisai • Gerard Cowley-Tuioti • Lyndon Dunshea • Blake Gibson • Josh Goodhue • Sione Havili • Alex Hodgman • Akira Ioane • Jerome Kaino • Antonio Kiri Kiri • Sione Mafileo • Pauliasi Manu • Matiaha Martin • Matt Moulds • Ben Nee-Nee • Dalton Papalii • James Parsons • Jacob Pierce • Glenn Preston • Kara Pryor • Scott Scrafton • Mike Tamoaieta • Murphy Taramai • Patrick Tuipulotu • Jimmy Tupou • Ofa Tu'ungafasi • Ross Wright • Did not play: • Isaac Salmon
Backs	Caleb Clarke • Michael Collins • Matt Duffie • TJ Faiane • Bryn Gatland • Terrence Hepetema • Jordan Hyland • Rieko Ioane • Daniel Kirkpatrick • Orbyn Leger • Tumua Manu • George Moala • Melani Nanai • Sam Nock • Stephen Perofeta • Augustine Pulu • Jonathan Ruru • Jordan Trainor • Tamati Tua • Sonny Bill Williams • Did not play: • Otere Black • Matthew Johnson
Coach	Tana Umaga

Brumbies squad
Forwards	Robbie Abel • Allan Alaalatoa • Ben Alexander • Richie Arnold • Rory Arnold • Sam Carter • Tom Cusack • Blake Enever • Mees Erasmus • Folau Fainga'a • Lolo Fakaosilea • Leslie Leulua’iali’i-Makin • Joshua Mann-Rea • Nic Mayhew • Lachlan McCaffrey • Connal McInerney • Isi Naisarani • Michael Oakman-Hunt • David Pocock • Scott Sio • Faalelei Sione • Darcy Swain • Rob Valetini • Did not play: • Ben Hyne
Backs	Tom Banks • James Dargaville • Kyle Godwin • Wharenui Hawera • Jordan Jackson-Hope • Tevita Kuridrani • Christian Lealiifano • Matt Lucas • Andy Muirhead • Chance Peni • Joe Powell • Andrew Smith • Henry Speight • Lausii Taliauli • James Verity-Amm • Did not play: • Mack Hansen • Ryan Lonergan
Coach	Dan McKellar

Bulls squad
Forwards	Shaun Adendorff • Tim Agaba • Matthys Basson • Thembelani Bholi • Lood de Jager • Nick de Jager • Johan Grobbelaar • Lizo Gqoboka • Jason Jenkins • Jannes Kirsten • Hanro Liebenberg • Edgar Marutlulle • Nqoba Mxoli • Ruan Nortjé • Trevor Nyakane • Pierre Schoeman • Roelof Smit • Mornay Smith • RG Snyman • Hendré Stassen • Adriaan Strauss • Ruben van Heerden • Conraad van Vuuren • Marco van Staden • Frans van Wyk • Jaco Visagie • Did not play: • Aston Fortuin • Simphiwe Matanzima • Ruan Steenkamp
Backs	Marnitz Boshoff • Francois Brummer • Warrick Gelant • Boeta Hamman • Travis Ismaiel • JT Jackson • Johnny Kôtze • Jesse Kriel • Manie Libbok • Duncan Matthews • Burger Odendaal • Embrose Papier • Handré Pollard • Divan Rossouw • Dries Swanepoel • Jamba Ulengo • Ivan van Zyl • André Warner • Did not play: • Jade Stighling
Coach	John Mitchell

Chiefs squad
Forwards	Michael Allardice • Tyler Ardron • Dominic Bird • Lachlan Boshier • Mitchell Brown • Sam Cane • Nathan Harris • Luke Jacobson • Mitchell Karpik • Sefo Kautai • Nepo Laulala • Matt Matich • Liam Messam • Atunaisa Moli • Jesse Parete • Liam Polwart • Sam Prattley • Brodie Retallick • Aidan Ross • Taleni Seu • Pita Gus Sowakula • Angus Ta'avao • Samisoni Taukei'aho • Jeff Thwaites • Karl Tu’inukuafe • Did not play: • Mitchell Graham • Kane Hames • Fin Hoeata
Backs	Solomon Alaimalo • Johnny Fa'auli • Tiaan Falcon • Luteru Laulala • Anton Lienert-Brown • Damian McKenzie • Marty McKenzie • Alex Nankivell • Charlie Ngatai • Declan O'Donnell • Toni Pulu • Shaun Stevenson • Baylin Sullivan • Te Toiroa Tahuriorangi • Jonathan Taumateine • Sean Wainui • Brad Weber • Did not play: • Levi Aumua • Sam McNicol • Tim Nanai-Williams • Regan Verney
Coach	Colin Cooper

Crusaders squad
Forwards	Michael Alaalatoa • Harry Allan • Sam Anderson-Heather • Scott Barrett • Heiden Bedwell-Curtis • Ethan Blackadder • Donald Brighouse • Wyatt Crockett • Mitchell Dunshea • Owen Franks • Ben Funnell • Billy Harmon • Oliver Jager • Chris King • Andrew Makalio • Joe Moody • Tim Perry • Kieran Read • Luke Romano • Pete Samu • Tom Sanders • Sebastian Siataga • Quinten Strange • Jordan Taufua • Codie Taylor • Matt Todd • Sam Whitelock
Backs	Tim Bateman • George Bridge • Brett Cameron • Ryan Crotty • Israel Dagg • Mike Delany • Mitchell Drummond • Braydon Ennor • Tima Fainga'anuku • Jack Goodhue • Bryn Hall • David Havili • Mitchell Hunt • Jone Macilai-Tori • Manasa Mataele • Richie Mo'unga • Jack Stratton • Seta Tamanivalu • Did not play: • Will Jordan
Coach	Scott Robertson

Highlanders squad
Forwards	Alex Ainley • Liam Coltman • Josh Dickson • Ash Dixon • Elliot Dixon • Tom Franklin • Shannon Frizell • Jackson Hemopo • Dillon Hunt • James Lentjes • Daniel Lienert-Brown • Tyrel Lomax • Marino Mikaele-Tu’u • Guy Millar • Pari Pari Parkinson • Greg Pleasants-Tate • Dan Pryor • Aki Seiuli • Liam Squire • Siate Tokolahi • Kalolo Tuiloma • Luke Whitelock
Backs	Richard Buckman • Matt Faddes • Kayne Hammington • Josh Ioane • Tevita Li • Josh McKay • Tevita Nabura • Waisake Naholo • Josh Renton • Aaron Smith • Ben Smith • Fletcher Smith • Lima Sopoaga • Rob Thompson • Sio Tomkinson • Thomas Umaga-Jensen • Teihorangi Walden
Coach	Aaron Mauger

Hurricanes squad
Forwards	Fraser Armstrong • Asafo Aumua • Murray Douglas • Gareth Evans • Chris Eves • Michael Fatialofa • Alex Fidow • Vaea Fifita • Sam Henwood • Sam Lousi • Ben May • James O'Reilly • Reed Prinsep • Marcel Renata • Ricky Riccitelli • Ardie Savea • Brad Shields • Toby Smith • Blade Thomson • Jeffery Toomaga-Allen • Nathan Vella • Isaia Walker-Leawere • Did not play: • James Blackwell • Dane Coles
Backs	Vince Aso • Beauden Barrett • Jordie Barrett • Jamie Booth • Finlay Christie • Jackson Garden-Bachop • Wes Goosen • Richard Judd • Ben Lam • Ngani Laumape • Jonah Lowe • Nehe Milner-Skudder • TJ Perenara • Matt Proctor • Julian Savea • Peter Umaga-Jensen • Ihaia West • Did not play: • TJ Va'a
Coach	Chris Boyd

Jaguares squad
Forwards	Matías Alemanno • Felipe Arregui • Agustín Creevy • Javier Díaz • Diego Fortuny • Santiago García Botta • Marcos Kremer • Tomás Lavanini • Juan Manuel Leguizamón • Tomás Lezana • Pablo Matera • Santiago Medrano • Julián Montoya • Javier Ortega Desio • Guido Petti • Leonardo Senatore • Nahuel Tetaz Chaparro • Juan Pablo Zeiss • Did not play: • Franco Brarda • Rodrigo Bruni • Nicolás Leiva • Benjamín Macome • Santiago Montagner • Enrique Pieretto
Backs	Gonzalo Bertranou • Emiliano Boffelli • Sebastián Cancelliere • Jerónimo de la Fuente • Bautista Delguy • Joaquín Díaz Bonilla • Bautista Ezcurra • Felipe Ezcurra • Santiago González Iglesias • Juan Martín Hernández • Martín Landajo • Juan Cruz Mallia • Matías Moroni • Ramiro Moyano • Matías Orlando • Nicolás Sánchez • Joaquín Tuculet • Did not play: • Santiago Álvarez • Tomás Cubelli
Coach	Mario Ledesma

Lions squad
Forwards	Jacobie Adriaanse • Cyle Brink • Robbie Coetzee • Hacjivah Dayimani • Ruan Dreyer • Lourens Erasmus • Andries Ferreira • Corné Fourie • Johannes Jonker • Robert Kruger • Malcolm Marx • Len Massyn • Franco Mostert • Marvin Orie • Marnus Schoeman • Sti Sithole • Dylan Smith • Kwagga Smith • Jacques van Rooyen • Warren Whiteley • Did not play: • Willie Engelbrecht • Rhyno Herbst • Jaco Kriel
Backs	Andries Coetzee • Ruan Combrinck • Ross Cronjé • Ashlon Davids • Aphiwe Dyantyi • Nic Groom • Rohan Janse van Rensburg • Marco Jansen van Vuren • Elton Jantjies • Sylvian Mahuza • Lionel Mapoe • Howard Mnisi • Shaun Reynolds • Courtnall Skosan • Dillon Smit • Madosh Tambwe • Harold Vorster • Did not play: • Christiaan Meyer
Coach	Swys de Bruin

Rebels squad
Forwards	Jermaine Ainsley • Nathan Charles • Adam Coleman • Angus Cottrell • Ben Daley • Pone Fa'amausili • Colby Fainga'a • Tetera Faulkner • Richard Hardwick • Ross Haylett-Petty • Sam Jeffries • Amanaki Mafi • Sama Malolo • Geoff Parling • Matt Philip • Anaru Rangi • Fereti Sa'aga • Sam Talakai • Lopeti Timani • Jordan Uelese • Mahe Vailanu • Did not play: • Rob Leota • Tom Moloney • Laurie Weeks
Backs	Tayler Adams • Jack Debreczeni • Tom English • Will Genia • Harrison Goddard • Dane Haylett-Petty • Reece Hodge • Marika Koroibete • Jack Maddocks • Bill Meakes • Sefa Naivalu • Michael Ruru • Semisi Tupou • Did not play: • David Horwitz • Henry Hutchison • Jack McGregor • Sione Tuipulotu
Coach	David Wessels

Reds squad
Forwards	Angus Blyth • Kane Douglas • Sef Fa'agase • Scott Higginbotham • Harry Hockings • Harry Hoopert • Adam Korczyk • Alex Mafi • Brandon Paenga-Amosa • Andrew Ready • Izack Rodda • Angus Scott-Young • James Slipper • George Smith • JP Smith • Ruan Smith • Caleb Timu • Lukhan Tui • Taniela Tupou • Liam Wright • Did not play: • Michael Gunn • Reece Hewat • Markus Vanzati
Backs	Filipo Daugunu • Chris Feauai-Sautia • Samu Kerevi • Jono Lance • Ben Lucas • Tate McDermott • Eto Nabuli • Jayden Ngamanu • Duncan Paia'aua • Izaia Perese • Jordan Petaia • Moses Sorovi • Hamish Stewart • Teti Tela • Aidan Toua • James Tuttle • Did not play: • Quade Cooper • Karmichael Hunt • Lachlan Maranta
Coach	Brad Thorn

Sharks squad
Forwards	Hyron Andrews • Ruan Botha • Keegan Daniel • Dan du Preez • Jean-Luc du Preez • Thomas du Toit • Ross Geldenhuys • Gideon Koegelenberg • Stephan Lewies • Mzamo Majola • Franco Marais • John-Hubert Meyer • Tendai Mtawarira • Tera Mtembu • Tyler Paul • Chiliboy Ralepelle • Juan Schoeman • Akker van der Merwe • Philip van der Walt • Jacques Vermeulen • Wian Vosloo • Did not play: • Jean Droste • Khutha Mchunu • Coenie Oosthuizen • Kerron van Vuuren
Backs	Lukhanyo Am • Garth April • Curwin Bosch • Robert du Preez • André Esterhuizen • Marius Louw • Makazole Mapimpi • Lwazi Mvovo • S'busiso Nkosi • Louis Schreuder • Kobus van Wyk • Grant Williams • Cameron Wright • Did not play: • Tristan Blewett • Michael Claassens • Johan Deysel • Rhyno Smith • Jeremy Ward • Courtney Winnaar • Leolin Zas
Coach	Robert du Preez

Stormers squad
Forwards	Juarno Augustus • Nizaam Carr • Jaco Coetzee • Jan de Klerk • Johan du Toit • Pieter-Steph du Toit • Neethling Fouché • JC Janse van Rensburg • Steven Kitshoff • Siya Kolisi • Wilco Louw • Frans Malherbe • Bongi Mbonambi • Salmaan Moerat • Dean Muir • Sikhumbuzo Notshe • Scarra Ntubeni • Carlü Sadie • Ramone Samuels • JD Schickerling • Kobus van Dyk • Chris van Zyl • Cobus Wiese • Did not play: • Stephan de Wit • Eben Etzebeth • Caylib Oosthuizen • Alistair Vermaak • Eduard Zandberg
Backs	Craig Barry • Damian de Allende • Paul de Wet • Jean-Luc du Plessis • Dewaldt Duvenage • JJ Engelbrecht • Herschel Jantjies • Dillyn Leyds • SP Marais • Justin Phillips • Raymond Rhule • Seabelo Senatla • Joshua Stander • Jano Vermaak • EW Viljoen • George Whitehead • Damian Willemse • Did not play: • Daniël du Plessis • Dan Kriel • Sergeal Petersen
Coach	Robbie Fleck

Sunwolves squad
Forwards	Asaeli Ai Valu • Takuma Asahara • Jaba Bregvadze • Willie Britz • Grant Hattingh • Uwe Helu • Kazuki Himeno • Shota Horie • Keita Inagaki • Shintaro Ishihara • Nika Khatiashvili • Koo Ji-won • Lappies Labuschagné • Fetuani Lautaimi • Michael Leitch • Shinya Makabe • Craig Millar • James Moore • Yusuke Niwai • Shunsuke Nunomaki • Ed Quirk • Atsushi Sakate • Yoshitaka Tokunaga • Wimpie van der Walt • Hencus van Wyk • Rahboni Warren-Vosayaco • Alex Woonton • Sam Wykes • Did not play: • Takeshi Hino • Masakatsu Nishikawa
Backs	Jason Emery • Yoshikazu Fujita • Kenki Fukuoka • Kai Ishii • Timothy Lafaele • Lomano Lemeki • Michael Little • Semisi Masirewa • Rikiya Matsuda • Kotaro Matsushima • Yutaka Nagare • Ryoto Nakamura • Ryuji Noguchi • Hayden Parker • Robbie Robinson • Hosea Saumaki • Kaito Shigeno • Yu Tamura • Fumiaki Tanaka • Harumichi Tatekawa • Sione Teaupa • Will Tupou • Keisuke Uchida • Gerhard van den Heever • Akihito Yamada • Did not play: • Daishi Murata
Coach	Tony Brown • Jamie Joseph

Waratahs squad
Forwards	Damien Fitzpatrick • Ned Hanigan • Jed Holloway • Michael Hooper • Harry Johnson-Holmes • Sekope Kepu • Tolu Latu • Ryan McCauley • Will Miller • Nick Palmer • Hugh Roach • Tom Robertson • Paddy Ryan • Rob Simmons • Tom Staniforth • Kalivati Tawake • Shambeckler Vui • Michael Wells • Brad Wilkin • Did not play: • Jack Dempsey • Maclean Jones • Kelly Meafua • Matt Sandell • JP Sauni • Lachlan Swinton • Cody Walker
Backs	Kurtley Beale • Cameron Clark • Lalakai Foketi • Israel Folau • Bernard Foley • Jake Gordon • Bryce Hegarty • Andrew Kellaway • Taqele Naiyaravoro • Alex Newsome • Nick Phipps • Curtis Rona • Mitch Short • Michael Snowden • Did not play: • Nick Duffy • Mack Mason • Irae Simone
Coach	Daryl Gibson

=== Top scorers ===
The top ten try and point scorers during the 2018 Super Rugby season are:

Top ten try scorers
No	Player	Team	Tries
1	Ben Lam	Hurricanes	16
2	George Bridge	Crusaders	15
2	Taqele Naiyaravoro	Waratahs	15
4	Malcolm Marx	Lions	12
5	Israel Folau	Waratahs	11
6	Emiliano Boffelli	Jaguares	10
6	Bautista Delguy	Jaguares	10
6	Rieko Ioane	Blues	10
6	Waisake Naholo	Highlanders	10
10	Tom Banks	Brumbies	9
10	Ngani Laumape	Hurricanes	9
10	Jack Maddocks	Rebels	9

Top ten points scorers
No	Player	Team	Points
1	Bernard Foley	Waratahs	223
2	Robert du Preez	Sharks	215
3	Damian McKenzie	Chiefs	177
4	Elton Jantjies	Lions	173
5	Nicolás Sánchez	Jaguares	161
6	Lima Sopoaga	Highlanders	158
7	Richie Mo'unga	Crusaders	150
8	Handré Pollard	Bulls	144
9	Hayden Parker	Sunwolves	136
10	Beauden Barrett	Hurricanes	122

== Referees ==
The following refereeing panel was appointed by SANZAAR for the 2018 Super Rugby season:

2018 Super Rugby referees
Argentina	Federico Anselmi
Australia	Nic Berry • Angus Gardner • Will Houston
Japan	Shuhei Kubo
New Zealand	Nick Briant • Mike Fraser • Glen Jackson • Jamie Nutbrown • Ben O'Keeffe • Brendon Pickerill • Paul Williams
South Africa	AJ Jacobs • Jaco Peyper • Rasta Rasivhenge • Egon Seconds • Marius van der Westhuizen

== Attendances ==
Team	Main Stadium	Capacity	Total Attendance	Average Attendance	% Capacity
(New Zealand) Blues	Eden Park	50,000	77,200	9,650	19%
(New Zealand) Chiefs	Waikato Stadium	25,800			
(New Zealand) Hurricanes	Westpac Stadium	34,500	136,911	15,212	46%
(New Zealand) Crusaders	Rugby League Park	18,000			
(New Zealand) Highlanders	Forsyth Barr Stadium	30,728			
(Australia) Reds	Suncorp Stadium	52,500	96,810	12,101	23%
(Australia) Brumbies	Canberra Stadium	25,011	67,128	8,391	33%
(Australia) Waratahs	Sydney Football Stadium	44,000	121,603	13,511	32%
(Australia) Melbourne Rebels	AAMI Park	29,500	78,566	9,820	33%
(South Africa) Sharks	ABSA Stadium	52,000			
(South Africa) Bulls	Loftus Versfeld	51,792			
(South Africa) Lions	Ellis Park	62,567			
(South Africa) Stormers	Newlands Stadium	51,900			
(Argentina) Jaguares	José Amalfitani Stadium	49,640			
(Japan) Sunwolves	Prince Chichibu Memorial Stadium	27,188	80,608	10,076	35%
