= List of Blues (Super Rugby) players =

This is a list of rugby union footballers who have played for the Blues in Super Rugby. The list includes any player that has played in a regular season match, semi-final or final for the Blues, ordered by debut date and name. The Blues were a foundation team in the 1996 Super 12 season.

== Players ==
No.	Name	Caps	Tries	C	P	DG	Points	Debut	Last
1	Andrew Blowers	34	13				65	01/03/1996	13/05/2000
2	Robin Brooke	63	5	1			27	01/03/1996	11/05/2001
3	Zinzan Brooke	22	8	1			42	01/03/1996	31/05/1997
4	Olo Brown	33	3				15	01/03/1996	30/05/1998
5	Eroni Clarke	48	14				70	01/03/1996	13/05/2000
6	Greg Cooper	3			3		9	01/03/1996	27/03/1996
7	Craig Dowd	64	8				40	01/03/1996	11/05/2001
8	Sean Fitzpatrick	25	2				10	01/03/1996	31/05/1997
9	Richard Fromont	11	1				5	01/03/1996	04/04/1997
10	Michael Jones	36	7				35	01/03/1996	08/05/1999
11	Jonah Lomu	22	13				65	01/03/1996	22/05/1998
12	Kevin Nepia	6						01/03/1996	07/05/1996
13	Cameron Rackham	3						01/03/1996	02/04/1996
14	Charles Riechelmann	42	3				15	01/03/1996	11/05/2001
15	Waisake Sotutu	4	1				5	01/03/1996	27/03/1996
16	Carlos Spencer	96	25	121	79	3	613	01/03/1996	09/04/2005
17	Lee Stensness	50	8				40	01/03/1996	17/05/2003
18	Ofisa Tonu'u	32	11				55	01/03/1996	30/05/1998
19	Errol Brain	5	1				5	10/03/1996	26/04/1996
20	Jason Chandler	4						10/03/1996	25/05/1996
21	Joeli Vidiri	61	43				215	10/03/1996	21/04/2001
22	Dylan Mika	22	3				15	15/03/1996	05/05/2000
23	Chris Rose	1	1				5	15/03/1996	15/03/1996
24	Michael Scott	9						15/03/1996	21/03/1998
25	James Kerr	4	1				5	27/03/1996	01/05/1996
26	Jarrod Cunningham	3	2	1			12	02/04/1996	01/05/1996
27	Adrian Cashmore	47	13	105	113	1	617	20/04/1996	13/05/2000
28	Johnny Ngauamo	3	2				10	11/05/1996	25/05/1996
29	Mark Carter	31	5				25	01/03/1997	08/05/1999
30	Orcades Crawford	4						01/03/1997	03/05/1997
31	Brian Lima	12	7				35	01/03/1997	02/05/1998
32	Xavier Rush	86	14				70	01/03/1997	13/05/2005
33	Paul Thomson	37	1				5	01/03/1997	05/05/2001
34	Matthew Webber	1						01/03/1997	01/03/1997
35	Norm Berryman	3						15/03/1997	17/05/1997
36	Tony Marsh	1						15/03/1997	15/03/1997
37	Jeremy Stanley	18	3				15	15/03/1997	11/05/2001
38	Andrew Roose	10						31/03/1997	22/05/1998
39	Jim Coe	3						12/04/1997	27/04/1997
40	Leo Lafaiali'i	20	2				10	12/04/1997	05/05/2000
41	Shane Howarth	3						19/04/1997	03/05/1997
42	Craig Innes	30	2				10	28/02/1998	11/05/2001
43	Lee Lidgard	5						28/02/1998	26/04/1998
44	Paul Mitchell	17	3				15	28/02/1998	01/05/1999
45	Jason Spice	6						28/02/1998	26/04/1998
46	Royce Willis	9	2				10	28/02/1998	30/05/1998
47	Api Naevo	5						07/03/1998	26/04/1998
48	Caleb Ralph	6	3				15	14/03/1998	30/05/1998
49	Hayden Taylor	12	3	4	3		32	14/03/1998	11/05/2001
50	Shane McDonald	2						27/03/1998	04/04/1998
51	James Christian	3	1				5	16/05/1998	10/03/2000
52	Jason Barrell	5						27/02/1999	14/05/1999
53	Justin Collins	93	7				35	27/02/1999	25/04/2009
54	Marc Ellis	9	1				5	27/02/1999	14/05/1999
55	Doug Howlett	97	55				275	27/02/1999	12/05/2007
56	Slade McFarland	33	3				15	27/02/1999	10/05/2002
57	Mark Robinson	39	8				40	27/02/1999	03/05/2002
58	Glenn Taylor	23	1				5	27/02/1999	10/05/2002
59	Rua Tipoki	31	6				30	27/02/1999	14/04/2006
60	Tony Coughlan	6						05/03/1999	01/05/1999
61	Troy Flavell	72	14				70	05/03/1999	16/05/2008
62	Steve Devine	70	5				25	20/03/1999	12/05/2007
63	Rico Gear	35	9				45	20/03/1999	08/05/2004
64	Finau Maka	13	1				5	20/03/1999	13/05/2000
65	Keith Lowen	5						03/04/1999	01/05/1999
66	Joe Veitayaki	2						24/04/1999	08/05/1999
67	Tony Monaghan	3						01/05/1999	14/05/1999
68	Samiu Vahafolau	5	1				5	14/05/1999	10/05/2002
69	Nick White	32						14/05/1999	16/05/2008
70	Orene Ai'i	33	6	9	5	2	69	25/02/2000	14/07/2012
71	Davin Heaps	9						25/02/2000	13/05/2000
72	Walter Little	5	1				5	25/02/2000	31/03/2000
73	Keven Mealamu	164	11				55	25/02/2000	12/06/2015
74	Iliesa Tanivula	11	2				10	25/02/2000	13/05/2000
75	Blair Urlich	10	2				10	24/03/2000	03/05/2002
76	Toʻo Vaega	1						24/03/2000	24/03/2000
77	Ben Meyer	11						31/03/2000	29/04/2005
78	David Morgan	2						22/04/2000	13/05/2000
79	Ron Cribb	19	4				20	23/02/2001	01/03/2003
80	Mils Muliaina	49	16	1			82	23/02/2001	06/05/2005
81	Craig Newby	7						23/02/2001	05/05/2001
82	Matua Parkinson	16	1				5	23/02/2001	03/05/2002
83	Tevita Taumoepeau	10						23/02/2001	11/05/2001
84	Justin Wilson	6	1				5	23/02/2001	05/05/2001
85	James Arlidge	13	1	12	26		107	13/04/2001	10/05/2002
86	Jared Going	1						28/04/2001	28/04/2001
87	Amasio Valence	1						11/05/2001	11/05/2001
88	Christian Califano	5						22/02/2002	06/04/2002
89	Rupeni Caucaunibuca	14	15				75	22/02/2002	26/03/2004
90	Mark Mayerhofler	10	1				5	22/02/2002	10/05/2002
91	Kees Meeuws	33	7				35	22/02/2002	08/05/2004
92	Ali Williams	102	2				10	22/02/2002	13/07/2013
93	Derren Witcombe	53	3				15	22/02/2002	12/05/2007
94	Tony Woodcock	137	9				45	22/02/2002	15/05/2015
95	Hayden Reid	2						02/03/2002	09/03/2002
96	Matt Lord	1						09/03/2002	09/03/2002
97	Vula Maimuri	9	1				5	23/03/2002	28/03/2003
98	Jason Shoemark	6	1				5	29/03/2002	12/04/2003
99	Mike Storey	2						19/04/2002	26/04/2002
100	Josh Blackie	7						10/05/2002	25/04/2009
101	Daniel Braid	80	7				35	21/02/2003	14/07/2012
102	David Gibson	33	6				30	21/02/2003	21/04/2007
103	Deacon Manu	9						21/02/2003	24/05/2003
104	Brad Mika	35	2				10	21/02/2003	05/04/2012
105	Joe Rokocoko	96	38				190	21/02/2003	02/07/2011
106	Sam Tuitupou	38	8				40	21/02/2003	27/04/2007
107	Angus Macdonald	44	1				5	08/03/2003	12/05/2007
108	Shannon Paku	2						04/04/2003	02/05/2003
109	Mose Tuiali'i	3						12/04/2003	17/05/2003
110	John Afoa	101	3				15	21/02/2004	02/07/2011
111	Greg Rawlinson	39	1				5	21/02/2004	12/05/2007
112	Greg Feek	2						27/02/2004	05/03/2004
113	Ben Atiga	45	6	6	11		75	05/03/2004	16/05/2008
114	Jerome Kaino	139	14				70	13/03/2004	14/07/2018
115	Tasesa Lavea	23	3	3	3		30	13/03/2004	25/04/2009
116	Brent Thompson	1						13/03/2004	13/03/2004
117	Bryce Williams	5						13/03/2004	16/04/2004
118	Nathan Kemp	2						09/04/2004	24/04/2004
119	Billy Fulton	4	1				5	16/04/2004	08/05/2004
120	Luke McAlister	51	6	68	74	1	391	24/04/2004	02/07/2011
121	Craig McGrath	4						24/04/2004	06/05/2005
122	Taufaʻao Filise	4						25/02/2005	29/04/2005
123	Isa Nacewa	44	13	24	31		206	25/02/2005	16/05/2008
124	Saimone Taumoepeau	25	1				5	25/02/2005	10/03/2007
125	Nick Williams	36	4				20	25/02/2005	16/05/2008
126	Chresten Davis	1						16/04/2005	16/04/2005
127	Roger Dustow	1						16/04/2005	16/04/2005
128	John Senio	15	1				5	06/05/2005	13/05/2006
129	Tamati Ellison	1						13/05/2005	13/05/2005
130	Rudi Wulf	50	20				100	13/05/2005	02/06/2012
131	Kurtis Haiu	53	5				25	10/02/2006	16/04/2011
132	Anthony Tuitavake	45	16				80	17/02/2006	01/05/2010
133	Viliame Waqaseduadua	8	1				5	17/02/2006	22/04/2006
134	Tim Dow	3						04/03/2006	14/04/2006
135	Junior Poluleuligaga	9	1				5	04/03/2006	13/05/2006
136	Brent Ward	10	2				10	04/03/2006	13/05/2006
137	Anthony Boric	73	3				15	24/03/2006	13/07/2013
138	Regan Tamihere	1						24/03/2006	24/03/2006
139	Onosai Tololima-Auva'a	18	1				5	31/03/2006	27/03/2009
140	George Pisi	17						13/05/2006	15/05/2010
141	Chris Heard	4						02/02/2007	23/03/2007
142	Isaia Toeava	61	18	3			96	02/02/2007	02/03/2012
143	Sam Biddles	1						02/03/2007	02/03/2007
144	David Holwell	6	1	5	3		24	10/03/2007	12/05/2007
145	Taniela Moa	27	5				25	10/03/2007	27/03/2010
146	Nick Evans	12	4	29	23	1	150	16/02/2008	16/05/2008
147	Danny Lee	12	2				10	16/02/2008	10/05/2008
148	Tom McCartney	63	2				10	16/02/2008	04/04/2014
149	Benson Stanley	54	9				45	16/02/2008	19/05/2012
150	Bryn Evans	3						23/02/2008	12/04/2008
151	Paul Williams	25	5	1	4		39	22/03/2008	15/05/2010
152	David Smith	5	2				10	12/04/2008	16/05/2008
153	Bronson Murray	1						10/05/2008	10/05/2008
154	Dean Budd	5	1				5	13/02/2009	16/05/2009
155	Jimmy Gopperth	11	4	23	12		102	13/02/2009	16/05/2009
156	Jamie Helleur	9	2				10	13/02/2009	16/05/2009
157	Chris Lowrey	37	6				30	13/02/2009	14/07/2012
158	Rene Ranger	76	28				140	13/02/2009	15/07/2017
159	Peter Saili	72	4				20	13/02/2009	11/07/2014
160	Chris Smylie	27	2				10	13/02/2009	02/07/2011
161	Grayson Hart	7						20/02/2009	16/05/2009
162	Michael Hobbs	24	2	2	6		32	20/02/2009	14/07/2012
163	Tevita Mailau	38	2				10	20/02/2009	14/07/2012
164	Charlie Faumuina	99	7				35	07/03/2009	15/07/2017
165	Lachie Munro	27	7	18	22		137	07/03/2009	07/07/2012
166	Winston Stanley	5						07/03/2009	24/06/2011
167	Jay Williams	7						07/03/2009	16/05/2009
168	Tom Chamberlain	7						01/05/2009	15/05/2010
169	Andrew van der Heijden	4						16/05/2009	14/07/2012
170	Stephen Brett	31	5	32	31	2	188	12/02/2010	02/07/2011
171	Daniel Kirkpatrick	10						12/02/2010	11/05/2018
172	Serge Lilo	11	1				5	12/02/2010	15/05/2010
173	Viliami Maʻafu	13						12/02/2010	15/05/2010
174	Alby Mathewson	47	13				65	12/02/2010	14/07/2012
175	Filo Paulo	26						12/02/2010	26/05/2012
176	Mike Reid	1						10/04/2010	10/04/2010
177	Luke Braid	70	9				45	19/02/2011	02/05/2015
178	Toby Morland	5						19/02/2011	29/04/2011
179	Jared Payne	18	7				35	19/02/2011	02/07/2011
180	Sherwin Stowers	19	1				5	19/02/2011	14/07/2012
181	Mat Luamanu	4						19/03/2011	11/06/2011
182	James King	4						02/04/2011	02/07/2011
183	Pauliasi Manu	33	1				5	16/04/2011	14/07/2018
184	Sean Polwart	6						13/05/2011	11/06/2013
185	David Raikuna	10	1				5	24/02/2012	02/06/2012
186	Piri Weepu	40	2	5	11		53	24/02/2012	28/06/2014
187	Gareth Anscombe	10	2	13	21	1	102	02/03/2012	26/05/2012
188	Angus Taʻavao	81	6				30	02/03/2012	13/06/2025
189	Ma'a Nonu	39	7				35	10/03/2012	15/06/2019
190	Hadleigh Parkes	13	2				10	10/03/2012	14/07/2012
191	Ben Lam	6	1				5	16/03/2012	12/06/2015
192	Francis Saili	42	7				35	16/03/2012	23/05/2015
193	Liaki Moli	25	1				5	23/03/2012	18/04/2014
194	Dan Pryor	1						05/04/2012	05/04/2012
195	George Moala	74	23				115	13/04/2012	07/04/2018
196	James Parsons	115	9				45	20/04/2012	11/07/2020
197	Steve Luatua	74	8				40	11/05/2012	15/07/2017
198	Cameron Goodhue	1						19/05/2012	19/05/2012
199	Charles Piutau	41	8				40	07/07/2012	02/05/2015
200	Albert Nikoro	5			1		3	14/07/2012	31/05/2014
201	Frank Halai	39	14				70	23/02/2013	25/04/2015
202	Chris Noakes	16	1	20	17		96	23/02/2013	18/04/2014
203	Brendon O'Connor	42	1				5	23/02/2013	12/06/2015
204	Culum Retallick	18						23/02/2013	23/05/2015
205	Bryn Hall	30	3				15	01/03/2013	15/07/2016
206	Baden Kerr	13		11	11		55	01/03/2013	13/07/2013
207	Quentin MacDonald	20						01/03/2013	08/07/2016
208	Jackson Willison	22	3				15	01/03/2013	02/05/2014
209	Kane Barrett	4						10/03/2013	13/07/2013
210	Jamison Gibson-Park	30	2				10	10/03/2013	12/06/2015
211	Marty McKenzie	4		1			2	10/03/2013	13/07/2013
212	Waisake Naholo	2	1				5	10/03/2013	01/06/2013
213	Tim Perry	7						10/03/2013	29/06/2013
214	Ronald Raaymakers	2						10/03/2013	26/04/2013
215	Ofa Tuʻungafasi	166	14				70	13/04/2013	13/06/2026
216	Sam Prattley	40	1				5	18/05/2013	02/06/2017
217	Malakai Fekitoa	1						11/06/2013	11/06/2013
218	Tevita Li	31	7				35	11/06/2013	15/07/2016
219	Wayne Ngaluafe	2						11/06/2013	06/07/2013
220	Lolagi Visinia	33	8	1			42	13/07/2013	15/07/2016
221	Tom Donnelly	15	1				5	22/02/2014	11/07/2014
222	Benji Marshall	6	1	1	1		10	22/02/2014	18/04/2014
223	Patrick Tuipulotu	131	21				105	22/02/2014	13/06/2026
224	Simon Hickey	14		20	28		124	28/02/2014	06/06/2015
225	Pita Ahki	28	2				10	08/03/2014	13/06/2026
226	Jordan Manihera	2						15/03/2014	04/04/2014
227	Hayden Triggs	25						22/03/2014	12/06/2015
228	Ihaia West	45	9	63	63		360	02/05/2014	15/07/2017
229	Josh Bekhuis	28						14/02/2015	15/07/2016
230	Jimmy Cowan	14	1				5	14/02/2015	12/06/2015
231	Akira Ioane	119	29				145	14/02/2015	22/06/2024
232	Hamish Northcott	6						14/02/2015	12/06/2015
233	Matt Moulds	31	1				5	21/02/2015	18/05/2019
234	Melani Nanai	64	21				105	27/02/2015	15/06/2019
235	Daniel Bowden	6	1	6	8		41	28/03/2015	02/05/2015
236	Blake Gibson	54	6				30	18/04/2015	19/06/2021
237	Joe Edwards	8						08/05/2015	14/05/2016
238	Greg Pleasants-Tate	1						08/05/2015	08/05/2015
239	William Lloyd	3						15/05/2015	12/06/2015
240	Nic Mayhew	10						23/05/2015	15/07/2016
241	Matt Vaega	5	1				5	23/05/2015	08/07/2016
242	Airi Hunt	1						06/06/2015	06/06/2015
243	Sione Mafileo	55						06/06/2015	02/08/2020
244	Matt McGahan	12	1		1		8	06/06/2015	02/07/2016
245	Chris Vui	2						06/06/2015	12/06/2015
246	Jack Ram	2						12/06/2015	28/05/2016
247	Billy Guyton	24	2				10	26/02/2016	02/06/2017
248	Kara Pryor	23	3				15	26/02/2016	28/04/2018
249	Male Sa'u	11						26/02/2016	15/07/2016
250	Matt Duffie	54	11				55	04/03/2016	02/08/2020
251	Sam Nock	90	6				30	11/03/2016	06/06/2026
252	Rieko Ioane	128	56				280	19/03/2016	13/06/2025
253	Hoani Matenga	9						19/03/2016	02/07/2016
254	Piers Francis	24	1	32	17		120	02/04/2016	02/06/2017
255	Namatahi Waa	3						08/04/2016	02/07/2016
256	Tanerau Latimer	5						16/04/2016	21/05/2016
257	Gerard Cowley-Tuioti	66	5				25	08/07/2016	19/06/2021
258	Scott Scrafton	23	4				20	15/07/2016	15/06/2019
259	Michael Collins	29	5				25	23/02/2017	06/04/2019
260	Hame Faiva	7						23/02/2017	15/07/2017
261	Augustine Pulu	37	9				45	23/02/2017	15/06/2019
262	Murphy Taramai	19	1				5	23/02/2017	14/07/2018
263	Jimmy Tupou	16	1				5	23/02/2017	20/04/2018
264	TJ Faiane	55	6				30	17/03/2017	19/06/2021
265	Sonny Bill Williams	18	1				5	08/04/2017	15/06/2019
266	Bryn Gatland	15	2	10	10		60	15/04/2017	14/07/2018
267	Josh Goodhue	47						15/04/2017	18/06/2022
268	Leighton Price	2						30/04/2017	06/05/2017
269	Alex Hodgman	57						12/05/2017	18/03/2023
270	Declan O'Donnell	2						12/05/2017	02/06/2017
271	Stephen Perofeta	82	14	103	41		399	02/06/2017	13/06/2026
272	Jordan Trainor	2						02/06/2017	31/03/2018
273	Leni Apisai	19						23/02/2018	16/04/2021
274	Antonio Kiri Kiri	3						23/02/2018	17/03/2018
275	Glenn Preston	1						23/02/2018	23/02/2018
276	Jonathan Ruru	46	2				10	23/02/2018	19/06/2021
277	Mike Tamoaieta	10						23/02/2018	05/05/2018
278	Ross Wright	12						10/03/2018	14/07/2018
279	Dalton Papalii	106	23				115	07/04/2018	08/05/2026
280	Jordan Hyland	5	2				10	14/04/2018	14/02/2020
281	Orbyn Leger	7	1				5	14/04/2018	02/06/2018
282	Ben Nee-Nee	8						14/04/2018	14/07/2018
283	Tumua Manu	4	3				15	20/04/2018	02/06/2018
284	Lyndon Dunshea	2						28/04/2018	11/05/2018
285	Caleb Clarke	89	41				195	05/05/2018	13/06/2026
286	Terrence Hepetema	2	1				5	05/05/2018	02/06/2018
287	Matiaha Martin	4						19/05/2018	07/07/2018
288	Sione Havili Talitui	1						02/06/2018	02/06/2018
289	Jacob Pierce	9						29/06/2018	04/06/2021
290	Tamati Tua	3	1				5	14/07/2018	28/05/2022
291	Otere Black	40	4	73	46		304	16/02/2019	19/06/2021
292	Matt Matich	3						16/02/2019	02/03/2019
293	Harry Plummer	89	1	76	30		247	16/02/2019	13/06/2025
294	Tom Robinson	55	9				45	16/02/2019	16/06/2023
295	Karl Tu'inukuafe	43	2				10	16/02/2019	18/06/2022
296	Tanielu Teleʻa	21	4				20	23/02/2019	21/05/2022
297	Levi Aumua	4						09/03/2019	07/06/2019
298	Lua Li	4						09/03/2019	15/06/2019
299	Marcel Renata	81	9				45	09/03/2019	13/06/2026
300	Jed Brown	3						13/04/2019	10/05/2019
301	Ezekiel Lindenmuth	7						10/05/2019	14/06/2020
302	Hoskins Sotutu	91	33				165	25/05/2019	13/06/2026
303	Hisa Sasagi	1						15/06/2019	15/06/2019
304	Kurt Eklund	82	24				120	31/01/2020	16/05/2026
305	Tony Lamborn	9	1				5	31/01/2020	02/08/2020
306	Joe Marchant	7	3				15	31/01/2020	27/06/2020
307	Emoni Narawa	7	1				5	31/01/2020	14/03/2021
308	Ray Niuia	3						31/01/2020	19/06/2021
309	Mark Tele'a	80	41				205	31/01/2020	13/06/2025
310	Aaron Carroll	6						22/02/2020	02/08/2020
311	Luteru Tolai	10						29/02/2020	16/04/2021
312	Joe Walsh	1						14/03/2020	14/03/2020
313	Beauden Barrett	55	13	114	31	2	392	14/06/2020	13/06/2026
314	Finlay Christie	84	17				85	14/06/2020	13/06/2026
315	Adrian Choat	54	1				5	27/02/2021	13/06/2025
316	Nepo Laulala	38	2				10	27/02/2021	16/06/2023
317	James Lay	11						27/02/2021	13/05/2023
318	Sam Darry	49	12				60	14/03/2021	13/06/2026
319	Bryce Heem	42	9				45	21/03/2021	22/06/2024
320	AJ Lam	74	28				140	03/04/2021	13/06/2026
321	Taine Plumtree	6	2				10	25/04/2021	26/03/2023
322	Soane Vikena	25	2				10	25/04/2021	18/05/2024
323	Zarn Sullivan	56	13	10	4	1	100	01/05/2021	06/06/2026
324	Jacob Ratumaitavuki-Kneepkens	13	2				10	22/05/2021	19/05/2023
325	Ricky Riccitelli	51	18				90	26/02/2022	13/06/2025
326	Luke Romano	15	2				10	26/02/2022	18/06/2022
327	Anton Segner	54	4				20	26/02/2022	13/06/2026
328	Roger Tuivasa-Sheck	18	2				10	26/02/2022	02/06/2023
329	Taufa Funaki	42	7				35	11/03/2022	13/06/2026
330	Jordan Lay	27						11/03/2022	13/06/2025
331	James Tucker	23	1				5	11/03/2022	16/06/2023
332	Corey Evans	28	4				20	26/03/2022	30/05/2026
333	Vaiolini Ekuasi	1						29/03/2022	29/03/2022
334	Josh Fusitu'a	40	2				10	29/03/2022	21/02/2026
335	Jock McKenzie	2			1		3	29/03/2022	28/05/2022
336	Cameron Suafoa	31	4				20	29/03/2022	18/04/2025
337	Lisati Milo-Harris	1						23/04/2022	23/04/2022
338	Nigel Ah Wong	1						28/05/2022	28/05/2022
339	Caleb Tangitau	3						08/04/2023	18/05/2024
340	Rob Rush	1						02/06/2023	02/06/2023
341	Josh Beehre	40	4				20	24/02/2024	13/06/2026
342	Cole Forbes	40	9				45	24/02/2024	13/06/2026
343	Laghlan McWhannell	30	2				10	24/02/2024	30/05/2026
344	Lucas Cashmore	2						05/04/2024	20/04/2024
345	James Thompson	3						27/04/2024	14/06/2024
346	PJ Sheck	4	1				5	03/05/2024	12/04/2025
347	Kade Banks	5	2				10	18/05/2024	08/05/2026
348	Mason Tupaea	24	1				5	18/05/2024	13/06/2026
349	Meihana Grindlay	1						18/05/2024	18/05/2024
350	Nathaniel Pole	2						15/02/2025	07/03/2025
351	Che Clark	10						15/02/2025	13/06/2026
352	James Mullan	15	1				5	22/02/2025	30/05/2026
353	Cam Christie	8						01/03/2025	17/05/2025
354	Xavi Taele	21	2	2			14	15/03/2025	13/06/2026
355	Tristyn Cook	3						15/03/2025	11/04/2026
356	Bryn Gordon	1						22/03/2025	22/03/2025
357	Hamdahn Tuipulotu	2						18/04/2025	25/04/2025
358	Torian Barnes	14	3				15	14/02/2026	13/06/2026
359	Bradley Slater	11	4				20	14/02/2026	13/06/2026
360	Cody Vai	10	4				20	14/02/2026	30/05/2026
361	Sam Matenga	9						28/02/2026	08/05/2026
362	Malachi Wrampling	9	3				15	15/03/2026	06/06/2026
363	Payton Spencer	5	3				15	21/03/2026	13/06/2026
364	Jed Melvin	1						28/03/2026	28/03/2026
365	Ben Ake	3	1				5	17/04/2026	02/05/2026
366	Flyn Yates	6						02/05/2026	13/06/2026
367	Terrell Peita	1	1				5	02/05/2026	02/05/2026
368	Eli Oudenryn	3	2				10	30/05/2026	13/06/2026
