= List of 2019–20 Super Rugby transfers (New Zealand) =

This is a list of player movements for Super Rugby teams prior to the end of the 2020 Super Rugby season. Departure and arrivals of all players that were included in a Super Rugby squad for 2019 or 2020 are listed here, regardless of when it occurred. Future-dated transfers are only included if confirmed by the player or his agent, his former team or his new team.

Notes

- 2019 players listed are all players that were named in the initial senior squad, or subsequently included in a 23-man match day squad at any game during the season.
- (did not play) denotes that a player did not play at all during one of the two seasons due to injury or non-selection. These players are included to indicate they were contracted to the team. For the 2020 season, Super Rugby was suspended after 7 rounds of matches due to the COVID-19 pandemic, with regional tournaments taking place there after. Players listed as 'did not play' did not feature in any of the 7 rounds of matches played that season.
- (short-term) denotes that a player wasn't initially contracted, but came in during the season. This could either be a club rugby player coming in as injury cover, or a player whose contract had expired at another team (typically in the northern hemisphere).
- Flags are only shown for players moving to or from another country.
- Players may play in several positions, but are listed in only one.

== Blues ==
Blues transfers 2019–2020
Pos	2019 squad	Out	In	2020 players
PR	Alex Hodgman; Lua Li (short-term); Ezekiel Lindenmuth; Sione Mafileo; Marcel Renata; Hisa Sasagi (short-term); Karl Tu'inukuafe; Ofa Tu'ungafasi	(substituted off) Lua Li (returned to North Harbour); (substituted off) Hisa Sasagi (returned to Otago)	(substituted on) Joe Walsh (from Southland)	Alex Hodgman; Ezekiel Lindenmuth; Sione Mafileo; Marcel Renata; Karl Tu'inukuafe; Ofa Tu'ungafasi; Joe Walsh (short-term)
HK	Leni Apisai; Matt Moulds; James Parsons	(substituted off) Leni Apisai (to (Japan) Sunwolves); (substituted off) Matt Moulds (to (England) Worcester Warriors)	(substituted on) Kurt Eklund (from Bay of Plenty); (substituted on) Ray Niuia (from Highlanders); (substituted on) Luteru Tolai (from North Harbour)	Kurt Eklund; Ray Niuia; James Parsons; Luteru Tolai (short-term)
LK	Gerard Cowley-Tuioti; Josh Goodhue; Jacob Pierce (did not play); Scott Scrafton; Patrick Tuipulotu	(substituted off) Scott Scrafton (to Hurricanes)	(substituted on) Sam Caird (from Northland); (substituted on) Aaron Carroll (from Bay of Plenty)	Sam Caird (short-term, did not play); Aaron Carroll; Gerard Cowley-Tuioti; Josh Goodhue; Jacob Pierce; Patrick Tuipulotu
FL	Jed Brown; Blake Gibson; Matt Matich (short-term); Dalton Papalii; Tom Robinson; Hoskins Sotutu; Jimmy Tupou (did not play)	(substituted off) Jed Brown (to (Japan) Kintetsu Liners); (substituted off) Matt Matich (to (Paraguay) Olimpia Lions); (substituted off) Jimmy Tupou (to (Japan) NTT Communications Shining Arcs)	(substituted on) Tony Lamborn (from (United States) New Orleans Gold); (substituted on) Waimana Riedlinger-Kapa (from Auckland); (substituted on) James Tucker (from Waikato)	Blake Gibson; Tony Lamborn; Dalton Papalii; Waimana Riedlinger-Kapa (did not play); Tom Robinson; Hoskins Sotutu; James Tucker (did not play)
N8	Akira Ioane			Akira Ioane
SH	Sam Nock; Augustine Pulu; Jonathan Ruru	(substituted off) Augustine Pulu (to (Japan) Hino Red Dolphins)	(substituted on) Finlay Christie (from Hurricanes)	Finlay Christie (did not play); Sam Nock; Jonathan Ruru
FH	Otere Black; Stephen Perofeta (did not play); Harry Plummer		(substituted on) Beauden Barrett (from Hurricanes); (substituted on) Jack Heighton (from North Harbour)	Beauden Barrett (did not play); Otere Black; Jack Heighton (did not play); Stephen Perofeta; Harry Plummer
CE	Levi Aumua; TJ Faiane; Rieko Ioane; Ma'a Nonu; Tanielu Tele’a; Sonny Bill Williams	(substituted off) Levi Aumua (to (Japan) Hino Red Dolphins); (substituted off) Ma'a Nonu (to (United States) San Diego Legion); (substituted off) Sonny Bill Williams (to (Canada) Toronto Wolfpack)	(substituted on) Joe Marchant (from (England) Harlequins)	TJ Faiane; Rieko Ioane; Joe Marchant; Tanielu Tele’a (did not play)
WG	Caleb Clarke; Matt Duffie; Melani Nanai	(substituted off) Melani Nanai (to (England) Worcester Warriors)	(substituted on) Jordan Hyland (from Highlanders); (substituted on) Emoni Narawa (from Bay of Plenty); (substituted on) Mark Tele'a (from North Harbour)	Caleb Clarke (did not play); Matt Duffie; Jordan Hyland; Emoni Narawa; Mark Tele'a
FB	Michael Collins; Jordan Trainor (did not play)	(substituted off) Michael Collins (to Highlanders); (substituted off) Jordan Trainor (to Auckland)	(substituted on) Jared Page (from North Harbour)	Jared Page (did not play)
Coach	Leon MacDonald			Leon MacDonald

== Chiefs ==
Chiefs transfers 2019–2020
Pos	2019 squad	Out	In	2020 players
PR	Ryan Coxon (short-term); Kane Hames (did not play); Sefo Kautai; Nepo Laulala; Tevita Mafileo (short-term); Atu Moli; Reuben O'Neill (did not play); Aidan Ross; Angus Ta'avao	(substituted off) Kane Hames (injured); (substituted off) Sefo Kautai (to (Japan) Kobelco Steelers); (substituted off) Tevita Mafileo (to Hurricanes)	(substituted on) Rob Cobb (from Waikato); (substituted on) Ross Geldenhuys (from Hurricanes); (substituted on) Ollie Norris (from Waikato)	Rob Cobb (wider training squad, did not play); Ryan Coxon; Ross Geldenhuys (wider training squad); Nepo Laulala; Atu Moli; Ollie Norris (wider training squad); Reuben O'Neill; Aidan Ross; Angus Ta'avao
HK	Nathan Harris; Liam Polwart; Bradley Slater (short-term); Samisoni Taukei'aho	(substituted off) Nathan Harris (injured); (substituted off) Liam Polwart (retired)	(substituted on) Donald Maka (from Counties Manukau)	Donald Maka; Bradley Slater; Samisoni Taukei'aho
LK	Michael Allardice; Tyler Ardron; Fin Hoeata (did not play); Daymon Leasuasu (short-term); Laghlan McWhannell (did not play); Brodie Retallick	(substituted off) Fin Hoeata (to Taranaki); (substituted off) Daymon Leasuasu (to (Japan) Ricoh Black Rams); (substituted off) Brodie Retallick (to (Japan) Kobelco Steelers)	(substituted on) Naitoa Ah Kuoi (from Wellington); (substituted on) Tupou Vaa'i (from Taranaki)	Naitoa Ah Kuoi; Michael Allardice; Tyler Ardron; Laghlan McWhannell (did not play); Tupou Vaa'i (wider training squad, did not play)
FL	Lachlan Boshier; Sam Cane; Luke Jacobson; Mitch Jacobson (short-term); Mitchell Karpik; Jesse Parete (short-term); Taleni Seu; Pita Gus Sowakula	(substituted off) Mitch Jacobson (to (Japan) Sunwolves); (substituted off) Jesse Parete (to Highlanders); (substituted off) Taleni Seu (to (Japan) Toyota Industries Shuttles)	(substituted on) Dylan Nel (from Otago); (substituted on) James Thompson (from Waikato)	Lachlan Boshier; Sam Cane; Luke Jacobson; Mitchell Karpik; Dylan Nel; Pita Gus Sowakula; James Thompson (wider training squad, did not play)
N8	Mitchell Brown		(substituted on) Adam Thomson (from Otago)	Mitchell Brown; Adam Thomson (wider training squad)
SH	Te Toiroa Tahuriorangi; Jonathan Taumateine; Brad Weber	(substituted off) Jonathan Taumateine (to Hurricanes)	(substituted on) Leroy Carter (from Bay of Plenty); (substituted on) Lisati Milo-Harris (from Taranaki)	Leroy Carter (wider training squad, did not play); Lisati Milo-Harris; Te Toiroa Tahuriorangi; Brad Weber
FH	Jack Debreczeni; Stephen Donald; Tiaan Falcon (did not play); Damian McKenzie	(substituted off) Jack Debreczeni (to (Japan) Hino Red Dolphins); (substituted off) Stephen Donald (to (Japan) NEC Green Rockets)	(substituted on) Aaron Cruden (from (France) Montpellier); (substituted on) Kaleb Trask (from Bay of Plenty)	Aaron Cruden; Tiaan Falcon; Damian McKenzie; Kaleb Trask
CE	Orbyn Leger (short-term); Anton Lienert-Brown; Tumua Manu; Alex Nankivell; Bailyn Sullivan			Orbyn Leger; Anton Lienert-Brown; Tumua Manu; Alex Nankivell; Bailyn Sullivan (did not play)
WG	Solomon Alaimalo; Ataata Moeakiola; Etene Nanai-Seturo; Shaun Stevenson; Sean Wainui	(substituted off) Ataata Moeakiola (to (Japan) Kobelco Steelers)	(substituted on) Kini Naholo (from Taranaki); (substituted on) Quinn Tupaea (from Waikato)	Solomon Alaimalo; Kini Naholo (did not play); Etene Nanai-Seturo (did not play); Shaun Stevenson; Quinn Tupaea; Sean Wainui
FB	Marty McKenzie	(substituted off) Marty McKenzie (to (Wales) Ospreys)	(substituted on) Sam McNicol (returned from injury)	Sam McNicol
Coach	Colin Cooper	(substituted off) Colin Cooper (released)	(substituted on) Warren Gatland (from Wales)	Warren Gatland

== Crusaders ==
Crusaders transfers 2019–2020
Pos	2019 squad	Out	In	2020 players
PR	Michael Alaalatoa; Harry Allan; George Bower (short-term); Owen Franks; Oliver Jager; Joe Moody; Tim Perry; Isi Tu'ungafasi (short-term)	(substituted off) Owen Franks (to (England) Northampton Saints); (substituted off) Tim Perry (retired)		Michael Alaalatoa; Harry Allan (did not play); George Bower; Oliver Jager; Joe Moody; Isi Tu'ungafasi
HK	Ben Funnell; Andrew Makalio; Brodie McAlister (short-term); Codie Taylor	(substituted off) Ben Funnell (to (Japan) Ricoh Black Rams)	(substituted on) Hugh Roach (from (Australia) Rebels)	Andrew Makalio; Brodie McAlister; Hugh Roach (short-term); Codie Taylor
LK	Scott Barrett; Mitchell Dunshea; Luke Romano; Quinten Strange; Sam Whitelock	(substituted off) Sam Whitelock (to (Japan) Panasonic Wild Knights)		Scott Barrett; Mitchell Dunshea; Luke Romano; Quinten Strange (did not play)
FL	Ethan Blackadder; Billy Harmon; Tom Sanders; Jordan Taufua; Matt Todd	(substituted off) Jordan Taufua (to (England) Leicester Tigers); (substituted off) Matt Todd (to (Japan) Toshiba Brave Lupus)	(substituted on) Tom Christie (from Canterbury); (substituted on) Cullen Grace (from Canterbury); (substituted on) Sione Havili (from Tasman); (substituted on) Ethan Roots (from North Harbour)	Ethan Blackadder (did not play); Tom Christie; Cullen Grace; Billy Harmon (did not play); Sione Havili; Ethan Roots; Tom Sanders
N8	Whetu Douglas; Kieran Read	(substituted off) Kieran Read (to (Japan) Toyota Verblitz)		Whetu Douglas
SH	Mitchell Drummond; Ere Enari; Bryn Hall			Mitchell Drummond; Ere Enari; Bryn Hall
FH	Brett Cameron; Mitchell Hunt; Richie Mo'unga	(substituted off) Mitchell Hunt (to Highlanders)	(substituted on) Fergus Burke (from Canterbury)	Fergus Burke; Brett Cameron; Richie Mo'unga
CE	Tim Bateman; Ryan Crotty; Braydon Ennor; Jack Goodhue	(substituted off) Tim Bateman (to (Japan) Toshiba Brave Lupus); (substituted off) Ryan Crotty (to (Japan) Kubota Spears)	(substituted on) Inga Finau (from Canterbury); (substituted on) Dallas McLeod (from Canterbury)	Braydon Ennor; Inga Finau (did not play); Jack Goodhue; Dallas McLeod
WG	George Bridge; Leicester Fainga'anuku; Will Jordan; Manasa Mataele; Ngane Punivai; Sevu Reece (short-term)	(substituted off) Ngane Punivai (to Highlanders)	(substituted on) Fetuli Paea (from Tasman)	George Bridge; Leicester Fainga'anuku; Will Jordan; Manasa Mataele; Fetuli Paea (did not play); Sevu Reece
FB	Israel Dagg (did not play); David Havili	(substituted off) Israel Dagg (retired)		David Havili
Coach	Scott Robertson			Scott Robertson

== Highlanders ==
Highlanders transfers 2019–2020
Pos	2019 squad	Out	In	2020 players
PR	Sef Fa'agase; Josh Iosefa-Scott; Ayden Johnstone; Daniel Lienert-Brown; Tyrel Lomax; Siate Tokolahi	(substituted off) Sef Fa'agase (to (Japan) Canon Eagles); (substituted off) Tyrel Lomax (to Hurricanes)	(substituted on) Ethan de Groot (from Southland); (substituted on) Conán O'Donnell (from (Japan) Sunwolves); (substituted on) Jeff Thwaites (from Bay of Plenty)	Ethan de Groot (did not play); Josh Iosefa-Scott; Ayden Johnstone; Daniel Lienert-Brown; Conán O'Donnell (short-term); Jeff Thwaites; Siate Tokolahi
HK	Liam Coltman; Ash Dixon; Ricky Jackson (short-term); Ray Niuia (did not play)	(substituted off) Ricky Jackson (injured); (substituted off) Ray Niuia (to Blues)	(substituted on) Nathan Vella (from (Japan) Sunwolves)	Liam Coltman; Ash Dixon; Nathan Vella (did not play)
LK	Josh Dickson; Tom Franklin; Jackson Hemopo; Pari Pari Parkinson; Jack Whetton	(substituted off) Tom Franklin (to (Japan) Kobelco Steelers); (substituted off) Jackson Hemopo (to (Japan) Mitsubishi DynaBoars)	(substituted on) Manaaki Selby-Rickit (from Southland); (substituted on) Will Tucker (from Canterbury)	Josh Dickson; Pari Pari Parkinson; Manaaki Selby-Rickit; Will Tucker (short-term, did not play); Jack Whetton
FL	Shannon Frizell; Dillon Hunt; James Lentjes; Luke Whitelock	(substituted off) Luke Whitelock (to (France) Pau)	(substituted on) Teariki Ben-Nicholas (from Wellington); (substituted on) Zane Kapeli (from Bay of Plenty); (substituted on) Slade McDowall (from Otago); (substituted on) Sione Misiloi (from Otago); (substituted on) Jesse Parete (from Chiefs)	Teariki Ben-Nicholas; Shannon Frizell; Dillon Hunt; Zane Kapeli (did not play); James Lentjes; Slade McDowall (short-term, did not play); Sione Misiloi (did not play); Jesse Parete
N8	Elliot Dixon; Marino Mikaele-Tu’u; Liam Squire	(substituted off) Elliot Dixon (to (Japan) Ricoh Black Rams); (substituted off) Liam Squire (to (Japan) NTT DoCoMo Red Hurricanes)		Marino Mikaele-Tu’u
SH	Folau Fakatava; Kayne Hammington; Aaron Smith			Folau Fakatava (did not play); Kayne Hammington; Aaron Smith
FH	Marty Banks; Bryn Gatland; Dan Hollinshead (short-term); Josh Ioane	(substituted off) Marty Banks (to (Japan) NTT DoCoMo Red Hurricanes); (substituted off) Dan Hollinshead (to Bay of Plenty)	(substituted on) Mitchell Hunt (from Crusaders)	Bryn Gatland (did not play); Mitchell Hunt; Josh Ioane
CE	Richard Buckman; Matt Faddes; Rob Thompson; Sio Tomkinson; Thomas Umaga-Jensen; Teihorangi Walden	(substituted off) Richard Buckman (to (Japan) Kobelco Steelers); (substituted off) Matt Faddes (to (Ireland) Ulster)	(substituted on) Scott Gregory (from Northland)	Scott Gregory; Rob Thompson; Sio Tomkinson; Thomas Umaga-Jensen (did not play); Teihorangi Walden
WG	Jordan Hyland (short-term); Tevita Li; Josh McKay; Tevita Nabura (did not play); Waisake Naholo	(substituted off) Jordan Hyland (to Blues); (substituted off) Tevita Li (to (Japan) Suntory Sungoliath); (substituted off) Waisake Naholo (to (England) London Irish)	(substituted on) Tima Fainga'anuku (from Tasman); (substituted on) Jona Nareki (from Otago); (substituted on) Ngane Punivai (from Crusaders)	Tima Fainga'anuku; Josh McKay; Tevita Nabura (did not play); Jona Nareki; Ngane Punivai
FB	Ben Smith	(substituted off) Ben Smith (to (France) Pau)	(substituted on) Michael Collins (from Blues); (substituted on) Chris Kuridrani (from Counties Manukau)	Michael Collins; Chris Kuridrani
Coach	Aaron Mauger			Aaron Mauger

== Hurricanes ==
Hurricanes transfers 2019–2020
Pos	2019 squad	Out	In	2020 players
PR	Fraser Armstrong; Chris Eves; Alex Fidow; Ross Geldenhuys (short-term); Ben May; Xavier Numia (short-term); Toby Smith; Jeffery Toomaga-Allen	(substituted off) Chris Eves (to (Japan) Sunwolves); (substituted off) Ross Geldenhuys (to Chiefs); (substituted off) Toby Smith (retired); (substituted off) Jeffery Toomaga-Allen (to (England) Wasps)	(substituted on) Tyrel Lomax (from Highlanders); (substituted on) Tevita Mafileo (from Chiefs); (substituted on) Pouri Rakete-Stones (from Hawke's Bay)	Fraser Armstrong; Alex Fidow; Tyrel Lomax; Tevita Mafileo (short-term); Ben May; Xavier Numia; Pouri Rakete-Stones
HK	Asafo Aumua; Dane Coles; James O'Reilly (short-term, did not play); Ricky Riccitelli	(substituted off) James O'Reilly (returned to Wellington)		Asafo Aumua; Dane Coles; Ricky Riccitelli
LK	James Blackwell; Geoff Cridge (did not play); Andries Ferreira (short-term, did not play); Kane Le'aupepe (short-term); Sam Lousi (did not play); Liam Mitchell; Isaia Walker-Leawere	(substituted off) Geoff Cridge (to Hawke's Bay); (substituted off) Andries Ferreira (to (South Africa) Bulls); (substituted off) Sam Lousi (to (Wales) Scarlets)	(substituted on) Scott Scrafton (from Blues)	James Blackwell; Kane Le'aupepe (did not play); Liam Mitchell; Scott Scrafton; Isaia Walker-Leawere
FL	Heiden Bedwell-Curtis; Vaea Fifita; Sam Henwood; Du'Plessis Kirifi; Reed Prinsep; Ardie Savea	(substituted off) Heiden Bedwell-Curtis (to (Japan) Mitsubishi DynaBoars); (substituted off) Sam Henwood (to (Japan) NEC Green Rockets)	(substituted on) Devan Flanders (from Hawke's Bay); (substituted on) Murphy Taramai (from North Harbour)	Vaea Fifita; Devan Flanders; Du'Plessis Kirifi; Reed Prinsep; Ardie Savea (did not play); Murphy Taramai (did not play)
N8	Gareth Evans			Gareth Evans
SH	Finlay Christie; Richard Judd; TJ Perenara	(substituted off) Finlay Christie (to Blues); (substituted off) Richard Judd (to (Japan) Suntory Sungoliath)	(substituted on) Jamie Booth (from (Japan) Sunwolves); (substituted on) Jonathan Taumateine (from Chiefs)	Jamie Booth; TJ Perenara; Jonathan Taumateine
FH	Beauden Barrett; Jackson Garden-Bachop; James Marshall; Fletcher Smith	(substituted off) Beauden Barrett (to Blues)		Jackson Garden-Bachop; James Marshall; Fletcher Smith
CE	Ngani Laumape; Billy Proctor; Matt Proctor; Danny Toala (short-term); Peter Umaga-Jensen (short-term)	(substituted off) Matt Proctor (to (England) Northampton Saints)		Ngani Laumape; Billy Proctor; Danny Toala (did not play); Peter Umaga-Jensen
WG	Vince Aso; Wes Goosen; Ben Lam; Jonah Lowe; Salesi Rayasi	(substituted off) Salesi Rayasi (to New Zealand Sevens)	(substituted on) Kobus van Wyk (from (South Africa) Sharks)	Vince Aso; Wes Goosen; Ben Lam; Jonah Lowe (did not play); Kobus van Wyk
FB	Jordie Barrett; Nehe Milner-Skudder (did not play); Chase Tiatia (short-term)	(substituted off) Nehe Milner-Skudder (to (France) Toulon)		Jordie Barrett; Chase Tiatia
Coach	John Plumtree	(substituted off) John Plumtree (to New Zealand (assistant))	(substituted on) Jason Holland (from assistant coach)	Jason Holland

== See also ==
- List of 2019–20 Premiership Rugby transfers
- List of 2019–20 Pro14 transfers
- List of 2019–20 Top 14 transfers
- List of 2019–20 RFU Championship transfers
- List of 2019–20 Major League Rugby transfers
- SANZAAR
- Super Rugby franchise areas
