= Mike Reid (rugby union) =

New Zealand rugby union player (born 1985)

- Full name: Michael Noy Reid
- Born: 22 October 1985 (age 41)
- Height: 189 cm (6 ft 2 in)
- Weight: 116 kg (256 lb)
- School: Rosmini College

Rugby union career
- Position: Prop
Provincial / State sides
Years	Team	Apps	(Points)
2006–11	North Harbour	48	(0)
Super Rugby
Years	Team	Apps	(Points)
2010	Blues	1	(0)

Michael Noy Reid (born 22 October 1985) is a New Zealand former professional rugby union player.

Reid was educated at Rosmini College in Auckland.

A NZ Colts representative prop, Reid played his provincial rugby with North Harbour and was appointed team captain for their 2010 ITM Cup campaign. He got a Blues cap during the 2010 Super 14 season, coming on off the bench against the Stormers at Eden Park. An injury to his foot tendons necessitated his retirement from rugby aged 25.
