= Joe Walsh (rugby union) =

New Zealand rugby union player

- Born: 23 July 1993 (age 33) New Plymouth, New Zealand
- Height: 191 cm (6 ft 3 in)
- Weight: 124 kg (273 lb; 19 st 7 lb)
- School: Hamilton Boys' High School

Rugby union career
- Position: Prop
- Current team: Southland
Senior career
Years	Team	Apps	(Points)
2015	Waikato	2	(0)
2016–	Southland	34	(5)
2020	Blues	1	(0)
- Correct as of 7 September 2020

Joe Walsh (born 23 July 1993 in New Zealand) is a New Zealand rugby union player who plays for the Blues in Super Rugby. His primary playing position is prop. He was named in the Blues side in round 7 in 2020.
