= Matthew Johnson (rugby union) =

- Born: Matthew Johnson; 20 April 1994 (age 32) Auckland, New Zealand
- Height: 191 cm (6 ft 3 in)
- Weight: 100 kg (15 st 10 lb; 220 lb)
- School: St Peter's College

Rugby union career
- Position: Centre
Senior career
Years	Team	Apps	(Points)
2017–	Southland	9	(10)
Super Rugby
Years	Team	Apps	(Points)
2018–	Blues	0	(0)

Matthew Johnson (born 20 April 1994) is a New Zealand rugby union player who plays for the Blues in the Super Rugby competition. His position of choice is centre.
