= Mitchell Dunshea =

NZ rugby union player

- Full name: Mitchell Thomas William Dunshea
- Born: 18 November 1995 (age 30) Hamilton, New Zealand
- Height: 197 cm (6 ft 6 in)
- Weight: 115 kg (254 lb; 18 st 2 lb)
- School: Lincoln High School
- Notable relative: Lyndon Dunshea (brother)

Rugby union career
- Position(s): Lock, Flanker
- Current team: Canterbury, Crusaders
Senior career
Years	Team	Apps	(Points)
2015–	Canterbury	55	(25)
2017–	Crusaders	38	(5)
- Correct as of 6 September 2020
International career
Years	Team	Apps	(Points)
2015	New Zealand U20	7	(10)
2017	New Zealand Barbarians	1	(0)
2020	South Island	1	(0)
- Correct as of 6 September 2020

Mitchell Thomas William Dunshea (born 18 November 1995) is a New Zealand Rugby Union player who currently plays as a lock or loose forward for Canterbury in New Zealand's domestic Mitre 10 Cup and the Crusaders in the international Super Rugby competition.

== Early career ==
Born in Hamilton, Dunshea moved south to New Zealand's South Island at a young age and attended Lincoln High School just outside Christchurch. He moved on to Lincoln University after graduating from high school where he began studying Sports and Recreation and turned out for their rugby side in the Canterbury local leagues. In 2015, he helped them to win their first Division 1 title since 1981. He also won the national colts title with Canterbury's under-20 side in 2014.

== Senior career ==
Dunshea made his breakthrough in senior rugby playing for Canterbury in the 2015 ITM Cup where he played 11 times as they lifted the Premiership title with a 25–23 victory over Auckland in the final. A foot injury meant that he played no part in Canterbury's 2016 Mitre 10 Cup campaign which saw them finish as champions for the 8th time in 9 years.

== Super Rugby ==
An excellent debut season at provincial level for Canterbury saw him make the Crusaders wider training group for the 2016 Super Rugby season. A foot injury ruled him out for the entire year, but nonetheless he was promoted to the senior squad for 2017.

== International ==
Dunshea was a member of the New Zealand Under-20 side which won the 2015 World Rugby Under 20 Championship in Italy, playing 4 times.

== Career honours ==
New Zealand Under-20

- World Rugby Under 20 Championship – 2015

Canterbury'

- National Provincial Championship – 2015
