= Sebastian Siataga =

- Full name: Sebastian Peaario Siataga
- Born: 27 January 1993 (age 33) New Zealand
- Height: 1.78 m (5 ft 10 in)
- Weight: 105 kg (231 lb; 16 st 7 lb)

Rugby union career
- Position: Hooker
Senior career
Years	Team	Apps	(Points)
2013, 2019	Canterbury	12	(10)
2015–2017	Bay of Plenty	13	(0)
2017	Chiefs	2	(0)
2018	Crusaders	2	(0)
2020	Southland	5	(0)
- Correct as of 28 February 2021
International career
Years	Team	Apps	(Points)
2013	Samoa U20	4	(0)
- Correct as of 16 June 2021

Sebastian Peaario Siataga (born 27 January 1993) is a New Zealand born Samoan rugby union player. His position is hooker. He has played Super Rugby for both the Chiefs and Crusaders.
