= TJ Va'a =

Tennessee James Va'a
- Born: 10 June 1996 (age 30) New Zealand
- Height: 179 cm (5 ft 10 in)
- Weight: 86 kg (13 st 8 lb; 190 lb)

Rugby union career
- Position: Fly-half
Senior career
Years	Team	Apps	(Points)
2016–	Wellington	2	(0)
Super Rugby
Years	Team	Apps	(Points)
2018–	Hurricanes	0	(0)

TJ Va'a (born 10 June 1996) is a New Zealand rugby union player who plays for the Hurricanes in the Super Rugby competition. His position of choice is fly-half.
