= Regan Verney =

Personal information
- Born: 19 November 1992 (age 33) Hāwera, New Zealand
- Height: 182 cm (6 ft 0 in)
- Weight: 93 kg (14 st 9 lb; 205 lb)

Playing information
- Position: Five Eighth
Club
Years	Team	Pld	T	G	FG	P
	Hawera Hawks
	Northern Pride
	Mackay Cutters
	Total	0	0	0	0	0
Representative
Years	Team	Pld	T	G	FG	P
	New Zealand Maori

Rugby union career
- Position: Centre
- Current team: Wellington, Chiefs
Senior career
Years	Team	Apps	(Points)
2017	Wellington	11	(20)
2018	Chiefs	0	(0)

Regan Verney (born 19 November 1992) is a New Zealand rugby union player who plays for the Chiefs in the Super Rugby competition. His position of choice is centre.

In 2015 he changed codes briefly and played rugby league for the Cairns-based Queensland Cup side, the Northern Pride.
