= Mike Tamoaieta =

Samoan-born rugby union player (1995–2019)

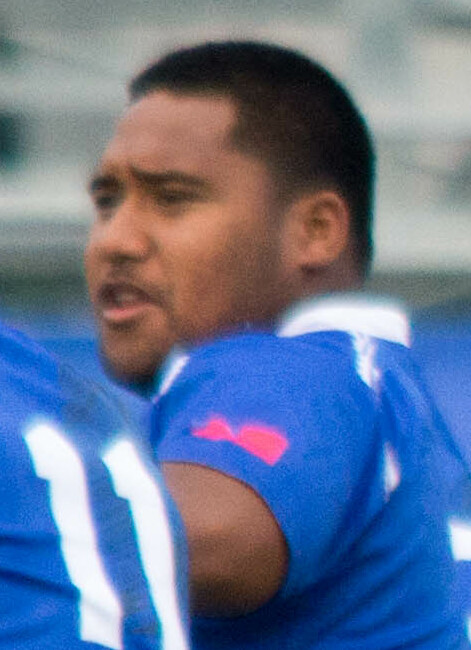
- Born: 6 July 1995 Apia, Samoa
- Died: 1 March 2019 (aged 23)
- Height: 176 cm (5 ft 9 in)
- Weight: 118 kg (18 st 8 lb; 260 lb)
- School: Sacred Heart College

Rugby union career
- Position: Prop
Senior career
Years	Team	Apps	(Points)
2017–2018	North Harbour	18	(0)
2018	Blues	10	(0)
- Correct as of 29 September 2018
International career
Years	Team	Apps	(Points)
2015	Samoa U20	5	(0)
- Correct as of 20 June 2015

Michael Tamoaieta (6 July 1995 – 1 March 2019) was a Samoan-born rugby union player. A prop, Tamoaieta represented North Harbour at a provincial level, and played for the Blues in the Super Rugby competition.

Tamoaieta died on 1 March 2019.

== Professional career ==
=== 2017–2019 ===
In August 2017, the North Harbour Rugby Union released their 33-man squad for the 2017 Mitre 10 Cup with the inclusion of Tamoaieta. He was one of five players announced to make their debut in week one of the competition against Otago at QBE Stadium. Tamoaieta started in the match day fifteen at tighthead prop.

== Personal life ==
=== Death ===
Tamoaieta died on 1 March 2019, aged 23, at his home in Auckland which was announced on social media by his partner Helen Ti'eti'e the following day. The cause of death was not made public. Tributes and condolences were offered by New Zealand Rugby chief executive Steve Tew, New Zealand international Ardie Savea, and the Blues Super Rugby franchise. In week two of the 2019 Super Rugby season, New Zealand teams, the Chiefs, the Crusaders, and the Blues wore black armbands to pay their respects and an acknowledgment of his life at their respective games in Hamilton, Brisbane, and Argentina.

== Statistics ==
Club	Year	Competition	GP	GS	TRY	CON	PEN	DGL	PTS	WL%	Yellow card	Red card
North Harbour	2017	Mitre 10 Cup (incl. Ranfurly Shield)	11	8	0	0	0	0	0	72.73	0	0
North Harbour	2018	Mitre 10 Cup (incl. Ranfurly Shield)	7	2	0	0	0	0	0	57.14	0	0
Blues	2018	Super Rugby	10	2	0	0	0	0	0	30.00	0	0
Career			28	12	0	0	0	0	0	53.57	0	0

Updated: 29 September 2018 Source: Michael Tamoaieta Rugby History
