= Fin Hoeata =

- Born: 28 December 1996 (age 29) New Zealand
- Height: 197 cm (6 ft 6 in)
- Weight: 105 kg (16 st 7 lb; 231 lb)

Rugby union career
- Position: Lock
Senior career
Years	Team	Apps	(Points)
2017–	Taranaki	10	(0)
Super Rugby
Years	Team	Apps	(Points)
2017–	Chiefs	0	(0)

Fin Hoeata (born 28 December 1996) is a New Zealand rugby union player who plays for the Chiefs in the Super Rugby competition. His position of choice is lock.
