= Fraser Armstrong (rugby union) =

NZ rugby union player

- Full name: Fraser Paul Armstrong
- Born: 18 April 1992 (age 34) Te Awamutu, New Zealand
- Height: 193 cm (6 ft 4 in)
- Weight: 125 kg (276 lb; 19 st 10 lb)
- School: Hamilton Boys' High School

Rugby union career
- Position: Prop
- Current team: Manawatu, Hurricanes
Senior career
Years	Team	Apps	(Points)
2013	Waikato	1	(0)
2014	Auckland	1	(0)
2015–	Manawatu	44	(5)
2018–2021	Hurricanes	24	(0)
- Correct as of 9 February 2020
International career
Years	Team	Apps	(Points)
2012	New Zealand U20	4	(0)
- Correct as of 9 February 2020

Fraser Armstrong (born 18 April 1992) is a New Zealand rugby union player who currently plays as a prop for Manawatu in New Zealand's domestic Mitre 10 Cup.

== Early career ==
Armstrong attended Hamilton Boys' High School and during that time played first XV rugby for them as well as making his way through the age grades with his local province, Waikato.

== Senior career ==
He was first named in Waikato's squad ahead of the 2012 ITM Cup, however he didn't make any appearances and had to wait until the following year before making his senior debut. With game time severely limited in Waikato, he shifted north and joined Auckland in 2014. Again he found his chances limited there, making just 1 appearance before being loaned to the Manawatu Turbos in 2015. The Turbos were in need of new props due to injuries to Ma'afu Fia and Chris Eves and this allowed Armstrong to become a regular in their side. He made 9 appearances, 5 of which were from the start and scored 1 try in 2015 and followed that up with 8 appearances the following year.

== International ==
Armstrong was a New Zealand Schoolboys representative in 2010 and was also a member of the New Zealand Under 20 side which finished as runner-up in the 2012 IRB Junior World Championship in South Africa.
