= Glenn Preston =

New Zealand rugby union player (born 1992)

- Full name: Glenn Lincoln Preston
- Born: 13 April 1992 (age 34) Auckland, New Zealand
- Height: 193 cm (6 ft 4 in)
- Weight: 105 kg (231 lb; 16 st 7 lb)
- School: Birkenhead College

Rugby union career
- Position(s): Flanker, Number 8
- Current team: Southland
Senior career
Years	Team	Apps	(Points)
2012–2018	North Harbour	33	(5)
2014–2016	San Donà	34	(50)
2018	Blues	1	(0)
2020–	Southland	0	(0)
- Correct as of 8 September 2020
International career
Years	Team	Apps	(Points)
2012	New Zealand U20	2	(5)
- Correct as of 8 September 2020

Glenn Preston (born 13 April 1992) is a New Zealand rugby union player who plays for the Blues in the Super Rugby competition. His position of choice is flanker.
