= Matiaha Martin =

- Born: 3 June 1992 (age 34) Hamilton, New Zealand
- Height: 2.01 m (6 ft 7 in)
- Weight: 112 kg (17 st 9 lb; 247 lb)
- Occupation: Māori Teacher at Tangaroa College

Rugby union career
- Position: Lock
- Current team: Counties Manukau
Senior career
Years	Team	Apps	(Points)
2016–present	Counties Manukau	11	(0)
2017	Chiefs	0	(0)
- Correct as of 19 November 2016

Matiaha Martin (born 3 June 1992) is a New Zealand rugby union lock for Counties Manukau in the domestic Mitre 10 Cup.

== Senior career ==
After coming through the ranks of Counties Manukau's under-18, B and development teams, Martin cracked the senior squad in 2016 Mitre 10 Cup. He took advantage of injuries to several key players to establish himself as a regular in a side which reached the premiership semifinals and lost to Canterbury. He played all eleven of the Steelers games during the campaign, nine from the start. He was drafted into the Chiefs squad shortly before the 2017 Super Rugby season.
