= Harry Allan (rugby union) =

New Zealand rugby union player (born 1997)

- Full name: Harrison Michael Allan
- Born: 7 May 1997 (age 29) Christchurch, New Zealand
- Height: 183 cm (6 ft 0 in)
- Weight: 112 kg (247 lb; 17 st 9 lb)
- School: St. Andrew's College

Rugby union career
- Position: Prop
- Current team: Crusaders, Canterbury
Senior career
Years	Team	Apps	(Points)
2018–	Crusaders	9	(0)
2018–	Canterbury	4	(0)
- Correct as of 13 April 2019
International career
Years	Team	Apps	(Points)
2017	New Zealand U20	6	(0)
- Correct as of 13 April 2019

Harrison Michael Allan (born 7 May 1997) is a New Zealand rugby union player who plays for the Crusaders in the Super Rugby competition. His position of choice is prop.
