= Sam Prattley =

NZ rugby union player (born 1990)

- Full name: Samuel Murray John Prattley
- Born: 16 January 1990 (age 36) Blenheim, New Zealand
- Height: 1.96 m (6 ft 5 in)
- Weight: 113 kg (17 st 11 lb; 249 lb)
- School: Nelson College

Rugby union career
- Position: Prop
- Current team: Auckland
Senior career
Years	Team	Apps	(Points)
2010–2012	Tasman	29	(0)
2013–2017	Blues	39	(5)
2013–	Auckland	53	(5)
2018	Chiefs	10	(0)
- Correct as of 19 November 2018
International career
Years	Team	Apps	(Points)
2010	New Zealand U20	3	(5)
- Correct as of 19 October 2014

Samuel Murray John Prattley (born 16 January 1990) is a New Zealand rugby union player who currently plays as a prop for Auckland in the ITM Cup.

== Early career ==
Born in Blenheim, and raised in the rural town of Rai Valley, Prattley played rugby from an early age and followed in the footsteps of his father and uncle in representing the Pelorus Rugby club. He moved to nearby Nelson to attend high school at Nelson College and played first XV rugby during his time there.

== Senior career ==
After graduating high school, Prattley made his way through club rugby and then made his national provincial championship bow in 2010 with the Nelson-based Tasman Makos for whom he would go on to make 29 appearances for in 3 seasons. He headed north to join Auckland ahead of the 2013 ITM Cup and quickly established himself as a regular in the number 1 jersey. He made 9 appearances, 6 of which were from the start in his first season in New Zealand's largest city before starting all 11 of Auckland's games during the 2014 ITM Cup which saw them reach the Premiership semi-finals before losing to Taranaki after extra-time.

2015 saw him play an additional 9 games for Auckland as they reached the Premiership final before losing narrowly to Canterbury while 2016 was a year of disappointment both for him and his side. Auckland missed out on the Premiership play-offs altogether with a 5th place finish on the log standings and injury limited Prattley to just 5 starts during the season.

== Super Rugby ==
During his time with Tasman, Prattley was involved in the Crusaders and Highlanders wider training groups but did not make any Super Rugby appearances. His move north to Auckland opened up new doors for him and injuries in the Blues front-row saw him brought in as emergency cover during the 2013 Super Rugby season. He went on to represent the Blues 4 times that year and was upgraded to a full contract for the following season. He turned out 10 times in 2014 and 9 times in 2015 with the majority of his appearances coming from the substitutes bench.

2016 saw Tana Umaga replace Sir John Kirwan as Blues head coach and this change saw Prattley become a more regular starter, playing 10 times during the season with 9 of these appearances coming from the start. Despite his injury problems during New Zealand's 2016 domestic season, Prattley maintained his place in the Blues squad for 2017.

== International ==
Prattley was a member of the New Zealand Under-20 side which won the 2010 IRB Junior World Championship. He scored 1 try in the 3 appearances as the tournament which was held in Argentina.

== Career Honours ==
New Zealand Under-20

- World Rugby Under 20 Championship - 2010

== Super Rugby Statistics ==
As of 26 November 2016

Season	Team	Games	Starts	Sub	Mins	Tries	Cons	Pens	Drops	Points	Yel	Red
2013	Blues	4	2	2	219	0	0	0	0	0	0	0
2014	Blues	10	2	8	236	0	0	0	0	0	0	0
2015	Blues	9	3	6	219	0	0	0	0	0	0	0
2016	Blues	10	9	1	586	1	0	0	0	5	0	0
Total		33	16	17	1260	1	0	0	0	5	0	0
