= Jeff Thwaites =

- Full name: Jeffrey Robert Thwaites
- Born: 22 November 1992 (age 33) Tauranga, New Zealand
- Height: 190 cm (6 ft 3 in)
- Weight: 125 kg (276 lb; 19 st 10 lb)
- School: Tauranga Boys' College

Rugby union career
- Position: Prop
Senior career
Years	Team	Apps	(Points)
2015–2022	Bay of Plenty	67	(10)
2018	Chiefs	14	(0)
2019	Kobelco Steelers	1	(0)
2020–2021	Highlanders	14	(0)
- Correct as of 5 June 2022

Jeffrey Robert Thwaites (born 22 November 1992) is a New Zealand rugby union player who currently plays for the Highlanders since 2020 in the Super Rugby competition and for Bay of Plenty in the mitre10 cup competition. Jeff is married to Black fern and Chiefs Manawa player Kelsie Thwaites née Wills. His position of choice is tighthead prop.
