= Jacob Pierce =

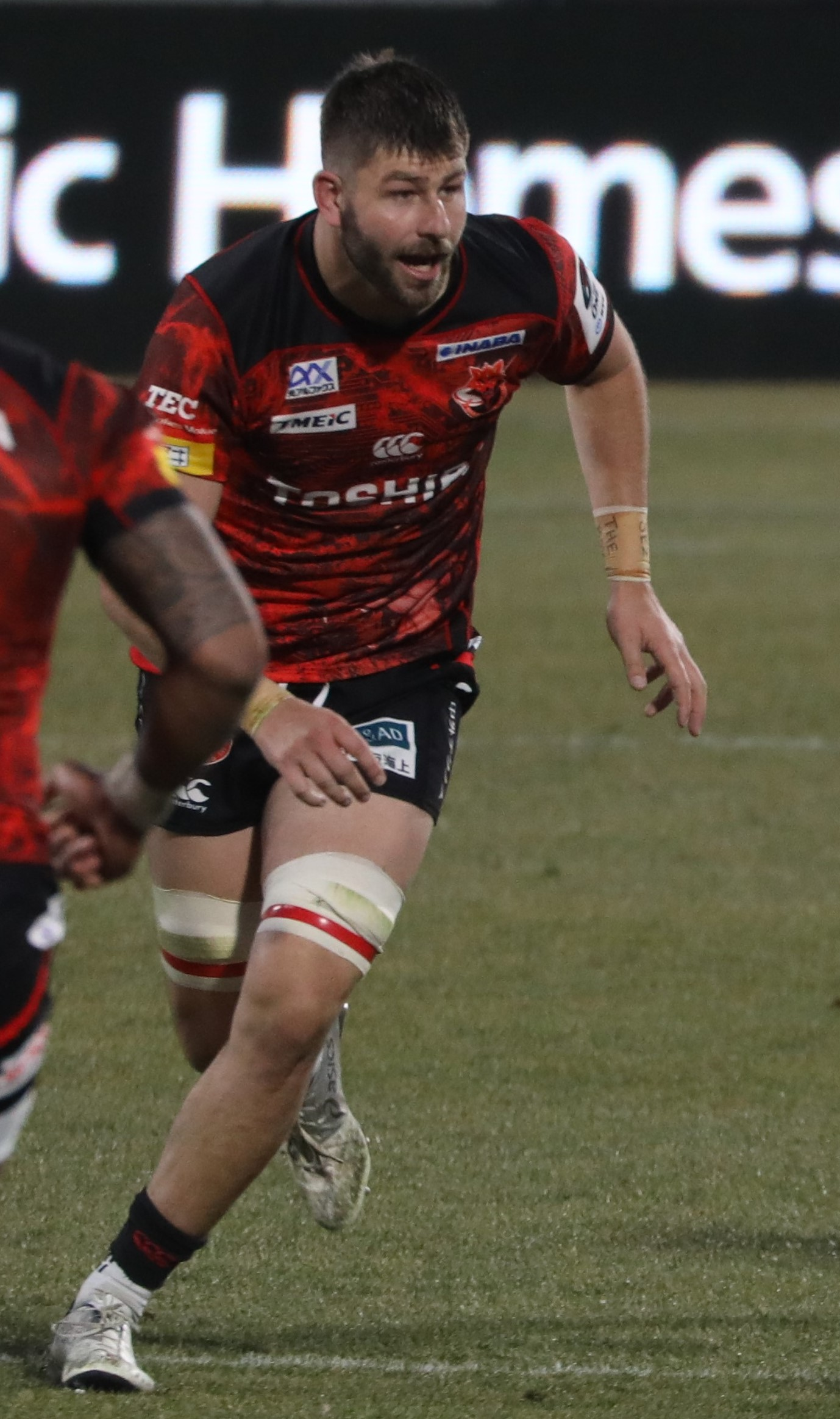
- Full name: Jacob William Laing Pierce
- Born: 10 September 1997 (age 29) Auckland, New Zealand
- Height: 202 cm (6 ft 8 in)
- Weight: 115 kg (254 lb; 18 st 2 lb)
- School: Rosmini College

Rugby union career
- Position: Lock
- Current team: Toshiba Brave Lupus Tokyo
Senior career
| Years | Team | Apps | (Points) |
| 2018–2021 | Blues | 9 | (0) |
| 2018–2021 | North Harbour | 27 | (5) |
| 2021- | Brave Lupus | 75 | (85) |
- Correct as of 12 July 2021
International career
| Years | Team | Apps | (Points) |
| 2021- | New Zealand U20 | 5 | (0) |
- Correct as of 12 April 2019

Jacob William Laing Pierce (born 10 September 1997) is a New Zealand rugby union player who plays for the Brave Lupus in the Japan Rugby League One . His position of choice is lock.

== Early life ==
Jacob Pierce is eligible to represent Japan since he spent his first 10 years living in Yamaguchi, Shizuoka and Kanagawa.
