= Lyndon Dunshea =

- Born: 18 December 1991 (age 34) New Zealand
- Height: 1.97 m (6 ft 6 in)
- Weight: 114 kg (17 st 13 lb; 251 lb)
- School: Lincoln High School

Rugby union career
- Position: Lock
Provincial / State sides
Years	Team	Apps	(Points)
2017–	Auckland	2	(0)
- Correct as of 19 November 2018
Super Rugby
Years	Team	Apps	(Points)
2018	Blues	2	(0)
- Correct as of 19 November 2018

Lyndon Dunshea is a New Zealand rugby union player who plays for the Blues in the Super Rugby competition. His position of choice is lock.
