= List of 2016–17 Super Rugby transfers (New Zealand) =

This is a list of player movements for New Zealand Super Rugby teams prior to the end of the 2017 Super Rugby season. Departure and arrivals of all players that were included in a Super Rugby squad for 2016 or 2017 are listed here, regardless of when it occurred. Future-dated transfers are only included if confirmed by the player or his agent, his former team or his new team.

Teams usually name their squads for 2017 – typically containing around 35–40 players – in late 2016 or early 2017. In addition to the main squad, teams can also name additional players that train in backup or development squads for the franchises. These players are denoted by (wider training group) for New Zealand teams, or (extended playing squad) for Australian teams.

== Notes ==
- 2016 players listed are all players that were named in the initial senior squad, or subsequently included in a 23-man match day squad at any game during the season.
- (did not play) denotes that a player did not play at all during one of the two seasons due to injury or non-selection. These players are included to indicate they were contracted to the team.
- (short-term) denotes that a player wasn't initially contracted, but came in during the season. This could either be a club rugby player coming in as injury cover, or a player whose contract had expired at another team (typically in the northern hemisphere).
- Flags are only shown for players moving to or from another country.
- Players may play in several positions, but are listed in only one.

== Transfers ==
=== Blues ===
Blues transfers 2016–17
Pos	2016 squad	Out	In	2017 squad
PR	Charlie Faumuina; Sione Mafileo; Nic Mayhew; Sam Prattley; Ofa Tu'ungafasi; Namatahi Waa (wider training group)	(substituted off) Nic Mayhew (to (Australia) Brumbies); (substituted off) Namatahi Waa (to Northland)	(substituted on) Alex Hodgman (from Crusaders); (substituted on) Pauliasi Manu (from Chiefs)	Charlie Faumuina; Alex Hodgman; Sione Mafileo; Pauliasi Manu; Sam Prattley; Ofa Tu'ungafasi
HK	Quentin MacDonald; Matt Moulds; James Parsons	(substituted off) Quentin MacDonald (to (France) Oyonnax)	(substituted on) Epalahame Faiva (from Waikato)	Epalahame Faiva; Matt Moulds; James Parsons
LK	Josh Bekhuis; Gerard Cowley-Tuioti; Hoani Matenga; Scott Scrafton (wider training group); Patrick Tuipulotu	(substituted off) Josh Bekhuis (to (France) Lyon); (substituted off) Hoani Matenga (to Wellington)	(substituted on) Josh Goodhue (from Northland); (substituted on) Brandon Nansen (from North Harbour); (substituted on) Leighton Price (from Taranaki)	Gerard Cowley-Tuioti; Josh Goodhue; Brandon Nansen (did not play); Leighton Price (short-term); Scott Scrafton; Patrick Tuipulotu
FL	Joe Edwards (wider training group); Blake Gibson; Jerome Kaino; Tanerau Latimer; Steve Luatua; Kara Pryor; Jack Ram	(substituted off) Joe Edwards (to Auckland); (substituted off) Tanerau Latimer (to (France) Bayonne); (substituted off) Jack Ram (to Northland)	(substituted on) Murphy Taramai (from North Harbour); (substituted on) Jimmy Tupou (from Crusaders)	Blake Gibson; Jerome Kaino; Steve Luatua; Kara Pryor; Murphy Taramai; Jimmy Tupou
N8	Akira Ioane			Akira Ioane
SH	Billy Guyton; Bryn Hall; Sam Nock	(substituted off) Bryn Hall (to Crusaders)	(substituted on) Augustine Pulu (from Chiefs)	Billy Guyton; Sam Nock; Augustine Pulu
FH	Matt McGahan; Piers Francis (wider training group); Ihaia West	(substituted off) Matt McGahan (to North Harbour)	(substituted on) Bryn Gatland (from North Harbour)	Piers Francis; Bryn Gatland (short-term); Ihaia West
CE	TJ Faiane (wider training group, did not play); Rieko Ioane; Rene Ranger; Male Sa'u; Matt Vaega (wider training group)	(substituted off) Male Sa'u (to (Japan) Yamaha Júbilo)	(substituted on) Michael Collins (from Otago); (substituted on) Sonny Bill Williams (from Chiefs)	Michael Collins; TJ Faiane; Rieko Ioane; Rene Ranger; Matt Vaega (did not play); Sonny Bill Williams
WG	Matt Duffie; Afa Fa'atau (wider training group, did not play); Ben Lam (did not play); Tevita Li; George Moala; Melani Nanai	(substituted off) Afa Fa'atau (to North Harbour); (substituted off) Ben Lam (to Hurricanes); (substituted off) Tevita Li (to Highlanders)	(substituted on) Declan O'Donnell (from Taranaki)	Matt Duffie; George Moala; Melani Nanai; Declan O'Donnell
FB	Michael Little (wider training group, did not play); Jordan Trainor (wider training group, did not play); Lolagi Visinia	(substituted off) Michael Little (to North Harbour); (substituted off) Lolagi Visinia (to Auckland)	(substituted on) Stephen Perofeta (from Taranaki)	Stephen Perofeta; Jordan Trainor
Coach	Tana Umaga			Tana Umaga

=== Chiefs ===
Chiefs transfers 2016–17
Pos	2016 squad	Out	In	2017 squad
PR	Siegfried Fisiihoi (wider training group); Mitchell Graham; Kane Hames (short-term); Nepo Laulala (did not play); Pauliasi Manu; Atunaisa Moli; Siate Tokolahi; Hiroshi Yamashita	(substituted off) Pauliasi Manu (to Blues); (substituted off) Siate Tokolahi (to Highlanders); (substituted off) Hiroshi Yamashita (to (Japan) Kobelco Steelers)	(substituted on) Sefo Kautai (from Waikato); (substituted on) Aidan Ross (from Bay of Plenty)	Siegfried Fisiihoi; Mitchell Graham (did not play); Kane Hames; Sefo Kautai; Nepo Laulala; Atunaisa Moli; Aidan Ross
HK	Hika Elliot; Nathan Harris; Rhys Marshall (wider training group)	(substituted off) Rhys Marshall (to (Ireland) Munster)	(substituted on) Brayden Mitchell (from Southland); (substituted on) Liam Polwart (from Bay of Plenty); (substituted on) Sebastian Siataga (from Bay of Plenty); (substituted on) Samisoni Taukei'aho (from Waikato)	Hika Elliot; Nathan Harris; Brayden Mitchell (short-term); Liam Polwart; Sebastian Siataga (short-term); Samisoni Taukei'aho (short-term)
LK	Michael Allardice; Dominic Bird; Brodie Retallick; James Tucker (wider training group)		(substituted on) Matiaha Martin (from Counties Manukau)	Michael Allardice; Dominic Bird; Matiaha Martin (did not play); Brodie Retallick; James Tucker
FL	Johan Bardoul; Lachlan Boshier (short-term); Sam Cane; Sam Henwood; Mitchell Karpik (did not play); Tevita Koloamatangi; Liam Messam (short-term); Tom Sanders; Taleni Seu	(substituted off) Johan Bardoul (to (Japan) Yamaha Júbilo); (substituted off) Sam Henwood (to Counties Manukau); (substituted off) Tevita Koloamatangi (to Tasman)		Lachlan Boshier; Sam Cane; Mitchell Karpik; Liam Messam; Tom Sanders; Taleni Seu
N8	Mitchell Brown (short-term); Michael Leitch; Ma'ama Vaipulu	(substituted off) Ma'ama Vaipulu (to (France) Castres)		Mitchell Brown; Michael Leitch
SH	Kayne Hammington (short-term); Tawera Kerr-Barlow; Augustine Pulu (did not play); Brad Weber	(substituted off) Kayne Hammington (to Highlanders); (substituted off) Augustine Pulu (to Blues)	(substituted on) Finlay Christie (from Tasman); (substituted on) Jonathan Taumateine (from Counties Manukau)	Finlay Christie; Tawera Kerr-Barlow; Jonathan Taumateine; Brad Weber (did not play)
FH	Aaron Cruden; Stephen Donald (wider training group)			Aaron Cruden; Stephen Donald
CE	Anton Lienert-Brown; Charlie Ngatai; Seta Tamanivalu; Sam Vaka (wider training group); Sonny Bill Williams (did not play)	(substituted off) Seta Tamanivalu (to Crusaders); (substituted off) Sam Vaka (to Counties Manukau); (substituted off) Sonny Bill Williams (to Blues)	(substituted on) Solomon Alaimalo (from Northland); (substituted on) Johnny Fa'auli (from Taranaki); (substituted on) Tim Nanai-Williams (from (Japan) Ricoh Black Rams); (substituted on) Alex Nankivell (from Tasman)	Solomon Alaimalo; Johnny Fa'auli; Anton Lienert-Brown; Tim Nanai-Williams; Alex Nankivell (short-term); Charlie Ngatai
WG	Glen Fisiiahi; James Lowe; Toni Pulu; Shaun Stevenson (wider training group); Chase Tiatia (did not play); Latu Vaeno (wider training group)	(substituted off) Latu Vaeno (to Taranaki)		Glen Fisiiahi (did not play); James Lowe; Toni Pulu; Shaun Stevenson; Chase Tiatia (did not play)
FB	Andrew Horrell; Damian McKenzie; Sam McNicol	(substituted off) Andrew Horrell (to (Japan) Coca-Cola Red Sparks)		Damian McKenzie; Sam McNicol
Coach	Dave Rennie			Dave Rennie

=== Crusaders ===
Crusaders transfers 2016–17
Pos	2016 squad	Out	In	2017 squad
PR	Michael Alaalatoa; Wyatt Crockett; Owen Franks; Alex Hodgman; Joe Moody; Tim Perry (wider training group, did not play)	(substituted off) Alex Hodgman (to Blues)	(substituted on) Oliver Jager (from Canterbury)	Michael Alaalatoa; Wyatt Crockett; Owen Franks; Oliver Jager; Joe Moody; Tim Perry
HK	Ben Funnell; Ged Robinson; Codie Taylor	(substituted off) Ged Robinson (retired)	(substituted on) Andrew Makalio (from Tasman)	Ben Funnell; Andrew Makalio; Codie Taylor
LK	Scott Barrett; Luke Romano; Jimmy Tupou; Sam Whitelock	(substituted off) Jimmy Tupou (to Blues)	(substituted on) Quinten Strange (from Tasman)	Scott Barrett; Luke Romano; Quinten Strange; Sam Whitelock
FL	Jed Brown (wider training group, did not play); Tim Boys; Mitchell Dunshea (wider training group, did not play); Reed Prinsep (short-term); Pete Samu; Jordan Taufua; Matt Todd	(substituted off) Tim Boys (to Southland); (substituted off) Reed Prinsep (to Hurricanes)	(substituted on) Heiden Bedwell-Curtis (from Manawatu); (substituted on) Vernon Fredericks (from Tasman)	Heiden Bedwell-Curtis; Jed Brown; Mitchell Dunshea; Vernon Fredericks (short-term); Pete Samu; Jordan Taufua; Matt Todd
N8	Kieran Read		(substituted on) Whetu Douglas (from Waikato)	Whetu Douglas (short-term); Kieran Read
SH	Mitchell Drummond; Andy Ellis; Leon Fukofuka (wider training group)	(substituted off) Andy Ellis (to (Japan) Kobelco Steelers)	(substituted on) Ere Enari (from Waikato); (substituted on) Bryn Hall (from Blues)	Mitchell Drummond; Ere Enari (short-term); Leon Fukofuka; Bryn Hall
FH	Marty McKenzie; Richie Mo'unga; Ben Volavola	(substituted off) Ben Volavola (to (Australia) Rebels)	(substituted on) Tim Bateman (from (Japan) Coca-Cola Red Sparks)	Tim Bateman; Marty McKenzie; Richie Mo'unga
CE	Ryan Crotty; Kieron Fonotia; Robbie Fruean (did not play); Jack Goodhue (wider training group, did not play); David Havili; Sean Wainui	(substituted off) Kieron Fonotia (to (Wales) Ospreys); (substituted off) Robbie Fruean (to (England) Bath)	(substituted on) Seta Tamanivalu (from Chiefs)	Ryan Crotty; Jack Goodhue; David Havili; Seta Tamanivalu; Sean Wainui
WG	Sione Fifita (did not play); Jone Macilai-Tori; Johnny McNicholl; Nemani Nadolo	(substituted off) Johnny McNicholl (to (Wales) Scarlets); (substituted off) Nemani Nadolo (to (France) Montpellier)	(substituted on) George Bridge (from Canterbury); (substituted on) Digby Ioane (from (Japan) Honda Heat); (substituted on) Manasa Mataele (from Taranaki)	George Bridge; Sione Fifita (did not play); Digby Ioane; Jone Macilai-Tori (did not play); Manasa Mataele
FB	Israel Dagg (wider training group); Mitchell Hunt			Israel Dagg; Mitchell Hunt
Coach	Todd Blackadder	(substituted off) Todd Blackadder (to (England) Bath (director of rugby))	(substituted on) Scott Robertson (from Canterbury)	Scott Robertson

=== Highlanders ===
Highlanders transfers 2016–17
Pos	2016 squad	Out	In	2017 squad
PR	Brendon Edmonds; Ross Geldenhuys; Siua Halanukonuka; Josh Hohneck; Daniel Lienert-Brown; Craig Millar (wider training group); Aki Seiuli (short-term)	(substituted off) Brendon Edmonds (injured); (substituted off) Ross Geldenhuys (to (South Africa) Southern Kings); (substituted off) Josh Hohneck (to (England) Gloucester)	(substituted on) Guy Millar (from (Australia) Force); (substituted on) Siate Tokolahi (from Chiefs)	Siua Halanukonuka; Daniel Lienert-Brown; Craig Millar; Guy Millar; Aki Seiuli; Siate Tokolahi
HK	Liam Coltman; Ash Dixon; Greg Pleasants-Tate (wider training group)		(substituted on) Sekonaia Pole (from Otago); (substituted on) Adrian Smith (from North Harbour)	Liam Coltman; Ash Dixon; Greg Pleasants-Tate; Sekonaia Pole (short-term); Adrian Smith (short-term)
LK	Alex Ainley; Tom Franklin; Jackson Hemopo (wider training group, did not play); Mark Reddish; Joe Wheeler	(substituted off) Mark Reddish (to (England) Harlequins)	(substituted on) Josh Dickson (from Otago)	Alex Ainley; Josh Dickson (did not play); Tom Franklin; Jackson Hemopo; Joe Wheeler
FL	Shane Christie; Gareth Evans; James Lentjes; Dan Pryor; Luke Whitelock		(substituted on) Dillon Hunt (from Otago); (substituted on) Tupou Sopoaga (from (Australia) Western Sydney Rams)	Shane Christie (did not play); Gareth Evans; Dillon Hunt (short-term); James Lentjes; Dan Pryor; Tupou Sopoaga (short-term); Luke Whitelock
N8	Elliot Dixon; Liam Squire			Elliot Dixon; Liam Squire
SH	Jamie Booth (short-term); Josh Renton; Aaron Smith; Fumiaki Tanaka (wider training group); Te Aihe Toma (short-term)	(substituted off) Jamie Booth (to Manawatu); (substituted off) Fumiaki Tanaka (to (Japan) Sunwolves); (substituted off) Te Aihe Toma (to Bay of Plenty)	(substituted on) Kayne Hammington (from Chiefs)	Kayne Hammington; Josh Renton; Aaron Smith
FH	Marty Banks; Hayden Parker; Fletcher Smith; Lima Sopoaga			Marty Banks; Hayden Parker (did not play); Fletcher Smith; Lima Sopoaga
CE	Jason Emery; Matt Faddes; Malakai Fekitoa; Rob Thompson; Sio Tomkinson (wider training group, did not play); Teihorangi Walden (wider training group)			Jason Emery (did not play); Matt Faddes; Malakai Fekitoa; Rob Thompson; Sio Tomkinson; Teihorangi Walden
WG	Richard Buckman (did not play); Waisake Naholo; Patrick Osborne; Ryan Tongia; Jack Wilson (wider training group)	(substituted off) Ryan Tongia (to (France) Bayonne); (substituted off) Jack Wilson (to (England) Bath)	(substituted on) Tevita Li (from Blues)	Richard Buckman; Tevita Li; Waisake Naholo; Patrick Osborne
FB	Ben Smith			Ben Smith
Coach	Jamie Joseph	(substituted off) Jamie Joseph (to Japan)	(substituted on) Tony Brown (from assistant coach)	Tony Brown

=== Hurricanes ===
Hurricanes transfers 2016–17
Pos	2016 squad	Out	In	2017 squad
PR	Chris Eves; Reggie Goodes; Mike Kainga (short-term); Ben May; Hisa Sasagi (wider training group, did not play); Jeffery Toomaga-Allen; Loni Uhila	(substituted off) Hisa Sasagi (to Otago)		Chris Eves; Reggie Goodes (did not play); Mike Kainga; Ben May; Jeffery Toomaga-Allen; Loni Uhila
HK	Leni Apisai (wider training group); Dane Coles; Motu Matu'u; Ricky Riccitelli (short-term)	(substituted off) Motu Matu'u (to (England) Gloucester)	(substituted on) James O'Reilly (from Wellington)	Leni Apisai; Dane Coles; James O'Reilly (short-term); Ricky Riccitelli
LK	Mark Abbott; James Blackwell (wider training group, did not play); James Broadhurst (did not play); Geoffrey Cridge; Michael Fatialofa (wider training group); Christian Lloyd (did not play)	(substituted off) Christian Lloyd (to Wellington)	(substituted on) Sam Lousi (from (Australia) Waratahs)	Mark Abbott; James Blackwell; James Broadhurst (did not play); Geoffrey Cridge (did not play); Michael Fatialofa; Sam Lousi
FL	Vaea Fifita; Callum Gibbins; Iopu Iopu-Aso (did not play); Tony Lamborn (wider training group); Hugh Renton (did not play); Ardie Savea; Brad Shields	(substituted off) Iopu Iopu-Aso (to Taranaki); (substituted off) Tony Lamborn (to Hawke's Bay)	(substituted on) Toa Halafihi (from Taranaki); (substituted on) Reed Prinsep (from Crusaders)	Vaea Fifita; Callum Gibbins; Toa Halafihi; Reed Prinsep; Hugh Renton; Ardie Savea; Brad Shields
N8	Blade Thomson; Victor Vito	(substituted off) Victor Vito (to (France) La Rochelle)		Blade Thomson
SH	Jamison Gibson-Park (wider training group); TJ Perenara; Te Toiroa Tahuriorangi	(substituted off) Jamison Gibson-Park (to (Ireland) Leinster)	(substituted on) Kylem O'Donnell (from Taranaki); (substituted on) Chris Smylie (from North Harbour)	Kylem O'Donnell (did not play); TJ Perenara; Chris Smylie (short-term); Te Toiroa Tahuriorangi
FH	Beauden Barrett; Otere Black; James Marshall; TJ Va'a (wider training group, did not play)	(substituted off) James Marshall (to (England) London Irish); (substituted off) TJ Va'a (to Wellington)		Beauden Barrett; Otere Black
CE	Pita Ahki (did not play); Vince Aso; Wes Goosen (short-term); Willis Halaholo (wider training group); Ngani Laumape	(substituted off) Willis Halaholo (to (Wales) Cardiff Blues)		Pita Ahki; Vince Aso; Wes Goosen; Ngani Laumape
WG	Cory Jane; Matt Proctor; Julian Savea		(substituted on) Ben Lam (from Blues); (substituted on) Peter Umaga-Jensen (from Wellington)	Cory Jane; Ben Lam; Matt Proctor; Julian Savea; Peter Umaga-Jensen (did not play)
FB	Nehe Milner-Skudder; Jason Woodward	(substituted off) Jason Woodward (to (England) Bristol)	(substituted on) Jordie Barrett (from Canterbury)	Jordie Barrett; Nehe Milner-Skudder
Coach	Chris Boyd			Chris Boyd

== See also ==
- List of 2016–17 Premiership Rugby transfers
- List of 2016–17 Pro12 transfers
- List of 2016–17 Top 14 transfers
- List of 2016–17 RFU Championship transfers
- SANZAAR
- Super Rugby franchise areas
