= 2014 ITM Cup =

2014 rugby union competition in New Zealand

2014 ITM Cup season
- Countries: New Zealand
- Date: 14 August – 25 October
- Champions: Taranaki
- Runners-up: Tasman
- Promoted: Manawatu
- Relegated: Wellington
- Matches played: 76
- Tries scored: 448 (average 5.9 per match)
- Top point scorer: Marty Banks (Tasman); 175 points
- Top try scorer: Ryan Tongia (Hawke's Bay); 10 tries

Official website
- www.provincial.rugby

The 2014 ITM Cup season was the ninth season of New Zealand's provincial rugby union competition since it turned professional in 2006. The regular season began on August 14, when Taranaki hosted Counties Manukau. It involved the top fourteen rugby unions of New Zealand. For sponsorship reasons, the competition was known as the ITM Cup and it was the fifth season under the lead sponsor. The winner of the Championship, Manawatu was promoted to the Premiership, and the seventh placed Premiership team, Wellington was relegated to the Championship.

== Format ==
The ITM Cup standings were sorted by a competition points system. Four points were awarded to the winning team, a draw equaled two points, whilst a loss amounted to zero points. Unions could also win their side a respectable bonus point. To receive a bonus point, they must have scored four tries or more or lose by seven or fewer points or less. Each team was placed on their total points received. If necessary of a tiebreaker, when two or more teams finish on equal points, the union who defeated the other in a head-to-head got placed higher. In case of a draw between them, the side with the biggest points deferential margin got rights to be ranked above. If they were tied on points difference, it was then decided by a highest scored try count or a coin toss. This seeding format was implemented since the beginning of the 2006 competition.

The competition included a promotion-relegation process with the winner of the Championship receiving automatic promotion to the Premiership, replacing the seventh-placed team in the Premiership which was relegated to the Championship for the following year. The regular season consisted of two types of matches. The internal division matches were when each team played the other six unions in their division once, home or away. The cross-division matches were when each team played four teams from the other division, thus missing out on three teams, each from the opposite division. Each union played home or away games against teams from the other division, making a total of ten competition games for each union. The finals format allowed the top four teams from each division move on to the semi-finals. The top two division winners, based on table points, received a home semi-final. In the first round of the finals, the semi-finals, the second division winner hosted the third division winner, and the first division winner hosted the fourth division winner. The final was hosted by the top remaining seed.

== Standings ==
Source: ITM Cup standings 2014

Premiership Division
#	Team	GP	W	D	L	PF	PA	PD	TB	LB	PTS
1	Taranaki	10	7	1	2	321	197	+124	7	1	38
2	Tasman	10	7	1	2	326	194	+132	6	2	38
3	Canterbury	10	7	0	3	337	205	+132	4	2	34
4	Auckland	10	6	1	3	288	225	+63	4	0	30
5	Counties Manukau	10	5	1	4	251	192	+59	4	2	28
6	Waikato	10	4	0	6	220	321	–101	3	2	21
7	Wellington	10	1	0	9	214	381	–167	1	2	7

Championship Division
#	Team	GP	W	D	L	PF	PA	PD	TB	LB	PTS
1	Manawatu	10	8	0	2	260	208	+52	3	0	35
2	RS – Hawke's Bay	10	5	1	4	253	213	+40	4	2	28
3	Northland	10	5	0	5	276	284	–8	3	2	25
4	Southland	10	4	1	5	228	301	–73	1	0	19
5	North Harbour	10	3	0	7	214	306	–92	3	3	18
6	Otago	10	3	0	7	228	279	–51	1	2	15
7	Bay of Plenty	10	2	0	8	202	312	–110	3	2	13

=== Standings progression ===
Premiership
Team	W1	W2	W3	W4	W5	W6	W7	W8	W9
Auckland	0 (7th)	5 (4th)	7 (6th)	11 (4th)	15 (4th)	20 (4th)	20 (4th)	25 (4th)	30 (4th)
Canterbury	5 (1st)	10 (1st)	15 (1st)	19 (1st)	24 (1st)	28 (1st)	30 (3rd)	30 (3rd)	34 (3rd)
Counties Manukau	2 (4th)	7 (3rd)	8 (5th)	8 (6th)	9 (6th)	9 (6th)	14 (6th)	19 (5th)	28 (5th)
Taranaki	2 (5th)	3 (6th)	13 (2nd)	18 (2nd)	22 (2nd)	27 (2nd)	32 (1st)	37 (1st)	38 (1st)
Tasman	5 (2nd)	10 (2nd)	12 (3rd)	16 (3rd)	17 (3rd)	27 (3rd)	32 (2nd)	37 (2nd)	38 (2nd)
Waikato	5 (3rd)	5 (5th)	9 (4th)	10 (5th)	15 (5th)	15 (5th)	16 (5th)	16 (6th)	21 (6th)
Wellington	0 (6th)	0 (7th)	1 (7th)	2 (7th)	2 (7th)	2 (7th)	2 (7th)	2 (7th)	7 (7th)
Championship
Team	W1	W2	W3	W4	W5	W6	W7	W8	W9
Bay of Plenty	0 (5th)	1 (7th)	1 (7th)	7 (6th)	7 (6th)	7 (6th)	8 (7th)	13 (7th)	13 (7th)
Hawke's Bay	0 (7th)	4 (4th)	9 (2nd)	10 (3rd)	15 (3rd)	20 (2nd)	21 (2nd)	26 (2nd)	28 (2nd)
Manawatu	4 (3rd)	4 (5th)	8 (4th)	16 (1st)	16 (1st)	21 (1st)	25 (1st)	30 (1st)	35 (1st)
North Harbour	0 (6th)	1 (6th)	2 (6th)	3 (7th)	7 (7th)	7 (7th)	16 (5th)	17 (5th)	18 (5th)
Northland	1 (4th)	6 (2nd)	6 (5th)	10 (4th)	16 (2nd)	16 (3rd)	20 (3rd)	25 (3rd)	25 (3rd)
Southland	4 (2nd)	8 (1st)	8 (3rd)	8 (5th)	13 (4th)	13 (5th)	17 (4th)	17 (4th)	19 (4th)
Otago	4 (1st)	5 (3rd)	9 (1st)	10 (2nd)	10 (5th)	15 (4th)	15 (6th)	15 (6th)	15 (6th)
The table above shows a team's progression throughout the season. For each week, their cumulative points total is shown with the overall division log position in brackets.
Key:	Win	Draw	Loss	Bye					

== Regular season ==
The 2014 ITM Cup was played across nine weeks with every team playing one Wednesday night fixture in a double-up round where they played twice that week. The competition started on 14 August, with Taranaki taking on Counties Manukau at Yarrow Stadium.

=== Week 1 ===
14 August 2014
19:35 NZST

Taranaki	9–9	Counties Manukau
Pen: Codey Rei (2/3) 21', 28'; Marty McKenzie (1/2) 78'	Report	Pen: Ahsee Tuala (1/1) 52'; Baden Kerr (2/2) 67', 73'

Yarrow Stadium, New Plymouth
Referee: Nick Briant (New Zealand)

15 August 2014
19:35 NZST

Southland	34–23	Bay of Plenty
Try: Lolohea Loco 11'; Elliot Dixon 35'; Junior Ngaluafe 70'; Con: Lima Sopoaga (2/3) 36', 71'; Pen: Lima Sopoaga (5/6) 3', 28', 40', 47', 65'	Report	Try: Johan Bardoul 6'; Siegfried Fisiihoi 73'; Con: Daniel Hollinshead (2/2) 7', 74'; Pen: Daniel Hollinshead (3/5) 26', 52', 60'

Rugby Park Stadium, Invercargill
Referee: Brendon Pickerill (New Zealand)

16 August 2014
14:35 NZST

Otago	28–14	North Harbour
Try: Fa'asiu Fuatai (2) 20', 29'; James Lentjes 71'; Con: Hayden Parker (2/3) 21', 30'; Pen: Hayden Parker (3/4) 4', 17', 46'	Report	Try: Tevita Li 14'; James Parsons 39'; Con: Daniel Halangahu (2/2) 15', 40'; Pen: Daniel Halangahu (0/1)

Forsyth Barr Stadium, Dunedin
Referee: Kane McBride (New Zealand)

16 August 2014
16:35 NZST

Canterbury	48–9	Auckland
Try: Joel Everson 11'; Adam Whitelock 15'; Johnny McNicholl (2) 27', 46'; Matt Todd 62'; Patrick Osborne 80'; Con: Tom Taylor (4/4) 12', 16', 28', 47'; Tyler Bleyendaal (1/1) 63'; Richie Mo'unga (1/1) 80'; Pen: Tom Taylor (2/2) 22', 39'	Report	Pen: Gareth Anscombe (3/3) 18', 20', 44'; Cards: Peter Saili (yellow card) 61'

Rugby League Park, Christchurch
Referee: Garratt Williamson (New Zealand)

16 August 2014
18:35 NZST

Wellington	25–37	Waikato
Try: Shaun Treeby 17'; Jared Kahu 61'; Vaea Fifita 77'; Con: Jason Woodward (2/3) 62', 77'; Pen: Jason Woodward (2/2) 11', 22'	Report	Try: Damian McKenzie 3'; Joe Webber (2) 12', 31'; Brayden Mitchell 34'; Anton Lienert-Brown 36'; Zak Hohneck 64'; Con: Damian McKenzie (2/6) 36', 65'; Pen: Damian McKenzie (1/1) 24'

Wellington Regional Stadium, Wellington
Attendance: 3,274
Referee: Shane McDermott (New Zealand)

17 August 2014
14:35 NZST

Tasman	35–15	Hawke's Bay
Try: Joe Wheeler 1'; Bryce Heem 38'; Tom Marshall 49'; David Havili 55'; Con: Marty Banks (3/4) 2', 39', 50'; Pen: Marty Banks (3/3) 12', 20', 30'	Report	Try: Robbie Fruean 52'; Brendon O'Connor 62'; Con: Ihaia West (1/2) 53'; Pen: Ihaia West (1/2) 23'

Lansdowne Park, Blenheim
Referee: Glen Jackson (New Zealand)

17 August 2014
16:35 NZST

Northland	23–28	Manawatu
Try: Filipo Nakosi 56'; Sonatane Takulua 65'; Con: Daniel Hawkins (2/2) 57', 67'; Pen: Daniel Hawkins (2/2) 12', 42'; Mathew Wright (1/1) 22'; Cards: Daniel Hawkins (yellow card) 14'	Report	Try: Antonio Kiri Kiri 47'; Hamish Northcott 70'; Callum Gibbins 75'; Con: Jade Te Rure (2/3) 71', 76'; Pen: Jade Te Rure (3/3) 7', 15', 35'

Okara Park, Whangārei
Referee: Ben O'Keeffe (New Zealand)

=== Week 2 ===
21 August 2014
19:35 NZST

North Harbour	21–25	Southland
Try: Matt McGahan 1'; Nafi Tuitavake 8'; Con: Matt McGahan (1/2) 9'; Pen: Matt McGahan (2/2) 43', 52'; Drop: Robbie Robinson 45'	Report	Try: Willis Halaholo 37'; Con: Lima Sopoaga (1/1) 38'; Pen: Lima Sopoaga (6/7) 6', 23', 30', 55', 62', 76'

North Harbour Stadium, Albany
Referee: Angus Mabey (New Zealand)

22 August 2014
18:05 NZST

Waikato	27–58	Canterbury
Try: Joe Webber 16'; Brad Weber (2) 47', 62'; Con: Damian McKenzie (3/3) 17', 48', 63'; Pen: Albert Nikoro (1/1) 24'; Damian McKenzie (1/1) 29'	Report	Try: Codie Taylor 1'; Matt Todd 5'; Matt Symons 8'; Milford Keresoma 36'; Tyler Bleyendaal 52'; Patrick Osborne 56'; Jack Goodhue 67'; Tom Sanders 79'; Con: Tyler Bleyendaal (2/4) 9', 37'; Willi Heinz (3/3) 53', 57', 68'; Mitchell Drummond (1/1) 80'; Pen: Tyler Bleyendaal (2/2) 12', 26'

Waikato Stadium, Hamilton
Referee: Shane McDermott (New Zealand)

22 August 2014
20:05 NZST

Hawke's Bay	29–26	Taranaki
Try: Ryan Tongia (2) 12', 68'; Richard Buckman 36'; Con: Ihaia West (1/3) 13'; Pen: Ihaia West (3/4) 10', 32', 40'; Drop: Ihaia West 80'	Report	Try: Seta Tamanivalu 6'; Marty McKenzie 75'; Con: Codey Rei (1/1) 7'; Marty McKenzie (1/1) 76'; Pen: Codey Rei (4/5) 19', 21', 29', 46'

McLean Park, Napier
Referee: Michael Lash (New Zealand)

23 August 2014
14:35 NZST

Northland	35–5	Wellington
Try: Jone Macilai-Tori (2) 7', 24'; Warren Dunn 53'; Dan Pryor (2) 57', 79'; Con: Daniel Hawkins (2/5) 8', 58'; Pen: Daniel Hawkins (2/2) 4', 50'	Report	Try: Jason Woodward 65'; Con: Jason Woodward (0/1)

Okara Park, Whangārei
Referee: Brendon Pickerill (New Zealand)

23 August 2014
16:35 NZST

RS – Counties Manukau	29–25	Otago
Try: Daniel Hyatt 13'; Ronald Raaymakers 26'; Jordan Taufua 49'; Michael Stanley 65'; Con: Ahsee Tuala (3/3) 14', 27', 50'; Michael Stanley (0/1); Pen: Ahsee Tuala (0/2); Michael Stanley (1/1) 75'	Report	Try: Liam Coltman 8'; Aki Seiuli 72'; Fa'asiu Fuatai 77'; Con: Hayden Parker (2/3) 9', 73'; Pen: Hayden Parker (2/3) 16', 52'

ECOLight Stadium, Pukekohe
Referee: Nick Briant (New Zealand)

24 August 2014
14:35 NZST

Manawatu	7–35	Auckland
Try: Chris Eves 80'; Con: Otere Black (1/1) 80'; Cards: Hubert Buydens (yellow card) 30'; Kayne Hammington (yellow card) 66'	Report	Try: Gareth Anscombe 4'; George Moala 14'; Francis Saili 70'; Peter Saili 73'; Con: Gareth Anscombe (2/2) 5', 15'; Simon Hickey (1/2) 74'; Pen: Gareth Anscombe (3/5) 10', 30', 44'

Arena Manawatu, Palmerston North
Referee: Mike Fraser (New Zealand)

24 August 2014
16:35 NZST

Bay of Plenty	27–56	Tasman
Try: Mike Kainga 1'; Joe Royal 40'; Maritino Nemani 44'; Johan Bardoul 68'; Con: Daniel Hollinshead (2/4) 2', 69'; Pen: Daniel Hollinshead (1/2) 15'	Report	Try: Quentin MacDonald 5'; Tom Marshall 22'; Shane Christie 27'; Kieron Fonotia 33'; James Lowe 61'; Marty Banks 76'; David Havili 79'; Con: Marty Banks (6/7) 6', 23', 28', 34', 77', 80'; Pen: Marty Banks (3/6) 17', 25', 74'

Baypark Stadium, Tauranga
Referee: Ben O'Keeffe (New Zealand)

=== Week 3 ===
27 August 2014
19:35 NZST

Waikato	17–46	Taranaki
Try: Declan O'Donnell 44'; Joe Webber 49'; Con: Wharenui Hawera (2/2) 45', 50'; Pen: Wharenui Hawera (1/2) 13'	Report	Try: Waisake Naholo (2) 19', 80'; Marty McKenzie (2) 29', 33'; Jackson Ormond 55'; Seta Tamanivalu 64'; Con: Marty McKenzie (4/5) 20', 30', 34', 56'; Codey Rei (1/1) 80'; Pen: Marty McKenzie (2/3) 6', 40'

Waikato Stadium, Hamilton
Referee: Damian Mitchelmore (Australia)

28 August 2014
19:35 NZST

Canterbury	48–3	Northland
Try: Mitchell Drummond 25'; Nasi Manu (2) 31', 55'; Tom Sanders 45'; Jack Goodhue 48'; Patrick Osborne 70'; Con: Colin Slade (6/6) 26', 32', 46', 49', 56', 71'; Pen: Colin Slade (2/2) 22', 39'	Report	Pen: Daniel Hawkins (1/2) 15'

Rugby League Park, Christchurch
Referee: Akihisa Aso (Japan)

29 August 2014
19:35 NZST

Wellington	21–27	Manawatu
Try: Jason Woodward 67'; Tolu Fahamokioa 72'; Con: Jason Woodward (1/2) 73'; Pen: Jason Woodward (3/4) 4', 19', 48'	Report	Try: Otere Black 50'; Jamie Booth 60'; Con: Otere Black (1/2) 51'; Pen: Otere Black (5/5) 31', 33', 54', 70', 79'

Wellington Regional Stadium, Wellington
Attendance: 2,749
Referee: Richard Kelly (New Zealand)

30 August 2014
14:35 NZST

Counties Manuaku	21–27	Hawke's Bay – RS
Try: Onosai Auva'a 48'; Augustine Pulu 58'; Con: Tim Nanai-Williams (1/2) 49'; Pen: Ahsee Tuala (2/3) 10', 20'; Tim Nanai-Williams (1/1) 37'	Report	Try: Brendon O'Connor (2) 17', 27'; Chris Eaton 34'; Ryan Tongia 66'; Con: Ihaia West (2/4) 28', 67'; Pen: Ihaia West (1/1) 40'

ECOLight Stadium, Pukekohe
Referee: Mike Fraser (New Zealand)

30 August 2014
17:35 NZST

Southland	22–33	Otago
Try: Willis Halaholo 6'; Mark Jackman 12'; John Hardie 59'; Con: Lima Sopoaga (2/3) 7', 13'; Pen: Lima Sopoaga (1/2) 53'; Cards: Elliot Dixon (yellow card) 60'	Report	Try: Teihorangi Walden 23'; Michael Collins 27'; Josh Renton 54'; Con: Hayden Parker (3/3) 24', 28', 55'; Pen: Hayden Parker (4/6) 2', 9', 33', 49'; Cards: Tom Franklin (yellow card) 59'

Rugby Park Stadium, Invercargill
Referee: Grant Stuart (New Zealand)

30 August 2014
19:35 NZST

North Harbour	16–22	Waikato
Try: David Raikuna 9'; Con: Matt McGahan (1/1) 10'; Pen: Matt McGahan (3/5) 33', 46', 52'	Report	Try: Ben Tameifuna 38'; Con: Damian McKenzie (1/1) 39'; Pen: Damian McKenzie (5/6) 15', 21', 26', 30', 64'; Cards: Ben Tameifuna (yellow card) 71'

North Harbour Stadium, Albany
Referee: Kane McBride (New Zealand)

31 August 2014
14:35 NZST

Taranaki	41–3	Bay of Plenty
Try: Codey Rei 18'; Blade Thomson 23'; Waisake Naholo 26'; James Broadhurst 29'; Charlie Ngatai 35'; Marty McKenzie 78'; Con: Marty McKenzie (4/6) 19', 27', 36', 79'; Pen: Marty McKenzie (1/2) 10'	Report	Pen: Daniel Hollinshead (1/1) 21'; Cards: Siaosi Iongi (yellow card) 23'

Yarrow Stadium, New Plymouth
Referee: Akihisa Aso (Japan)

31 August 2014
16:35 NZST

Auckland	16–16	Tasman
Try: Steven Luatua 60'; Con: Simon Hickey (1/1) 61'; Pen: Simon Hickey (3/4) 37', 43', 65'	Report	Try: Quentin MacDonald 18'; Con: Marty Banks (1/1) 19'; Pen: Marty Banks (3/4) 25', 46', 74'

Eden Park, Auckland
Attendance: 2,700
Referee: Damian Mitchelmore (Australia)

=== Week 4 ===
3 September 2014
19:35 NZST

Manawatu	29–27	Bay of Plenty
Try: Nathan Tudreu 32'; Antonio Kiri Kiri 35'; Newton Tudreu 48'; Con: Otere Black (1/3) 36'; Pen: Otere Black (4/4) 5', 19', 22', 71'	Report	Try: Siegfried Fisiihoi 11'; Culum Retallick 24'; Mike Kainga 75'; Joe Royal 78'; Con: Daniel Hollinshead (1/2) 12'; Te Aihe Toma (1/2) 79'; Pen: Daniel Hollinshead (0/1); Byron McGuigan (1/1) 54'

Arena Manawatu, Palmerston North
Referee: Mike Fraser (New Zealand)

4 September 2014
19:35 NZST

Otago	16–23	Canterbury
Try: Jayden Spence 22'; Con: Hayden Parker (1/1) 23'; Pen: Hayden Parker (3/3) 4', 14', 78'	Report	Try: Nasi Manu 38'; Rob Thompson 57'; Con: Richie Mo'unga (2/2) 39', 58'; Pen: Richie Mo'unga (3/3) 27', 47', 63'

Forsyth Barr Stadium, Dunedin
Referee: Richard Kelly (New Zealand)

5 September 2014
18:05 NZST

Tasman	23–16	Waikato
Try: Robbie Malneek 4'; Siua Halanukonuka 79'; Con: Marty Banks (2/2) 5', 80'; Pen: Marty Banks (3/5) 9', 33', 40'	Report	Try: Declan O'Donnell 48'; Con: Damian McKenzie (1/1) 49'; Pen: Damian McKenzie (3/3) 12', 51', 59'

Trafalgar Park, Nelson
Referee: Kane McBride (New Zealand)

5 September 2014
20:05 NZST

Northland	23–21	Hawke's Bay
Try: Dan Pryor 57'; Michael Stolberg 80'; Con: Daniel Hawkins (2/2) 58', 80'; Pen: Daniel Hawkins (3/4) 9', 37', 61'	Report	Try: Brendon O'Connor 29'; Ryan Tongia 53'; Con: Ihaia West (1/2) 54'; Pen: Ihaia West (2/3) 4', 33'; Matt Berquist (1/1) 70'; Cards: Geoffrey Cridge (yellow card) 80'

Okara Park, Whangārei
Referee: Ben O'Keeffe (New Zealand)

6 September 2014
14:35 NZST

Auckland	31–30	Wellington
Try: Blake Gibson 48'; Simon Hickey 72'; Vince Aso 75'; Con: Gareth Anscombe (2/3) 49', 72'; Pen: Gareth Anscombe (4/5) 6', 10', 41', 58'	Report	Try: Tumatauenga Umaga-Marshall 11'; Shaun Treeby 32'; Ambrose Curtis 35'; Con: Jason Woodward (3/3) 12', 33', 36'; Pen: Jason Woodward (3/4) 2', 18', 21'; Cards: Brad Shields (yellow card) 71'

Eden Park, Auckland
Attendance: 3,300
Referee: Nick Briant (New Zealand)

6 September 2014
16:35 NZST

Taranaki	41–19	Southland
Try: Jamison Gibson-Park 12'; Blade Thomson (2) 23', 33'; Iopu Iopu-Aso 43'; Seta Tamanivalu 60'; James Broadhurst 80'; Con: Marty McKenzie (3/5) 13', 24', 44'; Codey Rei (1/1) 80'; Pen: Marty McKenzie (0/1); Drop: Marty McKenzie 69'	Report	Try: John Hardie (2) 3', 38'; Dillan Halaholo 77'; Con: Lima Sopoaga (2/2) 4', 39'; Jamie Verran (0/1)

Yarrow Stadium, New Plymouth
Referee: Brendon Pickerill (New Zealand)

7 September 2014
14:35 NZST

Manawatu	26–10	Counties Manukau
Try: Jason Emery 44'; Jade Te Rure 51'; Con: Jade Te Rure (2/2) 45', 52'; Pen: Jade Te Rure (2/2) 1', 20'; Otere Black (2/3) 70', 77'	Report	Try: Onosai Auva'a 68'; Con: Ahsee Tuala (1/1) 69'; Pen: Michael Stanley (1/3) 24'

Arena Manawatu, Palmerston North
Referee: Michael Lash (New Zealand)

7 September 2014
16:35 NZST

Bay of Plenty	21–14	North Harbour
Try: Mike Kainga 24'; Leroy Van Dam 42'; Con: Nick Evemy (1/2) 25'; Pen: Te Aihe Toma (0/1); Nick Evemy (3/4) 36', 52', 74'	Report	Try: James Parsons 19'; Greg Pleasants-Tate 38'; Con: Matt McGahan (2/2) 20', 39'; Pen: Matt McGahan (0/3)

Rotorua International Stadium, Rotorua
Referee: Grant Stuart (New Zealand)

=== Week 5 ===
10 September 2014
19:35 NZST

Otago	23–40	Northland
Try: Tom Franklin 18'; Hayden Parker 32'; Con: Hayden Parker (2/2) 20', 34'; Pen: Hayden Parker (2/2) 6', 40'; Peter Breen (1/1) 67'	Report	Try: Namatahi Waa 1'; Jack Ram (2) 21', 69'; Ross Wright 62'; Matt Moulds 77'; Con: Daniel Hawkins (3/5) 22', 70', 78'; Pen: Daniel Hawkins (3/4) 27', 41', 50'; Cards: Daniel Hawkins (yellow card) 51'

Forsyth Barr Stadium, Dunedin
Referee: Michael Lash (New Zealand)

11 September 2014
19:35 NZST

Tasman	30–31	Taranaki
Try: Pete Samu 28'; Joe Wheeler 38'; Jimmy Cowan 55'; Con: Marty Banks (3/3) 30', 40', 56'; Pen: Marty Banks (3/5) 21', 66', 75'	Report	Try: Blade Thomson 41'; Seta Tamanivalu 49'; Waisake Naholo 80'; Con: Marty McKenzie (2/3) 50', 80'; Pen: Marty McKenzie (4/4) 8', 26', 69', 78'

Trafalgar Park, Nelson
Referee: Shane McDermott (New Zealand)

12 September 2014
18:05 NZST

North Harbour	24–13	Manawatu
Try: Luke Devcich 22'; Pita Ahki 43'; Con: Daniel Halangahu (1/2) 44'; Pen: Daniel Halangahu (4/6) 6', 15', 66', 75'	Report	Try: Callum Gibbins 29'; Con: Otere Black (1/1) 30'; Pen: Otere Black (2/3) 11', 50'

North Harbour Stadium, Albany
Referee: Nick Briant (New Zealand)

12 September 2014
20:05 NZST

Canterbury	46–12	Wellington
Try: Tom Taylor (2) 13', 53'; Willi Heinz 30'; Codie Taylor 45'; Tom Sanders 63'; Luke Whitelock 67'; Ben Funnell 77'; Con: Tom Taylor (4/7) 31', 55', 68', 78'; Pen: Tom Taylor (1/2) 26'; Cards: Joel Everson (yellow card) 32'	Report	Try: Christian Lloyd 51'; Brad Shields 80'; Con: Jason Woodward (1/2) 80'; Pen: Jason Woodward (0/1); Cards: Matt Proctor (yellow card) 66'

Rugby League Park, Christchurch
Referee: Brendon Pickerill (New Zealand)

13 September 2014
14:35 NZST

Bay of Plenty	12–27	Auckland
Try: Joe Royal 13'; Johan Bardoul 31'; Con: Nick Evemy (1/2) 14'; Pen: Nick Evemy (0/1)	Report	Try: Lolagi Visinia (2) 42', 53'; Con: Gareth Anscombe (1/2) 43'; Pen: Gareth Anscombe (5/7) 41', 46', 59', 71', 73'

Rotorua International Stadium, Rotorua
Referee: Kane McBride (New Zealand)

13 September 2014
16:35 NZST

Southland	36–34	Northland
Try: Keanu Kahukura (2) 12', 36'; Mark Jackman 46'; Tim Boys 65'; Lolohea Loco 80'; Con: Lima Sopoaga (4/5) 13', 47', 66', 80'; Pen: Lima Sopoaga (1/1) 6'	Report	Try: Matt Moulds 19'; Mathew Wright (2) 31', 55'; Con: Daniel Hawkins (2/3) 20', 56'; Pen: Daniel Hawkins (5/5) 9', 30', 42', 69', 72'; Cards: Whiria Meltzer (yellow card) 65'

Rugby Park Stadium, Invercargill
Referee: Richard Kelly (New Zealand)

14 September 2014
14:35 NZST

Waikato	26–21	Counties Manukau
Try: Joe Webber (3) 3', 14', 60'; Chauncy Edwardson 8'; Con: Damian McKenzie (3/4) 4', 15', 62'; Pen: Damian McKenzie (0/2); Cards: Loni Uhila (yellow card) 66'	Report	Try: Ahsee Tuala 55'; Augustine Pulu (2) 68', 74'; Con: Ahsee Tuala (3/3) 56', 68', 75'; Pen: Michael Stanley (0/1)

Waikato Stadium, Hamilton
Referee: Ben O'Keeffe (New Zealand)

14 September 2014
16:35 NZST

RS – Hawke's Bay	41–0	Otago
Try: Ryan Tongia (2) 1', 5'; Brendon O'Connor 8'; Shannan Chase 25'; Richard Buckman 33'; Jason Long 73'; Con: Ihaia West (4/6) 7', 9', 26', 74'; Pen: Ihaia West (1/1) 49'	Report

McLean Park, Napier
Referee: Garratt Williamson (New Zealand)

=== Week 6 ===
17 September 2014
19:35 NZST

Southland	14–38	Tasman
Try: Dillan Halaholo 28'; Bill Fukofuka 68'; Con: Lima Sopoaga (1/1) 29'; Scott Eade (1/1) 70'	Report	Try: Pete Samu 10'; Jimmy Cowan 20'; Marty Banks 23'; James Lowe (2) 47', 63'; Con: Marty Banks (5/5) 11', 21', 24', 49', 65'; Pen: Marty Banks (1/1) 7'; Cards: Jimmy Cowan (yellow card) 54'

Rugby Park Stadium, Invercargill
Referee: Mike Fraser (New Zealand)

18 September 2014
19:35 NZST

Northland	20–31	Taranaki
Try: Brook Gilmore 17'; Jone Macilai-Tori 74'; Con: Daniel Hawkins (2/2) 18', 75'; Pen: Daniel Hawkins (2/2) 42', 63'; Cards: Jone Macilai-Tori (yellow card) 6'	Report	Try: Seta Tamanivalu 29'; Marty McKenzie 58'; Blade Thomson 70'; Waisake Naholo 77'; Con: Marty McKenzie (1/4) 78'; Pen: Marty McKenzie (2/3) 9', 21'; Codey Rei (1/1) 44'

Okara Park, Whangārei
Referee: Grant Stuart (New Zealand)

19 September 2014
19:35 NZST

Counties Manukau	20–28	Canterbury
Try: Frank Halai (2) 52', 79'; Con: Michael Stanley (1/1) 53'; Sherwin Stowers (1/1) 79'; Pen: Tim Nanai-Williams (1/3) 7'; Ahsee Tuala (1/3) 27'; Cards: Sikeli Nabou (yellow card) 58'	Report	Try: Matt Todd 10'; Johnny McNicholl 19'; Willi Heinz 46'; Con: Tom Taylor (2/3) 11', 20'; Pen: Tom Taylor (3/3) 34', 38', 73'

ECOLight Stadium, Pukekohe
Referee: Glen Jackson (New Zealand)

20 September 2014
14:35 NZST

RS – Hawke's Bay	36–17	Bay of Plenty
Try: Michael Allardice 32'; Ihaia West (2) 42', 70'; Ryan Tongia (2) 63', 80'; Con: Ihaia West (1/3) 43'; Richard Buckman (0/1); Matt Berquist (0/1); Pen: Ihaia West (3/3) 16', 22', 28'	Report	Try: Maritino Nemani 67'; Jesse Acton 74'; Con: Nick Evemy (2/2) 68', 74'; Pen: Nick Evemy (1/2) 25'; Cards: Culum Retallick (yellow card) 31'; Maritino Nemani (red card) 77'

McLean Park, Napier
Referee: Kane McBride (New Zealand)

20 September 2014
17:35 NZST

Auckland	32–7	North Harbour
Try: Ben Lam 12'; Hadleigh Parkes 50'; Gafatasi Su'a 73'; Gareth Anscombe 78'; Con: Gareth Anscombe (2/3) 51', 74'; Simon Hickey (1/1) 79'; Pen: Gareth Anscombe (2/4) 19', 40'	Report	Try: Pita Ahki 80'; Con: Matt McGahan (1/1) 80'

Eden Park, Auckland
Attendance: 4,200
Referee: Michael Lash (New Zealand)

20 September 2014
19:35 NZST

Manawatu	41–20	Southland
Try: Nathan Tudreu 16'; Heiden Bedwell-Curtis 25'; Newton Tudreu 36'; Jason Emery 55'; Semisi Masirewa 79'; Con: Otere Black (4/4) 17', 26', 37', 56'; Jade Te Rure (1/1) 80'; Pen: Otere Black (2/2) 22', 44'	Report	Try: Elliot Dixon 39'; John Hardie 74'; Con: Lima Sopoaga (2/2) 40', 74'; Pen: Lima Sopoaga (2/2) 15', 28'; Cards: Elliot Dixon (yellow card) 21'

Arena Manawatu, Palmerston North
Referee: Garratt Williamson (New Zealand)

21 September 2014
14:35 NZST

Otago	38–7	Waikato
Try: Tom Franklin 3'; Teihorangi Walden 30'; Hayden Parker 60'; Fa'asiu Fuatai 71'; Con: Hayden Parker (3/4) 4', 31', 62'; Pen: Hayden Parker (4/4) 9', 14', 55', 58'	Report	Try: Damian McKenzie 6'; Con: Damian McKenzie (1/1) 7'

Forsyth Barr Stadium, Dunedin
Referee: Shane McDermott (New Zealand)

21 September 2014
16:35 NZST

Wellington	20–42	Tasman
Try: Tolu Fahamokioa 67'; Eric Sione 75'; Con: Willie Ripia (2/2) 68', 76'; Pen: Willie Ripia (2/2) 30', 36'	Report	Try: Robbie Malneek 15'; James Lowe (2) 19', 49'; Alex Ainley 44'; Pete Samu 72'; Con: Marty Banks (4/5) 20', 45', 50', 73'; Pen: Marty Banks (3/4) 28', 33', 39'

Wellington Regional Stadium, Wellington
Attendance: 2,848
Referee: Brendon Pickerill (New Zealand)

=== Week 7 ===
24 September 2014
19:35 NZST

North Harbour	29–24	Canterbury
Try: Leigh Thompson 10'; Tevita Li 23'; James Parsons 35'; Niko Ratumaitavuki 52'; Con: Matt McGahan (3/4) 24', 35', 53'; Pen: Matt McGahan (1/1) 49'	Report	Try: Nathaniel Apa 1'; Codie Taylor 7'; Willi Heinz 66'; Con: Richie Mo'unga (3/3) 1', 7', 67'; Pen: Richie Mo'unga (1/1) 77'

North Harbour Stadium, Albany
Referee: Paul Williams (New Zealand)

25 September 2014
19:35 NZST

Bay of Plenty	27–30	Northland
Try: Siaosi Iongi 19'; Joe Royal 24'; Tim Bond 64'; Con: Daniel Hollinshead (3/3) 20', 25', 65'; Pen: Daniel Hollinshead (2/3) 41', 54'	Report	Try: Sonatane Takulua (2) 2', 35'; Warren Dunn 67'; Con: Daniel Hawkins (2/2) 2', 36'; Latiume Fosita (1/1) 68'; Pen: Daniel Hawkins (2/2) 8', 56'; Latiume Fosita (1/1) 78'

Baypark Stadium, Tauranga
Referee: Angus Mabey (New Zealand)

26 September 2014
19:35 NZST

Taranaki	35–22	Auckland
Try: Rhys Marshall 17'; Bernie Hall 22'; Seta Tamanivalu 32'; Charlie Ngatai 80'; Con: Marty McKenzie (3/4) 18', 23', 80'; Pen: Marty McKenzie (2/4) 39', 70'; Drop: Marty McKenzie 79'	Report	Try: George Moala 54'; Con: Gareth Anscombe (1/1) 55'; Pen: Gareth Anscombe (5/5) 11', 26', 35', 58', 79'

Yarrow Stadium, New Plymouth
Referee: Glen Jackson (New Zealand)

27 September 2014
19:35 NZST

Waikato	20–22	Manawatu
Try: Joe Webber 17'; Con: Damian McKenzie (0/1); Pen: Damian McKenzie (5/9) 5', 39', 45', 59', 69'; Cards: Josh Hohneck (yellow card) 74'	Report	Try: Jason Emery 43'; Con: Jade Te Rure (1/1) 44'; Pen: Jade Te Rure (2/2) 8', 28'; Otere Black (3/3) 60', 64', 75'; Cards: Michael Fitzgerald (yellow card) 69'

Waikato Stadium, Hamilton
Referee: Brett Johnson (New Zealand)

27 September 2014
14:35 NZST

Counties Manukau	55–7	Wellington
Try: Augustine Pulu (2) 3', 33'; Suliasi Taufalele 8'; Frank Halai 21'; Ahsee Tuala 36'; Tim Nanai-Williams (2) 64', 78'; Con: Ahsee Tuala (5/5) 3', 9', 23', 34', 37'; Tim Nanai-Williams (1/1) 65'; Sherwin Stowers (1/1) 80'; Pen: Ahsee Tuala (1/2) 39'; Tim Nanai-Williams (1/1) 47'; Cards: Ma'ama Vaipulu (yellow card) 23'	Report	Try: Ambrose Curtis 53'; Con: Willie Ripia (1/1) 53'; Pen: Willie Ripia (0/1)

ECOLight Stadium, Pukekohe
Referee: Nick Briant (New Zealand)

27 September 2014
19:35 NZST

North Harbour	28–25	Hawke's Bay
Try: Luke Devcich 5'; Tevita Li 9'; Matt McGahan 48'; Con: Matt McGahan (2/3) 6', 49'; Pen: Matt McGahan (3/3) 15', 40', 70'	Report	Try: Ellery Wilson 54'; Robbie Fruean 57'; Brendon Edmonds 72'; Con: Ihaia West (1/2) 58'; Matt Berquist (1/1) 73'; Pen: Ihaia West (2/2) 17', 62'; Cards: Ryan Tongia (yellow card) 30'

North Harbour Stadium, Albany
Referee: Michael Lash (New Zealand)

28 September 2014
14:35 NZST

Tasman	32–24	Otago
Try: Kieron Fonotia 30'; David Havili 37'; Jimmy Cowan 64'; Ross Geldenhuys 70'; Con: Marty Banks (3/4) 31', 38', 65'; Pen: Marty Banks (2/3) 57', 79'	Report	Try: Jayden Spence 33'; Hugh Blake 44'; Sam Anderson-Heather 54'; Con: Hayden Parker (3/3) 34', 46', 55'; Pen: Hayden Parker (1/1) 18'

Trafalgar Park, Nelson
Referee: Kane McBride (New Zealand)

28 September 2014
16:35 NZST

Canterbury	26–28	Southland
Try: Nathaniel Apa 10'; Penalty try 64'; Con: Dan Carter (1/1) 11'; Richie Mo'unga (1/1) 65'; Pen: Dan Carter (3/3) 15', 36', 40'; Richie Mo'unga (1/2) 43'	Report	Try: Bryan Milne 12'; John Hardie 54'; Willis Halaholo 68'; Con: Lima Sopoaga (2/3) 13', 69'; Pen: Lima Sopoaga (3/3) 24', 59', 78'

Rugby League Park, Christchurch
Referee: Richard Kelly (New Zealand)

=== Week 8 ===
1 October 2014
19:35 NZST

RS – Hawke's Bay	36–14	Wellington
Try: Gareth Evans 13'; Brendon O'Connor 39'; Ryan Tongia (2) 44', 65'; Tony Lamborn 49'; Con: Ihaia West (4/5) 14', 40', 44', 50'; Pen: Ihaia West (0/1); Matt Berquist (1/1) 77'	Report	Try: Matt Proctor 72'; Con: Willie Ripia (0/1); Pen: Willie Ripia (3/3) 10', 15', 21'; Cards: Vaea Fifita (yellow card) 37'

McLean Park, Napier
Referee: Glen Jackson (New Zealand)

2 October 2014
19:35 NZST

Auckland	60–19	Waikato
Try: Junior Poluleuligaga 6'; Lolagi Visinia 14'; Gafatasi Su'a 31'; Joe Edwards 33'; George Moala (2) 36', 57'; Gareth Anscombe 45'; Jack Whetton 51'; Blake Gibson 65'; Con: Gareth Anscombe (4/7) 15', 34', 37', 46'; Simon Hickey (2/2) 58', 66'; Pen: Gareth Anscombe (1/1) 3'	Report	Try: Loni Uhila 48'; Anton Lienert-Brown 54'; Epalahame Faiva 69'; Con: Damian McKenzie (2/3) 49', 55'

Eden Park, Auckland
Attendance: 3,000
Referee: Ben O'Keeffe (New Zealand)

3 October 2014
19:35 NZST

Northland	58–27	North Harbour
Try: Ross Wright 15'; Mathew Wright (3) 24', 42', 75'; Jone Macilai-Tori 69'; Kara Pryor 79'; Con: Daniel Hawkins (5/6) 16', 25', 43', 70', 76'; Pen: Daniel Hawkins (6/6) 31', 36', 50', 55', 60', 65'	Report	Try: Greg Pleasants-Tate 8'; Matt McGahan 39'; Robbie Robinson 45'; Leigh Thompson 72'; Con: Matt McGahan (1/3) 9'; Daniel Halangahu (1/1) 73'; Pen: Matt McGahan (1/1) 34'

Okara Park, Whangārei
Referee: Mike Fraser (New Zealand)

4 October 2014
14:35 NZST

Southland	10–24	Counties Manukau
Try: Bryan Milne 25'; Con: Scott Eade (1/1) 26'; Pen: Scott Eade (1/1) 58'	Report	Try: Onosai Auva'a 3'; Tim Nanai-Williams 50'; Augustine Pulu 66'; Jordan Taufua 69'; Con: Ahsee Tuala (2/4) 66', 70'; Cards: Pauliasi Manu (yellow card) 24'

Rugby Park Stadium, Invercargill
Referee: Brendon Pickerill (New Zealand)

4 October 2014
17:35 NZST

Bay of Plenty	33–16	Otago
Try: Daniel Hollinshead (2) 21', 59'; Joe Royal 28'; Byron McGuigan 34'; Leroy Van Dam 77'; Con: Daniel Hollinshead (4/5) 29', 34', 59', 78'	Report	Try: Aki Seiuli 39'; Con: Hayden Parker (1/1) 40'; Pen: Hayden Parker (3/3) 6', 42', 56'

Baypark Stadium, Tauranga
Referee: Kane McBride (New Zealand)

4 October 2014
19:35 NZST

Canterbury	10–38	Tasman
Try: Matt Todd 54'; Con: Richie Mo'unga (1/1) 55'; Pen: Richie Mo'unga (1/1) 5'	Report	Try: David Havili 23'; James Lowe (2) 31', 76'; Jimmy Cowan 51'; Marty Banks 75'; Con: Marty Banks (5/5) 24', 32', 52', 75', 77'; Pen: Marty Banks (1/1) 65'

Rugby League Park, Christchurch
Referee: Garratt Williamson (New Zealand)

5 October 2014
14:35 NZST

Manawatu	29–3	Hawke's Bay
Try: Michael Fitzgerald 9'; Nehe Milner-Skudder 19'; Hamish Northcott 66'; Callum Gibbins 69'; Con: Otere Black (2/2) 10', 20'; Aaron Cruden (1/2) 67'; Pen: Otere Black (1/2) 25'	Report	Pen: Ihaia West (1/1) 42'; Cards: Tony Lamborn (yellow card) 65'

Arena Manawatu, Palmerston North
Referee: Paul Williams (New Zealand)

5 October 2014
16:35 NZST

Wellington	22–38	Taranaki
Try: Matt Proctor (2) 1', 80'; Marvin Karawana 28'; Con: Willie Ripia (2/3) 2', 29'; Pen: Willie Ripia (1/1) 44'	Report	Try: Jamison Gibson-Park 13'; Waisake Naholo (2) 59', 71'; Chris Smylie 62'; Blade Thomson 65'; Con: Marty McKenzie (2/5) 63', 72'; Pen: Marty McKenzie (3/3) 5', 25', 58'; Cards: James Marshall (yellow card) 78'

Wellington Regional Stadium, Wellington
Attendance: 2,413
Referee: Brett Johnson (New Zealand)

=== Week 9 ===
8 October 2014
19:35 NZST

Counties Manukau	41–18	Auckland
Try: Penalty try 21'; Frank Halai (2) 39', 57'; Ahsee Tuala 50'; Augustine Pulu 64'; Sam Henwood 80'; Con: Ahsee Tuala (1/2) 22'; Tim Nanai-Williams (2/2) 51', 80'; Michael Stanley (1/2) 65'; Pen: Ahsee Tuala (1/1) 3'	Report	Try: Ofa Tu'ungafasi 8'; Jack Whetton 68'; Con: Gareth Anscombe (1/2) 69'; Pen: Gareth Anscombe (2/2) 44', 53'; Cards: Junior Poluleuligaga (yellow card) 21'

ECOLight Stadium, Pukekohe
Referee: Kane McBride (New Zealand)

9 October 2014
19:35 NZST

Waikato	29–12	Bay of Plenty
Try: Brad Weber 21'; Epalahame Faiva 52'; Declan O'Donnell 68'; Jordan Payne 79'; Con: Damian McKenzie (3/4) 22', 53', 69'; Pen: Damian McKenzie (1/2) 9'	Report	Try: Byron McGuigan (2) 25', 65'; Con: Daniel Hollinshead (1/2) 66'; Pen: Daniel Hollinshead (0/1)

Waikato Stadium, Hamilton
Referee: Garratt Williamson (New Zealand)

10 October 2014
19:35 NZST

Otago	25–38	Manawatu
Try: Joe Latta 4'; Fa'asiu Fuatai 50'; Sam Anderson-Heather 76'; Con: Peter Breen (1/1) 5'; Hayden Parker (1/2) 52'; Pen: Peter Breen (2/2) 20', 26'	Report	Try: Callum Gibbins 10'; Nathan Tudreu (2) 16', 24'; Rob Foreman 47'; Hamish Northcott 79'; Con: Otere Black (5/5) 11', 17', 25', 48', 80'; Pen: Otere Black (1/1) 58'

Forsyth Barr Stadium, Dunedin
Referee: Glen Jackson (New Zealand)

11 October 2014
14:35 NZST

Wellington	58–34	North Harbour
Try: Jackson Garden-Bachop 42'; Victor Vito 59'; Brad Shields 65'; Vaea Fifita 72'; Ross Filipo 76'; TJ Perenara 78'; Con: Willie Ripia (3/4) 43', 66', 73'; Ross Filipo (2/2) 77', 79'; Pen: Willie Ripia (6/6) 3', 18', 29', 35', 37', 63'	Report	Try: Pita Ahki 22'; Matt Vaega 26'; Raniera Takarangi 67'; Tevita Li 69'; Con: Matt McGahan (3/3) 23', 27', 68'; Daniel Halangahu (1/1) 70'; Pen: Matt McGahan (2/2) 7', 49'

Wellington Regional Stadium, Wellington
Attendance: 3,367
Referee: Jamie Nutbrown (New Zealand)

11 October 2014
17:35 NZST

RS – Hawke's Bay	20–20	Southland
Try: Shannan Chase (2) 36', 38'; Con: Ihaia West (2/2) 37', 39'; Pen: Ihaia West (1/2) 28'; Drop: Ihaia West 79'	Report	Try: Junior Ngaluafe 9'; Lima Sopoaga 30'; Con: Lima Sopoaga (2/2) 10', 31'; Pen: Lima Sopoaga (2/4) 62', 74'

McLean Park, Napier
Referee: Ben O'Keeffe (New Zealand)

11 October 2014
19:35 NZST

Auckland	38–10	Northland
Try: Gareth Anscombe 36'; Lolagi Visinia 60'; Tom McCartney 65'; Nepia Fox-Matamua 71'; Con: Gareth Anscombe (3/4) 37', 61', 73'; Pen: Gareth Anscombe (3/3) 8', 15', 18'; Lolagi Visinia (1/1) 23'; Cards: Gareth Anscombe (yellow card) 21'	Report	Try: WillGriff John 9'; Con: Daniel Hawkins (1/1) 10'; Pen: Daniel Hawkins (1/1) 22'

Eden Park, Auckland
Attendance: 3,900
Referee: Brendon Pickerill (New Zealand)

12 October 2014
14:35 NZST

Taranaki	23–26	Canterbury
Try: Seta Tamanivalu 9'; Codey Rei 31'; Waisake Naholo 57'; Con: Marty McKenzie (1/3) 32'; Pen: Marty McKenzie (1/2) 2'; Codey Rei (1/1) 5'; Cards: Waisake Naholo (yellow card) 61'	Report	Try: Matt Todd 68'; Johnny McNicholl 69'; Con: Tom Taylor (2/2) 69', 70'; Pen: Tom Taylor (4/4) 24', 29', 42', 75'

Yarrow Stadium, New Plymouth
Referee: Mike Fraser (New Zealand)

12 October 2014
16:35 NZST

Tasman	16–21	Counties Manukau
Try: Robbie Malneek 46'; Con: Marty Banks (1/1) 47'; Pen: Rohan Saifoloi (3/3) 5', 22', 24'	Report	Try: Pauliasi Manu 27'; Michael Stanley 59'; Jordan Taufua 67'; Con: Ahsee Tuala (1/1) 27'; Michael Stanley (2/2) 60', 68'

Lansdowne Park, Blenheim
Referee: Shane McDermott (New Zealand)

== Play-offs ==
Championship

Semi-finals
1	Manawatu	23
4	Southland	18
2	Hawke's Bay	26
3	Northland	21

Final
1	Manawatu	32
2	Hawke's Bay	24

Premiership

Semi-finals
1	Taranaki	49
4	Auckland	30
2	Tasman	26
3	Canterbury	6

Final
1	Taranaki	36
2	Tasman	32

=== Semi-finals ===
==== Championship ====
17 October 2014
19:35 NZST

Hawke's Bay	26–21	Northland
Try: Buckman 31' c Fruean 46' c Con: West (2/2) 32', 47'; Pen: West (4/4) 7', 15', 54', 65'	Report	Try: Macilai-Tori 27' m Pryor 57' m Waa 75' m Con: Hawkins (0/3); Pen: Hawkins (2/2) 5', 51'

McLean Park, Napier
Referee: Shane McDermott (New Zealand)

18 October 2014
14:05 NZST

Manawatu	23–18	Southland
Try: Milner-Skudder 15' c Gibbins 48' c Con: Black (2/2) 16', 49'; Pen: Black (3/4) 9', 35', 44'	Report	Try: Dixon 52' c Kahukura 77' m Con: Sopoaga (1/2) 53'; Pen: Sopoaga (2/2) 18', 42'

Arena Manawatu, Palmerston North
Referee: Ben O'Keeffe (New Zealand)

==== Premiership ====
18 October 2014
16:35 NZST

Taranaki	49–30 (a.e.t.)	Auckland
Try: R. Marshall 4' c Crosswell 7' c J. Marshall 28' c Naholo 81' c Thomson 84' m Ormond 90' c Con: Rei (3/3) 5', 8', 29'; McKenzie (2/3) 82', 91'; Pen: Rei (3/5) 34', 50', 71'; McKenzie (0/1)	Report	Try: Anscombe 9' c Moala (2) 19' c, 64' c Con: Anscombe (3/3) 10', 20', 65'; Pen: Anscombe (3/5) 13', 22', 33'

Yarrow Stadium, New Plymouth
Referee: Mike Fraser (New Zealand)

18 October 2014
19:05 NZST

Tasman	26–6	Canterbury
Try: Lowe 2' c Cowan 39' c Con: Banks (2/2) 3', 40'; Pen: Banks (4/7) 32', 44', 56', 71'	Report	Pen: Taylor (2/2) 28', 35'

Trafalgar Park, Nelson
Referee: Nick Briant (New Zealand)

=== Finals ===
==== Championship ====
24 October 2014
19:35 NZST

Manawatu	32–24	Hawke's Bay
Try: Hammington 43' c Milner-Skudder 54' c Emery 75' c Tudreu 79' m Con: Black (2/2) 44', 55'; Te Rure (1/1) 76'; Crosswell (0/1); Pen: Black (2/3) 11', 32'	Report	Try: West 15' c Chase (2) 24' c, 66' c Con: West (3/3) 16', 25', 68'; Pen: West (1/2) 50'

Arena Manawatu, Palmerston North
Referee: Garratt Williamson (New Zealand)

==== Premiership ====
25 October 2014
19:35 NZST

Taranaki	36–32	Tasman
Try: R. Marshall 31' c Ngatai (2) 42' c, 54' c Con: Rei (3/3) 32', 43', 55'; Pen: Rei (5/5) 4', 7', 39', 57', 74'	Report	Try: Fonotia 18' c Guyton (2) 64' c, 79' m Samu 72' c Con: Banks (3/4) 19', 65', 72'; Pen: Banks (2/5) 38', 47'

Yarrow Stadium, New Plymouth
Referee: Glen Jackson (New Zealand)

FB	15	James Marshall (c)
RW	14	Codey Rei
OC	13	Seta Tamanivalu
IC	12	Charlie Ngatai	(substituted off) 56'
LW	11	Waisake Naholo	(substituted off) 74'
FH	10	Marty McKenzie
SH	9	Chris Smylie	(substituted off) 62'
N8	8	Iopu Iopu-Aso	(substituted off) 15'
OF	7	Bernie Hall
BF	6	Mitchell Crosswell
RL	5	James Broadhurst
LL	4	Riki Hoeata	(substituted off) 66'
TP	3	Angus Ta'avao	(substituted off) 71'
HK	2	Rhys Marshall
LP	1	Mitchell Graham	(substituted off) 56'	(substituted on) 73'
Replacements:
PR	16	Sione Lea	(substituted on) 56'	(substituted off) 73'
PR	17	Ryan Cocker	(substituted on) 71'
N8	18	Mitchell Brown	(substituted on) 15'
LK	19	Leighton Price	(substituted on) 66'
SH	20	Jamison Gibson-Park	(substituted on) 62'
WG	21	Jackson Ormond	(substituted on) 74'
FB	22	Kurt Baker	(substituted on) 56'

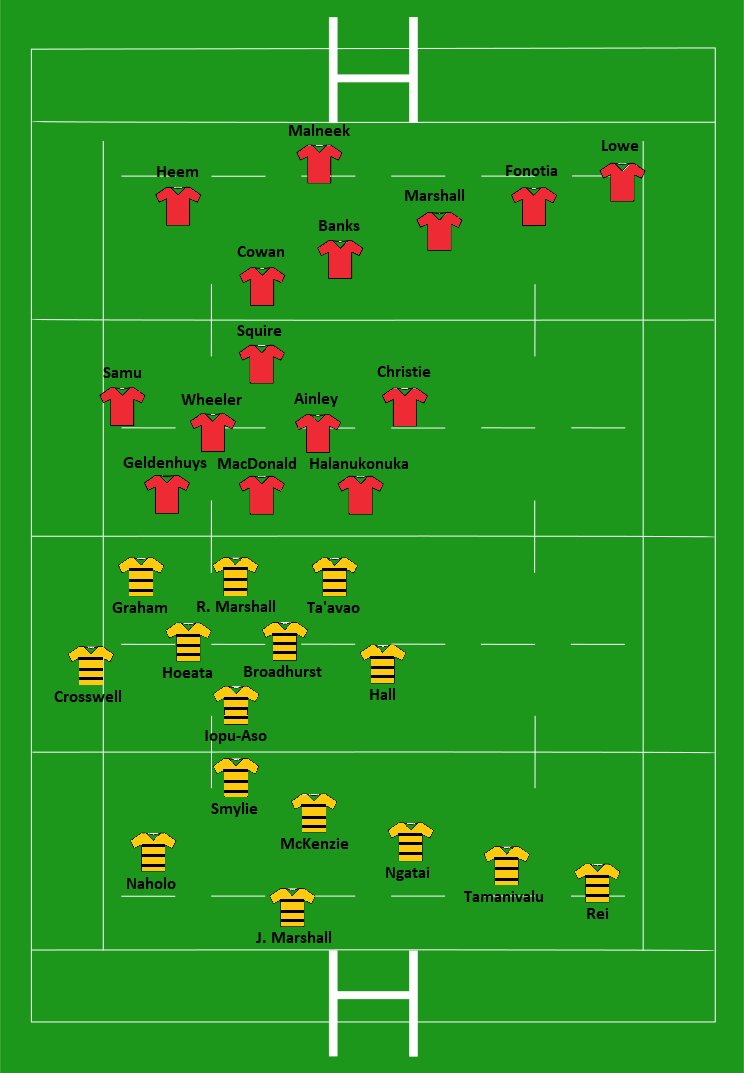

FB	15	Robbie Malneek			(substituted off) 70'
RW	14	Bryce Heem	(substituted off) 66'
OC	13	Kieron Fonotia
IC	12	Tom Marshall (c)	(substituted off) 58'	(substituted on) 60'
LW	11	James Lowe
FH	10	Marty Banks
SH	9	Jimmy Cowan	(substituted off) 33'	(substituted on) 41'	(substituted off) 44'
N8	8	Liam Squire
OF	7	Shane Christie
BF	6	Pete Samu
RL	5	Joe Wheeler	(substituted off) 58'
LL	4	Alex Ainley
TP	3	Ross Geldenhuys
HK	2	Quentin MacDonald
LP	1	Siua Halanukonuka	(substituted off) 73'
Replacements:
HK	16	Jesse MacDonald
PR	17	Reuben Northover	(substituted on) 73'
LK	18	Tevita Cavubati	(substituted on) 58'
FL	19	Vernon Fredericks
SH	20	Billy Guyton	(substituted on) 33'	(substituted off) 41'	(substituted on) 44'
FB	21	David Havili	(substituted on) 58'	(substituted off) 60'	(substituted on) 70'
WG	22	Mitchell Scott	(substituted on) 66'

== Statistics ==
=== Leading point scorers ===
No.	Player	Team	Points	Average	Details
1	Marty Banks	Tasman	175	14.58	3 T, 38 C, 28 P, 0 D
2	Gareth Anscombe	Auckland	152	13.82	5 T, 17 C, 31 P, 0 D
3	Daniel Hawkins	Northland	129	11.73	0 T, 21 C, 29 P, 0 D
4	Ihaia West	Hawke's Bay	125	10.42	3 T, 22 C, 20 P, 2 D
5	Marty McKenzie	Taranaki	125	10.42	5 T, 23 C, 16 P, 2 D
6	Otere Black	Manawatu	118	10.73	1 T, 19 C, 25 P, 0 D
7	Hayden Parker	Otago	112	11.20	2 T, 18 C, 22 P, 0 D
8	Lima Sopoaga	Southland	109	10.90	1 T, 19 C, 22 P, 0 D
9	Damian McKenzie	Waikato	90	9.00	2 T, 16 C, 16 P, 0 D
10	Matt McGahan	North Harbour	79	7.90	3 T, 14 C, 12 P, 0 D

Source: The weekly reviews of the matches published on provincial.rugby (see "Report" in the individual match scoring stats).

=== Leading try scorers ===
No.	Player	Team	Tries	Average
1	Ryan Tongia	Hawke's Bay	10	0.83
2	Waisake Naholo	Taranaki	9	0.75
3	James Lowe	Tasman	8	0.67
4	Joe Webber	Waikato	8	0.89
5	Augustine Pulu	Counties Manukau	7	0.70
6	Blade Thomson	Taranaki	7	0.64
7	Seta Tamanivalu	Taranaki	7	0.58
8	Brendon O'Connor	Hawke's Bay	6	0.67
9	George Moala	Auckland	6	0.60
10	Jimmy Cowan	Tasman	5	0.42

Source: The weekly reviews of the matches published on provincial.rugby (see "Report" in the individual match scoring stats).

=== Points by week ===
Team	1		2		3		4		5		6		7		8		9		Total		Average	
Auckland	9	48	35	7	16	16	31	30	27	12	32	7	22	35	60	19	56	51	288	225	28.80	22.50
Bay of Plenty	23	34	27	56	3	41	48	43	12	27	17	36	27	30	33	16	12	29	202	312	20.20	31.20
Canterbury	48	9	58	27	48	3	23	16	46	12	28	20	50	57	10	38	26	23	337	205	33.70	20.50
Counties Manukau	9	9	29	25	21	27	10	26	21	26	20	28	55	7	24	10	62	34	251	192	25.10	19.20
Hawke's Bay	15	35	29	26	27	21	21	23	41	0	36	17	25	28	39	43	20	20	253	213	25.30	21.30
Manawatu	28	23	7	35	27	21	55	37	13	24	41	20	22	20	29	3	38	25	260	208	26.00	20.80
North Harbour	14	28	21	25	16	22	14	21	24	13	7	32	57	49	27	58	34	58	214	306	21.40	30.60
Northland	23	28	35	5	3	48	23	21	74	59	20	31	30	27	58	27	10	38	276	284	27.60	28.40
Otago	28	14	25	29	33	22	16	23	23	81	38	7	24	32	16	33	25	38	228	279	22.80	27.90
Southland	34	23	25	21	22	33	19	41	36	34	34	79	28	26	10	24	20	20	228	301	22.80	30.10
Taranaki	9	9	26	29	87	20	41	19	31	30	31	20	35	22	38	22	23	26	321	197	32.10	19.70
Tasman	35	15	56	27	16	16	23	16	30	31	80	34	32	24	38	10	16	21	326	194	32.60	19.40
Waikato	37	25	27	58	39	62	16	23	26	21	7	38	20	22	19	60	29	12	220	321	22.00	32.10
Wellington	25	37	5	35	21	27	30	31	12	46	20	42	7	55	36	74	58	34	214	381	21.40	38.10

Source: ITM Cup Fixtures and Results 2014

=== Tries by week ===
Team	1		2		3		4		5		6		7		8		9		Total		Average	
Auckland	0	6	4	1	1	1	3	3	2	2	4	1	1	4	9	3	6	7	30	28	3.00	2.80
Bay of Plenty	2	3	4	7	0	6	6	5	2	2	2	5	3	3	5	1	2	4	26	36	2.60	3.60
Canterbury	6	0	8	2	6	0	2	1	7	2	3	2	5	7	1	5	2	3	40	22	4.00	2.20
Counties Manukau	0	0	4	3	2	4	1	2	3	4	2	3	7	1	4	1	9	3	32	21	3.20	2.10
Hawke's Bay	2	4	3	2	4	2	2	2	6	0	5	2	3	3	5	5	1	2	31	22	3.10	2.20
Manawatu	3	2	1	4	2	2	5	5	1	2	5	2	1	1	4	0	5	3	27	21	2.70	2.10
North Harbour	2	3	2	1	1	1	2	2	2	1	1	4	7	6	4	6	4	6	25	30	2.50	3.00
Northland	2	3	5	1	0	6	2	2	8	7	2	4	3	3	6	4	1	4	29	34	2.90	3.40
Otago	3	2	3	4	3	3	1	2	2	11	4	1	3	4	1	5	3	5	23	37	2.30	3.70
Southland	3	2	1	2	3	3	3	6	5	3	4	10	3	2	1	4	2	1	25	33	2.50	3.30
Taranaki	0	0	2	3	12	2	6	3	3	3	4	2	4	1	5	3	3	2	39	19	3.90	1.90
Tasman	4	2	7	4	1	1	2	1	3	3	10	4	4	3	5	1	1	3	37	22	3.70	2.20
Waikato	6	3	3	8	3	7	1	2	4	3	1	4	1	1	3	9	4	2	26	39	2.60	3.90
Wellington	3	6	1	5	2	2	3	3	2	7	2	5	1	7	4	10	6	4	24	49	2.40	4.90

For	Against

Source: The weekly reviews of the matches published on provincial.rugby (see "Report" in the individual match scoring stats).

=== Sanctions ===
Player	Team	Red	Yellow	Sent off match(es)
Maritino Nemani	Bay of Plenty	1	0	vs Hawke's Bay
Daniel Hawkins	Northland	0	2	vs Manawatu and Otago
Elliot Dixon	Southland	0	2	vs Otago and Manawatu
Peter Saili	Auckland	0	1	vs Canterbury
Hubert Buydens	Manawatu	0	1	vs Auckland
Kayne Hammington	Manawatu	0	1	vs Auckland
Tom Franklin	Otago	0	1	vs Southland
Ben Tameifuna	Waikato	0	1	vs North Harbour
Siaosi Iongi	Bay of Plenty	0	1	vs Taranaki
Geoffrey Cridge	Hawke's Bay	0	1	vs Northland
Brad Shields	Wellington	0	1	vs Auckland
Joel Everson	Canterbury	0	1	vs Wellington
Matt Proctor	Wellington	0	1	vs Canterbury
Whiria Meltzer	Northland	0	1	vs Southland
Loni Uhila	Waikato	0	1	vs Counties Manukau
Jimmy Cowan	Tasman	0	1	vs Southland
Jone Macilai-Tori	Northland	0	1	vs Taranaki
Sikeli Nabou	Counties Manukau	0	1	vs Canterbury
Culum Retallick	Bay of Plenty	0	1	vs Hawke's Bay
Michael Fitzgerald	Manawatu	0	1	vs Waikato
Josh Hohneck	Waikato	0	1	vs Manawatu
Ma'ama Vaipulu	Counties Manukau	0	1	vs Wellington
Ryan Tongia	Hawke's Bay	0	1	vs North Harbour
Vaea Fifita	Wellington	0	1	vs Hawke's Bay
Pauliasi Manu	Counties Manukau	0	1	vs Southland
Tony Lamborn	Hawke's Bay	0	1	vs Manawatu
James Marshall	Taranaki	0	1	vs Wellington
Junior Poluleuligaga	Auckland	0	1	vs Counties Manukau
Gareth Anscombe	Auckland	0	1	vs Northland
Waisake Naholo	Taranaki	0	1	vs Canterbury

== Ranfurly Shield ==
=== Pre-season challenges ===
2 July 2014
14:35 NZST

Counties Manukau	68–0	Thames Valley
Try: Hancy 7' c Page (3) 22' m, 34' m, 80' m Vaipulu (2) 28' m, 42' c Pulu 31' c Penalty try 50' c Ropati 55' c Graham 71' c Con: Page (6/10) 8', 32', 43', 51', 56', 72'; Pen: Page (2/2) 20', 24'	Report	Pen: Harrison (0/1)

ECOLight Stadium, Pukekohe
Attendance: 5,000
Referee: Kane McBride (New Zealand)

9 July 2014
18:00 NZST

Counties Manukau	46–10	Mid Canterbury
Try: Hyatt (2) 1' c, 5' c Page 15' m Vaipulu 44' c Tu'ungafasi 50' c Pulu 57' m Muirhead 61' m Con: Page (4/7) 2', 5', 45', 51'; Pen: Page (1/1) 28'	Preview; Report	Try: Sharpe 32' c Con: Williams (1/1) 33'; Drop: Williams (1/1) 38'

ECOLight Stadium, Pukekohe
Attendance: 6,000
Referee: Shane McDermott (New Zealand)

== See also ==
- 2014 Heartland Championship
