= Hammington =

Hammington is a surname. Notable people with the surname include:

- Kayne Hammington (born 1990), New Zealand rugby player
- Sam Hammington (born 1977), New Zealand-born Australian comedian
