= Namatahi Waa =

New Zealand rugby union player

- Born: 24 September 1990 (age 36)
- Height: 1.88 m (6 ft 2 in)
- Weight: 119 kg (18 st 10 lb; 262 lb)
- School: Te Aute College
- Occupation: Rugby player / Arborist

Rugby union career
- Position: Prop
- Current team: Hawke's Bay, Austin Gilgronis
Senior career
Years	Team	Apps	(Points)
2014−2017	Northland	29	(10)
2016	Blues	3	(0)
2019−	Hawke's Bay	21	(10)
2022	Austin Gilgronis	10	(5)
- Correct as of 6 June 2022

Namatahi Waa (born 24 September 1990) is a New Zealand rugby union player, who currently plays as a prop for Hawke's Bay in New Zealand's National Provincial Championship competition and previously for Austin Gilgronis in the Major League Rugby (MLR).

== Early career ==
Waa hails from Pipiwai in the Northland Region in New Zealand. For his final years of high school (2008-2010) he attended Te Aute College in Hawke's Bay; while there, he played for the college's First XV. He also played for the Hawke's Bay under-18 and under-19 representative teams.

After finishing secondary school, Waa returned home to Northland, but later moved to Auckland where he was named in the Auckland Juniors (U21) squad in 2012 and Auckland B squad in 2013.

In February 2014, he was - for the first time - named in the Blues Development squad.

== Senior career ==
In 2014, Waa turned down a contract with Auckland and instead signed with the Northland Rugby Union for the 2014 ITM Cup season. He made his provincial debut for Northland on 17 August 2014 against Manawatu. In that and the following three seasons, he played a total of 29 games for the Taniwha.

On 28 October 2015, Waa was named in the Blues wider training group ahead of the 2016 Super Rugby season. He made his Blues and Super Rugby debut, off the bench, on 8 April 2015 against the Chiefs. He played two more games for the Blues.

In 2019, Waa returned to Hawke's Bay and played for Taradale Rugby and Sports in the province's club rugby competition, hoping to make the Magpies squad. On 5 August 2019, he was named in the Hawke's Bay squad for the 2019 Mitre 10 Cup season. He made his Magpies debut against Manawatu on 11 August 2019.

== International ==
In 2016, Waa - who is of Ngāpuhi descent - was called into the Māori All Blacks squad for their Northern tour to Chicago, Limerick and London as an injury replacement for Mike Kainga, but didn't get named in the teams to play the United States, Munster and Harlequins.
