= Murphy Taramai =

- Full name: Murphy Vaiaoga Utuariki Taramai
- Born: 17 August 1992 (age 34) Lower Hutt, New Zealand
- Height: 187 cm (6 ft 2 in)
- Weight: 105 kg (231 lb)
- School: Upper Hutt College

Rugby union career
- Position(s): No.8, Flanker, Centre
- Current team: Upper Hutt Rams
Senior career
Years	Team	Apps	(Points)
2014	Wellington	1	(0)
2016–2018 2025–	North Harbour	57	(20)
2017–2018	Blues	19	(5)
2019	Glendale Raptors	7	(0)
2020–2021	Hurricanes	1	(0)
2021–2025	Shimizu Blue Sharks	43	(45)
- Correct as of 4 October 2025
International career
Years	Team	Apps	(Points)
2024–	Samoa	3	
National sevens team
Years	Team		Comps
2014–2015	New Zealand		4
- Correct as of 13 October 2019

Murphy Vaiaoga Utuariki Taramai (born 17 August 1992) is a New Zealand rugby union player, of Cook Islands and Samoan heritage, who currently plays as a loose forward for North Harbour in New Zealand's domestic Mitre 10 Cup and for the Blues in the international Super Rugby competition. He previously represented the All Blacks Sevens team during the 2014–15 Sevens World Series.

== Youth career ==
Taramai was initially a professional rugby league footballer of some pedigree during his days attending Upper Hutt College just outside of Wellington. His side remained 3 years unbeaten with Taramai playing a key role in the side. This form earned him a trial with NRL side, the Penrith Panthers in 2011. Unfortunately for him, things didn't work out as well as expected in Australia and he returned home to New Zealand in 2012 and turned his attention to rugby sevens.

== Domestic Sevens career ==
Upon returning to New Zealand in 2012 he began playing sevens rugby with Wellington and was a member of the side which lifted the national title in 2014.

== Senior career ==
Taramai played one game for Wellington during their largely chaotic and ill-fated campaign in 2014. Unable to earn a contract in 2015, he headed north to join up with North Harbour where he enjoyed a memorable debut season in 2016. He started all 12 matches as Harbour lifted the Mitre 10 Cup Championship and earned promotion to the Premiership ahead of the 2017 season.

== Super Rugby ==
Taramai's immediate impact at Mitre 10 Cup level with North Harbour saw him swiftly receive attention from Auckland-based Super Rugby franchise, the Blues, and he was named as a member of their squad for the 2017 Super Rugby season.

== International ==
Taramai represented New Zealand at sevens level between 2014 and 2015, appearing at 4 tournaments in which he played 19 matches and scored 1 try.

== Career honours ==
North Harbour

- Mitre 10 Cup Championship – 2016
