= Sekonaia Pole =

NZ rugby union player (born 1995)

- Born: 2 April 1995 (age 31)
- Height: 180 cm (5 ft 11 in)
- Weight: 112 kg (247 lb)

Rugby union career
- Position(s): Hooker, Prop
Senior career
Years	Team	Apps	(Points)
2020–	NTT Communications Shining Arcs	54	(15)
Provincial / State sides
Years	Team	Apps	(Points)
2015–19	Otago	49	(10)
Super Rugby
Years	Team	Apps	(Points)
2017	Highlanders	3	(0)

Sekonaia Pole (born 2 April 1995) is a New Zealand professional rugby union player.

== Biography ==
Pole was an Otago Boys' High School first XV captain.

A hooker, Pole competed for Otago from 2015 to 2019. He made three appearances off the bench for the Highlanders in the 2017 Super Rugby season. Since 2020, Pole has played his rugby in Japan with the Urayasu D-Rocks.

Pole is a cousin of Otago prop Abraham Pole.
