= Tom Franklin (rugby union) =

New Zealand rugby union player

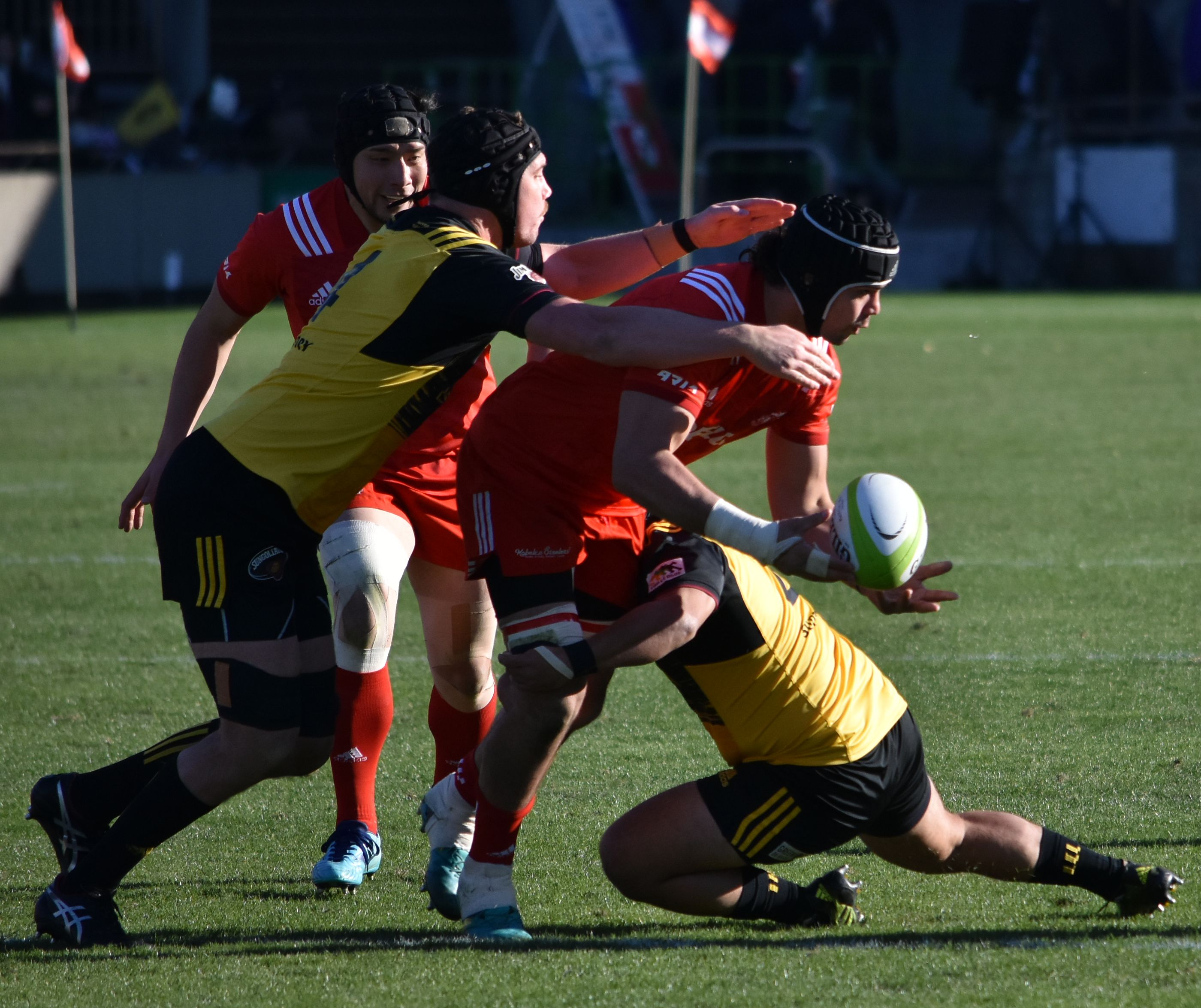
- Franklin in 2018
- Full name: Thomas St George Franklin
- Born: 11 August 1990 (age 36) Ōpōtiki, New Zealand
- Height: 2.00 m (6 ft 7 in)
- Weight: 115 kg (18 st 2 lb; 254 lb)
- School: St. Paul's Collegiate School
- University: University of Otago

Rugby union career
- Position(s): Lock, Flanker
- Current team: Taranaki, Force
Senior career
Years	Team	Apps	(Points)
2011–2016	Otago	51	(50)
2014–2019	Highlanders	85	(25)
2017–2019	Bay of Plenty	16	(15)
2018–2022	Kobelco Steelers	25	(35)
2021, 2023	San Diego Legion	13	(0)
2023–2024	Taranaki	11	(15)
2024	Force	9	(5)
- Correct as of 1 June 2024
International career
Years	Team	Apps	(Points)
2010	New Zealand U20	5	(0)
2014–2019	Māori All Blacks	9	(5)
- Correct as of 2 June 2021

Tom Franklin (born 11 August 1990) is a New Zealand rugby union player who currently plays as a lock for Taranaki in New Zealand's domestic National Provincial Championship competition and the Western Force in Super Rugby.

== Early career ==
Born in the small town of Ōpōtiki in New Zealand's Bay of Plenty Region, Franklin attended high school at St Paul's Collegiate School in Hamilton. After graduation, he turned down a scholarship at Lincoln University in Christchurch in favour of a move to Dunedin to study business management at the University of Otago. While working towards his degree, he began playing for Southern in the local Dunedin club rugby competition and also was a member of the Otago rugby academy.

== Senior career ==
Franklin first played provincial rugby with Otago in 2011, debuting in a 30–14 win over Counties Manukau, one of two appearances he made during the year. He was far more of a regular in 2012, playing 8 times and scoring his first provincial try for the Razorbacks as they came second in the ITM Cup Championship standings and reached the promotion playoff final before being thrashed 41–16 by Counties Manukau. He played 10 times in both the 2013 and 2014 seasons as Otago finished in 2nd and 6th place on the log respectively, still unable to gain promotion to the Premiership.

After a poor year in 2014, the Razorbacks started to turn the corner in 2015, winning 6 of their 10 regular season matches they finished 3rd on the Championship log behind Wellington and Hawke's Bay before being defeated 34–14 by the Lions in the semi-finals. Franklin scored 1 try in 8 matches during the season and the following year added 3 more 5 pointers in 9 games as the men from Dunedin topped the Championship log and went on to reach the playoff final where they were surprisingly bettered by North Harbour, going down 17–14 at home, a defeat which consigned them to yet another season of Championship rugby in 2017.

== Super Rugby ==
Several seasons of solid performances at domestic level with Otago brought him to the attention of Dunedin-based Super Rugby franchise, the Highlanders, who named him in their squad for the 2014 Super Rugby season. Competing for a starting slot against the likes of Joe Wheeler, Josh Bekhuis, Brad Thorn and Jarrad Hoeata, Franklin did well to feature in 8 games in his first season, starting 3 times and coming on as a replacement 5 times.

The Highlanders reached the quarter-finals in 2014 before being knocked out by the Sharks in Durban, but the following year they enjoyed a dream season and lifted the Super Rugby title for the first time in their history, defeating the Hurricanes 21–14 in the final. Franklin played in 15 of the Highlanders 19 games in 2015 and went on to play the same number of times in 2016 as they failed to hold on to their crown, losing to the Lions in Johannesburg in the semi-finals.

On 5 April 2018, the Highlanders announced that Franklin had signed a 2-year deal with Japanese club Kobelco Steelers. He came back for one more season with the Highlanders in 2019 and played a total of 85 games for the franchise.

However, that wasn't the end of his Super Rugby career. On 11 January 2024, the Western Force announced the signing of Franklin for the 2024 Super Rugby Pacific season.

== International career ==
Franklin was a member of the New Zealand Under-20 side which won the 2010 Junior World Championship in Argentina, playing 5 times.

He has also represented the Māori All Blacks, receiving his first call up to their squad ahead of the 2014 end-of-year rugby union internationals. He started both matches on their tour, victories over Japan in Kobe and Tokyo, playing the full 80 minutes in a 61–21 win in the first test, before being yellow carded and then substituted by Hayden Triggs in a narrow 20-18 success in the second test.

After a gap of 2 years, he was once again in a Māori shirt for the 2016 end-of-year rugby union internationals and played in the victories over the United States and Harlequins.

Franklin was named as injury cover for Sam Whitelock in the All Blacks squad ahead of the 2016 mid-year rugby union internationals series against Ireland. Whitelock missed the first test but recovered enough to play in the remaining two matches so Franklin was withdrawn from the squad and is still awaiting his senior test debut. He was also part of the All Blacks squad named to train for the 2017 Rugby Championship.

== Honours ==
New Zealand Under-20

- IRB Junior World Championship – 2010

Highlanders

- Super Rugby – 2015

Taranaki

- National Provincial Championship – 2023

== Super Rugby statistics ==
As of 11 January 2017

Season	Team	Games	Starts	Sub	Mins	Tries	Cons	Pens	Drops	Points	Yel	Red
2014	Highlanders	8	3	5	426	0	0	0	0	0	0	0
2015	Highlanders	15	11	4	794	1	0	0	0	5	0	0
2016	Highlanders	15	13	2	879	0	0	0	0	0	0	0
Total		38	27	11	2099	1	0	0	0	5	0	0
