= Jone Macilai-Tori =

Fijian rugby union player

Jone Macilai
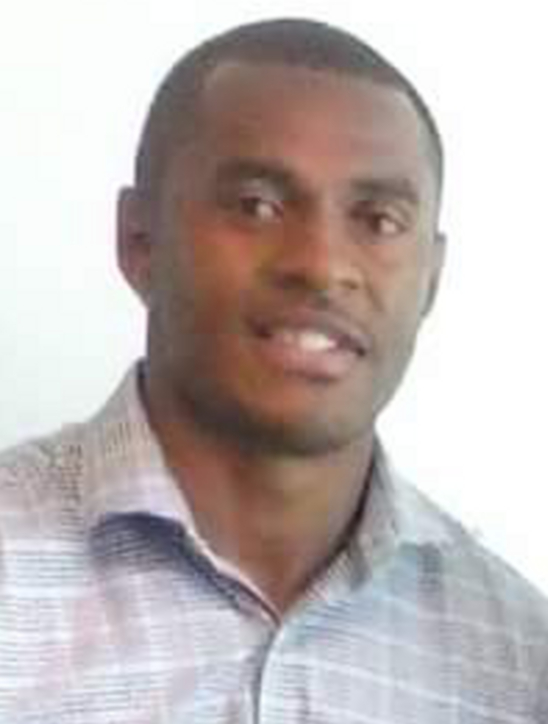
- Born: Jone Macilai-Tori; 27 August 1990 (age 36) Suva, Fiji
- Height: 1.78 m (5 ft 10 in)
- Weight: 97 kg (15 st 4 lb)

Rugby union career
- Position: Wing
Senior career
Years	Team	Apps	(Points)
2020	Munakata Sanix Blues	3	(10)
Provincial / State sides
Years	Team	Apps	(Points)
2014–2022	Northland	59	(112)
- Correct as of 8 October 2022
Super Rugby
Years	Team	Apps	(Points)
2015–2018	Crusaders	16	(35)
2021	Blues	0	(0)
- Correct as of 23 August 2021

Jone Macilai-Tori (born 27 August 1990 in Suva, Fiji), is a professional rugby union player. He has previously played for the Crusaders. Macilai plays as a winger.

== Career ==
Macilai was spotted by local sevens coach Lote Rasiga and was included in the Red Rock sevens squad. He was later spotted by Awanui Rugby Club coach Glen Subritzky playing sevens at Coral Coast sevens tournament in Fiji in 2012 who included him in his squad. His performance for Awanui saw him selected for Northland in 2013 alongside the returning Rupeni Caucau. He missed most of the games in the season due to a dislocated elbow.

A strong 2014 ITM Cup saw him receive Super Rugby offers from the Blues, Highlanders and Crusaders. He signed with the Crusaders and partnered with block busting Fijian winger, Nemani Nadolo.

A broken arm in pre season meant he was out injured for 3 months. He made his debut off the bench on 8 May scoring a try on debut against the Reds.

He mainly played as a backup winger for the Crusaders in the 2016 Super Rugby season behind Nemani Nadolo, Johnny McNicholl and David Havili but a few injuries in the backline to Ryan Crotty and McNicholl saw him start a few games. He started against the Brumbies in Round 8 and scored a try set up by Matt Todd. In Round 10, he started on the left wing due to Nadolo being given a 4-week ban and scored three tries, two of which were set up by Israel Dagg and he also set up a try for Scott Barrett as well. He also charged down a conversion successfully of Red's flyhalf Jake McIntyre which is a rarity in rugby.
