= Otere Black =

NZ rugby union player (born 1995)

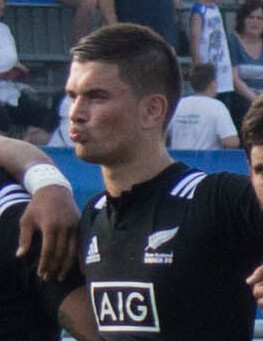
- Full name: Otere William Black
- Born: 4 May 1995 (age 31) Palmerston North, New Zealand
- Height: 185 cm (6 ft 1 in)
- Weight: 86 kg (190 lb; 13 st 8 lb)
- School: Hato Paora College

Rugby union career
- Position: Fly-Half / Centre / Fullback
- Current team: Urayasu D-Rocks
Senior career
Years	Team	Apps	(Points)
2014–2019	Manawatu	56	(444)
2015–2017	Hurricanes	22	(54)
2019–2021	Blues	40	(299)
2020–2021	Bay of Plenty	13	(58)
2022–	Urayasu D-Rocks	65	(373)
- Correct as of 23 March 2023
International career
Years	Team	Apps	(Points)
2015	New Zealand U20	5	(63)
2015–2021	Māori All Blacks	12	(56)
- Correct as of 3 October 2021

Otere Black (born 4 May 1995) is a New Zealand rugby union player who once played as a first five-eighth for Bay of Plenty in the Mitre 10 Cup and the Blues in Super Rugby.

== Domestic career ==
=== Manawatu ===
Black attended Hato Paora College for four years before moving on to Tū Toa where he graduated in 2013. He subsequently linked up with the local College Old Boys club. After scoring an impressive 223 points in sixteen games, he was promoted to the Manawatu Turbos ITM Cup side for 2014. His debut campaign with the Turbos was successful for both him and his team. Manawatu finished their season top of the ITM Cup Championship division and were promoted to the Premiership for 2015 following a play-off victory over Hawke's Bay.

=== Hurricanes ===
Black was part of the Hurricanes' wider training group in 2015, but got a chance to make his Super Rugby debut after a knee injury sidelined incumbent number ten Beauden Barrett. He made four appearances for the Hurricanes, scoring 17 points, and impressing with his composure and general ability to run the game plan, particularly against the Blues at Eden Park.

With three other New Zealand Super Rugby clubs chasing his services for the 2016 Super Rugby season, Black decided to re-sign and continue developing his game under the Hurricanes coaching staff.

=== Blues ===
It was announced towards the end of the 2017 Super Rugby season that Black would move up north, signing to play for the Blues. After missing the 2018 Super Rugby season through injury Black made his debut for the franchise in the opening match of the 2019 Super Rugby season. He scored five points in a 22-24 loss to the Crusaders .

== International career ==
=== Māori All Blacks ===
Although the then 20-year-old Black had only played eleven matches for Manawatu, Colin Cooper, the Māori All Blacks coach, selected him for the 2015 tour to Fiji, playing against the Fiji national team, and against a specially made New Zealand Barbarians team.

== Personal life ==
Black is a New Zealander of Māori descent (Ngai Tuhoe, Te Whanau a Apanui and Ngati Tuwharetoa descent).

== Honours ==
- Manawatu - 2014 ITM Cup Championship Division
- Hurricanes - 2016 Super Rugby
- Blues - 2021 Super Rugby Trans-Tasman
