= Ahsee Tuala =

Samoa international rugby union player

- Born: 23 August 1989 (age 37) Moto'otua, Samoa
- Height: 1.91 m (6 ft 3 in)
- Weight: 95 kg (14 st 13 lb; 209 lb)
- School: James Cook High School

Rugby union career
- Position: Fullback/Wing
Senior career
Years	Team	Apps	(Points)
2014–	Northampton Saints	140	(145)
- Correct as of 5 June 2022
Provincial / State sides
Years	Team	Apps	(Points)
2009–14	Counties Manukau	51	(166)
International career
Years	Team	Apps	(Points)
2014–	Samoa	24	(50)
- Correct as of 14 July 2022

Ahsee Tuala (born 23 August 1989) is a Samoan rugby union player who plays as a fullback for Aviva Premiership side Northampton Saints.

== Early career ==
Tuala was born in Samoa, but moved to New Zealand with his family aged 2 years old and grew up in South Auckland.

== Club career ==
Tuala began his senior rugby career in New Zealand with the Counties Manukau Steelers, debuting during the 2009 Air New Zealand Cup season while only 20 years old. His ability to play in several positions across the backline saw him become an integral part of the Steelers squad and earn over 50 ITM Cup caps. He was also involved in the Chiefs Development squads in both 2010 and 2011.

On 3 February 2015, Tuala signed for English club Northampton Saints in the Aviva Premiership until the end of the 2014-15 season. However, he signed a new deal with Northampton, making his move permanent at Franklin's Gardens.

It could be said that while Tuala has been at Saints for two season now, his breakthrough year was this past season (2016/17). The full back secured his place within the starting lineup on a weekly basis while George North was away on international duty and retained that on the wing's return, crossing the whitewash five times that season for Saints.

Teaming up with the rest of Saints' backline to form a formidable force when firing, Tuala was awarded Saints' Supporter' Breakthrough Player of the Year award at the 2016/17 End of Season Awards, pipping newcomers Nic Groom and Juan Pablo Estelles to the post.

Most recently Tuala helped Saints secure a place in European Rugby Champions Cup, scoring the match winning try as Saints beat Stade Français Paris by one point to clinch the final top-tier European spot.

== International career ==
Despite being born in Samoa, Tuala's early international experience came with New Zealand.

He was a member of the New Zealand Under-20 wider squad in 2009 and the New Zealand sevens wider training group in 2012.

However, in January 2012 it was announced that Tuala had withdrawn from the New Zealand sevens squad to focus on gaining international recognition with his native Samoa.

His ambitions were realized 2 years later when he was named in the Samoan squad for the 2014 end-of-year rugby union tests and made his international debut on 14 November 2014 in a 23-13 victory over Canada in Vannes, France.

Most recently Tuala was called up, alongside fellow Saint Ken Pisi, to the Samoan squad for the 2017 internationals.
