= Joel Everson =

New Zealand rugby union footballer (born 1990)

- Born: Joel Everson; 9 March 1990 (age 36) Christchurch, New Zealand
- Height: 2.04 m (6 ft 8 1/2 in)
- Weight: 118 kg (18 st 8 lb)
- School: Saint Kentigern College

Rugby union career
- Position: Lock
Amateur team(s)
Years	Team	Apps	(Points)
	Christchurch Football Club	20	
- Correct as of 1 January 2012
Senior career
Years	Team	Apps	(Points)
2016–19	Hino Red Dolphins	30	(5)
Provincial / State sides
Years	Team	Apps	(Points)
2011–14	Canterbury	34	(10)
2015−	Southland	10	(0)
- Correct as of 12 October 2015

Joel Everson (born 9 March 1990) is a New Zealand rugby union footballer who plays as a Lock for Southland in the ITM Cup. His domestic performances have seen him named in the Crusaders Wider Training Squad for the 2013 Super Rugby season.
