= Leroy Van Dam =

- Born: Leroy Van Dam; 7 November 1993 (age 33) Morrinsville, New Zealand
- Height: 1.91 m (6 ft 3 in)
- Weight: 94 kg (14 st 11 lb)
- School: Sacred Heart College, Auckland

Rugby union career
- Position(s): Fullback, Wing
- Current team: Aurillac
Youth career
- -: Auckland
- –: Blues (Super Rugby)
Amateur team(s)
Years	Team	Apps	(Points)
?	Marist (Ak)		
–	Greerton Marist		
–	Dunedin Sharks		
Senior career
Years	Team	Apps	(Points)
2013–2014	Manawatu Turbos	5	(5)
2014-2016	Bay of Plenty	10	(10)
2017-2018	Otago	5	(0)
2018	Valley RFC	5	(20)
2018-2020	Jersey Reds	22	(60)
2020–	Aurillac		
- Correct as of 27 October 2019
International career
Years	Team	Apps	(Points)
2013	New Zealand U20	2	(10)

Leroy Van Dam (born 7 November 1993) is a professional rugby union player. He can play at Wing and full-back and is currently playing for Aurillac in the Pro D2.

== Career ==
Van Dam first played rugby for an Under 6 team in New Zealand.

Van Dam has also played junior rugby for the following sides; Auckland U18s, Blues U18s and Auckland under 20's.

He has featured with the New Zealand U20s and appeared at three Mitre 10 Cup teams – Manawatu, Bay of Plenty and Otago making a handful of senior appearances for each.

He briefly played for Valley RFC in the Hong Kong Premiership, before being signed by Jersey Reds, ahead of the 2018-2019 RFU Championship Season.

Van Dam capped a successful debut year at Jersey Reds. Scoring 40 points, in 20 appearances for the RFU Championship side.

On 3 April 2020, Van Dam left Jersey to join Pro D2 outfit Aurillac in France from the 2020-21 season.
