= Pete Samu =

Australia international rugby union player

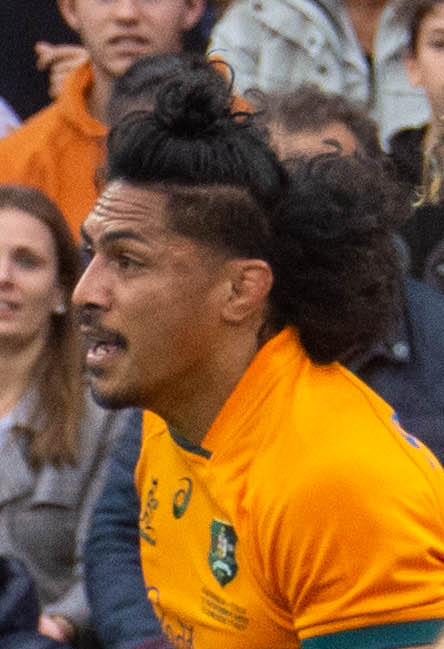
- Samu with Australia in 2022
- Full name: Peter Samu
- Born: 17 December 1991 (age 34) Melbourne, Victoria, Australia
- Height: 185 cm (6 ft 1 in)
- Weight: 102 kg (16 st 1 lb; 225 lb)
- School: Cranbourne Secondary College

Rugby union career
- Position(s): Flanker, Number 8
- Current team: Waratahs
Amateur team(s)
Years	Team	Apps	(Points)
2013	Randwick	13	(35)
Senior career
Years	Team	Apps	(Points)
2014–2017	Tasman	40	(65)
2016–2018	Crusaders	33	(40)
2018–2019	Canberra Vikings	10	(10)
2019–2023	Brumbies	69	(70)
2023–2026	Bordeaux Bègles	44	(60)
2026-	Waratahs	12	(5)
- Correct as of 30 May 2026
International career
Years	Team	Apps	(Points)
2018–	Australia	33	(15)
2025	ANZAC XV	1	(0)
- Correct as of 16 May 2026

Peter Samu (born 17 December 1991) is an Australian professional rugby union player who is currently a loose forward for the Waratahs in Super Rugby. He returned to Australia after playing for Bordeaux Begles in the French Top14 competition. He has represented Australia in international rugby. After several seasons playing in Australia and England, Samu gained his professional career breakthrough in New Zealand, firstly with Tasman in the Mitre 10 Cup and then the Crusaders in Super Rugby.

== Early life ==
Born in Melbourne, Victoria, Australia, Samu attended Cranbourne Secondary College. He first made his way in rugby playing for Moorabbin Rugby Club in his juniors before moving interstate to Brisbane and playing a handful of games in the first grade for Sunnybank Rugby. Samu played minimal first grade rugby in Brisbane, due to Wallabies (at the time) Jake Schatz and Liam Gill.

== Professional career ==
In 2012, Samu moved to Sydney to play for Randwick where he played majority of his rugby in premier division for the Shute Shield. He played a strong season in 2012 and won the most valuable player of the year award for the Shute Shield competition. Samu also had two-year stint in England playing local club rugby for St. Ives from 2010. He later moved to New Zealand in 2014 and began playing for Waimea Old Boys in the Tasman club rugby competition.

=== Tasman and Crusaders ===
Samu first made the Tasman squad for the 2014 ITM Cup and helped himself to 4 tries in 9 games as the Mako reached the competition's final before losing out to Taranaki. The following year, the men from Nelson reached the semi-finals of the 2015 ITM Cup with Samu once more playing 9 times while this time bagging 5 tries before scoring 3 times in 11 games in 2016 when the Makos were again defeated finalists, this time going down to Canterbury.

Samu played for the Crusaders Knights development team in 2015 and was named as their player of the year before being promoted to their senior squad ahead of the 2016 Super Rugby season. With competition for places tough among a star-studded Crusaders line-up which featured the likes of Kieran Read and Matt Todd, it was perhaps unsurprising that Samu only made 4 substitute appearances during his debut season. He was retained in the squad for 2017.

=== Wallabies and Brumbies ===
On 29 May 2018, Samu joined the Brumbies for the 2019 Super Rugby season with the possibility of a Wallabies call-up.

=== Union Bordeaux Begles ===
Samu signed for Union Bordeaux Begles ahead of the 2023 Top14 season. He scored 5 tries for UBB in his first season with the club.

In December 2024, he scored two tries during a 42–28 victory over Leicester Tigers in the opening round of the 2024-25 European Rugby Champions Cup. In April 2025, he scored a try in the Champions Cup quarter-finals during a 47–29 victory over Munster. In May 2025, he scored a try in the Champions Cup semi-finals during a 35–18 victory over reigning champions Toulouse to help his side reach their first ever European final.

== Statistics ==
As of 25 December 2016

Season	Team	Games	Starts	Sub	Mins	Tries	Cons	Pens	Drops	Points	Yel	Red
2016	Crusaders	4	0	4	93	1	0	0	0	5	0	0
2017	Crusaders	15	7	8	622	5	0	0	0	25	0	0
2018	Crusaders	14	5	9	547	2	0	0	0	10	0	0
Total		33	12	21	1262	8	0	0	0	40	0	0

=== List of international test tries ===
As of 3 July 2022

Try	Opposing team	Location	Venue	Competition	Date	Result	Score
1	England	Perth, Australia	Optus Stadium	2022 England rugby union tour of Australia	2 July 2022	Win	30 - 28

== Honours ==
Bordeaux Bègles

- 1× European Rugby Champions Cup: 2025
