= Gafatasi Su'a =

- Full name: Gafatasi William Su'a
- Born: 21 January 1992 (age 34) Auckland, New Zealand
- Height: 1.78 m (5 ft 10 in)
- Weight: 114 kg (17 st 13 lb; 251 lb)
- School: Mount Albert Grammar School

Rugby union career
- Position: Hooker
- Current team: Counties Manukau
Senior career
Years	Team	Apps	(Points)
2013−2014	Auckland	8	(10)
2015−	Counties Manukau	42	(10)
- Correct as of 23 October 2016
International career
Years	Team	Apps	(Points)
2010	New Zealand Schools		
- Correct as of 5 October 2015

Gafatasi Su'a (born 21 January 1992) is a New Zealand rugby union footballer who currently plays as a hooker for Counties Manukau in the ITM Cup. He previously turned out for Auckland from 2013 to 2014 and was briefly a member of the Blues squad during their tour of South Africa in 2013.

Su'a was a New Zealand Schools representative in 2010 and also played in both the Blues & Chiefs Development sides.
