= Adrian Smith (rugby union) =

NZ rugby union player (born 1987)

- Full name: Adrian Allan Vaughan Smith
- Born: 27 April 1987 (age 39)
- Height: 185 cm (6 ft 1 in)
- Weight: 116 kg (256 lb)

Rugby union career
- Position: Hooker
Senior career
Years	Team	Apps	(Points)
2018–23	Aurillac		
Provincial / State sides
Years	Team	Apps	(Points)
2009, 2013–17	North Harbour	27	(10)
Super Rugby
Years	Team	Apps	(Points)
2017	Highlanders	2	(0)

Adrian Allan Vaughan Smith (born 27 April 1987) is a New Zealand former professional rugby union player.

A hooker, Smith had several seasons with North Harbour and in 2017 was called up by the Highlanders as cover for their injured captain Ash Dixon, going on to make his Super Rugby debut off the bench against the Chiefs in Dunedin.

Smith joined French second-tier Pro D2 club Aurillac in 2018. He retired from professional rugby after Aurillac's 2022–23 campaign but made a return the following season to fill a gap caused by World Cup absences.
