= Maritino Nemani =

Fijian rugby union player (born 1991)

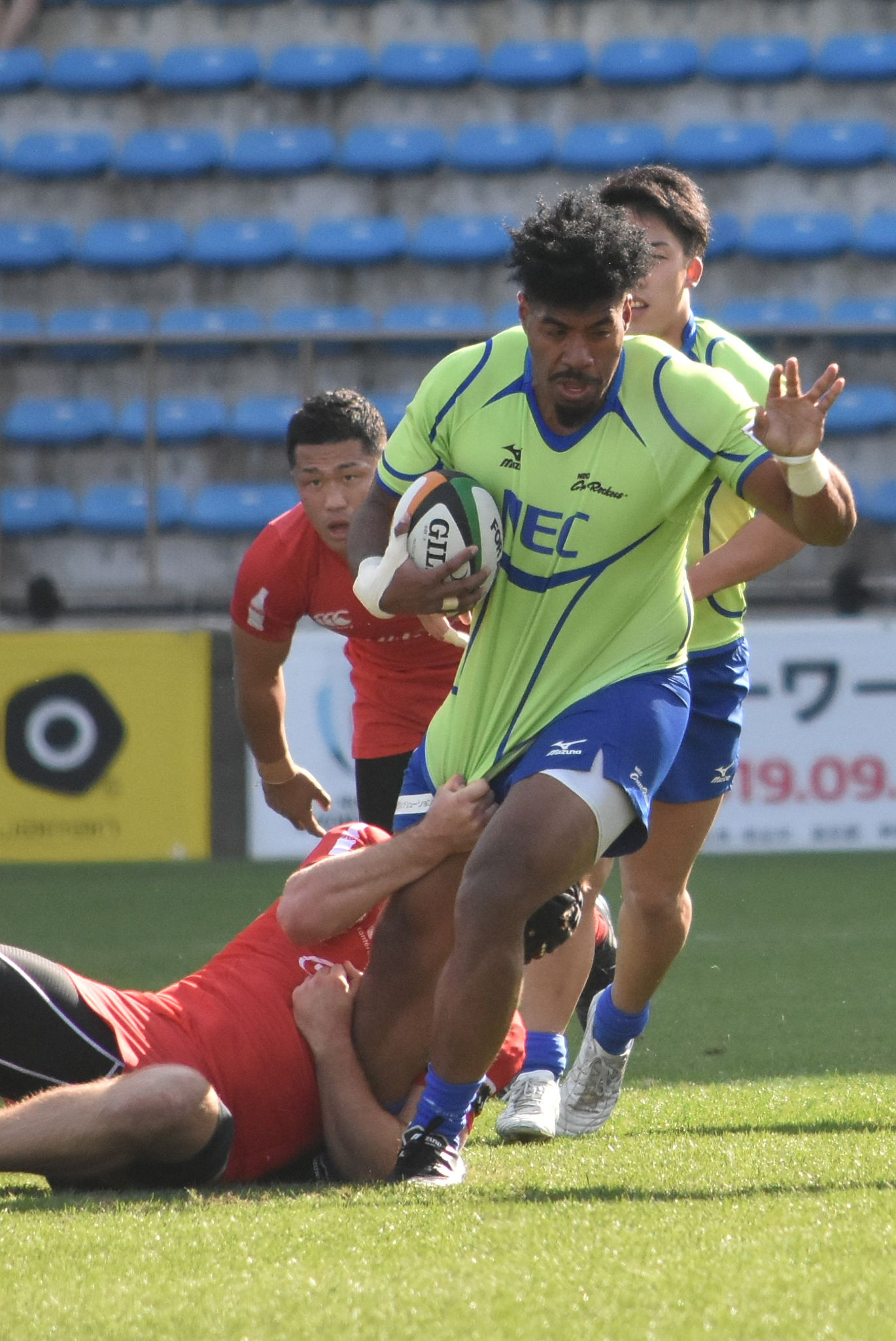
- Maritino Nemani playing a Rugby game in 2018
- Born: Maritino Nemani William Marcus; 25 May 1991 (age 35) Fiji
- Height: 1.82 m (5 ft 11 1/2 in)
- Weight: 105 kg (16 st 7 lb)

Rugby union career
- Position(s): Wing, Centre
- Current team: Shimizu Blue Sharks
Senior career
Years	Team	Apps	(Points)
2015–2017	Grenoble	9	(15)
2017–2025	NEC Green Rockets	68	(165)
2025–	Shimizu Blue Sharks	10	(5)
- Correct as of 21 February 2021
Provincial / State sides
Years	Team	Apps	(Points)
2011–2012	Hawke's Bay	13	(5)
2013–2014	Bay of Plenty	24	(20)
- Correct as of 21 February 2021
Super Rugby
Years	Team	Apps	(Points)
2012	Chiefs	4	(0)
2013	Highlanders	3	(0)
- Correct as of 1 June 2013
International career
Years	Team	Apps	(Points)
2010	Fiji U20	4	(5)
- Correct as of 7 December 2012

Maritino Nemani (born 25 May 1991) is a Fijian rugby union footballer. His regular playing position is as a winger. He plays for the Chiefs in Super Rugby and Bay of Plenty in the ITM Cup.

== Early years ==
Nemani is from Bua but moved to New Zealand as a child. He attended Sacred Heart College in Auckland, and represented New Zealand Secondary Schools. He represented Fiji under 20 in the 2010 IRB Junior World Championship. He joined French side FC Grenoble in 2015.

== Relatives ==
Nemani 'Junior' is the son of former Fiji and Suva soccer skipper Maritino Nemani.
