= Kayne Hammington =

New Zealand rugby union player (born 1990)

- Full name: Kayne William Hammington
- Born: 24 September 1990 (age 36) Upper Hutt, New Zealand
- Height: 1.70 m (5 ft 7 in)
- Weight: 74 kg (11 st 9 lb; 163 lb)
- School: St. Patrick's College

Rugby union career
- Position: Halfback
Senior career
Years	Team	Apps	(Points)
2012−2013	Wellington	9	(0)
2014−2018	Manawatu	40	(15)
2015−2016	Chiefs	6	(0)
2017−2022	Highlanders	53	(20)
2019−2021	Otago	27	(5)
2022–2025	Shimizu Blue Sharks	21	(5)
- Correct as of 10 June 2025
International career
Years	Team	Apps	(Points)
2010	New Zealand U20	5	(0)
- Correct as of 4 October 2015

Kayne Hammington (born 24 September 1990) is a New Zealand rugby union player who currently plays as a halfback for Otago in New Zealand's domestic Mitre 10 Cup and the Highlanders in the international Super Rugby competition.

== Early career ==
Hammington was born in the town of Upper Hutt, which lies to the north-east of Wellington, New Zealand's capital city. He was educated at St. Patrick's College, Silverstream in his hometown.

== Senior career ==
He started out in provincial rugby with his local side, the Wellington Lions and made 9 appearances across the 2012 and 2013 ITM Cup seasons. However, due to strong competition among the Lions halfbacks, he opted to head north for 2014 and join Manawatu. The move quickly paid off for both parties as Hammington played the season as the Turbos first choice half-back, featuring in 10 of their games in a season which saw them finish top of the ITM Cup Championship log with 8 wins in 10 games and earn promotion to the Premiership for 2015 with a 32-24 win over Hawke's Bay in the championship final.

Manawatu's stay in the Premiership would only last for 1 year, as a record of 3 wins from 10 games saw them relegated back down to the Championship for 2016. Hammington also found the going tougher in his second year in Palmerston North, starting just 3 times and generally playing back up to Jamie Booth throughout the year. 2016 didn't get much better, with the Turbos, now a championship side once more, finishing in 5th place on the log to miss out on the promotion playoffs altogether while Hammington had to make do with being part of a halfback rotation system along with Booth and the experienced Toby Morland, he played 6 times throughout the season, including 3 starts.

== Super Rugby ==
During the 2015 Super Rugby season, Hammington was called into the Chiefs squad as an injury replacement due to the absence of Tawera Kerr-Barlow, Augustine Pulu and Leon Fukofuka. He appeared on the bench once for the franchise's quarter final match away to the Highlanders, however he didn't get any game time. It was a case of déjà vu in 2016 as another halfback injury crisis at the Chiefs saw Hammington once more brought in as injury cover. This time, however, Hammington did manage to get on the field, debuting as a second-half replacement in the 53-10 demolition of the Force on 25 March and going on to make a total of 5 appearances throughout the year.

In October 2016, it was announced that Hammington had earned his first full-time Super Rugby contract with the 2015 champions, the Highlanders. He would join fellow Manawatu Turbo Aaron Smith and young Otago halfback Josh Renton in competition for the number 9 jersey in Tony Brown's side.

== International ==
Hammington was a member of the New Zealand Under-20 side which won the 2010 IRB Junior World Championship in Argentina, playing 5 times.

== Career Honours ==
New Zealand Under-20

- IRB Junior World Championship - 2010 IRB Junior World Championship

North Harbour

- ITM Cup Championship - 2014

== Super Rugby Statistics ==
As of 4 January 2017

Season	Team	Games	Starts	Sub	Mins	Tries	Cons	Pens	Drops	Points	Yel	Red
2015	Chiefs	0	0	0	0	0	0	0	0	0	0	0
2016	Chiefs	5	0	5	61	0	0	0	0	0	0	0
Total		5	0	5	61	0	0	0	0	0	0	0
