= Tim Boys =

- Born: 19 February 1984 (age 42) Oamaru, Otago, New Zealand
- Height: 1.89 m (6 ft 2 in)
- Weight: 98 kg (15 st 6 lb)

Rugby union career
- Position: Flanker
Senior career
Years	Team	Apps	(Points)
2005	Otago	10	(5)
2006–	Southland	128	(50)
- Correct as of 3 June 2018
Super Rugby
Years	Team	Apps	(Points)
2006–13	Highlanders	42	(5)
2016	Crusaders	10	(0)
- Correct as of 3 June 2018

Tim Boys (b. 19 February 1984 in Oamaru, New Zealand) is a New Zealand rugby union player who plays provincial rugby for Southland, and is in the Super Rugby team the Crusaders (rugby union).

== Career ==
Boys first played for Otago in 2005 then transferred to Southland after an injury break, where he has been a regular starter as openside flanker.
