= Leighton Price =

- Born: Leighton Tame Price; 24 March 1989 (age 37) Hamilton, New Zealand
- Height: 1.98 m (6 ft 6 in)
- Weight: 112 kg (247 lb)
- School: New Plymouth Boys' High School

Rugby union career
- Position: Lock
Provincial / State sides
Years	Team	Apps	(Points)
2010	Hawke's Bay	10	(0)
2011	Bay of Plenty	3	(0)
2012–	Taranaki	19	(5)
- Correct as of 11 December 2017
Super Rugby
Years	Team	Apps	(Points)
2017	Blues	2	(0)
- Correct as of 11 December 2017
International career
Years	Team	Apps	(Points)
2009	New Zealand U20	4	(0)
2016–	Māori All Blacks	4	(0)
- Correct as of 11 December 2017

Leighton Price (born 24 March 1989) is a New Zealand rugby union player. He plays for Taranaki in the ITM Cup. Previously he played for Hawke's Bay and Bay of Plenty. He plays Lock.

== Māori All Blacks ==
In October 2016 Price, who affiliates to the Ngāti Maniapoto iwi, was named in the Māori All Blacks team for their end-of-year tour to the Northern Hemisphere.
