= Rhys Marshall =

New Zealand rugby union player

- Born: Rhys Joseph Jennings Marshall; 12 October 1992 (age 34) New Plymouth, New Zealand
- Height: 1.82 m (5 ft 11 1/2 in)
- Weight: 111 kg (17.5 st; 245 lb)
- School: New Plymouth Boys' High School

Rugby union career
- Position: Hooker
Senior career
| Years | Team | Apps | (Points) |
| 2013–2016 | Taranaki | 40 | (40) |
| 2013–2016 | Chiefs | 31 | (5) |
| 2016–2021 | Munster | 80 | (75) |
| 2021– | North Harbour | 2 | (0) |
| 2021 | Waikato | 4 | (5) |
| 2022– | Highlanders | 9 | (20) |
- Correct as of 29 May 2022
International career
| Years | Team | Apps | (Points) |
| 2012 | New Zealand U20 | 4 | (5) |
- Correct as of 25 November 2012

Rhys Joseph Jennings Marshall (born 12 October 1992) is a New Zealand rugby union player. He plays as a hooker for Waikato in the National Provincial Championship and Highlanders in Super Rugby Pacific.

== Career in New Zealand ==
Marshall has international experience with the New Zealand under 20 side, having represented the Junior All Blacks at the 2012 IRB Junior World Championship in South Africa. Following on from the Junior World Cup, he played for Hawke's Bay's Colts team.

In October 2012, it was announced that Marshall was the surprise name in the Chiefs squad for the 2013 Super Rugby season as he was still awaiting his ITM Cup debut. He also went on to sign with Taranaki for 2013.

He started his first Super Rugby game for the Chiefs 41–27 win over the Highlanders. At 20 years of age, Marshall had yet to play ITM Cup rugby, got the callup to start after former All Black Hika Elliot failed a fitness test, and with Mahonri Schwalger also injured, Marshall got the job. In 2013, he signed a contract extension with the Chiefs until 2015.

Marshall returned to New Zealand after 5 years in Ireland, and joined North Harbour ahead of the 2021 National Provincial Championship. He was selected in the Highlanders squad for the 2022 Super Rugby Pacific season.

== Move to Ireland ==
On 4 October 2016, it was announced that Marshall would be joining Irish Pro14 side Munster on a three-year contract, which began following the completion of his Mitre 10 Cup commitments with Taranaki. On 4 November 2016, Marshall made his debut for Munster when he came on as a replacement during the 2016–17 Pro12 fixture against Ospreys. On 26 November 2016, Marshall made his first start for Munster during the 46–3 win against Benetton at Thomond Park. Marshall earned the Man-of-the-Match award in Munster's 36–10 win against Ospreys in a 2017–18 Pro14 fixture on 2 December 2017.

He won his 50th cap for Munster on 19 May 2018, doing so when he started against Leinster in the provinces 16–15 Pro14 semi-final defeat. Marshall scored two tries in Munster's 49–13 win against Ospreys on 14 September 2018 in round 3 of the 2018–19 Pro14. He signed a two-year contract extension with Munster in December 2018. Marshall was released by Munster at the end of the 2020–21 season and returned to New Zealand.
