= Vernon Fredericks =

- Born: Vernon John Fredericks; 7 July 1990 (age 36) New Zealand
- Height: 183 cm (6 ft 0 in)
- Weight: 106 kg (16 st 10 lb; 234 lb)

Rugby union career
- Position(s): Flanker, Number 8
Senior career
Years	Team	Apps	(Points)
2010–2018	Tasman	56	(20)
- Correct as of 18 July 2021
Super Rugby
Years	Team	Apps	(Points)
2017	Crusaders	1	(0)
- Correct as of 18 July 2021

Vernon John Fredericks (born 7 July 1990) is a former New Zealand rugby union player who played for Tasman in the Bunnings NPC competition. His position was flanker.

== Tasman ==
Fredericks made his debut for Tasman in 2010, playing at hooker, but then converted to flanker. Throughout his years at the Mako, Fredericks made many appearances for the franchise and in 2017 he played in his 50th game for the side against Otago in a 27–29 win for Tasman. Fredericks made a further 6 appearances for the Mako before in Round 1 of the 2018 Mitre 10 Cup when the Mako played Canterbury, Fredericks suffered a season ending injury after just eight minutes on the field.

== Super Rugby ==
Fredericks made his debut for the Crusaders in 2017 when they played the Chiefs in Suva, Fiji. He came into the squad as a replacement for the injured Matt Todd and became Crusader number 213 with just seven minutes remaining in the match with the Chiefs having just scored a try. The Crusaders however did win the match 24–31.
