= Marty Banks =

- Full name: Martin Banks
- Born: 19 September 1989 (age 37) Reefton, New Zealand
- Height: 188 cm (6 ft 2 in)
- Weight: 91 kg (201 lb; 14 st 5 lb)
- School: Christchurch Boys' High School

Rugby union career
- Position(s): First five-eighth, Fullback
Senior career
Years	Team	Apps	(Points)
2011	Krasny Yar Krasnoyarsk		
2012	Buller	10	(131)
2013–2016	Tasman	40	(628)
2014	Hurricanes	5	(5)
2015–2017, 2019, 2022	Highlanders	51	(243)
2017–2018	Benetton	16	(83)
2018–2021	Red Hurricanes Osaka	16	(106)
2021–2023	Southland	21	(148)
- Correct as of 27 May 2025

Martin Banks (born 19 September 1989) is a former New Zealand rugby union player. His position was First five-eighth and occasionally Fullback.

== Career ==
Banks was playing for the Takapuna Rugby Club in Auckland when the opportunity came from the Canterbury Rugby Union to head to Russia to play for Krasny Yar Krasnoyarsk. After a season with the side, he was offered a two-year contract with Krasny Yar but Banks chose to leave the country and come back to New Zealand, where he began his career with Buller. He made his provincial debut with the side in the 2012 Heartland Championship, Banks scored a record 131 points for the province, including 16 in Buller's 31–28 win over South Canterbury in the Lochore Cup final.

In 2013, Banks featured in the Crusaders development team as well as being included in the extended training squad for Tasman. Banks was later called into the squad and made his debut against Counties Manukau. He set records with the side scoring all 28 points in Tasman's 28–13 win over Northland, while he scored another 24 points in the 64–28 win over Waikato. In October Banks landed a Super Rugby deal with the Hurricanes. Banks had been prominent at first five-eighth, and Hurricanes coach Mark Hammett said his incredible kicking game had been hard to ignore. But at the end of 2014, he signed a deal with the Highlanders for the 2015 and 2016 seasons. In May 2016, Banks signed a 1-year deal with Italian rugby union team Benetton.

He returned to the Highlanders for the 2019 Super Rugby season. After playing in Japan Banks returned to New Zealand again in 2021 and signed with Southland for the 2021 Bunnings NPC. Not long after he was again signed by the Highlanders for the 2022 Super Rugby Pacific season.
