= Marty McKenzie (rugby union) =

New Zealand rugby union player

- Full name: Martin Ramsay McKenzie
- Born: 14 August 1992 (age 34) Invercargill, New Zealand
- Height: 183 cm (6 ft 0 in)
- Weight: 85 kg (187 lb; 13 st 5 lb)
- School: Christ's College, Christchurch
- Notable relative(s): Damian McKenzie (brother); Robbie Robinson (cousin)
- Occupation: Rugby player

Rugby union career
- Position(s): First five-eighth, Fullback
- Current team: Southland, Chiefs
Senior career
Years	Team	Apps	(Points)
2011–2013, 2019–	Southland	34	(119)
2013	Blues	2	(0)
2014–2017	Taranaki	36	(392)
2015, 2018–2019	Chiefs	31	(86)
2016–2017	Crusaders	9	(19)
- Correct as of 22 June 2019
International career
Years	Team	Apps	(Points)
2012	New Zealand U20	4	(10)
2014–2016	Māori All Blacks	6	(17)
- Correct as of 22 June 2019
National sevens team
Years	Team		Comps
2014	New Zealand		2
- Correct as of 22 June 2019

Martin Ramsay McKenzie (born 14 August 1992) is a rugby union footballer who plays as either a first five-eighth or fullback. He represents the Southland Stags in the Mitre 10 Cup. He currently plays for the Chiefs in Super Rugby.

McKenzie was a member of the New Zealand under 20 side that competed in the 2012 IRB Junior World Championship in South Africa.

McKenzie is the cousin of former Stags teammate Robbie Robinson and also brother of Chiefs player Damian McKenzie

In March 2014, Mckenzie was called up to play for the New Zealand Sevens team.

== Personal life ==
McKenzie is a New Zealander of Māori descent (Ngāti Tūwharetoa descent).
