= Matt McGahan =

Australian rugby union & league player

Matthew McGahan
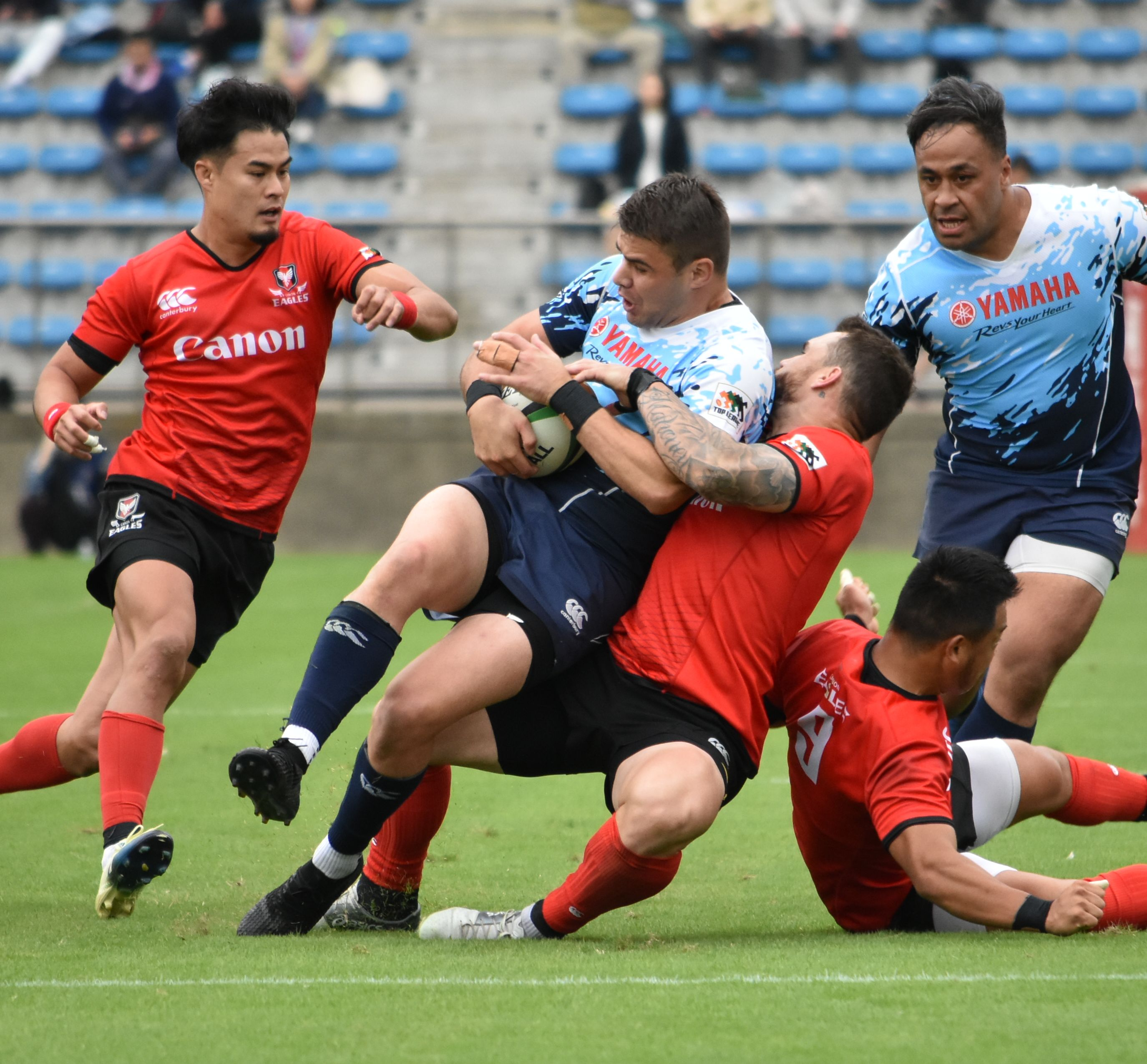

Personal information
- Born: Matthew Thomas McGahan; 21 April 1993 (age 33) Sydney, New South Wales, Australia
- Height: 1.85 m (6 ft 1 in)
- Weight: 91 kg (201 lb)

Playing information
- Position: Five-eighth
Club
Years	Team	Pld	T	G	FG	P
2013	Melbourne Storm	0				0

Rugby union career
- Position(s): Fly-half, Inside Centre, Fullback
Senior career
Years	Team	Apps	(Points)
2014–2016 2019	North Harbour	40	(164)
2015–2016	Blues	12	(5)
2017–2018	Yamaha Júbilo	19	(64)
2019	Reds	5	(3)
2020–2024	Ricoh Black Rams	47	(290)
2024–	Toyota Verblitz	18	(38)
- Correct as of 21 February 2021
- Education: Mount Albert Grammar School
- Father: Hugh McGahan

Matthew McGahan (born 21 April 1993) is an Australian born rugby union player of Irish descent. His father played professional rugby league in New Zealand. Matt plays in the fly-half (and occasionally inside centre) position for The Ricoh Black Rams. and formerly in the Mitre 10 Cup for North Harbour and Australia's National Rugby League (NRL) rugby league club the Melbourne Storm. He formerly played for Yamaha Jubilo in the Japanese top League.

McGahan is eligible to represents Japan at international level after qualifying on residency grounds.

He is the son of rugby league legend, Hugh McGahan.

== Early life ==
McGahan came to the attention of national selectors at the age of 17, after he was selected in the New Zealand secondary schools team against Australia in 2010. He attended Mount Albert Grammar School in Auckland, where he excelled in its first XV. Despite numerous approaches from rugby union while still at school, McGahan decided to take up a rugby league contract with the Melbourne Storm in the NRL's under-20s competition.

After three seasons with the Storm, McGahan had made 54 appearances in the NRL Under-20s competition scoring 421 points. He left Melbourne following the 2013 season, returning to New Zealand and the sport of rugby union.
