= Iopu Iopu-Aso =

NZ rugby union player

- Born: 1 April 1991 (age 35) Auckland, New Zealand
- Height: 1.89 m (6 ft 2 in)
- Weight: 105 kg (16 st 7 lb)
- School: Mount Albert Grammar School

Rugby union career
Provincial / State sides
Years	Team	Apps	(Points)
2014–	Taranaki	23	(25)
- Correct as of 23 October 2016
Super Rugby
Years	Team	Apps	(Points)
2015–16	Hurricanes	0	(0)
- Correct as of 6 August 2016
International career
Years	Team	Apps	(Points)
2010	Samoa under-20	4	(5)
- Correct as of 21 June 2010
National sevens team
Years	Team		Comps
2012	New Zealand		1
- Correct as of 13 April 2015

Iopu Iopu-Aso (born 1 April 1991) is a New Zealand rugby union player who currently plays as a loose forward for Taranaki in the ITM Cup and the Hurricanes in Super Rugby.

== Career ==
Born in Auckland to Samoan parents, Iopu-Aso had to leave his home province due to a lack of opportunities and decided to set up home in New Plymouth. He worked part-time putting up marquees and also as a truck driver while he played locally for Spotswood United. He made the Taranaki Development squad in 2013 and was subsequently promoted to the ITM Cup side for 2014. He made an instant impact during a highly impressive campaign for Taranaki and as a reward he was named in the Hurricanes squad for the 2015 Super Rugby season.

== International career ==
Iopu-Aso was a New Zealand sevens representative in 2012
