= Te Aihe Toma =

New Zealand rugby player

- Born: 15 March 1993 (age 33)
- Height: 1.73 m (5 ft 8 in)
- Weight: 88 kg (13 st 12 lb; 194 lb)

Rugby union career
- Position: Halfback
- Current team: Bay of Plenty
Senior career
Years	Team	Apps	(Points)
2013−	Bay of Plenty	34	(30)
2016	Highlanders	3	(0)
2016–2017	→ Munster	1	(0)
- Correct as of 3 December 2016

Te Aihe Taonga Miharo Lawrence Anderson Toma (Te Aihe Toma) (born 15 March 1993) is a New Zealand rugby union footballer who currently plays as a Halfback for the Bay of Plenty Steamers in the Mitre 10 Cup. He also featured for Dunedin-based Super Rugby franchise, the Highlanders, during the 2016 season.

== Provincial career ==
Toma debuted for Bay of Plenty during the 2013 season and went on to become more of a regular through to 2015 where he featured in a career high 11 matches and scored one try in the process. In 2018 he featured 10 matches and scored one try in the process.

== Munster ==
On 7 November 2016, it was announced that Toma had joined Irish Pro12 side Munster on a short-term loan. On 2 December 2016, Toma made his competitive debut for Munster when he came on as a replacement for Duncan Williams in a 2016–17 Pro12 fixture against Scottish side Glasgow Warriors.

== Super Rugby ==
Toma spent the early part of the 2016 Super Rugby season with the Chiefs Development Squad, however a halfback crisis which saw Aaron Smith, Fumiaki Tanaka and Josh Renton all ruled out after the 2016 mid-year rugby union internationals break led to Toma receiving a call up to the Highlanders squad for their tours of South Africa and Argentina. In all, Toma made 3 appearances for the Highlanders, starting one game as they reached the semi-finals of the competition.

== Super Rugby statistics ==
As of 16 August 2016

Season	Team	Games	Starts	Sub	Mins	Tries	Cons	Pens	Drops	Points	Yel	Red
2016	Highlanders	3	1	2	79	0	0	0	0	0	0	0
Total		3	1	2	79	0	0	0	0	0	0	0
