= Jamie Booth =

New Zealand rugby union player

- Full name: Jamie Patrick Booth
- Born: 14 September 1994 (age 32) Palmerston North, New Zealand
- Height: 171 cm (5 ft 7 in)
- Weight: 92 kg (203 lb; 14 st 7 lb)
- School: Palmerston North Boys' High School

Rugby union career
- Position(s): Half-back, Wing
- Current team: Manawatu, Hurricanes
Senior career
Years	Team	Apps	(Points)
2014–2021	Manawatu	60	(65)
2016	Newcastle Falcons	1	(0)
2016	Highlanders	1	(0)
2018–	Hurricanes	34	(15)
2019	Sunwolves	12	(10)
2022-2023	North Harbour	21	(30)
- Correct as of 5 June 2022
National sevens team
Years	Team		Comps
2017	New Zealand		2
- Correct as of 5 June 2022

Jamie Patrick Booth (born 14 September 1994) is a New Zealand retired rugby union player who played as a halfback, Wing for the Hurricanes in Super Rugby and Manawatu in the Mitre 10 Cup.

He has also played for the Highlanders. Booth made his debut on 2 July 2016 against the Southern Kings coming on as a substitute.

Booth had a stint in England playing for Newcastle Falcons.

During the 2015 Super Rugby season he was called into the Blues squad as an injury replacement for Bryn Hall, however he didn't make any appearances.

Jamie sustained a bad knee injury playing for Manawatū at the end the 2020 ITM Cup, resulting in him missing the 2021 Super Rugby season, and later retiring from Rugby as a result.
