= Mike Kainga =

NZ rugby union player

- Born: Michael Zavala Harley Kainga; 28 January 1991 (age 35) Hawke's Bay, New Zealand
- Height: 187 cm (6 ft 2 in)
- Weight: 116 kg (18 st 4 lb)
- School: Taita College

Rugby union career
- Position: Prop
- Current team: Taranaki
Senior career
Years	Team	Apps	(Points)
2012–2015	Bay of Plenty	24	(15)
2013	Chiefs	2	(0)
2016–2017	Hurricanes	12	(0)
2016–	Taranaki	9	(0)
- Correct as of 30 December 2017
International career
Years	Team	Apps	(Points)
2011	New Zealand U20	4	(0)
2014	Māori All Blacks	2	(0)
- Correct as of 11 November 2014

Michael "Mike" Zavala Harley Kainga (born 28 January 1991) is a New Zealand rugby union player who last played for the Bay of Plenty Steamers in the ITM Cup. He signed for Taranaki to play in the 2016 Mitre 10 Cup. His position of choice is prop.

His impressive domestic performances for Bay of Plenty saw him named in the Chiefs Wider Training Squad for the 2013 Super Rugby season. He made three appearances for the franchise.

He was called into the Hurricanes Wider Training Squad in 2016, he then gained 4 caps including playing in the 2016 Super Rugby season final.

Kainga was a member of the New Zealand Under 20 side which won the 2011 IRB Junior World Championship. He played in 4 games during the tournament, 1 start and 3 substitute appearances.

== Personal life ==
Kainga is a New Zealander of Māori descent (Ngāti Kahungunu descent).
