= 2016 Mitre 10 Cup =

2016 rugby union competition in New Zealand

2016 Mitre 10 Cup season
- Countries: New Zealand
- Date: 18 August – 29 October
- Champions: Canterbury
- Runners-up: Tasman
- Promoted: North Harbour
- Relegated: Hawke's Bay
- Matches played: 76
- Tries scored: 497 (average 6.5 per match)
- Top point scorer: Marty Banks (Tasman); 161 points
- Top try scorer: Rieko Ioane (Auckland); 10 tries

Official website
- www.provincial.rugby

The 2016 Mitre 10 Cup season was the eleventh season of New Zealand's provincial rugby union competition since it turned professional in 2006. The regular season began on August 18, when North Harbour hosted Counties Manukau. It involved the top fourteen rugby unions of New Zealand. For sponsorship reasons, the competition was known as the Mitre 10 Cup and it was the first season under the lead sponsor. The winner of the Championship, North Harbour was promoted to the Premiership, the seventh placed Premiership team, Hawke's Bay was relegated to the Championship.

== Format ==
The Mitre 10 Cup standings were sorted by a competition points system. Four points were awarded to the winning team, a draw equaled two points, whilst a loss amounted to zero points. Unions could also win their side a respectable bonus point. To receive a bonus point, they must have scored four tries or more or lose by seven or fewer points or less. Each team was placed on their total points received. If necessary of a tiebreaker, when two or more teams finish on equal points, the union who defeated the other in a head-to-head got placed higher. In case of a draw between them, the side with the biggest points differential margin got rights to be ranked above. If they were tied on points difference, it was then decided by a highest scored try count or a coin toss. This seeding format was implemented since the beginning of the 2006 competition.

The competition included a promotion-relegation process with the winner of the Championship receiving automatic promotion to the Premiership, replacing the seventh-placed team in the Premiership which was relegated to the Championship for the following year. The regular season consisted of two types of matches. The internal division matches were when each team played the other six unions in their division once, home or away. The cross-division matches were when each team played four teams from the other division, thus missing out on three teams, each from the opposite division. Each union played home or away games against teams from the other division, making a total of ten competition games for each union. The finals format allowed the top four teams from each division move on to the semi-finals. The top two division winners, based on table points, received a home semi-final. In the first round of the finals, the semi-finals, the second division winner hosted the third division winner, and the first division winner hosted the fourth division winner. The final was hosted by the top remaining seed.

== Standings ==
Source: Mitre 10 Cup standings 2016

Premiership Division
#	Team	GP	W	D	L	PF	PA	PD	TB	LB	PTS
1	RS – Canterbury	10	8	0	2	397	219	+178	7	1	40
2	Taranaki	10	7	1	2	338	259	+79	5	2	37
3	Tasman	10	7	1	2	306	234	+72	3	1	34
4	Counties Manukau	10	6	0	4	284	234	+50	6	4	34
5	Waikato	10	5	1	4	269	259	+10	6	2	30
6	Auckland	10	5	0	5	335	302	+33	7	3	30
7	Hawke's Bay	10	2	0	8	253	385	–132	4	3	15

Championship Division
#	Team	GP	W	D	L	PF	PA	PD	TB	LB	PTS
1	Otago	10	7	0	3	290	267	+23	5	1	34
2	Wellington	10	6	0	4	302	298	+4	6	2	32
3	North Harbour	10	5	1	4	262	263	–1	3	1	26
4	Bay of Plenty	10	3	0	7	302	316	–14	7	4	23
5	Manawatu	10	4	0	6	259	266	–7	4	3	23
6	Northland	10	1	0	9	280	380	–100	5	2	11
7	Southland	10	2	0	8	201	396	–195	2	1	11

=== Standings progression ===
Premiership
Team	W1	W2	W3	W4	W5	W6	W7	W8	W9
Auckland	0 (7th)	5 (5th)	10 (4th)	16 (2nd)	17 (5th)	22 (4th)	27 (3rd)	28 (4th)	30 (6th)
Canterbury	5 (1st)	10 (1st)	15 (1st)	20 (1st)	21 (1st)	26 (1st)	35 (1st)	40 (1st)	40 (1st)
Counties Manukau	1 (4th)	6 (4th)	11 (2nd)	12 (5th)	19 (3rd)	24 (3rd)	25 (4th)	29 (3rd)	34 (4th)
Hawke's Bay	1 (6th)	2 (7th)	2 (7th)	3 (7th)	8 (7th)	10 (7th)	14 (7th)	14 (7th)	15 (7th)
Taranaki	4 (2nd)	9 (2nd)	10 (3rd)	14 (4th)	20 (2nd)	25 (2nd)	27 (2nd)	32 (2nd)	37 (2nd)
Tasman	4 (3rd)	4 (6th)	8 (6th)	9 (6th)	13 (6th)	18 (6th)	22 (5th)	27 (5th)	34 (3rd)
Waikato	1 (5th)	6 (3rd)	10 (5th)	15 (3rd)	17 (4th)	18 (5th)	20 (6th)	25 (6th)	30 (5th)
Championship
Team	W1	W2	W3	W4	W5	W6	W7	W8	W9
Bay of Plenty	0 (6th)	2 (5th)	4 (5th)	9 (4th)	9 (4th)	12 (5th)	13 (5th)	18 (5th)	23 (4th)
Manawatu	5 (3rd)	10 (2nd)	10 (2nd)	11 (3rd)	15 (3rd)	15 (3rd)	15 (4th)	22 (3rd)	23 (5th)
North Harbour	4 (4th)	4 (4th)	5 (4th)	9 (5th)	9 (5th)	14 (4th)	19 (3rd)	19 (4th)	26 (3rd)
Northland	2 (5th)	2 (7th)	4 (6th)	4 (6th)	4 (6th)	4 (7th)	9 (6th)	10 (7th)	11 (6th)
Otago	5 (1st)	10 (1st)	20 (1st)	24 (1st)	28 (1st)	29 (1st)	29 (1st)	30 (1st)	34 (1st)
Southland	0 (7th)	2 (6th)	2 (7th)	2 (7th)	2 (7th)	6 (6th)	6 (7th)	11 (6th)	11 (7th)
Wellington	5 (2nd)	5 (3rd)	9 (3rd)	13 (2nd)	18 (2nd)	23 (2nd)	28 (2nd)	30 (2nd)	32 (2nd)
The table above shows a team's progression throughout the season. For each week, their cumulative points total is shown with the overall division log position in brackets.
Key:	Win	Draw	Loss	Bye					

== Regular season ==
The 2016 Mitre 10 Cup played across nine weeks with every team playing one Wednesday night fixture in a double-up round where they played twice that week. The competition started on Thursday, August 18, with North Harbour taking on Counties Manukau at QBE Stadium. Hawke's Bay hosted Wellington and Auckland versus Canterbury, in two repeat matchups of last year's finalists.

=== Week 1 ===
18 August 2016
19:35 NZST

North Harbour	20–17	Counties Manukau
Try: Afa Fa'atau 3'; Michael Little 56'; Con: Matt Vaega (1/1) 4'; Bryn Gatland (1/1) 57'; Pen: Matt Vaega (1/1) 38'; Bryn Gatland (1/1) 54'	Report	Try: Jordan Taufua 26'; Sione Faletau 73'; Con: Piers Francis (2/2) 26', 74'; Pen: Joe Reynolds (1/2) 12'; Piers Francis (0/1); Cards: Sam Vaka (yellow card) 33'

North Harbour Stadium, Albany
Referee: Shane McDermott

19 August 2016
19:35 NZST

Northland	27–34	Manawatu
Try: Michael Faleafa (2) 27', 35'; Warren Dunn 32'; Jack Ram 59'; Con: Peter Breen (2/4) 28', 36'; Pen: Peter Breen (1/1) 66'	Report	Try: Ngani Laumape 10'; Heiden Bedwell-Curtis 21'; Ambrose Curtis 70'; Jason Emery 76'; Con: Sam Malcolm (2/2) 11', 22'; Otere Black (2/2) 71', 77'; Pen: Sam Malcolm (2/3) 17', 41'; Cards: Hamish Northcott (yellow card) 27'

Okara Park, Whangārei
Referee: Angus Mabey

20 August 2016
14:35 NZST

Bay of Plenty	22–30	Taranaki
Try: Lalakai Foketi 56'; Te Rangi Fraser 61'; Joe Tupe 70'; Con: Kelly Haimona (2/3) 62', 71'; Pen: Luke Campbell (1/1) 73'; Kelly Haimona (0/1)	Report	Try: Johnny Fa'auli 11'; Bernie Hall 32'; Te Toiroa Tahuriorangi 52'; Con: Marty McKenzie (3/3) 12', 33', 53'; Pen: Marty McKenzie (3/3) 59', 65', 75'

Tauranga Domain, Tauranga
Referee: Michael Lash

20 August 2016
17:35 NZST

Hawke's Bay	26–36	Wellington
Try: Billy Ropiha 19'; Fa'alemiga Selesele 37'; Geoffrey Cridge 71'; Ryan Tongia 75'; Con: Ihaia West (3/4) 38', 72', 76'; Pen: Ihaia West (0/1)	Report	Try: Alex Fidow 33'; Jackson Garden-Bachop 46'; Galu Taufale 62'; Joe Hill 66'; Greg Foe 73'; Con: Jason Woodward (1/1) 34'; Jackson Garden-Bachop (3/4) 63', 67', 74'; Pen: Jackson Garden-Bachop (1/2) 41'; Jason Woodward (0/1)

McLean Park, Napier
Referee: Brett Johnson

20 August 2016
19:35 NZST

Canterbury	43–3	Auckland
Try: Richie Mo'unga 8'; Ben Funnell 28'; Johnny McNicholl (2) 32', 42'; Reed Prinsep 38'; Nathan Vella 57'; Con: Richie Mo'unga (4/5) 9', 29', 33', 43'; Ben Volavola (1/1) 58'; Pen: Richie Mo'unga (1/2) 21'	Report	Pen: Simon Hickey (1/1) 35'; Cards: Melani Nanai (yellow card) 32'

Rugby League Park, Christchurch
Referee: Mike Fraser

21 August 2016
14:35 NZST

Southland	17–40	Otago
Try: Jaye Thompson-Te Muunu 50'; Con: Wharenui Hawera (0/1); Pen: Wharenui Hawera (4/4) 12', 22', 28', 31'	Report	Try: Dillon Hunt 38'; Teihorangi Walden (2) 45', 61'; Michael Collins 53'; Josh Walden 77'; Con: Fletcher Smith (3/4) 54', 62', 78'; Scott Eade (0/1); Pen: Fletcher Smith (3/3) 67', 69', 71'

Rugby Park Stadium, Invercargill
Referee: Jamie Nutbrown

21 August 2016
16:35 NZST

Tasman	24–19	Waikato
Try: Finlay Christie 47'; Alex Ainley 75'; Con: Mitchell Hunt (1/2) 48'; Pen: Mitchell Hunt (4/5) 7', 35', 40', 80'	Report	Try: Jordan Trainor 32'; Con: Damian McKenzie (1/1) 33'; Pen: Damian McKenzie (4/4) 28', 51', 62', 71'

Lansdowne Park, Blenheim
Referee: Kane McBride

=== Week 2 ===
25 August 2016
19:35 NZST

Otago	44–21	Wellington
Try: Matt Faddes 9'; Tom Franklin 18'; Sam Anderson-Heather 23'; Jack Wilson 32'; Michael Collins 48'; Con: Fletcher Smith (5/5) 10', 19', 24', 33', 49'; Pen: Fletcher Smith (2/4) 71', 76'; Scott Eade (1/1) 78'	Report	Try: Wes Goosen 43'; Shaun Treeby 59'; Matt Proctor 65'; Con: Jackson Garden-Bachop (3/3) 44', 60', 66'

Forsyth Barr Stadium, Dunedin
Referee: Nick Briant

26 August 2016
17:45 NZST

Manawatu	34–31	Southland
Try: Callum Gibbins 5'; Ngani Laumape (3) 19', 28', 48'; Con: Otere Black (4/4) 6', 20', 29', 49'; Pen: Otere Black (2/2) 13', 81'	Report	Try: Mikaele Mafi 43'; Junior Ngaluafe 45'; Wharenui Hawera 55'; Bill Fukofuka 77'; Con: Wharenui Hawera (4/4) 44', 46', 56', 78'; Pen: Wharenui Hawera (1/1) 62'

Arena Manawatu, Palmerston North
Referee: Cameron Stone

26 August 2016
19:45 NZST

Auckland	37–15	Northland
Try: Pryor Collier 13'; Kurt Eklund 26'; Steven Luatua (2) 58', 62'; Vince Aso 74'; Con: Simon Hickey (3/5) 14', 63', 75'; Pen: Simon Hickey (2/3) 5', 46'	Report	Try: Josh Larsen 37'; Jone Macilai-Tori 69'; Con: Peter Breen (1/2) 70'; Pen: Peter Breen (1/1) 3'

Eden Park, Auckland
Attendance: 2,400
Referee: Jamie Nutbrown

27 August 2016
14:35 NZST

RS – Waikato	26–15	North Harbour
Try: Isaac Boss 1'; Loni Uhila 4'; Nathaniel Apa 18'; Epalahame Faiva 66'; Con: Jordan Trainor (3/4) 2', 19', 67'	Report	Try: Michael Little 29'; Bryn Hall 45'; Con: Bryn Gatland (1/2) 30'; Pen: Bryn Gatland (1/3) 33'

Waikato Stadium, Hamilton
Referee: Mike Fraser

27 August 2016
16:35 NZST

Taranaki	55–28	Hawke's Bay
Try: Mitchell Crosswell 39'; Iopu Iopu-Aso 47'; Rhys Marshall 51'; Manasa Mataele 56'; Marty McKenzie 64'; Declan O'Donnell 75'; Trinity Spooner-Neera 80'; Con: Marty McKenzie (7/7) 40', 48', 52', 57', 65', 76', 80'; Pen: Marty McKenzie (2/3) 32', 69'	Report	Try: Jonah Lowe 6'; Ash Dixon 18'; Ihaia West 61'; Geoffrey Cridge 71'; Con: Ihaia West (4/4) 7', 19', 62', 72'

Yarrow Stadium, New Plymouth
Referee: Brendon Pickerill

28 August 2016
14:35 NZST

Canterbury	45–14	Tasman
Try: Jordie Barrett 17'; Dominic Bird 60'; Nathan Vella 67'; Jack Goodhue 70'; Inga Finau 80'; Con: Jordie Barrett (4/5) 18', 68', 71', 80'; Pen: Jordie Barrett (4/4) 8', 23', 34', 50'	Report	Try: Tima Fainga'anuku 52'; Con: Marty Banks (0/1); Pen: Marty Banks (3/3) 11', 13', 29'

Rugby League Park, Christchurch
Referee: Shane McDermott

28 August 2016
16:35 NZST

Counties Manukau	39–34	Bay of Plenty
Try: Jordan Taufua 32'; Viliame Rarasea 45'; Penalty try 51'; Sione Molia 55'; Sherwin Stowers 58'; Con: Piers Francis (4/5) 46', 52', 56', 59'; Pen: Piers Francis (2/2) 10', 16'	Report	Try: Monty Ioane (2) 6', 78'; Hugh Blake 19'; James O'Reilly 67'; Regan Ware 74'; Con: Kelly Haimona (1/2) 20'; Te Aihe Toma (2/3) 68', 75'; Pen: Kelly Haimona (1/1) 2'; Cards: Monty Ioane (yellow card) 51'

ECOLight Stadium, Pukekohe
Referee: Paul Williams

=== Week 3 ===
31 August 2016
19:35 NZST

Otago	33–28	Northland
Try: Naulia Dawai 6'; Jack Wilson (2) 39', 46'; Matt Faddes 72'; Con: Fletcher Smith (1/3) 47'; Scott Eade (1/1) 73'; Pen: Fletcher Smith (3/3) 15', 26', 34'	Report	Try: Matthew Matich 27'; Shane Neville 43'; Jone Macilai-Tori 78'; Con: Peter Breen (2/3) 44', 79'; Pen: Peter Breen (3/4) 12', 19', 65'

Forsyth Barr Stadium, Dunedin
Referee: Richard Kelly

1 September 2016
19:35 NZST

Hawke's Bay	20–48	Counties Manukau
Try: Robbie Fruean 19'; Ryan Tongia 66'; Con: Ihaia West (2/2) 20', 67'; Pen: Ihaia West (2/3) 15', 37'	Report	Try: Luteru Laulala 7'; Sam Vaka 23'; Jordan Taufua (2) 28', 70'; Sione Fifita 75'; Con: Piers Francis (4/5) 8', 29', 71', 76'; Pen: Piers Francis (4/4) 42', 48', 51', 63'; Drop: Piers Francis (1/1) 3'

McLean Park, Napier
Referee: Nick Briant

2 September 2016
19:35 NZST

Southland	16–51	Auckland
Try: Jimmy Cowan 64'; Con: Jaye Thompson-Te Muunu (1/1) 65'; Pen: Lima Sopoaga (3/3) 7', 36', 47'; Cards: Kieran Moffat (yellow card) 55'; Lima Sopoaga (yellow card) 59'	Report	Try: Rieko Ioane (2) 41', 75'; Joe Ravouvou 60'; Patrick Tuipulotu 70'; Pryor Collier 72'; Kurt Eklund 79'; Con: Simon Hickey (5/5) 42', 61', 71', 73', 76'; Jono Hickey (1/1) 80'; Pen: Simon Hickey (3/4) 17', 24', 30'

Rugby Park Stadium, Invercargill
Referee: Kane McBride

3 September 2016
14:35 NZST

Tasman	25–20	Taranaki
Try: Kieron Fonotia 57'; Con: Marty Banks (1/1) 58'; Pen: Marty Banks (6/6) 9', 26', 44', 52', 67', 74'	Report	Try: Seta Tamanivalu 34'; Beaudein Waaka 49'; Con: Marty McKenzie (2/2) 35', 50'; Pen: Marty McKenzie (2/3) 11', 23'

Trafalgar Park, Nelson
Referee: Brendon Pickerill

3 September 2016
17:35 NZST

Wellington	21–17	North Harbour
Pen: Jackson Garden-Bachop (7/7) 22', 31', 40', 44', 53', 59', 64'	Report	Try: Matt McGahan 17'; Brandon Nansen 49'; Con: Matt Vaega (2/2) 18', 50'; Pen: Matt Vaega (1/2) 2'

Wellington Regional Stadium, Wellington
Attendance: 3,696
Referee: Jamie Nutbrown

3 September 2016
19:35 NZST

Northland	34–52	Canterbury
Try: Josh Goodhue (3) 25', 48', 52'; Howard Sililoto 67'; Con: Daniel Hawkins (4/4) 26', 49', 53', 68'; Pen: Daniel Hawkins (2/2) 10', 31'	Report	Try: Marshall Suckling (2) 2', 22'; George Bridge (2) 4', 34'; Johnny McNicholl 8'; Jack Goodhue 39'; Matt Todd 50'; Jordie Barrett 60'; Con: Ben Volavola (2/7) 23', 51'; Richie Mo'unga (1/1) 61'; Pen: Richie Mo'unga (1/1) 73'; Jordie Barrett (1/1) 76'; Cards: Lee Roy Atalifo (yellow card) 74'

Okara Park, Whangārei
Referee: Brett Johnson

4 September 2016
14:35 NZST

Bay of Plenty	32–33	Otago
Try: Lalakai Foketi (3) 8', 20', 66'; Siegfried Fisiihoi 34'; Con: Kelly Haimona (3/4) 9', 21', 35'; Pen: Kelly Haimona (2/3) 12', 60'	Report	Try: Michael Collins 5'; Mitchell Scott 15'; Naulia Dawai 31'; Lee Allan 56'; Con: Scott Eade (2/3) 6', 32'; Fletcher Smith (0/1); Pen: Scott Eade (0/1); Fletcher Smith (2/2) 52', 71'; Drop: Scott Eade (1/1) 46'

Tauranga Domain, Tauranga
Referee: Cameron Stone

4 September 2016
16:35 NZST

RS – Waikato	19–10	Manawatu
Try: Willis Halaholo 55'; Con: Damian McKenzie (1/1) 56'; Pen: Damian McKenzie (4/7) 14', 35', 40', 60'	Report	Try: Ambrose Curtis 24'; Con: Otere Black (1/1) 25'; Pen: Otere Black (1/2) 39'

Waikato Stadium, Hamilton
Referee: Paul Williams

=== Week 4 ===
7 September 2016
19:35 NZST

Hawke's Bay	24–25	Auckland
Try: Ihaia West 13'; Mark Abbott 58'; Con: Ihaia West (1/2) 59'; Pen: Ihaia West (4/5) 8', 38', 71', 77'	Report	Try: Greg Pleasants-Tate 69'; Vince Aso 74'; Con: Simon Hickey (0/2); Pen: Simon Hickey (5/6) 25', 43', 54', 62', 78'

McLean Park, Napier
Referee: Paul Williams

8 September 2016
19:35 NZST

Taranaki	30–14	Southland
Try: Sean Wainui 7'; Ben Matwijow 44'; Lachlan Boshier 66'; Con: Marty McKenzie (3/3) 8', 45', 67'; Pen: Marty McKenzie (3/3) 30', 38', 54'	Report	Try: Jason Rutledge 72'; Con: Greg Dyer (0/1); Pen: Greg Dyer (3/4) 9', 15', 40'

Yarrow Stadium, New Plymouth
Referee: Brett Johnson

9 September 2016
17:45 NZST

Bay of Plenty	52–25	Northland
Try: Jesse Parete (2) 6', 35'; Terrence Hepetema 30'; Joe Tupe (2) 41', 58'; Penalty try 44'; Isaac Te Aute 68'; Te Rangi Fraser 71'; Con: Kelly Haimona (5/7) 7', 31', 42', 45', 59'; Te Aihe Toma (1/1) 72'	Report	Try: Waisea Lawebuka (2) 21', 50'; Matt Talaese 77'; Con: Peter Breen (1/2) 51'; Daniel Hawkins (1/1) 78'; Pen: Peter Breen (2/2) 9', 28'; Cards: Tom Robinson (yellow card) 33'; Shane Neville (yellow card) 46'

Rotorua International Stadium, Rotorua
Referee: Angus Mabey

9 September 2016
19:35 NZST

Counties Manukau	27–28	Wellington
Try: Luteru Laulala (2) 29', 37'; Kalolo Tuiloma 56'; Con: Piers Francis (3/3) 30', 38', 57'; Pen: Piers Francis (2/3) 13', 49'	Report	Try: Leni Apisai (2) 10', 51'; Jackson Garden-Bachop 66'; Con: Jackson Garden-Bachop (2/3) 52', 67'; Pen: Jackson Garden-Bachop (3/5) 22', 35', 80'; Cards: Isaia Walker-Leawere (yellow card) 28'

ECOLight Stadium, Pukekohe
Referee: Michael Lash

10 September 2016
14:35 NZST

North Harbour	29–25	Manawatu
Try: Matt Duffie 2'; Tevita Li 17'; Michael Little 33'; Con: Bryn Gatland (1/3) 34'; Pen: Bryn Gatland (4/4) 43', 55', 63', 66'	Report	Try: Ngani Laumape (2) 4', 27'; Chris Eves 49'; Con: Otere Black (2/3) 28', 50'; Pen: Otere Black (2/3) 59', 74'

North Harbour Stadium, Albany
Referee: James Doleman

10 September 2016
16:35 NZST

Otago	30–27	Tasman
Try: Paul Grant 4'; Craig Millar 12'; Naulia Dawai 37'; Con: Fletcher Smith (3/3) 5', 13', 38'; Pen: Fletcher Smith (3/3) 47', 63', 72'; Cards: Jonathan Ruru (yellow card) 30'	Report	Try: Alex Nankivell 22'; David Havili 28'; Shane Christie 40'; Con: Marty Banks (3/3) 23', 29', 40'; Pen: Marty Banks (2/3) 16', 34'

Forsyth Barr Stadium, Dunedin
Referee: Mike Fraser

11 September 2016
14:35 NZST

Canterbury	63–7	Hawke's Bay
Try: George Bridge 5'; Scott Barrett 39'; Dominic Bird 44'; Ben Funnell 53'; Nathan Earle 66'; Rob Thompson (2) 68', 76'; Jordie Barrett 72'; Con: Richie Mo'unga (4/4) 6', 40', 45', 54'; Ben Volavola (0/1); Jordie Barrett (3/3) 69', 73', 77'; Pen: Richie Mo'unga (3/3) 2', 21', 27'	Report	Try: Jonah Lowe 24'; Con: Ihaia West (1/1) 25'; Cards: Jonah Lowe (yellow card) 30'

Rugby League Park, Christchurch
Referee: Richard Kelly

11 September 2016
16:35 NZST

Auckland	32–35	Waikato
Try: Blake Gibson (2) 31', 74'; Greg Pleasants-Tate 35'; Patrick Tuipulotu 77'; Con: Simon Hickey (3/4) 32', 75', 77'; Pen: Simon Hickey (2/2) 40', 50'	Report	Try: Loni Uhila 4'; Sevu Reece 15'; Epalahame Faiva 55'; Iliesa Ratuva Tavuyara (2) 65', 71'; Con: Damian McKenzie (2/5) 5', 66'; Pen: Damian McKenzie (2/3) 13', 53'; Cards: Loni Uhila (yellow card) 28'

Eden Park, Auckland
Attendance: 6,000
Referee: Ben O'Keeffe

=== Week 5 ===
14 September 2016
19:35 NZST

Counties Manukau	29–30	Taranaki
Try: Sione Molia 8'; Jordan Taufua 42'; Sherwin Stowers 45'; Richard Judd 67'; Con: Piers Francis (1/1) 9'; Joe Reynolds (2/3) 43', 68'; Pen: Joe Reynolds (1/3) 74'	Report	Try: Sean Wainui 2'; Stephen Perofeta 38'; Mitchell Crosswell 71'; Con: Marty McKenzie (3/3) 3', 39', 72'; Pen: Marty McKenzie (3/4) 22', 30', 76'

ECOLight Stadium, Pukekohe
Referee: Jamie Nutbrown

15 September 2016
19:35 NZST

Southland	29–43	Hawke's Bay
Try: Peni Ravai 58'; Tauasosi Tuimavave 75'; Con: Wharenui Hawera (1/1) 59'; Tauasosi Tuimavave (1/1) 76'; Pen: Wharenui Hawera (5/5) 3', 22', 36', 40', 49'; Cards: Mikaele Mafi (yellow card) 38'	Report	Try: Brad Weber 12'; Ash Dixon 41'; Mathew Skipwith-Garland 44'; Mason Emerson 64'; Tony Lamborn 69'; Ihaia West 72'; Con: Ihaia West (4/4) 13', 65', 70', 73'; Tiaan Falcon (1/2) 45'; Pen: Ihaia West (1/3) 39'; Cards: Ihaia West (yellow card) 40'

Rugby Park Stadium, Invercargill
Referee: Glen Jackson

16 September 2016
17:45 NZST

Tasman	33–23	Northland
Try: Tevita Koloamatangi 23'; Quinten Strange 33'; Shannon Frizell 62'; Con: Marty Banks (3/3) 24', 34', 63'; Pen: Marty Banks (4/4) 26', 28', 74', 79'	Report	Try: Matthew Matich 38'; Kara Pryor 65'; Con: Daniel Hawkins (2/2) 39', 66'; Pen: Daniel Hawkins (3/3) 44', 47', 52'; Cards: Howard Sililoto (yellow card) 79'

Trafalgar Park, Nelson
Referee: Brendon Pickerill

16 September 2016
19:35 NZST

Wellington	24–10	Bay of Plenty
Try: Reggie Goodes (2) 14', 44'; Peter Umaga-Jensen 17'; Wes Goosen 23'; Con: Jackson Garden-Bachop (2/4) 18', 45'; Pen: Jackson Garden-Bachop (0/1)	Report	Try: Terrence Hepetema 54'; Con: Daniel Hollinshead (1/1) 55'; Pen: Luke Campbell (1/1) 21'

Wellington Regional Stadium, Wellington
Attendance: 1,713
Referee: James Doleman

17 September 2016
14:35 NZST

Otago	24–13	North Harbour
Try: Craig Millar 12'; Sam Anderson-Heather 45'; Con: Fletcher Smith (1/2) 46'; Pen: Fletcher Smith (4/4) 4', 10', 21', 55'	Report	Try: Matt Vaega 28'; Con: Bryn Gatland (1/1) 29'; Pen: Bryn Gatland (2/3) 8', 36'

Forsyth Barr Stadium, Dunedin
Referee: Kane McBride

17 September 2016
16:35 NZST

Manawatu	19–13	Canterbury
Try: Jackson Hemopo 77'; Con: Otere Black (1/1) 78'; Pen: Otere Black (4/4) 9', 31', 39', 65'	Report	Try: George Bridge 60'; Con: Richie Mo'unga (1/1) 61'; Pen: Richie Mo'unga (2/3) 17', 28'; Cards: Luke Whitelock (yellow card) 47'

Arena Manawatu, Palmerston North
Referee: Paul Williams

18 September 2016
14:35 NZST

Auckland	26–30	Counties Manukau
Try: Greg Pleasants-Tate 59'; Latiume Fosita 74'; Con: Simon Hickey (2/2) 60', 75'; Pen: Simon Hickey (4/4) 37', 40', 48', 66'	Report	Try: Viliame Rarasea 17'; Gafatasi Su'a 27'; Sione Fifita 52'; Augustine Pulu 78'; Con: Piers Francis (2/4) 18', 79'; Pen: Piers Francis (2/4) 6', 69'

Eden Park, Auckland
Attendance: 3,400
Referee: Shane McDermott

18 September 2016
16:35 NZST

RS – Waikato	20–20	Taranaki
Try: Sevu Reece (2) 39', 42'; Tyler Campbell 65'; Con: Sam Christie (1/3) 43'; Pen: Sam Christie (1/1) 73'; Cards: Tawera Kerr-Barlow (yellow card) 7'	Report	Try: Johnny Fa'auli 28'; Toa Halafihi (2) 45', 58'; Con: Marty McKenzie (1/3) 45'; Pen: Marty McKenzie (1/1) 11'

Waikato Stadium, Hamilton
Referee: Ben O'Keeffe

=== Week 6 ===
21 September 2016
19:35 NZST

Southland	20–16	Bay of Plenty
Try: James Schrader 48'; Jimmy Cowan 55'; Con: Wharenui Hawera (2/2) 49', 56'; Pen: Wharenui Hawera (2/3) 3', 71'	Report	Try: Aidan Ross 17'; Joe Tupe 35'; Con: Kelly Haimona (0/1); Daniel Hollinshead (0/1); Pen: Kelly Haimona (1/2) 1'; Daniel Hollinshead (1/2) 60'; Cards: Solomona Sakalia (yellow card) 70'

Rugby Park Stadium, Invercargill
Referee: Ben O'Keeffe

22 September 2016
19:35 NZST

Northland	21–29	Wellington
Try: Solomon Alaimalo 24'; Matthew Matich 59'; Shane Neville 69'; Con: Peter Breen (3/3) 25', 60', 70'; Pen: Peter Breen (0/1); Cards: Kara Pryor (yellow card) 42'	Report	Try: Hoani Matenga 3'; Asafo Aumua (3) 13', 46', 51'; Con: Jackson Garden-Bachop (3/4) 4', 14', 52'; Pen: Jackson Garden-Bachop (1/1) 8'

Okara Park, Whangārei
Referee: Mike Fraser

23 September 2016
19:35 NZST

Counties Manukau	35–26	Waikato
Try: Kalolo Tuiloma (3) 3', 11', 17'; Gafatasi Su'a 43'; Sione Fifita 63'; Con: Piers Francis (2/5) 4', 18'; Pen: Piers Francis (2/2) 34', 61'	Report	Try: Iliesa Ratuva Tavuyara 25'; Brad Tucker 54'; Steven Misa 68'; Jason Robertson 75'; Con: Sam Christie (1/2) 55'; Jason Robertson (2/2) 69', 76'; Pen: Sam Christie (0/1)

ECOLight Stadium, Pukekohe
Referee: Cameron Stone

24 September 2016
14:35 NZST

Canterbury	45–34	Otago
Try: Alex Hodgman 10'; Rob Thompson 25'; Nathan Earle 30'; Billy Harmon 34'; Johnny McNicholl 42'; David McDuling 47'; Nathan Vella 75'; Con: Richie Mo'unga (5/7) 11', 26', 43', 48', 76'	Report	Try: Fa'asiu Fuatai 40'; Teihorangi Walden 60'; Paul Grant 72'; Naulia Dawai 80'; Con: Fletcher Smith (1/1) 40'; Scott Eade (3/3) 61', 73', 80'; Pen: Fletcher Smith (2/2) 14', 28'

Rugby League Park, Christchurch
Referee: Brendon Pickerill

24 September 2016
17:35 NZST

Taranaki	30–19	Manawatu
Try: Reuben O'Neill 13'; Kylem O'Donnell 25'; Latu Vaeno 67'; Rhys Marshall 74'; Con: Marty McKenzie (2/4) 14', 75'; Pen: Marty McKenzie (2/4) 36', 78'	Report	Try: Ambrose Curtis 34'; Con: Otere Black (1/1) 35'; Pen: Otere Black (4/4) 2', 9', 40', 68'

Yarrow Stadium, New Plymouth
Referee: Brett Johnson

24 September 2016
19:35 NZST

Hawke's Bay	29–36	Tasman
Try: Trent Boswell-Wakefield 15'; Tony Lamborn 65'; Jason Long 70'; Jonah Lowe 77'; Con: Ihaia West (2/3) 66', 71'; Jonah Lowe (1/1) 78'; Pen: Ihaia West (1/1) 26'; Cards: Ash Dixon (yellow card) 60'	Report	Try: Tima Fainga'anuku 9'; Pete Samu 20'; Kieron Fonotia 31'; Marty Banks 54'; Caleb Makene 75'; Con: Marty Banks (4/5) 10', 21', 32', 55'; Pen: Marty Banks (1/2) 6'

McLean Park, Napier
Referee: Angus Mabey

25 September 2016
14:35 NZST

North Harbour	35–14	Southland
Try: Tevita Li (2) 33', 80'; Gerard Cowley-Tuioti 54'; Chris Vui 75'; Con: Bryn Gatland (2/2) 34', 55'; Matt McGahan (1/2) 76'; Pen: Bryn Gatland (3/3) 10', 20', 25'	Report	Try: Peni Ravai 72'; Con: Wharenui Hawera (0/1); Pen: Wharenui Hawera (3/4) 6', 28', 36'; Cards: Jimmy Cowan (yellow card) 14'

North Harbour Stadium, Albany
Referee: Richard Kelly

25 September 2016
16:35 NZST

Bay of Plenty	38–44	Auckland
Try: Shahn Eru 3'; Teddy Stanaway (2) 11', 76'; Joe Tupe (3) 29', 57', 69'; Con: Kelly Haimona (2/3) 4', 30'; Daniel Hollinshead (2/3) 58', 70'; Pen: Kelly Haimona (0/2)	Report	Try: Rieko Ioane (3) 22', 40', 53'; Lolagi Visinia 34'; Simon Hickey 48'; Melani Nanai 71'; Con: Simon Hickey (4/5) 23', 40', 49', 54'; Latiume Fosita (0/1); Pen: Simon Hickey (2/2) 5', 20'

Rotorua International Stadium, Rotorua
Referee: Kane McBride

=== Week 7 ===
28 September 2016
19:35 NZST

Waikato	23–29	Canterbury – RS
Try: Jordan Manihera 13'; Whetu Douglas 28'; Iliesa Ratuva Tavuyara 66'; Con: Jordan Trainor (1/3) 29'; Pen: Jordan Trainor (2/2) 44', 51'	Report	Try: Ben Funnell 22'; Johnny McNicholl 31'; Con: Richie Mo'unga (2/2) 23', 32'; Pen: Richie Mo'unga (2/2) 10', 18'; Jordie Barrett (3/3) 62', 70', 76'

Waikato Stadium, Hamilton
Referee: Nick Briant

29 September 2016
19:35 NZST

Tasman	15–10	Counties Manukau
Pen: Marty Banks (5/8) 14', 18', 25', 37', 71'	Report	Try: Jimmy Tupou 28'; Con: Piers Francis (1/1) 29'; Pen: Piers Francis (1/2) 40'; Luteru Laulala (0/1); Cards: Augustine Pulu (yellow card) 31'

Lansdowne Park, Blenheim
Referee: Jamie Nutbrown

30 September 2016
19:35 NZST

Wellington	60–21	Southland
Try: Vaea Fifita 16'; Greg Foe 22'; Matt Proctor 31'; Wes Goosen 33'; Jason Woodward 38'; Malo Tuitama (2) 51', 70'; Asafo Aumua 61'; Galu Taufale 64'; Con: Jackson Garden-Bachop (6/9) 17', 23', 32', 34', 39', 65'; Pen: Jackson Garden-Bachop (1/1) 14'	Report	Try: Jahvis Wallace 9'; Wharenui Hawera 28'; Keanu Kahukura 80'; Con: Wharenui Hawera (2/2) 10', 29'; Greg Dyer (1/1) 80'; Pen: Wharenui Hawera (0/1)

Wellington Regional Stadium, Wellington
Attendance: 2,243
Referee: Kane McBride

1 October 2016
14:35 NZST

North Harbour	44–34	Bay of Plenty
Try: Chris Vui 30'; Tevita Li (2) 36', 43'; Matt Vaega 49'; Nic Mayhew 55'; Matt Duffie 63'; Con: Bryn Gatland (4/6) 31', 37', 56', 64'; Pen: Bryn Gatland (2/3) 4', 14'	Report	Try: Teddy Stanaway 18'; Monty Ioane 45'; Henry Stowers 59'; Joe Royal 68'; Jesse Parete 75'; Con: Daniel Hollinshead (3/5) 19', 46', 76'; Pen: Daniel Hollinshead (1/2) 9'

North Harbour Stadium, Albany
Referee: Ben O'Keeffe

1 October 2016
17:35 NZST

Manawatu	21–30	Hawke's Bay
Try: Travis Taylor (2) 27', 54'; Timothy Cadwallader 69'; Con: Otere Black (0/3); Pen: Otere Black (2/4) 9', 13'	Report	Try: Mark Abbott 51'; Robbie Fruean 66'; Con: Ihaia West (1/2) 52'; Pen: Ihaia West (6/6) 39', 44', 48', 58', 64', 77'

Arena Manawatu, Palmerston North
Referee: Michael Lash

1 October 2016
19:35 NZST

Auckland	54–17	Otago
Try: Rieko Ioane (3) 9', 46', 74'; Taleni Seu 22'; Lolagi Visinia 30'; Melani Nanai 36'; Simon Hickey 42'; Con: Simon Hickey (5/7) 10', 23', 43', 47', 75'; Pen: Simon Hickey (3/3) 28', 49', 60'	Report	Try: Donald Brighouse 39'; Jonah Aoina 79'; Con: Fletcher Smith (1/1) 40'; Scott Eade (1/1) 80'; Pen: Fletcher Smith (1/1) 13'

Eden Park, Auckland
Attendance: 3,700
Referee: Brendon Pickerill

2 October 2016
14:35 NZST

Taranaki	34–39	Canterbury
Try: Rhys Marshall 26'; Iopu Iopu-Aso 38'; Stephen Perofeta 73'; Toa Halafihi 79'; Con: Marty McKenzie (1/2) 27'; Stephen Perofeta (0/2); Pen: Marty McKenzie (4/4) 4', 12', 57', 60'; Cards: Mitchell Brown (yellow card) 37'	Report	Try: Jack Stratton 17'; Luke Whitelock (2) 30', 66'; Jordie Barrett 46'; Richie Mo'unga 69'; Con: Jordie Barrett (4/5) 18', 31', 47', 67'; Pen: Jordie Barrett (2/2) 22', 77'

Yarrow Stadium, New Plymouth
Referee: Glen Jackson

2 October 2016
16:35 NZST

Northland	48–27	Waikato
Try: Jordan Hyland 6'; Phil Kite 17'; Matthew Matich 30'; Jone Macilai-Tori 39'; Daniel Hawkins 77'; Con: Peter Breen (4/5) 18', 31', 40', 78'; Pen: Peter Breen (5/5) 11', 21', 56', 65', 69'	Report	Try: Jordan Trainor 35'; Iliesa Ratuva Tavuyara 42'; Sefo Kautai 51'; Whetu Douglas 73'; Con: Jordan Trainor (2/4) 43', 52'; Pen: Jordan Trainor (1/1) 15'

Okara Park, Whangārei
Referee: Shane McDermott

=== Week 8 ===
5 October 2016
19:35 NZST

Manawatu	50–28	Wellington
Try: Jason Emery (2) 10', 55'; Antonio Kiri Kiri (4) 22', 35', 43', 73'; Chris Eves 46'; Callum Gibbins 65'; Con: Otere Black (5/8) 23', 44', 56', 66', 74'	Report	Try: Wes Goosen 17'; Hoani Matenga 52'; Jason Woodward 61'; Galu Taufale 77'; Con: Jackson Garden-Bachop (4/4) 18', 53', 62', 78'; Cards: Sam Lousi (yellow card) 71'

Arena Manawatu, Palmerston North
Referee: Richard Kelly

6 October 2016
19:35 NZST

Auckland	31–49	Tasman
Try: Scott Scrafton 18'; Pryor Collier 23'; Lolagi Visinia (2) 33', 50'; Con: Simon Hickey (4/4) 19', 23', 33', 51'; Pen: Simon Hickey (1/2) 39'	Report	Try: Pete Samu 9'; Tim Perry 31'; David Havili 43'; Quinten Strange 70'; Con: Marty Banks (4/4) 10', 32', 44', 71'; Pen: Marty Banks (6/6) 3', 28', 40', 52', 56', 80'; David Havili (1/1) 60'

Eden Park, Auckland
Attendance: 2,400
Referee: Glen Jackson

7 October 2016
19:35 NZST

RS – Canterbury	47–18	North Harbour
Try: Tom Sanders 10'; George Bridge 18'; Jack Goodhue 56'; Richie Mo'unga 66'; Nathan Vella 68'; Jack Stratton 80'; Con: Jordie Barrett (3/4) 19', 57', 67'; Richie Mo'unga (1/1) 69'; Johnny McNicholl (0/1); Pen: Jordie Barrett (3/3) 4', 46', 50'	Report	Try: Matt Vaega 7'; Sione Mafileo 27'; Con: Bryn Gatland (1/2) 28'; Pen: Bryn Gatland (2/2) 32', 43'

Rugby League Park, Christchurch
Referee: Ben O'Keeffe

8 October 2016
14:35 NZST

Southland	39–31	Northland
Try: James Schrader (2) 5', 73'; Michael Molloy 22'; Phil Hadler 58'; Tauasosi Tuimavave 70'; Con: Wharenui Hawera (2/3) 6', 59'; Greg Dyer (2/2) 71', 74'; Pen: Wharenui Hawera (1/2) 42'; Drop: Jimmy Cowan (1/1) 55'		Try: Phil Kite 12'; Peter Breen 27'; Shane Neville 53'; Aorangi Stokes 78'; Jone Macilai-Tori 80'; Con: Peter Breen (3/5) 28', 54', 79'

Rugby Park Stadium, Invercargill
Referee: James Doleman

8 October 2016
17:35 NZST

Otago	14–16	Counties Manukau
Try: Craig Millar 18'; Naulia Dawai 52'; Con: Scott Eade (2/2) 19', 53'	Report	Try: Jimmy Tupou 12'; Con: Piers Francis (1/1) 13'; Pen: Piers Francis (1/4) 36'; Joe Reynolds (2/2) 67', 80'

Forsyth Barr Stadium, Dunedin
Referee: Nick Briant

8 October 2016
19:35 NZST

Waikato	46–22	Hawke's Bay
Try: Iliesa Ratuva Tavuyara (2) 6', 70'; Willis Halaholo 27'; Tau Koloamatangi 36'; Jordan Trainor 54'; Jason Robertson 77'; Con: Jordan Trainor (5/6) 7', 28', 37', 55', 78'; Pen: Jordan Trainor (2/2) 19', 40'; Cards: Tevita Taufuʻi (yellow card) 44'	Report	Try: Penalty try 45'; Tony Lamborn 58'; Mason Emerson 63'; Con: Ihaia West (2/3) 46', 64'; Pen: Ihaia West (1/1) 23'

Waikato Stadium, Hamilton
Referee: Brendon Pickerill

9 October 2016
14:35 NZST

Wellington	31–54	Taranaki
Try: Alex Fidow 60'; Joe Hill 66'; James Blackwell 77'; Mark Reddish 80'; Con: Jackson Garden-Bachop (4/4) 61', 67', 78', 80'; Pen: Jackson Garden-Bachop (1/1) 5'	Report	Try: Iopu Iopu-Aso 10'; Stephen Perofeta (3) 27', 57', 73'; Toa Halafihi 43'; Seta Tamanivalu 52'; Jackson Ormond 63'; Con: Marty McKenzie (4/5) 11', 28', 44', 58'; Stephen Perofeta (1/2) 74'; Pen: Marty McKenzie (3/3) 17', 36', 50'; Cards: Jared Proffit (yellow card) 59'

Wellington Regional Stadium, Wellington
Attendance: 3,150
Referee: Angus Mabey

9 October 2016
16:35 NZST

Bay of Plenty	38–33	Manawatu
Try: Aidan Ross 13'; Jesse Parete 38'; Te Aihe Toma 54'; Henry Stowers 60'; Shahn Eru 67'; Con: Daniel Hollinshead (5/5) 14', 39', 55', 61', 68'; Pen: Daniel Hollinshead (1/1) 80'; Cards: Culum Retallick (yellow card) 23'	Report	Try: Penalty try 22'; Jason Emery 27'; Jamie Booth 44'; Ambrose Curtis 65'; Heiden Bedwell-Curtis 76'; Con: Otere Black (4/5) 23', 28', 45', 66'; Pen: Otere Black (0/1)

Rotorua International Stadium, Rotorua
Referee: Cameron Stone

=== Week 9 ===
12 October 2016
19:35 NZST

North Harbour	27–27	Tasman
Try: Matt McGahan 17'; Matt Vaega 54'; Adrian Smith 69'; Con: Bryn Gatland (3/3) 18', 55', 70'; Pen: Bryn Gatland (2/3) 7', 39'	Report	Try: David Havili 13'; Andrew Makalio 63'; Shannon Frizell 75'; Con: Marty Banks (3/3) 14', 64', 76'; Pen: Marty Banks (2/3) 33', 40'; Cards: Kieron Fonotia (yellow card) 53'; Ethan Blackadder (yellow card) 68'

North Harbour Stadium, Albany
Referee: Kane McBride

13 October 2016
19:35 NZST

Taranaki	35–32	Auckland
Try: Marty McKenzie 18'; Seta Tamanivalu 36'; Rhys Marshall 52'; Ben Matwijow 68'; Toa Halafihi 79'; Con: Marty McKenzie (2/5) 69', 80'; Pen: Marty McKenzie (2/2) 26', 61'; Cards: Kylem O'Donnell (yellow card) 71'	Report	Try: Melani Nanai 4'; Rieko Ioane (2) 12', 39'; Penalty try 72'; Con: Simon Hickey (3/4) 13', 40', 73'; Pen: Simon Hickey (2/2) 48', 67'; Cards: Scott Scrafton (yellow card) 57'

Yarrow Stadium, New Plymouth
Referee: Shane McDermott

14 October 2016
19:35 NZST

Manawatu	14–21	Otago
Try: Ngani Laumape 26'; Jamie Booth 71'; Con: Otere Black (2/2) 27', 72'	Report	Try: Tony Ensor 9'; Matt Faddes 12'; Adam Knight 35'; Con: Scott Eade (0/3); Pen: Scott Eade (1/2) 30'; Fletcher Smith (1/1) 62'; Cards: Joshua Dickson (yellow card) 23'

Arena Manawatu, Palmerston North
Referee: Glen Jackson

15 October 2016
14:35 NZST

Counties Manukau	33–21	Canterbury
Try: Toni Pulu (2) 31', 62'; Pauliasi Manu 48'; Cardiff Vaega 65'; Richard Judd 72'; Con: Piers Francis (1/1) 32'; Luteru Laulala (3/4) 49', 63'; Cards: Sione Fifita (yellow card) 44'	Report	Try: Daniel Lienert-Brown 52'; Nathan Earle 79'; Con: Jordie Barrett (1/2) 53'; Pen: Jordie Barrett (3/3) 25', 24', 46'; Cards: Ben Funnell (yellow card) 30'

ECOLight Stadium, Pukekohe
Referee: Mike Fraser

15 October 2016
17:35 NZST

Hawke's Bay	24–26	Bay of Plenty
Try: Brad Weber 30'; Jonah Lowe (2) 77', 79'; Con: Ihaia West (3/3) 31', 78', 79'; Pen: Ihaia West (1/1) 35'	Report	Try: Te Aihe Toma 25'; Lalakai Foketi 43'; Solomona Sakalia 51'; Penalty try 72'; Con: Daniel Hollinshead (3/4) 26', 52', 73'; Cards: Henry Stowers (yellow card) 76'

McLean Park, Napier
Referee: Paul Williams

15 October 2016
19:35 NZST

Wellington	24–28	Waikato
Try: Vaea Fifita 15'; Hoani Matenga 19'; Reggie Goodes 28'; Asafo Aumua 62'; Con: Jackson Garden-Bachop (2/4) 20', 63'; Cards: Tomasi Palu (yellow card) 56'	Report	Try: Adam Burn 9'; Jordan Manihera 39'; Sevu Reece 71'; Stephen Donald 76'; Con: Damian McKenzie (4/4) 10', 40', 72', 77'

Wellington Regional Stadium, Wellington
Attendance: 1,980
Referee: Brendon Pickerill

16 October 2016
14:35 NZST

Tasman	56–0	Southland
Try: Pete Samu 8'; Andrew Makalio 14'; James Lowe 25'; Viliami Lolohea 47'; Jesse MacDonald 56'; Alex Nankivell 60'; Alex Ainley 66'; Caleb Makene 80'; Con: Mitchell Hunt (5/5) 9', 15', 26', 48', 57'; Tim O'Malley (3/3) 61', 67', 80'	Report

Trafalgar Park, Nelson
Referee: Angus Mabey

16 October 2016
16:35 NZST

Northland	28–44	North Harbour
Try: Epineri Uluiviti 2'; Ross Wright 61'; Solomon Alaimalo 70'; Waisea Lawebuka 78'; Con: Peter Breen (4/4) 3', 62', 71', 79'; Cards: Daniel Hawkins (yellow card) 26'	Report	Try: Matt Duffie (2) 10', 33'; Tevita Li 27'; Michael Little 36'; Connor Collett 52'; Karl Tu'inukuafe 72'; Con: Bryn Gatland (3/5) 11', 34', 37'; Matt McGahan (1/1) 73'; Pen: Bryn Gatland (2/3) 8', 12'; Cards: Afa Fa'atau (yellow card) 70'

Okara Park, Whangārei
Referee: Nick Briant

== Play-offs ==
Championship

Semi-finals
1	Otago	27
4	Bay of Plenty	20
2	Wellington	37
3	North Harbour	40

Final
1	Otago	14
3	North Harbour	17

Premiership

Semi-finals
1	Canterbury	22
4	Counties Manukau	7
2	Taranaki	29
3	Tasman	41

Final
1	Canterbury	43
3	Tasman	27

=== Semi-finals ===
==== Championship ====
21 October 2016
19:35 NZST

Otago	27–20	Bay of Plenty
Try: Franklin 6' c Dawai 21' c Lentjes 41' c Con: Smith (3/3) 7', 22', 42'; Pen: Smith (1/2) 57'; Eade (1/1) 71'; Cards: Franklin (yellow card) 62'	Report	Try: Foketi 46' c Hepetema 76' c Con: Hollinshead (1/1) 46'; Toma (1/1) 77'; Pen: Hollinshead (1/1) 4', 19'

Forsyth Barr Stadium, Dunedin
Referee: Brendon Pickerill

22 October 2016
14:35 NZST

Wellington	37–40	North Harbour
Try: Apisai 11' c Goosen 25' m Hill 58' m Aumua 66' c Rangihuna 80' c Con: Garden-Bachop (3/5) 12', 68', 80'; Pen: Garden-Bachop (2/2) 19', 22'	Report	Try: Li 4' c Preston 40' c Mayhew 41' c Hilton-Jones 70' c Con: Gatland (4/4) 5', 40', 42', 71'; Pen: Gatland (4/5) 3', 14', 50', 76'

Westpac Stadium, Wellington
Attendance: 2,528
Referee: Paul Williams

==== Premiership ====
23 October 2016
14:05 NZST

Canterbury	22–7	Counties Manukau
Try: Funnell 22' c Barrett 37' c Stratton 68' m Con: Barrett (2/3) 23', 38'; Pen: Barrett (1/1) 1'	Report	Try: Taufua 61' c Con: Laulala (1/1) 62'; Pen: Laulala (0/1)

AMI Stadium, Christchurch
Referee: Ben O'Keeffe

23 October 2016
16:35 NZST

Taranaki	29–41	Tasman
Try: Tamanivalu 3' m Fa'auli 31' c Tahuriorangi 50' c O'Donnell 64' m Crosswell 71' m Con: McKenzie (2/5) 32', 51'	Report	Try: Geldenhuys 19' c Nankivell 35' c Hunt 37' c Guyton 46' c Banks 79' c Con: Banks (5/5) 20', 36', 38', 47', 80'; Pen: Banks (2/2) 14', 54'

Yarrow Stadium, New Plymouth
Referee: Mike Fraser

=== Finals ===
==== Championship ====
28 October 2016
19:35 NZST

Otago	14–17	North Harbour
Try: Fuatai 1' c Franklin 47' c Con: Smith (2/2) 2', 49'; Pen: Eade (0/2)	Report	Try: Little 17' m Con: Gatland (0/1); Pen: Gatland (3/4) 28', 42', 40'; Drop: Gatland (1/1) 79'; Cards: Preston (yellow card) 14'

Forsyth Barr Stadium, Dunedin
Referee: Nick Briant

==== Premiership ====
29 October 2016
19:35 NZST

Canterbury	43–27	Tasman
Try: McDuling 1' m Earle 5' c Mo'unga (2) 24' c, 59' c Thompson 45' c Harmon 68' c Con: Barrett (5/6) 6', 25', 46', 60', 69'; Pen: Barrett (1/3) 30'	Report	Try: Frizell 19' c Guyton 55' c MacDonald 62' c Con: Banks (3/3) 20', 56', 63'; Pen: Banks (2/2) 9', 17'

AMI Stadium, Christchurch
Referee: Glen Jackson

FB	15	Johnny McNicholl
RW	14	Nathan Earle	(yellow card) 10'	(substituted off) 74'
OC	13	Jordie Barrett
IC	12	Rob Thompson		(substituted off) 70'
LW	11	George Bridge
FH	10	Richie Mo'unga
SH	9	Ere Enari		(substituted off) 61'
N8	8	Luke Whitelock (c)
OF	7	Tom Sanders		(substituted off) 74'
BF	6	Reed Prinsep		(substituted off) 60'	(substituted on) 76'
RL	5	Dominic Bird
LL	4	David McDuling
TP	3	Siate Tokolahi		(substituted off) 71'
HK	2	Ben Funnell		(substituted off) 63'	(substituted on) 74'
LP	1	Daniel Lienert-Brown		(substituted off) 49'
Replacements:
HK	16	Nathan Vella		(substituted on) 63'	(substituted off) 74'
PR	17	Alex Hodgman		(substituted on) 49'
PR	18	Oliver Jager		(substituted on) 71'
FL	19	Jed Brown		(substituted on) 74'
FL	20	Billy Harmon		(substituted on) 60'	(substituted off) 76'
SH	21	Jack Stratton		(substituted on) 61'
CE	22	Inga Finau		(substituted on) 70'
FB	23	Ben Volavola		(substituted on) 74'

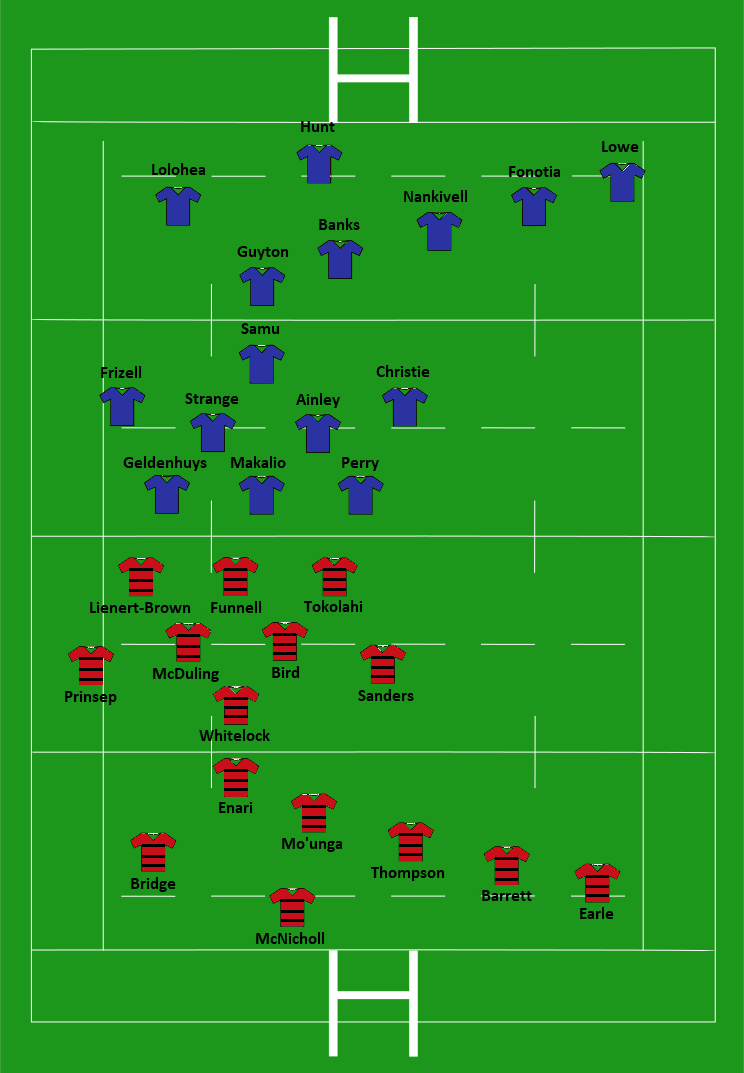

FB	15	Mitchell Hunt
RW	14	Viliami Lolohea
OC	13	Kieron Fonotia		(substituted off) 42'
IC	12	Alex Nankivell
LW	11	James Lowe
FH	10	Marty Banks		(substituted off) 69'
SH	9	Billy Guyton		(substituted off) 63'
N8	8	Pete Samu		(substituted off) 71'
OF	7	Shane Christie (c)
BF	6	Shannon Frizell
RL	5	Quinten Strange		(substituted off) 57'
LL	4	Alex Ainley	(yellow card) 40'
TP	3	Ross Geldenhuys		(substituted off) 47'
HK	2	Andrew Makalio		(substituted off) 61'
LP	1	Tim Perry		(substituted off) 47'
Replacements:
HK	16	Jesse MacDonald		(substituted on) 61'
PR	17	Kane Hames		(substituted on) 47'
PR	18	Siosiua Halanukonuka		(substituted on) 47'
LK	19	Pari Pari Parkinson		(substituted on) 57'
FL	20	Ethan Blackadder		(substituted on) 71'
SH	21	Finlay Christie		(substituted on) 63'
CE	22	David Havili		(substituted on) 42'
FB	23	Caleb Makene		(substituted on) 69'

== Statistics ==
=== Leading point scorers ===
No.	Player	Team	Points	Average	Details
1	Marty Banks	Tasman	161	16.10	2 T, 26 C, 33 P, 0 D
2	Marty McKenzie	Taranaki	145	13.18	2 T, 30 C, 25 P, 0 D
3	Simon Hickey	Auckland	143	14.30	2 T, 29 C, 25 P, 0 D
4	Bryn Gatland	North Harbour	123	10.25	0 T, 21 C, 26 P, 1 D
5	Jordie Barrett	Canterbury	123	10.25	5 T, 22 C, 18 P, 0 D
6	Jackson Garden-Bachop	Wellington	122	12.20	2 T, 32 C, 16 P, 0 D
7	Ihaia West	Hawke's Bay	109	10.90	3 T, 23 C, 16 P, 0 D
8	Fletcher Smith	Otago	106	8.83	0 T, 20 C, 22 P, 0 D
9	Otere Black	Manawatu	89	8.90	0 T, 22 C, 15 P, 0 D
10	Richie Mo'unga	Canterbury	88	8.00	5 T, 18 C, 9 P, 0 D

Source: The weekly reviews of the matches published on provincial.rugby (see "Report" in the individual match scoring stats).

=== Leading try scorers ===
No.	Player	Team	Tries	Average
1	Rieko Ioane	Auckland	10	1.00
2	Joe Tupe	Bay of Plenty	7	0.64
3	Tevita Li	North Harbour	7	0.58
4	Ngani Laumape	Manawatu	7	0.70
5	Iliesa Ratuva Tavuyara	Waikato	7	0.70
6	Asafo Aumua	Wellington	6	0.55
7	Naulia Dawai	Otago	6	0.50
8	Jordan Taufua	Countis Manukau	6	0.55
9	Lalakai Foketi	Bay of Plenty	6	0.55
10	Jonah Lowe	Hawke's Bay	5	0.50

Source: The weekly reviews of the matches published on provincial.rugby (see "Report" in the individual match scoring stats).

=== Points by week ===
Team	1		2		3		4		5		6		7		8		9		Total		Average	
Auckland	3	43	37	15	51	16	57	59	26	30	44	38	54	17	31	49	32	35	335	302	33.50	30.20
Bay of Plenty	22	30	34	39	32	33	52	25	10	24	54	64	34	44	38	33	26	24	302	316	30.20	31.60
Canterbury	43	3	45	14	52	34	63	7	13	19	45	34	68	57	47	18	21	33	397	219	39.70	21.90
Counties Manukau	17	20	39	34	48	20	27	28	59	56	35	26	10	15	16	14	33	21	284	234	28.40	23.40
Hawke's Bay	26	36	28	55	20	48	31	88	43	29	29	36	30	21	22	46	24	26	253	385	25.30	38.50
Manawatu	34	27	34	31	10	19	25	29	19	13	19	30	21	30	83	66	14	21	259	266	25.90	26.60
North Harbour	20	17	15	26	17	21	29	25	13	24	35	14	44	34	18	47	71	55	262	263	26.20	26.30
Northland	27	34	15	37	62	85	25	52	23	33	21	29	48	27	31	39	28	44	280	380	28.00	38.00
Otago	40	17	44	21	66	60	30	27	24	13	34	45	17	54	14	16	21	14	290	267	29.00	26.70
Southland	17	40	31	34	16	51	14	30	29	43	34	51	21	60	39	31	0	56	201	396	20.10	39.60
Taranaki	30	22	55	28	20	25	30	14	50	49	30	19	34	39	54	31	35	32	338	259	33.80	25.90
Tasman	24	19	14	45	25	20	27	30	33	23	36	29	15	10	49	31	83	27	306	234	30.60	23.40
Waikato	19	24	26	15	19	10	35	32	20	20	26	35	50	77	46	22	28	24	269	259	26.90	25.90
Wellington	36	26	21	44	21	17	28	27	24	10	29	21	60	21	59	104	24	28	302	298	30.20	29.80

Source: Mitre 10 Cup Fixtures and Results 2016

=== Tries by week ===
Team	1		2		3		4		5		6		7		8		9		Total		Average	
Auckland	0	6	5	2	6	1	6	7	2	4	6	6	7	2	4	4	4	5	40	37	4.00	3.70
Bay of Plenty	3	3	5	5	4	4	8	3	1	4	8	8	5	6	5	5	4	3	43	41	4.30	4.10
Canterbury	6	0	5	1	8	4	8	1	1	1	7	4	7	7	6	2	2	5	50	25	5.00	2.50
Counties Manukau	2	2	5	5	5	2	3	3	8	5	5	4	1	0	1	2	5	2	35	25	3.50	2.50
Hawe's Bay	4	5	4	7	2	5	3	10	6	2	4	5	2	3	3	6	3	4	31	47	3.10	4.70
Manwatu	4	4	4	4	1	1	3	3	1	1	1	4	3	2	13	9	2	3	32	31	3.20	3.10
North Harbour	2	2	2	4	2	0	3	3	1	2	4	1	6	5	2	6	9	7	31	30	3.10	3.00
Northland	4	4	2	5	7	12	3	8	2	3	3	4	5	4	5	5	4	6	35	51	3.50	5.10
Otago	5	1	5	3	8	7	3	3	2	1	4	7	2	7	2	1	3	2	34	32	3.40	3.20
Southland	1	5	4	4	1	6	1	3	2	6	3	6	3	9	5	5	0	8	20	52	2.00	5.20
Taranaki	3	3	7	4	2	1	3	1	6	7	4	1	4	5	7	4	5	4	41	30	4.10	3.00
Tasman	2	1	1	5	1	2	3	3	3	2	5	4	0	1	4	4	11	3	30	25	3.00	2.50
Waikato	1	2	4	2	1	1	5	4	3	3	4	5	7	7	6	3	4	4	35	31	3.50	3.10
Wellington	5	4	3	5	0	2	3	3	4	1	4	3	9	3	8	15	4	4	40	40	4.00	4.00

For	Against

Source: The weekly reviews of the matches published on provincial.rugby (see "Report" in the individual match scoring stats).

=== Sanctions ===
Player	Team	Red	Yellow	Sent off match(es)
Sam Vaka	Counties Manukau	0	1	vs North Harbour
Hamish Northcott	Manawatu	0	1	vs Northland
Melani Nanai	Auckland	0	1	vs Canterbury
Monty Ioane	Bay of Plenty	0	1	vs Counties Manukau
Kieran Moffat	Southland	0	1	vs Auckland
Lima Sopoaga	Southland	0	1	vs Auckland
Lee Roy Atalifo	Canterbury	0	1	vs Northland
Shane Neville	Northland	0	1	vs Bay of Plenty
Tom Robinson	Northland	0	1	vs Bay of Plenty
Isaia Walker-Leawere	Wellington	0	1	vs Counties Manukau
Jonathan Ruru	Otago	0	1	vs Tasman
Jonah Lowe	Hawke's Bay	0	1	vs Canterbury
Loni Uhila	Waikato	0	1	vs Auckland
Mikaele Mafi	Southland	0	1	vs Hawke's Bay
Ihaia West	Hawke's Bay	0	1	vs Southland
Howard Sililoto	Northland	0	1	vs Tasman
Luke Whitelock	Canterbury	0	1	vs Manawatu
Tawera Kerr-Barlow	Waikato	0	1	vs Taranaki
Solomona Sakalia	Bay of Plenty	0	1	vs Southland
Kara Pryor	Northland	0	1	vs Wellington
Ash Dixon	Hawke's Bay	0	1	vs Tasman
Jimmy Cowan	Southland	0	1	vs North Harbour
Augustine Pulu	Counties Manukau	0	1	vs Tasman
Mitchell Brown	Taranaki	0	1	vs Canterbury
Sam Lousi	Wellington	0	1	vs Manawatu
Tevita Taufuʻi	Waikato	0	1	vs Hawke's Bay
Jared Proffit	Taranaki	0	1	vs Wellington
Culum Retallick	Bay of Plenty	0	1	vs Manawatu
Ethan Blackadder	Tasman	0	1	vs North Harbour
Kieron Fonotia	Tasman	0	1	vs North Harbour
Kylem O'Donnell	Taranaki	0	1	vs Auckland
Scott Scrafton	Auckland	0	1	vs Taranaki
Joshua Dickson	Otago	0	1	vs Manawatu
Sione Fifita	Counties Manukau	0	1	vs Canterbury
Ben Funnell	Canterbury	0	1	vs Counties Manukau
Henry Stowers	Bay of Plenty	0	1	vs Hawke's Bay
Tomasi Palu	Wellington	0	1	vs Waikato
Daniel Hawkins	Northland	0	1	vs North Harbour
Afa Fa'atau	North Harbour	0	1	vs Northland
Tom Franklin	Otago	0	1	vs Bay of Plenty
Glenn Preston	North Harbour	0	1	vs Otago
Nathan Earle	Canterbury	0	1	vs Tasman
Alex Ainley	Tasman	0	1	vs Canterbury

== Ranfurly Shield ==
=== Pre-season challenges ===
After winning the Ranfurly Shield off Hawke's Bay in their final game of 2015, Waikato confirmed their pre-season defences against Thames Valley, King Country and Wanganui. The Thames Valley and King Country unions would take on Waikato for the fifth time, while Wanganui gained a mandatory shield challenge as the current holders of the Meads Cup. The first challenge for 2016 was against Thames Valley at the Paeroa Domain. King Country's challenge was played at Bedford Park in Matamata with Wanganui being the last pre-season challenge.

Waikato had little trouble getting a victory in their first shield defense of the season, winning 83–13 in Paeroa. They ran in thirteen tries in front of a 2,500 capacity crowd. Winger Iliesa Ratuva scored a hat-trick on debut for his province, while number 8 Whetu Douglas and prop Atunaisa Moli both got a brace. Thames Valley managed two second-half tries, the first after Waikato had reached fifty points to veteran Brett Ranga. Their second came when centre Jone Koroinsagana scored an intercept. The match also featured a return for former Ireland half-back Isaac Boss, who first played for the province in 1999 before heading to Ulster in 2005.

In their second defense, Waikato got past King Country 55–0 in Matamata. First scoring was lock Brian Alainu'uese, getting over after a series of pick and goes. Jordan Trainor then soon after added a penalty. Flanker Murray Iti scored his side's fifth, but there was no further scoring action until the 74th minute, when Sevu Reece, on as a substitute, crossed over in the far left corner. Matthew Lansdown, another substitute, then added Waikato's seventh with two minutes to play, and he was followed in the final minute by Tevita Taufuʻi, who got their eighth.

6 June 2016
14:35 NZST

Waikato	83–13	Thames Valley
Try: Talakai 5' m Ratuva (3) 17' c, 33' m, 70' c Moli (2) 22' m, 72' m Douglas (2) 26' c, 68' c Ale 29' c Robertson 35' c Reece 41' c Faiva 56' c Iti 78' c Con: Robertson (6/9) 18', 28', 30', 36', 42', 57'; Lansdown (3/4) 69', 71', 79'; Pen: Robertson (0/1)	Preview; Report	Try: Ranga 44' m Koroinsagana 61' m Con: O'Flaherty (0/2); Pen: O'Flaherty (1/1) 12'

Paeroa Domain, Paeroa
Attendance: 2,500
Referee: Brett Johnson

30 June 2016
14:35 NZST

Waikato	55–0	King Country
Try: Alainu'uese 12' c Faiva (2) 32' m, 40' c Trainor 33' c Iti 47' c Reece 74' m Lansdown 77' c Taufuʻi 80' c Con: Trainor (6/8) 13', 34', 40', 48', 78', 80'; Pen: Trainor (1/1) 21'	Preview; Report

Bedford Park, Matamata
Attendance: 3,000
Referee: Angus Mabey

6 August 2016
14:35 NZST

Waikato	32–12	Wanganui
Try: Ratuva 2' m Taufuʻi 22' m Trainor (2) 49' m, 68' m Douglas 55' c Misa 80' m Con: Trainor (1/6) 56'	Preview; Report	Try: Thornbury 69' c Hughes 75' m Con: Whale (1/2) 70'

Memorial Park, Cambridge
Attendance: 3,000
Referee: Michael Lash

== See also ==
- 2016 Heartland Championship
