= Matt Vaega =

NZ rugby union player

- Born: 7 September 1994 (age 32) Auckland, New Zealand
- Height: 1.78 m (5 ft 10 in)
- Weight: 89 kg (14 st 0 lb; 196 lb)
- School: Kelston Boys' High School
- Notable relative(s): To’o Vaega (father); Cardiff Vaega (brother)

Rugby union career
- Position(s): Centre, Wing, Fullback, Fly-half
- Current team: Mitsubishi Dynaboars
Senior career
Years	Team	Apps	(Points)
2014–2017	North Harbour	38	(67)
2015–2017	Blues	2	(0)
2018–	Mitsubishi Dynaboars	84	(286)
- Correct as of 21 October 2022
International career
Years	Team	Apps	(Points)
2012	New Zealand Schools		

Matt Vaega (born 7 September 1994) is a New Zealand rugby union player who currently plays as a midfield back for North Harbour in the Mitre 10 Cup.

== Early career ==
The son of Samoan legend To'o Vaega, he was born and raised in Auckland, New Zealand and attended school at Kelston Boys' High School. While there, he helped them to lift the World Rugby Youth Tournament in Japan.

== Senior career ==
Vaega began his senior career with Auckland-based, North Harbour in 2014 scoring 2 tries in 6 appearances. Although the season was not successful for Harbour, Vaega impressed in their midfield and was retained for the following season. He played 9 times in 2015 and was then an ever present during Harbour's Championship winning season in 2016, scoring 4 tries in the process.

== Super Rugby ==
Impressive form at provincial level was rewarded when after only 6 senior appearances, he was surprisingly included in the Blues wider training group for the 2015 Super Rugby season. He debuted against the Crusaders and made a total of 3 appearances during the campaign including 1 start and also scored his first try at Super Rugby level.

New head coach Tana Umaga dropped him from the squad for 2016 Super Rugby season, however a mid-season injury crisis in the Blues midfield saw him called upon as an injury replacement and he made 2 appearances from the replacements bench.

Outstanding performances in North Harbour's successful Mitre 10 Cup campaign in 2016 saw him earn a recall to the Blues squad for 2017.

== International ==
Vaega represented New Zealand Schools in 2012.

== Career Honours ==
North Harbour

- Mitre 10 Cup Championship - 2016

== Super Rugby Statistics ==
As of 30 November 2016

Season	Team	Games	Starts	Sub	Mins	Tries	Cons	Pens	Drops	Points	Yel	Red
2015	Blues	3	1	2	116	1	0	0	0	5	0	0
2016	Blues	2	0	2	42	0	0	0	0	0	0	0
Total		5	1	4	158	1	0	0	0	5	0	0
