= Travis Taylor =

Travis Taylor may refer to:

- Travis Taylor (American football) (born 1978), American football player
- Travis S. Taylor, American science fiction author, scientist, and host of Rocket City Rednecks television show
- Travis Taylor (basketball), American basketball player
- Travis Taylor (rugby union) (born 1995), New Zealand rugby union player

== See also ==
- Travis & Taylor: the marriage of Taylor Swift and Travis Kelce
- Search for "Travis" and "Taylor" on Wikipedia
- All pages with titles containing "Travis" and "Taylor"
- Travis (disambiguation)
- Taylor (disambiguation)
