= Sakalia =

Sakalia is a surname. Notable people with the surname include:

- Solomona Sakalia (born 1991), New Zealand rugby union player
- Sosefo Sakalia (born 1991), Tongan rugby union player
