= Rob Thompson (rugby union) =

NZ rugby union player (born 1991)

- Born: 29 August 1991 (age 35) Woodville, New Zealand
- Height: 1.84 m (6 ft 0 in)
- Weight: 103 kg (16 st 3 lb; 227 lb)
- School: Palmerston North Boys' High School
- Notable relative: Isaac Thompson (brother)

Rugby union career
- Position: Centre / Wing
- Current team: Toshiba Brave Lupus
Senior career
Years	Team	Apps	(Points)
2013–2017	Canterbury	48	(95)
2014	Crusaders	2	(0)
2016–2020	Highlanders	56	(65)
2018–2019	Manawatu	13	(15)
2021–2023	Toyota Verblitz	29	(55)
2023–	Toshiba Brave Lupus	41	(85)
- Correct as of 10 May 2025
International career
Years	Team	Apps	(Points)
2016	Māori All Blacks	6	(0)
- Correct as of 30 October 2016

Rob Thompson (born 29 August 1991) is a New Zealand rugby union player who currently plays centre for Manawatu in New Zealand's domestic Mitre 10 Cup and the Highlanders in the international Super Rugby competition. As of 2025, he was playing for Toshiba Brave Lupus in Japan Rugby Leagueone.

== Early career ==
Originally hailing from Manawatu, Thompson started out his rugby career playing club rugby in his home province for University while working as a storeman. After failing to be picked in the Manawatu Turbos ITM Cup squad in 2012, he headed south to try out for Canterbury's Colts side. His development continued in 2013 when he was selected for the Crusaders Knights squad during the first half of the year and the Canterbury ITM Cup team in the latter part.

== Senior career ==
Although Thompson wasn't initially named in the Canterbury squad for the 2013 ITM Cup, injuries and All Blacks call-ups meant that Thompson was promoted from the wider training group and went on to become a key player as the red and blacks were crowned ITM Cup Premiership champions. He made 10 appearances and scored 4 tries in his first year of provincial rugby and was subsequently promoted to Canterbury's full squad for 2014. The Cantabrians failed to defend their Premiership crown in 2014 but Thompson did feature in all 11 of their games during a season which culminated with elimination at the hands of local rivals, Tasman at the semi-final stage.

Both he and Canterbury were back on song in 2015 with Canterbury reclaiming their ITM Cup Premiership Title with a 25–23 victory over Auckland in the final and Thompson finishing as the tournament's joint leading try scorer along with George Moala of Auckland. His try haul of 10 included a hat-trick in Round 4, a 57–7 win over his home province, Manawatu. Canterbury made it back to back provincial titles in 2016 and 8 titles in 9 years with an MCL strain restricting Thompson to just 6 appearances in which he managed an impressive haul of 4 tries including one in the final, a 43–27 win over Tasman.

== Super Rugby ==
Thompson's form during the 2013 ITM Cup brought him to the attention of Christchurch-based Super Rugby franchise, the Crusaders who named him as a member of their wider training group for the 2014 Super Rugby season during which he made a total of 2 appearances. However, the following year he found himself without a Super Rugby contract and had to rebuild his career in club rugby.

In October 2015, after a successful season with Canterbury in which he was the ITM Cup's joint leading try scorer; he revealed that he had signed a two-year contract with the Dunedin-based Highlanders for the 2016 Super Rugby season. He found opportunities easier to come by in Dunedin than he had in Christchurch and played 9 times for the tournament defending champions as they made the semi-finals before losing out 42–30 to the Lions in Johannesburg. He was retained in the squad for the 2017 season.

== International ==
On 27 October 2016, Thompson was called up to the Māori All Blacks squad as an injury replacement for Declan O'Donnell ahead of the 2016 end-of-year rugby union internationals, however a hamstring injury picked up during the Mitre 10 Cup final meant that he also had to withdraw and saw his place taken by Ambrose Curtis on 30 October.

== Career Honours ==
Canterbury

- National Provincial Championship - 2013, 2015, 2016

== Super Rugby Statistics ==
As of 3 January 2017

Season	Team	Games	Starts	Sub	Mins	Tries	Cons	Pens	Drops	Points	Yel	Red
2014	Crusaders	2	1	1	85	0	0	0	0	0	0	0
2016	Highlanders	9	8	1	577	2	0	0	0	10	0	0
Total		11	9	2	662	2	0	0	0	10	0	0
