= Brad Weber =

New Zealand rugby union player

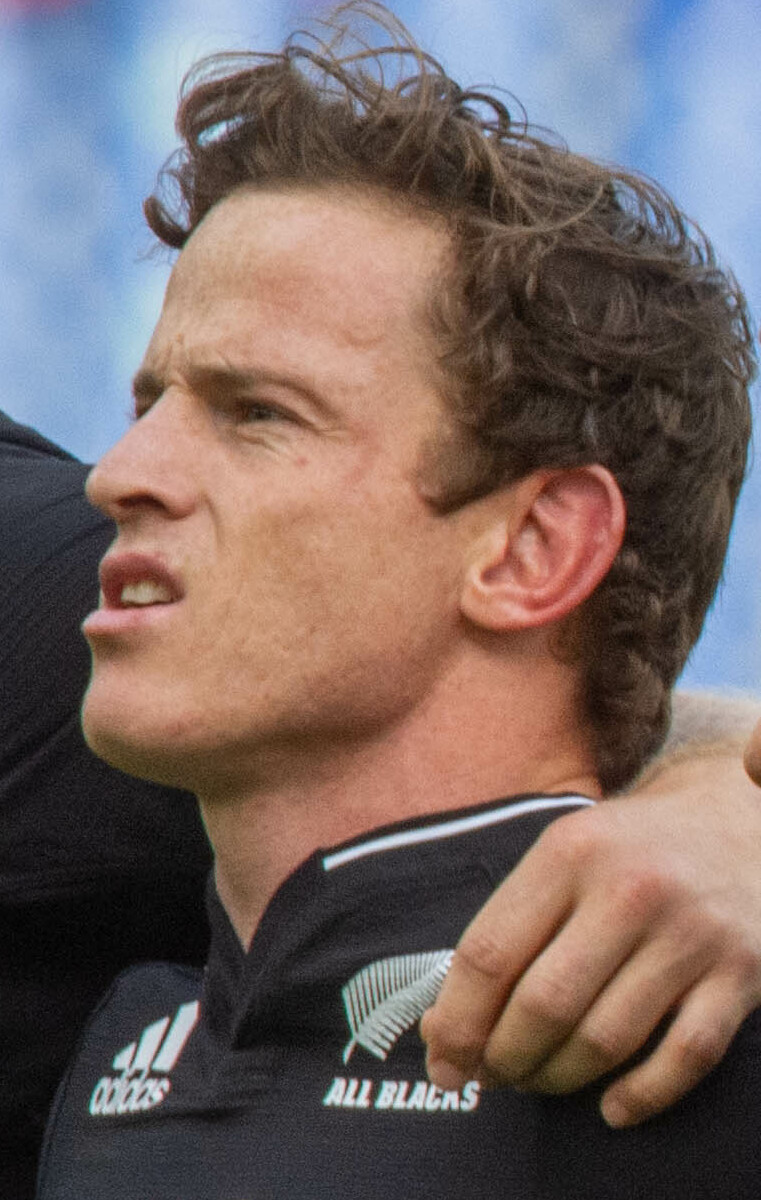
- Weber in 2021
- Full name: Brad McCormick Weber
- Born: 17 January 1991 (age 35) Napier, New Zealand
- Height: 172 cm (5 ft 8 in)
- Weight: 75 kg (165 lb; 11 st 11 lb)
- School: Napier Boys' High School

Rugby union career
- Position: Half-back
- Current team: Mitsubishi Sagamihara DynaBoars
Senior career
Years	Team	Apps	(Points)
2012	Otago	9	(0)
2013–2015	Waikato	26	(62)
2014–2023	Chiefs	123	(139)
2016–2023	Hawke's Bay	50	(127)
2023–2025	Stade Français	35	(15)
2025–	Mitsubishi Sagamihara DynaBoars	14	(15)
- Correct as of 9 June 2026
International career
Years	Team	Apps	(Points)
2011	New Zealand U20	5	(10)
2015–2022	New Zealand	18	(30)
2015–2022	Māori All Blacks	9	(15)
2020	South Island	1	(0)
2022–2023	All Blacks XV	3	(0)
- Correct as of 16 May 2024

Brad McCormick Weber (born 17 January 1991) is a New Zealand rugby union player, who currently plays as a halfback for Mitsubishi Sagamihara DynaBoars in the Japan Rugby League One. He previously played for Hawke's Bay in the National Provincial Championship, the Chiefs in Super Rugby and for Stade Français in the French Top 14. He has represented New Zealand internationally.

== Early life ==
Brother of Napier Marist rugby player Sam Weber and son of Neil Weber. Brad attended St Patrick's school in Napier before moving to Napier Boys’ High School for his secondary school education. Brad played his junior rugby for Napier Old Boys’ Marist and was selected into the Napier Ross Shield team in 2003.

== Career ==
After moving to Dunedin he joined the Dunedin Rugby Football Club (Inc) 'The Sharks' Established in 1871 playing firstly for the Premier Colts side in 2010 and then the Senior Premier side in 2011. He was in the Hawkes Bay ITM side in that year. He played for Dunedin in 2012 and was in the Senior Premier side that were runners up for the Premier Banner. In 2013 the Dunedin Premier side won the Premier 1 Dunedin Metropolitan Club Championship and the club named him Speight's Premier Player of the year. Weber has still referenced his playing days with the 'Sharks' with a 'Fins Up' salute after he has scored for his current team.

Weber started his senior career playing for the Otago Razorbacks while studying for an applied science degree at the University of Otago. He made nine appearances during the 2012 ITM Cup, but could not dislodge Fumiaki Tanaka as first choice half-back.

2013 did not start well for him as rising-star Josh Renton was named ahead of him in the Dunedin team's ITM Cup squad and he began to focus more on his studies than rugby. However, a month into the season he received a call from Waikato coach Johnny Walters who wanted to take him north to provide more competition for halfbacks Mick Snowden and Kylem O'Donnell. His switch was more successful than he could have imagined as a series of good performances saw him named in the Chiefs wider training group ahead of the 2014 Super Rugby season. Tawera Kerr-Barlow and Augustine Pulu were selected as the defending champions first-choice halfbacks; however, an injury to Kerr-Barlow prior to the season opener against the Crusaders opened the door for Weber, who made his Super Rugby debut as a second-half substitute in an 18–10 win for the Chiefs.

Weber was named captain of the Waikato ITM Cup squad for the 2014 ITM Cup season and co-captain with Whetu Douglas for the 2015 ITM Cup season.

At the end of the 2015 ITM Cup season, after scoring a second half hat trick in the final match against Hawke's Bay to win the Ranfurly Shield for Waikato, it was announced that Weber had signed a contract to return to Napier to play for Hawke's Bay during the 2016 ITM Cup season.

On 19 May 2023, after ten years at the franchise, the Chiefs announced that Weber would be leaving for France after the 2023 season. French Top 14 club Stade Français confirmed on 7 June 2023 that it had signed Weber ahead of the 2023–24 Top 14 season.

Weber made his debut for Stade Français – from the bench – on 18 November 2023 against Racing 92. He scored his first two tries for the club on 14 September 2024 against Vannes.

Weber had signed for three seasons with Stade Français, but his second season with the club was cut short due to a serious ankle injury that required surgery. Having not played at all during the first half of the 2025–26 season, Weber reached an agreement with Stade Français that allowed him to leave the club early, in December 2025, to take up an opportunity in Japan.

On 18 December 2025, Japan Rugby League One club Mitsubishi Sagamihara DynaBoars announced that Weber would join the club. He played his first game for the side on 10 January 2026 in the round 4 game against Toshiba Brave Lupus.

== International career ==
Weber was a member of the New Zealand Under 20 side that won the 2011 IRB Junior World Championship in Italy. He largely served as back up to TJ Perenara during the competition.

Weber made his All Blacks debut against Samoa on 8 July 2015. On 2 October 2019, during the 2019 Rugby World Cup in Japan, Weber scored his first international try in a pool match against Canada. He scored a second in the same match.

On 1 November 2025, Weber played for the Barbarians against the All Blacks XV.

== Personal life ==
Weber is a New Zealander of Ngāti Porou descent and stated in an interview that he wants to be an inspiration to those who are of Māori descent, but who feel they do not look Māori, to seek out their origins (Whakapapa).

== Honours ==
New Zealand

- Rugby World Cup / Webb Ellis Cup
  - Third-place: 2019
