= Jack Stratton =

Jack Stratton may refer to:

- Jack Stratton (musician) (born 1987), American multi-instrumentalist
- Jack Stratton (rugby union) (born 1994), New Zealand rugby union player
