= Tevita Taufuʻi =

Tonga international rugby union player

- Born: 21 March 1988 (age 38)
- Height: 1.82 m (6 ft 0 in)
- Weight: 88 kg (13 st 12 lb; 194 lb)

Rugby union career
- Position: Centre
- Current team: Waikato
Senior career
Years	Team	Apps	(Points)
2009–13	Manawatu	16	(20)
2016	Waikato	11	(10)
- Correct as of 19 November 2016
International career
Years	Team	Apps	(Points)
2016–	Tonga	2	(0)
- Correct as of 10 July 2017

Tevita Taufuʻi (born 21 March 1988) is a Tongan rugby union player who played as a centre for Waikato and Manawatu in New Zealand's national provincial competitions and for the Tonga national rugby union team.

== Senior career ==
After debuting for the Manawatu Turbos during the 2009 Air New Zealand Cup, the next 5 years of his career were ones of ups and downs. Making the ITM Cup squad in 3 of his 5 seasons in Manawatu, playing 16 times and scoring 3 tries. Stifled by a lack of opportunities, he headed to Waikato and played club rugby with the Melville Club.

2016 was his breakthrough year; after helping Melville to win a first Breweries Shield in 35 years in July, he was named in Waikato's 2016 Mitre 10 Cup squad. He debuted for the Mooloo in their Ranfurly Shield defence against Thames Valley on 6 June 2016 and made 11 Ranfurly Shield and Mitre 10 Cup appearances during the season, scoring 2 tries in the process.

== International ==
Taufuʻi earned a call up to the Tonga squad ahead of the 2016 end-of-year rugby union internationals and earned his first cap as a second-half replacement in a 28–13 win over Spain on 12 November 2016.
