= Lee-Roy Atalifo =

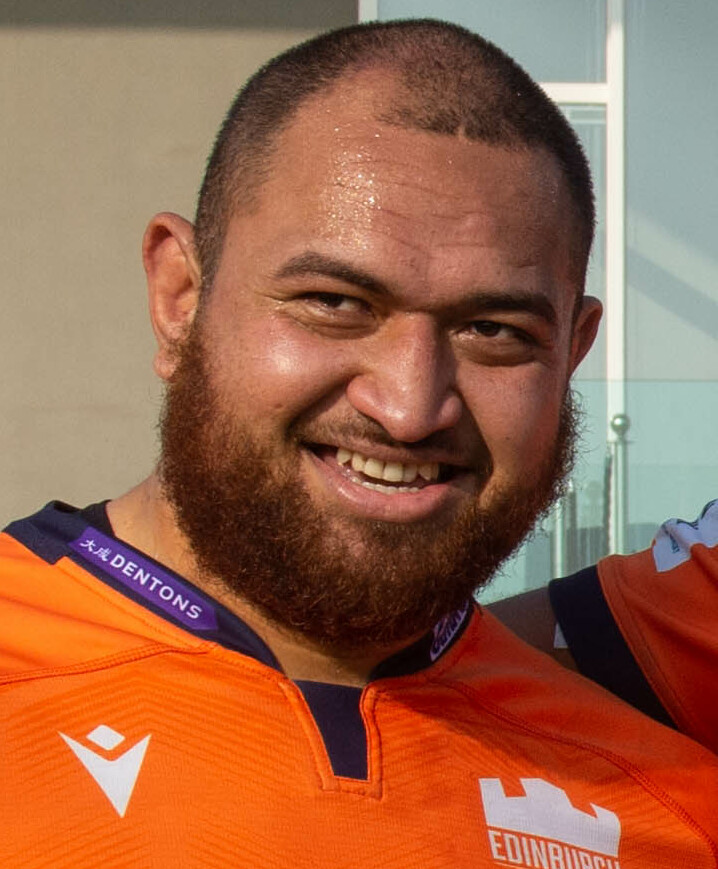
- Full name: Lee-Roy Eliki Atalifo
- Born: 10 March 1988 (age 38) Rotuma, Fiji
- Height: 180 cm (5 ft 11 in)
- Weight: 134 kg (295 lb; 21 st 1 lb)
- School: Lelean Memorial School

Rugby union career
- Position: Prop
- Current team: Edinburgh Rugby
Senior career
Years	Team	Apps	(Points)
2015–2016	Rovigo Delta	12	(5)
2016	Canterbury	4	(0)
2017–2020	Jersey Reds	57	(5)
2020–2023	Edinburgh Rugby	33	(10)
- Correct as of 26 April 2023
International career
Years	Team	Apps	(Points)
2015–	Fiji	13	(0)
2015	Fiji Warriors	4	(0)
- Correct as of 6 April 2023

Lee Roy Atalifo (born 10 March 1988) is a Fijian rugby union player who last played for Edinburgh Rugby in the United Rugby Championship.

== Career ==
He was part of the Fijian squad at the 2015 Rugby World Cup. Atalifo works as a firefighter for the National Fire Authority in Fiji. In 2015 he joined Italian club Rugby Rovigo Delta. He was named in Canterbury's squad for the 2016 Mitre 10 Cup.

On 27 April 2017, Atalifo signed for English club Jersey Reds in the RFU Championship from the 2017-18 season.

On 11 March 2020, Atalifo signed for Edinburgh Rugby in the United Rugby Championship from the 2020–21 season.
