= Nathan Vella =

- Born: 10 February 1990 (age 36) Henderson, New Zealand
- Height: 1.83 m (6 ft 0 in)
- Weight: 108 kg (17 st 0 lb; 238 lb)
- School: Auckland Grammar School

Rugby union career
- Position: Hooker
- Current team: Bay of Plenty
Amateur team(s)
Years	Team	Apps	(Points)
- 2018
Senior career
Years	Team	Apps	(Points)
2011–13	Auckland	15	(5)
2013–15	London Welsh	32	(25)
2015–16	Bedford Blues	2	(5)
2016–2018	Canterbury	33	(30)
2018	Hurricanes	3	(0)
2019	Sunwolves	12	(5)
2020	Highlanders	0	
2021	Crusaders	5	
2019	Bay of Plenty	35	(30)
2018	CocaCola	17	(15)
- Correct as of 23 November 2016
- Correct as of Hurricanes

Nathan Vella (born 10 February 1990) is a New Zealand rugby union player who currently plays as a hooker for Canterbury in New Zealand's domestic Mitre 10 Cup.

== Youth career ==
Born and raised in Auckland, Vella attended Auckland Grammar School in the city and played first XV rugby with them for 3 years, captaining the side in 2008. During this time, he made his way through the age group levels with his local provincial side, Auckland.

== Senior career ==
Vella started his senior career with his local side, Auckland, making 14 appearances for them across 3 seasons from 2011 to 2013. He then moved to the UK to try his luck, initially with London Welsh who he helped win promotion to the English Premiership in 2014. Latterly he had a short stint with RFU Championship side, the Bedford Blues before returning to New Zealand in 2016.

After a short spell providing injury cover for Super Rugby franchise, the Crusaders at the beginning of 2016, he was named in their main feeder union, Canterbury's squad for the 2016 Mitre 10 Cup. He made 9 appearances, 7 of which were as a replacement for regular starter Ben Funnell and scored an impressive 4 tries which helped Canterbury lift that year's Mitre 10 Cup Premiership, their 8th success in 9 seasons.

== Super Rugby ==
Vella made his super rugby debit for the Crusaders as in 2016 and in 2018 played for the Hurricanes against the Crusaders. Then in 2019 Vella played for Japanese super side the Sunwolves. When third choice Highlanders hooker Ricky Jackson suffered an ankle injury before the 2020 season, Vella was bought into the side.
