= Johnny Fa'auli =

New Zealand rugby union player

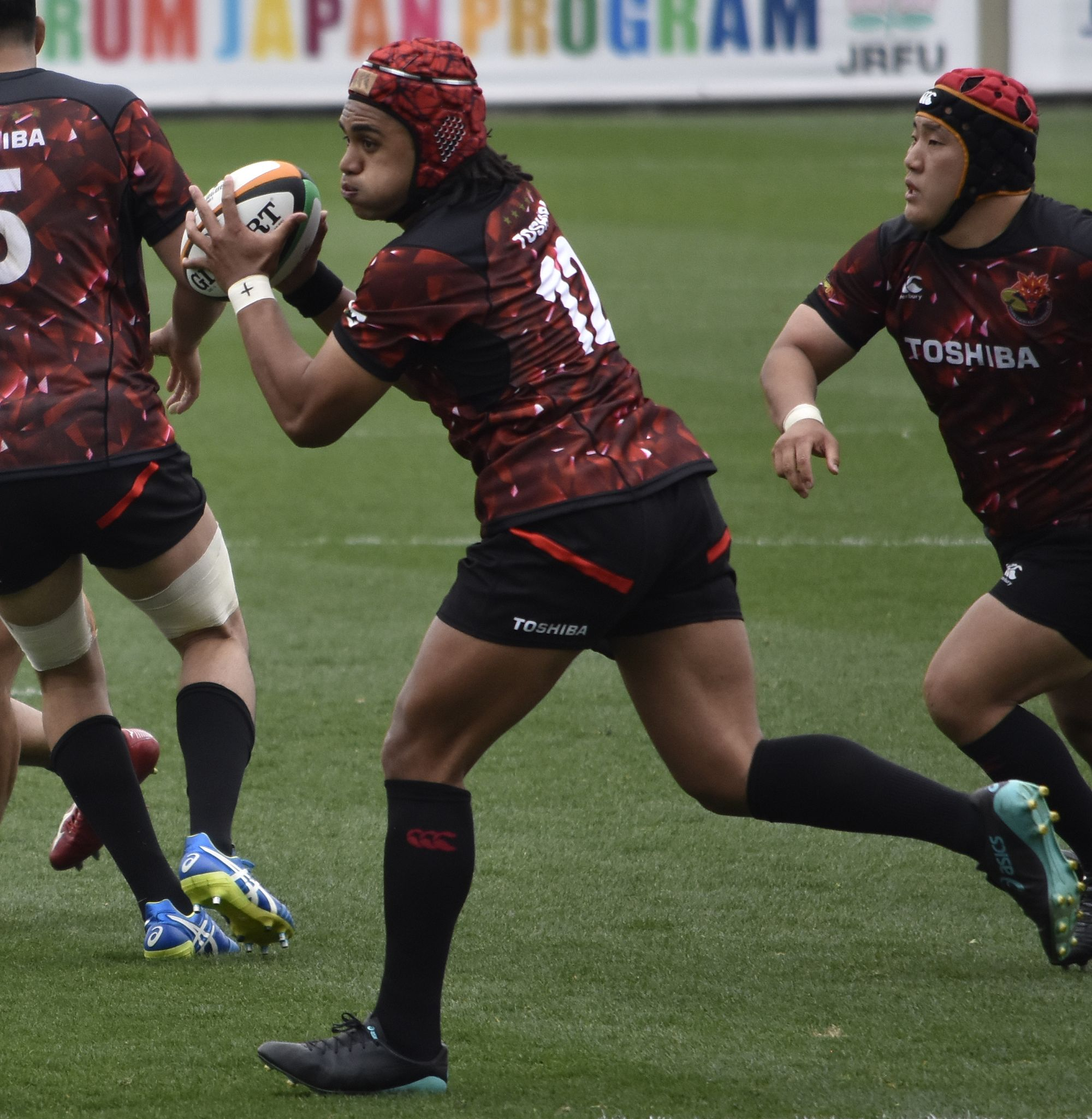
- Full name: Fa'ase'e Johnathan Fa'auli
- Born: 13 September 1995 (age 31) Ōtāhuhu, New Zealand
- Height: 1.78 m (5 ft 10 in)
- Weight: 103 kg (16 st 3 lb; 227 lb)
- School: De La Salle College Saint Kentigern College

Rugby union career
- Position: Centre
- Current team: JR East Green Warriors
Senior career
Years	Team	Apps	(Points)
2015	Counties Manukau	9	(0)
2016–2017	Taranaki	16	(15)
2017–2018	Chiefs	16	(15)
2018–2022	Toshiba Brave Lupus	27	(10)
2022–2024	Shizuoka Blue Revs	9	(7)
2024–2026	Honda Heat	15	(15)
2026–	JR East Green Warriors		
- Correct as of 21 February 2021
International career
Years	Team	Apps	(Points)
2013	New Zealand Schools		
2015	New Zealand U20	1	(0)
- Correct as of 3 November 2016
National sevens team
Years	Team		Comps
2021-	Japan		3

Johnny Fa'auli (born 13 September 1995) is a New Zealand rugby union player for the Chiefs in the international Super Rugby competition and for Toshiba Brave Lupus in the Japanese Top League.

== Youth career ==
Fa'auli was born in the Auckland suburb of Ōtāhuhu and attended school at De La Salle College prior to moving to Saint Kentigern College for a rugby scholarship.

== Senior career ==
He took his first steps in his senior career with his local provincial side, the Counties Manukau Steelers, for whom he made 10 appearances in 2015 before moving south to join the Taranaki Bulls in 2016. 3 tries in 10 appearances in a season which saw the Bulls reach the Premiership semi-finals before going down to Tasman represented a good first season for Taranaki.

== Super Rugby ==
Consistent performances over the course of 2 provincial seasons saw him earn his first Super Rugby ahead of the 2017 Super Rugby season when he was signed up by the Hamilton-based franchise, the Chiefs.

== International ==
Fa'auli was a New Zealand Schools representative in 2013.
