= Wes Goosen =

South African-born New Zealand rugby union player

- Full name: Wesley Goosen
- Born: 20 October 1995 (age 31) East London, South Africa
- Height: 179 cm (5 ft 10 in)
- Weight: 92 kg (203 lb; 14 st 7 lb)
- School: Wellington College

Rugby union career
- Position(s): Wing, Centre, Fullback
- Current team: Edinburgh
Senior career
Years	Team	Apps	(Points)
2014–2021	Wellington	65	(130)
2016–2022	Hurricanes	68	(150)
2022–	Edinburgh Rugby	32	(30)
- Correct as of 14 October 2024
International career
Years	Team	Apps	(Points)
2015	New Zealand U20	1	(5)
- Correct as of 5 June 2022

Wesley Goosen (born 20 October 1995) is a South African-born New Zealand rugby union player who currently plays for Edinburgh Rugby in the United Rugby Championship.

== Early career ==
Born in the South African city of East London, Goosen moved to New Zealand along with his family at the age of 4, initially settling in Auckland, where he attended primary school, before moving south to the nation's capital, Wellington where he attended high school at Wellington College. After graduating from high school, he went on to play club rugby for Old Boys University while also being a member of Wellington's Under-19 side which won the national title in 2014.

== Senior career ==
Goosen first played provincial rugby for Wellington in the 2014 ITM Cup, making his only appearance in a 25-37 loss at home to Waikato in round 1. In the 2015 ITM Cup, Goosen was a more regular player, scoring 2 tries in 9 matches. Goosen also played in the 2016 Mitre 10 Cup, scoring 4 tries in 11 games.

== Super Rugby ==
Goosen was not named in the Hurricanes squad for the 2016 Super Rugby season; however following an incident in which 5 players breached the franchise's protocols and were subsequently stood down, he made his Super Rugby debut in the number 11 jersey against the Reds. The 20-year old scored with his first touch of the ball in the 14th minute, to help his side record a 29-14 win. He made one further substitute appearance that year.

Hurricanes head coach Chris Boyd promoted Goosen to the senior squad for the franchise's title defense in 2017.

== International ==
Goosen was a New Zealand Schools representative in 2013, and scored a try in their 17-16 victory over Australia. He was also a member of the New Zealand Under-20 side which competed in the Oceania Championship in Australia in May 2015; however he didn't make the final squad for the 2015 World Rugby Under 20 Championship in Italy.

== Career Honours ==
Hurricanes

- Super Rugby - 2016

== Super Rugby Statistics ==
As of 24 January 2017

Season	Team	Games	Starts	Sub	Mins	Tries	Cons	Pens	Drops	Points	Yel	Red
2016	Hurricanes	2	1	1	98	1	0	0	0	5	0	0
Total		2	1	1	98	1	0	0	0	5	0	0
