= Trevis =

Trevis may refer to:

== People ==
=== Surname ===
- Bos Trevis (1911–1984), English footballer
- Derek Trevis (1942–2000), English footballer
- Di Trevis (born 1947), English theatre director and actress
- Floyd Trevis, American racing car constructor of the 1950s and 1960s

=== Given name ===
- Trevis Gipson (born 1997), American football linebacker
- Trevis Jackson (born 1995), Filipino-American basketball player
- Trevis Smith (born 1976), Canadian football linebacker
- Trevis Simpson (born 1991), American basketball player
- Trevis Turner (born 1987), American football offensive lineman

== Other uses ==
- Trevis., taxonomic author abbreviation of Vittore Benedetto Antonio Trevisan de Saint-Léon (1818–1897), Italian botanist
- A device used in shoeing oxen, see Livestock crush#History
- Treviso Bresciano (Brescian: Trevìs), comune in the province of Brescia, in Lombardy
- Daihatsu Trevis, export name of the Daihatsu Mira Gino in some markets in Europe

== See also ==
- Trevi (disambiguation)
- Travis (disambiguation)
