= Travis =

Travis may refer to:

== People and fictional characters ==
- Travis (given name), a list of people and fictional characters
- Travis (surname), a list of people

== Places in the United States ==
- Travis, Staten Island, a neighborhood
- Travis Air Force Base, a United States Air Force base in California
- Travis, Texas, an unincorporated community
- Travis County, Texas
- Lake Travis, Texas, a reservoir on the Colorado River

== Schools ==
- William B. Travis High School (Austin, Texas)
- William B. Travis High School (Fort Bend County, Texas)
- Travis Elementary School (disambiguation), schools in Texas and California
- Lake Travis High School

== Other uses ==
- Travis (band), a Scottish band
- Travis (chimpanzee) (died 2009), a domesticated chimpanzee who attacked and mauled a Connecticut woman
- Travis CI, a hosted continuous integration service, for software development

== See also ==
- Trevis (disambiguation)
