= Jordan Trainor =

New Zealand rugby union player

- Full name: Jordan Vincent Trainor
- Born: 31 January 1996 (age 30) Auckland, New Zealand
- Height: 1.86 m (6 ft 1 in)
- Weight: 95 kg (14 st 13 lb; 209 lb)
- School: St Peter's College, Auckland
- University: University of Waikato

Rugby union career
- Position(s): Fullback, Wing
- Current team: Northland, Kurita Water Gush
Senior career
Years	Team	Apps	(Points)
2015–2016	Waikato	11	(82)
2017–2018	Blues	2	(0)
2017–2022	Auckland	41	(62)
2022	LA Giltinis	13	(15)
2023	New Orleans Gold	10	(16)
2023–	Northland	12	(20)
2026–	Kurita Water Gush		
- Correct as of 4 October 2024
International career
Years	Team	Apps	(Points)
2016	New Zealand U20	1	(0)
- Correct as of 4 October 2024

Jordan Trainor (born 31 January 1996) is a New Zealand rugby union player who currently plays for Northland in the Bunnings NPC. His position is Fullback. He previously played for the Blues in Super Rugby.

== Youth career ==
Born and bred in Auckland, Trainor attended St Peter's College in the city and went on to represent Auckland at under 18 level before heading south to Waikato to attend university.

== Senior career ==
Trainor was a winner of the Sir Edmund Hillary scholarship which saw him attend the University of Waikato. Whilst there he played local level rugby with the Fraser Tech Rugby club and also made 11 appearances in Ranfurly Shield and Mitre 10 Cup games for Waikato. It was announced at the end of the 2016 season that Trainor would return home to play for Auckland in 2017.

== Super Rugby ==
Trainor was named in the Blues wider training squad ahead of the 2016 Super Rugby season, however, injury meant that he didn't make any appearances during the campaign. His return to fitness and form with Waikato in the second half of 2016 ensured that he was named in the Blues full squad for the 2017.

== International ==
Trainor was chosen as a member of the New Zealand U20 side which competed in the 2016 World Rugby Under 20 Championship in England, however injury limited him to just one appearance.

== Honours ==
Utah Warriors

- All Major League Ruby first team (2025)
