= Trevi =

Trevi may refer to:

== Places in Italy ==
- Trevi (rione of Rome), one of the official rioni or districts of the modern city of Rome
  - Trevi Fountain, a fountain in that district
- Trevi, Umbria, a comune in Perugia province
- Trevi di Terni, a frazione of Terni, in Perugia province
- Trevi nel Lazio, a comune in Frosinone province

== Other uses ==
- TREVI, an internal security group formed by the European Council
- Lancia Trevi, an automobile
- Gloria Trevi, a Mexican singer-songwriter

== See also ==
- Trevis (disambiguation)
