= Michael Little =

NZ rugby union player

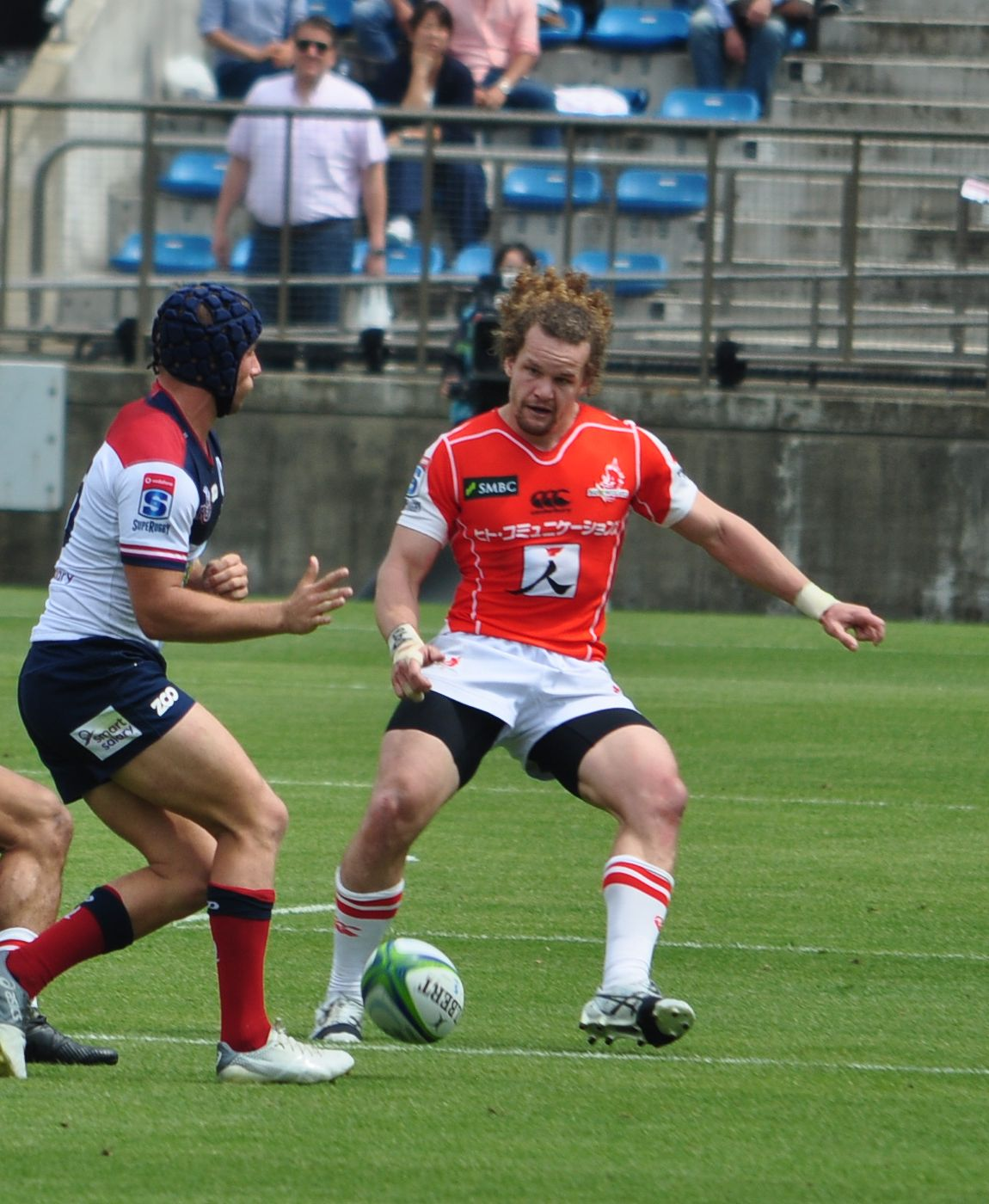
- Born: 14 March 1993 (age 33) Rome, Italy
- Height: 1.83 m (6 ft 0 in)
- Weight: 92 kg (14 st 7 lb; 203 lb)
- School: Westlake Boys High School
- Notable relative(s): Walter Little (father); Lawrence Little (uncle); Nicky Little (cousin)

Rugby union career
- Position: Fullback / Centre
- Current team: Kobelco Steelers
Senior career
Years	Team	Apps	(Points)
2013–2016	North Harbour	19	(55)
2017–2022	Mitsubishi Dynaboars	40	(105)
2018–2019	Sunwolves	18	(15)
2022–	Kobelco Steelers	50	(90)
- Correct as of 21 February 2021
International career
Years	Team	Apps	(Points)
2012	Fiji U20	2	(5)
- Correct as of 21 February 2021

Michael Little (born 14 March 1993) is a New Zealand rugby union player who currently plays either as a midfield back or fullback for the Sunwolves in Super Rugby. He was named as a member of the Blues wider training group ahead of the 2016 Super Rugby season. As the only try scorer for his team, Little was an important part of North Harbour winning the 2016 Mitre 10 Cup championship against Otago. Little was also nominated for the 2016 Mitre 10 Cup player of the year award.

Little was part of Fiji Under 20s and travelled to the 2012 IRB Junior World Championship .
