= Fletcher Smith (rugby union) =

- Born: 1 March 1995 (age 31) Nelson, New Zealand
- Height: 180 cm (5 ft 11 in)
- Weight: 88 kg (194 lb; 13 st 12 lb)
- School: Christchurch Boys' High School

Rugby union career
- Position(s): First five-eighth, Fullback
Senior career
Years	Team	Apps	(Points)
2015–2017	Otago	34	(287)
2016–2018	Highlanders	16	(34)
2018–2020	Waikato	40	(301)
2019–2020	Hurricanes	13	(29)
2021	NTT Shining Arcs	3	(26)
2022	Green Rockets Tokatsu	8	(76)
2022-2025	Lyon	25	(74)
2025–2026	AZ-COM Maruwa MOMOTARO’S	8	(81)
- Correct as of 12 September 2022
International career
Years	Team	Apps	(Points)
2015	New Zealand U20	2	(9)
2019	Māori All Blacks	2	(0)
- Correct as of 12 June 2020

Fletcher Smith (born 1 March 1995) is a New Zealand rugby union player who currently plays as a first five-eighth for Lyon in France’s league the Top 14. He has also represented the Highlanders. He is Māori of Ngāti Kahungunu descent.

== Early career ==
Raised in Nelson on New Zealand's South Island, Smith initially attended Nelson College in his hometown before finishing off his schooling at Christchurch Boys' High School, playing first XV rugby for them and wearing the same number 10 jersey that Dan Carter, Andrew Mehrtens and Aaron Mauger had worn before him. After graduating high school, he headed south to Dunedin to study commerce at the University of Otago and played local club rugby for the university's team during his time there.

== Senior career ==
Smith got his senior career under way in 2015, turning out 11 times for Otago in the ITM Cup Championship and helping them to a third-place finish. He then played all of the Razorbacks 12 games in 2016 and kicked 106 points as they topped the Championship log but were defeated 17-14 by North Harbour, consigning them to another season of Championship rugby in 2017.

== Super Rugby ==
Smith earned a short-term contract with the Highlanders towards the end of the 2016 season and made two substitute appearances in which he kicked one conversion. He was subsequently promoted to the franchise's full squad for the 2017 Super Rugby season.

== Super Rugby statistics ==
As of 16 August 2016

Season	Team	Games	Starts	Sub	Mins	Tries	Cons	Pens	Drops	Points	Yel	Red
2016	Highlanders	2	0	2	14	0	1	0	0	2	0	0
Total		2	0	2	14	0	1	0	0	2	0	0
