= Kylem O'Donnell =

NZ rugby union player

- Full name: Kylem Francis Te Riri O'Donnell
- Born: 1 August 1989 (age 37) Thames, New Zealand
- Height: 1.80 m (5 ft 11 in)
- Weight: 92 kg (14 st 7 lb; 203 lb)
- School: Hamilton Boys' High School
- University: Waikato institute of Technology
- Notable relative: Declan O'Donnell (brother)
- Occupation: professional rugby player

Rugby union career
- Position(s): Scrum-half, Wing
- Current team: Waikato
Youth career
- Hamilton Boys' High School 2006–2008 (47 caps)
Senior career
Years	Team	Apps	(Points)
2009–2012	Taranaki	8	(0)
2013	Waikato	8	(0)
2015–2017	Taranaki	25	(15)
2017	Hurricanes	0	(0)
2018–	Waikato	4	(5)
- Correct as of 6 November 2016
International career
Years	Team	Apps	(Points)
2011–13	All Blacks Sevens	5 tournaments	(17)
- Correct as of 6 November 2016

Kylem Francis Te Riri O'Donnell (born 1 August 1989) is a New Zealand rugby union player who currently plays as a halfback for Taranaki in New Zealand's domestic Mitre 10 Cup. He is also a former All Blacks Sevens representative.

== Early career ==
Raised in Waikato, O'Donnell attended Hamilton Boys' High School and played 47 games for the 1st XV along with younger brother Declan, who also went on to become a professional rugby player.

O'Donnell was an NZ under 20s trialist in 2008 and was named as a non-travelling reserve for the IRB Under 20 World cup 2009 in Japan, alongside Cody Rei, who later joined the full Squad.

Not being recognized by Waikato Academy until after making the NZ under 20s trials, O'Donnell decided to shift to Taranaki in 2009 after school, in pursuit of an ITM Cup contract.

After a good local season with the Clifton Rugby club, he was signed for the 2009 Taranaki ITM Cup Squad. He made his debut for the Bulls in a match against Counties Manukau in Pukekohe.

== Senior career ==
O'Donnell spent the 2009 and 2010 seasons with Taranaki and during that time his appearances were largely confined to cameos from the replacements bench.

He was also signed by the Taranki Bulls for the 2011 and 2012 season. O'Donnells Career was hindered in 2011, Plagued by a foot injury and coupled by a brawl with bouncers in an incident at A Hamilton Bar with his brother Declan, he made only 2 appearances off the bench in 2011.

An injury in preseason training leading into a ranfurly shield defense against whanganui also set O'Donnell back in 2012. Where he was then "leap-frogged" by Jamison Gibson-Park.

O'Donnell eventually returned to his home town Hamilton to play for Waikato, for whom he started the first 4 games at half back. He was replaced by Brad weber who was a late addition to the itm cup squad. O'Donnell played an additional 3 games off the bench as a winger replacement in 2013. O’Donnell spent the rest of the season playing Waikato development. The following year O’Donnell did not secure a contract for Waikato or Taranaki 2014.

After a year away from provincial rugby, he returned to Taranaki in 2015, providing cover for the injured Jamison Gibson-Park. His real breakthrough in the 15-man game came in 2016 when he was able to win the starting number 9 jersey at Taranaki from Te Toiroa Tahuriorangi and put in a series of good performances in a season which saw the Bulls reach the Premiership semi-finals. O'Donnell broke his leg in the quarter-final against Auckland and missed the semi-final which Taranaki lost to the Tasman Makos.

O'Donnell started his super rugby season recovering from his broken leg and made no appearances for the Hurricanes in 2017. Returning with a vengeance for the Mitre 10 Cup at the end of the season O'Donnell put together some great cameo performances for the Port Taranaki Bulls, But was unable to cement a regular starting spot from Te Toiroa Tahuriorangi. At the conclusion of Mitre 10 Cup O'Donnell was a late addition to the Chiefs pre-season as a replacement player for 2018.

Yet again, O'Donnell went full circle and made the decision to move back home to Waikato. Plagued by Achilles tendinitis he made only 4 appearances for the Waikato team and starting only 2 games. He also played in the final off the bench at FMG STADIUM. Waikato went on to win the championship division over Otago.

In 2020 O'Donnell made a return to Taranaki where he made an appearance twice off the bench. One game against Otago where Taranaki were defeated in a match for the Ranfurly Shield. The other against Northland.

== Super Rugby ==
After a long provincial career, O'Donnell finally landed a Super Rugby contract with the defending champions, the Hurricanes in 2017.

== International ==
O'Donnell was an All Blacks Sevens representative from 2011 until 2012, competing in 5 World Rugby Sevens Series events and scoring 3 tries. He also holds the All Blacks Sevens all time beep test record. With an unprecedented score of 15.6 the highest Sir Gordon tietjens had ever seen in a NZ sevens camp. He said "Caleb Ralph nearly hit 15 once and Roger Randle is also right up there but 15.6 is staggering". (from The Daily Post -Rotorua, Jan 21, 2012). https://www.topendsports.com/testing/results/beep-test.htm https://www.nzherald.co.nz/sport/rugby/rugby-sevens/rugby-odonnell-called-into-new-zealand-sevens-squad/ZKDNX3EB27VGVR4Z3PDT3WNF3I/?c_id=80&objectid=10805415
