= Hoani Matenga =

New Zealand rugby player and musician

- Born: Hoani Meihana Matenga; 13 April 1987 (age 39) Christchurch, New Zealand
- Height: 1.93 m (6 ft 4 in)
- Weight: 115 kg (254 lb)

Rugby union career
- Position(s): Lock, Flanker, Number 8
- Current team: Bay of Plenty
Senior career
| Years | Team | Apps | (Points) |
| 2008–2010 | Otago | 26 | (5) |
| 2011–2017 | Stade Montois | 34 | (0) |
| 2013–2014 | Kubota Spears | 13 | (0) |
| 2015–2016 | Wellington | 22 | (15) |
| 2016 | Blues | 9 | (0) |
| 2017–2018 | Alcobendas | 17 | (5) |
| 2018– | Bay of Plenty | 9 | (0) |
- Correct as of 17 March 2019
International career
| Years | Team | Apps | (Points) |
| 2006 | New Zealand U19 | 5 | (0) |
| 2018 | Māori All Blacks | 1 | (0) |
- Correct as of 4 November 2018

Hoani Matenga is a professional rugby player and musician for Six60. He has represented New Zealand in the Māori All Blacks, and has played professionally in France, Japan, Spain and New Zealand. Matenga is also known as a musician, as an early member of the band Six60. He can play electric bass, and in the position of either lock or loose forward.

Born in Christchurch, he attended Christchurch Boys' High School and played for their first XV. In 2009, Matenga graduated from the University of Otago with degrees in marketing and tourism.

Matenga made his starting debut for Otago in their Ranfurly Shield challenge against Canterbury on 12 September 2009. He was a part of the Highlanders' wider training squad for the 2010 Super Rugby season. In 2011 he signed with Stade Montois in France. Looking for a better salary and easier rugby Matenga signed with the Kubota Spears in the Top League in Japan for the 2012–13 season.

On the 28 October 2015 Matenga was named in the Blues squad for the 2016 Super Rugby Season.

Matenga was an original member of the New Zealand band, Six60, playing as a Bass guitarist.

== Personal life ==
Matenga is a New Zealander of Māori descent (Rangitane and Te Whānau-ā-Apanui descent).

== Filmography ==
=== Film ===
| Year | Title | Role | Notes |
|---|---|---|---|
| 2020 | SIX60: Till the Lights Go Out | Himself | |
