= Travis Elementary School =

Travis Elementary School may refer to:

- William B. Travis Elementary School - Houston Independent School District - Houston, Texas
- Travis Elementary School - Travis Unified School District - Travis Air Force Base, California
- William B. Travis Elementary School - Ennis Independent School District - Ennis, Texas
- Travis Elementary School - Harlingen Consolidated Independent School District - Harlingen, Texas
- Travis Elementary School - Lamar Consolidated Independent School District - Rosenberg, Texas
- William B. Travis Elementary School - Marshall Independent School District - Marshall, Texas
- Travis Elementary School - San Marcos Consolidated Independent School District - San Marcos, Texas
