= Toʻo Vaega =

Samoa international rugby union player

- Born: Toʻo Malo Vaega; 17 August 1965 (age 61) Motoʻotua, Samoa
- Height: 1.80 m (5 ft 11 in)
- Weight: 90 kg (14 st 2 lb; 198 lb)
- Notable relative: Cardiff Vaega (son)

Rugby union career
- Position: Centre
Amateur team(s)
| Years | Team | Apps | (Points) |
| 1988-1990 | Suburbs | | |
| 1991 | Hastings High School Old Boys | | |
| 1995-1997 | Star Rugby Club | | |
| 2000 | Waitakere City | | |
Senior career
| Years | Team | Apps | (Points) |
| 1993-1994 | Moataʻa | | |
Provincial / State sides
| Years | Team | Apps | (Points) |
| 1988-1990 | Auckland | | |
| 1990-1991 | Auckland B | | |
| 1991 | Hawke's Bay | | |
| 1992 | Auckland | | |
| 1995-1997 | Southland | | |
| 2000 | Bay of Plenty | | |
Super Rugby
| Years | Team | Apps | (Points) |
| 1996–97 | Highlanders | 13 | (20) |
| 2000 | Blues | 1 | (0) |
International career
| Years | Team | Apps | (Points) |
| 1986-2001 | Samoa | 61 | (71) |

Toʻo Vaega (born 17 August 1965) is a retired professional rugby union footballer, best known for his long career with the Samoan national team.

Vaega was born in Motoʻotua.

== Career ==
Vaega made his debut for Samoa against Wales on 14 June 1986, starting one of the longest international careers in modern rugby union history. By the time of his final cap against Ireland on 11 November 2001, he had represented his country 61 times in a 15-year period.

Vaega starred for Samoa in three Rugby World Cupss, but is most remembered for scoring a critical try in Samoa's historic 16–13 victory over Wales in Cardiff during the 1991 Rugby World Cup.

Outside of his duties with the Samoan national team, Vaega enjoyed a long club career in New Zealand, most notably with Southland and the Highlanders in the mid-1990s. He was an original Highlander in the first Super 12 campaign in 1996, and set a franchise record with three tries in a match that year against Western Province, a record he shares to this day.

Vaega's son Cardiff Vaega, named for the site of Samoa's victory over Wales in 1991, is currently playing for Counties Manukau in the Mitre 10 Cup competition.
