= Te Toiroa Tahuriorangi =

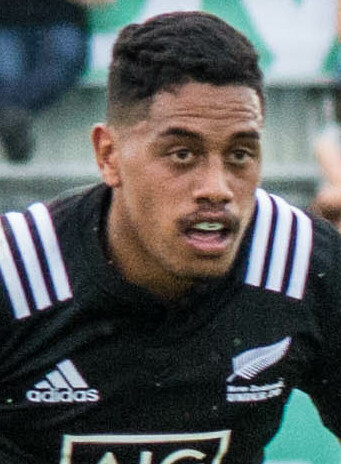
- Tahuriorangi in 2015
- Full name: Hohepa Te Toiroa Tahuriorangi
- Born: 31 March 1995 (age 31) Rotorua, New Zealand
- Height: 174 cm (5 ft 9 in)
- Weight: 85 kg (187 lb; 13 st 5 lb)
- School: Rotorua Boys' High School

Rugby union career
- Position: Half-back
- Current team: Bay of Plenty, Chiefs
Senior career
Years	Team	Apps	(Points)
2015–2019	Taranaki	41	(25)
2016–2017	Hurricanes	11	(0)
2018–2021	Chiefs	56	(25)
2020–	Bay of Plenty	51	(30)
2021	Waikato	1	(0)
2022	Crusaders	6	(0)
2023–	Chiefs	4	(0)
- Correct as of 20 October 2024
International career
Years	Team	Apps	(Points)
2015	New Zealand U20	8	(5)
2017–2020	Māori All Blacks	4	(0)
2018	New Zealand	3	(5)
- Correct as of 20 October 2024

Hohepa Te Toiroa Tahuriorangi (Māori pronunciation: [tɛ toiɾɔa taːhʉɾiɔɾaŋi]) (born 31 March 1995) is a New Zealand rugby union player who currently plays as a half-back for the Bay of Plenty Steamers in the Mitre 10 Cup and the Chiefs in Super Rugby. In 2018 Tahuriorangi was selected to play for the All Blacks.

== Playing career ==
=== Domestic career ===
Tahuriorangi was born and raised in Rotorua, where he has tribal links to Ngāti Pikiao and Ngāti Whakaue. He attended Rotorua Primary School and then Rotorua Boys High School. Following the end of High School, Tahuriorangi moved to Taranaki where he played for the New Plymouth Old Boys Premier Team in 2014–15. An impressive performance saw Tahuriorangi's selection for two national teams in 2015, firstly New Zealand U20 and then NZ Barbarians. In what later proved to be a stellar year, Tahuriorangi was announced in the 2015 lineup for Taranaki in the ITM Cup as well as Hurricanes in the Super Rugby for 2016.

Completing a two-year stint with the Hurricanes Tahuriorangi was signed up by the Chiefs for the 2018 season. Brad Weber, the Chiefs resident halfback, spent much of the early 2018 season nursing an injury leaving Tahuriorangi to make the most out of extra time on the field.

In August 2021, Tahuriorangi signed for the Crusaders for the 2022 Super Rugby Pacific season. He cited Scott Robertson as a figure who attracted him to the franchise. In March 2022, he was named to start for his first Crusaders appearance against Moana Pasifika.

=== International career ===
In 2017 Tahuriorangi was called into the Maori All Blacks for their match with the British & Irish Lions in Rotorua. Tahuriorangi did not take the field however in the wet encounter.

Tahuriorangi's performance caught the attention of All Black selectors who were searching for a third halfback following Tawera Kerr-Barlow's departure to France.

Tahuriorangi was announced as the third halfback for the All Blacks in May 2018. In only his second test, Tahuriorangi received the starting number 9 jersey and scored his first test try in a dominant victory over Japan.
