= Whetu Douglas =

NZ Maori international rugby union player

- Full name: Whetukamokamo Douglas
- Born: 18 April 1991 (age 35) Rotorua, New Zealand
- Height: 190 cm (6 ft 3 in)
- Weight: 110 kg (243 lb; 17 st 5 lb)
- School: Gisborne Boys High School
- University: The University of Waikato

Rugby union career
- Position(s): Number 8, Flanker, Lock
- Current team: Secom Rugguts
Senior career
Years	Team	Apps	(Points)
2013–2016	Waikato	36	(40)
2017–21	Crusaders	39	(35)
2017–2018	Benetton	13	(0)
2018–2020	Canterbury	22	(5)
2021	Bay of Plenty	3	(0)
2022-2023	NEC Green Rockets	30	(10)
2023-	Secom Rugguts	43	(85)
- Correct as of 3 July 2021
International career
Years	Team	Apps	(Points)
2016–	Māori All Blacks	7	(5)
- Correct as of 3 July 2021

Whetukamokamo H. Douglas (born 18 April 1991) is a New Zealand rugby union player who currently plays as a loose forward for Secom Rugguts in Japans division three competition League one.

== Senior career ==
Douglas debuted for Waikato in a match against Horowhenua-Kapiti in 2013 and to the end of the 2016 Mitre 10 Cup season had made 36 National Provincial Championship and Ranfurly Shield challenge appearances and scored 8 tries.

He was named co-captain of Canterbury for the 2018 Mitre 10 Cup season.

In 2019 Douglas made a return to the Crusaders for the 2019 Investec Super Rugby season after a stint at Italian club Benetton.

== International ==
He was named in the Māori All Blacks squad for their northern hemisphere tour in November 2016.
