= Teddy Stanaway =

- Born: Teddy Zachery Berwyn Pai Stanaway-Teo; 3 August 1989 (age 37) Auckland, New Zealand
- Height: 1.87 m (6 ft 2 in)
- Weight: 100 kg (15 st 10 lb)
- School: Papakura High School; Saint Kentigern College
- Occupation: Professional Rugby Player

Rugby union career
- Position: Centre
- Current team: Stade rochelais
Amateur team(s)
Years	Team	Apps	(Points)
- Auckland University Rugby Football Club
Provincial / State sides
Years	Team	Apps	(Points)
2009−11	Auckland	8	(5)
2014−	Bay of Plenty	8	(15)
- Correct as of 21 October 2016
International career
Years	Team	Apps	(Points)
2009	New Zealand U-20	2	(10)
National sevens team
Years	Team		Comps
2015-2018	New Zealand 7s		8

Teddy Zachery Berwyn Pai Stanaway-Teao (born 3 August 1989 in Rotorua, New Zealand) is a professional rugby player (outside back) contracted by Oyonnax in northern France. Stanaway made his first class debut for the senior Auckland rugby team in 2009 against Counties Manukau in a pre-season game, and was part of the full squad for the 2009 Air New Zealand cup where he continued to play through to 2011. He went on to represent Bay of Plenty rugby union making his BOP Steamers debut in 2014. In 2015 Stanaway made the All Blacks 7's squad where he was involved in 3 HSBC world series campaigns and was named in the rugby 7's squad to represent New Zealand at the 2016 Rio Olympics. Stanaway went on to win Gold at the 2018 Commonwealth games before signing with French side USO Oyonnax.

A member of the Cook Islands U20 team for the 2008 IRB Junior World Championship. The following year selected for the New Zealand national under-20 rugby union team winners of the 2009 IRB Junior World Championship Tokyo, Japan.

Teddy founded Ora CBD alongside Liam Messam in 2020.

Teddy attended Papakura High School before transferring to Saint Kentigern College.

Of Māori descent, Stanaway affiliates to the Ngāti Tūwharetoa iwi.
