= Iliesa Ratuva Tavuyara =

Fijian-Italian international rugby union player (born 1990)

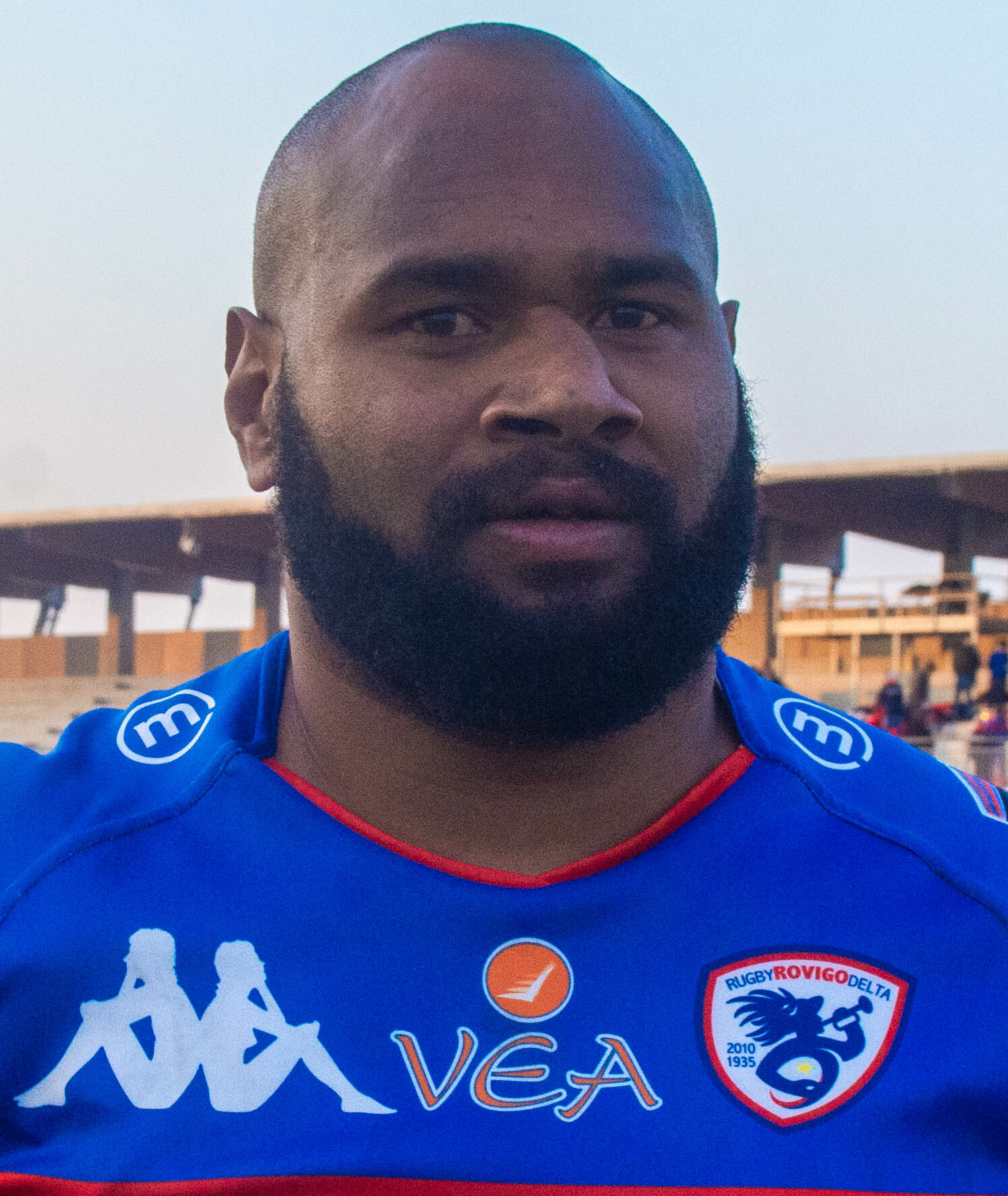
- Iliesa Ratuva Tavuyara 2023
- Born: 27 June 1990 (age 36) Sigatoka, Fiji
- Height: 1.86 m (6 ft 1 in)
- Weight: 100 kg (220 lb)

Rugby union career
- Position: Wing
- Current team: Rangers Vicenza
Youth career
- Grammar TEC RC
Amateur team(s)
| Years | Team | Apps | (Points) |
| 2015–2016 | Old Boys | | |
Senior career
| Years | Team | Apps | (Points) |
| 2015 | King Country | 10 | (50) |
| 2016–2017 | Waikato | 15 | (35) |
| 2017–2018 | Bordeaux-Bègles | – | (–) |
| 2018–2022 | Benetton Rugby | 56 | (75) |
| 2022–2023 | Rovigo Delta | 13 | (20) |
| 2023–2025 | Valorugby Emilia | 22 | (20) |
| 2025– | Rangers Vicenza | | |
- Correct as of 25 Mar 2023
International career
| Years | Team | Apps | (Points) |
| 2021 | Italy A | 1 | (5) |
| 2021 | Italy | 1 | (0) |
- Correct as of 20 Nov 2021

Iliesa Ratuva Tavuyara (born 27 June 1990) is an Fijan-born Italian rugby union player. His usual position is as a Wing and he currently plays for Rangers Vicenza after the experience with Valorugby Emilia in Serie A Elite.

From 2017 to 2018, he played with Waikato in NPC and in 2017–18 season he moved to France to play with Espoirs squad of Bordeaux-Bègles. He played with Benetton in Pro14 and URC from 2018 to 2022. In December 2022, he signed for Rovigo Delta in Top10 for the rest of 2022−23 season.

On 8 November 2021 he was named in the Italy A squad for the 2021 end-of-year rugby union internationals. On 15 November 2021, Iliesa Ratuva Tavuyara was called up from the Italy A by Kieran Crowley to be part of an Italy 35-man squad for the 2021 end-of-year rugby union internationals. He made his debut against Uruguay.
