= Connor Collett =

English rugby union player

- Born: Connor Nicholas D. Collett; 5 February 1996 (age 30) Huntingdon, England
- Height: 1.85 m (6 ft 1 in)
- Weight: 103 kg (16 st 3 lb)

Rugby union career
- Position: Flanker
- Current team: Newcastle Falcons
Senior career
Years	Team	Apps	(Points)
2018–	Newcastle Falcons		
- Correct as of 28 December 2020
- Correct as of 28 December 2020

Connor Collett (born 5 February 1996) is an English rugby union player who last played for Newcastle Falcons from 2018 to 2023.
