= Joe Reynolds (rugby union) =

- Born: Joe Reynolds; 30 December 1989 (age 36) New Zealand
- Height: 5 ft 10 in (1.78 m)
- Weight: 89 kg (14 st 0 lb)

Rugby union career
- Position: Fly-half / Centre
Amateur team(s)
Years	Team	Apps	(Points)
2013–19	Currie		
Provincial / State sides
Years	Team	Apps	(Points)
2016	Counties Manukau Steelers	6	(16)
Super Rugby
Years	Team	Apps	(Points)
2019	Watsonians	2	(10)

Joe Reynolds (born 30 December 1989) is a New Zealand rugby union player who played for Currie and Watsonians Super 6 team at the Fly-half position. He can also cover at Centre. He previously played for Counties Manukau Steelers in New Zealand. He has also played in a pre-season game for Glasgow Warriors.

== Rugby Union career ==
=== Amateur career ===
Reynolds played for Currie Chieftains. He started with Currie in 2013 but his first season was marred by a broken wrist.

=== Professional career ===
Reynolds previously played for Counties Manukau Steelers in New Zealand and won 6 caps for the side. He won the AS Wilcox Premier Club player of the year with the club in 2017. He was named in the 2017 University of Waikato Chiefs Taua Development squad.

Reynolds has been training full time with the Warriors during the 2018-19 pre-season.

He made his first appearance for the Warriors in their pre-season 50 -17 demolition of Harlequins at North Inch, Perth on the 18 August 2018.

Reynolds now plays for Super 6 side Watsonians.
