= Cardiff Vaega =

New Zealand rugby union player

- Born: Cardiff Vaega; 23 September 1991 (age 35) Auckland, New Zealand
- Height: 1.83 m (6 ft 0 in)
- Weight: 100 kg (15 st 10 lb; 220 lb)
- School: Kelston Boys' High School
- Notable relative: To'o Vaega (father)

Rugby union career
- Position: Midfield
Senior career
| Years | Team | Apps | (Points) |
| 2014–2015 | Pau | 5 | (0) |
| 2018–2019 | Valorugby Emilia | 20 | (25) |
| 2020−2021 | Valorugby Emilia | 18 | (20) |
| 2021− | Tomitanii Constanța | | |
Provincial / State sides
| Years | Team | Apps | (Points) |
| 2011–2014 | Southland | 34 | (30) |
| 2015–2016 | Counties Manukau | 21 | (15) |
| 2017 | Hawke's Bay | 10 | (20) |
| 2018−2019 | Counties Manukau | 18 | (10) |
- Correct as of 23 October 2016
Super Rugby
| Years | Team | Apps | (Points) |
| 2014 | Hurricanes | 1 | (0) |
| 2015 | Blues | 3 | (5) |
- Correct as of 30 March 2014

Cardiff Vaega (born 23 September 1991 in Auckland, New Zealand) is a New Zealand rugby union player. He plays in the centre position for the Romanian based SuperLiga team Tomitanii Constanța.

Vaega is also son of To'o Vaega, who played for Southland and the Highlanders among other sides in New Zealand. To'o also played for Samoa he had represented his country 61 times in a 15-year period. Starting one of the longest international careers in modern rugby union history.

== Playing career ==
Vaega studied at Auckland rugby powerhouse Kelston Boys' High School – where he was a member of the First XV for four seasons. Cardiff had shifted to Invercargill with an ambition of furthering his rugby and cracking Southland in the next few years. He balanced his time in the academy with his studies at the Southern Institute of Technology, where he was in the first year of a Bachelor of Sport and Recreation. Vaega, played his club rugby with Star, he was also approached by Otago, but said several factors swayed him to Southland.

He made his provincial debut with the side in 2011 season's ITM Cup against Bay of Plenty. He ran strongly with the ball and was rewarded with a try. In 2014 He played for the Wellington based Super Rugby side the Hurricanes, and for provincial side Southland. Vaega has also represented at under-17 level for New Zealand. He made his debut for Southland in 2011 and his strong performances saw him named in the Hurricanes squad for the 2014 Super Rugby season.

In 2020−2021 season he played for Italian based Top12 team Valorugby Emilia.
