= Jack Stratton (rugby union) =

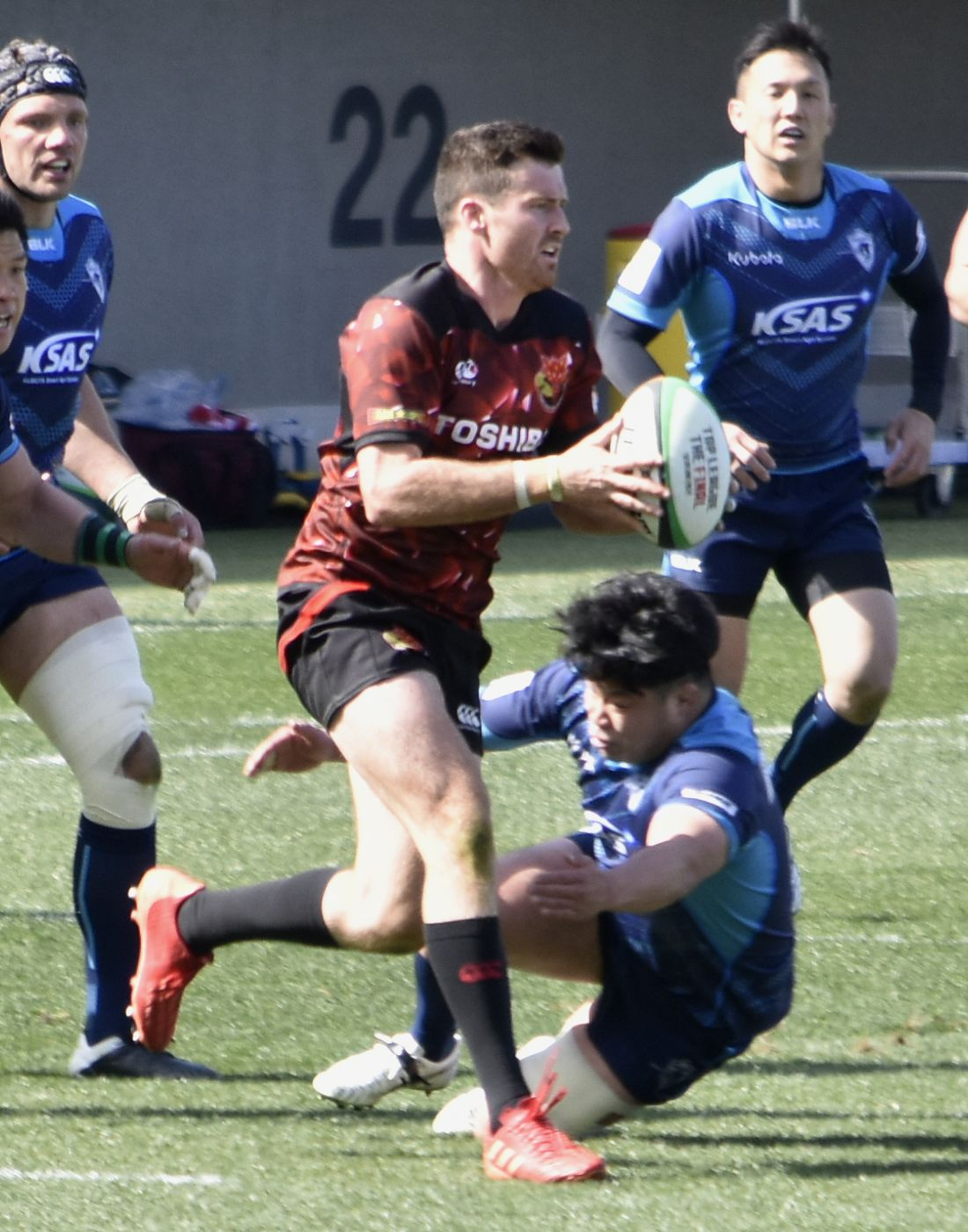
- Born: 21 August 1994 (age 32) Taihape
- Height: 185 cm (6 ft 1 in)
- Weight: 92 kg (14 st 7 lb; 203 lb)
- University: Lincoln University

Rugby union career
- Position(s): Scrum-half, Fly-half
- Current team: Mitsubishi DynaBoars
Senior career
Years	Team	Apps	(Points)
2020–2023	Toshiba Brave Lupus	36	(80)
2023–	Mitsubishi DynaBoars	22	(10)
- Correct as of 21 February 2021
Provincial / State sides
Years	Team	Apps	(Points)
2015–2017	Canterbury	22	(25)
2018–2019	Waikato	21	(5)
Super Rugby
Years	Team	Apps	(Points)
2018	Crusaders	1	(5)

Jack Stratton (born 21 August 1994) is a New Zealand rugby union player who plays for the Crusaders in the Super Rugby competition. His position of choice is scrum-half.
