= Ambrose Curtis =

- Born: 17 April 1992 (age 34)
- Height: 1.93 m (6 ft 4 in)
- Weight: 96 kg (15 st 2 lb; 212 lb)
- School: Wellington College

Rugby union career
- Position: Wing
- Current team: Vannes
Senior career
Years	Team	Apps	(Points)
2012−14	Wellington	20	(20)
2015−2017	Manawatu	27	(35)
2018	Wasps	1	(0)
2018−2022	Vannes	62	(90)
- Correct as of 16 July 2022
International career
Years	Team	Apps	(Points)
2012	New Zealand U20	4	(10)
2016–	Māori All Blacks	3	(10)
- Correct as of 16 December 2017

Ambrose Curtis (born 17 April 1992) is a New Zealand rugby union player who currently plays as a winger for Manawatu in the Mitre 10 Cup.

== Career ==
Curtis made his Wellington debut in 2012 against Manawatu and went on to establish himself as a regular starter and try-scorer for the Lions over the next 2 seasons. Despite a substandard showing by his province in 2014 in which they were relegated from the ITM Cup Premiership, Curtis's own form was strong.

Curtis signed with Manawatu in August 2015 on a week by week basis.

In May 2018, it was announced that Curtis Ambrose had signed for Gallagher Premiership team Wasps.

== International career ==
Curtis was a member of the New Zealand Under-20 side which competed in the 2012 IRB Junior World Championship in South Africa and was also a regular member of the All Blacks sevens side during the 2013 and 2014 seasons.
