= Travis Taylor (rugby union) =

- Born: 22 February 1995 (age 31) Waipukurau, New Zealand
- Height: 1.8 m (5 ft 11 in)
- Weight: 101 kg (223 lb)

Rugby union career
- Position: Hooker
Amateur team(s)
Years	Team	Apps	(Points)
- Varsity
–	Fielding (Yellows)		
Provincial / State sides
Years	Team	Apps	(Points)
2016	Manawatu	7	(10)
- Correct as of 16 October 2016

Travis Taylor (born 22 February 1995) is a New Zealand rugby union player who currently plays for Manawatu in the Mitre 10 Cup. His position of choice is hooker.

Originally from Waipukurau, Taylor has captained the Manawatu U19s and been a part of the Manawatu development squad.

Taylor made his debut for the Manawatu senior squad in 2016. On 1 October 2016, in a 30–21 loss against Hawke's Bay, Taylor scored two tries.
