= Solomona Sakalia =

- Full name: Solomona Levi Sakalia
- Born: 2 February 1991 (age 35) Wellington, New Zealand
- Height: 190 cm (6 ft 3 in)
- Weight: 122 kg (269 lb; 19 st 3 lb)
- School: Wellington College

Rugby union career
- Position: Loosehead Prop
- Current team: Wellington
Senior career
Years	Team	Apps	(Points)
2012, 2022–	Wellington	7	(0)
2014–2018	Bay of Plenty	40	(10)
2020	Manawatu	5	(0)
- Correct as of 28 July 2022
International career
Years	Team	Apps	(Points)
2011	New Zealand U20	5	(0)
- Correct as of 5 November 2012

Solomona Sakalia (born 2 February 1991) is a New Zealand rugby union player, who currently plays as a loosehead prop for Wellington in New Zealand's domestic National Provincial Championship competition.

In October 2012, he was named in the Chiefs squad for the 2013 Super Rugby season, but did not play a Super Rugby game for the franchise. He did play two games for the Chiefs Development team in 2013.

Sakalia was a member of the New Zealand Under 20 side that won the 2011 IRB Junior World Championship.
