= 2017 Mitre 10 Cup =

2017 rugby union competition in New Zealand

2017 Mitre 10 Cup season
- Countries: New Zealand
- Date: 17 August – 28 October
- Champions: Canterbury
- Runners-up: Tasman
- Promoted: Wellington
- Relegated: Waikato
- Matches played: 76
- Tries scored: 589 (average 7.8 per match)
- Top point scorer: Richie Mo'unga (Canterbury); 160 points
- Top try scorer: Tevita Li (North Harbour); 11 tries

Official website
- www.provincial.rugby

The 2017 Mitre 10 Cup season was the twelfth season of New Zealand's provincial rugby union competition since it turned professional in 2006. The regular season began on August 17, when North Harbour hosted Otago. It involved the top fourteen rugby unions of New Zealand. For sponsorship reasons, the competition was known as the Mitre 10 Cup and it was the second season under the lead sponsor. The winner of the Championship, Wellington was promoted to the Premiership, while the seventh-placed Premiership team, Waikato was relegated to the Championship.

== Format ==
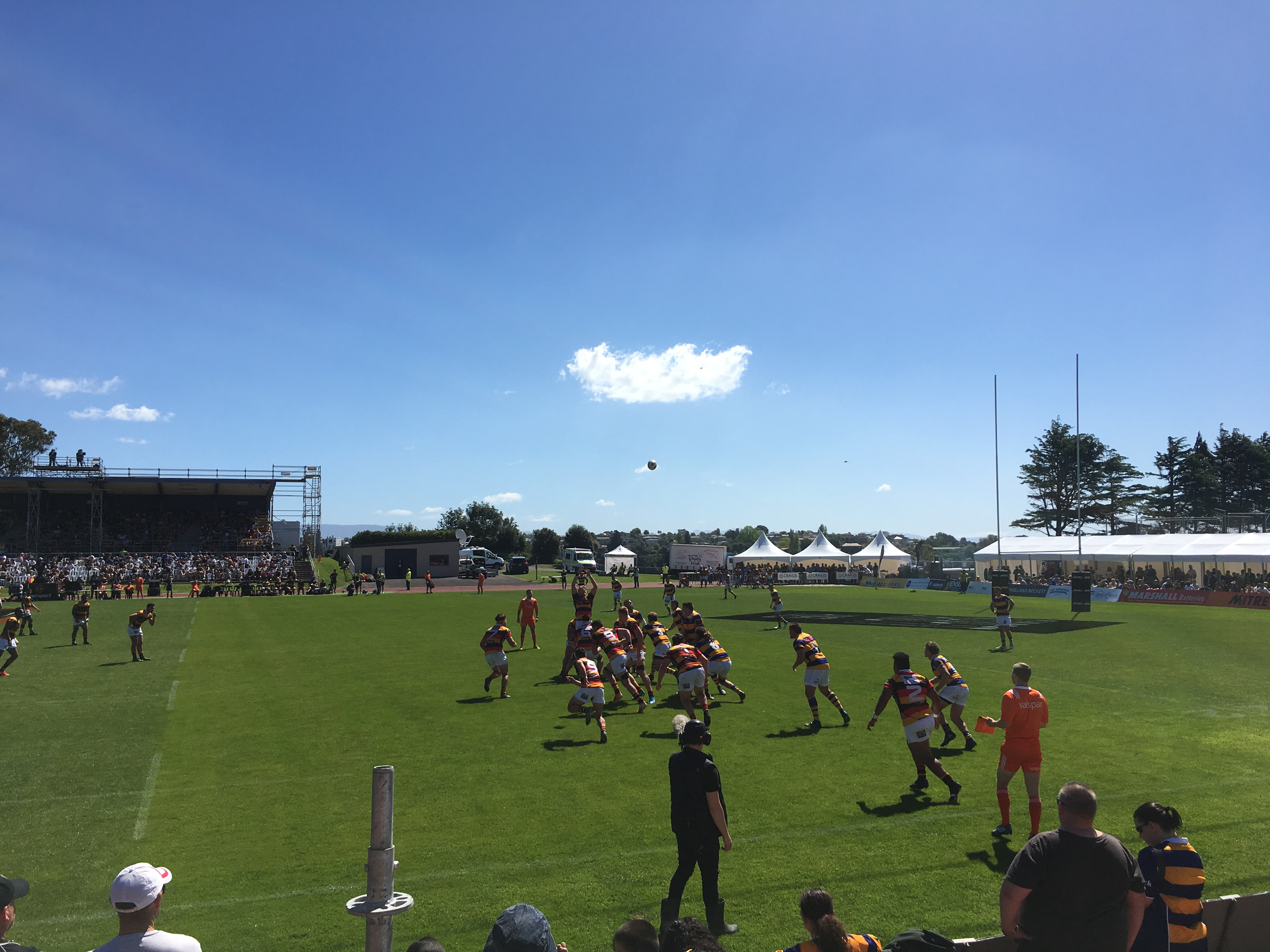
Waikato vs Bay of Plenty in Week 9

The Mitre 10 Cup standings were sorted by a competition points system. Four points were awarded to the winning team, a draw equaled two points, while a loss amounted to zero points. Unions could also win their side a respectable bonus point. To receive a bonus point, they must have scored four tries or more or lose by seven or fewer points or less. Each team was placed on their total points received. If necessary of a tiebreaker, when two or more teams finish on equal points, the union who defeated the other in a head-to-head got placed higher. In case of a draw between them, the side with the biggest points differential margin got rights to be ranked above. If they were tied on points difference, it was then decided by a highest scored try count or a coin toss. This seeding format was implemented since the beginning of the 2006 competition.

The competition included a promotion-relegation process with the winner of the Championship receiving automatic promotion to the Premiership, replacing the seventh-placed team in the Premiership which was relegated to the Championship for the following year. The regular season consisted of two types of matches. The internal division matches were when each team played the other six unions in their division once, home or away. The cross-division matches were when each team played four teams from the other division, thus missing out on three teams, each from the opposite division. Each union played home or away games against teams from the other division, making a total of ten competition games for each union. The finals format allowed the top four teams from each division move on to the semi-finals. The top two division winners, based on table points, received a home semi-final. In the first round of the finals, the semi-finals, the second division winner hosted the third division winner, and the first division winner hosted the fourth division winner. The final was hosted by the top remaining seed.

== Standings ==
Source: Mitre 10 Cup standings 2017

Premiership Division
#	Team	GP	W	D	L	PF	PA	PD	TB	LB	PTS
1	RS – Taranaki	10	8	0	2	390	318	+72	10	0	42
2	Canterbury	10	8	0	2	445	246	+199	9	0	41
3	North Harbour	10	8	0	2	331	223	+108	4	1	37
4	Tasman	10	6	0	4	275	306	–31	7	0	31
5	Counties Manukau	10	5	1	4	257	297	–40	4	1	27
6	Auckland	10	3	0	7	235	298	–63	4	2	18
7	Waikato	10	2	0	8	213	293	–80	5	4	17

Championship Division
#	Team	GP	W	D	L	PF	PA	PD	TB	LB	PTS
1	Wellington	10	9	0	1	407	207	+200	10	1	47
2	Bay of Plenty	10	5	1	4	285	251	+34	5	1	28
3	Otago	10	4	0	6	331	269	+62	5	5	26
4	Northland	10	5	0	5	264	221	+43	4	1	25
5	Manawatu	10	4	0	6	278	287	–9	5	3	24
6	Hawke's Bay	10	2	0	8	203	398	–195	2	1	11
7	Southland	10	0	0	10	154	454	–300	0	1	1

=== Standings progression ===
Premiership
Team	W1	W2	W3	W4	W5	W6	W7	W8	W9
Auckland	1 (6th)	5 (5th)	5 (7th)	6 (6th)	11 (6th)	12 (7th)	17 (5th)	17 (6th)	18 (6th)
Canterbury	5 (1st)	10 (1st)	15 (1st)	20 (1st)	25 (1st)	30 (1st)	35 (1st)	36 (2nd)	41 (2nd)
Counties Manukau	4 (4th)	4 (6th)	5 (5th)	5 (7th)	10 (7th)	13 (6th)	17 (6th)	22 (5th)	27 (5th)
North Harbour	4 (3rd)	9 (2nd)	14 (2nd)	18 (2nd)	22 (2nd)	23 (3rd)	27 (3rd)	32 (3rd)	37 (3rd)
Taranaki	5 (2nd)	6 (4th)	11 (4th)	16 (3rd)	21 (3rd)	26 (2nd)	31 (2nd)	36 (1st)	42 (1st)
Tasman	0 (7th)	0 (7th)	5 (6th)	10 (5th)	15 (4th)	20 (4th)	21 (4th)	30 (4th)	31 (4th)
Waikato	2 (5th)	7 (3rd)	14 (3rd)	14 (4th)	14 (5th)	14 (5th)	14 (7th)	15 (7th)	17 (7th)
Championship
Team	W1	W2	W3	W4	W5	W6	W7	W8	W9
Bay of Plenty	1 (5th)	6 (2nd)	6 (4th)	10 (4th)	10 (5th)	18 (3rd)	18 (5th)	23 (3rd)	28 (2nd)
Hawke's Bay	4 (3rd)	4 (5th)	4 (6th)	5 (6th)	5 (6th)	5 (6th)	6 (6th)	6 (6th)	11 (6th)
Manawatu	1 (6th)	6 (3rd)	6 (5th)	7 (5th)	11 (4th)	16 (5th)	21 (3rd)	22 (4th)	24 (5th)
Northland	5 (2nd)	6 (4th)	11 (2nd)	16 (2nd)	16 (2nd)	16 (4th)	20 (4th)	25 (2nd)	25 (4th)
Otago	1 (4th)	3 (6th)	8 (3rd)	13 (3rd)	14 (3rd)	19 (2nd)	21 (2nd)	21 (5th)	26 (3rd)
Southland	0 (7th)	0 (7th)	0 (7th)	0 (7th)	0 (7th)	0 (7th)	1 (7th)	1 (7th)	1 (7th)
Wellington	5 (1st)	10 (1st)	15 (1st)	22 (1st)	27 (1st)	32 (1st)	37 (1st)	42 (1st)	47 (1st)
The table above shows a team's progression throughout the season. For each week, their cumulative points total is shown with the overall division log position in brackets.
Key:	Win	Draw	Loss	Bye					

== Regular season ==
The 2017 Mitre 10 Cup played across nine weeks with every team playing one Wednesday night fixture in a double-up round where they played twice that week. The competition started on Thursday, August 17, with North Harbour taking on Otago at QBE Stadium, in a repeat of the previous seasons Championship Division final. The opening round saw a repeat of the Premiership final with Tasman against the then current champions Canterbury.

=== Week 1 ===
17 August 2017
19:35 NZST

North Harbour	19–17	Otago
Try: Shaun Stevenson 29'; Con: Bryn Gatland (1/1) 30'; Pen: Bryn Gatland (4/6) 14', 17', 26', 44'	Report	Try: Jonathan Ruru 60'; Mitchell Scott 66'; Con: Josh Ioane (2/2) 61', 67'; Pen: Josh Ioane (1/1) 55'

North Harbour Stadium, Albany
Referee: Glen Jackson

18 August 2017
19:35 NZST

Tasman	0–39	Canterbury
Pen: Mitchell Hunt (0/2)	Report	Try: George Bridge 8'; Dominic Bird 36'; Luke Whitelock 67'; Rob Thompson 75'; Mitchell Dunshea 79'; Con: Richie Mo'unga (3/3) 9', 37', 68'; Brett Cameron (1/2) 80'; Pen: Richie Mo'unga (2/2) 14', 33'

Trafalgar Park, Nelson
Referee: Ben O'Keeffe

19 August 2017
14:35 NZST

Hawke's Bay	24–16	Southland
Try: To'o Junior Vaega 48'; Tiaan Falcon 57'; Marino Mikaele-Tu'u 68'; Con: Ihaia West (3/3) 49', 58', 69'; Pen: Ihaia West (1/1) 28'; Cards: Geoffrey Cridge (yellow card) 59'	Report	Try: Matthew Johnson 38'; Con: Scott Eade (1/1) 39'; Pen: Scott Eade (3/5) 6', 25', 53'

McLean Park, Napier
Referee: Angus Mabey

19 August 2017
17:05 NZST

Taranaki	34–29	Waikato
Try: Leighton Price 20'; Charlie Ngatai 32'; Stephen Perofeta 34'; Sean Wainui 44'; Seta Tamanivalu 59'; Beaudein Waaka 61'; Con: Marty McKenzie (2/6) 21', 33'	Report	Try: Mitch Jacobson 6'; Jordan Manihera (3) 54', 64', 73'; Con: Dwayne Sweeney (3/4) 7', 66', 73'; Pen: Dwayne Sweeney (1/1) 25'

Yarrow Stadium, New Plymouth
Referee: Nick Briant

19 August 2017
19:35 NZST

Counties Manukau	16–14	Auckland
Try: Fotu Lokotui 13'; Con: Baden Kerr (1/1) 14'; Pen: Baden Kerr (3/4) 32', 57', 75'; Cards: Sam Henwood (yellow card) 17'	Report	Try: Jono Hickey 20'; Malakai Fekitoa 45'; Con: Jono Hickey (2/2) 21', 46'; Pen: Jono Hickey (0/1)

ECOLight Stadium, Pukekohe
Referee: Cameron Stone

20 August 2017
14:35 NZST

Northland	28–23	Bay of Plenty
Try: Howard Sililoto 36'; Jack Ram 52'; Mathew Wright 58'; Jone Macilai-Tori 67'; Con: Daniel Hawkins (2/2) 37', 53'; Peter Breen (2/2) 59', 68'	Report	Try: Tom Franklin 4'; Monty Ioane 31'; Con: Mike Delany (2/2) 5', 32'; Pen: Mike Delany (3/3) 29', 39', 40'

Okara Park, Whangārei
Referee: Brendon Pickerill

20 August 2017
16:35 NZST

Manawatu	29–41	Wellington
Try: Willy Ambaka 5'; Curtis Reid 26'; Nehe Milner-Skudder 29'; Jackson Hemopo 33'; Jade Te Rure 52'; Con: Otere Black (2/5) 6', 53'	Report	Try: Sheridan Rangihuna 2'; Alex Fidow 23'; Jackson Garden-Bachop 35'; Trent Renata 39'; Julian Savea 57'; Malo Tuitama 78'; Con: Jackson Garden-Bachop (4/5) 3', 36', 40', 58'; Daniel Kirkpatrick (0/1); Pen: Daniel Kirkpatrick (1/2) 75'; Jackson Garden-Bachop (0/1)

Arena Manawatu, Palmerston North
Referee: Shuhei Kubo (Japan)

=== Week 2 ===
24 August 2017
19:35 NZST

Southland	20–45	North Harbour
Try: Matthew Johnson 6'; Liam Howley 38'; Con: Scott Eade (2/2) 7', 39'; Pen: Ryan Tongia (1/2) 17'; Scott Eade (1/2) 53'	Report	Try: Matt Vaega (2) 21', 63'; Tevita Li (2) 35', 80'; Chris Eves 45'; Shaun Stevenson 54'; Con: Bryn Gatland (2/5) 22', 46'; Ben Volavola (1/1) 80'; Pen: Bryn Gatland (2/2) 13', 50'; Ben Volavola (1/1) 69'

Rugby Park Stadium, Invercargill
Referee: Jamie Nutbrown

25 August 2017
17:45 NZST

Bay of Plenty	46–17	Hawke's Bay
Try: Siegfried Fisiihoi 12'; Lalakai Foketi 29'; Joe Webber (2) 60', 77'; Jesse Parete (2) 71', 80'; Con: Mike Delany (4/5) 13', 30', 61', 72'; Luke Campbell (1/1) 80'; Pen: Mike Delany (2/2) 35', 38'	Report	Try: Marino Mikaele-Tu'u 47'; Ihaia West 68'; Con: Ihaia West (2/2) 48', 69'; Pen: Ihaia West (1/2) 20'; Cards: Pouri Rakete-Stones (yellow card) 10'

Rotorua International Stadium, Rotorua
Referee: James Doleman

25 August 2017
19:45 NZST

Waikato	33–21	Counties Manukau
Try: Jordan Manihera (2) 4', 43'; Bailyn Sullivan 24'; James Tucker 31'; Samisoni Taukei'aho 64'; Con: Dwayne Sweeney (3/4) 5', 25', 32'; Sam Christie (1/1) 65'; Pen: Dwayne Sweeney (0/1)	Report	Try: Stephen Donald 48'; Augustine Pulu 60'; Jonathan Taumateine 70'; Con: Baden Kerr (3/3) 49', 61', 71'; Cards: Sam Henwood (yellow card) 22'

Waikato Stadium, Hamilton
Referee: Mike Fraser

26 August 2017
14:35 NZST

Wellington	42–26	Taranaki
Try: Asafo Aumua (2) 8', 65'; Ben Lam 15'; Julian Savea 18'; Regan Verney 62'; Con: Jackson Garden-Bachop (3/4) 9', 16', 19'; Daniel Kirkpatrick (1/1) 66'; Pen: Jackson Garden-Bachop (3/4) 13', 40', 44'	Report	Try: Charlie Ngatai 32'; Sean Wainui 36'; Lachlan Boshier 60'; Waisake Naholo 70'; Con: Stephen Perofeta (3/4) 33', 37', 71'

Wellington Regional Stadium, Wellington
Attendance: 3,085
Referee: Michael Lash

26 August 2017
16:35 NZST

Auckland	10–8	Northland
Try: Kurt Eklund 34'; Con: Jono Hickey (1/1) 35'; Pen: Jono Hickey (1/2) 21'; Cards: Jordan Trainor (yellow card) 10'	Report	Try: Jone Macilai-Tori 53'; Con: Daniel Hawkins (0/1); Pen: Peter Breen (1/1) 11'

Eden Park, Auckland
Attendance: 11,100
Referee: Shuhei Kubo (Japan)

27 August 2017
14:35 NZST

Manawatu	35–20	Tasman
Try: Nick Crosswell 21'; Kurt Baker 29'; Hunter Prescott 49'; Hamish Northcott 80'; Con: Otere Black (3/4) 22', 50', 80'; Pen: Otere Black (3/3) 40', 70', 74'	Report	Try: Alex Ainley 43'; Michael Green 65'; Con: Mitchell Hunt (2/2) 44', 66'; Pen: Mitchell Hunt (2/2) 5', 54'; Cards: Tima Fainga'anuku (yellow card) 64'; Jordan Taufua (yellow card) 73'

Arena Manawatu, Palmerston North
Referee: Richard Kelly

27 August 2017
16:35 NZST

RS – Canterbury	30–24	Otago
Try: Ben Funnell 18'; Mitchell Dunshea 44'; Tim Bateman 50'; Jed Brown 76'; Con: Richie Mo'unga (2/4) 51', 77'; Pen: Richie Mo'unga (2/4) 8', 79'	Report	Try: Josh Ioane 14'; Mitchell Scott 54'; Sam Anderson-Heather 65'; Jona Nareki 68'; Con: Fletcher Smith (2/3) 55', 66'; Josh Ioane (0/1); Pen: Josh Ioane (0/2)

Rugby League Park, Christchurch
Referee: Paul Williams

=== Week 3 ===
30 August 2017
19:35 NZST

Auckland	27–35	Waikato
Try: Patrick Tuipulotu 8'; Marcel Renata 26'; Sione Havili 73'; Con: Jordan Trainor (3/3) 9', 26', 74'; Pen: Jordan Trainor (2/3) 35', 47'; Cards: Marcel Renata (yellow card) 54'	Report	Try: Tyler Campbell 2'; Jordan Manihera 10'; Penalty try 54'; Sevu Reece 59'; Con: Matthew Lansdown (1/2) 11'; Sam Christie (1/1) 60'; Pen: Matthew Lansdown (3/3) 23', 32', 80'; Sam Christie (0/1)

Eden Park, Auckland
Attendance: 2,300
Referee: Richard Kelly

31 August 2017
19:35 NZST

Bay of Plenty	10–31	Wellington
Try: Terrence Hepetema 64'; Con: Mike Delany (1/1) 65'; Pen: Mike Delany (1/2) 49'	Report	Try: Malo Tuitama 7'; Isaia Walker-Leawere 34'; Ben Lam 51'; Wes Goosen 66'; Asafo Aumua 72'; Con: Jackson Garden-Bachop (3/5) 8', 66', 73'

Rotorua International Stadium, Rotorua
Referee: Michael Winter

1 September 2017
19:35 NZST

Hawke's Bay	10–53	Canterbury
Try: Hugh Renton 35'; Con: Ihaia West (1/1) 35'; Pen: Ihaia West (1/1) 5'	Report	Try: Brett Cameron 10'; Marshall Suckling (2) 41', 50'; Braydon Ennor (2) 63', 66'; Josh McKay 75'; Inga Finau 79'; Con: Brett Cameron (6/7) 11', 42', 51', 64', 75', 80'; Pen: Brett Cameron (2/2) 23', 39'; Cards: Nick Werahiko (yellow card) 67'

McLean Park, Napier
Referee: Cameron Stone

2 September 2017
14:35 NZST

Otago	40–30	Manawatu
Try: Jonathan Ruru 19'; Jona Nareki (3) 30', 65', 67'; Mitchell Scott 52'; Sam Anderson-Heather 57'; Con: Fletcher Smith (1/3) 58', 67'; Josh Ioane (0/3); Pen: Josh Ioane (1/2) 8'; Fletcher Smith (1/1) 72'	Report	Try: Ngani Laumape 23'; Jackson Hemopo 40'; Jamie Booth 61'; Con: Otere Black (3/3) 23', 40', 61'; Pen: Otere Black (2/2) 2', 37'; Jade Te Rure (1/1) 70'

Forsyth Barr Stadium, Dunedin
Referee: James Munro

2 September 2017
17:05 NZST

Southland	13–44	Northland
Try: Aleki Morris-Lome 70'; Con: Greg Dyer (1/1) 71'; Pen: Scott Eade (2/3) 13', 25'	Report	Try: Jack Goodhue 19'; Jordan Hyland 36'; Sam Nock 39'; Jone Macilai-Tori 59'; Solomon Alaimalo 65'; Jordan Olsen 75'; Con: Daniel Hawkins (4/5) 20', 40', 60', 66'; Tim Blundell (0/1); Pen: Daniel Hawkins (2/2) 4', 53'

Rugby Park Stadium, Invercargill
Referee: Paul Williams

2 September 2017
19:35 NZST

Taranaki	30–27	Counties Manukau
Try: Waisake Naholo (2) 36', 68'; Charlie Ngatai 56'; Ricky Riccitelli 78'; Con: Marty McKenzie (2/4) 57', 79'; Pen: Marty McKenzie (2/2) 16', 25'	Report	Try: Tevita Nabura 20'; Jonathan Taumateine 46'; Joe Royal 54'; Con: Baden Kerr (3/3) 20', 47', 54'; Pen: Baden Kerr (2/3) 6', 63'

Yarrow Stadium, New Plymouth
Referee: Angus Mabey

3 September 2017
14:35 NZST

Waikato	29–31	Tasman
Try: Loni Uhila 8'; Sevu Reece 25'; Samisoni Taukei'aho 67'; Zac Guilford 74'; Tawera Kerr-Barlow 84'; Con: Matthew Lansdown (2/4) 26', 68'; Sam Christie (0/1)	Report	Try: Billy Guyton 14'; Vernon Fredericks 22'; Will Jordan 43'; Jordan Taufua 48'; Con: Mitchell Hunt (4/4) 15', 23', 44', 49'; Pen: Mitchell Hunt (1/1) 62'; Cards: James Lowe (yellow card) 65'

Waikato Stadium, Hamilton
Referee: James Doleman

3 September 2017
16:35 NZST

North Harbour	57–10	Auckland
Try: Shaun Stevenson (2) 1', 46'; Matt Duffie 27'; Tevita Li (2) 63', 74'; James Parsons 67'; Ben Volavola 78'; Con: Bryn Gatland (5/7) 28', 47', 68', 75', 79'; Pen: Bryn Gatland (4/5) 18', 23', 45', 55'	Report	Try: George Moala 50'; Con: Jono Hickey (1/1) 51'; Pen: Jono Hickey (1/1) 20'

North Harbour Stadium, Albany
Referee: Glen Jackson

=== Week 4 ===
6 September 2017
19:35 NZST

Wellington	40–27	Hawke's Bay
Try: Julian Savea 12'; Sitiveni Paongo 20'; Alex Fidow (2) 26', 43'; Wes Goosen 48'; Malo Tuitama 71'; Con: Jackson Garden-Bachop (5/6) 13', 26', 44', 49', 71'	Report	Try: Cardiff Vaega 39'; Jason Long 65'; Sam McNicol 73'; Jorian Tangaere 78'; Con: Tiaan Falcon (2/4) 74', 79'; Pen: Tiaan Falcon (1/1) 7'

Wellington Regional Stadium, Wellington
Attendance: 2,189
Referee: Jamie Nutbrown

7 September 2017
19:35 NZST

Counties Manukau	18–27	North Harbour
Try: Luteru Laulala 40'; Tim Nanai-Williams 47'; Con: Luteru Laulala (1/2) 48'; Pen: Luteru Laulala (2/3) 8', 16'	Report	Try: Sione Mafileo 2'; Tevita Li 73'; Con: Bryn Gatland (1/1) 3'; Ben Volavola (0/1); Pen: Bryn Gatland (1/1) 12'; Ben Volavola (4/5) 22', 29', 54', 58'

ECOLight Stadium, Pukekohe
Referee: James Doleman

8 September 2017
17:45 NZST

RS – Canterbury	78–20	Southland
Try: Richie Mo'unga (2) 10', 22'; Braydon Ennor (4) 41', 44', 65', 70'; George Bridge (3) 52', 58', 73'; Josh McKay 62'; Tim Bateman 76'; Con: Richie Mo'unga (5/6) 11', 23', 45', 53', 59'; Brett Cameron (5/5) 63', 66', 71', 74', 77'; Pen: Richie Mo'unga (1/2) 3'	Report	Try: Junior Ngaluafe 34'; Neria Fomai 38'; Con: Scott Eade (2/2) 35', 39'; Pen: Scott Eade (2/2) 20', 47'; Cards: Ryan Tongia (yellow card) 54'

Rugby League Park, Christchurch
Referee: Nick Briant

8 September 2017
19:45 NZST

Manawatu	17–20	Bay of Plenty
Try: Otere Black 8'; Lewis Marshall 19'; Con: Otere Black (2/2) 8', 20'; Pen: Otere Black (1/1) 57'; Cards: Heiden Bedwell-Curtis (yellow card) 72'	Report	Try: Joe Webber 34'; Penalty try 75'; Con: Kelly Haimona (1/1) 35'; Pen: Kelly Haimona (2/2) 5', 14'

Forsyth Barr Stadium, Dunedin
Referee: Ben O'Keeffe

9 September 2017
14:35 NZST

Auckland	38–49	Taranaki
Try: Vince Aso (3) 10', 71', 80'; Marcel Renata 19'; Taleni Seu 39'; Con: Jono Hickey (1/2) 20'; Tyrone Elkington-MacDonald (1/1) 40'; Jordan Trainor (0/2); Pen: Jono Hickey (3/3) 14', 22', 45'	Report	Try: Declan O'Donnell 2'; Toa Halafihi 7'; Stephen Perofeta 33'; Te Toiroa Tahuriorangi 51'; Lachlan Boshier 58'; Kylem O'Donnell 66'; Con: Marty McKenzie (5/6) 8', 34', 52', 59', 67'; Pen: Marty McKenzie (2/2) 44', 74'; Stephen Perofeta (1/1) 57'

Eden Park, Auckland
Attendance: 5,200
Referee: Mike Fraser

9 September 2017
16:35 NZST

Northland	37–7	Waikato
Try: Solomon Alaimalo 10'; Ross Wright 19'; Jack Ram 58'; Jack Goodhue 73'; Jone Macilai-Tori 80'; Con: Daniel Hawkins (2/3) 20', 59'; Tim Blundell (1/2) 74'; Pen: Daniel Hawkins (2/4) 28', 40'	Report	Try: Adam Burn 76'; Con: Matthew Lansdown (1/1) 77'; Cards: James Tucker (yellow card) 27'

Okara Park, Whangārei
Referee: Michael Lash

10 September 2017
14:35 NZST

Tasman	37–35	Wellington
Try: Tim Perry 34'; Will Jordan 51'; James Lowe 60'; Mitchell Hunt 70'; Con: Mitchell Hunt (4/4) 35', 52', 61', 71'; Pen: Mitchell Hunt (3/3) 4', 15', 68'	Report	Try: Alex Fidow 12'; Ben Lam 26'; Sam Lousi 39'; James Blackwell 45'; Losi Filipo 75'; Con: Jackson Garden-Bachop (5/5) 13', 27', 40', 46', 76'

Lansdowne Park, Blenheim
Referee: Brendon Pickerill

10 September 2017
16:35 NZST

Hawke's Bay	21–64	Otago
Try: Jonah Lowe 29'; Marino Mikaele-Tu'u 54'; Ellery Wilson 72'; Con: Daniel Snee (3/3) 30', 55', 73'	Report	Try: Joshua Furno (2) 8', 43'; Dillon Hunt 11'; Sio Tomkinson 19'; Fletcher Smith (3) 25', 62', 80'; Sekonaia Pole 58'; Aki Seiuli 70'; Con: Fletcher Smith (8/9) 9', 12', 20', 26', 44', 59', 63', 80'; Pen: Fletcher Smith (1/1) 15'

McLean Park, Napier
Referee: Shane McDermott

=== Week 5 ===
13 September 2017
19:35 NZST

RS – Canterbury	78–5	Counties Manukau
Try: Mitchell Drummond (4) 4', 9', 31', 38'; Braydon Ennor 19'; Tim Bateman (3) 25', 44', 64'; Rob Thompson 57'; Poasa Waqanibau 61'; Josh McKay 75'; Con: Richie Mo'unga (10/11) 5', 10', 26', 32', 39', 45', 58', 62', 65', 76'; Pen: Richie Mo'unga (1/1) 2'	Report	Try: Nigel Ah Wong 47'; Con: Luteru Laulala (0/1)

Rugby League Park, Christchurch
Referee: Brendon Pickerill

14 September 2017
19:35 NZST

Northland	22–31	North Harbour
Try: Jordan Hyland 58'; Con: Peter Breen (1/1) 59'; Pen: Daniel Hawkins (3/3) 21', 28', 34'; Peter Breen (2/2) 71', 73'	Report	Try: Tevita Li 66'; Ben Volavola 75'; Matt Vaega 78'; Con: Bryn Gatland (2/3) 76', 79'; Pen: Bryn Gatland (4/4) 11', 31', 36', 61'

Okara Park, Whangārei
Referee: Michael Winter

15 September 2017
17:45 NZST

Southland	17–27	Auckland
Try: Brayden Mitchell 3'; Liam Howley 34'; Con: Scott Eade (2/2) 4', 35'; Pen: Scott Eade (1/1) 65'	Report	Try: Jerome Kaino 25'; Vince Aso 30'; Greg Pleasants-Tate 46'; Taleni Seu 68'; Con: Jono Hickey (2/3) 26', 47'; Jordan Trainor (0/1); Pen: Jono Hickey (1/1) 39'

Rugby Park Stadium, Invercargill
Referee: James Munro

15 September 2017
19:45 NZST

Taranaki	29–7	Bay of Plenty
Try: Declan O'Donnell 37'; Mitchell Graham 43'; Manasa Mataele 74'; Sione Lea 78'; Con: Marty McKenzie (3/4) 44', 75', 79'; Pen: Marty McKenzie (1/2) 28'; Cards: Lachlan Boshier (yellow card) 77'	Report	Try: Elijah Nicholas 80'; Con: Mike Delany (1/1) 80'; Pen: Kelly Haimona (0/1); Cards: Henry Stowers (yellow card) 34'

Yarrow Stadium, New Plymouth
Referee: Jamie Nutbrown

16 September 2017
14:35 NZST

Waikato	10–23	Manawatu
Try: Pita Ahki 4'; Samisoni Taukei'aho 43'; Con: Sam Christie (0/2)	Report	Try: Jamie Booth 57'; Harrison Brewer 64'; Con: Jade Te Rure (2/2) 58', 65'; Pen: Jade Te Rure (3/3) 38', 68', 72'

Waikato Stadium, Hamilton
Referee: Nick Briant

16 September 2017
16:35 NZST

Otago	27–29	Tasman
Try: Teihorangi Walden 16'; Sio Tomkinson 69'; Sione Teu 75'; Con: Fletcher Smith (3/3) 17', 70', 76'; Pen: Fletcher Smith (2/2) 9', 27'; Cards: Josh Ioane (yellow card) 47'	Report	Try: Will Jordan 11'; James Lowe 14'; Levi Aumua 30'; Penalty try 46'; Con: Mitchell Hunt (2/3) 12', 31'; Pen: Mitchell Hunt (1/1) 4'; Drop: Alex Ainley (yellow card) 53'; Levi Aumua (red card) 55'

Forsyth Barr Stadium, Dunedin
Referee: Mike Fraser

17 September 2017
14:35 NZST

Counties Manukau	33–14	Hawke's Bay
Try: Tim Nanai-Williams (2) 20', 60'; Fotu Lokotui 42'; Jonathan Kawau 52'; Kalolo Tuiloma 76'; Con: Baden Kerr (3/4) 21', 43', 61'; Luteru Laulala (1/1) 77'	Report	Try: Ash Dixon 25'; Pasqualle Dunn 78'; Con: Ihaia West (2/2) 26', 79'

ECOLight Stadium, Pukekohe
Referee: Michael Lash

17 September 2017
16:35 NZST

Wellington	60–14	Canterbury
Try: Julian Savea 6'; Asafo Aumua 10'; Isaia Walker-Leawere 40'; Du'Plessis Kirifi 48'; Malo Tuitama (2) 66', 73'; Ben Lam 68'; Regan Verney 78'; Con: Jackson Garden-Bachop (7/8) 7', 11', 42', 49', 67', 69', 74'; Pen: Jackson Garden-Bachop (2/2) 35', 58'	Report	Try: Josh McKay 19'; George Bridge 55'; Con: Richie Mo'unga (2/2) 20', 56'

Wellington Regional Stadium, Wellington
Attendance: 2,948
Referee: Richard Kelly

=== Week 6 ===
20 September 2017
19:35 NZST

Bay of Plenty	57–0	Southland
Try: Penalty try 7'; Hugh Blake 15'; Monty Ioane (2) 21', 61'; Richard Judd 31'; Lalakai Foketi (2) 53', 78'; Terrence Hepetema 67'; Jesse Parete 71'; Con: Mike Delany (3/5) 16', 54', 62'; Luke Campbell (2/3) 62', 72', 79'	Report	Pen: Scott Eade (0/1); Cards: Elliot Dixon (yellow card) 7' (red card) 44'

Rotorua International Stadium, Rotorua
Referee: Paul Williams

21 September 2017
19:35 NZST

Otago	34–26	Auckland
Try: Sio Tomkinson (2) 2', 78'; Jona Nareki (2) 15', 50'; Joshua Furno 37'; Con: Fletcher Smith (3/5) 3', 15', 38'; Pen: Fletcher Smith (1/1) 8'	Report	Try: George Moala (2) 13', 76'; Vince Aso 31'; Penalty try 80'; Con: Jono Hickey (2/2) 13', 32'; Lisati Milo-Harris (0/1)

Forsyth Barr Stadium, Dunedin
Referee: Glen Jackson

22 September 2017
19:35 NZST

Manawatu	39–25	Northland
Try: Newton Tudreu (2) 32', 68'; Ambrose Curtis 45'; Hamish Northcott 72'; Con: Jade Te Rure (2/3) 33', 46'; Otere Black (0/1); Pen: Jade Te Rure (5/5) 17', 40', 56', 67', 76'	Report	Try: Dan Pryor 23'; Jack Ram (2) 51', 62'; Con: Daniel Hawkins (2/3) 52', 63'; Pen: Daniel Hawkins (2/2) 19', 54'

Arena Manawatu, Palmerston North
Referee: Ben O'Keeffe

23 September 2017
14:35 NZST

North Harbour	28–41	Canterbury
Try: Matt Duffie 3'; Gerard Cowley-Tuioti 14'; Harrison Groundwater 32'; Shaun Stevenson 72'; Con: Bryn Gatland (4/4) 4', 15', 33', 73'	Report	Try: Richie Mo'unga 11'; Tim Bateman 43'; Mitchell Drummond (2) 45', 67'; Josh McKay 58'; Con: Richie Mo'unga (5/5) 12', 43', 46', 59', 68'; Pen: Richie Mo'unga (2/2) 30', 80'

North Harbour Stadium, Albany
Referee: Angus Mabey

23 September 2017
17:05 NZST

Waikato	10–34	Wellington
Try: Bailyn Sullivan 38'; Con: Sevu Reece (1/1) 39'; Pen: Sevu Reece (1/1) 20'	Report	Try: Sam Lousi 35'; Daniel Kirkpatrick 46'; Mateaki Kafatolu 61'; Thomas Umaga-Jensen 64'; Alex Fidow 68'; Con: Daniel Kirkpatrick (1/2) 36'; Jackson Garden-Bachop (2/3) 42', 69'; Pen: Daniel Kirkpatrick (1/1) 3'; Cards: Asafo Aumua (yellow card) 10'; Regan Verney (yellow card) 55'

Waikato Stadium, Hamilton
Referee: Cameron Stone

23 September 2017
19:35 NZST

Hawke's Bay	17–48	Taranaki
Try: Cardiff Vaega 35'; Ihaia West 37'; Jarvy Aoake 62'; Con: Daniel Snee (1/1) 63'; Ihaia West (0/2); Cards: Pouri Rakete-Stones (yellow card) 22'	Report	Try: Toa Halafihi 24'; Marty McKenzie 27'; Ricky Riccitelli 47'; Penalty try 55'; Pita Gus Sowakula 58'; Sean Wainui 68'; Adrian Wyrill 80'; Con: Marty McKenzie (3/5) 25', 28', 69'; Ciarahn Matoe (1/1) 80'; Pen: Marty McKenzie (1/1) 44'

McLean Park, Napier
Referee: Shane McDermott

24 September 2017
14:35 NZST

Bay of Plenty	31–31	Counties Manukau
Try: Solomona Sakalia 11'; Terrence Hepetema 24'; Lalakai Foketi 54'; Jesse Parete 65'; Con: Mike Delany (4/4) 12', 25', 55', 66'; Pen: Mike Delany (1/3) 39'	Report	Try: Fotu Lokotui 27'; Augustine Pulu 34'; Albert Nikoro 43'; Nigel Ah Wong 48'; Liam Daniela 76'; Con: Baden Kerr (2/4) 28', 35'; Luteru Laulala (1/1) 77'

Tauranga Domain, Tauranga
Referee: Michael Lash

24 September 2017
16:35 NZST

Tasman	50–17	Southland
Try: Pete Samu 1'; Viliami Lolohea (2) 3', 25'; James Lowe 12'; Ethan Blackadder 38'; Jordan Taufua 63'; Alex Nankivell 70'; Mitchell Hunt 80'; Con: Tim O'Malley (4/5) 2', 4', 13', 26'; Mitchell Hunt (1/3) 71'	Report	Try: Michael Molloy 15'; Aleki Morris-Lome 52'; Elliot Dixon 58'; Con: Scott Eade (1/3) 59'

Trafalgar Park, Nelson
Referee: James Doleman

=== Week 7 ===
27 September 2017
19:35 NZST

Northland	32–30	Otago
Try: Solomon Alaimalo 28'; Jone Macilai-Tori 43'; Con: Peter Breen (2/2) 29', 44'; Pen: Peter Breen (6/6) 8', 27', 34', 40', 51', 76'; Cards: Kara Pryor (yellow card) 69'	Report	Try: Fletcher Smith 49'; Vilimoni Koroi 62'; Jona Nareki 80'; Con: Fletcher Smith (3/3) 50', 63', 80'; Pen: Fletcher Smith (3/3) 12', 39', 71'; Cards: James Lentjes (yellow card) 31'; Slade McDowall (yellow card) 50'

Okara Park, Whangārei
Referee: Nick Briant

28 September 2017
19:35 NZST

Taranaki	40–26	Tasman
Try: Sean Wainui (2) 5', 56'; Johnny Fa'auli 17'; Lachlan Boshier 28'; Pita Gus Sowakula 32'; Toa Halafihi 43'; Con: Marty McKenzie (5/6) 6', 18', 29', 33', 57'	Report	Try: Andrew Makalio 10'; Alex Nankivell 40'; Alex Ainley 46'; Mitchell Hunt 73'; Con: Billy Guyton (2/3) 40', 46'; Tim O'Malley (1/1) 74'; Cards: Viliami Lolohea (yellow card) 4' (red card) 25'; Will Jordan (yellow card) 52'

Yarrow Stadium, New Plymouth
Referee: Angus Mabey

29 September 2017
19:35 NZST

North Harbour	33–30	Hawke's Bay
Try: Penalty try 18'; Shaun Stevenson 43'; Matt Duffie 62'; Con: Bryn Gatland (2/2) 44', 63'; Pen: Bryn Gatland (4/4) 5', 23', 72', 78'; Cards: Hapakuki Moala-Liava'a (yellow card) 60'	Report	Try: Ash Dixon 8'; Cardiff Vaega 26'; Jason Long 55'; Con: Ihaia West (3/3) 9', 27', 56'; Pen: Ihaia West (3/3) 20', 61', 75'

North Harbour Stadium, Albany
Referee: Richard Kelly

30 September 2017
14:35 NZST

Southland	20–25	Manawatu
Try: Manaaki Selby-Rickit 27'; Bill Fukofuka 62'; Con: Scott Eade (2/2) 28', 63'; Pen: Scott Eade (2/3) 44', 70'	Report	Try: Tom Crozier 1'; Newton Tudreu 3'; Kayne Hammington 55'; Jason Emery 73'; Con: Otere Black (1/2) 56'; Jade Te Rure (0/2); Pen: Jade Te Rure (1/1) 46'

Rugby Park Stadium, Invercargill
Referee: Shane McDermott

30 September 2017
17:05 NZST

Auckland	38–19	Bay of Plenty
Try: Joseva Ravouvou (2) 6', 10'; Vince Aso 43'; Melani Nanai 53'; Con: Jono Hickey (2/3) 7', 11'; Tyrone Elkington-MacDonald (1/1) 44'; Pen: Jono Hickey (4/4) 2', 26', 39', 63'; Cards: Marcel Renata (yellow card) 18'	Report	Try: Henry Stowers 68'; Tom Franklin 72'; Jesse Parete 78'; Con: Luke Campbell (2/3) 69', 73'

Eden Park, Auckland
Attendance: 2,600
Referee: Cameron Stone

30 September 2017
19:35 NZST

RS – Canterbury	37–17	Waikato
Try: Braydon Ennor 21'; Rob Thompson 32'; Josh McKay 35'; Tom Sanders 45'; Con: Richie Mo'unga (4/4) 22', 33', 36', 46'; Pen: Richie Mo'unga (3/3) 6', 28', 30'	Report	Try: Pita Ahki 38'; Sevu Reece (2) 56', 79'; Con: Sevu Reece (1/2) 79'; Matthew Lansdown (0/1); Pen: Sevu Reece (0/1)

Rugby League Park, Christchurch
Referee: Glen Jackson

1 October 2017
14:35 NZST

Wellington	27–24	Otago
Try: Alex Fidow 5'; Ben Lam (2) 27', 51'; Julian Savea 54'; Con: Jackson Garden-Bachop (2/4) 52', 55'; Pen: Jackson Garden-Bachop (1/1) 76'; Cards: Billy Proctor (yellow card) 66'	Report	Try: Jonathan Ruru 33'; Vilimoni Koroi 67'; Con: Fletcher Smith (1/2) 68'; Pen: Fletcher Smith (4/4) 2', 13', 44', 47'

Wellington Regional Stadium, Wellington
Attendance: 3,830
Referee: Jamie Nutbrown

1 October 2017
16:35 NZST

Counties Manukau	25–16	Northland
Try: Albert Nikoro 2'; Tim Nanai-Williams 33'; Stephen Donald 66'; Con: Baden Kerr (1/2) 34'; Luteru Laulala (1/1) 67'; Pen: Baden Kerr (1/1) 51'; Luteru Laulala (1/1) 76'	Report	Try: Blake Hohaia 48'; Con: Peter Breen (1/1) 49'; Pen: Peter Breen (3/3) 6', 40', 55'

ECOLight Stadium, Pukekohe
Referee: Mike Fraser

=== Week 8 ===
4 October 2017
19:35 NZST

Tasman	21–14	North Harbour
Try: Penalty try 5'; Will Jordan 14'; Shannon Frizell 18'; Con: Billy Guyton (2/2) 15', 19'; Pen: Tim O'Malley (0/1); Cards: Trael Joass (yellow card) 23'	Report	Try: Matt Duffie 41'; Matt Vaega 72'; Con: Ben Volavola (1/1) 42'; Bryn Gatland (1/1) 73'

Lansdowne Park, Blenheim
Referee: Jamie Nutbrown

5 October 2017
19:35 NZST

Manawatu	24–29	Counties Manukau
Try: Michael Alaalatoa 9'; Newton Tudreu 35'; Ambrose Curtis 50'; Con: Otere Black (3/3) 10', 36', 51'; Pen: Otere Black (1/2) 17'; Cards: Antonio Kiri Kiri (yellow card) 19'	Report	Try: Ronald Raaymakers 21'; Stephen Donald 25'; Orbyn Leger 39'; Nigel Ah Wong 62'; Con: Stephen Donald (3/4) 26', 40', 63'; Pen: Stephen Donald (1/2) 13'; Cards: Tim Nanai-Williams (yellow card) 8'; Tevita Nabura (yellow card) 52'; Augustine Pulu (red card) 75'

Arena Manawatu, Palmerston North
Referee: Glen Jackson

6 October 2017
19:35 NZST

Canterbury	43–55	Taranaki – RS
Try: Rob Thompson (2) 9', 78'; Tom Sanders 11'; Tim Bateman 20'; George Bridge 27'; Braydon Ennor 45'; Con: Richie Mo'unga (5/6) 10', 12', 21', 28', 46'; Pen: Richie Mo'unga (1/1) 16'	Report	Try: Seta Tamanivalu 22'; Stephen Perofeta 34'; Pita Gus Sowakula 37'; Ricky Riccitelli 50'; Lachlan Boshier (2) 53', 68'; Manasa Mataele 71'; Con: Marty McKenzie (7/7) 23', 35', 38', 51', 54', 69', 72'; Pen: Marty McKenzie (1/1) 57'; Drop: Stephen Perofeta (1/1) 76'

Rugby League Park, Christchurch
Referee: Mike Fraser

7 October 2017
14:35 NZST

Otago	28–36	Bay of Plenty
Try: Fletcher Smith 7'; Jona Nareki 26'; Matt Faddes 74'; Con: Fletcher Smith (1/2) 8'; Josh Ioane (1/1) 75'; Pen: Fletcher Smith (1/1) 33'; Josh Ioane (2/2) 52', 67'	Report	Try: Hugh Blake 10'; Terrence Hepetema 18'; Joe Webber 64'; Chase Tiatia 69'; Luke Campbell 78'; Con: Mike Delany (1/5) 79'; Pen: Mike Delany (3/3) 16', 49', 54'

Forsyth Barr Stadium, Dunedin
Referee: Ben O'Keeffe

7 October 2017
17:05 NZST

Northland	34–7	Hawke's Bay
Try: Dan Pryor (2) 4', 37'; Rene Ranger 54'; Tim Bond 79'; Con: Peter Breen (2/2) 5', 38'; Daniel Hawkins (2/2) 55', 80'; Pen: Peter Breen (1/3) 27'; Daniel Hawkins (1/1) 65'; Cards: Sam Nock (yellow card) 14'	Report	Try: Cardiff Vaega 16'; Con: Ihaia West (1/1) 17'

Okara Park, Whangārei
Referee: Paul Williams

7 October 2017
19:35 NZST

Southland	12–61	Wellington
Try: Tim Boys 62'; Michael McKee 80'; Con: Greg Dyer (1/2) 80'; Cards: Ryan Tongia (yellow card) 68'	Report	Try: Trent Renata 15'; William Mangos 19'; Jackson Garden-Bachop 24'; Asafo Aumua 36'; Thomas Umaga-Jensen 38'; Wes Goosen 47'; Regan Verney 68'; Sitiveni Paongo 68'; Kemara Hauiti-Parapara 71'; Con: Jackson Garden-Bachop (5/5) 16', 20', 25', 37', 39'; Trent Renata (3/4) 48', 69', 72'

Rugby Park Stadium, Invercargill
Referee: Michael Lash

8 October 2017
14:35 NZST

Tasman	31–18	Auckland
Try: Vernon Fredericks 16'; Billy Guyton 26'; Ethan Blackadder 33'; Will Jordan 47'; Shannon Frizell 62'; Con: Billy Guyton (3/5) 27', 34', 48'	Report	Try: Taleni Seu 55'; Ben Nee-Nee 78'; Con: Harry Plummer (1/1) 79'; Jono Hickey (0/1); Pen: Jono Hickey (2/2) 3', 8'

Trafalgar Park, Nelson
Referee: Brendon Pickerill

8 October 2017
16:35 NZST

Waikato	11–13	North Harbour
Try: Matthew Lansdown 60'; Con: Matthew Lansdown (0/1); Pen: Matthew Lansdown (2/3) 24', 30'; Sevu Reece (0/1); Cards: Sevu Reece (yellow card) 61'; James Tucker (yellow card) 65'	Report	Try: Matt Duffie 66'; Con: Ben Volavola (1/1) 67'; Pen: Bryn Gatland (1/2) 13'; Ben Volavola (1/3) 80'

Waikato Stadium, Hamilton
Referee: Shane McDermott

=== Week 9 ===
11 October 2017
19:35 NZST

RS – Taranaki	46–25	Manawatu
Try: Waisake Naholo (2) 21', 40'; Seta Tamanivalu (2) 32', 36'; Charlie Ngatai 56'; Kylem O'Donnell 75'; Adrian Wyrill 78'; Con: Marty McKenzie (4/7) 37', 40', 57', 79'; Pen: Marty McKenzie (1/1) 12'; Cards: Declan O'Donnell (yellow card) 70'	Report	Try: Jamie Booth 51'; Ambrose Curtis 60'; Jade Te Rure 73'; Con: Jade Te Rure (2/3) 61', 74'; Pen: Otere Black (2/2) 16', 25'; Cards: Michael Alaalatoa (yellow card) 29'

Yarrow Stadium, New Plymouth
Referee: Ben O'Keeffe

12 October 2017
19:35 NZST

Wellington	36–18	Northland
Try: Thomas Umaga-Jensen 24'; Jackson Garden-Bachop 29'; Asafo Aumua (2) 48', 76'; Alex Fidow 60'; Julian Savea 68'; Con: Jackson Garden-Bachop (3/6) 30', 49', 61'	Report	Try: Jordan Hyland 17'; Jack Goodhue 74'; Con: Daniel Hawkins (1/1) 18'; Peter Breen (0/1); Pen: Daniel Hawkins (2/2) 36', 46'

Wellington Regional Stadium, Wellington
Attendance: 2,589
Referee: Richard Kelly

13 October 2017
19:35 NZST

Auckland	27–32	Canterbury
Try: Vince Aso 11'; Joseva Ravouvou 53'; TJ Faiane 74'; Con: Jono Hickey (2/2) 12', 54'; Harry Plummer (1/1) 75'; Pen: Jono Hickey (2/2) 35', 40'; Cards: Ben Nee-Nee (yellow card) 21'	Report	Try: Braydon Ennor 8'; Caleb Makene 23'; Jack Stratton (2) 50', 61'; Con: Richie Mo'unga (3/4) 9', 51', 62'; Pen: Richie Mo'unga (2/2) 57', 73'; Cards: Inga Finau (yellow card) 68'

Eden Park, Auckland
Attendance: 4,000
Referee: Brendon Pickerill

14 October 2017
14:35 NZST

Bay of Plenty	36–32	Waikato
Try: Chase Tiatia 11'; Lalakai Foketi (2) 22', 62'; Terrence Hepetema 34'; Luke Campbell 69'; Con: Mike Delany (4/5) 23', 35', 63', 70'; Pen: Mike Delany (1/1) 67'; Cards: Lalakai Foketi (yellow card) 40'	Report	Try: Atunaisa Moli 15'; Sevu Reece 40'; Pita Ahki 42'; Laghlan McWhannell 72'; Loni Uhila 78'; Con: Sevu Reece (1/1) 40'; Pita Ahki (1/1) 43'; Sam Christie (0/3); Pen: Pita Ahki (1/1) 46'; Sam Christie (0/1); Cards: Pita Ahki (yellow card) 57'

Tauranga Domain, Tauranga
Referee: James Doleman

14 October 2017
17:05 NZST

Otago	43–19	Southland
Try: Mitchell Scott 16'; Sio Tomkinson 35'; Jona Nareki 40'; Teihorangi Walden 48'; Latu Vaeno 57'; Jonah Aiona 71'; Con: Josh Ioane (5/6) 17', 36', 49', 58', 72'; Pen: Josh Ioane (1/1) 28'	Report	Try: Lewis Ormond (2) 33', 51'; James Schrader 67'; Con: Scott Eade (1/2) 52'; Greg Dyer (1/1) 68'; Cards: Phil Halder (yellow card) 55'

Forsyth Barr Stadium, Dunedin
Referee: Angus Mabey

14 October 2017
19:35 NZST

Counties Manukau	52–30	Tasman
Try: Joe Royal 12'; Nigel Ah Wong (2) 18', 40'; Orbyn Leger 47'; Penalty try 62'; Tim Nanai-Williams 70'; Sam Henwood 74'; Baden Kerr 79'; Con: Stephen Donald (2/4) 13', 40'; Luteru Laulala (2/2) 71', 75'; Jimmy Tupou (1/1) 80'; Cards: Baden Kerr (yellow card) 65'; Albert Nikoro (red card) 65'	Report	Try: Tim O'Malley 2'; Ethan Blackadder 7'; Levi Aumua 29'; Alex Nankivell 42'; Con: Tim O'Malley (2/4) 3', 8'; Pen: Tim O'Malley (2/2) 24', 56'; Cards: Sam Moli (yellow card) 63'

ECOLight Stadium, Pukekohe
Referee: Paul Williams

15 October 2017
14:35 NZST

North Harbour	64–33	Taranaki
Try: Bryn Hall 6'; Tevita Li (2) 11', 24', 32', 60', 79'; Shaun Stevenson 20'; Matt Duffie 49'; James Parsons 66'; Matt Vaega 73'; Con: Ben Volavola (5/7) 12', 21', 25', 33', 61'; Todd Doolan (2/3) 74', 80'; Pen: Ben Volavola (0/1)	Report	Try: Declan O'Donnell 26'; Jared Proffit 35'; Ciarahn Matoe (2) 38', 71'; Adrian Wyrill 59'; Con: Ciarahn Matoe (4/5) 27', 36', 60', 72'

North Harbour Stadium, Albany
Referee: Shane McDermott

15 October 2017
16:35 NZST

Hawke's Bay	36–31	Manawatu
Try: Gareth Evans 44'; Brad Weber 47'; Mason Emerson (2) 50', 66'; Richard Buckman 52'; Jonah Lowe 56'; Con: Ihaia West (3/6) 45', 48', 57'; Cards: Tony Lamborn (red card) 34'	Report	Try: Lewis Marshall 16'; Timothy Cadwallader 37'; Jason Emery 70'; Jade Te Rure 79'; Con: Jade Te Rure (3/3) 17', 38', 79'; Jason Emery (1/1) 70'; Pen: Jade Te Rure (1/1) 20'; Cards: Newton Tudreu (red card) 34'

McLean Park, Napier
Referee: Cameron Stone

== Play-offs ==
Championship

Semi-finals
1	Wellington	49
4	Northland	21
2	Bay of Plenty	48
3	Otago	32

Final
1	Wellington	59
2	Bay of Plenty	45

Premiership

Semi-finals
2	Canterbury	35
3	North Harbour	24
1	Taranaki	29
4	Tasman	30

Final
2	Canterbury	35
4	Tasman	13

=== Semi-finals ===
==== Championship ====
20 October 2017
19:35 NZST

Wellington	49–21	Northland
Try: Umaga-Jensen 37' c Goosen (2) 42' c, 79' c Renata 48' c Fahamokioa 58' m Verney 66' c Con: Garden-Bachop (5/6) 38', 44', 49', 67', 80'; Pen: Garden-Bachop (3/3) 4', 9', 27'	Report	Try: Hyland 10' c Alaimalo 16' c Nock 73' c Con: Hawkins (2/2) 11', 17'; Nock (1/1) 74'; Cards: Pryor (yellow card) 34'

Wellington Regional Stadium, Wellington
Attendance: 4,952
Referee: Glen Jackson

21 October 2017
14:35 NZST

Bay of Plenty	48–32	Otago
Try: Webber (2) 16' m, 49' c Foketi (2) 24' c, 39' c Stowers 59' m Hepetema 70' c Penalty try 81' m Con: Delany (4/6) 25', 40', 50', 71'; Pen: Delany (1/1) 11'; Cards: Blake (yellow card) 45'	Report	Try: Anderson-Heather 28' m Teu 46' c Koroi 63' c Walden 76' c Con: Smith (3/4) 47', 64', 77'; Pen: Ioane (2/2) 2', 35'; Cards: Vaeno (yellow card) 80'

Tauranga Domain, Tauranga
Referee: Brendon Pickerill

==== Premiership ====
21 October 2017
17:05 NZST

Canterbury	35–24	North Harbour
Try: Drummond 18' c Bridge 28' c Harmon 43' m Bateman 74' c Con: Cameron (3/4) 19', 29', 75'; Pen: Cameron (3/4) 27', 66', 79'	Report	Try: Volavola 10' c Eves 41' c Taramai 68' c Con: Volavola (3/3) 11', 42', 69'; Pen: Volavola (1/1) 6'

Rugby League Park, Christchurch
Referee: Ben O'Keeffe

21 October 2017
19:35 NZST

Taranaki	29–30	Tasman
Try: O'Donnell 25' c Ngatai 33' c Tahuriorangi 52' c Tamanivalu 55' m Con: McKenzie (3/4) 26', 34', 53'; Pen: McKenzie (1/2) 13'; Cards: Tamanivalu (yellow card) 73'	Report	Try: Fainga'anuku 28' m Hunt 43' c Con: Hunt (1/2) 44'; Pen: Hunt (6/8) 4', 10', 16', 36', 47', 64'

Yarrow Stadium, New Plymouth
Referee: Nick Briant

=== Finals ===
==== Championship ====
27 October 2017
19:35 NZST

Wellington	59–45 (a.e.t)	Bay of Plenty
Try: Umaga-Jensen 13' m Lousi 32' c Fahamokioa (2) 36' m, 58' m Shields 41' m Fidow 72' c Goosen 84' c Paongo 86' m Savea 93' c Con: Garden-Bachop (4/9) 33', 73', 85', 94'; Pen: Garden-Bachop (2/3) 27', 46'	Report	Try: Campbell 3' c Webber (2) 22' c, 52' c Ardron 48' c Parete 61' m Hepetema 77' c Karpik 100' m Con: Delany (5/6) 4', 23', 49', 53', 78'; Tiatia (0/1)

Wellington Regional Stadium, Wellington
Attendance: 7,908
Referee: Paul Williams

==== Premiership ====
28 October 2017
19:35 NZST

Canterbury	35–13	Tasman
Try: Mo'unga (2) 19' m, 25' c Bateman 39' c Stratton 74' c Con: Mo'unga (3/4) 26', 40', 75'; Pen: Mo'unga (3/4) 42', 55', 64'	Report	Try: Aumua 7' c Con: Hunt (1/1) 8'; Pen: Hunt (1/1) 14'

Rugby League Park, Christchurch
Attendance: 9,500
Referee: Mike Fraser

FB	15	George Bridge	(substituted off) 76'
RW	14	Josh McKay
OC	13	Tim Bateman
IC	12	Rob Thompson	(substituted off) 76'
LW	11	Braydon Ennor
FH	10	Richie Mo'unga
SH	9	Mitchell Drummond	(substituted off) 56'
N8	8	Luke Whitelock (c)
OF	7	Billy Harmon	(substituted off) 27'
BF	6	Tom Sanders	(substituted off) 76'
RL	5	Dominic Bird
LL	4	Hamish Dalzell
TP	3	Siate Tokolahi	(substituted off) 65'
HK	2	Ben Funnell	(substituted off) 65'
LP	1	Alex Hodgman	(substituted off) 76'
Replacements:
HK	16	Nathan Vella	(substituted on) 65'
PR	17	Chris Gawler	(substituted on) 76'
PR	18	Oliver Jager	(substituted on) 65'
LK	19	Reed Prinsep	(substituted on) 27'
FL	20	Tom Christie	(substituted on) 76'
SH	21	Jack Stratton	(substituted on) 56'
FH	22	Brett Cameron	(substituted on) 76'
WG	23	Inga Finau	(substituted on) 76'

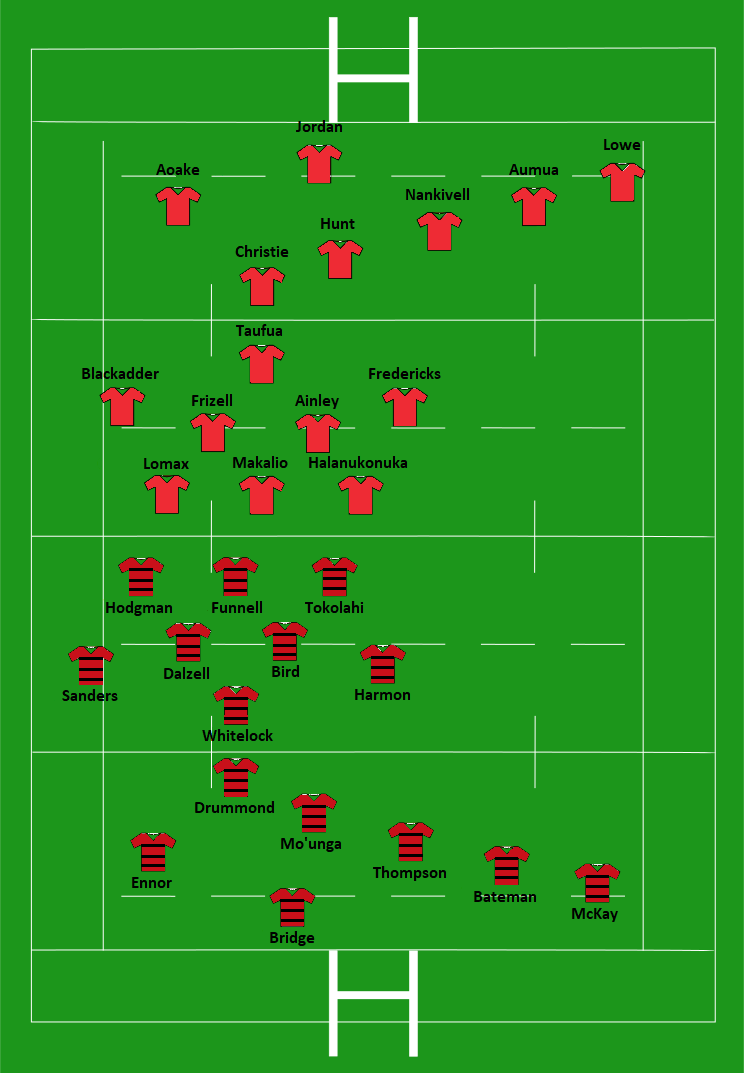

FB	15	Will Jordan
RW	14	Tomas Aoake	(substituted off) 66'
OC	13	Levi Aumua	(substituted off) 77'
IC	12	Alex Nankivell
LW	11	James Lowe
FH	10	Mitchell Hunt
SH	9	Finlay Christie	(substituted off) 65'
N8	8	Jordan Taufua	(substituted off) 41'
OF	7	Vernon Fredericks
BF	6	Ethan Blackadder
RL	5	Shannon Frizell
LL	4	Alex Ainley (c)	(substituted off) 48'
TP	3	Tyrel Lomax		(substituted off) 65'
HK	2	Andrew Makalio	(substituted off) 65'
LP	1	Siua Halanukonuka	(substituted off) 34'	(substituted on) 65'
Replacements:
HK	16	Ti'i Paulo	(substituted on) 65'
PR	17	Tom Hill	(substituted on) 34'	(substituted off) 41'
PR	18	Ryan Coxon		(substituted on) 41'
LK	19	Pari Pari Parkinson	(substituted on) 48'
FL	20	Pete Samu	(substituted on) 41'
SH	21	Billy Guyton	(substituted on) 65'
FH	22	Tim O'Malley	(substituted on) 77'
CE	23	Trael Joass	(substituted on) 66'

== Statistics ==
=== Leading point scorers ===
No.	Player	Team	Points	Average	Details
1	Richie Mo'unga	Canterbury	160	16.00	5 T, 42 C, 17 P, 0 D
2	Jackson Garden-Bachop	Wellington	142	12.90	3 T, 47 C, 11 P, 0 D
3	Fletcher Smith	Otago	116	10.54	5 T, 26 C, 13 P, 0 D
4	Marty McKenzie	Taranaki	100	11.11	1 T, 34 C, 9 P, 0 D
5	Bryn Gatland	North Harbour	96	10.67	0 T, 18 C, 20 P, 0 D
6	Mike Delany	Bay of Plenty	94	9.40	0 T, 29 C, 12 P, 0 D
7	Mitchell Hunt	Tasman	94	8.55	4 T, 16 C, 14 P, 0 D
8	Jono Hickey	Auckland	75	7.50	1 T, 14 C, 14 P, 0 D
9	Daniel Hawkins	Northland	66	7.33	0 T, 15 C, 12 P, 0 D
10	Jade Te Rure	Manawatu	66	6.60	3 T, 9 C, 11 P, 0 D

Source: The weekly reviews of the matches published on provincial.rugby (see "Report" in the individual match scoring stats).

=== Leading try scorers ===
No.	Player	Team	Tries	Average
1	Tevita Li	North Harbour	11	1.22
2	Braydon Ennor	Canterbury	10	1.11
3	Jona Nareki	Otago	9	1.00
4	Tim Bateman	Canterbury	9	0.81
5	Joe Webber	Bay of Plenty	8	0.73
6	Alex Fidow	Wellington	8	0.73
7	Lalakai Foketi	Bay of Plenty	8	0.67
8	Asafo Aumua	Wellington	7	0.70
9	Vince Aso	Auckland	7	0.70
10	George Bridge	Canterbury	7	0.58

Source: The weekly reviews of the matches published on provincial.rugby (see "Report" in the individual match scoring stats).

=== Points by week ===
Team	1		2		3		4		5		6		7		8		9		Total		Average	
Auckland	14	16	10	8	37	92	38	49	27	17	26	34	38	19	18	31	27	32	235	298	23.50	29.80
Bay of Plenty	23	28	46	17	10	31	20	17	7	29	88	31	19	38	36	28	36	32	285	251	28.50	25.10
Canterbury	39	0	30	24	53	10	78	20	92	65	41	28	37	17	43	55	32	27	445	246	44.50	24.60
Counties Manukau	16	14	21	33	27	30	18	27	38	92	31	31	25	16	29	24	52	30	257	297	25.70	29.70
Hawke's Bay	24	16	17	46	10	53	48	104	14	33	17	48	30	33	7	34	36	31	203	398	20.30	39.80
Manawatu	29	41	35	20	30	40	17	20	23	10	39	25	25	20	24	29	56	82	278	287	27.80	28.70
North Harbour	19	17	45	20	57	10	27	18	31	22	28	41	33	30	27	32	64	33	331	223	33.10	22.30
Northland	28	23	8	10	44	13	37	7	22	31	25	39	48	55	34	7	18	36	264	221	26.40	22.10
Otago	17	19	24	30	40	30	64	21	27	29	34	26	54	59	28	36	43	19	331	269	33.10	26.90
Southland	16	24	20	45	13	44	20	78	17	27	17	107	20	25	12	61	19	43	154	454	15.40	45.40
Taranaki	34	29	26	42	30	27	49	38	29	7	48	17	40	26	55	43	79	89	390	318	39.00	31.80
Tasman	0	39	20	35	31	29	37	35	29	27	50	17	26	40	52	32	30	52	275	306	27.50	30.60
Waikato	29	34	33	21	64	58	7	37	10	23	10	34	17	37	11	13	32	36	213	293	21.30	29.30
Wellington	41	29	42	26	31	10	75	64	60	14	34	10	27	24	61	12	36	18	407	207	40.70	20.70

Source: Mitre 10 Cup Fixtures and Results 2017

=== Tries by week ===
Team	1		2		3		4		5		6		7		8		9		Total		Average	
Auckland	2	1	1	1	4	11	5	6	4	2	4	5	4	3	2	5	3	4	29	38	2.90	3.80
Bay of Plenty	2	4	6	2	1	5	2	2	1	4	13	5	3	4	5	3	5	5	38	34	3.80	3.40
Canterbury	5	0	4	4	7	1	11	2	13	9	5	4	4	3	6	7	4	3	59	33	5.90	3.30
Counties Manukau	1	2	3	5	3	4	2	2	6	13	5	4	3	1	4	3	8	4	35	38	3.50	3.80
Hawke's Bay	3	1	2	6	1	7	7	15	2	5	3	7	3	3	1	4	6	4	28	52	2.80	5.20
Manawatu	5	6	4	2	3	6	2	2	2	2	4	3	4	2	3	4	7	13	34	40	3.40	4.00
North Harbour	1	2	6	2	7	1	2	2	3	1	4	5	3	3	3	4	10	5	39	25	3.90	2.50
Northland	4	2	1	1	6	1	5	1	1	3	3	4	3	6	4	1	2	6	29	25	2.90	2.50
Otago	2	1	4	4	6	3	9	3	3	4	5	4	5	6	3	5	6	3	43	33	4.30	3.30
Southland	1	3	2	6	1	6	2	11	2	4	3	17	2	4	2	9	3	6	18	66	1.80	6.60
Taranaki	6	4	4	5	4	3	6	5	4	1	7	3	6	4	7	6	12	13	56	44	5.60	4.49
Tasman	0	5	2	4	4	5	4	5	4	3	8	3	4	6	8	4	4	8	38	43	3.80	4.30
Waikato	4	6	5	3	9	7	1	5	2	2	1	5	3	4	1	1	5	5	31	38	3.10	3.80
Wellington	6	5	5	4	5	1	11	8	8	2	5	1	4	2	9	2	6	2	59	27	5.90	2.70

For	Against

Source: The weekly reviews of the matches published on provincial.rugby (see "Report" in the individual match scoring stats).

=== Sanctions ===
Player	Team	Red	Yellow	Sent off match(es)
Elliot Dixon	Southland	1	2	vs Bay of Plenty
Viliami Lolohea	Tasman	1	2	vs Taranaki
Levi Aumua	Tasman	1	0	vs Otago
Augustine Pulu	Counties Manukau	1	0	vs Manawatu
Albert Nikoro	Counties Manukau	1	0	vs Tasman
Tony Lamborn	Hawke's Bay	1	0	vs Manawatu
Newton Tudreu	Manawatu	1	0	vs Hawke's Bay
Sam Henwood	Counties Manukau	0	2	vs Auckland and Waikato
Pouri Rakete-Stones	Hawke's Bay	0	2	vs Bay of Plenty and Taranaki
Marcel Renata	Auckland	0	2	vs Waikato and Bay of Plenty
Ryan Tongia	Southland	0	2	vs Canterbury and Wellington
James Tucker	Waikato	0	2	vs Northland and North Harbour
Geoffrey Cridge	Hawke's Bay	0	1	vs Southland
Jordan Trainor	Auckland	0	1	vs Northland
Tima Fainga'anuku	Tasman	0	1	vs Manawatu
Jordan Taufua	Tasman	0	1	vs Manawatu
Nick Werahiko	Canterbury	0	1	vs Hawke's Bay
James Lowe	Tasman	0	1	vs Waikato
Heiden Bedwell-Curtis	Manawatu	0	1	vs Bay of Plenty
Henry Stowers	Bay of Plenty	0	1	vs Taranaki
Lachlan Boshier	Taranaki	0	1	vs Bay of Plenty
Josh Ioane	Otago	0	1	vs Tasman
Alex Ainley	Tasman	0	1	vs Otago
Asafo Aumua	Wellington	0	1	vs Waikato
Regan Verney	Wellington	0	1	vs Waikato
Kara Pryor	Northland	0	1	vs Otago
James Lentjes	Otago	0	1	vs Northland
Slade McDowall	Otago	0	1	vs Northland
Will Jordan	Tasman	0	1	vs Taranaki
Hapakuki Moala-Liava'a	North Harbour	0	1	vs Hawke's Bay
Billy Proctor	Wellington	0	1	vs Otago
Trael Joass	Tasman	0	1	vs North Harbour
Antonio Kiri Kiri	Manawatu	0	1	vs Counties Manukau
Tevita Nabura	Counties Manukau	0	1	vs Manawatu
Tim Nanai-Williams	Counties Manukau	0	1	vs Manawatu
Sam Nock	Northland	0	1	vs Hawke's Bay
Sevu Reece	Waikato	0	1	vs North Harbour
Michael Alaalatoa	Manawatu	0	1	vs Taranaki
Declan O'Donnell	Taranaki	0	1	vs Manawatu
Ben Nee-Nee	Auckland	0	1	vs Canterbury
Inga Finau	Canterbury	0	1	vs Auckland
Lalakai Foketi	Bay of Plenty	0	1	vs Waikato
Pita Ahki	Waikato	0	1	vs Bay of Plenty
Phil Halder	Southland	0	1	vs Otago
Baden Kerr	Counties Manukau	0	1	vs Tasman
Sam Moli	Tasman	0	1	vs Counties Manukau
Dan Pryor	Northland	0	1	vs Wellington
Hugh Blake	Bay of Plenty	0	1	vs Otago
Latu Vaeno	Otago	0	1	vs Bay of Plenty
Seta Tamanivalu	Taranaki	0	1	vs Tasman

== Ranfurly Shield ==
=== Pre-season challenges ===
In December 2016, Canterbury accepted Ranfurly Shield challenges from both Wanganui and Mid Canterbury after it was confirmed that several offers were received from Mitre 10 Cup and Heartland Championship unions. Wanganui travelled to Christchurch to play at AMI Stadium, while the Shield went on the road for a challenge against Mid-Canterbury at the Ashburton Showgrounds.

In the first challenge, Canterbury beat Wanganui 71−5 in Christchurch, after running in 10 tries with 10 uncapped players. Canterbury's win ensured them their 133rd successful Shield defence. Captain and halfback Jack Stratton scored the opening try in the 10th minute, before four more first-half tries resulted in the lead out to 36−5 at the break. Also early in the half, a yellow card was awarded to Wanganui prop Viki Tofa, for a high tackle on flanker Billy Harmon. Debutant first-five eighth Brett Cameron kicked 17 points in the match, while hooker Nick Werahiko scored a double. Wing Ngane Punivai impressed with his power and speed. Midfielder Timoci Seruwalu scored the visitors' only try late in the first half, when he powered over the line on the back of a close scrum. Wanganui veteran Peter Rowe retired after the loss with 112 games.

The late pre-season match saw the current holders take on Mid Canterbury, with the opposition losing all 13 of their Ranfurly Shield challenges, with eight of the defeats against Canterbury. Canterbury went on to win another successful defence 69–7. Having led 33–0 at halftime, the defending Mitre 10 Cup champions went on to run in eleven tries to one and beat the Heartland Championship side at the Ashburton Showgrounds. Former New Zealand under-20s World Cup winner Josh McKay was one of four Canterbury players to make their debut in the match, with himself and outside back Nigel Gibb, who beat four defenders on his way to the line, scoring tries in the blowout win. Wing Marshall Suckling and hooker Nathan Vella scored doubles in the win also.

21 June 2017
19:35 NZST

Canterbury	71–5	Wanganui
Try: Stratton 10' c Maitland 15' c Nel 25' c Werahiko (2) 28' c, 56' c Suckling 31' m Dunshea 47' c Waqanibau 66' c Alfeld 70' c Makene 75' c Con: Cameron (7/8) 11', 16', 26', 29', 48', 57', 66'; Hart-Strawbridge (2/2) 70', 76'; Pen: Cameron (1/2) 2'	Preview; Report	Try: Seruwalu 39' m Con: Whale (0/1); Drop: Clare (0/1); Cards: Tofa (yellow card) 40'

Rugby League Park, Christchurch
Attendance: 3,500
Referee: Richard Kelly

4 August 2017
14:35 NZST

Canterbury	69–7	Mid Canterbury
Try: Brown 4' c Sanders 11' c Cameron 18' c Suckling (2) 26' m, 40' c Vella (2) 44' c, 55' c McKay 52' c Gibb 58' m Waqanibau 61' m Dalzell 75' m Con: Cameron (4/5) 5', 12', 19', 40'; McKay (3/6) 45', 53', 56'	Preview; Report	Try: Sau 73' c Con: Kjestrup (1/1) 74'

Ashburton Showgrounds, Ashburton
Attendance: 3,000
Referee: James Doleman

== See also ==
- 2017 Heartland Championship
