= New Zealand Barbarians =

NZ invitational rugby union team

- Full name: New Zealand Barbarian Rugby Club Inc.
- Union: New Zealand Rugby
- Nickname: Baa-Baas
- Founded: 1937; 89 years ago
- Location: Kingsland, Auckland
- Ground: Eden Park (Capacity: 50,000)
- Coach: Scott McLeod
Team kit

Official website
- www.barbarianrugby.co.nz

The New Zealand Barbarians, officially New Zealand Barbarian Rugby Club Inc., nicknamed the Baa-Baas, is a rugby union club headquartered at Eden Park in Kingsland, Auckland. The idea came from the concept of the Barbarian F.C..

The team was founded in 1937 by two ex-All Blacks, Ronald Bush and Hubert McLean, who captained their first game, against Auckland in 1938.

== Tours ==
=== Jubilee Tour Party 1987 ===
To mark the club's 50th Jubilee, an unbeaten five-match tour to the United Kingdom and Ireland was undertaken in March 1987, two months before the inaugural World Cup, where they recorded wins against Leicester (33-3), Wanderers (Dublin) (34-3), Ballymena (29-4), Cornwall (63-9). They also produced a devastating performance in Cardiff, beating the Barbarians 68-16. There were thirteen All Blacks in the party of 22 and a further six future caps, with Wayne Smith being drafted in from Italy as a replacement for one game. New Zealand were emerging from a turbulent 1986, the year of the rebel Cavaliers tour to South Africa and the "Baby Blacks" tests, the subsequent reintegration of the Cavaliers into the Bledisloe Cup games, and the infamous Battle of Nantes. Eight players who had survived November in Nantes toured, as did four Cavaliers.

- Management staff was: Peter Murdoch (Coach), Kevin Barry (Team Manager), D.E.Kirk (Auckland) Captain, Clive Murdoch (Masseur)
- Back Threes: G.J.L. Cooper (Auckland), C.I.Green (Canterbury), C, D.J.Halligan (Waikato), J.J.Kirwan (Auckland)
- Centres: B.J. McCahill (Auckland), N.J.Schuster (Wellington), J.T.Stanley (Auckland)
- Half backs: S.J.Bachop (Otago), I.B.Deans (Canterbury), W.R. Smith (Canterbury)
- Front rows: J.A.S.Buchan (Canterbury), W.G.Bunn (Taranaki), B.T.Fitzpatrick (Auckland), S.C.McDowall (Auckland), B.McGrattan (Wellington)
- Locks: B.L.Anderson (Wairapa-Bush), M.Weedon (Bay of Plenty), G.W.Whetton (Auckland)
- Back rows: M.R.Brewer (Otago), M.N.Jones (Auckland), A.J.Whetton (Auckland), D.A.Williams (Wellington)

Subsequent NZ Barbarian trips to the UK were undertaken in 1996 and 2003.

=== 1996 tour ===
The November 1996 matches were part of the ERFU's 125th celebrations with a warm-up fixture against the North Of England played in the snow at Huddersfield ahead of a "test" against England the week after.John Hart's 24-man squad, captained by Sean Fitzpatrick featured 19 All Blacks and four future All Blacks and won both fixtures, an 86-0 win against the North of England for whom twelve first choice selections had withdrawn from the team on the preceding Wednesday and a 34-19 victory against England at Twickenham Stadium.

- Back three: J.T Lomu (Counties), C.M.Cullen (Manawatu), G.M. Osborne (North Harbour), J.Vidiri (Counties)
- Centres: N.A.Ieremia (Wellington)*, M.R.Ranby (Manawatu)F, L.Stensness (Auckland)*
- Half-backs: J.W.Marshall (Canterbury), A.P Mehrtens (Canterbury), C.J Spencer (Auckland), M.D. Robinson (North Harbour)
- Front Row: M.R. Allen (Taranaki), O.M.Brown (Auckland), M.Collins (Waikato), S.B.T. Fitzpatrick (Capt.) (Auckland)* A.D.Oliver (Otago)
- Locks: R.M. Brooke (Auckland), I.D. Jones (Auckland), G.L.Taylor (Northland)
- Back Row: A.F.Blowers (Auckland), C.S.Davis (Manawatu), M.N.Jones (Auckland), D.G.Mika (Auckland), T.C.Randell (Otago)

=== 2003 tour ===
The 2003 match played at Twickenham was viewed at the time as something of a festival affair to celebrate the home country's recent RWC success. Falling as it did during the British, Irish and European club championships, both sides struggled to assemble "full strength squads" indeed the England XV featured only five RUWC cup winners.Contractual difficulties with clubs releasing players resulted in the NZ Barbarians side being deemed - in comparison to previous touring parties - as at best only "competitive" and the England XV side ran out very comfortable winners, 42-17.

- Back three: G.P."Jorrie" Muller (Lions & South Africa), R.L Gear (North Harbour), E.Taione (Newcastle Falcons & Tonga), Diego Albanese (Leeds Tykes & Argentina)
- Centres: D.L Gibson (Leicester & NZ), K.R.Lowren (Waikato), T.A. Vili (Border Reivers & Samoa)
- Half backs: D.D. Lee (Otago), G.W. Jackson (Bay of Plenty), B.Willis (Harlequins)
- Front rows: A.K.Hore (Taranaki), M.R.Hurter (Newcastle Falcons & South Africa), D.T Manu (Waikato), S.A.A."Ace" Tiatia (Harlequins & Samoa), T.D.Woodcock (North Harbour)
- Locks: T.V.Flavell (North Harbour), T.S. Mailing (Otago), N.M.C. Maxwell (Canterbury)
- Back row: J.Blackie (Otago), S.Harding (Otago), T.C. Randell (Saracens & NZ) (Capt), X.J.Rush (Auckland)

The New Zealand Barbarians were also selected for the All Blacks trial replacing the 'Possibles XV' and in 2009 a New Zealand Barbarians under 85 kg Team toured Australia winning both of their games. The team played against the Māori All Blacks in 2010 at Okara Park, losing 31 – 37 before a crowd of 9,000. A Middleweight Barbarian side was also selected in 2011 to play four games. In 2015, the New Zealand Barbarians won over the Māori All Blacks 17–34.

=== Other squads ===
Provincial Barbarians squad to play the British and Irish Lions on 3 June 2017, during the 2017 British & Irish Lions tour to New Zealand:

- Head Coach – (New Zealand) Clayton McMillan

Note: Flags indicate national union under World Rugby eligibility rules.

| Player | Position | Date of birth (age) | Club/province | Union |
|---|---|---|---|---|
| Sam Anderson-Heather | Hooker | 15 February 1988 (age 37) | (New Zealand) Otago | New Zealand |
| Andrew Makalio | Hooker | 22 January 1992 (age 33) | (New Zealand) Tasman / Crusaders | New Zealand |
| Tolu Fahamokioa | Prop | 5 May 1991 (age 34) | (New Zealand) Wellington | Tonga |
| Oliver Jager | Prop | 5 June 1995 (age 30) | (New Zealand) Canterbury / Crusaders | Ireland |
| Marcel Renata | Prop | 24 January 1994 (age 31) | (New Zealand) Auckland | New Zealand |
| Aidan Ross | Prop | 25 October 1995 (age 30) | (New Zealand) Bay of Plenty | New Zealand |
| Josh Goodhue | Lock | 13 June 1995 (age 30) | (New Zealand) Northland / Blues | New Zealand |
| Keepa Mewett | Lock | 10 May 1987 (age 38) | (New Zealand) Bay of Plenty | New Zealand |
| James Tucker | Lock | 5 August 1991 (age 34) | (New Zealand) Waikato / Chiefs | New Zealand |
| Lachlan Boshier | Flanker | 16 November 1994 (age 31) | (New Zealand) Taranaki / Chiefs | New Zealand |
| Mitchell Dunshea | Flanker | 18 November 1995 (age 30) | (New Zealand) Canterbury / Crusaders | New Zealand |
| Matt Matich | Flanker | 10 July 1991 (age 34) | (New Zealand) Northland | New Zealand |
| Peter Rowe | Number 8 | 7 December 1981 (age 44) | (New Zealand) Wanganui | New Zealand |
| Jack Stratton | Scrum-half | 21 August 1994 (age 31) | (New Zealand) Canterbury | New Zealand |
| Richard Judd | Scrum-half | 18 May 1992 (age 33) | (New Zealand) Bay of Plenty | New Zealand |
| Bryn Gatland | Fly-half | 10 May 1995 (age 30) | (New Zealand) North Harbour | New Zealand |
| Dwayne Sweeney | Centre | 8 August 1984 (age 41) | (New Zealand) Waikato | New Zealand |
| Inga Finau | Centre | 21 August 1994 (age 31) | (New Zealand) Taranaki | New Zealand |
| Jonah Lowe | Wing | 9 May 1996 (age 29) | (New Zealand) Hawke's Bay | New Zealand |
| Sevu Reece | Wing | 13 February 1997 (age 28) | (New Zealand) Waikato | Fiji |
| Sam Vaka | Wing | 26 October 1992 (age 33) | (New Zealand) Counties Manukau | New Zealand |
| Luteru Laulala | Fullback | 30 May 1995 (age 30) | (New Zealand) Counties Manukau | New Zealand |
| Junior Ngaluafe | Fullback | 24 November 1991 (age 34) | (New Zealand) Southland | New Zealand |

== Representatives ==
- Kevin Boroevich
- Jonah Lomu
- Andrew Mehrtens
- Christian Cullen
- Ian Jones
- Mark Donaldson (1977)
- Sean Fitzpatrick
- Grant Fox
- John Kirwan
- Taine Randell
- Xavier Rush
- Wilson Whineray
- John Afoa
- Rene Ranger
- Colin Slade
- Alby Mathewson
- Rupeni Caucaunibuca
- Ben Smith

== Playing kit and symbol ==
The New Zealand Barbarians wear scarlet red jerseys with white shorts. The symbol of the team is a white leaping lamb.

== See also ==
- Australian Barbarians
- Fiji Barbarians
- French Barbarians
- South African Barbarians
- Brussels Barbarians
