= Laulala =

Laulala is a Samoan surname that may refer to the following Samoan-born New Zealand rugby union player brothers:

- Casey Laulala (born 1982)
- Luteru Laulala (born 1995)
- Nepo Laulala (born 1991)
