= Poasa =

Poasa is a surname. Notable people with the surname include:

- Poasa Faamausili (born 1996), New Zealand rugby league footballer
- Poasa Waqanibau (born 1994), Fijian rugby union player
