= Luteru =

Luteru is a Samoan given name. Notable people with the name include:

- Luteru Laulala (born 1995), New Zealand rugby union player
- Luteru Taylor (born 1984), New Zealand cricketer
- Luteru Tolai (born 1998), New Zealand rugby union player
