= Asafo Aumua =

NZ international rugby union player

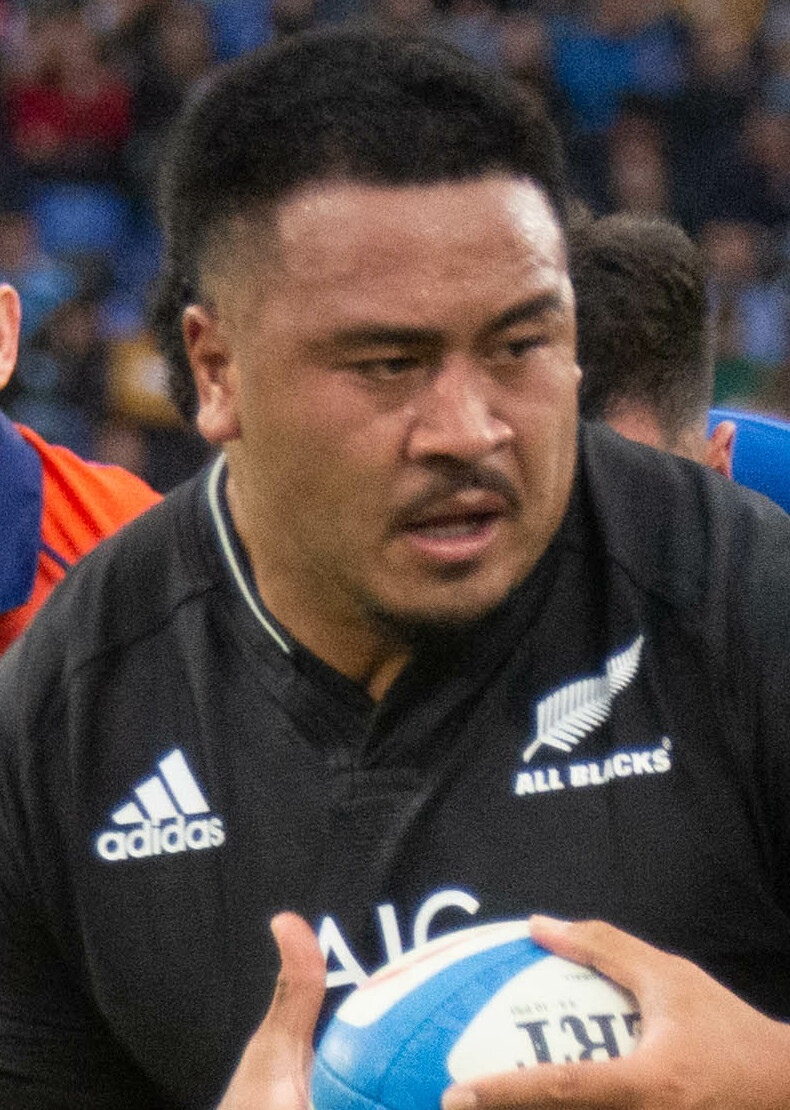
- Aumua in 2021
- Full name: Asafo Junior Aumua
- Born: 5 May 1997 (age 29) Wellington, New Zealand
- Height: 177 cm (5 ft 10 in)
- Weight: 108 kg (238 lb; 17 st 0 lb)
- School: St Patrick's College, Silverstream

Rugby union career
- Position: Hooker
- Current team: Wellington, Hurricanes
Senior career
Years	Team	Apps	(Points)
2016–	Wellington	66	(155)
2018–	Hurricanes	77	(75)
- Correct as of 1 March 2026
International career
Years	Team	Apps	(Points)
2016–2017	New Zealand U20	14	(35)
2017–	New Zealand	30	(10)
- Correct as of 21 November 2026

Asafo Junior Aumua (/aʊˈmuːə/; born 5 May 1997) is a New Zealand professional rugby union player who plays as a hooker for the Hurricanes in Super Rugby and Wellington in the Bunnings NPC.

== Early life ==
Asafo Junior Aumua was born on 5 May 1997 in Wellington, the son of Tautua and Lisa Aumua. The Aumua family are of Samoan descent. Growing up in Naenae, he attended Rātā Street School, Naenae Intermediate School and St. Patrick's College Silverstream. While at secondary school, Aumua was chosen to play for Silverstream first XV at the age of fifteen. He spent three years representing the side, winning two regional sevens titles and was a part of two unbeaten runs through the round robin of the WelTec premiership. In rugby sevens, Aumua was named player of the tournament at the Marist College event, and joined the New Zealand Marist sevens squad for their tour of Samoa. He primarily played hooker, but also played second five-eighth, prop, and number 8 at first XV level.

After his last year at Silverstream, Aumua was enrolled into the 26-man New Zealand Secondary Schools team for a three-match international series in Australia. He was involved in a 24-point victory over Australian Schoolboys, where he scored a try that was recognised by Green and Gold Rugby journalist Nic Darveniza as try of the match, extending New Zealand's lead in the second half. Aumua was one of six Wellington players to represent New Zealand at the World Rugby Under 20 Championships in Manchester in June 2016. The following year, he was named to travel to Tbilisi, in his second Under 20 World Championship campaign. New Zealand won their sixth title after defeating England 64–17 in a record score in a final, scoring ten tries to three. Aumua scored a hat-trick, including one solo try in which he beat no less than six defenders. He became only the second player to score a hat-trick in a final.

== Professional career ==
=== 2016–18 ===
During the 2016 season, at 19 years old, he made his first professional team debut when he came on as a reserve forward during the opening match against Hawke's Bay at McLean Park. Representing the Wellington under-19 team in Taupō, Aumua was ordered back after Leni Apisai failed concussion protocols in preparation against Northland. He scored three tries in the fixture, making him just the fourth hooker to register a hat-trick in the competition's history. Aumua was the side's leading try-scorer with six in 10 games.

His performance at national age grade level in 2017 impressed Wellington head coach Chris Gibbes ahead of the 2017 Mitre 10 Cup, and he was subsequently renamed in the squad for their upcoming season. Aumua started well for Wellington, scoring three tries through the first three games of the competition. His scoring ability was noted after beating outside back defender George Bridge for a 60 metres (66 yards) solo try. It saw Aumua place fourth-equal in the overall leading try-scorers with fellow front rower and teammate, Alex Fidow on seven tries each.

Following his 2017 provincial campaign, Aumua was called up into the All Blacks for the 2017 end of year tour despite the fact that he had not even made his Super Rugby debut. He debuted for New Zealand alongside Matt Duffie and Tim Perry against the Barbarian F.C. in November 2017, replacing Nathan Harris off the bench in the 67th minute. Aumua was denied a potential try due to a forward pass from Hurricanes team-mate Jeffery Toomaga-Allen, but the All Blacks still managed to beat the Barbarians 31–22. He also replaced Harris off the bench 10 days later in a midweek game against a French XV selection, helping New Zealand win 28–23. Because neither of those fixtures was tests, Aumua would still await his test debut.

Aumua made his debut for the Hurricanes, against the Canterbury-based side the Crusaders, on 10 March 2018 during round 4 of the 2018 Super Rugby season. Aumua replaced Ricky Riccitelli in the second half of the match, with the Hurricanes winning against the Crusaders 29–19. Aumua performed well in all four of his 2018 Super Rugby appearances but was ruled out for the rest of the 2018 Super Rugby season due to a fractured wrist sustained against the Sharks during a narrow 38–37 victory in April 2018. Aumua's rehabilitation period was scheduled for 12 weeks.

Following a wrist injury, Aumua appeared in Wellington's 31-man squad announcement after head coach Chris Gibbes released their premiership side in August 2018. He made his return to play for Wellington in week one of the 2018 Mitre 10 Cup competition against Otago. At seasons-end Aumua appeared in their away semi-final, against Auckland and was re-called to the New Zealand squad to prepare for Japan in November for the 2018 end of year tour. Aumua's re-call to the All Blacks unfortunately saw him fail to make the field, with Hurricanes Captain, Dane Coles, returning from injury.

=== 2019–21 ===
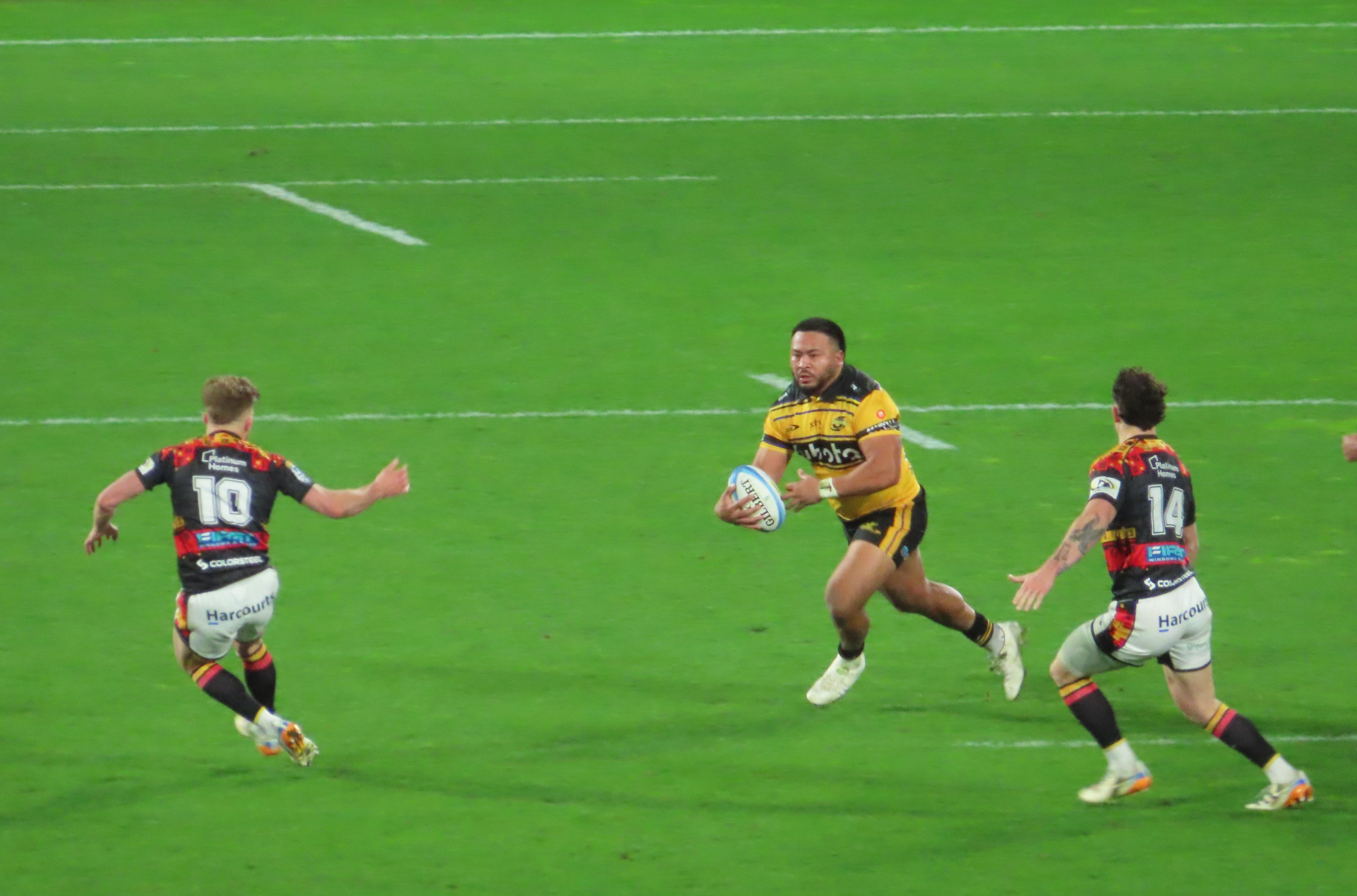
Aumua carrying the ball in the 2026 Super Rugby Pacific final at Hnry Stadium, Wellington.

Aumua rejoined the Hurricanes squad for their upcoming season after head coach John Plumtree named his inclusion during the 2019 Super Rugby side announcement in October 2018. He made his first appearance of 2019 against the Chiefs at FMG Stadium Waikato on 15 March. Aumua picked up a concussion in the last minute of the Chiefs match and was rested for a week. Dane Coles' ongoing run of injuries saw Aumua start in most games of the Super Rugby season, with Coles eventually returning to captain the team in the playoffs.

Aumua played well throughout early 2019, displacing Nathan Harris from the New Zealand squad for the 2019 Rugby Championship. Aumua, however, failed to make his test debut during the competition, with the form of Liam Coltman proving too strong. This saw Aumua as one of five players to be dropped, on 1 August, following a test against South Africa. After being released from international duties, Aumua missed the first-round match against Tasman but returned as one of four changes that were named to play against Hawke's Bay in Napier for the 2019 Mitre 10 Cup. He scored a brace against Waikato to help secure Wellington a home semi-final with a bonus-point win.

Aumua impressed in the inaugural game of the 2020 Super Rugby Aotearoa season after showcasing big tackles and charge downs. In round two, he scored the Hurricanes only try of the game against the Crusaders after an offload from Ngani Laumape to put Aumua in with just ten minutes to go to draw the game at 25 points each. With Dane Coles suffering a minor injury, made way for Aumua to make his first start in the competition against the Highlanders. In August, New Zealand Rugby and the Hurricanes secured a contract extension for Aumua through until 2023.

After the COVID-19 pandemic in New Zealand, it was confirmed an historic one-off North versus South match was to be played in Wellington with no fans. Aumua was selected to take part in the fixture, starting at hooker. The match was classed as a trial for players to be selected in the New Zealand international side. He was recalled into the side by new head coach Ian Foster in a 35-man squad. Before being assembled for international duties, Aumua among other national players played in the Mitre 10 Cup prior to travelling. He played in two matches for Wellington in the first two weeks of the competition. After missing the first test in Auckland, Aumua travelled to Australia for the 2020 Tri Nations Series. He made his first test appearance against Australia along with Akira Ioane, Cullen Grace, and Will Jordan.

=== 2022–present ===
In 2026, Aumua formed part of the Hurricanes squad which won the 2026 Super Rugby Pacific season. On 20 June, the Hurricanes defeated the Chiefs 60–5 in the final.

== Statistics ==
Club	Year	Competition	GP	GS	TRY	CON	PEN	DGL	PTS	WL%	Yellow card	Red card
Wellington	2016	Bunnings NPC (incl. Ranfurly Shield)	10	2	6	0	0	0	30	50.00	0	0
Wellington	2017†	Bunnings NPC (incl. Ranfurly Shield)	10	7	7	0	0	0	35	90.00	0	0
Wellington	2018	Bunnings NPC (incl. Ranfurly Shield)	11	9	4	0	0	0	20	54.55	0	0
Wellington	2019	Bunnings NPC (incl. Ranfurly Shield)	11	11	2	0	0	0	10	72.73	0	0
Wellington	2020	Bunnings NPC (incl. Ranfurly Shield)	2	2	0	0	0	0	0	50.00	0	0
Wellington	2020	Bunnings NPC (incl. Ranfurly Shield)	2	2	0	0	0	0	0	50.00	0	0
Hurricanes	2018	Super Rugby Pacific	4	0	0	0	0	0	0	100.00	0	0
Hurricanes	2019	Super Rugby Pacific	11	5	0	0	0	0	0	72.73	0	0
Hurricanes	2020	Super Rugby Pacific	12	6	3	0	0	0	15	66.67	0	0
Hurricanes	2021	Super Rugby Pacific	9	4	6	0	0	0	30	55.56	0	0
Hurricanes	2022	Super Rugby Pacific	9	7	1	0	0	0	5	44.44	0	0
Career			91	55	29	0	0	0	145	69.23	0	0

Updated: 5 June 2022 Source: Asafo J Aumua Rugby History

=== List of international test tries ===
Try	Date	Venue	Opponent	Result	Competition
1–2	6 November 2021	Stadio Olimpico, Rome, Italy	Italy	9–47 (won)	2021 end-of-year rugby union internationals

Updated: 5 June 2022 Source: Asafo J Aumua Statsguru
