= Stephen Scott (rugby union) =

- Born: Stephen John Scott; 11 September 1955 Christchurch, New Zealand
- Died: 16 June 1994 (aged 38) Balclutha, New Zealand
- Height: 1.71 m (5 ft 7 in)
- Weight: 72 kg (159 lb)
- School: Shirley Boys' High School
- Notable relative: Mitchell Scott (son)

Rugby union career
- Position: Halfback
Provincial / State sides
Years	Team	Apps	(Points)
1976–82	Canterbury	48	
International career
Years	Team	Apps	(Points)
1975–76	New Zealand Colts	3	
1980	New Zealand	0	(0)

Stephen John Scott (11 September 1955 – 16 June 1994) was a New Zealand rugby union player. A halfback, Scott represented Canterbury at a provincial level, and was a member of the New Zealand national side, the All Blacks, on the 1980 tour of Australia and Fiji. He played four matches on that tour but did not play in any internationals.

Scott died in 1994 and his ashes were buried at Wakapuaka Cemetery in Nelson.
