= Jono Hickey =

New Zealand sportsman

Personal information
- Full name: Jonathan David Hickey
- Born: 30 March 1991 (age 35); Auckland, New Zealand
- Nickname: Jono, Wee
- Height: 1.73 m (5 ft 8 in)
- Batting: Left-handed
- Bowling: Leg break
- Role: Wicket-keeper

Domestic team information
- Years: Team
- 2012/13–2014/15: Northern Districts

Career statistics
Competition	FC	LA	T20
Matches	2	21	4
Runs scored	64	460	1
Batting average	16.00	23.00	1.00
100s/50s	0/0	0/2	0/0
Top score	32	67	1
Catches/stumpings	2/–	6/–	2/–
- Source: ESPNcricinfo, 2 October 2024

Jonathan David Hickey (born 30 March 1991) is a New Zealand former sportsman who played representatively in cricket and rugby union, playing wicket-keeper and batsman for the Northern Districts and playing in the scrum-half position for the provincial based ITM Cup side Auckland. Hickey attended Saint Kentigern College and is the older brother of Blues first five-eighths Simon.

== Cricket career ==
Hickey spent his formative cricketing years with Auckland's Cornwall Cricket Club before a move to Counties Manukau after being unsuccessful with making junior representative sides. He joined the Manukau Cricket Club as a 15-year-old and within a year he'd attracted the attention of the New Zealand under-19 selectors. As well as playing for and captaining the Counties Manukau under-17's and under-19's and the Northern District under-19s, Hickey made his premier club cricket debut and his first-class debut for Counties Manukau in 2008.

He then got his first taste of international cricket featuring in the New Zealand under-19 side with three friendlies against Pakistan in Blenheim. Hickey also represented the under-19 side in the 2010 ICC Under-19 Cricket World Cup hosted by New Zealand.

After being a New Zealand Under-19 graduate he switched provinces, moving south to represent Marlborough before leaving to Ireland in 2011 to feature in the Leinster Senior League and Irish Senior Cup for Pembroke. Hickey was then held back by a few injuries and missed opportunities in recent seasons to make his List A debut for the Northern Districts. He overcame that in style, coming into the Ford Trophy side with great zest and punching out vital half-centuries under pressure. Hickey eventually made his First-class debut with side against Auckland during the 2013–14 Plunket Shield season.

== Rugby career ==
Jono Hickey
Rugby union career
- Position: Scrum-half
Senior career
Years	Team	Apps	(Points)
2015–2017	Auckland	32	(129)
2018	Toyota Industries Shuttles	3	(34)
2020	Otago	4	(10)
- Correct as of 2023

Hickey played halfback for the Auckland rugby club Grammar TEC and was selected in the Auckland squad for the 2015 ITM Cup. He continued to play for Auckland in the 2016 and 2017 Mitre 10 Cup seasons. Hickey also coached at Grammar TEC and schools around Auckland to promote rugby in Auckland He left Auckland in 2017 to play for the Toyota Shokki team in Japan.

In 2019 Hickey signed to play with the Hurricanes and Wellington Rugby however was ruled out of the entire 2019 playing year with a major shoulder injury in a Super Rugby pre season match. With his injury and COVID-19 restrictions in Auckland his opportunities to continue his rugby were limited until he received a call to play for the Otago team in the 2020 Mitre 10 Cup. He played 4 games for Otago in October and November 2020.

In March 2022 Hickey was announced as the new Grammar TEC rugby club Director of Rugby. In 2022 he joined the Auckland NPC team as an Assistant Coach.
