= Tim Bateman =

NZ Maori international rugby union player

- Full name: Timothy Edward Sullivan Bateman
- Born: 3 June 1987 (age 39) Greymouth, New Zealand
- Height: 182 cm (6 ft 0 in)
- Weight: 91 kg (201 lb; 14 st 5 lb)
- School: Christchurch Boys' High School

Rugby union career
- Position: Centre
Senior career
Years	Team	Apps	(Points)
2006–2020	Canterbury	52	(100)
2007–2019	Crusaders	51	(40)
2010–2016	Coca-Cola Red Sparks	45	(75)
2012–2014	Hurricanes	37	(10)
2012–2013	Wellington	22	(25)
2018	Ricoh Black Rams	13	(15)
2020–22	Toshiba Brave Lupus	16	(10)
- Correct as of 21 May 2022
International career
Years	Team	Apps	(Points)
2006	New Zealand U19	5	(20)
2007	New Zealand U21	1	(0)
2008–2017	Māori All Blacks	14	(15)
- Correct as of 14 April 2019

Timothy Edward Sullivan Bateman (born 3 June 1987) is a rugby union player from New Zealand. He plays mostly Inside Centre.

He was head boy of Christchurch Boys' High School in Canterbury, New Zealand. He formerly played for the Crusaders and played in Japan for the Coca-Cola Red Sparks. He also had a stint at the Hurricanes in Super Rugby. In 2017, he has returned to play for the Crusaders.

Of Ngāi Tahu descent, Bateman played for the Māori All Blacks in 2008 and 2012. He has also represented New Zealand at Under 19 and Under 21 level.

== Playing career ==
=== School boy rugby ===
While at Christchurch Boys' High School, Bateman appeared alongside All Blacks Colin Slade, Matt Todd and Owen Franks as well as former Crusader Nasi Manu.

=== Later career ===
After spending a few years playing rugby in Japan, Bateman returned home and signed with his former club the Crusaders for the 2017. He played six games and scored three tries in his return season. Bateman was a part of the 2017 Crusaders championship winning side in 2017.

Bateman also signed with former provincial team Canterbury ahead of the 2017 Mitre 10 Cup season.

He scored a try in Canterbury's 35-13 Grand Final win against Tasman.
