= Lalakai Foketi =

Australian rugby union player

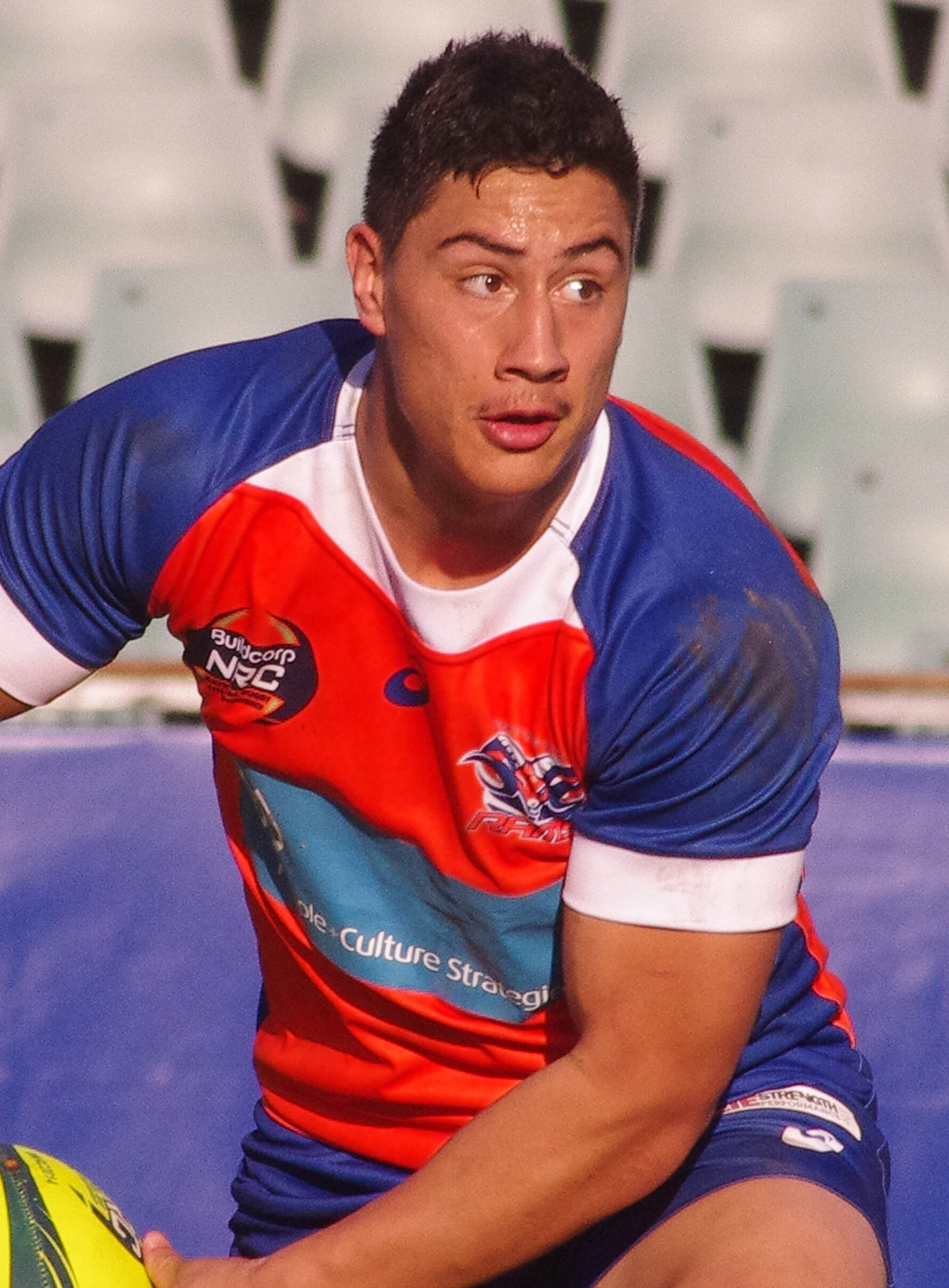
- Foketi with the Greater Sydney Rams in the National Rugby Championship
- Full name: Lalakai Louis Arapeta Foketi
- Born: 22 December 1994 (age 31) Hamilton, Waikato, New Zealand
- Height: 1.86 m (6 ft 1 in)
- Weight: 101 kg (223 lb; 15 st 13 lb)
- School: Balgowlah Boys' High School; The King's School

Rugby union career
- Position: Centre
- Current team: Ospreys
Amateur team(s)
Years	Team	Apps	(Points)
2013	Manly	2	(0)
2018–2020	Eastern Suburbs	13	(35)
Senior career
Years	Team	Apps	(Points)
2014	Rebels	2	(0)
2014	Greater Sydney Rams	4	(0)
2014–2015	Bayonne	9	(0)
2015–2017	Bay of Plenty	30	(75)
2018–2025	Waratahs	83	(45)
2019	Sydney Rays	4	(25)
2026	Chiefs	9	(5)
2026–	Ospreys	0	(0)
- Correct as of 15 June 2026
International career
Years	Team	Apps	(Points)
2013–2014	Australia U20	4	(23)
2022	Australia A	3	(0)
2021–2023	Australia	9	(5)
2025	First Nations & Pasifika XV	1	(0)
- Correct as of 15 June 2026

Lalakai Louis Arapeta Foketi (born 22 December 1994) is a professional rugby union player who currently plays as a centre for the Ospreys in the United Rugby Championship (URC). Born in New Zealand, he has represented Australia at international level.

== Career ==
=== Early career ===
In January 2014, the Melbourne Rebels announced the signing of Foketi ahead of their 2014 season. He was later named in the Rebels' extended playing squad before their first pre-season match against the Waratahs in February.

He was not expected to feature much during his debut season, however a spate of injuries to Rebels backline players saw him earn a first Super Rugby cap against the Waratahs on 23 May 2014.

Foketi was an Australia Schoolboys representative in 2012, and played four matches for the Australia under-20s side at the 2013 IRB Junior World Championship in France. He also played four matches in the 2014 tournament in New Zealand.

=== Bayonne ===
In June 2014, Foketi was announced as a new signing for Bayonne in the South of France ahead of the 2014–15 Top 14 season. Foketi had failed to break through the domestic rugby of Australia, having played just six professional matches by the time of his transfer. Foketi played a total of nine games for Bayonne across the Top 14 and Challenge Cup competitions.

=== NRC and NPC ===
In 2015, Foketi transferred to the Bay of Plenty in New Zealand's National Provincial Championship (NPC) competition (known as the Mitre 10 cup). While there he became a mainstay throughout 2015 and 2016. By 2017, Foketi had played in 30 matches, and scored 15 tries. During his tenure in New Zealand, Foketi had also played various stints at the Greater Sydney Rams in Australia's National Rugby Championship (NRC).

=== Waratahs ===
In the 2018 Super Rugby pre-season, Foketi, whom was 23-year-old, transferred to the New South Wales Waratahs. Foketi was one of several young players that had arrived at the team following the axing of the Perth-based Western Force.

Lalakai Foketi made his Waratahs Super Rugby debut in the 2018 season opener against the Stormers on 24 February 2018, starting in the midfield alongside veteran Australia international Kurtley Beale. In his first year, he featured in 13 matches (starting in five), scoring two tries. The Waratahs finished third on the overall ladder, and lost in the semi-finals to the Lions 44–26 in Johannesburg. It was the first Waratahs finals appearance, and semi-final, since 2015.

Foketi's contract with the Waratahs and Rugby Australia was extended on several occasions, including agreements signed in 2021, 2022, and 2023, the latter was through the end of 2025.

In February 2024, during pre-season training at the Waratahs' training ground in Daceyville, Foketi suffered a neck injury. He was cleared for any serious neck issues and returned to the squad after five weeks. He went on to make 10 appearances without scoring a try amid form struggles and a disappointing campaign for the Waratahs overall. The Sydney Morning Herald later dubbed it "a year from hell" and "the worst season of his career". In 2025, he appeared in nine matches, with injuries, including groin and shoulder problems.

Over his Waratahs tenure from 2018 to 2025, Foketi accumulated 85 appearances, scoring nine tries for a total of 45 points in the Super Rugby (including the Super Rugby AU and Super Rugby Trans-Tasman). His overall appearances with the team peaked at 14 in the 2022 season, where he started in every match (scoring three tries), and made an additional seven appearances for Australia's senior and second international teams during the year.

==== Legal dispute ====
In December 2025, Code Sports and The Roar reported that Foketi had launched legal action against Rugby Australia (RA) and the Waratahs, claiming he was wrongfully dismissed after his contract was terminated the previous month (November). RA ended Foketi's contract without pay after determining he had breached its terms by travelling to New Zealand to undertake promotional activities with his new club, the Chiefs, before his Waratahs contract officially expired on 30 November. Foketi had declined an unpaid early release, but his move to the Chiefs was publicly announced on 2 November. He was reportedly seeking approximately $50k+ in unpaid wages, long-service leave entitlements, and additional damages. He also stated that he had been told by Waratahs coach Dan McKellar that he was not required to attend pre-season training and could take time off with his family, and maintained that he continued to fulfil his contractual obligations, including returning to Australia for a promotional appearance in Perth, and notes that his Chiefs contract did not begin until 1 December. Following the report with The Roar, Foketi said he had no intention of returning to play in Australia again.

=== Chiefs ===
On 30 May 2025, just before the conclusion of the 2025 Super Rugby season, Code Sports reported that Foketi was receiving offers from clubs in France and New Zealand. In July the same publication revealed that Foketi had joined the Hamilton-based Chiefs team in New Zealand (later confirmed to be a one-year deal) for their 2026 season. Confirming earlier reports, Stuff added that Foketi would add depth to the Chiefs midfield for 2026 with the departure of veteran All Black Anton Lienert-Brown, Rameka Poihipi and Gideon Wrampling. Foketi, speaking to the publication, stated that he was "really excited to be coming back to where it all began and be a part of the Chiefs family."

Before the start of the 2026 season had kicked-off, Foketi was ruled out due to a knee injury, and was reported to be fit by round three. Foketi returned from injury and was named in their round three Grand Final rematch squad against the Crusaders at home. Foketi played in the Chiefs' following two matches, starting against the Moana Pasifika, and scoring a try in the 32nd minute in a bonus point win. After playing just three games, Foketi was ruled out due to a hand injury. He did not return until Anzac/Super Round. Since returning, Foketi became a strong substitute player for the Chiefs, and was given a start in their semi-final clash against the Crusaders, which saw them win by 37 points to reach their fourth consecutive Super Rugby final.

=== Ospreys ===
On 12 June 2026, Foketi was announced by Welsh provincial club Ospreys as their newest signing ahead of the 2026–27 United Rugby Championship season alongside fellow Australian player Liam Wright.

== Personal life ==
Foketi is of Māori and Tongan heritage. He is married to a woman (Mason), and has two children. In June 2026, Foketi and his wife announced their third child.

== Career statistics ==
=== Club ===
As of 30 July 2026.

Statistics by club, season and competition
Club	Season	League				Other (Note: Matches in the Challenge Cup.)			Total		
Club	Season	Division	Apps	Tries	Points	Apps	Tries	Points	Apps	Tries	Points
Rebels	2014	Super Rugby	2	0	0	—			2	0	0
Greater Sydney Rams	2014	National Rugby Championship	4	0	0	—			4	0	0
Bayonne	2014–15	Top 14	5	0	0	4	0	0	9	0	0
Bay of Plenty	2015	National Provincial Championship	10	1	5	—			10	1	5
Bay of Plenty	2016	National Provincial Championship	8	6	30	—			8	6	30
Bay of Plenty	2017	National Provincial Championship	12	8	40	—			12	8	40
Bay of Plenty	Total		30	15	75	—			30	15	75
Waratahs	2018	Super Rugby	13	2	10	—			13	2	10
Waratahs	2019	Super Rugby	11	0	0	—			11	0	0
Waratahs	Total		24	2	10	—			24	2	10
Sydney Rays	2019	National Rugby Championship	4	5	25	—			4	5	25
Waratahs	2020	Super Rugby	6	1	5	—			6	1	5
Waratahs	2020	Super Rugby AU	3	0	0	—			3	0	0
Waratahs	2021	Super Rugby AU	5	0	0	—			5	0	0
Waratahs	2021	Super Rugby Trans-Tasman	5	0	0	—			5	0	0
Waratahs	2022	Super Rugby Pacific	14	3	15	—			14	3	15
Waratahs	2023	Super Rugby Pacific	10	3	15	—			10	3	15
Waratahs	2024	Super Rugby Pacific	9	0	0	—			9	0	0
Waratahs	2025	Super Rugby Pacific	9	0	0	—			9	0	0
Waratahs	Total		61	7	35	—			61	7	35
Chiefs	2026	Super Rugby	9	1	5	—			9	1	5
Career total			139	30	150	4	0	0	143	30	150

=== International ===
As of 30 July 2026.

Statistics by team and year
Team	Year	Statistic		
Team	Year	Apps	Tries	Points
Australia	2021	1	0	0
Australia	2022	4	1	5
Australia	2023	4	0	0
Total		9	1	5
Australia A	2022	3	0	0
Total		3	0	0

=== International tries ===
List of international tries scored by Lalakai Foketi
No.	Opponent	Location	Competition	Date	Result	Ref.
1	France	Stade de France, Saint-Denis	2022 Autumn Internationals	5 November 2022	30–29	
