= Mike Delany =

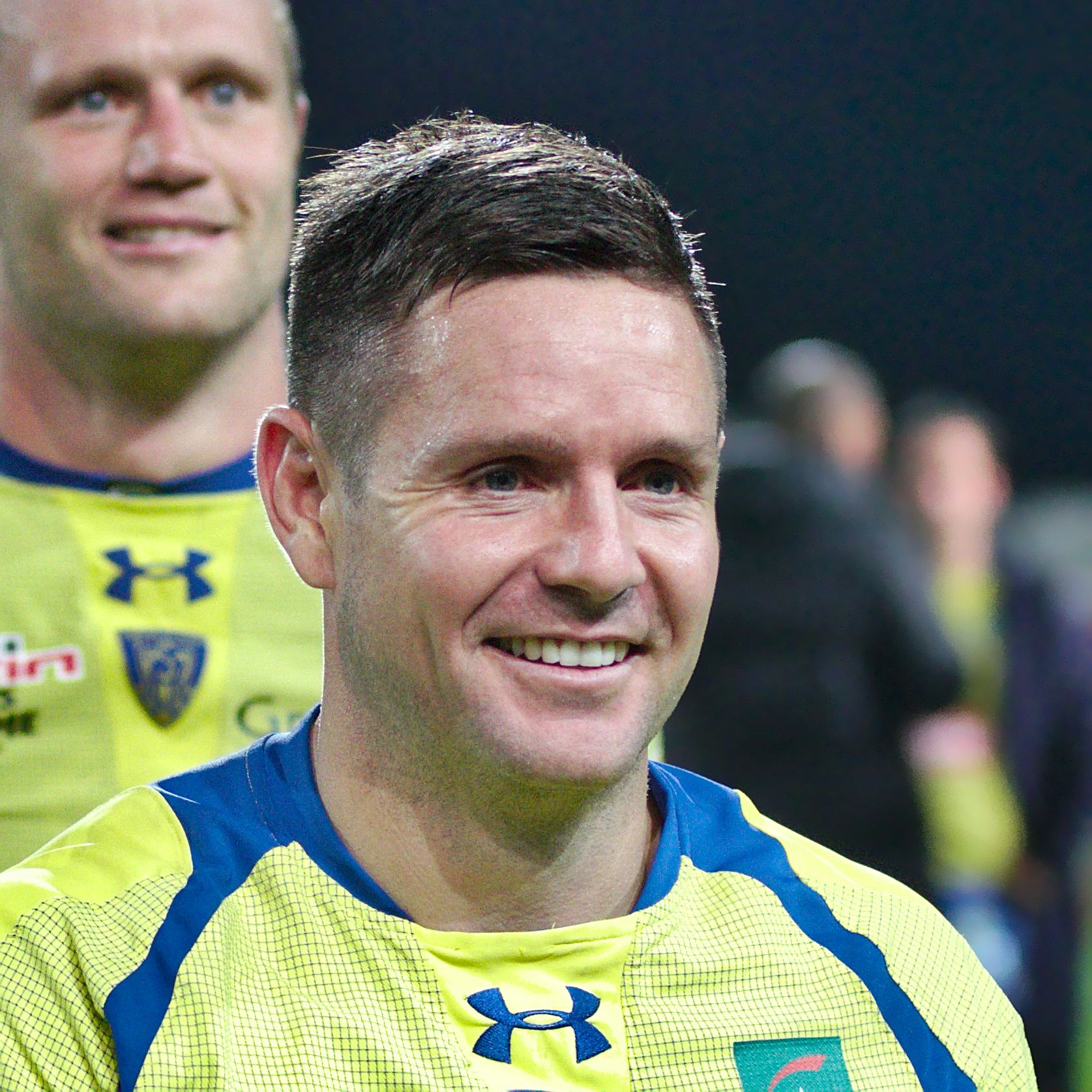
- Born: Michael Peter Delany; 15 June 1982 (age 44) Rotorua, New Zealand
- Height: 1.78 m (5 ft 10 in)
- Weight: 87 kg (13 st 10 lb)
- School: Rotorua Boys' High School

Rugby union career
- Position(s): Fly-half, Fullback
Senior career
| Years | Team | Apps | (Points) |
| 2005–2010, 2017-2018 | Bay of Plenty | 75 | (609) |
| 2008 | Highlanders | 10 | (48) |
| 2009–2011 | Chiefs | 28 | (63) |
| 2011–2013 | Panasonic Wild Knights | 27 | (80) |
| 2012 | Highlanders | 9 | (59) |
| 2013–2015 | Clermont | 40 | (126) |
| 2015–2017 | Newcastle Falcons | 29 | (153) |
| 2018 | Crusaders | 5 | (14) |
- Correct as of 2 September 2018
International career
| Years | Team | Apps | (Points) |
| 2009 | New Zealand | 1 | (3) |

Mike Peter Delany (born 15 June 1982) is a retired New Zealand rugby union player who last played for the Crusaders in Super Rugby and Bay of Plenty in the Mitre 10 Cup.

Delany plays at fly-half but can also cover fullback. Prior to playing for the Chiefs, he played for the Highlanders in Super Rugby. Delany was chosen as one of 4 new caps to the New Zealand team for their End of Year of tour of 2009, playing one test match on the tour. He made his test debut against Italy where the All Blacks won by 20–6. He also played a game for the All Blacks against the Barbarians. In 2011 he signed for the Panasonic Wild Knights. In 2012, due to injuries to both starting and back up five-eighths Colin Slade and Lima Sopoaga for the Highlanders, Delany signed with his former team to fill the position until they returned. Whilst still under contract with the Panasonic Wild Knights, he played on loan at Clermont Auvergne, but signed a two-year deal with the French club in April 2013. On 19 February 2015, Delany travelled to England to join Newcastle Falcons in the Aviva Premiership on a three-year deal. In 2017, Delany returned to New Zealand to play for Bay of Plenty. Following a great performance during the 2017 Mitre 10 Cup, he signed with the Crusaders for the 2018 Super Rugby season. He made 5 appearances for the Crusaders en route to the club winning their ninth title. This was Delany's first title at the professional level. He retired at the conclusion of the 2018 Mitre 10 Cup.
