= Jesse Parete =

New Zealand rugby union player

- Born: 20 April 1993 (age 33) Hāwera, New Zealand
- Height: 196 cm (6 ft 5 in)
- Weight: 115 kg (254 lb; 18 st 2 lb)
- School: New Plymouth Boys' High School

Rugby union career
- Position(s): Lock, Number 8, Flanker
- Current team: New England Free Jacks
Senior career
| Years | Team | Apps | (Points) |
| 2014–2019, 2022 | Taranaki | 13 | (5) |
| 2016–2017 | Bay of Plenty | 20 | (50) |
| 2018–2019 | Chiefs | 24 | (15) |
| 2020 | Highlanders | 9 | (0) |
| 2021–2022 | Canon Eagles | 2 | (0) |
| 2022– | New England Free Jacks | | |
- Correct as of 6 February 2022

Jesse Parete (born 20 April 1993) is a New Zealand rugby union player for the Highlanders in Super Rugby. His position is in the back row. He also plays for the New England Free Jacks in Major League Rugby (MLR) in the United States.

Parete made his Super Rugby debut vs the Jaguares in Round 12, scoring a try in the final minutes of the match.
