= Sam Christie =

New Zealand rugby player (born 1986)

- Born: Sam Christie; 26 September 1986 (age 40) Tokoroa, New Zealand
- Height: 1.81 m (5 ft 11 1/2 in)
- Weight: 90 kg (14 st 2 lb; 198 lb)
- School: Hamilton Boys' High School

Rugby union career
- Position: Fly-half / Fullback
Senior career
Years	Team	Apps	(Points)
2014–2016	Benetton Treviso	49	(32)
2018–2021	Mazda Blue Zoomers	23	
- Correct as of 22 February 2021
Provincial / State sides
Years	Team	Apps	(Points)
2006–2013, 2016–2017	Waikato	44	(36)
- Correct as of 22 February 2021
Super Rugby
Years	Team	Apps	(Points)
2013	Western Force	4	(0)
- Correct as of 10 June 2013

Sam Christie (born 26 September 1986) is a New Zealand rugby union footballer who regularly plays as a fly-half.

Born in Tokoroa to Australian parents, Christie has represented New Zealand Schoolboys, Waikato Development, Waikato Under 20 and Bay of Plenty Under 23. He made his senior debut for Waikato during the 2006 season and has played 33 games and scored 15 points for his province.

Having been overlooked by all of the Super Rugby franchises in his homeland, Christie agreed to join the Western Force ahead of the 2013 Super Rugby season where he will form part of the Extended Playing Squad.
