= Mitchell Scott =

NZ rugby union player (born 1991)

- Born: Mitchell John Scott; 3 February 1991 (age 35) Nelson, New Zealand
- Height: 1.80 m (5 ft 11 in)
- Weight: 88 kg (13 st 12 lb)
- School: Nelson College
- Notable relative: Stephen Scott (father)

Rugby union career
- Position(s): Wing, Fullback
Provincial / State sides
Years	Team	Apps	(Points)
2011–2015	Tasman	38	(50)
2015	Force	3	(5)
2016−	Otago	17	(25)
- Correct as of 28 November 2017
International career
Years	Team	Apps	(Points)
2011	New Zealand U20	4	(10)
- Correct as of 5 November 2012

Mitchell John Scott (born 3 February 1991) is a New Zealand rugby union player who currently plays as a wing for Otago in the New Zealand NPC competition.

== Early life and family ==
Scott was born in Nelson in 1991, the son of former All Blacks halfback Stephen Scott, and was educated at Nelson College from 2002 to 2009.

== Rugby union career ==
=== ITM Cup ===
Scott began his senior career in 2011 with his local team, the Tasman Makos. An impressive debut ITM Cup season saw him named in the Crusaders wider training group for the 2012 Super Rugby season, however injury hampered him throughout 2012 and he didn't make any Super Rugby or ITM Cup appearances that year. 2013 was much more successful for Scott as he scored 5 tries in 11 matches for the Makos to help them gain promotion to the ITM Cup Premiership Division. The Makos good form continued into 2014 and Scott made 9 appearances to help the men from Nelson reach the final of the ITM Cup Premiership where they went down 36-32 to Taranaki. Despite this disappointment, Scott was signed to a Super Rugby contract by Australian franchise the Western Force ahead of the 2015 Super Rugby season.

=== International ===
Scott was a member of the New Zealand Under 20 side that won the 2011 IRB Junior World Championship in Italy.
