= Lachlan Boshier =

NZ rugby union player

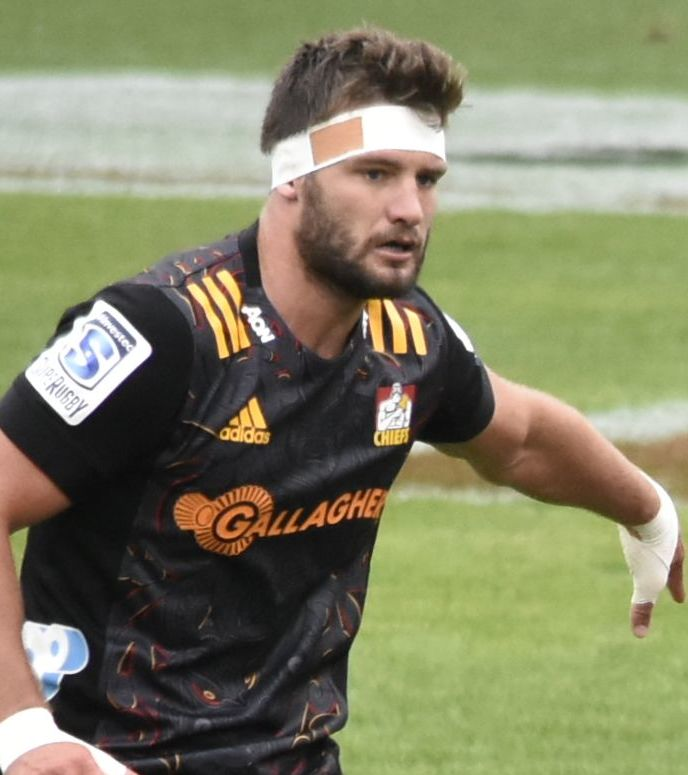
- Boshier in 2020
- Full name: Lachlan Scott Boshier
- Born: 16 November 1994 (age 31) New Plymouth, New Zealand
- Height: 191 cm (6 ft 3 in)
- Weight: 107 kg (236 lb; 16 st 12 lb)
- School: New Plymouth Boys' High School
- Notable relative: Kaylum Boshier (brother)

Rugby union career
- Position: Flanker
- Current team: Panasonic Wild Knights
Senior career
Years	Team	Apps	(Points)
2014–2021	Taranaki	50	(50)
2016–2021	Chiefs	64	(85)
2022–	Panasonic Wild Knights	76	(70)
- Correct as of 16 July 2021
International career
Years	Team	Apps	(Points)
2014	New Zealand U20	4	(5)
2017	New Zealand Barbarians	1	(0)
- Correct as of 16 July 2021

Lachlan Boshier (born 16 November 1994) is a New Zealand rugby union player who currently plays as a loose forward for Taranaki in New Zealand's domestic Mitre 10 Cup and the Chiefs in the international Super Rugby competition.

== Early career ==
Boshier was born in New Plymouth and attended New Plymouth Boys' High School where he captained their first XV. Upon leaving school, he took up a building apprenticeship while making his way through the ranks in his local province, Taranaki.

== Senior career ==
Boshier debuted for Taranaki during their Premiership winning season of 2014, however due to strong competition for places he only appeared once that year. He established himself as more of a regular in 2015, making 8 appearances as the Bulls reached the competition's semi-finals before going down to Canterbury. 2016 was largely a year of frustration as injury held him back in the early part of the year and once fit again he mostly had to make do with substitute appearances in a competitive Taranaki side which once again made the Mitre 10 Cup semi-finals.

== Super Rugby career ==
Season ending injuries to flankers Mitchell Karpik and Sam Henwood, saw Boshier called into the Chiefs Super Rugby squad early in 2016. He acquitted himself well at that level and featured in 7 games, scoring one try as his side reached the semi-finals of the competition. He was subsequently promoted to the franchise's full squad for the 2017 Super Rugby season.

== International career ==
Boshier represented New Zealand at schoolboy level and was a member of the New Zealand Under-20 side which competed in the 2014 IRB Junior World Championship in his home country.

== Honours ==
Taranaki

- Mitre 10 Cup Premiership - 2014

== Super Rugby statistics ==
As of 14 August 2016

Season	Team	Games	Starts	Sub	Mins	Tries	Cons	Pens	Drops	Points	Yel	Red
2016	Chiefs	7	1	6	218	1	0	0	0	5	0	0
Total		7	1	6	218	1	0	0	0	5	0	0
