= Marcel Renata =

NZ rugby union player (born 1994)

- Full name: Marcel Tukerangi Renata
- Born: 24 February 1994 (age 32) Auckland, New Zealand
- Height: 189 cm (6 ft 2 in)
- Weight: 121 kg (267 lb; 19 st 1 lb)
- School: King's College

Rugby union career
- Position: Prop
- Current team: Auckland, Blues
Senior career
Years	Team	Apps	(Points)
2015–	Auckland	53	(15)
2018	Hurricanes	2	(0)
2019–	Blues	66	(35)
- Correct as of 16 July 2022
International career
Years	Team	Apps	(Points)
2015–2022	Māori All Blacks	15	(0)
2017	New Zealand Barbarians	1	(0)
- Correct as of 16 July 2022

Marcel T. Renata (born 24 February 1994) is a New Zealand rugby union player who currently plays as a prop for Auckland in New Zealand's domestic Mitre 10 Cup.

== Senior career ==
Renata first made the Auckland provincial squad in 2015 and it was largely a year of learning for him as he made only 2 substitute appearances. The following year he saw much more action, making 9 appearances, 6 of which were from the start in the number 3 jersey.

== International ==
Whilst playing club rugby for the Varsity Vipers in Auckland, Renata was a late addition to the Māori All Blacks squad in 2015, making his debut off the bench against the New Zealand Barbarians side on the 18th of July. He was then selected by Head Coach Colin Cooper for the 2016 end of year tour, on which he played in all three matches.

== Personal life ==
In early 2024, Renata had the middle finger of his right hand electively amputated at the knuckle due to persistent medical problems after the finger had been dislocated.
