= Latu Vaeno =

Tongan rugby union player

- Born: Latu Malohi Vaeno; 5 January 1995 (age 31) Nuku'alofa, Tonga
- Height: 1.88 m (6 ft 2 in)
- Weight: 94 kg (207 lb)
- School: Rotorua Boys' High School

Rugby union career
- Position(s): Wing, Centre
- Current team: Taranaki
Senior career
Years	Team	Apps	(Points)
2015–2019	Taranaki	25	(20)
2017	→ Otago (loan)	8	(5)
2019−	Valorugby Emilia		
- Correct as of 8 November 2018
Super Rugby
Years	Team	Apps	(Points)
2016	Chiefs	2	(0)
International career
Years	Team	Apps	(Points)
2018−	Tonga	1	

Latu Malohi Vaeno (born 5 January 1995) is a Tongan-born, New Zealand rugby union player who currently plays as an outside back for Taranaki in the ITM Cup. A strong debut season for them in 2015 saw him named in the Chiefs wider training group ahead of the 2016 Super Rugby season.

Vaeno moved to Rotorua Boys' High School as a teenager on a rugby scholarship, arriving in 2012 having impressed in playing for the Tonga under-19s in his first year of rugby, after previously playing volleyball.
