= Trael Joass =

New Zealand rugby union player

- Born: 14 May 1995 (age 31)
- Height: 1.9 m (6 ft 3 in)
- Weight: 102 kg (225 lb)

Rugby union career
- Position: Forward
Senior career
Years	Team	Apps	(Points)
- Tasman Mako
National sevens team
Years	Team		Comps
2017–Present	New Zealand		88 (50)
Medal record
Men's rugby sevens
Representing New Zealand
Commonwealth Games
Gold medal – first place	2018 Gold Coast	Team competition
Rugby World Cup Sevens
Gold medal – first place	2018 San Francisco	Team competition

Trael Joass (born 14 May 1995) is a New Zealand rugby union player.

== Rugby career ==
After playing for Wanderers in Nelson's club rugby competition, Joass represented Tasman Mako in the Mitre 10 Cup and has captained the Tasman Mako seven team, in 2017 he made his All Blacks Sevens debut in Sydney that same year. Joass played as New Zealand won the Gold Medal at the 2018 Commonwealth Games and scored a try in the 2018 Rugby World Cup Sevens Final in San Francisco as the All Blacks defeated England to win the title.

Joass was named as a non-travelling reserve for the All Blacks Sevens squad for the 2022 Commonwealth Games in Birmingham.

== Personal life ==
In 2014 Joass was playing in a club game in Brightwater, Wanderers versus Marist, when he began suffering cramps in his chest. He was subsequently notified by a cardiologist that he would risk his life if he continued to play sport. He had been feeling heart murmurs from the age of 16. He was told he wasn't allowed to go to the gym and wasn't allowed to run until he had an operation on his heart. He credited his family with helping him and was quoted as saying "Without them (family) I'm nothing, I'm probably just a Māori back in Whangārei doing the wrong things, so they've (family) been huge. They have more belief in me than I believe in myself."
