= Terrence Hepetema =

- Born: Terrence Rangi-Tanirau Hepetema; 3 January 1992 (age 34) Harrow, England
- Height: 6 ft (183 cm)
- Weight: 225 lb (102 kg)
- School: Mana college
- Notable relative: Anthony Hepetema
- Occupation: Māori All Black

Rugby union career
- Position: Centre
Senior career
| Years | Team | Apps | (Points) |
| 2013–2014 | Leicester Tigers | 13 | (30) |
| 2015 | Doncaster Knights | 3 | (0) |
| 2018–2022 | London Irish | 67 | (30) |
| 2022–2024 | FC Grenoble | 29 | |
| 2024– | Shimizu Koto Blue Sharks | 19 | (20) |
- Correct as of 29
Provincial / State sides
| Years | Team | Apps | (Points) |
| 2013 | Randwick | 46 | (50) |
| 2015–2018 | Bay of Plenty | 39 | (65) |
- Correct as of 7 May 2018
Super Rugby
| Years | Team | Apps | (Points) |
| 2013 | Waratahs | 1 | (0) |
| 2018–2018 | Blues | 8 | (5) |

Terrence Rangi-Tanirau Hepetema (born 3 January 1992) is a New Zealand rugby union player for the Grenoble in Pro D2. His preferred position is centre. His grandfather Anthony Hepetema played for the Māori All Blacks.

Hepetema has previously played for Randwick and the Waratahs in Australia. In September 2013 he signed for Leicester Tigers in England where he stayed for two years before returning to New Zealand to join the Bay of Plenty Steamers.

On 7 February 2022, Hepetema would leave London Irish to move to France to join Grenoble in the Pro D2 competition from the 2022–23 season.

Born in Brent, England Hepetema is qualified to play international rugby for Australia and England as well as New Zealand.
