= Sam Anderson-Heather =

Cook Islands international rugby union player

- Full name: Samuel George Anderson-Heather
- Born: 15 February 1988 (age 38) Dunedin, New Zealand
- Height: 1.81 m (5 ft 11 in)
- Weight: 104 kg (16 st 5 lb; 229 lb)

Rugby union career
- Position: Hooker
- Current team: Otago / Highlanders
Senior career
Years	Team	Apps	(Points)
2012–2018	Otago	62	(45)
2014	Highlanders	1	(0)
2018	Crusaders	1	(0)
- Correct as of 3 december 2020
International career
Years	Team	Apps	(Points)
2018	Cook Islands	2	(0)
- Correct as of 3 december 2020

Sam Anderson-Heather (born 15 February 1988) is a former New Zealand rugby union player who played as a hooker for Otago in the ITM Cup and the Highlanders in Super Rugby.

== Career ==
Anderson-Heather's early career was largely injury hit and despite being named in the Highlanders wider-training squad in both 2010 and 2011 he barely featured. 2012 saw an upturn in his fortunes and he got regular game time at ITM Cup level. The departure of Shota Horie to the Melbourne Rebels in 2013 saw him firmly installed as back-up to Liam Coltman for the Otago Razorbacks.

Injuries to 2 of the Highlanders 3 senior hookers in the middle of the 2014 Super Rugby season saw Anderson-Heather called up as short-term injury cover. He made his Super Rugby debut on 24 May 2014 as second-half replacement for Ged Robinson in a 30–32 loss to the Crusaders.
