= Poasa Waqanibau =

Fijian rugby union player (born 1994)

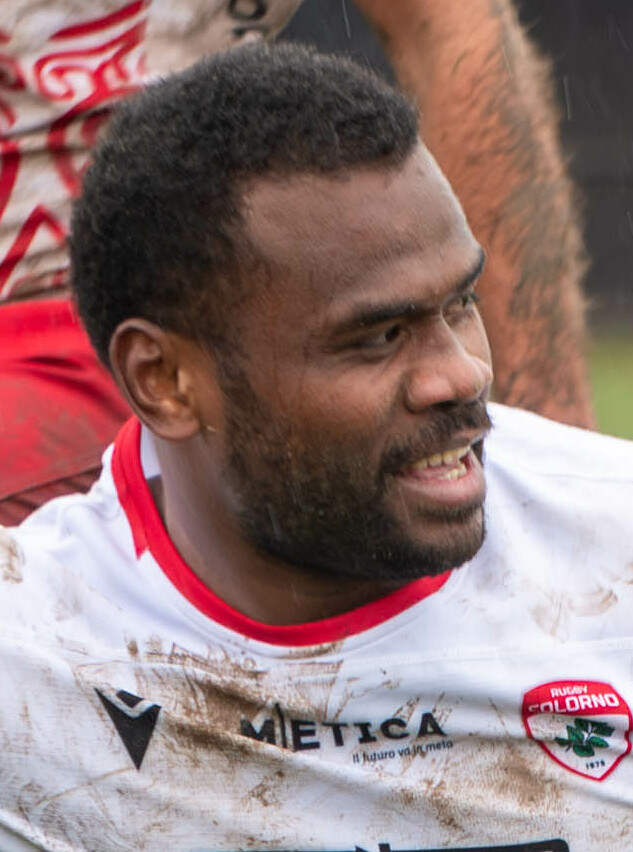
- Waqanibau in 2024
- Born: 24 March 1994 (age 32) Vunisinu, Dreketi, Rewa, Fiji
- Height: 6 ft 2 in (1.88 m)
- Weight: 230 lb (100 kg)
- School: Ratu Kadavulevu School

Rugby union career
- Position: Wing
Amateur team(s)
Years	Team	Apps	(Points)
2015−2017	Border RFC		
Senior career
Years	Team	Apps	(Points)
2018–2019	Fijian Drua	7	(0)
2020–2022	New England Free Jacks	20	(10)
2022–2023	Calvisano	20	(20)
2023–	Colorno		
- Correct as of 20 January 2021
Provincial / State sides
Years	Team	Apps	(Points)
2017	Canterbury	6	(5)
International career
Years	Team	Apps	(Points)
2014	Fiji U20	4	(0)
2015	Fiji Warriors	3	(0)
- Correct as of 20 January 2021

Poasa Waqanibau (born 24 March 1994) is a Fijian professional rugby union player. He plays as a winger for the Colorno in Italian Serie A Elite.

Waqainbau previously, in 2018 and 2019, played for Canterbury in the Mitre 10 Cup and Fijian Drua in the NRC. From 2020 to 2022, he played for the New England Free Jacks in Major League Rugby (MLR). He played for Calvisano in Italian Top10 in 2022−23 season.

He also played for Fiji under-20s.
