= Luteru Laulala =

NZ rugby union player (born 1995)

- Born: 30 May 1995 (age 31) Christchurch, New Zealand
- Height: 1.83 m (6 ft 0 in)
- Weight: 95 kg (14 st 13 lb; 209 lb)
- School: Wesley College
- Notable relative(s): Casey Laulala (brother); Nepo Laulala (brother); Ray Laulala (brother)

Rugby union career
- Position: Fly-Half / Centre / Fullback / Wing
- Current team: Urayasu D-Rocks
Senior career
Years	Team	Apps	(Points)
2014	Canterbury	4	(0)
2016–2021	Counties Manukau	11	(23)
2018	Chiefs	1	(0)
2018-2019 2024-	NTT Communications Shining Arcs	22	(104)
2021-2022	Toyota Industries Shuttles	9	(48)
2022-2024	Canon Eagles	4	(10)
- Correct as of 14 November 2016
International career
Years	Team	Apps	(Points)
2012	NZ Schools Barbarians		
2014	Samoa U20	5	(0)
2015	New Zealand U20	3	(5)
- Correct as of 14 November 2016

Luteru Laulala (born 30 May 1995) is a New Zealand rugby union player who currently plays for Counties Manukau in New Zealand's domestic Mitre 10 Cup. He is a utility back who is capable of playing as a first five-eighth, fullback or wing.

== Senior career ==
Laulala debuted for Canterbury during the 2014 ITM Cup and made four appearances in total, one of which was from the start. He joined Counties Manukau in 2016 along with older brother, All Blacks international, Nepo. While his brother missed the entire campaign through injury, Luteru played all 11 games, scoring 3 tries and netting 4 conversions as the Steelers reached the Premiership Semi-Finals before going down to Canterbury.

== International ==
Laulala was a New Zealand Schools Barbarians representative in 2012. He was later a member of the Samoa Under 20 side which competed in the 2014 IRB Junior World Championship in New Zealand, before switching his allegiance back to the country of his birth, New Zealand ahead of the 2015 edition of the tournament.
