= 2009 Air New Zealand Cup =

2009 rugby union competition in New Zealand

- Countries: New Zealand
- Date: 30 July – 7 November
- Champions: Canterbury
- Runners-up: Wellington
- Matches played: 91
- Tries scored: 420 (average 4.6 per match)
- Top point scorer: Matt Berquist (159)
- Top try scorer: Zac Guildford (13)

The 2009 Air New Zealand Cup was the 33rd provincial rugby union competition, the fourth since the competition's reconstruction in 2006, involving the top 14 provincial unions in New Zealand. It ran for 15 weeks from 30 July to 7 November. It was also the last edition of the provincial competition to use the Air New Zealand Cup name, as the competition's sponsorship contract with Air New Zealand ended after that season. The 2010 competition will be held under a new name, the ITM Cup.

Unlike previous seasons the 2009 Air New Zealand Cup did not have quarterfinals in their finals format, instead going straight to the semifinals with the top four teams rather than the top eight.

Canterbury were the eventual champions, winning their second title in a row and their seventh overall, it was the first time Canterbury had gone back-to-back in the provincial championship. They beat Wellington, 28–20, at Lancaster Park in Christchurch on 7 November. Wellington were down 18–3 at halftime but came back to close the scores to 25–20 in Canterbury's favour, but a late penalty goal by Stephen Brett put Wellington out of reach and gave Canterbury the win and the championship.

Doubts were raised throughout the season with serious support coming from the four teams likely to be axed, Counties Manukau, Northland, Manawatu, and Tasman, and their supporters, while the financial sustainability of the two unions who were to be promoted to the new first division was questioned. On 11 December the New Zealand Rugby Union decided to stick with the 14 team Air New Zealand Cup and the 12 team Heartland Championship format through 2010.

== Round robin ==
The round robin was the first phase of the competition, which consisted of 91 games over 13 weeks from 30 July to 25 October. The rugby union bonus points system was used to determine which four teams were to go on to the finals. There were seven games in each round.

After the round robin Hawke's Bay, Southland, Wellington and Canterbury came out on top to advance to the finals.

	Semifinalist
(RS)	Ranfurly Shield holders

=== Standings ===
The top four teams from the round robin advanced to the semifinals.

Pos.	Team	Pld	W	D	L	PF	PA	PD	BP1	BP2	Pts
1	Canterbury	13	10	0	3	369	231	138	4	3	47
2	Wellington	13	9	0	4	362	237	125	5	2	43
3	Southland (RS)	13	9	1	3	260	189	71	2	1	41
4	Hawke's Bay	13	8	1	4	372	256	116	6	1	41
5	Auckland	13	8	0	5	272	223	49	3	4	39
6	Waikato	13	8	0	5	285	297	−12	4	0	36
7	Bay of Plenty	13	7	0	6	268	267	1	1	3	32
8	Taranaki	13	6	1	6	252	251	1	1	1	28
9	Tasman	13	6	0	7	243	260	−17	2	2	28
10	Otago	13	5	0	8	260	283	−23	2	5	27
11	Manawatu	13	4	0	9	305	362	−57	3	5	24
12	North Harbour	13	4	0	9	244	320	−76	0	4	20
13	Northland	13	3	1	9	226	341	−115	0	2	16
14	Counties Manukau	13	2	0	11	235	436	−201	2	2	12

- In the event of a two-team tie on points the ranking of teams is decided by:

(1) the winner of the round robin match between the two provinces; then
(2) highest point difference; then
(3) most tries scored; then
(4) a coin toss.

- In the event of a three-team or more tie on points the rankings of teams is decided by:

(1) the province with the most wins against other tied provinces in the Round Robin; then
(2) if two teams remain tied they shall be ranked according to the criteria listed above, but if more than two teams remain tied, they shall be ranked according to criteria (2) to (4) only.

=== Results grid ===
	Auck	BoP	Cant	CM	HB	Mana	NorH	North	Otago	South	Tara	Tas	Wai	Wgtn
Auckland		29–14	16–22	37–14	13–47	23–20	14–16	32–13	22–18	27–13	10–0	8–12	26–18	15–16
Bay of Plenty	14–29		19–17	32–9	19–22	28–27	7–28	19–14	17–26	12–19	24–30	24–13	32–16	21–17
Canterbury	22–16	17–19		28–17	27–20	50–26	19–22	31–21	36–16	3–9	29–17	25–21	46–13	36–14
Counties Manukau	14–37	9–32	17–28		8–54	31–36	19–28	37–21	19–22	6–14	33–21	15–51	8–30	19–62
Hawke's Bay	47–13	22–19	20–27	54–8		35–30	34–17	32–13	32–10	9–18	24–24	28–26	22–30	13–21
Manawatu	20–23	27–28	26–50	36–31	30–35		42–16	18–25	19–12	25–23	10–12	15–34	22–30	15–43
North Harbour	16–14	28–7	22–19	28–19	17–34	16–42		23–26	9–29	22–24	13–17	15–19	22–33	13–37
Northland	13–32	14–19	21–31	21–37	13–32	25–18	26–23		7–29	15–15	29–16	16–21	19–27	7–41
Otago	18–22	26–17	16–36	22–19	10–32	12–19	29–9	29–7		19–26	10–38	21–0	29–35	19–23
Southland	13–27	19–12	9–3	14–6	18–9	23–25	24–22	15–15	26–19		29–13	41–0	16–6	13–32
Taranaki	0–10	30–24	17–29	21–33	24–24	12–10	17–13	16–29	38–10	13–29		21–9	14–15	29–16
Tasman	12–8	13–24	21–25	51–15	26–28	34–15	19–15	21–16	0–21	0–41	9–21		23–9	14–22
Waikato	18–26	16–32	13–46	30–8	30–22	30–22	33–22	27–19	35–29	6–16	15–14	9–23		23–18
Wellington	16–15	17–21	14–36	62–19	21–13	43–15	37–13	41–7	23–19	32–13	16–29	22–14	18–23	

Home game	Away game

=== Statistics ===
==== Team ====
The lists of how many tries and points each team has scored in the 2009 Air NZ Cup Round Robin.

Hawke's Bay scored the most points this season with 372 points while Southland had the best defensive record with 189 points scored against them. Hawke's Bay also scored, along with Canterbury and Wellington, the most tries this season with 40. Southland gave up the fewest tries as well of points with only 15 tries scored against them.

===== Points =====
The table shows how many points were scored by each team (white) and how many points each team was scored against them (grey) in the 2009 Air New Zealand Cup. Hawke's Bay scored the most points this season with 372 points with an average of 28.6 points per game while Southland had the best defensive record with 189 points scored against them at an average of 14.5 points per game.

Team	Points by round																										Total		AVG	
Team	1		2		3		4		5		6		7		8		9		10		11		12		13		Total		AVG	
Auckland	13	47	16	22	32	13	15	16	29	14	22	18	23	20	14	16	8	12	27	13	10	0	37	14	26	18	272	223	20.9	17.2
Bay of Plenty	19	14	32	9	21	17	32	16	14	29	19	17	12	19	24	13	17	26	19	22	7	28	28	27	24	30	268	267	20.6	20.5
Canterbury	19	22	22	16	46	13	25	21	36	14	17	19	36	16	29	17	31	21	28	17	50	26	27	20	3	9	369	231	28.4	17.8
Counties Manukau	31	36	9	32	15	51	33	21	8	30	19	62	37	21	6	14	19	28	17	28	8	54	14	37	19	22	235	436	18.1	33.5
Hawke's Bay	47	13	13	21	24	24	9	18	28	26	22	30	34	17	32	10	35	30	22	19	54	8	20	27	32	13	372	283	28.6	21.8
Manawatu	36	31	22	30	25	23	19	12	10	12	15	34	20	23	18	25	30	35	15	43	26	50	27	28	42	16	305	362	23.5	27.8
North Harbour	22	19	15	19	9	29	23	26	22	24	13	17	17	34	16	14	28	19	22	33	28	7	13	37	16	42	244	320	18.8	24.6
Northland	14	19	29	16	13	32	26	23	7	29	15	15	21	37	25	18	21	31	16	21	7	41	19	27	13	32	226	341	17.4	26.2
Otago	19	23	19	26	29	9	12	19	29	7	18	22	16	36	10	32	26	17	10	38	29	35	21	0	22	19	260	283	20	21.8
Southland	16	6	26	19	23	25	18	9	24	22	15	15	19	12	14	6	13	32	13	27	41	0	29	13	9	3	260	189	20	14.5
Taranaki	21	9	16	29	24	24	21	33	12	10	17	13	29	16	17	29	14	15	38	10	0	10	13	29	30	24	252	251	19.4	19.3
Tasman	9	21	19	15	51	15	21	25	26	28	34	15	23	9	13	24	12	8	21	16	0	41	0	21	14	22	243	260	18.7	20
Waikato	6	16	30	22	13	46	16	32	30	8	30	22	9	23	23	18	15	14	33	22	35	29	27	19	18	26	285	297	21.9	22.8
Wellington	23	19	21	13	17	21	16	15	14	36	62	19	16	29	18	23	32	13	43	15	41	7	37	13	22	14	362	237	27.8	18.2

For	Against

===== Tries =====
Canterbury, Hawke's Bay and Wellington all scored the most tries during the round robin with 40 each. North Harbour, Northland and Taranaki all scored the fewest tries with only 20 tries each. Southland gave up the fewest tries with 15 while Counties Manukau gave up the most with 48.

Team	Total		Tries by round																									
Team	Total		1		2		3		4		5		6		7		8		9		10		11		12		13	
Auckland	29	22	1	5	1	1	4	1	2	2	4	1	3	2	2	2	1	1	1	2	3	1	1	0	4	2	2	2
Bay of Plenty	24	22	1	1	3	0	2	1	2	1	1	4	1	1	0	1	3	1	2	2	1	1	1	3	3	3	4	3
Canterbury	40	19	1	1	1	1	5	1	3	2	3	2	1	1	5	1	4	1	3	2	3	1	8	4	3	1	0	0
Counties Manukau	30	48	5	5	0	3	2	6	3	2	1	3	3	9	5	2	0	1	3	3	2	3	1	7	2	4	3	1
Hawke's Bay	40	25	5	1	1	2	2	2	0	2	3	2	3	3	5	3	4	1	4	3	1	1	7	1	1	3	4	1
Manawatu	35	47	4	5	3	4	3	3	3	2	1	0	2	5	2	3	0	3	3	4	2	7	4	8	3	3	5	1
North Harbour	20	37	1	1	0	1	0	4	2	2	1	4	1	1	3	5	1	1	3	3	3	4	3	1	1	4	1	5
Northland	20	38	1	1	2	1	1	4	2	2	1	4	2	3	2	5	3	0	2	3	1	2	1	5	1	4	1	4
Otago	23	33	2	2	1	2	4	0	2	3	4	1	2	3	1	5	1	4	2	2	1	4	3	4	2	0	1	3
Southland	28	15	1	0	2	1	3	3	2	0	4	1	3	2	1	0	1	0	1	4	1	3	7	0	2	1	0	0
Taranaki	20	22	2	0	1	2	2	2	2	3	0	1	1	1	2	1	1	4	1	0	4	1	0	1	1	2	3	4
Tasman	26	27	0	2	2	0	6	2	2	3	2	2	5	2	2	0	1	3	2	1	2	1	0	7	0	2	2	1
Waikato	28	27	0	1	4	3	1	5	1	2	3	2	3	3	0	2	2	0	0	1	4	3	4	3	4	1	2	2
Wellington	40	24	2	2	2	1	1	2	2	2	2	3	9	3	1	2	0	2	4	1	7	2	5	1	4	1	1	2

For	Against

===== Disciplinary cards =====
Bay of Plenty were issued the most yellow cards with five while North Harbour were issued the only red card of the season.

Team	Total		Cards by round												
Team	Yellow card	Red card	1	2	3	4	5	6	7	8	9	10	11	12	13
Auckland	2	0	0	0	0	0	0	0	1	0	0	0	0	0	1
Bay of Plenty	5	0	1	0	0	0	0	0	0	2	1	1	0	0	0
Canterbury	1	0	0	1	0	0	0	0	0	0	0	0	0	0	0
Counties Manukau	1	0	0	0	0	0	1	0	0	0	0	0	0	0	0
Hawke's Bay	4	0	0	0	1	0	0	0	0	1	1	0	0	0	1
Manawatu	3	0	0	0	0	0	0	0	0	1	1	0	1	0	0
North Harbour	1	1	0	0	0	0	0	0	0	0	1	0	1	0	0
Northland	3	0	1	0	0	0	0	1	0	0	0	0	0	0	1
Otago	1	0	0	0	0	0	0	0	0	0	0	0	0	1	0
Southland	1	0	0	0	0	0	0	0	1	0	0	0	0	0	0
Taranaki	3	0	0	1	1	0	1	0	0	0	0	0	0	0	0
Tasman	2	0	0	0	0	0	0	0	0	1	0	0	0	1	0
Waikato	3	0	0	0	1	0	0	0	0	1	0	0	1	0	0
Wellington	3	0	0	1	0	0	0	0	1	0	1	0	0	0	0

==== Player ====
A total of 3,953 points were scored, including 406 tries, with a total of 218 players scoring points.

===== Top 10 points scorers =====
Matt Berquist scored the most with 156 points and an average of 14.2 points per game.

Player	Team	Total	Avg	Points per round													Details
Player	Team	Total	Avg	1	2	3	4	5	6	7	8	9	10	11	12	13	Details
Matt Berquist	Hawke's Bay	156	14.2	22	8	14	9	13	DNP	DNP	12	15	17	19	15	12	34 pen; 2 dg; 24 con
Mike Delany	Bay of Plenty	149	12.4	14	17	11	22	9	14	12	9	7	19	2	13	DNP	1 try; 38 pen; 15 con
Lachlan Munro	Northland	146	11.2	9	24	8	21	2	5	16	10	11	11	2	14	13	4 try; 32 pen; 15 con
Callum Bruce	Waikato	125	9.6	6	10	8	11	18	15	9	13	12	13	0	0	8	1 try; 30 pen; 15 con
Willie Ripia	Taranaki	115	10.5	11	DNP	DNP	9	9	5	19	12	9	18	0	8	15	1 try; 29 pen; 1 dg; 10 con
Robbie Robinson	Southland	111	10.1	11	16	8	6	DNP	DNP	14	9	8	8	6	16	9	29 pen; 12 con
Michael Harris	North Harbour	108	10.8	17	15	0	13	DNP	DNP	DNP	11	13	7	13	8	11	28 pen; 12 con
Andrew Goodman	Tasman	106	8.4	3	3	19	11	16	9	5	8	7	11	0	0	4	2 try; 19 pen; 1 dg; 18 con
Daniel Carter	Canterbury	98	16.3	14	22	19	DNP	21	DNP	DNP	DNP	DNP	DNP	5	17	DNP	3 try; 21 pen; 10 con
Daniel Kirkpatrick	Wellington	95	8.6	6	8	6	0	0	18	11	18	12	4	12	DNP	DNP	1 try; 20 pen; 15 con

===== Top try scorers =====
Zac Guildford scored the most tries during the season with 13.

Player	Team	Total	Tries by round												
Player	Team	Total	1	2	3	4	5	6	7	8	9	10	11	12	13
Zac Guildford	Hawke's Bay	13	1	0	0	0	1	1	2	0	3	1	3	1	DNP
Hosea Gear	Wellington	11	1	1	0	1	1	4	DNP	DNP	DNP	DNP	2	1	0
Sean Maitland	Canterbury	8	1	0	0	1	0	0	0	2	2	2	0	0	0
Ben Smith	Otago	6	0	0	1	1	1	0	0	0	2	0	1	0	DNP
Jared Payne	Northland	6	0	0	1	1	1	2	0	1	0	0	1	0	0
Jason Hona	Bay of Plenty	5	0	2	0	0	0	0	0	0	0	0	0	1	2
Jason Shoemark	Hawke's Bay	5	0	0	1	0	1	0	0	2	0	0	1	0	0
Sona Taumalolo	Hawke's Bay	5	1	1	0	0	0	0	0	0	1	0	1	0	1
Sosene Anesi	Waikato	5	0	1	0	0	0	1	0	1	0	0	0	2	0
Many		4	Various												

== Finals ==
The 2009 Air New Zealand Cup Finals contained two semifinals that were played on 30 and 31 October while the grand final was played on 7 November. Canterbury were crowned champions after beating Wellington 28–20 in the 2009 Air New Zealand Cup Final.

Semifinals
30 October – Christchurch
Canterbury	20
Hawke's Bay	3
31 October – Wellington
Wellington	34
Southland	21

Final
7 November – Christchurch
Canterbury	28
Wellington	20

=== Semifinals ===
After the top four teams were determined from the round robin the semifinals were played on 30 and 31 October.

Canterbury beat Hawke's Bay 20–3 in the first semifinal on 30 October. Canterbury had their best defensive performance of the season (points wise) against Hawke's Bay which was subsequently their worst offensive performance of the season. Canterbury gained their second final berth in a row and their first home final since 2001 while Hawke's Bay were knocked out of the competition from the semifinals in the third year in a row.

Wellington beat Southland 34–21 in the second semi. Wellington were leading 19–7 at halftime but Southland made comeback early in the second scoring two converted tries in the first ten minutes. Wellington recovered though with two second half tries to replacement Dane Coles and a fifth penalty by Piri Weepu gave Wellington the win and a fourth straight place in the final. Southland were knocked out for the second time in a row by Wellington in the semifinals.

=== Final ===
The 2009 Air New Zealand Cup Final was played on 7 November at Lancaster Park in Christchurch between Canterbury and Wellington. It was Wellington's eighth final in eleven years while Canterbury were playing their first home final since 2001. Canterbury scored 2 tries in the first half, both coming to Colin Slade, in the 2nd and 35th minute and went into halftime with an 18–3 lead. Wellington came back in the second, reducing the deficit to 5 in the final 5 minutes but a late penalty goal by Stephen Brett in the 78th minute gained Canterbury back-to-back titles for the first time in the 33-year history of the competition, winning 28–20. Wellington, however, have now lost the final for the fourth time in a row, losing all previous Air New Zealand Cup finals.

== Ranfurly Shield ==
The Ranfurly Shield went through 10 challenges this season and changed hands twice, from Wellington to Canterbury in round 5, then from Canterbury to Southland in the last round of the round robin.

Wellington held off Wairarapa Bush 90–19 in a convincing first up match and 61–6 game against Wanganui. Wellington beat Otago 23–19 on 31 July in a match at Wellington Regional Stadium, and then Auckland 16–15 on 22 August. Wellington lost the shield the next week though losing to Canterbury 36–14.

Canterbury won their first challenge against Otago on 12 September, when they won 36 points to 16. They won their next challenge 29–17 against Taranaki on 18 September. Their next challenge was against Northland on 26 September, which they won 31 points to 21. They successfully defended the shield for the fourth time against Manawatu winning 50–26. In their fifth and final challenge of the season, Canterbury lost the Ranfurly Shield to Southland on 22 October 9 points to 3. Southland will not have their first challenge until next season.

=== Fixtures ===
Date	Holder	Score	Challenger	Venue	Attendance
2 July	Wellington	90–19	Wairarapa Bush	Memorial Park, Masterton	5,000
9 July	Wellington	61–6	Wanganui	Cook's Garden, Wanganui	unknown
31 July	Wellington	23–19	Otago	Wellington Regional Stadium, Wellington	11,261
22 August	Wellington	16–15	Auckland	Wellington Regional Stadium, Wellington	13,466
29 August	Wellington	14–36	Canterbury	Wellington Regional Stadium, Wellington	18,511
12 September	Canterbury	36–16	Otago	Lancaster Park, Christchurch	16,500
18 September	Canterbury	29–17	Taranaki	Lancaster Park, Christchurch	8,800
26 September	Canterbury	31–21	Northland	Lancaster Park, Christchurch	unknown
9 October	Canterbury	50–26	Manawatu	Lancaster Park, Christchurch	unknown
22 October	Canterbury	3–9	Southland	Lancaster Park, Christchurch	10,500

== Season highlights ==
=== Provincial rugby reconstruction ===
In June 2009, New Zealand Rugby Union announced that the domestic provincial rugby competition would be revamped for the 2010 season, with the Air New Zealand Cup being replaced by a tiered system. The Air New Zealand Cup would be replaced by a ten-team premier division, a six-team Division One, and a continued form of the Heartland Championship reduced from 12 to 10 teams below that. The proposal quickly faced scrutiny, with critics raising "serious doubts being raised about the ability of two Heartland provinces to join the proposed "second-tier" competition for 2010," while teams proposed for relegation had threatened legal action in response to the move. In December 2009, NZRU announced that the existing format for the Air New Zealand Cup and Heartland Championship would be retained for the 2010 season.

=== Tasman's inclusion ===
The Tasman Rugby Union was in doubt for inclusion 2009 Air New Zealand Cup, stating financial problems as the cause of their potential downfall. But in December 2008, the New Zealand Rugby Union confirmed that they were able to compete in the 2009 competition after new funding arrangements were put in place for Tasman in 2009.

=== Bay of Plenty coaching changes ===
The Bay of Plenty Rugby Union terminated head coach Greg Smith's contract by mutual agreement in August, two weeks into the competition. Technical adviser Sean Horan took his place for the remainder of the season as Steve Miln remained assistant coach. Smith was appointed as Kevin Schuler's successor in March this year, but stood down before the Air NZ Cup competition began on 30 July amid claims of a player revolt and a breakdown with management. A statement released by the Bay of Plenty rugby Union said the termination of Smith's contract was due to "breakdown in certain aspects of the relationship".

=== Hawke's Bay 125th anniversary ===
In 2009, the Hawke's Bay Rugby Union celebrated their 125th anniversary. First founded in 1884 the Hawke's Bay Rugby Union became only the sixth team to celebrate 125 years in New Zealand Rugby.

Rugby in Hawke's Bay began in 1875 when the Napier Football Club changed and adopted rugby rules. By 1878 Napier, calling itself Hawke's Bay arranged matches with Gisborne on a regular basis. The Hawke's Bay union was formed at a meeting of delegates of four clubs inside the region: Napier, Union, Hastings, and Petane. Hawke's Bay were one of the founding members of the New Zealand Rugby Football Union in 1982, and their administrators, Ernest Hoben, became the first secretary and Logan, became a member of the inaugural three-man appeal committee who also served as the first New Zealand selectors.

Hawke's Bay have contributed 48 players to the New Zealand national team throughout their history including George Nēpia, Maurice and Cyril Brownlie, Kel Tremain and Norm Hewitt.

Hawke's Bay was also part of a period during New Zealand Rugby history which came to be known as 'shield fever'. The revival of the Ranfurly Shield's interest was helped by Hawke's Bay's tenure between 1922 and 1927 under head coach Norman McKenzie. They also had another lengthy period from 1967 to 1969 under Colin Le Quesne.

Hawke's Bay have won the National Provincial Championship 2nd division 7 times: in 1979, 1988, 1990, 2001, 2002, 2003, and 2004; and since being promoted up to the Air New Zealand Cup in 2006, have been semifinalists in 2007, 2008, and 2009.

=== Canterbury win the Ranfurly Shield ===
For more information click here.

Canterbury won the Ranfurly Shield off Wellington on 29 August. They won 36–14 in a one-sided affair in which Wellington only scored in the last ten minutes. It was the first time they won the shield since 2007 and the 13th time they have won the shield overall.

Canterbury were leading 26–0 at halftime thanks to tries by George Whitelock and Tim Bateman as well as 2 conversions and 4 penalty goals from Daniel Carter. Canterbury increased their lead to 36 with 15 minutes left while two late tries by Wellington was only a consolation as the challengers cut the holders shield tenure to 6.

=== Southland win the Ranfurly Shield ===
For more information click here.

Southland won the Ranfurly Shield off Canterbury when they beat them 9 points to 3 on 22 October. It was the first time they have won the 'shield' since 1959, 50 years from tenures.

Defense was evident during the game with the only scoring coming from a dropkick by Stephen Brett for Canterbury and 3 penalty goals by Robbie Robinson for Southland. At 3–3 after the halftime break Robinson kicked his second penalty goal 7 minutes in and secured the game with another in the 71st minute of play.

=== Kerikeri ===
Kerikeri hosted its first ever provincial rugby match on 16 August at the Kerikeri Domain when the home team, Northland, lost 32 to 13 to Auckland in front of 6,000 people. It was also the first time Northland have played a home game inside the province outside of Whangārei.

New Zealand Rugby Union CEO Steve Tew said the shift was agreed to given the redevelopment work taking place at Whangārei's Okara Park ahead of the 2011 Rugby World Cup.

Truck and trailer units were used as corporate boxes, a marquee was set up to feed 200 people and a temporary stand was put up that could seat 3000 people. More than 6000 tickets were pre sold and a crowd of 7000 was expected.

=== Taranaki coach quits ===
Taranaki coach Adrian Kennedy quit on 11 November saying the province is too parochial and closed to new ideas. He was the first outsider to coach the team and finished eighth in both his seasons in charge, his winning percentage was below 50%. His tenure was also plagued by bad off-field behaviour from players. Five players were stood down this season after an all-night public drinking binge.

=== Milestones ===
The list of milestones of players and teams who celebrated a significant moment during the 2009 season.

==== Firsts ====
The moments in the 2009 Air New Zealand Cup where it happened for the first time.

===== Hawke's Bay beat Auckland =====
On 1 August the Hawke's Bay Magpies beat Auckland 47–13, this was their first Air New Zealand/NPC win over them and their first win over the Aucklanders since 1974.

Hawke's Bay scored their first of five tries after 25 minutes of play which went wing Zac Guildford who ran down the left-hand touchline after a midfield turnover. After a try just before halftime by flanker Karl Lowe, Hawke's Bay scored three more tries in the second while Auckland couldn't add onto their 13 points scored in the first. 22 points from the boot of first five-eighth Matt Berquist along with five tries gave Hawke's Bay their first win over Auckland in 35 years.

===== Tasman beat North Harbour =====
Tasman beat North Harbour 19–15 on 7 August, it was the first time in Tasman's short history that they have beaten North Harbour. North Harbour were Tasman's first ever Air New Zealand Cup opponent back in 2006 which North Harbour won 33–27 in Blenheim.

North Harbour's points all came from the boot of first five Mike Harris with 5 penalty goals while Tasman were able to score two tries and two penalties to win their first game of the season.

===== Tasman beat Auckland =====
Auckland went down to Tasman, 12–8, for the first time in their two previous meetings. The first time they met Auckland won 46–6.

Tasman gained the halftime lead with a try and conversion from Andrew Goodman while Auckland could only score a penalty goal by Ash Moeke. Soon after the break Tasman scored their second try when Blair Cook took advantage of a blindside which Auckland failed to cover. Tasman were out 12–3 with five minutes before winger Atieli Pakalani made a break through the Tasman defense then passed to hooker Pat Leafa to score the try. The conversion was missed and Tasman held on to win 12 points to 8 with their best defensive performance of the season.

===== Tasman vs Counties Manukau =====
When Tasman and Counties Manukau played each other on 16 August, it was the first time these two teams have faced off in Tasman's 4-year history.

Tasman scored 51 points to Counties Manukau 15 including 6 tries. Both Blair Cook and James Kamana of Tasman scored two tries each while Andrew Goodman converted five of those as well as kicking three penalty goals. Sione Halani and Kade Poki scored the other tries while Matty James kicked a conversion. Counties Manukau only managed two tries to Mark Selwyn and Sherwin Stowers as well as one conversion and penalty goal.

===== Taranaki beat Wellington =====
When Taranaki beat Wellington 29 points to 16, it was the first time they have beaten them in a NPC or Air New Zealand Cup match since 1989.

Taranaki outscored Wellington two tries to one as they ended their 20-year losing streak to their Hurricanes partners. Willie Ripia scored 19 points of the boot by converting both tries and kicking five penalty goals. Daniel Kirkpatrick kicked the remaining 11 points for Wellington but it was not enough to win.

==== Player ====
List of significant moments by players in the 2009 Air New Zealand Cup.

===== David Holwell's 100th game =====
David Holwell, of Northland, celebrated his 100th game for the province on 11 October. However the team could not pull off the upset against his old province Wellington.

Holwell became Northland's 22nd centurion since their formation in 1920. He debuted for Northland in 1995 as 20-year-old against North Harbour. Before his hundredth game Holwell had played 254 first class games where he scored 2181 points including 36 tries, 450 conversion, 365 penalty goals and 2 drop goals.

===== Hosea Gear vs. Counties Manukau =====
When Wellington beat Counties Manukau on 4 September, winger Hosea Gear equaled the record for most tries by a player in an Air New Zealand Cup game with 4, 3 of them in the first 30 minutes. He now holds the record with Peter Playford from Tasman who scored four tries against Northland in 2006. The overall New Zealand provincial rugby record is five on six occasions.

===== Fa'atonu Fili, drop goal record =====
When Wellington beat Auckland 16–15, fly-half Fa'atonu Fili kicked his third drop goal of the season, an Air New Zealand Cup record. He also made his team the holder of most drop goals in a season by a team in the Air New Zealand Cup overtaking Southland in 2007 and Counties Manukau and Hawke's Bay, both in 2008. The overall New Zealand provincial rugby record is 4 by Ron Preston from Bay of Plenty against Waikato in 1985.

===== Andre Taylor vs North Harbour =====
Manawatu's Andre Taylor equaled the record for most points scored in an Air New Zealand Cup match with 27. He scored 2 tries and was given kicking duties where he scored 4 conversions, 2 penalty goals and 1 drop goal. He now shares the record with Jimmy Gopperth from North Harbour who scored 27 points against Counties Manukau in 2008. The overall New Zealand provincial rugby record is held by Ben Blair from Canterbury when he scored 37 points against Counties Manukau in 1999.

=== Player suspensions ===
In total, there were eight player suspensions throughout the 2009 Air New Zealand Cup with only three of them being cleared of any suspension. The largest ban went to Kurt Baker, who was suspended for eight weeks for abusing and threatening a referee.

Player	Team	Date	Offence	Penalty
Paul Williams	Auckland	8 August	Dangerous play	1 week ban
Winston Stanley	Auckland	8 August	Foul play	cleared
Jordan Smiler	Waikato	14 August	Dangerous tackle	1 week ban
Kahn Fotuali'i	Tasman	28 August	Dangerous charge	cleared
Andrew Mailei	North Harbour	25 September	Dangerous tackle	2 week ban
Kurt Baker	Manawatu	16 September	Referee abuse	8 week ban
Luke Braid	Bay of Plenty	26 September	Dangerous tackle	2 week ban
Joe Wheeler	Tasman	17 October	Stamping	cleared

== Pre-season fixtures ==
2009 pre-season games including two Ranfurly Shield matches for Wellington against Wairarapa Bush and Wanganui.

Date	Home	Score	Away	Venue
1 July	North Otago	3–79	Otago	Centennial Park, Oamaru
2 July	Wairarapa Bush	19–90	Wellington (RS)	Memorial Park, Masterton
3 July	Manawatu	13–22	Taranaki	FMG Stadium, Palmerston North
8 July	North Harbour	16–13	Waikato	Moire Park, Massey
8 July	North Otago	18–50	Southland	Centennial Park, Oamaru
9 July	Wanganui	6–61	Wellington (RS)	Cook's Garden, Wanganui
10 July	Hawke's Bay	35–13	Manawatu	McLean Park, Napier
10 July	Taranaki	26–18	Bay of Plenty	Yarrow Stadium, Taranaki
11 July	Mid Canterbury	0–85	Otago	Ashburton Showgrounds, Ashburton
11 July	Counties Manukau	0–14	Auckland	Growers Stadium, Pukekohe
15 July	Northland	7–10	North Harbour	Lindvart Park, Kaikohe
17 July	Taranaki	28–30	Hawke's Bay	TET Stadium, Inglewood
17 July	Auckland	17–12	Waikato	Douglas Field, Waitakere
17 July	Manawatu	38–19	Wellington	FMG Stadium, Palmerston North
17 July	Bay of Plenty	28–19	Counties Manukau	Rugby Park, Whakatane
17 July	Southland	19–7	Canterbury	Rugby Park Stadium, Invercargill
18 July	Tasman	32–33	Otago	Trafalgar Park, Nelson
23 July	North Harbour	6–17	Auckland	North Harbour Stadium Outer Oval, North Shore
24 July	Wellington	31–24	Canterbury	Porirua Park, Wellington
24 July	Waikato	28–24	Taranaki	Waikato Stadium, Waikato
24 July	Counties Manukau	3–10	Northland	Growers Stadium, Pukekohe
24 July	Southland	19–14	Otago	Rugby Park Stadium, Invercargill
24 July	Bay of Plenty	7–35	Hawke's Bay	Tauranga Domain, Tauranga

== Stadiums ==
Team	Stadium	Location	Capacity
Auckland	Eden Park	Kingsland	45,472^{1}
Bay of Plenty	Bay Park Stadium	Mount Maunganui	19,800
Bay of Plenty	Rotorua International Stadium	Rotorua	34,000
Canterbury	Lancaster Park	Christchurch	36,000^{1}
Counties Manukau	Growers Stadium	Pukekohe	18,000
Hawke's Bay	McLean Park	Napier	22,000
Manawatu	FMG Stadium	Palmerston North	18,000
North Harbour	North Harbour Stadium	Albany	25,000
Northland	Okara Park	Whangārei	25,000
Northland	Kerikeri Domain	Kerikeri	6,500^{2}
Otago	Carisbrook	Dunedin	29,000
Southland	Rugby Park Stadium	Invercargill	17,000
Taranaki	Yarrow Stadium	New Plymouth	25,000
Tasman	Lansdowne Park	Blenheim	15,000
Tasman	Trafalagar Park	Nelson	20,080
Waikato	Waikato Stadium	Hamilton	25,800
Wellington	Wellington Regional Stadium	Wellington	34,500

^{1}Construction being applied
^{2}Estimate

== Referees ==
The list of referees who have officiated in the 2009 Air New Zealand Cup. Garratt Williamson has refereed the most games this season with 12. Nathan Pearce officiated the Hawke's Bay, Taranaki game on 15 August, he was the first referee from outside the country to referee an Air New Zealand Cup match, he was followed by fellow Australian Andrew Lees on 11 September and Englishman Wayne Barnes on 24 September.

Referee	Union of governance	No. of games officiated
Garratt Williamson	Wellington Rugby Football Union	12
Vinny Munro	Canterbury Rugby Football Union	10
Keith Brown	Southland Rugby Football Union	9
Josh Noonan	Canterbury Rugby Football Union	8
Jonathan White	Auckland Rugby Football Union	8
Chris Pollock	Wellington Rugby Football Union	7
Kane McBride	Canterbury Rugby Football Union	7
Mike Fraser	Wellington Rugby Football Union	5
Glenn Newman	North Harbour Rugby Union	4
Ben Skeen	Auckland Rugby Football Union	4
Matthew Stanish	Auckland Rugby Football Union	4
Bryce Lawrence	Bay of Plenty Rugby Union	4
James McPhail	Canterbury Rugby Football Union	3
Shane McDermott	Bay of Plenty Rugby Union	2
Nathan Pearce	Australian Rugby Union	2
Andrew Lees	Australian Rugby Union	2
Wayne Barnes	Rugby Football Union	1
Chris Morrison	Taranaki Rugby Football Union	1

== See also ==
- 2009 Heartland Championship
- 2009 New Zealand Women's Rugby Competition
