= 2009 Air New Zealand Cup Finals =

Duration	30 October – 7 November
- Semifinal 1
Date and time	30 October 2009, 19:35
Venue	AMI Stadium, Christchurch
Canterbury	Hawke's Bay
20	3
- Semifinal 2
Date and time	31 October 2009, 19:05
Venue	Westpac Stadium, Wellington
Wellington	Southland
34	21
- Grand Final
Date and time	7 November 2009, 19:35
Venue	AMI Stadium, Christchurch
Canterbury	Wellington
28	20

The 2009 Air New Zealand Cup Finals will determine the winner of the 2009 Air New Zealand Cup season. It will consist of two semifinals on 30 and 31 October and Grand Final on 7 November.

Canterbury were the first team during the round robin to qualify for the finals when they beat Manawatu on 9 October. Canterbury also gained homefield advantage throughout the finals when they beat Hawke's Bay on 16 October. Southland and Wellington were the next teams to gain a playoff spot while Wellington gained a home game in the second semifinal. Southland gained the spot after a final round win over Canterbury while Wellington gained a spot and a home semi with a win over Tasman. Hawke's Bay were the fourth and final team to claim a playoff spot after winning their game in the 13th round with a 4 try bonus point and when Waikato, the only team who could overtake them, lost to Auckland on 24 October.

Canterbury were the first team to qualify for the final of when they beat Hawke's Bay 20 points to 3 on 30 October. It was the second year in a row that Canterbury qualified for the final and the first time that an Air New Zealand Cup final was held at AMI Stadium. They played Wellington who beat Southland on 31 October winning 34–21. They played the 2009 Air New Zealand Cup Final on 7 November. Wellington qualified for all four Air New Zealand Cup finals and their eighth final in eleven years, but only winning in 2000 which was also against Canterbury in Christchurch.

== Fixtures ==
There was a total of three games in the 2009 Air New Zealand Cup Finals: two semifinals on 30 and 31 October and a grand final on 7 November. Canterbury (no. 1 seed) beat Hawke's Bay (no. 4 seed) at AMI Stadium in Christchurch on 30 October. Wellington were the no. 2 seed and beat no. 3 seed Southland on 31 October for the second spot in the 2009 Air New Zealand Cup Final.

Semifinal 1
Date	Home team	Score	Away team	Time	Venue	Attendance
30 October	Canterbury	20–3	Hawke's Bay	19:35	AMI Stadium, Christchurch	8,000
Semifinal 2
Date	Home team	Score	Away team	Time	Venue	Attendance
31 October	Wellington	34–21	Southland	19:05	Westpac Stadium, Wellington	9,073
Grand Final
Date	Home team	Score	Away team	Time	Venue	Attendance
7 November	Canterbury	28–20	Wellington	19:35	AMI Stadium, Christchurch	12,000

== Round robin review ==
Canterbury came out on top during the round robin with 47 competition points, 4 more than their closest contenders, and a league-leading 10 wins. Wellington were second with 43, while Southland and Hawke's Bay were third and fourth respectively and both on 41 competition points.

Hawke's Bay scored the most points throughout the round robin with 372. They also have scored the most tries along with other finalists Canterbury and Wellington with 40. Southland came through the round robin with the best defensive record with only 189 points scored against them and average of 14.5 points a game.

=== Standings ===
Pos.	Team	Pld	W	D	L	PF	PA	PD	BP1	BP2	Pts
1	Canterbury	13	10	0	3	369	231	138	4	3	47
2	Wellington	13	9	0	4	362	237	125	5	2	43
3	Southland (RS)	13	9	1	3	260	189	71	2	1	41
4	Hawke's Bay	13	8	1	4	372	256	116	6	1	41
5	Auckland	13	8	0	5	272	223	49	3	4	39
6	Waikato	13	8	0	5	285	297	-12	4	0	36
7	Bay of Plenty	13	7	0	6	268	267	1	1	3	32
8	Taranaki	13	6	1	6	252	251	1	1	1	28
9	Tasman	13	6	0	7	243	260	-17	2	2	28
10	Otago	13	5	0	8	260	283	-23	2	5	27
11	Manawatu	13	4	0	9	305	362	-57	3	5	24
12	North Harbour	13	4	0	9	244	320	-76	0	4	20
13	Northland	13	3	1	9	226	341	-115	0	2	16
14	Counties Manukau	13	2	0	11	235	436	-201	2	2	12

=== Canterbury ===
Canterbury finished the 2009 Air New Zealand Cup round robin with the most competition points with 47 and were rewarded the no. 1 seed for the playoffs which gave them homefield advantage throughout. They recorded the most wins with 10, scored 369 points, gave up 231 with an overall points differential of 138, the best in the competition. They scored 40 tries, and kicked 35 penalty goals, 2 drop goals and 29 conversion.

Dan Carter scored most of Canterbury's points throughout the season with 98 while Sean Maitland scored most of the tries with 8, third most in the competition.

==== Canterbury squad ====
A total of 37 players played for Canterbury in the 2009 season. George Whitelock was the captain and Rob Penney and Tabai Matson were the coaches.

2009 Canterbury Squad
Props: Wyatt Crockett; Peter Borlase; Andrew Olorenshaw; Owen Franks; Rodney Ah You; Hookers: Corey Flynn; Ti'i Paulo; Steve Fualau; Will Catherwood; Locks: Sam Whitelock; James Broadhurst; Isaac Ross; Luke Ramano; Brad Thorn	Loose forwards: Michael Paterson; George Whitelock (c); Ash Parker; Nasi Manu; Matt Todd; Aaron McCoy; Richie McCaw; Mike Coman; Kieran Read; Halfbacks: Tyson Keats; Willie Heinz; Andy Ellis	Midfielders: Stephen Brett; Ryan Crotty; Adam Whitelock; Casey Laulala; Tim Bateman; Dan Carter; Back Three-Quarters: Sean Maitland; James Paterson; Colin Slade; Tu Umaga-Marshall; Chris Small	Coaches: Rob Penney (Head); Tabai Matson (Asst.); – Most players are capable of playing multiple positions. – Squad only include players who have been named in a starting 15 or reserves bench.

=== Wellington ===
Wellington finished second on the 2009 Air New Zealand Cup points table and were rewarded a home semifinal for it. They finished with 9 wins and 4 losses out of 13 games. They scored 362 points including a league-leading 40 tries as well as 31 penalty goals, 3 drop goals (an Air New Zealand Cup record) and 30 conversions. They also gave up 237 points and finished with a points differential of 125, second best in the competition.

Daniel Kirkpatrick scored most of Wellington's points with 95 of them through 11 games while, for the second year in a row, Hosea Gear lead Wellington in try-scoring with 11 through 9 games including a record-equaling 4 tries against Counties Manukau in round 6.

==== Wellington squad ====
37 players played for Wellington this season. Jacob Ellison was captain and Jamie Joseph and Andre Bell were the coaches.

2009 Wellington Lions
Props: Jacob Ellison (c); John Schwalger; Anthony Perenise; Neemia Tialata; Arden David-Perrot; Hookers: Ged Robinson; Dane Coles; Locks: Api Naikatini; Jeremy Thrush; Polonga Pedro; Nick Paasi; Daniel Ramsey; Mark Reddish	Loose forwards: Faifili Levave; Victor Vito; Scott Fuglistaller; Matthew Luamanu; Rodney So'oialo; Serge Lilo; Masefau Leuliniu; Halfbacks: Alby Mathewson; Ruki Tipuna; Piri Weepu	Midfielders: Daniel Kirkpatrick; Shaun Treeby; Robbie Fruean; Ma'a Nonu; Conrad Smith; Fa'atonu Fili; Charlie Ngatai; Back Three-Quarters: Hosea Gear; David Smith; Tamati Ellison; Buxton Popoali'i; Alipati Leiua; Cory Jane; Apoua Stewart	Coaches: Jamie Joseph (Head); Andre Bell (Asst.); – Most players are capable of playing multiple positions. – Squad only include players who have been named in a starting 15 or reserves bench.

=== Southland ===
Southland finished third on the points table with 41 competition points, 9 wins, 3 losses and 1 draw. They were the best defensive team in the competition with 189 points scored against and an average of 14.5 points a game, they also on 6 occasions held their opponent tryless. They scored 260 points and had an overall points differential of 71. They scored 28 tries, 30 penalty goals and 15 conversions. They also ended the round robin in the possession of the Ranfurly Shield.

Robbie Robinson scored the most points for Southland with 111 points through 11 games and 29 of Southland's 30 penalty goals. Locks Joe Tuineau and Josh Bekhuis were the leading try scores during the round robin with four each.

==== Southland squad ====
30 players have played for Southland during the season, Jamie Mackintosh was captain and Simon Culhane and David Henderson were the coaches.

2009 Southland Stags
Props: Jamie Mackintosh (c); Chris King; Michael Peterson; Fai Mika; Hookers: David Hall; Jason Rutledge; Brayden Mitchell; Locks: Josh Bekhuis; Joe Tuineau; Dave Gannon	Loose forwards: John Hardie; Tim Boys; Hua Tamariki; Dion Bates; Tom Fleming; Noa Soqeta; Halfbacks: Scott Cowan; Jimmy Cowan; Sonny Rangitoheriri	Midfielders: James Wilson; Jason Kawau; Kendrick Lynn; Robbie Robinson; Seminar Manu; John Dodds; Back Three-Quarters: Tony Koonwaiyou; Matt Saunders; Mark Wells; Glen Horton; Pehi Te Whare	Coaches: Simon Culhane; David Henderson; – Most players are capable of playing multiple positions. – Squad only include players who have been named in a starting 15 or reserves bench.

=== Hawke's Bay ===
Hawke's Bay finished the round robin fourth on the points table with 41 competition points and 8 win, 4 losses and 1 draw. They scored the most points out of any other team with 372 and also gave up 256 points for an overall points differential of 116. They came first-equal in tries with 40 along with other finalists Wellington and Canterbury, they also scored the most 5 try bonus points with 6. In total they scored 40 tries, 36 penalty goals, 2 drop goals and 29 conversions.

Matt Berquist scored the most points for the Hawke's Bay team, and the whole competition, with 156 points and an average of 14.2 points a game. They also had the top try scorer of the competition in Zac Guildford who scored 13 tries through 12 games.

==== Hawke's Bay Squad ====
A total of 30 players were part of the Hawke's Bay team this season, Jason Shoemark was captain and Peter Russell and Tom Coventry were the coaches.

2009 Hawke's Bay Magpies
Props: Faka'anaua Taumalolo; Clint Newland; Josh Keys; Jodi Allen; Hookers: Ash Dixon; Hikawera Elliot; Locks: Matt Egan; Ross Kennedy; Adam Bradey; Hugh Reed; Bryn Evans	Loose forwards: Michael Johnson; Karl Lowe; Thomas Waldrom; George Naoupu; Pama Petia; Halfbacks: Chris Eaton; Dane Shelford; Kilifi Fangupu	Midfielders: Matt Berquist; Sam Giddens; Jason Shoemark (c); Andrew Horrell; Aayden Clarke; Richard Buckman; Back Three-Quarters: Zac Guildford; Nick Thomson; Jason Kupa; Mark Jackman; Israel Dagg	Coaches: Peter Russell (Head); Tom Coventry (Asst.); – Most players are capable of playing multiple positions. – Squad only include players who have been named in a starting 15 or reserves bench.

==== Statistics ====
Hawke's Bay scored 372 points this season, most by any other team. Matt Berquist scored the most points with 156, most among players. They also scored 40 tries including the only penalty try of the season; Zac Guildford led them with 13 tries, also most among players. Sona Taumalolo, Ash Dixon, Matt Egan and Ross Kennedy were the only players in the Hawke's Bay team to receive disciplinary cards with yellows in round 3, round 8, round 9 and round 13.

== Semifinal One ==
Canterbury beat Hawke's Bay on 30 October in the first semifinal of the 2009 Air New Zealand Cup finals. Canterbury scored 20 points and put out their best defensive performance of the season only giving up 3 points against Hawke's Bay who were the leading points scorers amongst teams during the round robin. Hawke's Bay were also held tryless for only the second time all season with the previous time being against fellow semifinalists Southland. It was the third year in a row that Hawke's Bay were knocked out in the semifinals.

30 October 2009
19:35 ^{NZDT}

Canterbury	20–3	Hawke's Bay
Tries: Sam Whitelock; Isaac Ross, Stephen Brett; Con: Stephen Brett; Pen: Stephen Brett		Pen: Matt Berquist

AMI Stadium, Christchurch
Attendance: 8,000
Referee: Jonathan White

=== Match summary ===
Line-ups
Canterbury	Pos.	Hawke's Bay
Colin Slade	15	Israel Dagg
Sean Maitland	14	Nick Thompson
Casey Laulala	13	Jason Shoemark (c)
Tim Bateman	12	Richard Buckman
Tu Umaga-Marshall	11	Jason Kupa
Stephen Brett	10	Mathew Berquist
Tyson Keats	9	Chris Eaton
Nasi Manu	8	Thomas Waldrom
George Whitelock (c)	7	Karl Lowe
Michael Paterson	6	Michael Johnson
Sam Whitelock	5	Ross Kennedy
Isaac Ross	4	George Nauopu
Peter Borlase	3	Clint Newland
Ti'i Paulo	2	Hika Elliot
Andrew Olorenshaw	1	Sona Taumalolo
Replacements
Steve Fualau	16	Ash Dixon
Rodney Ah You	17	Josh Keys
Ash Parker	18	Adam Bradey
Matt Todd	19	Matt Egan
Willi Heinz	20	Dane Shelford
Ryan Crotty	21	Aayden Clarke
James Paterson	22	Sam Giddens

Canterbury scored 3 tries and held Hawke's Bay to a penalty goal to win the first semifinal and be the first team to qualify for the 2009 Air New Zealand Cup Final. Hawke's Bay made a late change when Richard Buckman replaced Andrew Horrell in the starting lineups because of a pre-existing injury. Sam Giddens replaced Buckman's spot on the bench.

Lock Sam Whitelock scored the first of Canterbury's tries from broken play when Hawke's Bay couldn't take a high kick from Stephen Brett. Tyson Keats cleaned up the loose ball and passed the ball out to Whitelock to open the scoring 9 minutes into the game. Brett converted the try from wideout and Canterbury were up 7–0.

Canterbury had the chance to score earlier but Michael Paterson couldn't pull in the offload by Sean Maitland after a break down the right hand touchline.

Hawke's Bay's Matt Berquist kicked the only points of Hawke's Bay night from a penalty 40 metres out. That was his only opportunity at goal for Berquist who had an 82.2% success rate during the round robin.

Canterbury scored their second try 4 minutes before halftime when Isaac Ross got the pass from Paterson who first charged down Chris Eaton's clearing kick, then regathered the ball and offloaded to Ross for the try in the corner. Stephen Brett could not convert and Canterbury had a 12–3 lead at halftime.

After ten minutes of the second half Hawke's Bay had possession inside Canterbury's 22-metre line and had them backed up when they knocked on and Canterbury got the ball. They spread the ball wide to Maitland who ran down the touchline into Hawke's Bay's territory, too fast for the scrambling defence, before he passed to Brett in support to score Canterbury's third try of the night. Brett missed once again and Canterbury had a 14-point lead with 30 minutes remaining.

Throughout the remaining minutes Canterbury sustained pressure on their opponents forcing the mistakes and also bringing on fresh legs to finish the game off, all in the final twenty minutes.

Brett kicked a penalty goal 3 minutes before the full-time whistle but had the game wrapped up beforehand with the teams playing most of the second half on Hawke's Bay's side of field. The game finished 20–3 in Canterbury's favour and second straight final berth while Hawke's Bay were knocked out in the semifinals for the third year in a row.

=== Scoring summary ===
- 1st Half
  - Cant – Sam Whitelock try, conversion successful (Stephen Brett). Score: Canterbury 7–0
  - HB – Mathew Berquist penalty goal. Score: Canterbury 7–3
  - Cant – Isaac Ross try, conversion unsuccessful. Score: Canterbury 12–3
- 2nd Half
  - Cant – Stephen Brett try, conversion unsuccessful. Score: Canterbury 17–3
  - Cant – Stephen Brett penalty goal. Score: Canterbury 20–3
- Final: Canterbury 20–3 Hawke's Bay

=== Player movement ===
Canterbury used all of their seven subs during the game while Hawke's Bay made five of their substitutions.

==== Canterbury ====
Player movement
No.	Exiting player	Movement	No.	Replacement player
4	Isaac Ross	(substituted off) 63' (substituted on)	19	Matt Todd
14	Sean Maitland	(substituted off) 66' (substituted on)	22	James Paterson
8	Nasi Manu	(substituted off) 71' (substituted on)	18	Ash Parker
9	Tyson Keats	(substituted off) 74' (substituted on)	20	Willi Heinz
12	Tim Bateman	(substituted off) 74' (substituted on)	21	Ryan Crotty
3	Peter Borlase	(substituted off) 74' (substituted on)	17	Rodney Ah You
2	Ti'i Paulo	(substituted off) 76' (substituted on)	16	Steve Fualau
15	Colin Slade	(substituted off) 79' (substituted on)	12	Tim Bateman

Key
(substituted off) (substituted on) Substitution
Blood bin
Yellow card
(red card) Red card

==== Hawke's Bay ====
Player movement
No.	Exiting player	Movement	No.	Replacement player
13	Jason Shoemark	(substituted off) 40' (substituted on)	22	Sam Giddens
1	Sona Taumalolo	(substituted off) 60' (substituted on)	17	Josh Keys
2	Hika Elliot	(substituted off) 60' (substituted on)	16	Ash Dixon
7	Karl Lowe	(substituted off) 60' (substituted on)	20	Adam Bradey
4	George Nauopu	60' to 66'	19	Matt Egan
5	Ross Kennedy	(substituted off) 66' (substituted on)	19	Matt Egan

Key
(substituted off) (substituted on) Substitution
Blood bin
Yellow card
(red card) Red card

== Semifinal 2 ==
Wellington won the second semifinal against Southland on 31 October. Wellington gained a lead going into halftime and were able to hold on after a Southland comeback early on in the second half to win 34–21.

31 October 2009
19:05^{NZDT}

Wellington	34–21	Southland
Try: Dane Coles (2), David Smith; Con: Piri Weepu (2); Pen: Piri Weepu (5)		Try: Jason Rutledge, Kendrick Lynn, Scott Cowan; Con: Robbie Robinson (3)

Westpac Stadium, Wellington
Attendance: 9,073
Referee: Chris Pollock

=== Match summary ===
Line-ups
Wellington	Pos.	Southland
Apoua Stewart	15	Glen Horton
David Smith	14	Matt Saunders
Alapati Leiua	13	Kendrick Lynn
Shaun Treeby	12	Jason Kawau
Hosea Gear	11	Tony Koonwaiyou
Piri Weepu	10	Robbie Robinson
Alby Mathewson	9	Scott Cowan
Mathew Luamanu	8	Hua Tamariki
Serge Lilo	7	Tim Boys
Victor Vito	6	John Hardie
Daniel Ramsay	5	Joe Tuineau
Jacob Ellison (c)	4	Josh Bekhuis
Anthony Perenise	3	Chris King
Ged Robinson	2	Jason Rutledge
John Schwalger	1	Jamie Mackintosh (c)
Replacements
Dane Coles	16	Braydon Mitchell
Arden David-Perrot	17	Fai Mika
Mark Reddish	18	David Gannon
Scott Fuglistaller	19	Dion Bates
Fa'atonu Fili	20	Sonny Rangitoheriri
Robert Fruean	21	Seminar Manu
Daniel Kirkpatrick	22	James Wilson

Both teams scored 3 tries but Wellington scored 5 penalty goals while Southland had no chance for any goal kicking.

Wellington were up 3 points to nil before the first try was scored by Southland's Jason Rutledge in the 14th minute of play. He got fed the ball and in midfield after an attacking lineout and was too strong for the remaining defenders. Robbie Robinson converted and Southland were up 7–3.

Wellington scored their first try of the match after two more penalties by Weepu. The Lions won the ball from a defending scrum, Anthony Perenise ran the ball up and fed to Alby Mathewson who passed to David Smith to score Wellington's try. Weepu converted the try and with a penalty 2 minutes later Wellington went into halftime with a 19–7 lead.

Southland regained the lead ten minutes into the second half with two tries in quick succession. The first coming to halfback Scott Cowan who stole the ball of opposite Alby Mathewson then had a clear 50-metre run to the line. Robbie Robinson converted and Southland reduced Wellington's lead to 5. Their second come from broken play of a stolen ball from the breakdown. Midfielder Jason Kawau made the break and had an easy draw and pass to fellow midfielder Kendrick Lynn for Southland's third try of the night. Another conversion by Robinson and Southland were ahead 21–19.

That, however, was the last time Southland scored on the night with Wellington have most of the ball throughout the remainder of the match.

After another penalty by Weepu, bringing his tally to 17, Wellington scored the second and third try both to replacement hooker Dane Coles. Coles linked up with Mark Reddish after a counterattack started by Victor Vito and carried on by Hosea Gear for his first and second was from a crossfield kick to fullback Apoua Stewart who fed Victor Vito to draw and pass to an open Coles for his second. Weepu converted the second and Wellington finished with 34–21 advantage and qualified for the fourth final in a row.

=== Scoring summary ===
- 1st half
  - Wgtn – Piri Weepu penalty goal. Score: Wellington 3–0
  - Sth – Jason Rutledge try, conversion successful (Robbie Robinson). Score: Southland 7–3
  - Wgtn – Piri Weepu penalty goal. Score: Southland 7–6
  - Wgtn – Piri Weepu penalty goal. Score: Wellington 9–7
  - Wgtn – David Smith try, conversion successful (Piri Weepu). Score: Wellington 16–7
  - Wgtn – Piri Weepu penalty goal. Score: Wellington 19–7
- 2nd half
  - Sth – Scott Cowan try, conversion successful (Robbie Robinson). Score: Wellington 19–14
  - Sth – Kendrick Lynn try, conversion successful (Robbie Robinson). Score: Southland 21–19
  - Wgtn – Piri Weepu penalty goal. Score: Wellington 22–21
  - Wgtn – Dane Coles try, conversion unsuccessful. Score: Wellington 27–21
  - Wgtn – Dane Coles try, conversion successful (Piri Weepu). Score: Wellington 34–21
- Final: Wellington 34–21 Southland

=== Player movement ===
Both Wellington and Southland used all of their replacements available.

==== Wellington ====
Player movement
No.	Existing player	Topic of movement	No.	Replacement player
5	Daniel Ramsey	(substituted off) 50' (substituted on)	18	Mark Reddish
2	Ged Robinson	(substituted off) 57' (substituted on)	16	Dane Coles
8	Mathew Luamanu	(substituted off) 57' (substituted on)	19	Scott Fuglistaller
13	Alapati Leiua	(substituted off) 75' (substituted on)	21	Robert Fruean
10	Piri Weepu	(substituted off) 76' (substituted on)	22	Daniel Kirkpatrick
15	Apoua Stewart	(substituted off) 76' (substituted on)	20	Fa'atonu Fili
1	John Schwalger	(substituted off) 76' (substituted on)	17	Arden David-Perrot

Key
(substituted off) (substituted on) Substitution
Blood Bin
Yellow Card
(red card) Red Card

==== Southland ====
Player movement
No.	Existing player	Topic of movement	No.	Replacement player
15	Glen Horton	(substituted off) 32' (substituted on)	22	James Wilson
13	Kendrick Lynn	(substituted off) 51' (substituted on)	21	Seminar Manu
5	Joe Tuineau	(substituted off) 51' (substituted on)	18	Dave Gannon
8	Hua Tamariki	(substituted off) 61' (substituted on)	19	Dion Bates
14	Matt Saunders	(substituted off) 66' (substituted on)	20	Sonny Rangitoheriri
3	Chris King	(substituted off) 72' (substituted on)	17	Fai Mika
2	Jason Rutledge	(substituted off) 78' (substituted on)	16	Braydon Mitchell

Key
(substituted off) (substituted on) Substitution
Blood Bin
Yellow Card
(red card) Red Card

== Grand final ==
The 2009 Air New Zealand Cup Final was played on 7 November with Canterbury beating Wellington 28 points to 20. Canterbury had an 18–3 lead into halftime but Wellington fought back to lower the margin to 7 at one point but ultimately finished in Canterbury's favour.

7 November 2009
19:05^{NZDT}

Canterbury	28–20	Wellington
Try: Colin Slade (2); Sean Maitland; Con: Stephen Brett (2); Pen: Stephen Brett (3)		Try: Alapati Leuia; Scott Fuglistaller; Con: Piri Weepu (2); Pen: Piri Weepu (2)

AMI Stadium, Christchurch
Attendance: 12,000
Referee: Vinny Munro

=== Match summary ===
Line-ups
Canterbury	Pos.	Wellington
Colin Slade	15	Apoua Stewart
Sean Maitland	14	David Smith
Casey Laulala	13	Alapati Leuia
Tim Bateman	12	Shaun Treeby
Tu Umaga-Marshall	11	Hosea Gear
Stephen Brett	10	Piri Weepu
Tyson Keats	9	Alby Mathewson
Nasi Manu	8	Mathew Luamanu
George Whitelock (c)	7	Serge Lilo
Michael Paterson	6	Victor Vito
Isaac Ross	5	Daniel Ramsey
Sam Whitelock	4	Jacob Ellison (c)
Peter Borlase	3	Anthony Perenise
Ti'i Paulo	2	Ged Robinson
Andrew Olorenshaw	1	John Schwalger
Replacements
Steve Fualau	16	Dane Coles
Rodney Ah You	17	Arden David-Perrot
Ash Parker	18	Mark Reddish
Matt Todd	19	Scott Fuglistaller
Willi Heinz	20	Fa'atonu Fili
Ryan Crotty	21	Daniel Kirkpatrick
James Paterson	22	Robbie Fruean

Canterbury made a good start with a try to Colin Slade after Wellington failed to protect the ball. Captain George Whitelock picked up the loose ball which ultimately ended up with Slade who had no one in front of him 60 metres out. Stephen Brett converted and Canterbury were 7–0 after two minutes.

After a failed penalty goal attempt by Piri Weepu, Brett had his chance after a scrum penalty and put Canterbury up 10–0 16 minutes in.

Another penalty by Brett after 29 minutes and another Weepu in the 32nd put the scores at 13–3 before Colin Slade scored his second after he was put into the gap from a pass from centre Casey Laulala. Brett missed the conversion and Canterbury went into halftime with an 18–3 lead.

Wellington were the first to score in the second half with Alapati Leuia picking off a pass from Colin Slade in the 54th minute. Weepu converted and Wellington reduced the margin to 8. Canterbury hit back though with a try to wing Sean Maitland running onto a Brett pass 40 metres out and sprinting pass three players for his team's 3rd try. With the conversion from Brett, Canterbury were up 25–10.

After another Weepu penalty goal, Colin Slade received a yellow card in two minutes later for a professional foul. Wellington used it to their advantage and scored their second try coming from replacement Scott Fuglistaller. Weepu couldn't convert and Wellington were down by a converted try. But one last penalty goal by Brett in 78th minute put it out of reach for Wellington and Canterbury won their second provincial rugby title in as many years winning 28–20.

== Statistics ==
=== Team ===
There have been 78 points scored through 2 games of the 2009 air New Zealand Cup Finals including 9 tries. Piri Weepu, from Wellington, has scored the most with 19. Dane Coles has scored the most tries by a player with 2. There have been no disciplinary cards issued.

==== Points ====
Team	Round robin total	Semifinal		Final		Overall total
Team	Round robin total	Pts	Details	Pts	Details	Overall total
Canterbury	369	20	3 try; 1 pen; 1 con	28	3 try; 1 con; 3 pen	417
Hawke's Bay	372	3	1 pen	did not qualify		375
Southland	260	21	3 try; 3 con	did not qualify		281
Wellington	362	34	3 try; 5 pen; 2 con	20	2 try; 2 con; 2 pen	416

==== Tries ====
Team	Round robin total	Semifinal	Final	Overall total
Canterbury	40	3	3	46
Hawke's Bay	40	0	did not qualify	40
Southland	28	3	did not qualify	31
Wellington	40	3	2	45

==== Disciplinary cards ====
Team	Round robin total	Semifinal	Final	Overall total
Canterbury	1	0	1	2
Hawke's Bay	4	0	did not qualify	4
Southland	1	0	did not qualify	0
Wellington	3	0	0	3

=== Player ===
Piri Weepu scored the most points in the finals with 29 while Dane Coles and Colin Slade scored the most tries with 2 each.

==== Points ====
Player	Team	Round robin total	Semifinal		Final		Overall total
Player	Team	Round robin total	Points	Details	Points	Details	Overall total
Mathew Berquist	Hawke's Bay	156	3	1 pen	did not qualify		159
Robbie Robinson	Southland	111	6	3 con	did not qualify		117
Stephen Brett	Canterbury	76	10	1 try; 1 pen; 1 con	13	3 pen; 2 con	99
Sean Maitland	Canterbury	40	0		5	1 try	45
Colin Slade	Canterbury	30	0		10	2 try	40
Piri Weepu	Wellington	9	19	5 pen; 2 con	10	2 pen; 2 con	38
Kendrick Lynn	Southland	19	5	1 try	did not qualify		24
David Smith	Wellington	15	5	1 try	0		20
Jason Rutledge	Southland	15	5	1 try	did not qualify		20
Alapati Leuia	Wellington	10	0		5	1 try	15
Sam Whitelock	Canterbury	10	5	1 try	0		15
Scott Fuglistaller	Wellington	10	0		5	1 try	15
Dane Coles	Wellington	0	10	1 try	0		10
Isaac Ross	Canterbury	0	5	1 try	0		5
Scott Cowan	Southland	0	5	1 try	did not qualify		5

==== Tries ====
Player	Team	Round robin total	Semifinal	Final	Overall total
David Smith	Wellington	3	1	-	4
Jason Rutledge	Southland	3	1	did not qualify	4
Kendrick Lynn	Southland	3	1	did not qualify	4
Sam Whitelock	Canterbury	2	1	-	3
Stephen Brett	Canterbury	2	1	-	3
Dane Coles	Wellington	0	2	-	2
Isaac Ross	Canterbury	0	1	-	1
Scott Cowan	Southland	0	1	did not qualify	1

==== Goal kicking ====
Player	Team	Round robin percentage	Conversions		Pen. goals		Drop goals		Finals percentage
Player	Team	Round robin percentage	Att.	Comp.	Att.	Comp.	Att.	Comp.	Finals percentage
Mathew Berquist	Hawke's Bay	82.2%	0	0	1	1	0	0	100%
Robbie Robinson	Southland	68.3%	3	3	1	0	0	0	75.0%
Piri Weepu	Wellington	75.0%	3	2	6	5	1	0	70.0%
Stephen Brett	Canterbury	56.3%	3	1	1	0	1	0	20.0%
Colin Slade	Canterbury	61.5%	0	0	1	0	0	0	0.0%

== See also ==
- 2009 Air New Zealand Cup
- 2009 Air New Zealand Cup round robin
- 2009 Air New Zealand Cup statistics
- 2009 Air New Zealand Cup Final
