= 2009 Air New Zealand Cup final =

- Event: 2009 Air New Zealand Cup
Canterbury	Wellington
28	20
- Date: 7 November 2009
- Venue: Lancaster Park, Christchurch
- Referee: Vinny Munro

The 2009 Air New Zealand Cup Final was a rugby union match played on Saturday 7 November 2009. It was the fourth Air New Zealand Cup final to determine the winner of the 2009 Air New Zealand Cup and the 33rd winner of New Zealand's premier provincial rugby competition.

It was the last Air New Zealand Cup Final with the competition structure set to change for the 2010 season.

Canterbury were the first team to qualify for the final when they beat Hawke's Bay 20 points to 3 on 30 October. Wellington gained the second spot after beating Southland 34 points to 21 on 31 October.

== Match details ==
7 November 2009
19:35 NZDT

Canterbury	28–20	Wellington
Try: Slade (2) 2' c, 35' m Maitland 61' c Con: Brett (2); Pen: Brett (3) 17', 29', 78		Try: Leiua 54' c Fuglistaller 75' c Con: Weepu (2); Pen: Weepu (2) 32', 65'

AMI Stadium, Christchurch
Referee: Vinny Munro

Canterbury	Wellington

FB	15	Colin Slade	(yellow card) 67'
RW	14	Sean Maitland
OC	13	Casey Laulala
IC	12	Tim Bateman		(substituted off) 66'
LW	11	Tu Umaga-Marshall		(substituted off) 44'
FH	10	Stephen Brett
SH	9	Tyson Keats		(substituted off) 79'
N8	8	Nasi Manu		(substituted off) 76'
OF	7	George Whitelock (c)
BF	6	Michael Paterson
LK	5	Isaac Ross
LK	4	Sam Whitelock
TP	3	Peter Borlase
HK	2	Ti’i Paulo
LP	1	Andrew Olorenshaw
Replacements:
HK	16	Steve Fualau
PR	17	Rodney Ah You
N8	18	Ash Parker		(substituted in) 76'
LF	19	Matt Todd
SH	20	Willi Heinz		(substituted in) 79'
IC	21	Ryan Crotty		(substituted in) 66'
WG	22	James Paterson		(substituted in) 44'
Coach:
Rob Penney

FB	15	Apoua Stewart	(substituted off) 40'
RW	14	David Smith
OC	13	Alapati Leiua
IC	12	Shaun Treeby	(substituted off) 68'
LW	11	Hosea Gear
FH	10	Piri Weepu
SH	9	Alby Mathewson
N8	8	Mathew Luamanu	(substituted off) 51'
OF	7	Serge Lilo
BF	6	Victor Vito
LK	5	Daniel Ramsey	(substituted off) 51'
LK	4	Jacob Ellison (c)
TP	3	Anthony Perenise
HK	2	Ged Robinson	(substituted off) 51'
LP	1	John Schwalger
Replacements:
HK	16	Dane Coles	(substituted in) 51'
PR	17	Arden David-Perrot
LK	18	Mark Reddish	(substituted in) 51'
FL	19	Scott Fuglistaller	(substituted in) 51'
FB	20	Fa'atonu Fili	(substituted in) 40'
MF	21	Daniel Kirkpatrick
IC	22	Robert Fruean	(substituted in) 68'
Coach:
Jamie Joseph

Assistant referees:
Jonathan White
Chris Pollock
Television match official:
Keith Brown

== See also ==
- 2009 Air New Zealand Cup
- 2009 Air New Zealand Cup Finals
- 2009 Air New Zealand Cup round robin
