= Ranfurly Shield in 2009 =

New Zealand rugby union trophy

Ranfurly Shield
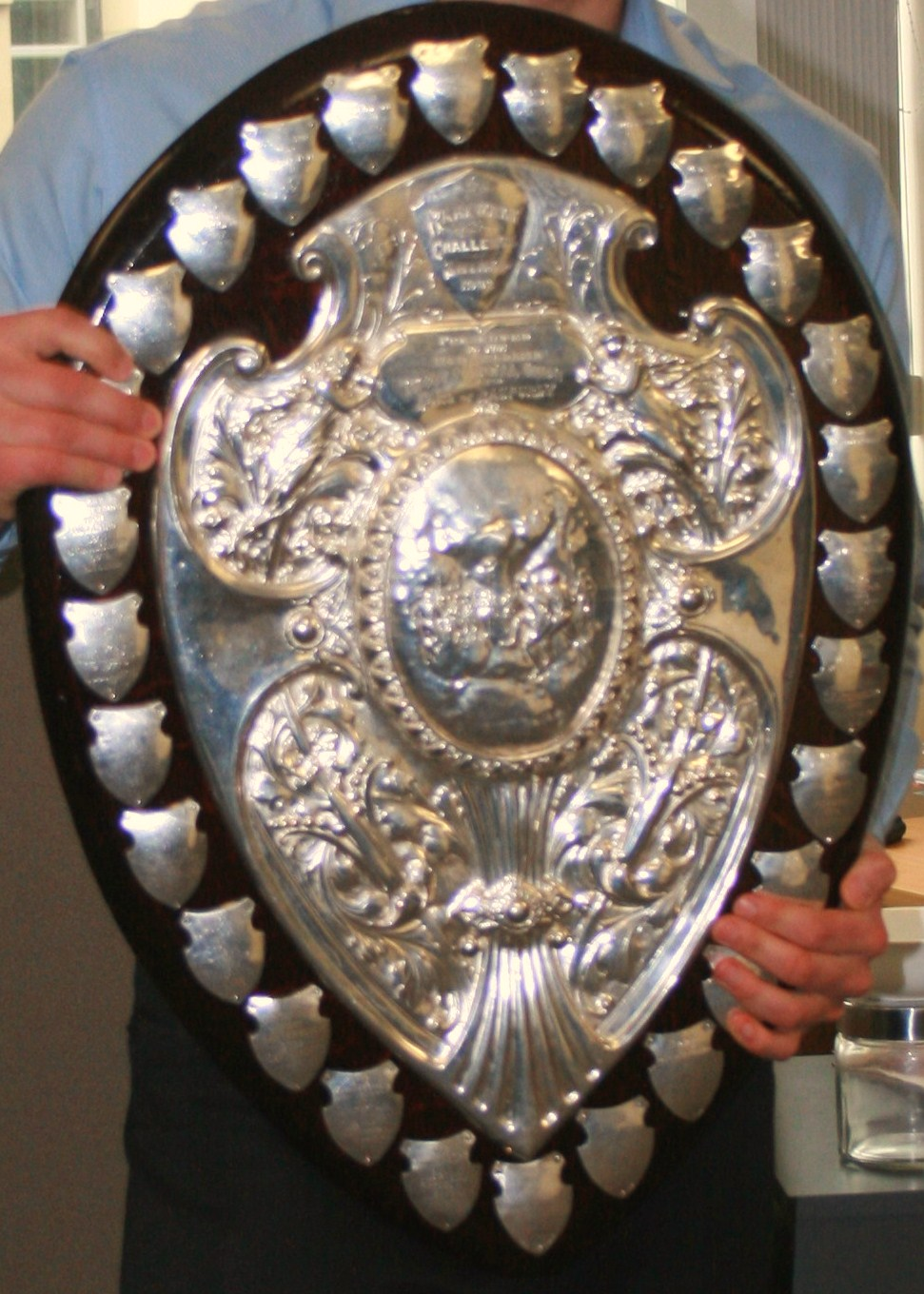
- Countries: New Zealand

Official website
- www.mitre10cup.co.nz/Competition/RanfurlyShield

Ranfurly Shield
Holders	Southland; Canterbury; Wellington
Last defence	Canterbury 3–9 Southland

The Ranfurly Shield went through 10 challenges in the 2009 season, changing hands twice, and was held by Southland at the conclusion of the season.

Wellington started off their 2009 Ranfurly Shield campaign with easy wins over Heartland teams Wairarapa Bush (90–19) and Wanganui (61–6). Wellington had their first challenge against an Air New Zealand Cup team when they defeated Otago on 31 July by 23 points to 19. Their second challenge was on 22 August against Auckland, winning 16 points to 15. Wellington's last game as owner of the shield was on 29 August, a 36–14 loss to Canterbury.

Canterbury's first challenge of the season was against southern foes Otago; they won the game on 12 September 36 points to 16. They beat Taranaki 29 points to 17 to defend it for the second time. Northland were next to challenge for the shield, but couldn't pull off the upset, losing 31–21. Canterbury's fourth challenge of the season was won comfortably 50 points to 26. In their fifth and final challenge of the season, Canterbury lost the Ranfurly Shield to Southland on 22 October 9 points to 3. Southland would not have their first challenge until the following year.

== Fixtures ==
Date	Holder	Score	Challenger	Venue	Attendance
2 July	Wellington	90–19	Wairarapa Bush	Memorial Park, Masterton	5,000
9 July	Wellington	61–6	Wanganui	Cook's Gardens, Wanganui	unknown
31 July	Wellington	23–19	Otago	Wellington Regional Stadium, Wellington	11,261
22 August	Wellington	16–15	Auckland	Wellington Regional Stadium, Wellington	13,466
29 August	Wellington	14–36	Canterbury	Wellington Regional Stadium, Wellington	18,511
12 September	Canterbury	36–16	Otago	AMI Stadium, Christchurch	16,500
18 September	Canterbury	29–17	Taranaki	AMI Stadium, Christchurch	8,800
26 September	Canterbury	31–21	Northland	AMI Stadium, Christchurch	unknown
9 October	Canterbury	50–26	Manawatu	AMI Stadium, Christchurch	unknown
22 October	Canterbury	3–9	Southland	AMI Stadium, Christchurch	10,500

== Wellington ==
Wellington were the holders coming into 2009 after they won it off Auckland in round 8 of the 2008 Air New Zealand Cup. Their first two challenges were against two Heartland teams. The first against Wairarapa Bush on 2 July, which they won 90 points to 19. Their second was against Wanganui on 9 July which they also won 61 to 6. Otago was the first Air New Zealand Cup team to challenge in 2009 when it came in round 1 of the 2009 Air New Zealand Cup. Wellington successfully defended the shield against Otago when they beat them 23 points to 19 on 31 July. Auckland were Wellingtons second challenge of the 2009 Air NZ Cup, they played them in round 4 and won 16–15 at Wellington Regional Stadium on 22 August. A week later Wellington played their 3rd Air New Zealand Cup challenge and 5th overall in 2009 against Canterbury, after the challengers established a 26–0 lead at halftime, it was too much for Wellington to regain the lead and their Ranfurly Shield tenure with 5 successful challenges, the longest time they've held onto the shield since 1953.

=== vs. Wairarapa Bush ===
2 July 2009
15:05 ^{NZST}

Wairarapa Bush	19–90	Wellington (holders)
Try: Duncan Law, Joe Feast, Nick Olson; Con: Byron Karaitiana (2)		Try: Anthony Bradshaw (2), Jason Woodward (2), David Smith (2), Mark Reddish, Chris Middleton, Matthew Luamanu, Api Naikatini, Scott Fuglistaller, Marika Kau, Charlie Ngatai; Con: Fa'atonu Fili (9); Daniel Kirkpatrick (2); Pen: Fa'atonu Fili

Memorial Park, Masterton
Attendance: 5,000
Referee: Josh Noonan

Wellington named a relatively young team with only David Smith having Super Rugby experience in the starting XV, and 22-year-old Scott Fuglistaller named captain. Wairarapa Bush were a semi-finalist in the Lochore Cup section of the Heartland Championship from the 2008 season.

Wellington scored in the first three minutes to start off with a converted try, a penalty three minutes later put the scores to 10–0. Tries by Jason Woodward and Mark Reddish put the Lions up 24–0 fifteen minutes in. Wairarapa Bush were out muscled most of the first half, with Wellington working well in the rucks and rolling mauls. With Wellington up 45–0 Wairarapa Bush were awarded a scrum five metres from the line and took advantage with a try to Duncan Law, it was converted by Byron Karaitiana. Wellington went into the half-time break with a 45–7 lead.

The Lions brought up their half century with a try to Matthew Luamanu two minutes into the second half. With Api Naikatini scoring from a twenty-metre run, Jason Woodward bringing up his second and Fa'atonu Fili shooting his 8th conversion, Wellington were up 64–7 ten minutes through the second spell. David Smith scored his second try in the 55th minute to bring Wellington up to 71 points. Wairarapa Bush gained some momentum halfway through the second with some hard runs and big hits, and it showed after a Scott Fuglistaller try, a slow kick by Daniel Kirkpatrick gave the chance for the Bush to charge down and they capitalized with a try to Joe Feast in the 65th minute. Wellington brought up 90 points with tries to Marika Kau and Charlie Ngatai. A length of the field intercept try by Nick Olson in the 74th minute was the highlight of the second half for Wairarapa Bush.

=== vs. Wanganui ===
9 July 2009
15:05 ^{NZST}

Wanganui	6–61	Wellington (holders)
Pen: Denning Tyrell (2)		Try: Alipate Leiua (2), Daniel Kirkpatrick, David Smith, Charlie Ngatai, Shaun Treeby, Frae Wilson, Brendon Watt; Con: Kirkpatrick (3), Fa'atonu Fili (3); Pen: Kirkpatrick (3)

Cook's Garden, Wanganui
Referee: Ben Skeen

Wanganui were the reigning Heartland championship Meads Cup champions. Wellington named a more experienced side with five players with Super 14 experience but the core of team is made up of club and academy players.

The score was 9–0 fifteen minutes in, with Wanganui keeping Wellington on the backfoot but were burdened by errors and turnovers on attack. Penalties were a regular feature through the first fifteen minutes with 4 by the "Butcher Boys". The first try was scored by Alipate Leiua in the 20th minute, Daniel Kirkpatrick converted from the sideline with his fourth of the day. Wellington handling errors were the only thing stopping them from extending their lead, they had the speed which was an evident factor on offense and defense with Wanganui hesitating to take the gap. In the 25th minute, Daniel Kirkpatrick scored and converted to take its points tally to 18. Wanganui's first points came in the 32nd minute with a penalty by halfback Denning Tyrell, this was the only points by Wanganui and Wellington went into the break with a 23–3 lead.

Wanganui came out firing with immediately getting and keeping the ball down in the Wellington twenty-two. Wanganui maintained the pressure and were rewarded a penalty in front of the posts, Denning Tyrell converted the penalty and put Wanganui up to six points. Frustration was setting into the Wellington Lions, continuing to make fundamental errors. Kirkpatrick missed his first for the day with a penalty veering off to the left. Wellington extended their lead to 42 points with tries to David Smith, Charlie Ngatai and Shaun Treeby, and conversions by Kirkpatrick and replacement Fa'atonu Fili. With the score 54–6, Brendon Watt finished off the scoring with a converted try to end the match, 61–6.

=== vs. Otago ===
31 July 2009
19:35 ^{NZST}

Wellington (holders)	23–19	Otago
Try: Daniel Ramsay, Hosea Gear; Con: Fa'atonu Fili (2); Pen: Daniel Kirkpatrick (2); Drop: Fa'atonu Fili		Try: Chris Noakes, Adam Thomson; Pen: Chris Noakes (3)

Wellington Regional Stadium, Wellington
Attendance: 11,261
Referee: Vinny Munro

Wellington beat Otago on 31 July to retain the Shield for another two weeks before they take on Auckland.

After two early penalties by both teams, first five Chris Noakes scored a try after a pass went off the knee of his fellow player and rolled into the endzone before being forced by Noakes. Another penalty 4 minutes later for Otago gave them an 11–3 advantage going into the halftime break.

9 minutes into the second half the Wellington Lions scored three more points with Daniel Kirkpatrick kicking his second penalty of the night. After 14 minutes and another penalty by Noakes, Shaun Treeby made a break from an Otago error and ran 40 metres before offloading to Lock Daniel Ramsey for the try under the posts. Replacement Fa'atonu Fili converted the try and put the scores to 13–14 to Otago. Five minutes later Wellington were being pressured in their 22 before Victor Vito stole the ball in the ruck and Robert Fruean made a break which ended up getting the Lions down into the southerners half, from there Fa'atonu Fili flicked it out to Hosea Gear who sped around his opposite number Karne Hesketh for a try in the corner, Fili converted the try from the sideline and put the scores up to 20–14, the first Wellington led in the game. A drop goal a minute later by Fili meant that Otago had to score a twice, once a try, to gain the lead; that try came in the 79th minute by Adam Thomson but was two late for his team with the full-time siren going off before the conversion, which was missed, that left the end score 23–19.

=== vs. Auckland ===
22 August 2009
18:35 ^{NZST}

Wellington (holders)	16–15	Auckland
Try: Hosea Gear, John Schwalger; Pen: Fa'atonu Fili; Drop: Fa'atonu Fili		Try: Daniel Bowden, Taniela Moa; Con: Daniel Bowden; Pen: Ash Moeke

Wellington Regional Stadium, Wellington
Attendance: 13,466
Referee: Chris Pollock

Wellington came into the game 6th on the season points table while Auckland came in 10th after losing 2 of their first 3 games. Auckland were seeking for revenge after the previous season where Wellington won the shield of Auckland in round 8, 27–0, it was the first time ever that Auckland had been held scoreless at Eden Park.

Wing Hosea Gear opened up scoring with a try in the 5th minute off a pass by flank Mark Reddish, Fa'atonu Fili could not convert. Ash Moeke put Aucklands first points on the board with a penalty in the 11th minute. Fa'atonu Fili added three points 2 minutes later from half way. Ash Moeke had a chance to reduce the deficit to 2 but could not pull the kick left from the awarded penalty. Attacking rugby was played by both but no team could convert that momentum into points with stoppages and unforced errors dominating the first half. Fa'atonu Fili appeared to score a try but referee Pollock said that he was obstructed didn't see anything and also that his assistant referees didn't see anything, but television replays obviously showed Fili grounding the ball. No team scored during the rest of the half and Wellington went into the sheds with 8–3 lead.

Prop John Schwalger scored the first try of the second half, and his career three minutes in, from some good open passing play from the Wellingtonians, going from one side of the field to the other three times during the movement, Fa'atonu Fili could not convert the sideline kick. Auckland struck back with replacement Daniel Bowden scoring a try 10 minutes into the second half, he couldn't convert his own try though which made the scores 13–8 to Wellington. Daniel Bowden a chance at a three pointer 2 minutes later but the kick bounced off the posts and Wellington cleared with a punt downfield. Fili landed a drop kick from thirty minutes outs in the 61st minute to increase their Wellingtons lead to 8. Daniel Bowden had a chance for another 3 pointer but didn't have the accuracy. 67 minutes in, Auckland had the chance to get a try from the 22 drop out, but was butchered by a deflected kick off a Wellington player. But Auckland made up for it later by replacement halfback Taniela Moa in the 70th minute, Daniel Bowden conversion was successful. Auckland had another chance 2 minutes later but obstruction was called over the try line to keep Wellingtons lead at 16–15. Pressure was applied by Auckland till the end of the match but Wellington were able to hold on to take the win and retain the shield at a scoreline of 16–15.

=== vs. Canterbury ===
29 August 2009
19:35 ^{NZST}

Wellington (holders)	14–36	Canterbury
Try: Hosea Gear, Ma'a Nonu; Con: Fa'atonu Fili (2)		Try: George Whitelock, Tim Bateman, Corey Flynn; Con: Daniel Carter (3); Pen: Daniel Carter (5)

Wellington Regional Stadium, Wellington
Attendance: 18,511
Referee: Keith Brown

Wellington came into this game 4th on the Air NZ Cup points table while Canterbury were 3rd and had scored the most points out of any team in the competition so far. Both teams named all the All Blacks available to them, for Canterbury this was Daniel Carter, Richie McCaw and Brad Thorn, while Wellington had Ma'a Nonu, Cory Jane and Rodney So'oialo.

In front of 18,511 spectators, Daniel Carter opened scoring with 3 penalties in the first 16 minutes putting Canterbury out to a 9–0 lead. 3 minutes later Canterbury scored the first try of the match, which went to Captain George Whitelock, Daniel Carter converted and extended his teams lead to 16–0. Another penalty by Carter put Canterbury up 19–0 with 10 minutes left in the first half. Tim Bateman scored Canterbury's second try of the match just on halftime hooter, Carter converted and Canterbury led the Lions 26–0 going into the sheds.

Canterbury were slowed down in the second half but points tallied in the first half meant that Canterbury could cruise and rely on their defence while Wellington attempted to climb back. Daniel Carter added to his tally with a penalty in the 53rd minute of play. Replacement hooker Corey Flynn finished Canterbury's try scoring with one of his own with 20 minutes to play, Carter converted and put the scores at 36–0. Things were all Canterbury until the 74th minute when Wellington scored a length of the field try to Hosea Gear, Fa'atonu Fili converted and finally put Wellington on the board. From the following kickoff, Wellington scored their second try of the game which went to returning All Black Ma'a Nonu, Fili converted and switched the final score to 36–14, with Canterbury attaining the Ranfurly Shield for the first time since 2007 when they won it off Waikato.

== Canterbury ==
Canterbury were the current holders of the Ranfurly Shield after they won it off Wellington on 29 August and in round 5 of the 2009 Air New Zealand Cup. Their first defence was against Otago, which was their second attempt of the season, on 12 September, which they won 36 points to 16. Their second challenge was on 18 September against Taranaki at AMI Stadium, which they also won when they scored 29 points to Taranaki's 17. The third challenge of Canterbury's 2009 tenure turned up the same result as the previous two, beating Northland 31 points to 21. Manawatu were the most recent team to fall to Canterbury when on 9 October they lost 50–26. In their fifth and final challenge of the season, Canterbury lost the Ranfurly Shield to Southland on 22 October 9 points to 3. Southland will not have their first challenge until next season.

=== vs. Otago ===
12 September 2009
16:35 ^{NZST}

Canterbury (holders)	36–16	Otago
Try: Stephen Brett, Michael Paterson, Tim Bateman, Casey Laulala, Ash Parker; Con: Stephen Brett (4); Pen: Stephen Brett		Try: Keith Cameron; Con: Michael Witt; Pen: Glenn Dickson (3)

AMI Stadium, Christchurch
Attendance: 16,500
Referee: Chris Pollock

Canterbury came into this game of a loss and 3rd on the Air New Zealand Cup points table Otago also came off a loss but 7th on the points table.

Flyhalf Stephen Brett started off scoring when after some good play by his outside backs allowed him to score a try right under the posts, Brett converted and Canterbury were up 7–0. Otagos Glenn Dickson narrowed gap with two penalties after 20 minutes of play. Canterbury were awarded a penalty from a scrum forced by Otago by placing the ball in their own endzone, Canterbury opted for the lineout rather than the points, which was the right call, they lost the lineout but when Otago attempted to clear, Michale Paterson charged down Glenn Dickson's kick and leaped on it to score the try, Brett could not convert, and with Dickson landing another penalty put the scores to 12 points to 9. Brett finished the scoring in the first half with a 40-metre penalty and Canterbury went into the locker room with a 6-point advantage.

After the break Canterbury were awarded an attacking inside the Otago 22, from the lineout Stephen Brett provided centre Tim Bateman with a nice pop pass, Bateman went through the gap and was too strong for Otago, Brett converted the try and put the scores to 22 points to 9. It was Otago's turn this time with a lineout in Canterbury's 22, from there they drove a nice maul all the way and replacement prop Keith Cameron dived over for Otago's only try, Michael Witt converted and Otago put the deficit to 6 points with 22 points to 16 in Canterbury's advantage. In the 63rd minute after a nice set play of a scrum by Canterbury, they ended up in Otago's 22, they spread it wide and Casey Laulala straightened up and scored Canterbury's 4th try of the evening, Brett converted and Canterbury retained their 13 points advantage. After some static play Canterbury finished off scoring with a try to No. 8 Ash Parker on full-time, Brett converted and locked the final score at 36–16 and Canterbury with their first successful shield defense.

=== vs. Taranaki ===
18 September 2009
19:35 ^{NZST}

Canterbury (holders)	29–17	Taranaki
Try: Sean Maitland (2), Tu Umaga-Marshall, James Paterson; Con: Stephen Brett (3); Pen: Stephen Brett		Try: Shayne Austin; Pen: Willie Ripia (4)

AMI Stadium, Christchurch
Attendance: 8,800
Referee: Jonathan White

Canterbury came into this match 1st equal on the Air New Zealand Cup points table while Taranaki came in 7th.

Canterbury started off scoring early on with set piece move to set up wing-cum-fullback Sean Maitland, Stephen Brett converted and put Canterbury out to a 7–0 lead. Off a lineout mistake by Canterbury allowed Taranaki flanker John Willis to provide his team with the ball, Taranaki sped it wide and an overlap allowed wing Shayne Austin to score unopposed, Willie Ripai couldn't convert and let Canterbury have a 2-point lead 12 minutes in. A penalty kick by Willie Ripia gave Taranaki the lead, but immediately after, from the kick-off Canterbury scored a try, after recovering the ball a chip kick over the top that was chased by James Paterson allowed Tu Umaga-Marshall to score off the offload, Brett converted and put Canterbury's lead to 14 points to 8. Two Ripia penalties equaled the scores when the teams went in for halftime.

Canterbury started off scoring in the second spell with a penalty to Stephen Brett, that put Canterbury out with 3-point lead. Two minutes later Canterbury scored their third try, a fine break by Maitland ending in a try to wing James Paterson and putting Canterbury out to 24 points to 14 after the conversion by Brett. Another Ripia penalty 50 minutes in put Taranaki up to 17 points. A set move by Canterbury ended up with Stephen Brett getting the wrap around and putting a grubber kick through for Sean Maitland to score his second, Canterbury were up 29–17 and other than an intercept by Shayne Austin, who was eventually caught by Brett, there were no other scoring opportunities and Canterbury ended the game with their second successful Shield challenge of the year.

=== vs. Northland ===
26 September 2009
19:35 ^{NZST}

Canterbury (holders)	31–21	Northland
Try: Sean Maitland (2), Sam Whitelock; Con: Stephen Brett (2); Pen: Stephen Brett (3); Drop: Stephen Brett		Try: Joel McKenty (2); Con: Lachie Munro; Pen: Lachie Munro (3)

AMI Stadium, Christchurch
Referee: Bryce Lawrence

Canterbury came into the competition first on the points table while Northland came in from the bottom four.

Canterbury started off scoring with a cross kick from right to left with lock Sam Whitelock catching the air ball uncontested and provided Canterbury with the 5 nil lead. Brett was successful with sideline conversion and Canterbury were up by 7, seven minutes into the game. Lachie Munro put Northland on the board when, after a scrum penalty, he kicked the three points to decrease the deficit to 4. A dangerous by flanker Joel McKenty reversed a penalty, and Stephen Brett converted the three points and cancelled out Northlands earlier three-pointer. Another penalty by Brett lengthened Canterbury's lead to 10. But from the kickoff Northland executed some nice sweeping moves and 10 metres from the line Jole McKenty ran a good angle to cut through the defensive line and was to strong for the Canterbury sweepers. Lachie Munro added the conversion and Canterbury saw their lead reduce to 3. With another penalty to Canterbury and the scores at 16–10, Northland gained an attacking lineout five metres out from Canterbury's goalline. After the ball was taken, McKenty came around towards the sideline and received the ball; after a dummy he scored his second of the match. Munro couldn't convert and the teams went into halftime and the scoreboard reading 16–15 to Canterbury.

Northland were found asleep in the first minute of the second half; Sean Maitland saw the gap and after throwing the quick throw in to Colin Slade, received the ball back after a draw and pass and scored in the corner. The conversion was unsuccessful and Canterbury were up 21–15. Two minutes later, Munro kicked another penalty and reduced his teams differential to 3. Another penalty in the 59th minute by Munro drew the score at 21 all. Sean Maitland scored his second when an overlap on the right side was utilised and he ran around to score under posts. With the conversion successful, Canterbury were up 28 points to 21. No team looked like scoring for the rest of the game, except for a Stephen Brett dropped goal. And that was the final scoring play of the game with Canterbury winning, 31–21.

=== vs. Manawatu ===
9 October 2009
19:35 ^{NZDT}

Canterbury (holders)	50–26	Manawatu
Try: Kieran Read (2), Andy Ellis, Colin Slade, Corey Flynn, Daniel Carter, Sam Whitelock, Tu Umaga-Marshall; Con: Stephen Brett (5)		Try: James Goode (2); Aaron James, Tevita Taufui; Con: Isaac Thompson (3)

AMI Stadium, Christchurch
Referee: Garratt Williamson

Canterbury came in first on the Air New Zealand Cup points table while Manawatu came in 11th.

Manawatu started scoring two minutes in when young five-eighth Aaron Cruden made a break through the middle and feed wing Aaron James the ball on the cut, James was uncontested on his way to the tryline and Manawatu were up 7–0. But it was all Canterbury after that with the first of four tries in the first 17 minutes going to returning All Black Kieran Read after some nice openfield running by Andy Ellis. Another to Read and one each to winger Tu Umaga-Marshall and lock Sam Whitelock brought Canterbury back to a 26–7 lead. A Canterbury try by Corey Flynn and another by Manawatu's James Goode brought the scores to 33–12 at halftime.

Andy Ellis scored six minutes after the break from a nice break by Ryan Crotty and then another try by James Goode from charge down from an attempted Stephen Brett clearance put the scores to 40 points to 19 and Canterbury looking like winning their fourth Shield challenge. Two tries to Colin Slade and Daniel Carter of Canterbury, and one by Manawatu's Tevita Taufuʻi finished off the scoring and Canterbury left with another shield challenge under their belt with the scoreline of 50 points to 26.

=== vs. Southland ===
22 October 2009
19:35 ^{NZDT}

Canterbury (holders)	3–9	Southland
DG: Stephen Brett		Pen: Robbie Robinson (3)

AMI Stadium, Christchurch
Attendance: 10,500

In their fifth and final challenge of the season, Canterbury lost the Ranfurly Shield to Southland on 22 October 9 points to 3. Southland did not have to defend the shield until the 2010 season.
