= 2009 New Zealand Women's Rugby Competition =

2009 NZ Women's Competition
Champions	Auckland
- Round-Robin
Duration	22 August - 19 September
Matches played	15
- Semi-finals
Date	26 September
Matches played	2
- Grand Final
Date	3 October
- Score
Auckland	Canterbury
24	20

The 2009 New Zealand Women's Rugby Competition was a provincial rugby competition, that was played between six women's rugby teams representing 6 different regions of New Zealand. There was a 5-week round-robin running from 22 August to 19 September followed by two semi-finals on 26 September and a grand final on 3 October. The Rugby Union Bonus Points System was used to determine which teams will go on to the finals. Auckland were crowned champions for the second year in a row when they beat Canterbury 24–20.

== Standings ==
	Earned semi-final spot
	Eliminated from semi-final contention
^{1}	Earned home semi-final

The top four teams in pool play will advance to the Semi-finals.

Pos.	Team	Pld	W	D	L	PF	PA	PD	BP1	BP2	Pts
1	Canterbury^{1}	5	5	0	0	147	36	111	3	0	23
2	Auckland^{1}	5	3	1	1	143	53	90	3	1	18
3	Wellington	4	3	1	1	96	49	47	2	0	16
4	Hawke's Bay	5	2	0	3	57	127	-70	1	0	9
5	Otago	4	1	0	4	107	109	-2	1	1	6
6	Manawatu	4	0	0	4	36	194	-158	0	0	0

== Round-Robin ==
The 2009 Women's Round Robin ran from 22 August to 19 September. Each team played the other teams once with each team having 2 or 3 home games.

=== Round 1 ===
Date	Home Team	Score	Away Team	Time	Venue
22 Aug	Auckland	41 - 9	Manawatu	2:00 pm	Western Springs
22 Aug	Canterbury	31 - 5	Hawke's Bay	2:00 pm	AMI Stadium
22 Aug	Wellington	26 - 5	Otago	1:00 pm	Petone Recreation Ground

=== Round 2 ===
Date	Home Team	Score	Away Team	Time	Venue
29 Aug	Wellington	10 - 10	Auckland	2:30 pm	Petone Recreation Ground
29 Aug	Hawke's Bay	19 - 14	Otago	2:30 pm	Park Island
29 Aug	Manawatu	5 - 55	Canterbury	3:00 pm	Massey Uni Sport & Rugby Institute

=== Round 3 ===
Date	Home Team	Score	Away Team	Time	Venue
05 Sept	Auckland	47 - 0	Hawke's Bay	2:00 pm	Western Springs
05 Sept	Manawatu	12 - 29	Wellington	2:45 pm	Arena Manawatu
05 Sept	Otago	5 - 24	Canterbury	2:00 pm	University Oval or North Ground

=== Round 4 ===
Date	Home Team	Score	Away Team	Time	Venue
12 Sept	Canterbury	20 - 15	Auckland	1:00 pm	Denton Oval
12 Sept	Otago	69 - 10	Manawatu	2:00 pm	Carisbrook
12 Sept	Wellington	25 - 5	Hawke's Bay	1:00 pm	Petone Recreation Ground

=== Round 5 ===
Date	Home Team	Score	Away Team	Time	Venue
19 Sept	Auckland	30 - 14	Otago	2:35 pm	College Rifles
19 Sept	Canterbury	17 - 6	Wellington	2:00 pm	Denton Oval
19 Sept	Hawke's Bay	28 - 10	Manawatu	1:00 pm	Park Island

== Finals ==
The finals will run over two weeks with the first week being to semifinals and the grand final a week later.

=== Semifinals ===
The two semifinals were held on 26 September. Canterbury comfortably beat Hawke's Bay, 55 - 3 while Auckland beat Wellington 19 points to 3.

Date	Home Team	Score	Away Team	Time	Venue
26 Sept	Canterbury	55 - 3	Hawke's Bay	12:00 pm	AMI Stadium
26 Sept	Auckland	19 - 3	Wellington	12:30 pm	Western Springs

=== Grand Final ===
The 2009 New Zealand Women's Rugby Grand Final was played on 3 October when Canterbury who went undefeated throughout the round-robin lost to Auckland at Rugby Park in Christchurch 24–20. A time is yet to be specified.

2009 New Zealand Women's Rugby Grand Final
Date	Home team	Score	Away team	Venue
3 October	Canterbury	20 - 24	Auckland	Rugby Park, Christchurch

== See also ==
- Air New Zealand Cup
- 2009 Air New Zealand Cup
- 2009 Air New Zealand Cup Round-Robin
- Heartland Championship
- 2009 Heartland Championship
