= 2008 Air New Zealand Cup =

2008 rugby union competition

- Countries: New Zealand
- Date: 31 July – 25 October
- Champions: Canterbury
- Runners-up: Wellington
- Matches played: 77
- Attendance: 530,226 (average 6,886 per match)
- Top point scorer: Blair Stewart (105)
- Top try scorer: Hosea Gear (14)

The 2008 National Provincial Championship was the third season of the National Provincial Championship (known as the Air New Zealand Cup for sponsorship reasons), a provincial rugby union competition involving 14 teams from New Zealand, since it was reorganised in 2006. Matches started on 31 July 2008, and continued until the final on 25 October 2008.

This season was the third of the expanded competition, which succeeded the First Division of the National Provincial Championship. It started with a 10-week round robin in which each team played against all but three of the others in the competition. This was followed by a knockout playoff involving eight teams, made up of quarterfinals, semifinals and the final.

On 11 August 2008, the New Zealand Rugby Union initially announced that Tasman and Northland would both be relegated from the Air New Zealand Cup after the completion of the 2008 season. Both teams failed to meet criteria which included financial stability, population, player training and development, playing history, and administration. This decision was reversed towards the end of the 2008 season, with Tasman and Northland remaining in the competition for two more years.

Canterbury won their sixth national provincial title by defeating Wellington 7–6 at Wellington Regional Stadium, Wellington. It was the third consecutive season that Wellington have finished runners-up.

== Standings ==
Qualified for the quarterfinals

The top eight teams in pool play advanced to the quarterfinals.

	Team	Pld	W	D	L	PF	PA	PD	BP1	BP2	Pts
1	Wellington	10	9	0	1	353	161	+192	8	0	44
2	Canterbury	10	9	0	1	270	101	+169	5	1	42
3	Hawke's Bay	10	7	0	3	265	183	+82	5	1	34
4	Bay of Plenty	10	6	0	4	185	152	+33	2	3	28
5	Southland	10	6	0	4	225	249	−24	3	1	25
6	Waikato	10	4	1	5	258	235	+23	5	2	25
7	Tasman	10	4	1	5	188	200	−12	2	3	23
8	Taranaki	10	4	1	5	201	209	−8	3	2	23
9	Northland	10	4	0	6	212	227	−15	3	3	22
10	Otago	10	4	1	5	207	231	−24	2	2	22
11	Auckland	10	5	0	5	149	193	−44	2	0	22
12	North Harbour	10	3	0	7	225	285	−61	3	4	19
13	Counties Manukau	10	2	1	7	140	317	−177	1	2	13
14	Manawatu	10	1	1	8	149	283	−134	2	1	9

=== Table notes ===
- Pos = Table position
- Pld = Played
- W = Win (worth 4 points)
- D = Draw (worth 2 points)
- L = Loss (worth 0 points)
- PF = For (total points scored)
- PA = Against (total points scored against)
- PD = Points difference
- BP1 = Try bonus point (1 bonus point was awarded to any team that scores four tries or more regardless of win/loss/draw)
- BP2 = Losing bonus point (1 bonus point was awarded to the losing side if the loss was by 7 points or less)
- Pts = Progressive points tally

NB:

- It is possible to receive 2 bonus points in a loss.
- In the event of a tie on points the ranking of teams is decided by:
1. The winner of the last match between the two provinces if played this season then,
2. Highest points differential then,
3. Most tries scored then,
4. A coin toss.

== Results ==
=== Round 1 ===
Home	Score	Away	Match information		
Home	Score	Away	Date	Venue	Attendance
Northland	18–10	Waikato	31 July 2008	Homeworld Stadium, Whangārei	3,000
Tasman (1 BP)	7–8	Bay of Plenty	31 July 2008	Lansdowne Park, Blenheim	2,500
Wellington (1 BP)	30–6	Hawke's Bay	1 August 2008	Wellington Regional Stadium, Wellington	7,148
Taranaki	20–13	North Harbour (1 BP)	1 August 2008	Yarrow Stadium, New Plymouth	6,300
Canterbury (1 BP)	24–25	Manawatu	2 August 2008	Lancaster Park, Christchurch	7,500
Southland (1 BP)	23–25	Otago	2 August 2008	Rugby Park Stadium, Invercargill	7,500
Counties-Manukau	17–6	Auckland	3 August 2008	Growers Stadium, Pukekohe	6,500

=== Round 2 ===
Home	Score	Away	Match information		
Home	Score	Away	Date	Venue	Attendance
North Harbour (1 BP)	27–30	Wellington (1 BP)	7 August 2008	North Harbour Stadium, Albany	3,500
Manawatu	5–18	Southland	8 August 2008	FMG Stadium, Palmerston North	7,000
Waikato (1 BP)	14–16	Tasman	8 August 2008	Waikato Stadium, Hamilton	7,100
Otago (1 BP)	13–20	Canterbury	9 August 2008	Carisbrook, Dunedin	5,000
Bay of Plenty (1 BP)	45–3	Counties-Manukau	9 August 2008	International Stadium, Rotorua	6,300
Hawke's Bay (1 BP)	43–31	Northland	9 August 2008	McLean Park, Napier	4,000
Auckland	(RS) 22–6	Taranaki	10 August 2008	Eden Park, Auckland	9,500

=== Round 3 ===
Home	Score	Away	Match information		
Home	Score	Away	Date	Venue	Attendance
Manawatu (1 BP)	38–38	Waikato (1 BP)	14 August 2008	FMG Stadium, Palmerston North	4,000
Otago	23–18	Northland (1 BP)	15 August 2008	Carisbrook, Dunedin	3,500
Wellington (1 BP)	64–7	Counties-Manukau	15 August 2008	Wellington Regional Stadium, Wellington	6,260
Bay of Plenty (1 BP)	38–31	North Harbour (2 BP)	16 August 2008	Baypark Stadium, Tauranga	9,200
Hawke's Bay (1 BP)	16–20	Southland	16 August 2008	McLean Park, Napier	5,600
Canterbury (1 BP)	34–3	Auckland	16 August 2008	Lancaster Park, Christchurch	9,000
Tasman	33–23	Taranaki	17 August 2008	Trafalgar Park, Nelson	5,600

=== Round 4 ===
Home	Score	Away	Match information		
Home	Score	Away	Date	Venue	Attendance
Counties-Manukau	8–22	Otago	21 August 2008	Mount Smart Stadium, Auckland	1,000
Northland (1 BP)	10–15	Bay of Plenty	22 August 2008	Homeworld Stadium, Whangārei	14,200
Southland	7–26	Wellington (1 BP)	22 August 2008	Rugby Park Stadium, Invercargill	7,500
Auckland	(RS) 25–3	Manawatu	23 August 2008	Eden Park, Auckland	7,500
Tasman	6–41	Hawke's Bay (1 BP)	23 August 2008	Lansdowne Park, Blenheim	3,500
Taranaki	0–14	Canterbury	23 August 2008	Yarrow Stadium, New Plymouth	6,400
North Harbour	15–10	Waikato (1 BP)	24 August 2008	North Harbour Stadium, Albany	3,800

=== Round 5 ===
Home	Score	Away	Match information		
Home	Score	Away	Date	Venue	Attendance
Southland (1 BP)	31–8	Counties-Manukau	28 August 2008	Rugby Park Stadium, Invercargill	7,000
Taranaki (1 BP)	39–21	Northland	29 August 2008	Yarrow Stadium, New Plymouth	4,000
Otago	10–19	Hawke's Bay	29 August 2008	Carisbrook, Dunedin	4,500
Wellington (1 BP)	48–12	Bay of Plenty	30 August 2008	Wellington Regional Stadium, Wellington	15,242
Manawatu (1 BP)	17–20	North Harbour	30 August 2008	FMG Stadium, Palmerston North	7,000
Waikato (1 BP)	34–13	Auckland	30 August 2008	Waikato Stadium, Hamilton	9,500
Canterbury (1 BP)	44–15	Tasman	31 August 2008	Lancaster Park, Christchurch	8,000

=== Round 6 ===
Home	Score	Away	Match information		
Home	Score	Away	Date	Venue	Attendance
Hawke's Bay	18–14	Taranaki (1 BP)	4 September 2008	McLean Park, Napier	6,300
Bay of Plenty (1 BP)	31–20	Otago	5 September 2008	Baypark Stadium, Tauranga	13,500
Manawatu	13–36	Wellington (1 BP)	5 September 2008	FMG Stadium, Palmerston North	8,000
Auckland	(RS) 13–9	Southland	6 September 2008	Eden Park, Auckland	7,500
Northland	10–31	Tasman (1BP)	6 September 2008	Homeworld Stadium, Whangārei	6,000
North Harbour	9–36	Canterbury (1BP)	6 September 2008	North Harbour Stadium, Albany	3,900
Waikato	20–15	Counties-Manukau (1 BP)	7 September 2008	Waikato Stadium, Hamilton	12,000

=== Round 7 ===
Home	Score	Away	Match information		
Home	Score	Away	Date	Venue	Attendance
Taranaki	14–3	Manawatu	11 September 2008	Yarrow Stadium, New Plymouth	4,800
Bay of Plenty (1 BP)	20–25	Auckland	12 September 2008	International Stadium, Rotorua	8,000
Northland (1 BP)	3–5	Canterbury	12 September 2008	Homeworld Stadium, Whangārei	4,200
Tasman	21–21	Otago	13 September 2008	Trafalgar Park, Nelson	6,700
Southland (1BP)	43–7	North Harbour	13 September 2008	Rugby Park Stadium, Invercargill	6,482
Wellington (1BP)	45–33	Waikato (1 BP)	13 September 2008	Wellington Regional Stadium, Wellington	13,122
Counties-Manukau	14–45	Hawke's Bay (1 BP)	14 September 2008	Growers Stadium, Pukekohe	4,850

=== Round 8 ===
Home	Score	Away	Match information		
Home	Score	Away	Date	Venue	Attendance
Canterbury (1 BP)	37–20	Bay of Plenty	18 September 2008	Lancaster Park, Christchurch	9,500
Tasman (1 BP)	3–6	Southland	19 September 2008	Lansdowne Park, Blenheim	4,500
Otago (2BP)	27–31	Taranaki (1BP)	19 September 2008	Carisbrook, Dunedin	2,000
Counties-Manukau (1BP)	27–14	Manawatu	20 September 2008	Growers Stadium, Pukekohe	3,700
Hawke's Bay (1BP)	24–15	Waikato	20 September 2008	McLean Park, Napier	7,800
Auckland	(RS) 0–27	Wellington (1BP)	20 September 2008	Eden Park, Auckland	16,000
North Harbour (1BP)	24–35	Northland (1BP)	21 September 2008	North Harbour Stadium, Albany	2,500

=== Round 9 ===
Home	Score	Away	Match information		
Home	Score	Away	Date	Venue	Attendance
Bay of Plenty	24–22	Southland (1BP)	25 September 2008	Baypark Stadium, Tauranga	8,100
Waikato (1 BP)	39–10	Otago	26 September 2008	Waikato Stadium, Hamilton	8,500
Taranaki	13–13	Counties-Manukau	26 September 2008	Yarrow Stadium, New Plymouth	6,500
North Harbour (1BP)	22–29	Auckland (1BP)	27 September 2008	North Harbour Stadium, Albany	5,700
Wellington	(RS) 26–20	Tasman (1BP)	27 September 2008	Wellington Regional Stadium, Wellington	14,143
Canterbury (1BP)	31–7	Hawke's Bay	27 September 2008	Lancaster Park, Christchurch	10,065
Northland (1 BP)	45–24	Manawatu (1 BP)	28 September 2008	Homeworld Stadium, Whangārei	4,200

=== Round 10 ===
Home	Score	Away	Match information		
Home	Score	Away	Date	Venue	Attendance
Waikato (1BP)	45–41	Taranaki (2BP)	2 October 2008	Waikato Stadium, Hamilton	8,500
Southland	6–25	Canterbury	3 October 2008	Rugby Park Stadium, Invercargill	9,000
Hawke's Bay (1BP)	46–12	Bay of Plenty	3 October 2008	McLean Park, Napier	7,327
Manawatu	7–36	Tasman (1BP)	4 October 2008	FMG Stadium, Palmerston North	5,000
Counties-Manukau (1BP)	28–57	North Harbour (1 BP)	4 October 2008 (1BP)	Mount Smart Stadium, Auckland	800
Otago (1BP)	36–21	Wellington	4 October 2008	Carisbrook, Dunedin	3,500
Auckland	13–21	Northland	5 October 2008	Eden Park, Auckland	6,540

== Knockout stage ==
Quarter-finals
10 October – Christchurch
Canterbury	48
Tasman	10
12 October – Napier
Hawke's Bay	31
Waikato	28
11 October – Wellington
Wellington	50
Taranaki	30
11 October – Tauranga
Bay of Plenty	11
Southland	45

Semi-finals
18 October – Christchurch
Canterbury	31
Hawke's Bay	21
17 October – Wellington
Wellington	28
Southland	19

Final
25 October – Wellington
Canterbury	7
Wellington	6

=== Quarterfinals ===
Home	Score	Away	Match information		
Home	Score	Away	Date	Venue	Attendance
Canterbury	48–10	Tasman	10 October 2008	Lancaster Park, Christchurch	7,500
Wellington	50–30	Taranaki	11 October 2008	Wellington Regional Stadium, Wellington	13,164
Bay of Plenty	11–45	Southland	11 October 2008	Baypark Stadium, Tauranga	6,800
Hawke's Bay	31–28	Waikato	12 October 2008	McLean Park, Napier	10,866

=== Semifinals ===
Home	Score	Away	Match information		
Home	Score	Away	Date	Venue	Attendance
Wellington	28–19	Southland	17 October 2008	Wellington Regional Stadium, Wellington	11,517
Canterbury	31–21	Hawke's Bay	18 October 2008	Lancaster Park, Christchurch	7,000

=== Final ===
Home	Score	Away	Match information		
Home	Score	Away	Date	Venue	Attendance
Wellington	6–7	Canterbury	25 October 2008	Wellington Regional Stadium, Wellington	21,237

== Statistics ==
=== Points scorers ===
Pos	Player	Team	Pts
1	Blair Stewart	Southland	105
2	Matt Berquist	Hawke's Bay	97
3	Mike Delany	Bay of Plenty	93
4	Willie Ripia	Taranaki	93
5	Jimmy Gopperth	North Harbour	90

=== Try scorers ===
Pos	Player	Team	Tries
1	Hosea Gear	Wellington	14
2	Zac Guildford	Hawke's Bay	8
3=	James Paterson	Canterbury	7
3=	Lote Raikabula	Manawatu	7
3=	Karne Hesketh	Otago	7
3=	Paul Perez	Taranaki	7

== See also ==
- Air New Zealand Cup
- Heartland Championship
- 2008 Heartland Championship
