= Jason Hona =

- Full name: Jason T Arepa Hona
- Born: 10 June 1986 (age 40)
- Height: 188 cm (6 ft 2 in)
- Weight: 100 kg (220 lb)
- School: Tauranga Boys' College

Rugby union career
- Position: Wing
Provincial / State sides
Years	Team	Apps	(Points)
2007–11	Bay of Plenty	43	(40)
Super Rugby
Years	Team	Apps	(Points)
2010	Chiefs	4	(0)

Jason T Arepa Hona (born 10 June 1986) is a New Zealand former professional rugby union player.

== Biography ==
Educated at Tauranga Boys' College, Hona played as a loose forward in schoolboys rugby and as a front rower for New Zealand in the IRB Sevens World Series, before being converted into a winger by his Bay of Plenty coaches.

Hona featured mostly on the left wing in his five seasons at the Bay of Plenty and was called up by the Chiefs during the 2010 Super 14 season, to replace an injured Sitiveni Sivivatu. He made his Chiefs debut off the bench against the Sharks in Durban and started three games on the left wing.

In 2013, Hona signed with French club US Bressane.
