= 2009 Air New Zealand Cup round robin =

2009 Air NZ Cup round robin
Duration	30 July to 25 October
Rounds	13
Matches played	91

The 2009 Air New Zealand Cup was a provincial rugby union competition in New Zealand, which was run as a round-robin tournament from 30 July to 25 October. There were 13 rounds where every team played each other once. The top four teams on the Air New Zealand Cup table advanced to the semi-finals, where they played for a chance in the Grand Final.

Most weeks, one game was played on Thursday at 19:35 (NZ Time), two games on Fridays both starting at 19:35, three games on Saturdays at 14:35, 17:30 and 19:35 and one game on Sundays at 14:35. Again, this is most common, there were games played at 16:30 or 18:30 and more or less games played on certain days, e.g. Thursdays and Saturdays.

== Standings ==
=== Points table ===
Pos.	Team	Pld	W	D	L	PF	PA	PD	BP1	BP2	Pts
1	Canterbury	13	10	0	3	369	231	138	4	3	47
2	Wellington	13	9	0	4	362	237	125	5	2	43
3	Southland (RS)	13	9	1	3	260	189	71	2	1	41
4	Hawke's Bay	13	8	1	4	372	256	116	6	1	41
5	Auckland	13	8	0	5	272	223	49	3	4	39
6	Waikato	13	8	0	5	285	297	-12	4	0	36
7	Bay of Plenty	13	7	0	6	268	267	1	1	3	32
8	Taranaki	13	6	1	6	252	251	1	1	1	28
9	Tasman	13	6	0	7	243	260	-17	2	2	28
10	Otago	13	5	0	8	260	283	-23	2	5	27
11	Manawatu	13	4	0	9	305	362	-57	3	5	24
12	North Harbour	13	4	0	9	244	320	-76	0	4	20
13	Northland	13	3	1	9	226	341	-115	0	2	16
14	Counties Manukau	13	2	0	11	235	436	-201	2	2	12

=== Ladder progression ===
Team	1	2	3	4	5	6	7	8	9	10	11	12	13
Auckland	14	14	10	10	7	6	8	5	7	7	6	6	5
Bay of Plenty	6	1	1	1	3	1	3	3	4	6	8	7	7
Canterbury	9	6	2	2	1	3	1	1	1	1	1	1	1
Counties Manukau	8	13	14	13	14	14	12	14	14	14	14	14	14
Hawke's Bay	1	4	7	9	8	11	7	4	3	2	2	5	4
Manawatu	2	9	6	5	4	8	9	10	11	11	12	12	11
North Harbour	7	7	12	12	13	13	14	13	12	13	10	11	12
Northland	11	5	11	7	12	12	13	11	13	12	13	13	13
Otago	10	12	8	8	6	9	10	12	10	10	11	10	10
Southland	4	2	4	3	2	2	2	2	2	5	4	3	3
Taranaki	3	10	9	11	10	7	5	8	9	9	9	9	8
Tasman	13	11	3	6	9	5	4	6	5	4	7	8	9
Waikato	12	8	13	14	11	10	11	9	8	8	5	4	6
Wellington	5	3	5	4	5	4	6	7	6	3	3	2	2

Win	Draw	Loss

== Schedule ==
Round 1	Round 2	Round 3	Round 4	Round 5	Round 6	Round 7
30 July – 2 August	6–9 August	13–16 August	20–23 August	27–30 August	3–6 September	10–13 September

Round 8	Round 9	Round 10	Round 11	Round 12	Round 13
17–20 September	24–27 September	1–4 October	8–11 October	15–18 October	22–25 October

=== Round 1 ===
- The highlight of round one was the first up Ranfurly Shield challenge when Wellington beat Otago 23–19, Otago had the chance to own the shield for the first time in 52 years.
- On Saturday, three of the major unions went down to their lesser counterparts;
  - Hawke's Bay recorded its first win over Auckland in Air New Zealand/NPC history and their first win over Auckland since 1974.
  - North Harbour recorded a shock win over defending champions Canterbury in their first game of the season, Michael Harris lead the 22–19 victory recording 17 points.
  - Southland beat Waikato 16–6, their first win over the Mooloo men since 2003.

Date	Home team	Score	Away team	Time	Venue	Attendance
30 July	Tasman	9–21	Taranaki	19:35	Lansdowne Park	
31 July	Bay of Plenty	19–14	Northland	19:35	Rotorua International Stadium	
31 July	Wellington (RS)	23–19	Otago	19:35	Westpac Stadium	
1 August	Hawke's Bay	47–13	Auckland	14:35	McLean Park	
1 August	North Harbour	22–19	Canterbury	17:30	North Harbour Stadium	
1 August	Southland	16–6	Waikato	19:35	Rugby Park Stadium	
2 August	Manawatu	36–31	Counties Manukau	14:35	FMG Stadium	

=== Round 2 ===
- Northland chose to switch their home game to North Harbour Stadium after determining that Okara Park would be unsuitable on account of bad field conditions.
- When Southland beat Otago 26–19 at Carisbrook, it was the 232nd time these two teams had matched up, the most played provincial rivalry in New Zealand rugby.
- Tasman's 19–15 victory over North Harbour on 7 August was the first time in their history that they have beaten them.

Date	Home team	Score	Away team	Time	Venue	Attendance
6 August	Northland	29–16	Taranaki	19:35	North Harbour Stadium	3,000
7 August	North Harbour	15–19	Tasman	19:35	North Harbour Stadium	6,000
7 August	Otago	19–26	Southland	19:35	Carisbrook	7,000
8 August	Waikato	30–22	Manawatu	14:35	Waikato Stadium	11,500
8 August	Hawke's Bay	13–21	Wellington	17:30	McLean Park	13,995
8 August	Auckland	16–22	Canterbury	19:35	Eden Park	10,200
9 August	Counties Manukau	9–32	Bay of Plenty	14:35	Growers Stadium	5,275

=== Round 3 ===
- When Northland ran out onto the field at the Kerikeri Domain it was the first time they have played in the province outside of Whangārei since 1976, and the first time Kerikeri have hosted an Air New Zealand/NPC match.
- Taranaki and Hawke's Bay played in the first drawn match of the season when they matched up 24-apiece at the final whistle. The game was also refereed for the first time by a referee from outside New Zealand: Nathan Pearce of Australia.
- On 16 August, Tasman and Counties Manukau played against each other for the first time in their history with Tasman winning 51–15.

Date	Home team	Score	Away team	Time	Venue	Attendance
13 August	Otago	29–9	North Harbour	19:35	Carisbrook	4,000
14 August	Southland	23–25	Manawatu	19:35	Rugby Park Stadium	7,000
14 August	Canterbury	46–13	Waikato	19:35	AMI Stadium	9,500
15 August	Northland	13–32	Auckland	14:35	Kerikeri Domain	7,000
15 August	Taranaki	24–24	Hawke's Bay	17:30	Yarrow Stadium	6,593
15 August	Bay of Plenty	21–17	Wellington	19:35	Rotorua Intl Stadium	5,000
16 August	Tasman	51–15	Counties Manukau	14:35	Trafalgar Park	4,300

=== Round 4 ===
- Wellington won their second Ranfurly Shield challenge 16–15 against Auckland on 22 August, with some significant moments,
  - it is now the longest Wellington has held onto the shield since 1953; and
  - Fa'atonu Fili landed his third drop goal of the competition, the most in any Air New Zealand Cup season, it also made Wellington the holder of the most drop goals in a season by a team with 2 being the previous record.
- When Canterbury beat Tasman 25 to 21, it was the closest that Tasman had come to winning against their Crusader counterparts.
- Counties Manukau were only team left in the competition without a win but ended that when they recorded a 33–21 win over Taranaki on 23 August.

Date	Home team	Score	Away team	Time	Venue	Attendance
20 August	Manawatu	19–12	Otago	19:35	FMG Stadium	8,000
21 August	North Harbour	23–26	Northland	19:35	North Harbour Stadium	6,500
21 August	Southland	18–9	Hawke's Bay	19:35	Rugby Park Stadium	9,200
22 August	Bay of Plenty	32–16	Waikato	14:35	Baypark Stadium	12,000
22 August	Canterbury	25–21	Tasman	16:30	AMI Stadium	9,400
22 August	Wellington (RS)	16–15	Auckland	18:35	Westpac Stadium	14,335
23 August	Counties Manukau	33–21	Taranaki	14:35	Growers Stadium	2,500

=== Round 5 ===
- Wellington lost the Ranfurly Shield in Round 5, losing 36–14 to Canterbury on 29 August.
- When Southland beat North Harbour 24–22, it was the first time Southland had beaten North Harbour at their home stadium.
- Hawke's Bay scored the first penalty try of the season in their 28–26 victory over Tasman on 28 August.
- Auckland and Bay of Plenty contested for the new trophy, the John Drake Boot, named after John Drake, who died December 2008, Auckland won the trophy by winning 29–14. This was also Bay of Plenty's first loss of the season.

Date	Home team	Score	Away team	Time	Venue	Attendance
27 August	North Harbour	22–24	Southland	19:35	North Harbour Stadium	3,500
28 August	Northland	7–29	Otago	19:35	Okara Park	4,500
28 August	Hawke's Bay	28–26	Tasman	19:35	McLean Park	8,700
29 August	Counties Manukau	8–30	Waikato	14:35	Growers Stadium	7,000
29 August	Manawatu	10–12	Taranaki	17:30	FMG Stadium	11,000
29 August	Wellington (RS)	14–36	Canterbury	19:35	Westpac Stadium	18,511
30 August	Auckland	29–14	Bay of Plenty	14:35	Eden Park	6,000

=== Round 6 ===
- Southland and Northland started off Round 6 with a draw when both teams locked up at 15–15, it was the second draw of the season.
- When Wellington beat Counties Manukau on 4 September, Hosea Gear equaled the record for most tries in one game with 4.
- The upset of the round was when Bay of Plenty beat Canterbury 19–17, right after Canterbury had won the Ranfurly Shield off Wellington.

Date	Home team	Score	Away team	Time	Venue	Attendance
3 September	Southland	15–15	Northland	19:35	Rugby Park Stadium	8,500
4 September	Taranaki	17–13	North Harbour	19:35	Yarrow Stadium	6,421
4 September	Counties Manukau	19–62	Wellington	19:35	Growers Stadium	3,500
5 September	Tasman	34–15	Manawatu	14:35	Trafalgar Park	5,500
5 September	Bay of Plenty	19–17	Canterbury	17:30	Baypark Stadium	10,000
5 September	Waikato	30–22	Hawke's Bay	19:35	Waikato Stadium	10,000
6 September	Otago	18–22	Auckland	14:35	Carisbrook	7,000

=== Round 7 ===
- Canterbury hosted their first Ranfurly Shield challenge against Otago on 12 September, which they won 36–16.
- When Tasman played Waikato on 11 September, it was officiated by Australian Andrew Lees, who was the second Australian to referee an Air New Zealand Cup match this season.
- When Taranaki beat Wellington on 10 September, it was their first NPC/Air New Zealand Cup win over Wellington in 20 years.
- When Southland beat Bay of Plenty 19–12 on 11 September, they earned the 4 competition points to gain them the top position on the points table, the first time ever Southland have achieved this in the first division of New Zealand provincial rugby.

Date	Home team	Score	Away team	Time	Venue	Attendance
10 September	Northland	21–37	Counties Manukau	19:35	Okara Park	3,000
10 September	Taranaki	29–16	Wellington	19:35	Yarrow Stadium	7,500
11 September	Tasman	23–9	Waikato	19:35	Lansdowne Park	4,000
11 September	Southland	19–12	Bay of Plenty	19:35	Rugby Park Stadium	10,500
12 September	North Harbour	17–34	Hawke's Bay	14:35	North Harbour Stadium	3,000
12 September	Canterbury (RS)	36–16	Otago	16:35	AMI Stadium	16,500
13 September	Auckland	23–20	Manawatu	14:35	Eden Park	6,200

=== Round 8 ===
- Canterbury successfully hosted their second Ranfurly Shield match of the season when they beat Taranaki 29 points to 17.
- North Harbour won the 29th edition of the Battle of the Bridge against Auckland, only the sixth time they had beaten them and the first time since 2004.

Date	Home team	Score	Away team	Time	Venue	Attendance
17 September	Bay of Plenty	24–13	Tasman	19:35	Baypark Stadium	6,700
17 September	Counties Manukau	6–14	Southland	19:35	Growers Stadium	2,000
18 September	Canterbury (RS)	29–17	Taranaki	19:35	AMI Stadium	8,800
18 September	Waikato	23–18	Wellington	19:35	Waikato Stadium	8,000
19 September	Auckland	14–16	North Harbour	14:35	Eden Park	6,520
19 September	Hawke's Bay	32–10	Otago	16:35	McLean Park	8,000
20 September	Manawatu	18–25	Northland	14:35	FMG Stadium	8,500

=== Round 9 ===
- Englishman Wayne Barnes refereed the game between Wellington and Southland, he was the third referee outside the country to referee an Air New Zealand Cup match this season.
- Canterbury successfully held their third Ranfurly Shield challenge against Northland when they beat them 31–21.
- Tasman recorded their first ever win over Auckland in their four-year history, even though it was only the second time they've played each other.

Date	Home team	Score	Away team	Time	Venue	Attendance
24 September	Wellington	32–13	Southland	19:35	Westpac Stadium	5,301
25 September	Taranaki	14–15	Waikato	19:35	Yarrow Stadium	5,564
25 September	North Harbour	28–19	Counties Manukau	19:35	North Harbour Stadium	unknown
26 September	Canterbury (RS)	31–21	Northland	14:35	AMI Stadium	unknown
26 September	Hawke's Bay	35–30	Manawatu	17:30	McLean Park	unknown
26 September	Otago	26–17	Bay of Plenty	19:35	Carisbrook	unknown
27 September	Tasman	12–8	Auckland	14:35	Trafalgar Park	8,100

=== Round 10 ===
- Counties Manukau were the first team in this year's competition to be eliminated from semi-final contention when they lost to Canterbury on 2 October.

Date	Home team	Score	Away team	Time	Venue	Attendance
1 October	Waikato	33–22	North Harbour	19:35	Waikato Stadium	8,000
2 October	Bay of Plenty	19–22	Hawke's Bay	19:35	Rotorua Intl Stadium	6,700
2 October	Counties Manukau	17–28	Canterbury	19:35	Growers Stadium	3,047
3 October	Auckland	27–13	Southland	14:35	Eden Park	6,520
3 October	Wellington	43–15	Manawatu	17:30	Westpac Stadium	8,607
3 October	Taranaki	38–10	Otago	19:35	Yarrow Stadium	7,922
4 October	Northland	16–21	Tasman	14:35	Okara Park	4,000

=== Round 11 ===
- Canterbury successfully held their fourth Ranfurly Shield challenge against Manawatu on 9 October, winning 50–26.
- Canterbury became the first team in the competition to qualify for the semi-finals with their victory over Manawatu.
- Despite sitting in 10th place immediately after their loss on 9 October, Manawatu was the second team to be eliminated from semi-final contention.
- When Hawke's Bay beat Counties Manukau 54–8, it was the largest winning margin between the two teams.
- Northland's David Holwell celebrated his 100th game for the province against his old union, Wellington on 11 October.
- Taranaki and Tasman were the first teams this season to be held scoreless, when they played Auckland and Southland on 9 and 10 October.
- Otago was eliminated from semi-final contention when they lost to Waikato. Waikato's victory also eliminated North Harbour and Northland bringing the total of eliminated teams to five.

Date	Home team	Score	Away team	Time	Venue	Attendance
8 October	Hawke's Bay	54–8	Counties Manukau	19:35	McLean Park	unknown
9 October	Canterbury (RS)	50–26	Manawatu	19:35	AMI Stadium	unknown
9 October	Taranaki	0–10	Auckland	19:35	Yarrow Stadium	unknown
10 October	Otago	29–35	Waikato	14:35	Carisbrook	unknown
10 October	Southland	41–0	Tasman	17:30	Rugby Park Stadium	unknown
10 October	North Harbour	28–7	Bay of Plenty	19:35	North Harbour Stadium	1,500
11 October	Northland	7–41	Wellington	14:35	Okara Park	unknown

=== Round 12 ===
- By defeating Hawke's Bay on 15 October, Canterbury ensured home field advantage in the semi-finals and (should they reach it) the final.
- Taranaki became the sixth team be eliminated from playoff contention when they lost to Southland on 16 October.
- Bay of Plenty became the seventh team be eliminated from playoff contention when Wellington beat North Harbour on 17 October.
- Tasman became the eighth team to be eliminated from playoff contention when they lost to Otago on 17 October. They were also held scoreless for the second straight week after losing to Southland in round 11, 41–0.
- The Wellington Lions played in specially designed white jerseys in their 17 October match against North Harbour to help raise funds and awareness for the Samoa tsunami appeal.

Date	Home team	Score	Away team	Time	Venue	Attendance
15 October	Hawke's Bay	20–27	Canterbury	19:35	McLean Park	17,000
16 October	Manawatu	27–28	Bay of Plenty	19:35	FMG Stadium	unknown
16 October	Southland	29–13	Taranaki	19:35	Rugby Park Stadium	6,000
17 October	Wellington	37–13	North Harbour	14:35	Westpac Stadium	10,160
17 October	Otago	21–0	Tasman	17:30	Carisbrook	unknown
17 October	Waikato	27–19	Northland	19:35	Waikato Stadium	unknown
18 October	Auckland	37–14	Counties Manukau	14:35	Eden Park	8,400

=== Round 13 ===
- Six teams remained in contention for the semi-finals at the beginning of the round (Canterbury, Wellington, Southland, Waikato, Hawke's Bay and Auckland); and of these only Canterbury was guaranteed a position.
- Southland obtained the Ranfurly Shield for the first time since 1959 when they beat Canterbury 9 points to 3 on 22 October. In the process, they became the second team to book themselves a place in the semi-finals.
- Wellington clinched a home semi-final after their win against Tasman on 23 October. The victory also cemented Southland as the third-place team in the round robin and as Wellington's semi-final opponent.
- Auckland was the ninth team to be eliminated from semi-final contention with Hawke's Bay victory over Northland on 23 October.
- Manawatu beat North Harbour for the first time ever, winning 42–16 on 24 October. Manawatu's Andre Taylor also equaled the record for most points scored in an Air New Zealand Cup game with 27, including 2 tries, 2 penalty goals, 4 conversions and 1 drop goal.
- Hawke's Bay won the last playoff spot and Waikato was the tenth and final team eliminated from semi-final contention when Auckland beat Waikato on 24 October.

Date	Home team	Score	Away team	Time	Venue	Attendance
22 October	Canterbury	3–9	Southland (RS)	19:35	AMI Stadium	10,500
23 October	Northland	13–32	Hawke's Bay	19:35	Okara Park	2,500
23 October	Tasman	14–22	Wellington	19:35	Lansdowne Park	5,500
24 October	Manawatu	42–16	North Harbour	14:35	FMG Stadium	7,000
24 October	Otago	22–19	Counties Manukau	17:30	Carisbrook	3,000
24 October	Waikato	18–26	Auckland	19:35	Waikato Stadium	9,800
25 October	Bay of Plenty	24–30	Taranaki	14:35	Baypark Stadium	7,100

== See also ==
- Air New Zealand Cup
- 2009 Air New Zealand Cup
