= Apoua Stewart =

- Full name: Apoua Samuel Stewart
- Born: 2 December 1979 (age 46) Wellington, New Zealand
- Height: 6 ft 3 in (191 cm)
- Weight: 198 lb (90 kg)
- Occupation: Builder

Rugby union career
- Position: Fullback / Wing
Senior career
Years	Team	Apps	(Points)
2001–02	Wellington	2	(0)
2003–05	Bay of Plenty	27	(35)
2006	Coventry	?	(?)
2009–11	Wellington	27	(25)
International career
Years	Team	Apps	(Points)
2005	Samoa	2	(0)

Apoua Samuel Stewart (born 2 December 1979) is a Samoan former rugby union international.

A native of Wellington, Stewart was a Marist St Pats product who played mainly as a fullback and winger. He made his provincial debut for Wellington in 2001, then played with Bay of Plenty from 2003 to 2005.

Stewart was capped twice by Samoa in 2005, debuting as the team's fullback in the one-off Test against Australia at Stadium Australia in Sydney. His other appearance came in Nuku'alofa against Tonga.

In 2006, Stewart joined English club Coventry and had his time at the club cut short when he tested positive for ephedrine, receiving a two-year ban by the International Rugby Board, later reduced to 18-months. He has claimed that the positive test was the result of a training supplement he had taken.

Stewart made a return to provincial rugby in 2009, playing again for Wellington.

== See also ==
- List of Samoa national rugby union players
