= Growers Stadium =

Stadium in Pukekohe, New Zealand

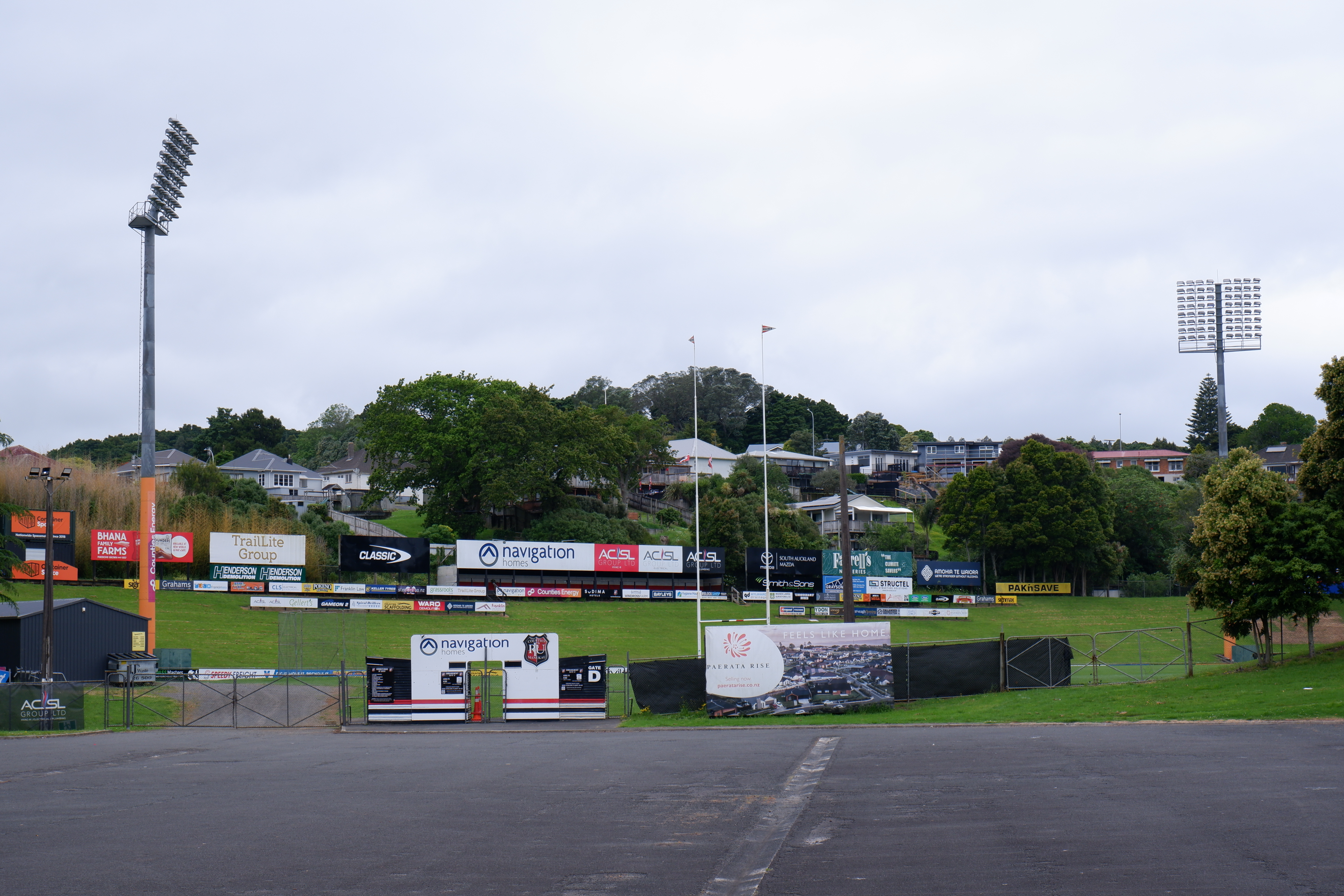
- Interactive map of Growers Stadium
- Former names: Growers Stadium; Bayer Growers Stadium; ECOlight Stadium
- Location: 2 Franklin Road, Pukekohe, Auckland, New Zealand
- Coordinates: 37°11′53.87″S 174°54′30.28″E
- Capacity: 12,000

Tenants
- Counties Manukau Rugby Union; Kagifa Samoa (2019)

Growers Stadium, officially Navigation Homes Stadium since 2018 for sponsorship reasons, is a stadium in Pukekohe, New Zealand. Its usual tenants are the Counties Manukau Rugby Union, whose first-class team compete in the National Provincial Championship.

In July 2009, Counties Manukau announced that Bayer New Zealand Ltd would be their main sponsor, and that Growers Stadium would be known as Bayer Growers Stadium for sponsorship reasons.

Later the main sponsor of the team and stadium became ECOlight, an energy efficient lighting company based in New Zealand, and the stadium became known as ECOlight Stadium.

In 2018, the stadium sponsor changed to Navigation Homes, and the name changed to its current official name.
