= Stephen Brett =

New Zealand rugby union player

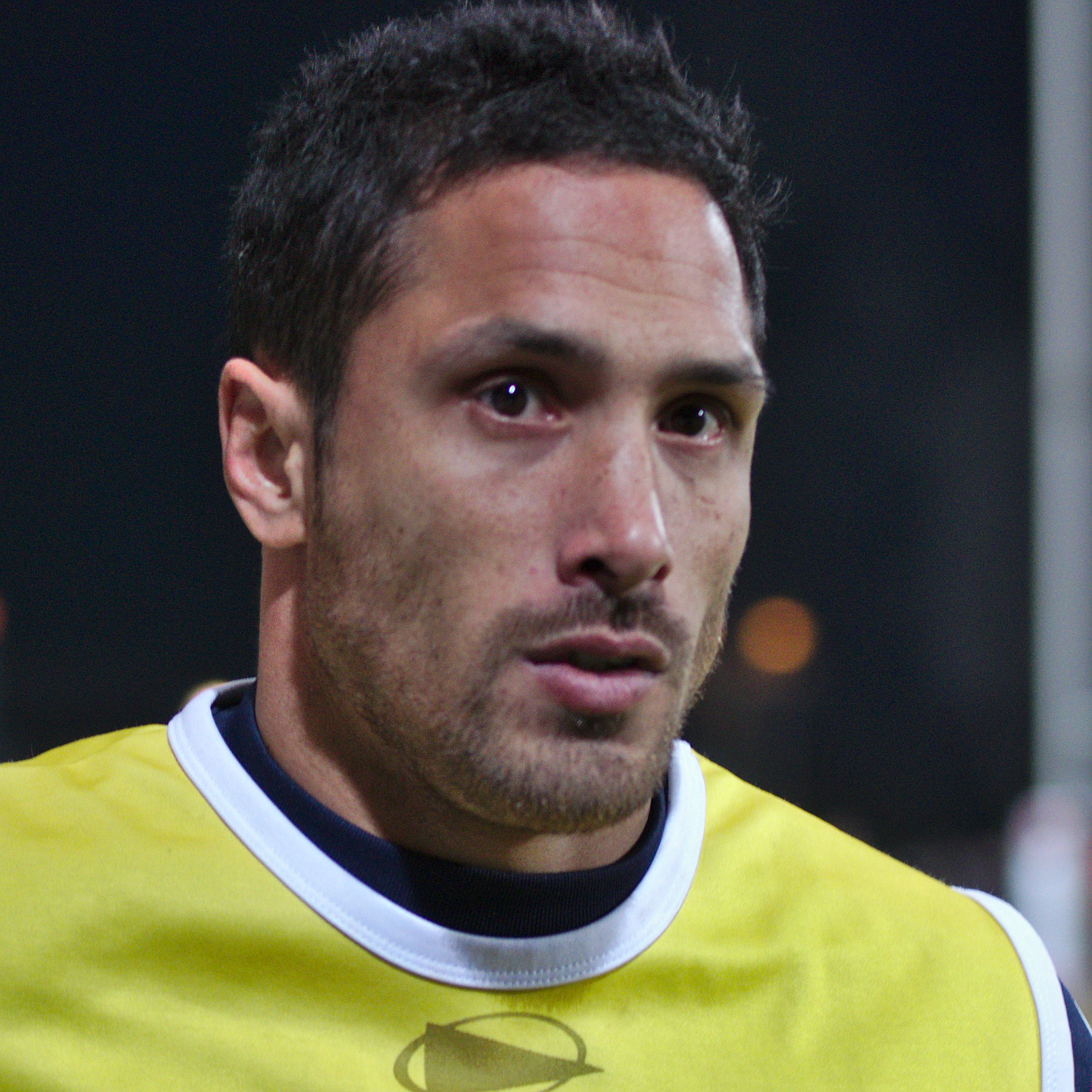
- Born: 23 November 1985 (age 40) Waiouru, New Zealand
- Height: 1.85 m (6 ft 1 in)
- Weight: 85 kg (13 st 5 lb)
- School: Christchurch Boys' High School
- Notable relative: Victor Simpson (stepfather)

Rugby union career
- Position(s): Fly-half, Centre
- Current team: RC Narbonne
Senior career
Years	Team	Apps	(Points)
2011–2013	Toyota Verblitz	9	(80)
2013-2014	Bayonne	25	(83)
2014-16	Lyon	20	(102)
2016-17	RC Narbonne	37	(15)
2016-17	ASM Clermont Auvergne	8	(24)
2017-18	RC Narbonne	6	(54)
- Correct as of 14 December 2019
Provincial / State sides
Years	Team	Apps	(Points)
2005-2011	Canterbury	44	(1,003)
Super Rugby
Years	Team	Apps	(Points)
2006–2009	Crusaders	39	(164)
2010-2011	Blues	31	(191)
International career
Years	Team	Apps	(Points)
2010	New Zealand Maori		

Stephen Brett (born 23 November 1985) is a New Zealand former rugby union footballer. He was previously the head coach for Los Angeles Rugby Team in Major League Rugby (MLR).

== Playing career ==
Brett was a versatile back whose preferred position was first five-eighth, although he could also play second five-eighth and fullback. He is the stepson of former Canterbury and New Zealand centre Victor Simpson. He worked on improving his goal kicking and defensive skills, which led some to suggest Brett's primary weakness is in his defence, thus impeding his progress to higher levels.

=== Super 14 ===
Brett made his Super Rugby debut in 2006 for the Crusaders but had to wait until the following season to make his mark. With regular first-five Daniel Carter being unavailable for much of the season due to the World Cup conditioning program, Brett seized his chance in the number 10 jersey and finished 2007 as the Crusader's top scorer with 90 points. He continued his good form into the 2008 competition, scoring a try and picking up the Man of the Match award in the Crusaders brilliant 54–19 victory over reigning champions the Bulls in Pretoria, before breaking his collarbone in a 55–7 win against the Cheetahs; the injury sidelined Brett for around six weeks. He was signed by the Blues for the 2010 and 2011 seasons,

=== Japan and France ===
On 29 July 2011, Brett left New Zealand to join Japanese club Toyota Verblitz in the Top League on a two-year contract.

On 22 April 2013, Brett left Japan to sign for Bayonne in the French Top 14 from the start of the 2013–14 season. On 17 April 2014, Brett left Bayonne as he signed for another French side, Lyon in the Top 14 on a two-year contract from the 2014–15 season.

== Coaching ==
Brett then transferred his rugby skills into coaching, serving as an Assistant Coach to the now defunct Colorado Raptors and is now the current Head Coach for Rugby ATL in the Major League Rugby competition in the USA.
