= Hosea Gear =

NZ international rugby union player

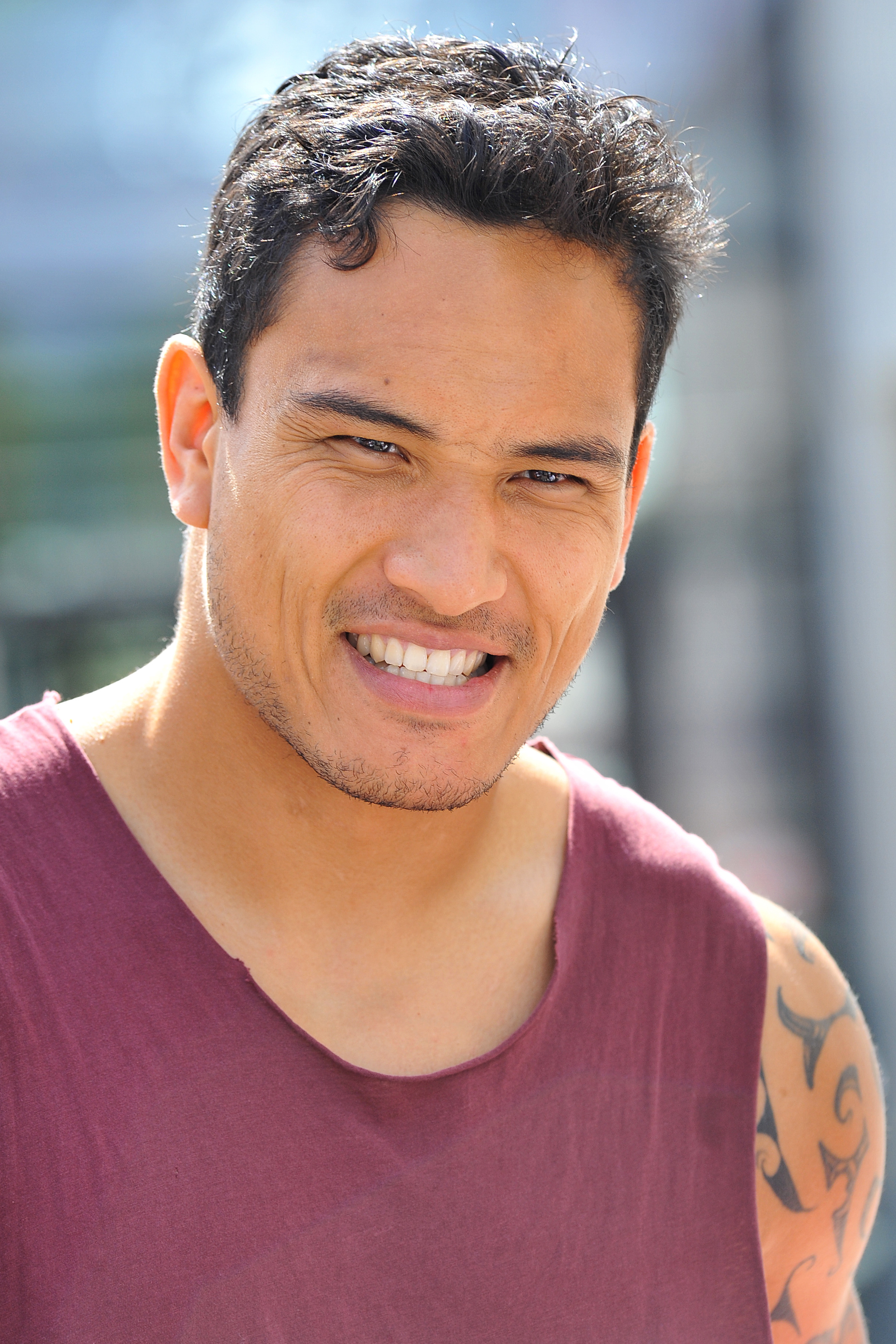
- Gear during a Toulouse outing, August 2013
- Full name: Hosea Emilliano Gear
- Born: 16 March 1984 (age 42) Gisborne, New Zealand
- Height: 188 cm (6 ft 2 in)
- Weight: 104 kg (229 lb; 16 st 5 lb)
- School: Gisborne Boys' High School
- Notable relative: Rico Gear (brother)

Rugby union career
- Position(s): Wing, Centre
Senior career
Years	Team	Apps	(Points)
2002	Poverty Bay	4	(0)
2003–2004	North Harbour	18	(30)
2004–2011	Hurricanes	70	(130)
2005–2011	Wellington	58	(180)
2012–2013	Highlanders	32	(65)
2013–2014	Toulouse	32	(50)
2015	Chiefs	6	(0)
2015–2016	Clermont	17	(10)
2017	Lyon	9	(5)
2017–2018	Narbonne	21	(15)
2021	East Coast	2	(0)
- Correct as of 5 June 2020
International career
Years	Team	Apps	(Points)
2004–2005	New Zealand U21	6	(25)
2004–2010	New Zealand Māori	15	(55)
2008–2012	New Zealand	15	(30)
2009	Junior All Blacks	4	(40)
2014	Barbarian F.C.	1	(12)
- Correct as of 5 June 2020
National sevens team
Years	Team		Comps
2003–2010	New Zealand		N/A
- Correct as of 5 June 2020
Coaching career
- Years: Team
- 2020–: Ngati Porou East Coast
- Correct as of 5 June 2020
Medal record
Men's rugby sevens
Representing New Zealand
Commonwealth Games
Gold medal – first place	2010 Delhi	Team competition

Hosea Emiliano Gear (born 16 March 1984) is a former New Zealand rugby union player who played as a wing. He has also played 14 international matches for New Zealand.

== Early life ==
The younger brother of Rico Gear, he was born in Gisborne, New Zealand, where he attended Gisborne Boys' High School. He is of the Ngāti Porou Iwi.

== Rugby career ==
He currently holds the record for most tries in a provincial season with 14 in the 2008 Air New Zealand Cup. He has played for the New Zealand Maori. After his outstanding performance for Wellington in the 2008 Air New Zealand Cup, he was chosen for the All Blacks to tour Hong Kong and Europe on 26 October 2008 and made his debut against Australia in the Bledisloe Cup on 1 November. In 2010 Gear made his Rugby Sevens debut in the 2010 Commonwealth Games for New Zealand and was chosen for the All Blacks end of year tour. After an injury to Cory Jane, Gear was given a starting spot against England, a game in which he scored the first try. The following week vs Scotland Gear once again scored the first try and then went on later to score another in the All Blacks 49–3 win. Again Gear scored the first Try in the All Blacks vs Wales game, also going on to score another to top off a great international year.

Gear initially narrowly missed selection to the New Zealand squad for the 2011 Rugby World Cup. However, after a string of injuries to the All Black's squad, Gear was called up prior to the semi-final match against the Wallabies. He was not named in the twenty-two man team to play the match. He received a World Cup winner's medal after the final which New Zealand won 8–7, but he was not in the match-day 22.

Hosea Gear ended his rugby career when he transitioned from a player-coach to first XV coach for East Coast in late 2021. He also coached the Ngati Porou East Coast rugby team.

Awards
Preceded by Zac Guildford	Tom French Memorial; Māori rugby union player of the year 2010	Succeeded by Piri Weepu
