= 2010 ITM Cup =

2010 rugby union competition in New Zealand

2010 ITM Cup season
- Countries: New Zealand
- Date: 29 July – 5 November
- Champions: Canterbury
- Runners-up: Waikato
- Matches played: 91
- Tries scored: 527 (average 5.8 per match)
- Top point scorer: Lachie Munro (Northland); 172 points
- Top try scorer: Robbie Fruean (Canterbury) and Lelia Masaga (Bay of Plenty); 10 tries

Official website
- www.provincial.rugby

The 2010 ITM Cup season was the fifth season of New Zealand's provincial rugby union competition since it turned professional in 2006. The regular season began on July 29, when Taranaki hosted Northland. It involved the top fourteen rugby unions of New Zealand. For sponsorship reasons, the competition was known as the ITM Cup and it was the first season under the lead sponsor. The winner of the competition, Canterbury was promoted along with the top seventh placed teams to the Premiership, the bottom seventh placed teams were relegated to the Championship.

== Format ==
The ITM Cup standings were sorted by a competition points system. Four points were awarded to the winning team, a draw equaled two points, whilst a loss amounted to zero points. Unions could also win their side a respectable bonus point. To receive a bonus point, they must have scored four tries or more or lose by seven or fewer points or less. Each team was placed on their total points received. If necessary of a tiebreaker, when two or more teams finish on equal points, the union who defeated the other in a head-to-head got placed higher. In case of a draw between them, the side with the biggest points deferential margin got rights to be ranked above. If they were tied on points difference, it was then decided by a highest scored try count or a coin toss. This seeding format was implemented since the beginning of the 2006 competition.

The competition was a decider for the top and bottom seven placed unions that would respectively become a part of the Premiership and Championship divisions for the 2011 season. This would form a promotion-relegation process with the winner of the Championship receiving automatic promotion to the Premiership, replacing the seventh-placed team in the Premiership which would be relegated to the Championship for the following year. The regular season consisted of two types of matches where each team played the other thirteen unions over the course of thirteen consecutive weeks. Furthermore teams played home and away, either hosting six games and travelling for seven or hosting seven and travelling for six. The finals format allowed the top four teams move on to the semi-finals. The top two winners, based on table points, received a home semi-final. In the first round of the finals, the semi-finals, the second placed winner hosted the third placed winner, and the first placed winner hosted the fourth placed winner. The final was hosted by the top remaining seed.

== Standings ==
Source: ITM Cup standings 2010

Overall
Pos	Team	GP	W	D	L	PF	PA	PD	TB	LB	PTS
1	RS – Canterbury	13	9	1	3	372	290	+82	6	1	45
2	Auckland	13	9	1	3	352	200	+152	5	2	45
3	Waikato	13	9	1	3	351	245	+106	5	1	44
4	Wellington	13	8	0	5	375	296	+79	6	4	42
5	Taranaki	13	9	0	4	347	306	+41	5	1	42
6	Bay of Plenty	13	7	0	6	341	303	+38	6	3	37
7	Southland	13	8	0	5	253	255	−2	2	0	34
8	Hawke's Bay	13	5	3	5	292	287	+5	4	3	33
9	Counties Manukau	13	6	0	7	296	313	−17	4	3	31
10	Northland	13	5	0	8	372	334	+38	5	4	29
11	North Harbour	13	4	0	9	359	461	−102	3	2	21
12	Tasman	13	4	0	9	229	340	−111	1	3	20
13	Manawatu	13	3	0	10	272	423	−151	3	3	18
14	Otago	13	2	0	11	223	381	−158	0	2	10

=== Standings progression ===
Overall
Team	W1	W2	W3	W4	W5	W6	W7	W8	W9	W10	W11	W12	W13
Auckland	5 (1st)	6 (5th)	10 (4th)	14 (3rd)	14 (6th)	18 (6th)	22 (4th)	27 (3rd)	28 (4th)	30 (5th)	35 (4th)	40 (3rd)	45 (2nd)
Bay of Plenty	1 (9th)	6 (6th)	7 (9th)	7 (11th)	12 (8th)	12 (9th)	17 (9th)	21 (8th)	26 (7th)	30 (6th)	32 (7th)	37 (6th)	37 (6th)
Canterbury	2 (7th)	7 (4th)	12 (2nd)	13 (6th)	18 (4th)	22 (1st)	26 (1st)	26 (4th)	31 (2nd)	36 (1st)	40 (1st)	45 (1st)	45 (1st)
Counties Manukau	5 (2nd)	9 (1st)	10 (3rd)	15 (2nd)	15 (5th)	19 (4th)	19 (7th)	20 (9th)	25 (8th)	29 (7th)	29 (8th)	29 (8th)	31 (9th)
Hawke's Bay	2 (8th)	2 (11th)	2 (12th)	3 (12th)	7 (12th)	8 (12th)	10 (11th)	11 (12th)	16 (11th)	19 (11th)	23 (9th)	28 (9th)	33 (8th)
Manawatu	0 (12th)	2 (12th)	2 (13th)	2 (13th)	2 (13th)	7 (13th)	7 (14th)	7 (14th)	8 (14th)	12 (12th)	12 (13th)	13 (13th)	18 (13th)
North Harbour	0 (14th)	4 (10th)	4 (10th)	8 (9th)	9 (10th)	9 (10th)	9 (12th)	13 (10th)	18 (10th)	19 (10th)	19 (11th)	19 (12th)	21 (11th)
Northland	4 (5th)	5 (9th)	10 (7th)	10 (7th)	11 (9th)	16 (8th)	17 (8th)	21 (7th)	21 (9th)	22 (9th)	22 (10th)	24 (10th)	29 (10th)
Otago	0 (13th)	1 (13th)	1 (14th)	1 (14th)	1 (14th)	5 (14th)	9 (13th)	10 (13th)	10 (13th)	10 (14th)	10 (14th)	10 (14th)	10 (14th)
Southland	5 (3rd)	9 (2nd)	13 (1st)	17 (1st)	21 (1st)	21 (2nd)	26 (2nd)	30 (1st)	34 (1st)	34 (2nd)	34 (5th)	34 (7th)	34 (7th)
Taranaki	1 (10th)	6 (7th)	10 (5th)	14 (4th)	18 (3rd)	18 (5th)	22 (3rd)	27 (2nd)	28 (3rd)	32 (3rd)	37 (2nd)	37 (5th)	42 (5th)
Tasman	0 (11th)	0 (14th)	4 (11th)	8 (10th)	9 (11th)	9 (11th)	10 (10th)	11 (11th)	11 (12th)	11 (13th)	15 (12th)	20 (11th)	20 (12th)
Waikato	4 (6th)	8 (3rd)	8 (8th)	8 (8th)	13 (7th)	18 (7th)	21 (6th)	22 (6th)	26 (6th)	31 (4th)	36 (3rd)	40 (2nd)	44 (3rd)
Wellington	4 (4th)	5 (8th)	10 (6th)	14 (5th)	19 (2nd)	20 (3rd)	21 (5th)	25 (5th)	27 (5th)	28 (8th)	33 (6th)	38 (4th)	42 (4th)
The table above shows a team's progression throughout the season. For each week, their cumulative points total is shown with the overall log position in brackets.
Key:	win	draw	loss	bye									

== Regular season ==
The 2010 ITM Cup was played across 13 weeks, with every team playing one another during Thursday to Sunday night fixtures. The competition started on Thursday, 29 July, with Taranaki taking on Northland at Yarrow Stadium.

=== Week 1 ===
29 July 2010
19:35 NZST

Taranaki	19–26	Northland
Try: Chris Walker; Con: Willie Ripia; Pen: Willie Ripia (4)	Report	Try: Dean Budd; Lachie Munro; Simon Munro; Con: Lachie Munro; Pen: Lachie Munro (3)

Yarrow Stadium, New Plymouth
Referee: Garratt Williamson (New Zealand)

30 July 2010
19:35 NZST

Canterbury	23–23	Hawke's Bay
Try: Sean Maitland; Tumatauenga Umaga-Marshall; Con: Colin Slade (2); Pen: Colin Slade (3)	Report	Try: Hika Elliot; Pen: Andrew Horrell (3); Daniel Kirkpatrick (3); Cards: Clint Newland (yellow card)

Lancaster Park, Christchurch
Referee: Matthew Stanish (New Zealand)

31 July 2010
14:35 NZST

Manawatu	23–37	Southland
Try: Hadleigh Parkes; Aaron Smith; Con: Shannon Paku (2); Pen: Craig Clare (3)	Report	Try: Scott Cowan; Elliot Dixon; Jamie Mackintosh; Mark Wells; James Wilson; Con: Robbie Robinson (3); Pen: James Wilson (2); Cards: Brayden Mitchell (yellow card)

Arena Manawatu, Palmerston North
Referee: Glenn Newman (New Zealand)

31 July 2010
16:30 NZST

Counties Manukau	29–13	Otago
Try: Ahsee Tuala (2); Tim Nanai-Williams; Siale Piutau; Con: Dean Cummins (3); Pen: Dean Cummins; Cards: Jono Owen (yellow card); Grant Henson (yellow card)	Report	Try: Chris Small; Con: Glenn Dickson; Pen: Glenn Dickson (2)

Bayer Growers Stadium, Pukekohe
Referee: Vinny Munro (New Zealand)

31 July 2010
18:35 NZST

Waikato	13–10	Bay of Plenty
Try: Brendon Leonard; Con: Trent Renata; Pen: Trent Renata; Dwayne Sweeney; Cards: Jack Lam (yellow card)	Report	Try: Tanerau Latimer; Con: Phil Burleigh; Pen: Daniel Waenga

Waikato Stadium, Hamilton
Referee: Kane McBride (New Zealand)

1 August 2010
14:35 NZST

North Harbour	14–36	Auckland
Try: Tom Chamberlain; Pen: Luke McAlister (3)	Report	Try: Daniel Braid; Chay Raui; Dave Thomas; Brent Ward; Con: Matt Berquist; Ash Moeke; Pen: Ash Moeke (3); Matt Berquist

North Harbour Stadium, Albany
Referee: Nick Briant (New Zealand)

1 August 2010
16:35 NZST

Wellington	20–11	Tasman
Try: Dane Coles; Julian Savea; Jeremy Thrush; Con: Fa'atonu Fili; Pen: Fa'atonu Fili	Report	Try: Robbie Malneek; Pen: Steve Alfeld (2); Cards: Chris Jack (yellow card)

Wellington Regional Stadium, Wellington
Referee: Josh Noonan (New Zealand)

=== Week 2 ===
5 August 2010
19:35 NZST

Manawatu	26–27	Canterbury
Try: Lote Raikabula (2); Tomasi Cama; Casey Stone; Con: Shannon Paku (2); Craig Clare; Cards: Reece Robinson (yellow card)	Report	Try: Robbie Fruean (2); Sean Maitland; Telusa Veainu; Con: Colin Slade (2); Pen: Colin Slade

Arena Manawatu, Palmerston North
Referee: Richard Kelly (New Zealand)

6 August 2010
19:35 NZST

Taranaki	33–11	Tasman
Try: Kurt Baker; Jarrad Hoeata; Tyson Keats; George Pisi; David Smith; Con: Willie Ripia (3); Beauden Barrett; Cards: Scott Waldrom (yellow card)	Report	Try: Vernon Fredericks; Pen: Steve Alfeld (2)

Yarrow Stadium, New Plymouth
Referee: Shane McDermott (New Zealand)

6 August 2010
19:35 NZST

Hawke's Bay	11–30	Bay of Plenty
Try: Richard Buckman; Pen: Andrew Horrell (2)	Report	Try: Colin Bourke; Lelia Masaga; Taniela Moa; Chad Tuoro; Daniel Waenga; Con: Phil Burleigh; Pen: Daniel Waenga

McLean Park, Napier
Referee: Mike Fraser (New Zealand)

7 August 2010
14:35 NZST

Auckland	18–21	Waikato
Try: Onosai Tololima-Auva'a; Peter Saili; Con: Matt Berquist; Pen: Matt Berquist (2)	Report	Try: Sosene Anesi; Dwayne Sweeney; Con: Trent Renata; Pen: Trent Renata (3)

Eden Park, Auckland
Referee: Vinny Munro (New Zealand)

7 August 2010
16:35 NZST

RS – Southland	16–12	Otago
Try: Jamie Mackintosh; Con: James Wilson; Pen: Robbie Robinson (2); James Wilson	Report	Pen: Glenn Dickson (3); Drop: Glenn Dickson; Cards: Glenn Dickson (yellow card); Sam Hibbard (yellow card)

Rugby Park Stadium, Invercargill
Referee: Jonathon White (New Zealand)

8 August 2010
14:35 NZST

Wellington	25–31	Counties Manukau
Try: Hosea Gear; Charlie Ngatai; Shaun Treeby; Con: Fa'atonu Fili; Hayden Cripps; Pen: Fa'atonu Fili (2)	Report	Try: Ahsee Tuala (2); Rey Lee-Lo; Con: Baden Kerr (2); Pen: Baden Kerr (4)

Wellington Regional Stadium, Wellington
Referee: Shaun Elliott (New Zealand)

8 August 2010
16:35 NZST

Northland	24–25	North Harbour
Try: Dean Budd; Bryce Heem; David Holwell; Con: Lachie Munro (3); Pen: Lachie Munro	Report	Try: Mat Luamanu; Con: Mike Harris; Pen: Mike Harris (3); Ben Botica (2); Drop: Ben Botica; Cards: Anthony Boric (yellow card)

Okara Park, Whangārei
Referee: Ben Skeen (New Zealand)

=== Week 3 ===
12 August 2010
19:35 NZST

Tasman	21–7	Hawke's Bay
Try: James Kamana; James Marshall; Tom Marshall; Con: Steve Alfeld (3)	Report	Try: Israel Dagg; Con: Daniel Kirkpatrick

Lansdowne Park, Blenheim
Referee: Kane McBride (New Zealand)

13 August 2010
19:35 NZST

Canterbury	44–22	North Harbour
Try: Robbie Fruean (3); Sam Monaghan; Isaac Ross; Matt Todd; Telusa Veainu; Con: Colin Slade (3); Pen: Colin Slade	Report	Try: Mike Harris; Jack Tarrant; Josh York; Con: Ben Botica; Mike Harris; Pen: Mike Harris

Lancaster Park, Christchurch
Referee: Jonathon White (New Zealand)

14 August 2010
14:35 NZST

Bay of Plenty	6–11	Auckland
Pen: Phil Burleigh (2)	Report	Try: Atieli Pakalani; Pen: Matt Berquist (2); Cards: Onosai Tololima-Auva'a (yellow card)

Baypark Stadium, Tauranga
Referee: Josh Noonan (New Zealand)

14 August 2010
17:30 NZST

RS – Southland	13–9	Counties Manukau
Try: Jason Rutledge; Con: Robbie Robinson; Pen: Robbie Robinson; Drop: Robbie Robinson	Report	Pen: Baden Kerr (3)

Rugby Park Stadium, Invercargill
Referee: Garratt Williamson (New Zealand)

14 August 2010
19:35 NZST

Otago	22–35	Wellington
Try: Chris Small; Josh Tatupu; Fetuʻu Vainikolo; Con: Glenn Dickson (2); Pen: Glenn Dickson	Report	Try: Julian Savea (2); Alby Mathewson; Jeremy Thrush; Con: Fa'atonu Fili (3); Pen: Fa'atonu Fili (3)

Carisbrook, Dunedin
Referee: James McPhail (New Zealand)

15 August 2010
14:35 NZST

Northland	77–8	Manawatu
Try: Jared Payne (4); Lachie Munro (2); Mark Burman; Rhyan Caine; David Holwell; Dan Pryor; Con: Lachie Munro (8); David Holwell; Pen: Lachie Munro (2); David Holwell; Cards: Lachie Munro (yellow card)	Report	Try: Ma'afu Fia; Pen: Craig Clare; Cards: Doug Tietjens (yellow card)

Okara Park, Whangārei
Referee: Bryce Lawrence (New Zealand)

15 August 2010
16:35 NZST

Waikato	23–33	Taranaki
Try: Romana Graham; Savenaca Tokula; Con: Trent Renata (2); Pen: Trent Renata (3); Cards: Romana Graham (yellow card); Liam Messam (yellow card)	Report	Try: Kurt Baker; Andre Taylor; Scott Waldrom; Con: Willie Ripia (3); Pen: Willie Ripia (3); Beauden Barrett

Waikato Stadium, Hamilton
Referee: Chris Pollock (New Zealand)

=== Week 4 ===
19 August 2010
19:35 NZST

North Harbour	35–23	Otago
Try: Malakai Ravulo (2); Con: Ben Botica; Luke McAlister; Pen: Ben Botica (5); Luke McAlister (2)	Report	Try: Halani Aulika; Joe Hill; Con: Glenn Dickson (2); Pen: Glenn Dickson (3)

North Harbour Stadium, Albany
Referee: Bryce Lawrence (New Zealand)

20 August 2010
19:35 NZST

Taranaki	24–15	Bay of Plenty
Try: Scott Waldrom; Jayden Hayward; David Smith; Con: Willie Ripia (3); Pen: Willie Ripia	Report	Try: Colin Bourke; Ben Smith; Con: Phil Burleigh; Pen: Daniel Waenga

Yarrow Stadium, New Plymouth
Referee: Vinny Munro (New Zealand)

21 August 2010
14:35 NZST

Tasman	27–25	Canterbury
Try: Tom Marshall; James Kamana; Francis Smith; Con: Steve Alfeld (3); Pen: Steve Alfeld (2)	Report	Try: Telusa Veainu; Andy Ellis; Steve Fualau; Con: Colin Slade (2); Pen: Colin Slade (2)

Trafalgar Park, Nelson
Referee: Nick Briant (New Zealand)

21 August 2010
17:30 NZST

Counties Manukau	35–14	Manawatu
Try: Fritz Lee; Mark Selwyn; Ahsee Tuala; Sherwin Stowers; Tim Nanai-Williams; Con: Baden Kerr (5)	Report	Try: Casey Stone; Isaac Thompson; Con: Craig Clare; Isaac Thompson

Bayer Growers Stadium, Pukekohe
Referee: Nathan Pearce (Australia)

21 August 2010
19:35 NZST

Wellington	26–14	Waikato
Try: Julian Savea; Daniel Ramsay; Dane Coles; Con: Fa'atonu Fili; Pen: Fa'atonu Fili (2); Drop: Fa'atonu Fili	Report	Try: Jack Lam; Pen: Trent Renata (3)

Wellington Regional Stadium, Wellington
Referee: Chris Pollock (New Zealand)

22 August 2010
14:35 NZST

Auckland	26–13	Northland
Try: Pauliasi Manu; Toby Morland; Con: Matt Berquist (2); Pen: Matt Berquist (4)	Report	Try: Mikaele Tuu'u; Con: Lachie Munro; Pen: Lachie Munro (2)

Eden Park, Auckland
Referee: Glenn Newman (New Zealand)

22 August 2010
16:35 NZST

Hawke's Bay	20–23	Southland
Try: Sinoti Sinoti; Bryn Evans; Zac Guildford; Con: Daniel Kirkpatrick; Pen: Daniel Kirkpatrick	Report	Try: Pehi Te Whare; Matt Saunders; Con: Robbie Robinson (2); Pen: Robbie Robinson (3); Cards: Tim Boys (yellow card)

McLean Park, Napier
Referee: Matthew Stanish (New Zealand)

=== Week 5 ===
26 August 2010
19:35 NZST

Otago	15–25	Taranaki
Try: Hoani Matenga; Halani Aulika; Con: Glenn Dickson; Pen: Glenn Dickson	Report	Try: Beauden Barrett; Craig Clarke; Andre Taylor; Con: Willie Ripia (2); Pen: Willie Ripia (2)

Carisbrook, Dunedin
Referee: Keith Brown (New Zealand)

27 August 2010
19:35 NZST

Tasman	16–21	Southland
Try: Blair Cook; Con: James Marshall; Pen: James Marshall; Steve Alfeld (2)	Report	Pen: Robbie Robinson (7)

Lansdowne Park, Blenheim
Referee: Nathan Pearce (Australia)

28 August 2010
14:35 NZST

Waikato	39–3	Counties Manukau
Try: Tim Mikkelson (2); Aled de Malmanche; Sosene Anesi; Sam Christie; Con: Trent Renata (3); Dwayne Sweeney; Pen: Trent Renata (2)	Report	Pen: Tim Nanai-Williams

Waikato Stadium, Hamilton
Referee: Ben Skeen (New Zealand)

28 August 2010
17:30 NZST

Wellington	31–28	Northland
Try: Shaun Treeby; Victor Vito (2); Julian Savea; John Schwalger; Con: Fa'atonu Fili (3)	Report	Try: Aaron Bancroft; Dean Budd (2); Con: Lachie Munro (2); Pen: Lachie Munro (3)

Wellington Regional Stadium, Wellington
Referee: Richard Kelly (New Zealand)

28 August 2010
19:35 NZST

Canterbury	35–16	Auckland
Try: Luke Romano; Telusa Veainu; Robbie Fruean; Sean Maitland; Con: Colin Slade (3); Pen: Colin Slade (3)	Report	Try: Onosai Tololima-Auva'a; Con: Ash Moeke; Pen: Matt Berquist (3)

Lancaster Park, Christchurch
Referee: Garratt Williamson (New Zealand)

29 August 2010
14:35 NZST

Manawatu	9–17	Hawke's Bay
Pen: Aaron Cruden (3)	Report	Try: Gillies Kaka; Pen: Daniel Kirkpatrick (4)

Arena Manawatu, Palmerston North
Referee: Kane McBride (New Zealand)

29 August 2010
16:35 NZST

Bay of Plenty	39–29	North Harbour
Try: Phil Burleigh; Luke Braid; Lance MacDonald; Lelia Masaga (3); Con: Mike Delany (3); Pen: Mike Delany	Report	Try: Jack Tarrant; Anthony Boric; James Parsons; Nafi Tuitavake; Con: Luke McAlister; Mike Harris (2); Pen: Mike Harris

Rotorua International Stadium, Rotorua
Referee: Shaun Elliott (New Zealand)

=== Week 6 ===
2 September 2010
19:35 NZST

Counties Manukau	23–3	Tasman
Try: Ahsee Tuala; Sherwin Stowers; Con: Tim Nanai-Williams (2); Pen: Tim Nanai-Williams (3)	Report	Pen: Steve Alfeld

Bayer Growers Stadium, Pukekohe
Referee: Kane McBride (New Zealand)

3 September 2010
19:35 NZST

Canterbury	28–9	Bay of Plenty
Try: Nasi Manu; Matt Todd; Robbie Fruean; Con: Stephen Brett (2); Pen: Stephen Brett (3)	Report	Pen: Mike Delany (3)

Lancaster Park, Christchurch
Referee: Garratt Williamson (New Zealand)

4 September 2010
14:35 NZST

Manawatu	36–24	Wellington
Try: Shannon Paku; Hadleigh Parkes; Fraser Stone; Asaeli Tikoirotuma; Con: Isaac Thompson; Craig Clare; Pen: Isaac Thompson (4)	Report	Try: Tajhon Mailata (2); Alapati Leiua; Julian Savea; Con: Fa'atonu Fili (2); Cards: Scott Fuglistaller (yellow card)

Arena Manawatu, Palmerston North
Referee: Vinny Munro (New Zealand)

4 September 2010
17:30 NZST

Northland	33–22	Southland
Try: Rene Ranger; Dan Pryor; Jared Payne (2); Con: Lachie Munro (2); Pen: Lachie Munro (3); Cards: Dan Pryor (yellow card)	Report	Try: Chris King; Jamie Mackintosh (2); Con: Robbie Robinson (2); Pen: Robbie Robinson

Okara Park, Whangārei
Referee: Matthew Stanish (New Zealand)

4 September 2010
19:35 NZST

North Harbour	27–36	Waikato
Try: Ben Afeaki; Alipate Fatafehi; James Parsons; Con: Mike Harris (3); Pen: Mike Harris (2)	Report	Try: Brendon Leonard; Dwayne Sweeney; Christian Lealiifano; Dominiko Waqaniburotu; Con: Trent Renata (2); Pen: Trent Renata (4)

North Harbour Stadium, Albany
Referee: Shane McDermott (New Zealand)

5 September 2010
14:35 NZST

Auckland	27–13	Taranaki
Try: Atieli Pakalani; Winston Stanley; Con: Matt Berquist; Pen: Matt Berquist (5)	Report	Try: Samuela Vunisa; Con: Willie Ripia; Pen: Willie Ripia (2)

Eden Park, Auckland
Referee: Bryce Lawrence (New Zealand)

5 September 2010
16:35 NZST

Otago	17–16	Hawke's Bay
Try: Alando Soakai; Kees Meeuws; Con: Glenn Dickson (2); Pen: Glenn Dickson	Report	Try: Hika Elliot; Con: Daniel Kirkpatrick; Pen: Daniel Kirkpatrick (2); Mark Jackman

Carisbrook, Dunedin
Referee: James McPhail (New Zealand)

=== Week 7 ===
9 September 2010
19:35 NZST

Bay of Plenty	41–13	Manawatu
Try: Tristan Moran (2); Corey Aporo; Lelia Masaga; Culum Retallick; Grant McQuoid; Con: Mike Delany (2); Colin Bourke; Dan Waenga; Pen: Mike Delany	Report	Try: Bertus Mulder; Con: Craig Clare; Pen: Isaac Thompson (2)

Baypark Stadium, Tauranga
Referee: Garratt Williamson (New Zealand)

10 September 2010
19:35 NZST

RS – Southland	47–21	North Harbour
Try: Matt Saunders; Jamie Mackintosh; Scott Cowan; Glen Horton; Kendrick Lynn (2); Tony Koonwaiyou; Con: Robbie Robinson (6)	Report	Try: Nafi Tuitavake; Mike Harris; Malakai Ravulo; Con: Mike Harris (3)

Rugby Park Stadium, Invercargill
Referee: Vinny Munro (New Zealand)

11 September 2010
14:35 NZST

Hawke's Bay	27–27	Waikato
Try: Clint Newland; Gillies Kaka; Con: Daniel Kirkpatrick; Pen: Daniel Kirkpatrick (3); Richard Buckman (2)	Report	Try: Savenaca Tokula; Liam Messam; Trent Renata; Toby Smith; Con: Trent Renata (2); Pen: Trent Renata

McLean Park, Napier
Referee: Kane McBride (New Zealand)

11 September 2010
16:30 NZST

Northland	23–27	Canterbury
Try: Bronson Murray; Cameron Eyre; Con: Lachie Munro (2); Pen: Lachie Munro (3); Cards: Pat O'Connor (yellow card)	Report	Try: Robbie Fruean; Luke Romano; Isaac Ross; Con: Stephen Brett (3); Pen: Stephen Brett; Andy Ellis; Cards: George Whitelock (yellow card)

Okara Park, Whangārei
Referee: Mike Fraser (New Zealand)

11 September 2010
18:35 NZST

Auckland	21–15	Wellington
Try: Liaki Moli; Matt Berquist; Con: Matt Berquist; Pen: Matt Berquist (3)	Report	Pen: Lima Sopoaga (5)

Eden Park, Auckland
Referee: Chris Pollock (New Zealand)

12 September 2010
14:35 NZST

Tasman	11–13	Otago
Try: Chris Jack; Pen: Steve Alfeld (2)	Report	Try: Halani Aulika; Con: Glenn Dickson; Pen: Glenn Dickson (2)

Trafalgar Park, Nelson
Referee: Glenn Newman (New Zealand)

12 September 2010
16:35 NZST

Taranaki	28–19	Counties Manukau
Try: David Smith; Kurt Baker; Tyson Keats; Con: Willie Ripia (2); Pen: Willie Ripia (3)	Report	Try: Simon Lemalu; Con: Tim Nanai-Williams; Pen: Tim Nanai-Williams (4)

Yarrow Stadium, New Plymouth
Referee: Matthew Stanish (New Zealand)

=== Week 8 ===
16 September 2010
19:35 NZST

Waikato	6–7	Southland
Pen: Trent Renata (2)	Report	Try: Kendrick Lynn; Con: Robbie Robinson

Waikato Stadium, Hamilton
Referee: Ben Skeen (New Zealand)

17 September 2010
19:35 NZST

Manawatu	6–32	Auckland
Pen: Isaac Thompson (2)	Report	Try: Liaki Moli; Angus Ta'avao; Brenton Helleur; Dave Thomas; Con: Gareth Anscombe (3); Pen: Gareth Anscombe (2)

Arena Manawatu, Palmerston North
Referee: Keith Brown (New Zealand)

18 September 2010
14:35 NZST

Taranaki	31–20	Canterbury
Try: Ben Souness; Kurt Baker; George Pisi; Jarrad Hoeata; Beauden Barrett; Con: Willie Ripia (2); Andre Taylor	Report	Try: Sean Maitland; Sonny Bill Williams; Con: Stephen Brett (2); Pen: Stephen Brett (2)

Yarrow Stadium, New Plymouth
Referee: Chris Pollock (New Zealand)

18 September 2010
17:30 NZST

Wellington	17–13	Hawke's Bay
Try: Hosea Gear; Tajhon Mailata; Lima Sopoaga; Con: Lima Sopoaga	Report	Try: Kahn Fotuali'i; Con: Richard Buckman; Pen: Richard Buckman (2)

Wellington Regional Stadium, Wellington
Referee: James McPhail (New Zealand)

18 September 2010
19:35 NZST

Tasman	21–28	North Harbour
Try: Chris Jack; James Marshall; Con: Steve Alfeld; Pen: Steve Alfeld (3)	Report	Try: Mat Luamanu; Nafi Tuitavake; Jack Tarrant; Con: Mike Harris (2); Pen: Mike Harris (3)

Trafalgar Park, Nelson
Referee: Shane McDermott (New Zealand)

19 September 2010
14:35 NZST

Otago	8–13	Northland
Try: Hayden Triggs; Pen: Hayden Parker	Report	Try: Jared Payne; Con: Lachie Munro; Pen: Lachie Munro (2)

Carisbrook, Dunedin
Referee: Jonathon White (New Zealand)

19 September 2010
16:35 NZST

Bay of Plenty	24–21	Counties Manukau
Try: Lelia Masaga; Taniela Moa; Mike Delany; Con: Mike Delany (2); Tanerau Latimer; Pen: Mike Delany	Report	Try: Taiasina Tuifu'a; Siale Piutau; Con: Tim Nanai-Williams; Pen: Tim Nanai-Williams (3)

Baypark Stadium, Tauranga
Referee: Matthew Stanish (New Zealand)

=== Week 9 ===
23 September 2010
19:35 NZST

RS – Southland	9–6	Auckland
Pen: Robbie Robinson (3)	Report	Pen: Matt Berquist (2)

Rugby Park Stadium, Invercargill
Referee: Vinny Munro (New Zealand)

24 September 2010
19:35 NZST

Bay of Plenty	40–30	Otago
Try: Lelia Masaga; Phil Burleigh; Josh Hohneck; Colin Bourke; Solomon King; Con: Mike Delany (3); Pen: Mike Delany (3)	Report	Try: Hayden Triggs; Chris Small; Ben Smith; Con: Chris Noakes (2); Glenn Dickson; Pen: Glenn Dickson (3)

Rotorua International Stadium, Rotorua
Referee: Ben Skeen (New Zealand)

25 September 2010
14:35 NZST

Canterbury	37–30	Wellington
Try: Telusa Veainu; Andy Ellis; Sean Maitland; Sonny Bill Williams; Con: Colin Slade (4); Pen: Colin Slade (3)	Report	Try: Hosea Gear (2); Faifili Levave; Alby Mathewson; Con: Lima Sopoaga (2); Pen: Lima Sopoaga (2)

Lancaster Park, Christchurch
Referee: Bryce Lawrence (New Zealand)

25 September 2010
17:30 NZST

Hawke's Bay	32–24	Taranaki
Try: Jason Shoemark; Ryan McLeod; Hika Elliot; Zac Guildford; Con: Richard Buckman (3); Pen: Richard Buckman (2)	Report	Try: David Smith; Kane Barrett; Kurt Baker; Jayden Hayward; Con: Willie Ripia; Andre Taylor; Cards: Michael Bent (yellow card)

McLean Park, Napier
Referee: Keith Brown (New Zealand)

25 September 2010
19:35 NZST

Waikato	33–15	Tasman
Try: Alex Bradley (2); Savenaca Tokula; Con: Stephen Donald (3); Pen: Stephen Donald (4)	Report	Try: Afeleke Pelenise; Craig Moore; Con: James Marshall; Pen: Steve Alfeld; Cards: Shane Christie (yellow card)

Waikato Stadium, Hamilton
Referee: Garratt Williamson (New Zealand)

26 September 2010
14:35 NZST

North Harbour	44–30	Manawatu
Try: Ken Pisi; Mat Luamanu (3); Nafi Tuitavake; Con: Mike Harris (4); Ben Botica; Pen: Mike Harris (2); Ben Botica	Report	Try: Hamish Gosling; Michael Fitzgerald; Craig Clare; Frank Bryant; Con: Isaac Thompson; Craig Clare; Pen: Isaac Thompson (2)

North Harbour Stadium, Albany
Referee: Richard Kelly (New Zealand)

26 September 2010
16:35 NZST

Counties Manukau	40–24	Northland
Try: Fritz Lee; Taiasina Tuifu'a; Simon Lemalu; Sherwin Stowers; Ahsee Tuala; Con: Tim Nanai-Williams (2); Dean Cummins; Pen: Tim Nanai-Williams (2); Dean Cummins; Cards: Fritz Lee (red card)	Report	Try: Rhyan Caine (2); Dean Budd; Con: Lachie Munro (3); Pen: Lachie Munro

Bayer Growers Stadium, Pukekohe
Referee: Chris Pollock (New Zealand)

=== Week 10 ===
30 September 2010
19:35 NZST

Wellington	24–31	Bay of Plenty
Try: Dane Coles; Alby Mathewson; Con: Lima Sopoaga; Pen: Lima Sopoaga (4)	Report	Try: Ben Smith; Corey Aporo; Lelia Masaga; Con: Mike Delany (2); Pen: Mike Delany (4)

Wellington Regional Stadium, Wellington
Referee: Keith Brown (New Zealand)

1 October 2010
19:35 NZST

Auckland	34–34	Hawke's Bay
Try: Daniel Braid (2); Winston Stanley; Con: Matt Berquist (2); Pen: Matt Berquist (5); Cards: Charlie Faumuina (yellow card)	Report	Try: Jason Shoemark; Mark Jackman; Trent Boswell-Wakefield; Sinoti Sinoti; Con: Mark Jackman (4); Pen: Mark Jackman (2)

Eden Park, Auckland
Referee: Bryce Lawrence (New Zealand)

2 October 2010
14:35 NZST

Northland	33–45	Waikato
Try: Mateo Malupo; Lachie Munro; Cameron Eyre; Mikaele Tuu'u; Dean Budd; Con: Lachie Munro; Pen: Lachie Munro (2)	Report	Try: Brendon Leonard (2); Savenaca Tokula; Henry Speight; Stephen Donald; Con: Stephen Donald (4); Pen: Stephen Donald (4); Cards: Vern Kamo (yellow card)

Okara Park, Whangārei
Referee: Chris Pollock (New Zealand)

2 October 2010
17:30 NZST

Otago	20–35	Canterbury
Try: Joe Hill; Halani Aulika; Con: Glenn Dickson (2); Pen: Glenn Dickson (2)	Report	Try: Steve Fualau; Ryan Crotty; Sonny Bill Williams; Sean Maitland; Con: Colin Slade (3); Pen: Colin Slade (2); Drop: Andy Ellis

Carisbrook, Dunedin
Referee: Glen Jackson (New Zealand)

2 October 2010
19:35 NZST

Taranaki	23–6	Southland
Try: Jayden Hayward; Penalty try Con: Willie Ripia (2); Pen: Willie Ripia (3)	Report	Pen: Robbie Robinson (2)

Yarrow Stadium, New Plymouth
Referee: Garratt Williamson (New Zealand)

3 October 2010
14:35 NZST

Manawatu	20–8	Tasman
Try: Fraser Stone; Aaron Cruden; Con: Aaron Cruden (2); Pen: Aaron Cruden (2); Cards: Reece Robinson (yellow card)	Report	Try: Tom Marshall; Pen: James Marshall; Cards: Fai Mika (yellow card)

Arena Manawatu, Palmerston North
Referee: Matthew Stanish (New Zealand)

3 October 2010
16:35 NZST

Counties Manukau	24–23	North Harbour
Try: Tim Nanai-Williams (2); Tana Umaga; Con: Tim Nanai-Williams (2); Dean Cummins; Pen: Dean Cummins	Report	Try: Ben Afeaki; Chris Smylie; Nafi Tuitavake; Con: Mike Harris; Pen: Mike Harris (2)

Bayer Growers Stadium, Pukekohe
Referee: Jonathon White (New Zealand)

=== Week 11 ===
7 October 2010
19:35 NZST

Hawke's Bay	25–13	Northland
Try: Chris Eaton; Richard Buckman; Kahn Fotuali'i; Con: Mark Jackman (2); Pen: Mark Jackman (2)	Report	Try: Lachie Munro; Con: Lachie Munro; Pen: Lachie Munro (2)

McLean Park, Napier
Referee: Garratt Williamson (New Zealand)

8 October 2010
19:35 NZST

Waikato	41–15	Otago
Try: Stephen Donald (2); Henry Speight; Mils Muliaina; Savenaca Tokula; Con: Stephen Donald (5); Pen: Stephen Donald (2)	Report	Try: Alando Soakai; Sean Romans; Con: Glenn Dickson; Pen: Glenn Dickson; Cards: Halani Aulika (yellow card)

Waikato Stadium, Hamilton
Referee: Richard Kelly (New Zealand)

9 October 2010
14:35 NZST

Taranaki	30–16	Manawatu
Try: Scott Ireland; Andre Taylor; Jayden Hayward; Beauden Barrett; Con: Willie Ripia; Andre Taylor; Pen: Willie Ripia; Andre Taylor	Report	Try: Hamish Gosling; Con: Aaron Cruden; Pen: Aaron Cruden (3)

Yarrow Stadium, New Plymouth
Referee: Bryce Lawrence (New Zealand)

9 October 2010
17:30 NZST

Counties Manukau	13–37	Auckland
Try: Dean Cummins; Con: Dean Cummins; Pen: Dean Cummins (2)	Report	Try: Daniel Braid (2); Joe Rokocoko (2); Jerome Kaino; Con: Gareth Anscombe (2); Matt Berquist; Pen: Gareth Anscombe (2)

Bayer Growers Stadium, Pukekohe
Referee: Keith Brown (New Zealand)

9 October 2010
19:35 NZST

Southland	16–26	Canterbury – RS
Try: Kane Thompson; Con: Robbie Robinson; Pen: Robbie Robinson (2); James Wilson	Report	Try: Telusa Veainu; Colin Slade; Con: Colin Slade (2); Pen: Colin Slade (4)

Rugby Park Stadium, Invercargill
Referee: Chris Pollock (New Zealand)

10 October 2010
14:35 NZST

North Harbour	23–52	Wellington
Try: Ben Botica; Mat Luamanu; Con: Mike Harris (2); Pen: Mike Harris (3)	Report	Try: Alapati Leiua (2); John Schwalger; Alby Mathewson; Scott Fuglistaller; Jeremy Thrush; Julian Savea; Con: Piri Weepu (4); Pen: Piri Weepu (3)

North Harbour Stadium, Albany
Referee: Glen Jackson (New Zealand)

10 October 2010
16:35 NZST

Tasman	41–39	Bay of Plenty
Try: Kade Poki; Shane Christie; Robbie Malneek; Con: Tom Marshall; Pen: Tom Marshall (8)	Report	Try: Taniela Moa (2); Luke Braid; Grant McQuoid; Daniel Waenga; Lelia Masaga; Con: Mike Delany (3); Pen: Mike Delany

Lansdowne Park, Blenheim
Referee: James McPhail (New Zealand)

=== Week 12 ===
14 October 2010
19:35 NZST

Manawatu	25–27	Waikato
Try: Rob Foreman; Aaron Cruden; Michael Fitzgerald; Con: Aaron Cruden (2); Pen: Aaron Cruden (2)	Report	Try: Stephen Donald (2); Malcolm Barnes; Con: Stephen Donald (3); Pen: Stephen Donald (2)

Arena Manawatu, Palmerston North
Referee: Chris Pollock (New Zealand)

15 October 2010
19:35 NZST

Tasman	34–29	Northland
Try: Chris Jack; Blair Cook; Kade Poki; Fai Mika; Poutasi Luafutu; Con: Tom Marshall (3); Pen: Tom Marshall	Report	Try: Lachie Munro; Roy Griffin; Matt Wallis; Tim Dow; Con: Lachie Munro (3); Pen: Lachie Munro

Trafalgar Park, Nelson
Referee: Vinny Munro (New Zealand)

16 October 2010
14:35 NZST

Bay of Plenty	33–22	Southland
Try: Mike Delany; Lelia Masaga; Toby Arnold; Taniela Moa; Colin Bourke; Con: Mike Delany; Pen: Mike Delany (2); Cards: Josh Hohneck (yellow card)	Report	Try: James Wilson; Seminar Manu; Brayden Mitchell; Tim Dow; Con: James Wilson (2); Pen: James Wilson; Cards: Jamie Mackintosh (yellow card)

Baypark Stadium, Tauranga
Referee: Garratt Williamson (New Zealand)

16 October 2010
17:30 NZST

RS – Canterbury	39–21	Counties Manukau
Try: Robbie Fruean; Sonny Bill Williams; Telusa Veainu; Owen Franks; Penalty try Con: Stephen Brett (4); Pen: Stephen Brett (2)	Report	Try: Sikeli Nabou; Sherwin Stowers; Ahsee Tuala; Con: Dean Cummins (3)

Lancaster Park, Christchurch
Referee: Jonathon White (New Zealand)

16 October 2010
19:35 NZST

Wellington	49–15	Taranaki
Try: Alapati Leiua; Apoua Stewart; Alby Mathewson; Tajhon Mailata; Scott Fuglistaller; Ma'a Nonu; Charlie Ngatai; Con: Lima Sopoaga (3); Piri Weepu; Pen: Lima Sopoaga; Piri Weepu	Report	Try: Jayden Hayward; Scott Ireland; Con: Beauden Barrett; Pen: Willie Ripia

Wellington Regional Stadium, Wellington
Referee: Bryce Lawrence (New Zealand)

17 October 2010
14:35 NZST

Auckland	39–11	Otago
Try: Toby Morland; Isaia Toeava; Gareth Anscombe; Tom McCartney; Joe Rokocoko; Con: Gareth Anscombe (3); Matt Berquist; Pen: Gareth Anscombe (2)	Report	Try: Halani Aulika; Pen: Glenn Dickson (2)

Eden Park, Auckland
Referee: Kane McBride (New Zealand)

17 October 2010
16:35 NZST

Hawke's Bay	36–21	North Harbour
Try: Zac Guildford; Michael Johnson; Mike Coman; Ryan McLeod; Chris Eaton; Con: Richard Buckman (3); Mark Jackman; Pen: Richard Buckman; Cards: Mike Coman (yellow card); Clint Newland (yellow card)	Report	Try: Chris Smylie; Josh York; Con: Mike Harris; Pen: Mike Harris (3)

McLean Park, Napier
Referee: Keith Brown (New Zealand)

=== Week 13 ===
21 October 2010
19:35 NZST

Northland	36–24	Bay of Plenty
Try: David Holwell; Aaron Bancroft; Dean Budd; Rhyan Caine; Simon Munro; Con: Lachie Munro (4); Pen: Lachie Munro	Report	Try: Taniela Moa; Josh Hohneck; Grant McQuoid; Con: Mike Delany (2); Colin Bourke; Pen: Colin Bourke

Okara Park, Whangārei
Referee: Garratt Williamson (New Zealand)

22 October 2010
19:35 NZST

Waikato	26–6	Canterbury
Try: Alex Bradley; Sosene Anesi; Con: Trent Renata (2); Pen: Trent Renata (4)	Report	Pen: Colin Slade (2)

Waikato Stadium, Hamilton
Referee: Mike Fraser (New Zealand)

23 October 2010
14:35 NZST

North Harbour	47–49	Taranaki
Try: Mat Luamanu (3); James King (2); Chris Smylie; Con: Mike Harris (4); Pen: Mike Harris (3)	Report	Try: George Pisi (2); Jayden Hayward; Mahonri Schwalger; David Smith; Samuela Vunisa; Con: Beauden Barrett (5); Pen: Beauden Barrett (3)

North Harbour Stadium, Albany
Referee: Chris Pollock (New Zealand)

23 October 2010
17:30 NZST

Otago	24–46	Manawatu
Try: Alando Soakai; Paula Kinikinilau; Glenn Dickson; Con: Chris Noakes (2); Glenn Dickson; Pen: Chris Noakes	Report	Try: James Oliver; Craig Clare; Hadleigh Parkes; Rob Foreman; Lewis Marshall; Karl Bryson; Con: Aaron Cruden (2); Pen: Aaron Cruden (4)

Carisbrook, Dunedin
Referee: Shane McDermott (New Zealand)

23 October 2010
19:35 NZST

Southland	14–27	Wellington
Try: Glen Horton; James Wilson; Con: Robbie Robinson (2)	Report	Try: Tajhon Mailata; Alapati Leiua; Ged Robinson; Con: Lima Sopoaga (3); Pen: Lima Sopoaga (2)

Rugby Park Stadium, Invercargill
Referee: Bryce Lawrence (New Zealand)

24 October 2010
14:35 NZST

Auckland	49–10	Tasman
Try: Gareth Anscombe (3); Toby Morland; Brent Ward; Atieli Pakalani; Con: Gareth Anscombe (5); Pen: Gareth Anscombe (3)	Report	Try: Kade Poki; Con: Daniel Hawkins; Pen: James Marshall

Eden Park, Auckland
Referee: Nick Briant (New Zealand)

24 October 2010
16:35 NZST

Counties Manukau	28–31	Hawke's Bay
Try: Fritz Lee; Tim Nanai-Williams; DJ Forbes; Ahsee Tuala; Con: Tim Nanai-Williams; Pen: Tim Nanai-Williams (2)	Report	Try: Kahn Fotuali'i; Bryn Evans; Michael Johnson; Gillies Kaka; Con: Mark Jackman (3); Daniel Kirkpatrick; Pen: Mark Jackman

Bayer Growers Stadium, Pukekohe
Referee: Vinny Munro (New Zealand)

== Play-offs ==
Semi-finals
1	Canterbury	57
4	Wellington	41
2	Auckland	37
3	Waikato	38

Final
1	Canterbury	33
3	Waikato	13

=== Semi-finals ===
29 October 2010
19:35 NZST

Canterbury	57–41	Wellington
Try: Fualau 14' c Maitland 21' c Fruean 28' c Veainu (2) 38' c, 78' c Ross 75' c Con: Slade (6/6) 15', 22', 28', 39', 76', 79'; Pen: Slade (5/5) 6', 24', 55', 63', 66'	Report	Try: Savea 8' c Stewart 16' c Vito 57' m Perenara 70' c Con: Sopoaga (3/4) 9', 17', 71'; Pen: Sopoaga (5/5) 26', 29', 31', 39', 60'

Lancaster Park, Christchurch
Referee: Keith Brown (New Zealand)

30 October 2010
19:05 NZST

Auckland	37–38	Waikato
Try: Stanley 8' c Morland 34' c Faleali'i 58' c Raui 69' c Con: Anscombe (4/4) 9', 35', 59' 70'; Pen: Anscombe (3/6) 18', 53', 63'	Report	Try: Anesi 31' m Waqaniburotu 38' c Graham 45' m Speight 55' m Forbes 79' c Con: Renata (2/5) 39', 79'; Pen: Renata (3/4) 4', 26', 72'

Eden Park, Auckland
Referee: Chris Pollock (New Zealand)

=== Final ===
5 November 2010
19:35 NZST

Canterbury	33–13	Waikato
Try: Umaga-Marshall 3' m Crotty 38' m Todd 65' c Slade 71' c Con: Slade (2/4) 66', 72'; Pen: Slade (2/3) 22', 43'; Brett (1/1) 75'	Report	Try: Smith 12' m Speight 56' m Con: Renata (0/2); Pen: Renata (1/1) 25'

Lancaster Park, Christchurch
Referee: Jonathon White (New Zealand)

FB	15	Sean Maitland	(substituted off) 58'
RW	14	Tumatauenga Umaga-Marshall
OC	13	Robbie Fruean
IC	12	Ryan Crotty
LW	11	Telusa Veainu	(substituted off) 67'
FH	10	Colin Slade	(substituted off) 78'
SH	9	Willi Heinz
N8	8	Nasi Manu	(substituted off) 73'
OF	7	Matt Todd
BF	6	George Whitelock (c)
RL	5	Isaac Ross
LL	4	Luke Romano	(substituted off) 79'
TP	3	Peter Borlase	(substituted off) 76'
HK	2	Steve Fualau	(substituted off) 78'
LP	1	Wyatt Crockett
Replacements:
HK	16	Paul Ngauamo	(substituted on) 78'
PR	17	Andrew Olorenshaw	(substituted on) 76'
FL	18	Ash Parker	(substituted on) 73'
FL	19	Brendon O'Connor	(substituted on) 79'
SH	20	Takerei Norton	(substituted on) 78'
FH	21	Stephen Brett	(substituted on) 58'
FB	22	Sam Monaghan	(substituted on) 67'

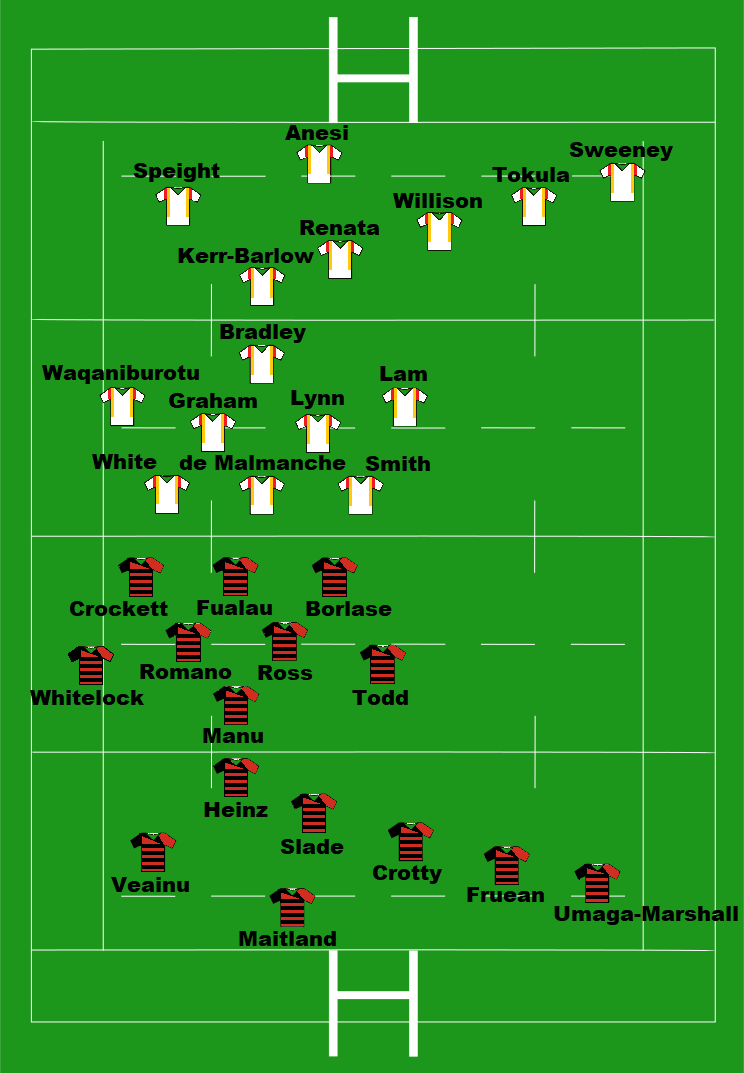

FB	15	Sosene Anesi
RW	14	Henry Speight	(substituted off) 67'
OC	13	Savenaca Tokula	(substituted off) 48'	(substituted on) 53'
IC	12	Jackson Willison			(substituted off) 67'
LW	11	Dwayne Sweeney
FH	10	Trent Renata
SH	9	Tawera Kerr-Barlow	(substituted off) 51'
N8	8	Alex Bradley	(substituted off) 58'
OF	7	Jack Lam
BF	6	Dominiko Waqaniburotu
RL	5	Romana Graham	(substituted off) 73'
LL	4	Toby Lynn
TP	3	Nathan White (c)
HK	2	Aled de Malmanche	(substituted off) 73'
LP	1	Toby Smith	(substituted off) 73'
Replacements:
HK	16	Hikairo Forbes	(substituted on) 73'
PR	17	Ben May	(substituted on) 73'
LK	18	Kent Fife	(substituted on) 73'
FL	19	Zak Hohneck	(substituted on) 58'
SH	20	Brendon Leonard	(substituted on) 51'
FH	21	Christian Lealiifano	(substituted on) 48'	(substituted off) 53'	(substituted on) 67'
WG	22	Tim Mikkelson	(substituted on) 67'

== Statistics ==
=== Leading point scorers ===
No.	Player	Team	Points	Average	Details
1	Lachie Munro	Northland	172	13.23	6 T, 32 C, 26 P, 0 D
2	Colin Slade	Canterbury	152	12.67	2 T, 29 C, 28 P, 0 D
3	Mike Harris	North Harbour	131	10.08	2 T, 23 C, 25 P, 0 D
4	Trent Renata	Waikato	116	8.29	1 T, 15 C, 27 P, 0 D
5	Robbie Robinson	Southland	114	8.77	0 T, 24 C, 21 P, 1 D
6	Matt Berquist	Auckland	109	7.79	1 T, 10 C, 28 P, 0 D
7	Willie Ripia	Taranaki	102	7.85	0 T, 21 C, 20 P, 0 D
8	Glenn Dickson	Otago	99	7.62	1 T, 14 C, 21 P, 1 D
9	Stephen Donald	Waikato	91	18.20	5 T, 15 C, 12 P, 0 D
10	Gareth Anscombe	Auckland	90	11.25	4 T, 17 C, 12 P, 0 D

Source: The weekly reviews of the matches published on provincial.rugby (see "Report" in the individual match scoring stats).

=== Leading try scorers ===
No.	Player	Team	Tries	Average
1	Lelia Masaga	Bay of Plenty	10	0.83
2	Robbie Fruean	Canterbury	10	0.71
3	Ahsee Tuala	Counties Manukau	9	0.69
4	Mat Luamanu	North Harbour	9	0.64
5	Telusa Veainu	Canterbury	9	0.60
6	Julian Savea	Wellington	8	0.67
7	Dean Budd	Northland	7	0.54
8	Jared Payne	Northland	7	0.54
9	Sean Maitland	Canterbury	7	0.47
10	Taniela Moa	Bay of Plenty	6	0.50

Source: The weekly reviews of the matches published on provincial.rugby (see "Report" in the individual match scoring stats).

=== Points by week ===
Team	1		2		3		4		5		6		7		8		9		10		11		12		13		Total		Average	
Auckland	36	14	18	21	11	6	26	13	16	35	27	13	21	15	32	6	6	9	34	34	37	13	39	11	49	10	352	200	27.10	15.40
Bay of Plenty	10	13	30	11	6	11	15	24	39	29	9	28	41	13	24	21	40	30	31	24	39	41	33	22	24	36	341	303	26.20	23.30
Canterbury	23	23	27	26	44	22	25	27	35	16	28	9	27	23	20	31	37	30	35	20	26	16	39	21	6	26	372	290	28.60	22.30
Counties Manukau	29	13	31	25	9	13	35	14	3	39	23	3	19	28	21	24	40	24	24	23	13	37	21	39	28	31	296	313	22.80	24.10
Hawke's Bay	23	23	11	30	7	21	20	23	17	9	16	17	27	27	13	17	32	24	34	34	25	13	36	21	31	28	292	287	22.50	22.10
Manawatu	23	37	26	27	8	77	14	35	9	17	36	24	13	41	6	32	30	44	20	8	16	30	25	27	46	24	272	423	20.90	32.50
North Harbour	14	36	25	24	22	44	35	23	29	39	27	36	21	47	28	21	44	30	23	24	23	52	21	36	47	49	359	461	27.60	35.50
Northland	26	19	24	25	77	8	13	26	28	31	33	22	23	27	13	8	24	40	33	45	13	25	29	34	36	24	372	334	28.60	25.70
Otago	13	29	12	16	22	35	23	35	15	25	17	16	13	11	8	13	30	40	20	35	15	41	11	39	24	46	223	381	17.20	29.30
Southland	37	23	16	12	13	9	23	20	21	16	22	33	47	21	7	6	9	6	6	23	16	26	22	33	14	27	253	255	19.50	19.60
Taranaki	19	26	33	11	33	23	24	15	25	15	13	27	28	19	31	20	24	32	23	6	30	16	15	49	49	47	347	306	26.70	23.50
Tasman	11	20	11	33	21	7	27	25	16	21	3	23	11	13	21	28	15	33	8	20	41	39	34	29	10	49	229	340	17.60	26.20
Waikato	13	10	21	18	23	33	14	26	39	3	36	27	27	27	6	7	33	15	45	33	41	15	27	25	26	6	351	245	27.00	18.80
Wellington	20	11	25	31	35	22	26	14	31	28	24	36	15	21	17	13	30	37	24	31	52	23	49	15	27	14	375	296	28.80	22.80

Source: ITM Cup Fixtures and Results 2010

=== Tries by week ===
width=16% Team	1		2		3		4		5		6		7		8		9		10		11		12		13		Total		Average	
Auckland	4	1	2	2	1	0	2	1	1	4	2	1	2	0	4	0	0	0	3	4	5	1	5	1	6	1	37	16	2.80	1.20
Bay of Plenty	1	1	5	1	0	1	2	3	6	4	0	3	6	1	3	2	5	3	3	2	6	3	5	3	3	5	45	32	3.50	2.50
Canterbury	2	1	4	4	7	3	3	3	4	1	3	0	3	2	2	5	4	4	4	2	2	1	5	3	0	2	43	31	3.30	2.40
Counties Manukau	4	1	3	3	0	1	5	2	0	5	2	0	1	3	2	3	5	3	3	3	1	5	3	5	4	4	33	38	2.50	2.90
Hawke's Bay	1	2	1	5	1	3	3	2	1	0	1	2	2	4	1	3	4	4	4	3	3	1	5	2	4	4	31	35	2.40	2.70
Manawatu	2	5	4	4	1	10	2	5	0	1	4	4	1	6	0	4	4	5	2	1	1	4	3	3	6	3	30	55	2.30	4.20
North Harbour	1	4	1	3	3	7	2	2	4	6	3	4	3	7	3	2	5	4	3	3	2	7	2	5	6	6	38	60	2.90	4.60
Northland	3	1	3	1	10	1	1	2	3	5	4	3	2	3	1	1	3	5	5	5	1	3	4	5	5	3	45	38	3.50	2.90
Otago	1	4	0	1	3	4	2	2	2	3	2	1	1	1	1	1	3	5	2	4	2	5	1	5	3	6	23	42	1.80	3.20
Southland	5	2	1	0	1	0	2	3	0	1	3	4	7	3	1	0	0	0	0	2	1	2	3	5	2	3	26	25	2.00	1.90
Taranaki	1	3	5	1	3	2	3	2	3	2	1	2	3	1	5	2	4	4	2	0	4	1	2	7	6	6	42	33	3.20	2.50
Tasman	1	3	1	5	3	1	3	3	1	0	0	2	1	1	2	3	2	3	1	2	3	6	5	4	1	6	24	39	1.80	3.00
Waikato	1	1	2	2	2	3	1	3	5	0	4	3	4	2	0	1	3	2	5	5	5	2	3	3	2	0	37	27	2.80	2.10
Wellington	3	1	3	3	4	3	3	1	5	3	4	4	0	2	3	1	4	4	2	3	7	2	7	2	3	2	48	31	3.70	2.40

For	Against

Source: The weekly reviews of the matches published on provincial.rugby (see "Report" in the individual match scoring stats).

== Ranfurly Shield ==
=== Pre-season challenges ===
9 July 2010
19:35 NZST

Southland	48–3	North Otago
Try: Wilson 23' c Tuineau 44' c Paterson 49' c Dixon 54' c Wells 61' m Mackintosh 73' c Horton 79' m Con: Wilson (5/7) 24', 45', 50', 55', 74'; Pen: Wilson (1/1) 3'	Report	Pen: Patston (1/1) 4'

Rugby Park Stadium, Invercargill
Attendance: 4,200
Referee: Vinny Munro (New Zealand)

23 July 2010
19:35 NZST

Southland	62–6	Wanganui
Try: Horton (2) 8' c, 66' c Dixon 39' c Wells (2) 40' c, 60' c Mitchell 42' m Koonwaiyou 45' c Mackintosh 55' m McGrath 73' m Rutledge 78' m Con: Robinson (6/10) 9', 40', 41', 46', 61', 67	Report	Pen: Davis (1/1) 3'; Drop: Davis (1/2) 7'; Cards: Cranston (yellow card) 37'

Rugby Park Stadium, Invercargill
Attendance: 4,000
Referee: Josh Noonan (New Zealand)

== See also ==
- 2010 Heartland Championship
