= List of New Zealand rugby sevens internationals =

This is a list of New Zealand rugby union players who have played for the New Zealand national rugby sevens team. The team is one of the most successful rugby sevens teams of all time. The team was coached for many years by Gordon Tietjens. As of 26 November 2011, 37 of these players have gone on to be All Blacks. The side has won 4 Gold Medals and were undefeated in the Commonwealth Games until 2014.

On 24 March 2011, Coach Tietjens picked his 'fantasy team' composed of the best players he believes to have played for New Zealand.

| • Jonah Lomu | • Eric Rush |
| • Christian Cullen | • Dallas Seymour |
| • Karl Te Nana | • Liam Messam |
| • Amasio Valence | • DJ Forbes |

== List ==
| Name | Province | Years active | Notes |
|---|---|---|---|
| Charles Piutau | Auckland | 2011–present | |
| Joe Rokocoko | Auckland | 2002, 2005 | |
| Onosai Tololima-Auva'a | Auckland | 2006–2009 | Commonwealth Games Gold 2006 |
| Edwin Cocker | Auckland | 2005–2009 | |
| Jerome Kaino | Auckland | 2005 | |
| Amasio Valence | Auckland | 1998–2008 | Commonwealth Games Gold 1998, 2002, 2006 |
| Scott Curry | Bay of Plenty | 2010–2011 | |
| Charles Baxter | Bay of Plenty | 2005-2009 | |
| Toby Arnold | Bay of Plenty | 2009-2011 | Commonwealth Games Gold 2010 |
| Tanerau Latimer | Bay of Plenty | 2004–2006 | Commonwealth Games Gold 2006 |
| Tu Umaga-Marshall | Canterbury | 2006–2009 | |
| Dallas Seymour | Canterbury | 1992–2002 | Commonwealth Games Gold 1998 |
| DJ Forbes | Counties Manukau | 2006–present | Commonwealth Games Gold 2010 |
| Jonah Lomu | Counties Manukau | 1994–2001 | Commonwealth Games Gold 1998 |
| Tim Nanai-Williams | Counties Manukau | 2008 | |
| Lachie Munro | Auckland | 2006 | |
| Chad Tuoro | Counties Manukau | 2008 | |
| Sherwin Stowers | Counties Manukau | 2004–2010 | Commonwealth Games Gold 2010 |
| Fritz Lee | Counties Manukau | 2010 | |
| Gillies Kaka | Hawke's Bay | 2013–Present | |
| Trinity Spooner-Neera | Hawke's Bay | 2013 | |
| Zac Guildford | Hawke's Bay | 2010 | Commonwealth Games Gold 2010 |
| Tafai Ioasa | Hawke's Bay | 2001–2007 | Commonwealth Games Gold 2006 |
| Israel Dagg | Hawke's Bay | 2007–2008 | |
| Tomasi Cama | Manawatu | 2005–present | Commonwealth Games Gold 2010 |
| Kurt Baker | Manawatu | 2008–2010 | Commonwealth Games Gold 2010 |
| Solomon King | North Harbour | 2006–present | |
| Rico Gear | North Harbour | 1998–2000 | Commonwealth Games Gold 1998 |
| Karl Te Nana | North Harbour | 1996-2003 | Commonwealth Games Gold 2002 |
| Eric Rush | North Harbour | 1988–2004 | Commonwealth games Gold 1998 |
| David Raikuna | North Harbour | | |
| Matua Parkinson | North Harbour | 1999–2004 | |
| Vilame Waqaseduadua | North Harbour | 2005 | |
| Anthony Tuitavake | North Harbour | 2002–2003 | Commonwealth Games Gold 2002 |
| Nafi Tuitavake | North Harbour | 2008–2010 | |
| Zar Lawrence | North Harbour | 2005–2010 | |
| Brent Wilson | North Harbour | 2005 | |
| Bryce Heem | Northland | | |
| Rene Ranger | Northland | 2006–2008 | |
| Josh Blackie | Otago | 2002–2006 | Commonwealth Games Gold 2006 |
| Ben Smith | Otago | | Commonwealth Games Gold 2010 |
| Alando Soakai | Otago | 2006–2007 | Commonwealth Games Gold 2006 |
| Paul Grant | Otago | 2010 | |
| Adam Thomson | Otago | 2007 | |
| Ben Souness | Taranaki | 2009–present | Commonwealth Games Gold 2010 |
| Jackson Ormond | Taranaki | 2009–2010 | |
| Beauden Barrett | Taranaki | 2010 | |
| Kylem O'Donnell | Taranaki | 2011–present | |
| Scott Waldrom | Taranaki | 2002–2007 | |
| James Marshall | Tasman | 2011 | |
| Shane Christie | Tasman | 2010 | |
| Tim Mikkelson | Waikato | 2008–present | Commonwealth Games Gold 2010 |
| Frank Halai | Waikato | 2010–present | |
| Glen Robertson | Waikato | 2011–present | |
| Joe Webber | Waikato | 2011–present | |
| Declan O'Donnell | Waikato | 2010–2011 | |
| Liam Messam | Waikato | 2003–2010 | Commonwealth Games Gold 2006, 2010 |
| Bruce Reihana | Waikato | 1998, 2002 | Commonwealth Games Gold 1998, 2002 |
| Sosene Anesi | Waikato | 2004–2006 | Commonwealth Games Gold 2006 |
| Rory Grice | Waikato | 2010 | |
| Waisake Masirewa | Waikato | 1995–1997 | |
| Luke Masirewa | Waikato | 2013 | |
| Mils Muliaina | Waikato | 1999–2002 | Commonwealth Games Gold 2002 |
| Savenaca Tokula | Waikato | 2009–2010 | |
| Roger Randle | Waikato | 1995–2002 | Commonwealth Games Gold 1998, 2002 |
| Lote Raikabula | Wellington | 2006–present | Commonwealth Games Gold 2006, 2010 |
| Christian Cullen | Wellington | 1995–1998 | Commonwealth Games Gold 1998 |
| Hosea Gear | Wellington | 2010 | Commonwealth Games Gold 2010 |
| Cory Jane | Wellington | 2006 | Commonwealth Games Gold 2006 |
| Tamati Ellison | Wellington | 2005–2006 | Commonwealth Games Gold 2006 |
| Brad Fleming | Wellington | 1999–2002 | Commonwealth Games Gold 2002 |
| Nigel Hunt | Wellington | 2005–2007 | Commonwealth Games Gold 2006 |
| Buxton Popoali'i | Wellington | 2009–2011 | |
| Victor Vito | Wellington | 2007–2008 | |
| Julian Savea | Wellington | 2009 | |
| Rodney So'oialo | Wellington | 2001–2002 | Commonwealth Games Gold 2002 |
| Ruki Tipuna | Wellington | 2010 | |
| Taleta Tupuola | Wellington | 2010 | |
