= Frontier justice (disambiguation) =

Frontier justice usually refers to extrajudicial punishment that is motivated by the nonexistence of law and order or dissatisfaction with justice.

Frontier Justice may also refer to:

- Frontier Justice (film) a 1935 film
- Frontier Justice (TV series), a 1950s–60s CBS television series
- Frontier Justice: A History of the Gulf Country to 1900, a 2005 book by Australian historian Tony Roberts
- Frontier Justice: Weapons of Mass Destruction and the Bushwhacking of America, a 2003 book by Scott Ritter

== See also ==
- Summary justice (disambiguation)
- Vigilantism
