= Chad Tuoro =

New Zealand rugby union player

- Born: Chad Tuoro; 27 May 1981 (age 45) Auckland, New Zealand
- Height: 1.86 m (6 ft 1 in)
- Weight: 90 kg (14 st 2 lb; 200 lb)

Rugby union career
- Position: Halfback
Provincial / State sides
Years	Team	Apps	(Points)
2007-2008	C. Manukau		(5)
2010	Bay of Plenty	12	(5)
- Correct as of 21 October 2010
National sevens team
Years	Team		Comps
2008-2009	New Zealand 7s		10
- Correct as of 27 May 2009
Coaching career
- Years: Team
- 2013-Present: Cook Islands 7s

Chad Tuoro is a New Zealand Rugby union player who plays for the New Zealand Sevens team. Saint Kentigern College Old Collegian, Head of Bruce House

== International career ==
=== Sevens ===
Chad Tuoro is an experienced player who had an impressive national tournament for his province

— Gordon Tietjens, New Zealand sevens coach

Chad Tuoro was selected in the New Zealand Sevens squad of 13 for the third tournament of the 2007/2008 IRB World Sevens Series in Wellington. He was the only one potential debutant amongst the group. But Nigel Hunt had passed a fitness test, it meant that Chad would miss out on the tournament. At age 26, Tuoro went on to make his international debut for the side in Hong Kong along with North Harbour winger Nafi Tuitavake. In 2008 he made a further three appearances in Adelaide and the final two tournaments in London and Edinburgh as he replaced Solomon King because of injury.

Tuoro started 2009 off in San Diego having replaced Tomasi Cama and Edwin Cocker. He continued to be a key contributor for New Zealand, appearing in Hong Kong, Adelaide, London, Edinburgh and including the 2009 Rugby World Cup, recording 2 tries against Italy and Tonga.

== Career highlights ==
=== Rugby Sevens ===
- Auckland (2005, 2006, 2007 Pub Charity Sevens)
- Counties Manukau (2008, 2009 Pub Charity Sevens)
- New Zealand (2008, 2009 IRB Sevens World Series)

=== Rugby Union ===
- Counties Manukau (2007, 2008 Air New Zealand Cup)
- Bay of Plenty (2010 ITM Cup)
