= Patrick Joseph O'Connor =

Patrick Joseph O'Connor may refer to:

- Patrick O'Connor (Australian politician) (1862–1923)
- Padraic Fiacc (1924–2019), Irish poet
- Pat O'Connor (American football) (born 1993), American football player
- Patrick O'Connor (bishop) (1848–1932), Irish-born Roman Catholic bishop in Australia

== See also ==
- Patrick O'Connor (disambiguation)
