= Pat O'Connor =

Pat O'Connor may refer to:

== Sportspeople ==
- Pat O'Connor (Australian footballer, born 1881) (1881–1956), Australian rules footballer for St Kilda
- Pat O'Connor (Scottish footballer) (fl. 1958–1967), Kilmarnock FC player
- Pat O'Connor (wrestler) (1924–1990), wrestler from New Zealand
- Pat O'Connor (hurler) (born 1965), Irish retired hurler
- Pat O'Connor (referee), Irish hurling referee
- Pat O'Connor (rugby union) (born 1985), former Australian rugby union player for the Western Force and Waratahs
- Pat O'Connor (racing driver) (1928–1958), American racecar driver
- Pat O'Connor (boxer) (1950–2025), American light heavyweight boxer
- Pat O'Connor (American football) (born 1995), American football player

== Others ==
- Pat O'Connor (director) (born 1943), Irish film director of Sweet November
- Pat O'Connor (politician) (born 1960), American politician in Missouri

== See also ==
- Pat O'Conner (born 1958), baseball executive and 11th president of Minor League Baseball
- Patrick O'Connor (disambiguation)
- Patricia O'Connor (disambiguation)
