= Patrick O'Connor =

Patrick O'Connor may refer to:

== Arts and entertainment ==
- Patrick O'Connor (painter) (1909–1997), American painter
- Leonard Wibberley (a.k.a. Patrick O'Connor, 1915–1983), Irish novelist
- Padraic Fiacc (Patrick Joseph O'Connor, 1924–2019), Irish poet

== Law and politics ==
- Patrick O'Connor (Australian politician) (1862–1923)
- Patrick O'Connor (judge) (1914–2001), British judge
- Patrick J. O'Connor (born 1955), American politician in Chicago
- Patrick O'Connor (Massachusetts politician) (born 1984), American politician

== Sports ==
- Patrick O'Connor (rugby union) (1863–1919), Irish international rugby union player
- Paddy O'Connor (1879–1950), Irish-born American baseball player
- Patrick John O'Connor (1924–1990), New Zealand wrestler
- Patrick O'Connor (sprinter) (born 1966), Jamaican sprinter
- Patrick O'Connor (hurler) (born 1991), Irish hurler
- Patrick O'Connor (American football) (born 1993), American football defensive end

== Others ==
- Patrick O'Connor (bishop) (1848–1932), Irish-born Roman Catholic bishop in Australia
- Patrick Edward O'Connor (1932–2014), New Zealand Roman Catholic priest
- Patrick O'Connor (died 1849), the victim of murderer Marie Manning and her husband

== See also ==
- Hanging of Patrick O'Connor
- Pat O'Connor (disambiguation)
- Patrick Connor (disambiguation)
