= Patrick Connor =

Patrick Connor may refer to:

- Patrick Edward Connor (1820–1891), Union general during the American Civil War
- Patrick Connor (Irish politician) (1906–1989), Irish Fine Gael Party Senator and TD for Kerry South
- Patrick Connor (actor) (1926–2008), British actor

== See also ==
- Patrick O'Connor (disambiguation)
