= Summary justice =

Summary justice may refer to:

- Handling of summary offenses
- Frontier justice, also called "vigilante justice"
- Vigilantism or vigilante justice
- Summary execution, execution of a person upon their being accused of a crime, without a full and fair trial; usually pejorative

== See also ==
- Summary judgment, judgment entered by a judge or jury for one party and against another, without a full trial. Often a pretrial dismissal of an entire case. Sometimes a ruling on discrete issues in a case. Not pejorative.
