= Halani Aulika =

Tonga international rugby union player

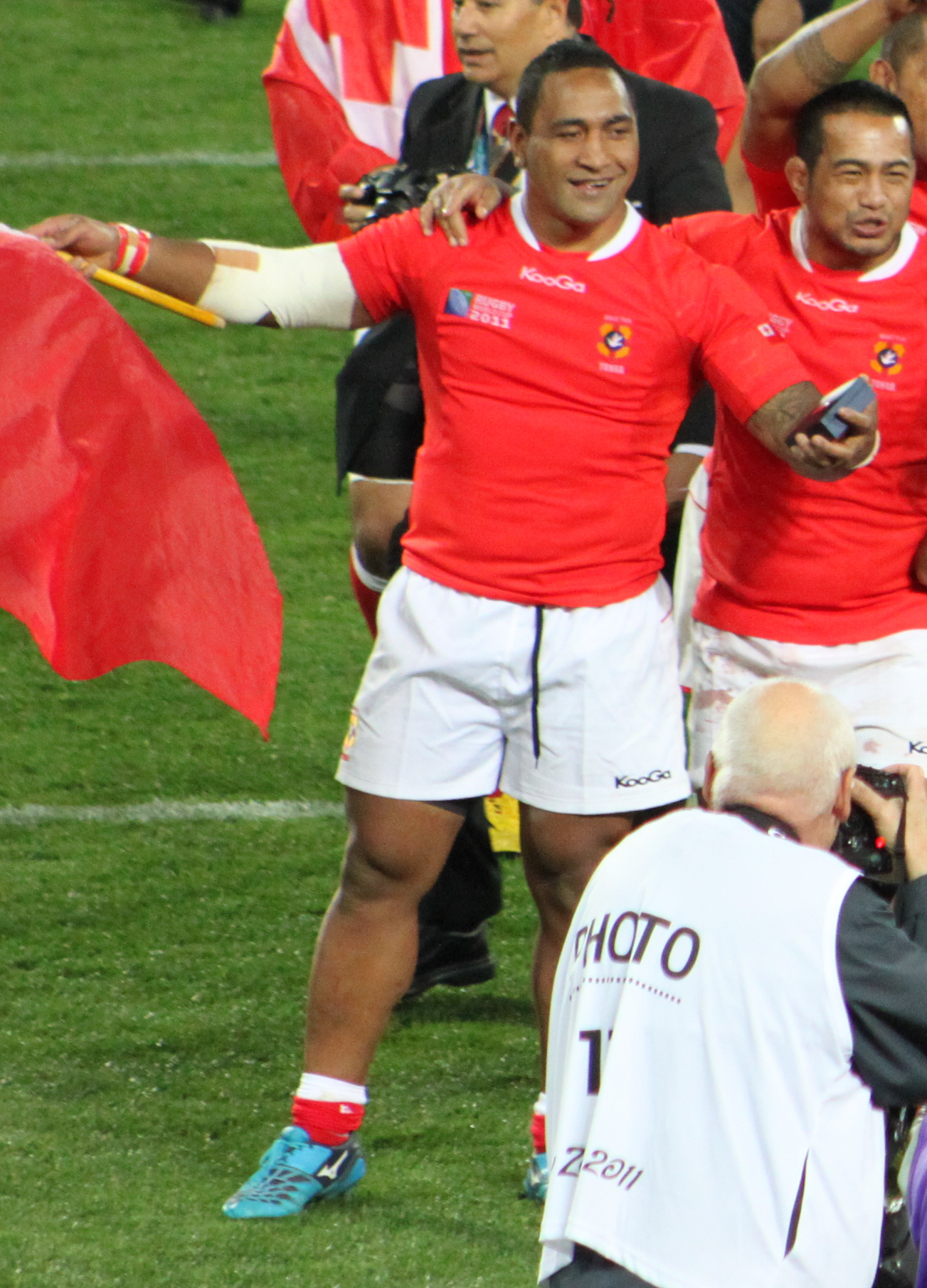
- Born: 31 August 1983 (age 43) Tonga
- Height: 1.85 m (6 ft 1 in)
- Weight: 122 kg (19 st 3 lb)

Rugby union career
- Position: Tighthead Prop
Senior career
Years	Team	Apps	(Points)
2011–2012	Leeds	8	(5)
2012–2016	London Irish	92	(115)
2016–2018	Sale Sharks	53	(20)
2018–2019	Grenoble	14	(0)
- Correct as of 6 May 2018
Provincial / State sides
Years	Team	Apps	(Points)
2010–2011	Otago	15	(25)
- Correct as of 24 August 2015
Super Rugby
Years	Team	Apps	(Points)
2011	Highlanders	1	(0)
- Correct as of 24 August 2015
International career
Years	Team	Apps	(Points)
2011-	Tonga	18	(5)

Halani Aulika (born 31 August 1983) is a rugby union prop from Tonga who plays for Top 14 side Grenoble.

== Playing career ==
=== Provincial Rugby ===
Born in Tonga, Aulika emigrated to New Zealand in 2000 at the age of 17. After finishing school, he was a fixture in Auckland club rugby for several years but was unable to break into the Auckland provincial side. Short of opportunities in Auckland, he transferred to Otago for the 2010 ITM Cup.

After serving a three-match ban for an incident in club rugby, he quickly established himself as one of the side's starting props alongside former All Black Kees Meeuws. In 10 appearances, he scored a team-leading five tries and established himself as one of the best attacking props in the competition.

In the 2011 ITM Cup, Aulika appeared in the first five matches of the season for Otago before leaving to take up his international duties for Tonga ahead of the 2011 Rugby World Cup.

=== Super Rugby ===
Following his successful season with Otago, Aulika earned himself a contract with the Highlanders for the 2011 Super Rugby season. Serving as a depth prop for the squad, he made his only appearance of the season as a substitute in the club's win over the Brumbies on 1 April.

=== Aviva Premiership ===
Aulika signed a two-year contract with London Irish in March, 2012 and then later joined the club in July 2012. At the conclusion of the 2015–16 season it was confirmed that Aulika was to leave London Irish and join Sale Sharks the following season.

=== Top 14 ===
At the end of the 2017–18 English Premiership season, it was announced that Aulika would be moving to French Top 14 side Grenoble.
