= Patricia O'Connor =

Patricia O'Connor may refer to:

- Patricia O'Connor (camogie), camogie player who played in 1949 All-Ireland Senior Camogie Championship
- Patricia O'Connor (educator) (born 1940), founder of Fashion Careers College, San Diego, California
- Patricia O'Connor (elder) (born 1928), Australian Aboriginal elder
- Patricia O'Connor (soccer) (born 1941), Australian soccer player
- Patricia O'Connor (nurse), Canadian nurse who organised medical evacuations with Adlair Aviation
- Patricia O'Connor (playwright) (1905–1983), Irish playwright, novelist and teacher
- Patricia O'Connor (veterinarian) (1914–2003), American veterinarian
- Patricia O'Connor, murdered Irishwoman, see Murder of Patricia O'Connor

== See also ==
- Pat O'Connor (disambiguation)
