= Robbie Fruean =

NZ rugby union player

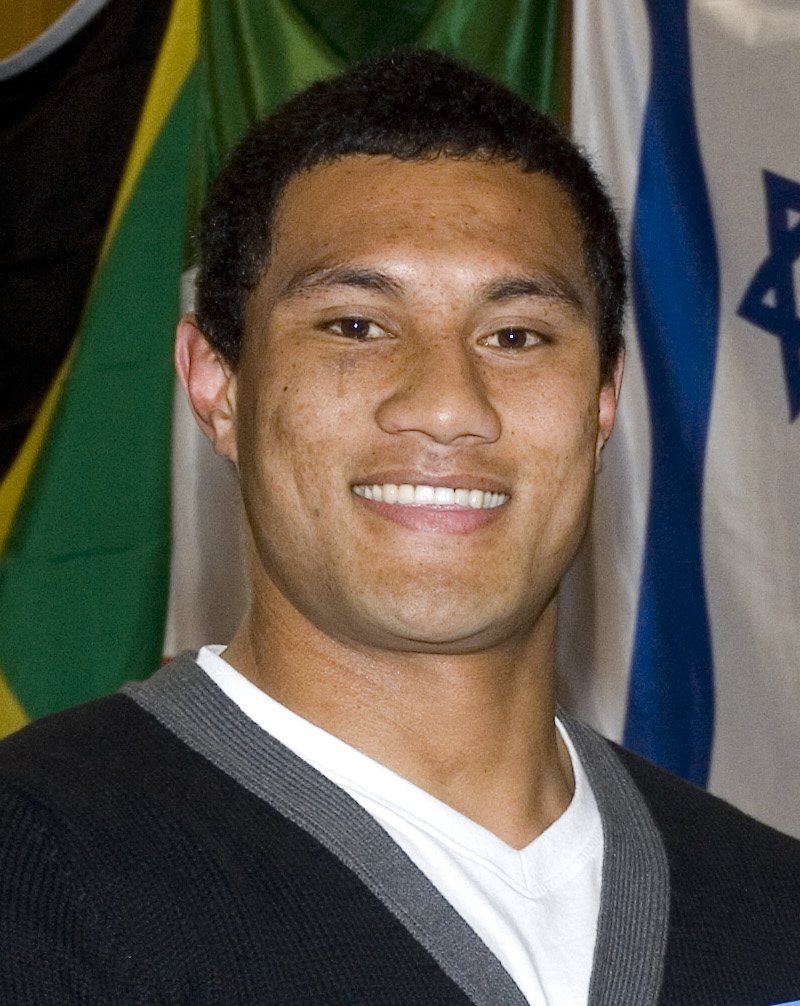
- Fruean in 2010
- Born: Robert Lakopo Fruean; 13 July 1988 (age 38) Wellington, New Zealand
- Height: 1.90 m (6 ft 3 in)
- Weight: 104 kg (16 st 5 lb)
- School: Porirua College
- University: Lincoln University
- Occupation: Professional rugby player.

Rugby union career
- Position(s): Centre, Wing
- Current team: Edinburgh
Senior career
Years	Team	Apps	(Points)
2007–2009	Wellington	15	(15)
2009	Hurricanes	1	(0)
2010–2013,2015	Crusaders	66	(75)
2010–2012	Canterbury	37	(105)
2014	Chiefs	4	(5)
2014–2016	Hawke's Bay	25	(45)
2016,2017	Bath	6	(15)
2017,2018	Edinburgh	5	(15)
- Correct as of 20 October 2018
International career
Years	Team	Apps	(Points)
2009	Junior All Blacks	3	(5)
2011	Barbarian F.C.	1	(0)

Robert Lakopo Fruean (/ˈfruːən/; born 13 July 1988, in Wellington) is a retired New Zealand rugby union footballer. He is a midfield back and plays outside centre (13) and sometimes on the wing. He is a former Porirua College head boy. He is of Samoan & Cook islands heritage.

In 2007, he made the NZ team for the 2007 Under 19 Rugby World Championship. He led New Zealand to a championship win beating South Africa in the final. He also won the IRB Under-19 Player of the Year the same year.

He made his National Provincial Championship debut for Wellington against Auckland. He played 12 games for them scoring three tries before getting struck by illness. He subsequently underwent open-heart surgery for rheumatic heart disease, a potentially life-threatening inflammation of the heart.

In 2009 returned to rugby, making his Super 14 debut for the Hurricanes against Blues. This was his first and last game for the Hurricanes after which he defected to the Crusaders and played for them in the 2010 Super 14 season and the 2011 Super Rugby season.

He made his 2010 ITM Cup debut for Canterbury, scoring two tries against Manawatu. The next week Fruean scored three more against North Harbour. He finished the season tied as the top try scorer with Lelia Masaga with 10 tries. In 2012, on the back of his third season with Canterbury, he was named ITM Cup player of the year at the New Zealand Rugby Awards.

He signed for Hawkes Bay Magpies in the ITM Cup in a two-year deal, starting from 2014. On 27 September 2016, Fruean signed for English club Bath in the Aviva Premiership from the 2016–17 season. In June 2017, Fruean joined Scottish Pro14 side Edinburgh on a two-year contract, ahead of the 2017–18 season.

== Post-retirement ==
Fruen became the Hillmorton High School’s First XV coach and director of rugby in 2022. As of 2023, Fruen established and coached the Horomaka Combined First XV, which includes players from Hillmorton, Hornby, Riccarton and Middleton Grange schools and Hagley Community College. This combination team enables players from those schools to play First XV school rugby while staying at their schools.
