= Matt Berquist =

New Zealand rugby union footballer (born 1983)

Mathew Berquist
- Born: Mathew Berquist; 11 May 1983 (age 43) Waipukurau, New Zealand
- Height: 1.82 m (5 ft 11 1/2 in)
- Weight: 88 kg (13 st 12 lb)
- University: University of Otago
- Occupation: Rugby player

Rugby union career
- Position: Out Half
Senior career
Years	Team	Apps	(Points)
2011–2012	Leinster	2	(3)
2012–2013	Biarritz	4	(6)
2013–2014	Treviso	20	(164)
Provincial / State sides
Years	Team	Apps	(Points)
2003–2004	Otago	11	(82)
2006–2009	Hawke's Bay	42	(415)
2010	Auckland	10	(109)
2014–2015	Hawke's Bay	9	(8)
- Correct as of 24 October 2014
Super Rugby
Years	Team	Apps	(Points)
2009–2010	Highlanders	18	(76)
2011	Crusaders	11	(70)

Matt Berquist (born 11 May 1983 in Waipukurau, New Zealand) is a rugby union player who plays at fly-half for Benetton Rugby Treviso in the Rabodirect Pro12.

== Playing career ==
=== Provincial Rugby ===
Berquist attended the University of Otago and represented Otago in 2003 and 2004.

In 2005, he transferred to Hawke's Bay where he would blossom as a player, helping the Magpies turnaround from perennial struggles to Air New Zealand Cup semi-finalists in 2008 and 2009. During this time, Berquist earned a reputation as one of the best goal-kickers in the competition, finishing as the Cup's leading scorer in 2009.

For the 2010 ITM Cup, Berquist transferred to Auckland. He again topped 100 points in the competition, including finally scoring his first provincial try in his 8th season in the competition.

=== Super Rugby ===
Berquist was initially a member of the Highlanders in 2004 while still playing for Otago, but he failed to see action in a single game.

Berquist's strong performances for Hawke's Bay earned him a Super 14 contract with the Highlanders for the 2009 season. After starting the season as a bench player, he started 6 of the final 7 matches of the season at his preferred position of fly-half. He shared goal-kicking duties with Daniel Bowden and finished the season with 49 points, including his first try in Super Rugby.

For 2010, Berquist faced increased competition for the starting fly-half position with the Highlanders from Michael Hobbs and Robbie Robinson, although he still managed to match his 2009 total with 6 starts. His goal-kicking opportunities decreased from 2009 due to the emergence of Israel Dagg as one of the top goal-kickers in Super 14.

In 2011, Berquist was back up for Dan Carter at the Crusaders.

=== European Rugby ===
Berquist signed for Leinster Rugby for the 2011–12 Pro12 season. He was to play back up to Johnny Sexton. He spent almost his entire first season injured which allowed Ian Madigan to emerge in his absence. His contract was not renewed after his first season.

He joined Biarritz in the summer of 2012 but similarly struggled to get any game action. Berquist joined Benetton Treviso in the summer of 2013.
