= Telusa Veainu =

Tonga international rugby union player (born 1990)

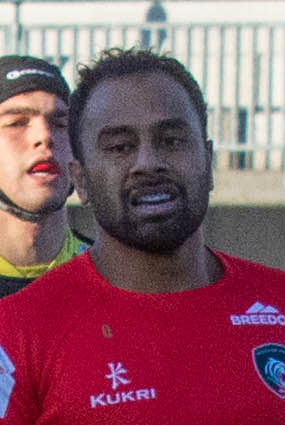
- Born: Koloti Telusa Pelaki Veainu; 26 December 1990 (age 35) Kawakawa, New Zealand
- Height: 1.80 m (5 ft 11 in)
- Weight: 85 kg (13 st 5 lb; 187 lb)
- School: St Andrew's College
- Notable relative: Langi Veainu (sister)

Rugby union career
- Position: Outside Back
- Current team: Doncaster Knights
Senior career
Years	Team	Apps	(Points)
2010–2012	Canterbury	34	(105)
2011–2012	Highlanders	4	(0)
2013	Hawke's Bay	11	(35)
2013	Crusaders	4	(5)
2014	Melbourne Rising	6	(43)
2014–2015	Rebels	7	(15)
2015–2020	Leicester Tigers	80	(160)
2020–2023	Stade Français	42	(50)
2023–2024	Sale Sharks	7	(5)
2024–	Doncaster Knights	0	(0)
2010–	Total	145	(363)
- Correct as of 21 January 2024
International career
Years	Team	Apps	(Points)
2010	New Zealand U20		
2015-	Tonga	16	(45)
- Correct as of 12 July 2025

Koloti Telusa Pelaki Veainu (born 26 December 1990) is a rugby union player. He plays at fullback or on the wing for Doncaster Knights. He was born and raised in New Zealand, but he represents Tonga internationally. He is known for his speed, elusiveness and strength from fullback, earning him a place in Will Greenwood's Daily Telegraph team of the year for 2016/17.

== Club career ==
=== Provincial Rugby ===
Born in Kawakawa, New Zealand, Veainu went to St Andrew's College in Christchurch where in his final year of school he was made captain of the 1st XV. He was a regular in Canterbury age group sides over the years, making the under 16's, 18's and 19's whilst still at school. Veainu was a star on the wing for the NZ U-20s at the World Cup in Argentina where he scored five tries (including three in the final).

Selected to the Canterbury squad for the 2010 ITM Cup, Veainu made his debut off the bench against Hawke's Bay and subsequently started in every match, scoring eight tries as Canterbury won the championship. Playing with Canterbury again for the 2011 ITM Cup, Veainu scored a further 5 tries in 11 games, in the process helping Canterbury win their fourth consecutive title.

For the 2013 ITM Cup, Veainu moved north to join Hawke's Bay and scored 7 tries in 11 matches for the Magpies.

Following his move to Australia to join the Melbourne Rebels, Veainu turned out for the Melbourne Rising in 2014, scoring 8 tries from just 6 starts.

=== Super Rugby ===
After a solid ITM Cup season in 2010, Veainu received a contract to play for the Highlanders for the 2011 Super Rugby season. He made his debut in the Highlanders win over the Bulls in week 3 of the competition. He was again named in the Highlanders squad for 2012, but did not appear in any matches.

For the 2013 Super Rugby season Veainu returned to his home province to sign with the Crusaders, but again struggled to duplicate his ITM Cup form, appearing in only 4 games as a substitute. His season, however, was highlighted by his first Super Rugby try against the Highlanders, his former squad, on 29 June.

On 17 September 2013, Veainu signed with the Melbourne Rebels for the 2014 and 2015 seasons. In May 2014, playing on the wing, he scored a runaway try for the Rebels in their loss to the Waratahs at home in Melbourne.

==== Super Rugby statistics ====
As of 15 June 2015

Season	Team	Games	Starts	Sub	Mins	Tries	Cons	Pens	Drops	Points	Yel	Red
2011	Highlanders	5	1	4	119	0	0	0	0	0	0	0
2012	Highlanders	0	0	0	0	0	0	0	0	0	0	0
2013	Crusaders	4	0	4	28	1	0	0	0	5	0	0
2014	Rebels	5	2	3	217	2	0	0	0	10	0	0
2015	Rebels	2	0	2	66	1	0	0	0	5	0	0
Total		16	3	13	430	4	0	0	0	20	0	0

=== Leicester Tigers ===
It was confirmed on 28 October 2015 that Veainu has joined English Premiership team Leicester Tigers. He made his debut at Welford Road against Wasps on 1 November scoring a try as Leicester won 24–16. Veainu quickly became a fan favourite and signed a contract extension on 11 January 2016. He won both newcomer of the year and player of the year in his first season in Leicester.

Veainu was awarded try of the week in Week 16 for his try against Saracens. His form in 2017/18 saw Veainu named as the Rugby Players' Association Players' Player of the year. He left ahead of the 2020–21 season.

=== Stade Français ===
He joined Stade Français ahead of the 2020–21 season.

=== Sale Sharks ===
On 30 May 2023, Veainu returns to England to join Premiership rivals Sale Sharks for the 2023-24 season.

=== Doncaster Knights ===
On 9 September 2024, Veainu signs for Doncaster Knights in the second-tier RFU Championship season for the 2024-25 season.

== International career ==
Veainu played for the New Zealand U20 at the age of 18 and 19, but in 2015 he was selected for Tonga for the 2015 World Rugby Pacific Nations Cup. He made his debut in the opening match against Fiji, scoring a try.

Veainu was selected for Tonga's 31-man squad to attend the 2019 Rugby World Cup, by Head Coach, Toutai Kefu. Veainu was Tonga's top try-scorer of the tournament, scoring three tries in total, two against Argentina and one in a two-point deficit to France.
