= Toby Morland =

NZ rugby union player (born 1983)

- Born: 27 February 1983 (age 43) Oamaru, New Zealand
- Height: 1.75 m (5 ft 9 in)
- Weight: 85 kg (13 st 5 lb; 187 lb)
- School: Marlborough Boys' College
- Occupation: Personal trainer

Rugby union career
- Position: Halfback
Senior career
Years	Team	Apps	(Points)
2002-2008	Otago	36	(20)
2004-2008	Highlanders	23	(15)
2009	Chiefs	14	(10)
2009-2010	Munster	4	(5)
2010-2011	Auckland	19	(20)
2011	Blues	5	(0)
2012-2013	Krasny Yar	33	(55)
2015−2016	Manawatu	14	(10)
- Correct as of 1 June 2019

Toby Morland (born 27 February 1983) is a New Zealand rugby union player. His position of choice is halfback. Morland currently plays for Manawatu in the Mitre 10 Cup.

He made his Super rugby debut for the Highlanders in 2004 and played for them until 2008. He was selected because of his strong performance in the Air New Zealand Cup when he played for Otago.

== Personal life ==
Morland has been living in the Manawatu, working as a personal trainer at the business he and his partner, Kate, started in Palmerston North. He has been playing club rugby for Te Kawau. Morland has four children.

== Otago ==
Since his debut for Otago in 2002 against Marlborough, Toby Morland was a regular player for the province, at times having to battle with Chris Smylie for the starting position. Morland has played 36 matches for Otago, scoring 20 points.

== Highlanders ==
Morland first played for the Highlanders in 2004 against the Chiefs. Morland was a regular back up to Jimmy Cowan throughout his Super rugby career, having played 23 matches and scored 15 points.

== Chiefs ==
Morland was drafted into the Chiefs squad for the 2009 Super 14 season.

== Munster ==
On 11 June 2009, Morland signed a six-month contract with Munster, he joined on 1 July. He won 4 caps for Munster and scored 1 try before returning to New Zealand in November 2009.

== Manawatu ==
In 2015 Morland was called in as injury cover for Kayne Hammington who bruised his ribs at a training camp. He signed on a week-by-week contract until Hammington had recovered.

He re-signed for the Turbos to play in the 2016 season. He started the first two games.
