= Steve Alfeld =

New Zealand rugby union player (born 1986)

- Full name: Steven Kenneth Alfeld
- Born: 2 February 1986 (age 40)
- Height: 179 cm (5 ft 10 in)
- Weight: 89 kg (196 lb)

Rugby union career
- Position: Half-back
Provincial / State sides
Years	Team	Apps	(Points)
2008	Canterbury	8	(0)
2010–12	Tasman	32	(59)
2014–17	Canterbury	4	(5)
Super Rugby
Years	Team	Apps	(Points)
2008, 2011	Crusaders	2	(0)

Steven Kenneth Alfeld (born 2 February 1986) is a New Zealand former professional rugby union player.

== Rugby career ==
A half-back, Alfeld represented New Zealand at the 2005 Under 19 Rugby World Championship.

Alfeld was part of the Crusaders wider training group in 2008 when an injury to Andy Ellis saw him called into the full squad, before making his debut in round nine against the Lions in Christchurch.

Most of Alfeld's provincial rugby was played with Tasman.

In 2016/17, Alfeld had a stint in Spanish rugby, playing with Quesos.

== Personal life ==
Alfeld was the boxing opponent of 37-year old project manager Kain Parsons who died in hospital after being knocked out in a Christchurch charity bout in 2018.
