= Rob Foreman =

- Born: 27 May 1984 (age 42) Pahiatua, New Zealand
- Height: 1.79 m (5 ft 10 1/2 in)
- Weight: 103 kg (227 lb)
- School: Wairarapa College
- University: UCOL, Palmerston North
- Occupation: Farmer

Rugby union career
- Position: Hooker
Amateur team(s)
Years	Team	Apps	(Points)
- High School Old Boys
2008–15	Varsity		
Provincial / State sides
Years	Team	Apps	(Points)
2004–05	Wairarapa Bush	20	
2006–15	Manawatu	110	(40)
- Correct as of 12 October 2015
- Correct as of 1 May 2013

Rob Foreman (born 27 May 1984) is a former New Zealand rugby union player. He notably played in the hooker position for Manawatu provincially. Foreman has also played for the New Zealand Universities team.

Playing for the Varsity club in Palmerston North, Foreman played 110 matches for the Manawatu province.

In 2012 he signed with the Hurricanes Super Rugby franchise as injury cover, this included him travelling to South Africa. Although he was told he would be used as a substitute, he was replaced and never took the field.

Foreman played his 100th game for Manawatu in the 2014 NPC Championship final against Hawkes Bay.

His last game was against Wellington in the 39–33 win in 2015, where he came on as a replacement.

== Personal ==
Foreman owns a farm in Makuri. He and his partner have three children together.
