= Willie Ripia =

- Full name: William Keho Ngametoa Ripia
- Born: 20 August 1985 (age 41) Murupara, New Zealand
- Height: 177 cm (5 ft 10 in)
- Weight: 91 kg (201 lb; 14 st 5 lb)
- School: Rotorua Boys' High School

Rugby union career
- Position: First five-eighth
Senior career
Years	Team	Apps	(Points)
2005–2007	Waikato	27	(79)
2006	Highlanders	1	(0)
2008–2010	Hurricanes	29	(152)
2008–2010	Taranaki	34	(317)
2011	Force	7	(15)
2013	Bay of Plenty	10	(119)
2014	Wellington	5	(52)
- Correct as of 26 May 2020
International career
Years	Team	Apps	(Points)
2005–2006	New Zealand U21	8	(50)
2010–2012	New Zealand Māori	5	(52)
- Correct as of 26 May 2020

Willie Ripia (born 20 August 1985) is a rugby union player. He plays as a first five-eighth. He was born in Murupara, New Zealand. Ripia attended Rotorua Boys' High School.

Ripia started his Super 14 career at the Highlanders before moving to the Hurricanes. He also played for Taranaki in the NPC. Ripia has played for New Zealand at U-19 and U-21 levels, and also for New Zealand Maori. In August 2010 he declared his intention to play for the Wallabies when he qualified on residency. He signed a two-year contract at the Western Force, but resigned in January 2012 following a serious breach of protocol. Ripia currently plays as a first five-eighth for the Bay of Plenty Steamers in the ITM Cup.

== Domestic career ==
Ripia made his Waikato debut in 2005, but playing behind a logjam of backline talent, in particular Stephen Donald at flyhalf, and an injury setback early in his second year after he ruptured his Achilles tendon playing against Auckland early in 2006, demanding a lengthy rehabilitation period.

Ripia started his Super Rugby career with the Highlanders after he was called into the squad in 2006 as an injury replacement to Nick Evans, making one appearance off the bench against the Western Force.

Ripia moved to Taranaki at the end of the 2007 Air New Zealand Cup with the promise of more regular game time at Taranaki than was on offer at Waikato.

In 2008 Ripia came to the Hurricanes as a franchise player for Taranaki. Starting the season on the reserves, he broke into the Hurricanes starting fifteen against the Lions in round twelve, finishing the last four games of the season including the 2008 semi-final against the Crusaders wearing the No. 10 jersey.

He impressed again in 2009 with a series of reliable performances throughout the second half of the competition, also scoring 80 points and kicking at almost 75 per cent. Ripia surpassed 150 Super 14 points in his third season in the Hurricanes in 2010.

He then went on and signed a two-year contract at the Western Force, but resigned in January 2012. He was recruited by the Force in 2010 as a foreign development player, which meant he could eventually qualify for Australia. He missed much of last season with foot and calf injuries but played a solid role in the team's surge near the end of their 2011 campaign. He was subsequently released early from the Force for a misdemeanour, making a tentative return to top-class rugby for the 2012 Bay of Plenty Development XV.

Ripia signed for the Bay of Plenty Steamers for the ITM Cup 2013 season.

== Personal life ==
According to the Sydney Morning Herald and other news sources, it was alleged by Western Force officials that Ripia had stolen money from other players at the club's facilities. Ripia initially denied any involvement, but resigned after being shown CCTV footage of the changing rooms. It was subsequently reported that Ripia had returned to New Zealand and was seeking treatment for problem gambling.
