= Richard Buckman =

New Zealand rugby union player

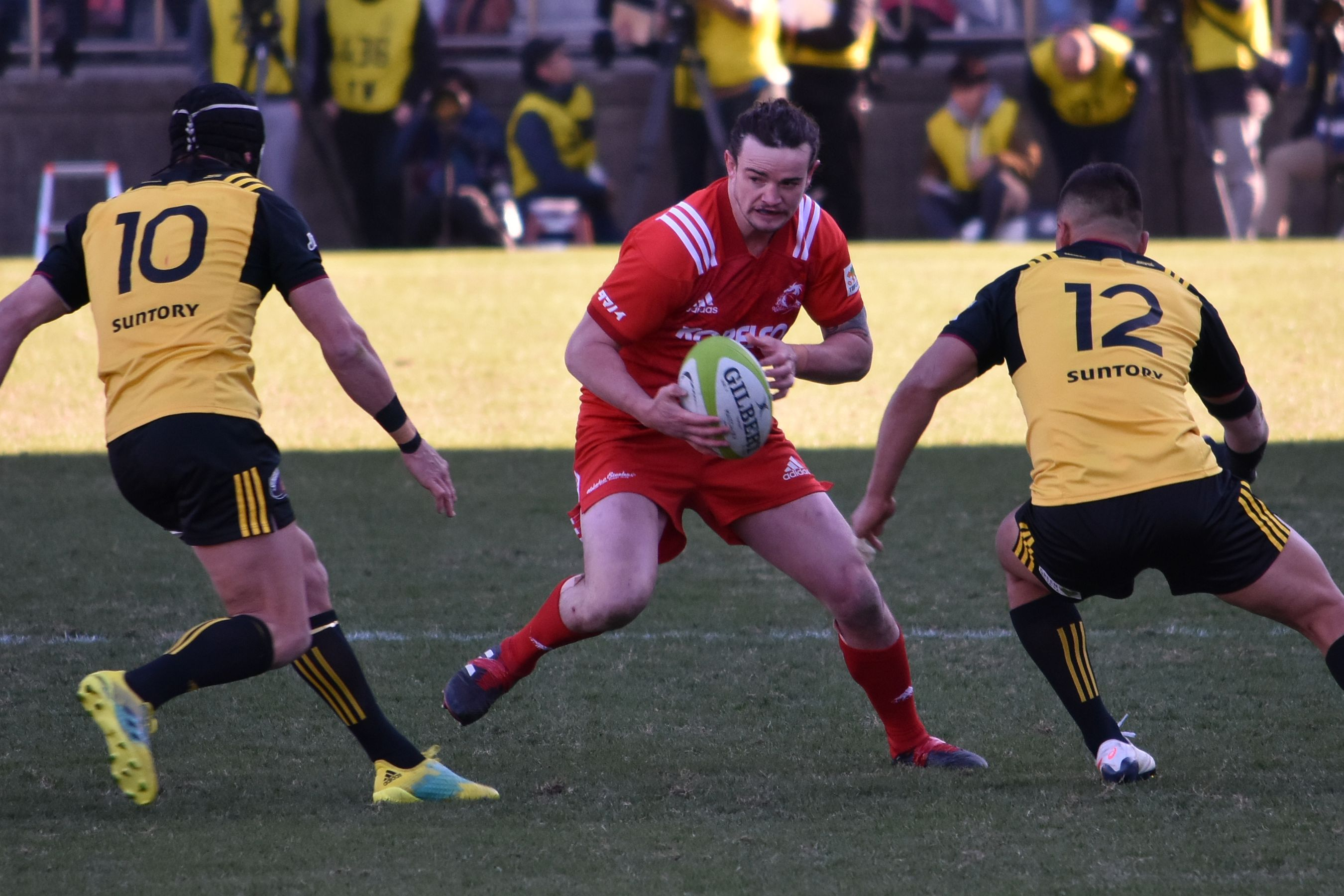
- Richard Buckman playing for Kobelco Steelers in 2018
- Full name: Richard James Buckman
- Born: 27 May 1989 (age 37) Palmerston North, New Zealand
- Height: 184 cm (6 ft 0 in)
- Weight: 94 kg (14 st 11 lb; 207 lb)
- School: Napier Boys' High School

Rugby union career
- Position(s): Centre, Wing, Fullback
Senior career
Years	Team	Apps	(Points)
2008–2017	Hawke's Bay	73	(121)
2011–2012	Hurricanes	3	(0)
2014–2019	Highlanders	50	(55)
2016–2017	Panasonic Wild Knights	12	(30)
2018–2023	Kobelco Steelers	33	(70)
- Correct as of 19 May 2023
International career
Years	Team	Apps	(Points)
2016–2017	Barbarian F.C.	2	(0)
- Correct as of 19 May 2023

Richard Buckman (born 27 May 1989) is a New Zealand rugby union player, who currently plays as a midfield back, wing or fullback for the Kobelco Kobe Steelers in the Japan Rugby League One competition.

== Early life ==
Buckman was born in Palmerston North, and went to Argyll School. In 2002, he was the Ross Shield player of the tournament. In 2004, he was selected for the Central Districts Under 15 Rugby League side and was a standout player. He attended Napier Boys' High School and was a member of their 1st XV.

== Rugby career ==
Buckman plays his club rugby for Napier Technical and was a member of the 2008 Hawke's Bay Magpies Wider Training Group. He made his debut off the bench for the Magpies against Otago at Carisbrook. In 2009, he was named in the squad and got his first start against Southland. In 2011, he made his debut off the bench for the [Hurricanes.

== 2009 season ==
Buckman came close to being selected for the New Zealand side for the Under-20 World Cup. He was named in the Blackbirds team and mainly used off the bench. He was selected for two starts, one against Southland at Rugby Park in Invercargill and the second in the semi-final against Canterbury at AMI Stadium in Christchurch.

== 2011 season ==
In January 2011, Buckman was selected for the Hurricanes Wider Training Group. He played in all but one of the Hurricanes Development Team games and was then called up to train with the full squad at the end of April. On 4 June 2011, he make his debut off the bench as replacement for winger Hosea Gear at the end of the match against the Lions at Westpac Stadium in Wellington.
