= Tim Dow =

- Full name: Timothy Dow
- Born: 9 September 1980 (age 46)
- Height: 178 cm (5 ft 10 in)
- Weight: 103 kg (227 lb)

Rugby union career
- Position: Hooker
Provincial / State sides
Years	Team	Apps	(Points)
2001–11	Northland	81	(70)
Super Rugby
Years	Team	Apps	(Points)
2006	Blues	3	(0)

Timothy Dow (born 9 September 1980) is a New Zealand former professional rugby union player.

A Kaitaia College product, Dow was a hooker with considerable pace and try scoring abilities.

Dow played his provincial rugby for Northland, making 81 appearances, and spent the 2006 Super 14 season with the Blues, serving as an understudy to their captain Keven Mealamu. He featured in three Super 14 matches for the Blues, all off the bench. Between 2007 and 2009, Dow competed with Italian club Gran Parma.
