= Fa'atonu Fili =

Fa'atonu Pelasio Fili
- Born: 31 August 1981 (age 45) Wellington, New Zealand
- Height: 1.80 m (5 ft 11 in)
- Weight: 92 kg (203 lb)

Rugby union career
- Position: Flyhalf
Senior career
Years	Team	Apps	(Points)
2013-	Kandy Sports Club		
Provincial / State sides
Years	Team	Apps	(Points)
2014-	Wellington	1	(0)
- Correct as of 13 October 2014
International career
Years	Team	Apps	(Points)
2002-	Samoa	3	(8)

Fa'atonu Fili (born 31 August 1981) is a Samoan rugby union footballer. He plays as a fly-half.

Fili played his first the Samoa national rugby sevens team in 2001, and later played at the 2002 and 2006 Commonwealth games. He later played for the Samoa national rugby union team at the 2003 Rugby World Cup. After years of obscurity he played rugby for Wellington Lions in the Air New Zealand Cup in 2009, becoming 1st choice fly half and earning a recall for Samoa. He continued this late revival in his career, again playing for Wellington in 2010 and 2014. Fili was also named in the 1999 RWC squad although he did not play any games.

Fili joined the Kandy Sports Club in the Sri Lankan Domestic Rugby Season 2013-2014.

In 2017 he played his 200th game for Marist St Pats.

In 2019 a Wellington rugby sevens tournament was named after him.
