= James Kamana =

- Born: James Kamana; 15 August 1985 (age 41) Hamilton, New Zealand
- Height: 1.85 m (6 ft 1 in)
- Weight: 87 kg (13 st 10 lb)

Rugby union career
- Position: Full-Back / Wing
Provincial / State sides
Years	Team	Apps	(Points)
2007–2009	Waikato	6	(25)
2009–2010	Tasman	18	(30)
2011–2012	Golden Lions	11	(0)
2013–present	Kamaishi Seawaves		
- Correct as of 26 May 2013
Super Rugby
Years	Team	Apps	(Points)
2011–2012	Lions	17	(0)
- Correct as of 16 July 2012

James Kamana (born 15 August 1985) is a New Zealand rugby union footballer. He plays mostly as a full-back or a winger. He represents the Lions in Super Rugby and the Golden Lions in the Currie Cup and Vodacom Cup. He previously played for Waikato and Tasman in his native country.

He joined Japanese second tier side Kamaishi Seawaves in 2013.
