= Colin Bourke =

Japanese rugby sevens player

- Born: 15 October 1984 (age 42) Napier, New Zealand

Rugby union career
- Position(s): Flanker, Number 8, Fly-half, Centre
Amateur team(s)
Years	Team	Apps	(Points)
2004-2011	Bay of Plenty	90	(115)
2003	Hawke's Bay	12	(97)
Senior career
Years	Team	Apps	(Points)
2005	Highlanders	2	(15)
2009–2010	Chiefs	15	(0)
2011–2021	Ricoh Black Rams	90	(136)
2022–2024	NTT DoCoMo Red Hurricanes	16	(45)
International career
Years	Team	Apps	(Points)
2010	Māori All Blacks	3	
National sevens teams
Years	Team		Comps
2021	Japan 7s		2
2004	New Zealand 7s		3

Colin Bourke (born 15 October 1984) is a former Japanese rugby union and sevens player. He competed for Japan at the 2020 Summer Olympics.

== Early life and career ==
Bourke was born in Napier, New Zealand, he attended St Patrick's School and then Napier Boys' High School. He participated in athletics, cricket and rugby throughout intermediate and up till sixth form at Napier Boys' High School. He played club rugby for Taradale.

He represented the New Zealand Schools in 2002 and played against the Fiji and Australian schools.

== Rugby career ==
In 2003, he made the New Zealand sevens team and they went on to win the 2004–05 World Sevens Series. He then moved to Mount Maunganui to play for Bay of Plenty for eight seasons. He also played Super Rugby for the Highlanders, and Chiefs.

In 2010, he played three games for the New Zealand Māori against the New Zealand Barbarians, Ireland and England. He also played for the Barbarians that same year and suffered a serious shoulder injury which saw him miss the entire 2011 Super Rugby season.

Bourke moved to Japan in 2012 to play with the Ricoh Black Rams and was naturalized as a citizen in 2018. He competed for Japan in the men's sevens tournament at the 2020 Summer Olympics.

In 2024, he announced his retirement from rugby after two seasons with Red Hurricanes Osaka in League One’s second division.
