= Frontier justice =

Extrajudicial punishment

Frontier justice is extrajudicial punishment that is motivated by the nonexistence of law and order or dissatisfaction with judicial punishment. The phrase can also be used to describe a prejudiced judge. Lynching, vigilantism and gunfighting are considered forms of frontier justice.

== Examples ==
=== United States ===
- March 20 to April 15, 1882: Wyatt Earp and Doc Holliday tracked and killed 4 cowboys said to be responsible for Morgan Earp's death, which would later become known as the Earp Vendetta Ride.
- 1889: Ellen Watson was lynched in Wyoming as a cattle rustler.
- Late 1800s: A group of self-appointed lawmen called "stranglers" lynched around sixty horse rustlers and cattle rustlers along southwest North Dakota's Little Missouri River.

=== Brazil ===
- April 1991: José Vicente Anunciação murdered a co-worker during a drunken knife-fight in Salvador, Bahia. Witnesses to the crime were not able to provide evidence in court. Anunciação was set free and then dragged from his bed at night by a mob of forty people who beat him to death with bricks and clubs. Previously, a mob of 1,500 people stormed and set fire to the Paraná prison where Valdecir Ferreira and Altair Gomes were being held for the murder of a taxi-cab driver.

== See also ==
- Citizen's arrest
- Divine retribution
- Gjakmarrja
- Hanging of Patrick O'Connor
- Jungle justice
- Jungle law
- Noble cause corruption
- Ochlocracy
- Range war
- Rough music
- Victim blaming
- Victimization
- Witch-hunt
