= Dallas Seymour =

- Born: 19 August 1967 (age 59) Tokoroa, New Zealand
- Height: 183 cm (6 ft 0 in)
- Weight: 94 kg (14 st 11 lb; 207 lb)

Rugby union career
- Position: Loose forward
International career
Years	Team	Apps	(Points)
1992	New Zealand	3	
National sevens team
Years	Team		Comps
1988–2002	New Zealand		
Medal record
Men's rugby sevens
Representing New Zealand
Commonwealth Games
Gold medal – first place	1998 Kuala Lumpur	Team competition

Dallas Seymour (born 19 August 1967 in Tokoroa) is a former New Zealand rugby union footballer and rugby sevens player. One of New Zealand rugby sevens' longest serving players, he played in the national team from 1988 until 2002.

He also had a distinguished provincial rugby career at the fifteen a side game and made a brief appearance as an All Black playing 3 tour matches in 1992, one in Australia and two in South Africa.

He is married to former Silver Fern captain julie Seymour (née Dawson). When he won a gold medal at the Rugby sevens at the 1998 Commonwealth Games she won a silver medal in the Netball competition.
