= Lachie Munro =

- Born: Lachlan Hamish Munro; 27 November 1986 (age 39) Auckland, New Zealand
- Height: 1.8 m (5 ft 11 in)
- Weight: 92 kg (203 lb)
- School: Auckland Grammar
- University: University of Auckland

Rugby union career
- Position: Utility Back
- Current team: Provence
Senior career
Years	Team	Apps	(Points)
2012–2013	Bordeaux	10	(51)
2013–2015	Lyon	44	(324)
2015–2018	Béziers	79	(696)
2018–	Provence	3	(0)
- Correct as of 31 August 2018
Provincial / State sides
Years	Team	Apps	(Points)
2006–2008	Auckland	17	(90)
2009–2012	Northland	36	(430)
Super Rugby
Years	Team	Apps	(Points)
2009–2012	Blues	27	(137)
- Correct as of 25 July 2012

Lachlan Hamish Munro (born 27 November 1986) is a former New Zealand professional rugby union player. Munro is a versatile player and he is capable of covering every position in the backline.

Munro attended Auckland Grammar School. In 2007 Munro played for the New Zealand 7s side and also the New Zealand under 21s side. He also played for Auckland in the National Provincial Championship. 2008, Munro moved north and notably played for the Northland union.

Munro was the leading points scorer for the 2010 ITM Cup with 172 points from 6 tries, 32 conversions and 26 penalties in 13 matches. Munro appeared for the Blues in the 2009 and 2010 Super 14, travelling directly to many games despite not being selected in the initial Blues squads. Munro debuted against the Sharks in 2009. Munro was selected for the Blues full squad for the first time for 2011, and remained a squad member in 2012.

He then left New Zealand to join French Top 14 team CA Bordeaux-Bègles Gironde for the 2012–13 season where he played a few games. He decided to move to Pro D2 team LOU Rugby for the 2013–2014 season, where he was the team's main goal kicker.

For the 2015–2016 season, Munro joined French Rugby Pro D2 team Béziers. He joined Provence Rugby in 2018.

On 9 July 2023 he announced his retirement from rugby on his Facebook page.
