= Glen Horton =

- Born: 12 April 1983 (age 43) Taihape, New Zealand
- Height: 1.8 m (5 ft 11 in)
- Weight: 88 kg (194 lb)

Rugby union career
- Position: Fullback
Senior career
Years	Team	Apps	(Points)
2012–14	Krasny Yar	30	(35)
Provincial / State sides
Years	Team	Apps	(Points)
2008	Otago	32	(15)
2009–11	Southland	28	(30)
Super Rugby
Years	Team	Apps	(Points)
2003–05, 2007–08	Highlanders	21	(15)

Glen Horton (born 12 April 1983) is a retired New Zealand rugby union player (fullback), formerly playing for the Super Rugby team Highlanders. Horton made his Super 14 debut in 2004, only 21 years old.
