= Dean Budd =

New Zealand-born Italian rugby union player (born 1986)

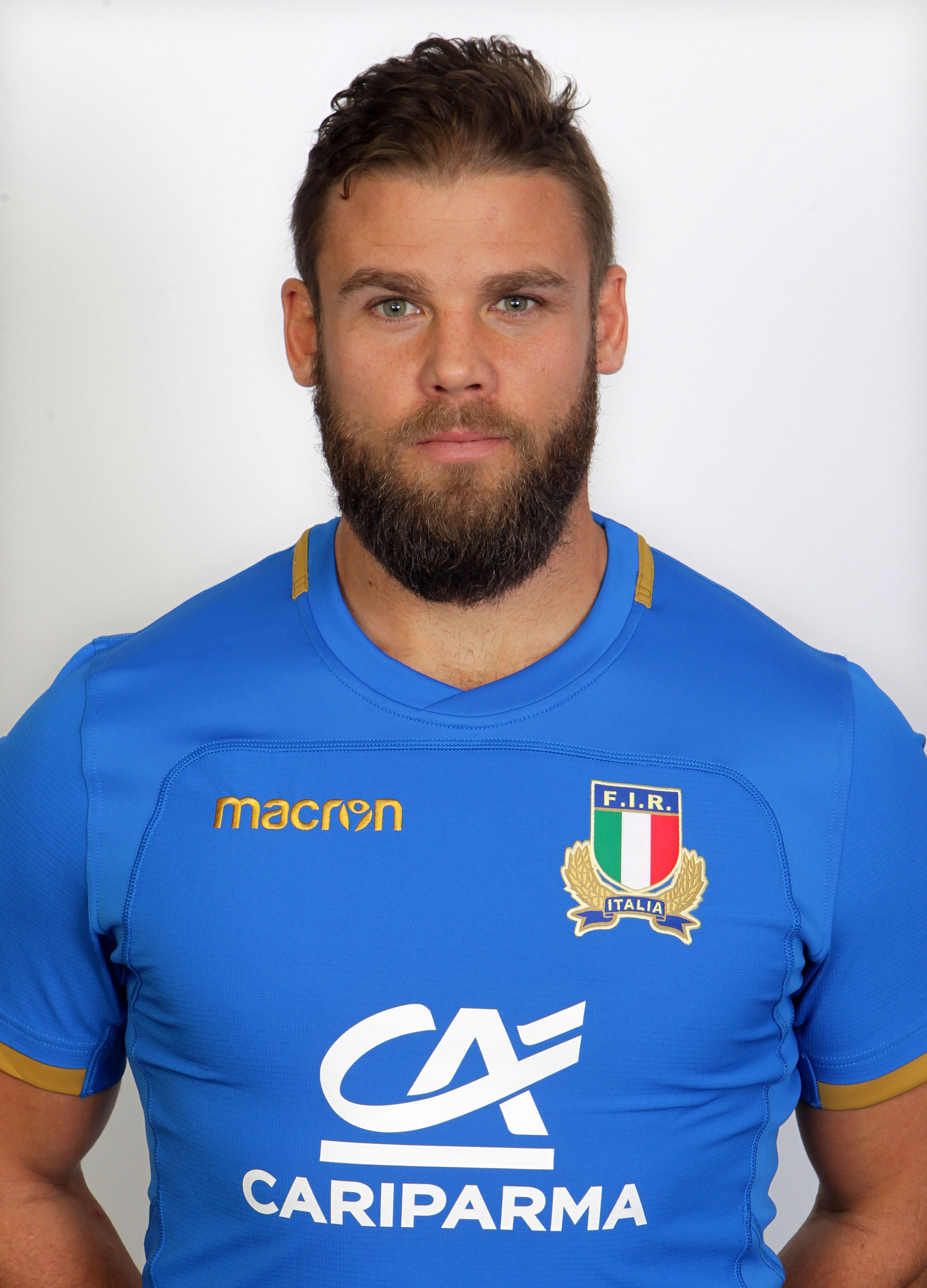
- Budd in 2017
- Born: 31 July 1986 (age 40) Whangārei, New Zealand
- Height: 1.95 m (6 ft 5 in)
- Weight: 108 kg (17 st 0 lb; 238 lb)

Rugby union career
- Position: Lock
- Current team: Benetton
Senior career
| Years | Team | Apps | (Points) |
| 2008–2010 | Auckland | 15 | (20) |
| 2009 | Blues | 5 | (5) |
| 2011 | Northland | 13 | (35) |
| 2011–2012 | NEC Green Rockets | 2 | (0) |
| 2012–2020 | Benetton | 115 | (70) |
- Correct as of 15 Nov 2019
International career
| Years | Team | Apps | (Points) |
| 2017–2020 | Italy | 29 | (10) |
- Correct as of 22 Feb 2020

Dean Budd (born 31 July 1986) is a retired New Zealand-born, Italian rugby union player and his usual position was at Lock.

Budd played in the NPC with Northland and Auckland Rugby, while also playing with the Auckland Blues in the Super Rugby. Also able to play second row, Budd is a good jumper and is famous for his fancy offloads. Before joining Benetton Budd played for the NEC Green Rockets in the Top League.

Budd arrived in Italy and to Benetton in the 2012–13 Pro12 season. He gained eligibility to play for Italy by way of residency in 2015.Budd debuted for Italy in the summer of June 2017 against Scotland in Singapore.

In April 2017, Budd signed a contract renewal with Treviso for the 2017–18 Pro14 season and beyond and Treviso Head Coach Kieran Crowley named Budd as captain for the 2017–18 season. He is currently living with his pet dog Due. He played with Benetton until 2019–20 Pro14 season.

On 18 August 2019, he was named in the final 31-man squad for the 2019 Rugby World Cup. He represented italy on 29 occasions and captained the side on 3 occasions.
