= Tyson Keats =

- Full name: Tyson Paul Keats
- Born: 6 June 1981 (age 45) Christchurch, New Zealand
- Height: 173 cm (5 ft 8 in)
- Weight: 83 kg (183 lb; 13 st 1 lb)
- School: Shirley Boys' High School

Rugby union career
- Position: Half-back
Senior career
Years	Team	Apps	(Points)
2003	Nelson Bays	10	(30)
2006–2009	Canterbury	31	(25)
2009	Crusaders	3	(0)
2010–2011	Hurricanes	21	(20)
2010–2011	Taranaki	21	(15)
2011–2012	Aironi	20	(0)
2012–2014	London Welsh	20	(5)
- Correct as of 23 May 2020

Tyson Keats (born 6 June 1981) is a New Zealand rugby union player who last played for London Welsh in the English Premiership. His position of choice is halfback.

Keats is currently playing club rugby for the New Brighton club in Christchurch, New Zealand.

He previously played for Italian club Aironi, Nelson Bays, Taranaki and Canterbury in the ITM Cup. Keats also played in the Super Rugby competition representing the Hurricanes and the Crusaders respectively.

== Controversy ==
In 2013 Keats was part of a frustrating problem involving his passport which resulted in London Welsh being relegated. Keats described it as "the toughest time of his career".

In March 2013 the club were found guilty of playing Keats for 10 games illegally while he held a fake English passport. Thus, five league points were removed which killed their chances of survival in the Premiership. The club was also fined over $30,000 NZD.

Former manager Mike Scott was found fully responsible and was banned from any participation in rugby for life.

Upon signing for the club from Aironi, Keats' agent asked Scott if Keats should return to New Zealand to sort out his visa but Scott assured it would be taken care of in England. Keats found out he was Ineligible to play on the season opening match. The next week Keats was then told he was "fine" and it was all sorted. Further investigation by the new manager discovered that Scott had incorrectly stated Keats was from Christchurch, Dorset as opposed to Christchurch in New Zealand. This was all amongst a rush to field Keats as soon as possible.

== Personal ==
While playing for Canterbury Keats owned an exterior plastering and painting business but when he made the move to the Hurricanes he was forced to sell it.
