= Steve Fualau =

Samoan rugby union player

- Full name: Steve Fualau
- Born: 3 August 1984 (age 42) Samoa
- Height: 1.89 m (6 ft 2 in)
- Weight: 115 kg (18 st 2 lb; 254 lb)

Rugby union career
- Position: Hooker
- Current team: Rebels
Amateur team(s)
Years	Team	Apps	(Points)
2013	Southern Districts	17	(10)
Senior career
Years	Team	Apps	(Points)
2007–11	Canterbury	27	(20)
2012	Auckland	0	(0)
2014	Rebels	3	(0)
2014-	Béziers	53	(15)
- Correct as of 4 June 2014

Steve Fualau (born 3 August 1984) is a Samoan rugby union player who currently plays as a hooker for the Melbourne Rebels in Super Rugby.

== Career ==
Fualau has had something of a journeyman career, starting out in New Zealand's South Island with Canterbury where he earned 27 caps over the course of 4 years and was also part of the Crusaders wider training group in 2008. He shifted north to join Auckland ahead of the 2012 ITM Cup, however his stay was not a happy one and he left without making any senior appearances. A shift across the Tasman followed in 2013 and he played Club Rugby for Southern Districts in the New South Wales Shute Shield.

Fualau was not initially named in either the Rebels regular squad or extended playing squad for the 2014 Super Rugby season. He was however brought in to little fanfare as an experienced hand to help out the Melbourne franchise's other hookers, Pat Leafa, Shota Horie and Tom Sexton who between them boasted only 7 super rugby caps prior to the start of the season. Fualau made his super rugby debut at the age of 29 as a substitute in the Rebels opening game of the season against the Cheetahs on 28 February 2014. He replaced Pat Leafa in the 74th minute as his side recorded a 35-14 victory.

== International ==
Fualau was a member of the Manu Samoa side which won the 2012 IRB Pacific Nations Cup.
