= Tajhon Mailata =

NZ rugby union player (born 1986)

- Born: Tajhon Smallman Mailata; 21 January 1986 (age 40) Auckland, New Zealand
- Height: 1.84 m (6 ft 0 in)
- School: Nudgee College

Rugby union career
- Position: Fullback
- Current team: Bay of Plenty
Senior career
| Years | Team | Apps | (Points) |
| 2007– | Bay of Plenty | | |
| 2006 | Western Force | | |

Tajhon Smallman Mailata (born 21 January 1986 in Auckland, New Zealand) currently plays rugby union for the Wellington Lions having transferred from the Bay of Plenty Steamers just prior to the 2010 season. Before relocating to New Zealand he played for Australian team Western Force.

He stands at 184 cm and weighs 94 kg, and his favoured position is fullback. He has been referred to as a "dazzling runner with ball in hand".

Moving to Australia with his family in 1996, Tajhon attended Brisbane's Nudgee College, winning an undefeated premiership with the school team in 2002 and graduating in 2003. While at Nudgee, Tajhon played fullback for the Australian schoolboys team, named as a reserve.

Tajhon is of mixed Māori, Samoan and European heritage. His iwi are Ngāti Tuwharetoa, Ngaiterangi and Ngapuhi.
