= Garratt Williamson =

- Born: 27 April 1971 (age 55)

Rugby union career
Refereeing career
Years	Competition	Apps
2005	National Provincial Championship	4
2006–2014	Heartland Championship	15
2007–2014	ITM Cup	47
2009–2014	Super Rugby	27
2010	IRB Junior World Championship	4
- Correct as of 28 June 2013

Garratt Williamson (born 27 April 1971) is a retired New Zealand rugby union referee. He started officiating at international level in 2010 and at domestic level in 2005.

== Career ==
Williamson started refereeing college games when he was 15, in 1986, before concentrating on playing the next year. After several seasons with the Paraparaumu senior side, Williamson went back to refereeing in 1997.

Williamson started his international career in 2010 refereeing Japan v Samoa in Tokyo. From 2011 onwards he was mainly an assistant referee, featuring in the 2012 June test series with Australia and Wales.
