= Savenaca Tokula =

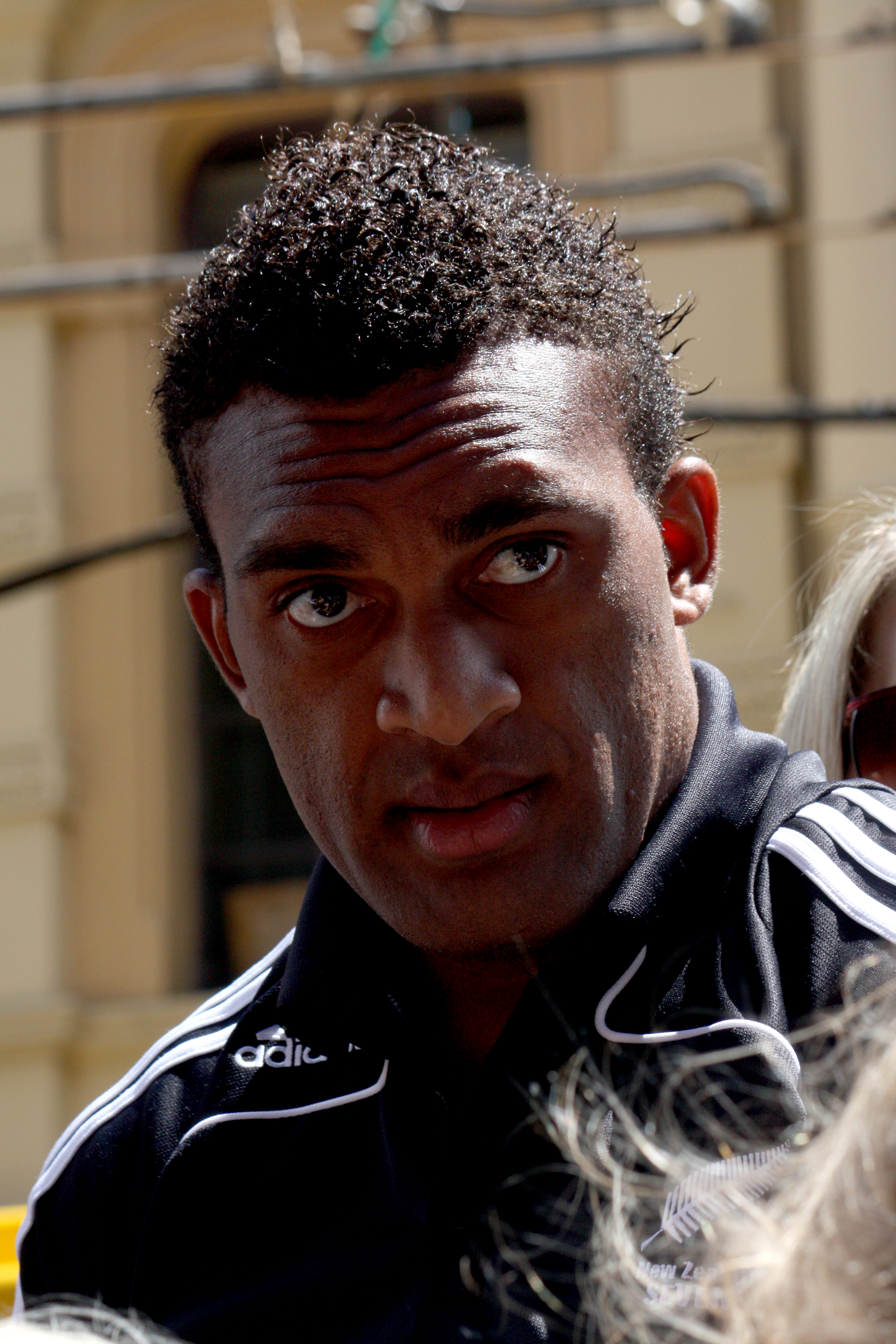
- Born: Savenaca Tokula; 15 June 1985 (age 41) Fiji
- Height: 1.87 m (6 ft 1 1/2 in)
- Weight: 96 kg (15 st 2 lb)
- School: Hamilton Boys' High School

Rugby union career
- Position(s): Centre, Wing
Senior career
Years	Team	Apps	(Points)
2008–13	Waikato	57	(60)
2012 (loan)	Munster	2	(0)
2013–2015	Aurillac	38	(45)
2015-2017	Mont-de-Marsan	24	(25)
- Correct as of 21 October 2013
Super Rugby
Years	Team	Apps	(Points)
2010–11	Chiefs	6	(5)
- Correct as of 26 May 2013
National sevens team
Years	Team		Comps
2009–10	New Zealand Sevens		

Savenaca Tokula (born 15 June 1985 in Fiji) is a Fijian-born New Zealand rugby union player. He plays as either a centre or wing.

== Waikato ==
Tokula made his debut for Waikato against Wellington in September 2008.

== Munster ==
It was announced on 15 February 2012 that Tokula would be joining Munster for the remainder of the 2011–12 season, to provide support in the backs following injuries. He arrived in Ireland on 19 February 2012. His first training session with the Munster squad was on 21 February 2012. Tokula made his debut for Munster against Newport Gwent Dragons during a Pro12 league fixture on 3 March 2012. Tokula returned to New Zealand at the end of the 2011–12 Pro 12 season.
