= Tu Umaga-Marshall =

NZ rugby union player

- Full name: Tumatauenga Palatiso Umaga-Marshall
- Born: 3 March 1983 (age 43)
- Height: 190 cm (6 ft 3 in)
- Weight: 101 kg (223 lb)
- School: Hutt Valley High School
- Notable relative(s): Tana Umaga (uncle); Benji Marshall (cousin); Jeremy Marshall-King (cousin)

Rugby union career
- Position: Wing / Centre
Senior career
| Years | Team | Apps | (Points) |
| 2012–14 | Coca-Cola Red Sparks | | |
Provincial / State sides
| Years | Team | Apps | (Points) |
| 2008 | Wellington | 10 | (10) |
| 2009–10 | Canterbury | 21 | (25) |
| 2011 | Hawke's Bay | 9 | (5) |
| 2014–15 | Wellington | 7 | (5) |
Super Rugby
| Years | Team | Apps | (Points) |
| 2010–11 | Crusaders | 2 | (0) |

Tumatauenga Palatiso Umaga-Marshall (born 3 March 1983) is a New Zealand former professional rugby union player and semi-professional basketball player.

Raised in Wainuiomata, Lower Hutt, Umaga-Marshall is a nephew of All Black Tana Umaga and cousin of rugby league player Benji Marshall. He is of Māori and Samoan heritage and attended Hutt Valley High School.

Umaga-Marshall played limited rugby union growing up, with basketball being his focus. He played basketball as a point guard for the Waikato Titans and Nelson Giants in the National Basketball League (NBL).

Primarily a winger, Umaga-Marshall transitioned to rugby union via sevens and made his international debut for New Zealand at the 2006 Hong Kong Sevens. He began playing provincial rugby for Wellington in 2008, the season the province ended a 26-year Ranfurly Shield title drought. After crossing to Canterbury in 2009, Umaga-Marshall was occasionally called up by the Crusaders, making two Super 14 appearances.

Umaga-Marshall turned down a contract offer to return to the NBL with the Wellington Saints in 2012, instead playing two seasons of Japanese professional rugby at Coca-Cola Red Sparks.
