= Pat O'Connor (rugby union) =

Australian rugby union player

Pat O’Connor
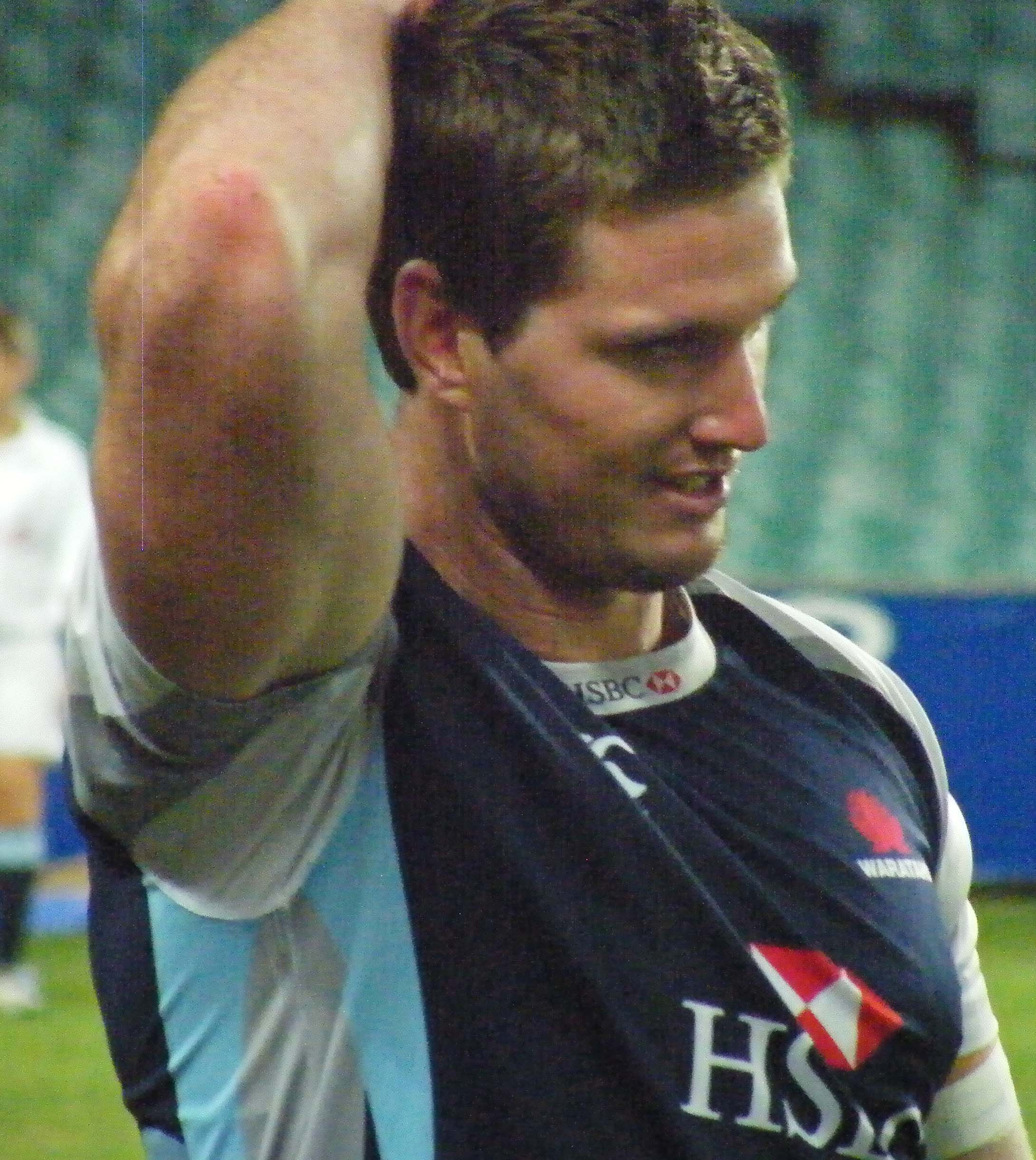
- Born: Patrick O'Connor; 7 January 1985 (age 41) Brisbane, Australia
- Height: 1.97 m (6 ft 6 in)
- Weight: 114 kg (17 st 13 lb)
- School: Marist College Ashgrove

Rugby union career
- Position: Lock
Amateur team(s)
Years	Team	Apps	(Points)
2003–05	GPS Rugby		
Senior career
Years	Team	Apps	(Points)
2009–10	Northland	13	(0)
2011–12	SU Agen	19	(5)
- Correct as of 13 February 2014
Super Rugby
Years	Team	Apps	(Points)
2006–09	Western Force	8	(0)
2011	Waratahs	6	(0)
International career
Years	Team	Apps	(Points)
2006	Australia U-21		

Pat O’Connor (born 7 January 1985) is an Australian rugby union footballer. He has played for the Western Force and the Waratahs in Super Rugby, and for SU Agen in the Top 14. The position he usually plays is lock.

== Early life ==
O'Connor was born in Brisbane, Australia. He attended secondary school at Marist College Ashgrove in Brisbane, where he played rugby for the 1st XV. During his final year at Ashgrove in 2002, he was selected to represent Queensland at the Australian Schools Rugby Championships.

== Rugby career ==
In 2003, O’Connor was invited to join the Reds Rugby College from the GPS club in Brisbane. He played for the Queensland U19 side in the Trans Tasman Challenge competition in 2003 and 2004. In 2005, he signed with the Western Force to be a start-up player for their first season in 2006.

O'Connor made his Super Rugby debut for the Force against the Waratahs on 17 March 2006. Later that year he was selected for the Australian U21 team and the Prime Minister's XV.

At the start of 2007, O'Connor tore a cruciate ligament in the final training run before a trial match against the Crusaders. Five months after the resulting knee surgery, he re-tore the ligament leading to a second reconstruction. As a result, did not play Super Rugby for the Western Force again until 2009.

In the latter part of 2009, O'Connor joined the Northland province in New Zealand, where he played in the ITM Cup for the 2009 and 2010 seasons.

In October 2010, O'Connor signed with the Waratahs. That month, he was selected in the Wallabies training squad for the 2010 Spring Tour. O'Connor was capped 6 times playing for the Waratahs in the 2011 Super Rugby season. He then signed with SU Agen for the 2011–12 Top 14 season in France, where he won 6 caps.
