= Nigel Hunt =

- Born: Nigel Hunt; 14 May 1983 (age 43) Apia, Samoa
- Height: 1.75 m (5 ft 9 in)
- Weight: 89 kg (14 st 0 lb; 196 lb)

Rugby union career
- Position: Halfback
Senior career
Years	Team	Apps	(Points)
2010-	Grenoble	54	(75)
Provincial / State sides
Years	Team	Apps	(Points)
2004–2006	Wellington	6	(0)
2008–2009	Bay of Plenty	24	(20)
National sevens team
Years	Team		Comps
2005–2007	New Zealand 7s		
Medal record
Men's rugby sevens
Representing New Zealand
Commonwealth Games
Gold medal – first place	2006 Melbourne	Team competition

Nigel Hunt (born 14 May 1983 in Apia, Samoa) is a New Zealand rugby union player who most famously played for the New Zealand Sevens team. He achieved a Gold Medal along with his NZ Sevens teammates at the 2006 Commonwealth games in Melbourne. Hunt was a member of both NZ Sevens squads that won the Sevens World Circuits in 2006 and 2007.

He currently plays for French Top 14 Rugby Union club Grenoble, having previously turned out for New Zealand National Provincial Championship side Bay of Plenty and Wellington.

== Teams ==
- Grenoble (France) 2010 – present
- Bay of Plenty 2008–2009
- NZ Sevens 2005–2007
- Wellington 2004–2006
- Wellington Under 21 2002
- Wellington Rugbyleague bartercard cup 2003
- Tawa R.F.C. 2002–2004
- Porirua R.F.C. 2000–2001
