= Edwin Cocker =

- Born: Edwin Cocker; 3 November 1980 (age 46) Auckland, New Zealand
- Height: 1.92 m (6 ft 4 in)
- Weight: 100 kg (16 st; 220 lb)

Rugby union career
- Position(s): Loose forward, Centres
Senior career
Years	Team	Apps	(Points)
2002	Marlborough		
2006	Otago		
International career
Years	Team	Apps	(Points)
2005–present	New Zealand Sevens		

Edwin Cocker (born 3 November 1980) is a New Zealand rugby union player who plays for the New Zealand Sevens team. He has a twin brother Sione, who plays Sevens for Tonga. His father Kepelielie was a rugby union player for Tonga. Edwin was an alumnus of St Paul's College, Auckland.
