= Hanging of Patrick O'Connor =

Execution carried out after the first murder trial in Iowa

The hanging of Patrick O'Connor happened on June 20, 1834, in Dubuque, Michigan Territory, to a man convicted in Iowa's first murder trial. He was an immigrant from Ireland to the United States. The hanging occurred after his attempted lynching on May 19, 1834. The case and others like it showed a need for formal laws in the territory.

== Murder of George O'Keaf ==
O'Connor was born in Ireland in 1797 and immigrated to Galena, Illinois, in 1826. Two years later, he broke his leg, requiring amputation. This helped make him a quarrelsome trouble maker. He shot a merchant, who survived. Some men considered lynching him, then decided otherwise when he promised them he would leave Galena.

After leaving Galena, O'Connor traveled to Dubuque, Michigan Territory, to work in the lead mines. In 1833, he met fellow Irishman George O'Keaf. They built a cabin two miles south of Dubuque. On May 19, 1834, O'Keaf traveled to Dubuque to gather supplies and returned with one of his friends near 2 pm. After O'Connor refused to unlock the door, O'Keaf broke it down with his shoulder. O'Connor was sitting in a bench on the opposite side and fatally shot him once with a musket. O'Keaf's friend reported this to the nearest cabin. When multiple miners asked O'Connor why he did it, he responded: "That is my business". He ordered them to bury the body. Some considered hanging O'Connor, and others wanted a trial. He was thus taken to Dubuque.

== Trial ==
The trial was held on May 20, 1834, making it the first murder trial in Iowa. O'Connor was given the right to select the jury and it took place outside, under an elm tree. The jury, seated on a log, listened to the testimonies of witnesses. After the arguments from the defense and prosecution, the jury found O'Connor was guilty of first degree murder. He was sentenced to be hanged on June 20, 1834.

During the month after the trial, O'Connor asked for a pardon or commutation of his sentence. The governor of Missouri said he did not have the power to grant a pardon and President Andrew Jackson said that "Congress had not extended the laws of the United States to that part of the country". At 1 pm on June 20, 1834, he was hanged.

== Aftermath ==
Because of this incident and others like it, Congress provided laws for the Iowa territory. On June 28, 1834, President Jackson approved an act which extended the "boundaries of Michigan to the Missouri and White Earth rivers and embracing all the territory between the northern boundary of Missouri and the Forty-Ninth Parallel". This ensured the beneficiaries of the Black Hawk Purchase would have the authority and protection of the United States.
