= Onosai Tololima-Auva'a =

Onosai Auva'a
- Born: Onosai Auva'a; 7 February 1985 (age 41) Auckland, New Zealand
- Height: 1.86 m (6 ft 1 in)
- Weight: 102 kg (225 lb)

Rugby union career
- Position(s): Flanker (7's: Fly Half, prop forward)
Amateur team(s)
Years	Team	Apps	(Points)
- Grammer Carlton
–	Ardmore Marist		
–	Papatoetoe Rugby		
Senior career
Years	Team	Apps	(Points)
2011–2012	Sale Sharks	7	(0)
- Correct as of 12 May 2012
Provincial / State sides
Years	Team	Apps	(Points)
2006–2011	Auckland	52	(60)
2014−	Counties Manukau	28	(20)
- Correct as of 23 October 2016
Super Rugby
Years	Team	Apps	(Points)
2006–2009	Blues	18	(10)
International career
Years	Team	Apps	(Points)
2004	New Zealand U19	5	(0)
2006	New Zealand U21	5	(0)
2016	NZ Marist	1	(0)
National sevens team
Years	Team		Comps
2006,2010	New Zealand		
Medal record
Men's rugby sevens
Representing New Zealand
Commonwealth Games
Gold medal – first place	2006 Melbourne	Team competition

Onosai Auva'a (born 7 February 1985 in Auckland) is a New Zealand rugby union footballer who has played for the Auckland Blues Super Rugby team and also for Auckland in the ITM Cup. Auva'a has signed for Sale Sharks on a two-month loan contract lasting until February 2012, but an outstanding performance against Leicester Tigers in the Aviva Premiership would appear to further Auva'a's aim of a long-term contract with the Sharks.

== Career ==
At the 2006 Commonwealth Games he was part of the New Zealand Sevens team that won a gold medal.

=== Career history ===
- 2011: Auckland Provincial team (ITM Cup)
- 2010: Auckland Provincial team
- 2009: New Zealand 7s, Auckland Blues, Auckland Provincial team
- 2008: Auckland Blues, Auckland Provincial team
- 2007: Auckland Blues, Auckland Provincial team
- 2006: New Zealand 7s, Auckland Blues, Auckland Provincial team, Auckland 7s, New Zealand Under-21
- 2005: Auckland Blues Development, Auckland Rugby Academy, Auckland Under-20s (captain)
- 2004: New Zealand Under-19, Auckland Under-19's (captain)
- 2001: New Zealand Under-16, Auckland Under-16's (captain)
