= Ben Souness =

- Full name: Benjamin John Souness
- Born: 8 March 1985 (age 41) New Plymouth, New Zealand
- Height: 188 cm (6 ft 2 in)
- Weight: 102 kg (225 lb)
- School: New Plymouth Boys' High School

Rugby union career
- Position: Flanker / No. 8
Provincial / State sides
Years	Team	Apps	(Points)
2009–11	Taranaki	33	(10)
National sevens team
Years	Team		Comps
- New Zealand 7s
Medal record
Men's rugby sevens
Representing New Zealand
Commonwealth Games
Gold medal – first place	2010 Delhi	Team competition

Benjamin John Souness (born 3 May 1985) is a New Zealand former rugby union player.

Born in New Plymouth, Souness was educated at New Plymouth Boys' High School and played in their first XV.

Souness, an electrical engineer by profession, was a loose forward and played his club rugby for New Plymouth HSOB, while competing on the New Zealand rugby sevens team in the Sevens World Series. He was a gold medalist in rugby sevens at the 2010 Commonwealth Games. In 2011, Souness won a Ranfurly Shield playing with Taranaki.
