= 2012 Super Rugby season =

Men's rugby union club competition

- Countries: Australia (5 teams); New Zealand (5 teams); South Africa (5 teams)
- Tournament format(s): Round-robin and knockout
- Champions: Chiefs (1st title)
- Matches played: 125
- Attendance: 2,712,656 (21,701 per match)
- Tries scored: 609 (4.87 per match)
- Top point scorer(s): Aaron Cruden (251)
- Top try scorer(s): Andre Taylor (10); Bjorn Basson (10)
- Official website: Official site

The 2012 Super Rugby season was the second season of the Super Rugby competition, an annual rugby union competition that involves teams from Australia, New Zealand and South Africa, in its 15-team format. For sponsorship reasons, this competition is known as FxPro Super Rugby in Australia, Investec Super Rugby in New Zealand and Vodacom Super Rugby in South Africa. Including its past incarnations as Super 12 and Super 14, this was the 17th season for the Southern Hemisphere's premier transnational club competition. The conference games took place every weekend from 24 February until 14 July (with a three-week break between rounds 15 and 16 for international matches), followed by the finals series, culminating in the grand final on 4 August. While its three main broadcasting partners are Fox Sports (Australia), Sky Sport (New Zealand) and SuperSport (South Africa), Super Rugby can be viewed in many countries throughout the world.

The Chiefs, based in Hamilton, New Zealand, claimed their first-ever title in the competition's history, defeating the Durban-based Sharks 37–6 in the final held on 4 August at the Chiefs' home of Waikato Stadium.

== Competition format ==
Covering 24 weeks, the schedule featured a total of 125 matches. The 15 teams are grouped by geography, labelled the Australian Conference, New Zealand Conference and the South African Conference. The regular season consists of two types of matches:

- Internal Conference Matches – Each team plays the other four teams in the same conference twice, home and away.
- Cross Conference Matches – Each team plays four teams of the other two conferences away, and four teams of the other two conferences home, thus missing out on two teams (one from each of the other conferences). Each team plays two home and two away games against teams from each of the other countries, making a total of eight cross conference games for each team. There will be a three-week international break between rounds 15 and 16 of the regular season.

The top team of each conference, plus the next top three teams in table points regardless of conference (wild card teams), advance to the finals. The top two conference winners, based on table points, receive first-round byes. In the first round of the finals, the third conference winner is the No. 3 seed and hosts the wild card team with the worst record, and the best wild card team hosts the second-best wild card team. In the semi-finals, the No. 2 conference winner hosts the higher surviving seed from the first round, and the No. 1 conference winner hosts the other first-round winner. The final is hosted by the top remaining seed.

== Standings ==
Australian Conference
Pos	Team	Rnd	W	D	L	Bye	PF	PA	PD	TF	TA	TB	LB	Pts
1	Reds	18	11	0	5	2	359	347	+12	38	36	4	2	58
2	Brumbies	18	10	0	6	2	404	331	+73	41	31	5	5	58
3	Waratahs	18	4	0	12	2	346	407	−61	33	43	3	8	35
4	Rebels	18	4	0	12	2	362	520	−158	37	59	3	5	32
5	Force	18	3	0	13	2	306	440	−134	30	49	2	5	27

New Zealand Conference
Pos	Team	Rnd	W	D	L	Bye	PF	PA	PD	TF	TA	TB	LB	Pts
1	Chiefs	18	12	0	4	2	444	358	+86	47	30	5	3	64
2	Crusaders	18	11	0	5	2	485	343	+142	47	34	5	4	61
3	Hurricanes	18	10	0	6	2	489	429	+60	58	39	8	1	57
4	Highlanders	18	9	0	7	2	359	385	−26	36	31	2	4	50
5	Blues	18	4	0	12	2	359	430	−71	34	50	2	6	32

South African Conference
Pos	Team	Rnd	W	D	L	Bye	PF	PA	PD	TF	TA	TB	LB	Pts
1	Stormers	18	14	0	2	2	350	254	+96	28	21	0	2	66
2	Bulls	18	10	0	6	2	472	369	+103	50	38	6	5	59
3	Sharks	18	10	0	6	2	436	348	+88	47	31	7	4	59
4	Cheetahs	18	5	0	11	2	391	458	−67	35	47	3	7	38
5	Lions	18	3	0	13	2	317	460	−143	30	52	2	3	25

Overall standings
Pos	Team	Rnd	W	D	L	Bye	PF	PA	PD	TF	TA	TB	LB	Pts
1	(South Africa) Stormers	18	14	0	2	2	350	254	+96	28	21	0	2	66
2	(New Zealand) Chiefs	18	12	0	4	2	444	358	+86	47	30	5	3	64
3	(Australia) Reds	18	11	0	5	2	359	347	+12	38	36	4	2	58
4	(New Zealand) Crusaders	18	11	0	5	2	485	343	+142	47	34	5	4	61
5	(South Africa) Bulls	18	10	0	6	2	472	369	+103	50	38	6	5	59
6	(South Africa) Sharks	18	10	0	6	2	436	348	+88	47	31	7	4	59
7	(Australia) Brumbies	18	10	0	6	2	404	331	+73	41	31	5	5	58
8	(New Zealand) Hurricanes	18	10	0	6	2	489	429	+60	58	39	8	1	57
9	(New Zealand) Highlanders	18	9	0	7	2	359	385	−26	36	31	2	4	50
10	(South Africa) Cheetahs	18	5	0	11	2	391	458	−67	35	47	3	7	38
11	(Australia) Waratahs	18	4	0	12	2	346	407	−61	33	43	3	8	35
12	(New Zealand) Blues	18	4	0	12	2	359	430	−71	34	50	2	6	32
13	(Australia) Rebels	18	4	0	12	2	362	520	−158	37	59	3	5	32
14	(Australia) Force	18	3	0	13	2	306	440	−134	30	49	2	5	27
15	(South Africa) Lions	18	3	0	13	2	317	460	−143	30	52	2	3	25

Source: sanzarrugby.com

Legend:

- Rnd = Round completed (games played plus byes), W = Games won, D = Games drawn, L = Games lost, Bye = Number of byes, PF = Points for, PA = Points against, PD = Points difference, TF = Tries for, TA = Tries against, TB = Try bonus points, LB = Losing bonus points, Pts = Log points, Q = Qualification

Points breakdown:

- 4 points for a win
- 2 points for a draw
- 4 points for a bye
- 1 bonus point for a loss by seven points or less
- 1 bonus point for scoring four or more tries in a match

The overall standings classification system:

- Three conference winners/leaders in log points order
- Three wildcard teams in log points order
- The remaining nine teams in log points order
- When teams are level on log points, they are sorted by number of games won, then overall points difference, then number of tries scored and then overall try difference

=== Round-by-round ===
Team progression – 2012 Super Rugby season
Team	R1	R2	R3	R4	R5	R6	R7	R8	R9	R10	R11	R12	R13	R14	R15	R16	R17	Final
Stormers	4 (1st)	8 (4th)	12 (3rd)	16 (2nd)	20 (1st)	24 (1st)	28 (1st)	29 (2nd)	33 (2nd)	37 (2nd)	41 (4th)	45 (4th)	49 (1st)	50 (2nd)	54 (2nd)	58 (2nd)	62 (2nd)	66 (1st)
Chiefs	1 (12th)	6 (7th)	10 (6th)	14 (4th)	18 (2nd)	22 (4th)	26 (2nd)	31 (1st)	35 (1st)	39 (1st)	44 (1st)	45 (2nd)	49 (2nd)	53 (1st)	58 (1st)	62 (1st)	63 (1st)	64 (2nd)
Reds	4 (3rd)	8 (2nd)	12 (1st)	13 (3rd)	13 (8th)	13 (9th)	17 (8th)	21 (9th)	21 (10th)	25 (9th)	26 (9th)	31 (9th)	36 (8th)	40 (8th)	44 (9th)	49 (7th)	53 (8th)	58 (3rd)
Crusaders	4 (7th)	5 (9th)	6 (10th)	10 (9th)	14 (7th)	18 (6th)	19 (7th)	23 (7th)	28 (6th)	33 (6th)	37 (5th)	37 (5th)	42 (5th)	46 (5th)	51 (4th)	52 (5th)	56 (4th)	61 (4th)
Bulls	4 (4th)	9 (1st)	10 (5th)	14 (5th)	19 (4th)	20 (5th)	24 (4th)	29 (4th)	33 (4th)	37 (4th)	42 (2nd)	46 (1st)	47 (4th)	48 (4th)	49 (5th)	54 (4th)	54 (5th)	59 (5th)
Sharks	1 (13th)	2 (12th)	7 (9th)	11 (7th)	12 (10th)	17 (7th)	17 (9th)	22 (8th)	23 (9th)	27 (7th)	31 (7th)	36 (6th)	41 (6th)	45 (6th)	45 (7th)	49 (8th)	54 (6th)	59 (6th)
Brumbies	4 (5th)	8 (5th)	12 (4th)	13 (6th)	17 (3rd)	18 (3rd)	19 (3rd)	24 (3rd)	26 (3rd)	31 (3rd)	35 (3rd)	39 (3rd)	44 (3rd)	45 (3rd)	49 (3rd)	54 (3rd)	58 (3rd)	58 (7th)
Hurricanes	0 (15th)	4 (10th)	9 (7th)	10 (8th)	15 (6th)	16 (8th)	21 (6th)	25 (6th)	25 (8th)	25 (10th)	30 (8th)	34 (8th)	35 (9th)	40 (9th)	45 (6th)	49 (6th)	53 (7th)	57 (8th)
Highlanders	4 (2nd)	8 (3rd)	12 (2nd)	16 (1st)	17 (5th)	22 (2nd)	22 (5th)	26 (5th)	30 (5th)	34 (5th)	34 (6th)	35 (7th)	39 (7th)	44 (7th)	44 (8th)	45 (9th)	46 (9th)	50 (9th)
Cheetahs	1 (14th)	1 (15th)	2 (14th)	6 (12th)	7 (13th)	12 (12th)	16 (11th)	17 (11th)	21 (11th)	22 (11th)	26 (10th)	27 (10th)	27 (12th)	32 (10th)	36 (10th)	37 (10th)	38 (10th)	38 (10th)
Waratahs	1 (11th)	6 (6th)	7 (8th)	8 (11th)	13 (9th)	13 (10th)	17 (10th)	21 (10th)	25 (7th)	26 (8th)	26 (11th)	27 (11th)	28 (11th)	30 (11th)	30 (11th)	34 (11th)	35 (11th)	35 (11th)
Blues	1 (9th)	1 (13th)	5 (11th)	5 (14th)	6 (15th)	10 (13th)	10 (14th)	11 (14th)	12 (15th)	12 (15th)	12 (15th)	16 (14th)	16 (14th)	17 (14th)	19 (15th)	23 (14th)	28 (13th)	32 (12th)
Rebels	4 (8th)	4 (11th)	5 (13th)	6 (13th)	10 (12th)	10 (15th)	14 (12th)	14 (12th)	14 (13th)	18 (12th)	20 (12th)	24 (12th)	29 (10th)	29 (12th)	29 (12th)	29 (12th)	31 (12th)	32 (13th)
Force	1 (10th)	1 (14th)	1 (15th)	5 (15th)	7 (15th)	12 (11th)	12 (13th)	13 (13th)	17 (12th)	17 (13th)	18 (13th)	18 (13th)	19 (13th)	23 (13th)	27 (13th)	27 (13th)	27 (14th)	27 (14th)
Lions	4 (6th)	5 (8th)	5 (12th)	9 (10th)	10 (11th)	10 (14th)	10 (15th)	10 (15th)	14 (14th)	14 (14th)	14 (14th)	14 (15th)	14 (15th)	15 (15th)	20 (14th)	20 (15th)	25 (15th)	25 (15th)
The table above shows a team's progression throughout the season. For each round, their cumulative points total is shown with the overall log position in brackets.
Key:	win	draw	loss	bye														

== Regular season ==
The following fixtures were released on 2 September 2011.

=== Round 1 ===
24 February 2012	Blues	18–19	Crusaders	Eden Park, Auckland
19:35	Try: Chris Lowrey 5'; David Raikuna 9'; Con: Michael Hobbs 6' (1/2); Pen: Michael Hobbs 42', 56' (2/3); Drop: Piri Weepu (0/1)	Report	Try: Robbie Fruean 19'; Con: Tyler Bleyendaal 20' (1/1); Pen: Tyler Bleyendaal 8', 14', 30', 65' (4/6); Drop: Andy Ellis (0/1)	Attendance: 32,000; Referee: Chris Pollock

24 February 2012	Brumbies	19–17	Force	Canberra Stadium, Canberra
19:40	Try: Jesse Mogg 44'; Robbie Coleman 50'; Con: Nic White (0/2); Pen: Nic White 4', 6', 11' (3/6); Matt To'omua (0/1)	Report	Try: James Stannard 55'; Con: James Stannard (0/1); Pen: James Stannard 2', 9', 30', 36' (4/6); Drop: James Stannard (0/1)	Attendance: 14,211; Referee: Bryce Lawrence

24 February 2012	Bulls	18–13	Sharks	Loftus Versfeld, Pretoria
19:10	Pen: Morné Steyn 43', 49', 54', 56', 58' (5/7); Drop: Morné Steyn 68' (1/1)	Report	Try: Jacques Botes 71'; Con: Patrick Lambie 72' (1/1); Pen: Patrick Lambie 46', 61' (2/4); Riaan Viljoen (0/1)	Attendance: 48,112; Referee: Jonathan Kaplan

25 February 2012	Chiefs	19–23	Highlanders	Waikato Stadium, Hamilton
19:35	Try: Lelia Masaga 14'; Con: Aaron Cruden 15' (1/1); Pen: Aaron Cruden 5', 32', 37', 50' (4/4)	Report	Try: Aaron Smith 61'; Phil Burleigh 65'; Con: Chris Noakes 62', 66' (2/2); Pen: Chris Noakes 2', 12', 27' (3/3)	Attendance: 12,058; Referee: Jonathon White

25 February 2012	Waratahs	21–25	Reds	ANZ Stadium, Sydney
19:40	Try: Wycliff Palu 38'; Sarel Pretorius 67'; Con: Daniel Halangahu 68' (1/2); Pen: Daniel Halangahu 3', 42', 61' (3/4)	Report	Try: Dom Shipperley 80'; Con: Mike Harris 80+1' (1/1); Pen: Mike Harris 8', 21', 33', 40', 46', 73' (6/6)	Attendance: 32,071; Referee: Jaco Peyper

25 February 2012	Stormers	39–26	Hurricanes	DHL Newlands, Cape Town
17:05	Try: Gio Aplon 5'; Siya Kolisi 28' penalty try 72'; Con: Joe Pietersen 6', 29', 73' (3/3); Pen: Joe Pietersen 15', 18', 56', 60', 67' (5/7); Drop: Gary van Aswegen 37' (1/1)	Report	Try: Tim Bateman 40'; Beauden Barrett 47'; Con: Beauden Barrett 40', 48' (2/2); Pen: Beauden Barrett 7', 23', 34', 62' (4/4); Cards: Tristan Moran (yellow card) 27'; Ben May (yellow card) 35'; Jeremy Thrush 45'; Jeffery Toomaga-Allen (yellow card) 72'	Attendance: 36,825; Referee: Marius Jonker

25 February 2012	Lions	27–25	Cheetahs	Coca-Cola Park, Johannesburg
19:10	Pen: Elton Jantjies 5', 12', 17', 31', 45', 47', 54', 65', 73' (9/11); Drop: Elton Jantjies (0/1)	Report	Try: W. P. Nel 9' c Con: Johan Goosen (1/1) 10'; Pen: Johan Goosen 15', 28', 38', 42', 50' (5/5); Tewis de Bruyn (0/1); Sias Ebersohn (0/1); Drop: Johan Goosen (1/1) 36'; Cards: Andries Strauss (yellow card) 12'; Andries Strauss 12'; Johan Goosen (yellow card) 54'	Attendance: 20,245; Referee: Mark Lawrence

Bye/s: Rebels

=== Round 2 ===
2 March 2012	Chiefs	29–14	Blues	Waikato Stadium, Hamilton
19:35	Try: Sona Taumalolo 4'; Asaeli Tikoirotuma 23'; Tawera Kerr-Barlow 30'; Tim Nanai-Williams 34'; Con: Aaron Cruden 5', 24', 31' (3/4); Pen: Aaron Cruden 8' (1/2)	Report	Try: Sherwin Stowers 77'; Con: Gareth Anscombe (0/1); Pen: Michael Hobbs 15', 22', 55' (3/5); Drop: Michael Hobbs (0/1)	Attendance: 12,133; Referee: Keith Brown

2 March 2012	Rebels	19–35	Waratahs	AAMI Park, Melbourne
19:40	Try: penalty try 65'; Con: James O'Connor 65' (1/1); Pen: James O'Connor 4', 16', 58', 61' (4/4); Cards: Adam Byrnes 29'	Report	Try: Tom Carter (2) 11', 28'; Sekope Kepu 39'; Bernard Foley 44'; Con: Daniel Halangahu 12', 40', 45' (3/4); Pen: Bernard Foley 31' (1/1); Daniel Halangahu 63', 71' (2/3); Cards: Tatafu Polota-Nau (yellow card) 65'	Attendance: 16,491; Referee: Bryce Lawrence

2 March 2012	Lions	28–30	Hurricanes	Coca-Cola Park, Johannesburg
19:10	Try: Jaco Taute 9'; Franco van der Merwe 55'; Butch James 71'; Con: Elton Jantjies 56', 72' (2/3); Pen: Jaco Taute 19' (1/2); Elton Jantjies 46', 67' (2/2); Drop: Elton Jantjies (0/1)	Report	Try: Andre Taylor 36'; Dane Coles 59'; Cory Jane 61'; Con: Beauden Barrett (0/3); Pen: Beauden Barrett 5', 14', 30', 53', 79' (5/5)	Attendance: 15,141; Referee: Steve Walsh

3 March 2012	Highlanders	27–24	Crusaders	Forsyth Barr Stadium, Dunedin
19:35	Try: Andrew Hore 16'; Phil Burleigh 39'; Hosea Gear 69'; Con: Lima Sopoaga 17', 40', 70' (3/3); Pen: Lima Sopoaga 3', 30' (2/4)	Report	Try: Israel Dagg 14'; Andy Ellis 48'; Con: Tyler Bleyendaal 15' (1/2); Pen: Tyler Bleyendaal 11', 42', 54', 65' (4/6); Drop: Andy Ellis (0/1); Tyler Bleyendaal (0/1); Cards: Owen Franks 58'	Attendance: 23,600; Referee: Jaco Peyper

3 March 2012	Reds	35–20	Force	Suncorp Stadium, Brisbane
18:40	Try: Ben Tapuai 20'; Radike Samo 35'; Con: Mike Harris 21', 36' (2/2); Pen: Mike Harris 9', 33', 40', 43', 58', 75', 79' (7/7); Drop: Will Genia (0/1)	Report	Try: David Pocock 50'; James Stannard 55'; Con: James Stannard 51', 56' (2/2); Pen: James Stannard 25', 27' (2/3)	Attendance: 33,563; Referee: Ian Smith

3 March 2012	Cheetahs	19–51	Bulls	Free State Stadium, Bloemfontein
17:05	Try: Adriaan Strauss 65'; Con: Johan Goosen 66' (1/1); Pen: Johan Goosen 3', 26', 32', 39' (4/4); Drop: Johan Goosen (0/1)	Report	Try: Dean Greyling 10'; Werner Kruger 28'; Bjorn Basson 35'; Zane Kirchner (2) 40', 71'; JJ Engelbrecht 68'; Con: Morné Steyn 11', 29', 36', 40', 69', 72' (6/6); Pen: Morné Steyn 7', 56', 58' (3/4); Cards: Francois Hougaard (red card) 63'; Jacques Potgieter (yellow card) 77'	Attendance: 30,242; Referee: Craig Joubert

3 March 2012	Stormers	15–12	Sharks	DHL Newlands, Cape Town
19:10	Pen: Joe Pietersen 15', 17', 54' (3/7); Peter Grant 61', 78' (2/2)	Scoreboard	Pen: Patrick Lambie 12', 21', 37', 74' (4/6); Drop: Riaan Viljoen (0/1); Patrick Lambie (0/1); Cards: Ross Skeate (yellow card) 60'	Attendance: 40,702; Referee: Mark Lawrence

Bye/s: Brumbies

=== Round 3 ===
9 March 2012	Crusaders	19–24	Chiefs	McLean Park, Napier
19:35	Try: Robert Fruean 49'; Con: Tyler Bleyendaal 50' (1/1); Pen: Tyler Bleyendaal 9', 35', 61', 64' (4/5)	Report	Try: Liam Messam 26'; Sona Taumalolo 57'; Con: Aaron Cruden 27' (1/2); Pen: Aaron Cruden 2', 22', 38', 77' (4/7)	Attendance: 12,500; Referee: Garratt Williamson

9 March 2012	Force	19–46	Hurricanes	{{{s}}}, [[{{{slan}}}]]
19:05	Try: Matt Hodgson 19'; Con: James Stannard 20' (1/1); Pen: James Stannard 33', 47', 57', 60' (4/6)	Report	Try: TJ Perenara (3) 9', 35', 49'; Andre Taylor 38'; Jason Eaton 75'; Charlie Ngatai 80'; Con: Beauden Barrett 10', 36', 50' (3/4); Dan Kirkpatrick 76', 80+1' (2/2); Pen: Beauden Barrett 5' (1/1); Dan Kirkpatrick 63' (1/1)	Attendance: 15,768; Referee: Jaco Peyper

10 March 2012	Brumbies	24–23	Cheetahs	Canberra Stadium, Canberra
15:35	Try: Henry Speight 9'; Pat McCabe 52'; Con: Christian Lealiifano 10' (1/2); Pen: Christian Lealiifano 37', 65', 75', 80+1' (4/4)	Report	Try: Willie le Roux 18'; Tewis de Bruyn 41'; Con: Johan Goosen 19', 42' (2/2); Pen: Johan Goosen 2', 40', 48' (3/4); Drop: Johan Goosen (0/1)	Attendance: 12,377; Referee: Keith Brown

10 March 2012	Highlanders	18–17	Waratahs	Forsyth Barr Stadium, Dunedin
19:35	Try: Aaron Smith 15'; John Hardie 49'; Con: Lima Sopoaga (0/1); Colin Slade 50' (1/1); Pen: Colin Slade 40', 66' (2/5)	Report	Try: Pat McCutcheon 45'; Con: Daniel Halangahu (0/1); Pen: Daniel Halangahu 4', 13', 37', 53' (4/5)	Attendance: 17,670; Referee: Bryce Lawrence

10 March 2012	Reds	11–6	Rebels	Suncorp Stadium, Brisbane
19:40	Try: Dom Shipperley 55'; Con: Mike Harris (0/1); Pen: Mike Harris 37', 64' (2/4)	Report	Pen: James O'Connor 12', 33' (2/3)	Attendance: 34,126; Referee: Angus Gardner

10 March 2012	Sharks	32–20	Lions	Mr Price Kings Park, Durban
17:05	Try: Riaan Viljoen 30'; Lwazi Mvovo 40'; Meyer Bosman 71'; Jacques Botes 80'; Con: Patrick Lambie 31', 40', 72' (3/4); Pen: Patrick Lambie 23', 59' (2/3)	Report	Try: Jaco Taute 60'; Ruan Dreyer 75'; Con: Butch James 61', 75' (2/2); Pen: Butch James 6', 36' (2/2)	Attendance: 23,905; Referee: Mark Lawrence

10 March 2012	Bulls	23–29	Blues	Loftus Versfeld, Pretoria
19:10	Try: Pierre Spies 15'; Bjorn Basson (2) 72', 80'; Con: Morné Steyn 80+1' (1/3); Pen: Morné Steyn 28', 54' (2/4)	Report	Try: Gareth Anscombe (2) 2', 38'; Con: Gareth Anscombe 3', 39' (2/2); Pen: Gareth Anscombe 10', 35', 58', 68', 78' (5/7); Cards: Ali Williams (yellow card) 13'; Rene Ranger (yellow card) 80'; Rene Ranger 80'	Attendance: 31,582; Referee: Steve Walsh

Bye/s: Stormers

=== Round 4 ===
16 March 2012	Chiefs	29–22	Brumbies	Baypark Stadium, Mount Maunganui
19:35	Try: Sona Taumalolo 68'; Jackson Willison 79'; Con: Aaron Cruden 69', 80' (2/2); Pen: Aaron Cruden 10', 14', 27', 49', 55' (5/5)	Report	Try: Sam Carter 75'; Con: Christian Lealiifano (1/1); Pen: Christian Lealiifano 4', 21', 35', 45', 64' (5/6)	Attendance: 12,238; Referee: Ian Smith

16 March 2012	Stormers	27–17	Blues	DHL Newlands, Cape Town
19:10	Try: Bryan Habana 14'; Jean de Villiers 52'; Con: Joe Pietersen 53' (1/2); Pen: Joe Pietersen 6', 11', 31', 40', 73' (5/6); Drop: Joe Pietersen (0/1)	Report	Try: Benson Stanley 57'; Charlie Faumuina 64'; Con: Gareth Anscombe 58', 64' (2/2); Pen: Lachie Munro 28' (1/2); Gareth Anscombe (0/1)	Attendance: 38,041; Referee: Glen Jackson

17 March 2012	Hurricanes	17–19	Highlanders	Westpac Stadium, Wellington
19:35	Try: Cory Jane 37'; Con: Beauden Barrett (0/1); Pen: Andre Taylor (0/1); Beauden Barrett 29', 32', 40', 69' (4/4)	Report	Try: Colin Slade 15'; Con: Colin Slade 16' (1/1); Pen: Colin Slade 4', 25', 49' (3/4); Chris Noakes 75' (1/1)	Attendance: 14,700; Referee: Keith Brown

17 March 2012	Waratahs	20–21	Force	Allianz Stadium, Sydney
19:40	Try: Adam Ashley-Cooper 4'; Tom Kingston 37'; Con: Daniel Halangahu 5', 38' (2/2); Pen: Daniel Halangahu 55, 61' (2/3); Cards: Dean Mumm (yellow card) 16'	Report	Try: David Harvey 17'; Samu Wara 63'; Con: David Harvey 18' (1/2); Pen: David Harvey 10', 40', 51' (3/3); Drop: James Stannard (0/1)	Attendance: 14,673; Referee: Jonathon White

17 March 2012	Sharks	27–22	Reds	Mr Price Kings Park, Durban
17:05	Try: Jandré Marais 34'; Keegan Daniel 54'; Riaan Viljoen 60'; Con: Patrick Lambie 35', 55', 61' (3/3); Pen: Patrick Lambie 40', 41' (2/2)	Report	Try: James Hanson 10'; Scott Higginbotham 25'; Nick Frisby 57'; Con: Mike Harris 11' (1/1); Ben Lucas 26' (1/1); Will Genia (0/1); Pen: Mike Harris (0/1); Ben Lucas 32' (1/1); Will Genia (0/1); Cards: Digby Ioane (yellow card) 39'	Attendance: 21,479; Referee: Jonathan Kaplan

18 March 2012	Rebels	26–33	Cheetahs	AAMI Park, Melbourne
16:10	Try: Adam Freier 8'; James O'Connor 49'; Con: James O'Connor 9', 50' (2/2); Pen: James O'Connor 29', 43', 61', 64' (4/5)	Report	Try: Willie le Roux (2) 2', 10'; Piet van Zyl 80+2'; Con: Johan Goosen 3', 11', 80+3' (3/3); Pen: Johan Goosen 17', 23', 54', 66' (4/6); Cards: Willie le Roux (yellow card) 28'	Attendance: 11,522; Referee: Garratt Williamson

Bye/s: Bulls, Crusaders, Lions

=== Round 5 ===
23 March 2012	Blues	25–26	Hurricanes	Eden Park, Auckland
19:35	Try: Ma'a Nonu 15'; Con: Lachie Munro 16' (1/1); Pen: Lachie Munro 7', 23', 37', 46', 53', 58' (6/7); Drop: Michael Hobbs (0/1)	Report	Try: Andre Taylor 17'; Cory Jane 33'; Conrad Smith (2) 40', 80'; Con: Beauden Barrett 18', 40', 80+1' (3/4); Pen: Beauden Barrett (0/1)	Attendance: 23,213; Referee: Steve Walsh

23 March 2012	Rebels	30–29	Force	AAMI Park, Melbourne
19:40	Try: Lachlan Mitchell 7'; Lloyd Johansson 15'; Danny Cipriani 22'; Con: Danny Cipriani 8', 16', 23' (3/3); Pen: Julian Huxley 29', 55' (2/4); Mark Gerrard 72' (1/1); Drop: Julian Huxley (0/1)	Report	Try: David Pocock 27'; Winston Stanley 32'; Alfie Mafi 44'; Nick Cummins 63'; Con: David Harvey 28', 45', 64' (3/4); Pen: David Harvey 48' (1/2); Drop: James Stannard (0/1)	Attendance: 10,982; Referee: Marius Jonker

24 March 2012	Waratahs	34–30	Sharks	Allianz Stadium, Sydney
15:35	Try: Brendan McKibbin 22'; Bernard Foley 53'; Tom Carter 57'; Tom Kingston 75'; Con: Brendan McKibbin 23', 54', 58' (3/3); Berrick Barnes 76' (1/1); Pen: Brendan McKibbin 12', 28' (2/2)	Report	Try: Lwazi Mvovo 3'; Keegan Daniel 25'; Bismarck du Plessis 49'; Con: Patrick Lambie 4', 26', 50' (3/3); Pen: Patrick Lambie 16', 64', 72' (3/4)	Attendance: 18,830; Referee: Chris Pollock

24 March 2012	Crusaders	28–21	Cheetahs	AMI Stadium (Addington), Christchurch
19:35	Try: Sean Maitland 36'; Robbie Fruean 43'; Israel Dagg 76'; Con: Tom Taylor 44', 77' (2/3); Pen: Tom Taylor 7', 31', 53' (3/4); Cards: Zac Guildford 49'	Report	Try: Johan Goosen 46'; Robert Ebersohn 64'; Con: Johan Goosen 65' (1/2); Pen: Johan Goosen 16', 49', 70' (3/3)	Attendance: 17,500; Referee: Keith Brown

24 March 2012	Brumbies	33–26	Highlanders	Canberra Stadium, Canberra
19:40	Try: Joe Tomane (2) 4', 15'; Michael Hooper 63'; Con: Christian Lealiifano 5', 16', 64' (3/3); Pen: Christian Lealiifano 21', 40', 47', 56' (4/4); Jesse Mogg (0/2)	Report	Try: Aaron Smith 35'; Shaun Treeby 48'; Con: Colin Slade 36', 49' (2/2); Pen: Colin Slade 24', 45' (2/2); Chris Noakes 58' (1/1); Drop: Colin Slade 9' (1/1)	Attendance: 12,269; Referee: Mark Lawrence

24 March 2012	Bulls	61–8	Reds	Loftus Versfeld, Pretoria
17:05	Try: Zane Kirchner 33'; Wynand Olivier 42'; Flip van der Merwe 55'; Jacques Potgieter 59'; Jano Vermaak 65'; CJ Stander 72'; JJ Engelbrecht 75'; Bjorn Basson 77'; Con: Morné Steyn 34', 43', 56', 60', 66' (5/5); Louis Fouché 73' (1/3); Pen: Morné Steyn 11', 26', 28' (3/3)	Report	Try: Dom Shipperley 61'; Con: Will Genia (0/1); Pen: Jono Lance 22' (1/3)	Attendance: 23,541; Referee: Jonathan Kaplan

24 March 2012	Lions	19–24	Stormers	Coca-Cola Park, Johannesburg
19:10	Try: Tian Meyer 30'; Con: Butch James 31' (1/1); Pen: Jaco Taute (0/1); Butch James 43', 47', 57' (3/3); Drop: Andries Coetzee 80' (1/1)	Report	Try: Tiaan Liebenberg 2'; Bryan Habana 14'; Con: Joe Pietersen 3' (1/2); Pen: Joe Pietersen 21', 26', 68', 78' (4/5)	Attendance: 30,376; Referee: Glen Jackson

Bye/s: Chiefs

=== Round 6 ===
30 March 2012	Highlanders	43–12	Rebels	Rugby Park, Invercargill
19:35	Try: Ben Smith (2) 33', 64'; Adam Thomson (3) 40', 43', 72'; Kade Poki 46'; Jamie Mackintosh 58'; Con: Chris Noakes 34', 47', 59', 65' (4/6); Phil Burleigh (0/1); Pen: Chris Noakes (0/1); Ben Smith (0/2); Cards: Doug Tietjens (yellow card) 78'	Report	Pen: James O'Connor 8', 17', 28', 39' (4/4); Cards: Lloyd Johansson (yellow card) 21'; Lloyd Johansson 21'	Attendance: 7,980; Referee: Marius Jonker

31 March 2012	Hurricanes	38–47	Cheetahs	Westpac Stadium, Wellington
17:30	Try: Dane Coles 3'; Beauden Barrett 15'; Andre Taylor 28'; TJ Perenara 31'; Con: Beauden Barrett 4', 16', 29' (3/4); Pen: Beauden Barrett 8', 20', 48', 59' (4/5)	Report	Try: Andries Strauss 10'; Hennie Daniller 34'; Rayno Benjamin 37'; Coenie Oosthuizen (2) 40', 69'; W. P. Nel 55'; Con: Johan Goosen 35', 38', 40', 70' (4/6); Pen: Johan Goosen 6', 26', 46' (3/3); Drop: Johan Goosen (0/1)	Attendance: 11,841; Referee: Ian Smith

31 March 2012	Chiefs	30–13	Waratahs	Waikato Stadium, Hamilton
19:35	Try: Robbie Robinson 9'; Sona Taumalolo 42'; Liam Messam 64'; Con: Aaron Cruden 10', 43', 65' (3/3); Pen: Aaron Cruden 31', 35', 62' (3/3)	Report	Try: Tom Kingston 5'; Con: Brendan McKibbin 6' (1/1); Pen: Brendan McKibbin 25', 48' (2/3)	Attendance: 11,643; Referee: Mike Fraser

31 March 2012	Brumbies	26–29	Sharks	Canberra Stadium, Canberra
19:40	Try: Jesse Mogg 28'; Nic White 80'; Con: Christian Lealiifano 29', 80' (2/2); Pen: Christian Lealiifano 17', 26', 38', 58' (4/4)	Report	Try: Riaan Viljoen (2) 21', 34'; Willem Alberts 44'; Lwazi Mvovo 62'; Con: Frédéric Michalak 35', 45', 63' (3/4); Pen: Frédéric Michalak 14' (1/1)	Attendance: 13,128; Referee: Keith Brown

31 March 2012	Force	45–19	Reds	{{{s}}}, [[{{{slan}}}]]
18:40	Try: James Stannard 8'; Nathan Sharpe 32'; Ben Seymour 44'; Samu Wara 69'; Matt Hodgson 74'; Con: David Harvey 33', 45', 70', 75' (4/5); Pen: David Harvey 3', 17', 19', 68' (4/4)	Report	Try: James Slipper 40'; Van Humphries 50'; Dom Shipperley 80+1'; Con: Dallan Murphy 51', 80+2' (2/3)	Attendance: 13,034; Referee: Garratt Williamson

31 March 2012	Lions	13–23	Crusaders	Coca-Cola Park, Johannesburg
17:05	Try: Pat Cilliers 37'; Con: Butch James 38' (1/1); Pen: Butch James 19', 24' (2/3)	Report	Try: Zac Guildford 31'; Sean Maitland 42'; Con: Tom Taylor 32', 43' (2/2); Pen: Tom Taylor 22', 49', 63' (3/4)	Attendance: 14,677; Referee: Jonathan Kaplan

31 March 2012	Stormers	20–17	Bulls	DHL Newlands, Cape Town
19:10	Try: Tiaan Liebenberg 40'; Con: Joe Pietersen (0/1); Pen: Joe Pietersen 12', 27', 35', 62' (4/4); Peter Grant 77' (1/1); Drop: Joe Pietersen (0/1)	Report	Try: Bjorn Basson 46'; Wynand Olivier 66'; Con: Morné Steyn 47', 68' (2/2); Pen: Morné Steyn 50' (1/3); Drop: Morné Steyn (0/1); Cards: Flip van der Merwe (yellow card) 42'	Attendance: 45,000; Referee: Craig Joubert

Bye/s: Blues

=== Round 7 ===
5 April 2012	Rebels	34–23	Blues	AAMI Park, Melbourne
19:40	Try: Kurtley Beale 11'; James O'Connor 66'; Gareth Delve 80'; Con: James O'Connor 67', 80+1' (2/3); Pen: James O'Connor 2', 18', 57', 61', 72' (5/7)	Report	Try: Rudi Wulf 43'; Chris Lowrey 77'; Con: Gareth Anscombe 44', 78' (2/2); Pen: Gareth Anscombe 7', 24', 33' (3/4)	Attendance: 15,246; Referee: Bryce Lawrence

6 April 2012	Hurricanes	42–18	Sharks	Yarrow Stadium, New Plymouth
19:35	Try: Andre Taylor 13'; Karl Lowe 19'; Julian Savea 40'; Conrad Smith 49'; Tim Bateman 56'; Jeremy Thrush 79'; Con: Beauden Barrett 14', 20', 80' (3/6); Pen: Beauden Barrett 33', 38' (2/5); Cards: Karl Lowe 32'	Report	Try: JP Pietersen 45'; Craig Burden 65'; Con: Frédéric Michalak 46' (1/1); Meyer Bosman (0/1); Pen: Frédéric Michalak 18', 42' (2/2); Cards: Jannie du Plessis 32'	Attendance: 10,422; Referee: Glen Jackson

6 April 2012	Reds	20–13	Brumbies	Suncorp Stadium, Brisbane
19:40	Try: Scott Higginbotham (2) 25', 29'; Con: Sam Lane 26', 30' (2/2); Pen: Sam Lane 51', 80' (2/4); Cards: Liam Gill (yellow card) 61'	Report	Try: Joe Tomane 68'; Con: Christian Lealiifano 69' (1/1); Pen: Christian Lealiifano 56', 62' (2/3)	Attendance: 31,479; Referee: Steve Walsh

6 April 2012	Force	12–20	Chiefs	{{{s}}}, [[{{{slan}}}]]
19:40	Pen: David Harvey 9', 21', 51', 57' (4/5)	Report	Try: Lelia Masaga 15'; Tim Nanai-Williams 48'; Con: Aaron Cruden 16', 49' (2/2); Pen: Aaron Cruden 53', 69' (2/3)	Attendance: 17,112; Referee: Jonathon White

7 April 2012	Highlanders	6–21	Stormers	Forsyth Barr Stadium, Dunedin
19:35	Pen: Chris Noakes 16', 39' (2/4)	Report	Try: Gio Aplon 13'; Joe Pietersen 32'; Con: Joe Pietersen (0/1); Peter Grant 33' (1/1); Pen: Joe Pietersen 6' (1/2); Peter Grant 52', 72' (2/2); Cards: Tiaan Liebenberg (yellow card) 66'	Attendance: 15,000; Referee: Chris Pollock

7 April 2012	Cheetahs	26–5	Lions	Free State Stadium, Bloemfontein
15:00	Try: Robert Ebersohn (2) 21', 35'; Con: Johan Goosen 22', 36' (2/2); Pen: Johan Goosen 20', 27', 30' (3/4); Sias Ebersohn 69' (1/1)	Report	Try: Cobus Grobbelaar 65'; Con: Elton Jantjies (0/1); Cards: Martin Bezuidenhout 27'	Attendance: 15,713; Referee: Mark Lawrence

7 April 2012	Bulls	32–30	Crusaders	Loftus Versfeld, Pretoria
17:05	Try: Dean Greyling 44'; Wynand Olivier 70'; Con: Morné Steyn 45', 71' (2/2); Pen: Morné Steyn 18', 23', 40', 43', 56', 61' (6/8); Drop: Morné Steyn (0/2)	Report	Try: Kieran Read 8'; Zac Guildford 73'; Tom Marshall 79'; Con: Dan Carter 9', 73', 79' (3/3); Pen: Dan Carter 13' (1/4); Tom Taylor 48' (1/1); Drop: Dan Carter 25' (1/1); Cards: Eye-gouging 38'	Attendance: 34,135; Referee: Jaco Peyper

Bye/s: Waratahs

=== Round 8 ===
13 April 2012	Blues	23–29	Sharks	Eden Park, Auckland
19:35	Try: Tony Woodcock 33'; Benson Stanley 42'; Con: Gareth Anscombe 34', 43' (2/2); Pen: Gareth Anscombe 20', 66' (2/2); Drop: Gareth Anscombe 39' (1/1)	Scoreboard	Try: Steven Sykes 3'; Craig Burden 17'; Keegan Daniel 45'; Tim Whitehead 48'; Con: Patrick Lambie 18', 46', 49' (3/4); Pen: Patrick Lambie 15' (1/2)	Attendance: 18,000; Referee: Steve Walsh

13 April 2012	Force	18–23	Waratahs	{{{s}}}, [[{{{slan}}}]]
19:10	Try: Brett Sheehan 50'; Alfie Mafi 58'; Con: David Harvey 59' (1/2); Pen: David Harvey 31', 62' (2/2); Cards: Salesi Ma'afu (yellow card) 37'	Scoreboard	Try: Tom Kingston 26'; Dave Dennis 42'; Con: Brendan McKibbin 27', 43' (2/2); Pen: Brendan McKibbin 15' (1/2); Berrick Barnes 65', 74' (2/3); Cards: Bernard Foley (yellow card) 56'	Attendance: 12,838; Referee: Glen Jackson

14 April 2012	Crusaders	31–24	Stormers	AMI Stadium (Addington), Christchurch
19:35	Try: Tom Taylor 14'; Con: Tom Taylor 15' (1/1); Pen: Tom Taylor 6', 26', 33', 40', 52', 67', 71', 77' (8/8); Drop: Andy Ellis (0/1); Cards: Wyatt Crockett (yellow card) 30'	Scoreboard	Try: Juan de Jongh 21'; Bryan Habana 59'; Con: Joe Pietersen 22' (1/2); Pen: Peter Grant 10', 80+4' (2/2); Joe Pietersen 39', 44' (2/2); Cards: Rynhardt Elstadt (yellow card) 66'	Attendance: 17,500; Referee: Chris Pollock

14 April 2012	Brumbies	37–6	Rebels	Canberra Stadium, Canberra
19:40	Try: Pat McCabe 18'; Michael Hooper 24'; Scott Fardy (2) 27', 67'; Ben Mowen 37'; Con: Christian Lealiifano 19', 38', 68' (3/5); Pen: Christian Lealiifano 2', 11' (2/2)	Scoreboard	Pen: Danny Cipriani 14' (1/1); James O'Connor 21' (1/1); Cards: Gareth Delve (yellow card) 32'	Attendance: 14,011; Referee: Craig Joubert

14 April 2012	Cheetahs	33–39	Chiefs	Free State Stadium, Bloemfontein
17:05	Try: Ashley Johnson 52'; Johan Goosen 78'; Con: Johan Goosen 53' (1/2); Pen: Sias Ebersohn 6', 24', 40', 50' (4/4); Johan Goosen 56', 62', 80+3' (3/3); Drop: Sias Ebersohn (0/0)	Scoreboard	Try: Lelia Masaga 20'; Sona Taumalolo (2) 47', 67'; Sonny Bill Williams 72'; Richard Kahui 74'; Con: Aaron Cruden 21', 48', 73', 75' (4/5); Pen: Aaron Cruden 9', 59' (2/2)	Attendance: 17,163; Referee: Jonathan Kaplan

14 April 2012	Lions	18–32	Bulls	Coca-Cola Park, Johannesburg
19:10	Try: Tian Meyer 2'; Josh Strauss 60'; Con: Elton Jantjies 3' (1/2); Pen: Jaco Taute 15' (1/2); Elton Jantjies 49' (1/1)	Scoreboard	Try: Akona Ndungane 18'; Francois Hougaard 28'; Zane Kirchner 40'; CJ Stander 41'; Juandré Kruger 52'; Con: Morné Steyn 29', 53' (2/5); Pen: Morné Steyn 26' (1/3)	Attendance: 35,375; Referee: Garratt Williamson

Bye/s: Highlanders, Hurricanes, Reds

=== Round 9 ===
20 April 2012	Highlanders	30–27	Blues	Forsyth Barr Stadium, Dunedin
19:35	Try: Shaun Treeby 12'; Kurt Baker 69'; Con: Mike Delany 13' (1/2); Pen: Mike Delany 16', 24', 37', 46', 51', 61' (6/7)	Scoreboard	Try: Hadleigh Parkes 4'; Rene Ranger 53'; Con: Gareth Anscombe 54' (1/2); Pen: Gareth Anscombe 26', 29', 34', 44', 48' (5/6)	Attendance: 18,417; Referee: Bryce Lawrence

20 April 2012	Reds	13–23	Stormers	Suncorp Stadium, Brisbane
19:40	Try: James Horwill 60'; Con: Mike Harris 61' (1/1); Pen: Ben Lucas 30' (1/2); Mike Harris 78' (1/2)	Scoreboard	Try: Gio Aplon 8'; Peter Grant 37'; Con: Peter Grant 9', 38' (2/2); Pen: Peter Grant 2', 53', 80' (3/3)	Attendance: 31,548; Referee: Steve Walsh

21 April 2012	Hurricanes	14–42	Crusaders	Westpac Stadium, Wellington
19:35	Try: Andre Taylor 39'; Victor Vito 46'; Con: Beauden Barrett 40', 47' (2/2); Pen: Andre Taylor (0/1); Beauden Barrett (0/1)	Scoreboard	Try: Kieran Read 5'; Dan Carter 23'; Robbie Fruean 30'; Israel Dagg (2) 36', 62'; Con: Tom Taylor 6', 24', 31', 63' (4/5); Pen: Tom Taylor 21', 29', 54' (3/4)	Attendance: 21,871; Referee: Craig Joubert

21 April 2012	Waratahs	30–21	Rebels	Allianz Stadium, Sydney
19:40	Try: Bernard Foley 1'; Tatafu Polota-Nau 46'; Rob Horne 57'; Con: Brendan McKibbin 2', 47', 58' (3/3); Pen: Brendan McKibbin 10', 17', 30' (3/3); Drop: Berrick Barnes (0/1); Cards: Rob Horne (yellow card) 60'	Scoreboard	Try: Ged Robinson 22'; Tim Davidson 63'; Lachlan Mitchell 73'; Con: James O'Connor 23' (1/1); Kurtley Beale 64' (1/1); Julian Huxley 74' (1/1); Pen: Danny Cipriani (0/1); Kurtley Beale (0/1)	Attendance: 17,673; Referee: Jonathan Kaplan

21 April 2012	Sharks	12–18	Chiefs	Mr Price Kings Park, Durban
17:05	Pen: Patrick Lambie 40', 48', 52', 67' (4/5)	Scoreboard	Try: Aaron Cruden 19'; Augustine Pulu 80+1'; Con: Aaron Cruden 20' (1/2); Pen: Aaron Cruden 30', 62' (2/3)	Attendance: 26,773; Referee: Garratt Williamson

21 April 2012	Bulls	36–34	Brumbies	Loftus Versfeld, Pretoria
19:10	Try: Bjorn Basson 24'; CJ Stander 58'; Con: Morné Steyn 25' (1/2); Pen: Morné Steyn 2', 7', 17', 34', 46', 62', 73' (7/8); Drop: Morné Steyn 43' (1/1)	Scoreboard	Try: Henry Speight 10'; Jesse Mogg 13'; Andrew Smith 69'; Ian Prior 77'; Anthony Hegarty 80'; Con: Christian Lealiifano 70', 78', 80+1' (3/5); Pen: Christian Lealiifano 28' (1/1); Jesse Mogg (0/1); Drop: Christian Lealiifano (0/1)	Attendance: 26,578; Referee: Marius Jonker

Bye/s: Cheetahs, Force, Lions

=== Round 10 ===
27 April 2012	Blues	11–23	Reds	Eden Park, Auckland
19:35	Try: Luke Braid 25'; Con: Gareth Anscombe (0/1); Pen: Gareth Anscombe 31', 56' (2/3)	Scoreboard	Try: Digby Ioane 1'; Luke Morahan 6'; Dom Shipperley 44'; Con: Mike Harris 7' (1/3); Pen: Mike Harris 35', 74' (2/3)	Attendance: 12,111; Referee: Craig Joubert

27 April 2012	Lions	20–34	Brumbies	Coca-Cola Park, Johannesburg
19:10	Try: Jaco Taute 64'; Caylib Oosthuizen 78'; Con: Elton Jantjies 65', 79' (2/2); Pen: Elton Jantjies 6', 15' (2/2); Cards: Butch James (yellow card) 62'		Try: Ruaidhri Murphy 11'; Henry Speight (2) 26', 57'; Andrew Smith 34'; Joe Tomane 45'; Ben Alexander 47'; Con: Christian Lealiifano 48' (1/3); Jesse Mogg 35' (1/3); Pen: Christian Lealiifano (0/1); Jesse Mogg (0/1)	Attendance: 14,162; Referee: Keith Brown

28 April 2012	Chiefs	33–14	Hurricanes	Waikato Stadium, Hamilton
19:35	Try: Lelia Masaga 45'; Sona Taumalolo 65'; Toby Smith 76'; Con: Aaron Cruden 46', 66', 77' (3/3); Pen: Aaron Cruden 5', 15', 25', 28' (4/5)	Scoreboard	Try: Andre Taylor 35'; Con: Beauden Barrett (0/1); Pen: Beauden Barrett 19', 49', 57' (3/4); Drop: Beauden Barrett (0/1)	Attendance: 22,119; Referee: Jonathon White

28 April 2012	Force	3–17	Stormers	nib Stadium, Perth
17:40	Pen: David Harvey 17' (1/2)	Report	Try: Bryan Habana 20'; Peter Grant 49'; Con: Peter Grant 21', 50' (2/2); Pen: Peter Grant 44' (1/1); Drop: Joe Pietersen (0/1)	Attendance: 11,550; Referee: Jaco Peyper

28 April 2012	Cheetahs	33–36	Highlanders	Free State Stadium, Bloemfontein
17:05	Try: Coenie Oosthuizen 12'; Andries Ferreira 37'; Johan Goosen 49'; Con: Johan Goosen 13', 38' (2/2); Sias Ebersohn 50' (1/1); Pen: Johan Goosen 4', 23', 27' (3/3); Sias Ebersohn 70' (1/4); Drop: Johan Goosen (0/1)	Scoreboard	Try: Chris Noakes 59'; Jimmy Cowan (2) 64', 65'; Con: Chris Noakes 59', 64', 66' (3/3); Pen: Mike Delany 10', 18', 40' (3/4); Chris Noakes 72', 79' (2/2); Cards: Andrew Hore (yellow card) 26'; James Haskell (yellow card) 33'	Attendance: 16,026; Referee: Mark Lawrence

29 April 2012	Waratahs	33–37	Crusaders	Allianz Stadium, Sydney
16:10	Try: Atieli Pakalani 11'; Wycliff Palu 46'; Sarel Pretorius 74'; Con: Brendan McKibbin 12', 47' (2/2); Berrick Barnes 75' (1/1); Pen: Brendan McKibbin 30', 40', 51', 66' (4/4)	Report	Try: Robbie Fruean (2) 17', 54'; Zac Guildford 34'; Adam Whitelock 49'; Con: Tom Taylor 18', 35', 50', 55' (4/4); Pen: Tom Taylor 42', 53', 69' (3/4)	Attendance: 30,663; Referee: Jonathan Kaplan

Bye/s: Bulls, Rebels, Sharks

=== Round 11 ===
4 May 2012	Hurricanes	35–19	Blues	Westpac Stadium, Wellington
19:35	Try: Conrad Smith 11'; Andre Taylor 33'; Julian Savea 58'; TJ Perenara 67'; Jason Eaton 79'; Con: Beauden Barrett 69', 80' (2/5); Pen: Beauden Barrett 20', 38' (2/2)	Scoreboard	Try: Benson Stanley 74'; Con: Lachie Munro 75' (1/1); Pen: Piri Weepu 4', 16', 23', 29' (4/5)	Attendance: 11,624; Referee: Jaco Peyper

4 May 2012	Rebels	35–41	Bulls	AAMI Park, Melbourne
19:40	Try: Rodney Blake 11'; Cooper Vuna (2) 15', 64'; Nick Phipps 34'; Gareth Delve 40'; Con: Kurtley Beale 12', 16', 35', 40', 65' (5/5); Cards: Luke Jones (yellow card) 25'	Scoreboard	Try: Akona Ndungane 6'; Bjorn Basson 19'; Morné Steyn 28'; CJ Stander 38'; JJ Engelbrecht 60'; Con: Morné Steyn 7', 20', 29', 39', 61' (5/5); Pen: Morné Steyn 26', 73' (2/2); Cards: Flip van der Merwe (yellow card) 21'	Attendance: 12,112; Referee: Andrew Lees

5 May 2012	Chiefs	34–21	Lions	ECOLight Stadium, Pukekohe
19:35	Try: Aaron Cruden 19'; Craig Clarke 28'; Lelia Masaga 49'; Brendon Leonard 56'; Con: Aaron Cruden 20', 29', 50', 57' (4/4); Pen: Aaron Cruden 4', 15' (2/2)	Scoreboard	Try: Cobus Grobbelaar (2) 34', 68'; Josh Strauss 53'; Con: Elton Jantjies 35', 54', 69' (3/3)	Attendance: 12,364; Referee: Ian Smith

5 May 2012	Brumbies	23–6	Waratahs	Canberra Stadium, Canberra
19:40	Try: Henry Speight 40'; Andrew Smith 45'; Con: Christian Lealiifano 40', 46' (2/2); Pen: Nic White (0/1); Christian Lealiifano 11', 27', 71' (3/5); Cards: Ben Mowen (yellow card) 74'	Scoreboard	Pen: Brendan McKibbin 17', 38' (2/3)	Attendance: 19,122; Referee: Chris Pollock

5 May 2012	Sharks	28–16	Highlanders	Mr Price Kings Park, Durban
17:05	Try: Patrick Lambie 62'; Con: Patrick Lambie 63' (1/1); Pen: Patrick Lambie 3', 11', 17', 19', 40', 67', 60' (7/7); Cards: Jacques Botes (yellow card) 32'	Scoreboard	Try: Kurt Baker 50'; Con: Mike Delany 51' (1/1); Pen: Mike Delany 7', 27', 33' (3/5)	Attendance: 18,730; Referee: Steve Walsh

5 May 2012	Cheetahs	17–13	Force	Free State Stadium, Bloemfontein
19:10	Try: Adriaan Strauss 54'; Con: Sias Ebersohn (0/1); Pen: Sias Ebersohn 13', 19', 60' (3/6) Tewis de Bruyn 37' (1/1)	Scoreboard	Try: Winston Stanley 46'; Con: David Harvey 47' (1/1); Pen: David Harvey 9', 34' (2/2)	Attendance: 14,263; Referee: Stuart Berry

6 May 2012	Crusaders	15–11	Reds	AMI Stadium (Addington), Christchurch
16:00	Pen: Tom Taylor 9', 22', 47', 73', 77' (5/6); Cards: Wyatt Crockett (yellow card) 61'	Scoreboard	Try: James Hanson 1'; Con: Mike Harris (0/1); Pen: Mike Harris 44', 62' (2/3)	Attendance: 17,800; Referee: Bryce Lawrence

Bye/s: Stormers

=== Round 12 ===
11 May 2012	Blues	25–3	Lions	Eden Park, Auckland
19:35	Try: Michael Hobbs 17'; Alby Mathewson 55'; Luke Braid 80'; Con: Gareth Anscombe 18', 80+1' (2/3); Pen: Gareth Anscombe 26', 46' (2/5)	Scoreboard	Pen: Elton Jantjies 6' (1/1); Cards: Deon van Rensburg (yellow card) 48'	Attendance: 10,127; Referee: Angus Gardner

11 May 2012	Waratahs	24–27	Bulls	Allianz Stadium, Sydney
19:40	Try: Rob Horne 16'; Atieli Pakalani 63'; Con: Berrick Barnes 17' (1/2); Pen: Berrick Barnes 13', 35', 48' (3/3); Brendan McKibbin 71' (1/1); Cards: Dean Mumm (yellow card) 23'	Scoreboard	Try: Francois Hougaard 24'; Akona Ndungane 58'; Werner Kruger 78'; Con: Morné Steyn 25', 59', 79' (3/3); Pen: Morné Steyn 10', 68' (2/2)	Attendance: 17,368; Referee: Chris Pollock

12 May 2012	Highlanders	20–26	Hurricanes	Forsyth Barr Stadium, Dunedin
19:35	Try: Chris Noakes 14'; Adam Thomson 21'; Con: Chris Noakes 15', 22' (2/2); Pen: Mike Delany 71' (1/1); Chris Noakes 48' (1/3)	Scoreboard	Try: Julian Savea 76'; Faifili Levave 49'; Con: Beauden Barrett 50', 77' (2/2); Pen: Beauden Barrett 65', 5', 26', 33' (4/5)	Attendance: 18,207; Referee: Glen Jackson

12 May 2012	Rebels	28–19	Crusaders	AAMI Park, Melbourne
19:40	Try: Nick Phipps (2) 12', 66'; Stirling Mortlock 69'; Con: Kurtley Beale 13', 67' (2/3); Pen: Kurtley Beale 25', 47', 54' (3/3)	Scoreboard	Try: Sam Whitelock 30'; Con: Tom Taylor 31' (1/1); Pen: Tom Taylor 16', 20', 34', 40' (4/4)	Attendance: 18,423; Referee: Jaco Peyper

12 May 2012	Sharks	53–11	Force	Mr Price Kings Park, Durban
17:05	Try: Steven Sykes 16'; Paul Jordaan 32'; Louis Ludik 41'; Lwazi Mvovo (2) 45', 50'; Craig Burden 68'; Jacques Botes 73'; Con: Patrick Lambie 17', 33' (2/2); Frédéric Michalak 42', 51', 69', 74' (4/5); Pen: Patrick Lambie 12', 40' (2/3); Cards: Craig Burden (yellow card) 78'	Scoreboard	Try: Samu Wara 80'; Con: Ben Seymour (0/1); Pen: David Harvey 6', 29' (2/2); Cards: Lachlan McCaffrey (yellow card) 60'	Attendance: 22,343; Referee: Mark Lawrence

12 May 2012	Stormers	16–14	Cheetahs	DHL Newlands, Cape Town
19:10	Try: Eben Etzebeth 23'; Con: Peter Grant 24' (1/1); Pen: Peter Grant 10', 13', 17' (3/4)	Scoreboard	Try: Hennie Daniller 48'; Willie le Roux 66'; Con: Riaan Smit 49', 67' (2/2); Pen: Sias Ebersohn (0/1)	Attendance: 47,890; Referee: Steve Walsh

13 May 2012	Reds	42–27	Chiefs	Suncorp Stadium, Brisbane
16:10	Try: Dom Shipperley 4'; Ben Lucas 40'; Scott Higginbotham 42'; Will Genia 47'; Saia Fainga'a 51'; Con: Mike Harris 40', 43', 48', 52' (4/5); Pen: Mike Harris 20', 76' (2/2); Drop: Mike Harris 64' (1/1)	Scoreboard	Try: Sonny Bill Williams 30'; Liam Messam 33'; Sona Taumalolo 38'; Asaeli Tikoirotuma 59'; Con: Aaron Cruden 31', 34' (2/4); Pen: Aaron Cruden 16' (1/1)	Attendance: 36,479; Referee: Marius Jonker

Bye/s: Brumbies

=== Round 13 ===
18 May 2012	Hurricanes	25–37	Brumbies	Westpac Stadium, Wellington
19:35	Try: TJ Perenara (2) 16', 43'; Victor Vito 29'; Jeffery Toomaga-Allen 51'; Con: Andre Taylor 30' (1/3); Beauden Barrett (0/1); Pen: Andre Taylor 23' (1/1); Beauden Barrett (0/1)	Scoreboard	Try: Fotu Auelua 9'; Sam Carter 54'; Michael Hooper 62'; Zack Holmes 69'; Con: Zack Holmes 10', 55', 63', 70' (4/4); Pen: Zack Holmes 6', 21', 48' (3/4); Jesse Mogg (0/1)	Attendance: 9,400; Referee: Mark Lawrence

19 May 2012	Highlanders	16–11	Bulls	Forsyth Barr Stadium, Dunedin
17:30	Try: Jarrad Hoeata 64'; Con: Mike Delany 65' (1/1); Pen: Mike Delany 68', 27', 48' (3/4)	Scoreboard	Try: Willie Wepener 74'; Con: Morné Steyn (0/1); Pen: Morné Steyn 14', 38' (2/4); Drop: Morné Steyn (0/1); Cards: Dean Greyling (yellow card) 56'	Attendance: 14,967; Referee: Ian Smith

19 May 2012	Crusaders	59–12	Blues	AMI Stadium (Addington), Christchurch
19:35	Try: Matt Todd 5'; Adam Whitelock 11'; Richie McCaw 21'; Luke Romano 36'; Corey Flynn (2) 40', 49'; Andy Ellis 43'; Zac Guildford 66'; Tom Marshall 76'; Con: Dan Carter 6', 22', 40', 44', 50', 67' (6/8); Tyler Bleyendaal 77' (1/1)	Scoreboard	Try: Lachie Munro (2) 60', 80+2'; Con: Gareth Anscombe 80+3' (1/2)	Attendance: 17,000; Referee: Bryce Lawrence

19 May 2012	Reds	34–20	Lions	Suncorp Stadium, Brisbane
19:40	Try: Liam Gill 20'; Saia Fainga'a 43'; Chris Feauai-Sautia 49'; Will Genia 55'; Con: Mike Harris 21', 44', 50', 56' (4/4); Pen: Mike Harris 25', 28' (2/2)	Scoreboard	Try: Martin Bezuidenhout 59'; Jaco Kriel 77'; Con: Elton Jantjies 60', 78' (2/2); Pen: Elton Jantjies 10', 17' (2/2); Drop: Andries Coetzee (0/1); Cards: Franco van der Merwe (yellow card) 43'	Attendance: 31,118; Referee: Keith Brown

19 May 2012	Cheetahs	20–34	Sharks	Free State Stadium, Bloemfontein
17:05	Try: Adriaan Strauss 32'; Con: Riaan Smit (0/1); Pen: Riaan Smit 15', 29', 37' (3/3); Sias Ebersohn 54', 60' (2/2)	Scoreboard	Try: JP Pietersen 3'; Frédéric Michalak 35'; Lwazi Mvovo 40'; Meyer Bosman 73'; Con: Frédéric Michalak 4', 36', 40', 74' (4/4); Pen: Frédéric Michalak 46', 67' (2/3); Drop: Riaan Viljoen (0/1); Cards: Bismarck du Plessis (yellow card) 53'	Attendance: 23,835; Referee: Jonathan Kaplan

19 May 2012	Stormers	19–13	Waratahs	DHL Newlands, Cape Town
19:10	Try: Joe Pietersen 17'; Tiaan Liebenberg 33'; Con: Peter Grant (0/2); Pen: Joe Pietersen 22' (1/1); Peter Grant 40', 50' (2/2)	Scoreboard	Try: Rob Horne 42'; Con: Brendan McKibbin 43' (1/1); Pen: Brendan McKibbin 10', 47' (2/3); Drop: Bernard Foley (0/1)	Attendance: 47,916; Referee: Craig Joubert

20 May 2012	Force	31–32	Rebels	{{{s}}}, [[{{{slan}}}]]
14:35	Try: Napolioni Nalaga 24'; Ben McCalman 29'; Alfie Mafi 44'; Con: David Harvey 30' (1/2); Ben Seymour 45' (1/1); Pen: David Harvey 16' (1/2); Brett Sheehan 59' (1/1); Ben Seymour 65', 73' (2/2); Cards: Matt Hodgson (yellow card) 69'	Scoreboard	Try: Cadeyrn Neville (2) 3', 26'; Gareth Delve 20'; Cooper Vuna 35'; Con: Kurtley Beale 4', 21', 27' (3/4); Pen: Kurtley Beale 62', 77' (2/2); Cards: Rodney Blake 58'	Attendance: 11,734; Referee: Marius Jonker

Bye/s: Chiefs

=== Round 14 ===
25 May 2012	Chiefs	28–22	Bulls	Waikato Stadium, Hamilton
19:35	Try: Andrew Horrell 24'; Asaeli Tikoirotuma 58'; Sam Cane 69'; Con: Aaron Cruden 59', 70' (2/3); Pen: Aaron Cruden 15', 46', 53' (3/3)	Scoreboard	Try: Bjorn Basson 40'; Con: Morné Steyn 40' (1/1); Pen: Morné Steyn 7', 35', 50', 62' (4/4); Drop: Morné Steyn 23' (1/2)	Attendance: 18,482; Referee: Mark Lawrence

26 May 2012	Hurricanes	66–24	Rebels	Westpac Stadium, Wellington
17:30	Try: Andre Taylor (2) 18', 56'; Alapati Leiua (2) 24', 43'; Julian Savea (3) 28', 30', 53'; Jack Lam 37'; Chris Eaton 68'; Con: Beauden Barrett 19', 25', 29', 31', 38', 44', 54', 57', 69' (9/9); Pen: Beauden Barrett 11' (1/1)	Scoreboard	Try: Cooper Vuna (2) 8', 32'; Adam Freier 80+1'; Con: Kurtley Beale 9', 33' (2/2); Richard Kingi 80+2' (1/1); Pen: Kurtley Beale 14' (1/1)	Attendance: 11,474; Referee: Jonathon White

26 May 2012	Blues	20–27	Highlanders	Eden Park, Auckland
19:35	Try: Tevita Mailau 68'; Tony Woodcock 77'; Con: Gareth Anscombe 69' (1/1); Lachie Munro 78' (1/1); Pen: Gareth Anscombe 8', 33' (2/3)	Scoreboard	Try: Tamati Ellison 25'; Hosea Gear (2) 35', 41'; Adam Thomson 59'; Con: Chris Noakes 36', 60' (2/4); Pen: Chris Noakes 20' (1/1); Cards: Phil Burleigh (yellow card) 62'	Attendance: 14,111; Referee: Glen Jackson

26 May 2012	Brumbies	12–13	Reds	Canberra Stadium, Canberra
19:40	Pen: Zack Holmes 28', 36', 47', 54' (4/5)	Scoreboard	Try: Luke Morahan 3'; Con: Mike Harris 4' (1/1); Pen: Mike Harris 40', 51' (2/2)	Attendance: 16,123; Referee: Steve Walsh

26 May 2012	Force	17–11	Lions	{{{s}}}, [[{{{slan}}}]]
19:40	Try: David Pocock 58'; Napolioni Nalaga 71'; Con: Ben Seymour 59', 72' (2/2); Pen: Ben Seymour 23' (1/2)		Try: Michael Killian 4'; Con: Elton Jantjies (0/1); Pen: Elton Jantjies 12' (1/1); Ruan Combrinck 80+3' (1/1); Cards: CJ van der Linde 12'	Attendance: 10,434; Referee: Garratt Williamson

26 May 2012	Cheetahs	35–34	Waratahs	Free State Stadium, Bloemfontein
17:05	Try: Piet van Zyl 14'; Willie le Roux (2) 19', 57'; Adriaan Strauss 26'; W. P. Nel 54'; Con: Riaan Smit 15', 20', 27', 55' (4/4); Sias Ebersohn 58' (1/1); Drop: Sias Ebersohn (0/1)		Try: Dave Dennis 4'; Sitaleki Timani (2) 6', 36'; Rob Horne 33'; Con: Brendan McKibbin 5', 7', 34', 37' (4/4); Pen: Brendan McKibbin 22', 48' (2/2); Berrick Barnes (0/1)	Attendance: 15,987; Referee: Craig Joubert

26 May 2012	Sharks	25–20	Stormers	Mr Price Kings Park, Durban
19:10	Try: Frédéric Michalak 17'; Keegan Daniel 36'; Lwazi Mvovo 44'; Con: Patrick Lambie 18', 37' (2/3); Pen: Patrick Lambie 13', 26' (2/3)		Try: Gio Aplon (2) 52', 72'; Con: Peter Grant 53', 73' (2/2); Pen: Peter Grant 9', 16' (2/2)	Attendance: 27,355; Referee: Jaco Peyper

Bye/s: Crusaders

=== Round 15 ===
1 June 2012	Crusaders	51–18	Highlanders	AMI Stadium (Addington), Christchurch
19:35	Try: George Whitelock 3'; Zac Guildford (2) 29', 35'; Ryan Crotty 37'; Richie McCaw 46'; Wyatt Crockett 57'; Matt Todd 71'; Con: Dan Carter 4', 36', 38', 58', 72' (5/7); Pen: Dan Carter 8', 27' (2/3); Cards: George Whitelock (yellow card) 17'	Scoreboard	Try: Tamati Ellison 20'; Hosea Gear 60'; Con: Chris Noakes 21' (1/1); Mike Delany (0/1); Pen: Chris Noakes 12', 18' (2/2); Cards: James Haskell (yellow card) 26'	Attendance: 21,000; Referee: Steve Walsh

1 June 2012	Rebels	19–27	Brumbies	AAMI Park, Melbourne
19:40	Try: Cooper Vuna 54'; Con: Julian Huxley 55' (1/1); Pen: Julian Huxley 18', 31', 36', 40' (4/4); Cards: Jono Owen (yellow card) 24'	Scoreboard	Try: Andrew Smith 25'; Robbie Coleman 52'; Con: Zack Holmes 53' (1/2); Pen: Jesse Mogg 2', 6' (2/2); Zack Holmes 14', 44', 72' (3/3)	Attendance: 12,422; Referee: Keith Brown

2 June 2012	Blues	34–41	Chiefs	North Harbour Stadium, Albany
19:35	Try: Francis Saili 13'; Lachie Munro 39'; Rudi Wulf 62'; Rene Ranger 65'; Con: Lachie Munro 14', 40', 63', 66' (4/4); Pen: Lachie Munro 29', 37' (2/2); Cards: Steven Luatua (yellow card) 34'	Scoreboard	Try: Asaeli Tikoirotuma (4) 15', 45', 55', 70'; Sonny Bill Williams 31'; Con: Aaron Cruden 16', 32', 46', 56', 71' (5/5); Pen: Aaron Cruden 4', 27' (2/3); Cards: Maritino Nemani (yellow card) 33'; Michael Fitzgerald (yellow card) 59'	Attendance: 20,200; Referee: Chris Pollock

2 June 2012	Waratahs	12–33	Hurricanes	Allianz Stadium, Sydney
19:40	Pen: Berrick Barnes 11', 24', 31', 44' (4/4)	Scoreboard	Try: Julian Savea 33'; Motu Matu'u 63'; Conrad Smith 70'; Chris Eaton 80'; Con: Beauden Barrett 34', 71' (2/4); Pen: Beauden Barrett 7', 17', 55' (3/3)	Attendance: 13,372; Referee: Bryce Lawrence

2 June 2012	Lions	38–28	Sharks	Coca-Cola Park, Johannesburg
17:05	Try: Grant Hattingh 4'; Derick Minnie 8'; Lionel Mapoe 25'; Deon van Rensburg 39'; Con: Elton Jantjies 5', 9', 26' (3/4); Pen: Elton Jantjies 19', 31', 49', 56' (4/4); Cards: Lionel Mapoe (yellow card) 34'		Try: Lwazi Mvovo 35'; JP Pietersen 43'; Odwa Ndungane 45'; Con: Patrick Lambie 44', 46' (2/3); Pen: Patrick Lambie 2', 21', 51' (3/3); Cards: Steven Sykes (yellow card) 29'	Attendance: 40,274; Referee: Garratt Williamson

2 June 2012	Bulls	14–19	Stormers	Loftus Versfeld, Pretoria
19:10	Try: Pierre Spies 29'; Con: Morné Steyn (0/1); Pen: Morné Steyn 14', 33', 44' (3/3); Drop: Morné Steyn (0/2)		Try: Bryan Habana 72'; Con: Peter Grant 73' (1/1); Pen: Peter Grant 10', 22', 37', 66' (4/4)	Attendance: 50,000; Referee: Jonathan Kaplan

Bye/s: Cheetahs, Force, Reds

=== Round 16 ===
29 June 2012	Highlanders	21–27	Chiefs	Forsyth Barr Stadium, Dunedin
19:35	Try: Andrew Hore 46'; Hosea Gear 75'; Con: Chris Noakes (0/1); Mike Delany 76' (1/1); Pen: Chris Noakes 8', 19', 30' (3/5)	Scoreboard	Try: Tim Nanai-Williams 2'; Robbie Robinson 38'; Con: Aaron Cruden 3' (1/2); Pen: Aaron Cruden 12', 40', 41', 64', 68' (5/6)	Attendance: 17,401; Referee: Garratt Williamson

29 June 2012	Rebels	17–32	Reds	AAMI Park, Melbourne
19:40	Try: Kurtley Beale 56'; Lachlan Mitchell 66'; Con: Julian Huxley 57' (1/1); Kurtley Beale 67' (1/1); Pen: James O'Connor 14' (1/1)	Report	Try: Chris Feauai-Sautia 16'; Dom Shipperley 26'; Adam Wallace-Harrison 35'; Nick Frisby 74'; Con: Mike Harris 17', 27', 36' (3/4); Pen: Mike Harris 20', 50' (2/2)	Attendance: 14,110; Referee: Keith Brown

30 June 2012	Crusaders	22–23	Hurricanes	AMI Stadium (Addington), Christchurch
19:35	Try: Zac Guildford 36'; Con: Tom Taylor 37' (1/1); Pen: Tom Taylor 8', 11', 28', 42', 53' (5/8); Tyler Bleyendaal (0/1)	Scoreboard	Try: Conrad Smith (2) 17', 39'; Con: Beauden Barrett 18', 40' (2/2); Pen: Beauden Barrett 14', 66', 74' (3/3)	Attendance: 17,500; Referee: Bryce Lawrence

30 June 2012	Force	17–28	Brumbies	{{{s}}}, [[{{{slan}}}]]
17:40	Try: Nick Cummins (2) 43', 50'; Toby Lynn 70'; Con: Ben Seymour (0/2); David Harvey 71' (1/1)	Scoreboard	Try: Jesse Mogg 2'; Ben Alexander 11'; Henry Speight 29'; Zack Holmes 38'; Con: Zack Holmes 12' (1/4); Pen: Zack Holmes 56', 73' (2/3)	Attendance: 13,571; Referee: Ian Smith

30 June 2012	Stormers	27–17	Lions	DHL Newlands, Cape Town
17:05	Try: Gio Aplon 30'; Jebb Sinclair 71'; Gerhard van den Heever 76'; Con: Peter Grant 31', 72', 77' (3/3); Pen: Peter Grant 3', 27' (2/2)	Scoreboard	Try: Josh Strauss 48'; Franco van der Merwe 79'; Con: Elton Jantjies 49', 80' (2/2); Pen: Elton Jantjies 24' (1/2)	Attendance: 44,587; Referee: Mark Lawrence

30 June 2012	Bulls	40–24	Cheetahs	Loftus Versfeld, Pretoria
19:10	Try: Pierre Spies 18'; Dean Greyling 22'; Zane Kirchner 28'; Francois Hougaard 36'; Werner Kruger 55'; Bjorn Basson 58'; Con: Morné Steyn 19', 23', 37', 56', 59' (5/6); Drop: Morné Steyn (0/1)		Try: W. P. Nel (2) 60', 68'; Willie le Roux 63'; Heinrich Brüssow 78'; Con: Sias Ebersohn 61', 69' (2/3); Nico Scheepers (0/1)	Attendance: 29,897; Referee: Marius Jonker

Bye/s: Blues, Sharks, Waratahs

=== Round 17 ===
6 July 2012	Chiefs	21–28	Crusaders	Waikato Stadium, Hamilton
19:35	Try: Brodie Retallick 30'; Sonny Bill Williams 55'; Con: Aaron Cruden 31' (1/2); Pen: Aaron Cruden 3', 16', 37' (3/4)	Scoreboard	Try: Kieran Read 10'; Luke Romano 21'; Andy Ellis 52'; Con: Dan Carter 11', 22' (2/3); Pen: Dan Carter 7', 61' (2/3); Drop: Dan Carter 17' (1/1)	Attendance: 25,100; Referee: Steve Walsh

6 July 2012	Reds	19–13	Highlanders	Suncorp Stadium, Brisbane
19:40	Try: James Slipper 57'; Con: Mike Harris 58' (1/1); Pen: Mike Harris 10', 31', 47', 70' (4/5); Drop: Mike Harris (0/1)	Scoreboard	Try: Adam Thomson 63'; Chris King 74'; Con: Mike Delany (0/1); Chris Noakes (0/1); Pen: Mike Delany 7' (1/2)	Attendance: 33,899; Referee: Jonathan Kaplan

6 July 2012	Sharks	32–10	Bulls	Mr Price Kings Park, Durban
19:10	Try: Bismarck du Plessis 12'; JP Pietersen 25'; Keegan Daniel 44'; Louis Ludik 78'; Con: Frédéric Michalak 13', 26' (2/3); Meyer Bosman 79' (1/1); Pen: Frédéric Michalak 32' (1/2); François Steyn 18' (1/2)	Scoreboard	Try: Zane Kirchner 51'; Con: Morné Steyn 52' (1/1); Pen: Morné Steyn 16' (1/1)	Attendance: 29,515; Referee: Jaco Peyper

7 July 2012	Blues	32–9	Force	Eden Park, Auckland
19:35	Try: Steven Luatua 29'; Charles Piutau 55'; Ma'a Nonu 58'; Luke Braid 71'; Con: Lachie Munro 30', 57', 59' (3/4); Pen: Lachie Munro 7', 40' (2/3)	Report	Pen: Ben Seymour 5', 23', 38' (3/3)	Attendance: 10,200; Referee: Andrew Lees

7 July 2012	Waratahs	15–19	Brumbies	ANZ Stadium, Sydney
19:40	Try: Tatafu Polota-Nau 31'; Berrick Barnes 57'; Con: Berrick Barnes 58' (1/2); Pen: Berrick Barnes 50' (1/1)	Scoreboard	Try: Henry Speight 62'; Con: Zack Holmes 62' (1/1); Pen: Zack Holmes 13', 40' (2/3); Jesse Mogg 24', 65' (2/3)	Attendance: 22,844; Referee: Keith Brown

7 July 2012	Cheetahs	6–13	Stormers	Free State Stadium, Bloemfontein
15:00	Pen: Riaan Smit 38', 53' (2/4); Drop: Riaan Smit (0/1); Cards: Willie le Roux (yellow card) 45'	Scoreboard	Try: Gio Aplon 53'; Con: Peter Grant 54' (1/1); Pen: Peter Grant 17', 47' (2/2)	Attendance: 20,721; Referee: Marius Jonker

7 July 2012	Lions	37–32	Rebels	Coca-Cola Park, Johannesburg
17:05	Try: Waylon Murray 2'; Derick Minnie (2) 10', 35'; Jaco Kriel 73'; Con: Elton Jantjies 3', 11', 36', 74' (4/4); Pen: Elton Jantjies 17', 62', 80+1' (3/3)	Scoreboard	Try: Ged Robinson 40'; Hugh Pyle (2) 47', 50'; James Hilgendorf 64'; Con: Julian Huxley 40', 48', 65' (3/4); Pen: Julian Huxley 59', 71' (2/2)	Attendance: 16,283; Referee: Francisco Pastrana

Bye/s: Hurricanes

=== Round 18 ===
13 July 2012	Hurricanes	28–25	Chiefs	Westpac Stadium, Wellington
19:35	Try: Julian Savea (2) 12', 24'; Dane Coles 80+5'; Con: Beauden Barrett 25', 80+6' (2/3); Pen: Beauden Barrett 7', 40', 62' (3/6); Cards: Ben May (yellow card) 28'	Scoreboard	Try: Tawera Kerr-Barlow 3'; Ben Tameifuna 38'; Aaron Cruden 57'; Con: Aaron Cruden 4', 58' (2/3); Pen: Aaron Cruden 32', 66' (2/4)	Attendance: 23,549; Referee: Jonathan Kaplan

14 July 2012	Brumbies	16–30	Blues	Canberra Stadium, Canberra
15:30	Try: Henry Speight 23'; Con: Zack Holmes 24' (1/1); Pen: Zack Holmes 20', 28' (2/3); Jesse Mogg 46' (1/4)	Scoreboard	Try: Liaki Moli 11'; Daniel Braid 16'; Hadleigh Parkes 36'; Con: Piri Weepu 12', 17', 37' (3/3); Pen: Piri Weepu 48', 51' (2/3); Michael Hobbs 78' (1/1)	Attendance: 14,111; Referee: Jonathon White

14 July 2012	Crusaders	38–24	Force	AMI Stadium (Addington), Christchurch
19:35	Try: Israel Dagg 1'; Sean Maitland 15'; Andy Ellis 34'; Matt Todd 37'; Con: Dan Carter 2', 35', 38' (3/4); Pen: Dan Carter 31', 40' (2/2); Tom Taylor 50', 64' (2/2); Cards: George Whitelock (yellow card) 74'	Scoreboard	Try: Kyle Godwin 53'; Alfie Mafi 60'; Josh Holmes 77'; Con: Brett Sheehan 54', 61' (2/2); Kyle Godwin 78' (1/1); Pen: Ben Seymour 28' (1/1)	Attendance: 13,600; Referee: Glen Jackson

14 July 2012	Reds	32–16	Waratahs	Suncorp Stadium, Brisbane
19:40	Try: Scott Higginbotham 3'; Liam Gill 24'; James Slipper 44'; Dom Shipperley 50'; Will Genia 58'; Con: Mike Harris 4', 51' (2/5); Pen: Mike Harris 77' (1/1)	Scoreboard	Try: Drew Mitchell 27'; Tom Carter 72'; Con: Bernard Foley (0/1); Brendan McKibbin (0/1); Pen: Bernard Foley 6' (1/1); Drop: Adam Ashley-Cooper 34' (1/1); Cards: Paddy Ryan (yellow card) 23'	Attendance: 41,533; Referee: Steve Walsh

14 July 2012	Stormers	26–21	Rebels	DHL Newlands, Cape Town
15:00	Try: Juan de Jongh (2) 14', 57'; Con: Peter Grant 15', 58' (2/2); Pen: Peter Grant 3', 8', 40', 75' (4/4)	Scoreboard	Try: Rodney Blake 50'; Nick Phipps 54'; Cooper Vuna 70'; Con: Julian Huxley 51', 55', 71' (3/3)	Attendance: 34,387; Referee: Lourens van der Merwe

14 July 2012	Sharks	34–15	Cheetahs	Mr Price Kings Park, Durban
17:05	Try: Keegan Daniel 44'; Charl McLeod 58'; Marcell Coetzee 61'; Ryan Kankowski 74'; Con: Frédéric Michalak 45', 59', 62', 75' (4/4); Pen: Frédéric Michalak 14', 31' (2/3); François Steyn (0/1); Drop: Frédéric Michalak (0/1); Cards: François Steyn (yellow card) 18'	Scoreboard	Pen: Riaan Smit 16', 19', 24', 34', 40' (5/5)	Attendance: 24,065; Referee: Jaco Peyper

14 July 2012	Bulls	37–20	Lions	Loftus Versfeld, Pretoria
19:10	Try: Akona Ndungane 16'; Bjorn Basson 31'; Francois Hougaard 44'; Jacques Potgieter 48'; Con: Morné Steyn 17', 32', 45', 49' (4/4); Pen: Morné Steyn 14', 38', 65' (3/5); Cards: Dean Greyling (yellow card) 79'	Scoreboard	Try: Michael Bondesio 36'; Josh Strauss 40'; Con: Elton Jantjies 37', 40' (2/2); Pen: Elton Jantjies 4', 24' (2/2)	Attendance: 24,652; Referee: Craig Joubert

Bye/s: Highlanders

== Finals ==
First round
21 July 2012
4	(New Zealand) Crusaders	28
5	(South Africa) Bulls	13
21 July 2012
3	(Australia) Reds	17
6	(South Africa) Sharks	30

Semifinals
27 July 2012
2	(New Zealand) Chiefs	20
4	(New Zealand) Crusaders	17
28 July 2012
1	(South Africa) Stormers	19
6	(South Africa) Sharks	26

Final
4 August 2012
(New Zealand) Chiefs	37
(South Africa) Sharks	6

=== Qualifiers ===
21 July 2012	Crusaders	28–13	Bulls	AMI Stadium (Addington), Christchurch
19:35	Try: Zac Guildford 26'; Con: Dan Carter 27' (1/1); Pen: Dan Carter 7', 11', 48', 52', 71', 80' (6/8); Drop: Dan Carter 34' (1/1); Sean Maitland (0/1)	Scoreboard	Try: Dewald Potgieter 63'; Wynand Olivier 78'; Con: Morné Steyn (0/1); Louis Fouché (0/1); Pen: Morné Steyn 38' (1/1)	Attendance: 16,000; Referee: Jaco Peyper

21 July 2012	Reds	17–30	Sharks	Suncorp Stadium, Brisbane
19:40	Try: Will Genia 37'; Radike Samo 80+1'; Con: Mike Harris 38' (1/1); Will Genia 80+2' (1/1); Pen: Mike Harris 28' (1/2)		Try: JP Pietersen 11'; Paul Jordaan 23'; Charl McLeod 43'; Con: Frédéric Michalak 12', 24', 44' (3/3); Pen: Frédéric Michalak 10', 77' (2/2); Drop: Frédéric Michalak 30' (1/1); Cards: Steven Sykes (yellow card) 80'	Attendance: 36,571; Referee: Jonathan Kaplan

=== Semi-finals ===
27 July 2012	Chiefs	20–17	Crusaders	Waikato Stadium, Hamilton
19:35	Try: Sona Taumalolo 26'; Liam Messam 33'; Con: Aaron Cruden 27', 35' (2/2); Pen: Aaron Cruden 3', 50' (2/5)	Scoreboard	Try: Ryan Crotty 40'; Con: Dan Carter (0/1); Pen: Dan Carter 15', 32', 45', 62' (4/5)	Attendance: 25,100; Referee: Craig Joubert

28 July 2012	Stormers	19–26	Sharks	Newlands Stadium, Cape Town
17:05	Try: Gio Aplon 67'; Con: Peter Grant 68' (1/1); Pen: Peter Grant 7', 40', 57', 72' (4/5)	Scoreboard	Try: Louis Ludik 35'; JP Pietersen 59'; Con: Frédéric Michalak 36', 60' (2/2); Pen: Frédéric Michalak 13', 45' (2/2); Riaan Viljoen (0/1); Drop: Frédéric Michalak 19', 75' (2/4)	Attendance: 48,000; Referee: Steve Walsh

=== Final ===
4 August 2012	Chiefs	37–6	Sharks	Waikato Stadium, Hamilton
19:35	Try: Tim Nanai-Williams 19'; Kane Thompson 46'; Lelia Masaga 61'; Sonny Bill Williams 77'; Con: Aaron Cruden 20', 47', 62', 78' (4/4); Pen: Aaron Cruden 25', 34', 72' (3/5)	Scoreboard	Pen: Frédéric Michalak 6', 52' (2/2)	Attendance: 25,100; Referee: Steve Walsh

== Players ==
=== Leading try scorers ===
Top 10 try scorers
Pos	Name	Team	Tries
1	Bjorn Basson	Bulls	10
1	Andre Taylor	Hurricanes	10
3	Julian Savea	Hurricanes	9
3	Sona Taumalolo	Chiefs	9
5	Gio Aplon	Stormers	8
5	Zac Guildford	Crusaders	8
5	Lwazi Mvovo	Sharks	8
5	Dom Shipperley	Reds	8
5	Henry Speight	Brumbies	8
10	Willie le Roux	Cheetahs	7
10	TJ Perenara	Hurricanes	7
10	Conrad Smith	Hurricanes	7
10	Asaeli Tikoirotuma	Chiefs	7
10	Cooper Vuna	Rebels	7

Source: South African Rugby Union

=== Leading point scorers ===
Top 10 overall point scorers
Pos	Name	Team	Points
1	Aaron Cruden	Chiefs	251
2	Morné Steyn	Bulls	228
3	Beauden Barrett	Hurricanes	197
4	Mike Harris	Reds	149
5	Tom Taylor	Crusaders	146
6	Johan Goosen	Cheetahs	145
7	Peter Grant	Stormers	144
8	Patrick Lambie	Sharks	141
9	Elton Jantjies	Lions	126
10	Christian Lealiifano	Brumbies	109

Source: South African Rugby Union

== Referees ==
The following refereeing panel was appointed by SANZAR for the 2012 Super Rugby season:

== Attendances ==
Team	Main stadium	Capacity	Total attendance	Average attendance	% capacity
(New Zealand) Blues	Eden Park	50,000	139,962	17,495	37%
(New Zealand) Chiefs	Waikato Stadium	25,800	176,337	17,633	74%
(New Zealand) Hurricanes	Westpac Stadium	34,500	114,881	14,360	43%
(New Zealand) Crusaders	Rugby League Park	18,000	150,400	16,711	91%
(New Zealand) Highlanders	Forsyth Barr Stadium	30,728	133,242	16,655	57%
(Australia) Reds	Suncorp Stadium	52,500	310,316	34,479	65%
(Australia) Brumbies	Canberra Stadium	25,011	115,352	14,419	57%
(Australia) Waratahs	Sydney Football Stadium	44,000	167,494	20,936	47%
(Australia) Melbourne Rebels	AAMI Park	29,500	111,338	13,917	47%
(Australia) Force	nib Stadium	20,500	106,041	13,255	64%
(South Africa) Sharks	ABSA Stadium	52,000	194,165	24,270	46%
(South Africa) Bulls	Loftus Versfeld	51,792	268,497	33,562	64%
(South Africa) Lions	Ellis Park	62,567	186,533	23,316	37%
(South Africa) Cheetahs	Free State Stadium	46,000	153,950	19,243	41%
(South Africa) Stormers	Newlands Stadium	51,900	383,348	42,594	82%

== Notes ==
- Australian crowd figures taken from SMH match reports.
