= Zack Holmes =

Australian rugby union player

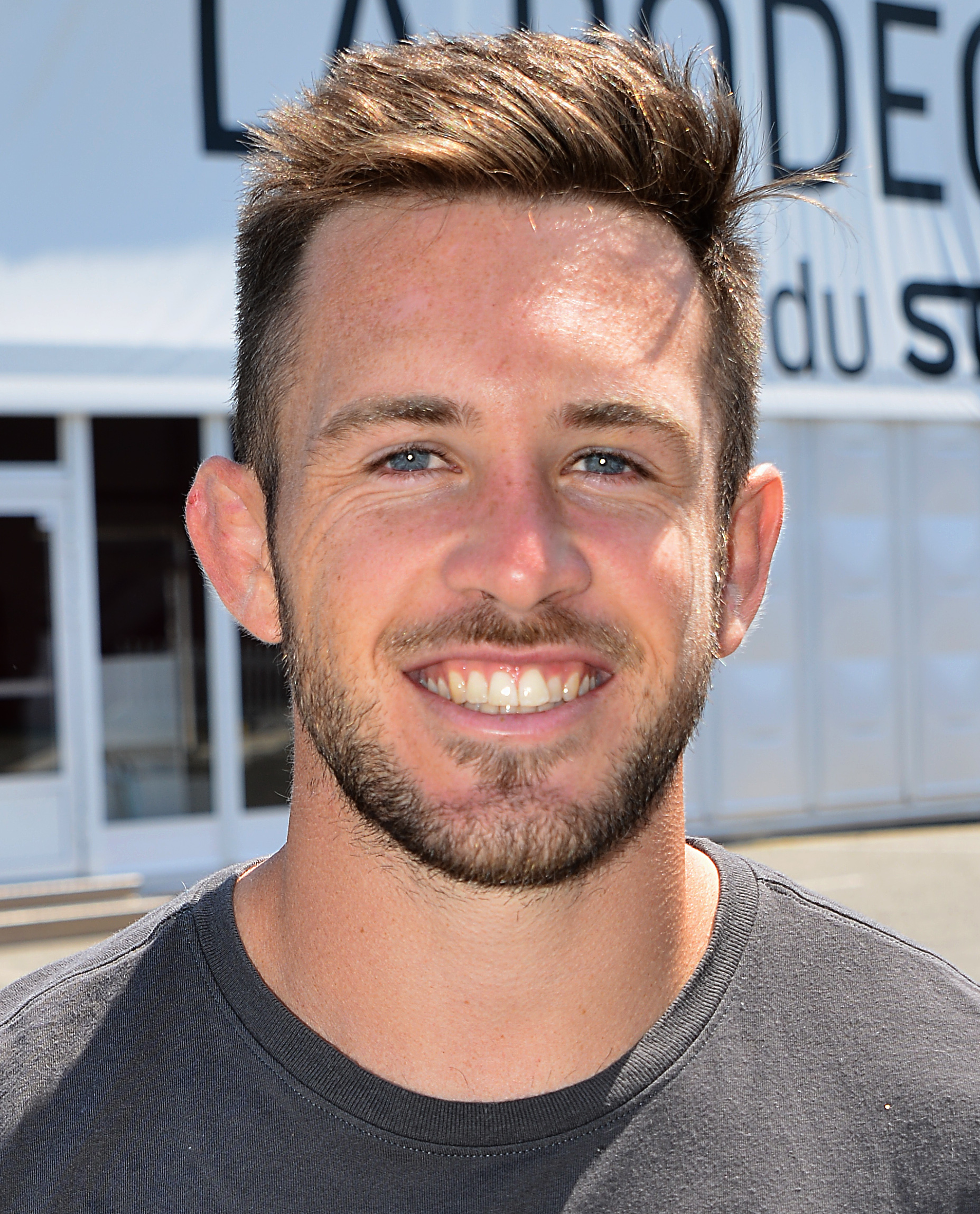
- Born: Zack Holmes; 30 May 1990 (age 36) Perth, Western Australia, Australia
- Height: 1.75 m (5 ft 9 in)
- Weight: 90 kg (14 st 2 lb)

Rugby union career
- Position: Fly-half/Centre
Amateur team(s)
Years	Team	Apps	(Points)
- Associates (WA)
Senior career
Years	Team	Apps	(Points)
2014	Perth Spirit	10	(80)
2015−2017	La Rochelle	49	(410)
2017–2022	Toulouse	111	(441)
2022-	Bordeaux Bègles	19	(89)
- Correct as of 4 March 2023
Super Rugby
Years	Team	Apps	(Points)
2012–13	Brumbies	10	(79)
2014–15	Western Force	23	(30)
- Correct as of 6 September 2021

Zack Holmes (born 30 May 1990) is an Australian rugby union player who plays for Toulouse in Top 14. He is a utility back who has played fly-half and at centre.

== Early career ==
The ARU lists Holmes' Representative Honours as including WA Schools (2007) and Combined States (2007). He played for the Australian Sevens at the USA Sevens tournament in Las Vegas, and he was a member the Australian 2009–10 IRB Sevens squad that played in George and Dubai.

Holmes grew up in Perth. His father Graeme, a New Zealander and former Waikato halfback, encouraged his son in sports. In addition to rugby union Holmes also played Australian rules and soccer. He said his three biggest rugby influences were his Dad, Michael O'Connor and Scott Fava.

In 2003 he held the national title for the 400 metres in his age-group.

In late 2010 he was selected as part of the Perth XV to play teams from Victoria and South Australia in the Southern State Championships.

Holmes studied at Aquinas College and the University of WA and played club rugby at Associates RUFC before he moved from Perth to Sydney where he played senior rugby for Northern Suburbs at centre, on the wing, and also at full back. In 2011 Holmes broke the Norths record for the 'most points in a single season'.

== Professional career ==
Holmes joined the Western Force academy in 2009.

In 2011 the Brumbies recruited Holmes as a 'utility back', and he performed well in a trial game in October. He had been at Norths, in Sydney. Holmes had signed a two-year contract with the Brumbies to commence 2012. He made his debut in March, as substitute for wing Joseph Tomane, against the Chiefs at Baypark Stadium in Mount Maunganui.

As "rookie fly-half" he made his Brumbies run-on debut, in Wellington against the Hurricanes, in May. He had been selected as a No.10 replacement for the injured Christian Lealiifano. As first-receiver Holmes helped guide the Brumbies to a 37–25 victory over the Hurricanes. He kicked four conversions (from 4 attempts) and three penalty goals (from 4 attempts) and scored a try in the 69th minute.

He returned to the Force for the 2014 Super Rugby season on a two-year deal.

On 16 July 2015, Holmes left Western Force in Australia to join France Top 14 club La Rochelle on a two-year contract from the 2015–16 season. On 14 December 2016, Holmes signed for French rivals Toulouse from the 2017–18 season.

== Super Rugby statistics ==
As of 14 June 2015

Season	Team	Games	Starts	Sub	Mins	Tries	Cons	Pens	Drops	Points	Yel	Red
2012	Brumbies	8	6	2	518	2	8	16	0	74	0	0
2013	Brumbies	2	0	2	30	1	0	0	0	5	0	0
2014	Force	12	4	8	408	1	2	3	0	18	0	0
2015	Force	10	6	4	525	0	4	6	0	26	0	0
Total		32	16	16	1481	4	14	25	0	123	0	0
