= Jesse Mogg =

Australia international rugby union player

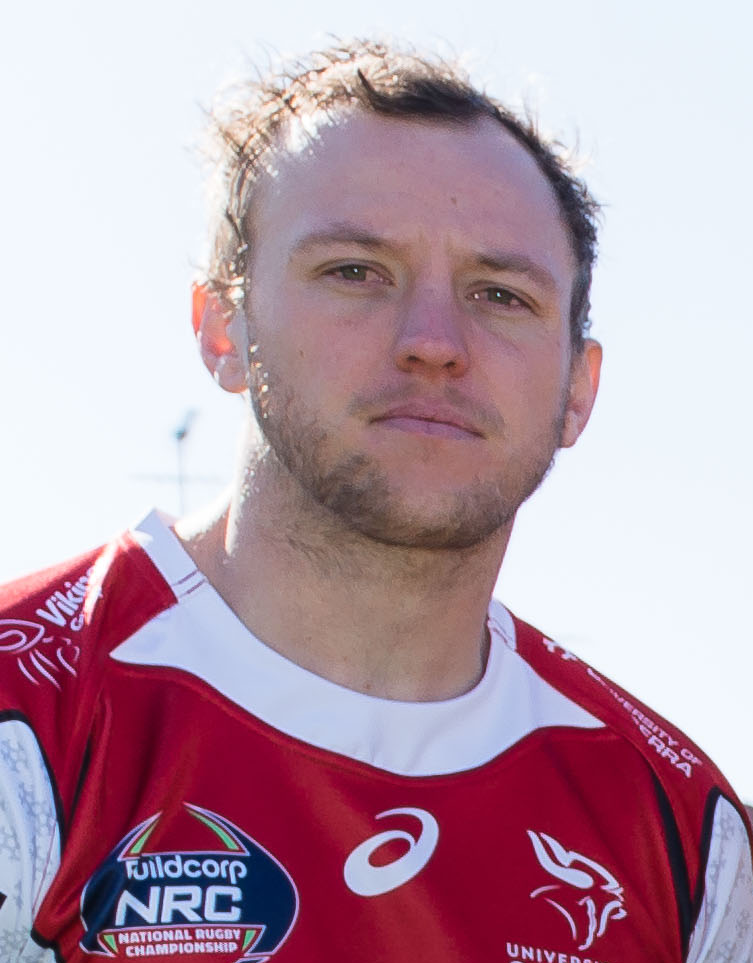
- Mogg in 2014
- Born: Jesse Mogg; 8 June 1989 (age 37) Brisbane, Australia
- Height: 1.87 m (6 ft 1 1/2 in)
- Weight: 90 kg (14 st 2 lb; 198 lb)

Rugby union career
- Position: Full-Back / Wing
Senior career
Years	Team	Apps	(Points)
2014	Canberra Vikings	6	(44)
2015−2018	Montpellier	60	(80)
2018−2021	Section Paloise	20	(13)
- Correct as of 13 June 2021
Super Rugby
Years	Team	Apps	(Points)
2012–2015, 2022-2023	Brumbies	69	(158)
- Correct as of 9 November 2023
International career
Years	Team	Apps	(Points)
2013	Australia	3	(0)
- Correct as of 13 June 2021

Jesse Mogg (born 8 June 1989) is an Australian rugby union player who plays for the French Top 14 club Montpellier. His usual position is at full-back, though he can also play as a winger. Mogg previously played four seasons with the Brumbies in Super Rugby. He was capped for the Australian national team in 2013.

== Family and early life ==
Mogg was born in Brisbane and attended St Patrick's College, Shorncliffe (the same school as notable Wallaby Drew Mitchell). In 2006 he represented the Australia A Schools rugby union side. He played colts rugby at the University of Queensland club. Mogg is distantly related to the former professional rugby league footballer, Adam Mogg.

== Rugby career ==
Mogg joined the North Brisbane Rugby Club in the Queensland Premier Rugby competition for two years, and was selected to play for Queensland A in 2008. He then switched codes to rugby league where he played in the Toyota Cup competition as a member of the Brisbane Broncos development squad in 2009.

Mogg joined the Brumbies rugby academy in 2011. Mogg made his professional rugby union debut for the Brumbies in the first round of the 2012 Super Rugby season against the Western Force in Canberra, scoring a try in a 19–17 victory. Mogg, a former high school track star, recorded a maximum speed of 10.06 metres per second during 2013 pre-season sprint testing with the Brumbies, making him one of the fastest players of any football code within Australia.

Mogg signed with French Top 14 club Montpellier for the 2015–16 season.

After six years playing in France, three with Monpellier before moving to Section Paloise, Mogg signed a two-year deal to return to the Brumbies for the 2022–23 seasons.

== Super Rugby statistics ==
As of 28 June 2015

Season	Team	Games	Starts	Sub	Mins	Tries	Cons	Pens	Drops	Points	Yel	Red
2012	Brumbies	16	16	0	1189	4	1	5	0	37	0	0
2013	Brumbies	16	16	0	1209	6	0	6	0	48	0	0
2014	Brumbies	18	17	1	1242	8	0	3	0	49	1	0
2015	Brumbies	10	9	1	699	1	0	2	0	11	1	0
Total		60	58	2	4339	19	1	16	0	145	2	0

== Honours ==
- 2015–16 European Rugby Challenge Cup : winner (Montpellier).
