= Gareth Anscombe =

Wales international rugby union player

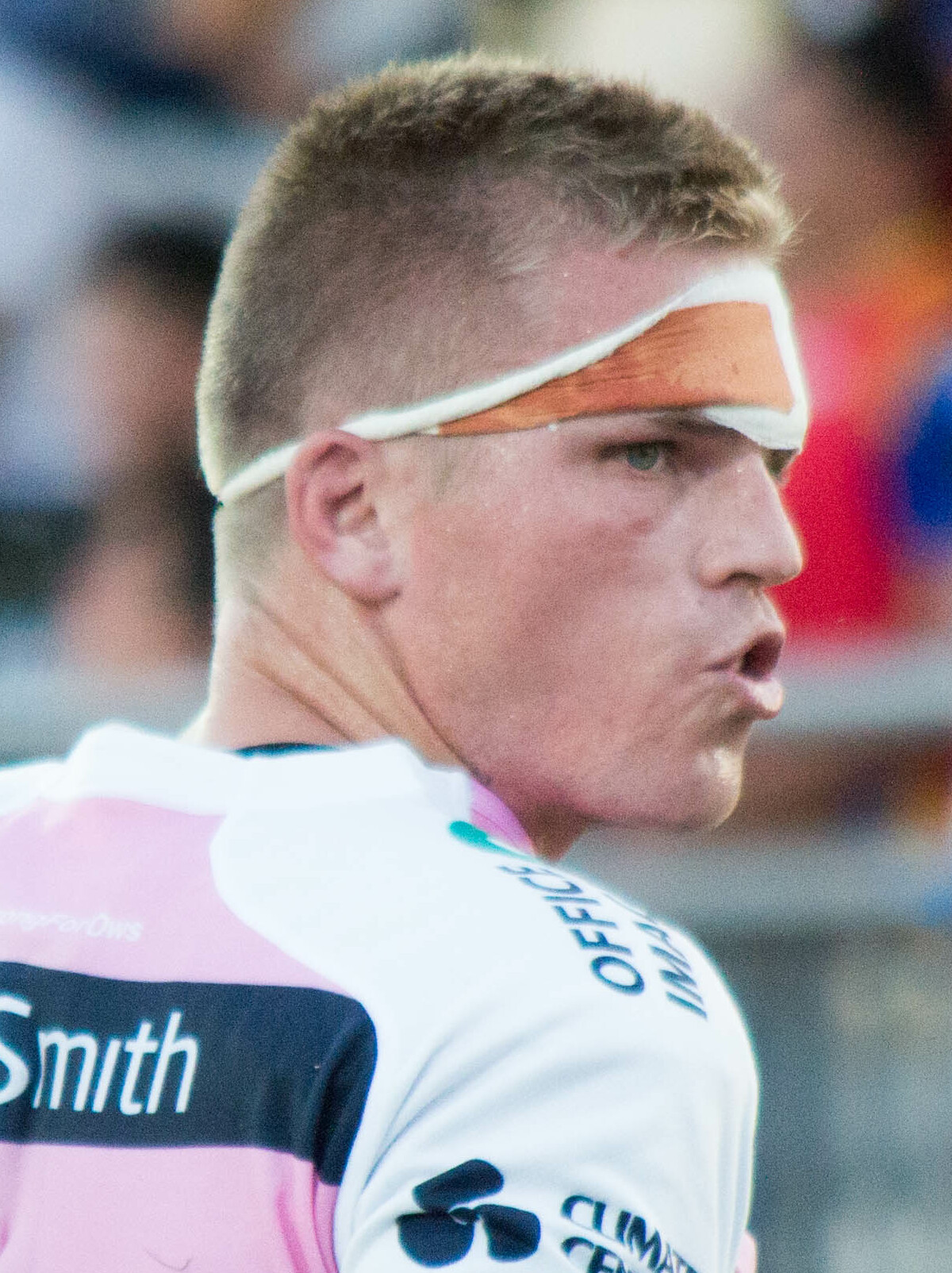
- Anscombe in 2016
- Born: Gareth William Anscombe; 10 May 1991 (age 35) Auckland, New Zealand
- Height: 183 cm (6 ft 0 in)
- Weight: 80 kg (12 st 8 lb; 176 lb)
- School: Rosmini College
- Notable relative: Mark Anscombe (father)

Rugby union career
- Position(s): Fly-half, Fullback
- Current team: Scarlets
Senior career
Years	Team	Apps	(Points)
2010–2014	Auckland	38	(572)
2012	Blues	10	(102)
2013–2014	Chiefs	26	(253)
2014–2019	Cardiff Blues	76	(615)
2019–2023	Ospreys	19	(142)
2023–2024	Suntory Sungoliath	0	(0)
2024–2025	Gloucester	17	(23)
2025–2026	Bayonne	6	(7)
2026–	Scarlets		
- Correct as of 13 August 2026
International career
Years	Team	Apps	(Points)
2011	New Zealand U20	5	(86)
2015–2025	Wales	37	(111)
- Correct as of 13 August 2026

Gareth Anscombe (born 10 May 1991) is a rugby union player who plays for United Rugby Championship side Scarlets and the Wales national rugby union team. He primarily plays at fly-half but can also play as a fullback. Anscombe is the son of former Auckland and Ulster coach Mark Anscombe.

== Early career ==
Anscombe debuted for Auckland in the 2010 season, in his first year out of school. In 2011, he was the top point scorer at the IRB Junior World Championship and retained his place in the Auckland squad.

== Club career ==
Anscombe made his debut for Auckland's Blues in 2012, coming on to replace Michael Hobbs in the round two match against the Chiefs in Hamilton. His starting debut was against the Bulls in round three, in which he scored all of the Blues points in a 29–23 win. Despite compelling form in the 2012 ITM Cup, where his pin-point accurate kicking helped Auckland to a finals appearance against eventual winners Canterbury, the Blues management seemed unmoved, and after John Kirwan took over the coaching of the Blues, Anscombe was delisted. It was announced that he would play for the Chiefs from the 2013 season. In 2013, he signed a contract extension with the Chiefs until 2014.

On 24 July 2014, Anscombe moved to the UK to sign for Welsh region Cardiff Blues on a long-term deal as he is Wales qualified through his mother. On 15 August 2019, Anscombe signed for regional rivals Ospreys after making the switch from Cardiff.

Anscombe left Ospreys at the end of the 2022-23 season as he moved to Japan to join Tokyo Sungoliath in the Top League competition for the 2023-24 season. However, his registration for the Japanese club was cancelled after suffering a groin injury which required surgery.

On 12 March 2024, Anscombe returned to the UK, signing for Gloucester in the English Premiership for the 2024-25 season.

On 7 May 2025, after a season in the Premiership, Anscombe would move to France to sign for Bayonne in the Top 14 for the 2025-26 season.

On July 28, 2026, after spending a season in France with Bayonne, it was announced that Anscombe would be returning to Wales to play for the Scarlets for the 2026-2027 URC Season.

== International career ==
=== New Zealand ===
Anscombe represented New Zealand at under-20 level; he started at first-five when New Zealand won the competition now known as the World Rugby Under 20 Championship in 2011. However, he was not tied to New Zealand at senior level; only an appearance for the All Blacks themselves, or the country's official second-level side, the Junior All Blacks, would have tied him to that country.

=== Wales ===
In April 2014, a report in Cardiff's Western Mail indicated that Wales head coach Warren Gatland was seriously considering fast-tracking Anscombe into that country's international set-up, and that the Cardiff Blues of Pro12 were set to offer him a contract starting with the 2014–15 Northern Hemisphere season. Anscombe qualifies for Wales through his Cardiff-born mother.

On 20 January 2015, Anscombe was named in the 34-man Wales squad for the 2015 Six Nations Championship. He made his full international debut for Wales versus Ireland on 8 August 2015 as a second-half replacement.

On 16 March 2019, Anscombe was named Guinness Man of the Match having scored 20 points in Wales's 25-7 Grand Slam-winning victory over Ireland at the Principality Stadium.
