= David Harvey (rugby union) =

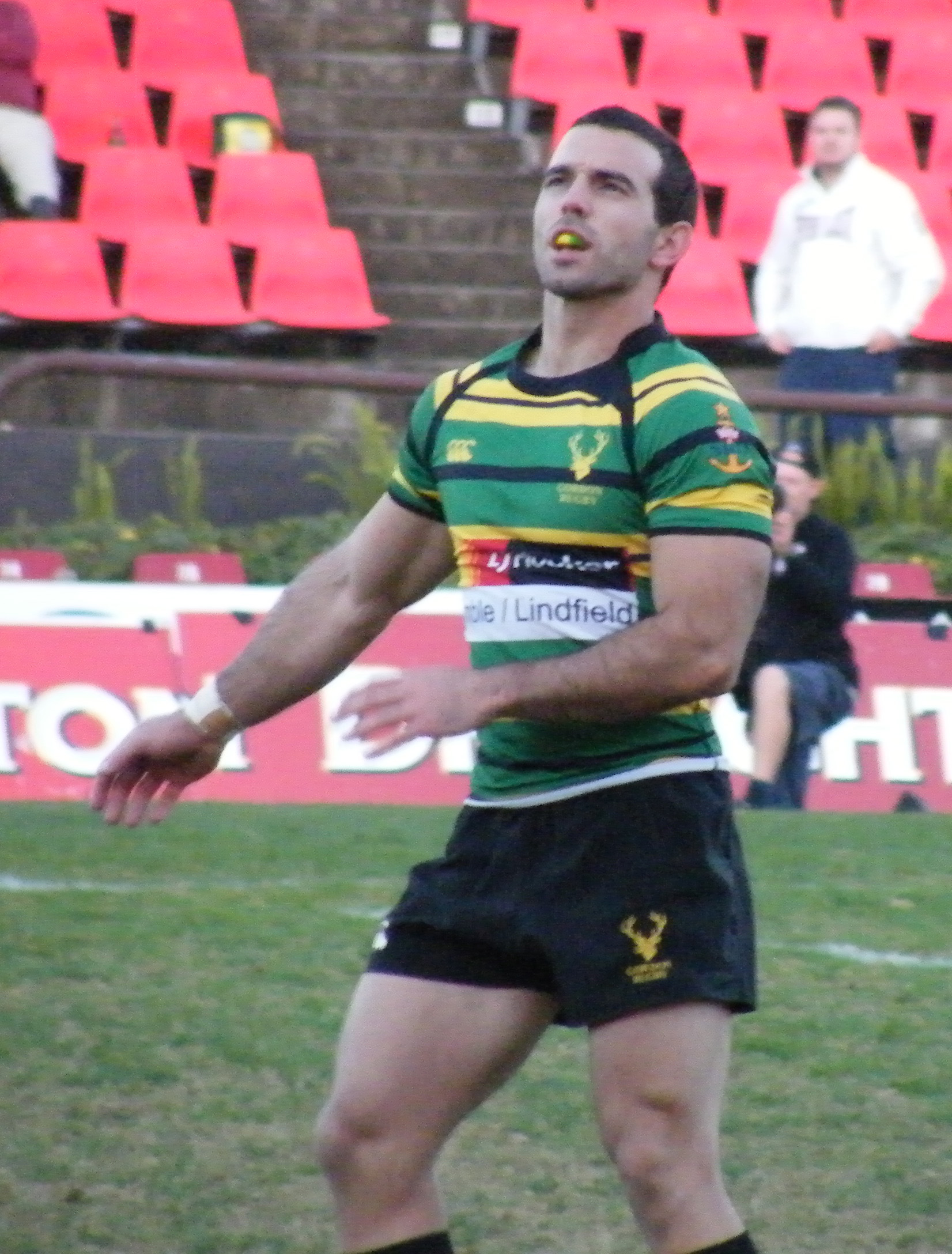
- Born: David Harvey; 20 May 1982 (age 44) Brisbane, Queensland, Australia
- Height: 1.76 m (5 ft 9 1/2 in)
- Weight: 86 kg (13 st 8 lb)

Rugby union career
- Position(s): Fly-half, fullback
Amateur team(s)
| Years | Team | Apps | (Points) |
- West Harbour
| 2004–2005 | Bradford & Bingley | 4 | (40) |
| – | Newbury | 25 | (332) |
| | Coventry | 17 | (50) |
| 2007 | Sydney Rays | 6 | (10) |
| 2009–2011 | Amatori Milano | | |
| 2011 | Narbonne | 7 | (65) |
| 2014 | Greater Sydney Rams | 1 | (0) |
| 2015– | NSW Country Eagles | 2 | (3) |
- Correct as of 4 November 2015
Super Rugby
| Years | Team | Apps | (Points) |
| 2012 | Force | 10 | (89) |
- Correct as of 20 July 2012
International career
| Years | Team | Apps | (Points) |
| 2015– | Brazil | 4 | (40) |

David Harvey (born 20 May 1982) is a Brazilian rugby player. He has played in the Super Rugby for the Western Force and for several clubs around the world in England, France, Italy and Australia.

== Rugby career ==
Harvey played for the Western Force in Super Rugby, making his debut for in round four of the 2012 season against the Waratahs in Sydney. Harvey previously played for French side Narbonne and English teams such as Coventry, Newbury and Bradford & Bingley.

== International career ==
Harvey, born in Australia, was eligible to represent Australia, both by birth and by residency grounds, and Brazil via his mother, who is Brazilian. In 2015, Harvey was selected to represent Brazil against Germany. Harvey scored twelve points in the match. Brazil lost 12–29.
