= Mike Harris (rugby union) =

Australia international rugby union player

Michael Harris
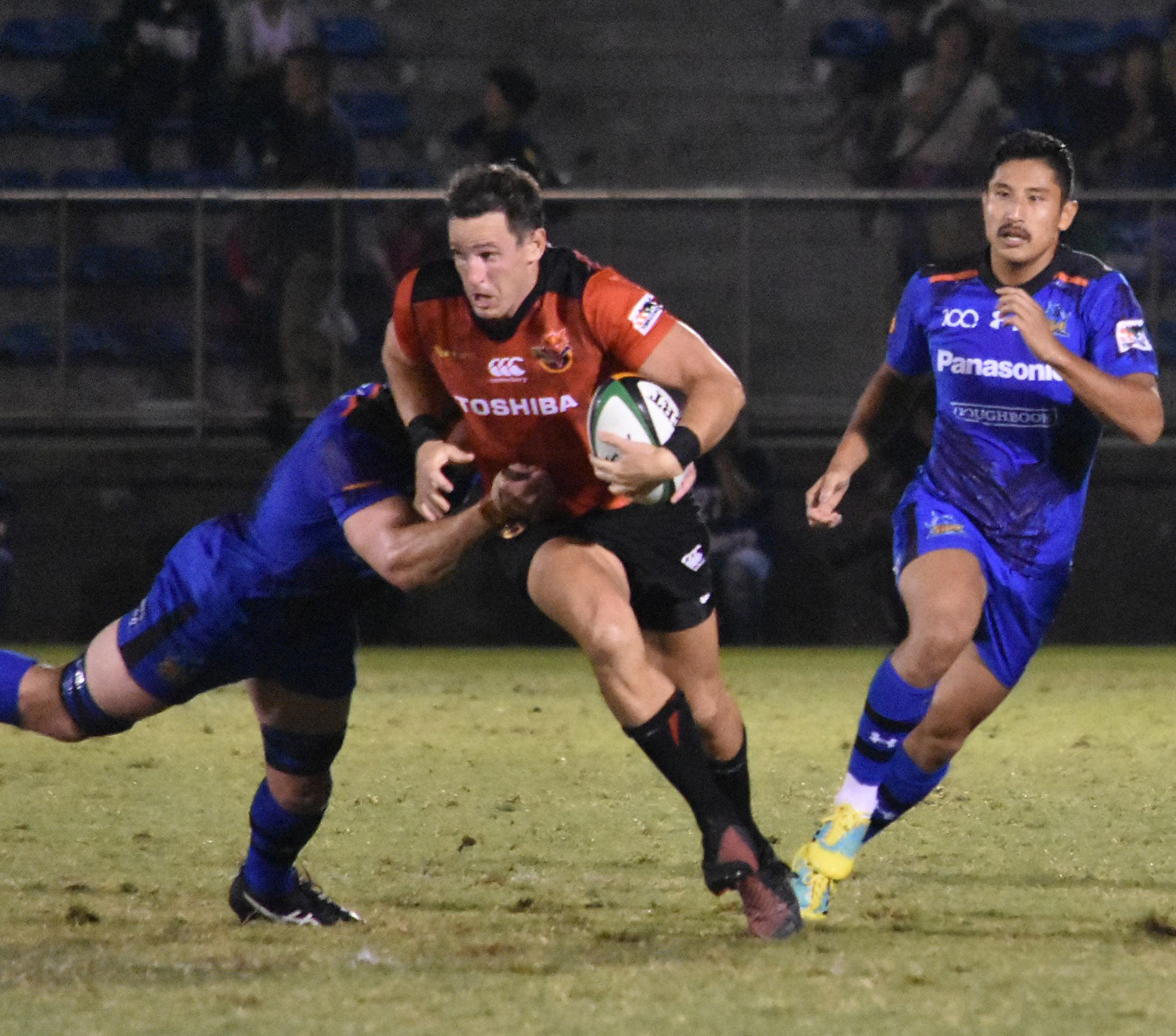
- Harris in 2018
- Born: 8 July 1988 (age 38) North Shore, New Zealand
- Height: 186 cm (6 ft 1 in)
- Weight: 96 kg (212 lb)
- School: Westlake Boys High School

Rugby union career
- Position: Inside Centre / Fly-half / Fullback
Senior career
Years	Team	Apps	(Points)
2016−2018	Lyon	45	(158)
2018–2020	Toshiba Brave Lupus	5	(30)
2020–2023	Pau	4	(3)
- Correct as of 25 April 2021
Provincial / State sides
Years	Team	Apps	(Points)
2007–2010	North Harbour	33	(255)
2014	Queensland Country	0	(0)
Super Rugby
Years	Team	Apps	(Points)
2011–2014	Reds	44	(268)
2015−2016	Rebels	22	(133)
- Correct as of 25 April 2021
International career
Years	Team	Apps	(Points)
2007-2008	New Zealand U20	1	(0)
2012	Australia	10	(55)
- Correct as of 25 April 2021

Michael Harris (born 8 July 1988) is a former professional rugby union football player who most recently played for Pau in the Top 14. He was also been capped ten times for Australia. Harris began his career in 2007 with North Harbour in New Zealand's ITM Cup before moving to Australia in 2011. He played for the Queensland Reds and Melbourne Rebels in Super Rugby and then joined French club Lyon for two seasons from late 2016. He moved to Japan for the 2018–19 season.

His main positions are at flyhalf or second five-eighth. He is also a reliable goal kicker. Mike was Head Boy at Westlake Boys High School in 2006.

== Club career ==
After making his Queensland Reds debut in 2011, Harris was selected to fill the void of flyhalf after fellow Queensland Reds played Quade Cooper had succumbed to injury during the 2011 Rugby World Cup. Harris immediately made an impact as he broke the Super Rugby record for most consecutive goals (penalties, conversions etc.) with 24. He also broke John Eales' Queensland and Australian record for most goals in a game with 9 (7 penalties, 2 conversions). He became a viable kicking option for the Reds but suffered injury a few weeks later. In June 2012 he was selected to play his first test match against Scotland. In May 2014, it was announced that Harris would be joining the Melbourne Rebels for the 2015 and 2016 seasons.

On 16 March 2016, Harris travels to France to join with top club Lyon in the Top 14 on a two-year deal from the 2016–17 season. On 4 April 2018, Harris leaves France for Japan to join Toshiba Brave Lupus, in the Top League on a two-year deal from the 2018–19 season.

On 2 July 2020, Harris returned to France with Top 14 rivals Pau on a two-year deal from the 2020-21 season, where he played until 2023.

== International career ==
Harris was qualified to represent the Wallabies through his Australian-born grandmother, and was selected at inside centre for the test match on 5 June 2012 against Scotland. He scored 6 points in this game, the only points for Australia in a 9–6 loss to Scotland. Two weeks later he was on the bench in the second test against Wales in Melbourne on 16 June 2012, coming on for an injured Berrick Barnes. He scored the winning goal for the match to secure a 25–23 win for the Wallabies.

After missing selection for the Wallabies at the 2015 World Cup, Harris was named in the 39-man squad for the 2016 international series against England.

== Super Rugby statistics ==
As of 21 July 2016

Season	Team	Games	Starts	Sub	Mins	Tries	Cons	Pens	Drops	Points	Yel	Red
2011	Reds	8	6	2	498	3	5	3	0	34	1	0
2012	Reds	14	14	0	1037	0	22	34	1	149	0	0
2013	Reds	8	4	4	339	0	3	4	0	18	0	0
2014	Reds	14	14	0	1050	3	12	9	1	69	0	0
2015	Rebels	15	15	0	1131	1	20	26	0	123	0	0
2016	Rebels	6	6	0	279	1	1	1	0	10	0	0
Total		66	60	6	4334	8	63	77	2	403	1	0
