= Tom Kingston (rugby union) =

Australian rugby union player

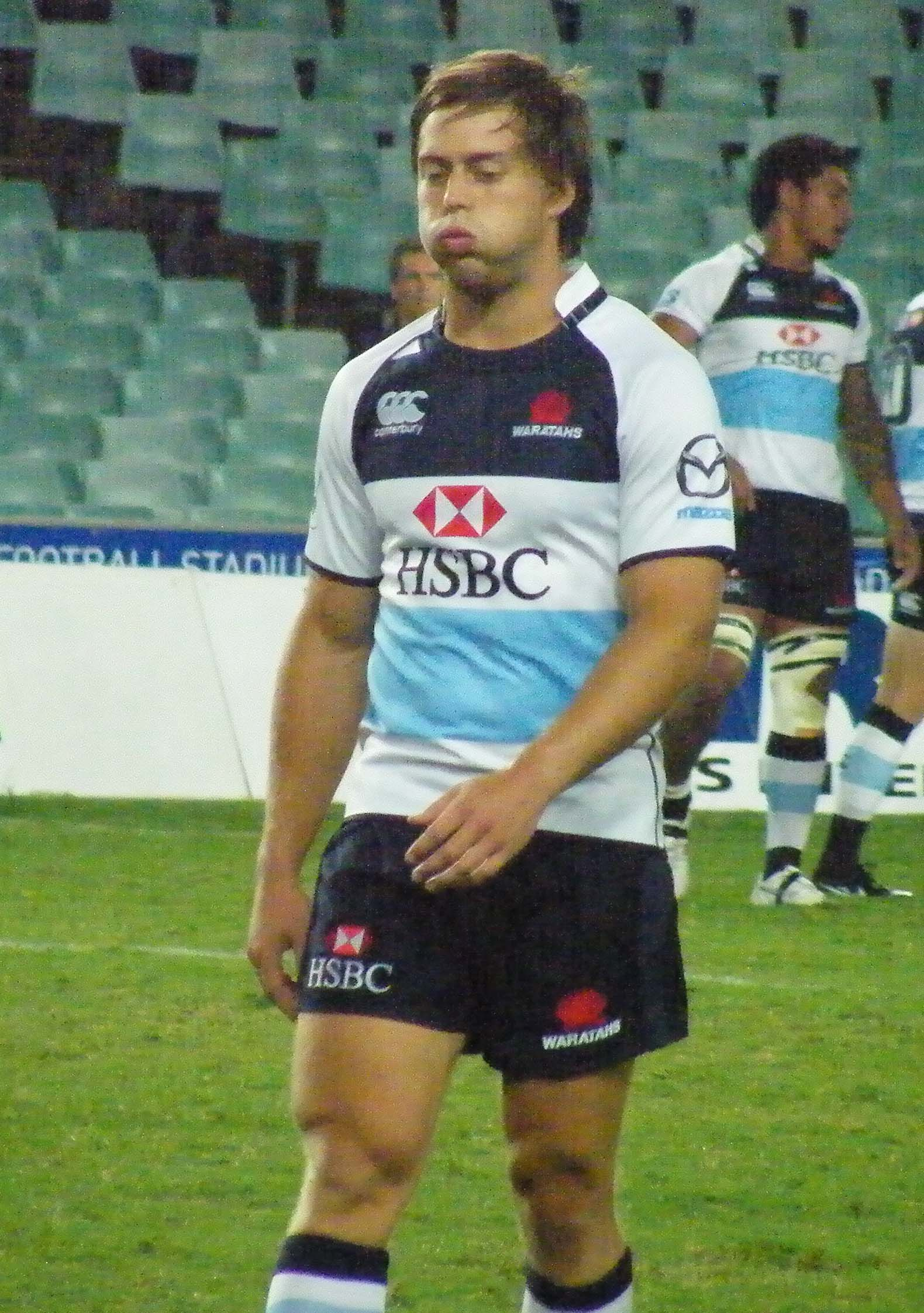
- Kingston in 2011
- Born: Thomas Kingston; 19 June 1991 (age 35) Sydney, New South Wales, Australia
- Height: 190 cm (6 ft 3 in)
- Weight: 91 kg (14 st 5 lb)
- School: St Aloysius' College
- University: Sydney University

Rugby union career
- Position(s): Outside centre winger
- Current team: Sydney University
Senior career
Years	Team	Apps	(Points)
2015–present	Sydney Stars	9	(5)
- Correct as of 3 November 2015
Super Rugby
Years	Team	Apps	(Points)
2011–13	Waratahs	29	(30)
2014–15	Rebels	12	(5)
- Correct as of 7 July 2015
International career
Years	Team	Apps	(Points)
2011	Australia U20	5	(10)
- Correct as of 10 June 2013

Tom Kingston (born 19 June 1991) is an Australian professional rugby footballer. His usual position is outside centre or wing. He signed on to play for the Melbourne Rebels in 2014.

== Early life ==
Kingston first started playing Rugby in Hong Kong and when his family returned to Australia he played junior rugby for the Mosman Whales before moving to play for the Manly Roos. He showed promise in his junior rugby career while at St Aloysius' College. His performances earned him selection in the Australian U16 Merit Side in 2007. Despite impressing selectors as a 17-year-old, Kingston missed out on playing for the Australian Schoolboys side in 2008, following a collarbone injury. He was selected in 2009 and earned four caps for his country.

== Rugby career ==
In 2011 he made his debut for the New South Wales Waratahs, and later that year was selected in the Australian Under 20s side to play in the 2011 IRB Junior World Championship in Italy. He was also selected for the Australian Sevens side in 2011, but had to forgo the opportunity to tour due to his commitments with the Waratahs.

Kingston became a regular for the Waratahs in 2012. On the back of strong performances, he was named in the media as a potential candidate for the Wallabies but did not gain selection. In late May 2013, he signed a two-year deal to join the Melbourne Rebels, starting in the 2014 Super Rugby season.

He competed at the 2016 Summer Olympics.

== Super Rugby statistics ==
As of 15 June 2015

Season	Team	Games	Starts	Sub	Mins	Tries	Cons	Pens	Drops	Points	Yel	Red
2011	Waratahs	4	2	2	176	1	0	0	0	5	0	0
2012	Waratahs	15	14	1	1097	4	0	0	0	20	0	0
2013	Waratahs	10	5	5	386	1	0	0	0	5	0	0
2014	Rebels	12	5	7	474	1	0	0	0	5	0	0
2015	Rebels	0	0	0	0	0	0	0	0	0	0	0
Total		41	26	15	2133	7	0	0	0	35	0	0

== Honours ==
Individual

- 2011 Young Waratah of the Year

== Smartest man in rugby ==
There was speculation Kingston might be the "smartest man in rugby" after he scored 104 out of 100 in his 2009 ATAR ranking – receiving a ranking of 99 based on his HSC marks, with five bonus additional points awarded due to his national representative achievements in rugby.
