= Samu Wara =

Australian rugby union & league player

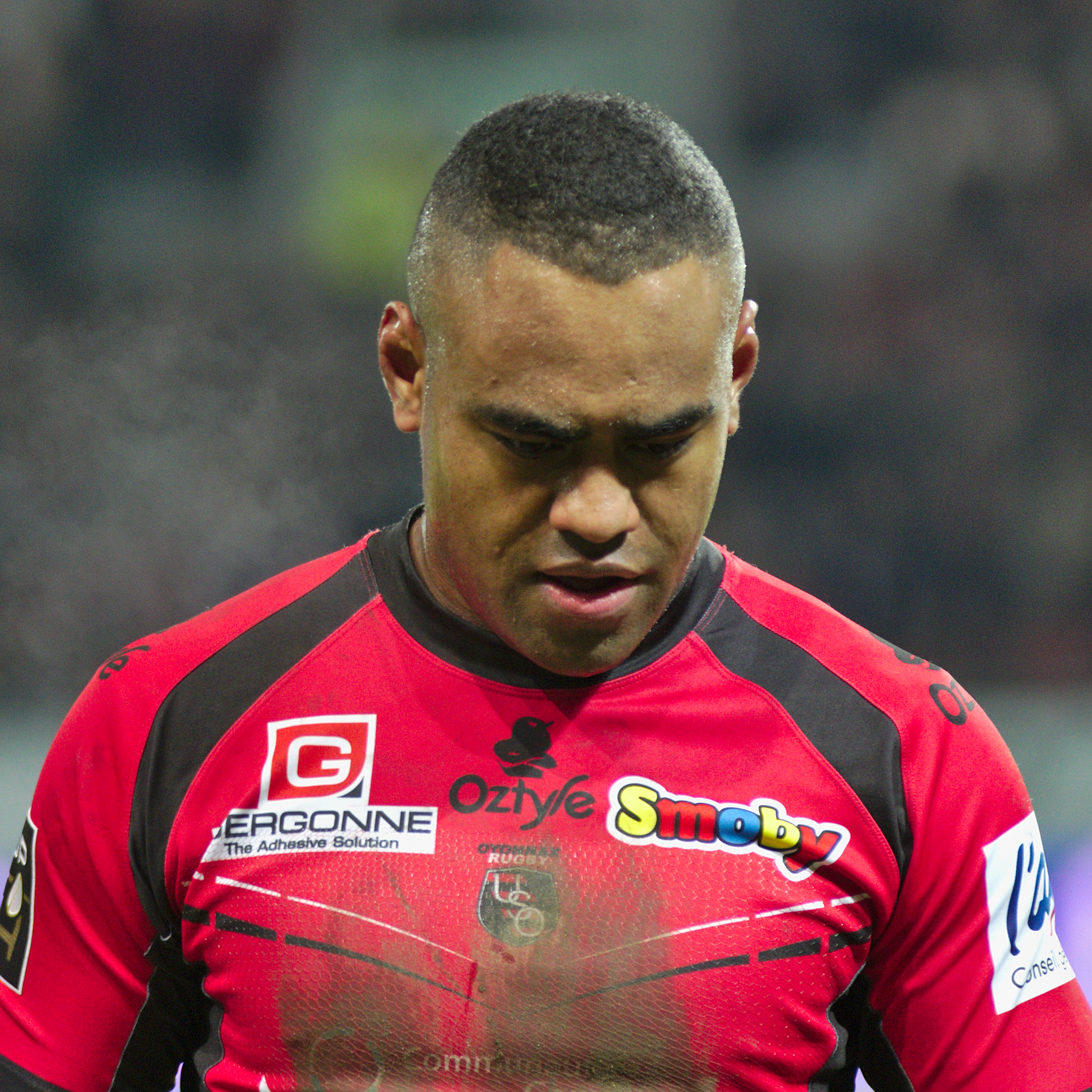
- Born: Samu Wara; 24 January 1986 (age 40) Sydney, New South Wales, Australia
- Height: 1.83 m (6 ft 0 in)
- Weight: 92 kg (14 st 7 lb)

Rugby union career
- Position: Winger
Amateur team(s)
| Years | Team | Apps | (Points) |
| 2010–12 | Northern Suburbs, NSW | | |
Senior career
| Years | Team | Apps | (Points) |
| 2013–14 | Oyannax | 10 | (0) |
| 2014 | NSW Country Eagles | 7 | (10) |
- Correct as of 5 December 2014
Super Rugby
| Years | Team | Apps | (Points) |
| 2011 | Brumbies | 0 | (0) |
| 2012 | Force | 9 | (15) |
- Correct as of 22 May 2012

Samu Wara (born 24 January 1986) is an Australian professional rugby union footballer. His regular playing position is on the wing.

== Background ==
Samu Wara was born in Sydney, New South Wales, Australia.

== Career ==
Wara was born and raised in Leichhardt, New South Wales, where he played junior rugby league. He went on to play NSWRL Premier League with Balmain Ryde Eastwood Tigers in 2007. He joined South Sydney's feeder club North Sydney Bears in 2008, where he played in the NSW Cup in 2008 and 2009. Wara made the NSW Cup Team of the Year in 2008. Wara made a total of 45 appearances for Norths and scored 18 tries.

He switched codes in 2010 to play rugby union with Northern Suburbs, and was selected to join the Brumbies academy by then coach Andy Friend. Wara was included in the Brumbies squad for 2011, but Friend was sacked at the start of the season and Wara did not get to play in the senior team. Wara joined the Western Force and made his franchise debut in Week 1 of the 2012 Super Rugby season against the Brumbies in Canberra. He went on to earn 9 caps over the season for the Force.

After a brief stint playing in Port Macquarie in 2013, Wara joined French Top 14 club Oyannax for the 2013–14 season.
