= Lachlan Mitchell =

Australian rugby union player

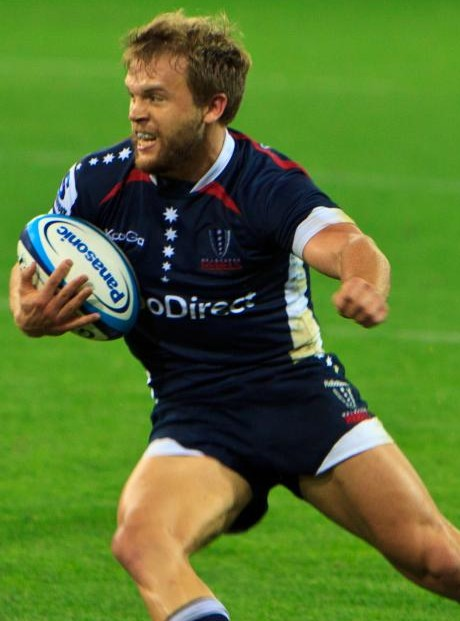
- Born: Lachlan Mitchell; 30 September 1987 (age 39) Sydney, Australia
- Height: 5 ft 10 in (1.78 m)
- Weight: 14 st 9 lb (93 kg)

Rugby union career
- Position: Centre / Wing
- Current team: Sydney University
Senior career
Years	Team	Apps	(Points)
2008–10	London Wasps	31	(10)
- Correct as of 18 February 2013
Super Rugby
Years	Team	Apps	(Points)
2011-2014	Rebels	48	(35)
- Correct as of 4 June 2014

Lachlan Mitchell born 30 September 1987 in Australia is a rugby union player for Melbourne Rebels in the Super Rugby competition. He plays as a centre wing and fullback.

== Career ==
=== Sydney ===
As a student Mitchell played for Sydney University and trained with the New South Wales Waratahs.

=== London Wasps ===
Mitchell joined Wasps in 2008, from Sydney University. He made 31 appearances as a regular support player for the 1XV and strong figure in the A League side. Mitchell was signed for Wasps on a two-year deal from the New South Wales Waratahs' academy. He joined Wasps on the recommendation of former England prop Trevor Woodman who coached him at Sydney Uni. He made his Wasps debut for against London Irish on 6 September 2008.

Upon Mitchell's signing, Wasps' Director of Rugby Ian McGeechan said, "Lachlan is a player who we feel will both benefit from and add to the Wasps environment. We have been impressed with the footage we have seen of him."

As well as the playing side of Wasps, Mitchell also went out in the community. In December 2008 he took part in a visit to children at the Wexham Park Hospital giving out Christmas cards and presents.

In April 2009, Mitchell and the London Wasps team took part in The Rugby Club's 'Crossbar Challenge' on Sky Sports. Mitchell was the only player to successfully throw the rugby ball through the posts. He therefore went through to the head-to-head stage against Wales legend Scott Quinnell to see who could throw the ball the furthest. Quinnell scored 41 metres and Mitchell scored 41.2 metres, therefore meaning that he won the challenge.

On 4 October 2009, Mitchell was injured making a try-saving tackle in the Premiership match against Northampton Saints. Mitchell was knocked out cold before he landed on the ground and remained motionless as he was treated on the pitch for 10 minutes. Mitchell was stretchered off to hospital and was given the all clear – easing fears that he had sustained a broken neck. Mitchell was diagnosed as suffering from the effects of mild concussion and was monitored by the Wasps medical team and put on a strict 5-day recovery plan. Mitchell recovered from his concussion and was selected to play at fullback in the game against Racing Metro 92 on 11 October.

Wasps director of rugby Tony Hanks commented after the game, "There aren't too many braver than Lachie," he said. "And that tackle he made at the end was a try-saving tackle and a big moment for us. It personifies what this team is about. Lachie's gone to hospital but he was awake when he left. We are hoping for the moment it's all precautionary but obviously, after a collision like that, you don't want to take any chances".

=== Melbourne Rebels ===
On 15 March 2010, London Wasps announced that Mitchell would move to Australia to join the Melbourne Rebels in the Super Rugby competition, along with Wasps' teammate Danny Cipriani.

In 2011 Mitchell played in the Rebels pre-season game against Fiji, and scored an opportunist try early in the game. On 28 May 2012 Mitchell became the Rebels most capped player, when the Rebels travelled to Wellington to be trounced by the Hurricanes.
