= Joe Tomane =

NZ rugby league & union player

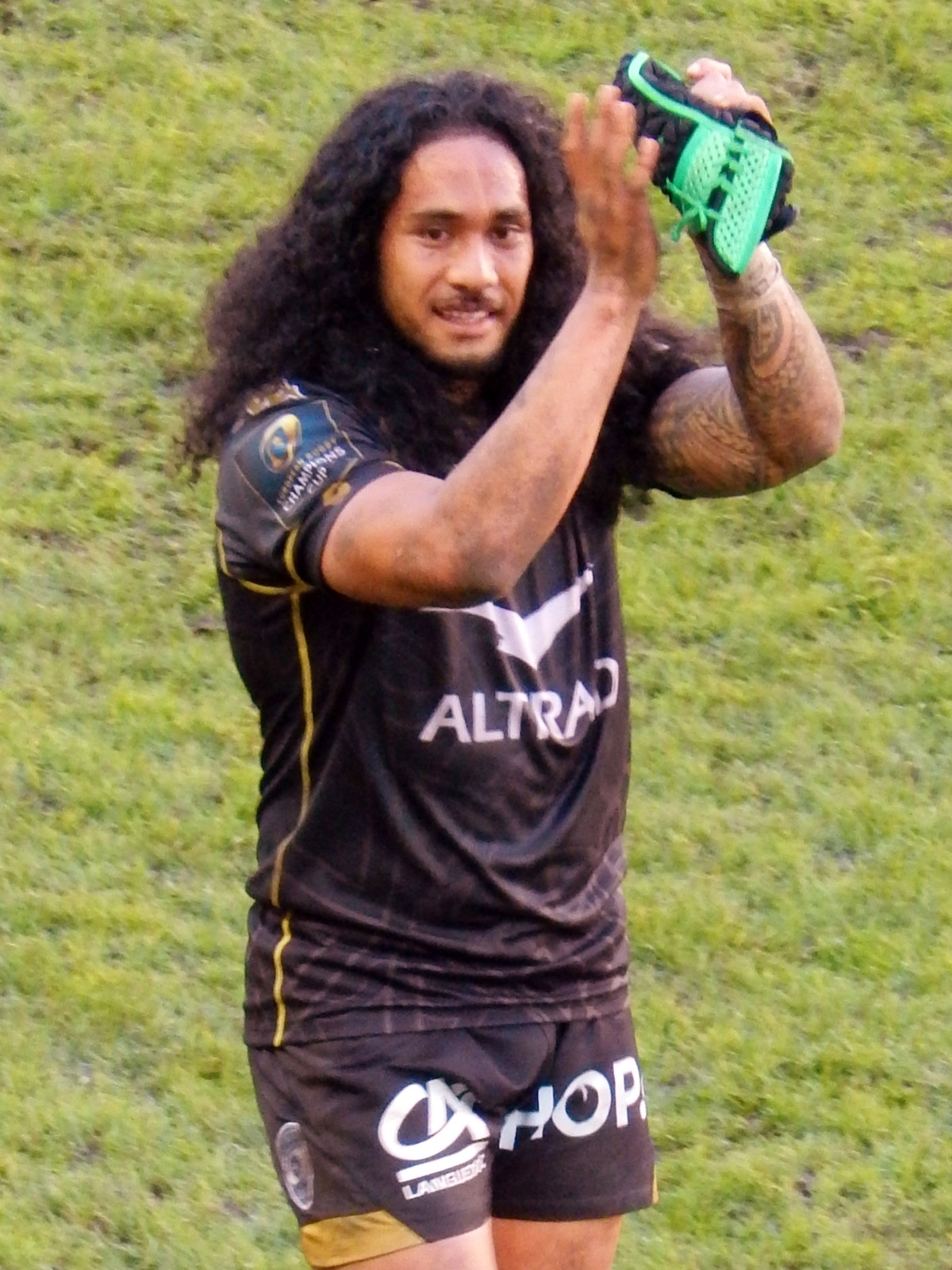
- Tomane in 2016

Personal information
- Born: Joseph Malaki Tomane; 11 February 1990 (age 36) Palmerston North, New Zealand
- Education: St. Joseph's Nudgee College
- Height: 1.88 m (6 ft 2 in)
- Weight: 102 kg (16.1 st; 225 lb)
- Relative: Jason Tomane (brother)
- Rugby league career

Playing information
- Position: Wing, Centre
Club
| Years | Team | Pld | T | G | FG | P |
|---|---|---|---|---|---|---|
| 2008–2009 | Melbourne Storm | 18 | | | | 78 |
| 2010–2011 | Gold Coast Titans | 14 | | | | 36 |
| | Total | 32 | 0 | 0 | 0 | 114 |

Sport

Rugby union career
- Position(s): Wing, Centre
Senior career
| Years | Team | Apps | (Points) |
| 2014–2015 | Canberra Vikings | 1 | (0) |
| 2016–2018 | Montpellier | 46 | (82) |
| 2018–2020 | Leinster | 21 | (15) |
| 2021–2022 | Ricoh Black Rams | 6 | (0) |
- Correct as of 7 June 2021
Super Rugby
| Years | Team | Apps | (Points) |
| 2012–2016 | Brumbies | 67 | (125) |
- Correct as of 7 June 2021
International career
| Years | Team | Apps | (Points) |
| 2012–2015 | Australia | 17 | (25) |
| 2007 | Australian Schoolboys | | |
- Correct as of 7 June 2021

Joseph Malaki Tomane (Note: Pronounced tor-mah-nee) (born 11 February 1990) is an Australian professional rugby union footballer. He played inside centre for Leinster in the first game of the 18/19 Pro14, and formerly played for the Brumbies in the Super Rugby competition. He has been capped for the Wallabies.

== Early life ==
Tomane is of Samoan descent. He was born in Palmerston North, New Zealand, but moved with his family to Brisbane, Australia when he was three years old.

In Brisbane, Tomane attended Marsden State High School and played rugby league alongside Israel Folau, Antonio Winterstein and Chris Sandow until he moved to Nudgee College for his senior year. At Nudgee, he played rugby union alongside James O'Connor. In 2007, Tomane played for the Australian Schoolboys, as did O'Connor.

== Rugby league ==
In 2008, Tomane joined the Melbourne Storm in the National Rugby League. In only his ninth NRL game on 7 June 2009, playing against the Brisbane Broncos, Tomane scored three tries and took on the goal-kicking duties for the night to achieve six goals from nine attempts to bring his total points tally for the night to 24 in the Storm's 48–4 win over the Broncos.

Tomane signed with the Gold Coast Titans on a two-year deal starting from 2010. He was also selected in the Samoan training squad in 2010. After his successful career in rugby union (see below), Tomane returned to his rugby league roots in mid-2023, to play for Brisbane-based Souths-Logan Magpies in the Queensland Rugby League.

== Rugby union ==
In June 2011 Tomane signed a two-year deal with the Brumbies to play in the Super Rugby competition.

Tomane made his International debut playing against Scotland at Hunter Stadium in Newcastle on 5 June 2012. He had limited opportunities in the wet conditions but made a try saving tackle. An ankle injury sustained during training two days later ruled him out of the subsequent test series against Wales.

On 5 July 2016, Tomane confirmed that he would be leaving the Brumbies for French club Montpellier at the end of the season.

On 12 June 2018 Leinster Rugby confirmed that they had signed Joe Tomane on a two-year deal. His contract was not renewed for the 2020/2021 season and Leinster announced that he would be released on 13 July 2020.

On 1 October 2020, Tomane confirmed his move to Japan to join Ricoh Black Rams in the Top League competition from the 2020-21 season. This was followed by several appearances for French team Biarritz in 2022.

== Personal life ==
In March 2014, Tomane was baptised along with twenty others at the Life Unlimited Church in Charnwood. Tomane was baptised as a child but was not religious growing up. However, after he turned his career around Tomane became a devout Christian. He now goes to church every week, prays before matches, has tattoos of his favourite bible verses, and pauses to thank God every time he scores a try. He also wants to start a Christian group for athletes in Canberra.

Tomane has nine tattoos, most in relation to his Christian faith or Samoan heritage. He also has three stars behind his ear, which are for daughter Starsha. His other favourite rite tattoos are the cross on his left hand and his favourite Bible verse written across his stomach – Philippians 4:13 "I can do all things through Him who gives me strength".

== Super Rugby statistics ==
As of 22 July 2016

| Season | Team | Games | Starts | Sub | Mins | Tries | Cons | Pens | Drops | Points | Yel | Red |
|---|---|---|---|---|---|---|---|---|---|---|---|---|
| 2012 | Brumbies | 13 | 11 | 2 | 823 | 4 | 0 | 0 | 0 | 20 | 0 | 0 |
| 2013 | Brumbies | 18 | 13 | 5 | 1133 | 4 | 0 | 0 | 0 | 20 | 0 | 0 |
| 2014 | Brumbies | 11 | 8 | 3 | 648 | 3 | 0 | 0 | 0 | 15 | 0 | 0 |
| 2015 | Brumbies | 18 | 18 | 0 | 1408 | 8 | 0 | 0 | 0 | 40 | 0 | 0 |
| 2016 | Brumbies | 8 | 8 | 0 | 584 | 6 | 0 | 0 | 0 | 30 | 0 | 0 |
| Total | | 68 | 58 | 10 | 4596 | 25 | 0 | 0 | 0 | 125 | 0 | 0 |
