= Michael Hobbs (rugby union) =

- Born: Michael Joseph Deans Hobbs; 18 October 1987 (age 39) Wellington, New Zealand
- Height: 1.87 m (6 ft 1 1/2 in)
- Weight: 92 kg (203 lb)
- School: Wellington College
- University: Victoria University of Wellington; University of Texas at Austin
- Notable relatives: Jock Hobbs (father); Robbie Deans (uncle); Bruce Deans (uncle); Bob Deans (great-great-uncle)

Rugby union career
- Position(s): First five-eighth Inside centre
Senior career
Years	Team	Apps	(Points)
2007	Melbourne Rebels	8	(0)
2013	Panasonic Wild Knights	7	(5)
2014 – 2016	NTT DoCoMo Red Hurricanes		
- Correct as of 19 January 2015
Provincial / State sides
Years	Team	Apps	(Points)
2008, 2011	Wellington	18	(23)
2012	North Harbour	4	(2)
- Correct as of 13 October 2012
Super Rugby
Years	Team	Apps	(Points)
2009, 2012	Blues	24	(28)
2010	Highlanders	7	(31)
- Correct as of 25 July 2012

Michael Joseph Deans Hobbs (born 18 October 1987) is a retired professional rugby union player. Hobbs previously played for the Blues and Highlanders in the Super Rugby competition. He also played for the Wellington Lions in the Air New Zealand Cup. His playing positions are First Five-Eighth and Inside Centre.

== Personal life ==
Hobbs was born in Wellington, New Zealand and was Head Boy at Wellington College in 2005. He is the son of former All Black Captain and NZ Rugby chairman Jock Hobbs and the nephew of former All Black fullback and Australian rugby union coach Robbie Deans.

== Career ==
Hobbs represented both New Zealand Schools and New Zealand Under-19s before moving to Brisbane, Australia to undertake study at the University of Queensland. He debuted for the Lions in the 2008 season after spending the two previous years contracted to the Queensland Reds Rugby Academy. He also had a stint with the Melbourne Rebels in the inaugural Australian Rugby Championship season. He went on to be drafted by the Blues for the 2009 Super 14 season.

After starting the 2010 Super rugby season by scoring four tries in the first three games, Hobbs suffered a fractured vertebra in his back and underwent spine surgery in Los Angeles. He studied at the University of Texas at Austin on exchange while he completed his rehab.

In 2011, Hobbs re-signed with the Blues and NZRU for two more years.

During the 2012 Super rugby season, Hobbs's father Jock died after a long battle with leukaemia. The 2012 ITM Cup saw Hobbs move north from Wellington to North Harbour. He played the first 3 matches before limping out of the Counties match early with ankle damage. Hobbs returned to the side for their final game against Tasman. At the end of the season he was granted an early release from his NZRU contract to take some time away from rugby.

In March 2013, Hobbs signed a one-year deal with the Panasonic Wild Knights in the Japan Top League. Panasonic won both the Japan Top League and Japan Cup championships in the 2013/14 season. At the completion of his contract with Panasonic, Hobbs signed with the NTT DoCoMo Red Hurricanes to remain in Japan for another two seasons.

After helping guide the NTT DoCoMo Red Hurricanes to their first ever win in the Japan Cup wildcard playoffs during the 2014/15 season, Hobbs was unable to take the field in the 2015/16 season due to undergoing shoulder surgery.

In 2016, Hobbs announced that he was taking a break from rugby to study for an MBA at Stanford University.
