= 2011 ITM Cup =

2011 rugby union competition in New Zealand

2011 ITM Cup season
- Countries: New Zealand
- Date: 14 July – 4 September
- Champions: Canterbury
- Runners-up: Waikato
- Promoted: Hawke's Bay
- Relegated: Southland
- Matches played: 72
- Tries scored: 378 (average 5.3 per match)
- Top point scorer: Andrew Horrell (Hawke's Bay); 152 points
- Top try scorer: Sherwin Stowers (Counties Manukau); 9 tries

Official website
- www.provincial.rugby

The 2011 ITM Cup season was the sixth season of New Zealand's provincial rugby union competition since it turned professional in 2006. The regular season began on July 14, when Otago hosted North Harbour. It involved the top fourteen rugby unions of New Zealand. For sponsorship reasons, the competition was known as the ITM Cup and it was the second season under the lead sponsor. The winner of the Championship, Hawke's Bay was promoted to the Premiership, the seventh placed Premiership team, Southland was relegated to the Championship.

== Format ==
The ITM Cup standings were sorted by a competition points system. Four points were awarded to the winning team, a draw equaled two points, whilst a loss amounted to zero points. Unions could also win their side a respectable bonus point. To receive a bonus point, they must have scored four tries or more or lose by seven or fewer points or less. Each team was placed on their total points received. If necessary of a tiebreaker, when two or more teams finish on equal points, the union who defeated the other in a head-to-head got placed higher. In case of a draw between them, the side with the biggest points differential margin got rights to be ranked above. If they were tied on points difference, it was then decided by a highest scored try count or a coin toss. This seeding format was implemented since the beginning of the 2006 competition.

The competition included a promotion-relegation process with the winner of the Championship receiving automatic promotion to the Premiership, replacing the seventh-placed team in the Premiership which was relegated to the Championship for the following year. The regular season consisted of two types of matches. The internal division matches were when each team played the other six unions in their division once, home or away. The cross-division matches were when each team played four teams from the other division, thus missing out on three teams, each from the opposite division. Each union played home or away games against teams from the other division, making a total of ten competition games for each union. The finals format allowed the top four teams from each division move on to the semi-finals. The top two division winners, based on table points, received a home semi-final. In the first round of the finals, the semi-finals, the second division winner hosted the third division winner, and the first division winner hosted the fourth division winner. The final was hosted by the top remaining seed.

== Standings ==
Source: ITM Cup standings 2011

Premiership Division
#	Team	GP	W	D	L	PF	PA	PD	TB	LB	PTS
1	Waikato	10	7	0	3	236	219	+17	4	1	33
2	Canterbury	10	6	0	4	293	230	+63	7	2	33
3	RS – Taranaki	10	7	0	3	216	194	+22	2	1	31
4	Bay of Plenty	10	6	0	4	275	212	+63	5	2	31
5	Auckland	10	5	0	5	255	261	–6	2	4	26
6	Wellington	10	5	0	5	251	260	–9	2	3	25
7	Southland	10	4	0	6	195	229	–34	2	2	20

Championship Division
#	Team	GP	W	D	L	PF	PA	PD	TB	LB	PTS
1	Manawatu	10	7	0	3	281	246	+35	4	1	33
2	Hawke's Bay	10	6	0	4	298	213	+85	4	1	29
3	Otago	10	5	0	5	223	224	–1	2	2	24
4	Counties Manukau	10	4	0	6	235	262	–27	3	3	22
5	Northland	10	4	0	6	227	279	–52	1	2	19
6	North Harbour	10	2	0	8	245	319	–74	4	2	14
7	Tasman	10	2	0	8	198	280	–82	1	4	13

=== Standings progression ===
Premiership
Team	W1	W2	W3	W4	W5	W6	W7	W8
Auckland	1 (5th)	6 (3rd)	6 (7th)	16 (3rd)	20 (5th)	25 (2nd)	26 (5th)	26 (5th)
Bay of Plenty	4 (4th)	9 (1st)	19 (1st)	20 (1st)	22 (3rd)	22 (5th)	31 (4th)	31 (4th)
Canterbury	5 (1st)	6 (2nd)	12 (3rd)	17 (2nd)	22 (4th)	27 (1st)	33 (2nd)	33 (2nd)
Southland	0 (6th)	4 (7th)	8 (6th)	13 (6th)	17 (6th)	19 (7th)	20 (7th)	20 (7th)
Taranaki	0 (7th)	5 (5th)	14 (2nd)	15 (4th)	23 (2nd)	23 (4th)	31 (3rd)	31 (3rd)
Waikato	4 (3rd)	5 (6th)	10 (4th)	14 (5th)	24 (1st)	24 (3rd)	33 (1st)	33 (1st)
Wellington	4 (2nd)	5 (4th)	10 (5th)	10 (7th)	16 (7th)	20 (6th)	25 (6th)	25 (6th)
Championship
Team	W1	W2	W3	W4	W5	W6	W7	W8
Counties Manukau	1 (4th)	10 (2nd)	10 (4th)	11 (5th)	12 (5th)	17 (4th)	22 (3rd)	22 (4th)
Hawke's Bay	0 (6th)	8 (4th)	13 (1st)	19 (2nd)	24 (2nd)	29 (2nd)	29 (2nd)	29 (2nd)
Manawatu	5 (2nd)	11 (1st)	11 (2nd)	20 (1st)	24 (1st)	29 (1st)	33 (1st)	33 (1st)
North Harbour	1 (5th)	6 (5th)	6 (6th)	6 (6th)	7 (6th)	12 (6th)	14 (6th)	14 (6th)
Northland	4 (3rd)	4 (6th)	9 (5th)	13 (4th)	13 (4th)	14 (5th)	19 (4th)	19 (5th)
Otago	5 (1st)	9 (3rd)	10 (3rd)	15 (3rd)	15 (3rd)	19 (3rd)	19 (5th)	24 (3rd)
Tasman	0 (7th)	0 (7th)	0 (7th)	6 (7th)	7 (7th)	12 (7th)	13 (7th)	13 (7th)
The table above shows a team's progression throughout the season. For each week, their cumulative points total is shown with the overall division log position in brackets.
Key:	Win	Draw	Loss	Bye				

== Regular season ==
The 2011 ITM Cup was played across eight weeks with every team playing three Tuesday or Wednesday night fixtures in a double-up round where they played twice that week. The competition started on Thursday, July 14, with Otago taking on North Harbour at Carisbrook. Due to the 2011 Rugby World Cup being hosted in New Zealand, the competition finished without semi-finals so that the World Cup could be held in September and October. The Otago and Manawatu fixture was cancelled in Week 6 of the competition due to weather and airport closures.

=== Week 1 ===
14 July 2011
19:35 NZST

Otago	46–29	North Harbour
Try: Joe Hill 16'; Eben Joubert (2) 24', 28'; Ben Atiga 45'; TJ Ioane 70'; Rob Verbakel 79'; Con: Glenn Dickson (5/5) 17', 25', 29', 46', 70'; Tony Brown (0/1); Pen: Glenn Dickson (1/3) 3'; Drop: Tony Brown 62'	Report	Try: James King 33'; Codey Rei 64'; Rudi Wulf 66'; Mat Luamanu 78'; Con: Ben Botica (3/4) 64', 66', 79'; Pen: Ben Botica (1/2) 42'

Carisbrook, Dunedin
Referee: Glen Jackson

15 July 2011
19:35 NZST

Southland	9–19	Waikato
Pen: Scott Eade (3/4) 25', 29', 35'	Report	Try: Stephen Donald 8'; Con: Stephen Donald (1/1) 9'; Pen: Stephen Donald (4/4) 16', 27', 44', 52'

Rugby Park Stadium, Invercargill
Referee: Garratt Williamson

16 July 2011
14:35 NZST

Manawatu	32–23	Hawke's Bay
Try: Aaron Smith 38'; Tomasi Cama 54'; Casey Stone 68'; Hamish Gosling 75'; Con: Aaron Cruden (3/4) 55', 69', 76'; Pen: Aaron Cruden (2/4) 12', 33'	Report	Try: Ryan McLeod 48'; Sinoti Sinoti 63'; Con: Andrew Horrell (2/2) 49', 63'; Pen: Andrew Horrell (3/3) 3', 10', 35'

Arena Manawatu, Palmerston North
Referee: Richard Kelly

16 July 2011
17:35 NZST

Northland	19–9	Tasman
Try: Daniel Faleafa 3'; Aaron Bancroft (2) 20', 45'; Con: Lachie Munro (2/3) 4', 46'	Report	Pen: Andrew Goodman (3/3) 18', 26', 68'

Okara Park, Whangārei
Referee: Shane McDermott

16 July 2011
19:35 NZST

Taranaki	5–23	Wellington
Try: Jayden Hayward 50'; Con: Beauden Barrett (0/1); Pen: Beauden Barrett (0/1)	Report	Try: Jason Woodward (3) 39', 57', 72'; Con: Michael Hobbs (0/1); Piri Weepu (1/2) 57'; Pen: Michael Hobbs (1/2) 17'; Piri Weepu (1/2) 67'

Yarrow Stadium, New Plymouth
Referee: Jonathon White

17 July 2011
14:35 NZST

Auckland	33–40	Canterbury
Try: Onosai Tololima-Auva'a 29'; Penalty try 55'; Alby Mathewson 57'; Con: Gareth Anscombe (3/3) 30', 56', 57'; Pen: Gareth Anscombe (4/4) 3', 7', 10', 60'	Report	Try: Brendon O'Connor 20'; Ryan Crotty 35'; Johnny McNicholl 39'; Willi Heinz 49'; Con: Tom Taylor (4/4) 21', 36', 39', 50'; Pen: Tom Taylor (4/6) 32', 52', 64', 78'

Eden Park, Auckland
Referee: Chris Pollock

17 July 2011
16:35 NZST

Counties Manukau	13–20	Bay of Plenty
Try: Niva Ta'auso 38'; Con: James Semple (1/1) 39'; Pen: James Semple (2/3) 14', 48'	Report	Try: Daniel Perrin 22'; Toby Arnold 55'; Con: Daniel Waenga (2/2) 23', 56'; Pen: Daniel Waenga (2/3) 12', 32'; Chris Noakes (0/1)

Bayer Growers Stadium, Pukekohe
Referee: Shaun Elliott

=== Week 2 ===
19 July 2011
18:05 NZST

North Harbour	39–15	Tasman
Try: Mat Luamanu (2) 45', 51'; David Raikuna 55'; Ken Pisi 60'; Manu Leiataua 79'; Con: Ben Botica (4/5) 46', 52', 61', 79'; Pen: Ben Botica (2/2) 31', 37'	Report	Try: Robbie Malneek 28'; Mark Bright 39'; Con: Andrew Goodman (1/2) 29'; Pen: Andrew Goodman (1/1) 3'

North Harbour Stadium, Albany
Referee: Ben Skeen

19 July 2011
20:05 NZST

Hawke's Bay	29–18	Southland
Try: Chris Eaton 21'; Andrew Horrell 55'; Con: Andrew Horrell (2/2) 22', 56'; Pen: Andrew Horrell (5/5) 13', 17', 43', 64', 79'	Report	Try: Robbie Robinson 48'; John Hardie 60'; Con: Robbie Robinson (1/2) 61'; Pen: Robbie Robinson (2/3) 5', 10'

McLean Park, Napier
Referee: Vinny Munro

20 July 2011
17:35 NZST

Counties Manukau	32–25	Manawatu
Try: Sherwin Stowers 17'; Serge Lilo 52'; Con: James Semple (2/2) 19', 53'; Pen: James Semple (6/7) 7', 13', 31', 37', 45', 48'	Report	Try: Michael Fitzgerald 11'; Asaeli Tikoirotuma 27'; Lewis Marshall 57'; Con: Aaron Cruden (2/3) 11', 58'; Pen: Aaron Cruden (2/2) 5', 34'; Cards: Aaron Smith (yellow card) 52'

Bayer Growers Stadium, Pukekohe
Referee: Sheldon Eden-Whaitiri

20 July 2011
19:35 NZST

Auckland	25–32	Otago
Try: Joe Rokocoko (2) 11', 23'; Pauliasi Manu 68'; Con: Gareth Anscombe (2/3) 13', 70'; Pen: Gareth Anscombe (2/3) 35', 41'	Report	Try: TJ Ioane 55'; Glenn Dickson 61'; Buxton Popoali'i 64'; Con: Glenn Dickson (1/3) 56'; Pen: Glenn Dickson (5/6) 3', 16', 27', 46', 58'; Cards: Halani Aulika (yellow card) 50'

Eden Park, Auckland
Referee: Garratt Williamson

21 July 2011
19:35 NZST

Waikato	23–30	Taranaki
Try: Toby Smith 2'; Tawera Kerr-Barlow 12'; Con: Stephen Donald (2/2) 3', 13'; Pen: Trent Renata (3/3) 50', 60', 63'	Report	Try: Andre Taylor 28'; Jayden Hayward 54'; Chris Walker 67'; Blade Thomson 79'; Con: Andre Taylor (2/3) 55', 68'; Beauden Barrett (0/1); Pen: Andre Taylor (2/2) 43', 52'; Beauden Barrett (0/1)

Waikato Stadium, Hamilton
Referee: Kane McBride

23 July 2011
12:35 NZST

Manawatu	30–22	Northland
Try: Asaeli Tikoirotuma 25'; Johnny Leota 28'; Aaron Smith 65'; Callum Gibbins 77'; Con: Aaron Cruden (2/4) 29', 77'; Pen: Aaron Cruden (2/2) 12', 56'	Report	Try: Jared Payne 14'; Cameron Eyre 37'; Lachie Munro 60'; Con: Lachie Munro (2/3) 15', 61'; Pen: Lachie Munro (1/1) 5'

Arena Manawatu, Palmerston North
Referee: James McPhail

23 July 2011
14:35 NZST

Canterbury	19–22	Southland – RS
Try: Patrick Osborne 8'; Sean Maitland 20'; Con: Tom Taylor (0/2); Pen: Tom Taylor (3/3) 13', 28', 69'	Report	Try: Scott Cowan 60'; Con: James Wilson (1/1) 61'; Pen: James Wilson (4/5) 10', 18', 32', 57'; Robbie Robinson (0/1); Drop: James Wilson 77'

Rugby Park, Christchurch
Referee: Jonathon White

23 July 2011
17:35 NZST

Bay of Plenty	38–17	North Harbour
Try: Sam Cane 3'; Lelia Masaga (2) 8', 44'; Ben Smith 78'; Con: Chris Noakes (3/4) 4', 9', 78'; Pen: Chris Noakes (4/4) 23', 28', 62', 70'	Report	Try: Mat Luamanu 55'; Codey Rei 66'; Con: Ben Botica (1/1) 56'; Willie Walker (1/1) 67'; Pen: Ben Botica (1/1) 37'

Baypark Stadium, Tauranga
Referee: Grant Stuart

23 July 2011
19:35 NZST

Wellington	17–21	Auckland
Try: Dane Coles 8'; Jeremy Thrush 74'; Con: Lima Sopoaga (2/2) 8', 75'; Pen: Lima Sopoaga (1/2) 28'	Report	Try: Nathan Hughes 7'; Charles Piutau 55'; Con: Gareth Anscombe (1/2) 7'; Pen: Gareth Anscombe (3/5) 33', 39', 42'

Wellington Regional Stadium, Wellington
Referee: Glen Jackson

24 July 2011
14:35 NZST

Hawke's Bay	27–13	Otago
Try: Sona Taumalolo 35'; Daniel Kirkpatrick 46'; Kahn Fotuali'i 60'; Con: Andrew Horrell (3/3) 36', 47', 61'; Pen: Andrew Horrell (2/3) 2', 6'	Report	Try: Joe Hill 56'; Con: Glenn Dickson (1/1) 56'; Pen: Glenn Dickson (2/2) 18', 26'

McLean Park, Napier
Referee: Matthew Muir

24 July 2011
16:35 NZST

Tasman	23–32	Counties Manukau
Try: Joe Wheeler 26'; Mitchell Scott 77'; Con: Andrew Goodman (2/2) 28', 78'; Pen: Andrew Goodman (3/4) 21', 44', 55'	Report	Try: Ahsee Tuala (2) 2', 58'; Sherwin Stowers (2) 52', 75'; Con: Tasesa Lavea (2/3) 3', 53'; James Semple (1/1) 75'; Pen: Tasesa Lavea (2/2) 22', 35'

Lansdowne Park, Blenheim
Referee: Nick Briant

=== Week 3 ===
26 July 2011
19:35 NZST

Bay of Plenty	36–8	Waikato
Try: Toby Arnold (2) 22', 56'; John Pareanga 60'; Taniela Moa 70'; Con: Daniel Waenga (1/3) 23'; Chris Noakes (1/1) 71'; Pen: Daniel Waenga (4/5) 15', 29', 32', 48'	Report	Try: Toby Lynn 65'; Con: Trent Renata (0/1); Pen: Trent Renata (1/1) 25'

Rotorua International Stadium, Rotorua
Referee: Mike Fraser

27 July 2011
18:05 NZST

Wellington	37–28	Canterbury
Try: Michael Hobbs 21'; Scott Fuglistaller 34'; Victor Vito 43'; Frae Wilson 70'; Con: Lima Sopoaga (4/4) 22', 35', 44', 71'; Pen: Lima Sopoaga (3/4) 8', 28', 66'	Report	Try: Robbie Fruean 2'; Tom Taylor 18'; Nepo Laulala 75'; Ben Funnell 79'; Con: Tom Taylor (2/2) 3', 19'; Tyler Bleyendaal (2/2) 76', 79'; Pen: Tyler Bleyendaal (0/1)

Wellington Regional Stadium, Wellington
Referee: Bryce Lawrence

27 July 2011
20:05 NZST

Northland	16–23	Taranaki
Try: Aaron Bancroft 28'; Con: Lachie Munro (1/1) 29'; Pen: Lachie Munro (3/4) 3', 15', 59'	Report	Try: Jayden Hayward 33'; Laurence Corlett 36'; Mahonri Schwalger 65'; Con: Beauden Barrett (1/3) 66'; Pen: Beauden Barrett (2/2) 52', 68'

Okara Park, Whangārei
Referee: Shaun Elliott

28 July 2011
19:35 NZST

North Harbour	10–39	Hawke's Bay
Try: Mat Luamanu 78'; Con: Ben Botica (1/1) 79'; Pen: Willie Walker (1/1) 33'	Report	Try: Tua Saseve 20'; Sona Taumalolo 39'; Tumatauenga Umaga-Marshall 54'; Gillies Kaka 65'; Hikairo Forbes 73'; Con: Andrew Horrell (4/5) 21', 39', 55', 74'; Pen: Andrew Horrell (2/2) 26', 46'

North Harbour Stadium, Albany
Referee: Sheldon Eden-Whaitiri

29 July 2011
18:05 NZST

RS – Southland	22–14	Counties Manuaku
Try: Josh Bekhuis 37'; Con: James Wilson (1/1) 37'; Pen: James Wilson (5/6) 13', 28', 47', 64', 75'	Report	Try: Grant Henson 72'; Con: James Semple (0/1); Pen: Tasesa Lavea (2/2) 5', 18'; James Semple (1/1) 52'

Rugby Park Stadium, Invercargill
Referee: Glen Jackson

29 July 2011
20:05 NZST

Waikato	35–6	Tasman
Try: Tim Mikkelson 12'; Declan O'Donnell 50'; Rory Grice 73'; Ted Tauroa 79'; Con: Trent Renata (3/4) 13', 74', 79'; Pen: Trent Renata (3/3) 25', 36', 67'	Report	Pen: Andrew Goodman (2/3) 18', 29'

Waikato Stadium, Hamilton
Referee: Richard Kelly

30 July 2011
14:35 NZST

Canterbury	42–15	Manawatu
Try: Willi Heinz 27'; Telusa Veainu 39'; Brendon O'Connor 61'; Tyler Bleyendaal 72'; Robbie Fruean (2) 77', 80'; Con: Tyler Bleyendaal (3/6) 29', 73', 78'; Pen: Tyler Bleyendaal (2/3) 18', 50'	Report	Try: Aaron Smith (2) 14', 79'; Con: Aaron Cruden (1/1) 15'; Daniel Kelly (0/1); Pen: Aaron Cruden (1/1) 4'

Rugby Park, Christchurch
Referee: Keith Brown

30 July 2011
16:35 NZST

Northland	20–17	Otago
Try: Joel McKenty 35'; Lachie Munro 58'; Con: Lachie Munro (2/2) 36', 60'; Pen: Lachie Munro (2/3) 12', 15'	Report	Try: TJ Ioane 18'; Kees Meeuws 53'; Con: Tony Brown (2/2) 19', 54'; Pen: Tony Brown (1/2) 10'

Okara Park, Whangārei
Referee: Ben Skeen

31 July 2011
14:35 NZST

Taranaki	39–11	Auckland
Try: Scott Waldrom 46'; Tyson Keats 52'; Kurt Baker 55'; Jayden Hayward 56'; Mahonri Schwalger 79'; Con: Beauden Barrett (4/5) 47', 53', 55', 56'; Pen: Beauden Barrett (2/3) 3', 25'	Report	Try: Brent Ward 78'; Con: Piers Francis (0/1); Pen: Gareth Anscombe (2/2) 7', 42'

Yarrow Stadium, New Plymouth
Referee: Chris Pollock

31 July 2011
16:35 NZST

Bay of Plenty	32–0	Wellington
Try: Taniela Moa 3'; John Pareanga 27'; Phil Burleigh 32'; Toby Arnold 78'; Con: Chris Noakes (3/4) 4', 28', 79'; Pen: Chris Noakes (2/4) 16', 66'	Report	Pen: Jason Woodward (0/1)

Baypark Stadium, Tauranga
Referee: Vinny Munro

=== Week 4 ===
2 August 2011
18:05 NZST

Hawke's Bay	19–21	Tasman
Try: Karl Lowe 39'; Adam Bradey 63'; Con: Richard Buckman (0/2); Pen: Richard Buckman (3/3) 7', 14', 25'; Cards: Anthony Perenise (yellow card) 31'	Report	Try: Mitchell Scott 22'; Mark Bright 67'; Con: Andrew Goodman (1/2) 69'; Pen: Andrew Goodman (3/5) 28', 31', 48'

McLean Park, Napier
Referee: Angus Gardner (Australia)

2 August 2011
20:05 NZST

Manawatu	32–21	North Harbour
Try: Nehe Milner-Skudder 29'; Tomasi Cama 53'; Aaron Smith 64'; Aaron Cruden 79'; Con: Aaron Cruden (3/4) 55', 65', 79'; Pen: Aaron Cruden (1/2) 23'; Drop: Tomasi Cama 61'	Report	Try: David Raikuna 39'; Willie Walker 68'; Con: Willie Walker (0/1); Ben Botica (1/1) 69'; Pen: Willie Walker (3/4) 8', 25', 39'

Arena Manawatu, Palmerston North
Referee: Bryce Lawrence

3 August 2011
17:35 NZST

Otago	30–14	Counties Manukau
Try: Johnny Legg 17'; Ben Smith 71'; Con: Glenn Dickson (1/2) 18'; Pen: Glenn Dickson (6/6) 26', 35', 38', 51', 63', 79'	Report	Try: Adam Cathcart 3'; Con: Baden Kerr (0/1); Pen: Baden Kerr (3/3) 23', 47', 49'

Carisbrook, Dunedin
Referee: Shane McDermott

3 August 2011
19:35 NZST

Auckland	39–26	Southland
Try: Hadleigh Parkes 10'; Chris Lowrey 29'; Joe Rokocoko 56'; Gareth Anscombe 60'; Pauliasi Manu 78'; Con: Gareth Anscombe (4/5) 30', 57', 61', 79'; Pen: Gareth Anscombe (2/2) 34', 53'	Report	Try: Glen Horton 13'; Scott Eade 20'; James Wilson 70'; Tim Boys 73'; Con: James Wilson (3/4) 14', 71', 74'

Eden Park, Auckland
Referee: Vinny Munro

4 August 2011
19:35 NZST

Northland	30–23	Bay of Plenty
Try: Bryce Heem (2) 18', 37'; Mark Burman 29'; Con: Lachie Munro (3/3) 19', 30', 38'; Pen: Lachie Munro (3/4) 13', 46', 51'; Cards: Ash Moeke (yellow card) 57'	Report	Try: Sam Cane 33'; Lelia Masaga 72'; Toby Arnold 76'; Con: Daniel Waenga (1/3) 34'; Pen: Daniel Waenga (2/2) 26', 48'

Okara Park, Whangārei
Referee: Mike Fraser

5 August 2011
18:05 NZST

Tasman	32–36	Canterbury
Try: Andrew Goodman 43'; Tevita Koloamatangi 59'; Tom Marshall 68'; Mark Bright (2) 73', 79'; Con: Andrew Goodman (1/4) 60'; Tom Marshall (1/1) 69'; Pen: Andrew Goodman (1/2) 23'	Report	Try: Patrick Osborne (2) 2', 32'; Telusa Veainu (3) 24', 45', 53'; Con: Tyler Bleyendaal (2/3) 3', 25'; Tom Taylor (2/2) 46', 55'; Pen: Tom Taylor (1/2) 66'

Lansdowne Park, Blenheim
Referee: Keith Brown

5 August 2011
20:05 NZST

Hawke's Bay	40–20	Wellington
Try: Karl Lowe 6'; Andrew Horrell 31', 37'; Gillies Kaka 34'; Tua Saseve 63'; Mark Jackman 79'; Con: Andrew Horrell (2/4) 64', 79'; Daniel Kirkpatrick (0/2); Pen: Andrew Horrell (2/3) 2', 52'	Report	Try: Jeremy Thrush 23'; Jason Woodward 69'; Con: Jason Woodward (1/1) 24'; Lima Sopoaga (1/1) 70'; Pen: Jason Woodward (1/1) 19'; Lima Sopoaga (1/1) 48'

McLean Park, Napier
Referee: Matthew Muir

6 August 2011
14:35 NZST

Otago	12–19	Southland
Pen: Glenn Dickson (3/3) 12', 14', 55'; Drop: Hayden Parker 80'; Cards: James McGougan (yellow card) 31'	Report	Try: Robbie Robinson 6'; John Hardie 26'; Scott Cowan 39'; Con: James Wilson (2/3) 27', 39'; Pen: James Wilson (0/1); Cards: Chris King (yellow card) 31'

Carisbrook, Dunedin
Referee: James McPhail

6 August 2011
16:35 NZST

Manawatu	15–10	Taranaki
Try: Doug Tietjens 33'; Asaeli Tikoirotuma 64'; Con: Aaron Cruden (1/2) 65'; Pen: Aaron Cruden (1/1) 16'	Report	Try: Jayden Hayward 31'; Con: Beauden Barrett (1/1) 32'; Pen: Beauden Barrett (1/3) 46'

Arena Manawatu, Palmerston North
Referee: Nick Briant

7 August 2011
14:35 NZST

Counties Manukau	15–22	Waikato
Pen: Baden Kerr (5/5) 15', 30', 39', 55', 71'	Report	Try: Latu Talakai 43'; Con: Stephen Donald (1/1) 44'; Pen: Stephen Donald (5/5) 7', 10', 19', 65', 75'

Bayer Growers Stadium, Pukekohe
Referee: Kane McBride

7 August 2011
16:35 NZST

North Harbour	13–29	Auckland
Try: Irwin Finau 39'; Con: Ben Botica (1/1) 40'; Pen: Ben Botica (2/3) 11', 25'	Report	Try: Chris Lowrey 17'; Steven Luatua 47'; George Moala 55'; Gareth Anscombe 76'; Con: Gareth Anscombe (3/4) 48', 56', 77'; Pen: Gareth Anscombe (1/1) 32'

North Harbour Stadium, Albany
Referee: Glen Jackson

=== Week 5 ===
9 August 2011
19:35 NZST

Taranaki	39–33	Bay of Plenty
Try: Samuela Vunisa 39'; Kurt Baker 42'; Con: Beauden Barrett (1/2) 43'; Pen: Beauden Barrett (9/9) 6', 18', 27', 32', 36', 47', 53', 66', 69'; Cards: Scott Waldrom (yellow card) 79'	Report	Try: Lelia Masaga (2) 23', 24'; Lance MacDonald 75'; Sam Cane 79'; Con: Chris Noakes (2/2) 23', 25'; Daniel Waenga (0/2); Pen: Chris Noakes (2/4) 11', 15'; Daniel Waenga (1/2) 62'; Cards: Sam Cane (yellow card) 36'

Yarrow Stadium, New Plymouth
Referee: Glen Jackson

10 August 2011
14:35 NZST

Canterbury	13–27	Waikato
Try: Nasi Manu 18'; Con: Tom Taylor (1/1) 19'; Pen: Tom Taylor (2/2) 38', 45'	Report	Try: Toby Smith 3'; Toby Lynn 7'; Tim Mikkelson 10'; Richard Kahui 25'; Con: Stephen Donald (2/4) 3', 11'; Pen: Stephen Donald (1/2) 43'

Rugby Park, Christchurch
Referee: Richard Kelly

10 August 2011
20:05 NZST

Wellington	43–19	Northland
Try: Frae Wilson 9'; Alapati Leiua (2) 22', 39'; Faifili Levave 43'; Victor Vito 53'; Dane Coles 56'; Con: Lima Sopoaga (5/6) 23', 39', 44', 54', 57'; Pen: Lima Sopoaga (1/1) 3'	Report	Try: Jared Payne 73'; Con: Lachie Munro (1/1) 74'; Pen: Lachie Munro (4/4) 13', 39', 48', 50'

Wellington Regional Stadium, Wellington
Referee: Grant Stuart

11 August 2011
19:35 NZST

Auckland	25–22	Counties Manukau
Try: George Moala 45'; Con: Gareth Anscombe (1/1) 46'; Pen: Gareth Anscombe (6/7) 11', 19', 23', 28', 40', 70'	Report	Try: Sherwin Stowers 33'; Con: Baden Kerr (1/1) 34'; Pen: Baden Kerr (5/5) 7', 31', 40', 55', 73'; Cards: Simon Lemalu (yellow card) 45'

Eden Park, Auckland
Referee: Kane McBride

12 August 2011
19:35 NZST

Taranaki	26–23	Tasman
Try: Jackson Ormond 25'; Andre Taylor 66'; Con: Andre Taylor (1/1) 26'; Jack Cameron (1/1) 68'; Pen: Andre Taylor (4/4) 20', 38', 58', 63'	Report	Try: Andrew Goodman 9'; Hamish Cochrane 79'; Con: Andrew Goodman (2/2) 10', 79'; Pen: Andrew Goodman (3/4) 6', 23', 34'

Yarrow Stadium, New Plymouth
Referee: Ben Skeen

13 August 2011
14:35 NZST

RS – Southland	25–23	North Harbour
Try: Tim Cornforth 2'; Scott Cowan (2) 43', 80'; Con: James Wilson (2/3) 3', 80'; Pen: James Wilson (2/2) 59', 71'	Report	Try: James Parsons 5'; Irwin Finau 10'; Con: Ben Botica (2/2) 6', 12'; Pen: Ben Botica (3/3) 20', 40', 56'

Rugby Park Stadium, Invercargill
Referee: Chris Pollock

13 August 2011
17:35 NZST

Bay of Plenty	13–32	Hawke's Bay
Try: Luke Braid 76'; Con: Daniel Waenga (1/1) 77'; Pen: Daniel Waenga (2/2) 14', 45'	Report	Try: Kahn Fotuali'i 5'; Israel Dagg 34'; Zac Guildford (2) 71', 79'; Con: Andrew Horrell (2/3) 6', 35'; Kahn Fotuali'i (1/1) 79'; Pen: Andrew Horrell (2/2) 32', 43'

Rotorua International Stadium, Rotorua
Referee: Mike Fraser

13 August 2011
19:35 NZST

Wellington	25–31	Manawatu
Try: Dane Coles (2) 2', 17'; Jeremy Thrush 79'; Con: Lima Sopoaga (2/3) 3', 18'; Pen: Lima Sopoaga (2/3) 51', 66'; Cards: Jeremy Thrush (yellow card) 22'	Report	Try: Tomasi Cama 13'; Asaeli Tikoirotuma 47'; Callum Gibbins 71'; Con: Aaron Cruden (2/3) 14', 72'; Pen: Aaron Cruden (3/4) 7', 23', 33'; Drop: Aaron Cruden 76'

Wellington Regional Stadium, Wellington
Referee: Shaun Elliott

14 August 2011
14:35 NZST

Canterbury	28–13	Northland
Try: Patrick Osborne 27'; Nasi Manu 38'; Luke Romano 48'; Johnny McNicholl 78'; Con: Tyler Bleyendaal (1/3) 49'; Tom Taylor (0/1); Pen: Tyler Bleyendaal (1/2) 60'; Tom Taylor (1/1) 64'	Report	Try: Cameron Goodhue 8'; Con: Lachie Munro (1/1) 9'; Pen: Glenn Dickson (2/2) 5', 21'

Rugby Park, Christchurch
Referee: Glen Jackson

14 August 2011
16:35 NZST

Waikato	25–10	Otago
Try: Henry Speight 17'; Brendon Leonard 23'; Declan O'Donnell 69'; Marcel Cummings-Toone 73'; Con: Stephen Donald (1/2) 24'; Trent Renata (0/2); Pen: Stephen Donald (1/2) 16'	Report	Try: Buxton Popoali'i 37'; Con: Glenn Dickson (1/1) 38'; Pen: Glenn Dickson (1/1) 4'

Waikato Stadium, Hamilton
Referee: Nick Briant

=== Week 6 ===
16 August 2011
19:35 NZST

Tasman	30–28	Auckland
Try: James Marshall 4'; Mark Bright 35'; Andrew Goodman 49'; Con: Andrew Goodman (3/3) 5', 36', 50'; Pen: Andrew Goodman (3/4) 20', 44', 46'		Try: Brent Ward 26'; Teddy Stanaway 31'; Hadleigh Parkes 80'; Con: Piers Francis (2/2) 27', 31'; Gareth Anscombe (0/1); Pen: Piers Francis (2/2) 17', 42'; Gareth Anscombe (1/1) 60'

Trafalgar Park, Nelson
Referee: Mike Fraser

17 August 2011
18:05 NZST

Counties Manukau	40–32	North Harbour
Try: Mark Price 15'; Tim Nanai-Williams 40'; Mark Selwyn 43'; Sherwin Stowers 54'; Bundee Aki 70'; Con: James Semple (3/5) 40', 44', 55'; Pen: James Semple (2/2) 18', 24'; Baden Kerr (1/1) 76'	Report	Try: Rudi Wulf 7'; Mat Luamanu (2) 47', 72'; Ben Botica 59'; Con: Ben Botica (3/4) 8', 48', 60'; Pen: Ben Botica (2/2) 3', 25'

Bayer Growers Stadium, Pukekohe
Referee: James McPhail

18 August 2011
19:35 NZST

Wellington	30–25	Southland
Try: Apoua Stewart 28'; Brad Shields (2) 59', 74'; Con: Lima Sopoaga (3/3) 28', 60', 75'; Pen: Lima Sopoaga (3/3) 15', 20', 48'	Report	Try: Josh Bekhuis 26'; Matt Saunders (2) 33', 43'; Tony Koonwaiyou 53'; Con: Robbie Robinson (1/4) 54'; Pen: Robbie Robinson (0/1); Marty McKenzie (1/1) 79'

Wellington Regional Stadium, Wellington
Referee: Sheldon Eden-Whaitiri

20 August 2011
12:35 NZST

Canterbury	27–0	Taranaki
Try: Johnny McNicholl 3'; Sean Maitland 11'; Ash Parker 39'; Robbie Fruean 76'; Con: Tyler Bleyendaal (2/4) 12', 79'; Pen: Tyler Bleyendaal (1/2) 49'	Report	Pen: Jack Cameron (0/3); Jayden Hayward (0/1)

Rugby Park, Christchurch
Referee: Ben Skeen

20 August 2011
14:35 NZST

Auckland	25–16	Bay of Plenty
Try: Hadleigh Parkes 7'; Steven Luatua 64'; Dave Thomas 69'; Con: Gareth Anscombe (2/3) 8', 70'; Pen: Gareth Anscombe (2/4) 30', 47'	Report	Try: Luke Braid 34'; Con: Chris Noakes (1/1) 34'; Pen: Chris Noakes (3/3) 17', 38', 51'

Eden Park, Auckland
Referee: Richard Kelly

20 August 2011
17:35 NZST

North Harbour	33–26	Northland
Try: Willie Walker 19'; David Raikuna 47'; Mat Luamanu 65'; Con: Ben Botica (3/3) 20', 48', 66'; Pen: Ben Botica (4/4) 16', 31', 51', 75'	Report	Try: Cameron Goodhue 56'; Bryce Heem 60'; Con: Lachie Munro (2/2) 57', 61'; Pen: Lachie Munro (4/5) 6', 11', 27', 39'

North Harbour Stadium, Albany
Referee: Keith Brown

20 August 2011
19:35 NZST

Manawatu	54–20	Waikato
Try: James Oliver 5'; Craig Clare 9'; Nick Crosswell 15'; Aaron Cruden 27'; Asaeli Tikoirotuma 31'; Lewis Marshall 75'; Con: Aaron Cruden (6/6) 6', 10', 15', 28', 32', 75'; Pen: Aaron Cruden (4/4) 48', 54', 67', 70'	Report	Try: Jackson Willison 39'; Savenaca Tokula 42'; Con: Trent Renata (2/2) 40', 42'; Pen: Trent Renata (2/2) 13', 43'

Arena Manawatu, Palmerston North
Referee: Vinny Munro

21 August 2011
14:35 NZST

Tasman	16–19	Otago
Try: Riki Hoeata 68'; Con: Andrew Goodman (1/1) 69'; Pen: Andrew Goodman (3/3) 9', 18', 40'	Report	Try: Buxton Popoali'i 53'; Con: Glenn Dickson (1/1) 54'; Pen: Glenn Dickson (4/5) 11', 15', 22', 79'; Cards: TJ Ioane (yellow card) 39'

Trafalgar Park, Nelson
Referee: Matthew Muir

21 August 2011
16:35 NZST

Hawke's Bay	44–14	Counties Manukau
Try: Karl Lowe (2) 12', 17'; Mark Jackman 21'; Ben Tameifuna 53'; Maselino Paulino 70'; Richard Buckman 77'; Con: Andrew Horrell (4/6) 13', 17', 22', 54'; Pen: Andrew Horrell (2/2) 6', 50'	Report	Try: Bundee Aki 36'; Sherwin Stowers 60'; Con: James Semple (1/1) 37'; Baden Kerr (1/1) 61'

McLean Park, Napier
Referee: Glen Jackson

=== Week 7 ===
23 August 2011
18:05 NZST

Waikato	31–27	Wellington
Try: Henry Speight 24'; Savenaca Tokula 35'; Tim Mikkelson 65'; Con: Trent Renata (2/3) 36', 66'; Pen: Trent Renata (4/4) 31', 46', 58', 60'	Report	Try: Alapati Leiua 3'; Michael Hobbs 40'; Apoua Stewart 80'; Con: Lima Sopoaga (3/3) 4', 40', 80'; Pen: Lima Sopoaga (2/3) 29', 43'; Cards: Scott Fuglistaller (yellow card) 22'

Waikato Stadium, Hamilton
Referee: Bryce Lawrence

23 August 2011
20:05 NZST

Bay of Plenty	35–31	Canterbury
Try: Toby Arnold 7'; Colin Bourke 14'; Con: Chris Noakes (2/2) 8', 15'; Pen: Chris Noakes (6/6) 12', 26', 31', 35', 60', 80'; Drop: Chris Noakes 40'	Report	Try: Luke Romano 45'; Willi Heinz 51'; Ryan Crotty 60'; Telusa Veainu 76'; Con: Tyler Bleyendaal (4/4) 46', 51', 61', 77'; Pen: Tyler Bleyendaal (1/1) 4'

Baypark Stadium, Tauranga
Referee: Chris Pollock

24 August 2011
18:05 NZST

Northland	43–34	Hawke's Bay
Try: Matt Wallis (2) 5', 21'; Simon Munro (2) 33', 76'; Daniel Mason 45'; Warren Dunn 55'; Con: Lachie Munro (5/6) 5', 22', 34', 47', 56'; Pen: Lachie Munro (1/1) 19'	Report	Try: Brodie Retallick 28'; Andrew Horrell 39'; Richard Buckman 58'; Con: Andrew Horrell (2/3) 40', 59'; Pen: Andrew Horrell (5/5) 10', 37', 38', 48', 71'

Okara Park, Whangārei
Referee: Glen Jackson

24 August 2011
20:05 NZST

Southland	12–15	Taranaki – RS
Pen: James Wilson (4/5) 2', 21', 51', 74'	Report	Pen: Beauden Barrett (5/7) 6', 31', 38', 49', 65'

Rugby Park Stadium, Invercargill
Referee: Nick Briant

25 August 2011
19:35 NZST

Tasman	23–27	Manawatu
Try: Joe Wheeler (2) 6', 28'; Con: Andrew Goodman (2/2) 7', 29'; Pen: Andrew Goodman (3/4) 4', 43', 74'; Cards: Liam Squire (yellow card) 35'	Report	Try: Aaron Cruden (2) 24', 77'; Doug Tietjens 63'; Con: Aaron Cruden (3/3) 25', 64', 78'; Pen: Aaron Cruden (2/4) 33', 40'; Cards: Francis Bryant (yellow card) 72'

Trafalgar Park, Nelson
Referee: Richard Kelly

26 August 2011
19:35 NZST

North Harbour	28–29	Wellington
Try: Chris Smylie 7'; David Raikuna (2) 26', 66'; James Parsons 36'; Con: Ben Botica (1/4) 8'; Pen: Ben Botica (2/2) 3', 19'	Report	Try: Hosea Gear 21'; Faifili Levave 56'; Con: Lima Sopoaga (2/2) 22', 57'; Pen: Lima Sopoaga (5/5) 13', 44', 46', 54', 71'

North Harbour Stadium, Albany
Referee: Shane McDermott

27 August 2011
14:35 NZST

Waikato	26–19	Auckland
Try: Trent Renata 12'; Jackson Willison 21'; Stephen Donald (2) 60', 79'; Con: Stephen Donald (1/1) 12'; Trent Renata (2/3) 22', 60'; Pen: Stephen Donald (0/1); Trent Renata (0/1); Cards: Stephen Donald (yellow card) 43'	Report	Try: George Moala 45'; Con: Gareth Anscombe (1/1) 46'; Pen: Gareth Anscombe (4/7) 10', 16', 37', 52'

Waikato Stadium, Hamilton
Referee: Keith Brown

27 August 2011
16:35 NZST

Counties Manukau	39–19	Northland
Try: Sherwin Stowers (3) 2', 61', 79'; Bundee Aki 6'; Ahsee Tuala 45'; Augustine Pulu 49'; Con: Baden Kerr (3/6) 7', 46', 49'; Pen: Baden Kerr (1/1) 23'	Report	Try: Bryce Heem 34'; Rhyan Caine 60'; Jack McPhee 67'; Con: Lachie Munro (2/3) 61', 68'

Bayer Growers Stadium, Pukekohe
Referee: Ben Skeen

27 August 2011
19:35 NZST

Otago	16–29	Canterbury
Try: Ben Smith 11'; Con: Glenn Dickson (1/1) 13'; Pen: Glenn Dickson (3/4) 23', 35', 43'	Report	Try: Tyler Bleyendaal 27'; Tom Taylor 57'; Robbie Fruean 74'; Con: Tyler Bleyendaal (1/3) 75'; Pen: Tyler Bleyendaal (4/4) 6', 38', 47', 52'

Forsyth Barr Stadium, Dunedin
Referee: Garratt Williamson

28 August 2011
14:35 NZST

Southland	17–29	Bay of Plenty
Try: Robbie Robinson 33'; John Hardie 60'; Cardiff Vaega 68'; Con: James Wilson (1/1) 34'; Marty McKenzie (0/2)	Report	Try: Phil Burleigh (2) 27', 47'; Ben Smith 39'; Sam Cane 64'; Con: Chris Noakes (3/4) 39', 48', 64'; Pen: Chris Noakes (1/1) 12'

Rugby Park Stadium, Invercargill
Referee: Vinny Munro

28 August 2011
16:35 NZST

RS – Taranaki	29–11	Hawke's Bay
Try: Frazier Climo 28'; Jayden Hayward 48'; Con: Beauden Barrett (2/2) 29', 49'; Pen: Beauden Barrett (5/5) 6', 19', 35', 63', 70'	Report	Try: Richard Buckman 60'; Con: Andrew Horrell (0/1); Pen: Andrew Horrell (2/2) 4', 42'

Yarrow Stadium, New Plymouth
Referee: Mike Fraser

=== Week 8 ===
30 August 2011
19:35 NZST

Otago	28–20	Manawatu
Try: Paul Grant 20'; Scott Manson 54'; Gareth Evans 62'; Buxton Popoali'i 70'; Con: Hayden Parker (0/2); Tony Brown (1/2) 63'; Pen: Hayden Parker (1/3) 8'; Tony Brown (1/1) 60'; Cards: Adam Hill (yellow card) 37'	Report	Try: Doug Tietjens 14'; Waisea Qiokata 77'; Con: Isaac Thompson (1/1) 15'; Aaron Cruden (1/1) 78'; Pen: Isaac Thompson (2/2) 11', 34'

Forsyth Barr Stadium, Dunedin
Referee: Vinny Munro

Bye/s: Auckland, Bay of Plenty, Canterbury, Counties Manukau, Hawke's Bay, North Harbour, Northland, Southland, Taranaki, Tasman, Waikato, and Wellington

== Play-offs ==
=== Championship ===
4 September 2011
17:35 NZST

Manawatu	30–35	Hawke's Bay
Try: Tietjens 13' c Bryant 38' c Fitzgerald 70' c Con: Cruden (3/3) 14', 39', 71'; Pen: Cruden (3/3) 3', 46', 50'	Report	Try: Saseve 10' c Buckman 27' c Nemani 31' m Sinoti 47' c Con: Horrell (3/4) 11', 28', 48'; Pen: Horrell (3/3) 34', 54', 57'

Arena Manawatu, Palmerston North
Referee: Glen Jackson

=== Premiership ===
3 September 2011
19:35 NZST

Waikato	3–12	Canterbury
Pen: Donald (1/1) 11'	Report	Pen: Taylor (4/4) 25', 34', 39', 75'; Bleyendaal (0/1)

Waikato Stadium, Hamilton
Referee: Garratt Williamson

FB	15	Trent Renata
RW	14	Henry Speight
OC	13	Jackson Willison
IC	12	Sam Christie
LW	11	Tim Mikkelson
FH	10	Stephen Donald
SH	9	Tawera Kerr-Barlow
N8	8	Alex Bradley
OF	7	Marty Holah
BF	6	Liam Messam
RL	5	Romana Graham
LL	4	Toby Lynn
TP	3	Nathan White (c)
HK	2	Marcel Cummings-Toone
LP	1	Toby Smith
Replacements:
HK	16	Vance Elliott
PR	17	Ben May
LK	18	Matt Vant Leven
FL	19	Zak Hohneck
SH	20	Brendon Leonard
WG	21	Sitiveni Sivivatu
WG	22	Declan O'Donnell
PR	23	Ted Tauroa

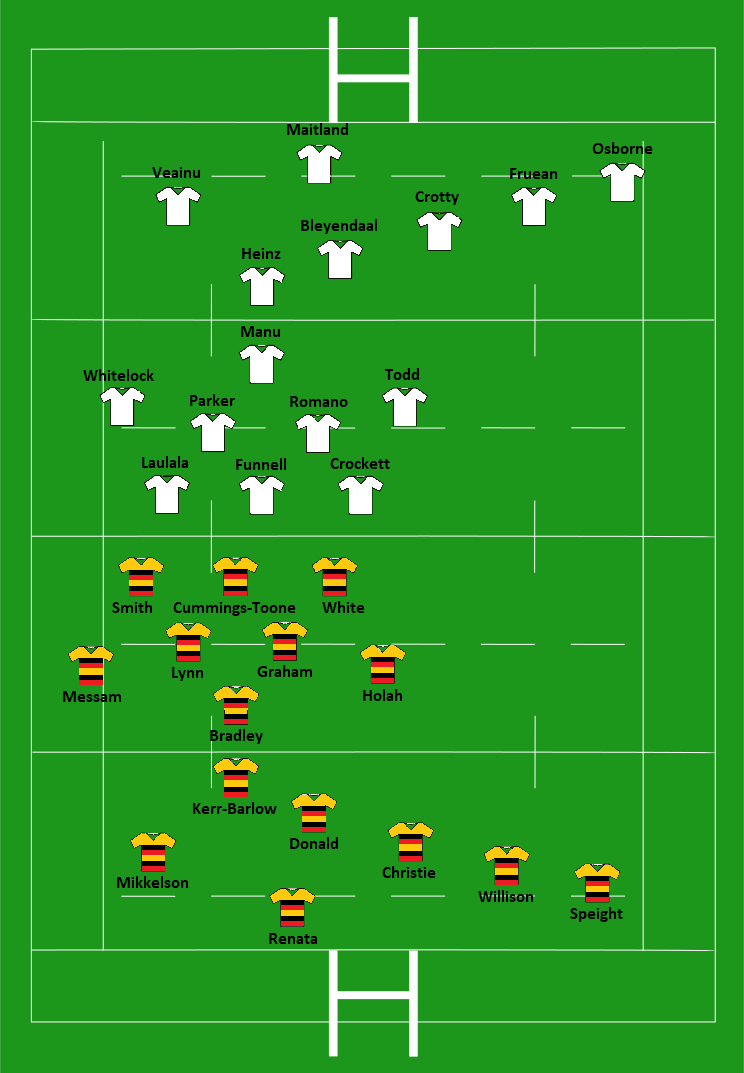

FB	15	Sean Maitland
RW	14	Telusa Veainu
OC	13	Robbie Fruean
IC	12	Ryan Crotty
LW	11	Patrick Osborne
FH	10	Tyler Bleyendaal
SH	9	Willi Heinz
N8	8	Nasi Manu
OF	7	Matt Todd
BF	6	George Whitelock (c)
RL	5	Ash Parker
LL	4	Luke Romano
TP	3	Nepo Laulala
HK	2	Ben Funnell
LP	1	Wyatt Crockett
Replacements:
HK	16	Paul Ngauamo
PR	17	Joe Moody
LK	18	Luke Katene
FL	19	Brendon O'Connor
SH	20	Takerei Norton
FH	21	Tom Taylor
WG	22	Johnny McNicholl
PR	23	Andrew Olorenshaw

== Statistics ==
=== Leading point scorers ===
No.	Player	Team	Points	Average	Details
1	Andrew Horrell	Hawke's Bay	152	15.20	4 T, 24 C, 28 P, 0 D
2	Aaron Cruden	Manawatu	140	12.73	4 T, 27 C, 21 P, 1 D
3	Gareth Anscombe	Auckland	125	12.50	2 T, 17 C, 27 P, 0 D
4	Andrew Goodman	Tasman	116	11.60	3 T, 13 C, 25 P, 0 D
5	Lachie Munro	Northland	112	11.20	2 T, 21 C, 20 P, 0 D
6	Glenn Dickson	Otago	102	11.33	1 T, 11 C, 25 P, 0 D
7	Lima Sopoaga	Wellington	98	9.80	0 T, 22 C, 18 P, 0 D
8	Ben Botica	North Harbour	96	9.60	1 T, 20 C, 17 P, 0 D
9	Beauden Barrett	Taranaki	90	11.25	0 T, 9 C, 24 P, 0 D
10	Chris Noakes	Bay of Plenty	87	8.70	0 T, 15 C, 18 P, 1 D

Source: The weekly reviews of the matches published on provincial.rugby (see "Report" in the individual match scoring stats).

=== Leading try scorers ===
No.	Player	Team	Tries	Average
1	Sherwin Stowers	Counties Manukau	9	0.90
2	Mat Luamanu	North Harbour	8	0.80
3	Toby Arnold	Bay of Plenty	6	0.60
4	Jayden Hayward	Taranaki	6	0.60
5	Lelia Masaga	Bay of Plenty	5	0.56
6	Mark Bright	Tasman	5	0.50
7	David Raikuna	North Harbour	5	0.50
8	Robbie Fruean	Canterbury	5	0.45
9	Aaron Smith	Manawatu	5	0.45
10	Asaeli Tikoirotuma	Manawatu	5	0.45

Source: The weekly reviews of the matches published on provincial.rugby (see "Report" in the individual match scoring stats).

=== Points by week ===
Team	1		2		3		4		5		6		7		8		Total		Average	
Auckland	33	40	46	49	11	39	68	39	25	22	53	46	19	26	0	0	255	261	25.50	26.10
Bay of Plenty	20	13	38	17	68	8	23	30	46	71	16	25	64	48	0	0	275	212	27.50	21.20
Canterbury	40	33	19	22	70	52	36	32	41	40	27	0	60	51	0	0	293	230	29.30	23.00
Counties Manukau	13	20	64	48	14	22	29	52	22	25	54	76	39	19	0	0	235	262	23.50	26.20
Hawke's Bay	23	32	56	31	39	10	59	41	32	13	44	14	45	72	0	0	298	213	29.80	21.30
Manawatu	32	23	55	54	15	42	47	31	31	25	54	20	27	23	20	28	281	246	28.10	24.60
North Harbour	29	46	56	53	10	39	34	61	23	25	65	66	28	29	0	0	245	319	24.50	31.90
Northland	19	9	22	30	36	40	30	23	32	71	26	33	62	73	0	0	227	279	22.70	27.90
Otago	46	29	45	52	17	20	42	33	10	25	19	16	16	29	28	20	223	224	22.30	22.40
Southland	9	19	40	48	22	14	45	51	25	23	25	30	29	44	0	0	195	229	19.50	22.90
Taranaki	5	23	30	23	62	27	10	15	65	56	0	27	44	23	0	0	216	194	21.60	19.40
Tasman	9	19	38	71	6	35	53	55	23	26	46	47	23	27	0	0	198	280	19.80	28.00
Waikato	19	9	23	30	43	42	22	15	52	23	20	54	57	46	0	0	236	219	23.60	21.90
Wellington	23	5	17	21	37	60	20	40	68	50	30	25	56	59	0	0	251	260	25.10	26.00

Source: ITM Cup Fixtures and Results 2011

=== Tries by week ===
Team	1		2		3		4		5		6		7		8		Total		Average	
Auckland	3	4	5	5	1	5	9	5	1	1	6	4	1	4	0	0	26	28	2.60	2.80
Bay of Plenty	2	1	4	2	8	1	3	3	5	6	1	3	6	7	0	0	29	23	2.90	2.30
Canterbury	4	3	2	1	10	6	5	5	5	5	4	0	7	3	0	0	37	23	3.70	2.30
Counties Manukau	1	2	6	5	1	1	1	3	1	1	7	10	6	3	0	0	23	25	2.30	2.50
Hawke's Bay	2	4	5	3	5	1	8	4	4	1	6	2	4	9	0	0	34	24	3.40	2.40
Manawatu	4	2	7	5	2	6	6	3	3	3	6	2	3	2	2	4	33	27	3.30	2.70
North Harbour	4	6	7	6	1	5	3	8	2	3	7	7	4	2	0	0	28	37	2.80	3.70
Northland	3	0	3	4	3	5	3	3	2	10	2	3	9	9	0	0	25	34	2.50	3.40
Otago	6	4	4	6	2	2	2	4	1	4	1	1	1	3	4	2	21	26	2.10	2.60
Southland	0	1	3	4	1	1	7	5	3	2	4	3	3	4	0	0	21	20	2.10	2.00
Taranaki	1	3	4	2	8	2	1	2	4	6	0	4	3	1	0	0	21	20	2.10	2.00
Tasman	0	3	4	9	0	4	7	7	2	2	4	4	2	3	0	0	19	32	1.90	3.20
Waikato	1	0	2	4	5	4	1	0	8	2	2	6	7	4	0	0	26	20	2.60	2.00
Wellington	3	1	2	2	4	8	2	6	9	4	3	4	5	7	0	0	28	32	2.80	3.20

For	Against

Source: The weekly reviews of the matches published on provincial.rugby (see "Report" in the individual match scoring stats).

=== Sanctions ===
Player	Team	Red	Yellow	Sent off match(es):
Aaron Smith	Manawatu	0	1	vs Counties Manukau
Halani Aulika	Otago	0	1	vs Auckland
Anthony Perenise	Hawke's Bay	0	1	vs Tasman
Ash Moeke	Northland	0	1	vs Bay of Plenty
Chris King	Southland	0	1	vs Otago
James McGougan	Otago	0	1	vs Southland
Sam Cane	Bay of Plenty	0	1	vs Taranaki
Scott Waldrom	Taranaki	0	1	vs Bay of Plenty
Simon Lemalu	Counties Manukau	0	1	vs Auckland
Jeremy Thrush	Wellington	0	1	vs Manawatu
TJ Ioane	Otago	0	1	vs Tasman
Scott Fuglistaller	Wellington	0	1	vs Waikato
Liam Squire	Tasman	0	1	vs Manawatu
Francis Bryant	Manawatu	0	1	vs Tasman
Stephen Donald	Waikato	0	1	vs Auckland
Adam Hill	Otago	0	1	vs Manawatu

== Ranfurly Shield ==
=== Pre-season challenges ===
2 July 2011
14:35 NZST

Canterbury	52–8	North Otago
Try: McNicholl (2) 24' m, 80' c Parker 33' c O'Connor 35' c Heinz 38' c Hifo 43' c Osborne 50' m Taylor 60" c Con: Taylor (6/8) 34', 36', 39', 44', 61', 80'	Preview; Report	Try: Mafileo 74' m Con: Patston (0/1); Pen: Patston (1/1) 40'

Lancaster Park, Christchurch
Attendance: 3,000
Referee: Mike Fraser

== See also ==
- 2011 Heartland Championship
