= 2012 Chiefs (Super Rugby) season =

Chiefs
- 2012 season
- Head coach: Dave Rennie
- Captains: Craig Clarke; Liam Messam
- Stadium: Waikato Stadium, Hamilton; Baypark Stadium, Mount Maunganui; ECOLight Stadium, Pukekohe
- Overall Competition: 2nd
- N.Z. Conference: 1st
- Play-offs: Champions
- Record: Won 14, Lost 4
- Top try scorer: All: Sona Taumalolo (9)
- Top points scorer: All: Aaron Cruden (251)

In 2012, following the disappointing results of previous years, the Chiefs underwent a significant change in personnel. This included the recruitment of new coaches, including Dave Rennie and Wayne Smith, and players, including Aaron Cruden, Ben Tameifuna, Brodie Retallick and Sonny Bill Williams. The changes had an immediate impact as the Chiefs finished at the top of the New Zealand conference, qualifying for a home semi-final, which they won, defeating the Crusaders 20–17. They subsequently hosted the final for the first time in the teams's history, comprehensively defeating the Sharks by 37–6, claiming their first title. They also set many club records in the 2012 season, including: most home wins, best home streak, best season winning streak, and most points and tries scored.

== Standings ==
The final standings of the 2012 Super Rugby season were:

New Zealand Conference
Pos	Team	Rnd	W	D	L	Bye	PF	PA	PD	TF	TA	TB	LB	Pts
1	Chiefs	18	12	0	4	2	444	358	+86	47	30	5	3	64
2	Crusaders	18	11	0	5	2	485	343	+142	47	34	5	4	61
3	Hurricanes	18	10	0	6	2	489	429	+60	58	39	8	1	57
4	Highlanders	18	9	0	7	2	359	385	-26	36	31	2	4	50
5	Blues	18	4	0	12	2	359	430	-71	34	50	2	6	32

Overall Standings
Pos	Team	Rnd	W	D	L	Bye	PF	PA	PD	TF	TA	TB	LB	Pts
1	(South Africa) Stormers	18	14	0	2	2	350	254	+96	28	21	0	2	66
2	(New Zealand) Chiefs	18	12	0	4	2	444	358	+86	47	30	5	3	64
3	(Australia) Reds	18	11	0	5	2	359	347	+12	38	36	4	2	58
4	(New Zealand) Crusaders	18	11	0	5	2	485	343	+142	47	34	5	4	61
5	(South Africa) Bulls	18	10	0	6	2	472	369	+103	50	38	6	5	59
6	(South Africa) Sharks	18	10	0	6	2	436	348	+88	47	31	7	4	59
7	(Australia) Brumbies	18	10	0	6	2	404	331	+73	41	31	5	5	58
8	(New Zealand) Hurricanes	18	10	0	6	2	489	429	+60	58	39	8	1	57
9	(New Zealand) Highlanders	18	9	0	7	2	359	385	-26	36	31	2	4	50
10	(South Africa) Cheetahs	18	5	0	11	2	391	458	-67	35	47	3	7	38
11	(Australia) Waratahs	18	4	0	12	2	346	407	-61	33	43	3	8	35
12	(New Zealand) Blues	18	4	0	12	2	359	430	-71	34	50	2	6	32
13	(Australia) Rebels	18	4	0	12	2	362	520	-158	37	59	3	5	32
14	(Australia) Force	18	3	0	13	2	306	440	-134	30	49	2	5	27
15	(South Africa) Lions	18	3	0	13	2	317	460	-143	30	52	2	3	25

== Results ==
The results of the Chiefs during the 2012 Super Rugby season were:

Round 1	25 February 2012	Chiefs	19–23	Highlanders	Waikato Stadium, Hamilton
	19:35	Try: Lelia Masaga 14'; Con: Aaron Cruden 15' (1/1); Pen: Aaron Cruden 5', 32', 37', 50' (4/4)	Scoreboard	Try: Aaron Smith 61'; Phil Burleigh 65'; Con: Chris Noakes 62', 66' (2/2); Pen: Chris Noakes 2', 12', 27' (3/3)	Attendance: 12,058; Referee: Jonathon White

Round 2	2 March 2012	Chiefs	29–14	Blues	Waikato Stadium, Hamilton
	19:35	Try: Sona Taumalolo 4'; Asaeli Tikoirotuma 23'; Tawera Kerr-Barlow 30'; Tim Nanai-Williams 34'; Con: Aaron Cruden 5', 24', 31' (3/4); Pen: Aaron Cruden 8' (1/2)	Scoreboard	Try: Sherwin Stowers 77'; Con: Gareth Anscombe (0/1); Pen: Michael Hobbs 15', 22', 55' (3/5); Drop: Michael Hobbs (0/1)	Attendance: 12,133; Referee: Keith Brown

Round 3	9 March 2012	Crusaders	19–24	Chiefs	McLean Park, Napier
	19:35	Try: Robert Fruean 49'; Con: Tyler Bleyendaal 50' (1/1); Pen: Tyler Bleyendaal 9', 35', 61', 64' (4/5)	Scoreboard	Try: Liam Messam 26'; Sona Taumalolo 57'; Con: Aaron Cruden 27' (1/2); Pen: Aaron Cruden 2', 22', 38', 77' (4/7)	Attendance: 12,500; Referee: Garratt Williamson

Round 4	16 March 2012	Chiefs	29–22	Brumbies	Baypark Stadium, Mount Maunganui
	19:35	Try: Sona Taumalolo 68'; Jackson Willison 79'; Con: Aaron Cruden 69', 80' (2/2); Pen: Aaron Cruden 10', 14', 27', 49', 55' (5/5)	Scoreboard	Try: Sam Carter 75'; Con: Christian Lealiifano (1/1); Pen: Christian Lealiifano 4', 21', 35', 45', 64' (5/6)	Attendance: 12,238; Referee: Ian Smith

Round 6	31 March 2012	Chiefs	30–13	Waratahs	Waikato Stadium, Hamilton
	19:35	Try: Robbie Robinson 9'; Sona Taumalolo 42'; Liam Messam 64'; Con: Aaron Cruden 10', 43', 65' (3/3); Pen: Aaron Cruden 31', 35', 62' (3/3)	Scoreboard	Try: Tom Kingston 5'; Con: Brendan McKibbin 6' (1/1); Pen: Brendan McKibbin 25', 48' (2/3)	Attendance: 11,643; Referee: Mike Fraser

Round 7	6 April 2012	Force	12–20	Chiefs	{{{s}}}, [[{{{slan}}}]]
	19:40	Pen: David Harvey 9', 21', 51', 57' (4/5)	Scoreboard	Try: Lelia Masaga 15'; Tim Nanai-Williams 48'; Con: Aaron Cruden 16', 49' (2/2); Pen: Aaron Cruden 53', 69' (2/3)	Attendance: 17,112; Referee: Jonathon White

Round 8	14 April 2012	Cheetahs	33–39	Chiefs	Free State Stadium, Bloemfontein
	17:05	Try: Ashley Johnson 52'; Johan Goosen 78'; Con: Johan Goosen 53' (1/2); Pen: Sias Ebersohn 6', 24', 40', 50' (4/4); Johan Goosen 56', 62', 83' (3/3); Drop: Sias Ebersohn (0/0)	Scoreboard	Try: Lelia Masaga 20'; Sona Taumalolo 47', 67'; Sonny Bill Williams 72'; Richard Kahui 74'; Con: Aaron Cruden 21', 48', 73', 75' (4/5); Pen: Aaron Cruden 9', 59' (2/2)	Attendance: 17,163; Referee: Jonathan Kaplan

Round 9	21 April 2012	Sharks	12–18	Chiefs	Mr Price Kings Park, Durban
	17:05	Pen: Patrick Lambie 40', 48', 52', 67' (4/5)	Scoreboard	Try: Aaron Cruden 19'; Augustine Pulu 81'; Con: Aaron Cruden 20' (1/2); Pen: Aaron Cruden 30', 62' (2/3)	Attendance: 26,773; Referee: Garratt Williamson

Round 10	28 April 2012	Chiefs	33–14	Hurricanes	Waikato Stadium, Hamilton
	19:35	Try: Lelia Masaga 45'; Sona Taumalolo 65'; Toby Smith 76'; Con: Aaron Cruden 46', 66', 77' (3/3); Pen: Aaron Cruden 5', 15', 25', 28' (4/5)	Scoreboard	Try: Andre Taylor 35'; Con: Beauden Barrett (0/1); Pen: Beauden Barrett 19', 49', 57' (3/4); Drop: Beauden Barrett (0/1)	Attendance: 22,119; Referee: Jonathon White

Round 11	5 May 2012	Chiefs	34–21	Lions	ECOLight Stadium, Pukekohe
	19:35	Try: Aaron Cruden 19'; Craig Clarke 28'; Lelia Masaga 49'; Brendon Leonard 56'; Con: Aaron Cruden 20', 29', 50', 57' (4/4); Pen: Aaron Cruden 4', 15' (2/2)	Scoreboard	Try: Cobus Grobbelaar 34', 68'; Josh Strauss 53'; Con: Elton Jantjies 35', 54', 69' (3/3)	Attendance: 12,364; Referee: Ian Smith

Round 12	13 May 2012	Reds	42–27	Chiefs	Suncorp Stadium, Brisbane
	16:10	Try: Dom Shipperley 4'; Ben Lucas 40'; Scott Higginbotham 42'; Will Genia 47'; Saia Fainga'a 51'; Con: Mike Harris 40', 43', 48', 52' (4/5); Pen: Mike Harris 20', 76' (2/2); Drop: Mike Harris 64' (1/1)	Scoreboard	Try: Sonny Bill Williams 30'; Liam Messam 33'; Sona Taumalolo 38'; Asaeli Tikoirotuma 59'; Con: Aaron Cruden 31', 34' (2/4); Pen: Aaron Cruden 16' (1/1)	Attendance: 36,479; Referee: Marius Jonker

Round 14	25 May 2012	Chiefs	28–22	Bulls	Waikato Stadium, Hamilton
	19:35	Try: Andrew Horrell 24'; Asaeli Tikoirotuma 58'; Sam Cane 69'; Con: Aaron Cruden 59', 70' (2/3); Pen: Aaron Cruden 15', 46', 53' (3/3)	Scoreboard	Try: Bjorn Basson 40'; Con: Morné Steyn 40' (1/1); Pen: Morné Steyn 7', 35', 50', 62' (4/4); Drop: Morné Steyn 23' (1/2)	Attendance: 18,482; Referee: Mark Lawrence

Round 15	2 June 2012	Blues	34–41	Chiefs	North Harbour Stadium, Albany
	19:35	Try: Francis Saili 13'; Lachie Munro 39'; Rudi Wulf 62'; Rene Ranger 65'; Con: Lachie Munro 14', 40', 63', 66' (4/4); Pen: Lachie Munro 29', 37' (2/2); Cards: Steven Luatua (yellow card) 34' to 44'	Scoreboard	Try: Asaeli Tikoirotuma 15', 45', 55', 70'; Sonny Bill Williams 31'; Con: Aaron Cruden 16', 32', 46', 56', 71' (5/5); Pen: Aaron Cruden 4', 27' (2/3); Cards: Maritino Nemani (yellow card) 33' to 44'; Michael Fitzgerald (yellow card) 59' to 69'	Attendance: 20,200; Referee: Chris Pollock

Round 16	29 June 2012	Highlanders	21–27	Chiefs	Forsyth Barr Stadium, Dunedin
	19:35	Try: Andrew Hore 46'; Hosea Gear 75'; Con: Chris Noakes (0/1); Mike Delany 76' (1/1); Pen: Chris Noakes 8', 19', 30' (3/5)	Scoreboard	Try: Tim Nanai-Williams 2'; Robbie Robinson 38'; Con: Aaron Cruden 3' (1/2); Pen: Aaron Cruden 12', 40', 41', 64', 68' (5/6)	Attendance: 17,401; Referee: Garratt Williamson

Round 17	6 July 2012	Chiefs	21–28	Crusaders	Waikato Stadium, Hamilton
	19:35	Try: Brodie Retallick 30'; Sonny Bill Williams 55'; Con: Aaron Cruden 31' (1/2); Pen: Aaron Cruden 3', 16', 37' (3/4)	Scoreboard	Try: Kieran Read 10'; Luke Romano 21'; Andrew Ellis 52'; Con: Dan Carter 11', 22' (2/3); Pen: Dan Carter 7' (1/3); Drop: Dan Carter 17' (1/1)	Attendance: 25,100; Referee: Steve Walsh

Round 18	13 July 2012	Hurricanes	28–25	Chiefs	Westpac Stadium, Wellington
	19:35	Try: Julian Savea 12', 24'; Dane Coles 85'; Con: Beauden Barrett 25', 86' (2/3); Pen: Beauden Barrett 7', 40', 62' (3/6); Cards: Ben May (yellow card) 28' to 39'	Scoreboard	Try: Tawera Kerr-Barlow 3'; Ben Tameifuna 38'; Aaron Cruden 57'; Con: Aaron Cruden 4', 58' (2/3); Pen: Aaron Cruden 32', 66' (2/4)	Attendance: 23,549; Referee: Jonathan Kaplan

Semi-Final	27 July 2012	Chiefs	20–17	Crusaders	Waikato Stadium, Hamilton
	19:35	Try: Sona Taumalolo 26'; Liam Messam 33'; Con: Aaron Cruden 27', 35' (2/2); Pen: Aaron Cruden 3', 50' (2/5)	Scoreboard	Try: Ryan Crotty 40'; Con: Dan Carter (0/1); Pen: Dan Carter 15', 32', 45', 62' (4/5)	Attendance: 25,100; Referee: Craig Joubert

Final	4 August 2012	Chiefs	37–6	Sharks	Waikato Stadium, Hamilton
	19:35	Try: Tim Nanai-Williams 19'; Kane Thompson 46'; Lelia Masaga 61'; Sonny Bill Williams 77'; Con: Aaron Cruden 20', 47', 62', 78' (4/4); Pen: Aaron Cruden 25', 34', 72' (3/5)	Scoreboard	Pen: Frédéric Michalak 6', 52' (2/2)	Attendance: 25,100; Referee: Steve Walsh

== Squad ==
The Chiefs squad for the 2012 Super Rugby season were:

2013 Chiefs squad
**Props**: (New Zealand) **Ben Afeaki**; (New Zealand) Shane Cleaver; (New Zealand) Josh Hohneck; (Australia) **Toby Smith**; (New Zealand) Ben Tameifuna; (Tonga) **Sona Taumalolo**; **Hookers**: (New Zealand) Marcel Cummings-Toone; (New Zealand) **Hika Elliot**; (Samoa) **Mahonri Schwalger**; **Locks**: (New Zealand) Craig Clarke (c); (New Zealand) Michael Fitzgerald; (New Zealand) Romana Graham; (New Zealand) **Brodie Retallick**; (New Zealand) **Kane Thompson**	**Loose forwards**: (New Zealand) Alex Bradley; (New Zealand) **Sam Cane**; (New Zealand) **Tanerau Latimer**; (Samoa) Fritz Lee; (New Zealand) **Liam Messam** (c); (New Zealand) Scott Waldrom; **Scrum-halves**: (Australia) **Tawera Kerr-Barlow**; (New Zealand) **Brendon Leonard**; (New Zealand) **Augustine Pulu**; **Fly-halves**: (New Zealand) **Aaron Cruden**; (New Zealand) Andrew Horrell	**Midfield**: (New Zealand) **Richard Kahui**; (Fiji) **Asaeli Tikoirotuma**; (New Zealand) **Sonny Bill Williams**; (New Zealand) Jackson Willison; **Wingers**: (New Zealand) **Lelia Masaga**; (New Zealand) **Tim Nanai-Williams**; (Fiji) Maritino Nemani; (New Zealand) Declan O'Donnell; **Fullbacks**: (New Zealand) Robbie Robinson
(c) denotes team captain, **Bold** denotes player is internationally capped.

== Player statistics ==
The Chiefs players' appearance and scoring statistics for the 2012 Super Rugby season are:

Player	Apps	Tries	Cons	Pens	DGs	Pts	YC	RC
Ben Afeaki	5	-	-	-	-	-	-	-
Alex Bradley	6	-	-	-	-	-	-	-
Sam Cane	18	1	-	-	-	5	-	-
Craig Clarke	16	1	-	-	-	5	-	-
Shane Cleaver	2	-	-	-	-	-	-	-
Aaron Cruden	18	3	43	50	-	251	-	-
Marcel Cummings-Toone	0	-	-	-	-	-	-	-
Hika Elliot	16	-	-	-	-	-	-	-
Michael Fitzgerald	12	-	-	-	-	-	1	-
Romana Graham	2	-	-	-	-	-	-	-
Josh Hohneck	5	-	-	-	-	-	-	-
Andrew Horrell	14	1	-	-	-	5	-	-
Richard Kahui	11	1	-	-	-	5	-	-
Tawera Kerr-Barlow	16	2	-	-	-	10	-	-
Tanerau Latimer	17	-	-	-	-	-	-	-
Fritz Lee	2	-	-	-	-	-	-	-
Brendon Leonard	8	1	-	-	-	5	-	-
Lelia Masaga	13	6	-	-	-	30	-	-
Liam Messam	17	4	-	-	-	20	-	-
Tim Nanai-Williams	13	4	-	-	-	20	-	-
Maritino Nemani	4	-	-	-	-	-	1	-
Declan O'Donnell	1	-	-	-	-	-	-	-
Augustine Pulu	8	1	-	-	-	5	-	-
Brodie Retallick	17	1	-	-	-	5	-	-
Robbie Robinson	15	2	-	-	-	10	-	-
Mahonri Schwalger	18	-	-	-	-	-	-	-
Toby Smith	8	1	-	-	-	5	-	-
Ben Tameifuna	16	1	-	-	-	5	-	-
Sona Taumalolo	18	9	-	-	-	45	-	-
Kane Thompson	13	1	-	-	-	5	-	-
Asaeli Tikoirotuma	15	7	-	-	-	35	-	-
Scott Waldrom	3	-	-	-	-	-	-	-
Sonny Bill Williams	18	5	-	-	-	25	-	-
Jackson Willison	13	1	-	-	-	5	-	-
Total	18	53	43	50	-	501	2	-
