= 2013 Super Rugby final =

Men's rugby union club competition

2013 Super Rugby Final
- Event: 2013 Super Rugby season
| Chiefs | Brumbies |
| (New Zealand) | (Australia) |
| 27 | 22 |
- Date: 3 August 2013
- Venue: Waikato Stadium, Hamilton
- Referee: Craig Joubert (South Africa)

The 2013 Super Rugby final was contested on 3 August 2013 by the Canberra-based Brumbies and Hamilton-based Chiefs. The Chiefs won 27–22 to give them their second consecutive Super Rugby title. The match was the last of the 2013 Super Rugby season, and was hosted by the Chiefs at Waikato Stadium. It was the eighteenth final in the history of the Southern Hemisphere's premier domestic rugby competition, and the third under the expanded fifteen-team format. The Chiefs had qualified highest during the regular season, while the Brumbies qualified third.

The Chiefs directly qualified for their semi-final, where they beat fellow New Zealand team the Crusaders 20–19. The Brumbies defeated the Cheetahs in a close qualifying final, and then travelled to Pretoria where they beat the Bulls in their semi-final. The Chiefs hosted the final after qualifying higher than the Brumbies, who had to travel back from South Africa for the match.

The Brumbies led early in the final, and were ahead 16–9 at half-time following a converted try and three penalties from inside-centre Christian Lealiifano. After penalties were exchanged early in the second half, the Brumbies were ahead 22–12, before the Chiefs scored two tries and a penalty to take the lead 27–22 with seven minutes remaining. The Brumbies were unable to score further, and the Chiefs went on to win.

== Road to the final ==
Overall Standings
| Pos | Team | W | D | L | PD | TB | LB | Pts |
| 1 | (New Zealand) Chiefs | 12 | 0 | 4 | +94 | 8 | 2 | 66 |
| 2 | (South Africa) Bulls | 12 | 0 | 4 | +118 | 5 | 2 | 63 |
| 3 | (Australia) Brumbies | 10 | 2 | 4 | +135 | 5 | 3 | 60 |
| 4 | (New Zealand) Crusaders | 11 | 0 | 5 | +139 | 5 | 3 | 60 |
| 5 | (Australia) Reds | 10 | 2 | 4 | +25 | 4 | 2 | 58 |
| 6 | (South Africa) Cheetahs | 10 | 0 | 6 | +24 | 2 | 4 | 54 |
| 7 | (South Africa) Stormers | 9 | 0 | 7 | +54 | 1 | 5 | 50 |
| 8 | (South Africa) Sharks | 8 | 0 | 8 | +79 | 3 | 5 | 48 |
| 9 | (Australia) Waratahs | 8 | 0 | 8 | +40 | 1 | 4 | 45 |
| 10 | (New Zealand) Blues | 6 | 0 | 10 | −17 | 6 | 6 | 44 |
| 11 | (New Zealand) Hurricanes | 6 | 0 | 10 | −71 | 4 | 5 | 41 |
| 12 | (Australia) Rebels | 5 | 0 | 11 | −133 | 4 | 5 | 37 |
| 13 | (Australia) Force | 4 | 1 | 11 | −99 | 0 | 5 | 31 |
| 14 | (New Zealand) Highlanders | 3 | 0 | 13 | −122 | 4 | 5 | 29 |
| 15 | (South Africa) Southern Kings | 3 | 1 | 12 | −266 | 2 | 0 | 24 |

The 2013 Super Rugby competition involved fifteen teams, five each from South Africa, Australia and New Zealand. 2013 marked the eighteenth season of the competition and the third in the expanded fifteen team format: twelve teams competed between 1996 and 2005, before increasing to fourteen between 2006 and 2010. The competition began on 24 February with the regular season consisting of 120 matches over twenty one weeks. Each team played teams from their own country twice (home and away) and four teams from each of the other two countries once (two at home and two away). The top six teams after the regular season advanced to the finals.

The Chiefs qualified top of the table after the regular season, and played the Crusaders in their semi-final where they won 20–19. The win also guaranteed the side would host the final, regardless of their opposition. The Brumbies finished third on the overall table, and top of the Australian Conference after the regular season. They hosted the Cheetahs in their qualifying final, who they defeated 15–13 in Canberra. They then travelled to Pretoria where they faced the Bulls in their semi-final. The match was won 26–23 after a late try.

The Chiefs went into the final with twelve wins and four losses whereas the Brumbies went in with ten wins, four losses and two draws. The Chiefs and the Brumbies did not meet during the conference round. They had last met at Mount Maunganui in round four of the 2012 season where the Brumbies were beaten 29–22 by the Chiefs.

The Chiefs were looking to be the fourth team to defend the title back to back since the Blues (1996 and 1997), Crusaders who defended it three years in a row (1998, 1999 and 2000) and the Bulls (2009 and 2010). The Brumbies were hoping to win the title for the third time which would put them equal second all-time with the Blues and Bulls with three Super Rugby titles.

First round
20 July 2013
4 | (New Zealand) Crusaders | 38
5 | (Australia) Reds | 9
21 July 2013
3 | (Australia) Brumbies | 15
6 | (South Africa) Cheetahs | 13

Semifinals
27 July 2013
1 | (New Zealand) Chiefs | 20
4 | (New Zealand) Crusaders | 19
27 July 2013
2 | (South Africa) Bulls | 23
3 | (Australia) Brumbies | 26

Final
3 August 2013
(New Zealand) Chiefs | 27
(Australia) Brumbies | 22

== Match ==
=== Summary ===
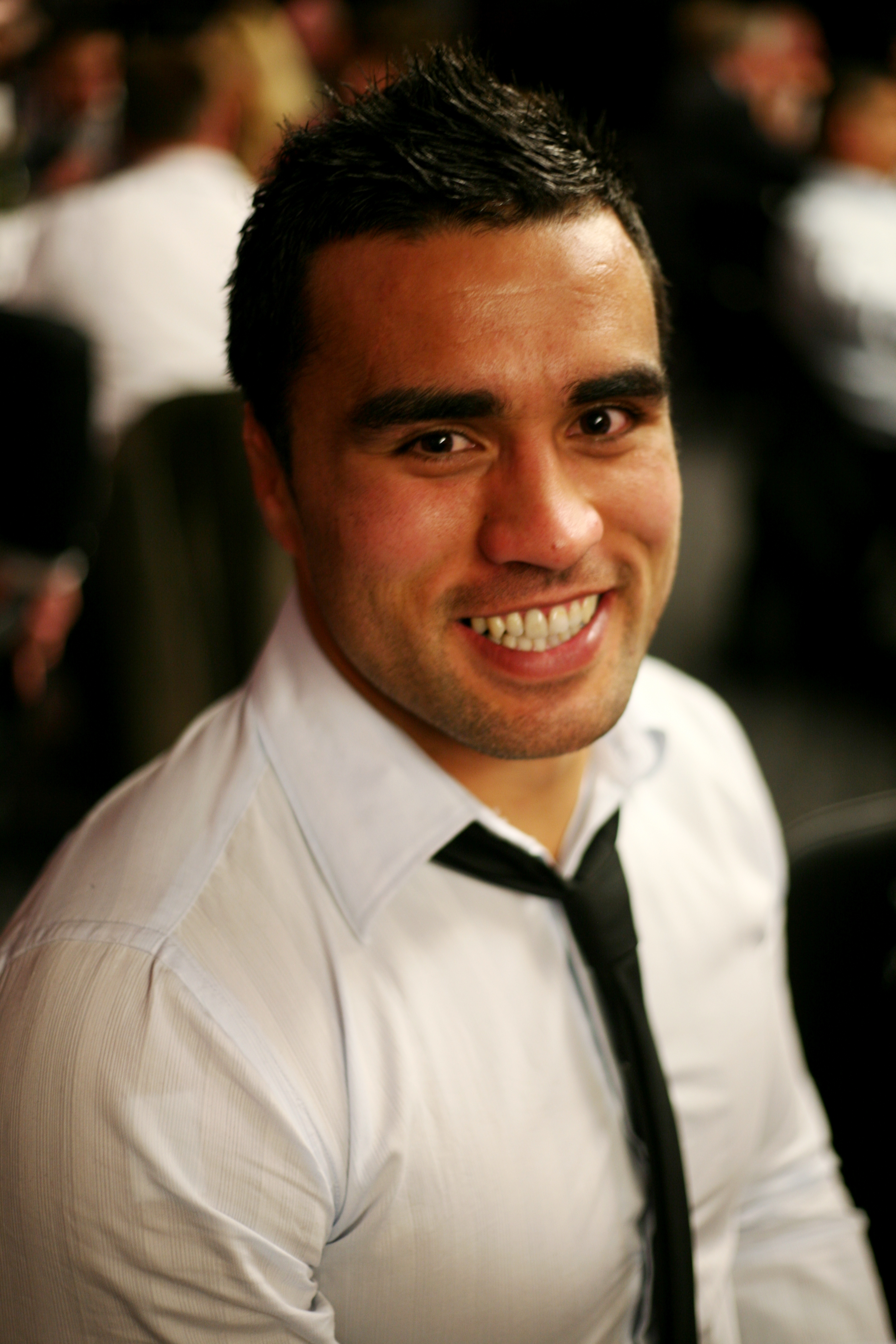
Chiefs flanker Liam Messam was awarded man-of-the-match for the final

The Brumbies dominated the scoring early in the match, with their inside-centre Christian Lealiifano scoring three early penalties to give his team a 9–0 lead after 20 minutes. The Chiefs responded with three penalties of their own, all scored by Aaron Cruden, to level the scores 9–9 after 32 minutes. The Brumbies were played a territory-based strategy, and were the first team to score a try, when after 35 minutes, Chiefs' scrum-half Tawera Kerr-Barlow threw an errant pass following being pressured by Brumbies' flanker George Smith; the resulting pass was intercepted by Lealiifano who ran 40 metres (130 ft) to score. The try was converted and the Brumbies led 16–9 at half-time.

The Brumbies were awarded a penalty at the 45-minute mark, which they converted to lead 19–9. The Chiefs responded with a penalty three minutes later, but missed another penalty opportunity soon after. When the Brumbies won possession at the break-down, a grubber kick was recovered by Brumbies' wing Clyde Rathbone, who was stopped with a try-saving tackle from Cruden. From the resulting play the Brumbies attacked the Chiefs try-line, and the Television Match Official was asked to adjudicate whether the Brumbies had forced the ball over the line, but the result was inconclusive and a try was not awarded. The Brumbies were awarded another penalty which they converted to leave the scores 22–12 after sixty minutes. Following a sustained attack, and having the ball held up over the try-line, the Chiefs were awarded a scrum five-metres from the Brumbies' line. Chiefs' flanker Liam Messam scored from the resulting scrum, and the try was unconverted to narrow the Brumbies' lead to 22–17. After attacking from their own half, Chiefs' substitute Robbie Robinson ran through a gap in the Brumbies' defence to score a try, which was converted by Cruden to give the Chiefs the lead 24–22 after 72 minutes. Two minutes later the Chiefs were awarded a penalty which they kicked to give them a five-point lead. The Brumbies attacked throughout the remainder of the match, but the Chiefs' defence held, and the match finished 27–22 to the Chiefs.

The man-of-the-match was awarded to Messam. A victory parade through Hamilton was hosted in the Chiefs' honour on 6 August 2013.

=== Details ===
3 August 2013

| Chiefs | 27–22 | Brumbies |
| Try: Liam Messam 63'; Robbie Robinson 67' c Con: Aaron Cruden (1/2) 69'; Pen: Aaron Cruden 22', 25', 31', 47', 71' | ESPNscrum | Try: Christian Lealiifano 37'; Con: Christian Lealiifano (1/1) 39'; Pen: Christian Lealiifano 5', 7', 20', 45', 58' |

Waikato Stadium, Hamilton
Referee: Craig Joubert (South Africa)

| Chiefs | Brumbies |

CHIEFS:
| FB | 15 | Gareth Anscombe |
| RW | 14 | Lelia Masaga |
| OC | 13 | Charlie Ngatai |
| IC | 12 | Andrew Horrell |
| LW | 11 | Asaeli Tikoirotuma |
| FH | 10 | Aaron Cruden |
| SH | 9 | Tawera Kerr-Barlow |
| N8 | 8 | Matt Vant Leven |
| BF | 7 | Tanerau Latimer |
| OF | 6 | Liam Messam |
| RL | 5 | Brodie Retallick |
| LL | 4 | Craig Clarke (c) |
| TP | 3 | Ben Tameifuna |
| HK | 2 | Hika Elliot |
| LP | 1 | Toby Smith |
Substitutes:
| HK | 16 | Rhys Marshall |
| TP | 17 | Ben Afeaki |
| RL | 18 | Michael Fitzgerald |
| OF | 19 | Sam Cane |
| HB | 20 | Augustine Pulu |
| FB | 21 | Bundee Aki |
| RW | 22 | Robbie Robinson |
Coach:
(New Zealand) Dave Rennie

BRUMBIES:
| FB | 15 | Jesse Mogg |
| RW | 14 | Henry Speight |
| OC | 13 | Tevita Kuridrani |
| IC | 12 | Christian Lealiifano |
| LW | 11 | Clyde Rathbone |
| FH | 10 | Matt To'omua |
| SH | 9 | Nic White |
| N8 | 8 | Ben Mowen (c) |
| OF | 7 | George Smith |
| BF | 6 | Peter Kimlin |
| RL | 5 | Sam Carter |
| LL | 4 | Scott Fardy |
| TP | 3 | Ben Alexander |
| HK | 2 | Stephen Moore |
| LP | 1 | Scott Sio |
Substitutions:
| HK | 16 | Siliva Siliva |
| TP | 17 | Ruan Smith |
| LL | 18 | Fotu Auelua |
| OF | 19 | Colby Fainga'a |
| N8 | 20 | Ian Prior |
| OC | 21 | Andrew Smith |
| FH | 22 | Joe Tomane |
Coach:
(South Africa) Jake White

Man of the Match: Liam Messam
Touch judges:
(New Zealand) Chris Pollock
(New Zealand) Garratt Williamson
Television match official:
(New Zealand) Vinny Munro

| Preceded by 2012 Super Rugby Final | Super Rugby Final; 2013 | Succeeded by 2014 Super Rugby Final |
