= John Pareanga =

John Pareanga may refer to:

- John Pareanga (footballer) (born 1980), Cook Islands footballer and referee
- John Pareanga (rugby union) (born 1983), New Zealand rugby union player
