= 2012 Super Rugby final =

Men's rugby union club competition

2012 Super Rugby Final
- Event: 2012 Super Rugby season
Chiefs	Sharks
(New Zealand)	(South Africa)
37	6
- Date: 4 August 2012
- Venue: Waikato Stadium, Hamilton
- Referee: Steve Walsh (New Zealand)

The 2012 Super Rugby final was played between the South African Sharks and the New Zealand Chiefs Super Rugby teams on 4 August 2012. It was the 17th final in the Southern Hemisphere's premier transnational club rugby competition's history and the second under the newly expanded 15-team format. The Chiefs had qualified second highest during the regular season, while the Sharks qualified as the sixth, and lowest, team. The Chiefs went straight to the semi-final, where they beat fellow New Zealand team the Crusaders. The Sharks travelled to Brisbane and beat the Queensland Reds in the qualifying final and then the Stormers back in South Africa in the semi-final. As the Chiefs had qualified higher than the Sharks the final was played at Waikato Stadium, Hamilton.

In part due to the level of travel the Sharks had to make during the finals series (travelling from South Africa to Australia, back to South Africa and then on to New Zealand in just three weeks) they entered the grand final as the underdogs. They started the stronger, however, and scored first points through a penalty. The Chiefs struck back, scoring a converted try and two penalties to lead 13–3 at half-time. They extended the lead in the second half, outscoring the Sharks with three more converted tries and a penalty to just the one penalty for the visitors. The Chiefs won the game with a final score of 37–6. It was the Chiefs' first victory in the competition from their second final, and their first Grand Final appearance since 2009. For the Sharks, it was their fourth final defeat, and their first Grand Final appearance since 2007.

== Road to the final ==
Final Standings
Pos	Team	W	D	L	PD	TB	LB	Pts
1	(South Africa) Stormers	14	0	2	+96	0	2	66
2	(New Zealand) Chiefs	12	0	4	+86	5	3	64
3	(Australia) Reds	11	0	5	+12	4	2	58
4	(New Zealand) Crusaders	11	0	5	+142	5	4	61
5	(South Africa) Bulls	10	0	6	+103	6	5	59
6	(South Africa) Sharks	10	0	6	+88	7	4	59
7	(Australia) Brumbies	10	0	6	+73	5	5	58
8	(New Zealand) Hurricanes	10	0	6	+60	8	1	57
9	(New Zealand) Highlanders	9	0	7	−26	2	4	50
10	(South Africa) Cheetahs	5	0	11	−67	3	7	38
11	(Australia) Waratahs	4	0	12	−61	3	8	35
12	(New Zealand) Blues	4	0	12	−71	2	6	32
13	(Australia) Rebels	4	0	12	−158	3	5	32
14	(Australia) Force	3	0	13	−134	2	5	27
15	(South Africa) Lions	3	0	13	−143	2	3	25

The 2012 Super Rugby competition involved fifteen teams, five each from South Africa, Australia and New Zealand. 2012 marked the 17th season of the competition, and the second in the expanded 15 team format (12 teams competed between 1996 and 2005, before increasing to 14 between 2006 and 2010). The competition began on 24 February with the regular season consisting of 120 matches over twenty one weeks. Each team played teams from their own country twice (home and a way) and four teams from each of the other two countries once (two at home and two away). The top six teams after the regular season would advance to the finals. Unlike previous years, there was a three-week break between Week 15 and Week 19 to allow the three countries to play international rugby against Northern Hemisphere teams.

The Stormers finished top of the South African conference and topped the overall standings, with just two losses (to the Crusaders and Sharks). The Chiefs won the New Zealand conference and finished second overall, losing four games in total (including the last two of the regular season to drop below the Stormers). As the two top finishers both teams advanced straight into home semi-finals. The Reds beat the Waratahs in their final game of the regular season to finished top of the Australian conference after the Brumbies lost to the Blues earlier in the round. Despite finishing on the lowest points overall of the six finalists they qualified third as the top Australian team. The Crusaders, Bulls and Sharks filled the remaining three places as the next top finishers during the regular season.

The Crusaders hosted the Bulls in Christchurch in the first qualifying final, while the Sharks traveled to Brisbane to play the Reds. The Crusaders eased passed the Bulls in the first qualifier, with All Black five eight Dan Carter scoring 23 points in their 28–13 victory. In Brisbane the Sharks upset the Reds in the second qualifier, leading 20–3 after 30 minutes and out defending the opposition to win with a final score of 30–17. The two semi-finals were local derbies, with the Sharks playing the Stormers in Cape Town and the Crusaders playing the Chiefs in Hamilton. Both games were much closer than the qualifiers. The Chiefs held out the Crusaders to win 20–17, while the Sharks had to withstand a late surge from the Stormers to win 26–19.

First round
21 July 2012
4	(New Zealand) Crusaders	28
5	(South Africa) Bulls	13
21 July 2012
3	(Australia) Reds	17
6	(South Africa) Sharks	30

Semifinals
27 July 2012
2	(New Zealand) Chiefs	20
4	(New Zealand) Crusaders	17
28 July 2012
1	(South Africa) Stormers	19
6	(South Africa) Sharks	26

Final
4 August 2012
(New Zealand) Chiefs	37
(South Africa) Sharks	6

== Build-up ==
The Sharks entered the final as underdogs. Ladbrokes gave 2/1 odds to the Sharks compared to 4/9 for the Chiefs, while the TAB paid $3.10 for a Sharks win compared to $1.13 for a Chiefs win. The Sharks had to travel from South Africa to Australia, back to South Africa and then on to New Zealand during the final series. Former Springbok and current Brumbies coach Jake White believed this would make the task much harder for the Sharks. Prior to the final the two teams played each other fifteen times, with the Chiefs winning 8 of the encounters to the Sharks 7. During the regular season they met in Week 9 and the Chiefs won 18–12 in Durban. The Chiefs have only made the final once before, in 2009 when the Bulls beat them 61–17 in Pretoria (a record margin in Super Rugby finals). The Sharks had previously made three Super Rugby finals, losing all three to the Blues in 1996, the Brumbies in 2001 and the Bulls in 2007. The title has only been won by the visiting team four times (Crusaders in 1998, 1999 and 2000 and the Bulls in 2007) and only one of those occasions has been when traveling to a foreign country (when the Crusaders beat the Brumbies in Canberra in 2000).

The Sharks team broke up the flight to New Zealand by spending most of the week in Sydney before heading to Hamilton. Sharks centre Tim Whitehead was not available after he broke his hand in the semi-final, although previously injured utility backs Patrick Lambie and Paul Jordaan have both just recovered and played in the final. The Chiefs squad was the same that beat the Crusaders after in doubt captain Craig Clark recovered in time from a leg injury. Rugby journalist Spiro Zavos predicted that a key match-up would be between the two international centres, Sonny Bill Williams from the Chiefs and JP Pietersen from the Sharks. Steve Walsh, the referee of the Sharks vs Stormers game, was named to officiate the final. Walsh, a former New Zealand referee before joining the Australian conference in 2010, was controlling his second Super Rugby Final after refereeing the Bulls vs Sharks game in 2007. His assistants were Craig Joubert, the referee of the Chiefs vs Crusaders semi-final, and Keith Brown, with Garratt Williamson the video referee.

The 25,100 tickets for the final sold out three days before the game. Season members and sponsors purchased 8000 while the public bought the remaining tickets two hours after they went on sale. Big screens were erected for fans in Hamilton at Garden Place and on Hood Street.

== Match ==
=== Summary ===
The Chiefs won the game 37–6, scoring four tries to none, to claim their first Super Rugby title. The Sharks dominated the match early, scoring first points when Frédéric Michalak kicked a penalty after six minutes. The Chiefs worked their way back into the game, scoring the first try in the 19th minute. Andrew Horrell claimed an Aaron Cruden chip kick and after a Sonny Bill Williams break the ball was moved wide for Tim Nanai-Williams to score in the corner. Cruden converted the try and then kicked two more penalties after Jannie and Bismarck du Plessis infringed to have the Chiefs leading 13–3 at half time.

The Chiefs scored their second try early in the second half. After Michalak's clearing kick got charged down in goal number eight Kane Thompson drove over from the resulting five-metre scrum. The conversion from Cruden made the score 20–3 in favour of the Chiefs. Michalak kicked a second penalty with 30 minutes remaining to bring the Sharks within fourteen points, before Lelia Masaga claimed a mis-directed Sharks pass, resulting from a big Williams tackle, and outran the defence to score the Chiefs third try. The conversion gave the Chiefs a 27–6 lead going into the final quarter of the game. Cruden kicked one more penalty before Williams scored the fourth and final try in the last few minutes to give the Chiefs a convincing victory.

=== Details ===
4 August 2012

Chiefs	37–6	Sharks
Try: Tim Nanai-Williams 19'; Kane Thompson 46'; Lelia Masaga 61'; Sonny Bill Williams 77'; Con: Aaron Cruden 20', 47', 62', 78' (4/4); Pen: Aaron Cruden 25', 34', 72' (3/5)		Pen: Frédéric Michalak 6', 52' (2/2)

Waikato Stadium, Hamilton
Attendance: 25,100
Referee: Steve Walsh (Australia)

Chiefs	Sharks

FB	15	Robbie Robinson
RW	14	Tim Nanai-Williams
OC	13	Andrew Horrell
IC	12	Sonny Bill Williams
LW	11	Asaeli Tikoirotuma
FH	10	Aaron Cruden
SH	9	Tawera Kerr-Barlow
N8	8	Kane Thompson
BF	7	Tanerau Latimer
OF	6	Liam Messam
RL	5	Brodie Retallick
LL	4	Craig Clarke (c)
TP	3	Ben Tameifuna
HK	2	Mahonri Schwalger
LP	1	Sona Taumalolo
Substitutes:
HK	16	Hika Elliot
TP	17	Ben Afeaki
RL	18	Michael Fitzgerald
OF	19	Sam Cane
HB	20	Brendon Leonard
FB	21	Jackson Willison
RW	22	Lelia Masaga
Coach:
(New Zealand) Dave Rennie

FB	15	Patrick Lambie
RW	14	Louis Ludik
OC	13	JP Pietersen
IC	12	Paul Jordaan
LW	11	Lwazi Mvovo
FH	10	Frédéric Michalak
SH	9	Charl McLeod
N8	8	Ryan Kankowski
OF	7	Marcell Coetzee
BF	6	Keegan Daniel (c)
RL	5	Anton Bresler
LL	4	Willem Alberts
TP	3	Jannie du Plessis
HK	2	Bismarck du Plessis
LP	1	Tendai Mtawarira
Substitutions:
HK	16	Craig Burden
TP	17	Wiehahn Herbst
LL	18	Steven Sykes
OF	19	Jacques Botes
N8	20	Jean Deysel
OC	21	Meyer Bosman
FH	22	Riaan Viljoen
Coach:
(South Africa) John Plumtree

Man of the Match:
Liam Messam (Chiefs)

Touch judges:
Craig Joubert (South Africa)
Keith Brown (New Zealand)
Television match official:
Garratt Williamson (New Zealand)

Preceded by 2011 Super Rugby Final	Super Rugby Final; 2012	Succeeded by 2013 Super Rugby Final
