= Frank Bryant =

Frank Bryant may refer to:

- Frank Bryant (cricketer) (1909–1984), Australian cricketer
- Frank Bryant (politician) (1864–1946), Australian politician
- Frank Bryant, of the American musical duo Just Brothers

== See also ==
- Francis Bryant (born 1982), known as Frankie, New Zealand rugby union player
- Frank Briant (1865–1934), radical British Liberal Party politician
- Frank Briante (1905–1996), American football player
