= James McGougan =

- Born: James McGougan; 12 October 1984 (age 42) Whakatāne, New Zealand
- Height: 1.84 m (6 ft 0 in)
- Weight: 120 kg (18 st 13 lb; 265 lb)
- School: Trident High School

Rugby union career
- Position: Prop
Provincial / State sides
| Years | Team | Apps | (Points) |
| 2007–2010, 2015- | Bay of Plenty | 32 | (5) |
| 2011 | Otago | 8 | (0) |
| 2014-? | Waikato | 7 | (0) |
- Correct as of 9 October 2014
Super Rugby
| Years | Team | Apps | (Points) |
| 2009–2010 | Chiefs | 16 | (0) |

James McGougan (born 12 October 1984 in Whakatāne, New Zealand) is a rugby union prop who currently plays provincial rugby for Bay of Plenty in the ITM Cup. He has also previously played for the Chiefs in the Super Rugby competition.

== Playing career ==
McGougan made his debut for Bay of Plenty during the 2007 Air New Zealand Cup and by the 2008 Air New Zealand Cup was a regular starter for the province. His strong performances earned him a contract with the Chiefs for the 2009 Super 14 season, and he turned in an excellent campaign, making 15 appearances as the Chiefs reached the Super Rugby final. His season was capped with a selection to the Junior All Blacks when Jamie Mackintosh was forced to withdraw due to injury.

After another strong provincial season for Bay of Plenty, McGougan was back with the Chiefs for the 2010 season, but missed almost the entire year due to a back injury, making only a single substitute appearance. His back problems continued during the 2010 ITM Cup, where he was forced to end his season after 7 matches and rule himself out of the 2011 Super Rugby season.

After his injury layoff, McGougan signed with Otago for the 2011 ITM Cup.

McGougan was part of one of two teams picked by the coaching staff of Bay of Plenty for the 2015 official Steamers trial on 17 June, which was held at Rotorua International Stadium.
