= Doug Tietjens =

NZ rugby union player

- Born: 7 February 1984 (age 42) Kalgoorlie, Western Australia
- Height: 1.85 m (6 ft 1 in)
- Weight: 101 kg (15 st 13 lb)
- School: Palmerston North Boys' High School
- University: University of Otago; Massey University

Rugby union career
- Position: Flanker
Provincial / State sides
Years	Team	Apps	(Points)
2008–12	Manawatu	45	(20)
2013–15	Taranaki	11	(0)
Super Rugby
Years	Team	Apps	(Points)
2012	Highlanders	6	(0)
- Correct as of 29 July 2012

Doug Tietjens (born 7 February 1984) is a former Australian-born New Zealand rugby union player who last played as a flanker for Taranaki in the National Provincial Championship, having shifted north to the province after 45 matches with Manawatu from 2008 to 2012.

== Domestic career ==
Although he was born in Australia, Tietjens grew up in New Zealand and attended school in Palmerston North. He moved south to attend the University of Otago in 2004, and was selected to Otago B sides in 2006 and 2007 but never played for the full Otago provincial squad.

Returning north in 2008, Tietjens cracked the Manawatu squad for the 2008 Air New Zealand Cup. He continues as a solid squad player for the Turbos for the next few seasons, before having a breakout year in the 2011 ITM Cup, scoring 4 tries for a vastly improved side.

Tietjens missed the entire 2012 ITM Cup after suffering a major knee injury while playing Super Rugby. For the 2013 ITM Cup, Tietjens moved to Taranaki and made 8 appearances in his comeback from serious injury.

=== Super Rugby ===
After his strong season with Manawatu in 2011, Tietjens was signed by the Highlanders for the 2012 Super Rugby season. He made 6 appearances for the club before his season was ended prematurely by a serious knee injury.
