= Buxton Popoali'i =

New Zealand rugby player (born 1989)

- Born: 4 December 1989 (age 36) Auckland, New Zealand
- Height: 1.73 m (5 ft 8 in)
- Weight: 87 kg (192 lb)
- Occupation: Personal trainer

Rugby union career
- Position(s): Wing, Fullback
Provincial / State sides
Years	Team	Apps	(Points)
2008–10	Wellington	18	(0)
2011–13	Otago	31	(60)
Super Rugby
Years	Team	Apps	(Points)
2012–13	Highlanders	15	(0)
National sevens team
Years	Team		Comps
2010–2011	New Zealand 7s		

Buxton Popoali'i (born 4 December 1989) is a former New Zealand rugby union player who played club rugby for Dunedin side Green Island, provincial Mitre 10 Cup rugby for Wellington between 2008 and 2010 and for Otago between 2011 and 2013. He also made 15 appearances for the Highlanders in 2012 and 2013. He usually played as a winger or fullback.

He retired from professional rugby in 2014, aged 24, due to a heart condition.

== Playing career ==
Popoali'i overcame heart valve replacement surgery at age 16 to crack the Wellington provincial squad for the 2008 Air New Zealand Cup. He would spend three seasons with Wellington, but appeared in only 19 matches over that stretch, mainly off the bench.

Looking for more playing time, Popoali'i moved to Otago for the 2011 ITM Cup. He quickly established himself as a starter on the wing, and scored his first provincial try in a 32–25 victory over Auckland on 20 July. He finished the season as the province's leading try-scorer with 4, and was the only Otago player to start every match over the year.

Popoali'i is also an accomplished rugby sevens player, and appeared in two sevens tournaments for New Zealand in 2010. He was again on the New Zealand sevens squad in 2011.

Popoali'i was named in the 2012 wider training squad for the Highlanders in 2011. Popoali'i made his Super Rugby debut for the Highlanders on the right wing in the 23–19 victory against the Chiefs on 25 February 2012 in Hamilton.
