= Toby Arnold =

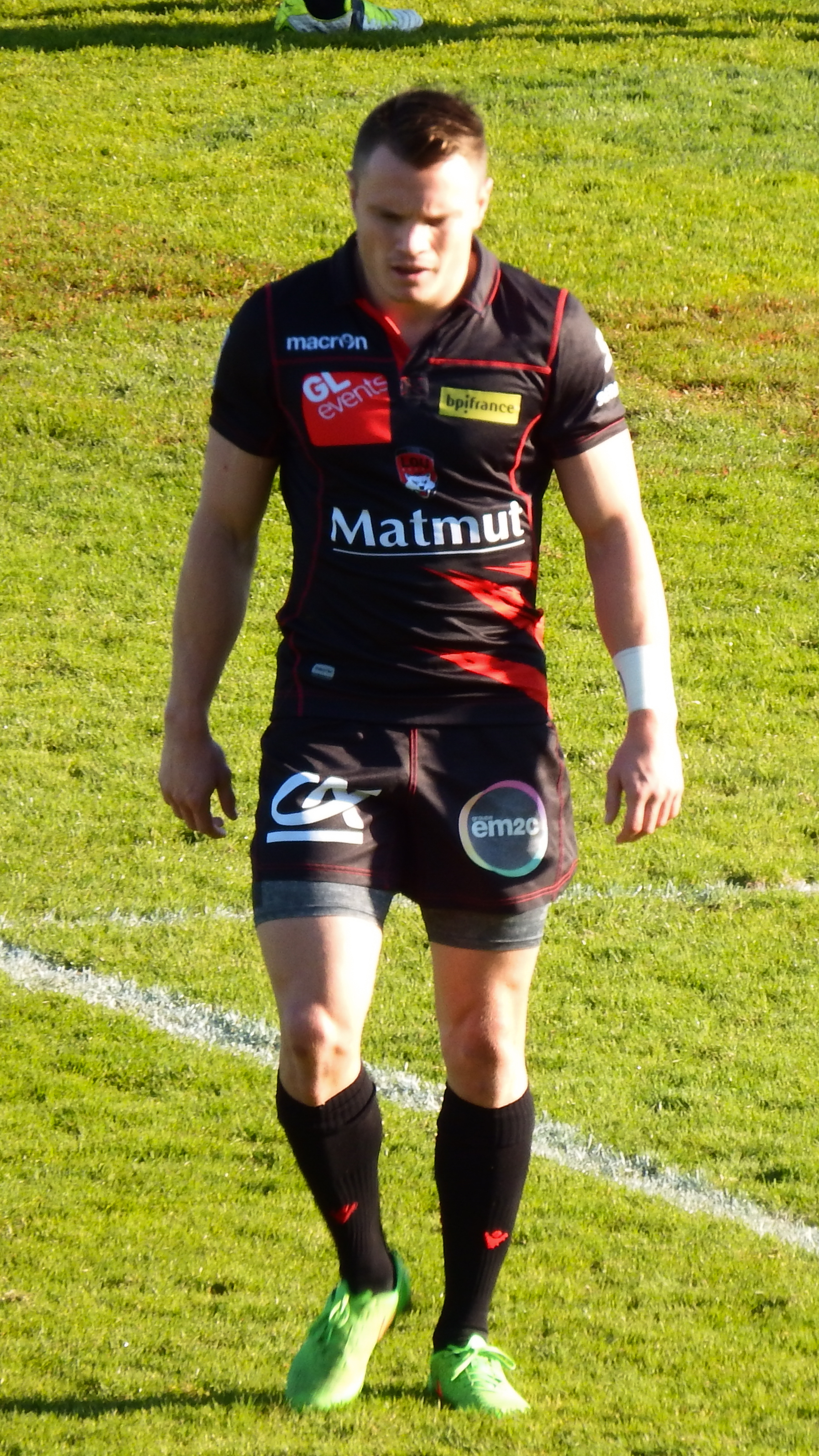
- Arnold in 2015
- Born: 11 September 1987 (age 39) Te Kūiti, New Zealand
- Height: 1.78 m (5 ft 10 in)
- Weight: 87 kg (192 lb)

Rugby union career
- Position(s): Fullback, Wing
Senior career
Years	Team	Apps	(Points)
2013–	Lyon	221	(375)
Provincial / State sides
Years	Team	Apps	(Points)
2007–12	Bay of Plenty	31	(40)
National sevens team
Years	Team		Comps
2009–12	New Zealand 7s		(19)
Medal record
Men's rugby sevens
Representing New Zealand
Commonwealth Games
Gold medal – first place	2010 Delhi	Team competition

Toby Arnold (born 11 September 1987) is a New Zealand rugby union player. Arnold currently plays for French club Lyon after signing in 2013.

Arnold generally plays in the fullback and wing positions.

He notably played for the Bay of Plenty Steamers in New Zealand's National Provincial Championship.

He has also played for the All Blacks Sevens team, making his debut in 2009. A year later he was included in the squad to the 2010 Commonwealth Games in Delhi.

Arnold gave up on his 2012 Olympics dream after a serious knee injury in that year left him rethinking his future.
