= Toby Lynn =

- Born: Toby Lynn; 6 October 1984 (age 42) Hamilton, New Zealand
- Height: 1.97 m (6 ft 5 1/2 in)
- Weight: 113 kg (17 st 11 lb)

Rugby union career
- Position: Lock
- Current team: Wanneroo, WA
Provincial / State sides
Years	Team	Apps	(Points)
2004–11	Waikato	64	(15)
- Correct as of 14 April 2012
Super Rugby
Years	Team	Apps	(Points)
2007–09	Chiefs	32	(0)
2012–13	Force	30	(10)
- Correct as of 15 July 2013

Toby Lynn (born 6 October 1984) is a New Zealand rugby union footballer. His regular playing position is lock. He represented the Western Force in Super Rugby until 2013. He previously played for the Chiefs and made his franchise debut during the 2007 Super 14 season against the Brumbies.
