= Mat Luamanu =

- Born: Matthew Luamanu; 25 November 1988 (age 37) Wellington, New Zealand
- Height: 1.93 m (6 ft 4 in)
- Weight: 130 kg (20 st 7 lb; 290 lb)
- School: St Patrick's College, Silverstream

Rugby union career
- Position(s): Lock, Flanker, Number 8
- Current team: Aviron Bayonnais
Senior career
Years	Team	Apps	(Points)
2012–2014	Kyuden Voltex	24	(35)
2014–2015	Benetton Treviso	22	(15)
2015–2019	Harlequins	73	(45)
2019–	Bayonne	58	(45)
- Correct as of 21 June 2022
Provincial / State sides
Years	Team	Apps	(Points)
2008–2010	Wellington	8	(5)
2010–2012	North Harbour	22	(85)
Super Rugby
Years	Team	Apps	(Points)
2010–2011	Blues	3	(0)
International career
Years	Team	Apps	(Points)
2018–	Samoa	2	(0)
- Correct as of 25 October 2018

Mat Luamanu (born 25 November 1988) is a New Zealand rugby union player for Bayonne in the Top 14.

Luamanu played representative rugby for Wellington from Under-16 through to the Under-21 level, and also played for the Hurricanes Schools team for two years. He represented New Zealand Schools and New Zealand Under-20s, winning the 2008 IRB Junior World Championship in Wales.

He made his provincial debut for Wellington in 2008. Luamanu switched from Wellington to North Harbour for the 2010 ITM Cup, Luamanu shone, scoring hat-tricks on two occasions. Luamanu had a superb season with North Harbour in 2010 NPC competition and was rewarded with selection to the Blues squad in 2011.

Luamanu played four games in Super Rugby in 2011 but found his route blocked by the presence of Jerome Kaino. He subsequently had another fantastic season of NPC rugby in 2011 for North Harbour which saw him receiving offers in France and Japan. He opted for Japan and played the 2012–13 and 2013–14 season for Kyuden Voltex in the Top League.

A move to northern Italy was next for 2014–15 season as Luamanu joined Benetton Treviso to play in the Pro12 and European Rugby Champions Cup. Luamanu made his move to England to join Harlequins in the Aviva Premiership from the 2015–16 season.

On 11 June 2019, Luamanu travels to France to sign for Bayonne in the Top 14 competition from the 2019–20 season.
