= Andrew Goodman (rugby union) =

- Born: Andrew David Goodman; 28 October 1982 (age 44) Nelson, New Zealand
- Height: 1.87 m (6 ft 2 in)
- Weight: 105 kg (231 lb)
- School: Nelson College
- University: University of Otago

Rugby union career
- Position: Centre
Senior career
| Years | Team | Apps | (Points) |
| 2010–2011 | Honda Heat | | |
| 2012–2014 | Leinster | 17 | (11) |
| 2014 | Toyota Industries Shuttles | 3 | (6) |
Provincial / State sides
| Years | Team | Apps | (Points) |
| 2007–2009, 2011–2012, 2015 | Tasman | 55 | (291) |

Andrew David Goodman (born 28 October 1982) is a New Zealand rugby union coach and former player, who played for and captained the Tasman Mako in the National Provincial Championship.

== Career ==
In July 2012, Goodman signed a one-year deal with Leinster.

Goodman was educated at Nelson College from 1996 to 2000. In 1999 and 2000, he was a member of both the school's top rugby team and top cricket team. He then studied physical education and teaching at the University of Otago for five years, before returning to Nelson College as a physical education teacher. In late 2014 he again returned to Nelson after two seasons at Leinster, and accepted a position as head of the rugby academy at Nelson College for 2015.

He spent time as head coach of Tasman in the Bunnings NPC and assistant coach of the Crusaders in Super Rugby. In June 2022, it was announced that Goodman would join Leinster ahead of the 2022/23 season.

On 21 December 2023, Goodman was appointed as backs coach for the Ireland men's rugby team, replacing former England player and Ireland coach Mike Catt.

On 26 March 2025, Goodman was appointed as one of the Lions assistance coaches for their tour of Australia, joining Simon Easterby, John Fogarty, John Dalziel & Richard Wigglesworth, with Andy Farrell as the Head Coach.
