= Cameron Goodhue =

New Zealand rugby union player

- Born: Cameron David Goodhue; 24 January 1987 (age 39) Auckland, New Zealand
- Height: 1.90 m (6 ft 3 in)
- Weight: 110 kg (17 st 5 lb)
- Notable relative(s): Jack Goodhue (Brother), Josh Goodhue (Brother)

Rugby union career
- Position: Flanker
Senior career
| Years | Team | Apps | (Points) |
| 2010–2012 | Northland | 20 | (10) |
| 2012 | Blues | 1 | (0) |
| 2013–2014 | Worcester Warriors | 4 | (0) |
| 2014–2015 | London Welsh | 0 | (0) |
| 2015 | Northland | 0 | |

Cameron David Goodhue (born 24 January 1987) is a New Zealand rugby union player for London Welsh. He previously played for Northland and the Blues. He weighs 110 kg and stands at 6 ft 3in He plays as a number eight or flanker.

In June 2013, Goodhue signed for Worcester Warriors. After one season, he was signed by newly promoted side London Welsh from the 2014–15 season.
