= Mark Bright (rugby union) =

New Zealand-born rugby union player (born 1978)

- Born: Mark Roy Bright; 29 September 1978 (age 48) Nelson, New Zealand
- Height: 1.91 m (6 ft 3 in)
- Weight: 107 kg (236 lb)
- School: Nelson College

Rugby union career
- Position: Number 8
Senior career
Years	Team	Apps	(Points)
2006–2011	Redruth	119	(395)
2011–2016	London Scottish	147	(387)
2016–2018	Ealing Trailfinders	53	(72)
2018–2021	London Scottish		
2021-	Richmond		
- Correct as of 10 October 2014
Provincial / State sides
Years	Team	Apps	(Points)
2001–2005	Nelson Bays		
2006–2009, 2011	Tasman Mako	52	(45)
2008–2009	Cornwall		
National sevens team
Years	Team		Comps
2014	England		

Mark Roy Bright (born 29 September 1978) is a New Zealand-born rugby union player who plays for Richmond in the RFU Championship.

== Career ==
Born in Nelson, New Zealand in 1978, Bright was educated at Nelson College from 1992 to 1996. A number eight, he has represented Nelson Bays, Tasman and Cornwall at a provincial or county level, and was a member of the England Sevens team at the 2014 Commonwealth Games in Glasgow. He currently plays for Richmond in the RFU Championship.
