= Chris Noakes =

New Zealand rugby union player

- Born: Chris Noakes; 21 July 1985 (age 41) Auckland, New Zealand
- Height: 1.82 m (6 ft 0 in)
- Weight: 86 kg (13 st 8 lb)
- University: Otago University

Rugby union career
- Position: Fly-half
Senior career
Years	Team	Apps	(Points)
2014–2016	London Irish	29	(88)
- Correct as of 10 January 2016
Provincial / State sides
Years	Team	Apps	(Points)
2007–10	Otago	26	(120)
2011–2014	Bay of Plenty	16	(117)
- Correct as of 4 November 2012
Super Rugby
Years	Team	Apps	(Points)
2012	Highlanders	12	(86)
2013–2014	Blues	15	(94)
- Correct as of 1 June 2014

Chris Noakes (born 21 July 1985 in Auckland, New Zealand) is a professional rugby union player.

== Career ==
=== ITM Cup ===
Noakes made his debut for Otago in 2007 and was a regular starter by the 2008 Air New Zealand Cup, where he scored 51 points for the province. His 2009 season was highlighted by a try in a Ranfurly Shield challenge against Wellington which Otago ultimately narrowly lost. After missing most of the 2010 ITM Cup through injury, Noakes returned to start the final four matches of the season. For the 2011 ITM Cup, Noakes moved to Bay of Plenty to replace the departing Mike Delany at first five-eighth.

Noakes missed the entire 2013 ITM Cup competition following a serious neck injury during the previous Super Rugby season.

=== Super Rugby ===
Noakes was signed by the Highlanders for the 2012 Super Rugby season. Initially expected to be a depth player, injuries to Colin Slade and Lima Sopoaga thrust him into a more prominent role, and he made 12 appearances including 7 starts, totalling 86 points in the process.

Noakes joined the Blues for the 2013 Super Rugby season and emerged as a key member of the squad, starting 12 of the first 14 games before having his season ended by a prolapsed disc in his neck and subsequent surgery.

=== London Irish ===
On 1 May 2014, Noakes moved to England when he signed for London Irish to compete in the Aviva Premiership with a two-year contract from the 2014–15 season.

=== Karori Stonecutters ===
Noakes is expected to make his debut for gun t20 team, the Karori Stonecutters, on 14 February 2021.
