= Shane Cleaver =

- Born: Shane Cleaver; 12 June 1987 (age 39) New Zealand
- Height: 1.83 m (6 ft 0 in)
- Weight: 114 kg (17 st 13 lb)
- School: Francis Douglas Memorial College

Rugby union career
- Position: Prop
Provincial / State sides
Years	Team	Apps	(Points)
2007–	Taranaki	33	(0)
- Correct as of 23 October 2013
Super Rugby
Years	Team	Apps	(Points)
2012	Chiefs	2	(0)
- Correct as of 25 April 2012

Shane Cleaver (born 12 June 1987) is a New Zealand rugby union footballer. His regular playing position is prop. He represents the Chiefs in Super Rugby and Taranaki in the ITM Cup.

== Early life ==
Shane captained the Hurricanes Under 18 Schools Team that played in the NZ Schools Regional Tournament. He was then selected in the New Zealand Schools Team to play two games in Australia. He went on to score a try in the first game and played against Australian Schools in the test match won by New Zealand 22–19. Shane was the first student from FDMC to be selected in the New Zealand Schools Team.
