= Steve Walsh (rugby union) =

New Zealand born rugby union referee in Australia

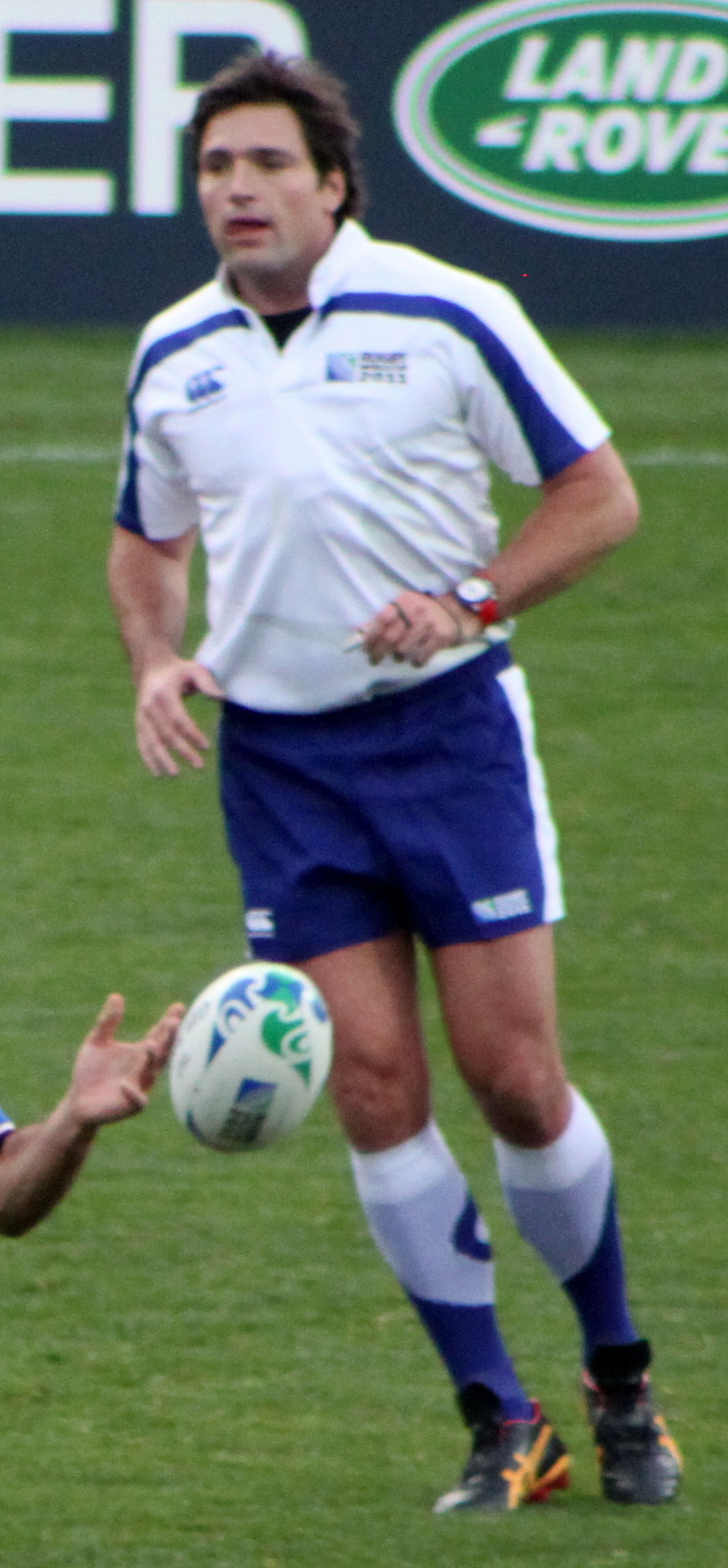
- Walsh during 2011 Rugby World Cup

Personal information
- Born: 28 March 1972 (age 54)

Rugby union
- Position: Referee

Refereeing information
Years	Competition	Apps
2011; 2007; 2003	2011 Rugby World Cup; 2007 Rugby World Cup; 2003 Rugby World Cup	4; 4; 3

Steve Walsh (born 28 March 1972) is a retired professional rugby union referee from New Zealand. He officiated at international level from 1998 to 2014, and at three Rugby World Cups, including refereeing the semi-final between South Africa and Argentina in 2007. Walsh became the most experienced Super Rugby referee in 2014, passing Jonathan Kaplan's record before retiring from the game in 2015.

== Early life ==
Steve Reid Walsh was born in Cambridge, New Zealand and attended Glenfield College and the Kristin School in Auckland. He played junior provincial representative rugby until a spinal injury and subsequent medical check ended his playing career at the age of 13. Scans revealed just two-and-a-half vertebrae in his neck, a birth defect which meant his neck was unstable and ruled him out of playing contact sport.

== Career ==
Walsh began refereeing at age 16 and went on to become the youngest official to make his NPC debut, in the third division, just four years later. He worked as a customs agent and as a salesman before taking up professional refereeing on a full-time basis in 1998.

=== International referee ===
At the age of 23, Walsh made his Test refereeing debut on 13 June 1998, when France beat Argentina 35–18 in Buenos Aires. He was the youngest Test referee at the top level at that time. He made his Rugby World Cup debut as a touch judge in 1999.

He took control of Tri Nations opener between South Africa and Australia in Cape Town on 12 July 2003.

Walsh refereed at the 2003 Rugby World Cup. He was involved in a verbal altercation with the England fitness coach Dave Reddin in the match against Samoa. Reddin was cleared of misconduct for his part in the incident but was banned from touchline duties for two games for sending winger Dan Luger onto the field against the match official's orders. Walsh was suspended for three days, missing one match, before going on to referee the quarter-final between Australia and Scotland.

During the British & Irish Lions tour to New Zealand in 2005, Irish winger Shane Horgan was called for a knock-on in a match against Taranaki, on touch judge Walsh's advice. Horgan disputed the decision and was met with verbal abuse from Walsh. After the Lions made an official complaint, Walsh was suspended from officiating duties for four months.

In 2007 he refereed some notable matches, including the 2007 Super 14 Final, the first international rugby match at Croke Park in Ireland, and refereed four matches at the 2007 Rugby World Cup, including the South Africa v Argentina semi-final.

Walsh received a third strike on his record, when he was asked to leave a refereeing conference in Sydney after turning up drunk in December 2008. A New Zealand Rugby Union statement in January had said that he would not be considered for the opening month of Super 14 matches. In April 2009, the New Zealand Rugby Union announced that Walsh had retired from his refereeing position.

=== Move to Australia ===
Walsh moved to Bondi in Sydney later in 2009. He was offered affiliation to the Australian Rugby Union and began refereeing school rugby and club rugby. He progressed to first grade, refereeing the semi-final between Sydney University and Eastwood, and narrowly missed out on being appointed to the 2009 Shute Shield Grand Final, which was refereed by Stuart Dickinson.

Walsh was included in the reserve panel of referees for the 2010 Super 14 competition, now representing Australia, and was reappointed to the IRB Elite panel, the highest level, in 2010.

In March 2011, he was the referee for the Scotland v Italy match at Murrayfield in the Six Nations Championship. Walsh was appointed to the 2011 Rugby World Cup and refereed several games in New Zealand, representing the Australian Rugby Union.

He was the referee for the 2012 Super Rugby Final between the Chiefs and the Sharks in Hamilton. At the end of that year Walsh received the 'Referee of the Year' award during the John Eales Medal ceremony in Sydney.

=== Retirement ===
Walsh retired from all levels of refereeing in March 2015 to take up business interests outside the game. He retired holding the record for the most Super Rugby matches refereed at 111, and with the third most Test Matches refereed at 60. His last test match as an official was on 22 November 2014 between France and Argentina, though this was as an assistant referee. His last match as the main referee was on 15 November between England and South Africa at Twickenham Stadium. He was appointed to referee the Wales - Ireland match in the 2015 Six Nations Championship, but withdrew from that match due to business commitments, His final Super Rugby Match as an official was at AAMI Park, between Melbourne Rebels and Brumbies in Round 3 of the 2015 Super Rugby season.

== Tattoo ==
Walsh has a tattoo on his left inner forearm which reads 'He who controls himself, controls the game'. During the 2011 Rugby World Cup this tattoo was covered by a flesh-coloured plaster.
