= Johnny Legg =

- Born: 10 September 1989 (age 37) Christchurch, New Zealand
- Height: 177 cm (5 ft 10 in)
- Weight: 90 kg (14 st 2 lb; 198 lb)
- School: Ellesmere college

Rugby union career
- Current team: Leeston Div 3
Provincial / State sides
Years	Team	Apps	(Points)
2009-2012	Otago	14	(0)

Johnny Legg (born 10 September 1987 in Christchurch, New Zealand) is a rugby union player who played at scrum-half for Otago in the ITM Cup.

== Playing career ==
Legg played age-group level in Canterbury and was selected to U-19 and U-20 national teams. In 2009, he moved south to Otago and made his first two appearances for the province in the 2009 Air New Zealand Cup.

In the 2010 ITM Cup, he served as the regular backup to Sean Romans at halfback, appearing in 12 of 13 Otago matches. He made his first start in a 13–11 victory over Tasman on 12 September.
