= David Raikuna =

Fijian rugby union footballer (born 1987)

- Born: David Raikuna; 18 August 1987 (age 39) Suva, Fiji
- Height: 1.82 m (6 ft 0 in)
- Weight: 93 kg (14 st 9 lb; 205 lb)

Rugby union career
- Position: Wing
Provincial / State sides
Years	Team	Apps	(Points)
2008–10	Counties Manukau	10	(0)
2011–2015	North Harbour	29	(30)
2015-17	Stade Rochelais	7	(5)
2017-18	Strasbourg	14	(15)
2019-	Carqueiranne-Hyères	18	(30)
- Correct as of 13 October 2014
Super Rugby
Years	Team	Apps	(Points)
2012	Blues	10	(5)
- Correct as of 4 June 2012
National sevens team
Years	Team		Comps
2011	New Zealand 7s		

David Raikuna (born 24 August 1987 in Suva, Fiji), is a professional rugby union player. He currently plays for Stade Rochelais in the Top 14. He has also played for the New Zealand sevens team. Raikuna plays predominantly as a winger, although has the ability to cover centre and fullback.

== Career ==
Raikuna made his debut for Counties Manukau in 2010, before signing with North Harbour for the 2011 season. In the same year, he was selected for the New Zealand sevens team. He was signed by the Blues for the 2012 season and made his Super Rugby debut against the Crusaders in the first round of the competition.
