= John Pareanga (rugby union) =

New Zealand rugby union player (born 1983)

- Full name: Little John Te Akatutu Pareanga
- Born: 14 February 1983 (age 43)
- Height: 172 cm (5 ft 8 in)
- Weight: 109 kg (240 lb)

Rugby union career
- Position: Hooker
Provincial / State sides
Years	Team	Apps	(Points)
2003	Waikato	1	(0)
2005–12	Bay of Plenty	71	(20)
Super Rugby
Years	Team	Apps	(Points)
2004	Chiefs	2	(0)

Little John Te Akatutu Pareanga (born 14 February 1983) is a New Zealand former professional rugby union player.

Originally from Rarotonga in the Cook Islands, Pareanga attended Rotorua Boys' High School and played in their under-15s, before finishing his education at Te Kuiti High School, from where he earned New Zealand Schools representative honours. He won junior World Cups with New Zealand Under-19s and New Zealand Colts.

Pareanga competed as a hooker with the Bay of Plenty from 2005 to 2012, making 71 appearances. He featured twice for the Chiefs during the 2004 Super 12 season while Tom Willis was out with injury. Used off the bench, Pareanga played against Cats at Ellis Park and Stormers at Waikato Stadium, until being sidelined by an injury to his ankle.
