= Alex Bradley (rugby union) =

- Born: Alex Bradley; 30 September 1981 (age 45) Morrinsville, New Zealand
- Height: 1.89 m (6 ft 2 1/2 in)
- Weight: 117 kg (18 st 6 lb)

Rugby union career
- Position: Eighthman
Provincial / State sides
Years	Team	Apps	(Points)
2009–2012	Waikato	38	(40)
- Correct as of 4 June 2013
Super Rugby
Years	Team	Apps	(Points)
2012	Chiefs	6	(0)
- Correct as of 9 August 2012

Alex Bradley (born 30 September 1981), is a New Zealand rugby union footballer. His regular playing position is No. 8. He plays for the Chiefs in Super Rugby and Waikato in the ITM Cup.
