= Francis Bryant =

- Born: 17 January 1982 (age 44) Masterton, New Zealand
- Height: 1.8 m (5 ft 11 in)
- Weight: 96 kg (212 lb)
- School: Palmerston North Boys High School

Rugby union career
- Position: Centre
Amateur team(s)
Years	Team	Apps	(Points)
- Old Boys Marist
–	Te Kawau		
Provincial / State sides
Years	Team	Apps	(Points)
2006–12	Manawatu	80	(45)

Francis "Frankie" Bryant (born 17 January 1982) is a former New Zealand rugby union player. He notably played for the Manawatu Turbos in the National Provincial Championship, mainly as a centre.

A strong runner, Bryant formed a partnership with former players, Matty James and Johnny Leota.
