= Marcel Cummings-Toone =

- Born: 17 July 1984 (age 42) Christchurch, New Zealand
- Height: 179 cm (5 ft 10 in)
- Weight: 105 kg (16 st 7 lb)
- School: Shirley Boys' High School
- University: Christchurch Polytechnic Institute of Technology

Rugby union career
- Position: Hooker
Provincial / State sides
Years	Team	Apps	(Points)
2010	Bay of Plenty	7	(15)
2010	Canterbury (Loan)	1	(0)
2011–12	Waikato	17	(15)
2013	Canterbury	5	(0)
Super Rugby
Years	Team	Apps	(Points)
2012	Chiefs	1	(0)

Marcel Cummings-Toone (born 17 July 1984) is a former New Zealand rugby union player. His regular playing position was hooker. He debuted at provincial level in 2006 for Bay of Plenty, but his career was hampered by shoulder injuries and he only managed 7 first class appearances between 2006 and 2009 scoring 3 tries. He played one game for Canterbury in 2010 against Taranaki and sat on the bench against Northland that year before heading to Waikato in 2011. He was a part of the Chiefs Super Rugby squad in 2012 where he made one appearance off the bench against the Brumbies in Mount Maunganui. During his two seasons with Waikato he played 17 games and scored 3 tries, he captained Waikato in their 2012 win over his old side Bay of Plenty and scored the first try in the Mooloos successful Ranfurly Shield challenge.
