= Andrew Horrell =

- Born: Andrew Horrell; 18 July 1988 (age 38) Christchurch, Canterbury Region, New Zealand
- Height: 1.82 m (6 ft 0 in)
- Weight: 93 kg (14 st 9 lb)

Rugby union career
- Position: Midfield Back / Fly-Half / Fullback
Senior career
Years	Team	Apps	(Points)
2016−17	Coca-Cola Red Sparks	0	(0)
- Correct as of 15 January 2017
Provincial / State sides
Years	Team	Apps	(Points)
2009–15	Hawkes Bay	53	(216)
- Correct as of 23 October 2015
Super Rugby
Years	Team	Apps	(Points)
2012–16	Chiefs	52	(56)
- Correct as of 31 July 2016

Andrew Horrell (born 18 July 1988) is a New Zealand rugby union player who represents the Coca-Cola Red Sparks.

In 2013, he signed a contract extension with the Chiefs until 2015.

== 2011 ITM Cup ==
Horrell came to prominence in the 2011 ITM Cup where he was the competitions highest scorer with 152 points.
