= Asaeli Tikoirotuma =

Fiji international rugby union player

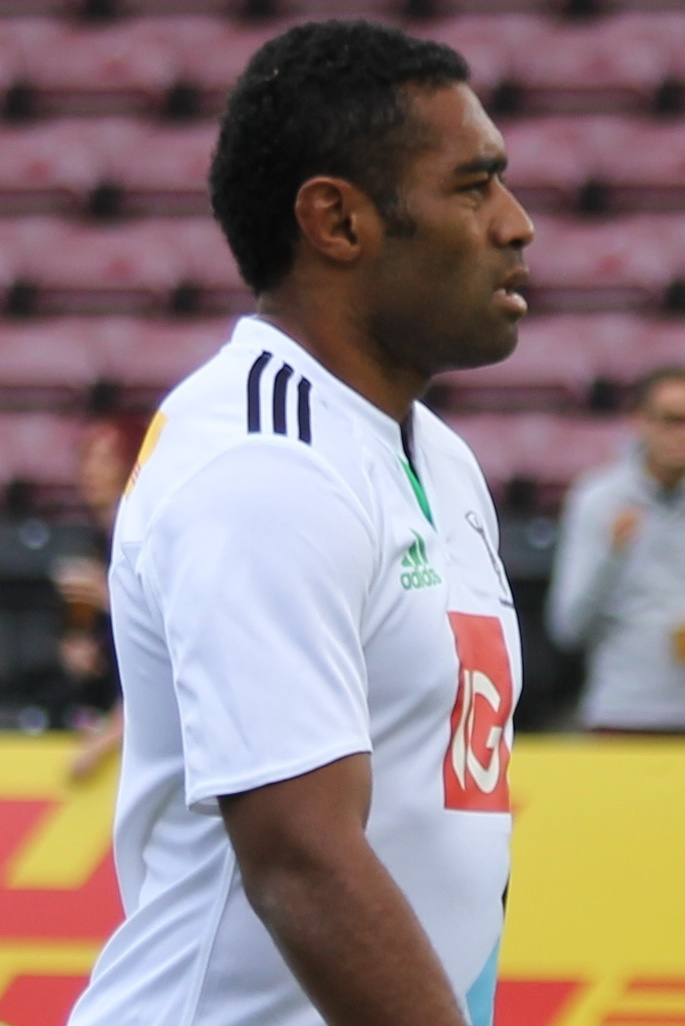
- Asaeli playing for Harlequins
- Born: Asaeli T. Tikoirotuma; 24 June 1986 (age 40) Suva, Dominion of Fiji
- Height: 1.87 m (6 ft 1 1/2 in)
- Weight: 91 kg (14 st 5 lb; 201 lb)
- School: Marist Brothers High School

Rugby union career
- Position(s): Wing; Centre
Senior career
Years	Team	Apps	(Points)
2014–2015	Harlequins	13	(10)
2015–2018	London Irish	54	(85)
2020−	Fijian Latui		
Provincial / State sides
Years	Team	Apps	(Points)
2010–2013	Manawatu	65	(155)
2019−	North Harbour	16	(15)
- Correct as of 22 October 2020
Super Rugby
Years	Team	Apps	(Points)
2012–2014	Chiefs	45	(65)
- Correct as of 24 August 2015
International career
Years	Team	Apps	(Points)
2013–	Fiji	24	(15)
- Correct as of 25 November 2017

Asaeli Tikoirotuma (born 24 June 1986) is a Fijian rugby union player. His regular playing position is wing.

Until 2018 he played for the London Irish in the Green King IPA Championship

In his inaugural Super Rugby season in 2012, he won the Super Rugby title with the Chiefs on 4 August at the 2012 Super Rugby Final at home at Waikato Stadium, Hamilton. At the end of the 2012 season, he scored 7 tries, which meant he was joint 10th with 4 other players on the leading try scorers table.

In October 2013, he was named in the Fiji team to their 2013 end-of-year tour.

On 5 June 2014, Tikoirotuma officially joined Harlequins in England on a two-year contract. However, he was granted early release to join Premiership rivals London Irish for the forthcoming 2015–16 season.
