= Tawera Kerr-Barlow =

Australian-born New Zealand rugby union rugby player

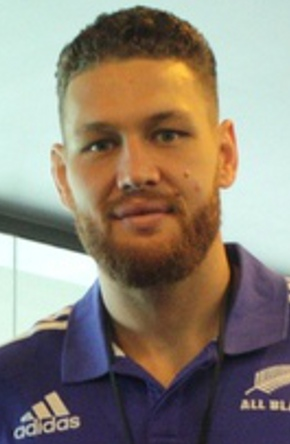
- Kerr-Barlow during a function, June 2016
- Born: Tawera Narada James Kerr-Barlow; 15 August 1990 (age 36) Melbourne, Victoria, Australia
- Height: 1.87 m (6 ft 1 1/2 in)
- Weight: 91 kg (14 st 5 lb)
- School: Hamilton Boys' High School

Rugby union career
- Position: Scrum-half
- Current team: La Rochelle
Senior career
Years	Team	Apps	(Points)
2009–2017	Waikato	34	(15)
2017−2025	La Rochelle	185	(190)
2025−	Stade Français	8	(5)
- Correct as of 26 November 2025
Super Rugby
Years	Team	Apps	(Points)
2011–2017	Chiefs	82	(50)
- Correct as of 29 July 2017
International career
Years	Team	Apps	(Points)
2010	New Zealand U20	5	(5)
2012–2017	New Zealand	29	(10)
2015–2017	Maori All Blacks	4	(0)
- Correct as of 14 November 2017

Tawera Narada James Kerr-Barlow (born 15 August 1990) is an Australian-born New Zealand rugby union rugby player. His regular playing position is scrum-half. He plays for Stade Français in the Top 14. Kerr-Barlow represented New Zealand under 20 in the 2010 IRB Junior World Championship. He is a key member of 2015 Rugby World Cup winning team.

== Career ==
Kerr-Barlow began his professional rugby career in 2009 when he made his debut for Waikato at 18 years old. Kerr-Barlow was eventually signed to the Chiefs, making his debut for them in 2011 and became a regular starter for both teams.

Kerr-Barlow was first selected for the All Blacks to go on the end-of-year tour in 2012. Kerr-Barlow made his international debut in a 51-22 win over Scotland, replacing veteran Piri Weepu in his 69th test with 19 minutes to go. Kerr-Barlow also came off the bench to replace Aaron Smith in a win against Italy the following week. Kerr-Barlow cemented his spot as a regular back-up for Smith off the bench in 2013, replacing Smith off the bench eleven times that year. Kerr-Barlow also earned his first test start in 2013, starting against Japan on the end of year tour. Kerr-Barlow was subbed off with 12 minutes left and the All Blacks went on to win 54-6.

After coming on as a replacement, he scored his first two international tries in the quarter-final victory against France, which New Zealand won by 62-13. This marked a remarkable return from injury to play in the Rugby World Cup 2015. Kerr-Barlow's injury trouble in 2014 and 2015 was covered by the likes of Andy Ellis and Brad Weber before the World Cup started. The double that Kerr-Barlow scored against France were his only international tries in his career.

After good form continued in 2016, Kerr-Barlow continued playing for New Zealand, replacing TJ Perenara off the bench for the Rugby Championship. Kerr-Barlow earned his second career start against Italy on the end of year tour, leading the Haka against the Italians for his first and only time. Kerr-Barlow was released by New Zealand to play for the Māori All Blacks against the United States the week before, starting for them in Chicago. Kerr-Barlow was also released to play against the British & Irish Lions with the Māori All Blacks in Rotorua on 17 June 2017. Kerr-Barlow had a disappointing performance, being yellow carded in the 48th minute for a dangerous tackle.

Kerr-Barlow announced that he would leave New Zealand after the 2017 Rugby Championship to play for La Rochelle in France. Kerr-Barlow played his final game for the Chiefs following a quarter final 27-13 defeat to the Crusaders in Christchurch.

Kerr-Barlow was named in the 2017 Rugby Championship squad, coming off the bench in wins against Argentina and South Africa. Kerr-Barlow played his final two matches for New Zealand on the 2017 end-of-year tour, starting against a French XV, and led the Haka for his final appearance in a black jersey. Kerr-Barlow played the majority of the match before making way for All Blacks debutant Mitchell Drummond with ten minutes left.

On 15 March 2017, Kerr-Barlow travelled to France to sign for Top 14 side La Rochelle from the 2017-18 season.

In August 2022, Kerr-Barlow announced he was willing to switch allegiances to the Wallabies to play for his country of birth, taking advantage of World Rugby's new eligibility rules.

On 11 June 2025, Kerr-Barlow would sign for French rivals Stade Français Paris in the same league for the 2025-26 season, after being released by La Rochelle.

== Honours ==
Chiefs

- Super Rugby
  - (gold) Winner (2): 2012, 2013

La Rochelle

- European Rugby Champions Cup
  - (gold) Winner (2): 2021–22, 2022–23
  - (silver) Runner-up (1): 2020–21
- European Rugby Challenge Cup
  - (silver) Runner-up (1): 2018-19
- Top 14
  - (silver) Runner-up (2): 2020-21, 2022-23

New Zealand

- Rugby World Cup
  - (gold) Winner (1): 2015
- The Rugby Championship
  - (gold) Winner (4): 2013, 2014, 2016, 2017

New Zealand U20

- IRB Junior World Championship
  - (gold) Winner (1): 2010
