= List of 2014–15 Super Rugby transfers =

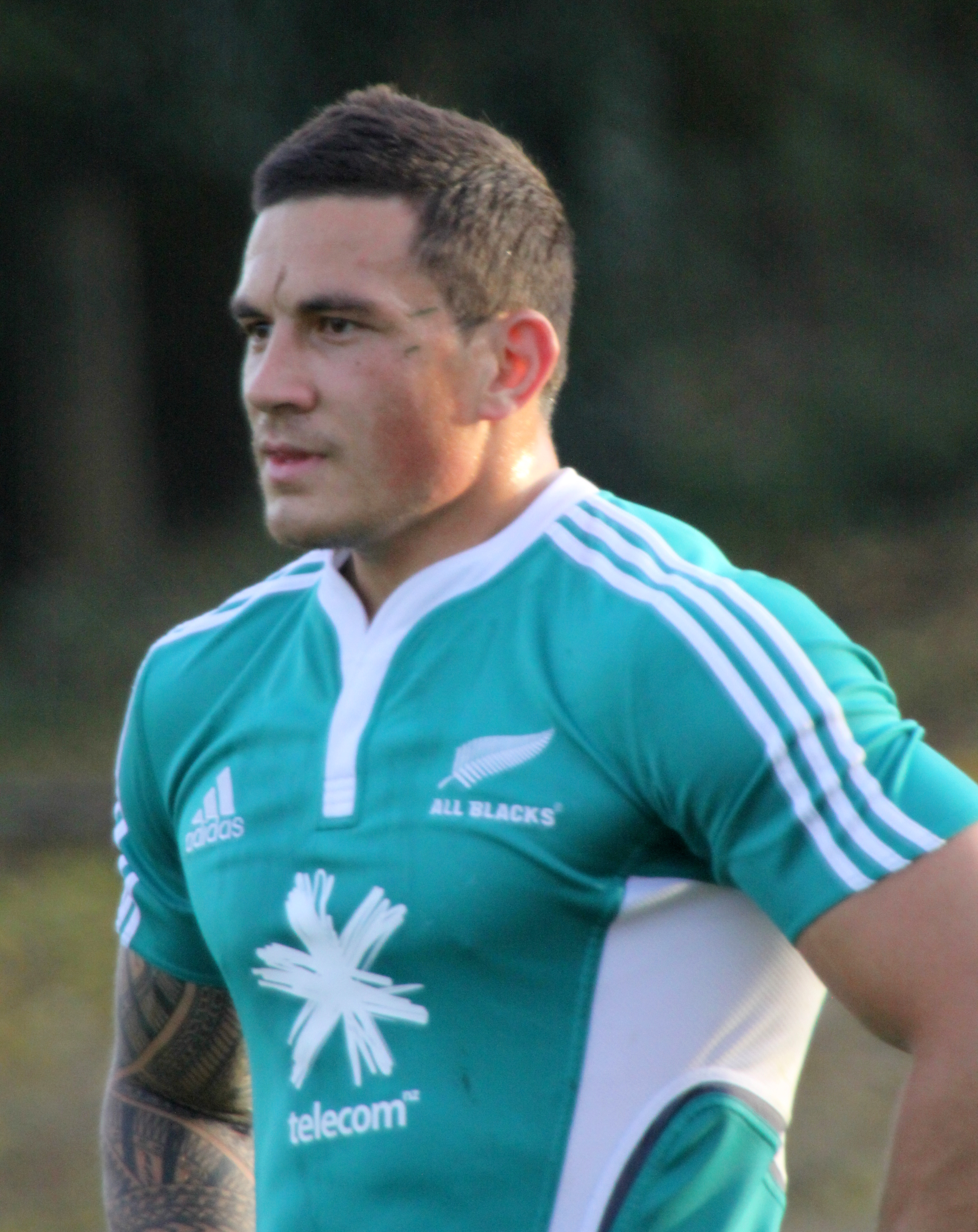
Sonny Bill Williams signed a two-year deal to rejoin the Chiefs for the 2015 and 2016 Super Rugby seasons.

This is a list of player signings and releases involving Super Rugby teams prior to the end of the 2015 Super Rugby season. The release of a player that was included in a 2014 Super Rugby season squad, or the signing of a new player for the 2015 season is listed here regardless of when it occurred. Players that have been confirmed for the 2015 season are also listed, regardless of when they signed for the team.

Australian and New Zealand teams name their squads for the 2015 season – typically containing 30 players – in late 2014. Many sides also name additional players that train in backup or development squads for the franchises. These players are denoted by (wider training group) for New Zealand teams, or (extended playing squad) for Australian teams. In South Africa, all teams have affiliated provincial sides playing in their domestic Vodacom Cup competition.

Notes:

- 2014 players listed are all players that were named in the initial senior squad, or subsequently included in a 23-man match day squad at any game during the season.
- (did not play) denotes that a player did not play at all during one of the two seasons due to injury or non-selection. These players are included to indicate they were contracted to the team.
- (short-term) denotes that a player wasn't initially contracted, but came in during the season. This could either be a club rugby player coming in as injury cover, or a player whose contract had expired at another team (typically in the northern hemisphere).
- Flags are only shown for players moving to or from another country.
- Players may play in several positions, but are listed in only one.

== Australia ==
=== Brumbies ===
Brumbies transfers 2014–15
Pos	2014 squad	Out	In	2015 squad
PR	Allan Alaalatoa (extended playing squad); Ben Alexander; Ruaidhri Murphy; Scott Sio; JP Smith (extended playing squad); Ruan Smith	(substituted off) Ruaidhri Murphy (to (Ireland) Ulster)	(substituted on) Leslie Leulua’iali’i-Makin (from University of Canberra Vikings)	Allan Alaalatoa; Ben Alexander; Leslie Leulua’iali’i-Makin (did not play); Scott Sio; JP Smith; Ruan Smith
HK	Luke Holmes (short-term); Joshua Mann-Rea; Stephen Moore; Siliva Siliva	(substituted off) Luke Holmes (to North Harbour Rays)		Joshua Mann-Rea; Stephen Moore; Siliva Siliva (did not play)
LK	Sam Carter; Scott Fardy; Leon Power; Tom Staniforth (short-term); Jack Whetton	(substituted off) Leon Power (to (France) Oyonnax); (substituted off) Jack Whetton (to (New Zealand) Auckland)	(substituted on) Rory Arnold (from University of Canberra Vikings); (substituted on) Blake Enever (from Queensland Country)	Rory Arnold; Sam Carter; Blake Enever; Scott Fardy; Tom Staniforth (did not play)
FL	Fotu Auelua; Jarrad Butler; Tom McVerry (short-term); David Pocock; Jordan Smiler	(substituted off) Tom McVerry (to GPS Rugby)	(substituted on) Sean Doyle (from (Ireland) Ulster)	Fotu Auelua (did not play); Jarrad Butler; Sean Doyle; David Pocock; Jordan Smiler
N8	Lachlan McCaffrey (extended playing squad); Ben Mowen	(substituted off) Lachlan McCaffrey (to (England) London Welsh); (substituted off) Ben Mowen (to (France) Montpellier)	(substituted on) Ita Vaea (from NSW Country Eagles)	Ita Vaea
SH	Michael Dowsett (extended playing squad); Conrad Hoffmann; Nic White	(substituted off) Conrad Hoffmann (to (South Africa) Sharks)	(substituted on) Joe Powell (from Tuggeranong Vikings)	Michael Dowsett; Joe Powell (short-term); Nic White
FH	Lionel Cronjé; Matt To'omua	(substituted off) Lionel Cronjé (to (South Africa) Sharks)		Matt To'omua
CE	Rodney Iona (short-term); Tevita Kuridrani; Christian Lealiifano; Pat McCabe; Andrew Smith	(substituted off) Pat McCabe (retired); (substituted off) Andrew Smith (to (Ireland) Munster)	(substituted on) Nigel Ah Wong (from (Japan) Coca-Cola Red Sparks)	Nigel Ah Wong; Rodney Iona; Tevita Kuridrani; Christian Lealiifano
WG	Clyde Rathbone; Henry Speight; Joe Tomane; Stephan van der Walt (extended playing squad, did not play)	(substituted off) Clyde Rathbone (retired); (substituted off) Stephan van der Walt (to Easts Tigers)	(substituted on) James Dargaville (from Sydney Stars); (substituted on) Lausii Taliauli (from University of Canberra Vikings)	James Dargaville; Henry Speight; Lausii Taliauli; Joe Tomane
FB	Robbie Coleman; Jesse Mogg			Robbie Coleman; Jesse Mogg
Coach	Stephen Larkham			Stephen Larkham

=== Force ===
Force transfers 2014–15
Pos	2014 squad	Out	In	2015 squad
PR	Pekahou Cowan; Tetera Faulkner; Chris Heiberg (did not play); Ollie Hoskins (wider training group); Kieran Longbottom; Salesi Manu (did not play); Francois van Wyk (wider training group)	(substituted off) Kieran Longbottom (to (England) Saracens F.C.); (substituted off) Salesi Manu (to (Italy) Benetton Treviso)	(substituted on) Guy Millar (from Greater Sydney Rams)	Pekahou Cowan; Tetera Faulkner; Chris Heiberg; Ollie Hoskins; Guy Millar (wider training group); Francois van Wyk (extended playing squad)
HK	Nathan Charles; Heath Tessmann			Nathan Charles; Heath Tessmann
LK	Phoenix Battye; Adam Coleman (extended playing squad); Wilhelm Steenkamp; Sam Wykes	(substituted off) Phoenix Battye (to (France) Béziers)	(substituted on) Rory Walton (from extended playing squad)	Adam Coleman; Wilhelm Steenkamp; Rory Walton; Sam Wykes
FL	Chris Alcock; Angus Cottrell; Matt Hodgson; Ryan Hodson (short-term); Hugh McMeniman; Brynard Stander	(substituted off) Ryan Hodson (returned to Jersey); (substituted off) Hugh McMeniman (to (Japan) Honda Heat)	(substituted on) Ross Haylett-Petty (from Perth Spirit); (substituted on) Kane Koteka (from Perth Spirit); (substituted on) Steve Mafi (from (England) Leicester Tigers)	Chris Alcock; Angus Cottrell; Matt Hodgson; Ross Haylett-Petty (extended playing squad); Kane Koteka (short-term); Steve Mafi; Brynard Stander
N8	Ben McCalman			Ben McCalman
SH	Alby Mathewson; Ian Prior; Justin Turner (short-term)		(substituted on) Ryan Louwrens (from extended playing squad)	Ryan Louwrens (extended playing squad); Alby Mathewson; Ian Prior; Justin Turner (short-term)
FH	Sias Ebersohn; Kyle Godwin; Zack Holmes			Sias Ebersohn; Kyle Godwin; Zack Holmes
CE	Marcel Brache; Luke Burton (extended playing squad); Patrick Dellit; Jayden Hayward; Junior Rasolea; Chris Tuatara-Morrison	(substituted off) Jayden Hayward (to (Italy) Benetton Treviso); (substituted off) Chris Tuatara-Morrison (to (France) Castres)		Marcel Brache; Luke Burton; Patrick Dellit; Junior Rasolea
WG	Nick Cummins; Dane Haylett-Petty; Ed Stubbs (did not play)	(substituted off) Ed Stubbs (to NSW Country Eagles)	(substituted on) Mitchell Scott (from (New Zealand) Tasman); (substituted on) Akihito Yamada (from (Japan) Panasonic Wild Knights)	Nick Cummins; Dane Haylett-Petty; Mitchell Scott; Akihito Yamada (did not play)
FB	Dillyn Leyds (wider training group); Luke Morahan	(substituted off) Dillyn Leyds (to (South Africa) Stormers)	(substituted on) Albert Nikoro (from (New Zealand) Blues)	Luke Morahan; Albert Nikoro (did not play)
Coach	Michael Foley			Michael Foley

=== Rebels ===
Rebels transfers 2014–15
Pos	2014 squad	Out	In	2015 squad
PR	Cruze Ah-Nau (extended playing squad); Eddie Aholelei (did not play); Paul Alo-Emile; Max Lahiff; Toby Smith; Laurie Weeks	(substituted off) Eddie Aholelei (to (England) London Welsh); (substituted off) Max Lahiff (to (England) Bath)	(substituted on) Keita Inagaki (from (Japan) Panasonic Wild Knights); (substituted on) Tim Metcher (from NSW Country Eagles)	Cruze Ah-Nau; Paul Alo-Emile; Keita Inagaki; Tim Metcher (extended playing squad); Toby Smith; Laurie Weeks
HK	Steve Fualau (short-term); Shota Horie; Patrick Leafa (extended playing squad); Tom Sexton (did not play)	(substituted off) Steve Fualau (to (France) Béziers); (substituted off) Shota Horie (to (Japan) Panasonic Wild Knights)	(substituted on) Ben Whittaker (from (France) Biarritz)	Patrick Leafa; Tom Sexton; Ben Whittaker
LK	Sam Jeffries (extended playing squad); Luke Jones; Cadeyrn Neville; Hugh Pyle; Chris Thomson (did not play)	(substituted off) Hugh Pyle (to (France) Stade Français); (substituted off) Chris Thomson (retired)	(substituted on) Steve Cummins (from Eastwood)	Steve Cummins (extended playing squad); Sam Jeffries; Luke Jones; Cadeyrn Neville
FL	Colby Fainga'a; Scott Fuglistaller; Scott Higginbotham; Sean McMahon (extended playing squad); Jordy Reid			Colby Fainga'a; Scott Fuglistaller; Scott Higginbotham; Sean McMahon; Jordy Reid
N8	Lopeti Timani		(substituted on) Radike Samo (from (Japan) Kintetsu Liners)	Radike Samo; Lopeti Timani
SH	Luke Burgess; Josh Holmes (short-term); Ben Meehan (extended playing squad); Nic Stirzaker	(substituted off) Josh Holmes (to North Harbour Rays)		Luke Burgess; Ben Meehan; Nic Stirzaker
FH	Jack Debreczeni (extended playing squad); Angus Roberts	(substituted off) Angus Roberts (to Sydney Stars)		Jack Debreczeni
CE	Tamati Ellison; Tom English; Lalakai Foketi (extended playing squad); Mitch Inman; Lachlan Mitchell; Male Sa'u (short-term)	(substituted off) Lalakai Foketi (to (France) Bayonne); (substituted off) Lachlan Mitchell (retired); (substituted off) Male Sa'u (returned to (Japan) Yamaha Júbilo)	(substituted on) Mike Harris (from Reds); (substituted on) Sefa Naivalu (from Melbourne Rising)	Tamati Ellison; Tom English; Mike Harris; Mitch Inman; Sefa Naivalu
WG	Tom Kingston; Telusa Veainu		(substituted on) Cam Crawford (from Waratahs); (substituted on) Dom Shipperley (from Reds)	Cam Crawford; Tom Kingston (did not play); Dom Shipperley; Telusa Veainu
FB	Bryce Hegarty; Alex Rokobaro; Jason Woodward	(substituted off) Alex Rokobaro (to (Italy) Rugby Calvisano); (substituted off) Jason Woodward (to (New Zealand) Hurricanes)	(substituted on) Jonah Placid (from Reds)	Bryce Hegarty; Jonah Placid
Coach	Tony McGahan			Tony McGahan

=== Reds ===
Reds transfers 2014–15
Pos	2014 squad	Out	In	2015 squad
PR	Ben Daley; Sef Fa'agase (wider training squad, did not play); Greg Holmes; Jono Owen; Pettowa Paraka (wider training squad, did not play); James Slipper	(substituted off) Jono Owen (to (France) Grenoble)	(substituted on) Sam Talakai (from Brisbane City)	Ben Daley; Sef Fa'agase (elite development squad); Greg Holmes; Pettowa Paraka (elite development squad); James Slipper; Sam Talakai (elite development squad)
HK	Albert Anae; Saia Fainga'a; James Hanson; Andrew Ready (wider training squad, did not play)	(substituted off) Albert Anae (to (Italy) Benetton Treviso)		Saia Fainga'a; James Hanson; Andrew Ready (extended playing squad)
LK	James Horwill; David McDuling; Ed O'Donoghue; Rob Simmons		(substituted on) Marco Kotze (from Brisbane City); (substituted on) Tom Murday (from Blues wider training group)	James Horwill; Marco Kotze (elite development squad); David McDuling; Tom Murday (short-term); Ed O'Donoghue; Rob Simmons
FL	Curtis Browning; Tim Buchanan (short-term); Liam Gill; Eddie Quirk; Beau Robinson	(substituted off) Tim Buchanan (to Brisbane City)	(substituted on) Michael Gunn (from Brisbane City); (substituted on) Adam Korczyk (from Brisbane City); (substituted on) Adam Thomson (from (Japan) Canon Eagles)	Curtis Browning; Liam Gill; Michael Gunn (elite development squad); Adam Korczyk (elite development squad); Eddie Quirk (did not play); Beau Robinson; Adam Thomson
N8	Jake Schatz		(substituted on) Lolo Fakaosilea (from Queensland Country); (substituted on) Hendrik Tui (from (Japan) Suntory Sungoliath)	Lolo Fakaosilea (extended playing squad); Jake Schatz; Hendrik Tui
SH	Nick Frisby; Scott Gale (wider training group); Will Genia			Nick Frisby; Scott Gale (short-term); Will Genia
FH	Quade Cooper; Ben Lucas	(substituted off) Ben Lucas (to (France) Montpellier)	(substituted on) Sam Greene (from Brisbane City); (substituted on) Jake McIntyre (from Brisbane City); (substituted on) Duncan Paia'aua (from Brisbane Broncos)	Quade Cooper; Sam Greene (short-term); Jake McIntyre (elite development squad); Duncan Paia'aua
CE	Anthony Fainga'a; Mike Harris; Sam Johnson (wider training group); Samu Kerevi (extended playing squad); Ben Tapuai; Aidan Toua	(substituted off) Mike Harris (to Rebels); (substituted off) Aidan Toua (to Agen)	(substituted on) Campbell Magnay (from Queensland Country)	Anthony Fainga'a; Sam Johnson (elite development squad); Samu Kerevi; Campbell Magnay; Ben Tapuai
WG	Chris Feauai-Sautia; Chris Kuridrani (extended playing squad); Dom Shipperley; Lachlan Turner	(substituted off) Dom Shipperley (to Rebels)	(substituted on) Tom Banks (from Reds U20); (substituted on) James O'Connor (from (France) Toulon)	Tom Banks (short-term); Chris Feauai-Sautia; Chris Kuridrani; James O'Connor; Lachlan Turner
FB	Rod Davies; Jonah Placid (wider training squad); JJ Taulagi	(substituted off) Rod Davies (to (France) Biarritz); (substituted off) Jonah Placid (to Rebels)	(substituted on) Karmichael Hunt (from Gold Coast FC)	Karmichael Hunt; JJ Taulagi
Coach	Richard Graham			Richard Graham

=== Waratahs ===
Waratahs transfers 2014–15
Pos	2014 squad	Out	In	2015 squad
PR	Michael Alaalatoa (short-term); Sekope Kepu; Benn Robinson; Paddy Ryan; Jeremy Tilse			Michael Alaalatoa (did not play); Sekope Kepu; Benn Robinson; Paddy Ryan; Jeremy Tilse
HK	Tolu Latu; Tatafu Polota-Nau; Hugh Roach (short-term)		(substituted on) Dave Porecki (from North Harbour Rays)	Tolu Latu; Tatafu Polota-Nau; Dave Porecki (short-term); Hugh Roach
LK	Kane Douglas (did not play); Jed Holloway; Will Skelton	(substituted off) Kane Douglas (to (Ireland) Leinster)	(substituted on) Sam Lousi (from New Zealand Warriors); (substituted on) Dean Mumm (from (England) Exeter Chiefs)	Jed Holloway (did not play); Sam Lousi; Dean Mumm (short-term); Will Skelton
FL	Mitchell Chapman; Dave Dennis; Tala Gray; Michael Hooper; Pat McCutcheon; Jacques Potgieter		(substituted on) Jack Dempsey (from North Harbour Rays)	Mitchell Chapman; Jack Dempsey (short-term); Dave Dennis; Tala Gray; Michael Hooper; Pat McCutcheon; Jacques Potgieter
N8	Stephen Hoiles (short-term); Wycliff Palu			Stephen Hoiles; Wycliff Palu
SH	Brendan McKibbin; Nick Phipps		(substituted on) Auvasa Faleali'i (from Greater Sydney Rams)	Auvasa Faleali'i (did not play); Brendan McKibbin; Nick Phipps
FH	Bernard Foley		(substituted on) David Horwitz (from extended playing squad)	Bernard Foley; David Horwitz (did not play)
CE	Matthew Carraro; Israel Folau; Michael Hodge (did not play); Rob Horne; Jono Lance	(substituted off) Michael Hodge (to Sydney Stars)		Matthew Carraro; Israel Folau; Rob Horne; Jono Lance
WG	Alofa Alofa (extended playing squad); Adam Ashley-Cooper; Peter Betham; Taqele Naiyaravoro (short-term)	(substituted off) Alofa Alofa (to (France) La Rochelle)	(substituted on) Andrew Kellaway (from NSW Country Eagles)	Adam Ashley-Cooper; Peter Betham; Andrew Kellaway (did not play); Taqele Naiyaravoro
FB	Kurtley Beale; Cam Crawford; Ben Volavola (did not play)	(substituted off) Cam Crawford (to Rebels)		Kurtley Beale; Ben Volavola (did not play)
Coach	Michael Cheika			Michael Cheika

== New Zealand ==
=== Blues ===
Blues transfers 2014–15
Pos	2014 squad	Out	In	2015 squad
PR	Charlie Faumuina; Tom McCartney; Sam Prattley; Angus Ta'avao; Ofa Tu'ungafasi; Tony Woodcock	(substituted off) Tom McCartney (to (Ireland) Connacht)	(substituted on) Sione Mafileo (from North Harbour); (substituted on) Nic Mayhew (from North Harbour); (substituted on) Greg Pleasants-Tate (from North Harbour)	Charlie Faumuina; Sione Mafileo (short-term); Nic Mayhew (short-term); Greg Pleasants-Tate (wider training group); Sam Prattley; Angus Ta'avao; Ofa Tu'ungafasi; Tony Woodcock
HK	Keven Mealamu; James Parsons		(substituted on) Matt Moulds (from Northland)	Keven Mealamu; Matt Moulds (wider training group); James Parsons
LK	Tom Donnelly; Liaki Moli; Hayden Triggs; Patrick Tuipulotu	(substituted off) Tom Donnelly (to (France) Montpellier); (substituted off) Liaki Moli (to Auckland)	(substituted on) Josh Bekhuis (from Highlanders); (substituted on) William Lloyd (from Auckland); (substituted on) Culum Retallick (from Bay of Plenty); (substituted on) Chris Vui (from North Harbour)	Josh Bekhuis; William Lloyd (wider training group); Culum Retallick; Hayden Triggs; Patrick Tuipulotu; Chris Vui (short-term)
FL	Kane Barrett (did not play); Luke Braid; Jerome Kaino; Steve Luatua; Jordan Manihera (short-term); Brendon O'Connor	(substituted off) Kane Barrett (to Taranaki); (substituted off) Jordan Manihera (to North Harbour)	(substituted on) Joe Edwards (from Auckland); (substituted on) Blake Gibson (from Auckland); (substituted on) Jack Ram (from Northland)	Luke Braid; Joe Edwards; Blake Gibson (wider training group); Jerome Kaino; Steve Luatua; Brendon O'Connor; Jack Ram (short-term)
N8	Peter Saili	(substituted off) Peter Saili (to (France) Bordeaux)	(substituted on) Airi Hunt (from Auckland); (substituted on) Akira Ioane (from New Zealand Sevens)	Airi Hunt (short-term); Akira Ioane
SH	Jamison Gibson-Park; Bryn Hall; Sonatane Takulua (short-term, did not play); Piri Weepu	(substituted off) Sonatane Takulua (to Northland); (substituted off) Piri Weepu (to (England) London Welsh)	(substituted on) Jamie Booth (from Manawatu); (substituted on) Jimmy Cowan (from (England) Gloucester)	Jamie Booth (short-term, did not play); Jimmy Cowan; Jamison Gibson-Park; Bryn Hall (did not play)
FH	Simon Hickey (wider training group); Baden Kerr (did not play); Chris Noakes; Ihaia West (short-term)	(substituted off) Baden Kerr (to (England) Saracens); (substituted off) Chris Noakes (to (England) London Irish)	(substituted on) Daniel Bowden (from (England) Leicester Tigers); (substituted on) Matt McGahan (from Auckland)	Daniel Bowden; Simon Hickey; Matt McGahan (short-term); Ihaia West
CE	Pita Ahki; Ma'a Nonu; Francis Saili; Jackson Willison	(substituted off) Ma'a Nonu (to Hurricanes); (substituted off) Jackson Willison (to (France) Grenoble)	(substituted on) Hamish Northcott (from Manawatu); (substituted on) Matt Vaega (from North Harbour)	Pita Ahki; Hamish Northcott; Francis Saili; Matt Vaega (wider training group)
WG	Frank Halai; Tevita Li (wider training group); George Moala; Albert Nikoro (wider training group); Lolagi Visinia	(substituted off) Albert Nikoro (to (Australia) Force)	(substituted on) Ben Lam (from Auckland); (substituted on) Melani Nanai (from Auckland)	Frank Halai; Ben Lam; Tevita Li; George Moala; Melani Nanai (wider training group); Lolagi Visinia
FB	Benji Marshall; Charles Piutau	(substituted off) Benji Marshall (to (Australia) St. George Illawarra Dragons)		Charles Piutau
Coach	John Kirwan			John Kirwan

=== Chiefs ===
Chiefs transfers 2014–15
Pos	2014 squad	Out	In	2015 squad
PR	Ben Afeaki; Nick Barrett (wider training group); Josh Hohneck; Jamie Mackintosh; Pauliasi Manu; Ben Tameifuna	(substituted off) Ben Afeaki (retired); (substituted off) Nick Barrett (to Auckland); (substituted off) Josh Hohneck (to Highlanders)	(substituted on) Jarrod Firth (from Counties Manukau); (substituted on) Mitchell Graham (from Taranaki); (substituted on) Siate Tokolahi (from Canterbury)	Jarrod Firth (short-term); Mitchell Graham; Jamie Mackintosh; Pauliasi Manu; Ben Tameifuna; Siate Tokolahi
HK	Hika Elliot (did not play); Nathan Harris (short term); Rhys Marshall; Mahonri Schwalger	(substituted off) Nathan Harris (injured); (substituted off) Mahonri Schwalger (retired)	(substituted on) Quentin MacDonald (from (Ireland) Munster)	Hika Elliot; Quentin MacDonald; Rhys Marshall
LK	Michael Fitzgerald; Brodie Retallick; Matt Symons		(substituted on) Brian Alainu'uese (from Waikato); (substituted on) Michael Allardice (from Hawke's Bay)	Brian Alainu'uese (short-term); Michael Allardice; Michael Fitzgerald; Brodie Retallick; Matt Symons
FL	Sam Cane; Nick Crosswell; Ross Filipo; Tevita Koloamatangi (wider training group); Tanerau Latimer; Liam Messam	(substituted off) Nick Crosswell (to (Wales) Newport Gwent Dragons); (substituted off) Tanerau Latimer (to (Japan) Toshiba Brave Lupus)	(substituted on) Johan Bardoul (from Waikato); (substituted on) Mitchell Crosswell (from Taranaki); (substituted on) Sean Polwart (from Auckland)	Johan Bardoul; Sam Cane; Mitchell Crosswell (short-term); Ross Filipo (short-term); Tevita Koloamatangi; Liam Messam; Sean Polwart
N8	Liam Squire; Kane Thompson	(substituted off) Kane Thompson (to (England) Newcastle Falcons)	(substituted on) Michael Leitch (from (Japan) Toshiba Brave Lupus); (substituted on) Ma'ama Vaipulu (from Counties Manukau)	Michael Leitch; Liam Squire; Ma'ama Vaipulu (wider training group)
SH	Tawera Kerr-Barlow; Augustine Pulu; Brad Weber (wider training group)	(substituted off) Tawera Kerr-Barlow (injured)	(substituted on) Kayne Hammington (from Manawatu)	Kayne Hammington (short-term, did not play); Augustine Pulu; Brad Weber
FH	Aaron Cruden			Aaron Cruden
CE	Bundee Aki; Robbie Fruean; Anton Lienert-Brown (wider training group); Charlie Ngatai; Jordan Payne (short-term); Dwayne Sweeney (short term)	(substituted off) Bundee Aki (to (Ireland) Connacht); (substituted off) Robbie Fruean (to Crusaders); (substituted off) Jordan Payne (to Waikato); (substituted off) Dwayne Sweeney (returned to (Japan) Fukuoka Sanix Blues)	(substituted on) Seta Tamanivalu (from Taranaki); (substituted on) Sonny Bill Williams (from (Australia) Sydney Roosters)	Anton Lienert-Brown (wider training group); Charlie Ngatai; Seta Tamanivalu; Sonny Bill Williams
WG	James Lowe; Tom Marshall; Tim Nanai-Williams; Asaeli Tikoirotuma	(substituted off) Asaeli Tikoirotuma (to (England) Harlequins)	(substituted on) Hosea Gear (from (Japan) Honda Heat); (substituted on) Bryce Heem (from Tasman)	Hosea Gear; Bryce Heem; James Lowe; Tom Marshall; Tim Nanai-Williams
FB	Gareth Anscombe; Andrew Horrell; Mils Muliaina; Robbie Robinson (did not play)	(substituted off) Gareth Anscombe (to (Wales) Cardiff Blues); (substituted off) Mils Muliaina (to (Ireland) Connacht); (substituted off) Robbie Robinson (to North Harbour)	(substituted on) Damian McKenzie (from Waikato); (substituted on) Marty McKenzie (from Southland)	Andrew Horrell; Damian McKenzie; Marty McKenzie (wider training group)
Coach	Dave Rennie			Dave Rennie

=== Crusaders ===
Crusaders transfers 2014–15
Pos	2014 squad	Out	In	2015 squad
PR	Wyatt Crockett; Owen Franks; Nepo Laulala; Daniel Lienert-Brown (short-term); Joe Moody; Tim Perry	(substituted off) Daniel Lienert-Brown (to Highlanders)	(substituted on) Alex Hodgman (from Canterbury)	Wyatt Crockett; Owen Franks; Alex Hodgman (wider training group); Nepo Laulala; Joe Moody; Tim Perry
HK	Corey Flynn; Ben Funnell; Codie Taylor	(substituted off) Corey Flynn (to (France) Toulouse)	(substituted on) Ged Robinson (from Highlanders)	Ben Funnell; Ged Robinson (did not play); Codie Taylor
LK	Scott Barrett (short-term); Dominic Bird; Luke Romano; Sam Whitelock			Scott Barrett; Dominic Bird; Luke Romano; Sam Whitelock
FL	Richie McCaw; Jordan Taufua; Matt Todd; Jimmy Tupou; George Whitelock; Luke Whitelock	(substituted off) George Whitelock (to (Japan) Panasonic Wild Knights)		Richie McCaw; Jordan Taufua; Matt Todd; Jimmy Tupou; Luke Whitelock
N8	Kieran Read			Kieran Read
SH	Mitchell Drummond; Andy Ellis; Willi Heinz		(substituted on) Billy Guyton (from Hurricanes)	Mitchell Drummond; Andy Ellis; Billy Guyton (short-term); Willi Heinz (did not play)
FH	Tyler Bleyendaal; Dan Carter; Colin Slade; Tom Taylor	(substituted off) Tyler Bleyendaal (to (Ireland) Munster)		Dan Carter; Colin Slade; Tom Taylor
CE	Ryan Crotty; Kieron Fonotia (wider training group); Rey Lee-Lo; Rob Thompson (wider training group); Adam Whitelock	(substituted off) Rey Lee-Lo (to Hurricanes); (substituted off) Rob Thompson (to Canterbury); (substituted off) Adam Whitelock (to (France) Bayonne)	(substituted on) Robbie Fruean (from Chiefs); (substituted on) David Havili (from Tasman)	Ryan Crotty; Kieron Fonotia; Robbie Fruean; David Havili (wider training group)
WG	Zac Guildford (did not play); Johnny McNicholl; Nemani Nadolo; Nafi Tuitavake (wider training group)	(substituted off) Zac Guildford (to (France) Clermont)	(substituted on) Nathaniel Apa (from Canterbury); (substituted on) Jone Macilai-Tori (from Northland)	Nathaniel Apa (wider training group); Jone Macilai-Tori; Johnny McNicholl; Nemani Nadolo; Nafi Tuitavake
FB	Israel Dagg			Israel Dagg
Coach	Todd Blackadder			Todd Blackadder

=== Highlanders ===
Highlanders transfers 2014–15
Pos	2014 squad	Out	In	2015 squad
PR	Matías Díaz; Ma'afu Fia; Kane Hames; Chris King; JP Koen (short-term); Craig Millar (wider training group); Aki Seiuli (short-term, did not play)	(substituted off) Matías Díaz (to (England) Bristol); (substituted off) Chris King (to (France) Montpellier); (substituted off) JP Koen (returned to Southland); (substituted off) Craig Millar (to Otago); (substituted off) Aki Seiuli (returned to Otago)	(substituted on) Brendon Edmonds (from Hurricanes); (substituted on) Ross Geldenhuys (from Tasman); (substituted on) Josh Hohneck (from Chiefs); (substituted on) Daniel Lienert-Brown (from Crusaders); (substituted on) Pingi Tala'apitaga (from Bay of Plenty)	Brendon Edmonds; Ma'afu Fia; Ross Geldenhuys; Kane Hames; Josh Hohneck; Daniel Lienert-Brown (short-term); Pingi Tala'apitaga
HK	Sam Anderson-Heather (short-term); Liam Coltman; Brayden Mitchell; Ged Robinson (wider training group)	(substituted off) Sam Anderson-Heather (to wider training group); (substituted off) Brayden Mitchell (to Hurricanes); (substituted off) Ged Robinson (to Crusaders)	(substituted on) Ash Dixon (from Hurricanes)	Liam Coltman; Ash Dixon
LK	Josh Bekhuis; Tom Franklin; Jarrad Hoeata; Brad Thorn; Joe Wheeler	(substituted off) Josh Bekhuis (to Blues); (substituted off) Jarrad Hoeata (to (Wales) Cardiff Blues); (substituted off) Brad Thorn (to (England) Leicester Tigers)	(substituted on) Alex Ainley (from Tasman); (substituted on) Jackson Hemopo (from Otago); (substituted on) Joe Latta (from Otago); (substituted on) Mark Reddish (from Hurricanes)	Alex Ainley; Tom Franklin; Jackson Hemopo (short-term); Joe Latta (wider training group); Mark Reddish; Joe Wheeler
FL	Lee Allan (wider training group); Shane Christie; Gareth Evans; John Hardie; TJ Ioane	(substituted off) Lee Allan (to wider training group); (substituted off) TJ Ioane (to (England) Sale Sharks)	(substituted on) James Lentjes (from Otago); (substituted on) Dan Pryor (from Northland)	Shane Christie; Gareth Evans; John Hardie; James Lentjes (short-term); Dan Pryor
N8	Elliot Dixon; Nasi Manu			Elliot Dixon; Nasi Manu
SH	Aaron Smith; Fumiaki Tanaka; Frae Wilson (did not play)	(substituted off) Frae Wilson (to Hurricanes)	(substituted on) Scott Eade (from Southland); (substituted on) Josh Renton (from Otago)	Scott Eade (short-term); Josh Renton (wider training group); Aaron Smith; Fumiaki Tanaka
FH	Hayden Parker; Willie Ripia (did not play); Lima Sopoaga	(substituted off) Willie Ripia (to Wellington)	(substituted on) Marty Banks (from Hurricanes)	Marty Banks; Hayden Parker; Lima Sopoaga
CE	Phil Burleigh; Jason Emery; Malakai Fekitoa; Winston Stanley; Shaun Treeby	(substituted off) Phil Burleigh (to (Scotland) Edinburgh Rugby); (substituted off) Winston Stanley (to (England) Harlequins)		Jason Emery; Malakai Fekitoa; Shaun Treeby
WG	Richard Buckman (wider training group); Patrick Osborne; Trent Renata (wider training group)		(substituted on) Waisake Naholo (from Taranaki); (substituted on) Ryan Tongia (from Hawke's Bay)	Richard Buckman; Waisake Naholo; Patrick Osborne; Trent Renata; Ryan Tongia (wider training group)
FB	Kurt Baker; Ben Smith			Kurt Baker; Ben Smith
Coach	Jamie Joseph			Jamie Joseph

=== Hurricanes ===
Hurricanes transfers 2014–15
Pos	2014 squad	Out	In	2015 squad
PR	Brendon Edmonds (wider training group); Chris Eves (wider training group); Ben Franks; Reggie Goodes; John Schwalger; Eric Sione (did not play); Jeffery Toomaga-Allen	(substituted off) Brendon Edmonds (to Highlanders); (substituted off) Eric Sione (to Wellington)	(substituted on) Tolu Fahamokioa (from Wellington); (substituted on) Ben May (from (Japan) Fukuoka Sanix Blues)	Chris Eves; Tolu Fahamokioa (short-term); Ben Franks; Reggie Goodes; Ben May; John Schwalger (did not play); Jeffery Toomaga-Allen
HK	Dane Coles; Ash Dixon; Motu Matu'u	(substituted off) Ash Dixon (to Highlanders)	(substituted on) Brayden Mitchell (from Highlanders)	Dane Coles; Motu Matu'u; Brayden Mitchell (short-term)
LK	Mark Abbott; James Broadhurst; Mark Reddish; Jeremy Thrush	(substituted off) Mark Reddish (to Highlanders)	(substituted on) Geoffrey Cridge (from Hawke's Bay); (substituted on) Vaea Fifita (from Wellington); (substituted on) Christian Lloyd (from Wellington)	Mark Abbott; James Broadhurst; Geoffrey Cridge (did not play); Vaea Fifita (short-term); Christian Lloyd (did not play); Jeremy Thrush
FL	Adam Hill (wider training group); Jack Lam; Faifili Levave; Ardie Savea; Brad Shields	(substituted off) Jack Lam (to (England) Bristol Rugby); (substituted off) Faifili Levave (to (Japan) Toyota Verblitz)	(substituted on) Callum Gibbins (from Manawatu); (substituted on) Iopu Iopu-Aso (from Taranaki)	Callum Gibbins; Adam Hill (wider training group); Iopu Iopu-Aso (did not play); Ardie Savea; Brad Shields
N8	Blade Thomson; Victor Vito			Blade Thomson; Victor Vito
SH	Billy Guyton (wider training group); TJ Perenara; Chris Smylie	(substituted off) Billy Guyton (to Crusaders)	(substituted on) Frae Wilson (from Highlanders)	TJ Perenara; Chris Smylie; Frae Wilson (wider training group)
FH	Marty Banks; Beauden Barrett; James Marshall	(substituted off) Marty Banks (to Highlanders)	(substituted on) Otere Black (from Manawatu)	Beauden Barrett; Otere Black (wider training group); James Marshall
CE	Tim Bateman; Hadleigh Parkes; Conrad Smith; Cardiff Vaega	(substituted off) Tim Bateman (to (Japan) Coca-Cola Red Sparks); (substituted off) Hadleigh Parkes (to (Wales) Scarlets); (substituted off) Cardiff Vaega (to Southland)	(substituted on) Vince Aso (from Auckland); (substituted on) Willis Halaholo (from Southland); (substituted on) Rey Lee-Lo (from Crusaders); (substituted on) Ma'a Nonu (from Blues)	Vince Aso (did not play); Willis Halaholo; Rey Lee-Lo; Ma'a Nonu; Conrad Smith
WG	Cory Jane; Alapati Leiua; Matt Proctor; Julian Savea	(substituted off) Alapati Leiua (to (England) Wasps)		Cory Jane; Matt Proctor; Julian Savea
FB	Andre Taylor	(substituted off) Andre Taylor (to (Japan) Kintetsu Liners)	(substituted on) Sam McNicol (from Wellington); (substituted on) Nehe Milner-Skudder (from Manawatu); (substituted on) Jason Woodward (from (Australia) Rebels)	Sam McNicol (wider training group); Nehe Milner-Skudder; Jason Woodward
Coach	Mark Hammett	(substituted off) Mark Hammett (to (Wales) Cardiff Blues)	(substituted on) Chris Boyd (from Wellington)	Chris Boyd

== South Africa ==
=== Bulls ===
Bulls transfers 2014–15
Pos	2014 squad	Out	In	2015 squad
PR	Dean Greyling; Frik Kirsten; Werner Kruger; Morné Mellett; Marcel van der Merwe	(substituted off) Frik Kirsten (retired)	(substituted on) Andrew Beerwinkel (from Blue Bulls); (substituted on) Trevor Nyakane (from Cheetahs); (substituted on) Dayan van der Westhuizen (from Blue Bulls); (substituted on) Hencus van Wyk (from Blue Bulls)	Andrew Beerwinkel (did not play); Dean Greyling; Werner Kruger; Morné Mellett; Trevor Nyakane; Marcel van der Merwe; Dayan van der Westhuizen (did not play); Hencus van Wyk (did not play)
HK	Bandise Maku; Bongi Mbonambi; Callie Visagie	(substituted off) Bongi Mbonambi (to Stormers)	(substituted on) Adriaan Strauss (from Cheetahs); (substituted on) Jaco Visagie (from Blue Bulls)	Bandise Maku (did not play); Adriaan Strauss; Callie Visagie; Jaco Visagie
LK	David Bulbring (did not play); Grant Hattingh; Nico Janse van Rensburg; Victor Matfield; Marvin Orie; Flip van der Merwe; Paul Willemse	(substituted off) David Bulbring (to Eastern Province Kings); (substituted off) Paul Willemse (to (France) Grenoble)	(substituted on) RG Snyman (from Blue Bulls)	Grant Hattingh; Nico Janse van Rensburg; Victor Matfield; Marvin Orie (did not play); RG Snyman (did not play); Flip van der Merwe
FL	Arno Botha (did not play); Jacques du Plessis; Wiaan Liebenberg; Dewald Potgieter (short-term); Roelof Smit; Deon Stegmann; Wimpie van der Walt (short-term)	(substituted off) Dewald Potgieter (returned to (Japan) Yamaha Júbilo); (substituted off) Wimpie van der Walt (returned to (Japan) NTT DoCoMo Red Hurricanes)	(substituted on) Lappies Labuschagné (from Cheetahs); (substituted on) Nardus van der Walt (from Blue Bulls)	Arno Botha; Jacques du Plessis; Lappies Labuschagné; Wiaan Liebenberg (did not play); Roelof Smit; Deon Stegmann; Nardus van der Walt (did not play)
N8	Jacques Engelbrecht; Jono Ross; Pierre Spies	(substituted off) Jono Ross (to (France) Stade Français)	(substituted on) Hanro Liebenberg (from Blue Bulls)	Jacques Engelbrecht (did not play); Hanro Liebenberg; Pierre Spies
SH	Francois Hougaard; Rudy Paige; Piet van Zyl			Francois Hougaard; Rudy Paige; Piet van Zyl
FH	Louis Fouché; Handré Pollard; Jacques-Louis Potgieter	(substituted off) Louis Fouché (to (Japan) Ricoh Black Rams)	(substituted on) Tian Schoeman (from Blue Bulls)	Handré Pollard; Jacques-Louis Potgieter; Tian Schoeman
CE	JJ Engelbrecht; Waylon Murray (did not play); Jan Serfontein; William Small-Smith	(substituted off) Waylon Murray (to Sharks)	(substituted on) Ryan Nell (from Blue Bulls); (substituted on) Burger Odendaal (from Blue Bulls)	JJ Engelbrecht; Ryan Nell (did not play); Burger Odendaal; Jan Serfontein; William Small-Smith (did not play)
WG	Bjorn Basson; Travis Ismaiel (did not play); Sampie Mastriet; Akona Ndungane	(substituted off) Sampie Mastriet (to Lions)	(substituted on) Jamba Ulengo (from South Africa Sevens)	Bjorn Basson; Travis Ismaiel; Akona Ndungane (did not play); Jamba Ulengo (did not play)
FB	Ulrich Beyers; Clayton Blommetjies (did not play); Jesse Kriel; Jurgen Visser	(substituted off) Ulrich Beyers (to (France) Bordeaux); (substituted off) Clayton Blommetjies (to Cheetahs)	(substituted on) Warrick Gelant (from Blue Bulls); (substituted on) Duncan Matthews (from Blue Bulls)	Warrick Gelant (did not play); Jesse Kriel; Duncan Matthews (did not play); Jurgen Visser
Coach	Frans Ludeke			Frans Ludeke

=== Cheetahs ===
Cheetahs transfers 2014–15
Pos	2014 squad	Out	In	2015 squad
PR	Luan de Bruin; Rossouw de Klerk; Trevor Nyakane; Caylib Oosthuizen; Coenie Oosthuizen; Nick Schonert (did not play); Kevin Stevens; Maks van Dyk	(substituted off) Luan de Bruin (to Free State Cheetahs); (substituted off) Rossouw de Klerk (to (Scotland) Glasgow Warriors); (substituted off) Trevor Nyakane (to Bulls); (substituted off) Nick Schonert (to (England) Worcester Warriors); (substituted off) Kevin Stevens (to Free State Cheetahs)	(substituted on) Dolph Botha (from Free State Cheetahs); (substituted on) Danie Mienie (from Sharks (Currie Cup)); (substituted on) BG Uys (from Eastern Province Kings); (substituted on) Ewald van der Westhuizen (from Griquas)	Dolph Botha; Danie Mienie; Caylib Oosthuizen; Coenie Oosthuizen; BG Uys; Ewald van der Westhuizen; Maks van Dyk
HK	Ryno Barnes; Martin Bezuidenhout (did not play); Hercú Liebenberg (did not play); Adriaan Strauss; Torsten van Jaarsveld	(substituted off) Ryno Barnes (to Free State Cheetahs); (substituted off) Hercú Liebenberg (retired); (substituted off) Adriaan Strauss (to Bulls)	(substituted on) Stephan Coetzee (from Western Province); (substituted on) Elandré Huggett (from UFS Shimlas)	Martin Bezuidenhout (did not play); Stephan Coetzee; Elandré Huggett; Torsten van Jaarsveld
LK	Lood de Jager; Andries Ferreira; Ligtoring Landman; Hilton Lobberts; Boela Serfontein; Francois Uys; Waltie Vermeulen; Carl Wegner	(substituted off) Andries Ferreira (to (Italy) Zebre); (substituted off) Ligtoring Landman (to (Wales) Newport Gwent Dragons); (substituted off) Hilton Lobberts (to Griquas); (substituted off) Waltie Vermeulen (retired)	(substituted on) Armandt Koster (from Griffons); (substituted on) Steven Sykes (from Eastern Province Kings)	Lood de Jager; Armandt Koster (did not play); Boela Serfontein (did not play); Steven Sykes (short-term); Francois Uys; Carl Wegner
FL	Heinrich Brüssow; Carel Greeff; Lappies Labuschagné; Oupa Mohojé; Boom Prinsloo; Philip van der Walt; Henco Venter	(substituted off) Lappies Labuschagné (to Bulls); (substituted off) Philip van der Walt (to (France) Biarritz)	(substituted on) Jonathan Adendorf (from Griquas); (substituted on) Willie Britz (from Lions); (substituted on) Tienie Burger (from Free State Cheetahs); (substituted on) Gerhard Olivier (from UFS Shimlas)	Jonathan Adendorf (did not play); Willie Britz; Heinrich Brüssow; Tienie Burger; Carel Greeff; Oupa Mohojé; Gerhard Olivier; Boom Prinsloo; Henco Venter
N8	Jean Cook		(substituted on) Niell Jordaan (from UFS Shimlas)	Jean Cook; Niell Jordaan
SH	Renier Botha (did not play); Kevin Luiters (did not play); Tian Meyer; Sarel Pretorius; Shaun Venter	(substituted off) Kevin Luiters (to Eastern Province Kings)		Renier Botha; Tian Meyer; Sarel Pretorius; Shaun Venter
FH	Francois Brummer (did not play); Johan Goosen; Riaan Smit; Elgar Watts	(substituted off) Johan Goosen (to (France) Racing Métro); (substituted off) Riaan Smit (to (France) Oyonnax)	(substituted on) Willie du Plessis (from Golden Lions); (substituted on) Niel Marais (from UFS Shimlas); (substituted on) Joe Pietersen (from (France) Biarritz)	Francois Brummer; Willie du Plessis; Niel Marais; Joe Pietersen; Elgar Watts (did not play)
CE	Piet Lindeque (did not play); Howard Mnisi; Johann Sadie; Francois Venter	(substituted off) Piet Lindeque (retired); (substituted off) Howard Mnisi (to Lions)	(substituted on) JW Jonker (from Lions); (substituted on) Michael van der Spuy (from Western Province)	JW Jonker (did not play); Johann Sadie; Michael van der Spuy; Francois Venter
WG	Rayno Benjamin; Cornal Hendricks; Rocco Jansen (did not play); Raymond Rhule	(substituted off) Rocco Jansen (to Griquas)	(substituted on) Danie Dames (from Griquas); (substituted on) Sergeal Petersen (from Eastern Province Kings)	Rayno Benjamin; Danie Dames; Cornal Hendricks; Sergeal Petersen; Raymond Rhule
FB	Hennie Daniller; Willie le Roux; Gouws Prinsloo (did not play)	(substituted off) Hennie Daniller (to (Italy) Zebre); (substituted off) Gouws Prinsloo (to Griquas)	(substituted on) Clayton Blommetjies (from Bulls); (substituted on) Coenie van Wyk (from Pumas)	Clayton Blommetjies; Willie le Roux; Coenie van Wyk
Coach	Naka Drotské		(substituted on) Franco Smith (from UFS Shimlas)	Naka Drotské; Franco Smith

=== Lions ===
Lions transfers 2014–15
Pos	2014 squad	Out	In	2015 squad
PR	Ruan Dreyer; Corné Fourie; Charles Marais; Julian Redelinghuys; Schalk van der Merwe; Jacques van Rooyen	(substituted off) Charles Marais (to Eastern Province Kings)		Ruan Dreyer; Corné Fourie; Julian Redelinghuys; Schalk van der Merwe; Jacques van Rooyen
HK	Robbie Coetzee; Malcolm Marx; Mark Pretorius; Akker van der Merwe; Willie Wepener	(substituted off) Willie Wepener (to Golden Lions)		Robbie Coetzee; Malcolm Marx; Mark Pretorius; Akker van der Merwe
LK	MB Lusaseni; Rudi Mathee; Franco Mostert; Martin Muller; Franco van der Merwe	(substituted off) Rudi Mathee (to Pumas); (substituted off) Franco van der Merwe (to (Ireland) Ulster)	(substituted on) JP du Preez (from Golden Lions); (substituted on) Andries Ferreira (from (Italy) Zebre); (substituted on) Robert Kruger (from Leopards)	JP du Preez; Andries Ferreira; Robert Kruger; MB Lusaseni; Franco Mostert; Martin Muller
FL	Willie Britz; Stephan de Wit; Jaco Kriel; Derick Minnie; Warren Whiteley	(substituted off) Willie Britz (to Cheetahs)	(substituted on) Ruaan Lerm (from Golden Lions); (substituted on) Kwagga Smith (from Golden Lions)	Stephan de Wit (did not play); Jaco Kriel; Ruaan Lerm; Derick Minnie; Kwagga Smith; Warren Whiteley
N8	Warwick Tecklenburg			Warwick Tecklenburg
SH	Michael Bondesio (did not play); Ross Cronjé; Faf de Klerk	(substituted off) Michael Bondesio (retired)	(substituted on) Lohan Jacobs (from Bulls); (substituted on) Dillon Smit (from Leopards)	Ross Cronjé; Faf de Klerk; Lohan Jacobs; Dillon Smit
FH	Marnitz Boshoff; Elton Jantjies		(substituted on) Jaco van der Walt (from Golden Lions)	Marnitz Boshoff; Elton Jantjies; Jaco van der Walt
CE	Stokkies Hanekom; Alwyn Hollenbach; JW Jonker; Lionel Mapoe; Stefan Watermeyer	(substituted off) JW Jonker (to Cheetahs); (substituted off) Stefan Watermeyer (to Pumas)	(substituted on) Howard Mnisi (from Cheetahs); (substituted on) Harold Vorster (from Golden Lions)	Stokkies Hanekom; Alwyn Hollenbach; Lionel Mapoe; Howard Mnisi; Harold Vorster
WG	Chrysander Botha; Deon Helberg (did not play); Courtnall Skosan; Deon van Rensburg; Anthony Volmink	(substituted off) Chrysander Botha (to (England) Exeter Chiefs); (substituted off) Deon Helberg (to Golden Lions); (substituted off) Deon van Rensburg (retired)	(substituted on) Sampie Mastriet (from Bulls); (substituted on) Mark Richards (from Golden Lions)	Sampie Mastriet; Mark Richards; Courtnall Skosan; Anthony Volmink
FB	Andries Coetzee; Ruan Combrinck; Coenie van Wyk	(substituted off) Coenie van Wyk (to Cheetahs)		Andries Coetzee; Ruan Combrinck
Coach	Johan Ackermann			Johan Ackermann

=== Sharks ===
Sharks transfers 2014–15
Pos	2014 squad	Out	In	2015 squad
PR	Lourens Adriaanse; Dale Chadwick; Jannie du Plessis; Thomas du Toit; Wiehahn Herbst; Tendai Mtawarira	(substituted off) Wiehahn Herbst (to (Ireland) Ulster)	(substituted on) Matt Stevens (from (England) Saracens)	Lourens Adriaanse; Dale Chadwick; Jannie du Plessis; Thomas du Toit; Tendai Mtawarira; Matt Stevens
HK	Kyle Cooper; Bismarck du Plessis; Monde Hadebe (did not play); Franco Marais			Kyle Cooper; Bismarck du Plessis; Monde Hadebe; Franco Marais
LK	Anton Bresler; Pieter-Steph du Toit; Stephan Lewies; Peet Marais (did not play); Etienne Oosthuizen	(substituted off) Anton Bresler (to (Scotland) Edinburgh); (substituted off) Peet Marais (to (France) Brive)	(substituted on) Mouritz Botha (from (England) Saracens); (substituted on) Giant Mtyanda (from Pumas); (substituted on) Marco Wentzel (from Sharks (Currie Cup))	Mouritz Botha; Pieter-Steph du Toit; Stephan Lewies; Giant Mtyanda; Etienne Oosthuizen; Marco Wentzel
FL	Willem Alberts; Jacques Botes; Marcell Coetzee; Jean Deysel; Tera Mtembu	(substituted off) Jacques Botes (retired)	(substituted on) Dan du Preez (from Sharks (Currie Cup)); (substituted on) Khaya Majola (from Sharks (Currie Cup))	Willem Alberts; Marcell Coetzee; Jean Deysel; Dan du Preez; Khaya Majola; Tera Mtembu
N8	Keegan Daniel; Ryan Kankowski	(substituted off) Keegan Daniel (to (Japan) Kubota Spears)	(substituted on) Renaldo Bothma (from Pumas)	Renaldo Bothma; Ryan Kankowski
SH	Charl McLeod; Cobus Reinach; Stefan Ungerer	(substituted off) Charl McLeod (to (France) Grenoble)	(substituted on) Michael Claassens (from (France) Toulon); (substituted on) Conrad Hoffmann (from (Australia) Brumbies); (substituted on) Cameron Wright (from Sharks (Currie Cup))	Michael Claassens (did not play); Conrad Hoffmann; Cobus Reinach; Stefan Ungerer; Cameron Wright
FH	Hansie Graaff (did not play); Patrick Lambie; Tim Swiel; Fred Zeilinga	(substituted off) Hansie Graaff (to Eastern Province Kings); (substituted off) Tim Swiel (to Sharks (Currie Cup))	(substituted on) Lionel Cronjé (from (Australia) Brumbies)	Lionel Cronjé; Patrick Lambie; Fred Zeilinga
CE	André Esterhuizen; Tyler Fisher (did not play); Paul Jordaan; François Steyn; Heimar Williams	(substituted off) Tyler Fisher (to Sharks (Currie Cup)); (substituted off) Paul Jordaan (to Sharks (Currie Cup))	(substituted on) Waylon Murray (from Bulls)	André Esterhuizen; Waylon Murray; François Steyn; Heimar Williams
WG	Tonderai Chavhanga; Lwazi Mvovo; Odwa Ndungane; JP Pietersen; S'bura Sithole	(substituted off) Tonderai Chavhanga (to Sharks (Currie Cup))	(substituted on) Paul Perez (from Eastern Province Kings); (substituted on) Jack Wilson (from (England) Saracens)	Lwazi Mvovo; Odwa Ndungane; Paul Perez (did not play); JP Pietersen; S'bura Sithole; Jack Wilson
FB	SP Marais; Jaco van Tonder	(substituted off) Jaco van Tonder (to Sharks (Currie Cup))		SP Marais
Coach	Jake White	(substituted off) Jake White (to Tonga (technical adviser))	(substituted on) Gary Gold (from (Japan) Kobelco Steelers)	Gary Gold

=== Stormers ===
Stormers transfers 2014–15
Pos	2014 squad	Out	In	2015 squad
PR	Pat Cilliers; Brok Harris; Oli Kebble; Steven Kitshoff; Frans Malherbe; Sti Sithole; Alistair Vermaak	(substituted off) Pat Cilliers (to (France) Montpellier); (substituted off) Brok Harris (to (Wales) Newport Gwent Dragons); (substituted off) Sti Sithole (to Western Province)	(substituted on) Vincent Koch (from Pumas); (substituted on) Wilco Louw (from Blue Bulls)	Oli Kebble; Steven Kitshoff; Vincent Koch; Wilco Louw; Frans Malherbe; Alistair Vermaak
HK	Stephan Coetzee; Martin Dreyer; Deon Fourie; Tiaan Liebenberg; Scarra Ntubeni; Mike Willemse	(substituted off) Stephan Coetzee (to Griquas); (substituted off) Martin Dreyer (to Boland Cavaliers); (substituted off) Deon Fourie (to (France) Lyon); (substituted off) Tiaan Liebenberg (retired)	(substituted on) Bongi Mbonambi (from Bulls); (substituted on) Neil Rautenbach (from Western Province)	Bongi Mbonambi; Scarra Ntubeni; Neil Rautenbach; Mike Willemse
LK	Ruan Botha; Manuel Carizza; Eben Etzebeth (did not play); Tazz Fuzani (did not play); Jean Kleyn; De Kock Steenkamp; Jurie van Vuuren	(substituted off) Tazz Fuzani (to Eastern Province Kings); (substituted off) De Kock Steenkamp (to (Wales) Ospreys)	(substituted on) Jan de Klerk (from Western Province)	Ruan Botha; Manuel Carizza; Jan de Klerk; Eben Etzebeth; Jean Kleyn; Jurie van Vuuren
FL	Schalk Burger; Rynhardt Elstadt; Rohan Kitshoff; Siya Kolisi; Sikhumbuzo Notshe; Michael Rhodes	(substituted off) Rohan Kitshoff (to Western Province)		Schalk Burger; Rynhardt Elstadt; Siya Kolisi; Sikhumbuzo Notshe; Michael Rhodes
N8	Nizaam Carr; Duane Vermeulen			Nizaam Carr; Duane Vermeulen
SH	Dylon Frylinck; Nic Groom; Godlen Masimla (did not play); Louis Schreuder	(substituted off) Dylon Frylinck (to Pumas)		Nic Groom; Godlen Masimla; Louis Schreuder
FH	Demetri Catrakilis; Kurt Coleman; Ryno Eksteen; Peter Grant; Gary van Aswegen (did not play)	(substituted off) Peter Grant (to (France) La Rochelle); (substituted off) Gary van Aswegen (to Eastern Province Kings)	(substituted on) Robert du Preez (from Western Province)	Demetri Catrakilis; Kurt Coleman; Robert du Preez; Ryno Eksteen (did not play)
CE	Damian de Allende; Juan de Jongh; Jean de Villiers; Jaco Taute; Michael van der Spuy	(substituted off) Michael van der Spuy (to Cheetahs)	(substituted on) Huw Jones (from Western Province)	Damian de Allende; Juan de Jongh; Jean de Villiers (did not play); Huw Jones; Jaco Taute
WG	Gio Aplon; Seabelo Senatla; Sailosi Tagicakibau (short-term); Devon Williams; Kobus van Wyk	(substituted off) Gio Aplon (to (France) Grenoble); (substituted off) Sailosi Tagicakibau (returned to (England) London Irish); (substituted off) Devon Williams (to Western Province)	(substituted on) Patrick Howard (from Western Province); (substituted on) Johnny Kôtze (from Western Province); (substituted on) Dillyn Leyds (from Force)	Patrick Howard; Johnny Kôtze; Dillyn Leyds; Seabelo Senatla; Kobus van Wyk
FB	Cheslin Kolbe		(substituted on) EW Viljoen (from Western Province)	Cheslin Kolbe; EW Viljoen (did not play)
Coach	Allister Coetzee			Allister Coetzee

== See also ==
- List of 2013–14 Super Rugby transfers
- SANZAAR
- Super Rugby franchise areas
- List of 2014–15 Premiership Rugby transfers
- List of 2014–15 Pro12 transfers
- List of 2014–15 Top 14 transfers
- List of 2014–15 RFU Championship transfers
