= List of 2015–16 Super Rugby transfers (New Zealand) =

This is a list of player signings and releases involving Super Rugby teams in New Zealand prior to the end of the 2016 Super Rugby season. The release of a player that was included in a 2015 Super Rugby season squad, or the signing of a new player for the 2016 season is listed here regardless of when it occurred. Players that have been confirmed for the 2016 season are also listed, regardless of when they signed for the team.

Notes:

- 2015 players listed are all players that were named in the initial senior squad, or subsequently included in a 23-man match day squad at any game during the season.
- (did not play) denotes that a player did not play at all during one of the two seasons due to injury or non-selection. These players are included to indicate they were contracted to the team.
- (short-term) denotes that a player wasn't initially contracted, but came in during the season. This could either be a club rugby player coming in as injury cover, or a player whose contract had expired at another team (typically in the northern hemisphere).
- Flags are only shown for players moving to or from another country.
- Players may play in several positions, but are listed in only one.

== Blues ==
Blues transfers 2015–16
Pos	2015 squad	Out	In	2016 squad
PR	Charlie Faumuina; Sione Mafileo (short-term); Nic Mayhew (short-term); Greg Pleasants-Tate (wider training group); Sam Prattley; Angus Ta'avao; Ofa Tu'ungafasi; Tony Woodcock	(substituted off) Greg Pleasants-Tate (to Highlanders wider training group); (substituted off) Angus Ta'avao (to (Australia) Waratahs); (substituted off) Tony Woodcock (retired)	(substituted on) Namatahi Waa (from Northland)	Charlie Faumuina; Sione Mafileo; Nic Mayhew; Sam Prattley; Ofa Tu'ungafasi; Namatahi Waa (wider training group)
HK	Keven Mealamu; Matt Moulds (wider training group); James Parsons	(substituted off) Keven Mealamu (retired)	(substituted on) Quentin MacDonald (from Chiefs)	Quentin MacDonald; Matt Moulds; James Parsons
LK	Josh Bekhuis; William Lloyd (wider training group); Culum Retallick; Hayden Triggs; Patrick Tuipulotu; Chris Vui (short-term)	(substituted off) William Lloyd (to Auckland); (substituted off) Culum Retallick (to (Australia) Rebels); (substituted off) Hayden Triggs (to (Ireland) Leinster); (substituted off) Chris Vui (returned to North Harbour)	(substituted on) Gerard Cowley-Tuioti (from North Harbour); (substituted on) Hoani Matenga (from Wellington); (substituted on) Scott Scrafton (from Auckland)	Josh Bekhuis; Gerard Cowley-Tuioti; Hoani Matenga; Scott Scrafton (wider training group); Patrick Tuipulotu
FL	Luke Braid; Joe Edwards; Blake Gibson (wider training group); Jerome Kaino; Steve Luatua; Brendon O'Connor; Jack Ram (short-term)	(substituted off) Luke Braid (to (France) Bordeaux); (substituted off) Brendon O'Connor (to (England) Leicester Tigers)	(substituted on) Tanerau Latimer (from (Japan) Toshiba Brave Lupus); (substituted on) Kara Pryor (from Northland)	Joe Edwards (wider training group); Blake Gibson; Jerome Kaino; Tanerau Latimer; Steve Luatua; Kara Pryor; Jack Ram
N8	Airi Hunt (short-term); Akira Ioane	(substituted off) Airi Hunt (to Auckland)		Akira Ioane
SH	Jamie Booth (short-term, did not play); Jimmy Cowan; Jamison Gibson-Park; Bryn Hall (did not play)	(substituted off) Jamie Booth (returned to Manawatu); (substituted off) Jimmy Cowan (to Tasman); (substituted off) Jamison Gibson-Park (to Hurricanes)	(substituted on) Billy Guyton (from Crusaders); (substituted on) Sam Nock (from Northland)	Billy Guyton; Bryn Hall; Sam Nock
FH	Daniel Bowden; Simon Hickey; Matt McGahan (short-term); Ihaia West	(substituted off) Daniel Bowden (to (England) Bath); (substituted off) Simon Hickey (to (France) Bordeaux)	(substituted on) Piers Francis (from Counties Manukau)	Matt McGahan; Piers Francis (wider training group); Ihaia West
CE	Pita Ahki; Hamish Northcott; George Moala; Francis Saili; Matt Vaega (wider training group)	(substituted off) Pita Ahki (to Hurricanes); (substituted off) Hamish Northcott (to Manawatu); (substituted off) Francis Saili (to (Ireland) Munster)	(substituted on) TJ Faiane (from Auckland); (substituted on) Rieko Ioane (from Auckland); (substituted on) Rene Ranger (from (France) Montpellier); (substituted on) Male Sa'u (from (Japan) Yamaha Júbilo)	TJ Faiane (wider training group, did not play); Rieko Ioane; George Moala; Rene Ranger; Male Sa'u; Matt Vaega (wider training group)
WG	Frank Halai; Ben Lam; Tevita Li; Melani Nanai (wider training group)	(substituted off) Frank Halai (to (England) Wasps)	(substituted on) Matt Duffie (from (Australia) Melbourne Storm); (substituted on) Afa Fa'atau (from Wellington)	Matt Duffie; Afa Fa'atau (wider training group, did not play); Ben Lam (did not play); Tevita Li; Melani Nanai
FB	Charles Piutau; Lolagi Visinia	(substituted off) Charles Piutau (to (England) Wasps)	(substituted on) Michael Little (from North Harbour); (substituted on) Jordan Trainor (from Waikato)	Michael Little (wider training group, did not play); Lolagi Visinia; Jordan Trainor (wider training group, did not play)
Coach	John Kirwan	(substituted off) John Kirwan (resigned)	(substituted on) Tana Umaga (from Counties Manukau)	Tana Umaga

== Chiefs ==
Chiefs transfers 2015–16
Pos	2015 squad	Out	In	2016 squad
PR	Jarrod Firth (short-term); Mitchell Graham; Jamie Mackintosh; Pauliasi Manu; Ben Tameifuna; Siate Tokolahi	(substituted off) Jarrod Firth (returned to Counties Manukau); (substituted off) Jamie Mackintosh (to Southland); (substituted off) Ben Tameifuna (to (France) Racing 92)	(substituted on) Siegfried Fisiihoi (from Bay of Plenty); (substituted on) Nepo Laulala (from Crusaders); (substituted on) Kane Hames (from Tasman); (substituted on) Atunaisa Moli (from Waikato); (substituted on) Hiroshi Yamashita (from (Japan) Kobelco Steelers)	Siegfried Fisiihoi (wider training group); Mitchell Graham; Kane Hames (short-term); Nepo Laulala (did not play); Pauliasi Manu; Atunaisa Moli; Siate Tokolahi; Hiroshi Yamashita
HK	Hika Elliot; Quentin MacDonald; Rhys Marshall	(substituted off) Quentin MacDonald (to Blues)	(substituted on) Nathan Harris (return from injury)	Hika Elliot; Nathan Harris; Rhys Marshall (wider training group)
LK	Brian Alainu'uese (short-term); Michael Allardice; Michael Fitzgerald; Brodie Retallick; Matt Symons	(substituted off) Brian Alainu'uese (returned to Waikato); (substituted off) Michael Fitzgerald (to (England) Leicester Tigers); (substituted off) Matt Symons (to (England) London Irish)	(substituted on) Dominic Bird (from Crusaders); (substituted on) James Tucker (from Waikato)	Michael Allardice; Dominic Bird; Brodie Retallick; James Tucker (wider training group)
FL	Johan Bardoul; Sam Cane; Mitchell Crosswell (short-term); Ross Filipo (short-term); Tevita Koloamatangi; Liam Messam; Sean Polwart	(substituted off) Mitchell Crosswell (returned to Taranaki); (substituted off) Ross Filipo (to (France) Racing 92); (substituted off) Sean Polwart (to Auckland)	(substituted on) Lachlan Boshier (from Taranaki); (substituted on) Sam Henwood (from Counties Manukau); (substituted on) Mitchell Karpik (from Auckland); (substituted on) Tom Sanders (from Canterbury); (substituted on) Taleni Seu (from Auckland)	Johan Bardoul; Lachlan Boshier (short-term); Sam Cane; Sam Henwood; Mitchell Karpik (did not play); Tevita Koloamatangi; Liam Messam (short-term); Tom Sanders; Taleni Seu
N8	Michael Leitch; Liam Squire; Ma'ama Vaipulu (wider training group)	(substituted off) Liam Squire (to Highlanders)	(substituted on) Mitchell Brown (from Taranaki)	Mitchell Brown (short-term); Michael Leitch; Ma'ama Vaipulu
SH	Kayne Hammington (short-term, did not play); Augustine Pulu; Brad Weber		(substituted on) Tawera Kerr-Barlow (return from injury)	Kayne Hammington (short-term); Tawera Kerr-Barlow; Augustine Pulu (did not play); Brad Weber
FH	Aaron Cruden		(substituted on) Stephen Donald (from (Japan) Mitsubishi Sagamihara DynaBoars)	Aaron Cruden; Stephen Donald (wider training group)
CE	Anton Lienert-Brown (wider training group); Charlie Ngatai; Seta Tamanivalu; Sonny Bill Williams		(substituted on) Sam Vaka (from Counties Manukau)	Anton Lienert-Brown; Charlie Ngatai; Seta Tamanivalu; Sam Vaka (wider training group); Sonny Bill Williams (did not play)
WG	Hosea Gear; Bryce Heem; James Lowe; Tom Marshall; Tim Nanai-Williams	(substituted off) Hosea Gear (to (France) Clermont); (substituted off) Bryce Heem (to (England) Worcester Warriors); (substituted off) Tom Marshall (to (England) Gloucester); (substituted off) Tim Nanai-Williams (to (Japan) Ricoh Black Rams)	(substituted on) Glen Fisiiahi (from New Zealand Warriors); (substituted on) Toni Pulu (from wider training squad); (substituted on) Shaun Stevenson (from Waikato); (substituted on) Chase Tiatia (from Bay of Plenty); (substituted on) Latu Vaeno (from Taranaki)	Glen Fisiiahi; James Lowe; Toni Pulu; Shaun Stevenson (wider training group); Chase Tiatia (did not play); Latu Vaeno (wider training group)
FB	Andrew Horrell; Damian McKenzie; Marty McKenzie (wider training group)	(substituted off) Marty McKenzie (to Crusaders)	(substituted on) Sam McNicol (from Hurricanes)	Andrew Horrell; Damian McKenzie; Sam McNicol
Coach	Dave Rennie			Dave Rennie

== Crusaders ==
Crusaders transfers 2015–16
Pos	2015 squad	Out	In	2016 squad
PR	Wyatt Crockett; Owen Franks; Alex Hodgman (wider training group); Nepo Laulala; Joe Moody; Tim Perry	(substituted off) Nepo Laulala (to Chiefs)	(substituted on) Michael Alaalatoa (from (Australia) Waratahs)	Michael Alaalatoa; Wyatt Crockett; Owen Franks; Alex Hodgman; Joe Moody; Tim Perry (wider training group, did not play)
HK	Ben Funnell; Ged Robinson (did not play); Codie Taylor			Ben Funnell; Ged Robinson; Codie Taylor
LK	Scott Barrett; Dominic Bird; Luke Romano; Jimmy Tupou; Sam Whitelock	(substituted off) Dominic Bird (to Chiefs)	(substituted on) Mitchell Dunshea (from Canterbury)	Scott Barrett; Mitchell Dunshea (wider training group, did not play); Luke Romano; Jimmy Tupou; Sam Whitelock
FL	Richie McCaw; Jordan Taufua; Matt Todd; Luke Whitelock	(substituted off) Richie McCaw (retired); (substituted off) Luke Whitelock (to Highlanders)	(substituted on) Jed Brown (from Canterbury); (substituted on) Tim Boys (from Southland); (substituted on) Reed Prinsep (from Canterbury); (substituted on) Pete Samu (from Tasman)	Jed Brown (wider training group, did not play); Tim Boys; Reed Prinsep (short-term); Pete Samu; Jordan Taufua; Matt Todd
N8	Kieran Read			Kieran Read
SH	Mitchell Drummond; Andy Ellis; Billy Guyton (short-term); Willi Heinz (did not play)	(substituted off) Billy Guyton (to Blues); (substituted off) Willi Heinz (to (England) Gloucester)	(substituted on) Leon Fukofuka (from Auckland)	Mitchell Drummond; Andy Ellis; Leon Fukofuka (wider training group)
FH	Dan Carter; Colin Slade; Tom Taylor	(substituted off) Dan Carter (to (France) Racing 92); (substituted off) Colin Slade (to (France) Pau); (substituted off) Tom Taylor (to (France) Toulon)	(substituted on) Marty McKenzie (from Chiefs); (substituted on) Richie Mo'unga (from wider training group); (substituted on) Ben Volavola (from (Australia) Waratahs)	Marty McKenzie; Richie Mo'unga; Ben Volavola
CE	Ryan Crotty; Kieron Fonotia; Robbie Fruean; David Havili (wider training group)		(substituted on) Jack Goodhue (from Canterbury); (substituted on) Sean Wainui (from Taranaki)	Ryan Crotty; Kieron Fonotia; Robbie Fruean (did not play); Jack Goodhue (wider training group, did not play); David Havili; Sean Wainui
WG	Nathaniel Apa (wider training group); Jone Macilai-Tori; Johnny McNicholl; Nemani Nadolo; Nafi Tuitavake	(substituted off) Nathaniel Apa (to Canterbury); (substituted off) Nafi Tuitavake (to North Harbour)	(substituted on) Sione Fifita (from Counties Manukau)	Sione Fifita (did not play); Jone Macilai-Tori; Johnny McNicholl; Nemani Nadolo
FB	Israel Dagg		(substituted on) Mitchell Hunt (from Auckland)	Israel Dagg (wider training group); Mitchell Hunt
Coach	Todd Blackadder			Todd Blackadder

== Highlanders ==
Highlanders transfers 2015–16
Pos	2015 squad	Out	In	2016 squad
PR	Brendon Edmonds; Ma'afu Fia; Ross Geldenhuys; Kane Hames; Josh Hohneck; Daniel Lienert-Brown (short-term); Pingi Tala'apitaga	(substituted off) Ma'afu Fia (to (Wales) Ospreys); (substituted off) Kane Hames (to Tasman); (substituted off) Pingi Tala'apitaga (to Bay of Plenty)	(substituted on) Siua Halanukonuka (from Tasman); (substituted on) Craig Millar (from Otago); (substituted on) Aki Seiuli (from Otago)	Brendon Edmonds; Ross Geldenhuys; Siua Halanukonuka; Josh Hohneck; Daniel Lienert-Brown; Craig Millar (wider training group); Aki Seiuli (short-term)
HK	Liam Coltman; Ash Dixon		(substituted on) Greg Pleasants-Tate (from Auckland)	Liam Coltman; Ash Dixon; Greg Pleasants-Tate (wider training group)
LK	Alex Ainley; Tom Franklin; Jackson Hemopo (short-term); Joe Latta (wider training group); Mark Reddish; Joe Wheeler	(substituted off) Joe Latta (to (England) Gloucester)		Alex Ainley; Tom Franklin; Jackson Hemopo (wider training group, did not play); Mark Reddish; Joe Wheeler
FL	Shane Christie; Gareth Evans; John Hardie; James Lentjes (short-term); Dan Pryor	(substituted off) John Hardie (to (Scotland) Edinburgh)	(substituted on) Luke Whitelock (from Crusaders)	Shane Christie; Gareth Evans; James Lentjes; Dan Pryor; Luke Whitelock
N8	Elliot Dixon; Nasi Manu	(substituted off) Nasi Manu (to (Scotland) Edinburgh)	(substituted on) Liam Squire (from Chiefs)	Elliot Dixon; Liam Squire
SH	Scott Eade (short-term); Josh Renton (wider training group); Aaron Smith; Fumiaki Tanaka	(substituted off) Scott Eade (to Southland)	(substituted on) Jamie Booth (from Manawatu); (substituted on) Te Aihe Toma (from Bay of Plenty)	Jamie Booth (short-term); Josh Renton; Aaron Smith; Fumiaki Tanaka (wider training group); Te Aihe Toma (short-term)
FH	Marty Banks; Hayden Parker; Lima Sopoaga		(substituted on) Fletcher Smith (from Otago)	Marty Banks; Hayden Parker; Fletcher Smith (short-term); Lima Sopoaga
CE	Jason Emery; Malakai Fekitoa; Shaun Treeby	(substituted off) Shaun Treeby (to Wellington)	(substituted on) Matt Faddes (from Otago); (substituted on) Rob Thompson (from Canterbury); (substituted on) Sio Tomkinson (from Otago); (substituted on) Teihorangi Walden (from Otago)	Jason Emery; Matt Faddes; Malakai Fekitoa; Rob Thompson; Sio Tomkinson (wider training group, did not play); Teihorangi Walden (wider training group)
WG	Richard Buckman; Waisake Naholo; Patrick Osborne; Trent Renata; Ryan Tongia (wider training group)	(substituted off) Trent Renata (to Tasman)	(substituted on) Jack Wilson (from Otago)	Richard Buckman (did not play); Waisake Naholo; Patrick Osborne; Ryan Tongia; Jack Wilson (wider training group)
FB	Kurt Baker; Ben Smith	(substituted off) Kurt Baker (to Taranaki)		Ben Smith
Coach	Jamie Joseph			Jamie Joseph

== Hurricanes ==
Hurricanes transfers 2015–16
Pos	2015 squad	Out	In	2016 squad
PR	Chris Eves; Tolu Fahamokioa (short-term); Ben Franks; Reggie Goodes; Ben May; John Schwalger (did not play); Jeffery Toomaga-Allen	(substituted off) Tolu Fahamokioa (to Hawke's Bay); (substituted off) Ben Franks (to (England) London Irish); (substituted off) John Schwalger (to Wellington)	(substituted on) Mike Kainga (from Bay of Plenty); (substituted on) Hisa Sasagi (from Otago); (substituted on) Loni Uhila (from Waikato)	Chris Eves; Reggie Goodes; Mike Kainga (short-term); Ben May; Hisa Sasagi (wider training group, did not play); Jeffery Toomaga-Allen; Loni Uhila
HK	Dane Coles; Motu Matu'u; Brayden Mitchell (short-term)	(substituted off) Brayden Mitchell (to Southland)	(substituted on) Leni Apisai (from Wellington); (substituted on) Ricky Riccitelli (from Hawke's Bay)	Leni Apisai (wider training group); Dane Coles; Motu Matu'u; Ricky Riccitelli (short-term)
LK	Mark Abbott; James Broadhurst; Geoffrey Cridge (did not play); Vaea Fifita (short-term); Christian Lloyd (did not play); Jeremy Thrush	(substituted off) Jeremy Thrush (to (England) Gloucester)	(substituted on) James Blackwell (from Wellington); (substituted on) Michael Fatialofa (from Auckland)	Mark Abbott; James Blackwell (wider training group, did not play); James Broadhurst (did not play); Geoffrey Cridge; Michael Fatialofa (wider training group); Vaea Fifita; Christian Lloyd (did not play)
FL	Callum Gibbins; Adam Hill (wider training group); Iopu Iopu-Aso (did not play); Ardie Savea; Brad Shields	(substituted off) Adam Hill (to Wellington)	(substituted on) Tony Lamborn (from Hawke's Bay); (substituted on) Hugh Renton (from wider training group)	Callum Gibbins; Iopu Iopu-Aso (did not play); Tony Lamborn (wider training group); Hugh Renton (did not play); Ardie Savea; Brad Shields
N8	Blade Thomson; Victor Vito			Blade Thomson; Victor Vito
SH	TJ Perenara; Chris Smylie; Frae Wilson (wider training group)	(substituted off) Chris Smylie (to (Italy) Benetton Treviso); (substituted off) Frae Wilson (to Wellington)	(substituted on) Jamison Gibson-Park (from Blues); (substituted on) Te Toiroa Tahuriorangi (from Taranaki)	Jamison Gibson-Park (wider training group); TJ Perenara; Te Toiroa Tahuriorangi
FH	Beauden Barrett; Otere Black (wider training group); James Marshall		(substituted on) TJ Va'a (from Wellington)	Beauden Barrett; Otere Black; James Marshall; TJ Va'a (wider training group, did not play)
CE	Vince Aso (did not play); Willis Halaholo; Rey Lee-Lo; Ma'a Nonu; Conrad Smith	(substituted off) Rey Lee-Lo (to (Wales) Cardiff Blues); (substituted off) Ma'a Nonu (to (France) Toulon); (substituted off) Conrad Smith (to (France) Pau)	(substituted on) Pita Ahki (from Blues); (substituted on) Ngani Laumape (from New Zealand Warriors)	Pita Ahki (did not play); Vince Aso; Willis Halaholo (wider training group); Ngani Laumape
WG	Cory Jane; Matt Proctor; Julian Savea		(substituted on) Wes Goosen (from Wellington)	Wes Goosen (short-term); Cory Jane; Matt Proctor; Julian Savea
FB	Sam McNicol (wider training group); Nehe Milner-Skudder; Jason Woodward	(substituted off) Sam McNicol (to Chiefs)		Nehe Milner-Skudder; Jason Woodward
Coach	Chris Boyd			Chris Boyd

== See also ==
- List of 2015–16 Premiership Rugby transfers
- List of 2015–16 Pro12 transfers
- List of 2015–16 Top 14 transfers
- List of 2015–16 RFU Championship transfers
- List of 2015 SuperLiga transfers
- SANZAAR
- Super Rugby franchise areas
