= Aki Seiuli =

NZ rugby union player (born 1992)

- Born: 22 December 1992 (age 33) Christchurch, New Zealand
- Height: 1.84 m (6 ft 0 in)
- Weight: 118 kg (18 st 8 lb; 260 lb)
- School: Timaru Boys' High School

Rugby union career
- Position: Prop
Senior career
Years	Team	Apps	(Points)
2012–	Otago	48	(20)
2014, 2016−19	Highlanders	21	(20)
2019–21	Glasgow Warriors	29	(10)
2021–25	Dragons	56	(25)
2025–	Utah Warriors	17	(5)
- Correct as of 18th Jul 2025
International career
Years	Team	Apps	(Points)
2022–	Samoa	8	(0)
- Correct as of 18th Jul 2025

Aki Seiuli (born 22 December 1992) is a New Zealand born rugby union player of Samoan heritage who currently plays as a prop for Utah Warriors and the Samoan national side. He previously played for Dragons; Glasgow Warriors; and the New Zealand sides Otago - in domestic Mitre 10 Cup - and the Highlanders - in the international Super Rugby competition.

== Rugby Union career ==
=== Amateur career ===
Born in Christchurch on New Zealand's South Island, Seiuli moved to the town of Timaru, which lies roughly halfway between Christchurch and Dunedin, in 2002 and attended Timaru Boys' High School there. He captained the school's first XV rugby side in his final year before going on to play once for South Canterbury in the Heartland Championship while he was still a college student. He later moved to Otago and turned out for the Taieri Eels with whom he won the Dunedin Premier Club Championship in 2012.

=== Professional career ===
Success in local club rugby saw Seiuli earn a spot in the Otago squad for the 2012 ITM Cup. After debuting in a match against local rivals Southland in week 3 of the competition, he went on to play 7 times throughout the year as the Razorbacks reached the Championship final before being thrashed 41-16 by Counties Manukau. He once again featured 7 times in 2013, with every appearance from the replacements bench before becoming much more of a regular in 2014. Injury to fellow loosehead Craig Millar meant that he started all 10 of Otago's games in what proved to be a difficult year which ended up with them finishing in 6th place on the championship log and missing out on the playoffs completely.

2015 brought about an upturn in Otago's form with a 3rd place log finish and an appearance in the Championship semi-finals before being downed 34-14 by Wellington, however Millar's return from injury meant that Seiuli found himself once again playing largely from the replacements bench, making just 2 starts from 10 appearances. It was a pattern which continued through 2016 Seiuli starting 3 games in the number 1 jersey to Millar's 9 as the men from Dunedin topped the Championship log before surprisingly losing out at home to North Harbour in the final which consigned them to another season of championship rugby in 2017.

Seiuli was not named in any of the five New Zealand Super Rugby franchise's squads ahead of the 2014 Super Rugby season, however an injury crisis in the Highlanders front row saw him called into their set-up to provide short-term cover. He made the bench for the Highlanders clash with the Hurricanes on 16 May 2014, but remained an unused replacement and in the end didn't make any appearances during the year.

Seiuli once again found himself in the Super Rugby wilderness in 2015 before injuries once again provided him with an opportunity in 2016. A season-ending injury suffered by Brendon Edmonds in April 2016 saw Seiuli brought in as back up to Daniel Lienert-Brown and Craig Millar. He finally made his Super Rugby debut in an impressive 26-13 victory over the Chiefs in Hamilton on 7 May 2016 and went on to play 7 times in total during the year as his side reached the tournament semi-finals before going down to the Lions in Johannesburg.

Tony Brown replaced the Japan bound Jamie Joseph as Highlanders head-coach ahead of the 2017 Super Rugby season and having worked with Seiuli before at provincial level, he saw fit to promote him to the franchise's senior squad ahead of his first campaign in charge.

On 11 September 2019, Seiuli moved to Scotland to sign for Glasgow Warriors in the Pro14 competition from the 2019-20 season. Seiuli stated: "Glasgow play a great brand of rugby, and that really drew me here. I’m really looking forward to getting out in front of the crowd here at Scotstoun. Hearing them at the Sale Sharks game was awesome – they’re on another level, and the atmosphere was incredible." He made his competitive debut for the Warriors on 30 November 2019, becoming Glasgow Warrior No. 308. Of the Glasgow move he told the Warrior Nation in a Q & A: "I’m loving it. The team is a great bunch of guys and the fans have been so welcoming since I came to Glasgow." He was nominated for the Glasgow Warriors Player of the Season award in 2019-20.

On 20 July 2021 he signed with Dragons.

Seiuli left the Dragons to join Major League Rugby side Utah Warriors ahead of their 2025 season.

==== Super Rugby Statistics ====
As of 9 January 2017

Season	Team	Games	Starts	Sub	Mins	Tries	Cons	Pens	Drops	Points	Yel	Red
2014	Highlanders	0	0	0	0	0	0	0	0	0	0	0
2016	Highlanders	7	0	7	146	1	0	0	0	5	0	0
Total		7	0	7	146	1	0	0	0	5	0	0

=== International career ===
On 29 May 2021 Seiuli was named in the Samoa international squad - alongside his then team-mate at Glasgow Warriors, TJ Ioane - to play the Maori All Blacks and Tonga in the summer of 2021. Both Seiuli's parents are Samoan, and his father was reportedly very keen for his son to represent Samoa.
