= Conrad Hoffmann =

South African rugby union player

Conrad Hoffman
- Full name: Conrad Fritz Hoffmann
- Born: 9 November 1987 (age 39) Worcester, Western Cape, South Africa
- Height: 1.81 m (5 ft 11 1/2 in)
- Weight: 86 kg (13 st 8 lb; 190 lb)
- School: Paarl Boys' High School

Rugby union career
- Position: Scrum-half
Youth career
- 2005–2007: Western Province
Amateur team(s)
Years	Team	Apps	(Points)
2010	Maties	4	(75)
2013	Hamiltons		
Senior career
Years	Team	Apps	(Points)
2007–2010	Western Province	44	(67)
2008	Stormers	1	(0)
2011	Sharks	11	(0)
2011–2012	Sharks (Currie Cup)	15	(10)
2014	Brumbies	4	(0)
2014–2015	Sharks (Currie Cup)	8	(0)
2015	Sharks	12	(0)
- Correct as of 14 June 2015
International career
Years	Team	Apps	(Points)
2006	South Africa Under-19		
- Correct as of 21 October 2013

Conrad Fritz Hoffmann (born 9 November 1987 in Worcester, Western Cape) is a South African rugby union player, who most recently played with the Sharks. His regular position is scrum-half.

== Career ==
=== Youth ===
In 2005, he represented Western Province at the Under-18 Craven Week competition. He progressed through their age groups, representing them at Under-19 level in 2006 and at Under-21 level in 2007.

He was also included in the South Africa Under-19 squad for the 2006 Under 19 Rugby World Championship.

=== Western Province / Stormers ===
He was included in Western Province's squad for the 2007 Vodacom Cup and made his first class debut in the opening match of the season, a 51–21 victory over the Border Bulldogs in Cape Town. He made a total of five appearances during that competition, making his first start in the match against SWD Eagles, also scoring a try in that match.

He got his first taste of Currie Cup action a few months later, coming on as a substitute in their 2007 Currie Cup Premier Division match against the Golden Lions. He made three starts and three substitute appearances during that competition.

In 2008, he made yet another step up by being included in the Stormers squad for the 2008 Super 14 season. He was an unused substitute in their match against the Blues, but did make his Super Rugby appearance as a late substitute in their next match against the Force in Perth. However, he missed the rest of the season due to injury.

He returned to action during the 2009 Vodacom Cup, making six appearances in that competition. In June 2009, he scored a hat-trick of tries in Western Province's 2009 Currie Cup compulsory friendly match against the Mighty Elephants and a week later was named as a substitute for their match against the British & Irish Lions during their 2009 tour to South Africa, but failed to make an appearance.

He made four more appearances during the 2009 Currie Cup Premier Division, as well as 21 appearances during the 2010 Vodacom Cup and Currie Cup competitions.

He also made four appearances for university side Maties during the 2010 Varsity Cup tournament, ending second in the points scoring charts with 75 points.

=== Sharks ===
He made the move to Durban to join the Sharks on a two-year deal for the 2011 season. He made 11 appearances for them during the 2011 Super Rugby season and a further 11 appearances domestically for the Sharks XV in the 2011 Vodacom Cup and the Sharks in the 2011 Currie Cup Premier Division.

However, he dropped out of the Super Rugby squad in 2012, making just four substitute appearances during the 2012 Vodacom Cup competition and was an unused substitute once during the 2012 Currie Cup Premier Division.

=== Hamiltons ===
He returned to Cape Town to play for club side Hamiltons. He helped the team finish runners-up in the 2013 Western Province Super League A, which assured their qualification to the 2014 SARU Community Cup. He was named in Western Province's wider training group prior to the 2013 Currie Cup Premier Division season, but failed to make an appearance for them. A proposed spell at Boland Cavaliers also failed to materialise.

=== Brumbies ===
Along with fellow South African Lionel Cronjé, he then joined Canberra-based side Brumbies on a two-year deal prior to the 2014 Super Rugby season. However, his stay in Canberra only lasted one season and he left after the 2014 season, having made just 4 appearances.

=== Return to Sharks ===
He returned to South Africa, rejoining the Sharks prior to the 2014 Currie Cup Premier Division.
