= William Lloyd (rugby union) =

New Zealand Rugby Union Player

- Full name: William Lloyd
- Born: 14 May 1990 (age 36) Auckland, New Zealand
- Height: 2.03 m (6 ft 8 in)
- Weight: 113 kg (17 st 11 lb; 249 lb)
- School: Orewa College

Rugby union career
- Position: Lock
- Current team: London Irish
Youth career
- Auckland Marist Old Boys Silverdale RFC
Senior career
| Years | Team | Apps | (Points) |
| 2014– | Auckland | 14 | (0) |
| 2015 | Blues | 3 | (0) |
| 2015– | London Irish | 42 | (5) |
- Correct as of 10 April 2017

William Lloyd (born 14 May 1990) is a New Zealand rugby union player who currently plays as a lock for London Irish in the Aviva Premiership.

== Career ==
Lloyd played his junior rugby in the North Harbour region but moved over the bridge to Auckland in 2012 and played his club rugby with Auckland Marist. He was called up by the Blues ahead of the 2014 Super Rugby season to train as an apprentice in the absence of the injured Culum Retallick, however he was unable to win a full-time contract. He was subsequently part of the Auckland side for the 2014 ITM Cup and made 7 appearances which duly convinced the Blues to include him in their wider training group for 2015.

Lloyd signed for London Irish for the remainder of the 2015/2016 Aviva Premiership season in early December. Lloyd said in a statement "Moving to London Irish presents me with a great opportunity to continue to play in one of the toughest leagues in the world. The facilities at Hazelwood are first class and there is a real ambition to push on in the competition. I’m delighted to be here and I’m looking forward to getting started.".

On 1 March 2016 it was announced that Lloyd had signed a two-year contract extension which would see him remain at London Irish until the end of the 2017–18 season.
