= Tolu Fahamokioa =

Tongan rugby union player

- Born: 5 May 1991 (age 35) Haveluloto, Tonga
- Height: 1.90 m (6 ft 3 in)
- Weight: 105 kg (16 st 7 lb; 231 lb)
- School: Wellington College

Rugby union career
- Position: Loosehead Prop
- Current team: Waikato
Senior career
Years	Team	Apps	(Points)
2013−14	Wellington	11	(10)
2015	Hurricanes	1	(0)
2015−2016	Hawke's Bay	21	(0)
2017−2018	Wellington	23	(20)
2019	New England Free Jacks	3	(0)
2020−2023	Waikato	4	(0)
2022	Wairarapa Bush	7	(0)
- Correct as of 24 November 2024
International career
Years	Team	Apps	(Points)
2018−2019	Tonga	1	(0)
- Correct as of 24 November 2024

Tolu Fahamokioa (born 5 May 1991) is a retired Tongan rugby union player, who most recently played as a prop for Waikato in New Zealand's National Provincial Championship. During the 2015 Super Rugby season he also made an appearance for the Hurricanes.

Fahamokioa first moved to New Zealand from Tonga in 1999.
