= Nathaniel Apa =

- Born: 15 June 1995 (age 31) Apia, Samoa
- Height: 1.87 m (6 ft 2 in)
- Weight: 105 kg (16 st 7 lb; 231 lb)
- School: Kelston Boys' High School

Rugby union career
- Position: Midfield Back / Wing
- Current team: Waikato
Senior career
Years	Team	Apps	(Points)
2014−15	Canterbury	7	(10)
2015	Crusaders	2	(0)
2016−	Waikato	5	(5)
- Correct as of 16 October 2016
International career
Years	Team	Apps	(Points)
2013	New Zealand Schools		
2014	Samoa U20		
2015	New Zealand U20		
- Correct as of 1 October 2015

Nathaniel Apa (born 15 June 1995) is a New Zealand rugby union player who currently plays as a midfield back for Waikato in the Mitre 10 Cup. He has also played for Canterbury.

During the 2015 Super Rugby season he made 2 appearances as a member of the Crusaders wider training squad.

Apa represented Samoa in the 2014 IRB Junior World Championship and New Zealand in the 2015 edition.
