= Mark Reddish =

- Born: 3 March 1985 (age 41) Wellington, New Zealand
- Height: 196 cm (6 ft 5 in)
- Weight: 117 kg (18 st 6 lb)
- School: Rongotai College
- Occupation: Builder

Rugby union career
- Position: Lock
Senior career
Years	Team	Apps	(Points)
2016−17	Harlequins	5	(5)
Provincial / State sides
Years	Team	Apps	(Points)
2009–16	Wellington	59	(20)
- Correct as of 17 March 2018
Super Rugby
Years	Team	Apps	(Points)
2011–14	Hurricanes	30	(0)
2015–16	Highlanders	23	(5)
- Correct as of 31 July 2016

Mark Reddish (born 3 March 1985) is a former New Zealand rugby union player who played as a lock for Wellington in the Mitre 10 Cup and the Highlanders in Super Rugby. Reddish moved to England to play for Harlequins in 2016 and retired from playing a year later due to medical advice.
