= Jarrod Firth =

- Born: 3 December 1991 (age 34) Auckland, New Zealand
- Height: 1.81 m (5 ft 11 in)
- Weight: 120 kg (18 st 13 lb)
- School: Saint Kentigern College

Rugby union career
- Position: Tighthead Prop
Amateur team(s)
Years	Team	Apps	(Points)
- Ardmore Marist
2016	Stirling County		
2016	Currie		
Senior career
Years	Team	Apps	(Points)
2016-17	Glasgow Warriors	0	(0)
2017-	Grenoble	0	(0)
Provincial / State sides
Years	Team	Apps	(Points)
2013−2016	Counties Manukau	25	(0)
Super Rugby
Years	Team	Apps	(Points)
2015	Chiefs	2	(0)

Jarrod Firth (born 3 December 1991) is a New Zealand rugby union footballer who currently plays as a prop for Grenoble in the Top 14.

== Rugby Union career ==
=== Amateur career ===
Firth played for Ardmore Marist in New Zealand.

On moving to Scotland, Firth has played for Stirling County and then Currie.

=== Professional career ===
He formerly played for Counties Manukau in the ITM Cup.

He previously made two appearances for the Chiefs during the 2015 Super Rugby season while on an interim contract with the franchise.

On 3 February 2016 it was announced that Firth has signed for Glasgow Warriors on a 2 1/2-year deal, subject to the player receiving a visa.

He made his debut for the Warriors on 30 August 2016 against Canada A. It was his only appearance for the Warriors.

On 25 January 2017 it was announced that Firth had signed for French club Grenoble.
