= Adam Hill (rugby union) =

New Zealand rugby union player

- Born: Adam Hill; 19 October 1986 (age 40) Gore, New Zealand
- Height: 1.90 m (6 ft 3 in)
- Weight: 102 kg (16 st 1 lb)

Rugby union career
- Position: Loose forward
Provincial / State sides
Years	Team	Apps	(Points)
2011–12	Otago	14	(0)
2013–	Wellington	26	(0)
- Correct as of 23 October 2015
Super Rugby
Years	Team	Apps	(Points)
2014–	Hurricanes	8	(0)
- Correct as of 5 July 2015

Adam Hill (born 19 October 1986) is a New Zealand rugby union player who currently plays as a loose forward for Wellington in the ITM Cup and the Hurricanes in Super Rugby.

== Career ==
A South Island native, Hill started out his senior career for the Dunedin based Otago Razorbacks and made 14 appearances for them over the course of 2 years. He shifted north to join the Wellington Lions for the 2013 ITM Cup and a successful first season in New Zealand's capital saw him named in the Hurricanes squad for the 2014 Super Rugby season.

Several injuries to other Hurricanes loose forwards led to Hill being named in the first-team squad for the two-match tour of South Africa which kicked off the 'Canes campaign. Hill's Super Rugby career got off to the worst-possible start as he was yellow-carded one minute after coming on to the field as a replacement. Given his sin-binning came with only 8 minutes remaining he didn't make it back onto the field before the final whistle and his side went down to a disappointing 27–9 defeat to the Sharks.
