= Christian Lloyd =

English rugby union player

Kristian Lloyd
- Born: 24 January 1992 (age 34) Poole, Dorset, England
- Height: 1.98 m (6 ft 6 in)
- Weight: 113 kg (249 lb)
- School: St. Patrick's College, Silverstream
- University: Victoria University of Wellington

Rugby union career
- Position: Lock
Provincial / State sides
Years	Team	Apps	(Points)
2014–	Wellington	4	(5)
- Correct as of 22 October 2016
Super Rugby
Years	Team	Apps	(Points)
2015–16	Hurricanes	0	(0)
International career
Years	Team	Apps	(Points)
2012	New Zealand under-20	2	(0)

Kristian Lloyd (born 24 January 1992) is a New Zealand rugby union player who currently plays as a lock for Wellington in the ITM Cup and the Hurricanes in Super Rugby.

== Career ==
The early part of Lloyd's career was plagued with injury problems, forcing him to take a 2-year sabbatical from the game to fully recover. He returned to play 4 games for the Wellington Lions during their ill-fated 2014 ITM Cup campaign which ended in relegation to the Championship Division. Despite this, Lloyd was identified as a player of huge potential by the Hurricanes and was named in their squad for the 2015 Super Rugby season.

== International career ==
Lloyd was a member of the New Zealand Under-20 team that competed in the 2012 IRB Junior World Championship in South Africa.
