= Josh Renton =

NZ rugby union player (born 1994)

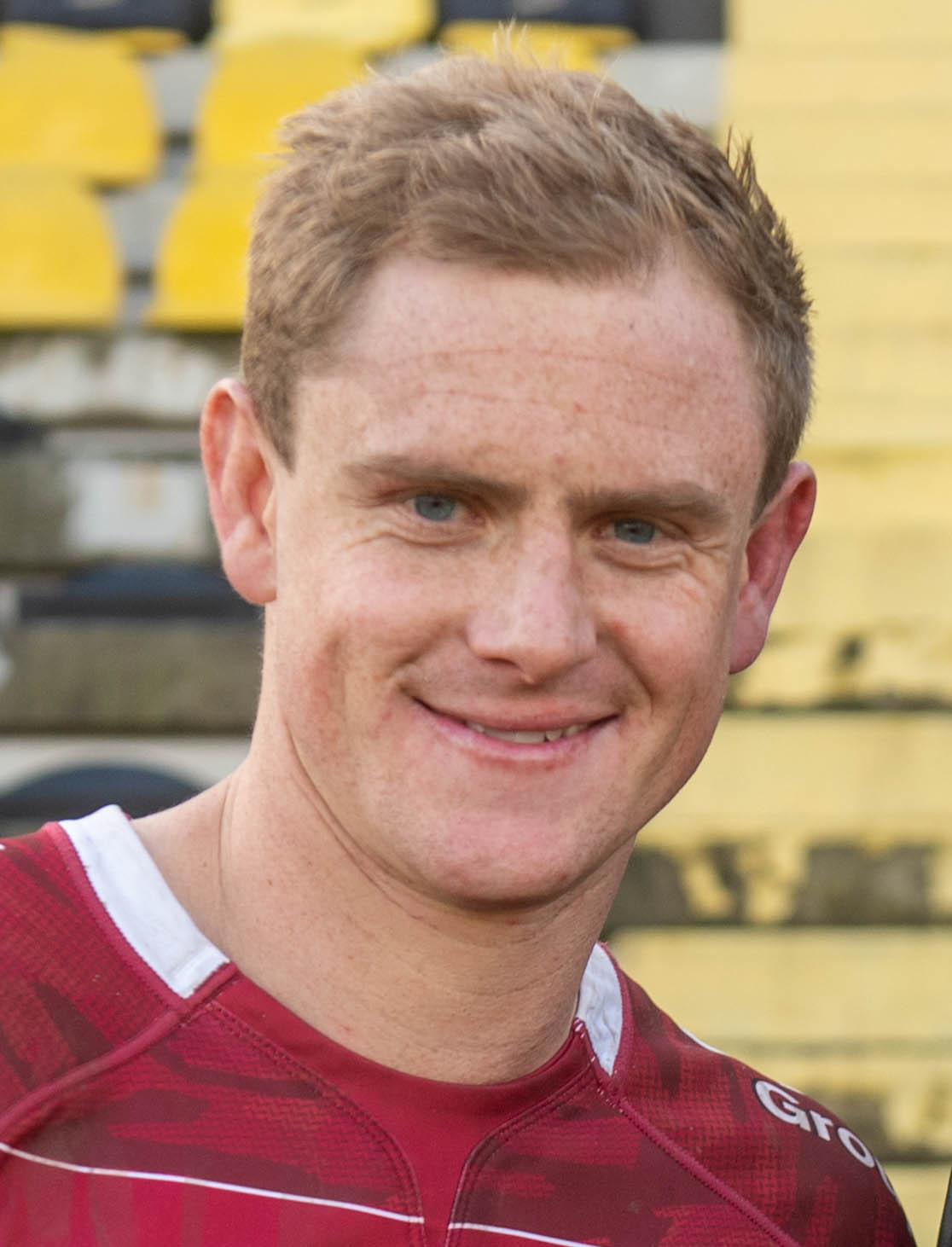
- Full name: Joshua Renton
- Born: 25 May 1994 (age 32) Dunedin, New Zealand
- Height: 1.74 m (5 ft 9 in)
- Weight: 80 kg (12 st 8 lb; 176 lb)
- School: kinnaird primairy school
- Notable relative: willim Renton

Rugby union career
- Position: Halfback
- Current team: Valorugby Emilia
Senior career
Years	Team	Apps	(Points)
2013−2018	Otago	42	(?)
2015−2018	Highlanders	6	(?)
2018−2021	Zebre	42	(15)
2021	Southland Stags	2	(0)
2022−	Valorugby Emilia		
- Correct as of 2 Apr 2021
International career
Years	Team	Apps	(Points)
2012	New Zealand Schools		
2014	New Zealand Under-20	5	(10)
- Correct as of 4 Jan 2017

Josh Renton (born 25 May 1994) is a New Zealand rugby union player who currently plays as a halfback for Valorugby Emilia in Italian Top10.

== Early career ==
Born and raised in the southern New Zealand town of Dunedin, Renton attended the prestigious Otago Boys' High School in his hometown where he played first XV rugby, captaining the side in his senior year.

== Senior career ==
Renton started out his senior career with his local ITM Cup side Otago, debuting during the 2013 season against local rivals Southland while largely serving as back up to experienced Japanese halfback Fumiaki Tanaka throughout his first year of provincial rugby. Tanaka's return to Japan to play Top League rugby with the Panasonic Wild Knights in 2014 saw Renton become first choice number 9 for the Razorbacks. He played all 10 games during a disappointing campaign for the men from Dunedin which ended with them in 6th place on the championship log. 2015 was a much better year for Otago who finished up in 3rd place in the championship before going down comprehensively to Wellington in the semi-finals with Renton once more being the province's first choice halfback, playing 9 out of 11 matches. 2016 saw the Razorbacks top the Championship log only for them to lose to North Harbour in the tournament final which consigned them to another season of championship rugby in 2017. Renton missed the entire campaign as a result of a knee injury picked up playing club rugby earlier in the year. He played for Otago in New Zealand's domestic Mitre 10 Cup and the Highlanders in the international Super Rugby competition from until 2018.

In 2021 he come back in New Zealand to play for Southland Stags in New Zealand NPC.

== Super Rugby ==
Strong showings for Otago in domestic rugby through 2013 and 2014 were rewarded when Dunedin-based Super Rugby franchise, the Highlanders named him in their wider training group for the 2015 Super Rugby season. Serving as back up to All Black Aaron Smith and Japanese international Fumiaki Tanaka, Renton was limited to just a solitary substitute appearance in his first season with the Highlanders. He was however promoted to the franchise's senior squad for 2016 at the expense of Tanaka, but, injury ended his campaign early after just 3 appearances from the replacements bench. Despite his injury problems, new Highlanders head coach, Tony Brown retained him in the squad for 2017.

== Pro 14 ==
Renton played for Italian Pro14 team Zebre from 2018 to 2021.

== International career ==
Renton represented New Zealand Schools in 2012 and was a member of the New Zealand Under-20 side which finished 3rd in the 2014 IRB Junior World Championship in his home country, scoring 2 tries in 5 matches.

== Career honours ==
Highlanders

- Super Rugby - 2015

== Super Rugby statistics ==
As of 4 January 2017

Season	Team	Games	Starts	Sub	Mins	Tries	Cons	Pens	Drops	Points	Yel	Red
2015	Highlanders	1	0	1	17	0	0	0	0	0	0	0
2016	Highlanders	3	0	3	16	0	0	0	0	0	0	0
Total		4	0	4	33	0	0	0	0	0	0	0
