= Matt Symons =

English rugby union player

- Born: Matt Symons; 4 August 1989 (age 37) Harlow, England
- Height: 2.00 m (6 ft 7 in)
- Weight: 121 kg (19 st 1 lb)
- University: University of Reading
- Notable relative: Andy Symons (brother)

Rugby union career
- Position: Lock
Youth career
- 1994–2006: Saracens
Senior career
Years	Team	Apps	(Points)
2011–2012	Esher	14	(5)
2013–2015	Canterbury	15	(5)
2014–2015	Chiefs	28	(5)
2015–2016	London Irish	23	(0)
2016–2018	Wasps	31	(5)
2018–2022	Harlequins	89	(0)
2011–2022	Total	200	(20)
- Correct as of 30 June 2022

Matt Symons (born 4 August 1989) is an English retired rugby union player who played 200 career games in a career spanning 11 seasons. He played for Esher in the RFU Championship before playing for currently plays for Canterbury and Chiefs in New Zealand; returning to England he played for London Irish, Wasps and Harlequins in Premiership Rugby. He won the Premiership with Harlequins in 2021.

== Career ==
Symons has had an interesting route to the top. He started out in the Saracens youth system before leaving to pursue a career in rowing. An injury to his forearm ended his rowing career and saw him make a return to rugby. In 2011, he started playing professionally for Esher for whom he made 14 appearances.

2012 saw him head south to New Zealand where he set up base in Christchurch and initially saw action for the Canterbury B side and Crusaders Knights development team before being named in the Canterbury squad for the 2013 ITM Cup. He became a regular starter in his first full season and earned himself a Super Rugby contract with two-time champions the Chiefs for the 2014 Super Rugby season.

On 25 March 2015, Symons returned to his home nation to sign for London Irish in the Aviva Premiership from the 2015-16 season following Chiefs assistant coach Tom Coventry to the English side.

On 28 June it was confirmed that Symons had terminated his contract with London Irish after their relegation to the Greene King IPA Championship and signed for former London rival Wasps.

On 23 May 2018, Symons would sign for Premiership rivals Harlequins from the 2018-19 season.

He started in the Premiership final against Exeter on 26 June 2021 as Harlequins won the game 40-38 in the highest scoring Premiership final ever.
