= Joe Edwards (rugby union) =

- Born: 21 September 1993 (age 33) Auckland, New Zealand
- Height: 1.95 m (6 ft 5 in)
- Weight: 111 kg (17 st 7 lb)
- School: Edgewater College; Saint Kentigern College

Rugby union career
- Position(s): Flanker, Number 8
Senior career
| Years | Team | Apps | (Points) |
| 2016−2017 | Bordeaux | 7 | (0) |
| 2017–2020 | Provence | 52 | (25) |
| 2020− | Vannes | | |
- Correct as of 7 April 2020
Provincial / State sides
| Years | Team | Apps | (Points) |
| 2012–2016 | Auckland | 41 | (15) |
- Correct as of 16 October 2016
Super Rugby
| Years | Team | Apps | (Points) |
| 2015−2016 | Blues | 8 | (0) |
- Correct as of 20 July 2016
International career
| Years | Team | Apps | (Points) |
| 2013 | New Zealand under-20 | 4 | (10) |
| 2015–2016 | Māori All Blacks | 1 | (0) |
- Correct as of 18 July 2015

Joe Edwards (born 21 September 1993) is a rugby union footballer who plays as a loose forward for the RC Vannes in France's Rugby Top 14. He made his provincial debut during the 2012 season against Manawatu and to date has made 9 appearances and scored 1 try. Joe previously went to Edgewater College (2007–09) and Saint Kentigern College (2010–11) and was in the First XV at both schools.

He is the Great nephew of Sam Edwards former NZ Kiwi rugby league player.

His impressive performances at NPC level have seen him named in the Blues Wider Training Squad for the 2013 Super Rugby season. He was subsequently upgraded to a first-team contract for 2015.
