= Maʻafu Fia =

Tonga international rugby union player

Ma'afu Fia
- Born: Ma'afu Fia; 22 November 1989 (age 36) Tofoa, Tonga
- Height: 1.78 m (5 ft 10 in)
- Weight: 124 kg (19 st 7 lb)
- School: Palmerston North Boys' High School

Rugby union career
- Position: Tighthead Prop
Senior career
Years	Team	Apps	(Points)
2015–2022	Ospreys	102	(30)
2022	→ Bath Rugby	6	(0)
- Correct as of 31 May 2022
Provincial / State sides
Years	Team	Apps	(Points)
2009–15	Manawatu	61	(10)
Super Rugby
Years	Team	Apps	(Points)
2012–15	Highlanders	39	(0)
International career
Years	Team	Apps	(Points)
2018-	Tonga	11	(0)

Ma'afu Fia (born 22 November 1989) is a Tongan International rugby union prop who most recently played rugby for Ospreys in the URC, having previously represented the Highlanders in Super Rugby.

== Early life ==
Fia was born in Tonga and moved to New Zealand in 2001. He went to school with Aaron Cruden, Andre Taylor and Kurt Baker.

== Playing career ==
=== Provincial Rugby ===
Fia had a stellar year in 2009 as he broke into the Manawatu provincial squad for the Air New Zealand Cup competition and helped New Zealand to the IRB World Under-20 title. As a result, he was named Manawatu's Outstanding Junior Sportsperson for 2009.

In the 2010 ITM Cup, Fia established himself as a starter at prop for Manawatu, and scored his first provincial try. In the 2011 ITM Cup, he was a key part of a vastly improved Turbos squad.

=== Super Rugby ===
Fia signed with the Highlanders for the 2012 Super Rugby season. He spent 4 seasons with the Highlanders and was a member of their 2015 Super Rugby championship squad, although he was sidelined for most of the season through a knee injury.

=== Pro 14 ===
On 5 October 2015, Fia signed a 3-year contract with the Ospreys. On 17 September 2016, he scored his first Ospreys try against Treviso in round 3.

=== International ===
Fia was born in Tonga but moved to New Zealand in 2001 at the age of 11, and represented New Zealand at youth levels. He is a 2009 IRB Junior World Championship winner, with New Zealand.

He made his debut for the Tonga Rugby Union on 17 November 2018, against Wales. He was selected for his first Rugby World Cup in 2019.
