= Frae Wilson =

- Born: 9 February 1989 (age 37) Wellington, New Zealand
- Height: 1.75 m (5 ft 9 in)
- Weight: 90 kg (200 lb)
- School: Te Aute College

Rugby union career
- Position: Halfback
Provincial / State sides
Years	Team	Apps	(Points)
2011–	Wellington	43	(35)
- Correct as of 23 October 2015
Super Rugby
Years	Team	Apps	(Points)
2012, 15	Hurricanes	4	(0)
2013–14	Highlanders	1	(0)
- Correct as of 13 June 2015
International career
Years	Team	Apps	(Points)
2012–	Māori All Blacks	3	(10)
- Correct as of 23 November 2012

Frae Wilson (born 9 February 1989) is a rugby union footballer who plays as a halfback forWellington in the ITM Cup. He was part of theHurricanes wider training group for the 2012 Super Rugby season and made two appearances for the franchise.

Of Ngāti Rangi and Te Āti Awa descent, Wilson toured the United Kingdom with the Māori All Blacks in 2012.

He was named to theHighlanders Wider Training Squad for the 2013 and 2014 Super Rugby seasons.

In 2015 he returned to the Hurricanes as a member of the Wider Training Group.
