= Pingi Tala'apitaga =

Samoan rugby union player

- Full name: Pingi Tala'apitaga
- Born: 24 February 1987 (age 39) Apia, Samoa
- Height: 1.87 m (6 ft 2 in)
- Weight: 120 kg (18 st 13 lb; 265 lb)
- Notable relative: Patrick Faapale (Cousin)

Rugby union career
- Position: Tighthead Prop
Senior career
Years	Team	Apps	(Points)
2010 - 2016	Bay of Plenty	47	(5)
2014-2015	Highlanders	23	(0)
2016-2017	Narbonne	18	(10)
- Correct as of 21 October 2016

Pingi Tala'apitaga (born 24 February 1987) is a Samoan rugby union player who currently plays as a prop for Bay of Plenty in the ITM Cup and the Highlanders in Super Rugby.

== Career ==
Tala'apitaga debuted for the Bay of Plenty Steamers during the 2010 ITM Cup, however it wasn't until the 2013 season that he really began to establish himself as a regular member of the side. 2014 Tala'apitaga had a strong campaign personally, dominating at scrum time and physical in the loose, he was chased both by the Chiefs and the Highlanders before deciding to sign a Super Rugby contract with the Dunedin-based Highlanders for the 2015 season.
