= Sam McNicol =

NZ rugby union player (born 1995)

- Full name: Samuel James McNicol
- Born: 6 October 1995 (age 31) Feilding, New Zealand
- Height: 185 cm (6 ft 1 in)
- Weight: 94 kg (207 lb; 14 st 11 lb)
- School: Napier Boys' High School

Rugby union career
- Position(s): Wing, Centre
- Current team: Chiefs, Hawke's Bay
Senior career
Years	Team	Apps	(Points)
2015	Hurricanes	1	(0)
2015	Wellington	4	(0)
2016–2020	Chiefs	19	(15)
2017–2020	Hawke's Bay	8	(5)
- Correct as of 21 July 2022

Sam McNicol (born 6 October 1995) is a New Zealand rugby union player who played as an outside back for Wellington and Hawke's Bay in New Zealand's domestic Mitre 10 Cup and the Hurricanes and Chiefs in the international Super Rugby competition.

== Early career ==
Born in Feilding in New Zealand's Manawatū District, McNicol attended school further north in the town of Napier where he played first XV rugby for the local Napier Boys' High School.

== Senior career ==
Originally named in the Wellington Lions squad for the 2014 ITM Cup, the then 19-year old McNicol didn't get any game time due to having to undergo double hip surgery and had to wait until the following year to make his provincial debut. A fractured eye-socket limited him to just 4 appearances during what was to prove to be his final season in Wellington.

He moved back to Napier in 2016 to join newly promoted Mitre 10 Cup Premiership side, the Hawke's Bay Magpies. Unfortunately, injury struck again and he was forced to miss the entire season as his new club slipped to relegation back to the Championship for 2017.

== Super Rugby ==
Despite having no senior provincial rugby experience under his belt, McNicol was called into the Hurricanes wider training group during the 2015 Super Rugby season and made one appearance, against the Chiefs in New Plymouth. 2016 saw him earn his first full Super Rugby contract, this time with the Hamilton-based Chiefs. He scored 2 tries in 11 appearances in his first season with the Chiefs and despite injuries holding him back once more in domestic rugby, he was retained in the squad for 2017 and 2018.

== Super Rugby Statistics ==
As of 10 December 2016

Season	Team	Games	Starts	Sub	Mins	Tries	Cons	Pens	Drops	Points	Yel	Red
2015	Hurricanes	1	0	1	50	0	0	0	0	0	0	0
2016	Chiefs	11	6	5	514	2	0	0	0	10	0	0
Total		12	6	6	564	2	0	0	0	10	0	0

== International ==
McNicol was a New Zealand Schools representative in 2013.

== Post rugby playing career ==
In 2022 it was announced that McNicol would take up the role of rugby institute coach at St John's College, Hastings. He was also a Hawke's Bay Rugby Union secondary schools rugby development officer.
