= Brayden Mitchell =

- Born: Brayden Mitchell; 24 January 1989 (age 37) Invercargill, Southland, New Zealand
- Height: 1.83 m (6 ft 0 in)
- Weight: 103 kg (16 st 3 lb)
- School: King's High School; Southland Boys' High School

Rugby union career
- Position: Hooker
Senior career
Years	Team	Apps	(Points)
2009–13, 15-	Southland	44	(10)
2013–2014	Waikato	17	(15)
Super Rugby
Years	Team	Apps	(Points)
2011–14	Highlanders	12	(0)
2015	Hurricanes	11	(0)
2017	Chiefs	5	(0)

Brayden Mitchell (born 21 January 1989) is a New Zealand rugby union footballer. He plays as a hooker for Southland in the Mitre 10 Cup.

== Playing career ==
=== Provincial Rugby ===
Mitchell, a product of the Southland academy system, made his debut for the Stags during the 2009 Air New Zealand Cup, and served as backup to Jason Rutledge after David Hall suffered a season-ending knee injury. He continued to apprentice behind Rutledge in the 2010 ITM Cup.

Mitchell transferred to Waikato for the 2014 ITM Cup but moved back to Southland for 2016.

A serious neck injury forced Mitchell to miss the entire 2018 Mitre 10 Cup season.

=== Super Rugby ===
Mitchell was selected to the Highlanders squad for the 2011 Super Rugby season, where he served as the team's 3rd choice hooker behind Jason Rutledge and Mahonri Schwalger and made 4 substitute appearances. He continued as the Highlanders 3rd choice hooker through 2014 before transferring to the Hurricanes for 2015, where he was a squad regular making 11 substitute appearances.

For 2017, Mitchell signed with the Chiefs.

=== International Play ===
Mitchell was a member of the 2009 New Zealand Under 20's who won the IRB Junior World Championship, and scored a try in the final against England after a brilliant pass from Stags teammate Alex Ryan.
