= Sean Polwart =

- Born: 14 April 1990 (age 36) Pukekohe, New Zealand
- Height: 1.83 m (6 ft 0 in)
- Weight: 97 kg (15 st 4 lb)
- Occupation: Landscaper

Rugby union career
- Position: Flanker
Provincial / State sides
Years	Team	Apps	(Points)
2010–15	Auckland	47	(10)
- Correct as of 19 October 2014
Super Rugby
Years	Team	Apps	(Points)
2011–12	Blues	5	(0)
2015	Chiefs	1	(0)
- Correct as of 21 June 2015
International career
Years	Team	Apps	(Points)
2010	New Zealand U20	5	(10)
2014–15	Māori All Blacks	2	(5)
- Correct as of 11 November 2014

Sean Polwart (born 14 April 1990) is a former New Zealand rugby union player who played as a flanker for Auckland in the ITM Cup.

He made his Auckland debut in 2010, and was signed by the Blues for the 2011 and 2012 seasons, making five appearances. Additionally Polwart was a member of the Chiefs squad during the 2015 season, for whom he played in one match.

Internationally, Polwart won the 2010 IRB Junior World Championship with the New Zealand Under 20 team, scoring 2 tries in 5 games. He has also represented the Maori All Blacks.

In early 2017, Polwart announced his retirement from playing due to a serious concussion injury suffered in 2015 while training with the Chiefs.
