= Jackson Hemopo =

NZ rugby union player (born 1993)

- Full name: Jackson Nikora Hemopo
- Born: 14 November 1993 (age 33) Whanganui, New Zealand
- Height: 195 cm (6 ft 5 in)
- Weight: 112 kg (247 lb; 17 st 9 lb)
- School: Palmerston North Boys' High School

Rugby union career
- Position(s): Lock, Flanker, Number 8
- Current team: Secom Rugguts
Senior career
Years	Team	Apps	(Points)
2012–2015	Otago	18	(10)
2015–2019	Highlanders	39	(5)
2016–2019	Manawatu	22	(20)
2020–2026	Mitsubishi DynaBoars	69	(87)
2026–	Secom Rugguts		
- Correct as of 21 October 2022
International career
Years	Team	Apps	(Points)
2017–2018	Māori All Blacks	4	(15)
2018–2019	New Zealand	5	(0)
2018	World XV	1	(0)
- Correct as of 28 August 2019

Jackson Nikora Hemopo (born 14 November 1993) is a New Zealand rugby union player who played as a lock or loose forward for Manawatu in New Zealand's domestic Mitre 10 Cup and the Highlanders in the international Super Rugby competition.

He was called into New Zealand's international rugby team, the All Blacks, in 2018 and played three tests that year. Hemopo signed a one-year deal with Japan-based club Mitsubishi Sagamihara DynaBoars at the start of 2019, with the deal becoming effective from the end of the 2019 Rugby World Cup.

== Early career ==
Born in Whanganui in New Zealand's Manawatū-Whanganui region, Hemopo was educated at Palmerston North Boys' High School, in Palmerston North, the biggest town in his home region. Of Māori descent, Hemopo affiliates to the Tuhourangi, Ngāti Rangi, Ngāi Tahu, Ngāti Apa ki te Rā Tō, and Ngāti Wahiao iwi.

He played first XV rugby while at school and after graduating headed south to Dunedin where he began playing for the Green Island rugby club in Otago's Premier club rugby competition. He had one season with the Southern club before transferring back to Green Island and winning the Dunedin club player of the year award in 2016.

== Senior career ==
Hemopo first made the Otago squad ahead of the 2014 ITM Cup and went on to play all 10 of their games during what proved to be a difficult year, with an inexperienced side finishing 6th on the Championship log, comfortably outside the playoff places. The Razorbacks were in better form in 2015, ending up 3rd in the championship table before being comprehensively defeated by Wellington in the semi-finals. Hemopo managed just 6 appearances and 1 try in his second campaign of domestic rugby in Dunedin.

At the end of 2015, it was announced that Hemopo would be heading home to join Manawatu for the 2016 Mitre 10 Cup. The Turbos, in their first season back in the Championship following a disappointing 1-year stay in the Premiership, could only finish in 5th place which saw them miss out on the promotion playoffs, however, Hemopo himself was in good form, playing in all 10 of their regular season matches and scoring 1 try.

== Super Rugby ==
Although not initially named in the Highlanders squad for the 2015 Super Rugby season, injuries among the franchise's forward pack saw the versatile Hemopo called up to provide short-term cover midway through the year. He debuted in a 44–7 victory away to the Blues on 12 June 2015 and that was to prove to be his only appearance during what was the Highlanders maiden Super Rugby winning season.

However, he had done enough to earn a spot in the wider training group for the 2016 season where strong competition for places among the Highlanders forwards meant that he had to spend the season on the sidelines kicking his heels as the men from Dunedin reached the tournament semi-finals before being downed by the Lions in Johannesburg.

Despite not making any appearances through 2016, it was announced in October of that year that Hemopo had signed a new 3-year deal with the Highlanders that would see him remain a member of the wider training group in 2017 before becoming a full squad member for 2018 and 2019.

== International ==
He was selected in the squad for the 2013 IRB Junior World Championship in France, however he sustained an injury during a club rugby match one week before the team departed New Zealand, which ruled him out of the tournament. He was a member of the Māori All Blacks on their 2017 end-of-year tour to Canada and France.

During the 2018 three-test series against France, Hemopo was called into the New Zealand national rugby union team, the All Blacks, as injury cover alongside Highlanders teammate Tom Franklin. After proving himself as a promising player during training, Hemopo was named to make his All Black debut in the third and final test of the series, on 23 June 2018. Hemopo made a short cameo off the bench during the first half of the test while Highlanders teammate Shannon Frizell, who was also on debut, was in the blood bin. Hemopo was bought back onto the field in the 69th minute for All Blacks captain Sam Whitelock, with the All Blacks beating France 49–14.

Hemopo was re-selected for New Zealand, for 2018 Rugby Championship, being chosen over established utility forward, Vaea Fifita. Hemopo made one appearance off the bench in the competition, replacing Shannon Frizell in a win over Argentina.

On the 2018 end-of-year tour, Hemopo was named in the wider training group for the All Blacks' 51-man squad. He made his first start for New Zealand, at lock, on 3 November 2018, during a test against Japan. Hemopo was not replaced during the test.

After earning a spot in New Zealand's 39-man squad for the 2019 Rugby Championship, Hemopo made two appearances off the bench in the competition, one in a win against Argentina and another in a record 36–0 win against Australia. However, after outstanding performances by Ardie Savea and Patrick Tuipulotu, Hemopo missed out on the All Blacks' 31-man squad for the 2019 Rugby World Cup.

== Career honours ==
Highlanders

- Super Rugby - 2015

== Super Rugby statistics ==
As of 9 January 2017

Season	Team	Games	Starts	Sub	Mins	Tries	Cons	Pens	Drops	Points	Yel	Red
2015	Highlanders	1	0	1	23	0	0	0	0	0	0	0
2016	Highlanders	0	0	0	0	0	0	0	0	0	0	0
Total		1	0	1	23	0	0	0	0	0	0	0
