= Michael Fitzgerald (rugby union, born 1987) =

NZ rugby union player (born 1987)

- Born: Michael Fitzgerald; 8 February 1987 (age 39) Auckland, New Zealand
- Height: 1.97 m (6 ft 5 1/2 in)
- Weight: 116 kg (18 st 4 lb)
- School: Wanganui High School

Rugby union career
- Position: Lock
- Current team: Kamaishi Seawaves
Senior career
Years	Team	Apps	(Points)
2005–2009	Wanganui	23	(35)
2009–2015	Manawatu	55	(25)
2012–2015	Chiefs	58	(5)
2015–2019	Leicester Tigers	93	(40)
2019–	Kamaishi Seawaves		
- Correct as of 19 May 2019

Michael Fitzgerald (born 3 February 1987) is a New Zealand rugby union player currently playing for Kamaishi Seawaves in Japan. He previously played for Leicester Tigers in England's Premiership Rugby, for the Chiefs in Super Rugby and Manawatu in the ITM Cup. His regular playing position is lock.

In 2013, he signed a contract extension with the Chiefs until 2015.

On 21 April 2015, it was announced he had signed for English Aviva Premiership side Leicester Tigers. Fitzgerald made his Leicester debut on 18 October 2015 in a 28–16 win against London Irish. Fitzgerald played 25 times for Leicester that season, including scoring a try in their Champions Cup quarter final victory over Stade Français.

On 15 May 2019 he was announced as one of the players to leave Leicester following the end of the 2018–19 Premiership Rugby season and join Kamaishi Seawaves in Japan.
