= Joe Latta =

NZ rugby union player

- Born: Joe Latta; 7 April 1992 (age 34) Dunedin, New Zealand
- Height: 1.97 m (6 ft 6 in)
- Weight: 114 kg (17 st 13 lb)
- School: Otago Boys' High School; Wellington College

Rugby union career
- Position: Lock
Senior career
Years	Team	Apps	(Points)
2015–2017	Gloucester	20	(0)
2017–2019	Bristol Bears	13	(5)
2019–2022	Suntory Sungoliath	7	(0)
Provincial / State sides
Years	Team	Apps	(Points)
2011-2013	Wellington	3	(0)
2014-2015, 19	Otago	16	(5)
- Correct as of 23 October 2015
Super Rugby
Years	Team	Apps	(Points)
2015	Highlanders	5	(5)
- Correct as of 5 July 2015
International career
Years	Team	Apps	(Points)
2012	New Zealand U20		

Joe Latta (born 7 April 1992) is a New Zealand rugby union player for Suntory Sungoliath in the Top League. His regular playing position is Lock.

== Club career ==
Latta is the son of former Otago prop John Latta, however after finishing off his schooling at Wellington College he started his senior rugby career in New Zealand's capital city. He debuted for the Wellington Lions during the 2012 ITM Cup, but only managed a couple of appearances. He was to receive a serious setback at the end of the year as he badly injured his hip and it took him a full 16 months to recover. When he did get back to full fitness he started out in club rugby with the Zingari-Richmond club in his native Otago and was then signed to the Otago Razorbacks ITM Cup team for the 2014 season. Although Otago endured a disappointing campaign, Latta made a big impression in the second row scoring 1 try in 8 appearances. This form led to him being named as a member of the Highlanders wider training group for the 2015 Super Rugby season, and making his debut against the Brumbies on 24 April 2015.

On 11 November 2015, Latta signed a two-year deal to join English club Gloucester in the Aviva Premiership. On 3 April 2017, Latta signed a new deal to join local rivals Bristol Bears in the RFU Championship ahead of the 2017–18 season.

After his release from Bristol, Latta returns to New Zealand with old province Otago for the upcoming 2019 Mitre 10 Cup. Afterwards, Latta will travel to Japan with Suntory Sungoliath in the Top League competition on a two-year contract.

== International career ==
Latta represented New Zealand Under-20 during the 2012 IRB Junior World Championship in South Africa.
