= Craig Millar (rugby union) =

Japan international rugby union player

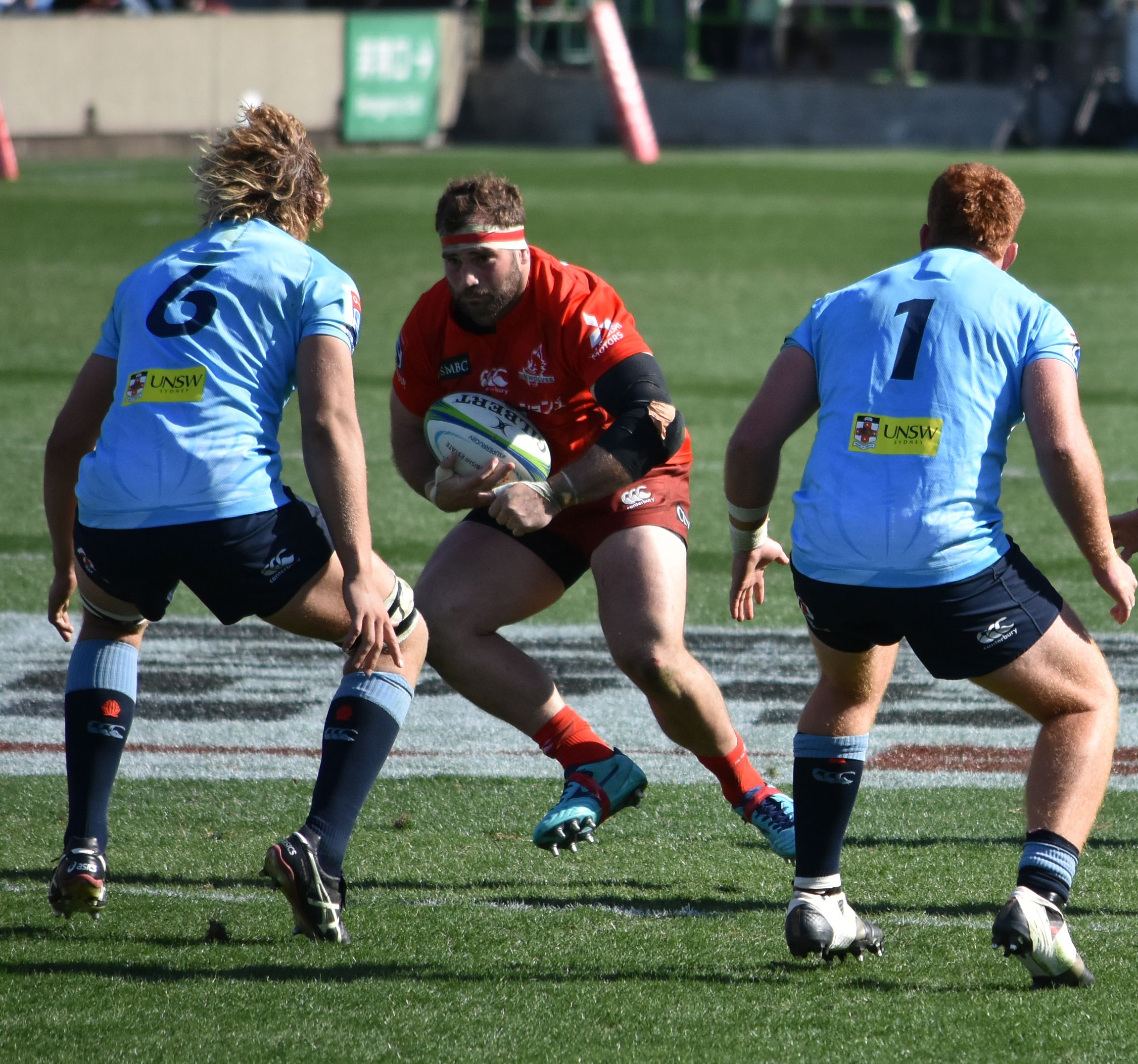
- Millar representing the Sunwolves during Super Rugby
- Full name: Craig William Millar
- Born: 29 October 1990 (age 36) Dunedin, New Zealand
- Height: 1.85 m (6 ft 1 in)
- Weight: 114 kg (251 lb; 17 st 13 lb)
- School: Otago Boys' High School
- University: University of Otago

Rugby union career
- Position: Prop
- Current team: Panasonic Wild Knights
Senior career
| Years | Team | Apps | (Points) |
| 2013–2017 | Otago | 44 | (20) |
| 2014−2017 | Highlanders | 12 | (0) |
| 2018–2019 | Sunwolves | 18 | (5) |
| 2018– | Panasonic Wild Knights | 69 | (20) |
- Correct as of 28 August 2023
International career
| Years | Team | Apps | (Points) |
| 2021–2023 | Japan | 17 | (0) |
| 2023 | Japan XV | 2 | (0) |
- Correct as of 8 October 2023

Craig William Millar (クレイグ・ミラー, Kureigu Mirā; born 29 October 1990) is a professional rugby union player who plays as a prop for Japan Rugby League One club Saitama Wild Knights. Born in New Zealand, he represents Japan at international level after qualifying on residency grounds.

== Early life ==
Millar is a native of the Otago region in New Zealand's South Island, having been born and raised in the city of Dunedin. He attended the prestigious Otago Boys' High School in his hometown where he played first XV rugby before going on to study accounting at the University of Otago. After graduating, he split his time working as an accountant with building a rugby career, initially playing for Pirates in Otago's local club rugby competition.

== Club career ==
Millar first broke into the Otago squad for the 2013 ITM Cup and enjoyed a standout debut season, earning 11 caps and scoring 1 try in the process as the Razorbacks reached the Championship semi-finals before going down to Hawke's Bay. Injury caused him to miss the entire 2014 New Zealand domestic season before he bounced back the following year playing in all 11 of Otago's games as they once again fell at the Championship semi-final stage, this time losing out 34–14 to Wellington.

Otago and Millar were again in fine form in 2016, with the Razorbacks finishing top of the Championship log and making it all the way to the playoff final before being surprisingly defeated at home by North Harbour while Millar was once again an ever-present playing 12 times, 9 of which were from the start and contributing a career high 3 season tries.

Impressive performances for the Otago Razorbacks throughout the 2013 New Zealand domestic season brought Millar to the attention of local Super Rugby franchise, the Highlanders, who included him in their wider training group for the 2014 Super Rugby season. He made 4 substitute appearances during his first campaign with the Highlanders, not a bad return as he spent the year as the franchise's third choice loosehead behind the more experienced Kane Hames and Chris King.

Unfortunately for him, all the momentum he had built up in his career through 2013 and the early part of 2014 came to a grinding halt when injury ruled him out of the 2014 New Zealand domestic season and the 2015 Super Rugby season, meaning that Millar would play no part in the Highlanders maiden Super Rugby triumph. He did, however, make a comeback with Otago in the second half of 2015 which earned him a recall to the Highlanders wider training group for the 2016 season and this time serving as back up to Daniel Lienert-Brown and Brendon Edmonds, he managed another 4 substitute appearances.

Tony Brown replaced the Japan bound Jamie Joseph as Highlanders head-coach ahead of the 2017 Super Rugby season and having worked with Millar before at provincial level, he saw fit to promote him to the franchise's senior squad ahead of his first campaign in charge.

Jamie Joseph announced ahead of the 2018 Super Rugby season that Millar will join his Sunwolves squad alongside several former Highlanders teammates.

== Career statistics ==
=== Club summary ===
As of 15 February 2018

| Season | Team | Games | Starts | Sub | Mins | Tries | Cons | Pens | Drops | Points | Yel | Red |
|---|---|---|---|---|---|---|---|---|---|---|---|---|
| 2014 | Highlanders | 4 | 0 | 4 | 61 | 0 | 0 | 0 | 0 | 0 | 0 | 0 |
| 2016 | Highlanders | 4 | 0 | 4 | 50 | 0 | 0 | 0 | 0 | 0 | 0 | 0 |
| 2017 | Highlanders | 4 | 0 | 4 | 71 | 0 | 0 | 0 | 0 | 0 | 0 | 0 |
| Total | | 12 | 0 | 12 | 182 | 0 | 0 | 0 | 0 | 0 | 0 | 0 |
