= Hamish Northcott =

NZ rugby union player (born 1992)

- Born: 6 August 1992 (age 34) Feilding, New Zealand
- Height: 1.83 m (6 ft 0 in)
- Weight: 96 kg (212 lb)
- School: Feilding High School
- University: Massey University

Rugby union career
- Position(s): Second five-eighth, Centre
Provincial / State sides
Years	Team	Apps	(Points)
2012–2019	Manawatu	53	(20)
- Correct as of 14 October 2018
Super Rugby
Years	Team	Apps	(Points)
2015	Blues	6	(0)
- Correct as of 12 June 2015

Hamish Northcott (born 6 August 1992) is a New Zealand rugby union player who played as a Second five-eighth or Centre for Manawatu in the Mitre 10 Cup.

He also played for the Hurricanes Development team in 2013 and the Blues in Super Rugby.

== Career ==
Northcott attended Feilding High School before joining the Manawatu Turbos in the Mitre 10 Cup.

He debuted for Manawatu in the 2012 season making only one appearance and then played four times the following year. In 2014 he finally nailed down a place as a starter and was a key member of the Turbos side which finished top of the ITM Cup Championship division.

Northcott has also been a member of the Hurricanes development side.

Some strong performances in the Turbos midfield during 2014 earned him a Super Rugby contract with the Blues for 2015 coached by Sir John Kirwan. He played four games at Centre, one at 2nd 5/8 and was a substitute in his other game. He was in the first three games of the season (against the Chiefs, Stormers and Cheetahs) before Charles Piutau was moved from Fullback to Centre. However, Francis Saili and George Moala were the preferred mid-field combination and played most of the season's games. Northcott played the last two games at Centre against the Crusaders and Highlanders. However, the Blues did not sign Northcott for the 2016 season.

Although not appearing again at Super Rugby level he continued to be a regular starting player for the Manawatu team up to and including the 2019 season.

Northcott also played for the New Zealand Universities rugby team from 2014 to 2019.

In July 2020 Northcott reached 100 games in the Manawatu Senior A competition for his club (Massey) University. He continued to play for the university club up to the 2022 season.

He worked on a Pahiatua sheep-and-beef farm and coached juniors in Rippa rugby.
