= Brendon Edmonds =

NZ rugby union player

Brendon Edmonds (Doogie)
- Born: 28 November 1990 (age 35) Ongaonga, Hawke's Bay, New Zealand
- Height: 1.83 m (6 ft 0 in)
- Weight: 112 kg (17 st 9 lb)
- School: Central Hawkes Bay College / Ongaonga Primary

Rugby union career
- Position: Prop
Provincial / State sides
Years	Team	Apps	(Points)
2011–2015	Hawke's Bay	48	(10)
Super Rugby
Years	Team	Apps	(Points)
2014	Hurricanes	1	(0)
2015–16	Highlanders	24	(5)
International career
Years	Team	Apps	(Points)
2014	Māori All Blacks	3	(0)

Brendon Edmonds (born 28 November 1990) is a former New Zealand rugby union player who played as a prop for Hawke's Bay in the ITM Cup and the Highlanders in Super Rugby.

== Career ==
Hailing from the Hawke's Bay Region, Edmonds played during the 2006–2008 seasons for the Central Hawkes Bay College 1st XV along with the likes of Dominic Bird, Mua Sala & Andrew Burne. Edmonds then represented Hawkes Bay at Under 16, 18 and 20 level before making his senior breakthrough in 2011 where he came on in the ITM Cup Championship final in Palmerston North against Manawatu, helping his Magpies side win the title and get promoted to the 2012 ITM Cup Premiership. However it was the following year that Edmonds began making a name for himself with some strong displays in a good campaign for the Magpies.

He was not initially named in any Super Rugby squads for the 2014 season, but some injuries to front-row players at the Hurricanes saw him called up to their wider training squad. He debuted on 18 April 2014 as a second-half substitute in a 39–20 victory for the Hurricanes over theBlues in Wellington.

Edmonds signed for theHighlanders for the 2015 Super Rugby season. He was described as a powerful scrummager with a high work rate who performed well in the successful 2015 Super Rugby season for the Highlanders as they won the Super Rugby championship.

His career was ended by a serious knee injury against the Western Force on 1 April 2016, which left him with nerve damage in his left knee.

== Personal life ==
Edmonds is a New Zealander of Māori descent (Ngāti Kahungunu descent).
