= Dominic Bird =

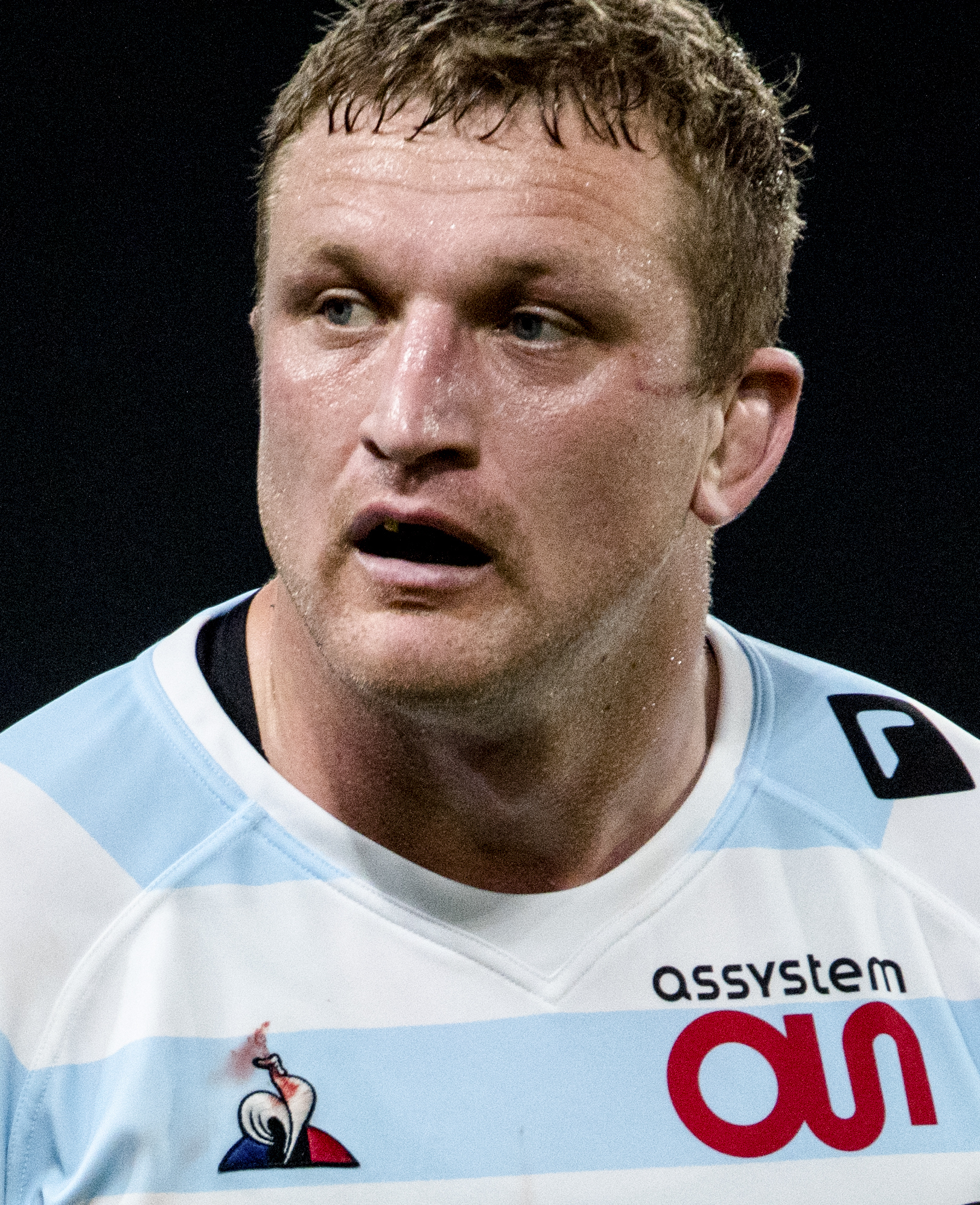
- Born: Dominic Joseph Bird; 9 April 1991 (age 35) Waipukurau, New Zealand
- Height: 206 cm (6 ft 9 in)
- Weight: 124 kg (19 st 7 lb; 273 lb)
- School: Central Hawke's Bay College
- University: Lincoln University

Rugby union career
- Position: Lock
- Current team: Wellington, Hurricanes
Senior career
Years	Team	Apps	(Points)
2011–2017	Canterbury	53	(25)
2013–2015	Crusaders	31	(5)
2016–2018	Chiefs	29	(15)
2018–2021	Racing 92	75	(20)
2021–	Wellington	18	(0)
2023–	Hurricanes	5	(0)
- Correct as of 16 August 2023
International career
Years	Team	Apps	(Points)
2011	New Zealand U20	5	(0)
2013–2014	New Zealand	2	(0)
2013–2017	Barbarian F.C.	4	(0)
- Correct as of 27 January 2023

Dominic Bird (born 9 April 1991) is a New Zealand rugby union player who plays as a lock and has represented the All Blacks. He has also played for Canterbury and Wellington in the Mitre 10 Cup, the Crusaders and Chiefs in Super Rugby. He has also played for Racing 92 in the French Top 14.

== Early life ==
Bird was educated at Central Hawkes Bay College. He debuted for the 1st XV in 2007 and went on to captain the side in 2008 in a historic victory over Hastings Boys High school alongside other key players the likes of Bredon Edmonds (NZ Maori), Mua Sala (Spain), Andrew Burne (Napier Tech), Jack Richardson (Ruatoria CITY). Born in Hawke's Bay, Bird moved to Christchurch where he attended Lincoln University on a Rugby Scholarship.

== Career ==
Bird was a member of the New Zealand Under 20 team which won the 2011 IRB Junior World Championship in Italy.

Bird was a member of the Crusaders Wider Training Group in 2012 and was selected as a senior squad member for the 2013 Super Rugby season. Bird was selected for the 2013 All Blacks wider training squad of 38 to train for the June test series against France and went on to make his international debut against Japan in November, starting for them in the 54–6 win before being replaced by Sam Whitelock. Bird broke the record for tallest All Black in history on his debut, standing 1 cm taller than previous record holder, the now-retired Mark Cooksley. Bird made another appearance for the All Blacks one year later, starting against Scotland in a 24–16 win on the 2014 end-of-year tour after being called in as cover for Luke Romano.

Bird switched Super Rugby teams to the Chiefs for the 2016 Super Rugby season, forming a formidable locking partnership with All Blacks team-mate Brodie Retallick. Bird became a regular starter for the Chiefs, including against the touring British and Irish Lions team in 2017, with the Chiefs losing to the Lions 34–6. Bird also went on to start in the knockout rounds but the Chiefs were eliminated from the competition in the semi-final against Bird's former team the Crusaders who went on to win the competition. After a solid Mitre 10 Cup campaign, Bird was re-selected for the All Blacks for the 2017 end-of-year tour after three years' absence from international rugby. This came after Bird started against the All Blacks for the Barbarians in a 22–31 loss to the All Blacks. Bird started for the All Blacks against a French XV on 14 November and was not subbed off, with the All Blacks winning 28–23.

On 1 June 2018, Bird travelled to France to sign for Top 14 side Racing 92 ahead of the 2018–19 season.
