= Culum Retallick =

New Zealand rugby union player

- Born: Culum Retallick; 8 May 1985 (age 41) Rangiora, New Zealand
- Height: 1.99 m (6 ft 6 in)
- Weight: 114 kg (17 st 13 lb)
- School: Shirley Boys' High School
- Notable relative: Brodie Retallick (cousin)Andrew Retallick (brother)

Rugby union career
- Position: Lock
Provincial / State sides
Years	Team	Apps	(Points)
2007–17	Bay of Plenty	110	(50)
Super Rugby
Years	Team	Apps	(Points)
2010–11	Chiefs	20	(0)
2012	Highlanders	10	(0)
2013–15	Blues	17	(0)
2016−17	Rebels	19	(5)

Culum Retallick (born 8 May 1985) is a former New Zealand rugby union player who represented Bay of Plenty in the Mitre 10 Cup. He is the cousin of All Black Brodie Retallick.

== Playing career ==
Retallick came up through the Canterbury system but, unable to crack a deep ITM Cup squad, moved north to sign with Bay of Plenty for the 2007 Air New Zealand Cup. He made 7 starts in his debut season and by 2008 was a fixture in the starting lineup.

He made his 50th appearance for the side in a victory over Counties Manukau during the opening round of the 2011 ITM Cup on 17 July 2011. On 1 October 2016, he became the 17th player to earn 100 caps for Bay of Plenty as he captained the side against North Harbour.

After suffering two serious concussions during the 2017 Mitre 10 Cup season, Retallick was forced to retire in 2018.

=== Super Rugby ===
Retallick earned a contract with the Chiefs for the 2010 Super 14 season, and turned in an excellent debut campaign, appearing in all 13 games for the team including 10 starts. In 2011, however, he struggled to get playing time and was limited to 7 appearances, all as a substitute.

For the 2012 season, Retallick was signed by the Highlanders, where he made 10 appearances, mainly as a substitute. A strong season for Bay of Plenty in the 2012 ITM Cup saw him signed for the Blues, where he served as a regular starter in 2013. However, a serious knee injury saw him ruled out for the entire 2014 season, and he struggled to win back his starting job the following year.

For the 2016 season, Retallick moved to Australia, signing for the Melbourne Rebels.

== Super Rugby statistics ==
Season	Team	Games	Starts	Sub	Mins	Tries	Cons	Pens	Drops	Points	Yel	Red
2010	Chiefs	13	10	3	752	0	0	0	0	0	0	0
2011	Chiefs	7	0	7	138	0	0	0	0	0	0	0
2012	Highlanders	10	1	9	394	0	0	0	0	0	0	0
2013	Blues	11	10	1	685	0	0	0	0	0	1	0
2014	Blues	0	0	0	0	0	0	0	0	0	0	0
2015	Blues	6	4	2	270	0	0	0	0	0	0	0
2016	Rebels	6	2	4	262	1	0	0	0	5	0	0
2017	Rebels	13	7	6	605	0	0	0	0	0	1	0
Total		66	34	32	3106	1	0	0	0	5	2	0
