= Marco Kotze =

South African rugby union player

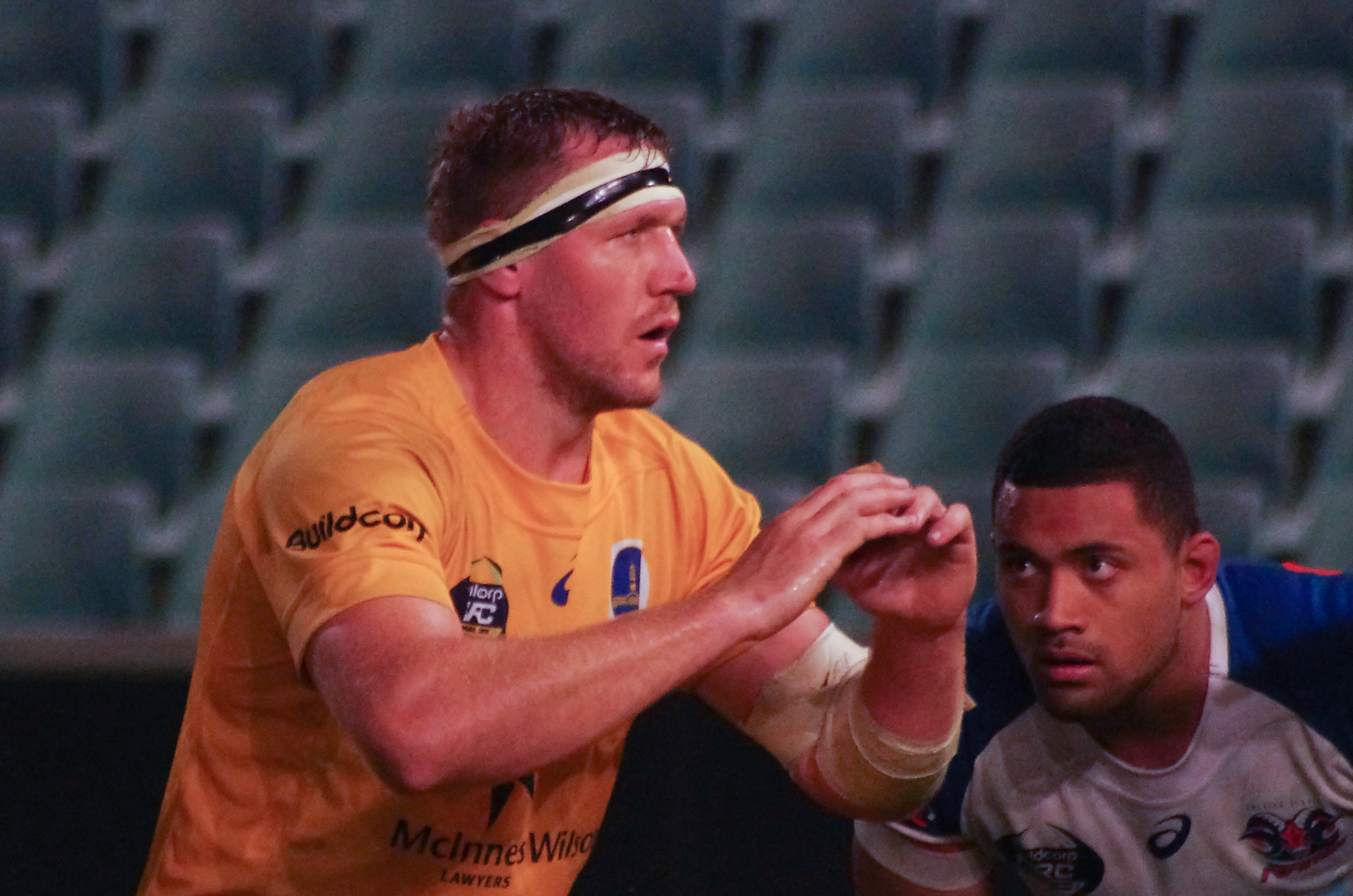
- Born: 25 August 1986 (age 40) Germiston, South Africa
- Height: 1.94 m (6 ft 4 1/2 in)
- Weight: 118 kg (18 st 8 lb; 260 lb)
- School: Hoërskool Marais Viljoen, Alberton

Rugby union career
- Position: Flanker / Number eight / Lock / Winger
- Current team: Marmande
Youth career
- 1999–2006: Golden Lions
- 2007: Sharks
Amateur team(s)
| Years | Team | Apps | (Points) |
| 2006 | UJ | | |
| 2007–2009 | Crusaders | | |
| 2013–2014 | GPS | | |
Senior career
| Years | Team | Apps | (Points) |
| 2006 | Golden Lions | 5 | (0) |
| 2010–2012 | Falcons | 35 | (25) |
| 2014 | Brisbane City | 9 | (5) |
| 2015 | Reds | 11 | (10) |
| 2015 | Tasman | 11 | (10) |
| 2015–2018 | Agen | 49 | (15) |
| 2018–2020 | Marmande | 29 | (0) |
- Correct as of 16 October 2015

Marco Kotze (born 25 August 1986) is a South African rugby union player, currently playing with French Fédérale 1 side Marmande. He originally played as a winger, but has been subsequently converted to a loose-forward or a lock.

== Career ==
=== Youth ===
Kotze went to Laerskool Randhart in Alberton, in a team that won the Super Twelve national competition for primary schools, playing alongside future Lions Super Rugby player Derick Minnie. Kotze earned a call-up to the Golden Lions' Under-13 Craven Week squad.

He went to Hoërskool Marais Viljoen in Alberton, where he appeared mainly as a winger and also earned a selection to the Golden Lions' Craven Week team in 2004.

He progressed through the different age groups at the Golden Lions, playing at Under-19 level in 2005 and at Under-21 level in 2006. He also played for university side UJ during this time, representing them at the National Club Championships in 2006.

=== Golden Lions ===
He made his first class debut for the Golden Lions in the 2006 Vodacom Cup, coming on as a first-half substitute in their match against the Western Province in Cape Town. He started his first match a week later, with the Golden Lions losing 29–35 to near rivals Pumas in Witbank. One more start followed against the Falcons, as well as a further two appearances off the bench.

=== Sharks ===
In 2007, Kotze made the move to Durban to join the Sharks. He played for the Sharks U21 side during the 2007 season, but was never involved at first team level. During this time, he also played club rugby for Crusaders.

=== Falcons ===
He moved back to Gauteng in 2010 by joining the Falcons. By now, he was fully transformed into a loose forward and he made six appearances for the Falcons during the 2010 Vodacom Cup. He also scored his first try in first class rugby during this competition, scoring two tries in the Falcons' 33–65 defeat to Namibian side Welwitschias. He made his Currie Cup debut in the latter half of 2010, starting their 2010 Currie Cup First Division match against the Boland Cavaliers in Kempton Park. He made one more Currie Cup appearance, against the Eastern Province Kings in Port Elizabeth.

In 2011, he was named as a member of the Falcons' leadership group for the 2011 Vodacom Cup season, making six appearances in the competition. He played in a further eight matches in the 2011 Currie Cup First Division competition, where he scored his first Currie Cup try in their match against the Border Bulldogs in East London.

He scored one try in six starts during the 2012 Vodacom Cup competition and one try in seven starts in the 2012 Currie Cup First Division competition.

=== Move to Australia ===
In 2013, Brumbies head coach Jake White convinced Kotze to move to Australia to further his rugby career, but he had limited opportunities due to a shoulder injury. At the end of 2013, he moved north to Queensland, where he joined club side GPS Rugby in Brisbane.

=== Brisbane City / Reds ===
His performances for GPS earned him an inclusion in the Brisbane City squad that played in the inaugural 2014 National Rugby Championship. He played in seven of Brisbane City's eight regular season matches to help his side qualify for the semi-finals by the competition after finishing in third position on the log. He also scored a try in their derby match with Queensland Country to help his side to a 29–13 victory. Kotze's impact continued in the play-off stages of the competition, starting both the semi-final – which saw Brisbane City run out 32–26 winners against NSW Country Eagles – and the final, where he played 76 minutes of a 37–26 victory over Perth Spirit to see his side become the first side to win the NRC trophy.

Shortly after the end of the season, Kotze was included in Super Rugby franchise the Reds' Elite Development Squad for the 2015 Super Rugby season. He was also named in the starting line-up for the side for their opening match of the season against the Brumbies.
