= Michael Fatialofa =

New Zealand rugby union player

- Born: 14 September 1992 (age 34) Auckland, New Zealand
- Height: 1.99 m (6 ft 6 in)
- Weight: 118 kg (18 st 8 lb; 260 lb)
- School: Mount Albert Grammar School

Rugby union career
- Position: Lock
- Current team: Worcester Warriors
Senior career
Years	Team	Apps	(Points)
2011–2014	Southland	36	(0)
2015−2018	Auckland	24	(5)
2016−2018	Hurricanes	38	(10)
2018−	Worcester Warriors	20	(5)
- Correct as of 19 November 2018
International career
Years	Team	Apps	(Points)
2010	New Zealand Schools	3	
2016	Barbarians F.C	3	

Michael Fatialofa (born 14 September 1992) is a New Zealand rugby union player who currently plays as a lock for Worcester Warriors in the Premiership.

== Early career ==
Born in Auckland, Fatialofa was educated at Mount Albert Grammar School in his hometown where he played first XV rugby for 3 years and helped them to lift the Auckland Schools title in 2010. Rated as one of the top New Zealand lock prospects at the time, it came as something of a surprise when he opted to move to the country's far south to play club rugby with the Invercargill Rugby Club (Blues) in Southland after he'd finished high school.

== Senior career ==
He spent the first 4 years of his senior career playing provincial rugby for Southland with whom he racked up 36 appearances. His first season with the Stags saw him play 3 times as they were relegated from the ITM Cup Premiership. The men from Invercargill finished 4th on the Championship log for the next three seasons which saw them qualify for the promotion playoffs, however, each time they lost at the semi-final stage to the eventual champions, going down to Counties Manukau, Tasman and Manawatu respectively. In 2013 and 2014, he was a key figure in Southland's line up, playing all 22 matches across both seasons.

He moved back home to Auckland ahead of the 2015 ITM Cup with the switch seeing him join one of New Zealand's traditional rugby powerhouses. He played 11 times in his first season with the blue and whites and scored his first ever provincial try to help his new side finish 2nd on the Premiership log and reach the playoff final where they would lose out 25–23 to Canterbury.

2016 would not be such a happy year for Auckland as they finished up 5th on the Premiership log, missing out on the playoffs altogether, Fatialofa himself played in 8 of their 10 matches during the season.

Four years of toil with Southland and an impressive season with Auckland saw him finally earn a Super Rugby contract with the Wellington-based Hurricanes ahead of the 2016 Super Rugby season. His first year in New Zealand's capital turned out to be a roaring success as he formed an impressive second row partnership with Vaea Fifita as the 'Canes, beaten finalists in 2015, went one better in 2016 and were crowned Super Rugby champions following a 20–3 victory over South African side, the Lions in the tournament final. Fatialofa played 15 times during his debut Super Rugby campaign.

On 28 March 2018, Fatialofa signed for England club Worcester Warriors in the Aviva Premiership on a two-year contract from the 2018–19 season. On 4 January 2020 he suffered a serious neck injury in a match against Saracens. He underwent surgery, and left intensive care on 23 January after which he was told to prepare for life in a wheelchair. In fact he was able to walk unaided by 21 March 2020; a recovery his wife described as miraculous: "proof that God is never limited to human wisdom."

== International career ==
He was a New Zealand Schools representative in 2010.

On 5 November 2016, he featured for the Barbarians in their 31–31 draw against South Africa at Wembley Stadium. He played the entire 80 minutes in the number 5 jersey in a side containing his Hurricanes team-mates, Reggie Goodes and Brad Shields.

== Career honours ==
Southland

• Ranfurly Shield - 2011

Hurricanes

- Super Rugby - 2016

Auckland

• Mitre 10 cup - 2018

== Super Rugby statistics ==
As of 24 January 2017

Season	Team	Games	Starts	Sub	Mins	Tries	Cons	Pens	Drops	Points	Yel	Red
2016	Hurricanes	15	14	1	993	0	0	0	0	0	0	0
Total		15	14	1	993	0	0	0	0	0	0	0

== Personal life ==
Fatialofa is a committed Christian. He is married to Tatiana: he and his wife attend Freedom Church in Worcester.
