= Daniel Bowden =

NZ rugby union player

Dan Bowden
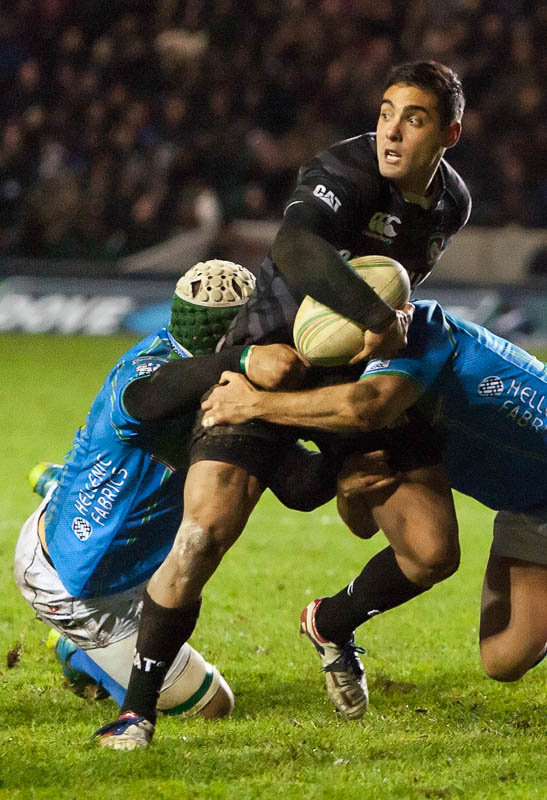
- Born: Daniel Russell Bowden; 1 April 1986 (age 40) Auckland, New Zealand
- Height: 1.78 m (5 ft 10 in)
- Weight: 87 kg (13 st 10 lb)

Rugby union career
- Position: Fly-half
Senior career
Years	Team	Apps	(Points)
2007	Parma	4	(23)
2010–11	London Irish	53	(20)
2012–14	Leicester Tigers	28	
2014	Yamaha Júbilo	3	
2016-17	Bath	8	
- Correct as of 3 September 2017
Provincial / State sides
Years	Team	Apps	(Points)
2005–2007, 2015	Northland	27	(96)
2008	Otago	8	(41)
2009, 2017–	Auckland	6	(60)
- Correct as of 3 September 2017
Super Rugby
Years	Team	Apps	(Points)
2008–2009	Highlanders	24	(78)
2010	Crusaders	6	(0)
2015−2016	Blues	6	(43)
- Correct as of 12 June 2015
International career
Years	Team	Apps	(Points)
2004	New Zealand schools		
2005	New Zealand Under 19s		
2007	New Zealand Under 21s		

Daniel Russell Bowden (born 1 April 1986) is a former New Zealand rugby union player, currently the Attack Coach for Cardiff Rugby.

Bowden played three seasons for the Northland Taniwha in the National Provincial Championship. He debuted at the age of 18, earning player of the year in 2007.

Bowden transferred from Northland to Otago for the 2008 Air New Zealand Cup, where he played in eight games. His first match was on 9 August 2008 in Dunedin when he came off the bench against Canterbury and kicked a penalty. Bowden went on to score 41 points in total for Otago in 2008. Bowden then signed a two-year contract with the Auckland Rugby Union. He said the decision to move north was based solely on wanting to get back to be with his family and girlfriend, Football Ferns captain Hayley Moorwood. Bowden's Auckland career came to halt after only four games in the 2009 season due to a season ending ankle injury.

Bowden played his first match for the Highlanders on Friday 15 February 2008 when he started against the Reds in Brisbane, he kicked one penalty. Since then he went on to play a further 10 matches for the southern Super Rugby side in 2008, starting in 8 of them. Bowden finished the season with 23 points. In 2009 Bowden returned to the Highlanders franchise. In the 2009 season he started in all of the matches, either playing first-five or second-five. Known as very good attacker with quick footwork and a great passing game, he scored more than 50 points in the 2009 season. He was later that year signed by the Crusaders for the 2010 Super 14 season. Bowden was picked up in the draft by the Crusaders in the 2010 Crusaders squad . After an injury in the preseason, Bowden missed the first 5 games of the season, then starred in his debut for the Crusaders against the Cheetahs playing at flyhalf and was named Man of the Match. He went on to form a partnership playing Second five-eighth outside All Black Dan Carter, and started in the semi-final against the Bulls in Soweto.

Bowden signed for London Irish on a two-year contract, and joined up with Irish at the end of the current Super 14 Season. Bowden had a superb first year in the Aviva Premiership. Initially playing inside centre before moving to flyhalf, Bowden showed excellent touches on attack and was competent on defence. He displayed consistency and was selected to start 31 of 32 games in the 2010/2011 season. His performances for the club earned him Players' Player of the Year.

He joined Premiership club Leicester Tigers for the 2012/13 season. Dan Bowden had an injury interrupted first season at Leicester, but when did play showed flashes of brilliance. He played in 15 games, and won the Premiership Rugby's Try of the Year award. He so far has performed well at inside centre in his second season.

In May 2014, he signed with the Blues to return to New Zealand for the 2015 and 2016 Super Rugby seasons.

Bowden returned to England to join Bath back in the Aviva Premiership on a lucrative two-and-a-half-year contract from January 2016.

Dan was the Talent Identification and Recruitment Manager for Auckland Rugby. He is also an assistant coach in the Mitre 10 cup, helping guide Auckland to winning the Premiership in 2018 and runners up in the 2020 Premiership.

Coaching career, Bowden joined Toshiba Brave Lupus after coaching Auckland in the NPC for 5 successful seasons. He helped turn an underperforming Toshiba team into back to back League One champions. Before joining Eddie Jones as Attack Coach for the National team. Japan improved from 16th to 12th, including memorable wins against Māori All Blacks, Wales and Georgia. All beating USA, Canada, Samoa and Tonga by record margins.
