= Reggie Goodes =

South African rugby union player

- Full name: Norman Reginald Goodes
- Born: 4 April 1991 (age 35) Witbank, South Africa
- Height: 1.84 m (6 ft 0 in)
- Weight: 116 kg (18 st 4 lb; 256 lb)
- School: Afrikaans Hoër Seunskool; Wellington College

Rugby union career
- Position: Loosehead Prop / Hooker
- Current team: Wellington / Hurricanes
Senior career
| Years | Team | Apps | (Points) |
| 2010−2016 | Wellington | 45 | (25) |
| 2012−2016 | Hurricanes | 60 | (35) |
- Correct as of 23 January 2017
International career
| Years | Team | Apps | (Points) |
| 2009 | New Zealand Schools | | |
- Correct as of 23 January 2017

Norman Reginald Goodes (born 4 April 1991) is a former South African-born rugby union player who played as a prop for Wellington in New Zealand's domestic Mitre 10 Cup from 2010 to 2016 and for the Hurricanes in the international Super Rugby competition from 2012 to 2016.

He announced his retirement in early 2018 on medical advice after suffering a number of concussions.

== Early career ==
Born in Witbank, South Africa, Goodes emigrated to New Zealand with his family in 2006. Having attended Afrikaans Hoër Seunskool in Pretoria, he completed his schooling at Wellington College where he played first XV rugby for 3 years. After graduating high school, he started playing for Poneke in Wellington's local club rugby competition.

== Senior career ==
He first played provincial rugby with Wellington during the 2010 ITM Cup, making a solitary appearance in a 20-11 victory over Tasman. Serving primarily as back-up to the more experienced Jacob Ellison through 2011, Goodes did manage to earn more game time, appearing in 7 matches with 5 of these appearances from the start. He only played 5 times during 2012, but was much more of a regular in 2013, featuring in 11 of the Lions 12 matches during a year which saw them finish as runner-up to Canterbury following a 29-13 defeat in the ITM Cup Premiership final.

2014 was an absolute disaster of a year as far as the men from New Zealand's capital were concerned as they finished bottom of the Premiership log with just 1 win from 10 outings and were subsequently relegated to the Championship division for 2015. A head injury meant that Goodes could only play twice in 2014 and was left watching helplessly from the sidelines as his team-mates struggled on the field.

Wellington were unable to win promotion at the first time of asking, finishing 2nd behind Hawke's Bay in the Championship standings before being defeated 26-25 by the same opposition in the playoff final. Goodes had fully recovered from the previous season's injury struggles and played 11 of the Lions 12 games, netting his first 2 provincial tries in the process.

In 2016, Wellington once again failed to gain promotion, this time after being runners-up to Otago on the Championship log they were surprisingly defeated 40-37 at home by North Harbour in the playoff semi-finals. Goodes once again had injuries to contend with and was only able to play 5 times during the campaign, but despite this, he managed to score an impressive 4 tries.

== Super Rugby ==
At the age of 21 and with barely a season and a half of provincial experience under his belt, Goodes was named in the Hurricanes squad for the 2012 Super Rugby season. Despite being hindered by a shoulder injury sustained in a pre-season hit out against the Chiefs, he acquitted himself well during his debut season of Super Rugby, starting 4 times and playing 8 games in total. 12 more appearances, with all but one coming from the replacements bench, and a debut Super Rugby try followed in 2013 before he also spent large parts of the 2014 season as a bit part player.

He really started to establish himself as a regular for the 'Canes in 2015, starting 16 games and scoring 3 tries to help his franchise reach the Super Rugby final where they lost 21-14 at home to the Highlanders. The following year they were able to go one step further and lifted the Super Rugby title following a 20-3 victory over South African side, the Lions. He played 13 times and helped himself to another 3 tries, however he was forced to sit out the final stages of the season following a head injury received in a match against the Crusaders.

Goodes did not play any Super Rugby matches in 2017 due to an ongoing problem with concussions, and he retired in February 2018, aged 26, for the same reason.

== International ==
Goodes was a New Zealand Schools representative in 2009.

On 5 November 2016, he featured for the Barbarians in their 31-31 draw against the land of his birth, South Africa at Wembley Stadium. He started the match wearing the number 1 jersey in a side containing his Hurricanes team-mates, Michael Fatialofa and Brad Shields before being substituted in the 51st minute by Rebels and Australia loosehead Toby Smith.

== Career Honours ==
Hurricanes

- Super Rugby - 2016

== Super Rugby Statistics ==
As of 24 January 2017

| Season | Team | Games | Starts | Sub | Mins | Tries | Cons | Pens | Drops | Points | Yel | Red |
|---|---|---|---|---|---|---|---|---|---|---|---|---|
| 2012 | Hurricanes | 8 | 4 | 4 | 387 | 0 | 0 | 0 | 0 | 0 | 0 | 0 |
| 2013 | Hurricanes | 12 | 1 | 11 | 250 | 1 | 0 | 0 | 0 | 5 | 0 | 0 |
| 2014 | Hurricanes | 10 | 3 | 7 | 371 | 0 | 0 | 0 | 0 | 0 | 0 | 0 |
| 2015 | Hurricanes | 17 | 16 | 1 | 997 | 3 | 0 | 0 | 0 | 15 | 0 | 0 |
| 2016 | Hurricanes | 13 | 13 | 0 | 764 | 3 | 0 | 0 | 0 | 15 | 0 | 0 |
| Total | | 60 | 37 | 23 | 2769 | 7 | 0 | 0 | 0 | 35 | 0 | 0 |
