= Brad Shields =

England international rugby union player

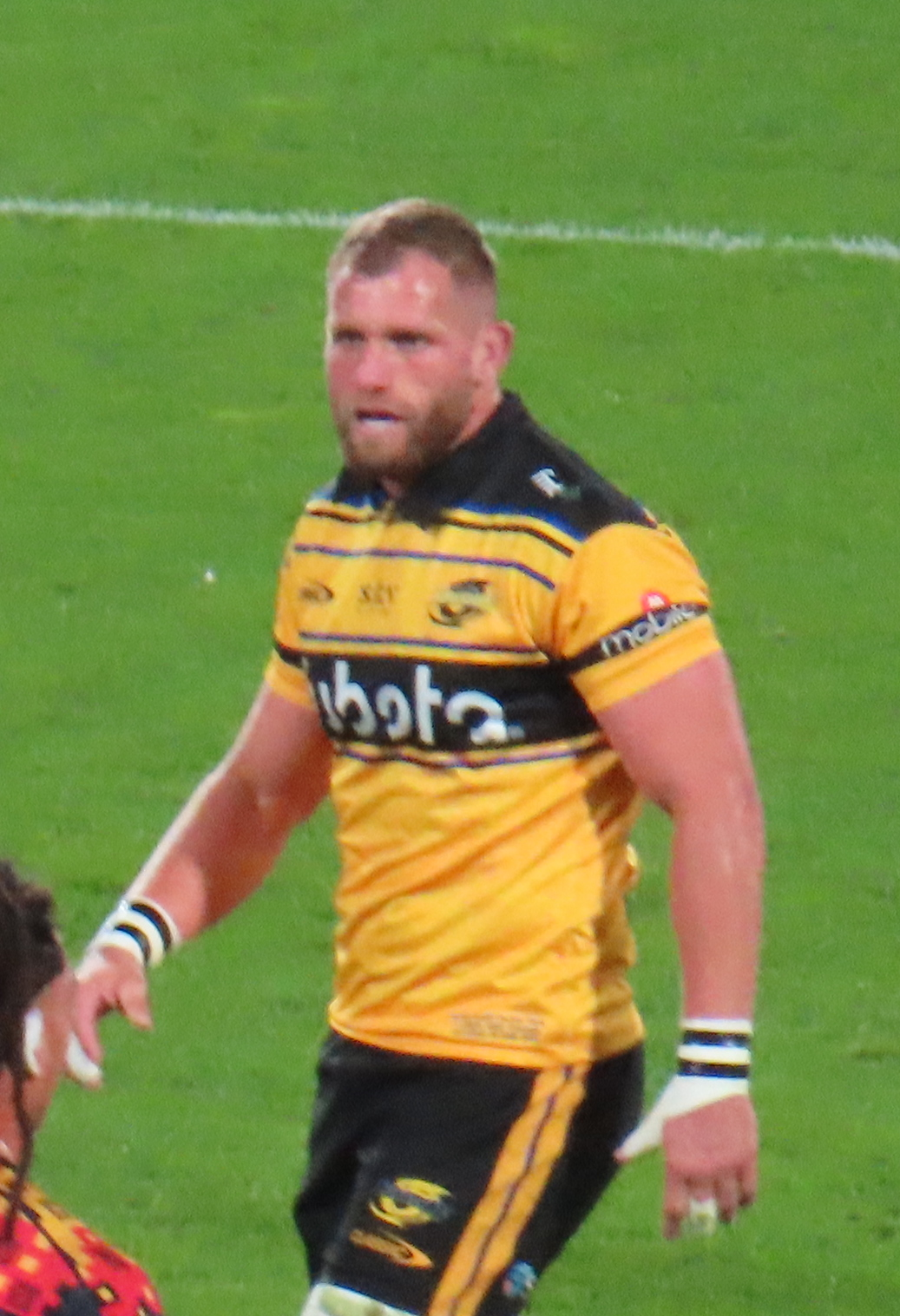
- Shields playing for the Hurricanes in the 2026 Super Rugby Pacific final
- Full name: Bradley David Fenner Shields
- Born: 2 April 1991 (age 35) Masterton, New Zealand
- Height: 1.93 m (6 ft 4 in)
- Weight: 111 kg (17 st 7 lb; 245 lb)
- School: Taita College

Rugby union career
- Position(s): Lock, Flanker, Number 8
- Current team: Wellington, Hurricanes
Senior career
Years	Team	Apps	(Points)
2010–2017	Wellington	60	(30)
2012–2018	Hurricanes	100	(45)
2018–2022	Wasps	80	(45)
2022	USA Perpignan	11	(0)
2023–	Wellington	24	(10)
2024–	Hurricanes	31	(20)
- Correct as of 11 April 2026
International career
Years	Team	Apps	(Points)
2011–2012	New Zealand U20	5	(5)
2018–2019	England	9	(10)
- Correct as of 16 November 2018

Bradley David Fenner Shields (born 2 April 1991) is a rugby union player for Wellington in the Bunnings NPC and Hurricanes. He played 8 times for the England national rugby union team in 2018 and 2019. In November 2017 he signed with Wasps before returning to New Zealand in 2023.

== Early career ==
Born in the town of Masterton, New Zealand, Shields attended Taita College in the suburb of Lower Hutt where he played first XV rugby and served as deputy head boy. After finishing high school, he began playing for Petone in Wellington's local club rugby competition while also captaining Wellington at under-20 level.

== Senior career ==
Shields made his provincial debut aged just 19 in 2010. Taking advantage of injuries to established players Rodney So'oialo and Serge Lilo, he played in a 52–23 victory away to North Harbour. That was to be his only appearance during the season. However, the following year he became much more of a regular, featuring 10 times and scoring his first 2 provincial tries as the Lions finished a disappointing 6th on the Premiership log.

After missing the entire 2012 ITM Cup due to injury, he returned fully charged in 2013 and played 11 of Wellington's 12 games in a season which saw them finish top of the Premiership log before being defeated 29–13 at home by Canterbury in the playoff final. 2014 would be a year of turmoil for the Lions as they came 7th and last in the Premiership, recording just 1 win in 10 games. Shields captained the side and was named as Wellington's Player of the Year for his efforts.

The Lions failed to gain promotion to the Premiership at the first time of asking, finishing 2nd, behind Hawke's Bay on the Championship log before being defeated by the same opposition in the playoff final, narrowly going down 26–25. Injury restricted Shields to just 6 matches in 2015 where he scored a try and picked up a yellow card.

2016 saw Wellington once again come to close to earning promotion but yet again falling just short. After another 2nd place log finish, this time behind Otago, they were upset at home by North Harbour, 40–37 in the playoff semi-finals. Shield played 9 of 11 games during the campaign.

It was announced on 19 November 2017 that he would join Wasps in 2018. Wasps entered administration on 17 October 2022 and Shields was made redundant along with all other players and coaching staff.

A move to the French Top 14 side USA Perpignan was confirmed on 26 October 2022.

== Super Rugby ==
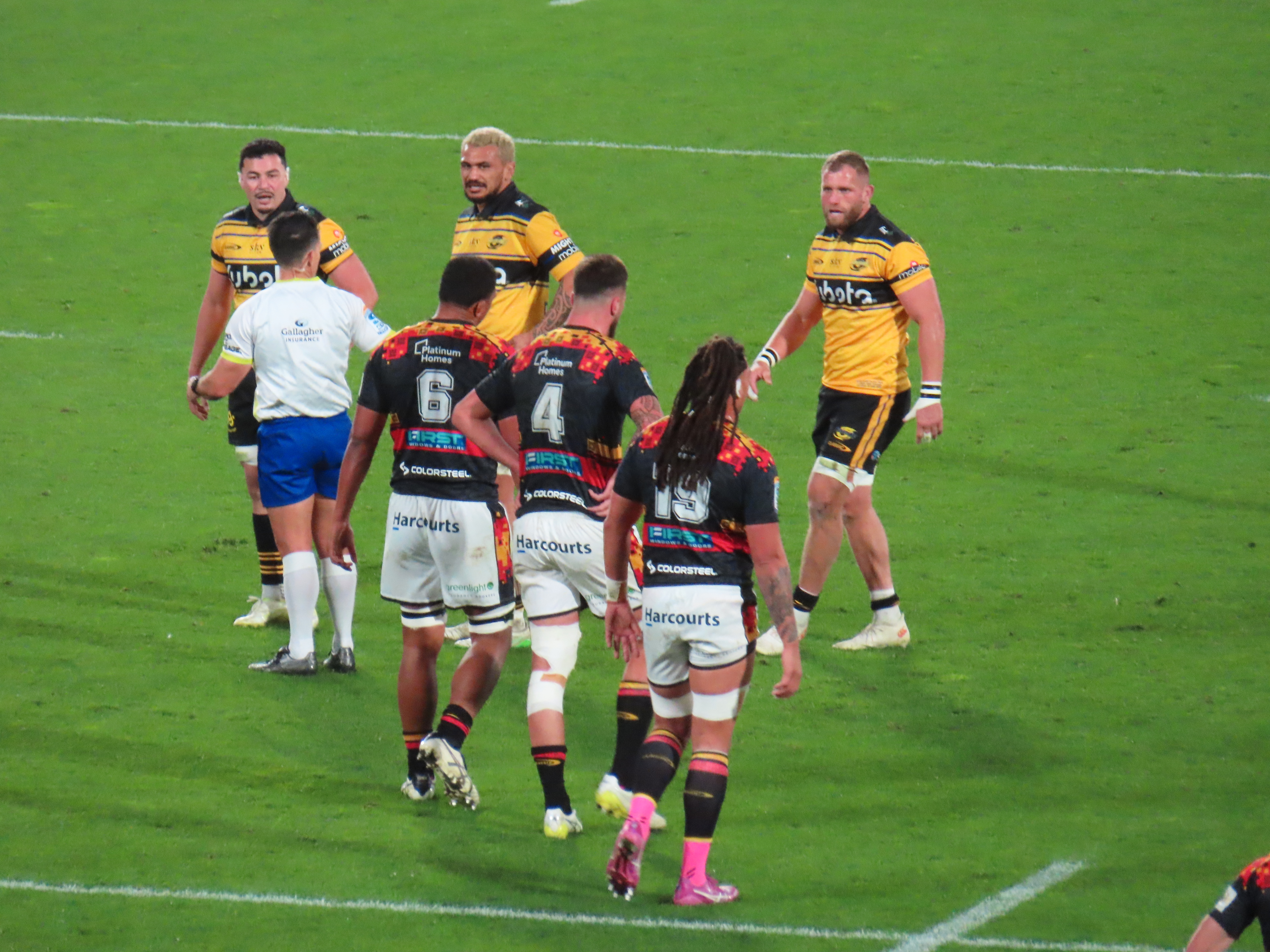
Shields playing for the Hurricanes in the 2026 Super Rugby Pacific final, alongside Isaia Walker-Leawere and Brayden Iose.

With just a little over a season's experience of provincial rugby under his belt, Shields was signed to a Super Rugby contract with the Hurricanes ahead of the 2012 season. Faced with stiff competition for a place in the starting line up from the likes of Jack Lam, Faifili Levave, Karl Lowe and Victor Vito, he acquitted himself well and went on to play 13 times during his debut season of Super Rugby, with 10 of these appearances coming from the replacements bench.

Shields enjoyed a breakout year in 2013, playing in all 16 of the Hurricanes games, including 13 starts and 3 tries before a knee injury hindered him in 2014, restricting him to only 6 matches.

The Hurricanes were one of Super Rugby's form teams through 2015 and 2016, finishing as runner-up in 2015 following a 21–14 home defeat to the Highlanders, before finally getting their hands on the trophy at the end of the 2016 season after a 20–3 victory over the Lions in the final. Shields featured heavily in both campaigns, playing 18 times in 2015 and 16 times in 2016 as well as contributing 2 tries in each season.

On 27 June 2017, Shields captained the Hurricanes to a historic draw against the touring British and Irish Lions side. Shields was replaced by Reed Prinsep in the 56th minute, with the Hurricanes finishing the game at 31–31.

Shields was named as captain of the Hurricanes for the 2018 season despite his upcoming departure, with regular captain Dane Coles ruled out for the season with a torn ACL.

In 2026, Shields formed part of the Hurricanes squad which won the 2026 Super Rugby Pacific season. On 20 June, the Hurricanes defeated the Chiefs 60–5 in the final. With this, he became the first Hurricanes player to win two Super Rugby titles (the first in 2016).

== International ==
Shields was a New Zealand Under-17 representative in 2008 before being a member of the New Zealand Under-20 side which won the 2011 IRB Junior World Championship in Italy, scoring 1 try in 5 matches at the tournament. He had been named in All Blacks training squads in 2012 and 2016, but did not go on to make his senior international debut.

On 5 November 2016, Shields featured for the Barbarians in their 31–31 draw against South Africa at Wembley Stadium. He played the entire 80 minutes in the number 6 jersey in a side containing his Hurricanes teammates, Reggie Goodes and Michael Fatialofa.

On 9 June 2018, he made his debut for England, coming on as a replacement in England's narrow defeat against South Africa at Ellis Park. He was then named as a starter for the second test against South Africa the following week.

Shields started once in the 2019 Six Nations Championship against Italy and featured twice more from the bench. Shields missed selection for the 2019 Rugby World Cup, having been ruled out of contention for the competition through injury. Uncapped player, Lewis Ludlam, was called in as a replacement for Shields during warmup fixtures. He has not featured in an international since.

=== International tries ===
As of 7 July 2019

Try	Opposing team	Location	Venue	Competition	Date	Result	Score
1	Italy	London, England	Twickenham Stadium	2019 Six Nations	9 March 2019	Win	57 – 14
2	Italy	London, England	Twickenham Stadium	2019 Six Nations	9 March 2019	Win	57 – 14

== Career honours ==
New Zealand Under-20

- IRB Junior World Championship – 2011

Hurricanes

- Super Rugby – 2016
- Super Rugby – 2026

== Super Rugby statistics ==
As of 24 January 2017

Season	Team	Games	Starts	Sub	Mins	Tries	Cons	Pens	Drops	Points	Yel	Red
2012	Hurricanes	13	3	10	457	0	0	0	0	0	0	0
2013	Hurricanes	16	13	3	992	3	0	0	0	15	0	0
2014	Hurricanes	6	2	4	233	1	0	0	0	5	0	0
2015	Hurricanes	18	15	3	1151	2	0	0	0	10	0	0
2016	Hurricanes	16	16	0	1140	2	0	0	0	10	0	0
Total		69	49	20	3973	8	0	0	0	40	0	0
