= Ita Vaea =

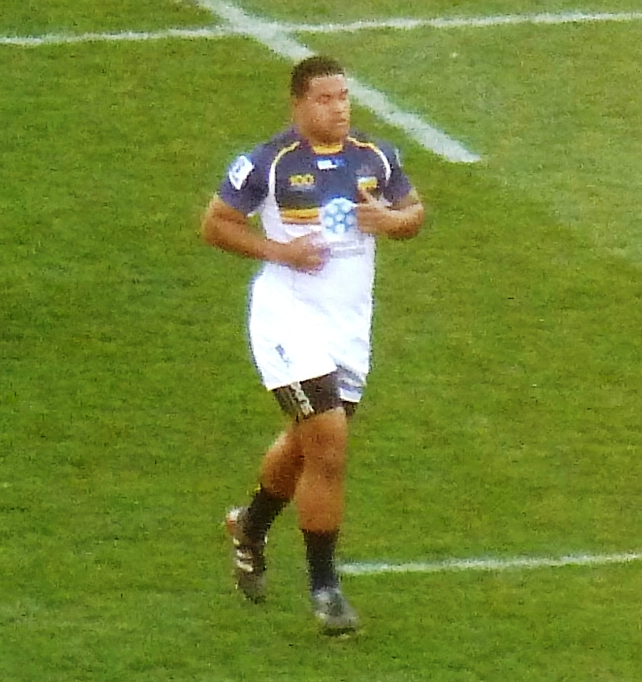
- Ita Vaea in 2013
- Born: Ita Vaea; 9 February 1989 (age 37) Tonga
- Height: 1.87 m (6 ft 1 1/2 in)
- Weight: 119 kg (18 st 10 lb)

Rugby union career
- Position: Number Eight
Senior career
Years	Team	Apps	(Points)
2014	NSW Country Eagles	5	(5)
2015	Canberra Vikings	9	(30)
- Correct as of 3 November 2015
Super Rugby
Years	Team	Apps	(Points)
2011–16	Brumbies	49	(35)
- Correct as of 22 June 2016

Ita Vaea (born 9 February 1989) is a former Tongan rugby union player who played for the Brumbies in Super Rugby. His playing position was number eight. He made his Brumbies debut during the 2011 Super Rugby season against the Sharks in Canberra.

Vaea made 26 appearances for the Brumbies during the 2011 and 2012 seasons and signed a contract extension in 2012 to keep him in Canberra until 2014, but was ruled out of the entire 2013 and 2014 Super Rugby season after a blood clot was discovered on his heart. He returned to action for the Brumbies during the 2015 Super Rugby season, scoring four tries in seventeen appearances and signed a contract tying him to the Brumbies until 2017. However, after starting four matches during the 2016 Super Rugby season, Vaea was forced to retire from rugby union following ongoing health issues relating to his heart.

Vaea attended Nelson College from 2006 to 2007.
