= 2015 Super Rugby season =

Men's rugby union club competition

- Countries: Australia; New Zealand; South Africa
- Tournament format(s): Round-robin and knockout
- Champions: Highlanders (1st title)
- Matches played: 125
- Tries scored: 633 (5.06 per match)
- Top point scorer(s): Lima Sopoaga (191)
- Top try scorer(s): Waisake Naholo (13)
- Official website: Official site

The 2015 Super Rugby season was the 20th season of Super Rugby and the fifth season featuring an expanded 15-team format. For sponsorship reasons, this competition was known as Asteron Life Super Rugby in Australia, Investec Super Rugby in New Zealand and Vodacom Super Rugby in South Africa. The round-robin matches took place every weekend from 13 February until 13 June, followed by the finals series and culminating in the final on 4 July. This was the final season that featured a 15-team format.

== Competition format ==
Covering 21 weeks, the schedule featured a total of 125 matches. The 15 teams were grouped geographically, labelled the Australian Conference, New Zealand Conference and the South African Conference. The regular season consisted of two types of matches:

- Internal Conference Matches – Each team played the other four teams in the same conference twice, home and away.
- Cross Conference Matches – Each team played four teams of the other two conferences away, and four teams of the other two conferences home, thus missing out on two teams (one from each of the other conferences). Each team played two home and two away games against teams from each of the other conferences, making a total of eight cross conference games for each team.

The top team of each conference, plus the next top three teams in table points regardless of conference (wild card teams), moved on to the finals. The top two conference winners, based on table points, received byes in the qualifier round. In the qualifier round, the third conference winner was the number three seed and hosted the wild card team with the worst record, and the best wild card team hosted the second-best wild card team. In the semi-finals, the number two conference winner hosted the higher surviving seed from the first round, and the number one conference winner hosted the other first-round winner. The final was hosted by the top remaining seed.

== Standings ==
=== Conference standings ===
Australian Conference
Pos	Team	Pts
1	Waratahs	52
2	Brumbies	47
3	Rebels	36
4	Reds	22
5	Force	19

New Zealand Conference
Pos	Team	Pts
1	Hurricanes	66
2	Highlanders	53
3	Chiefs	48
4	Crusaders	46
5	Blues	20

South African conference
Pos	Team	Pts
1	Stormers	45
2	Lions	42
3	Bulls	38
4	Sharks	34
5	Cheetahs	26

=== Overall standings ===
2015 Super Rugby standings
Pos	Team	Pld	W	D	L	PF	PA	PD	TF	TA	TB	LB	Pts	Qualification
1	Hurricanes	16	14	0	2	458	288	+170	58	31	9	1	66	Semi-finals
2	Waratahs	16	11	0	5	409	313	+96	50	41	5	3	52	Semi-finals
3	Stormers	16	10	1	5	373	323	+50	32	35	2	1	45	Qualifying finals
4	Highlanders (C)	16	11	0	5	450	333	+117	54	40	6	3	53	Qualifying finals
5	Chiefs	16	10	0	6	372	299	+73	40	27	4	4	48	Qualifying finals
6	Brumbies	16	9	0	7	369	261	+108	45	21	6	5	47	Qualifying finals
7	Crusaders	16	9	0	7	481	338	+143	56	39	8	2	46	
8	Lions	16	9	1	6	342	364	−22	33	41	2	2	42	
9	Bulls	16	7	0	9	397	388	+9	37	39	4	6	38	
10	Rebels	16	7	0	9	319	354	−35	35	42	3	5	36	
11	Sharks	16	7	0	9	338	401	−63	37	43	3	3	34	
12	Cheetahs	16	5	0	11	357	531	−174	44	65	4	2	26	
13	Reds	16	4	0	12	247	434	−187	32	53	3	3	22	
14	Blues	16	3	0	13	282	428	−146	29	50	2	6	20	
15	Force	16	3	0	13	245	384	−139	28	43	3	4	19	

Source: SANZAAR

=== Round-by-round ===
The table below shows each team's progression throughout the season. For each round, their cumulative points total is shown with the overall log position in brackets:

Team Progression
Team	R1	R2	R3	R4	R5	R6	R7	R8	R9	R10	R11	R12	R13	R14	R15	R16	R17	R18	Qual	SF	Final
Hurricanes	4 (3rd)	8 (2nd)	13 (1st)	13 (4th)	18 (2nd)	22 (1st)	27 (1st)	31 (1st)	31 (1st)	33 (1st)	38 (1st)	43 (1st)	48 (1st)	52 (1st)	57 (1st)	57 (1st)	62 (1st)	66 (1st)	Bye	Won	Lost
Waratahs	0 (12th)	5 (9th)	5 (10th)	9 (6th)	10 (8th)	14 (8th)	18 (6th)	18 (8th)	18 (10th)	23 (7th)	27 (7th)	31 (6th)	32 (7th)	36 (6th)	41 (2nd)	42 (3rd)	47 (2nd)	52 (2nd)	Bye	Lost	—N/a
Stormers	4 (5th)	8 (1st)	12 (2nd)	16 (1st)	16 (3rd)	16 (3rd)	16 (8th)	17 (9th)	22 (6th)	26 (6th)	30 (3rd)	30 (7th)	34 (2nd)	34 (7th)	38 (3rd)	43 (2nd)	45 (3rd)	45 (3rd)	Lost	—N/a	—N/a
Highlanders	0 (10th)	1 (12th)	5 (9th)	9 (7th)	14 (5th)	15 (6th)	20 (5th)	20 (5th)	24 (5th)	28 (5th)	28 (6th)	33 (5th)	34 (5th)	39 (5th)	43 (5th)	48 (4th)	48 (5th)	53 (4th)	Won	Won	Won
Chiefs	4 (7th)	8 (4th)	13 (4th)	14 (3rd)	18 (4th)	19 (4th)	24 (4th)	28 (4th)	28 (4th)	32 (4th)	37 (4th)	38 (4th)	38 (4th)	39 (4th)	44 (4th)	44 (5th)	48 (4th)	48 (5th)	Lost	—N/a	—N/a
Brumbies	5 (1st)	6 (3rd)	10 (3rd)	15 (2nd)	20 (1st)	20 (2nd)	20 (2nd)	24 (2nd)	25 (2nd)	26 (3rd)	31 (2nd)	32 (3rd)	33 (3rd)	38 (2nd)	38 (6th)	42 (6th)	47 (6th)	47 (6th)	Won	Lost	—N/a
Crusaders	0 (11th)	4 (10th)	4 (13th)	4 (14th)	9 (10th)	14 (7th)	14 (9th)	19 (6th)	20 (8th)	20 (10th)	25 (9th)	26 (9th)	31 (9th)	31 (9th)	31 (9th)	36 (8th)	41 (8th)	46 (7th)	—N/a	—N/a	—N/a
Lions	0 (14th)	0 (15th)	1 (15th)	5 (11th)	5 (13th)	9 (11th)	13 (10th)	17 (10th)	21 (7th)	21 (8th)	26 (8th)	27 (8th)	31 (8th)	31 (8th)	36 (7th)	40 (7th)	42 (7th)	42 (8th)	—N/a	—N/a	—N/a
Bulls	0 (13th)	1 (13th)	6 (8th)	10 (5th)	10 (7th)	14 (9th)	18 (7th)	19 (3rd)	24 (3rd)	28 (2nd)	29 (5th)	34 (2nd)	34 (6th)	35 (3rd)	35 (8th)	36 (9th)	37 (9th)	38 (9th)	—N/a	—N/a	—N/a
Rebels	4 (6th)	5 (7th)	6 (7th)	6 (9th)	10 (9th)	11 (10th)	11 (11th)	15 (11th)	15 (11th)	19 (11th)	20 (11th)	24 (10th)	29 (10th)	30 (10th)	30 (10th)	31 (10th)	35 (10th)	36 (10th)	—N/a	—N/a	—N/a
Sharks	1 (9th)	6 (5th)	6 (6th)	6 (10th)	11 (6th)	15 (5th)	19 (3rd)	19 (7th)	20 (9th)	21 (9th)	21 (10th)	21 (11th)	21 (11th)	21 (11th)	25 (11th)	29 (11th)	29 (11th)	34 (11th)	—N/a	—N/a	—N/a
Cheetahs	5 (2nd)	5 (6th)	9 (5th)	9 (8th)	9 (11th)	9 (12th)	9 (12th)	9 (12th)	13 (12th)	14 (12th)	16 (12th)	20 (12th)	20 (12th)	20 (12th)	20 (12th)	20 (13th)	21 (13th)	26 (12th)	—N/a	—N/a	—N/a
Reds	0 (15th)	4 (11th)	5 (12th)	5 (13th)	5 (14th)	5 (14th)	6 (14th)	6 (14th)	7 (15th)	11 (13th)	11 (13th)	11 (14th)	11 (15th)	16 (14th)	17 (14th)	22 (12th)	22 (12th)	22 (13th)	—N/a	—N/a	—N/a
Blues	1 (8th)	1 (14th)	2 (14th)	3 (15th)	4 (15th)	4 (15th)	4 (15th)	5 (15th)	9 (13th)	11 (14th)	11 (14th)	16 (13th)	16 (13th)	20 (13th)	20 (13th)	20 (14th)	20 (14th)	20 (14th)	—N/a	—N/a	—N/a
Force	5 (4th)	5 (8th)	5 (11th)	5 (12th)	6 (12th)	7 (13th)	8 (13th)	8 (13th)	8 (14th)	9 (15th)	10 (15th)	11 (15th)	15 (14th)	15 (15th)	15 (15th)	15 (15th)	15 (15th)	19 (15th)	—N/a	—N/a	—N/a
Key:	win	draw	loss	bye																	

== Matches ==
The following matches were played during the 2015 Super Rugby regular season:

=== Round 1 ===
13 February 2015	Crusaders	10–20	Rebels	AMI Stadium, Christchurch
19:35	Try: Ben Funnell 24'; Con: Dan Carter 25' (1/1); Pen: Dan Carter 10' (1/3); Colin Slade (0/1); Cards: Mitchell Drummond (yellow card) 40' to 50'	Report; Scoreboard	Try: Lopeti Timani 21'; Nic Stirzaker 66'; Con: Mike Harris 22', 67' (2/2); Pen: Mike Harris 33', 40' (2/3); Cards: Nic Stirzaker (yellow card) 3' to 14'; Sean McMahon (yellow card) 60' to 70'	Attendance: 13,518; Referee: Nick Briant

13 February 2015	Brumbies	47–3	Reds	GIO Stadium, Canberra
19:40	Try: Robbie Coleman 5'; Joe Tomane 40'; Matt To'omua 49'; Nic White 57'; Tevita Kuridrani 69'; James Dargaville 77'; Con: Christian Lealiifano 6', 50', 58', 70' (4/6); Pen: Christian Lealiifano 13', 25', 28' (3/3)	Report; Scoreboard	Pen: Karmichael Hunt 34' (1/2); Cards: James Horwill (yellow card) 48' to 59' (red card) 76'	Attendance: 13,570; Referee: Angus Gardner

13 February 2015	Lions	8–22	Hurricanes	Emirates Airline Park, Johannesburg
19:10	Try: Ruan Combrinck 23'; Con: Elton Jantjies (0/1); Pen: Marnitz Boshoff 40' (1/4); Drop: Marnitz Boshoff (0/1)	Report; Scoreboard	Try: TJ Perenara 36'; Matt Proctor 81'; Con: Beauden Barrett (0/2); Pen: Beauden Barrett 21', 28', 54', 75' (4/4)	Attendance: 17,251; Referee: Rohan Hoffmann

14 February 2015	Blues	18–23	Chiefs	QBE Stadium, Albany
19:35	Pen: Ihaia West 5', 29', 38', 45', 59', 71' (6/6)	Report; Scoreboard	Try: James Lowe 12'; Bryce Heem 15'; Con: Damian McKenzie 13', 16' (2/2); Pen: Damian McKenzie 20', 33', 47' (3/5); Cards: Matt Symons (yellow card) 44' to 54'	Attendance: 11,100; Referee: Chris Pollock

14 February 2015	Sharks	29–35	Cheetahs	Kings Park Stadium, Durban
17:05	Try: Patrick Lambie 25'; Lwazi Mvovo 75'; Con: Patrick Lambie 26', 76' (2/2); Pen: Patrick Lambie 11', 20', 40', 50', 56' (5/6)	Report; Scoreboard	Try: Jean Cook 13'; Francois Venter 27'; Boom Prinsloo 63'; Carl Wegner 69'; Con: Joe Pietersen 14', 28' (2/3); Willie du Plessis 70' (1/1); Pen: Joe Pietersen 23', 37', 44' (3/3); Drop: Joe Pietersen (0/1)	Attendance: 18,930; Referee: Andrew Lees

14 February 2015	Bulls	17–29	Stormers	Loftus Versfeld, Pretoria
19:10	Try: Deon Stegmann 4'; Con: Handré Pollard (0/1); Pen: Handré Pollard 43', 49', 54', 60' (4/6)	Report; Scoreboard	Try: Dillyn Leyds 8'; Duane Vermeulen 28'; Con: Demetri Catrakilis 9', 29' (2/2); Pen: Demetri Catrakilis 13', 52', 67' (3/5); Kurt Coleman 73' (1/1); Drop: Demetri Catrakilis (0/1); Kurt Coleman 78' (1/2)	Attendance: 37,047; Referee: Jaco Peyper

15 February 2015	Waratahs	13–25	Force	Allianz Stadium, Sydney
16:05	Try: Rob Horne 54', 77'; Con: Bernard Foley (0/2); Pen: Bernard Foley 24' (1/2); Cards: Wycliff Palu (yellow card) 34' to 42'	Report; Scoreboard	Try: Chris Alcock 36'; Angus Cottrell 46'; Luke Morahan 67'; Francois van Wyk 73'; Con: Sias Ebersohn 47' (1/3); Zack Holmes (0/1); Pen: Sias Ebersohn 12' (1/3); Drop: Sias Ebersohn (0/1); Cards: Alby Mathewson (yellow card) 54' to 65'	Attendance: 20,271; Referee: Steve Walsh

Bye/s: Highlanders

=== Round 2 ===
20 February 2015	Chiefs	19–17	Brumbies	Yarrow Stadium, New Plymouth
17:35	Try: Charlie Ngatai 15'; Con: Aaron Cruden 16' (1/1); Pen: Aaron Cruden 7', 33', 68', 80' (4/4)	Report; Scoreboard	Try: Ita Vaea 19'; Con: Christian Lealiifano (0/1); Pen: Christian Lealiifano 5', 44', 58' (3/3); Nic White 14' (1/2)	Attendance: 6,985; Referee: Steve Walsh

20 February 2015	Rebels	28–38	Waratahs	AAMI Park, Melbourne
19:40	Try: Scott Higginbotham 12'; Lopeti Timani 40'; Luke Burgess 53'; Sefa Naivalu 66'; Con: Mike Harris 13', 40', 54', 67' (4/4); Pen: Mike Harris (0/1); Jack Debreczeni (0/1)	Report; Scoreboard	Try: Stephen Hoiles 22'; Taqele Naiyaravoro 43', 61'; Kurtley Beale 73'; Con: Bernard Foley 23', 44', 74' (3/4); Pen: Bernard Foley 4', 33', 78' (3/3); Kurtley Beale 27' (1/1); Cards: Taqele Naiyaravoro (yellow card) 63' to 74'	Attendance: 12,178; Referee: Angus Gardner

20 February 2015	Bulls	13–17	Hurricanes	Loftus Versfeld, Pretoria
19:10	Try: Handré Pollard 31'; Con: Handré Pollard 32' (1/1); Pen: Handré Pollard 29', 52' (2/3)	Report; Scoreboard	Try: Julian Savea 67'; Con: Beauden Barrett (0/1); Pen: Beauden Barrett 12', 19', 40', 47' (4/6)	Attendance: 11,774; Referee: Andrew Lees

21 February 2015	Highlanders	20–26	Crusaders	Forsyth Barr Stadium, Dunedin
19:35	Try: Aaron Smith 20'; Malakai Fekitoa 62'; Con: Lima Sopoaga 21', 63' (2/2); Pen: Lima Sopoaga 73', 81' (2/3)	Report; Scoreboard	Try: Scott Barrett 27'; Johnny McNicholl 40'; Con: Colin Slade 28', 40' (2/2); Pen: Colin Slade 18', 35', 52', 79' (4/7)	Attendance: 17,005; Referee: Ben O'Keeffe

21 February 2015	Reds	18–6	Force	Suncorp Stadium, Brisbane
18:40	Try: Lachlan Turner 35' penalty try 55'; Con: Lachlan Turner 56' (1/2); Pen: Lachlan Turner 15', 18' (2/3)	Report; Scoreboard	Pen: Sias Ebersohn 21', 30' (2/2); Cards: Chris Heiberg (yellow card) 25' to 36'	Attendance: 14,199; Referee: Nick Briant

21 February 2015	Stormers	27–16	Blues	Newlands Stadium, Cape Town
17:05	Try: Nic Groom 11'; Dillyn Leyds 35'; Con: Demetri Catrakilis 36' (1/2); Pen: Demetri Catrakilis 6', 40', 42', 54' (4/5); Kurt Coleman 78' (1/2)	Report; Scoreboard	Try: Jimmy Cowan 51'; Con: Ihaia West 52' (1/1); Pen: Ihaia West 4', 8', 44' (3/3); Cards: Hayden Triggs (red card) 25'	Attendance: 27,352; Referee: Craig Joubert

21 February 2015	Sharks	29–12	Lions	Kings Park Stadium, Durban
19:10	Try: Odwa Ndungane 25'; Cobus Reinach 30'; Marcell Coetzee 64', 77'; Con: Patrick Lambie 31', 65', 78' (3/4); Pen: Patrick Lambie 9' (1/3)	Report; Scoreboard	Pen: Marnitz Boshoff 3', 33', 51', 58' (4/4); Ruan Combrinck (0/1); Cards: Warren Whiteley (yellow card) 76'	Attendance: 11,431; Referee: Rohan Hoffmann

Bye/s: Cheetahs

=== Round 3 ===
27 February 2015	Highlanders	20–13	Reds	Forsyth Barr Stadium, Dunedin
19:35	Try: Waisake Naholo 68'; Con: Hayden Parker (0/1); Pen: Marty Banks 3', 22', 24', 55' (4/5); Hayden Parker 78' (1/1)	Report; Scoreboard	Try: Jake Schatz 50'; Con: James O'Connor 51' (1/1); Pen: James O'Connor 11', 80' (2/3)	Referee: Glen Jackson

27 February 2015	Force	13–42	Hurricanes	nib Stadium, Perth
19:00	Try: Mitchell Scott 77'; Con: Luke Burton 78' (1/1); Pen: Zack Holmes 3' (1/2); Luke Burton 40' (1/2)	Report; Scoreboard	Try: Cory Jane 12'; Mark Abbott 25'; Victor Vito 61'; Julian Savea 64'; James Marshall 80'; Con: Beauden Barrett 26', 62' (2/3); James Marshall 65', 80' (2/2); Pen: Beauden Barrett 36', 44', 55' (3/3)	Attendance: 14,670; Referee: Marius van der Westhuizen

27 February 2015	Cheetahs	25–24	Blues	Free State Stadium, Bloemfontein
19:10	Try: Cornal Hendricks 19', 33'; Sarel Pretorius 54'; Con: Joe Pietersen 20', 55' (2/3); Pen: Joe Pietersen 71', 79' (2/3)	Report; Scoreboard	Try: Luke Braid 25'; Charlie Faumuina 37'; Jerome Kaino 64'; Con: Ihaia West 26', 38', 65' (3/3); Pen: Ihaia West 74' (1/2); Drop: Ihaia West (0/1)	Attendance: 13,282; Referee: Rohan Hoffmann

28 February 2015	Chiefs	40–16	Crusaders	Waikato Stadium, Hamilton
19:35	Try: Sonny Bill Williams 13'; Augustine Pulu 22'; Charlie Ngatai 33'; Tom Marshall 63'; James Lowe 67'; Con: Aaron Cruden 23', 34', 68' (3/5); Pen: Aaron Cruden 31', 49', 55' (3/4); Cards: James Lowe (yellow card) 8' to 20'; Damian McKenzie (yellow card) 78'	Report; Scoreboard	Try: Andrew Ellis 45'; Con: Colin Slade 46' (1/1); Pen: Colin Slade 3', 8', 26' (3/5); Cards: Matt Todd (yellow card) 21' to 31'	Attendance: 18,166; Referee: Mike Fraser

28 February 2015	Rebels	15–20	Brumbies	AAMI Park, Melbourne
19:40	Pen: Mike Harris 16', 40', 56', 63', 76' (5/6); Cards: Scott Higginbotham (yellow card) 58' to 68'	Report; Scoreboard	Try: Tevita Kuridrani 21'; Jarrad Butler 59'; Con: Christian Lealiifano 22', 60' (2/2); Pen: Christian Lealiifano 13', 30' (2/2); Nic White (0/1); Cards: Sam Carter (yellow card) 75'	Attendance: 9,071; Referee: Steve Walsh

28 February 2015	Bulls	43–35	Sharks	Loftus Versfeld, Pretoria
17:05	Try: Francois Hougaard 25'; Deon Stegmann 36'; Pierre Spies 44'; Jan Serfontein 80'; Con: Handré Pollard 26', 37', 45' (3/3); Tian Schoeman 81' (1/1); Pen: Handré Pollard 2', 9', 14', 60' (4/4); Tian Schoeman 75' (1/1)	Report; Scoreboard	Try: Ryan Kankowski 30'; Cobus Reinach 60'; Con: Patrick Lambie 31', 61' (2/2); Pen: Patrick Lambie 7', 23', 33', 43', 52', 67', 73' (7/7)	Attendance: 38,538; Referee: Jaco van Heerden

28 February 2015	Lions	19–22	Stormers	Emirates Airline Park, Johannesburg
19:10	Try: Warwick Tecklenburg 17'; Con: Elton Jantjies 18' (1/1); Pen: Elton Jantjies 5', 40', 42', 53' (4/4); Ruan Combrinck (0/1); Drop: Jaco van der Walt (0/1)	Report; Scoreboard	Try: Siya Kolisi 76'; Con: Kurt Coleman 77' (1/1); Pen: Demetri Catrakilis 28', 35', 38', 46', 66' (5/5)	Attendance: 20,107; Referee: Andrew Lees

Bye/s: Waratahs

=== Round 4 ===
6 March 2015	Chiefs	17–20	Highlanders	Waikato Stadium, Hamilton
19:35	Try: penalty try 48', 57'; Con: Aaron Cruden 49', 57' (2/2); Pen: Aaron Cruden 5' (1/4); Andrew Horrell (0/1); Cards: James Lowe (yellow card) 78'	Report; Scoreboard	Try: Patrick Osborne 35'; Con: Lima Sopoaga (0/1); Pen: Lima Sopoaga 20', 28', 40' (3/3); Marty Banks 77', 80' (2/2); Cards: Joe Wheeler (yellow card) 46' to 57'	Referee: Nick Briant

6 March 2015	Brumbies	27–15	Force	GIO Stadium, Canberra
19:40	Try: Rory Arnold 7'; Joe Tomane 13'; Ben Alexander 23'; Nic White 49'; Con: Christian Lealiifano 8', 24' (2/3); Nic White (0/1); Pen: Christian Lealiifano 63' (1/1)	Report; Scoreboard	Try: Nick Cummins 11'; Steve Mafi 57'; Con: Zack Holmes 58' (1/2); Pen: Zack Holmes 40' (1/2)	Attendance: 10,799; Referee: Marius van der Westhuizen

7 March 2015	Blues	10–13	Lions	QBE Stadium, Albany
19:35	Try: Jerome Kaino 30'; Con: Ihaia West 31' (1/1); Pen: Ihaia West 21' (1/2)	Report; Scoreboard	Try: Ruan Combrinck 63'; Con: Elton Jantjies 64' (1/1); Pen: Elton Jantjies 24', 50' (2/3); Ruan Combrinck (0/1)	Attendance: 6,420; Referee: Matt O'Brien

7 March 2015	Reds	5–23	Waratahs	Suncorp Stadium, Brisbane
18:40	Try: Marco Kotze 80'; Con: James O'Connor (0/1); Pen: James O'Connor (0/2)	Report; Scoreboard	Try: Bernard Foley 25'; Peter Betham 67'; Con: Bernard Foley 26', 68' (2/2); Pen: Bernard Foley 13', 23', 50' (3/4); Cards: Tatafu Polota-Nau (yellow card) 57' to 68'	Attendance: 27,199; Referee: Glen Jackson

7 March 2015	Cheetahs	20–39	Bulls	Free State Stadium, Bloemfontein
17:05	Try: Raymond Rhule 43'; Boom Prinsloo 59'; Con: Joe Pietersen 44', 60' (2/2); Pen: Joe Pietersen 4', 29' (2/2); Cards: Raymond Rhule (yellow card) 6' to 16'	Report; Scoreboard	Try: Handré Pollard 18'; Bjorn Basson 31'; Jan Serfontein 71'; Con: Handré Pollard 19', 32', 72' (3/3); Pen: Handré Pollard 11', 27', 40', 54', 62' (5/5); Drop: Handré Pollard 65' (1/1)	Attendance: 25,835; Referee: Stuart Berry

7 March 2015	Stormers	29–13	Sharks	Newlands Stadium, Cape Town
19:10	Try: Johnny Kôtze 18' penalty try 66'; Con: Demetri Catrakilis 19' (1/1); Kurt Coleman 67' (1/1); Pen: Demetri Catrakilis 33', 40', 45', 50' (4/4); Kurt Coleman 73' (1/1); Cards: Nic Groom (yellow card) 21' to 33'	Report; Scoreboard	Try: Patrick Lambie 24'; Con: Patrick Lambie 26' (1/1); Pen: Patrick Lambie 4', 65' (2/2); Cards: François Steyn (yellow card) 73'	Attendance: 40,232; Referee: Jaco Peyper

Bye/s: Crusaders, Hurricanes, Rebels

=== Round 5 ===
13 March 2015	Hurricanes	30–23	Blues	Central Energy Trust Arena, Palmerston North
17:35	Try: TJ Perenara 7'; Matt Proctor 40'; Julian Savea 49', 75'; Con: Beauden Barrett 40', 50' (2/4); Pen: Beauden Barrett 6', 17' (2/3); Drop: Conrad Smith (0/1)	Report; Scoreboard	Try: Lolagi Visinia 20'; Frank Halai 28'; Con: Ihaia West 21', 29' (2/2); Pen: Ihaia West 32', 47', 53' (3/5)	Attendance: 10,460; Referee: Glen Jackson

13 March 2015	Force	17–21	Rebels	nib Stadium, Perth
19:00	Try: Alby Mathewson 39'; Tetera Faulkner 74'; Con: Luke Burton 40', 75' (2/2); Pen: Luke Burton 48' (1/1)	Report; Scoreboard	Try: Mike Harris 4'; Dom Shipperley 22'; Con: Mike Harris 5' (1/2); Pen: Mike Harris 33', 60', 65' (3/3)	Attendance: 9,972; Referee: Rohan Hoffmann

14 March 2015	Crusaders	34–6	Lions	AMI Stadium, Christchurch
16:30	Try: Andrew Ellis 6' penalty try 56'; Kieron Fonotia 58'; Kieran Read 76'; Con: Dan Carter 7', 57', 59', 77' (4/4); Pen: Dan Carter 17', 24' (2/3)	Report; Scoreboard	Pen: Elton Jantjies 26', 46' (2/2); Cards: Julian Redelinghuys (yellow card) 50' to 60'	Attendance: 14,000; Referee: Nick Briant

14 March 2015	Highlanders	26–19	Waratahs	Forsyth Barr Stadium, Dunedin
19:35	Try: Tom Franklin 29'; Waisake Naholo 39'; Ben Smith 44'; Patrick Osborne 47'; Con: Lima Sopoaga 30', 40', 45' (3/4); Pen: Lima Sopoaga (0/2)	Report; Scoreboard	Try: Nick Phipps 3'; Matthew Carraro 19'; Stephen Hoiles 78'; Con: Bernard Foley 20', 79' (2/3); Cards: Sekope Kepu (yellow card) 28' to 38'	Attendance: 11,986; Referee: Craig Joubert

14 March 2015	Reds	0–29	Brumbies	Suncorp Stadium, Brisbane
18:40	Pen: Nick Frisby (0/1); Cards: Liam Gill (yellow card) 47' to 57'	Report; Scoreboard	Try: Stephen Moore 20'; Ben Alexander 27', 47'; Ita Vaea 57'; Christian Lealiifano 73'; Con: Christian Lealiifano 48', 74' (2/5); Pen: Christian Lealiifano (0/1)	Attendance: 22,537; Referee: Andrew Lees

14 March 2015	Stormers	19–28	Chiefs	Newlands Stadium, Cape Town
15:00	Try: Kobus van Wyk 19'; Con: Kurt Coleman 20' (1/1); Pen: Kurt Coleman 15', 23', 35' (3/4); Demetri Catrakilis 63' (1/1)	Report; Scoreboard	Try: Aaron Cruden 27'; James Lowe 48'; Sam Cane 71'; Con: Aaron Cruden 28', 49' (2/3); Pen: Aaron Cruden 5', 40', 60' (3/4)	Attendance: 42,247; Referee: Jaco Peyper

14 March 2015	Cheetahs	10–27	Sharks	Free State Stadium, Bloemfontein
17:05	Try: Francois Venter 79'; Con: Francois Brummer 80' (1/1); Pen: Willie du Plessis 7' (1/2)	Report; Scoreboard	Try: François Steyn 9'; Marcell Coetzee 29', 33'; Jack Wilson 74'; Con: Patrick Lambie 10', 34' (2/4); Pen: Patrick Lambie 26' (1/1); Cards: Ryan Kankowski (yellow card) 78'	Attendance: 16,583; Referee: Chris Pollock

Bye/s: Bulls

=== Round 6 ===
20 March 2015	Highlanders	13–20	Hurricanes	Forsyth Barr Stadium, Dunedin
19:35	Try: Lima Sopoaga 78'; Con: Lima Sopoaga 79' (1/1); Pen: Lima Sopoaga 9', 62' (2/4)	Report; Scoreboard	Try: Reggie Goodes 49'; TJ Perenara 73'; Con: Beauden Barrett 50', 74' (2/2); Pen: Beauden Barrett 36', 59' (2/4); Cards: Julian Savea (yellow card) 78'	Attendance: 17,300; Referee: Ben O'Keeffe

20 March 2015	Rebels	16–20	Lions	AAMI Park, Melbourne
19:40	Try: Mitch Inman 6'; Jonah Placid 12'; Con: Mike Harris (0/2); Pen: Mike Harris 3', 67' (2/3); Cards: Steve Cummins (yellow card) 60' to 71'	Report; Scoreboard	Try: Marnitz Boshoff 44'; Lionel Mapoe 77'; Con: Elton Jantjies 45', 78' (2/2); Pen: Elton Jantjies 32', 61' (2/2); Marnitz Boshoff (0/1); Cards: Franco Mostert (yellow card) 4' to 15'	Referee: Mike Fraser

21 March 2015	Crusaders	57–14	Cheetahs	AMI Stadium, Christchurch
19:35	Try: Jordan Taufua 19', 70' penalty try 51'; Israel Dagg 53'; Dan Carter 55', 78'; Nemani Nadolo 57'; David Havili 76'; Con: Dan Carter 20', 51', 54', 56', 58', 77', 79' (7/8); Pen: Dan Carter 40' (1/2); Cards: Kieron Fonotia (yellow card) 7' to 18'	Report; Scoreboard	Try: Francois Venter 29'; Johann Sadie 32'; Con: Joe Pietersen 30', 33' (2/2); Pen: Joe Pietersen (0/1); Cards: Willie le Roux (yellow card) 49' to 60'; Coenie Oosthuizen (yellow card) 69' to 79'	Referee: Andrew Lees

21 March 2015	Bulls	25–24	Force	Loftus Versfeld, Pretoria
17:05	Try: Marcel van der Merwe 51'; Con: Handré Pollard 52' (1/1); Pen: Handré Pollard 9', 15', 33', 63', 67', 80' (6/6)	Report; Scoreboard	Try: Adam Coleman 12'; Sam Wykes 44'; Kyle Godwin 72'; Con: Luke Burton 13', 45' (2/2); Sias Ebersohn 73' (1/1); Pen: Luke Burton (0/2); Sias Ebersohn 78' (1/1); Drop: Sias Ebersohn (0/1); Cards: Adam Coleman (yellow card) 47' to 58'; Tetera Faulkner (yellow card) 49' to 59'	Attendance: 14,282; Referee: Nick Briant

21 March 2015	Sharks	12–11	Chiefs	Kings Park Stadium, Durban
19:10	Pen: Patrick Lambie 3', 32', 40', 60' (4/6); Cards: Bismarck du Plessis (red card) 18'; François Steyn (red card) 28'	Report; Scoreboard	Try: Sam Cane 34'; Con: Aaron Cruden (0/1); Pen: Aaron Cruden 6', 29' (2/3); Drop: Aaron Cruden (0/1); Cards: Hika Elliot (red card) 15'	Attendance: 18,564; Referee: Angus Gardner

22 March 2015	Waratahs	28–13	Brumbies	Allianz Stadium, Sydney
16:05	Try: Bernard Foley 26'; Israel Folau 31'; Tolu Latu 73'; Con: Bernard Foley 27', 32' (2/3); Pen: Bernard Foley 11', 16' (2/2); Kurtley Beale 47' (1/1); Cards: Tolu Latu (yellow card) 79'	Report; Scoreboard	Try: Matt To'omua 3'; Con: Christian Lealiifano 4' (1/1); Pen: Christian Lealiifano 18', 23' (2/2); Cards: Scott Fardy (yellow card) 9' to 19'	Attendance: 27,469; Referee: Craig Joubert

Bye/s: Blues, Reds, Stormers

=== Round 7 ===
27 March 2015	Hurricanes	36–12	Rebels	Westpac Stadium, Wellington
19:35	Try: TJ Perenara 12'; Cory Jane 44'; Callum Gibbins 58'; Nehe Milner-Skudder 77', 80'; Con: Jason Woodward 13', 45', 59', 81' (4/5); Pen: Jason Woodward 39' (1/2); Cards: TJ Perenara (yellow card) 69' to 80'	Report; Scoreboard	Pen: Mike Harris 8', 27', 31', 40' (4/4)	Attendance: 13,528; Referee: Stuart Berry

27 March 2015	Reds	17–18	Lions	Suncorp Stadium, Brisbane
19:00	Try: penalty try 53'; Samu Kerevi 68'; Con: Quade Cooper 53', 69' (2/2); Pen: Quade Cooper 12' (1/2); Drop: Quade Cooper (0/1)	Report; Scoreboard	Try: Harold Vorster 14'; Warwick Tecklenburg 49'; Con: Elton Jantjies 50' (1/2); Pen: Elton Jantjies 40', 72' (2/2); Cards: Ruan Combrinck (yellow card) 51' to 62'	Attendance: 19,199; Referee: Glen Jackson

28 March 2015	Chiefs	37–27	Cheetahs	Waikato Stadium, Hamilton
16:30	Try: Michael Leitch 2'; Liam Messam 18'; Sam Cane 68'; Andrew Horrell 76'; Con: Aaron Cruden 3', 19', 69', 77' (4/4); Pen: Aaron Cruden 46', 53', 61' (3/3); Cards: Michael Fitzgerald (yellow card) 24' to 35'; Ben Tameifuna (yellow card) 32' to 41'	Report; Scoreboard	Try: Boom Prinsloo 28'; Heinrich Brüssow 54', 80'; Con: Joe Pietersen 29', 55' (2/2); Willie du Plessis 81' (1/1); Pen: Joe Pietersen 8', 11' (2/3); Cards: Heinrich Brüssow (yellow card) 66' to 76'	Attendance: 11,610; Referee: Craig Joubert

28 March 2015	Highlanders	39–21	Stormers	Forsyth Barr Stadium, Dunedin
19:35	Try: Aaron Smith 23'; Waisake Naholo 33', 40'; Patrick Osborne 48'; Dan Pryor 72'; Con: Lima Sopoaga 24', 34', 40', 49' (4/4); Marty Banks (0/1); Pen: Lima Sopoaga 32' (1/1); Marty Banks 80' (1/1); Cards: Aaron Smith (yellow card) 56' to 68'	Report; Scoreboard	Try: Juan de Jongh 19', 75'; Michael Rhodes 61'; Con: Demetri Catrakilis 20' (1/1); Kurt Coleman 62', 76' (2/2)	Referee: Rohan Hoffmann

28 March 2015	Waratahs	23–11	Blues	Allianz Stadium, Sydney
19:40	Try: Nick Phipps 8'; Peter Betham 75'; Con: Bernard Foley 9', 76' (2/2); Pen: Bernard Foley 58', 61', 68' (3/4); Kurtley Beale (0/1)	Report; Scoreboard	Try: Francis Saili 54'; Con: Daniel Bowden (0/1); Pen: Daniel Bowden 14', 24' (2/3); Cards: Jerome Kaino (yellow card) 72'	Attendance: 16,342; Referee: Jaco Peyper

28 March 2015	Sharks	15–9	Force	Kings Park Stadium, Durban
17:05	Try: SP Marais 43'; Lwazi Mvovo 68'; Con: François Steyn (0/1); Fred Zeilinga 69' (1/1); Pen: François Steyn (0/1); Fred Zeilinga 64' (1/2); Drop: François Steyn (0/1)	Report; Scoreboard	Pen: Sias Ebersohn 31', 39' (2/4); Luke Burton 80' (1/1)	Attendance: 16,023; Referee: Nick Briant

28 March 2015	Bulls	31–19	Crusaders	Loftus Versfeld, Pretoria
19:10	Try: Francois Hougaard 3'; Burger Odendaal 9'; Grant Hattingh 66'; Con: Handré Pollard 10', 67' (2/3); Pen: Handré Pollard 27', 38', 52', 56' (4/6); Drop: Handré Pollard (0/1)	Report; Scoreboard	Try: Nemani Nadolo 23'; Con: Dan Carter 24' (1/1); Pen: Dan Carter 14', 19', 33', 64' (4/4)	Attendance: 25,734; Referee: Angus Gardner

Bye/s: Brumbies

=== Round 8 ===
3 April 2015	Hurricanes	25–20	Stormers	Westpac Stadium, Wellington
19:35	Try: Nehe Milner-Skudder 26'; Julian Savea 36'; Beauden Barrett 39'; Con: Beauden Barrett 27', 40' (2/3); Pen: Beauden Barrett 10', 20' (2/2)	Report; Scoreboard	Try: penalty try 49'; Huw Jones 64'; Con: Demetri Catrakilis 50', 65' (2/2); Pen: Demetri Catrakilis 15' (1/1); Kurt Coleman 74' (1/1)	Attendance: 13,369; Referee: Rohan Hoffmann

3 April 2015	Rebels	23–15	Reds	AAMI Park, Melbourne
19:40	Try: Lopeti Timani 22'; Tom English 31'; Nic Stirzaker 66'; Con: Mike Harris 23' (1/3); Pen: Mike Harris 11', 71' (2/3)	Report; Scoreboard	Try: James Horwill 6'; Jake Schatz 13'; Con: Quade Cooper 7' (1/2); Pen: Quade Cooper 29' (1/3); Cards: James Horwill (red card) 20'	Referee: Matt O'Brien

4 April 2015	Chiefs	23–16	Blues	Waikato Stadium, Hamilton
19:35	Try: James Lowe 28'; Tom Marshall 68'; Con: Aaron Cruden 29', 69' (2/2); Pen: Aaron Cruden 18', 59', 75' (3/5)	Report; Scoreboard	Try: Jerome Kaino 47'; Con: Daniel Bowden 48' (1/1); Pen: Daniel Bowden 34', 54' (2/2); Ihaia West 81' (1/1)	Attendance: 14,248; Referee: Mike Fraser

4 April 2015	Brumbies	20–3	Cheetahs	GIO Stadium, Canberra
19:40	Try: Christian Lealiifano 4'; Blake Enever 45'; Con: Christian Lealiifano 5', 46' (2/2); Pen: Christian Lealiifano 20', 40' (2/2)	Report; Scoreboard	Pen: Joe Pietersen 17' (1/1)	Attendance: 10,855; Referee: Ben O'Keeffe

4 April 2015	Sharks	10–52	Crusaders	Kings Park Stadium, Durban
15:00	Try: Odwa Ndungane 55'; Con: Fred Zeilinga 56' (1/1); Pen: Patrick Lambie 18' (1/2); Cards: Jean Deysel (red card) 40'	Report; Scoreboard	Try: Andrew Ellis 3'; Israel Dagg 5'; Kieron Fonotia 22'; Ryan Crotty 35'; Colin Slade 43'; David Havili 47'; Matt Todd 52'; Tom Taylor 79'; Con: Colin Slade 4', 6', 23', 36', 44' (5/7); Tom Taylor 80' (1/1); Cards: Nepo Laulala (yellow card) 37' to 46'; Kieron Fonotia (yellow card) 38' to 47'; Nemani Nadolo (yellow card) 40' to 50'	Attendance: 25,969; Referee: Stuart Berry

4 April 2015	Lions	22–18	Bulls	Emirates Airline Park, Johannesburg
17:05	Try: Akker van der Merwe 80'; Con: Elton Jantjies 81' (1/1); Pen: Elton Jantjies 10', 16', 58', 62', 74' (5/7); Drop: Elton Jantjies (0/1)	Report; Scoreboard	Pen: Jacques-Louis Potgieter 27', 35', 38', 66', 70', 79' (6/8); Drop: Jacques-Louis Potgieter (0/1)	Attendance: 28,473; Referee: Jaco van Heerden

Bye/s: Force, Highlanders, Waratahs

=== Round 9 ===
10 April 2015	Blues	16–14	Brumbies	Eden Park, Auckland
19:35	Try: Daniel Bowden 35'; Con: Daniel Bowden 36' (1/1); Pen: Daniel Bowden 5', 18' (2/2); Ihaia West 78' (1/1)	Report; Scoreboard	Try: Lausii Taliauli 57'; Con: Christian Lealiifano (0/1); Pen: Christian Lealiifano 46', 68', 74' (3/4); Nic White (0/1)	Attendance: 10,000; Referee: Andrew Lees

11 April 2015	Crusaders	20–25	Highlanders	AMI Stadium, Christchurch
19:35	Try: Matt Todd 7'; Jordan Taufua 20'; Con: Israel Dagg 8' (1/1); Colin Slade 21' (1/1); Pen: Colin Slade 57', 78' (2/2)	Report; Scoreboard	Try: Ben Smith 39'; Waisake Naholo 45', 51'; Con: Lima Sopoaga 40', 52' (2/3); Pen: Lima Sopoaga 6', 24' (2/2); Aaron Smith (0/1); Cards: Lima Sopoaga (yellow card) 9' to 19'	Referee: Glen Jackson

11 April 2015	Waratahs	18–32	Stormers	Allianz Stadium, Sydney
19:40	Try: Taqele Naiyaravoro 13'; Rob Horne 40'; Con: Bernard Foley 40' (1/2); Pen: Bernard Foley 35', 58' (2/4)	Report; Scoreboard	Try: Damian de Allende 21', 71'; Kobus van Wyk 47'; Cheslin Kolbe 77'; Con: Demetri Catrakilis 22' (1/1); Kurt Coleman 48', 72' (2/3); Pen: Demetri Catrakilis 7', 17' (2/2); Kurt Coleman (0/2); Drop: Demetri Catrakilis (0/1)	Attendance: 17,353; Referee: Mike Fraser

11 April 2015	Force	15–24	Cheetahs	nib Stadium, Perth
19:45	Try: Luke Morahan 14'; Chris Alcock 43'; Con: Luke Burton 15' (1/2); Pen: Luke Burton 39' (1/1); Sias Ebersohn (0/1)	Report; Scoreboard	Try: Raymond Rhule 6'; Heinrich Brüssow 67'; Con: Joe Pietersen 68' (1/2); Pen: Joe Pietersen 37', 47', 77' (3/3); Drop: Joe Pietersen 49' (1/1)	Attendance: 9,710; Referee: Rohan Hoffmann

11 April 2015	Lions	23–21	Sharks	Emirates Airline Park, Johannesburg
17:05	Try: Howard Mnisi 39'; Faf de Klerk 44'; Harold Vorster 47'; Con: Elton Jantjies 45' (1/3); Pen: Elton Jantjies 10', 19' (2/4)	Report; Scoreboard	Try: Renaldo Bothma 21'; Lwazi Mvovo 32'; Thomas du Toit 78'; Con: Fred Zeilinga 22', 33', 79' (3/3); Pen: Fred Zeilinga (0/3); Cards: André Esterhuizen (yellow card) 59' to 70'	Attendance: 37,184; Referee: Stuart Berry

11 April 2015	Bulls	43–22	Reds	Loftus Versfeld, Pretoria
19:10	Try: Burger Odendaal 60'; Piet van Zyl 69'; Francois Hougaard 8', 35'; Pierre Spies 18'; Marcel van der Merwe 53'; Con: Tian Schoeman 61', 70' (2/3); Jacques-Louis Potgieter 9', 19', 36' (3/3); Pen: Jacques-Louis Potgieter 5' (1/1)	Report; Scoreboard	Try: Lachlan Turner 16'; Will Genia 46'; Nick Frisby 49'; Marco Kotze 57'; Con: Lachlan Turner 47' (1/4); Cards: Adam Thomson (yellow card) 52' to 64'	Attendance: 15,393; Referee: Jaco Peyper

Bye/s: Chiefs, Hurricanes, Rebels

=== Round 10 ===
17 April 2015	Crusaders	9–26	Chiefs	AMI Stadium, Christchurch
19:35	Pen: Dan Carter 7', 37', 43' (3/6)	Report; Scoreboard	Try: Michael Leitch 21'; James Lowe 40'; Liam Squire 71'; Con: Andrew Horrell 22' (1/3); Pen: Aaron Cruden 10' (1/1); Tim Nanai-Williams 19' (1/1); Andrew Horrell 59' (1/2); Cards: Sam Cane (yellow card) 6' to 17'	Attendance: 14,500; Referee: Nick Briant

18 April 2015	Hurricanes	24–29	Waratahs	Westpac Stadium, Wellington
16:30	Try: Conrad Smith 21'; Beauden Barrett 23'; Brad Shields 38'; TJ Perenara 70'; Con: Beauden Barrett 22', 24' (2/4)	Report; Scoreboard	Try: Peter Betham 14', 40'; Will Skelton 34'; Israel Folau 52'; Con: Bernard Foley 15', 40', 53' (3/4); Pen: Bernard Foley 58' (1/2)	Attendance: 15,327; Referee: Glen Jackson

18 April 2015	Highlanders	30–24	Blues	Forsyth Barr Stadium, Dunedin
19:35	Try: Malakai Fekitoa 11', 38'; Waisake Naholo 17'; Con: Lima Sopoaga 12', 18', 39' (3/3); Pen: Lima Sopoaga 3', 45', 65' (3/3); Cards: Joe Wheeler (yellow card) 56' to 67'	Report; Scoreboard	Try: George Moala 42'; Patrick Tuipulotu 50'; Keven Mealamu 57', 77'; Con: Daniel Bowden 58' (1/3); Ihaia West 78' (1/1); Pen: Daniel Bowden (0/1)	Referee: Chris Pollock

18 April 2015	Brumbies	8–13	Rebels	GIO Stadium, Canberra
19:40	Try: Henry Speight 40'; Con: Christian Lealiifano (0/1); Pen: Christian Lealiifano 63' (1/1)	Report; Scoreboard	Try: Sefa Naivalu 12'; Con: Mike Harris 13' (1/1); Pen: Mike Harris 10', 26' (2/4); Jack Debreczeni (0/1)	Attendance: 7,531; Referee: Angus Gardner

18 April 2015	Force	6–13	Stormers	nib Stadium, Perth
19:45	Pen: Luke Burton 5', 38' (2/3); Cards: Luke Burton (yellow card) 75'	Report; Scoreboard	Try: penalty try 9'; Con: Demetri Catrakilis 10' (1/1); Pen: Demetri Catrakilis 3' (1/1); Kurt Coleman 76' (1/1)	Attendance: 10,823; Referee: Mike Fraser

18 April 2015	Sharks	10–17	Bulls	Kings Park Stadium, Durban
17:05	Try: Marcell Coetzee 42'; Con: Fred Zeilinga 43' (1/1); Pen: Fred Zeilinga 18' (1/3); Lionel Cronjé (0/1)	Report; Scoreboard	Try: Francois Hougaard 35'; Con: Handré Pollard (0/1); Pen: Handré Pollard 29', 45', 67', 74' (4/5); Drop: Handré Pollard (0/1)	Attendance: 23,623; Referee: Jaco Peyper

18 April 2015	Cheetahs	17–18	Reds	Free State Stadium, Bloemfontein
19:10	Try: Rayno Benjamin 32'; Boom Prinsloo 57'; Con: Joe Pietersen 33', 58' (2/2); Pen: Joe Pietersen 4' (1/2)	Report; Scoreboard	Try: Adam Korczyk 43'; Samu Kerevi 52'; Con: James O'Connor 44' (1/2); Pen: James O'Connor 40' (1/2); Drop: Nick Frisby 74' (1/1)	Attendance: 14,373; Referee: Jaco van Heerden

Bye/s: Lions

=== Round 11 ===
24 April 2015	Chiefs	35–27	Force	Waikato Stadium, Hamilton
19:35	Try: Charlie Ngatai 19'; Hika Elliot 39' penalty try 46'; Tim Nanai-Williams 66'; Con: Marty McKenzie 20', 40', 47' (3/4); Pen: Marty McKenzie 7', 18', 24' (3/3)	Report; Scoreboard	Try: Angus Cottrell 15'; Luke Morahan 56'; Matt Hodgson 62'; Heath Tessmann 77'; Con: Luke Burton 57', 63' (2/4); Pen: Luke Burton 10' (1/1); Cards: Ian Prior (red card) 28'	Attendance: 13,948; Referee: Angus Gardner

24 April 2015	Brumbies	31–18	Highlanders	GIO Stadium, Canberra
19:55	Try: Henry Speight 5'; David Pocock 14', 28', 35'; Con: Christian Lealiifano 6', 15', 29', 36' (4/4); Pen: Christian Lealiifano 9' (1/2)	Report; Scoreboard	Try: Shaun Treeby 44'; Dan Pryor 57'; Con: Lima Sopoaga 45' (1/2); Pen: Lima Sopoaga 18', 23' (2/2)	Attendance: 10,138; Referee: Matt O'Brien

25 April 2015	Crusaders	29–15	Blues	AMI Stadium, Christchurch
19:35	Try: Mitchell Drummond 3'; Jordan Taufua 16'; Tom Taylor 42'; Codie Taylor 58'; Con: Colin Slade 4', 17', 43' (3/4); Pen: Colin Slade 40' (1/1)	Report; Scoreboard	Try: Francis Saili 32'; Brendon O'Connor 65'; Con: Daniel Bowden 33' (1/2); Pen: Daniel Bowden 22' (1/1); Cards: Jamison Gibson-Park (yellow card) 53' to 64'	Referee: Chris Pollock

25 April 2015	Waratahs	18–16	Rebels	ANZ Stadium, Sydney
19:55	Try: Michael Hooper 9'; Adam Ashley-Cooper 20'; Rob Horne 60'; Con: Bernard Foley (0/3); Pen: Bernard Foley 16' (1/2)	Report; Scoreboard	Try: Bryce Hegarty 74'; Con: Jack Debreczeni 75' (1/1); Pen: Jack Debreczeni 40', 50', 58' (3/3); Cards: Sefa Naivalu (yellow card) 27' to 37'	Attendance: 15,807; Referee: Rohan Hoffmann

25 April 2015	Lions	34–29	Cheetahs	Emirates Airline Park, Johannesburg
17:05	Try: Warwick Tecklenburg 3'; Ruan Combrinck 42'; Lionel Mapoe 43'; Faf de Klerk 74'; Con: Elton Jantjies 4', 43', 44', 75' (4/4); Pen: Ruan Combrinck (0/1); Elton Jantjies 48', 71' (2/2)	Report; Scoreboard	Try: Cornal Hendricks 24'; Francois Venter 58'; Johann Sadie 61'; Carel Greeff 77'; Con: Joe Pietersen 25', 59', 62' (3/4); Drop: Joe Pietersen 38' (1/2)	Attendance: 19,437; Referee: Jaco van Heerden

25 April 2015	Stormers	15–13	Bulls	Newlands Stadium, Cape Town
19:10	Pen: Demetri Catrakilis 6', 13', 20', 40', 46' (5/5)	Report; Scoreboard	Try: Bjorn Basson 42'; Con: Handré Pollard 43' (1/1); Pen: Handré Pollard 25', 55' (2/3)	Attendance: 45,872; Referee: Jaco Peyper

26 April 2015	Reds	19–35	Hurricanes	Suncorp Stadium, Brisbane
16:05	Try: Samu Kerevi 14', 21'; Liam Gill 46'; Con: James O'Connor 22', 47' (2/3); Cards: Liam Gill (yellow card) 57' to 67'	Report; Scoreboard	Try: TJ Perenara 34', 67'; Callum Gibbins 37'; Julian Savea 63'; Con: Beauden Barrett 35', 38', 68' (3/4); Pen: Beauden Barrett 3', 28', 42' (3/5)	Attendance: 26,374; Referee: Nick Briant

Bye/s: Sharks

=== Round 12 ===
1 May 2015	Highlanders	48–15	Sharks	Forsyth Barr Stadium, Dunedin
19:35	Try: Gareth Evans 4'; Waisake Naholo 35'; Patrick Osborne 38'; Mark Reddish 56'; Aaron Smith 59'; Brendon Edmonds 66'; Elliot Dixon 78'; Con: Lima Sopoaga 5', 36', 39', 57', 67' (5/6); Marty Banks (0/1); Pen: Lima Sopoaga 21' (1/1)	Report; Scoreboard	Try: Tendai Mtawarira 32'; Bismarck du Plessis 71'; Con: Fred Zeilinga 33' (1/1); Lionel Cronjé (0/1); Pen: Fred Zeilinga 25' (1/1)	Referee: Angus Gardner

1 May 2015	Brumbies	10–13	Waratahs	GIO Stadium, Canberra
19:40	Try: Joe Tomane 8'; Con: Christian Lealiifano 9' (1/1); Pen: Christian Lealiifano 28' (1/2)	Report; Scoreboard	Try: Adam Ashley-Cooper 14'; Con: Bernard Foley 15' (1/1); Pen: Kurtley Beale 48' (1/1); Bernard Foley 58' (1/2); Cards: Rob Horne (yellow card) 65' to 75'	Attendance: 17,563; Referee: Glen Jackson

2 May 2015	Blues	41–24	Force	Eden Park, Auckland
17:30	Try: Melani Nanai 23', 43'; Steven Luatua 40'; Akira Ioane 49'; Ihaia West 67'; Con: Daniel Bowden 24', 40' (2/2); Lolagi Visinia 44' (1/1); Ihaia West 50', 68' (2/2); Pen: Daniel Bowden 3' (1/2); Ihaia West 63' (1/1)	Report; Scoreboard	Try: Pekahou Cowan 52'; Matt Hodgson 59'; Ryan Louwrens 70'; Ben McCalman 78'; Con: Luke Burton 53' (1/1); Sias Ebersohn 71' (1/3); Pen: Luke Burton (0/1); Cards: Dane Haylett-Petty (yellow card) 38' to 47'	Attendance: 10,400; Referee: Ben O'Keeffe

2 May 2015	Hurricanes	29–23	Crusaders	Westpac Stadium, Wellington
19:35	Try: Beauden Barrett 9'; Brad Shields 12'; Reggie Goodes 55'; Blade Thomson 62'; Con: Beauden Barrett 10', 13', 56' (3/4); Pen: Beauden Barrett 40' (1/1); James Marshall (0/1); Cards: Ma'a Nonu (yellow card) 29' to 39'	Report; Scoreboard	Try: Dan Carter 2'; Colin Slade 32'; Con: Colin Slade 3', 33' (2/2); Pen: Colin Slade 30', 47', 59' (3/5)	Attendance: 15,590; Referee: Mike Fraser

2 May 2015	Rebels	16–15	Chiefs	AAMI Park, Melbourne
19:40	Try: Scott Higginbotham 18'; Nic Stirzaker 39'; Con: Jack Debreczeni (0/2); Pen: Jack Debreczeni 6', 35' (2/2); Bryce Hegarty (0/2)	Report; Scoreboard	Try: Charlie Ngatai 58'; Michael Leitch 69'; Con: Damian McKenzie 59' (1/2); Pen: Andrew Horrell 23' (1/2); Cards: James Lowe (yellow card) 34' to 45'; Liam Messam (yellow card) 75'	Attendance: 13,023; Referee: Andrew Lees

2 May 2015	Cheetahs	25–17	Stormers	Free State Stadium, Bloemfontein
17:05	Try: Michael van der Spuy 21'; Rayno Benjamin 25'; Clayton Blommetjies 70'; Con: Joe Pietersen 22', 71' (2/3); Pen: Joe Pietersen 2', 18' (2/3); Drop: Joe Pietersen (0/1)	Report; Scoreboard	Try: Dillyn Leyds 28'; Duane Vermeulen 56'; Con: Demetri Catrakilis 29' (1/1); Kurt Coleman 57' (1/1); Pen: Demetri Catrakilis 15' (1/1); Kurt Coleman (0/4)	Attendance: 21,283; Referee: Craig Joubert

2 May 2015	Bulls	35–33	Lions	Loftus Versfeld, Pretoria
19:10	Try: Piet van Zyl 6', 9'; JJ Engelbrecht 29'; Pierre Spies 67'; Con: Handré Pollard 10', 30', 68' (3/4); Pen: Handré Pollard 18', 22', 75' (3/3); Drop: Handré Pollard (0/1)	Report; Scoreboard	Try: Faf de Klerk 13'; Jacques van Rooyen 54'; Jaco Kriel 78'; Con: Elton Jantjies 14', 55', 79' (3/3); Pen: Elton Jantjies 27', 39', 45', 52' (4/5); Drop: Marnitz Boshoff (0/1)	Attendance: 37,946; Referee: Marius van der Westhuizen

Bye/s: Reds

=== Round 13 ===
8 May 2015	Crusaders	58–17	Reds	AMI Stadium, Christchurch
19:35	Try: Andrew Ellis 2'; Colin Slade 18'; Nemani Nadolo 41', 53'; Sam Whitelock 55'; Matt Todd 58'; Jone Macilai-Tori 63'; Dominic Bird 70'; Con: Colin Slade 3', 42', 54', 56', 59', 71' (6/8); Pen: Colin Slade 31', 50' (2/2); Cards: Dominic Bird (yellow card) 35' to 45'	Report; Scoreboard	Try: Samu Kerevi 40'; Chris Feauai-Sautia 79'; Con: James O'Connor 40', 80' (2/2); Pen: James O'Connor 5' (1/2)	Attendance: 14,000; Referee: Mike Fraser

8 May 2015	Rebels	42–22	Blues	AAMI Park, Melbourne
19:40	Try: Colby Fainga'a 11'; Toby Smith 37'; Scott Higginbotham 52'; Dom Shipperley 69'; Jack Debreczeni 79'; Con: Mike Harris 38', 53', 70', 80' (4/5); Pen: Mike Harris 5', 33', 57' (3/3)	Report; Scoreboard	Try: Melani Nanai 28'; Jamison Gibson-Park 49'; George Moala 67'; Con: Ihaia West 29', 50' (2/3); Pen: Ihaia West 40' (1/1)	Attendance: 8,913; Referee: Angus Gardner

9 May 2015	Hurricanes	32–24	Sharks	Westpac Stadium, Wellington
19:35	Try: Cory Jane 12'; Conrad Smith 20'; Reggie Goodes 53'; Jeremy Thrush 73'; Con: James Marshall 13', 21', 54' (3/4); Pen: James Marshall 77', 80' (2/4)	Report; Scoreboard	Try: Bismarck du Plessis 6'; S'bura Sithole 47'; Odwa Ndungane 65'; Con: François Steyn 7', 48', 66' (3/3); Pen: François Steyn 18' (1/2); Cards: Etienne Oosthuizen (yellow card) 22' to 32'	Attendance: 9,227; Referee: Chris Pollock

9 May 2015	Force	18–11	Waratahs	nib Stadium, Perth
17:40	Try: Ryan Louwrens 19'; Matt Hodgson 63'; Con: Luke Burton 20' (1/2); Pen: Marcel Brache (0/1); Luke Burton 31', 40' (2/4); Sias Ebersohn (0/2); Cards: Matt Hodgson (yellow card) 70'	Report; Scoreboard	Try: Taqele Naiyaravoro 52'; Con: Bernard Foley (0/1); Pen: Bernard Foley 24', 27' (2/3); Kurtley Beale (0/1); Cards: Sekope Kepu (yellow card) 33' to 43'	Attendance: 10,115; Referee: Rohan Hoffmann

9 May 2015	Lions	28–23	Highlanders	Emirates Airline Park, Johannesburg
15:00	Try: Courtnall Skosan 46'; Jaco Kriel 56'; Harold Vorster 62'; Con: Elton Jantjies 47', 57' (2/3); Pen: Marnitz Boshoff 7' (1/2); Elton Jantjies 70', 77' (2/2)	Report; Scoreboard	Try: Gareth Evans 35'; Malakai Fekitoa 40'; Con: Lima Sopoaga 36', 40' (2/2); Pen: Lima Sopoaga 23' (1/2); Drop: Lima Sopoaga 30' (1/1); Ben Smith 52' (1/1)	Attendance: 15,160; Referee: Craig Joubert

9 May 2015	Stormers	25–24	Brumbies	Newlands Stadium, Cape Town
17:05	Try: Schalk Burger 61'; Con: Demetri Catrakilis 62' (1/1); Pen: Demetri Catrakilis 7', 39', 40', 44', 50' (5/6); Drop: Demetri Catrakilis 66' (1/1)	Report; Scoreboard	Try: Joe Tomane 14'; David Pocock 70'; Con: Christian Lealiifano 15' (1/2); Pen: Christian Lealiifano 3', 9', 65' (3/3); Jesse Mogg 30' (1/1); Cards: Jordan Smiler (yellow card) 54' to 65'	Attendance: 29,827; Referee: Stuart Berry

Bye/s: Bulls, Cheetahs, Chiefs

=== Round 14 ===
15 May 2015	Blues	23–18	Bulls	Eden Park, Auckland
19:35	Try: Lolagi Visinia 19'; George Moala 68'; Con: Ihaia West 20', 69' (2/2); Pen: Ihaia West 10', 36', 39' (3/3); Drop: Ihaia West (0/1)	Report; Scoreboard	Try: Jan Serfontein 32', 53'; Con: Handré Pollard 33' (1/2); Pen: Handré Pollard 8', 18' (2/2)	Attendance: 8,100; Referee: Mike Fraser

15 May 2015	Reds	46–29	Rebels	Suncorp Stadium, Brisbane
19:40	Try: Rob Simmons 36'; Jake McIntyre 45'; Lachlan Turner 50', 63'; Chris Feauai-Sautia 55'; Liam Gill 68'; Con: James O'Connor 46', 51', 56', 64', 69' (5/6); Pen: James O'Connor 21', 30' (2/2)	Report; Scoreboard	Try: Sefa Naivalu 5', 32'; Dom Shipperley 72'; Luke Jones 76'; Con: Mike Harris 6', 33', 77' (3/4); Pen: Mike Harris 27' (1/2); Cards: Jack Debreczeni (yellow card) 54' to 65'	Attendance: 17,993; Referee: Andrew Lees

16 May 2015	Hurricanes	22–18	Chiefs	Westpac Stadium, Wellington
19:35	Try: Ma'a Nonu 10', 68'; Ardie Savea 46'; Con: James Marshall 11', 69' (2/3); Pen: James Marshall 38' (1/1)	Report; Scoreboard	Try: Charlie Ngatai 40'; Sam Cane 75'; Con: Damian McKenzie 40' (1/2); Pen: Damian McKenzie 13', 24' (2/3); Cards: Liam Squire (yellow card) 49' to 59'	Attendance: 17,770; Referee: Glen Jackson

16 May 2015	Waratahs	33–18	Sharks	Allianz Stadium, Sydney
19:40	Try: Adam Ashley-Cooper 1'; Taqele Naiyaravoro 53'; Bernard Foley 79'; Con: Bernard Foley 2', 54', 80' (3/3); Pen: Bernard Foley 21', 29', 63', 70' (4/4)	Report; Scoreboard	Try: Odwa Ndungane 49'; François Steyn 58'; Con: François Steyn 59' (1/2); Pen: François Steyn 18', 36' (2/2)	Attendance: 18,578; Referee: Rohan Hoffmann

16 May 2015	Lions	20–30	Brumbies	Emirates Airline Park, Johannesburg
17:05	Try: Jaco Kriel 65'; Andries Coetzee 79'; Con: Elton Jantjies 66' (1/1); Jaco van der Walt 79' (1/1); Pen: Elton Jantjies 7' (1/2); Ruan Combrinck 13' (1/1)	Report; Scoreboard	Try: Tevita Kuridrani 18'; Ita Vaea 21'; Christian Lealiifano 26'; Joe Tomane 72'; Con: Christian Lealiifano 22', 27' (2/4); Pen: Jesse Mogg 76' (1/3); Christian Lealiifano 16' (1/2)	Attendance: 20,326; Referee: Jaco Peyper

16 May 2015	Cheetahs	24–45	Highlanders	Free State Stadium, Bloemfontein
19:10	Try: Rayno Benjamin 65'; Carl Wegner 68'; Francois Venter 72'; Con: Francois Brummer 66', 69', 72' (3/3); Pen: Francois Brummer 15' (1/1); Cards: Raymond Rhule (yellow card) 43' to 53'	Report; Scoreboard	Try: Ryan Tongia 4', 17'; Aaron Smith 25', 45'; Patrick Osborne 30'; Gareth Evans 47'; Ben Smith 74'; Con: Lima Sopoaga 5', 18', 31', 46' (4/6); Marty Banks 75' (1/1); Pen: Lima Sopoaga (0/1)	Attendance: 11,431; Referee: Stuart Berry

Bye/s: Crusaders, Force, Stormers

=== Round 15 ===
22 May 2015	Chiefs	34–20	Bulls	Rotorua International Stadium, Rotorua
19:35	Try: Liam Messam 23'; Bryce Heem 28'; Augustine Pulu 54', 56'; Tim Nanai-Williams 80'; Con: Damian McKenzie 24', 55', 57' (3/5); Pen: Damian McKenzie 6' (1/2); Cards: Sam Cane (yellow card) 69' to 79'	Report; Scoreboard	Try: Jan Serfontein 9'; Bjorn Basson 13'; Lappies Labuschagné 73'; Con: Handré Pollard 14' (1/3); Pen: Handré Pollard 16' (1/2)	Attendance: 13,714; Referee: Chris Pollock

22 May 2015	Reds	14–21	Sharks	Suncorp Stadium, Brisbane
19:40	Try: Chris Kuridrani 24'; Samu Kerevi 51'; Con: James O'Connor 25', 52' (2/2)	Report; Scoreboard	Try: Stefan Ungerer 17', 69'; Con: François Steyn 18' (1/1); Lionel Cronjé (0/1); Pen: François Steyn 7', 29', 39' (3/3); Drop: François Steyn (0/1)	Attendance: 20,899; Referee: Angus Gardner

23 May 2015	Blues	5–29	Hurricanes	Eden Park, Auckland
19:35	Try: Matt Vaega 64'; Con: Simon Hickey (0/1)	Report; Scoreboard	Try: Chris Eves 35'; TJ Perenara 39'; Dane Coles 55'; Nehe Milner-Skudder 67'; Con: Otere Black 36', 40', 56' (3/4); Pen: Otere Black 11' (1/1)	Attendance: 10,100; Referee: Nick Briant

23 May 2015	Waratahs	32–22	Crusaders	ANZ Stadium, Sydney
19:40	Try: Taqele Naiyaravoro 7', 52'; Rob Horne 24'; Bernard Foley 77'; Con: Bernard Foley 8', 25', 78' (3/4); Pen: Kurtley Beale (0/1); Bernard Foley 21', 44' (2/3); Cards: Tolu Latu (yellow card) 18' to 30'	Report; Scoreboard	Try: Nemani Nadolo 2'; Richie McCaw 56'; Matt Todd 66'; Con: Dan Carter 57', 67' (2/3); Pen: Dan Carter 12' (1/1); Cards: Richie McCaw (yellow card) 71'	Attendance: 26,971; Referee: Marius van der Westhuizen

23 May 2015	Force	3–23	Highlanders	nib Stadium, Perth
19:45	Pen: Sias Ebersohn 23' (1/1)	Report; Scoreboard	Try: John Hardie 46'; Aaron Smith 74'; Con: Lima Sopoaga 47' (1/1); Marty Banks 75' (1/1); Pen: Lima Sopoaga 17', 40' (2/3); Drop: Lima Sopoaga 72' (1/1)	Attendance: 13,554; Referee: Andrew Lees

23 May 2015	Cheetahs	17–40	Lions	Free State Stadium, Bloemfontein
17:05	Try: Boom Prinsloo 51', 71'; Con: Coenie van Wyk 52', 72' (2/2); Pen: Francois Brummer 7' (1/1)	Report; Scoreboard	Try: Jaco Kriel 26'; Lionel Mapoe 40'; Courtnall Skosan 44'; Faf de Klerk 66'; Con: Elton Jantjies 27', 40', 45', 67' (4/4); Pen: Elton Jantjies 10', 16', 36', 56' (4/4); Cards: Robbie Coetzee (yellow card) 49' to 60'	Attendance: 14,721; Referee: Jaco van Heerden

23 May 2015	Stormers	31–15	Rebels	Newlands Stadium, Cape Town
19:10	Try: Damian de Allende 24'; Dillyn Leyds 40', 46'; Con: Demetri Catrakilis 25', 47' (2/3); Pen: Demetri Catrakilis 5', 33', 44', 66' (4/4)	Report; Scoreboard	Try: Dom Shipperley 28'; Tom English 56'; Con: Mike Harris 29' (1/1); Jack Debreczeni (0/1); Pen: Jack Debreczeni 42' (1/1)	Attendance: 23,137; Referee: Stuart Berry

Bye/s: Brumbies

=== Round 16 ===
29 May 2015	Crusaders	35–18	Hurricanes	Trafalgar Park, Nelson
19:35	Try: Mitchell Drummond 26'; Nafi Tuitavake 47'; Matt Todd 58'; Nemani Nadolo 72'; Con: Dan Carter 27', 48', 59' (3/4); Pen: Dan Carter 11', 18', 22' (3/3); Cards: Robbie Fruean (yellow card) 31' to 41'	Report; Scoreboard	Try: Dane Coles 34'; Ardie Savea 41'; Con: Otere Black 42' (1/2); Pen: Otere Black 20', 56' (2/2)	Attendance: 14,500; Referee: Ben O'Keeffe

29 May 2015	Brumbies	22–16	Bulls	GIO Stadium, Canberra
19:40	Try: Jordan Smiler 30'; Henry Speight 45', 58'; Con: Christian Lealiifano 46', 59' (2/3); Pen: Christian Lealiifano 25' (1/3); Drop: Nic White (0/1)	Report; Scoreboard	Try: Lappies Labuschagné 67'; Con: Handré Pollard 68' (1/1); Pen: Handré Pollard 16', 23', 43' (3/4); Drop: Handré Pollard (0/1)	Attendance: 9,791; Referee: Marius van der Westhuizen

29 May 2015	Sharks	25–21	Rebels	Kings Park Stadium, Durban
19:10	Try: S'bura Sithole 34'; Lwazi Mvovo 44'; Heimar Williams 51'; Con: Lionel Cronjé 35', 52' (2/3); Pen: Lionel Cronjé 17', 73' (2/2); Cards: Jannie du Plessis (yellow card) 29' to 41'	Report; Scoreboard	Try: Scott Higginbotham 40', 59'; Bryce Hegarty 75'; Con: Jack Debreczeni 40', 60', 76' (3/3); Pen: Jack Debreczeni (0/1); Cards: Laurie Weeks (red card) 29'	Attendance: 18,567; Referee: Jaco van Heerden

30 May 2015	Highlanders	36–9	Chiefs	Rugby Park, Invercargill
19:35	Try: Patrick Osborne 29'; Waisake Naholo 44'; Richard Buckman 72'; Ben Smith 78'; Con: Lima Sopoaga 45', 73' (2/4); Pen: Lima Sopoaga 9', 12', 61', 67' (4/5)	Report; Scoreboard	Pen: Damian McKenzie 18', 51', 58' (3/4)	Attendance: 11,000; Referee: Nick Briant

30 May 2015	Force	10–32	Reds	nib Stadium, Perth
17:40	Try: Dane Haylett-Petty 38'; Con: Sias Ebersohn 39' (1/1); Pen: Sias Ebersohn 12' (1/1)	Report; Scoreboard	Try: Quade Cooper 17', 63'; Lachlan Turner 34', 47'; Con: Quade Cooper 18', 35', 64' (3/4); Pen: Quade Cooper 29', 57' (2/2)	Attendance: 9,259; Referee: Matt O'Brien

30 May 2015	Stormers	42–12	Cheetahs	Newlands Stadium, Cape Town
17:05	Try: Seabelo Senatla 5', 34'; Damian de Allende 49'; Vincent Koch 64'; Sikhumbuzo Notshe 68'; Con: Demetri Catrakilis 6', 35', 50', 65' (4/4); Kurt Coleman (0/1); Pen: Demetri Catrakilis 4', 10', 17' (3/3)	Report; Scoreboard	Try: Boom Prinsloo 24'; Carel Greeff 76'; Con: Joe Pietersen 25' (1/2); Cards: Henco Venter (yellow card) 47' to 57'	Attendance: 39,426; Referee: Craig Joubert

30 May 2015	Lions	27–22	Waratahs	Emirates Airline Park, Johannesburg
19:10	Try: Ruan Combrinck 6', 34'; Harold Vorster 48'; Con: Elton Jantjies 7', 35', 49' (3/3); Pen: Elton Jantjies 28', 43' (2/5)	Report; Scoreboard	Try: Stephen Hoiles 18'; Adam Ashley-Cooper 52'; Rob Horne 58'; Con: Bernard Foley 19', 59' (2/3); Pen: Bernard Foley 9' (1/1); Kurtley Beale (0/1); Cards: Rob Horne (yellow card) 27' to 37'; Jacques Potgieter (yellow card) 45' to 55'	Attendance: 28,475; Referee: Jaco Peyper

Bye/s: Blues

=== Round 17 ===
5 June 2015	Hurricanes	56–20	Highlanders	McLean Park, Napier
19:35	Try: Blade Thomson 15'; James Marshall 19'; TJ Perenara 25', 47'; Dane Coles 36'; Julian Savea 42'; Ma'a Nonu 69', 72'; Con: James Marshall 20', 37', 43', 48', 73' (5/8); Pen: James Marshall 4', 13' (2/2)	Report; Scoreboard	Try: Ryan Tongia 28'; Lima Sopoaga 32'; Marty Banks 44'; Con: Lima Sopoaga 45' (1/3); Pen: Lima Sopoaga (0/1); Drop: Lima Sopoaga 1' (1/1); Cards: Gareth Evans (yellow card) 12' to 24'	Referee: Jaco Peyper

5 June 2015	Force	20–33	Brumbies	nib Stadium, Perth
19:00	Try: Tetera Faulkner 72'; Luke Morahan 75'; Con: Zack Holmes 72', 76' (2/2); Pen: Zack Holmes 14', 16' (2/2); Cards: Steve Mafi (yellow card) 28' to 38'	Report; Scoreboard	Try: David Pocock 10', 28', 66'; Christian Lealiifano 18'; Allan Alaalatoa 60'; Con: Christian Lealiifano 11', 19', 29', 61' (4/5)	Attendance: 9,054; Referee: Angus Gardner

6 June 2015	Rebels	21–20	Bulls	AAMI Park, Melbourne
15:30	Try: Sean McMahon 11'; Jack Debreczeni 40'; Lopeti Timani 59'; Con: Mike Harris 12', 40', 60' (3/3); Pen: Jack Debreczeni (0/1)	Report; Scoreboard	Try: Dean Greyling 4'; Lappies Labuschagné 29'; Con: Jacques-Louis Potgieter 5', 30' (2/2); Pen: Jacques-Louis Potgieter 25', 43' (2/2); Cards: Dean Greyling (yellow card) 54' to 67'	Attendance: 10,123; Referee: Nick Briant

6 June 2015	Blues	11–34	Crusaders	Eden Park, Auckland
19:35	Try: Ben Lam 75'; Con: Simon Hickey (0/1); Pen: Ihaia West 3', 6' (2/2)	Report; Scoreboard	Try: Nemani Nadolo 14'; Luke Romano 34' penalty try 61'; Matt Todd 67'; Con: Dan Carter 15', 35', 62', 68' (4/4); Pen: Dan Carter 26', 47' (2/2)	Attendance: 13,020; Referee: Chris Pollock

6 June 2015	Reds	3–24	Chiefs	Suncorp Stadium, Brisbane
19:40	Pen: Quade Cooper 6' (1/2)	Report; Scoreboard	Try: Bryce Heem 25'; Liam Messam 32'; Charlie Ngatai 69'; Con: Andrew Horrell 26', 33', 70' (3/3); Pen: Andrew Horrell 51' (1/2); Cards: Michael Leitch (yellow card) 39' to 49'	Attendance: 25,841; Referee: Mike Fraser

6 June 2015	Cheetahs	33–58	Waratahs	Free State Stadium, Bloemfontein
15:00	Try: Francois Venter 11', 80'; Cornal Hendricks 14', 55'; Boom Prinsloo 28'; Con: Coenie van Wyk 12', 15', 29' (3/3); Niel Marais 56' (1/2); Cards: Rayno Benjamin (yellow card) 60' to 70'	Report; Scoreboard	Try: Israel Folau 4', 38', 60'; Michael Hooper 8'; Matthew Carraro 19', 76'; Taqele Naiyaravoro 40'; Adam Ashley-Cooper 41'; Bernard Foley 72'; Con: Bernard Foley 9', 40', 61', 73', 77' (5/9); Pen: Bernard Foley 65' (1/1)	Attendance: 5,579; Referee: Glen Jackson

6 June 2015	Stormers	19–19	Lions	Newlands Stadium, Cape Town
17:05	Try: Nic Groom 7'; Dillyn Leyds 29'; Nizaam Carr 52'; Con: Demetri Catrakilis 8' (1/1); Kurt Coleman 53' (1/2); Pen: Demetri Catrakilis (0/1); Kurt Coleman (0/1); Drop: Cheslin Kolbe (0/1); Cards: Steven Kitshoff (yellow card) 74'	Report; Scoreboard	Try: Faf de Klerk 17'; Schalk van der Merwe 35'; Malcolm Marx 76'; Con: Elton Jantjies 18' (1/2); Marnitz Boshoff 77' (1/1)	Attendance: 41,613; Referee: Stuart Berry

Bye/s: Sharks

=== Round 18 ===
12 June 2015	Blues	7–44	Highlanders	Eden Park, Auckland
19:35	Try: Matt McGahan 68'; Con: Ihaia West 69' (1/1); Pen: Ihaia West (0/1)	Report; Scoreboard	Try: John Hardie 11'; Shaun Treeby 26'; Elliot Dixon 40'; Patrick Osborne 51'; Dan Pryor 55'; Joe Latta 65'; Ben Smith 76'; Con: Lima Sopoaga 40', 52', 56' (3/7); Pen: Lima Sopoaga 32' (1/1); Cards: Josh Hohneck (yellow card) 21' to 32'	Attendance: 9,350; Referee: Angus Gardner

12 June 2015	Rebels	11–13	Force	AAMI Park, Melbourne
19:40	Try: Telusa Veainu 71'; Con: Mike Harris (0/1); Pen: Mike Harris 15', 52' (2/4); Drop: Mike Harris (0/1)	Report; Scoreboard	Try: Luke Morahan 65'; Con: Zack Holmes 66' (1/1); Pen: Zack Holmes 2', 18' (2/2)	Attendance: 9,653; Referee: Andrew Lees

13 June 2015	Brumbies	24–37	Crusaders	GIO Stadium, Canberra
15:30	Try: David Pocock 3'; Jarrad Butler 49' penalty try 66'; Con: Christian Lealiifano 4', 50', 67' (3/3); Pen: Christian Lealiifano 17' (1/1); Cards: Jesse Mogg (yellow card) 41' to 52'	Report; Scoreboard	Try: Nemani Nadolo 6', 38'; Matt Todd 29' penalty try 73'; Con: Tom Taylor (0/1); Dan Carter 74' (1/3); Pen: Dan Carter 12', 23', 42', 62', 80' (5/5); Drop: Dan Carter (0/1); Cards: Sam Whitelock (yellow card) 48' to 58'	Attendance: 19,398; Referee: Jaco Peyper

13 June 2015	Chiefs	13–21	Hurricanes	Yarrow Stadium, New Plymouth
19:35	Try: Bryce Heem 16'; Con: Marty McKenzie 17' (1/1); Pen: Marty McKenzie 27', 31' (2/2); Cards: Tom Marshall (yellow card) 35' to 44'	Report; Scoreboard	Try: penalty try 35'; Conrad Smith 38'; James Marshall 54'; Con: James Marshall 36', 39', 55' (3/3)	Referee: Chris Pollock

13 June 2015	Waratahs	31–5	Reds	Allianz Stadium, Sydney
19:40	Try: Dave Dennis 53'; Jacques Potgieter 57'; Brendan McKibbin 68'; Dean Mumm 73'; Con: Bernard Foley 54', 58', 69', 74' (4/4); Pen: Bernard Foley 18' (1/1)	Report; Scoreboard	Try: Quade Cooper 78'; Con: Ben Tapuai (0/1); Pen: Quade Cooper (0/1); Cards: Adam Thomson (yellow card) 50' to 61'	Attendance: 26,746; Referee: Nick Briant

13 June 2015	Bulls	29–42	Cheetahs	Loftus Versfeld, Pretoria
17:05	Try: Jesse Kriel 4'; Francois Hougaard 56', 79'; Pierre Spies 70'; Con: Jacques-Louis Potgieter 5' (1/1); Tian Schoeman 57', 71' (2/3); Pen: Jacques-Louis Potgieter 29' (1/1)	Report; Scoreboard	Try: Niell Jordaan 9'; Henco Venter 18'; Clayton Blommetjies 34'; Sarel Pretorius 40'; Steven Sykes 50'; Rayno Benjamin 73'; Con: Niel Marais 10', 19', 35', 40', 51', 74' (6/6)	Attendance: 21,145; Referee: Craig Joubert

13 June 2015	Sharks	34–12	Stormers	Kings Park Stadium, Durban
19:10	Try: Lionel Cronjé 18'; Stefan Ungerer 40'; Bismarck du Plessis 51'; Lwazi Mvovo 63'; Odwa Ndungane 79'; Con: Lionel Cronjé 52', 64' (2/4); Fred Zeilinga 80' (1/1); Pen: Lionel Cronjé 38' (1/1); Cards: André Esterhuizen (yellow card) 10'	Report; Scoreboard	Pen: Kurt Coleman 9', 24', 34', 48' (4/4); Cards: Robert du Preez (yellow card) 76'	Attendance: 25,824; Referee: Glen Jackson

Bye/s: Lions

== Finals ==
Qualifying finals
20 June – Cape Town
(South Africa) Stormers	19
(Australia) Brumbies	39
20 June – Dunedin
(New Zealand) Highlanders	24
(New Zealand) Chiefs	14

Semi-finals
27 June – Wellington
(New Zealand) Hurricanes	29
(Australia) Brumbies	9
27 June – Sydney
(Australia) Waratahs	17
(New Zealand) Highlanders	35

Final
4 July – Wellington
(New Zealand) Hurricanes	14
(New Zealand) Highlanders	21

=== Qualifying finals ===
20 June 2015	Highlanders	24–14	Chiefs	Forsyth Barr Stadium, Dunedin
19:35	Try: Waisake Naholo 24', 43'; Con: Lima Sopoaga 44' (1/2); Pen: Lima Sopoaga 6', 57', 66', 80' (4/4); Drop: Waisake Naholo (0/1)	Report; Scoreboard	Try: Brodie Retallick 60'; Con: Andrew Horrell (0/1); Pen: Andrew Horrell 8', 28', 40' (3/5)	Attendance: 22,500; Referee: Chris Pollock (New Zealand)

20 June 2015	Stormers	19–39	Brumbies	Newlands Stadium, Cape Town
17:05	Try: Cheslin Kolbe 45'; Con: Demetri Catrakilis 46' (1/1); Pen: Demetri Catrakilis 13', 34', 49', 60' (4/4)	Report; Scoreboard	Try: Joe Tomane 4', 15', 25'; Scott Sio 40'; Ita Vaea 63'; Jesse Mogg 79'; Con: Christian Lealiifano 26', 40', 64' (3/6); Pen: Christian Lealiifano 51' (1/1); Cards: Henry Speight (red card) 74'; Scott Fardy (yellow card) 75'	Attendance: 28,987; Referee: Jaco Peyper (South Africa)

=== Semi-finals ===
27 June 2015	Hurricanes	29–9	Brumbies	Westpac Stadium, Wellington
19:35	Try: Julian Savea 21'; TJ Perenara 28'; Ardie Savea 43'; Matt Proctor 74'; Con: Beauden Barrett 29' (1/2); James Marshall 44', 75' (2/2); Pen: Beauden Barrett (0/1); James Marshall 66' (1/2)	Report; Scoreboard	Pen: Jesse Mogg 40' (1/1); Christian Lealiifano 50', 57' (2/2)	Attendance: 32,675; Referee: Glen Jackson (New Zealand)

27 June 2015	Waratahs	17–35	Highlanders	Allianz Stadium, Sydney
19:55	Try: Rob Horne 11'; Con: Bernard Foley (0/1); Pen: Bernard Foley 23', 31', 37', 51' (4/4); Cards: Jacques Potgieter (yellow card) 58' to 68'	Report; Scoreboard	Try: Aaron Smith 19'; Richard Buckman 33'; Waisake Naholo 53' penalty try 58'; Patrick Osborne 78'; Con: Ben Smith (0/1); Lima Sopoaga 34', 59' (2/4); Pen: Lima Sopoaga 5' (1/3); Drop: Lima Sopoaga 75' (1/2)	Attendance: 32,632; Referee: Craig Joubert (South Africa)

=== Final ===
4 July 2015	Hurricanes	14–21	Highlanders	Westpac Stadium, Wellington
19:35	Try: Ma'a Nonu 36'; Con: Beauden Barrett (0/1); Pen: Beauden Barrett 42', 54', 67' (3/5)	Report; Scoreboard	Try: Elliot Dixon 40'; Waisake Naholo 47'; Con: Lima Sopoaga 40' (1/2); Pen: Lima Sopoaga 5', 29' (2/3); Drop: Lima Sopoaga (0/1); Marty Banks 78' (1/1)	Attendance: 35,896; Referee: Jaco Peyper (South Africa)

== Players ==
=== Player statistics ===
The following table contain points which were scored in the 2015 Super Rugby season:

All point scorers
No	Player	Team	T	C	P	DG	Pts
1	Lima Sopoaga	Highlanders	2	38	31	4	191
2	Bernard Foley	Waratahs	5	33	32	0	187
3	Demetri Catrakilis	Stormers	0	19	43	1	170
3	Christian Lealiifano	Brumbies	4	33	28	0	170
5	Handré Pollard	Bulls	2	17	40	1	167
6	Elton Jantjies	Lions	0	25	34	0	152
7	Dan Carter	Crusaders	3	23	22	0	127
8	Mike Harris	Rebels	1	20	26	0	123
9	Beauden Barrett	Hurricanes	3	17	24	0	121
10	Ihaia West	Blues	1	15	23	0	104
11	Colin Slade	Crusaders	3	20	15	0	100
12	Aaron Cruden	Chiefs	1	14	20	0	93
12	Patrick Lambie	Sharks	2	10	21	0	93
14	Joe Pietersen	Cheetahs	0	19	16	2	92
15	James Marshall	Hurricanes	3	17	6	0	67
16	Waisake Naholo	Highlanders	13	0	0	0	65
17	Kurt Coleman	Stormers	0	9	12	1	57
18	TJ Perenara	Hurricanes	11	0	0	0	55
19	Luke Burton	Force	0	10	9	0	47
20	Nemani Nadolo	Crusaders	9	0	0	0	45
21	James O'Connor	Reds	0	13	6	0	44
22	Quade Cooper	Reds	3	6	5	0	42
22	Jacques-Louis Potgieter	Bulls	0	6	10	0	42
24	Daniel Bowden	Blues	1	6	8	0	41
24	Damian McKenzie	Chiefs	0	7	9	0	41
26	Taqele Naiyaravoro	Waratahs	8	0	0	0	40
26	Patrick Osborne	Highlanders	8	0	0	0	40
26	David Pocock	Brumbies	8	0	0	0	40
26	Boom Prinsloo	Cheetahs	8	0	0	0	40
26	Julian Savea	Hurricanes	8	0	0	0	40
26	Joe Tomane	Brumbies	8	0	0	0	40
26	Lachlan Turner	Reds	6	2	2	0	40
33	François Steyn	Sharks	2	5	6	0	38
34	Jack Debreczeni	Rebels	2	4	6	0	36
35	Rob Horne	Waratahs	7	0	0	0	35
35	Francois Hougaard	Bulls	7	0	0	0	35
35	Aaron Smith	Highlanders	7	0	0	0	35
35	Matt Todd	Crusaders	7	0	0	0	35
35	Francois Venter	Cheetahs	7	0	0	0	35
40	Marty Banks	Highlanders	1	2	7	1	33
41	Sias Ebersohn	Force	0	4	8	0	32
42	Andrew Horrell	Chiefs	1	4	6	0	31
43	Samu Kerevi	Reds	6	0	0	0	30
43	Dillyn Leyds	Stormers	6	0	0	0	30
43	Charlie Ngatai	Chiefs	6	0	0	0	30
46	Ruan Combrinck	Lions	5	0	1	0	28
46	Ben Smith	Highlanders	5	0	0	1	28
48	Zack Holmes	Force	0	4	6	0	26
49	Adam Ashley-Cooper	Waratahs	5	0	0	0	25
49	Marnitz Boshoff	Lions	1	1	6	0	25
49	Marcell Coetzee	Sharks	5	0	0	0	25
49	Faf de Klerk	Lions	5	0	0	0	25
49	Israel Folau	Waratahs	5	0	0	0	25
49	Cornal Hendricks	Cheetahs	5	0	0	0	25
49	Scott Higginbotham	Rebels	5	0	0	0	25
49	James Lowe	Chiefs	5	0	0	0	25
49	Luke Morahan	Force	5	0	0	0	25
49	Lwazi Mvovo	Sharks	5	0	0	0	25
49	Odwa Ndungane	Sharks	5	0	0	0	25
49	Ma'a Nonu	Hurricanes	4	0	0	0	20
49	Jan Serfontein	Bulls	5	0	0	0	25
49	Fred Zeilinga	Sharks	0	8	3	0	25
63	Marty McKenzie	Chiefs	0	4	5	0	23
64	Lionel Cronjé	Sharks	1	4	3	0	22
65	Rayno Benjamin	Cheetahs	4	0	0	0	20
65	Peter Betham	Waratahs	4	0	0	0	20
65	Sam Cane	Chiefs	4	0	0	0	20
65	Damian de Allende	Stormers	4	0	0	0	20
65	Andrew Ellis	Crusaders	4	0	0	0	20
65	Malakai Fekitoa	Highlanders	4	0	0	0	20
65	Bryce Heem	Chiefs	4	0	0	0	20
65	Jaco Kriel	Lions	4	0	0	0	20
65	Nehe Milner-Skudder	Hurricanes	4	0	0	0	20
65	Sefa Naivalu	Rebels	4	0	0	0	20
65	Dom Shipperley	Rebels	4	0	0	0	20
65	Henry Speight	Brumbies	4	0	0	0	20
65	Pierre Spies	Bulls	4	0	0	0	20
65	Jordan Taufua	Crusaders	4	0	0	0	20
65	Lopeti Timani	Rebels	4	0	0	0	20
65	Ita Vaea	Brumbies	4	0	0	0	20
65	Harold Vorster	Lions	4	0	0	0	20
82	Otere Black	Hurricanes	0	4	3	0	17
83	Ben Alexander	Brumbies	3	0	0	0	15
83	Bjorn Basson	Bulls	3	0	0	0	15
83	Heinrich Brüssow	Cheetahs	3	0	0	0	15
83	Matthew Carraro	Waratahs	3	0	0	0	15
83	Dane Coles	Hurricanes	3	0	0	0	15
83	Elliot Dixon	Highlanders	3	0	0	0	15
83	Bismarck du Plessis	Sharks	3	0	0	0	15
83	Gareth Evans	Highlanders	3	0	0	0	15
83	Reggie Goodes	Hurricanes	3	0	0	0	15
83	Matt Hodgson	Force	3	0	0	0	15
83	Stephen Hoiles	Waratahs	3	0	0	0	15
83	Cory Jane	Hurricanes	3	0	0	0	15
83	Jerome Kaino	Blues	3	0	0	0	15
83	Tevita Kuridrani	Brumbies	3	0	0	0	15
83	Lappies Labuschagné	Bulls	3	0	0	0	15
83	Michael Leitch	Chiefs	3	0	0	0	15
83	Lionel Mapoe	Lions	3	0	0	0	15
83	Liam Messam	Chiefs	3	0	0	0	15
83	George Moala	Blues	3	0	0	0	15
83	Melani Nanai	Blues	3	0	0	0	15
83	Matt Proctor	Hurricanes	3	0	0	0	15
83	Dan Pryor	Highlanders	3	0	0	0	15
83	Augustine Pulu	Chiefs	3	0	0	0	15
83	Ardie Savea	Hurricanes	3	0	0	0	15
83	Conrad Smith	Hurricanes	3	0	0	0	15
83	Nic Stirzaker	Rebels	3	0	0	0	15
83	Warwick Tecklenburg	Lions	3	0	0	0	15
83	Ryan Tongia	Highlanders	3	0	0	0	15
83	Stefan Ungerer	Sharks	3	0	0	0	15
83	Piet van Zyl	Bulls	3	0	0	0	15
113	Kurtley Beale	Waratahs	1	0	3	0	14
113	Francois Brummer	Cheetahs	0	4	2	0	14
113	Niel Marais	Cheetahs	0	7	0	0	14
113	Jesse Mogg	Brumbies	1	0	3	0	14
117	Tim Nanai-Williams	Chiefs	2	0	1	0	13
117	Tian Schoeman	Bulls	0	5	1	0	13
117	Nic White	Brumbies	2	0	1	0	13
120	Israel Dagg	Crusaders	2	1	0	0	12
120	Tom Taylor	Crusaders	2	1	0	0	12
120	Lolagi Visinia	Blues	2	1	0	0	12
123	Jason Woodward	Hurricanes	0	4	1	0	11
124	Chris Alcock	Force	2	0	0	0	10
124	Clayton Blommetjies	Cheetahs	2	0	0	0	10
124	Richard Buckman	Highlanders	2	0	0	0	10
124	Jarrad Butler	Brumbies	2	0	0	0	10
124	Angus Cottrell	Force	2	0	0	0	10
124	Juan de Jongh	Stormers	2	0	0	0	10
124	Mitchell Drummond	Crusaders	2	0	0	0	10
124	Tom English	Rebels	2	0	0	0	10
124	Tetera Faulkner	Force	2	0	0	0	10
124	Chris Feauai-Sautia	Reds	2	0	0	0	10
124	Kieron Fonotia	Crusaders	2	0	0	0	10
124	Callum Gibbins	Hurricanes	2	0	0	0	10
124	Liam Gill	Reds	2	0	0	0	10
124	Carel Greeff	Cheetahs	2	0	0	0	10
124	Nic Groom	Stormers	2	0	0	0	10
124	John Hardie	Highlanders	2	0	0	0	10
124	David Havili	Crusaders	2	0	0	0	10
124	Bryce Hegarty	Rebels	2	0	0	0	10
124	Michael Hooper	Waratahs	2	0	0	0	10
124	Cheslin Kolbe	Stormers	2	0	0	0	10
124	Marco Kotze	Reds	2	0	0	0	10
124	Ryan Louwrens	Force	2	0	0	0	10
124	Tom Marshall	Chiefs	2	0	0	0	10
124	Keven Mealamu	Blues	2	0	0	0	10
124	Burger Odendaal	Bulls	2	0	0	0	10
124	Nick Phipps	Waratahs	2	0	0	0	10
124	Sarel Pretorius	Cheetahs	2	0	0	0	10
124	Cobus Reinach	Sharks	2	0	0	0	10
124	Raymond Rhule	Cheetahs	2	0	0	0	10
124	Johann Sadie	Cheetahs	2	0	0	0	10
124	Francis Saili	Blues	2	0	0	0	10
124	Jake Schatz	Reds	2	0	0	0	10
124	Seabelo Senatla	Stormers	2	0	0	0	10
124	Brad Shields	Hurricanes	2	0	0	0	10
124	S'bura Sithole	Sharks	2	0	0	0	10
124	Courtnall Skosan	Lions	2	0	0	0	10
124	Deon Stegmann	Bulls	2	0	0	0	10
124	Blade Thomson	Hurricanes	2	0	0	0	10
124	Matt To'omua	Brumbies	2	0	0	0	10
124	Shaun Treeby	Highlanders	2	0	0	0	10
124	Marcel van der Merwe	Bulls	2	0	0	0	10
124	Coenie van Wyk	Cheetahs	0	5	0	0	10
124	Kobus van Wyk	Stormers	2	0	0	0	10
124	Duane Vermeulen	Stormers	2	0	0	0	10
124	Carl Wegner	Cheetahs	2	0	0	0	10
169	Nick Frisby	Reds	1	0	0	1	8
170	Willie du Plessis	Cheetahs	0	2	1	0	7
171	Mark Abbott	Hurricanes	1	0	0	0	5
171	Allan Alaalatoa	Brumbies	1	0	0	0	5
171	Rory Arnold	Brumbies	1	0	0	0	5
171	Scott Barrett	Crusaders	1	0	0	0	5
171	Dominic Bird	Crusaders	1	0	0	0	5
171	Renaldo Bothma	Sharks	1	0	0	0	5
171	Luke Braid	Blues	1	0	0	0	5
171	Schalk Burger	Stormers	1	0	0	0	5
171	Luke Burgess	Rebels	1	0	0	0	5
171	Nizaam Carr	Stormers	1	0	0	0	5
171	Andries Coetzee	Lions	1	0	0	0	5
171	Adam Coleman	Force	1	0	0	0	5
171	Robbie Coleman	Brumbies	1	0	0	0	5
171	Jean Cook	Cheetahs	1	0	0	0	5
171	Jimmy Cowan	Blues	1	0	0	0	5
171	Pekahou Cowan	Force	1	0	0	0	5
171	Ryan Crotty	Crusaders	1	0	0	0	5
171	Nick Cummins	Force	1	0	0	0	5
171	James Dargaville	Brumbies	1	0	0	0	5
171	Dave Dennis	Waratahs	1	0	0	0	5
171	Thomas du Toit	Sharks	1	0	0	0	5
171	Brendon Edmonds	Highlanders	1	0	0	0	5
171	Hika Elliot	Chiefs	1	0	0	0	5
171	Blake Enever	Brumbies	1	0	0	0	5
171	JJ Engelbrecht	Bulls	1	0	0	0	5
171	Chris Eves	Hurricanes	1	0	0	0	5
171	Colby Fainga'a	Rebels	1	0	0	0	5
171	Charlie Faumuina	Blues	1	0	0	0	5
171	Tom Franklin	Highlanders	1	0	0	0	5
171	Ben Funnell	Crusaders	1	0	0	0	5
171	Will Genia	Reds	1	0	0	0	5
171	Jamison Gibson-Park	Blues	1	0	0	0	5
171	Kyle Godwin	Force	1	0	0	0	5
171	Dean Greyling	Bulls	1	0	0	0	5
171	Frank Halai	Blues	1	0	0	0	5
171	Grant Hattingh	Bulls	1	0	0	0	5
171	Dane Haylett-Petty	Force	1	0	0	0	5
171	James Horwill	Reds	1	0	0	0	5
171	Mitch Inman	Rebels	1	0	0	0	5
171	Akira Ioane	Blues	1	0	0	0	5
171	Huw Jones	Stormers	1	0	0	0	5
171	Luke Jones	Rebels	1	0	0	0	5
171	Niell Jordaan	Cheetahs	1	0	0	0	5
171	Ryan Kankowski	Sharks	1	0	0	0	5
171	Vincent Koch	Stormers	1	0	0	0	5
171	Siya Kolisi	Stormers	1	0	0	0	5
171	Adam Korczyk	Reds	1	0	0	0	5
171	Johnny Kôtze	Stormers	1	0	0	0	5
171	Jesse Kriel	Bulls	1	0	0	0	5
171	Chris Kuridrani	Reds	1	0	0	0	5
171	Ben Lam	Blues	1	0	0	0	5
171	Joe Latta	Highlanders	1	0	0	0	5
171	Tolu Latu	Waratahs	1	0	0	0	5
171	Steven Luatua	Blues	1	0	0	0	5
171	Jone Macilai-Tori	Crusaders	1	0	0	0	5
171	Steve Mafi	Force	1	0	0	0	5
171	SP Marais	Sharks	1	0	0	0	5
171	Malcolm Marx	Lions	1	0	0	0	5
171	Alby Mathewson	Force	1	0	0	0	5
171	Ben McCalman	Force	1	0	0	0	5
171	Richie McCaw	Crusaders	1	0	0	0	5
171	Matt McGahan	Blues	1	0	0	0	5
171	Jake McIntyre	Reds	1	0	0	0	5
171	Brendan McKibbin	Waratahs	1	0	0	0	5
171	Sean McMahon	Rebels	1	0	0	0	5
171	Johnny McNicholl	Crusaders	1	0	0	0	5
171	Howard Mnisi	Lions	1	0	0	0	5
171	Stephen Moore	Brumbies	1	0	0	0	5
171	Tendai Mtawarira	Sharks	1	0	0	0	5
171	Dean Mumm	Waratahs	1	0	0	0	5
171	Sikhumbuzo Notshe	Stormers	1	0	0	0	5
171	Brendon O'Connor	Blues	1	0	0	0	5
171	Jonah Placid	Rebels	1	0	0	0	5
171	Kieran Read	Crusaders	1	0	0	0	5
171	Mark Reddish	Highlanders	1	0	0	0	5
171	Jacques Potgieter	Waratahs	1	0	0	0	5
171	Brodie Retallick	Chiefs	1	0	0	0	5
171	Michael Rhodes	Stormers	1	0	0	0	5
171	Luke Romano	Crusaders	1	0	0	0	5
171	Mitchell Scott	Force	1	0	0	0	5
171	Rob Simmons	Reds	1	0	0	0	5
171	Scott Sio	Brumbies	1	0	0	0	5
171	Will Skelton	Waratahs	1	0	0	0	5
171	Jordan Smiler	Brumbies	1	0	0	0	5
171	Toby Smith	Rebels	1	0	0	0	5
171	Liam Squire	Chiefs	1	0	0	0	5
171	Steven Sykes	Cheetahs	1	0	0	0	5
171	Lausii Taliauli	Brumbies	1	0	0	0	5
171	Codie Taylor	Crusaders	1	0	0	0	5
171	Heath Tessmann	Force	1	0	0	0	5
171	Jeremy Thrush	Hurricanes	1	0	0	0	5
171	Patrick Tuipulotu	Blues	1	0	0	0	5
171	Nafi Tuitavake	Crusaders	1	0	0	0	5
171	Matt Vaega	Blues	1	0	0	0	5
171	Akker van der Merwe	Lions	1	0	0	0	5
171	Schalk van der Merwe	Lions	1	0	0	0	5
171	Michael van der Spuy	Cheetahs	1	0	0	0	5
171	Jacques van Rooyen	Lions	1	0	0	0	5
171	Francois van Wyk	Force	1	0	0	0	5
171	Telusa Veainu	Rebels	1	0	0	0	5
171	Henco Venter	Cheetahs	1	0	0	0	5
171	Victor Vito	Hurricanes	1	0	0	0	5
171	Sam Whitelock	Crusaders	1	0	0	0	5
171	Sonny Bill Williams	Chiefs	1	0	0	0	5
171	Heimar Williams	Sharks	1	0	0	0	5
171	Jack Wilson	Sharks	1	0	0	0	5
171	Sam Wykes	Force	1	0	0	0	5
278	Karmichael Hunt	Reds	0	0	1	0	3
278	Hayden Parker	Highlanders	0	0	1	0	3
280	Jaco van der Walt	Lions	0	1	0	0	2
—	penalty try	Crusaders	4	0	0	0	20
—	penalty try	Chiefs	3	0	0	0	15
—	penalty try	Stormers	3	0	0	0	15
—	penalty try	Reds	2	0	0	0	10
—	penalty try	Brumbies	1	0	0	0	5
—	penalty try	Highlanders	1	0	0	0	5
—	penalty try	Hurricanes	1	0	0	0	5
* Legend: T = Tries, C = Conversions, P = Penalties, DG = Drop Goals, Pts = Points.

== Referees ==
The following refereeing panel was appointed by SANZAR for the 2015 Super Rugby season:

== Attendances ==
Team	Main Stadium	Capacity	Total Attendance	Average Attendance	% Capacity
(New Zealand) Blues	Eden Park	50,000	78,490	9,811	
(New Zealand) Chiefs	Waikato Stadium	25,800			
(New Zealand) Hurricanes	Westpac Stadium	34,500			
(New Zealand) Crusaders	Rugby League Park	18,000			
(New Zealand) Highlanders	Forsyth Barr Stadium	30,728			
(Australia) Reds	Suncorp Stadium	52,500	174,241	21,780	41%
(Australia) Brumbies	Canberra Stadium	25,011	99,645	12,455	49%
(Australia) Waratahs	Allianz Stadium	44,000	202,169	22,463	
(Australia) Melbourne Rebels	AAMI Park	29,500			
(Australia) Western Force	nib Stadium	20,500	87,157	10,894	53%
(South Africa) Sharks	ABSA Stadium	52,000	158,931	19,866	38%
(South Africa) Bulls	Loftus Versfeld	51,792	201,859	25,232	48%
(South Africa) Lions	Ellis Park	62,567	186,413	23,301	37%
(South Africa) Cheetahs	Free State Stadium	46,000	123,087	15,385	33%
(South Africa) Stormers	Newlands Stadium	51,900	318,693	35,410	68%
