= Hoërskool Marais Viljoen =

Public school in Gauteng, South Africa

Coordinates: 26.2701°S 28.1063°E

- Marais Viljoen High School

Location
- Cradock Street, Alberante; Alberton, Gauteng; South Africa

Information
- School type: Public
- Motto: Scienta est Vires (Knowledge is Strength)
- Religious affiliation: Christianity
- Established: 1 September 1961; 64 years ago
- School number: +27 (011) 907 9013
- Staff: 100 full-time
- Grades: 8–12
- Gender: Boys & Girls
- Age: 13 to 18
- Enrollment: 1,600 pupils
- Language: Afrikaans English
- Schedule: 07:30 - 14:00
- Campus: Urban Campus
- Campus type: Suburban
- Colours: Blue; White; Yellow
- Song: Marais Viljoen anthem
- Nickname: Viljoentjies
- Rival: Hoërskool Alberton
- Accreditation: Gauteng Department of Education
- Website: www.maraisviljoen.co.za

Hoërskool Marais Viljoen (English: Marais Viljoen High School) is a public Afrikaans medium and English medium co-educational high school situated in the city of Alberton in the Gauteng province of South Africa. It is one of the top and most academic schools in Gauteng province.

== History ==
The school is named after former State President and MP for Alberton, Marais Viljoen. He officially opened the school on 1 September 1961.

Mr Piet Myburgh was appointed as the first principal. He was succeeded by Mr Philip Fouché in 1979.

Mr Fouché retired in 1989 and was replaced by Hannes le Roux from April 1989 to March 2004. In April 2004 Mrs Martie Heystek was appointed as acting principal. On 1 January 2005 she was appointed as the principal of Marais Viljoen.

From its inception, Marais Viljoen was classified as a technical and vocational school, but the vocational aspect was phased out in 1979. Marais Viljoen has since offered a technical, scientific and general study direction, with a broad choice of subjects.

As a result of the expansion in the fields of study, it was decided in 1995 that Marais Viljoen Technical would in future be known as Marais Viljoen High School.

== Sport ==
Marais Viljoen High School has been performing very well on sports during the year.

The sports that are offered in the school are:

- Archery
- Athletics
- Chess
- Cricket
- Cross country
- Equestrian
- Golf
- Hockey (Boys & Girls)
- Netball (Girls)
- Rugby (Boys)
- Shooting
- Sqaush
- Swimming
- Table tennis
- Tennis
- Water polo

== Notable alumni ==
- Phillip Lloyd, professional wrestler
- Shane Kirkwood
