= 2012 ITM Cup =

2012 rugby union competition in New Zealand

2012 ITM Cup season
- Countries: New Zealand
- Date: 23 August – 27 October
- Champions: Canterbury
- Runners-up: Auckland
- Promoted: Counties Manukau
- Relegated: Hawke's Bay
- Matches played: 76
- Tries scored: 448 (average 5.9 per match)
- Top point scorer: Gareth Anscombe (Auckland); 191 points
- Top try scorer: Johnny McNicholl (Canterbury); 10 tries

Official website
- www.provincial.rugby

The 2012 ITM Cup season was the seventh season of New Zealand's provincial rugby union competition since it turned professional in 2006. The regular season began on 23 August, when Hawke's Bay hosted Auckland. It involved the top fourteen rugby unions of New Zealand. For sponsorship reasons, the competition was known as the ITM Cup and it was the third season under the lead sponsor. The winner of the Championship, Counties Manukau was promoted to the Premiership, the seventh placed Premiership team, Hawke's Bay was relegated to the Championship.

== Format ==
The ITM Cup standings were sorted by a competition points system. Four points were awarded to the winning team, a draw equaled two points, whilst a loss amounted to zero points. Unions could also win their side a respectable bonus point. To receive a bonus point, they must have scored four tries or more or lose by seven or fewer points or less. Each team was placed on their total points received. If necessary of a tiebreaker, when two or more teams finish on equal points, the union who defeated the other in a head-to-head got placed higher. In case of a draw between them, the side with the biggest points deferential margin got rights to be ranked above. If they were tied on points difference, it was then decided by a highest scored try count or a coin toss. This seeding format was implemented since the beginning of the 2006 competition.

The competition included a promotion-relegation process with the winner of the Championship receiving automatic promotion to the Premiership, replacing the seventh-placed team in the Premiership which was relegated to the Championship for the following year. The regular season consisted of two types of matches. The internal division matches were when each team played the other six unions in their division once, home or away. The cross-division matches were when each team played four teams from the other division, thus missing out on three teams, each from the opposite division. Each union played home or away games against teams from the other division, making a total of ten competition games for each union. The finals format allowed the top four teams from each division move on to the semi-finals. The top two division winners, based on table points, received a home semi-final. In the first round of the finals, the semi-finals, the second division winner hosted the third division winner, and the first division winner hosted the fourth division winner. The final was hosted by the top remaining seed.

== Standings ==
Source: ITM Cup standings 2012

Premiership Division
| # | Team | GP | W | D | L | PF | PA | PD | TB | LB | PTS |
|---|---|---|---|---|---|---|---|---|---|---|---|
| 1 | Canterbury | 10 | 8 | 0 | 2 | 419 | 132 | +287 | 6 | 1 | 39 |
| 2 | Wellington | 10 | 8 | 0 | 2 | 323 | 203 | +120 | 7 | 0 | 39 |
| 3 | Auckland | 10 | 8 | 0 | 2 | 322 | 252 | +70 | 5 | 0 | 37 |
| 4 | Taranaki | 10 | 7 | 0 | 3 | 323 | 266 | +57 | 5 | 0 | 33 |
| 5 | RS – Waikato | 10 | 6 | 0 | 4 | 272 | 230 | +42 | 3 | 1 | 28 |
| 6 | Bay of Plenty | 10 | 3 | 0 | 7 | 232 | 311 | –79 | 3 | 1 | 16 |
| 7 | Hawke's Bay | 10 | 3 | 0 | 7 | 170 | 301 | –131 | 1 | 1 | 14 |

Championship Division
| # | Team | GP | W | D | L | PF | PA | PD | TB | LB | PTS |
|---|---|---|---|---|---|---|---|---|---|---|---|
| 1 | Counties Manukau | 10 | 6 | 0 | 4 | 317 | 227 | +90 | 7 | 3 | 34 |
| 2 | Otago | 10 | 5 | 0 | 5 | 292 | 285 | +7 | 4 | 2 | 26 |
| 3 | Tasman | 10 | 5 | 0 | 5 | 209 | 227 | –18 | 2 | 2 | 24 |
| 4 | Southland | 10 | 4 | 0 | 6 | 150 | 276 | –126 | 1 | 2 | 19 |
| 5 | Northland | 10 | 3 | 0 | 7 | 225 | 319 | –94 | 3 | 2 | 17 |
| 6 | Manawatu | 10 | 3 | 0 | 7 | 198 | 321 | –123 | 2 | 2 | 16 |
| 7 | North Harbour | 10 | 1 | 0 | 9 | 205 | 307 | –102 | 2 | 3 | 9 |

=== Standings progression ===
Premiership
| Team | W1 | W2 | W3 | W4 | W5 | W6 | W7 | W8 |
|---|---|---|---|---|---|---|---|---|
| Auckland | 4 (4th) | 9 (4th) | 14 (3rd) | 14 (4th) | 24 (1st) | 28 (3rd) | 33 (3rd) | 37 (3rd) |
| Bay of Plenty | 0 (7th) | 4 (7th) | 4 (7th) | 9 (6th) | 11 (5th) | 16 (5th) | 16 (6th) | 16 (6th) |
| Canterbury | 1 (5th) | 10 (2nd) | 14 (1st) | 14 (3rd) | 19 (4th) | 24 (4th) | 29 (4th) | 39 (1st) |
| Hawke's Bay | 1 (6th) | 5 (6th) | 5 (6th) | 5 (7th) | 10 (7th) | 14 (7th) | 14 (7th) | 14 (7th) |
| Taranaki | 5 (2nd) | 10 (3rd) | 14 (2nd) | 18 (2nd) | 23 (2nd) | 28 (2nd) | 33 (2nd) | 33 (4th) |
| Waikato | 5 (1st) | 6 (5th) | 6 (5th) | 10 (5th) | 10 (6th) | 14 (6th) | 24 (5th) | 28 (5th) |
| Wellington | 4 (3rd) | 14 (1st) | 14 (4th) | 19 (1st) | 20 (3rd) | 29 (1st) | 34 (1st) | 39 (2nd) |
Championship
| Team | W1 | W2 | W3 | W4 | W5 | W6 | W7 | W8 |
| Counties Manukau | 5 (1st) | 6 (1st) | 16 (1st) | 21 (1st) | 26 (1st) | 27 (1st) | 29 (1st) | 34 (1st) |
| Manawatu | 0 (5th) | 0 (7th) | 5 (5th) | 9 (5th) | 10 (6th) | 10 (6th) | 15 (5th) | 16 (6th) |
| North Harbour | 0 (6th) | 0 (5th) | 1 (7th) | 2 (7th) | 2 (7th) | 4 (7th) | 4 (7th) | 9 (7th) |
| Northland | 1 (4th) | 5 (4th) | 9 (4th) | 13 (3rd) | 15 (4th) | 16 (4th) | 16 (4th) | 17 (5th) |
| Otago | 5 (2nd) | 5 (3rd) | 9 (3rd) | 9 (4th) | 19 (2nd) | 20 (2nd) | 25 (2nd) | 26 (2nd) |
| Southland | 0 (7th) | 0 (6th) | 1 (6th) | 7 (6th) | 11 (5th) | 15 (5th) | 15 (6th) | 19 (4th) |
| Tasman | 4 (3rd) | 5 (2nd) | 10 (2nd) | 15 (2nd) | 15 (3rd) | 16 (3rd) | 20 (3rd) | 24 (3rd) |
The table above shows each team's progression throughout the season. For each week, their cumulative points total is shown with the overall division log position in brackets.
| Key: | win | draw | loss | bye | | | | |

== Regular season ==
The 2012 ITM Cup was played across eight weeks with every team playing two Tuesday or Wednesday night fixtures in a double-up round where they played twice that week. The competition started on Thursday, 23 August, with Hawke's Bay taking on Auckland at McLean Park.

=== Week 1 ===
23 August 2012
19:35 NZST

| Hawke's Bay | 29–36 | Southland |
| Try: Andrew Horrell 42'; Star Timu 52'; Con: Daniel Waenga (2/2) 43', 53'; Pen: Daniel Waenga (5/7) 17', 23', 28', 46', 58' | Report | Try: Charlie Faumuina 20'; Ben Lam 33'; Alby Mathewson 72'; Con: Gareth Anscombe (3/3) 21', 34', 73'; Pen: Gareth Anscombe (5/8) 2', 4', 31', 36', 60' |

McLean Park, Napier
Referee: Garratt Williamson

24 August 2012
18:05 NZST

| Manawatu | 11–30 | Wellington |
| Try: David Te Moana 76'; Con: Nathan George (0/1); Pen: Nathan George (2/3) 8', 31' | Report | Try: Ardie Savea 25'; Shaun Treeby 33'; Jeremy Thrush 48'; Con: Jason Woodward (3/3) 26', 34', 49'; Pen: Jason Woodward (3/5) 18', 44', 65' |

Arena Manawatu, Palmerston North
Referee: Bryce Lawrence

24 August 2012
20:05 NZST

| Tasman | 25–22 | Canterbury |
| Try: Shane Christie 24'; Robbie Malneek 51'; Kieron Fonotia 78'; Con: Andrew Goodman (2/3) 52', 79'; Pen: Andrew Goodman (1/3) 29'; Drop: Hayden Cripps 39' | Report | Try: Johnny McNicholl 76'; Con: Tyler Bleyendaal (1/1) 77'; Pen: Tom Taylor (4/4) 3', 26', 39', 48'; Tyler Bleyendaal (1/2) 62' |

Trafalgar Park, Nelson
Referee: Richard Kelly

25 August 2012
14:35 NZST

| Bay of Plenty | 22–37 | Taranaki |
| Try: Lelia Masaga 23'; Culum Retallick 64'; Lance MacDonald 75'; Con: Kendrick Lynn (0/1); Nick McCashin (2/2) 65', 76'; Pen: Kendrick Lynn (1/3) 4' | Report | Try: James Broadhurst 28'; Waisake Naholo 36'; Beauden Barrett 49'; Jason Eaton 79'; Con: Beauden Barrett (4/4) 29', 37', 50', 79'; Pen: Beauden Barrett (3/3) 8', 17', 71'; Cards: Willie Rickards (yellow card) 39' |

Baypark Stadium, Tauranga
Referee: Kane McBride

25 August 2012
16:35 NZST

| Otago | 46–34 | Northland |
| Try: Jayden Spence 9'; Tamati Ellison 19'; Tony Ensor 55'; Buxton Popoali'i 68'; Con: Hayden Parker (4/4) 10', 20', 55', 69'; Pen: Hayden Parker (6/7) 3', 14', 27', 44', 51', 65' | Report | Try: Matt Wallis 22'; Jack Whetton 42'; Samisoni Fisilau 47'; Eddie Paea 72'; Con: Ash Moeke (4/4) 23', 42', 48', 73'; Pen: Ash Moeke (2/2) 12', 35'; Cards: Samisoni Fisilau (yellow card) 31' |

Forsyth Barr Stadium, Dunedin
Referee: Jonathon White

26 August 2012
14:35 NZST

| North Harbour | 22–42 | Waikato |
| Try: Nafi Tuitavake 7'; James Parsons 47'; Brenton Helleur 74'; Con: Michael Hobbs (1/2) 9'; Codey Rei (1/1) 75'; Pen: Michael Hobbs (0/1); Luke Devcich (1/1) 58' | Report | Try: Tim Mikkelson 16'; Toby Smith 54'; Tawera Kerr-Barlow 55'; Alex Bradley 64'; Brendon Leonard 67'; Kalem Chan Boon 77'; Con: Trent Renata (3/6) 54', 56', 68'; Pen: Trent Renata (2/2) 3', 22' |

North Harbour Stadium, Albany
Referee: Vinny Munro

26 August 2012
16:35 NZST

| Counties Manukau | 30–9 | Southland |
| Try: Fritz Lee (2) 7', 39'; Simon Lemalu 46'; Bundee Aki 79'; Con: Baden Kerr (2/3) 10', 47'; Tim Nanai-Williams (0/1); Pen: Baden Kerr (2/5) 6', 29' | Report | Pen: Scott Eade (3/3) 13', 32', 42' |

ECOLight Stadium, Pukekohe
Referee: Nick Briant

=== Week 2 ===
28 August 2012
19:35 NZST

| Wellington | 30–15 | Hawke's Bay |
| Try: Victor Vito 48'; Dane Coles 65'; Arden David-Perrot 69'; Jason Woodward 74'; Con: Jason Woodward (2/4) 49', 65'; Pen: Jason Woodward (2/2) 4', 19' | Report | Try: Hika Elliot 16'; Daniel Waenga 33'; Con: Daniel Waenga (1/2) 33'; Pen: Daniel Waenga (1/2) 27'; Andrew Horrell (0/1) |

Wellington Regional Stadium, Wellington
Referee: Glen Jackson

29 August 2012
19:35 NZST

| Canterbury | 33–11 | Auckland |
| Try: Andy Ellis (2) 10', 29'; Willi Heinz 79'; Con: Tom Taylor (2/2) 11', 29'; Tyler Bleyendaal (1/1) 80'; Pen: Tom Taylor (4/4) 16', 24', 47', 71' | Report | Try: Ben Lam 3'; Con: Gareth Anscombe (0/1); Pen: Gareth Anscombe (2/2) 18', 34' |

Rugby League Park, Christchurch
Referee: Mike Fraser

30 August 2012
19:35 NZST

| Bay of Plenty | 31–19 | Otago |
| Try: Tristan Moran (2) 54', 67'; Luke Braid 57'; Con: Nick McCashin (2/3) 55', 59'; Pen: Nick McCashin (4/5) 8', 22', 25', 38'; Cards: Kendrick Lynn (yellow card) 77' | Report | Try: Tony Ensor 77'; Con: Hayden Parker (1/1) 77'; Pen: Hayden Parker (4/5) 6', 20', 31', 40'; Cards: TJ Ioane (yellow card) 53' |

Rotorua International Stadium, Rotorua
Referee: Shaun Elliott

31 August 2012
19:35 NZST

| Hawke's Bay | 37–30 | Counties Manukau |
| Try: Hika Elliot 38'; Tua Saseve 60'; Daniel Waenga 71'; Con: Daniel Waenga (2/3) 39', 71'; Pen: Daniel Waenga (6/6) 10', 16', 23', 26', 34', 52' | Report | Try: Tim Nanai-Williams 13'; Augustine Pulu 19'; Sherwin Stowers 48'; Con: Baden Kerr (3/3) 13', 20', 49'; Pen: Baden Kerr (3/3) 5', 8', 29'; Cards: Simon Lemalu (yellow card) 33' |

McLean Park, Napier
Referee: Richard Kelly

1 September 2012
14:35 NZST

| Canterbury | 36–3 | North Harbour |
| Try: Robbie Fruean 15'; Johnny McNicholl (2) 45', 63'; Nasi Manu 62'; Andy Ellis 71'; Con: Tom Taylor (4/5) 15', 46', 63', 72'; Pen: Tom Taylor (1/2) 25' | Report | Pen: Bryn Hall (1/1) 32' |

Rugby League Park, Christchurch
Referee: Keith Brown

1 September 2012
17:35 NZST

| Waikato | 27–29 | Northland |
| Try: Matt Vant Leven 7'; Marcel Cummings-Toone 28'; Declan O'Donnell 73'; Con: Trent Renata (3/3) 8', 28', 73'; Pen: Trent Renata (2/4) 37', 50'; Cards: Sam Christie (yellow card) 56' | Report | Try: Fa'atoina Autagavaia 9'; Mateo Malupo 42'; Dan Pryor 77'; Con: Ash Moeke (1/3) 78'; Pen: Ash Moeke (4/5) 3', 19', 32', 47' |

Waikato Stadium, Hamilton
Referee: Sheldon Eden-Whaitiri

1 September 2012
19:34 NZST

| RS – Taranaki | 49–40 | Tasman |
| Try: Blade Thomson 1'; Kurt Baker (2) 8', 25'; Waisake Naholo 18'; Beauden Barrett 79'; Con: Beauden Barrett (3/5) 2', 9', 18'; Pen: Beauden Barrett (6/7) 7', 37', 44', 46', 49', 57' | Report | Try: James Lowe 5'; Campbell Johnstone 22'; Tim Perry 32'; Quentin MacDonald 41'; Robbie Malneek 60'; Con: Andrew Goodman (3/5) 5', 23', 32'; Pen: Andrew Goodman (3/3) 11', 30', 38'; Cards: Vernon Fredericks (yellow card) 56' |

Yarrow Stadium, New Plymouth
Referee: Glen Jackson

2 September 2012
14:35 NZST

| Auckland | 59–16 | Manawatu |
| Try: George Moala 9'; Charles Piutau (3) 18', 51', 69'; Hadleigh Parkes 27'; Nepia Fox-Matamua 40'; Gareth Anscombe 46'; George Moala 74'; Con: Gareth Anscombe (6/6) 9', 18', 28', 41', 46', 51'; Simon Hickey (2/2) 70', 74'; Pen: Gareth Anscombe (1/1) 4' | Report | Try: Callum Gibbins 23'; Con: Craig Clare (1/1) 24'; Pen: Craig Clare (3/3) 7', 15', 44' |

Eden Park, Auckland
Referee: Nick Briant

2 September 2012
16:35 NZST

| Wellington | 40–8 | Southland |
| Try: Alapati Leiua (2) 16', 67'; Ardie Savea (2) 33', 63'; Dane Coles 71'; Con: Jason Woodward (3/5) 16', 32', 64'; Pen: Jason Woodward (3/3) 5', 12', 25' | Report | Try: Cardiff Vaega 59'; Con: Marty McKenzie (0/1); Pen: Marty McKenzie (1/2) 14' |

Wellington Regional Stadium, Wellington
Referee: Matthew Muir

=== Week 3 ===
4 September 2012
19:35 NZST

| North Harbour | 15–27 | Counties Manukau |
| Try: Cory Aporo (2) 39', 60'; Con: James Semple (1/1) 61'; Bryn Hall (0/1); Pen: Bryn Hall (1/2) 8' | Report | Try: Simon Lemalu 20'; Tim Nanai-Williams 31'; Frank Halai 39'; Maka Tatafu 65'; Con: Baden Kerr (2/3) 20', 39'; Tim Nanai-Williams (0/1); Pen: Baden Kerr (1/2) 42'; Cards: Bundee Aki (yellow card) 72' |

North Harbour Stadium, Albany
Referee: Glen Jackson

5 September 2012
19:35 NZST

| Northland | 20–33 | Manawatu |
| Try: Daniel Faleafa 74'; Rene Ranger 78'; Con: Ash Moeke (2/2) 74', 79'; Pen: Ash Moeke (2/2) 13', 27'; Cards: Justin Davies (yellow card) 44'; Bryce Williams (yellow card) 57' | Report | Try: Grant Polson 15'; Jason Emery 24'; Craig Clare 38'; George Tilsley 66'; Con: Craig Clare (2/4) 15', 39'; Pen: Craig Clare (3/4) 11', 44', 62' |

Okara Park, Whangārei
Referee: Garratt Williamson

6 September 2012
19:35 NZST

| Southland | 10–15 | Otago |
| Try: Nathan Hohaia 39'; Con: Marty McKenzie (1/1) 39'; Pen: Marty McKenzie (1/3) 66' | Report | Pen: Hayden Parker (4/5) 17', 23', 38', 49'; Peter Breen (1/1) 78'; Glenn Dickson (0/1); Cards: Rob Verbakel (yellow card) 27' |

Rugby Park Stadium, Invercargill
Referee: Bryce Lawrence

7 September 2012
18:05 NZST

| RS – Taranaki | 22–6 | Hawke's Bay |
| Try: Kurt Baker 42'; Jayden Hayward 67'; Scott Waldrom 78'; Con: James Marshall (0/1); Jack Cameron (2/2) 68', 79'; Pen: James Marshall (0/1); Jack Cameron (1/1) 63' | Report | Pen: Daniel Waenga (2/5) 44', 58' |

Yarrow Stadium, New Plymouth
Referee: Keith Brown

7 September 2012
20:05 NZST

| Counties Manukau | 47–13 | Bay of Plenty |
| Try: Adam Cathcart 9'; Rey Lee-Lo 23'; Baden Kerr 27'; Mark Selwyn 37'; Maama Vaipulu 78'; Con: Baden Kerr (4/4) 10', 24', 27', 38'; Rayhan Laulala (1/1) 78'; Pen: Baden Kerr (3/4) 29', 33', 49'; Rayhan Laulala (1/1) 74' | Report | Try: Phil Burleigh 11'; Daniel Goodwin 64'; Con: Nick McCashin (0/2); Pen: Nick McCashin (1/2) 16' |

ECOLight Stadium, Pukekohe
Referee: Mike Fraser

8 September 2012
14:35 NZST

| Auckland | 32–22 | Waikato |
| Try: Charles Piutau 7'; Malakai Fekitoa 27'; Pauliasi Manu 50'; George Moala 52'; Con: Gareth Anscombe (3/4) 8', 51', 55'; Pen: Gareth Anscombe (2/2) 17', 39' | Report | Try: Zak Hohneck 21'; Alex Bradley (2) 37', 62'; Con: Trent Renata (2/3) 38', 62'; Pen: Trent Renata (1/1) 44' |

Eden Park, Auckland
Referee: Richard Kelly

8 September 2012
16:35 NZST

| Canterbury | 20–12 | Wellington |
| Try: Luke Katene 29'; Telusa Veainu (2) 59', 62'; Con: Tom Taylor (1/3) 29'; Pen: Tom Taylor (1/1) 16' | Report | Try: Matt Proctor 39'; Scott Fuglistaller 71'; Con: Jason Woodward (1/2) 72'; Pen: Jason Woodward (0/1) |

Rugby League Park, Christchurch
Referee: Jonathon White

9 September 2012
14:35 NZST

| Manawatu | 3–27 | Tasman |
| Pen: Craig Clare (1/4) 33' | Report | Try: Peter Betham 2'; Robbie Malneek 45'; James Lowe 72'; Jordan Taufua 77'; Con: Andrew Goodman (2/4) 73', 78'; Pen: Andrew Goodman (1/1) 24' |

Arena Manawatu, Palmerston North
Referee: Kane McBride

9 September 2012
16:35 NZST

| Northland | 18–17 | North Harbour |
| Pen: Ash Moeke (6/6) 4', 26', 42', 51', 60', 72'; Cards: Fa'atoina Autagavaia (yellow card) 73' | Report | Try: Nafi Tuitavake 20'; Luke Devcich 39'; Con: Luke Devcich (2/2) 20', 40'; Pen: Luke Devcich (1/3) 39'; James Semple (0/1); Cards: Filo Paulo (yellow card) 32' |

Okara Park, Whangārei
Referee: Nick Briant

=== Week 4 ===
11 September 2012
19:35 NZST

| Waikato | 15–6 | Bay of Plenty |
| Pen: Trent Renata (5/7) 10', 24', 54', 61', 73'; Cards: Piers Francis (yellow card) 36' | Report | Pen: Nick McCashin (2/5) 6', 23' |

Waikato Stadium, Hamilton
Referee: Bryce Lawrence

12 September 2012
19:35 NZST

| Tasman | 13–10 | Southland |
| Try: Peter Betham 28'; Robbie Malneek 48'; Con: Andrew Goodman (0/2); Pen: Andrew Goodman (0/2); Hayden Cripps (1/2) 69' | Report | Try: Alex Ryan 63'; Con: Scott Eade (1/1) 63'; Pen: Marty McKenzie (1/3) 4'; Scott Eade (0/1) |

Lansdowne Park, Blenheim
Referee: Grant Stuart

13 September 2012
19:35 NZST

| North Harbour | 20–23 | Manawatu |
| Try: Sam Hayes-Stevenson 15'; Api Ratuniyarawa 22'; Manu Leiataua 67'; Con: Luke Devcich (1/3) 22'; Pen: Luke Devcich (1/1) 37'; Bryn Hall (0/1) | Report | Try: Jason Emery 56'; Papa Wharewera 79'; Con: Craig Clare (2/2) 56', 79'; Pen: Craig Clare (3/5) 18', 33', 52' |

North Harbour Stadium, Albany
Referee: Richard Kelly

14 September 2012
18:05 NZST

| Bay of Plenty | 37–16 | Auckland |
| Try: Lance MacDonald (2) 18', 28'; Phil Burleigh 68'; Nick McCashin 79'; Con: Nick McCashin (1/4) 19'; Pen: Nick McCashin (5/6) 4', 15', 33', 39', 65' | Report | Try: Gareth Anscombe 47'; Con: Gareth Anscombe (1/1) 48'; Pen: Gareth Anscombe (3/3) 12', 22', 45' |

Rotorua International Stadium, Rotorua
Referee: Keith Brown

14 September 2012
20:05 NZST

| Counties Manukau | 43–12 | Otago |
| Try: Sherwin Stowers (2) 4', 69'; David Bason 45'; Frank Halai 69'; Adam Cathcart 78'; Con: Baden Kerr (3/5) 5', 70', 79'; Pen: Baden Kerr (4/4) 11', 22', 43', 49' | Report | Pen: Hayden Parker (4/4) 8', 24', 34', 39' |

ECOLight Stadium, Pukekohe
Referee: Akihisa Aso (Japan)

15 September 2012
14:35 NZST

| RS – Taranaki | 18–9 | Canterbury |
| Try: James Marshall 33'; Scott Waldrom 76'; Con: Frazier Climo (1/1) 34'; Jack Cameron (0/1); Pen: Frazier Climo (1/5) 6'; Jack Cameron (1/1) 68' | Report | Pen: Tyler Bleyendaal (3/6) 14', 39', 47' |

Yarrow Stadium, New Plymouth
Referee: Garratt Williamson

15 September 2012
16:35 NZST

| Wellington | 29–13 | Waikato |
| Try: Eric Sione 24'; Ardie Savea 39'; Shaun Treeby 60'; Jason Woodward 78'; Con: Jason Woodward (3/4) 25', 39', 61'; Pen: Jason Woodward (1/3) 53' | Report | Try: Ted Tauroa 49'; Con: Trent Renata (1/1) 49'; Pen: Trent Renata (2/6) 11', 37' |

Wellington Regional Stadium, Wellington
Referee: Nick Briant

16 September 2012
14:35 NZST

| Tasman | 17–20 | Northland |
| Try: Filipo Levi 58'; Con: Hayden Cripps (0/1); Pen: Hayden Cripps (3/4) 14', 47', 52'; Andrew Goodman (1/1) 59' | Report | Try: Derek Carpenter 31'; Mateo Malupo 70'; Con: Ash Moeke (2/2) 31', 71'; Pen: Ash Moeke (2/4) 5', 79' |

Lansdowne Park, Blenheim
Referee: Mike Fraser

16 September 2012
16:35 NZST

| Southland | 35–7 | Hawke's Bay |
| Try: Jamie Mackintosh 52'; Jason Rutledge 61'; Tim Cornforth 69'; Dion Bates 75'; Con: Scott Eade (1/1) 52'; Marty McKenzie (2/3) 62', 75'; Pen: Scott Eade (3/3) 21', 27', 35' | Report | Try: Adrian Barone 9'; Con: Daniel Waenga (1/1) 10'; Pen: Daniel Waenga (0/1) |

Rugby Park Stadium, Invercargill
Referee: Sheldon Eden-Whaitiri

=== Week 5 ===
18 September 2012
19:35 NZST

| Otago | 54–25 | North Harbour |
| Try: Gareth Evans (2) 7', 49'; Ben Smith 12'; Buxton Popoali'i 30'; Marshall Suckling 33'; Rob Verbakel 61'; Glenn Dickson 78'; Con: Hayden Parker (2/4) 12', 31'; Glenn Dickson (3/3) 50', 62', 78'; Pen: Hayden Parker (1/1) 25'; Glenn Dickson (2/3) 56', 65' | Report | Try: Bryn Hall 39'; Viliami Fihaki 60'; Manu Leiataua 68'; Con: Bryn Hall (2/2) 39', 61'; Luke Devcich (0/1); Pen: Bryn Hall (2/3) 16', 53' |

Forsyth Barr Stadium, Dunedin
Referee: Shane McDermott

19 September 2012
19:35 NZST

| Auckland | 43–32 | Taranaki |
| Try: Charles Piutau 3'; Alby Mathewson 29'; Steven Luatua 59'; Nathan Hughes 62'; Con: Gareth Anscombe (4/4) 3', 29', 60', 63'; Pen: Gareth Anscombe (4/4) 7', 48', 53', 57'; Simon Hickey (1/1) 66' | Report | Try: Jason Eaton (2) 18', 54'; Jack Cameron 69'; Jamison Gibson-Park 74'; Jackson Ormond 77'; Con: Jack Cameron (2/5) 70', 75'; Pen: Jack Cameron (1/2) 34' |

Eden Park, Auckland
Referee: Glen Jackson

20 September 2012
19:35 NZST

| Manawatu | 28–31 | Counties Manukau |
| Try: Willie Paia'aua 6'; Nehe Milner-Skudder 59'; Lewis Marshall 78'; Con: Craig Clare (2/3) 7', 60'; Pen: Craig Clare (3/3) 4', 23', 39' | Report | Try: Bundee Aki (2) 50', 76'; Sherwin Stowers 61'; Baden Kerr 65'; Con: Baden Kerr (4/4) 50', 61', 66', 76'; Pen: Baden Kerr (1/4) 28' |

Arena Manawatu, Palmerston North
Referee: Garratt Williamson

21 September 2012
19:35 NZST

| Hawke's Bay | 42–41 | Bay of Plenty |
| Try: Gillies Kaka (3) 25', 45', 59'; Penalty try 39'; Tevita Fomai 53'; Ihaia West 79'; Con: Daniel Waenga (1/3) 39'; Ihaia West (2/3) 54', 79'; Pen: Daniel Waenga (2/3) 5', 17' | Report | Try: Sam Cane 10'; Nick McCashin 32'; Maru Henry 35'; Lelia Masaga 42'; Phil Burleigh 48'; Con: Nick McCashin (5/5) 10', 33', 36', 42', 49'; Pen: Nick McCashin (1/2) 20'; Chris Noakes (1/1) 73'; Cards: Tanerau Latimer (yellow card) 39' |

McLean Park, Napier
Referee: Mike Fraser

22 September 2012
14:35 NZST

| North Harbour | 17–27 | Southland |
| Try: Pita Ahki 4'; Bryn Hall 68'; Con: Luke Devcich (2/2) 5', 68'; Pen: Luke Devcich (1/3) 25' | Report | Try: Tim Boys 10'; Jimmy Cowan 60'; Con: Scott Eade (1/2) 61'; Pen: Scott Eade (5/5) 3', 46', 53', 64', 79' |

North Harbour Stadium, Albany
Referee: Akihisa Aso (Japan)

22 September 2012
17:35 NZST

| Auckland | 43–30 | Wellington |
| Try: Gareth Anscombe 22'; Penalty try 28'; Liaki Moli 36'; Ben Lam 66'; Con: Gareth Anscombe (4/4) 22', 29', 37', 66'; Pen: Gareth Anscombe (5/7) 7', 13', 46', 50', 78' | Report | Try: Jeffery Toomaga-Allen 3'; Charlie Ngatai 40'; Alapati Leiua (2) 42', 70'; Con: Jason Woodward (2/4) 4', 71'; Pen: Jason Woodward (2/2) 16', 34'; Cards: Eric Sione (yellow card) 27' |

Eden Park, Auckland
Referee: Bryce Lawrence

22 September 2012
19:35 NZST

| Northland | 31–32 | Taranaki |
| Try: Sonatane Takulua 28'; Rene Ranger 55'; Daniel Caprice 75'; Derek Carpenter 78'; Con: Mathew Wright (3/3) 28', 75', 79'; Orene Ai'i (1/1) 56'; Pen: Orene Ai'i (1/3) 52' | Report | Try: Kurt Baker 38'; Frazier Climo 60'; Con: Frazier Climo (2/2) 38', 61'; Pen: Frazier Climo (6/6) 5', 24', 31', 50', 55', 76' |

Okara Park, Whangārei
Referee: Ben Skeen

23 September 2012
14:35 NZST

| Waikato | 27–52 | Canterbury |
| Try: Toby Smith 23'; Ben May 33'; Brendon Leonard 39'; Con: Trent Renata (3/3) 23', 34', 40'; Pen: Trent Renata (2/4) 9', 47' | Report | Try: Nasi Manu 2'; Robbie Fruean (2) 6', 79'; Johnny McNicholl 12'; George Whitelock 25'; Paea Faʻanunu 66'; Con: Tom Taylor (5/6) 7', 12', 26', 66', 80'; Pen: Tom Taylor (4/5) 22', 54', 61', 69'; Cards: Johnny McNicholl (yellow card) 18' |

Waikato Stadium, Hamilton
Referee: Jonathon White

23 September 2012
16:35 NZST

| Otago | 39–13 | Tasman |
| Try: Jayden Spence 33'; Marshall Suckling (2) 41', 48'; Tony Ensor 77'; Peter Breen 79'; Con: Hayden Parker (4/5) 33', 42', 48', 79'; Pen: Hayden Parker (2/4) 16', 57' | Report | Try: Andrew Goodman 2'; Hayden Cripps 28'; Con: Hayden Cripps (0/1); Andrew Goodman (0/1); Pen: Hayden Cripps (1/1) 25'; Andrew Goodman (0/1) |

Forsyth Barr Stadium, Dunedin
Referee: Glen Jackson

=== Week 6 ===
25 September 2012
19:35 NZST

| Bay of Plenty | 26–36 | Wellington |
| Try: Mafileo Kefu 3'; Lelia Masaga 54'; Con: Chris Noakes (2/2) 4', 55'; Pen: Chris Noakes (4/6) 7', 36', 39', 59'; Nick McCashin (0/1) | Report | Try: Ross Filipo 9'; Alapati Leiua 23'; Shaun Treeby 50'; Con: Lima Sopoaga (3/3) 10', 24', 51'; Pen: Lima Sopoaga (5/5) 2', 18', 39', 62', 78'; Cards: Jeremy Thrush (yellow card) 79' |

Baypark Stadium, Tauranga
Referee: Keith Brown

26 September 2012
19:35 NZST

| Southland | 16–12 | Northland |
| Try: Josh Bekhuis 22'; Con: Scott Eade (1/1) 23'; Pen: Scott Eade (3/5) 10', 14', 62' | Report | Try: Ash Moeke 50'; Tone Kopelani 69'; Con: Ash Moeke (1/2) 51' |

Rugby Park Stadium, Invercargill
Referee: Richard Kelly

27 September 2012
19:35 NZST

| Waikato | 20–19 | Tasman |
| Try: Brendon Leonard 38'; Savenaca Tokula 52'; Con: Piers Francis (2/2) 39', 53'; Pen: Piers Francis (2/4) 4', 20' | Report | Try: Peter Betham 39'; Con: Tom Marshall (1/1) 39'; Pen: Tom Marshall (4/4) 7', 26', 31', 44'; Andrew Goodman (0/1) |

Waikato Stadium, Hamilton
Referee: Garratt Williamson

28 September 2012
19:35 NZST

| Auckland | 22–18 | Counties Manukau |
| Try: Sean Polwart 11'; Con: Gareth Anscombe (1/1) 11'; Pen: Gareth Anscombe (5/6) 32', 37', 39', 44', 67'; Cards: Sean Brookman (yellow card) 79' | Report | Pen: Baden Kerr (6/6) 7', 13', 24', 27', 35', 63'; Cards: Mahonri Schwalger (yellow card) 43' |

Eden Park, Auckland
Referee: Nick Briant

29 September 2012
14:35 NZST

| RS – Taranaki | 59–18 | Manawatu |
| Try: Andre Taylor 11'; Kurt Baker (3) 21', 47', 57'; Frazier Climo (2) 67', 69'; Jackson Ormond 74'; Willie Rickards 78'; Con: Frazier Climo (4/6) 12', 22', 48', 58'; Andre Taylor (1/2) 78'; Pen: Frazier Climo (3/4) 7', 27', 36' | Report | Try: Craig Clare 23'; Reece Robinson 53'; Con: Craig Clare (1/2) 24'; Pen: Craig Clare (2/2) 10', 43' |

Yarrow Stadium, New Plymouth
Referee: Mike Fraser

29 September 2012
17:35 NZST

| Wellington | 34–28 | North Harbour |
| Try: Ardie Savea 14'; Ross Filipo 30'; Lima Sopoaga 33'; Kaipati Gaualofa 53'; Shaun Treeby 61'; Con: Lima Sopoaga (3/5) 15', 54', 62'; Pen: Lima Sopoaga (1/2) 11' | Report | Try: Codey Rei 25'; Jimmy Tuivaiti 38'; Manu Leiataua 64'; Nafi Tuitavake 79'; Con: Bryn Hall (2/2) 26', 39'; Codey Rei (2/2) 65', 79'; Pen: Bryn Hall (0/1); Codey Rei (0/1) |

Wellington Regional Stadium, Wellington
Referee: Jonathon White

29 September 2012
19:35 NZST

| Hawke's Bay | 21–15 | Otago |
| Pen: Andrew Horrell (4/5) 3', 12', 23', 37'; Ihaia West (3/3) 67', 73', 75' | Report | Pen: Hayden Parker (5/6) 14', 26', 30', 52', 63' |

McLean Park, Napier
Referee: Garratt Williamson

30 September 2012
14:35 NZST

| Canterbury | 84–0 | Southland |
| Try: Willi Heinz 11'; Telusa Veainu (2) 15', 18'; Paea Faʻanunu (2) 25', 75'; Robbie Fruean 28'; Johnny McNicholl (3) 38', 63', 71'; Adam Whitelock 39'; Nasi Manu 67'; George Whitelock 79'; Con: Tom Taylor (12/12) 12', 16', 19', 25', 29', 39', 40', 64', 68', 71', 76', 79' | Report |

Rugby League Park, Christchurch
Referee: Bryce Lawrence

30 September 2012
16:35 NZST

| Bay of Plenty | 31–19 | Northland |
| Try: Daniel Goodwin (2) 8', 54'; Carl Axtens 62'; Greg Pleasants-Tate 64'; Con: Chris Noakes (4/4) 8', 55', 63', 65'; Pen: Chris Noakes (1/4) 3' | Report | Try: Mathew Wright (2) 36', 77'; Fa'atoina Autagavaia 70'; Con: Ash Moeke (2/3) 37', 71'; Pen: Ash Moeke (0/1); Cards: Jack Ram (yellow card) 62' |

Baypark Stadium, Tauranga
Referee: Richard Kelly

=== Week 7 ===
2 October 2012
19:35 NZST

| Manawatu | 35–51 | Otago |
| Try: Lewis Marshall 12'; Antonio Kiri Kiri 59'; Callum Gibbins (2) 63', 69'; Con: Nathan George (3/4) 13', 60', 64'; Pen: Nathan George (3/4) 27', 32', 34' | Report | Try: Aki Seiuli 2'; Tony Ensor (2) 14', 71'; TJ Ioane (2) 36', 77'; Glenn Dickson 45'; Con: Hayden Parker (4/4) 3', 17', 37', 46'; Glenn Dickson (2/2) 72', 77'; Pen: Hayden Parker (1/3) 10'; Glenn Dickson (2/2) 68', 79' |

Arena Manawatu, Palmerston North
Referee: Nick Briant

3 October 2012
19:35 NZST

| Taranaki | 10–46 | Waiakto – RS |
| Try: Jamison Gibson-Park 60'; Con: Frazier Climo (1/1) 61'; Pen: Frazier Climo (1/2) 8' | Report | Try: Marcel Cummings-Toone 3'; Trent Renata 11'; Sam Christie 18'; Alex Bradley 36'; Tim Mikkelson (3) 44', 49', 79'; Con: Trent Renata (4/7) 12', 19', 50', 79'; Pen: Trent Renata (1/2) 26'; Cards: Tawera Kerr-Barlow (yellow card) 58' |

Yarrow Stadium, New Plymouth
Referee: Bryce Lawrence

4 October 2012
19:35 NZST

| Tasman | 17–3 | Bay of Plenty |
| Try: Tom Marshall 11'; Quentin MacDonald 28'; Con: Tom Marshall (2/2) 12', 29'; Pen: Tom Marshall (1/4) 16' | Report | Pen: Nick McCashin (1/1) 23' |

Trafalgar Park, Nelson
Referee: Richard Kelly

5 October 2012
19:35 NZST

| Northland | 11–56 | Canterbury |
| Try: Rene Ranger 42'; Con: Ash Moeke (0/1); Pen: Ash Moeke (2/3) 9', 26' | Report | Try: Telusa Veainu 6'; George Whitelock 22'; Johnny McNicholl 36'; Wyatt Crockett 73'; Adam Whitelock 74'; Willi Heinz 77'; Codie Taylor 80'; Con: Tom Taylor (5/6) 7', 23', 73', 75', 78'; Tyler Bleyendaal (1/1) 80'; Pen: Tom Taylor (3/3) 14', 45', 56' |

Okara Park, Whangārei
Referee: Sheldon Eden-Whaitiri

6 October 2012
14:35 NZST

| Manawatu | 20–7 | Hawke's Bay |
| Try: Shaun Curry 42'; David Te Moana 68'; Con: Nathan George (2/2) 43', 69'; Pen: Nathan George (2/3) 36', 47' | Report | Try: Andrew Horrell 20'; Con: Andrew Horrell (1/1) 22'; Pen: Andrew Horrell (0/2) |

Arena Manawatu, Palmerston North
Referee: Garratt Williamson

6 October 2012
17:35 NZST

| Counties Manukau | 28–32 | Waikato |
| Try: Sherwin Stowers 27'; Tim Nanai-Williams 48'; Bundee Aki (2) 53', 57'; Con: Tim Nanai-Williams (1/4) 49'; Pen: Tim Nanai-Williams (1/2) 18'; Rayhan Laulala (1/1) 69' | Report | Try: Joe Webber 37'; Savenaca Tokula (2) 65', 73'; Anthony Wise 77'; Con: Trent Renata (3/4) 38', 74', 77'; Pen: Trent Renata (2/2) 32', 63' |

ECOLight Stadium, Pukekohe
Referee: Mike Fraser

6 October 2012
19:35 NZST

| Otago | 22–49 | Wellington |
| Try: Tom Franklin 27'; TJ Ioane 53'; Shota Horie 71'; Con: Hayden Parker (2/3) 29', 72'; Pen: Hayden Parker (1/1) 18' | Report | Try: Matt Proctor (3) 4', 39', 49'; Ardie Savea 11'; Jeremy Thrush 15'; Frae Wilson 21'; Jason Woodward 60'; Con: Jason Woodward (7/7) 5', 13', 16', 22', 39', 50', 61' |

Forsyth Barr Stadium, Dunedin
Referee: Keith Brown

7 October 2012
14:35 NZST

| Southland | 18–47 | Taranaki |
| Try: Matt Saunders 24'; Tayler Adams 34'; Con: Scott Eade (1/2) 35'; Pen: Scott Eade (2/3) 4', 55' | Report | Try: Frazier Climo 45'; Jayden Hayward 58'; James Marshall (2) 67', 76'; Jackson Ormond 79'; Con: Frazier Climo (5/5) 46', 59', 68', 76', 80'; Pen: Frazier Climo (4/4) 22', 30', 42', 64' |

Rugby Park Stadium, Invercargill
Referee: Nick Briant

7 October 2012
16:35 NZST

| North Harbour | 16–36 | Auckland |
| Try: James Parsons 15'; Con: Codey Rei (1/1) 15'; Pen: Codey Rei (3/4) 5', 24', 36' | Report | Try: Charles Piutau 11'; Gareth Anscombe 17'; Angus Ta'avao 38'; Daniel Braid 62'; Dave Thomas 73'; Con: Gareth Anscombe (4/4) 12', 18', 39', 63'; Simon Hickey (0/1); Pen: Gareth Anscombe (1/2) 32' |

North Harbour Stadium, Albany
Referee: Shane McDermott

=== Week 8 ===
9 October 2012
19:35 NZST

| Counties Manukau | 19–28 | Tasman |
| Try: Jimmy Tupou 66'; Con: Tim Nanai-Williams (1/1) 67'; Pen: Tim Nanai-Williams (4/4) 8', 36', 38', 42' | Report | Try: Robbie Malneek 15'; Peter Betham (2) 20', 53'; Con: Tom Marshall (2/3) 16', 54'; Pen: Tom Marshall (3/3) 33', 49', 57' |

ECOLight Stadium, Pukekohe
Referee: Garratt Williamson

10 October 2012
19:35 NZST

| Hawke's Bay | 3–44 | Canterbury |
| Pen: Andrew Horrell (1/1) 5' | Report | Try: George Whitelock 24'; Codie Taylor 36'; Johnny McNicholl 39'; Nasi Manu 51'; Luke Whitelock 74'; Matt Todd 79'; Con: Tom Taylor (4/6) 25', 40', 75', 80'; Pen: Tom Taylor (2/2) 7', 17' |

McLean Park, Napier
Referee: Nick Briant

11 October 2012
19:35 NZST

| Otago | 19–24 | Auckland |
| Try: Sam Anderson-Heather 19'; Con: Hayden Parker (1/1) 20'; Pen: Hayden Parker (3/3) 6', 15', 58'; Glenn Dickson (1/2) 79'; Cards: Hugh Blake (yellow card) 53' | Report | Try: Dave Thomas 10'; Charles Piutau 68'; Con: Gareth Anscombe (1/2) 69'; Pen: Gareth Anscombe (4/4) 3', 31', 39', 53'; Cards: Liaki Moli (yellow card) 60' |

Forsyth Barr Stadium, Dunedin
Referee: Richard Kelly

12 October 2012
19:35 NZST

| Southland | 17–11 | Manawatu |
| Try: Cardiff Vaega 21'; Marty McKenzie 79'; Con: Scott Eade (2/2) 22', 80'; Pen: Scott Eade (1/1) 43' | Report | Try: Ma'afu Fia 28'; Con: Nathan George (0/1); Pen: Nathan George (1/2) 4'; Craig Clare (1/1) 47' |

Rugby Park Stadium, Invercargill
Referee: Kane McBride

13 October 2012
14:35 NZST

| Northland | 31–44 | Counties Manukau |
| Try: Mateo Malupo (2) 26', 32'; Derek Carpenter 65'; Dan Pryor 70'; Mathew Wright 77'; Con: Mathew Wright (2/2) 71', 78'; Ash Moeke (1/3) 66' | Report | Try: Rey Lee-Lo 13'; Tim Nanai-Williams (2) 38', 58'; Matt Talaese 44'; Sikeli Nabou 49'; Sherwin Stowers 68'; Con: Tim Nanai-Williams (3/5) 14', 38', 59'; Rayhan Laulala (1/1) 69'; Pen: Tim Nanai-Williams (2/2) 8', 18'; Cards: Maama Vaipulu (yellow card) 24' |

Okara Park, Whangārei
Referee: Glen Jackson

13 October 2012
17:35 NZST

| RS – Waikato | 28–3 | Hawke's Bay |
| Try: Alex Bradley 30'; Declan O'Donnell 50'; Savenaca Tokula 61'; Con: Trent Renata (2/3) 31', 51'; Pen: Trent Renata (3/4) 18', 25', 39' | Report | Pen: Andrew Horrell (1/1) 29'; Cards: Maselino Paulino (yellow card) 46' |

Waikato Stadium, Hamilton
Referee: Jonathon White

13 October 2012
19:35 NZST

| Tasman | 10–42 | North Harbour |
| Try: Hayden Cripps 53'; Con: Tom Marshall (1/1) 54'; Pen: Tom Marshall (1/2) 9' | Report | Try: Nafi Tuitavake 23'; Filo Paulo 28'; Bryn Hall 57'; Rudi Wulf 67'; Viliami Fihaki 71'; Con: Codey Rei (4/5) 24', 29', 68', 72'; Pen: Codey Rei (3/3) 6', 21', 45' |

Trafalgar Park, Nelson
Referee: Mike Fraser

14 October 2012
14:35 NZST

| Wellington | 33–17 | Taranaki |
| Try: Tim Bateman 18'; Scott Fuglistaller 30'; Jason Woodward (2) 50', 58'; Con: Jason Woodward (2/4) 19', 31'; Pen: Jason Woodward (3/3) 13', 42', 46' | Report | Try: Jason Eaton 61'; James Broadhurst 74'; James Marshall 78'; Con: Beauden Barrett (1/3) 76'; Cards: Jarrad Hoeata (yellow card) 44' |

Wellington Regional Stadium, Wellington
Referee: Bryce Lawrence

14 October 2012
16:35 NZST

| Canterbury | 63–22 | Bay of Plenty |
| Try: Robbie Fruean (2) 20', 79'; Johnny McNicholl 50'; Adam Whitelock 53'; Joe Moody 57'; Telusa Veainu 66'; George Whitelock 74'; Ryan Crotty 80'; Con: Tom Taylor (5/5) 21', 51', 54', 58', 67'; Tyler Bleyendaal (2/3) 75', 80'; Pen: Tom Taylor (3/3) 14', 33', 38' | Report | Try: Leon Power 34'; Maru Henry 62'; Tristan Moran 76'; Con: Nick McCashin (2/3) 63', 77'; Pen: Nick McCashin (1/3) 28' |

Rugby League Park, Christchurch
Referee: Keith Brown

== Play-offs ==
Semi-finals
1 | Counties Manukau | 48
4 | Southland | 23
2 | Otago | 41
3 | Tasman | 34

Final
1 | Counties Manukau | 41
2 | Otago | 16

Semi-finals
1 | Canterbury | 51
4 | Taranaki | 27
2 | Wellington | 22
3 | Auckland | 33

Final
1 | Canterbury | 31
3 | Auckland | 18

=== Semi-finals ===
==== Championship ====
19 October 2012
19:35 NZST

| Otago | 41–34 | Tasman |
| Try: Hemopo 5' c Thomson 36' m Tanaka 60' c Ensor 66' c Con: Dickson (3/4) 6', 61', 67'; Pen: Dickson (5/5) 14', 51', 63', 74', 78' | Report | Try: Goodman 20' c Betham 45' c Nikoro 57' m Con: Goodman (2/3) 21', 46'; Pen: Goodman (3/5) 9', 11', 71'; Nikoro (2/3) 30', 34'; Cards: Levi (yellow card) 56' |

Forsyth Barr Stadium, Dunedin
Referee: Glen Jackson

20 October 2012
14:05 NZST

| Counties Manukau | 48–23 | Southland |
| Try: Stowers 36' m Aki 43' m Lee-Lo (2) 69' m, 80' c T. Pulu 74' c Forbes 77' c Con: Kerr (3/6) 75', 78', 80'; Pen: Kerr (4/5) 2', 9', 47', 62' | Report | Try: Adams 11' c McKenzie 33' c Con: Eade (2/2) 12', 34'; Pen: Eade (3/5) 17', 31', 56' |

ECOLight Stadium, Pukekohe
Referee: Nick Briant

==== Premiership ====
20 October 2012
16:35 NZST

| Canterbury | 51–27 (a.e.t) | Taranaki |
| Try: Crockett (2) 16' c, 88' c Todd 19' m G. Whitelock 92' c Taufua 97' c Con: T. Taylor (1/2) 17'; Bleyendaal (3/3) 89', 93', 98'; Pen: T. Taylor (5/5) 30', 33', 43', 52', 56'; Bleyendaal (1/1) 95' | Report | Try: Marshall 6' c Eaton 38' c Walker 63' m Tamanivalu 73' m Con: Barrett (2/4) 7', 39'; Pen: Barrett (1/1) 24' |

Rugby League Park, Christchurch
Referee: Mike Fraser

20 October 2012
19:05 NZST

| Wellington | 22–33 | Auckland |
| Try: Filipo 36' m Reddish 42' c Savea 56' c Con: Woodward (2/3) 43', 57'; Pen: Woodward (1/2) 25' | Report | Try: Manu 49' m Fekitoa (2) 58' c, 70' m Parkes 73' c Con: Anscombe (2/4) 59', 74'; Pen: Anscombe (3/4) 7', 27', 30' |

Wellington Regional Stadium, Wellington
Referee: Bryce Lawrence

=== Finals ===
==== Championship ====
26 October 2012
19:35 NZST

| Counties Manukau | 41–16 | Otago |
| Try: A. Pulu (2) 3' c, 59' c Selwyn 28' c Nanai-Williams 72' c Bason 77' c Con: Kerr (4/4) 4', 29', 60', 73'; Stowers (1/1) 78'; Pen: Kerr (2/4) 17', 36' | Report | Try: Thomson 20' c Con: Dickson (1/1) 21'; Pen: Dickson (3/3) 10', 26', 53' |

ECOLight Stadium, Pukekohe
Referee: Keith Brown

==== Premiership ====
27 October 2012
19:35 NZST

| Canterbury | 31–18 | Auckland |
| Try: T. Taylor (2) 10' c, 38' m Veainu 60' c Con: T. Taylor (2/3) 11', 61'; Pen: T. Taylor (3/3) 32', 42', 48'; Drop: Bleyendaal (1/1) 56' | Report | Try: Parkes 2' c Visinia 79' m Con: Anscombe (1/2) 3'; Pen: Anscombe (2/3) 14', 28' |

Rugby League Park, Christchurch
Referee: Glen Jackson

| FB | 15 | Tom Taylor |
| RW | 14 | Telusa Veainu | (yellow card) 32' | | | (substituted off) 76' |
| OC | 13 | Robbie Fruean | | (substituted off) 18' | (substituted on) 21' |
| IC | 12 | Ryan Crotty | | (substituted off) 77' |
| LW | 11 | Johnny McNicholl |
| FH | 10 | Tyler Bleyendaal |
| SH | 9 | Andy Ellis | | (substituted off) 75' |
| N8 | 8 | Luke Whitelock |
| OF | 7 | Matt Todd | | (substituted off) 75' |
| BF | 6 | George Whitelock (c) |
| RL | 5 | Dominic Bird | | (substituted off) 51' | (substituted on) 59' |
| LL | 4 | Joel Everson | | | (substituted off) 59' |
| TP | 3 | Ben Franks | | (substituted off) 66' | (substituted on) 71' | (substituted off) 73' |
| HK | 2 | Ben Funnell | | (substituted off) 52' |
| LP | 1 | Wyatt Crockett |
Replacements:
| HK | 16 | Codie Taylor | | (substituted on) 52' |
| PR | 17 | Joe Moody | | (substituted on) 66' | (substituted off) 71' | (substituted on) 73' |
| LK | 18 | Nasi Manu | | (substituted on) 51' |
| FL | 19 | Jordan Taufua | | (substituted on) 75' |
| SH | 20 | Willi Heinz | | (substituted on) 75' |
| CE | 21 | Kolio Hifo | | (substituted on) 77' |
| WG | 22 | Stephen Gee | | (substituted on) 18' | (substituted off) 21' | (substituted on) 76' |

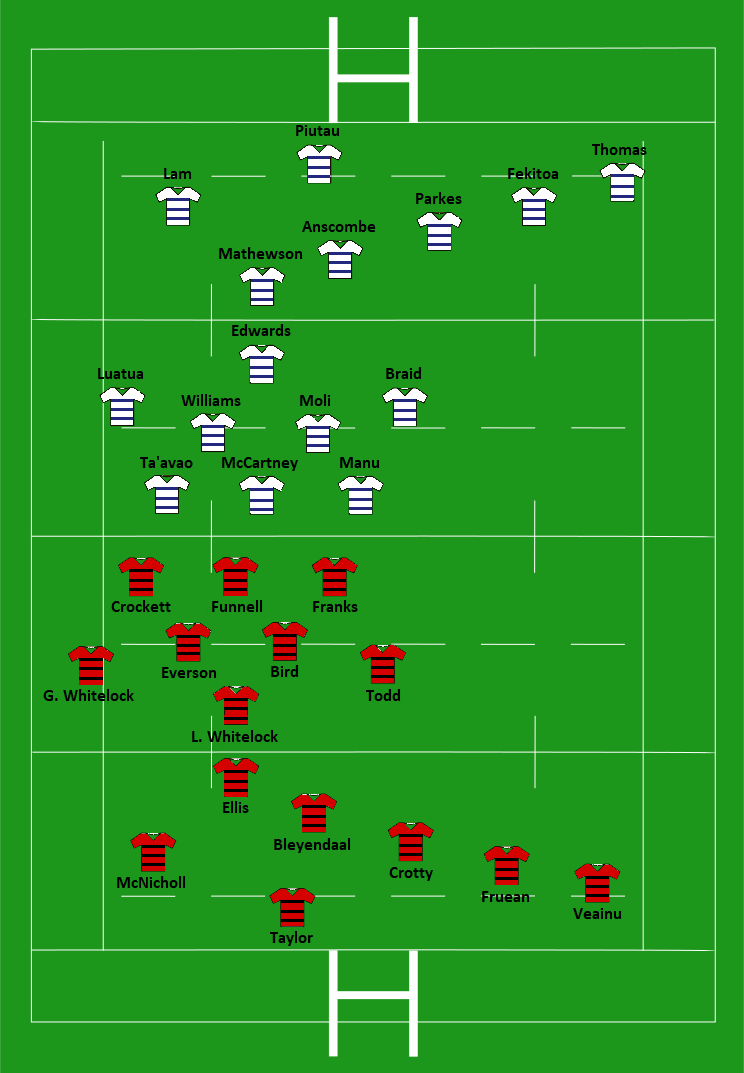

| FB | 15 | Charles Piutau |
| RW | 14 | Ben Lam |
| OC | 13 | Malakai Fekitoa |
| IC | 12 | Hadleigh Parkes |
| LW | 11 | Dave Thomas | (substituted off) 58' |
| FH | 10 | Gareth Anscombe |
| SH | 9 | Alby Mathewson | (substituted off) 66' |
| N8 | 8 | Joe Edwards | (substituted off) 42' |
| OF | 7 | Daniel Braid (c) |
| BF | 6 | Steven Luatua |
| RL | 5 | Ali Williams | (substituted off) 67' |
| LL | 4 | Liaki Moli | (substituted off) 63' |
| TP | 3 | Angus Ta'avao | (substituted off) 40' | (substituted on) 65' |
| HK | 2 | Tom McCartney | (substituted off) 74' |
| LP | 1 | Pauliasi Manu | | (substituted off) 65' |
Replacements:
| HK | 16 | Nathan Vella | (substituted on) 74' |
| PR | 17 | Charlie Faumuina | (substituted on) 40' |
| LK | 18 | Andrew van der Heijden | (substituted on) 67' |
| FL | 19 | Sean Polwart | (substituted on) 42' |
| FL | 20 | Nathan Hughes | (substituted on) 63' |
| FH | 21 | Simon Hickey | (substituted on) 66' |
| WG | 22 | Lolagi Visinia | (substituted on) 58' |

== Statistics ==
=== Leading point scorers ===
| No. | Player | Team | Points | Average | Details |
|---|---|---|---|---|---|
| 1 | Gareth Anscombe | Auckland | 191 | 15.92 | 4 T, 30 C, 37 P, 0 D |
| 2 | Tom Taylor | Canterbury | 182 | 15.17 | 2 T, 41 C, 30 P, 0 D |
| 3 | Baden Kerr | Counties Manukau | 138 | 13.80 | 2 T, 25 C, 26 P, 0 D |
| 4 | Hayden Parker | Otago | 129 | 10.75 | 0 T, 18 C, 31 P, 0 D |
| 5 | Jason Woodward | Wellington | 120 | 12.00 | 5 T, 25 C, 15 P, 0 D |
| 6 | Trent Renata | Waikato | 107 | 10.70 | 1 T, 21 C, 20 P, 0 D |
| 7 | Frazier Climo | Taranaki | 91 | 11.38 | 4 T, 13 C, 15 P, 0 D |
| 8 | Ash Moeke | Northland | 85 | 9.44 | 1 T, 13 C, 18 P, 0 D |
| 9 | Nick McCashin | Bay of Plenty | 79 | 7.90 | 2 T, 12 C, 15 P, 0 D |
| 10 | Scott Eade | Southland | 78 | 8.67 | 0 T, 9 C, 20 P, 0 D |

Source: The weekly reviews of the matches published on provincial.rugby (see "Report" in the individual match scoring stats).

=== Leading try scorers ===
| No. | Player | Team | Tries | Average |
|---|---|---|---|---|
| 1 | Johnny McNicholl | Canterbury | 10 | 0.91 |
| 2 | Ardie Savea | Wellington | 7 | 0.70 |
| 3 | Kurt Baker | Taranaki | 7 | 0.64 |
| 4 | Charles Piutau | Auckland | 7 | 0.58 |
| 5 | Sherwin Stowers | Counties Manukau | 7 | 0.58 |
| 6 | Telusa Veainu | Canterbury | 7 | 0.58 |
| 7 | Peter Betham | Tasman | 6 | 0.55 |
| 8 | Tim Nanai-Williams | Counties Manukau | 6 | 0.55 |
| 9 | Bundee Aki | Counties Manukau | 6 | 0.50 |
| 10 | Tony Ensor | Otago | 6 | 0.50 |

Source: The weekly reviews of the matches published on provincial.rugby (see "Report" in the individual match scoring stats).

=== Points by week ===
| Team | 1 | | 2 | | 3 | | 4 | | 5 | | 6 | | 7 | | 8 | | Total | | Average | |
|---|---|---|---|---|---|---|---|---|---|---|---|---|---|---|---|---|---|---|---|---|
| Auckland | 36 | 29 | 70 | 49 | 32 | 22 | 16 | 37 | 86 | 62 | 22 | 18 | 36 | 16 | 24 | 19 | 322 | 252 | 32.20 | 25.20 |
| Bay of Plenty | 22 | 37 | 31 | 19 | 13 | 47 | 43 | 31 | 41 | 42 | 57 | 55 | 3 | 17 | 22 | 63 | 232 | 311 | 23.20 | 31.10 |
| Canterbury | 22 | 25 | 69 | 14 | 20 | 12 | 9 | 18 | 52 | 27 | 84 | 0 | 56 | 11 | 107 | 25 | 419 | 132 | 41.90 | 13.20 |
| Counties Manukau | 30 | 9 | 30 | 37 | 74 | 28 | 43 | 12 | 31 | 28 | 18 | 22 | 28 | 32 | 63 | 59 | 317 | 227 | 31.70 | 22.70 |
| Hawke's Bay | 29 | 36 | 52 | 60 | 6 | 22 | 7 | 35 | 42 | 41 | 21 | 15 | 7 | 20 | 6 | 72 | 170 | 301 | 21.70 | 30.10 |
| Manawatu | 11 | 30 | 16 | 59 | 36 | 47 | 23 | 20 | 28 | 31 | 18 | 59 | 55 | 58 | 11 | 17 | 198 | 334 | 19.80 | 33.40 |
| North Harbour | 22 | 42 | 3 | 36 | 32 | 45 | 20 | 23 | 42 | 81 | 28 | 34 | 16 | 36 | 42 | 10 | 205 | 307 | 20.50 | 30.70 |
| Northland | 34 | 46 | 29 | 27 | 38 | 50 | 20 | 17 | 31 | 32 | 31 | 47 | 11 | 56 | 31 | 44 | 225 | 319 | 22.50 | 31.90 |
| Otago | 46 | 34 | 19 | 31 | 15 | 10 | 12 | 43 | 93 | 38 | 15 | 21 | 73 | 84 | 19 | 24 | 292 | 285 | 29.20 | 28.50 |
| Southland | 9 | 30 | 8 | 40 | 10 | 15 | 45 | 20 | 27 | 17 | 16 | 96 | 18 | 47 | 17 | 11 | 150 | 276 | 15.00 | 27.60 |
| Taranaki | 37 | 22 | 49 | 40 | 22 | 6 | 18 | 9 | 64 | 74 | 59 | 18 | 57 | 64 | 17 | 33 | 323 | 266 | 32.30 | 26.60 |
| Tasman | 25 | 22 | 40 | 49 | 27 | 3 | 30 | 30 | 13 | 39 | 19 | 20 | 17 | 3 | 38 | 61 | 209 | 227 | 20.90 | 22.70 |
| Waikato | 42 | 22 | 27 | 29 | 22 | 32 | 28 | 35 | 27 | 52 | 20 | 19 | 78 | 38 | 28 | 3 | 272 | 230 | 27.20 | 23.00 |
| Wellington | 30 | 11 | 70 | 23 | 12 | 20 | 29 | 13 | 30 | 43 | 70 | 54 | 49 | 22 | 33 | 17 | 323 | 203 | 32.30 | 20.30 |

Source: ITM Cup Fixtures and Results 2012

=== Tries by week ===
| Team | 1 | | 2 | | 3 | | 4 | | 5 | | 6 | | 7 | | 8 | | Total | | Average | |
|---|---|---|---|---|---|---|---|---|---|---|---|---|---|---|---|---|---|---|---|---|
| Auckland | 3 | 2 | 9 | 4 | 4 | 3 | 1 | 4 | 8 | 9 | 1 | 0 | 5 | 1 | 2 | 1 | 33 | 24 | 3.30 | 2.40 |
| Bay of Plenty | 3 | 4 | 3 | 1 | 2 | 5 | 4 | 1 | 5 | 5 | 6 | 6 | 0 | 2 | 3 | 8 | 26 | 32 | 2.60 | 3.20 |
| Canterbury | 1 | 3 | 8 | 1 | 3 | 2 | 0 | 2 | 6 | 3 | 12 | 0 | 7 | 1 | 14 | 3 | 51 | 15 | 5.10 | 1.50 |
| Counties Manukau | 4 | 0 | 3 | 3 | 9 | 4 | 5 | 0 | 4 | 3 | 0 | 1 | 4 | 4 | 7 | 8 | 36 | 23 | 3.60 | 2.30 |
| Hawke's Bay | 2 | 3 | 5 | 7 | 0 | 3 | 1 | 4 | 5 | 5 | 0 | 0 | 1 | 2 | 0 | 9 | 14 | 33 | 1.40 | 3.30 |
| Manawatu | 1 | 3 | 1 | 8 | 4 | 6 | 2 | 3 | 3 | 4 | 2 | 8 | 6 | 7 | 1 | 2 | 20 | 41 | 2.00 | 4.10 |
| North Harbour | 3 | 6 | 0 | 5 | 4 | 4 | 3 | 2 | 5 | 8 | 4 | 5 | 1 | 5 | 5 | 1 | 25 | 36 | 2.50 | 3.60 |
| Northland | 4 | 4 | 3 | 3 | 2 | 6 | 2 | 1 | 4 | 2 | 5 | 5 | 1 | 7 | 5 | 6 | 26 | 34 | 2.60 | 3.40 |
| Otago | 4 | 4 | 1 | 3 | 0 | 1 | 0 | 5 | 11 | 5 | 0 | 0 | 9 | 11 | 1 | 2 | 26 | 31 | 2.60 | 3.10 |
| Southland | 0 | 4 | 1 | 5 | 1 | 0 | 5 | 3 | 2 | 2 | 1 | 14 | 2 | 5 | 2 | 1 | 14 | 34 | 1.40 | 3.40 |
| Taranaki | 4 | 3 | 5 | 5 | 3 | 0 | 2 | 0 | 7 | 8 | 8 | 2 | 6 | 9 | 3 | 4 | 38 | 31 | 3.80 | 3.10 |
| Tasman | 3 | 1 | 5 | 5 | 4 | 0 | 3 | 3 | 2 | 5 | 1 | 2 | 2 | 0 | 4 | 6 | 24 | 22 | 2.40 | 2.20 |
| Waikato | 6 | 3 | 3 | 3 | 3 | 4 | 1 | 4 | 3 | 6 | 2 | 1 | 11 | 5 | 3 | 0 | 32 | 26 | 3.20 | 2.60 |
| Wellington | 3 | 1 | 9 | 3 | 2 | 3 | 4 | 1 | 4 | 4 | 8 | 6 | 7 | 3 | 4 | 3 | 41 | 24 | 4.10 | 2.40 |

| For | Against |

Source: The weekly reviews of the matches published on provincial.rugby (see "Report" in the individual match scoring stats).

=== Sanctions ===
| Player | Team | Red | Yellow | Sent off match(es): |
|---|---|---|---|---|
| Willie Rickards | Taranaki | 0 | 1 | vs Bay of Plenty |
| Samisoni Fisilau | Northland | 0 | 1 | vs Otago |
| TJ Ioane | Otago | 0 | 1 | vs Bay of Plenty |
| Kendrick Lynn | Bay of Plenty | 0 | 1 | vs Otago |
| Simon Lemalu | Counties Manukau | 0 | 1 | vs Hawke's Bay |
| Sam Christie | Waikato | 0 | 1 | vs Northland |
| Vernon Fredericks | Tasman | 0 | 1 | vs Taranaki |
| Bundee Aki | Counties Manukau | 0 | 1 | vs North Harbour |
| Justin Davies | Northland | 0 | 1 | vs Manawatu |
| Bryce Williams | Northland | 0 | 1 | vs Manawatu |
| Rob Verbakel | Otago | 0 | 1 | vs Southland |
| Filo Paulo | North Harbour | 0 | 1 | vs Northland |
| Piers Francis | Waikato | 0 | 1 | vs Bay of Plenty |
| Tanerau Latimer | Bay of Plenty | 0 | 1 | vs Hawke's Bay |
| Eric Sione | Wellington | 0 | 1 | vs Auckland |
| Johnny McNicholl | Canterbury | 0 | 1 | vs Waikato |
| Jeremy Thrush | Wellington | 0 | 1 | vs Bay of Plenty |
| Mahonri Schwalger | Counties Manukau | 0 | 1 | vs Auckland |
| Sean Brookman | Auckland | 0 | 1 | vs Counties Manukau |
| Jack Ram | Northland | 0 | 1 | vs Bay of Plenty |
| Tawera Kerr-Barlow | Waikato | 0 | 1 | vs Taranaki |
| Hugh Blake | Otago | 0 | 1 | vs Auckland |
| Liaki Moli | Auckland | 0 | 1 | vs Otago |
| Maama Vaipulu | Counties Manukau | 0 | 1 | vs Northland |
| Maselino Paulino | Hawke's Bay | 0 | 1 | vs Waikato |
| Jarrad Hoeata | Taranaki | 0 | 1 | vs Wellington |
| Filipo Levi | Tasman | 0 | 1 | vs Otago |
| Telusa Veainu | Canterbury | 0 | 1 | vs Wellington |

== Ranfurly Shield ==
=== Pre-season challenges ===
27 July 2012
14:05 NZST

| Taranaki | 67–16 | King Country |
| Try: Naholo (2) 2' c, 28' c Cameron (2) 17' c, 44' c Hayward 39' c Rickards 55' c Lewis 62' m Baker (2) 65' c, 80' m Hall 77' m Con: Cameron (7/8) 4', 18', 29', 40', 45', 57', 65'; Marshall (0/2); Pen: Cameron (1/1) 10' | Preview; Report | Try: Olsen 66' c Con: Strachan (1/1) 66'; Pen: Strachan (3/3) 24', 34', 48' |

TET Stadium & Events Centre, Inglewood
Attendance: 6,500
Referee: Ben Skeen

5 August 2012
NZST

| Taranaki | 51–7 | Wanganui |
| Try: Climo (2) 18' m, 68' c Gibson-Park (2) 42' c, 53' c Naholo 49' c Hoeata 65' c Barrett 75' m Con: Climo (4/5) 43', 51', 53', 66'; Cameron (1/2) 69'; Pen: Climo (2/4) 27', 35' | Preview; Report | Try: Baldwin 60' c Con: Davis (1/1) 62'; Cards: Smyth (yellow card) 31' |

Yarrow Stadium, New Plymouth
Attendance: 8,000
Referee: Nick Briant

== See also ==
- 2012 Heartland Championship
