= Jason Woodward =

NZ rugby union player

- Full name: Jason Christopher Woodward
- Born: 17 May 1990 (age 36) Lower Hutt, New Zealand
- Height: 188 cm (6 ft 2 in)
- Weight: 100 kg (220 lb; 15 st 10 lb)
- School: St Patrick's College, Silverstream
- University: Hartpury College

Rugby union career
- Position(s): Full-back, Wing, Centre
Senior career
Years	Team	Apps	(Points)
2009–2016	Wellington	38	(267)
2013–2014	Rebels	26	(210)
2015–2016	Hurricanes	18	(42)
2016–2017	Bristol	17	(91)
2017–2022	Gloucester	55	(80)
2022–2023	Sale Sharks	2	(0)
- Correct as of 12 February 2023
International career
Years	Team	Apps	(Points)
2010	New Zealand U20	4	(0)
- Correct as of 25 May 2019

Jason Christopher Woodward (born 17 May 1990) is a New Zealand former rugby union player who played full-back.

== Early career ==
Woodward played for the Upper Hutt Premier team, and was a regular in the Upper Hutt Leader. In 2010, Woodward made the New Zealand U20s and represented New Zealand at the 2010 IRB Junior World Championship in Argentina, helping the team to win the competition undefeated.

== Career ==
=== Wellington ===
Woodward played his first provincial season with the Wellington Lions in 2011. On debut he scored all of Wellington Lions' three tries to beat Taranaki 23–5 in the 2011 season's opening game.

=== Rebels ===
Woodward joined the Melbourne Rebels following a strong 2012 ITM Cup campaign with the Wellington Lions. However an injury sustained pre-season delayed his debut until round six of the 2013 Super Rugby season. Woodward made his debut in an unfortunate 64–7 belting from the Sharks in Durban. He started at outside centre. Back in Australia for round eight in Perth, Woodward started on the right wing against the Western Force. He scored his first and second tries in Super Rugby and helped the Rebels win 30–23.

=== Hurricanes ===
June 2014, Woodward joined the Hurricanes after signing a two-year deal to return to his home franchise. The then 24-year-old returned to Wellington at the end of the 2014 Super Rugby competition ending a two-season stint with the Melbourne Rebels. Woodward's Super Rugby season would be soon over after he broke his ankle playing club rugby in Wellington. He suffered the injury when he was caught between two defenders while playing at centre for club side Upper Hutt against Oriental Rongotai at the Polo Ground in Miramar. Woodward had been used only sparingly by the Hurricanes throughout the 2015 season with just three appearances, but had been in good form since starting the opening two matches in South Africa against the Lions and Bulls. With Nehe Milner-Skudder and James Marshall also used at fullback, Woodward's only other appearance had been against his former team the Rebels at Westpac Stadium in round seven.

=== Bristol Rugby ===
On 12 September 2016 it was announced that Woodward had signed a two-year deal with Premiership Rugby club Bristol.

=== Gloucester Rugby ===
Following Bristol Rugby's relegation at the end of the 2016-17 Premiership season it was reported Woodward had a relegation clause in his contract, which was activated by Gloucester Rugby, where Woodward would link up with some of his former Hartpury College friends. In May 2017 Woodward was invited to a training camp with the senior England squad by coach Eddie Jones although he did not play against the Barbarians.

In his first season at the club Woodward started in the 2017–18 European Rugby Challenge Cup final which saw Gloucester defeated by Cardiff Blues to finish runners up. He was included in the England squad for their 2018 tour of South Africa although ultimately did not make an appearance.

=== Sale Sharks ===
After his release from Gloucester, Woodward signed for Premiership rivals Sale Sharks for the 2022–23 season. His last appearance for the club saw him start in their 2022–23 Premiership Rugby Cup semi-final defeat against Exeter Chiefs. In May 2023 it was announced that Woodward had left Sale.

== Personal life ==
Woodward's father Glen was a loose forward for Hutt Old Boys in the 1980s before arthritis cut his career short, while brothers Aidan and Jared are both making names for themselves with the Upper Hutt Rams. He spent two years in England on exchange at Hartpury College, however he left early to further his rugby career in New Zealand and therefore has no formal qualifications, unlike his sister who is a former New Zealand Fencing Champion and is University educated. He also studied to become a commercial helicopter pilot. In his spare time he enjoys driving monster trucks.
