= Rob Verbakel =

- Born: 13 May 1987 (age 39) Nelson, New Zealand
- Height: 1.95 m (6 ft 5 in)
- Weight: 110 kg (17 st 5 lb; 243 lb)

Rugby union career
- Position: Lock
Amateur team(s)
Years	Team	Apps	(Points)
- RC 't Gooi
Senior career
Years	Team	Apps	(Points)
2011-2012	Glasgow Warriors	10	(0)
2013-2014	Northampton Saints		
Provincial / State sides
Years	Team	Apps	(Points)
2010	Canterbury	9	(0)
2011-2012	Otago	21	(10)
International career
Years	Team	Apps	(Points)
2016-	Netherlands		

Rob Verbakel (born 13 May 1987 in Nelson, New Zealand) is a former Netherlands international rugby union player. He previously played as a lock in the Dutch league Ereklasse for RC 't Gooi. . Prior to this, he played for Glasgow Warriors in the Pro12; and in the English league Aviva Premiership for the Northampton Saints.

Verbakel is currently employed as a Project Manager at global consultancy, TSA Riley.

== Rugby Union career ==
=== Professional Rugby Union career ===
==== New Zealand ====
A late starter to rugby, Verbakel only started playing at university at age 19. However, he quickly showed his talent and after only 3 years of playing at lock was selected to the Canterbury squad for the 2010 ITM Cup, making 9 appearances.

For the 2011 ITM Cup, Verbakel transferred to Otago. He made his debut in the season-opener against North Harbour, coming off the bench for the 2nd half and scoring his first provincial try.

After a stint in Scotland, he returned to Otago for the 2012 ITM Cup, and started 11 matches for the province.

==== Europe ====
Verbakel signed in Scotland with Glasgow Warriors of the Pro12 for the 2011-12 season. He made 10 appearances for the side including 6 starts before returning to New Zealand.

For the 2013-14 season, Verbakel signed with Northampton Saints, signing for the club at the same time as Otago teammate Glenn Dickson.

He is currently playing in the Dutch Ereklasse (top league) for t’ Gooi.

=== International Rugby Union career ===
He made his international debut for the Netherlands on 5 November 2016 against Ukraine.

== Professional Corporate Career ==
=== Project Management career ===
Verbakel has transitioned to a professional career in Project Management, joining the global consultancy TSA Riley in April 2023. He notably led the Dress-Smart Hornby Shopping Centre structural strengthening and redevelopment.
