= Matt Faddes =

New Zealand rugby union player

- Full name: Matthew Faddes
- Born: 6 November 1991 (age 35) Balclutha, New Zealand
- Height: 1.85 m (6 ft 1 in)
- Weight: 93 kg (205 lb; 14.6 st)
- School: South Otago High School

Rugby union career
- Position: Outside Back / Midfield
- Current team: Otago
Senior career
Years	Team	Apps	(Points)
2011−2019	Otago	48	(85)
2016−2019	Highlanders	43	(95)
2019–2021	Ulster	27	(45)
2021-	Otago		
- Correct as of 6 June 2021
International career
Years	Team	Apps	(Points)
2012−2013	New Zealand 7's	3	(17)
- Correct as of 18 December 2019

Matt Faddes (born 6 November 1991) is a New Zealand rugby union player who currently plays as a centre, wing or fullback for Otago.

== Early career ==
Born in the town of Balclutha, located halfway between Dunedin and Invercargill on New Zealand's South Island, Faddes was educated at South Otago High School in his hometown.

== Professional career ==
Faddes first played provincial rugby for Otago in 2011 ITM Cup, debuting against North Harbour. He made two appearances in total in 2011 and two more the following year before playing 7 times and scoring 2 tries in 2013 to help the Razorbacks finish 2nd on the Championship log and reach the playoff semi-finals where his 12th minute try was unable to stop them from bowing out 24-29 at home to Hawke's Bay.

He only saw action once in 2014, but in 2015 his career in the 15-man game really began to take off. Having previously played mostly as an outside back, he largely featured as a centre for Otago in 2015 and it was a move that paid off with him scoring 6 tries in 10 games as they reached the Championship playoffs before being comprehensively defeated by Wellington. He continued to be a key player for the Razorbacks in 2016, contributing 3 tries in 11 games as the men from Dunedin topped the Championship standings before surprisingly losing at home by North Harbour in the play off final, a defeat which consigned them to another season of Championship rugby in 2017.

Following the unfortunate defeat Faddes decided to try his hand at a different field, Accounting at the University of Otago.

=== Super Rugby ===
Excellent showings in the midfield for Otago during the 2015 ITM Cup saw Faddes earn a Super Rugby contract with the Dunedin-based Highlanders ahead of the 2016 season. He made a dream start to life as a Super Rugby player scoring 10 tries in 16 games, including a hat-trick against the Southern Kings which put him second, behind Israel Folau of the Waratahs in the try scoring charts. His side, the Highlanders, were defending Super Rugby champions in 2016, however they were unable to hold on to their title and were eliminated by the Lions in the semi-finals, losing 42-30 with Faddes' 48th minute try scored in vain.

Tony Brown replaced the Japan-bound Jamie Joseph as Highlanders head coach ahead of the 2017 season and having worked with Faddes at provincial level, he retained him in the squad for his first year in charge.

=== Move to Ulster ===
Faddes moved to Northern Ireland to join Ulster ahead of the 2019–20 season, and has played both in the Pro14 and European Rugby Champions Cup.

Faddes returned to Otago in 2021.

== International ==
Faddes was an All Blacks Sevens representative in 2013, helping them to victory in the 2013 London Sevens and playing in 3 competitions in total throughout the season.

On 5 November 2016, Faddes featured in the number 14 jersey for the Barbarians in their 31-31 draw against South Africa at Wembley Stadium. He was replaced by Australian Luke Morahan in the 51st minute of the match.

== Career honours ==
All Blacks Sevens

- IRB Sevens World Series 2012–13

== Super Rugby statistics ==
As of 14 May 2019

Season	Team	Games	Starts	Sub	Mins	Tries	Cons	Pens	Drops	Points	Yel	Red
2016	Highlanders	16	13	3	1043	10	0	0	0	50	1	0
2017	Highlanders	11	5	6	574	6	0	0	0	30	1	0
2018	Highlanders	8	1	7	204	0	0	0	0	0	0	0
2019	Highlanders	8	7	1	555	3	0	0	0	15	0	0
Total		43	26	17	2376	19	0	0	0	95	2	0
