= Justin Davies =

Justin Davies may refer to:

- Justin Davies (actor) (born 1996), Welsh actor
- Justin Davies (footballer) (born 1983), Australian rules footballer
- Justin Davies (rugby union) (born 1986), New Zealand rugby union player
- Justin Davies (runner) (born 2003), Welsh middle-distance runner
- Justin Davies, candidate in the 2007 National Assembly for Wales election
- Justin Davies, a character in The Secret Life of Us
- Justin Davies, a character in Queerspiracy, played by Matthew Shaffer

== See also ==
- Justin Davis (disambiguation)
