= Tony Ensor =

Tony Ensor may refer to:

- Tony Ensor (rugby union, born 1949), Ireland rugby union player
- Tony Ensor (rugby union, born 1991), New Zealand rugby union player
