= Bryn Hall (rugby union) =

New Zealand rugby union player

- Full name: Bryn Desmond Hall
- Born: 3 February 1992 (age 34) Auckland, New Zealand
- Height: 183 cm (6 ft 0 in)
- Weight: 93 kg (205 lb; 14 st 9 lb)
- School: St. Peter's College

Rugby union career
- Position: Half-back
Senior career
Years	Team	Apps	(Points)
2012–2021, 2024, 2026	North Harbour	104	(104)
2013–2016	Blues	32	(15)
2017–2022	Crusaders	94	(94)
2022–2024	Shizuoka Blue Revs	28	(42)
2024–2026	Kubota Spears	26	(5)
- Correct as of 11 November 2024
International career
Years	Team	Apps	(Points)
2012	New Zealand U20	4	(0)
2017–2022	Māori All Blacks	8	(10)
2019	Barbarian F.C.	2	(0)
- Correct as of 11 November 2024

Bryn Desmond Hall (born 3 February 1992) is a New Zealand rugby union player who currently plays as a halfback for Kubota Spears Funabashi Tokyo Bay in the Japan Rugby League One. He previously played for North Harbour in New Zealand's domestic Bunnings NPC competition and the Crusaders in Super Rugby.

== Early career ==
Born and raised in Auckland, he was educated at St Peter's College where he played first XV rugby, captaining them in his senior year in 2010. After graduation, he went on to play club rugby for Northcote in North Harbour's club rugby competition.

== Senior career ==
Hall broke into the North Harbour team during the 2012 ITM Cup while aged just 20. He played 9 times for the men from Auckland's North Shore and scored 35 points which included 3 tries as they finished bottom the Championship log with just 1 win in 10 games. 2013 saw him establish himself as the province's first choice halfback, playing in all 10 of their games during the season as they once again finished in last place.

2014 saw some improvement from Harbour as they finished 5th out of 7 teams in the ITM Cup Championship and Hall continued to be first pick in the number 9 jersey, playing 9 times. He was named as team captain and was an ever present in 2015 as Harbour once again finished in 5th place, just outside the promotion play-off places.

The arrival of veteran halfback, Chris Smylie for the 2016 season provided Hall will some stiff competition for a starting place for the first time in several years, however, he rose to the challenge, playing in all 12 of Harbour's matches, starting 8 times as they earned promotion to the Mitre 10 Cup Premiership for 2017 with an upset victory away to Otago in the Championship final.

== Super Rugby ==
Strong performances in an under-performing North Harbour side in 2012 brought him to the attention of local Super Rugby franchise, the Blues who named him in their squad for the 2013 Super Rugby season. He made his Super Rugby debut in Round 2 of the season, coming on as a 63rd minute replacement in the 34–15 win over the Crusaders at Eden Park, however that would turn out to be his only appearance for the year as a broken jaw and glandular fever ensured that he found himself third in the pecking order for the halfback jersey behind All Black Piri Weepu and Taranaki's Jamison Gibson-Park.

In 2014, he earned a lot more game time and had nailed down the starting halfback spot for the Blues by the end of the season, dislodging the far more experienced Weepu. However, all the momentum he'd built up through 2014 was lost when a broken foot picked up playing club rugby forced him to miss the entire 2015 campaign, but, fully fit in 2016, new head-coach Tana Umaga made him the franchise's first choice number 9 once more and he went on to play in all 15 of their matches during a slightly disappointing season which ended with them in 11th place in the overall standings.

In June 2016, it was announced that Hall would move south to join the Christchurch-based Crusaders for 2017 where he would compete with former New Zealand under-20 international Mitchell Drummond for a starting berth in the wake of the departure of the experienced Andy Ellis.

== International ==
Hall was a New Zealand Schools representative in 2010 and then along with future Blues team-mate Steve Luatua, went on to co-captain the New Zealand Under-20 side which finished as runner-up in the 2012 IRB Junior World Championship in South Africa.

== Career honours ==
North Harbour

- Mitre 10 Cup Championship – 2016

== Super Rugby statistics ==
As of 23 December 2016

Season	Team	Games	Starts	Sub	Mins	Tries	Cons	Pens	Drops	Points	Yel	Red
2013	Blues	1	0	1	17	0	0	0	0	0	0	0
2014	Blues	16	11	5	835	2	0	0	0	10	0	0
2015	Blues	0	0	0	16	0	0	0	0	0	0	0
2016	Blues	15	12	3	802	1	0	0	0	5	0	0
Total		32	23	9	1670	3	0	0	0	15	0	0

== Personal life ==
Hall is a New Zealander of Māori descent (Ngāti Ranginui descent).

== Controversy ==
Hall while on Sky Sports show "Kick off" referred to fellow Crusader teammate Jack Goodhue as "a Jew" for attempting to get a women's magazine to pay for his wedding. These comments were labelled as "casual racism" by the BSA but the slur was not serious enough to warrant a breach of broadcasting standards
