= South Otago High School =

Location
- Frances Street, Rosebank, Balclutha, New Zealand; 46.2469°S 169.7278°E

Information
- Type: State, Co-educational, Secondary (Year 9–13)
- Motto: Latin: Fide et Fortitudine ((By Faith and Fortitude))
- Established: 1926
- Ministry of Education Institution no.: 393
- Principal: Mike Wright
- Enrolment: 498 (July 2026)
- Socio-economic decile: 6N
- Website: sohs.school.nz

South Otago High School is situated in Balclutha, Otago, in the South Island of New Zealand. It is the largest school in the South Otago region. The country's second longest river, the Clutha River, marks the northeastern boundary of the School's grounds.

The school has a strong rivalry with the smaller but older Tokomairiro High School in the neighbouring town of Milton. Links with the past at the school include a stand of oak trees, which dominate the school's grounds. These were already several decades old at the time of the school's founding. One of these oaks is commemorated on the school's arms, along with the Southern Cross. These two symbols also represent strength and a striving for higher ideals, also reflected in the school's motto of Fide et Fortitudine.

== History ==
Founded in 1926, the school is one of the South Island's oldest non-urban full secondary schools. At its opening, the school roll was 135, and the school initially shared classrooms with other nearby schools until the completion of its own building – now the school's main block – on 5 hectares of land in 1927. The school's first rector was John Reid, who held the post until 1931. From the following year, J. Garfield Anderson became rector, a post he held until 1954, during which time the school grew greatly in both size and scope.

== The school today ==
South Otago High School is a co-educational high school with a roll of 580 students, of whom some 15% are Māori. Facilities include several computer rooms, two gymnasia – one with squash courts and fitness room, art, music, and technology suites, and science laboratories. The school also boasts 17 hectares of superb sporting fields and courts.

In 2002 there was a small outbreak of group C meningococcal disease in Balclutha, and students at this school and at Rosebank Primary School were vaccinated against the disease.

In April 2006, South Otago High School became the first New Zealand school to run a Jeans for Genes day in aid of the Haemophilia Foundation of New Zealand. Jeans for Genes, a charitable event originating in the United Kingdom, sees schools raising funds to help children with genetic disorders through sponsored events on a day on which school uniform is temporarily replaced by the wearing of denim jeans.

In September 2008 new principal Nick Simpson reopened plans to establish an area computing facility.

== Enrolment ==
As of July 2026, the school has roll of 498 students, of which 85 (17.1%) identify as Māori.

As of 2026, the school has an Equity Index of 475, placing it amongst schools whose students have above average socioeconomic barriers to achievement (roughly equivalent to decile 4 under the former socio-economic decile system).

== Notable alumni ==
- Sir Ronald Algie – politician
- Lee Allan – Otago rugby player
- Tony Brown – All Blacks rugby player
- Kelvin Deaker – international rugby referee
- Tony Ensor – Otago rugby player, NZ sevens rugby player, Highlanders
- Matt Faddes – Otago rugby player, NZ sevens rugby player, Highlanders
- Paul Grant – Otago rugby player, All Blacks Sevens player
- Bill Manhire – writer
- Rachel Pullar – cricketer
- Sarah Tsukigawa – cricketer
- Robert Webster – virologist and global influenza expert
- Charles Willocks – All Blacks rugby player
- Debbie White - Silver Fern netball
