= Shaun Treeby =

NZ rugby union player

- Born: 26 January 1989 (age 37) New Plymouth, New Zealand
- Height: 1.76 m (5 ft 9 1/2 in)
- Weight: 90 kg (14 st 2 lb)

Rugby union career
- Position: Centre
Senior career
Years	Team	Apps	(Points)
2018–2021	Honda Heat	29	(15)
- Correct as of 21 February 2021
Provincial / State sides
Years	Team	Apps	(Points)
2009–2016	Wellington	66	(65)
2017	North Harbour	5	(0)
- Correct as of 21 February 2021
Super Rugby
Years	Team	Apps	(Points)
2011–2015	Highlanders	49	(40)
2017	Stormers	4	(0)
- Correct as of 18 April 2018
International career
Years	Team	Apps	(Points)
2009	New Zealand U20	5	(20)
- Correct as of 21 February 2021

Shaun Treeby (born 26 January 1989) is a New Zealand rugby union player. He plays his provincial rugby for North Harbour in the Mitre 10 Cup.

== Playing career ==
=== Provincial Rugby ===
Treeby came up through age group levels for Wellington and made his full provincial debut in 2009. By the 2010 ITM Cup, he was a fixture for Wellington, making 10 starts and scoring his first two provincial tries. He plays centre.

=== Super Rugby ===
Treeby signed with the Highlanders for the 2011 Super Rugby season, following his former Wellington coach Jamie Joseph south. He quickly established himself as a key member of the squad, starting each of the team's first 8 games and forming an excellent partnership with Kendrick Lynn, before suffering a knee injury. He returned from injury to start the final four matches of the season, and scored his first Super Rugby try against the Lions on 28 May.

On 3 April 2017, it was announced that Treeby would join South African Super Rugby side the Stormers on a four-month deal.
