= Charles Willocks =

New Zealand rugby union player

- Born: 28 June 1919 Balclutha, New Zealand
- Died: 25 August 1991 (aged 72) Balclutha, New Zealand
- Height: 1.85 m (6 ft 1 in)
- Weight: 90 kg (200 lb)
- School: South Otago High School

Rugby union career
- Position: Lock
Provincial / State sides
Years	Team	Apps	(Points)
1944–48	Otago		
International career
Years	Team	Apps	(Points)
1946–49	New Zealand	5	(0)

Charles Willocks (28 June 1919 – 25 August 1991) was a New Zealand rugby union player. A lock, Willocks represented Otago at a provincial level, and was a member of the New Zealand national side, the All Blacks, from 1946 to 1949. He played 22 matches for the All Blacks including five internationals.
