= Ross Wright (rugby union) =

- Born: Ross Gavin Wright; 25 August 1986 (age 40) New Zealand
- Height: 180 cm (5 ft 11 in)
- Weight: 116 kg (18 st 4 lb; 256 lb)
- Notable relative: Mathew Wright (brother)

Rugby union career
- Position(s): Prop, Hooker
Senior career
Years	Team	Apps	(Points)
2009–2022	Northland	123	(35)
- Correct as of 8 October 2022
Super Rugby
Years	Team	Apps	(Points)
2018	Blues	12	(0)
- Correct as of 23 August 2021
International career
Years	Team	Apps	(Points)
2017–2020	Māori All Blacks	7	(0)
- Correct as of 23 August 2021
Coaching career
- Years: Team
- 2022-Present: Northland

Ross Gavin Wright (born 25 August 1986) is a New Zealand rugby union coach and former player. Wright has played over 100 games for the Taniwha and has previously played for the Blues in 2018. He has also played for the Māori All Blacks.
