= Justin Davis =

Justin Davis may refer to:

- Justin Davis (soccer) (born 1988), American soccer player
- Justin Davis (gridiron football) (born 1995), American football player
- Justin Davis, guitarist in the country duo Striking Matches
- Justin Davis, bassist of the punk band Ceremony

== See also ==
- Justin Davies (disambiguation)
- Justine Davis, Australian politician
