= Phil Burleigh =

- Born: Phillip Daniel Burleigh; 22 October 1986 (age 40) Christchurch, New Zealand
- Height: 1.82 m (5 ft 11 1/2 in)
- Weight: 96 kg (15 st 2 lb)
- School: Shirley Boys' High School

Rugby union career
- Position(s): Second five-eighth, Fly-half
Senior career
Years	Team	Apps	(Points)
2014–2018	Edinburgh Rugby	73	(55)
2019–2024	Kyuden Voltex	44	
- Correct as of 22 February 2021
Provincial / State sides
Years	Team	Apps	(Points)
2009–2014	Bay of Plenty	42	(67)
2018	Canterbury	10	(5)
- Correct as of 22 February 2021
Super Rugby
Years	Team	Apps	(Points)
2010	Chiefs	2	(0)
2012–2014	Highlanders	34	(30)
2019	Sunwolves	7	(0)
- Correct as of 22 February 2021
International career
Years	Team	Apps	(Points)
2017	Scotland	1	(0)
- Correct as of 28 November 2021

Phillip Daniel Burleigh (born 22 October 1986) is a Scottish international rugby union player who plays for Kyuden Voltex in Japan . He previously played for Canterbury (2018), Edinburgh Rugby (2014-2018).

== Early life ==
Burleigh was born in Christchurch, New Zealand. He was educated at Shirley Boys' High School.

== Professional career ==
Burleigh represented the Highlanders in the Super Rugby competition and Bay of Plenty in the ITM Cup.

Burleigh was initially selected in the Chiefs 2012 Wider Training Group before being drafted into the Highlanders for the injured Kendrick Lynn. His first match was a week later versus the Chiefs, where he scored the match-winning try at Waikato Stadium. He missed several months while recovering from shoulder surgery, but had returned to form by 2014.

Burleigh moved to Scotland in the summer of 2014, joining Edinburgh. In February 2016 he signed a two-year contract extension.

In August 2018, Burleigh was signed to Canterbury, playing in New Zealand's provincial Mitre 10 Cup for the 2018 season.

In 2018 he signed for Sunwolves, to play in the Super Rugby competition.

== International career ==
After being domiciled in Scotland for three years, Burleigh was invited by coach Gregor Townsend to train with the Scotland squad in October 2017 ahead of the Autumn Internationals. He made his Test debut at Murrayfield against Australia, coming on as a replacement in the 53-24 victory.
