= Mathew Wright =

- Born: Mathew Kevin Wright; 3 March 1988 (age 38) Warkworth, New Zealand
- Height: 1.73 m (5 ft 8 in)
- Weight: 88 kg (194 lb; 13 st 12 lb)
- School: Rodney College
- Notable relative: Ross Wright (brother)

Rugby union career
- Position: Fullback
Provincial / State sides
Years	Team	Apps	(Points)
2012–2015, 2017–2020	Northland	56	(96)
2016–2017	RC Narbonne	7	(5)
- Correct as of 22 December 2020

Mathew Kevin Wright (born 3 March 1988) was a New Zealand rugby union who played 56 games for Northland in the National Provincial Championship between 2012 and 2020. He announced his retirement from rugby in late 2020.

He also previously played for RC Narbonne in the French Rugby Pro D2 competition.
