= Willie Rickards =

- Full name: William Tukotahi Clinton Rickards
- Born: 8 June 1984 (age 42) Rotorua, New Zealand
- Height: 189 cm (6 ft 2 in)
- Weight: 104 kg (229 lb; 16 st 5 lb)
- School: Auckland Grammar School
- University: Massey University

Rugby union career
- Position(s): Centre, wing
- Current team: Taranaki
Senior career
Years	Team	Apps	(Points)
2006–2008	Southland	27	(5)
2007	Highlanders	2	(0)
2009–2012	Taranaki	18	(10)
- Correct as of 22 April 2019
National sevens team
Years	Team		Comps
2006–2009	New Zealand		
- Correct as of 22 April 2019
Coaching career
- Years: Team
- 2015–2017: Taranaki (assistant)
- 2016–2018: New Zealand U20 (assistant)
- 2018–: Taranaki
- Correct as of 22 April 2019

William Tukotahi Clinton Rickards (born 8 June 1984 in Rotorua, New Zealand) is a New Zealand professional rugby union coach who is an assistant coach for the provincial ITM Cup side, Taranaki.

== Domestic career ==
Rickards moved south from the North Island to make his provincial debut for Southland during the 2006 Air New Zealand Cup. He spent three seasons with the province and made 31 total appearances, the majority off the bench. He also had a brief stint with the Highlanders during the 2007 Super 14 season, making two substitute appearances.

For the 2009 Air New Zealand Cup, Rickards moved back north to join Taranaki, but was ruled out for the majority of the season due to a hand injury. In August 2011, he made his first start for Taranaki since 2009 in helping the province claim the Ranfurly Shield from his former club, Southland. As well as Ranfurly Shield success, Rickards also had appearances as Taranaki captain.

== Coaching career ==
Rickards began his coaching career as a coaching development manager for the Taranaki Rugby Union. He partook in sevens coaching where he led Taranaki to their first national sevens title in Queenstown 2013. He also took the side to be 2014 semi-finalists and 2015 plate champions as well as being 2014 champions, 2013 runners-up and 2012 third-place winners in their central region sevens tournament campaigns.

Rickards earned his first fifteen aside head coaching role with the Hawera based rugby club Southern, making history with the side after leading them to their first senior A title since the club's inception in 1995. In 2015 Rickards took over as assistant coach for Taranaki in Leo Crowley's absence.
