= Dave Thomas (rugby union, born 1988) =

- Born: 14 August 1988 (age 38)
- Height: 1.87 m (6 ft 1 1/2 in)
- Weight: 98 kg (216 lb)

Rugby union career
- Position(s): Centre, Wing, Fullback
Senior career
Years	Team	Apps	(Points)
2014	Yenisey-STM	3	(20)
- Correct as of 2 August 2015
Provincial / State sides
Years	Team	Apps	(Points)
2009–12	Auckland	34	(25)
2013	Bay of Plenty	6	(5)
2015–	Northland	7	(10)
- Correct as of 12 October 2015

Dave Thomas (born 14 August 1988) is a New Zealand rugby union player. He plays in the wing (and occasionally centre or fullback) position for the provincial based ITM Cup side Northland and previously for Bay of Plenty and Auckland.
