= Adrian Barone =

New Zealand rugby union footballer

- Born: Adrian Barone; 5 May 1987 (age 39)
- Height: 1.81 m (5 ft 11 1/2 in)
- Weight: 110 kg (17 st 5 lb; 243 lb)

Rugby union career
- Position: Prop
Provincial / State sides
Years	Team	Apps	(Points)
2009−2011	Wellington		
2009	Manawatu (loan)	1	(0)
2012–14	Hawke's Bay	23	(5)
2015−	Manawatu	9	(0)
- Correct as of 12 October 2015

Adrian Barone (born 5 May 1987) is a New Zealand rugby union footballer who plays as a prop for the Hawke's Bay Magpies in the ITM Cup. His performances at domestic level have seen him named in the Crusaders Wider Training Squad for the 2013 Super Rugby season.
