= Tom Marshall (rugby union) =

NZ rugby union player

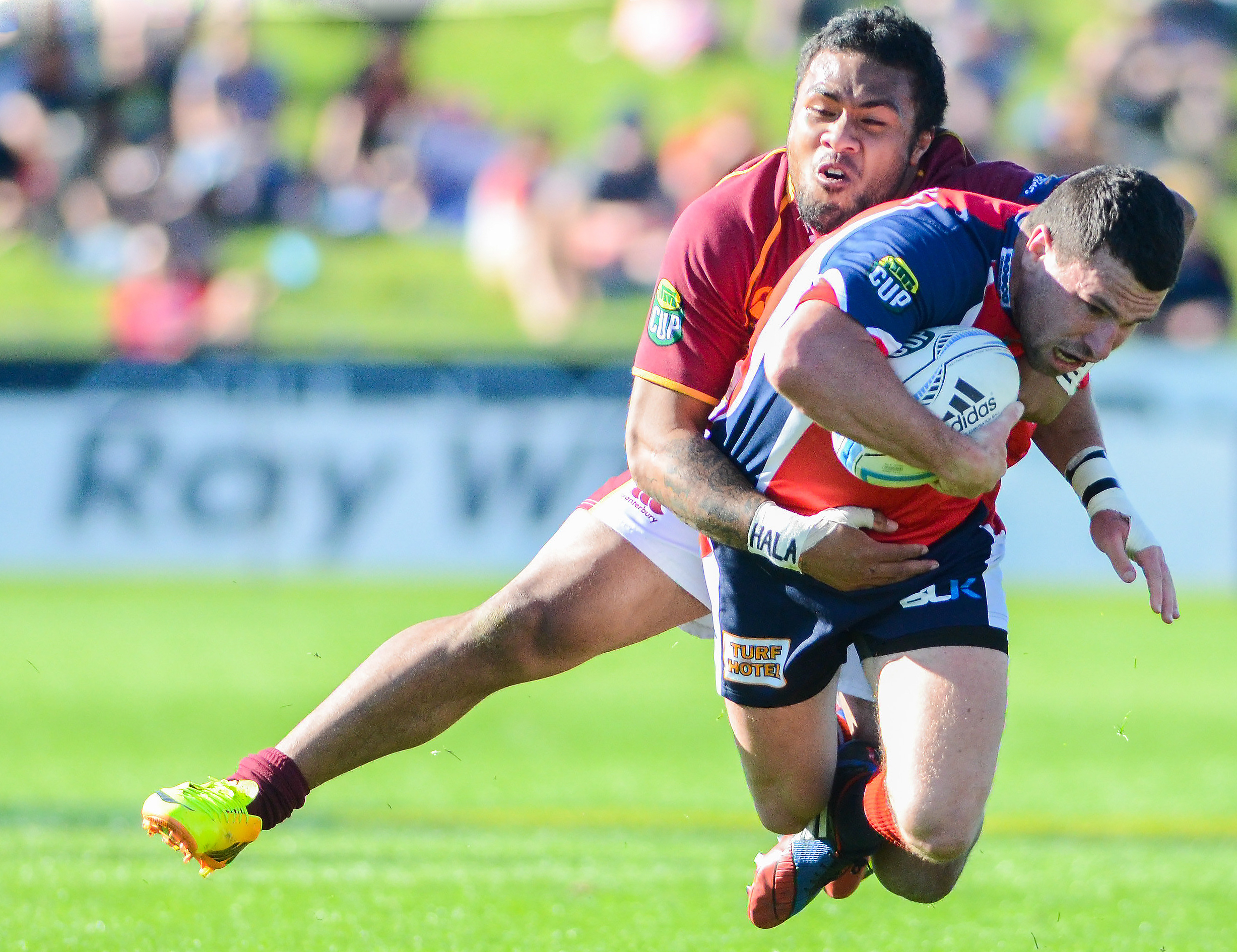
- Marshall in a tackle of a Southland player
- Born: Thomas Guthrie Marshall; 5 July 1990 (age 36) Auckland, New Zealand
- Height: 1.83 m (6 ft 0 in)
- Weight: 90 kg (14 st 2 lb)
- School: Nelson College
- Notable relative: James Marshall (brother)

Rugby union career
- Position(s): Fullback, Centre, Wing, First five-eighth
Senior career
| Years | Team | Apps | (Points) |
| 2016–2020 | Gloucester | 63 | (100) |
| 2021 | NTT DoCoMo Red Hurricanes | 5 | (10) |
| 2022–2024 | Green Rockets Tokatsu | 33 | (30) |
- Correct as of 16 July 2023
Provincial / State sides
| Years | Team | Apps | (Points) |
| 2010–2015, 2021, 2023 | Tasman | 52 | (124) |
- Correct as of 27 August 2023
Super Rugby
| Years | Team | Apps | (Points) |
| 2011–2013 | Crusaders | 42 | (30) |
| 2014–2015 | Chiefs | 29 | (25) |
- Correct as of 18 September 2021
International career
| Years | Team | Apps | (Points) |
| 2010 | New Zealand U20 | 4 | (20) |
- Correct as of 18 September 2021

Thomas Guthrie Marshall (born 5 July 1990) is a New Zealand rugby union player who plays fullback, centre and wing. He has played Super Rugby for both the Crusaders and the Chiefs. Marshall was educated at Nelson College from 2004 to 2008.

== Career ==
Marshall played 45 games for Tasman between 2010 and 2015, while also playing Super Rugby for both the Crusaders and the Chiefs. At the end of the 2015 season he headed overseas to play for English side Gloucester. He played 63 games for the side before it was announced in June 2020 that Marshall had left Gloucester to join Japanese side the Red Hurricanes. A side under the leadership of former Gloucester head coach Johan Ackermann. Marshall returned home to Tasman for the 2021 Bunnings NPC. The Mako went on to make the premiership final before losing 23–20 to Waikato.
