= Glenn Dickson =

New Zealand rugby union player (born 1986)

- Born: 22 October 1986 (age 40) Dunedin, New Zealand
- Height: 1.87 m (6 ft 2 in)
- Weight: 96 kg (15 st 2 lb)
- School: King's High School, Dunedin

Rugby union career
- Position(s): Fly-half, Centre, Fullback
Amateur team(s)
Years	Team	Apps	(Points)
2016–2017	Weston-super-Mare RFC		
Senior career
Years	Team	Apps	(Points)
2013–2014	Northampton Saints		
Provincial / State sides
Years	Team	Apps	(Points)
2009–2013	Otago	33	(273)

Glenn Dickson (born 22 October 1986 in Dunedin, New Zealand) is a rugby union player who signed for Northampton Saints in the Aviva Premiership. He now resides in the seaside town of Weston-super-Mare, coaches the local team and is involved in rugby development for the region.

== Club career ==
Noted for his former career as a child actor, Dickson moved through age group levels for Otago and made the provincial side for the 2009 Air New Zealand Cup, where he made 6 starts and led the team with 72 points.

In the 2010 ITM Cup, Dickson appeared in all 13 Otago contests, starting in 12 of them, and again led the side with 99 points.

In the 2012 ITM Cup, he captained Otago to the final, which they lost to Counties at ECO Light Stadium.

He has signed for Northampton Saints for the 2013 rugby season, ending his long career with Otago.
