= Craig Clare =

New Zealand rugby union player (born 1984)

- Full name: Craig Denis Clare
- Born: 19 August 1984 (age 42) Palmerston North, New Zealand
- Height: 182 cm (6 ft 0 in)
- Weight: 92 kg (203 lb; 14 st 7 lb)
- School: Palmerston North Boys High School

Rugby union career
- Position(s): Fullback, Centre, Wing
- Current team: Wanganui
Senior career
Years	Team	Apps	(Points)
2003–2012	Manawatu	44	(188)
2005–2006	Otago	17	(25)
2007	Highlanders	4	(0)
2009–2010	Viadana	13	(10)
2013–2014	Krasny Yar	22	(100)
2015	Bay of Plenty	8	(0)
2016–	Wanganui	28	(267)
- Correct as of 7 June 2020
International career
Years	Team	Apps	(Points)
2005	New Zealand U21	1	(0)
2017–2019	Heartland XV	4	(20)
- Correct as of 7 June 2020

Craig Clare (born 19 August 1984) is a New Zealand rugby union player who currently plays for Wanganui in the Heartland Championship. He also played for the Highlanders in the Super Rugby competition, before a broken leg stalled his career and caused a long injury layoff.

== Playing career ==
=== New Zealand ===
Clare made his debut for Manawatu in 2003, and spent two seasons with the province before transferring to Otago in 2005 in the hopes of earning a Super Rugby contract with the Highlanders.

After a strong 2006, Clare was included in the Highlanders squad for the 2007 Super 14 season. Aged only 22, his Super Rugby career was off to a highly promising start as he started four of the team's first five games of the season. However, his career came to a crashing halt on 2 March, 2007 in a game against the Blues when he suffered a compound fracture to his leg. Clare's leg injury forced a two-year layoff from the sport, and he didn't play again until 2009.

After a stint in Italy, Clare returned to New Zealand in 2010 and signed back with Manawatu. He proceeded to start all 13 games of the 2010 season for the Turbos, primarily at his preferred position of fullback.

Clare signed for Bay of Plenty in 2015.

He joined Heartland Championship (2nd tier) team Steelform Wanganui in 2016.

=== Europe ===
After a long injury layoff, Clare returned to high level rugby in 2009, signing with Rugby Viadana of the Italian Super 10 (now Top12). He enjoyed a solid season in Italy, but fell victim to import restrictions when the club joined the Celtic League as Aironi.

Clare spent the 2010–11 season with Spanish side Bera Bera RT before returning to Manawatu again for the 2011 provincial campaign in New Zealand.

In 2013 he signed with Russian club Krasny Yar on a 6-month contract.
