= David Bason (rugby union) =

- Full name: David Mark Bason
- Born: 28 August 1986 (age 40)
- Height: 184 cm (6 ft 0 in)
- Weight: 90 kg (198 lb)

Rugby union career
- Position: Half-back
Provincial / State sides
Years	Team	Apps	(Points)
2006–09	Waikato	30	(5)
2011–12	Counties Manukau	19	(10)
2013	Thames Valley	9	(10)
2014–15	North Harbour	14	(0)
Super Rugby
Years	Team	Apps	(Points)
2008–09	Chiefs	6	(0)

David Mark Bason (born 28 August 1986) is a New Zealand former professional rugby union player.

Bason is the son of former Waikato player Stu Bason and was educated at Hamilton Boys' High School. He earned New Zealand Schools representative honours in his first season as a halfback, having previously featured on the wing.

A NZ Colt in 2007, Bason made six appearances with the Chiefs over two seasons and featured in the 2009 Super 14 final loss to the Bulls. He competed for Waikato, Counties Manukau, Thames Valley and North Harbour in provincial rugby.
