= Eric Sione =

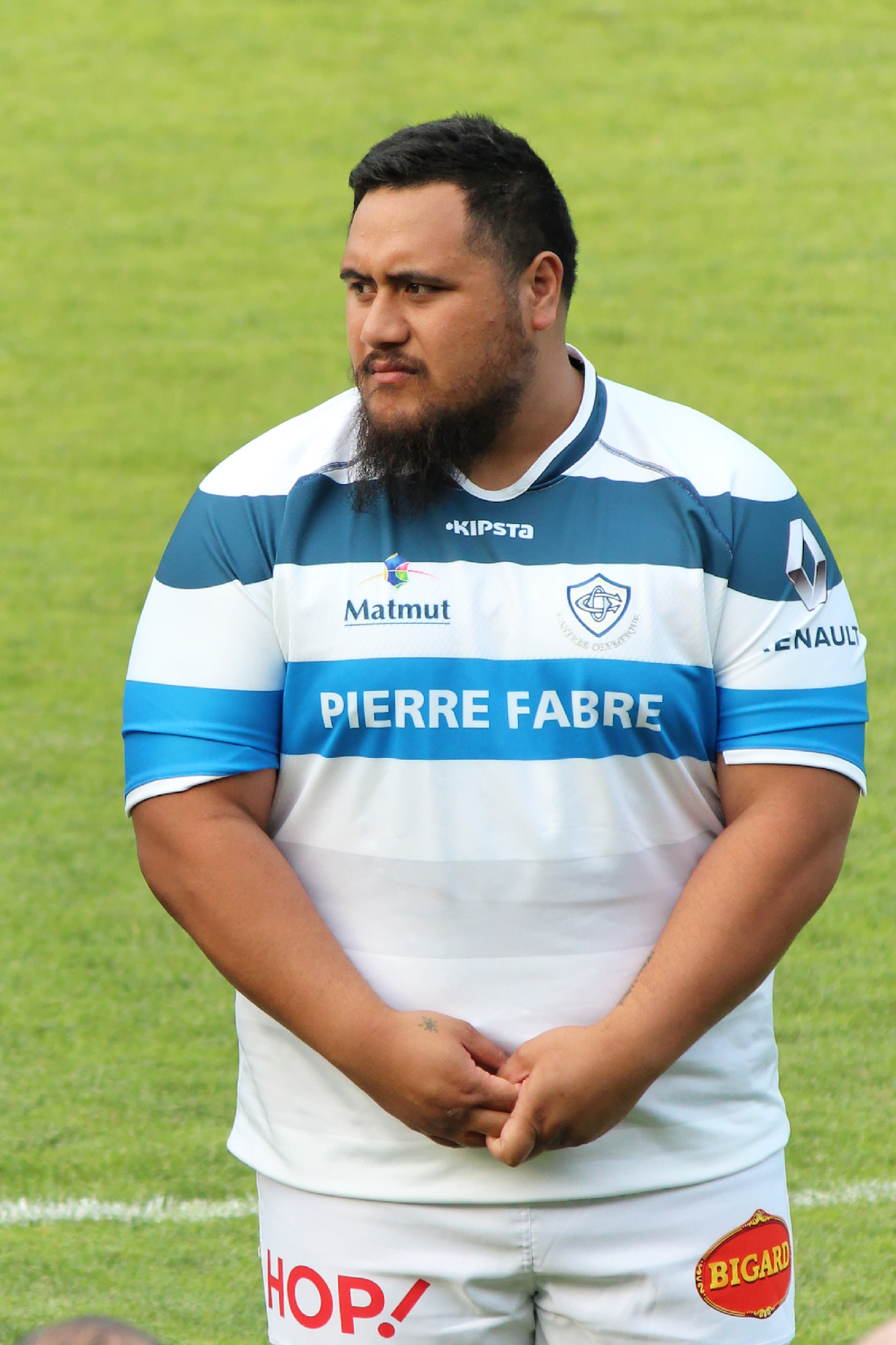
- Born: Eric Dominic Sione; 29 October 1992 (age 34)
- Height: 1.87 m (6 ft 1 1/2 in)
- Weight: 140 kg (22 st 1 lb)
- School: St. Patrick's College

Rugby union career
- Position: Prop
Senior career
| Years | Team | Apps | (Points) |
| 2015–18 | Castres | 21 | (5) |
| 2018- | USA Perpignan | 11 | (5) |
- Correct as of 6 December 2019
Provincial / State sides
| Years | Team | Apps | (Points) |
| 2012–14 | Wellington | 23 | (10) |
- Correct as of 13 October 2014
Super Rugby
| Years | Team | Apps | (Points) |
| 2013–14 | Hurricanes | 0 | (0) |
- Correct as of 4 November 2012
International career
| Years | Team | Apps | (Points) |
| 2012 | New Zealand under-20 | 3 | (0) |
- Correct as of 4 November 2012

Eric Sione (born 29 October 1992) is a New Zealand rugby union footballer who plays as a prop. His impressive performances for the Wellington Lions in the ITM Cup saw him named in the Hurricanes squad for the 2013 Super Rugby season.

Sione was a member of the New Zealand Under 20 team which competed in the 2012 IRB Junior World Championship in South Africa.
