= Tristan Moran =

- Born: Tristan Moran; 15 August 1983 (age 43) Blenheim, New Zealand
- Height: 180 cm (5 ft 11 in)
- Weight: 114 kg (17 st 13 lb)
- School: St. Bede's

Rugby union career
- Position: Loosehead / Tighthead Prop
Provincial / State sides
Years	Team	Apps	(Points)
2006–09	Tasman	40	(25)
2010–2012	Bay of Plenty	28	(20)
Super Rugby
Years	Team	Apps	(Points)
2010	Chiefs	1	(0)
2012	Hurricanes	3	(0)

Tristan Moran (born 15 August 1983 in Blenheim, New Zealand) is a rugby union footballer who plays as a prop for Bay of Plenty Steamers in the ITM Cup and the Hurricanes and Chiefs in Super Rugby.
