= Tony Ensor (rugby union, born 1991) =

New Zealand rugby union player

- Born: 11 May 1991 (age 35) Balclutha, New Zealand
- Height: 187 cm (6 ft 2 in)
- Weight: 92 kg (14 st 7 lb)
- School: South Otago High School
- University: University of Otago

Rugby union career
- Position(s): Fullback; Wing
- Current team: Stade Francais
Senior career
Years	Team	Apps	(Points)
2017–	Stade Français		
Provincial / State sides
Years	Team	Apps	(Points)
2012–16	Otago	34	(60)
- Correct as of 28 October 2016
Super Rugby
Years	Team	Apps	(Points)
2013	Highlanders	1	(0)
- Correct as of 2 June 2013
National sevens team
Years	Team		Comps
2014	New Zealand 7s		

Tony Ensor (born 11 May 1991) is a New Zealand rugby union player who plays either as a fullback or wing for Stade Français in the Top 14. He previously played for Otago in the National Provincial Championship. He scored 6 tries in 11 matches during the 2012 ITM Cup and that form saw him named in theHighlanders Wider Training Squad for the 2013 Super Rugby season.

In October 2014 he was named in the New Zealand Sevens side to play in the opening tournament of the HSBC World Sevens Series on the Gold Coast, Australia.
