= Liaki Moli =

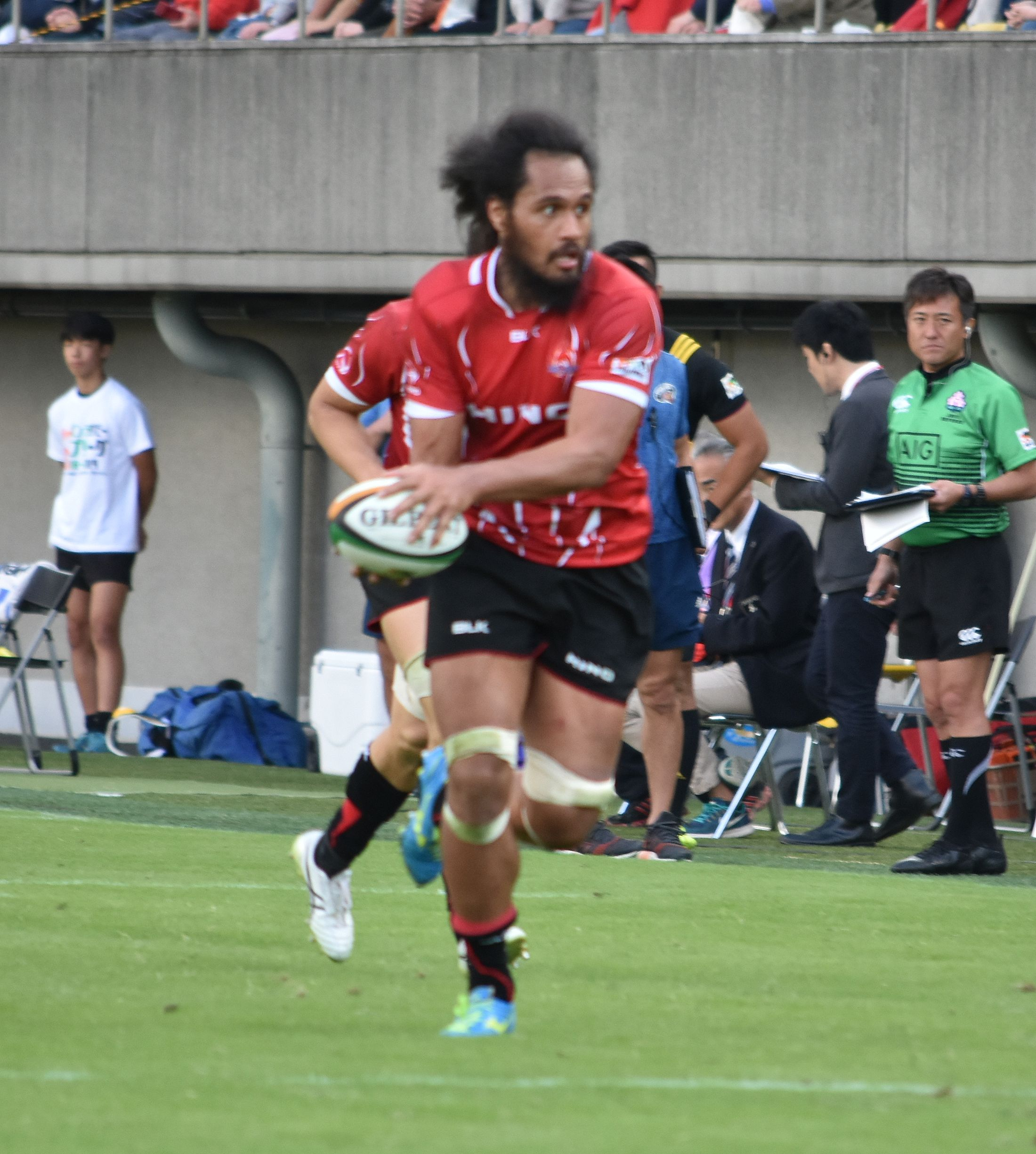
- Born: Liakimatagi Moli; 4 January 1990 (age 36) Auckland, New Zealand
- Height: 1.94 m (6 ft 4 in)
- Weight: 110 kg (243 lb)

Rugby union career
- Position: Lock
- Current team: Yokohama Canon Eagles
Senior career
Years	Team	Apps	(Points)
2018–2021	Hino Red Dolphins	18	(20)
2021–	Canon Eagles	66	(25)
- Correct as of 20 February 2021
Provincial / State sides
Years	Team	Apps	(Points)
2010–2016	Auckland	48	(20)
- Correct as of 20 February 2021
Super Rugby
Years	Team	Apps	(Points)
2012–2014	Blues	24	(5)
2016–2017	Sunwolves	21	(10)
- Correct as of 20 February 2021
International career
Years	Team	Apps	(Points)
2009	Tonga U20	5	(5)
2010	New Zealand U20	3	(0)
- Correct as of 20 February 2021

Liaki Moli (born 4 January 1990) is a New Zealand-born Japanese rugby union player, who specialises as a lock forward. He played for the Blues in Super Rugby from 2012 to 2014, and signed for the Japanese Sunwolves for the 2016 season. Also, he has played for Auckland in the ITM Cup since 2010. He is of Tongan and Niuean descent.

== Career ==
=== Early career ===
Moli was selected for the New Zealand U20 side in 2010, for whom he was a standout player at the world championship in Argentina. He made his Auckland debut in the same year. He was also named the age-group player of the year for 2010 by the NZRU.

=== Super Rugby ===
A serious shoulder injury at the end of 2010 ruled Moli out of contention for a Super Rugby contract in 2011, meaning 2012 is his first season with the Blues.

Moli was signed by the Japanese Sunwolves for the 2016 season.
