= Ash Moeke =

- Born: 9 March 1988 (age 38) Auckland, New Zealand
- Height: 1.82 m (5 ft 11 1/2 in)
- Weight: 90 kg (200 lb)
- School: Auckland Grammar School

Rugby union career
- Position: First five-eighth
- Current team: Vannes
Senior career
Years	Team	Apps	(Points)
2013–15	Tarbes	52	(538)
–	Vannes		
- Correct as of 24 August 2015
Provincial / State sides
Years	Team	Apps	(Points)
2008, 2011–12	Northland	17	(78)
2009–10	Auckland	11	(83)
2015–	Southland	8	(31)
- Correct as of 12 October 2015

Ash Moeke (born 9 March 1988) is a New Zealand rugby union player. He currently plays at French club Vannes having previously been playing as a First five-eighth for the Southland Stags in the ITM Cup competition.

== Playing career ==
Moeke began his professional rugby career for Northland Taniwha as a 20 year old before transferring to play for southern neighbours Auckland before the 2009 Air New Zealand Cup. He spent the next two seasons playing for the province appearing in a total of 11 games before returning to the Taniwha where he established himself as the starting first five.

After spending two seasons as Northland's first five, Moeke headed to France where he represented Tarbes Pyrénées Rugby. He became known for his accurate kicking game both in general play and as a goal kicker as well as his ability to facilitate the game with his passing and running. After three years with the Pro D2 side Moeke returned to New Zealand where he signed with Southland Rugby as an insurance plan for incumbent five eighth Lima Sopoaga who was selected for the All Blacks after a strong Super Rugby season.
