= James Marshall (rugby union) =

NZ rugby union player

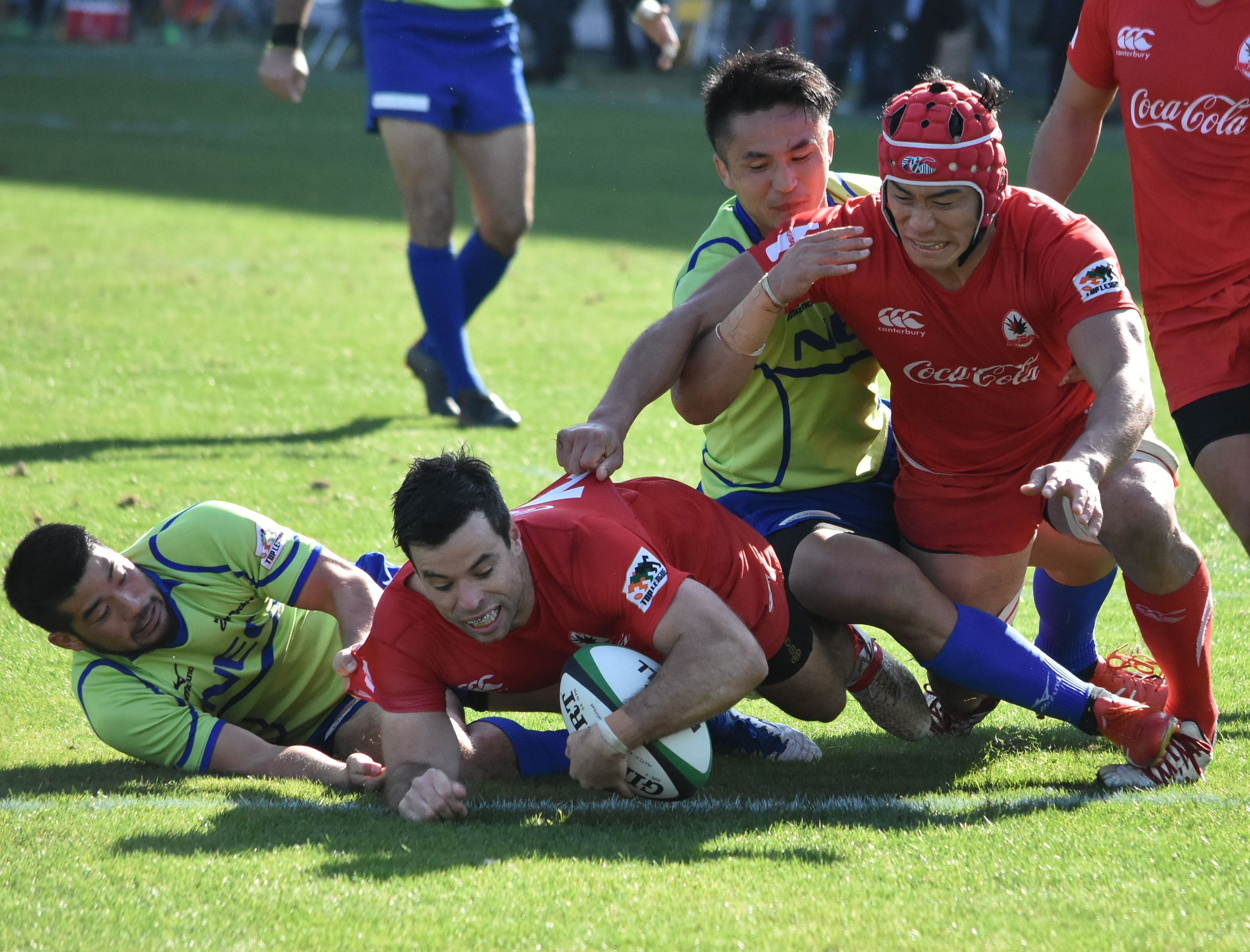
- Marshall in a match in 2018
- Full name: James Ryan Marshall
- Born: 7 December 1988 (age 37) Auckland, New Zealand
- Height: 183 cm (6 ft 0 in)
- Weight: 93 kg (205 lb; 14 st 9 lb)
- School: Nelson College
- Notable relative: Tom Marshall (brother)

Rugby union career
- Position(s): First five-eighth, Fullback, Centre
Senior career
Years	Team	Apps	(Points)
2008–2011	Tasman	36	(46)
2010–2011	Aironi	18	(47)
2012–2015	Taranaki	26	(30)
2013–2016, 2019–2020	Hurricanes	54	(87)
2016–2018	London Irish	43	(98)
2018–2020	Coca-Cola Red Sparks	15	(72)
- Correct as of 15 April 2019
National sevens team
Years	Team		Comps
2011	New Zealand		2
- Correct as of 15 April 2019

James Ryan Marshall (born 7 December 1988) is a former New Zealand rugby union player. He played in the First five-eighth, Fullback and occasionally Second five-eighth positions for the Hurricanes in Super Rugby and Tasman in the Bunnings NPC. He also captained the Taranaki Bulls in the ITM Cup. He is the older brother of Crusader Tom Marshall. He announced his retirement on his What a Lad Podcast in January 2021 due to an ongoing injury to his hip. He is currently the assistant coach for the Crusaders.

== Early life ==
Marshall was born in Auckland but moved to Nelson as a child, playing his junior rugby for Stoke and Nelson. He was educated at Nelson College from 2002 to 2006 and played for the school's top side in his final two years there. Marshall also came to the attention of national selectors. However, he failed to make the New Zealand Under 17s and Under 19s. It was the same with the New Zealand Under 20s, losing out to Daniel Kirkpatrick of Hawke's Bay and Trent Renata of Waikato.

== Domestic career ==
Marshall started his career with Tasman after he made his debut for the Mako in the 2008 Air New Zealand Cup competition, coming on as a replacement against Bay of Plenty. In 2009 he suffered an injury in the first match which kept him out for most of the season, but went on and made his first full game against Taranaki. During the 2010 ITM Cup he made an immediate impact with his decisive running and ability to spot a gap. His strong performances saw him take over Fly-half, mainly starting in the number 10 position throughout the season.

Marshall left for Italy to begin a six month contract with Aironi Rugby after his name was missing from Super 15 squad selections. He spent five months playing for the side, making several Heineken Cup appearances and also featuring in the Celtic League. However he continued his career with Tasman during the 2011 season before he headed north on a two-year contract with Taranaki, having played 36 games and scored 46 points for the side. He made his debut for Taranaki, playing the season's first two Ranfurly Shield matches against King Country and Wanganui. His performances didn't go unnoticed by the national media or the Super Rugby coaches as he went on to play all 12 matches and score 5 tries. Marshall's versatility and high standard of performance in several positions, including wing, first five-eighth, fullback and second five-eighth helped him win Taranaki back of the year for 2012 ahead of finalists Frazier Climo and Jamison Gibson-Park.

His form for Taranaki in the number 10 jersey in Beauden Barrett's absence saw him pick up a Hurricanes contract in late 2012. He played his first Super Rugby match in the Hurricanes 29–28 victory over the Crusaders in Week 4 of the 2013 competition. He had an eye catching debut season, starting the season as the Hurricanes backup first five-eighth behind Taranaki teammate Beauden Barrett and ending it by making three straight starting appearances at fullback. In all, he started or came off the bench in eight matches out of 16 in 2013.

Marshall made two starts for the Hurricanes at fullback in 2014, before captaining Taranaki to win their maiden ITM Cup premiership title.

On 6 January 2016, it was announced that Marshall would join the Greene King IPA Championship side London Irish ahead of the 2016-17 season. The Hurricanes went on to win the 2016 Super Rugby season for the first time.

He returned to the Hurricanes for the 2019 Super Rugby season. He was not named in the Hurricanes squad for the 2021 Super Rugby season.

Marshall returned to Tasman for the 2020 Mitre 10 Cup but it was announced he would miss the season with injury. The Mako went on to win their second premiership title in a row.

== International career ==
In 2011, Marshall played for New Zealand at the Sevens World Series on the Gold Coast and in Dubai. However, he missed the competition's third leg, in Port Elizabeth, because he returned New Zealand to join the Hurricanes Wider Training Group.
