= Frazier Climo =

New Zealand-born Scottish rugby player (born 1987)

- Born: 6 February 1987 (age 39) Stratford, New Zealand
- Height: 189 cm (6 ft 2 in)
- Weight: 98 kg (216 lb; 15 st 6 lb)
- School: New Plymouth Boys' High School

Rugby union career
- Position(s): First five-eighth, Wing
- Current team: Ayrshire Bulls
Senior career
Years	Team	Apps	(Points)
2008–	Ayr		
2011–2013	Taranaki	18	(120)
2013–2015	Scarlets	16	(18)
2015–	Ayrshire Bulls	5	(15)
- Correct as of 12 May 2020
International career
Years	Team	Apps	(Points)
2019	Scotland Club XV	0	(0)
- Correct as of 12 May 2020
Coaching career
- Years: Team
- 2019–: Ayrshire Bulls (assistant)
- Correct as of 12 May 2020

Frazier Climo (born 6 February 1987 in Stratford, New Zealand) is a Scotland Club XV international rugby union player. He plays for the Ayrshire Bulls in the Super 6.

He played on the wing (and occasionally fullback) for the Scarlets

== Life and career ==
Climo previously played for Scottish Premiership side Ayr RFC and Taranaki in the ITM Cup, where he had a kicking percentage of over 80% success rate. He signed for the Scarlets in July 2013.
