= Justin Davies (rugby union) =

- Born: Justin Bradley Davies; 13 February 1986 (age 40) Waikare, New Zealand
- Height: 1.85 m (6 ft 1 in)
- Weight: 112 kg (247 lb)
- School: Bay of Islands College

Rugby union career
Provincial / State sides
Years	Team	Apps	(Points)
2006–2008, 2011–2013, 2021	Northland	41	(15)
- Correct as of 6 November 2021

Justin Bradley Davies (born 13 February 1986) is a New Zealand rugby union player. His position is Prop. He made his debut for Northland on 13 August 2006 against Otago. Originally coming from Moerewa, he plays club rugby for Ngati Hine Moerewa/United Kawakawa.
