= Kendrick Lynn =

NZ rugby union player

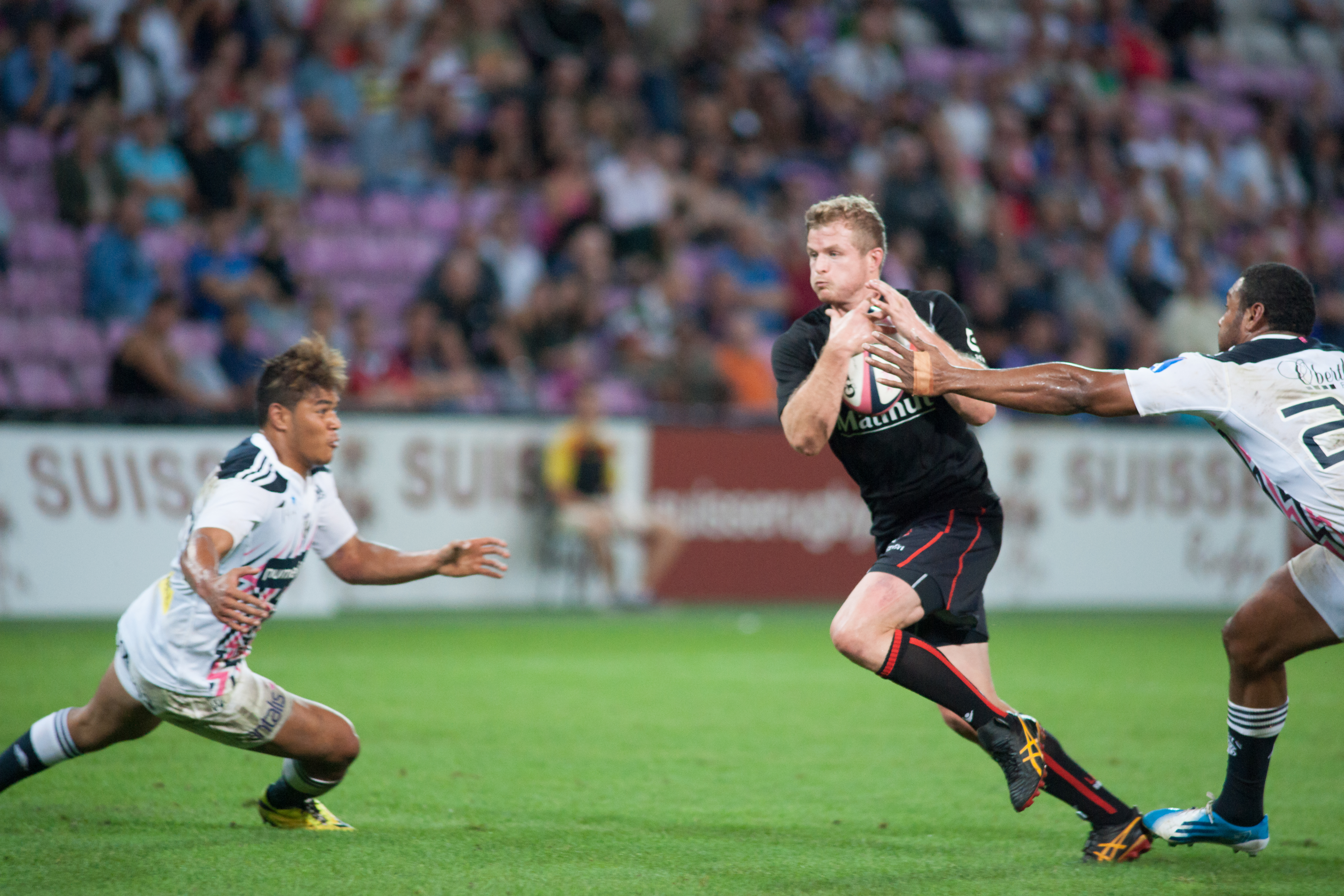
- Born: Kendrick Graeme Lynn; 30 November 1982 (age 43) Tokoroa, New Zealand
- Height: 1.84 m (6 ft 0 in)
- Weight: 90 kg (14 st 2 lb)
- School: St Peter's School, Cambridge
- University: Otago University

Rugby union career
- Position(s): Fullback; Centre; Wing
Senior career
Years	Team	Apps	(Points)
2013–16	Lyon	35	(45)
Provincial / State sides
Years	Team	Apps	(Points)
2006–11	Southland	61	(54)
2012–13	Bay of Plenty	19	(10)
Super Rugby
Years	Team	Apps	(Points)
2009–12	Highlanders	36	(20)
National sevens team
Years	Team		Comps
2007–2008	New Zealand Sevens		12

Kendrick Graeme Lynn (born 30 November 1982) is a former New Zealand rugby union player. A versatile utility back, he last played for Lyon in the French Top 14 competition.

== Playing career ==
=== Provincial Rugby ===
Lynn was educated at St Peters School in Cambridge, New Zealand and played in Waikato age group teams while at school. He then studied at the University of Otago, completing a BPhEd degree in 2006.

After graduation, Lynn chose to stay in the South Island, playing his club rugby for the Invercargill Rugby Club and making his provincial debut for Southland in the 2006 Air New Zealand Cup. By the 2009 Air New Zealand Cup, Lynn had developed into one of the Stags' top performers, starting 14 games and scoring 4 tries as Southland claimed the Ranfurly Shield that year.

In the 2010 ITM Cup, Lynn missed substantial time through injury but still recorded 3 tries in only 8 starts.

After 6 seasons with Southland, Lynn moved north to sign with Bay of Plenty for the 2012 ITM Cup.

=== Super Rugby ===
On the back of his solid form with Southland, Lynn was selected to the Highlanders squad for the 2009 Super 14 season. Used mainly on the wing, he made 8 appearances and 5 starts, and had his finest performance in the team's victory over the Queensland Reds at Rugby Park Stadium, scoring a crucial second half try - his first in Super Rugby - which sealed the victory.

In the 2010 Super 14 season, Lynn was shifted to centre and emerged as a more central part of the squad, making 10 starts and scoring a further 2 tries, while impressing with his workrate and defensive play. He further built on this in 2011, playing every minute of every game for the Highlanders.

A neck injury curtailed Lynn's 2012 season, and he was limited to just two substitute appearances for the Highlanders. He used the off season to backpack around central and South America for 4 months with his wife, Rebecca.

Upon returning to NZ he was called into the Chiefs squad and enjoyed being a part of their championship winning team of 2013.

=== Europe ===
Following the 2013 ITM Cup, Lynn left New Zealand for France, signing with Lyon of the Pro D2 competition. In his first year in Lyon, he scored 7 tries in 15 matches to help the club earn promotion to the Top 14.

=== Rugby Sevens ===
In 2008 he was selected for the New Zealand Sevens team taking part in the IRB Sevens World Series tournaments in London and Edinburgh, which New Zealand won.

=== Coaching career ===
In 2016 Kendrick was asked to move into the staff as the Backs and Skills coach for Lyon in the Top 14. That year they achieved their goal of maintaining their position in the competition.

The 2017 season the club continued its rise and after 8 rounds sat top of the table in the French league. The season finished with Lyon qualifying for the quarter finals in Toulon. Lyon - against all odds - pulled off a massive upset victory, securing an historic semi-final berth that was played at Groupama Stadium in Lyon verse Montpellier.

Lynn has played a significant role in the development of a fast, free flowing attack which is capable of scoring at will and a tough, resolute defence.
