= Trent Renata =

NZ rugby union player

- Born: Trent Wiremu Kitahi Renata; 13 May 1988 (age 38) Hamilton, New Zealand
- Height: 180 cm (5 ft 11 in)
- Weight: 90 kg (14 st 2 lb; 198 lb)
- School: Hamilton Boys' High School

Rugby union career
- Position: Fullback
Provincial / State sides
Years	Team	Apps	(Points)
2008–13	Waikato	66	(444)
2014	Otago	9	(0)
2015	Tasman	10	(17)
2015-16	Mogliano	27	(96)
2017-	Wellington	15	(32)
- Correct as of 23 April 2019
Super Rugby
Years	Team	Apps	(Points)
2010	Chiefs	2	(10)
2013–15	Highlanders	10	(9)
International career
Years	Team	Apps	(Points)
2008	New Zealand U20	5	(59)
–	Māori All Blacks		

Trent Wiremu Kitahi Renata (born 13 May 1988) is a New Zealand rugby union player who currently is playing for Wellington in the Mitre 10 Cup.

== Career ==
He started his rugby career playing at fullback for Waikato in the ITM Cup.

He made his Super Rugby debut for the Chiefs during the 2010 Super 14 season, scoring 10 points in 2 games whilst a member of the franchise's Wider Training Group.

An injury crisis in the Highlanders camp ahead of the 2013 Super Rugby season saw him named as a late replacement for Declan O'Donnell in the Dunedin side's main squad.

Renata has previously represented both New Zealand Under 20 and the Māori All Blacks.

Renata signed for Otago for the 2014 ITM Cup season, allowing him to play during the post-season for his Dunedin Club Rugby team, Dunedin.

Renata signed for the Tasman Makos for the 2015 ITM Cup season.

Renata is now currently playing for Wellington in the 2017 Mitre 10 Cup season.
