= 2015 Chiefs (Super Rugby) season =

Chiefs
- 2015 season
- Head coach: Dave Rennie
- Captains: Liam Messam; Aaron Cruden
- Stadium: Waikato Stadium, Hamilton; Baypark Stadium, Mount Maunganui; ECOLight Stadium, Pukekohe; Yarrow Stadium, New Plymouth
- Overall competition: 5th
- N.Z. Conference: 3rd
- Record: Won 10, Lost 7
- Top try scorer: All: Charlie Ngatai (6)
- Top points scorer: All: Aaron Cruden (93)

2015 was another tough year for the Chiefs rugby team. They won 10 of their Super Rugby games and finished 5th overall on the table for the 2nd year in a row, and 3rd behind the Hurricanes and Highlanders in the New Zealand Conference. Playing the Highlanders in the qualifying finals in Dunedin was always going to be tough losing 24-14.

== Standings ==
The final standings of the 2015 Super Rugby season were:

New Zealand Conference
Pos	Team	P	W	D	L	PF	PA	PD	TF	TA	TB	LB	Pts
1	Hurricanes	16	14	0	2	458	288	+170	58	31	9	1	66
2	Highlanders	16	11	0	5	450	333	+117	54	40	6	3	53
3	Chiefs	16	10	0	6	372	299	+73	40	27	4	4	48
4	Crusaders	16	9	0	7	481	338	+143	56	39	8	2	46
5	Blues	16	3	0	13	282	428	−146	29	50	2	6	20

Overall standings
Pos	Team	P	W	D	L	PF	PA	PD	TF	TA	TB	LB	Pts
1	(New Zealand) Hurricanes	16	14	0	2	458	288	+170	58	31	9	1	66
2	(Australia) Waratahs	16	11	0	5	409	313	+96	50	41	5	3	52
3	(South Africa) Stormers	16	10	1	5	373	323	+50	32	35	2	1	45
4	(New Zealand) Highlanders	16	11	0	5	450	333	+117	54	40	6	3	53
5	(New Zealand) Chiefs	16	10	0	6	372	299	+73	40	27	4	4	48
6	(Australia) Brumbies	16	9	0	7	369	261	+108	45	21	6	5	47
7	(New Zealand) Crusaders	16	9	0	7	481	338	+143	56	39	8	2	46
8	(South Africa) Lions	16	9	1	6	342	364	−22	33	41	2	2	42
9	(South Africa) Bulls	16	7	0	9	397	388	+9	37	39	4	6	38
10	(Australia) Rebels	16	7	0	9	319	354	−35	35	42	3	5	36
11	(South Africa) Sharks	16	7	0	9	338	401	−63	37	43	3	3	34
12	(South Africa) Cheetahs	16	5	0	11	357	531	−174	44	65	4	2	26
13	(Australia) Reds	16	4	0	12	247	434	−187	32	53	3	3	22
14	(New Zealand) Blues	16	3	0	13	282	428	−146	29	50	2	6	20
15	(Australia) Force	16	3	0	13	245	384	−139	28	43	3	4	19

== Results ==
The following fixtures were released on 18 September 2014:

Round 1	14 February 2015	Blues	18–23	Chiefs	QBE Stadium, Albany
	19:35	Pen: Ihaia West 5', 29', 38', 45', 59', 71' (6/6)	Report; Scoreboard	Try: James Lowe 12'; Bryce Heem 15'; Con: Damian McKenzie 13', 16' (2/2); Pen: Damian McKenzie 20', 33', 47' (3/5); Cards: Matt Symons (yellow card) 44' to 54'	Attendance: 11,100; Referee: Chris Pollock

Round 2	20 February 2015	Chiefs	19–17	Brumbies	Yarrow Stadium, New Plymouth
	17:35	Try: Charlie Ngatai 15'; Con: Aaron Cruden 16' (1/1); Pen: Aaron Cruden 7', 33', 68', 80' (4/4)	Report; Scoreboard	Try: Ita Vaea 19'; Con: Christian Lealiifano (0/1); Pen: Christian Lealiifano 5', 44', 58' (3/3); Nic White 14' (1/2)	Attendance: 6,985; Referee: Steve Walsh

Round 3	28 February 2015	Chiefs	40–16	Crusaders	Waikato Stadium, Hamilton
	19:35	Try: Sonny Bill Williams 13'; Augustine Pulu 22'; Charlie Ngatai 33'; Tom Marshall 63'; James Lowe 67'; Con: Aaron Cruden 23', 34', 68' (3/5); Pen: Aaron Cruden 31', 49', 55' (3/4); Cards: James Lowe (yellow card) 8' to 20'; Damian McKenzie (yellow card) 78'	Report; Scoreboard	Try: Andrew Ellis 45'; Con: Colin Slade 46' (1/1); Pen: Colin Slade 3', 8', 26' (3/5); Cards: Matt Todd (yellow card) 21' to 31'	Attendance: 18,166; Referee: Mike Fraser

Round 4	6 March 2015	Chiefs	17–20	Highlanders	Waikato Stadium, Hamilton
	19:35	Try: penalty try 48', 57'; Con: Aaron Cruden 49', 57' (2/2); Pen: Aaron Cruden 5' (1/4); Andrew Horrell (0/1); Cards: James Lowe (yellow card) 78'	Report; Scoreboard	Try: Patrick Osborne 35'; Con: Lima Sopoaga (0/1); Pen: Lima Sopoaga 20', 28', 40' (3/3); Marty Banks 77', 80' (2/2); Cards: Joe Wheeler (yellow card) 46' to 57'	Referee: Nick Briant

Round 5	14 March 2015	Stormers	19–28	Chiefs	Newlands Stadium, Cape Town
	15:00	Try: Kobus van Wyk 19'; Con: Kurt Coleman 20' (1/1); Pen: Kurt Coleman 15', 23', 35' (3/4); Demetri Catrakilis 63' (1/1)	Report; Scoreboard	Try: Aaron Cruden 27'; James Lowe 48'; Sam Cane 71'; Con: Aaron Cruden 28', 49' (2/3); Pen: Aaron Cruden 5', 40', 60' (3/4)	Attendance: 42,247; Referee: Jaco Peyper

Round 6	21 March 2015	Sharks	12–11	Chiefs	Kings Park Stadium, Durban
	19:10	Pen: Patrick Lambie 3', 32', 40', 60' (4/6); Cards: Bismarck du Plessis (red card) 18'; François Steyn (red card) 28'	Report; Scoreboard	Try: Sam Cane 34'; Con: Aaron Cruden (0/1); Pen: Aaron Cruden 6', 29' (2/3); Drop: Aaron Cruden (0/1); Cards: Hika Elliot (red card) 15'	Attendance: 18,564; Referee: Angus Gardner

Round 7	28 March 2015	Chiefs	37–27	Cheetahs	Waikato Stadium, Hamilton
	16:30	Try: Michael Leitch 2'; Liam Messam 18'; Sam Cane 68'; Andrew Horrell 76'; Con: Aaron Cruden 3', 19', 69', 77' (4/4); Pen: Aaron Cruden 46', 53', 61' (3/3); Cards: Michael Fitzgerald (yellow card) 24' to 35'; Ben Tameifuna (yellow card) 32' to 41'	Report; Scoreboard	Try: Boom Prinsloo 28'; Heinrich Brüssow 54', 80'; Con: Joe Pietersen 29', 55' (2/2); Willie du Plessis 81' (1/1); Pen: Joe Pietersen 8', 11' (2/3); Cards: Heinrich Brüssow (yellow card) 66' to 76'	Attendance: 11,610; Referee: Craig Joubert

Round 8	4 April 2015	Chiefs	23–16	Blues	Waikato Stadium, Hamilton
	19:35	Try: James Lowe 28'; Tom Marshall 68'; Con: Aaron Cruden 29', 69' (2/2); Pen: Aaron Cruden 18', 59', 75' (3/5)	Report; Scoreboard	Try: Jerome Kaino 47'; Con: Daniel Bowden 48' (1/1); Pen: Daniel Bowden 34', 54' (2/2); Ihaia West 81' (1/1)	Attendance: 14,248; Referee: Mike Fraser

Round 10	17 April 2015	Crusaders	9–26	Chiefs	AMI Stadium, Christchurch
	19:35	Pen: Dan Carter 7', 37', 43' (3/6)	Report; Scoreboard	Try: Michael Leitch 21'; James Lowe 40'; Liam Squire 71'; Con: Andrew Horrell 22' (1/3); Pen: Aaron Cruden 10' (1/1); Tim Nanai-Williams 19' (1/1); Andrew Horrell 59' (1/2); Cards: Sam Cane (yellow card) 6' to 17'	Attendance: 14,500; Referee: Nick Briant

Round 11	24 April 2015	Chiefs	35–27	Force	Waikato Stadium, Hamilton
	19:35	Try: Charlie Ngatai 19'; Hika Elliot 39' penalty try 46'; Tim Nanai-Williams 66'; Con: Marty McKenzie 20', 40', 47' (3/4); Pen: Marty McKenzie 7', 18', 24' (3/3)	Report; Scoreboard	Try: Angus Cottrell 15'; Luke Morahan 56'; Matt Hodgson 62'; Heath Tessmann 77'; Con: Luke Burton 57', 63' (2/4); Pen: Luke Burton 10' (1/1); Cards: Ian Prior (red card) 28'	Attendance: 13,948; Referee: Angus Gardner

Round 12	2 May 2015	Rebels	16–15	Chiefs	AAMI Park, Melbourne
	19:40	Try: Scott Higginbotham 18'; Nic Stirzaker 39'; Con: Jack Debreczeni (0/2); Pen: Jack Debreczeni 6', 35' (2/2); Bryce Hegarty (0/2)	Report; Scoreboard	Try: Charlie Ngatai 58'; Michael Leitch 69'; Con: Damian McKenzie 59' (1/2); Pen: Andrew Horrell 23' (1/2); Cards: James Lowe (yellow card) 34' to 45'; Liam Messam (yellow card) 75'	Attendance: 13,023; Referee: Andrew Lees

Round 14	16 May 2015	Hurricanes	22–18	Chiefs	Westpac Stadium, Wellington
	19:35	Try: Ma'a Nonu 10', 68'; Ardie Savea 46'; Con: James Marshall 11', 69' (2/3); Pen: James Marshall 38' (1/1)	Report; Scoreboard	Try: Charlie Ngatai 40'; Sam Cane 75'; Con: Damian McKenzie 40' (1/2); Pen: Damian McKenzie 13', 24' (2/3); Cards: Liam Squire (yellow card) 49' to 59'	Attendance: 17,770; Referee: Glen Jackson

Round 15	22 May 2015	Chiefs	34–20	Bulls	Rotorua International Stadium, Rotorua
	19:35	Try: Liam Messam 23'; Bryce Heem 28'; Augustine Pulu 54', 56'; Tim Nanai-Williams 80'; Con: Damian McKenzie 24', 55', 57' (3/5); Pen: Damian McKenzie 6' (1/2); Cards: Sam Cane (yellow card) 69' to 79'	Report; Scoreboard	Try: Jan Serfontein 9'; Bjorn Basson 13'; Lappies Labuschagné 73'; Con: Handré Pollard 14' (1/3); Pen: Handré Pollard 16' (1/2)	Attendance: 13,714; Referee: Chris Pollock

Round 16	30 May 2015	Highlanders	36–9	Chiefs	Rugby Park, Invercargill
	19:35	Try: Patrick Osborne 29'; Waisake Naholo 44'; Richard Buckman 72'; Ben Smith 78'; Con: Lima Sopoaga 45', 73' (2/4); Pen: Lima Sopoaga 9', 12', 61', 67' (4/5)	Report; Scoreboard	Pen: Damian McKenzie 18', 51', 58' (3/4)	Attendance: 11,000; Referee: Nick Briant

Round 17	6 June 2015	Reds	3–24	Chiefs	Suncorp Stadium, Brisbane
	19:40	Pen: Quade Cooper 6' (1/2)	Report; Scoreboard	Try: Bryce Heem 25'; Liam Messam 32'; Charlie Ngatai 69'; Con: Andrew Horrell 26', 33', 70' (3/3); Pen: Andrew Horrell 51' (1/2); Cards: Michael Leitch (yellow card) 39' to 49'	Attendance: 25,841; Referee: Mike Fraser

Round 18	13 June 2015	Chiefs	13–21	Hurricanes	Yarrow Stadium, New Plymouth
	19:35	Try: Bryce Heem 16'; Con: Marty McKenzie 17' (1/1); Pen: Marty McKenzie 27', 31' (2/2); Cards: Tom Marshall (yellow card) 35' to 44'	Report; Scoreboard	Try: penalty try 35'; Conrad Smith 38'; James Marshall 54'; Con: James Marshall 36', 39', 55' (3/3)	Referee: Chris Pollock

Qualifier	20 June 2015	Highlanders	24–14	Chiefs	Forsyth Barr Stadium, Dunedin
	19:35	Try: Waisake Naholo 24', 43'; Con: Lima Sopoaga 44' (1/2); Pen: Lima Sopoaga 6', 57', 66', 80' (4/4); Drop: Waisake Naholo (0/1)	Report; Scoreboard	Try: Brodie Retallick 60'; Con: Andrew Horrell (0/1); Pen: Andrew Horrell 8', 28', 40' (3/5)	Attendance: 22,500; Referee: Chris Pollock

== Squad ==
The Chiefs squad for the 2015 Super Rugby season were:

2015 Chiefs squad
**Props**: (New Zealand) Jarrod Firth; (New Zealand) Mitchell Graham; (New Zealand) **Jamie Mackintosh**; (Tonga) Pauliasi Manu; (New Zealand) Ben Tameifuna; (Tonga) Siate Tokolahi; **Hookers**: (New Zealand) **Hika Elliot**; (New Zealand) Quentin MacDonald; (New Zealand) Rhys Marshall; **Locks**: (New Zealand) Michael Allardice; (New Zealand) Brian Alainu'uese; (New Zealand) Michael Fitzgerald; (New Zealand) **Brodie Retallick** (c); (England) Matt Symons	**Loose forwards**: (New Zealand) Johan Bardoul; (New Zealand) **Sam Cane**; (New Zealand) Mitchell Crosswell; (New Zealand) Ross Filipo; (New Zealand) Tevita Koloamatangi; (New Zealand) **Michael Leitch**; (New Zealand) **Liam Messam** (c); (New Zealand) Sean Polwart; (New Zealand) **Liam Squire**; (New Zealand) Maama Vaipulu; **Scrum-halves**: (New Zealand) Kayne Hammington; (New Zealand) **Augustine Pulu**; (New Zealand) **Brad Weber**; **Fly-halves**: (New Zealand) **Aaron Cruden** (c); (New Zealand) Marty McKenzie	**Midfield**: (New Zealand) Andrew Horrell; (New Zealand) Anton Lienert-Brown; (New Zealand) **Charlie Ngatai**; (Fiji) **Seta Tamanivalu**; (New Zealand) **Sonny Bill Williams**; **Wingers**: (New Zealand) **Hosea Gear**; (New Zealand) Bryce Heem; (New Zealand) James Lowe; (New Zealand) **Tim Nanai-Williams**; **Fullbacks**: (New Zealand) Tom Marshall; (New Zealand) Damian McKenzie
(c) denotes team captain, **Bold** denotes player is internationally capped. Nathan Harris and Tawera Kerr-Barlow were both omitted from the squad after injuries ruled them out for the entire season.

== Player statistics ==
The Chiefs players' appearance and scoring statistics for the 2015 Super Rugby season are:

Player	Apps	Tries	Cons	Pens	DGs	Pts	YC	RC
Michael Allardice	7	-	-	-	-	-	-	-
Brian Alainu'uese	2	-	-	-	-	-	-	-
Johan Bardoul	8	-	-	-	-	-	-	-
Sam Cane	15	4	-	-	-	20	2	-
Mitchell Crosswell	3	-	-	-	-	-	-	-
Aaron Cruden	8	1	14	20	-	93	-	-
Hika Elliot	15	1	-	-	-	5	-	1
Ross Filipo	2	-	-	-	-	-	-	-
Jarrod Firth	2	-	-	-	-	-	-	-
Michael Fitzgerald	15	-	-	-	-	-	1	-
Hosea Gear	6	-	-	-	-	-	-	-
Mitchell Graham	11	-	-	-	-	-	-	-
Kayne Hammington	0	-	-	-	-	-	-	-
Bryce Heem	16	4	-	-	-	20	-	-
Andrew Horrell	13	1	4	6	-	31	-	-
Tevita Koloamatangi	2	-	-	-	-	-	-	-
Michael Leitch	13	3	-	-	-	15	1	-
Anton Lienert-Brown	6	-	-	-	-	-	-	-
James Lowe	11	5	-	-	-	25	3	-
Quentin MacDonald	13	-	-	-	-	-	-	-
Jamie Mackintosh	5	-	-	-	-	-	-	-
Pauliasi Manu	16	-	-	-	-	-	-	-
Rhys Marshall	4	-	-	-	-	-	-	-
Tom Marshall	14	2	-	-	-	10	1	-
Damian McKenzie	16	-	7	9	-	41	1	-
Marty McKenzie	6	-	4	5	-	23	-	-
Liam Messam	14	3	-	-	-	15	1	-
Tim Nanai-Williams	9	2	-	1	-	13	-	-
Charlie Ngatai	11	6	-	-	-	30	-	-
Sean Polwart	1	-	-	-	-	-	-	-
Augustine Pulu	16	3	-	-	-	15	-	-
Brodie Retallick	8	1	-	-	-	5	-	-
Liam Squire	4	1	-	-	-	5	1	-
Matt Symons	14	-	-	-	-	-	1	-
Seta Tamanivalu	6	-	-	-	-	-	-	-
Ben Tameifuna	15	-	-	-	-	-	1	-
Siate Tokolahi	17	-	-	-	-	-	-	-
Maama Vaipulu	10	-	-	-	-	-	-	-
Brad Weber	17	-	-	-	-	-	-	-
Sonny Bill Williams	10	1	-	-	-	5	-	-
penalty try	-	3	-	-	-	15	-	-
Total	17	41	29	41	-	386	13	1
