= 2015 ITM Cup =

2015 rugby union competition in New Zealand

2015 ITM Cup season
- Countries: New Zealand
- Date: 13 August – 24 October
- Champions: Canterbury
- Runners-up: Auckland
- Promoted: Hawke's Bay
- Relegated: Manawatu
- Matches played: 76
- Tries scored: 498 (average 6.6 per match)
- Top point scorer: Tom Taylor (Canterbury); 144 points
- Top try scorer: George Moala (Auckland); 10 tries

Official website
- www.provincial.rugby

The 2015 ITM Cup season was the tenth season of New Zealand's provincial rugby union competition since it turned professional in 2006. The regular season began on August 13, when Southland hosted Auckland. It involved the top fourteen rugby unions of New Zealand. For sponsorship reasons, the competition was known as the ITM Cup and it was the sixth season under the lead sponsor. The winner of the Championship, Hawke's Bay was promoted to the Premiership, the seventh placed Premiership team, Manawatu was relegated to the Championship.

== Format ==
The ITM Cup standings were sorted by a competition points system. Four points were awarded to the winning team, a draw equaled two points, whilst a loss amounted to zero points. Bonus points were also awarded to teams who scored at least four tries in a match, or lost by seven points or fewer. Each team was placed on their total points received. If necessary of a tiebreaker, when two or more teams finish on equal points, the union who defeated the other in a head-to-head got placed higher. In case of a draw between them, the side with the biggest points deferential margin got rights to be ranked above. If they were tied on points difference, it was then decided by a highest scored try count or a coin toss. This seeding format was implemented since the beginning of the 2006 competition.

The competition included a promotion-relegation process with the winner of the Championship receiving automatic promotion to the Premiership, replacing the seventh-placed team in the Premiership which was relegated to the Championship for the following year. The regular season consisted of two types of matches. The internal division matches were when each team played the other six unions in their division once, home or away. The cross-division matches were when each team played four teams from the other division, thus missing out on three teams, each from the opposite division. Each union played home or away games against teams from the other division, making a total of ten competition games for each union. The finals format allowed the top four teams from each division move on to the semi-finals. The top two division winners, based on table points, received a home semi-final. In the first round of the finals, the semi-finals, the second division winner hosted the third division winner, and the first division winner hosted the fourth division winner. The final was hosted by the top remaining seed.

== Standings ==
Source: ITM Cup standings 2015

Premiership Division
#	Team	GP	W	D	L	PF	PA	PD	TB	LB	PTS
1	Canterbury	10	9	0	1	307	177	+130	6	1	43
2	Auckland	10	7	1	2	339	232	+107	5	2	37
3	Tasman	10	7	0	3	331	236	+95	7	0	35
4	Taranaki	10	6	0	4	290	175	+115	5	3	32
5	Counties Manukau	10	4	0	6	248	262	–14	5	2	23
6	RS – Waikato	10	4	0	6	225	281	–56	3	2	21
7	Manawatu	10	3	0	7	248	367	–119	5	2	19

Championship Division
#	Team	GP	W	D	L	PF	PA	PD	TB	LB	PTS
1	Hawke's Bay	10	7	1	2	302	219	+83	6	1	37
2	Wellington	10	6	1	3	304	178	+126	6	2	34
3	Otago	10	6	0	4	360	314	+46	7	1	32
4	Bay of Plenty	10	4	0	6	212	258	–46	2	1	19
5	North Harbour	10	3	0	7	212	294	–82	3	2	17
6	Southland	10	2	1	7	217	325	–108	1	3	14
7	Northland	10	0	0	10	143	420	–277	1	0	1

=== Standings progression ===
Premiership
Team	W1	W2	W3	W4	W5	W6	W7	W8	W9
Auckland	2 (4th)	7 (3rd)	8 (4th)	13 (4th)	23 (3rd)	27 (3rd)	28 (3rd)	33 (2nd)	37 (2nd)
Canterbury	5 (2nd)	9 (2nd)	14 (2nd)	19 (2nd)	24 (2nd)	28 (2nd)	33 (1st)	38 (1st)	43 (1st)
Counties Manukau	5 (3rd)	6 (4th)	6 (5th)	8 (6th)	8 (7th)	13 (6th)	18 (5th)	23 (5th)	23 (5th)
Manawatu	2 (5th)	3 (6th)	3 (7th)	3 (7th)	9 (6th)	9 (7th)	14 (7th)	14 (7th)	19 (7th)
Taranaki	1 (6th)	2 (7th)	4 (6th)	13 (3rd)	18 (4th)	23 (4th)	27 (4th)	32 (3rd)	32 (4th)
Tasman	5 (1st)	10 (1st)	15 (1st)	20 (1st)	25 (1st)	30 (1st)	30 (2nd)	30 (4th)	35 (3rd)
Waikato	0 (7th)	4 (5th)	9 (3rd)	10 (5th)	14 (5th)	14 (5th)	16 (6th)	16 (6th)	21 (6th)
Championship
Team	W1	W2	W3	W4	W5	W6	W7	W8	W9
Bay of Plenty	4 (2nd)	4 (4th)	8 (3rd)	13 (3rd)	13 (3rd)	14 (3rd)	19 (3rd)	19 (4th)	19 (4th)
Hawke's Bay	5 (1st)	10 (1st)	15 (1st)	20 (1st)	20 (1st)	24 (1st)	28 (1st)	35 (1st)	37 (1st)
North Harbour	0 (5th)	0 (7th)	4 (6th)	5 (6th)	9 (4th)	10 (6th)	10 (6th)	12 (6th)	17 (5th)
Northland	0 (7th)	0 (6th)	0 (7th)	0 (7th)	0 (7th)	0 (7th)	0 (7th)	0 (7th)	1 (7th)
Otago	0 (6th)	0 (5th)	5 (5th)	5 (5th)	7 (6th)	12 (5th)	17 (4th)	22 (3rd)	32 (3rd)
Southland	2 (4th)	6 (3rd)	7 (4th)	7 (4th)	8 (5th)	13 (4th)	13 (5th)	14 (5th)	14 (6th)
Wellington	4 (3rd)	9 (2nd)	14 (2nd)	19 (2nd)	19 (2nd)	21 (2nd)	25 (2nd)	32 (2nd)	34 (2nd)
The table above shows a team's progression throughout the season. For each week, their cumulative points total is shown with the overall division log position in brackets.
Key:	Win	Draw	Loss	Bye					

== Regular season ==
The 2015 ITM Cup was played across nine weeks with every team playing one Wednesday night fixture in a double-up round where they played twice that week. The competition started on Thursday, August 13, with Southland taking on Auckland at Rugby Park Stadium. The last matchup of the beginning week saw Hawke's Bay host Northland for the competitions first Ranfurly Shield defense.

=== Week 1 ===
13 August 2015
19:35 NZST

Southland	23–23	Auckland
Try: Kieran Moffat 31'; Elliot Dixon 48'; Con: Ash Moeke (2/2) 32', 49'; Pen: Ash Moeke (3/5) 21', 44', 53'	Report	Try: Ben Lam 25'; George Moala 65'; Con: Jono Hickey (2/2) 26', 67'; Pen: Jono Hickey (3/4) 7', 14', 23'; Mitchell Hunt (0/1)

Rugby Park Stadium, Invercargill
Referee: Kane McBride

14 August 2015
18:05 NZST

Waikato	20–35	Tasman
Try: Shaun Stevenson 62'; Con: Damian McKenzie (0/1); Pen: Damian McKenzie (5/6) 8', 11', 21', 44', 51'	Report	Try: Liam Squire 32'; Shane Christie 36'; Pete Samu 57'; Jimmy Cowan 78'; Con: Marty Banks (3/4) 33', 37', 79'; Pen: Marty Banks (3/3) 16', 47', 75'; Cards: Marty Banks (yellow card) 61'

Waikato Stadium, Hamilton
Referee: Nick Briant

14 August 2015
20:05 NZST

Bay of Plenty	20–11	North Harbour
Try: Papa Wharewera 31'; Chase Tiatia (2) 59', 77'; Con: Nick Evemy (1/3) 60'; Pen: Nick Evemy (1/1) 40'	Report	Try: Junior Tofa-Va'a 9'; Con: Matt McGahan (0/1); Pen: Matt McGahan (0/2); Daniel Halangahu (2/2) 62', 64'

Baypark Stadium, Tauranga
Referee: Paul Williams

15 August 2015
14:35 NZST

Taranaki	14–19	Wellington
Try: Codey Rei 52'; Con: Marty McKenzie (0/1); Pen: Marty McKenzie (3/3) 47', 55', 77'; Cards: Kurt Baker (yellow card) 15'	Report	Try: Brad Shields 17'; Vaea Fifita 21'; Joe Hill 73'; Con: Jonny Bentley (2/3) 22', 74'; Cards: Brad Shields (yellow card) 55'

Yarrow Stadium, New Plymouth
Referee: Chris Pollock

15 August 2015
16:35 NZST

Otago	24–38	Canterbury
Try: Jack Wilson 18'; Joshua Dickson 49'; Matt Faddes 74'; Con: Fletcher Smith (3/3) 19', 50', 75'; Pen: Fletcher Smith (1/1) 14'; Cards: Jayden Spence (yellow card) 58'	Report	Try: Richie Mo'unga 29'; Reed Prinsep 33'; Ben Funnell 54'; Matt Todd 59'; Con: Tom Taylor (3/4) 31', 34', 55'; Pen: Tom Taylor (4/4) 1', 10', 16', 24'

Forsyth Barr Stadium, Dunedin
Referee: Michael Lash

16 August 2015
14:35 NZST

Counties Manukau	36–35	Manawatu
Try: Toni Pulu (3) 2', 5', 67'; Sam Henwood 25'; Jared Page 46'; Con: Piers Francis (4/5) 3', 6', 47', 68'; Pen: Piers Francis (1/2) 53'	Report	Try: Antonio Kiri Kiri (2) 13', 76'; Callum Gibbins 39'; Valentino Mapapalangi 74'; Toby Morland 80'; Con: Otere Black (5/5) 14', 40', 74', 77'; Pen: Otere Black (0/1)

ECOLight Stadium, Pukekohe
Referee: Brendon Pickerill

16 August 2015
16:35 NZST

RS – Hawke's Bay	39–10	Northland
Try: Tony Lamborn (2) 3', 48'; Michael Allardice 18'; Ash Dixon 24'; Ryan Tongia (2) 40', 53'; Con: Ihaia West (3/6) 4', 25', 54'; Pen: Ihaia West (1/2) 9'	Report	Try: Troy Gilbert 77'; Con: Daniel Hawkins (1/1) 78'; Pen: Daniel Hawkins (1/1) 30'

McLean Park, Napier
Referee: Shane McDermott

=== Week 2 ===
20 August 2015
19:35 NZST

North Harbour	0–43	Wellington
Pen: Daniel Halangahu (0/1); Cards: Nafi Tuitavake (yellow card) 50'	Report	Try: Shaun Treeby 26'; Joe Hill 35'; Vaea Fifita (2) 38', 58'; Penalty try 50'; Tomasi Alosio 73'; Con: Jonny Bentley (5/6) 27', 36', 51', 59', 74'; Pen: Jonny Bentley (1/2) 4'

North Harbour Stadium, Albany
Attendance: 4,500
Referee: Shane McDermott

21 August 2015
19:35 NZST

Tasman	34–13	Bay of Plenty
Try: Liam Squire 7'; Mitchell Scott 37'; Kieron Fonotia 69'; Pete Samu 79'; Con: Marty Banks (4/4) 8', 38', 70', 80'; Pen: Marty Banks (2/3) 41', 51'; Cards: Ross Geldenhuys (yellow card) 10'	Report	Try: Zak Hohneck 46'; Con: Nick Evemy (1/1) 47'; Pen: Nick Evemy (1/2) 11'; Daniel Hollinshead (1/1) 53'

Trafalgar Park, Nelson
Referee: Nick Briant

22 August 2015
14:35 NZST

Manawatu	21–28	Waikato
Try: Jason Emery 43'; Fraser Armstrong 51'; Nathan Tudreu 73'; Con: Otere Black (3/3) 44', 52', 74'; Cards: Hamiora Thomas (yellow card) 19'	Report	Try: Shaun Stevenson 1'; Loni Uhila 21'; Damian McKenzie 68'; Con: Damian McKenzie (2/3) 22', 69'; Pen: Damian McKenzie (3/3) 6', 12', 59'; Cards: Jordan Payne (yellow card) 34'; Tawera Kerr-Barlow (yellow card) 48'

Arena Manawatu, Palmerston North
Attendance: 5,176
Referee: Chris Pollock

22 August 2015
17:35 NZST

Northland	18–27	Southland
Try: Sam Nock 8'; Kurt Davies 71'; Con: Daniel Hawkins (1/2) 9'; Pen: Daniel Hawkins (2/2) 28', 48'; Cards: Matt Talaese (red card) 79'	Report	Try: Tim Boys 5'; Kieran Moffat 49'; Lolohea Loco 53'; Con: Lima Sopoaga (3/3) 6', 50', 54'; Pen: Lima Sopoaga (2/3) 18', 80'

Okara Park, Whangārei
Referee: Ben O'Keeffe

22 August 2015
19:35 NZST

Otago	22–39	Hawke's Bay
Try: Tony Ensor 20'; Michael Collins 74'; Joshua Dickson 78'; Con: Fletcher Smith (2/3) 75', 79'; Pen: Fletcher Smith (1/2) 49'	Report	Try: Michael Allardice 33'; Israel Dagg (3) 51', 60', 63'; Ihaia West 54'; Richard Buckman 69'; Con: Ihaia West (2/5) 34', 52'; Israel Dagg (1/1) 70'; Pen: Ihaia West (1/1) 13'

Forsyth Barr Stadium, Dunedin
Referee: Richard Kelly

23 August 2015
14:35 NZST

Auckland	30–24	Taranaki
Try: Ben Lam 16'; George Moala 34'; Simon Hickey 46'; Rieko Ioane 78'; Con: Jono Hickey (2/4) 17', 35'; Pen: Jono Hickey (2/2) 14', 26'	Report	Try: Sean Wainui 31'; Charlie Ngatai 47'; Con: Marty McKenzie (1/2) 32'; Pen: Marty McKenzie (3/3) 8', 39', 71'; Codey Rei (1/3) 30'

Eden Park, Auckland
Attendance: 4,300
Referee: Mike Fraser

23 August 2015
16:35 NZST

Canterbury	20–15	Counties Manukau
Try: Luke Whitelock 50'; Con: Tom Taylor (0/1); Pen: Tom Taylor (5/6) 28', 37', 43', 62', 69'	Report	Try: Jared Page 20'; Sam Vaka 65'; Con: Piers Francis (1/2) 65'; Pen: Piers Francis (1/1) 58'; Cards: Pauliasi Manu (yellow card) 42'

Rugby League Park, Christchurch
Referee: Glen Jackson

=== Week 3 ===
26 August 2015
19:35 NZST

Bay of Plenty	26–10	Southland
Try: Te Rangi Fraser 50'; Chase Tiatia 63'; Con: Daniel Hollinshead (2/2) 51', 64'; Pen: Nick Evemy (3/6) 5', 14', 25'; Daniel Hollinshead (1/1) 44'	Report	Try: Bill Fukofuka 47'; Con: Ash Moeke (1/1) 48'; Pen: Ash Moeke (1/3) 27'

Baypark Stadium, Tauranga
Referee: Mike Fraser

27 August 2015
19:35 NZST

Tasman	41–21	Manawatu
Try: Quentin MacDonald 14'; Pete Samu (2) 25', 61'; Jimmy Cowan 66'; Con: Marty Banks (3/4) 15', 62', 67'; Pen: Marty Banks (5/6) 10', 29', 38', 56', 60'; Cards: Shane Christie (yellow card) 68'		Try: Kayne Hammington 11'; Semisi Masirewa 48'; Penalty try 68'; Con: Otere Black (3/3) 12', 49', 69'; Pen: Otere Black (0/2)

Lansdowne Park, Blenheim
Referee: Glen Jackson

28 August 2015
19:35 NZST

Counties Manukau	11–35	Hawke's Bay
Try: Ma'ama Vaipulu 68'; Con: Piers Francis (0/1); Pen: Piers Francis (2/2) 18', 42'	Report	Try: Mark Abbott 30'; Andrew Horrell 34'; Zac Guildford 48'; Shannan Chase 75'; Con: Ihaia West (3/3) 31', 35', 49'; Israel Dagg (0/1); Pen: Ihaia West (3/3) 5', 23', 45'

ECOLight Stadium, Pukekohe
Referee: Akihisa Aso (Japan)

29 August 2015
14:35 NZST

Auckland	21–27	Canterbury
Try: Akira Ioane 25'; George Moala 56'; Con: Simon Hickey (1/2) 57'; Pen: Simon Hickey (2/2) 11', 63'; Jono Hickey (1/1) 68'	Report	Try: Ryan Crotty 14'; Johnny McNicholl (2) 36', 60'; Daniel Lienert-Brown 35'; Con: Tom Taylor (2/4) 15', 36'; Pen: Tom Taylor (1/1) 70'; Cards: Ben Funnell (yellow card) 78'

Eden Park, Auckland
Attendance: 5,480
Referee: Chris Pollock

29 August 2015
17:35 NZST

Taranaki	27–34	Otago
Try: Jackson Ormond 12'; Iopu Iopu-Aso 17'; Codey Rei 35'; Sean Wainui 67'; Con: Codey Rei (2/4) 13', 36'; Pen: Codey Rei (1/1) 4'; Cards: Mitchell Graham (yellow card) 29'	Report	Try: Naulia Dawai (2) 51', 60'; Aki Seiuli 72'; Kaide Whiting 80'; Con: Fletcher Smith (2/2) 52', 61'; Peter Breen (2/2) 73', 80'; Pen: Fletcher Smith (2/3) 10', 30'

Yarrow Stadium, New Plymouth
Referee: Jamie Nutbrown

29 August 2015
19:35 NZST

Wellington	29–0	Northland
Try: Wes Goosen 5'; Joe Hill 24'; Ardie Savea 42'; Jackson Garden-Bachop 76'; Con: Jonny Bentley (3/4) 6', 25', 77'; Pen: Jonny Bentley (1/1) 10'	Report

Wellington Regional Stadium, Wellington
Attendance: 2,389
Referee: Cameron Stone

30 August 2015
14:35 NZST

Bay of Plenty	10–43	Waikato
Try: Joe Tupe 73'; Con: Daniel Hollinshead (1/1) 74'; Pen: Daniel Hollinshead (1/1) 5'; Cards: Culum Retallick (yellow card) 25'	Report	Try: Brad Weber (2) 19', 38'; Michael Mayhew 22'; Jordan Payne 50'; Zane Kapeli 55'; James Tucker 77'; Con: Damian McKenzie (5/6) 20', 23', 39', 51', 78'; Pen: Damian McKenzie (1/1) 34'

Tauranga Domain, Tauranga
Referee: Mike Fraser

30 August 2015
16:35 NZST

Southland	25–26	North Harbour
Try: Junior Ngaluafe 4'; Willis Halaholo (2) 9', 35'; Con: Ash Moeke (2/3) 10', 36'; Pen: Ash Moeke (2/2) 27', 57'	Report	Try: Tevita Li 17'; Michael Little 52'; Con: Daniel Halangahu (2/2) 18', 53'; Pen: Daniel Halangahu (4/6) 38', 42', 60', 80'

Rugby Park Stadium, Invercargill
Referee: Brett Johnson

=== Week 4 ===
2 September 2015
19:35 NZST

Taranaki	17–10	Counties Manukau
Try: Seta Tamanivalu 44'; Kurt Baker 61'; Con: Codey Rei (2/2) 45', 62'; Pen: Codey Rei (1/4) 38'	Report	Try: Ma'ama Vaipulu 71'; Con: Jared Page (1/1) 72'; Pen: Piers Francis (1/2) 10'; Cards: Ma'ama Vaipulu (yellow card) 37'

Yarrow Stadium, New Plymouth
Referee: Nick Briant

3 September 2015
19:35 NZST

Manawatu	7–57	Canterbury
Try: Fraser Stone 38'; Con: Otere Black (1/1) 39'	Report	Try: Marshall Suckling (2) 1', 59'; Mitchell Drummond 3'; Rob Thompson (3) 7', 69', 74'; Dominic Bird 18'; Ben Funnell 29'; Johnny McNicholl 33'; Con: Tom Taylor (6/9) 4', 8', 19', 30', 70', 75'

Arena Manawatu, Palmerston North
Referee: Akihisa Aso (Japan)

4 September 2015
19:35 NZST

Otago	17–34	Tasman
Try: Adam Knight 29'; Tom Franklin 34'; Charlie O'Connell 72'; Con: Fletcher Smith (1/3) 35'; Pen: Fletcher Smith (0/1)	Report	Try: Billy Guyton 1'; Mitchell Scott 24'; Marco Kotze 40'; Robbie Malneek 43'; Con: Marty Banks (4/4) 2', 25', 40', 44'; Pen: Marty Banks (2/3) 11', 39'

Forsyth Barr Stadium, Dunedin
Referee: Paul Williams

5 September 2015
14:35 NZST

Waikato	28–50	Auckland
Try: Damian McKenzie 6'; Brad Weber 37'; Anton Lienert-Brown 39'; Shaun Stevenson 64'; Con: Damian McKenzie (4/4) 7', 38', 40', 65'	Report	Try: Michael Fatialofa 16'; Kaito Shigeno 22'; Ben Lam 51'; Taleni Seu 54'; Melani Nanai 60'; George Moala 71'; Mitchell Hunt 78'; Con: Simon Hickey (5/6) 17', 23', 52', 55', 60'; Jono Hickey (1/1) 79'; Pen: Simon Hickey (1/3) 33'; Cards: Akira Ioane (yellow card) 39'

Waikato Stadium, Hamilton
Referee: Mike Fraser

5 September 2015
17:35 NZST

Southland	3–53	Wellington
Pen: Ash Moeke (1/1) 8'; Cards: Jamie Mackintosh (yellow card) 15'	Report	Try: Jeremy Thrush (3) 5', 37', 58'; Jonny Bentley 47'; Leni Apisai 50'; Vaea Fifita 62'; Tomasi Alosio 69'; Tomasi Palu 79'; Con: Jonny Bentley (3/4) 6', 48', 51'; Jackson Garden-Bachop (2/4) 63', 70'; Pen: Jonny Bentley (1/2) 21'; Cards: Ardie Savea (yellow card) 15'

Rugby Park Stadium, Invercargill
Referee: Angus Mabey

5 September 2015
19:35 NZST

RS – Hawke's Bay	48–32	North Harbour
Try: Ryan Tongia 10'; Israel Dagg 22'; Richard Buckman 42'; Brendon O'Connor 51'; Ash Dixon 55'; Chris Eaton 77'; Con: Ihaia West (6/6) 11', 23', 43', 52', 56', 78'; Pen: Ihaia West (2/2) 3', 8'	Report	Try: Tevita Li (2) 14', 79'; Michael Little 26'; Jordan Manihera 67'; Penalty try 75'; Con: Daniel Halangahu (1/2) 27'; Matt McGahan (1/3) 76'; Pen: Daniel Halangahu (1/4) 39'

McLean Park, Napier
Referee: Glen Jackson

6 September 2015
14:35 NZST

Northland	7–50	Taranaki
Try: Daniel Hawkins 60'; Con: Daniel Hawkins (1/1) 60'	Report	Try: Penalty try 21'; Toa Halafihi 37'; Charlie Ngatai (2) 39', 63'; Seta Tamanivalu 73'; Latu Vaeno (2) 76', 80'; Con: Codey Rei (6/7) 22', 38', 40', 64', 77', 80'; Pen: Codey Rei (1/2) 43'

Okara Park, Whangārei
Referee: Brendon Pickerill

6 September 2015
16:35 NZST

Counties Manukau	26–37	Bay of Plenty
Try: Sione Fifita 17'; Richard Judd (2) 48', 75'; Sikeli Nabou 78'; Con: Jared Page (3/4) 49', 76', 79'; Pen: Jared Page (0/1)	Report	Try: Chase Tiatia 2'; Shahn Eru 14'; Te Aihe Toma 26'; Te Rangi Fraser 30'; Whaimotu Craft-Chemis 70'; Con: Daniel Hollinshead (3/5) 3', 15', 71'; Pen: Daniel Hollinshead (2/2) 37', 43'; Cards: Johan Bardoul (yellow card) 48'

ECOLight Stadium, Pukekohe
Referee: Richard Kelly

=== Week 5 ===
9 September 2015
19:35 NZST

Auckland	45–28	Manawatu
Try: George Moala 9'; Ben Lam (2) 20', 58'; Jono Owen 25'; Rieko Ioane 77'; Con: Simon Hickey (3/4) 10', 21', 26'; Mitchell Hunt (1/1) 78'; Pen: Simon Hickey (3/3) 2', 6', 40'; Jono Hickey (1/1) 75'	Report	Try: Callum Gibbins 30'; Valentino Mapapalangi 42'; Semisi Masirewa 57'; Fraser Stone 72'; Con: Otere Black (4/4) 30', 43', 57', 73'

Eden Park, Auckland
Attendance: 2,400
Referee: Paul Williams

10 September 2015
19:35 NZST

Waikato	30–25	Southland
Try: Declan O'Donnell 35'; Brad Weber 44'; Dylan Collier 57'; Con: Damian McKenzie (3/3) 36', 45', 58'; Pen: Damian McKenzie (3/3) 12', 31', 79'	Report	Try: Keanu Kahukura 54'; Dillan Halaholo 65'; Kieran Moffat 72'; Con: Lima Sopoaga (2/3) 66', 73'; Pen: Lima Sopoaga (2/2) 20', 38'

Waikato Stadium, Hamilton
Referee: Shuhei Kubo (Japan)

11 September 2015
19:35 NZST

Wellington	17–36	Tasman
Try: Frae Wilson 25'; Jackson Garden-Bachop 42'; Wes Goosen 80'; Con: Jonny Bentley (1/3) 43'; Pen: Jonny Bentley (0/2)	Report	Try: Pete Samu 46'; Kieron Fonotia 62'; Marco Kotze 68'; Shane Christie 77'; Con: Marty Banks (2/3) 47', 69'; Trent Renata (0/1); Pen: Marty Banks (2/2) 3', 6'; David Havili (2/2) 57', 72'

Wellington Regional Stadium, Wellington
Attendance: 3,307
Referee: Kane McBride

12 September 2015
14:35 NZST

North Harbour	28–20	Counties Manukau
Try: Matt McGahan 24'; James Parsons 51'; Michael Little 75'; Con: Daniel Halangahu (2/3) 25', 52'; Pen: Daniel Halangahu (3/3) 44', 58', 72'; Cards: Chris Vui (yellow card) 61'	Report	Try: Sam Henwood 32'; Penalty try 67'; Con: Piers Francis (2/2) 33', 68'; Pen: Piers Francis (2/4) 28', 37'; Cards: Sam Vaka (yellow card) 58'

North Harbour Stadium, Albany
Referee: Will Houston (Australia)

12 September 2015
17:35 NZST

Bay of Plenty	9–32	Taranaki
Pen: Daniel Hollinshead (3/4) 6', 14', 46'	Report	Try: Bernie Hall 43'; Toa Halafihi 48'; Kurt Baker 52'; Seta Tamanivalu 71'; Con: Codey Rei (3/4) 49', 53', 72'; Pen: Codey Rei (2/2) 10', 62'; Cards: Mitchell Crosswell (yellow card) 29'

Rotorua International Stadium, Rotorua
Referee: Angus Mabey

12 September 2015
19:35 NZST

Canterbury	29–14	Hawke's Bay
Try: Rob Thompson 1'; Tulolo Tulolo 6'; Matt Todd 26'; Joe Moody 57'; Con: Tom Taylor (3/4) 2', 7', 58'; Pen: Tom Taylor (1/1) 13'	Report	Try: Shannan Chase 42'; Robbie Fruean 68'; Con: Ihaia West (2/2) 43', 69'

Rugby League Park, Christchurch
Referee: Brendon Pickerill

13 September 2015
14:35 NZST

Auckland	35–29	Otago
Try: Charles Piutau 8'; Mitchell Karpik 15'; Akira Ioane 26'; George Moala 51'; Con: Simon Hickey (3/4) 9', 16', 27'; Pen: Simon Hickey (3/3) 6', 39', 73'	Report	Try: Naulia Dawai (3) 32', 44', 47'; Jack Wilson 62'; Con: Fletcher Smith (0/3); Sio Tomkinson (0/1); Pen: Fletcher Smith (3/3) 2', 13', 19'

Eden Park, Auckland
Attendance: 3,900
Referee: Brett Johnson

13 September 2015
16:35 NZST

Manawatu	42–17	Northland
Try: Semisi Masirewa 4'; Nathan Tudreu (2) 12', 52'; Heiden Bedwell-Curtis 18'; Michael Alaalatoa 56'; Valentino Mapapalangi 67'; Con: Otere Black (5/5) 5', 13', 19', 53', 57'; Sam Malcolm (1/1) 68'; Pen: Sam Malcolm (0/1)	Report	Try: Dan Pryor 40'; Dave Thomas 60'; Con: Daniel Hawkins (2/2) 40', 61'; Pen: Daniel Hawkins (1/1) 44'

Arena Manawatu, Palmerston North
Referee: Ben O'Keeffe

=== Week 6 ===
16 September 2015
19:35 NZST

Tasman	39–20	North Harbour
Try: Jimmy Cowan 12'; Viliami Lolohea (3) 19', 42', 62'; Marty Banks 56'; Mitchell Scott 67'; Con: Trent Renata (2/3) 13', 20'; Marty Banks (1/3) 63'; Pen: Marty Banks (1/1) 79'	Report	Try: Nafi Tuitavake 27'; Michael Little 70'; Con: Daniel Halangahu (1/1) 28'; Matt McGahan (1/1) 71'; Pen: Daniel Halangahu (2/2) 24', 37'

Trafalgar Park, Nelson
Referee: Shuhei Kubo (Japan)

17 September 2015
19:35 NZST

Wellington	36–37	Otago
Try: Vaea Fifita 16'; Jeffery Toomaga-Allen (2) 40', 50'; Ardie Savea 71'; Con: Jason Woodward (2/4) 17', 72'; Pen: Jason Woodward (4/4) 9', 23', 58', 63'; Cards: Ardie Savea (yellow card) 75'	Report	Try: Mikaele Mafi 2'; Matt Faddes (2) 24', 79'; Naulia Dawai 77'; Con: Peter Breen (4/4) 3', 25', 78', 80'; Pen: Peter Breen (3/4) 7', 11', 20'

Wellington Regional Stadium, Wellington
Attendance: 1,655
Referee: Will Houston (Australia)

18 September 2015
19:35 NZST

Taranaki	41–0	Waikato
Try: Charlie Ngatai 35'; Seta Tamanivalu 38'; Angus Ta'avao 43'; Sean Wainui 60'; Hika Elliot 78'; Con: Codey Rei (4/4) 36', 39', 44', 61'; Marty McKenzie (1/1) 79'; Pen: Codey Rei (2/2) 4', 18'	Report	Pen: Damian McKenzie (0/1)

Yarrow Stadium, New Plymouth
Referee: Shane McDermott

19 September 2015
14:35 NZST

RS – Hawke's Bay	23–17	Bay of Plenty
Try: Ryan Tongia 16'; Tom Stanley 44'; Tony Lamborn 49'; Con: Ihaia West (1/3) 45'; Pen: Ihaia West (2/2) 35', 38'	Report	Try: Shahn Eru 25'; Nick Evemy 52'; Con: Nick Evemy (2/2) 26', 53'; Pen: Nick Evemy (1/3) 3'; Cards: Zak Hohneck (yellow card) 34'

McLean Park, Napier
Referee: Ben O'Keeffe

19 September 2015
17:35 NZST

Southland	49–14	Manawatu
Try: Michael Molloy 7'; Tim Boys 13'; Kieran Moffat 33'; Willis Halaholo 49'; Lima Sopoaga 58'; Tauasosi Tuimavave 72'; Con: Lima Sopoaga (4/5) 8', 34', 50', 59'; Scott Eade (1/1) 73'; Pen: Lima Sopoaga (3/4) 27', 55'	Report	Try: Heiden Bedwell-Curtis 19'; Rob Foreman 62'; Con: Otere Black (2/2) 20', 62'; Pen: Otere Black (0/1)

Rugby Park Stadium, Invercargill
Referee: Nick Briant

19 September 2015
19:35 NZST

Northland	17–42	Counties Manukau
Try: Waisea Lawebuka 71'; Con: Daniel Hawkins (0/1); Pen: Daniel Hawkins (4/5) 6', 14', 20', 38'; Cards: Josh Goodhue (yellow card) 15'; Sam Nock (yellow card) 59'	Report	Try: Cardiff Vaega 16'; Jordan Taufua (2) 25', 35'; Viliame Rarasea 60'; Frank Halai 75'; Con: Piers Francis (2/3) 17', 36'; Willie Walker (2/2) 61', 76'; Pen: Piers Francis (3/4) 10', 29', 41'

Okara Park, Whangārei
Referee: Liam Scanlon

20 September 2015
14:35 NZST

North Harbour	10–17	Canterbury
Try: Tevita Li 74'; Con: Matt McGahan (1/1) 75'; Pen: Matt McGahan (1/3) 46'	Report	Try: Johnny McNicholl 20'; Ben Funnell 37'; Con: Tom Taylor (2/2) 21', 38'; Pen: Tom Taylor (1/2) 63'

North Harbour Stadium, Albany
Referee: Cameron Stone

20 September 2015
16:35 NZST

Tasman	19–28	Auckland
Try: Joe Wheeler 50'; Con: Marty Banks (1/1) 51'; Pen: Marty Banks (4/5) 23', 32', 42', 65'; Cards: Trent Renata (yellow card) 37'	Report	Try: Joe Edwards 19'; George Moala 39'; Vince Aso 43'; Con: Simon Hickey (2/3) 20', 40'; Pen: Simon Hickey (2/2) 4', 26'; Mitchell Hunt (1/1) 67'; Cards: Jono Hickey (yellow card) 49'

Lansdowne Park, Blenheim
Referee: Jamie Nutbrown

=== Week 7 ===
23 September 2015
19:35 NZST

Canterbury	18–17	Waikato
Try: Ben Funnell 64'; Matt Todd 71'; Con: Tom Taylor (1/2) 65'; Pen: Tom Taylor (2/2) 17', 78'	Report	Try: Shaun Stevenson 7'; Damian McKenzie 31'; Con: Damian McKenzie (2/2) 8', 32'; Pen: Damian McKenzie (0/1); Drop: Damian McKenzie 74'; Cards: Ben Tameifuna (yellow card) 62'

Rugby League Park, Christchurch
Referee: Paul Williams

24 September 2015
19:35 NZST

RS – Hawke's Bay	17–12	Auckland
Try: Brendon Edmonds 35'; Ihaia West 64'; Con: Ihaia West (2/2) 36', 65'; Pen: Ihaia West (1/2) 9'	Report	Pen: Simon Hickey (4/6) 3', 23', 28', 40'

McLean Park, Napier
Referee: Nick Briant

25 September 2015
19:35 NZST

Northland	5–37	Bay of Plenty
Try: Daniel Hawkins 54'; Con: Daniel Hawkins (0/1); Pen: Daniel Hawkins (0/2)	Report	Try: Elijah Nicholas 42'; Penalty try 62'; Lalakai Foketi 74'; Keepa Mewett 79'; Con: Daniel Hollinshead (4/4) 43', 63', 75', 80'; Pen: Nick Evemy (3/3) 5', 12', 26'; Cards: Jono Kitto (yellow card) 57'; Joe Tupe (yellow card) 77'

Okara Park, Whangārei
Referee: Michael Lash

26 September 2015
14:35 NZST

Counties Manukau	42–33	Tasman
Try: Richard Judd 31'; Cardiff Vaega 36'; Sikeli Nabou 47'; Pele Cowley 67'; Onosai Auva'a 70'; Con: Piers Francis (2/3) 37', 48'; Willie Walker (2/2) 68', 71'; Pen: Piers Francis (3/5) 5', 25', 39'; Cards: Sam Henwood (yellow card) 78'	Report	Try: Kieron Fonotia 20'; Marty Banks 44'; Billy Guyton 72'; Con: Marty Banks (2/2) 21', 73'; David Havili (1/1) 45'; Pen: Marty Banks (2/5) 3', 11'; David Havili (2/2) 50', 54'; Cards: David Havili (yellow card) 22'; Robbie Malneek (yellow card) 27'

ECOLight Stadium, Pukekohe
Referee: Kane McBride

26 September 2015
17:35 NZST

Otago	61–7	Southland
Try: Michael Collins 3'; Liam Coltman 13'; James Lentjes 27'; Teihorangi Walden 36'; Peter Breen 40'; Josh Renton 60'; Jayden Spence 64'; Matt Faddes 68'; Con: Peter Breen (6/8) 4', 14', 28', 40', 61', 69'; Pen: Peter Breen (2/2) 22', 55'; Drop: Peter Breen 19'	Report	Try: Willis Halaholo 8'; Con: Lima Sopoaga (1/1) 9'; Cards: Jamie Mackintosh (red card) 24'

Forsyth Barr Stadium, Dunedin
Referee: Jamie Nutbrown

26 September 2015
19:35 NZST

Manawatu	31–17	North Harbour
Try: Fraser Stone 38'; Callum Gibbins (2) 50', 79'; Newton Tudreu 56'; Con: Otere Black (4/4) 39', 51', 57', 80'; Pen: Otere Black (1/2) 62'	Report	Try: Josh Rowland 32'; Matt McGahan 47'; Con: Bryn Hall (2/2) 33', 48'; Pen: Bryn Hall (1/2) 14'; Cards: Alex Woonton (yellow card) 61'

Arena Manawatu, Palmerston North
Referee: Ben O'Keeffe

27 September 2015
14:35 NZST

Waikato	14–21	Wellington
Try: Chauncy Edwardson 65'; Con: Damian McKenzie (0/1); Pen: Damian McKenzie (3/3) 6', 11', 80'	Report	Try: Jeremy Thrush 25'; Leni Apisai 56'; Con: Jason Woodward (1/2) 26'; Pen: Jason Woodward (3/4) 22', 32', 39'

Waikato Stadium, Hamilton
Referee: Brendon Pickerill

27 September 2015
16:35 NZST

Canterbruy	21–24	Taranaki
Try: Johnny McNicholl 14'; Marshall Suckling 50'; Con: Tom Taylor (1/2) 15'; Pen: Tom Taylor (3/3) 8', 35', 43'	Report	Try: Bernie Hall 5'; Kurt Baker 20'; Blade Thomson 46'; Con: Codey Rei (3/3) 6', 21', 47'; Pen: Codey Rei (1/2) 2'

Rugby League Park, Christchurch
Referee: Shane McDermott

=== Week 8 ===
30 September 2015
19:35 NZST

Wellington	22–22	Hawke's Bay
Try: Jason Woodward 19'; Reggie Goodes 35'; Vaea Fifita 52'; Con: Jason Woodward (2/3) 20', 53'; Pen: Jason Woodward (1/2) 29'; Cards: Jason Woodward (yellow card) 54'	Report	Try: Chris Eaton 10'; Brendon O'Connor 44'; Robbie Fruean 78'; Con: Ihaia West (2/3) 11', 45'; Pen: Ihaia West (1/2) 65'; Cards: Chris Eaton (yellow card) 26'

Wellington Regional Stadium, Wellington
Attendance: 2,986
Referee: Brendon Pickerill

1 October 2015
19:35 NZST

North Harbour	32–39	Otago
Try: Michael Little (2) 32', 78'; Nafi Tuitavake 45'; Pita Ahki 69'; Con: Daniel Halangahu (2/2) 33', 46'; Matt McGahan (1/2) 70'; Pen: Daniel Halangahu (2/2) 10', 58'	Report	Try: Peter Breen 18'; James Lentjes 37'; Jackson Hemopo 50'; Jack Wilson 67'; Con: Peter Breen (2/4) 51', 68'; Pen: Peter Breen (5/5) 5', 40', 42', 60', 64'

North Harbour Stadium, Albany
Referee: Brett Johnson

2 October 2015
19:35 NZST

Waikato	9–30	Counties Manukau
Pen: Damian McKenzie (3/5) 13', 54', 66'; Cards: Peni Iowane (yellow card) 71'	Report	Try: Jimmy Tupou 45'; Sione Fifita 58'; Jordan Taufua 75'; Frank Halai 79'; Con: Piers Francis (2/4) 46', 76'; Pen: Piers Francis (2/3) 8', 30'

Waikato Stadium, Hamilton
Referee: Richard Kelly

3 October 2015
14:35 NZST

Tasman	25–41	Canterbury
Try: David Havili 25'; Shane Christie (2) 68', 71'; Con: Marty Banks (1/1) 26'; Trent Renata (1/2) 69'; Pen: Marty Banks (1/3) 17'; David Havili (1/1) 49'	Report	Try: Matt Todd 28'; Rob Thompson (2) 37', 64'; Tom Taylor 42'; Cameron McIntyre 75'; Con: Tom Taylor (5/5) 29', 38', 43', 65', 76'; Pen: Tom Taylor (2/3) 18', 52'; Cards: Marshall Suckling (yellow card) 15'

Trafalgar Park, Nelson
Referee: Ben O'Keeffe

3 October 2015
17:35 NZST

Manawatu	10–44	Taranaki
Try: Callum Gibbins 44'; Con: Otere Black (1/1) 45'; Pen: Otere Black (1/1) 6'; Cards: Heiden Bedwell-Curtis (yellow card) 75'	Report	Try: Jackson Ormond 9'; Kurt Baker 12'; Toa Halafihi 35'; Charlie Ngatai 53'; Blade Thomson 63'; Con: Codey Rei (5/5) 10', 13', 36', 54', 66'; Pen: Codey Rei (1/1) 24'; Liam McBride (2/2) 69', 76'

Arena Manawatu, Palmerston North
Referee: Angus Mabey

3 October 2015
19:35 NZST

Auckland	64–21	Northland
Try: Akira Ioane (2) 5', 32'; George Moala (2) 15', 78'; Greg Pleasants-Tate 24'; Melani Nanai 39'; Lolagi Visinia 41'; Bryce Heem 53'; Mitchell Karpik 58'; Kurt Eklund 76'; Con: Simon Hickey (5/6) 6', 16', 25', 33', 40'; Jono Hickey (1/2) 54'; Calvary Fonoti (1/2) 79'	Report	Try: Warren Dunn (2) 49', 62'; Michael Stolberg 72'; Con: Daniel Hawkins (3/3) 50', 63', 73'

Eden Park, Auckland
Attendance: 2,000
Referee: Jamie Nutbrown

4 October 2015
14:35 NZST

Southland	28–35	Hawke's Bay
Try: Willis Halaholo 13'; Guy Millar 24'; Michael Molloy 66'; Con: Lima Sopoaga (2/3) 25', 67'; Pen: Lima Sopoaga (3/3) 5', 35', 57'	Report	Try: Robbie Fruean 39'; Mason Emerson 43'; Ryan Tongia (2) 47', 61'; Con: Tyrone Elkington-MacDonald (3/4) 40', 44', 48'; Pen: Tyrone Elkington-MacDonald (3/4) 9', 19', 59'

Rugby Park Stadium, Invercargill
Referee: Shane McDermott

4 October 2015
16:35 NZST

Bay of Plenty	13–31	Wellington
Try: Johan Bardoul 27'; Con: Daniel Hollinshead (1/1) 28'; Pen: Daniel Hollinshead (2/4) 1', 53'	Report	Try: Jeremy Thrush (2) 8', 14'; Ardie Savea 41'; Cory Jane 66'; Tomasi Alosio 76'; Con: Jackson Garden-Bachop (1/3) 15'; Jonny Bentley (2/2) 67', 77'; Cards: Jeffery Toomaga-Allen (yellow card) 52'; Ben May (yellow card) 57'

Baypark Stadium, Tauranga
Referee: Michael Lash

=== Week 9 ===
7 October 2015
19:35 NZST

Northland	36–54	Otago
Try: Shane Neville 24'; Dave Thomas 40'; Kara Pryor 63'; Kurt Davies 67'; Matt Moulds 75'; Jordan Hyland 80'; Con: Daniel Hawkins (1/3) 25'; Tyler Lansdowne (2/3) 76', 80'	Report	Try: Michael Collins (2) 15', 71'; Fletcher Smith 20'; Tony Ensor (2) 27', 58'; James Lentjes (2) 35', 46'; Kaide Whiting 55'; Con: Fletcher Smith (4/7) 16', 28', 47', 59'; Peter Breen (0/1); Pen: Fletcher Smith (2/4) 9', 43'; Cards: Fletcher Smith (yellow card) 73'

Okara Park, Whangārei
Referee: Liam Scanlon

8 October 2015
19:35 NZST

Taranaki	17–35	Tasman
Try: Jackson Ormond 7'; Bernie Hall 73'; Con: Codey Rei (1/1) 8'; Liam McBride (1/1) 74'; Pen: Codey Rei (0/2); Charlie Ngatai (1/1) 48'	Report	Try: Quentin MacDonald 53'; Vernon Fredericks 65'; Liam Squire 68'; Kieron Fonotia 76'; Con: David Havili (3/4) 54', 66', 69'; Pen: Trent Renata (2/3) 3', 79'; David Havili (1/1) 61'

Yarrow Stadium, New Plymouth
Referee: Kane McBride

9 October 2015
19:35 NZST

Hawke's Bay	30–36	Waikato – RS
Try: Ash Dixon 18'; Brendon O'Connor (2) 39', 80'; Lewis Marshall 78'; Con: Ihaia West (2/4) 40', 78'; Pen: Ihaia West (2/3) 13', 57'; Cards: Zac Guildford (yellow card) 22'	Report	Try: Anton Lienert-Brown 2'; Josh Hohneck 34'; Brad Weber (3) 49', 69', 72'; Con: Damian McKenzie (4/5) 3', 35', 50', 73'; Pen: Damian McKenzie (1/2) 24'; Cards: Ben Tameifuna (yellow card) 77'

McLean Park, Napier
Referee: Nick Briant

10 October 2015
14:35 NZST

Canterbury	39–20	Southland
Try: Ryan Crotty 18'; Johnny McNicholl 22'; Rob Thompson (2) 49', 56'; Tom Sanders 63'; Con: Richie Mo'unga (4/5) 19', 23', 50', 57'; Pen: Richie Mo'unga (2/2) 6', 10'	Report	Try: Dillan Halaholo 27'; Michael Molloy 37'; Con: Lima Sopoaga (2/2) 28', 38'; Pen: Lima Sopoaga (2/2) 31', 45'

Rugby League Park, Christchurch
Referee: Ben O'Keeffe

10 October 2015
17:35 NZST

Wellington	33–39	Manawatu
Try: Ardie Savea 4'; Jason Woodward 19'; Jeffery Toomaga-Allen 62'; Reggie Goodes 72'; Cory Jane 75'; Con: Jason Woodward (4/5) 20', 63', 73', 76'; Pen: Jason Woodward (0/1)	Report	Try: Callum Gibbins 1'; Heiden Bedwell-Curtis 9'; Toby Morland 13'; Nathan Tudreu 58'; Newton Tudreu 66'; Con: Otere Black (4/5) 2', 10', 59', 67'; Pen: Otere Black (2/3) 33', 49'

Wellington Regional Stadium, Wellington
Attendance: 4,916
Referee: Brett Johnson

10 October 2015
19:35 NZST

Counties Manukau	16–31	Auckland
Try: Ma'ama Vaipulu (2) 23', 48'; Con: Piers Francis (0/2); Pen: Piers Francis (2/4) 38', 59'	Report	Try: Bryce Heem (3) 14', 54', 80'; Con: Simon Hickey (1/2) 55'; Jono Hickey (1/1) 80'; Pen: Simon Hickey (1/2) 45'; Jono Hickey (3/4) 64', 67', 71'

ECOLight Stadium, Pukekohe
Referee: Paul Williams

11 October 2015
14:35 NZST

North Harbour	36–12	Northland
Try: Pita Ahki 17'; James Parsons (2) 21', 46'; Raymond Niuia 72'; Nafi Tuitavake 78'; Con: Daniel Halangahu (3/4) 18', 22', 47'; Matt McGahan (1/1) 79'; Pen: Daniel Halangahu (1/1) 35'	Report	Try: Mathew Wright 39'; Isimeli Taqea 55'; Con: Daniel Hawkins (1/2) 40'

North Harbour Stadium, Albany
Referee: Jamie Nutbrown

11 October 2015
16:35 NZST

Otago	43–30	Bay of Plenty
Try: Naulia Dawai 4'; Matt Faddes (2) 29', 43'; Tony Ensor 32'; Liam Coltman 40'; Fletcher Smith 50'; Con: Peter Breen (4/5) 30', 33', 40', 44'; Fletcher Smith (1/1) 51'; Pen: Peter Breen (1/1) 14'	Report	Try: Culum Retallick (2) 37', 56'; Nick Evemy 61'; Con: Daniel Hollinshead (1/1) 37'; Nick Evemy (2/2) 57', 62'; Pen: Daniel Hollinshead (3/3) 12', 17', 24'; Cards: Johan Bardoul (yellow card) 40'

Forsyth Barr Stadium, Dunedin
Referee: Richard Kelly

== Play-offs ==
Championship

Semi-finals
1	Hawke's Bay	33
4	Bay of Plenty	26
2	Wellington	34
3	Otago	14

Final
1	Hawke's Bay	26
2	Wellington	25

Premiership

Semi-finals
1	Canterbury	46
4	Taranaki	20
2	Auckland	44
3	Tasman	24

Final
1	Canterbury	25
2	Auckland	23

=== Semi-finals ===
==== Championship ====
17 October 2015
14:35 NZST

Hawke's Bay	33–26	Bay of Plenty
Try: Buckman 1' c O'Connor 45' c West 57' c Con: West (3/3) 2', 46', 58'; Pen: West (4/4) 16', 40', 68', 71'	Report	Try: Bardoul (3) 25' m, 32' m, 37' m Fraser 76' m Con: Evemy (0/3); Hollinshead (0/1); Pen: Evemy (1/1) 8'; Hollinshead (1/1) 61'

McLean Park, Napier
Referee: Brendon Pickerill

17 October 2015
19:35 NZST

Wellington	34–14	Otago
Try: Wilson 10' c Karawana 20' c Savea 54' c Bentley 78' c Con: Garden-Bachop (4/4) 11', 21', 55', 79'; Pen: Garden-Bachop (2/2) 6', 62'		Try: Lentjes 33' c Knight 73' c Con: Breen (1/1) 34'; Smith (1/1) 74'

Wellington Regional Stadium, Wellington
Attendance: 3,178
Referee: Paul Williams

==== Premiership ====
16 October 2015
19:35 NZST

Auckland	44–24	Tasman
Try: Ioane 8' c Lam 21' c Heem 47' c Nanai 54' c Moala 77' c Con: S. Hickey (4/4) 9', 22', 48', 55'; J. Hickey (1/1) 78'; Pen: S. Hickey (2/5) 15', 28'; J. Hickey (1/1) 65'	Report	Try: Fonotia 57' c Renata 67' c Ainley 71' c Con: Banks (3/3) 58', 67', 72'; Pen: Havili (1/3) 25'

Eden Park, Auckland
Attendance: 5,000
Referee: Ben O'Keeffe

17 October 2015
17:05 NZST

Canterbury	46–20	Taranaki
Try: Thompson (2) 34' c, 52' c Suckling 44' c Funnell 59' c Con: Taylor (4/4) 35', 45', 53', 60'; Pen: Taylor (6/6) 10', 13', 31', 38', 50', 70'; Cards: McNicholl (yellow card) 63'	Report	Try: Ormond 32' m Baker 48' m Penalty try 63' c Con: Rei (1/3) 63'; Pen: Rei (1/1) 17'

Rugby League Park, Christchurch
Referee: Nick Briant

=== Finals ===
==== Championship ====
23 October 2015
19:35 NZST

Hawke's Bay	26–25	Wellington
Try: Fruean 40' c Emerson 77' c Con: West (2/2) 40', 78'; Pen: West (4/4) 11', 15', 34', 45'	Report	Try: Wilson 1' c Jane (2) 29' c, 68' m Con: Garden-Bachop (2/3) 2', 30'; Pen: Garden-Bachop (2/3) 20', 27'

McLean Park, Napier
Referee: Nick Briant

==== Premiership ====
24 October 2015
19:35 NZST

Canterbury	25–23	Auckland
Try: Osborne 1' m Bird 8' c Crotty 17' c Con: Taylor (2/3) 9', 18'; Pen: Taylor (2/3) 44', 67'	Report	Try: Pleasants-Tate 14' c Karpik 46' c Con: S. Hickey (2/2) 15', 47'; Pen: S. Hickey (3/3) 22', 29', 41'

Rugby League Park, Christchurch
Referee: Ben O'Keeffe

FB	15	Tom Taylor
RW	14	Johnny McNicholl
OC	13	Ryan Crotty
IC	12	Rob Thompson
LW	11	Patrick Osborne
FH	10	Richie Mo'unga
SH	9	Mitchell Drummond
N8	8	Luke Whitelock (c)
OF	7	Matt Todd
BF	6	Reed Prinsep	(substituted off) 59'
RL	5	Dominic Bird
LL	4	Mitchell Dunshea	(substituted off) 70'
TP	3	Nepo Laulala	(substituted off) 69'
HK	2	Ben Funnell
LP	1	Daniel Lienert-Brown	(substituted off) 61'
Replacements:
HK	16	Ged Robinson
PR	17	Alex Hodgman	(substituted on) 61'
PR	18	Siate Tokolahi	(substituted on) 69'
LK	19	Ben Matwijow	(substituted on) 70'
FL	20	Tom Sanders	(substituted on) 59'
SH	21	Jack Stratton
FH	22	Cameron McIntyre
WG	23	Marshall Suckling

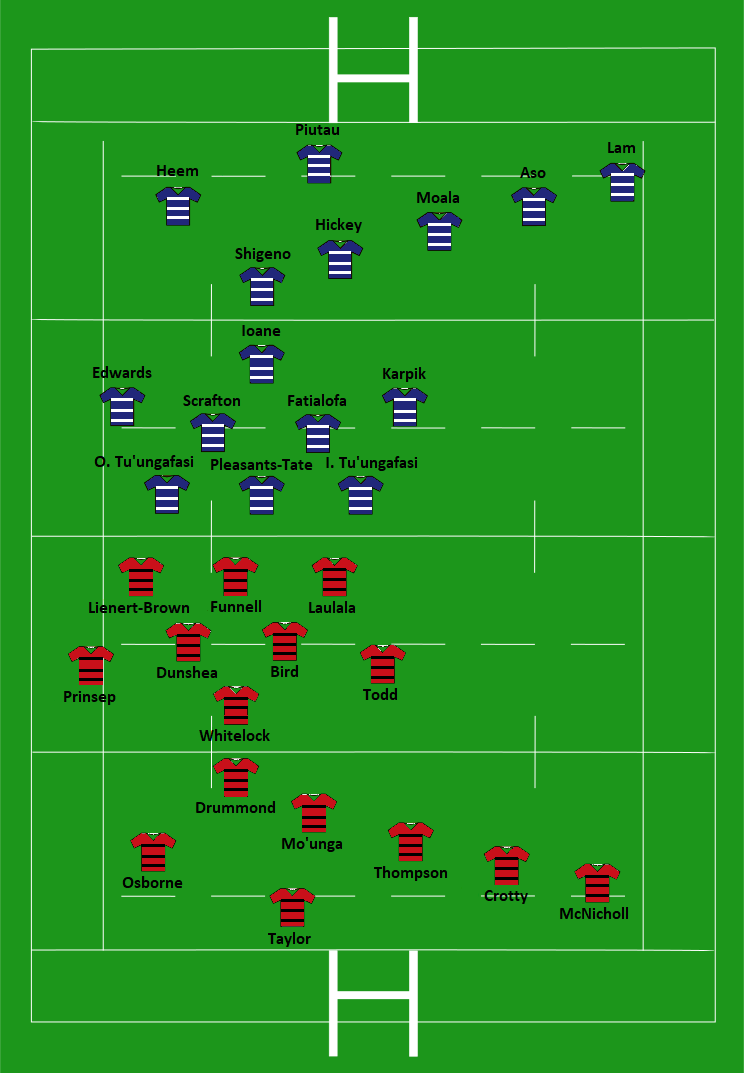

FB	15	Charles Piutau
RW	14	Bryce Heem
OC	13	Vince Aso		(substituted off) 63'
IC	12	George Moala
LW	11	Ben Lam
FH	10	Simon Hickey (c)
SH	9	Kaito Shigeno		(substituted off) 52'
N8	8	Akira Ioane
OF	7	Mitchell Karpik
BF	6	Joe Edwards
RL	5	Scott Scrafton	(yellow card) 7'	(substituted off) 72'
LL	4	Michael Fatialofa
TP	3	Ofa Tu'ungafasi
HK	2	Greg Pleasants-Tate		(substituted off) 61'
LP	1	Isileli Tu'ungafasi
Replacements:
HK	16	Kurt Eklund		(substituted on) 61'
PR	17	Tom McHugh
PR	18	Jono Owen
LK	19	William Lloyd		(substituted on) 72'
N8	20	Matthew Matich
SH	21	Jono Hickey		(substituted on) 52'
FH	22	Mitchell Hunt
FB	23	Lolagi Visinia		(substituted on) 63'

== Statistics ==
=== Leading point scorers ===
No.	Player	Team	Points	Average	Details
1	Tom Taylor	Canterbury	144	12.00	1 T, 29 C, 27 P, 0 D
2	Ihaia West	Hawke's Bay	134	11.17	3 T, 28 C, 21 P, 0 D
3	Marty Banks	Tasman	124	12.40	2 T, 24 C, 22 P, 0 D
4	Simon Hickey	Auckland	120	10.91	1 T, 26 C, 21 P, 0 D
5	Damian McKenzie	Waikato	115	11.50	3 T, 20 C, 19 P, 1 D
6	Codey Rei	Taranaki	97	8.82	2 T, 27 C, 11 P, 0 D
7	Peter Breen	Otago	84	8.40	2 T, 19 C, 11 P, 1 D
8	Piers Francis	Counties Manukau	77	8.56	0 T, 13 C, 17 P, 0 D
9	Otere Black	Manawatu	76	7.60	0 T, 32 C, 4 P, 0 D
10	Lima Sopoaga	Southland	69	11.50	1 T, 14 C, 12 P, 0 D

Source: The weekly reviews of the matches published on provincial.rugby (see "Report" in the individual match scoring stats).

=== Leading try scorers ===
No.	Player	Team	Tries	Average
1	George Moala	Auckland	10	0.83
2	Rob Thompson	Canterbury	10	0.83
3	Naulia Dawai	Otago	7	0.64
4	Brad Weber	Waikato	7	0.78
5	Matt Faddes	Otago	6	0.60
6	Vaea Fifita	Wellington	6	0.60
7	Callum Gibbins	Manawatu	6	0.67
8	Ben Lam	Auckland	6	0.55
9	Michael Little	North Harbour	6	0.60
10	Brendon O'Connor	Hawke's Bay	6	0.55

Source: The weekly reviews of the matches published on provincial.rugby (see "Report" in the individual match scoring stats).

=== Points by week ===
Team	1		2		3		4		5		6		7		8		9		Total		Average	
Auckland	23	23	30	24	21	27	50	28	80	57	28	19	12	17	64	21	31	16	339	232	33.90	23.20
Bay of Plenty	20	11	13	34	36	53	37	26	9	32	17	23	37	5	13	31	30	43	212	258	21.20	25.80
Canterbury	38	24	20	15	27	21	57	7	29	14	17	10	39	41	41	25	39	20	307	177	30.70	17.70
Counties Manukau	36	35	15	20	11	35	36	54	20	28	42	17	42	33	30	9	16	31	248	262	24.80	26.20
Hawke's Bay	39	10	39	22	35	11	48	32	14	29	23	17	17	12	57	50	30	36	302	219	30.20	21.90
Manawatu	35	36	21	28	21	41	7	57	70	62	14	49	31	17	10	44	39	33	248	367	24.80	36.70
North Harbour	11	20	0	43	26	25	32	48	28	20	30	56	17	31	32	39	36	12	212	294	21.20	29.40
Northland	10	39	18	27	0	29	7	50	17	42	17	42	5	37	21	64	48	90	143	420	14.30	42.00
Otago	24	38	22	39	34	27	17	34	29	35	37	36	61	7	39	32	97	66	360	314	36.00	31.40
Southland	23	23	27	18	35	52	3	53	25	30	49	14	7	61	28	35	20	39	217	325	21.70	32.50
Taranaki	14	19	24	30	27	34	67	17	32	9	41	0	24	21	44	10	17	35	290	175	29.00	17.50
Tasman	35	20	34	13	41	21	34	17	36	17	58	48	33	42	25	41	35	17	331	236	33.10	23.60
Waikato	20	35	28	21	43	10	28	50	30	25	0	41	31	39	9	30	36	30	225	281	22.50	28.10
Wellington	19	14	43	0	29	0	53	3	17	36	36	37	21	14	53	35	33	39	304	178	30.40	17.80

Source: ITM Cup Fixtures and Results 2015

=== Tries by week ===
Team	1		2		3		4		5		6		7		8		9		Total		Average	
Auckland	2	2	4	2	2	4	7	4	9	8	3	1	0	2	10	3	3	2	40	28	4.00	2.80
Bay of Plenty	3	1	1	4	3	7	5	4	0	4	2	3	4	1	1	5	3	6	22	35	2.20	3.50
Canterbury	4	3	1	2	4	2	9	1	4	2	2	1	4	5	5	3	5	2	38	21	3.80	2.10
Counties Manukau	5	5	2	1	1	4	5	7	2	3	5	1	5	3	4	0	2	3	31	27	3.10	2.70
Hawke's Bay	6	1	6	3	4	1	6	5	2	4	3	2	2	0	7	6	4	5	40	27	4.00	2.70
Manawatu	5	5	3	3	3	4	1	9	10	7	2	6	4	2	1	5	5	5	34	46	3.40	4.60
North Harbour	1	3	0	6	2	3	5	6	3	2	3	8	2	4	4	4	5	2	25	38	2.50	3.80
Northland	1	6	2	3	0	4	1	7	2	6	1	5	1	4	3	10	8	13	19	58	1.90	5.80
Otago	3	4	3	6	4	4	3	4	4	4	4	4	8	1	4	4	14	9	47	40	4.70	4.00
Southland	2	2	3	2	4	4	0	8	3	3	6	2	1	8	3	4	2	5	24	38	2.40	3.80
Taranaki	1	3	2	4	4	4	9	2	4	0	5	0	3	2	5	1	2	4	35	20	3.50	2.00
Tasman	4	1	4	1	4	3	4	3	4	3	7	5	3	5	3	5	4	2	37	28	3.70	2.80
Waikato	1	4	3	3	6	1	4	7	3	3	0	5	3	4	0	4	5	4	25	35	2.50	3.50
Wellington	3	1	6	0	4	0	8	0	3	4	4	4	2	1	8	4	5	5	43	19	4.30	1.90

For	Against

Source: The weekly reviews of the matches published on provincial.rugby (see "Report" in the individual match scoring stats).

=== Sanctions ===
Player	Team	Red	Yellow	Sent off match(es)
Jamie Mackintosh	Southland	1	1	vs. Wellington and Otago
Matt Talaese	Northland	1	0	vs. Southland
Ardie Savea	Wellington	0	2	vs. Southland and Otago
Ben Tameifuna	Waikato	0	2	vs. Canterbury and Hawke's Bay
Johan Bardoul	Bay of Plenty	0	2	vs. Counties Manukau and Otago
Marty Banks	Tasman	0	1	vs. Waikato
Kurt Baker	Taranaki	0	1	vs. Wellington
Brad Shields	Wellington	0	1	vs. Taranaki
Jayden Spence	Otago	0	1	vs. Canterbury
Nafi Tuitavake	North Harbour	0	1	vs. Wellington
Ross Geldenhuys	Tasman	0	1	vs. Bay of Plenty
Hamiora Thomas	Manawatu	0	1	vs. Waikato
Jordan Payne	Waikato	0	1	vs. Manawatu
Tawera Kerr-Barlow	Waikato	0	1	vs. Manawatu
Pauliasi Manu	Counties Manukau	0	1	vs. Canterbury
Shane Christie	Tasman	0	1	vs. Manawatu
Ben Funnell	Canterbury	0	1	vs. Auckland
Mitchell Graham	Taranaki	0	1	vs. Otago
Culum Retallick	Bay of Plenty	0	1	vs. Waikato
Ma'ama Vaipulu	Counties Manukau	0	1	vs. Taranaki
Akira Ioane	Auckland	0	1	vs. Waikato
Sam Vaka	Counties Manukau	0	1	vs. North Harbour
Chris Vui	North Harbour	0	1	vs. Counties Manukau
Mitchell Crosswell	Taranaki	0	1	vs. Bay of Plenty
Zak Hohneck	Bay of Plenty	0	1	vs. Hawke's Bay
Josh Goodhue	Northland	0	1	vs. Counties Manukau
Sam Nock	Northland	0	1	vs. Counties Manukau
Trent Renata	Tasman	0	1	vs. Auckland
Jono Hickey	Auckland	0	1	vs. Tasman
Jono Kitto	Bay of Plenty	0	1	vs. Northland
Joe Tupe	Bay of Plenty	0	1	vs. Northland
David Havili	Tasman	0	1	vs. Counties Manukau
Robbie Malneek	Tasman	0	1	vs. Counties Manukau
Sam Henwood	Counties Manukau	0	1	vs. Tasman
Alex Woonton	North Harbour	0	1	vs. Manawatu
Jason Woodward	Wellington	0	1	vs. Hawke's Bay
Chris Eaton	Hawke's Bay	0	1	vs. Wellington
Peni Iowane	Waikato	0	1	vs. Counties Manukau
Marshall Suckling	Canterbury	0	1	vs. Tasman
Heiden Bedwell-Curtis	Manawatu	0	1	vs. Taranaki
Jeffery Toomaga-Allen	Wellington	0	1	vs. Bay of Plenty
Ben May	Wellington	0	1	vs. Bay of Plenty
Fletcher Smith	Otago	0	1	vs. Northland
Zac Guildford	Hawke's Bay	0	1	vs. Waikato
Johnny McNicholl	Canterbury	0	1	vs. Taranaki
Scott Scrafton	Auckland	0	1	vs. Canterbury

== Ranfurly Shield ==
=== Pre-season challenges ===
Hawke's Bay won the Ranfurly Shield when they defeated Counties Manuaku in August 2014, and subsequently made four successful defenses. Hawke's Bay announced their first three defenses against Wairarapa Bush, Horowhenua-Kapiti, and Meads Cup winners Mid Canterbury after receiving six Heartland Championship offers.

In the first challenge, Hawke's Bay were missing players due to Super Rugby and international duties but managed to score forty-one unanswered second-half points which saw them safely retain the shield, winning 58–7 at McLean Park. Prop Jarvy Aoake scored from close range to open the scoring with their second try coming from fullback Zac Guildford and Tyrone Elkington-MacDonald kicked every conversion and penalty. Wairarapa Bush flanker Brock Price was awarded a try after chasing a kick downfield. Shannan Chase, Billy Ropiha, and Brendon O'Connor also scored tries with Jonah Lowe completing the scoring, in the final minute.

Again Hawke's Bay was missing players plus their coach also. Horowhenua-Kapiti were within four points with 15 minutes to play in Napier for the second Ranfurly Shield challenge. They dominated the opening half with Perry Hayman kicking three-from-three penalty shots at goal. Hawke's Bay although was in control with a dominant scrum and tries to Joseph Penitito and American Tony Lamborn. Sam Gardner scored for Horowhenua-Kapiti which brought the game back to within four points. But captain Antony Fox was then sent to the sin bin for a cynical infringement during a Hawke's Bay drive on his own try line which caused three Hawke's Bay penalties and tries to Shannan Chase, Tom Stanley and Mark Braidwood.

9 July 2015
14:35 NZST

Hawke's Bay	58–7	Wairarapa Bush
Try: Aoake 7' c Guildford (2) 20' c, 66' c Chase 46' c Ropiha 49' c Elkington-MacDonald 60' c O'Connor 63' m Lowe 79' m Con: Elkington-MacDonald (5/5) 9', 21', 48', 51', 61'; West (1/3) 67'; Pen: Elkington-MacDonald (2/2) 17', 43'	Report	Try: Price 31' c Con: Priest (1/1) 33'

McLean Park, Napier
Attendance: 4,500
Referee: Jamie Nutbrown

16 July 2015
19:35 NZST

Hawke's Bay	50–16	Horowhenua-Kapiti
Try: Penitito (2) 13' m, 39' m Lamborn 21' c Chase 75' c Stanley 78' c Braidwood 80' c Con: Elkington-MacDonald (4/6) 22', 76', 78', 80'; Pen: Elkington-MacDonald (4/4) 49', 66', 72', 74'	Preview; Report	Try: Gardner 61' c Con: Hayman (1/1) 63'; Pen: Hayman (3/3) 7', 33', 38'

McLean Park, Napier
Attendance: 3,000
Referee: Paul Williams

23 July 2015
19:35 NZST

Hawke's Bay	57–12	Mid Canterbury
Try: Chase 29' m Lowe (2) 55' m, 56' c O'Connor 65' c Lamborn 68' c Guildford 70' c Tongia 77' c Con: Elkington-MacDonald (0/1); West (5/6) 57', 66', 69', 71', 78'; Pen: Elkington-MacDonald (3/4) 13', 26', 49'; West (1/1) 54'	Report	Pen: Williams (4/4) 5', 38', 44', 45'

McLean Park, Napier
Attendance: 3,000
Referee: Brendon Pickerill

== See also ==
- 2015 Heartland Championship
