= Siate Tokolahi =

Tongan rugby union player (born 1992)

- Full name: Siate Folau Tokolahi
- Born: 16 March 1992 (age 34) Nukualofa, Tonga
- Height: 184 cm (6 ft 0 in)
- Weight: 116 kg (256 lb; 18 st 4 lb)
- School: St. Bede's College

Rugby union career
- Position: Prop
Senior career
Years	Team	Apps	(Points)
2014–2019	Canterbury	54	(0)
2015–2016	Chiefs	28	(0)
2017–2021	Highlanders	66	(15)
2020	Southland	9	(0)
- Correct as of 25 June 2023

Siate Tokolahi (born 16 March 1992) is a Tongan rugby union player who played as a prop for Canterbury and Southland in New Zealand's domestic Mitre 10 Cup and the Chiefs and Highlanders in the international Super Rugby competition.

== Early career ==
Born in Tonga, Tokolahi showed promise to become a top rugby player from an early age and was brought to New Zealand on a Sean Fitzpatrick scholarship to attend Sacred Heart College in Auckland. However, in 2009 aged 17 Tokolahi switched to St. Bede's College in Christchurch which made him eligible to play for Canterbury's youth sides. The move sparked controversy at the time and saw allegations of poaching leveled at the Canterbury Rugby Union. After graduating high-school, Tokolahi played for Canterbury's academy in 2012 and the Crusaders Knights development squad in 2013 while playing local club rugby for Belfast.

== Senior career ==
Tokolahi first made the Canterbury squad aged 22 in 2014, debuting in a 48-9 victory over perennial rivals Auckland in week 1 of the season. His ability to play in both the loosehead and tighthead prop positions saw him earn plenty of game time during his first year of provincial rugby and he ended up making 7 appearances, 2 starts and 5 from the bench as his side reached the ITM Cup semi-finals before losing out to Tasman.

2015 saw Canterbury back to winning ways, lifting the ITM Cup Premiership title after a 25-23 defeat of Auckland in Christchurch. Tokokahi was a key squad member, playing in 11 of the Cantabrians 12 games through the year with the majority of these appearances coming from the replacements bench as a result of stiff competition from the province's other front row forwards; Joe Moody, Nepo Laulala, Daniel Lienert-Brown and Alex Hodgman. However, in 2016, Tokolahi finally nailed down a regular spot in Canterbury's starting XV, starting 11 of the red and blacks 12 games during the year as they went on to retain their Mitre 10 Cup Premiership crown with a comprehensive 43-27 win over Tasman which secured their 8th domestic title in 9 years.

== Super Rugby ==
After just one season and seven games for Canterbury at domestic level, Tokolahi was named in the Hamilton-based Chiefs Super Rugby squad ahead of the 2015 season. He played every game during his first year in Hamilton as his team reached the tournament quarter-finals before losing out to New Zealand rivals, the Highlanders. Throughout 2015 Tokolahi largely played the role of second-half replacement, starting only 5 of 17 games and this was a trend that continued through 2016. Faced with fierce competition in the shape of; Mitchell Graham, Kane Hames, Hiroshi Yamashita and Atu Moli, Tokolahi could only manage 3 starts to complement 8 substitute appearances as the Chiefs got as far as the Super Rugby semi-finals before being knocked out by eventual champions, the Hurricanes.

Searching for a more regular starting role at Super Rugby level, Tokolahi switched franchises ahead of the 2017 Super Rugby season, leaving the Chiefs in favour of the Dunedin-based Highlanders, tournament winners in 2015, who were seeking front-row replacements for the departed Josh Hohneck and the injured Brendon Edmonds.

== Career Honours ==
Canterbury

- National Provincial Championship - 2015, 2016

== Super Rugby Statistics ==
As of 8 January 2017

Season	Team	Games	Starts	Sub	Mins	Tries	Cons	Pens	Drops	Points	Yel	Red
2015	Chiefs	17	5	12	546	0	0	0	0	0	0	0
2016	Chiefs	11	3	8	358	0	0	0	0	0	0	0
Total		28	8	20	904	0	0	0	0	0	0	0
