= Alex Hodgman =

New Zealand rugby union player

- Full name: Alexander Thomas O'Connor Atuolo Hodgman
- Born: 16 July 1993 (age 33) Auckland, New Zealand
- Height: 194 cm (6 ft 4 in)
- Weight: 122 kg (269 lb; 19 st 3 lb)
- School: Mount Albert Grammar School

Rugby union career
- Position: Prop
- Current team: QLD Reds
Senior career
Years	Team	Apps	(Points)
2014–2018	Canterbury	55	(10)
2015–2016	Crusaders	9	(5)
2017–2023	Blues	56	(0)
2019	Auckland	13	(0)
2024-2025	Reds	14	
International career
Years	Team	Apps	(Points)
2012	Fiji U20	5	(0)
2013	New Zealand U20	1	(0)
2020	New Zealand	4	(0)
2024	Australia	1	(0)

Alexander Thomas O'Connor Atuolo Hodgman (born 16 July 1993) is a New Zealand born rugby union player who has played as a prop for Canterbury and Auckland in New Zealand's domestic National Provincial Championship, in the Super Rugby competition and has also played international rugby for both New Zealand and Australia.

== Junior and provincial career ==
Born and raised in Auckland, Hodgman attended Mount Albert Grammar School in the city and was also a member of the Blues under-18 programme during that time.

Hodgman represented Fiji Under-20 at the 2012 IRB Junior World Championship in South Africa, however he changed allegiances ahead of the 2013 edition and turned out for New Zealand Under-20.

Although contracted for the side, Hodgman suffered a season-ending shoulder injury in 2013, so he debuted for Canterbury during the 2014 ITM Cup. He made 9 appearances during his first season at provincial level in what was a disappointing campaign overall for the Cantabrians. 2015 and 2016 were far more successful years which ended in Canterbury lifting the Premiership title and in 2016 adding the Ranfurly Shield to their list of honours.

== Super Rugby and international career ==
Impressive domestic performances saw Hodgman named in the Crusaders wider training group for the 2015 Super Rugby season where injuries to several front rowers allowed him to make 5 appearances during the campaign, including 1 start. He was subsequently promoted to a full contract for 2016, but was only able to add 4 more caps to his career total.

Seeking more game time, he headed back home to Auckland and signed for the Blues ahead of the 2017 Super Rugby season. Near the end of the season, following impressive performances, Hodgman played as a replacement for the Blues against the British and Irish Lions, coming on in the 57th minute for Ofa Tu'ungafasi, in the team's surprise 22–16 win against the Lions.

With All Blacks loosehead prop, Karl Tu'inukuafe, suffering from injuries in 2020, Hodgman was elevated to a starting role in the Blues during Super Rugby Aotearoa. At the end of Super Rugby, Hodgman was named in the South Island team, for the 2020 North vs South rugby union match. Although Hodgman did not play in the match due to a minor injury, he was selected for New Zealand's international team, the All Blacks, the following day.

Hodgman made his international debut for New Zealand on 8 October 2020, in a 27–7 win against Australia. Hodgman replaced an injured Joe Moody in the first half.

In a 2021 Blues game against the Highlanders, Hodgman was sent off, after receiving a red card. Though Hodgman started for the Blues in the Super Rugby Trans-Tasman final, he was not selected for the All Blacks in 2021.

In 2024 Hodgman moved to the Queensland Reds and was then selected for the Wallabies team to play Georgia at Sydney. He became the fourth player to represent both Australia and New Zealand, joining Des Connor, Ted Jessep and Owen Stephens. He was the first to do so in 50 years.

== Personal life ==
Hodgman has Fijian ancestry.

== Career Honours ==
Canterbury

- National Provincial Championship - 2015, 2016

== Super Rugby Statistics ==
As of 23 November 2016

Season	Team	Games	Starts	Sub	Mins	Tries	Cons	Pens	Drops	Points	Yel	Red
2015	Crusaders	5	1	4	155	0	0	0	0	0	0	0
2016	Crusaders	4	1	3	121	1	0	0	0	5	0	0
Total		9	2	7	276	1	0	0	0	5	0	0
