= Valentino Mapapalangi =

Tonga international rugby union player

- Full name: Valentino Mapapalangi
- Born: 18 July 1993 (age 33) Auckland, New Zealand
- Height: 1.94 m (6 ft 4 in)
- Weight: 112 kg (17 st 9 lb; 247 lb)
- School: Sacred Heart College

Rugby union career
- Position(s): Flanker, Number 8
Senior career
Years	Team	Apps	(Points)
2015–2016	Manawatu	16	(15)
2017–2019	Leicester Tigers	28	(0)
- Correct as of 19 May 2019
International career
Years	Team	Apps	(Points)
2016–2018	Tonga	8	(0)
- Correct as of 16 June 2018

Valentino Mapapalangi (born 18 July 1993) is a Tongan rugby union player. He plays in the number 8 and blind side position. He previously played for the England based Premiership Rugby side, Leicester Tigers. Mapapalangi also represents Tonga at international level.

== Early career ==
Mapapalangi was educated in Auckland, he attended Kelston Boys High School and Liston College both in West Auckland before attending Sacred Heart College in his final year. After graduating from high school, he spent 2 seasons in the Auckland youth structures before heading south to Waikato looking for further opportunity. 2 seasons spent in Waikato gave him the breakthrough he was looking for and he headed to Manawatu in 2015.

== Club career ==
After spending time with the Chiefs development squad in the early part of the year, Mapapalangi made the Manawatu squad ahead of the 2015 ITM Cup season and scored 3 tries in 9 appearances during the campaign. His performances attracted the attention of Super Rugby franchise, the Hurricanes who invited him to train with their wider training group during the 2016 Super Rugby pre-season.

The 2016 Mitre 10 Cup was less successful for both Mapapalangi and his side. The Turbos finished 5th in the Championship table while he made 7 appearances of which only 2 came from the start.

On 7 August 2017 Mapapalangi signed for Leicester Tigers in the Aviva Premiership. He made an impressive debut for Leicester on 16 September 2017 as a replacement for Joe Maksymiw in a 24–10 win against Gloucester at Welford Road. His first start came the next month in a 28–17 victory against London Irish at the Madejski Stadium. On 15 May 2019 he was announced as one of the players to leave Leicester following the end of the 2018-19 Premiership Rugby season.

== International career ==
Mapapalangi was called up to the Tonga squad ahead of the 2016 end-of-year rugby union internationals and earned his first cap as a second-half replacement in a 28–13 win over Spain on 12 November 2016.
