= Owen Stephens =

Australia & NZ international rugby union & league footballer

Personal information
- Full name: Owen George Stephens
- Born: 9 January 1947 (age 79) Paeroa, New Zealand

Playing information
- Height: 1.75 m (5 ft 9 in)
- Weight: 79 kg (12 st 6 lb)

Rugby union
- Position: Wing
Club
Years	Team	Pld	T	G	FG	P
≤1967–67	Club
≤1968–≥68	Athletic Rugby Club
≤1973–≥74	St. George
	Total	0	0	0	0	0
Representative
Years	Team	Pld	T	G	FG	P
1966–67	Bay of Plenty
1967–70	Wellington
≥1970–≤75	New South Wales
1968	New Zealand	1	0	0	0	0
1973–74	Australia	5	2	0	0	8

Rugby league
- Position: Wing
Club
Years	Team	Pld	T	G	FG	P
1970–≤73	Club
1975	Parramatta Eels	15	6	0	0	18
1975	Wakefield Trinity	8	7			21
1977	Parramatta Eels	1	1	0	0	3
	Total	24	14	0	0	42

Owen George Stephens (born 9 January 1947), also known by the nickname of "Noddy", is a New Zealand former rugby union and professional rugby league footballer who played in the 1960s and 1970s. He has the distinction of being one of only four players to have played international rugby union for both New Zealand and Australia.

== Early life and family ==
Stephens was born in Paeroa in 1947 and educated at Tauranga Boys' College. He is the son of Mortimer Stephens, a rugby league footballer who played in the 1930s for Auckland, St. Helens, Rochdale Hornets and Bradford Northern.

== Rugby union ==
A wing, Stephens played for Bay of Plenty and Wellington at a provincial level in New Zealand, and for the Athletic Rugby Club in Wellington. He won a single test cap for New Zealand, playing in the All Blacks' 19–12 victory over France at Eden Park, Auckland on 10 August 1968.

He left New Zealand in 1970 and switched codes to rugby league, but was not successful. He was reinstated back into rugby union while in Australia and played at club level for St. George, and represented New South Wales. He won five caps for Australia, playing against Tonga and Wales in 1973 and against New Zealand in 1974. Replacing Jeff McLean on the left wing, he was brought in for the second test against the All Blacks, on 1 June 1974 at Ballymore Oval, Brisbane. The match was drawn 16-all. He also played in the third on 8 June at the Sydney Cricket Ground which New Zealand won by 16 points to 6. He was only the second New Zealand international to subsequently represent another country against New Zealand.

== Rugby league ==
Owen Stephens then changed codes again to play club level rugby league.

In his career he played for St. George Dragons (trial), Parramatta Eels (two spells), and Wakefield Trinity, as a wing.

== Other dual internationals ==
Only four players have played rugby union at test match level for both New Zealand and Australia, the others being:

- Ted Jessep who played for New Zealand 1931–32 and for Australia in 1934.
- Des Connor who played for Australia 1958–59 and New Zealand 1961–64. He also coached Australia from 1968 to 1971.
- Alex Hodgman who played for New Zealand in 2020 and for Australia in 2024.

Bill Hardcastle also played for New Zealand (1897) and Australia in both rugby union (1899–1903) and rugby league (1910–14) but did not play a test match for New Zealand.
