= James Lentjes =

- Full name: James Anthony Richard Lentjes
- Born: 16 January 1991 (age 35) Christchurch, New Zealand
- Height: 188 cm (6 ft 2 in)
- Weight: 104 kg (16 st 5 lb; 229 lb)
- School: St. Bede's College

Rugby union career
- Position: Flanker
- Current team: Leeston Rugby Football Club
Senior career
Years	Team	Apps	(Points)
2014–2022	Otago	62	(80)
2015−2023	Highlanders	68	(35)
- Correct as of 18 July 2023

James Anthony Richard Lentjes (born 16 January 1991) is a former New Zealand rugby union player. His position was Flanker.

== Early career ==
Born and raised in the city of Christchurch in the South Island of New Zealand, Lentjes was educated at St Bede's College in his hometown where he won a Crusaders secondary schools title in 2008. After finishing school, he made his way through the Canterbury system, becoming a member of their wider training group in 2013 as well as playing for the Crusaders development team. He played club rugby in Canterbury with the university club, however due to a lack of opportunities to make the star studded Canterbury ITM Cup side, he headed south to Dunedin and began playing club rugby for Taieri. He holds a university degree in geology and geography and worked as a lab technician for Fulton Hogan prior to his rugby career.

== Senior career ==
His move to Dunedin quickly paid off and after one season in club rugby, he made the Otago squad for the 2014 ITM Cup and went on to play eight games in his debut season, scoring one try. Injuries restricted him to just 6 appearances in 2015, but in that time he managed to score 5 tries which helped his side reach the Championship semi finals before they were well beaten by Wellington. He was back to full fitness in 2016, featuring in 10 out of 12 matches for Otago during a season which saw them finish top of the championship standings - reaching the final before being defeated at home by North Harbour. In Round 8 of the 2021 Bunnings NPC Lentjes played his 50th game for Otago against Canterbury at Forsyth Barr Stadium, Otago winning in a thriller 22–20.

== Super Rugby ==
Following a string of injuries, Lentjes was called into the Highlanders squad midway through the 2015 Super Rugby season, making his debut in a 39–21 victory over the Stormers on March 28. He remained with the squad for the rest of the season and played in both the semi-final win over the Waratahs and the 21–14 victory over the Hurricanes in the final as the Highlanders won their first Super Rugby title.

He was named in the Highlanders squad for the 2016 Super Rugby season, however the form of fellow loose forwards Shane Christie, Gareth Evans and Dan Pryor meant he only made 4 appearances during the season as the Highlanders went down to the Lions in Johannesburg in the semifinals. He was a consistent performer for the side during the 2017, 2018 and 2019 seasons and was rewarded in 2020 - being named as the Highlanders captain, however his season was cut short in only his fourth game as he suffered a horrific ankle injury ruling him out for the rest of the year.
