= Ted Jessep =

Rugby player

- Born: Evan Morgan Jessep; 11 October 1904 Sydney, NSW, Australia
- Died: 10 January 1983 (aged 78) Sydney, NSW, Australia
- Height: 1.78 m (5 ft 10 in)
- Weight: 89 kg (196 lb)
- School: South Wellington School

Rugby union career
- Position(s): Hooker; Prop
Provincial / State sides
Years	Team	Apps	(Points)
1926–32	Wellington	46	
1933–38	Victoria		
International career
Years	Team	Apps	(Points)
1931–32	New Zealand	2	(0)
1934	Australia	2	(0)
Coaching career
- Years: Team
- 1940–55, 62–68: Eastern Suburbs (Sydney)

Evan "Ted" Morgan Jessep (11 October 1904 – 10 January 1983) was a rugby union player who has the distinction of being the first person to play in test matches for both New Zealand and Australia. Born in Sydney, Jessep moved to New Zealand with his family when he was three years old.

Jessep represented Wellington at a provincial level, and was a member of the New Zealand national side, the All Blacks, in 1931 and 1932. In all he played eight matches for the All Blacks including two internationals, both against Australia.

He was a hooker and prop, but played his first representative rugby at wing forward, for Wellington. When he played against Australia in 1930, it was the last time a 2-3-2 scrum was used.

Jessep subsequently returned to Australia, where he lived for the rest of his life. He represented Victoria from 1933 to 1938, when an ankle injury forced his retirement. He played two test matches as vice-captain for the Wallabies in 1934, both against New Zealand.

Jessep was the first man to play Test rugby for both New Zealand and Australia, an honour later achieved by Des Connor and Owen Stephens. But Jessep achieved another feat, one that will never be matched, having played in both the first New Zealand side (1931) and the first Australian side (1934) to win the Bledisloe Cup.

He later coached the Eastern Suburbs club for 21 seasons in the period 1940 to 1968, winning four Sydney premierships in the process.
