= Michael Allardice =

NZ rugby union player (born 1991)

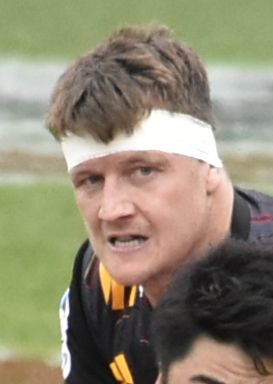
- Born: 19 October 1991 (age 35) Taihape, New Zealand
- Height: 200 cm (6 ft 7 in)
- Weight: 112 kg (247 lb; 17 st 9 lb)
- School: Palmerston North Boys' High School

Rugby union career
- Position: Lock
- Current team: Ricoh Black Rams
Senior career
Years	Team	Apps	(Points)
2012	Canterbury	1	(0)
2013–2019	Hawke's Bay	57	(20)
2015–2020	Chiefs	43	(0)
2021–2023	Toyota Verblitz	22	(5)
2023–2025	Red Hurricanes Osaka	21	(10)
2025–	Ricoh Black Rams	13	(0)
- Correct as of 21 January 2022

Michael Allardice (born 19 October 1991) is a New Zealand rugby union player who currently plays as a lock for Hawke's Bay in New Zealand's domestic Mitre 10 Cup and the Chiefs in the international Super Rugby competition.

== Early career ==
Born in the rural town of Taihape in the centre of New Zealand's north island in the Manawatū-Whanganui region, he moved to the area's biggest town, Palmerston North for school and attended Palmerston North Boys' High School where he played first XV rugby. Upon graduation, he moved south to Christchurch to study for a Bachelor of Commerce degree, majoring in marketing and business management at the University of Canterbury which he completed in 3 years.

== Senior career ==
While still studying in Christchurch, Allardice made 1 appearance for Canterbury during the 2012 ITM Cup, a 33–11 win over Auckland. In 2013 after completing his university studies he headed north to join the Hawke's Bay Magpies. He played every game for the Magpies as they reached the final of the ITM Cup championship before losing narrowly to Tasman. He continued to be a first choice lock in 2014, playing all 12 of the Magpies' games as they again lost in the Championship final, this time to Manawatu. Once more he was an ever-present in 2015 as Hawke's Bay finally won promotion to the Premiership with a 26–25 victory over Wellington in the final.

The 2016 New Zealand domestic season was a write-off for both him and his team, as injury meant he was ruled out of the entire campaign and the Magpies' stay in the Mitre 10 Cup Premiership proved to be a brief one as they were relegated to the Championship for 2017 after recording only 2 wins all season.

== Super Rugby ==
A pre-season training stint with the Chiefs ahead of the 2014 Super Rugby season opened up some doors for him in the franchise and he was subsequently named in their squad for 2015. Although injury curtailed his debut season prematurely, he still managed to make 7 appearances which were followed up by 10 more in 2016 as the Chiefs reached the competition's semi-final stage before going down to New Zealand rivals and eventual competition winners, the Hurricanes. Despite, injury problems in the latter half of 2016, he was retained in the squad for the 2017 Super Rugby season.

In August 2016, Allardice made headlines in New Zealand for alleged homophobic abuse of a gay couple during a post season team bonding at a pub and public swimming facility at Okoroire Hot Springs near Tirau in the Waikato. He later made a public apology. The incident came on the heels of a study that found more young Kiwi men hide their sexuality on the playing field than in any other country.

In 2019, Allardice resigned with the Chiefs.

== International ==
Allardice was a New Zealand Schools representative in 2009 and also turned out for New Zealand Universities during his time at the University of Canterbury.

== Career Honours ==
Canterbury

- Mitre 10 Cup Premiership - 2012

Hawke's Bay

- Mitre 10 Cup Championship - 2015

== Super Rugby Statistics ==
As of 17 December 2016

Season	Team	Games	Starts	Sub	Mins	Tries	Cons	Pens	Drops	Points	Yel	Red
2015	Chiefs	7	1	6	200	0	0	0	0	0	0	0
2016	Chiefs	10	7	3	563	0	0	0	0	0	0	0
Total		17	8	9	763	0	0	0	0	0	0	0
