= Codey Rei =

New Zealand rugby union player

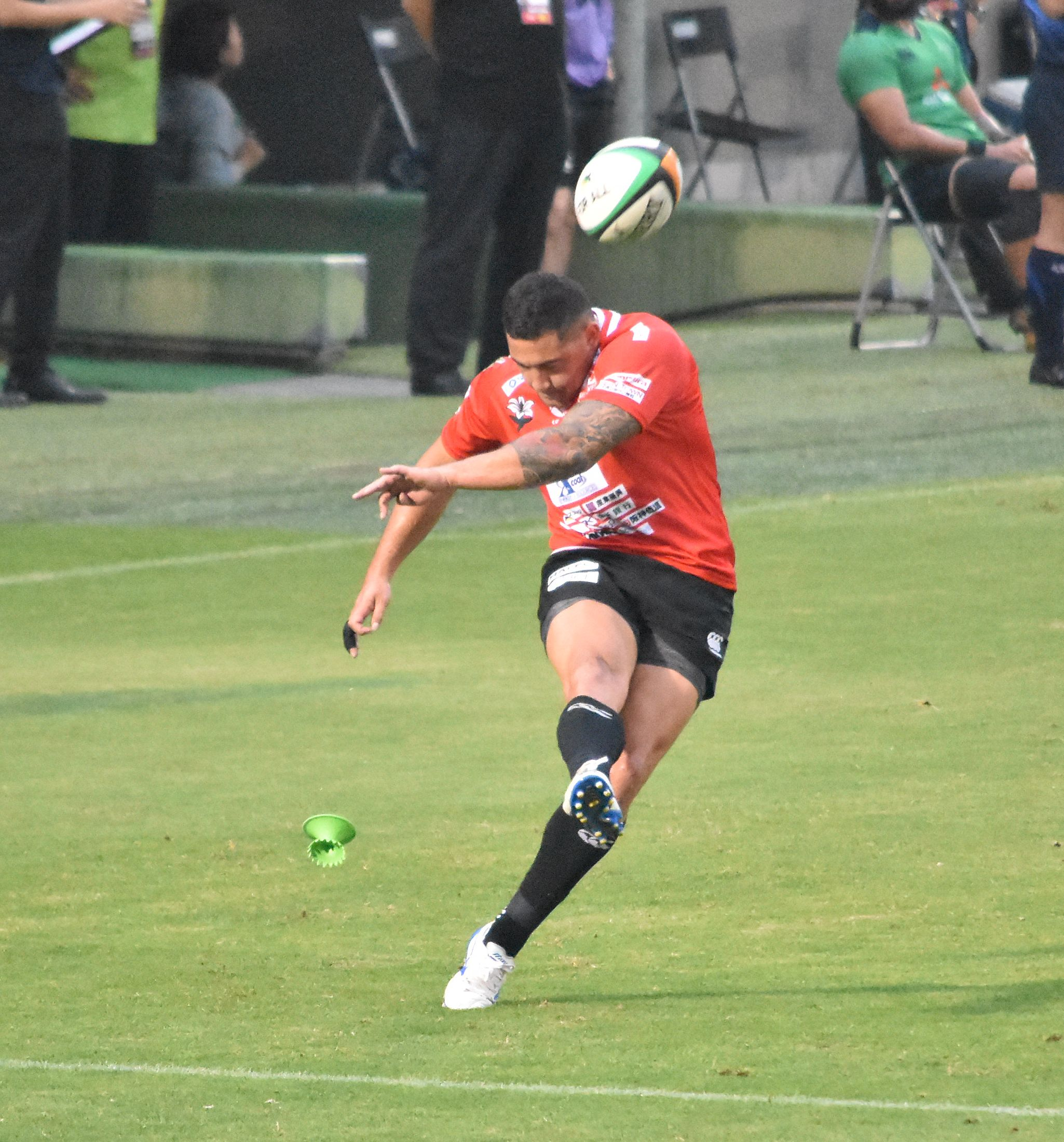
- Codey Rei
- Full name: Codey Spencer Rei
- Born: 2 February 1989 (age 37) Patea, New Zealand
- Height: 183 cm (6 ft 0 in)
- Weight: 94 kg (207 lb; 14 st 11 lb)
- School: New Plymouth Boys' High School

Rugby union career
- Position(s): Fullback, First five-eighth, Wing
- Current team: Kamaishi Seawaves
Senior career
Years	Team	Apps	(Points)
2010–2015	Taranaki	27	(173)
2011–2013	North Harbour	22	(70)
2016–2018	Kobelco Steelers	19	(191)
2018–	Kamaishi Seawaves	7	(20)
- Correct as of 28 June 2020
International career
Years	Team	Apps	(Points)
2009	New Zealand U20	3	(26)
2015	Māori All Blacks	1	(5)
- Correct as of 28 June 2020

Codey Spencer Rei (born 2 February 1989) is a New Zealand rugby union player. He plays in the wing, fly-half and fullback position and is considered a utility back.

In June 2016 it was announced Rei had signed for Kobe Kobelco Steelers on a two-year contract.

Rei has captained the Chiefs development side.

He has played for ITM Cup side Taranaki as well as for North Harbour.

Rei has also been capped for New Zealand's māori international side the Māori All Blacks.

== Personal ==
Rei and his partner have a son, Reggie.

Rei is a New Zealander of Māori descent (Ngā Ruahine and Te Ātiawa descent).
