= Chris Eaton (rugby union) =

New Zealand rugby union player (born 1984)

- Born: Christopher George Eaton; 29 March 1984 (age 42) Hastings, New Zealand
- Height: 175 cm (5 ft 9 in)
- Weight: 92 kg (14 st 7 lb)
- School: St John's College

Rugby union career
- Position: Scrum-half
Senior career
Years	Team	Apps	(Points)
2005–2017	Hawke's Bay	113	(45)
2011–2012	Hurricanes	27	(15)
2013	Western Force		
2017–2019	Valladolid	37	(75)
2019-	RC Kuban		

Christopher George Eaton (born 29 March 1984 in Hastings, New Zealand) is a rugby union footballer who plays as a scrum-half for the Western Force in Super Rugby and for Hawke's Bay Magpies in the ITM Cup. He previously played for the Wellington Hurricanes in the 2012 and 2013 seasons. He is now playing his trade in Krasnodar, Russia with RC Kuban.
