= Keepa Mewett =

New Zealand rugby union player

- Born: 10 May 1987 (age 39) New Zealand
- Height: 198 cm (6 ft 6 in)
- Weight: 113 kg (249 lb; 17 st 11 lb)

Rugby union career
- Position: Lock
Senior career
Years	Team	Apps	(Points)
2012–2017	Bay of Plenty	32	(5)
2014	Manawatu	11	(0)
2018–2020	NTT Red Hurricanes	20	(25)
2020	Bay of Plenty	9	(5)
- Correct as of 30 August 2021

Te Keepa Hone Mewett (born 10 May 1987 in New Zealand) is a New Zealand rugby union player who played for Bay of Plenty and Manawatu in the National Provincial Championship. His playing position is lock.
