= Mitchell Graham =

NZ rugby union player (born 1991)

- Full name: Mitchell Brown Graham
- Born: 30 January 1991 (age 35) Matamata, New Zealand
- Height: 1.87 m (6 ft 2 in)
- Weight: 122 kg (269 lb)
- School: St Peter's School
- University: University of Canterbury

Rugby union career
- Position: Prop
Senior career
Years	Team	Apps	(Points)
2013	Canterbury	1	(0)
2014−2017	Taranaki	44	(5)
2015−2016	Chiefs	26	(5)

Mitchell Brown Graham (born 30 January 1991) is a former New Zealand rugby union player who played as a prop for Taranaki in New Zealand's domestic Mitre 10 Cup and the Chiefs in the international Super Rugby competition.

== Early career ==
Born in the rural Waikato town of Matamata, Graham was educated at St Peter's School, Cambridge where he played first XV rugby. During his high school years, he represented Waikato at under-16 level before moving to Christchurch to study chemical engineering at the University of Canterbury. While in Christchurch, Graham represented Canterbury at under-18 and under-21 level. Graham graduated with a Bachelor of Engineering degree in 2014.

== Senior career ==
Graham made one appearance for Canterbury in 2013 while still studying at university before heading north to join the Taranaki Bulls after graduation.

The move to Taranaki immediately played off as he started all 12 of their games during the 2014 season which culminated in them lifting the ITM Cup Premiership title with a 36–32 victory over Tasman in the final. He was again an ever present in the number 1 jersey through 2015 with the Bulls this time faltering at the semi-final stage. He took his run of consecutive starts in a Taranaki jersey to 34 in 2016 with his side again reaching the competition's semi-finals before they went down to Tasman.

== Super Rugby ==
Graham's form in the loosehead prop position during Taranaki's 2014 title winning season brought him to the attention of Hamilton-based Super Rugby franchise, the Chiefs, who named him as a member of their squad for the 2015 Super Rugby season. Competing against Jamie Mackintosh and Pauliasi Manu for the number 1 jersey, Graham made an impressive 10 appearances during his debut season in Super Rugby. He remained a member of the squad through 2016 and with Manu missing the majority of the campaign through injury, Graham was able to establish himself as the Chiefs first-choice loosehead prop, playing 14 times and scoring 1 try. He was again named in the Chiefs squad for the 2017 Super Rugby season.

Playing for the Chiefs in the 2017 Brisbane Tens Graham fractured the tibia and fibula in his left leg, in a potentially career-ending injury.

== Career honours ==
Canterbury

- Mitre 10 Cup Premiership - 2013

Taranaki

- Mitre 10 Cup Premiership - 2014

== Statistics ==
=== Club ===
As of 2 April 2018

Season	Team	Games	Starts	Sub	Mins	Tries	Cons	Pens	Drops	Points	Yel	Red
ITM Cup / Mitre 10 Cup
2013	Canterbury	1	0	1	16	0	0	0	0	0	0	0
2014	Taranaki	12	12	0	778	0	0	0	0	0	0	0
2015	Taranaki	11	11	0	735	0	0	0	0	0	1	0
2016	Taranaki	11	11	0	788	0	0	0	0	0	0	0
2017	Taranaki	10	10	0	677	2	0	0	0	10	0	0
Super Rugby
2015	Chiefs	10	5	5	431	0	0	0	0	0	0	0
2016	Chiefs	14	10	4	737	1	0	0	0	5	1	0
Total		24	15	9	1168	1	0	0	0	5	1	0
