= Jackson Ormond =

New Zealand rugby union player (born 1990)

- Born: Jackson Tamati Ormond; 21 November 1990 (age 35) Hāwera, New Zealand
- Height: 1.83 m (6 ft 0 in)
- Weight: 95 kg (209 lb)
- School: Hawera High School; New Plymouth Boys' High School
- Notable relative: Lewis Ormond (brother)

Rugby union career
- Position(s): Centre, Wing
- Current team: Southland
Senior career
Years	Team	Apps	(Points)
2011–2017	Taranaki	57	(60)
2018–	Southland	6	(0)
- Correct as of 10 October 2018
National sevens team
Years	Team		Comps
2010–2011	New Zealand		3
- Correct as of 31 March 2011

Jackson Tamati Ormond (born 21 November 1990) is a New Zealand rugby union player. He plays in the wing (and occasionally centre) position for the provincial Mitre 10 Cup side, Taranaki. He has also represented New Zealand in sevens rugby since 2010.

== Domestic career ==
Aged only 20, Ormond made his provincial debut for Taranaki in 2011, playing in a 30–23 win over Waikato. He made a further eight appearances from the wing position and his performances' didn't go unnoticed by Super Rugby coaches. The following year he was signed by the Super Rugby side the Hurricanes as a member of the wider training group. In 2012 season's ITM Cup, Ormond continued to be a key contributor for Taranaki, playing the season's first two Ranfurly Shield matches against King Country and Wanganui. He was contracted and appeared in nine matches and recorded three tries. Ormond was also awarded 'Try of the Year' for the side.

In 2013 Ormond had been prominent at wing and dominated the position in form with Taranaki. His versatility and high standard of performance saw him play several positions, including centre and fullback. Ormond recorded nine appearances for the province.

== International career ==
Ormond was selected in the New Zealand Sevens team for the 2010 HSBC Sevens World Series in Dubai and George, making his international rugby debut at the Dubai Exiles Rugby Ground. He was then signed in Gordon Tietjens contracted squad for 2011. Ormond went on to join the squad in Australia for the Adelaide leg of the HSBC Sevens World Series. He had been called into the squad to replace Waikato's Rory Grice who fractured his right index finger during the Hong Kong tournament.

== Personal life ==
Ormond is the brother of Lewis Ormond, a rugby sevens Olympian.
