= Ihaia West =

NZ rugby union player

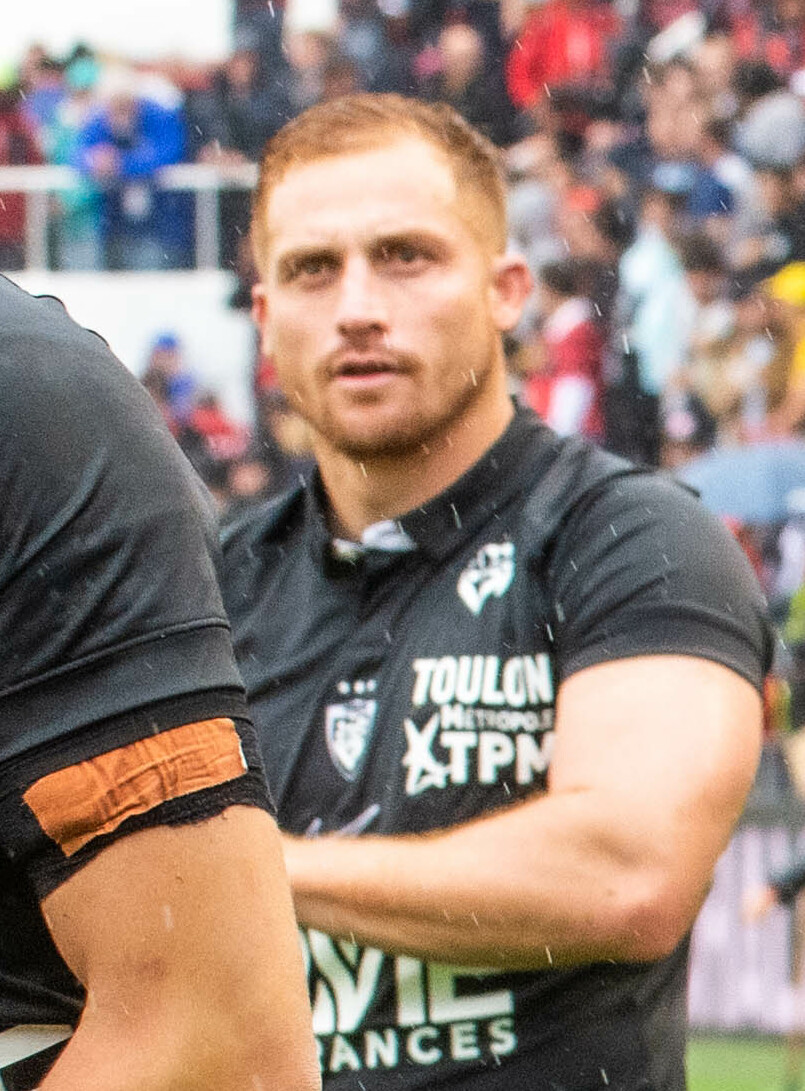
- West in a Challenge Cup match against Benetton in 2023
- Born: Ihaia Thomas West; 16 January 1992 (age 34) Havelock North, New Zealand
- Height: 1.75 m (5 ft 9 in)
- Weight: 84 kg (13 st 3 lb)
- School: Napier Boys' High School

Rugby union career
- Position: First five-eighth
- Current team: La Rochelle
Senior career
Years	Team	Apps	(Points)
2018–2022	La Rochelle	91	(861)
2022–2023	Toulon	28	(44)
2023–	La Rochelle	4	(5)
- Correct as of 2 November 2023
Provincial / State sides
Years	Team	Apps	(Points)
2012–2018	Hawke's Bay	62	(628)
- Correct as of 14 November 2022
Super Rugby
Years	Team	Apps	(Points)
2014–2017	Blues	45	(357)
2018	Hurricanes	14	(22)
- Correct as of 14 November 2022
International career
Years	Team	Apps	(Points)
2012	New Zealand U20	5	(40)
2013–2017	Maori All Blacks	10	(63)
2022	Barbarian F.C.	1	(2)
- Correct as of 14 November 2022

Ihaia West (born 16 January 1992) is a New Zealand rugby union player who currently plays for La Rochelle in the Top 14 in France. Prior to this he was with Hawke's Bay in the ITM Cup as well as playing for the Hurricanes in Super Rugby. West played at under-20 level for New Zealand.

== Career ==
West made his provincial debut for Hawke's Bay in 2012.

In 2013, he was named as the sole First Five-Eighth in the Maori All Blacks squad for their tour to North America.

At the start of 2014, West was called into the Chiefs squad as injury cover, but was never included in a matchday squad for the Hamilton-based side.

In April 2014, West was called into the Blues squad, as injury replacement for Baden Kerr who was ruled out for the remainder of the 2014 Super Rugby season.

On 2 May 2014 West had his debut Super Rugby match for the Blues against the Queensland Reds at Eden Park where he scored a try.

On 7 June 2017, West scored the match winning try against the touring British and Irish Lions at Eden Park, with 6 minutes remaining. He added the conversion to push his side to a 22–16 final scoreline in what was the first Lions defeat on tour.

On 4 April 2018, West moved to France as he signed for Top 14 side La Rochelle from the 2018–19 season. West won the 2021-2022 Heineken Champions Cup with La Rochelle as their primary First Five-Eighth, kicking 9 points for them in the final against the heavy favourites Leinster. On 5 December 2021, West signed for Top 14 rivals Toulon on a three-year deal ahead of the 2022–23 season.

== Honours ==
=== Club ===
(New Zealand) Hawke's Bay

- 2015 ITM Cup Championship Division

(France) La Rochelle

- European Rugby Champions Cup: 2021–2022

=== Individual ===
- Top 14 top points scorer: 2018–19 (257 points)
