= Charlie Ngatai =

New Zealand rugby union player

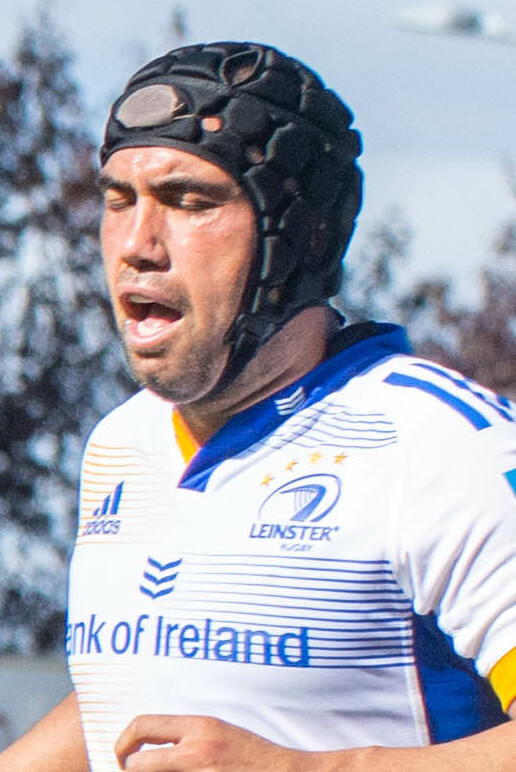
- Ngatai in 2022
- Born: Charlie James Ngatai; 17 August 1990 (age 36) Gisborne, New Zealand
- Height: 187 cm (6 ft 2 in)
- Weight: 102 kg (16 st 1 lb)
- School: Gisborne Boys' High School
- Occupation: Professional rugby player

Rugby union career
- Position(s): Centre, Fullback
- Current team: Leinster Rugby
Senior career
Years	Team	Apps	(Points)
2008	Poverty Bay	3	(20)
2009–2013	Wellington	39	(25)
2011–2012	Hurricanes	11	(20)
2013–2018	Chiefs	56	(97)
2014–2017	Taranaki	29	(73)
2018–2022	Lyon	86	(136)
2022–2024	Leinster	25	(15)
- Correct as of 18 May 2024
International career
Years	Team	Apps	(Points)
2010	New Zealand U20	5	(5)
2012–2017	Māori All Blacks	12	(20)
2015	New Zealand	1	(0)
- Correct as of 13 June 2022

Charlie James Ngatai (born 17 August 1990) is a New Zealand professional rugby union player who plays as a centre, although he can also cover other backline positions. Ngatai last played for Leinster Rugby in Ireland, having previously been Captain of the Chiefs, Taranaki Rugby Football Union and the Māori All Blacks internationally.

Ngatai made his debut for the All Blacks in 2015. He only played one test for New Zealand due to injury impacting his form.

== Early and personal life ==
Ngatai was born in Gisborne to Kirk and Lisa Ngatai. He is of Ngati Porou and Te Whanau-a-Apanui and Te Whakatohea iwi. Ngatai attended Gisborne Boys' High School where he captained the First XV rugby team.

In 2007 Ngatai attended the Sydney Youth Olympics as a sprinter where he competed in the 100m and 4 × 100 m relay. Ngatai has since become well known in rugby for his pace and ball-handling skills.

Ngatai is father to two girls.

== Professional career ==
In 2008, Ngatai made his first class provincial debut at age 18 for Poverty Bay against Wanganui. He made his ITM Cup debut the following year with Wellington Lions. Ngatai played for Wellington until 2013. Ngatai had a successful stint with Wellington and was signed to the Hurricanes during his time there, as well as making his debut for the Māori All Blacks in 2012.

In Super Rugby, Ngatai represented the Hurricanes from 2011, until shifting to the Chiefs as midfielder in 2013. The move to the Chiefs proved useful for his career, as he was handed the captaincy for the first time during the 2014 tour of Japan. In 2014 he also shifted to Taranaki to play for them in the Mitre 10 Cup. At the end of the 2014 season, Ngatai was a nominee for the Tom French Memorial Maori Player of the Year at the Steinlager Rugby Awards.

He also captained the Māori All Blacks against Fiji in Suva on 11 July 2015. Only three days prior, on 8 July 2015, Ngatai made his All Blacks debut when he replaced fellow debutant George Moala 66 minutes into a one-off test against Samoa in Apia. Ngatai was outstanding in the 2015 season, but was not selected for New Zealand when they named the All Black squad for the 2015 Rugby World Cup.

After performing well in Super Rugby player in 2016, Ngatai was re-selected for the All Blacks' 32-man squad to face Wales in the three-test Steinlager series. Ngatai unfortunately withdrew from the squad due to a failure to recover from concussion. Ngatai was replaced in the squad by Moala. Ngatai never made the field for New Zealand again, with his form crippled by injury.

After sustaining the head knock against the Highlanders in May 2016, Ngatai not only missed the Steinlager series, but also remainder of the 2016 season due to on-going concussion symptoms. During this time he contemplated retiring from rugby. however he returned to the professional game in May 2017.

Ngatai recovered from concussion in time to make the Māori All Blacks' squad to face the touring British and Irish Lions side in 2017 after spending almost a year out from professional rugby due to injury. Ngatai started for the Māori All Blacks against the Lions on 17 June 2017 at inside centre and lasted the full 80 minutes of their 10–32 loss to the Lions. Ngatai managed to re-gain his place as a regular starter for the Chiefs, starting at inside centre for them in the playoffs before they lost their semi-final to the Crusaders 13–27 on 29 July 2017.

Prior to the start of the 2018 Super Rugby season, Ngatai announced that he and his family would leave New Zealand for France so that Ngatai could further his playing career. It was confirmed that Ngatai had signed with Lyon OU, home to fellow former All Black Rudi Wulf. Ngatai spent his final season with the Chiefs as Co-Captain alongside flanker and former All Black teammate Sam Cane. Ngatai played in most games for the Chiefs in 2018, missing a few due to separate injuries. Ngatai played his final match for the Chiefs on 20 July, losing to the Hurricanes. The Chiefs scored a late consolation try in the 80th minute of the game, with Ngatai given the kicking duty. Ngatai converted the kick, making the score a 31–32 loss for the Chiefs.
