= Maama Vaipulu =

Tonga international rugby union player

- Full name: Maama 'oe Mo'ui Vaipulu
- Born: 21 July 1989 (age 37) Kawakawa, New Zealand
- Height: 1.90 m (6 ft 3 in)
- Weight: 112 kg (17 st 9 lb; 247 lb)
- School: Wesley College
- Notable relative: Lemeki Vaipulu (father)

Rugby union career
- Position: Number 8
- Current team: Castres
Senior career
Years	Team	Apps	(Points)
2012–2015	Counties Manukau	40	(55)
2015–2016	Chiefs	18	(0)
2016–	Castres	65	(45)
- Correct as of 11 September 2019
International career
Years	Team	Apps	(Points)
2017–	Tonga	8	(0)
- Correct as of 11 September 2019

Maama Vaipulu (born 21 July 1989) is a New Zealand rugby player of Tongan descent. He represented Counties Manukau and the Chiefs in New Zealand and Tonga on an international level. Currently he plays in the number 8 and occasionally flanker position for the France based Top 14 side, Castres.

== Career ==
Vaipulu started his professional career with the Counties Manukau Steelers during the 2012 ITM Cup, playing in the number eight position he immediately became a regular in the starting 15 and helped his side to become established in the ITM Cup Premiership. His physical play and explosiveness for the Steelers saw him named in the Chiefs squad for the 2015 Super Rugby season.

As of 2016 Vaipulu has been with Castres Olympique in France where they took out the French title in 2018 and representing Tonga's 'Ikale Tahi team in the 2019 Rugby World Cup in Japan where they finished 4th in their round after a win against USA.

== Honours ==
=== Club ===
(France) Castres

- Top 14: 2017–18
