= Bryce Heem =

New Zealand rugby union player

- Full name: Bryce Ian Heem
- Born: 18 January 1989 (age 37) Auckland, New Zealand
- Height: 193 cm (6 ft 4 in)
- Weight: 108 kg (17 st 0 lb; 238 lb)
- School: Avondale College

Rugby union career
- Positions: Centre; wing
Senior career
Years	Team	Apps	(Points)
2010	Auckland	3	(0)
2010–2011	Northland	15	(25)
2012–2014	Tasman	25	(15)
2015	Chiefs	16	(20)
2015	Auckland	10	(25)
2015–2019	Worcester Warriors	70	(160)
2019–2020	Toulon	26	(30)
2021–2024	Blues	41	(45)
2021–2024	Auckland	18	(10)
International career
Years	Team	Apps	(Points)
2010	NZ Barbarians	1	(0)
National sevens team
Years	Team		Comps
2011–2014	New Zealand		
Medal record
Men's rugby sevens
Representing New Zealand
Commonwealth Games
Silver medal – second place	2014 Glasgow	Team competition

Bryce Ian Heem (born 18 January 1989) is a former New Zealand rugby union player. He played as a wing or centre for the Blues in Super Rugby between 2021 and 2024, and was a member of the New Zealand national rugby sevens team from 2011 to 2014, winning a silver medal at the 2014 Commonwealth Games.

== Club career ==
Heem began his senior rugby career with his home province Auckland and made 3 appearances during the 2010 ITM Cup season before heading north to Whangārei to link up with Northland Taniwha as a loan player. He spent 2 seasons with the Cambridge Blues and scored 5 tries in 15 appearances before heading down to the South Island to join the Tasman Mako in 2012. He firmly established himself as a regular starter for the men from Nelson during their impressive 2013 and 2014 ITM Cup campaigns and this form saw him handed a Super Rugby contract with the Chiefs ahead of the 2015 Super Rugby season.

On 8 April 2015, it was announced Heem would move to England to join Worcester Warriors in the Aviva Premiership from the 2015–16 season. Heem marked his debut with a try in a victory over Newcastle Falcons in November 2015.

On the 18 November 2017, Heem scored a hat-trick of tries in Worcester's first win of the 2017-18 English Premiership season. The win against Northampton Saints (30–15) saw Worcester lifted from bottom of the table. A culmination of improved performances in two close losses against Harlequins, in the preceding weeks.

Heem went on to play four seasons for Worcester Warriors, scoring 32 tries in 70 games.

On 27 February 2019, French giants Toulon announced that they had signed Heem on a two-year deal, starting from the 2019–20 Top 14 season. However, on 25 January 2021, the club granted him an early release from his contract to return to New Zealand for family reasons. He played 26 games and scored 6 tries for Toulon.

He subsequently joined the Blues for the 2021 Super Rugby season. He came off the bench in the Blues 41–10 win over the Chiefs in the 2024 Super Rugby Pacific Grand Final. It was the franchise's 4th Super Rugby title, and their first since 2003.

Heem announced his retirement from rugby in May 2025, after a wrist injury in 2024 ruled him out of the 2025 Super Rugby season.

== International career ==
Heem represented the All Blacks Sevens side from 2011 until he signed his Super Rugby contract with the Chiefs. His time on the sevens circuit saw him win a silver medal at the 2014 Commonwealth Games in Glasgow.
