= Mitchell Crosswell =

NZ rugby union player

- Full name: Mitchell Colin Crosswell
- Born: 14 November 1988 (age 37) Feilding, New Zealand
- Height: 190 cm (6 ft 3 in)
- Weight: 106 kg (234 lb; 16 st 10 lb)
- School: Feilding High School
- Notable relative: Nick Crosswell (brother)

Rugby union career
- Position(s): Flanker, Number 8
- Current team: Taranaki
Senior career
Years	Team	Apps	(Points)
2008–2010	Manawatu	11	(5)
2013–	Taranaki	62	(30)
2015	Chiefs	3	(0)
2019	East Coast	8	(10)
- Correct as of 16 July 2021
International career
Years	Team	Apps	(Points)
2014–2015	Māori All Blacks	3	(0)
- Correct as of 16 July 2021

Mitchell Crosswell (born 14 November 1988 in Feilding, New Zealand) is a New Zealand rugby union player. He plays in the flanker (and occasionally number eight) position for the provincial based ITM Cup side Taranaki.

== Playing career ==
Crosswell made his provincial debut for Manawatu in 2008, he was a part of the Turbos squad up until 2011. He then went on to play a season for the Hino Red Dolphins in the Japanese competition. He then returned to New Zealand to play for provincial union, Taranaki, in the opening game of the 2013 ITM Cup.

== Personal life ==
Crosswell is a New Zealander of Māori descent (Ngāti Porou descent).
