= Pauliasi Manu =

Tongan rugby union player

- Born: Pauliasi Manu; 23 December 1987 (age 38) Neiafu, Tonga
- Height: 1.85 m (6 ft 1 in)
- Weight: 113 kg (249 lb)
- School: Tamaki College

Rugby union career
- Position: Loosehead Prop
Senior career
Years	Team	Apps	(Points)
2018–2020	Hino Red Dolphins	15	(0)
- Correct as of 26 July 2021
Provincial / State sides
Years	Team	Apps	(Points)
2008–14	Auckland	50	(25)
2014–	Counties Manukau	24	(10)
- Correct as of 23 October 2016
Super Rugby
Years	Team	Apps	(Points)
2011–12	Blues	5	(0)
2013–16	Chiefs	49	(5)
2017−18	Blues	28	(0)
2018-2019	Sunwolves	9	(0)
- Correct as of 26 July 2021

Pauliasi Manu (born 23 December 1987) is a New Zealand former rugby union player and current coach. Manu is a specialist prop. He played for the Blues in Super Rugby.

== Career ==
=== Early career ===
Manu debuted for Auckland in the 2008 season, and in doing so became Tamaki College's first Auckland representative. Since his debut, he has become a regular starter for the team.

=== Super Rugby ===
A member of the 2011 wider training group, Manu made his Blues debut in 2011, in a home match against the New South Wales Waratahs. He made two appearances for the side in 2011, and was a full member of the squad for the 2012 season. After making only three appearances in the 2012 season, he was delisted by new Blues coach Sir John Kirwan and signed a two-year deal with the Melbourne Rebels for the 2013 and 2014 seasons. However, after failing a pre-season medical examination, his contract for the 2013 season was terminated. The Hamilton-based Chiefs subsequently picked up Manu in early 2013 as a replacement prop for the injured Josh Hohneck. In 2013, he signed a contract extension with the Chiefs until 2016. Manu rejoined his former team, the Blues, in 2017. He scored the franchise's first try against the Rebels in an 18–56 victory in Melbourne

For the 2022 Super Rugby Season Pauliasi is an assistant coach of Moana Pasifika.
