= 2007 Super 14 season =

Men's rugby union club competition

2007 Super 14
- Countries: Australia; South Africa; New Zealand
- Tournament format(s): Round-robin and knockout
- Champions: (South Africa) Bulls (1st title)
- Matches played: 94
- Tries scored: 440 (4.68 per match)
- Top point scorer(s): Stephen Donald (164; Chiefs)
- Top try scorer(s): JP Pietersen (12; Sharks)

The 2007 Super 14 season started in February 2007 with preseason matches held from mid-January. It finished on 19 May with the final at Kings Park Stadium in Durban, in the first final between two South African teams in the history of Super Rugby. The visiting Bulls won the 2007 Super 14 Final, scoring a try in the 83rd minute and narrowly defeating the Sharks 20–19, thereby becoming the first South African side to win the Super Rugby title in the professional era.

Super 14 is a provincial rugby union competition with 14 teams from New Zealand, Australia and South Africa. This season is the second of the expansion, which led to the name change to the Super 14. The 2007 season saw an old team emerge with a new name, as the Cats changed their name to the Lions effective 8 September 2006.

There was also some confusion over the inclusion of the Southern Spears franchise, who were in the end not included. The season is also notable of the New Zealand sides resting several All Blacks players in the first half of the season. There were 94 matches held over the 3½ months, with each team playing one full round robin against the 13 other teams, 2 semi-finals and a final. Every team will get one bye over the 14 rounds.

== Player withdrawal ==
With the Rugby World Cup in September, all three countries would have some of their top players rested, to avoid injuries. All Blacks coach Graham Henry made clear his wish for up to 30 of New Zealand's best players to miss around half of the Super 14, with the five New Zealand franchises supporting him in May 2006. The mandatory stand-down period meant that the 30 players who toured at the end of 2006 would miss at least the first week of competition.

John Connolly, the Wallabies coach, was also interested in lightening the load for his top players. It was expected that the Australians would want to rest only a few players, especially veterans such as Stephen Larkham and George Gregan, as they are seen as key to Australia's World Cup chances. Springboks coach Jake White met the board of SA Rugby, the commercial arm of the South African Rugby Union, in Cape Town on 25 May 2006 to put forward his suggestion to rest key players between then and the World Cup at regular intervals. White was also keen to rest some players during the Boks' 2006 mid-year internationals against Scotland and France.

It was revealed in September 2006 that the All Blacks would rest 22 players, who would go into a "conditioning group" for the first 7 weeks of competition. The 22 players named were: Jerry Collins, Jason Eaton, Carl Hayman, Andrew Hore, Chris Jack, Richie McCaw, Chris Masoe, Keven Mealamu, Anton Oliver, Greg Somerville, Rodney So'oialo, Reuben Thorne, Ali Williams, Tony Woodcock, Dan Carter, Byron Kelleher, Leon MacDonald, Aaron Mauger, Mils Muliaina, Joe Rokocoko, Sitiveni Sivivatu and Piri Weepu. Seven of these players were from the Crusaders, six from the Hurricanes, four from the Blues, three from the Chiefs and two from the Highlanders. These players would be available for their franchises from Week 8. From these 22 players, Jason Eaton and Piri Weepu didn't make the final All Blacks squad for the 2007 Rugby World Cup.

After the NZRU announced the resting of 22 leading players, Pat Wilson, Australian High Performance Manager, revealed that leading Wallabies would only be rested for one match, which was to be chosen by their state's union. This decision has drawn criticism from former Wallabies coach and current Queensland Reds coach Eddie Jones, who said that while resting the older players could be beneficial, it is better for younger players, such as his own Rodney Blake, to receive game time.

The SARU decided against resting their top players for the 2007 Super 14 but conceded that it was likely that players would be rested for some games. It is expected that News Corp and the other SANZAR nations will request compensation from the New Zealand Rugby Union.

== Southern Spears saga ==
During the 2006 Super 14 season, SA Rugby announced that, contrary to the original plans, the Southern Spears would not replace the lowest ranked South African based side.

In August 2006, however, the Spears won a court case for inclusion into the 2007 season, which would be at the expense of the Cats, who changed their name to the Lions the following month. SA Rugby and the South African Rugby Union were expected to appeal the High Court of South Africa's decision. In November 2006, SA Rugby and the Spears reached a settlement. The financially troubled Spears abandoned the court case. They would no longer be a part of Super Rugby, but instead would remain as an organisation to promote and develop rugby in the Southern and Eastern Cape region, with the support of SA Rugby and the SARU. With the settlement, the season's Super 14 line-up was set, with the Lions taking up the final South African place.

== Table ==
Key to colours
Top four teams advance to playoffs.

	Team	Pld	W	D	L	PF	PA	PD	BP	Pts
1	(South Africa) Sharks	13	10	0	3	355	214	141	5	45
2	(South Africa) Bulls	13	9	0	4	388	223	165	6	42
3	(New Zealand) Crusaders	13	8	0	5	382	235	147	10	42
4	(New Zealand) Blues	13	9	0	4	355	235	120	6	42
5	(Australia) Brumbies	13	9	0	4	234	173	61	4	40
6	(New Zealand) Chiefs	13	7	1	5	373	321	52	10	40
7	(Australia) Western Force	13	6	1	6	276	292	−16	6	32
8	(New Zealand) Hurricanes	13	6	0	7	247	300	−53	3	27
9	(New Zealand) Highlanders	13	5	0	8	235	301	−66	7	27
10	(South Africa) Stormers	13	6	0	7	249	326	−77	3	27
11	(South Africa) Cheetahs	13	4	1	8	265	342	−77	4	22
12	(South Africa) Lions	13	5	0	8	175	284	−109	2	22
13	(Australia) Waratahs	13	3	1	9	266	317	−51	7	21
14	(Australia) Reds	13	2	0	11	201	438	−237	3	11

== Results ==
The draw for the 2007 season was released on 2006-10-13. The season started 8 days earlier than the 2006 season, with the first match being between the Blues and the Crusaders at Auckland's Eden Park, the second time in the last two years the Blues had hosted the first match. In total, 94 matches were played, comprising 91 regular season matches, 2 semi-finals and the final. There were 29 Friday night match-ups and 61 Saturday matches. One match, the Brumbies-Waratahs regional derby in Week 10, was played on a Sunday night.

=== Round 1 ===
The 2007 Super 14 started in contrast to that of 2006. The game of the week was the Blues from Auckland beating the defending champions the Crusaders, which was the first loss to a New Zealand side that the Crusaders had suffered since May 2004 and was ironically the Blues' first win over a New Zealand team for two years. The other upset was 2006 Finalists the Hurricanes losing to last years 12th placed Queensland Reds.

2 February 2007	Blues (New Zealand)	34–25	(New Zealand) Crusaders	Eden Park, Auckland
19:35	Tries: Isaia Toeava, Rudi Wulf, Doug Howlett; Con: Isa Nacewa (2); Pen: Isa Nacewa (5)		Tries: Corey Flynn, Mose Tuiali'i, Rico Gear; Con: Stephen Brett (2); Pen: Brent Ward (2)	Attendance: 26,300; Referee: Paul Honiss (New Zealand)

2 February 2007	Western Force (Australia)	7–8	(New Zealand) Highlanders	Subiaco Oval, Perth
19:05	Tries: James Hilgendorf; Con: Cameron Shepherd		Tries: Josh Blackie; Pen: Callum Bruce	Attendance: 30,704; Referee: Jerome Fortuin (South Africa)

2 February 2007	Lions (South Africa)	16–25	(Australia) Waratahs	Ellis Park Stadium, Johannesburg
19:10	Tries: Louis Ludik; Con: Louis Strydom; Pen: Louis Strydom (3)		Tries: Daniel Halangahu, Rocky Elsom, Adam Freier; Con: Peter Hewat (2); Pen: Peter Hewat (2)	Attendance: 15,000; Referee: Chris Pollock (New Zealand)

3 February 2007	Chiefs (New Zealand)	15–21	(Australia) Brumbies	Waikato Stadium, Hamilton
19:35	Tries: Sosene Anesi (2), Lelia Masaga		Tries: Clyde Rathbone, Stirling Mortlock; Con: Stirling Mortlock; Pen: Julian Huxley (2), Stirling Mortlock	Attendance: ~12,500; Referee: Mark Lawrence (South Africa)

3 February 2007	Reds (Australia)	25–16	(New Zealand) Hurricanes	Lang Park, Brisbane
19:40	Tries: Mitchell Chapman; Con: Clinton Schifcofske; Pen: Clinton Schifcofske (5); Drop: Berrick Barnes		Tries: Cory Jane; Con: Jimmy Gopperth; Pen: Jimmy Gopperth (3)	Attendance: 22,654; Referee: Jonathan Kaplan (South Africa)

3 February 2007	Sharks (South Africa)	17–3	(South Africa) Bulls	Kings Park Stadium, Durban
17:00	Tries: JP Pietersen (2); Con: Percy Montgomery (2); Pen: Percy Montgomery		Pen: Morné Steyn	Attendance: 33,572; Referee: Lyndon Bray (New Zealand)

3 February 2007	Cheetahs (South Africa)	27–9	(South Africa) Stormers	Vodacom Park, Bloemfontein
19:10	Tries: Adriaan Strauss, CJ van der Linde, Kabamba Floors; Pen: Meyer Bosman (4)		Pen: Naas Olivier (3)	Attendance: ~35,000; Referee: Craig Joubert

=== Round 2 ===
Week two saw the New Zealand teams have a strong week with the Hurricanes, Crusaders, Blues notching wins. Western Force began to show vast improvement from 2006 winning only their second match since entering the competition in 2006. Apart from the Force all other Australian teams suffered a loss.

9 February 2007	Chiefs (New Zealand)	32–39	(New Zealand) Hurricanes	Waikato Stadium, Hamilton
19:35	Tries: Roy Kinikinilau, Tom Willis, Brendon Leonard, Liam Messam; Con: Stephen Donald (3); Pen: Stephen Donald (2)		Tries: Alby Mathewson, Serge Lilo, Ma'a Nonu, Tana Umaga, Paul Tito; Con: Jimmy Gopperth (4); Pen: Jimmy Gopperth (2)	Attendance: 17,000 (approx); Referee: Bryce Lawrence (New Zealand)

9 February 2007	Stormers (South Africa)	3–22	(Australia) Western Force	Newlands Stadium, Cape Town
18:00	Pen: Naas Olivier		Tries: Ryan Cross; Con: Cameron Shepherd; Pen: Cameron Shepherd (5)	Referee: Lyndon Bray (New Zealand)

9 February 2007	Sharks (South Africa)	22–9	(Australia) Waratahs	Kings Park Stadium, Durban
20:05	Tries: Butch James; Con: Percy Montgomery; Pen: Percy Montgomery (4); Drop: François Steyn		Pen: Peter Hewat (3)	Attendance: 28,669; Referee: Chris Pollock (New Zealand)

10 February 2007	Crusaders (New Zealand)	33–22	(Australia) Reds	Lancaster Park, Christchurch
19:35	Tries: Ross Filipo, Mose Tuiali'i, Scott Hamilton, Brent Ward, Stephen Brett; Con: Stephen Brett (4)		Tries: Greg Holmes, Peter Hynes; Pen: Clinton Schifcofske (4)	Attendance: ~19,000; Referee: Mark Lawrence (South Africa)

10 February 2007	Brumbies (Australia)	15–17	(New Zealand) Blues	Canberra Stadium, Canberra
19:40	Pen: Julian Huxley (5)		Tries: Isa Nacewa, Saimone Taumoepeau; Con: Isa Nacewa (2); Pen: Isa Nacewa	Attendance: 16,127; Referee: Jonathan Kaplan (South Africa)

10 February 2007	Bulls (South Africa)	24–20	(South Africa) Cheetahs	Loftus Versfeld Stadium, Pretoria
17:00	Tries: Wessel Roux, Bryan Habana, Adriaan Fondse; Con: Morné Steyn (3); Pen: Morné Steyn		Tries: CJ Van Der Linde, Eddie Fredericks; Con: Meyer Bosman (2); Pen: Meyer Bosman (2)	Attendance: 51,762; Referee: Jerome Fortuin (South Africa)

10 February 2007	Lions (South Africa)	11–6	(New Zealand) Highlanders	Ellis Park Stadium, Johannesburg
19:00	Tries: Wylie Human; Pen: Louis Strydom (2)		Pen: Callum Bruce, Charlie Hore	Referee: Paul Marks (Australia)

=== Round 3 ===
In week three a Super rugby record was broken, although not one to be proud of. The Reds and Brumbies played in the lowest scoring match ever, a dire affair that resulted in a Brumbies win 6–3. The 22 All Blacks missing from New Zealand teams started to have a visible effect on the kiwi sides with only the Hurricanes claiming a tight win over the Blues. Another relatively low scoring match saw even the last years powerhouse champions the Crusaders beaten by last years 13th placed Lions, it was the first match in six years the Crusaders hadn't scored a single try.

16 February 2007	Stormers (South Africa)	21–16	(New Zealand) Chiefs	Newlands Stadium, Cape Town
18:10	Tries: Breyton Paulse, Jean de Villiers; Con: Peter Grant; Pen: Peter Grant (3)		Tries: Dwayne Sweeney; Con: Stephen Donald; Pen: Stephen Donald (3)	Referee: Paul Marks (Australia)

16 February 2007	Bulls (South Africa)	27–30	(Australia) Western Force	Loftus Versfeld Stadium, Pretoria
20:35	Tries: JP Nel (2), Anton Leonard; Con: Morné Steyn (3); Pen: Morné Steyn (2)		Tries: Cameron Shepherd (2), Gareth Hardy; Con: Cameron Shepherd (3); Pen: Cameron Shepherd (3)	Referee: Chris Pollock (New Zealand)

17 February 2007	Hurricanes (New Zealand)	23–22	(New Zealand) Blues	Wellington Regional Stadium, Wellington
19:35	Tries: Cory Jane, Serge Lilo; Con: Jimmy Gopperth (2); Pen: Jimmy Gopperth (3)		Tries: Doug Howlett, Anthony Tuitavake, Greg Rawlinson; Con: Isa Nacewa(2); Pen: Isa Nacewa	Attendance: 24,208; Referee: Jonathan Kaplan (South Africa)

17 February 2007	Reds (Australia)	3 – 6 *	(Australia) Brumbies	Lang Park, Brisbane
19:05	Pen: Clinton Schifcofske		Pen: Stirling Mortlock, Julian Huxley	Attendance: 25,170; Referee: Matt Goddard (Australia)

17 February 2007	Cheetahs (South Africa)	30–26	(Australia) Waratahs	ABSA Park, Kimberley
16:30	Tries: Ronnie Cooke, Phillip Burger, Eddie Fredericks, Juan Smith; Con: Meyer Bosman (2); Pen: Meyer Bosman; Drop: Herkie Kruger		Tries: Kurtley Beale, Ben Jacobs; Con: Peter Hewat (2); Pen: Peter Hewat(4)	Referee: Lyndon Bray (New Zealand)

17 February 2007	Lions (South Africa)	9–3	(New Zealand) Crusaders	Ellis Park Stadium, Johannesburg
18:30	Pen: Louis Strydom (3)		Pen: Stephen Brett	Referee: Brett Bowden (Australia)

17 February 2007	Sharks (South Africa)	23–16	(New Zealand) Highlanders	Kings Park Stadium, Durban
20:30	Tries: Percy Montgomery (2); Con: Percy Montgomery (2); Pen: Percy Montgomery (3)		Tries: Jason Kawau; Con: Charlie Hore; Pen: Charlie Hore (3)	Attendance: 28,023; Referee: James Leckie (Australia)

* Note: This match was the lowest-scoring in Super Rugby history at the time.

=== Round 4 ===
Week Four saw the Brumbies lose their second game by conceding a try in the final seconds to the Hurricanes (the first was to the Blues in Week Two). The Blues convincingly put away the Queensland Reds while the Force surrendered in the final seconds to the Lions leaving them yet to win a home game. The Bulls beat the Chiefs while the Crusaders began the show the form that they have displayed in past years by beating the Cheetahs 49–28.

23 February 2007	Hurricanes (New Zealand)	11–10	(Australia) Brumbies	Wellington Regional Stadium, Wellington
19:35	Tries: Thomas Waldrom; Pen: Jimmy Gopperth (2)		Tries: Adam Wallace-Harrison; Con: Julian Huxley; Pen: Julian Huxley	Attendance: 21,194; Referee: Craig Joubert (South Africa)

24 February 2007	Highlanders (New Zealand)	35–24	(South Africa) Stormers	Carisbrook, Dunedin
17:50	Tries: Matt Saunders (2), Viliame Waqaseduadua, Hale T-Pole; Cons: Charlie Hore (3); Pens: Charlie Hore (3)		Tries: Andries Bekker, Breyton Paulse, François van der Merwe, Luke Watson; Cons: Peter Grant (2)	Referee: Matt Goddard (Australia)

24 February 2007	Blues (New Zealand)	38–13	(Australia) Reds	Eden Park, Auckland
19:35	Tries: Rudi Wulf (2), Isa Nacewa, Jerome Kaino; Con: Isa Nacewa, Luke McAlister; Pen: Isa Nacewa, Luke McAlister (3)		Tries: Charlie Fetoai; Con: Clinton Schifcofske; Pen: Clinton Schifcofske (2)	Attendance: 30,000; Referee: Willie Roos (South Africa)

24 February 2007	Western Force (Australia)	24–25	(South Africa) Lions	Subiaco Oval, Perth
19:05	Tries: Cameron Shepherd, Gareth Hardy; Con: Cameron Shepherd; Pen: Cameron Shepherd (4)		Tries: Jaque Fourie; Con: Louis Strydom; Pen: Louis Strydom (4), André Pretorius; Drop: André Pretorius	Attendance: 25,000; Referee: Bryce Lawrence (New Zealand)

24 February 2007	Bulls (South Africa)	30–27	(New Zealand) Chiefs	Loftus Versfeld Stadium, Pretoria
17:00	Tries: Bakkies Botha, Gurthro Steenkamp, Bryan Habana; Pens: Morné Steyn (3), Derick Hougaard (2)		Tries: Lelia Masaga (2), Dwayne Sweeney; Con: Stephen Donald (3); Pen: Stephen Donald (2)	Referee: Brett Bowden (Australia)

24 February 2007	Cheetahs (South Africa)	28–49	(New Zealand) Crusaders	Vodacom Park, Bloemfontein
19:10	Tries: Darren Nell (2), Herkie Kruger; Con: Meyer Bosman (2); Pen: Meyer Bosman (2); Drop: Herkie Kruger		Tries: Casey Laulala, Caleb Ralph (2), Scott Hamilton (2), Stephen Brett; Con: Stephen Brett (5); Pen: Stephen Brett (3)	Referee: James Leckie (Australia)

=== Round 5 ===
Week 5 saw the Blues defeat the Highlanders, the Chiefs drew with the Cheetahs in the final moments of the game, the Hurricanes lost at | home to bottom placed Stormers and the Crusaders suffered their 3rd defeat of the season losing in the final minute because of a blunder by Rico Gear. The Brumbies also suffered a loss at | home to the Bulls whereas the controversial game of the round saw the Waratahs draw with the Western Force because of a blunder by Waratahs utility back Sam Norton-Knight who decide to run with the ball in the final minute instead of taking the penalty shot which could have won them the game and for his mistake Lote Tuqiri shoved him and walked off the pitch looking very disappointed.

2 March 2007	Blues (New Zealand)	28–9	(New Zealand) Highlanders	Eden Park, Auckland
19:35	Tries: Isaia Toeava (2), Troy Flavell; Pen: Luke McAlister (3); Con: Luke McAlister (2)		Pen: Nick Evans (3)	Attendance: 22,500; Referee: Steve Walsh (New Zealand)

2 March 2007	Waratahs (Australia)	16–16	(Australia) Western Force	Sydney Football Stadium, Sydney
19:40	Tries: Morgan Turinui; Con: Peter Hewat; Pen: Peter Hewat (3)		Tries Matt Giteau, Drew Mitchell; Pen: Cameron Shepherd (2)	Attendance: 31,149; Referee: Paul Marks (New Zealand)

2 March 2007	Cheetahs (South Africa)	22–22	(New Zealand) Chiefs	Free State Stadium, Bloemfontein
19:10	Tries: Tiger Mangweni; Con: Willem de Waal; Pen: Willem de Waal (5)		Tries: Lelia Masaga; Con: Stephen Donald; Pen: Stephen Donald (5)	Attendance: 20,500; Referee: James Leckie (Australia)

3 March 2007	Hurricanes (New Zealand)	17–30	(South Africa) Stormers	FMG Stadium, Palmerston North
19:05	Tries: David Smith, Cory Jane; Con: Jimmy Gopperth, Blair Stewart; Pen: Jimmy Gopperth		Tries: Jean de Villiers, Justin Melck, Corne Uys, Breyton Paulse; Con: Peter Grant (2); Pen: Peter Grant (2)	Attendance: 16,000; Referee: Matt Goddard (Australia)

3 March 2007	Brumbies (Australia)	7–19	(South Africa) Bulls	Canberra Stadium, Canberra
19:10	Tries: Gene Fairbanks; Con: Julian Huxley		Tries: Pedrie Wannenburg; Con: Derick Hougaard; Pen: Derick Hougaard (3); Drop: Derick Hougaard	Attendance: 15,101; Referee: Lyndon Bray (New Zealand)

3 March 2007	Reds (Australia)	20–26	(South Africa) Lions	Lang Park, Brisbane
20:10	Tries: Quade Cooper, Will Genia; Con: Clinton Schifcofske (2); Pen: Clinton Schifcofske (2)		Tries: Jaque Fourie, Ernst Joubert; Con: Earl Rose (2); Pen: Earl Rose (4)	Attendance: 17,011; Referee: Kelvin Deaker (New Zealand)

3 March 2007	Sharks (South Africa)	27–26	(New Zealand) Crusaders	ABSA Stadium, Durban
17:00	Tries: Albert van den Berg, Bismarck du Plessis, Odwa Ndungane; Con: Percy Montgomery (2), Ruan Pienaar; Pen: Percy Montgomery (2)		Tries: Kieran Read, Mose Tuiali'i; Con: Stephen Brett (2); Pen: Stephen Brett (3); Drop: Stephen Brett	Attendance: 33,470; Referee: (Australia) Stuart Dickinson

=== Round 6 ===
Week 6 saw the Reds travel to the "House of Pain" to play the Highlanders. Recent signing Andrew Walker was rushed into the starting team, however the Reds lost 17–33. The next game saw the Brumbies looking to rectify a three-game losing streak at their home ground. They did so with a convincing 26–13 win against the Stormers. The Force were also looking to end a | home ground hoodoo against the Hurricanes. Seeking their first ever victory at Subiaco the Force looked to have squandered an 11–10 lead upon conceding a try with two minutes left to put the score at 17–11. However a try on the sideline and followed by an unlikely conversion by Force wing Cameron Shepherd gave the Force a maiden | home victory. The next day opened with the Blues thrashing an in-form Lions outfit 41–14. The game saw Doug Howlett score two tries and in doing so becoming the equal highest try scorer in Super Rugby history (with Joe Roff of the Brumbies). The Waratahs then played a | home game against the Bulls – who won 32–19 thanks to two tries apiece to Bryan Habana and Fourie du Preez.

9 March 2007	Highlanders (New Zealand)	33–17	(Australia) Reds	Carisbrook, Dunedin
19:35	Tries: Aaron Bancroft, Lucky Mulipola, Glen Horton, Jason MacDonald; Con: Nick Evans (2); Pen: Nick Evans (2); Drop: Aaron Bancroft		Tries: Berrick Barnes, John Roe; Con: Quade Cooper, Berrick Barnes; Pen: Berrick Barnes	Attendance: 12,000; Referee: Marius Jonker (South Africa)

9 March 2007	Brumbies (Australia)	26–13	(South Africa) Stormers	Canberra Stadium, Canberra
19:40	Tries: Mark Chisholm, Stirling Mortlock, Adam Ashley-Cooper; Con: Stirling Mortlock; Pen: Stirling Mortlock (3)		Tries: Gio Aplon; Con: Peter Grant; Pen: Peter Grant (2)	Attendance: 14, 410; Referee: Steve Walsh (New Zealand)

9 March 2007	Western Force (Australia)	18–17	(New Zealand) Hurricanes	Subiaco Oval, Perth
19:05	Tries: Drew Mitchell, Cameron Shepherd; Con: Cameron Shepherd; Pen: Cameron Shepherd (2)		Tries: Tana Umaga, Jimmy Gopperth; Con: Blair Stewart, Jimmy Gopperth; Pen: Blair Stewart	Attendance: 30,704; Referee: Mark Lawrence (South Africa)

10 March 2007	Blues (New Zealand)	41–14	(South Africa) Lions	Eden Park, Auckland
19:35	Tries: Doug Howlett (2)*, Ben Atiga, Rudi Wulf, Daniel Braid, David Holwell; Con: David Holwell (4); Pen: David Holwell		Tries: Louie Ludik, Ethienne Reynecke; Con: André Pretorius, Earl Rose	Attendance: 22,000; Referee: Paul Marks (Australia)

9 March 2007	Waratahs (Australia)	19–32	(South Africa) Bulls	Sydney Football Stadium, Sydney
19:40	Tries: Kurtley Beale; Con: Peter Hewat; Pen: Peter Hewat (4)		Tries: Bryan Habana(2), Fourie du Preez(2); Con: Derick Hougaard(3); Pen: Derick Hougaard (2)	Attendance: 21,854; Referee: Kelvin Deaker (New Zealand)

9 March 2007	Cheetahs (South Africa)	14–30	(South Africa) Sharks	Vodacom Park, Bloemfontein
17:00	Tries: Juan Smith, Herkie Kruger; Con: Willem de Waal (2)		Tries: JP Pietersen, Jacques Botes, Waylon Murray; Con: Ruan Pienaar (3); Pen: Ruan Pienaar (3)	Attendance: 29,500; Referee: JC Fortuin (South Africa)

- Note: Doug Howlett became the joint top try scorer in Super Rugby with Joe Roff on 57 Tries

=== Round 7 ===
The Chiefs put on a convincing win against the Lions to start week seven. This was followed later that evening with the Force easily putting away the bottom of the table Reds in Perth. The Crusaders began to show their regular form with a win against the Bulls and the Waratahs season slumped to a new low with a home loss at the hands of the Stormers. The Cheetahs pulled off an unexpected win against the Brumbies and the undefeated Sharks continued their streak – beating the Hurricanes.

16 March 2007	Chiefs (New Zealand)	34–7	(South Africa) Lions	Waikato Stadium, Hamilton
19:35	Tries: Stephen Donald (2), Marty Holah, Liam Messam, Tane Tuipulotu; Con: Stephen Donald, Tasesa Lavea (2); Pen: Stephen Donald		Tries: André Pretorius; Con: André Pretorius	Attendance: 12,000; Referee: James Leckie (Australia)

16 March 2007	Western Force (Australia)	38–3	(Australia) Reds	Subiaco Oval, Perth
19:05	Tries: Chris O'Young, Penalty try, Cameron Shepherd, Digby Ioane; Con: Cameron Shepherd (3); Pen: Cameron Shepherd (4)		Pen: Andrew Walker	Attendance: 26,023; Referee: Brett Bowden (Australia)

17 March 2007	Crusaders (New Zealand)	32–10	(South Africa) Bulls	Lancaster Park, Christchurch
19:35	Tries: Johnny Leo'o, Rico Gear, Tim Bateman, Scott Hamilton; Con: Stephen Brett (3); Pen: Stephen Brett (2)		Tries: Wikus van Heerden; Con: Derick Hougaard; Pen: Derick Hougaard	Attendance: 18,240; Referee: Stuart Dickinson (Australia)

17 March 2007	Waratahs (Australia)	10–16	(South Africa) Stormers	Sydney Football Stadium, Sydney
19:40	Tries: Penalty try Con: Peter Hewat; Pen: Peter Hewat		Tries: Luke Watson; Con: Peter Grant; Pen: Peter Grant (3)	Attendance: 18,409; Referee: Lyndon Bray (New Zealand)

17 March 2007	Cheetahs (South Africa)	38–20	(Australia) Brumbies	Vodacom Park, Bloemfontein
17:00	Tries: Falie Oelschig, Gavin Passens, Richardt Strauss, Phillip Burger, Juan Smith; Con: Willem de Waal (5); Drop: Willem de Waal		Tries: Adam Ashley-Cooper, Mark Chisholm, Patrick Phibbs; Con: Julian Huxley; Pen: Julian Huxley	Attendance: 3,500; Referee: Paul Honiss (New Zealand)

17 March 2007	Sharks (South Africa)	27–14	(New Zealand) Hurricanes	Kings Park Stadium, Durban
19:10	Tries: JP Pietersen, Johan Ackermann, Jacques Botes, Warren Britz; Con: Butch James (2); Pen: Butch James (1)		Tries: Anthony Perenise; Pen: Blair Stewart (3)	Attendance: 36,700; Referee: Matt Goddard (Australia)

=== Round 8 ===
The Waratahs fell to another loss – being convincingly beaten by the Blues in Auckland. The Bulls were not worried about the "House of Pain" moniker of Carisbrook – instead they turned in on the Highlanders to win 22–13. The Crusaders continued their quick ascent up the ladder with a bonus-point win over the Stormers. Queensland slipped to another loss – albeit a close one – against the Chiefs. The Sharks suffered their first loss of the season as the Brumbies recording a big upset at ABSA Stadium. It was also the Brumbies first ever away win against the Sharks. The Lions continued the Hurricanes bad season with an easy win.

23 March 2007	Blues (New Zealand)	34–6	(Australia) Waratahs	Eden Park, Auckland
19:35	Tries: Daniel Braid, Troy Flavell (2), Steve Devine; Cons: Luke McAlister (4); Pens: Luke McAlister (2)		Pens: Peter Hewat (2)	Attendance: 27,500; Referee: Marius Jonker (South Africa)

24 March 2007	Highlanders (New Zealand)	13–22	(South Africa) Bulls	Carisbrook, Dunedin
17:30	Try: Jimmy Cowan; Con: Nick Evans; Pens: Nick Evans (2)		Try: Jaco van der Westhuyzen; Con: Derick Hougaard; Pens: Derick Hougaard (5)	Referee: Stuart Dickinson (Australia)

24 March 2007	Crusaders (New Zealand)	36–11	(South Africa) Stormers	Lancaster Park, Christchurch
19:35	Tries: Casey Laulala, Rico Gear (2), Leon MacDonald; Con: Dan Carter (2); Pen: Dan Carter (4)		Tries: De Wet Barry; Pen: Peter Grant (2)	Referee: (Australia) Brett Bowden

24 March 2007	Reds (Australia)	19–21	(New Zealand) Chiefs	Lang Park, Brisbane
19:40	Tries: David Croft; Con: Andrew Walker; Pen: Andrew Walker (4)		Tries: Kristian Ormsby (2); Con: Stephen Donald; Pen: Stephen Donald (3)	Attendance: 16,830; Referee: Willie Roos (South Africa)

24 March 2007	Sharks (South Africa)	10–21	(Australia) Brumbies	Kings Park Stadium, Durban
17:00	Tries: Adrian Jacobs; Con: Butch James; Pen: Ruan Pienaar		Tries: Julian Huxley, Adam Wallace-Harrison; Con: Julian Huxley; Pen: Julian Huxley (3)	Attendance: 38,787; Referee: Bryce Lawrence (New Zealand)

24 March 2007	Lions (South Africa)	30–7	(New Zealand) Hurricanes	Ellis Park Stadium, Johannesburg
19:10	Tries: Ethienne Reynecke, Jaque Fourie; Con: André Pretorius; Pen: André Pretorius (5); Drop: André Pretorius		Tries: Piri Weepu; Con: Blair Stewart	Referee: Matt Goddard (Australia)

=== Round 9 ===
The Highlanders recorded a home win over the Cheetahs to open the round before the Force subjected the Sharks to their second loss in as many matches in Perth. The Hurricanes pulled off a win over the Bulls and the Blues put in a hard-fought win over the Chiefs. The Blues' Doug Howlett took sole possession of the all-| time try scoring lead in Super Rugby during the latter match. The Crusaders pulled away from the Waratahs early in the game before slacking off in the second half and seeing their lead evaporate to 34–28. The Waratahs scored a try late in the game to seemingly secure a win with the kick to come – but Peter Hewat missed a relatively easy kick to hand the Crusaders a 34–33 win. The Brumbies won a second game in South Africa – this time a close encounter against the Lions. A late Julian Huxley try securing a 14–9 win for the Canberra-based side.

30 March 2007	Highlanders (New Zealand)	21–17	(South Africa) Cheetahs	Rugby Park, Invercargill
19:35	Tries: Kane Thompson, Lucky Mulipola; Con: Charlie Hore; Pen: Nick Evans(2), Charlie Hore		Tries: Eddie Fredericks, Kabamba Floors; Con: Willem de Waal, Meyer Bosman; Pen: Willem de Waal	Referee: Stuart Dickinson (Australia)

30 March 2007	Western Force (Australia)	22–12	(South Africa) Sharks	Subiaco Oval, Perth
19:05	Tries: Cameron Shepherd; Pen: Matt Giteau (5); Con: Matt Giteau		Pen: Ruan Pienaar (3); Drop: François Steyn	Referee: Lyndon Bray (New Zealand)

31 March 2007	Hurricanes (New Zealand)	17–9	(South Africa) Bulls	Wellington Regional Stadium, Wellington
17:30	Tries: Hosea Gear; Pen: Piri Weepu (4)		Pen: Derick Hougaard (3)	Attendance: 20,874; Referee: Brett Bowden (Australia)

31 March 2007	Chiefs (New Zealand)	11–18	(New Zealand) Blues	Waikato Stadium, Hamilton
19:35	Try: Tasesa Lavea; Pen: Stephen Donald (2)		Tries: Jerome Kaino, Keven Mealamu, Doug Howlett; Pen: Isa Nacewa	Referee: Steve Walsh (New Zealand)

31 March 2007	Waratahs (Australia)	33–34	(New Zealand) Crusaders	Sydney Football Stadium, Sydney
19:40	Tries: Lachlan Turner, Sam Harris, Sam Norton-Knight, Tatafu Polota-Nau; Con: Peter Hewat (2); Pen: Peter Hewat (3)		Tries: Campbell Johnstone, Rico Gear (2), Mose Tuiali'i, Aaron Mauger, Casey Laulala; Con: Stephen Brett (2)	Referee: Craig Joubert (South Africa)

31 March 2007	Lions (South Africa)	9–14	(Australia) Brumbies	Ellis Park Stadium, Johannesburg
17:00	Pen: André Pretorius (3)		Try: Julian Huxley; Pen: Julian Huxley (2); Drop: Julian Huxley	Referee: Paul Honiss (New Zealand)

=== Round 10 ===
The Blues easily put away the Cheetahs in the sole Good Friday game. The next day saw the Chiefs beat the Highlanders before a startling mountain backdrop in Queenstown. The Crusaders annihilated the Force 53–0. It was the largest score ever conceded by the Force and the largest losing margin – but for the Crusaders it didn't come close to their 96–19 win against the Waratahs in 2002. The Sharks continued the high scoring – putting 57 points on the Reds in Brisbane for a big win. The Stormers upset the Lions 30–8 in Cape Town. In the sole Easter Sunday clash the Waratahs failed to resurrect their season against the Brumbies – going down 36–10 in the interstate grudge match between the rivals. The win put the Brumbies into the top four for the first time in 2007.

6 April 2007	Blues (New Zealand)	26–8	(South Africa) Cheetahs	Eden Park, Auckland
19:35	Tries: Steve Devine, Doug Howlett, Anthony Tuitavake; Con: Isa Nacewa; Pen: Isa Nacewa (3)		Try: Ryno van der Merwe; Pen: Herkie Kruger	Referee: Paul Marks (Australia)

7 April 2007	Highlanders (New Zealand)	34–38	(New Zealand) Chiefs	Queenstown Events Centre, Queenstown
14:35	Tries: Lucky Mulipola, Anton Oliver, Viliame Waqaseduadua, Matt Saunders, Toby Morland; Con: Nick Evans (2), Charlie Hore; Pen: Nick Evans		Tries: Niva Ta'auso, Sitiveni Sivivatu (2), Lelia Masaga (2); Con: Stephen Donald (5); Pen: Stephen Donald	Attendance: 11,000; Referee: Steve Walsh (New Zealand)

7 April 2007	Crusaders (New Zealand)	53–0	(Australia) Western Force	Lancaster Park, Christchurch
19:35	Tries: Rico Gear, Mose Tuiali'i, Kieran Read (2), Ross Filipo (3), Richie McCaw; Con: Dan Carter (5); Pen: Dan Carter			Referee: Mark Lawrence (South Africa)

7 April 2007	Reds (Australia)	16–59	(South Africa) Sharks	Lang Park, Brisbane
19:40	Try: John Roe; Con: Clinton Schifcofske; Pen: Clinton Schifcofske (3)		Tries: AJ Venter (2), JP Pietersen (2), Jacques Botes, Brad Barritt, Waylon Murray, Bismarck du Plessis, Keegan Daniel; Con: Ruan Pienaar (5), François Steyn (2)	Attendance: 14,443; Referee: Chris Polluck (New Zealand)

7 April 2007	Stormers (South Africa)	30–8	(South Africa) Lions	Newlands Stadium, Cape Town
17:00	Tries: Peter Grant, De Wet Barry, Naas Olivier; Con: Peter Grant (3); Pen: Peter Grant (3)		Try: Jaque Fourie; Pen: André Pretorius	Referee: Bryce Lawrence (South Africa)

8 April 2007	Brumbies (Australia)	36–10	(Australia) Waratahs	Canberra Stadium, Canberra
19:40	Tries: Mark Gerrard (2), Jone Tawake, Stephen Larkham (2); Con: Julian Huxley (2), Mark Gerrard (2); Pen: Julian Huxley		Try: Rocky Elsom; Con: Peter Hewat; Pen: Peter Hewat	Attendance: 23,097; Referee: Matt Goddard (Australia)

=== Round 11 ===
This week saw the Hurricanes take on the Cheetahs and Hosea Gear became the Hurricanes' hero after scoring a 90-metre try in the final moments of the game. It was also the team's fourth try of the game which gave them a bonus point on top of the win. The following day, the Chiefs thrashed the Western Force 64–36, a game which saw a total of 14 tries being scored, nine of which were scored by the Chiefs, with Roy Kinikinilau and Brendon Leonard each getting hat-tricks. The Crusaders then defeated the Highlanders to climb to the top of the table. The Blues lost to the Sharks at home, going down by 7 points, and the Waratahs won only their second game this season, defeating the Reds, who sit at the bottom of the table. In the last match of the week, the Bulls thrashed the Stormers 49–12.

13 April 2007	Hurricanes (New Zealand)	37–15	(South Africa) Cheetahs	Wellington Regional Stadium, Wellington
19:35	Tries: Chris Masoe, Jerry Collins, Jason Eaton, Hosea Gear; Con: Piri Weepu (4); Pen: Piri Weepu (3)		Tries: Gavin Passens, Juan Smith; Con: Willem de Waal; Pen: Willem de Waal	Attendance: 15,770; Referee: (Australia) Paul Marks

14 April 2007	Chiefs (New Zealand)	64–36	(Australia) Western Force	Waikato Stadium, Hamilton
14:35	Tries: Roy Kinikinilau (3), Lelia Masaga, Brendon Leonard (3), Tanerau Latimer, Tasesa Lavea; Con: Stephen Donald (5); Pen: Stephen Donald (3)		Tries: Nathan Sharpe, Matt Giteau (2), Cameron Shepherd, Drew Mitchell; Con: Matt Giteau (4); Pen: Matt Giteau	Attendance: 13,100; Referee: Craig Joubert (South Africa)

14 April 2007	Highlanders (New Zealand)	3–38	(New Zealand) Crusaders	Carisbrook, Dunedin
17:30	Pen: Nick Evans		Tries: Dan Carter, Casey Laulala (2), Caleb Ralph, Rua Tipoki; Con: Dan Carter (4), Stephen Brett; Pen: Dan Carter	Attendance: 10,000; Referee: Jonathan Kaplan (South Africa)

14 April 2007	Blues (New Zealand)	25–32	(South Africa) Sharks	North Harbour Stadium, Albany
19:35	Tries: Keven Mealamu, David Gibson, Daniel Braid; Con: Isa Nacewa (2); Pen: Isa Nacewa (2)		Tries: JP Pietersen (2), Odwa Ndungane; Con: François Steyn; Pen: Percy Montgomery (2), François Steyn; Drop: François Steyn (2)	Attendance: 20,100; Referee: Stuart Dickinson (Australia)

14 April 2007	Waratahs (Australia)	26–13	(Australia) Reds	Sydney Football Stadium, Sydney
19:40	Tries: Josh Valentine, Benn Robinson; Con: Peter Hewat (2); Pen: Peter Hewat (4)		Tries: Clinton Schifcofske; Con: Clinton Schifcofske; Pen: Clinton Schifcofske (2)	Attendance: 21,872; Referee: Kelvin Deaker (New Zealand)

14 April 2007	Bulls (South Africa)	49–12	(South Africa) Stormers	Loftus Versfeld Stadium, Pretoria
16:00	Tries: Bakkies Botha (2), Wikus van Heerden (2) Pedrie Wannenburg, Heinie Adams, Wynand Olivier; Con: Derick Hougaard (2), Morné Steyn (2); Pen: Derick Hougaard (2)		Tries: Brent Russell, Dylan des Fountain; Con: Peter Grant	Attendance: 50,000; Referee: Marius Jonker (South Africa)

=== Round 12 ===
The Crusaders defeated the Hurricanes in a thrilling encounter which saw Jerry Collins being stretchered off after injuring his neck in a tackle on Rua Tipoki. The Brumbies defeated the Western Force in an all-Australian derby by just two points and the Reds won their second game of the season defeating the Cheetahs. Ben Tune (who is leaving the club after the season) scored the winning try in that match, but the match of the round saw the Chiefs defeat the Sharks to put themselves in contention for a semi-final spot. The Waratahs lost to the Highlanders by a point after Peter Hewat missed another conversion, and in a South African derby, the Bulls thrashed the Lions 31–7. Finally, the Blues lost their away match to the Stormers, but they remain second in the table nonetheless.

20 April 2007	Crusaders (New Zealand)	23–13	(New Zealand) Hurricanes	Lancaster Park, Christchurch
19:35	Tries: Corey Flynn, Ross Filipo; Con: Dan Carter (2); Pen: Dan Carter (3)		Tries: Ma'a Nonu; Con: Piri Weepu; Pen: Piri Weepu (2)	Referee: Paul Honiss (New Zealand)

20 April 2007	Brumbies (Australia)	14–12	(Australia) Western Force	Canberra Stadium, Canberra
19:40	Tries: Jeremy Paul; Pen: Julian Huxley (2), Mark Gerrard		Pen: Matt Giteau (4)	Referee: Stuart Dickinson (Australia)

21 April 2007	Reds (Australia)	23–13	(South Africa) Cheetahs	Lang Park, Queensland
15:30	Tries: James Horwill, Ben Tune; Con: Clinton Schifcofske (2); Pen: Clinton Schifcofske		Tries: Kabamba Floors; Con: Meyer Bosman; Pen: Meyer Bosman (2)	Attendance: 12,500; Referee: Bryce Lawrence (New Zealand)

21 April 2007	Chiefs (New Zealand)	35–27	(South Africa) Sharks	Waikato Stadium, Hamilton
19:35	Tries: Lelia Masaga, Tasesa Lavea (2), Brendon Leonard; Con: Stephen Donald (3); Pen: Stephen Donald (3)		Tries: Bobby Skinstad, Deon Carstens, Bismarck du Plessis, Penalty try Con: Percy Montgomery, François Steyn; Pen: François Steyn	Referee: James Leckie (Australia)

21 April 2007	Waratahs (Australia)	25–26	(New Zealand) Highlanders	Sydney Football Stadium, Sydney
19:40	Tries: Peter Hewat (2), Josh Holmes; Con: Peter Hewat (2); Pen: Peter Hewat (2)		Tries: Viliame Waqaseduadua, Nick Evans, Jason Kawau; Con: Nick Evans; Pen: Nick Evans (3)	Referee: Craig Joubert (South Africa)

21 April 2007	Lions (South Africa)	7–31	(South Africa) Bulls	Ellis Park Stadium, Johannesburg
15:00	Tries: Willem Alberts; Con: André Pretorius		Tries: Wynand Olivier (2), Bryan Habana, Akona Ndungane, JP Nel; Con: Derick Hougaard (3)	Referee: J.C. Fortuin (South Africa)

21 April 2007	Stormers (South Africa)	33–20	(New Zealand) Blues	Newlands Stadium, Cape Town
17:05	Tries: Conrad Jantjes, Luke Watson, Jean de Villiers; Con: Peter Grant (3); Pen: Peter Grant (4)		Tries: Isaia Toeava, Tony Woodcock; Con: David Holwell, Isa Nacewa; Pen: David Holwell (2)	Referee: Matt Goddard (Australia)

=== Round 13 ===
With the semi-final week just around the corner, Week 13 saw some close matches including the opener between the Highlanders and the Hurricanes at the cake tin. The score was 22 – 16 to the Hurricanes at 80 minutes but a final minute try to Toby Morland in the corner turned things around. Nick Evans needed to get the kick over to win the game but was unsuccessful allowing the Hurricanes to win the game lucky to not have the same situation when the Hurricanes lost to the Force in week 6. The force continued their up and down season by comfortably beating the cheetahs. The Waratahs narrowly lost going down to the chiefs. The Brumbies pulled an upset win over the Crusaders to keep their semi final hopes alive. The Sharks dominated the lions to make sure they would at least get a home semi final. The Blues lost their third game in a row going down to the Bulls which slimmed the chances of the Blues securing a semi final spot and helped the Bulls secure a semi final spot. The last game of the week saw the stormers easily put away the Reds.

27 April 2007	Hurricanes (New Zealand)	22–21	(New Zealand) Highlanders	Wellington Regional Stadium, Wellington
19:35	Tries: Jimmy Gopperth, Hosea Gear; Pen: Piri Weepu (4)		Tries: Nick Evans, Toby Morland; Con: Nick Evans; Pen: Nick Evans (3)	Attendance: 19,790; Referee: Bryce Lawrence (New Zealand)

27 April 2007	Waratahs (Australia)	23–28	(New Zealand) Chiefs	Sydney Football Stadium, Sydney
19:40	Tries: Sam Norton-Knight, Lachlan Turner; Con: Peter Hewat (2); Pen: Peter Hewat (3)		Tries: Sitiveni Sivivatu, Liam Messam, Tane Tuipolotu; Con: Stephen Donald (2); Pen: Stephen Donald (3)	Attendance: 16,266; Referee: Willie Roos (South Africa)

27 April 2007	Western Force (Australia)	45–17	(South Africa) Cheetahs	Subiaco Oval, Perth
19:40	Tries: Ryan Cross (2), Scott Staniforth (2), Digby Ioane, Tai McIsaac, AJ Whalley; Con: Matt Giteau (5)		Tries: Philip Burger, Ryno van der Merwe, Kabamba Floors; Con: Wilem De Waal	Attendance: 24,330; Referee: Paul Honiss (New Zealand)

27 April 2007	Bulls (South Africa)	40–19	(New Zealand) Blues	Loftus Versfeld Stadium, Pretoria
19:05	Tries: Pedrie Wannenburg, Wikus van Heerden, Fourie du Preez, Heini Adams; Con: Derick Hougaard (4); Pen: Derick Hougaard (3); Drop: Derick Hougaard		Tries: Troy Flavell; Con: Isa Nacewa; Pen: Isa Nacewa (4)	Referee: Stuart Dickinson (Australia)

28 April 2007	Brumbies (Australia)	15–6	(New Zealand) Crusaders	Canberra Stadium, Canberra
19:40	Pen: Stirling Mortlock (3), Julian Huxley; Drop: Stephen Larkham		Pen: Dan Carter (2)	Attendance: 20,127; Referee: Marius Jonker (South Africa)

28 April 2007	Sharks (South Africa)	33–3	(South Africa) Lions	Kings Park Stadium, Durban
15:00	Tries: JP Pietersen (2), Jacques Botes (2); Con: Percy Montgomery (2); Pen: Percy Montgomery (2), François Steyn		Pen: Earl Rose	Referee: Jonathan Kaplan (South Africa)

28 April 2007	Stormers (South Africa)	37–24	(Australia) Reds	Newlands Stadium, Cape Town
17:05	Tries: Luke Watson (2), Brent Russell (2), Joe van Niekerk; Con: Peter Grant (3); Pen: Peter Grant (2)		Tries: Ben Tune, Sean Hardman; Con: Clinton Schifcofske; Pen: Clinton Schifcofske (4)	Referee: Steve Walsh (New Zealand)

=== Round 14 ===
Both South African contenders—the Bulls and the Sharks—faced the possibility of a home semi-final. The weekend started with an upset when the Chiefs beat the Crusaders 30–24 at Lancaster Park. This result gave the Sharks the opportunity to take the top spot if they won in Cape Town. The Blues kept their chance at the title with a 33–6 victory against the Western Force. Later, the Brumbies maintained their semi-final potential with a 29–10 victory against the Highlanders. Waratahs defeated the Hurricanes away in Wellington 38–14. Cheetahs beat the Lions 16–10. The first main game of the day was the Stormers vs the Sharks. The Sharks claimed a 36–10 victory, becoming the first South African side to finish at the top of the table at the end of the round-robin stage in the Super 14 competition's history. The last game of the weekend featured the Bulls and the Reds, the former of which needed a bonus-point win to reach the semi-finals. Initially, the Reds were ahead 3–0, but by a quarter of the way into the match, the Bulls were on track for their bonus-point win. Early in the second half, the Bulls reached the 45-point margin needed to push them up to third place. The Bulls went on to achieve a margin of over 72 points over the Reds, bringing them to second place and securing a home semi-final at Loftus Versfeld; their final winning margin on 89 points set a new Super Rugby record.

4 May 2007	Crusaders (New Zealand)	24–30	(New Zealand) Chiefs	Lancaster Park, Christchurch
19:35	Tries: Richie McCaw, Ross Filipo; Con: Stephen Brett; Pen: Stephen Brett (4)		Tries: Sitiveni Sivivatu (2); Con: Stephen Donald; Pen: Stephen Donald (6)	Referee: Bryce Lawrence (New Zealand)

5 May 2007	Western Force (Australia)	6–33	(New Zealand) Blues	Subiaco Oval, Perth
19:05	Pen: Matt Giteau (2)		Tries: Rudi Wulf, John Afoa, Keven Mealamu, Tony Woodcock; Con: Luke McAlister (2); Pen: Luke McAlister (3)	Referee: Jonathan Kaplan (South Africa)

5 May 2007	Highlanders (New Zealand)	10–29	(Australia) Brumbies	Carisbrook, Dunedin
17:30	Tries: Jason Kawau; Con: Nick Evans; Pen: Nick Evans		Tries: Julian Huxley, Adam Ashley-Cooper, Stirling Mortlock, Mark Chisholm; Con: Stirling Mortlock (3); Pen: Stirling Mortlock	Referee: J.C. Fortuin (South Africa)

5 May 2007	Hurricanes (New Zealand)	14–38	(Australia) Waratahs	Wellington Regional Stadium, Wellington
19:35	Tries: Jimmy Gopperth, Jerry Collins; Con: Jimmy Gopperth, Piri Weepu		Tries: Dean Mumm, Lachlan Turner, Lote Tuqiri, Ben Jacobs; Con: Peter Hewat (3); Pen: Peter Hewat (4)	Attendance: 25,290; Referee: Craig Joubert (South Africa)

5 May 2007	Lions (South Africa)	10–16	(South Africa) Cheetahs	Ellis Park Stadium, Johannesburg
15:00	Tries: Ashwin Willemse; Con: Earl Rose; Pen: André Pretorius		Tries: Eddie Fredericks; Con: Willem de Waal; Pen: Willem de Waal (2); Drop: Bevin Fortuin	Referee: Marius Jonker (South Africa)

5 May 2007	Stormers (South Africa)	10–36	(South Africa) Sharks	Newlands Stadium, Cape Town
17:05	Tries: Peter Grant; Con: Peter Grant; Pen: Peter Grant		Tries: Ryan Kankowski, Waylon Murray, Percy Montgomery, François Steyn, JP Pietersen; Con: Percy Montgomery (4); Pen: Percy Montgomery	Attendance: 48,000; Referee: Mark Lawrence (South Africa)

5 May 2007	Bulls (South Africa)	92–3	(Australia) Reds	Loftus Versfeld Stadium, Pretoria
19:10	Tries: Bryan Habana (2), Pierre Spies (2), Wikus van Heerden (2), Derick Kuün (2), Fourie du Preez, Wynand Olivier, Gary Botha, Pedrie Wannenburg, Jaco Van Der Westhuyzen; Con: Derick Hougaard (11), Morné Steyn; Pen: Derick Hougaard		Pen: Clinton Schifcofske	Referee: Kelvin Deaker (New Zealand)

== Finals ==
=== Semi finals ===
12 May 2007
15:00

Sharks (South Africa)	34–18	(New Zealand) Blues
Tries: Johann Muller, Butch James, Waylon Murray; Con: Percy Montgomery (2); Pen: Percy Montgomery (4); Drop: Butch James		Tries: Rudi Wulf, Isa Nacewa; Con: Isa Nacewa; Pen: Isa Nacewa (2)

Kings Park Stadium, Durban
Attendance: 52,173
Referee: Stuart Dickinson (Australia)

12 May 2007
17:30

Bulls (South Africa)	27–12	(New Zealand) Crusaders
Pen: Derick Hougaard (8); Drop: Derick Hougaard		Pen: Dan Carter (4)

Loftus Versfeld Stadium, Pretoria
Attendance: ~53,000
Referee: Matt Goddard (Australia)

=== Grand final ===
The match had four tries – two by each team, and the last of which was scored by Bulls' wing Bryan Habana in the 82nd minute to give his team the trophy. It was the first Super rugby final to be played in South Africa, as well as the first all South African final, and the first final with a South African winner.

19 May 2007
15:00

Sharks (South Africa)	19–20	(South Africa) Bulls
Tries: Pietersen, Van den Berg; Pen: Montgomery (3)		Tries: Spies, Habana; Con: Hougaard (2); Pen: Hougaard (2)

Kings Park Stadium, Durban
Attendance: 54,000
Referee: Steve Walsh (New Zealand)

FB	15	Percy Montgomery
RW	14	François Steyn
OC	13	Waylon Murray
IC	12	Brad Barritt
LW	11	JP Pietersen
FH	10	Butch James
SH	9	Ruan Pienaar
N8	8	Ryan Kankowski
BF	7	AJ Venter
OF	6	Jacques Botes
RL	5	Johann Muller
LL	4	Johan Ackermann
TP	3	BJ Botha
HK	2	John Smit (c)
LP	1	Deon Carstens
Substitutes:
HK	16	Bismarck du Plessis
LP	17	Tendai Mtawarira
RL	18	Albert van den Berg
N8	19	Warren Britz
BL	20	Bob Skinstad
FH	21	Rory Kockott
OC	22	Adrian Jacobs
Coach:
(South Africa) Dick Muir

FB	15	Johan Roets
RW	14	Akona Ndungane
OC	13	JP Nel
IC	12	Wynand Olivier
LW	11	Bryan Habana
FH	10	Derick Hougaard
SH	9	Fourie du Preez
N8	8	Pierre Spies
BF	7	Wikus van Heerden
OF	6	Pedrie Wannenburg
RL	5	Victor Matfield (c)
LL	4	Bakkies Botha
TP	3	Rayno Gerber
HK	2	Gary Botha
LP	1	Gurthro Steenkamp
Substitutions:
HK	16	Jaco Engels
LP	17	Danie Thiart
RL	18	Danie Rossouw
N8	19	Derick Kuün
SH	20	Heinie Adams
FH	21	Morné Steyn
FB	22	Jaco van der Westhuyzen
Coach:
(South Africa) Heyneke Meyer

Man of the Match:
Victor Matfield (Bulls)
Assistant referees:
Lyndon Bray (New Zealand)
Bryce Lawrence (New Zealand)
Television match official:
Kelvin Deaker (New Zealand)
Assessor: Tappe Henning (South Africa)

== Player statistics ==
=== Leading try scorers ===
Top 3 try scorers (Stats)
Pos	Name	Tries	Pld	Team
1	JP Pietersen	12	15	Sharks
2	Bryan Habana	8	15	Bulls
2	Lelia Masaga	8	13	Chiefs
4	Cameron Shepherd	7	13	Force
4	Rico Gear	7	14	Crusaders

=== Leading point scorers ===
Top 3 overall point scorers (Stats)
Pos	Name	Points	Pld	Team
1	Stephen Donald	164 (2T, 26C, 34P)	13	Chiefs
2	Derick Hougaard	161 (0T, 28C, 33P, 3DG)	15	Bulls
3	Peter Hewat	156 (2T, 19C, 36P)	13	Waratahs
