= 2005 Super 12 season =

Men's rugby union club competition

2005 Super 12
- Countries: Australia; South Africa; New Zealand
- Tournament format(s): Round-robin and knockout
- Champions: (New Zealand) Crusaders (5th title)
- Matches played: 69
- Attendance: 1,806,017 (26,174 per match)
- Top point scorer(s): Peter Hewat (174; Waratahs)
- Top try scorer(s): Rico Gear (15; Crusaders)

The 2005 Super 12 season was the tenth season of the Super 12, contested by teams from Australia, New Zealand and South Africa. The season ran from February to May 2005, with each team playing all the others once. At the end of the regular season, the top four teams entered the playoff semi finals, with the first placed team playing the fourth and the second placed team playing the third. The winner of each semi final qualified for the final, which was contested by the Crusaders and New South Wales Waratahs at Lancaster Park, Christchurch. The Crusaders won 35–25 to win their fifth Super 12 title.

This was the final season of Super 12 before the expansion to Super 14 with the Western Force and Cheetahs.

== Table ==
Key to colours
Top four teams advance to playoffs

	Team	Pld	W	D	L	PF	PA	PD	BP	Pts
1	(New Zealand) Crusaders	11	9	0	2	459	281	178	8	45
2	(Australia) Waratahs	11	9	0	2	322	174	148	5	41
3	(South Africa) Bulls	11	7	0	4	301	229	72	6	34
4	(New Zealand) Hurricanes	11	8	0	3	281	248	33	2	34
5	(Australia) Brumbies	11	5	1	5	260	266	−6	7	29
6	(New Zealand) Chiefs	11	5	1	5	272	250	22	6	28
7	(New Zealand) Blues	11	6	0	5	243	216	27	3	27
8	(New Zealand) Highlanders	11	6	1	4	221	214	7	1	27
9	(South Africa) Stormers	11	3	1	7	215	320	−105	4	18
10	(Australia) Reds	11	3	0	8	185	282	−97	5	17
11	(South Africa) Cats	11	1	1	9	226	326	−100	7	13
12	(South Africa) Sharks	11	1	1	9	205	384	−179	5	11

== Results ==
=== Round 1 ===
25 February 2005

Stormers (South Africa)	26–12	(South Africa) Sharks

Newlands Stadium, Cape Town
Attendance: 48,719

25 February 2005

Highlanders (New Zealand)	14–30	(New Zealand) Blues

Carisbrook, Dunedin
Attendance: 20,106

25 February 2005

Waratahs (Australia)	25–7	(New Zealand) Chiefs

ANZ Stadium, Sydney
Attendance: 30,815

26 February 2005

Cats (South Africa)	23–17	(South Africa) Bulls

Ellis Park Stadium, Johannesburg
Attendance: 49,040

26 February 2005

Brumbies (Australia)	32–21	(New Zealand) Crusaders

Canberra Stadium, Canberra
Attendance: 24,115

26 February 2005

Reds (Australia)	10–24	(New Zealand) Hurricanes

Ballymore Stadium, Brisbane
Attendance: 20,097

=== Round 2 ===
4 March 2005

Blues (New Zealand)	18–15	(Australia) Reds

Eden Park, Auckland
Attendance: 25,542

4 March 2005

Brumbies (Australia)	21–19	(South Africa) Bulls

Canberra Stadium, Canberra
Attendance: 20,927

5 March 2005

Highlanders (New Zealand)	16–16	(South Africa) Stormers

Rugby Park Stadium, Invercargill
Attendance: 8,141

5 March 2005

Cats (South Africa)	32–45	(New Zealand) Hurricanes

Ellis Park Stadium, Johannesburg
Attendance: 27,882

5 March 2005

Sharks (South Africa)	13–36	(Australia) Waratahs

ABSA Stadium, Durban
Attendance: 29,322

5 March 2005

Crusaders (New Zealand)	50–18	(New Zealand) Chiefs

AMI Stadium, Christchurch
Attendance: 25,128

=== Round 3 ===
11 March 2005
19:35

Sharks (South Africa)	23–29	(New Zealand) Hurricanes

Kings Park, Durban
Attendance: 20,442

11 March 2005

Highlanders (New Zealand)	23–0	(South Africa) Bulls

Carisbrook, Dunedin
Attendance: 9,030

11 March 2005

Brumbies (Australia)	22–19	(South Africa) Stormers

Canberra Stadium, Canberra
Attendance: 22,316

12 March 2005

Crusaders (New Zealand)	59–24	(Australia) Reds

Trafalgar Park, Nelson
Attendance: 15,514

12 March 2005

Cats (South Africa)	19–40	(Australia) Waratahs

Ellis Park Stadium, Johannesburg
Attendance: 36,365

12 March 2005

Chiefs (New Zealand)	18–9	(New Zealand) Blues

Waikato Stadium, Hamilton
Attendance: 23,095

=== Round 4 ===
18 March 2005

Chiefs (New Zealand)	6–20	(Australia) Reds

Waikato Stadium, Hamilton
Attendance: 13,641

19 March 2005

Cats (South Africa)	29–34	(Australia) Brumbies

Ellis Park Stadium, Johannesburg
Attendance: 14,283

19 March 2005

Hurricanes (New Zealand)	12–21	(South Africa) Bulls

Wellington Stadium, Wellington
Attendance: 23,300

19 March 2005

Sharks (South Africa)	7–43	(New Zealand) Highlanders

Kings Park Stadium, Durban
Attendance: 26,351

19 March 2005

Blues (New Zealand)	19–41	(New Zealand) Crusaders

Eden Park, Auckland
Attendance: 39,000

19 March 2005

Waratahs (Australia)	25–10	(South Africa) Stormers

ANZ Stadium, Sydney
Attendance: 31,184

=== Round 5 ===
25 March 2005

Cats (South Africa)	12–16	(New Zealand) Highlanders

Ellis Park Stadium, Johannesburg
Attendance: 20,000

25 March 2005

Hurricanes (New Zealand)	12–9	(South Africa) Stormers

Arena Manawatu, Palmerston North
Attendance: 14,000

26 March 2005

Sharks (South Africa)	36–24	(Australia) Brumbies

Kings Park, Durban
Attendance: 23,557

26 March 2005

Waratahs (Australia)	42–12	(South Africa) Bulls

Sydney Football Stadium, Sydney
Attendance: 25,133

=== Round 6 ===
1 April 2005

Hurricanes (New Zealand)	28–16	(New Zealand) Chiefs

Wellington Stadium, Wellington
Attendance: 23,325

1 April 2005

Reds (Australia)	16–23	(New Zealand) Highlanders

Ballymore Stadium, Brisbane
Attendance: 19,567

2 April 2005

Blues (New Zealand)	17–0	(Australia) Brumbies

Eden Park, Auckland
Attendance: 31,503

2 April 2005

Waratahs (Australia)	27–33	(New Zealand) Crusaders

Sydney Football Stadium, Sydney
Attendance: 39,363

=== Round 7 ===
8 April 2005

Highlanders (New Zealand)	19–18	(Australia) Brumbies

Carisbrook, Dunedin
Attendance: 15,000

9 April 2005

Stormers (South Africa)	15–13	(Australia) Reds

Newlands Stadium, Cape Town
Attendance: 39,531

9 April 2005

Bulls (South Africa)	35–20	(New Zealand) Crusaders

Loftus Versfeld Stadium, Pretoria
Attendance: 27,267

9 April 2005

Chiefs (New Zealand)	40–5	(South Africa) Sharks

Waikato Stadium, Hamilton
Attendance: 11,000

9 April 2005

Blues (New Zealand)	23–6	(South Africa) Cats

North Harbour Stadium, Albany
Attendance: 12,677

10 April 2005

Hurricanes (New Zealand)	26–24	(Australia) Waratahs

Wellington Stadium, Wellington
Attendance: 25,400

=== Round 8 ===
15 April 2005

Bulls (South Africa)	32–7	(Australia) Reds

Loftus Versfeld Stadium, Pretoria
Attendance: 33,243

15 April 2005

Chiefs (New Zealand)	45–14	(South Africa) Cats

Waikato Stadium, Hamilton
Attendance: 12,223

16 April 2005

Stormers (South Africa)	23–51	(New Zealand) Crusaders

Newlands Stadium, Cape Town
Attendance: 40,153

16 April 2005

Blues (New Zealand)	36–13	(South Africa) Sharks

Eden Park, Auckland
Attendance: 26,794

16 April 2005

Brumbies (Australia)	6–10	(Australia) Waratahs

Canberra Stadium, Canberra
Attendance: 27,040

=== Round 9 ===
22 April 2005

Hurricanes (New Zealand)	16–26	(New Zealand) Highlanders

Wellington Stadium, Wellington
Attendance: 30,270

23 April 2005

Bulls (South Africa)	29–26	(New Zealand) Chiefs

Loftus Versfeld Stadium, Pretoria
Attendance: 26,382

23 April 2005

Stormers (South Africa)	24–37	(New Zealand) Blues

Newlands Stadium, Cape Town
Attendance: 27,000

23 April 2005

Crusaders (New Zealand)	40–36	(South Africa) Cats

AMI Stadium, Christchurch
Attendance: 34,000

23 April 2005

Reds (Australia)	30–25	(South Africa) Sharks

Ballymore Stadium, Brisbane
Attendance: 12,274

=== Round 10 ===
29 April 2005

Bulls (South Africa)	38–24	(New Zealand) Blues

Loftus Versfeld Stadium, Pretoria
Attendance: 34,357

29 April 2005

Crusaders (New Zealand)	77–34	(South Africa) Sharks

AMI Stadium, Christchurch
Attendance: 24,500

29 April 2005

Reds (Australia)	21–15	(South Africa) Cats

Lang Park, Brisbane
Attendance: 10,482

30 April 2005

Stormers (South Africa)	34–37	(New Zealand) Chiefs

Newlands Stadium, Cape Town
Attendance: 25,000

30 April 2005

Highlanders (New Zealand)	20–41	(Australia) Waratahs

Carisbrook, Dunedin
Attendance: 16,033

30 April 2005

Hurricanes (New Zealand)	49–37	(Australia) Brumbies

Wellington Stadium, Wellington
Attendance: 30,560

=== Round 11 ===
6 May 2005

Blues (New Zealand)	10–22	(New Zealand) Hurricanes

Eden Park, Auckland
Attendance: 45,017

6 May 2005

Waratahs (Australia)	27–8	(Australia) Reds

Stadium Australia, Sydney
Attendance: 38,220

7 May 2005

Sharks (South Africa)	17–23	(South Africa) Bulls

Kings Park Stadium, Durban
Attendance: 31,342

7 May 2005

Stormers (South Africa)	25–20	(South Africa) Cats

Newlands Stadium, Cape Town
Attendance: 27,503

7 May 2005

Highlanders (New Zealand)	13–27	(New Zealand) Crusaders

Carisbrook, Dunedin
Attendance: 22,000

7 May 2005

Brumbies (Australia)	28–28	(New Zealand) Chiefs

Canberra Stadium, Canberra
Attendance: 20,077

=== Round 12 ===
13 May 2005

Crusaders (New Zealand)	40–20	(New Zealand) Hurricanes

Lancaster Park, Christchurch
Attendance: 35,700

13 May 2005

Waratahs (Australia)	25–20	(New Zealand) Blues

Sydney Football Stadium, Sydney
Attendance: 36,031

14 May 2005

Bulls (South Africa)	75–14	(South Africa) Stormers

Loftus Versfeld Stadium, Pretoria
Attendance: 50,000

14 May 2005

Cats (South Africa)	20–20	(South Africa) Sharks

Vodacom Park, Bloemfontein
Attendance: 8,675

14 May 2005

Chiefs (New Zealand)	31–8	(New Zealand) Highlanders

Waikato Stadium, Hamilton
Attendance: 20,317

14 May 2005

Reds (Australia)	21–38	(Australia) Brumbies

Lang Park, Brisbane
Attendance: 28,233

== Finals ==
=== Semi-finals ===
20 May 2005

Crusaders (New Zealand)	47–7	(New Zealand) Hurricanes
Try: Hamilton (3); Gear; Carter; Somerville; Con: Carter (4); Pen: Carter (3)		Try: Gopperth; Con: Gopperth

Lancaster Park, Christchurch
Attendance: 29,000
Referee: Andrew Cole (Australia)

21 May 2005

Waratahs (Australia)	23–13	(South Africa) Bulls
Try: Turinui; Grey; Con: Hewat (2); Pen: Hewat (3)		Try: Roets; Con: Steyn; Pen: Steyn (2)

Stadium Australia, Sydney
Attendance: 35,433
Referee: Steve Walsh (New Zealand)

=== Grand final ===
28 May 2005

Crusaders (New Zealand)	35–25	(Australia) Waratahs
Try: Hamilton; Hewett; MacDonald; Ralph; Con: Carter (3); Pen: Carter (2); Drop: Mauger		Try: Rogers (2); Waugh; Con: Hewat; Rogers; Pen: Hewat (2)

Lancaster Park, Christchurch
Attendance: 36,500

Crusaders	Waratahs

FB	15	Leon MacDonald
RW	14	Rico Gear
OC	13	Caleb Ralph
IC	12	Aaron Mauger
LW	11	Scott Hamilton
FH	10	Dan Carter
SH	9	Justin Marshall
N8	8	Mose Tuiali'i
OF	7	Richie McCaw (c)
BF	6	Reuben Thorne
RL	5	Ross Filipo
LL	4	Chris Jack
TP	3	Greg Somerville
HK	2	Corey Flynn
LP	1	David Hewett
Substitutes:
HK	16	Tone Kopelani
PR	17	Campbell Johnstone
FL	18	Sam Broomhall
FL	19	Johnny Leo'o
SH	20	Jamie Nutbrown
FH	21	Andrew Mehrtens
CE	22	Casey Laulala
Coach:
(New Zealand) Robbie Deans

FB	15	Mat Rogers
RW	14	Peter Hewat
OC	13	Morgan Turinui
IC	12	Nathan Grey
LW	11	Lote Tuqiri
FH	10	Lachlan MacKay
SH	9	Chris Whitaker(c)
N8	8	David Lyons
OF	7	Phil Waugh
BF	6	Rocky Elsom
RL	5	Daniel Vickerman
LL	4	Justin Harrison
TP	3	Al Baxter
HK	2	Brendan Cannon
LP	1	Matt Dunning
Substitutions:
HK	16	Adam Freier
PR	17	Gareth Hardy
LK	18	Alex Kanaar
N8	19	Stephen Hoiles
SH	20	Chris O'Young
FH	21	Shaun Berne
CE	22	Cameron Shepherd
Coach:
(Australia) Ewen McKenzie

== Player statistics ==
=== Leading try-scorers ===
Top 3 try scorers
Pos	Name	Tries	Team
1	Rico Gear	15	Crusaders
2	Peter Hewat	10	Waratahs
3	Bryan Habana	9	Bulls

=== Leading point-scorers ===
Top 3 point scorers
Pos	Name	Points	Team
1	Peter Hewat	174	Waratahs
2	Dan Carter	171	Crusaders
3	Jimmy Gopperth	139	Hurricanes

== Notes and references ==
=== Further reading ===
- McIlraith, M. (2005). Ten Years of Super 12. Auckland: Hodder Moa. ISBN 1-86971-025-8.
