= 2006 Super 14 season =

Men's rugby union club competition

2006 Super 14
- Countries: Australia; South Africa; New Zealand
- Tournament format(s): Round-robin and Knockout
- Champions: (New Zealand) Crusaders (6th title)
- Matches played: 94
- Attendance: 2,321,833 (24,700 per match)
- Tries scored: 447 (4.76 per match)
- Top point scorer(s): Dan Carter (221; Crusaders)
- Top try scorer(s): Lome Fa'atau (10; Hurricanes)

The 2006 Super 14 season started on 10 February 2006. The Grand Final was held on 27 May 2006. Super 14 is a provincial rugby union competition with 14 teams from New Zealand, Australia and South Africa. This season was the first of the expansion, which saw two new teams, the Western Force and the Cheetahs, join the Super 12/14. The addition of two new teams led to the name change from the Super 12. It was also the first year for a new Super 14 trophy.

The season saw the first joint commercial by the three SANZAR unions since 1996. The commercial was filmed in Ukraine and is set in a laundromat. The ad was attempting to draw interest, with the motto More teams, more games and more excitement at the end of the commercial. One player from each of the 14 teams was present, except for the Waratahs. A local extra named "Ouri" filled the role of Mat Rogers who injured his back in a test match for the Wallabies against Wales.

By the end of round twelve, critics began speculating that the pre-season favourites, the Crusaders, were losing their form after a draw against the winless Western Force and then a shock loss to the Stormers. However they bounced back against the Bulls with a four-try bonus point victory. After a few results fell in their favour they were able to comfortably beat the Brumbies, and finished for the second consecutive season on top of the ladder. The Crusaders won the Super 14 after defeating the Hurricanes in Christchurch in the final, 19–12 in misty conditions. There was 94 matches held over three and a half months, with each team playing one full round robin against the 13 other teams and the playoffs involving two semi-finals and a final. Every team got one bye over the 14 rounds.

== Table ==
Key to colours
Top four teams advance to playoffs

	Team	Pld	W	D	L	PF	PA	PD	BP	Pts
1	(New Zealand) Crusaders	13	11	1	1	412	210	+202	5	51
2	(New Zealand) Hurricanes	13	10	0	3	328	226	+102	7	47
3	(Australia) Waratahs	13	9	0	4	362	192	+170	9	45
4	(South Africa) Bulls	13	7	1	5	355	290	+65	7	38
5	(South Africa) Sharks	13	7	0	6	361	297	+64	10	38
6	(Australia) Brumbies	13	8	1	4	326	269	+57	4	38
7	(New Zealand) Chiefs	13	7	1	5	325	298	+27	6	36
8	(New Zealand) Blues	13	6	0	7	290	344	−54	5	29
9	(New Zealand) Highlanders	13	6	0	7	228	276	−48	3	27
10	(South Africa) Cheetahs	13	5	0	8	272	367	−95	7	27
11	(South Africa) Stormers	13	4	1	8	263	334	−71	5	23
12	(Australia) Reds	13	4	0	9	240	320	−80	6	22
13	(South Africa) Cats	13	2	1	10	220	405	−185	5	15
14	(Australia) Force	13	1	2	10	223	373	−150	4	12

== South African relegation ==
Originally, the fifth-placed South African side was to be replaced by the Spears, who were initially planned to compete in the 2007 and 2008 competitions. However, the South African Rugby Union (SARU) revisited the decision to admit the Spears, and announced on 19 April 2006 that the Spears would not enter the competition.

On 5 August 2006, the High Court of South Africa threw a potential monkey wrench into the 2007 season when it issued its ruling in the Spears' legal challenge to the decision. It ruled that the Spears had a valid contract with SA Rugby, the commercial arm of SARU, to be included in the 2007 and 2008 Super 14. SA Rugby and SARU are expected to appeal the decision. If the Spears win their court challenge, the Lions, the new name for the Cats, will be relegated for 2007 and will play a test match with the lowest South African team on the 2007 ladder, other than the Spears, for a place in the 2008 competition.

On 8 September 2006, the Golden Lions Rugby Union, the company that operates the Cats franchise, announced that the franchise would be known in the future as the Lions.

== Results ==
=== Round 1 ===
10 February 2006
19:35

Blues (New Zealand)	19–37	(New Zealand) Hurricanes

Eden Park, Auckland
Attendance: 35,200

10 February 2006
19:05

Western Force (Australia)	10–25	(Australia) Brumbies

Subiaco Oval, Perth
Attendance: 37,037

10 February 2006
19:10

Cheetahs (South Africa)	18–30	(South Africa) Bulls

Free State Stadium, Bloemfontein
Attendance: 37,383

11 February 2006
19:35

Crusaders (New Zealand)	38–15	(New Zealand) Highlanders

Lancaster Park, Christchurch
Attendance: 28,000

11 February 2006
19:40

Reds (Australia)	12–16	(Australia) Waratahs

Lang Park, Brisbane
Attendance: 38,947

11 February 2006
17:00

Cats (South Africa)	12–23	(South Africa) Stormers

Ellis Park Stadium, Johannesburg
Attendance: 27,997

11 February 2006
19:10

Sharks (South Africa)	30–21	(New Zealand) Chiefs

Kings Park Stadium, Durban
Attendance: 26,512

=== Round 2 ===
17 February 2006
19:35

Highlanders (New Zealand)	25–13	(New Zealand) Blues

Carisbrook, Dunedin
Attendance: 17,000

17 February 2006
18:00

Cats (South Africa)	21–16	(New Zealand) Chiefs

Ellis Park Stadium, Johannesburg
Attendance: 41,650

17 February 2006
20:00

Bulls (South Africa)	21–27	(Australia) Brumbies

Loftus Versfeld Stadium, Pretoria
Attendance: 41,650

18 February 2006
19:35

Hurricanes (New Zealand)	29–5	(Australia) Western Force

Yarrow Stadium, New Plymouth
Attendance: 14,000

18 February 2006
19:00

Reds (Australia)	21–47	(New Zealand) Crusaders

Lang Park, Brisbane
Attendance: 23,551

18 February 2006
17:00

Sharks (South Africa)	26–27	(South Africa) Cheetahs

Kings Park Stadium, Durban
Attendance: 28,256

18 February 2006
19:10

Stormers (South Africa)	26–32	(Australia) Waratahs

Newlands Stadium, Cape Town
Attendance: 32,157

=== Round 3 ===
24 February 2006
19:35

Hurricanes (New Zealand)	29–16	(South Africa) Cats

Wellington Regional Stadium, Wellington
Attendance: 23,400

24 February 2006
19:05

Western Force (Australia)	9–26	(New Zealand) Chiefs

Subiaco Oval, Perth
Attendance: 29,000

24 February 2006
19:10

Stormers (South Africa)	15–15	(Australia) Brumbies

Newlands Stadium, Cape Town
Attendance: 35,000

25 February 2006
17:30

Crusaders (New Zealand)	22–20	(South Africa) Sharks

Fraser Park, Timaru
Attendance: 10,000

25 February 2006
19:35

Reds (Australia)	20–21	(New Zealand) Blues

Lang Park, Brisbane
Attendance: 21,154

25 February 2006
17:00

Bulls (South Africa)	26–17	(Australia) Waratahs

Loftus Versfeld Stadium, Pretoria
Attendance: 30,601

25 February 2006
19:10

Cheetahs (South Africa)	12–17	(New Zealand) Highlanders

Free State Stadium, Bloemfontein
Attendance: 21,373

=== Round 4 ===
3 March 2006
19:35

Chiefs (New Zealand)	35–17	(Australia) Reds

Waikato Stadium, Hamilton
Attendance: 12,500

3 March 2006
19:40

Brumbies (Australia)	28–7	(South Africa) Cats

Canberra Stadium, Canberra
Attendance: 19,059

4 March 2006
15:30

Waratahs (Australia)	31–16	(South Africa) Sharks

Sydney Football Stadium, Sydney
Attendance: 25,619

4 March 2006
19:35

Crusaders (New Zealand)	39–10	(New Zealand) Blues

Lancaster Park, Christchurch
Attendance: 30,000

4 March 2006
17:00

Stormers (South Africa)	15–30	(New Zealand) Highlanders

Newlands Stadium, Cape Town
Attendance: 34,000

4 March 2006
19:10

Cheetahs (South Africa)	27–25	(New Zealand) Hurricanes

Free State Stadium, Bloemfontein
Attendance: 13,000

=== Round 5 ===
10 March 2006
19:35

Chiefs (New Zealand)	19–25	(New Zealand) Crusaders

Waikato Stadium, Hamilton
Attendance: 24,300

10 March 2006
19:40

Waratahs (Australia)	50–3	(South Africa) Cats

Sydney Football Stadium, Sydney
Attendance: 23,986

11 March 2006
19:00

Brumbies (Australia)	35–30	(South Africa) Sharks

Canberra Stadium, Canberra
Attendance: 18,237

11 March 2006
20:05

Reds (Australia)	29–18	(Australia) Western Force

Lang Park, Brisbane
Attendance: 21,373

11 March 2006
17:00

Bulls (South Africa)	23–16	(New Zealand) Highlanders

Loftus Versfeld Stadium, Pretoria
Attendance: 39,887

11 March 2006
19:10

Stormers (South Africa)	19–23	(New Zealand) Hurricanes

Newlands Stadium, Cape Town
Attendance: 32,000

=== Round 6 ===
17 March 2006
19:35

Crusaders (New Zealand)	43–15	(South Africa) Cats

Lancaster Park, Christchurch
Attendance: 20,888

17 March 2006
19:00

Western Force (Australia)	7–32	(Australia) Waratahs

Subiaco Oval, Perth
Attendance: 26,140

17 March 2006
19:10

Bulls (South Africa)	23–26	(New Zealand) Hurricanes

Loftus Versfeld Stadium, Pretoria
Attendance: 38,855

18 March 2006
17:30

Blues (New Zealand)	26–15	(Australia) Brumbies

Eden Park, Auckland
Attendance: 26,135

18 March 2006
19:35

Highlanders (New Zealand)	11–26	(South Africa) Sharks

Carisbrook, Dunedin
Attendance: 11,500

18 March 2006
17:00

Stormers (South Africa)	25–31	(South Africa) Cheetahs

Newlands Stadium, Cape Town
Attendance: 30,000

=== Round 7 ===
24 March 2006
19:00

Hurricanes (New Zealand)	23–17	(South Africa) Sharks

Wellington Regional Stadium, Wellington
Attendance: 19,800

24 March 2006
20:05

Waratahs (Australia)	43–9	(New Zealand) Blues

Sydney Football Stadium, Sydney
Attendance: 30,978

24 March 2006
19:10

Cheetahs (South Africa)	10–6	(Australia) Reds

Free State Stadium, Bloemfontein
Attendance: 16,000

25 March 2006
16:30

Brumbies (Australia)	28–26	(New Zealand) Chiefs

Canberra Stadium, Canberra
Attendance: 17,217

25 March 2006
19:35

Highlanders (New Zealand)	16–14	(South Africa) Cats

Rugby Park Stadium, Invercargill
Attendance: 7,902

25 March 2006
20:05

Western Force (Australia)	21–30	(South Africa) Bulls

Subiaco Oval, Perth
Attendance: 23,392

=== Round 8 ===
31 March 2006
19:00

Blues (New Zealand)	30–17	(South Africa) Bulls

Eden Park, Auckland
Attendance: 21,233

31 March 2006
20:05

Waratahs (Australia)	26–3	(South Africa) Cheetahs

Sydney Football Stadium, Sydney
Attendance: 25,296

31 March 2006
19:10

Western Force (Australia)	25–26	(South Africa) Stormers

Subiaco Oval, Perth
Attendance: 24,507

1 April 2006
17:30

Hurricanes (New Zealand)	11–20	(New Zealand) Crusaders

Wellington Regional Stadium, Wellington
Attendance: 34,500

1 April 2006
19:35

Chiefs (New Zealand)	16–13	(New Zealand) Highlanders

Waikato Stadium, Hamilton
Attendance: 14,607

1 April 2006
17:00

Sharks (South Africa)	36–28	(Australia) Reds

Kings Park Stadium, Durban
Attendance: 27,700

=== Round 9 ===
7 April 2006
19:35

Crusaders (New Zealand)	17–11	(Australia) Waratahs

Lancaster Park, Christchurch
Attendance: 30,000

8 April 2006
14:35

Highlanders (New Zealand)	25–22	(Australia) Western Force

Carisbrook, Dunedin
Attendance: 9,500

8 April 2006
17:30

Chiefs (New Zealand)	26–26	(South Africa) Bulls

Waikato Stadium, Hamilton
Attendance: 12,500

8 April 2006
19:35

Blues (New Zealand)	32–15	(South Africa) Stormers

Eden Park, Auckland
Attendance: 23,013

8 April 2006
19:40

Brumbies (Australia)	53–20	(South Africa) Cheetahs

Canberra Stadium, Canberra
Attendance: 17,117

8 April 2006
17:00

Cats (South Africa)	16–23	(Australia) Reds

Ellis Park Stadium, Johannesburg
Attendance: 12,990

=== Round 10 ===
14 April 2006
19:35

Blues (New Zealand)	39–8	(Australia) Western Force

North Harbour Stadium, Albany
Attendance: 13,500

15 April 2006
17:30

Crusaders (New Zealand)	53–17	(South Africa) Cheetahs

Lancaster Park, Christchurch
Attendance: 21,500

15 April 2006
19:35

Chiefs (New Zealand)	30–20	(South Africa) Stormers

Baypark Stadium, Mount Maunganui
Attendance: 16,500

15 April 2006
19:40

Reds (Australia)	20–19	(South Africa) Bulls

Lang Park, Brisbane
Attendance: 16,033

15 April 2006
17:00

Cats (South Africa)	8–36	(South Africa) Sharks

Ellis Park Stadium, Johannesburg
Attendance: 23,072

16 April 2006
14:35

Highlanders (New Zealand)	13–29	(New Zealand) Hurricanes

Carisbrook, Dunedin
Attendance: 11,000

16 April 2006
19:40

Waratahs (Australia)	37–14	(Australia) Brumbies

Sydney Football Stadium, Sydney
Attendance: 36,656

=== Round 11 ===
21 April 2006
19:35

Chiefs (New Zealand)	33–32	(South Africa) Cheetahs

Waikato Stadium, Hamilton
Attendance: 11,000

21 April 2006
19:40

Reds (Australia)	20–24	(South Africa) Stormers

Lang Park, Brisbane
Attendance: 17,866

21 April 2006
19:40

Western Force (Australia)	23–23	(New Zealand) Crusaders

Subiaco Oval, Perth
Attendance: 30,231

22 April 2006
19:40

Brumbies (Australia)	21–16	(New Zealand) Hurricanes

Canberra Stadium, Canberra
Attendance: 17,122

22 April 2006
15:00

Sharks (South Africa)	32–15	(New Zealand) Blues

Kings Park Stadium, Durban
Attendance: 26,780

22 April 2006
17:00

Bulls (South Africa)	46–17	(South Africa) Cats

Loftus Versfeld Stadium, Pretoria
Attendance: 33,836

=== Round 12 ===
28 April 2006
19:35

Highlanders (New Zealand)	3–20	(Australia) Waratahs

Carisbrook, Dunedin
Attendance: 7,500

28 April 2006
19:10

Cats (South Africa)	34–34	(Australia) Western Force

Ellis Park Stadium, Johannesburg
Attendance: 11,263

29 April 2006
19:35

Hurricanes (New Zealand)	35–10	(New Zealand) Chiefs

Wellington Regional Stadium, Wellington
Attendance: 27,211

29 April 2006
19:40

Brumbies (Australia)	36–0	(Australia) Reds

Canberra Stadium, Canberra
Attendance: 17,041

29 April 2006
15:00

Cheetahs (South Africa)	33–34	(New Zealand) Blues

Free State Stadium, Bloemfontein
Attendance: 8,000

29 April 2006
17:00

Bulls (South Africa)	34–27	(South Africa) Sharks

Loftus Versfeld Stadium, Pretoria
Attendance: 45,000

29 April 2006
19:10

Stormers (South Africa)	28–17	(New Zealand) Crusaders

Newlands Stadium, Cape Town
Attendance: 30,000

=== Round 13 ===
5 May 2006
19:35

Hurricanes (New Zealand)	26–22	(Australia) Reds

Wellington Regional Stadium, Wellington
Attendance: 21,367

5 May 2006
19:10

Bulls (South Africa)	17–35	(New Zealand) Crusaders

Loftus Versfeld Stadium, Pretoria
Attendance: 41,968

6 May 2006
19:35

Chiefs (New Zealand)	37–33	(Australia) Waratahs

Waikato Stadium, Hamilton
Attendance: 13,000

6 May 2006
19:40

Brumbies (Australia)	26–28	(New Zealand) Highlanders

Canberra Stadium, Canberra
Attendance: 19,023

6 May 2006
15:00

Cheetahs (South Africa)	14–16	(Australia) Western Force

Griqua Park, Kimberley
Attendance: 8,500

6 May 2006
17:00

Sharks (South Africa)	24–17	(South Africa) Stormers

Kings Park Stadium, Durban
Attendance: 31,296

6 May 2006
19:10

Cats (South Africa)	34–33	(New Zealand) Blues

Ellis Park Stadium, Johannesburg
Attendance: 13,000

=== Round 14 ===
12 May 2006
19:35

Crusaders (New Zealand)	33–3	(Australia) Brumbies

Lancaster Park, Christchurch
Attendance: 31,000

12 May 2006
19:40

Reds (Australia)	22–16	(New Zealand) Highlanders

Willows Sports Complex, Townsville
Attendance: 10,580

12 May 2006
19:10

Sharks (South Africa)	41–25	(Australia) Western Force

Kings Park Stadium, Durban
Attendance: 26,947

13 May 2006
19:35

Blues (New Zealand)	9–30	(New Zealand) Chiefs

Eden Park, Auckland
Attendance: 30,000

13 May 2006
19:40

Waratahs (Australia)	14–19	(New Zealand) Hurricanes

Sydney Football Stadium, Sydney
Attendance: 37,042

13 May 2006
15:00

Cheetahs (South Africa)	28–23	(South Africa) Cats

Free State Stadium, Bloemfontein
Attendance: 7,000

13 May 2006
17:00

Stormers (South Africa)	10–43	(South Africa) Bulls

Newlands Stadium, Cape Town
Attendance: 49,000

== Finals ==
=== Semi finals ===
19 May 2006
19:35

Hurricanes (New Zealand)	16–14	(Australia) NSW Waratahs

Wellington Regional Stadium, Wellington
Attendance: 34,500

20 May 2006
19:35

Crusaders (New Zealand)	35–15	(South Africa) Bulls

Lancaster Park, Christchurch
Attendance: 24,000

=== Grand final ===
27 May 2006
19:35

Crusaders (New Zealand)	19–12	(New Zealand) Hurricanes
Try: Laulala 62'; Con: Carter 63'; Pen: Carter (4) 32', 37', 46', 69'		Pen: Weepu 14'; Holwell 44'; Gopperth (2) 56', 70'

Lancaster Park, Christchurch
Attendance: 36,500
Referee: Jonathan Kaplan (South Africa)

FB	15	Leon MacDonald
RW	14	Rico Gear
OC	13	Casey Laulala
IC	12	Aaron Mauger
LW	11	Scott Hamilton
FH	10	Dan Carter
SH	9	Kevin Senio
N8	8	Mose Tuiali'i
OF	7	Richie McCaw (c)
BF	6	Reuben Thorne
RL	5	Ross Filipo
LL	4	Chris Jack
TP	3	Greg Somerville
HK	2	Corey Flynn
LP	1	Wyatt Crockett
Substitutes:
HK	16	Tone Kopelani
PR	17	Campbell Johnstone
FL	18	Johnny Leo'o
FL	19	Tanerau Latimer
FH	20	Stephen Brett
CE	21	Cameron McIntyre
WG	22	Caleb Ralph
Coach:
(New Zealand) Robbie Deans

FB	15	Isaia Toeava
RW	14	Lome Fa'atau
OC	13	Ma'a Nonu
IC	12	Tana Umaga
LW	11	Shannon Paku
FH	10	David Holwell
SH	9	Piri Weepu
N8	8	Rodney So'oialo (c)
OF	7	Chris Masoe
BF	6	Jerry Collins
RL	5	Jason Eaton
LL	4	Paul Tito
TP	3	Neemia Tialata
HK	2	Andrew Hore
LP	1	John Schwalger
Substitutions:
HK	16	Luke Mahoney
PR	17	Joe McDonnell
LK	18	Luke Andrews
N8	19	Thomas Waldrom
SH	20	Brendan Haami
FH	21	Jimmy Gopperth
CE	22	Tamati Ellison
Coach:
(New Zealand) Colin Cooper

== Player statistics ==
=== Leading try scorers ===
Top 3 try scorers
Pos	Name	Tries	Pld	Team
1	Lome Fa'atau	10	14	Hurricanes
2	Stirling Mortlock	9	13	Brumbies
3	Scott Staniforth	9	13	Western Force

=== Leading point scorers ===
Top 3 overall point scorers
Pos	Name	Points	Pld	Team
1	Dan Carter	221	14	Crusaders
2	Peter Hewat	191	14	Waratahs
3	Stephen Donald	133	13	Chiefs
