= Peter Grant (rugby union) =

South Africa international rugby union player

- Full name: Peter John Grant
- Born: 15 August 1984 (age 42) Durban, South Africa
- Height: 1.86 m (6 ft 1 in)
- Weight: 92 kg (14 st 7 lb; 203 lb)
- School: Maritzburg College
- University: Stellenbosch University

Rugby union career
- Position: Fly-Half
- Current team: Force
Youth career
- 2002: Sharks
- 2003–2004: Western Province
Senior career
Years	Team	Apps	(Points)
2004–2009	Western Province	56	(285)
2006–2014	Stormers	104	(866)
2010–2014	Kobelco Steelers	35	(342)
2014–2015	La Rochelle	22	(83)
2016–2017	Force	20	(93)
2017–2018	Perth Spirit	6	(35)
- Correct as of 6 June 2018
International career
Years	Team	Apps	(Points)
2002	South Africa Schools		
2003	S.A. Under–19		
2007	Barbarians	1	(0)
2007	Emerging Springboks	3	(44)
2007–2008	South Africa	5	(0)
- Correct as of 6 June 2018

Peter John Grant (born 15 August 1984 in Durban) is a South African rugby player.

He was educated at Maritzburg College in Pietermaritzburg where he matriculated in 2002. He played at fly-half for the Western Force in Super Rugby and since 2010, for the Kobe Kobelco Steelers in Japan's Top League.

He also played 5 tests for the Springboks team.

== Super Rugby Statistics ==
As of 25 July 2016

Season	Team	Games	Starts	Sub	Mins	Tries	Cons	Pens	Drops	Points	Yel	Red
2006	Stormers	11	9	2	706	1	14	23	0	102	0	0
2007	Stormers	11	11	0	854	2	18	22	0	112	0	0
2008	Stormers	13	12	1	951	2	22	21	0	117	0	0
2009	Stormers	13	11	2	967	2	12	9	0	61	0	0
2010	Stormers	14	14	0	1102	1	20	32	0	141	0	0
2011	Stormers	10	9	1	737	0	14	38	0	142	0	0
2012	Stormers	16	15	1	1205	2	16	34	0	144	0	0
2013	Stormers	2	0	2	47	0	0	0	0	0	0	0
2014	Stormers	14	7	7	704	0	10	9	0	47	0	0
2016	Force	12	6	6	537	0	8	14	0	58	0	0
Total		116	94	22	7810	10	134	202	0	924	0	0
