= Sam Norton-Knight =

Australian rugby union player (born 1983)

- Born: Samuel Hamish Norton-Knight; 2 December 1983 (age 42) Canberra, ACT, Australia
- Height: 1.88 m (6 ft 2 in)
- Weight: 86 kg (13 st 8 lb)
- School: All Saints Anglican School

Rugby union career
- Position: Fly-Half / Centre / Full-Back
Senior career
Years	Team	Apps	(Points)
2007	Central Coast Rays	10	(35)
2009/2010	Cardiff Blues	19	(18)
2010–2012	Panasonic Wild Knights	23	(10)
2013/2014	Kubota Spears	10	(10)
2015–2017	NEC Green Rockets	10	(5)
2017	Kurita Water Gush	0	(0)
- Correct as of 15 January 2017
Super Rugby
Years	Team	Apps	(Points)
2005	Brumbies	9	(10)
2006–2009	Waratahs	49	(40)
2013	Western Force	8	(5)
- Correct as of 10 June 2013
International career
Years	Team	Apps	(Points)
2007	Australia	2	(5)
- Correct as of 20 September 2012

Sam Norton-Knight (born 2 December 1983, in Canberra) is an Australian international rugby union footballer. He was born in Canberra but was educated on the Gold Coast.

Norton-Knight was selected in the under-19 ACT team and subsequently made his provincial debut for the Brumbies against a Fijian side in 2003. He went on to make his Super 12 debut during the 2005 season against the Crusaders. He received a call up to the Australia A squad later that year.

He then signed with the New South Wales Waratahs and made his provincial debut for them in a tour match against a Czech Republic side in Prague, scoring a try on debut for the NSW team. He played in two other matches that tour, against Romanian and Russian teams. He has since been capped 8 times for the Waratahs in Super rugby matches, and following the 2007 Super 14 season, he was called up into the Australian squad.

In March 2009 it was announced he had signed for the Cardiff Blues. After only one season in Wales, it was announced in June 2010 that he had joined the Sanyo Wild Knights in Japan.
