= Kawau (disambiguation) =

Kawau is an island off New Zealand.

Kawau or Te Kawau may also refer to:

- Kawau, the Māori name for the great cormorant
- Te Kawau, a New Zealand rugby club
- Jason Kawau (born 1981), a New Zealand rugby player
- Apihai Te Kawau (died 1869), a paramount chief of the Ngāti Whātua Māori tribe

== See also ==
- Kawaue, Gifu, Japan
