= Serge Lilo =

- Born: 3 April 1985 (age 41) Wellington, New Zealand
- Height: 1.83 m (6 ft 0 in)
- Weight: 98 kg (216 lb)
- School: Aotea College

Rugby union career
- Position: Flanker
Amateur team(s)
Years	Team	Apps	(Points)
- Northern United
Provincial / State sides
Years	Team	Apps	(Points)
2005–2012	Wellington	45	(5)
- Correct as of 24 December 2009
Super Rugby
Years	Team	Apps	(Points)
2006–07	Hurricanes	11	(10)
2009	Chiefs	13	(5)
2010	Blues	11	(5)
2011–2012	Hurricanes	7	(5)
- Correct as of 17 October 2012
- Correct as of 24 December 2009

Serge Lilo (born 3 April 1985) is a New Zealand rugby union player who represented the Wellington Lions in the Air New Zealand Cup (now known as the Mitre 10 Cup) and the Hurricanes in Super Rugby.

== Career ==
=== Representative Rugby ===
Lilo was a member of the New Zealand under 19 team that won the 2004 IRB Under 19 Rugby World Championship in South Africa.

=== Provincial Rugby ===
Lilo made his debut for the Wellington Lions in 2005 against Auckland. Lilo's 2007 season was cut short when he sustained a serious knee injury early in Wellington's Air New Zealand Cup 45-3 quarter-final victory over the Southland Stags. The injury forced Lilo to miss the 2008 Super 14 season and he didn't return to rugby until May 2008.

Lilo scored his first points for the Wellington Lions when he crossed the line for a try in the 2008 Air New Zealand Cup 4th round clash with the Counties Manukau Steelers.

=== Super Rugby ===
Lilo was called into the Hurricanes squad in 2006 to replace Ben Herring who had sustained a knee injury before the season had begun. Lilo made his one and only appearance of the season off the bench in the 23-19 victory over the Stormers at Newlands Stadium in Cape Town.

Lilo's 2007 Super 14 season was more fruitful as he appeared in ten games for the Hurricanes including five starts. Lilo scored his first try in Super Rugby against the Chiefs, a game the Hurricanes went on to win 39-32.

Lilo missed the 2008 Super 14 season through injury but was selected for the Chiefs as a draft player in 2009. Lilo was picked up via the draft once more for the 2010 season, this time by the Blues. In May 2010 The Australian reported Lilo was in negotiations to sign with the Melbourne Rebels for start of the 2011 season.
