= Isobel Thomson =

New Zealand women's hockey international

Personal information
- Full name: Isobel Rowena Thomson
- Born: 18 September 1954 (age 71) Ranfurly, New Zealand

Sport
- Sport: Field hockey
Senior career
Years	Team	Caps	Goals
–	Woolston	-	-
National team
Years	Team	Caps	Goals
1983–1986	New Zealand		-

Isobel Rowena Thomson (born 18 September 1954) is a former New Zealand women's field hockey international. She represented New Zealand at the 1983 and 1986 Women's Hockey World Cups and the 1984 Summer Olympics.

== Early years and family ==
Thomson is daughter of Chap and Donella Hore. She was one of four children and was raised on the family farm in Maniototo. She is the aunt of Charlie Hore and Andrew Hore, who both played rugby union for Otago. Andrew Hore was also a former New Zealand rugby union international.

== Playing career ==
=== Clubs ===
Thomson played for Woolston Hockey Club, based in Woolston, Christchurch.

=== New Zealand ===
Tournaments	Place
1983 Women's Hockey World Cup	7th
1984 Summer Olympics	6th
1986 Women's Hockey World Cup	4th
