= Lucky Mulipola =

Samoa international rugby union player

- Born: Ioakimo Mulipola; 28 May 1983 (age 43) Motoʻotua, Samoa
- Height: 1.82 m (6 ft 0 in)
- Weight: 94 kg (14 st 11 lb)

Rugby union career
- Position: Wing
Senior career
Years	Team	Apps	(Points)
2003-05	Nelson Bays	31	(97)
2006-11	Tasman	13	(10)
2008-2009	Otago	9	(15)
2007-2009	Highlanders	13	(15)
International career
Years	Team	Apps	(Points)
2009-	Samoa	2	

Ioakimo "Lucky" Mulipola (born 28 May 1983) is a Samoan rugby union player. He is a winger who plays his rugby in New Zealand. Mulipola made his provincial debut in 2003 for Nelson Bays, and his international debut for Samoa in 2009.

== Education ==
Mulipola attended Nelson College in 2002, and was the school's senior athletics champion that year.

== Career ==
=== Nelson Bays ===
In 2003 Mulipola was introduced to NPC level rugby when he debuted for Nelson Bays against Manawatu. In three seasons playing for the union, he scored 97 points.

=== Tasman ===
Following the amalgamation of the Nelson Bays and Marlborough rugby unions in 2006, Mulipola played for the newly formed Tasman Makos in the Air New Zealand Cup. In nine appearances in 2006, he scored two tries.

Mulipola returned to the Makos, on loan from Otago, in September 2009.

=== Highlanders ===
Mulipola played for the Highlanders franchise from 2007 to 2009.

In his debut season for the Highlanders, as a draft player, Mulipola scored two tries. His best performance for the side was against the Waikato Chiefs in Queenstown when he stood up Roy Kinikinilau and then outpaced him to the corner, then minutes later he outjumped the former Highlander and sent Anton Oliver in for a five-pointer.

In 2008, Mulipola broke his arm in the first match of the Super 14 season against the Queensland Reds, and was ruled out of the remainder of the competition.

In 2009, he made only one appearance from the bench for the Highlanders.

=== Otago ===
Mulipola was signed by Otago in 2007, but missed the NPC competition that year after shoulder surgery. In September 2009, while still on contract to Otago, Mulipola was loaned out to Tasman for the remainder of the 2009 Air New Zealand Cup, having not made an appearance for Otago all season.

In nine appearances for Otago, Mulipola scored three tries.

=== Samoa ===
Mulipola played two test matches for Samoa in 2009. He made his debut against France on 21 November 2009, playing the full 80 minutes.
