= Roy Kinikinilau =

Tongan rugby union player

- Born: 14 February 1980 (age 46) Tonga
- Height: 193 cm (6 ft 4 in)
- Weight: 103 kg (16 st 3 lb)
- Notable relative: Paula Kinikinilau (brother)

Rugby union career
- Position: Wing
Senior career
| Years | Team | Apps | (Points) |
| 2007-2015 | Ricoh Black Rams | | |
Provincial / State sides
| Years | Team | Apps | (Points) |
| 2002-2005 | Wellington | | |
| 2006-2007 | Waikato | 23 | (40) |
Super Rugby
| Years | Team | Apps | (Points) |
| 2004 | Hurricanes | 9 | (25) |
| 2006 | Highlanders | 13 | (25) |
| 2007 | Chiefs | 12 | (20) |
National sevens team
| Years | Team | | Comps |
| 2002-2007 | New Zealand | | |

Roy Kinikinilau (born 14 February 1980) is a former rugby union player who most recently played for the Ricoh Black Rams in the Top League in Japan. A powerful winger, Kinkinilau is also an accomplished rugby sevens player. Born in Tonga, he represented New Zealand internationally in rugby sevens competitions.

== Playing career ==
=== Provincial Rugby ===
Kinkinilau was born in Tonga but came to New Zealand at age 6. He made his provincial debut for Wellington in 2002 at number eight but due to his pace and athleticism was converted to a wing the following season.

Kinkinilau spent four seasons at Wellington before transferring to Waikato for the 2006 Air New Zealand Cup. Although he helped Waikato to a championship-winning campaign, he didn't play in the finals against his old team, Wellington.

Following the 2007 Air New Zealand Cup, he signed in Japan.

=== Super Rugby ===
Kinikinilau scored tries during his time in the Super Rugby competition but did not maintain a permanent position in a team lineup.

He made his debut for the Hurricanes in the 2004 Super 12 season, and impressively scored 5 tries in only 9 appearances. However, he was not included in the side for the 2005 season.

For 2006, Kinikinilau was drafted to the Highlanders. He started the season with a bang, with 4 tries from his first 4 starts, but came off the boil as the season went along, ending the year on the substitute's bench. He did, however, lead the side with 5 tries.

Kinikinilau was on the move again for the 2007 Super 14 season, this time drafted to the Chiefs. He started 12 of the team's 13 games and scored another four tries.

=== Japan ===
Kinikinilau left New Zealand in 2007 to sign in Japan with the Ricoh Black Rams. He has remained with the team through 2010-11, where he scored 5 tries in 9 appearances before retiring in 2015.

=== Rugby Sevens ===
Kinikinilau was a dynamic rugby sevens player who exploded onto the international scene in style, scoring 37 tries in 7 competitions in 2002 and 2003. He continued as an elite sevens player through 2007, when he helped New Zealand win the 2006-07 IRB Sevens World Series.

Since retiring from rugby, Kinikinlau runs and operates a cleaning business in Perth, Western Australia, Kinikleen.
