= Southern Spears =

- Union: South African Rugby Union
- Founded: 2005
- Location: Port Elizabeth, South Africa
- Region: Eastern Cape Province, Overberg, Central Karoo and Garden Route
- Ground(s): EPRU Stadium (Capacity: 33,852)

The Southern Spears were a South African rugby union franchise who were founded in 2005 and were intended to participate in Super 14 from 2007 onwards; however, their proposed entry into the competition led to considerable controversy within the country's rugby establishment. In April 2006, after concerns over the franchise's financial stability and sporting competitiveness, the Spears were denied entry into the Super 14. Following this, the Southern Spears effectively ceased to exist. In June 2009, the Southern Kings, a Port Elizabeth based Super Rugby team, was established and is not connected with the former outfit.

== Squad ==
The Southern Spears originally had a core squad of 22 players, and are widely recognised as The People's Team throughout the Eastern Cape and are drawn from, 6 players from Border, 4 from SWD and 12 from Eastern Province. Of the squad of 22, three were in the Springbok under-21 squad that took part in the under-21 World Championship. These were the Captain Ashley Johnson – No.8, Warren Malgas at No.9 and Isma-eel Dollie at flyhalf.

Following the High Court Ruling in mid-August, some have called into question how strong the Spears franchise would actually be in the 2006 Super 14 season. When the Spears future was cast into doubt, a lot of players were forced to join alternative clubs. Johnson signed with the Cheetahs, Dollie with the Western Province and Ashton Constant with the Pumas. In the three Unions that the Spears draw from, none are currently in the Premier Division of the Currie Cup.

== Location ==
The Spears were intended to draw players from the following unions that participate in South Africa's main domestic competition, the Currie Cup:

- Border Bulldogs, representing the eastern half of Eastern Cape Province
- SWD Eagles, representing the portion of Western Cape Province east of the Cape Town metropolis; more precisely the Overberg, Central Karoo and Garden Route districts of that province
- Mighty Elephants, representing the western half of Eastern Cape

It was intended that the Spears would play at EPRU Stadium in Port Elizabeth, the city where the franchise was headquartered.

== Kit ==
The Spears jersey is predominantly red, with black being the second primary colour of the kit.

== History ==
=== Bid for Super 14 entry ===
This franchise was at the centre of months of infighting between South Africa's Minister of Sport, the country's Super 14 franchise committees, and the South African Rugby Union (SARU). Due to the expansion of the Super 12 to the Super 14, to take place in 2006, South Africa was entitled to add a fifth franchise to its existing four. However, six groups—the four existing franchises, a group representing Free State and Northern Cape, and a group representing the "Southern and Eastern Cape" (SEC) region—submitted proposals for franchises. Since it was generally conceded that the existing franchises would continue in the Super 14, the conflict focused on the other two groups.

Eventually, the Free State-Northern Cape group was admitted into the 2006 Super 14 season as the Cheetahs. However, the SEC group was guaranteed a place in the Super 14 in 2007 and 2008. To accommodate them, a promotion/relegation system was instituted. In 2006, the original plan called for the bottom-placed South African Super 14 team to be relegated, with the Spears taking their place. In 2007, the bottom-placed South African team, apart from the Spears, would play a test match with the relegated team from 2006 to determine the fifth South Africa team to play in the 2008 Super 14. Starting with the end of the 2008 season, the Spears would have then been subject to possible relegation via this system.

On 8 June 2005, the SA Rugby President's Council signed a binding legal agreement granting the Spears rights in which SA Rugby obligated themselves to financially support them until December 2006, procure sponsors, play in the 2006 Currie Cup and entrenchment in the 2007 and 2008 Super 14 series. This same decision/agreement was then ratified by the SA Rugby Board at a meeting on 2 December 2005, and all these competition fixtures were included in a definitive Franchise Participation agreement, which the Spears signed on 7 February 2006.

=== Currie Cup and Super 14 ===
In 2006, the Spears were to field a side in the Premier Division of the Currie Cup to allow them to build a team for their 2007 Super 14 debut. There was considerable opposition to the Spears automatically joining Super 14 in 2007 from the existing 5 Super 14 teams. The existing teams wanted the Spears to play the lowest ranked South African based team for the spot in the next year's league. One major blow to the Spears' hopes of automatically entering the Super 14 came at the 2006 General Meeting of the SARU when Brian van Rooyen, the controversial president who strongly pushed for the Spears' inclusion in Super 14, was voted out of office. His successor, Oregan Hoskins, ran on a platform that included scrapping, or at least radically modifying, the promotion/relegation system introduced by van Rooyen.

A budget of R12m was made available by SARU for the Spears to campaign in 2006, pre the 2007 Super Rugby Tournament in which they were entrenched for the Super Rugby Tournament in 2007 and 2008. It is this entrenchment that would have left one or at the most 2 of the existing Super Rugby sides without any competition or tournaments to play and would have led to complications with player and sponsorship agreements. As a consequence the 5 CEO's of the Bulls, Cheetahs, Lions, Sharks and Stormers collaborated in an "all-for-one and one-for-all" to out vote the incumbent SARU President Brian van Rooyen and replace him with Oregan Hoskins a conveyancing attorney from Pietermaritzburg. It was Hoskins' brief to specifically shut down the Spears operation.

From January 2006 to May 2006 the Spears had to arrange their own tournaments and games and did this themselves by organising over 10 Matches, 5 "internationals" the others against 5 provincial sides (3 - Kenya, 2 - Namibia, Cheetahs, Lions, WP, Border and SWD).

The Spears were captained by Ashley Johnson, who led a team of 30 players accompanied by 5 management staff, who played games against WP, Lions, Cheetahs, Border and the Eagles in front of crowds up to 35,000 at Telkom Park in Mandela Bay and to capacity in East London's stadium of 15,000.

The 5 International games were organised by the Spears, as the Lions had to do in 2013, when they sat out a season in favour of the Southern Kings, as SA Rugby failed to establish a tournament roster for either the Spears in 2006 or any one or two, of the Super Rugby franchises (Bulls, Cheetahs, Lions, Sharks and WP) who would have had to sit out for the 2007 and 2008 Super Rugby season. This would have been economically fatal for the franchises.

The Spears games were played against Kenya's National squad in a Tri-Game Series of 2 home in Mandela Bay and the Woolfson Stadium and one Away game in Nairobi at the Olympic stadium. Peter de Villiers the Head Coach felt it important to expose the Spears squad to international team travel and squad assembly in preparation for the Super 15 in 2007 & 2008. Two other games were played against Namibia in Windhoek

The Spears were told that they would not be included in the 2007 Super 14 over issues of competitiveness. All financial reporting in the Spears organization, was made by SA Rugby Pty Ltd who had all players and management as salaried employees of SA Rugby and made all financial disbursements. Total expenditure of the Spears in 2006 was R6m of the R12m budget. Shortly after the election of Hoskins in March 2006 as the new President of SA Rugby, declared that the Spears were "ill prepared to compete" and targeted the CEO Tony McKeever as the target of a campaign to marginalise him and was "suspended pending an investigation". This was widely seen as a further move by SA Rugby to strong arm the smaller shareholder unions to sideline McKeever in May 2006, who had been tenacious in his stance in ensuring that SA Rugby and its member unions not breach its 8 June 2005 agreement with the franchise. The alleged "suspension" by the Spears Board was declared as unlawful by the Grahamstown High Court and McKeever's attorneys, pointed out the gross irregularity and recklessness by the Spears board and McKeever's suspension was "lifted" by the Grahamstown High Court, barely a week of it being imposed

In addition, payments of salaries to Spears' personnel were unilaterally suspended by SA Rugby in June 2006. The Spears were also due to compete in the 2006 Currie Cup competition, but that was put in doubt due to the refusal by SA Rugby to continue financially supporting the Spears.

=== Legal battle ===
McKeever's legal counsel of Advocates Norman Arendse and Geoff Budlender, produced to the High Court, the Presidents Council resolution of 8 June 2005, plus supporting documents from SA Rugby confirming this agreement. These documents supported McKeever's contention that SA Rugby had abandoned the franchise and failed to adhere to the agreement signed and ratified by the SA Rugby Board on 2 December 2005, after which a further Franchise Participation Agreement was drawn up by SA Rugby for all 6 franchises including the Southern Spears, to sign before 10 February 2006.

On 21 July the Cape Town High Court heard the closing arguments from both the Spears and the SARU/SA Rugby (Pty) Ltd. Whilst the Spears argued that the SARU, and its commercial associate, SA Rugby were legally bound to include the Spears in competition, the counsel for the SARU argued that there was no legally binding contract between the two parties.

Following 5 Cape High Court orders in favour of the Spears over SA Rugby, on 4 August 2006, a High Court of South Africa ruling by Judge Dennis Davis, ruled with a cost order against SA Rugby, that the Spears had a valid and binding contract with SANZAR and SARU to compete in the Super 14 and Currie Cup. However, due to SA Rugby summarily terminating all payments to the Spears, it compounded the organisation's financial and administrative troubles and in November 2006 a settlement was reached that SA Rugby pay all legal costs. The Spears abandoned their legal case, and initially planned to continue to exist without competing in the Super 14. In spite of this hope, the organisation soon ceased to exist.

=== New Port Elizabeth side ===
In January 2009, the SARU announced that a new franchise in the South Eastern Cape region would be launched in June of that year to coincide with the arrival of the British and Irish Lions in Port Elizabeth for one of their midweek tour matches. The SEC franchise is to be launched with the goal of a future place in Super Rugby, but no timetable for its inclusion has been set. The Deputy President of the SARU Mark Alexander said "There is a desperate hunger for top-flight rugby in the South Eastern Cape and this is the first step to satisfying it", said Mr Watson. "There is much work to be done but the region has the resources and the capacity to deliver." He confirmed that the new franchise would not be known as the Southern Spears.

== Overview ==
Following intense debates and an impasse, in April and May 2005, on the awarding of a Fifth South African Super 14 Rugby Franchise, the SA Rugby Presidents Council, on 8 June 2005, took a decision and issued a resolution, borne out of necessity, to strategically reposition South African rugby for the future and fast track rugby development and transformation, in the smaller and bigger unions respectively. The smaller unions require financial resources to fast track development, as they already have moved beyond transformation, whereas the bigger more financially powerful unions needed to fast track transformation, instead of "engaging" players from the smaller unions.
