= Gareth Hardy =

Australian rugby player (born 1980)

- Born: 9 December 1980 (age 45) Sydney, Australia
- Height: 6 ft 1 in (185 cm)
- Weight: 249 lb (113 kg)
- School: St Joseph's College

Rugby union career
- Position: Prop
Senior career
Years	Team	Apps	(Points)
2009–11	Leeds Tykes	39	(5)
Super Rugby
Years	Team	Apps	(Points)
2004–05	Waratahs	16	(5)
2006–09	Western Force	29	(15)
International career
Years	Team	Apps	(Points)
2007	Australia A	2	(5)

Gareth Hardy (born 9 December 1980) is an Australian former professional rugby union player.

Born in Sydney, Hardy was educated at St Joseph's College and toured with the Australian Schools team in 1998/99.

Hardy, a loose-head prop, played for the New South Wales Waratahs, then was a foundation player with the Western Force for the 2006 Super 14 season. He represented Australia "A" at the 2007 IRB Pacific Nations Cup. In 2009, Hardy was signed by Leeds Tykes, where he played two seasons of Premiership Rugby.
