= Adam Wallace-Harrison =

Australian rugby player (born 1979)

- Born: Adam Wallace-Harrison; 24 September 1979 (age 47) Perth, Western Australia
- Height: 2.00 m (6 ft 6 1/2 in)
- Weight: 114 kg (17 st 13 lb)

Rugby union career
- Position: Lock
- Current team: Sunnybank
Senior career
Years	Team	Apps	(Points)
2007	Canberra Vikings	4	(0)
2010	NTT Communications Shining Arcs	13	(10)
Super Rugby
Years	Team	Apps	(Points)
2003–08	Brumbies	37	(15)
2011–13	Reds	30	(10)
- Correct as of 2 June 2013

Adam Wallace-Harrison (born 24 September 1979 in Perth, Western Australia) is a rugby union footballer who played professionally for the Queensland Reds in Super Rugby. His regular playing position was lock. He has previously played for the Brumbies and NTT Communications Shining Arcs.

He attended school at Wesley College in South Perth.
