= Charlie Fetoai =

New Zealand rugby union player

- Born: Charlie Fetoai; 11 January 1987 (age 39) Auckland, New Zealand
- Height: 179 cm (5 ft 10 in)
- Weight: 94 kg (14 st 11 lb)
- School: Brisbane State High School

Rugby union career
- Position: Centre
- Current team: Queensland Reds
Youth career
- -: Souths Acacia Ridge
- –: Souths
Provincial / State sides
Years	Team	Apps	(Points)
- Souths
Super Rugby
Years	Team	Apps	(Points)
2007 -	Queensland Reds	7	(5)
National sevens team
Years	Team		Comps
- Australia
- Rugby league career

Playing information
- Position: Centre
Club
Years	Team	Pld	T	G	FG	P
2006	Toowoomba Clydesdales
2006	Aspley Devils
2007	Brisbane Broncos
	Total	0	0	0	0	0

Charlie Fetoai (born 11 January 1987) is a rugby union player for the Queensland Reds in the Super Rugby competition.

Charlie Fetoai's position of choice is as a centre.

== Background ==
Fetoai was born in Auckland, New Zealand.

== Career ==
Fetoai won a gold medal with Australia's rugby sevens team at the Commonwealth Youth Games in December 2004.

He was contracted to the Brisbane Broncos in the NRL. He then moved from rugby league to rugby union, playing with the Queensland Reds in the Super Rugby competition.

Fetoai debuted with Queensland Reds as a substitute against the Hurricanes on 3 February 2007. His first start for the Reds came on 15 March 2008 against the Bulls at Suncorp Stadium. His career was cut short after breaking his neck while playing for Sunnybank. He cracked his C2 vertebra and sustained spinal bruising.

== Outside rugby ==
Fetoai founded a dance troupe called the Academy of Brothers, who went on to compete in Australia's Got Talent in 2013 where they came third. Academy of Brothers also competed at the 2013 World Hip Hop Championships where they placed fifth. He went on to found a dance academy in Moorooka.
