= Jason Kawau =

- Born: 5 February 1981 (age 45) Lumsden, New Zealand
- Height: 1.85 m (6 ft 1 in)
- Weight: 98 kg (216 lb)
- School: Otago Boys' High School
- University: Otago University

Rugby union career
- Position: Centre
Amateur team(s)
Years	Team	Apps	(Points)
2000–07	Otago University		
Senior career
Years	Team	Apps	(Points)
2010–12	Kobelco Steelers		
2012–14	Kurita Water		
Provincial / State sides
Years	Team	Apps	(Points)
2003–04	Otago	8	(5)
2005–09	Southland	54	(35)
Super Rugby
Years	Team	Apps	(Points)
2006–07	Highlanders	8	(15)
2009–10	Hurricanes	15	(0)
International career
Years	Team	Apps	(Points)
2006–08	New Zealand Māori	6	(15)

Jason Kawau (born 5 February 1981 in Lumsden, New Zealand) is a rugby union player currently playing for the Kobelco Steelers in the Top League in Japan.

== Playing career ==
Kawau made his provincial debut for Otago in 2003 but unfortunately due to a major knee injury in the lead up to the first game of the season he only made it back for the final 2 games of the 2003 season. In 2004 he made 6 appearances for Otago. Due to a lack of consistent game time Kawau transferred to Southland in 2005, where his career would blossom.

Kawau spent 5 seasons as a starter in the Stags' backfield, making his 50th appearance during the 2009 Air New Zealand Cup. His tenure with Southland would end on a high with the team's Ranfurly Shield triumph over Canterbury near the end of the 2009 season.

After impressing for Southland, Kawau was called into the Highlanders squad part-way through the 2006 Super 14 season as an injury replacement, and made two appearances. He was a full squad member the following season, and scored 3 tries in just 6 appearances. However, he was not included in the Highlanders squad for 2008.

Kawau returned to Super Rugby in 2009 when he was drafted to the Hurricanes and made 9 appearances, mainly as a substitute. He was back with the Hurricanes in 2010, but missed most of the season due to injury, only returning for 6 matches at the end of the year.

Kawau signed in Japan with the Kobelco Steelers for the 2010–11 season.
