= Charlie Hore =

New Zealand rugby union player

- Born: August 28, 1976 (age 50)
- Height: 1.85 m (6 ft 1 in)
- Weight: 96 kg (212 lb)
- Notable relative(s): Andrew Hore (brother); Isobel Thomson (aunt)

Rugby union career
- Position: Centre Fly-Half
Senior career
Years	Team	Apps	(Points)
- Banbridge
2004-2006	Borders		
2007-2008	US Dax		
2008-2010	Viadana		
Provincial / State sides
Years	Team	Apps	(Points)
- Otago
Super Rugby
Years	Team	Apps	(Points)
2006-2007	Highlanders		

Charlie Hore (born 28 August 1976) is a New Zealand rugby union player. His playing position was first five-eighth. He played for the Super 14 team Highlanders and played for Italian side Rugby Viadana. He also had a spell for Irish AIL Team Banbridge RFC in the late 1990s. He also played for Scottish side The Borders. He is the brother of former All Black Andrew Hore.
