= Andrew Hore =

New Zealand rugby union player (born 1978)

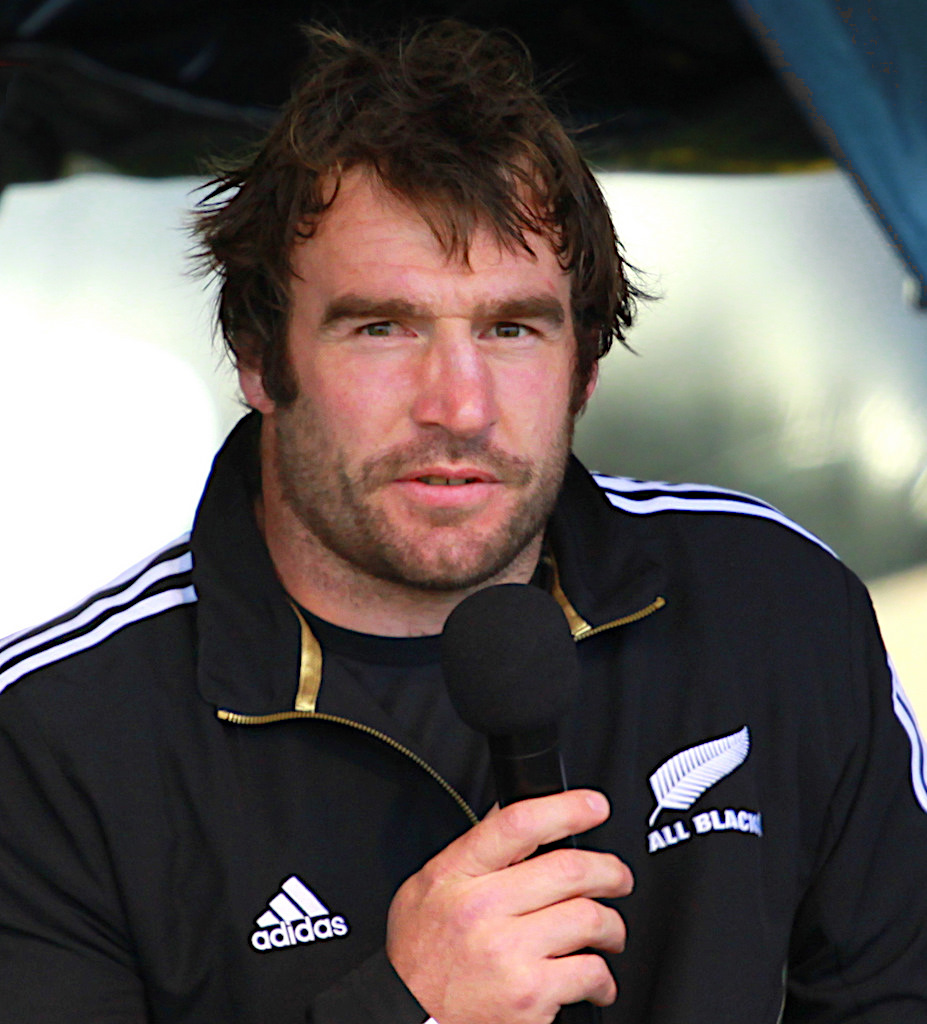
- Full name: Andrew Keith Hore
- Born: 13 September 1978 (age 48) Dunedin, New Zealand
- Height: 1.83 m (6 ft 0 in)
- Weight: 115 kg (18 st 2 lb; 254 lb)
- School: John McGlashan College
- Notable relatives: Charlie Hore (brother); Belinda Colling (sister-in-law); Isobel Thomson (aunt)
- Occupation: Sheep farmer

Rugby union career
- Position: Hooker
Senior career
| Years | Team | Apps | (Points) |
| 1998–2000 | Otago | 11 | (0) |
| 2001 | Crusaders | 6 | (0) |
| 2001–2012 | Taranaki | 63 | (75) |
| 2002–2011 | Hurricanes | 106 | (95) |
| 2012–2013 | Highlanders | 29 | (10) |
| 2014 | Southland | 1 | (0) |
| 2016 | Otago | 1 | (0) |
- Correct as of 5 May 2018
International career
| Years | Team | Apps | (Points) |
| 1999 | New Zealand Colts | 3 | (0) |
| 2002–2013 | New Zealand | 83 | (40) |
| 2005 | Junior All Blacks | 3 | (0) |
| 2015 | World XV | 1 | (0) |
- Correct as of 25 November 2017

Andrew Keith Hore (born 13 September 1978) is a former New Zealand rugby union player. He played for the All Blacks between 2002 and 2013. His position was hooker. He notably played for the Hurricanes in Super Rugby, but also represented the Highlanders and the Crusaders. When available, he played for Taranaki in the ITM Cup, now known as the Mitre 10 Cup. Hore retired from international rugby after playing Ireland during the 2013 All Black Northern Hemisphere tour, with a total of 83 test caps to his name. In 2008 Hore received the Kelvin Tremain Trophy for Rugby player of the year. In 2011, Andrew Hore captained the All Blacks against Canada.

== Rugby career ==
=== ITM/Mitre 10 Cup ===
Hore debuted for Otago in 1998, and in 2001 shifted to Taranaki; in 2014 Hore made his debut for Southland. In 2016 he made a comeback and helped Otago in the Mitre 10 Cup final.

=== Super Rugby ===
Hore made his Super Rugby debut for the Crusaders in 2001. In 2002 he shifted to the Hurricanes, with whom he made over 100 appearances. In 2011 he was controversially released from the Hurricanes by coach Mark Hammett and joined the Highlanders in 2012.

He was named Super Rugby Player of the Year and received the Kelvin Tremain New Zealand rugby player of the year in 2008.

=== International ===
Hore retired following the 2013 season. In 2011 he was selected for the All Blacks 2011 Rugby World Cup squad. In the final pool match of the tournament, he was selected to captain the side against Canada when both Richie McCaw and Dan Carter were injured and unable to play.

During the All Blacks end-of-year European Tour, controversy arose during the Wales versus New Zealand test match on 24 November 2012 after Hore tackled the Welsh lock Bradley Davies across the head off the ball. The offence - a red card one - was missed by the match referee, Hore faced the judiciary and received an end of season suspension. This incident resulted in Davies being taken off the field and taken to a hospital for further concussion assessment. He was suspended for 5 weeks following the incident.

Hore retired after the 2013 match against Ireland, in this match the All Blacks succeeded going an entire calendar year without being defeated, a feat which hasn't been managed since the dawn of the professional era. Although in 2014 he was selected by Dean Ryan to play in the Barbarians squad.

On returning to farming, Hore continued to play club-level rugby, serving as player–coach for the local Maniototo Maggots, later moving on to coach junior rugby for his son's team.

== Legal issues ==
In 2005, Hore was one of three men convicted and fined for shooting and killing a protected fur seal in New Zealand. Judge Rollo described the offending as a "grossly irresponsible, spontaneous act of hooliganism". Judge Rollo said he believed the aggravating features of the offending were the number of shots fired, the close proximity to the public and the fact that the area in which they were shooting was world-renowned for its wildlife.

In 2015 he was convicted of supplying firearms to an unlicensed person.

== Personal life ==
Hore was raised on Stonehenge Farm, which he now runs with his wife, a sheep station near Patearoa in the Maniototo region of central Otago which has been owned by his family since 1910, and returned to the farm to live and work full-time after he retired from international rugby. He considers farming central to his identity—so much so that when he first met his future wife Francine Hore (née Lister) while on a flight with the Hurricanes and she asked his occupation, he replied "I'm a farmer." Hore turned down several potentially lucrative overseas moves in order to stay close to the farm with his young family, and according to British journalist Tom Hamilton, "All of Andrew's money from rugby is in the farm, in the ground preparing it for [his son] Tyrell to one day take over."
