= Ross Filipo =

NZ international rugby union player

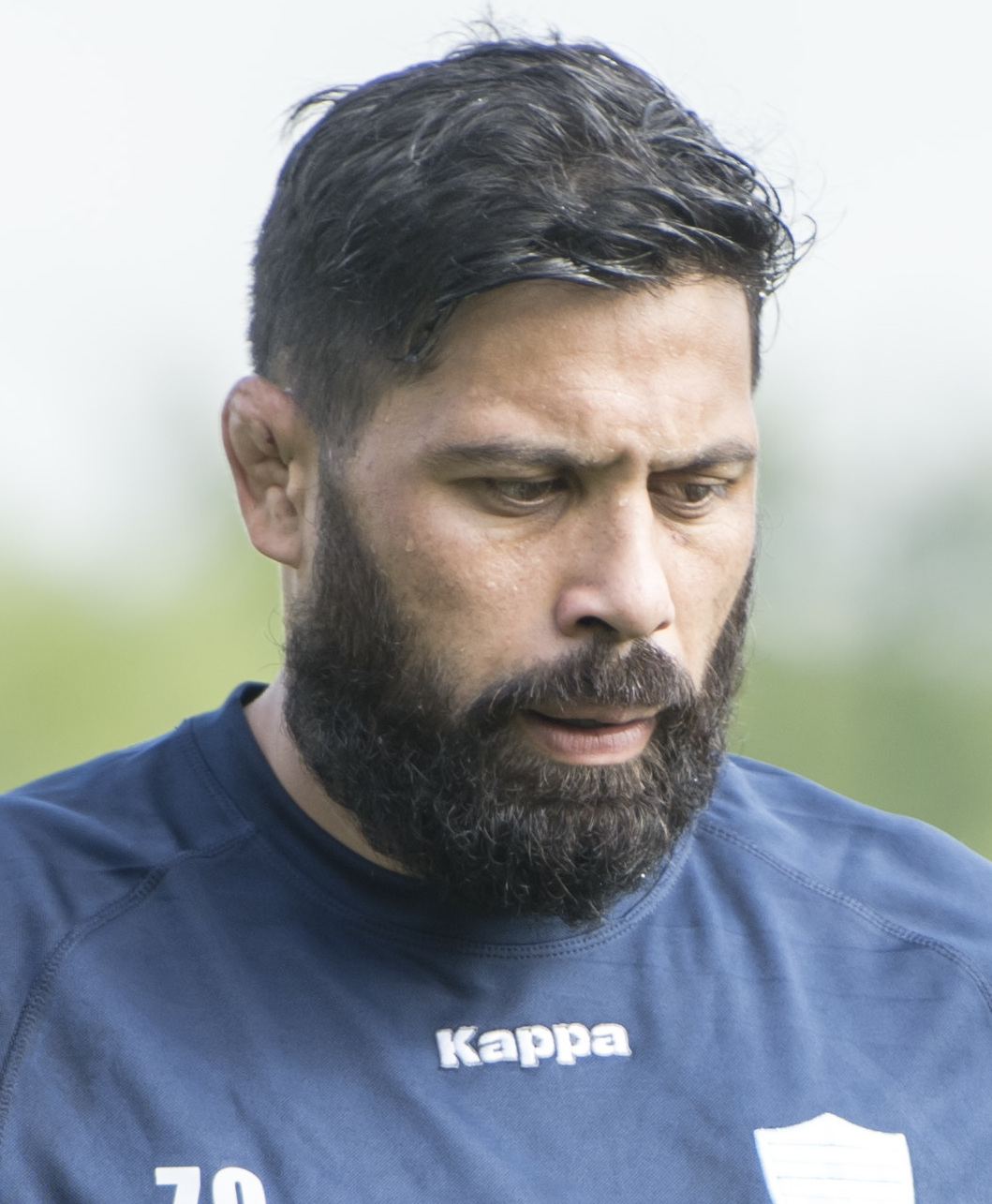
- Born: Ross Ami Filipo; 14 April 1979 (age 47) Lower Hutt, New Zealand
- Height: 1.96 m (6 ft 5 in)
- Weight: 118 kg (260 lb; 18 st 8 lb)
- School: Hutt Valley High School
- Notable relative(s): Wife- Louise Filipo Children- Cash Filipo, Kiana Filipo, Maia Filipo

Rugby union career
- Position: Lock / Flank / Number 8
Senior career
Years	Team	Apps	(Points)
2009–11	Bayonne	43	(20)
2011–12	Wasps RFC	17	(15)
2015−16	Racing 92	8	(0)
2017-18	Coca-Cola Red Sparks	2	(0)
- Correct as of 22 July 2016
Provincial / State sides
Years	Team	Apps	(Points)
2001	Marlborough	7	(0)
2003–08	Wellington	37	(35)
2012–14	Wellington	17	(45)
2016-17	Hawke's Bay	6	(0)
- Correct as of 16 October 2016
Super Rugby
Years	Team	Apps	(Points)
2004–09	Crusaders	45	(40)
2013–15	Chiefs	7	(0)
- Correct as of 21 June 2015
International career
Years	Team	Apps	(Points)
2005–08	Māori	5	(0)
2007	Junior All Blacks	3	(10)
2007–08	New Zealand	4	(0)
- Correct as of 8 November 2008
Coaching career
- Years: Team
- 2015: Hamilton Marist
- 2017–2018: Coca-Cola Red Sparks (assistant coach)
- 2019: Taupiri (assistant coach)
- 2020: Waikato (assistant coach)
- 2021–2025: Waikato
- 2024-2025: Māori All Blacks

Ross Ami Filipo (born 14 April 1979) is a retired New Zealand rugby union footballer. Filipo's career included long stints with Wellington in the Mitre 10 Cup, Crusaders in Super Rugby, and Bayonne in the Top 14 competition, and appearances for the All Blacks in 2007–2008.

== Career ==
=== New Zealand ===
Filipo first played provincial rugby for Marlborough in 2001. He then played for Wellington B in 2002, and made his debut for Wellington in 2003.

Although he had played for the Hurricanes development squad in 2003, he was not selected for the Hurricanes in 2004 and instead was drafted into the Crusaders for the 2004 Super 12. He then stayed with the Crusaders for the Super 12 and Super 14 until the 2009 season whilst playing for Wellington in the Air New Zealand Cup (formerly the National Provincial Championship) until 2008.

Filipo played for the New Zealand Māori in 2005 when they defeated the British and Irish Lions for the first time – he cites this as a career highlight. After the 2007 Super 14 season where Filipo scored six tries he was selected for the Junior All Blacks. After injuries to All Black locks Ali Williams and Keith Robinson, Filipo was called into the All Blacks squad. He debuted against Canada in June 2007.

Filipo was also selected for the All Blacks end of season Grand Slam tour at the end of 2008; he played against Scotland and Munster during this tour. He was also one of the regular guests on the Rugby Roundtable, which is a rugby union podcast based out of New Zealand.

=== Europe ===
In April 2009 it was announced that Filipo would be signing for Bayonne in the French Top 14 competition; he left for Bayonne at the conclusion of the 2009 Super 14 season.

On 11 April 2011 it was announced that Filipo would be signing for Wasps in the English Aviva Premiership

== Return to New Zealand ==
Filipo retired from professional rugby and returned to New Zealand in 2014, before being called up to play for the Chiefs in 2015. This reawakened his passion for playing and he turned out for Hamilton Marist as a player-coach, winning the Waikato Club Rugby title with them. This preceded a stint in France with Racing 92 in the Top 14 before returning to New Zealand with Hawkes Bay.

From there he turned to coaching properly, taking a role as assistant-coach with the Coca-Cola Red Sparks in the Top League in 2017, where he stayed for two years. He was asked to play as well.

2019 saw Filipo move to an assistant coach role with Taupiri as well as entering a Coach Educator role with Waikato Rugby. In 2020 Filipo assisted with coaching Waikato in the Mitre 10 Cup, working on defence and the forwards. Filipo was subsequently appointed as the head coach of the Waikato team for the 2021 Mitre 10 Cup season.

== Personal life ==
Filipo is a New Zealander of Māori and Samoan descent (Muaūpoko descent).
