= Jason Eaton =

New Zealand rugby union player

- Born: Jason John Eaton; 21 August 1982 (age 44) Palmerston North, New Zealand
- Height: 6 ft 8 in (2.03 m)
- Weight: 115 kg (18 st 2 lb)
- School: Palmerston North Boys' High School

Rugby union career
- Position: Lock
Amateur team(s)
Years	Team	Apps	(Points)
2020-	Old Boys University (premier reserve)	3	
Senior career
Years	Team	Apps	(Points)
2013–2014	NTT Communications Shining Arcs	4	(0)
2014–2018	La Rochelle	92	(30)
- Correct as of 3 Sep 2015
Provincial / State sides
Years	Team	Apps	(Points)
2002–03	Manawatu	25	(15)
2005–13	Taranaki	51	(35)
- Correct as of 6 November 2012
Super Rugby
Years	Team	Apps	(Points)
2006–13	Hurricanes	89	(50)
- Correct as of 31 May 2013
International career
Years	Team	Apps	(Points)
2005–09	New Zealand	15	(5)
- Correct as of 6 November 2012

Jason John Eaton (born 21 August 1982) is a former New Zealand rugby union player. He played as a lock.

== Early life ==
Although born in Palmerston North, Eaton grew up on a farm near the small community of Colyton.

He attended Feilding Intermediate and then Palmerston North Boys' High School.

== Career ==
Eaton made his provincial debut for Manawatu in 2002, before transferring to Taranaki in 2004.

He played for Stratford in the Taranaki premier competition.

He was picked out of obscurity by Graham Henry to tour with the All Blacks on their successful Grand Slam Tour of November 2005. At the time, Eaton had not played professional super series rugby. He made his All Black debut aged 23, versus Ireland on that tour.

Notably, Eaton played for the Hurricanes in Super Rugby where he scored 10 tries and played in 89 games. Eaton had an explosive start with the Hurricanes; scoring a pair of tries against the Western Force in his first match for the Hurricanes at Taranaki's home ground in New Plymouth.

Eaton played 15 test matches for the All Blacks between 2005 and 2009.

Eaton played 25 games for Manawatu in 2002–03, scoring three tries.

On 21 November 2006 Jason Eaton won the International Rugby Players' Association's (IRPA) international newcomer of the year award. This award is voted on by all international players, with players not allowed to vote for members of their own team.

Eaton was named Player of the Year in the 2011 Taranaki side. He left New Zealand in 2013 to briefly play with the Shining Arcs team in Japan before playing for French club La Rochelle from 2014 to 2018.
