= Mose Tuiali'i =

- Born: Moses Moses Tuiali’i; 25 March 1981 (age 45) Auckland, New Zealand
- Height: 1.94 m (6 ft 4 1/2 in)
- Weight: 112 kg (17 st 9 lb)
- School: Kelston Boys' High School

Rugby union career
- Position: Flanker / Number 8
Senior career
Years	Team	Apps	(Points)
2009–19	Yamaha Júbilo	125	(140)
Provincial / State sides
Years	Team	Apps	(Points)
2003	Northland	12	
2004	Auckland	6	
2005–08	Canterbury	31	
Super Rugby
Years	Team	Apps	(Points)
2003	Blues	3	(0)
2004–08	Crusaders	65	(65)
2013	Highlanders	9	(5)
International career
Years	Team	Apps	(Points)
2004–06	New Zealand	9	(5)
2007	Junior All Blacks	5	(10)
- Correct as of 8 February 2007

Moses Moses Tuiali'i (born 25 March 1981) is a former New Zealand rugby union player and a current schoolteacher. A Loose forward, Tuiali'i notably played for the Crusaders in Super Rugby between 2004 and 2008. He also played for the Blues in 2003 and later for the Highlanders in 2013. In between these years he moved to Japan and signed for Japanese club Yamaha Jubilo.

At a provincial level he has represented Northland, Auckland and Canterbury respectively.

Tuiali'i was first selected for the All Blacks in 2004 and played in 9 test matches until 2006.

After he retired from rugby in 2019, he went on to become a physical education teacher for Auckland Normal Intermediate, a role he still holds in 2026.
