= Campbell Johnstone =

New Zealand rugby union player

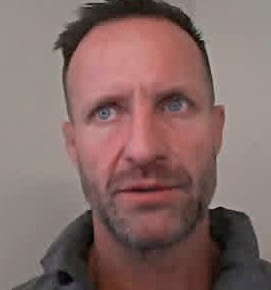
- Johnstone in 2023
- Born: Campbell Robert Johnstone; 7 January 1980 (age 46) Waipukurau, New Zealand
- Height: 1.83 m (6 ft 0 in)
- Weight: 110 kg (243 lb)
- School: Lindisfarne College
- University: Lincoln University

Rugby union career
- Position: Prop
Senior career
Years	Team	Apps	(Points)
2009–2012	Biarritz	105	(0)
2012	→ Ospreys	5	(0)
2013	Krasny Yar	9	(5)
2014	CSM București		
Provincial / State sides
Years	Team	Apps	(Points)
2002–2008	Canterbury	72	(35)
2012	Tasman	7	(5)
Super Rugby
Years	Team	Apps	(Points)
2004–2008	Crusaders	38	(10)
International career
Years	Team	Apps	(Points)
2005	New Zealand	3	(0)

Campbell Robert Johnstone (born 7 January 1980) is a former New Zealand international rugby union player. His position was prop. He played for provincial teams including Hawke's Bay in 2000, Canterbury in 2002, and Tasman in 2012. He played for the professional team the Crusaders in 2004. He played for representative teams New Zealand Colts in 2001, All Blacks in 2005, and Junior All Blacks in 2006. Johnstone played for Biarritz (France) from 2008 - 2012. He then played for the Ospreys from 2012 - 2013.

== Personal life ==
On 30 January 2023, Johnstone revealed in an interview with Hilary Barry on New Zealand television show Seven Sharp that he is gay, making him the first openly gay former All Black. Johnstone and his partner Ben Thomson privately married in October 2024 at Castle Hill Station, however had an open ceremony in January 2025 at The Flaxmill in Oxford, New Zealand.
