= Johnny Leo'o =

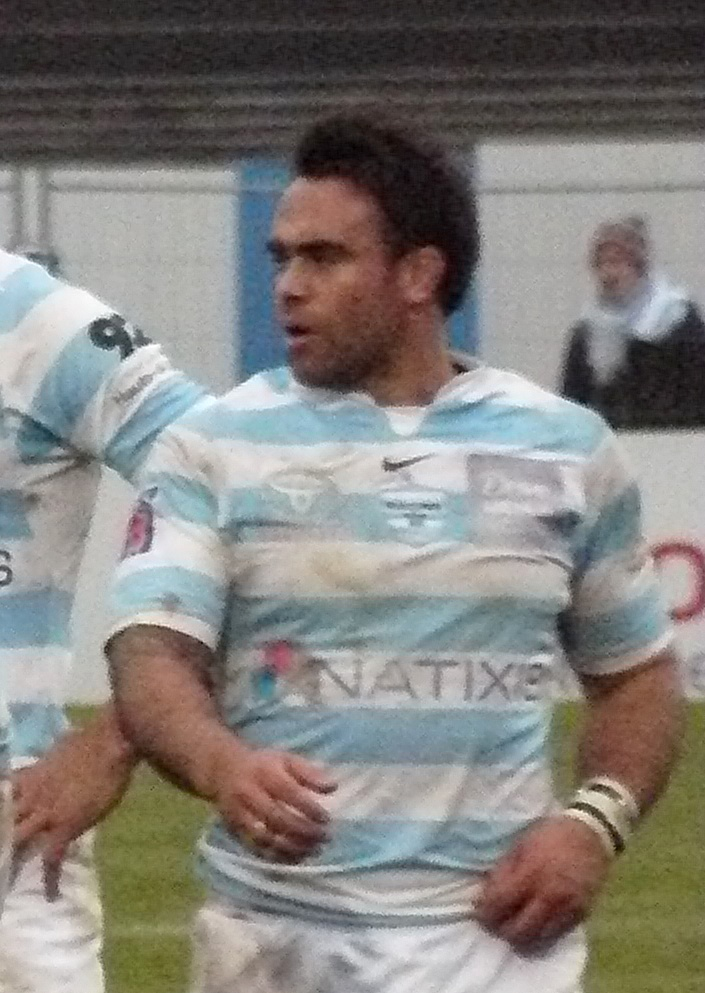
- Born: 3 October 1978 (age 48) Auckland, New Zealand
- Height: 1.85 m (6 ft 1 in)
- Weight: 100 kg (15 st 10 lb; 220 lb)

Rugby union career
- Position(s): Flanker, No. 8
Senior career
Years	Team	Apps	(Points)
- Racing Metro
Provincial / State sides
Years	Team	Apps	(Points)
? - 1998	Canterbury	60	
1999	Bay of Plenty	6	
Super Rugby
Years	Team	Apps	(Points)
2002–07	Crusaders	48	(30)
International career
Years	Team	Apps	(Points)
- Junior ABs
National sevens team
Years	Team		Comps
- New Zealand 7s

Johnny Leo'o (born 3 October 1978 in Auckland, New Zealand) is a New Zealand rugby union footballer. His usual position is at Flanker. He is 1.85m tall and weighs 100 kg. He played for Canterbury in the NPC and he also represented Crusaders in the Super 14 rugby competition. He played 60 games for Canterbury and 6 games for Bay of Plenty. He made his debut in 1999 for Bay of Plenty against Auckland. He made his Super Rugby debut for the Crusaders against the Stormers in the 2002 Super 12 season. He is part Samoan and for that reason the Samoa Rugby Football Union wanted him to play for Samoa but he declined and he went on to play for the New Zealand sevens team in 2000 and 2001 before being capped again at national level in 2006 when he made the Junior All Blacks. He played in over 40 matches for the Crusaders scoring 5 tries. He now plays his rugby for Racing Métro 92 in the Top 14 competition.

Johnny studied at Massey University through correspondence to be a Teacher. He graduated this degree in 2022.
