= Peter Hewat =

Australian rugby union player

- Born: Peter Hewat; 17 March 1978 (age 48) Inverell, New South Wales, Australia
- Height: 1.91 m (6 ft 3 in)
- Weight: 100 kg (15 st 10 lb)

Rugby union career
- Position: Fullback / Wing
Senior career
Years	Team	Apps	(Points)
2005–2007	NSW Waratahs	40	(520)
2007	Central Coast Rays	10	(121)
2007–2010	London Irish	78	(491)
2010–2013	Suntory Sungoliath	27	(132)
2012	ACT Brumbies	0	(0)
Coaching career
- Years: Team
- 2013–2017: Suntory Sungoliath (backs)
- 2017–2020: ACT Brumbies (attack & backs)
- 2020–2021: Black Rams Tokyo (attack & backs)
- 2021–2024: Black Rams Tokyo head coach
- 2024–: Leicester Tigers (attack & backs)

Peter Hewat (born 17 March 1978) is an Australian rugby union coach and former player, currently working as attack and backs coach at Leicester Tigers in England's Premiership Rugby. He has previously coached in Japan's Top League with Black Rams Tokyo and in Australia with the ACT Brumbies. In his playing career he played for the NSW Waratahs and Central Coast Rays in Australia, for London Irish in England's Premiership and Suntory Sungoliath in Japan.

== Youth ==
Originally from Inverell in north-west NSW, Hewat is a product of Brisbane's renowned Rugby nursery, Nudgee College. In spite of this, he did not play his first game until the age of 14. A natural athlete, within a year he was playing in the first XV alongside former Queensland Red Elton Flatley. Hewat also showed great potential as a junior cricketer ultimately representing Australia at the schoolboy level. Hewat then had a short yet successful stint in the Brisbane 1st grade club competition before he began to concentrate on rugby more seriously. In 2003, Hewat represented the Potoroo's 7 A Side Rugby Team where he won player of the tournament at the prestigious Darwin Hottest Sevens. He moved on to Australian U21 duties in 1998, before representing Australia at Sevens from 2001 to 2003.

== Waratahs ==
2005 can only be described as a watershed year in the career of Hewat. Three weeks' shy of his 27th birthday he made his Waratahs debut in round one of 2005 Super 12 against Chiefs, with his breakout match coming in round three scoring 20 points against the Cats. The leading Super 12 point scorer in his debut year, his 10 tries broke Scott Staniforth's Waratah record for tries in a season. He also smashed Matthew Burke's NSW record for points in a season, finishing with 243 points from 17 games during 2005. Almost unbelievably, Hewat came into 2005 with just two state caps and five points to his name. He missed just one match for the season, when he was rested from the Waratahs clash with the Romanian Barbarians on the Gulf Air development tour of Eastern Europe. On top of this, Hewat played two games for Australia A and captained Manly to within one win of the Tooheys New Cup Grand Final.

In the 2006 game against the Blues in round seven of the Super 14, Hewat moved on to second on the all-time pointscorers list for the Waratahs, his 28-point haul in the match seeing him move on to 359 points to surpass Marty Roebuck who held the spot with 337 points. Only Matt Burke (1147) has scored more points for New South Wales. In the same match, he also equalled Burke's record for scoring 100 season points in seven Super matches. In round eight against the Cheetahs, Hewat's 27 point haul saw him surpass 300 Super points. Two rounds later, against the Brumbies, Hewat surpassed the 400 point mark for NSW.mmHewat's haul of points in the round 14 match v Hurricanes at Sydney Football Stadium saw him register 177 points for the season – establishing a record for the most Super Rugby points in a season. Hewat's outstanding form in the 2006 Tooheys New Cup saw him awarded the Ken Catchpole Medal for 2006. The telling impact Hewat can have on a match was again evident when he came on as a replacement in the APC match against the Western Force. He came on as a replacement in the second half and scored a quick-fire 17 points in the space of 20 minutes, equalling the record for the most points in a match by a replacement, previously set by Tim Kelaher.

== Europe and Japan ==
After the end of the 2007 S14 season it was leaked to the press, and Hewat himself during a speakerphone incident with Lote Tuqiri, that he was not in the reckoning for a Wallaby position and will not be included in the squad. This left Hewat disillusioned and resulted in his decision to consider lucrative offers from overseas. On 27 July 2007, it was confirmed by NSWRU and Hewat that they had worked out a release so he could continue playing rugby over in Europe for London Irish.

In Hewat's second season with Irish they made the 2009 Premiership Rugby Final, with Hewat scoring an early drop goal after just 20 seconds in Irish's 10–9 defeat. On 12 April 2010, it was confirmed that Hewat was leaving London Irish to play in Japan.

== Coaching ==
After working with Eddie Jones at Suntory Sungoliath Hewat was inspired to go into coaching, starting as backs coach at Suntory. This was where he first met Dan McKellar, with whom he would work at the ACT Brumbies from 2017 to 2020,. After leaving the Brumbies Hewat joined Tokyo Black Rams as backs coach, before becoming head coach for three seasons. In June 2024, Hewat linked up with Michael Cheika after joining Leicester Tigers as attack and backs coach.

== Records and achievements ==
- The leading Super 12 pointscorer in his debut year (2005).
- The NSW record for points in a season, finishing with 243 points from 17 games during 2005.
- Second only to Matt Burke (1147) in all-time points for New South Wales
- He equalled Burke's record for scoring 100 season points in seven Super matches.
- He surpassed the 400 point mark for NSW in round 10 2006.
- Registered 177 points for the season – establishing a record for the most Super Rugby points in a season in the round 14 match v Hurricanes. This has since been broken by Dan Carter.
- Awarded the Ken Catchpole Medal for outstanding form in the 2006 Tooheys New Cup
