= 2006 Air New Zealand Cup =

Sports season

2006 Air New Zealand Cup season
- Countries: New Zealand
- Date: 28 July – 21 October 2006
- Champions: Waikato
- Runners-up: Wellington
- Matches played: 70
- Tries scored: 374 (average 5.3 per match)
- Top point scorer: Jimmy Gopperth (Wellington); 121 points
- Top try scorer: Richard Kahui (Waikato); 8 tries

Official website
- allblacks.com

The 2006 Air New Zealand Cup was the first season of a new structure for the National Provincial Championship (known as the Air New Zealand Cup for sponsorship reasons), contested by teams from New Zealand. The season ran from July to October 2006. At the end of the regular season, the top six teams were joined in the quarter-finals by the top team from each of the repechage routes, with the winners going through to the semi-finals. The winner of each semi-final qualified for the final, which was contested between Waikato and Wellington; Waikato won 37–31 to claim the first Air New Zealand Cup title.

This season was the first of the expanded competition, which has succeeded the First Division of the National Provincial Championship. It also saw the introduction of four new teams, Hawke's Bay, Counties Manukau, Manawatu and the newly formed Tasman (a merger of Nelson Bays and Marlborough). On 3 June 2006, the Commerce Commission accepted the NZRU proposal of a salary cap for the Air New Zealand Cup. This was mainly so that the talent pool of players could be spread between the 14 rugby unions.

== Competition format ==
Covering ten weeks, the schedule featured a total of 70 matches. The 14 unions were grouped by the top three places in each pool, they advanced and secured a spot in the top six. Auckland secured the top position at the start of the second round. Competition points from round one carried over to round two, and teams were seeded according to total points won. If necessary of a tiebreaker, when two or more teams finish on equal points, the union who defeated the other in a head-to-head gets placed higher. In case of a draw between them, the side with the biggest points deferential margin will get rights to be ranked above. If they are tied on points difference, it is then decided by a highest scored try count or a coin toss.

Three teams receive two home fixtures in Round Two:

- The first-place teams in each pool (Auckland in Pool A, Waikato in Pool B).
- The higher-ranked of the two second-place teams (Canterbury, which won a tiebreaker by virtue of a better point differential than North Harbour).

The remaining three teams receive only one home fixture apiece.

Similarly, the top two teams in each repechage pool, based on competition points earned in Round one (with tiebreakers applied as needed), earn two home fixtures in Round two, with the other teams receiving one apiece. Bay of Plenty and Counties Manukau earned the extra home fixture in Repechage A, while Southland and Taranaki earned this privilege in Repechage B.

In Round two saw each team in the competition played three fixtures in this round. In the Top Six, each team played the three teams that it did not play in Round one. Each team in the repechage pools played the other teams in its pool once.

For the teams in the Top Six, competition points carried over from Round one. All Top Six teams advanced to the quarterfinals, with their seedings determined by their positions at the end of Round two.

In the two repechage pools, competition points did not carry over from Round one. The top team in each pool at the end of Round two advanced to the quarterfinals. The two repechage winners received the seventh and eighth seeds, determined based on competition points at the end of Round two.

At the end of Week 9, Auckland, Waikato and North Harbour secured home quarter-finals. Bay of Plenty secured the top spot in Repechage A. In Repechage B, Taranaki dropped out of contention for the top spot.

After defeating Manawatu in Week 10, Bay of Plenty clinched the higher placing of the two repechage quarter-final slots. Also in Week 10, Otago's loss to Wellington placed Otago at the bottom of the Top 6 going into the quarter-finals. The fourth home quarter-final went to Wellington; although Canterbury defeated Auckland, they did not earn the bonus point they needed to pass Wellington on the table. Wellington's victory over Canterbury in Week 8 gave them the advantage in the tiebreaker.

Southland earned the top spot in Repechage B; despite losing 19–12 to Northland, the bonus point they earned for losing by only seven points put them one point ahead of the Taniwha in the standings.

The battle for the top overall seed came down to the final match in pool play. Waikato claimed the top seed by defeating North Harbour. Regardless of the Waikato–Harbour result, Auckland was assured of no worse than the second seed they eventually received. Harbour received the third seed.

== Standings ==
Pool A
Pos	Team	GP	W	D	L	PF	PA	PD	BP	Pts
1	Auckland	6	5	0	1	195	63	+132	5	25
2	North Harbour	6	5	0	1	142	92	+50	3	23
3	Wellington	6	5	0	1	121	90	+31	1	21
4	Bay of Plenty	6	3	0	3	116	129	−13	1	13
5	Taranaki	6	2	0	4	86	128	−42	1	9
6	Tasman	6	1	0	5	133	163	−30	4	8
7	Manawatu	6	0	0	6	46	174	−128	1	1

Pool B
Pos	Team	GP	W	D	L	PF	PA	PD	BP	Pts
1	Waikato	6	5	0	1	187	124	+63	4	24
2	Canterbury	6	5	0	1	170	87	+93	3	23
3	Otago	6	5	0	1	153	76	+77	3	23
4	Southland	6	2	0	4	88	123	−35	2	10
5	Counties Manukau	6	1	0	5	130	158	−28	5	9
6	Hawke's Bay	6	1	1	4	109	192	−83	2	8
7	Northland	6	1	1	4	104	181	−77	0	6

Overall
Pos	Team	GP	W	D	L	PF	PA	PD	BP	Pts
1	Waikato	9	7	1	1	277	182	+95	6	36
2	Auckland	9	6	1	2	287	119	+168	8	34
3	RS – North Harbour	9	7	0	2	206	158	+48	3	31
4	Wellington	9	7	0	2	189	165	+24	1	29
5	Canterbury	9	6	0	3	238	156	+82	5	29
6	Otago	9	5	0	4	192	173	+19	4	24
7	Bay of Plenty	3	3	0	0	100	34	+66	2	14
8	Southland	3	2	0	1	55	50	+5	1	9
9	Hawke's Bay	3	2	0	1	63	74	−11	1	9
10	Northland	3	2	0	1	57	85	−28	0	8
11	Taranaki	3	1	0	2	76	60	+16	3	7
12	Tasman	3	1	0	2	87	80	+7	1	5
13	Counties Manukau	3	0	1	2	65	93	−28	3	5
14	Manawatu	3	0	1	2	51	78	−27	0	2

== Regular season ==
=== Round 1 ===
28 July 2006
19:35 NZST

Hawke's Bay	0–45	Canterbury
	Report	Try: Cameron McIntyre (2), Mose Tuiali'i (2), Stephen Brett, Campbell Johnstone; Con: Ben Blair (6); Pen: Ben Blair

McLean Park, Napier
Referee: Paul Honiss

29 July 2006
14:00 NZST

Manawatu	10–41	Auckland
Try: Rob Foreman; Con: Graham Smith; Pen: Graham Smith	Report	Try: Jamie Helleur (2), Brad Mika, Lachie Munro, Saimone Taumoepeau, Joe Tekori, Brent Ward; Con: Brent Ward (2), Isa Nacewa

FMG Stadium, Palmerston North
Referee: Keith Brown

29 July 2006
16:00 NZST

Counties Manukau	19–23	Otago
Try: Kristian Ormsby; Con: Blair Feeney; Pen: Blair Feeney (4)	Report	Try: Josh Blackie, Callum Bruce; Con: Nick Evans (2); Pen: Nick Evans (3)

Mt Smart Stadium, Auckland
Referee: Jonathon White

29 July 2006
18:05 NZST

Taranaki	14–30	Wellington
Try: Matt Harvey; Pen: Miah Nikora (3)	Report	Try: Lome Fa'atau, Jimmy Gopperth, Cory Jane; Con: Jimmy Gopperth (3); Pen: Jimmy Gopperth (3)

Yarrow Stadium, New Plymouth
Referee: Kelvin Deaker

30 July 2006
14:35 NZST

Northland	21–36	Southland
Try: David Holwell, Rene Ranger; Con: David Holwell; Pen: David Holwell (3)	Report	Try: Dion Bates, Hoani MacDonald, Pehi Te Whare, Kane Thompson; Con: Blair Stewart (2); Pen: Blair Stewart (4)

ITM Stadium, Whangārei
Referee: Steve Walsh

30 July 2006
16:35 NZST

Tasman	27–33	North Harbour
Try: Kahn Fotuali'i, Tristan Moran, Peter Playford; Con: Ben Gollings (3); Pen: Ben Gollings (2)	Report	Try: Francis Stowers (2), Adrian Donald, Tusi Pisi, Viliame Waqaseduadua; Con: Tusi Pisi (4)

Lansdowne Park, Blenheim
Referee: Lyndon Bray

Bye/s: Bay of Plenty, Waikato

=== Round 2 ===
4 August 2006
19:35 NZST

Wellington	11–6	Bay of Plenty
Try: Cory Jane; Pen: Jimmy Gopperth (2)	Report	Pen: Murray Williams (2)

Westpac Stadium, Wellington
Attendance: 16,471

5 August 2006
14:35 NZST

Northland	11–25	Canterbury
Try: Marshall Milroy; Pen: Daniel Bowden (2)	Report	Try: Tim Bateman, Kevin O'Neill, Isaac Ross, Kevin Senio; Con: Stephen Brett; Pen: Cameron McIntyre

ITM Stadium, Whangārei
Referee: Jonathon White

5 August 2006
17:30 NZST

North Harbour	22–13	Taranaki
Try: Adrian Donald, James Hinchco; Pen: Luke McAlister (4)	Report	Try: Andrew Hore; Con: Miah Nikora; Pen: Miah Nikora (2)

North Harbour Stadium, Albany
Referee: Gary Wise

5 August 2006
19:35 NZST

Southland	14–23	Waikato
Try: Jimmy Cowan, Iona Sipa; Con: Blair Stewart (2)	Report	Try: Stephen Donald, Sitiveni Sivivatu; Con: Stephen Donald (2); Pen: Stephen Donald (3)

Rugby Park Stadium, Invercargill
Referee: Chris Pollock

6 August 2006
14:35 NZST

Auckland	46–6	Tasman
Try: Doug Howlett (2), Ben Atiga, Andrew Blowers, Isa Nacewa, David Smith, Isaia Toeava, Brent Ward; Con: Brent Ward (3)	Report	Pen: Ben Gollings (2)

Eden Park, Auckland
Referee: Chris Rooney

6 August 2006
16:35 NZST

Otago	37–0	Hawke's Bay
Try: Alando Soakai (2), Craig Clare, Tom Donnelly, Ben Smith; Con: Nick Evans (3); Pen: Nick Evans (2)	Report

Carisbrook, Dunedin
Referee: Keith Brown

Bye/s: Manawatu, Counties Manukau

=== Round 3 ===
11 August 2006
19:35 NZST

Waikato	36–22	Canterbury
Try: Richard Kahui (2), Stephen Donald, Liam Messam, Sitiveni Sivivatu; Con: Stephen Donald (4); Pen: Stephen Donald	Report	Try: Casey Laulala (2), Caleb Ralph; Con: Ben Blair (2); Pen: Ben Blair

Waikato Stadium, Hamilton
Referee: Kelvin Deaker

12 August 2006
14:35 NZST

Tasman	43–0	Manawatu
Try: Robbie Malneek (3), Ben Gollings, Ti'i Paulo, Jonathan Poff; Con: Ben Gollings (5); Pen: Ben Gollings	Report

Lansdowne Park, Blenheim
Referee: Keith Brown

12 August 2006
17:30 NZST

Taranaki	3–29	Auckland
Pen: Miah Nikora	Report	Try: Doug Howlett, Taniela Moa, Joe Rokocoko, Sam Tuitupou; Con: Brent Ward (3); Pen: Brent Ward

Yarrow Stadium, New Plymouth
Referee: Chris Pollock

12 August 2006
19:35 NZST

Bay of Plenty	7–25	North Harbour
Try: James Afoa; Con: Mike Delany	Report	Try: Roger Dustow, George Pisi, Viliame Waqaseduadua; Con: Luke McAlister (2); Pen: Luke McAlister (2)

Blue Chip Stadium, Mt Maunganui
Referee: (England) Chris White

13 August 2006
14:35 NZST

Hawke's Bay	51–29	Counties Manukau
Try: Bryn Evans, Ryan Glover, Michael Johnson, Danny Lee, Lote Raikabula, Tom Symes, Joe Wright; Con: Aayden Clarke (5); Pen: Matt Berquist, Aayden Clarke	Report	Try: Lelia Masaga (2), Simon Lemalu, Troy Nathan; Con: Blair Feeney (3); Pen: Blair Feeney

McLean Park, Napier
Referee: Lyndon Bray

13 August 2006
16:35 NZST

Otago	37–6	Northland
Try: Neil Brew, Nick Evans, Chris King, Greg Zampach; Con: Nick Evans (4); Pen: Nick Evans (3)	Report	Pen: Daniel Bowden (2)

Carisbrook, Dunedin
Referee: Paul Honiss

Bye/s: Southland, Wellington

=== Round 4 ===
18 August 2006
19:35 NZST

Canterbury	24–7	Southland
Try: Ben Blair, Craig Clarke; Con: Cameron McIntyre; Pen: Cameron McIntyre (4)	Report	Try: Hale T-Pole; Con: Blair Stewart

Jade Stadium, Christchurch
Referee: Lyndon Bray

19 August 2006
12:00 NZST

Manawatu	12–18	Taranaki
Try: Nathan Kemp, Hayden Triggs; Con: Ryan Bambry	Report	Try: Laurence Corlett, Brendan Haami; Con: Miah Nikora; Pen: Miah Nikora (2)

FMG Stadium, Palmerston North
Referee: Josh Noonan

19 August 2006
14:00 NZST

Otago	24–21	Waikato
Try: Josh Blackie, Filipo Levi, Greg Zampach; Con: Nick Evans (3); Pen: Nick Evans	Report	Try: Brendon Leonard, Liam Messam; Con: Stephen Donald; Pen: Stephen Donald (3)

Carisbrook, Dunedin
Referee: Gary Wise

20 August 2006
12:30 NZST

Counties Manukau	17–21	Northland
Try: Blair Feeney, Niva Ta'auso; Con: Blair Feeney (2); Pen: Blair Feeney	Report	Try: David Holwell, Josh Levi, Jake Paringatai; Con: David Holwell (3)

Mt Smart Stadium, Auckland
Referee: Chris Pollock

20 August 2006
14:35 NZST

Auckland	45–27	Bay of Plenty
Try: Steve Devine (2), David Smith (2), Brent Ward (2); Con: Brent Ward (3); Pen: Brent Ward (2)	Report	Try: Cory Aporo (2), Nili Latu; Con: Mike Delany (3); Pen: Mike Delany (2)

Eden Park, Auckland
Referee: Steve Walsh

20 August 2006
16:35 NZST

North Harbour	31–16	Wellington
Try: Viliami Maʻafu, George Pisi, Anthony Tuitavake, Viliame Waqaseduadua; Con: Tusi Pisi (4); Pen: Tusi Pisi	Report	Try: Ross Filipo; Con: Jimmy Gopperth; Pen: Jimmy Gopperth (3)

North Harbour Stadium, Albany
Referee: Paul Honiss

Bye/s: Tasman, Hawke's Bay

=== Round 5 ===
25 August 2006
19:35 NZST

Southland	8–15	Otago
Try: Clarke Dermody; Drop: Blair Stewart	Report	Try: Ben Smith, Adam Thomson; Con: Nick Evans; Pen: Nick Evans

Rugby Park Stadium, Invercargill
Referee: Jonathon White

26 August 2006
14:35 NZST

Bay of Plenty	33–15	Manawatu
Try: Charles Baxter (2), Jamie Nutbrown; Con: Mike Delany (3); Pen: Mike Delany (4)	Report	Try: Nick Crosswell, Penalty try Con: Ryan Bambry; Pen: Ryan Bambry

Rotorua International Stadium, Rotorua
Referee: Gary Wise

26 August 2006
17:30 NZST

Waikato	23–20	Counties Manukau
Try: Sosene Anesi, Mark Burman, Roger Randle; Con: Stephen Donald; Pen: Stephen Donald (2)	Report	Try: Siale Piutau, Taiasina Tuifu'a; Con: Blair Feeney (2); Pen: Blair Feeney (2)

Waikato Stadium, Hamilton
Referee: Bryce Lawrence

26 August 2006
19:35 NZST

Wellington	14–11	Auckland
Try: Ross Filipo, Ben Herring; Con: Tamati Ellison (2)	Report	Try: Onosai Tololima-Auva'a; Pen: Brent Ward (2)

Westpac Stadium, Wellington
Attendance: 10,406
Referee: Kelvin Deaker

27 August 2006
14:35 NZST

Taranaki	22–15	Tasman
Try: Lifeimi Mafi, Paul Perez, Tomasi Soqeta; Con: Miah Nikora (2); Pen: Miah Nikora	Report	Try: Mark Bright, Kahn Fotuali'i; Con: Tim Taylor; Pen: Tim Taylor

Yarrow Stadium, New Plymouth
Referee: Chris Pollock

27 August 2006
16:35 NZST

Northland	24–24	Hawke's Bay
Try: Jake Paringatai, Hayden Taylor; Con: David Holwell; Pen: David Holwell (4)	Report	Try: Nathan Mauger (2), Tafai Ioasa; Con: Aayden Clarke (3); Pen: Aayden Clarke

ITM Stadium, Whangārei
Referee: Steve Walsh

Bye/s: Canterbury, North Harbour

=== Round 6 ===
1 September 2006
19:35 NZST

Auckland	23–3	North Harbour
Try: Daniel Braid, Chris Heard; Con: Brent Ward (2); Pen: Brent Ward (3)	Report	Pen: Tusi Pisi

Eden Park, Auckland
Referee: Gary Wise

2 September 2006
14:35 NZST

Tasman	17–23	Bay of Plenty
Try: Ben Gollings, Aaron Kimura; Pen: Tim Taylor	Report	Try: Jamie Nutbrown, Anthony Tahana; Con: Mike Delany (2); Pen: Mike Delany (3)

Lansdowne Park, Blenheim
Referee: Keith Brown

2 September 2006
17:30 NZST

Manawatu	3–11	Wellington
Pen: Graham Smith	Report	Try: Conrad Smith; Pen: Tamati Ellison (2)

FMG Stadium, Palmerston North
Referee: Kelvin Deaker

2 September 2006
19:35 NZST

Canterbury	22–17	Otago
Try: Campbell Johnstone, Cameron McIntyre, Mose Tuiali'i; Con: Ben Blair (2); Pen: Ben Blair	Report	Try: Josh Blackie, Greg Zampach; Con: Nick Evans (2); Pen: Nick Evans

Jade Stadium, Christchurch
Referee: Bryce Lawrence

3 September 2006
14:35 NZST

Hawke's Bay	23–42	Waikato
Try: Tukulua Lokotui, Nathan Mauger, Lote Raikabula; Con: Aayden Clarke; Pen: Matt Berquist, Aayden Clarke	Report	Try: Sosene Anesi, Sione Lauaki, Liam Messam, Willie Ripia, Stephen Setephano; Con: David Hill (4); Pen: David Hill (3)

McLean Park, Napier
Referee: Matt Stanish

3 September 2006
16:35 NZST

Counties Manukau	29–8	Southland
Try: Ben Meyer (2), Kristian Ormsby (2), Lelia Masaga; Con: Blair Feeney (2)	Report	Try: Blair Stewart; Pen: Blair Stewart

Mt Smart Stadium, Auckland
Referee: Paul Honiss

Bye/s: Northland, Taranaki

=== Round 7 ===
8 September 2006
19:35 NZST

North Harbour	28–6	Manawatu
Try: Anthony Tuitavake (2), George Pisi, Nick Williams, Rudi Wulf; Pen: Tusi Pisi	Report	Pen: Graham Smith (2)

North Harbour Stadium, Albany
Referee: Jonathon White

9 September 2006
14:35 NZST

Waikato	42–21	Northland
Try: Richard Kahui (3), Roy Kinikinilau, Liam Messam, Dwayne Sweeney; Con: David Hill (6)	Report	Try: Daniel Bowden, David Gibson; Con: David Holwell; Pen: David Holwell (3)

Waikato Stadium, Hamilton
Referee: Keith Brown

9 September 2006
17:30 NZST

Southland	15–11	Hawke's Bay
Pen: Blair Stewart (5)	Report	Try: Danny Lee; Pen: Matt Berquist (2)

Rugby Park Stadium, Invercargill
Referee: Bryce Lawrence

9 September 2006
19:35 NZST

Bay of Plenty	20–16	Taranaki
Try: Anthony Tahana; Pen: Mike Delany (5)	Report	Try: Scott Waldrom; Con: Miah Nikora; Pen: Miah Nikora (3)

Blue Chip Stadium, Mt Maunganui
Referee: Kelvin Deaker

10 September 2006
14:35 NZST

Canterbury	32–16	Counties Manukau
Try: Stephen Brett, Scott Hamilton, Kieran Read, Isaac Ross; Con: Cameron McIntyre (3); Pen: Cameron McIntyre (2)	Report	Try: Andrew van der Heijden; Con: Blair Feeney; Pen: Blair Feeney (3)

Jade Stadium, Christchurch
Referee: Chris Pollock

10 September 2006
16:35 NZST

Wellington	39–25	Tasman
Try: Tamati Ellison, Cory Jane, Alby Mathewson, Jeremy Thrush, Tana Umaga; Con: Jimmy Gopperth (4); Pen: Jimmy Gopperth (2)	Report	Try: Cory Holdaway, James King, Peter Playford; Con: Tim Taylor (2); Pen: Tim Taylor (2)

Westpac Stadium, Wellington
Attendance: 11,200
Referee: Matt Stanish

Bye/s: Auckland, Otago

=== Round 8 ===
15 September 2006
18:05 NZST

Taranaki	17–23	Northland
Try: Miah Nikora, Lifeimi Mafi, Michael Tagicakibau; Con: Miah Nikora	Report	Try: Tony Coughlan, Dan Goodwin; Con: David Holwell (2); Pen: David Holwell (3)

Yarrow Stadium, New Plymouth
Referee: Vinny Munro

15 September 2006
20:05 NZST

Hawke's Bay	26–10	Manawatu
Try: Israel Dagg, Jacob Kennedy, Danny Lee, Tukulua Lokotui; Con: Matt Berquist (2), Aayden Clarke	Report	Try: Leon Lubbe; Con: Graham Smith; Pen: Graham Smith

McLean Park, Napier
Referee: Matt Stanish

16 September 2006
14:35 NZST

Southland	23–14	Tasman
Try: Watisoni Lotawa, Kendrick Lynn; Con: Blair Stewart (2); Pen: Blair Stewart (3)	Report	Try: Robbie Malneek; Pen: Ben Gollings (3)

Rugby Park Stadium, Invercargill
Referee: Kelvin Deaker

16 September 2006
17:30 NZST

Bay of Plenty	38–11	Counties Manukau
Try: Nili Latu, Aaron Rameka, Hayden Reid, Murray Williams; Con: Murray Williams (3); Pen: Murray Williams (4)	Report	Try: James Maher; Pen: Blair Feeney, Troy Nathan

Blue Chip Stadium, Mt Maunganui
Referee: Jonathon White

16 September 2006
19:35 NZST

Auckland	22–22	Waikato
Try: Kurtis Haiu, Brad Mika, David Smith, Saimone Taumoepeau; Con: Ben Atiga	Report	Try: Roy Kinikinilau, Liam Messam, Dwayne Sweeney; Con: David Hill (2); Pen: David Hill

Eden Park, Auckland
Referee: Chris Pollock

17 September 2006
14:35 NZST

North Harbour	28–18	Otago
Try: James Rodley, Anthony Tuitavake, Nick Williams; Con: Tusi Pisi (2); Pen: Tusi Pisi (3)	Report	Try: Neil Brew (2); Con: Nick Evans; Pen: Nick Evans (2)

North Harbour Stadium, Albany
Referee: Bryce Lawrence

17 September 2006
16:35 NZST

Wellington	26–24	Canterbury
Try: Cory Jane, Ma'a Nonu; Con: Jimmy Gopperth (2); Pen: Jimmy Gopperth (4)	Report	Try: Stephen Brett, Casey Laulala; Con: Cameron McIntyre; Pen: Cameron McIntyre (3); Drop: Andy Ellis

Westpac Stadium, Wellington
Attendance: 14,310
Referee: Paul Honiss

=== Round 9 ===
21 September 2006
19:05 NZST

Southland	20–17	Taranaki
Try: Watisoni Lotawa (2); Con: Blair Stewart (2); Pen: Blair Stewart (2)	Report	Try: Census Johnston, Scott Waldrom; Con: Kurt Morath, Miah Nikora; Pen: Miah Nikora

Rugby Park Stadium, Invercargill
Referee: Gary Wise

22 September 2006
18:05 NZST

Bay of Plenty	35–7	Hawke's Bay
Try: Charles Baxter, Garrick Cowley, Simms Davison, Lance MacDonald, Murray Williams; Con: Murray Williams (2); Pen: Murray Williams (2)	Report	Try: Sona Taumalolo; Con: Aayden Clarke

Blue Chip Stadium, Mt Maunganui
Referee: Chris Pollock

22 September 2006
20:05 NZST

Counties Manukau	25–25	Manawatu
Try: Grant Henson, Lelia Masaga, Andrew van der Heijden; Con: Troy Nathan (2); Pen: Troy Nathan (2)	Report	Try: Francisco Bosch, Graham Smith, Tane Tuʻipulotu; Con: Matty James (2); Pen: Matty James (2)

Mt Smart Stadium, Auckland
Referee: Brent Murray

23 September 2006
14:35 NZST

Tasman	56–15	Northland
Try: Peter Playford (4), Rico Gear, Lucky Mulipola, Jonathan Poff; Con: Aaron Kimura (6); Pen: Aaron Kimura (3)	Report	Try: Justin Collins, Tim Dow; Con: David Holwell; Pen: David Holwell

Lansdowne Park, Blenheim
Referee: Lyndon Bray

23 September 2006
17:30 NZST

Waikato	37–21	Wellington
Try: Sitiveni Sivivatu (2), Byron Kelleher, Brendon Leonard, Liam Messam; Con: David Hill (3); Pen: David Hill (2)	Report	Try: Jimmy Gopperth, Ben Herring, Cory Jane; Con: Jimmy Gopperth (3)

Waikato Stadium, Hamilton
Referee: Steve Walsh

23 September 2006
19:35 NZST

Auckland	48–7	Otago
Try: Andrew Blowers, Tasesa Lavea, Taniela Moa, Lachie Munro, Isa Nacewa, Isaia Toeava; Con: Brent Ward (4), Ben Atiga (2); Pen: Brent Ward (2)	Report	Try: Greg Zampach; Con: Nick Evans

Eden Park, Auckland
Referee: Paul Honiss

24 September 2006
16:35 NZST

Canterbury	17–21	North Harbour
Try: Scott Hamilton, Cameron McIntyre; Con: Cameron McIntyre (2); Pen: Cameron McIntyre	Report	Try: Viliame Waqaseduadua (2), Rua Tipoki; Con: Luke McAlister (3)

Jade Stadium, Christchurch
Referee: Kelvin Deaker

=== Round 10 ===
28 September 2006
19:05 NZST

Manawatu	16–27	Bay of Plenty
Try: Francisco Bosch; Con: Graham Smith; Pen: Matty James (3)	Report	Try: Cory Aporo, Jamie Nutbrown, Warren Smith; Con: Murray Williams (3); Pen: Murray Williams (2)

FMG Stadium, Palmerston North
Referee: Gary Wise

29 September 2006
19:35 NZST

Otago	14–21	Wellington
Try: Josh Blackie; Pen: Nick Evans (3)	Report	Try: Cory Jane, Ma'a Nonu, Tana Umaga; Con: Jimmy Gopperth (3)

Carisbrook, Dunedin
Referee: Kelvin Deaker

30 September 2006
14:35 NZST

Counties Manukau	29–30	Hawke's Bay
Try: Lance Easton, Kane Hancy, Grant Henson, Nigel Watson; Con: Troy Nathan (3); Pen: Troy Nathan	Report	Try: Danny Lee, Karl Lowe, Daniel Waenga; Con: Matt Berquist (2), Aayden Clarke; Pen: Matt Berquist (3)

Mt Smart Stadium, Auckland
Referee: Josh Noonan

30 September 2006
17:30 NZST

Taranaki	42–17	Tasman
Try: Paul Perez (2), Census Johnston, Asalemo Malo, Tony Penn; Con: Kurt Morath (4); Pen: Kurt Morath (3)	Report	Try: Rico Gear, Lucky Mulipola; Con: Aaron Kimura (2); Pen: Aaron Kimura

Yarrow Stadium, New Plymouth
Referee: Paul Honiss

30 September 2006
19:35 NZST

Canterbury	27–22	Auckland
Try: Craig Clarke, Wyatt Crockett, Scott Hamilton; Con: Dan Carter (3); Pen: Dan Carter (2)	Report	Try: Sam Tuitupou; Con: Ben Atiga; Pen: Ben Atiga (3), Brent Ward (2)

Jade Stadium, Christchurch
Referee: Steve Walsh

1 October 2006
14:35 NZST

Northland	19–12	Southland
Try: Justin Collins, Dan Goodwin, David Holwell; Con: David Holwell (2)	Report	Pen: Blair Stewart (4)

ITM Stadium, Whangārei
Referee: Lyndon Bray

1 October 2006
16:35 NZST

Waikato	31–15	North Harbour
Try: Sitiveni Sivivatu (2), Richard Kahui, Byron Kelleher; Con: Stephen Donald (4); Pen: Stephen Donald	Report	Try: Luke McAlister, Ngarimu Simpkins; Con: Luke McAlister; Pen: Luke McAlister

Waikato Stadium, Hamilton
Referee: Bryce Lawrence

== Play-offs ==
Quarter-finals
4	Wellington	36
5	Canterbury	23
2	Auckland	46
7	Bay of Plenty	14
1	Waikato	24
8	Southland	12
3	North Harbour	21
6	Otago	56

Semi-finals
2	Auckland	15
4	Wellington	30
1	Waikato	44
6	Otago	15

Final
1	Waikato	37
4	Wellington	31

=== Quarter-finals ===
6 October 2006
19:35 NZST

Wellington	36–23	Canterbury
Try: Collins (2); M. Schwalger; Smith; Tialata; Con: Gopperth (4); Drop: Gopperth	Report	Try: Carter; Paterson; Con: Carter (2); Pen: Carter (3)

Westpac Stadium, Wellington
Attendance: 17,641
Referee: Bryce Lawrence

7 October 2006
17:30 NZST

Auckland	46–14	Bay of Plenty
Try: Haiu; Heard; Howlett; Kaino; Mika; Rokocoko; Con: Atiga (3); Nacewa (2); Pen: Atiga (2)	Report	Try: Aporo; Nutbrown; Con: Williams (2)

Eden Park, Auckland
Referee: Lyndon Bray

7 October 2006
19:35 NZST

Waikato	24–12	Southland
Try: Anesi de Malmanche; Muliaina; Con: Hill (3); Pen: Hill	Report	Try: Wilson (2); Con: Wilson

Waikato Stadium, Hamilton
Referee: Steve Walsh

8 October 2006
16:35 NZST

North Harbour	21–56	Otago
Try: Tipoki; Tuitavake; Wulf; Con: Pisi (3)	Report	Try: Bruce; Clare; Hesketh; Morland; Ryan; Saunders; Thomson; Con: Evans (4); Bruce (2); Pen: Bruce (2); Evans

North Harbour Stadium, Albany
Referee: Paul Honiss

=== Semi-finals ===
13 October 2006
19:35 NZST

Auckland	15–30	Wellington
Try: Nacewa; Toeava; Con: Atiga; Pen: Atiga	Report	Try: Collins; Smith; Tialata; Umaga; Con: Gopperth (2); Pen: Gopperth (2)

Eden Park, Auckland
Referee: Paul Honiss

14 October 2006
19:35 NZST

Waikato	44–15	Otago
Try: Anesi (2); Bates; Kahui; Leonard; Sivivatu; Con: Hill (4); Pen: Hill (2)	Report	Try: Blackie; Boys; Con: Evans; Pen: Evans

Waikato Stadium, Hamilton
Referee: Bryce Lawrence

=== Final ===
21 October 2006
19:35 NZST

Waikato	37–31	Wellington
Try: Kahui 15' c Kelleher (2) 27' c, 42' c Leonard 70' c Con: Hill (4/4) 16', 28', 43', 71'; Pen: Hill (3/3) 37', 54', 77'	Report	Try: Nonu (2) 32' c, 72' m Umaga 79' c Con: Gopperth (2/3) 33', 79'; Pen: Gopperth (4/5) 8', 19', 50', 69'

Waikato Stadium, Hamilton
Attendance: 25,000
Referee: Bryce Lawrence

FB	15	Mils Muliaina
RW	14	Sosene Anesi
OC	13	Richard Kahui
IC	12	David Hill
LW	11	Sitiveni Sivivatu
FH	10	Stephen Donald
SH	9	Byron Kelleher	(substituted off) 68'
N8	8	Sione Lauaki	(substituted off) 40'
OF	7	Marty Holah
BF	6	Steven Bates (c)
RL	5	Keith Robinson
LL	4	Jono Gibbes
TP	3	Nathan White
HK	2	Tom Willis
LP	1	Craig West	(substituted off) 60'
Replacements:
HK	16	Scott Linklater
PR	17	Aled de Malmanche	(substituted in) 60'
LK	18	Toby Lynn
FL	19	Liam Messam	(substituted in) 40'
SH	20	Brendon Leonard	(substituted in) 68'
CE	21	Dwayne Sweeney
WG	22	Roy Kinikinilau

FB	15	Shannon Paku	(substituted off) 60'
RW	14	Ma'a Nonu
OC	13	Conrad Smith
IC	12	Tana Umaga (c)
LW	11	Cory Jane
FH	10	Jimmy Gopperth
SH	9	Piri Weepu	(substituted off) 66'
N8	8	Rodney So'oialo
OF	7	Ben Herring	(substituted off) 43'
BF	6	Jerry Collins
RL	5	Luke Andrews
LL	4	Ross Filipo
TP	3	John Schwalger
HK	2	Mahonri Schwalger	(substituted off) 68'
LP	1	Joe McDonnell	(substituted off) 20'
Replacements:
HK	16	Luke Mahoney	(substituted in) 68'
PR	17	Anthony Perenise	(substituted in) 20'
LK	18	Jeremy Thrush
FL	19	Chris Masoe	(substituted in) 43'
SH	20	Alby Mathewson	(substituted in) 66'
FH	21	Miah Nikora
WG	22	Lome Fa'atau	(substituted in) 60'

== Statistics ==
Top points scorers
Player	Team	Tries	Conversions	Penalties	Drop goals	Total
Brent Ward	Auckland	4	13	8	0	70
Nick Evans	Otago	1	15	11	0	68
Mike Delany	Bay of Plenty	0	9	14	0	62
Blair Feeney	Counties Manukau	1	11	11	0	60
Stephen Donald	Waikato	2	8	9	0	51
Jimmy Gopperth	Wellington	1	8	10	0	51
David Holwell	Northland	2	6	10	0	49
Blair Stewart	Southland	1	5	10	1	48
Miah Nikora	Taranaki	0	5	12	0	46
Cameron McIntyre	Canterbury	3	4	7	0	44

== See also ==
- 2006 Heartland Championship
