= 2006 Air New Zealand Cup final =

2006 Air New Zealand Cup Final
- Event: 2006 Air New Zealand Cup
Waikato	Wellington
37	31
- Date: 21 October 2006
- Venue: Waikato Stadium, Hamilton
- Referee: Bryce Lawrence (New Zealand)

The 2006 Air New Zealand Cup final was contested on 21 October 2006 by Waikato and Wellington. Waikato won 37–31 to give them their first Air New Zealand Cup title. The match was the last of the 2006 Air New Zealand Cup season, and was hosted by Waikato at Waikato Stadium. It was the first final in the history of the domestic rugby competition. Waikato had qualified highest during the regular season, while Wellington qualified fourth.

Waikato won their semi-final, where they beat Otago 44–15. Wellington travelled to Auckland where they beat Auckland in their semi-final. Waikato hosted the final after qualifying higher than Wellington, who had to travel back from Auckland for the match.

== Road to the final ==
Pool A
Pos.	Team	Pld	W	D	L	PF	PA	PD	BP	Pts
1	Auckland	6	5	0	1	195	63	+132	5	25
2	North Harbour	6	5	0	1	142	92	+50	3	23
3	Wellington	6	5	0	1	121	90	+31	1	21
4	Bay of Plenty	6	3	0	3	116	129	-13	1	13
5	Taranaki	6	2	0	4	86	128	-42	1	9
6	Tasman	6	1	0	5	133	163	-30	4	8
7	Manawatu	6	0	0	6	46	174	-128	1	1

Pool B
Pos.	Team	Pld	W	D	L	PF	PA	PD	BP	Pts
1	Waikato	6	5	0	1	187	124	+63	4	24
2	Canterbury (RS)	6	5	0	1	170	87	+93	3	23
3	Otago	6	5	0	1	153	76	+77	3	23
4	Southland	6	2	0	4	88	123	-35	2	10
5	Counties Manukau	6	1	0	5	130	158	-28	5	9
6	Hawke's Bay	6	1	1	4	109	192	-83	2	8
7	Northland	6	1	1	4	104	181	-77	0	6

Top Six
Pos.	Team	Pld	W	D	L	PF	PA	PD	BP	Pts
1	Waikato	9	7	1	1	277	182	+95	6	36
2	Auckland	9	6	1	2	287	119	+168	8	34
3	North Harbour (RS)	9	7	0	2	206	158	+48	3	31
4	Wellington	9	7	1	1	189	165	+24	1	29
5	Canterbury	9	6	0	3	238	156	+82	5	29
6	Otago	9	5	0	4	192	173	+19	4	24

Repechage A
Pos.	Team	Pld	W	D	L	PF	PA	PD	BP	Pts
1	Bay of Plenty	3	3	0	0	100	34	+66	2	14
2	Hawke's Bay	3	2	0	1	63	74	-11	1	9
3	Counties Manukau	3	0	1	2	65	93	-28	3	5
4	Manawatu	3	0	1	2	51	78	-27	0	2

Repechage B
Pos.	Team	Pld	W	D	L	PF	PA	PD	BP	Pts
1	Southland	3	2	0	1	55	50	+5	1	9
2	Northland	3	2	0	1	57	85	-28	0	8
3	Taranaki	3	1	0	2	76	60	+16	3	7
4	Tasman	3	1	0	2	87	80	+7	1	5

Quarter-finals
6 October – Wellington
Wellington	36
Canterbury	23
7 October – Auckland
Auckland	46
Bay of Plenty	14
7 October – Hamilton
Waikato	24
Southland	12
8 October – Albany
North Harbour	21
Otago	56

Semi-finals
13 October – Auckland
Auckland	15
Wellington	30
14 October – Hamilton
Waikato	44
Otago	15

Final
21 October – Hamilton
Waikato	37
Wellington	31

== Match ==
=== Summary ===
Waikato claimed the Air New Zealand Cup with a four tries to three 37–31 win over Wellington in ideal conditions in Hamilton.

The final margin suggested a closer match than was actually the case. Waikato dominated for long periods of the game. When Waikato's replacement halfback Brendon Leonard went over from a scrum just out from the Wellington line after 71 minutes, Waikato Stadium's full house of 25,000 rejoiced. They knew they had their first national title since 1992.

There was a momentary concern for fans when Wellington wing Ma'a Nonu scored his second try, two minutes later, and when captain Tana Umaga scored with less than a minute remaining but Wellington was still six points behind and the damage had been done. Flanker Marty Holah was outstanding in the rucks and mauls for Waikato while halfback Byron Kelleher had his most competitive appearance in recent weeks. Locks Keith Robinson and Jono Gibbes kept the pressure on the Wellington lineout which was its shoddiest of the year.

At crucial lineouts its execution was deficient on too many occasions. David Hill, who is also leaving for the northern hemisphere, kicked 17 points for Waikato.

Wellington was forced to battle without its leading prop Neemia Tialata, who did not start, and then it lost Joe McDonnell halfway through the first half. That brought Anthony Perenise on to the tighthead side of the scrum for only his third first-class appearance.

It was a significant loss, more in terms of the leadership Tialata brought to the forward effort over the past few weeks. The match, in front of a capacity crowd of just over 25,000, started at breakneck speed with both teams throwing passes with gay abandon and it was Wellington that had the first success with a seventh-minute penalty goal to first five-eighths Jimmy Gopperth.

Two Waikato errors, an accidental offside from a lineout move, and knock-ons by Kelleher and wing Sitiveni Sivivatu cost it 70 metres in ground. Wellington then made its own mistake with a lineout throw taken by Holah and it stormed back into the Wellington half. And when captain and flanker Steven Bates won a clean lineout take, the ball was spun and while second five-eighths David Hill took a big hit, his transfer to wing Sosene Anesi was inch perfect and he burst into a gap and when tackled he found centre Richard Kahui on hand to race in for the opening try. Hill got up from his tackle and landed the conversion.

Gopperth landed his second penalty goal after 19 minutes to get Wellington back to within one point at 6–7.

Waikato used its lineout to good effect to set up its second try, scored after 27 minutes by Kelleher. Several drives were made at the line with lock Keith Robinson hit in a big tackle by flanker Jerry Collins. However, Waikato controlled the ball provided under the posts by the halfback. Wellington then fouled its own chance with indecisive ball from a scrum. Gopperth was forced to tidy a poor pass from halfback Piri Weepu and in the tackle by Holah the ball was lost with Waikato clearing downfield.

Wellington regained the ball from a turnover, the ball was moved left, then right, and No.8 Rodney So'oialo sold a big dummy to Kahui. He sped through the gap and after drawing the defence found the flying Nonu in support and he scored beneath the posts. Gopperth's conversion made the score 13–14. A 36th-minute penalty goal to Hill gave Waikato its lead.

The second half had a controversial start when from a Wellington scrum about 10m out from its line Holah kicked the ball through and as Weepu waited for the ball to cross the line, he found Kelleher sliding through to win the try. Hill landed a splendid conversion to take Waikato out to 24–13. Gopperth and Hill exchanged penalty goals in the ninth and 13th minutes.

=== Details ===
21 October 2006

Waikato	37 – 31	Wellington
Try: Byron Kelleher (2); Richard Kahui; Brendon Leonard; Con: David Hill (4); Pen: David Hill (3)	allblacks.com	Try: Ma'a Nonu (2); Tana Umaga; Con: Jimmy Gopperth (2); Pen: Jimmy Gopperth (4)

Waikato Stadium, Hamilton
Attendance: 25,000
Referee: (New Zealand) Bryce Lawrence

Waikato	Wellington

WAIKATO:
FB	15	Mils Muliaina
RW	14	Sosene Anesi
OC	13	Richard Kahui
IC	12	David Hill
LW	11	Sitiveni Sivivatu
FH	10	Stephen Donald
SH	9	Byron Kelleher
N8	8	Sione Lauaki
OF	7	Marty Holah
BF	6	Steven Bates (c)
RL	5	Keith Robinson
LL	4	Jono Gibbes
TP	3	Nathan White
HK	2	Tom Willis
LP	1	Craig West
Substitutes:
Bn	16	Scott Linklater
Bn	17	Aled de Malmanche
Bn	18	Toby Lynn
Bn	19	Liam Messam
Bn	20	Brendon Leonard
Bn	21	Dwayne Sweeney
Bn	22	Roy Kinikinilau
Coach:
(New Zealand) Warren Gatland

WELLINGTON:
FB	15	Shannon Paku
RW	14	Ma'a Nonu
OC	13	Conrad Smith
IC	12	Tana Umaga (c)
LW	11	Cory Jane
FH	10	Jimmy Gopperth
SH	9	Piri Weepu
N8	8	Rodney So'oialo
OF	7	Ben Herring
BF	6	Jerry Collins
RL	5	Luke Andrews
LL	4	Ross Filipo
TP	3	John Schwalger
HK	2	Mahonri Schwalger
LP	1	Joe McDonnell
Substitutions:
Bn	16	Luke Mahoney
Bn	17	Anthony Perenise
Bn	18	Jeremy Thrush
Bn	19	Chris Masoe
Bn	20	Alby Mathewson
Bn	21	Miah Nikora
Bn	22	Lome Fa'atau
Coach:
(New Zealand) John Plumtree
