= 2006 IRB Pacific 5 Nations =

- The logo of the 2006 IRB Pacific 5 Nations

Tournament details
- Countries: Fiji; Japan; Junior All Blacks; Samoa; Tonga
- Tournament format(s): Round-robin
- Date: 3 June - 1 July 2006

Tournament statistics
- Teams: 5
- Matches played: 10
- Attendance: 66,917 (6,692 per match)
- Tries scored: 67 (6.7 per match)
- Top point scorer(s): James Gopperth (Junior All Blacks) (47 points)
- Top try scorer(s): Anthony Tuitavake (Junior All Blacks) (4 tries)

Final
- Champions: Junior All Blacks (1st title)
- Runners-up: Samoa

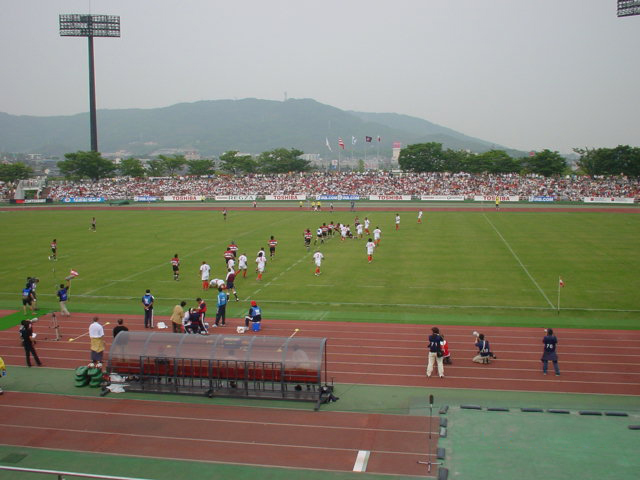
Japan playing Tonga at Honjo stadium on 4 June 2006

The 2006 IRB Pacific 5 Nations was the inaugural IRB Pacific 5 Nations rugby union competition held between five Pacific Rim sides; Fiji, Japan, Samoa, Tonga and the Junior All Blacks (New Zealand's second XV). The inaugural tournament kicked off on 3 June 2006 with the Junior All Blacks proclaimed the winner after their 38–8 defeat of Japan on 24 June 2006.

Australia was invited to take part but decided against sending a team as they wanted to focus on their domestic competition. However, Australia hosted two games, and Australian Rugby Union CEO Gary Flowers stated that Australia was keen to participate in the tournament from 2007 onwards. On 18 October 2006, it was announced that they would send their second XV. For this reason, the inaugural tournament was the only one to be known as the "Pacific 5 Nations", and from 2007 the competition was known as the Pacific Nations Cup.

== Point system ==
The tournament is a round-robin of ten games, where each team plays one match against each of the other teams. There are four points for a win, two points for a draw and none for a defeat. There are also bonus points offered with one bonus point for scoring four or more tries in a match and one bonus point for losing by 7 points or less.

== Table ==
2006 IRB Pacific 5 Nations
	Team	Played	Won	Drawn	Lost	Points For	Points Against	Points Difference	Tries For	Tries Against	Try Bonus	Losing Bonus	Points
1	Junior All Blacks	4	4	0	0	167	47	+120	22	6	4	0	20
2	Samoa	4	2	0	2	121	88	+33	18	9	2	1	11
3	Fiji	4	2	0	2	92	94	-2	10	12	1	1	10
4	Tonga	4	2	0	2	91	113	-22	12	13	1	0	9
5	Japan	4	0	0	4	48	177	-129	4	26	0	0	0
Source : irb.com Points breakdown: *4 points for a win *2 points for a draw *1 bonus point for a loss by seven points or less *1 bonus point for scoring four or more tries in a match

== Results ==
All kick off times are local.

=== Round 1 ===
3 June 2006
15:00 (UTC+12)

Fiji	17 – 35	Junior All Blacks
Try: A. Ratuva; Caucaunibuca; Con: Bai (2); Pen: Bai		Try: Williams; Blackie; McIntyre; Leo'o; Con: McIntyre (2); Donald; Pen: Donald (2); McIntyre

ANZ National Stadium, Suva
Attendance: 25,000
Referee: Craig Joubert (South Africa)

4 June 2006
15:00 JST (UTC+09)

Japan	16 – 57	Tonga
Try: Oto; Con: Onishi; Pen: Onishi (3)	Report	Try: Fifita (2); Filipine; Hala'ufia; Hehea; Tuʻifua; Tuʻipulotu; Vaikona; Con: Hola (3); J. Taumalolo; Pen: Hola (2); J. Taumalolo

Honjo Stadium, Kitakyushu
Attendance: 8,100
Referee: Bryce Lawrence (New Zealand)

=== Round 2 ===
9 June 2006
20:00 NZST (UTC+12)

Junior All Blacks	56 – 12	Samoa
Try: N. Williams (2); Senio; J. Schwalger; Atiga; Gopperth; Waqaseduadua; Con: Gopperth (6); Pen: Gopperth (3)	Report	Try: Senio; Fe'aunati; Con: Sanft

North Harbour Stadium, Auckland
Attendance: 5,100
Referee: Marius Jonker (South Africa)

10 June 2006
19:30 AEST (UTC+10)

Tonga	24 – 23	Fiji
Try: Hufanga; Vaikona; Lutui; Con: Hola (3); Drop: Hola	Report	Try: Ratuvou; Luveitasau; Con: Bai (2); Pen: Bai (3)

Bluetongue Central Coast Stadium, Gosford
Attendance: 3,582
Referee: Craig Joubert (South Africa)

=== Round 3 ===
IRB Reports

17 June 2006
14:00 NZST (UTC+12)

Samoa	53 – 9	Japan
Try: Fa'atau; Farani; Tuilagi; Iosua (2); Lima; Senio (2); Con: Vili (4); Sanft; Pen: Vili	Report	Pen: Ando (2); Drop: Ando

Yarrow Stadium, New Plymouth
Attendance: 4,200
Referee: Matt Goddard (Australia)

17 June 2006
16:30 NZST (UTC+12)

Junior All Blacks	38 – 10	Tonga
Try: Tuitavake; Waqaseduadua; Gopperth (2); McIntyre; Con: Gopperth; McIntyre; Pen: Gopperth (3)	Report	Try: Lutui; Con: Hola; Pen: Hola

Yarrow Stadium, New Plymouth
Attendance: 4,200
Referee: Wayne Barnes (England)

=== Round 4 ===
IRB Reports

24 June 2006
14:30 NZST (UTC+12)

Junior All Blacks	38 – 8	Japan
Try: Tuitavake (3); Ralph (2); McIntyre; Con: McIntyre (4)	Report	Try: Miyake; Pen: Ikeda

Carisbrook, Dunedin
Attendance: 3,500
Referee: Christophe Berdos (France)

24 June 2006
15:00 (UTC+12)

Fiji	23 – 20	Samoa
Try: Ligairi (2); Con: Bai (2); Pen: Bai (3)	Report	Try: Farani; Fuimaono-Sapolu; Sititi; Con: Crichton; Pen: Crichton

ANZ National Stadium, Suva
Attendance: 7,000
Referee: Wayne Barnes (England)

=== Round 5 ===
IRB Reports

1 July 2006
19:30 AEST (UTC+10)

Tonga	0 – 36	Samoa
	Report	Try: An. Tuilagi (2); M. Schwalger; C. Johnston; Fa'atau; Con: Crichton (4); Pen: Crichton

Bluetongue Central Coast Stadium, Gosford
Attendance: 5,172
Referee: Christophe Berdos (France)

1 July 2006
19:00 JST (UTC+09)

Japan	15 – 29	Fiji
Try: Takei; O'Reilly; Con: Ando; Pen: Ando	Report	Try: Ratuvou; Leawere; Doviverata; Qera; Con: Bai (2); Ruivadra; Pen: Bai

Nagai Stadium, Osaka
Attendance: 5,263
Referee: Wayne Barnes (England)

== Top scorers ==
=== Top points scorers ===
Rank	Player	Team	Points
1	James Gopperth	Junior All Blacks	47
2	Seremaia Bai	Fiji	40
3	Cameron McIntyre	Junior All Blacks	32
4	Pierre Hola	Tonga	31
5	Anthony Tuitavake	Junior All Blacks	20
6	Loki Crichton	Samoa	16
7	John Senio	Samoa	15
7	Anitele'a Tuilagi	Samoa	15
7	Nick Williams	Junior All Blacks	15
10	Eiji Ando	Japan	14

Source: irb.com

=== Top try scorers ===
Rank	Player	Team	Tries
1	Anthony Tuitavake	Junior All Blacks	4
2	James Gopperth	Junior All Blacks	3
2	Cameron McIntyre	Junior All Blacks	3
2	John Senio	Samoa	3
2	Anitele'a Tuilagi	Samoa	3
2	Nick Williams	Junior All Blacks	3
7	10 players		2
17	27 players, Penalty try		1

Source: irb.com

== See also ==
- 2006 IRB Nations Cup
- Pacific Tri-Nations
