= 2006 Super 14 final =

Men's rugby union club competition

Crusaders	Hurricanes
19	12
- Date: 27 May 2006
- Venue: Jade Stadium, Christchurch

Live Broadcast
- Broadcast: SKY Sports

The final of the 2006 Super 14 season, a rugby union competition in the Southern Hemisphere, took place on 27 May 2006 at Jade Stadium in Christchurch, New Zealand. The match was won by the Crusaders 19 points to 12 over the visiting Wellington-based side, the Hurricanes. The match featured low-lying sea fog which prevented many in the crowd, as well as the television cameras and commentators, from seeing the action. The match had one try, to Crusaders' centre, Casey Laulala which was scored in the second half. The match has been nicknamed the "Gorillas in the Mist", after the film of the same name.

== Road to the Final ==
Final Standings
Pos	Team	W	D	L	PD	BP	Pts
1	Crusaders	11	1	1	+202	5	51
2	Hurricanes	10	0	3	+102	7	47
3	Waratahs	9	0	4	+170	9	45
4	Bulls	7	1	5	+65	7	38
5	Sharks	7	0	6	+64	10	38
6	Brumbies	8	1	4	+57	4	38
7	Chiefs	7	1	5	+27	6	36
8	Blues	6	0	7	−54	5	29
9	Highlanders	6	0	7	−48	3	27
10	Cheetahs	5	0	8	−95	7	27
11	Stormers	4	1	8	−71	5	23
12	Reds	4	0	9	−80	6	22
13	Cats	2	1	10	−185	5	15
14	Force	1	2	10	−150	4	12

The Crusaders finished top of the table, following a strong season at home and only one loss, away to the Stormers in Cape Town, which ended their 17-game winning streak. They also had a drawn match in Perth against soon-to-be wooden spooners, the Western Force.

Semi-finals
2	Hurricanes	16
3	Waratahs	14
1	Crusaders	35
4	Bulls	15

Final
1	Crusaders	19
2	Hurricanes	12

The Hurricanes made the final after back-to-back wins over the Waratahs in round 14, in Sydney, and then the first semi-final, played in Wellington. The Hurricanes finished second on the table, losing only three matches, in the round robin, to the Cheetahs, the Crusaders and the Brumbies. The home semi-final was the first time the Hurricanes franchise hosted a playoffs match.

=== Pre-game ===
The game was expected to be centred on the defence of both sides. The Hurricanes entered the final with an average points-against of 15 against New Zealand sides, the Crusaders were slightly better, with 14. The weather was not building up to be a huge factor, with clouds and rain forecast. The Crusaders had finished the 2006 season at the top of the ladder, and defeated the Bulls to claim the home-final as they were the highest ranked side. The Hurricanes finished the season in second position, and defeated the New South Wales Waratahs to meet the Crusaders in the final.

The Crusaders went into the match with no reserve scrum-half after Andy Ellis went off injured against the Bulls the week before. This meant if starting half Kevin Senio was injured, Cameron McIntyre would come on and Dan Carter would move to scrum-half.

== Conditions ==
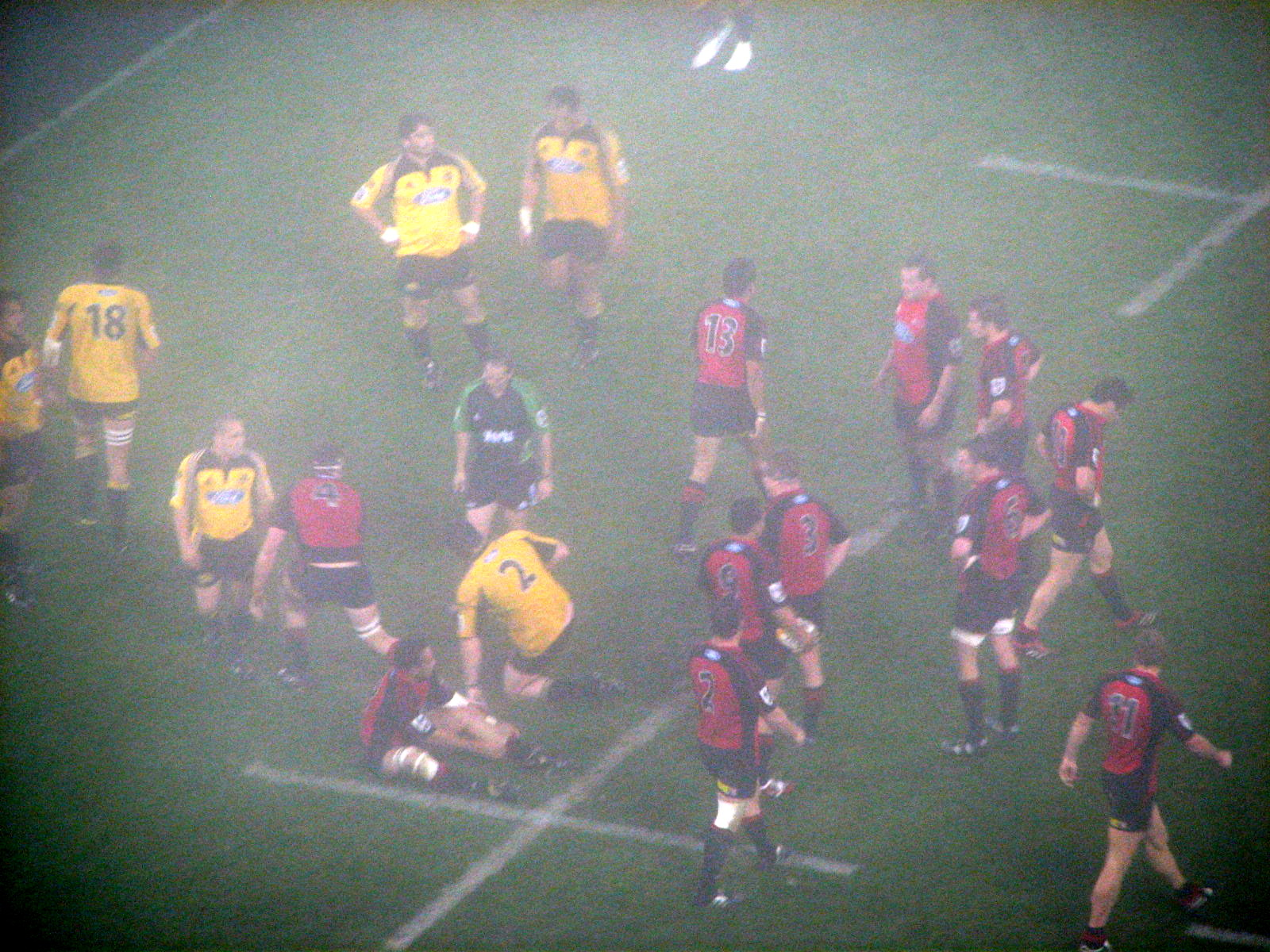
The fog during the match

About an hour before kick-off at Jade Stadium, an unusually thick fog floated over the stadium. The players and officials were asked whether they wanted to persist with the game, with both parties agreeing that the match should go on, although some speculated it might be pushed over to Sunday. As the sides ran out onto the field the players almost disappeared into the mist. The commentary box could not make out anything on the opposite side of the field from where they were. This forced a commentary split, with the sideline commentator taking up the duties when the play was on the opposite side to the commentary box. Some of the television footage was relatively clear with many camera angles and positions different from a normal game broadcast, though many thought they could have done better with more cameras repositioned to the far side of the field.

The poor visibility prevented much free-flowing play, as players struggled to see one another. Bombs and high kicks created havoc for both teams, with both back lines making unusual mistakes. There were many examples of the ball suddenly appearing below the hanging mist, making it difficult to field many kicks. Overall the crowd at Jade Stadium had a poor view of the match, with most of the south stand turning around to watch the match on the stadium's big-screen. The Sky Sports commentators saw many patrons in the upper levels rushing home or to other establishments to watch coverage on television. Officials admitted that the match would have been postponed if the fog had been any thicker.

== Match ==
=== First half ===
In one of the opening exchanges, Crusaders wing Rico Gear dropped the ball from a high kick, the resulting play lead to a Hurricanes penalty. David Holwell missed the penalty attempt, it being taken from 30m out and near the touchline. The Hurricanes scored first through a long range Piri Weepu penalty goal in the 12th minute. Dan Carter had an opportunity to level the scores with a penalty kick, but missed as well. Carter did make two penalties, leaving the half time score 6–3 in favour of the home side. Weepu went down several times in the first half and was momentarily knocked out.

=== Second half ===
Holwell tied the match up four minutes after the interval, but Carter put the Crusaders back in front with a penalty two minutes later. Holwell was then substituted for Jimmy Gopperth, in what may have been Holwell's final first-class match. Gopperth kicked the Hurricanes' third penalty, once again evening up the scores. The Crusaders struck back though, with a try to Casey Laulala near the right hand upright. Carter converted, put the Crusaders out to a 16–9 lead. Carter then extended the lead out to 19–9 on the 69 minute mark, before Gopperth scored a penalty with ten minutes remaining. The match ended with the Hurricanes attempting to run it out from their own 22, needing a converted try. Reuben Thorne forced a turnover though, and hooker Corey Flynn kicked the ball into touch for the Crusaders' sixth Super rugby title, and first Super 14 title.

== Criticism ==
Many after the match criticised the New Zealand Rugby Union (NZRU) and the Canterbury Rugby Football Union (CRFU) for allowing the match to be played in such poor conditions. Former All Black first five-eighth, Grant Fox, defended the decision, citing that the fog came in around 6:30 p.m., around one hour before kick-off, making it a logistical nightmare to attempt to postpone it.

The decision to allow Weepu to continue playing (after being knocked out) also drew criticism from medical experts, including former All Blacks' doctor, John Mayhew. "Get the player off. Assume that his day is over and go on from there. Whether it's a test match or Super 14 final or a rugby league game", Mayhew told NZPA. Hurricanes doctor, Ian Murphy said on Tuesday 30 May that he was unaware that Weepu was knocked out. "By the time I got to Piri out on the field he was conscious and I could not fault him in terms of his responses to my concussion-related questions" said Murphy. Weepu revealed after the match that he was suffering from amnesia, and could recall very little about the final.

== Post-match "handbag incident" ==
Former All Black captain Tana Umaga and Chris Masoe were involved in an altercation after the final in The Jolly Poacher, a bar in Christchurch. Masoe tripped over a male patron's feet whilst walking in the bar. Umaga then intervened, by taking Masoe aside and began hitting him with a nearby women's handbag. The mobile phone inside the bag was broken in the process.

After the incident, Masoe was fined NZ$3000 by the NZRU and it was reported that he punched another patron at the bar. All Black coach, Graham Henry said that he believes that the All Black players may have been discussing Umaga's technique. Umaga received no fine from the NZRU, but replaced the broken phone. The handbag that was used by Umaga was placed on the TradeMe auction website after the event, and at the close of bidding was sold for NZ$22,750.

The incident was later parodied by the Australian television network, Seven, in the buildup for the 2006 Tri Nations Series, in a television commercial. The commercial featured the All Blacks performing the haka, with digitally enhanced handbags over their shoulders. New Zealand officials later complained about the ad, saying that it was insensitive to Umaga.

== Match details ==
27 May 2006

Crusaders	19–12	Hurricanes
Try: Laulala 62' c Con: Carter (1/1); Pen: Carter (4) 32', 37', 46', 69'	Report	Pen: Weepu 14'; Holwell 44'; Gopperth (2) 56', 70'

Jade Stadium, Christchurch
Attendance: 36,500
Referee: Jonathan Kaplan (South Africa)

Crusaders	Hurricanes

Crusaders:
FB	15	Leon MacDonald
RW	14	Rico Gear
OC	13	Casey Laulala
IC	12	Aaron Mauger
LW	11	Scott Hamilton
FH	10	Dan Carter
SH	9	Kevin Senio
N8	8	Mose Tuiali'i
OF	7	Richie McCaw (c)
BF	6	Reuben Thorne
RL	5	Ross Filipo
LL	4	Chris Jack
TP	3	Greg Somerville
HK	2	Corey Flynn
LP	1	Wyatt Crockett
Substitutes:
HK	16	Tone Kopelani
PR	17	Campbell Johnstone
FL	18	Johnny Leo'o
FL	19	Tanerau Latimer
FH	20	Stephen Brett
CE	21	Cameron McIntyre
CE	22	Caleb Ralph
Coach:
(New Zealand) Robbie Deans

Hurricanes:
FB	15	Isaia Toeava
RW	14	Lome Fa'atau
OC	13	Ma'a Nonu
IC	12	Tana Umaga
LW	11	Shannon Paku
FH	10	David Holwell
SH	9	Piri Weepu
N8	8	Rodney So'oialo (c)
OF	7	Chris Masoe
BF	6	Jerry Collins
RL	5	Jason Eaton
LL	4	Paul Tito
TP	3	Neemia Tialata
HK	2	Andrew Hore
LP	1	John Schwalger
Substitutions:
HK	16	Luke Mahoney
PR	17	Joe McDonnell
LK	18	Luke Andrews
N8	19	Thomas Waldrom
SH	20	Brendan Haami
FH	21	Jimmy Gopperth
CE	22	Tamati Ellison
Coach:
(New Zealand) Colin Cooper

Preceded by 2005 Super 12 Final	Super 14 Final; 2006	Succeeded by 2007 Super 14 Final
