= Blair Stewart =

Blair Stewart may refer to:

- Blair Stewart (ice hockey) (born 1953), Canadian ice hockey player
- Blair Stewart (rugby union) (born 1983), New Zealand rugby union player
- Blair Stewart-Wilson (1929–2011), equerry to Her Majesty the Queen
