= Taumalolo =

Taumalolo is a Tongan surname. Notable people with the surname include:

- Jason Taumalolo (born 1993), New Zealand rugby league player
- Josh Taumalolo (born 1976), rugby union player
- Sona Taumalolo (born 1981), New Zealand rugby union player
