= Jacob Kennedy =

Jacob Kennedy may refer to:

- Jake Bugg, née Jacob Kennedy
- Jacob Kennedy (rugby union), 2006 Air New Zealand Cup
