= Rodley =

Rodley may refer to:

- Rodley (car), a British microcar built between 1954 and 1956

== Places ==
- Rodley, West Yorkshire, a village in West Yorkshire, England
- Rodley, Gloucestershire, a village in Gloucestershire, England

== People ==
- J. Ellis Rodley (1852–1919), President of the Chico, California Board of Trustees, (1897–1899)
- James Rodley (born 1985), New Zealand rugby union player
- Nigel Rodley (1941–2017), British lawyer and academic
- Chris Rodley, film-maker and co-author of Lynch on Lynch
