= Greg Zampach =

NZ rugby union player (born 1976)

- Full name: Gregory Joseph Zampach
- Born: 30 March 1976 (age 50)
- School: St Bede's College
- University: University of Otago

Rugby union career
- Position: Wing
Provincial / State sides
Years	Team	Apps	(Points)
2006–07	Otago	11	(25)
2010–11	North Otago	11	(35)
Super Rugby
Years	Team	Apps	(Points)
2007	Highlanders	2	(0)

Gregory Joseph Zampach (born 30 March 1976) is a New Zealand former professional rugby union player.

Hailing from Westport in the West Coast region, Zampach is the son of Buller rugby player Joe Zampach and was educated at Christchurch's St Bede's College. He went on to study at the University of Otago and played his early senior rugby with the Taieri club outside Dunedin.

Zampach didn't play first-class rugby until the age of 30 due to recurring injuries, making his debut for Otago in 2006. He featured twice for the Highlanders in the 2007 Super 14 season, starting on the left wing in back to back matches in South Africa against the Lions and Sharks, filling in for Viliame Waqaseduadua. Following another long injury layoff, Zampach joined North Otago in 2010, scoring seven tries in his first season.
