= Brendon Leonard =

New Zealand rugby union player

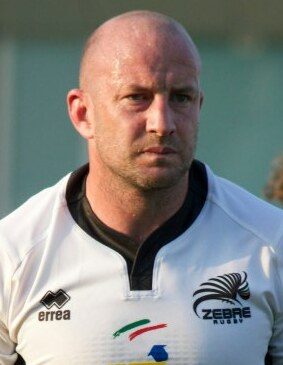
- Born: Brendon Grant Leonard; 16 April 1985 (age 41) Morrinsville, New Zealand
- Height: 1.82 m (6 ft 0 in)
- Weight: 91 kg (14 st 5 lb)
- School: Matamata College
- University: Waikato Institute of Technology
- Notable relative: Ron Leonard (father)

Rugby union career
- Position: Scrum-half
- Current team: Taranaki
Amateur team(s)
Years	Team	Apps	(Points)
2003–	Morrinsville Sports		
Senior career
Years	Team	Apps	(Points)
2005–2013	Waikato	64	(80)
2007–2013	Chiefs	73	(90)
2013–2015	Zebre	47	(30)
2015–2017	Ospreys	43	(25)
2018	Taranaki	4	(0)
- Correct as of 9 May 2015
International career
Years	Team	Apps	(Points)
2007–2013	New Zealand	13	(10)
- Correct as of 5 November 2012

Brendon Leonard (born 16 April 1985) is a New Zealand rugby union footballer.

Leonard plays half-back and made his provincial debut for Waikato in the 2005 National Provincial Championship. He was in the Chiefs wider training group for the 2006 Super 14. After playing for Waikato in their championship winning 2006 Air New Zealand Cup side, Leonard was selected for the Chiefs in the 2007 Super 14. Leonard had a successful Super 14 where he played for Byron Kelleher who missed the first seven rounds of the competition to participate in the All Blacks reconditioning programme. Following the 2007 Super 14 he was selected for the All Blacks squad for the 2007 mid-year Tests and 2007 Tri-Nations. He was one of only two uncapped players named in the squad, and All Blacks coach Graham Henry said of Leonard's selection "Brendon [Leonard] has been the best attacking scrum-half in the Super 14 this season and has forced his way into the side based on form." He made his Test debut against France at Eden Park on 2 June 2007. He came on as a substitute for Piri Weepu in the 64th minute of the All Blacks 42–11 victory. He then scored his first Test try against South Africa on 14 July 2007. On 12 August 2013, Leonard left New Zealand as he signed for new Italy franchise Zebre in the Pro12 from the 2013–14 season. On 22 January it was announced Leonard had signed for the Ospreys, mainly to provide experienced cover for Welsh international Rhys Webb during the 2015 Rugby World Cup.
