= Aayden Clarke =

New Zealand rugby union player

- Born: 11 August 1981 (age 45) Wairoa, New Zealand
- Height: 1.87 m (6 ft 2 in)
- Weight: 95 kg (209 lb)
- School: Wairoa College
- University: Massey University
- Occupation(s): Regional Personal Development Manager (Pacific Rugby Players)

Rugby union career
- Position: First five-eighth
- Current team: Linwood
Amateur team(s)
Years	Team	Apps	(Points)
- Napier Pirates
Senior career
Years	Team	Apps	(Points)
2009–10	Kintetsu Liners	46	
Provincial / State sides
Years	Team	Apps	(Points)
2003–09	Hawkes Bay	46	
-	Rugby Football Union		
International career
Years	Team	Apps	(Points)
- New Zealand Rugby Schools

Aayden Clarke (born 11 August 1981) is a former New Zealand rugby union player who notably played for Hawke's Bay Magpies in the National Provincial Championship. He also had stints for Prato Cavalieri in Italy and the Kintetsu Liners in Japan. His position of choice was first five-eighth and goal kicker.

Post rugby career Clarke founded and online sports clothing company, Plussix4 (later renamed Kinetik) that specialised in compression and base layer clothing for athletes. This brand traded globally while based out of New Zealand. Clarke sold the company in 2015.

Clarke began a management career in Tertiary education at Eastern Institute of Technology once retiring from rugby in 2012 at the age of 31. His role management role focused on Trades and Technology.

Clarke had an involvement during his rugby playing career with the New Zealand Rugby Players Association (NZRPA) as a player rep and then returned later in a part-time Pole as Personal Development Manager for his old team the Hawkes Bay Magpies in 2015.

He is a current board member of Sport Hawke's Bay and an active contributor to Rangatahi and economic development groups in Ngati Kahungunu Iwi.
