= Charles Baxter (rugby union) =

New Zealand rugby union player

- Born: 24 June 1981 (age 45)
- Height: 1.78 m (5 ft 10 in)
- Weight: 82 kg (181 lb; 12 st 13 lb)
- School: Tauranga Boys' College

Rugby union career
- Position: Wing
Provincial / State sides
| Years | Team | Apps | (Points) |
| 2001–2006 | Bay of Plenty | | |
National sevens team
| Years | Team | | Comps |
| 2002–2009 | New Zealand | | |

Charles Baxter (born 24 June 1981) is a former New Zealand rugby union player. He played for the All Blacks Sevens and made his debut in 2002.

In 2011 he was selected as the Bay of Plenty sevens coach.
