= Ben Meyer (rugby union) =

- Full name: Benjamin Mark Meyer

Rugby union career
- Position: Halfback
Provincial / State sides
Years	Team	Apps	(Points)
1997–99	North Harbour	7	(0)
2000	Auckland	7	(5)
2001	Northland	10	(15)
2003–05	North Harbour	21	(10)
2006	Counties Manukau	9	(10)
Super Rugby
Years	Team	Apps	(Points)
2000–05	Blues	11	(0)

Benjamin Mark Meyer (born 1977) is a New Zealand former professional rugby union player.

== Rugby career ==
A halfback, Meyer was a New Zealand Universities representative captain, called upon intermittently to play as a halfback for the Blues between 2000 and 2005. He played his provincial rugby with North Harbour, Auckland, Northland and Counties Manukau, captaining the latter in the 2006 season. In 2007, Meyer left New Zealand to play for Edinburgh and scored a try on his debut against Tonga.

Meyer was appointed Head of High Performance for Auckland Rugby Union in 2017.
