= Jake Paringatai =

New Zealand rugby union player (born 1980)

- Born: 13 April 1980 (age 46) Paraparaumu, New Zealand
- Height: 1.91 m (6 ft 3 in)
- Weight: 108 kg (17 st 0 lb)
- School: Kāpiti College

Rugby union career
- Position: Loose forward
Senior career
Years	Team	Apps	(Points)
2007–08	Munster	2	(0)
2009–12	Fukuoka Sanix Blues	40	(10)
- Correct as of 19
Provincial / State sides
Years	Team	Apps	(Points)
2003–07, 2013	Northland	63	(30)
2014-15	Poverty Bay		
Super Rugby
Years	Team	Apps	(Points)
2007	Crusaders	4	(0)
2013	Highlanders	6	(0)
International career
Years	Team	Apps	(Points)
2004–06	Maori All Blacks	5	(5)
- Correct as of 18 June 2006

Jake Paringatai (born 13 April 1980) Paringatai was a New Zealand rugby union loose forward who played at provincial, Super Rugby, and international representative levels. He represented Northland, the Highlanders, and the Crusaders, and earned selection for the Māori All Blacks between 2004 and 2006. His career also included overseas rugby in Italy, Ireland and Japan. Highlanders and the Crusaders.

Paringatai also formally represented Northland, Munster and Fukuoka Sanix Blues.

.
