= Mark Burman =

New Zealand rugby union footballer (born 1984)

- Full name: Mark John Burman
- Born: 10 August 1984 (age 42)

Rugby union career
- Position: Lock
Provincial / State sides
Years	Team	Apps	(Points)
2005–08	Waikato	28	(5)
2009	Bay of Plenty	12	(0)
2010–11	Northland	22	(10)
Super Rugby
Years	Team	Apps	(Points)
2009	Chiefs	1	(0)

Mark John Burman (born 10 August 1984) is a New Zealand former professional rugby union player.

Burman grew up in Taupiri and was a mobile lock, also capable of playing in the back-row.

Debuting for Waikato in 2005, Burman came back from a serious knee injury in 2008 to earn a Chiefs call up during the 2009 Super 14 season. He appeared for the Chiefs in their win over the Western Force at Waikato Stadium, but was subsequently omitted from Waikato's squad for the 2009 Air New Zealand Cup campaign and played the season out on loan at the Bay of Plenty. His Bay of Plenty appearances were mostly off the bench, with John Moore and Culum Retallick ahead of him in the pecking order. He played at Northland in 2010 and 2011.

Burman competed in Italian rugby from 2009 to 2012, with Rovigo and Mogliano. He then relocated to Australia and helped Lake Macquarie reach the Hunter Rugby semi-finals for the first time in 2012.
