= Jonathan Poff =

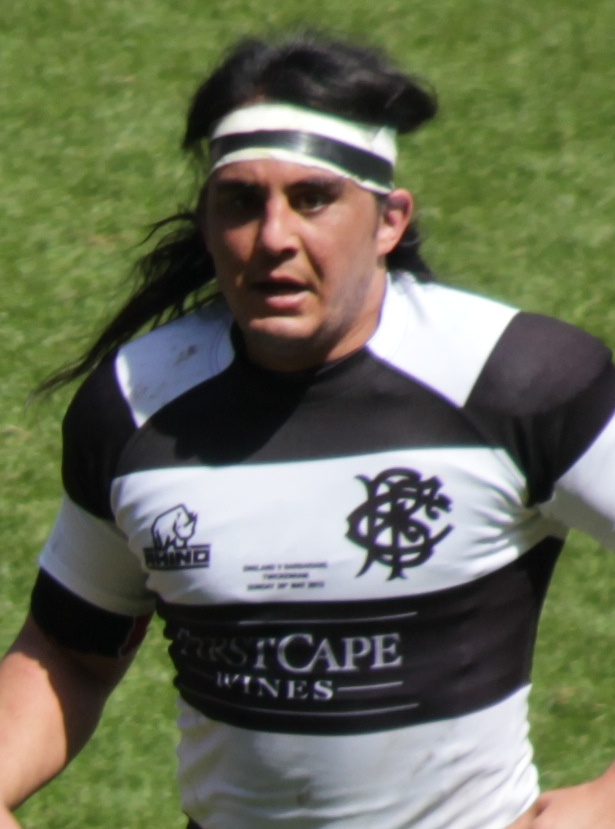
- Born: 27 September 1983 (age 43) Christchurch, New Zealand
- Height: 1.85 m (6 ft 1 in)
- Weight: 104 kg (16 st 5 lb)

Rugby union career
- Position: Loose forward
Senior career
Years	Team	Apps	(Points)
2011–2013	Wasps	43	(5)
Provincial / State sides
Years	Team	Apps	(Points)
2006–2011	Tasman	61	(15)
- Correct as of 17 October 2020
Super Rugby
Years	Team	Apps	(Points)
2009–2011	Crusaders	18	(5)

Jonathan Poff (born 27 September 1983 in Christchurch, New Zealand) was a rugby union player who played for the London Wasps in the Aviva Premiership. Prior to joining Wasps, he played for Tasman in the ITM Cup competition in New Zealand and represented the Crusaders in Super Rugby.

== Career ==
Poff, who grew up Cheviot, New Zealand, was selected for the NZ Secondary Schools in 2002 and in 2004 played in the NZ Colts team winning the cup in Scotland. In 2007 Poff made the Crusaders squad, however got no game time. In 2009 he became the 139th Crusader against the Stormers. His first start was against the Lions in South Africa when he played the full eighty minutes. He was unlucky to have not received more game time in the 2009 campaign. Poff was reselected for the Crusaders 2010 and resigned for Tasman for two more years. It was announced on 18 May 2011 that Poff was joining Aviva Premiership side London Wasps for the 2011–12 season where, on debut, he secured the man of the match award in the 20–15 victory over Saracens F.C.
