= Andrew van der Heijden =

- Born: Andrew van der Heijden; 4 March 1984 (age 42) Auckland, New Zealand
- Height: 2.00 m (6 ft 6 1/2 in)
- Weight: 115 kg (18 st 2 lb)

Rugby union career
- Position: Lock
Senior career
Years	Team	Apps	(Points)
2006–08	Counties Manukau	46	(15)
2009–10	Auckland	26	(0)
2011–12	Newcastle	14	(0)
2012	Auckland	8	(0)
- Correct as of 7 July 2014
Super Rugby
Years	Team	Apps	(Points)
2007	Chiefs	1	(0)
2009–10 & 2012	Blues	5	(0)
- Correct as of 27 September 2012

Andrew Van der Heijden, born 4 March 1984 is a Rugby union footballer. He plays as a lock. He represents Auckland in the ITM Cup and has played some matches in the Blues in Super Rugby.
