= Nathan Kemp =

- Full name: Nathan Robert Kemp
- Born: 19 January 1979 (age 47)
- School: St Peter's College

Rugby union career
- Position: Hooker
Provincial / State sides
Years	Team	Apps	(Points)
2003–04	Auckland	9	(10)
2005–06	Manawatu	18	(10)
Super Rugby
Years	Team	Apps	(Points)
2004	Blues	2	(0)

Nathan Robert Kemp (born 19 January 1979) is a New Zealand former professional rugby union player.

== Rugby career ==
A product of St Peter's College, Auckland, Kemp played senior rugby for Ponsonby straight out of school and later captained the club during a period of dominance in the Gallaher Shield.

Kemp won an NPC title in his first year with Auckland in 2003 and the following season made two Super 12 appearances for the Blues, both off the bench. After two years at Auckland, Kemp made the decision to move on, having received limited opportunities behind preferred hookers Keven Mealamu and Derren Witcombe.

In 2005, Kemp captained Manawatu in a tour match against the British and Irish Lions.

Kemp earned a place on the Hurricanes development roster while at Manawatu, but opted to play professional rugby in the United Kingdom, where he had stints with the Cornish Pirates and Jersey, as well as a player-coach role with Wimbledon. He returned to New Zealand in 2015 and took up a position as director of rugby for Ponsonby.
