= Miah Nikora =

NZ rugby union player

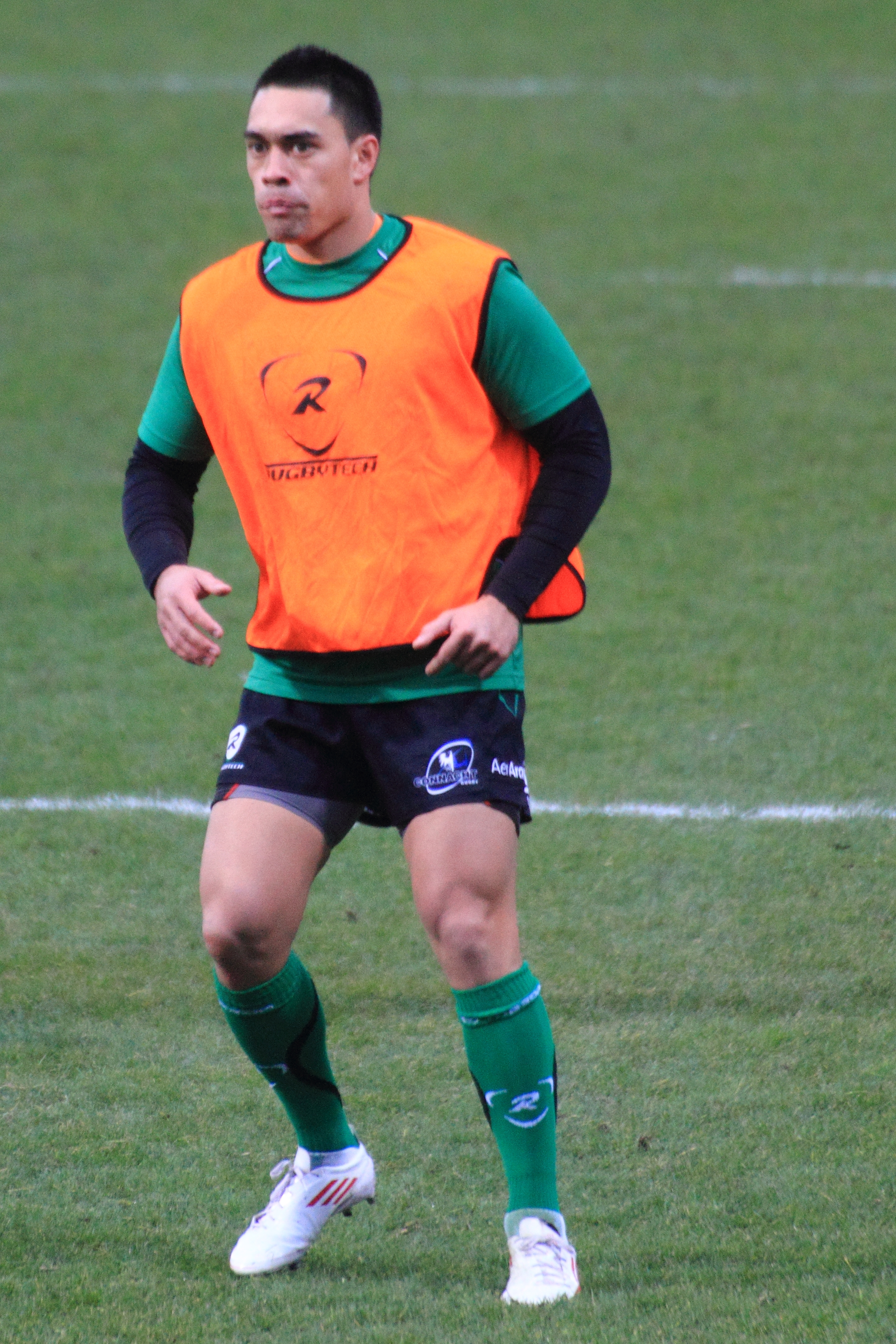
- Born: 28 April 1985 (age 41) Gisborne, New Zealand
- Height: 1.78 m (5 ft 10 in)
- Weight: 87 kg (192 lb)
- School: Gisborne Boys' High School

Rugby union career
- Position(s): Fly-half, Fullback
- Current team: Petrarca
Provincial / State sides
Years	Team	Apps	(Points)
2006–2007	Taranaki	8	(58)
2007–2008	Wellington	5	(3)
2008–2009	Tasman	11	(84)
2009–2015	Connacht	82	(282)
- Correct as of 11 April 2015
Super Rugby
Years	Team	Apps	(Points)
2007–2008	Hurricanes	0	(0)
International career
Years	Team	Apps	(Points)
- NZ Schools
–	NZ Under 19s		
–	NZ Under 21s		

Miah Nikora (born 28 April 1985 in Gisborne, New Zealand) is a professional rugby union player and head coach from New Zealand. He currently is head coach of Civil Projects Solutions Poverty Bay senior rugby club. He primarily played at fly-half, though he has also played at fullback. Nikora formerly played for the Irish provincial team Connacht in the Pro14.

Nikora is a former New Zealand Under-21, Under-19 and Secondary Schools representative. He first came to prominence playing in the Gisborne Boys' High School First XV. Nikora became eligible to play for Ireland from the end of the 2011–12 season under the three-year residency rule.

== Club career ==
=== Career in New Zealand ===
After starting out at Poverty Bay he moved to Wellington. In 2006 Nikora was loaned by Wellington to Tasman Rugby Union for two years, at the completion of which Tasman was planning to sign Nikora for a further period. However, a condition in the loan agreement stated that if either Jimmy Gopperth or Tamati Ellison got injured or made the All Blacks for the 2007 Rugby World Cup, Wellington could recall Nikora.

During Round Two of the 2006 Air New Zealand Cup, Tamati Ellison was injured and Nikora was drafted back to Wellington. He was then named in the Hurricanes' wider training group for the 2007 Super 14.

=== Connacht ===
Nikora joined Irish side Connacht for the start of the 2009–10 season to provide competition for Ian Keatley at fly-half.

Nikora made 11 appearances in his debut league campaign, At European level, Nikora played in six of Connacht's eight 2009–10 Challenge Cup games as they reached the semi-finals,.

In the 2010–11 season a new coach, Eric Elwood. Nikora played 16 games in the 2010–11 Celtic League In the 2010–11 European Challenge Cup, Nikora started three of Connacht's six games and featured from the bench in another two.

In the following season Nikora competed with Niall O'Connor for the number 10 jersey, as Keatley left Connacht to join Munster. Nikora played in ten 2011–12 Pro12 games, starting eight of these and scoring 75 points. In Europe, the season marked Connacht's first time to play in the Heineken Cup, the highest level of European rugby. Nikora played in three games in the 2011–12 Heineken Cup, starting twice.

The 2012–13 season saw former Scotland international fly-half Dan Parks join Connacht, limiting Nikora's role in the side. Nikora came on as a replacement in four 2012–13 Heineken Cup games, while in the 2012–13 Pro12, he appeared 12 times.

The following season was also a frustrating one for Nikora. Eric Elwood departed the province to be replaced by Pat Lam, but in September 2013, before he had played his first match of the season, Nikora picked up a shoulder injury. It later emerged that the shoulder would require surgery and could mean missing up to five months of the season. Nikora played no part in the 2013–14 Heineken Cup, and ultimately did not play in the 2013–14 Pro12 until 23 February 2014 against Zebre, when he came on as a replacement. Nikora made four more appearances from the bench and three starts before the end of the season.

== See also ==
- Pro14
- Connacht Rugby
- Super Rugby
- 2007 Super 14
- Hurricanes
- Air New Zealand Cup
- 2006 Air New Zealand Cup Results
- 2006 Air New Zealand Cup Leading Points Scorers
- Wellington Rugby Football Union
- Taranaki Rugby Union
- Rugby Union
