= Ryan Bambry =

New Zealand rugby union player

- Born: 17 September 1982 (age 44)
- Height: 1.8 m (5 ft 11 in)
- Weight: 85 kg (13 st 5 lb)

Rugby union career
- Position: Fly-half
Senior career
Years	Team	Apps	(Points)
–	Otago		
2006	Highlanders		

Ryan Bambry is a New Zealand rugby union player who has played for Otago and the Highlanders. His usual position is fly-half.
