= Lote Raikabula =

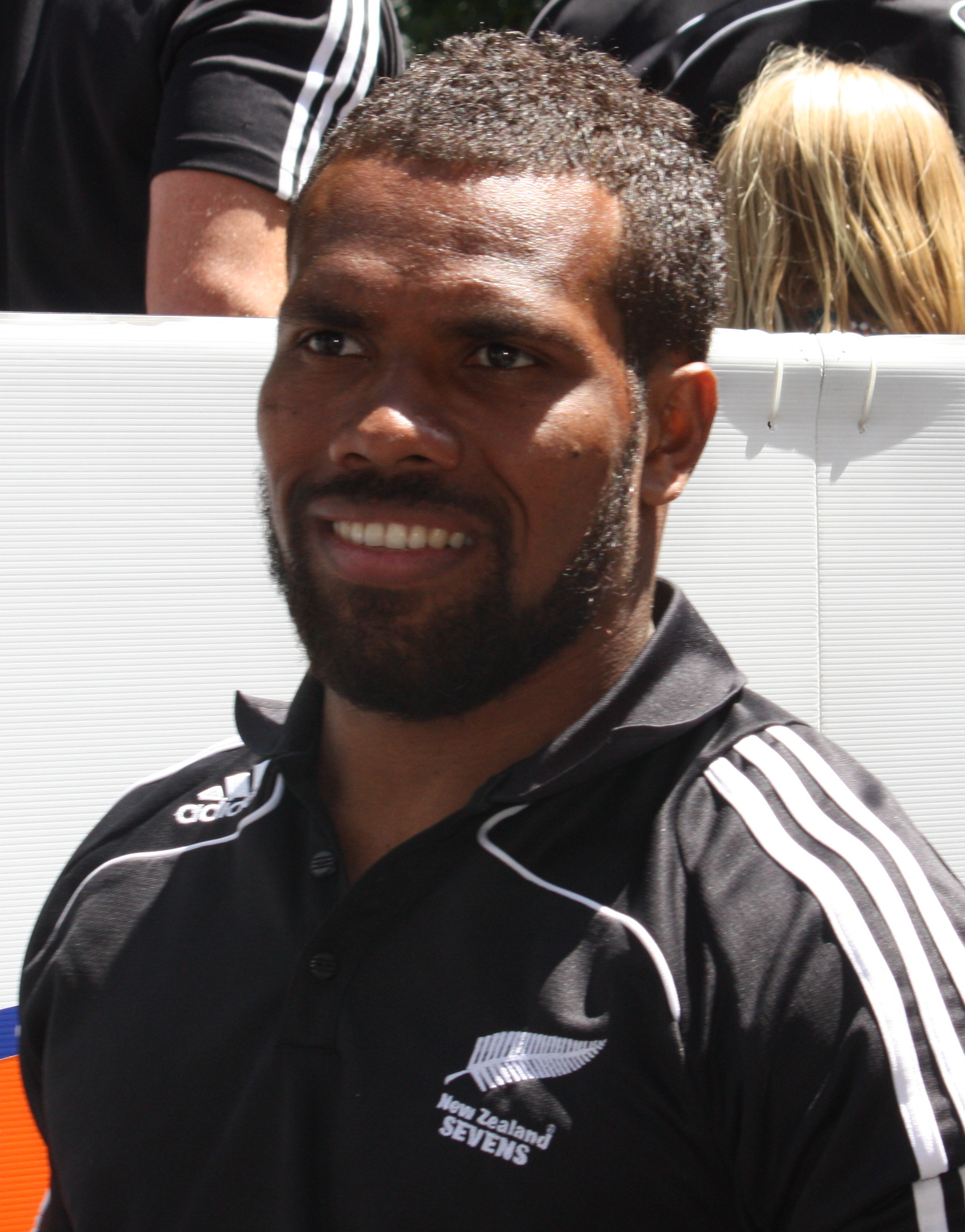
- Born: Lote Raikabula; 31 July 1983 (age 43) Fiji
- Height: 1.93 m (6 ft 4 in)
- Weight: 87 kg (13 st 10 lb; 192 lb)

Rugby union career
- Position: Utility back
Senior career
Years	Team	Apps	(Points)
- Manawatu
International career
Years	Team	Apps	(Points)
2006–2016	New Zealand Sevens		
Medal record
Men's rugby sevens
Representing New Zealand
Commonwealth Games
Gold medal – first place	2006 Melbourne	Team competition
Gold medal – first place	2010 Delhi	Team competition

Lote Raikabula (born 31 July 1983) is a New Zealand rugby player who has played both rugby union and rugby sevens. He used to play for the All Blacks Sevens team in the IRB Sevens World Series and is the Rugby coach for International School of Bangkok. He has played more than 60 tournaments since his debut in 2006, playing in 20 tournament-winning teams. He has five IRB Sevens World Series medals, a Rugby World Cup Sevens title and two Commonwealth Games gold medals.

Raikabula has played rugby union for both Hawkes Bay and Manawatu in the Air New Zealand Cup.

Raikabula has won five IRB Sevens World Series medals, a Rugby World Cup Sevens title, and two Commonwealth Games gold medals.

He played ten years for the New Zealand sevens team from 2006 to 2016, retiring from international rugby shortly before the 2016 Rio Summer Olympics, at the age of 33. He has two sons with his childhood sweetheart.

== Coaching ==
In November 2016 he was appointed as the head coach of Rugby at Trinity College Kandy, Sri Lanka. His services as the head coach of Rugby at Trinity College was discontinued effective from 2 June 2018. He has also coached rugby in Japan.

Lote is currently Head Coach of the Thailand Men's and Women's 7s Team along with being Director of Rugby for the union

== Career highlights ==
- New Zealand Sevens, 2006–2016
- Hawke's Bay 2006, 2007
- East Coast, 2005
- Wellington Sevens, 2002–2005
- Wellington Under 21, 2003
