= Chris Heard =

- Full name: Christopher Leonard Heard
- Born: 11 April 1982 (age 44)
- Height: 194 cm (6 ft 4 in)
- Weight: 115 kg (254 lb)
- School: King's College, Auckland

Rugby union career
- Position: Prop
Provincial / State sides
Years	Team	Apps	(Points)
2003–07	Auckland	26	(15)
Super Rugby
Years	Team	Apps	(Points)
2007	Blues	4	(0)

Christopher Leonard Heard (born 11 April 1982) is a New Zealand former professional rugby union player.

A King's College product, Heard was a NZ Schools representative and joined the Auckland academy for 2001.

Heard, a prop, competed with Auckland from 2003 to 2007. He was a regular in their title-winning 2007 Air New Zealand Cup campaign, although he missed the final to make way for All Black Keven Mealamu. During the 2007 Super 14 season, Heard made four appearances for the Blues, including a match as starting loosehead prop against the Waratahs at Eden Park, where he was amongst their best performers.
