= Dion Bates =

- Born: Dion Bates; 16 July 1981 (age 45) Invercargill, New Zealand
- Height: 1.82 m (6 ft 0 in)
- Weight: 102 kg (16 st 1 lb)

Rugby union career
- Position: Flanker
Senior career
| Years | Team | Apps | (Points) |
| 2006–2012 | Southland | 31 | (5) |

Dion Bates (born 16 July 1981 in Invercargill, New Zealand) is a New Zealand rugby union player who plays as a flanker for the Southland Stags in the Air New Zealand Cup.

He made 31 appearances over the course of his career, scoring one try.
