= James Rodley =

- Born: 20 March 1985 (age 41) Auckland
- Height: 1.76 m (5 ft 9 1/2 in)
- Weight: 85 kg (187 lb; 13.4 st)

Rugby union career
- Position: Halfback
Provincial / State sides
Years	Team	Apps	(Points)
2006	North Harbour		
International career
Years	Team	Apps	(Points)
2007	NZ Māori		

James Rodley (born 20 March 1985, in Auckland) is a rugby union player.

== Rugby career ==
Rodley started playing rugby at the age of five for the East Coast Bays rugby club. The move to the Marist Rugby club in 2006 saw his rugby career take off. Rodley was selected as the second halfback/scrumhalf for the North Harbour NPC Air New Zealand Cup team in 2006, but it wasn't long before he was the starting halfback. The North Harbour Rugby Union NPC team won the Ranfurly Shield in 2006 for the first time in North Harbours history against Canterbury. Rodley was named Rookie of the year 2006.

In early 2007, Rodley participated in a competition with all the Marist clubs from around New Zealand. The North Shore Marist team Rodley plays for won the competition, and rodley was named Marists most valuable player.

May 2007 saw Rodley get selected to go to England to play in the 2007 Churchill Cup for the New Zealand Māori rugby union team. This came after the second halfback, Brendan Haami, injured himself in practice.
