= Blair Feeney =

New Zealand rugby union player

Blair Feeney (born 9 December 1975 in Auckland, New Zealand) is a rugby union player who plays for Counties Manukau in the 2006 Air New Zealand Cup. He played for Counties Manukau between 1996 and 2001, Otago 2002, Viadana 2003–2004 and Newbury 2004–2005.
