= Laurence Corlett =

New Zealand rugby union player (born 1979)

- Full name: Laurence Kenneth Corlett
- Born: 22 June 1979 (age 47) Stratford, New Zealand
- Height: 182 cm (6 ft 0 in)
- Weight: 106 kg (234 lb)
- School: Northland College

Rugby union career
- Position: Hooker
Provincial / State sides
Years	Team	Apps	(Points)
2001–03	Canterbury	10	(0)
2005–12	Taranaki	64	(10)
Super Rugby
Years	Team	Apps	(Points)
2011	Hurricanes	1	(0)

Laurence Kenneth Corlett (born 22 June 1979) is a New Zealand former professional rugby union player.

Born in Stratford, Corlett was Head Boy at Northland College and got his start in provincial rugby with Canterbury, where he served as an understudy to hooker Mark Hammett from 2001 to 2003.

Corlett competed for Taranaki between 2005 and 2012, playing 64 matches. He was involved with the Hurricanes in 2011 and got an opportunity to make his Super Rugby debut against the Crusaders in the final round, when Dane Coles volunteered his spot on the bench. On the eve of his 32nd birthday, Corlett came on as a substitute to become the oldest Hurricanes debutant. He was drafted into the Crusaders squad in 2013 as injury cover, but never took the field.

A former Tukapa premiership-winning coach, Corlett served as CEO of Taranaki rugby from 2020 to 2022.
