= Casey Laulala =

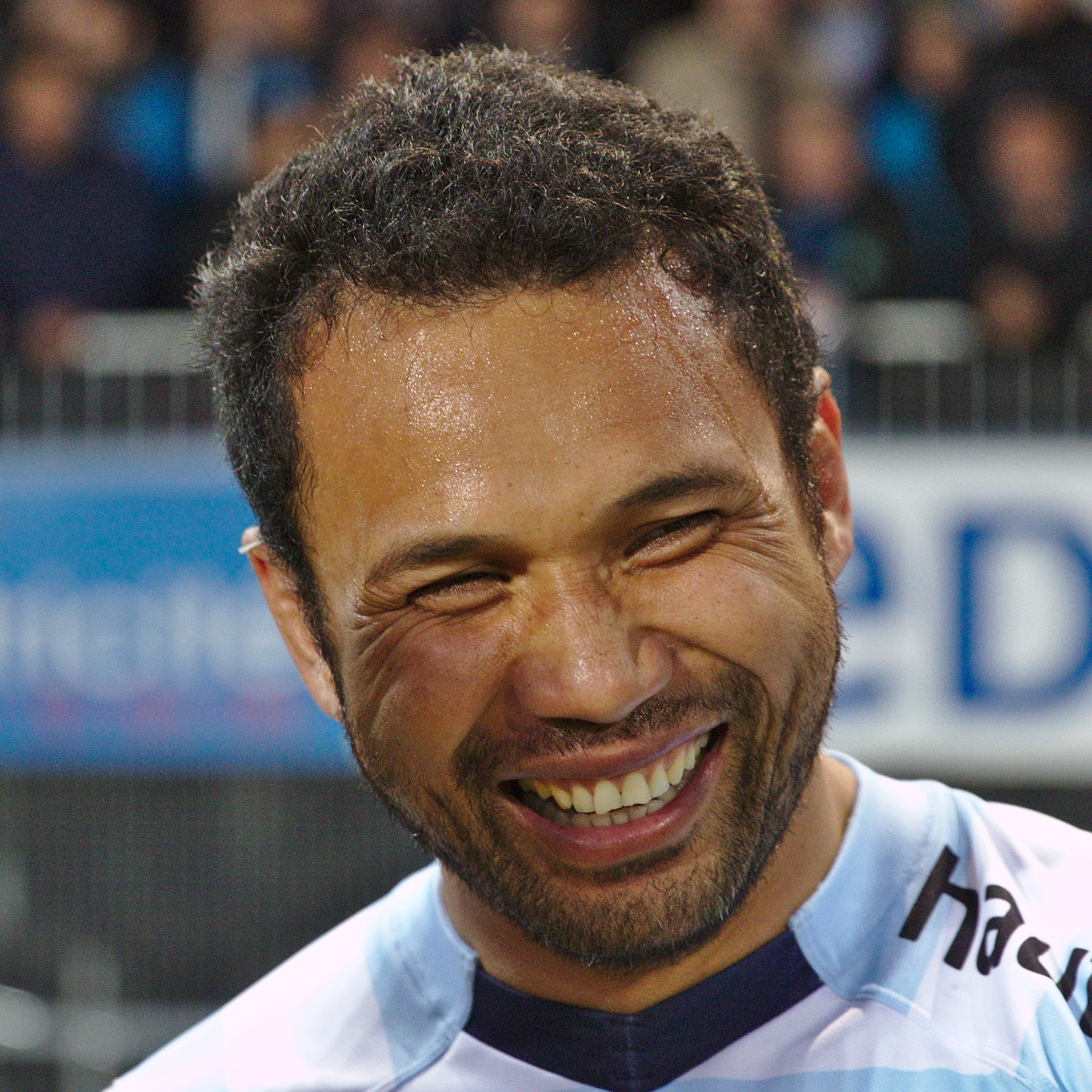
- Laulala in 2015
- Born: Casey Daniel Eti Laulala; 3 May 1982 (age 44) Apia, Samoa
- Height: 1.86 m (6 ft 1 in)
- Weight: 101 kg (15.9 st; 223 lb)
- School: Wesley College, Pukekohe
- Notable relative: Nepo Laulala (brother)

Rugby union career
- Position: Centre
Senior career
Years	Team	Apps	(Points)
2009–2012	Cardiff Blues	65	(75)
2012–2014	Munster	51	(20)
2014–2018	Racing 92	55	(30)
- Correct as of 19 May 2017
Provincial / State sides
Years	Team	Apps	(Points)
2001–2002	Manukau	23	(0)
2003–2009	Canterbury Marist Albian Beacons 2023	48	(65)
Super Rugby
Years	Team	Apps	(Points)
2004–2009	Crusaders	61	(100)
International career
Years	Team	Apps	(Points)
2004–2007	New Zealand	3	(5)
2013–2014	Barbarians	2	(5)
- Correct as of 1 June 2014

Casey Daniel Eti Laulala (born 3 May 1982) is a Samoan-born New Zealand former rugby union player.

== Career ==
Born and raised in Samoa, Laulala started boarding at Wesley College when he was 15.

Laulala made his test debut for New Zealand during the team's November–December 2004 end of year tour against Wales. He has played three games for the All Blacks, including two tests. Laulala played for the Crusaders Super 14 team and for Canterbury during the Air New Zealand Cup. Laulala attended Wesley College, Auckland for his schooling.

Laulala scored the match winning try for his side during the 2006 Super 14 Final, the match nicknamed "Fog Final" because of the dense fog. The next day he was recalled to the All Blacks, being named in the squad to play Ireland. He later went on to earn his second Test cap against Ireland in Auckland.

=== Cardiff Blues ===
Laulala signed for Welsh side Cardiff Blues for the 2009/10 season. He won the European Challenge Cup with the side in May 2010. Laulala scored 14 tries during his 58 appearances for the club.

=== Munster ===
On 9 February 2012, Munster Rugby confirmed Laulala as their second major signing for the 2012/13 season, alongside Northampton's Irish centre James Downey. He arrived to join up with Munster in May 2012.

Laulala made his full Munster debut on 1 September 2012, starting at outside centre in his side's opening 2012–13 Pro 12 fixture against Edinburgh. He scored his first try for Munster on 2 November 2012, against his old club Cardiff Blues. Laulala scored his second try for Munster on 30 March 2013, in a heavy loss to Glasgow Warriors.

He won the Man-of-the-Match award for Munster in their 10–31 away win against Cardiff Blues on 23 November 2013. It was confirmed on 15 December 2013 that Laulala would be leaving Munster at the end of the 2013–14 season. Laulala scored a try in Munster's 47-23 Heineken Cup quarter-final win against Toulouse on 5 April 2014. He was named in the 2013-14 Pro 12 Team of the Season on 5 May 2014.

=== Racing 92 ===
Laulala currently plays for French Top 14 side Racing 92.

== Barbarians ==
On 23 May 2013, Laulala was named in the Barbarians team to face England on 26 May. He also played against the British & Irish Lions in their opening tour fixture on 1 June 2013.
