= Roger Dustow =

- Full name: Roger Kevin Dustow
- Born: 11 November 1982 (age 44) Japan
- School: Rangitoto College

Rugby union career
- Position: Hooker
Provincial / State sides
Years	Team	Apps	(Points)
2004–07	North Harbour	32	(10)
Super Rugby
Years	Team	Apps	(Points)
2005	Blues	1	(0)

Roger Kevin Dustow (born 11 November 1982) is a New Zealand former professional rugby union player

Dustow was born in Japan and educated at Auckland's Rangitoto College.

A NZ Colts representative hooker, Dustow got called up by the Blues during the 2005 Super 12 season as an injury replacement for Derren Witcombe and made his debut off the bench in win over the Sharks at Eden Park. He was North Harbour's hooker when they defeated Canterbury to secure the Ranfurly Shield for the first time in 2006.

Dustow is now a police officer.
