= Craig West =

- Full name: Craig Murray West
- Born: 18 April 1980 (age 46)
- Height: 190 cm (6 ft 3 in)
- Weight: 114 kg (251 lb)

Rugby union career
- Position: Prop
Provincial / State sides
| Years | Team | Apps | (Points) |
| 2002–03 | Waikato | 2 | (0) |
| 2004 | Northland | 3 | (0) |
| 2006–08 | Waikato | 28 | (0) |
Super Rugby
| Years | Team | Apps | (Points) |
| 2007 | Chiefs | 3 | (0) |
International career
| Years | Team | Apps | (Points) |
| 2001 | NZ Colts | 2 | (0) |
| 2007 | NZ Māori | 3 | (0) |

Craig Murray West (born 18 April 1980) is a New Zealand former professional rugby union player.

== Rugby career ==
Raised in Taumarunui, West was a NZ Colts representative and played as a loosehead prop in the Waikato side that won the 2006 Air New Zealand Cup. His Waikato performances earned him a Chiefs call up during the 2007 Super 14 season and he made three appearances, two in the starting XV. He toured England with NZ Māori in 2007.

== Business ==
West ended his rugby career in 2009 due to injury and has since held several management roles at integrated services company Downer NZ. He was named Deloitte Top 200: Young Executive of the Year in 2015.
