= Tim Taylor (rugby union, born 1982) =

English rugby union player

- Born: 4 October 1982 (age 44) Derby, England
- Height: 1.80 m (5 ft 11 in)
- Weight: 91 kg (14 st 5 lb)

Rugby union career
- Position: Fly-half
Senior career
Years	Team	Apps	(Points)
- Tasman Makos
- Crusaders
- Leicester Tigers
- Saracens
- Nottingham
2010-2014	Gloucester	41	(171)

Tim Taylor (born 4 October 1982 in Derby, England) is a former rugby union player who played at fly-half.

== Career ==
Taylor made his first appearance for Gloucester when he came off the bench against Worcester in the Anglo-Welsh Cup. A week later he started his first game against Harlequins at the Twickenham Stoop in the same competition and scored a try and a match winning conversion to send Gloucester into the semi-finals. Taylor initially signed on loan but after just three appearances he signed a two-year contract. Taylor went on to score one more try in a Guinness Premiership defeat away to Newcastle Falcons. In 2012, Taylor signed a two-year contract extension with Gloucester until the end of the 2013–14 season.

On 6 March 2014, Taylor announced retirement from rugby with immediate effect because of his long-term knee injuries. He remained with Gloucester as their new Kicking and Skills Coach.
