= Chris Masoe =

NZ international rugby union player

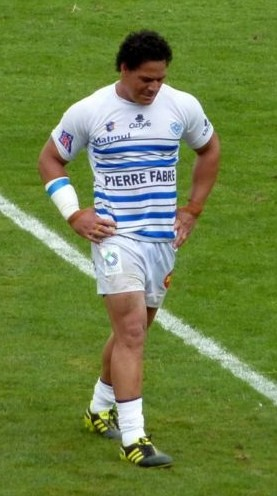
- Born: Matemini Christopher Masoe; 15 May 1979 (age 47) Savaii, Western Samoa
- Height: 183 cm (6 ft 0 in)
- Weight: 106 kg (16 st 10 lb; 234 lb)
- School: Wanganui City College
- Notable relative(s): Maselino Masoe (brother; former WBA middleweight champion)

Rugby union career
- Position(s): Flanker, Number 8
Senior career
Years	Team	Apps	(Points)
1999–2000	Wanganui	12	(20)
2001	Chiefs	1	(0)
2001–2005	Taranaki	41	(55)
2003–2008	Hurricanes	62	(40)
2006–2008	Wellington	19	(10)
2008–2012	Castres	108	(80)
2012–2015	Toulon	78	(35)
2015–2017	Racing 92	60	(40)
- Correct as of 21 December 2019
International career
Years	Team	Apps	(Points)
2005–2007	New Zealand	20	(15)
2005	Junior All Blacks	2	(0)
National sevens team
Years	Team		Comps
- New Zealand
Medal record
Men's rugby sevens
Representing New Zealand
Commonwealth Games
Gold medal – first place	2002 Manchester	Team competition

Chris Masoe (born 15 May 1979 in Savaii, Western Samoa) is a former New Zealand rugby union footballer, who last played for Racing Metro 92 in the Top 14, and a current professional boxer. He is the brother of boxer Maselino Masoe. He was born on the island of Savai'i.

== Career ==
=== Early life ===
Masoe was born in Savai'i, Western Samoa as the second youngest of 13 children. He emigrated to New Zealand aged 8 and was raised in Wanganui.

=== Super 14 ===
Masoe used to play for the Wellington Hurricanes in the Super 14. He appeared in all 11 Hurricanes matches in the 2005 season. He is capable of playing in all three loose-forward positions but has been concentrating on the openside flanker's role. Masoe has good pace and is a strong ball runner and a tough defender.

=== Sevens ===
He has been a regular member of the New Zealand Sevens squad in the past and was a member of the 2002 Commonwealth Games gold-winning team.

=== Handbag incident ===
On the night of the Super 14 final on 27 May 2006, former All Black captain Tana Umaga struck Hurricanes team mate Chris Masoe over the head with a woman's handbag, breaking her cell phone, after Masoe allegedly attempted to strike another patron. Masoe was fined $3000 by the NZRU as punishment.

=== Castres Olympique ===
In 2008, he signed a contract for French Top 14 team Castres Olympique. In 2010, he was selected in the French Barbarians squad to play Tonga on 26 November.

=== Toulon ===
In April 2012 it was confirmed Masoe was joining RC Toulonnais on a three-year deal. In May 2013 he started as Toulon won the 2013 Heineken Cup Final by 16–15 against Clermont Auvergne.

== Awards ==
His allround ability earned him the Taranaki Sportsman of the Year in 2002 and in the same year he was named New Zealand Sevens Player of the Year. Following his last season at Castres Olympique, he received the 2011–2012 Top 14 rugbyman of the year award on 15 October 2012.

== Honours ==
(France) Racing 92

- Top 14: 2015–16

== Professional boxing career ==
Chris Masoe
Personal information
- Nickname: Masi
- Nationality: Samoa; New Zealand
- Born: Matemini Christopher Masoe; May 15, 1979 (age 47) Savaiʻi, Western Samoa
- Height: 183 cm (6 ft 0 in)
- Weight: Heavyweight

Boxing career

Boxing record
- Total fights: 1
- Wins: 1
- Win by KO: 0
- Losses: 0
- Draws: 0

On December 2, 2022, Masoe followed in his brothers footsteps and made his professional boxing debut against Hawaiian born Lui Te'o. Masoe won the fight by Split Decision.

== Professional boxing record ==
1 fight	1 win	0 losses
By decision	1	0

No.	Result	Record	Opponent	Type	Round, time	Date	Location	Notes
1	Win	1–0	Lui Te'o	SD	4	Dec 2, 2022	TSB Stadium, New Plymouth, New Zealand	
