= Josh Taumalolo =

Tonga international rugby union player

- Born: Siua Taumalolo; 8 July 1976 (age 50) Nukuʻalofa, Tonga
- Height: 1.78 m (5 ft 10 in)
- Weight: 98 kg (15 st 6 lb)

Rugby union career
- Position(s): Centre, Fullback, Fly-half, Wing
- Current team: Bristol
Senior career
Years	Team	Apps	(Points)
1996–2000	Ebbw Vale		
2000–2003	Bridgend	31	(48)
2003–2004	Harlequins	14	(8)
2004–2005	Sale	4	(0)
2005–2006	Neath	6	(15)
2006–2008	Bristol	31	(12)
2008–2009	Grenoble	11	(0)
International career
Years	Team	Apps	(Points)
1996–2007	Tonga	26	(118)
Coaching career
- Years: Team
- 2012: Russia Assistant
- 2012–2013: Oxford Harlequins
- 2013–2018: Krasny Yar Assistant
- 2018: Russia Assistant
- 2019–2021: Krasny Yar

Siua Taumalolo (born 8 July 1976 in Nukuʻalofa, Tonga) is a former rugby union player. His former teams include Bristol in the Guinness Premiership.

Commonly referred to as Josh, he spent several years in Welsh rugby, playing for Ebbw Vale RFC before joining Bridgend RFC in 2000. He was a member of the Bridgend team which won the final Welsh Premier Division before the restructuring of Welsh rugby in 2003.

After this restructuring, Taumololo played for Harlequins for a year, and following their relegation, moved to Sale Sharks before returning to play in the now semi-professional Welsh Premier Division with Neath RFC.

He signed for Bristol from Neath in the Summer of 2006 on a one-year contract but was renewed after assured performances.

He is a Tongan international and has also toured with the Pacific Islanders rugby union team in 2006–2007.

He has signed a contract with FC Grenoble in the French Pro D2 for the 2008–2009 season.
