= John Schwalger =

- Born: 28 September 1983 (age 43) Apia, Samoa
- Height: 1.87 m (6 ft 2 in)
- Weight: 118 kg (18 st 8 lb)
- School: Bishop Viard College
- Notable relative(s): Mahonri Schwalger (uncle); Tim Lafai (cousin)
- Occupation: Rugby development officer

Rugby union career
- Position: Prop
Senior career
Years	Team	Apps	(Points)
2011–13	SU Agen	42	(0)
- Correct as of 15 July 2013
Provincial / State sides
Years	Team	Apps	(Points)
2005–11, 2013–15	Wellington	82	(15)
- Correct as of 23 October 2015
Super Rugby
Years	Team	Apps	(Points)
2006–11, 2013–14	Hurricanes	84	(15)
- Correct as of 2 June 2014
International career
Years	Team	Apps	(Points)
2007	New Zealand	2	(5)
- Correct as of 9 December 2011

John Schwalger (born 28 September 1983 in Apia, Samoa) is a former New Zealand rugby union player who played at the prop position.

== Early life ==
Schwalger moved to New Zealand after being born in Apia. He is the nephew of Samoa international Mahonri Schwalger.

== Career ==
His representative career started with the New Zealand Schoolboys team, before being included in New Zealand's Under 21 team in 2004. He won the Under 21 Rugby World Championship with that team in 2004.

=== Hurricanes and Wellington ===
In 2005 he was a member of the Hurricanes Super 12 (now Super Rugby) wider training group. He debuted for Wellington in the 2005 against the 2005 touring British & Irish Lions, and played for them in that year's National Provincial Championship. He was selected for the Hurricanes squad for the 2006 Super 14 and eventually forced his way into the starting line-up.

=== Junior All Blacks ===
Following his Super 14 form in 2006 he was selected for the Junior All Blacks, and played for the team as they won the 2006 IRB Pacific 5 Nations. After another successful 2006 Air New Zealand Cup — where he propped both sides of the scrum, he returned to the Hurricanes for the 2007 Super 14.

=== All Blacks ===
Following the 2007 Super 14 he was selected in the All Blacks training squad, and was one of only two non-capped players in the squad. His inclusion was the biggest surprise of the squad – as he was picked ahead of capped props Clarke Dermody and John Afoa. Ultimately, he was the final cut from the 2007 Rugby World Cup squad, as the previously injured Greg Somerville was declared fit to play and took up the final place in the squad.

=== Agen ===
After the 2011 Rugby World Cup, Schwalger agreed to sign a deal with French rugby club SU Agen.

=== Return to Hurricanes and Wellington ===
In May 2013, he signed a two-year deal to rejoin Wellington for the 2013 ITM Cup and also played for the Hurricanes since the 2013 Super Rugby season.
