= Josh Blackie =

- Born: 3 August 1979 (age 47) Auckland, New Zealand
- Height: 1.93 m (6 ft 4 in)
- Weight: 105 kg (231 lb)
- School: Liston College
- University: Massey University
- Occupation: General Manager Blues Super Rugby

Rugby union career
- Position: Flanker
Senior career
Years	Team	Apps	(Points)
2010–14	Kobelco Steelers	43	(90)
Provincial / State sides
Years	Team	Apps	(Points)
1999–06	Otago	73	(115)
- Correct as of 29 January 2007
Super Rugby
Years	Team	Apps	(Points)
2001–07	Highlanders	57	(45)
2008	Blues	6	(0)
- Correct as of 12 February 2017
International career
Years	Team	Apps	(Points)
1999–2000	NZ Under 21s		
2005	Junior All Blacks		
- Correct as of 29 January 2007
Medal record
Men's rugby sevens
Representing New Zealand
Commonwealth Games
Gold medal – first place	2006 Melbourne	Team competition

Josh Blackie (born 3 August 1979) is a former New Zealand rugby union player who notably played for Otago in the National Provincial Championship and the Highlanders in Super Rugby. He also had a long stint for the Kobelco Steelers in Japan and played a season with the Blues in 2008. His position of choice was flanker.

He has played over a dozen tournaments as part of the New Zealand Rugby Sevens team. He won a gold medal at the 2006 Melbourne Commonwealth Games.

On 23 April 2007, it was announced that Blackie would leave the Otago Rugby Football Union and the Highlanders to take up a contract to play rugby in Japan for the Kobelco Steelers.

On 10 October 2008, it was stated that Blackie signed a 2-year deal with the Auckland Rugby Union, making him eligible for the Blues and the All Blacks. Blackie cited the reason for moving to Auckland instead of Otago was he was born and raised in Auckland.

In 2013 Blackie established a scholarship of academic and sports fees for a year 10 student at his old school Liston College.
