= Ben Herring =

New Zealand rugby union footballer and coach

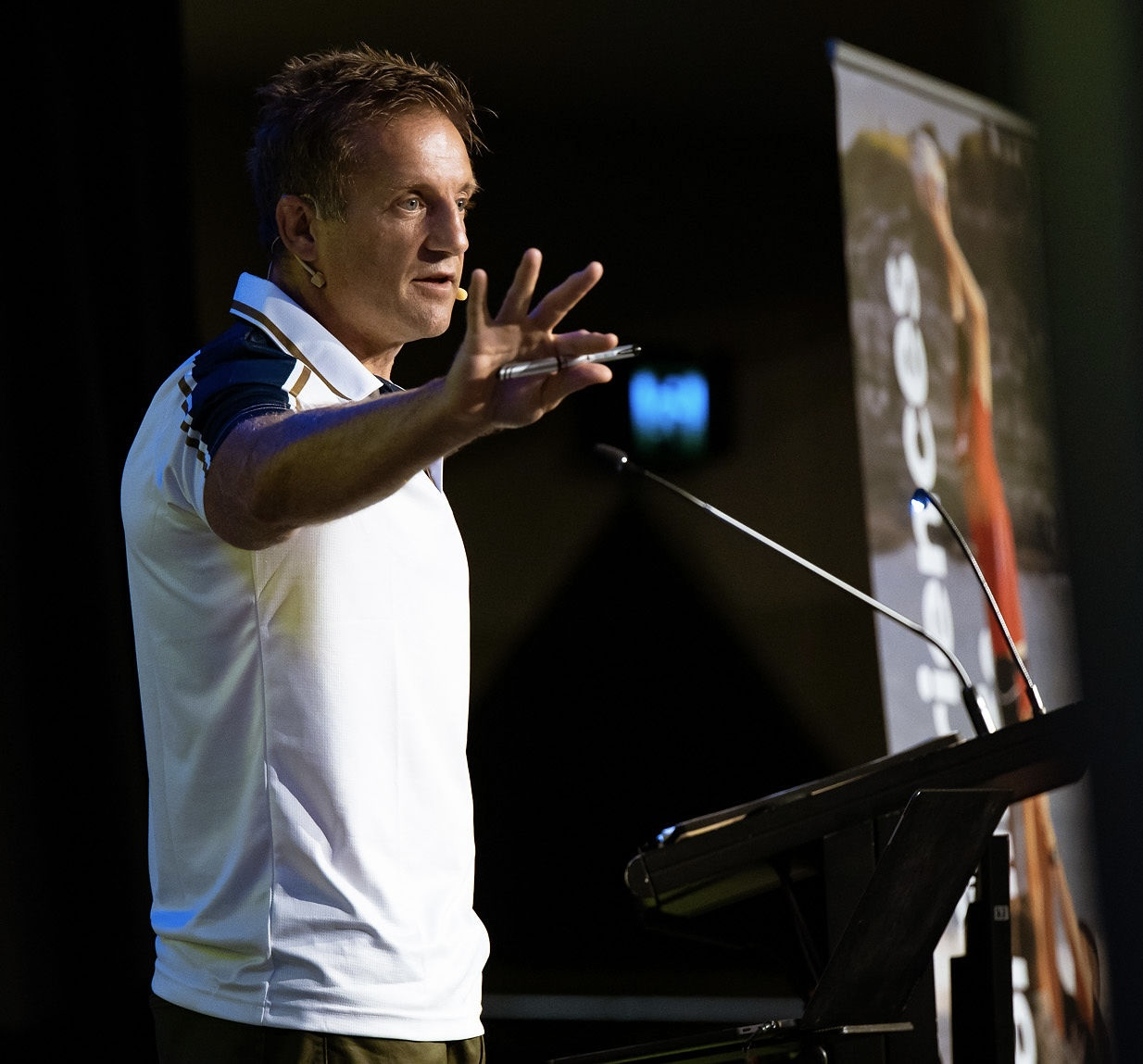
- Herring in 2025
- Born: 14 March 1980 (age 46) Auckland, New Zealand
- University: University of Otago, World Rugby Educator

Rugby union career
Senior career
Years	Team	Apps	(Points)
–	Southland		
–	Wellington		
–	Highlanders		
–	Hurricanes		
–	Leicester Tigers		
Coaching career
- Years: Team
- –: Leicester Tigers (Assistant)
- –: NEC Green Rockets

Official website
- https://www.coachingculture.com.au/

Ben Herring is a rugby union coach and former professional player.

== Playing career ==
Herring began his professional playing career in New Zealand, as an openside flanker. He played for Southland and later Wellington in New Zealand’s National Provincial Championship (NPC). He made his Super Rugby debut with the Highlanders, and later joined the Hurricanes. In 2007, Herring moved to England to join the Leicester Tigers. A series of concussions forced his early retirement in 2009.

== Coaching career ==
Following his retirement, Herring was appointed assistant coach at Leicester under Richard Cockerill. He then moved to Japan to join NEC Green Rockets.
