= Blair Stewart (rugby union) =

- Born: Blair Stewart; 2 October 1983 (age 43) Christchurch, New Zealand
- Height: 1.79 m (5 ft 10 in)
- Weight: 84 kg (13 st 3 lb)

Rugby union career
- Position: Fly-half
Senior career
Years	Team	Apps	(Points)
2008–2010	Albi	41	(292)
2010–2014	Grenoble	89	(320)
2014–16	Bayonne	13	(115)
- Correct as of 29 November 2014
Provincial / State sides
Years	Team	Apps	(Points)
2006–2008	Southland	28	(161)
Super Rugby
Years	Team	Apps	(Points)
2007	Hurricanes	4	(18)
2008	Highlanders	2	(2)

== Early life and beginnings ==
Blair Jason Stewart was born on 2 October 1983 in Christchurch, New Zealand. Growing up in a region with a strong rugby tradition, he came through the local club and school system.

Because the fly-half/first five-eighth position in the Canterbury region was very competitive—styles characterised by strong kicking games and tactical acumen—Stewart found opportunities elsewhere. Wikipedia

== Provincial and Super Rugby ==
To get more game-time, Stewart moved to Southland in 2006, playing in the National Provincial Championship (NPC). There, he made an immediate impact. Over his three seasons with Southland (2006-2008), he played 36 matches and scored 307 points.

Through his performances at provincial level, he gained opportunities in Super Rugby. In 2007 he played for the Hurricanes, making 4 appearances and scoring 18 points. Hurricanes In 2008, he joined the Highlanders, playing 2 matches there.

== Move to France and European club career ==
In late 2008 Stewart took his career overseas, joining SC Albi in the French Pro D2. Wikipedia+1 With Albi he established himself as a key figure, particularly recognised for his kicking game. Although Albi had fluctuating success (including promotion and relegation between Top 14 and Pro D2), Stewart remained an important player during his tenure. Wikipedia+1

In 2010 Stewart moved to FC Grenoble, where he continued playing in Pro D2, helping the club to success. During his time there, Grenoble won the Pro D2 championship and secured promotion to Top 14. Wikipedia+1

Later, in 2014, he signed for Aviron Bayonnais (Bayonne) to play in the Top 14. Wikipedia+1

== Playing style and strengths ==
Stewart’s position—fly-half—demands a variety of tactical and technical skills. From the details in his career:

- Kicking game: Stewart was known for his accuracy in penalty kicks, conversions, drop goals, and tactical kicking. His points tallies both provincially and in club rugby attest to this. Rugby History+1
- Game management: As fly-half he was responsible for directing play, and his contributions in guiding Southland and his French clubs reflect that.
- Adaptability: Transitioning from New Zealand provincial/Super Rugby to French rugby requires adaptation—differences in style, pace, conditions. Stewart managed this to the extent of becoming a regular starter abroad. Wikipedia

== Challenges and retirement ==
Stewart’s career did have setbacks:

- Injuries: For example, while at Bayonne he suffered a fracture of the fibula (peroneal injury) in November 2014 which kept him out for an extended period. Wikipedia
- The competitiveness of the fly-half position, particularly in New Zealand, meant limited opportunities at the very highest representative level (e.g. for the All Blacks) despite strong performances.

He eventually retired from playing in June 2016. Wikipedia

== Legacy ==
Blair Stewart may not be a household name globally, but within rugby circles he represents a model of professionalism: solid provincial foundations, skillful transition to international club competition, and resilience in face of adversity. Some of his legacies include:

1. Bridging NZ and France: He is an example of a New Zealand player who took skill-sets developed in the NPC and Super Rugby and successfully translated them into the European club game.
2. Scoring consistency: His point totals across multiple teams show that he was regularly relied on for scoring via kicking, which is a critical role for fly-halves.
3. Mentorship and example: For younger players, his path illustrates that even if one is not immediately in a top national side, there’s a viable and fulfilling professional career abroad.

== Conclusion ==
Blair Stewart’s career is about seizing opportunities, adapting to different rugby cultures, and making steady contributions both on and off the ball. While he may not have achieved the fame of some contemporaries, his work ethic, technical skills (especially in game management and kicking), and capacity to perform mark him as a noteworthy figure in modern rugby.
