= David Holwell =

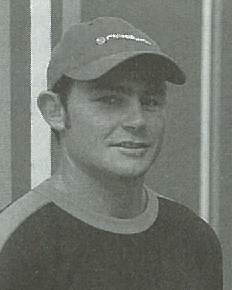
- Holwell in 2001
- Born: 7 January 1975 (age 51) Whangārei, New Zealand
- Height: 1.78 m (5 ft 10 in)
- Weight: 83 kg (183 lb)

Rugby union career
- Position: First five-eighth
Senior career
| Years | Team | Apps | (Points) |
| 2005, 2008 | Leinster | | |
Provincial / State sides
| Years | Team | Apps | (Points) |
| 1995–98, 2007–10 | Northland | | |
| 1999–2004 | Wellington | | |
Super Rugby
| Years | Team | Apps | (Points) |
| 1998–2004, 2006 | Hurricanes | 76 | (676) |
| 2007 | Blues | 6 | (24) |

David Holwell (born 7 January 1975) is a former rugby union player. A first five-eighth, Holwell played for Wellington and Northland in the Air New Zealand Cup, ITM Cup and NPC, and for the Hurricanes and Blues in Super Rugby. He also had stints with Leinster in 2005 and 2008.

== Provincial Rugby ==
He played for Northland between 1995 and 1998 and from 2006 to 2010, for whom he made more than 100 appearances. He also played for Wellington between 1999 and 2004, during his time with the Hurricanes.

== Super Rugby ==
Holwell spent much of his career with the Hurricanes. He was initially drafted from Northland in 1998, and stayed with the team for seven consecutive seasons, scoring 676 points in 76 appearances. After a stint with Leinster in 2005, he played a final season with the Hurricanes in 2006, where his side were defeated in the final by Crusaders.

He spent the 2007 season with the Blues, however he made only six appearances for the club in what was his final season of Super Rugby.
