= Cameron McIntyre =

NZ rugby union player

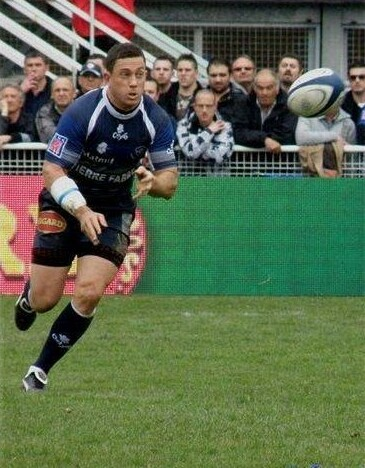
- Born: 3 June 1981 (age 45) Christchurch, New Zealand
- Height: 1.81 m (5 ft 11 in)
- University: Saint Bedes College
- Notable relative(s): Bob Stuart, Kevin Stuart (great uncles)
- Occupation: Player Agent

Rugby union career
- Position: Fly-half / Inside Centre
Senior career
Years	Team	Apps	(Points)
2006-10	Castres	125	(295)
2011-12	NEC Green Rockets	12	(63)
2013−??	Toyota Verblitz	15	(94)
- Correct as of 19 January 2015
Provincial / State sides
Years	Team	Apps	(Points)
2001–06, 2015–2016	Canterbury	37	
- Correct as of 26 October 2015
Super Rugby
Years	Team	Apps	(Points)
2004	Crusaders	15	(12)
2005	Highlanders	9	(0)
2006	Crusaders	10	(5)

Cameron McIntyre (born 3 June 1981) is a former rugby union player who played for Canterbury in the Air New Zealand Cup and for the Crusaders in Super Rugby. His time spent at Canterbury and the Crusaders saw him keep Andrew Mehrtens on the bench with Dan Carter playing inside centre. His club rugby team is Marist/Albion in the Christchurch premier competition to which he captained them to a club championship. In 2006, he was part of the Junior All Black team that won the Pacific Cup and was named player of the tournament.

After the New Zealand 2006 season finished, McIntyre moved to France where he played in 125 games for Castres in the French Top 14. In 2013, he moved to Japan and played for the Toyota Verblitz in the Japanese Top League. In 2015 McIntyre returned to Canterbury, playing for one season. McIntyre played positions fly-half and inside centre.

McIntyre is the great nephew of former All Blacks Bob Stuart & Kevin Stuart.

As of 2026, McIntyre is listed as a Player Agent for Auckland-based sports management company LittleGIANT.
