= Bryce Lawrence =

NZ rugby union referee (born 1970)

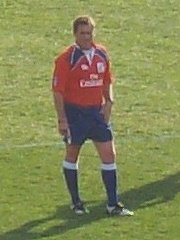
- Lawrence during the 2011 Six Nations match Italy vs France
- Born: 23 December 1970 (age 55)

Rugby union career
Refereeing career
Years	Competition	Apps
2011	Rugby World Cup	
2008	Tri Nations	
2005–2012	Super Rugby	

Bryce Lawrence (born 23 December 1970) is a former professional international rugby union referee from the Bay of Plenty, New Zealand and past High Performance Referee and Education Manager for the New Zealand Rugby Union. He is now a real estate agent.

== Overview ==
Originally a primary school headmaster, Lawrence took up refereeing in 1994, following in footsteps of his father, Keith Lawrence, who had been an international rugby union referee from 1985 to 1991. Making his first class debut in 1997, Bryce took charge of his first Super Rugby match in 2005, controlling a game between the Crusaders and Chiefs. His more notable matches in charge include the 2008 Super 14 semi-final between the Waratahs and the Sharks, the final of the 2008 Air New Zealand Cup and two test matches involving Australia and South Africa in the 2008 Tri Nations. Lawrence refereed his first Tri Nations matches during the 2008 series.

Lawrence refereed the first British & Irish Lions test during their 2009 tour of South Africa and was an assistant referee in the second test. He refereed the Six Nations France versus England match in 2010.

Bryce Lawrence refereed the quarterfinal in the 2011 rugby world cup between South Africa and Australia. He performed poorly, making mistakes which affected the outcome of the match. He allegedly received threats from South African supporters and refused to referee there during the 2012 Super Rugby season. Lawrence was dropped from the nine-man elite panel in 2012.

During the 2012 ITM Cup Lawrence refereed his 200th first class match. The milestone was played between Wellington and Taranaki Rugby Football Union. At the time, he was the fourth New Zealand referee to reach the double century milestone with former New Zealand referees Paddy O'Brien (221 matches), Paul Honiss (220) and Kiwi turned Australian referee Steve Walsh (210) doing so before him. The 200th match was supposedly Lawrence's last match but due to other referees retaining injuries Lawrence refereed the semi-final of the 2012 ITM Cup.

He announced his retirement in 2012, motivated partly by reactions to his self-acknowledged poor performance in the 2011 Rugby World Cup quarter-final match between South Africa and Australia.
