= Byron Kelleher =

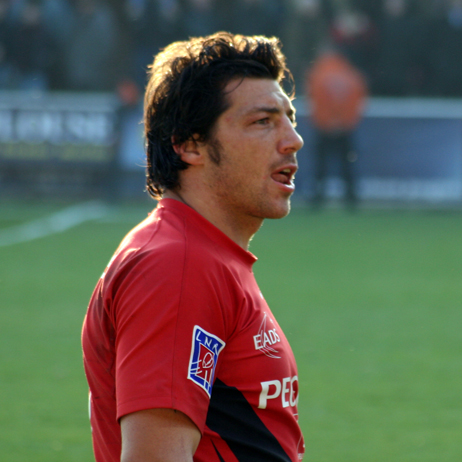
- Born: Byron Terence Kelleher; 3 December 1976 (age 49) Dunedin, New Zealand
- Height: 1.77 m (5 ft 10 in)
- Weight: 95 kg (14 st 13 lb)
- School: Otago Boys' High School
- Occupation: Professional Rugby Union Footballer

Rugby union career
- Position: Half Back
Senior career
Years	Team	Apps	(Points)
2007–2011	Toulouse	97	(60)
2011–2012	Stade Français		
- Correct as of 16 August 2011
Provincial / State sides
Years	Team	Apps	(Points)
1997–2003	Otago	60	(85)
2004–2006	Waikato	14	(10)
Super Rugby
Years	Team	Apps	(Points)
1998–2003	Highlanders	54	(80)
2004–2007	Chiefs	38	(20)
International career
Years	Team	Apps	(Points)
1999–2007	New Zealand	57	(40)

Byron Terence Kelleher (born 3 December 1976) is a former rugby union scrum-half who played for Stade Toulouse in the French Top 14 and has played 57 tests for the All Blacks. He was a very aggressive player, who specialized in pick-and-go techniques.

== Rugby career ==
He was educated at Otago Boys' High School, and originally played for Otago in the NPC and the Highlanders in the Super 14. He moved north in 2004 to play for Waikato and the Chiefs. He is 1.75m tall and weighs 95 kg. He was New Zealand's Super 12 Player of the Year in 1999.

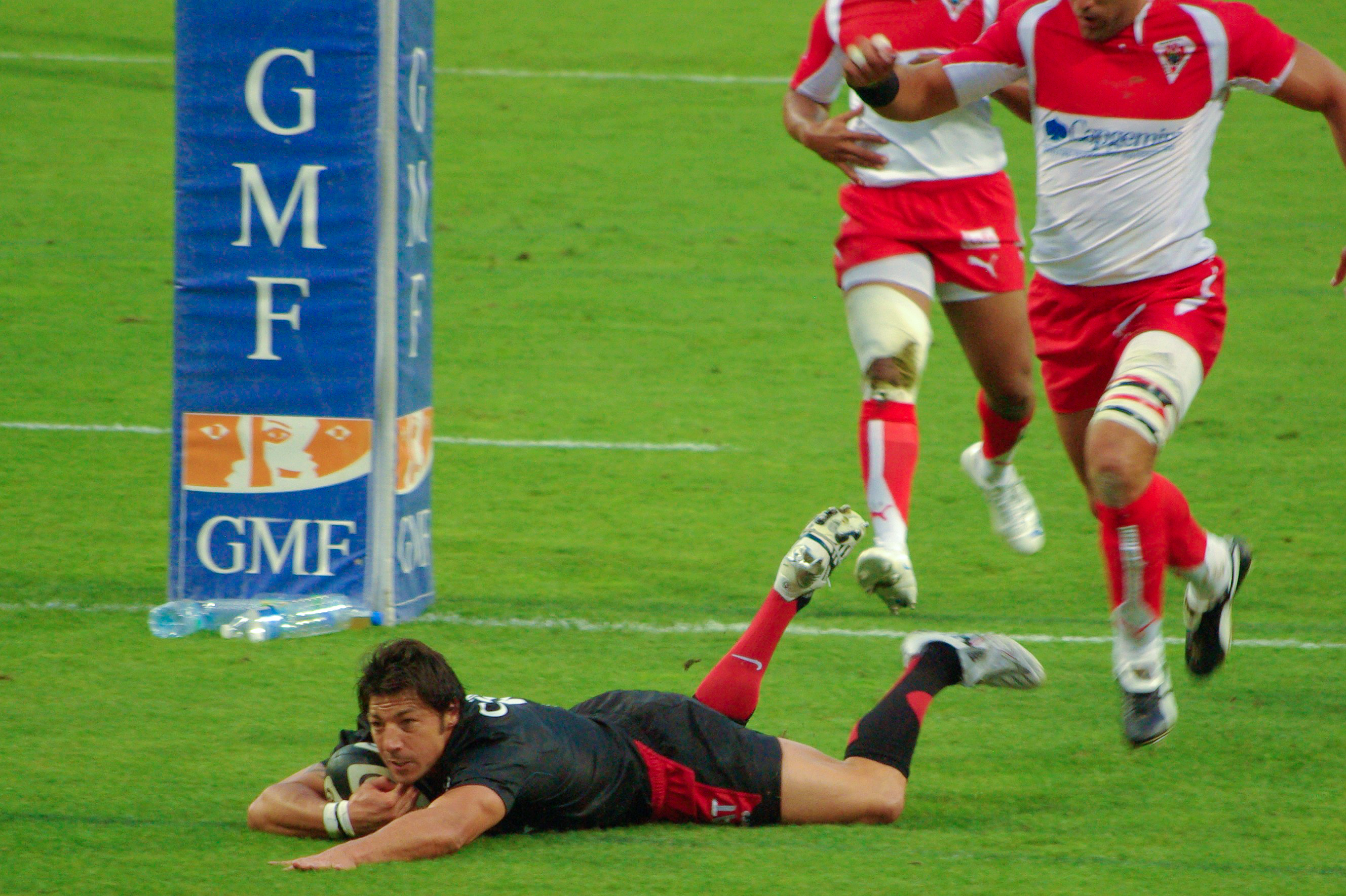
Kelleher scoring a try for Toulouse against Biarritz

Kelleher had signed a contract to play for Agen in the Top 14 after the 2007 Rugby World Cup; however, the club's relegation to the second-level Rugby Pro D2 after the 2006–07 Top 14 season caused the contract to be cancelled. Kelleher went on to sign with traditional Top 14 powers Toulouse, effective with the end of the Rugby World Cup.

He won the "Bouclier de Brennus" (the French Rugby Union Title) in the 2007–08 Top 14 season with Stade Toulousain, and was elected by the Top 14 players as the season's best player. In 2010 he played in the final as Toulouse won the Heineken Cup.

In 2010, he was selected in the French Barbarians squad to play Tonga on 26 November.

He was known as an unpredictable and unorthodox halfback, with his speed and strength, sometimes preferring to run with the ball and make line-breaks rather than passing the ball after rucks and mauls.

After his sports retirement, he became an international ambassador for Airbus, a rugby consultant for Sky Sports, acquired half of the shares of Evangelina, a bar-restaurant in Toulouse, opened a consulting company specialised in French lifestyle and rugby and volunteered for a regional French NGO called "L'Ombre du Baobab" to help children in Sumba island.

== Personal life ==
=== Relationships ===
In December 2004, Kelleher met American porn-star Ashley Spalding, better known as Kaylani Lei. They dated and lived together until they split in June 2006. British newspaper The Independent called them "a raunchy Antipodean answer to Posh and Becks", referring to the high-profile relationship of football player David Beckham and his wife ex-Spice Girl Victoria.

In 2009, Kelleher was dating Julie Novès, 22 years old at the time and daughter of Toulouse manager Guy Novès while he was involved in a car crash and assaulted another driver. The media thought involving his coach's daughter in a car accident would get him in further troubles.

A close friend of the Prince and Princess of Monaco, he was one of the guests at the couple's wedding in July 2011. The press suspected he was romantically involved with the Princess and New Zealand beer brand Tui jokingly created billboards referencing to the rumour.

== Issues and controversies ==
In May 2024, Kelleher received a fine and a suspended sentence from a French court in connection with a domestic violence case.

He had previously faced legal issues during his time in France, including a 2009 drink-driving case and a fine imposed in 2017 following a minor domestic-related incident.

Kelleher has denied other allegations reported in the media and has continued his involvement in rugby and business activities in France.
