= Brendan Haami =

- Full name: Brendan Derek Te Oranga Haami
- Born: 4 December 1974 (age 51) Stratford, New Zealand
- Height: 5 ft 8 in (173 cm)
- Weight: 167 lb (76 kg)

Rugby union career
- Position: Half-back
Senior career
Years	Team	Apps	(Points)
1997–04	Taranaki	69	(30)
2004–05	Rotherham	18	(0)
2005	Wellington	5	(0)
2006–08	Taranaki	23	(5)
Super Rugby
Years	Team	Apps	(Points)
2001–06	Hurricanes	29	(5)
National sevens team
Years	Team		Comps
2000	New Zealand		

Brendan Derek Te Oranga Haami (born 4 December 1974) is a New Zealand former professional rugby union player.

Born in Stratford, Taranaki, Haami was a diminutive half-back and is known by the nickname "Knackers".

Haami, NZ Maori representative, played 93 matches for Taranaki, debuting in 1997. He appeared for New Zealand in the 1999–2000 World Sevens Series. A Hurricanes player, Haami made most of his Super 12 appearances from 2001 to 2003, while an understudy to Jason Spice. He had a stint in England at Rotherham in 2004–05 and played briefly with Wellington on his return to New Zealand, as cover for Piri Weepu, before finishing his career back at Taranaki.
