= Luke Mahoney =

- Full name: Luke Brian Mahoney
- Born: 5 January 1980 (age 46) Lower Hutt, New Zealand
- Height: 5 ft 11 in (180 cm)
- Weight: 233 lb (106 kg)

Rugby union career
- Position: Hooker
Senior career
Years	Team	Apps	(Points)
2001–07	Wellington	69	(5)
2007–15	Rugby Rovigo		
Super Rugby
Years	Team	Apps	(Points)
2006	Hurricanes	9	(0)

Luke Brian Mahoney (born 5 January 1980) is a New Zealand former professional rugby union player.

Mahoney was born in Lower Hutt and played his rugby for Wellington as hooker from 2001 to 2007. He spent the 2006 Super 14 season with the Hurricanes as an understudy to Andrew Hore, playing nine games off the bench.

A New Zealand Māori representative player, Mahoney scored the winning try in a match against the New South Wales Waratahs and was a member of the side that won the 2006 Churchill Cup in North America.

Mahoney moved to Italy in 2007 and spent eight seasons with Rugby Rovigo.
