= Viliame Waqaseduadua =

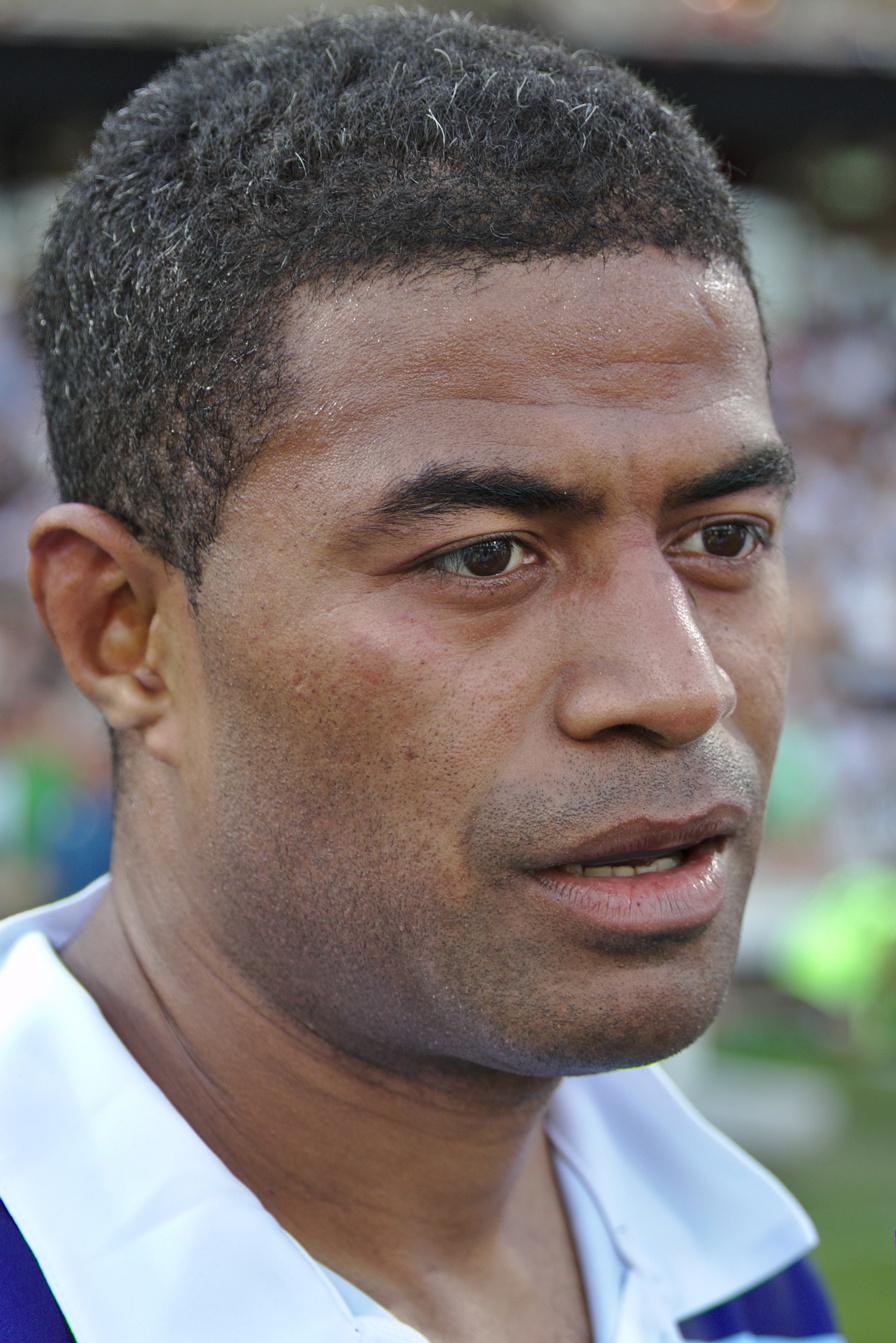
- Born: 23 April 1983 (age 43) Suva
- Height: 1.82 m (5 ft 11 1/2 in)
- Weight: 82 kg (181 lb)

Rugby union career
- Position: Wing
Senior career
Years	Team	Apps	(Points)
2009–2010	CA Brive	27	(23)
2011–13	Grenoble	34	(5)
2013–2015	Agen	19	(15)
Provincial / State sides
Years	Team	Apps	(Points)
- Poverty Bay
2005-2008	North Harbour	33	(80)
2011	Auckland	1	(0)
Super Rugby
Years	Team	Apps	(Points)
2006	Blues	7	(5)
2007	Highlanders	9	(15)
2008	Chiefs	7	(10)
International career
Years	Team	Apps	(Points)
2007	Junior All Blacks	3	(10)
National sevens team
Years	Team		Comps
- New Zealand 7s

Viliame Waqaseduadua (born 23 April 1983 in Suva, Fiji) is a former New Zealand rugby union player, who usually played as a wing. He finished his career in France, playing for SU Agen Lot-et-Garonne. Due to his surname, he was simply and affectionately known as Vili or Waga. He started playing his schoolboy rugby for Ratu Sukuna Memorial School in the annual Deans Trophy competition, the holy grail for secondary schools rugby in Fiji. He helped his team reach the semi-finals in 2001 where they lost to eventual winners Suva Grammar School. It was here that he was scouted by rugby scouts and offered a scholarship to attend Rotorua Boys' High School in New Zealand. He also found success here as their 1st XV also reached final of the National First XV Championship (New Zealand) in 2002 and shared a draw with Gisborne Boys' High School for the title and the coveted Moascar Cup

Waga is 1.82 m (6 ft 0 in) tall and weighs 82 kg (181 lb). He starred for the North Harbour team in the Air New Zealand Cup competition. He first played rugby for the Poverty Bay team in the third division, where he single-handedly took the team to win the third division title. He made his provincial debut for Poverty Bay in 2004 against Auckland, where, despite his team going down, his skills were already evident. He has played 28 provincial matches to date, 7 of which for Poverty Bay and the rest for North Harbour. He has scored 20 tries for both teams. He made his Super 14 debut for the Blues against the Highlanders in 2006 and throughout the 2006 Super 14, he played 8 times for the Blues, scoring 1 try. He has also played in the Pacific Nations Cup for the Junior All Blacks team. In 2007, he was recruited by the franchise he made his debut against, the Highlanders. In 2008, he was overlooked by his home province and picked up by the Waikato Chiefs, out of the draft.

The highlight of his career to date was in 2006, when single-handedly won the Ranfurly Shield from Canterbury in 2006, scoring 2 tries.

The All Black coaches did not appreciate his skills and he signed a contract with French Top 14 side Brive in 2009.

In 2009, he represented New Zealand at the 2009 Wellington Sevens, coming back o the team as a senior player, hoping to pass on some of his knowledge of the game to the younger players, four years after last playing in the Sevens tournament.

In 2011, he returned to New Zealand, hoping to remind the national selectors of what they had been missing in the last couple of years while he was away dazzling French crowds with his array of sublime attacking skills. He played for Auckland against Otago in the Air New Zealand Cup.
