= List of Highlanders (rugby union) players =

This is a list of rugby union footballers who have played for the Highlanders in Super Rugby. The list includes any player that has played in a regular season match, semi-final or final for the Highlanders, ordered by debut date and name. The Highlanders were a foundation team in the 1996 Super 12 season.

== Players ==
No.	Name	Caps	Tries	C	P	DG	Points	Debut	Last
1	Stephen Bachop	10	2				10	03/03/1996	12/05/1996
2	Matthew Cooper	8	4	12	14		86	03/03/1996	05/05/1996
3	Lio Falaniko	24	5				25	03/03/1996	24/04/1998
4	Stu Forster	16	1				5	03/03/1996	16/05/1997
5	Paul Henderson	8						03/03/1996	12/05/1996
6	David Latta	5						03/03/1996	05/05/1996
7	Rob Lawton	6						03/03/1996	10/04/1996
8	John Leslie	32	5				25	03/03/1996	22/05/1998
9	Brian Lima	24	13				65	03/03/1996	30/05/1999
10	Nick Moore	12						03/03/1996	26/04/1997
11	Taine Randell	77	9				45	03/03/1996	10/05/2003
12	Brendon Timmins	42	2				10	03/03/1996	26/04/2002
13	Toʻo Vaega	13	4				20	03/03/1996	03/05/1997
14	Kupu Vanisi	23	4				20	03/03/1996	16/05/1998
15	Jeff Wilson	72	35	10	9		222	03/03/1996	18/05/2002
16	Tony Brown	91	5	137	180	6	857	09/03/1996	17/06/2011
17	Paul Cooke	9	2				10	09/03/1996	12/05/1996
18	Andy Rich	4						09/03/1996	16/04/1996
19	Justin Cullen	9						16/03/1996	12/05/1996
20	Chris England	5	1				5	16/03/1996	12/05/1996
21	Michael Mika	14						16/03/1996	16/05/1998
22	Anton Oliver	127	10				50	16/03/1996	05/05/2007
23	Simon Culhane	16	1	18	54	3	212	30/03/1996	15/05/1999
24	George Leaupepe	7	1				5	02/04/1996	30/03/2001
25	Brett McCormack	16	2				10	02/04/1996	21/04/2000
26	Murray Driver	3						10/04/1996	21/04/1996
27	Josh Kronfeld	42	8				40	21/04/1996	20/05/2000
28	Isitolo Maka	37	14				70	05/05/1996	12/05/2001
29	Jason Wright	4						12/05/1996	16/05/1997
30	Manasa Bari	6	4				20	08/03/1997	26/04/1997
31	Matt Carrington	19	4				20	08/03/1997	15/05/1999
32	Steve Gordon	10						08/03/1997	09/05/1997
33	Tiwini Hemi	2						08/03/1997	14/03/1997
34	Carl Hoeft	98	1				5	08/03/1997	14/05/2005
35	Finau Maka	6						08/03/1997	03/05/1997
36	Kees Meeuws	47	1				5	08/03/1997	12/05/2001
37	Romi Ropati	50	19				95	08/03/1997	18/05/2002
38	Ace Tiatia	6	1				5	08/03/1997	26/04/1997
39	Pailate Fili	14	2				10	22/03/1997	22/05/1998
40	Simon Maling	65	3				15	22/03/1997	08/05/2004
41	John Blaikie	53						12/04/1997	23/02/2002
42	Brendan Laney	44	5	5	6	3	62	03/05/1997	12/05/2001
43	Doug Howlett	2	3				15	09/05/1997	16/05/1997
44	Pita Alatini	48	12				60	27/02/1998	12/05/2001
45	Rhys Duggan	12						27/02/1998	22/05/1998
46	Kelvin Middleton	58	5				25	27/02/1998	25/04/2003
47	Jeremy Stanley	16	6				30	27/02/1998	23/04/1999
48	Reuben Parkinson	2						06/03/1998	28/03/1998
49	Davin Heaps	3						28/03/1998	22/05/1998
50	Byron Kelleher	54	16				80	28/03/1998	10/05/2003
51	Carl Hayman	81	3				15	12/03/1999	05/05/2007
52	Joe McDonnell	31	1				5	12/03/1999	25/04/2003
53	Eugene Morgan	2						20/03/1999	26/03/1999
54	Duncan Blaikie	3						01/05/1999	07/04/2000
55	Marc Ellis	11	3				15	26/02/2000	20/05/2000
56	Rico Gear	4	1				5	26/02/2000	01/04/2000
57	Rua Tipoki	11	2	1			12	26/02/2000	20/05/2000
58	Samiu Vahafolau	20	3				15	26/02/2000	03/05/2003
59	Dan Parkinson	2						11/03/2000	17/03/2000
60	Tom Willis	23						11/03/2000	10/05/2003
61	Paul Miller	20	1				5	01/04/2000	14/05/2005
62	Karl Te Nana	5	1				5	01/04/2000	29/04/2000
63	Billy Fulton	12						23/02/2001	05/04/2002
64	Iliesa Tanivula	23	4				20	23/02/2001	02/04/2004
65	Aisea Tuilevu	33	16				80	23/02/2001	01/05/2004
66	Josh Blackie	56	9				45	03/03/2001	05/05/2007
67	David Gibson	7						03/03/2001	18/05/2002
68	Vula Maimuri	10	1				5	03/03/2001	12/05/2001
69	Mark Urwin	3						10/03/2001	05/05/2001
70	Eroni Clarke	2						20/04/2001	05/05/2001
71	Hayden Reid	1						20/04/2001	20/04/2001
72	Sam Harding	31	4				20	23/02/2002	08/05/2004
73	Filipo Levi	63	3				15	23/02/2002	05/05/2007
74	Marius Mostert	1						23/02/2002	23/02/2002
75	Craig Newby	67	8				40	23/02/2002	17/05/2008
76	Ryan Nicholas	31	7				35	23/02/2002	08/05/2004
77	Paul Steinmetz	22	8				40	23/02/2002	10/05/2003
78	Willie Walker	22	7	21	42		203	23/02/2002	10/05/2003
79	Peter Bowden	11	1				5	02/03/2002	25/04/2003
80	Seilala Mapusua	50	5				25	02/03/2002	12/05/2006
81	Grant Webb	19	2				10	02/03/2002	14/05/2005
82	Brad Fleming	8	3				15	21/02/2003	10/05/2003
83	Danny Lee	17	2				10	21/02/2003	14/05/2005
84	Daniel Quate	12						21/02/2003	08/05/2004
85	Seru Rabeni	11	3				15	21/02/2003	27/03/2004
86	Paul Williams	19	4	1	2		28	21/02/2003	17/05/2008
87	James Arlidge	7	1	1			7	01/03/2003	10/05/2003
88	Ben Herring	2						07/03/2003	15/03/2003
89	Jimmy Cowan	108	10				50	15/03/2003	06/07/2012
90	Clarke Dermody	44	1				5	20/02/2004	05/05/2007
91	Nick Evans	32	9	16	28	3	170	20/02/2004	05/05/2007
92	Glen Horton	21	3				15	20/02/2004	10/05/2008
93	Hayden Pedersen	13	3				15	20/02/2004	14/05/2005
94	Ben Hurst	8	1				5	28/02/2004	08/05/2004
95	Neil Brew	31	2				10	05/03/2004	12/05/2006
96	Hale T-Pole	19	1				5	20/03/2004	21/04/2007
97	Jason Rutledge	59	8				40	27/03/2004	22/03/2013
98	Tom Donnelly	65	3				15	02/04/2004	17/06/2011
99	Toby Morland	23	3				15	02/04/2004	17/05/2008
100	Matt Saunders	34	10				50	24/04/2004	17/06/2011
101	Hoani MacDonald	34	2				10	08/05/2004	26/05/2012
102	Ben Blair	23	3	29	47		214	25/02/2005	12/05/2006
103	Colin Bourke	2						25/02/2005	11/03/2005
104	Ryan Glover	1						25/02/2005	25/02/2005
105	Cameron McIntyre	9						25/02/2005	14/05/2005
106	James Ryan	27	1				5	25/02/2005	07/04/2007
107	Jason Shoemark	30	3				15	25/02/2005	15/05/2010
108	Anthony Tuitavake	10						25/02/2005	07/05/2005
109	David Hall	32						05/03/2005	16/05/2009
110	Mahonri Schwalger	17						05/03/2005	17/06/2011
111	Chris King	107	6				30	11/03/2005	19/07/2014
112	Vilimoni Delasau	8	2				10	11/02/2006	16/04/2006
113	Roy Kinikinilau	13	5				25	11/02/2006	12/05/2006
114	Chris Smylie	10						11/02/2006	12/05/2006
115	Nick White	7						11/02/2006	08/04/2006
116	Tim Boys	45	1				5	25/02/2006	29/03/2013
117	Richard Kahui	8	3				15	25/02/2006	12/05/2006
118	Callum Bruce	22	2		2		16	04/03/2006	05/05/2007
119	Jason Macdonald	40	2				10	04/03/2006	10/04/2010
120	Ben Smith	7	1				5	11/03/2006	01/03/2008
121	Adam Thomson	67	21				105	18/03/2006	06/07/2012
122	Ryan Bambry	1						25/03/2006	25/03/2006
123	Jason Kawau	8	3				15	25/03/2006	05/05/2007
124	Willie Ripia	1						08/04/2006	08/04/2006
125	Kane Thompson	14	1				5	08/04/2006	21/04/2007
126	Craig Clare	4						02/02/2007	02/03/2007
127	Jamie Mackintosh	66	2				10	02/02/2007	01/06/2013
128	Lucky Mulipola	15	3				15	02/02/2007	21/03/2009
129	Alando Soakai	58	3				15	02/02/2007	17/06/2011
130	Viliame Waqaseduadua	9	3				15	02/02/2007	27/04/2007
131	Keith Cameron	8						10/02/2007	17/05/2008
132	Charlie Hore	7		6	8		36	10/02/2007	05/05/2007
133	Willie Rickards	2						10/02/2007	17/02/2007
134	Ezra Taylor	8						10/02/2007	05/05/2007
135	Greg Zampach	2						10/02/2007	17/02/2007
136	James Wilson	17		10	7		41	17/02/2007	19/04/2008
137	Aaron Bancroft	14	6			1	33	24/02/2007	10/05/2008
138	Daniel Bowden	21	3	15	11		78	15/02/2008	16/05/2009
139	Mike Delany	19	1	8	27	1	105	15/02/2008	06/07/2012
140	Johnny Leota	23	2				10	15/02/2008	16/05/2009
141	Brett Mather	8						15/02/2008	02/05/2008
142	Clint Newland	34	1				5	15/02/2008	30/04/2010
143	Isaac Ross	9						15/02/2008	17/05/2008
144	Steven Setephano	30	4				20	15/02/2008	15/05/2010
145	Niva Ta'auso	10						15/02/2008	17/05/2008
146	Hayden Triggs	36	2				10	15/02/2008	15/05/2010
147	Fetuʻu Vainikolo	37	13				65	15/02/2008	15/05/2010
148	Blair Stewart	2		1			2	26/04/2008	02/05/2008
149	George Naoupu	12	1				5	02/05/2008	16/05/2009
150	Josh Bekhuis	84	2				10	13/02/2009	25/03/2023
151	Israel Dagg	25	8	17	18		128	13/02/2009	15/05/2010
152	Jayden Hayward	9						13/02/2009	08/05/2010
153	Sean Romans	11						13/02/2009	26/03/2010
154	Ben Smith	153	39	1		1	200	13/02/2009	21/06/2019
155	Kendrick Lynn	36	4				20	20/02/2009	06/07/2012
156	Anthony Perenise	6						20/02/2009	08/05/2009
157	Matt Berquist	18	1	14	15		78	27/02/2009	15/05/2010
158	Scott Cowan	1						27/02/2009	27/02/2009
159	John Hardie	52	4				20	13/02/2010	12/06/2015
160	Michael Hobbs	7	4	4	2		34	13/02/2010	24/04/2010
161	Nasi Manu	65	1				5	13/02/2010	04/07/2015
162	James Paterson	21	2				10	13/02/2010	07/05/2011
163	Robbie Robinson	20	2	7	9	1	54	19/02/2010	17/06/2011
164	Bronson Murray	33	1				5	06/03/2010	12/07/2013
165	Joe Tuineau	6						20/03/2010	08/05/2010
166	Jarrad Hoeata	53	1				5	18/02/2011	19/07/2014
167	Brayden Mitchell	12						18/02/2011	06/07/2014
168	Kade Poki	27	10				50	18/02/2011	12/07/2013
169	Lima Sopoaga	92	15	166	147	5	863	18/02/2011	21/07/2018
170	David Te Moana	6						18/02/2011	23/04/2011
171	Shaun Treeby	50	8				40	18/02/2011	12/06/2015
172	Siale Piutau	19	3				15	25/02/2011	06/07/2012
173	Aaron Smith	185	35				175	05/03/2011	02/06/2023
174	Telusa Veainu	5						05/03/2011	17/06/2011
175	Nick Crosswell	23						19/03/2011	06/07/2012
176	Halani Aulika	1						01/04/2011	01/04/2011
177	Colin Slade	20	3	28	36	1	182	01/04/2011	12/07/2013
178	Ben Atiga	1						13/05/2011	13/05/2011
179	Phil Burleigh	34	6				30	25/02/2012	19/07/2014
180	Tamati Ellison	23	6				30	25/02/2012	12/07/2013
181	Hosea Gear	32	13				65	25/02/2012	12/07/2013
182	James Haskell	12						25/02/2012	06/07/2012
183	Andrew Hore	29	2				10	25/02/2012	12/07/2013
184	Chris Noakes	13	2	14	18		92	25/02/2012	06/07/2012
185	Buxton Popoali'i	15						25/02/2012	06/07/2013
186	Culum Retallick	10						25/02/2012	12/05/2012
187	Slade McDowall	1						03/03/2012	03/03/2012
188	Kurt Baker	10	2				10	10/03/2012	12/06/2015
189	Maʻafu Fia	39						17/03/2012	06/03/2015
190	Elliot Dixon	105	12	1			62	24/03/2012	21/06/2019
191	Doug Tietjens	6						24/03/2012	05/05/2012
192	Jacob Ellison	1						07/04/2012	07/04/2012
193	Scott Fuglistaller	2						19/05/2012	26/05/2012
194	Liam Coltman	138	8				40	22/02/2013	22/05/2022
195	Ma'a Nonu	9	1				5	22/02/2013	29/06/2013
196	Hayden Parker	30	1	14	21	2	102	22/02/2013	22/04/2016
197	Fumiaki Tanaka	47	2				10	22/02/2013	27/05/2016
198	Joe Wheeler	61	1				5	22/02/2013	03/06/2017
199	Tony Woodcock	12	1				5	22/02/2013	12/07/2013
200	Jake Paringatai	6						09/03/2013	12/07/2013
201	Brad Thorn	19	1				5	09/03/2013	11/04/2014
202	Jason Emery	35	2				10	15/03/2013	02/07/2016
203	TJ Ioane	18						15/03/2013	10/05/2014
204	Frae Wilson	1						22/03/2013	22/03/2013
205	Mose Tuiali'i	9	1				5	05/04/2013	12/07/2013
206	Tony Ensor	1						20/04/2013	20/04/2013
207	Maritino Nemani	3						11/05/2013	25/05/2013
208	Trent Renata	10	1	2			9	01/06/2013	27/06/2015
209	Richard Buckman	50	11				55	22/02/2014	05/04/2019
210	Shane Christie	29	2				10	22/02/2014	22/07/2016
211	Gareth Evans	53	7				35	22/02/2014	24/04/2022
212	Malakai Fekitoa	66	20				100	22/02/2014	22/07/2017
213	Kane Hames	20	1				5	22/02/2014	01/05/2015
214	Patrick Osborne	54	19				95	22/02/2014	13/06/2017
215	Ged Robinson	15	1				5	22/02/2014	19/07/2014
216	Matías Díaz	9						01/03/2014	19/07/2014
217	Craig Millar	10						01/03/2014	04/03/2017
218	Winston Stanley	1						01/03/2014	01/03/2014
219	Tom Franklin	85	5				25	10/05/2014	21/06/2019
220	Sam Anderson-Heather	1						24/05/2014	24/05/2014
221	Lee Allan	2						27/06/2014	06/07/2014
222	J. P. Koen	3						06/07/2014	19/07/2014
223	Ash Dixon	100	13				65	21/02/2015	19/06/2021
224	Ross Geldenhuys	20						21/02/2015	30/07/2016
225	Josh Hohneck	54						21/02/2015	22/05/2022
226	Waisake Naholo	62	45				225	21/02/2015	21/06/2019
227	Dan Pryor	35	6				30	21/02/2015	22/06/2018
228	Mark Reddish	23	1				5	21/02/2015	22/07/2016
229	Marty Banks	51	2	58	38	1	243	27/02/2015	04/06/2022
230	Brendon Edmonds	24	1				5	27/02/2015	01/04/2016
231	Pingi Tala'apitaga	7						14/03/2015	05/06/2015
232	Daniel Lienert-Brown	138	6				30	20/03/2015	23/05/2026
233	James Lentjes	69	7				35	28/03/2015	20/05/2023
234	Joe Latta	6	1				5	24/04/2015	20/06/2015
235	Josh Renton	11						24/04/2015	14/07/2018
236	Alex Ainley	40						16/05/2015	14/07/2018
237	Ryan Tongia	4	4				20	16/05/2015	02/07/2016
238	Scott Eade	1						05/06/2015	05/06/2015
239	Jackson Hemopo	39	1				5	12/06/2015	21/06/2019
240	Matt Faddes	46	20				100	26/02/2016	25/05/2019
241	Liam Squire	35	7				35	26/02/2016	05/03/2021
242	Teihorangi Walden	39	10				50	26/02/2016	13/06/2020
243	Siua Halanukonuka	28						05/03/2016	22/07/2017
244	Luke Whitelock	53	4				20	05/03/2016	21/06/2019
245	Rob Thompson	57	14				70	12/03/2016	19/07/2020
246	Jack Wilson	5	2				10	26/03/2016	02/07/2016
247	Greg Pleasants-Tate	18	4				20	30/04/2016	14/07/2018
248	Aki Seiuli	40	5				25	07/05/2016	21/07/2018
249	Te Aihe Toma	3						02/07/2016	30/07/2016
250	Jamie Booth	1						02/07/2016	02/07/2016
251	Fletcher Smith	16	2	6	4		34	02/07/2016	28/04/2018
252	Kayne Hammington	54	4				20	24/02/2017	04/06/2022
253	Tevita Li	38	12				60	24/02/2017	14/06/2019
254	Guy Millar	6						24/02/2017	06/07/2018
255	Adrian Smith	2						24/02/2017	20/05/2017
256	Siate Tokolahi	68	3				15	24/02/2017	19/06/2021
257	Sekonaia Pole	3						04/03/2017	18/03/2017
258	Dillon Hunt	44	6				30	11/03/2017	15/08/2020
259	Sio Tomkinson	43	14				70	25/03/2017	19/06/2021
260	Tupou Sopoaga	1						31/03/2017	31/03/2017
261	Josh Dickson	57	5				25	13/06/2017	14/05/2023
262	Tyrel Lomax	31	3				15	23/02/2018	21/06/2019
263	Shannon Frizell	68	19				95	09/03/2018	02/06/2023
264	Marino Mikaele-Tu'u	48	6				30	09/03/2018	02/06/2023
265	Tevita Nabura	3						09/03/2018	19/05/2018
266	Kalolo Tuiloma	10						17/03/2018	21/07/2018
267	Josh Ioane	43	7	55	28		229	24/03/2018	19/06/2021
268	Josh McKay	16	5				25	26/05/2018	15/08/2020
269	Pari Pari Parkinson	41	2				10	22/06/2018	19/04/2024
270	Thomas Umaga-Jensen	42	6				30	22/06/2018	30/05/2025
271	Ayden Johnstone	50	1				5	15/02/2019	18/05/2024
272	Jack Whetton	13						22/02/2019	15/08/2020
273	Folau Fakatava	72	12				60	01/03/2019	15/05/2026
274	Bryn Gatland	8		3		1	9	01/03/2019	12/07/2020
275	Josh Iosefa-Scott	2						01/03/2019	07/02/2020
276	Ricky Jackson	5	1				5	01/03/2019	19/04/2024
277	Ray Niuia	1						22/03/2019	22/03/2019
278	Jordan Hyland	4	1				5	20/04/2019	25/05/2019
279	Sef Fa'agase	3						26/04/2019	07/06/2019
280	Dan Hollinshead	2		2			4	18/05/2019	25/05/2019
281	Teariki Ben-Nicholas	13	2				10	07/02/2020	19/06/2021
282	Michael Collins	22	8				40	07/02/2020	19/06/2021
283	Tima Fainga'anuku	2						07/02/2020	07/03/2020
284	Mitch Hunt	52	6	53	37		247	07/02/2020	02/06/2023
285	Jona Nareki	60	24				120	07/02/2020	23/05/2026
286	Jesse Parete	9						07/02/2020	09/08/2020
287	Conán O'Donnell	2						15/02/2020	21/02/2020
288	Kirisi Kuridrani	1						21/02/2020	21/02/2020
289	Scott Gregory	33	8				40	28/02/2020	02/06/2023
290	Manaaki Selby-Rickit	21	1				5	28/02/2020	08/04/2022
291	Jeff Thwaites	14						28/02/2020	30/05/2021
292	Ngane Punivai	14	4				20	07/03/2020	26/03/2022
293	Sam Gilbert	57	14	80	33		329	13/06/2020	30/05/2025
294	Vilimoni Koroi	4		1			2	13/06/2020	29/05/2022
295	Ethan de Groot	76	7				35	19/07/2020	23/05/2026
296	Tom Florence	1						15/08/2020	15/08/2020
297	Solomon Alaimalo	2						26/02/2021	05/03/2021
298	Bryn Evans	24	1				5	26/02/2021	04/06/2022
299	Connor Garden-Bachop	35	7				35	26/02/2021	01/06/2024
300	Billy Harmon	47	6				30	26/02/2021	08/06/2024
301	Jack Regan	2						26/02/2021	05/03/2021
302	Hugh Renton	46	5				25	26/02/2021	23/05/2026
303	Kazuki Himeno	11	2				10	26/03/2021	19/06/2021
304	Freedom Vahaakolo	3						26/03/2021	24/04/2022
305	Caleb Makene	1						02/04/2021	02/04/2021
306	Nehe Milner-Skudder	1						30/04/2021	30/04/2021
307	Tim O'Malley	1						14/05/2021	14/05/2021
308	James Arscott	19						05/06/2021	22/03/2025
309	Jermaine Ainsley	38	1				5	19/02/2022	08/06/2024
310	Mosese Dawai	13	4				20	19/02/2022	08/04/2023
311	Rhys Marshall	18	4				20	19/02/2022	02/06/2023
312	Fetuli Paea	23	2				10	19/02/2022	02/06/2023
313	Josh Timu	10	3				15	19/02/2022	30/03/2024
314	Liam Coombes-Fabling	6	1				5	05/03/2022	04/06/2022
315	Saula Ma'u	58	2				10	05/03/2022	23/05/2026
316	Andrew Makalio	23	6				30	11/03/2022	02/06/2023
317	Fabian Holland	34	1				5	26/03/2022	30/05/2025
318	Denny Solomona	6						01/04/2022	04/06/2022
319	Sean Withy	54	3				15	01/04/2022	23/05/2026
320	Max Hicks	21	1				5	08/04/2022	08/06/2024
321	Sam Caird	3						24/04/2022	22/05/2022
322	Christian Lio-Willie	2						24/04/2022	30/04/2022
323	Luca Inch	1						22/05/2022	22/05/2022
324	Rory van Vugt	2	1				5	22/05/2022	29/05/2022
325	Leni Apisai	7						04/06/2022	20/05/2023
326	Martín Bogado	9	2				10	25/02/2023	18/05/2024
327	Freddie Burns	9		5	2		16	25/02/2023	02/06/2023
328	Kemara Hauiti-Parapara	3						25/02/2023	10/03/2023
329	Jonah Lowe	34	16				80	25/02/2023	23/05/2026
330	Will Tucker	11						25/02/2023	01/06/2024
331	Nikora Broughton	31	3				15	03/03/2023	15/05/2026
332	Jake Te Hiwi	11						10/03/2023	26/04/2025
333	Finn Hurley	9	2				10	19/03/2023	17/04/2026
334	Cam Millar	33	2	47	28		201	19/03/2023	23/05/2026
335	PJ Sheck	1						19/03/2023	19/03/2023
336	Jack Taylor	37	3				15	25/03/2023	23/05/2026
337	Nathan Hastie	12	1				5	22/04/2023	04/05/2025
338	Matt Whaanga	6	1				5	26/05/2023	08/06/2024
339	Henry Bell	26						24/02/2024	23/05/2026
340	Oliver Haig	32						24/02/2024	23/05/2026
341	Rhys Patchell	6	2				10	24/02/2024	27/04/2024
342	Jacob Ratumaitavuki-Kneepkens	34	14				70	24/02/2024	23/05/2026
343	Timoci Tavatavanawai	42	9				45	24/02/2024	23/05/2026
344	Tanielu Teleʻa	33	8				40	24/02/2024	15/05/2026
345	Ajay Faleafaga	12	2	1			12	01/03/2024	28/03/2025
346	Tom Sanders	5						08/03/2024	01/06/2024
347	Rohan Wingham	8						30/03/2024	27/03/2026
348	Hugo Plummer	2						13/04/2024	19/04/2024
349	Will Stodart	22						13/04/2024	15/05/2026
350	Mitchell Dunshea	29	1				5	27/04/2024	23/05/2026
351	Solomone Tukuafu	1						27/04/2024	27/04/2024
352	Hayden Michaels	1						01/06/2024	01/06/2024
353	Michael Manson	3						14/02/2025	05/04/2025
354	Lui Naeata	2						14/02/2025	22/02/2025
355	Taine Robinson	15	1	6	4		29	14/02/2025	15/05/2026
356	Caleb Tangitau	18	13				65	14/02/2025	15/05/2026
357	Soane Vikena	20	1				5	14/02/2025	02/05/2026
358	Veveni Lasaqa	26	7				35	14/02/2025	15/05/2026
359	Sefo Kautai	17	2				10	14/02/2025	20/03/2026
360	Josh Bartlett	18						28/02/2025	26/04/2026
361	TK Howden	24						28/02/2025	23/05/2026
362	Adam Lennox	21	5				25	28/03/2025	23/05/2026
363	Michael Loft	5						28/03/2025	30/05/2025
364	Taniela Filimone	5	2				10	12/04/2025	30/05/2025
365	Tai Cribb	4						12/04/2025	20/03/2026
366	Josh Whaanga	1						26/04/2025	26/04/2025
367	Lucas Casey	11	3				15	13/02/2026	23/05/2026
368	Angus Taʻavao	12	2				10	13/02/2026	23/05/2026
369	Reesjan Pasitoa	7		5	2		16	13/02/2026	27/03/2026
370	Tomás Lavanini	6						14/03/2026	23/05/2026
371	Andrew Knewstubb	2						20/03/2026	27/03/2026
372	Nic Shearer	3	1				5	27/03/2026	23/05/2026
373	Xavier Tito-Harris	5	1				5	17/04/2026	23/05/2026
374	Meihana Grindlay	1						23/05/2026	23/05/2026
375	Stanley Solomon	1						23/05/2026	23/05/2026
