= 2013 Māori All Blacks tour of North America =

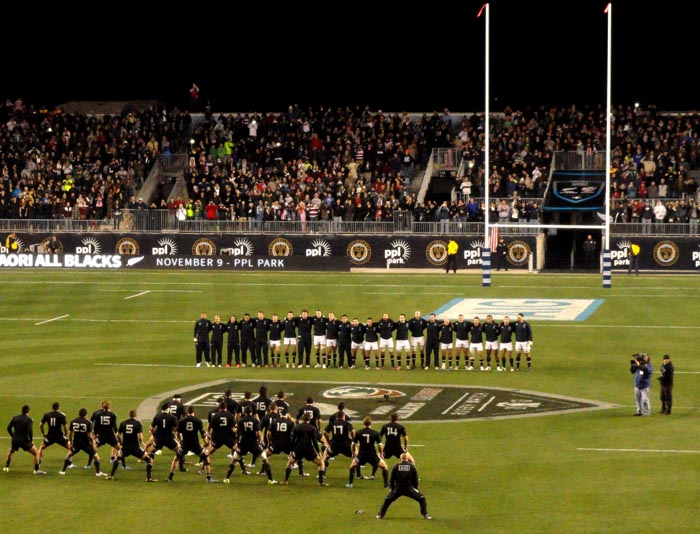
- Māori All Blacks performing their haka prior to their match against the United States team in Philadelphia in 2013
- Date: 3 – 9 November
- Coach: (New Zealand) Colin Cooper
- Tour captain: Tim Bateman
- Top point scorer: Robbie Robinson (18)
- Top try scorer: Jamison Gibson-Park (3)

Tour chronology
- ← 2012 2014 →

On 23 May 2013, it was announced by the New Zealand Rugby Union that following a successful tour in 2012, the Māori All Blacks would tour North America to take on Canada and the United States. The fixtures would not be the first time the national sides have met the invitational side, as the teams participated in the now defunct Churchill Cup, and the Māoris faced Canada during their 2012 tour where the Māoris were victorious 32-19.

The head coach for the tour was announced as Taranaki's head coach Colin Cooper. He was assisted by Crusaders assistant coach Tabai Matson, and former All Black Carl Hoeft as the scrummage coach.

== Fixtures ==
=== Canada ===
3 November 2013
13:00 EDT (UTC-4)

Canada	15–40	(Māori people) Māori All Blacks
Try: Hassler 5' m Carpenter 59' c Con: Underwood (1/2) 60'; Pen: Underwood (1/2) 55'	Report	Try: Guildford 14' m Gibson-Park (2) 30' c, 50' c Robinson 35' c Proctor 69' c Barrett 75' c Con: Taylor (2/3) 31', 37'; Robinson (2/2) 51', 70'; West (1/1) 76'; Pen: Taylor (0/1)

BMO Field, Toronto
Attendance: 22,566
Referee: Federico Anselmi (Argentina)

Canada	Māori All Blacks

FB	15	Matt Evans
RW	14	Jeff Hassler
OC	13	Ciaran Hearn	(substituted off) 40'
IC	12	Harry Jones
LW	11	Conor Trainor
FH	10	Liam Underwood	(substituted off) 67'
SH	9	Phil Mack	(substituted off) 52'
N8	8	Aaron Carpenter (c)
OF	7	John Moonlight
BF	6	Nanyak Dala	(substituted off) 38'
RL	5	Tyler Ardron
LL	4	Jon Phelan	(substituted off) 68'
TP	3	Doug Wooldridge	(substituted off) 64'
HK	2	Ray Barkwill	(substituted off) 74'
LP	1	Hubert Buydens
Replacements:
PR	16	Jake Ilnicki	(substituted on) 64'
PR	17	Ryan March
LK	18	Aaron Flagg	(substituted on) 68'
FL	19	Kyle Gilmour	(substituted on) 74'
FL	20	Adam Kleeberger	(substituted on) 38'
SH	21	Jamie Mackenzie	(substituted on) 52'
CE	22	Pat Parfrey	(substituted on) 67'
FH	23	Connor Braid	(substituted on) 40'
Coach:
(New Zealand) Kieran Crowley

FB	15	Robbie Robinson	(substituted off) 72'
RW	14	Andre Taylor
OC	13	Charlie Ngatai
IC	12	Jackson Willison	(substituted off) 72'
LW	11	Zac Guildford	(substituted off) 64'
FH	10	Tim Bateman (c)
SH	9	Jamison Gibson-Park
N8	8	Elliot Dixon
OF	7	Luke Braid	(substituted off) 53'
BF	6	Liam Squire
RL	5	Joe Wheeler	(substituted off) 66'
LL	4	Jarrad Hoeata
TP	3	Ben Afeaki	(substituted off) 70'
HK	2	Hika Elliot	(substituted off) 22'
LP	1	Kane Hames	(substituted off) 66'
Replacements:
PR	16	Chris Eves	(substituted on) 66'
PR	17	Nick Barrett	(substituted on) 70'
HK	18	Ash Dixon	(substituted on) 22'
N8	19	Blade Thomson	(substituted on) 66'
FL	20	Shane Christie	(substituted on) 53'
FB	21	Kurt Baker	(substituted on) 72'
FH	22	Ihaia West	(substituted on) 72'
WG	23	Matt Proctor	(substituted on) 64'
Coach:
(New Zealand) Colin Cooper

Man of the Match:
Zac Guildford (Māori All Blacks)

Touch judges:
USA Appt (United States)
USA Appt (United States)
Television match official:
USA Appt (United States)

=== United States ===
9 November 2013
19:00 EST (UTC-5)

United States	19–29	(Māori people) Māori All Blacks
Try: Dolan 71' c Con: Siddall (1/1) 73'; Pen: Siddall (4/4) 14', 26', 38', 63'	Report	Try: Gibson-Park 5' c Bateman (2) 43' c, 55' m Katene 78' c Con: Robinson (3/4) 6', 44', 79'; Pen: Robinson (1/1) 69'

PPL Park, Chester, Pennsylvania
Attendance: 18,500
Referee: Chris Assmus (Canada)

United States	Māori All Blacks

FB	15	Adam Siddall
RW	14	Luke Hume
OC	13	Seamus Kelly
IC	12	Andrew Suniula	(substituted off) 64'
LW	11	Tim Maupin
FH	10	Toby L'Estrange	(substituted off) 48'
SH	9	Mike Petri
N8	8	Cam Dolan
OF	7	Peter Dahl
BF	6	Todd Clever (c)	48' to 50'
RL	5	Tai Tuisamoa
LL	4	Graham Harriman
TP	3	Shawn Pittman	(substituted off) 48'
HK	2	Phil Thiel	(substituted off) 75'
LP	1	Nicholas Wallace
Replacements:
HK	16	Zach Fenoglio	(substituted on) 75'
PR	17	Titi Lamositele	(substituted on) 48'
PR	18	Olive Kilifi
LK	19	John Cullen
FL	20	Kyle Sumsion	(substituted on) 48'	(substituted off) 48'
SH	21	Shaun Davies
WG	22	Zachary Pangelinan	(substituted on) 48'
FH	23	Folau Niua	(substituted on) 64'
Coach:
(United States) Mike Tolkin

FB	15	Robbie Robinson
RW	14	Kurt Baker		(substituted off) 66'
OC	13	Charlie Ngatai
IC	12	Tim Bateman (c)
LW	11	Matt Proctor
FH	10	Ihaia West
SH	9	Jamison Gibson-Park
N8	8	Blade Thomson		(substituted off) 63'
OF	7	Luke Braid
BF	6	Shane Christie
RL	5	Joe Wheeler	(yellow card) 31' to 41'	(substituted off) 41'
LL	4	Jarrad Hoeata
TP	3	Ben Afeaki		(substituted off) 79'
HK	2	Ash Dixon		(substituted off) 69'
LP	1	Kane Hames		(substituted off) 47'
Replacements:
HK	16	Joe Royal		(substituted on) 69'
PR	17	Chris Eves		(substituted on) 47'
PR	18	Nick Barrett		(substituted on) 79'
LK	19	Luke Katene		(substituted on) 41'
N8	20	Elliot Dixon		(substituted on) 63'
SH	21	Chris Smylie
CE	22	Jackson Willison
WG	23	Zac Guildford		(substituted on) 66'
Coach:
(New Zealand) Colin Cooper

Man of the Match:
Cameron Dolan (United States)

Touch judges:
David Smortchevsky (Canada)
Andrew McMaster (Canada)
Television match official:
Bryan Arclero (Canada)

== Squad ==
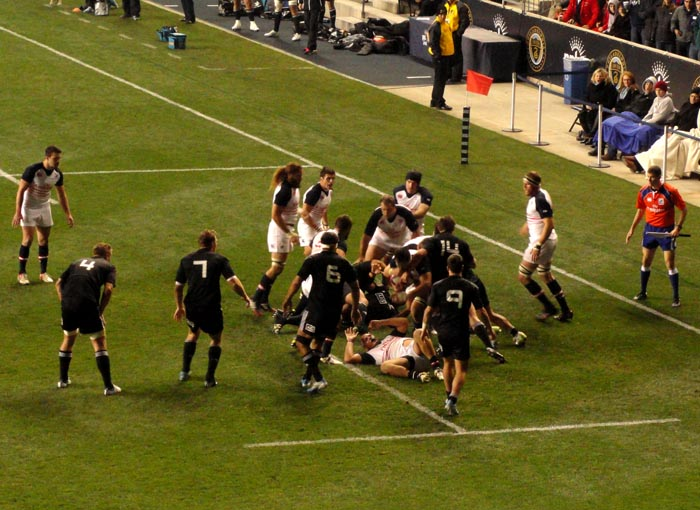
Action at PPL Park against the United States.

New Zealand Māori 29-man squad for the 2013 North America November Tour, facing Canada (3 November) and United States (9 November).

- Head coach: (New Zealand) Colin Cooper

Note: Bold denotes players that have represented the Māori All Blacks in previous tours.
Note: Flags indicate national union as has been defined under IRB eligibility rules. Players may hold more than one non-IRB nationality.

Player	Position	Date of birth (age)	Club/province	Iwi
Ash Dixon	Hooker	1 September 1988 (age 37)	(New Zealand) Hawke's Bay	Ngāti Tahinga
**Hika Elliot**	Hooker	22 January 1986 (age 40)	(New Zealand) Counties Manukau	Ngāti Awa
**Corey Flynn**	Hooker	5 January 1981 (age 45)	(New Zealand) Canterbury	Ngāi Tahu
**Quentin MacDonald**	Hooker	25 September 1988 (age 37)	(New Zealand) Tasman	Te Whakatōhea / Ngāi Tahu
Joe Royal	Hooker	31 May 1985 (age 40)	(New Zealand) Bay of Plenty	Te Arawa / Ngāti Whātua
**Ben Afeaki**	Prop	12 January 1988 (age 38)	(New Zealand) North Harbour	Ngāti Awa
Nick Barrett	Prop	1 November 1988 (age 37)	(New Zealand) Southland	Ngāti Kahungunu
Chris Eves	Prop	11 December 1987 (age 38)	(New Zealand) Manawatu	Tainui
Kane Hames	Prop	28 August 1988 (age 37)	(New Zealand) Bay of Plenty	Ngāi Tūhoe / Ngāti Porou
**Jarrad Hoeata**	Lock	12 December 1983 (age 42)	(New Zealand) Taranaki	Ngāti Kahungunu / Ngāi Tūhoe
Luke Katene	Lock	4 June 1986 (age 39)	(New Zealand) Canterbury	Ngāti Toa
Joe Wheeler	Lock	20 October 1987 (age 38)	(New Zealand) Tasman	Ngāi Tahu
Luke Braid	Flanker	5 October 1988 (age 37)	(New Zealand) Auckland	Ngāti Rāhiri Tumutumu
**Shane Christie**	Flanker	23 September 1985 (age 40)	(New Zealand) Tasman	Ngāti Kurī
**Elliot Dixon**	Number 8	4 September 1989 (age 36)	(New Zealand) Southland	Ngāpuhi
Liam Squire	Number 8	20 March 1991 (age 35)	(New Zealand) Tasman	Ngāi Tahu
Blade Thomson	Number 8	4 December 1990 (age 35)	(New Zealand) Taranaki	Ngāpuhi
**Jamison Gibson-Park**	Scrum-half	23 February 1992 (age 34)	(New Zealand) Taranaki	Ngāti Porou / Ngāi Tai
**Chris Smylie**	Scrum-half	22 March 1982 (age 44)	(New Zealand) Taranaki	Ngāti Mutunga
**Piri Weepu**	Scrum-half	7 September 1983 (age 42)	(New Zealand) Auckland	Te Whakatōhea / Ngāi Tahu
Ihaia West	Fly-half	16 January 1992 (age 34)	(New Zealand) Hawke's Bay	Ngati Kahungunu / Ngāti Porou
**Tim Bateman** (c)	Centre	3 June 1987 (age 38)	(New Zealand) Wellington	Ngāi Tahu
**Charlie Ngatai**	Centre	17 August 1990 (age 35)	(New Zealand) Wellington	Ngāti Porou / Te Whanau-a-Apanui
**Jackson Willison**	Centre	5 September 1988 (age 37)	(New Zealand) Waikato	Ngāti Mahuta
Zac Guildford	Wing	8 February 1989 (age 37)	(New Zealand) Hawke's Bay	Ngāti Kahungunu / Ngāi Tahu
Matt Proctor	Wing	26 October 1992 (age 33)	(New Zealand) Wellington	Ngāi Te Rangi / Ngāpuhi
**Kurt Baker**	Fullback	7 October 1988 (age 37)	(New Zealand) Taranaki	Ngāpuhi
**Robbie Robinson**	Fullback	22 August 1989 (age 36)	(New Zealand) Southland	Ngāti Tuwharetoa
**Andre Taylor**	Fullback	11 January 1988 (age 38)	(New Zealand) Taranaki	Ngāti Tuwharetoa / Ngāti Kahungunu

=== Squad notes ===
Tim Bateman took captaincy from Tanerau Latimer, who has made himself unavailable to have surgery on a long-standing arm injury. Several players were not considered due to injury including Ross Filipo and Bronson Murray. Ash Dixon replaced Corey Flynn after being ruled out of the tour through injury. Hika Elliot and Piri Weepu sustained injuries during the North American Tour and were replaced by Quentin MacDonald and Chris Smylie.

=== Player statistics ===
Key

- Con: Conversions
- Pen: Penalties
- DG: Drop goals
- Pts: Points

Name	Overall						Cards	
Name	Played	Tries	Con	Pen	DG	Pts	Temporarily suspended	Sent off (straight red)
Robbie Robinson	2	1	5	1	0	18	0	0
Jamison Gibson-Park	2	3	0	0	0	15	0	0
Tim Bateman	2	2	0	0	0	10	0	0
Nick Barrett	2	1	0	0	0	5	0	0
Zac Guildford	2	1	0	0	0	5	0	0
Matt Proctor	2	1	0	0	0	5	0	0
Luke Katene	1	1	0	0	0	5	0	0
Andre Taylor	1	0	2	0	0	4	0	0
Ihaia West	2	0	1	0	0	2	0	0
Ben Afeaki	2	0	0	0	0	0	0	0
Kurt Baker	2	0	0	0	0	0	0	0
Luke Braid	2	0	0	0	0	0	0	0
Shane Christie	2	0	0	0	0	0	0	0
Ash Dixon	2	0	0	0	0	0	0	0
Elliot Dixon	2	0	0	0	0	0	0	0
Chris Eves	2	0	0	0	0	0	0	0
Jarrad Hoeata	2	0	0	0	0	0	0	0
Kane Hames	2	0	0	0	0	0	0	0
Charlie Ngatai	2	0	0	0	0	0	0	0
Blade Thomson	2	0	0	0	0	0	0	0
Joe Wheeler	2	0	0	0	0	0	1	0
Hika Elliot	1	0	0	0	0	0	0	0
Joe Royal	1	0	0	0	0	0	0	0
Liam Squire	1	0	0	0	0	0	0	0
Jackson Willison	1	0	0	0	0	0	0	0
Corey Flynn	–	–	–	–	–	0	–	–
Piri Weepu	–	–	–	–	–	0	–	–
