= 2014 Māori All Blacks tour of Japan =

Rugby union match series

- Date: 1 – 8 November
- Coach: (New Zealand) Colin Cooper
- Tour captain: Charlie Ngatai
- Top point scorer: Ihaia West (31)
- Top try scorer(s): Jason Emery (2); Nehe Milner-Skudder (2)

Tour chronology
- ← 2013

On 7 July 2014, it was announced by the New Zealand Rugby Union that the Māori All Blacks would play a three-match Asian Series, including two matches against the Japanese national team and a match against an invitational Asian Pacific Barbarians (APB) team - a side made up from top Asian and Polynesian players and coached by Tana Umaga. The APB match was set to take place at the newly opened National Stadium in Singapore, but due to concerns over the safety of the playing surface at the stadium, the match was cancelled on 21 October 2014. For Japan, the second a third meeting between the two teams goes ahead a scheduled with the 2013 tour coach Colin Cooper remaining as head coach.

== Matches ==
=== First match ===
1 November 2014
14:00 JST (UTC+9)

| Japan | 21–61 | (Māori people) Māori All Blacks |
| Try: Penalty try (2) 25' c, 73' c Mafi 52' c Con: Goromaru (3/3) 27', 53', 73' | Report | Try: Eves 7' m Emery (2) 20' c, 34' c Polwart 23' c West 46' c Milner-Skudder 55' m Ngatai 63' c Lowe 76' c Con: West (6/8) 21', 24', 35', 47', 64', 77'; Pen: West (3/5) 14', 17', 40' |

Noevir Stadium, Kobe
Attendance: 21,234
Referee: Luke Pearce (England)

| FB | 15 | Ayumu Goromaru |
| RW | 14 | Kotaro Matsushima |
| OC | 13 | Harumichi Tatekawa | (substituted off) 60' |
| IC | 12 | Male Sa'u |
| LW | 11 | Akihito Yamada | (substituted off) 53' |
| FH | 10 | Yuu Tamura | (substituted off) 40' |
| SH | 9 | Atsushi Hiwasa |
| N8 | 8 | Hayden Hopgood | (substituted off) 49' |
| OF | 7 | Michael Leitch (c) |
| BF | 6 | Hendrik Tui |
| RL | 5 | Shoji Ito | (substituted off) 53' |
| LL | 4 | Luke Thompson |
| TP | 3 | Kensuke Hatakeyama | (substituted off) 64' |
| HK | 2 | Takeshi Kizu | (substituted off) 70' |
| LP | 1 | Masataka Mikami | (substituted off) 17' |
Replacements:
| PR | 16 | Keita Inagaki | (substituted on) 17' |
| HK | 17 | Hiroki Yuhara | (substituted on) 70' |
| PR | 18 | Shinnosuke Kakinaga | (substituted on) 64' |
| LK | 19 | Shinya Makabe | (substituted on) 53' |
| N8 | 20 | Amanaki Mafi | (substituted on) 49' |
| SH | 21 | Keisuke Uchida | (substituted on) 60' |
| FH | 22 | Kosei Ono | (substituted on) 40' |
| WG | 23 | Karne Hesketh | (substituted on) 53' |
Coach:
(Australia) Eddie Jones

| FB | 15 | Robbie Robinson | (substituted off) 56' |
| RW | 14 | Matt Proctor |
| OC | 13 | Jason Emery | (substituted off) 54' |
| IC | 12 | Charlie Ngatai (c) |
| LW | 11 | James Lowe |
| FH | 10 | Ihaia West |
| SH | 9 | Chris Smylie | (substituted off) 56' |
| N8 | 8 | Elliot Dixon | (substituted off) 49' |
| OF | 7 | Sean Polwart |
| BF | 6 | Blade Thomson |
| RL | 5 | Hayden Triggs | (substituted off) 53' |
| LL | 4 | Tom Franklin |
| TP | 3 | Mike Kainga | (substituted off) 59' |
| HK | 2 | Ash Dixon | (substituted off) 22' |
| LP | 1 | Chris Eves | (substituted off) 65' |
Replacements:
| HK | 16 | Codie Taylor | (substituted on) 22' |
| PR | 17 | Joe Royal | (substituted on) 65' |
| PR | 18 | Nick Barrett | (substituted on) 59' |
| FL | 19 | Nick Crosswell | (substituted on) 53' |
| FL | 20 | Dan Pryor | (substituted on) 49' |
| SH | 21 | Jamison Gibson-Park | (substituted on) 56' |
| FH | 22 | Marty McKenzie | (substituted on) 56' |
| WG | 23 | Nehe Milner-Skudder | (substituted on) 54' |
Coach:
(New Zealand) Colin Cooper

Touch judges:
Angus Gardner (Australia)
James Leckie (Australia)
Television match official:
George Ayoub (Australia)

=== Second match ===
8 November 2014
14:00 JST (UTC+9)

| Japan | 18–20 | (Māori people) Māori All Blacks |
| Try: Yamada 38' m Penalty try 47' c Con: Goromaru (1/2) 48'; Pen: Goromaru (2/3) 54', 72' | Report | Try: Taylor 16' c Milner-Skudder 22' m Pryor 80' m Con: West (1/2) 17'; Pen: West (1/2) 31' |

Chichibunomiya Rugby Stadium, Tokyo
Attendance: 20,515
Referee: Angus Gardner (Australia)

| FB | 15 | Ayumu Goromaru |
| RW | 14 | Karne Hesketh |
| OC | 13 | Kotaro Matsushima |
| IC | 12 | Male Sa'u | (substituted off) 73' |
| LW | 11 | Akihito Yamada | (substituted off) 48' |
| FH | 10 | Kosei Ono |
| SH | 9 | Atsushi Hiwasa |
| N8 | 8 | Amanaki Mafi |
| OF | 7 | Michael Leitch (c) | (substituted off) 75' |
| BF | 6 | Hendrik Tui |
| RL | 5 | Shinya Makabe | (substituted off) 65' |
| LL | 4 | Luke Thompson |
| TP | 3 | Kensuke Hatakeyama |
| HK | 2 | Takeshi Kizu | (substituted off) 58' |
| LP | 1 | Keita Inagaki |
Replacements:
| PR | 16 | Yusuke Nagae |
| HK | 17 | Hiroki Yuhara | (substituted on) 58' |
| PR | 18 | Shinnosuke Kakinaga |
| LK | 19 | Hitoshi Ono | (substituted on) 65' |
| N8 | 20 | Hayden Hopgood | (substituted on) 75' |
| SH | 21 | Keisuke Uchida |
| FH | 22 | Harumichi Tatekawa | (substituted on) 68' |
| CE | 23 | Ryohei Yamanaka | (substituted on) 73' |
Coach:
(Australia) Eddie Jones

| FB | 15 | Nehe Milner-Skudder | | (substituted off) 65' |
| RW | 14 | Kurt Baker |
| OC | 13 | Matt Proctor |
| IC | 12 | Charlie Ngatai (c) |
| LW | 11 | James Lowe |
| FH | 10 | Ihaia West | | (substituted off) 58' |
| SH | 9 | Chris Smylie | | (substituted off) 72' |
| N8 | 8 | Elliot Dixon |
| OF | 7 | Sean Polwart | | (substituted off) 46' |
| BF | 6 | Dan Pryor |
| RL | 5 | Blade Thomson |
| LL | 4 | Tom Franklin | (yellow card) 6' to 16' | (substituted off) 58' |
| TP | 3 | Mike Kainga |
| HK | 2 | Codie Taylor | | (substituted off) 72' |
| LP | 1 | Chris Eves | | (substituted off) 58' |
Replacements:
| HK | 16 | Joe Royal | | (substituted on) 72' |
| PR | 17 | Brendon Edmonds | | (substituted on) 58' |
| PR | 18 | Nick Barrett |
| LK | 19 | Hayden Triggs | | (substituted on) 58' |
| N8 | 20 | Mitchell Crosswell | | (substituted on) 46' |
| SH | 21 | Jamison Gibson-Park | | (substituted on) 72' |
| FH | 22 | Marty McKenzie | | (substituted on) 58' |
| WG | 23 | Joe Webber | | (substituted on) 65' |
Coach:
(New Zealand) Colin Cooper

Touch judges:
Luke Pearce (England)
James Leckie (Australia)
Television match official:
George Ayoub (Australia)

=== Asian Pacific Barbarians ===
15 November 2014
14:30 SST (UTC+8)

| Asia Pacific Dragons | Cancelled | (Māori people) Māori All Blacks |

New Singapore National Stadium, Singapore
Referee: ARU Appointment (Australia)

== Squads ==
Note: Caps, ages and clubs are to 1 November, pre first match.

=== Māori All Blacks ===
New Zealand Māori 27-man squad for the 2014 Japanese November Tour was announced on 21 October.

On 26 October, Nick Crosswell, Mitch Crosswell and Hayden Triggs were added to the squad to replace the injured Shane Christie, Liam Squire and Joe Wheeler respectively.

| Player | Position | Date of birth (age) | Club/province | Iwi |
|---|---|---|---|---|
| Ash Dixon | Hooker | 10 September 1988 (aged 26) | (New Zealand) Hawke's Bay | Ngāti Tahinga |
| Joe Royal | Hooker | 31 May 1985 (aged 29) | (New Zealand) Bay of Plenty | Te Arawa / Ngāti Whātua |
| Codie Taylor | Hooker | 31 March 1991 (aged 23) | (New Zealand) Canterbury | Ngāti Kahungunu / Muaūpoko |
| Nick Barrett | Prop | 1 November 1988 (aged 26) | (New Zealand) Auckland | Ngāti Kahungunu |
| Brendon Edmonds | Prop | 28 November 1990 (aged 23) | (New Zealand) Hawke's Bay | Ngāti Kahungunu |
| Chris Eves | Prop | 11 December 1987 (aged 26) | (New Zealand) Manawatu | Tainui |
| Mike Kainga | Prop | 28 January 1991 (aged 23) | (New Zealand) Bay of Plenty | Ngāti Kahungunu |
| Tom Franklin | Lock | 11 August 1990 (aged 24) | (New Zealand) Otago | Ngāti Maniapoto |
| Hayden Triggs | Lock | 22 February 1982 (aged 32) | (New Zealand) North Harbour | Ngāti Kahungunu |
| Joe Wheeler | Lock | 20 October 1987 (aged 27) | (New Zealand) Tasman | Ngāi Tahu |
| Shane Christie | Flanker | 23 September 1985 (aged 29) | (New Zealand) Tasman | Te Āti Haunui-a-Pāpārangi |
| Nick Crosswell | Flanker | 3 April 1986 (aged 28) | (New Zealand) Manawatu | Ngāti Porou |
| Sean Polwart | Flanker | 14 April 1990 (aged 24) | (New Zealand) Auckland | Ngāti Pūkenga / Ngāti Maru |
| Dan Pryor | Flanker | 14 April 1988 (aged 26) | (New Zealand) Northland | Ngāpuhi / Ngāti Pikiao |
| Mitchell Crosswell | Number 8 | 14 November 1988 (aged 25) | (New Zealand) Taranaki | Ngāti Porou |
| Blade Thomson | Number 8 | 4 December 1990 (aged 23) | (New Zealand) Taranaki | Ngāpuhi |
| Liam Squire | Number 8 | 20 March 1991 (aged 23) | (New Zealand) Tasman | Ngāi Tahu |
| Elliot Dixon | Number 8 | 4 September 1989 (aged 25) | (New Zealand) Southland | Ngāpuhi |
| Jamison Gibson-Park | Scrum-half | 23 February 1992 (aged 22) | (New Zealand) Taranaki | Ngāti Porou / Ngāi Tai |
| Chris Smylie | Scrum-half | 22 March 1982 (aged 32) | (New Zealand) Taranaki | Ngāti Mutunga |
| Marty McKenzie | Fly-half | 14 August 1992 (aged 22) | (New Zealand) Taranaki | Ngāti Tūwharetoa |
| Ihaia West | Fly-half | 16 January 1992 (aged 22) | (New Zealand) Hawke's Bay | Ngati Kahungunu / Ngāti Porou |
| Jason Emery | Centre | 21 September 1993 (aged 21) | (New Zealand) Manawatu | Ngāpuhi / Ngāti Maniapoto |
| Charlie Ngatai (c) | Centre | 17 August 1990 (aged 24) | (New Zealand) Taranaki | Ngāti Porou / Te Whanau-a-Apanui |
| James Lowe | Centre | 8 July 1992 (aged 22) | (New Zealand) Tasman | Ngāpuhi / Ngāi Te Rangi |
| Nehe Milner-Skudder | Wing | 15 December 1990 (aged 23) | (New Zealand) Manawatu | Ngāti Porou / Tapuika |
| Matt Proctor | Wing | 26 October 1992 (aged 22) | (New Zealand) Wellington/Hurricanes | Ngāi Te Rangi / Ngāpuhi |
| Joe Webber | Wing | 27 August 1993 (aged 21) | (New Zealand) Waikato | Ngāti Ranginui |
| Kurt Baker | Fullback | 7 October 1988 (aged 26) | (New Zealand) Taranaki/Highlanders | Ngāpuhi |
| Robbie Robinson | Fullback | 22 August 1989 (aged 25) | (New Zealand) Southland/Chiefs | Ngāti Tuwharetoa |

=== Japan ===
Japanese 30-man squad for two uncapped matches against the Māori All Blacks.

Note: Flags indicate national union for the club/province as defined by World Rugby.

| Player | Position | Date of birth (age) | Caps | Club/province |
|---|---|---|---|---|
| Ryuhei Arita | Hooker | 21 March 1989 (aged 25) | 7 | (Japan) Coca-Cola Red Sparks |
| Takeshi Kizu | Hooker | 15 July 1988 (aged 26) | 28 | (Japan) Kobelco Steelers |
| Hiroki Yuhara | Hooker | 21 January 1984 (aged 30) | 16 | (Japan) Toshiba Brave Lupus |
| Kensuke Hatakeyama | Prop | 2 August 1985 (aged 29) | 57 | (Japan) Suntory Sungoliath |
| Keita Inagaki | Prop | 2 June 1990 (aged 24) | 0 | (Japan) Panasonic Wild Knights |
| Shinnosuke Kakinaga | Prop | 19 December 1992 (aged 21) | 0 | (Japan) Suntory Sungoliath |
| Masataka Mikami | Prop | 4 June 1988 (aged 26) | 21 | (Japan) Toshiba Brave Lupus |
| Hiroshi Yamashita | Prop | 1 January 1986 (aged 28) | 36 | (Japan) Kobelco Steelers |
| Shoji Ito | Lock | 2 December 1980 (aged 33) | 26 | (Japan) Kobelco Steelers |
| Shinya Makabe | Lock | 26 March 1987 (aged 27) | 27 | (Japan) Suntory Sungoliath |
| Hitoshi Ono | Lock | 6 May 1978 (aged 36) | 85 | (Japan) Toshiba Brave Lupus |
| Luke Thompson | Lock | 16 April 1981 (aged 33) | 48 | (Japan) Kintetsu Liners |
| Michael Leitch (c) | Flanker | 7 October 1988 (aged 26) | 37 | (Japan) Toshiba Brave Lupus |
| Hendrik Tui | Flanker | 13 December 1987 (aged 26) | 25 | (Australia) Queensland Reds |
| Ryuta Yasui | Flanker | 6 December 1989 (aged 24) | 2 | (Japan) Kobelco Steelers |
| Hayden Hopgood | Number 8 | 30 July 1980 (aged 34) | 1 | (Japan) Kamaishi Seawaves |
| Amanaki Mafi | Number 8 | 11 January 1990 (aged 24) | 0 | (Japan) NTT Communications Shining Arcs |
| Atsushi Hiwasa | Scrum-half | 22 May 1987 (aged 27) | 36 | (Japan) Suntory Sungoliath |
| Yuki Yatomi | Scrum-half | 16 February 1985 (aged 29) | 13 | (Japan) Yamaha Júbilo |
| Kosei Ono | Fly-half | 17 April 1987 (aged 27) | 22 | (Japan) Suntory Sungoliath |
| Harumichi Tatekawa | Fly-half | 2 December 1989 (aged 24) | 26 | (Japan) Kubota Spears |
| Kotaro Matsushima | Centre | 23 February 1993 (aged 21) | 4 | (Japan) Suntory Sungoliath |
| Male Sa'u | Centre | 13 October 1987 (aged 27) | 18 | (Australia) Melbourne Rebels |
| Yuu Tamura | Centre | 9 January 1989 (aged 25) | 25 | (Japan) NEC Green Rockets |
| Craig Wing | Centre | 26 December 1979 (aged 34) | 7 | (Japan) Kobelco Steelers |
| Yoshikazu Fujita | Wing | 8 September 1993 (aged 21) | 18 | (Japan) Waseda University |
| Karne Hesketh | Wing | 1 August 1985 (aged 29) | 0 | (Japan) Fukuoka Sanix Blues |
| Toshiaki Hirose | Wing | 17 October 1981 (aged 33) | 21 | (Japan) Toshiba Brave Lupus |
| Akihito Yamada | Wing | 26 July 1986 (aged 28) | 9 | (Japan) Panasonic Wild Knights |
| Ayumu Goromaru | Fullback | 1 March 1986 (aged 28) | 41 | (Japan) Yamaha Júbilo |

== Statistics ==
Key

- Con: Conversions
- Pen: Penalties
- DG: Drop goals
- Pts: Points

=== Māori All Blacks player statistics ===
| Name | Overall | | | | | | Cards | |
| Name | Played | Tries | Con | Pen | DG | Pts | Temporarily suspended | Sent off (straight red) |
|---|---|---|---|---|---|---|---|---|
| Ihaia West | 2 | 1 | 7 | 4 | 0 | 31 | 0 | 0 |
| Nehe Milner-Skudder | 2 | 2 | 0 | 0 | 0 | 10 | 0 | 0 |
| Jason Emery | 1 | 2 | 0 | 0 | 0 | 10 | 0 | 0 |
| Chris Eves | 2 | 1 | 0 | 0 | 0 | 5 | 0 | 0 |
| James Lowe | 2 | 1 | 0 | 0 | 0 | 5 | 0 | 0 |
| Charlie Ngatai | 2 | 1 | 0 | 0 | 0 | 5 | 0 | 0 |
| Sean Polwart | 2 | 1 | 0 | 0 | 0 | 5 | 0 | 0 |
| Dan Pryor | 2 | 1 | 0 | 0 | 0 | 5 | 0 | 0 |
| Codie Taylor | 2 | 1 | 0 | 0 | 0 | 5 | 0 | 0 |
| Mitchell Crosswell | 2 | 0 | 0 | 0 | 0 | 0 | 0 | 0 |
| Elliot Dixon | 2 | 0 | 0 | 0 | 0 | 0 | 0 | 0 |
| Tom Franklin | 2 | 0 | 0 | 0 | 0 | 0 | 1 | 0 |
| Jamison Gibson-Park | 2 | 0 | 0 | 0 | 0 | 0 | 0 | 0 |
| Mike Kainga | 2 | 0 | 0 | 0 | 0 | 0 | 0 | 0 |
| Marty McKenzie | 2 | 0 | 0 | 0 | 0 | 0 | 1 | 0 |
| Matt Proctor | 2 | 0 | 0 | 0 | 0 | 0 | 0 | 0 |
| Joe Royal | 2 | 0 | 0 | 0 | 0 | 0 | 0 | 0 |
| Chris Smylie | 2 | 0 | 0 | 0 | 0 | 0 | 0 | 0 |
| Hayden Triggs | 2 | 0 | 0 | 0 | 0 | 0 | 0 | 0 |
| Kurt Baker | 1 | 0 | 0 | 0 | 0 | 0 | 0 | 0 |
| Nick Barrett | 1 | 0 | 0 | 0 | 0 | 0 | 0 | 0 |
| Nick Crosswell | 1 | 0 | 0 | 0 | 0 | 0 | 0 | 0 |
| Ash Dixon | 1 | 0 | 0 | 0 | 0 | 0 | 0 | 0 |
| Brendon Edmonds | 1 | 0 | 0 | 0 | 0 | 0 | 0 | 0 |
| Robbie Robinson | 1 | 0 | 0 | 0 | 0 | 0 | 0 | 0 |
| Blade Thomson | 1 | 0 | 0 | 0 | 0 | 0 | 0 | 0 |
| Joe Webber | 1 | 0 | 0 | 0 | 0 | 0 | 0 | 0 |
| Shane Christie | – | – | – | – | – | 0 | – | – |
| Liam Squire | – | – | – | – | – | 0 | – | – |
| Joe Wheeler | – | – | – | – | – | 0 | – | – |

=== Match statistics ===
| Name | Overall | | | | | |
| Name | Team | Tries | Con | Pen | DG | Pts |
|---|---|---|---|---|---|---|
| Ihaia West | Māori All Blacks | 1 | 7 | 4 | 0 | 31 |
| Ayumu Goromaru | Japan | 0 | 4 | 2 | 0 | 14 |
| Nehe Milner-Skudder | Māori All Blacks | 2 | 0 | 0 | 0 | 10 |
| Jason Emery | Māori All Blacks | 2 | 0 | 0 | 0 | 10 |
| Chris Eves | Māori All Blacks | 1 | 0 | 0 | 0 | 5 |
| Amanaki Mafi | Japan | 1 | 0 | 0 | 0 | 5 |
| James Lowe | Māori All Blacks | 1 | 0 | 0 | 0 | 5 |
| Charlie Ngatai | Māori All Blacks | 1 | 0 | 0 | 0 | 5 |
| Sean Polwart | Māori All Blacks | 1 | 0 | 0 | 0 | 5 |
| Dan Pryor | Māori All Blacks | 1 | 0 | 0 | 0 | 5 |
| Codie Taylor | Māori All Blacks | 1 | 0 | 0 | 0 | 5 |
| Akihito Yamada | Japan | 1 | 0 | 0 | 0 | 5 |
