= Keith Cameron =

Keith Cameron may refer to:

- Keith Cameron (rugby union) (born 1978), New Zealand rugby union player
- Keith Cameron (cricketer) (born 1947), Guyanese cricketer
- Keith Cameron (mining engineer) (1902–1967), Australian engineer after whom an Australian history chair at the University College Dublin is named
- Keith Cameron (soil scientist), New Zealand professor who won the Pickering Medal in 2021
