= Dan Pryor =

New Zealand rugby union player (born 1988)

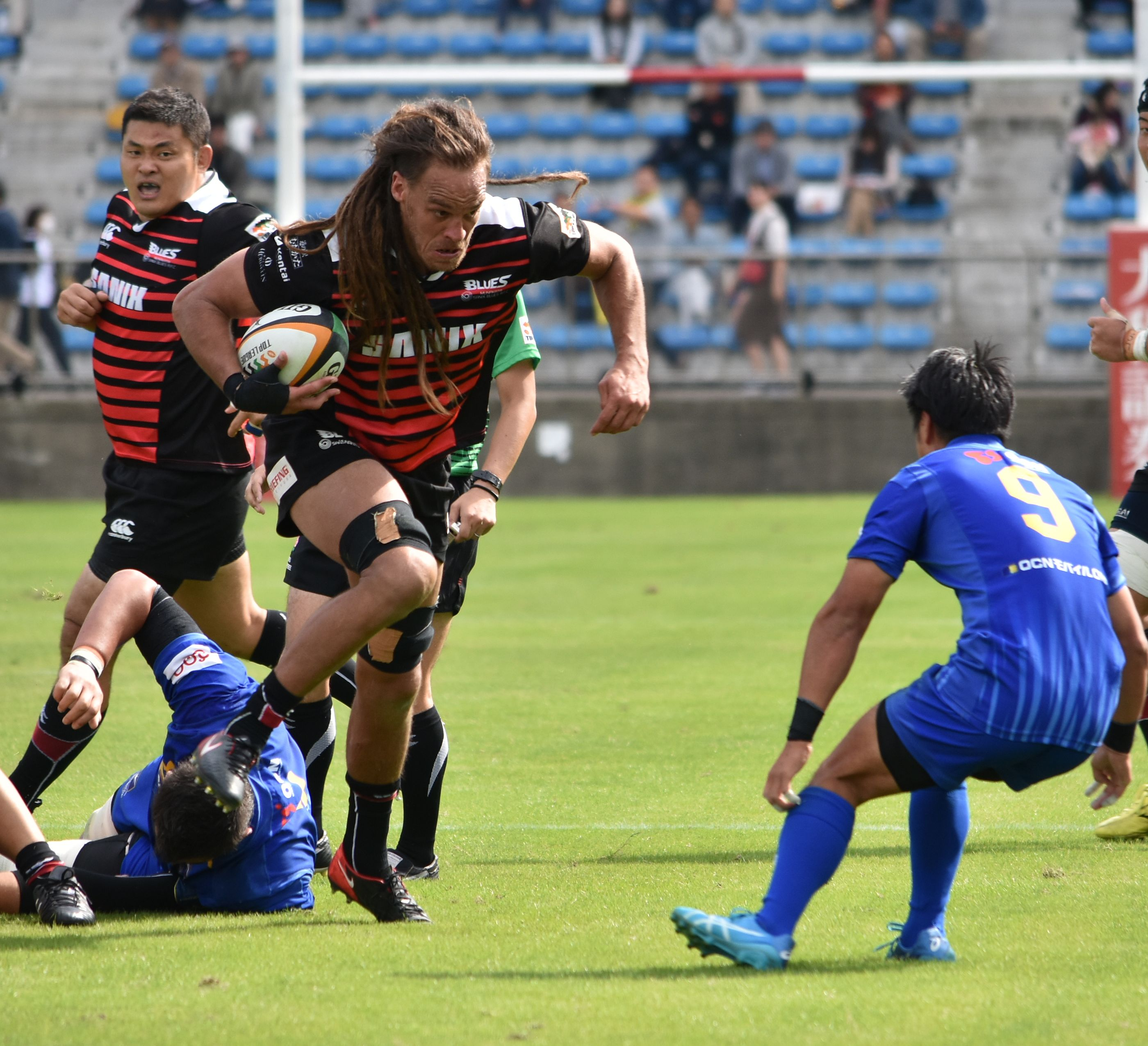
- Pryor in 2018
- Full name: Daniel Pryor
- Born: 14 April 1988 (age 38) Auckland, New Zealand
- Height: 1.90 m (6 ft 3 in)
- Weight: 103 kg (16 st 3 lb; 227 lb)
- School: Auckland Grammar School
- University: Auckland University of Technology
- Notable relative: Kara Pryor (brother)

Rugby union career
- Position: Loose forward
- Current team: Miami Sharks
Senior career
Years	Team	Apps	(Points)
2010–2017	Northland	63	(65)
2012	Blues	1	(0)
2015–2018	Highlanders	35	(30)
2018–2021	Munakata Sanix Blues	23	(25)
2019	Sunwolves	10	(5)
2021–2023	San Diego Legion	24	(25)
2024	Miami Sharks	0	(0)
- Correct as of 28 December 2023
International career
Years	Team	Apps	(Points)
2014, 2017	Māori All Blacks	5	(5)
- Correct as of 28 December 2023

Dan Pryor (born 14 April 1988) is a New Zealand rugby union player who currently plays as a loose forward for the Miami Sharks in Major League Rugby (MLR). He previously played for the San Diego Legion (also in MLR), for Northland in the ITM Cup, for the Highlanders, Blues and Sunwolves in Super Rugby, and for the Munakata Sanix Blues in the Japanese Top League.

Pryor has represented the Maori All Blacks internationally.

== Early career ==
Born and raised in Auckland, Pryor hails from a rugby family with grandfather Albie being an Auckland and Māori All Blacks representative, while brother Kara also went on to become a professional rugby union player. He attended Auckland Grammar School in his home city and played first XV rugby while there. After graduation he began studying towards a degree in business and advertising at the Auckland University of Technology while playing his club rugby for Grammar TEC with whom he won the Gallaher Shield in 2013. He also spent time with the Auckland academy before departing the Auckland club scene in 2014 and joining Marist in the Northland club rugby competition.

== Senior career ==
He started out his senior career playing for the Northland Taniwha during the 2010 ITM Cup and instantly made himself a regular in the side, scoring 3 tries in 8 starts during his debut season of provincial rugby. The Taniwha are traditionally one of the weakest provinces in New Zealand's senior domestic competition and have played in the Championship, the second tier, since the competition was rejigged in 2011. A career highlight for Pryor and his side was the 2014 ITM Cup, where a 3rd-place finish on the Championship log ensured they would appear in the playoffs. Unfortunately his 57th minute try against Hawke's Bay in the semi-finals wasn't enough to inspire his side to victory and they eventually went down 26–21.

After the highs of the 2014 campaign came the lows of the 2015 and 2016 seasons. 2015 saw Northland lose all 10 of their regular season games to finish last on the log and this was also where they would finish in 2016, despite improved performances, a solitary win from 10 games was all they could show for their efforts. Pryor featured 7 times and contributed 1 try in 2015, however injury restricted him to just two appearances in 2016.

== Super Rugby ==
An injury crisis among the Blues loose forwards during the 2012 Super Rugby season saw him get his first experience of rugby at that level making his debut in a 34–23 defeat away to the Rebels on 5 April 2012, however that was to be his only Blues appearance and he wasn't named in their squad for either the 2013 or 2014 seasons.

Following some impressive displays as one of the senior members of a young and inexperienced Northland Taniwha side during the 2014 New Zealand domestic season, he was named in the Dunedin-based Highlanders squad ahead of the 2015 Super Rugby season. His first season with the 'Landers turned out to be a dream with the franchise going on to win the Super Rugby title for the first time in their history after a 21–14 victory over the Hurricanes in the final. Pryor played 17 times out of a possible 19 and contributed 3 tries, however an elbow injury ruled him out of the semi-final and final. He played a further 16 times the following year, however, owing to strong competition among loose forwards such as Shane Christie, Luke Whitelock, Elliot Dixon and Liam Squire, he was only able to start 5 matches as the Highlanders were unable to retain their Super Rugby crown, losing out to the Lions in the semi-finals.

Tony Brown replaced the Japan-bound Jamie Joseph as the Highlanders head coach ahead of the 2017 Super Rugby season and he opted to retain Pryor in the squad for his first season in charge.

== International ==
Pryor was named in the Māori All Blacks squad ahead of the 2014 end-of-year rugby union internationals and debuted in a 61–21 win over Japan in Kobe, coming on to the field as a 49th minute replacement for future Highlanders teammate Elliot Dixon. The following week the same two sides would meet, this time in Tokyo. Pryor started the match in the number 6 jersey and was to score the decisive try in the final minute of the match to secure a dramatic 20–18 win for his side.

== Career Honours ==
Highlanders

- Super Rugby - 2015

== Super Rugby statistics ==
As of 11 January 2017

Season	Team	Games	Starts	Sub	Mins	Tries	Cons	Pens	Drops	Points	Yel	Red
2012	Blues	1	1	0	80	0	0	0	0	0	0	0
2015	Highlanders	17	7	10	752	3	0	0	0	15	0	0
2016	Highlanders	16	5	11	674	3	0	0	0	15	0	0
Total		34	13	21	1506	6	0	0	0	30	0	0
