= Colin Cooper (rugby union) =

New Zealand rugby union coach and player

- Full name: Colin Gary Cooper
- Born: 22 February 1959 (age 67) Waitara, New Zealand
- School: Waitara High School

Rugby union career
- Position(s): Number 8, Lock, Flanker
- Current team: Chiefs
Senior career
| Years | Team | Apps | (Points) |
| 1979–1987 | Taranaki | 101 | (96) |
- Correct as of 27 April 2019
International career
| Years | Team | Apps | (Points) |
| 1982–1983 | New Zealand Māori | 3 | (0) |
| 1982 | New Zealand Juniors | 1 | (0) |
- Correct as of 27 April 2019
Coaching career
- Years: Team
- 1993–1998: Taranaki (assistant)
- 1999–2002: Taranaki
- 2001: New Zealand U21
- 2002: Crusaders (assistant)
- 2003–2010: Hurricanes
- 2005–2007: Junior All Blacks
- 2010–2017: Taranaki
- 2013–2017: Māori All Blacks
- 2018–2019: Chiefs
- Correct as of 27 April 2019

Colin Gary Cooper (born 22 February 1959) is a New Zealand professional rugby union coach and former player. He is the former head coach of the Chiefs. Cooper is a NPC champion and two-time Ranfurly Shield holder, winning with the Taranaki union as a head coach. Cooper has coached the Māori All Blacks to three undefeated tours and won the IRB U21 World Cup with the New Zealand under-21 side. He also accomplished 101 games played for Taranaki.

== Coaching career ==
Eight years after his playing career ended with retirement at Taranaki, Cooper was back with Taranaki, working as an assistant coach from 1995. He went on to fulfil the same role for Taranaki in the 1997 and 1998 seasons, and was then appointed Taranaki head coach in 1999 after Jed Rowlands was appointed to succeed Graham Henry at the Auckland Blues. Cooper remained as head coach from 1999 to 2002. In 2001 he guided the New Zealand Colts side for a season and in 2002 was the assistant coach at the Crusaders. Following the dismissal of Graham Mourie as Hurricanes coach Cooper was appointed to take over the franchise and came to prominence by guiding them to the semi-finals in two of his three seasons in charge. His greatest achievement to date has been taking the side to the 2006 Final, where they were defeated by 19–12. He signed an extension to his contract in 2007, which took him through until 2009. He later stepped down as Hurricanes coach following the 2010 Super 14 season. In 2005 he was appointed to coach one of the All Blacks trial teams and the Junior All Blacks alongside Jamie Joseph. Cooper then returned to Taranaki as head coach in 2010. He instantly achieved success with the province after winning the Ranfurly Shield in 2011 from Southland and defending the shield for 7 defenses. Cooper also took the side to the 2011 and 2012 ITM Cup semi-finals and won the 2014 ITM Cup Premiership.

On 23 July 2013, New Zealand Rugby announced Colin Cooper as the new head coach of the Maori All Blacks.

=== Chiefs ===
Cooper made a return to coaching in Super Rugby, taking over the Chiefs from 2018. In late-December he was confirmed as the new head coach, signed on a three-year deal to replace Dave Rennie, who headed to Glasgow.

== Coaching record ==
| Team | Years | G | W | D | L | W–L % | Honours |
|---|---|---|---|---|---|---|---|
| Taranaki | 1999–2002 | 38 | 17 | 0 | 21 | .447 | * 1× Semifinalist (2000) |
| New Zealand U21 | 2001 | 4 | 4 | 0 | 0 | 1.000 | * 1× U21 World Cup Champion (2001) |
| Hurricanes | 2003–2010 | 104 | 60 | 3 | 41 | .594 | * 1× Super Rugby Runner-up (2006) * 4× Semifinalist (2003, 2005, 2008, 2009) |
| Junior All Blacks | 2005–2007 | 12 | 12 | 0 | 0 | 1.000 | * 2× Pacific Nations Cup Champion (2006, 2007) * 1× Undefeated Tours (2005) |
| Taranaki | 2010–2017 | 91 | 58 | 2 | 31 | .652 | * 1× NPC Champion (2014) * 2× Ranfurly Shield Holder (2011, 2017) * 4× Semifinalist (2012, 2015, 2016, 2017) |
| Māori All Blacks | 2013–2017 | 10 | 7 | 0 | 3 | .700 | * 3× Undefeated Tours (2013, 2014, 2015) |
| Chiefs | 2018–2019 | 0 | 0 | 0 | 0 | – | |
| Total | | 259 | 158 | 5 | 96 | .622 | |
