= Jamison Gibson-Park =

Ireland and British & Irish Lions rugby union player

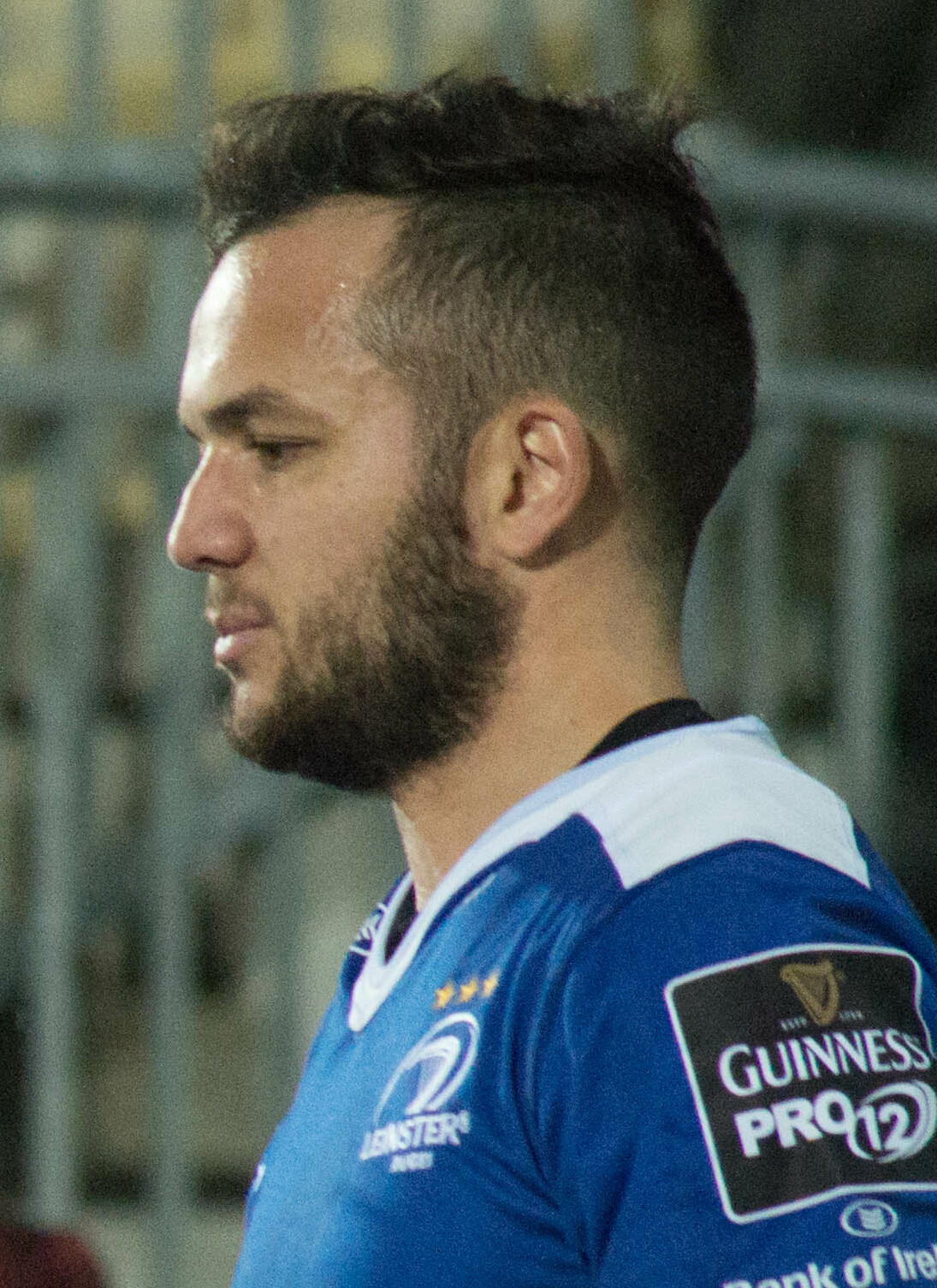
- Gibson-Park in 2016
- Full name: Jamison Ratu Gibson-Park
- Born: 23 February 1992 (age 34) Great Barrier Island, New Zealand
- Height: 1.75 m (5 ft 9 in)
- Weight: 80 kg (176 lb; 12 st 8 lb)
- School: Gisborne Boys' High School

Rugby union career
- Position: Scrum-half
- Current team: Leinster
Senior career
Years	Team	Apps	(Points)
2012–2015	Taranaki	32	(30)
2013–2016	Blues	30	(10)
2016	Hurricanes	13	(0)
2016–	Leinster	163	(175)
- Correct as of 17 January 2026
International career
Years	Team	Apps	(Points)
2012–2015	Māori All Blacks	8	(15)
2020–	Ireland	56	(45)
2025	British & Irish Lions	3	(0)
- Correct as of 21 November 2026

Jamison Ratu Gibson-Park (born 23 February 1992) is a professional rugby union player who plays as a scrum-half for United Rugby Championship club Leinster. Born in New Zealand, he represents Ireland at international level after qualifying on residency grounds. Gibson-Park received full Irish citizenship in December 2023 and holds dual nationality.

== Early life ==
Gibson-Park was born, and spent the first 10 years of his life on Great Barrier Island. From there he moved to Gisborne. He ended up at Gisborne Boys' High School, where he excelled in its first XV, being named in the New Zealand Secondary Schools squad in his final year. He then got picked up out of school by the Taranaki Academy where he moved at the start of 2011.

In 2012, Gibson-Park trialled for the New Zealand under-20 side, but he missed selection.

== Club career ==
=== Taranaki ===
Gibson-Park debuted for Taranaki in 2012, playing the season's first two Ranfurly Shield matches against King Country and Wanganui. He was contracted and made the Taranaki National Provincial Championship squad, making his NPC debut starting at scrum-half against Bay of Plenty. He made an immediate impact with his decisive running and ability to spot a gap. His ability to put a player into space also caught the eye. Gibson-Park was one of the then break-out stars of the 2012 ITM Cup in his debut year for Taranaki, scoring four tries in eleven appearances and was awarded the most promising player of the year ahead of finalists Mitch Brown and Seta Tamanivalu. His performance didn't go unnoticed by the national media or the Super Rugby coaches. He received high praise from television, print and radio commentators and had been named one of the five promising players of the year by the Rugby Almanack.

=== Blues ===
In 2013 he was signed by the Super Rugby side the Blues. He earned his first Super Rugby start in the Blues 21–28 loss to the Bulls in round four of the competition. Gibson-Park was also a part of the Blues team to face France, getting his chance because of injury with All Blacks halfback Piri Weepu.

Gibson-Park had a slow start to the 2014 Super Rugby season because of stress fracture but finished the season appearing in two matches of rounds ten and eighteen coming on as a replacement against the Hurricanes and Crusaders. 2015 was a strong year as he started at halfback majority of the year, who along with Brendon O'Connor were the only players who had played in every game that season for the Auckland franchise. Gibson-Park recorded one try while also being pointed out by many commentators as a key figure for the Blues, in what was his final season.

=== Hurricanes ===
October 2015, Gibson-Park was the last to join the Hurricanes 39-man Super Rugby squad after head coach Chris Boyd looked to fill gaps at halfback after the departure of Chris Smylie to Italy. He joined alongside fellow Taranaki halfback Te Toiroa Tahuriorangi.

=== Leinster ===
On 12 May 2016, Park left New Zealand to join Irish province Leinster in the Pro12 ahead of the 2016–17 season. In September 2017, Gibson-Park and Leinster captain Isa Nacewa were initially denied entry in to South Africa due to visa restrictions. The pair had been due to play two games for Leinster in the Pro14. They missed the first game against Southern Kings but the issue was resolved in time for the second against Cheetahs. He made his 100th appearance for Leinster coming off the bench in a 16–6 victory over Munster in the 2021 Pro14 Grand Final. Gibson-Park was selected in Leinster's defeat to La Rochelle in the 2023 European Rugby Champions Cup final.

In April 2025, he was nominated for Champions Cup Player of the Year 2025.

== International career ==
=== Māori All Blacks ===
Although the then 20-year-old Gibson-Park had only played eleven matches for Taranaki, Jamie Joseph, the Māori All Blacks coach, selected him for the 2012 end of year tour to England, playing against domestic club team Leicester Tigers, an invitational RFU Championship XV, and ending against the Canadian national team.

=== Ireland ===
In August 2019, Gibson-Park became eligible to play for Ireland under the World Rugby's eligibility rules. In October 2020, he was named in the Ireland squad by coach Andy Farrell for the remaining matches of the 2020 Six Nations Championship. Gibson Park came off the bench against Italy for his first cap on 24 October 2020.

In November 2021, he was selected as the starting scrum-half for Ireland's test against Japan, scoring his first international try in a 60–5 victory. He kept his place for the visit of New Zealand a week later and played a key role in a 29–20 win over his native country. His performance against New Zealand earned him praise for his speed of service and work-rate in defence. He scored a try in Ireland's 30–24 loss against France in the 2022 Six Nations, and then another against Italy two weeks later in a 57–6 win.

In November 2024, he was named in the 2024 World Rugby Dream Team of the Year.

In January 2025, he scored a try and was named man of the match in the opening round of the 2025 Six Nations as Ireland defeated England 27–22.

=== British & Irish Lions ===
In May 2025, he was selected for the 2025 British & Irish Lions tour to Australia.

== Personal life ==
Gibson-Park is a New Zealander of Māori descent (Ngāti Porou and Ngā Tai descent).

On 18 December 2023, the Irish Department of Justice announced that Jamison Gibson-Park had become a citizen of Ireland.

Gibson-Park lives in Dublin and is married to Patti Grogan since 2022, they have three children, a son and two daughters.

== Career statistics ==
=== List of international tries ===
No.	Position	Points	Tries	Result	Opposition	Venue	Date	Ref.
1	Scrum-half	5	1	Won	Japan	Aviva Stadium	6 November 2021	
2	Scrum-half	5	1	Lost	France	Stade de France	12 February 2022	
3	Scrum-half	5	1	Won	Italy	Aviva Stadium	27 February 2022	
4	Scrum-half	5	1	Won	Romania	Nouveau Stade de Bordeaux	9 September 2023	
5	Scrum-half	5	1	Lost	New Zealand	Stade de France	14 October 2023	
6	Scrum-half	5	1	Won	France	Stade Vélodrome	2 February 2024	
7	Scrum-half	5	1	Won	England	Aviva Stadium	1 February 2025	
8	Scrum-half	5	1	Won	England	Allianz Stadium	21 February 2026	

As of 22 February 2026
