= Andy Rich =

- Full name: Andrew Malcolm Rich
- Born: 25 July 1968 (age 58)

Rugby union career
- Position: Lock
Provincial / State sides
Years	Team	Apps	(Points)
1987	Canterbury	3	(0)
1989–95	Otago	63	(24)
Super Rugby
Years	Team	Apps	(Points)
1996	Highlanders	5	(0)

Andrew Malcolm Rich (born 25 July 1968) is a New Zealand former professional rugby union player.

An Otago lock, Rich made 63 appearances for his province and was a foundation player for the Highlanders in the inaugural Super 12 season in 1996. He participated in wins over the British Lions and Springboks with Otago.

Rich is the husband of former member of parliament Katherine Rich.
