= Justin Cullen =

Rugby player (born 1970)

- Full name: Justin Alexander Cullen
- Born: 29 April 1970 (age 56)
- Height: 196 cm (6 ft 5 in)
- Weight: 109 kg (240 lb)

Rugby union career
- Position: Lock
Provincial / State sides
Years	Team	Apps	(Points)
1993–97	Otago	57	(20)
1999	Southland	12	(0)
2000	Poverty Bay	1	(0)
Super Rugby
Years	Team	Apps	(Points)
1996	Highlanders	9	(0)

Justin Alexander Cullen (born 29 April 1970) is a New Zealand former professional rugby union player.

A mobile lock, Cullen competed for Otago from 1993 to 1997, during which time he was a New Zealand Universities representative player. He was a member of the Highlanders for the inaugural Super 12 season in 1996.

Cullen played with English club Bedford in the 1997–98 season, then joined Connacht in 1998, taking advantage of being an Irish passport holder, courtesy of his mother. His time in Ireland was brief and he finished his career back in New Zealand, playing at Southland in 1999 and Poverty Bay in 2000.
