= John Blaikie =

- Born: John Blaikie; 28 December 1973 (age 52) Hamilton, New Zealand
- Height: 1.98 m (6 ft 6 in)
- Weight: 110 kg (17 st 5 lb)
- School: Otago Boys
- University: Otago University; Cambridge University
- Notable relative: Duncan Blaikie (brother)

Rugby union career
- Position: Lock
Senior career
Years	Team	Apps	(Points)
2002–2005	Grenoble		
Provincial / State sides
Years	Team	Apps	(Points)
1995–2001	Otago	76	(10)
Super Rugby
Years	Team	Apps	(Points)
1997–2002	Highlanders	53	(0)
International career
Years	Team	Apps	(Points)
1999	New Zealand A	1	(0)

John Blaikie (born 28 December 1973 in Hamilton, New Zealand) is a retired rugby union footballer.

== Playing career ==
A hard-working, reliable lock, Blaikie attended Otago Boys' High School and quickly moved into the Otago provincial side. He made his debut for the Highlanders in 1997, and was a regular starter by 1998.

Through the Highlanders most successful period from 1998 to 2002, Blaikie was a fixture in the line-up, and was a member of the team that reached the 1999 Super 12 Final. In 1999 and 2000, he was a teammate of his brother Duncan, who was a loose forward for the squad.

Although he was selected to New Zealand A squads, he was never selected to the All Blacks.

In 2002, Blaikie moved to FC Grenoble in France, where he spent three seasons before retiring from professional rugby. Following his retirement, he attended Cambridge University and played for the varsity squad.

== Honours ==
- National Provincial Championship
  - Champions (1) : 1998 (Otago)
- Super 12
  - Runners-up (1) : 1999 (Highlanders)
