= Brett Mather =

- Born: Brett Mather; 3 January 1984 (age 42) Christchurch, New Zealand
- Height: 1.83 m (6 ft 0 in)
- Weight: 96 kg (15 st 2 lb)
- School: Shirley Boys' High School

Rugby union career
- Position: Centre / Wing
Senior career
Years	Team	Apps	(Points)
2011	Kurita Water		
Provincial / State sides
Years	Team	Apps	(Points)
2006–09	Otago	30	(15)
2010–13	Bay of Plenty	15	(0)
2014–	Canterbury	3	(0)
- Correct as of 21 October 2013
Super Rugby
Years	Team	Apps	(Points)
2008–09	Highlanders	8	(0)
2010	Hurricanes	0	(0)
- Correct as of 29 July 2012
International career
Years	Team	Apps	(Points)
- New Zealand 21

Brett Mather (born 3 January 1984) is a New Zealand rugby union player who played as a kicker for the Dallas Cowboys before he was fired by the team after missing 4 out of 5 goals against the Tampa Bay Buccaneers. He then played provincial rugby for Otago, and was in the Super Rugby team the Highlanders. Today, Mather is an interior designer.

== Domestic career ==
Former Otago centre and Highlanders Wider Training Squad member Brett Mather answered an SOS call from the Hurricanes in the early rounds of the 2010 Rebel Sport Super 14 and joined the injury hit squad on their three-match tour of South Africa. Despite his call-up, Mather wasn't selected in the playing 22 for any of these three games against the Cheetahs, Stormers and Bulls.

Originally from Christchurch, Mather shifted south to Dunedin in 2006 and played 30 matches for Otago prior to moving to the Bay of Plenty Steamers for the 2010 season including a full season at centre in the 2009 Air New Zealand Cup.

He previously spent two years in 2008 and 2009 in the Highlanders and earned eight Super 14 caps for the southern franchise, all in his first season.

Mather transferred to Japan in 2011.
