= Marius Mostert =

South African rugby union player

- Born: 23 October 1969 (age 57)

Rugby union career
- Position: Prop
Super Rugby
Years	Team	Apps	(Points)
2000–01	Cats	?	(?)
2002	Highlanders	1	(0)

Marius Mostert (born 23 October 1969) is a South African former professional rugby union player.

Mostert was educated at Eben Dönges High School in Kraaifontein near Cape Town. He played in the Super 12 for the Cats, forming a front-row with Leon Boshoff and Willie Meyer. His contract wasn't renewed in 2001 and he moved to Port Elizabeth to play Currie Cup rugby for Eastern Province, but was requested to return after Cats prop Heinrich Kok was sidelined by injury. He got loaned out by Eastern Province for the season.

Relocating to New Zealand, Mostert joined Otago during the 2001 season and was signed by the Highlanders for their 2002 campaign, linking up with ex-Cats coach Laurie Mains. He made one Highlanders appearance, coming on off the bench against the Crusaders in the opening round of the 2002 Super 12 season.
