= Duncan Blaikie =

- Full name: Duncan James Oke Blaikie
- Born: 2 October 1975 (age 51) Hamilton, New Zealand
- School: Otago Boys' High School
- University: University of Otago; University of Cambridge
- Notable relative: John Blaikie (brother)
- Occupation: Solicitor

Rugby union career
- Position: Loose forward
Provincial / State sides
Years	Team	Apps	(Points)
1995–01	Otago	30	(15)
Super Rugby
Years	Team	Apps	(Points)
1999–00	Highlanders	3	(0)
2001	Chiefs	8	(0)

Duncan James Oke Blaikie (born 2 October 1975) is a New Zealand former professional rugby union player.

== Biography ==
Born in Hamilton, Blaikie is a son of judge Oke Blaikie and younger brother of Highlanders lock John Blaikie. He attended Otago Boys' High School and studied medicine at the University of Otago, before switching to law at the University of Cambridge, where he had gone to study for a MPhil degree.

Blaikie, an Otago loose forward, had three seasons competing in the Super 12, two with the Highlanders and one with the Chiefs. He captained Cambridge University to victory in the 2002 Varsity match, forming a back row with countrymen Stewart Eru and Owen Scrimgeour. The opposing captain, Oxford's Fraser Gemmell, was also from New Zealand.
