= Nick White (rugby union) =

New Zealand rugby union player (born 1974)

- Born: 1 May 1974 (age 52)
- Height: 180 cm (5 ft 11 in)
- Weight: 114 kg (251 lb)
- School: Kings College

Rugby union career
- Position: Prop
Provincial / State sides
Years	Team	Apps	(Points)
1996-1999	Northland	36	
2000-2008	Auckland	84	
Super Rugby
Years	Team	Apps	(Points)
1999-2001	Blues	31	
2002	Crusaders	1	
2003	Blues		
2004 & 2006	Highlanders		
2007-2009	Blues		
Coaching career
- Years: Team
- 2016-2017: Auckland

Nick White (born 1 May 1974) is a retired New Zealand rugby union player. White won several NPC trophies with Auckland and Super Rugby titles with the Crusaders and the Blues. He played as a Prop.

== Biography ==
White also played XI cricket for Kings College as a useful left-arm medium pacer. During his career White was also known for his goal kicking, not a skill often attributed to props.

== Career ==
=== Provincial ===
White made his debut for Northland in 1996. Wanting to play for a larger union White requested a transfer away from Northland, with Auckland being the final destination. This move proved personally beneficial for White who won NPC titles in 2002, 2003, 2005 and 2007.

=== Super Rugby ===
White made his Super Rugby debut for the Blues in 1999 (vs. Brumbies) playing a total of 31 games for the region.

White played one game for the Crusaders debuting on 12 March 2002 (vs. Stormers) alongside teammate Johnny Leo'o. Despite only playing a single game, White was part of the legendary 2002 Crusaders team which played the entire season unbeaten. White returned to the Blues following his only season at the Crusaders. In his return to the Blues, they won the 2003 title and despite not playing in either final over the past two years he was part of back-to-back winning teams.

Following a year without playing Super Rugby in 2005, White returned in 2006 this time with the Highlanders.

White was forced to retire in 2009 due to requiring a hip replacement.

=== Representative teams ===
White played for New Zealand A in 2000.

== Coaching ==
Following his retirement from playing White took up various coaching roles with the Blues including coaching the development team and scrum coach for the first team. He was made an assistant coach for Auckland in 2012. In 2016 White was announced the head coach for Auckland in the Mitre 10 Cup. Following the end of the 2017 season White left the position. White is currently the scrum coach for the Chiefs.
