= Kara Pryor =

New Zealand rugby union player

- Born: 2 April 1991 (age 35) New Zealand
- Height: 1.89 m (6 ft 2 in)
- Weight: 105 kg (16 st 7 lb; 231 lb)
- Notable relative: Dan Pryor (brother)

Rugby union career
- Position: Loose forward
- Current team: Seattle Seawolves
Senior career
| Years | Team | Apps | (Points) |
| 2021–2023 | Rugby New York | 41 | (35) |
| 2024– | Seattle Seawolves | 2 | (5) |
- Correct as of 4 August 2024
Provincial / State sides
| Years | Team | Apps | (Points) |
| 2012–2013 | Auckland | 5 | (5) |
| 2014–2021 | Northland | 62 | (40) |
- Correct as of 9 May 2022
Super Rugby
| Years | Team | Apps | (Points) |
| 2016–2018 | Blues | 23 | (15) |
| 2019 | Sunwolves | 3 | (0) |
- Correct as of 9 May 2022
International career
| Years | Team | Apps | (Points) |
| 2016–2017 | Māori All Blacks | 2 | (0) |
- Correct as of 4 August 2024

Kara A. Pryor (born 2 April 1991) is a New Zealand rugby union player who currently plays as a loose forward.

== Senior career ==
Pryor started out his National Provincial Championship career with Auckland and played 5 times for them before heading north to play alongside older brother Dan with the Northland Taniwha. He debuted for the Taniwha at the start of the 2014 season and instantly became an important member of their side, forming a strong loose forward combination along with his brother as well as Tongan international Jack Ram.

Pryor's first season with Northland was a successful one for the Taniwha who are traditionally known as one of New Zealand's weaker provinces. They finished 3rd on the Championship table with Pryor appearing in all 11 of their games during the season and contributing 1 try. Just over half of his appearances in 2014 were from the start, but by 2015, he was firmly established as one of the first names on the teamsheet, playing 10 times, 9 times from the start and once from the bench in what was a tough season for Northland which saw them finish bottom of the Championship with no wins. 2016 saw a rise in performances for the Taniwha but with little to show for it in terms of results, only 1 win in 10 games again confined them to the Championship wooden spoon, Pryor however, was in fine form. Held back by injury in the early part of the year, he still managed 7 appearances, all from the start and 1 try.

== Super Rugby ==
Fine form domestically for Auckland and later Northland brought Pryor to the attention of local Super Rugby franchise, the Blues. He played for their development side in 2014 and 2015 and also provided injury cover during the 2015 season. He was named as part of their senior squad for the first time ahead of the 2016 Super Rugby season. On a personal note, his first season of Super Rugby went well as he featured in 13 of the Blues 15 games and scored 2 tries. The majority of his appearances in his first season came from the replacements bench as he faced stiff competition from the other Blues loose forwards such as All Blacks; Jerome Kaino and Steve Luatua.

== International ==
In October 2016 Pryor, who affiliates to the Ngāti Awa, Ngāti Pikiao, and Ngāti Rangitihi iwi, was named in the Māori All Blacks squad for their end of year tour to the Northern Hemisphere. He debuted in the number 7 jersey in their 54-7 victory over the United States on 4 November 2016.
