= Luke Katene =

- Born: Joseph Luke Katene; 4 June 1986 (age 40) Helensville, New Zealand
- Height: 1.99 m (6 ft 6 1/2 in)
- Weight: 112 kg (247 lb)
- School: Church College
- University: University of Canterbury
- Occupations: Accountant; schoolteacher

Rugby union career
- Position: Lock
Provincial / State sides
Years	Team	Apps	(Points)
2010	Bay of Plenty	4	(0)
2011–2013	Canterbury	22	(10)
2014	Waikato	7	(0)
International career
Years	Team	Apps	(Points)
2013	Māori All Blacks	1	(5)

Joseph Luke Katene (born 4 June 1986) is a former New Zealand rugby union player. He played in the lock position for provincial side Canterbury and for New Zealand's Māori international side the Māori All Blacks. Katene has previously played for Bay of Plenty in 2010 before heading to Canterbury ahead of 2011 season's ITM Cup.
