= Keith Cameron (rugby union) =

New Zealand rugby union player

- Born: 3 February 1978 (age 48) Whakatāne, New Zealand
- Height: 1.89 m (6 ft 2 in)
- Weight: 110 kg (17 st 5 lb)

Rugby union career
- Position: Prop
Provincial / State sides
Years	Team	Apps	(Points)
	Otago	24	(0)
-	Southland	36	(15)
- Correct as of 19 January 2008
Super Rugby
Years	Team	Apps	(Points)
2007–	Highlanders	3	
- Correct as of 19 January 2008
International career
Years	Team	Apps	(Points)
2007	New Zealand Māori	2	(0)
- Correct as of 19 January 2008

Keith Cameron (born 3 February 1978 in Whakatāne) is a New Zealand rugby union player who currently plays as a prop for Otago in the Air New Zealand Cup.

Cameron made his provincial debut for Otago in the NPC in 1999. He transferred to Southland for the 2001 season, but later returned to Otago. He was selected in the Highlanders squad for the 2007 Super 14 season and made his Super Rugby debut against the Lions on 10 February 2007. He was also selected for the New Zealand Māori squad (representing Te Whānau-ā-Apanui iwi) for the 2007 Churchill Cup and played two games, starting against Canada and coming on as a reserve in the final against England Saxons.

For the 2009 Super 14 season, Cameron is part of the Highlanders' wider training group, although not the main squad.
