= Chris Eves =

NZ rugby union player (born 1987)

- Full name: Christopher I. Eves
- Born: 11 December 1987 (age 38) Henderson, New Zealand
- Height: 1.87 m (6 ft 2 in)
- Weight: 118 kg (18 st 8 lb; 260 lb)
- School: Massey High School

Rugby union career
- Position: Prop
- Current team: Bay of Plenty / Sunwolves
Senior career
Years	Team	Apps	(Points)
2008	North Harbour	2	(5)
2010–2011	Agronomia	-	(-)
2013–2016	Manawatu	30	(20)
2014–2019	Hurricanes	85	(10)
2017–2019	North Harbour	9	(0)
2019-	Bay of Plenty	4	(0)
2020-	Sunwolves	2	(0)
- Correct as of 19 February 2020
International career
Years	Team	Apps	(Points)
2013−	Māori All Blacks	7	(5)
- Correct as of 23 January 2017

Chris Eves (born 11 December 1987) is a New Zealand rugby union player who currently plays as a prop for the Bay of Plenty Steamers in New Zealand's domestic Mitre 10 Cup and the Sunwolves in the international Super Rugby competition.

== Early career ==
Born in Henderson, in the suburbs of Auckland, New Zealand, Eves was educated at Massey High School where he played first XV rugby for 3 years. During his high school years, he was part of school touring groups to Europe, Australia and South Africa as well as working his way through the youth structures of his local province, North Harbour.

== Senior career ==
Eves first played provincial rugby with his home province, North Harbour, during the 2008 Air New Zealand Cup. He made 2 appearances and scored 1 try but failed to build on his early breakthrough and soon found himself in the rugby wilderness without a contract with one of New Zealand's senior provinces. Next, his career took a rather untrodden path to Portugal where he would spend 2 seasons playing for Agronomia. He was on the verge of making Portugal's national squad, however, their failure to qualify for the 2011 Rugby World Cup made him rethink his options.

Eves returned to New Zealand in 2012 and began playing for Wests Roosters in Wellington's local club rugby competition. Local province, the Wellington Lions offered him a contract ahead of the 2013 ITM Cup, however, with his chances of getting regular game time slim, he opted to head north to Palmerston North and join the Manawatu Turbos on loan.

Eves immediately made a big impression with the Turbos, playing 10 times for them in what was a disappointing 2013 season which saw them finish 5th in the Championship. 2014 was much more positive, with the men from Palmerston North earning promotion to the Premiership for 2015 after a 32–24 win over Hawke's Bay in the final with Eves, now on a permanent contract with the Turbos, once more playing 10 times during the year.

Eves missed the Turbos entire Premiership campaign in 2015 with a hamstring injury sustained playing in the Super Rugby final with the Hurricanes, and they were once again a Championship side when he made his return in 2016. He featured in all 10 of their regular season games, starting 5 times and scoring 2 tries as they ended up in 5th place on the Championship log, just outside of the promotion playoff places.

Eves signed with North Harbour for the 2017 Mitre 10 Cup Season.

Eves signed with Bay of Plenty Steamers for the 2019 Mitre 10 Cup Season. Here, he helped them gain a promotion into the Mitre 10 Cup Premiership for the 2020 season

== Super Rugby ==
Good performances in Wellington club rugby for Wests Roosters saw Eves involved with the Hurricanes Development side in 2013 and he was subsequently promoted to their wider training squad for 2014. Due to a series of injuries in the franchise's front row, he was able to make 11 substitute appearances throughout the campaign and then continued his ascendancy by being named in the 'Canes senior squad for the first time in 2015.

The Hurricanes were losing finalists in 2015, being beaten 21–14 at home by New Zealand rivals, the Highlanders in the final. Eves was in fine form, featuring in 17 of their 18 games during the season, with all but 2 of these appearances coming from the replacements bench. The men from Wellington went one better in 2016, defeating the Lions 20–3 in the final to be crowned Super Rugby champions. Eves once again played 17 times and this time amassed 4 starting appearances.

After Eves' contract with the Hurricanes ended in 2019 he was signed by Major League Rugby side San Diego Legion before promptly singing with Super Rugby side the Sunwolves for the 2020 Super Rugby season.

== International ==
Following on from a solid domestic season with Manawatu in 2013, Eves was named in the Māori All Blacks squad ahead of their 2013 tour of North America. He debuted for the Māori in their 40–15 rout of Canada in Toronto, coming on as a 66th minute replacement for Kane Hames. One week later he earned a second cap in the 29–19 win over the United States where he was once again a second-half replacement for Hames.

One year later and Eves was once again in the Māori squad for their 2 test series with Japan. He earned a first start and scored his first try for the Māori in their 61–21 win in Kobe in the first test before once again starting in the much tighter second test in Tokyo a week later where he was substituted by Hurricanes teammate Brendon Edmonds in the 58th minute of a 20–18 victory.

Eves didn't play for the Māori in 2015 and had to wait almost 2 years between gaining is 4th and 5th caps. He featured as a second-half replacement for Kane Hames in all 3 matches during the 2016 end-of-year rugby union internationals, victories over the US and Harlequins and a defeat to Munster.

== Personal life ==
Eves is a New Zealander of Māori descent (Tainui descent).

== Career honours ==
Hurricanes

- Super Rugby – 2016

Manawatu

- ITM Cup Championship – 2014

== Super Rugby statistics ==
As of 24 January 2017

Season	Team	Games	Starts	Sub	Mins	Tries	Cons	Pens	Drops	Points	Yel	Red
2014	Hurricanes	11	0	11	125	0	0	0	0	0	0	0
2015	Hurricanes	17	2	15	419	1	0	0	0	5	0	0
2016	Hurricanes	17	4	13	576	0	0	0	0	0	0	0
Total		45	6	39	1120	1	0	0	0	5	0	0
