= Joe Royal (rugby union) =

Joseph Royal image =
- Born: Joseph Wirihana Royal; 31 May 1985 (age 41) Rotorua, Bay of Plenty, New Zealand
- Height: 1.83 m (6 ft 0 in)
- Weight: 113 kg (249 lb)
- School: Te Aute College
- University: Auckland University of Technology

Rugby union career
- Position(s): Hooker, Prop
Provincial / State sides
Years	Team	Apps	(Points)
2013–2016	Bay of Plenty	36	(40)
2017–2019, 2021	Counties Manukau	33	(35)
2020-2023	Auckland	5	(5)
2022-2024	Ngāti Porou East Coast	22	(35)
- Correct as of 22 November 2022
Super Rugby
Years	Team	Apps	(Points)
2022-2023	Moana Pasifika	2	(0)
- Correct as of 22 November 2022
International career
Years	Team	Apps	(Points)
2013–2016	Māori All Blacks	6	(5)
- Correct as of 18 July 2017

Joseph Wirihana Royal (born 31 May 1985 in Rotorua, New Zealand) is a New Zealand rugby union player. He plays in the hooker (and occasionally prop) position for provincial side Auckland Gulls and for New Zealand's Māori international side the Māori All Blacks. Royal has previously played club rugby in Auckland before heading to Bay of Plenty Rugby in 2013 and spending 4 seasons with the Bay Steamers. After moving back home to Auckland in 2017 as an injury replacement for the Blues, has played 4 seasons with the Counties Manukau Steelers and is now with both Auckland Rugby in the Bunnings NPC and loaned to Ngāti Porou East Coast in the Heartland Championship.

== Personal life ==
Royal is a New Zealander of Māori descent (Te Arawa, Ngāti Whātua o Ōrākei and Ngāpuhi descent).
