= Kane Hames =

New Zealand rugby player (born 1988)

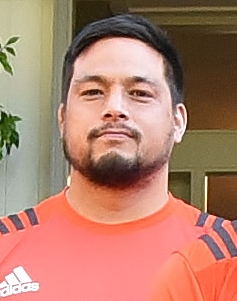
- Hames in 2017
- Full name: Kane Seth Hames
- Born: 28 August 1988 (age 38) Wellington, New Zealand
- Height: 180 cm (5 ft 11 in)
- Weight: 113 kg (249 lb; 17 st 11 lb)
- School: Trident High School

Rugby union career
- Position: Prop
Senior career
Years	Team	Apps	(Points)
2013–2014	Bay of Plenty	13	(5)
2014–2015	Highlanders	20	(5)
2015–2017	Tasman	16	(0)
2016–2017	Chiefs	25	(10)
- Correct as of 3 August 2019
International career
Years	Team	Apps	(Points)
2013–2017	Māori All Blacks	4	(5)
2016–2017	New Zealand	10	(0)
- Correct as of 28 April 2019

Kane Seth Hames (born 28 August 1988) is a former New Zealand rugby union player. A prop, he played for the Chiefs and Highlanders in Super Rugby, and represented Tasman from 2015 to 2017 and Bay of Plenty from 2013 to 2014. He played ten matches for the All Blacks in 2016 and 2017. Due to on-going symptoms from concussion Hames stopped playing rugby after 2017 and was forced to retire. He subsequently took up refereeing and television commentary, as well as some set-piece coaching work, but stated that even six years after retirement he still suffered some concussion symptoms.

== Career ==
=== Domestic ===
In Super Rugby, Hames played two seasons for the Highlanders in 2014 and 2015, before moving to the Chiefs for the 2016 competition. Hames became a regular for the Chiefs and played almost every game for them in 2017. He played a total of 45 Super Rugby games. He also represented the Bay of Plenty Rugby Union and Tasman Rugby Union at provincial level, playing a total of 29 games between the two unions. Due to concussion symptoms, he has not played rugby since 2017.

=== International ===
Affiliating to Ngāi Tūhoe and Ngāti Porou, Hames made his first appearance for the Māori All Blacks in 2013. Hames started for the Maori All Blacks against the British and Irish Lions in 2017, playing well until he was subbed off in the 62nd minute for Hurricanes prop Chris Eves.

He made his debut for the New Zealand national side, the All Blacks, in 2016, coming off the bench in the first test against Australia. Hames was not selected for the All Blacks again until the 2017 Rugby Championship where he was called up as injury replacement for a concussed Wyatt Crockett. Hames came off the bench in the 35–29 win against Australia in the second Bledisloe Cup test for the year, replacing Joe Moody. Moody was injured in the first test against Argentina for the year, so Hames started in the first test against South Africa, which was a record 57–0 win, South Africa's worst defeat in history.

Hames was subbed off in the 38th minute of the third Bledisloe Cup test against Australia after taking a serious head knock, being replaced by Crockett. The test ended in a 23–18 loss. Hames made a quick recovery from injury to start against the Barbarians at Twickenham and started in all three tests on the end-of-year tour, ending the 2017 season with what was arguably his best performance of his career against Scotland in the 22–17 win, as well as a 60-minute performance against Wales in the 33–18 win.

== Concussion and retirement from playing ==
Hames did not return to playing following his last match for the All Blacks, against Wales in November 2017, due to on-going symptoms from concussion, which affected him most significantly in the year after he stopped playing. He took up refereeing and also television commentary work. In 2023 Hames stated that he was still suffering from symptoms six years after his last concussion, and that this had delayed his transition into coaching, but he had worked as a set-piece coach for the Queensland Reds under head coach Brad Thorn for a season starting in August 2022.
