= Elliot Dixon =

NZ rugby union player (born 1989)

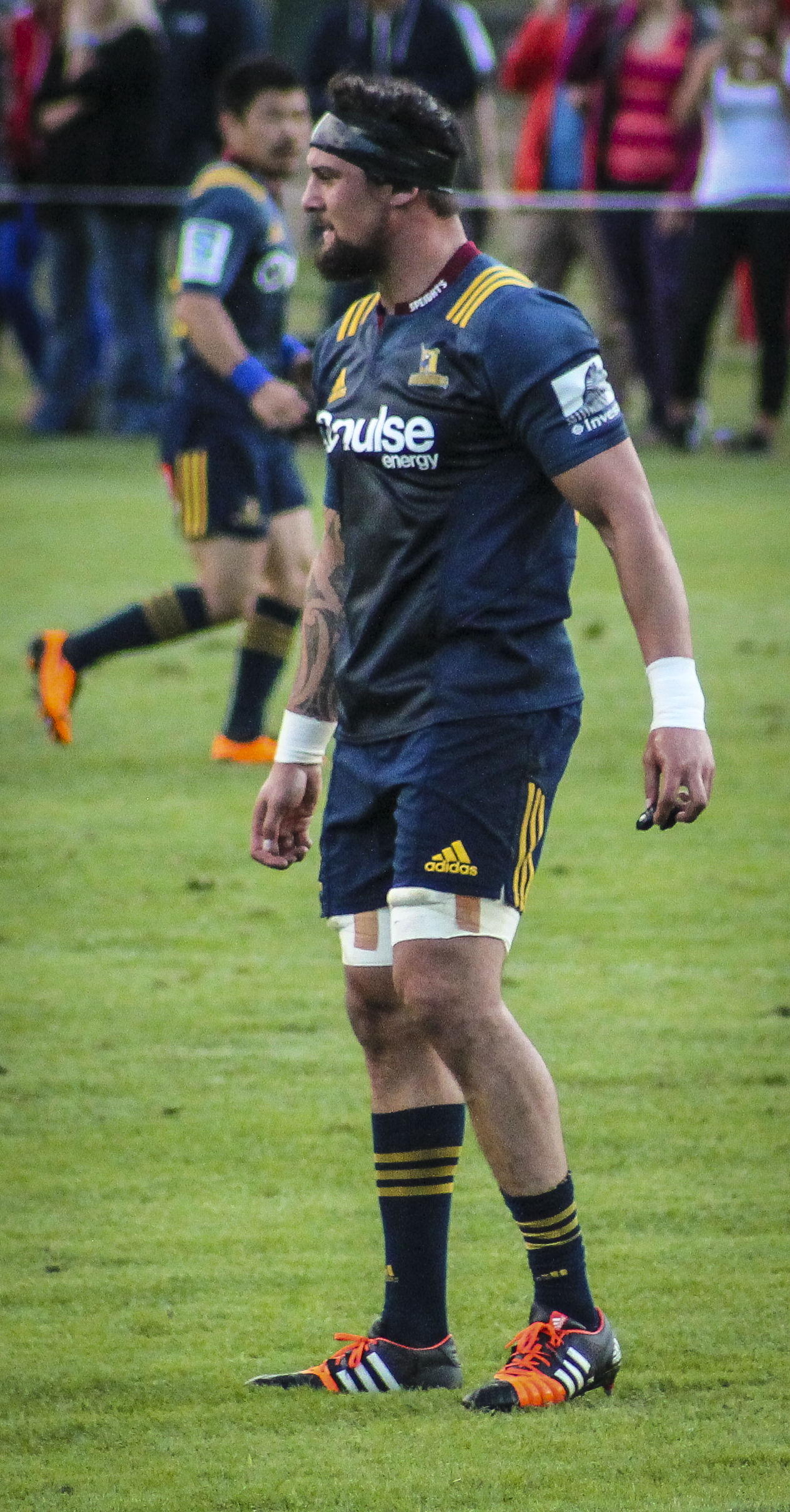
- Dixon representing the Highlanders in Queenstown, February 2016
- Full name: Elliot Christopher Dixon
- Born: 4 September 1989 (age 37) Christchurch, New Zealand
- Height: 194 cm (6 ft 4 in)
- Weight: 109 kg (240 lb; 17 st 2 lb)
- School: St. Bede's College
- Occupation: Rugby player

Rugby union career
- Position(s): Flanker, Number 8, Lock
- Current team: Biarritz
Senior career
Years	Team	Apps	(Points)
2010–2017	Southland	65	(65)
2012–2019	Highlanders	105	(92)
2018–2021	Ricoh Black Rams	23	(15)
2021–2023	Biarritz	40	(20)
- Correct as of 21 August 2021
International career
Years	Team	Apps	(Points)
2009	New Zealand U20	5	(5)
2012–2017	Māori All Blacks	11	(10)
2017	New Zealand	3	(5)
- Correct as of 21 August 2021

Elliot Christopher Dixon (born 4 September 1989) is a professional rugby union player. He represents the Highlanders in the Super Rugby competition and Southland in the ITM Cup, playing at number 8. Dixon is best known for his three test appearances for the All Blacks in 2016.

== Early life ==
Dixon is of Māori (Ngāpuhi) and Scottish Ancestry on his father's side and Irish on his mother's side. He grew up in Christchurch and attended St Bede's College.

== Playing career ==
=== Provincial rugby ===
Dixon moved through the age group levels for Canterbury, but transferred to Southland in late 2009 for a better chance to play in the provincial competition.

He made his provincial debut for Southland during the 2010 ITM Cup, scoring a try on his first appearance in a 37–23 win over Manawatu. He developed into a key member of the team over the course of the season, sharing playing time at number 8 with veteran Samoan international Kane Thompson. In the 2011 ITM Cup, Dixon appeared in every match for Southland, and helped the team to a Ranfurly Shield victory over Canterbury on 23 July.

=== Super Rugby ===
Following his solid season for Southland in 2010, Dixon was included in the Highlanders squad for the 2011 Super Rugby season. It would be a difficult season, however, as he didn't make any appearances for the squad due in large part to an elbow injury which left him unavailable for most of the year.

Dixon took over as captain of the Highlanders for many games of the 2017 season due to the loss of co-captains Ash Dixon and Ben Smith to injury. Dixon had already been required to step up due to the large number of other loose forwards that were injured. Dixon missed the Highlanders' famous 23-22 narrow victory over the touring British and Irish Lions that season due to his inclusion in the Māori All Blacks, with future All Black captain Luke Whitelock leading the team, and Gareth Evans starting at flanker in Dixon's place. Dixon lost his place in the starting XV to Whitelock by the end of the season.

=== International play ===
Dixon was a key member of the squad that won the Under-20 World Cup in 2009, where he suited up alongside current Southland teammates Robbie Robinson, Brayden Mitchell, and Alex Ryan. The longest drop-goal attempt was attempted by Dixon in the final but landed 50 metres short.

On 29 May 2016 he was selected as one of three un-capped loose forwards, alongside Highlanders teammate Liam Squire and Hurricanes flanker Ardie Savea, in the All Blacks' 32-man squad for a three-test series against Wales. Dixon made his debut for New Zealand at blindside flanker on 25 June 2016 in the third test of the Welsh series, being selected to start over then-69-test veteran Jerome Kaino. Dixon performed well and was replaced by Squire, who was also on debut, in the 55th minute, with the All Blacks winning the test 46-6 and ending the series as a 3-0 clean sweep.

Dixon was retained for the All Blacks' 33-man squad for the 2016 Rugby Championship. The All Blacks won the competition but it was a personal disappointment for Dixon, who only managed four minutes of game time in the competition, mostly due to the dominance of Savea and Squire as replacements off the bench. Those four minutes came on 1 October 2016 when he replaced All Blacks captain Kieran Read 76 minutes into the All Blacks' 36–17 over Argentina. Dixon made one more appearance for New Zealand in 2016, playing the full 80 minutes against Italy on 12 November. Dixon scored his first international try against Italy, scoring in the 62nd minute while also setting up Steven Luatua for his try.

Dixon was not selected for the All Blacks for the Pasifika Challenge against Samoa and three-test 2017 British and Irish Lions series. Dixon's omission from the squad was due to the inclusion of Hurricanes flanker Vaea Fifita. Dixon was also named in the Māori All Blacks' squad to face the Lions on the same day. Dixon started at openside flanker for the Māori All Blacks against the Lions on 17 June and was replaced by Kara Pryor in the 72nd minute of their 10–32 loss to the Lions.
