= Blade Thomson =

Scotland international rugby union player (born 1990)

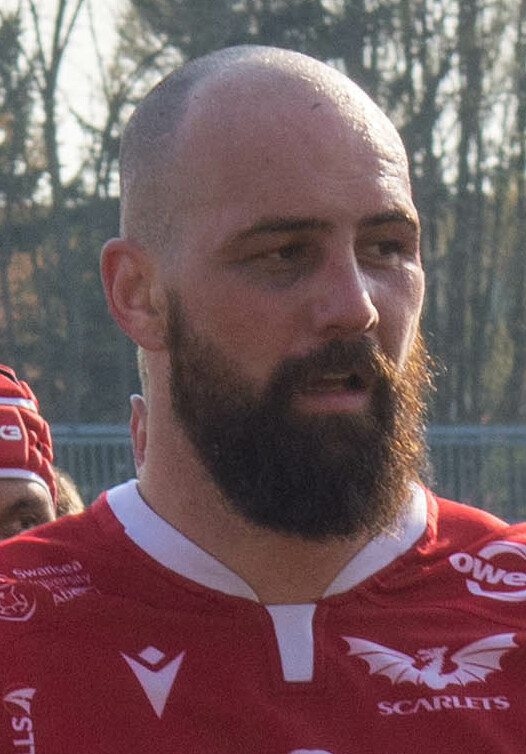
- Full name: Blade Neville Thomson
- Born: 4 December 1990 (age 35) Auckland, New Zealand
- Height: 1.98 m (6 ft 6 in)
- Weight: 106 kg (16 st 10 lb; 234 lb)
- School: Gisborne Boys' High School

Rugby union career
- Position(s): Number 8 Blindside Flanker; Lock
Senior career
Years	Team	Apps	(Points)
2010–2017	Taranaki	47	(60)
2013–2018	Hurricanes	45	(50)
2018–2023	Scarlets	54	(15)
- Correct as of 16 February 2023
International career
Years	Team	Apps	(Points)
2010	New Zealand U20	5	(15)
2013–2015	Maori All Blacks	6	(0)
2019–2021	Scotland	10	(0)

Blade Neville Thomson (born 4 December 1990) is a former professional rugby union player who played as a lock or loose forward. Born in Auckland, New Zealand, he represented Scotland in international rugby, being eligible for the national team through his paternal grandfather, Robert, who was from Wishaw. He played for Taranaki in the ITM Cup and for the Super Rugby franchise the Hurricanes, and spent the last five years of his career playing in Wales for the Scarlets.

== Professional career ==
Thomson was a member of the Hurricanes Wider Training Group in 2012, and he joined the squad for the 2013 Super Rugby season. Thomson missed the 2017 Super Rugby season due to shoulder reconstruction surgery.

Thomson joined Pro14 team the Scarlets at the beginning of the 2018–19 season.

On 16 February 2023, Thomson announced his retirement due to a head injury.

== International career ==
Thomson was a member of the New Zealand Under 20 team that won the 2010 IRB Junior World Championship in Argentina, where the 197 cm forward played alongside the likes of Crusaders Tyler Bleyendaal and Tom Marshall and All Black winger Julian Savea.

In October 2018, Thomson was called up to Scotland for the Autumn Internationals. He made his Scotland debut on 24 August 2019 in a Rugby World Cup warm-up match against France at Murrayfield Stadium.

Thompson was part of the Scotland squad for the 2019 Rugby World Cup. He played in the 3 matches, as a substitute in the opening game against Ireland before starting against both Samoa and Japan.

== Personal life ==
Thomson is a New Zealander of Māori descent (Ngāpuhi descent).
