= Nick Barrett =

NZ Maori international rugby union player

Nicholas Barrett
- Born: Nicholas Barrett; 1 November 1988 (age 38) Dannevirke, Manawatū-Whanganui, New Zealand
- Height: 1.84 m (6 ft 1/2 in)
- Weight: 117 kg (18 st 6 lb)

Rugby union career
- Position: Prop
Provincial / State sides
| Years | Team | Apps | (Points) |
| 2010–13 | Southland | 36 | (0) |
| 2014– | Auckland | 6 | (0) |
- Correct as of 19 October 2014
Super Rugby
| Years | Team | Apps | (Points) |
| 2011–12 | Crusaders | 0 | (0) |
| 2014– | Chiefs | 1 | (0) |
- Correct as of 21 July 2014
International career
| Years | Team | Apps | (Points) |
| 2013– | Māori All Blacks | 3 | (5) |
- Correct as of 11 November 2014

Nicholas Barrett (born 1 November 1988) is a New Zealand rugby union footballer. He plays as a prop for the Crusaders in Super Rugby and Southland Stags in the ITM Cup.
