= Shane Christie =

New Zealand rugby union player (1985–2025)

- Born: 23 July 1985 Palmerston North, New Zealand
- Died: 27 August 2025 (aged 40) Nelson, New Zealand
- Height: 1.81 m (5 ft 11 in)
- Weight: 95 kg (14 st 13 lb; 209 lb)
- School: Upper Hutt College

Rugby union career
- Position: Flanker
Senior career
Years	Team	Apps	(Points)
2010–2016	Tasman	73	(55)
2013	Crusaders	1	(0)
2014–2016	Highlanders	29	(10)
International career
Years	Team	Apps	(Points)
2012–2013, 2016	Māori All Blacks	8	(5)

Shane Christie (23 July 1985 – 27 August 2025) was a New Zealand rugby union player and coach. Christie made appearances with Tasman, the Highlanders, and the Māori All Blacks. After repeated concussions ended his rugby career, he became an advocate for greater recognition of chronic traumatic encephalopathy (CTE). He died at the age of 40 and was posthumously confirmed as the second known case of CTE in New Zealand professional rugby.

== Early career ==
Born on 23 July 1985, in Palmerston North, Christie was of Māori (Ngāti Kurawhatia and Te Āti Haunui-a-Pāpārangi) descent. He was raised in Nelson, before moving to Wellington during his schooldays and attending school at Upper Hutt College. He returned to Nelson after leaving school and began working as a builder, a job he would have for six years before breaking into top-level domestic rugby. During this time, he played rugby for Nelson in Tasman's club rugby competition and also played Heartland Championship rugby with Buller in 2009.

== Senior career ==
Christie first played senior provincial rugby with the Tasman Mako during the 2010 ITM Cup and scored two tries in five games. The Nelson-based team finished 12th out of 14 teams in the final season before the competition was rejigged to feature two divisions of 7 teams. He played all 10 games the following year as the Mako finished last in the Championship.

2012 was a more positive year for Tasman and it saw them finish 3rd in the Championship before a 41–34 semi-final loss to Otago. Christie was again ever-present, starting in 10 of 11 matches and scoring one try. The Makos gained promotion to the Premiership in 2013, finishing with 8 wins out of 10 regular season games before defeating Southland and Hawke's Bay in the semi-finals and final with Christie captaining the side and contributing 3 tries in 11 matches.

Tasman's upward trajectory continued through 2014 as they reached the Premiership final, being defeated 36–32 by Taranaki. Christie played ten times and scored one try, earning a nomination for the ITM Cup Player of the Season. Across the 2015 and 2016 seasons he scored five tries in 21 games, with the Makos finishing as losing semi-finalists and runners-up respectively.

== Super Rugby ==
After several seasons of domestic rugby with Tasman, Christie earned his first Super Rugby contract at the age of 28, spending the 2013 Super Rugby season with seven-time champions, the Crusaders. The team's loose forward group included All Blacks Richie McCaw, Kieran Read and Matt Todd, and Christie made a single appearance in what became his only season in Christchurch.

He headed south to Dunedin to join the Highlanders for 2014 and quickly established himself, starting 14 times and scoring two tries as they reached the tournament quarter-finals before losing 31–27 to the Sharks in Durban. Christie missed most of the 2015 season through injury. It was an historic season for the franchise as they won their first Super Rugby title, beating the Hurricanes 21–14 in the final.

In 2016, Christie was named Highlanders co-captain alongside All Blacks fullback Ben Smith. He played 11 times through the season. The Highlanders were defeated in the second round of play-offs, losing 42–30 to the Lions in Johannesburg. Christie didn't play in the semi-final loss, having received multiple concussions throughout the season. At the team's end-of-season awards he was named the 2016 Community Champ.

Christie was named in the squad by new coach Tony Brown ahead of the 2017 season, but he never played another game. Ongoing concussion symptoms kept Christie from the field all year, and he finally announced his retirement in May 2018. He had played 29 matches for the franchise.

== International ==
Christie represented the All Blacks Sevens twice during the 2010–11 IRB Sevens World Series and has also turned out for the Māori All Blacks since 2012. He received his first call up for the Māori ahead of their UK tour in November 2012 and debuted in a 32–24 defeat to Leicester Tigers on 13 November 2012. He started the match and played the entire 80 minutes before earning a second cap four days later as a second-half replacement for Nick Crosswell in a 52–21 demolition of an RFU Championship XV while on 23 November he saw his first action against test match opposition in the shape of Canada who were overcome 32–19 in Oxford, England.

2013 saw him earn two more caps for the Māori in their North American tour victories over Canada and the United States, appearing as a second-half replacement for Luke Braid in the match against Canada in Toronto and playing the entire 80 minutes in the number 6 shirt against the US in Pennsylvania.

Christie was again called up by the Māori ahead of their 2014 tour of Japan but had to withdraw due to injury, so it was after a gap of 3 years before he next pulled on the Black jersey, playing in matches against the US, Munster and Harlequins and scoring his first international try in the 22nd minute of the 26–10 win over Harlequins at Twickenham Stoop.

== Coaching career ==
Following his retirement, Christie became an assistant coach for the Tasman team which won premierships in 2019 and 2020. He also coached the Tasman's women's team at the Farah Palmer Cup. For the 2021 and 2022 seasons he was the Highlanders' defence coach.

== Concussions ==
Christie played his last match in 2016 and missed the entire 2017 season, never fully recovering from head injuries. The Highlanders had reported a "mystery illness" at the time. He officially ended his rugby career in 2018, at the age of 32, due to the effects of more concussions than he could remember. The first had happened when he was a teenager, and at least ten were confirmed during his playing career. Those included three or four in the space of six weeks during Super Rugby 2016. By the end of his career he was unable to handle even "really light" contact in training.

Christie spoke about living with concussion symptoms, including headaches, memory lapses, problems with his vision and speech, and mood swings, throughout the rest of his life.

In response to concerns raised by Christie, New Zealand Rugby commissioned a report into his concussion care. It was written by judge Jeremy Doogue in 2019 and included at least seven recommendations for NZR. The report was not made public at the time, and medical confidentiality prevented Christie from speaking publicly about it. This frustrated Christie, who believed that the recommendations ought to have been treated separately to medical details. As part of his work to increase awareness of CTE and improve the way rugby managed injuries like his, he wanted to discuss the recommendations and NZR's progress towards meeting them. Instead, Christie secretly provided the report to NZME journalist David Fisher. After Christie's death in 2025, Fisher wrote about the report in the New Zealand Herald, including new comments from Christie and all seven recommendations from the report, with NZR's response to each of them.

Players like myself, Carl Hayman, Billy Guyton and many more have faced difficult questions: “Are we depressed? Are we just lazy? Are our problems just mental health issues?” Understanding the condition has been a complex and isolating journey.

The symptoms have affected our brains in such a way that we may become impulsive and obsessive around specific goals or topics of interest. From my limited understanding of CTE, both positive and negative emotions will be extremely affected by the degenerative disease, which unfortunately for Billy meant his emotions and lack of understanding of the cause, became deadly.

Rugby, our beloved national sport, has provided careers and shaped the lives of many. However, not everyone is dealt a favourable hand in the game. When will those responsible for the wellbeing of our contact-sport athletes begin to educate them about the genuine risks of concussion?

— Shayne Christie, The Unspoken Truth: A Journey Through Concussion and CTE — The Untold Story of Best Friends and the Impact of Multiple Concussions in Contact Sports, 2024

=== The Billy Guyton Foundation ===
Especially after the 2023 death of his friend and fellow rugby player Billy Guyton, Christie became a campaigner for greater recognition of Chronic Traumatic Encephalopathy (CTE). His own symptoms worsened after Guyton's death, including "psychotic events" that winter. Guyton was posthumously confirmed to have CTE, a first in New Zealand rugby. Christie also believed himself to have CTE and was a founder of the Billy Guyton Foundation, which helps players with concussions.

Like Guyton, Christie pledged to donate his brain to medical science. This would eventually confirm a diagnosis of CTE, which can only be detected post-mortem.

== Death and CTE diagnosis ==
Christie died in Nelson on 27 August 2025. Hundreds of people attended his funeral in Nelson on 2 September.

Holly Parkes, Christie's former partner, observed that the last rugby team Christie played with was the 2016 Māori All Blacks, and that he was the third player (after Guyton and Sean Wainui) to die of suspected suicide.

His brain was donated to the National Brain Bank at the University of Auckland Faculty of Medical and Health Sciences where it was examined by a pathologist. His findings were published in April 2026, confirming "high stage" CTE. After Guyton, this was the second confirmed case of CTE in a New Zealand professional rugby player. Christie was also confirmed to have died by suicide.

All Black Carl Hayman, who has suspected CTE, said, "Shane wanted people to understand that he was sick, not depressed...Until NZR acknowledges and accepts there is a problem, cases will always be put down to issues around mental health, alcohol and lifestyle."

=== Coroner's inquest ===
Christie's death was referred to the coroner as a suspected suicide. Coroner Ian Telford consequently investigated Christie and Billy Guyton's deaths jointly.

By November 2026 Telford had not received everything that had been requested from NZR. Due to lacking evidence, he had not yet proceeded to an inquest. One search had resulted in 39 documents being provided to the coroner and 1091 held back as irrelevant. Not trusting NZR's judgement, Telford said he was "losing patience", and asked for all documents that had been found. He also criticised the search process.

== Career honours ==
All Blacks Sevens

- IRB Sevens World Series 2010–11

Highlanders

- Super Rugby winners – 2015

Tasman

- ITM Cup Championship winners – 2013
