= Liam Squire =

New Zealand rugby union player

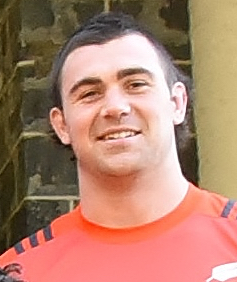
- Squire in 2017
- Full name: Liam Ivan John Squire
- Born: 20 March 1991 (age 35) Palmerston North, New Zealand
- Height: 1.96 m (6 ft 5 in)
- Weight: 113 kg (17 st 11 lb; 249 lb)
- School: Palmerston North Boys' High

Rugby union career
- Position(s): Flanker, Number 8
Senior career
Years	Team	Apps	(Points)
2011–2019	Tasman	47	(60)
2014–2015	Chiefs	13	(10)
2016–2019, 2021	Highlanders	35	(35)
2020	NTT DoCoMo Red Hurricanes	3	(5)
- Correct as of 25 May 2021
International career
Years	Team	Apps	(Points)
2013	Māori All Blacks	1	(0)
2016–2019	New Zealand	24	(25)
- Correct as of 19 August 2020

Liam Ivan John Squire (born 20 March 1991) is a former New Zealand rugby union player from Tokomaru, New Zealand. He played in the Number 8 and Blindside flanker position for Tasman in the Mitre 10 Cup. Squire joined the NTT DoCoMo Red Hurricanes in Japan on a two-year deal after the 2019 season but later made an early return to New Zealand in September 2020.

He is best-known for his three-year career as an All Black, playing 23 tests for New Zealand across that period, including 17 tests as a starting player.

Squire has previously played for New Zealand's Māori international side, the Māori All Blacks and for the Highlanders and Chiefs in Super Rugby.

== Career ==
=== Early career ===
Squire started his career with Tasman ahead of 2011 season's ITM Cup. After becoming a regular starter for Tasman, Squire was signed to the Chiefs for the 2014 Super Rugby season. Squire also played for the Chiefs in 2015.

After switching Super Rugby teams in 2016, heading south to the Highlanders and becoming a regular replacement for Elliot Dixon and Luke Whitelock off the bench, he was selected on 29 May 2016 for the All Blacks' 32-man squad for the Steinlager series against Wales. He made his All Blacks debut from the bench in last test of the series, a 46-6 win against Wales on 25 June 2016, replacing Dixon in the 55th minute. Squire was retained in the 33-man squad for the 2016 Rugby Championship and became a regular back-row and locking cover off the bench for the All Blacks during the competition in tandem with fellow newcomer Ardie Savea. Squire also made his first start for New Zealand in round 4 of the competition, starting against Argentina in a 36-17 win in Buenos Aires on 1 October. Squire received a yellow card in the 65th minute, being the second All Black carded that match after prop Joe Moody. Squire also scored his first international try for New Zealand the following week, in the final minute of the 57-18 win over South Africa.

Squire made two appearances for the All Blacks on the 2016 end-of-year tests, both of which were starts against Ireland. The first of those tests was a historic first-time loss to Ireland with a final score of 29-40.

=== 2017 ===
Squire became a regular starter for the Highlanders in the 2017 Super Rugby season, but missed the out on playing against the touring British and Irish Lions side and against Samoa due to a broken thumb sustained against the Cheetahs in a 45-41 win in Round 11 of Super Rugby. Vaea Fifita earned his first cap for the All Blacks in the test against Samoa due to Squire's absence. Squire made a recovery from injury to start for the Highlanders in Round 17 of Super Rugby, taking part in the 40-17 win over the Reds on 14 July. Squire started in the quarter-final against the Crusaders, but was yellow-carded for a late hit on Crusaders first-five and his future All Blacks teammate Richie Mo'unga, also costing his team three points for his late hit. The Highlanders lost the match 17-0 with the Crusaders going on to win the competition.

Squire was selected to start against Australia in the first Bledisloe Cup test of 2017, a 54-34 win. Squire scored the opening try of the match, off a pass from winger Rieko Ioane, being replaced by Ardie Savea following the performance. Squire made three more starts in the 2017 Rugby Championship, supplanting 81-test veteran Jerome Kaino as New Zealand's clear first-choice blindside flanker during the series. After recovering from an illness, Squire started in a non-capped test against a French XV on 14 November, scoring his third try for the All Blacks in the 28-23 win before making his way for All Blacks debutant Akira Ioane in the 53rd minute. Only four days later, Squire replaced Vaea Fifita off the bench against Scotland in a 22-17 win, before starting in the final test of the year against Wales which was won 33-18, ending his year with a dominant defensive performance against an inexperienced Welsh back-row.

=== 2018-2019 ===
Squire's ongoing injury troubles saw him miss many games for the Highlanders during the 2018 Super Rugby season, but he remained a first-choice player for New Zealand internationally. Squire started for the All Blacks in the first test against France, a 52-11 win, in tandem with Highlanders number 8, Luke Whitelock, while Sam Cane again partnered Squire from the side of the scrum.

During the 2018 Steinlager series, against France, Vaea Fifita replaced Squire at half-time during the second test, which was a 26-13 win. Squire and Fifita did not play in the last test of the series as they were both injured, allowing Squire's Highlanders teammates, Shannon Frizell and Jackson Hemopo to debut for the All Blacks in their absence.

Squire was retained for the 2018 Rugby Championship after the conclusion of Super Rugby. Squire remained as the first-choice blindside flanker, with Vaea Fifita dropped for Shannon Frizell and Jackson Hemopo. Squire dominated Australia during the first two Bledisloe Cup tests, in the first two rounds of the competition. Squire scored the fourth try of his international career in the second test, on 25 August, but lost out on Man of the Match, with All Black first-five, Beauden Barrett, scoring 30 points in the same test, allowing the All Blacks to once again retain the Bledisloe Cup after a 40-12 victory over the Wallabies.

He was given a rest after the first two Bledisloe Cup tests, allowing Shannon Frizell to serve time as his understudy. Squire was then bought back to play against South Africa, on 15 September 2018, but was replaced by the in-form Patrick Tuipulotu in the 59th minute, suffering from injury once again. The hand injury he suffered against South Africa, in the shocking 34-36 loss, caused him to miss the rest of the Rugby Championship, which New Zealand won once again.

The All Blacks' 2018 end-of-year tour saw Squire reselected after recovery from injury. Squire returned to his role as a regular starter, scoring the fourth test try of his career, in the third Bledisloe Cup test, on 27 October 2018, in a 37-20 victory against the Wallabies. Squire was replaced by Matt Todd in the 68th minute, with selectors wanting to save Squire's energy for tests against England and Ireland. Squire was rested for the Japan test the following week, flying straight to England alongside fellow members of the starting XV. After a poor performance against England, in a slim-margin 16-15 win, Squire was then injured yet again against Ireland, being replaced by Scott Barrett only 32 minutes into New Zealand's 9-16 loss to the Irish. He didn't know it then but, that was his last game for the All Blacks. The re-called Vaea Fifita then started in Squire's place, for the final test of the year, against Italy, producing a dominant performance.

Squire only played 8 tests during 2018, leaving his role as a regular starter questioned by the media, following Vaea Fifita's re-call and the outstanding performances of Ardie Savea, which have left worrying opinions towards Squire's international career.

In the 2019 Super Rugby season, Squire did not get much game time due to recurring injuries, which saw him sign for Osaka-based club, NTT DoCoMo Red Hurricanes, joining Highlanders teammate, Marty Banks amongst the Red Hurricanes' playing ranks. Squire's 2019 Mitre 10 Cup campaign will be his last for the province, with rookie Luke Jacobson selected over Squire for New Zealand.

On 12 October 2021, Squire announced his retirement from all rugby due to a recurring knee injury.

== Personal life ==
In 2019, Squire asked All Blacks coaches not to consider him for selection. Squire claimed on social media, that mental health issues, stemming from injuries and the pressure of test rugby, were contributing factors towards his reluctance to play internationally, which saw him gain widespread support and praise from fans and players alike. Squire missed selection for the 2019 Rugby World Cup, but was praised by All Blacks Head Coach, Steve Hansen, for making a "brave call". Hansen claimed that Squire would still be considered for selection in the event of injuries to other players.
