= Chris Smylie =

NZ rugby union player (born 1982)

- Full name: Christopher Bradley Smylie
- Born: 22 March 1982 (age 44) Auckland, New Zealand
- Height: 182 cm (6 ft 0 in)
- Weight: 92 kg (203 lb; 14 st 7 lb)
- School: Massey High School

Rugby union career
- Position: Half-back
Senior career
Years	Team	Apps	(Points)
2002–2017	North Harbour	71	(45)
2005–2007	Otago	34	(25)
2006	Highlanders	10	(0)
2007–2017	Hurricanes	43	(10)
2009–2011	Blues	28	(10)
2012–2014	Taranaki	25	(5)
2015–2016	Benetton	22	(5)
- Correct as of 11 May 2019
International career
Years	Team	Apps	(Points)
2006–2014	Māori All Blacks	13	(0)
2009	Junior All Blacks	3	(0)
- Correct as of 11 May 2019
National sevens team
Years	Team		Comps
2002	New Zealand		2
- Correct as of 11 May 2019

Christopher Bradley Smylie (born 22 March 1982) is a New Zealand rugby union player. He plays in the scrum-half position for Taranaki in the ITM Cup. He was born in Greater Auckland and attended Massey High School. In 2002 he made his professional debut for North Harbour against Auckland in the National Provincial Championship. Smylie then went south and had one season for the Highlanders in 2006, off the back of a hugely impressive debut season for Otago in 2005. The following year he played for the New Zealand Māori and in 2007 saw him play for the Hurricanes in Super Rugby, before debuting in 2009 for North Harbour in the Air New Zealand Cup.

Smylie was named NPC Division One Player of the Year for 2005, after a strong campaign which saw Otago finish runners-up behind Auckland. Despite this, he was not the first choice starting halfback for the Highlanders in 2006, with Southland halfback Jimmy Cowan often being preferred. In the 2007 Super 14 season he was drafted into the Hurricanes where he was sharing the halfback role with Alby Mathewson until Piri Weepu came back from the All Blacks protected squad. In 2012 Smylie returned to the Hurricanes and signed with Taranaki.

== International career ==
Smylie kicked off his international career with the New Zealand Sevens team in 2002 where he played in two IRB Sevens tournaments in Singapore and Malaysia.

In 2006, Smylie had been named in the New Zealand Māori squad for the Churchill Cup. In the second test against USA he made his debut as starting Half-back, the New Zealand Māori went on winning the game 74 - 6. He then retained his starting spot against the Ireland Wolfhounds and also got to start in 2006 Churchill Cup final against Scotland A. In 2007 he secured a permanent position as the Half-back with the New Zealand Māori side during the 2007 Churchill Cup. He started in all three matches against Canada, the Ireland Wolfhounds and including the final against the England Saxons. In 2008 he continued his career with the New Zealand Māori during 2008 IRB Pacific Nations Cup. He had only started one match against Fiji, after Piri Weepu joined the squad.

Smylie then was named in the Junior All Blacks side in 2009. He started two out of the three matches against Samoa and Fiji and then came off the bench against Tonga. He then returned to the New Zealand Māori for their 2010 Sealord Centenary Series. He suffered a fractured cheekbone after the match against the New Zealand Barbarians which finished his career for the New Zealand Māori in 2010.

== Provincial Rugby ==
Smylie started his first class career at North Harbour, whom he played five times for in 2002 and 2003. Aged only 20, he made his debut for North Harbour against Auckland in 2002, in round three of the competition.

In 2004, Smylie went on and moved south to Otago to play a full season in the 2004 National Provincial Championship.

Smylie was named NPC Division One Player of the Year for 2005, after a strong campaign which saw Otago finish runners-up behind Auckland. In 2005, starting Otago's mid-year encounter against the British and Irish Lions on the bench behind former Hurricane and All Black Danny Lee, Smylie went on to make 12 straight appearances at number nine for Otago. even including the NPC final. This included a man of the match performance for the southerners in a 26–10 win over Wellington at Westpac Stadium.
