= Robbie Robinson (rugby union) =

New Zealand rugby union player

Robert Robinson
- Born: Robert Blair Robinson; 22 August 1989 (age 37) Westport, New Zealand
- Height: 1.81 m (5 ft 11 in)
- Weight: 84 kg (13 st 3 lb)
- School: Southland Boys' High School

Rugby union career
- Position(s): First five-eighth, Fullback
Senior career
Years	Team	Apps	(Points)
2008–2013	Southland	57	(258)
2010–2011	Highlanders	20	(54)
2012–2013	Chiefs	24	(15)
2014	North Harbour	8	(8)
2015–2017	Toyota Verblitz	23	(23)
2017–2020	Ricoh Black Rams	35	(115)
2018-2020	Sunwolves	5	(0)
2022	Toyota Industries Shuttles Aichi	5	(28)
- Correct as of 25 April 2022
International career
Years	Team	Apps	(Points)
2009	New Zealand U20	6	(29)
2010–2014	Māori All Blacks	6	(23)
- Correct as of 25 April 2021

Robert Blair Robinson (born 22 August 1989) is a professional rugby union player who represents Toyota Industries Shuttles Aichi in the Japan.

== Playing career ==
Robinson made his debut for Southland in round three of the 2008 Air New Zealand Cup against the Hawke's Bay Magpies. He played most games at fullback rather than his favored first five-eighth position because the competition's top scorer, Blair Stewart, had cemented the role for the season.

In 2009 Robinson was selected for the New Zealand Under 20s team for the Junior World Cup in Japan. Robinson played the majority of the tournament at fullback due to the team's captain Aaron Cruden being a specialist first five-eighth. The team went through the tournament unbeaten, defeating England 44–28 in the final.

His season continued with Southland making a strong start to the competition, finishing second after 8 rounds of the 2009 Air New Zealand Cup. However, a string of poor performances meant the team needed to win their final round Ranfurly Shield challenge against Canterbury. The team came out victorious, with Robinson kicking three penalties to lead the Stags to a win and end the 50-year shield drought.

His form led to him securing a Highlanders contract for the 2010 and 2011 Super Rugby seasons. In 2012, after two years with the Highlanders, he signed with the Chiefs, with his contract extending until the 2014 season.

He scored the Chiefs' winning try in the 2013 Super Rugby final in a 27–22 win against the Brumbies.

The Chiefs released him in 2014 after a frustrating injury that kept him out for the entire campaign.

On June 24, 2022, he was announced as having signed for the Southland Stags for the 2022 Bunnings NPC.
