= 2005 National Provincial Championship =

Rugby union competition

The 2005 season was the 30th and final year of the National Provincial Championship (NPC), a provincial rugby union competition in New Zealand, in its original format. Auckland were the winners of Division 1, Hawke's Bay were the winners of Division 2, and Wairarapa Bush were the winners of Division 3.

== Division 1 ==
=== Standings ===
Pos	Team	Pld	W	D	L	PF	PA	PD	TF	TA	TB	LB	Pts
1	Canterbury – RS	9	7	1	1	234	138	+94	25	14	4	1	35
2	Auckland	9	7	0	2	290	219	+71	32	28	5	0	33
3	North Harbour	9	6	1	2	280	158	+122	34	16	6	0	32
4	Otago	9	6	0	3	218	145	+73	24	16	3	1	28
5	Wellington	9	5	0	4	268	204	+64	32	22	4	2	26
6	Southland	9	4	0	5	200	256	–56	20	31	1	2	19
7	Waikato	9	4	0	5	203	199	+4	23	20	1	1	18
8	Bay of Plenty	9	3	0	6	188	241	−53	23	25	3	2	17
9	Taranaki	9	2	0	7	164	215	−51	20	20	2	3	13
10	Northland	9	0	0	9	97	367	−270	11	52	0	1	1

=== Results ===
==== Round 1 ====
12 August

Waikato	30–6	Taranaki
Try: Mark Ranby, Isaac Boss, Richard Kahui; Con: David Hill (3); Pen: David Hill (3)		Pen: Todd Feather (2)

Waikato Stadium, Hamilton
Referee: Lyndon Bray

13 August

Southland	16–42	Canterbury
Try: Jimmy Cowan; Con: Matt Petre; Pen: Matt Petre (3)		Try: Scott Hamilton (3), Jamie Nutbrown, Mose Tuiali'i; Con: Ben Blair (4); Pen: Ben Blair (3)

Rugby Park Stadium, Invercargill
Referee: Bryce Lawrence

13 August

Northland	27–43	Wellington
Try: Mike Rowe, Tim Dow, David Holwell; Con: David Holwell (3); Pen: David Holwell (2)		Try: Ma'a Nonu (3), Jimmy Gopperth (2), Lome Fa'atau, Roy Kinikinilau; Con: Jimmy Gopperth (4)

Okara Park, Whangārei
Referee: Gary Wise

13 August

North Harbour	10–27	Auckland
Try: Brent Wilson; Con: Andrew Whiteman; Pen: Andrew Whiteman		Try: Tony Koonwaiyou, Brad Mika, Isa Nacewa; Con: Brent Ward (3); Pen: Brent Ward (2)

North Harbour Stadium, Albany
Referee: Kelvin Deaker

14 August

Otago	29–6	Bay of Plenty
Try: Chris King, Neil Brew, Hayden Pedersen, Josh Blackie; Con: Nick Evans (3); Pen: Nick Evans		Pen: Murray Williams (2)

Carisbrook, Dunedin
Referee: J. M. White

==== Round 2 ====
19 August

Wellington	16–29	North Harbour
Try: Jimmy Gopperth; Con: Jimmy Gopperth; Pen: Jimmy Gopperth (3)		Try: Vili Waqaseduadua (2), Junior Poluleuligaga, Zar Lawrence; Con: Luke McAlister (3); Pen: Luke McAlister

Wellington Regional Stadium, Wellington
Attendance: 16,936
Referee: Paul Honiss

20 August

Canterbury	40–13	Bay of Plenty
Try: Casey Laulala, Scott Hamilton, Greg Somerville, Cameron McIntyre; Con: Ben Blair (3), Leon MacDonald; Pen: Ben Blair (4)		Try: Anthony Tahana; Con: Murray Williams; Pen: Murray Williams (2)

Lancaster Park, Christchurch
Attendance: 19,000
Referee: Lyndon Bray

20 August

Taranaki	32–8	Northland
Try: Joe Lawn, James Hilgendorf, Andrew Hore, Sisa Koyamaibole; Con: Todd Feather (3); Pen: Todd Feather (2)		Try: Tim Dow; Pen: David Holwell

Yarrow Stadium, New Plymouth
Attendance: 5,000
Referee: Chris Pollock

20 August

Otago	16–31	Auckland
Try: Alando Soakai; Con: Nick Evans; Pen: Nick Evans (3)		Try: Sam Tuitupou, Doug Howlett, Jerome Kaino, Brent Ward; Con: Brent Ward (4); Pen: Brent Ward

Carisbrook, Dunedin
Attendance: 4,000
Referee: Bryce Lawrence

21 August

Southland	12–14	Waikato
Pen: Matt Petre (4)		Try: Sione Lauaki, Marty Holah; Con: David Hill (2)

Rugby Park Stadium, Invercargill
Attendance: 5,000
Referee: Gary Wise

==== Round 3 ====
26 August

Wellington	10–26	Otago
Try: Shannon Paku; Con: Jimmy Gopperth; Pen: Jimmy Gopperth		Try: Chris Smylie, Matt Saunders; Con: Nick Evans (2); Pen: Nick Evans (4)

Wellington Regional Stadium, Wellington
Attendance: 16,723
Referee: Bryce Lawrence

27 August

Northland	7–38	Waikato
Try: Aaron Wright; Con: David Holwell		Try: Stephen Donald, Sitiveni Sivivatu, Brendon Leonard, Keith Lowen, Derek Maisey; Con: Stephen Donald (5); Pen: Stephen Donald

Okara Park, Whangārei
Attendance: 4,000
Referee: J.M. White

27 August

North Harbour	23–23	Canterbury
Try: Anthony Tuitavake (2), Tom Harding; Con: Tusi Pisi; Pen: Tusi Pisi (2)		Try: Kevin O'Neill, Casey Laulala; Con: Ben Blair (2); Pen: Ben Blair (3)

North Harbour Stadium, Albany
Attendance: 6,000
Referee: Gary Wise

28 August

Bay of Plenty	18–17	Taranaki
Try: Wayne Ormond, Grant McQuoid; Con: Murray Williams; Pen: Murray Williams (2)		Try: Andrew Suniula, Chris Masoe; Con: Todd Feather, Sam Young; Pen: Sam Young

Blue Chip Stadium, Tauranga
Attendance: 4,800
Referee: Chris Rooney

28 August

Auckland	38–37	Southland
Try: Isa Nacewa, Justin Collins, Angus MacDonald, James Somerset; Con: Brent Ward (3); Pen: Brent Ward (4)		Try: Watisoni Lotawa (2), Paul Miller (2), Pehi Te Whare; Con: Richard Apanui (3); Pen: Richard Apanui (2)

Eden Park, Auckland
Attendance: 10,500
Referee: Chris Pollock

==== Round 4 ====
2 September

Waikato	17–41	Wellington
Try: David Hill (2); Con: David Hill (2); Pen: David Hill		Try: Ross Filipo (2), Ma'a Nonu, Thomas Waldrom, Ross Kennedy; Con: Jimmy Gopperth (5); Pen: Jimmy Gopperth (2)

Waikato Stadium, Hamilton
Referee: Gary Wise

3 September

Canterbury	13–11	Taranaki
Try: Scott Hamilton; Con: Ben Blair; Pen: Ben Blair (2)		Try: Tony Penn; Pen: Sam Young (2)

Lancaster Park, Christchurch
Referee: Steve Walsh

3 September

Southland	28–22	Otago
Try: Hoani MacDonald, Kane Thompson, Pehi Te Whare; Con: Richard Apanui (2); Pen: Richard Apanui (3)		Try: Matt Saunders, Seilala Mapusua, Tom Donnelly; Con: Nick Evans (2); Pen: Nick Evans

Rugby Park Stadium, Invercargill
Referee: Chris Pollock

4 September

North Harbour	56–17	Northland
Try: Nick Williams (3), Anthony Tuitavake, Zar Lawrence, Tony Coughlan, George Pisi, Joe Ward, Tom Harding; Con: Jon Elrick (3), Joel Nasmith; Pen: Jon Elrick		Try: Allen Tubbs, Manu Burkhardt-McRae; Con: David Holwell (2); Pen: David Holwell

North Harbour Stadium, Albany
Referee: Bryce Lawrence

4 September

Bay of Plenty	30–41	Auckland
Try: Wayne Ormond, Adrian Cashmore, Aleki Lutui, Anthony Tahana; Con: Murray Williams (2); Pen: Murray Williams (2)		Try: Isa Nacewa (2), Daniel Braid, Tony Koonwaiyou, Jerome Kaino; Con: Brent Ward (2); Pen: Brent Ward (4)

Blue Chip Stadium, Tauranga
Referee: Lyndon Bray

==== Round 5 ====
9 September

Otago	21–13	North Harbour
Try: Chris King, Jason MacDonald; Con: Nick Evans; Pen: Nick Evans (3)		Try: Brent Wilson; Con: Luke McAlister; Pen: Luke McAlister (2)

Carisbrook, Dunedin
Referee: Paul Honiss

10 September

Wellington	38–32	Bay of Plenty
Try: Shannon Paku, Ma'a Nonu, Roy Kinikinilau, Thomas Waldrom; Con: Jimmy Gopperth (3); Pen: Jimmy Gopperth (4)		Try: Grant McQuoid, Mark Sorenson, Kevin Senio, Anthony Tahana; Con: Murray Williams (3); Pen: Murray Williams (2)

Wellington Regional Stadium, Wellington
Attendance: 19,554
Referee: Steve Walsh

10 September

Northland	10–32	Canterbury
Try: Jake Paringatai; Con: David Holwell; Pen: David Holwell		Try: Ben Blair, Cameron McIntyre, Steven Yates, Jamie Nutbrown; Con: Ben Blair (3); Pen: Ben Blair (2)

Okara Park, Whangārei
Referee: J.M. White

10 September

Auckland	40–30	Waikato
Try: Derren Witcombe (2), Tony Koonwaiyou, Ben Atiga, Sam Tuitupou; Con: Brent Ward (3); Pen: Brent Ward (3)		Try: Steven Bates, Liam Messam, Stephen Donald; Con: David Hill (3); Pen: David Hill (3)

Eden Park, Auckland
Referee: Gary Wise

11 September

Taranaki	28–33	Southland
Try: Scott Breman, Matt Harvey, Scott Ireland; Con: Sam Young (2); Pen: Sam Young (3)		Try: Ben Smith (2), Watisoni Lotawa; Con: Richard Apanui (3); Pen: Richard Apanui (4)

Yarrow Stadium, New Plymouth
Referee: Bryce Lawrence

==== Round 6 ====
16 September

Bay of Plenty	8–41	North Harbour
Try: David Johnston; Pen: Mike Delany		Try: Zar Lawrence, Tom Harding, Adrian Donald, Joel Nasmith; Con: Luke McAlister (2), Joel Nasmith; Pen: Luke McAlister (5)

Rotorua International Stadium, Rotorua
Referee: J.M. White

17 September

Taranaki	40–19	Auckland
Try: James Hilgendorf, Andrew Hore, Paul Tito, Sam Young, Chris Masoe, Jason Eaton; Con: Sam Young (5)		Try: Brad Mika; Con: Brent Ward; Pen: Brent Ward (4)

Yarrow Stadium, New Plymouth
Referee: Steve Walsh

17 September

Wellington	53–12	Southland
Try: Roy Kinikinilau (3), Shannon Paku (2), Thomas Waldrom, Conrad Smith; Con: Jimmy Gopperth (6); Pen: Jimmy Gopperth (2)		Try: Watisoni Lotawa, Mana Harrison; Con: Richard Apanui

Wellington Regional Stadium, Wellington
Attendance: 15,035
Referee: Paul Honiss

17 September

Canterbury	23–15	Waikato
Try: Caleb Ralph, Vilimone Delasau; Con: Ben Blair (2); Pen: Ben Blair (3)		Try: Byron Kelleher, Keith Lowen; Con: David Hill; Pen: David Hill

Lancaster Park, Christchurch
Referee: Lyndon Bray

18 September

Northland	3–41	Otago
Pen: David Holwell		Try: Nick Evans, Jason MacDonald, Matt Saunders, Craig Clare, Seilala Mapusua; Con: Nick Evans (4), Callum Bruce; Pen: Nick Evans, Callum Bruce

Okara Park, Whangārei
Referee: Kelvin Deaker

==== Round 7 ====
23 September

Canterbury	15–14	Wellington
Pen: Ben Blair (5)		Try: Lome Fa'atau; Pen: Jimmy Gopperth (3)

Lancaster Park, Christchurch
Attendance: 18,500
Referee: Bryce Lawrence

24 September

Auckland	53–7	Northland
Try: Tony Koonwaiyou (2), Isaia Toeava (2), Angus MacDonald, Tasesa Lavea, Saimone Taumoepeau, Isa Nacewa; Con: Isa Nacewa (4), Brad Mika; Pen: Isa Nacewa		Try: Tim Dow; Con: Josh Levi

Eden Park, Auckland
Attendance: 10,112
Referee: Kelvin Deaker

24 September

Otago	26–10	Taranaki
Try: Anton Oliver (2); Con: Nick Evans (2); Pen: Nick Evans (4)		Try: Craig Fevre; Con: Todd Feather; Pen: Sam Young

Carisbrook, Dunedin
Attendance: 6,500
Referee: Gary Wise

24 September

Southland	19–13	Bay of Plenty
Try: Watisoni Lotawa; Con: Richard Apanui; Pen: Richard Apanui (3); Drop: Jimmy Cowan		Try: Adrian Cashmore; Con: Mike Delany; Pen: Mike Delany (2)

Rugby Park Stadium, Invercargill
Attendance: 8,500
Referee: Steve Walsh

25 September

North Harbour	40–21	Waikato
Try: Anthony Tuitavake (2), Luke McAlister, Sam Harding; Con: Luke McAlister (4); Pen: Luke McAlister (4)		Try: Liam Messam, Willie Ripia; Con: David Hill; Pen: David Hill (3)

North Harbour Stadium, Albany
Attendance: 7,500
Referee: Lyndon Bray

==== Round 8 ====
30 September

Auckland	29–22	Wellington
Try: Daniel Braid, Brad Mika; Con: Brent Ward (2); Pen: Brent Ward (5)		Try: Lome Fa'atau (2), Ma'a Nonu; Con: Jimmy Gopperth (2); Pen: Jimmy Gopperth

Eden Park, Auckland
Referee: Gary Wise

1 October

Otago	24–19	Canterbury
Try: Neil Brew (2), Matt Saunders, Nick Evans; Con: Nick Evans (2)		Try: Johnny Leo'o, Richie McCaw, Andy Ellis; Con: Ben Blair (2)

Carisbrook, Dunedin
Referee: Paul Honiss

1 October

Waikato	13–17	Bay of Plenty
Try: Richard Kahui; Con: David Hill; Pen: David Hill (2)		Try: Nili Latu, Anthony Tahana; Con: Mike Delany (2); Pen: Mike Delany

Waikato Stadium, Hamilton
Referee: Steve Walsh

1 October

North Harbour	37–3	Taranaki
Try: Junior Poluleuligaga, Joe Ward, Nick Williams, Vili Waqaseduadua; Con: Luke McAlister (4); Pen: Luke McAlister		Pen: Sam Young

North Harbour Stadium, Albany
Referee: Lyndon Bray

2 October

Northland	15–21	Southland
Try: Isoa Neivua, David Holwell; Con: David Holwell; Pen: David Holwell		Try: Watisoni Lotawa, Jason Rutledge; Con: Richard Apanui; Pen: Richard Apanui (3)

Okara Park, Whangārei
Referee: Bryce Lawrence

==== Round 9 ====
7 October

Taranaki	17–31	Wellington
Try: Hamish Mitchell, Sailosi Tagicakibau, Lifeimi Mafi; Con: Todd Feather		Try: Jerry Collins, Tana Umaga, Ma'a Nonu; Con: Jimmy Gopperth (2); Pen: Piri Weepu (3), Jimmy Gopperth

Yarrow Stadium, New Plymouth
Referee: Steve Walsh

8 October

Waikato	25–13	Otago
Try: Sosene Anesi, Stephen Donald, David Hill; Con: Stephen Donald (2); Pen: Stephen Donald (2)		Try: Jason Shoemark; Con: Nick Evans; Pen: Nick Evans (2)

Waikato Stadium, Hamilton
Referee: Kelvin Deaker

8 October

Bay of Plenty	51–3	Northland
Try: Kevin Senio (2), Apoua Stewart (2), Simms Davison, Grant McQuoid, Paul Tupai, Tanerau Latimer; Con: Mike Delany (3), Paul Tupai; Pen: Mike Delany		Pen: David Holwell

Blue Chip Stadium, Tauranga
Referee: Keith Brown (replaced by Ben Skeen)

8 October

Canterbury	27–12	Auckland
Try: Ben Blair, Corey Flynn, Reuben Thorne, Scott Hamilton; Con: Dan Carter (2); Pen: Dan Carter		Pen: Brent Ward (4)

Lancaster Park, Christchurch
Referee: Paul Honiss

9 October

Southland	22–31	North Harbour
Try: Ben Smith (2), Paul Miller; Con: Richard Apanui (2); Pen: Richard Apanui		Try: Vili Waqaseduadua, Tom Harding, George Pisi, Craig McGrath; Con: Luke McAlister (4); Pen: Luke McAlister

Rugby Park Stadium, Invercargill
Referee: Chris Pollock

=== Play-offs ===
==== Semi-finals ====
14 October

Canterbury	22–37	Otago
Try: Ben Blair, Richie McCaw, Scott Hamilton; Con: Dan Carter (2); Pen: Dan Carter		Try: Chris Smylie (2), Craig Newby, Craig Clare, Josh Blackie; Con: Nick Evans (3); Pen: Nick Evans (2)

Lancaster Park, Christchurch
Referee: Steve Walsh

15 October

Auckland	38–24	North Harbour
Try: Angus MacDonald (2), Keven Mealamu, Doug Howlett, Joe Rokocoko, Mils Muliaina; Con: Brent Ward (4)		Try: Vili Waqaseduadua (2), George Pisi, Anthony Tuitavake; Con: Luke McAlister (2)

Eden Park, Auckland
Referee: Bryce Lawrence

==== Grand Final ====
22 October

Auckland	39–11	Otago
Try: Keven Mealamu, Doug Howlett, Brad Mika, Ben Atiga, Mils Muliaina, Taniela Moa; Con: Brent Ward (3); Pen: Brent Ward		Try: Josh Blackie; Pen: Nick Evans (2)

Eden Park, Auckland
Referee: Steve Walsh

== Division 2 ==
=== Standings ===
Pos	Team	Pld	W	D	L	PF	PA	PD	TF	TA	TB	LB	Pts
1	Hawke's Bay	8	8	0	0	362	117	+245	54	16	8	0	40
2	Counties Manukau	8	7	0	1	320	162	+158	44	18	7	0	35
3	Nelson Bays	8	5	0	3	289	192	+97	39	29	3	0	23
4	North Otago	8	4	0	4	285	228	+67	36	32	4	2	22
5	Marlborough	8	4	0	4	201	183	+18	26	23	3	1	20
6	Manawatu	8	3	0	5	155	200	−45	20	27	2	1	15
7	Wanganui	8	2	0	6	156	197	−41	20	24	3	2	13
8	Poverty Bay	8	3	0	5	161	298	−137	20	30	1	0	13
9	East Coast	8	0	0	8	71	423	−362	8	62	0	0	0

=== Results ===
==== Round 1 ====
13 August

Hawke's Bay (MC)	42–25	Nelson Bays
Try: Mutu Ngarimu, Ray Karauria, Sona Taumalolo, Karl Mudzamba, Ben Allen; Con: Donovan Nepia (3), James Rosenberg; Pen: Donovan Nepia (3)		Try: Mace Poloie, Robbie Malneek, Rudolph Meredith; Con: Tim Taylor (2); Pen: Tim Taylor (2)

McLean Park, Napier
Referee: Vinnie Munro

13 August

Wanganui	6–17	Manawatu (BSC)
Pen: Lee Peina (2)		Try: Illiki Naikatini; Pen: Jonathan Hargreaves (3), Graham Smith

Cooks Gardens, Wanganui
Referee: Chris Pollock

13 August

Counties Manukau	67–24	Poverty Bay
Try: Niva Ta'auso (3), Lelia Masaga (2), Tim Manawatu (2), Eroni Clarke, Kevin Farrell, Jeffrey Maka; Con: Troy Nathan (7); Pen: Troy Nathan		Try: Mosese Luveitasau, Aaron Good, Hone Kaa; Con: Douglas Sanft (3); Pen: Douglas Sanft

Growers Stadium, Pukekohe
Referee: Chris Rooney

13 August

North Otago	69–13	East Coast
Try: Adam Kettle (3), Scott Mayhew (2), Mike Mavor, Hotili Asi, Luke Herden, K. Fangipou, Ray Ofisa; Con: Matt Adair (8); Pen: Matt Adair		Try: Adrian Collier; Con: Ben Aoina; Pen: Ben Aoina (2)

Centennial Park, Oamaru
Referee: Keith Brown

Bye: Marlborough

==== Round 2 ====
20 August

Poverty Bay	69–13	Wanganui

Rugby Park, Gisborne

20 August

Nelson Bays	69–13	Manawatu

Trafalgar Park, Nelson

20 August

North Otago	27–28	Marlborough

Centennial Park, Oamaru

20 August

Counties Manukau	31–40	Hawke's Bay
Try: Tevita Tuifua (2), Eroni Clarke, Lelia Masaga; Con: Troy Nathan (4); Pen: Troy Nathan		Try: Shepherd (2), Lokotui, Karauria, Evans; Con: Donovan Nepia (3); Pen: Clarke (2), Donovan Nepia

Growers Stadium, Pukekohe
Referee: B.A. Murray

Bye: East Coast

==== Round 3 ====
27 August

Nelson Bays	49–19	North Otago

Trafalgar Park, Nelson

27 August

East Coast	6–53	Counties Manukau
Pen: Ben Aoina (2)		Try: Koiatu Koiatu (2), Troy Nathan (2), Taiasina Tuifu'a, Tevita Tuifua, Andrew van der Heijden; Con: Troy Nathan (6); Pen: Troy Nathan (2)

Whakarua Park, Ruatoria
Referee: M.L. Peters

27 August

Marlborough	38–11	Poverty Bay

Lansdowne Park, Blenheim

27 August

Manawatu	10–45	Hawke's Bay

Arena Manawatu, Palmerston North

Bye: Wanganui

==== Round 4 ====
3 September

Wanganui	6–27	Counties Manukau
		Try: Tim Manawatu (2), Waka Setitaia, Mark Price; Con: Troy Nathan (2); Pen: Troy Nathan

Cooks Gardens, Wanganui
Referee: Ben Skeen

3 September

Marlborough	18–25	Nelson Bays

Lansdowne Park, Blenheim

3 September

Manawatu	27–47	North Otago

Arena Manawatu, Palmerston North

3 September

Hawke's Bay (MC)	79–0	East Coast

McLean Park, Napier
Referee: J.B. Noonan

Bye: Poverty Bay

==== Round 5 ====
10 September

East Coast	14–34	Wanganui
Try: Marty Lloyd, Adrian Collier; Con: Ben Aoina (2)

Whakarua Park, Ruatoria
Referee: Chris Rooney

10 September

Hawke's Bay (MC)	32–10	Marlborough

McLean Park, Napier

10 September

Poverty Bay	23–22	Manawatu

Rugby Park, Gisborne

10 September

Counties Manukau	41–36	North Otago
Try: Lelia Masaga (2), Koiatu Koiatu, Jeffrey Maka, Troy Nathan; Con: Troy Nathan (5); Pen: Troy Nathan (2)

Growers Stadium, Pukekohe
Referee: Vinnie Munro

Bye: Nelson Bays

==== Round 6 ====
17 September

Nelson Bays	33–42	Counties Manukau
		Try: Lelia Masaga (2), Eroni Clarke, Niva Ta'auso, Tevita Tuifua; Con: Troy Nathan (4); Pen: Troy Nathan (3)

Trafalgar Park, Nelson
Referee: Keith Brown

17 September

East Coast	5–26	Poverty Bay
Try: Ben Aoina

Whakarua Park, Ruatoria
Referee: D.R. Luckin

17 September

North Otago	6–29	Hawke's Bay

Centennial Park, Oamaru

17 September

Marlborough	28–26	Wanganui

Lansdowne Park, Blenheim

Bye: Manawatu

==== Round 7 ====
24 September

Wanganui	28–31	North Otago

Cooks Gardens, Wanganui

24 September

Poverty Bay	20–52	Hawke's Bay

Rugby Park, Gisborne

24 September

Nelson Bays	68–13	East Coast
		Try: Magisi Kaho; Con: Ben Aoina; Pen: Ben Aoina; Drop: Ben Aoina

Trafalgar Park, Nelson
Referee: Matt Stanish

24 September

Manawatu	24–14	Marlborough

Arena Manawatu, Palmerston North

Bye: Counties Manukau

==== Round 8 ====
1 October

Poverty Bay	22–50	Nelson Bays

Rugby Park, Gisborne

1 October

East Coast	7–36	Manawatu
Try: Tainui Forrester; Con: Ben Aoina

Whakarua Park, Ruatoria
Referee: B.A. Murray

1 October

Counties Manukau	25–7	Marlborough
Try: Tevita Tuifua (2), Lelia Masaga; Con: Troy Nathan (2); Pen: Troy Nathan (2)

Growers Stadium, Pukekohe
Referee: Kelvin Deaker

1 October

Hawke's Bay (MC)	43–15	Wanganui

McLean Park, Napier

Bye: North Otago

==== Round 9 ====
8 October

Wanganui	27–15	Nelson Bays

Cooks Gardens, Wanganui

8 October

North Otago	50–13	Poverty Bay

Centennial Park, Oamaru

8 October

Manawatu	10–34	Counties Manukau
		Try: Tim Manawatu (4), Troy Nathan, Tarris Chi-Tar

Arena Manawatu, Palmerston North
Referee: J.M. White

8 October

Marlborough	58–13	East Coast
		Try: Te Naera Waimotu, Tanginoa Nimo; Pen: Ben Aoina

Lansdowne Park, Blenheim
Referee: Chris Rooney

Bye: Hawke's Bay

=== Play-offs ===
==== Semi-finals ====
15 October

Hawke's Bay	15–11	North Otago

McLean Park, Napier

16 October

Counties Manukau	37–39	Nelson Bays
Try: Troy Nathan (2), Lelia Masaga, Tim Manawatu, Sekope Kepu; Con: Troy Nathan (3); Pen: Troy Nathan (2)

Growers Stadium, Pukekohe
Referee: Kelvin Deaker

==== Grand Final ====
22 October

Hawke's Bay	32–17	Nelson Bays

McLean Park, Napier

== Division 3 ==
Pos	Team	Pld	W	D	L	PF	PA	PD	TF	TA	TB	LB	Pts
1	Wairarapa Bush	7	6	0	1	257	94	+163	37	10	6	1	31
2	Horowhenua-Kapiti	7	6	0	1	189	123	+66	29	15	4	0	28
3	King Country	7	5	0	2	220	107	+113	30	14	3	2	25
4	Buller	7	5	0	2	153	149	+4	17	19	2	0	22
5	Mid Canterbury	7	2	0	5	108	149	−41	9	18	1	2	11
6	Thames Valley	7	2	0	5	131	185	−54	13	24	1	1	10
7	South Canterbury	7	2	0	5	98	191	−93	13	25	1	1	10
8	West Coast	7	0	0	7	79	237	−158	11	34	0	2	2

Semi-finals

- Horowhenua-Kapiti 37-5 King Country
- Wairarapa Bush 20-14 Buller

Grand final

- Wairarapa Bush 28-23 Horowhenua-Kapiti
