= 2007 Air New Zealand Cup =

2007 rugby union competition in New Zealand

- Countries: New Zealand
- Date: 26 July – 20 October
- Champions: Auckland
- Runners-up: Wellington
- Matches played: 77
- Top point scorer: Jimmy Gopperth (155)
- Top try scorer: Brent Ward (8)

The 2007 National Provincial Championship was the second season of the National Provincial Championship (known as the Air New Zealand Cup for sponsorship reasons), a provincial rugby union competition involving 14 teams from New Zealand. Matches started on 26 July 2007, and the Final, in which Auckland defeated Wellington, was held on 20 October.

This season was the second of the expanded competition, which succeeded the First Division of the National Provincial Championship. There were some major changes to the competition from that of the 2006 season. The original Rounds One (initial pool play) and Two (Top Six and Repechage phases) were scrapped. Instead, there was a 10-week round robin in which every team will miss out on playing 3 teams in the competition. This was followed by the quarterfinals, semifinal and the final as in 2006.

Unless otherwise noted the information is sourced from here:

== Standings ==
The top eight teams in pool play advanced to the quarterfinals.

Pos	Name	Pld	W	D	L	F	A	+/−	TB	LB	Pts
1	Auckland	10	10	0	0	371	145	+226	8	0	48
2	Canterbury	10	9	0	1	351	135	+216	6	0	42
3	Wellington	10	8	0	2	354	172	+182	6	1	39
4	Hawke's Bay	10	7	0	3	254	221	+33	5	1	34
5	Waikato	10	6	0	4	289	231	+58	3	1	28
6	Southland	10	6	0	4	231	203	+28	1	1	26
7	Otago	10	5	1	4	213	275	−81	1	1	24
8	Taranaki	10	4	0	6	218	234	−16	3	4	23
9	North Harbour	10	4	2	4	222	267	−45	2	0	22
10	Northland	10	3	1	6	206	214	−8	1	4	19
11	Tasman	10	2	0	8	184	262	−59	0	4	12
12	Manawatu	10	2	1	7	158	331	−173	1	0	11
13	Bay of Plenty	10	1	0	9	154	297	−143	2	3	9
14	Counties Manukau	10	0	1	9	130	348	−218	0	0	2

Table notes:
Secured home quarterfinal berth
Secured away quarterfinal berth

- Abbreviations:
  - Pld = games played
  - W = games won
  - D = games drawn
  - L = games lost
  - F = points for
  - A = points against
  - +/− = points difference
  - TB = try bonus points (1 bonus point is awarded to any team that scores 4 tries or more regardless of win/loss/draw)
  - LB = losing bonus points (1 bonus point is awarded to the losing side if the loss is by 7 points or under)
  - Pts = tournament points.
- It is possible to receive 2 bonus points in a loss.
- In the event of a tie on points, the higher ranked team is decided on the basis of who won when they met in pool play. If they remain tied, then it is decided by points differential.

== Fixtures and results ==
Week	Dates
1	26–29 July
2	2–5 August
3	9–12 August
4	16–19 August
5	23–26 August
6	30 August – 2 September
7	6–9 September
8	13–16 September
9	20–23 September
10	27–30 September

=== Week 1 ===
26 July 2007
7:05 NZST

Manawatu	15–41	Waikato

Manawatu Sports Stadium, Palmerston North

27 July 2007
7:35 NZST

Wellington	68–7	Otago

Wellington Regional Stadium, Wellington
Attendance: 11,592

27 July 2007
7:35 NZST

Taranaki	29–17	Tasman

Yarrow Stadium, New Plymouth

28 July 2007
2:35 NZST

Northland	27–27	North Harbour

Okara Park, Whangārei

28 July 2007
5:30 NZST

Auckland	39–5	Counties Manukau

Eden Park, Auckland

28 July 2007
7:35 NZST

Canterbury	34–3	Bay of Plenty

Jade Stadium, Christchurch

29 July 2007
NZST

Southland	13–41	Hawke's Bay

Rugby Park Stadium, Invercargill

=== Week 2 ===
2 August 2007
7:05 NZST

Tasman	33–10	Manawatu

Lansdowne Park, Blenheim

3 August 2007
7:35 NZST

Bay of Plenty	3–41	Auckland

Blue Chip Stadium, Mount Maunganui

3 August 2007
7:35 NZST

Otago	23–20	Northland

Carisbrook, Dunedin

4 August 2007
2:35 NZST

Hawke's Bay	8–6	Wellington

McLean Park, Napier

4 August 2007
5:30 NZST

Waikato	22–11	Southland

Waikato Stadium, Hamilton

4 August 2007
7:35 NZST

North Harbour (RS)	19–13	Taranaki

North Harbour Stadium, Albany

5 August 2007
2:35 NZST

Counties Manukau	13–52	Canterbury

Mount Smart Stadium, Auckland

=== Week 3 ===
9 August 2007
7:05 NZST

Bay of Plenty	17–24	Northland

Rotorua International Stadium, Rotorua
Attendance: 3,500

10 August 2007
7:35 NZST

Counties Manukau	13–13	North Harbour

Mount Smart Stadium, Auckland
Attendance: 2,640

10 August 2007
7:35 NZST

Tasman	23–17	Hawke's Bay

Lansdowne Park, Blenheim
Attendance: 6,000

11 August 2007
2:35 NZST

Wellington	37–7	Manawatu

Wellington Regional Stadium, Wellington
Attendance: 14,081

11 August 2007
5:30 NZST

Auckland	47–26	Waikato

Eden Park, Auckland
Attendance: 13,559

11 August 2007
7:30 NZST

Otago	7–27	Canterbury

Carisbrook, Dunedin
Attendance: 4,500

12 August 2007
2:35 NZST

Taranaki	20–25	Southland

Yarrow Stadium, New Plymouth
Attendance: 5,000

=== Week 4 ===
16 August 2007
7:05 NZST

Northland	9–3	Tasman

Okara Park, Whangārei

17 August 2007
7:35 NZST

Waikato	30–8	Counties Manukau

Waikato Stadium, Hamilton

17 August 2007
7:35 NZST

Hawke's Bay	35–25	North Harbour

McLean Park, Napier

18 August 2007
2:35 NZST

Southland	19–44	Auckland

Rugby Park Stadium, Invercargill

18 August 2007
5:30 NZST

Taranaki	15–18	Otago

Yarrow Stadium, New Plymouth

18 August 2007
7:30 NZST

Canterbury	41–23	Wellington

Lancaster Park, Christchurch

19 August 2007
2:35 NZST

Manawatu	30–18	Bay of Plenty

Manawatu Sports Stadium, Palmerston North

=== Week 5 ===
23 August 2007
7:05 NZST

Counties Manukau	14–38	Hawke's Bay

Mount Smart Stadium, Auckland

24 August 2007
7:35 NZST

Southland	24–16	Northland

Rugby Park Stadium, Invercargill

24 August 2007
7:35 NZST

Auckland	22–13	Taranaki

Eden Park, Auckland

25 August 2007
2:30 NZST

Bay of Plenty	25–29	Otago

Yarrow Stadium, New Plymouth

25 August 2007
5:30 NZST

Wellington	38–25	Tasman

Wellington Regional Stadium, Wellington
Attendance: 11,000

25 August 2007
7:35 NZST

North Harbour (RS)	7–52	Waikato

North Harbour Stadium, Albany

26 August 2007
7:35 NZST

Canterbury	64–10	Manawatu

Lancaster Park, Christchurch

=== Week 6 ===
30 August 2007
7:05 NZST

Hawke's Bay	11–38	Auckland

McLean Park, Napier

31 August 2007
7:35 NZST

Counties Manukau	18–33	Wellington

Mount Smart Stadium, Auckland

31 August 2007
7:35 NZST

Otago	20–26	Southland

Carisbrook, Dunedin

1 September 2007
2:30 NZST

Tasman	26–33	Bay of Plenty

Lansdowne Park, Blenheim

1 September 2007
5:30 NZST

Northland	20–22	Taranaki

Yarrow Stadium, New Plymouth

1 September 2007
7:35 NZST

Waikato (RS)	20–33	Canterbury

Waikato Stadium, Hamilton

2 September 2007
2:35 NZST

North Harbour	34–16	Manawatu

North Harbour Stadium, Albany

=== Week 7 ===
6 September 2007
7:05 NZST

Southland	47–10	Counties Manukau

Rugby Park Stadium, Invercargill

7 September 2007
7:35 NZST

Canterbury (RS)	44–6	Hawke's Bay

Lancaster Park, Christchurch

7 September 2007
7:35 NZST

Taranaki	36–19	Bay of Plenty

Yarrow Stadium, New Plymouth

8 September 2007
2:30 NZST

Tasman	23–25	Waikato

Lansdowne Park, Blenheim

8 September 2007
5:30 NZST

Northland	25–33	Auckland

Okara Park, Whangārei

8 September 2007
7:35 NZST

Wellington	39–14	North Harbour

Wellington Regional Stadium, Wellington
Attendance: 8,300

9 September 2007
2:35 NZST

Manawatu	25–25	Otago

Manawatu Sports Stadium, Palmerston North

=== Week 8 ===
13 September 2007
7:05 NZST

Taranaki	13–20	Canterbury

Yarrow Stadium, New Plymouth
Attendance: 8,000

14 September 2007
7:35 NZST

Waikato	27–41	Wellington

Waikato Stadium, Hamilton
Attendance: 10,000

14 September 2007
7:35 NZST

Hawke's Bay	35–29	Northland

McLean Park, Napier
Attendance: 6,700

15 September 2007
2:30 NZST

Manawatu	31–18	Counties Manukau

Manawatu Sports Stadium, Palmerston North
Attendance: 7,000

15 September 2007
5:30 NZST

Auckland	49–7	Tasman

Eden Park, Auckland
Attendance: 5,500

15 September 2007
7:35 NZST

Otago	31–22	North Harbour

Carisbrook, Dunedin
Attendance: 4,000

16 September 2007
2:35 NZST

Bay of Plenty	0-19	Southland

Blue Chip Stadium, Mount Maunganui
Attendance: 2,000

=== Week 9 ===
20 September 2007
7:05 NZST

Wellington	53–12	Taranaki

Wellington Regional Stadium, Wellington
Attendance: 9,025

21 September 2007
7:35 NZST

Tasman	14–21	Canterbury

Lansdowne Park, Blenheim
Attendance: 6,000

21 September 2007
7:35 NZST

Auckland	32–21	Otago

Eden Park, Auckland
Attendance: 9,289

22 September 2007
2:30 NZST

Southland	30–11	Manawatu

Rugby Park Stadium, Invercargill
Attendance: 6,500

22 September 2007
5:30 NZST

Hawke's Bay	30–26	Waikato

McLean Park, Napier
Attendance: 8,500

22 September 2007
7:35 NZST

North Harbour	42–24	Bay of Plenty

North Harbour Stadium, Albany
Attendance: 2,500

23 September 2007
2:35 NZST

Northland	20–10	Counties Manukau

Okara Park, Whangārei
Attendance: 3,500

=== Week 10 ===
27 September 2007
7:05 NZST

Otago	32–13	Tasman

Carisbrook, Dunedin

28 September 2007
7:35 NZST

North Harbour	19–17	Southland

North Harbour Stadium, Albany

28 September 2007
7:35 NZST

Bay of Plenty	13–16	Wellington

Rotorua International Stadium, Rotorua

29 September 2007
2:30 NZST

Waikato	20–16	Northland

Waikato Stadium, Hamilton

29 September 2007
5:30 NZST

Manawatu	3–31	Hawke's Bay

Manawatu Sports Stadium, Palmerston North

29 September 2007
7:35 NZST

Canterbury (RS)	15–26	Auckland

Lancaster Park, Christchurch

30 September 2007
2:35 NZST

Counties Manukau	21–45	Taranaki

Mount Smart Stadium, Auckland

== Knockout stage ==
Quarter-finals
October 5 – Wellington
Wellington	45
Southland	3
October 6 – Christchurch
Canterbury	44
Otago	6
October 6 – Auckland
Auckland	30
Taranaki	10
October 7 – Napier
Hawke's Bay	38
Waikato	35

Semi-finals
October 13 – Christchurch
Canterbury	21
Wellington	26
October 14 – Auckland
Auckland	38
Hawke's Bay	3

Final
October 20 – Auckland
Auckland	23
Wellington	14

=== Quarterfinals ===
5 October 2007

Wellington	45–3	Southland

Wellington Regional Stadium, Wellington
Referee: 9,277

6 October 2007

Canterbury	44–6	Otago

Lancaster Park, Christchurch

6 October 2007

Auckland	30–10	Taranaki

Eden Park, Auckland

7 October 2007

Hawke's Bay	38–35	Waikato

McLean Park, Napier

=== Semifinals ===
13 October 2007
7:35 NZST

Canterbury	21–26	Wellington

Lancaster Park, Christchurch
Attendance: 17,641

14 October 2007
7:35 NZST

Auckland	38–3	Hawke's Bay

Eden Park, Auckland
Attendance: 9,500

=== Final ===
20 October 2007
7:35 NZST

Auckland	23–14	Wellington
Try: Isa Nacewa; Jay Williams; Con: Isa Nacewa (2); Pen: Isa Nacewa (3)		Try: Jeremy Thrush; Pen: Jimmy Gopperth (3)

Eden Park, Auckland
Attendance: 16,000

== Statistics ==
=== Point scorers ===
Points	Player	Province
155	James Gopperth	Wellington
149	Stephen Brett	Canterbury
122	Matt Berquist	Hawke's Bay
120	Stephen Donald	Waikato
115	Jack McPhee	North Harbour
110	Isa Nacewa	Auckland
101	Brent Ward	Auckland

=== Try scorers ===
Tries	Player	Province
8	Brent Ward	Auckland
7	Shannon Paku	Wellington
6	Jason Shoemark	Hawke's Bay
6	Zac Guildford	Hawke's Bay
6	Shayne Austin	Taranaki
6	Lachie Munro	Auckland
6	Scott Hamilton	Canterbury

== See also ==
- 2007 Heartland Championship
- Air New Zealand Cup
