= Repechage =

Practice amongst ladder competitions

Example of a wrestling tournament using a repechage bracket with two 3rd-place finishers without crossover. Competitors losing to finalists ALFA (bold blue) and VICTOR (bold italic red) compete for bronze medals.

Repechage (/ˌrɛpɪˈʃɑːʒ/ REP-ish-AHZH, UK also /ˈrɛpɪʃɑːʒ/ REP-ish-ahzh; French: repêchage [ʁəpɛʃaʒ], lit. 'fishing out' or 'rescuing') is a practice in series competitions that allows participants who failed to meet qualifying standards by a small margin to continue to the next round. A well-known example is the wild card system.

== Types ==
Different types of repechage can occur. As a basis for the examples below, assume that 64 competitors are divided into four pools of 16 competitors, labeled A, B, C, and D. The first three rounds of the primary championship bracket winnow the field down to eight competitors for the quarter-final.

=== Full repechage ===
In full repechage, a competitor who loses to the pool winner falls into the repechage bracket. The theory is that a worthy competitor who is paired with another worthy competitor should not be unduly penalized by luck of the draw, but have an opportunity to fight for at least third place. In our example, four competitors from each pool (the loser to the pool winner in the first, second, third and quarter-final rounds) fall into the repechage bracket. A larger pool results in a longer wait for first-round losers to determine if they will compete in repechage.

=== Quarter-final repechage ===
Quarter-final repechage pulls losers from the quarter-final round only. The prior rounds are single-elimination. Losers in the quarter-final from two pools (e.g., A and B) are entered into one bracket of the repechage first round. Quarter-final losers from the other two pools are entered into the other bracket. Repechage losers are placed in seventh place. Winners of these matches play against semi-final losers of opposite bracket. Losers are placed in fifth place and winners are awarded with bronze medal each. The Australian Football League (AFL) has a similar mechanism in the AFL final eight system, whereby the top four teams at the end of the home-and-away season are given a second chance in a qualifying final, with the losers of each qualifying final given a second chance in a semi-final, while winners get a bye and compete in a preliminary final. Unlike in other sport variations, the loser from a qualifying final may win the premiership should they win all three finals, including the grand final.

=== Double-elimination repechage ===
In double-elimination repechage, any loser in the championship bracket falls into the repechage bracket. Typically the losers from the championship bracket's first round compete against each other in the repechage first round for the right to compete in the repechage second round (against the championship bracket second round losers). In full double-elimination repechage, the eventual repechage bracket winner competes against the championship bracket winner to determine the winner of the overall competition, but the repechage bracket winner must win two matches to win the competition whereas the championship bracket winner needs only win one match. In a partial double-elimination repechage bracket, the bracket winner (or winners in dual third-place scenario) will take third place.

=== Repechage bracket with two third-place finishers ===
Dual third-place finishers can result with full, quarter-final, or double-elimination repechage. Losers from two championship bracket pools (e.g., A and B) are placed into one repechage bracket and losers from the other two pools are placed in the other repechage bracket. The winner from each pool's repechage bracket competes against the loser in the championship semi-final who comes from one of that repechage bracket's two pools. Alternatively, in a "cross-over" arrangement, the semi-final loser comes from the other bracket's pools. Each winner of this repechage round takes third place. The losers of the prior two repechage rounds are often considered to take fifth and seventh places.

=== Consolation bracket ===
A consolation bracket is when losers fall from the primary championship bracket and compete for third place or a lesser consolation prize. Hence, except in the case of full double-elimination repechage, a repechage bracket might be referred to as a consolation bracket.

== Usage ==
=== Baseball and softball ===
In Major League Baseball (MLB) a repechage bracket is formed by wild card teams in each league.

At many levels of amateur play in baseball and softball, including the National Collegiate Athletic Association (NCAA), tournaments are established as a full double-elimination repechage.

In the current 64-team baseball and softball NCAA tournament formats, there are alternating four-team double-elimination repechage formats, and best two-of-three games series. The first and third rounds are full double-elimination repechages, while the second and fourth rounds are best-two-of-three-game series.

The Southeastern Conference (SEC) baseball tournament has a flip-bracket format; the winner of the first championship bracket plays the winner of the second repechage bracket, and the winner of the second championship bracket plays the winner of the first repechage bracket. Both of those games are single elimination, with the winners playing for the championship.

=== Beach volleyball ===
Some competitions use a modified double elimination format called Olympic Crossing, in which the winning teams compete until two teams remain, while teams with one loss continue in an elimination format until two of them remain. Then, in the semifinals, each of the two remaining winning teams play a team from the losers bracket, and the winners of these matches compete in the final match, while the semifinal losers compete for third place.

=== Cycling ===
In track cycling, repechage heats are used in the keirin and match sprints. These heats give a second chance for non-qualifiers in the preliminary heat(s) to advance to the next round of competition.

=== Fencing ===
Although not normally used for FIE events, sometime local events use direct elimination with repechage. A disadvantage is that some competitors have to wait. An advantage for team events is more willingness to use direct elimination (DE) from the start (with seeding by drawing lots) instead of pools. Example format sheets are here.

Repechage was formerly widely used in fencing tournaments, but the majority have now abandoned it, an exception being United States Fencing Association Division I tournaments.

=== Martial arts ===
In karate, judo, taekwondo, and wrestling tournaments, single-elimination brackets are used to determine the two athletes who will compete in the final for first and second place. The repechage bracket is built from athletes who were knocked out by the finalists and building brackets to determine third place.

Repechage addresses the possibility of two top competitors meeting in an early round, allowing the loser a chance to compete for a bronze medal.

=== Quiz ===
In University Challenge, 28 teams compete in each season. Of the fourteen teams who lose in the first round, the four teams with the highest scores compete in the Highest Scoring Losers Play-Offs, with the two winners advancing to the second round.

=== Rowing ===
In rowing, often only the first one or two boats in a race will qualify automatically for the next round, and the other boats race again in one or more repechage to qualify. Conditions such as wind vary between the heats, often significantly affecting a competitor's time, and the repechage system allows the "fastest losers" to qualify irrespective of the variable conditions in the opening heats.

=== Rugby ===
In rugby, the qualification processes for the Rugby World Cup and the Rugby League World Cup use a repechage system. The Air New Zealand Cup, New Zealand's domestic professional competition in Union, used the repechage in the 2006 Air New Zealand Cup, but scrapped it for the 2007 Air New Zealand Cup.

=== Sailing ===
A repechage stage in sailing is sometimes used in match-racing competition to allow teams finishing the round robin(s) just below the top-level teams a chance to advance to the quarter-final stage. This is standard competition for the Olympic-class events, such as the ISAF Sailing World Cup.

=== Track and field athletics ===
In field athletics, automatic qualification for the next round depends on meeting or surpassing a specified minimum result. The remaining qualification spots (if any) are given in order to the best results.

In track athletics, automatic qualification for the next round is given to the best competitors in each heat. Other competitors with the best times may qualify for the next round indirectly as "fastest losers" as a result of the repechage. If a particular heat was significantly faster than the others, repechage spots can all be taken by athletes from that heat.

== Alternatives ==
Alternatives to repechage include single-elimination, round-robin, wild card and the Swiss system.

== See also ==
- List of French words and phrases used by English speakers
