= Craig McGrath =

Craig McGrath may refer to:

- Craig McGrath (Australian footballer) (born 1963), Australian rules footballer
- Craig McGrath (rugby union) (born 1974), New Zealand rugby union player
