= Peter Mirrielees =

- Born: 5 February 1983 (age 43) Invercargill, New Zealand
- Height: 1.80 m (5 ft 11 in)
- Weight: 106 kg (16 st 10 lb)

Rugby union career
- Position: Hooker
Amateur team(s)
| Years | Team | Apps | (Points) |
| 2004 -2015 | Harbour RFC | | |
Provincial / State sides
| Years | Team | Apps | (Points) |
| 2005-2010 | Otago | 43 | (0) |

Peter Mirrielees (born 5 February 1983 in Invercargill, New Zealand) is a rugby union player who represented Otago in the ITM Cup.

== Playing career ==
Peter Merrielees played Harbour in the Dunedin Premier Rugby Competition in which he was captain for over 150 matches. Merrielees started his career with Dunedin in 2003 but with Jason Macdonald also in the side, Mirrielees transferred to Harbour the following season.

Mirrielees made his debut for Otago in 2005, but didn't become a regular for the side until the 2007 Air New Zealand Cup when he made 5 starts over the course of the season.

For the 2010 Super 14 season, Mirrielees was included in the wider training group of the Highlanders. Mirrielees was called into the main squad and included in the matchday 22 for the final 4 matches of the season.

Mirrielees became Otago's starting hooker for the 2010 ITM Cup. He started 9 matches for the province over the course of the season. After retirement Peter Mirrielees started Let's Go Fitness in Dunedin.

== Assault ==
In 2015 Mirrielees was convicted of assaulting a woman in Dunedin bar while heavily intoxicated.
