= Josh Levi =

Josh Levi may refer to:

- Josh Levi (rugby union)
- Josh Levi (singer)
