= Campbell Feather =

New Zealand rugby union player (born 1975)

- Full name: Campbell Lance Feather
- Born: 2 October 1975 (age 51)
- Notable relative: Todd Feather (brother)

Rugby union career
- Position: Loose forward
Senior career
Years	Team	Apps	(Points)
2002–04	Border Reivers		
Provincial / State sides
Years	Team	Apps	(Points)
1998–01	Taranaki	50	(47)
2004–06	Ulster	29	(15)
Super Rugby
Years	Team	Apps	(Points)
1999–02	Hurricanes	31	(0)

Campbell Lance Feather (born 2 October 1975) is a New Zealand former professional rugby union player.

Raised on a dairy farm, Feather was educated at New Plymouth Boys' High School and played on the team that won the inaugural edition of the secondary schools World Cup in 1992.

Feather competed as a number eight for Taranaki but often played as a blindside flanker during his time at the Hurricanes in the Super 12. He joined Borders in 2002 and played at the Scottish club for two seasons, then left in 2005 for Ulster, which he captained in his first season following an injury to Andy Ward.
