= Jamie Nutbrown =

- Born: Jamie Ronald Nutbrown; 4 July 1981 (age 45) Christchurch, New Zealand
- Height: 1.81 m (5 ft 11 in)
- Weight: 95 kg (14 st 13 lb)
- School: St Bede's College

Rugby union career
- Position: Halfback/Scrum-half
Amateur team(s)
| Years | Team | Apps | (Points) |
| 1986–2005 | Belfast (Cobras) | | |
Senior career
| Years | Team | Apps | (Points) |
| 2008–11 | Ospreys | 50 | (20) |
- Correct as of 18:15, 11 July 2011 (UTC)
Provincial / State sides
| Years | Team | Apps | (Points) |
| 2003–05 | Canterbury | 23 | (10) |
| 2006–08, 2011–2013 | Bay of Plenty | 45 | (30) |
- Correct as of 22 August 2013
Super Rugby
| Years | Team | Apps | (Points) |
| 2004–06 | Crusaders | 15 | (5) |
| 2006–08 | Chiefs | 22 | (5) |
- Correct as of 22 August 2013
International career
| Years | Team | Apps | (Points) |
- Junior ABs
- Correct as of 12:55, 11 May 2008 (UTC)

Jamie Ronald Nutbrown (born 1981 in Christchurch, New Zealand), is a former first-class New Zealand rugby union player and referee.

== Rugby playing career ==
Educated at St Bede's College in Christchurch, Nutbrown played as a Half-back/Scrum Half.

He started his rugby career for Belfast Rugby Club in 1986 at the age of five. He played for the New Zealand national under-19 rugby union team in 2000 and the New Zealand Colts in 2001 and 2002.

Nutbrown played for Canterbury in the Air New Zealand Cup from 2003 to 2005, before moving to Bay of Plenty in a swap with Kevin Senio. He became one of Bay of Plenty's top players alongside New Zealand sevens representatives Solomon King, Nigel Hunt and Zar Lawrence. Nutbrown was selected for an All Black trial in 2005 and in 2006 played for the Junior All Blacks in the Pacific Nations Cup.

In 2006, he was selected to play for the Chiefs until 2007 and became their second choice Half-back behind All Black Byron Kelleher. When Kelleher left for Europe, Nutbrown was set to become the Chiefs first choice Half-back, but an injury forced him to miss 2007 and the spot was filled by future All Black Brendon Leonard.

Following former All Black Justin Marshall's departure to Montpellier Hérault RC, Ospreys needed a backup to Mike Phillips. In August 2008 halfway through the Air New Zealand Cup, Nutbrown left Bay of Plenty for Ospreys. After Phillips suffered an early season knee ligament injury, Nutbrown developed, until Phillips returned from injury in late 2008.

In May 2011 Nutbrown was released by Ospreys and returned to New Zealand signing a three-year deal with the Steamers. Nutbrown was named in the Chiefs 'A' Development Squad 2012 which played matches against Samoan and Fijian 'A' teams Nutbrown was bracketed on the bench for the Hurricanes in their final round robin game versus the Chiefs in Super Rugby on 13 July 2012.

== Rugby referee career ==
In 2014 Nutbrown commenced refereeing in Canterbury. He rose through the ranks and refereed Super Rugby for four years, He had also officiated at the World Rugby Under 20 Championships in Georgia in 2017 and France in 2018. He stated a highlight of his career was officiating at the first ever Super Rugby game in Argentina. He was excluded from the Super rugby referee team for the 2019 season. He then retired from professional refereeing.

Following his first class career he continued to referee at club rugby level, coaching his son's rugby team and operate a business as an electrician.
