= Tony Koonwaiyou =

- Born: Tony Koonwaiyou; 10 June 1983 (age 43) Samoa
- Height: 1.84 m (6 ft 0 in)
- Weight: 104 kg (16 st 5 lb)
- School: Mount Roskill Grammar School, Kings College
- Occupation: Professional rugby union player

Rugby union career
- Position(s): Wing, Centre, Fullback
Amateur team(s)
| Years | Team | Apps | (Points) |
- Star Rugby Club
Provincial / State sides
| Years | Team | Apps | (Points) |
| 2003–2005 | Auckland | | |
| 2006–2007 | Northland | | |
| 2008- | Southland | | |
Super Rugby
| Years | Team | Apps | (Points) |
| 2004–2006 | Crusaders | 7 | (0) |

Tony Koonwaiyou (born 10 June 1983 in Samoa) is a rugby union footballer who plays at wing, centre and fullback for the Southland Stags in the Air New Zealand Cup. He attended Mt Roskill Grammar and Kings College in Auckland, New Zealand.

== Rugby career ==
After a great season in the 2003 NPC for Auckland he was drafted by the Crusaders for the 2004 Super 12. His debut was against the New South Wales Waratahs and went on to play 7 games that season. In 2004 the Koonwaiyou was contracted to play for the Blues but a severe injury halted his rugby future. In 2008 Koonwaiyou signed with Southland but another injury sidelined him for the whole 2008 Air New Zealand Cup. Koonwaiyou finally made his debut off the bench on 1 August 2009 in the Stags 16–6 win over Waikato.
