= Tony Coughlan =

- Full name: Anthony Robert Coughlan
- Born: 3 April 1975 (age 51)
- Height: 186 cm (6 ft 1 in)
- Weight: 109 kg (240 lb)

Rugby union career
- Position: Prop
Provincial / State sides
Years	Team	Apps	(Points)
1997–00	North Harbour	44	(5)
2001–03	Wellington	11	(5)
2004–05	North Harbour	20	(5)
2006–08	Northland	29	(15)
Super Rugby
Years	Team	Apps	(Points)
1999	Blues	6	(0)
2000–02	Hurricanes	16	(10)

Anthony Robert Coughlan (born 3 April 1975) is a New Zealand former professional rugby union player.

A prop, Coughlan competed for the Blues in the 1999 Super 12 season, then the Hurricanes between 2000 and 2002, mostly off the bench. He returned to his original province North Harbour after his Super 12 days. In 2005–06, Coughlan spent a season in England with Yorkshire club Ilkley. He finished his career with three seasons at Northland.
