= Sam Harding (rugby union) =

Australian rugby union player (born 1980)

- Born: Samuel Harding; 1 December 1980 (age 45) Subiaco, Australia
- Height: 1.84 m (6 ft 0 in)
- Weight: 104 kg (229 lb)
- Notable relative: Tom Harding (brother)

Rugby union career
- Position: Flanker
Senior career
Years	Team	Apps	(Points)
2004–2005	Crusaders		
2005–2007	Northampton		
International career
Years	Team	Apps	(Points)
2002	New Zealand	1	(0)

Samuel Harding (born 1 December 1980) is a rugby union footballer who plays at flanker. He was born in Subiaco.

In 2002, Harding won a cap with the New Zealand national rugby union team against Fiji.

Between 2002 and 2004, Harding played for the Highlanders and spent the following season with the Crusaders where he won his first Super 12 competition. In September 2005, he moved to Northampton Saints and then onto Ulster. He commenced his retirement from the game in 2007 with a one-year stint in Italy at Rugby Viadana and then played his final season in Seville, Spain.

Sam Harding has a younger sister, Polly Harding from KIIS 1011 breakfast radio show http://www.jaseandpj.com.au
