= Jason Shoemark =

NZ rugby union player

- Born: Jason Shoemark; 5 February 1980 (age 46) Whangārei, New Zealand
- Height: 1.83 m (6 ft 0 in)
- Weight: 112 kg (17 st 9 lb)

Rugby union career
- Position: Centre
Senior career
Years	Team	Apps	(Points)
1999–2003	Northland	37	(25)
2002–2003	Blues	6	(5)
2004–2005	Otago	14	(10)
2005	Highlanders	5	(0)
2006–2010	Hawke’s Bay	54	(95)
2009–2010	Highlanders	25	(15)
2010–2014	Exeter Chiefs	75	(20)
2014	Hawke’s Bay	10	(0)
1999–20114	Total	226	(170)

Jason Shoemark (born 5 February 1981) is a professional rugby union player who last played as a centre for the Hawke's Bay in the ITM Cup.

== Playing career ==
=== New Zealand ===
Shoemark made his provincial debut for Northland while still a teenager and quickly made a name for himself, emerging as a key player for the Taniwha. By 2002, he received a Super Rugby contract with the Blues, making 5 appearances and scoring a try. However, his opportunities were more limited with the Blues in 2003, as he was limited to just a single substitute appearance.

Looking to jumpstart his career, Shoemark moved south in 2004 to join Otago and the Highlanders. However, he never really hit form with Otago in two seasons with the province, and while he was included in the Highlanders squad for the 2005 Super 12 season, he made only 5 substitute appearances.

Shoemark moved back north in 2006, signing with Hawke's Bay, but was ruled out of the 2006 Air New Zealand Cup after suffering a serious neck injury. Back healthy the following year, Shoemark finally began to realize his potential, scoring 6 tries from 12 starts for the Magpies in the 2007 Air New Zealand Cup. After another stellar season in 2008 during which he scoring another 6 tries, he was called back into the Highlanders squad.

Shoemark's second stint with the Highlanders proved much more fruitful than the first, as he earned a starting spot with the club and played some of the finest rugby of his career. He started all 13 matches, scored 3 tries, and earned a call-up to the All Blacks later in the year. In 2010, Shoemark wasn't able to maintain the level of form from the previous season, although he remained a reliable regular starter. He also served as a fill-in captain and also vice-captain.

Now serving as team captain, Shoemark continued his strong play for Hawke's Bay in the 2010 ITM Cup, and celebrated his 50th appearance for the club with a try in a win over Taranaki on 25 September.

Shoemark returned to Hawke's Bay for the 2014 ITM Cup, making 10 appearances for the Magpies.

=== Exeter Chiefs ===
On 15 July 2010 it was announced that he would be joining newly promoted Exeter Chiefs of the Aviva Premiership at the end of the ITM Cup campaign. Shoemark made 16 appearances for the Chiefs in his first season with the club, scoring one try.

After four seasons with Exeter, Shoemark returned to New Zealand following the 2013-14 campaign.

=== International career ===
In 2009 Shoemark was a late inclusion on the All Blacks European Tour, after Tamati Ellison was ruled out with ligament damage. However, he remains a 'nearly' All Black as he never took the field in a game.

=== Family ===
Jason Shoemark is married to wife Vanessa and has 4 kids, Jessica, Maddie, Hunter, and Olive Goodall.
