= Koiatu Koiatu =

Cook Islands international rugby union player

- Born: 26 November 1977 (age 48) Cook Islands
- Height: 1.8 m (5 ft 11 in)
- Weight: 83 kg (183 lb)

Rugby union career
Provincial / State sides
| Years | Team | Apps | (Points) |
| 2004-06, 2008 | Counties Manukau | 28 | (92) |
International career
| Years | Team | Apps | (Points) |
- Cook Islands
National sevens team
| Years | Team | | Comps |
- Cook Islands

Koiatu Koiatu (born Cook Islands, 26 November 1977) is a Cook Islands rugby union footballer. He plays as a fullback and as wing.

== Career ==
Koiatu currently plays for Bombay and for Counties Manukau, in New Zealand. He is an international player for Cook Islands, both at XV and Sevens. He played at the IRB Sevens World Series, in 2006 and 2008.

Koiatu now lives in Perth Western Australia where he plays and coaches at Wanneroo Districts Rugby Union Club, historically and currently Perth's premier club.
