= Isa Nacewa =

Fiji international rugby union player

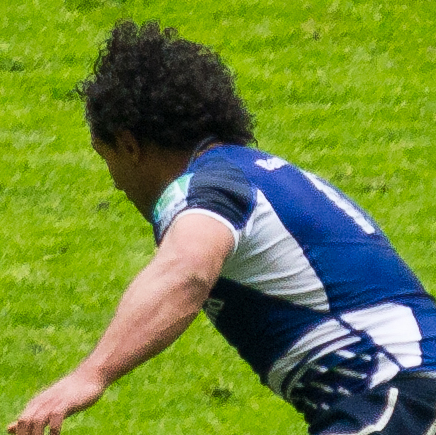
- Nacewa in 2012
- Born: Isikeli Kurimavua Nacewa; 22 July 1982 (age 44) Auckland, New Zealand
- Height: 1.80 m (5 ft 11 in)
- Weight: 91 kg (14 st 5 lb)
- School: Auckland Grammar School

Rugby union career
- Position: Utility Back
Provincial / State sides
Years	Team	Apps	(Points)
2003–2007	Auckland	54	(212)
2008–2013, 2015–2018	Leinster	185	(706)
- Correct as of 29 June 2021
Super Rugby
Years	Team	Apps	(Points)
2005–2008	Blues	44	(208)
- Correct as of 16 May 2008
International career
Years	Team	Apps	(Points)
2003	Fiji	1	(0)
- Correct as of 2 June 2012

Isakeli "Isa" Nacewa (born 22 July 1982) is a former rugby union player and coach. Born in New Zealand of Fijian descent, he represented the Fiji national team, winning one cap in 2003.

Nacewa was a utility back who played for the Blues in the Super Rugby competition and Auckland in the Air New Zealand Cup.

Nacewa moved to Leinster in 2008, and over two spells won four European Cups, and captained the team to European Champions Cup and Pro14 titles in his final season. He retired from playing at the end of the 2017–2018 season.

He took a two-year break from playing from 2013 to 2015, when he returned to New Zealand and had a coaching role with the Blues.

== Career ==
=== New Zealand ===
Nacewa was a member of the Auckland squad that won the 2005 National Provincial Championship (NPC). He has played in multiple positions, including outside back and centre. During the 2006 Super 14 season, he also played at first five-eighth, filling in for the injured Luke McAlister.

In the 2007 Super 14 coach David Nucifora trialled him in their first match against the Crusaders at Fly-half in place of first-choice Luke McAlister who was out because of an injury. Nacewa played so well that Nucifora decided to play him at number 10 and when McAlister returned he was placed in his favourite position at inside centre to cater for Nacewa. The Blues defeated the defending champions and Nacewa scored 19 points. In the 2007 Air New Zealand Cup, Nacewa was voted the player of the tournament after guiding his Auckland team to another thrilling victory and thus winning the coveted Air New Zealand Cup in another thriller defeating finalist Wellington. He has won the Air New Zealand Cup 3 times with Auckland in 2003, 2005, and 2007.

==== International career ====
Born and raised in New Zealand, Nacewa qualified to play for Fiji through his ancestral links. He was included in Fiji's squad for the 2003 Rugby World Cup and came on as a substitute against Scotland for less than 3 minutes, not touching the ball. In 2006, he quit the Fiji national team as he wanted his eligibility changed from Fiji to New Zealand. But due to IRB law, his appearance for Fiji in the World Cup made him ineligible for the All Blacks, Nacewa considered legal advice to persuade the IRB to annul his Fiji cap, however the IRB has since ruled that Nacewa is a Fijian citizen and has played for Fiji during the 2003 Rugby World Cup, making him eligible to play only for Fiji. According to media reports in October 2009, Nacewa was sounded out about the possibility of again playing for Fiji on their tour to Europe, but he rebuffed these approaches to retain his focus on club rugby with Leinster. Nacewa could have qualified for Ireland (under residency), had he not already played for Fiji.

=== Leinster ===
In 2008, Nacewa moved to Ireland to represent Leinster Rugby, scoring a try in his opening game for the province. However, he suffered a setback when he sustained a broken arm in the win over the Ospreys on 19 September, a game in which he scored two drop goals.

Nacewa returned for the later stages of the Heineken Cup pool stages and played on the right wing in the quarter-final victory over Harlequins but moved to full-back for the semi-final against Munster with great success. The Irish Times said of his performance "Nacewa's selection at fullback was vindicated for his stunning line and pass for D’Arcy's opening try. But there was so much more than that as well: his security and strength at the back, his counter-attacking runs, his passing and kicking". He retained his place at full-back for the Heineken Cup final on 23 May 2009, keeping Ireland first-choice and Lions tourist Rob Kearney on the bench, and contributed well to Leinster's 19–16 victory.

In the 2009/2010 season, Nacewa alternated between full-back and wing but was almost ever-present in the starting Leinster XV. Rumours circulated that Nacewa was contemplating a return to the Fijian national team when they toured Ireland and Britain in November 2009; however Nacewa himself rejected this.

In the 2010/2011 season, Nacewa established himself as one of the finest full-backs in Europe with eye-catching displays for Leinster in their Heineken Cup run, scoring two tries in the pool stages as well as a brilliant solo effort in the quarter-final against Leicester. Following that game, his Leinster colleague, Gordon D'Arcy said of Nacewa; "It gets kind of boring when he's that good. He's probably one of the best players I’ve played with in any shape, way or form." Nacewa picked up his second Heineken Cup winners medal after playing a key role in Leinster's second-half comeback against Northampton at the Millennium Stadium, Cardiff.

On an individual level, Nacewa was named both the Irish Rugby Union Players' Association (IRUPA) and the Leinster Rugby Player of the Year, as well as being chosen as full-back on the 'Magners League Dream Team' for 2011 and was shortlisted for the ERC European Player of the Year, losing out to his Leinster colleague, Seán O'Brien.

He was included for the Barbarians' match against Wales starting at fullback. He scored 2 tries, one of which came in the final minute to give the Barbarians a win. Following that game, speculation arose that Nacewa would play for Fiji at the 2011 World Cup, however it was later confirmed by the Fiji rugby union that he would not make himself available, citing family commitments .

Doubts were raised about his future at Leinster after the IRFU announced a new policy restricting non-Irish players in December 2011. However, in April 2012, it was announced that Nacewa had signed an extension to his contract which will see him remain with Leinster until the end of the 2013/14 season. Nacewa ended the 2011/12 season with his third Heineken Cup winners medal after featuring on the wing for most of the campaign. He gained the distinction of not only playing every match but also every minute of the campaign. The season ended on a disappointing note as Leinster lost out in the RaboDirect Pro12 Grand Final to the Ospreys on 27 May, despite two tries by Nacewa.

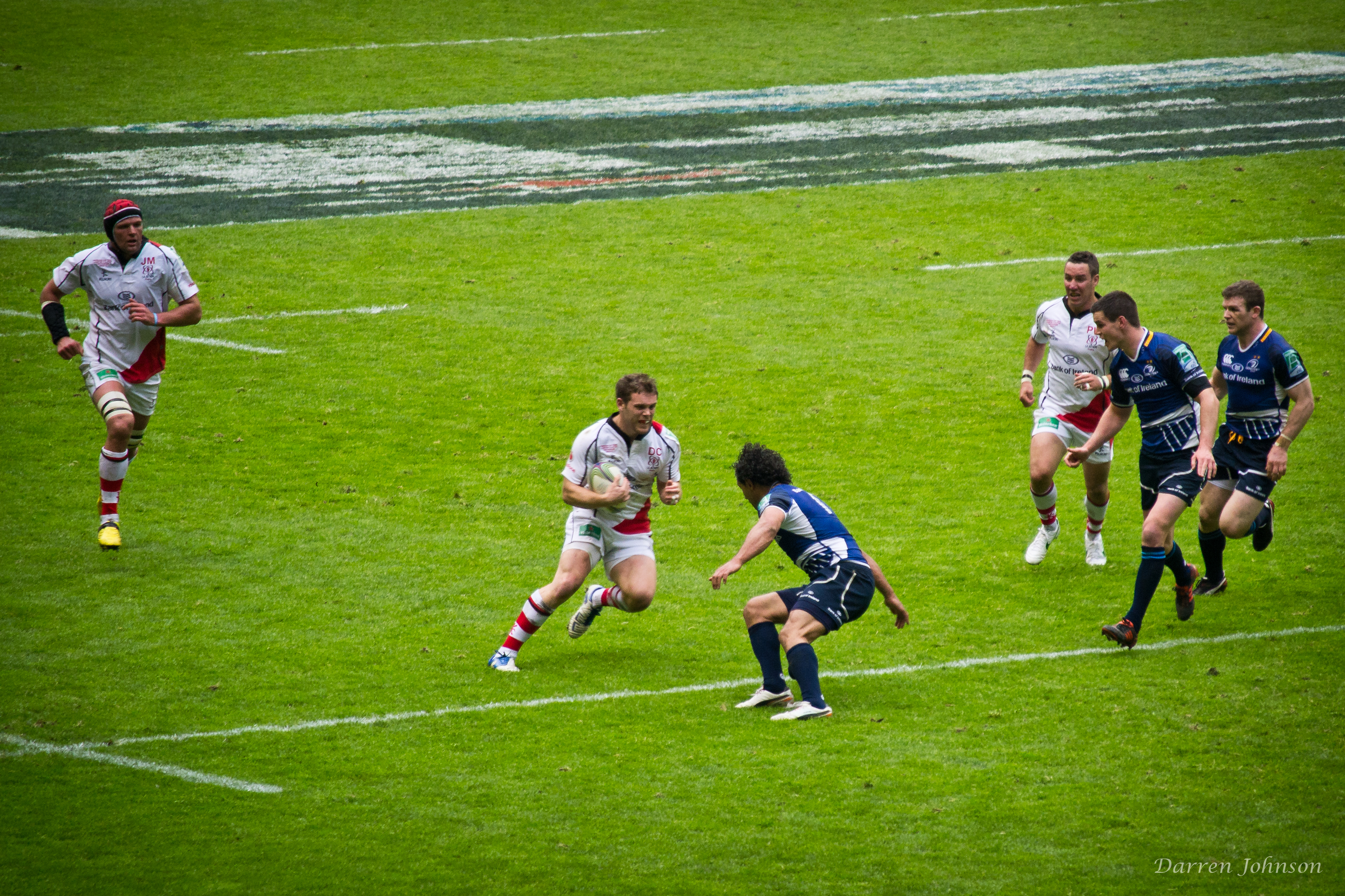
Nacewa goes into a tackle in the 2012 Heineken Cup Final

=== Retirement ===
On 20 March 2013, it was reported in the Irish Times that Nacewa would finish his career and return to New Zealand at the end of the 2012–2013 season, despite having a year left on his contract. Family reasons were cited as being behind his decision. This was confirmed on the Leinster Rugby website later that day. Nacewa played his last game on 25 May 2013 at full-back in the 24–18 win over Ulster in the RaboDirect Pro12 final against Ulster at the RDS, collecting the fifth trophy of his Leinster career in the process.

After retirement, Nacewa joined the NZ ITM Cup commentating team for Sky NZ.

=== Coaching ===
In November 2013, it was announced that Nacewa would be returning to the Auckland Blues as mental skills coach for the 2014 Super Rugby season. Nacewa said at the time "My role involves getting the players' mental space right going into trainings and games and upskilling them on the discipline and attributes needed to be winners, not just talented players".

=== Return to Leinster Rugby ===
In April 2015, Nacewa signed a one-year contract to play for Leinster. He made his return for Leinster against Edinburgh Rugby in the 2015-16 Pro 12 season kicking 9 points. The following week, he was the stand-in captain and he kicked 13 points to help Leinster beat Cardiff Blues. He played at fullback in both games. Nacewa extended his contract and was installed as the Leinster Captain for the 2015/16 season. Nacewa was named captain of the Pro 12 team of the season as he led Leinster to the top of Pro 12 table and the final at Murrayfield where they were defeated by Connacht Rugby 20–10.

In September 2017, Nacewa and teammate Jamison Gibson-Park were denied entry to South Africa due to newly created restrictions that required citizens of New Zealand to obtain a visa. The pair had been due to play two matches for Leinster in the Pro14 against the Southern Kings and the Cheetahs.

On 24 April 2018, it was announced that Nacewa would be retiring at the end of the 2017/2018 season and would be returning to New Zealand.

On 12 May 2018, Nacewa kicked the match-winning penalty in Leinster's 15–12 defeat of Racing 92, in the European Rugby Champions Cup final, gaining a record-equalling fourth win as a player in the competition.

== Honours ==
=== Club ===
==== Leinster ====
- European Rugby Champions Cup/Heineken Cup (4): 2008/09, 2010/11, 2011/12, 2017/18
- Amlin Challenge Cup: 2012/13
- Pro12/Pro14 (2) : 2012/13, 2017/18

==== Auckland ====
- Air New Zealand Cup: 2003, 2005, 2007

=== Individual ===
- IRUPA Player of the Year: 2011
- Leinster Rugby Player of the Year: 2011
