= Niva Ta'auso =

Niva Ta’auso
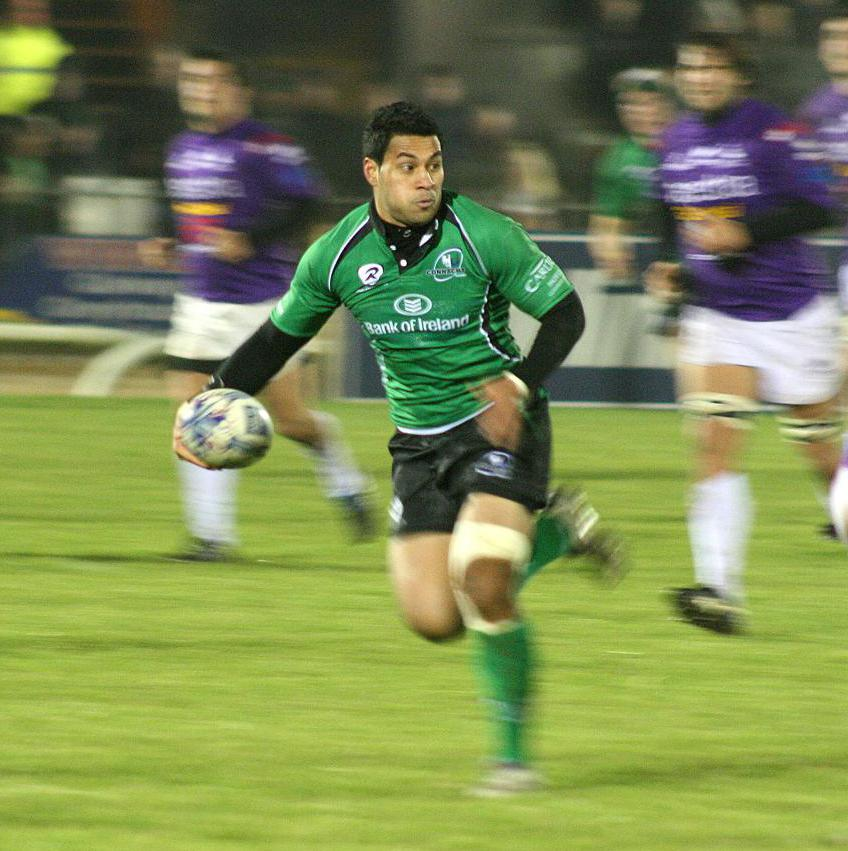
- Ta'auso playing for Connacht
- Born: Mnuininiva Ta'auso; 15 April 1980 (age 46) Apia, Samoa
- Height: 1.85 m (6 ft 1 in)
- Weight: 97 kg (15 st 4 lb)
- School: St Joseph's College, Samoa

Rugby union career
- Position: Centre
Amateur team(s)
Years	Team	Apps	(Points)
2001–04, 2012–15	Pukekohe		
Senior career
Years	Team	Apps	(Points)
2008–2011	Connacht	49	(45)
Provincial / State sides
Years	Team	Apps	(Points)
2001–08, 2011–12	Counties Manukau	63	(105)
2012–13	Havelock Sports Club		
Super Rugby
Years	Team	Apps	(Points)
2005–07	Chiefs	16	(25)
2008	Highlanders	9	(0)

Niva Ta'auso is a former Samoan-born New Zealand rugby union player. His position was Centre. He notably played for Counties-Manukau in the National Provincial Championship as well as for Connacht in the Pro12.

He last played for the Pukekohe club where he made his 100th appearance in 2015.

Ta'auso debuted for the Chiefs in the Super 14 in 2005 against the Sharks. In three seasons Ta'auso had played 16 matches and scored 25 points. In 2008 he was drafted into the Highlanders squad.

Ta'auso played for Counties-Manukau in the National Provincial Championship. He debuted against Argentina in 2001 and returned there in 2011 after departing Connacht.

== New Zealand Representative Teams ==
- New Zealand Divisional XV – 2004
- Junior All Blacks – 2006

== Connacht ==
Connacht announced on their official website on 14 July 2008 that they signed Ta'auso for the Celtic League season 2008–09. He remained there until the end of the 2010–2011 season.
