= Todd Feather =

- Full name: Todd Robert Feather
- Born: 19 September 1977 (age 49) Reporoa, New Zealand
- Notable relative: Campbell Feather (brother)

Rugby union career
- Position: Fly-half
Provincial / State sides
Years	Team	Apps	(Points)
2005	Taranaki	7	(24)
Super Rugby
Years	Team	Apps	(Points)
2004	Reds	3	(10)

Todd Robert Feather (born 19 September 1977) is a New Zealand former professional rugby union player.

Feather grew up in Reporoa, a small community between Rotorua and Taupo. He is the younger brother of Hurricanes forward Campbell Feather and was educated at New Plymouth Boys' High School.

After training as an engineer, Feather picked up work in Perth and made the Western Australia state side for a match against the 2001 British Lions. His four years in the city culminated in a starring role at fly-half for Perth Gold in their 2003 Australian Rugby Shield premiership win, which helped secure him a contract with the Queensland Reds.

Feather played three of the first round rounds of the 2004 Super 12 season with the Reds before a broken foot ended his campaign. He competed for French club Bayonne in the 2004–05 Top 16 season. In 2005, Feather returned home and made a belated debut in New Zealand top-level rugby with Taranaki at 27-years of age.

Feather went on to establish Sunrise Berries in 2014.
