= Tom Harding =

- Full name: Thomas Harding
- Born: 3 May 1982 (age 44) Nelson, New Zealand
- Height: 6 ft 0 in (183 cm)
- Weight: 213 lb (97 kg)
- School: Christ's College
- Notable relative: Sam Harding (brother)

Rugby union career
- Position: Flanker
Senior career
Years	Team	Apps	(Points)
2005–07	Worcester Warriors	39	(?)
Provincial / State sides
Years	Team	Apps	(Points)
2002–04	Otago	9	(5)
2005	North Harbour	12	(30)
2007	Wellington	10	(10)
2008	Waikato	11	(15)
Super Rugby
Years	Team	Apps	(Points)
2008	Chiefs	3	(0)

Thomas Harding (born 3 May 1982) is a New Zealand former professional rugby union player.

== Biography ==
Born in Nelson, Harding is the younger brother of All Black Sam Harding and attended Christ's College, where he played both cricket and rugby. He made headlines in 1999 when he took four wickets from four consecutive balls in a first XI match against Otago Boys' High School. A flanker, Harding was a NZ Under-19s and NZ Colts representative player.

Harding got his start in provincial rugby at Otago and played there for three years before moving on to North Harbour seeking better opportunities. He had two seasons in the top-tier of English rugby with the Worcester Warriors. On his return home, Harding was signed by Wellington in 2007 and the following year got drafted into the Chiefs team, making three Super 14 appearances. He finished his career with a stint at Japanese club Kobe Steelers.
