= Wayne Ormond (rugby union) =

New Zealand rugby union player (born 1977)

- Full name: Wayne Wilson Ormond
- Born: 9 August 1977 (age 49) Tokoroa, New Zealand
- Height: 6 ft 3 in (191 cm)
- Weight: 235 lb (107 kg)

Rugby union career
- Position: Lock / Flanker
Provincial / State sides
Years	Team	Apps	(Points)
1999–05	Bay of Plenty	65	(55)
2011	King Country	1	(0)
Super Rugby
Years	Team	Apps	(Points)
2003–05	Chiefs	25	(0)

Wayne Wilson Ormond (born 9 August 1977) is a New Zealand former professional rugby union player.

== Biography ==
Ormond comes from the small community of Tihoi, near Taupō in Waikato.

A blindside flanker and lock, Ormond is best remembered for being captain of the first Bay of Plenty team to claim the Ranfurly Shield, with a 33–28 upset over Auckland in 2004. He was named the NPC's most valuable player for 2004 and got nominated for that year's Halberg Awards. The All Black selectors however overlooked Ormond for the 2004 end-of-year rugby union internationals, in favour of Jerry Collins and an uncapped Jerome Kaino.

Ormond competed with the Chiefs from 2003 to 2005 and won four caps for New Zealand Maori. He headed overseas to Japan in 2006 and spent five seasons with Fukuoka club Coca-Cola Red Sparks. On his return to New Zealand, Ormond made a solitary appearance for King Country, having moved back to his family farm in Tihoi.
