= Grant McQuoid =

- Full name: Grant Antony McQuoid
- Born: 30 July 1979 (age 47)
- Height: 186 cm (6 ft 1 in)
- Weight: 95 kg (209 lb)
- School: Matamata College

Rugby union career
- Position: Centre / Wing / Fullback
Provincial / State sides
Years	Team	Apps	(Points)
1998–01	Waikato	18	(20)
2002–05, 2010	Bay of Plenty	50	(65)
Super Rugby
Years	Team	Apps	(Points)
2004–05	Chiefs	8	(0)

Grant Antony McQuoid (born 30 July 1979) is a New Zealand former professional rugby union player.

A Matamata College product, McQuoid was a NZ Colts representative player, featuring in the same backline as future All Blacks Rico Gear, Doug Howlett and Nathan Mauger.

McQuoid debuted for Waikato at the age of 19 in their successful 1998 Ranfurly Shield defence against the Bay of Plenty, before crossing over to the Steamers in 2002. He scored four tries during the Bay of Plenty's historic 2004 Ranfurly Shield-winning season. After two seasons with the Chiefs in 2004 and 2005, McQuoid plied his trade in Japanese professional rugby, competing with Yamaha Júbilo. He had one more campaign at the Bay of Plenty on his return to New Zealand and brought up 50 provincial appearances.
