= Simms Davison =

New Zealand rugby union player (born 1979)

- Full name: Simms Harry Ralph Davison
- Born: 27 June 1979 (age 47) Matamata, New Zealand
- Height: 185 cm (6 ft 1 in)
- Weight: 112 kg (247 lb)
- University: University of Otago

Rugby union career
- Position: Prop
Provincial / State sides
| Years | Team | Apps | (Points) |
| 2002–07 | Bay of Plenty | 63 | (25) |
Super Rugby
| Years | Team | Apps | (Points) |
| 2004–08 | Chiefs | 52 | (10) |

Simms Harry Ralph Davison (born 27 June 1979) is a New Zealand former professional rugby union player.

Davison was born in Matamata, Waikato. He earned New Zealand Universities representative honours while a commerce student at the University of Otago and was an Otago development player.

A powerful loose-head prop, Davison played his provincial rugby with Bay of Plenty and was a member of the Chiefs from 2004 and 2008, making 52 appearances. He finished his career with a season at French club ASM Clermont Auvergne, competing in the 2008–09 Heineken Cup and Top 14 competitions.

Davison took ownership of his family's Matamata horse stud farm "Mapperley Stud" in 2016. He bred 2023 Auckland Thoroughbred Breeders' Stakes winner Campionessa.
