= Pehi Te Whare =

- Born: Pehitia Te Whare; 6 February 1984 (age 42) Te Kūiti, New Zealand
- Height: 1.85 m (6 ft 1 in)
- Weight: 96 kg (15 st 2 lb)
- School: Te Kuiti High School
- Occupation: Bricklayer

Rugby union career
- Position(s): Wing, Fullback
Amateur team(s)
Years	Team	Apps	(Points)
- Invercargill Blues Rugby Club
Provincial / State sides
Years	Team	Apps	(Points)
2005–09	Southland	55	
International career
Years	Team	Apps	(Points)
- New Zealand Maori

Pehitia "Pehi" Te Whare (born 6 February 1984) is a former New Zealand rugby union player. He notably played for the Southland Stags in the National Provincial Championship. He mainly played the wing position. He is also a former New Zealand Māori representative, where he played in the Churchill Cup.
