= Anthony Tahana =

- Full name: Anthony Steven Tahana
- Born: 9 December 1977 (age 48) Ōtāhuhu, New Zealand
- Height: 5 ft 10 in (178 cm)
- Weight: 209 lb (95 kg)

Rugby union career
- Position: Wing
Provincial / State sides
Years	Team	Apps	(Points)
1996–07	Bay of Plenty	71	(155)
Super Rugby
Years	Team	Apps	(Points)
2006–07	Chiefs	8	(10)

Anthony Steven Tahana (born 9 December 1977) is a New Zealand former professional rugby union player.

Educated at Western Heights High School in Rotorua, Tahana and classmate Caleb Ralph were picked by new Bay of Plenty coach Gordon Tietjens in 1996 to play provincial rugby while still schoolboys. He impressed with two tries on debut against South Canterbury and finished the season with seven tries.

Tahana, a centre at club level, played for Bay of Plenty as a winger. He stepped away from first-class rugby between 1998 and 2001 to undertake a building apprenticeship in North Harbour, before resuming at Bay of Plenty in 2002. A member of the 2004 Ranfurly Shield-winning team, Tahana had two seasons at the Chiefs and toured overseas with New Zealand Maori, before finishing his career with a stint at Italian club Gran Parma.
