= Troy Nathan =

New Zealand-born rugby union player

- Born: Troy Nathan; 9 October 1983 (age 43) Troy Natown, New Zealand
- Height: 1.84 m (6 ft 1/2 in)
- Weight: 97 kg (15.3 st; 214 lb)
- School: Kelston Boys High School, Auckland, New Zealand

Rugby union career
- Position: 1st 5 / Centre / Goal Kicker
- Current team: Lazio Rugby
Senior career
Years	Team	Apps	(Points)
2002-07	Counties Manukau	49	(446)
2007-11	Connacht	73	(45)
2011-13	Glasgow Warriors	21	(10)
2013-14	Mogliano Rugby	12	(29)
2013-14	Lazio Rugby	35	(236)
2014	→Zebre	1	(2)
2015-17	Rugby Lyons Piacenza	17	(31)
- Correct as of 29 August 2014

Troy Nathan (born 9 October 1983) is a professional New Zealand-born rugby union player. Coming through Kelston Boys High School 1996-2001 representing New Zealand age grade at Rugby, Touch Football and Softball. In 2001 at the age of 17 years, he represented the New Zealand Men's touch rugby team. In 2002 he signed with Counties Manukau Rugby Union, staying until 2007. He then moved to Europe, and had 4 seasons with Connacht Rugby in Ireland, two seasons with Glasgow Warriors, and then, in 2013, made his way to the Italian Rugby Federation, playing the remaining 4 months with Mogliano Rugby, where he was part of the team winning the 2012-2013 Italian National Competition National Championship of Excellence. In 2013 he signed a 2-year deal with Lazio Roma Rugby that would see him there until 2015. In 2014 he also played for Zebre. He is qualified to play for Ireland. Nathan played in the Super 14 & Air New Zealand Cup competition. He has played for New Zealand at youth level. He is a utility back, having played in the number 10, 12 and 13 positions, and a goal-kicking specialist.

During his professional rugby career, Nathan maintained part-time studies with a view to life post-rugby. He completed a diploma in Diet & Nutrition, and then specialised in Child and Adolescent Nutrition. He has also studied for a Sales and Marketing Degree, where he looks to gain a network base and more insight in Part-time Sports Management. Nathan also has a background in the fitness industry as a qualified Personal Trainer with two years experience. He has completed the IRB Level 1 & 2 coaching course, providing resource coaching at clubs and schools across all ages and levels. Nathan is the founder and CEO of HRG. Haka Rugby Global is the world's largest provider of rugby camps. HRG works with clubs and amateur rugby players of all ages and in particular children to help them enhance their rugby careers through rugby training and rugby camps around the world. HRG brings the best of New Zealand grassroots rugby to clubs around the world, while teaching players about Maori heritage and culture.
