= Mike Mavor =

New Zealand rugby union player

Mike Mavor is a New Zealand rugby union player. He was the first North Otago player to play 100 games. After retirement he was pulled back to the North Otago squad due to injuries to the team.
