= Brent Ward =

- Born: 14 May 1979 (age 47) Auckland, New Zealand
- Height: 1.85 m (6 ft 1 in)
- Weight: 85 kg (187 lb)
- School: Auckland Grammar School
- University: AUT University

Rugby union career
- Position(s): Fullback; Wing
Senior career
Years	Team	Apps	(Points)
2008-2009	Racing Metro	52	(42)
Provincial / State sides
Years	Team	Apps	(Points)
2002-2007, 2010-2011	Auckland	70	(643)
Super Rugby
Years	Team	Apps	(Points)
2003-2005	Hurricanes	26	(65)
2006	Blues	10	(10)
2007	Crusaders	4	(11)
2011	Crusaders	5	(5)

Brent Ward (born 14 May 1979) is a New Zealand rugby union player. His usual playing position is fullback, though he can also play on the wing and is a confident goal-kicker. A product of Auckland Grammar School and the Auckland University club, he notably played for Auckland in the National Provincial Championship, making his debut in 2002 against Southland. In 2005 he was the highest individual point-scorer in the NPC, with 137 points, and passed a landmark of 500 points for Auckland.

At Super Rugby level, he made his debut in 2003, playing for the Hurricanes against the Crusaders. He was capped 26 times for the Hurricanes between 2003 and 2005, scoring 13 tries. In 2006 he joined the Blues, for whom he was capped 10 times and scored 2 tries. He joined the Crusaders in 2007, earning another four Super Rugby caps.

His last game in New Zealand during the 2007 season was in the final of the Air New Zealand Cup, when he helped Auckland win its 16th national title. He then joined Racing Métro 92.

In 2011 Ward rejoined the Crusaders for their trip to South Africa following numerous injury concerns in the squad. Ward started from the bench against the Cheetahs and started on the wing against the Chiefs in Napier.
