= Shannon Paku =

- Born: Shannon M. Paku; 23 September 1980 (age 46) Masterton, New Zealand
- Height: 6 ft 0 in (1.83 m)
- Weight: 197 lb (89 kg)
- School: Hato Paora College

Rugby union career
- Position: Utility Back
Senior career
| Years | Team | Apps | (Points) |
| 2008-10 | Montauban | 35 | (25) |
Provincial / State sides
| Years | Team | Apps | (Points) |
| 2000-08 | Wellington | 41 | (60) |
| 2010 | Manawatu | 13 | (5) |
Super Rugby
| Years | Team | Apps | (Points) |
| 2001-2002, 2004-08 | Hurricanes | 50 | (53) |
| 2003 | Blues | 2 | (0) |
International career
| Years | Team | Apps | (Points) |
| 2006 | Maori All Blacks | | |
| 2001 | New Zealand U21 | | |

Shannon Paku (born 23 September 1980) is a former New Zealand rugby union player. He notably played for the Hurricanes in the Super 14 competition, and for the Wellington Lions in the Air New Zealand Cup. Considered a utility back, Paku covered the wing, centre and the fullback positions.

== Career ==
Paku started his career representing Wairarapa Bush and had also played for the Manawatu Under-16s and Secondary School teams.

He played for the Wellington province between 2000 and 2008. In 2003, he was signed to the Blues. He returned to Wellington and to play for the Hurricanes for the 2004 season. Paku joined French club US Montauban for the 2008–2009 season.

Paku was a representative in the New Zealand Māori rugby union team and a member of the 2001 New Zealand Under 21 squad that won the International Under 21 tournament, as well as winning the Churchill Cup in 2006 with the NZ Māori.

Shannon was linked with a move to Leeds Carnegie for the start of the 2010–2011 season after his US Montauban were relegated from the Top 14 league for a punishment due to financial irregularities. This did not happen.

Paku played for the Manawatu Turbos in the 2010 ITM Cup.

== Personal ==
Since retiring in 2011, Paku has become an owner of a milk truck business.
