= Scott Hamilton (rugby union) =

NZ international rugby union player

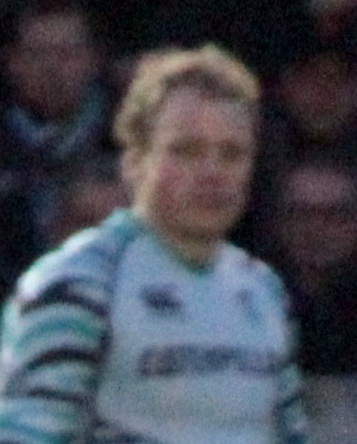
- Born: Scott Elliot Hamilton; 4 March 1980 (age 46) Christchurch, New Zealand
- Height: 1.91 m (6 ft 3 in)
- Weight: 100 kg (15 st 10 lb; 220 lb)
- School: Christchurch Boys' High School

Rugby union career
- Position(s): Wing, Fullback
Senior career
Years	Team	Apps	(Points)
2002—2007	Canterbury		
2003—2008	Crusaders	57	(105)
2008—2014	Leicester Tigers	142	(150)
2015—2016	Coventry	24	(30)
2016—	Hinckley	67	(50)
- Correct as of 14 August 2021
International career
Years	Team	Apps	(Points)
2006	New Zealand	2	(5)
- Correct as of 22 January 2007

Scott Elliot Hamilton (born 4 March 1980) is a New Zealand international rugby union player, who plays both on the wing or at fullback; he played two times for the All Blacks in 2006 and has played for the Crusaders in Super Rugby and Canterbury in the NPC. New Zealand's provincial competition. Hamilton moved to Leicester Tigers in 2008 where he played 142 games in 7 seasons winning three Premiership Rugby titles in 2009, 2010 and 2013.

He was a player-coach at Coventry RFC in National League 1 for the 2015–16 season and since 2016 has been a player and Director of Rugby at National 2 side Hinckley.

== Career ==
Born in Christchurch, New Zealand, unlike many of his peers, Hamilton did not feature in age group teams in his development years. In fact, while at school at Christchurch Boys' High School, Hamilton could not make his first XV, instead playing in the third XV. However, with his skill set, and at the end of the Crusaders and Canterbury backlines, it was considered by most rugby pundits to be a formality that he would eventually go on to higher honours – a point alluded to by his nickname FABSH (Future All Black Scott Hamilton). It was a surprise to many that it took as long as it did for him to be named in the All Black squad for the first time. He was named in the All Blacks squad to play Ireland. All Blacks coach Graham Henry said of Hamilton's All Black selection, "We like the way he anticipates, he's got a good feel for the game in the back three. He reads the play well. He's got a huge work rate and he's deserved of selection".

Due to an injury to All Black wing Sitiveni Sivivatu, Hamilton was promoted from the bench of the 2006 mid-year series against Ireland, to the starting 15 for the Argentina test. This was Hamilton's All Black début, and he celebrated it by scoring a match winning try in the second half.

Hamilton signed a contract with Leicester Tigers in 2008. In his first two seasons he helped Leicester to back to back Premiership titles.

After joining Coventry on loan in February 2015, Hamilton signed permanently for the 2015–16 season. Scott then joined Hinckley RFC at the start of 2016/17 season as a player/coach and played a key role in keeping the side in National 2 North at the first attempt. He rolled back the years in the final game of the season against Harrogate stepping two men and accelerating away to score only his second try of the season. Now in semi- retirement as a player, he is concentrating on his director of Rugby role at Hinckley, however he continues to make cameos off the bench including a match winning try in September 2019 against Luctonians.

He also plays cricket at Kibworth CC.
