= Zar Lawrence =

- Born: Zar Lawrence; 9 February 1982 (age 44) Kaitaia, New Zealand
- Height: 1.92 m (6 ft 4 in)
- Weight: 97 kg (15 st 4 lb)

Rugby union career
- Position: Wing
Provincial / State sides
Years	Team	Apps	(Points)
2008	Bay of Plenty		
2004 – 2006	North Harbour		
International career
Years	Team	Apps	(Points)
2006	Māori All Blacks		
National sevens team
Years	Team		Comps
2005–2010	New Zealand 7s		

Zar Lawrence (b. 9 February 1982. Kaitaia, New Zealand) is a New Zealand Rugby union player who plays for the New Zealand Sevens team internationally, and for Bay of Plenty in the ITM Cup.

== Career highlights ==
- New Zealand Sevens 2005–present
- NZ Maori 2006- 2008
- North Harbour 2004 – 2006
- North Harbour Sevens 2005
- North Harbour Under 21 2003
