= Jimmy Gopperth =

NZ rugby union player (born 1983)

- Born: 29 June 1983 (age 43) New Plymouth, New Zealand
- Height: 179 cm (5 ft 10 in)
- Weight: 90 kg (198 lb; 14 st 2 lb)
- School: New Plymouth Boys' High School

Rugby union career
- Position(s): Fly half, Centre
Senior career
Years	Team	Apps	(Points)
2003–2007	Wellington	45	(447)
2005–2008	Hurricanes	51	(356)
2008	North Harbour	12	(102)
2009	Blues	11	(104)
2009–2013	Newcastle Falcons	113	(1,207)
2013–2015	Leinster	59	(352)
2015–2022	Wasps	156	(1,263)
2022–2023	Leicester Tigers	18	(43)
2023–2025	Provence	52	(295)
2003–2025	Total	513	(4,169)
- Correct as of 27 February 2025
International career
Years	Team	Apps	(Points)
2004	New Zealand U21	1	(10)
2006	Junior All Blacks	2	(47)
2015	Barbarians	1	(7)
- Correct as of 1 June 2020

James Gopperth (born 29 June 1983) is a New Zealand former professional rugby union player. His regular playing positions were centre and fly-half. He played 526 professional games in a 23-year career, one of the highest figures for a player in the professional era, and scored over 4,500 points. He has played professionally for Wellington, North Harbour, the Hurricanes and the Blues in his native New Zealand. He moved to Europe in 2009 where he played for Newcastle Falcons in Premiership Rugby and Leinster in Ireland, before joining Wasps in 2015 where he played 156 games over seven years. He joined Leicester Tigers in 2022 for a single season and spent two seasons with Pro D2 club Provence. He announced his retirement in November 2025.

== Early life ==
Gopperth was born in New Plymouth. He grew up on a farm with a rugby-supportive father.

== Club career ==
=== New Zealand ===
Gopperth first played rugby for New Plymouth Boys' High School, before having his first break in the game and playing for the Old Boys University in the Wellington premier competition. Gopperth joined the Wellington Academy post High School in 2001 and after impressive displays for his club, Gopperth made his first-class debut for Wellington in 2002. Then, in 2003 at the age of 20, Gopperth signed a first-team contract with Wellington Lions.

Gopperth went on to sign for the then Super 12 team Hurricanes in 2005. He made 12 appearances in the 2005 Super 12 season. All of his appearances during that season came from starts and he scored 139 points including three tries.

In the 2005/2006 season, in the newly formed Super 14, he made seven starts during the season and made 15 appearances. He scored 86, with a further two tries and whilst playing 637 minutes.

During the 2006/2007 season Gopperth impressed for his club Wellington, although was unimpressive for his region the Hurricanes. In Super Rugby, Gopperth got 66 points in 13 appearances, still nowhere near his opening season tally, but for Wellington in the Air New Zealand Cup he got 121 points in just 10 games, mostly through the boot.

In his final season for the Hurricanes, Gopperth still could not reach his true form, only scoring 70 points in 12 games with a single try, but in the Air New Zealand Cup he scored an overall haul of 147 points in 12 games.

In 2008, Gopperth joined North Harbour and region Blues. During the 2008/2009 season Gopperth played 11 games and only started nine of them, but still managed to score 101 points with four tries. Then, Gopperth managed to rack up 90 points in 10 games for North Harbour in the Air New Zealand Cup, where he added two tries to his tally.

=== Europe ===
In 2009, only a season after joining the Blues, Gopperth joined Newcastle Falcons on a three-year deal, replacing World Cup winner Jonny Wilkinson. In his first season, Gopperth made 22 appearances, scoring two tries and a total haul of 219 points, making him the league's top scorer. Gopperth, made an appearance for Newcastle Falcons in the Anglo-Welsh Cup, not scoring any points. Gopperth also ended the season as the top points scorer in the Amlin Challenge Cup, scoring 74 points in seven appearances. In the 2010/2011 season, Gopperth again finished top scorer in the Premiership.

In March 2013, Gopperth was linked with a move to Leinster to compete with Ian Madigan for the starting number ten position being vacated by Johnny Sexton's proposed move to Racing Metro in France. On 29 March 2013, Leinster confirmed that Gopperth had signed for the Irish province.

In January 2015, Gopperth signed for Wasps. During the 2016/17 season Gopperth won several awards, including three player of the year awards. He was named the Aviva Premiership player of the year, RPA Players' player of the year and Wasps' player of the year. He also won the golden boot for his 292 points scored during the same season, 102 points more than the next highest scorer, along with being named in the Premiership Dream Team, and winning the Citizen Try of the try Season award for his try against Northampton Saints in round four. At 33 years 333 days, he also became the oldest try scorer in a Premiership final.

It was announced on 2 February 2022 that Gopperth would be leaving Wasps at the end of the season. Although Wasps' head coach, Lee Blackett, stated that month that Gopperth would be joining Leicester Tigers, Tigers did not confirm his signing until three months later, on 12 May. On 5 May 2023 Gopperth was confirmed as leaving Leicester after a single season.

Gopperth played for French D2 rugby side Provence Rugby from 2023 to 2025 in many cases playing 80 min games. His contract was not renewed at the end of the 2025 season.

In November 2025, Gopperth announced his retirement.

== International career ==
Gopperth has never played for his national team, the All Blacks, but has made two appearances for the second string team the Junior All Blacks. His appearances were during the 2006 Pacific Nations Cup, which the Junior All Blacks won both tests, vs Samoa and Tonga. Gopperth scored 26 and 21 points respectively for a total of 47 points in the two games; he scored three tries, with the remainder of his points coming from his kicking.

== Personal life ==
Gopperth is married to Sarah Gopperth.

Due to his approach on and off the field, Jimmy is seen by his peers, fellow players and younger players as a role model.
