= Rugby Park Stadium =

Sports venue in Invercargill, New Zealand

Rugby Park
- Roaring Pen
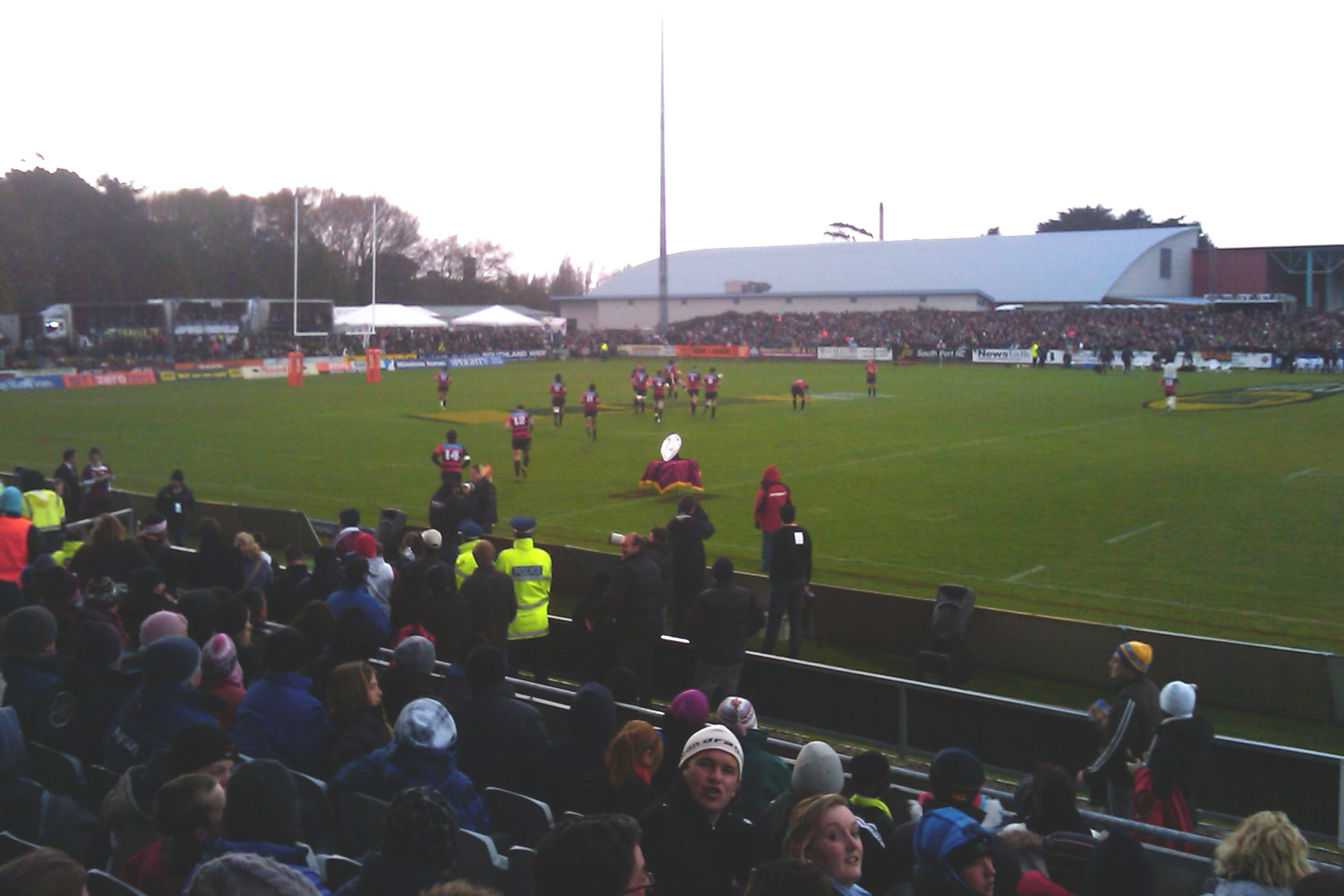
- Interactive map of Rugby Park
- Former names: Homestead Stadium
- Location: Invercargill, New Zealand
- Coordinates: 46°25′1″S 168°21′46″E
- Owner: Invercargill City Council
- Operator: Invercargill Venue & Events Management Ltd managed venue
- Capacity: 18,000
- Surface: Grass
- Field size: 115m x 50m 18 000pax

Construction
- Opened: 1908 (SRFU)

Tenant
- Southland Rugby Football Union

Rugby Park is a sports venue in Invercargill, New Zealand, and the home ground for Southland in the Mitre 10 Cup. Rugby Park is located on the corner of Elles Road and Tweed Street.

The ground has a regular season capacity of 18,000. It has a safe temporary seating maximum capacity of 20,000 (although it can accommodate up to 30,000 with pitch seating, large grass banks and concreted standing terraces). An agreement with the Invercargill City Council saw surplus land on the ground used to build the city's new Swimming Complex. The pitch was moved geographically towards the main stand, squared off to Rugby field dimensions (originally a quasi-cricket ground), with all weather seating installed. The Pitch itself was also weather proofed with a new high volume drainage system installed.

The ground was constructed specifically for rugby, and was opened in April 1908. The main stand was fully rebuilt in 2002 with better player facilities and corporate boxes. Floodlighting towers to full HDMI TV standards were also installed and a purpose build media towner on the terrace side for the Rugby World Cup. Temporary seating was added in 2010 for the 2010 ITM Cup this allowed a crowd of just on 20,000 to attend the first major defence of the Ranfurly Shield against Otago on 7 August, this seating remained in place until the Rugby World Cup games in 2011.

Rugby Park is now owned by the Invercargill City Council and managed by Invercargill Venue & Events Management Ltd, the city council's venue management company.

The Highlanders play occasionally at Rugby Park drawing large crowds. The football (soccer) team Spirit FC also play at Rugby Park. In 2017 the venue attracted large crowds for an internationally renowned event - Nitro Circus. Many local events are held at Rugby Park as well such as Relay For Life.

== World Cup History ==
Rugby Park hosted one minor pool game during the inaugural 1987 Rugby World Cup, Wales verses Canada.

In the 2011 Rugby World Cup, Rugby Park hosted three pool play games (Romania-Scotland, Georgia-Scotland and Argentina-Romania).

== Cricket ground ==
Rugby Park was used as a cricket ground and the headquarters of the Southland Cricket Association for some years. A clay pitch was installed in 1909, the first match was played in 1911, and five first-class cricket matches were played between 1915 and 1921. It holds the distinction of being the world's southernmost first-class cricket ground. The Southland Cricket Association later moved to Queens Park.
