= Josh Levi (rugby union) =

- Born: Joshua Timothy Levi; 14 July 1979 (age 47) Auckland
- Height: 1.82 m (6 ft 0 in)
- Weight: 106 kg (234 lb)
- School: Auckland Grammar School

Rugby union career
- Position: Utility Back
- Current team: Yamaha Júbilo
Senior career
Years	Team	Apps	(Points)
2006-2009	Venezia Mestre		
2009 – present	Yamaha Júbilo		
Provincial / State sides
Years	Team	Apps	(Points)
- Steelers
2003-2007	Northland		

Joshua Timothy "Josh" Levi (born 14 July 1979) is a professional rugby union player from New Zealand.

== Career ==
Levi attended Auckland Grammar School. He first played rugby union for the Marist under 6's Counties Manukau. He also played in the Manurewa Rugby Union under 19 team winning the under 19's championship in 1998. Levi is a utility backline player, he has played halfback, first five-eighths, second five-eighths, centre, fullback and wing.

He played for Counties Manukau, Auckland Blues colts (1998–1999), Waikato Chiefs colts (1999), Highlanders Colts (2000–?), Northland Rugby Union (2003–2007), Venezia Mestre Rugby Union Italy club (2006–2009) and Yamaha Jubilo Japan since 2009 where he tends to play second five-eighths or centre positions. His father is a pastor of a mission church Providence Presbyterian part of the Grace Presbyterian Church of New Zealand denomination.
