= Craig McGrath (rugby union) =

- Born: Craig McGrath; 2 April 1974 (age 52) Auckland, New Zealand
- Height: 6 ft 0 in (1.82 m)
- Weight: 14 st 2 lb (90 kg)

Rugby union career
- Position: Scrum-half
Senior career
Years	Team	Apps	(Points)
2003-2005	Blues	4	(0)
1996-97, 2002-04	Auckland	1	(0)
2006	North Harbour	6	(5)
2006–2008	Viadana	44	(5)
- Correct as of 28 November 2017
International career
Years	Team	Apps	(Points)
1997-98, 2004-05	Māori All Blacks	4	(0)
- Correct as of 28 November 2017
Coaching career
- Years: Team
- 2015–: Melbourne Rebels (assistant)
- 2018–: Honda Heat (assistant)
- Correct as of 28 November 2017

Craig McGrath (born 2 April 1974) is a New Zealand rugby union coach and former player. He is currently an assistant coach with the Melbourne Rebels, and coach of the Melbourne Rising. His professional playing career spanned five seasons, where he played for Blues, as well as Auckland, North Harbour, and Viadana. His usual playing positions was Scrum-half.

He attended High School at Waitākere College.

== Coaching ==
McGrath worked as coach of Waitemata Rugby and Boyne RFC before becoming the coach of Melbourne Harlequins in 2014. He joined the Rebels as assistant coach in 2015, before being appointed coach of Melbourne Rising from the 2018 season.
